= 2021–22 Brighton & Hove Albion F.C. season =

120th season in existence of Brighton & Hove Albion

Brighton & Hove Albion
2021–22 season
- Chairman: Tony Bloom
- Head coach: Graham Potter
- Stadium: Falmer Stadium
- Premier League: 9th
- FA Cup: Fourth round
- EFL Cup: Fourth round
- Top goalscorer: League: Neal Maupay; Leandro Trossard (8 each); All: Neal Maupay (9)
- Highest home attendance: 31,637 vs Manchester United (Premier League – 7 May 2022)
- Lowest home attendance: 8,838 vs Swansea City (EFL Cup – 22 September 2021)
- Average home league attendance: 30,943
- Biggest win: 4–0 vs Manchester United (Premier League - 7 May 2022)
- Biggest defeat: 1–4 vs Manchester City (Premier League – 23 October 2021); 0–3 vs Burnley (Premier League – 19 February 2022); 3–0 vs Manchester City (Premier League – 20 April 2022)
Home colours	Away colours	Third colours

The 2021–22 season was the 120th season in the existence of Brighton & Hove Albion and the club's fifth consecutive season in the top flight of English football. In addition to the domestic league, Brighton & Hove Albion participated in this season's edition of the FA Cup and in the EFL Cup, where they exited both competitions in the fourth round. Brighton finished the season in ninth, their highest ever finish in the top flight, surpassing the 13th-place finish in the 1981–82 season.

== Summary ==
Brighton played three pre-season friendlies, the first coming against Rangers at Ibrox on 24 July where it finished in a goalless draw, with former Albion player Connor Goldson being the main attraction of the fixture. Their second friendly fixture came a week later, away at Luton Town with former Seagulls player and coach Nathan Jones managing The Hatters. Brighton prevailed, winning 3–1 with goals from Aaron Connolly, new summer signing Enock Mwepu and Percy Tau finding the net for the first time in an Albion shirt. Brighton's last pre-season friendly came on 7 August and the only friendly being played at home. With the return of most first team players including the likes of captain Lewis Dunk and Leandro Trossard, Albion fell to a 2–0 defeat to La Liga side Getafe.

Albion won their opening match of the season coming from behind to win 2–1 against Burnley at Turf Moor with goals from Neal Maupay and Alexis Mac Allister. Summer signing Enock Mwepu made his Brighton and Premier League debut with Shane Duffy making his first Albion appearance since the 2019–20 season. Brighton beat Watford 2–0 on 21 August, in the second match of the season with this being their best start in a top-flight campaign. It was also Albion's first match in front of a full stadium since March 2020.

Potter fielded a team of an average age of 20.5 years in the second round EFL Cup tie over Cardiff City with Jakub Moder and Andi Zeqiri grabbing their first Brighton goals in the 2–0 away win.

Brighton's first loss came on 28 August, a 2–0 home loss against Everton with Taylor Richards making his Albion league and Premier League debut. In the first derby game against bitter rivals Crystal Palace of the season away at Selhurst Park on 27 September, Brighton were trailing after Leandro Trossard conceded a penalty in which Wilfried Zaha scored and took Crystal Palace 1–0 up at the break. However, Joël Veltman hit a long ball into Neal Maupay from a poor Vicente Guaita goal kick and Maupay lobbed the keeper and scored a 90+5th-minute equaliser taking a point back to Sussex.

Brighton's second loss of the Premier League season came on 23 October, in their ninth game, losing 4–1 at home with Manchester City winning comfortably, scoring their first three goals in the space of 18 minutes. Four days later, Brighton were knocked of the EFL Cup, losing away to Leicester City on penalties after a 2–2 draw in which Mwepu scored his first goal for the club. Jürgen Locadia also made his first start – and only his second appearance – for the club in over two years. Three days later, away at Liverpool Brighton came from 2–0 down to draw 2–2, with Mwepu again on the scoresheet adding his first league goal for the club.

Potter made his 100th appearance as Brighton manager on 20 November, in the 2–0 away defeat against Aston Villa.

On 6 December, Brighton were drawn away to West Bromwich Albion in the third round FA Cup draw, which will be played on 8 January 2022. Albion's Premier League fixture with Tottenham Hotspur set to be played on 12 December was postponed three days prior to the match with Spurs having high numbers of COVID-19 cases. Brighton returned to action on 15 December, a midweek 1–0 home loss against Wolves, with several absences due to Covid, injury and suspension before the fixture against Manchester United scheduled for 18 December was also postponed, this time two days prior to kick off with Covid cases in both squads.

After a 12-game winless run dating back to 19 September, Brighton were able to hit two against Brentford without reply on Boxing Day and move back into the top half of the table. The result also meant that the Seagulls won the double over The Bees after beating them in the earlier away fixture in September.

Brighton beat West Brom in the third round of the FA Cup on 8 January 2022, with Odel Offiah making his first start for the club in the eventual 2–1 after extra-time away victory. Keeper Kjell Scherpen made his Albion debut in this game.

In the reverse fixture against Palace on 15 January, Pascal Groß had a penalty saved from Eagles keeper Jack Butland to deny Brighton of going 1–0 up. Maupay had a goal disallowed for a high boot on Butland moments later in the eventual 1–1 draw. Brighton got the equaliser through a Joachim Andersen own goal in the 87th minute thanks to a low pacey pass in front of goal from Maupay.

Brighton were knocked out of the FA Cup in the fourth round after losing 3–1 at Tottenham on 5 February after a Harry Kane double and a Solly March own goal, with Yves Bissouma giving Albion hope before Kane scored his second. Brighton's record-breaking unbeaten league run of seven matches was ended on 15 February, in Potter's 100th league game in charge, losing 2–0 away to Manchester United at Old Trafford. Dunk was sent off shortly after United's opener. He was originally shown a yellow card by referee Peter Bankes, however, Bankes went to VAR and deemed Dunk to have denied Anthony Elanga a run on goal

After six straight defeats Brighton ended the run with a somewhat disappointing draw with Norwich City on 2 April, finishing 0–0 at home with a Neal Maupay penalty being stuck over the bar. A week later Brighton ended their run of seven games without a win in style, with a 2–1 away win over Arsenal. Mwepu scored and assisted on his first start since a long period out injured, with Moisés Caicedo making his Premier League debut where he assisted Mwepu's goal. Seven days later Albion were up in North London again, this time enjoying their time at the Tottenham Hotspur Stadium with Trossard scoring a 90th minute – scoring two goals in as many games – as Brighton made it six games unbeaten in the capital. Albion beat Wolves 3–0 at Molineux Stadium on 30 April, taking their points tally to 44 points breaking their record of 41 points in a Premier League season. The win also meant they had won 10 Premier League matches throughout the campaign, beating their previous record of nine.

On 7 May, a brilliant Brighton demolished a dreadful Manchester United 4–0 at the AMEX, with Brighton's biggest ever top flight result being their first home victory of 2022, which was also in front of a record crowd, 31,637. Moisés Caicedo and Marc Cucurella scored their first Albion goals with Pascal Groß scoring his first goal of the campaign and Trossard scoring one and assisting two others as Brighton beat United for the first time in eight games, ending their chances for 2022–23 UEFA Champions League qualification. At Albions' end of season awards, Marc Cucurealla won both Players' Player and Player of the Season in his debut season. Jeremy Sarmiento picked up Brighton's Young Player of the Season with Enock Mwepu winning The Seagulls Goal of the Season with his 20-yard strike against Liverpool in October. Brighton achieved their highest ever top flight finish, finishing in ninth place after beating West Ham 3–1 in the last game of the season, with Joël Veltman scoring his second ever goal for The Seagulls. The victory took their points tally to 51 points, 10 points higher than their previous record, and scoring 42 goals, their most in a Premier League season. This was also the first time since being in the Premier League where Brighton finished ahead of rivals Crystal Palace who finished in 12th.

== Players ==
As of 12 January 2022

Note: Flags indicate national team as defined under FIFA eligibility rules; some limited exceptions apply. Players may hold more than one non-FIFA nationality.

No.	Pos.	Nation	Player
1	GK	ESP	Robert Sánchez
2	DF	ENG	Tariq Lamptey
3	DF	ESP	Marc Cucurella
4	DF	ENG	Adam Webster
5	DF	ENG	Lewis Dunk (captain)
8	MF	MLI	Yves Bissouma
9	FW	FRA	Neal Maupay
10	MF	ARG	Alexis Mac Allister
11	FW	BEL	Leandro Trossard
12	MF	ZAM	Enock Mwepu
13	MF	GER	Pascal Groß
14	MF	ENG	Adam Lallana
15	MF	POL	Jakub Moder
17	MF	COL	Steven Alzate
18	FW	ENG	Danny Welbeck

No.	Pos.	Nation	Player
20	DF	ENG	Solly March
23	GK	ENG	Jason Steele
24	DF	IRL	Shane Duffy
25	MF	ECU	Moisés Caicedo
28	DF	ENG	Haydon Roberts
34	DF	NED	Joël Veltman
38	GK	ENG	Tom McGill
42	MF	SCO	Marc Leonard
53	DF	BEL	Antef Tsoungui
54	DF	IRL	James Furlong
55	DF	WAL	Ed Turns
57	DF	ENG	Odel Offiah
58	FW	IRL	Evan Ferguson
59	MF	IRL	Andrew Moran
60	FW	ECU	Jeremy Sarmiento

== Transfers ==
=== Transfers in ===
Date	Position	Nationality	Name	From	Fee	Team	Ref.
2 July 2021	CM	(Republic of Ireland)	Gary Dicker (Note: Dicker was initially signed as a player-coach for the U23s and academy, before announcing his retirement on 25 January 2022)	(Scotland) Kilmarnock	Free transfer	U23s	
2 July 2021	RW	(Ecuador)	Jeremy Sarmiento	(Portugal) Benfica	Undisclosed	U23s	
6 July 2021	CM	(Zambia)	Enock Mwepu	(Austria) Red Bull Salzburg	Undisclosed	First team	
7 July 2021	MF	(England)	Jake Gee	(England) Fulham	Free transfer	U18s	
7 July 2021	CB	(Northern Ireland)	Ruairi McConville	(Northern Ireland) Linfield	Undisclosed	U18s	
7 July 2021	MF	(England)	Bailey Smith	(England) Worthing	Undisclosed	U18s	
7 July 2021	RB	(England)	Joe Winstanley	(England) Wigan Athletic	Undisclosed	U18s	
16 July 2021	GK	(Netherlands)	Kjell Scherpen	(Netherlands) Ajax	Undisclosed	First team	
10 August 2021	LW	(Japan)	Kaoru Mitoma	(Japan) Kawasaki Frontale	Undisclosed	First team	
14 August 2021	CM	(England)	Jack Hinchy	(England) Stockport County	Undisclosed	U23s	
31 August 2021	LB	(Spain)	Marc Cucurella	(Spain) Getafe	Undisclosed	First team	
31 August 2021	RW	(Senegal)	Abdallah Sima	(Czech Republic) Slavia Prague	Undisclosed	U23s	
5 January 2022	MF	(Poland)	Kacper Kozłowski	(Poland) Pogoń Szczecin	Undisclosed	First team	
31 January 2022	CF	(Germany)	Deniz Undav	(Belgium) Royale Union Saint-Gilloise	Undisclosed	First team	

=== Loans in ===
Date from	Position	Nationality	Name	From	Date until	Team	Ref.
31 January 2022	LW	(England)	Benicio Baker-Boaitey	(Portugal) FC Porto	End of season	U23s	

=== Loans out ===
Date from	Position	Nationality	Name	To	Date until	Team	Ref.
1 July 2021	LB	(England)	Alex Cochrane	(Scotland) Heart of Midlothian	End of season	U23s	
1 July 2021	CM	(England)	Teddy Jenks	(Scotland) Aberdeen	End of season	U23s	
7 July 2021	RW	(England)	Ryan Longman	(England) Hull City	31 January 2022 (Note: On 31 January 2022, Longman's loan move to Hull City was made permanent)	U23s	
13 July 2021	CM	(England)	Jensen Weir	(England) Cambridge United	End of season	U23s	
13 July 2021	CB	(England)	Matt Clarke	(England) West Bromwich Albion	End of season	First team	
14 July 2021	GK	(England)	Carl Rushworth	(England) Walsall	End of season	U23s	
10 August 2021	LW	(Japan)	Kaoru Mitoma	(Belgium) Royale Union Saint-Gilloise	End of season	First team	
10 August 2021	CB	(Norway)	Leo Skiri Østigård	(England) Stoke City	5 January 2022 (Note: On 5 January 2022, Leo Skiri Østigård was recalled from his loan spell at Stoke City)	U23s	
23 August 2021	CF	(Romania)	Florin Andone	(Spain) Cádiz	End of season	First team	
27 August 2021	CM	(Republic of Ireland)	Jayson Molumby	(England) West Bromwich Albion	End of season	First team	
28 August 2021	LB	(Poland)	Michał Karbownik	(Greece) Olympiacos	End of season	First team	
29 August 2021	CB	(Netherlands)	Jan Paul van Hecke	(England) Blackburn Rovers	End of season	U23s	
30 August 2021	GK	(England)	Christian Walton	(England) Ipswich Town	19 January 2022 (Note: On 19 January 2022, Walton's loan at Ipswich was made permanent.)	First team	
30 August 2021	CF	(Switzerland)	Andi Zeqiri	(Germany) Augsburg	End of season	First team	
31 August 2021	CM	(Ecuador)	Moisés Caicedo	(Belgium) Beerschot	12 January 2022 (Note: On 12 January 2022, Moises Caicedo was recalled from his loan spell at Beerschot.)	First team	
31 August 2021	CB	(Belgium)	Lars Dendoncker	(Scotland) St Johnstone	3 January 2022 (Note: On 3 January 2022, Lars Dendoncker was recalled from his loan spell at St Johnstone.)	U23s	
31 August 2021	LW	(Germany)	Reda Khadra	(England) Blackburn Rovers	End of season	U23s	
31 August 2021	RW	(Senegal)	Abdallah Sima	(England) Stoke City	End of season	U23s	
2 January 2022	CF	(Republic of Ireland)	Aaron Connolly	(England) Middlesbrough	End of season	First team	
5 January 2022	MF	(Poland)	Kacper Kozłowski	(Belgium) Royale Union Saint-Gilloise	End of season	First team	
5 January 2022	CB	(Norway)	Leo Skiri Østigård	(Italy) Genoa	End of season	U23s	
7 January 2022	CM	(England)	Taylor Richards	(England) Birmingham City	End of season	U23s	
24 January 2022	GK	(England)	Fynn Talley	(England) Gosport Borough		U23s	
27 January 2022	GK	(England)	Adam Desbois	(England) Leatherhead	End of season	U23s	
31 January 2022	CF	(Switzerland)	Lorent Tolaj	(England) Cambridge United	End of season	U23s	
31 January 2022	CF	(Germany)	Deniz Undav	(Belgium) Royale Union Saint-Gilloise	End of season	First team	
31 January 2022	GK	(Netherlands)	Kjell Scherpen	(Belgium) Oostende	End of season	First team	
14 February 2022	LB	(England)	Sam Packham	(Republic of Ireland) Bohemians	End of season	U23s	

=== Transfers out ===
Date	Position	Nationality	Name	To	Fee	Team	Ref.
23 June 2021	CM	(Netherlands)	Davy Pröpper	(Netherlands) PSV Eindhoven	Undisclosed	First team	
30 June 2021	CF	(England)	Danny Cashman	(England) Coventry City	Released	U23s	
30 June 2021	LW	(Sweden)	Peter Gwargis	(Sweden) Malmö FF	Released	U23s	
30 June 2021	LW	(Colombia)	José Izquierdo	(Belgium) Club Brugge	Released	First team	
30 June 2021	CB	(Lithuania)	Kipras Kazukolovas	(Lithuania) FK Žalgiris	Released	U23s	
30 June 2021	GK	(England)	Roco Rees	(England) Brentford	Released	U23s	
30 June 2021	FW	(Serbia)	Stefan Vukoje	(Romania) SSU Politehnica Timișoara	Released	U23s	
1 July 2021	CM	(Wales)	Marcus Dackers	(England) Salford City	Free transfer	U23s	
1 July 2021	CF	(Slovenia)	Jan Mlakar	(Croatia) Hajduk Split	Undisclosed	U23s	
2 July 2021	LB	(Brazil)	Bernardo	(Austria) Red Bull Salzburg	Undisclosed	First team	
9 July 2021	CF	(Sweden)	Viktor Gyökeres	(England) Coventry City	Undisclosed	U23s	
11 July 2021	RB	(France)	Romaric Yapi	(Netherlands) Vitesse	Undisclosed	U23s	
12 July 2021	GK	(Australia)	Mathew Ryan	(Spain) Real Sociedad	Undisclosed	First team	
16 July 2021	RW	(Iran)	Alireza Jahanbakhsh	(Netherlands) Feyenoord	Undisclosed	First team	
30 July 2021	CB	(England)	Ben White	(England) Arsenal	Undisclosed	First team	
26 August 2021	SS	(South Africa)	Percy Tau	(Egypt) Al Ahly	Undisclosed	First team	
2 September 2021	RW	(England)	Jack Leahy	(Wales) Cardiff City	Free transfer	U23s	
6 January 2022	CF	(Netherlands)	Jürgen Locadia	(Germany) VfL Bochum	Undisclosed	First team	
19 January 2022	GK	(England)	Christian Walton	(England) Ipswich Town	Undisclosed	First team	
25 January 2022	CM	(Republic of Ireland)	Gary Dicker		Retired	U23s	
31 January 2022	RW	(England)	Ryan Longman	(England) Hull City	£700,000	U23s	
31 January 2022	CB	(England)	Dan Burn	(England) Newcastle United	Undisclosed	First team	
1 March 2022	LW	(Ecuador)	Billy Arce	Free agent	Mutual consent	U23s	
4 May 2022	MF	(Republic of Ireland)	Jayson Molumby	West Bromwich Albion	Undisclosed	First team	

== Pre-season friendlies ==
The Seagulls announced friendly matches against Rangers, Luton Town and Getafe as part of their pre-season preparations.

24 July 2021 Friendly	Rangers	0–0	Brighton & Hove Albion	Glasgow, Scotland
17:30 BST		Report		Stadium: Ibrox Stadium; Attendance: 8,000

31 July 2021 Friendly	Luton Town	1–3	Brighton & Hove Albion	Luton
15:00 BST	Cornick 43'	Report	Connolly 9'; Mwepu 35'; Tau 63'	Stadium: Kenilworth Road

7 August 2021 Friendly	Brighton & Hove Albion	0–2	Getafe	Falmer
19:00 BST		Report	Cabaco 22'; Timor 72'	Stadium: Falmer Stadium

== Competitions ==
=== Overview ===
Competition	First match	Last match	Starting round	Final position	Record							
Competition	First match	Last match	Starting round	Final position	Pld	W	D	L	GF	GA	GD	Win %
Premier League	14 August 2021	22 May 2022	Matchday 1	9th	38	12	15	11	42	44	−2	31.58
FA Cup	8 January 2022	5 February 2022	Third round	Fourth round	2	1	0	1	3	4	−1	50.00
EFL Cup	24 August 2021	27 October 2021 (Note: 4–2 penalty shoot-out defeat against Leicester City on 27 October counts as a draw, as the match finished 2–2 in regular play.)	Second round	Fourth round	3	2	1	0	6	2	+4	66.67
Total					43	15	16	12	51	50	+1	34.88

Source: Soccerway

=== Premier League ===
==== League table ====
Pos	Team	Pld	W	D	L	GF	GA	GD	Pts	Qualification or relegation
7	West Ham United	38	16	8	14	60	51	+9	56	Qualification for the Europa Conference League play-off round (Note: Since the winners of the 2021–22 FA Cup and the 2021–22 EFL Cup, Liverpool, qualified for the Champions League, the spot given to the FA Cup winners (Europa League group stage) was passed to the sixth-placed team and the spot given to the League Cup winners (Europa Conference League play-off round) was passed to the seventh-placed team.)
8	Leicester City	38	14	10	14	62	59	+3	52	
9	Brighton & Hove Albion	38	12	15	11	42	44	−2	51	
10	Wolverhampton Wanderers	38	15	6	17	38	43	−5	51	
11	Newcastle United	38	13	10	15	44	62	−18	49	

Source: Premier League
Rules for classification: 1) Points; 2) Goal difference; 3) Goals scored; 4) If the champions, relegated teams or qualified teams for UEFA competitions cannot be determined by rules 1 to 3, rules 4.1 to 4.3 are applied – 4.1) Points gained in head-to-head record between such teams; 4.2) Away goals scored in head-to-head record between such teams; 4.3) Play-offs

==== Results summary ====
Overall								Home						Away					
Pld	W	D	L	GF	GA	GD	Pts	W	D	L	GF	GA	GD	W	D	L	GF	GA	GD
38	12	15	11	42	44	−2	51	5	7	7	19	23	−4	7	8	4	23	21	+2

Source: Premier League

==== Results by matchday ====
Matchday	1	2	3	4	5	6	7	8	9	10	11	12	13	14	15	16	17	18	19	20	21	22	23	24	25	26	27	28	29	30	31	32	33	34	35	36	37	38
Ground	A	H	H	A	H	A	H	A	H	A	H	A	H	A	A	H	H	A	H	A	A	H	A	H (Note: Match 24 was played before match 23 as a result of Chelsea's involvement in the delayed 2021 FIFA Club World Cup.)	A	H	H	A	H	A	H	A	A	H	A	H	A	H
Result	W	W	L	W	W	D	D	D	L	D	D	L	D	D	D	L	L	L	W	D	W	D	D	D	W	L	L	L	L	L	D	W	W	D	W	W	D	W
Position	8	4	8	6	4	6	6	4	5	8	7	9	9	9	9	11	13	13	9	10	9	9	9	9	9	9	10	13	13	13	13	11	10	11	9	9	10	9

Source: Premier League
A = Away; H = Home; W = Win; D = Draw; L = Loss; P = Postponed

==== Matches ====
The league fixtures were announced on 16 June 2021.

14 August 2021 1	Burnley	1–2	Brighton & Hove Albion	Burnley
15:00 BST	Tarkowski 2', (yellow card) 13'; Guðmundsson (yellow card) 9'	Report	Maupay (yellow card) 26', (goal) 73'; Mac Allister 78'	Stadium: Turf Moor; Attendance: 16,910; Referee: David Coote

21 August 2021 2	Brighton & Hove Albion	2–0	Watford	Falmer
17:30 BST	Duffy 10', (yellow card) 65'; Maupay 41'; Webster (yellow card) 62'; Mwepu (yellow card) 86'; March (yellow card) 90+1'	Report		Stadium: Falmer Stadium; Attendance: 29,485; Referee: Anthony Taylor

28 August 2021 3	Brighton & Hove Albion	0–2	Everton	Falmer
15:00 BST	Bissouma (yellow card) 61'	Report	Gray 41'; Calvert-Lewin 58' (pen.); Richarlison (yellow card) 62'; Pickford (yellow card) 83'	Stadium: Falmer Stadium; Attendance: 30,548; Referee: Jonathan Moss

11 September 2021 4	Brentford	0–1	Brighton & Hove Albion	Brentford
15:00 BST	Canós (yellow card) 6'; Mbeumo (yellow card) 17'; Ajer (yellow card) 74'	Report	Veltman (yellow card) 55'; Duffy (yellow card) 57'; Trossard 90'	Stadium: Brentford Community Stadium; Attendance: 16,518; Referee: Graham Scott

19 September 2021 5	Brighton & Hove Albion	2–1	Leicester City	Falmer
14:00 BST	Veltman (yellow card) 20'; Maupay 35' (pen.); Welbeck 50'; Sánchez (yellow card) 90+4'	Report	Ndidi (yellow card) 44'; Vardy 62'	Stadium: Falmer Stadium; Attendance: 31,078; Referee: Stuart Attwell

27 September 2021 6	Crystal Palace	1–1	Brighton & Hove Albion	Selhurst
20:00 BST	Zaha 45+2' (pen.); Gallagher (yellow card) 84'; McArthur (yellow card) 90+7'	Report	Lallana (yellow card) 28'; Cucurella (yellow card) 77'; Trossard (yellow card) 81'; Maupay 90+5'; Sánchez (yellow card) 90+7'	Stadium: Selhurst Park; Attendance: 22,975; Referee: Andre Marriner

2 October 2021 7	Brighton & Hove Albion	0–0	Arsenal	Falmer
17:30 BST	Maupay (yellow card) 74'; Veltman (yellow card) 82'	Report	Partey (yellow card) 90+1'	Stadium: Falmer Stadium; Attendance: 31,266; Referee: Jonathan Moss

16 October 2021 8	Norwich City	0–0	Brighton & Hove Albion	Norwich
15:00 BST	Kabak (yellow card) 30'; Giannoulis (yellow card) 50'; Pukki (yellow card) 75'	Report	Veltman (yellow card) 15'; Lallana (yellow card) 24'; Cucurella (yellow card) 41'; Duffy (yellow card) 90+2'; Burn (yellow card) 90+4'	Stadium: Carrow Road; Attendance: 26,777; Referee: Peter Bankes

23 October 2021 9	Brighton & Hove Albion	1–4	Manchester City	Falmer
17:30 BST	Moder (yellow card) 63'; Lallana (yellow card) 70'; Mac Allister 81' (pen.)	Report	Gündoğan 13'; Walker (yellow card) 22'; Foden 28', 31'; Cancelo (yellow card) 60'; Ederson (yellow card) 84'; Mahrez 90+5'	Stadium: Falmer Stadium; Attendance: 31,215; Referee: Kevin Friend

30 October 2021 10	Liverpool	2–2	Brighton & Hove Albion	Liverpool
15:00 BST	Henderson 4'; Mané 24'; Minamino (yellow card) 88'; Robertson (yellow card) 90+4'	Report	Mwepu 41'; Trossard 65'; Lamptey (yellow card) 90'; Duffy (yellow card) 90+2'	Stadium: Anfield; Attendance: 53,197; Referee: Mike Dean

6 November 2021 11	Brighton & Hove Albion	1–1	Newcastle United	Falmer
17:30 GMT	Trossard 24' (pen.); Lallana (yellow card) 74'; Bissouma (yellow card) 84'; Maupay (yellow card) 84'; Sánchez (red card) 90+2'	Report	Lascelles (yellow card) 12'; Murphy (yellow card) 61'; Hayden 66'; Shelvey (yellow card) 69'; Wilson (yellow card) 73'	Stadium: Falmer Stadium; Attendance: 31,267; Referee: David Coote

20 November 2021 12	Aston Villa	2–0	Brighton & Hove Albion	Aston
15:00 GMT	Nakamba (yellow card) 59'; Watkins 84'; Mings 89'; Konsa (yellow card) 90+3'; Cash (yellow card) 90+4'	Report	Cucurella (yellow card) 49'; Webster (yellow card) 67'; Mac Allister (yellow card) 90+3'	Stadium: Villa Park; Attendance: 41,925; Referee: Anthony Taylor

27 November 2021 13	Brighton & Hove Albion	0–0	Leeds United	Falmer
17:30 GMT	Bissouma (yellow card) 81'	Report	Firpo (yellow card) 5'; Llorente (yellow card) 66'; Shackleton (yellow card) 85'	Stadium: Falmer Stadium; Attendance: 31,166; Referee: Craig Pawson

1 December 2021 14	West Ham United	1–1	Brighton & Hove Albion	Stratford
19:30 GMT	Souček 5'; Antonio (yellow card) 90+6'	Report	Maupay 89', (yellow card) 90'	Stadium: London Stadium; Attendance: 59,626; Referee: Chris Kavanagh

4 December 2021 15	Southampton	1–1	Brighton & Hove Albion	Southampton
15:00 GMT	Broja 29'; Tella (yellow card) 69'; Salisu (yellow card) 80'; Elyounoussi (yellow card) 90+4'; Romeu (yellow card) 90+7'	Report	Duffy (yellow card) 45'; Bissouma (yellow card) 74'; Maupay 90+8'	Stadium: St Mary's Stadium; Attendance: 28,706; Referee: Anthony Taylor

15 December 2021 17	Brighton & Hove Albion	0–1	Wolverhampton Wanderers	Falmer
19:30 GMT	Bissouma (yellow card) 69'; Burn (yellow card) 90+1'	Report	Saïss 45+1'	Stadium: Falmer Stadium; Attendance: 30,362; Referee: Tony Harrington

26 December 2021 19	Brighton & Hove Albion	2–0	Brentford	Falmer
20:00 GMT	Trossard 34'; Maupay 42'; Webster (yellow card) 59'	Report	Sørensen (yellow card) 38'; Nørgaard (yellow card) 45'; Toney (yellow card) 77'	Stadium: Falmer Stadium; Attendance: 30,141; Referee: Darren England

29 December 2021 20	Chelsea	1–1	Brighton & Hove Albion	Fulham
19:30 GMT	Lukaku 28'; Rüdiger (yellow card) 41'; Kovačić (yellow card) 58'; Hudson-Odoi (yellow card) 64'; Mount (yellow card) 81'	Report	Bissouma (yellow card) 81'; Welbeck 90+1'	Stadium: Stamford Bridge; Attendance: 40,080; Referee: Mike Dean

2 January 2022 21	Everton	2–3	Brighton & Hove Albion	Walton
14:00 GMT	Kenny (yellow card) 9'; Calvert-Lewin (penalty missed) 25'; Gordon 53', 76'	Report	Mac Allister 3', 71'; Burn 21'; Webster (yellow card) 63'	Stadium: Goodison Park; Attendance: 38,203; Referee: John Brooks

14 January 2022 22	Brighton & Hove Albion	1–1	Crystal Palace	Falmer
20:00 GMT	Groß (penalty missed) 38'; Andersen 87' (o.g.)	Report	Eze (yellow card) 44'; Hughes (yellow card) 61'; Gallagher 69'	Stadium: Falmer Stadium; Attendance: 30,675; Referee: Robert Jones

18 January 2022 24	Brighton & Hove Albion	1–1	Chelsea	Falmer
20:00 GMT	Webster 60'; Burn (yellow card) 80'	Report	Ziyech 28'; Alonso (yellow card) 59'; Rüdiger (yellow card) 81'	Stadium: Falmer Stadium; Attendance: 30,880; Referee: Kevin Friend
Note: Match originally scheduled for 8 February 2022 but was rearranged due to Chelsea's involvement in the 2021 Club World Cup.

23 January 2022 23	Leicester City	1–1	Brighton & Hove Albion	Leicester
14:00 GMT	Daka 46'	Report	Burn (yellow card) 67'; Welbeck 82'	Stadium: King Power Stadium; Attendance: 31,231; Referee: Martin Atkinson

12 February 2022 25	Watford	0–2	Brighton & Hove Albion	Watford
15:00 GMT	Dennis (yellow card) 56'; Kamara (yellow card) 65'; Louza (yellow card) 90+2'	Report	Dunk (yellow card) 25'; Maupay 44'; Lamptey (yellow card) 75'; Webster 82'	Stadium: Vicarage Road; Attendance: 20,795; Referee: Jonathan Moss

15 February 2022 18	Manchester United	2–0	Brighton & Hove Albion	Manchester
20:15 GMT	Ronaldo 51'; Fernandes (yellow card) 53', (goal) 90+7'; Shaw (yellow card) 72'; McTominay (yellow card) 90+5'	Report	Dunk (red card) 54'; Mac Allister (yellow card) 85'	Stadium: Old Trafford; Attendance: 73,012; Referee: Peter Bankes
Note: The match was originally scheduled for 18 December 2021 but was postponed due to a high number of COVID-19 cases at Manchester United.

19 February 2022 26	Brighton & Hove Albion	0–3	Burnley	Falmer
15:00 GMT	Duffy (yellow card) 84'	Report	Weghorst 21'; Cork (yellow card) 25'; Brownhill 40', (yellow card) 87'; Roberts (yellow card) 59'; Lennon (yellow card) 61', (goal) 69'	Stadium: Falmer Stadium; Attendance: 29,921; Referee: Kevin Friend

26 February 2022 27	Brighton & Hove Albion	0–2	Aston Villa	Falmer
15:00 GMT	Cucurella (yellow card) 16'; Trossard (yellow card) 25'; Bissouma (yellow card) 57'; Veltman (yellow card) 58'	Report	Cash 17', (yellow card) 19'; Douglas Luiz (yellow card) 25'; Mings (yellow card) 40'; Watkins (yellow card) 40', (goal) 68'; Martínez (yellow card) 83'	Stadium: Falmer Stadium; Attendance: 31,475; Referee: John Brooks
Note: Kick-off was delayed by half an hour due to Villa's later arrival

5 March 2022 28	Newcastle United	2–1	Brighton & Hove Albion	Newcastle upon Tyne
15:00 GMT	Fraser 12'; Schär 14'; Joelinton (yellow card) 87'	Report	Dunk 55'; Duffy (yellow card) 63'	Stadium: St James' Park; Attendance: 52,214; Referee: Martin Atkinson

12 March 2022 29	Brighton & Hove Albion	0–2	Liverpool	Falmer
12:30 GMT	Bissouma (yellow card) 55'; Mac Allister (yellow card) 75'; Maupay (yellow card) 81'	Report	Díaz 19'; Salah 61' (pen.); Fabinho (yellow card) 84'	Stadium: Falmer Stadium; Attendance: 31,474; Referee: Mike Dean

16 March 2022 16	Brighton & Hove Albion	0–2	Tottenham Hotspur	Falmer
19:30 GMT	Maupay (yellow card) 7'; Veltman (yellow card) 45+1'	Report	Romero 37', (yellow card) 54'; Reguilón (yellow card) 43'; Kane 57'	Stadium: Falmer Stadium; Attendance: 31,144; Referee: Robert Jones
Note: This fixture was originally scheduled for 12 December 2021 but was postponed due to a high number of COVID-19 cases at Tottenham.

2 April 2022 31	Brighton & Hove Albion	0–0	Norwich City	Falmer
15:00 BST	Maupay (penalty missed) 29'; Lamptey (yellow card) 68'	Report	McLean (yellow card) 82'	Stadium: Falmer Stadium; Attendance: 31,245; Referee: Simon Hooper

9 April 2022 32	Arsenal	1–2	Brighton & Hove Albion	Holloway
15:00 BST	Ødegaard (yellow card) 39', (goal) 89'; Saka (yellow card) 50'; Sambi Lokonga (yellow card) 82'	Report	Trossard 28'; Bissouma (yellow card) 35'; Groß (yellow card) 40'; Caicedo (yellow card) 52'; Mwepu 66'; Sánchez (yellow card) 90+1'	Stadium: Emirates Stadium; Attendance: 60,112; Referee: David Coote

16 April 2022 33	Tottenham Hotspur	0–1	Brighton & Hove Albion	Tottenham
12:30 BST	Kulusevski (yellow card) 27'; Bentancur (yellow card) 34'; Emerson (yellow card) 90+4'	Report	Mwepu (yellow card) 26'; Bissouma (yellow card) 58'; Trossard 90'; Dunk (yellow card) 90+5'	Stadium: Tottenham Hotspur Stadium; Attendance: 58,685; Referee: Craig Pawson

20 April 2022 30	Manchester City	3–0	Brighton & Hove Albion	Manchester
20:00 BST	Mahrez 53'; Foden 65'; Silva 82'	Report	Mac Allister (yellow card) 79'; Webster (yellow card) 81'; Dunk (yellow card) 89'	Stadium: Etihad Stadium; Attendance: 52,226; Referee: Mike Dean
Note: The match was originally scheduled for 19 March 2022 but was rearranged due to Manchester City's involvement in the FA Cup quarter-final.

24 April 2022 34	Brighton & Hove Albion	2–2	Southampton	Falmer
14:00 BST	Welbeck 2'; Salisu 44' (o.g.); Cucurella (yellow card) 45+3'	Report	Ward-Prowse 45+4', 54'	Stadium: Falmer Stadium; Attendance: 31,335; Referee: Robert Jones

30 April 2022 35	Wolverhampton Wanderers	0–3	Brighton & Hove Albion	Wolverhampton
15:00 BST	Coady (yellow card) 21'; Hwang (yellow card) 72'	Report	Mac Allister 42' (pen.); Cucurella (yellow card) 60'; Trossard 70'; Bissouma 86'	Stadium: Molineux; Attendance: 31,243; Referee: Simon Hooper

7 May 2022 36	Brighton & Hove Albion	4–0	Manchester United	Falmer
17:30 BST	Caicedo 15'; Cucurella 49'; Groß 57'; Trossard 60'	Report	Ronaldo (yellow card) 45'; Dalot (yellow card) 47'	Stadium: Falmer Stadium; Attendance: 31,637; Referee: Andrew Madley

15 May 2022 37	Leeds United	1–1	Brighton & Hove Albion	Beeston
14:00 BST	Firpo (yellow card) 71'; Rodrigo (yellow card) 81'; Cooper (yellow card) 84'; Struijk 90+2'	Report	Welbeck 21'; Caicedo (yellow card) 65'; Lamptey (yellow card) 90+2'	Stadium: Elland Road; Attendance: 36,638; Referee: Mike Dean

22 May 2022 38	Brighton & Hove Albion	3–1	West Ham United	Falmer
16:00 BST	Veltman 50'; Groß 80'; Maupay (yellow card) 83'; Welbeck 90+2'	Report	Antonio 40'; Souček (yellow card) 42'	Stadium: Falmer Stadium; Attendance: 31,604; Referee: Kevin Friend

=== FA Cup ===
Brighton were drawn away to West Bromwich Albion of the Championship on 6 December for the third round tie, which took place on 8 January 2022. The fourth round draw was held on 9 January, a day after Brighton's third round fixture in which they were drawn an away fixture against fellow Premier League side Tottenham Hotspur.

8 January 2022 Third round	West Bromwich Albion	1–2 (a.e.t.)	Brighton & Hove Albion	West Bromwich
15:00 GMT	Livermore (yellow card) 40'; Robinson 47'; Kipré (yellow card) 67' (yellow-red card) 69'; Townsend (yellow card) 96'; Reach (yellow card) 102'	Report	Moder 81'; Maupay 98'	Stadium: The Hawthorns; Attendance: 8,208; Referee: Robert Jones

5 February 2022 Fourth round	Tottenham Hotspur	3–1	Brighton & Hove Albion	Tottenham
20:00 GMT	Kane 13', 66'; March 24' (o.g.); Bentancur (yellow card) 86'	Report	Veltman (yellow card) 57'; Bissouma 63'	Stadium: Tottenham Hotspur Stadium; Attendance: 54,697; Referee: Stuart Attwell

=== EFL Cup ===
Albion entered the competition in the second round stage and were drawn away to Cardiff City for the second round. In the third round draw Brighton were again to meet Welsh opposition again in Swansea City, this time at home. Brighton were drawn to an away fixture at Leicester City for 27 October, in their fourth round tie.

24 August 2021 Second round	Cardiff City	0–2	Brighton & Hove Albion	Leckwith
19:45 BST	Vaulks (yellow card) 56'; Wintle (yellow card) 73'; Nelson (yellow card) 78'	Report	Moder 9'; Zeqiri 55'	Stadium: Cardiff City Stadium; Attendance: 6,013; Referee: James Bell

22 September 2021 Third round	Brighton & Hove Albion	2–0	Swansea City	Falmer
19:30 BST	Connolly 33', 38'	Report	Williams (yellow card) 45'; Downes (yellow card) 73'; Cooper (yellow card) 90+1'	Stadium: Falmer Stadium; Attendance: 8,838; Referee: Michael Salisbury

27 October 2021 Fourth round	Leicester City	2–2 (4–2 p)	Brighton & Hove Albion	Leicester
19:45 BST	Barnes 6'; Lookman 45+5'; Mendy (yellow card) 77'; Iheanacho (yellow card) 89'	Report	Webster 45+3'; Mwepu 71'	Stadium: King Power Stadium; Attendance: 21,163; Referee: Jarred Gillett
	Penalties
	Maddison (penalty scored); Barnes (penalty scored); Daka (penalty scored); Pereira (penalty scored)		(penalty scored) Groß; (penalty missed) Maupay; (penalty scored) Mac Allister; (penalty missed) Mwepu

== Squad statistics ==
No.	Pos	Nat	Player	Total		Premier League		FA Cup		EFL Cup	
No.	Pos	Nat	Player	Apps	Goals	Apps	Goals	Apps	Goals	Apps	Goals
Goalkeepers
1	GK	(Spain) ESP	Robert Sánchez	38	0	37	0	1	0	0	0
23	GK	(England) ENG	Jason Steele	4	0	1	0	0	0	3	0
38	GK	(England) ENG	Tom McGill	0	0	0	0	0	0	0	0
Defenders
2	DF	(England) ENG	Tariq Lamptey	32	0	16+14	0	1	0	1	0
3	DF	(Spain) ESP	Marc Cucurella	38	1	35	1	0+1	0	1+1	0
4	DF	(England) ENG	Adam Webster	24	3	16+6	2	1	0	1	1
5	DF	(England) ENG	Lewis Dunk	31	1	29	1	1	0	0+1	0
20	DF	(England) ENG	Solly March	33	0	17+14	0	2	0	0	0
24	DF	(Republic of Ireland) IRL	Shane Duffy	20	1	15+3	1	1	0	1	0
28	DF	(England) ENG	Haydon Roberts	3	0	0	0	0	0	3	0
34	DF	(Netherlands) NED	Joël Veltman	37	1	33+1	1	1+1	0	1	0
53	DF	(Belgium) BEL	Antef Tsoungui	1	0	0	0	0	0	1	0
54	DF	(Republic of Ireland) IRL	James Furlong	0	0	0	0	0	0	0	0
55	DF	(Wales) WAL	Ed Turns	1	0	0	0	0	0	1	0
57	DF	(England) ENG	Odel Offiah	2	0	0	0	1	0	0+1	0
Midfielders
8	MF	(Mali) MLI	Yves Bissouma	28	2	25+1	1	1	1	0+1	0
10	MF	(Argentina) ARG	Alexis Mac Allister	36	5	22+11	5	0+1	0	2	0
12	MF	(Zambia) ZAM	Enock Mwepu	21	3	12+6	2	1	0	1+1	1
13	MF	(Germany) GER	Pascal Groß	33	2	24+5	2	2	0	1+1	0
14	MF	(England) ENG	Adam Lallana	25	0	18+6	0	1	0	0	0
15	MF	(Poland) POL	Jakub Moder	32	2	20+8	0	1+1	1	2	1
17	MF	(Colombia) COL	Steven Alzate	12	0	4+5	0	1	0	2	0
25	MF	(Ecuador) ECU	Moisés Caicedo (Note: On 12 January 2022, Moises Caicedo was recalled from his loan spell at Beerschot.)	10	1	8	1	1	0	1	0
42	MF	(Scotland) SCO	Marc Leonard	2	0	0	0	0	0	2	0
59	MF	(Republic of Ireland) IRL	Andrew Moran	1	0	0	0	0	0	0+1	0
Forwards
9	FW	(France) FRA	Neal Maupay	35	9	25+7	8	2	1	0+1	0
11	FW	(Belgium) BEL	Leandro Trossard	35	8	32+2	8	0+1	0	0	0
18	FW	(England) ENG	Danny Welbeck	27	6	16+9	6	1+1	0	0	0
58	FW	(Republic of Ireland) IRL	Evan Ferguson	4	0	0+1	0	0+2	0	0+1	0
60	FW	(Ecuador) ECU	Jeremy Sarmiento	7	0	1+4	0	0	0	1+1	0
Players who left the club permanently or on loan during the season
6	DF	(Poland) POL	Michał Karbownik	1	0	0	0	0	0	1	0
7	FW	(Republic of Ireland) IRL	Aaron Connolly	6	2	1+3	0	0	0	2	2
16	GK	(Netherlands) NED	Kjell Scherpen	1	0	0	0	1	0	0	0
19	FW	(Switzerland) SUI	Andi Zeqiri	1	1	0	0	0	0	1	1
21	FW	(Romania) ROU	Florin Andone	0	0	0	0	0	0	0	0
22	FW	(South Africa) RSA	Percy Tau	0	0	0	0	0	0	0	0
25	MF	(Ecuador) ECU	Moisés Caicedo (Note: On 12 January 2022, Moises Caicedo was recalled from his loan spell at Beerschot.)	1	0	0	0	0	0	1	0
27	FW	(Netherlands) NED	Jürgen Locadia	3	0	0+1	0	0	0	1+1	0
30	MF	(England) ENG	Taylor Richards	4	0	0+2	0	0	0	2	0
31	GK	(England) ENG	Christian Walton (Note: On 19 January 2022, Walton's loan at Ipswich was made permanent.)	0	0	0	0	0	0	0	0
33	DF	(England) ENG	Dan Burn	16	1	12+1	1	1	0	2	0

Note

• Florin Andone joined La Liga side Cádiz on 23 August on a season-long loan.

• Percy Tau joined Egyptian side Al Ahly on 26 August on a permanent deal.

• Michał Karbownik joined Greek side Olympiacos on 27 August on a season-long loan deal.

• Christian Walton signed on a season-long deal with Ipswich Town on 30 August. On 19 January 2022, Walton signed a permanent deal with The Tractor Boys.

• Andi Zeqiri moved to Bundesliga side FC Augsburg on 30 August where he will spend the season on loan at the club.

• Moises Caicedo joined Belgian side Beerschot on a season-long loan deal on 31 August. However, he was recalled to Brighton from his loan on 12 January 2022. His appearances in table are his overall total in current player section and total before he went out on loan in players who left the club section.

• Aaron Connolly joined EFL Championship side Middlesbrough on loan for the remainder of the season on 2 January 2022.

• Jürgen Locadia joined Bundesliga club VfL Bochum on a permanent deal on 5 January 2022.

• Taylor Richards signed for Birmingham City on 8 January 2022 on a loan until the end of the season.

• Dan Burn signed for fellow Premier League side Newcastle United on a permanent deal on 31 January 2022.

• Kjell Scherpen joined Belgian side Oostende on loan for the remainder of the season on 31 January 2022.

== End of season awards ==
- Player of the Season – Marc Cucurella
- Players' Player of the Season – Marc Cucurella
- Young Player of the Season – Jeremy Sarmiento
- Goal of the season – Enock Mwepu v Liverpool - Premier League, 30 October 2021

== See also ==
- 2021–22 in English football
- List of Brighton & Hove Albion F.C. seasons
