= 2018–19 Professional U23 Development League =

The 2018–19 Professional U23 Development League was the seventh season of the Professional Development League system.

== Premier League 2 ==
Premier League 2
- Season: 2018–19
- Champions: Division 1 Everton U23s (2nd Title); Division 2 Wolverhampton Wanderers U23s (1st Title)
- Promoted: Wolverhampton Wanderers U23s; Southampton U23s
- Relegated: West Ham United U23s; Swansea City U23s
- Matches: 267 (264 RS, 3 PO)
- Goals: 839 (3.14 per match) (830 RS, 9 PO)
- Best player: (Republic of Ireland) Aaron Connolly Brighton & Hove Albion U23s
- Top goalscorer: Overall (Republic of Ireland) Adam Idah Norwich City U23s (12 Goals); Division 1 (Republic of Ireland) Aaron Connolly Brighton & Hove Albion U23s (11 Goals); Division 2 (Republic of Ireland) Adam Idah Norwich City U23s (12 Goals)
- Biggest home win: Wolverhampton Wanderers U23s 7–0 Sunderland U23s (24 September 2018)
- Biggest away win: Leicester City U23s 0–6 Liverpool U23s (14 April 2019)
- Highest scoring: Manchester City U23s 6–5 Arsenal U23s (11 August 2018)
- Longest winning run: 4 Matches Arsenal U23s
- Longest unbeaten run: 9 Matches Arsenal U23s
- Longest winless run: 11 matches Sunderland U23s
- Longest losing run: 7 Matches Sunderland U23s
- Highest attendance: 4,362 Liverpool U23s 0–2 Everton U23s (4 March 2019)
- Lowest attendance: 19 West Bromwich Albion U23s 2–0 Reading U23s (27 August 2018); West Bromwich Albion U23s 0–4 Norwich City U23s (8 December 2018)

=== Division 1 ===
==== Table ====
Pos	Team	Pld	W	D	L	GF	GA	GD	Pts
1	Everton U23s (C)	22	12	5	5	31	14	+17	41
2	Arsenal U23s	22	10	7	5	48	36	+12	37
3	Brighton & Hove Albion U23s	22	9	8	5	37	27	+10	35
4	Liverpool U23s	22	9	7	6	38	27	+11	34
5	Blackburn Rovers U23s	22	9	4	9	38	37	+1	31
6	Chelsea U23s	22	9	4	9	34	33	+1	31
7	Derby County U23s	22	9	3	10	29	34	−5	30
8	Manchester City U23s	22	9	3	10	38	48	−10	30
9	Tottenham Hotspur U23s	22	7	7	8	26	38	−12	28
10	Leicester City U23s	22	8	3	11	24	33	−9	27
11	West Ham United U23s (R)	22	8	2	12	41	43	−2	26
12	Swansea City U23s (R)	22	3	7	12	28	42	−14	16

Updated to match(es) played on 3 May 2019. Source:
(C) Champions; (R) Relegated

==== Results ====
Home \ Away	ARS	BLA	B&H	CHE	DER	EVE	LEI	LIV	MNC	SWA	TOT	WHU
Arsenal U23s		0–4	1–1	4–5	5–0	0–0	3–0	4–0	5–1	2–2	2–1	1–0
Blackburn Rovers U23s	0–0		2–2	0–3	1–3	0–3	7–1	2–1	3–1	3–1	1–3	1–3
Brighton & Hove Albion U23s	2–2	2–1		1–2	2–1	1–2	0–1	0–0	5–0	2–2	2–0	2–1
Chelsea U23s	1–3	0–1	2–3		0–1	1–1	1–1	1–3	2–0	0–2	1–1	3–2
Derby County U23s	5–0	2–2	1–0	0–1		1–0	0–2	1–3	0–1	1–5	1–0	2–2
Everton U23s	0–0	2–0	1–0	2–0	1–0		1–0	0–1	1–0	0–0	6–0	2–1
Leicester City U23s	1–2	4–1	2–2	2–1	0–1	1–0		0–6	0–0	1–0	1–2	3–0
Liverpool U23s	4–1	1–2	1–1	3–2	2–3	0–2	3–1		1–1	3–0	1–1	1–2
Manchester City U23s	6–5	3–0	0–1	1–4	3–2	4–3	1–0	1–1		3–1	1–2	1–5
Swansea City U23s	1–1	1–1	2–3	0–1	1–1	0–1	0–3	1–1	1–4		1–2	0–3
Tottenham Hotspur U23s	0–4	0–3	1–1	1–1	3–1	2–2	1–0	1–1	2–0	1–4		1–3
West Ham United U23s	2–3	1–3	2–4	1–2	0–2	2–1	1–0	0–1	4–6	5–3	1–1	

Source: Premier League 2 Division 1 results
Legend: Blue = home team win; Yellow = draw; Red = away team win.

=== Division 2 ===
==== Table ====
Pos	Team	Pld	W	D	L	GF	GA	GD	Pts
1	Wolverhampton Wanderers U23s (P)	22	13	4	5	45	22	+23	43
2	Southampton U23s (P)	22	13	4	5	37	21	+16	43
3	Reading U23s	22	12	4	6	45	33	+12	40
4	Newcastle United U23s	22	13	1	8	46	37	+9	40
5	Aston Villa U23s	22	11	4	7	35	30	+5	37
6	Manchester United U23s	22	8	6	8	33	31	+2	30
7	Stoke City U23s	22	7	7	8	42	37	+5	28
8	Middlesbrough U23s	22	6	8	8	32	36	−4	26
9	West Bromwich Albion U23s	22	5	9	8	33	38	−5	24
10	Fulham U23s	22	5	7	10	26	34	−8	22
11	Norwich City U23s	22	5	4	13	30	52	−22	19
12	Sunderland U23s	22	2	6	14	14	47	−33	12

Updated to match(es) played on 13 May 2019. Source:
(P) Promoted

==== Results ====
Home \ Away	AST	FUL	MNU	MID	NEW	NOR	REA	SOT	STK	SUN	WBA	WOL
Aston Villa U23s		2–1	5–1	1–1	2–5	2–0	4–5	2–1	0–3	1–0	0–0	1–0
Fulham U23s	0–1		2–2	2–2	0–1	1–0	0–3	1–1	1–1	2–0	0–3	1–0
Manchester United U23s	3–1	1–3		2–0	1–4	1–2	1–1	0–1	1–0	3–0	1–1	2–3
Middlesbrough U23s	1–2	4–3	0–2		0–1	2–1	2–3	1–2	2–2	0–0	2–2	0–0
Newcastle United U23s	0–3	5–2	0–5	1–3		2–1	2–4	0–1	3–2	5–0	4–2	2–0
Norwich City U23s	2–1	0–4	0–1	2–3	2–1		3–2	0–0	2–2	1–1	2–6	1–3
Reading U23s	3–2	3–0	0–1	2–2	0–2	4–3		2–0	2–1	4–1	0–0	2–2
Southampton U23s	0–1	2–1	1–1	2–0	2–1	4–1	1–2		2–0	5–1	1–0	3–2
Stoke City U23s	3–2	1–1	3–1	1–1	2–3	7–2	2–1	1–4		0–0	4–1	2–2
Sunderland U23s	0–1	1–1	1–1	1–3	2–3	1–1	1–0	0–2	1–2		2–1	0–1
West Bromwich Albion U23s	1–1	0–0	1–1	2–3	1–1	0–4	2–0	1–1	3–2	3–1		2–4
Wolverhampton Wanderers U23s	0–0	1–0	2–1	2–0	2–0	4–0	1–2	3–1	2–1	7–0	4–1	

Source: Premier League 2 Division 2 results
Legend: Blue = home team win; Yellow = draw; Red = away team win.

===== Play-offs =====
Semi-finals
2	Southampton U23s	2
5	Aston Villa U23s	0
3	Reading U23s	2 (2)
4	Newcastle United U23s	2 (3)

Final
2	Southampton U23s	2
4	Newcastle United U23s	1

==== Semifinals ====
3 May 2019
13:00

Reading U23s	2–2 (a.e.t.)	Newcastle United U23s
Howe 60'; Holsgrove 108'		Roberts 76'; Watts 120+2'
Penalties
Holsgrove (penalty missed); McIntyre (penalty missed); Liddle (penalty scored); Holmes (penalty missed); Frost (penalty scored)	2–3	(penalty scored) Bailey; (penalty missed) Watts; (penalty missed) Longstaff; (penalty scored) Sangare; (penalty scored) Sterry

Select Car Leasing Stadium, Reading
Attendance: 378
Referee: Alan Dale

3 May 2019
13:00

Southampton U23s	2–0	Aston Villa U23s
Smallbone 7'; O'Connor 71'	Report

St. Mary's Stadium, Southampton
Attendance: 623
Referee: Richard Hulme

==== Final ====
13 May 2019
13:00

Southampton U23s	2–1	Newcastle United U23s
Nlundulu 39'; Johnson 54'	Report	Bailey 81'

St. Mary's Stadium, Southampton
Attendance: 1,552
Referee: Sam Purkiss

== Top goalscorers ==
=== Division 1 ===
As of 3 May 2019

Rank	Player	Club	Goals
1	(Republic of Ireland) Aaron Connolly	Brighton & Hove Albion U23s	11
2	(Wales) Liam Cullen	Swansea City U23s	10
3	(England) Edward Nketiah	Arsenal U23s	9
3	(England) Bassala Sambou	Everton U23s	9
5	(Portugal) Rafael Camacho	Liverpool U23s	8
5	(Cyprus) Jack Roles	Tottenham Hotspur U23s	8
8	(England) Cameron Cresswell	Derby County U23s	7
8	(Sweden) Viktor Gyokeres	Brighton & Hove Albion U23s	7
8	(Portugal) Xande Silva	West Ham United U23s	7
8	(England) Bukayo Saka	Arsenal U23s	7
8	(Morocco) Nabil Touaizi	Leicester City U23s	7
8	(England) Joe Willock	Arsenal U23s	7

=== Division 2 ===
As of 13 May 2019

Rank	Player	Club	Goals
1	(Republic of Ireland) Adam Idah	Norwich City U23s	12
2	(Denmark) Elias Sørensen	Newcastle United U23s	11
3	(England) Benny Ashley-Seal	Wolverhampton Wanderers U23s	10
3	(England) Niall Ennis	Wolverhampton Wanderers U23s	10
3	(Cameroon) Danny Loader	Reading U23s	10
3	(England) Callum Roberts	Newcastle United U23s	10
7	(Scotland) Ben House	Reading U23s	8
8	(England) Marcus Barnes	Southampton U23s	9
8	(England) Tyrone O'Neill	Middlesbrough U23s	9
8	(England) Anthony Spyrou	Norwich City U23s	9

=== Hat-tricks ===
As of 13 May 2019

Player	For	Against	Result	Date	Division	Ref.
(Morocco) Nabil Touaizi	Manchester City U23s	Arsenal U23s	6–5 (H)	11 August 2018	Division 1	
(Portugal) Xande Silva	West Ham United U23s	Tottenham Hotspur U23s	1–3 (A)	13 August 2018	Division 1	
(Morocco) Nabil Touaizi	Manchester City U23s	West Ham United U23s	4–6 (A)	19 August 2018	Division 1	
(Republic of Ireland) Adam Idah	Norwich City U23s	West Bromwich Albion U23s	0–4 (A)	27 August 2018	Division 2	
(England) Benny Ashley-Seal	Wolverhampton Wanderers U23s	Norwich City U23s	1–3 (A)	31 August 2018	Division 2	
(Wales) Rabbi Matondo	Manchester City U23s	Swansea City U23s	1–4 (A)	29 September 2018	Division 1	
(Denmark) Elias Sorensen	Newcastle United U23s	Aston Villa U23s	2–5 (A)	22 October 2018	Division 2	
(England) Ashley Fletcher	Middlesbrough U23s	Newcastle United U23s	1–3 (A)	26 October 2018	Division 2	
(England) Morgan Rogers^{4}	West Bromwich Albion U23s	Norwich City U23s	2–6 (A)	1 February 2019	Division 2	
(Portugal) Rafael Camacho	Liverpool U23s	Leicester City U23s	0–6 (A)	14 April 2019	Division 1	
(Cyprus) Jack Roles	Tottenham Hotspur U23s	Derby County U23s	3–1 (H)	29 April 2019	Division 1	

Note

(H) – Home; (A) – Away
^{4} – player scored 4 goals

=== Awards ===
Player of the Season: (Republic of Ireland) Aaron Connolly (Brighton & Hove Albion U23s)

=== Player of the Month ===
Month	Player	Club	Ref.
August	(Cameroon) Danny Loader	Reading U23s	
September	(England) Oliver Skipp	Tottenham Hotspur U23s	
October	(Republic of Ireland) Josh Barrett	Reading U23s	
November	(Republic of Ireland) Aaron Connolly	Brighton & Hove Albion U23s	
December	(England) Josh Knight	Leicester City U23s	
January	(England) Kazaiah Sterling	Tottenham Hotspur U23s	
February	(England) Morgan Rogers	West Bromwich Albion U23s	
March	(England) Lewis Gibson	Everton U23s	
April	(England) Mason Greenwood	Manchester United U23s	

== Professional Development League ==
U23 Professional Development League
- Season: 2018–19
- Champions: Leeds United U23s (1st Title)
- Regular Season Champions: Leeds United U23s (1st Title)
- Matches: 283 (280 RS, 3 PO)
- Goals: 898 (3.17 per match) (890 RS, 8 PO)
- Top goalscorer: (England) Dan Agyei Burnley U23s (15 Goals)
- Biggest home win: Ipswich Town U23s 8–0 Hull City U23s (20 August 2018)
- Biggest away win: Watford U23s 2–6 Queens Park Rangers U23s (29 October 2018)
- Highest scoring: Burnley U23s 3–6 Leeds United U23s (11 December 2018); Coventry City U23s 6–3 Crystal Palace U23s (14 December 2018); Queens Park Rangers U23s 3–6 Charlton Athletic U23s (4 February 2019)
- Longest winning run: 5 Matches Crewe Alexandra U23s
- Longest unbeaten run: 12 Matches Ipswich Town U23s
- Longest winless run: 11 Matches Hull City U23s
- Longest losing run: 6 Matches Watford U23s
- Highest attendance: 7,818 Leeds United U23s 0–0 Birmingham City U23s (6 May 2019)

The Professional Development League season is the seventh campaign of post-EPPP Under-23 football's second tier, designed for those academies with Category 2 status. A total of 20 teams are split regionally into north and south divisions, with each team facing opponents in their own region twice both home and away and opponents in the other region once for a total of 28 games. The sides finishing in the top two positions in both regions at the end of the season will progress to a knockout stage to determine the overall league champion. Bolton Wanderers U23s are the defending champions. 20 Teams competed in the league this season, 1 fewer than last season. Huddersfield Town U23s dropped out of the league at the end of the 2017-18 campaign after 6 seasons as part of their academy restructuring process.

=== Tables ===
==== North Division ====
Pos	Team	Pld	W	D	L	GF	GA	GD	Pts	Qualification
1	Leeds United U23s	28	17	6	5	59	31	+28	57	Qualification for Knock-out stage
2	Birmingham City U23s	28	14	6	8	47	25	+22	48	Qualification for Knock-out stage
3	Crewe Alexandra U23s	28	13	8	7	46	37	+9	47	
4	Burnley U23s	28	14	3	11	61	48	+13	45	
5	Nottingham Forest U23s	28	12	7	9	53	42	+11	43	
6	Bolton Wanderers U23s	28	13	4	11	39	42	−3	43	
7	Barnsley U23s	28	10	9	9	36	44	−8	39	
8	Sheffield Wednesday U23s	28	11	5	12	35	46	−11	38	
9	Sheffield United U23s	28	9	9	10	35	41	−6	36	
10	Hull City U23s	28	5	6	17	30	57	−27	21	

==== South Division ====
Pos	Team	Pld	W	D	L	GF	GA	GD	Pts	Qualification
1	Ipswich Town U23s	28	15	7	6	67	38	+29	52	Qualification for Knock-out stage
2	Coventry City U23s	28	13	6	9	49	38	+11	45	Qualification for Knock-out stage
3	Crystal Palace U23s	28	12	6	10	55	49	+6	42	
4	Charlton Athletic U23s	28	11	7	10	44	41	+3	40	
5	Bristol City U23s	28	11	5	12	45	49	−4	38	
6	Millwall U23s	28	10	7	11	32	31	+1	37	
7	Cardiff City U23s	28	8	8	12	41	43	−2	32	
8	Queens Park Rangers U23s	28	8	7	13	54	61	−7	31	
9	Watford U23s	28	6	6	16	32	50	−18	24	
10	Colchester United U23s	28	6	2	20	30	77	−47	20	

=== Knock-out stage ===
Semi-finals

29 April 2019
19:00

Leeds United U23s	3–2 (a.e.t.)	Coventry City U23s
Gotts 4'; Edmondson 84'; Temenuzhkov 114'		Bremang 59'; Eccles 90+3'

Elland Road, Beeston

30 April 2019
19:00

Ipswich Town U23s	0–3	Birmingham City U23s
		O'Keeffe 2'; George 25'; Hurst 90+4'

Portman Road, Ipswich

Final

6 May 2019
19:00

Leeds United U23s	0–0 (a.e.t.)	Birmingham City U23s
	Report
Penalties
Bogusz (penalty missed); Struijk (penalty scored); Edmondson (penalty scored); Temenuzhkov (penalty scored); Clarke (penalty scored)	4–2	(penalty scored) McCoy; (penalty scored) Bajrami; (penalty missed) Redmond; (penalty missed) Boyd-Munce

Elland Road, Beeston
Attendance: 7,818

=== Top goalscorers ===
As of 6 May 2019

Rank	Player	Club	Goals
1	(Ghana) Dan Agyei	Burnley U23s	15
2	(Wales) Brennan Johnson	Nottingham Forest U23s	14
3	(Zimbabwe) Tinashe Chakwana	Burnley U23s	11
3	(England) Ryan Edmondson	Leeds United U23s	11
3	(England) Aramide Oteh	Queens Park Rangers U23s	11
6	(England) David Bremang	Coventry City U23s	10
6	(Republic of Ireland) Kian Flanagan	Crystal Palace U23s	10
6	(England) Oliver Finney	Crewe Alexandra U23s	10
6	(England) Michael Folivi	Watford U23s	10
6	(England) Lewis Reilly	Crewe Alexandra U23s	10
11	(Australia) Ben Folami	Ipswich Town U23s	9
11	(England) Keane Lewis-Potter	Hull City U23s	9
11	(England) Levi Lumeka	Crystal Palace U23s	9
11	(England) Luca Navarro	Bolton Wanderers U23s/Hull City U23s	9
11	(England) Mason Saunders-Henry	Millwall U23s	9

=== Hat-tricks ===
As of 6 May 2019

Player	For	Against	Result	Date	Ref.
(England) Danny Rowe	Ipswich Town U23s	Hull City U23s	8–0 (H)	20 August 2018	
(England) Kyle McFarlane	Birmingham City U23s	Colchester United U23s	4–2 (H)	25 August 2018	
(Republic of Ireland) Kian Flanagan	Crystal Palace U23s	Barnsley U23s	4–0 (H)	3 September 2018	
(Zimbabwe) Tinashe Chakwana^{4}	Burnley U23s	Sheffield United U23s	6–0 (H)	22 October 2018	
(England) Ryan Edmondson	Leeds United U23s	Barnsley U23s	1–4 (A)	22 October 2018	
(England) Patrick Bamford	Leeds United U23s	Burnley U23s	3–6 (A)	11 December 2018	
(Wales) James Waite	Cardiff City U23s	Colchester United U23s	7–0 (H)	17 December 2018	
(England) Lewis Reilly	Crewe Alexandra U23s	Sheffield United U23s	4–2 (H)	7 January 2019	
(England) Teddy Bishop	Ipswich Town U23s	Millwall U23s	5–0 (H)	28 January 2019	
(Wales) Ricardo Rees	Bristol City U23s	Queens Park Rangers U23s	1–4 (A)	18 February 2019	
(Wales) Brennan Johnson	Nottingham Forest U23s	Ipswich Town U23s	1–4 (A)	15 April 2019	

Note

(H) – Home; (A) – Away

== See also ==
- 2018–19 in English football
