= Aaron Connolly (Irish footballer) =

Irish footballer (born 2000)

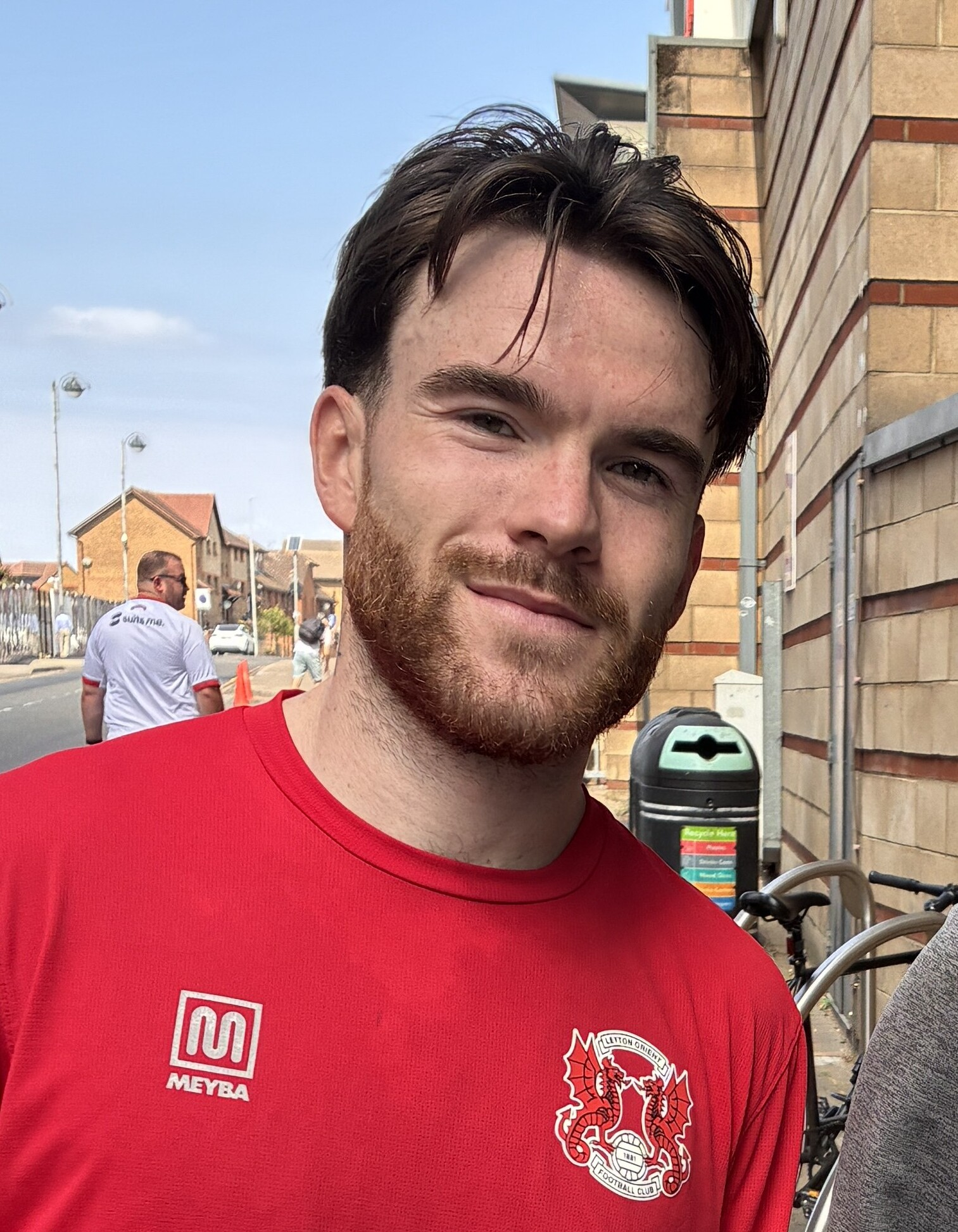
- Connolly with Leyton Orient in 2026

Personal information
- Full name: Aaron Anthony Connolly
- Date of birth: 28 January 2000 (age 26)
- Place of birth: Castlegar, County Galway, Ireland
- Height: 1.75 m (5 ft 9 in)
- Position: Forward

Team information
- Current team: Leyton Orient
- Number: 10

Youth career
- 2005–2011: Maree/Oranmore FC
- 2011–2016: Mervue United
- 2016–2019: Brighton & Hove Albion

Senior career*
Years	Team	Apps	(Gls)
2017–2023	Brighton & Hove Albion	45	(5)
2019	→ Luton Town (loan)	2	(0)
2022	→ Middlesbrough (loan)	18	(2)
2022–2023	→ Venezia (loan)	5	(0)
2023	→ Hull City (loan)	5	(2)
2023–2024	Hull City	28	(8)
2024–2025	Sunderland	10	(1)
2025	Millwall	14	(1)
2025–	Leyton Orient	27	(9)

International career
2016–2017	Republic of Ireland U17	10	(7)
2017–2018	Republic of Ireland U19	3	(1)
2019–2022	Republic of Ireland U21	13	(1)
2019–2023	Republic of Ireland	9	(0)
- * Club domestic league appearances and goals as of 18:35, 31 October 2026 (UTC)

Aaron Anthony Connolly (born 28 January 2000) is an Irish professional footballer who plays as a forward for EFL League One club Leyton Orient.

== Club career ==
=== Brighton & Hove Albion ===
Connolly was born in Galway and started his career in the youth team of Maree/Oranmore FC in 2005. He joined Mervue United's youth team at the age of 11. In the summer of 2016 he joined Premier League side Brighton & Hove Albion on trial, impressing enough for the club to offer him a two-year scholarship with the under-18 side. He was fast-tracked in the under-23 side and also went on to make his debut for the first team at the age of 17 when he appeared as a substitute for Tomer Hemed in the 1–0 EFL Cup win over Barnet in August 2017. He signed a new three-and-a-half-year contract with Brighton on 31 January 2019.

==== Loan to Luton Town ====
On 31 January 2019, Connolly joined League One leaders Luton Town on loan for the remainder of the 2018–19 season. He officially joined up with Luton on 2 April 2019 after returning from injury. Connolly made his football league and Luton debut on 13 April coming on in the 68th minute at 1–1 away to Charlton. Luton went on to lose 3–1 at The Valley.

==== Return to Brighton ====
On 27 August 2019, Connolly scored his first senior goal in a 2–1 away win over Bristol Rovers in the EFL Cup. He made his league debut for Brighton four days later, coming on as a substitute for Neal Maupay in the 66th minute of a 4–0 defeat away to Manchester City. Connolly made another appearance from the bench in The Seagulls' next fixture, a 1–1 home draw against Burnley on 14 September. He made his first Premier League start on 5 October in a match against Tottenham Hotspur where he scored his first two Premier League goals in the 3–0 home victory. Connolly's next goal came in the last game of the season in a 2–1 away win over Burnley, finishing the season with three goals in 24 league appearances. He signed a new four-year contract with Brighton in July 2020.

Connolly scored his first goal of the 2020–21 season in Brighton's second league match scoring The Albion's third in a 3–0 away win at Newcastle. He scored his second goal of the season on the second day of the new year tapping The Seagulls into the lead in an eventual 3–3 draw in which he came off injured at the break against Wolves. Connolly came on as a substitute in Brighton's 1–0 away victory over defending champions Liverpool on 3 February claiming their first league win at Anfield since 1982.

Connolly scored his first goal of the 2021–22 season scoring a brace and the only goals in the 2–0 EFL Cup third round home victory over Swansea City on 22 September. He made his first Premier League start of the campaign on 15 December, where his fourth overall league appearance of the season only lasted 61 minutes, being replaced by Alexis Mac Allister in the 1–0 home defeat against Wolves.

==== Loan to Middlesbrough ====
On 2 January 2022, Connolly joined Championship club Middlesbrough on loan until the end of the season. He made his Boro and Championship debut on 15 January, playing 67 minutes before being replaced by fellow loanee Folarin Balogun in the eventual 2–1 home victory over Reading. Connolly featured as a substitute in the eventual penalty shootout victory over Manchester United in the FA Cup fourth round at Old Trafford on 4 February. Eight days later he scored his first goal for Boro, in the 4–1 home victory over Derby County, putting Middlesbrough into a play-off spot. It took Connolly eight further games to score his second goal for the side, opening the scoreline in the 2–0 away win over Birmingham City on 15 March.

==== Loan to Venezia ====
On 14 July 2022, Connolly joined Italian Serie B club Venezia on a loan deal for the 2022–23 season.

==== Loan to Hull City ====
On 6 January 2023, Connolly returned early from Venezia and joined Hull City on a loan deal until the end of the season. He made his debut a day later, coming on as 61st-minute substitute replacing Harvey Vale, in the 2–0 FA Cup third round home loss to Premier League opposition Fulham. On 28 January, Connolly's 23rd birthday, he scored his first Hull goals, netting two in the 3–0 home win over Queens Park Rangers.

=== Hull City ===
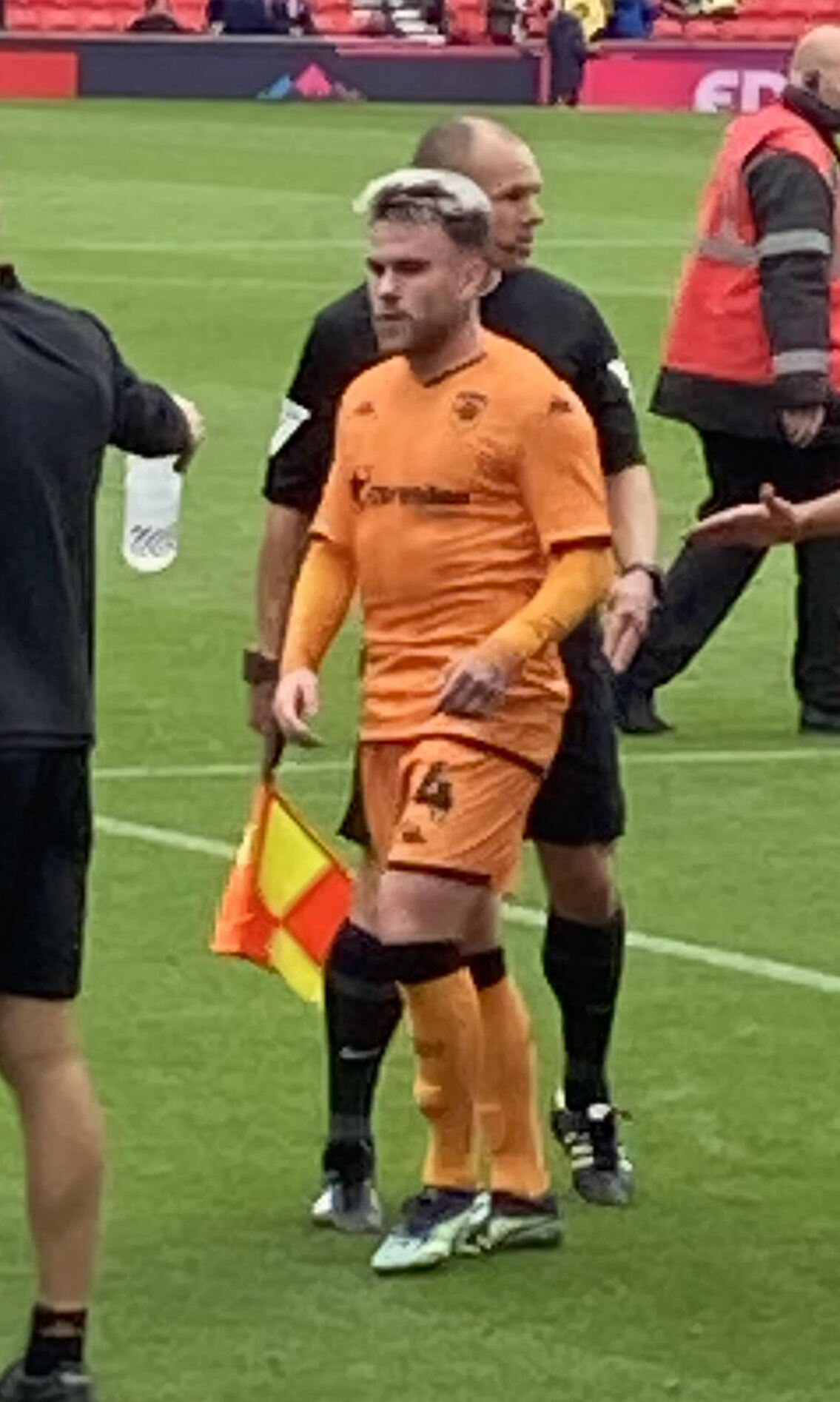
Connolly with Hull City in 2023.

On 2 August 2023, Connolly signed a one-year deal with Hull City for an undisclosed fee. On 12 August 2023, Connolly came off the bench against Sheffield Wednesday to score his first goal as a permanent player for Hull City. On 19 May 2024, the club announced he would be released in the summer when his contract expired.

=== Sunderland ===
On 24 September 2024, Connolly joined Championship side Sunderland on a one-year deal. On 23 November 2024, Connolly scored his first goal for Sunderland in a 1–1 draw at Millwall. The game was temporarily suspended towards the end of the first half because of a medical emergency in the crowd.

=== Millwall ===
On 16 January 2025, Connolly signed for fellow Championship club Millwall on a permanent basis. He scored his first goal for the club on 1 February 2025 in a 2–1 win at home to Queens Park Rangers, opening the scoring after just 30 seconds.

On 19 May 2025, the club announced the player would be leaving in June when his contract expired.

=== Leyton Orient ===
On 7 July 2025, Connolly signed for EFL League One side Leyton Orient on a 2-year contract. He was named EFL League One Player of the Month for November 2025 following a run of three goals and two assists.

== International career ==
Connolly has represented the Republic of Ireland at under-17, under-19 and under-21 level. He was leading goalscorer in the qualifying stage for the 2017 UEFA European Under-17 Championship, scoring seven goals in six matches. He featured in all four matches in the final tournament held in Croatia, but failed to score as Ireland were eliminated by England in the quarter-finals.

Connolly was included in the Republic of Ireland U21 squad for the 2019 Toulon Tournament. Connolly started Ireland's opening group match vs China U23 and marked it with a goal and an assist for Zak Elbouzedi in a 4–1 win.

On 5 October 2019, he received his first call-up for the Republic of Ireland senior team for the Euro 2020 qualifying matches against Georgia and Switzerland. He made his debut against Georgia on 12 October 2019, replacing James Collins when he came on as a substitute in the 79th minute in the 0–0 away draw.

After over a year without a cap at senior level, Connolly made a return to the Republic of Ireland U21 side in November 2022, when he was called up for their double header of games against Israel U21 in the 2023 UEFA European Under-21 Championship Qualification Play-offs.

== Personal life ==
On 10 October 2024, World Mental Health Day, Connolly spoke of his alcohol addiction issues and the impact it had on his football career.

== Career statistics ==
=== Club ===
As of match played 25 April 2026

Appearances and goals by club, season and competition
Club	Season	League			National cup (Note: Includes FA Cup, Coppa Italia)		League cup (Note: Includes EFL Cup)		Other		Total	
Club	Season	Division	Apps	Goals	Apps	Goals	Apps	Goals	Apps	Goals	Apps	Goals
Brighton & Hove Albion U21	2017–18	—			—		—		2 (Note: Appearances in EFL Trophy)	0	2	0
Brighton & Hove Albion U21	2018–19	—			—		—		3	5	3	5
Brighton & Hove Albion U21	Total		—		—		—		5	5	5	5
Brighton & Hove Albion	2017–18	Premier League	0	0	0	0	1	0	—		1	0
Brighton & Hove Albion	2018–19	Premier League	0	0	0	0	1	0	—		1	0
Brighton & Hove Albion	2019–20	Premier League	24	3	1	0	2	1	—		27	4
Brighton & Hove Albion	2020–21	Premier League	17	2	0	0	0	0	—		17	2
Brighton & Hove Albion	2021–22	Premier League	4	0	0	0	2	2	—		6	2
Brighton & Hove Albion	Total		45	5	1	0	6	3	—		52	8
Luton Town (loan)	2018–19	League One	2	0	—		—		—		2	0
Middlesbrough (loan)	2021–22	Championship	18	2	2	0	—		—		20	2
Venezia (loan)	2022–23	Serie B	5	0	0	0	—		—		5	0
Hull City (loan)	2022–23	Championship	5	2	1	0	—		—		6	2
Hull City	2023–24	Championship	28	8	1	0	1	0	—		30	8
Hull City	Total		33	10	2	0	1	0	—		36	10
Sunderland	2024–25	Championship	10	1	1	0	—		—		11	1
Millwall	2024–25	Championship	14	1	—		—		—		14	1
Leyton Orient	2025–26	League One	20	8	2	0	0	0	1	1	23	9
Career total			147	27	8	0	7	3	6	6	168	36

=== International ===
As of match played 7 September 2023

Appearances and goals by national team and year
National team	Year	Apps	Goals
Republic of Ireland
Republic of Ireland	2019	2	0
Republic of Ireland	2020	3	0
Republic of Ireland	2021	3	0
Republic of Ireland	2022	0	0
Republic of Ireland	2023	1	0
Total		9	0

== Honours ==
Individual

- Premier League 2 Player of the Month: November 2018
- Premier League 2 Player of the Season: 2018-19
- Premier League 2 Division 1 Top Scorer: 2018-19
- EFL League One Player of the Month: November 2025
