= 2019–20 Brighton & Hove Albion F.C. season =

118th season in existence of Brighton & Hove Albion

Brighton & Hove Albion
2019–20 season
- Chairman: Tony Bloom
- Head coach: Graham Potter
- Stadium: Falmer Stadium
- Premier League: 15th
- FA Cup: Third round
- EFL Cup: Third round
- Top goalscorer: League: Neal Maupay (10); All: Neal Maupay (10)
- Highest home attendance: 30,640 vs Leicester City (23 November – Premier League)
- Lowest home attendance: 14,982 vs Aston Villa (25 September – EFL Cup)
- Biggest win: 3–0 vs Watford (10 August – Premier League); 3–0 vs Tottenham Hotspur (5 October – Premier League)
- Biggest defeat: 0–5 vs Manchester City (11 July – Premier League)
Home colours	Away colours	Third colours

The 2019–20 season was Brighton & Hove Albion's 118th year in existence and third consecutive season in the Premier League. Along with competing in the Premier League, the club also participated in the FA Cup and EFL Cup. The season covered the period from 1 July 2019 to 26 July 2020.

On 14 March 2020, The FA made the decision to suspend the season due to the COVID-19 pandemic. The season recommenced on 17 June, with Brighton's fixture against Arsenal rescheduled for the 20 June.

== Summary ==
On the back of four wins in five matches in pre-season, Brighton began their league campaign with a 3–0 away win over Watford, which was Potter's first competitive game in charge of the club. The Seagulls drew 1–1 with West Ham in their first competitive home game of the season. Brighton's first defeat came in the third game of the season in a 2–0 home loss to Southampton where Florin Andone was sent off for a wild challenge on Yan Valery. On 5 October, Brighton stunned Tottenham Hotspur by beating them 3–0 at Falmer Stadium with Aaron Connolly scoring 2 goals in his first ever Premier League start.

Brighton's first cup game came away against Bristol Rovers where the Seagulls won 2–1 in the EFL Cup. They were knocked out in the next round on 25 September, losing 3–1 at home to Aston Villa where 10 Albion players made their debut in the youthful side of an average age of just over 21.

After reaching the quarter-final and the semi-final of the FA Cup in the previous two seasons Brighton were knocked out in their first match (third round) of this season's competition to Sheffield Wednesday, losing 1–0 at home.

Brighton's goalless draw at Wolves on 7 March 2020 was their last until 20 June due to the COVID-19 pandemic. The Seagulls first game back came against Arsenal at home on 20 June 2020, where they achieved their first ever double over the London side, winning the match 2–1. This, like the rest of the upcoming matches was played behind closed doors.

Brighton secured their Premier League status on 20 July in a 0–0 home draw against Newcastle, earning a 4th consecutive season in the top flight. The Seagulls beat Burnley 2–1 on the final game of the season finishing the season with 41 points, their highest tally in a Premier League season, also finishing with their highest number of goals scored (39) and their joint highest finish (15th).

== Players ==
=== Squad ===
Note: Flags indicate national team as defined under FIFA eligibility rules; some limited exceptions apply. Players may hold more than one non-FIFA nationality.

No.	Pos.	Nation	Player
1	GK	AUS	Mathew Ryan
2	DF	ENG	Tariq Lamptey
4	DF	IRL	Shane Duffy
5	DF	ENG	Lewis Dunk (Captain)
6	MF	ENG	Dale Stephens
7	FW	FRA	Neal Maupay
8	MF	MLI	Yves Bissouma
10	MF	ARG	Alexis Mac Allister
11	MF	BEL	Leandro Trossard
13	MF	GER	Pascal Groß
15	DF	ENG	Adam Webster
16	FW	IRN	Alireza Jahanbakhsh
17	FW	ENG	Glenn Murray (Vice-captain)

No.	Pos.	Nation	Player
18	MF	AUS	Aaron Mooy
19	FW	COL	José Izquierdo
20	MF	ENG	Solly March
21	DF	ITA	Ezequiel Schelotto
22	DF	ESP	Martín Montoya
23	GK	ENG	Jason Steele
24	MF	NED	Davy Pröpper
25	MF	ISR	Beram Kayal
27	GK	ENG	David Button
30	DF	BRA	Bernardo
33	DF	ENG	Dan Burn
44	FW	IRL	Aaron Connolly
46	MF	COL	Steven Alzate

=== Out on loan ===
Note: Flags indicate national team as defined under FIFA eligibility rules; some limited exceptions apply. Players may hold more than one non-FIFA nationality.

No.	Pos.	Nation	Player
—	MF	FRA	Anthony Knockaert (at Fulham until 30 June 2020)
—	FW	RSA	Percy Tau (at Club Brugge until 30 June 2020)
—	GK	ENG	Christian Walton (at Blackburn Rovers until 30 June 2020)
—	DF	ENG	Matt Clarke (at Derby County until 30 June 2020)
—	FW	ROU	Florin Andone (at Galatasaray until 30 June 2020)

Note

All loan spells, except Percy Tau's loan at Club Brugge extended to the end of each respective league season due to the breaks enforced as a result of COVID-19. Tau returned to Brighton on 30 June 2020 as Club Brugge were announced as the Belgium champions in May, with the league permanently suspended with one remaining match.

Fulham took up their option to buy Anthony Knockaert on 9 July 2020.

== Transfers ==
=== Transfers in ===
Date	Position	Nationality	Name	From	Fee	Ref.
1 July 2019	CB	(England)	Matthew Clarke	(England) Portsmouth	Undisclosed	
1 July 2019	LW	(Belgium)	Leandro Trossard	(Belgium) Genk	£18,000,000	
18 July 2019	CM	(England)	Taylor Richards	(England) Manchester City	Undisclosed	
19 July 2019	RW	(England)	Todd Miller	(England) Colchester United	Undisclosed	
27 July 2019	CM	(Wales)	Andrew Crofts	(England) Yeovil Town	Free transfer	
29 July 2019	LB	(England)	Lewis Freestone	(England) Peterborough United	Free transfer	
3 August 2019	CB	(England)	Adam Webster	(England) Bristol City	£20,000,000	
5 August 2019	CF	(France)	Neal Maupay	(England) Brentford	Undisclosed	
8 August 2019	RB	(France)	Romaric Yapi	(France) Paris Saint-Germain	Undisclosed	
11 January 2020	MF	(England)	Markus Ifill	(England) Swindon Town	Undisclosed	
24 January 2020	CM	(Australia)	Aaron Mooy	(England) Huddersfield Town	Undisclosed	
31 January 2020	RB	(England)	Tariq Lamptey	(England) Chelsea	Undisclosed	

=== Loans in ===
Date from	Position	Nationality	Name	From	Date until	Ref.
8 August 2019	CM	(Australia)	Aaron Mooy	(England) Huddersfield Town	24 January 2020	

=== Loans out ===
Date from	Position	Nationality	Name	To	Date until	Ref.
1 July 2019	AM	(Argentina)	Alexis Mac Allister	(Argentina) Boca Juniors	31 January 2020	
1 July 2019	CB	(England)	Ben White	(England) Leeds United	30 June 2020	
18 July 2019	CB	(Norway)	Leo Skiri Østigård	(Germany) St. Pauli	30 June 2020	
21 July 2019	RW	(France)	Anthony Knockaert	(England) Fulham	30 June 2020	
23 July 2019	CM	(Republic of Ireland)	Jayson Molumby	(England) Millwall	30 June 2020	
23 July 2019	GK	(England)	Christian Walton	(England) Blackburn Rovers	30 June 2020	
24 July 2019	CF	(Slovenia)	Jan Mlakar	(England) Queens Park Rangers	30 June 2020	
24 July 2019	GK	(Spain)	Robert Sánchez	(England) Rochdale	30 June 2020	
25 July 2019	CF	(Sweden)	Viktor Gyökeres	(Germany) St. Pauli	30 June 2020	
29 July 2019	CF	(South Africa)	Percy Tau	(Belgium) Club Brugge	30 June 2020	
2 August 2019	CB	(England)	Matthew Clarke	(England) Derby County	30 June 2020	
5 August 2019	GK	(England)	Carl Rushworth	(England) Worthing	30 June 2020	
5 August 2019	GK	(England)	Roco Rees	(England) Worthing	Work experience	
8 August 2019	CM	(Israel)	Beram Kayal	(England) Charlton Athletic	30 June 2020	
23 August 2019	RW	(Denmark)	Anders Dreyer	(Netherlands) Heerenveen	5 January 2020	
29 August 2019	CF	(Netherlands)	Jürgen Locadia	(Germany) Hoffenheim	3 February 2020	
1 September 2019	LM	(Netherlands)	Soufyan Ahannach	(Belgium) Union Saint-Gilloise	19 January 2020	
2 September 2019	CF	(Romania)	Florin Andone	(Turkey) Galatasaray	30 June 2020	
2 September 2019	LB	(England)	George Cox	(Netherlands) Fortuna Sittard	30 June 2020	
2 September 2019	CM	(England)	Max Sanders	(England) AFC Wimbledon	30 June 2020	
2 September 2019	AM	(England)	James Tilley	(England) Yeovil Town	15 January 2020	
16 January 2020	DM	(Romania)	Tudor Băluță	(Netherlands) ADO Den Haag	30 June 2020	
24 January 2020	GK	(England)	Tom McGill	(England) Crawley Town	30 June 2020	
31 January 2020	GK	(England)	Fynn Talley	(England) Burgess Hill Town	31 May 2020	
31 January 2020	CB	(Nigeria)	Leon Balogun	(England) Wigan Athletic	30 June 2020	
31 January 2020	CB	(Poland)	Kacper Łopata	(Poland) Zagłębie Sosnowiec	30 June 2020	
31 January 2020	CF	(Slovenia)	Jan Mlakar	(England) Wigan Athletic	30 June 2020	
31 January 2020	CF	(Serbia)	Bojan Radulovic	(Spain) Deportivo Alavés B	30 June 2020	
3 February 2020	CF	(Netherlands)	Jürgen Locadia	(United States) FC Cincinnati	5 July 2020	
20 February 2020	CM	(Wales)	Marcus Dackers	(England) Lancing	30 June 2020	

=== Transfers out ===
Date	Position	Nationality	Name	To	Fee	Ref.
1 July 2019	CM	(Canada)	Jordan Araujo	(Portugal) GD Bragança	Released	
1 July 2019	CB	(England)	Ben Barclay	(England) Accrington Stanley	Released	
1 July 2019	GK	(England)	George Bentley	(England) Horsham	Released	
1 July 2019	RB	(Spain)	Bruno	Retired		
1 July 2019	CB	(France)	Julien Carre	(England) Brentford	Released	
1 July 2019	CM	(England)	Will Collar	(Scotland) Hamilton Academical	Released	
1 July 2019	GK	(England)	Billy Collings	(England) Lewes	Released	
1 July 2019	CB	(Northern Ireland)	Ben Hall	(Scotland) Partick Thistle	Released	
1 July 2019	CB	(Scotland)	Josh Kerr	(Scotland) Airdrieonians	Released	
1 July 2019	FW	(Iceland)	Stefan Ljubicic	(Iceland) Grindavík	Released	
1 July 2019	RB	(Czech Republic)	Aleš Matějů	(Italy) Brescia	Undisclosed	
1 July 2019	RB	(England)	Owen Moore	Free agent	Released	
1 July 2019	LB	(England)	Joe Tomlinson	(England) Hungerford Town	Released	
1 July 2019	CM	(Republic of Ireland)	Richie Towell	(England) Salford City	Free transfer	
1 July 2019	CB	(Denmark)	Matthew Weaire	(England) Colchester United	Released	
1 July 2019	GK	(Poland)	Piotr Zalewski	(Italy) Hellas Verona	Released	
26 July 2019	LB	(England)	Cameron Tutt	(England) Worthing	Free transfer	
30 July 2019	LB	(Austria)	Markus Suttner	(Germany) Fortuna Düsseldorf	Undisclosed	
19 August 2019	CF	(Israel)	Tomer Hemed	(England) Charlton Athletic	Released	
7 January 2020	RW	(Denmark)	Anders Dreyer	(Denmark) FC Midtjylland	Undisclosed	
15 January 2020	AM	(England)	James Tilley	(England) Grimsby Town	Undisclosed	
20 January 2020	LW	(Netherlands)	Soufyan Ahannach	(Netherlands) Go Ahead Eagles	Free Transfer	
30 January 2020	LB	(Cameroon)	Gaëtan Bong	(England) Nottingham Forest	Undisclosed	
21 April 2020	CB	(England)	Tareq Shihab	Retired		
9 July 2020	RW	(France)	Anthony Knockaert	(England) Fulham	Undisclosed	

== Pre-season friendlies ==
In June 2019, The Seagulls confirmed their pre-season schedule.

13 July 2019 Friendly	FC Liefering	2–5	Brighton & Hove Albion	Bischofshofen, Austria
14:00 CEST	Aigner 22'; Adamu 33'	Report	Dunk 11'; Murray 32'; Locadia 40'; Trossard 47'; Andone 84'	Stadium: Sportzplatz

19 July 2019 Friendly	Crawley Town	0–1	Brighton & Hove Albion	Crawley
19:45 BST		Report	Richards 84' (pen.)	Stadium: The People's Pension Stadium

20 July 2019 Friendly	Fulham	2–1	Brighton & Hove Albion	Fulham
15:00 BST	Cairney 50', 59'	Report	Groß 25'	Stadium: Craven Cottage

27 July 2019 Friendly	Birmingham City	0–4	Brighton & Hove Albion	Bordesley
15:00 BST		Report	Murray 8'; Locadia 18'; Duffy 73', 90'	Stadium: St Andrew's Trillion Trophy Stadium

2 August 2019 Bruno Testimonial Match	Brighton & Hove Albion	2–1	Valencia	Falmer
19:00 BST	Murray 39' (pen.); Duffy 87'	Report	Rodrigo 28'	Stadium: Falmer Stadium; Attendance: 16,217; Referee: David Coote (England)

== Competitions ==
=== Premier League ===
==== League table ====
Pos	Team	Pld	W	D	L	GF	GA	GD	Pts
13	Newcastle United	38	11	11	16	38	58	−20	44
14	Crystal Palace	38	11	10	17	31	50	−19	43
15	Brighton & Hove Albion	38	9	14	15	39	54	−15	41
16	West Ham United	38	10	9	19	49	62	−13	39
17	Aston Villa	38	9	8	21	41	67	−26	35

Source: Premier League
Rules for classification: 1) Points; 2) Goal difference; 3) Goals scored; 4) If the champions, relegated teams or qualified teams for UEFA competitions cannot be determined by rules 1 to 3, rules 4.1 to 4.3 are applied – 4.1) Points gained in head to head record between such teams; 4.2) Away goals scored in head to head record between such teams; 4.3) Play-offs

==== Results summary ====
Overall								Home						Away					
Pld	W	D	L	GF	GA	GD	Pts	W	D	L	GF	GA	GD	W	D	L	GF	GA	GD
38	9	14	15	39	54	−15	41	5	7	7	20	27	−7	4	7	8	19	27	−8

Last updated: 26 July 2020.
Source: Premier League

==== Results by matchday ====
Round	1	2	3	4	5	6	7	8	9	10	11	12	13	14	15	16	17	18	19	20	21	22	23	24	25	26	27	28	29	30	31	32	33	34	35	36	37	38
Ground	A	H	H	A	H	A	A	H	A	H	H	A	H	A	A	H	A	H	A	H	H	A	H	A	A	H	A	H	A	H	A	H	A	H	H	A	H	A
Result	W	D	L	L	D	D	L	W	L	W	W	L	L	L	W	D	D	L	L	W	D	L	D	L	D	D	D	L	D	W	D	L	W	L	L	D	D	W
Position	4	5	8	16	16	15	16	14	16	14	8	11	14	15	13	12	13	13	15	14	14	14	15	15	15	15	15	15	15	15	15	15	15	15	15	16	16	15

Updated to match(es) played on 26 July 2020. Source: Statto.com
A = Away; H = Home; W = Win; D = Draw; L = Loss

==== Matches ====
On 13 June 2019, the Premier League fixtures were announced.

10 August 2019 1	Watford	0–3	Brighton & Hove Albion	Watford
15:00 BST		Report	Doucouré 28' (o.g.); Andone 65'; Maupay 77'; Dunk (yellow card) 88'	Stadium: Vicarage Road; Attendance: 20,245; Referee: Craig Pawson

17 August 2019 2	Brighton & Hove Albion	1–1	West Ham United	Falmer
15:00 BST	Trossard 65'	Report	Hernández 61'; Masuaku (yellow card) 76'; Rice (yellow card) 90+4'	Stadium: Falmer Stadium; Attendance: 30,459; Referee: Anthony Taylor

24 August 2019 3	Brighton & Hove Albion	0–2	Southampton	Falmer
15:00 BST	Andone (red card) 30'; Montoya (yellow card) 89'	Report	Ward-Prowse (yellow card) 21'; Djenepo 55', (yellow card) 62'; Højbjerg (yellow card) 82'; Redmond 90+1'	Stadium: Falmer Stadium; Attendance: 30,019; Referee: Kevin Friend

31 August 2019 4	Manchester City	4–0	Brighton & Hove Albion	Manchester
15:00 BST	De Bruyne 2'; Laporte (yellow card) 36'; Agüero 42', 55'; B. Silva 79'	Report	Dunk (yellow card) 83'	Stadium: City of Manchester Stadium; Attendance: 54,386; Referee: Jon Moss

14 September 2019 5	Brighton & Hove Albion	1–1	Burnley	Falmer
15:00 BST	Maupay 51'	Report	Lennon (yellow card) 27'; Westwood (yellow card) 83'; Hendrick 90+1'	Stadium: Falmer Stadium; Attendance: 29,398; Referee: Michael Oliver

21 September 2019 6	Newcastle United	0–0	Brighton & Hove Albion	Newcastle upon Tyne
17:30 BST	Manquillo (yellow card) 44'; Atsu (yellow card) 79'	Report	Dunk (yellow card) 88'	Stadium: St James' Park; Attendance: 43,316; Referee: Martin Atkinson
Note: Live on Sky Sports

28 September 2019 7	Chelsea	2–0	Brighton & Hove Albion	London
15:00 BST	Christensen (yellow card) 23'; Alonso (yellow card) 31'; Jorginho 50' (pen.); Willian 76'	Report	Maupay (yellow card) 28'; Alzate (yellow card) 33'; Webster (yellow card) 49'	Stadium: Stamford Bridge; Attendance: 40,683; Referee: Chris Kavanagh

5 October 2019 8	Brighton & Hove Albion	3–0	Tottenham Hotspur	Falmer
12:30 BST	Maupay 3'; Connolly 32', 65'; Stephens (yellow card) 57'; Dunk (yellow card) 89'	Report	Dier (yellow card) 55'	Stadium: Falmer Stadium; Attendance: 30,160; Referee: Jon Moss

19 October 2019 9	Aston Villa	2–1	Brighton & Hove Albion	Aston
15:00 BST	Hourihane (yellow card) 19'; Grealish 45+2'; Targett 90+4'	Report	Webster 21'; Mooy (yellow card) 30' (yellow-red card) 35'; Montoya (yellow card) 53'; March (yellow card) 87'	Stadium: Villa Park; Attendance: 41,826; Referee: David Coote

26 October 2019 10	Brighton & Hove Albion	3–2	Everton	Falmer
15:00 BST	Groß 15'; Stephens (yellow card) 33'; Maupay 80' (pen.); Pröpper (yellow card) 90+3'; Digne 90+4' (o.g.)	Report	Webster 20' (o.g.); Calvert-Lewin 74'; Holgate (yellow card) 86'	Stadium: Falmer Stadium; Attendance: 30,529; Referee: Andrew Madley

2 November 2019 11	Brighton & Hove Albion	2–0	Norwich City	Falmer
15:00 GMT	Trossard 68'; Duffy 84'	Report	Stiepermann (yellow card) 63'	Stadium: Falmer Stadium; Attendance: 30,539; Referee: Kevin Friend

10 November 2019 12	Manchester United	3–1	Brighton & Hove Albion	Manchester
14:00 GMT	Pereira 17'; Pröpper 19' (o.g.); Rashford (yellow card) 45', (goal) 66'; Williams (yellow card) 58'	Report	Stephens (yellow card) 5'; Dunk (yellow card) 19', (goal) 64'; Montoya (yellow card) 30'; Burn (yellow card) 45+2'; Pröpper (yellow card) 74'	Stadium: Old Trafford; Attendance: 73,556; Referee: Jon Moss

23 November 2019 13	Brighton & Hove Albion	0–2	Leicester City	Falmer
15:00 GMT	Webster (yellow card) 16'; Stephens (yellow card) 48'	Report	Pérez 64'; Vardy 82' (pen.)	Stadium: Falmer Stadium; Attendance: 30,640; Referee: Mike Dean

30 November 2019 14	Liverpool	2–1	Brighton & Hove Albion	Liverpool
15:00 GMT	Van Dijk 18', 24'; Alisson (red card) 76'	Report	Dunk 79'	Stadium: Anfield; Attendance: 53,319; Referee: Martin Atkinson

5 December 2019 15	Arsenal	1–2	Brighton & Hove Albion	Holloway
20:15 GMT	Bellerín (yellow card) 20'; Sokratis (yellow card) 45+1'; Lacazette 50'; Luiz (yellow card) 68'	Report	Webster 36'; Groß (yellow card) 60'; Maupay 80'	Stadium: Emirates Stadium; Attendance: 60,164; Referee: Graham Scott

8 December 2019 16	Brighton & Hove Albion	2–2	Wolverhampton Wanderers	Falmer
16:30 GMT	Maupay 34'; Pröpper 36'; Dunk (yellow card) 75'; Burn (yellow card) 82'; Stephens (yellow card) 90+2'	Report	Jota 28', 44'	Stadium: Falmer Stadium; Attendance: 30,189; Referee: Jon Moss

16 December 2019 17	Crystal Palace	1–1	Brighton & Hove Albion	Selhurst
19:45 GMT	Benteke (yellow card) 35'; Zaha 76'	Report	Maupay 54'; Pröpper (yellow card) 86'	Stadium: Selhurst Park; Attendance: 24,175; Referee: Craig Pawson

21 December 2019 18	Brighton & Hove Albion	0–1	Sheffield United	Falmer
15:00 GMT	Bissouma (yellow card) 87'	Report	McBurnie 23'; Stevens (yellow card) 75'; Basham (yellow card) 83'; McGoldrick (yellow card) 85'	Stadium: Falmer Stadium; Attendance: 30,505; Referee: Robert Jones

26 December 2019 19	Tottenham Hotspur	2–1	Brighton & Hove Albion	Tottenham
12:30 GMT	Winks (yellow card) 36'; Sánchez (yellow card) 39'; Kane 53'; Alli 72'; Lucas Moura (yellow card) 74'; Sissoko (yellow card) 84'	Report	Burn (yellow card) 30'; Webster 37'; Groß (yellow card) 42'	Stadium: Tottenham Hotspur Stadium; Attendance: 56,308; Referee: Graham Scott

28 December 2019 20	Brighton & Hove Albion	2–0	Bournemouth	Falmer
12:30 GMT	Jahanbakhsh 3'; Mooy 79'	Report	Cook (yellow card) 22'; Billing (yellow card) 67'	Stadium: Falmer Stadium; Attendance: 30,441; Referee: Paul Tierney

1 January 2020 21	Brighton & Hove Albion	1–1	Chelsea	Falmer
12:30 GMT	Dunk (yellow card) 71'; Jahanbakhsh 84'; Maupay (yellow card) 90+1'	Report	Azpilicueta 10'; Zouma (yellow card) 69'; Kovačić (yellow card) 82'	Stadium: Falmer Stadium; Attendance: 30,559; Referee: Stuart Attwell

11 January 2020 22	Everton	1–0	Brighton & Hove Albion	Liverpool
15:00 GMT	Richarlison 38'; Calvert-Lewin (yellow card) 78'; Pickford (yellow card) 90+4'	Report	Duffy (yellow card) 79'	Stadium: Goodison Park; Attendance: 38,772; Referee: David Coote

18 January 2020 23	Brighton & Hove Albion	1–1	Aston Villa	Falmer
15:00 GMT	Trossard 38'; Dunk (yellow card) 43'; Webster (yellow card) 90+1'; Maupay (yellow card) 90+5'	Report	Drinkwater (yellow card) 14'; Grealish 75'; Nakamba (yellow card) 81'; Hourihane (yellow card) 90+5'	Stadium: Falmer Stadium; Attendance: 30,551; Referee: Andrew Madley

21 January 2020 24	Bournemouth	3–1	Brighton & Hove Albion	Bournemouth
19:30 GMT	H. Wilson 36'; Groß 41' (o.g.); C. Wilson 74'; Lerma (yellow card) 90+1'	Report	Bernardo (yellow card) 28'; Mooy 81'	Stadium: Vitality Stadium; Attendance: 10,065; Referee: Kevin Friend

1 February 2020 25	West Ham United	3–3	Brighton & Hove Albion	Stratford
15:00 GMT	Diop 30'; Snodgrass 45', 57'; Ogbonna (yellow card) 90'	Report	Ogbonna 47' (o.g.); Stephens (yellow card) 52'; Groß 75'; Murray 79'	Stadium: London Stadium; Attendance: 59,952; Referee: Michael Oliver

8 February 2020 26	Brighton & Hove Albion	1–1	Watford	Falmer
17:30 GMT	Schelotto (yellow card) 35'; Mariappa 78' (o.g.); March (yellow card) 90+3'	Report	Doucouré 19'; Hughes (yellow card) 64'; Mariappa (yellow card) 65'	Stadium: Falmer Stadium; Attendance: 30,443; Referee: Kevin Friend

22 February 2020 27	Sheffield United	1–1	Brighton & Hove Albion	Sheffield
15:00 GMT	Stevens 26'	Report	Bissouma (yellow card) 10'; Pröpper (yellow card) 23'; Maupay 30'	Stadium: Bramall Lane; Attendance: 31,888; Referee: Graham Scott

29 February 2020 28	Brighton & Hove Albion	0–1	Crystal Palace	Falmer
12:30 GMT	Schelotto (yellow card) 27'; Montoya (yellow card) 57'	Report	Benteke (yellow card) 33'; Ayew 70'	Stadium: Falmer Stadium; Attendance: 30,124; Referee: Martin Atkinson

7 March 2020 29	Wolverhampton Wanderers	0–0	Brighton & Hove Albion	Wolverhampton
15:00 GMT	Saïss (yellow card) 45+1'	Report	Montoya (yellow card) 37'; Burn (yellow card) 54'; Dunk (yellow card) 54'	Stadium: Molineux; Attendance: 31,490; Referee: Andre Marriner

20 June 2020 30	Brighton & Hove Albion	2–1	Arsenal	Falmer
15:00 BST	Burn (yellow card) 30'; Mooy (yellow card) 44'; Dunk 75'; Maupay 90+5'	Report	Lacazette (yellow card) 54'; Pépé 68'	Stadium: Falmer Stadium; Attendance: 0 Referee: Martin Atkinson
Note: Match originally scheduled for 14 March, but postponed after it was revealed Arsenal manager Mikel Arteta tested positive for COVID-19 on 12 March. It was rescheduled to 20 June.

23 June 2020 31	Leicester City	0–0	Brighton & Hove Albion	Leicester
18:00 BST	Justin (yellow card) 12'; Ndidi (yellow card) 34'	Report	Stephens (yellow card) 36'; Duffy (yellow card) 80'	Stadium: King Power Stadium; Attendance: 0 Referee: Lee Mason
Note: The match was postponed on 13 March due to concerns over the COVID-19 pandemic, and rescheduled to 23 June.

30 June 2020 32	Brighton & Hove Albion	0–3	Manchester United	Falmer
20:15 BST		Report	Greenwood 16'; Fernandes 29', 50'; Shaw (yellow card) 49'	Stadium: Falmer Stadium; Attendance: 0 Referee: Andre Marriner
Note: The match was postponed on 19 March due to concerns over the COVID-19 pandemic. It was rescheduled to 30 June.

4 July 2020 33	Norwich City	0–1	Brighton & Hove Albion	Norwich
12:30 BST	Lewis (yellow card) 38'; Cantwell (yellow card) 90+1'	Report	Trossard 25'; Lamptey (yellow card) 88'; Groß (yellow card) 89'	Stadium: Carrow Road; Attendance: 0 Referee: Stuart Attwell
Note: The match was postponed on 19 March due to concerns over the COVID-19 pandemic. It was rescheduled to 4 July.

8 July 2020 34	Brighton & Hove Albion	1–3	Liverpool	Falmer
20:15 BST	Trossard 45'; Lamptey (yellow card) 85'	Report	Salah 6', 76'; Henderson 8'; Williams (yellow card) 41'; Mané (yellow card) 63'; Fabinho (yellow card) 78'; Gomez (yellow card) 89'	Stadium: Falmer Stadium; Attendance: 0 Referee: Craig Pawson
Note: The match was postponed on 3 April due to concerns over the COVID-19 pandemic. It was rescheduled to 8 July.

11 July 2020 35	Brighton & Hove Albion	0–5	Manchester City	Falmer
20:00 BST	Bissouma (yellow card) 83'	Report	Sterling 21', 53', 81'; Jesus 44'; B. Silva 56'	Stadium: Falmer Stadium; Attendance: 0 Referee: Graham Scott
Note: The match was postponed on 3 April due to concerns over the COVID-19 pandemic. It was rescheduled to 11 July.

16 July 2020 36	Southampton	1–1	Brighton & Hove Albion	Southampton
20:15 BST	Romeu (yellow card) 7'; Ings 66'	Report	Maupay 17'	Stadium: St Mary's Stadium; Attendance: 0 Referee: Andre Marriner
Note: The match was postponed on 3 April due to concerns over the COVID-19 pandemic. It was rescheduled to 16 July.

20 July 2020 37	Brighton & Hove Albion	0–0	Newcastle United	Falmer
18:00 BST	Bissouma (yellow card) 23'; Groß (yellow card) 26'; Stephens (yellow card) 46'; Webster (yellow card) 87'	Report	Ritchie (yellow card) 31'; Rose (yellow card) 63'	Stadium: Falmer Stadium; Attendance: 0 Referee: Simon Hooper
Note: The match was postponed on 3 April due to concerns over the COVID-19 pandemic. It was rescheduled to 20 July.

26 July 2020 38	Burnley	1–2	Brighton & Hove Albion	Burnley
16:00 BST	Brownhill (yellow card) 5'; Wood 44'; Bardsley (yellow card) 85'; Pieters (yellow card) 90+4'	Report	Bissouma 20'; Connolly 50'	Stadium: Turf Moor; Attendance: 0 Referee: Jon Moss
Note: The match was postponed on 3 April due to concerns over the COVID-19 pandemic. It was rescheduled to 26 July.

=== FA Cup ===
The third round draw was made live on BBC Two from Etihad Stadium, Micah Richards and Tony Adams conducted the draw.

4 January 2020 Third round	Brighton & Hove Albion	0–1	Sheffield Wednesday	Falmer
15:00 GMT		Report	Reach 65'	Stadium: Falmer Stadium; Attendance: 20,349; Referee: Andre Marriner

=== EFL Cup ===
27 August 2019 Second round	Bristol Rovers	1–2	Brighton & Hove Albion	Horfield
19:45 BST	Nichols 64'	Report	Connolly 55' (yellow card) 72'; Murray 90+2'	Stadium: Memorial Stadium; Attendance: 5,864; Referee: Matt Donohue

25 September 2019 Third round	Brighton & Hove Albion	1–3	Aston Villa	Falmer
19:45 BST	Roberts 61' (yellow card) 90+2'; Richards (yellow card) 79'	Report	Jota 22'; Hourihane 33'; Grealish 77'; Konsa (yellow card) 85'	Stadium: Falmer Stadium; Attendance: 14,982; Referee: Graham Scott

== Squad statistics ==
No.	Pos	Nat	Player	Total		Premier League		EFL Cup		FA Cup	
No.	Pos	Nat	Player	Apps	Goals	Apps	Goals	Apps	Goals	Apps	Goals
Goalkeepers
1	GK	(Australia) AUS	Mathew Ryan	38	0	38	0	0	0	0	0
23	GK	(England) ENG	Jason Steele	0	0	0	0	0	0	0	0
27	GK	(England) ENG	David Button	3	0	0	0	2	0	1	0
Defenders
2	DF	(England) ENG	Tariq Lamptey	8	0	7+1	0	0	0	0	0
4	DF	(Republic of Ireland) IRL	Shane Duffy	22	1	12+8	1	1	0	1	0
5	DF	(England) ENG	Lewis Dunk	36	3	36	3	0	0	0	0
15	DF	(England) ENG	Adam Webster	33	3	31	3	1	0	1	0
21	DF	(Italy) ITA	Ezequiel Schelotto	10	0	5+4	0	0	0	1	0
22	DF	(Spain) ESP	Martín Montoya	27	0	23+4	0	0	0	0	0
30	DF	(Brazil) BRA	Bernardo	16	0	7+7	0	1	0	0+1	0
33	DF	(England) ENG	Dan Burn	34	0	33+1	0	0	0	0	0
49	DF	(France) FRA	Romaric Yapi	1	0	0	0	0+1	0	0	0
51	DF	(England) ENG	Archie Davies	1	0	0	0	1	0	0	0
58	DF	(England) ENG	Haydon Roberts	1	1	0	0	1	1	0	0
Midfielders
6	MF	(England) ENG	Dale Stephens	34	0	28+5	0	0	0	1	0
8	MF	(Mali) MLI	Yves Bissouma	23	1	14+8	1	0	0	1	0
10	MF	(Argentina) ARG	Alexis Mac Allister	9	0	3+6	0	0	0	0	0
11	MF	(Belgium) BEL	Leandro Trossard	31	5	22+9	5	0	0	0	0
13	MF	(Germany) GER	Pascal Groß	31	2	22+7	2	1	0	1	0
18	MF	(Australia) AUS	Aaron Mooy	32	2	25+6	2	1	0	0	0
20	MF	(England) ENG	Solly March	19	0	11+8	0	0	0	0	0
24	MF	(Netherlands) NED	Davy Pröpper	35	1	33+2	1	0	0	0	0
45	MF	(England) ENG	Taylor Richards	1	0	0	0	1	0	0	0
46	MF	(Colombia) COL	Steven Alzate	21	0	12+7	0	1	0	1	0
50	MF	(England) ENG	Alex Cochrane	1	0	0	0	1	0	0	0
55	MF	(Sweden) SWE	Peter Gwargis	1	0	0	0	1	0	0	0
60	MF	(England) ENG	Ryan Longman	1	0	0	0	0+1	0	0	0
71	MF	(England) ENG	Jack Spong	1	0	0	0	0+1	0	0	0
72	MF	(England) ENG	Teddy Jenks	1	0	0	0	1	0	0	0
Forwards
7	FW	(France) FRA	Neal Maupay	38	10	30+7	10	0	0	1	0
16	FW	(Iran) IRN	Alireza Jahanbakhsh	12	2	3+7	2	1	0	0+1	0
17	FW	(England) ENG	Glenn Murray	24	2	7+16	1	1	1	0	0
19	FW	(Colombia) COL	Jose Izquierdo	0	0	0	0	0	0	0	0
44	FW	(Republic of Ireland) IRL	Aaron Connolly	27	4	14+10	3	2	1	0+1	0
Players who left the club permanently or on loan during the season
3	DF	(Cameroon) CMR	Gaëtan Bong	7	0	0+4	0	2	0	1	0
9	FW	(Netherlands) NED	Jürgen Locadia	2	0	1+1	0	0	0	0	0
10	FW	(Romania) ROU	Florin Andone	3	1	1+2	1	0	0	0	0
14	DF	(Nigeria) NGA	Leon Balogun	2	0	0	0	1	0	1	0
28	MF	(Romania) ROU	Tudor Băluță	1	0	0	0	1	0	0	0
