= Leandro Trossard =

Belgian footballer (born 1994)

- Trossard with Belgium in 2026

Personal information
- Full name: Leandro Trossard
- Date of birth: 4 December 1994 (age 31)
- Place of birth: Maasmechelen, Belgium
- Height: 1.72 m (5 ft 8 in)
- Positions: Left winger; forward

Team information
- Current team: Beşiktaş
- Number: 19

Youth career
- 2005–2008: Patro Eisden
- 2008–2010: Bocholter VV
- 2010–2012: Genk

Senior career*
Years	Team	Apps	(Gls)
2012–2019	Genk	83	(27)
2012–2013	→ Lommel United (loan)	12	(7)
2013–2014	→ Westerlo (loan)	17	(3)
2014–2015	→ Lommel United (loan)	30	(16)
2015–2016	→ OH Leuven (loan)	30	(8)
2019–2023	Brighton & Hove Albion	116	(25)
2023–2026	Arsenal	123	(27)
2026–	Beşiktaş	11	(3)

International career^{‡}
2010	Belgium U16	5	(0)
2010–2011	Belgium U17	11	(0)
2011–2012	Belgium U18	3	(0)
2012–2013	Belgium U19	8	(0)
2016	Belgium U21	1	(0)
2020–	Belgium	61	(14)
- * Club domestic league appearances and goals as of 22:16, 22 November 2026 (UTC) ‡ National team caps and goals as of 22:55, 15 November 2026 (UTC)

Leandro Trossard (Dutch pronunciation: [leːˈɑndroː ˈtrɔsɑrt], French pronunciation: [tʁɔ.saʁ]; born 4 December 1994) is a Belgian professional footballer who plays as a forward or left winger for Süper Lig club Beşiktaş and the Belgium national team.

Trossard began his professional career in Belgium with Genk, scoring 39 goals, before embarking on four consecutive loans between 2012 and 2016. He joined Premier League club Brighton & Hove Albion in 2019, and joined Arsenal in 2023 for a reported fee of £27 million (including add-ons), where he won the Premier League. He joined Beşiktaş in 2026 for an initial fee of £15.4 million.

Trossard has represented Belgium since joining the under-16 side in 2010. He was named in the senior squads for the UEFA European Championship in 2020 and 2024, as well as the FIFA World Cup in 2022 and 2026.

== Early life ==
Trossard was born in Maasmechelen, Limburg, to Peter Trossard and Linda Scheepers on 4 December 1994. He has one younger sister.

== Club career ==
=== Genk ===
Trossard joined the Genk youth academy from the Bocholter VV academy in 2010. He was promoted to the senior squad in 2012, making his first, albeit brief, appearance on 13 May 2012 in a league match against Gent. The game ended 3–1 in favour of Gent. Trossard was introduced in the 87th minute, replacing Stef Peeters. Those three minutes were the only ones he played in the league that season. For several seasons, he was consistently sent out on loan. As a result, he didn't score his first league goal for Genk until over four years later, coming in a 4–1 away loss to K.V. Kortrijk on 25 September 2016. He was brought on as a substitute for Leon Bailey and scored in the 63rd minute, assisted by Bryan Heynen.

In January 2013, Trossard was sent out on loan to Lommel United. In twelve league appearances, he scored seven goals. His debut for Lommel came on 3 February 2013 in a 1–0 away loss to Sint-Truiden. He was introduced as a substitute in the 63rd minute, coming on for Thomas Jutten. Arguably, the greatest game during his loan spell was his hat-trick in a 3–2 home victory over Dessel Sport, in front of 2000 fans at the Soevereinstadion. He scored one in the 11th minute, another in the 60th (from the penalty spot), and the last in the 74th. He was subbed off in the 88th minute.

In July 2013, Trossard was loaned out to Westerlo. In 17 league appearances, he scored three goals. The first of these goals came on 9 August 2013 in a 2–0 away win over his former club Lommel United. He scored in the 74th minute. He made his debut on 3 August 2013 in a 2–2 home draw with RUTB. This was also his first start for the club. Trossard helped Westerlo to promotion to Belgian Pro League.

In July 2014, Trossard was loaned out to Lommel United again. He continued his goal scoring form, finding the net 16 times in 33 league matches. He scored his second career hat-trick for Lommel on 22 March 2015 in a 6–0 demolition of Racing Mechelen. His goals came in the 33rd, 61st and 69th minutes. That season, Lommel were only nine points off promotion back to the top flight.

In July 2015, Trossard was loaned out again, this time to OH Leuven. In 30 league matches, he scored eight goals. He made his Leuven debut on 25 July 2015 in a 3–1 away loss to the club he had been loaned out from in Genk. Genk didn't enforce the rule of not allowing loanees to play against them, as he was brought off the bench in the 61st minute, replacing Yohan Croizet. His first league goal for Leuven came on 16 August 2015 in a 2–0 victory over Charleroi. He made an immediate impact off the bench. He was brought on for Yohan Croizet in the 82nd minute, and scored in the 85th.

=== Brighton and Hove Albion ===
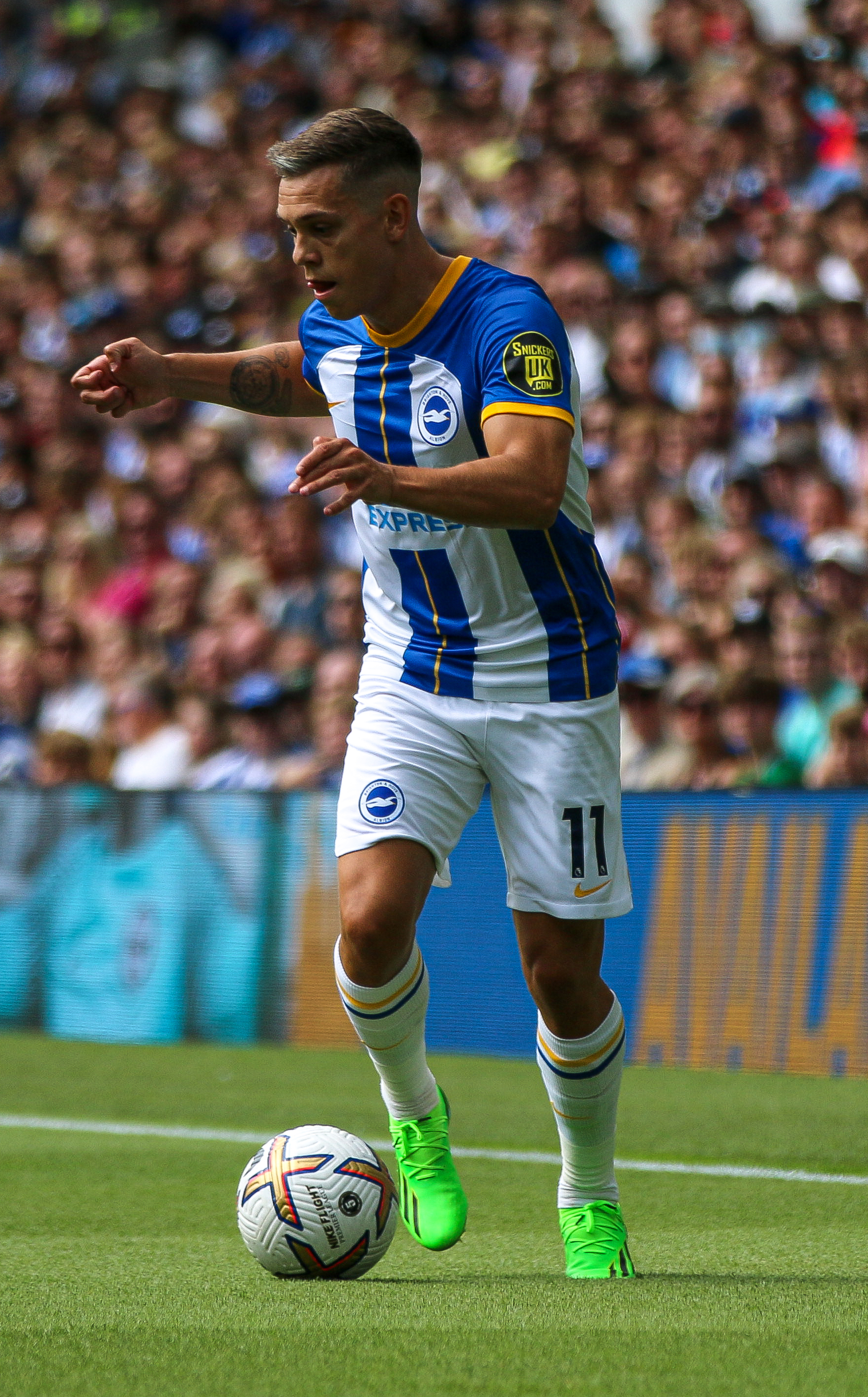
Trossard playing for Brighton & Hove Albion in 2022

On 26 June 2019, Brighton & Hove Albion agreed to sign Trossard, who joined on a four-year deal with an option for an extra year, becoming the club's second signing of the summer, following Matt Clarke's arrival from Portsmouth. Trossard made his debut on 17 August where he scored the equaliser in the 1–1 home draw against West Ham United. Earlier in the game he was denied a goal for offside by VAR. Trossard scored twice against Norwich in the 2019–20 season, one in the 2–0 home victory on 2 November 2019, and again in a crucial 1–0 away win on 4 July 2020 to help Brighton push further away from the bottom three.

On 31 January 2021, Trossard scored the only goal in a 1–0 home win over Tottenham Hotspur to secure the Seagulls' first home league win of the 2020–21 season. Trossard played in Brighton's 1–0 away victory over defending champions Liverpool on 3 February claiming their first league win at Anfield since 1982, where he deflected Steven Alzate's shot back onto Alzate, being awarded the assist in the only goal of the game. On 14 March 2021, Trossard scored the winner in a 2–1 away win over Southampton, sealing Brighton's first win over the Saints in Premier League history. Trossard scored the first goal of Brighton's comeback from 2–0 down to beat champions Manchester City 3–2 on 18 May, with fans returning to football.

Trossard scored his first goal of the 2021–22 season on 11 September, firing in a 90th-minute winner scoring the only goal of the game in the 1–0 away win over Premier League newcomers Brentford. He conceded a penalty by barging into Conor Gallagher away at Crystal Palace in the first derby game of the season on 27 September, where Wilfried Zaha converted the spot kick to take Palace 1–0 up at the break. However, Neal Maupay scored a 95th-minute equaliser to take a point back to the south coast. Trossard scored Brighton's equaliser away at Liverpool on 30 October, completing a stirring fightback, coming from 2–0 down to earn a 2–2 draw. He enjoyed his time in North London in April 2022 by scoring two goals in two games against Arsenal and Tottenham. Opening the scoreline in the 2–1 victory at Arsenal on the 9th and scoring a 90th-minute winner at the Tottenham Hotspur Stadium on his 100th Albion appearance, seven days later. This was his sixth goal of the season, making it his best scoring season since joining the Sussex club. On 7 May, Trossard assisted two goals and scored one with his chest which had to be reviewed by VAR for potential handball in the 4–0 home thrashing of Manchester United.

Trossard scored his first goal of the 2022–23 season adding Brighton's second in the 2–0 away win at West Ham on 21 August, helping maintain their unbeaten run to 11 games against the "Hammers" in the Premier League. He scored his first home goal of the season on 4 September, putting Brighton back ahead in the eventual 5–2 home win over Leicester City. In their next match on 1 October, Trossard became the first Brighton player to score a Premier League hat-trick in the 3–3 away draw at Liverpool. His first half double meant he was the first player to score two first-half goals at Anfield since Wigan Athletic's Amr Zaki in October 2008. Trossard's hat-trick also meant he had scored four goals in two appearances at Anfield. Trossard scored his 100th club career goal on 22 October, pulling one back, in the eventual 3–1 away loss at two-time defending champions Manchester City.

In early January 2023, however, Trossard's relations with the club deteriorated sharply after manager Roberto De Zerbi said he would drop the player for leaving a training session without permission. De Zerbi said he did not like the player's attitude or behaviour. In response, agent Josy Comhair accused De Zerbi of having humiliated the player in front of his teammates, saying a transfer was the best solution.

=== Arsenal ===
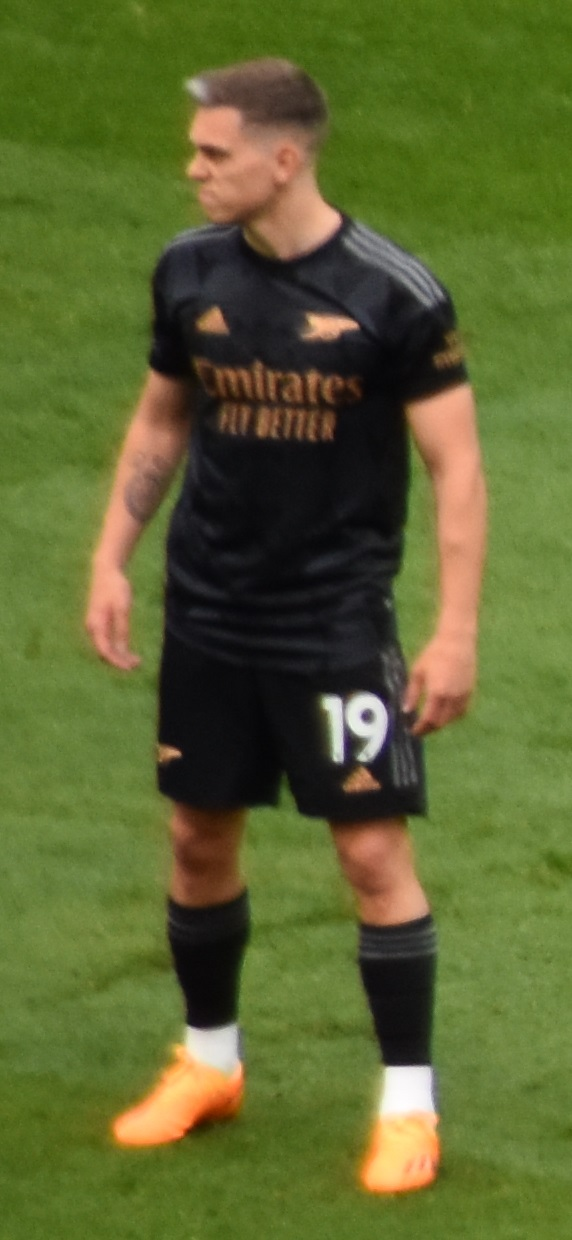
Trossard playing for Arsenal in 2023

On 20 January 2023, Arsenal confirmed the signing of Trossard on a long-term contract. The fee consisted of a guaranteed £20 million, and around a further £7 million in add-ons. He was given the number 19 shirt by the club, and made his debut on 22 January as a substitute in a 3–2 win over Manchester United. He made his full debut on 27 January against Manchester City in the FA Cup fourth round.

On 11 February 2023, Trossard came on as a substitute against Brentford and within four minutes scored his first goal for the club in a 1–1 draw. On 18 February, he was handed his first Premier League start for Arsenal in a 4–2 victory at Villa Park. One week later, Trossard provided his first assist for the club in a 1–0 win at Leicester City. He assisted all three of Arsenal's goals in their win at Fulham on 12 March, becoming the first player in Premier League history to provide a hat-trick of assists in the first half of a game, away from home and the first player since Santi Cazorla to score a hat-trick and also register a hat-trick of assists in the same season. By the end of his first half-season with Arsenal, he had scored one goal and provided 10 assists.

On 6 August 2023, Trossard came off the bench and found the net in the final minutes of stoppage time to make it 1–1 against Manchester City in the 2023 FA Community Shield, forcing a penalty shootout which Arsenal went on to win 4–1. On 17 September, he scored the only goal of the game in a 1–0 away win over Everton, helping to seal Arsenal's first win at Goodison Park since 2017. Three days later on 20 September, he scored his first Champions League goal and provided an assist in a 4–0 win over PSV Eindhoven on his debut in the competition. On 21 October, coming off the bench just after they scored a goal at the 78th minute, Trossard found the net at the 84th minute in a comeback against Chelsea which finished 2–2. On 12 March 2024, Leandro Trossard scored the only goal in a 1–0 second leg win of the Champions League round of 16 tie against Porto, taking the game to extra-time and penalties which Arsenal won 4–2, helping the Gunners progress to the quarter-final of the Champions League for the first time since 2009–10, ending a run of seven consecutive last 16 eliminations in the competition.

On 6 April 2024, Trossard scored against his former club Brighton, scoring the third goal in a 3–0 away win that put Arsenal on top of the Premier League table.

In the summer of 2025, Trossard signed a new contract with Arsenal, despite speculation about a potential departure from the club. Starting the season as an impact substitute, Trossard provided an assist in Arsenal's 3–0 win against Nottingham Forest and scored in the 2–0 Champions League win over Athletic Bilbao. On 23 November, he scored and assisted in a 4–1 North London derby victory against Tottenham Hotspur. On 10 May 2026, Trossard scored the only goal in a crucial 1–0 away victory over West Ham United, a result that proved decisive in Arsenal's eventual Premier League title triumph.

=== Beşiktaş ===
On 14 July 2026, Arsenal announced that they had reached an agreement with Turkish Super Lig side Beşiktaş for Trossard. The fee consisted of an initial £15.3m plus £1.7m in add-ons. Trossard arrived in Istanbul that same day to undergo medical examinations ahead of completing his transfer to Süper Lig club Beşiktaş. The transfer was made official the following day as Trossard signed a permanent three-year contract with an option for another year.

== International career ==
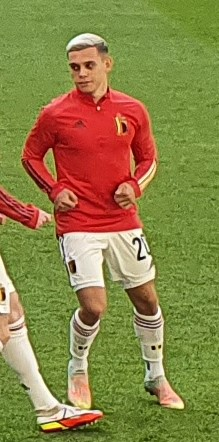
Trossard warming up with Belgium at the 2021 UEFA Nations League Finals

Trossard has been called up to the Belgium national team on multiple occasions. Roberto Martínez first named him in the Belgium squad in September 2018, again one month later when Trossard had to withdraw through injury, Trossard remained on the bench again in March 2019. He made his debut on 5 September 2020 in a Nations League game against Denmark, he substituted Dries Mertens in the 80th minute of the 2–0 away victory. On his first international start, Trossard scored his first goal for his country also adding a second in an 8–0 crushing of Belarus in a 2022 World Cup qualifier on 30 March 2021.

Trossard was named in Belgium's 26-man squad for Euro 2020 on 17 May 2021, with the tournament taking place in the summer of 2021 due to the previous year's postponement as a result of the COVID-19 pandemic. He made his first appearance of the tournament in Belgium's final group match against Finland on 21 June with Belgium already through to the knockouts. Trossard started the match later being replaced by Thomas Meunier in the 75th minute of the 2–0 victory at the Krestovsky Stadium in Saint Petersburg that secured the Belgians top spot of Group B. This turned out to be his only game as Belgium were knocked out by Italy in the quarter-final after a 2–1 defeat at the Allianz Arena in Munich on 2 July.

In October 2021, Trossard was a part of Belgium's squad for the UEFA Nations League Finals in Italy. He made two substitute appearances where Belgium lost to France in the semi-final and losing again to Italy in the third-place match to come fourth.

In an international friendly at home against Burkina Faso on 29 March 2022, Trossard scored his third goal for his country, where he also assisted Hans Vanaken's and Christian Benteke's goals in the 3–0 win. On 8 June, he scored his second international brace in the 6–1 home thrashing over Poland in the UEFA Nations League.

Trossard playing for Belgium at the 2026 FIFA World Cup

On 10 November, Trossard was named in Belgium's 26-man squad for the 2022 FIFA World Cup. He scored his first World Cup goals by netting a brace in a 5–1 victory over New Zealand.

On 15 May 2026, he was named in Belgium's squad for the 2026 FIFA World Cup.

== Personal life ==
Trossard dated and had been in a relationship with Laura Hilven since 2014, getting married in June 2019. They have two sons, born in April 2017 and January 2023. On 11 May 2026, Hilven and Trossard publicly announced their separation. Trossard's native language is Dutch.

== Career statistics ==
=== Club ===
As of match played 8 November 2026

Appearances and goals by club, season and competition
Club	Season	League			National cup (Note: Includes Belgian Cup, FA Cup)		League cup (Note: Includes EFL Cup)		Europe		Other		Total	
Club	Season	Division	Apps	Goals	Apps	Goals	Apps	Goals	Apps	Goals	Apps	Goals	Apps	Goals
Genk	2011–12	Belgian Pro League	1	0	0	0	—		0	0	—		1	0
Genk	2012–13	Belgian Pro League	0	0	1	0	—		0	0	—		1	0
Genk	2016–17	Belgian Pro League	31	6	5	0	—		16 (Note: Appearance(s) in UEFA Europa League)	3	—		52	9
Genk	2017–18	Belgian Pro League	17	7	2	1	—		—		—		19	8
Genk	2018–19	Belgian Pro League	34	14	2	0	—		11	8	—		47	22
Genk	Total		83	27	10	1	—		27	11	—		120	39
Lommel United (loan)	2012–13	Belgian Second Division	12	7	—		—		—		—		12	7
Westerlo (loan)	2013–14	Belgian Second Division	17	3	4	2	—		—		—		21	5
Lommel United (loan)	2014–15	Belgian Second Division	30	16	3	0	—		—		6 (Note: Appearances in Belgian Pro League promotion play-offs)	1	39	17
OH Leuven (loan)	2015–16	Belgian Pro League	30	8	1	0	—		—		—		31	8
Brighton & Hove Albion	2019–20	Premier League	31	5	0	0	0	0	—		—		31	5
Brighton & Hove Albion	2020–21	Premier League	35	5	3	0	1	0	—		—		39	5
Brighton & Hove Albion	2021–22	Premier League	34	8	1	0	0	0	—		—		35	8
Brighton & Hove Albion	2022–23	Premier League	16	7	0	0	1	0	—		—		17	7
Brighton & Hove Albion	Total		116	25	4	0	2	0	—		—		122	25
Arsenal	2022–23	Premier League	20	1	1	0	—		1	0	—		22	1
Arsenal	2023–24	Premier League	34	12	1	0	1	0	9 (Note: Appearances in UEFA Champions League)	4	1 (Note: Appearance in FA Community Shield)	1	46	17
Arsenal	2024–25	Premier League	38	8	1	0	3	0	14	2	—		56	10
Arsenal	2025–26	Premier League	31	6	2	0	6	1	11	1	—		50	8
Arsenal	Total		123	27	5	0	10	1	35	7	1	1	174	36
Beşiktaş	2026–27	Süper Lig	10	2	0	0	—		5	0	—		15	2
Career total			421	115	27	3	12	1	67	18	7	2	534	139

=== International ===
As of match played 15 November 2026

Appearances and goals by national team and year
National team	Year	Apps	Goals
Belgium
Belgium	2020	3	0
Belgium	2021	11	2
Belgium	2022	10	3
Belgium	2023	6	2
Belgium	2024	11	3
Belgium	2025	9	1
Belgium	2026	11	3
Total		61	14

As of match played 26 June 2026
Belgium score listed first, score column indicates score after each Trossard goal.

List of international goals scored by Leandro Trossard
No.	Date	Venue	Cap	Opponent	Score	Result	Competition	Ref.
1	30 March 2021	Den Dreef, Leuven, Belgium	6	Belarus	3–0	8–0	2022 FIFA World Cup qualification	
2	30 March 2021	Den Dreef, Leuven, Belgium	6	Belarus	7–0	8–0	2022 FIFA World Cup qualification	
3	29 March 2022	Constant Vanden Stock Stadium, Brussels, Belgium	15	Burkina Faso	2–0	3–0	Friendly	
4	8 June 2022	King Baudouin Stadium, Brussels, Belgium	17	Poland	3–1	6–1	2022–23 UEFA Nations League A	
5	8 June 2022	King Baudouin Stadium, Brussels, Belgium	17	Poland	4–1	6–1	2022–23 UEFA Nations League A	
6	12 September 2023	King Baudouin Stadium, Brussels, Belgium	28	Estonia	2–0	5–0	UEFA Euro 2024 qualifying	
7	19 November 2023	King Baudouin Stadium, Brussels, Belgium	30	Azerbaijan	5–0	5–0	UEFA Euro 2024 qualifying	
8	5 June 2024	King Baudouin Stadium, Brussels, Belgium	33	Montenegro	2–0	2–0	Friendly	
9	8 June 2024	King Baudouin Stadium, Brussels, Belgium	34	Luxembourg	3–0	3–0	Friendly	
10	10 October 2024	Stadio Olimpico, Rome, Italy	38	Italy	2–2	2–2	2024–25 UEFA Nations League A	
11	13 October 2025	Cardiff City Stadium, Cardiff, Wales	48	Wales	4–2	4–2	2026 FIFA World Cup qualification	
12	6 June 2026	King Baudouin Stadium, Brussels, Belgium	51	Tunisia	1–0	5–0	Friendly	
13	26 June 2026	BC Place, Vancouver, Canada	54	New Zealand	1–0	5–1	2026 FIFA World Cup	
14	26 June 2026	BC Place, Vancouver, Canada	54	New Zealand	2–0	5–1	2026 FIFA World Cup	

== Honours ==
Genk

- Belgian First Division A: 2018–19
- Belgian Cup: 2012–13

Westerlo

- Belgian Second Division: 2013–14

Arsenal

- Premier League: 2025–26
- FA Community Shield: 2023
- EFL Cup runner-up: 2025–26
- UEFA Champions League runner-up: 2025–26

=== Individual ===
- Arsenal Player of the Month: March 2023December 2025
- Belgian Pro League Team of the Season: 2017–18, 2018–19
