= Kun Temenuzhkov =

Bulgarian footballer

Personal information
- Full name: Dzhoshkun Temenuzhkov Mihaylov
- Date of birth: 1 February 2000 (age 26)
- Place of birth: Haskovo, Bulgaria
- Height: 1.79 m (5 ft 10 in)
- Position: Forward

Team information
- Current team: Barbastro
- Number: 17

Youth career
- 2007–2009: Fraga
- 2009–2012: Lleida
- 2012–2014: UE Bordeta
- 2014–2017: Barcelona
- 2017–2020: Leeds United

Senior career*
Years	Team	Apps	(Gls)
2019–2022	Leeds United	0	(0)
2019–2020	→ La Nucía (loan)	2	(0)
2020–2022	→ Real Unión (loan)	44	(6)
2022–2023	Navalcarnero	33	(8)
2023	Zamora	8	(1)
2024	Lincoln Red Imps	13	(6)
2024–2025	Moscardó	28	(7)
2025–	Barbastro	26	(11)

International career
2016	Bulgaria U16	3	(1)
2016–2017	Bulgaria U17	4	(2)
2017–2018	Bulgaria U18	2	(0)
2018–2019	Bulgaria U19	2	(0)
2019–2022	Bulgaria U21	4	(0)
- * Club domestic league appearances and goals as of 06:51, 12 May 2025 (UTC)

Dzhoshkun Temenuzhkov Mihaylov (Bulgarian: Джошкун Теменужков Михайлов; born 1 February 2000), known simply as Kun Temenuzhkov (Bulgarian: Кун Теменужков) is a Bulgarian professional footballer who plays as a striker for Spanish club Barbastro.

== Club career ==
=== Youth career ===
Born in Haskovo, Temenuzhkov emigrated to Fraga, Spain, with his parents and four elder siblings at the age of a year and half. He started his youth career in local teams, before joining Barcelona in 2014 after being recommended by former Spain international Guillermo Amor.

In 2017, Temenuzhkov featured in The Guardian's '60 of the best young talents in world football' list, with him likened to footballer Luis Suárez.

=== Leeds United ===
He joined English side Leeds United's academy in July 2017.

Temenuzhkov featured regularly for Carlos Corberán's Leeds United under-23 side over the course of the 2018–19 season, showing his versatility by playing as a striker and in attacking midfield, that won the PDL Northern League 2018–19 Season by winning the league, they then became the national Professional Development League Champions by beating Birmingham City in the final.

He made his professional first team debut on 6 January 2019 during a 2–1 defeat to Queens Park Rangers in the third round of the FA Cup, as a 79th-minute substitute for Tom Pearce.

On 24 September 2019 Kun, together with four other Leeds U23 players, signed contract extensions.

==== Loan moves ====
On 30 January 2020 Kun joined La Nucía on loan until the end of the 2019–20 season. However the Spanish professional football season was paused in March 2020 due to the impact of COVID-19.

On 5 August 2020, after Leeds' promotion to the Premier League, Kun joined Spanish Segunda División B – Group 2 side Real Unión on loan until the end of the 2020–21 season. He ended the season with three goals in 19 league matches and on 21 May 2021 he confirmed he would return to Leeds and fight for his place in the team. In June 2021, he extended his loan at Real Unión for the duration of the 2021–22 season.

=== CDA Navalcarnero ===
In August 2022 Leeds United confirmed that Kun was released by mutual consent and he had joined Spanish fourth tier side CDA Navalcarnero. After a stint with Zamora, he joined Gibraltar Football League side Lincoln Red Imps in January 2024.

== International career ==
=== Background ===
Temenuzhkov is eligible to represent his country of birth, Bulgaria and Spain, the country he has lived in since his childhood years.

=== Bulgaria youth team ===
Temenuzhkov has represented Bulgaria on all youth levels. In an interview for TF Methods on 16 May 2019 Kun announced that he had been called up to the Bulgaria U21 for the training camp in Kyiv and that his only desire is to play for Bulgaria at international level. He made his debut for the team on 3 June 2019 in a 1–1 draw against Israel U21.

== Career statistics ==
=== Club ===
As of match played 26 March 2021

Appearances and goals by club, season and competition
Club	Season	League			National Cup		League Cup		Europe		Other		Total	
Club	Season	Division	Apps	Goals	Apps	Goals	Apps	Goals	Apps	Goals	Apps	Goals	Apps	Goals
Leeds United	2018–19	Championship	0	0	1	0	0	0	–		0	0	1	0
Leeds United	2019–20	Championship	0	0	0	0	0	0	–		0	0	0	0
Leeds United	Total		0	0	1	0	0	0	0	0	0	0	1	0
La Nucía (loan)	2019–20	Segunda División B	2	0	0	0	–		–		0	0	2	0
Real Unión (loan)	2020–21	Segunda División B	15	3	0	0	–		–		0	0	15	3
Real Unión (loan)	2021–22	Primera Division R.F.E.F	7	1	0	0	–		–		0	0	6	0
Career total			24	4	1	0	0	0	0	0	0	0	24	3
