= Sebastian Aigner =

Austrian footballer (born 2001)

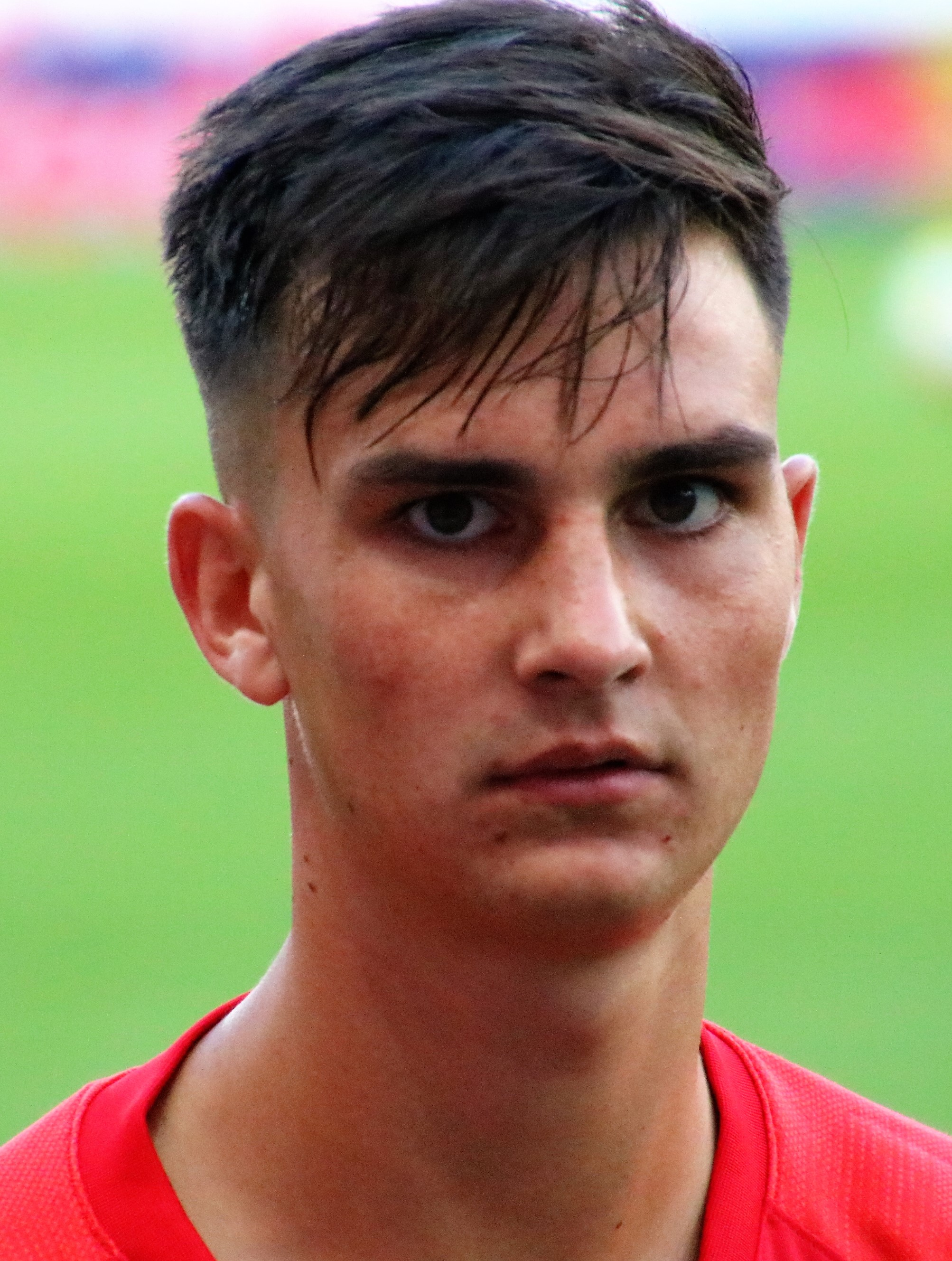
- Aigner in 2019

Personal information
- Date of birth: 3 January 2001 (age 25)
- Place of birth: Austria
- Height: 1.80 m (5 ft 11 in)
- Position: Centre-back

Team information
- Current team: Carl Zeiss Jena
- Number: 14

Youth career
- 2009–2019: Red Bull Salzburg

Senior career*
Years	Team	Apps	(Gls)
2018–2021	Liefering	35	(4)
2021–2024	Rheindorf Altach	39	(0)
2022–2024	Rheindorf Altach II	4	(0)
2024	Schwarz-Weiß Bregenz	13	(0)
2024–2026	SV Austria Salzburg	35	(1)
2026–	Carl Zeiss Jena	2	(0)

International career^{‡}
2015–2016	Austria U15	9	(0)
2017	Austria U17	1	(0)
2019	Austria U18	1	(0)
2019–2020	Austria U19	7	(0)
- * Club domestic league appearances and goals as of 23 September 2026 ‡ National team caps and goals as of 4 September 2020

Sebastian Aigner (born 3 January 2001) is an Austrian professional footballer who plays as a centre back for German Regionalliga Nordost club Carl Zeiss Jena.

== Club career ==
On 11 June 2021, he joined Rheindorf Altach on a three-year contract.

On 6 February 2024, Aigner signed with Schwarz-Weiß Bregenz.

== Honours ==
Red Bull Salzburg Youth

- Jugendliga U18: 2019

FC Liefering

Runner-up

- Austrian Football First League: 2021
