= 2010–11 Brighton & Hove Albion F.C. season =

109th season in existence of Brighton & Hove Albion

Brighton & Hove Albion F.C.
2010–11 season
- Chairman: Tony Bloom
- Manager: Gus Poyet
- Stadium: Withdean Stadium
- League One: Champions
- FA Cup: Fifth round
- League Cup: First round
- League Trophy: First round
- Top goalscorer: League: Glenn Murray (22); All: Glenn Murray (22)
- Highest home attendance: 8,416 (30 April 2011 vs Huddersfield Town, League One)
- Lowest home attendance: 6,474 (28 August 2010 vs Walsall, League One)
- Average home league attendance: 7,351
Home colours	Away colours

The 2010–11 season was Brighton & Hove Albion's fourth consecutive season in the League One. It was their last season at the Withdean Stadium before moving to Falmer Stadium. Brighton won League One in this season, gaining promotion to the Football League Championship for the 2011–12 season.

== Key dates ==
2010

- 7.5.10: Swansea defender Marcos Painter agrees to a two-year pre-contract which he later signs.
- 11.6.10: Albion sign goalkeeper Michael Poke from fellow League One side Southampton.
- 28.6.10: Argentinean Club Comunicaciones players Agustín Battipiedi and Cristian Baz both sign one-year contracts.
- 29.6.10: After spending over a decade at Scunthorpe United Midfielder Matt Sparrow signs a three-year contract.
- 8.7.10: Albion acquires young gun Ashley Barnes from Plymouth Argyle with the striker signing a two-year contract.
- 11.7.10: Speculation is ended when it is announced Gordon Greer is transferring from Swindon Town to take up a three-year contract with the seagulls.
- 16.7.10: Brighton sign former Bulgarian international Radostin Kishishev on a one-year deal.

2011

- 28.1.11: Chairman Tony Bloom confirms that Elliott Bennett has submitted a transfer request. He told seagulls.co.uk "Nothing has changed. We do not want to sell Elliott, we don't need to sell the player."
- 12.4.11: Promotion to Championship secured with 4–3 win over Dagenham & Redbridge.

== League table ==
Pos	Team	Pld	W	D	L	GF	GA	GD	Pts	Promotion, qualification or relegation
1	Brighton & Hove Albion (C, P)	46	28	11	7	85	40	+45	95	Promotion to Football League Championship
2	Southampton (P)	46	28	8	10	86	38	+48	92	Promotion to Football League Championship
3	Huddersfield Town	46	25	12	9	77	48	+29	87	Qualification for League One play-offs
4	Peterborough United (O, P)	46	23	10	13	106	75	+31	79	Qualification for League One play-offs
5	Milton Keynes Dons	46	23	8	15	67	60	+7	77	Qualification for League One play-offs

Updated to match(es) played on 2 May 2011. Source: BBC
Rules for classification: 1) points; 2) goal difference; 3) number of goals scored.
(C) Champions; (O) Play-off winners; (P) Promoted

== First team ==
As of 29 January 2011.

No.	Name	Position	Date of birth (age)	Previous club	Notes
Goalkeepers
1	Peter Brezovan	GK	9 December 1979 (age 46)	Swindon Town	
13	Mitch Walker	GK	24 September 1991 (age 35)	Youth team graduate	
16	Casper Ankergren	GK	9 November 1979 (age 47)	Leeds United	
19	Michael Poke	GK	21 November 1985 (age 40)	Southampton	
Defenders
3	Gordon Greer	CB	14 December 1980 (age 45)	Swindon Town	Club captain
4	Tommy Elphick	CB	7 September 1987 (age 39)	Youth team graduate	
6	Adam El-Abd	CB	11 September 1984 (age 42)	Youth team graduate	
14	Iñigo Calderón	RB	4 January 1982 (age 44)	Deportivo Alavés	
22	Marcos Painter	LB	17 August 1986 (age 40)	Swansea City	
27	Mauricio Taricco	LB	10 March 1973 (age 53)	A.S. Villasimius	Assistant manager
30	Steve Cook	CB/RB	19 April 1991 (age 35)	Youth team graduate	
33	Jimmy McNulty	LB	13 February 1985 (age 41)	Stockport County	
37	Lewis Dunk	CB	21 November 1991 (age 34)	Youth team graduate	
Midfielders
5	Agustín Battipiedi	CM	1 September 1990 (age 36)	Club Comunicaciones	
7	Elliott Bennett	RM	18 December 1988 (age 37)	Wolverhampton Wanderers	
8	Alan Navarro	CM	31 May 1981 (age 45)	MK Dons	
10	Matt Sparrow	CM	3 October 1981 (age 45)	Scunthorpe United	
11	Cristian Baz	LM/FW	5 May 1987 (age 39)	Club Comunicaciones	
12	Kazenga LuaLua	LW	10 December 1990 (age 35)	Newcastle United	loaned from Newcastle United
15	Gary Hart	RM/FW	21 September 1976 (age 50)	Stansted	
18	Gary Dicker	CM	31 July 1986 (age 40)	Stockport County	
24	Jamie Smith	CM	12 September 1989 (age 37)	Crystal Palace	
25	Radostin Kishishev	CM	30 July 1974 (age 52)	Litex Lovech	
26	Liam Bridcutt	CM	8 May 1989 (age 37)	Chelsea	
28	Jake Forster-Caskey	CM	25 April 1994 (age 32)	Youth team graduate	
29	Yaser Kasim	MF	10 May 1991 (age 35)	Tottenham Hotspur	
31	Craig Noone	LW	17 November 1987 (age 39)	Plymouth Argyle	
36	Ryan Thomson	CM	26 July 1992 (age 34)	Youth team graduate	
Strikers
9	Ashley Barnes	FW	30 October 1989 (age 37)	Plymouth Argyle	
17	Glenn Murray	FW	25 September 1983 (age 43)	Rochdale	
20	Chris Holroyd	FW	24 October 1986 (age 40)	Cambridge United	
21	Francisco Sandaza	FW	30 November 1984 (age 41)	Dundee United	
23	Torbjørn Agdestein	FW	29 November 1991 (age 34)	Stord IL	
39	Chris Wood	FW	7 December 1991 (age 34)	West Bromwich Albion	loaned from West Bromwich Albion

=== Matches ===
Win Draw Loss

==== Pre-season friendlies ====
10 July 2010	Burgess Hill	0–1	Brighton & Hove Albion	Burgess Hill
		summary	Murray 60'	Stadium: Leylands Park; Attendance: TBD

13 July 2010	Whitehawk	3–1	Brighton & Hove Albion	Brighton
	Budd 15'; Tate 35'; Brotherton 69'	summary	Hart 30'	Stadium: The Enclosed Ground; Attendance: TBD

16 July 2010	Bognor Regis Town	2–2	Brighton & Hove Albion	Bognor Regis
	Axten 73'; Birmingham 80'	summary	Murray 44'; Midtgarden 60'	Stadium: Nyewood Lane; Attendance: TBD; Referee: D Austin

17 July 2010	Eastbourne Borough	2– 3	Brighton & Hove Albion	Eastbourne
	Rowe 47'; Treleaven 56'	summary	Battipiedi 8'; Kishishev 70' own goal 75'	Stadium: Langney Sports Club; Attendance: TBD

21 July 2010	Sunderland	1–1	Brighton & Hove Albion	Albufeira (Note: At the Estadio Municipal de Albufeira, Portugal)
	Campbell 87'	summary	Murray 42' (pen.)	Stadium: Estádio Municipal de Albufeira; Attendance: TBD

24 July 2010	Portimonense	2–0	Brighton & Hove Albion	Portimão
	Peña 41'; Ivanildo 59'	summary		Stadium: Estádio Municipal; Attendance: TBD; Referee: Nuno Guerrbeiro

31 July 2010	Brighton & Hove Albion	1–0	Aberdeen	Brighton
	Bennett 38'	summary		Stadium: Withdean Stadium; Attendance: TBD; Referee: Dave Philips

=== League One ===
Matchday	1	2	3	4	5	6	7	8	9	10	11	12	13	14	15	16	17	18	19	20	21	22	23	24	25	26	27	28	29	30	31	32	33	34	35	36	37	38	39	40	41	42	43	44	45	46
Ground	A	H	A	H	H	A	A	H	H	A	H	A	H	A	H	A	H	A	A	H	H	A	H	A	H	A	A	H	H	A	A	H	A	H	A	H	H	A	A	H	H	A	H	A	H	A
Result	W	D	L	W	W	D	W	W	W	D	D	W	W	W	W	L	D	D	L	D	W	W	W	L	W	D	W	W	W	L	W	W	W	W	W	W	W	W	D	W	W	W	L	D	L	D
Position	5	6	11	7	8	8	2	1	1	1	1	1	1	1	1	1	1	1	1	1	1	1	1	1	1	1	1	1	1	1	1	1	1	1	1	1	1	1	1	1	1	1	1	1	1	1

Source: WorldFootball.com
A = Away; H = Home; W = Win; D = Draw; L = Loss

7 August 2010	Swindon Town	1–2	Brighton & Hove Albion	Swindon
15:00 BST	Austin 80'	report	Sparrow 19', 75'	Stadium: County Ground; Attendance: 10,392; Referee: Dean Whitestone

14 August 2010	Brighton & Hove Albion	2–2	Rochdale	Brighton
15:00 BST	Murray 47'; Bennett 67'	report	Jones 53' (pen.), 90+2'	Stadium: Withdean Stadium; Attendance: 6,602; Referee: Danny McDermid

21 August 2010	Sheffield Wednesday	1–0	Brighton & Hove Albion	Hillsborough
15:00 BST	Coke 38'	report		Stadium: Hillsborough Stadium; Attendance: 18,674; Referee: Andy Woolmer

28 August 2010	Brighton & Hove Albion	2–1	Walsall	Brighton
15:00 BST	Barnes 69'; Painter 81'	report	Macken 90+2'	Stadium: Withdean Stadium; Attendance: 6,474; Referee: Graham Horwood

11 September 2010	Brighton & Hove Albion	2–0	MK Dons	Brighton
15:00 BST	LuaLua 49'; Murray 75'	report		Stadium: Withdean Stadium; Attendance: 6,683; Referee: Phil Gibbs

18 September 2010	Carlisle United	0–0	Brighton & Hove Albion	Carlisle
15:00 BST		report		Stadium: Brunton Park; Attendance: 6,039; Referee: J Waugh

21 September 2010	Plymouth Argyle	0–2	Brighton & Hove Albion	Plymouth
19:45 BST		report	Elphick 22'; Barnes 42'	Stadium: Home Park; Attendance: 7,079; Referee: Brendan Malone

25 September 2010	Brighton & Hove Albion	2–1	Oldham Athletic	Brighton
15:00 BST	Barnes 44'; Sandaza 90+6'	report	Alessandra 30'	Stadium: Withdean Stadium; Attendance: 7,148; Referee: Andy Penn

28 September 2010	Brighton & Hove Albion	1–0	Brentford	Brighton
19:45 BST	LuaLua 78'	report		Stadium: Withdean Stadium; Attendance: 6,740; Referee: Gavin Ward

2 October 2010	Tranmere Rovers	1–1	Brighton & Hove Albion	Birkenhead
15:00 BST	Wootton 87'	report	Murray 35'	Stadium: Prenton Park; Attendance: 5,421; Referee: Nigel Miller

9 October 2010	Brighton & Hove Albion	1–1	AFC Bournemouth	Brighton
12:15 BST	LuaLua 61'	report	Pugh 90+2' (pen.)	Stadium: Withdean Stadium; Attendance: 7,348; Referee: Darren Sheldrake

16 October 2010	Charlton Athletic	0–4	Brighton & Hove Albion	Charlton
15:00 BST		report	Calderón 26'; Murray 62'; Lualua 81'; Sparrow 90+4'	Stadium: The Valley; Attendance: 18,949; Referee: Neil Swarbrick

23 October 2010	Brighton & Hove Albion	2–0	Yeovil Town	Brighton
15:00 BST	Murray 43'; Calderón 56'	report		Stadium: Withdean Stadium; Attendance: 7,253; Referee: Phil Crossley

30 October 2010	Peterborough	0–3	Brighton & Hove Albion	Peterborough
15:00 BST		report	Barnes 16', 62'; Calderón 33'	Stadium: London Road Stadium; Attendance: 10,116; Referee: Gary Sutton

2 November 2010	Brighton & Hove Albion	3–0	Exeter City	Brighton
19:45 GMT	El-Abd 7'; Barnes 30', 77'	report		Stadium: Withdean Stadium; Attendance: 7,212; Referee: Keith Hill

13 November 2010	Hartlepool United	3–1	Brighton & Hove Albion	Hartlepool
15:00 GMT	Austin 23'; Liddle 71'; Poole 84'	report	Dicker 57'	Stadium: Victoria Park; Attendance: 3,073; Referee: Russell Booth

20 November 2010	Brighton & Hove Albion	2–2	Bristol Rovers	Brighton
15:00 GMT	Hughes 62' (o.g.); Wood 73'	report	Anthony 24'; Painter 90+3' (o.g.)	Stadium: Withdean Stadium; Attendance: 7,407; Referee: Keith Stroud

23 November 2010	Southampton	0–0	Brighton & Hove Albion	Southampton
19:45 GMT		report		Stadium: St Mary's Stadium; Attendance: 26,237; Referee: Iain Williamson

4 December 2010	Brighton & Hove Albion	Postponed	Colchester United	Brighton
15:00 GMT		report		Stadium: Withdean Stadium

11 December 2010	Huddersfield Town	2–1	Brighton & Hove Albion	Huddersfield
15:00 GMT	Rhodes 56'; McCombe 84'	report	Murray 54'	Stadium: Galpharm Stadium; Attendance: 14,398; Referee: Andy Haines

17 December 2010	Brighton & Hove Albion	Postponed	Notts County	Brighton
19:45 GMT		report		Stadium: Withdean Stadium

26 December 2010	Dagenham & Redbridge	Postponed	Brighton & Hove Albion	Dagenham
13:00 GMT		report		Stadium: Victoria Road

29 December 2010	Brighton & Hove Albion	1–1	Charton Athletic	Brighton
19:45 GMT	Murray 36'	report	Jackson 3'	Stadium: Withdean Stadium; Attendance: 8,374; Referee: Darren Deadman

1 January 2011	Brighton & Hove Albion	5–0	Leyton Orient	Brighton
13:00 GMT	Murray 29', 50', 60'; Jones 31' (o.g.); Barnes 73'	report		Stadium: Withdean Stadium; Attendance: 7,198; Referee: James Linington

3 January 2011	Exeter City	1–2	Brighton & Hove Albion	Exeter
15:00 GMT	Logan 8'	report	Murray 64'; Barnes 90'	Stadium: St James Park; Attendance: 6,352; Referee: Steve Tanner

8 January 2011	Yeovil Town	Postponed	Brighton & Hove Albion	Yeovil (Note: Game was postponed due to a clash with Albion's Third round FA Cup match versus Portsmouth scheduled for the same day.)
15:00 GMT				Stadium: Huish Park

15 January 2011	Brighton & Hove Albion	3–1	Peterborough	Brighton
15:00 GMT	Wood 25', 55'; Bennett 27'	report	Tomlin 66'	Stadium: Withdean Stadium; Attendance: 7,233; Referee: Brendan Malone

22 January 2011	AFC Bournemouth	1–0	Brighton & Hove Albion	Bournemouth
15:00 GMT	Feeney 62'	report 1 report 2		Stadium: Dean Court; Attendance: 9,762; Referee: Keith Hill

25 January 2010	Brighton & Hove Albion	2–0	Colchester United	Brighton (Note: Game was rescheduled due to postponement of original fixture because of snow Archived 10 December 2010 at the Wayback Machine)
19:45 GMT	Calderón 45+1'; Noone 76'	report		Stadium: Withdean Stadium; Attendance: 6,798; Referee: Graham Scott

29 January 2011	Brighton & Hove Albion	Postponed	Dagenham & Redbridge	Brighton (Note: Game was postponed due to a clash with Albion's Fourth round FA Cup match versus Watford scheduled for the same day.)
15:00 GMT				Stadium: Withdean Stadium

1 February 2011	Leyton Orient	0–0	Brighton & Hove Albion	Leyton
19:45 GMT		report 1 report 2		Stadium: Brisbane Road; Attendance: 5,872; Referee: Graham Horwood

5 February 2011	Bristol Rovers	2–4	Brighton & Hove Albion	Bristol
15:00 GMT	Hoskins 2', 86'	report 1 report 2	Barnes 38'; Bennett 52'; Bolger 73' (o.g.); Murray 79'	Stadium: Memorial Stadium; Attendance: 6,683; Referee: Patrick Miller

12 February 2011	Brighton & Hove Albion	4–1	Hartlepool United	Brighton
15:00 GMT	Wood 12'; Murray 17', 56'; Noone 53'	report 1 report 2	Sweeney 63'	Stadium: Withdean Stadium; Attendance: 7,296; Referee: Gavin Ward

21 February 2011	Brighton & Hove Albion	4–0	Plymouth Argyle	Brighton
19:45 GMT	Murray 28', 48'; Wood 41'; Sandaza 90+3'	report		Stadium: Withdean Stadium; Attendance: 7,261; Referee: Mick Russell

26 February 2011	MK Dons	1–0	Brighton & Hove Albion	Milton Keynes
15:00 GMT	Powell 27'	report		Stadium: Stadium:mk; Attendance: 9,327; Referee: Carl Boyeson

1 March 2011	Yeovil Town	0–1	Brighton & Hove Albion	Yeovil
19:45 GMT		report	Bennett 25'	Stadium: Huish Park; Attendance: 3,832; Referee: Scott Mathieson

5 March 2011	Brighton & Hove Albion	4–3	Carlisle United	Brighton
15:00 GMT	Murray 23'; Barnes 53', 63'; Bridcutt 90+3'	report	Taiwo 3'; Marshall 60'; Arter 90+2'	Stadium: Withdean Stadium; Attendance: 7,466; Referee: Oliver Langford

8 March 2011	Brentford	0–1	Brighton & Hove Albion	Brentford
19:45 GMT		report	Osborne 74' (o.g.)	Stadium: Griffin Park; Attendance: 5,694; Referee: Simon Hooper

12 March 2011	Brighton & Hove Albion	2–0	Tranmere Rovers	Brighton
15:00 GMT	Wood 63'; Murray 71'	report		Stadium: Withdean Stadium; Attendance: 7,461; Referee: Steve Rushton

19 March 2011	Oldham Athletic	0–1	Brighton & Hove Albion	Oldham
15:00 GMT		report	Barnes 67'	Stadium: Boundary Park; Attendance: 3,863; Referee: Dean Whitestone

22 March 2011	Brighton & Hove Albion	1–0	Notts County	Brighton
19:45 GMT	Calderón 63'	report		Stadium: Withdean Stadium; Attendance: 7,264; Referee: Phil Crossley

26 March 2011	Brighton & Hove Albion	2–1	Swindon Town	Brighton
13:00 GMT	Dicker 12'; Murray 64'	report	Prutton 22'	Stadium: Withdean Stadium; Attendance: 7,562; Referee: Mark Halsey

29 March 2011	Dagenham & Redbridge	0–1	Brighton & Hove Albion	Dagenham
19:45 BST		report	Murray 59'	Stadium: Victoria Road; Attendance: 3,604; Referee: Andy Woolmer

2 April 2011	Rochdale	2–2	Brighton & Hove Albion	Rochdale
15:00 BST	Atkinson 22'; Jones 71'	report	Wood 29'; Dicker 51'	Stadium: Spotland Stadium; Attendance: 3,959; Referee: David Webb

9 April 2011	Brighton & Hove Albion	2–0	Sheffield Wednesday	Brighton
15:00 BST	Wood 44' (pen.); Bennett 74'	report		Stadium: Withdean Stadium; Attendance: 8,107; Referee: Carl Boyeson

12 April 2011	Brighton & Hove Albion	4–3	Dagenham & Redbridge	Brighton
19:45 BST	Calderón 18'; Murray 19'; Bridcutt 56'; Barnes 63'	report	Akinde 1'; Nurse 48'; Green 51' (pen.)	Stadium: Withdean Stadium; Attendance: 7,619; Referee: Roger East

16 April 2011	Walsall	1–3	Brighton & Hove Albion	Walsall
15:00 BST	Butler 11'	report	Calderón 6'; Murray 47'; Bennett 90'	Stadium: Bescot Stadium; Attendance: 6,015; Referee: Jonathan Moss

23 April 2011	Brighton & Hove Albion	1–2	Southampton	Brighton
15:00 BST	Barnes 45+1'	report	Connolly 84'; Fonte 89'	Stadium: Withdean Stadium; Attendance: 8,169; Referee: Scott Mathieson

25 April 2011	Colchester United	1–1	Brighton & Hove Albion	Colchester
12:15 BST	Henderson 16'	report	Barnes 72'	Stadium: Colchester Community Stadium; Attendance: 5,132; Referee: Keith Stroud

30 April 2011	Brighton & Hove Albion	2–3	Huddersfield Town	Brighton
15:00 BST	Barnes 47'; Sparrow 69'	report	Afobe 8', 61'; Ward 89'	Stadium: Withdean Stadium; Attendance: 8,416; Referee: Steve Tanner

7 May 2011	Notts County	1–1	Brighton & Hove Albion	Nottingham
15:00 BST	Greer 36' (o.g.)	report	Barnes 12'	Stadium: Meadow Lane; Attendance: 10,347; Referee: Simon Hooper

=== FA Cup ===
As they were playing in League One, Albion entered the 2010–11 FA Cup at the first round proper.

6 Nov 2010 1st round	Brighton & Hove Albion	0–0	Woking	Brighton
15:00 GMT		report 1 report 2		Stadium: Withdean Stadium; Attendance: 5,868; Referee: Mick Russell

13 Nov 2010 Replay	Woking	2–2 (a.e.t.) (0–3 p)	Brighton & Hove Albion	Woking
19:45 GMT	Greer 72' (o.g.); Sagbanmu 103'	report 1 report 2	Sparrow 57'; Bennett 105'	Stadium: Kingfield Stadium; Attendance: 4,193; Referee: Roger East
	Penalties
	Sogbanmu (penalty missed); Faulconbridge (penalty missed); Hammond (penalty missed)		Murray (penalty scored); Sparrow (penalty scored); Battipiedi (penalty missed); Baz (penalty scored)

27 Nov 2010 2nd round	Brighton & Hove Albion	1–1	FC United of Manchester	Brighton
15:00 GMT	Taricco 83'	report 1 report 2	Platt 40'	Stadium: Withdean Stadium; Attendance: 5,362; Referee: Chris Sarginson

8 Dec 2010 Replay	FC United of Manchester	0–4	Brighton & Hove Albion	Bury
19:45 GMT		report 1 report 2	Sandaza 25'; Calderón 45+3'; Bennett 86'; Sparrow 90'	Stadium: Gigg Lane; Attendance: 7,000; Referee: Eddie Ilderton

8 Jan 2011 3rd round	Brighton & Hove Albion	3–1	Portsmouth	Brighton
15:00 GMT	Wood 26'; Barnes 45+4' (pen.); Sandaza 90+1'	report 1 report 2	Tom Kilbey 88'	Stadium: Withdean Stadium; Attendance: 7,792; Referee: Graham Scott

29 Jan 2011 4th round	Watford	0–1	Brighton & Hove Albion	Watford
15:00 GMT		report 1 report 2	Barnes 16'	Stadium: Vicarage Road; Attendance: 14,519; Referee: Eddie Ilderton

19 Feb 2011 5th round	Stoke City	3–0	Brighton & Hove Albion	Stoke-on-Trent
15:00 GMT	Carew 14'; Walters 22'; Shawcross 43'	report 1 report 2		Stadium: Britannia Stadium; Attendance: 21,312; Referee: Howard Webb

=== Football League Cup ===
10 Aug 2010 First round	Northampton	2–0	Brighton & Hove Albion	Northampton
19:45 BST	Jacobs 13'; McKay 18'	report 1 report 2		Stadium: Sixfields Stadium; Attendance: 2,431; Referee: Craig Pawson

=== League Trophy ===
1 Sep 2010 First round	Brighton & Hove Albion	0–2	Leyton Orient	Brighton
19:15 BST		report 1 report 2	Cox 21'; Jarvis 47'	Stadium: Withdean Stadium; Attendance: 3,124; Referee: Iain Williamson

== Statistics ==
=== Appearances, goals and cards ===
As of Fixture vs Notts County(7 May 2011).
(Substitute appearances in brackets)

No.	Pos.	Name	League		FA Cup		League Cup		League Trophy		Total		Discipline	
No.	Pos.	Name	Apps	Goals	Apps	Goals	Apps	Goals	Apps	Goals	Apps	Goals	Yellow card	Red card
1	GK	Peter Brezovan	1 (1)	0	7	0	0	0	0	0	8 (1)	0	0	0
3	DF	Gordon Greer	32	0	4	0	0	0	0	0	36	0	4	2
4	DF	Tommy Elphick	22 (5)	1	6	0	1	0	1	0	30 (5)	1	8	0
5	DF	Agustín Battipiedi	3 (5)	0	1 (3)	0	1	0	0	0	5 (8)	0	2	0
6	DF	Adam El-Abd	36 (1)	1	2	0	1	0	1	0	40 (1)	1	9	0
7	MF	Elliott Bennett	45 (1)	6	5	2	0 (1)	0	1	0	51 (2)	8	4	0
8	MF	Alan Navarro	2 (2)	0	0	0	0 (1)	0	0	0	2 (3)	0	0	0
9	FW	Ashley Barnes	31 (11)	18	6	2	0	0	1	0	38 (11)	20	7	0
10	MF	Matt Sparrow	21 (8)	4	5	2	1	0	1	0	28 (8)	6	4	1
11	MF	Cristian Baz	0 (7)	0	2 (3)	0	1	0	0 (1)	0	3 (11)	0	0	0
12	MF	Kazenga LuaLua	7 (4)	4	0	0	0	0	0	0	7 (4)	4	1	0
13	GK	Mitch Walker	0	0	0	0	0	0	0	0	0	0	0	0
14	DF	Iñigo Calderón	44	7	5	1	0	0	1	0	50	8	4	1
15	MF	Gary Hart	0 (3)	0	1 (3)	0	1	0	0 (1)	0	2 (7)	0	0	0
16	GK	Casper Ankergren	45	0	0	0	0	0	1	0	46	0	2	0
17	FW	Glenn Murray	38 (4)	22	6 (1)	0	0	0	1	0	45 (5)	22	6	0
18	MF	Gary Dicker	38 (8)	3	4	0	1	0	1	0	44 (8)	3	5	0
19	GK	Michael Poke	0	0	0	0	1	0	0	0	1	0	0	0
20	FW	Chris Holroyd	0 (3)	0	0 (1)	0	1	0	0	0	1 (4)	0	0	0
21	FW	Fran Sandaza	3 (12)	2	1 (3)	2	0	0	0	0	4 (15)	4	1	0
22	DF	Marcos Painter	46	1	6	0	1	0	1	0	54	1	5	0
23	FW	Torbjorn Agdestein	0	0	0	0	0	0	0	0	0	0	0	0
24	MF	Jamie Smith	3 (5)	0	0 (2)	0	0 (1)	0	0 (1)	0	3 (9)	0	0	0
25	MF	Radostin Kishishev	21 (11)	0	4	0	0	0	0	0	25 (11)	0	3	0
26	MF	Liam Bridcutt	31 (6)	2	5 (1)	0	0	0	1	0	37 (7)	2	5	1
27	DF	Mauricio Taricco	2 (2)	0	3	1	0	0	0	0	5 (2)	1	1	1
28	MF	Jake Forster-Caskey	0	0	0 (1)	0	0	0	0	0	0 (1)	0	0	0
29	MF	Yaser Kasim	1	0	0	0	0	0	0	0	1	0	0	0
30	DF	Steve Cook	0	0	0	0	0	0	0	0	0	0	0	0
31	MF	Craig Noone	10 (13)	2	0	0	0	0	0	0	10 (13)	2	1	0
33	DF	Jimmy McNulty	0	0	0	0	0	0	0	0	0	0	0	0
36	MF	Ryan Thomson	0	0	0	0	0	0	0	0	0	0	0	0
37	DF	Lewis Dunk	2 (3)	0	2 (1)	0	0	0	0	0	4 (4)	0	0	0
39	FW	Chris Wood	22 (7)	8	2	1	0	0	0	0	24 (7)	9	1	0
		Own Goals	0	4	0	0	0	0	0	0	0	4	0	0

=== Formation ===
Formation	League	FA Cup	League Cup	League Trophy	Total
4–4–2	33	5	1	1	40
4–5–1	2	0	0	0	2
4–3–3	5	2	0	0	7
	40	7	1	1	49

=== Monthly awards ===
Month	Manager of the Month	Player of the Month	Notes
Month	Manager	Player	Notes
September	Gus Poyet	Casper Ankergren	
March	Gus Poyet	Casper Ankergren	

=== Team of the Year ===
League One

Pos.	Player	Club
GK	Kelvin Davis	Southampton
DF	Iñigo Calderón	Brighton & Hove Albion
DF	Dan Harding	Southampton
DF	Gordon Greer	Brighton & Hove Albion
DF	José Fonte	Southampton
MF	Anthony Pilkington	Huddersfield Town
MF	Elliott Bennett	Brighton & Hove Albion
MF	Adam Lallana	Southampton
MF	Alex Oxlade-Chamberlain	Southampton
FW	Craig Mackail-Smith	Peterborough United
FW	Bradley Wright-Phillips	Charlton Athletic

== Transfers ==
=== In ===
Date	Name	From	Fee	Ref.
11 June 2010	Michael Poke	Southampton	Free	
July 2010	Marcos Painter	Swansea City	Free	
28 June 2010	Agustín Battipiedi	Club Comunicaciones	Free	
28 June 2010	Cristian Baz	Club Comunicaciones	Free	
29 June 2010	Matt Sparrow	Scunthorpe United	Free	
8 July 2010	Ashley Barnes	Plymouth Argyle	Undisclosed	
16 July 2010	Radostin Kishishev	Litex Lovech	Free	
11 July 2010	Gordon Greer	Swindon Town	£250,000	
1 September 2010	Francisco Sandaza	Dundee United	Free	
28 August 2010	Liam Bridcutt	Chelsea	Free	
31 December 2010	Craig Noone	Plymouth Argyle	Undisclosed	

=== Out ===
Date	Name	To	Fee	Ref.
May 2010	Michel Kuipers	Crawley Town	Free	
June 2010	Nicky Forster	Brentford	Free	
July 2010	Craig Davies	Chesterfield	Free	
July 2010	Andrew Crofts	Norwich	£300,000	
July 2010	Jake Wright	Oxford United	Free	
July 2010	Liam Dickinson	Barnsley	Undisclosed	
July 2010	Steve Brinkhurst	Eastbourne Borough	Undisclosed	
13 November 2010	Kazenga LuaLua	Newcastle United	Loan Return	
7 January 2011	Andy Whing	Leyton Orient	Free	

=== Loan in ===
Date	Name	From	Length of Loan	Ref.
31 August 2010	Kazenga LuaLua	Newcastle United	Four-Month Loan	
19 November 2010	Chris Wood	West Bromwich Albion	Two-Month Loan	

=== Loan out ===
Date	Name	To	Length of Loan	Ref.
July 2010	James Tunnicliffe	Bristol Rovers	Season-Long Loan	
July 2010	Jimmy McNulty	Scunthorpe United	Six-Month Loan	
September 2010	Steve Cook	Eastbourne Borough	One-Month Loan	
September 2010	Chris Holroyd	Stevenage	Three-Month Loan	
October 2010	Steve Cook	Mansfield Town	Three-Month Loan	
October 2010	Andy Whing	Leyton Orient	Two-month Loan	
January 2011	Mitch Walker	Welling United		
March 2011	Chris Holroyd	Bury	One-Month Loan	

=== Trialists ===
Date	Name	Position	Club	Ref.
July 2010	Eric Midtgarden	Forward		
July 2010	Filipe Morais	Winger	Oldham Athletic	
August 2010	Diego Camacho	Defensive midfielder	Albacete	
January 2011	Emmanuel Ledesma	Attacking midfielder	Walsall	
April 2011	Kosta Barbarouses	Striker	Brisbane Roar	
