= 2011–12 Brighton & Hove Albion F.C. season =

110th season in existence of Brighton & Hove Albion

Brighton & Hove Albion F.C.
2011–12 season
- Chairman: Tony Bloom
- Manager: Gus Poyet
- Stadium: Falmer Stadium
- Championship: 10th
- FA Cup: 5th Round
- League Cup: 3rd round
- Top goalscorer: League: Ashley Barnes (11); All: Ashley Barnes (14)
- Highest home attendance: 21,558 vs. Newcastle United, 28 January 2012
- Lowest home attendance: 16,295 vs. Gillingham, 9 August 2011
- Average home league attendance: 20,003
Home colours	Away colours

The 2011–12 season was Brighton & Hove Albion's first year in the Championship, returning after being promoted as champions of League One during the 2010–11 season. It was also Brighton's first season at their new home, the Falmer Stadium.

The season was a successful one for the club, finishing 10th in the league, and reaching the Third Round of the League Cup and Fifth Round of the FA Cup (coincidentally being knocked out by eventual League Cup Champions and FA Cup runners up Liverpool on both occasions). Ashley Barnes was top scorer in both the league and across all competitions.

== League table ==
Pos	Team	Pld	W	D	L	GF	GA	GD	Pts
8	Hull City	46	19	11	16	47	44	+3	68
9	Leicester City	46	18	12	16	66	55	+11	66
10	Brighton & Hove Albion	46	17	15	14	52	52	0	66
11	Watford	46	16	16	14	56	64	−8	64
12	Derby County	46	18	10	18	50	58	−8	64

Updated to match(es) played on 28 April 2012. Source: BBC Sport
Rules for classification: 1) points; 2) goal difference; 3) number of goals scored.

== Squad statistics ==
=== Statistics ===
As of 29 April 2012

No.	Pos	Nat	Player	Total		Championship		FA Cup		League Cup	
No.	Pos	Nat	Player	Apps	Goals	Apps	Goals	Apps	Goals	Apps	Goals
1	GK	(Slovakia) SVK	Peter Brezovan	24	0	20+0	0	4+0	0	0+0	0
2	DF	(England) ENG	Joe Mattock	15	1	14+1	1	0+0	0	0+0	0
3	DF	(Scotland) SCO	Gordon Greer	47	1	42+0	1	2+0	0	3+0	0
4	DF	(England) ENG	Tommy Elphick	0	0	0+0	0	0+0	0	0+0	0
5	DF	(England) ENG	Lewis Dunk	36	0	31+0	0	3+0	0	2+0	0
6	DF	(England) ENG	Adam El-Abd	25	0	21+2	0	2+0	0	0+0	0
7	FW	(England) ENG	Will Hoskins	9	1	2+5	1	1+1	0	0+0	0
8	MF	(England) ENG	Alan Navarro	39	1	24+9	1	3+1	0	2+0	0
9	FW	(England) ENG	Ashley Barnes	52	14	36+7	11	4+1	1	2+2	2
10	MF	(England) ENG	Matt Sparrow	21	2	15+3	2	2+0	0	1+0	0
11	MF	(England) ENG	Craig Noone	37	2	18+15	2	0+1	0	3+0	0
12	FW	(Scotland) SCO	Craig Mackail-Smith	50	10	41+4	9	2+1	0	2+0	1
13	MF	(Israel) ISR	Gai Assulin	7	0	2+5	0	0+0	0	0+0	0
14	DF	(Spain) ESP	Iñigo Calderón	39	4	30+2	4	4+0	0	3+0	0
15	MF	(Spain) ESP	Vicente Rodríguez	19	3	11+6	3	0+1	0	0+1	0
16	GK	(Denmark) DEN	Casper Ankergren	22	0	19+0	0	0+0	0	3+0	0
17	MF	(England) ENG	Ryan Harley	18	2	13+3	2	0+1	0	1+0	0
18	MF	(Republic of Ireland) IRL	Gary Dicker	19	0	17+1	0	0+0	0	1+0	0
20	DF	(France) FRA	Romain Vincelot	20	1	10+5	1	2+0	0	2+1	0
21	GK	(Colombia) COL	David González	2	0	2+0	0	0+0	0	0+0	0
22	DF	(Republic of Ireland) IRL	Marcos Painter	20	0	18+0	0	0+0	0	2+0	0
23	FW	(Norway) NOR	Torbjørn Agdestein	6	0	0+4	0	0+2	0	0+0	0
24	FW	(Wales) WAL	Sam Vokes	12	3	6+5	3	1+0	0	0+0	0
25	MF	(Democratic Republic of the Congo) COD	Kazenga LuaLua	30	2	10+16	1	2+0	1	0+2	0
26	MF	(England) ENG	Liam Bridcutt	49	0	43+0	0	3+0	0	3+0	0
27	DF	(Argentina) ARG	Mauricio Taricco	12	0	9+2	0	0+0	0	0+1	0
28	MF	(Ivory Coast) CIV	Abdul Razak	6	0	4+2	0	0+0	0	0+0	0
29	FW	(Netherlands) NED	Roland Bergkamp	0	0	0+0	0	0+0	0	0+0	0
30	MF	(England) ENG	Will Buckley	35	8	16+13	8	4+0	0	2+0	0
31	MF	(England) ENG	Grant Hall	3	0	0+1	0	2+0	0	0+0	0
32	MF	(Iraq) IRQ	Yaser Kasim	1	0	0+0	0	0+1	0	0+0	0
33	FW	(England) ENG	George Barker	0	0	0+0	0	0+0	0	0+0	0
34	DF	(England) ENG	Ben Sampayo	1	0	0+0	0	1+0	0	0+0	0
35	MF	(England) ENG	Jake Forster-Caskey	6	2	3+1	1	2+0	1	0+0	0
36	DF	(Chile) CHI	Gonzalo Jara	14	0	14+0	0	0+0	0	0+0	0
44	MF	(England) ENG	Anton Rodgers	1	0	0+0	0	0+1	0	0+0	0
Players currently out on loan:
19	GK	(England) ENG	Michael Poke	0	0	0+0	0	0+0	0	0+0	0
Players featured for club who have left:
	GK	(England) ENG	Steve Harper	5	0	5+0	0	0+0	0	0+0	0

=== Top scorers ===
Place	Position	Nation	Number	Name	Championship	FA Cup	League Cup	Total
1	FW	(England)	9	Ashley Barnes	11	1	2	14
2	FW	(Scotland)	12	Craig Mackail-Smith	9	0	1	10
3	MF	(England)	30	Will Buckley	8	0	0	8
4	DF	(Spain)	14	Iñigo Calderón	5	0	0	5
5	MF	(Spain)	15	Vicente Rodríguez	3	0	0	3
5	FW	(Wales)	24	Sam Vokes	3	0	0	3
6
6	MF	(England)	35	Jake Forster-Caskey	1	1	0	2
6	MF	(England)	17	Ryan Harley	2	0	0	2
6	MF	(Democratic Republic of the Congo)	25	Kazenga LuaLua	1	1	0	2
6	MF	(England)	11	Craig Noone	2	0	0	2
6	MF	(England)	10	Matt Sparrow	2	0	0	2
12	DF	(Scotland)	3	Gordon Greer	1	0	0	1
12	FW	(England)	7	Will Hoskins	1	0	0	1
12	DF	(England)	2	Joe Mattock	1	0	0	1
12	MF	(England)	8	Alan Navarro	1	0	0	1
12	DF	(France)	20	Romain Vincelot	1	0	0	1
12	Own Goals				1	1	0	2
				TOTALS	56	4	3	63

=== Disciplinary record ===
Number	Nation	Position	Name	Championship		FA Cup		League Cup		Total	
Number	Nation	Position	Name	Yellow card	Red card	Yellow card	Red card	Yellow card	Red card	Yellow card	Red card
10	(England)	MF	Matt Sparrow	3	2	2	0	1	0	6	2
5	(England)	DF	Lewis Dunk	12	0	0	0	1	0	13	0
26	(England)	MF	Liam Bridcutt	11	0	0	0	0	0	11	0
3	(Scotland)	DF	Gordon Greer	8	1	0	0	0	0	8	1
9	(England)	FW	Ashley Barnes	6	1	1	0	0	0	7	1
36	(Chile)	GK	Gonzalo Jara	4	1	0	0	0	0	4	1
22	(Republic of Ireland)	DF	Marcos Painter	3	1	0	0	1	0	4	1
27	(Argentina)	DF	Mauricio Taricco	3	1	0	0	1	0	4	1
20	(France)	DF	Romain Vincelot	2	1	1	0	1	0	4	1
6	(England)	DF	Adam El-Abd	8	0	0	0	0	0	8	0
8	(England)	MF	Alan Navarro	4	0	2	0	2	0	8	0
14	(Spain)	DF	Iñigo Calderón	6	0	0	0	1	0	7	0
18	(Republic of Ireland)	MF	Gary Dicker	5	0	0	0	0	0	5	0
11	(England)	MF	Craig Noone	5	0	0	0	0	0	5	0
25	(Democratic Republic of the Congo)	MF	Kazenga LuaLua	4	0	0	0	0	0	4	0
16	(Denmark)	GK	Casper Ankergren	2	0	0	0	1	0	3	0
12	(Scotland)	FW	Craig Mackail-Smith	3	0	0	0	0	0	3	0
23	(Norway)	FW	Torbjørn Agdestein	1	0	0	0	0	0	1	0
1	(Slovakia)	GK	Peter Brezovan	1	0	0	0	0	0	1	0
32	(Iraq)	MF	Yaser Kasim	0	0	1	0	0	0	1	0
15	(Spain)	MF	Vicente Rodríguez	1	0	0	0	0	0	1	0
34	(England)	DF	Ben Sampayo	0	0	1	0	0	0	1	0
			TOTALS	93	8	8	0	8	0	109	8

== Matches ==
Win Draw Loss

=== Pre-season friendlies ===
10 July 2011	Burgess Hill Town	0–3	Brighton & Hove Albion	Leylands Park
13:00			Barnes 26'; Noone 65' (pen.); Hoskins 79'

13 July 2011	Horsham	1–3	Brighton & Hove Albion	Woodside Road
19:45	Rook 46'		Agdestein 70'; Noone 73'; Barker 88'

15 July 2011	Whitehawk	0–3	Brighton & Hove Albion	The Enclosed Ground
19:45			Noone 31'; Bergkamp 47'; Dunk 54'

16 July 2011	Brighton & Hove Albion	2–0	Eastbourne Borough	Falmer Stadium
15:00	Hart 70'; Cook 83'			Attendance: 7,104

19 July 2011	Tottenham Hotspur XI	2–2	Brighton & Hove Albion	White Hart Lane
19:30	Townsend 40'; Soli 55'		Hoskins 21'; Agdestein 39'

20 July 2011	Paris Saint-Germain	1–0	Brighton & Hove Albion	Parc des Princes
19:30	Nenê 28'

23 July 2011	Olhanense	2–1	Brighton & Hove Albion	José Arcanjo
17:00	Vincelot 76' (o.g.); Salvador 88'		Sparrow 50'

30 July 2011	Brighton & Hove Albion	2–3	Tottenham Hotspur	Falmer Stadium
15:00	Barnes 11'; LuaLua 62'		Kaboul 42'; Ćorluka 44'; Livermore 69'	Referee: Dave Phillips

=== Championship ===
6 August 2011 1	Brighton & Hove Albion	2–1	Doncaster Rovers	Falmer Stadium
15:00	Buckley 83', 90+8'		Sharp 39'	Attendance: 20,219

13 August 2011 2	Portsmouth	0–1	Brighton & Hove Albion	Fratton Park
15:00			Mackail-Smith 45+1'	Attendance: 16,496

17 August 2011 3	Cardiff City	1–3	Brighton & Hove Albion	Cardiff City Stadium
19:45	Whittingham 90' (pen.)		Barnes 39', 63' (pen.); Hoskins 87'	Attendance: 23,013

20 August 2011 4	Brighton & Hove Albion	2–2	Blackpool	Falmer Stadium
15:00	Mackail-Smith 29'; Barnes 50'		K. Phillips 60', 90'	Attendance: 19,494

27 August 2011 5	Brighton & Hove Albion	2–0	Peterborough United	Falmer Stadium
15:00	Noone 10'; Harley 64'			Attendance: 19,656

10 September 2011 6	Bristol City	0–1	Brighton & Hove Albion	Ashton Gate
15:00			Barnes 80'	Attendance: 13,911

17 September 2011 7	Leicester City	1–0	Brighton & Hove Albion	Filbert Way
15:00	Abe 46'			Attendance: 24,128

23 September 2011 8	Brighton & Hove Albion	3–3	Leeds United	Falmer Stadium
19:45	Mackail-Smith 48', 84'; Barnes 61' (pen.)		Keogh 19'; McCormack 24', 91'	Attendance: 20,646

27 September 2011 9	Brighton & Hove Albion	1–3	Crystal Palace	Falmer Stadium
19:45	Mackail-Smith 7'		Zaha 80'; Ambrose 89'; Murray 90+1'	Attendance: 20,968

1 October 2011 10	Ipswich Town	3–1	Brighton & Hove Albion	Portman Road
15:00	Chopra 59', 73'; Sonko 70'		Rodríguez 53'	Attendance: 19,793

15 October 2011 11	Brighton & Hove Albion	0–0	Hull City	Falmer Stadium
17:30				Attendance: 19,722

18 October 2011 12	Millwall	1–1	Brighton & Hove Albion	The Den
19:45	Simpson 81'		Noone 61'	Attendance: 11,688

24 October 2011 13	Brighton & Hove Albion	0–1	West Ham United	Falmer Stadium
19:45			Nolan 18'	Attendance: 20,686

29 October 2011 14	Birmingham City	0–0	Brighton & Hove Albion	St Andrew's
15:00				Attendance: 20,095

1 November 2011 15	Watford	1–0	Brighton & Hove Albion	Vicarage Road
19:45			Deeney 77'	Attendance: 11,818

5 November 2011 16	Brighton & Hove Albion	2–0	Barnsley	Falmer Stadium
15:00	Greer 45'; Harley 57'			Attendance: 19,841

19 November 2011 17	Southampton	3–0	Brighton & Hove Albion	St Mary's Stadium
15:00	Lambert 49', 58' (pen.), 69' (pen.)			Attendance: 31,812

26 November 2011 18	Brighton & Hove Albion	2–1	Coventry City	Falmer Stadium
15:00	Keogh 7' (o.g.); Vincelot 37'		Gardner 9'	Attendance: 19,108

29 November 2011 19	Derby County	0–1	Brighton & Hove Albion	Pride Park Stadium
19:45			Mackail-Smith 13'	Attendance: 22,040

3 December 2011 20	Brighton & Hove Albion	1–0	Nottingham Forest	Falmer Stadium
15:00	Buckley 90+2'			Attendance: 20,385

10 December 2011 21	Middlesbrough	1–0	Brighton & Hove Albion	Riverside Stadium
15:00	McDonald 21'			Attendance: 16,594

17 December 2011 22	Brighton & Hove Albion	0–1	Burnley	Falmer Stadium
15:00			Trippier 32'	Attendance: 19,641

26 December 2011 23	Reading	3–0	Brighton & Hove Albion	Madejski Stadium
15:00	McAnuff 17', 45+2'; El-Abd 90+2' (o.g.)			Attendance: 22,141

31 December 2011 24	Coventry City	2–0	Brighton & Hove Albion	Ricoh Arena
15:00	McSheffrey 34'; Jutkiewicz 54'			Attendance: 14,158

2 January 2012 25	Brighton & Hove Albion	3–0	Southampton	Falmer Stadium
15:00	Forster-Caskey 66'; Sparrow 76', 86'			Attendance: 20,773

14 January 2012 26	Brighton & Hove Albion	2–0	Bristol City	Falmer Stadium
15:00	Calderón 37'; Buckley 73'			Attendance: 20,398

21 January 2012 27	Peterborough United	1–2	Brighton & Hove Albion	London Road Stadium
15:00	Ball 72'		Buckley 32', 88'	Attendance: 9,474

31 January 2012 28	Crystal Palace	1–1	Brighton & Hove Albion	Selhurst Park
19:45	Martin 64' (pen.)		Barnes 74' (pen.)	Attendance: 17,271

4 February 2012 29	Brighton & Hove Albion	1–0	Leicester City	Falmer Stadium
15:00	Buckley 90'			Attendance: 20,223

11 February 2012 30	Leeds United	1–2	Brighton & Hove Albion	Elland Road
15:00	Becchio 79'		Mackail-Smith 77'; Navarro 90'	Attendance: 23,171

14 February 2012 31	Brighton & Hove Albion	2–2	Millwall	Falmer Stadium
19:45	Vokes 52'; Lualua 88'		Keogh 23'; Feeney 64'	Attendance: 19,503

22 February 2012 32	Hull City	0–0	Brighton & Hove Albion	KC Stadium
19:45				Attendance: 17,769

25 February 2012 33	Brighton & Hove Albion	3–0	Ipswich Town	Falmer Stadium
15:00	Mackail-Smith 20'; Barnes 65', 88'			Attendance: 20,490

3 March 2012 34	Doncaster Rovers	1–1	Brighton & Hove Albion	Keepmoat Stadium
15:00	Diouf 79' (pen.)		Mackail-Smith 20'	Attendance: 8,964

7 March 2012 35	Brighton & Hove Albion	2–2	Cardiff City	Falmer Stadium
19:45	Barnes 72'; Vokes 89'		Mason 57'; Whittingham 74'	Attendance: 18,786

10 March 2012 36	Brighton & Hove Albion	2–0	Portsmouth	Falmer Stadium
15:00	Vicente 75', 90'			Attendance: 20,772

17 March 2012 37	Blackpool	3–1	Brighton & Hove Albion	Bloomfield Road
15:00	Evatt 37'; Phillips 40', 80'		Mattock 7'	Attendance: 12,782

20 March 2012 38	Brighton & Hove Albion	2–0	Derby County	Falmer Stadium
19:45	Calderón 10'; Barnes 66'			Attendance: 18,412

24 March 2012 39	Nottingham Forest	1–1	Brighton & Hove Albion	City Ground
15:00	Lynch 90+4'		Vokes 63'	Attendance: 21,249

31 March 2012 40	Brighton & Hove Albion	1–1	Middlesbrough	Falmer Stadium
15:00	Calderón 73'		Emnes 61'	Attendance: 20,553

6 April 2012 41	Burnley	1–0	Brighton & Hove Albion	Turf Moor
15:00	Austin 23'			Attendance: 13,516

10 April 2012 42	Brighton & Hove Albion	0–1	Reading	Falmer Stadium
19:45			Harte 14'	Attendance: 20,610

14 April 2012 43	West Ham United	6–0	Brighton & Hove Albion	Boleyn Ground
15:00	Vaz Te 3', 8', 62'; Nolan 11'; Cole 64'; Dicker 78' (o.g.)			Attendance: 32,339

17 April 2012 44	Brighton & Hove Albion	2–2	Watford	Falmer Stadium
19:45	Calderón 55'; Buckley 79'		Murray 6'; Deeney 44' (pen.)	Attendance: 19,189

21 April 2012 45	Brighton & Hove Albion	1–1	Birmingham City	Falmer Stadium
15:00	Barnes 84'		Redmond 69'	Attendance: 20,594

28 April 2012 46	Barnsley	0–0	Brighton & Hove Albion	Oakwell
12:30				Attendance: 10,151

==== Result round by round ====
Round	1	2	3	4	5	6	7	8	9	10	11	12	13	14	15	16	17	18	19	20	21	22	23	24	25	26	27	28	29	30	31	32	33	34	35	36	37	38	39	40	41	42	43	44	45	46
Ground	H	A	A	H	H	A	A	H	H	A	H	A	H	A	A	H	A	H	A	H	A	H	A	A	H	H	A	A	H	A	H	A	H	A	H	H	A	H	A	H	A	H	A	H	H	A
Result	W	W	W	D	W	W	L	D	L	L	D	D	L	D	L	W	L	W	W	W	L	L	L	L	W	W	W	D	W	W	D	D	W	D	D	W	L	W	D	D	L	L	L	D	D	D
Position	3	2	2	3	1	1	3	3	5	6	5	12	12	10	12	10	11	11	7	6	7	9	11	16	13	12	10	11	10	8	9	9	7	7	7	5	8	4	4	6	7	7	8	9	9	10

Updated to match(es) played on 28 April 2012. Source: seagulls.co.uk
A = Away; H = Home; W = Win; D = Draw; L = Loss

=== FA Cup ===
7 January 2012 3rd round	Brighton & Hove Albion	1–1	Wrexham	Brighton
15:00 GMT	Forster-Caskey 48'		Cieslewicz 62'	Stadium: Falmer Stadium; Attendance: 18,573; Referee: Deadman

18 January 2012 Replay	Wrexham	1–1 (a.e.t.) (4–5 p)	Brighton & Hove Albion	Wrexham
19:15 GMT	Morrell 23'		Barnes 77'	Stadium: Racecourse Ground; Attendance: 8,316; Referee: Webster
	Penalties
	Keates (penalty missed); Clarke (penalty scored); Hunt (penalty scored); Ashton (penalty scored); Little (penalty scored)		Barnes (penalty scored); Sparrow (penalty scored); Bridcutt (penalty scored); Calderón (penalty scored); Mackail-Smith (penalty scored)

28 January 2012 4th round	Brighton & Hove Albion	1–0	Newcastle United	Falmer Stadium, Falmer
17:15 GMT	Williamson 76' (o.g.)			Attendance: 21,558; Referee: Propert

19 February 2012 5th Round	Liverpool	6–1	Brighton & Hove Albion	Anfield, Liverpool
17:00 GMT	Škrtel 5'; Bridcutt 44', 71' (o.g.); Carroll 57'; Dunk 74' (o.g.); Suárez 85'		LuaLua 17'	Attendance: 43,940; Referee: Marriner

=== League Cup ===
9 August 2011 Round 1	Brighton & Hove Albion	1–0	Gillingham	Falmer Stadium
19:45	Barnes 67' (pen.)			Attendance: 16,295; Referee: Malone

23 August 2011 Round 2	Brighton & Hove Albion	1–0 (a.e.t.)	Sunderland	Falmer Stadium
19:45	Mackail-Smith 96'			Attendance: 17,090; Referee: D'Urso

21 September 2011 Round 3	Brighton & Hove Albion	1–2	Liverpool	Falmer Stadium
19:45	Barnes 90' (pen.)		Bellamy 7'; Kuyt 81'	Attendance: 21,897; Referee: Oliver

== Transfers ==
Players transferred in
Date	Pos.	Name	From	Fee	Ref.
20 May 2011	FW	(England) Will Hoskins	(England) Bristol Rovers	Undisclosed	
29 May 2011	DF	(England) Ben Sampayo	(England) Chelsea	Free	
29 May 2011	MF	(England) Anton Rodgers	(England) Chelsea	Free	
6 June 2011	MF	(England) Will Buckley	(England) Watford	£1,000,000	
1 July 2011	FW	(Netherlands) Roland Bergkamp	(Netherlands) SBV Excelsior	Undisclosed	
4 July 2011	FW	(Scotland) Craig Mackail-Smith	(England) Peterborough United	Undisclosed	
15 July 2011	DF	(France) Romain Vincelot	(England) Dagenham & Redbridge	Undisclosed	
15 July 2011	GK	(England) Daniel East	(England) Wolverhampton Wanderers	Free	
22 August 2011	MF	(England) Ryan Harley	(Wales) Swansea City	Undisclosed	
2 September 2011	MF	(Spain) Vicente	Free agent	Free	
21 November 2011	MF	(Democratic Republic of the Congo) Kazenga LuaLua	(England) Newcastle United	Undisclosed	
19 January 2012	GK	(Colombia) David González	Free agent	Free	
20 January 2012	FW	(England) Ben Dickenson	(England) Dorchester Town	Undisclosed	
Players transferred out
Date	Pos.	Name	To	Fee	Ref.
24 May 2011	FW	(England) Glenn Murray	(England) Crystal Palace	Free	
29 May 2011	MF	(England) Ryan Thomson	Free agent	Free	
29 May 2011	GK	(England) Mitch Walker	Free agent	Free	
29 May 2011	GK	(England) Josh Pelling	Free agent	Free	
29 May 2011	MF	(Argentina) Cristian Baz	Free agent	Free	
31 May 2011	MF	(Argentina) Agustin Battipiedi	Free agent	Free	
14 June 2011	MF	(England) Elliott Bennett	(England) Norwich City	Undisclosed	
20 June 2011	FW	(England) Chris Holroyd	(England) Rotherham United	Free	
22 June 2011	DF	(England) James Tunnicliffe	(England) Wycombe Wanderers	Free	
24 June 2011	DF	(Scotland) Jimmy McNulty	(England) Barnsley	Undisclosed	
3 July 2011	MF	(Bulgaria) Radostin Kishishev	(Bulgaria) Chernomorets Burgas	Free	
23 July 2011	MF	(England) Gary Hart	(England) Eastbourne Borough	Free	
25 July 2011	FW	(Spain) Francisco Sandaza	(Scotland) St Johnstone	Free	
3 January 2012	DF	(England) Steve Cook	(England) Bournemouth	Undisclosed	
Players loaned in
Date from	Pos.	Name	From	Date to	Ref.
16 July 2011	MF	(Democratic Republic of the Congo) Kazenga LuaLua	(England) Newcastle United	January 2012	
21 October 2011	DF	(Chile) Gonzalo Jara	(England) West Bromwich Albion	20 December 2011(recalled)	
24 October 2011	GK	(England) Steve Harper	(England) Newcastle United	November 2011	
30 January 2012	FW	(Wales) Sam Vokes	(England) Wolverhampton Wanderers	June 2012	
31 January 2012	DF	(Chile) Gonzalo Jara	(England) West Bromwich Albion	June 2012	
31 January 2012	DF	(England) Joe Mattock	(England) West Bromwich Albion	June 2012	
17 February 2012	MF	(Israel) Gai Assulin	(England) Manchester City	May 2012	
17 February 2012	MF	(Ivory Coast) Abdul Razak	(England) Manchester City	May 2012	
Players loaned out
Date from	Pos.	Name	To	Date to	Ref.
1 January 2012	GK	(England) Michael Poke	(England) Bristol Rovers	1 February 2012	
