= 2009–10 Brighton & Hove Albion F.C. season =

108th season in existence of Brighton & Hove Albion

Brighton & Hove Albion
2009–10 season
- Manager: Russell Slade (until 1 November); Gus Poyet (from 10 November)
- Stadium: Withdean Stadium
- Football League One: 13th
- FA Cup: Fourth round
- League Cup: First round
- Football League Trophy: Second round
- Top goalscorer: Nicky Forster (16)
Home colours	Away colours	Third colours

During the 2009–10 English football season, Brighton & Hove Albion F.C. competed in Football League One.

== Season summary ==
After a run of three wins from the opening fifteen games, Albion found themselves in 20th place and above the relegation zone only on goal difference. As a result, boss Russell Slade was sacked on 1 November 2008, to be replaced by former Chelsea midfielder Gus Poyet, after Steve Coppell had rejected the chance to manage the club for a second time. Poyet guided Brighton away from the relegation zone, finishing the season in 13th place.

Brighton reached the fourth round of the FA Cup, being beaten by eventual semi-finalists Aston Villa. In the League Cup, Brighton were eliminated in the first round by Championship side Swansea City. The Seagulls were also knocked out of the Football League Trophy at the same stage they entered; in the Southern area second round they were defeated by Leyton Orient.

== Competitions ==
=== League One ===
==== Results ====
8 August 2009	Brighton & Hove Albion	0–1	Walsall	Brighton
15:00		Report	Whing 30' (own goal)	Stadium: Withdean Stadium; Attendance: 6,504; Referee: Jarmail Singh

15 August 2009	Brentford	0–0	Brighton & Hove Albion	Brentford
15:00		Report		Stadium: Griffin Park; Attendance: 6,950; Referee: Trevor Kettle

18 August 2009	Huddersfield Town	7–1	Brighton & Hove Albion	Huddersfield
19:45	Kay 21'; Clarke 35'; Novak 43' (pen.); Roberts 64'; Drinkwater 64'; Robinson 73', 90'	Report	Dickinson 34'; Kuipers (red card) 39'	Stadium: Galpharm Stadium; Attendance: 11,269; Referee: Neil Swarbrick

22 August 2009	Brighton & Hove Albion	2–4	Stockport County	Brighton
15:00	Forster 28'; Dickinson 59'; Elphick (red card) 62'; Hawkins (red card) 65'	Report	Baker 30', 54', 66' (pen.); Bridcutt (red card) 84'; Johnson 89'	Stadium: Withdean Stadium; Attendance: 5,270; Referee: Steve Cook

28 August 2009	Millwall	1–1	Brighton & Hove Albion	Bermondsey
19:45	Price 6'	Report	Forster 70'	Stadium: The Den; Attendance: 10,138; Referee: Andy Penn

5 September 2009	Brighton & Hove Albion	1–0	Wycombe Wanderers	Brighton
15:00	Forster 75'	Report		Stadium: Withdean Stadium; Attendance: 5,895; Referee: Gavin Ward

12 September 2009	Carlisle United	0–2	Brighton & Hove Albion	Carlisle
15:00		Report	Forster 8', 66'	Stadium: Brunton Park; Attendance: 5,368; Referee: Andy Haines

19 September 2009	Brighton & Hove Albion	2–3	Southend United	Brighton
15:00	Forster 21', 40'	Report	Barnard 8'; O'Donovan 27'; Laurent 90'	Stadium: Withdean Stadium; Attendance: 6,287; Referee: Roger East

26 September 2009	Bristol Rovers	1–1	Brighton & Hove Albion	Brighton
15:00	Kuffour 68'	Report	Virgo (red card) 45'; Tunnicliffe 68'	Stadium: Memorial Stadium; Attendance: 8,098; Referee: Fred Graham

3 October 2009	Brighton & Hove Albion	0–1	MK Dons	Brighton
15:00	El-Abd (red card) 26'	Report	Easter 49'	Stadium: Withdean Stadium; Attendance: 6,419; Referee: Paul Taylor

10 October 2009	Yeovil Town	2–2	Brighton & Hove Albion	Yeovil
15:00	Murray 45', 82' (pen.)	Report	Crofts 6'; Dickinson 41'	Stadium: Huish Park; Attendance: 4,412; Referee: Oliver Langford

13 October 2009	Brighton & Hove Albion	2–0	Gillingham	Brighton
19:45	Bennett 74'; Elphick 78'	Report		Stadium: Withdean Stadium; Attendance: 5,960; Referee: Graham Scott

17 October 2009	Tranmere Rovers	2–1	Brighton & Hove Albion	Birkenhead
15:00	Edds 36'; Welsh 66'	Report	Murray 78' (pen.) (red card) 82'	Stadium: Prenton Park; Attendance: 5,250; Referee: Jock Waugh

24 October 2009	Brighton & Hove Albion	0–2	Oldham Athletic	Brighton
15:00		Report	Abbott 57'; Hazell 81'	Stadium: Withdean Stadium; Attendance: 6,205; Referee: Dean Whitestone

31 October 2009	Brighton & Hove Albion	3–3	Hartlepool United	Brighton
15:00	Dickinson 27'; Forster 39', 48'	Report	Boyd 6'; Monkhouse 43'; Jones 45'	Stadium: Withdean Stadium; Attendance: 5,694; Referee: Pat Miller

15 November 2009	Southampton	1–3	Brighton & Hove Albion	Southampton
16:30	Lambert 43' (pen.)	Report	Murray 16', 22'; Crofts 86'	Stadium: St Mary's Stadium; Attendance: 21,932; Referee: Kevin Friend

21 November 2009	Brighton & Hove Albion	0–3	Leeds United	Brighton
15:00		Report	Snodgrass 27'; Beckford 43'; Kilkenny 90'	Stadium: Withdean Stadium; Attendance: 7,615; Referee: James Linington

24 November 2009	Norwich City	4–1	Brighton & Hove Albion	Norwich
19:45	Holt 22'; Hoolahan 22'; Elphick 69' (own goal); Martin 82'	Report	Tunnicliffe 61'	Stadium: Carrow Road; Attendance: 24,670; Referee: Keith Hill

1 December 2009	Brighton & Hove Albion	0–2	Charlton Athletic	Brighton
19:45		Report	Burton 29'; Wagstaff 37'	Stadium: Withdean Stadium; Attendance: 6,769; Referee: Gavin Ward

5 December 2009	Exeter City	0–1	Brighton & Hove Albion	Exeter
15:00		Report	Crofts 90'	Stadium: St. James' Park; Attendance: 5,456; Referee: Rob Shoebridge

11 December 2009	Brighton & Hove Albion	1–2	Colchester United	Brighton
19:45	Dicker 42'	Report	Ifil 9'; Wordsworth 14'	Stadium: Withdean Stadium; Attendance: 5,898; Referee: Steve Tanner

19 December 2009	Swindon Town	2–1	Brighton & Hove Albion	Swindon
15:00	Paynter 31'; Austin 54' (pen.)	Report	Forster 38'	Stadium: County Ground; Attendance: 7,068; Referee: Jonathan Moss

26 December 2009	Brighton & Hove Albion	0–0	Leyton Orient	Brighton
13:00	Crofts (red card) 70'	Report		Stadium: Withdean Stadium; Attendance: 6,690; Referee: Phil Crossley

28 December 2009	Wycombe Wanderers	2–5	Brighton & Hove Albion	High Wycombe
15:00	Pittman 27'; Mousinho 40'	Report	Murray 36', 56', 70', 80'; Forster 49'	Stadium: Adams Park; Attendance: 6,126; Referee: Steve Cook

16 January 2010	Walsall	1–2	Brighton & Hove Albion	Walsall
15:00	Richards 26'	Report	Murray 8'; Forster 37'	Stadium: Bescot Stadium; Attendance: 3,450; Referee: Graham Horwood

26 January 2010	Stockport County	1–1	Brighton & Hove Albion	Stockport
19:45	Pilkington 58'	Report	Crofts 90'	Stadium: Edgeley Park; Attendance: 3,636; Referee: Peter Quinn

30 January 2010	Brighton & Hove Albion	0–1	Millwall	Brighton
15:00		Report	Morison 49'	Stadium: Withdean Stadium; Attendance: 6,610; Referee: Kevin Friend

6 February 2010	Leyton Orient	1–1	Brighton & Hove Albion	Leyton, London
15:00	McGleish 53'	Report	Murray 10'	Stadium: Brisbane Road; Attendance: 6,027; Referee: Steve Cook

9 February 2010	Brighton & Hove Albion	0–0	Huddersfield Town	Brighton
19:45		Report		Stadium: Withdean Stadium; Attendance: 4,711; Referee: Steve Bratt

13 February 2010	Brighton & Hove Albion	1–2	Norwich City	Brighton
15:00	Bennett 21'	Report	Holt 80'; Doherty 84'	Stadium: Withdean Stadium; Attendance: 7,258; Referee: Dean Whitestone

20 February 2010	Leeds United	1–1	Brighton & Hove Albion	Leeds
15:00	Snodgrass 90'	Report	Murray 77'; Virgo (red card) 81'	Stadium: Elland Road; Attendance: 24,120; Referee: Carl Boyeson

23 February 2010	Charlton Athletic	1–2	Brighton & Hove Albion	Charlton, London
19:45	Sodje 90'	Report	Calderón 36'; Bennett 78'	Stadium: The Valley; Attendance: 17,508; Referee: Andy D'Urso

27 February 2010	Brighton & Hove Albion	2–0	Exeter City	Brighton
15:00	Elphick 26'; Dicker 49'	Report		Stadium: Withdean Stadium; Attendance: 6,952; Referee: Steven Rushton

8 March 2010	Colchester United	0–0	Brighton & Hove Albion	Colchester
19:45		Report		Stadium: Colchester Community Stadium; Attendance: 3,914; Referee: Anthony Bates

13 March 2010	Brighton & Hove Albion	0–1	Swindon Town	Brighton
15:00		Report	Austin 69'	Stadium: Withdean Stadium; Attendance: 6,946; Referee: Grant Hegley

16 March 2010	Brighton & Hove Albion	3–0	Brentford	Brighton
19:45	Murray 33'; Virgo 90'; Forster 90'	Report	Bennett (red card) 90'	Stadium: Withdean Stadium; Attendance: 5,539; Referee: Danny McDermid

20 March 2010	Oldham Athletic	0–2	Brighton & Hove Albion	Oldham
15:00		Report	Bennett 40'; Worthington 57' (own goal)	Stadium: Boundary Park; Attendance: 4,059; Referee: David Webb

27 March 2010	Brighton & Hove Albion	3–0	Tranmere Rovers	Brighton
15:00	Murray 7'; Crofts 30'; Barnes 81'	Report	Robinson 78'	Stadium: Withdean Stadium; Attendance: 6,812; Referee: Paul Taylor

1 April 2010	Brighton & Hove Albion	2–2	Southampton	Brighton
19:45	Bennett 12'; Barnes 66'	Report	Hammond 41'; Barnard 89'	Stadium: Withdean Stadium; Attendance: 7,784; Referee: Steve Tanner

5 April 2010	Hartlepool United	2–0	Brighton & Hove Albion	Hartlepool
15:00	O'Donovan 54'; Monkhouse 70'	Report		Stadium: Victoria Park; Attendance: 3,466; Referee: Mark Haywood

10 April 2010	Brighton & Hove Albion	1–2	Carlisle United	Brighton
15:00	Elphick 85'	Report	Harte 33'; Madine 88'	Stadium: Withdean Stadium; Attendance: 6,673; Referee: Kevin Wright

13 April 2010	Gillingham	1–1	Brighton & Hove Albion	Gillingham
19:45	Miller 49'; Gowling (red card) 86'	Report	El-Abd 5'	Stadium: Priestfield Stadium; Attendance: 7,977; Referee: James Linington

17 April 2010	Southend United	0–1	Brighton & Hove Albion	Southend-on-Sea
15:00		Report	Barnes 15'	Stadium: Roots Hall; Attendance: 8,503; Referee: Simon Hooper

24 April 2010	Brighton & Hove Albion	2–1	Bristol Rovers	Brighton
15:00	Barnes 17'; Murray (red card) 71'; Bennett 90' (pen.)	Report	Williams 17'; Coles (red card) 78'	Stadium: Withdean Stadium; Attendance: 6,922; Referee: Christopher Sarginson

1 May 2010	MK Dons	0–0	Brighton & Hove Albion	Milton Keynes
15:00	Rae (red card) 45'	Report	Arismendi (red card) 45'	Stadium: Stadium MK; Attendance: 12,023; Referee: Oliver Langford

8 May 2010	Brighton & Hove Albion	1–0	Yeovil Town	Brighton
15:00	Bennett 44'	Report		Stadium: Withdean Stadium; Attendance: 7,323; Referee: Steve Tanner

=== Football League Cup ===
As with all League One sides, Brighton & Hove Albion entered the Football League Cup in the first round.

11 August 2009 First round	Swansea City	3–0	Brighton & Hove Albion	Swansea
19:45	Monk 17'; Dobbie 60', 90+3'	Report		Stadium: Liberty Stadium; Attendance: 6,400; Referee: Scott

=== Football League Trophy ===
Brighton & Hove Albion received a bye to the second round, where they competed in the Southern section.

6 October 2009 Southern Section second round	Leyton Orient	1–0	Brighton & Hove Albion	Leyton, London
19:45	Patulea 89'	Report		Stadium: Matchroom Stadium; Attendance: 1,457; Referee: Hegley

=== FA Cup ===
As Brighton were playing in League One, they entered the FA Cup in the first round proper.

7 November 2009 First round	Wycombe Wanderers	4–4	Brighton & Hove Albion	High Wycombe
15:00	Harrold 18' (pen.), 70'; Davies 38'; Pittman 61'; Woodman (red card)	Report	Bennett 3'; Forster 45+3' (pen.); Murray 51', 83' (pen.); Hoyte (red card)	Stadium: Adams Park; Attendance: 2,749; Referee: Simon Hooper

18 November 2009 First round replay	Brighton & Hove Albion	2–0	Wycombe Wanderers	Brighton
19:45	Crofts 36'; Bennett 61'	Report		Stadium: Withdean Stadium; Attendance: 3,383; Referee: Andy D'Urso

28 November 2009 Second round	Brighton & Hove Albion	3–2	Rushden & Diamonds	Brighton
15:00	Dickinson 3', 86'; Forster 22' (pen.)	Report	Tomlin 14'; O'Connor 40'	Stadium: Withdean Stadium; Attendance: 3,638; Referee: Phil Gibbs

2 January 2010 Third round	Torquay United	0–1	Brighton & Hove Albion	Torquay
15:00		Report	Crofts 77'	Stadium: Plainmoor; Attendance: 4,028; Referee: Jimmy Russell

23 January 2010 Fourth round	Aston Villa	3–2	Brighton & Hove Albion	Birmingham
15:00	Delfouneso 5'; Young 48'; Delph 63'	Report	Elphick 41'; Forster 90+1'	Stadium: Villa Park; Attendance: 39,725; Referee: Taylor

== Players ==
=== First-team squad ===
Squad at end of season

Note: Flags indicate national team as defined under FIFA eligibility rules; some limited exceptions apply. Players may hold more than one non-FIFA nationality.

No.	Pos.	Nation	Player
1	GK	NED	Michel Kuipers
2	DF	ENG	Andy Whing
3	DF	SCO	Jimmy McNulty (Note: McNulty was born in Runcorn, England, but also qualified to represent Scotland internationally and has represented them at U-17 and U-19 level.)
4	DF	ENG	Tommy Elphick
6	DF	EGY	Adam El-Abd (Note: El-Abd was born in Brighton, England, but also qualified to represent Egypt internationally through his father and declared internationally for Egypt in 2005 before making his international debut for Egypt in May 2012.)
7	MF	ENG	Dean Cox
8	MF	ENG	Alan Navarro
9	FW	ENG	Nicky Forster
10	FW	ENG	Liam Dickinson
11	MF	COD	Kazenga LuaLua (on loan from Newcastle United)
12	DF	ENG	James Tunnicliffe
13	GK	ENG	Mitch Walker
14	MF	URU	Diego Arismendi (on loan from Stoke City)
15	FW	ENG	Gary Hart
16	DF	IRL	Colin Hawkins
17	FW	ENG	Glenn Murray
18	MF	IRL	Gary Dicker
19	DF	ESP	Iñigo Calderón

No.	Pos.	Nation	Player
20	MF	WAL	Andrew Crofts (Note: Crofts was born in Chatham, England, but also qualified to represent Wales internationally through a grandparent and represented Wales at U-19 and U-21 level before making his international debut for Wales in 2005.)
21	MF	FRA	Sébastien Carole
22	DF	IRL	Marcos Painter (Note: Painter was born in Solihull, England, but also qualified to represent the Republic of Ireland internationally and has represented them at U-21 level.) (on loan from Swansea City)
23	DF	SCO	Adam Virgo (Note: Virgo was born in Brighton, England, but also qualified to represent Scotland internationally and has represented them at B level.)
24	MF	ENG	Jamie Smith
26	MF	ENG	Elliott Bennett (Note: Bennett was born in Telford, England, but also qualified to represent Jamaica internationally through his paternal grandparents and was called up by Jamaica in February 2015 without playing.)
27	DF	ENG	Gavin Hoyte (Note: Hoyte was born in Waltham Forest, England, and represented them at every age level between U-17 and U-20 level, but also qualified to represent Trinidad and Tobago internationally and would make his international debut for Trinidad and Tobago in May 2014.)
28	FW	ENG	George Barker
29	GK	SVK	Peter Brezovan
30	DF	ENG	Steve Cook
31	GK	ENG	Josh Pelling
32	MF	ENG	Steve Brinkhurst
33	FW	ENG	Chris Holroyd
34	MF	ENG	Lee Hendrie (on loan from Derby County)
35	GK	ENG	Danny Naisbitt (on loan from Histon)
36	FW	AUT	Ashley Barnes (Note: Barnes was born in Bath, England, but also qualified to represent Austria internationally through his grandmother and represented Austria at U-20 level.) (on loan from Plymouth Argyle)
37	DF	ENG	Lewis Dunk
38	MF	ENG	Jake Forster-Caskey

=== Left club during season ===
Note: Flags indicate national team as defined under FIFA eligibility rules; some limited exceptions apply. Players may hold more than one non-FIFA nationality.

No.	Pos.	Nation	Player
5	DF	ENG	Jake Wright (on loan from Oxford United)
11	MF	ENG	Kevin McLeod (to Wycombe Wanderers)
14	MF	ENG	David Livermore (to Barnet)
19	MF	ENG	Mark Wright (to Bristol Rovers)
19	MF	WAL	Arron Davies (on loan to Yeovil Town)

No.	Pos.	Nation	Player
21	MF	ENG	Matt Thornhill (on loan from Nottingham Forest)
22	GK	SCO	Graeme Smith (to Hibernian)
25	FW	WAL	Craig Davies (Note: Davies was born in Burton upon Trent, England, but also qualified to represent Wales internationally through a grandparent and represented Wales at U-17, U-19 and U-21 level before making his international debut for Wales in August 2005.) (on loan to Port Vale)
33	MF	ENG	Lewis Ide (to Bognor Regis Town)

== Kit ==
Brighton's kit was manufactured by Italian supplier Erreà and sponsored by It First.
