= Elphick =

Elphick is a surname. Notable people with the surname include:

- Alice Elphick (1921–2008), Australian nun
- Gary Elphick (born 1985), British footballer
- Gladys Elphick (1904–1988), Australian Aboriginal activist
- Jonathan Elphick (born 1945), British writer
- Michael Elphick (1946–2002), British actor
- Roberto Valenzuela Elphick (1873–?), British-Chilean bishop
- Tommy Elphick (born 1987), British footballer

== See also ==
- David Elfick (born 20 December 1944), Australian film writer and director
- Elphicke, surname
