= Elphicke =

Elphicke is a surname. Notable people with the surname include:

- Charlie Elphicke (born 1971), British politician, former solicitor, and convicted criminal
- Natalie Elphicke (born 1970), British politician and finance lawyer

== See also ==
- Elphick
