= Jake Forster-Caskey =

English footballer

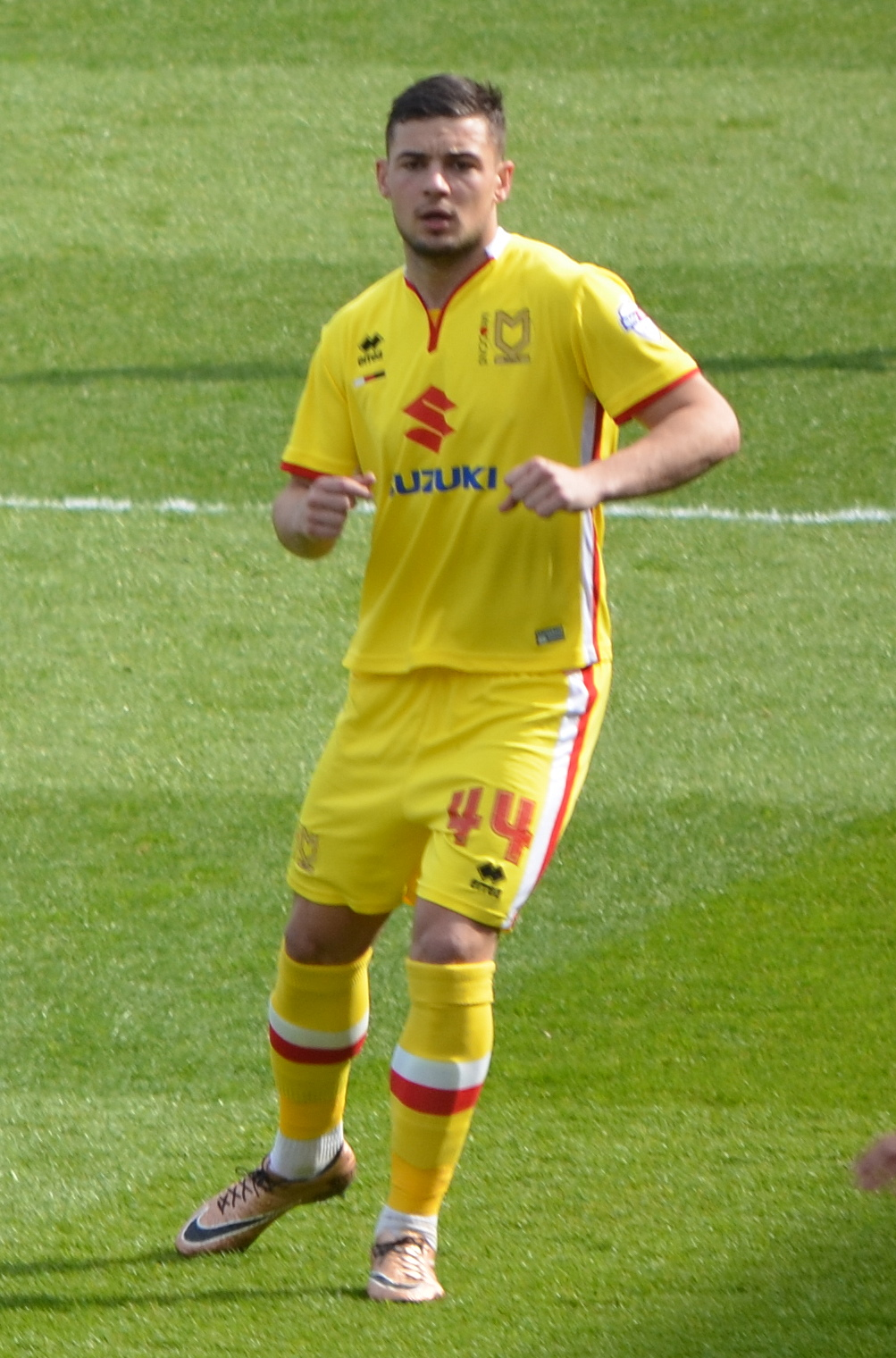
- Forster-Caskey playing for Milton Keynes Dons in 2016

Personal information
- Full name: Jake Dane Forster-Caskey
- Date of birth: 25 April 1994 (age 32)
- Place of birth: Southend-on-Sea, England
- Height: 5 ft 10 in (1.78 m)
- Position: Central midfielder

Team information
- Current team: Woking
- Number: 25

Youth career
- 2007–2012: Brighton & Hove Albion

Senior career*
Years	Team	Apps	(Gls)
2009–2017	Brighton & Hove Albion	67	(5)
2012–2013	→ Oxford United (loan)	16	(3)
2015	→ Milton Keynes Dons (loan)	5	(0)
2016	→ Milton Keynes Dons (loan)	15	(1)
2016–2017	→ Rotherham United (loan)	6	(0)
2017–2023	Charlton Athletic	109	(13)
2023–2025	Stevenage	53	(2)
2025–	Woking	39	(0)

International career^{‡}
2010	England U16	2	(0)
2010–2011	England U17	17	(1)
2011	England U18	1	(0)
2014	England U20	5	(1)
2014–2015	England U21	14	(0)
- * Club domestic league appearances and goals as of 20:16, 22 November 2026 (UTC) ‡ National team caps and goals as of 10:14, 30 January 2017 (UTC)

Jake Dane Forster-Caskey (born 25 April 1994) is an English professional footballer who plays as a central midfielder for National League club Woking.

He is the son of former professional player Darren Caskey and is the stepson of the former striker Nicky Forster. Forster-Caskey has represented England at under-16, under-17, under-18 and under-21 level.

== Club career ==
=== Brighton & Hove Albion ===
Forster-Caskey joined Brighton's youth team in 2007. On 30 April 2010, he was offered a scholarship deal with Brighton & Hove Albion. It was later revealed that Forster-Caskey rejected interest from Premier League clubs Arsenal and Aston Villa before signing with Brighton.

The following day, Forster-Caskey was named as an unused substitute during the 0–0 draw away to Milton Keynes Dons. After a man-of-the-match performance during the Sussex Senior Cup final, whilst scoring twice during a 4–0 victory over Bognor Regis Town, Forster-Caskey was once again named as a substitute for Brighton's final game of the 2009–10 season against Yeovil Town. During the match, he became the youngest player to feature in the Brighton first team when he made his debut as a substitute in the 76th minute. Forster-Caskey made his second substitute appearance for Brighton during the 3–0 defeat to Stoke City in the 5th round of the FA Cup on 19 February 2011. He made his full first-team debut, and scored his first Brighton goal, during the Seagulls' 3–0 win over Southampton on 2 January 2012. He scored the opening goal for Brighton, and was named Man of the Match. In his next game, Forster-Caskey again scored and received Man of the Match in an FA Cup tie with Wrexham. In all, Forster-Caskey made 6 appearances during the 2011–12 season, scoring 2 goals. On 21 June 2012, Forster-Caskey signed a new deal, keeping him at the club until 2015.

==== Oxford United (loan) ====
In July 2012, Forster-Caskey signed a six-month loan deal with League Two club Oxford United. He scored on his debut, a 20-yard left-footed strike, in a 2–0 win over Bristol Rovers. He scored his second goal on 8 September, in a 4–2 defeat at home to Exeter City. His third and final goal for Oxford came against Wimbledon, a 20-yard free kick into the top corner. In total he made 16 league appearances for Oxford before his loan spell concluded on 1 January 2013.

==== Milton Keynes Dons (loan) ====
On 22 September 2015, Forster-Caskey joined Championship side Milton Keynes Dons on an initial five-week emergency loan deal. On 26 September 2015 he made his debut for the club in the 1–3 home defeat to Derby County.

On 8 January 2016, Forster-Caskey rejoined the club on loan for the remainder of the 2015–16 season. On 13 February 2016, he scored his first goal for the club, scoring direct from a free-kick in a 0–1 away win against Derby County.

==== Rotherham United (loan) ====
He joined Rotherham United on 20 July 2016 on a season-long loan deal. The deal was mutually terminated by Rotherham and parent club Brighton on 5 January 2017, after he had made seven appearances for the Millers.

=== Charlton Athletic ===
On 5 January 2017, Forster-Caskey joined Charlton Athletic, signing a 2 1/2-year contract.

He was out of the squad for most of the 2018–19 season with an anterior cruciate knee ligament injury. He was an unusued substitute in the play-off final as Charlton defeated Sunderland 2–1 to win promotion back to the championship. He was offered a new contract by Charlton at the end of the 2018–19 season. He signed a new one-year contract in June 2019. On 10 May 2021, Forster-Caskey was awarded Charlton's Player of the Year for the 2020–21 season.

On 5 July 2021, Forster-Caskey signed a new one-year deal with the club ahead of the 2021–22 season.

=== Stevenage ===
On 3 January 2023, Forster-Caskey signed for League Two club Stevenage.

He departed the club upon the expiration of his contract at the end of the 2024–25 season.

=== Woking ===
On 26 August 2025, Forster-Caskey agreed to join National League side, Woking on a one-year deal.

== International career ==
Forster-Caskey has represented the England under-16s, England under-17s, England under-18s and England under-20s national sides. He was announced as a member of the squad to feature in the annual Nordic under-17s tournament, commencing during August 2010. Forster-Caskey captained the England side as they recorded a 5–0 success over Finland in the first game of the tournament where he also scored his first international goal. He was also involved in the FA International Tournament, where he started in a 4–0 win over Australia, before substitute appearances in the 2–2 draw against Turkey and a 3–1 victory against Portugal.

During April 2011, Forster-Caskey was announced in the 18-man squad to represent England at the 2011 UEFA European Under-17 Championship in Serbia, commencing on 3 May. He made three appearances in the tournament for England before they were defeated 1–0 by Holland in the semi-final.

Forster-Caskey was also selected to represent England under-17s at the 2011 FIFA U-17 World Cup in Mexico. England won their group and reached the quarter-finals, where they lost 3–2 to Germany.

During October 2011, Forster-Caskey was selected for the England under-18 national side for a friendly against Slovakia, where he played 45 minutes before being substituted for Jordan Lussey at half-time.

Forster-Caskey was named in the initial 35-man squad for the 2013 Fifa Under 20 World Cup on 17 May 2013 by manager Peter Taylor, but failed to make the final 21-man squad selected on 28 May.

During May 2014, Jake and fellow Brighton teammate Solomon March were called up to the under-21 squad for the U21 qualifier versus Wales and the 2014 Toulon Tournament. Jake made his debut for the U21s coming on as a late substitute in the 3–1 victory against Wales.

== Personal life ==
Until February 2011, Forster-Caskey was simply known as Jake Caskey before altering his surname to Forster-Caskey in homage to his stepfather Nicky Forster. In a brief explanation, Forster-Caskey stated "I did it out of respect for my stepdad – because he has been a great role model and parent to me. I have lived with him for the last ten years and he has been a huge influence on me."

== Career statistics ==
As of match played 21 November 2026

Appearances and goals by club, season and competition
Club	Season	League			FA Cup		League Cup		Other		Total	
Club	Season	Division	Apps	Goals	Apps	Goals	Apps	Goals	Apps	Goals	Apps	Goals
Brighton & Hove Albion	2009–10	League One	1	0	0	0	0	0	0	0	1	0
Brighton & Hove Albion	2010–11	League One	0	0	1	0	0	0	0	0	1	0
Brighton & Hove Albion	2011–12	Championship	4	1	2	1	0	0	0	0	6	2
Brighton & Hove Albion	2012–13	Championship	3	0	0	0	0	0	0	0	3	0
Brighton & Hove Albion	2013–14	Championship	28	3	4	0	1	0	1 (Note: Appearance in Championship play-offs)	0	34	3
Brighton & Hove Albion	2014–15	Championship	29	1	1	0	3	2	0	0	33	3
Brighton & Hove Albion	2015–16	Championship	2	0	0	0	2	1	0	0	4	1
Brighton & Hove Albion	2016–17	Championship	0	0	0	0	0	0	0	0	0	0
Brighton & Hove Albion	Total		67	5	8	1	6	3	1	0	82	9
Oxford United (loan)	2012–13	League Two	16	3	0	0	1	0	3 (Note: Appearance(s) in Football League / EFL Trophy)	0	20	3
Milton Keynes Dons (loan)	2015–16	Championship	20	1	3	0	0	0	0	0	23	1
Rotherham United (loan)	2016–17	Championship	6	0	0	0	1	0	0	0	7	0
Charlton Athletic	2016–17	League One	15	2	0	0	0	0	0	0	15	2
Charlton Athletic	2017–18	League One	41	5	2	0	0	0	2 (Note: Appearances in League One play-offs)	0	45	5
Charlton Athletic	2018–19	League One	1	0	0	0	0	0	0	0	1	0
Charlton Athletic	2019–20	Championship	11	0	0	0	1	0	0	0	12	0
Charlton Athletic	2020–21	League One	34	6	1	0	1	0	2	0	38	6
Charlton Athletic	2021–22	League One	4	0	0	0	0	0	0	0	4	0
Charlton Athletic	2022–23	League One	3	0	2	0	4	0	4	0	13	0
Charlton Athletic	Total		109	13	5	0	6	0	8	0	128	13
Stevenage	2022–23	League Two	20	0	0	0	0	0	0	0	20	0
Stevenage	2023–24	League One	30	2	1	0	1	0	3	1	35	3
Stevenage	2024–25	League One	3	0	0	0	0	0	0	0	3	0
Stevenage	Total		53	2	1	0	1	0	3	1	58	3
Woking	2025–26	National League	30	0	2	2	—		2 (Note: One appearance in FA Trophy, One appearance in National League Cup)	0	34	2
Woking	2026–27	National League	9	0	0	0	—		2 (Note: One Appearance in National League Cup, One Appearance in Surrey Senior Cup)	0	11	0
Woking	Total		39	0	2	2	0	0	4	0	45	0
Career total			310	24	19	3	15	3	19	1	363	31

== Honours ==
Charlton Athletic

- EFL League One play-offs: 2019

Individual

- Charlton Athletic Player of the Year: 2020–21
