= Gary Elphick =

English footballer

Personal information
- Date of birth: 17 October 1985 (age 41)
- Place of birth: Brighton, England
- Position: Defender

Team information
- Current team: York City (first-team coach)

Senior career*
Years	Team	Apps	(Gls)
2004–2006	Brighton & Hove Albion	2	(0)
2004	→ Eastbourne Borough	1	(1)
2004–2005	→ St Albans City (loan)	18	(2)
2006	→ Aldershot Town (loan)	3	(0)
2006–2007	St Albans City	86	(7)
2007–2009	Havant & Waterlooville	75	(10)
2009–2012	Eastbourne Borough	79	(7)
2012	Eastleigh	19	(1)
2012–2013	Tonbridge Angels	70	(2)
2014–2015	Lewes	0	(0)
2015–2017	Worthing	72	(5)
2018–2019	Burgess Hill	24	(1)
2019–2023	Hastings United	51	(5)

Managerial career
- 2015–2017: Worthing
- 2021–2023: Hastings United
- * Club domestic league appearances and goals

Gary Elphick (born 17 October 1985) is an English former footballer who is a first-team coach at York City.

== Career ==
Elphick started his career at Brighton & Hove Albion, where he made two league appearances during two seasons. He had two loan spells whilst at Brighton, joining Eastbourne Borough in September 2004 scoring only one goal in just one game before returning to the Seagulls, he later joined Conference side Aldershot Town on loan in January 2006, playing just three games.

At the end of the 2005–06 season, he was released by Brighton and signed for newly promoted Football Conference side St Albans, the club was relegated at the end of the 2006–07 season, for which he was named as Player of the Year. Whilst playing for St Albans he has played for the England National Game XI. He played 16 games for St Albans.

In his time with St Albans City he made 84 appearances and scored seven goals. Nominated for the Saints Player of the Season 2006–07, he opted to leave the side in December 2007 to join Havant & Waterlooville where he quickly became a regular in the heart of the defence, playing all but two of the remaining league games of the season and picking up two Player of the Month awards in the process.

During the 2007–08 season, Elphick joined Conference South team Havant & Waterlooville, although the player was cup-tied and therefore ineligible to play in the FA Cup third round tie away at Liverpool.

In May 2009, he joined Conference National team Eastbourne Borough.

Elphick joined Eastleigh on 20 January 2012 for an undisclosed fee. He left the club in October 2012, following squad rearrangement by newly appointed manager Richard Hill. Elphick subsequently joined Tonbridge Angels.

After a spell at Lewes, Elphick joined Worthing as joint manager with Jon Meeney in June 2015, arriving as the replacement for Adam Hinshelwood.

On 6 March 2019, Elphick joined Hastings United and become first team manager in November 2021. Having guided the team to the Isthmian League South East Division title, followed by an eighth placed position in the Isthmian Premier, Elphick resigned at the end of the 2022–23 season.

== Coaching career ==
In June 2023, Elphick returned to Worthing as a coach.

On 27 February 2024, Elphick was appointed assistant manager of National League club York City, following Hinshelwood from Worthing. In August 2025, he remained at the club following Hinshelwood's departure in the role of first-team coach, supporting the newly appointed Stuart Maynard.

== Family ==
His younger brother, Tommy Elphick, was also a professional footballer.
