= Tommy Elphick =

English footballer

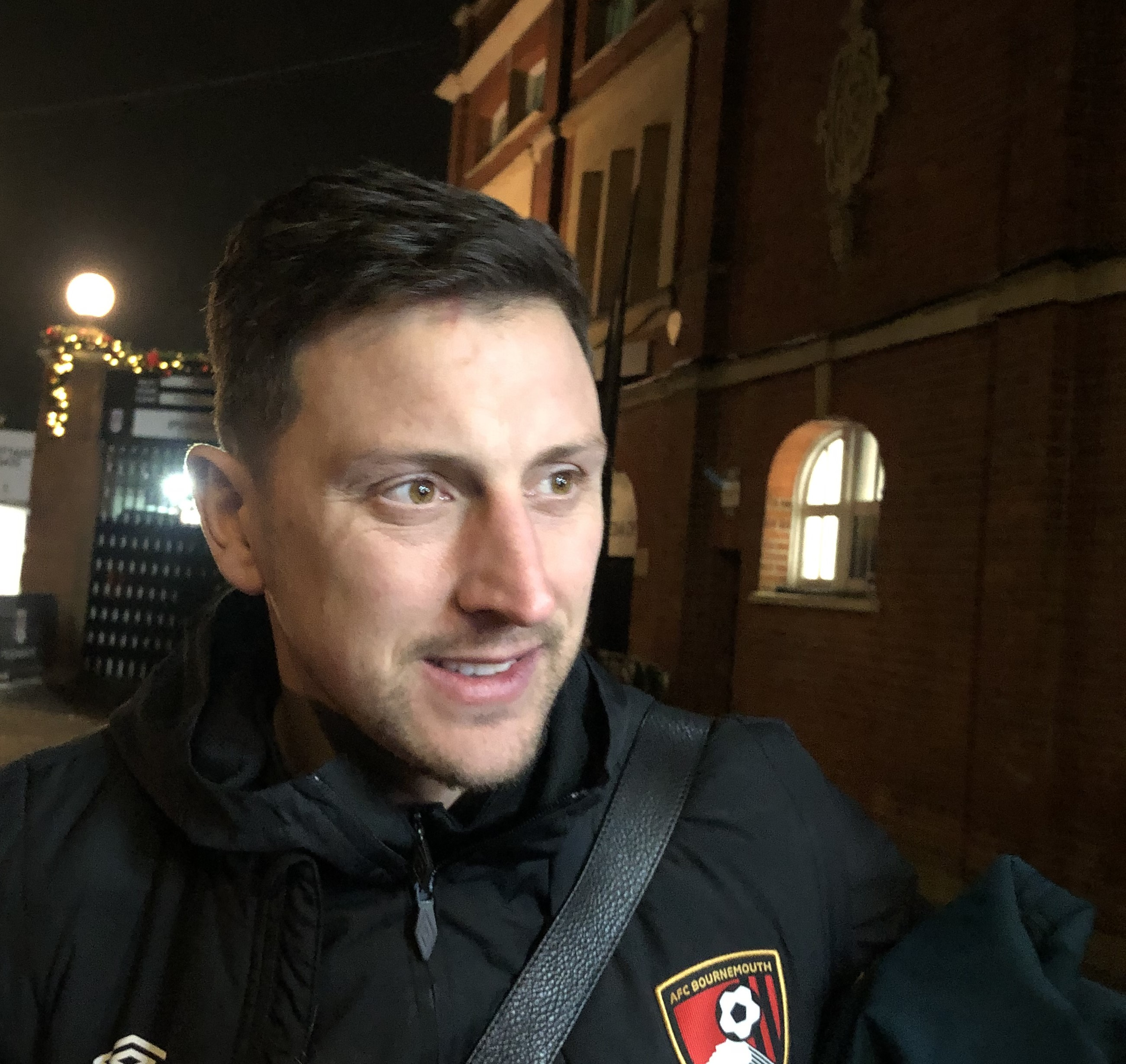
- Elphick in 2024

Personal information
- Full name: Tommy Elphick
- Date of birth: 7 September 1987 (age 39)
- Place of birth: Brighton, England
- Height: 6 ft 2 in (1.88 m)
- Position: Centre-back

Team information
- Current team: Liverpool (first-team coach)

Youth career
- Woodingdean
- –2005: Brighton & Hove Albion

Senior career*
Years	Team	Apps	(Gls)
2005–2012	Brighton & Hove Albion	153	(7)
2005	→ Bognor Regis Town (loan)	17	(1)
2012–2016	Bournemouth	142	(5)
2016–2019	Aston Villa	41	(1)
2018	→ Reading (loan)	4	(0)
2018	→ Hull City (loan)	18	(1)
2019–2021	Huddersfield Town	14	(0)
Total		389	(15)
- * Club domestic league appearances and goals as of 18:10, 4 October 2019 (UTC)

Tommy Elphick (born 7 September 1987) is an English professional football coach and former player who played as a centre-back. He is currently a first-team coach at Premier League club Liverpool.

Elphick started at the Brighton & Hove Albion academy and progressed through the ranks to be named first-team captain, leading the side to promotion to the Football League Championship in 2011. After moving to Bournemouth, he was again named captain and led the club to promotions to both the Championship and Premier League. He moved to Aston Villa in 2016, before finishing his playing career with Huddersfield Town. Elphick also played on loan with Bognor Regis Town, Reading and Hull City.

== Playing career ==
=== Brighton & Hove Albion ===
Born in Brighton, England, as a youngster he played for the youth side of local team Woodingdean, before joining Brighton & Hove Albion's youth academy. Elphick progressed through the youth ranks at Brighton & Hove Albion, alongside his brother Gary, and in 2004, he signed his first year apprentice at the club. Then on 25 April 2005 Tommy played along with his brother in a reserve match against Woking. At some point during his early Brighton & Hove Albion career, Elphick was loaned out to non–league side Bognor Regis Town.

It was not until 12 December 2005 that Elphick made his Brighton debut, when he played alongside his brother, who was sent–off during the match, and came on as a substitute for Leon Knight, in a 5–1 loss against Reading. Elphick's development at the youth ranks at the club resulted him being awarded a contract in the summer of 2006.

The 2006–07 season changed for Elphick when his brother was released by the club at the end of the 2005–06 season. Having been told by Manager Mark McGhee that he won't be loaned out, due to defensive crisis and deemed "too inexperienced", it was not until on 7 April 2007 when Elphick made his first start in central defence, in a 2–0 loss against Doncaster Rovers. Elphick made another start on the last game of the season, in a 1–1 draw against Cheltenham Town.

In the 2007–08 season proved to be Elphick's breakthrough season at Brighton & Hove Albion and made his first appearance of the season, where he played 120 minutes in the first round of League Cup, in a 1–0 loss against Cardiff City. A few days later, Elphick was awarded a two–year contract extension at the club. The day after signing a contract with the club, Elphick made his first league appearance of the season, in a 2–1 win over Northampton Town. Elphick's impact in the first team and form earned him praise by Manager Dean Wilkins and formed a partnership throughout the season with Guy Butters and Joel Lynch. From 29 September 2007 to 13 October 2007, Elphick helped the club keep four successive clean sheet in four league matches. In a match against Hartlepool United on 27 October 2007, Elphick was involved in a clash with opposition striker Richie Barker and Barker accused Elphick of "besmirching the memory of" Michael Maidens, who died in a car crash weeks ago and following a conclusion to the investigation, he was cleared. However, Elphick suffered a hernia that required a surgery and was sidelined for three weeks, which was soon delayed for another week. Elphick made his return to the first team since returning from injury, in a 3–2 win over AFC Bournemouth, in which he stated the game left him bruised and battered. Two weeks later on 19 January 2008, Elphick scored his first professional goal (and his first for the club), in a 1–1 draw against Huddersfield Town. Elphick then scored his second goal of the season on 4 March 2008, in a 4–2 win over Gillingham. In a match against Nottingham Forest on 24 March 2008, Elphick was given a captaincy armband after their captain Nicky Forster was substituted, which resulted a 0–0 draw, in which he said it was honour to wear the captain armband. Then on 11 April 2008, Elphick signed a contract with the club, keeping him until 2010. Elphick went on to finish the 2007–08 season, making 41 appearances and scoring twice in all competition and was considered to be one of Brighton's best players, winning the 2007–08 player of the season award.

Ahead of the 2008–09 season, Elphick vowed that he would not be a victim from second season syndrome and under the new management of Micky Adams, Elphick found himself in a centre–back partnership with new centre–back signing, Colin Hawkins following the departures of Lynch and Butters. In the second round of the League Cup, Elphick successfully converted his third penalty in the shoot–out against Premier League side Manchester City and went throughout to the next round after beating them 5–3 in the shoot–out when the game went into extra following a 2–2 draw. He became the first player at the club to be contracted to play at the club's new Falmer Stadium when he signed a new contract on 12 December 2008. Elphick then scored his first league goal, in a 1–1 draw against Northampton Town on 24 February 2009. Despite being suspended in October and injury, which he played with an injured ankle since December, Elphick finished the 2008–09 season, making 44 appearances and scoring twice in all competitions.

In the 2009–10 season, Elphick was in central–defence when the club conceded twelve goals in four matches and in a 4–2 loss against Stockport County on 22 August 2009, he was sent–off alongside Hawkins, in which newly Manager Russell Slade said Elphick's sending off was unlucky. After serving a one match suspension, Elphick returned to the first team, where he continued to be a regular. However, in a 3–2 loss against Southend United on 19 September 2009, Elphick was at fault when he gave away a ball to Francis Laurent, who scored a winning in the last minute. Because of this, Elphick's first team place became under threat under Slade, but continued to remain nevertheless. Elphick mended his mistake when he scored his first goal of the season on 19 October 2009, in a 2–0 win over Gillingham. The 2009–10 season also saw Elphick's performance lacking, like he previously did in the previous two seasons, but soon improved under the new management of Gus Poyet after Slade's sacking. Elphick scored in the fourth round of the FA Cup, in a 3–2 against Aston Villa and went to score two more league goals against Exeter City and Carlisle United. Elphick finished the 2009–10, making 49 appearances and scoring four times in all competitions.

In the 2010–11 season, Elphick started well when he helped the club make a winning start and scored his first goal for the club, in a 2–0 win over Plymouth Argyle on 21 September 2010. However, due to the performance of Gordon Greer and Adam El-Abd, Elphick struggled to regain in the starting eleven and spent most of the season on the substitute bench. Despite this, Elphick was determined to fight for his first team place at the club in hopes of earning a new contract. As the 2010–11 season progressed, Elphick was given a first chance and remained in the starting eleven towards the end. Manager Poyet praised Elphick for his attitude and handling the situation when he's on the substitute bench. With Brighton & Hove Albion promoted to the Championship, Elphick was in the squad in the last game of the season, in a 1–1 draw against Notts County, but in the second half, Elphick was involved in a collision that saw him stretchered off and was substituted as a result. After the game, it was announced that Elphick would be sidelined at the start of the season and finished the 2010–11 season, making 35 appearances and scoring once in all competition.

In the 2011–12 season, Elphick made no appearances for the club, as in October, Elphick was expected to miss out for the rest of the season after having a second operation. While rehabilitating on his injury, Elphick signed a contract extension with the club for another season in April. Ahead of the 2012–13 season, Elphick made his first appearance for the club in fourteen months, in a friendly match, in a 3–0 win over Lewes.

=== Bournemouth ===
On 10 August 2012, it was announced he would be joining Bournemouth, signing a three–year contract. The move was reported to be for a six-figure fee. Upon joining the club, Elphick was given a number 13 shirt ahead of a new season.

Elphick made his Bournemouth debut, in the opening game of the season, where he played 90 minutes and making his first start, in a 1–1 draw against Portsmouth. After being dropped for one match, Elphick then scored two goals in two matches between 25 August 2012 and 1 September 2012 against Preston North End and Sheffield United. Having made an impact, Elphick established himself in the starting eleven in the first team by forming a central defensive partnership with Miles Addison and then Steve Cook. Following Addison's injury, Elphick was appointed captain for the whole season and captained in handful of league appearances until in a match against MK Dons on 2 February 2013, Elphick was involved in a lunge with Ryan Lowe that saw both players off the pitch, with Elphick substituted and Lowe being sent–off; and Bournemouth went on to win 3–0. After the match, it was announced that Elphick was sidelined between two and three weeks after it was initially feared that the injury would be even worse, which subsequently delayed his return for four weeks. Despite stating he's willing to sit out of the squad in hopes of helping the club reach promotion to the Championship next season after spending two matches as unused substitute, Elphick made his return to the first team on 29 March 2013, in a 1–0 win over Colchester United. As the 2012–13 season progressed towards the end of the season, Elphick regained his first team place and helped the club reach promotion to the Championship next season. As a result of making an impact in his first season at Bournemouth, Elphick made thirty–nine appearances and scoring two times in all competition and in addition, he won five awards, including the Daily Echo 2012–13 player of the season award.

In the 2013–14 season, Elphick found himself in a competition with Cook and Elliott Ward, as well as, Manager Eddie Howe's squad rotation. By November, Elphick's appearance was restricted to five starts and four substitute, playing nine times and following Ward's injury, he made his all the way up to the starting line–up. Elphick then scored his first goal of the season in the third round of the FA Cup, in a 4–1 win over Burton Albion and scored again three months on 5 April 2014, in a 2–1 win over QPR. Elphick went on to finish the 2013–14 season, making forty–two appearances and scoring two times in all competition.

Ahead of the 2014–15 season, Elphick suffered a setback when he had a back problem during the 2013–14 season, but managed to recover from it. In the opening game of the season, Elphick started the season well when he set up one of the four goals, in a 4–0 win over Huddersfield Town. With good performance he made this season so far, Elphick was awarded with a new contract with the club, signing a two–year contract. The following month, on 9 November 2014, Elphick made his 100th league appearance for the club, in a 0–0 draw against Middlesbrough. Elphick then scored his first Bournemouth goal of the season on 17 January 2015, in a 2–0 win over Rotherham United. Elphick was ever present this season, making and captained 46 league appearances for the club and helping the club reach promotion to the Premier League for the first time. After helping the club winning promotion, Elphick was awarded the supporters' player of the year and credited Howe for the influence he made this season. In addition to helping the club promotion to the Premier League, Elphick became the first man player to captained the club to win two promotions.

In the 2015–16 season, Elphick made his first Premier League debut, making his first start in the opening game of the season, in a 1–0 loss against Aston Villa. Elphick continued to remain in the first team at the start of the season until he suffered ankle injury during a 4–3 win over West Ham United and was sidelined until the New Year. After recovering from injury in January, Elphick remained on the sidelines until he appeared as unused substitute, in a 0–0 draw against Watford on 27 February 2016. It wasn't until on 2 April 2016, where he came on as a substitute in the 68th minute, in a 4–0 loss to Manchester City. Two weeks later on 23 April 2016, Elphick scored his first Premier League goal, in a 4–1 loss against Chelsea. Elphick finished the 2015–16 season, making fourteen appearances and scoring once in all competitions.

Elphick began to attract interest from relegated side Aston Villa, but Bournemouth ruled out selling him. Despite this, Villa made a £3 million bid for Elphick, which was accepted. Upon leaving Bournemouth, Elphick said his four years at the club were the best of his career, while manager Howe called Elphick "his own inspiration", and an "incredible servant".

=== Aston Villa ===
On 20 June 2016, Elphick became Aston Villa's first signing after their relegation to the Championship, and the first signing at the club made by new manager Roberto Di Matteo and under new owner Tony Xia. Upon joining Villa, Elphick was given the number six shirt.

Ahead of the 2016–17 season, Elphick was appointed as the club's new captain. It came after the Birmingham Mail urged the club to appoint Elphick as captain, due to his inspiration towards his teammates and the way he connects well with the club's supporters. Elphick made his Aston Villa debut (as well as captain), in the opening game of the season, in a 1–0 loss against Sheffield Wednesday. He then scored an own goal, in a 1–1 draw against Newcastle United on 24 September 2016. He quickly established himself in the first team for the first two months until he suffered an injury in mid-October. After returning from injury, Elphick continued to regain his place in the first team until he was dropped from the first team by new manager Steve Bruce in mid-December. Because of this, he was among several players up for sale in the winter transfer window, in order to reduce the wage bills. Although the move never happened, he remained on the substitute bench for the rest of the season, as Bruce preferred the central-defensive partnership of Nathan Baker and James Chester, who also took his place as the captain as well, and mostly came on as a late substitute. Despite this, Elphick went on to make a total of 26 appearances in his first season at Aston Villa.

Ahead of the 2017–18 season, Elphick was linked a move away from Aston Villa, with local rivals Birmingham City, or Sunderland. However, Elphick remained at the club but continued to remain out of the first team under Steve Bruce. He made his first appearance of the season on 22 August 2017, starting the whole game as captain, in a 4–1 win over Wigan Athletic in the second round of the League Cup. However, in his second appearance, he was sent-off in the 58th minute for a foul on Patrick Bamford, in a 2–0 loss to Middlesbrough. Following injuries to some of the club's defenders in December 2017, he received a handful of first team appearances for the side.

Elphick scored his first goal for Aston Villa against Hull City on 6 August 2018.

==== Reading (loan) ====
On 29 January 2018, Elphick joined fellow Championship club Reading on loan, until the end of the 2017–18 season.

Elphick made his Reading debut when he came on as a substitute for Sone Aluko in a 3–1 win over Burton Albion, on 30 January 2018. However, he injured his knee 30 minutes into his second appearance for Reading, against Millwall on 3 February 2018, ruling him out for six weeks. After spending two months rehabilitating his knee, Elphick made returned to football on 28 April 2018, coming on as a substitute for Omar Richards in a 4–0 loss to Ipswich Town. He started the last game of the season against Cardiff City; a 0–0 draw ensured Reading's safety in the Championship.

==== Hull City (loan) ====
On 31 August 2018, Elphick moved to Hull City on a season-long loan. He made his debut on 15 September 2018, in a 2–0 home win against Ipswich Town. On 29 December 2018, Aston Villa recalled Elphick due to an injury crisis at the club.

He was released by Aston Villa at the end of the 2018–19 season, following the club's promotion to the Premier League.

=== Huddersfield Town ===
Following his departure from Aston Villa, on 15 June 2019 Elphick signed a two-year contract with Championship club Huddersfield Town. The club had been relegated from the Premier League the previous season. In November 2019, it was announced that Elphick would have surgery after suffering a knee injury. After making 15 league appearances for the club, he was released at the end of his contract, on 11 May 2021.

=== Retirement ===
Elphick confirmed his retirement from professional football on 18 August 2021, and suggested that he would move into a coaching role in the EFL.

== Coaching career ==
On 1 September 2021, it was announced that Elphick had taken on a position coaching the AFC Bournemouth development squad. In December 2022, he was promoted to the first-team coaching staff at AFC Bournemouth to assist head coach Gary O'Neil.

In May 2026, he rejected the opportunity to become manager at Bristol City.

On 2 July 2026, Elphick was appointed first-team coach at Liverpool.

== Personal life ==
His older brother Gary was released by Brighton at the end of the 2005–06 season and went on to play in non-league football. His father is a racehorse owner. Because of his father's interest, Elphick bought his first horse, which he called his "release from football". Despite being born and raised in Brighton, Elphick grew up supporting Liverpool. While playing for Bournemouth, Elphick was involved in a superstitious episode, when he was pictured clutching a goalpost pre–match but was not included in the match photo.

In January 2012, Elphick was among six footballers arrested following an allegation of a sexual assault. After being questioned by the police and released on bail, Elphick was informed that no charges were to be brought against him in relation to the allegation and he was eliminated from the enquiry. After being cleared, Elphick spoke out about being named in the media in an allegation of a sex attack and described feeling "sick to a stomach". The other footballers in the enquiry were all ultimately cleared in court of any wrongdoing.

On 4 June 2016, Elphick married his girlfriend, Hannah Kearney, having become engaged in August 2014. However, their honeymoon was short-lived: he cut it short to sign for Aston Villa.

Elphick, being the captain of Bournemouth during the club's first-ever promotion to the Premier League, was chosen to feature in a mural entitled "Bournemouth – A History of Shaping the Future", which is painted on a wall of a building in the Lansdowne area of Bournemouth.

== Career statistics ==
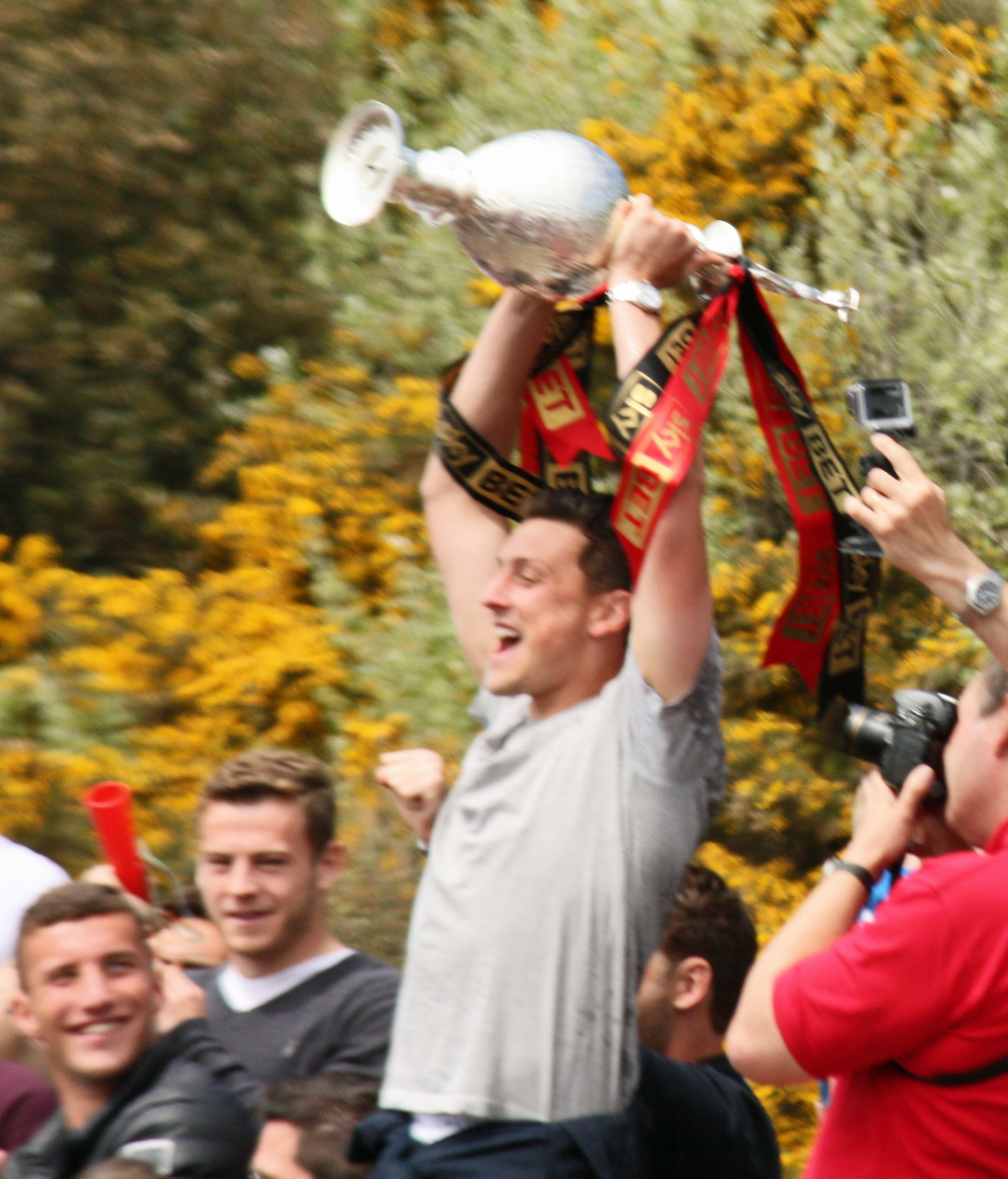
Elphick celebrating Bournemouth's promotion to the Premier League in 2015

As of 19 August 2021

Appearances and goals by club, season and competition
Club	Season	League			FA Cup		League Cup		Other		Total	
Club	Season	Division	Apps	Goals	Apps	Goals	Apps	Goals	Apps	Goals	Apps	Goals
Brighton & Hove Albion	2005–06	Championship	1	0	0	0	0	0	—		1	0
Brighton & Hove Albion	2006–07	League One	3	0	0	0	0	0	0	0	3	0
Brighton & Hove Albion	2007–08	League One	39	2	2	0	1	0	2 (Note: Appearances in Football League Trophy)	0	44	2
Brighton & Hove Albion	2008–09	League One	39	1	2	0	3	1	5	0	49	2
Brighton & Hove Albion	2009–10	League One	44	3	4	1	1	0	1	0	50	4
Brighton & Hove Albion	2010–11	League One	27	1	6	0	1	0	1	0	35	1
Brighton & Hove Albion	2011–12	Championship	0	0	0	0	0	0	—		0	0
Brighton & Hove Albion	Total		153	7	14	1	6	1	9	0	182	9
Bognor Regis Town (loan)	2005–06	Conference South	17	1	0	0	—		0	0	17	1
Bournemouth	2012–13	League One	34	2	4	0	0	0	1	0	39	2
Bournemouth	2013–14	Championship	35	1	2	1	2	0	—		39	2
Bournemouth	2014–15	Championship	46	1	1	0	3	0	—		50	1
Bournemouth	2015–16	Premier League	12	1	0	0	2	0	—		14	1
Bournemouth	Total		127	5	7	1	7	0	1	0	142	5
Aston Villa	2016–17	Championship	26	0	0	0	0	0	—		26	0
Aston Villa	2017–18	Championship	4	0	0	0	2	0	—		6	0
Aston Villa	2018–19	Championship	11	1	1	0	2	0	—		14	1
Aston Villa	Total		41	1	1	0	4	0	—		46	1
Reading (loan)	2017–18	Championship	4	0	0	0	0	0	—		4	0
Hull City (loan)	2018–19	Championship	18	1	0	0	0	0	—		18	1
Huddersfield Town	2019–20	Championship	14	0	0	0	0	0	—		14	0
Huddersfield Town	2020–21	Championship	0	0	0	0	0	0	—		0	0
Huddersfield Town	Total		14	0	0	0	0	0	—		14	0
Career total			345	14	22	2	17	1	10	0	394	16

== Honours ==
Brighton & Hove Albion

- Football League One: 2010–11

Bournemouth

- Football League Championship: 2014–15
- Football League One runner-up: 2012–13

Aston Villa

- EFL Championship play-offs: 2019
