= Jamie Smith (footballer, born 1989) =

English footballer

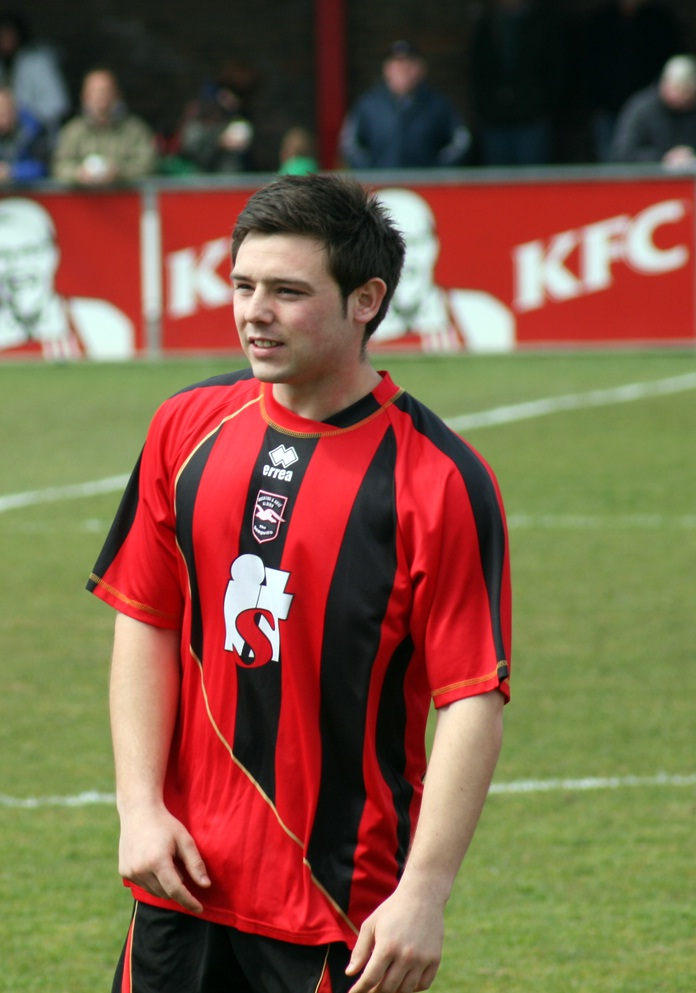

Personal information
- Full name: Jamie Peter Smith
- Date of birth: 12 September 1989 (age 37)
- Place of birth: Leytonstone, London, England
- Height: 5 ft 8 in (1.73 m)
- Position: Midfielder

Youth career
- 1997–1999: Interwood
- 1999–2008: Crystal Palace

Senior career*
Years	Team	Apps	(Gls)
2008–2009	Crystal Palace	0	(0)
2009–2012	Brighton & Hove Albion	24	(0)
2011–2012	Eastbourne Borough	3	(0)
2012	Leyton Orient	1	(0)
2012	Dover Athletic	13	(0)
2012–2013	Eastbourne Borough	22	(1)
2013–2015	Harlow Town	62	(14)
Total		125	(15)
- * Club domestic league appearances and goals

Jamie Peter Smith (born 16 September 1989) is an English former professional footballer who most recently played for Harlow Town.

== Career ==
Smith played for Walthamstow youth team Interwood. His former coach at Interwood, Trevor Bailey, brought him to Crystal Palace at the age of nine.

Smith progressed through the youth ranks at Crystal Palace and was awarded a one-year contract in the summer of 2008. After failing to make an appearance for Crystal Palace, Smith was released from the club in the summer of 2009. His former coach at Palace, Gary Issott, said; "Jamie Smith is a diminutive attacking central midfielder in the mould of Eyal Berkovic. He is very clever and improved after a frustrating first year. He started this season well and, up until Christmas, his form was electric."

On 3 August 2009, Smith signed a one-year contract with Brighton & Hove Albion after impressing during a trial with the club. Smith made his professional debut for Brighton during the 7–1 defeat to Huddersfield Town on 18 August 2009. He was substituted in the first half after goalkeeper Michel Kuipers was sent off; Smith made way for the replacement goalkeeper Graeme Smith.

Smith signed a six-month contract extension in May 2011 After being released by the Seagulls, Smith went on to train and eventually sign a contract until the end of the 2011–12 season with Leyton Orient. He made his only Orient appearance as a late substitute in the 3–0 defeat at Exeter City on 9 April 2012. On 15 May he was one of three players released by Orient manager Russell Slade.

Following a brief period at Dover Athletic, Smith joined Eastbourne Borough in November 2012.

== Honours ==
Brighton & Hove Albion

- Football League One: 2010–11
