= Agustín Battipiedi =

Argentine-Italian footballer

Personal information
- Full name: Agustín Emilio Battipiedi
- Date of birth: 1 September 1989 (age 37)
- Place of birth: Capital Federal, Argentina
- Height: 1.85 m (6 ft 1 in)
- Position: Midfielder

Team information
- Current team: Colegiales

Senior career*
| Years | Team | Apps | (Gls) |
| 2008–2010 | Comunicaciones | 50 | (3) |
| 2010–2011 | Brighton & Hove Albion | 18 | (0) |
| 2011–2012 | Dover Athletic | 11 | (1) |
| 2012–2013 | Brighton & Hove Albion | 0 | (0) |
| 2013 | Salisbury City | | |
| 2014 | Sariñena | | |
| 2014 | San Lorenzo | 16 | (0) |
| 2014–2015 | Imperia | 20 | (5) |
| 2016 | Fénix | 10 | (0) |
| 2016–2017 | Imperia | 20 | (6) |
| 2018-2019 | Marsala | 12 | (1) |
| 2018–2019 | Alassio FC | 11 | (2) |
| 2020–2021 | JJ Urquiza | 1 | (0) |
| 2021-2022 | Los Andes | 15 | (0) |
| 2022 | Colegiales | | |
- * Club domestic league appearances and goals as of 12:13, 23 May 2020 (UTC)

Agustín Battipiedi (born 1 September 1989) is an Argentine Italian professional footballer who plays for Colegiales.

Battipiedi can play as a midfielder and as a centre back. He was awarded twice as best young player in Argentina and has formerly played for English side Brighton & Hove Albion. He is now playing for Los Andes, Primera B Metropolitana team in Argentina.

== Career ==
His football career started in February 2008, after graduating from school. He joined Argentinian Primera B Metropolitana team, Club Comunicaciones. Making his professional debut in November 2008, at the age of 19, against Deportivo Español. Soon after he signed his first professional contract until June 2010. During his time there, he played 50 games scoring 3 goals. He was named Premio Revelación en fútbol de Ascenso by Argentine newspaper, Clarín, in 2010.

At the age of 20 Agustin was scouted and joined Brighton & Hove Albion after impressing Gus Poyet on a trip to Argentina. On 28 June 2010, Battipiedi along with fellow Argentinean Cristian Baz, signed one-year contracts with Brighton & Hove Albion after departing Argentine Third Division side Comunicaciones. He became part of a winning team that gained promotion from League One as champions, to The Championship.

For the season 2011-2012 he joined conference south side Dover Athletic, managed by Nicky Forster.

Battipiedi re-signed with Brighton & Hove Albion during the 2012–2013 season. In December 2013, he joined Conference Premier side Salisbury City on a non-contract basis.

After his time in England, he went to Spain to join Segunda B team, Sariñena, for the 2013–2014 season.

In March 2014, Agustin signed a one-year contract with Sportivo San Lorenzo, Paraguayan Second Division. Finishing in the second position, getting promoted to the top league.

Straight away, he was contracted by Imperia, a Football Conference National team in Italy, till June 2015, making a huge impact scoring 5 goals.

Soon after he joined Argentinian League One team, CA Fenix, until June 2016.

For the 2016–2017 season, he rejoined Italian team, Imperia, scoring 6 goals.

For the season 2018–2019, S.C. Marsala 1912 puts its eyes on him, and contracted Agustín. However, Alassio F.C. made a great move and got the player to join the club during the winter market till the end of the season.

In 2020, he went back to Argentina where he joined Asociación Social y Deportiva Justo José de Urquiza for a year and a half.

Battipiedi is now playing for Los Andes, Primera B Metropolitana team in Argentina.

In January 2022 Battipiedi signed for Colegiales, Primera B Metropolitana team in Argentina.

=== Awards ===
Individual and Team Honours

- 2014 Promoted to the Paraguayan top league, with Sportivo San Lorenzo.
- Football League One: 2010–11 with Brighton & Hove Albion
- 2010 Best Young Player Award – DIARIO CLARIN – Argentina
- 2008 Best Youth Player Award – Argentinian Football Association AFA.
