= Cristian Baz =

Argentine footballer

Personal information
- Full name: Cristian Martin Baz
- Date of birth: 5 May 1987 (age 39)
- Place of birth: Buenos Aires, Argentina
- Positions: Midfielder; striker

Senior career*
Years	Team	Apps	(Gls)
2008–2009	Olimpo	5	(1)
2009–2010	Comunicaciones	7	(3)
2010–2011	Brighton & Hove Albion	12	(4)
2012–2017	Club Mercedes	54	(14)
2017–2019	Wellington Olympic	18	(12)
- * Club domestic league appearances and goals as of 13 April 2011 (UTC)

Cristian Baz (born 5 May 1987) is an Argentinian professional footballer. Baz can play as a midfielder or as a striker.

== Career ==
On 28 June 2010, Baz, along with fellow Argentinean Agustín Battipiedi, signed one-year contracts with Brighton & Hove Albion after departing Argentine Third Division side Comunicaciones.

In May 2011, the club announced that he would be released at the end of the season following the ending of his current contract, along with five other players.

== Honours ==
Brighton & Hove Albion

- Football League One: 2010–11
