= Iñigo Calderón =

Spanish footballer (born 1982)

Íñigo Calderón
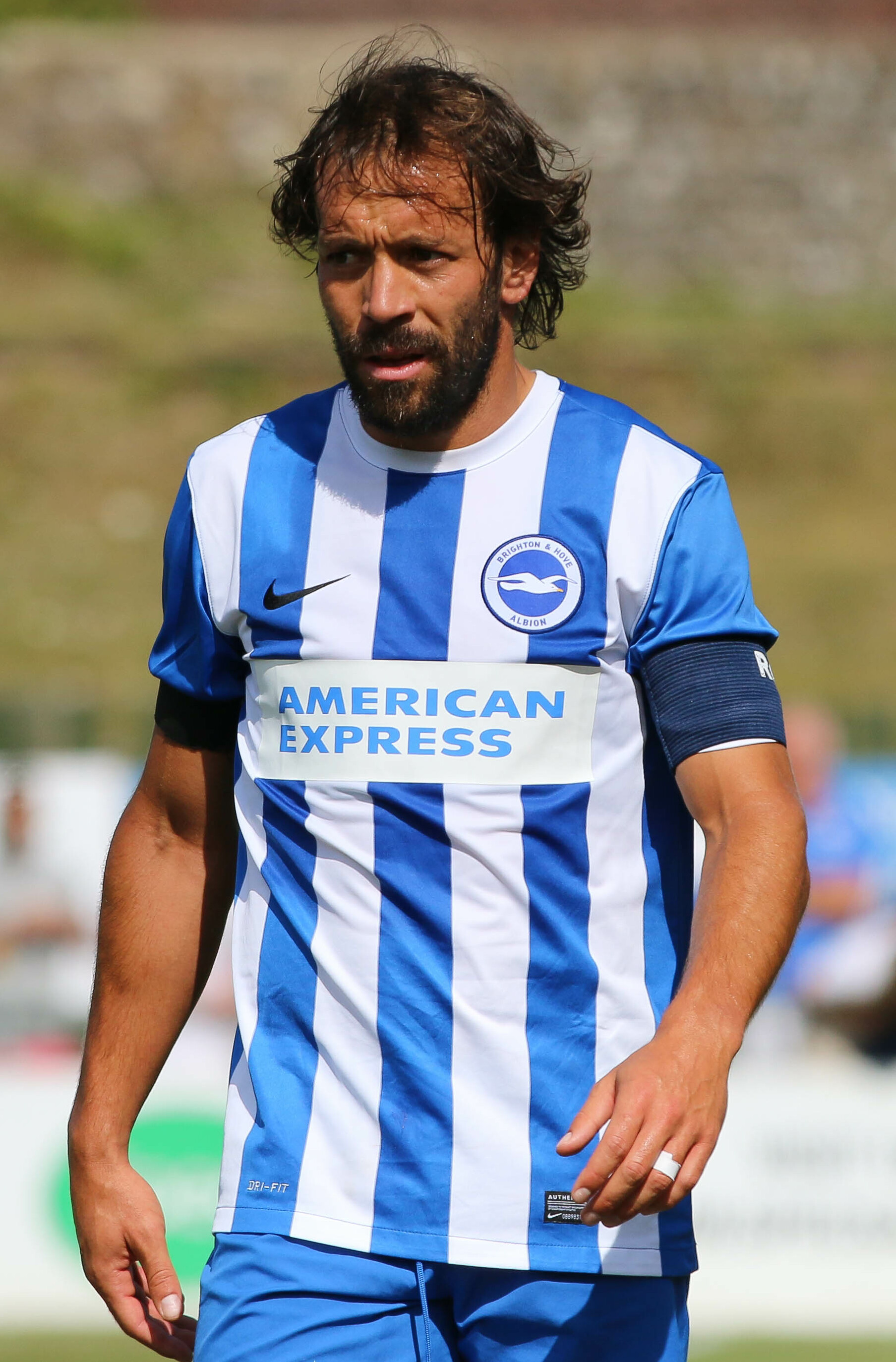
- Calderón in 2015

Personal information
- Full name: Íñigo Calderón Zapatería
- Date of birth: 4 January 1982 (age 44)
- Place of birth: Vitoria, Spain
- Height: 1.79 m (5 ft 10 in)
- Position: Right-back

Team information
- Current team: Kitchee (head coach)

Youth career
- Alavés

Senior career*
Years	Team	Apps	(Gls)
2000–2002	Alavés C		
2001–2004	Alavés B	71	(1)
2004–2007	Alicante	84	(5)
2007–2009	Alavés	52	(1)
2010–2016	Brighton & Hove Albion	198	(18)
2016–2017	Anorthosis	28	(3)
2017–2019	Chennaiyin	32	(4)
Total		465+	(32+)

Managerial career
- 2024–2025: Bristol Rovers
- 2025–: Kitchee
- * Club domestic league appearances and goals

Íñigo Calderón Zapatería (born 4 January 1982) is a Spanish former professional footballer who played as a right-back. He is the current head coach of Hong Kong Premier League club Kitchee.

He played for Alicante and Alavés in Spain, joining Brighton & Hove Albion in 2010 and going on to remain several years with the club while appearing in 232 competitive games.

== Playing career ==
=== Spain ===
Born in Vitoria-Gasteiz, Álava, Basque Country, Calderón started his professional career with Alicante in the Segunda División B, achieving two first-place finishes and one third during his three-year spell but seeing his team consecutively fail in the promotion play-offs.

In 2007, he moved to Alavés (he had already represented its C and B sides early in his career), playing two Segunda División seasons – often serving as team captain– and suffering relegation in his second year.

=== Brighton & Hove Albion ===
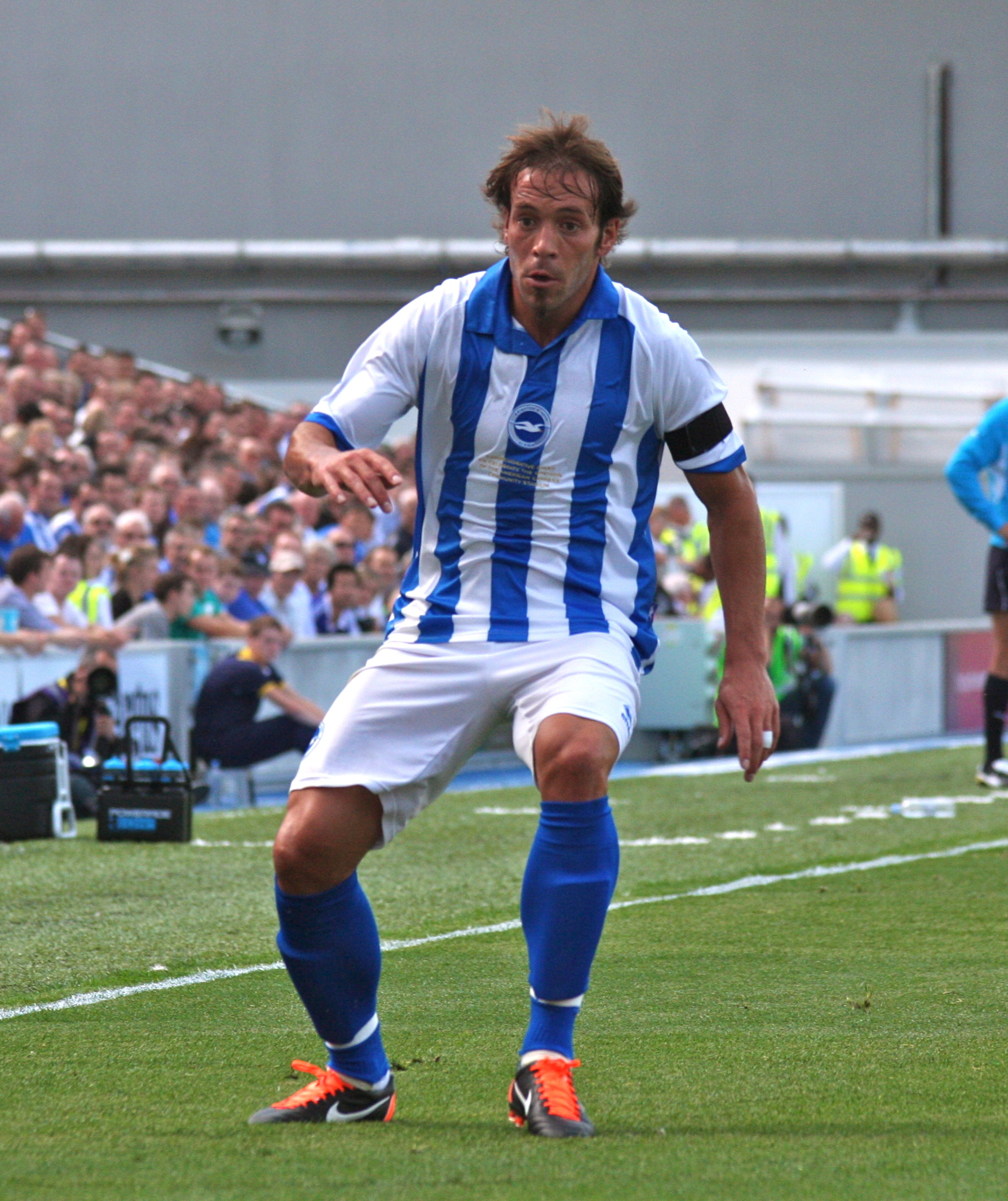
Calderón with Brighton & Hove Albion in 2011

On 7 January 2010, after a spell on trial, Calderón signed with Football League One club Brighton & Hove Albion on a contract until the end of the campaign. He made his debut nine days later in a 2–1 win at Walsall, and scored his first goal for the Seagulls in another away fixture (also 2–1 victory), against Charlton Athletic on 23 February.

Calderón's offer of a new contract at Brighton was withdrawn after he agreed to join League One rivals Southampton in May 2010. However, on 10 June, the player agreed to a new three-year deal, with manager Gus Poyet claiming "Calde is a quality player and was always our first-choice right-back...".

In the 2010–11 season, Calderón scored eight goals, including a first-half strike in the 4–3 victory over Dagenham & Redbridge that helped Albion secure promotion to the Championship. He subsequently signed a one-year extension, keeping him at the Falmer Stadium until 2014.

Calderón netted his first goal of 2011–12 in the 2–0 home defeat of Bristol City – a thunderous drive from 25 yards. He appeared predominantly as a right midfielder in 2014–15, scoring four times and being subsequently voted player of the season.

=== Later career ===
On 9 July 2016, aged 34, free agent Calderón joined Cypriot First Division club Anorthosis Famagusta on a one-year contract. On 19 July 2017, he switched to the Indian Super League with Chennaiyin.

== Coaching career ==
=== Beginnings ===
During the later years of his career, Calderón secured a UEFA Pro Licence, before returning to his former club Alavés as assistant manager to the reserves following his retirement. He went back to Brighton & Hove Albion in June 2023, being named under-18 head coach.

=== Bristol Rovers ===
On 26 December 2024, Calderón was appointed manager of League One side Bristol Rovers on a two-and-a-half year deal. Having watched a 3–1 away defeat against Exeter City from the stands on the day of his appointment, his first match in charge was a 3–0 loss at Stevenage, with his team ending the calendar year in 20th position; 2025 saw an upturn in form however, with thirteen points from the first eight matches including vital wins over fellow strugglers Cambridge United, Peterborough United and Burton Albion, and the manager talked of the importance of helping erase the negative atmosphere that surrounded the club at the time of his appointment.

Despite this, Calderón's side would pick up just one point in nine games across March and April 2025, having their relegation confirmed on 29 April after a point elsewhere for Burton Albion left the Rovers four points from safety with just one fixture remaining. Subsequently, he confirmed that he would like to remain at the Memorial Stadium, admitting however that the situation was out of his control; on 4 May, following a 4–1 final day away defeat to Blackpool, he left.

=== Kitchee ===
On 4 July 2025, Calderón became head coach of Hong Kong Premier League club Kitchee. He won the national championship in his first season, also reaching the final in the domestic League Cup.

== Personal life ==
Calderón has a master's degree in sport psychology. He is also a qualified teacher.

== Career statistics ==
Appearances and goals by club, season and competition
Club	Season	League			National Cup		League Cup		Other		Total	
Club	Season	Division	Apps	Goals	Apps	Goals	Apps	Goals	Apps	Goals	Apps	Goals
Alavés B	2000–01	Segunda División B	1	0	—		—		—		1	0
Alavés B	2001–02	Segunda División B	2	0	—		—		—		2	0
Alavés B	2002–03	Segunda División B	35	1	—		—		—		35	1
Alavés B	2003–04	Segunda División B	33	0	—		—		—		33	0
Alavés B	Total		71	1	—		—		—		71	1
Alicante	2004–05	Segunda División B	25	0	2	0	—		2 (Note: Appearances in promotion play-offs)	0	29	0
Alicante	2005–06	Segunda División B	31	4	3	1	—		4	0	38	5
Alicante	2006–07	Segunda División B	28	1	0	0	—		4	0	32	1
Alicante	Total		84	5	5	1	—		10	0	99	6
Alavés	2007–08	Segunda División	20	0	2	0	—		—		22	0
Alavés	2008–09	Segunda División	32	1	1	0	—		—		33	1
Alavés	Total		52	1	3	0	—		—		55	1
Brighton & Hove Albion	2009–10	League One	19	1	1	0	0	0	—		20	1
Brighton & Hove Albion	2010–11	League One	44	7	5	1	0	0	1 (Note: Appearances in Football League Trophy)	0	50	8
Brighton & Hove Albion	2011–12	Championship	32	4	4	0	3	0	—		39	4
Brighton & Hove Albion	2012–13	Championship	28	0	1	0	1	0	2	0	32	0
Brighton & Hove Albion	2013–14	Championship	23	2	4	0	1	0	2	0	30	2
Brighton & Hove Albion	2014–15	Championship	35	4	2	0	4	0	—		41	4
Brighton & Hove Albion	2015–16	Championship	17	0	1	0	2	0	—		20	0
Brighton & Hove Albion	Total		198	18	18	1	11	0	5	0	232	19
Anorthosis	2016–17	Cypriot First Division	28	3	4	0	—		—		32	3
Chennaiyin	2017–18	Indian Super League	20	3	—		—		—		20	3
Chennaiyin	2018–19	Indian Super League	12	1	—		—		—		12	1
Chennaiyin	Total		32	4	—		—		—		32	4
Career total			465	32	30	2	11	0	15	0	521	34

== Managerial statistics ==
As of match played 17 May 2026

Managerial record by team and tenure
Team	Nat.	From	To	Record					Ref.
Team	Nat.	From	To	G	W	D	L	Win %	Ref.
Bristol Rovers	(England)	26 December 2024	4 May 2025	26	6	3	17	23.08	
Kitchee	(Hong Kong)	4 July 2025	Present	27	18	5	4	66.67	
Career Total				53	24	8	21	45.28	

== Honours ==
=== Player ===
Brighton & Hove Albion

- Football League One: 2010–11

Chennaiyin

- Indian Super League: 2017–18

Individual

- PFA Team of the Year: 2010–11 League One
- Indian Super League Fittest Player: 2017–18

=== Manager ===
Kitchee

- Hong Kong Premier League: 2025–26
