= Mitch Walker (footballer) =

English footballer

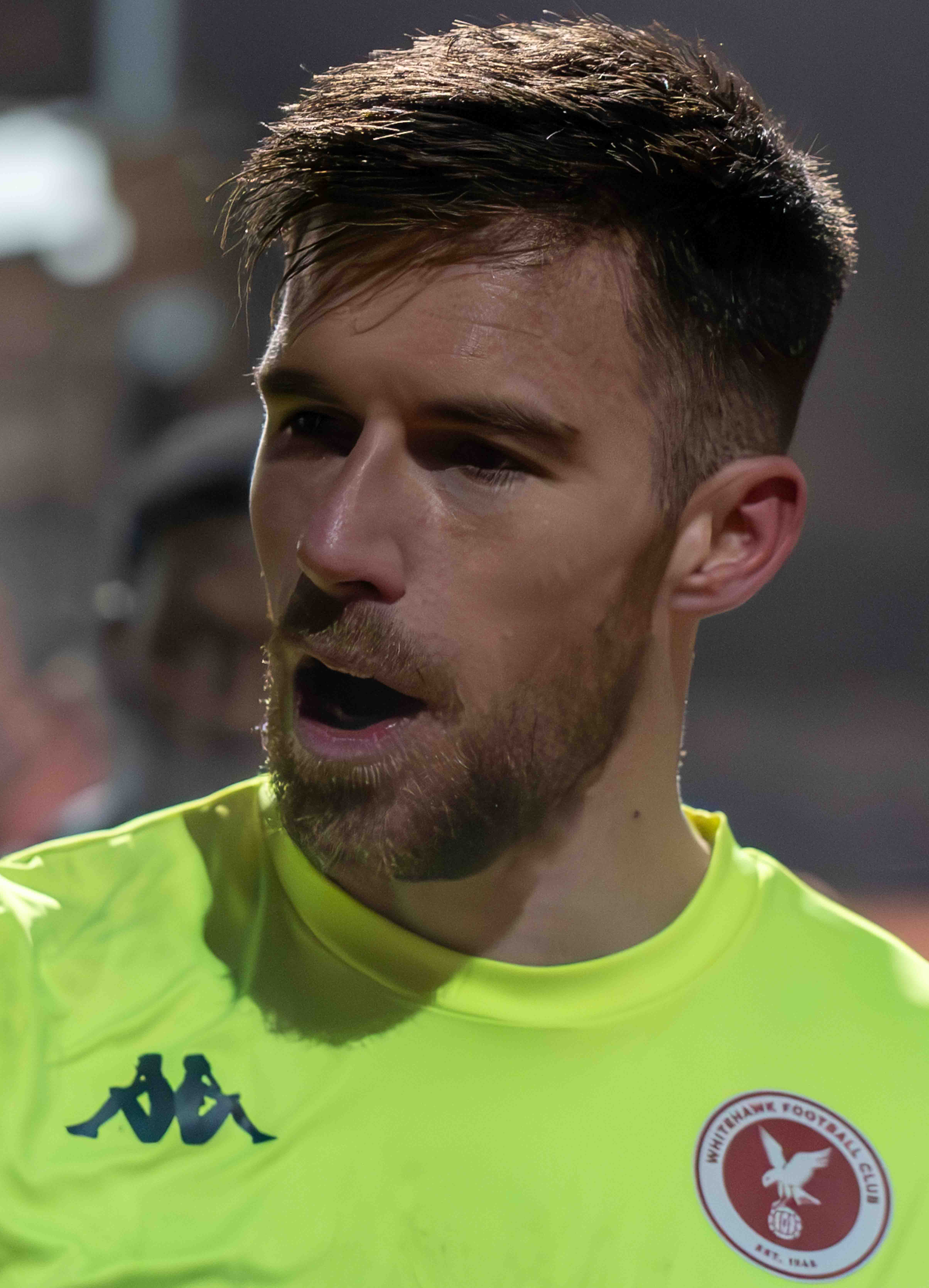
- Whitehawk goalkeeper Mitch Walker at Hornchurch in December 2023

Personal information
- Full name: Mitchell Charles Alan Walker
- Date of birth: 24 September 1991 (age 35)
- Place of birth: St Albans, England
- Height: 6 ft 2 in (1.88 m)
- Position: Goalkeeper

Team information
- Current team: Dover Athletic

Youth career
- 2000-2002: Crawley Down
- 2002-?: Three Bridges
- ? -2009: Brighton & Hove Albion

Senior career*
Years	Team	Apps	(Gls)
2009–2012	Brighton & Hove Albion	1	(0)
2010	→ Eastbourne Borough (loan)	1	(0)
2011	→ Welling United (loan)	6	(0)
2012	→ Eastbourne Borough (loan)	12	(0)
2012–2019	Dover Athletic	241	(0)
2019–2022	Aldershot Town	85	(0)
2022–2023	Tonbridge Angels	0	(0)
2023–2024	Whitehawk	42	(0)
2024–	Dover Athletic	63	(0)

International career
2013–2014	England C	4	(0)
- * Club domestic league appearances and goals as of 08:17, 1 May 2026 (UTC)

Mitchell Charles Alan Walker (born 24 September 1991 in St Albans, Hertfordshire) is an English professional footballer who plays for Dover Athletic as a goalkeeper.

== Early career ==
Walker started out as an under 9's goalkeeper at Crawley Down before switching to Three Bridges, from where he was signed by Brighton & Hove Albion after a trial. He signed pro forms for the Albion in August 2009 while still a second year scholar, playing regularly in the reserves.

== Career ==
Walker made his professional debut for Brighton & Hove Albion on the last day of the 2009–10 season starting in the 1–0 victory over Yeovil Town at the Withdean Stadium.

During January 2011, Walker signed on loan with Conference South side Welling United. On 1 March 2012, Walker joined Eastbourne Borough for a second loan spell.

Walker spent seven years at Dover Athletic before joining Aldershot Town in the summer of 2019. He went on to feature 93 times for the Hampshire-based side before leaving in July 2022, following a serious knee injury.

On 1 December 2022, Walker signed for Tonbridge Angels, initially as the goalkeeper coach as he was out injured. Walker joined Whitehawk for the start of the 2023-24 season.

On 25 May 2024, Walker returned to Dover Athletic following their relegation to the Isthmian League Premier Division. On 31 August 2024, Walker scored a first career goal as the wind carried his long free-kick over the Sittingbourne goalkeeper.

On Saturday 31 August 2024 Walker scored a goal direct from a free kick away to Sittingbourne FC in the 1st Qualifying Round of the FA Cup. Dover would score two in two minutes of injury time to draw this match and take this to a replay.

== Career statistics ==
As of end of 2023–24 season

Club	Season	League			FA Cup		League Cup		Other		Total	
Club	Season	Division	Apps	Goals	Apps	Goals	Apps	Goals	Apps	Goals	Apps	Goals
Brighton & Hove Albion	2009–10	League One	1	0	0	0	0	0	0	0	1	0
Eastbourne Borough (loan)	2009–10	Conference Premier	1	0	0	0	—		0	0	1	0
Welling United (loan)	2010–11	Conference South	6	0	0	0	—		0	0	6	0
Eastbourne Borough (loan)	2011–12	Conference South	12	0	0	0	—		0	0	12	0
Dover Athletic	2012–13	Conference South	39	0	2	0	—		5 (Note: Two appearances in FA Trophy, three in Conference South play-offs)	0	46	0
Dover Athletic	2013–14	Conference South	42	0	5	0	—		8 (Note: Five appearances in FA Trophy, three in Conference South play-offs)	0	55	0
Dover Athletic	2014–15	Conference Premier	20	0	0	0	—		1 (Note: Appearance(s) in FA Trophy)	0	21	0
Dover Athletic	2015–16	National League	34	0	2	0	—		4 (Note: Two appearances in FA Trophy, two in National League play-offs)	0	40	0
Dover Athletic	2016–17	National League	16	0	3	0	—		0	0	19	0
Dover Athletic	2017–18	National League	46	0	2	0	—		3	0	51	0
Dover Athletic	2018–19	National League	36	0	2	0	—		1	0	39	0
Dover Athletic	Total		233	0	16	0	—		22	0	271	0
Aldershot Town	2019–20	National League	39	0	1	0	—		1	0	41	0
Aldershot Town	2020–21	National League	28	0	1	0	—		3	0	32	0
Aldershot Town	2021–22	National League	18	0	1	0	—		1	0	20	0
Aldershot Town	Total		85	0	3	0	—		5	0	93	0
Whitehawk	2023–24	Isthmian League Premier Division	42	0	4	0	—		9 (Note: Four appearances in FA Trophy, two appearances in Sussex Senior Challenge Cup, three appearances in Alan Turvey Trophy)	0	55	0
Dover Athletic	2024-25	Isthmian League Premier Division	19	0	2	1			2	0	23	1
Dover Athletic	2025-26	National League South	44	0	1	0			2	0	47	0
Career total			443	0	25	1	0	0	40	0	509	1
