= 2016–17 Brighton & Hove Albion F.C. season =

115th season in existence of Brighton & Hove Albion

Brighton & Hove Albion
2016–17 season
- Chairman: Tony Bloom
- Manager: Chris Hughton
- Stadium: Falmer Stadium
- Championship: 2nd (promoted)
- FA Cup: Fourth round
- EFL Cup: Third round
- Top goalscorer: League: Glenn Murray (23); All: Glenn Murray (23)
- Highest home attendance: 30,338 vs Bristol City (29 April 2017)
- Lowest home attendance: 24,166 vs Huddersfield Town (13 September 2016)
- Average home league attendance: 27,995
Home colours	Away colours

The 2016–17 season was Brighton & Hove Albion's 115th year in existence and sixth consecutive season in the Championship. Along with competing in the Championship, the club participated in the FA Cup and EFL Cup.

Brighton were promoted to the Premier League following their 2–1 home win against Wigan Athletic on 17 April 2017, with fellow promotion chasers Huddersfield Town failing to match Brighton's result in their fixture against Derby County.

The season covers the period from 1 July 2016 to 30 June 2017.

== Squad ==
=== First-team squad ===
Note: Flags indicate national team as defined under FIFA eligibility rules; some limited exceptions apply. Players may hold more than one non-FIFA nationality.

No.	Pos.	Nation	Player
1	GK	FIN	Niki Mäenpää
2	DF	ESP	Bruno (captain)
3	DF	CMR	Gaëtan Bong
4	DF	GER	Uwe Hünemeier
5	DF	ENG	Lewis Dunk (vice-captain)
6	MF	ENG	Dale Stephens
7	MF	ISR	Beram Kayal
8	MF	CZE	Jiří Skalák
9	FW	ENG	Sam Baldock
10	FW	ISR	Tomer Hemed
11	MF	FRA	Anthony Knockaert
12	DF	BEL	Sébastien Pocognoli (on loan from West Bromwich Albion)
13	GK	ENG	David Stockdale
14	MF	ENG	Steve Sidwell

No.	Pos.	Nation	Player
15	MF	SCO	Jamie Murphy
16	GK	DEN	Casper Ankergren
17	FW	ENG	Glenn Murray
18	DF	ENG	Connor Goldson
20	MF	ENG	Solly March
21	MF	NIR	Oliver Norwood
22	DF	IRL	Shane Duffy
23	DF	ENG	Liam Rosenior
24	MF	ENG	Rohan Ince
25	DF	NOR	Vegard Forren
27	DF	ENG	Fikayo Tomori (on loan from Chelsea)
28	FW	ENG	Chuba Akpom (on loan from Arsenal)
29	MF	IRL	Richie Towell

=== Out on loan ===
Note: Flags indicate national team as defined under FIFA eligibility rules; some limited exceptions apply. Players may hold more than one non-FIFA nationality.

No.	Pos.	Nation	Player
19	FW	GHA	Elvis Manu (on loan at Go Ahead Eagles until 30 June 2017)
30	MF	COD	Kazenga LuaLua (on loan at Queens Park Rangers until 30 June 2017)
34	FW	KEN	Jonah Ayunga (on loan at Sligo Rovers until 1 January 2018)
35	MF	WAL	Connor Tighe (on loan at Whitehawk until 13 February 2017)
38	MF	ENG	Joe Ward (on loan at Lincoln City until 13 February 2017)

No.	Pos.	Nation	Player
42	DF	ENG	Rob Hunt (on loan at Oldham Athletic until 30 June 2017)
45	DF	IRL	Tom Cadman (on loan at East Grinstead until 13 February 2017)
—	FW	ENG	Jordan Maguire-Drew (on loan at Dagenham & Redbridge until 30 June 2017)
—	FW	ENG	Chris O'Grady (on loan at Burton Albion until 30 June 2017)
—	GK	ENG	Christian Walton (on loan at Luton Town until 30 June 2017)

== Transfers ==
=== Transfers in ===
Date from	Position	Nationality	Name	From	Fee	Ref.
1 July 2016	CB	NIR	Ben Hall	Motherwell	£200,000	
1 July 2016	CM	ENG	Steve Sidwell	Stoke City	Free transfer	
12 July 2016	RB	ENG	Tyler Hornby-Forbes	Fleetwood Town	Undisclosed	
4 August 2016	CM	NIR	Oliver Norwood	Reading	Undisclosed	
26 August 2016	CB	IRL	Shane Duffy	Blackburn Rovers	£4,500,000	
9 January 2017	LB	WAL	Jordan Davies	Wrexham	Undisclosed	
17 January 2017	GK	ENG	Billy Collings	Reading	Undisclosed	
21 January 2017	CF	SCO	Harry Cardwell	Reading	Undisclosed	
31 January 2017	CF	ENG	Glenn Murray	AFC Bournemouth	Undisclosed	
7 March 2017	CB	NOR	Vegard Forren	Molde	Free transfer	

=== Transfers out ===
Date from	Position	Nationality	Name	To	Fee	Ref.
1 July 2016	RB	ESP	Iñigo Calderón	Anorthosis	Released	
1 July 2016	LB	ENG	Adam Chicksen	Charlton Athletic (Note: Following Adam Chicksen being released, he later signed for Charlton Athletic.)	Released	
1 July 2016	CM	WAL	Andrew Crofts	Charlton Athletic (Note: Following Andrew Crofts being released, he later signed for Charlton Athletic.)	Released	
1 July 2016	CB	SCO	Gordon Greer	Blackburn Rovers (Note: Following Gordon Greer being released, he later signed for Blackburn Rovers.)	Released	
1 July 2016	CB	IRL	Glen Rea	Luton Town	Undisclosed	
1 July 2016	CF	ENG	Bobby Zamora	Retired (Note: Following Bobby Zamora being release, he later announced his retirement from professional football.)	Released	
6 July 2016	CF	ENG	Daniel Akindayini	Margate	Free transfer	
5 August 2016	CF	WAL	Chike Kandi	Woking	Free transfer	
25 August 2016	CM	NED	Danny Holla	PEC Zwolle	Free transfer	
4 January 2017	LW	SCO	Jack Harper	Málaga	Undisclosed	
5 January 2017	CM	ENG	Jake Forster-Caskey	Charlton Athletic	Undisclosed	
19 January 2017	ST	IRL	Thomas Byrne	Drogheda United	Free transfer	
31 January 2017	CM	ENG	Jesse Starkey	Swindon Town	Undisclosed	

=== Loans in ===
Date from	Position	Nationality	Name	From	Date until	Ref.
3 July 2016	CF	ENG	Glenn Murray	AFC Bournemouth	31 January 2017	(Note: On 31 January 2017, Glenn Murray signed on a permanent deal.)
15 July 2016	LB	CAN	Sam Adekugbe	Vancouver Whitecaps	End of season	
31 August 2016	LB	BEL	Sébastien Pocognoli	West Bromwich Albion	End of season	
23 January 2017	CB	ENG	Fikayo Tomori	Chelsea	End of season	
30 January 2017	CF	ENG	Chuba Akpom	Arsenal	End of season	

=== Loans out ===
Date from	Position	Nationality	Name	To	Date until	Ref.
1 July 2016	GK	ENG	Christian Walton	Luton Town	31 January 2017	(Note: On 31 January 2017, Walton's loan at Luton was terminated.)
16 July 2016	CF	ENG	Chris O'Grady	Burton Albion	End of season	
18 July 2016	CB	ENG	Tom Dallison	Cambridge United	8 January 2017	
19 July 2016	CF	ENG	Jordan Maguire-Drew	Dagenham & Redbridge	End of season	(Note: On 12 January 2017, Maguire-Drew extended his loan spell with Dagenham & Redbridge.)
20 July 2016	CM	ENG	Jake Forster-Caskey	Rotherham United	5 January 2017	(Note: On 5 January 2017, Forster-Caskey's loan at Rotherham was terminated.)
23 October 2016	CF	KEN	Jonah Ayunga	Burgess Hill Town	20 November 2016	
25 November 2016	GK	ENG	Bailey Vose	Concord Rangers	1 January 2017	
1 January 2017	FW	GHA	Elvis Manu	Go Ahead Eagles	End of season	
11 January 2017	LW	COD	Kazenga LuaLua	Queens Park Rangers	End of season	
13 January 2017	DF	IRL	Tom Cadman	East Grinstead Town	12 February 2017	
13 January 2017	CM	WAL	Connor Tighe	Whitehawk	12 February 2017	
13 January 2017	RW	ENG	Joe Ward	Lincoln City	14 April 2017	(Note: On 10 February 2017, Ward extended his loan spell with Lincoln City.)
23 January 2017	CF	KEN	Jonah Ayunga	Sligo Rovers	January 2018	
26 January 2017	RB	ENG	Rob Hunt	Oldham Athletic	End of Season	
31 January 2017	DM	ENG	Rohan Ince	Swindon Town	End of Season	
6 March 2017	RW	NOR	Henrik Björdal	Göteborg	16 July 2017	

== Pre-season ==
=== Friendlies ===
16 July 2016 Friendly	Crawley Town	0–4	Brighton & Hove Albion	Crawley
15:00 CEST		Report	Kayal 18'; Hemed 32'; Murray 49'; Manu 86'	Stadium: Broadfield Stadium

19 July 2016 Friendly	Fulham	3–0	Brighton & Hove Albion	Aldershot
19:45 BST	Woodrow 32'; Sessegnon 52'; Stearman 80'	Report		Stadium: Recreation Ground; Attendance: 1,076

23 July 2016 Friendly	Luton Town	2–1	Brighton & Hove Albion	Luton
14:00 BST	Marriott 1', 58'	Report	Dunk 43'	Stadium: Kenilworth Road

23 July 2016 Friendly	Stevenage	1–0	Brighton & Hove Albion	Stevenage
17:30 BST	Liburd 31'	Report		Stadium: Broadhall Way

26 July 2016 Friendly	Oxford United	0–4	Brighton & Hove Albion	Oxford
19:45 BST		Report	Knockaert 18'; Cadman 67'; Hemed 76', 85'	Stadium: Kassam Stadium

31 July 2016 Friendly	Brighton & Hove Albion	0–1	Lazio	Falmer, Brighton
15:00 BST		Report	Morrison 27'	Stadium: Falmer Stadium

== Competitions ==
=== Championship ===
==== League table ====
Pos	Team	Pld	W	D	L	GF	GA	GD	Pts	Promotion, qualification or relegation
1	Newcastle United (C, P)	46	29	7	10	85	40	+45	94	Promotion to the Premier League
2	Brighton & Hove Albion (P)	46	28	9	9	74	40	+34	93	Promotion to the Premier League
3	Reading	46	26	7	13	68	64	+4	85	Qualification for the Championship play-offs (Note: Four teams play for one spot and promotion to the Premier League.)
4	Sheffield Wednesday	46	24	9	13	60	45	+15	81	Qualification for the Championship play-offs
5	Huddersfield Town (O, P)	46	25	6	15	56	58	−2	81	Qualification for the Championship play-offs

Source: English Football League, Soccerway
Rules for classification: 1) Points; 2) Goal difference; 3) Number of goals scored; 4) Points in head-to-head matches; 5) Goal difference in head-to-head matches; 6) Goals scored in head-to-head matches; 7) Play-off.
(C) Champions; (O) Play-off winners; (P) Promoted

==== Results round by round ====
Round	1	2	3	4	5	6	7	8	9	10	11	12	13	14	15	16	17	18	19	20	21	22	23	24	25	26	27	28	29	30	31	32	33	34	35	36	37	38	39	40	41	42	43	44	45	46
Ground	A	H	H	A	A	H	H	A	H	A	A	H	H	A	H	A	H	H	A	H	A	A	H	A	A	H	H	A	A	H	H	A	H	H	A	A	H	A	H	H	A	A	H	A	H	A
Result	D	W	W	D	L	L	W	W	W	D	W	D	W	W	W	W	D	W	D	W	W	W	W	W	L	W	W	L	D	W	D	W	W	L	L	W	W	L	W	W	W	W	W	L	L	D
Position	11	6	1	2	8	13	7	7	3	3	4	4	3	2	2	2	2	2	2	1	2	2	1	1	2	1	1	1	2	2	2	1	1	2	2	2	2	2	2	1	1	1	1	1	1	2

Updated to match(es) played on 7 May 2017. Source:
A = Away; H = Home; W = Win; D = Draw; L = Loss

==== Matches ====
Brighton's fixture list for the 2016–17 Championship season was revealed on 22 June 2016.

6 August 2016 1	Derby County	0–0	Brighton & Hove Albion	Derby
15:00 BST	Bryson (yellow card) 41'; Hendrick (yellow card) 84'	Report	Kayal (yellow card) 60'; Knockaert (yellow card) 72'	Stadium: Pride Park; Attendance: 28,749; Referee: Jeremy Simpson

12 August 2016 2	Brighton & Hove Albion	3–0	Nottingham Forest	Falmer, Brighton
19:45 BST	Knockaert 36'; Bong (yellow card) 43'; Hemed (yellow card) 57'; Murray 68', 82'; Baldock (yellow card) 88'	Report	Kasami (yellow card) 45+1'; Iacovitti (yellow card) 59'	Stadium: Falmer Stadium; Attendance: 25,748; Referee: Andrew Madley
Note: Live on Sky Sports

16 August 2016 3	Brighton & Hove Albion	3–0	Rotherham United	Falmer, Brighton
19:45 BST	Knockaert 23'; Murray 26'; Dunk (yellow card) 48'; Hemed 58' (pen.)	Report	Kelly (yellow card) 57'; Ball (yellow card) 57'; Fisher (yellow card) 76'; Allan (yellow card) 84'	Stadium: Falmer Stadium; Attendance: 25,128; Referee: Simon Hooper

20 August 2016 4	Reading	2–2	Brighton & Hove Albion	Reading
15:00 BST	Swift 2'; Van den Berg (yellow card) 8' (yellow-red card) 90'; McShane 59'; Williams (yellow card) 90+1'; Kermorgant (yellow card) 90+3'	Report	Van den Berg 8' (o.g.); Knockaert 46'; Dunk (yellow card) 57'; Bong (yellow card) 72'	Stadium: Madejski Stadium; Attendance: 16,781; Referee: Mike Jones

27 August 2016 5	Newcastle United	2–0	Brighton & Hove Albion	Newcastle upon Tyne
17:30 BST	Lascelles 15', (yellow card) 54'; Shelvey (yellow card) 22', (goal) 63'; Ritchie (yellow card) 34'; Pérez (yellow card) 34'	Report	Baldock (yellow card) 45+1' (yellow-red card) 54'; Knockaert (yellow card) 84'	Stadium: St James' Park; Attendance: 49,196; Referee: Keith Stroud

10 September 2016 6	Brighton & Hove Albion	0–2	Brentford	Falmer, Brighton
15:00 BST	Knockaert (yellow card) 32'; Hemed (yellow card) 45+1'; Bong (yellow card) 60'; Manu (yellow card) 63'; Stephens (yellow card) 75'	Report	Woods (yellow card) 26'; Hogan 29', 70'; Egan (yellow card) 43'	Stadium: Falmer Stadium; Attendance: 26,388; Referee: Scott Duncan

13 September 2016 7	Brighton & Hove Albion	1–0	Huddersfield Town	Falmer, Brighton
19:45 BST	Dunk (yellow card) 62'; Knockaert 80'	Report	Schindler (yellow card) 55'	Stadium: Falmer Stadium; Attendance: 24,166; Referee: Andy Woolmer

17 September 2016 8	Burton Albion	0–1	Brighton & Hove Albion	Burton upon Trent
15:00 BST	Naylor (yellow card) 55'	Report	Stephens (yellow card) 50'; Hemed 88' (pen.); Bong (yellow card) 90+3'	Stadium: Pirelli Stadium; Attendance: 4,756; Referee: Geoff Eltringham

24 September 2016 9	Brighton & Hove Albion	2–0	Barnsley	Falmer, Brighton
15:00 BST	Dunk (yellow card) 9'; Murray 12', 48'; Bong (yellow card) 19'; Bruno (yellow card) 28'	Report	Scowen (yellow card) 66'; Kpekawa (yellow card) 72'	Stadium: Falmer Stadium; Attendance: 26,018; Referee: Tim Robinson

27 September 2016 10	Ipswich Town	0–0	Brighton & Hove Albion	Ipswich
19:45 BST	Lawrence (yellow card) 24'; Chambers (yellow card) 59'; Douglas (yellow card) 61'; Emmanuel (yellow card) 84'	Report	Norwood (yellow card) 37'; Stephens (yellow card) 42' (yellow-red card) 82'; Murray (yellow card) 90+3'	Stadium: Portman Road; Attendance: 15,228; Referee: Andy Davies

1 October 2016 11	Sheffield Wednesday	1–2	Brighton & Hove Albion	Sheffield
15:00 BST	Hooper 90+5'	Report	Baldock 26', (yellow card) 63'; Duffy (yellow card) 35'; Bruno (yellow card) 51'; Knockaert 73', (yellow card) 74'	Stadium: Hillsborough Stadium; Attendance: 25,605; Referee: Oliver Langford

15 October 2016 12	Brighton & Hove Albion	2–2	Preston North End	Falmer, Brighton
15:00 BST	Baldock 54'; Murray 65'	Report	Hugill 10', (yellow card) 75'; Pearson (yellow card) 82'; Makienok 90+2'	Stadium: Falmer Stadium; Attendance: 27,606; Referee: Craig Pawson

18 October 2016 13	Brighton & Hove Albion	1–0	Wolverhampton Wanderers	Falmer, Brighton
19:45 BST	Baldock 14'; Sidwell (yellow card) 49'; Dunk (yellow card) 90+6'	Report	Batth (yellow card) 21'; Iorfa (yellow card) 34'; Böðvarsson (yellow card) 90+6'	Stadium: Falmer Stadium; Attendance: 25,231; Referee: Keith Stroud

22 October 2016 14	Wigan Athletic	0–1	Brighton & Hove Albion	Wigan
15:00 BST	Power (yellow card) 89'; Le Fondre (yellow card) 90+1'	Report	Stephens 68', (yellow card) 90'	Stadium: The DW Stadium; Attendance: 10,430; Referee: Simon Hooper

29 October 2016 15	Brighton & Hove Albion	5–0	Norwich City	Falmer, Brighton
15:00 BST	Murray 6', 60', 73', (yellow card) 27'; Dunk 64'; Knockaert 84'	Report	Olsson (yellow card) 27'; Pritchard (yellow card) 49'; Tettey (yellow card) 71'	Stadium: Falmer Stadium; Attendance: 29,469; Referee: Andrew Madley

5 November 2016 16	Bristol City	0–2	Brighton & Hove Albion	Bristol
17:30 GMT	O'Neil (yellow card) 54'	Report	Sidwell 13'; Murphy 20', (yellow card) 90+3'	Stadium: Ashton Gate Stadium; Attendance: 19,096; Referee: Darren Bond

18 November 2016 17	Brighton & Hove Albion	1–1	Aston Villa	Falmer, Brighton
19:45 GMT	Murray 45'; Dunk (yellow card) 90+1'	Report	Baker 20'; Westwood (yellow card) 58'	Stadium: Falmer Stadium; Attendance: 30,107; Referee: Steve Martin

26 November 2016 18	Brighton & Hove Albion	2–1	Fulham	Falmer, Brighton
15:00 GMT	Dunk (yellow card) 47'; Baldock 52'; Sidwell (yellow card) 58'; Stephens (yellow card) 61'; Murray 79'	Report	McDonald 18', (yellow card) 76'; Sigurðsson (yellow card) 50'; Button (yellow card) 51'; Martin (yellow card) 59'; Odoi (yellow card) 79'; Fredericks (yellow card) 89'	Stadium: Falmer Stadium; Attendance: 29,445; Referee: Keith Stroud

3 December 2016 19	Cardiff City	0–0	Brighton & Hove Albion	Cardiff
15:00 GMT	Connolly (yellow card) 50'; Whittingham (yellow card) 66'; Gunnarsson (yellow card) 76'	Report	Duffy (yellow card) 51'; Bong (yellow card) 68' (yellow-red card) 90+1'; Dunk (yellow card) 83'	Stadium: Cardiff City Stadium; Attendance: 16,168; Referee: Roger East

9 December 2016 20	Brighton & Hove Albion	2–0	Leeds United	Falmer, Brighton
19:45 GMT	Murray 23' (pen.), (yellow card) 26'; Hemed 82' (pen.)	Report	Ayling (yellow card) 11'; Jansson (yellow card) 19'; Phillips (red card) 23'; Bartley (yellow card) 81'	Stadium: Falmer Stadium; Attendance: 28,206; Referee: Paul Tierney

13 December 2016 21	Blackburn Rovers	2–3	Brighton & Hove Albion	Blackburn
19:45 GMT	Greer (yellow card) 61' (yellow-red card) 74'; Gallagher 66', 90+3', (yellow card) 84'; Lowe (yellow card) 71'	Report	Skalák (yellow card) 13'; Duffy 17'; Norwood (yellow card) 43'; Stephens 61'; Dunk (yellow card) 66'; Murray 79'	Stadium: Ewood Park; Attendance: 9,976; Referee: Oliver Langford

17 December 2016 22	Birmingham City	1–2	Brighton & Hove Albion	Birmingham
15:00 GMT	Grounds (yellow card) 14'; Jutkiewicz 52'	Report	Knockaert 82'; Murray 90+5'	Stadium: St Andrew's; Attendance: 17,287; Referee: Andrew Madley

27 December 2016 23	Brighton & Hove Albion	3–0	Queens Park Rangers	Falmer, Brighton
12:30 GMT	Baldock 11'; Murray 52' (pen.); Knockaert 69'	Report	Onuoha (red card) 56'; Sylla (yellow card) 80'	Stadium: Falmer Stadium; Attendance: 30,176; Referee: Keith Stroud

2 January 2017 24	Fulham	1–2	Brighton & Hove Albion	Fulham
15:00 GMT	Smith (yellow card) 40'; Piazon 55'; Fredericks (yellow card) 90'	Report	Bruno (yellow card) 16'; Knockaert (yellow card) 71'; Hemed 74' (pen.); Dunk 75', (yellow card) 90'	Stadium: Craven Cottage; Attendance: 24,300; Referee: Stuart Attwell

14 January 2017 25	Preston North End	2–0	Brighton & Hove Albion	Preston
15:00 GMT	Huntington 13'; Robinson 53'; Cunningham (yellow card) 68'; Hugill (yellow card) 90+4'	Report	Bruno (yellow card) 63'; Duffy (yellow card) 73'; Hemed (penalty missed) 90+7'	Stadium: Deepdale Stadium; Attendance: 11,391; Referee: Simon Hooper

20 January 2017 26	Brighton & Hove Albion	2–1	Sheffield Wednesday	Falmer, Brighton
19:45 GMT	Pocognoli (yellow card) 29'; Knockaert 34', 85'; Murray (red card) 64'; Stockdale (yellow card) 89'	Report	Dunk 45' (o.g.); Hutchinson (yellow card) 53' (yellow-red card) 90+5'; Forestieri (penalty missed) 65'; Lees (yellow card) 80'; Wallace (yellow card) 87'; Fletcher (red card) 89'	Stadium: Falmer Stadium; Attendance: 27,162; Referee: Stuart Attwell

24 January 2017 27	Brighton & Hove Albion	1–0	Cardiff City	Falmer, Brighton
19:45 GMT	Hemed 73'; Knockaert (yellow card) 90'	Report	Hoilett (yellow card) 21'	Stadium: Falmer Stadium; Attendance: 26,688; Referee: Chris Kavanagh

2 February 2017 28	Huddersfield Town	3–1	Brighton & Hove Albion	Huddersfield
19:45 GMT	Smith 9'; Wells 36'; Kachunga (yellow card) 45+1', (goal) 45+3'	Report	Bruno (yellow card) 1'; Hemed 20'; Dunk (yellow card) 39' (yellow-red card) 67'; Norwood (yellow card) 79'	Stadium: John Smith's Stadium; Attendance: 20,104; Referee: James Linington

5 February 2017 29	Brentford	3–3	Brighton & Hove Albion	Brentford, London
15:00 GMT	Jota 15'; Dean 22'; Vibe (penalty missed) 57'; McEachran (yellow card) 64'; Kerschbaumer (yellow card) 90+1', (goal) 90+3'	Report	Sidwell (yellow card) 64'; March 75'; Duffy 78'; Bruno (yellow card) 90+5'; Hemed 90+6'	Stadium: Griffin Park; Attendance: 10,433; Referee: Jeremy Simpson

11 February 2017 30	Brighton & Hove Albion	4–1	Burton Albion	Falmer, Brighton
15:00 GMT	Hemed 12', 57' (pen.); Baldock 47'; Murray 83'	Report	Kightly 75'	Stadium: Falmer Stadium; Attendance: 29,464; Referee: Steve Martin

14 February 2017 31	Brighton & Hove Albion	1–1	Ipswich Town	Falmer, Brighton
19:45 GMT	Hemed 29' (pen.); Baldock (yellow card) 31'; Dunk (yellow card) 56'	Report	Kenlock (yellow card) 2'; Chambers 9'; Emmanuel (yellow card) 21'; Lawrence (yellow card) 29'; McGoldrick (yellow card) 35'; Huws (yellow card) 90+5'	Stadium: Falmer Stadium; Attendance: 26,360; Referee: Roger East

18 February 2017 32	Barnsley	0–2	Brighton & Hove Albion	Barnsley
15:00 GMT		Report	Baldock (yellow card) 5', (goal) 53', 68'	Stadium: Oakwell; Attendance: 12,743; Referee: David Coote

25 February 2017 33	Brighton & Hove Albion	3–0	Reading	Falmer, Brighton
15:00 GMT	Stephens (yellow card) 27'; Baldock 35'; Sidwell (yellow card) 55'; Murphy 56'; Knockaert 80'	Report	Evans (yellow card) 68'	Stadium: Falmer Stadium; Attendance: 29,613; Referee: Peter Bankes

28 February 2017 34	Brighton & Hove Albion	1–2	Newcastle United	Falmer, Brighton
19:45 GMT	Murray 14' (pen.), (yellow card) 90+2'; Knockaert (yellow card) 38'; Duffy (yellow card) 58'	Report	Yedlin (yellow card) 38'; Diamé 81'; Pérez 89'	Stadium: Falmer Stadium; Attendance: 30,230; Referee: Bobby Madley

4 March 2017 35	Nottingham Forest	3–0	Brighton & Hove Albion	West Bridgford
15:00 GMT	Clough 60', 90' (pen.); Osborn 89'	Report	Stephens (yellow card) 45'; Dunk (yellow card) 63'; Rosenior (yellow card) 90'	Stadium: City Ground; Attendance: 22,020; Referee: Oliver Langford

7 March 2017 36	Rotherham United	0–2	Brighton & Hove Albion	Rotherham
19:45 GMT	Vaulks (yellow card) 32'	Report	Knockaert 49'; March 79'	Stadium: New York Stadium; Attendance: 8,366; Referee: Geoff Eltringham

10 March 2017 37	Brighton & Hove Albion	3–0	Derby County	Falmer, Brighton
19:45 GMT	Knockaert 5'; Baldock 43'; Murray 78'	Report		Stadium: Falmer Stadium; Attendance: 27,552; Referee: Chris Kavanagh

18 March 2017 38	Leeds United	2–0	Brighton & Hove Albion	Leeds
15:00 GMT	Wood 63', 85' (pen.)	Report	Rosenior (yellow card) 37'; Murray (yellow card) 67'	Stadium: Elland Road; Attendance: 29,767; Referee: Lee Mason

1 April 2017 39	Brighton & Hove Albion	1–0	Blackburn Rovers	Falmer, Brighton
15:00 BST	Murray 67', (yellow card) 88'	Report	Gallagher (yellow card) 81'	Stadium: Falmer Stadium; Attendance: 30,216; Referee: Tony Harrington

4 April 2017 40	Brighton & Hove Albion	3–1	Birmingham City	Falmer, Brighton
19:45 BST	Murray 2'; Knockaert (yellow card) 39'; Hemed 48'; Hünemeier 54'; Bruno (yellow card) 90+3'	Report	Shotton (yellow card) 73'; Adams 85'	Stadium: Falmer Stadium; Attendance: 28,654; Referee: Darren Bond

7 April 2017 41	Queens Park Rangers	1–2	Brighton & Hove Albion	Shepherd's Bush, London
19:45 BST	Smith 74'	Report	Murray 58'; Pocognoli 64', (yellow card) 86'	Stadium: Loftus Road; Attendance: 16,503; Referee: Simon Hooper

14 April 2017 42	Wolverhampton Wanderers	0–2	Brighton & Hove Albion	Wolverhampton
15:00 BST	Saïss (yellow card) 87'	Report	Knockaert 45', 82'	Stadium: Molineux Stadium; Attendance: 23,221; Referee: Geoff Eltringham

17 April 2017 43	Brighton & Hove Albion	2–1	Wigan Athletic	Falmer, Brighton
15:00 BST	Murray 37'; Knockaert (yellow card) 51'; March 65'	Report	Powell 85'	Stadium: Falmer Stadium; Attendance: 29,940; Referee: James Linington

21 April 2017 44	Norwich City	2–0	Brighton & Hove Albion	Norwich
19:45 BST	Stockdale 18', 39' (o.g.); Dorrans (yellow card) 23'	Report	Knockaert (yellow card) 18'	Stadium: Carrow Road; Attendance: 26,932; Referee: Tim Robinson

29 April 2017 45	Brighton & Hove Albion	0–1	Bristol City	Falmer, Brighton
15:00 BST	Skalák (yellow card) 45'	Report	Brownhill 43'; Pack (yellow card) 47'; Bryan (yellow card) 65'	Stadium: Falmer Stadium; Attendance: 30,338; Referee: Oliver Langford

7 May 2017 46	Aston Villa	1–1	Brighton & Hove Albion	Birmingham
12:00 BST	Baker (red card) 63'; Grealish 89'	Report	Murray 64' (pen.); Pocognoli (yellow card) 90+2'	Stadium: Villa Park; Attendance: 32,856; Referee: Darren Bond

=== FA Cup ===
7 January 2017 Third round	Brighton & Hove Albion	2–0	Milton Keynes Dons	Falmer, Brighton
15:00 GMT	Kayal 9'; Hemed 72'	Report	Williams (yellow card) 75'; Maynard (yellow card) 82'	Stadium: Falmer Stadium; Attendance: 11,091; Referee: James Linington

28 January 2017 Fourth round	Lincoln City	3–1	Brighton & Hove Albion	Lincoln
15:00 GMT	Power (yellow card) 35', (goal) 57' (pen.); Wood (yellow card) 41'; Tomori 62' (o.g.); Robinson 85'	Report	Towell 24', (yellow card) 24'; Tomori (yellow card) 37'; Murray (yellow card) 53'; Norwood (yellow card) 90'	Stadium: Sincil Bank; Attendance: 9,469; Referee: Andrew Madley

=== EFL Cup ===
9 August 2016 First round	Brighton & Hove Albion	4–0	Colchester United	Falmer, Brighton
19:45 BST	Norwood (yellow card) 56'; Baldock 64'; Murphy 70', 86'; Manu 74'	Report	Kent (yellow card) 45'; Loft (yellow card) 60'	Stadium: Falmer Stadium; Attendance: 6,895; Referee: James Linington

23 August 2016 Second round	Oxford United	2–4	Brighton & Hove Albion	Oxford
19:45 BST	Thomas 28'; Crowley 90+4'	Report	Adekugbe 2' (yellow card) 85'; Hünemeier (yellow card) 41'; Holla (yellow card) 45+1'; LuaLua 76'; Manu 81'; Hemed 85'	Stadium: Kassam Stadium; Attendance: 3,189; Referee: Andy Davies

20 September 2016 Third round	Brighton & Hove Albion	1–2	Reading	Falmer, Brighton
19:45 BST	Sidwell (yellow card) 79'; Hemed 85'; Norwood (yellow card) 87'; Skalák (yellow card) 90+4'	Report	Quinn 32'; Blackett (red card) 41'; Swift 54', (yellow card) 61'	Stadium: Falmer Stadium; Attendance: 6,235; Referee: Lee Probert

== Statistics ==
=== Appearances and goals ===
No.	Pos	Nat	Player	Total		Championship		FA Cup		League Cup	
No.	Pos	Nat	Player	Apps	Goals	Apps	Goals	Apps	Goals	Apps	Goals
1	GK	(Finland) FIN	Niki Mäenpää	6	0	1	0	2	0	3	0
2	DF	(Spain) ESP	Bruno	42	0	42	0	0	0	0	0
3	DF	(Cameroon) CMR	Gaëtan Bong	24	0	24	0	0	0	0	0
4	DF	(Germany) GER	Uwe Hünemeier	15	1	11	1	2	0	2	0
5	DF	(England) ENG	Lewis Dunk	43	2	43	2	0	0	0	0
6	MF	(England) ENG	Dale Stephens	39	2	33+6	2	0	0	0	0
7	MF	(Israel) ISR	Beram Kayal	21	1	17+3	0	1	1	0	0
8	MF	(Czech Republic) CZE	Jiří Skalák	33	0	24+7	0	1	0	0+1	0
9	FW	(England) ENG	Sam Baldock	34	12	27+4	11	0	0	2+1	1
10	FW	(Israel) ISR	Tomer Hemed	39	13	20+17	11	0	0	0+2	2
11	MF	(France) FRA	Anthony Knockaert	45	15	44+1	15	0	0	0	0
12	DF	(Belgium) BEL	Sébastien Pocognoli	21	1	17+3	1	0	0	1	0
13	GK	(England) ENG	David Stockdale	45	0	45	0	0	0	0	0
14	MF	(England) ENG	Steve Sidwell	37	1	26+8	1	2	0	1	0
15	FW	(Scotland) SCO	Jamie Murphy	40	4	20+15	2	1+1	0	2+1	2
16	GK	(Denmark) DEN	Casper Ankergren	1	0	0	0	0+1	0	0	0
17	FW	(England) ENG	Glenn Murray	47	23	39+6	23	1	0	1	0
18	DF	(England) ENG	Connor Goldson	8	0	4+1	0	2	0	1	0
19	MF	(Netherlands) NED	Elvis Manu	5	2	0+2	0	0	0	3	2
20	MF	(England) ENG	Solly March	27	3	9+16	3	2	0	0	0
21	MF	(Northern Ireland) NIR	Oliver Norwood	37	0	16+17	0	1	0	3	0
22	DF	(Republic of Ireland) IRL	Shane Duffy	33	2	31	2	0	0	0+2	0
22	MF	(Netherlands) NED	Danny Holla	2	0	0	0	0	0	2	0
23	DF	(England) ENG	Liam Rosenior	10	0	9+1	0	0	0	0	0
24	MF	(England) ENG	Rohan Ince	4	0	0	0	0+1	0	3	0
27	DF	(England) ENG	Fikayo Tomori	10	0	2+7	0	1	0	0	0
28	FW	(England) ENG	Chuba Akpom	10	0	1+9	0	0	0	0	0
29	MF	(Republic of Ireland) IRL	Richie Towell	3	1	0+1	0	2	1	0	0
30	MF	(Democratic Republic of the Congo) COD	Kazenga LuaLua	5	1	0+3	0	0	0	2	1
42	DF	(England) ENG	Rob Hunt	5	0	0+1	0	1	0	3	0
43	DF	(England) ENG	Ben White	2	0	0	0	0	0	2	0
44	DF	(Canada) CAN	Sam Adekugbe	5	1	1	0	2	0	2	1
46	FW	(England) ENG	James Tilley	1	0	0	0	0	0	0+1	0
