= João Carlos Teixeira =

Portuguese footballer (born 1993)

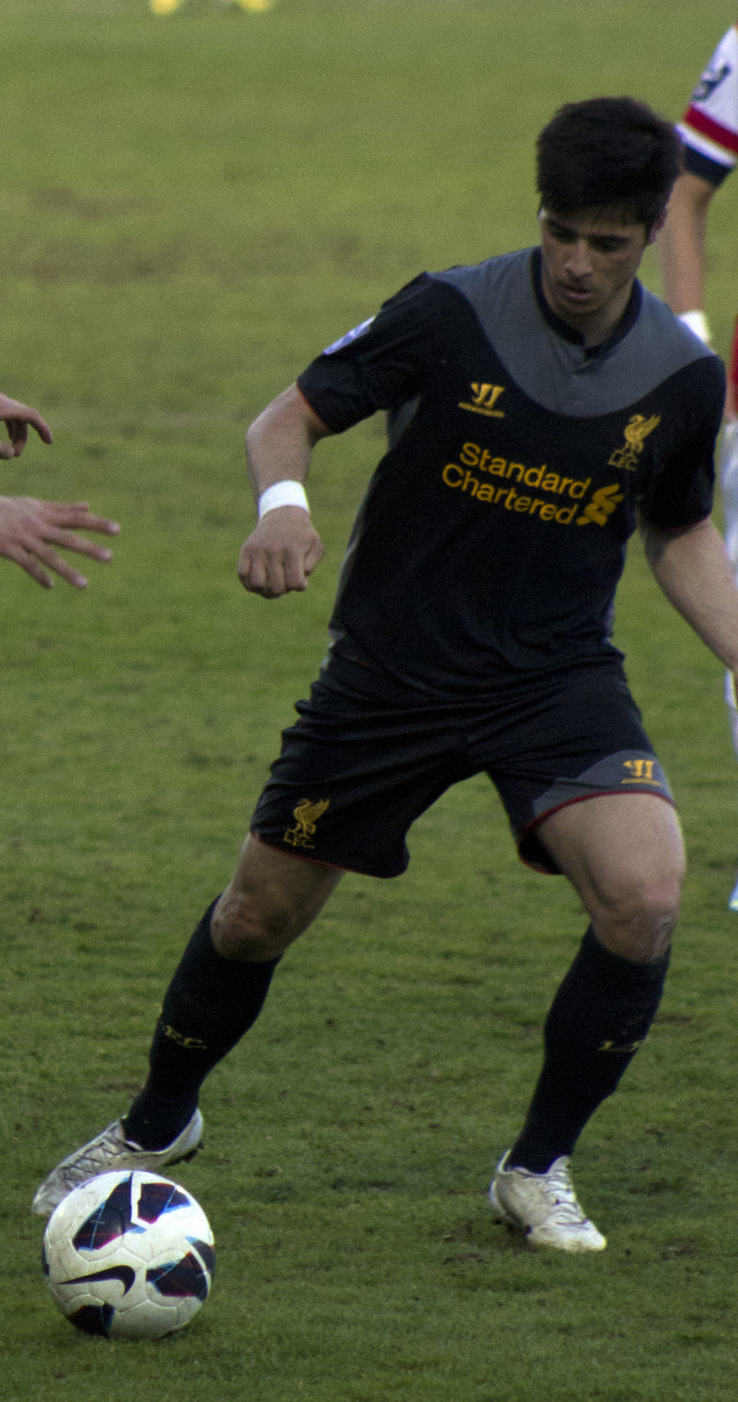
- Teixeira playing for Liverpool in 2013

Personal information
- Full name: João Carlos Vilaça Teixeira
- Date of birth: 18 January 1993 (age 33)
- Place of birth: Braga, Portugal
- Height: 1.77 m (5 ft 10 in)
- Positions: Attacking midfielder; winger

Team information
- Current team: Shanghai Shenhua
- Number: 10

Youth career
- 2003–2004: Braga
- 2004–2012: Sporting CP
- 2012–2013: Liverpool

Senior career*
Years	Team	Apps	(Gls)
2013–2016	Liverpool	2	(0)
2013	→ Brentford (loan)	2	(0)
2014–2015	→ Brighton & Hove Albion (loan)	32	(5)
2016–2018	Porto	8	(0)
2017–2018	→ Braga (loan)	14	(0)
2018–2020	Vitória Guimarães	41	(8)
2020–2022	Feyenoord	19	(0)
2022	Famalicão	11	(2)
2022–2023	Umm Salal	16	(4)
2023–	Shanghai Shenhua	90	(20)

International career
2008–2009	Portugal U16	9	(0)
2009–2010	Portugal U17	16	(1)
2010–2011	Portugal U18	6	(1)
2011–2012	Portugal U19	5	(2)
2012–2013	Portugal U20	6	(0)
2013–2015	Portugal U21	2	(1)
2016	Portugal Olympic	1	(0)
- * Club domestic league appearances and goals as of 19 November 2026

João Carlos Vilaça Teixeira (born 18 January 1993) is a Portuguese professional footballer who plays as an attacking midfielder for Chinese Super League club Shanghai Shenhua.

After developing at Braga and Sporting CP he joined Liverpool for £800,000 in January 2012. He made eight total appearances for Liverpool, scoring once, and had loans at Brentford in League One and Brighton & Hove Albion in the Championship, winning Player of the Year at the latter. He returned to Portugal in 2016, and made over 70 Primeira Liga appearances for Braga, Porto, Vitória de Guimarães and Famalicão.

== Club career ==
=== Sporting CP ===
Teixeira joined Sporting CP from hometown club Braga in 2004 and progressed through the youth teams. He began training with the first team and was given the number 46 shirt for the 2011–12 season. His first involvement for the senior side came in December 2011, when he was an unused substitute for Europa League matches against FC Zürich and Lazio.

=== Liverpool ===
Having been a youth player at Braga and Sporting CP, Teixeira joined Premier League side Liverpool in a £830,000 deal during the January 2012 transfer window. He had impressed Liverpool Academy manager Frank McParland with his performances in midfield for Sporting Lisbon against Liverpool during the 2011–12 NextGen Series. The move almost fell through due to a back injury. Upon joining Liverpool, Teixeira was hailed as "the new Deco". Teixeira made 20 U21 Premier League appearances for Liverpool during the 2012–13 season, scoring 2 goals as Liverpool reached the competition's semi-finals, where they lost 3–0 to Manchester United.

==== 2013–14 season: Brentford loan and debut ====
Teixeira made his first U21 appearance of the 2013–14 season on 2 September, scoring the equaliser in a 1–1 draw with Leicester City, and followed it with the concluding goal of a 5–0 rout of Tottenham Hotspur on 7 October.

Amidst interest from Bologna, Teixeira joined League One side Brentford on 10 September 2013 on a youth loan running until 5 January 2014. On 14 September he made the first professional appearance of his career in a 4–3 victory at Tranmere Rovers, coming on as an added-time substitute for George Saville. He then made his second appearance on 23 September as a substitute for Martin Fillo, playing 21 minutes in a 2–0 home defeat to Leyton Orient. However, as Brentford fell further down League One, manager Uwe Rösler admitted that due to the team's downturn in form, he could no longer guarantee the game time Liverpool expected for Teixeira. The loan was therefore terminated early by Liverpool on 7 October, Teixeira having made just two league appearances.

After returning to the Liverpool Reserves, on 12 February 2014 Teixeira made his senior team debut as an 82nd-minute substitute for Raheem Sterling against Fulham, in a tightly contested 3–2 win at Craven Cottage. He was involved in the buildup play that led to Daniel Sturridge winning the penalty that won Liverpool the game. The young midfielder was praised after the game by manager Brendan Rodgers and captain Steven Gerrard.

==== 2014–15 season: Brighton & Hove Albion (loan) ====
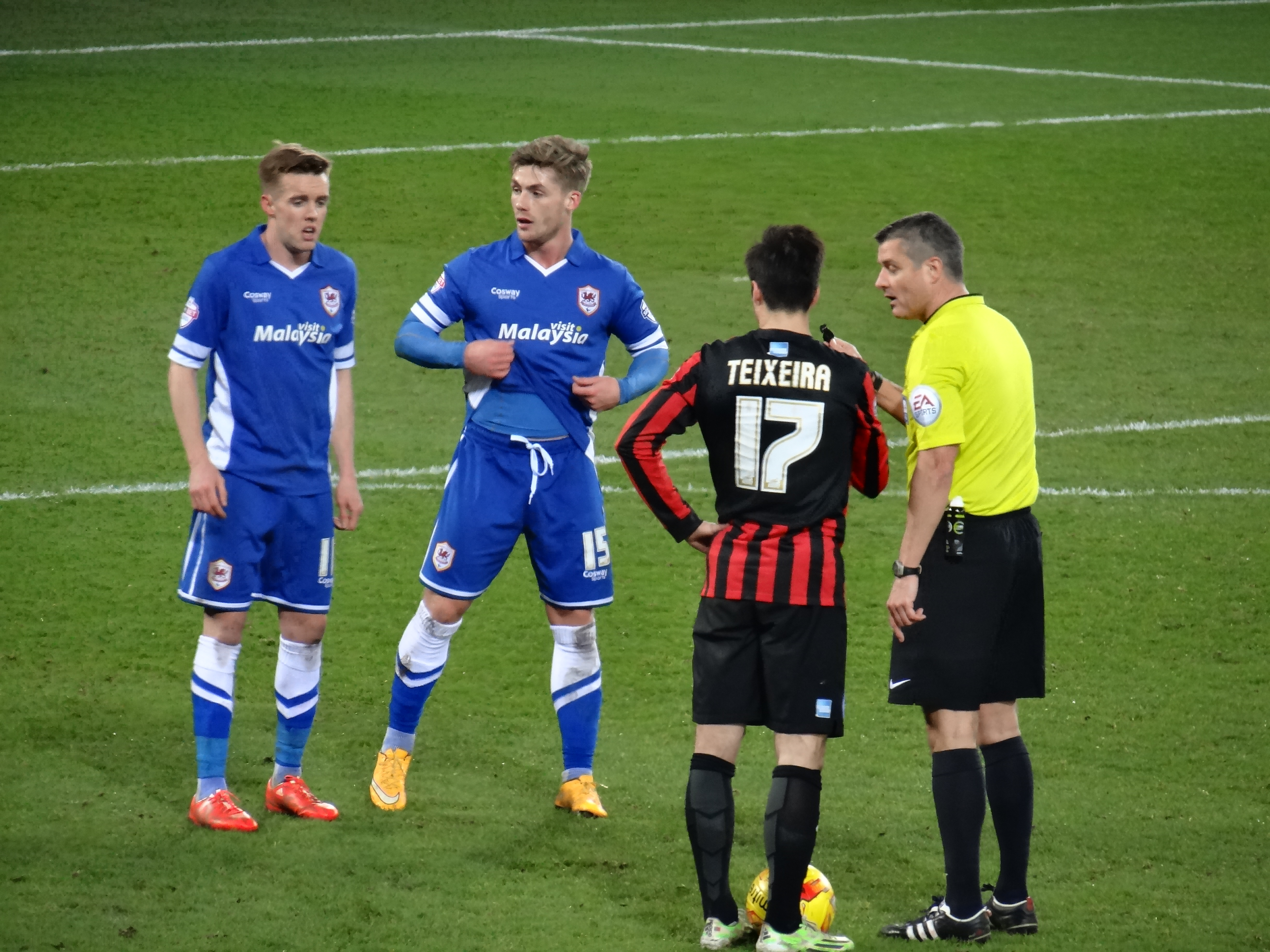
Teixeira preparing a free kick for Brighton against Cardiff City in February 2015

On 15 August 2014, Teixeira joined Championship side Brighton & Hove Albion on a season-long loan deal, signed by former Liverpool defender Sami Hyypiä. Teixeira made his debut the day after joining, coming on as a 64th-minute substitute for Kazenga LuaLua in a 1–0 defeat away to Birmingham City.

On 19 August, he scored his first goal on his first full start for the club, opening a 2–0 victory against Leeds United. He went on to score his second goal for the club just four days later, the winner as they came from behind to defeat Bolton Wanderers 2–1.

Teixeira scored twice in the first half in a 3–2 home win over Ipswich Town on 21 January 2015. A month later, he scored a further two goals for a 4–3 victory against Birmingham. On 14 April, Teixeira suffered a broken leg as a result of a challenge by Huddersfield Town's Nahki Wells during a goalless draw. Ruled out for the remainder of the season, he was recalled by Liverpool. On 20 April, he was voted as Brighton's Young Player of the Year after ending the season as their top scorer in the league with 6 goals. On 19 May, Teixeira was also awarded Liverpool's Academy Player of the Year.

==== 2015–16 season ====
On 28 October 2015, Teixeira made his first start for Liverpool against Bournemouth in the League Cup and assisted Nathaniel Clyne to score the only goal of the game. On 20 January 2016, in a FA Cup Third round replay, Teixeira scored his first competitive goal for Liverpool, the last to round off a 3–0 victory over Exeter City.

=== Later career ===
On 12 June 2016, Teixeira announced that he had agreed to join Porto following the expiration of his contract with Liverpool. His departure was confirmed by Liverpool two days later, with the club due £250,000 compensation.

Teixeira was loaned back to his hometown club Braga on 31 August 2017, for the season. He played 23 times, scoring once, an equaliser in a UEFA Europa League 2–1 win at Hoffenheim on 14 September.

In a surprise move on 26 July 2018, Teixeira joined Braga's local rivals Vitória S.C. on a three-year deal. He did not score until 13 months later, when he netted in home wins over Jeunesse Esch and Ventspils in Europa League qualifiers; 2019–20 was the most prolific league season of his career with eight goals.

On 4 September 2020, Teixeira went back abroad on a two-year deal with the option for a third at Feyenoord in the Dutch Eredivisie; no fee was disclosed. Having not scored in 24 appearances, mostly as a substitute, he returned to his country's top division on 31 January 2022 with Famalicão.

Teixeira signed a two-year deal at Umm Salal in the Qatar Stars League on 27 June 2022. In April 2023, he joined Chinese Super League club Shanghai Shenhua on a contract until December 2024.

== International career ==
Teixeira represented Portugal at every age group from U16 to U21. He was included in the under-17 squad for the 2010 UEFA European Championship. He made his U21 debut in a friendly against Croatia in June 2013, starting the match and scoring in the 84th minute.

== Career statistics ==
As of match played 17 September 2026

Appearances and goals by club, season and competition
Club	Season	League	League		National cup		League cup		Continental		Other		Total	
Club	Season	League	Apps	Goals	Apps	Goals	Apps	Goals	Apps	Goals	Apps	Goals	Apps	Goals
Liverpool	2013–14	Premier League	1	0	0	0	0	0	—		—		1	0
Liverpool	2015–16	Premier League	1	0	4	1	1	0	1	0	—		7	1
Liverpool	Total		2	0	4	1	1	0	1	0	—		8	1
Brentford (loan)	2013–14	League One	2	0	0	0	0	0	—		—		2	0
Brighton (loan)	2014–15	Championship	32	6	1	0	2	0	—		—		35	6
Porto	2016–17	Primeira Liga	8	0	0	0	0	0	0	0	—		8	0
Braga (loan)	2017–18	Primeira Liga	14	0	0	0	3	0	6	1	—		23	1
Vitória de Guimarães	2018–19	Primeira Liga	20	0	2	0	1	0	0	0	—		23	0
Vitória de Guimarães	2019–20	Primeira Liga	21	8	1	0	3	0	5	2	—		30	10
Vitória de Guimarães	Total		41	8	3	0	4	0	5	2	—		53	10
Feyenoord	2020–21	Eredivisie	18	0	0	0	—		4	0	0	0	22	0
Feyenoord	2021–22	Eredivisie	1	0	0	0	—		1	0	—		2	0
Feyenoord	Total		19	0	0	0	—		5	0	0	0	24	0
Famalicão	2021–22	Primeira Liga	11	2	0	0	0	0	—		—		11	2
Umm Salal	2022–23	Qatar Stars League	16	4	0	0	6	1	—		—		22	5
Shanghai Shenhua	2023	Chinese Super League	18	1	0	0	—		—		—		18	1
Shanghai Shenhua	2024	Chinese Super League	25	8	1	1	—		5	0	1	0	32	9
Shanghai Shenhua	2025	Chinese Super League	27	6	2	0	—		9	1	1	0	39	7
Shanghai Shenhua	2026	Chinese Super League	16	3	2	0	—		3	0	—		21	3
Shanghai Shenhua	Total		86	18	5	1	—		17	1	2	0	110	20
Career total			209	38	13	2	16	1	34	4	3	0	275	45

== Honours ==
Shanghai Shenhua

- Chinese FA Cup: 2023
- Chinese FA Super Cup: 2024, 2025

Individual

- Liverpool Academy Player of the Year: 2014–15
- Brighton & Hove Albion Young Player of the Year: 2014–15
