= 2014–15 Brighton & Hove Albion F.C. season =

114th season in existence of Brighton & Hove Albion

Brighton & Hove Albion
2014–15 season
- Chairman: Tony Bloom
- Manager: Sami Hyypiä (until 22 December); Chris Hughton (from 31 December)
- Stadium: Falmer Stadium
- Championship: 20th
- FA Cup: Fourth round
- League Cup: Fourth round
- Top goalscorer: League: João Carlos Teixeira (6); All: Lewis Dunk (7)
Home colours	Away colours	Third colours

The 2014–15 season was Brighton & Hove Albion Football Club's 4th consecutive season in the Championship.

Brighton entered this season having finished in a play-off position in both seasons prior, twice going out in the semi-finals. A new manager, Sami Hyypiä, had been appointed following Óscar Garcia's resignation in the previous season after bowing out of the play-offs to Derby County. A sense of optimism presided the beginning of the season, however it would have a drastically different outcome than was anticipated, as Brighton languished towards the bottom of the Championship table for much of the campaign. A very poor first half of the season, in which Brighton had only won three out of their first 23 games and at one point had gone on an 11-game winless run, culminated in manager Hyypia's demise by December, with the Seagulls in the relegation zone at the time of his dismissal. Chris Hughton was swiftly appointed as the new manager, and he was able to steady the ship in the second half of the season, guiding Brighton to 20th position in the league and, as such, safety for the forthcoming campaign. The Seagulls went on another winless run of seven games towards the end of the season, however previous results proved enough to keep them six points above relegated Millwall in 22nd.

== Pre-season ==
=== Friendlies ===
5 July 2014	Lewes	0–5	Brighton & Hove Albion	The Dripping Pan, Lewes
15:00 BST		Report	Calderón 38'; LuaLua 41'; Mackail-Smith 47'; Fenelon 56', 79'	Attendance: 2,300

12 July 2014	Brighton & Hove Albion	4–0	Partick Thistle	Pinatar Arena, San Pedro del Pinatar, Spain
19:00 BST	Mackail-Smith 43'; Greer 45'; Fenelon 51'; Harris 73'	Report

17 July 2014	Brighton & Hove Albion	1–3	Real Betis	Pinatar Arena, San Pedro del Pinatar, Spain
19:00 BST	Mackail-Smith 12'	Report	Rubén Castro 43'; Casado 49'; Sergio Rodríguez 76'

23 July 2014	Crawley Town	1–1	Brighton & Hove Albion	Checkatrade.com Stadium, Crawley
19:45 BST	John 14'	Report	LuaLua 72'

26 July 2014	Peterborough United	2–1	Brighton & Hove Albion	London Road Stadium, Peterborough
15:00 BST	Assombalonga 56'; Vassell 63'	Report	Fenelon 4'

31 July 2014	Brighton & Hove Albion	1–3	Southampton	Falmer Stadium, Brighton and Hove
19:45 BST	LuaLua 74'	Report	Tadić 19'; Davis 44'; Ward-Prowse 64'	Attendance: 7,296

== Statistics ==
As of 2 May 2015

No.	Pos	Nat	Player	Total		League		FA Cup		League Cup	
No.	Pos	Nat	Player	Apps	Goals	Apps	Goals	Apps	Goals	Apps	Goals
1	GK	(Oman) OMA	Al-Habsi (on loan from Wigan Athletic)	1	0	1	0	0+0	0	0+0	0
2	DF	(Spain) ESP	Bruno	37	3	33+2	3	1	0	1	0
3	DF	(Scotland) SCO	Gordon Greer	40	2	37	2	2	0	1	0
4	DF	(Northern Ireland) NIR	Aaron Hughes	13	0	7+3	0	0	0	3	0
5	DF	(England) ENG	Lewis Dunk	44	7	38	5	2	1	4	1
6	MF	(England) ENG	Dale Stephens	16	2	10+6	2	0	0	0	0
7	FW	(Spain) ESP	Adrián Colunga	21	4	11+6	3	0+1	0	2+1	1
8	MF	(Wales) WAL	Andrew Crofts	8	0	7	0	0	0	1	0
9	FW	(England) ENG	Sam Baldock	22	4	19+1	3	2	1	0	0
10	MF	(Netherlands) NED	Kemy Agustien	3	0	1+1	0	0	0	1	0
11	FW	(England) ENG	Chris O'Grady	33	3	15+13	1	1+1	2	3	0
12	FW	(Scotland) SCO	Craig Mackail-Smith	34	3	15+15	1	1	0	2+1	2
13	GK	(England) ENG	David Stockdale	46	0	42	0	2	0	2	0
14	DF	(Spain) ESP	Iñigo Calderón	41	4	30+5	4	2	0	4	0
15	DF	(England) ENG	Adam Chicksen	10	0	4+1	0	1	0	4	0
16	GK	(Denmark) DEN	Casper Ankergren	1	0	0	0	0	0	1	0
17	MF	(Portugal) POR	João Carlos Teixeira (on loan from Liverpool)	35	6	27+5	6	1	0	0+2	0
18	MF	(England) ENG	Jake Forster-Caskey	33	3	28+1	1	1	0	3	2
19	FW	(Republic of Ireland) IRL	Leon Best (on loan from Blackburn Rovers)	13	0	6+7	0	0	0	0	0
19	MF	(England) ENG	Gary Gardner (on loan from Aston Villa)	20	2	14+3	2	0	0	1+2	0
20	MF	(Northern Ireland) NIR	Paddy McCourt	13	0	0+10	0	0	0	2+1	0
21	DF	(Latvia) LAT	Vitālijs Maksimenko	1	0	0	0	0	0	0+1	0
22	MF	(Netherlands) NED	Danny Holla	27	1	23+1	1	2	0	1	0
23	FW	(England) ENG	Shamir Fenelon	3	0	1+1	0	0	0	0+1	0
24	MF	(England) ENG	Rohan Ince	38	3	23+9	1	2	0	4	2
25	MF	(Democratic Republic of the Congo) COD	Kazenga LuaLua	38	4	15+19	3	0	0	3+1	1
27	MF	(England) ENG	Solomon March	13	1	6+5	1	1+1	0	0	0
28	MF	(Democratic Republic of the Congo) COD	Nzuzi Toko	1	0	0	0	0	0	0+1	0
28	MF	(Israel) ISR	Beram Kayal	18	1	17+1	1	0	0	0	0
30	DF	(England) ENG	Joe Bennett (on loan from Aston Villa)	42	1	41	1	1	0	0	0
31	GK	(England) ENG	Christian Walton	4	0	3	0	0	0	1	0
32	DF	(England) ENG	Rob Hunt	0	0	0	0	0	0	0	0
32	DF	(England) ENG	James Tilley	1	0	0+1	0	0	0	0	0
32	MF	(England) ENG	Elliott Bennett (on loan from Norwich City)	7	0	7	0	0	0	0	0
32	MF	(Argentina) ARG	Emmanuel Ledesma (on loan from Middlesbrough)	4	0	2+2	0	0	0	0	0
32	MF	(The Gambia) GAM	Mustapha Carayol (on loan from Middlesbrough)	5	0	4+1	0	0	0	0	0
33	MF	(England) ENG	Greg Halford (on loan from Nottingham Forest)	20	0	14+5	0	0+1	0	0	0
35	DF	(England) ENG	Glen Rea	0	0	0	0	0	0	0	0
38	MF	(England) ENG	George Cole	0	0	0	0	0	0	0	0
39	DF	(England) ENG	Bradley Barry	0	0	0	0	0	0	0	0
39	FW	(England) ENG	Darren Bent (on loan from Aston Villa)	5	2	5	2	0	0	0	0
43	MF	(England) ENG	Charlie Harris	0	0	0	0	0	0	0	0
Players currently out on loan:
22	MF	(England) ENG	Jeffrey Monakana (at Aberdeen)	0	0	0	0	0	0	0	0
Players who left the club during the season:
30	MF	(England) ENG	Will Buckley	1	0	0+1	0	0	0	0	0

=== Goalscorers ===
As of 2 May 2015

Rank	No.	Pos.	Name	Championship	FA Cup	League Cup	Total
1	5	DF	Lewis Dunk	5	1	1	7
2	17	MF	João Carlos Teixeira	6	0	0	6
3	9	FW	Sam Baldock	3	1	0	4
3	14	DF	Iñigo Calderón	4	0	0	4
3	7	FW	Adrián Colunga	3	0	1	4
3	25	MF	Kazenga LuaLua	3	0	1	4
7	2	DF	Bruno	3	0	0	3
7	23	MF	Jake Forster-Caskey	1	0	2	3
7	21	MF	Rohan Ince	1	0	2	3
7	18	FW	Craig Mackail-Smith	1	0	2	3
7	11	FW	Chris O'Grady	1	2	0	3
12	39	FW	Darren Bent	2	0	0	2
12	19	MF	Gary Gardner	2	0	0	2
12	3	DF	Gordon Greer	2	0	0	2
12	6	MF	Dale Stephens	2	0	0	2
16	30	DF	Joe Bennett	1	0	0	1
16	22	MF	Danny Holla	1	0	0	1
16	28	MF	Beram Kayal	1	0	0	1
16	27	MF	Solomon March	1	0	0	1
Own goals				1	0	0	1
Total				44	4	9	57

=== Disciplinary record ===
No.	Pos.	Name	Championship		FA Cup		League Cup		Total	
No.	Pos.	Name	Yellow card	Red card	Yellow card	Red card	Yellow card	Red card	Yellow card	Red card
8	MF	(Wales) Andrew Crofts	0	1	0	0	0	0	0	1
2	DF	(Spain) Bruno	1	0	0	0	0	0	1	0
18	MF	(England) Jake Forster-Caskey	1	0	0	0	0	0	1	0
25	MF	(Democratic Republic of the Congo) Kazenga LuaLua	1	0	0	0	0	0	1	0
Totals			3	1	0	0	0	0	3	1

== Competitions ==
=== Football League Championship ===
==== League table ====
Pos	Team	Pld	W	D	L	GF	GA	GD	Pts	Promotion, qualification or relegation
18	Bolton Wanderers	46	13	12	21	54	67	−13	51	
19	Reading	46	13	11	22	48	69	−21	50	
20	Brighton & Hove Albion	46	10	17	19	44	54	−10	47	
21	Rotherham United	46	11	16	19	46	67	−21	46 (Note: Rotherham United were deducted three points for fielding an ineligible player.)	
22	Millwall (R)	46	9	14	23	42	76	−34	41	Relegation to Football League One

Updated to match(es) played on 2 May 2015. Source: Sky Sports
Rules for classification: 1) Points; 2) Goal difference; 3) Number of goals scored
(R) Relegated

==== Result by round ====
Round	1	2	3	4	5	6	7	8	9	10	11	12	13	14	15	16	17	18	19	20	21	22	23	24	25	26	27	28	29	30	31	32	33	34	35	36	37	38	39	40	41	42	43	44	45	46
Ground	H	A	A	H	H	A	A	H	A	H	A	H	A	H	A	H	H	A	H	A	H	A	H	A	A	H	H	A	H	A	A	H	H	A	H	A	H	A	A	H	A	H	H	A	H	A
Result	L	L	W	W	D	L	L	D	D	D	D	L	D	D	L	W	D	D	L	L	L	D	D	W	W	L	W	L	L	D	D	W	W	L	W	L	D	D	W	L	L	L	D	L	L	D
Position	18	22	16	13	13	17	18	18	17	18	19	20	20	21	21	20	20	20	22	22	22	22	23	21	19	19	19	21	21	21	21	20	18	20	19	19	19	19	16	16	18	19	19	20	20	20

Updated to match(es) played on 2 October 2014. Source:
A = Away; H = Home; W = Win; D = Draw; L = Loss

==== Matches ====
The fixtures for the 2014–15 season were announced on 18 June 2014 at 9am.

9 August 2014 1	Brighton & Hove Albion	0–1	Sheffield Wednesday	Falmer Stadium, Brighton
15:00	Forster-Caskey (yellow card) 10'; Crofts (red card) 50'; Bruno (yellow card) 74'; LuaLua (yellow card) 82'	Report	Coke 40'; Loovens (yellow card) 55'	Attendance: 26,993; Referee: James Linington

16 August 2014 2	Birmingham City	1–0	Brighton & Hove Albion	St Andrew's, Birmingham
15:00	Thomas 49'	Report		Attendance: 14,955; Referee: Mark Brown

19 August 2014 3	Leeds United	0–2	Brighton & Hove Albion	Elland Road, Leeds
19:45	Austin (yellow card) 4'; Warnock (yellow card) 5'; Murphy (yellow card) 50'; Byram (yellow card) 67'; Pearce (yellow card) 83'	Report	Holla (yellow card) 37'; Teixeira 5'; LuaLua 84'	Attendance: 21,429; Referee: James Adcock

23 August 2014 4	Brighton & Hove Albion	2–1	Bolton Wanderers	Falmer Stadium, Brighton
15:00	Mackail-Smith 37'; Holla (yellow card) 63'; Teixeira 64'; Bruno (yellow card) 87'	Report	Mills 25'; Lee Chung-yong (yellow card) 86'	Attendance: 24,435; Referee: James Adcock

30 August 2014 5	Brighton & Hove Albion	2–2	Charlton Athletic	Falmer Stadium, Brighton
15:00	Forster-Caskey (yellow card) 16'; Dunk (yellow card) 61' (goal) 67', 90'	Report	Vetokele 4', 75'; Church (yellow card) 82'	Attendance: 26,189; Referee: Keith Hill

13 September 2014 6	Brentford	3–2	Brighton & Hove Albion	Griffin Park, Brentford
15:00	Odubajo 18'; Douglas (yellow card) 24'; Gray 32'; Douglas 55'	Report	Dunk (yellow card) 13'; Greer 39'; Baldock (yellow card) 49'; Holla 61'	Attendance: 10,089; Referee: Stephen Martin

16 September 2014 7	Ipswich Town	2–0	Brighton & Hove Albion	Portman Road, Ipswich
19:45	Anderson (yellow card) 34'; Skuse (yellow card) 84'; Parr 79' (yellow card) 90+2'; Murphy 88'	Report	Forster-Caskey (yellow card) 34'; LuaLua (yellow card) 61'; Greer (yellow card) 84'	Attendance: 15,726; Referee: Chris Sarginson

20 September 2014 8	Brighton & Hove Albion	0–0	Blackpool	Falmer Stadium, Brighton
15:00	Baldock (yellow card) 4'; Greer (yellow card) 26'; Holla (yellow card) 57'	Report	Lundstram (yellow card) 70'; McMahon (yellow card) 71'; Miller (yellow card) 76'; Lewis (yellow card) 79'; Zoko (yellow card) 90+1'	Attendance: 24,569; Referee: Keith Stroud

27 September 2014 9	Nottingham Forest	0–0	Brighton & Hove Albion	City Ground, Nottingham
15:00	Fox (yellow card) 40'; Tesche (yellow card) 55'	Report	Bennett (yellow card) 52'; Colunga (yellow card) 79'; Ince (yellow card) 85'	Attendance: 23,811; Referee: Bobby Madley

30 September 2014 10	Brighton & Hove Albion	1–1	Cardiff City	Falmer Stadium, Brighton
19:45	Bruno 20'; Greer (yellow card) 55'; Forster-Caskey (yellow card) 55'; LuaLua (yellow card) 90+6'	Report	Jones 21'; Dæhli (yellow card) 39'; Whittingham (yellow card) 81'; Noone (yellow card) 88'	Attendance: 23,712; Referee: Neil Swarbrick

4 October 2014 11	Watford	1–1	Brighton & Hove Albion	Vicarage Road, Watford
15:00	Doyley (yellow card) 30'; Tőzsér 53'; Vydra (yellow card) 58'; Paredes (yellow card) 65'; Munari (yellow card) 71'	Report	Gardner (yellow card) 51'; Bruno (yellow card) 52'; Dunk 77'	Attendance: 16,531; Referee: Simon Hooper

18 October 2014 12	Brighton & Hove Albion	1–2	Middlesbrough	Falmer Stadium, Brighton
15:00	Gardner (yellow card) 44'; Greer (yellow card) 73' (goal) 88'	Report	Tomlin 8'; Friend (yellow card) 16'; Fredericks (yellow card) 34'; Adomah 53' (yellow card) 72'; Nsue (yellow card) 90'	Attendance: 26,642; Referee: Andy D'Urso

21 October 2014 13	Huddersfield Town	1–1	Brighton & Hove Albion	John Smith's Stadium, Huddersfield
15:00	Butterfield 10'	Report	Dunk (yellow card) 27' (goal) 39'; LuaLua (yellow card) 41' (yellow-red card) 90+3'; Gardner (yellow card) 62'; Greer (yellow card) 79'	Attendance: 10,817; Referee: Gary Sutton

25 October 2014 14	Brighton & Hove Albion	1–1	Rotherham United	Falmer Stadium, Brighton
15:00	Bennett 45+1'; McCourt (yellow card) 76'	Report	Skarz (yellow card) 16'; Revell 48'; Morgan (yellow card) 59'	Attendance: 24,370; Referee: Michael Bull

1 November 2014 15	Bournemouth	3–2	Brighton & Hove Albion	Dean Court, Bournemouth
17:15	Greer 25' (o.g.); Pugh 38'; Kermorgant 76' (pen.) (yellow card) 90+6'; Cook (yellow card) 84'; Daniels (yellow card) 89'	Report	Colunga 28'; Bennett (yellow card) 41'; Baldock 60'; Forster-Caskey (yellow card) 69'; Teixeira (yellow card) 71'; Calderón (yellow card) 75'; LuaLua (yellow card) 90+7'	Attendance: 10,166; Referee: Keith Stroud

4 November 2014 16	Brighton & Hove Albion	1–0	Wigan Athletic	Falmer Stadium, Brighton
19:45	Gardner 1'	Report	Forshaw (yellow card) 70'; Waghorn (yellow card) 79'	Attendance: 23,044; Referee: Lee Collins

8 November 2014 17	Brighton & Hove Albion	1–1	Blackburn Rovers	Falmer Stadium, Brighton
15:00	Dunk (yellow card) 29'; Gardner 42'; Ince (yellow card) 90+4'	Report	Duffy (yellow card) 35'; Evans (yellow card) 40'; Gestede 51'; Baptiste (yellow card) 73'; Conway (yellow card) 90+2'	Attendance: 24,840; Referee: Mark Haywood

22 November 2014 18	Norwich City	3–3	Brighton & Hove Albion	Carrow Road, Norwich
15:00 BST (UTC+01)	Howson 38' (yellow card) 40'; Martin 49'; Johnson (yellow card) 56' (yellow-red card) 90+1'; Hooper 85'; Olsson (yellow card) 87'	Report	Bruno 33'; LuaLua 66'; Colunga 77' (pen.); Halford (yellow card) 87'; Calderón (yellow card) 90'	Attendance: 26,379; Referee: Geoff Eltringham

29 November 2014 19	Brighton & Hove Albion	1–2	Fulham	Falmer Stadium, Brighton
15:00 BST (UTC+01)	Bent 52'; Ince (yellow card) 72'; Colunga (yellow card) 89' (yellow-red card) 90+2'	Report	Grimmer (yellow card) 45+1'; Rodallega 62'; Parker (yellow card) 65'; Christensen 77'; McCormack (yellow card) 81'	Attendance: 28,802; Referee: Simon Hooper

6 December 2014 20	Derby County	3–0	Brighton & Hove Albion	Pride Park, Derby
15:00 BST (UTC+01)	Martin 10', 20'; Russell 15'; Christie (yellow card) 35'; Forsyth (yellow card) 39'	Report	Gardner (yellow card) 8'; Dunk (yellow card) 40'	Attendance: 28,637; Referee: Mark Heywood

12 December 2014 21	Brighton & Hove Albion	0–1	Millwall	Falmer Stadium, Brighton
19:45		Report	Gregory 15'	Attendance: 24,085; Referee: James Linington

20 December 2014 22	Wolverhampton Wanderers	1–1	Brighton & Hove Albion	Molineux Stadium, Wolverhampton
15:00 BST (UTC+01)	Hause (yellow card) 39'; Dicko (yellow card) 51'; McDonald (yellow card) 78'; Batth 88'	Report	Bent 10'; Bruno (red card) 58'; Forster-Caskey (yellow card) 64'; Gardner (yellow card) 75'; Holla (yellow card) 90'; Halford (yellow card) 90+6'	Attendance: 22,882; Referee: Darren Bond

26 December 2014 23	Brighton & Hove Albion	2–2	Reading	Falmer Stadium, Brighton
15:00 BST (UTC+01)	Forster-Caskey 40'; Bennett (yellow card) 58'; Calderón 90'	Report	Murray 1', 26' (yellow card) 44'; Cox (yellow card) 38'; Cummings (yellow card) 61'; Norwood (yellow card) 90+2'	Attendance: 26,173; Referee: Graham Salisbury

29 December 2014 24	Fulham	0–2	Brighton & Hove Albion	Craven Cottage, London
20:00 BST (UTC+01)	McCormack (yellow card) 84'	Report	Halford (yellow card) 29'; Colunga 60' (pen.); March 87'	Attendance: 20,619; Referee: Graham Scott

10 January 2015 25	Charlton Athletic	0–1	Brighton & Hove Albion	The Valley, London
15:00 BST (UTC+01)		Report	Ince 62'; Bruno (yellow card) 74'	Attendance: 17,865; Referee: Lee Probert

17 January 2015 26	Brighton & Hove Albion	0–1	Brentford	Falmer Stadium, Brighton
15:00 BST (UTC+01)	Dunk (yellow card) 45+2' (yellow-red card) 61'	Report	Gray 29'; Jota (yellow card) 61'; Button (yellow card) 90+1'	Attendance: 27,196; Referee: Andy Davies

21 January 2015 27	Brighton & Hove Albion	3–2	Ipswich Town	Falmer Stadium, Brighton
19:45	Baldock 18'; Teixeira 38', 45+2'	Report	Murphy 22'; Hunt (yellow card) 58'; Sears 78'; Bru (yellow card) 90+6'	Attendance: 23,880; Referee: Keith Stroud

31 January 2015 28	Blackpool	1–0	Brighton & Hove Albion	Bloomfield Road, Blackpool
15:00	Clarke (yellow card) 34'; Dunne (yellow card) 54'; Davies (yellow card) 59'; O'Hara 75'	Report	Bennett (yellow card) 84'	Attendance: 10,575; Referee: Seb Stockbridge

7 February 2015 29	Brighton & Hove Albion	2–3	Nottingham Forest	Falmer Stadium, Brighton
15:00	Dunk 42'; Ince (yellow card) 62'; Kayal 90'	Report	Collins 44'; Lansbury 63'; Osborn 86'	Attendance: 26,267; Referee: Chris Sarginson

10 February 2015 30	Cardiff City	0–0	Brighton & Hove Albion	Cardiff City Stadium, Cardiff
19:45	O'Keefe (yellow card) 37'; Peltier (yellow card) 90+3'	Report	Calderón (yellow card) 68'; Bruno (yellow card) 86'	Attendance: 19,206; Referee: Iain Williamson

14 February 2015 31	Sheffield Wednesday	0–0	Brighton & Hove Albion	Hillsborough Stadium, Sheffield
15:00	Semedo (yellow card) 22'; Hutchinson (yellow card) 40'	Report	Kayal (yellow card) 18'; Bruno (yellow card) 43'; Teixeira (yellow card) 90+4'	Attendance: 19,274; Referee: Scott Duncan

21 February 2015 32	Brighton & Hove Albion	4–3	Birmingham City	Falmer Stadium, Brighton
15:00 GMT	Teixeira 8', 58'; Calderón 50', 85'; Stockdale (yellow card) 76'	Report	Donaldson 13'; Thomas 76'; Grounds (yellow card) 85'; Novak 90+2'	Attendance: 25,768; Referee: Gary Sutton

24 February 2015 33	Brighton & Hove Albion	2–0	Leeds United	Falmer Stadium, Brighton
19:45 GMT	Baldock 26'; Kayal (yellow card) 42'; Calderón 63'; LuaLua (yellow card) 90'	Report	Austin (yellow card) 85'	Attendance: 25,274; Referee: Fred Graham

28 February 2015 34	Bolton Wanderers	1–0	Brighton & Hove Albion	Macron Stadium, Bolton
15:00 GMT	Heskey (yellow card) 45'; Clough 64'	Report	Teixeira (yellow card) 45+1'; Greer (yellow card) 74'	Attendance: 14,115; Referee: Dean Whitestone

3 March 2015 35	Brighton & Hove Albion	2–0	Derby County	Falmer Stadium, Brighton
19:45 GMT	Greer (yellow card) 45+1'; Bennett (yellow card) 61'; Stephens 69'; LuaLua 77'	Report	Bryson (yellow card) 31'; Mascarell (yellow card) 62'; Forsyth (yellow card) 80'; Shotton (yellow card) 85'	Attendance: 23,665; Referee: Neil Swarbrick

10 March 2015 36	Reading	2–1	Brighton & Hove Albion	Madejski Stadium, Reading
20:00 GMT	Mackie 24', 56'; McCleary (yellow card) 88'; Pogrebnyak (yellow card) 90'	Report	O'Grady 53' (pen.); Ince (yellow card) 61'; Dunk (yellow card) 87'; Bennett (yellow card) 88'; Greer (yellow card) 90'	Attendance: 14,748; Referee: Andy Haines

14 March 2015 37	Brighton & Hove Albion	1–1	Wolverhampton Wanderers	Falmer Stadium, Brighton
15:00 GMT	Dunk (yellow card) 10'; Greer (yellow card) 42'; Bruno 70'	Report	van La Parra 74'; Doherty (yellow card) 87'	Attendance: 27,019; Referee: Trevor Kettle

17 March 2015 38	Millwall	0–0	Brighton & Hove Albion	The Den, Millwall
19:45 GMT	Woolford (yellow card) 42'; Taylor-Fletcher (yellow card) 59'	Report		Attendance: 9,105; Referee: Andy Woolmer

21 March 2015 39	Blackburn Rovers	0–1	Brighton & Hove Albion	Ewood Park, Blackburn
15:00 GMT		Report	Kilgallon 26' (o.g.); Ledesma (yellow card) 36'	Attendance: 13,605; Referee: Stuart Attwell

3 April 2015 40	Brighton & Hove Albion	0–1	Norwich City	Falmer Stadium, Brighton
15:00 GMT	Greer (yellow card) 20'; Ince (yellow card) 90+2'	Report	Whittaker (yellow card) 28'; Johnson 62'; Hooper (yellow card) 90+4'	Attendance: 28,890; Referee: Andy Davies

6 April 2015 41	Rotherham United	1–0	Brighton & Hove Albion	New York Stadium, Rotherham
15:00 GMT	Derbyshire 8'; Pringle (yellow card) 38'; Green (yellow card) 57'	Report	Ince (yellow card) 44'; Kayal (yellow card) 54'	Attendance: 9,872; Referee: Kevin Wright

10 April 2015 42	Brighton & Hove Albion	0–2	Bournemouth	Falmer Stadium, Brighton
19:45 GMT	Dunk (yellow card) 69'; J. Bennett (yellow card) 90+2'	Report	Kermorgant 70'; Wilson 81'; Smith (yellow card) 90+2'	Attendance: 25,919; Referee: Craig Pawson

14 April 2015 43	Brighton & Hove Albion	0–0	Huddersfield Town	Falmer Stadium, Brighton
19:45 GMT	Carayol (yellow card) 48'; Calderón (yellow card) 67'; Teixeira (yellow card) 76'; J. Bennett (yellow card) 86'	Report	Smith (yellow card) 20'; Coady (yellow card) 34'; James (yellow card) 72'	Attendance: 23,270; Referee: Andy D'Urso

18 April 2015 44	Wigan Athletic	2–1	Brighton & Hove Albion	DW Stadium, Wigan
15:00 GMT	Chow 26'; Perch 81'	Report	Stephens (yellow card) 38' (goal) 55'; Holla (yellow card) 51'; Halford (yellow card) 90+2'	Attendance: 11,100; Referee: Keith Hill

25 April 2015 45	Brighton & Hove Albion	0–2	Watford	Falmer Stadium, Brighton
12:15 GMT	Kayal (yellow card) 43'; Stephens (yellow card) 90+2'; Greer (yellow card) 90+7'	Report	Deeney 29'; Cathcart (yellow card) 61'; Angella (yellow card) 66'; Deeney (yellow card) 87'; Guedioura (yellow card) 90'; Vydra 90+5'	Attendance: 28,841; Referee: Keith Stroud

2 May 2015 46	Middlesbrough	0–0	Brighton & Hove Albion	Riverside Stadium, Middlesbrough
12:15 GMT	Tiendalli (yellow card) 34'	Report	Forster-Caskey (yellow card) 87'	Attendance: 33,381; Referee: Andy Madley

=== FA Cup ===
3 January 2015 Third round	Brentford	0–2	Brighton & Hove Albion	Griffin Park, Brentford
15:00	Tarkowski (yellow card) 56'; Judge (yellow card) 86'	Report	Greer (yellow card) 25'; Baldock (yellow card) 37'; Teixeira (yellow card) 38'; Chicksen (yellow card) 64'; Halford (yellow card) 83'; Dunk 88'; O'Grady 90+3'	Attendance: 8,542; Referee: David Coote

25 January 2015 Fourth round	Brighton & Hove Albion	2–3	Arsenal	Falmer Stadium, Brighton
16:00 GMT	O'Grady 50'; Baldock (yellow card) 72', (goal) 75'; Holla (yellow card) 79'; Greer (yellow card) 86'; Dunk (yellow card) 90'	Report	Walcott 2'; Özil 24'; Rosický 59'	Attendance: 30,278; Referee: Michael Oliver

=== League Cup ===
The draw for the first round was made on 17 June 2014 at 10am. Brighton & Hove Albion were drawn at home to Cheltenham Town.

12/13 August 2014 Round One	Brighton & Hove Albion	2–0	Cheltenham Town	Falmer Stadium, Brighton
19:45	Dunk 79'; Mackail-Smith 90'	Summary	Richards (yellow card) 90+3'	Attendance: 6,595; Referee: (England) Michael Bull

26 August 2014 Round Two	Swindon Town	2–4 (a.e.t.)	Brighton & Hove Albion	County Ground, Swindon
19:45	Thompson 46'; Kasim 112'; Thompson (yellow card) 59' (yellow-red card) 120+3'	Report	Ince 10'; Colunga 95'; Forster-Caskey 100' (pen.), 120+3' (pen.)	Attendance: 5,414; Referee: (England) Andy Madley

24 September 2014 Round Three	Burton Albion	0–3	Brighton & Hove Albion	Pirelli Stadium, Burton upon Trent
19:45		Report	Ince 18'; LuaLua 37'; Mackail-Smith 66'; Calderón (red card) 88'	Attendance: 3,253; Referee: Darren Bond

29 October 2014 Round Four	Tottenham Hotspur	2–0	Brighton & Hove Albion	White Hart Lane, London
19:45	Fazio (yellow card) 33'; Lamela 54'; Kane 74'	Report		Attendance: 33,537; Referee: Mark Clattenburg

== Transfers ==
=== In ===
No.	Pos.	Nat.	Name	Age	EU	Moving from	Type	Transfer window	Ends	Transfer fee	Source
28	MF	(Democratic Republic of the Congo)	Toko Nzuzi	23	EU	Grasshopper Club Zürich (Switzerland)	Free Transfer	Summer	2017	Free	Brighton & Hove Albion F.C
4	DF	(Northern Ireland)	Aaron Hughes	34	EU	Queens Park Rangers	Free Transfer	Summer	2015	Free	Brighton & Hove Albion F.C
11	FW	(England)	Chris O'Grady	28	EU	Barnsley	Transfer	Summer	2017	Undisclosed	Brighton & Hove Albion F.C
13	GK	(England)	David Stockdale	28	EU	Fulham	Transfer	Summer	2017	Undisclosed	Brighton & Hove Albion F.C
38	MF	(England)	George Cole	18	EU	Chelsea	Free Transfer	Summer	2015	Free	Brighton & Hove Albion F.C
—	DF	(Ghana)	Daniel Pappoe	20	EU	Chelsea	Free Transfer	Summer	2015	Free	Brighton & Hove Albion F.C
22	MF	(Netherlands)	Danny Holla	26	EU	ADO Den Haag (Netherlands)	Free Transfer	Summer	2017	Free	Brighton & Hove Albion F.C
20	MF	(Northern Ireland)	Paddy McCourt	30	EU	Barnsley	Free Transfer	Summer	2016	Free	Brighton & Hove Albion F.C
7	FW	(Spain)	Adrián Colunga	29	EU	Getafe (Spain)	Transfer	Summer	2016	Undisclosed	Brighton & Hove Albion F.C
9	FW	(England)	Sam Baldock	25	EU	Bristol City	Transfer	Summer	2018	Undisclosed	Brighton & Hove Albion F.C
—	MF	(Israel)	Beram Kayal	26	EU	Celtic (Scotland)	Transfer	Winter	2017	Undisclosed	Brighton & Hove Albion F.C

=== Out ===
No.	Pos.	Nat.	Name	Age	EU	Moving to	Type	Transfer window	Transfer fee	Source
1	GK	(Slovakia)	Peter Brezovan	34	EU	Portsmouth	Released	Summer	Free	Football League; BBC Sport
7	FW	(England)	Will Hoskins	28	EU	Oxford United	Released	Summer	Free	Football League; SkySports
29	GK	(Poland)	Tomasz Kuszczak	32	EU	Wolverhampton Wanderers	Released	Summer	Free	Football League; BBC Sport
21	MF	(Spain)	David López	31	EU	Lugo (Spain)	Released	Summer	Free	Football League
11	MF	(Spain)	Andrea Orlandi	29	EU	Blackpool	Released	Summer	Free	Football League; Team Talk
9	FW	(Spain)	David Rodríguez	28	EU	Alcorcón (Spain)	Released	Summer	Free	Football League
20	DF	(England)	Matthew Upson	35	EU	Leicester City	Free transfer	Summer	Free	Brighton & Hove Albion F.C
—	FW	(England)	Ben Dickenson	21	EU	Gillingham	Free transfer	Summer	Free	BBC Sport
19	FW	(Argentina)	Leonardo Ulloa	28	EU	Leicester City	Transfer	Summer	£8,000,000	BBC Sport
30	MF	(England)	Will Buckley	24	EU	Sunderland	Transfer	Summer	£2,500,000	Brighton & Hove Albion F.C
28	MF	(Democratic Republic of the Congo)	Nzuzi Toko	24	EU	Eskişehirspor (Turkey)	Released	Winter	Free	Brighton & Hove Albion F.C

EU = if holds or not a European Union passport; Country: when 2 flags, 1st flag = country that plays for internationally, 2nd flag = country of birth; N = number on jersey; P = Position (for position name, pause mouse pointer on abbreviation); Name = Name on jersey (for more extensive name, pause mouse pointer on name); Age = age on the day of the signing; Moving from = only indicate the club the player was playing before start playing for this club in this season, for the type of the moving see Status column; Moving to = only indicates the club the player is going to play next, for the type of the moving see Status column; Ends = when the player's current contract ends; n/a = Not applicable.

=== Loans in ===
No.	Pos.	Name	Country	Age	Loan club	Started	Ended	Start source	End source
17	MF	João Carlos Teixeira	(Portugal)	21	Liverpool	15 August 2014	30 June 2015	Brighton & Hove Albion F.C	
30	DF	Joe Bennett	(England)	24	Aston Villa	20 August 2014	30 June 2015	Brighton & Hove Albion F.C	
19	MF	Gary Gardner	(England)	22	Aston Villa	26 August 2014	31 December 2014	Brighton & Hove Albion F.C	Vital Football
1	GK	Ali Al-Habsi	(Oman)	32	Wigan Athletic	31 October 2014	30 November 2014	Brighton & Hove Albion F.C	
32	MF	Elliott Bennett	(England)	25	Norwich City	1 November 2014	29 December 2014	Brighton & Hove Albion F.C; Brighton & Hove Albion F.C	
33	DF	Greg Halford	(England)	29	Nottingham Forest	4 November 2014	1 December 2014	Brighton & Hove Albion F.C	
39	FW	Darren Bent	(England)	30	Aston Villa	26 November 2014	29 December 2014	Brighton & Hove Albion F.C	
19	FW	Leon Best	(Republic of Ireland)	28	Blackburn Rovers	20 January 2015	30 June 2015	Brighton & Hove Albion F.C	
—	MF	Emmanuel Ledesma	(Argentina)	26	Middlesbrough	19 February 2015	21 March 2015	Brighton & Hove Albion F.C	
—	MF	Mustapha Carayol	(The Gambia)	26	Middlesbrough	26 March 2015	30 June 3015	Brighton & Hove Albion F.C	

Sources: For loan start source see "Start source". For loan end source see "End source".
EU = if holds or not a European Union passport; Country: when 2 flags, 1st flag = country that plays for internationally, 2nd flag = country of birth; No. = number on jersey; P = Position (for position name, pause mouse pointer on abbreviation); Name = Name on jersey (for more extensive name, pause mouse pointer on name); In/Out = In: The player came in on loan, Out: The player went out on loan; Loan club = the club that the player moved on loan to or the club that the player came from on loan; Started = the date when the player's loan started; Ended = the date when the player's loan ended.

=== Loans out ===
No.	Pos.	Name	Country	Age	Loan club	Started	Ended	Start source	End source
22	MF	Jeffrey Monakana	(England)	20	Aberdeen	21 July 2014	2 February 2015	Brighton & Hove Albion F.C	
23	FW	Shamir Fenelon	(England)	21	Rochdale	29 August 2014	8 October 2014	Brighton & Hove Albion F.C	Rochdale A.F.C
21	DF	Vitālijs Maksimenko	(Latvia)	23	VVV-Venlo	1 September 2014	30 June 2015	BBC Sport	
15	DF	Adam Chicksen	(England)	23	Gillingham	14 November 2014	13 December 2014	Brighton & Hove Albion F.C	
23	FW	Shamir Fenelon	(England)	21	Tranmere Rovers	21 November 2014	1 January 2015	BBC Sport	
12	FW	Craig Mackail-Smith	(Scotland)	30	Peterborough United	27 November 2014	23 December 2014	BBC Sport	Brighton & Hove Albion F.C
11	FW	Chris O'Grady	(England)	28	Sheffield United	27 November 2014	31 January 2015	Brighton & Hove Albion F.C	
7	FW	Adrián Colunga	(Spain)	30	Granada	30 January 2015	30 June 2015	Brighton & Hove Albion F.C	
—	DF	Tom Dallison	(England)	19	Dartford	13 February 2015	30 June 2015	BBC Sport; Brighton & Hove Albion F.C	
22	MF	Jeffrey Monakana	(England)	21	Mansfield Town	20 February 2015	23 March 2015	Brighton & Hove Albion F.C	
20	MF	Paddy McCourt	(Northern Ireland)	31	Notts County	21 February 2015	30 June 2015	Brighton & Hove Albion F.C	
15	DF	Adam Chicksen	(England)	23	Fleetwood Town	27 February 2015	29 March 2015	Brighton & Hove Albion F.C	
23	FW	Shamir Fenelon	(England)	21	Dagenham & Redbridge	27 February 2015	28 March 2015	Brighton & Hove Albion F.C	
22	MF	Jeffrey Monakana	(England)	21	Carlisle United	26 March 2015	30 June 2015	Brighton & Hove Albion F.C	

Sources: For loan start source see "Start source". For loan end source see "End source".
EU = if holds or not a European Union passport; Country: when 2 flags, 1st flag = country that plays for internationally, 2nd flag = country of birth; No. = number on jersey; P = Position (for position name, pause mouse pointer on abbreviation); Name = Name on jersey (for more extensive name, pause mouse pointer on name); In/Out = In: The player came in on loan, Out: The player went out on loan; Loan club = the club that the player moved on loan to or the club that the player came from on loan; Started = the date when the player's loan started; Ended = the date when the player's loan ended.
