= Christian Walton =

English footballer (born 1995)

- Walton with Ipswich Town in 2026

Personal information
- Full name: Christian Timothy Walton
- Date of birth: 9 November 1995 (age 30)
- Place of birth: Wadebridge, Cornwall, England
- Height: 6 ft 5 in (1.96 m)
- Position: Goalkeeper

Team information
- Current team: Ipswich Town
- Number: 28

Youth career
- 2005–2013: Plymouth Argyle
- 2013: Brighton & Hove Albion

Senior career*
Years	Team	Apps	(Gls)
2013–2022	Brighton & Hove Albion	3	(0)
2015	→ Bury (loan)	4	(0)
2015–2016	→ Plymouth Argyle (loan)	4	(0)
2016–2017	→ Luton Town (loan)	27	(0)
2017	→ Southend United (loan)	7	(0)
2017–2018	→ Wigan Athletic (loan)	31	(0)
2018–2019	→ Wigan Athletic (loan)	34	(0)
2019–2020	→ Blackburn Rovers (loan)	46	(0)
2021–2022	→ Ipswich Town (loan)	14	(0)
2022–	Ipswich Town	111	(0)

International career
2014	England U19	4	(0)
2014–2015	England U20	7	(0)
2016	England U21	1	(0)
- * Club domestic league appearances and goals as of 22:49, 4 May 2026 (UTC)

Christian Timothy Walton (born 9 November 1995) is an English professional footballer who plays as a goalkeeper for Premier League club Ipswich Town.

Walton began his professional career at Brighton & Hove Albion after graduating from the club's academy, having previously been in the academy at Plymouth Argyle for eight years. During his time at Brighton, Walton spent multiple spells out on loan in the Football League. He had loan spells at Bury, Plymouth Argyle, Luton Town, Southend United, Wigan Athletic, Blackburn Rovers and Ipswich Town. In January 2022, Walton ended his nine-year spell at Brighton to sign permanently for Ipswich Town.

A former English youth international, Walton has represented the nation at under-19, under-20 and under-21 levels.

== Club career ==
=== Plymouth Argyle ===
Born in Wadebridge, Cornwall, Walton began his career with Plymouth Argyle aged 10 and progressed through the club's youth system. He was named in a matchday squad for the first time three days after his 16th birthday for an FA Cup first round tie against Stourbridge, in which he remained an unused substitute, the match finishing 3–3.

=== Brighton & Hove Albion ===
On 15 February 2013, Walton signed for Championship club Brighton & Hove Albion, where he completed his scholarship, before signing a three-year professional contract in the summer of 2013. He was twice an unused substitute in consecutive matches in the 2013–14 season, a 3–1 win at home to Leicester City on 7 December, prior to a 1–0 win away to Middlesbrough one week later. Ahead of the 2014–15 season, Walton signed a new four-year contract with the club on 8 July 2014. He was an unused substitute on the opening day of the season in a 0–1 defeat at home to Sheffield Wednesday.

Walton made his professional debut for Brighton aged 18 in a 0–2 defeat away to Tottenham Hotspur in the League Cup fourth round on 29 October 2014. He made his Football League debut six days later in a 1–0 win at home to Wigan Athletic. Walton made his second consecutive start in a 1–1 draw at home to Blackburn Rovers on 8 November. He returned to the starting lineup on the final day of the season in a 0–0 draw away to Middlesbrough, his first appearance since November. In addition to his four appearances for Brighton, Walton also kept two clean sheets.

==== Bury (loan) ====
On 21 July 2015, Walton signed for newly promoted League One club Bury on a season-long loan. He made his debut for Bury in a 1–1 draw at home to Doncaster Rovers on the opening day of the 2015–16 season. Walton returned to Brighton on 1 September due to an underlying groin injury, having made six appearances for Bury.

==== Plymouth Argyle (loan) ====
On 19 November 2015, Walton joined former club Plymouth Argyle on loan until 3 January 2016 as cover for the injured Luke McCormick. He made his Plymouth debut in a 1–2 defeat at home to arch-rivals Exeter City two days later. Walton started in three further matches, and returned to Brighton upon the expiration of his loan spell.

==== Luton Town (loan) ====
On 24 June 2016, Walton signed for League Two club Luton Town on a season-long loan, linking back up with Nathan Jones who was first-team coach for his first three years at Brighton. He made his Luton debut on the opening day of the 2016–17 season in a 3–0 win away to Plymouth Argyle. Walton saved a penalty from Vadaine Oliver during a 0–0 draw away to Notts County on 29 October to keep a clean sheet for Luton, which extended the club's unbeaten league run to seven matches and earned him a place in the English Football League Team of the Week. He was recalled by Brighton on 31 January 2017 following an injury to fellow goalkeeper Niki Mäenpää, having made 33 appearances for Luton and conceded the fewest goals in League Two during his loan spell.

==== Southend United (loan) ====
On 1 April 2017, Walton signed for League One club Southend United on an emergency loan for an initial seven days as cover for Ted Smith who had sustained a wrist injury. He debuted later that day in a 3–0 victory at home to Oldham Athletic. It was agreed for Walton's loan to be extended by a further week as the club were still without a fit goalkeeper. The goalkeeping situation remained unchanged and therefore the loan was extended by a further week once more. Walton's loan was extended again to enable him to play in Southend's final match of 2016–17, and completed the loan spell with seven appearances.

==== Wigan Athletic (loans) ====
On 12 July 2017, Walton signed for League One club Wigan Athletic on a season-long loan. He made his debut for Wigan on the opening day of the 2017–18 season in a 1–0 victory away to Milton Keynes Dons. Walton finished the loan with 35 appearances, as Wigan won the League One title and promotion to the Championship. He also featured in Wigan's run to the quarter-finals of the 2017–18 FA Cup, playing and keeping clean sheets in a 2–0 win over Premier League side West Ham United in the fourth round and a 1–0 win against eventual Premier League champions Manchester City in the fifth round, as well as playing in Wigan's 0–2 quarter-final loss to Southampton.

He re-signed for Wigan on 22 June 2018 on another season-long loan until June 2019, with a recall option in January. Walton played in Wigan's first game back in the Championship on 4 August 2018 in a 3–2 home victory over Sheffield Wednesday. Parent club Brighton did not take up the option to recall Walton in January. On 22 April 2019 Walton kept a clean sheet in a 2–0 home win over local rivals, Preston North End which secured Wigan's Championship status.

==== Blackburn Rovers (loan) ====
Walton joined another Championship club, Blackburn Rovers, on 23 July 2019 on loan for the 2019–20 season. Walton played in the opening game of the season making his debut in a 1–2 home loss to Charlton Athletic. Walton played in all 46 league matches of the season where Blackburn finished 11th in the table.

==== Back at Brighton ====
Walton played in Brighton's pre season friendly against Chelsea on 29 August 2020 where he came on as a half time substitute for Mathew Ryan. However, he injured his ankle after an awkward landing from a save and was stretchered off and replaced by Robert Sánchez in an eventual 1–1 home draw. On 13 January 2021, Walton made a Premier League match day squad for the first time being named on the bench in the 0–1 away loss at Manchester City. He made his first appearance for Brighton in over five-and-a-half years on 23 January, playing in the 2–1 fourth round FA Cup home victory over Blackpool. He played in Brighton's fifth round tie almost three weeks later on 10 February conceding a 90+4 minute header from Kelechi Iheanacho to knock Brighton out in the 0–1 away loss at Leicester City. He was on the bench for 8 Premier League games during the 2020–21 season without making a league appearance.

He was on the bench in Brighton's 2–0 away victory over Cardiff City in the EFL Cup second round on 24 August, in Albions' third game of the 2021–22 season.

=== Ipswich Town ===
On 30 August 2021, Walton joined Ipswich Town on a season-long loan, marking his eighth loan and seventh loan club during his time at Brighton. He made his debut on 11 September, a home game against Bolton which ended in a 2–5 defeat for Ipswich Town. Prior to Ipswich's next match against Lincoln City he picked up an adductor injury which ruled him out of action for over a month. He made his second appearance for the club on 19 October after the spell out injured, keeping a clean sheet in a 4–0 away victory over Portsmouth. He quickly established himself as the first choice keeper at Ipswich after returning from his Injury, featuring regularly in the league and also in the FA Cup, playing in the first round match against Oldham Athletic and saving a penalty in the match to take the tie to a replay following a 1–1 draw, whilst also starting in the replay with the match ending in a 2–1 away win for Ipswich. Walton also played in the 0–0 second round FA Cup draw at home against League Two side Barrow on 4 December, in which manager Paul Cook was later dismissed. He played in the replay on 15 December in which Ipswich lost 0–2 at Barrow and were knocked out of the competition.

On 19 January 2022, having established himself as the club's first choice keeper, Walton's loan was made permanent with him signing a 2 1/2-year contract.

He continued to feature as Ipswich's first choice keeper following the arrival of new manager Kieran McKenna. He made 38 appearances during his first season at Ipswich, keeping 15 clean sheets, including setting a new club record for the length of time without the team conceding a goal, surpassing the previous record of 547 minutes.

Walton took the number 1 shirt for the 2022–23 season. On 3 June 2024, Ipswich announced that they had triggered the one-year extension in Walton's contract. On 17 August, following a calf injury to first choice goalkeeper Arijanet Muric, Walton started Ipswich's first Premier League game of the 2024–25 season, a 0–2 loss to Liverpool. On 30 December, Walton made his second Premier League appearance for Ipswich in a 2–0 home victory over Chelsea.

== International career ==
Walton was called up to the England under-19 team for a friendly against Turkey on 5 March 2014. He entered the match as a 76th-minute substitute for Mitchell Beeney, the match finishing a 3–0 win. Walton received his first call-up to the England under-20 team for a friendly against Romania, in which he won his first cap. He was first called up to the England under-21 team on 25 August 2015 for their matches against the United States under-23 team and Norway under-21 team. However, he was forced to withdraw from the squad six days later after sustaining a groin injury playing for Bury in a 1–1 draw with Oldham Athletic.

Walton received his next under-21 call-up on 3 October 2016 for two 2017 UEFA European Under-21 Championship qualification matches against Kazakhstan and Bosnia and Herzegovina. He won his first cap and kept a clean sheet in England's 5–0 win over Bosnia and Herzegovina on 11 October.

== Career statistics ==
As of match played 2 May 2026

Appearances and goals by club, season and competition
Club	Season	League			FA Cup		League Cup		Other		Total	
Club	Season	Division	Apps	Goals	Apps	Goals	Apps	Goals	Apps	Goals	Apps	Goals
Brighton & Hove Albion	2013–14	Championship	0	0	0	0	0	0	0	0	0	0
Brighton & Hove Albion	2014–15	Championship	3	0	0	0	1	0	—		4	0
Brighton & Hove Albion	2015–16	Championship	0	0	0	0	—		0	0	0	0
Brighton & Hove Albion	2016–17	Championship	0	0	—		—		—		0	0
Brighton & Hove Albion	2020–21	Premier League	0	0	2	0	0	0	—		2	0
Brighton & Hove Albion	Total		3	0	2	0	1	0	0	0	6	0
Bury (loan)	2015–16	League One	4	0	—		2	0	—		6	0
Plymouth Argyle (loan)	2015–16	League Two	4	0	—		—		—		4	0
Luton Town (loan)	2016–17	League Two	27	0	3	0	2	0	1 (Note: Appearance in EFL Trophy)	0	33	0
Southend United (loan)	2016–17	League One	7	0	—		—		—		7	0
Wigan Athletic (loan)	2017–18	League One	31	0	4	0	0	0	0	0	35	0
Wigan Athletic (loan)	2018–19	Championship	34	0	0	0	0	0	—		34	0
Wigan Athletic (loan)	Total		107	0	4	0	0	0	0	0	69	0
Blackburn Rovers (loan)	2019–20	Championship	46	0	0	0	0	0	—		46	0
Ipswich Town (loan)	2021–22	League One	14	0	4	0	—		0	0	18	0
Ipswich Town	2021–22	League One	20	0	—		—		—		20	0
Ipswich Town	2022–23	League One	46	0	1	0	0	0	0	0	47	0
Ipswich Town	2023–24	Championship	1	0	2	0	1	0	—		4	0
Ipswich Town	2024–25	Premier League	7	0	0	0	1	0	—		8	0
Ipswich Town	2025–26	Championship	37	0	0	0	1	0	—		38	0
Ipswich Town	Total		125	0	7	0	3	0	0	0	135	0
Career total			276	0	16	0	7	0	1	0	301	0

== Honours ==
Wigan Athletic

- EFL League One: 2017–18

Ipswich Town

- EFL Championship second-place promotion: 2025–26
- EFL League One second-place promotion: 2022–23

Individual

- EFL League One Golden Glove: 2022–23
- Ipswich Town Players' Player of the Year: 2025–26
