= Lewis Dunk =

English footballer (born 1991)

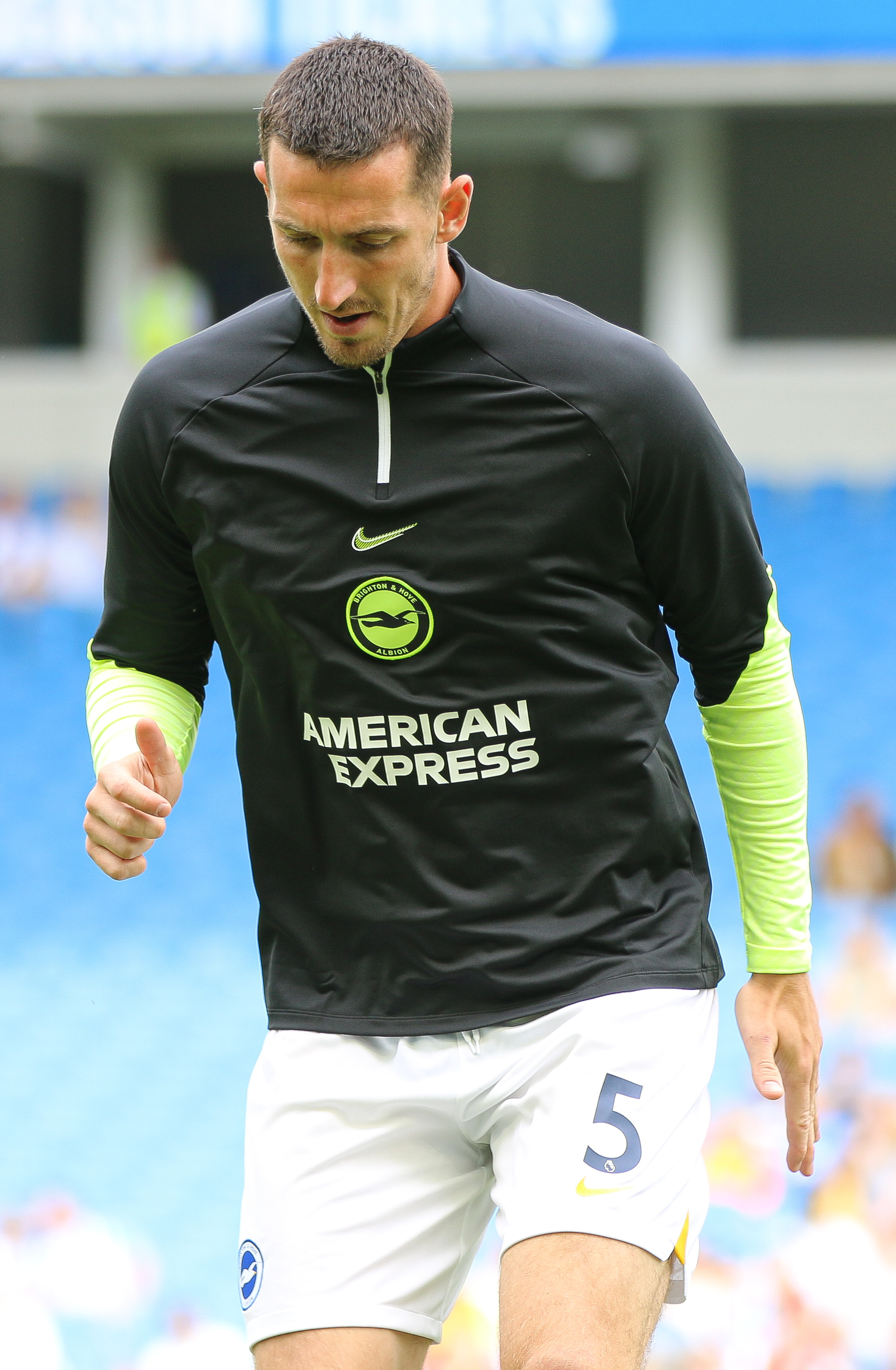
- Dunk with Brighton & Hove Albion in 2022

Personal information
- Full name: Lewis Carl Dunk
- Date of birth: 21 November 1991 (age 34)
- Place of birth: Brighton, East Sussex, England
- Height: 6 ft 4 in (1.92 m)
- Position: Centre-back

Team information
- Current team: Brighton & Hove Albion
- Number: 5

Youth career
- –2003: Wimbledon
- 2003–2010: Brighton & Hove Albion

Senior career*
Years	Team	Apps	(Gls)
2010–	Brighton & Hove Albion	478	(28)
2010	→ Bognor Regis Town (loan)	8	(1)
2013	→ Bristol City (loan)	2	(0)

International career^{‡}
2018–2024	England	6	(0)
Medal record
Men's football
Representing England
UEFA European Championship
Runner-up	2024 Germany
- * Club domestic league appearances and goals as of 8 November 2026 ‡ National team caps and goals as of 3 June 2024

Lewis Carl Dunk (born 21 November 1991) is an English professional footballer who plays as a centre-back for and captains Premier League club Brighton & Hove Albion.

Dunk started his youth career at Wimbledon before joining Brighton & Hove Albion's academy in 2003. He made his first-team debut for Brighton in 2010, and was part of the team that won the League One title in the 2010–11 season.

In the 2016–17 season, Dunk achieved promotion to the Premier League with Brighton, and was named in the PFA Championship Team of the Year. Appointed captain in 2019, Dunk led the club to their maiden European qualification in the 2022–23 season, as they qualified for the following season's UEFA Europa League.

Dunk is uncapped at youth international level, despite being called up to the England under-21 squad in 2011. He made his senior England debut in 2018, and made the squad for the UEFA Euro 2024, but made no appearances.

== Early and personal life ==
Lewis Carl Dunk was born on 21 November 1991 in Brighton, East Sussex and educated at Varndean School. He is the son of former Sussex non-league player Mark Dunk. A Chelsea fan, Dunk idolised John Terry in his youth and named his family dog "Didier" in homage to Chelsea forward Didier Drogba.

Dunk became engaged to his partner, to whom he proposed in 2019, and they later married. The couple have two children.

== Club career ==
=== Brighton & Hove Albion ===
==== Early career ====
Dunk started his career at Wimbledon before he was released following the club's liquidation and relocation to Milton Keynes. After leaving Wimbledon, Dunk joined Brighton & Hove Albion when he was playing for the under-12 team. While progressing, Dunk went on trial at Crystal Palace and impressed the side that they offered him a contract but he rejected the move, citing "school commitment and couldn't travel three times a week up to London" and stayed at Brighton & Hove Albion at a good centre of excellence. He then signed a scholarship with the club. He was promoted to the club's under-18 squad in November 2007.

Dunk joined Isthmian League Premier Division club Bognor Regis Town on loan in early 2010, and made his debut on 8 February in a 3–1 home win over Tonbridge Angels. He scored his only goal on 27 February with a header 1–1 home draw with Cray Wanderers and went on to finish the loan with eight appearances.

==== 2010–2011: First-team debut and promotion to the Championship ====
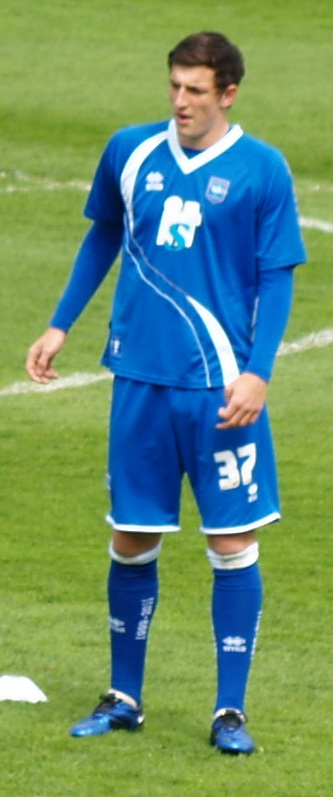
Dunk playing for Brighton & Hove Albion in 2011

On 30 April 2010, Dunk signed a two-year professional contract with Brighton after impressive performances captaining the club's youth team. The following day, Dunk made his first-team debut, starting in the 0–0 draw away to Milton Keynes Dons. After the match, he said: "It's fantastic, the best week of my life. We knew we were being told about pros and I was hopeful but I never thought I would be making my debut. I was told at the same time as I was told about my contract. Playing for my home town club is what I have always wanted to do so it's great. The others helped me along, talked to me all the time and just pulled me through." This turned out to be his only appearance of the 2009–10 season.

At the start of the 2010–11 season, Dunk suffered a foot injury that kept him out for four weeks. He made his first appearance of the season, playing the whole game, in a 1–1 draw against Tranmere Rovers on 2 October 2010. His performance against Woking in the FA Cup on 6 November drew criticism, with manager Gus Poyet saying: "In the first half he did quite well, then, because of the situation, he was one of the players who started to do things he doesn't do normally, changing the ball, going too long, playing with a little bit more risk." Dunk continued to fight for a starting place in the club's defence throughout the 2010–11 season. On 31 January 2011, he signed a one-year contract extension to keep him at the club until June 2013. Dunk made eight appearances in the 2010–11 season as Brighton gained promotion to the Championship as League One champions.

==== 2011–2012: Enhanced playing opportunities ====
Ahead of the 2011–12 season, Dunk stated that he was aiming to fight for his place in the first team at Brighton. With fellow defenders Tommy Elphick and Adam El-Abd sidelined by injury, Dunk started the 2011–12 season alongside captain Gordon Greer, playing in Brighton's first match at Falmer Stadium versus Doncaster Rovers, winning 2–1. During the match, he made a tackle on Billy Sharp which injured Sharp. Dunk apologised when the game was concluded. Dunk was involved as Brighton kept four clean sheets in the first four months of the season. Since the start of the 2011–12 season, he quickly established himself in the starting eleven for the side, appearing in the next two months before being sidelined for one match, due to suspension. After serving a one-match suspension, Dunk returned to the starting line-up against Hull City on 15 October 2011 and helped them keep a clean sheet, in a 0–0 draw. He then set up a goal for Greer to score the club's first goal of the game, in a 2–0 win against Barnsley on 6 November 2011.

Dunk started in the next eight matches by the end of the year and along the way, helped Brighton & Hove Albion keep two consecutive clean sheets against Derby County and Nottingham Forest. This lasted until he served a one-match suspension. Dunk returned to the starting line-up against Bristol City on 14 January 2012 and set up the club's second goal of the game, in a 2–0 win. Throughout the January transfer window, he was linked a move away from the club, as Newcastle United, Cardiff City and Norwich City were interested in signing him, but Brighton managed to keep him. Despite being sidelined on three more occasions later in the season, Dunk went on to make 36 appearances throughout the season, in Brighton's first season back in the Championship. Despite this, he was nominated for the Football League Young Player of the Year award but lost out to Wilfried Zaha.

==== 2012–2014: Depletion in playing opportunities and Bristol City loan ====
In the following season, Dunk's playing opportunities became more restricted; as he fell behind the likes of Adam El-Abd and Matthew Upson in the pecking order at Brighton. On 14 August 2012, he made his first appearance of the season, starting the whole game, in a 3–0 loss against Swindon Town in the first round of the 2012–13 League Cup. Following the absence of Greer and El-Abd, Dunk made his first league appearance of the season against Peterborough United on 6 November 2012 and helped them keep a clean sheet, winning 1–0. He then started in the next four matches before being sent off against Crystal Palace on 1 December 2012, in the eighth minute for a foul on Yannick Bolasie, losing 3–0. After serving a one-match suspension, on 18 December 2012 Dunk returned to the starting line-up against Millwall, only to be substituted after playing 39 minutes, as they drew 2–2. Despite this, he featured nine times in the 2012–13 season.

Dunk's struggles for regular game time continued into the start of the 2013–14 season. On 4 October 2013, Dunk joined League One club Bristol City on a one-month loan deal, to gain some first-team football. He made his debut for the club in a 2–1 away defeat to Wycombe Wanderers on 8 October in the 2013–14 Football League Trophy. Dunk suffered a knee injury and was substituted in the 40th minute, as Bristol City won 4–2 against Carlisle United on 26 October 2013. Upon the conclusion of his loan spell, he then returned from injury for the club's development team on 11 November 2013 against Ipswich Town's development team, winning 3–1. Two months later, on 4 January 2014, Dunk made his first appearance of the season for Brighton, playing 23 minutes in a 1–0 win against Reading in the third round of the 2013–14 FA Cup. Dunk made 11 appearances for Brighton in the 2013–14 season, which included a start on 11 May 2014 in a 4–1 defeat to Derby County in the semi-final second-leg of the 2014 Championship play-offs.

==== 2014–2015: First-team renaissance ====
On 25 July 2014, Dunk signed a new four-year contract with Brighton, which contracted him to the club until June 2018. He scored his first goal for Brighton in the club's first match of the 2014–15 season, a 2–0 win over Cheltenham Town in the League Cup, which marked new manager Sami Hyypiä's first win at the club. Two weeks later, on 30 August 2014, Dunk scored a brace, in a 2–2 draw against Charlton Athletic. He then helped Brighton keep three consecutive clean sheets between 20 September and 27 September 2014. Dunk then added two more goals throughout October, scoring against Watford and Huddersfield Town. After serving a one-match suspension, he returned to the starting line-up, appointed as captain, in a 2–1 loss against Fulham on 29 November 2014. Dunk then captained the side for the next five matches for the rest of 2014. He again helped Brighton keep three consecutive clean sheets between 29 December 2014 and 10 January 2015, against Fulham, Brentford (where he scored) and Charlton Athletic. In another match against Brentford, Dunk was sent off for a second bookable offence, as they lost 1–0.

On 7 February 2015, Dunk scored his seventh goal of the season, in a 3–2 loss against Nottingham Forest. After serving a two-match suspension, he again captained Brighton in three consecutive matches between 6 April and 14 April 2015. Dunk made his 100th appearance for the club, in a 2–0 loss against Watford on 25 April 2015. Throughout the 2014–15 season, Dunk quickly became a first-team regular, playing in the centre-back position. In the 2014–15 season, Dunk made 44 appearances and scored seven goals, making him Brighton's top scorer for the season.

==== 2015–2016: Championship play-off failure ====
Ahead of the 2015–16 season, Dunk continued to be linked a move away from Brighton, but the club stated that they would not be selling him. Amid the transfer speculation, he was fined by Brighton and was placed on the substitute bench throughout August. Eventually, Dunk ended the transfer speculation by signing a new five-year contract, keeping him at the club until June 2020. He captained the side for the first time on 25 August 2015, when Brighton lost 2–1 away to Walsall in the second round of the 2015–16 League Cup. In the absence of Gordon Greer, he captained the club for the next five matches between 20 October and 7 November 2015. In an FA Cup third round match against Hull City on 9 January 2016, Dunk gave away a penalty, as they lost 1–0, and three days later he made a mistake that led to a second goal of the game, in a 2–0 defeat against Rotherham United. Manager Chris Hughton said: "As regards to Lewis, he has been excellent for us. Making any mistakes is part and parcel of the game."

Dunk retained his place in the team and was able to regain his form in the defence. He then helped to keep five consecutive clean sheets between 23 February 2016 and 15 March 2016 against Bristol City, Leeds United (in which, Dunk scored his first goal of the season), Preston North End, Sheffield Wednesday and Reading. He then scored two consecutive goals in two matches between 5 April 2016 and 11 April 2016 against Birmingham City and Nottingham Forest. He was sent off on two occasions throughout the 2015–16 season, both second bookable offence; the first one came on 15 December 2015 against Queens Park Rangers, drawing 1–1 and the second came on 2 May 2016 against Derby County for second bookable, drawing 2–2. The red card in the latter meant that he would miss the last game of the season, an away trip to Middlesbrough in winner-takes-all earning automatic promotion to the Premier League. Middlesbrough were ahead on goal difference and were promoted to the top flight after a 1–1 draw, with Brighton having to compete in the 2016 Championship play-offs to fight for promotion. Dunk scored in Brighton's 1–1 play-off semi-final second-leg home draw against Sheffield Wednesday on 16 May 2016, however Brighton's 3–1 aggregate defeat condemned them to another season in the Championship. Despite this, he regained his first-team place and playing in the centre-back position throughout the 2015–16 season. Dunk made 41 appearances in the 2015–16 season, scoring four times.

==== 2016–2017: Promotion to the Premier League ====
Ahead of the 2016–17 season, Dunk was again linked with a move away from Brighton, with Crystal Palace and West Bromwich Albion reportedly interested in signing him. He started the 2016–17 season well by helping the club keep three consecutive clean sheets in the first three league matches of the season. On 6 September 2016, Dunk signed a new five-year contract with Brighton, contracting him to the club until June 2021. He again helped Brighton keep four consecutive clean sheets between 13 September 2016 and 27 September 2016 against Huddersfield Town, Burton Albion, Barnsley and Ipswich Town. After serving a one-match suspension, he scored on his return to the starting line-up, in a 5–0 win against Norwich City on 29 October 2016. Following this, Dunk was nominated for October's Player of the Month but lost out to Sone Aluko.

On 2 January 2017, Dunk scored his second goal of the season, in a 2–1 win against Fulham. Shortly after serving a two-match suspension, he returned to the starting line-up as captain, helping the side win 2–1 against Sheffield Wednesday. After captaining for the second time, Dunk was sent off for second bookable offence, in a 3–1 loss against Huddersfield Town on 2 February 2017. After serving a one-match suspension, he returned to the starting line-up, in 4–1 win against Burton Albion on 11 February 2017. Two weeks later, on 25 February 2017, Dunk made his 150th appearance for the club, in a 3–0 win against Reading. He formed a partnership at centre-back with new Brighton signing Shane Duffy throughout the 2016–17 season. The club conceded a joint-league best of 40 goals for the season, in which Brighton were promoted to the Premier League. In this season, Dunk was also named in the PFA Championship Team of the Year alongside fellow Brighton players David Stockdale, Bruno and Anthony Knockaert. He also finished third place for the club's Player of the Year award behind Stockdale and Knockaert.

==== 2017–2019: Preservation of Premier League status ====
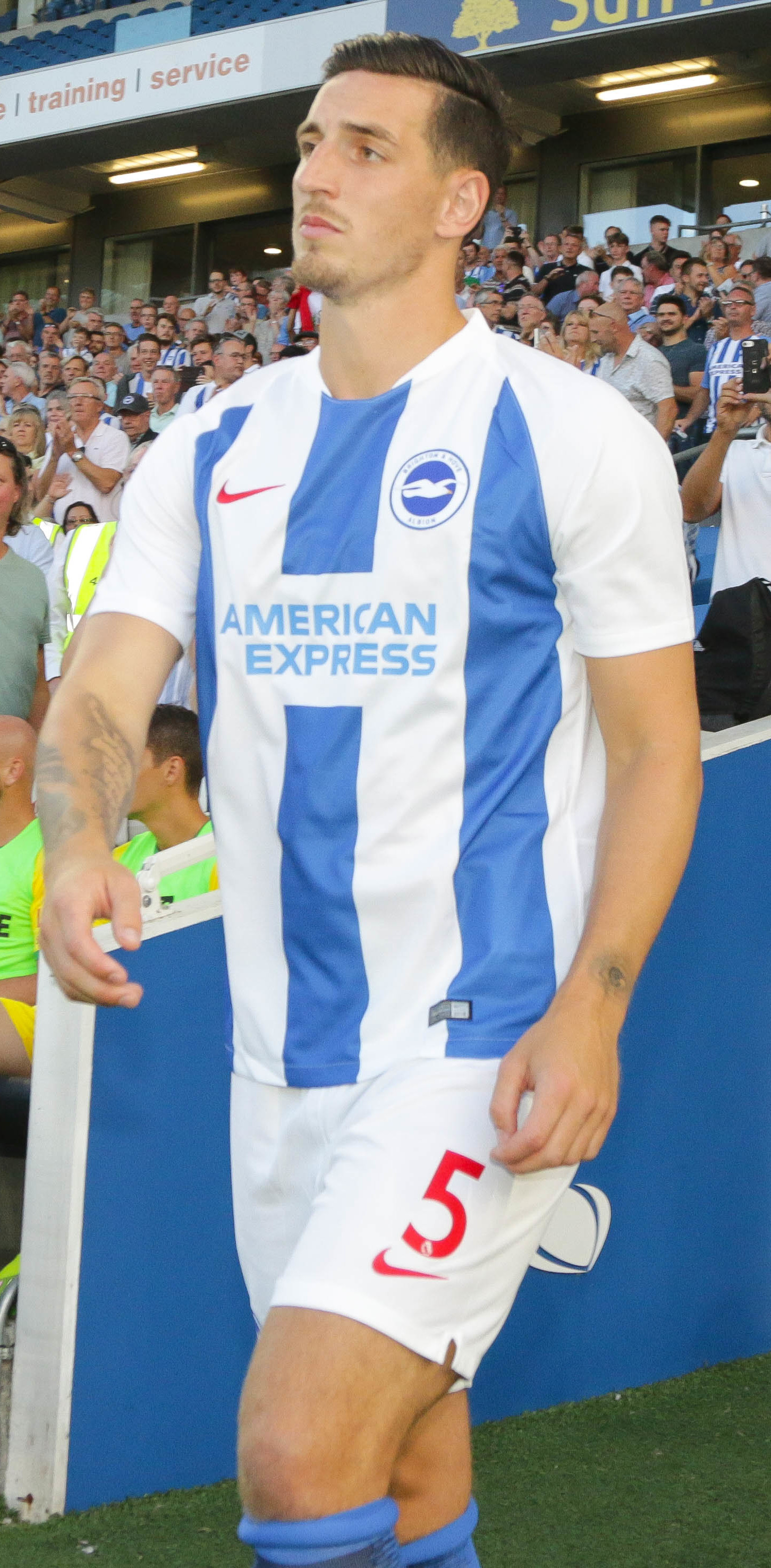
Dunk with Brighton & Hove Albion in 2018

Dunk played the full 90 minutes, and scored an own goal, in Brighton's first Premier League match, a 2–0 home defeat to Manchester City. Five days later, on 17 August 2017, he signed a five-year contract extension, keeping him until 2022. In the absence of Bruno, Dunk took over the captaincy. On 24 February 2018, Dunk scored his fourth own goal of the season in a 4–1 home win over Swansea City, which brought him level with Martin Škrtel at the top of the list of most own goals in a season in the Premier League. He scored his first Premier League goal in a 2–1 victory over Arsenal on 4 March 2018. Dunk played in every match in Brighton's debut season in the Premier League in 2017–18, as the club finished in 15th place on 40 points. He finished second place for the club's Player of the Year behind Pascal Groß.

At the start of the 2018–19 season, Dunk suffered an ankle injury and was substituted in the 20th minute, as Brighton won 3–2 against Manchester United on 19 August 2018, resulting in him being sidelined for one match. On 1 September, he returned to the starting line-up in a 2–2 draw against Fulham. Since returning from injury, Dunk retained his place in the team, partnering Shane Duffy at centre-back as well as resuming his captain duty in the absence of Bruno. On 5 October, Dunk, alongside centre-back partner Duffy, signed a new contract with Brighton, with the pair signing five-year contracts that extended their stays at the club until June 2023. He then helped the side keep three consecutive clean sheets between 5 and 27 October against West Ham United, Newcastle and Wolverhampton Wanderers (Wolves). Dunk's only goals in the 2018–19 season came in consecutive games in November 2018: a 3–1 loss to Everton and a 2–1 defeat to Cardiff City.

On 17 March 2019, Dunk played the entirety of Brighton's 2–2 draw against Millwall in the 2018–19 FA Cup sixth round. Dunk scored in the resulting penalty shoot-out, which Brighton won 5–4 to qualify for the FA Cup semi-final for the second time in the club's history. He captained the side in the semi-final at their first visit to the new Wembley Stadium, with Bruno on the bench, in the 1–0 defeat to Manchester City. Since returning from suspension, he retained his place in the team as well as the captaincy for the rest of the 2018–19 season, helping Brighton finish 17th in the table. By the end of the 2018–19 season, Dunk had made 38 appearances, scoring twice. He finished second place for the club's Player of the Year behind Duffy.

==== 2019–2021: Captaincy and improved league standing ====
Ahead of the 2019–20 season, Dunk was given the Brighton captaincy by new head coach Graham Potter. He subsequently captained the club in their first match of the season, a 3–0 win over Watford, whilst also putting in a man of the match performance. Dunk scored in consecutive Premier League matches for Brighton in November 2019, finding the net in defeats to both Manchester United and Liverpool. In April 2020, he was in talks with the club over a temporary pay cut alongside Glenn Murray due to the impact of the COVID-19 pandemic, a move that Murray described as bringing the "club together even more." Dunk scored his third goal of the season, and was named man of the match, in Brighton's first game back following the Premier League's hiatus caused by the pandemic, a 2–1 win over Arsenal on 20 June 2020; Dunk equalised for Brighton before Neal Maupay scored the decisive goal. He made his 300th appearance for Brighton in a 3–0 home defeat against Manchester United on 30 June. Throughout the 2019–20 season, Dunk retained his first team place for the side, partnering Adam Webster at centre-back, as he helped the club survive relegation once again. Dunk made 36 appearances and scored three times during the 2019–20 season, and for his performances, Dunk won the club's Player of the Year award.

Dunk signed a new five-year contract with Brighton in August 2020. He was sent off for the second time in his Premier League career in the final moments of the game for a late, accidental, two-footed challenge on Gary Cahill in a 1–1 away draw against Crystal Palace on 18 October. Dunk scored his first goal of the 2020–21 season on 27 December, finishing off a short corner to put Brighton ahead in an eventual 2–2 away draw away to West Ham. He scored again two games later, converting another set piece from a corner, with the equaliser in a 3–3 home draw against Wolves in Brighton's first match of 2021. Dunk played in Brighton's 1–0 away victory over defending champions Liverpool on 3 February, to claim their first league win at Anfield since 1982. Dunk made his 300th league appearance for Brighton on 6 February when he scored the opening goal of the game with a header from a corner in an eventual 1–1 away draw to Burnley.

On 27 February 2021, in a 1–0 away defeat at West Brom, Dunk had a goal controversially ruled out by referee Lee Mason after reviewing the video assistant referee (VAR) with the free kick which Dunk scored from was deemed to have been taken too quickly. After being denied the goal against West Brom, he scored his 10th Premier League goal two games later, scoring the first goal in an eventual 2–1 away win over Southampton, on 14 March, Brighton's first victory in the Premier League over their south coast rivals. On 9 May, Dunk scored the opening goal in an away fixture against Wolves, however he was later dismissed for pulling back Fábio Silva who was darting for goal with Wolves going on to capitalise on his dismissal scoring two, going on to win 2–1. Teammate Neal Maupay was later sent off after the full time whistle for confronting the referee, Jon Moss. He returned for Brighton's last game of the season away to Arsenal where they lost 2–0, ending the season in 16th place with a respectful −6 goal difference, conceding 46 goals. At Brighton's end of season awards, Dunk received the 2020–21 Players' Player of the Season, after which he stated: "For your teammates to vote for you, I think it's the best award you can win."

==== 2021–2023: Club's highest league finish and European qualification ====
On 6 November 2021, Dunk played in goal for the final few minutes of the 1–1 home draw against Newcastle, as Brighton had used all their substitutes when goalkeeper Robert Sánchez was sent off. After being ever present for Brighton in the league, Dunk was sidelined for the away match against Southampton on 4 December. It was later announced that Dunk had suffered a knee injury and would not feature again in 2021. He made his return to the matchday squad on 23 January 2022, remaining on the bench in the 1–1 away draw to Leicester City. Dunk made his first appearance since his injury in a little over two months, playing the entirety of the 3–1 away loss to Tottenham Hotspur in the 2021–22 FA Cup fourth round on 5 February. He made his first league appearance since 1 December on 12 February, helping Brighton secure the season league double over Watford with a 2–0 away win.

On 15 February, shortly after Cristiano Ronaldo's opener in the eventual 2–0 away loss at Manchester United, Dunk was sent off for the fourth time in his Premier League career. He was originally shown a yellow card by referee Peter Bankes, before Bankes went to the VAR and deemed Dunk to have denied Anthony Elanga a run on goal. Dunk was only suspended for the one game, a 3–0 home loss against Burnley on 19 February, returning seven days later in another home loss, this time a 2–0 defeat against Aston Villa. He scored his first goal of the season a week later, heading home from a Pascal Groß corner, putting Brighton one behind, but failing to find an equaliser in the 2–1 away loss at Newcastle. On 7 May, Dunk helped Brighton to a clean sheet and their biggest top flight victory in the 4–0 home win over Manchester United. Dunk helped Brighton to their highest top flight finish of ninth in the 2021–22 season after a 3–1 home victory over West Ham in the last game of the season.

On 7 August 2022, Dunk led Brighton to their first win at Old Trafford in their opening match of the 2022–23 season after beating Manchester United 2–1. In Brighton's fifth league match of the season, a 2–1 away loss at Fulham on 30 August, Dunk turned the ball into his own net, making it his sixth own goal in his Premier League career. He scored his first FA Cup goal since 2015 on 29 January 2023, scoring the equaliser in the eventual 2–1 home win over defending champions Liverpool to send Brighton to the fifth round. The win meant he had led Brighton to a draw and two victories against Liverpool in the 2022–23 season. Dunk made his 400th appearance for his hometown club on 28 February, in the 1–0 away win over Stoke City with Brighton going through to the FA Cup quarter-final. He scored his first league goal of the season on 8 April, coming on his 200th Premier League appearance, heading in a Solly March corner levelling the game in the eventual 2–1 away loss at Tottenham.

Dunk captained Brighton to a second trip to Wembley in the FA Cup semi-final on 23 April, scoring in the penalty shoot-out, but ultimately went on to lose to Manchester United to make it two unsuccessful trips to the stadium. On 21 May, Dunk led Brighton to a 3–1 home win over Southampton which secured a top seven finish to qualify for Europe for the first time in the club's history. Three days later, he remained on the bench and was rested for the first time in the league this season. Brighton went on to seal a place in the 2023–24 UEFA Europa League, after a 1–1 home draw against champions Manchester City. Dunk remained an unused substitute again in Brighton's next fixture and the last game of the season, a 2–1 away loss to Aston Villa on 28 May, with it being revealed that he was carrying an injury.

==== 2023–present: Brighton's European debut ====
On 12 July 2023, Dunk signed a new contract that would run to June 2026, with Roberto De Zerbi calling it "good news for Lewis and the club." He missed Brighton's first ever European match on 21 September through injury, where Brighton went on to lose 3–2 at home against Greek champions AEK Athens in his absence. On 5 October, Dunk made his European debut, Brighton's first away match in Europe, in which they came from 2–0 down to draw 2–2 at Marseille.

On 25 November 2023, Dunk was shown a straight red card after having a disagreement with the referee Anthony Taylor over awarding the home side a penalty as his teammate Jack Hinshelwood committed a foul on Callum Hudson-Odoi. This was his fifth red card in the Premier League. Despite this, his team held on for the 3–2 away win at Nottingham Forest. On 24 February 2024, Dunk made in his 400th league appearance for Brighton, in which he scored a header in stoppage time to equalise against Everton.

On 3 December 2025, Dunk made in his 500th appearance for Brighton during the 4–3 loss against Aston Villa.

== International career ==
Dunk was uncapped for England at youth level; his call-up to the England national under-21 team for their 2013 UEFA European Under-21 Championship qualification matches against Iceland and Belgium in November 2011 marks his only youth international call-up.

In October 2018, he was called up for the first time to replace the injured James Tarkowski in the senior England squad for matches against Croatia and Spain in the UEFA Nations League. However, he did not make an appearance. In the next month Dunk was called up again for a friendly against United States and a Nations League match against Croatia. He made his debut on 15 November playing in the whole match in England's 3–0 win over the United States at Wembley Stadium. In doing so, he became the fourth Brighton player to earn a senior England cap, and the first since Steve Foster in 1982.

In May 2023, after a four-and-a-half-year absence, he was recalled by Gareth Southgate for matches against Malta and North Macedonia in UEFA Euro 2024 qualifying. However, he later withdrew from the England squad due to a niggling injury which curtailed his season with Brighton. On 31 August, Dunk was called up for the next round of international fixtures, this time a Euro qualifier against Ukraine and a friendly with Scotland to mark 150 years of the first international match. He made his second England appearance on 12 September, almost five years after his debut, playing the full match of the 3–1 away win over Scotland at Hampden Park. He was named in England's 26-man squad for UEFA Euro 2024, but did not make any appearances.

== Career statistics ==
=== Club ===
As of match played 8 November 2026

Appearances and goals by club, season and competition
Club	Season	League			FA Cup		League Cup		Europe		Other		Total	
Club	Season	Division	Apps	Goals	Apps	Goals	Apps	Goals	Apps	Goals	Apps	Goals	Apps	Goals
Brighton & Hove Albion	2009–10	League One	1	0	0	0	0	0	—		0	0	1	0
Brighton & Hove Albion	2010–11	League One	5	0	3	0	0	0	—		0	0	8	0
Brighton & Hove Albion	2011–12	Championship	31	0	3	0	2	0	—		—		36	0
Brighton & Hove Albion	2012–13	Championship	8	0	0	0	1	0	—		0	0	9	0
Brighton & Hove Albion	2013–14	Championship	6	0	4	0	0	0	—		1 (Note: Appearance in Championship play-offs)	0	11	0
Brighton & Hove Albion	2014–15	Championship	38	5	2	1	4	1	—		—		44	7
Brighton & Hove Albion	2015–16	Championship	38	3	1	0	1	0	—		1	1	41	4
Brighton & Hove Albion	2016–17	Championship	43	2	0	0	0	0	—		—		43	2
Brighton & Hove Albion	2017–18	Premier League	38	1	1	0	0	0	—		—		39	1
Brighton & Hove Albion	2018–19	Premier League	36	2	2	0	0	0	—		—		38	2
Brighton & Hove Albion	2019–20	Premier League	36	3	0	0	0	0	—		—		36	3
Brighton & Hove Albion	2020–21	Premier League	33	5	3	0	1	0	—		—		37	5
Brighton & Hove Albion	2021–22	Premier League	29	1	1	0	1	0	—		—		31	1
Brighton & Hove Albion	2022–23	Premier League	36	1	4	1	2	0	—		—		42	2
Brighton & Hove Albion	2023–24	Premier League	33	3	3	1	0	0	7 (Note: Appearances in UEFA Europa League)	0	—		43	4
Brighton & Hove Albion	2024–25	Premier League	25	0	2	0	0	0	—		—		27	0
Brighton & Hove Albion	2025–26	Premier League	33	1	1	0	0	0	—		—		34	1
Brighton & Hove Albion	2026–27	Premier League	9	1	0	0	1	0	3 (Note: Appearances in UEFA Conference League)	0	—		13	1
Brighton & Hove Albion	Total		478	28	30	3	13	1	10	0	2	1	533	33
Bognor Regis Town (loan)	2009–10	Isthmian League Premier Division	8	1	—		—		—		—		8	1
Bristol City (loan)	2013–14	League One	2	0	—		—		—		1 (Note: Appearance in Football League Trophy)	0	3	0
Career total			488	29	30	3	13	1	10	0	3	1	544	34

=== International ===
Appearances and goals by national team and year
National team	Year	Apps	Goals
England	2018	1	0
England	2023	2	0
England	2024	3	0
Total		6	0

== Honours ==
Brighton & Hove Albion

- EFL Championship runner-up: 2016–17
- Football League One: 2010–11

England

- UEFA European Championship runner-up: 2024

Individual

- PFA Team of the Year: 2016–17 Championship
- Brighton & Hove Albion Players' Player of the Season: 2018–19, 2020–21
- Brighton & Hove Albion Player of the Year: 2019–20, 2020–21
- Premier League Goal of the Month: September 2026
