= Kazenga LuaLua =

Congolese footballer (born 1990)

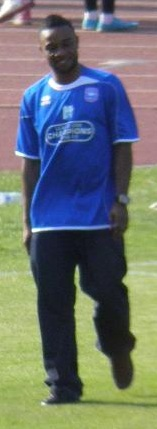
- LuaLua with Brighton & Hove Albion in 2011

Personal information
- Full name: Kazenga LuaLua
- Date of birth: 10 December 1990 (age 35)
- Place of birth: Kinshasa, Zaire
- Height: 1.80 m (5 ft 11 in)
- Position: Winger

Team information
- Current team: Rimal Al-Sahra
- Number: 25

Youth career
- 2005–2007: Newcastle United

Senior career*
Years	Team	Apps	(Gls)
2007–2011	Newcastle United	8	(0)
2009	→ Doncaster Rovers (loan)	4	(0)
2010	→ Brighton & Hove Albion (loan)	11	(0)
2010	→ Brighton & Hove Albion (loan)	11	(4)
2011	→ Brighton & Hove Albion (loan)	9	(0)
2011–2018	Brighton & Hove Albion	127	(13)
2017	→ Queens Park Rangers (loan)	11	(1)
2017	→ Queens Park Rangers (loan)	8	(0)
2018	Sunderland	6	(0)
2018–2019	Luton Town	22	(2)
2019–2021	Luton Town	52	(5)
2021–2022	Gençlerbirliği	23	(1)
2022–2023	Levadiakos	23	(0)
2024	Charlton Athletic	4	(0)
2024–2025	Hartlepool United	7	(0)
2025–	Rimal Al-Sahra	6	(1)
- * Club domestic league appearances and goals as of 14:17, 29 January 2025 (UTC)

Kazenga LuaLua (born 10 December 1990) is an English–Congolese professional footballer who plays for Rimal Al-Sahra as a winger.

== Career ==
=== Newcastle United and loan spells ===
Born in Kinshasa, LuaLua moved to England shortly after his birth. He moved to Newcastle as a youngster, as his older brother Lomana LuaLua was signed by Newcastle United. Kazenga progressed in Newcastle's youth academy, and played for the reserve team. He was called up to the senior squad for the first time for the FA Cup third-round game against Birmingham City on 6 January 2007. At just 16 years and 27 days old, LuaLua would have been the youngest player to play for Newcastle: the record is currently held by Steve Watson.

He was part of the Newcastle youth team that reached the semi-final of the FA Youth Cup in the 2005–06 season. LuaLua finally made his first-team debut on 6 January 2008, coming on in the 74th minute of an FA Cup third-round game against Stoke City as a substitute for Damien Duff.

LuaLua made his Premier League debut on 19 January 2008, coming on as a substitute again for Duff at St James' Park in a match against Bolton Wanderers and went on to make several appearances for the first team later that season.

==== Loan to Doncaster Rovers ====
In January 2009 LuaLua signed for Doncaster Rovers of the Championship on loan until the end of the season. All four of his appearances game in the league where the Yorkshire club finished 14th of the 2008–09 Championship season.

==== Loan to Brighton & Hove Albion ====
On 9 February 2010, LuaLua joined League One side Brighton & Hove Albion on loan, initially for one month. LuaLua was recommended to Brighton manager Gus Poyet by Dennis Wise. LuaLua rejoined Brighton on loan for four months on 30 August 2010. He then made his debut back at Brighton on 11 September 2010 and made it one to remember scoring a rocket 25-yard free kick in style and celebrating with his famous double backflip. He won the Football League Young Player of the Month in October 2010. On 13 November LuaLua broke his leg playing against Hartlepool United in a League One game. LuaLua shortly returned to Newcastle to make his recovery, and expressed his hope that he may play again in the 2010–11 season. Gus Poyet stated that LuaLua played a key part in Brighton's promotion to the Championship.

==== Back to Newcastle after injury ====
LuaLua remained at Newcastle for treatment and made his first Premier League appearance of the season in a 2–2 draw with Chelsea on the penultimate week of the season. It was LuaLua's dangerous run and cut inside around Branislav Ivanović which won Newcastle the corner leading to their late equaliser.

=== Brighton & Hove Albion ===
LuaLua rejoined Brighton on a six-month loan with a view to a permanent deal on 16 July 2011. He signed a permanent deal with Brighton for an undisclosed fee on 21 November 2011. LuaLua scored his first goal as a permanent Brighton player on 14 February 2012, a long-range free kick that tied a home match against Millwall 2–2. LuaLua's goal came two minutes before the end and salvaged a point for Brighton. The next Sunday, LuaLua scored a free-kick into the Kop End at Anfield in the FA Cup, against Liverpool as Brighton lost 6–1. With competition from fellow wingers Craig Noone, Will Buckley and Vicente, LuaLua swapped between starting and coming off the bench as an impact substitute in the following weeks.

LuaLua featured regularly for Brighton in the 2014–15 season, making 38 appearances in all competitions and scoring four goals.

On 7 August 2015, LuaLua scored the opening goal of the 2015–16 Football League Championship, which eventually was the winning goal against Nottingham Forest.

LuaLua made a total of 22 appearances in all competitions for Brighton in the 2015–16 season, scoring four goals.

LuaLua found opportunities limited at Brighton in the 2016–17 season as the south coast club secured promotion to the Premier League, only featuring for the Seagulls five times throughout the first half of the season in all competitions, and he did not make a senior appearance for the club after the month of August.

==== Queens Park Rangers (loan) ====
On 10 January 2017, LuaLua joined Queens Park Rangers on loan until the end of the 2016/2017 season. LuaLua scored one goal in 11 games throughout his loan spell, a backheel against Preston North End.

After Brighton's promotion to the Premier League, LuaLua was deemed surplus to requirements, and as such he re-joined QPR on a second loan spell until January 2018. The loan move was terminated on 1 December 2017, with LuaLua making eight league appearances for the R's in his second spell at the club.

=== Sunderland ===
On 25 January 2018, Brighton and LuaLua reached a mutual agreement to terminate his contract, with it having been set to expire in the summer of 2018. He subsequently joined Sunderland on a free transfer, signing a short-term contract with the Black Cats until the end of the 2017–18 season. At the end of the 2017–18 season, following Sunderland's relegation, he was released by the club.

=== Luton Town ===
On 26 September 2018, LuaLua signed for Luton Town on a contract until the end of the 2018–19 season. He scored his first goal for Luton in a 3–0 EFL Trophy victory over Milton Keynes Dons on 9 October. His first league goal for the club was a 94th-minute equaliser in a 2–2 away draw with Walsall on 29 December to complete a second half comeback from 2–0 down and extend the club's unbeaten league run to 12 matches. LuaLua made 22 league appearances and scored two goals as Luton were promoted to the Championship as League One champions. He left the club at the end of the season after failing to agree a new contract.

LuaLua rejoined Luton on 22 July 2019 after signing a contract of undisclosed length. His first match of the 2019–20 season came in a 3–1 home win over Ipswich Town in the first round of the EFL Cup on 13 August, in which he was substituted at half-time. LuaLua scored the only goal of the game away against fellow relegation threatened Hull City on the second to last game of the season, securing 3 points in attempt to escape the drop. He came on as a sub in the last game of the season in a 3–2 victory over Blackburn Rovers helping The Hatters see out the match and avoid relegation.

LuaLua was released at the expiry of his contract at the end of the 2020–21 season.

=== Gençlerbirliği S.K. ===
After becoming a free agent, LuaLua signed for TFF First League side Gençlerbirliği on the 10 July 2021.

=== Charlton Athletic ===
Having spent a year-and-a-half at Greek side, Levadiakos, LuaLua, joined Charlton Athletic on a free transfer on 15 March 2024 on a short-term contract until the end of the 2023–24 season. His Charlton debut came the following day in a 1–1 away draw against Fleetwood Town.

On 3 May 2024, it was confirmed that LuaLua would leave Charlton Athletic when his contract expired. He made four appearances in total for the League One side.

=== Hartlepool United ===
On 15 November 2024, LuaLua joined National League side Hartlepool United. He departed the club upon the expiration of his short-term contract in January 2025.

== Personal life ==
He is the younger brother of DR Congo international striker Lomana Trésor LuaLua. He is also the cousin of striker Trésor Kandol and former Everton midfielder Yannick Bolasie.

== Career statistics ==
As of 25 January 2025

Appearances and goals by club, season and competition
Club	Season	League			FA Cup		League Cup		Other		Total	
Club	Season	Division	Apps	Goals	Apps	Goals	Apps	Goals	Apps	Goals	Apps	Goals
Newcastle United	2007–08	Premier League	2	0	3	0	0	0	—		5	0
Newcastle United	2008–09	Premier League	3	0	1	0	0	0	—		4	0
Newcastle United	2009–10	Championship	1	0	0	0	2	0	—		3	0
Newcastle United	2010–11	Premier League	2	0	0	0	1	0	—		3	0
Newcastle United	2011–12	Premier League	0	0	0	0	0	0	—		0	0
Newcastle United	Total		8	0	4	0	3	0	—		15	0
Doncaster Rovers (loan)	2008–09	Championship	4	0	—		—		—		4	0
Brighton & Hove Albion (loan)	2009–10	League One	11	0	—		—		—		11	0
Brighton & Hove Albion (loan)	2010–11	League One	11	4	—		0	0	—		11	4
Brighton & Hove Albion (loan)	2011–12	Championship	9	0	—		2	0	—		11	0
Brighton & Hove Albion	2011–12	Championship	18	1	2	1	—		—		20	2
Brighton & Hove Albion	2012–13	Championship	22	5	2	0	0	0	2 (Note: Appearances in the Championship play-offs)	0	26	5
Brighton & Hove Albion	2013–14	Championship	32	1	4	0	1	0	2	1	39	2
Brighton & Hove Albion	2014–15	Championship	34	3	0	0	4	1	—		38	4
Brighton & Hove Albion	2015–16	Championship	18	3	1	0	2	1	1	0	22	4
Brighton & Hove Albion	2016–17	Championship	3	0	0	0	2	1	—		5	1
Brighton & Hove Albion	2017–18	Premier League	0	0	0	0	—		—		0	0
Brighton & Hove Albion	Total		158	17	9	1	11	3	5	1	183	22
Brighton & Hove Albion U21	2016–17	—			—		—		2 (Note: Appearances in the EFL Trophy)	0	2	0
Queens Park Rangers (loan)	2016–17	Championship	11	1	—		—		—		11	1
Queens Park Rangers (loan)	2017–18	Championship	8	0	—		0	0	—		8	0
Queens Park Rangers (loan)	Total		19	1	0	0	0	0	0	0	19	1
Sunderland	2017–18	Championship	6	0	—		—		—		6	0
Luton Town	2018–19	League One	22	2	3	0	—		3	1	28	3
Luton Town	2019–20	Championship	29	3	0	0	2	0	—		31	3
Luton Town	2020–21	Championship	23	2	2	0	3	0	—		28	2
Luton Town	Total		74	7	5	0	5	0	3	1	87	8
Gençlerbirliği	2021–22	TFF First League	23	1	0	0	—		—		23	1
Levadiakos	2022–23	Super League Greece	18	0	3	0	—		—		21	0
Levadiakos	2023–24	Super League Greece 2	5	0	1	0	—		—		6	0
Levadiakos	Total		23	0	4	0	0	0	0	0	27	0
Charlton Athletic	2023–24	League One	4	0	—		—		—		4	0
Hartlepool United	2024–25	National League	7	0	—		—		1 (Note: Appearance in the FA Trophy)	0	8	0
Career total			326	26	22	1	19	3	11	2	378	32

== Honours ==
Brighton & Hove Albion

- Football League One: 2010–11

Luton Town

- EFL League One: 2018–19
