= Danny Holla =

Dutch footballer

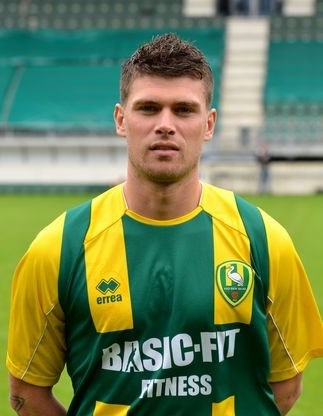
- Holla with ADO Den Haag in 2012

Personal information
- Full name: Danny Holla
- Date of birth: 31 December 1987 (age 38)
- Place of birth: Almere, Netherlands
- Height: 1.81 m (5 ft 11 1/2 in)
- Position: Defensive midfielder

Youth career
- Buitenboys
- Omniworld
- 2002–2006: Groningen

Senior career*
Years	Team	Apps	(Gls)
2006–2012	Groningen	97	(9)
2007–2008	→ Zwolle (loan)	23	(8)
2012	→ VVV (loan)	16	(2)
2012–2014	ADO Den Haag	54	(14)
2014–2016	Brighton	33	(1)
2016–2017	PEC Zwolle	25	(3)
2017–2018	Twente	25	(2)
2018–2019	Den Bosch	25	(2)
2020–2022	Sliema Wanderers	31	(5)
Total		329	(46)

International career
2006	Netherlands U23	1	(0)
- * Club domestic league appearances and goals as of 5 June 2023

Danny Holla (born 31 December 1987) is a Dutch retired footballer who last played as a midfielder for Sliema Wanderers in the Maltese Premier League.

== Club career ==
=== Early career ===
Born in Almere, Flevoland, Holla started his career at FC Groningen. He played on loan to FC Zwolle during the first half of the 2007–08 season, but returned to parent club Groningen to replace Rasmus Lindgren, who had moved to Ajax. During the second half of the 2011–12 season, he was sent on loan again, this time to VVV-Venlo.

=== Brighton & Hove Albion ===
In June 2012, Holla signed with ADO Den Haag before transferring to English club Brighton & Hove Albion during August 2014. He scored his first goal for the club in a 3–2 loss against Brentford. His contract with Brighton & Hove Albion was terminated by mutual consent on 25 August 2016.

=== Melbourne Victory ===
In July 2018, Holla joined Australian club Melbourne Victory on a free transfer, signing a one-year contract, hoping to stay for longer. However, it was reported that the deal had fallen through and that the Dutchman admitted to abandoning contract negotiations.

=== Den Bosch ===
In late August 2018, after spells with Twente and PEC Zwolle, he joined Den Bosch. He was released by Den Bosch on 1 July 2019.

=== Sliema Wanderers ===
Holla joined Maltese club Sliema Wanderers in September 2020. He extended his contract with the Wanderers for the 2021–22 season on 18 August 2021. He was released on July 1, 2022. He hung up his boots in 2023.

== International career ==
Holla was capped once by the Netherlands national under-23 football team.
