= Jiří Skalák =

Czech footballer

Personal information
- Date of birth: 12 March 1992 (age 34)
- Place of birth: Pardubice, Czechoslovakia
- Height: 1.76 m (5 ft 9 in)
- Position: Winger

Team information
- Current team: Dynamo České Budějovice
- Number: 9

Youth career
- Sparta Prague

Senior career*
Years	Team	Apps	(Gls)
2010–2015	Sparta Prague B	30	(4)
2010–2015	Sparta Prague	10	(0)
2011–2012	→ Ružomberok (loan)	27	(3)
2013	→ Slovácko (loan)	9	(0)
2013–2014	→ Zbrojovka Brno (loan)	24	(3)
2014–2015	→ Mladá Boleslav (loan)	24	(6)
2015–2016	Mladá Boleslav	16	(6)
2016–2018	Brighton & Hove Albion	43	(2)
2018–2021	Millwall	28	(1)
2021–2023	Mladá Boleslav	63	(4)
2023–	Dynamo České Budějovice	55	(4)

International career
2007–2008	Czech Republic U16	6	(5)
2008	Czech Republic U17	4	(0)
2009	Czech Republic U18	5	(0)
2009–2011	Czech Republic U19	24	(3)
2012	Czech Republic U20	1	(1)
2012–2015	Czech Republic U21	17	(1)
2015–2018	Czech Republic	17	(0)
- * Club domestic league appearances and goals as of 28 May 2026

Jiří Skalák (born 12 March 1992) is a Czech professional footballer who plays as a winger for Czech First League side Dynamo České Budějovice. He has represented the Czech Republic internationally at youth levels U16 through U21.

== Club career ==
=== Early career ===
Skalák began his professional career at AC Sparta Prague, and spent time on loan at MFK Ružomberok, 1. FC Slovácko, FC Zbrojovka Brno and FK Mladá Boleslav before joining Mladá Boleslav permanently in 2015.

=== Brighton & Hove Albion ===
Skalák joined Football League Championship side Brighton & Hove Albion on 1 February 2016 for an undisclosed fee, believed to be £1.2 million. He scored his first goal for the club in a 4–0 win over QPR on 19 April 2016. Although he featured 31 times in Brighton's promotion-winning 2016–17 season, he only took part in cup games the following season, as Brighton played in the Premier League.

=== Millwall ===
On 2 August 2018, Skalák joined Championship side Millwall for an undisclosed fee. He was originally credited with his first goal for the club in a 1–1 home draw against Bolton on 24 November 2018, but the goal was later claimed by teammate Jake Cooper. He eventually scored his first league goal for Millwall on 22 July 2020, the final day of the extended 2019–20 season in a 4–1 win against Huddersfield.

=== Mladá Boleslav ===
On 8 February 2021, Skalák joined Czech First League side FK Mladá Boleslav for an undisclosed fee.

=== České Budějovice ===
On 18 August 2023, Skalák signed a one-year contract with last team of the league table Dynamo České Budějovice.

== International career ==
Skalák represented his country on all youth levels from under-16 to under-21. He was called up for the senior national team for the first time on 25 August 2015 to face Latvia and Kazakhstan in the UEFA Euro 2016 qualifying round but did not play in those matches.

== Career statistics ==
As of 3 December 2020

Appearances and goals by club, season and competition
Club	Season	League			National cup		League cup		Other		Total	
Club	Season	Division	Apps	Goals	Apps	Goals	Apps	Goals	Apps	Goals	Apps	Goals
Sparta Prague B	2009–10	Czech 2. Liga	4	0	0	0	—		—		4	0
Sparta Prague B	2010–11	Czech 2. Liga	25	3	0	0	—		—		25	3
Sparta Prague B	2011–12	Czech 2. Liga	1	1	0	0	—		—		1	1
Sparta Prague B	Total		30	4	0	0	—		—		30	4
Sparta Prague	2012–13	Czech First League	7	0	1	0	—		7	0	15	0
Sparta Prague	2013–14	Czech First League	3	0	0	0	—		1	0	4	0
Sparta Prague	Total		10	0	1	0	—		8	0	19	0
MFK Ružomberok (loan)	2011–12	Slovak Super Liga	27	3	0	0	—		—		27	3
Slovácko (loan)	2012–13	Czech First League	9	0	2	0	—		—		11	0
Zbrojovka Brno (loan)	2013–14	Czech First League	24	3	7	1	—		—		31	4
Mladá Boleslav (loan)	2014–15	Czech First League	24	6	4	3	0	0	4	2	32	11
Mladá Boleslav	2015–16	Czech First League	16	6	2	1	0	0	1	0	19	7
Brighton & Hove Albion	2015–16	Championship	12	2	0	0	0	0	2	0	14	2
Brighton & Hove Albion	2016–17	Championship	31	0	1	0	1	0	0	0	33	1
Brighton & Hove Albion	2017–18	Premier League	0	0	1	0	2	0	0	0	3	0
Brighton & Hove Albion	Total		43	2	2	0	3	0	2	0	50	3
Millwall	2018–19	Championship	14	0	2	0	3	0	0	0	19	0
Millwall	2019–20	Championship	12	1	1	0	1	0	0	0	14	1
Millwall	2020–21	Championship	2	0	0	0	1	0	0	0	3	0
Millwall	Total		28	1	3	0	5	0	0	0	36	1
Mladá Boleslav	2020–21	Czech First League	0	0	0	0	0	0	0	0	0	0
Career total			211	25	21	5	8	0	15	2	255	32

== Honors ==
Czech Republic U19

- UEFA European Under-19 Championship runner-up 2011
