= Beram Kayal =

Israeli footballer

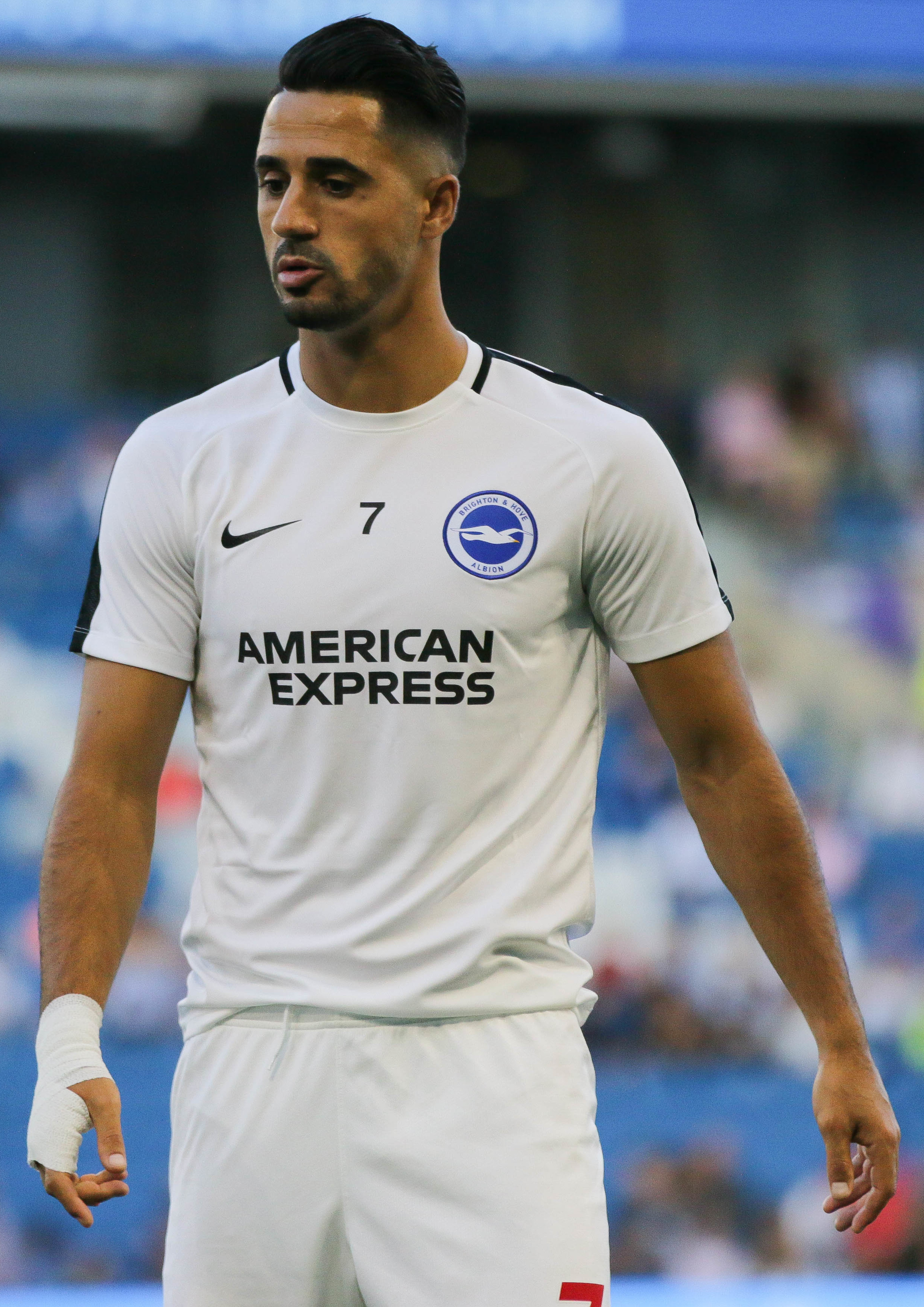
- Kayal playing for Brighton & Hove Albion in 2018

Personal information
- Full name: Beram Kayal
- Date of birth: 2 May 1988 (age 38)
- Place of birth: Jadeidi-Makr, Israel
- Height: 1.78 m (5 ft 10 in)
- Position: Central midfielder

Youth career
- 2002–2006: Maccabi Haifa

Senior career*
Years	Team	Apps	(Gls)
2005–2010	Maccabi Haifa	92	(6)
2010–2015	Celtic	86	(2)
2015–2020	Brighton & Hove Albion	118	(4)
2019–2020	→ Charlton Athletic (loan)	6	(0)
2020–2025	Bnei Sakhnin	81	(14)
Total		383	(26)

International career^{‡}
2004–2005	Israel U17	12	(1)
2006	Israel U18	4	(1)
2005–2007	Israel U19	23	(7)
2007–2009	Israel U21	11	(1)
2008–2021	Israel	47	(2)
- * Club domestic league appearances and goals as of 15 April 2025 ‡ National team caps and goals as of 5 April 2025 (UTC)

Beram Kayal (or Biram Keyal, Arabic: بيرم كيال, Hebrew: בירם כיאל; born 2 May 1988) is an Israeli former professional footballer who played as a central midfielder. Internationally he played for Israel, where he has been a full international since 2008, with 47 senior caps to 2021.

Kayal joined Maccabi Haifa in 2002 and made his professional debut in 2006 at the age of 18. He made 125 appearances and scored eight goals before moving to Celtic in 2010. He has received plaudits from many Scottish football pundits and was named the SPL player of the month for January 2011. In January 2015, he joined Brighton & Hove Albion where he spent five and a half years – including a loan spell at Charlton Athletic – helping The Seagulls to Premier League promotion for the first time in the club's history. Kayal made a return to Israel in November 2020 signing for Bnei Sakhnin of the Israeli top flight.

== Early and personal life ==
Kayal was born in Jadeidi-Makr, Israel, to a Muslim-Arab family, and is an Arab-Israeli citizen.

== Club career ==
=== Maccabi Haifa ===
Kayal started his career as a striker in the various Youth teams of Maccabi Haifa and scored many goals before taking on the role of a midfielder. Despite only being 16 years old at the time, he moved up to the Maccabi Haifa under-19 team for the 2004–05 campaign and excelled as part of the team that won a League and Cup double. Kayal was named the League's Outstanding Player.

He made his first-team debut for Maccabi Haifa at the end of the 2005–06 season in a 2–1 win over Maccabi Petah Tikva which sealed Haifa's third League title in a row at the age of 17 making two appearances that season. In the 2006–07 season, he made six appearances in all competitions, but took on the role of captain of the under-19 team that won another League and Cup double. He scored a hat-trick in a league win against Beitar Jerusalem.

In the 2007–08 season Kayal became a first team regular featuring 36 times in the first-team. After that he became an integral part of the team and enjoyed success in subsequent seasons winning the Premier League and Toto Cup.

During the 2007 Torneo di Viareggio youth tournament in Italy, Kayal was praised by the Italian press for a Man of the match performance against their counterparts from Fiorentina. Both Corriere della Sera and Gazzetta dello Sport seemed to be astonished to learn that he was an Arab on an Israeli team and took a great amount of time to learn more about him.

In the 2009–10 season, Maccabi Haifa lost the Premier League championship on the last matchday, when Hapoel Tel Aviv scored in the 92nd minute to beat Beitar Jerusalem.

=== Celtic ===
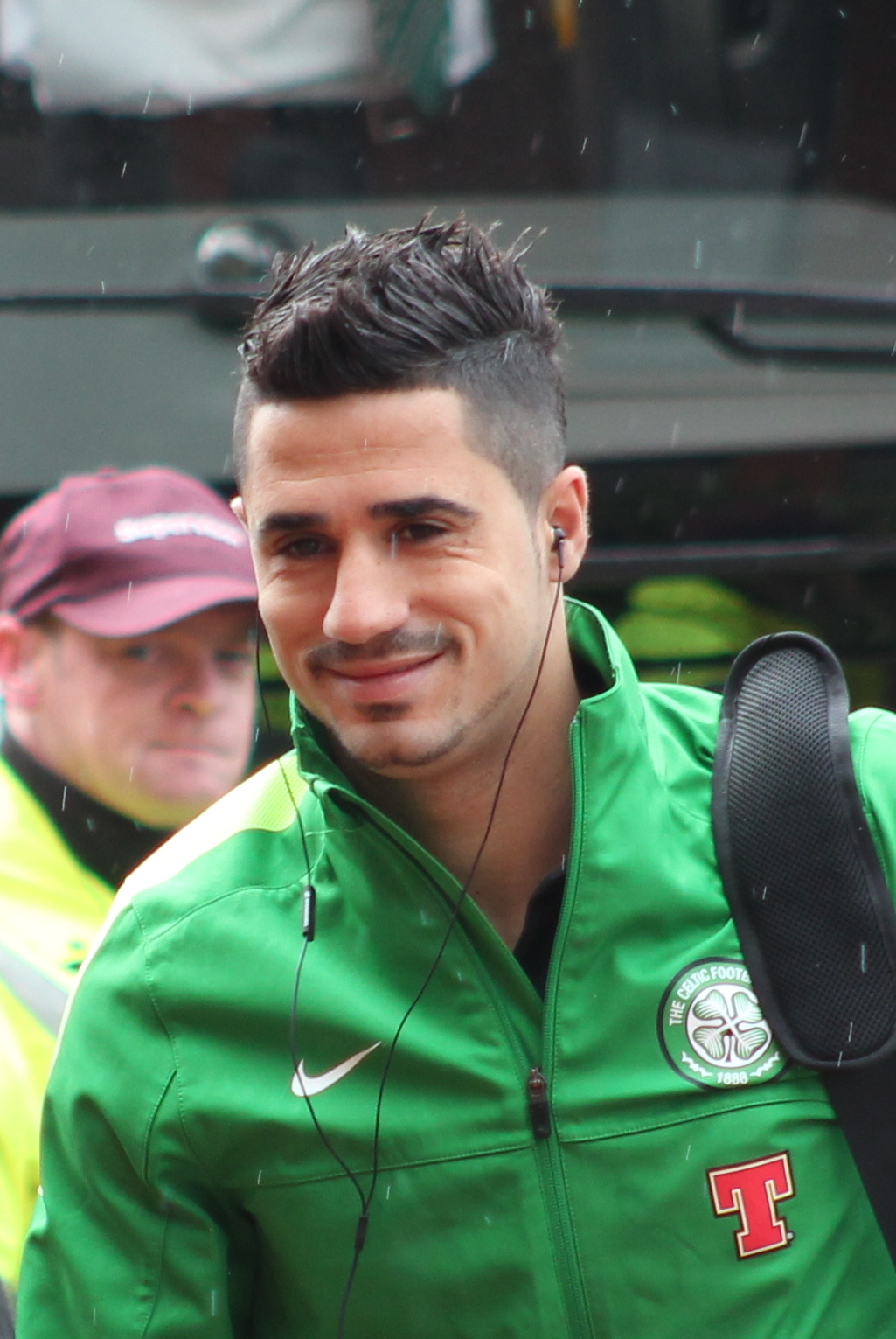
Kayal playing for Celtic in 2012

On 29 July 2010, Kayal signed a four-year deal with Scottish Premier League side Celtic and was given the number 33 shirt. The transfer fee paid to Maccabi Haifa was reported as £1.2 million.

Kayal made his debut for Celtic against FC Utrecht on 19 August 2010 and showed his full potential by getting off to the best possible start, setting up the opening goal of the game for Efraín Juárez and winning the Man of the Match award. In September 2010 he was out of action for three months due to a hernia injury which required surgery. He made his return as a substitute on 26 December against St Johnstone, and was restored to the starting line-up in a 2–0 win over Rangers at Ibrox on 2 January 2011.

His performances won him the SPL Player of the Month award for January 2011, and the praise of Celtic manager Neil Lennon. His determination and competitive attitude played a key part in his side's success in his first season in Scottish football. On 9 April 2011, Kayal captained the side in a 1–0 win over St Mirren. He scored his first goal for Celtic in a 1–0 SPL win over St Johnstone on 12 April 2011. His first home goal was a long range effort against Dundee United on 1 May 2011. On 4 May, Kayal had to be taken off in the second half of an SPL match against Inverness Caledonian Thistle because of suspected concussion after a collision with Ross Tokely. Kayal sustained a fractured wrist in the same incident and subsequently missed the rest of the 2010–11 season.

Kayal captained Celtic for the second time on 10 September 2011, against Motherwell in the SPL, leading the team to a 4–0 victory at Celtic Park. He was made captain while Scott Brown was out with an ankle injury.

Kayal suffered ankle ligament damage against Rangers on 28 December 2011 after a tackle by Lee McCulloch and was stretchered off with 13 minutes to play. Celtic won the match 1–0 which sent them top of the SPL table. The injury put Kayal out of action for over four months and he returned to the side only in the last game of the season, a 5–0 win over Heart of Midlothian. Later, Kayal accused McCulloch of deliberately injuring him and that he had "not forgotten that for a moment."

In the 2012 season, Kayal obtained European nationality and played an important role for the team during the Scottish League.

On 22 October 2013, he scored his first goal in the UEFA Champions League against Ajax in a 2–1 win.

=== Brighton & Hove Albion ===
On 23 January 2015, Kayal signed for Brighton & Hove Albion on a two-and-a-half-year deal, for an undisclosed fee. He made his debut on 7 February, scoring a consolation goal for Brighton in a 2–3 defeat at home against Nottingham Forest. On 18 August, he scored within 14 seconds away to Huddersfield Town, albeit in a 1–1 draw. Brighton narrowly missed out on automatic promotion where Kayal played 43 games and scoring 2 goals in the league in the 2015–16 season. Brighton were to face another season in the Championship after losing to Sheffield Wednesday on aggregate in the playoffs where Kayal played in both matches for the Albion.

On 7 January 2017 Kayal played in his first FA Cup match, scoring in the 2–0 home win over MK Dons. On 17 April he played in the 2–1 home win over Wigan Athletic which secured automatic promotion to the Premier League.

Kayal broke his leg in pre-season in a friendly match against Atlético Madrid, and was sidelined for 10 weeks. He made his Premier League debut on 13 December 2017 in a 2–0 away defeat to Tottenham Hotspur. Kayal went on to make 18 more Premier League appearances and played in the 1–0 win over Manchester United which secured Albion's Premier League status.

Kayal signed a one-year contract extension on 28 September 2018 that keeps him at the Sussex club until June 2020. He scored his first Premier League goal in a 1–0 away win against Newcastle United on 20 October. He played in all five games for Brighton to the run up to the 2019 FA Cup Semi Final, which included the narrow quarter final penalty shootout win away at Millwall. However, he did not feature in the 1–0 semi final defeat against Manchester City at Wembley. Kayal appeared in the 1–1 home draw against Newcastle claiming a vital point for The Seagulls in their fight for survival. Kayal made 18 league appearances as Brighton retained their Premier League status for a third consecutive season.

==== Charlton Athletic (loan) ====
On 8 August 2019, Kayal signed for Championship side Charlton Athletic on a season-long loan. He made his debut for The Addicks on 14 September in a 1–0 home defeat against Birmingham City. On 15 January 2020, Kayal's loan was cut short due to injury.

==== Brighton departure ====
Kayal was released from The Albion in July 2020 after five and a half years with the club. He made 131 appearances scoring five times in all competitions in a successful time for the Sussex side.

=== Bnei Sakhnin ===
On 17 November 2020, Kayal returned to Israel and signed a three-year contract with Bnei Sakhnin of the Israeli Premier League, who had just been promoted. He made his debut eight days later, starting in a 4–0 away loss against Hapoel Hadera in which he was replaced in the 46th minute, in what was his first appearance in the Israeli top flight in over 11 years. He scored his first goal for the club, scoring the only goal of the game in a 1–0 home victory over Hapoel Be'er Sheva on his 11th appearance, on 30 January 2021.

== International career ==
Throughout his career, Kayal has played many Israel national team matches as first line-up. He represented the national team at the Valeri Lobanovsky Memorial Tournament 2007 that was victorious for it. He made his full international debut for Israel against Switzerland on 6 September 2008.

He scored his first international goal, in a Euro 2012 qualifying win over Latvia on 26 March 2011.

== Style of play ==
Kayal is a central midfielder but he is capable of performing various different roles within the position. He can play as a defensive midfielder, sitting in front of the back four and stifling the opposition or as a box-to-box midfielder, protecting the defenders as well as supporting the forwards. Although he is more renowned for his defensive capabilities than attacking, he is still able to contribute well to going forward.

Kayal is a midfielder known for high stamina level, tackling, passing ability, and quick feet. Former Manchester City and Israeli former international footballer Eyal Berkovic, described him as being: "Perfect for British football. He is strong technically, very aware but really competitive... He will have no problem adapting to the style in Scotland – he will love the speed and aggression.

== Career statistics ==
=== Club ===
As of 1 June 2022

Appearances and goals by club, season and competition
Club	Season	League			National cup		League cup		Europe		Other		Total	
Club	Season	Division	Apps	Goals	Apps	Goals	Apps	Goals	Apps	Goals	Apps	Goals	Apps	Goals
Maccabi Haifa	2005–06	Israeli Premier League	2	0	0	0	0	0	—		—		2	0
Maccabi Haifa	2006–07	Israeli Premier League	4	0	2	0	0	0	—		—		6	0
Maccabi Haifa	2007–08	Israeli Premier League	29	1	3	0	2	0	2 (Note: Appearances in UEFA Europa League)	0	—		36	1
Maccabi Haifa	2008–09	Israeli Premier League	30	4	4	1	5	1	—		—		39	6
Maccabi Haifa	2009–10	Israeli Premier League	27	1	4	0	1	0	10 (Note: Appearances in UEFA Champions League)	0	—		42	1
Maccabi Haifa	Total		92	6	13	1	8	1	12	0	0	0	125	8
Celtic	2010–11	Scottish Premier League	21	2	5	0	2	0	2	0	—		30	2
Celtic	2011–12	Scottish Premier League	19	0	0	0	2	0	7	0	—		28	0
Celtic	2012–13	Scottish Premier League	27	0	5	0	1	0	8	0	—		41	0
Celtic	2013–14	Scottish Premiership	13	0	0	0	0	0	7	1	—		20	1
Celtic	2014–15	Scottish Premiership	6	0	0	0	0	0	7 (Note: Four appearances in UEFA Champions League, three appearances in UEFA Europa League)	0	—		13	0
Celtic	Total		86	2	10	0	5	0	31	1	0	0	132	3
Brighton & Hove Albion	2014–15	Championship	18	1	0	0	—		—		—		18	1
Brighton & Hove Albion	2015–16	Championship	43	2	0	0	0	0	—		2 (Note: Appearances in Championship play-offs)	0	45	2
Brighton & Hove Albion	2016–17	Championship	20	0	1	1	0	0	—		—		21	1
Brighton & Hove Albion	2017–18	Premier League	19	0	4	0	0	0	—		—		23	0
Brighton & Hove Albion	2018–19	Premier League	18	1	5	0	1	0	—		—		24	1
Brighton & Hove Albion	2019–20	Premier League	0	0	0	0	0	0	—		—		0	0
Brighton & Hove Albion	Total		118	4	10	1	1	0	0	0	2	0	131	5
Charlton Athletic (loan)	2019–20	Championship	6	0	0	0	0	0	—		—		6	0
Bnei Sakhnin	2020–21	Israeli Premier League	20	3	2	0	0	0	—		—		22	3
Bnei Sakhnin	2021–22	Israeli Premier League	31	5	2	0	5	0	—		—		38	5
Bnei Sakhnin	Total		51	8	4	0	5	0	0	0	0	0	60	8
Career total			353	20	37	2	19	1	43	1	2	0	454	24

=== International ===
Scores and results list Israel's goal tally first, score column indicates score after each Kayal goal.

List of international goals scored by Beram Kayal
No.	Date	Venue	Opponent	Score	Result	Competition
1	26 March 2011	Bloomfield Stadium, Tel Aviv, Israel	Latvia	2–1	2–1	UEFA Euro 2012 qualification
2	21 November 2018	Hampden Park, Glasgow, Scotland	Scotland	1–0	2–3	2018–19 UEFA Nations League C

== Honours ==
Maccabi Haifa

- Israeli Premier League: 2005–06, 2008–09
- Toto Cup Al: 2007–08

Celtic

- Scottish Premiership: 2011–12, 2012–13, 2013–14, 2014–15
- Scottish Cup: 2010–11, 2012–13

Brighton & Hove Albion

- EFL Championship runner-up: 2016–17

Individual

- Israel U19 League Outstanding Player Award: (2004–05)
- Israel U19 Most Valuable Player: (2006–07)
- SPL Player of The Month: January 2011
- SPFA SPL Team of the Year: 2010–11
