= 2017–18 Brighton & Hove Albion F.C. season =

116th season in existence of Brighton & Hove Albion

Brighton & Hove Albion
2017–18 season
- Chairman: Tony Bloom
- Manager: Chris Hughton
- Stadium: Falmer Stadium
- Premier League: 15th
- FA Cup: Quarter-finals
- EFL Cup: Third round
- Top goalscorer: League: Glenn Murray (12); All: Glenn Murray (14)
- Highest home attendance: 30,600 vs Chelsea (20 January 2018)
Home colours	Away colours	Third colours

The 2017–18 season was Brighton & Hove Albion's 116th year in existence and first season in the Premier League. Along with competing in the Premier League, the club also participated in the FA Cup and EFL Cup.

The season covered the period from 1 July 2017 to 30 June 2018.

Brighton secured their Premier League status for another season on 4 May 2018 by defeating Manchester United 1–0 at home.

== Players ==
=== Current squad ===
As of 30 January 2018

Note: Flags indicate national team as defined under FIFA eligibility rules; some limited exceptions apply. Players may hold more than one non-FIFA nationality.

No.	Pos.	Nation	Player
1	GK	AUS	Mathew Ryan
2	DF	ESP	Bruno (captain)
3	DF	CMR	Gaëtan Bong
4	DF	GER	Uwe Hünemeier
5	DF	ENG	Lewis Dunk (vice-captain)
6	MF	ENG	Dale Stephens
7	MF	ISR	Beram Kayal
8	MF	CZE	Jiří Skalák
9	FW	ENG	Sam Baldock
10	FW	ISR	Tomer Hemed
11	MF	FRA	Anthony Knockaert
12	GK	FIN	Niki Mäenpää
13	MF	GER	Pascal Groß

No.	Pos.	Nation	Player
14	MF	ENG	Steve Sidwell
16	FW	ARG	Leonardo Ulloa (on loan from Leicester City)
17	FW	ENG	Glenn Murray
18	DF	ENG	Connor Goldson
19	MF	COL	José Izquierdo
20	MF	ENG	Solly March
21	DF	ITA	Ezequiel Schelotto
22	DF	IRL	Shane Duffy
23	DF	ENG	Liam Rosenior
24	MF	NED	Davy Pröpper
25	FW	NED	Jürgen Locadia
26	GK	NED	Tim Krul
29	DF	AUT	Markus Suttner

=== Out on loan ===
Note: Flags indicate national team as defined under FIFA eligibility rules; some limited exceptions apply. Players may hold more than one non-FIFA nationality.

No.	Pos.	Nation	Player
15	MF	SCO	Jamie Murphy (at Rangers until 31 May 2018) (Note: Murphy loan move to be made permanent on expiry)
31	GK	ENG	Christian Walton (at Wigan Athletic until 31 May 2018)
34	MF	ENG	Rohan Ince (at Bury until 31 May 2018)

No.	Pos.	Nation	Player
36	MF	IRL	Richie Towell (at Rotherham United until 31 May 2018)
—	MF	NIR	Oliver Norwood (at Fulham until 31 May 2018)
—	MF	NED	Soufyan Ahannach (at Sparta Rotterdam until 30 June 2018)

== Transfers ==
=== Transfers in ===
Date from	Position	Nationality	Name	From	Fee	Ref.
1 July 2017	CM	(Germany)	Pascal Groß	FC Ingolstadt	Undisclosed	
1 July 2017	RB	(Scotland)	Josh Kerr	Celtic	Undisclosed	
1 July 2017	GK	(Australia)	Mathew Ryan	Valencia	Undisclosed	
13 July 2017	LB	(Austria)	Markus Suttner	FC Ingolstadt	Undisclosed	
20 July 2017	CM	(Norway)	Mathias Normann	Bodø/Glimt	Undisclosed	
31 July 2017	CF	(England)	Steven Alzate	Leyton Orient	Undisclosed	
4 August 2017	RB	(Czech Republic)	Aleš Matějů	Viktoria Plzeň	Undisclosed	
7 August 2017	CM	(Netherlands)	Davy Pröpper	PSV	Undisclosed	
10 August 2017	LW	(Netherlands)	Soufyan Ahannach	Almere City	Undisclosed	
20 August 2017	LW	(Colombia)	José Izquierdo	Club Brugge	Undisclosed	
31 August 2017	RB	(Italy)	Ezequiel Schelotto	Sporting CP	Undisclosed	
20 September 2017	GK	(Netherlands)	Tim Krul	Newcastle United	Free	
1 January 2018	CF	(Sweden)	Viktor Gyökeres	IF Brommapojkarna	Undisclosed	
12 January 2018	CB	(Republic of Ireland)	Warren O'Hora	Bohemian	Undisclosed	
19 January 2018	ST / LW	(Netherlands)	Jürgen Locadia	PSV	Undisclosed	

=== Loans in ===
Start date	Position	Nationality	Name	From	End date	Ref.
25 July 2017	CF	(England)	Izzy Brown	Chelsea	10 January 2018	(Note: On 10 January 2018, Brown returned to parent club Chelsea after suffering an anterior cruciate ligament injury.)
31 August 2017	GK	(Netherlands)	Tim Krul	Newcastle United	20 September 2017	(Note: On 20 September 2017, Tim Krul's loan move from Newcastle United was turned into a permanent one-year deal.)
29 January 2018	ST	(Argentina)	Leonardo Ulloa	Leicester City	30 June 2018	

=== Transfers out ===
Date from	Position	Nationality	Name	To	Fee	Ref.
1 July 2017	CB	(Norway)	Vegard Forren	(Norway) Molde	Released	(Note: Vegard Forren joined Molde following his release.)
1 July 2017	CF	(England)	Chris O'Grady	(England) Chesterfield	Released	(Note: Chris O'Grady joined Chesterfield following his release.)
1 July 2017	GK	(England)	David Stockdale	(England) Birmingham City	Free	
1 July 2017	RW	(England)	Joe Ward	(England) Woking	Free	
10 July 2017	LW	(Netherlands)	Elvis Manu	(Turkey) Gençlerbirliği	Free	
13 July 2017	RB	(England)	Rob Hunt	(England) Oldham Athletic	Undisclosed	
6 January 2018	LM	(Scotland)	Jamie Murphy	(Scotland) Rangers	Undisclosed	(Note: Murphy transfer is an initial loan move, with a guaranteed set fee to become permanent on its expiry.)
25 January 2018	LW	(Democratic Republic of the Congo)	Kazenga LuaLua	(England) Sunderland	Free	

=== Loans out ===
Start date	Position	Nationality	Name	To	End date	Ref.
10 July 2017	ST	(England)	Jordan Maguire-Drew	Lincoln City	January 2018	
12 July 2017	GK	(England)	Christian Walton	Wigan Athletic	30 June 2018	
25 July 2017	CM	(Northern Ireland)	Oliver Norwood	Fulham	30 June 2018	
31 July 2017	CF	(Kenya)	Jonah Ayunga	Galway United	5 November 2017	
1 August 2017	CB	(England)	Ben White	Newport County	30 June 2018	
4 August 2017	CB	(England)	Tom Dallison	Accrington Stanley	January 2018	
4 August 2017	RB	(England)	Tyler Hornby-Forbes	Accrington Stanley	January 2018	
11 August 2017	LW	(Democratic Republic of the Congo)	Kazenga LuaLua	Queens Park Rangers	1 December 2017 (Note: Kazenga LuaLua's loan move was terminated on 1 December 2017, with LuaLua returning to Brighton.)	
15 August 2017	MF	(England)	Archie Davies	Whitehawk	January 2018	
16 August 2017	CM	(Norway)	Mathias Normann	Molde	January 2018	
25 August 2017	DM	(England)	Rohan Ince	Bury	30 June 2018	
31 August 2017	LB	(Republic of Ireland)	Rian O'Sullivan	Worthing	January 2018	
31 August 2017	CM	(Republic of Ireland)	Richie Towell	Rotherham United	30 June 2018	
3 January 2018	ST	(England)	Jordan Maguire-Drew	Coventry City	30 June 2018	
19 January 2018	LW	(Netherlands)	Soufyan Ahannach	Sparta Rotterdam	30 June 2018	

== Contracts ==
=== New contracts ===
Date	Position	Nationality	Name	Duration	Notes	Reference
9 May 2017	CM	(England)	Dale Stephens	June 2021	–	
20 May 2017	CM	(Republic of Ireland)	Richie Towell	June 2019	Towell later completed a season-long loan move to Rotherham United.	
30 May 2017	LB	(Cameroon)	Gaëtan Bong	June 2018	–	
8 June 2017	CM	(England)	Steve Sidwell	June 2018	–	
20 June 2017	ST	(England)	Sam Baldock	June 2020	–	
12 July 2017	GK	(England)	Christian Walton	June 2021	Walton later completed a season-long loan move to Wigan Athletic.	
14 July 2017	GK	(Finland)	Niki Mäenpää	June 2018	–	
17 August 2017	CB	(England)	Lewis Dunk	June 2022	–	
17 August 2017	CB	(Republic of Ireland)	Shane Duffy	June 2021	–	
17 August 2017	RM	(France)	Anthony Knockaert	June 2022	–	
16 November 2017	ST	(Israel)	Tomer Hemed	June 2019	–	

== Pre-season ==
Brighton & Hove Albion announced six pre-season friendlies against Crawley Town, Southend United, Norwich City, Atlético Madrid, Girona and Fortuna Düsseldorf.

14 July 2017	Fortuna Düsseldorf	0–2	Brighton & Hove Albion	Bischofshofen, Austria
18:00 CEST		Report	Murphy 77'; Hemed 79'	Stadium: Sportplatz Bischofshofen

22 July 2017	Crawley Town	0–6	Brighton & Hove Albion	Crawley
15:00 BST		Report	March 4'; Groß 30'; Hemed 38'; Murphy 41'; Goldson 67'; Murray 78' (pen.)	Stadium: Broadfield Stadium

25 July 2017	Southend United	0–3	Brighton & Hove Albion	Southend-on-Sea
19:45 BST		Report	March 34', 41'; Murray 44'	Stadium: Roots Hall

29 July 2017	Norwich City	1–1	Brighton & Hove Albion	Norwich
15:00 BST	Watkins 42'	Report	Groß 21'	Stadium: Carrow Road

1 August 2017	Girona	0–0	Brighton & Hove Albion	Palamós, Spain
20:00 CEST		Report		Stadium: Estadi Palamós Costa Brava

6 August 2017	Brighton & Hove Albion	2–3	Atlético Madrid	Falmer
16:00 BST	Groß 61'; Sidwell 77'	Report	Gaitán 43'; Torres 67'; Hernandez 88'	Stadium: Falmer Stadium

== Competitions ==
=== Premier League ===
==== League table ====
Pos	Team	Pld	W	D	L	GF	GA	GD	Pts	Qualification or relegation
1	Manchester City (C)	38	32	4	2	106	27	+79	100	Qualification for the Champions League group stage
2	Manchester United	38	25	6	7	68	28	+40	81	Qualification for the Champions League group stage
3	Tottenham Hotspur	38	23	8	7	74	36	+38	77	Qualification for the Champions League group stage
4	Liverpool	38	21	12	5	84	38	+46	75	Qualification for the Champions League group stage
5	Chelsea	38	21	7	10	62	38	+24	70	Qualification for the Europa League group stage (Note: Since the winners of the 2017–18 FA Cup (Chelsea) and the winners of the 2017–18 EFL Cup (Manchester City) both qualified for European competition based on their league positions, the berths awarded to the 5th-placed team (Europa League group stage) and the League Cup winners (Europa League second qualifying round) were passed down the league.)
6	Arsenal	38	19	6	13	74	51	+23	63	Qualification for the Europa League group stage
7	Burnley	38	14	12	12	36	39	−3	54	Qualification for the Europa League second qualifying round
8	Everton	38	13	10	15	44	58	−14	49	
9	Leicester City	38	12	11	15	56	60	−4	47	
10	Newcastle United	38	12	8	18	39	47	−8	44	
11	Crystal Palace	38	11	11	16	45	55	−10	44	
12	Bournemouth	38	11	11	16	45	61	−16	44	
13	West Ham United	38	10	12	16	48	68	−20	42	
14	Watford	38	11	8	19	44	64	−20	41	
15	Brighton & Hove Albion	38	9	13	16	34	54	−20	40	
16	Huddersfield Town	38	9	10	19	28	58	−30	37	
17	Southampton	38	7	15	16	37	56	−19	36	
18	Swansea City (R)	38	8	9	21	28	56	−28	33	Relegation to EFL Championship
19	Stoke City (R)	38	7	12	19	35	68	−33	33	Relegation to EFL Championship
20	West Bromwich Albion (R)	38	6	13	19	31	56	−25	31	Relegation to EFL Championship

Source: Premier League
Rules for classification: 1) Points; 2) Goal difference; 3) Goals scored. 4) Play-offs (only if needed to decide champion, teams for relegation or teams for UEFA competitions).
(C) Champions; (R) Relegated

==== Results summary ====
Overall								Home						Away					
Pld	W	D	L	GF	GA	GD	Pts	W	D	L	GF	GA	GD	W	D	L	GF	GA	GD
38	9	13	16	34	54	−20	40	7	8	4	24	25	−1	2	5	12	10	29	−19

Last updated: 13 May 2018.
Source: Premier League

==== Results by round ====
Rounds	1	2	3	4	5	6	7	8	9	10	11	12	13	14	15	16	17	18	19	20	21	22	23	24	25	26	27	28	29	30	31	32	33	34	35	36	37	38
Ground	H	A	A	H	A	H	A	H	A	H	A	H	A	H	H	A	A	H	H	A	A	H	A	H	A	H	A	H	H	A	H	H	A	H	A	H	A	A
Result	L	L	D	W	L	W	L	D	W	D	W	D	L	D	L	L	L	D	W	L	D	D	L	L	D	W	D	W	W	L	L	D	L	D	D	W	L	L
Position	17	18	17	14	16	13	14	14	12	12	8	9	9	10	12	13	13	13	12	12	12	12	15	16	15	13	14	12	10	11	13	13	13	13	14	11	14	15

Updated to match(es) played on 13 May 2018. Source: 11v11.com
A = Away; H = Home; W = Win; D = Draw; L = Loss

==== Matches ====
On 14 June 2017, Brighton & Hove Albion's fixtures were announced.

12 August 2017 1	Brighton & Hove Albion	0–2	Manchester City	Falmer
17:30 BST		Report	Agüero 70'; Dunk 75' (o.g.)	Stadium: Falmer Stadium; Attendance: 30,415; Referee: Michael Oliver

19 August 2017 2	Leicester City	2–0	Brighton & Hove Albion	Leicester
15:00 BST	Okazaki 1'; Maguire 54'	Report		Stadium: King Power Stadium; Attendance: 31,902; Referee: Lee Probert

26 August 2017 3	Watford	0–0	Brighton & Hove Albion	Watford
15:00 BST	Britos (red card) 24'	Report		Stadium: Vicarage Road Stadium; Attendance: 20,181; Referee: Graham Scott

9 September 2017 4	Brighton & Hove Albion	3–1	West Bromwich Albion	Falmer
15:00 BST	Groß 45', 48'; Hemed 63'	Report	Morrison 77'	Stadium: Falmer Stadium; Attendance: 30,381; Referee: Chris Kavanagh

15 September 2017 5	AFC Bournemouth	2–1	Brighton & Hove Albion	Boscombe
20:00 BST	Surman 67'; Defoe 73'	Report	March 55'	Stadium: Dean Court; Referee: Craig Pawson

24 September 2017 6	Brighton & Hove Albion	1–0	Newcastle United	Falmer
16:00 BST	Hemed 51'	Report		Stadium: Falmer Stadium; Attendance: 30,468; Referee: Andre Marriner

1 October 2017 7	Arsenal	2–0	Brighton & Hove Albion	Holloway, London
12:00 BST	Monreal 16'; Iwobi 56'	Report		Stadium: Emirates Stadium; Attendance: 59,378; Referee: Kevin Friend

15 October 2017 8	Brighton & Hove Albion	1–1	Everton	Falmer
13:30 BST	Knockaert 82'	Report	Rooney 90' (pen.)	Stadium: Falmer Stadium; Attendance: 30,565; Referee: Michael Oliver

20 October 2017 9	West Ham United	0–3	Brighton & Hove Albion	Stratford
20:00 BST		Report	Murray 10', 75' (pen.); Izquierdo 45+1'	Stadium: London Stadium; Attendance: 56,977; Referee: Martin Atkinson

29 October 2017 10	Brighton & Hove Albion	1–1	Southampton	Falmer
13:30 GMT	Murray 52'	Report	Davis 7'	Stadium: Falmer Stadium; Attendance: 30,564; Referee: Neil Swarbrick

4 November 2017 11	Swansea City	0–1	Brighton & Hove Albion	Swansea
15:00 GMT		Report	Murray 29'	Stadium: Liberty Stadium; Attendance: 20,822; Referee: Mike Dean

20 November 2017 12	Brighton & Hove Albion	2–2	Stoke City	Falmer
20:00 GMT	Groß 44'; Izquierdo 60'	Report	Choupo-Moting 28'; Zouma 45+1'	Stadium: Falmer Stadium; Attendance: 29,676; Referee: Lee Mason

25 November 2017 13	Manchester United	1–0	Brighton & Hove Albion	Trafford
15:00 GMT	Dunk 66' (o.g.)	Report		Stadium: Old Trafford; Attendance: 75,018; Referee: Neil Swarbrick

28 November 2017 14	Brighton & Hove Albion	0–0	Crystal Palace	Falmer
19:45 GMT		Report		Stadium: Falmer Stadium; Attendance: 29,889; Referee: Andre Marriner

2 December 2017 15	Brighton & Hove Albion	1–5	Liverpool	Falmer
15:00 GMT	Murray 51' (pen.)	Report	Can 30'; Firmino 31', 48'; Coutinho 87'; Dunk 89' (o.g.)	Stadium: Falmer Stadium; Attendance: 30,515; Referee: Andre Marriner

9 December 2017 16	Huddersfield Town	2–0	Brighton & Hove Albion	Huddersfield
15:00 GMT	Mounié 12', 43'	Report		Stadium: Kirklees Stadium; Attendance: 24,018; Referee: Stuart Attwell

13 December 2017 17	Tottenham Hotspur	2–0	Brighton & Hove Albion	Wembley
20:00 GMT	Aurier 40'; Son 87'	Report		Stadium: Wembley Stadium; Referee: Graham Scott

16 December 2017 18	Brighton & Hove Albion	0–0	Burnley	Falmer
15:00 GMT	Murray (penalty missed) 36'	Report		Stadium: Falmer Stadium; Attendance: 29,921; Referee: Chris Kavanagh

23 December 2017 19	Brighton & Hove Albion	1–0	Watford	Falmer
15:00 GMT	Groß 64'	Report		Stadium: Falmer Stadium; Attendance: 30,473; Referee: Paul Tierney

26 December 2017 20	Chelsea	2–0	Brighton & Hove Albion	Fulham
15:00 GMT	Morata 46'; Alonso 60'	Report		Stadium: Stamford Bridge; Attendance: 41,568; Referee: Mike Dean

30 December 2017 21	Newcastle United	0–0	Brighton & Hove Albion	Newcastle upon Tyne
15:00 GMT		Report		Stadium: St James' Park; Attendance: 52,209; Referee: Anthony Taylor

1 January 2018 22	Brighton & Hove Albion	2–2	AFC Bournemouth	Falmer
12:30 GMT	Knockaert 5'; Murray 48'	Report	Cook 33'; Wilson 79'	Stadium: Falmer Stadium; Attendance: 30,152; Referee: Michael Oliver

13 January 2018 23	West Bromwich Albion	2–0	Brighton & Hove Albion	West Bromwich
15:00 GMT	Evans 4'; Dawson 55'	Report		Stadium: The Hawthorns; Attendance: 25,240; Referee: Martin Atkinson

20 January 2018 24	Brighton & Hove Albion	0–4	Chelsea	Falmer
12:30 GMT		Report	Hazard 3', 77'; Willian 6'; Moses 89'	Stadium: Falmer Stadium; Attendance: 30,600; Referee: Jonathan Moss

31 January 2018 25	Southampton	1–1	Brighton & Hove Albion	Southampton
19:45 GMT	Stephens 64'	Report	Murray 14' (pen.)	Stadium: St Mary's Stadium; Attendance: 30,034; Referee: Mike Dean

3 February 2018 26	Brighton & Hove Albion	3–1	West Ham United	Falmer
15:00 GMT	Murray 8'; Izquierdo 59'; Groß 75'	Report	Hernández 30'	Stadium: Falmer Stadium; Attendance: 30,589; Referee: Roger East

10 February 2018 27	Stoke City	1–1	Brighton & Hove Albion	Stoke-on-Trent
15:00 GMT	Shaqiri 68'; Adam (penalty missed) 90'	Report	Izquierdo 32'	Stadium: Britannia Stadium; Attendance: 29,876; Referee: Bobby Madley

24 February 2018 28	Brighton & Hove Albion	4–1	Swansea City	Falmer
15:00 GMT	Murray 18' (pen.), 69'; Knockaert 73'; Locadia 90'	Report	Dunk 85' (o.g.)	Stadium: Falmer Stadium; Attendance: 30,523; Referee: Mike Dean

4 March 2018 29	Brighton & Hove Albion	2–1	Arsenal	Falmer
13:30 GMT	Dunk 7'; Murray 26'	Report	Aubameyang 43'	Stadium: Falmer Stadium; Attendance: 30,620; Referee: Stuart Attwell

10 March 2018 30	Everton	2–0	Brighton & Hove Albion	Liverpool
15:00 GMT	Bong 60' (o.g.); Tosun 76'	Report	Knockaert (red card) 80'	Stadium: Goodison Park; Attendance: 39,199; Referee: Roger East

31 March 2018 31	Brighton & Hove Albion	0–2	Leicester City	Falmer
15:00 BST	Kayal (yellow card) 66'; Murray (penalty missed) 77'; Bong (yellow card) 79'	Report	Morgan (yellow card) 12'; Ndidi (yellow card) 24' (yellow-red card) 87'; Chilwell (yellow card) 63'; Simpson (yellow card) 64'; Maguire (yellow card) 68'; Iborra 83'; Vardy 90+6'	Stadium: Falmer Stadium; Attendance: 30,629; Referee: Chris Kavanagh

7 April 2018 32	Brighton & Hove Albion	1–1	Huddersfield Town	Falmer
15:00 BST	Lössl 29' (o.g.); Duffy (yellow card) 58'; Pröpper (red card) 74'	Report	Mounié 32'	Stadium: Falmer Stadium; Attendance: 30,501; Referee: Anthony Taylor

14 April 2018 33	Crystal Palace	3–2	Brighton & Hove Albion	Selhurst
15:00 BST	Zaha 5', 24', (yellow card) 79'; Tomkins 14'; Milivojević (yellow card) 16'; Hennessey (yellow card) 89'	Report	Stephens (yellow card) 11'; Murray 18'; Izquierdo 34'; Kayal (yellow card) 90'	Stadium: Selhurst Park; Attendance: 24,656; Referee: Andre Marriner

17 April 2018 34	Brighton & Hove Albion	1–1	Tottenham Hotspur	Falmer
19:45 BST	Dunk (yellow card) 11'; Groß 50'	Report	Kane 48'	Stadium: Falmer Stadium; Attendance: 30,440; Referee: Kevin Friend

28 April 2018 35	Burnley	0–0	Brighton & Hove Albion	Burnley
15:00 BST		Report	Stephens (yellow card) 41'; Murray (yellow card) 72'	Stadium: Turf Moor; Attendance: 19,459; Referee: Roger East

4 May 2018 36	Brighton & Hove Albion	1–0	Manchester United	Falmer
20:00 BST	Murray (yellow card) 47'; Groß 57', (yellow card) 67'			Stadium: Falmer Stadium; Attendance: 30,611; Referee: Craig Pawson

9 May 2018 37	Manchester City	3–1	Brighton & Hove Albion	Manchester
20:00 BST	Danilo 16'; B. Silva 34'; Fernandinho 72'	Report	Ulloa 20'; Duffy (yellow card) 37'	Stadium: City of Manchester Stadium; Attendance: 54,013; Referee: Paul Tierney

13 May 2018 38	Liverpool	4–0	Brighton & Hove Albion	Liverpool
15:00 BST	Salah 26'; Lovren 40'; Solanke 53'; Robertson 85'	Report		Stadium: Anfield; Attendance: 50,752; Referee: Kevin Friend

=== FA Cup ===
In the FA Cup, Albion entered the competition in the third round and were drawn at home to Crystal Palace.

8 January 2018 Third round	Brighton & Hove Albion	2–1	Crystal Palace	Falmer
19:45 GMT	Stephens 25'; Murray 87'	Report	Sako 69'	Stadium: Falmer Stadium; Attendance: 14,507; Referee: Andre Marriner

27 January 2018 Fourth round	Middlesbrough	0–1	Brighton & Hove Albion	Middlesbrough
15:00 GMT		Report	Murray 90'	Stadium: Riverside Stadium; Attendance: 20,475; Referee: Anthony Taylor

17 February 2018 Fifth round	Brighton & Hove Albion	3–1	Coventry City	Falmer
15:00 GMT	Locadia 15'; Goldson 34'; Ulloa 61'	Report	Clarke-Harris 77'	Stadium: Falmer Stadium; Attendance: 26,966; Referee: Craig Pawson

17 March 2018 Quarter-finals	Manchester United	2–0	Brighton & Hove Albion	Greater Manchester
19:45 GMT	Lukaku 37'; Matić 83'	Report		Stadium: Old Trafford; Attendance: 74,241; Referee: Andre Marriner

=== EFL Cup ===
Brighton & Hove Albion entered the competition in the second round and were drawn at home to Barnet. An away trip in round three against AFC Bournemouth was announced.

22 August 2017 Second round	Brighton & Hove Albion	1–0	Barnet	Falmer
19:45 BST	Tilley 53'	Report		Stadium: Falmer Stadium; Attendance: 11,414; Referee: Steve Martin

19 September 2017 Third round	AFC Bournemouth	1–0 (a.e.t.)	Brighton & Hove Albion	Boscombe
19:45 BST	King 99'	Report		Stadium: Dean Court; Attendance: 10,372; Referee: Kevin Friend

== Squad statistics ==
No.	Pos	Nat	Player	Total		Premier League		EFL Cup		FA Cup	
No.	Pos	Nat	Player	Apps	Goals	Apps	Goals	Apps	Goals	Apps	Goals
Goalkeepers
1	GK	(Australia) AUS	Mathew Ryan	38	0	38	0	0	0	0	0
12	GK	(Finland) FIN	Niki Mäenpää	2	0	0	0	1	0	0+1	0
26	GK	(Netherlands) NED	Tim Krul	5	0	0	0	1	0	4	0
Defenders
2	DF	(Spain) ESP	Bruno	26	0	23+2	0	1	0	0	0
3	DF	(Cameroon) CMR	Gaëtan Bong	28	0	25	0	1	0	2	0
4	DF	(Germany) GER	Uwe Hünemeier	6	0	0+1	0	3	0	2	0
5	DF	(England) ENG	Lewis Dunk	39	1	38	1	1	0	0	0
18	DF	(England) ENG	Connor Goldson	8	1	2+1	0	2	0	3	1
21	DF	(Italy) ITA	Ezequiel Schelotto	23	0	15+5	0	2	0	1	0
22	DF	(Republic of Ireland) IRL	Shane Duffy	38	0	37	0	1	0	0	0
23	DF	(England) ENG	Liam Rosenior	6	0	1+2	0	1	0	2	0
29	DF	(Austria) AUT	Markus Suttner	17	0	13+1	0	3	0	0	0
38	DF	(Czech Republic) CZE	Aleš Matějů	2	0	0	0	0	0	0+2	0
Midfielders
6	MF	(England) ENG	Dale Stephens	39	1	36	0	3	1	0	0
7	MF	(Israel) ISR	Beram Kayal	23	0	8+11	0	4	0	0	0
8	MF	(Czech Republic) CZE	Jiří Skalák	3	0	0	0	1	0	2	0
11	MF	(France) FRA	Anthony Knockaert	36	3	27+6	3	1	0	1+1	0
13	MF	(Germany) GER	Pascal Groß	39	7	35+3	7	1	0	0	0
20	MF	(England) ENG	Solly March	40	1	18+18	1	3	0	0+1	0
24	MF	(Netherlands) NED	Davy Pröpper	40	0	35	0	1+3	0	0+1	0
47	MF	(Republic of Ireland) IRL	Dessie Hutchinson	1	0	0	0	0	0	1	0
49	MF	(Republic of Ireland) IRL	Jayson Molumby	2	0	0	0	0	0	2	0
Forwards
9	FW	(England) ENG	Sam Baldock	5	0	0+2	0	1+2	0	0	0
10	FW	(Israel) ISR	Tomer Hemed	19	2	9+7	2	2	0	1	0
16	FW	(Argentina) ARG	Leonardo Ulloa	12	2	2+8	1	2	1	0	0
17	FW	(England) ENG	Glenn Murray	38	14	25+10	12	1+2	2	0	0
19	FW	(Colombia) COL	José Izquierdo	36	5	23+9	5	1+2	0	1	0
25	FW	(Netherlands) NED	Jürgen Locadia	8	2	3+3	1	2	1	0	0
66	FW	(Republic of Ireland) IRL	Aaron Connolly	1	0	0	0	0	0	0+1	0
70	FW	(England) ENG	James Tilley	1	1	0	0	0	0	0+1	1
Players who have made an appearance or had a squad number this season but have left the club
15	FW	(Scotland) SCO	Jamie Murphy	5	0	1+3	0	0	0	1	0
37	FW	(England) ENG	Izzy Brown	13	0	4+8	0	1	0	0	0

=== Goalscorers ===
Includes all competitive matches.

As of match played 4 March 2018

Rank	Pos.	No.	Player	Premier League	FA Cup	EFL Cup	Total
1	FW	17	(England) Glenn Murray	12	2	0	14
2	MF	13	(Germany) Pascal Groß	7	0	0	7
3	FW	19	(Colombia) José Izquierdo	5	0	0	5
4	MF	11	(France) Anthony Knockaert	3	0	0	3
5	FW	10	(Israel) Tomer Hemed	2	0	0	2
5	FW	16	(Argentina) Leonardo Ulloa	1	1	0	2
5	FW	25	(Netherlands) Jürgen Locadia	1	1	0	2
8	DF	5	(England) Lewis Dunk	1	0	0	1
8	MF	6	(England) Dale Stephens	0	1	0	1
8	DF	18	(England) Connor Goldson	0	1	0	1
8	MF	20	(England) Solly March	1	0	0	1
8	FW	70	(England) James Tilley	0	0	1	1
Total				28	6	1	35

=== Clean sheets ===
Includes all competitive matches. The list is sorted alphabetically by surname when total clean sheets are equal.

Correct as of matches played on 24 February 2018

No.	Player	Premier League	FA Cup	EFL Cup	Total
1	(Australia) Mathew Ryan	8	0	0	8
12	(Finland) Niki Mäenpää	0	0	1	1
26	(Netherlands) Tim Krul	0	1	0	1

=== Disciplinary record ===
As of matches played 30 December 2017

No.	Pos.	Name	Premier League		FA Cup		EFL Cup		Total	
No.	Pos.	Name	Booked	Sent off (straight red)	Booked	Sent off (straight red)	Booked	Sent off (straight red)	Booked	Sent off (straight red)
2	DF	(Spain) Bruno	3	0	0	0	0	0	3	0
3	DF	(Cameroon) Gaëtan Bong	1	0	0	0	0	0	1	0
5	DF	(England) Lewis Dunk	5	0	0	0	0	0	5	0
6	MF	(England) Dale Stephens	2	0	0	0	0	0	2	0
8	MF	(Czech Republic) Jiří Skalák	0	0	0	0	1	0	1	0
11	MF	(France) Anthony Knockaert	4	0	0	0	1	0	5	0
13	MF	(Germany) Pascal Groß	1	0	0	0	0	0	1	0
17	FW	(England) Glenn Murray	4	0	0	0	0	0	4	0
19	FW	(Colombia) José Izquierdo	1	0	0	0	0	0	1	0
20	MF	(England) Solly March	2	0	0	0	0	0	2	0
22	DF	(Republic of Ireland) Shane Duffy	5	0	0	0	0	0	5	0
24	MF	(Netherlands) Davy Pröpper	1	1	0	0	0	0	1	1
Total			29	0	0	0	1	0	30	0
