= Jamie Murphy (footballer, born 1989) =

Scottish footballer

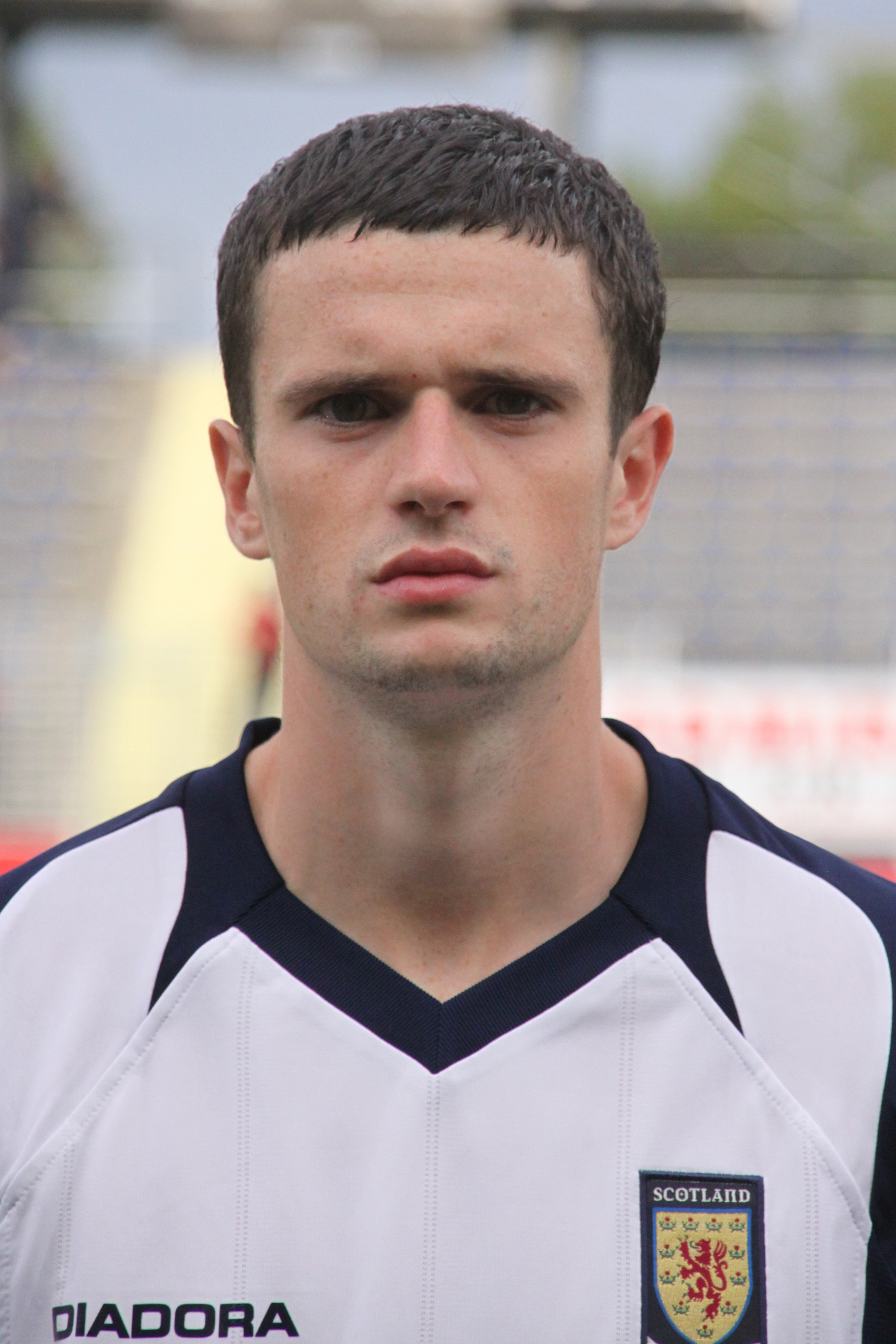
- Murphy representing Scotland U21 in 2009

Personal information
- Full name: James Murphy
- Date of birth: 28 August 1989 (age 37)
- Place of birth: Glasgow, Scotland
- Height: 5 ft 10 in (1.78 m)
- Position: Winger

Team information
- Current team: Ayr United
- Number: 15

Youth career
- –2002: Clyde
- 2002–2006: Motherwell

Senior career*
Years	Team	Apps	(Gls)
2006–2013	Motherwell	176	(34)
2013–2015	Sheffield United	95	(17)
2015–2018	Brighton & Hove Albion	76	(8)
2018	→ Rangers (loan)	16	(4)
2018–2021	Rangers	4	(0)
2020	→ Burton Albion (loan)	10	(7)
2020–2021	→ Hibernian (loan)	19	(1)
2021–2022	Hibernian	18	(2)
2022	→ Mansfield Town (loan)	14	(1)
2022–2023	St. Johnstone	24	(3)
2023–	Ayr United	81	(16)

International career^{‡}
2007	Scotland U19	4	(0)
2008–2010	Scotland U21	13	(4)
2018	Scotland	2	(0)
- * Club domestic league appearances and goals as of 4 May 2026 ‡ National team caps and goals as of 29 May 2018

James Murphy (born 28 August 1989) is a Scottish professional footballer who plays as a winger for Scottish Championship club Ayr United, where he is also first team coach.

Born in Glasgow, Murphy has previously played for Scottish clubs Motherwell, Rangers, Hibernian and St Johnstone, and English clubs Sheffield United, Brighton & Hove Albion, Burton Albion and Mansfield Town. He played for the Scotland U19 and Scotland U21 representative teams, and made his full international debut for Scotland in March 2018.

== Club career ==
=== Motherwell ===
Murphy played as a junior for Westwood Rovers, Drumchapel Thistle and Clyde before joining Motherwell's under-13 team. After progressing through the ranks at Motherwell, Murphy made his first-team début during the 2006–07 season, and scored his first Motherwell goal from the penalty spot in a 2–0 away win over Hibernian in May 2008.

With Motherwell having qualified for European competition, in July 2008 Murphy scored a hat-trick against Albanian side Flamurtari in the UEFA Europa League. After remaining a regular in Motherwell's first team, Murphy agreed an extended contract in May 2010 tying him to the club until the summer of 2013. After scoring in the first leg of Motherwell's 2010–11 Europa League third-round match against Aalesunds FK on 29 July 2010, he became Motherwell's leading goalscorer in European football, breaking the record previously held by Steve Kirk.

In January 2012, Motherwell accepted an offer from Sheffield Wednesday to sign Murphy, but he rejected the proposed transfer. In late December 2012, Sheffield United showed an interest in signing him, and Murphy was subsequently subject to a £100,000 bid from the Blades. However, by 27 December it was reported that the Blades bid had been rejected by Motherwell with Murphy dismissing transfer speculation. Despite this, a few days later Motherwell boss Stuart McCall confirmed that Murphy has been talking to Sheffield United with a view to a transfer, and that Motherwell had accepted a bid of £106,000 which could rise to £250,000 based upon promotion to the Championship and then to the Premier League. Murphy played his last game for Motherwell on 2 January 2013, having been made captain for the occasion, in a 1–0 loss to Celtic at Celtic Park. He departed from Fir Park having scored 50 goals in 215 appearances for Motherwell. Shortly after his departure Murphy was awarded the Clydesdale Bank Premier League Player of the Month award for December.

=== Sheffield United ===
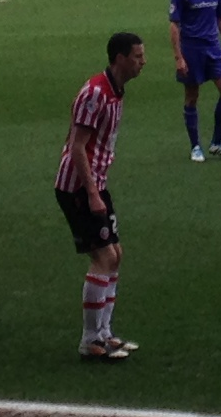
Murphy playing for Sheffield United.

Despite interest from Huddersfield Town and Rangers, Murphy's move to Sheffield United was finalised on 3 January 2013, when he signed a three-and-a-half-year contract for an undisclosed fee. Murphy made his Blades debut two days later, in a 3–0 third round FA Cup victory against Oxford United at the Kassam Stadium, Before making his league debut for United against Yeovil Town at Bramall Lane a week later, and Murphy's first goal for the Blades came in a 2–0 away victory against Bury the following February. Murphy's first few months with United were hampered by a hamstring injury, and finished the season having played 21 games and scoring two goals.

Despite making 21 appearances for the Blades between January and May 2013 Murphy hadn't yet reached the heights he was capable of. He pledged to fulfill his potential the following season. Despite these claims, Murphy played regularly for David Weir but still didn't perform to his potential. He initially fared no better when Weir was quickly replaced by Nigel Clough, remaining a peripheral figure. It was not until January 2014 that Murphy's form improved and he began to consolidate a first team place, citing his improved fitness as the key to his change in fortunes. On 31 January 2015, Murphy signed a new contract with United keeping him at Bramall Lane until summer 2017. Later that day, Murphy came off the bench in the second half and scored a brace against promotion rivals Swindon Town to give United a 2–0 home victory.

=== Brighton & Hove Albion ===
In August 2015, Murphy signed a four-year contract with Brighton & Hove Albion for an undisclosed fee reported to be £1.8m rising to £2m based upon Brighton's promotion to the Premier League, which they did in 2016–1017. He made his Brighton debut on 18 August, in a 1–1 draw with Huddersfield Town. Murphy scored his first goal for Brighton on 26 September, in a 2–2 draw with Bolton Wanderers that also saw him receive a red card in the second half of the game. Murphy made 35 appearances for Brighton in the 2015–16 season, scoring six goals, as the Seagulls narrowly missed out on promotion to the Premier League by finishing in 3rd place on goal difference.

On 9 August 2016, Murphy scored a brace in a 4–0 win against Colchester United in the first round of the EFL Cup. Throughout the 2016–17 season, Murphy scored two goals in 37 league appearances as Brighton gained promotion to the Premier League.

Murphy had limited playing time with Brighton in the Premier League, making four league appearances for the club in the first half of the 2017–18 season, all as a substitute.

=== Rangers ===
On 6 January 2018, Brighton announced that Murphy had joined Scottish Premiership club Rangers on loan until the end of the 2017–18 season. The clubs also agreed a fee for Murphy to move permanently in the summer. Murphy made his competitive debut for Rangers on 24 January 2018 in a 2–0 win against Aberdeen. He was one of four players to make their first appearance for Rangers in that game. Murphy scored his first goal for Rangers in a 6–1 win at Ayr United in the 2017–18 Scottish Cup.

In May 2018, Murphy was signed permanently by Rangers, agreeing a three-year deal. He suffered an anterior cruciate ligament injury in August 2018 whilst playing an away fixture on the artificial turf at Kilmarnock, which ruled him for most of the 2018–19 season.

Murphy agreed a six-month loan deal with League One club Burton Albion on 20 January 2020.

=== Hibernian ===
On 29 August 2020, Murphy signed for fellow Scottish side Hibernian on an initial one-year loan, with an obligation of a further year on a permanent basis.

On 29 July 2021, Murphy scored his first goal for Hibernian in Europe against FC Santa Coloma in a 2–1 away win in the UEFA Conference League qualifiers.

On 31 January 2022, Murphy joined Mansfield Town, on loan for the remainder of the season. Murphy was released by Hibs in June 2022, at the end of his contract.

=== St Johnstone ===
Murphy signed a one-year contract with St Johnstone in July 2022.

=== Ayr United ===
In June 2023, Murphy signed a two-year deal with Championship club Ayr United. On 26 May 2026, it was announced that Murphy would be first team coach as well as continue as a player.

== International career ==
Murphy was a regular for both the Scotland under-19 team and the Scotland under-21 team. He scored four goals for the under-21 side as the team reached the play-offs of the European under-21 Championships.

Murphy received his first call-up to the Scotland squad on 10 March 2016, for their friendlies against Czech Republic and Denmark on 24 and 29 March. He was left unused. Murphy made his full international debut in a 1–0 home friendly defeat to Costa Rica on 23 March 2018, coming on as an 87th-minute substitute for Matt Ritchie. Murphy's second Scottish cap came in a friendly where Scotland lost 2–0 away to Peru where Murphy started the game. However, he was subbed off in the 63rd minute, replaced by Oli McBurnie.

== Career statistics ==
=== Club ===
As of 5 July 2022

Appearances and goals by club, season and competition
Club	Season	League			National cup		League cup		Other		Total	
Club	Season	Division	Apps	Goals	Apps	Goals	Apps	Goals	Apps	Goals	Apps	Goals
Motherwell	2006–07	Scottish Premier League	2	0	0	0	0	0	—		2	0
Motherwell	2007–08	Scottish Premier League	16	1	1	0	0	0	—		17	1
Motherwell	2008–09	Scottish Premier League	30	2	1	0	1	1	2 (Note: Appearance(s) in UEFA Cup)	0	34	3
Motherwell	2009–10	Scottish Premier League	35	6	1	0	2	0	6 (Note: Appearance(s) in UEFA Europa League)	4	44	10
Motherwell	2010–11	Scottish Premier League	35	6	6	3	2	0	6	3	49	12
Motherwell	2011–12	Scottish Premier League	36	9	3	4	1	0	—		40	13
Motherwell	2012–13	Scottish Premier League	22	10	2	1	1	0	4 (Note: Two appearances in UEFA Champions League; two appearances in UEFA Europa League)	0	29	11
Motherwell	Total		176	34	14	8	7	1	18	7	215	50
Sheffield United	2012–13	EFL League One	17	2	2	0	0	0	2 (Note: Appearance(s) in League One play-offs)	0	21	2
Sheffield United	2013–14	EFL League One	34	4	7	3	0	0	1 (Note: Appearance(s) in Football League Trophy)	0	42	7
Sheffield United	2014–15	EFL League One	43	11	6	1	6	0	3 (Note: Two appearances in League One play-offs; one appearance in Football League Trophy)	0	58	12
Sheffield United	2015–16	EFL League One	1	0	0	0	0	0	0	0	1	0
Sheffield United	Total		95	17	15	4	6	0	6	0	122	21
Brighton & Hove Albion	2015–16	EFL Championship	37	6	0	0	1	0	—		38	6
Brighton & Hove Albion	2016–17	EFL Championship	35	2	2	0	3	2	—		40	4
Brighton & Hove Albion	2017–18	Premier League	4	0	0	0	1	0	—		5	0
Brighton & Hove Albion	Total		76	8	2	0	5	2	0	0	83	10
Brighton & Hove Albion U21s	2017–18	—			—		—		1	1	1	1
Rangers (loan)	2017–18	Scottish Premiership	16	4	3	1	0	0	0	0	19	5
Rangers	2018–19	Scottish Premiership	2	0	0	0	1	0	5	1	8	1
Rangers	2019–20	Scottish Premiership	2	0	0	0	0	0	0	0	2	0
Rangers	2020–21	Scottish Premiership	0	0	0	0	0	0	0	0	0	0
Rangers	Total		20	4	3	1	1	0	5	1	29	6
Burton Albion (loan)	2019–20	League One	10	7	—		—		—		10	7
Hibernian (loan)	2020–21	Scottish Premiership	19	1	3 (Note: One appearance in the previous season's Scottish Cup which was rescheduled to October due to COVID-19)	0	4	1	—		26	2
Hibernian	2021–22	Scottish Premiership	18	2	1	0	2	0	3 (Note: Appearance(s) in UEFA Conference League)	1	24	3
Mansfield Town (loan)	2021–22	EFL League Two	14	1	—		—		2 (Note: Appearance(s) in League Two play-offs)	0	16	1
Career total			428	74	38	13	25	4	35	10	526	101

=== International ===
As of 29 May 2018

Appearances and goals by national team and year
National team	Year	Apps	Goals
Scotland	2018	2	0
Total		2	0

== Honours ==
Motherwell

- Scottish Cup runner-up: 2010–11

Brighton & Hove Albion

- EFL Championship runner-up: 2016–17
