= Sam Baldock =

English footballer (born 1989)

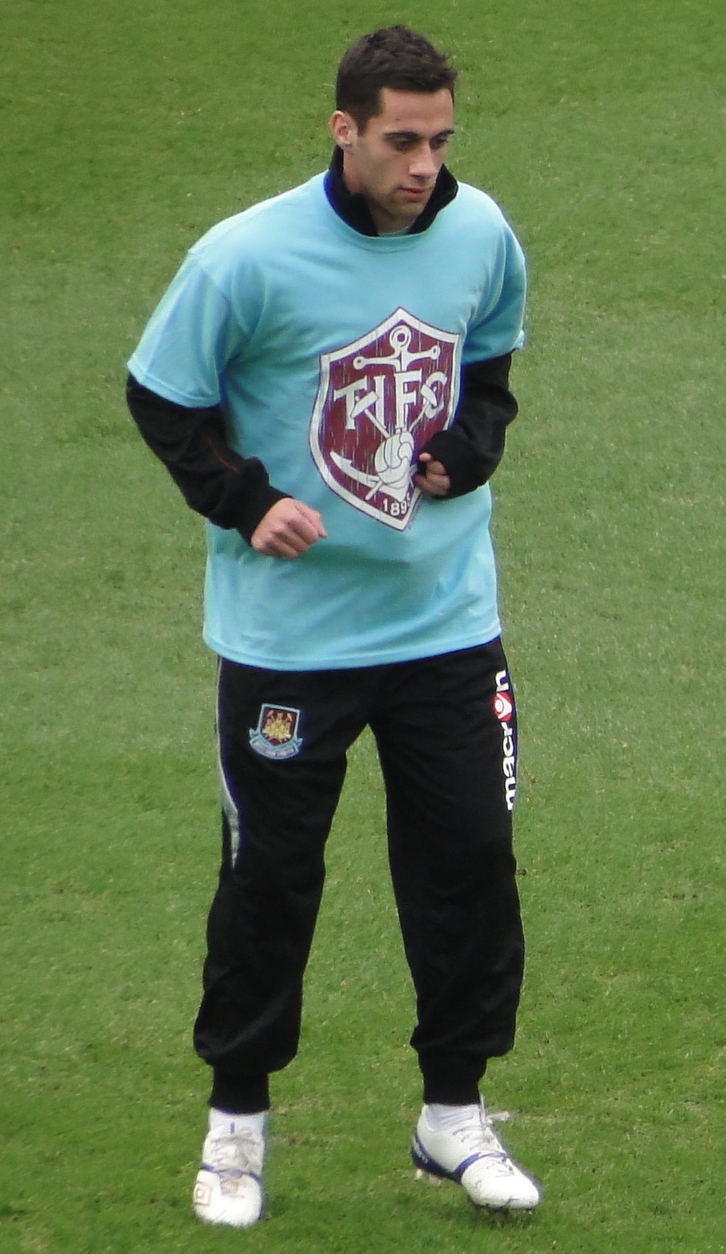
- Baldock warming up for West Ham United in 2012

Personal information
- Full name: Samuel Edward Thomas Baldock
- Date of birth: 15 March 1989 (age 37)
- Place of birth: Buckingham, England
- Height: 5 ft 7 in (1.70 m)
- Position: Striker

Youth career
- 2003–2004: Wimbledon
- 2004–2005: Milton Keynes Dons

Senior career*
Years	Team	Apps	(Gls)
2005–2011	Milton Keynes Dons	100	(33)
2011–2012	West Ham United	23	(5)
2012–2014	Bristol City	83	(34)
2014–2018	Brighton & Hove Albion	81	(18)
2018–2021	Reading	65	(10)
2021–2022	Derby County	13	(2)
2022–2023	Oxford United	11	(4)
Total		376	(106)

International career
2009	England U20	2	(0)
- * Club domestic league appearances and goals

Samuel Edward Thomas Baldock (born 15 March 1989) is an English former professional footballer who last played as a striker for Oxford United. He also played for Milton Keynes Dons, West Ham United, Bristol City, Brighton & Hove Albion, Reading, Derby County and made two appearances for England U20.

== Club career ==
=== Milton Keynes Dons ===
Baldock was born in Buckingham, Buckinghamshire. Having joined the Wimbledon F.C. youth system following the club's 2003 relocation to Milton Keynes, Baldock signed as a trainee in July 2004, just after the club renamed itself as Milton Keynes Dons. Danny Wilson handed Baldock his first-team debut on 20 December 2005 in the 2–1 Football League Trophy loss to Colchester United as a late substitute in his only appearance of the season.

Martin Allen as Dons manager for the 2006–07 season gave Baldock two further games in the first team in his only year in charge. Baldock failed to score as a substitute in either game as the Dons lost 4–1 away to Brighton & Hove Albion in the Football League Trophy and drew 1–1 at home to Mansfield Town.

As Paul Ince took the role as manager, Baldock became more involved in matches, first making a substitute appearance in the FA Cup away to Crewe Alexandra, before making five substitute appearances in League Two. He also made his full debut in the Football League Trophy victory over Gillingham, and made two further appearances as a substitute, including one in the 2008 Football League Trophy final at Wembley Stadium on 30 March 2008, helping MK Dons win their first ever trophy.

As new manager Roberto Di Matteo joined MK Dons, Baldock made his break-through season as he became a regular in the first-team, scoring his first senior goal in the Dons' 2–1 loss against Reading in a friendly match at stadium:mk on 19 July 2008. He then made his first competitive start in the MK Dons' opening day League One defeat to Leicester City on 9 August 2008. Baldock's first competitive goal came as the Dons beat Norwich City 1–0 in the Football League Cup at stadium:mk on 12 August 2008. On 4 September 2008, it was announced that Baldock had signed a contract extension with the club until summer 2010.

On 12 March 2011, having been named in the starting line-up to face Colchester United away, he scored his first ever senior hat-trick with all three goals coming in the second half to overturn a 1–0 half-time deficit. The final score was 3–1. On 15 May 2011, Baldock scored a long range free-kick in the play-off semi-final first leg as MK Dons beat Peterborough United 3–2 at stadium:mk. MK Dons lost in the second leg as Peterborough gained promotion, beating Huddersfield Town in the final.

On 29 June 2011, Peterborough United had a £1.2 million bid accepted for Baldock, however, after meeting with the club, Baldock decided to decline the offer to join Peterborough and pledged his future to MK Dons.

In August 2011 at the start of the 2011–12 season, Baldock scored six goals in six appearances including a hat-trick against newly promoted side Chesterfield in a 6–2 win and a goal in a 4–0 away victory in the League Cup against Premier League side Norwich City. Fittingly his last goals for the club came against the opponents he scored his first goal against, Norwich

=== West Ham United ===
On 26 August 2011, Baldock joined West Ham United for an undisclosed fee on a four-year contract with an option for an additional year. He was allocated the number 7 shirt. Baldock made his West Ham debut on 17 September 2011 coming on as a 74th-minute substitute for Henri Lansbury in a 0–0 draw away with Millwall. His first two West Ham goals were scored in 4–0 win on 15 October 2011 against Blackpool at Upton Park. He then got his second two-goal haul in successive home matches helping the Hammers to a 3–2 victory over Leicester City. Despite scoring five goals in his first six starts, an injury reduced his first-team opportunities, as did the arrival of Nicky Maynard and Ricardo Vaz Tê.

=== Bristol City ===
Baldock joined Bristol City in August 2012 for an undisclosed fee, signing a three-year contract. He made his debut on 25 August, in a 4–2 win against Cardiff, in which he scored and assisted a goal. He scored again on 15 September, in a 5–3 defeat at home to Blackburn Rovers and a brace in the club's following match, a 2–1 win away at Peterborough to take his tally to four goals in four matches for Bristol City. Baldock finished the 2012–13 season with ten goals but could not help Bristol City survive as they were relegated to League 1.

During the pre-season, Baldock failed to score but fellow striker Steven Davies moved to Blackpool leaving Baldock as the only recognised goal scorer at Bristol City. Sean O'Driscoll made Baldock captain at the start of the season and his first goal came in a 2–0 away win in the first round of the League Cup. He scored a brace against Coventry City in a 5–4 loss. He continued his great start by scoring his second brace of the season against old club MK Dons. He chose not to celebrate either goal after saying it was an emotional day. Baldock finished the League One 2013–14 season with the Golden Boot as top scorer with 24 goals.

=== Brighton & Hove Albion ===
On 27 August 2014, Baldock signed for Brighton & Hove Albion for an undisclosed fee in the region of £2 million.

=== Reading ===
On 30 July 2018, Baldock transferred to Reading on a three-year contract for an undisclosed fee. Baldock left Reading when his contract expired at the end of the 2020–21 season.

=== Derby County ===
On 17 August 2021, after training with the club over pre-season, Baldock joined Derby County on a short-term contract until January 2022. A day after signing he made his debut scoring the only goal of the game in the 1–0 away victory over Hull City. On 13 January 2022, manager Wayne Rooney announced that Baldock would leave the club upon the expiration of his short-term deal the following week.

=== Oxford United ===
On 4 February 2022, Baldock signed a contract with League One club Oxford United until the end of the season. He scored in his first League One start for Oxford, netting the third goal in a 4–0 away victory over Charlton on 19 February 2022. On 16 May 2022, he signed a new two-year deal with the club. Baldock retired because of injury on 14 September 2023 and accepted a role at Oxford United as a business development analyst.

== International career ==
On 26 August 2009, Baldock was called up to an initial 30-man squad for the 2009 FIFA U-20 World Cup in Egypt. Later, on 11 September, he made the final squad of 21 players, MK Dons chairman Pete Winkelman commented: "The standard of players he will now be rubbing shoulders with underlines what a wonderful talent he is."

== Personal life ==
Born in England, Baldock is of Greek descent through his grandmother. His late younger brother George was also a professional footballer, and his other brother James is the club doctor at Sam's former club Oxford United.

== Career statistics ==
Appearances and goals by club, season and competition
Club	Season	League			FA Cup		League Cup		Other		Total	
Club	Season	Division	Apps	Goals	Apps	Goals	Apps	Goals	Apps	Goals	Apps	Goals
Milton Keynes Dons	2005–06	League One	0	0	0	0	0	0	1 (Note: Appearance(s) in Football League Trophy)	0	1	0
Milton Keynes Dons	2006–07	League Two	1	0	0	0	0	0	1	0	2	0
Milton Keynes Dons	2007–08	League Two	5	0	1	0	0	0	3	0	9	0
Milton Keynes Dons	2008–09	League One	40	12	0	0	2	1	2 (Note: Appearances in Football League play-offs)	0	44	13
Milton Keynes Dons	2009–10	League One	21	5	3	2	0	0	4	3	28	10
Milton Keynes Dons	2010–11	League One	29	12	2	0	1	1	2	1	34	14
Milton Keynes Dons	2011–12	League One	4	4	—		2	2	—		6	6
Milton Keynes Dons	Total		100	33	6	2	5	4	13	4	124	43
West Ham United	2011–12	Championship	23	5	1	0	—		—		24	5
Bristol City	2012–13	Championship	34	10	0	0	—		—		34	10
Bristol City	2013–14	League One	45	24	4	1	3	1	2	0	54	26
Bristol City	2014–15	League One	4	0	—		0	0	—		4	0
Bristol City	Total		83	34	4	1	3	1	2	0	92	36
Brighton & Hove Albion	2014–15	Championship	20	3	2	1	0	0	—		22	4
Brighton & Hove Albion	2015–16	Championship	28	4	1	0	2	0	2	0	33	4
Brighton & Hove Albion	2016–17	Championship	31	11	0	0	3	1	—		34	12
Brighton & Hove Albion	2017–18	Premier League	2	0	3	0	0	0	—		5	0
Brighton & Hove Albion	Total		81	18	6	1	5	1	2	0	94	20
Reading	2018–19	Championship	21	5	0	0	2	0	—		23	5
Reading	2019–20	Championship	24	5	2	1	2	0	—		28	6
Reading	2020–21	Championship	20	0	1	0	2	0	—		23	0
Reading	Total		65	10	3	1	6	0	0	0	74	11
Derby County	2021–22	Championship	13	2	1	0	0	0	—		14	2
Oxford United	2021–22	League One	7	4	0	0	0	0	—		7	4
Oxford United	2022–23	League One	4	0	0	0	0	0	—		4	0
Oxford United	2023–24	League One	0	0	0	0	0	0	—		0	0
Oxford United	Total		11	4	0	0	0	0	0	0	11	4
Career total			376	106	21	5	19	6	17	4	433	121

== Honours ==
Milton Keynes Dons

- Football League Two: 2007–08
- Football League Trophy: 2007–08

West Ham United

- Football League Championship play-offs: 2012

Brighton & Hove Albion

- EFL Championship runner up: 2016–17

Individual

- Football League Young Player of the Month: August 2010
- Football League One Golden Boot: 2013–14
- Bristol City Player of the Year: 2013–14
