= 2015–16 Brighton & Hove Albion F.C. season =

114th season in existence of Brighton & Hove Albion

Brighton & Hove Albion
2015–16 season
- Chairman: Tony Bloom
- Manager: Chris Hughton
- Stadium: Falmer Stadium
- Championship: 3rd
- FA Cup: Third round
- League Cup: Second round
- Top goalscorer: League: Tomer Hemed (17); All: Tomer Hemed (17)
| Home colours | Away colours | Third colours |

The 2015–16 season was Brighton & Hove Albion's 114th year in existence and fifth consecutive season in the Championship. Along with competing in the Championship, the club also participated in the FA Cup and League Cup. The season covers the period from 1 July 2015 to 30 June 2016.

Brighton enjoyed a much improved season after narrowly avoiding relegation the season prior, finishing an impressive 3rd place in the Championship table below Middlesbrough only on an inferior goal difference of two goals. Brighton only lost five games throughout the entire season, a feat matched by champions Burnley who only finished with four more points than Brighton.

The season began in spectacular fashion for Brighton, where they embarked on a 21-game unbeaten run that saw them occupy an automatic promotion place for much of the first half of the season. However, they would then lose four out of their five following games, dropping out of the top two and only sporadically occupying second place throughout the season, fighting a fierce contest with promotion rivals Hull City, Derby County, Middlesbrough and Burnley. After this mid-season dip in form, Brighton would only lose one more game throughout the rest of the season, and went into the final game of the Championship season away at second-placed Middlesbrough level on points with them but behind them on goal difference, knowing only a win would secure automatic promotion. The two teams drew 1–1, and Brighton finished the season in a play-off position instead.

A third play-off campaign for the Seagulls in four seasons ensued, however it would again end in defeat at the semi-final stage for a third time, as Brighton lost 3–1 on aggregate over two legs against Sheffield Wednesday.

== Squad ==
Note: Flags indicate national team as defined under FIFA eligibility rules; some limited exceptions apply. Players may hold more than one non-FIFA nationality.

| No. | Pos. | Nation | Player |
|---|---|---|---|
| 1 | GK | FIN | Niki Mäenpää |
| 2 | DF | ESP | Bruno |
| 3 | DF | SCO | Gordon Greer (captain) |
| 4 | DF | GER | Uwe Hünemeier |
| 5 | DF | ENG | Lewis Dunk |
| 6 | MF | ENG | Dale Stephens |
| 7 | MF | ISR | Beram Kayal |
| 8 | MF | WAL | Andrew Crofts |
| 9 | FW | ENG | Sam Baldock |
| 10 | FW | ISR | Tomer Hemed |
| 12 | DF | CMR | Gaëtan Bong |
| 13 | GK | ENG | David Stockdale |
| 14 | DF | ESP | Iñigo Calderón (vice captain) |
| 15 | MF | SCO | Jamie Murphy |
| 16 | GK | DEN | Casper Ankergren |
| 17 | DF | ENG | Connor Goldson |

| No. | Pos. | Nation | Player |
|---|---|---|---|
| 19 | MF | NED | Elvis Manu |
| 20 | MF | ENG | Solly March |
| 21 | FW | ENG | James Wilson |
| 22 | MF | NED | Danny Holla |
| 23 | DF | ENG | Liam Rosenior |
| 24 | MF | ENG | Rohan Ince |
| 25 | FW | ENG | Bobby Zamora |
| 26 | DF | IRL | Glen Rea |
| 27 | MF | FRA | Anthony Knockaert |
| 28 | DF | ENG | Adam Chicksen |
| 29 | MF | IRL | Richie Towell |
| 30 | MF | COD | Kazenga LuaLua |
| 33 | DF | ENG | Liam Ridgewell |
| 36 | MF | ENG | Steve Sidwell |
| 38 | MF | CZE | Jiri Skalak |

=== Development squad and youth team ===
Note: Flags indicate national team as defined under FIFA eligibility rules; some limited exceptions apply. Players may hold more than one non-FIFA nationality.

| No. | Pos. | Nation | Player |
|---|---|---|---|
| 31 | GK | ENG | Christian Walton |
| — | GK | IRL | Harry Doherty |
| — | GK | ESP | Robert Sanchez |
| — | GK | ENG | Josh Smith |
| — | DF | ENG | Ben Barclay |
| — | DF | ENG | Dylan Barnett |
| — | DF | ENG | Tom Dallison |
| — | DF | ENG | Rob Hunt |
| — | MF | ENG | Will Collar |
| — | MF | IRL | Dessie Hutchinson |
| — | MF | ENG | Connor Pring |
| — | MF | ENG | Jesse Starkey |

| No. | Pos. | Nation | Player |
|---|---|---|---|
| — | MF | WAL | Connor Tighe |
| — | MF | ENG | Joe Ward |
| — | FW | ENG | Daniel Akindayini |
| — | FW | ENG | Jason Davis |
| — | FW | SCO | Jack Harper |
| — | FW | FIN | Vahid Hambo |
| — | FW | WAL | Chike Kandi |
| — | FW | ENG | James Tilley |
| — | FW | ENG | Robin Deen |
| — | FW | ISL | Ragnar Mar Larusson |
| — | FW | NOR | Henrik Bjørdal |
| — | FW | ENG | Jonah Ayunga |

=== Out on loan ===
Note: Flags indicate national team as defined under FIFA eligibility rules; some limited exceptions apply. Players may hold more than one non-FIFA nationality.

| No. | Pos. | Nation | Player |
|---|---|---|---|
| 11 | FW | ENG | Chris O'Grady (on loan at Nottingham Forest) |
| 18 | MF | ENG | Jake Forster-Caskey (on loan at Milton Keynes Dons) |

== Transfers ==
=== Transfers in ===
| Date from | Position | Nationality | Name | From | Fee | Ref. |
|---|---|---|---|---|---|---|
| 1 July 2015 | CF | ISR | Tomer Hemed | Almería | £1,000,000 | |
| 1 July 2015 | RB | ENG | Liam Rosenior | Hull City | Free transfer | |
| 1 July 2015 | LW | ENG | Joe Ward | Chelmsford City | Undisclosed | |
| 2 July 2015 | CF | NGA | Daniel Akindayini | Tottenham Hotspur | Free transfer | |
| 2 July 2015 | LB | CMR | Gaëtan Bong | Wigan Athletic | Free transfer | |
| 6 July 2015 | GK | FIN | Niki Mäenpää | VVV-Venlo | Free transfer | |
| 22 July 2015 | CF | FIN | Vahid Hambo | Inter Turku | Undisclosed | |
| 23 July 2015 | CF | SCO | Jack Harper | Real Madrid | Undisclosed | |
| 3 August 2015 | CF | ENG | Bobby Zamora | Queens Park Rangers | Free transfer | |
| 12 August 2015 | CB | GER | Uwe Hünemeier | SC Paderborn | £1,750,000 | |
| 14 August 2015 | LW | SCO | Jamie Murphy | Sheffield United | £1,500,000 | |
| 19 August 2015 | RB | ENG | Connor Goldson | Shrewsbury Town | Undisclosed | |
| 29 August 2015 | LW | NED | Elvis Manu | Feyenoord | £1,500,000 | |
| 2 January 2016 | AM | IRL | Richie Towell | Dundalk | Undisclosed | |
| 11 January 2016 | RW | FRA | Anthony Knockaert | Standard Liège | Undisclosed | |
| 27 January 2016 | RW | NOR | Henrik Bjørdal | Aalesund | Undisclosed | |
| 1 February 2016 | CF | ENG | Jonah Ayunga | Dorchester Town | Undisclosed | |
| 1 February 2016 | CF | CZE | Jiří Skalák | Mladá Boleslav | Undisclosed | |

Total outgoing: ▼£5,750,000

=== Transfers out ===
| Date from | Position | Nationality | Name | To | Fee | Ref. |
|---|---|---|---|---|---|---|
| 1 July 2015 | CM | ENG | Bradley Barry | Swindon Town | Free transfer | |
| 1 July 2015 | AM | ENG | George Cole | Free Agent | Released | |
| 1 July 2015 | CF | IRL | Shamir Fenelon | Crawley Town (Note: Following Fenelon's release he joined Crawley Town.) | Free transfer | |
| 1 July 2015 | LW | NIR | Paddy McCourt | Luton Town | Free transfer | |
| 1 July 2015 | CF | ENG | Jimmy Muitt | Free Agent | Released | |
| 1 July 2015 | CB | GHA | Daniel Pappoe | Free Agent | Released | |
| 1 July 2015 | CF | ENG | Cameron Wiltshire | Free Agent | Released | |
| 1 August 2015 | CF | SCO | Craig Mackail-Smith | Luton Town | Free transfer | |
| 19 January 2016 | RM | ENG | Jeffrey Monakana | FC Voluntari | Free transfer | |

=== Loans in ===
| Date from | Position | Nationality | Name | From | Date until | Ref. |
|---|---|---|---|---|---|---|
| 26 November 2015 | RW | NED | Rajiv van La Parra | Wolverhampton Wanderers | 2 January 2016 | |
| 26 November 2015 | CF | ENG | James Wilson | Manchester United | End of season | |
| 2 January 2016 | CB | ENG | Liam Ridgewell | Portland Timbers | 13 February 2016 | |
| 25 January 2016 | CM | ENG | Steve Sidwell | Stoke City | End of season | |

=== Loans out ===
| Date from | Position | Nationality | Name | To | Date until | Ref. |
|---|---|---|---|---|---|---|
| 21 July 2015 | GK | ENG | Christian Walton | Bury | 1 September 2015 (Note: On 1 September 2015, Walton returned from his loan spell due to injury.) | |
| 4 August 2015 | RM | ENG | Jeffrey Monakana | Bristol Rovers | 1 September 2015 | |
| 19 August 2015 | CB | ENG | Tom Dallison | Braintree Town | 19 September 2015 | |
| 28 August 2015 | MF | ENG | Charlie Harris | Aldershot Town | 26 September 2015 | |
| 28 August 2015 | CB | IRL | Glen Rea | Southend United | 2 January 2016 | |
| 1 September 2015 | CF | ENG | Chris O'Grady | Nottingham Forest | End of season | |
| 22 September 2015 | CM | ENG | Jake Forster-Caskey | Milton Keynes Dons | 24 October 2015 | |
| 24 September 2015 | CF | ENG | Robin Deen | Lewes | 22 October 2015 | |
| 2 October 2015 | LB | ENG | Adam Chicksen | Leyton Orient | 6 November 2015 | |
| 19 November 2015 | GK | ENG | Christian Walton | Plymouth Argyle | 3 January 2016 | |
| 8 January 2016 | CM | ENG | Jake Forster-Caskey | Milton Keynes Dons | End of season | |
| 27 January 2016 | LB | ENG | Adam Chicksen | Gillingham | 23 February 2016 | |
| 1 February 2016 | DM | ENG | Rohan Ince | Fulham | End of season | |
| 1 February 2016 | LW | NED | Elvis Manu | Huddersfield Town | 2 May 2016 | |

== Pre-season ==
=== Friendlies ===
On 5 May 2015, Brighton & Hove Albion announced four pre-season friendlies, Away to Lewes on 18 July 2015, Away to Crawley Town on 22 July 2015, Away to Aberdeen on 26 July 2015 and Away to Gillingham on 29 July 2015. On 25 May 2015, Brighton & Hove Albion announced they will face 2015 Europa League finalists Sevilla at home on 2 August 2015. On 23 June 2015, Brighton & Hove albion announced Swiss opposition for 11 July 2015.

| 11 July 2015 Friendly | Meyrin | 1–6 | Brighton & Hove Albion | Meyrin, Switzerland |
| 15:00 CEST | Belladon 12' | Report | Hemed 3'; Ince 29'; Bruno 35'; Starkey 40'; Tilley 57'; O'Grady 73' | Stadium: Stade des Arbères |

| 15 July 2015 Friendly | Southampton | 1–0 | Brighton & Hove Albion | Southampton |
| 14:00 BST | McQueen 90' | Report | | Stadium: Staplewood Training Ground |

| 18 July 2015 Friendly | Lewes | 0–0 | Brighton & Hove Albion | Lewes |
| 15:00 BST | | Report | | Stadium: The Dripping Pan |

| 22 July 2015 Friendly | Crawley Town | 0–3 | Brighton & Hove Albion | Crawley |
| 19:45 BST | | Report | Stephens 16'; Hemed 23'; Kayal 28' | Stadium: Broadfield Stadium |

| 26 July 2015 Friendly | Aberdeen | 1–0 | Brighton & Hove Albion | Aberdeen, Scotland |
| 15:00 BST | Rooney 75' | Report | | Stadium: Pittodrie Stadium |

| 29 July 2015 Friendly | Gillingham | 1–2 | Brighton & Hove Albion | Gillingham |
| 19:45 BST | Dack 47' | Report | Stephens 56'; Kandi 66' | Stadium: Priestfield Stadium |

| 2 August 2015 Friendly | Brighton & Hove Albion | 1–0 | Sevilla | Brighton |
| 16:00 BST | Hemed 18' (pen.) | Report | | Stadium: Falmer Stadium |

== Competitions ==
=== Championship ===
==== League table ====
| Pos | Team | Pld | W | D | L | GF | GA | GD | Pts | Promotion, qualification or relegation |
|---|---|---|---|---|---|---|---|---|---|---|
| 1 | Burnley (C, P) | 46 | 26 | 15 | 5 | 72 | 35 | +37 | 93 | Promotion to the Premier League |
| 2 | Middlesbrough (P) | 46 | 26 | 11 | 9 | 63 | 31 | +32 | 89 | Promotion to the Premier League |
| 3 | Brighton & Hove Albion | 46 | 24 | 17 | 5 | 72 | 42 | +30 | 89 | Qualification for the Championship play-offs (Note: Four teams play for one spot and promotion to the Premier League.) |
| 4 | Hull City (O, P) | 46 | 24 | 11 | 11 | 69 | 35 | +34 | 83 | Qualification for the Championship play-offs |
| 5 | Derby County | 46 | 21 | 15 | 10 | 66 | 43 | +23 | 78 | Qualification for the Championship play-offs |

Source: BBC Sport
Rules for classification: 1) Points; 2) Goal difference; 3) Number of goals scored
(C) Champions; (O) Play-off winners; (P) Promoted

==== Results summary ====
| Overall | | | | | | | | Home | | | | | | Away | | | | | |
| Pld | W | D | L | GF | GA | GD | Pts | W | D | L | GF | GA | GD | W | D | L | GF | GA | GD |
|---|---|---|---|---|---|---|---|---|---|---|---|---|---|---|---|---|---|---|---|
| 46 | 24 | 17 | 5 | 72 | 42 | +30 | 89 | 15 | 5 | 3 | 40 | 18 | +22 | 9 | 12 | 2 | 32 | 24 | +8 |

Last updated: 7 May 2016.

==== Results round by round ====
| Round | 1 | 2 | 3 | 4 | 5 | 6 | 7 | 8 | 9 | 10 | 11 | 12 | 13 | 14 | 15 | 16 | 17 | 18 | 19 | 20 | 21 | 22 | 23 | 24 | 25 | 26 | 27 | 28 | 29 | 30 | 31 | 32 | 33 | 34 | 35 | 36 | 37 | 38 | 39 | 40 | 41 | 42 | 43 | 44 | 45 | 46 |
|---|---|---|---|---|---|---|---|---|---|---|---|---|---|---|---|---|---|---|---|---|---|---|---|---|---|---|---|---|---|---|---|---|---|---|---|---|---|---|---|---|---|---|---|---|---|---|
| Ground | H | A | A | H | A | H | H | A | A | H | A | H | H | A | A | H | A | H | H | A | A | H | A | H | H | A | A | H | H | H | A | A | A | H | A | H | H | A | H | A | A | H | H | H | H | A |
| Result | W | W | D | W | W | W | W | D | D | D | W | W | D | D | D | W | D | W | W | D | D | L | D | L | L | L | W | W | W | W | D | L | W | W | D | D | W | W | D | W | W | W | W | W | D | D |
| Position | 1 | 1 | 2 | 2 | 1 | 1 | 1 | 1 | 1 | 1 | 1 | 1 | 1 | 1 | 3 | 2 | 2 | 1 | 1 | 1 | 2 | 3 | 4 | 4 | 4 | 6 | 5 | 3 | 3 | 4 | 3 | 3 | 4 | 4 | 4 | 4 | 2 | 2 | 3 | 3 | 3 | 2 | 3 | 3 | 3 | 3 |

Updated to match(es) played on 7 May 2016. Source:
A = Away; H = Home; W = Win; D = Draw; L = Loss

==== Matches ====
On 17 June 2015, the fixtures for the forthcoming season were announced.

| 7 August 2015 1 | Brighton & Hove Albion | 1–0 | Nottingham Forest | Brighton |
| 19:45 BST | LuaLua 50' | Report | | Stadium: Falmer Stadium; Attendance: 24,623; Referee: Keith Stroud |

| 15 August 2015 2 | Fulham | 1–2 | Brighton & Hove Albion | Fulham |
| 15:00 BST | Cairney 43' | Report | Baldock 30'; Hemed 90+4' (pen.) | Stadium: Craven Cottage; Attendance: 19,029; Referee: Neil Swarbrick |

| 18 August 2015 3 | Huddersfield Town | 1–1 | Brighton & Hove Albion | Huddersfield |
| 19:45 BST | Butterfield 54' | Report | Kayal 1' | Stadium: John Smith's Stadium; Attendance: 10,168; Referee: Eddie Ilderton |

| 22 August 2015 4 | Brighton & Hove Albion | 1–0 | Blackburn Rovers | Brighton |
| 15:15 BST | LuaLua 35' | Report | | Stadium: Falmer Stadium; Attendance: 22,659; Referee: Andy Madley |

| 29 August 2015 5 | Ipswich Town | 2–3 | Brighton & Hove Albion | Ipswich |
| 15:00 BST | Sears 54'; McGoldrick 65' (pen.) | Report | LuaLua 10'; Hemed 12', 67' | Stadium: Portman Road; Attendance: 21,034; Referee: Keith Hill |

| 12 September 2015 6 | Brighton & Hove Albion | 1–0 | Hull City | Brighton |
| 15:00 BST | Hemed 5' | Report | | Stadium: Falmer Stadium; Attendance: 24,815; Referee: Simon Hooper |

| 15 September 2015 7 | Brighton & Hove Albion | 2–1 | Rotherham United | Brighton |
| 19:45 BST | Hemed 27'; Stephens 67' | Report | Clarke-Harris 71' | Stadium: Falmer Stadium; Attendance: 21,397; Referee: James Linington |

| 19 September 2015 8 | Wolverhampton Wanderers | 0–0 | Brighton & Hove Albion | Wolverhampton |
| 15:00 BST | | Report | | Stadium: Molineux Stadium; Attendance: 20,382; Referee: Jeremy Simpson |

| 26 September 2015 9 | Bolton Wanderers | 2–2 | Brighton & Hove Albion | Bolton |
| 15:00 BST | Danns 41'; Madine 90+4' | Report | Stephens 31'; Murphy 35' (red card) 75' | Stadium: Macron Stadium; Attendance: 13,405; Referee: Mark Haywood |

| 3 October 2015 10 | Brighton & Hove Albion | 1–1 | Cardiff City | Brighton |
| 15:00 BST | Stephens 38' | Report | Mason 5' | Stadium: Falmer Stadium; Attendance: 26,399; Referee: Charles Breakspear |

| 17 October 2015 11 | Leeds United | 1–2 | Brighton & Hove Albion | Leeds |
| 15:00 BST | Cooper 22' | Report | March 14'; Zamora 89' | Stadium: Elland Road; Attendance: 22,736; Referee: Darren Deadman |

| 20 October 2015 12 | Brighton & Hove Albion | 2–1 | Bristol City | Brighton |
| 19:45 BST | Baldock 53'; Zamora 82' | Report | Williams 17' | Stadium: Falmer Stadium; Attendance: 23,181; Referee: Iain Williamson |

| 24 October 2015 13 | Brighton & Hove Albion | 0–0 | Preston North End | Brighton |
| 15:00 BST | | Report | | Stadium: Falmer Stadium; Attendance: 24,629; Referee: Andy Davies |

| 31 October 2015 14 | Reading | 1–1 | Brighton & Hove Albion | Reading |
| 15:00 GMT | Vydra 78' | Report | Murphy 51' | Stadium: Madejski Stadium; Attendance: 22,244; Referee: Neil Swarbrick |

| 3 November 2015 15 | Sheffield Wednesday | 0–0 | Brighton & Hove Albion | Sheffield |
| 19:45 GMT | | Report | | Stadium: Hillsborough Stadium; Attendance: 23,712; Referee: Kevin Wright |

| 7 November 2015 16 | Brighton & Hove Albion | 2–1 | Milton Keynes Dons | Brighton |
| 15:00 GMT | March 5'; Murphy 19' | Report | Maynard 23' | Stadium: Falmer Stadium; Attendance: 23,661; Referee: Dean Whitestone |

| 22 November 2015 17 | Burnley | 1–1 | Brighton & Hove Albion | Burnley |
| 13:15 GMT | Gray 4' (pen.) | Report | Zamora 1' | Stadium: Turf Moor; Attendance: 15,622; Referee: Simon Hooper |

| 28 November 2015 18 | Brighton & Hove Albion | 2–1 | Birmingham City | Brighton |
| 15:00 GMT | March 17'; Zamora 47' | Report | Toral 21' | Stadium: Falmer Stadium; Attendance: 27,242; Referee: Gavin Ward |

| 5 December 2015 19 | Brighton & Hove Albion | 3–2 | Charlton Athletic | Brighton |
| 15:00 GMT | Wilson 50'; Zamora 83'; Hemed 85' | Report | Lookman 2'; Ghoochannejhad 5'; Bauer (red card) 58' | Stadium: Falmer Stadium; Attendance: 24,587; Referee: Keith Stroud |

| 12 December 2015 20 | Derby County | 2–2 | Brighton & Hove Albion | Derby |
| 15:00 GMT | Johnson 41'; Martin 88' (pen.) | Report | Wilson 22' van La Parra 75' | Stadium: Pride Park Stadium; Attendance: 30,537; Referee: Lee Mason |

| 15 December 2015 21 | Queens Park Rangers | 2–2 | Brighton & Hove Albion | Shepherd's Bush |
| 19:45 GMT | Austin 65', 88' | Report | Stephens 53' van La Parra 55'; Dunk (yellow card) 84' (red card) | Stadium: Loftus Road; Attendance: 15,268; Referee: Paul Tierney |

| 19 December 2015 22 | Brighton & Hove Albion | 0–3 | Middlesbrough | Brighton |
| 12:30 GMT | | Report | Kike 4'; Adomah 44'; Stuani 62' | Stadium: Falmer Stadium; Attendance: 26,445; Referee: Craig Pawson |

| 26 December 2015 23 | Brentford | 0–0 | Brighton & Hove Albion | Brentford |
| 13:00 GMT | | Report | | Stadium: Griffin Park; Attendance: 12,202; Referee: Darren Deadman |

| 29 December 2015 24 | Brighton & Hove Albion | 0–1 | Ipswich Town | Brighton |
| 19:45 GMT | | Report | Murphy 32' | Stadium: Falmer Stadium; Attendance: 27,689; Referee: Stuart Attwell |

| 1 January 2016 25 | Brighton & Hove Albion | 0–1 | Wolverhampton Wanderers | Brighton |
| 15:00 GMT | | Report | Goldson 32' (o.g.) | Stadium: Falmer Stadium; Attendance: 26,321; Referee: Chris Kavanagh |

| 12 January 2016 26 | Rotherham United | 2–0 | Brighton & Hove Albion | Rotherham |
| 19:45 GMT | Ward 45'; Derbyshire 86' | Report | | Stadium: New York Stadium; Attendance: 9,269; Referee: Oliver Langford |

| 16 January 2016 27 | Blackburn Rovers | 0–1 | Brighton & Hove Albion | Blackburn |
| 15:00 GMT | | Report | Zamora 3' | Stadium: Ewood Park; Attendance: 12,930; Referee: Kevin Wright |

| 23 January 2016 28 | Brighton & Hove Albion | 2–1 | Huddersfield Town | Brighton |
| 15:00 GMT | Zamora 30'; Wilson 66' | Report | Bunn 45'; Smith (yellow card) 84' (red card) | Stadium: Falmer Stadium; Attendance: 25,367; Referee: Graham Horwood |

| 5 February 2016 29 | Brighton & Hove Albion | 3–0 | Brentford | Brighton |
| 19:45 GMT | Knockaert 27'; Hemed 43'; Murphy 90+3' | Report | | Stadium: Falmer Stadium; Attendance: 24,096; Referee: Keith Stroud |

| 13 February 2016 30 | Brighton & Hove Albion | 3–2 | Bolton Wanderers | Brighton |
| 15:00 GMT | Murphy 11'; Hemed 43'; Kayal 58' | Report | Heskey 22'; Spearing 52' | Stadium: Falmer Stadium; Attendance: 26,717; Referee: Robert Lewis |

| 16 February 2016 31 | Hull City | 0–0 | Brighton & Hove Albion | Kingston upon Hull |
| 19:45 GMT | | Report | | Stadium: KC Stadium; Attendance: 17,321; Referee: Andy Madley |

| 20 February 2016 32 | Cardiff City | 4–1 | Brighton & Hove Albion | Cardiff |
| 12:30 GMT | Whittingham 16', 66' (pen.); Pilkington 19'; Immers 30' | Report | Stephens 55' | Stadium: Cardiff City Stadium; Attendance: 14,143; Referee: Darren Bond |

| 23 February 2016 33 | Bristol City | 0–4 | Brighton & Hove Albion | Bristol |
| 19:45 GMT | | Report | Murphy 8'; Baldock 21'; Hemed 56'; Little 75' (o.g.) | Stadium: Ashton Gate Stadium; Attendance: 15,256; Referee: David Coote |

| 29 February 2016 34 | Brighton & Hove Albion | 4–0 | Leeds United | Brighton |
| 19:45 GMT | Hemed 18' (pen.), 28'; Cooper 22' (o.g.); Dunk 38' | Report | | Stadium: Falmer Stadium; Attendance: 25,150; Referee: Peter Bankes |

| 5 March 2016 35 | Preston North End | 0–0 | Brighton & Hove Albion | Preston |
| 15:00 GMT | | Report | | Stadium: Deepdale; Attendance: 11,881; Referee: Mark Heywood |

| 8 March 2016 36 | Brighton & Hove Albion | 0–0 | Sheffield Wednesday | Brighton |
| 15:00 GMT | | Report | | Stadium: Falmer Stadium; Attendance: 26,128; Referee: Darren Drysdale |

| 15 March 2016 37 | Brighton & Hove Albion | 1–0 | Reading | Brighton |
| 19:45 GMT | Wilson 25' | Report | | Stadium: Falmer Stadium; Attendance: 23,418; Referee: Steve Martin |

| 19 March 2016 38 | Milton Keynes Dons | 1–2 | Brighton & Hove Albion | Milton Keynes |
| 15:00 GMT | Kay 70'; McFadzean (red card) 71' | Report | Hemed 56' (pen.), 62' | Stadium: Stadium mk Attendance: 21,345; Referee: Chris Kavanagh |

| 2 April 2016 39 | Brighton & Hove Albion | 2–2 | Burnley | Brighton |
| 12:30 BST | Stephens 30'; Knockaert 45' | Report | Gray 33'; Keane 90+3' | Stadium: Falmer Stadium; Attendance: 29,683; Referee: Craig Pawson |

| 5 April 2016 40 | Birmingham City | 1–2 | Brighton & Hove Albion | Birmingham |
| 19:45 BST | Lafferty 16' | Report | Goldson 29'; Dunk 48' | Stadium: St Andrew's; Attendance: 16,143; Referee: Andy Madley |

| 11 April 2016 41 | Nottingham Forest | 1–2 | Brighton & Hove Albion | Nottingham |
| 19:45 BST | Blackstock 50' | Report | Dunk 27'; Sidwell 90+1' | Stadium: City Ground; Attendance: 17,642; Referee: Andy Davies |

| 15 April 2016 42 | Brighton & Hove Albion | 5–0 | Fulham | Brighton |
| 19:45 BST | Hemed 29' (pen.), 34', 79'; Bruno 54'; Knockaert 87' | Report | | Stadium: Falmer Stadium; Attendance: 28,505; Referee: Andy Woolmer |

| 19 April 2016 43 | Brighton & Hove Albion | 4–0 | Queens Park Rangers | Brighton |
| 19:45 BST | Knockaert 45+1', 84'; Skalak 51'; Goldson 73' | Report | | Stadium: Falmer Stadium; Attendance: 25,411; Referee: Mark Heywood |

| 23 April 2016 44 | Charlton Athletic | 1–3 | Brighton & Hove Albion | Charlton |
| 15:00 BST | Guðmundsson 51' | Report | Baldock 8'; Skalak 55'; Hemed 90+5' (pen.) | Stadium: The Valley; Attendance: 17,160; Referee: Simon Hooper |

| 2 May 2016 45 | Brighton & Hove Albion | 1–1 | Derby County | Brighton |
| 14:30 BST | Wilson 90+5'; Dunk (yellow card) 83' (red card) | Report | Weimann 71' | Stadium: Falmer Stadium; Attendance: 30,292; Referee: Bobby Madley |

| 7 May 2016 46 | Middlesbrough | 1–1 | Brighton & Hove Albion | Middlesbrough |
| 12:30 BST | Stuani 19' | Report | Stephens 55', (red card) 59' | Stadium: Riverside Stadium; Attendance: 33,806; Referee: Mike Dean |

===== Play-Offs =====
| 13 May 2016 Semi-Final 1st Leg | Sheffield Wednesday | 2–0 | Brighton & Hove Albion | Sheffield |
| 19:45 BST | Wallace 45'; Lee 73' | Report | | Stadium: Hillsborough Stadium; Attendance: 34,260; Referee: Andre Marriner |

| 16 May 2016 Semi-Final 2nd Leg | Brighton & Hove Albion | 1–1 (1–3 agg.) | Sheffield Wednesday | Brighton |
| 19:45 BST | Dunk 19' | Report | Wallace 28' | Stadium: Falmer Stadium; Attendance: 27,272; Referee: Roger East |

=== FA Cup ===
Brighton & Hove Albion entered the FA Cup in the third round, which was drawn on 7 December 2015. Brighton were drawn away against Hull City.

| 9 January 2016 Third round | Hull City | 1–0 | Brighton & Hove Albion | Kingston upon Hull |
| 15:00 GMT | Snodgrass 41' (pen.) | Report | | Stadium: KC Stadium; Attendance: 10,706; Referee: Geoff Eltringham |

=== League Cup ===
On 16 June 2015, the first round draw was made, Brighton & Hove Albion were drawn away against Southend United. In the second round, Brighton were drawn away to Walsall.

| 11 August 2015 First round | Southend United | 0–1 | Brighton & Hove Albion | Southend-on-Sea |
| 19:45 BST | | Report | LuaLua 90' | Stadium: Roots Hall; Attendance: 4,485; Referee: Iain Williamson |

| 25 August 2015 Second round | Walsall | 2–1 | Brighton & Hove Albion | Walsall |
| 19:45 BST | Lalkovič 65'; Henry 86' | Report | Forster-Caskey 39' (pen.) | Stadium: Bescot Stadium; Attendance: 2,968; Referee: Peter Bankes |

== Statistics ==
=== Goalscorers ===
As of 7 May 2016

| Rank | No. | Pos. | Name | Championship | FA Cup | League Cup | Total |
|---|---|---|---|---|---|---|---|
| 1 | 10 | FW | Tomer Hemed | 17 | 0 | 0 | 17 |
| 2 | 25 | FW | Bobby Zamora | 7 | 0 | 0 | 7 |
| 2 | 6 | MF | Dale Stephens | 7 | 0 | 0 | 7 |
| 4 | 15 | MF | Jamie Murphy | 6 | 0 | 0 | 6 |
| 5 | 21 | FW | James Wilson | 5 | 0 | 0 | 5 |
| 5 | 27 | MF | Anthony Knockaert | 5 | 0 | 0 | 5 |
| 7 | 9 | FW | Sam Baldock | 4 | 0 | 0 | 4 |
| 7 | 30 | MF | Kazenga LuaLua | 3 | 0 | 1 | 4 |
| 9 | 20 | MF | Solly March | 3 | 0 | 0 | 3 |
| 9 | 5 | DF | Lewis Dunk | 3 | 0 | 0 | 3 |
| 11 | 7 | MF | Beram Kayal | 2 | 0 | 0 | 2 |
| 11 | 27 | MF | Rajiv van La Parra | 2 | 0 | 0 | 2 |
| 11 | 38 | MF | Jiri Skalak | 2 | 0 | 0 | 2 |
| 11 | 17 | DF | Connor Goldson | 2 | 0 | 0 | 2 |
| 15 | 36 | MF | Steve Sidwell | 1 | 0 | 0 | 1 |
| 15 | 2 | DF | Bruno | 1 | 0 | 0 | 1 |
| 15 | 18 | MF | Jake Forster-Caskey | 0 | 0 | 1 | 1 |
| Own goals | | | | 2 | 0 | 0 | 2 |
| Total | | | | 72 | 0 | 2 | 74 |

=== Disciplinary record ===
As of 7 May 2016

| No. | Pos. | Name | Championship | | FA Cup | | League Cup | | Total | |
| No. | Pos. | Name | Yellow card | Red card | Yellow card | Red card | Yellow card | Red card | Yellow card | Red card |
|---|---|---|---|---|---|---|---|---|---|---|
| 6 | MF | Dale Stephens | 10 | 1 | 0 | 0 | 0 | 0 | 10 | 1 |
| 7 | MF | Beram Kayal | 9 | 0 | 0 | 0 | 0 | 0 | 9 | 0 |
| 5 | DF | Lewis Dunk | 7 | 2 | 1 | 0 | 1 | 0 | 9 | 2 |
| 30 | MF | Kazenga LuaLua | 7 | 0 | 0 | 0 | 0 | 0 | 7 | 0 |
| 2 | DF | Bruno | 5 | 0 | 0 | 0 | 0 | 0 | 5 | 0 |
| 3 | DF | Gordon Greer | 5 | 0 | 0 | 0 | 0 | 0 | 5 | 0 |
| 13 | GK | David Stockdale | 5 | 0 | 0 | 0 | 0 | 0 | 5 | 0 |
| 20 | MF | Solly March | 4 | 0 | 0 | 0 | 0 | 0 | 4 | 0 |
| 12 | DF | Gaëtan Bong | 3 | 0 | 0 | 0 | 1 | 0 | 4 | 0 |
| 10 | FW | Tomer Hemed | 3 | 0 | 0 | 0 | 0 | 0 | 3 | 0 |
| 23 | DF | Liam Rosenior | 3 | 0 | 0 | 0 | 0 | 0 | 3 | 0 |
| 14 | DF | Iñigo Calderón | 2 | 0 | 1 | 0 | 0 | 0 | 3 | 0 |
| 17 | DF | Connor Goldson | 2 | 0 | 1 | 0 | 0 | 0 | 3 | 0 |
| 9 | FW | Sam Baldock | 2 | 0 | 0 | 0 | 0 | 0 | 2 | 0 |
| 25 | FW | Bobby Zamora | 2 | 0 | 0 | 0 | 0 | 0 | 2 | 0 |
| 27 | MF | Anthony Knockaert | 2 | 0 | 0 | 0 | 0 | 0 | 2 | 0 |
| 38 | MF | Jiri Skalak | 2 | 0 | 0 | 0 | 0 | 0 | 2 | 0 |
| 4 | DF | Uwe Hünemeier | 2 | 0 | 0 | 0 | 0 | 0 | 2 | 0 |
| 8 | MF | Andrew Crofts | 1 | 0 | 0 | 0 | 0 | 0 | 1 | 0 |
| 33 | DF | Liam Ridgewell | 1 | 0 | 0 | 0 | 0 | 0 | 1 | 0 |
| 15 | MF | Jamie Murphy | 0 | 1 | 0 | 0 | 0 | 0 | 0 | 1 |
| 18 | MF | Jake Forster-Caskey | 0 | 0 | 0 | 0 | 1 | 0 | 1 | 0 |
| 24 | MF | Rohan Ince | 0 | 0 | 0 | 0 | 1 | 0 | 1 | 0 |
| Totals | | | 77 | 4 | 3 | 0 | 4 | 0 | 84 | 4 |
