= 2007 Torneo di Viareggio =

2007 Torneo Mondiale di Calcio Coppa Carnevale
59° Torneo di Viareggio

Tournament details
- Host country: Italy
- City: Viareggio
- Dates: February 7, 2007 - February 19, 2007
- Teams: 48

Final positions
- Champions: (Italy) Genoa
- Runners-up: (Italy) Roma
- Third place: (Italy) Empoli
- Fourth place: (Belgium) Anderlecht

Tournament statistics
- Matches played: 88
- Goals scored: 277 (3.15 per match)
- Top scorer: (Italy) Davide Lanzafame (7)

The 2007 winners of the Torneo di Viareggio (in English, the Viareggio Tournament, officially the Viareggio Cup World Football Tournament Coppa Carnevale), the annual youth football tournament held in Viareggio, Tuscany, are listed below.

== Format ==
The 48 teams are seeded in 12 pools, split up into 6-pool groups. Each team from a pool meets the others in a single tie. The winning club from each pool and two best runners-up from both group A and group B progress to the final knockout stage. All matches in the final rounds are single tie. The Round of 16 envisions penalties and no extra time, while the rest of the final round matches include 30 minutes extra time and penalties to be played if the draw between teams still holds. Semifinal losing teams play 3rd-place final with penalties after regular time. The winning sides play the final with extra time and repeat the match if the draw holds.

== Participating teams ==
Italian teams

- (Italy) Ascoli
- (Italy) Atalanta
- (Italy) Benevento
- (Italy) Chievo Verona
- (Italy) Cesena
- (Italy) Cisco Roma
- (Italy) Empoli
- (Italy) Fiorentina
- (Italy) Genoa
- (Italy) Gubbio
- (Italy) Inter Milan
- (Italy) Juventus
- (Italy) Lecco
- (Italy) Livorno
- (Italy) Lazio
- (Italy) Milan
- (Italy) Modena
- (Italy) Montichiari
- (Italy) Napoli
- (Italy) Palermo
- (Italy) Parma
- (Italy) Pergocrema
- (Italy) Perugia
- (Italy) Piacenza
- (Italy) Pisa
- (Italy) Serie D Representatives
- (Italy) Reggina
- (Italy) Roma
- (Italy) Sampdoria
- (Italy) Siena
- (Italy) Torino
- (Italy) Treviso
- (Italy) Viareggio
- (Italy) Vicenza

European teams

- (Belgium) Anderlecht
- (Romania) Liberty Oradea
- San Marino
- (Serbia) OFK Belgrade
- (Russia) Spartak Moscow
- (Serbia) Red Star Belgrade

Asian teams

- (Israel) Maccabi Haifa
- (Malaysia) Malaysian Indian
- (Uzbekistan) Paxtakor

African Team

- (Senegal) A.S. De Camberene

American teams

- (United States) New York Stars
- (Uruguay) Juventud
- (Argentina) Arroyo Seco
- (Brazil) Santos
- (Mexico) Santos Laguna

Oceanian teams

- (Australia) APIA Tigers

== Group stage ==
=== Group 1 ===
Team	Pts	Pld	W	D	L	GF	GA
(Italy) Juventus	7	3	2	1	0	11	2
(Uruguay) Juventud	5	3	1	2	0	13	2
(Italy) Palermo	4	3	1	1	1	5	1
(Malaysia) Malaysian Indian	0	3	0	0	3	0	23

=== Group 2 ===
Team	Pts	Pld	W	D	L	GF	GA
(Brazil) Santos	7	3	2	1	0	7	1
(Italy) A.C. Milan	5	3	1	2	0	7	1
(Italy) Siena	4	3	1	1	1	4	1
(Australia) APIA Tigers	0	3	0	0	3	0	10

=== Group 3 ===
Team	Pts	Pld	W	D	L	GF	GA
(Italy) Atalanta	7	3	2	1	0	7	2
(Mexico) Santos Laguna	7	3	2	1	0	6	2
(Italy) Pisa	3	3	1	0	3	3	6
(Italy) Viareggio	0	3	0	0	3	2	7

=== Group 4 ===
Team	Pts	Pld	W	D	L	GF	GA
(Belgium) Anderlecht	9	3	3	0	0	5	1
(Italy) Roma	6	3	2	0	1	4	2
(Italy) Cisco Roma	3	3	1	0	2	3	3
(Senegal) A.S. De Camberene	0	3	0	0	3	0	6

=== Group 5 ===
Team	Pts	Pld	W	D	L	GF	GA
(Italy) Empoli	9	3	3	0	0	8	1
(Italy) Ascoli	4	3	1	1	1	2	3
(Serbia) Red Star Belgrade	2	3	0	2	1	2	3
(Italy) Lecco	0	3	0	0	3	2	7

=== Group 6 ===
Team	Pts	Pld	W	D	L	GF	GA
(Italy) Genoa	9	3	3	0	0	12	1
(Argentina) Arroyo Seco	4	3	1	1	1	4	4
(Italy) Reggina	3	3	1	0	2	4	5
(United States) New York Stars	1	3	0	1	2	3	13

=== Group 7 ===
Team	Pts	Pld	W	D	L	GF	GA
(Italy) Fiorentina	6	3	2	0	1	6	4
(Israel) Maccabi Haifa	5	3	1	2	0	4	2
(Italy) Pergocrema	4	3	1	1	1	3	4
(Italy) Napoli	1	3	0	1	2	2	5

=== Group 8 ===
Team	Pts	Pld	W	D	L	GF	GA
(Serbia) OFK Belgrade	7	3	2	1	0	10	3
(Italy) Torino	7	3	2	1	0	6	2
(Italy) Gubbio	3	3	1	0	2	4	8
(Italy) Perugia	0	3	0	0	3	2	9

=== Group 9 ===
Team	Pts	Pld	W	D	L	GF	GA
(Italy) Inter	7	3	2	1	0	6	4
(Italy) Piacenza	6	3	2	0	1	7	3
(Italy) Modena	4	3	1	1	1	3	5
San Marino	0	3	0	0	3	0	4

=== Group 10 ===
Team	Pts	Pld	W	D	L	GF	GA
(Italy) Sampdoria	9	3	3	0	0	10	1
(Romania) Liberty Oradea	6	3	2	0	1	6	4
(Italy) Montichiari	3	3	1	0	2	5	6
(Italy) Benevento	0	3	0	0	3	0	10

=== Group 11 ===
Team	Pts	Pld	W	D	L	GF	GA
(Italy) Vicenza	7	3	2	1	0	8	2
(Italy) Chievo Verona	6	3	2	0	1	6	3
(Italy) Livorno	2	3	0	2	1	3	4
(Italy) Treviso	1	3	0	1	2	2	10

=== Group 12 ===
Team	Pts	Pld	W	D	L	GF	GA
(Russia) Spartak Moscow	7	3	2	1	0	4	1
(Italy) Serie D Repress.	6	3	2	0	1	7	4
(Italy) Parma	3	3	1	0	2	3	4
(Uzbekistan) Pakhtakor	1	3	0	1	2	3	8

== Knockout stage ==
Round of 16
14 February
(Italy) Vicenza	0
(Italy) Roma	1
14 February
(Italy) Juventus	2
(Italy) Piacenza	3
14 February
(Italy) Sampdoria	1
(Brazil) Santos	0
14 February
(Belgium) Anderlecht	2
(Italy) Fiorentina	1
14 February
(Serbia) OFK Beograd	0
(Italy) Atalanta	3
14 February
(Italy) Empoli	1
(Italy) Torino	0
14 February
(Italy) Genoa (pen)	1 (8)
(Italy) Internazionale	1 (7)
14 February
(Russia) Spartak Moscow	5
(Mexico) Santos Laguna	3

Quarter-finals
15 February
(Italy) Roma	2
(Italy) Piacenza	1
15 February
(Italy) Sampdoria	0
(Belgium) Anderlecht (aet)	2
15 February
(Italy) Atalanta	1 (2)
(Italy) Empoli (pen)	1 (3)
15 February
(Italy) Genoa (aet)	2
(Russia) Spartak Moscow	1

Semi-finals
17 February
(Italy) Roma (pen)	0 (3)
(Belgium) Anderlecht	0 (0)
17 February
(Italy) Empoli	0 (2)
(Italy) Genoa (pen)	0 (3)

Final
19 February
(Italy) Roma	1
(Italy) Genoa	2
Third place
19 February
(Belgium) Anderlecht	0
(Italy) Empoli	5

== Champions ==
Torneo di Viareggio 2007 Champions

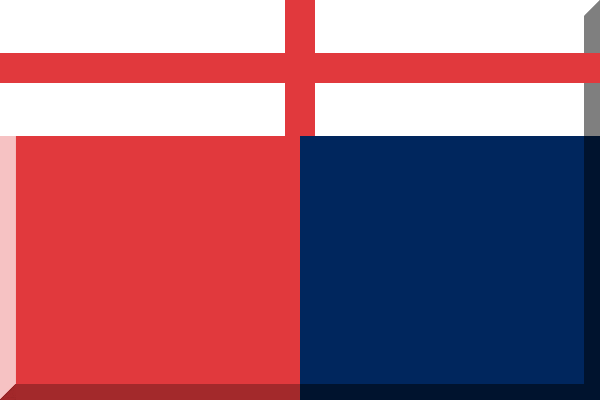

Genoa
2nd time

== Top goalscorers ==
7 goals

- (Italy) Davide Lanzafame ( (Italy) Juventus)

2 goals

- (Israel) Beram Kayal ( (Israel) Maccabi Haifa)

1 goal

- (Israel) Kfir Dar ( (Israel) Maccabi Haifa)
- (Israel) Tomer Hemed ( (Israel) Maccabi Haifa)
