= Richie Towell =

Irish footballer

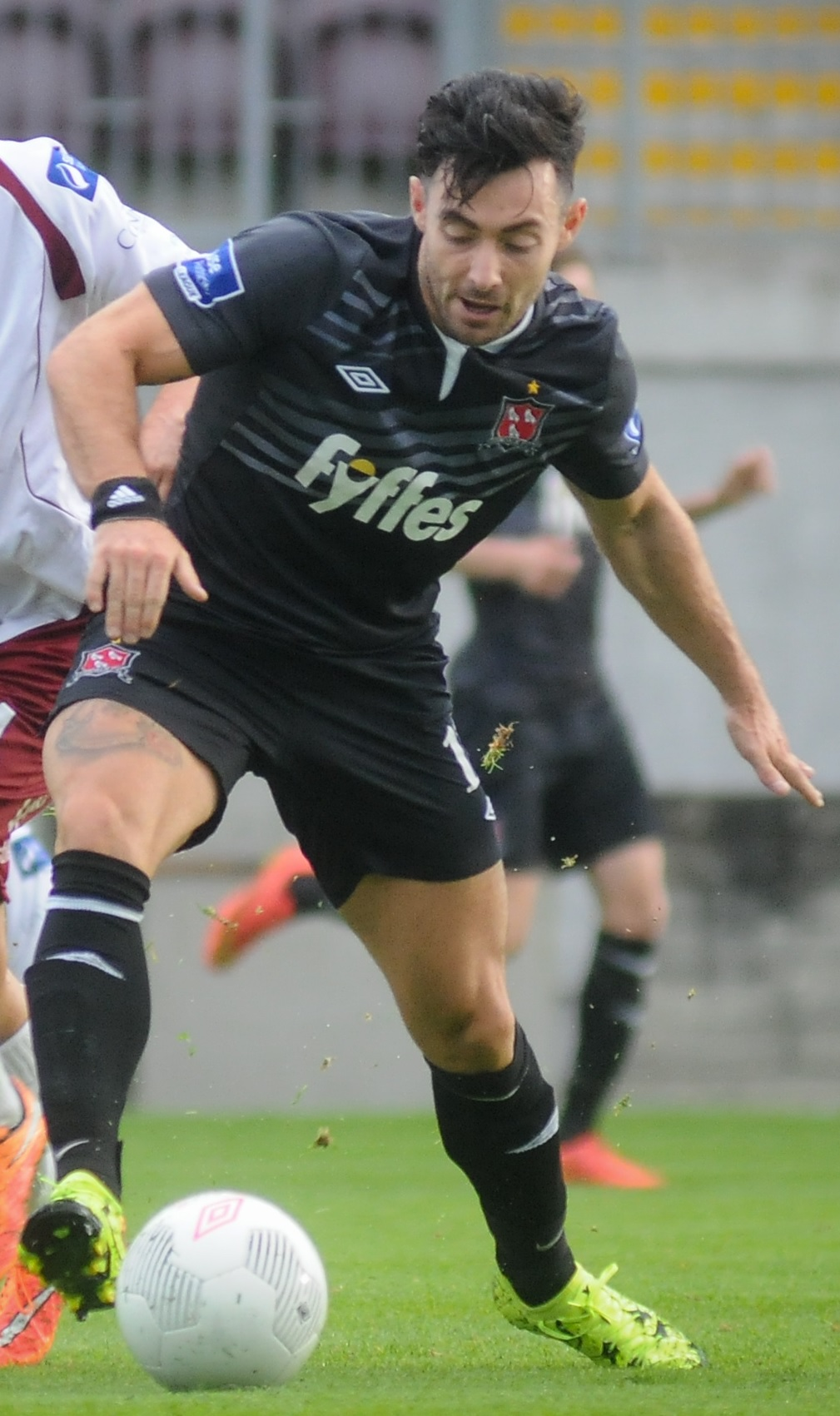
- Towell playing for Dundalk in 2015

Personal information
- Full name: Richard Patrick Towell
- Date of birth: 17 July 1991 (age 35)
- Place of birth: Inchicore, Dublin, Ireland
- Height: 1.73 m (5 ft 8 in)
- Position: Midfielder

Youth career
- Crumlin United
- 2007–2010: Celtic

Senior career*
Years	Team	Apps	(Gls)
2010–2012	Celtic	1	(0)
2011–2012	→ Hibernian (loan)	30	(1)
2013–2015	Dundalk	96	(43)
2015–2019	Brighton & Hove Albion	1	(0)
2017–2018	→ Rotherham United (loan)	39	(5)
2018–2019	→ Rotherham United (loan)	34	(4)
2019–2021	Salford City	50	(6)
2021–2024	Shamrock Rovers	85	(10)

International career^{‡}
2007–2008	Republic of Ireland U17	4	(0)
2009–2010	Republic of Ireland U19	6	(0)
2010–2012	Republic of Ireland U21	9	(0)
- * Club domestic league appearances and goals as of 13:02, 17 October 2024 (UTC) ‡ National team caps and goals as of 22:17, 14 September 2021 (UTC)

Richard Patrick Towell (born 17 July 1991) is an Irish former professional footballer who played as a midfielder.

Towell started his career with Scottish club Celtic and made his debut in the first half of the 2010–11 season. He then had two loan spells with Hibernian before leaving Celtic in 2012.

Towell has represented the Republic of Ireland under-21, under-19 and under-17 teams.

== Club career ==
=== Celtic ===
Towell started his career at Crumlin United and in 2007 moved to Celtic. In November 2010, he made his professional debut coming on as a substitute for Jos Hooiveld in the 57th minute of Celtic's 2–2 draw against Inverness, he provided an assist for Paddy McCourt.

==== Hibernian (loans) ====
On 25 January 2011, he joined Hibernian on loan until the end of the 2010–11 season. Towell made his debut a day later, in a 2–0 loss to Rangers. He was at fault for the concession of the second Rangers goal, as a misplaced pass allowed Nikica Jelavić a clear chance to score. Despite this bad start, Towell helped to solidify the Hibs defence during the latter part of the 2010–11 season. Hibs manager Colin Calderwood stated in April 2011 that he hoped to sign Towell for a longer period. Towell said in April 2011 that he received abuse from Hearts supporters in Edinburgh derby matches because he was Catholic. However, he also said that this made him more determined to play better. Towell returned to Celtic at the end of the season, having made 15 starting appearances for Hibs.

Towell re-signed on loan for Hibs on 25 August 2011, on a deal due to run until June 2012. He played the first match of his second loan spell only 3 days later, starting as Hibs lost 2–0 to Edinburgh derby rivals Hearts. Towell started to find first-team opportunities limited after new manager Pat Fenlon made several signings in the January transfer window. Two right backs and two central midfielders came in with one other right back going out. However, Fenlon said that once Towell had got his fitness levels up he would be back in the first team picture. Instead, Towell did not get the number of opportunities he was seeking and returned to Celtic after his loan finished. Towell then left the club and returned home to Ireland.

=== Dundalk ===
Upon his return to Ireland, Towell initially played for Leinster Senior League side Bluebell United. He was signed by Stephen Kenny for Dundalk in December 2012, ahead of the 2013 Airtricity Premier Division season.

Towell made his League of Ireland debut against Shamrock Rovers on the opening night of the 2013 season and was hugely influential in Dundalk's second-placed finish that year, scoring seven times in 31 league appearances. He also picked up the PFAI Young Player of the Year award. He won back to back league titles with Dundalk in 2014 and 2015 scoring 11 and 25 goals in the respective seasons, and got his first taste of UEFA Champions League football with the League of Ireland champions. He scored in the 2014–15 UEFA Europa League at Jeunesse Esch Jeunesse Esch-Dundalk 2015 History | UEFA Europa League.

==== 2015 season ====
On 9 October, Towell scored an 85th minute equalising penalty against Shamrock Rovers to win Dundalk their second consecutive league title, and followed this by scoring the only goal of the game in extra time in the FAI Cup Final against Cork City.

=== Brighton & Hove Albion ===
Towell signed for Brighton & Hove Albion on 30 November 2015. Towell made his debut for the Sussex club in the third round of the 2015–16 FA Cup on 9 January 2016 away against Hull City where The Seagulls lost 1–0 to a Robert Snodgrass penalty. Despite not playing a single league game in the 2015–16 Football League Championship season Towell made an appearance in the 2016 Championship play-offs as a substitute away against Sheffield Wednesday where Brighton were beaten 2-0 and 3–1 on aggregate. Towell scored his first goal for The Albion in a 3-1 FA Cup loss away to then National League side Lincoln on 28 January 2017. Towell's only league game with The Seagulls came against his then future loan club Rotherham United on 7 March 2017 where he came on as a substitute where Brighton won 2–0 at the New York Stadium. At the end of the season Brighton & Hove Albion were promoted to the Premier League. In May 2017, following Brighton's promotion to the Premier League, Towell signed a deal to keep him at the club until 2019.

==== Rotherham (loans) ====
On 31 August 2017, he signed for League One's Rotherham on a season-long loan where he helped them regain their Championship status, winning the 2018 EFL League One play-offs. On 31 August 2018 he returned to Rotherham United for a second season-long loan spell. He made 34 Championship appearances scoring 4 times as Rotherham were relegated back to League One.

=== Salford City ===
On 31 May 2019 Towell joined Salford City on a two-year contract. He made his début on the opening day of the 2019–20 season, a 2–0 victory against Stevenage. On Boxing Day, Towell opened the scoring with a "thunderbolt" in a 2–1 win over Crewe Alexandra on Boxing Day, helping Salford to their first victory in five games. On 19 January 2020, he was sent off in a 2–1 away victory against Forest Green Rovers after committing two bookable offences. He scored Salford's second in a 2–0 win against Macclesfield Town on 29 February.

=== Shamrock Rovers ===
At the end of the 2020–21 season, it was announced that Towell would be leaving the club to return to Ireland and join Shamrock Rovers. He scored his first goal against ŠK Slovan Bratislava in UEFA Champions League first qualifying round, but Rovers were eliminated 3–2 on aggregate.

== International career ==
In May 2008, Towell made his Republic of Ireland under-17 debut in a European championship match against Switzerland. He gained his second Ireland under-17 cap four days later, against Spain.

Towell made two appearances for Republic of Ireland under-21s in the 2011 UEFA European Under-21 Football Championship qualification campaign.

== Career statistics ==
As of match played on 3 October 2024

Appearances and goals by club, season and competition
Club	Season	League			National cup		League cup		Europe		Others		Total	
Club	Season	Division	Apps	Goals	Apps	Goals	Apps	Goals	Apps	Goals	Apps	Goals	Apps	Goals
Celtic	2010–11	Scottish Premier League	1	0	0	0	0	0	0 (Note: Appearances in UEFA Champions League & UEFA Europa League)	0	—		1	0
Hibernian (loan)	2010–11	Scottish Premier League	16	0	0	0	0	0	0 (Note: Appearances in UEFA Europa League)	0	—		16	0
Hibernian (loan)	2011–12	Scottish Premier League	14	1	1	0	1	0	—		—		16	1
Hibernian (loan)	Total		30	1	1	0	1	0	0	0	—		32	1
Dundalk	2013	LOI Premier Division	31	7	4	3	2	0	—		2 (Note: Appearances in Leinster Senior Cup)	0	39	10
Dundalk	2014	LOI Premier Division	33	11	4	0	1	0	4	2	6 (Note: one appearance in Leinster Senior Cup; five appearances, two goals in Setanta Sports Cup)	2	48	15
Dundalk	2015	LOI Premier Division	32	25	5	3	1	1	2 (Note: Appearances in UEFA Champions League)	0	2 (Note: One appearance in Leinster Senior Cup; one appearance, one goal in President of Ireland's Cup)	1	42	30
Dundalk	Total		96	43	13	6	4	1	6	2	10	3	129	55
Brighton & Hove Albion	2015–16	Championship	0	0	1	0	0	0	—		1 (Note: Appearances in Championship play-offs)	0	2	0
Brighton & Hove Albion	2016–17	Championship	1	0	2	1	0	0	—		—		3	1
Brighton & Hove Albion	2017–18	Premier League	0	0	0	0	1	0	—		—		1	0
Brighton & Hove Albion	Total		1	0	3	1	1	0	—		1	0	6	1
Brighton & Hove Albion U23	2016–17	—	—		—		—		—		2 (Note: Appearances in EFL Trophy)	2	2	2
Rotherham United (loan)	2017–18	League One	39	5	1	0	—		—		5 (Note: Two appearances, one goal in 2017–18 EFL Trophy; three appearances in 2017–18 EFL League One play-offs)	1	45	6
Rotherham United (loan)	2018–19	Championship	34	4	0	0	—		—		—		34	4
Rotherham United (loan)	Total		73	9	1	0	0	0	—		5	1	79	10
Salford City	2019–20	League Two	26	3	2	1	1	0	—		2	1	31	5
Salford City	2020–21	League Two	24	3	0	0	1	0	—		1	0	26	3
Salford City	Total		50	6	2	1	2	0	—		3	1	57	8
Shamrock Rovers	2021	LOI Premier Division	17	2	2	0	—		6 (Note: Two appearances, one goal in UEFA Champions League; four appearances in UEFA Europa Conference League)	1	—		25	3
Shamrock Rovers	2022	LOI Premier Division	28	2	1	0	—		11 (Note: Four appearances in UEFA Champions League, four appearances in UEFA Europa League)	0	1 (Note: Appearances in President of Ireland's Cup)	0	41	2
Shamrock Rovers	2023	LOI Premier Division	26	5	1	0	—		3 (Note: Two appearances in UEFA Champions League, one appearance in UEFA Europa Conference League)	0	1	0	31	5
Shamrock Rovers	2024	LOI Premier Division	14	1	1	0	—		4 (Note: One appearance in UEFA Champions League, two appearances in UEFA Europa League and one appearance in UEFA Conference League)	0	0	0	19	1
Shamrock Rovers	Total		85	10	5	0	—		24	1	2	0	116	11
Career total			336	69	25	8	8	1	30	3	23	7	422	88

== Honours ==
Dundalk

- League of Ireland Premier Division: 2014, 2015
- FAI Cup: 2015
- League of Ireland Cup: 2014
- President of Ireland's Cup: 2015
- Leinster Senior Cup: 2014–15

Rotherham United

- EFL League One play-offs: 2018

Salford City

- EFL Trophy: 2019–20

Shamrock Rovers

- League of Ireland Premier Division: 2021, 2022, 2023
- President of Ireland's Cup: 2022

Individual

- PFAI Players' Player of the Year: 2015
- FAI League Player of the Year: 2015
- PFAI Young Player of the Year: 2013
- PFAI Team of the Year: 2013, 2014, 2015
