= 2025–26 Chelsea F.C. season =

English football club season

Chelsea
2025–26 season
- Owner: BlueCo
- Chairman: Todd Boehly
- Head coach: Enzo Maresca (until 1 January 2026); Calum McFarlane (caretaker) (1–8 January 2026); Liam Rosenior (8 January – 22 April 2026); Calum McFarlane (interim) (from 22 April 2026)
- Stadium: Stamford Bridge
- Premier League: 10th
- FA Cup: Runners-up
- EFL Cup: Semi-finals
- UEFA Champions League: Round of 16
- Top goalscorer: League: João Pedro (15); All: João Pedro (20)
- Highest home attendance: 39,820 vs Arsenal, 30 November 2025, Premier League
- Lowest home attendance: 30,774 vs Pafos, 21 January 2026, Champions League
- Average home league attendance: 39,602
- Biggest win: 7–0 vs Port Vale (H), 4 April 2026, FA Cup
- Biggest defeat: 2–5 vs Paris Saint-Germain (A), 11 March 2026, Champions League; 0–3 vs Paris Saint-Germain (H), 17 March 2026, Champions League; 0–3 vs Everton (A), 21 March 2026, Premier League; 0–3 vs Manchester City (H), 12 April 2026, Premier League; 0–3 vs Brighton & Hove Albion (A), 21 April 2026, Premier League
Home colours	Away colours	Third colours

The 2025–26 season was the 120th season in the history of Chelsea Football Club, and their 34th consecutive season in Premier League as well as their 37th consecutive season in the English top flight. In addition to the domestic league, the club participated in the FA Cup, the EFL Cup and the UEFA Champions League, returning to the latter competition for the first time since the 2022–23 season.

== Kits ==
Home	Home alt. 1	Home alt. 2	Away	Away alt. 1	Away alt. 2	Away alt. 3	Third	Goalkeeper 1	Goalkeeper 2	Goalkeeper 3

== Management team ==
=== Enzo Maresca (until 1 January 2026) ===
Position	Staff
Head coach	(Italy) Enzo Maresca
Assistant coach	(Argentina) Willy Caballero
First team coach	(Italy) Roberto Vitiello
First team coach	(England) Danny Walker
Goalkeeper coach	(Italy) Michele De Bernardin
Goalkeeper coach	(Portugal) Hilário
Assistant goalkeeper coach	(England) James Russell
Fitness coach	(Spain) Marcos Alvarez
Technical analyst	(Mexico) Bernardo Cueva
Match analyst	(Spain) Javi Molina

Source: Chelsea F.C.

=== Liam Rosenior (8 January – 22 April 2026) ===
Position	Staff
Head coach	(England) Liam Rosenior
First team coaches	(Mali) Kalifa Cissé
First team coaches	(England) Calum McFarlane
First team coaches	(England) Justin Walker
Head of goalkeeping	(England) Ben Roberts
Assistant goalkeeper coach	(England) James Russell
First team analyst	(England) Ben Warner
Technical analyst	(Mexico) Bernardo Cueva

Source: Chelsea F.C.

=== Calum McFarlane (from 22 April 2026) ===
Position	Staff
Head coach	(England) Calum McFarlane
Head of goalkeeping	(England) Ben Roberts
Technical analyst	(Mexico) Bernardo Cueva
Under-21s head coach	(England) Harry Hudson
Under-18s head coach	(England) Dan Hogan

Source: Chelsea F.C.

== Squad information ==
Players and squad numbers last updated on 24 May 2026. Appearances include all competitions.

Note: Flags indicate national team as has been defined under FIFA eligibility rules. Players may hold more than one non-FIFA nationality.

=== First team ===
No.	Player	Nat.	Positions	Date of birth (age)	Place of birth	Signed in	Contract ends	Signed from	Transfer fee	Apps.	Goals
Goalkeepers
1	Robert Sánchez (HG, AT)	(Spain)	GK	18 November 1997 (aged 28)	(Spain) Cartagena	2023	2030	(England) Brighton & Hove Albion	£25m	111	0
12	Filip Jörgensen	(Denmark)	GK	16 April 2002 (aged 24)	(Sweden) Lomma	2024	2031	(Spain) Villarreal	£20.7m	36	0
28	Teddy Sharman-Lowe (HG, AT)	(England)	GK	30 March 2003 (aged 23)	(England) Leicester	2020	2028	(England) Burton Albion	Undisclosed	0	0
44	Gabriel Slonina (U21)	(United States)	GK	12 May 2004 (aged 22)	(United States) Addison	2022	2028	(United States) Chicago Fire	£8.1m	0	0
Defenders
3	Marc Cucurella	(Spain)	LB	22 July 1998 (aged 27)	(Spain) Alella	2022	2028	(England) Brighton & Hove Albion	£56m (Note: Initial £56 million plus £7 million in possible add-ons)	163	9
4	Tosin Adarabioyo (HG, AT)	(England)	CB	24 September 1997 (aged 28)	(England) Paddington	2024	2028	(England) Fulham	Free	70	7
5	Benoît Badiashile	(France)	CB	26 March 2001 (aged 25)	(France) Limoges	2023	2030	(France) Monaco	£35m	71	2
6	Levi Colwill (HG, CT)	(England)	CB	26 February 2003 (aged 23)	(England) Southampton	2021	2029	Academy		79	3
19	Mamadou Sarr (U21)	(Senegal)	CB	29 August 2005 (aged 20)	(France) Martigues	2025	2033	(France) Strasbourg	£11.8m	7	0
21	Jorrel Hato (U21)	(Netherlands)	LB	7 March 2006 (aged 20)	(Netherlands) Rotterdam	2025	2032	(Netherlands) Ajax	£35.5m (Note: Initial £35.5 million plus £3 million in possible add-ons)	36	2
23	Trevoh Chalobah (HG, CT)	(England)	CB	5 July 1999 (aged 26)	(Sierra Leone) Freetown	2018	2028	Academy		151	8
24	Reece James (captain) (HG, CT)	(England)	RB	8 December 1999 (aged 26)	(England) Redbridge	2018	2032	Academy		229	16
27	Malo Gusto	(France)	RB	19 May 2003 (aged 23)	(France) Décines-Charpieu	2023	2030	(France) Lyon	£26.3m (Note: Initial £26.3 million plus £4.4 million in possible add-ons)	134	3
29	Wesley Fofana	(France)	CB	17 December 2000 (aged 25)	(France) Marseille	2022	2029	(England) Leicester City	£70m	72	2
34	Josh Acheampong (U21, B)	(England)	RB / CB	5 May 2006 (aged 20)	(England) Waltham Forest	2024	2029	Academy		44	2
Midfielders
8	Enzo Fernández (vice-captain)	(Argentina)	CM / DM	17 January 2001 (aged 25)	(Argentina) San Martín	2023	2031	(Portugal) Benfica	£106.8m	169	31
10	Cole Palmer (HG, AT)	(England)	AM / RW	6 May 2002 (aged 24)	(England) Manchester	2023	2033	(England) Manchester City	£40m	131	54
14	Dário Essugo (U21)	(Portugal)	DM	14 March 2005 (aged 21)	(Portugal) Odivelas	2025	2033	(Portugal) Sporting CP	£18m	8	0
17	Andrey Santos (U21)	(Brazil)	CM	3 May 2004 (aged 22)	(Brazil) Rio de Janeiro	2023	2030	(Brazil) Vasco da Gama	£18m	47	3
25	Moisés Caicedo	(Ecuador)	DM	2 November 2001 (aged 24)	(Ecuador) Santo Domingo	2023	2033	(England) Brighton & Hove Albion	£100m (Note: Initial £100 million plus £15 million in possible add-ons)	148	8
45	Roméo Lavia (U21, B)	(Belgium)	DM	6 January 2004 (aged 22)	(Belgium) Brussels	2023	2030	(England) Southampton	£53m (Note: Initial £53 million plus £5 million in possible add-ons)	43	0
46	Reggie Walsh (U21, B)	(England)	CM	20 October 2008 (aged 17)	(England) London	2025	2026	Academy		4	0
Forwards
7	Pedro Neto	(Portugal)	RW / LW	9 March 2000 (aged 26)	(Portugal) Viana do Castelo	2024	2031	(England) Wolverhampton Wanderers	£51.3m (Note: Initial £51.3 million plus £2.6 million in possible add-ons)	103	19
9	Liam Delap (HG, AT)	(England)	ST	8 February 2003 (aged 23)	(England) Winchester	2025	2031	(England) Ipswich Town	£30m	47	3
11	Jamie Gittens (U21)	(England)	LW / RW	4 August 2004 (age 22)	(England) Reading	2025	2032	(Germany) Borussia Dortmund	£48.5m (Note: Initial £48.5 million plus £3.5 million in possible add-ons)	27	1
20	João Pedro (HG, AT)	(Brazil)	ST	26 September 2001 (aged 24)	(Brazil) Ribeirão Preto	2025	2033	(England) Brighton & Hove Albion	£55m (Note: Initial £55 million plus £5 million in possible add-ons)	53	23
38	Marc Guiu (U21)	(Spain)	ST	4 January 2006 (aged 20)	(Spain) Granollers	2024	2029	(Spain) Barcelona	£5m	29	8
41	Estêvão (U21)	(Brazil)	RW	24 April 2007 (aged 19)	(Brazil) Franca	2025	2033	(Brazil) Palmeiras	£29m (Note: Initial £29 million plus £20 million in possible add-ons)	36	8
49	Alejandro Garnacho (U21, AT)	(Argentina)	LW / RW	1 July 2004 (aged 21)	(Spain) Madrid	2025	2032	(England) Manchester United	£40m	43	8
55	Jesse Derry (U21, B)	(England)	LW	30 June 2007 (aged 19)	(England) Harrogate	2025	2029	Academy		3	0
62	Shim Mheuka (U21, B)	(England)	ST	20 October 2007 (aged 18)	(England) Birmingham	2024	2027	Academy		9	0
76	Ryan Kavuma-McQueen (U21, B)	(England)	LW	1 January 2009 (aged 17)	(England) London	2026	2028	Academy		1	0
	Mykhailo Mudryk	(Ukraine)	LW	5 January 2001 (aged 25)	(Ukraine) Berestyn	2023	2031	(Ukraine) Shakhtar Donetsk	£62m (Note: Initial £62 million plus £27 million in possible add-ons)	73	10

Notes:

- Player (HG) – Player who fulfills the Premier League's "Home Grown Player" criteria
- Player (U21) – Player who fulfills the Premier League's under-21 player criteria
- Player (CT) – Player who fulfills UEFA's "club-trained player" criteria
- Player (AT) – Player who fulfills UEFA's "association-trained player" criteria
- Player (B) – Player who fulfills UEFA's "List B" criteria

=== Out on loan ===
Player	Nat.	Positions	Date of birth (age)	Place of birth	Signed in	Contract ends	Signed from	Transfer fee	Apps.	Goals
Goalkeepers
Ted Curd (U21, B)	(England)	GK	14 February 2006 (aged 20)	(England) Kingston upon Thames	2023	2028	Academy		0	0
Mike Penders (U21)	(Belgium)	GK	31 July 2005 (aged 20)	(Belgium) Maasmechelen	2025	2032	(Belgium) Genk	£17m	0	0
Defenders
Aarón Anselmino (U21)	(Argentina)	CB	29 April 2005 (aged 21)	(Argentina) Bernardo Larroudé	2024	2031	(Argentina) Boca Juniors	£15.6m	1	0
Axel Disasi	(France)	CB	11 March 1998 (aged 28)	(France) Gonesse	2023	2029	(France) Monaco	£38.8M	61	5
Brodi Hughes (U21, B)	(England)	CB	16 October 2004 (aged 21)	(England) Winchester	2023	2026	Academy		0	0
Ishé Samuels-Smith (U21, AT)	(England)	LB	5 June 2006 (aged 20)	(England) Manchester	2025	2031	(France) Strasbourg	£6.5m	0	0
Joseph Wheeler-Henry (U21, CT)	(England)	RW	17 December 2007 (aged 18)	(England) Barnet	2026	2027	Academy		0	0
Midfielders
Omari Kellyman (U21, AT)	(England)	AM	15 September 2005 (aged 20)	(England) Derby	2024	2030	(England) Aston Villa	£19m	0	0
Kendry Páez (U21)	(Ecuador)	AM	4 May 2007 (age 19)	(Ecuador) Guayaquil	2025	2033	(Ecuador) Independiente del Valle	£17.2m	0	0
Frankie Runham (U21, CT)	(England)	RW	9 January 2007 (aged 19)	(England) Eastbourne	2026	2027	Academy		0	0
Forwards
David Datro Fofana	(Ivory Coast)	ST	22 December 2002 (aged 23)	(Ivory Coast) Ouragahio	2023	2029	(Norway) Molde	£8m	4	0
Tyrique George (U21, B)	(England)	LW / RW	4 February 2006 (aged 20)	(England) Camden	2024	2027	Academy		37	6
Nicolas Jackson	(Senegal)	ST / LW	20 June 2001 (aged 25)	(The Gambia) Banjul	2023	2033	(Spain) Villarreal	£32m	81	30
Jimmy-Jay Morgan (U21, AT)	(England)	ST	21 January 2006 (aged 20)	(England) Poole	2025	2027	Academy		0	0
Dujuan Richards (U21, B)	(Jamaica)	ST	10 November 2005 (aged 20)	(Jamaica) Port Royal	2026	2026	Academy		0	0
Ronnie Stutter (U21, B)	(England)	ST	6 January 2005 (aged 21)	(England) London	2024	2026	Academy		0	0

Notes:

- Player (HG) – Player who fulfills the Premier League's "Home Grown Player" criteria
- Player (U21) – Player who fulfills the Premier League's under-21 player criteria
- Player (CT) – Player who fulfills UEFA's "club-trained player" criteria
- Player (AT) – Player who fulfills UEFA's "association-trained player" criteria
- Player (B) – Player who fulfills UEFA's "List B" criteria

== New contracts ==
No.	Pos.	Player	Date	Until	Ref.
28	GK	(England) Teddy Sharman-Lowe	20 June 2025	30 June 2027	
51	RW	(England) Ato Ampah	18 July 2025	30 June 2028	
47	CB	(England) Harrison Murray-Campbell	20 August 2025	30 June 2027	
	CM	(England) Kiano Dyer	3 September 2025	30 June 2030	
38	RB	(Sweden) Genesis Antwi	18 September 2025	30 June 2028	
48	CM	(Scotland) Harrison McMahon	26 September 2025	30 June 2028	
53	RW	(England) Kobe Barbour	14 October 2025	30 June 2028	
46	CM	(England) Reggie Walsh	24 October 2025	Undisclosed (Note: First professional contract)	
90	GK	(England) Freddy Bernal	27 October 2025	30 June 2028	
	RW	(Northern Ireland) Christopher Atherton	29 October 2025	Undisclosed	
82	CB	(England) Lewi Richards	30 October 2025	Undisclosed	
79	CB	(Brazil) Isago Silva	1 December 2025	Undisclosed	
73	ST	(England) Chizaram Ezenwata	19 December 2025	Undisclosed	
76	RW	(England) Ryan Kavuma-McQueen	9 January 2026	Undisclosed	
66	CB	(England) Olutayo Subuloye	16 January 2026	30 June 2030	
81	AM	(Morocco) Ibrahim Rabbaj	20 January 2026	30 June 2028	
63	CB	(England) Kaiden Wilson	23 January 2026	30 June 2030	
	CB	(England) Jacob Hall	28 January 2026	Undisclosed	
72	AM	(England) Mathis Eboue	4 February 2026	Undisclosed	
	RB	(England) Riley Ebho	11 February 2026	Undisclosed	
56	LB	(England) Landon Emenalo	9 March 2026	30 June 2031	
50	GK	(England) Max Merrick	10 March 2026	30 June 2028	
24	RB	(England) Reece James	13 March 2026	30 June 2032	
25	DM	(Ecuador) Moisés Caicedo	17 April 2026	30 June 2033	
	CB	(England) Calvin Diakite	22 April 2026	Undisclosed	

== Transfers ==
=== In ===
==== Summer ====
Date	Pos.	Player	From	Fee	Ref.
First team
1 June 2025 (Note: Completed on 27 August 2024 and became official in Summer 2025)	GK	(Belgium) Mike Penders (Note: Transfer for 2025–26 season, but eligible to play in 2024–25 season for the 2025 FIFA Club World Cup)	(Belgium) Genk	£17,000,000	
2 June 2025	DM	(Portugal) Dário Essugo	(Portugal) Sporting CP	£18,000,000	
4 June 2025	ST	(England) Liam Delap	(England) Ipswich Town	£30,000,000	
9 June 2025	DF	(France) Mamadou Sarr	(France) Strasbourg	£11,800,000	
1 July 2025 (Note: Completed on 5 June 2023 and became official in Summer 2025, following Páez's 18th birthday)	AM	(Ecuador) Kendry Páez	(Ecuador) Independiente del Valle	£17,200,000	
2 July 2025	ST	(Brazil) João Pedro	(England) Brighton & Hove Albion	£55,000,000 (Note: Initial £55,000,000 plus £5,000,000 in possible add-ons)	
5 July 2025	LW	(England) Jamie Gittens	(Germany) Borussia Dortmund	£48,500,000 (Note: Initial £48,500,000 plus £3,500,000 in possible add-ons)	
3 August 2025	LB	(Netherlands) Jorrel Hato	(Netherlands) Ajax	£35,500,000 (Note: Initial £35,500,000 plus £3,000,000 in possible add-ons)	
5 August 2025 (Note: Completed on 22 June 2024 and became official in Summer 2025, following Estêvão's 18th birthday and the completion of 2025 FIFA Club World Cup)	RW	(Brazil) Estêvão	(Brazil) Palmeiras	£29,000,000 (Note: Initial £29,000,000 plus £20,000,000 in possible add-ons)	
30 August 2025	LW	(Argentina) Alejandro Garnacho	(England) Manchester United	£40,000,000	
1 September 2025	LB	(England) Ishé Samuels-Smith	(France) Strasbourg	£6,500,000	
Academy
3 July 2025	RW	(Northern Ireland) Christopher Atherton	(Northern Ireland) Glenavon	Undisclosed	
4 July 2025	LB	(England) Kian Best	(England) Preston North End	Free	
31 July 2025	RW	(England) Jesse Derry	(England) Crystal Palace	Undisclosed	
13 October 2025	RB	(England) Riley Ebho	(England) West Ham United	Undisclosed	
13 October 2025	ST	(England) Jashayde Greenwood	(England) Wolverhampton Wanderers	Undisclosed	
13 October 2025	CB	(Republic of Ireland) Justin Osagie	(England) Peterborough United	Free	

==== Winter ====
Date	Pos.	Player	From	Fee	Ref.
First team
28 February 2026	GK	(England) James Hillson	(England) Wealdstone	Free	
Academy
26 January 2026	LB	(England) Yisa Alao	(England) Sheffield Wednesday	£500,000	

=== Out ===
==== Summer ====
Date	Pos.	Player	To	Fee	Ref.
First team
10 June 2025	GK	(England) Marcus Bettinelli (Note: Transfer for 2025–26 season, but eligible to play for the new club in 2024–25 season for the 2025 FIFA Club World Cup)	(England) Manchester City	£2,085,000	
1 July 2025	GK	(Spain) Kepa Arrizabalaga	(England) Arsenal	£5,000,000	
1 July 2025	GK	(Finland) Lucas Bergström	(Spain) Mallorca (Note: Released on 1 July 2025, Bergström joined Mallorca on 15 July 2025)	Free	
1 July 2025	LB	(England) Bashir Humphreys	(England) Burnley	£14,000,000	
12 July 2025	CM	(France) Mathis Amougou	(France) Strasbourg	£12,000,000	
16 July 2025	GK	(Serbia) Đorđe Petrović	(England) Bournemouth	£25,000,000	
18 July 2025	RW	(England) Noni Madueke	(England) Arsenal	£48,500,000 (Note: Initial £48,500,000 plus £3,500,000 in possible add-ons)	
29 July 2025	LW	(Portugal) João Félix	(Saudi Arabia) Al-Nassr	£26,200,000 (Note: Initial £26,200,000 plus £17,500,000 in possible add-ons)	
6 August 2025	CM	(England) Kiernan Dewsbury-Hall	(England) Everton	£25,000,000 (Note: Initial £25,000,000 plus £4,000,000 in possible add-ons)	
6 August 2025	DM	(France) Lesley Ugochukwu	(England) Burnley	£23,200,000	
8 August 2025	ST	(Albania) Armando Broja	(England) Burnley	£20,000,000	
22 August 2025	LB	(Portugal) Renato Veiga	(Spain) Villarreal	£26,000,000	
26 August 2025	CM	(Austria) Carney Chukwuemeka	(Germany) Borussia Dortmund	£24,000,000	
29 August 2025	RB	(England) Alfie Gilchrist	(England) West Bromwich Albion	£1,200,000 (Note: Initial £1,200,000 plus £800,000 in possible add-ons)	
30 August 2025	CF	(France) Christopher Nkunku	(Italy) Milan	£32,000,000 (Note: Initial £32,000,000 plus £4,000,000 in possible add-ons)	
1 September 2025	LB	(England) Ben Chilwell	(France) Strasbourg	Free	
Academy
1 July 2025	GK	(Wales) Eddie Beach	(Scotland) Kilmarnock (Note: Released on 1 July 2025, Beach joined Kilmarnock on 11 July 2025)	Free	
1 July 2025	GK	(England) Luke Campbell	(England) Nottingham Forest (Note: Released on 1 July 2025, Campell joined Nottingham Forest on 4 July 2025)	Free	
1 July 2025	ST	(England) Donnell McNeilly	(England) Nottingham Forest (Note: Released on 1 July 2025, McNeilly joined Nottingham Forest on 1 September 2025)	Free	
1 July 2025	CM	(England) Walter Nutter	(England) Southampton (Note: Released on 1 July 2025, Nutter joined Southampton on 15 August 2025)	Free	
1 July 2025	RB	(England) Harry Rodda	(England) Southampton	Free	
1 July 2025	LB	(England) Marcell Washington	(England) Arsenal (Note: Released on 1 July 2025, Washington joined Arsenal on 12 July 2025)	Free	
1 July 2025	LB	(England) Dylan Williams	(England) Burton Albion	Undisclosed	
14 July 2025	LB	(England) Zak Sturge	(England) Millwall	Undisclosed	
30 July 2025	LB	(England) Ishé Samuels-Smith	(France) Strasbourg	£6,500,000	
1 September 2025	CM	(England) Alex Matos	(England) Sheffield United	Undisclosed	

==== Winter ====
Date	Pos.	Player	To	Fee	Ref.
First team
28 January 2026	LW	(England) Raheem Sterling	(Netherlands) Feyenoord (Note: Released on 28 January 2026, Sterling joined Feyenoord on 12 February 2026)	Free	
Academy
9 January 2026	AM	(England) Leo Castledine	(England) Middlesbrough	£1,000,000	
2 February 2026	RW	(England) Ato Ampah	(England) Stoke City	£3,000,000	
2 February 2026	LB	(England) Harry McGlinchey	(England) Sheffield United	Undisclosed	
2 February 2026	RW	(England) Joel Philbert	(England) Tottenham Hotspur	Undisclosed	
2 February 2026	AM	(Morocco) Yahya Idrissi	(Italy) Milan	Undisclosed	

=== Loaned in ===
==== Summer ====
Date	Pos.	Player	To	Date until	Fee	Ref.
First team
1 September 2025	AM	(Argentina) Facundo Buonanotte	(England) Brighton & Hove Albion	15 January 2026 (Note: On 15 January 2026, Buonanotte was recalled by Brighton & Hove Albion from his initial season-long loan)	£2,000,000	

=== Loaned out ===
==== Summer ====
Date	Pos.	Player	To	Date until	Fee	Ref.
First team
22 July 2025	LB	(United States) Caleb Wiley	(England) Watford	9 January 2026 (Note: On 9 January 2026, Wiley was recalled from his initial season-long loan at Watford)	Free	
28 July 2025	GK	(Belgium) Mike Penders	(France) Strasbourg	30 June 2026	Free	
31 July 2025	AM	(Ecuador) Kendry Páez	(France) Strasbourg	30 January 2026 (Note: On 30 January 2026, Páez was recalled from his initial season-long loan at Strasbourg)	Free	
1 August 2025	CB	(France) Mamadou Sarr	(France) Strasbourg	2 February 2026 (Note: On 2 February 2026, Sarr was recalled from his initial season-long loan at Strasbourg)	Free	
6 August 2025	ST	(Spain) Marc Guiu	(England) Sunderland	1 September 2025 (Note: On 1 September 2025, Guiu was recalled from his initial season-long loan at Sunderland)	Free	
27 August 2025	CB	(Argentina) Aarón Anselmino	(Germany) Borussia Dortmund	26 January 2026 (Note: On 26 January 2025, Anselmino was recalled from his initial season-long loan at Borussia Dortmund)	Free	
1 September 2025	ST	(Senegal) Nicolas Jackson	(Germany) Bayern Munich	30 June 2026	£14,300,000	
13 September 2025	ST	(Ivory Coast) David Datro Fofana	(Turkey) Fatih Karagümrük	21 January 2026 (Note: On 21 January 2026, Fofana was recalled from his initial season-long loan at Fatih Karagümrük)	Free	
Academy
20 June 2025	GK	(England) Teddy Sharman-Lowe	(England) Bolton Wanderers	14 January 2026 (Note: On 14 January 2026, Sharman-Lowe was recalled from his initial season-long loan at Bolton Wanderers)	Free	
1 August 2025	AM	(England) Leo Castledine	(England) Huddersfield Town	9 January 2026 (Note: On 9 January 2026, Castledine was recalled from his initial season-long loan at Huddersfield Town)	Free	
29 August 2025	RB	(England) Brodi Hughes	(England) AFC Wimbledon	30 June 2026	Free	
1 September 2025	AM	(England) Omari Kellyman	(Wales) Cardiff City	30 June 2026	Free	
1 September 2025	ST	(England) Jimmy-Jay Morgan	(England) Peterborough United	30 June 2026	Free	
1 September 2025	LB	(England) Ishé Samuels-Smith	(Wales) Swansea City	30 June 2026	Free	
1 September 2025	ST	(England) Ronnie Stutter	(England) Barnet	30 June 2026	Free	
3 September 2025	CM	(England) Kiano Dyer	(Netherlands) Volendam	4 January 2026 (Note: On 4 January 2026, Dyer was recalled from his initial season-long loan at Volendam)	Free	
20 September 2025	LW	(England) Jeremiah Berkeley-Agyepong	(England) Ipswich Town	1 January 2026	Free	

==== Winter ====
Date	Pos.	Player	To	Date until	Fee	Ref
First team
30 January 2026	AM	(Ecuador) Kendry Páez	(Argentina) River Plate	31 December 2026	Free	
2 February 2026	CB	(Argentina) Aarón Anselmino	(France) Strasbourg	30 June 2026	Free	
2 February 2026	CB	(France) Axel Disasi	(England) West Ham United	30 June 2026	£1,700,000	
2 February 2026	RW	(England) Tyrique George	(England) Everton	30 June 2026	Free	
2 February 2026	ST	(Ivory Coast) David Datro Fofana	(France) Strasbourg	30 June 2026	Free	
Academy
12 November 2025	GK	(England) Ted Curd	(England) Boreham Wood	30 June 2026	Free	
2 February 2026	ST	(Jamaica) Dujuan Richards	(England) Leicester City	30 June 2026	Free	
2 February 2026	RW	(England) Frankie Runham	(England) Ipswich Town	30 June 2026	Free	
2 February 2026	RB	(England) Joseph Wheeler-Henry	(England) Brentford	30 June 2026	Free	

=== Overall transfer activity ===
==== Expenditure ====
Summer: ▼£310,500,000

Winter: ▼£500,000

Total: ▼£311,000,000

==== Income ====
Summer: ▲£304,985,000

Winter: ▲£5,700,000

Total: ▲£310,685,000

==== Net totals ====
Summer: ▼£5,515,000

Winter: ▲£5,200,000

Total: ▼£315,000

== Pre-season and friendlies ==
On 17 June 2025, Chelsea announced that they would host a pre-season tournament playing against Bayer Leverkusen and Milan at Stamford Bridge.

Win Draw Loss Fixtures

8 August 2025 VisitMalta Weekender	Chelsea	2–0	Bayer Leverkusen	Fulham
19:00 BST	Chalobah (yellow card) 13'; Estêvão 18'; João Pedro 90'	Report	Andrich (yellow card) 7'; Quansah (yellow card) 26'	Stadium: Stamford Bridge; Attendance: 30,000; Referee: Stuart Attwell (England)

10 August 2025 VisitMalta Weekender	Chelsea	4–1	Milan	Fulham
15:00 BST	Coubiș 5' (o.g.); João Pedro 8'; Delap 67' (pen.), 90'	Report	Coubiș (red card) 18'; Maignan (yellow card) 66'; Fofana 70'	Stadium: Stamford Bridge; Attendance: 37,000; Referee: Michael Salisbury (England)

== Competitions ==
=== Overall record ===
Competition	First match	Last match	Starting round	Final position	Record							
Competition	First match	Last match	Starting round	Final position	Pld	W	D	L	GF	GA	GD	Win %
Premier League	17 August 2025	24 May 2026	Matchday 1	10th	38	14	10	14	58	52	+6	36.84
FA Cup	10 January 2026	16 May 2026	Third round	Runners-up	6	5	0	1	21	4	+17	83.33
EFL Cup	23 September 2025	3 February 2026	Third round	Semi-finals	5	3	0	2	11	9	+2	60.00
UEFA Champions League	17 September 2025	17 March 2026	League phase	Round of 16	10	5	1	4	19	18	+1	50.00
Total					59	27	11	21	109	83	+26	45.76

Source: Soccerway

=== Premier League ===
==== League table ====
Pos	Team	Pld	W	D	L	GF	GA	GD	Pts	Qualification or relegation
8	Brighton & Hove Albion	38	14	11	13	52	46	+6	53	Qualification for the Conference League play-off round (Note: Since the winners of the 2025–26 FA Cup and 2025–26 EFL Cup, Manchester City, qualified for the Champions League by league position, the spot reserved for the FA Cup winners (Europa League league phase) was passed to the seventh-placed team, and the spot reserved for the EFL Cup winners (Conference League play-off round) was passed to the eighth-placed team.)
9	Brentford	38	14	11	13	55	52	+3	53	
10	Chelsea	38	14	10	14	58	52	+6	52	
11	Fulham	38	15	7	16	47	51	−4	52	
12	Newcastle United	38	14	7	17	53	55	−2	49	

Source: Premier League
Rules for classification: 1) Points; 2) Goal difference; 3) Goals scored; 4) If the champions, relegated teams or qualified teams for UEFA competitions cannot be determined by rules 1 to 3, rules 4.1 to 4.3 are applied – 4.1) Points gained in head-to-head record between such teams; 4.2) Away goals scored in head-to-head record between such teams; 4.3) Play-offs

==== Results summary ====
Overall								Home						Away					
Pld	W	D	L	GF	GA	GD	Pts	W	D	L	GF	GA	GD	W	D	L	GF	GA	GD
38	14	10	14	58	52	+6	52	7	5	7	26	25	+1	7	5	7	32	27	+5

Source: Soccerway

==== Results by round ====
Round	1	2	3	4	5	6	7	8	9	10	11	12	13	14	15	16	17	18	19	20	21	22	23	24	25	26	27	28	29	30	31	32	33	34	35	36	37	38
Ground	H	A	H	A	A	H	H	A	H	A	H	A	H	A	A	H	A	H	H	A	A	H	A	H	A	H	H	A	A	H	A	H	H	A	H	A	H	A
Result	D	W	W	D	L	L	W	W	L	W	W	W	D	L	D	W	D	L	D	D	L	W	W	W	W	D	D	L	W	L	L	L	L	L	L	D	W	L
Position	11	4	2	5	6	8	7	5	9	7	3	2	3	4	5	4	4	5	5	5	8	6	5	5	5	5	5	6	5	6	6	6	6	8	9	9	8	10
Points	1	4	7	8	8	8	11	14	14	17	20	23	24	24	25	28	29	29	30	31	31	34	37	40	43	44	45	45	48	48	48	48	48	48	48	49	52	52

Source: Soccerway
A = Away; H = Home; W = Win; D = Draw; L = Loss; P = Postponed

==== Score overview ====
Win Draw Loss

Opposition	Home score	Away score	Aggregate score	Double
Arsenal	1–1	1–2	2–3	No
Aston Villa	1–2	4–1	5–3	No
Bournemouth	2–2	0–0	2–2	No
Brentford	2–0	2–2	4–2	No
Brighton & Hove Albion	1–3	0–3	1–6	No
Burnley	1–1	2–0	3–1	No
Crystal Palace	0–0	3–1	3–1	No
Everton	2–0	0–3	2–3	No
Fulham	2–0	1–2	3–2	No
Leeds United	2–2	1–3	3–5	No
Liverpool	2–1	1–1	3–2	No
Manchester City	0–3	1–1	1–4	No
Manchester United	0–1	1–2	1–3	No
Newcastle United	0–1	2–2	2–3	No
Nottingham Forest	1–3	3–0	4–3	No
Sunderland	1–2	1–2	2–4	No
Tottenham Hotspur	2–1	1–0	3–1	Yes
West Ham United	3–2	5–1	8–3	Yes
Wolverhampton Wanderers	3–0	3–1	6–1	Yes

==== Matches ====
The league fixtures were announced on 18 June 2025.

Win Draw Loss Fixtures

17 August 2025 1	Chelsea	0–0	Crystal Palace	Fulham
14:00 BST	James (yellow card) 24'; Estêvão (yellow card) 74'	Report	Muñoz (yellow card) 28'; Mateta (yellow card) 33'; Hughes (yellow card) 49'	Stadium: Stamford Bridge; Attendance: 39,678; Referee: Darren England

22 August 2025 2	West Ham United	1–5	Chelsea	Stratford
20:00 BST	Paquetá 6'	Report	João Pedro 15'; Neto 23'; Fernández 34'; Caicedo 54'; Chalobah 58'; Hato (yellow card) 87'	Stadium: London Stadium; Attendance: 62,462; Referee: Michael Oliver
Note: Fixture was originally scheduled for 23 August, but was moved for live Sky Sports broadcasting.

30 August 2025 3	Chelsea	2–0	Fulham	Fulham
12:30 BST	Caicedo (yellow card) 38'; João Pedro 45+9'; Fernández 56' (pen.); Andrey Santos (yellow card) 90+3'	Report	Iwobi (yellow card) 73'; Lukić (yellow card) 90+6'	Stadium: Stamford Bridge; Attendance: 39,745; Referee: Robert Jones
Note: Fixture was originally scheduled for a 15:00 kick-off, but was moved for live TNT Sports broadcasting.

13 September 2025 4	Brentford	2–2	Chelsea	Brentford
20:00 BST	Thiago (yellow card) 8'; Schade 35'; Yarmolyuk (yellow card) 64'; Pinnock (yellow card) 82'; Carvalho 90+3'	Report	Hato (yellow card) 30'; Palmer 61'; Caicedo 85'; George (yellow card) 90+1'	Stadium: Gtech Community Stadium; Attendance: 16,795; Referee: Stuart Attwell
Note: Fixture was originally scheduled for a 15:00 kick-off, but was moved for live Sky Sports broadcasting.

20 September 2025 5	Manchester United	2–1	Chelsea	Trafford
17:30 BST	Fernandes 14'; Casemiro (yellow card) 17' (yellow-red card) 45+5', (goal) 37'	Report	Sánchez (red card) 5'; Cucurella (yellow card) 44'; Fernández (yellow card) 48'; Chalobah (yellow card) 50', (goal) 80'; George (yellow card) 72'; Adarabioyo (yellow card) 90+6'	Stadium: Old Trafford; Attendance: 74,124; Referee: Peter Bankes
Note: Fixture was initially scheduled for a 15:00 kick-off, but was moved for live Sky Sports broadcast.

27 September 2025 6	Chelsea	1–3	Brighton & Hove Albion	Fulham
15:00 BST	Fernández 24'; Cucurella (yellow card) 42'; Chalobah (red card) 53'; James (yellow card) 66'; Badiashile (yellow card) 89'; Sánchez (yellow card) 90'	Report	Veltman (yellow card) 9'; Wieffer (yellow card) 64'; Welbeck 77', 90+10', (yellow card) 90+11'; Van Hecke (yellow card) 89'; Dunk (yellow card) 90'; De Cuyper 90+2'	Stadium: Stamford Bridge; Attendance: 39,597; Referee: Simon Hooper

4 October 2025 7	Chelsea	2–1	Liverpool	Fulham
17:30 BST	Caicedo 14'; Estêvão 90+5'; Maresca (yellow card) 40' (yellow-red card) 90+7'	Report	Bradley (yellow card) 34'; Gakpo 63'; Szoboszlai (yellow card) 79'; Slot (yellow card) 82'	Stadium: Stamford Bridge; Attendance: 39,769; Referee: Anthony Taylor
Note: Fixture was originally scheduled for a 15:00 kick-off, but was moved for live Sky Sports broadcasting.

18 October 2025 8	Nottingham Forest	0–3	Chelsea	West Bridgford
12:30 BST	Morato (yellow card) 41'; Sangaré (yellow card) 80'	Report	Acheampong 49'; Neto 52'; Gusto (yellow card) 54' (yellow-red card) 87'; James 84'; Estêvão (yellow card) 89'; Sánchez (yellow card) 90+4'	Stadium: City Ground; Attendance: 30,495; Referee: Chris Kavanagh
Note: Fixture was originally scheduled for a 15:00 kick-off, but was moved for live TNT Sports broadcasting.

25 October 2025 9	Chelsea	1–2	Sunderland	Fulham
15:00 BST	Garnacho 4'; Andrey Santos (yellow card) 88'	Report	Isidor 22'; Le Fée (yellow card) 69'; Talbi 90+3'	Stadium: Stamford Bridge; Attendance: 39,489; Referee: Andrew Madley

1 November 2025 10	Tottenham Hotspur	0–1	Chelsea	Tottenham
17:30 GMT	Bentancur (yellow card) 45+3'; Danso (yellow card) 47'; Simons (yellow card) 59'; Kudus (yellow card) 74'	Report	João Pedro 34'; Chalobah (yellow card) 45+3'; Fernández (yellow card) 68'	Stadium: Tottenham Hotspur Stadium; Attendance: 61,202; Referee: Jarred Gillett
Note: Fixture was originally scheduled for a 15:00 kick-off, but was moved for live Sky Sports broadcasting.

8 November 2025 11	Chelsea	3–0	Wolverhampton Wanderers	Fulham
20:00 GMT	Gusto 51'; Caicedo (yellow card) 60'; João Pedro 65'; Neto 73'	Report	André (yellow card) 49'; Munetsi (yellow card) 79'	Stadium: Stamford Bridge; Attendance: 39,467; Referee: Andrew Kitchen
Note: Fixture was originally scheduled for a 15:00 kick-off, but was moved for live Sky Sports broadcasting.

22 November 2025 12	Burnley	0–2	Chelsea	Burnley
12:30 GMT	Walker (yellow card) 49'; Mejbri (yellow card) 82'	Report	Neto 37', (yellow card) 41'; João Pedro (yellow card) 69'; Badiashile (yellow card) 81'; Fernández 88'	Stadium: Turf Moor; Attendance: 21,499; Referee: Peter Bankes
Note: Fixture was originally scheduled for a 15:00 kick-off, but was moved for live TNT Sports broadcasting.

30 November 2025 13	Chelsea	1–1	Arsenal	Fulham
16:30 GMT	Cucurella (yellow card) 11'; Caicedo (red card) 38'; Chalobah 48'	Report	Zubimendi (yellow card) 5'; Mosquera (yellow card) 13'; Calafiori (yellow card) 27'; Hincapié (yellow card) 41'; Lewis-Skelly (yellow card) 54'; Merino 59'; Gyökeres (yellow card) 88'	Stadium: Stamford Bridge; Attendance: 39,820; Referee: Anthony Taylor
Note: Fixture was originally scheduled for 29 November, but was moved for live Sky Sports broadcasting.

3 December 2025 14	Leeds United	3–1	Chelsea	Leeds
20:15 GMT	Bijol 6'; Stach (yellow card) 35'; Tanaka 43'; Calvert-Lewin 72'	Report	Estêvão (yellow card) 39'; Neto 50'	Stadium: Elland Road; Attendance: 36,767; Referee: Darren England
Note: Fixture was originally scheduled for a 15:00 kick-off, but was moved for live Sky Sports broadcasting.

6 December 2025 15	Bournemouth	0–0	Chelsea	Bournemouth
15:00 GMT		Report	Guiu (yellow card) 85'; Neto (yellow card) 90+1'	Stadium: Dean Court; Attendance: 11,240; Referee: Michael Oliver

13 December 2025 16	Chelsea	2–0	Everton	Fulham
15:00 GMT	Palmer 21'; Gusto 45'; Fofana (yellow card) 76'	Report		Stadium: Stamford Bridge; Attendance: 39,552; Referee: Thomas Bramall

20 December 2025 17	Newcastle United	2–2	Chelsea	Newcastle upon Tyne
12:30 GMT	Woltemade 4', 20'; Schär (yellow card) 61'; Wissa (yellow card) 77'; Hall (yellow card) 86'	Report	Sánchez (yellow card) 7'; Garnacho (yellow card) 27'; Gusto (yellow card) 45'; James 49'; João Pedro 66', (yellow card) 83'; Caicedo (yellow card) 70'; Andrey Santos (yellow card) 82'	Stadium: St James' Park; Attendance: 52,226; Referee: Andrew Madley
Note: Fixture was originally scheduled for a 15:00 kick-off, but was moved for live TNT Sports broadcasting.

27 December 2025 18	Chelsea	1–2	Aston Villa	Fulham
17:30 GMT	João Pedro 37'; James (yellow card) 57'; Chalobah (yellow card) 68'; Caicedo (yellow card) 71'; Delap (yellow card) 71'; Fernández (yellow card) 90+4'	Report	Cash (yellow card) 30'; Rogers (yellow card) 57'; Watkins 63', 84'; Kamara (yellow card) 78'	Stadium: Stamford Bridge; Attendance: 39,765; Referee: Stuart Attwell
Note: Fixture was originally scheduled for a 15:00 kick-off, but was moved for live Sky Sports broadcasting.

30 December 2025 19	Chelsea	2–2	Bournemouth	Fulham
19:30 GMT	Caicedo (yellow card) 4'; Palmer 15' (pen.); Fernández 23'	Report	Brooks 6'; Kluivert 27'; Tavernier (yellow card) 84'	Stadium: Stamford Bridge; Attendance: 39,622; Referee: Sam Barrott
Note: Fixture was originally scheduled for a 15:00 kick-off, but was moved for live Sky Sports broadcasting.

4 January 2026 20	Manchester City	1–1	Chelsea	Manchester
17:30 GMT	Reijnders 42'; Dias (yellow card) 54'; Nunes (yellow card) 79'; Silva (yellow card) 90+3'	Report	James (yellow card) 52'; Delap (yellow card) 79'; Fernández 90+4', (yellow card) 90+5'	Stadium: Etihad Stadium; Attendance: 52,503; Referee: Michael Oliver
Note: Fixture was originally scheduled for 3 January, but was moved for live Sky Sports broadcasting.

7 January 2026 21	Fulham	2–1	Chelsea	Fulham
19:30 GMT	Cuenca (yellow card) 45+7'; Jiménez 55', (yellow card) 90'; Castagne (yellow card) 78'; Wilson 81'	Report	Cucurella (red card) 22'; Fernández (yellow card) 24'; Adarabioyo (yellow card) 25'; Palmer (yellow card) 25'; Delap 72'	Stadium: Craven Cottage; Attendance: 26,990; Referee: Peter Bankes
Note: Fixture was originally scheduled for a 15:00 kick-off, but was moved for live Sky Sports broadcasting.

17 January 2026 22	Chelsea	2–0	Brentford	Fulham
15:00 GMT	João Pedro 26'; Cucurella (yellow card) 67'; Palmer 76' (pen.), (yellow card) 90+1'; Fofana (yellow card) 83'	Report	Schade (yellow card) 36'; Janelt (yellow card) 45+3'	Stadium: Stamford Bridge; Attendance: 39,704; Referee: John Brooks

25 January 2026 23	Crystal Palace	1–3	Chelsea	Selhurst
14:00 GMT	Canvot (yellow card) 63'; Wharton (yellow card) 67' (yellow-red card) 72'; Richards 88'; Lerma (yellow card) 90'	Report	Caicedo (yellow card) 20'; Estêvão 34'; João Pedro 50'; Fernández 64' (pen.); Andrey Santos (yellow card) 90'	Stadium: Selhurst Park; Attendance: 25,163; Referee: Darren England
Note: Fixture was initially scheduled for 24 January, but was rescheduled for live Sky Sports broadcasting.

31 January 2026 24	Chelsea	3–2	West Ham United	Fulham
17:30 GMT	João Pedro 57', (yellow card) 90+7'; Cucurella 70'; Caicedo (yellow card) 85'; Fernández 90+2', (yellow card) 90+3'	Report	Bowen 7'; Summerville 36'; Scarles (yellow card) 90+4'; Traoré (yellow card) 90+7'; Todibo (red card) 90+11'	Stadium: Stamford Bridge; Attendance: 39,430; Referee: Anthony Taylor
Note: Fixture was initially scheduled for a 15:00 kick-off, but was rescheduled for live Sky Sports broadcasting.

7 February 2026 25	Wolverhampton Wanderers	1–3	Chelsea	Wolverhampton
15:00 GMT	Armstrong (yellow card) 45+4'; Arokodare 54'	Report	Palmer 13' (pen.), 35' (pen.), 38'; Cucurella (yellow card) 73'	Stadium: Molineux Stadium; Attendance: 29,762; Referee: Jarred Gillett

10 February 2026 26	Chelsea	2–2	Leeds United	Fulham
19:30 GMT	Gusto (yellow card) 8'; Acheampong (yellow card) 15'; João Pedro 24'; Palmer 58' (pen.), (yellow card) 67'; Caicedo (yellow card) 90+8'	Report	Gudmundsson (yellow card) 19'; Bornauw (yellow card) 22'; Justin (yellow card) 45'; Nmecha 67' (pen.); Okafor 73'; Longstaff (yellow card) 90+6'	Stadium: Stamford Bridge; Attendance: 39,253; Referee: Robert Jones
Note: Fixture was initially scheduled for a 20:00 kick-off, but was rescheduled for live TNT Sports broadcasting.

21 February 2026 27	Chelsea	1–1	Burnley	Fulham
15:00 GMT	João Pedro 4'; Fofana (yellow card) 34' (yellow-red card) 72'; Sánchez (yellow card) 90'; Hato (yellow card) 90+4'	Report	Mejbri (yellow card) 30'; Flemming 90+3'; Laurent (yellow card) 90+3'	Stadium: Stamford Bridge; Attendance: 39,603; Referee: Lewis Smith

1 March 2026 28	Arsenal	2–1	Chelsea	Holloway
16:30 GMT	Saliba 21'; Timber 66'; Gabriel (yellow card) 75'	Report	Hincapié 45+2' (o.g.); Palmer (yellow card) 59'; Hato (yellow card) 65'; Neto (yellow card) 67' (yellow-red card) 70'; Fernández (yellow card) 79'	Stadium: Emirates Stadium; Attendance: 60,296; Referee: Darren England
Note: Fixture was initially scheduled for 28 February, but was rescheduled for live Sky Sports broadcasting.

4 March 2026 29	Aston Villa	1–4	Chelsea	Birmingham
19:30 GMT	Douglas Luiz 2'; Cash (yellow card) 32'; Rogers (yellow card) 58'; Watkins (yellow card) 68'	Report	João Pedro 35', 45+6', 64', (yellow card) 54'; Palmer 55'; Fernández (yellow card) 58'	Stadium: Villa Park; Attendance: 42,084; Referee: Jarred Gillett
Note: Fixture was originally scheduled for a 20:00 kick-off, but was moved for live TNT Sports broadcasting.

14 March 2026 30	Chelsea	0–1	Newcastle United	Fulham
17:30 GMT	Fofana (yellow card) 23'; Caicedo (yellow card) 25'	Report	Gordon 18'; Ramsdale (yellow card) 84'; Hall (yellow card) 89'	Stadium: Stamford Bridge; Attendance: 39,587; Referee: Paul Tierney
Note: Fixture was initially scheduled for a 15:00 kick-off, but was rescheduled for live Sky Sports broadcasting.

21 March 2026 31	Everton	3–0	Chelsea	Liverpool
17:30 GMT	Beto 33', 62'; Ndiaye 76'	Report	Garnacho (yellow card) 69'; Fofana (yellow card) 87'	Stadium: Hill Dickinson Stadium; Attendance: 52,547; Referee: Sam Barrott
Note: Fixture was initially scheduled for a 15:00 kick-off, but was rescheduled for live Sky Sports broadcasting.

12 April 2026 32	Chelsea	0–3	Manchester City	Fulham
16:30 BST	Estêvão (yellow card) 12'; Cucurella (yellow card) 54'; Essugo (yellow card) 90+8'	Report	Semenyo (yellow card) 38'; O'Reilly 51'; Guéhi 57'; Doku 68'	Stadium: Stamford Bridge; Attendance: 39,552; Referee: Chris Kavanagh
Note: Fixture was originally scheduled for 11 April, but was moved for live Sky Sports broadcasting.

18 April 2026 33	Chelsea	0–1	Manchester United	Fulham
20:00 BST	Hato (yellow card) 39'	Report	Cunha (yellow card) 25', (goal) 43'; Mount (yellow card) 90+1'; Mainoo (yellow card) 90+4'	Stadium: Stamford Bridge; Attendance: 39,733; Referee: Michael Oliver
Note: Fixture was initially scheduled for a 15:00 kick-off, but was rescheduled for live TNT Sports broadcasting.

21 April 2026 34	Brighton & Hove Albion	3–0	Chelsea	Brighton and Hove
20:00 BST	Kadıoğlu 3'; Hinshelwood 56'; Minteh (yellow card) 58'; Welbeck 90+1'	Report	Fofana (yellow card) 45+1'	Stadium: American Express Stadium; Attendance: 31,220; Referee: Craig Pawson
Note: Fixture was originally scheduled for 26 April, but was rescheduled due to Chelsea's participation in the FA Cup semi-finals.

4 May 2026 35	Chelsea	1–3	Nottingham Forest	Fulham
15:00 BST	Gusto (yellow card) 14'; Palmer (penalty missed) 45+10'; Caicedo (yellow card) 78'; Delap (yellow card) 78'; João Pedro 90+3'	Report	Awoniyi 2', 52'; Morato (yellow card) 10'; Igor Jesus 15' (pen.)	Stadium: Stamford Bridge; Attendance: 39,605; Referee: Anthony Taylor
Note: Fixture was originally scheduled for 2 May, but was moved for live Sky Sports broadcasting.

9 May 2026 36	Liverpool	1–1	Chelsea	Liverpool
12:30 BST	Gravenberch 6'; Gomez (yellow card) 88'; Mac Allister (yellow card) 90+4'	Report	Fernández 35', (yellow card) 73'; Hato (yellow card) 67'; Cucurella (yellow card) 83'; Caicedo (yellow card) 89'	Stadium: Anfield; Attendance: 60,429; Referee: Craig Pawson
Note: Fixture was originally scheduled for a 15:00 kick-off, but was brought forward for live Sky Sports broadcasting.

19 May 2026 37	Chelsea	2–1	Tottenham Hotspur	Fulham
20:15 BST	Fernández 18'; Andrey Santos 67'; Hato (yellow card) 79'; Cucurella (yellow card) 85'; Delap (yellow card) 87'; Essugo (yellow card) 90+2'	Report	Porro (yellow card) 28'; Van de Ven (yellow card) 43'; Udogie (yellow card) 63'; Richarlison 74'	Stadium: Stamford Bridge; Attendance: 39,463; Referee: Stuart Attwell
Note: Fixture was originally scheduled for 17 May, but was rescheduled due to Chelsea's participation in the FA Cup final.

24 May 2026 38	Sunderland	2–1	Chelsea	Sunderland
16:00 BST	Hume 25'; Angulo (yellow card) 42'; Gusto 50' (o.g.); Geertruida (yellow card) 51'; Xhaka (yellow card) 73'; Diarra (yellow card) 81'; Sadiki (yellow card) 89'	Report	Fofana (yellow card) 54' (yellow-red card) 62'; Palmer 56', (yellow card) 90+11'; Fernández (yellow card) 69'; João Pedro (yellow card) 90+7'	Stadium: Stadium of Light; Attendance: 47,155; Referee: Chris Kavanagh

=== FA Cup ===
As a Premier League club, Chelsea entered the competition in the third round, and were drawn away to Charlton Athletic. They were then drawn away to Hull City in the fourth round, away to Wrexham in the fifth round, and at home to Port Vale in the quarter-finals. Chelsea faced Leeds United in the semi-finals at Wembley, and played Manchester City in the final, ultimately losing 1–0.

Win Draw Loss Fixtures

10 January 2026 Third round	Charlton Athletic	1–5	Chelsea	Charlton
20:00 GMT	Docherty (yellow card) 31'; Leaburn 57'	Report	Badiashile (yellow card) 5'; Hato 45+4'; Adarabioyo 50'; Guiu 62'; Neto 90+1'; Fernández 90+4' (pen.)	Stadium: The Valley; Attendance: 26,475; Referee: Chris Kavanagh

13 February 2026 Fourth round	Hull City	0–4	Chelsea	Kingston upon Hull
19:45 GMT	Lundstram (yellow card) 73'; Gelhardt (yellow card) 90'	Report	Neto 40', 51', 71', (yellow card) 45+1'; Estêvão 59'; Sarr (yellow card) 66'	Stadium: MKM Stadium; Attendance: 24,320; Referee: Farai Hallam

7 March 2026 Fifth round	Wrexham	2–4 (a.e.t.)	Chelsea	Wrexham
17:45 GMT	Smith 18'; Doyle 78'; Dobson (red card) 90+3'; Thomason (yellow card) 101'; Moore (yellow card) 120'	Report	Lavia (yellow card) 23'; Okonkwo 40' (o.g.); Acheampong 82'; Garnacho 96', (yellow card) 120'; Andrey Santos (yellow card) 110'; João Pedro 120+5'	Stadium: Racecourse Ground; Attendance: 10,556; Referee: Peter Bankes

4 April 2026 Quarter-finals	Chelsea	7–0	Port Vale	Fulham
17:15 BST	Hato 2'; João Pedro 25'; Lawrence-Gabriel 43' (o.g.); Adarabioyo 57'; Andrey Santos 69'; Estêvão 82'; Garnacho 90+2' (pen.)	Report	Sherif (yellow card) 33'	Stadium: Stamford Bridge; Attendance: 38,375; Referee: Farai Hallam

26 April 2026 Semi-finals	Chelsea	1–0	Leeds United	Wembley
15:00 BST	Fernández 23'; Caicedo (yellow card) 60'; Palmer (yellow card) 77'; Neto (yellow card) 90+4'	Report	Struijk (yellow card) 76'; Ampadu (yellow card) 78'; Nmecha (yellow card) 84'; Bogle (yellow card) 90+4'	Stadium: Wembley Stadium; Attendance: 82,542; Referee: Jarred Gillett

16 May 2026 Final	Chelsea	0–1	Manchester City	Wembley
15:00 BST	Fernández (yellow card) 29'; Cucurella (yellow card) 32'; Caicedo (yellow card) 90+2'	Report	Khusanov (yellow card) 56'; Semenyo 72'	Stadium: Wembley Stadium; Attendance: 83,337; Referee: Darren England

=== EFL Cup ===
As one of the Premier League clubs competing in a European competition, Chelsea entered the competition in the third round, and were drawn away to League One club Lincoln City. They were then drawn away to Wolverhampton Wanderers in the fourth round, and away to Cardiff City in the quarter-finals. A two legged-tie against Arsenal was drawn for the semi-finals, with the first leg at home and second leg being away.

Win Draw Loss Fixtures

23 September 2025 Third round	Lincoln City	1–2	Chelsea	Lincoln
19:45 BST	Street 42'; Draper (yellow card) 56'; House (yellow card) 63'; Collins (yellow card) 83'	Report	Andrey Santos (yellow card) 22'; George 48'; Buonanotte 50'; Fernández (yellow card) 54'; Jörgensen (yellow card) 90'; Cucurella (yellow card) 90+3'	Stadium: Sincil Bank; Attendance: 10,214; Referee: Matt Donohue

29 October 2025 Fourth round	Wolverhampton Wanderers	3–4	Chelsea	Wolverhampton
19:45 GMT	R. Gomes (yellow card) 31'; Arokodare 48'; Hwang Hee-chan (yellow card) 54'; Wolfe 73', 90+1'; Krejčí (yellow card) 90+2'	Report	Andrey Santos 5'; George 15', (yellow card) 72'; Estêvão (yellow card) 24', (goal) 41'; Delap (yellow card) 79' (yellow-red card) 86'; Gittens 89'; Cucurella (yellow card) 90'; Caicedo (yellow card) 90+4'	Stadium: Molineux Stadium; Attendance: 24,449; Referee: Thomas Bramall

16 December 2025 Quarter-finals	Cardiff City	1–3	Chelsea	Cardiff
20:00 GMT	Davies (yellow card) 16'; Chambers (yellow card) 27'; Turnbull 75'	Report	Caicedo (yellow card) 45'; Garnacho 57', 90+3'; Neto 82'	Stadium: Cardiff City Stadium; Attendance: 33,027; Referee: Tony Harrington

14 January 2026 Semi-finals first leg	Chelsea	2–3	Arsenal	Fulham
20:00 GMT	Estêvão (yellow card) 42'; Cucurella (yellow card) 44'; Garnacho 57', 83'; Badiashile (yellow card) 65'; Neto (yellow card) 90'	Report	White 7'; Trossard (yellow card) 42'; Gyökeres 49'; Zubimendi 71'; Arrizabalaga (yellow card) 75'; Merino (yellow card) 78'; Timber (yellow card) 90+6'	Stadium: Stamford Bridge; Attendance: 39,243; Referee: Simon Hooper

3 February 2026 Semi-finals second leg	Arsenal	1–0 (4–2 agg.)	Chelsea	Holloway
20:00 GMT	Havertz 90+7'	Report	Delap (yellow card) 56'; Gusto (yellow card) 68'; Estêvão (yellow card) 71'	Stadium: Emirates Stadium; Attendance: 59,452; Referee: Peter Bankes

=== UEFA Champions League ===
==== League phase ====
Chelsea were drawn against Benfica, Ajax, Barcelona and Pafos at home, and Bayern Munich, Qarabağ, Atalanta and Napoli away in the league phase.

Win Draw Loss Fixtures

Pos	Team	Pld	W	D	L	GF	GA	GD	Pts	Qualification
4	(The Football Association) Tottenham Hotspur	8	5	2	1	17	7	+10	17	Advance to round of 16 (seeded)
5	(Royal Spanish Football Federation) Barcelona	8	5	1	2	22	14	+8	16	Advance to round of 16 (seeded)
6	(The Football Association) Chelsea	8	5	1	2	17	10	+7	16	Advance to round of 16 (seeded)
7	(Portuguese Football Federation) Sporting CP	8	5	1	2	17	11	+6	16	Advance to round of 16 (seeded)
8	(The Football Association) Manchester City	8	5	1	2	15	9	+6	16	Advance to round of 16 (seeded)

Source: UEFA
Rules for classification: League phase tiebreakers

===== Results summary =====
Overall								Home						Away					
Pld	W	D	L	GF	GA	GD	Pts	W	D	L	GF	GA	GD	W	D	L	GF	GA	GD
8	5	1	2	17	10	+7	16	4	0	0	10	1	+9	1	1	2	7	9	−2

Source: UEFA

Round	1	2	3	4	5	6	7	8
Ground	A	H	H	A	H	A	H	A
Result	L	W	W	D	W	L	W	W
Position	28	18	11	12	7	13	8	6
Points	0	3	6	7	10	10	13	16

Source: UEFA
A = Away; H = Home; W = Win; D = Draw; L = Loss

17 September 2025 1	Bayern Munich (Germany)	3–1	(England) Chelsea	Munich, Germany
21:00 CEST	Chalobah 20' (o.g.); Kane 27' (pen.), 63'; Tah (yellow card) 29'; Olise (yellow card) 85'; Laimer (yellow card) 85'	Report	Palmer 29'; Andrey Santos (yellow card) 90+6'	Stadium: Allianz Arena; Attendance: 75,000; Referee: José María Sánchez Martínez (Spain)

30 September 2025 2	Chelsea (England)	1–0	(Portugal) Benfica	London, England
20:00 BST	Ríos 18' (o.g.); Fernández (yellow card) 45+1'; Buonanotte (yellow card) 46'; João Pedro (yellow card) 62' (yellow-red card) 90+6'; Neto (yellow card) 88'	Report	Barrenechea (yellow card) 34'; Ríos (yellow card) 49'; Aursnes (yellow card) 64'; Otamendi (yellow card) 83'; Araújo (yellow card) 88'	Stadium: Stamford Bridge; Attendance: 38,636; Referee: Daniel Siebert (Germany)

22 October 2025 3	Chelsea (England)	5–1	(Netherlands) Ajax	London, England
20:00 BST	Guiu 18'; Caicedo 27'; Adarabioyo (yellow card) 31'; Fernández 45' (pen.); Estêvão 45+6' (pen.), (yellow card) 56'; George 48'	Report	Taylor (red card) 15'; Weghorst 33' (pen.), (yellow card) 45+5'	Stadium: Stamford Bridge; Attendance: 38,948; Referee: Felix Zwayer (Germany)

5 November 2025 4	Qarabağ (Azerbaijan)	2–2	(England) Chelsea	Baku, Azerbaijan
21:45 AZT	Andrade 29'; Janković 39' (pen.); Matheus Silva (yellow card) 47'; Medina (yellow card) 87'	Report	Estêvão 16'; Andrey Santos (yellow card) 44'; James (yellow card) 47'; Garnacho 53'; Caicedo (yellow card) 90+1'	Stadium: Tofiq Bahramov Republican Stadium; Attendance: 30,887; Referee: Sebastian Gishamer (Austria)

25 November 2025 5	Chelsea (England)	3–0	(Spain) Barcelona	London, England
20:00 GMT	Koundé 27' (o.g.); Gusto (yellow card) 40'; Estêvão 55'; Delap 73'	Report	Araújo (yellow card) 32' (yellow-red card) 44'	Stadium: Stamford Bridge; Attendance: 39,323; Referee: Slavko Vinčić (Slovenia)

9 December 2025 6	Atalanta (Italy)	2–1	(England) Chelsea	Bergamo, Italy
21:00 CET	Scamacca 55'; De Ketelaere 83'	Report	João Pedro 25'; Chalobah (yellow card) 29'	Stadium: Stadio Atleti Azzurri d'Italia; Attendance: 20,685; Referee: Alejandro Hernández Hernández (Spain)

21 January 2026 7	Chelsea (England)	1–0	(Cyprus) Pafos	London, England
20:00 GMT	Gittens (yellow card) 73'; Caicedo 78'; Fernández (yellow card) 86'	Report	Oršić (yellow card) 33'; Sema (yellow card) 56'; Šunjić (yellow card) 78'	Stadium: Stamford Bridge; Attendance: 30,774; Referee: Erik Lambrechts (Belgium)

28 January 2026 8	Napoli (Italy)	2–3	(England) Chelsea	Naples, Italy
21:00 CET	Juan Jesus (yellow card) 17'; Vergara 33'; Højlund 43'; Elmas (yellow card) 75'	Report	Fernández 19' (pen.); João Pedro 61', 82'; Fofana (yellow card) 88'	Stadium: Stadio Diego Armando Maradona; Attendance: 46,513; Referee: Clément Turpin (France)

==== Knockout phase ====
===== Round of 16 =====
Chelsea were drawn against Paris Saint-Germain in the round of 16, with the first leg being away.

11 March 2026 First leg	Paris Saint-Germain (France)	5–2	(England) Chelsea	Paris, France
21:00 CET	Barcola 10'; Dembélé 40'; Vitinha 74'; Kvaratskhelia 86', 90+4', (yellow card) 88'	Report	Gusto 28'; Fernández 57'	Stadium: Parc des Princes; Attendance: 47,566; Referee: Alejandro Hernández Hernández (Spain)

17 March 2026 Second leg	Chelsea (England)	0–3 (2–8 agg.)	(France) Paris Saint-Germain	London, England
20:00 GMT		Report	Kvaratskhelia 6'; Barcola 15'; Mayulu 62'	Stadium: Stamford Bridge; Attendance: 35,811; Referee: Slavko Vinčić (Slovenia)

== Statistics ==
=== Appearances ===
No.	Pos.	Player	Premier League	FA Cup	EFL Cup	UEFA Champions League	Total
1	GK	(Spain) Robert Sánchez	35	5	2	7+1	49+1
3	DF	(Spain) Marc Cucurella	31+3	2+1	2+2	8+1	43+7
4	DF	(England) Tosin Adarabioyo	7+8	4+1	2+1	3+2	16+12
5	DF	(France) Benoît Badiashile	7+2	2	1+1	3+1	13+4
6	DF	(England) Levi Colwill	2+1	1	0	0	3+1
7	FW	(Portugal) Pedro Neto	30+4	4+2	1+3	8	43+9
8	MF	(Argentina) Enzo Fernández	35+1	2+2	3+1	9+1	49+5
9	FW	(England) Liam Delap	12+16	2+4	1+1	1+4	16+25
10	MF	(England) Cole Palmer	24+2	2+1	0+1	3+1	29+5
11	FW	(England) Jamie Gittens	5+11	1	3	3+4	12+15
12	GK	(Denmark) Filip Jörgensen	3+2	1	3	3	10+2
14	MF	(Portugal) Dário Essugo	0+3	0+2	0	0	0+5
17	MF	(Brazil) Andrey Santos	13+14	4+1	5	3+3	25+18
19	DF	(Senegal) Mamadou Sarr	1+2	2	0	1	4+2
20	FW	(Brazil) João Pedro	31+4	3+1	2+1	6+2	42+8
21	DF	(Netherlands) Jorrel Hato	12+10	5	4+1	4	25+11
23	DF	(England) Trevoh Chalobah	31+3	1	3+1	6+2	41+6
24	DF	(England) Reece James	20+9	2	0	7+1	29+10
25	MF	(Ecuador) Moisés Caicedo	32+1	4	2+1	9+1	47+3
27	DF	(France) Malo Gusto	26+8	3+1	3+1	6+1	38+11
28	GK	(England) Teddy Sharman-Lowe	0	0	0	0	0
29	DF	(France) Wesley Fofana	20+5	3+1	3	5+1	31+7
34	DF	(England) Josh Acheampong	8+9	2+2	3+1	1+4	14+16
38	FW	(Spain) Marc Guiu	1+7	1+1	2	1	5+8
41	FW	(Brazil) Estêvão	12+10	2+1	2+2	4+3	20+16
44	GK	(United States) Gabriel Slonina	0	0	0	0	0
45	MF	(Belgium) Roméo Lavia	4+8	3	1	2+2	10+10
46	MF	(England) Reggie Walsh	0	0	0+1	0+1	0+2
49	FW	(Argentina) Alejandro Garnacho	14+10	4+2	1+3	3+6	22+21
55	FW	(England) Jesse Derry	1	0+2	0	0	1+2
62	FW	(England) Shim Mheuka	0+1	0+1	0+2	0	0+4
76	MF	(England) Ryan Kavuma-McQueen	0	0+1	0	0	0+1
	FW	(Ukraine) Mykhailo Mudryk	0	0	0	0	0+0
Players who have left the club
	MF	(Argentina) Facundo Buonanotte	1	1	3	2+1	7+1
	FW	(England) Tyrique George	0+4	0	3	2+2	5+6

Source: FBref.com

=== Goalscorers ===
Rank	No.	Pos.	Player	Premier League	FA Cup	EFL Cup	UEFA Champions League	Total
1	20	FW	(Brazil) João Pedro	15	2	0	3	20
2	8	MF	(Argentina) Enzo Fernández	10	2	0	3	15
3	10	MF	(England) Cole Palmer	10	0	0	1	11
4	7	FW	(Portugal) Pedro Neto	5	4	1	0	10
5	41	FW	(Brazil) Estêvão	2	2	1	3	8
5	49	FW	(Argentina) Alejandro Garnacho	1	2	4	1	8
7	25	MF	(Ecuador) Moisés Caicedo	3	0	0	2	5
8	17	MF	(Brazil) Andrey Santos	1	1	1	0	3
8	23	DF	(England) Trevoh Chalobah	3	0	0	0	3
8	27	DF	(France) Malo Gusto	2	0	0	1	3
8	32	FW	(England) Tyrique George	0	0	2	1	3
12	4	DF	(England) Tosin Adarabioyo	0	2	0	0	2
12	9	FW	(England) Liam Delap	1	0	0	1	2
12	21	DF	(Netherlands) Jorrel Hato	0	2	0	0	2
12	24	DF	(England) Reece James	2	0	0	0	2
12	34	DF	(England) Josh Acheampong	1	1	0	0	2
12	38	FW	(Spain) Marc Guiu	0	1	0	1	2
18	3	DF	(Spain) Marc Cucurella	1	0	0	0	1
18	11	FW	(England) Jamie Gittens	0	0	1	0	1
18	40	MF	(Argentina) Facundo Buonanotte	0	0	1	0	1
Own goals				1	2	0	2	5
Totals				58	21	11	19	109

Source: FBref.com

==== Hat-tricks ====
- Score – The score at the time of each goal. Chelsea's score listed first.

Date	No.	Pos.	Player	Score	Final score	Opponent	Competition
7 February 2026	10	MF	(England) Cole Palmer	1–0, 2–0, 3–0 (A)	3–1 (A)	Wolverhampton Wanderers	Premier League
13 February 2026	7	FW	(Portugal) Pedro Neto	1–0, 2–0, 4–0 (A)	4–0 (A)	Hull City	FA Cup
4 March 2026	20	FW	(Brazil) João Pedro	1–1, 2–1, 4–1 (A)	4–1 (A)	Aston Villa	Premier League

Source: FBref.com

=== Top assists ===
Rank	No.	Pos.	Player	Premier League	FA Cup	EFL Cup	UEFA Champions League	Total
1	7	FW	(Portugal) Pedro Neto	7	2	1	1	11
2	8	MF	(Argentina) Enzo Fernández	4	1	0	2	7
3	20	FW	(Brazil) João Pedro	5	0	1	0	6
3	24	DF	(England) Reece James	4	0	0	2	6
5	11	FW	(England) Jamie Gittens	2	0	2	1	5
5	27	DF	(France) Malo Gusto	3	1	0	1	5
7	3	DF	(Spain) Marc Cucurella	4	0	0	0	4
7	49	FW	(Argentina) Alejandro Garnacho	4	0	0	0	4
9	9	FW	(England) Liam Delap	0	3	0	0	3
9	10	MF	(England) Cole Palmer	1	0	0	2	3
9	17	MF	(Brazil) Andrey Santos	0	0	2	1	3
9	41	FW	(Brazil) Estêvão	2	1	0	0	3
13	14	MF	(Portugal) Dário Essugo	0	2	0	0	2
13	29	DF	(France) Wesley Fofana	1	0	0	1	2
13	38	FW	(Spain) Marc Guiu	1	1	0	0	2
13	40	FW	(Argentina) Facundo Buonanotte	0	1	1	0	2
17	1	GK	(Spain) Robert Sánchez	1	0	0	0	1
17	21	DF	(Netherlands) Jorrel Hato	0	0	1	0	1
17	25	MF	(Ecuador) Moisés Caicedo	1	0	0	0	1
17	32	FW	(England) Tyrique George	0	0	1	0	1
Totals				40	12	9	11	72

Source: FBref.com

=== Clean sheets ===
Rank	No.	Pos.	Player	Premier League	FA Cup	EFL Cup	UEFA Champions League	Total
1	1	GK	(Spain) Robert Sánchez	9	3	0	2	14
Shared				0	0	0	1 (Note: Shared between Filip Jörgensen and Robert Sánchez against Pafos in the UEFA Champions League)	1
Totals				9	3	0	3	15

Source: FBref.com

=== Discipline ===
No.	Pos.	Player	Premier League			FA Cup			EFL Cup			UEFA Champions League			Total		
No.	Pos.	Player	Yellow card	(yellow card) (yellow-red card)	Red card	Yellow card	(yellow card) (yellow-red card)	Red card	Yellow card	(yellow card) (yellow-red card)	Red card	Yellow card	(yellow card) (yellow-red card)	Red card	Yellow card	(yellow card) (yellow-red card)	Red card
1	GK	(Spain) Robert Sánchez	3	0	1	0	0	0	0	0	0	0	0	0	3	0	1
3	DF	(Spain) Marc Cucurella	8	0	1	1	0	0	3	0	0	0	0	0	12	0	1
4	DF	(England) Tosin Adarabioyo	2	0	0	0	0	0	0	0	0	1	0	0	3	0	0
5	DF	(France) Benoît Badiashile	2	0	0	1	0	0	1	0	0	0	0	0	4	0	0
6	DF	(England) Levi Colwill	0	0	0	0	0	0	0	0	0	0	0	0	0	0	0
7	FW	(Portugal) Pedro Neto	3	1	0	2	0	0	1	0	0	1	0	0	7	1	0
8	MF	(Argentina) Enzo Fernández	10	0	0	1	0	0	1	0	0	2	0	0	14	0	0
9	FW	(England) Liam Delap	4	0	0	0	0	0	1	1	0	0	0	0	5	1	0
10	MF	(England) Cole Palmer	5	0	0	1	0	0	0	0	0	0	0	0	6	0	0
11	FW	(England) Jamie Gittens	0	0	0	0	0	0	0	0	0	1	0	0	1	0	0
12	GK	(Denmark) Filip Jörgensen	0	0	0	0	0	0	1	0	0	0	0	0	1	0	0
14	MF	(Portugal) Dário Essugo	2	0	0	0	0	0	0	0	0	0	0	0	2	0	0
17	MF	(Brazil) Andrey Santos	4	0	0	1	0	0	1	0	0	2	0	0	8	0	0
19	DF	(Senegal) Mamadou Sarr	0	0	0	1	0	0	0	0	0	0	0	0	1	0	0
20	FW	(Brazil) João Pedro	4	0	0	0	0	0	0	0	0	1	1	0	5	1	0
21	DF	(Netherlands) Jorrel Hato	7	0	0	0	0	0	0	0	0	0	0	0	7	0	0
23	DF	(England) Trevoh Chalobah	3	0	1	0	0	0	0	0	0	1	0	0	4	0	1
24	DF	(England) Reece James	4	0	0	0	0	0	0	0	0	1	0	0	5	0	0
25	MF	(Ecuador) Moisés Caicedo	11	0	1	2	0	0	2	0	0	1	0	0	16	0	1
27	DF	(France) Malo Gusto	3	1	0	0	0	0	1	0	0	1	0	0	5	1	0
28	GK	(England) Teddy Sharman-Lowe	0	0	0	0	0	0	0	0	0	0	0	0	0	0	0
29	DF	(France) Wesley Fofana	7	2	0	0	0	0	0	0	0	1	0	0	8	2	0
34	DF	(England) Josh Acheampong	1	0	0	0	0	0	0	0	0	0	0	0	1	0	0
38	FW	(Spain) Marc Guiu	1	0	0	0	0	0	0	0	0	0	0	0	1	0	0
41	FW	(Brazil) Estêvão	4	0	0	0	0	0	3	0	0	1	0	0	8	0	0
44	GK	(United States) Gabriel Slonina	0	0	0	0	0	0	0	0	0	0	0	0	0	0	0
45	MF	(Belgium) Roméo Lavia	0	0	0	1	0	0	0	0	0	0	0	0	1	0	0
46	MF	(England) Reggie Walsh	0	0	0	0	0	0	0	0	0	0	0	0	0	0	0
49	FW	(Argentina) Alejandro Garnacho	2	0	0	1	0	0	0	0	0	0	0	0	3	0	0
55	FW	(England) Jesse Derry	0	0	0	0	0	0	0	0	0	0	0	0	0	0	0
62	FW	(England) Shim Mheuka	0	0	0	0	0	0	0	0	0	0	0	0	0	0	0
76	FW	(England) Ryan Kavuma-McQueen	0	0	0	0	0	0	0	0	0	0	0	0	0	0	0
	FW	(Ukraine) Mykhailo Mudryk	0	0	0	0	0	0	0	0	0	0	0	0	0	0	0
Players who have left the club
	MF	(Argentina) Facundo Buonanotte	0	0	0	0	0	0	0	0	0	1	0	0	1	0	0
	FW	(England) Tyrique George	2	0	0	0	0	0	1	0	0	0	0	0	3	0	0
Totals			88	4	4	12	0	0	16	1	0	15	1	0	131	6	4

Source: FBref.com

== Awards ==
=== Player awards ===
==== Premier League Player of the Month ====
Month	Pos.	Player	Pld	G	A	CS	S	Result	Ref.
August 2025	FW	(Brazil) João Pedro	3	2	2	–	–	Nominated	
November 2025	DF	(England) Reece James	4	0	1	3	–	Nominated	
January 2026	MF	(Argentina) Enzo Fernandez	5	3	1	–	–	Nominated	

==== Premier League Goal of the Month ====
- Score – The score at the time of the goal. Chelsea's score listed first.

Month	Pos.	Player	Score	Final score	Opponent	Date	Result	Ref.
October 2025	MF	(Ecuador) Moisés Caicedo	1–0	2–1 (H)	Liverpool	4 October	Nominated	

=== Manager awards ===
==== Premier League Manager of the Month ====
Month	Manager	M	W	D	L	GF	GA	GD	Pts	Result	Ref.
August 2025	(Italy) Enzo Maresca	3	2	1	0	7	1	+6	7	Nominated	
November 2025	(Italy) Enzo Maresca	4	3	1	0	7	1	+6	10	Won	
January 2026	(England) Liam Rosenior	3	3	0	0	8	3	+5	9	Nominated	
