= 2026 FA Cup final =

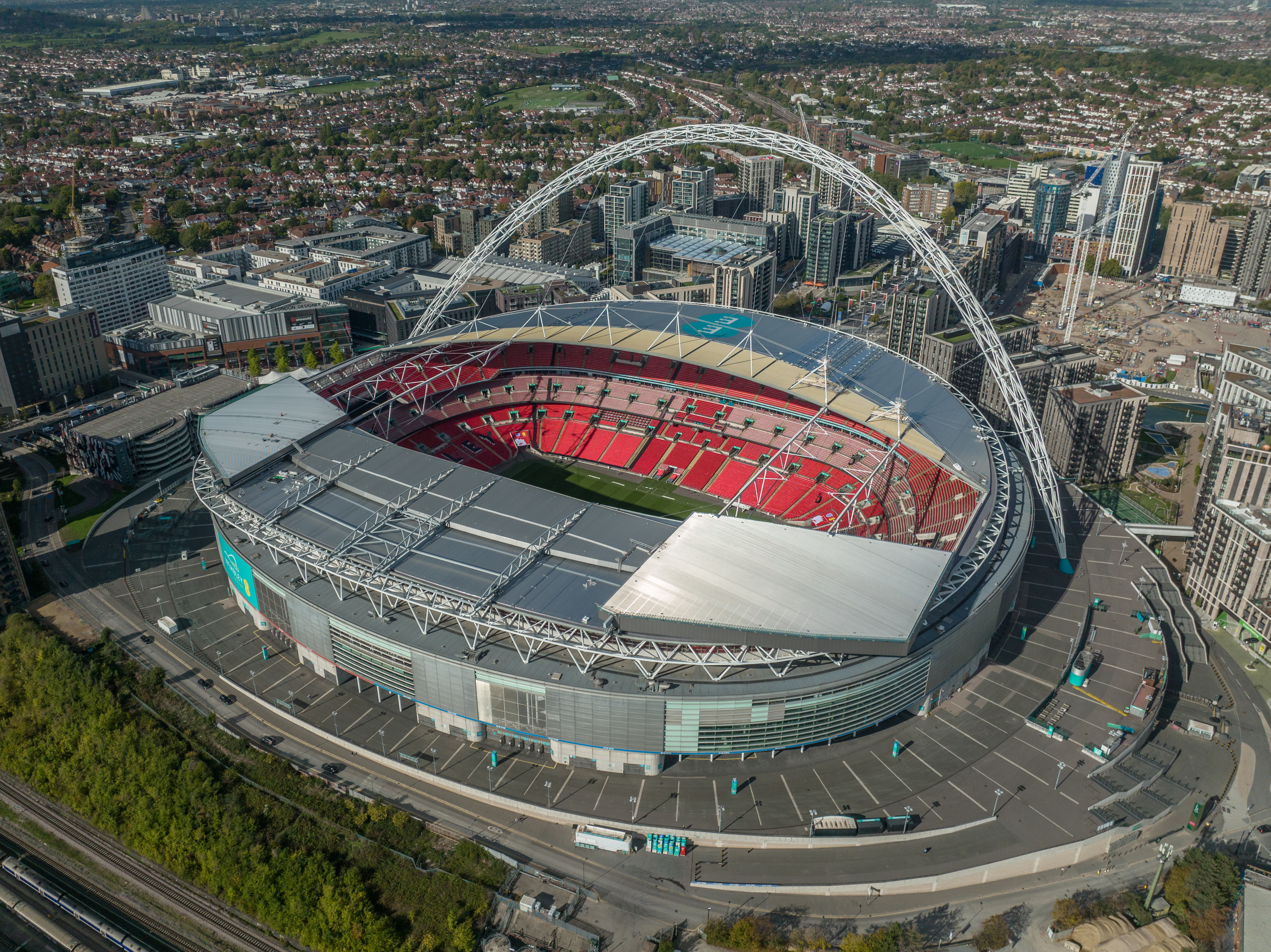
- The match took place at Wembley Stadium.
- Event: 2025–26 FA Cup
Chelsea	Manchester City
0	1
- Date: 16 May 2026
- Venue: Wembley Stadium, London
- Man of the Match: Antoine Semenyo (Manchester City)
- Referee: Darren England (South Yorkshire)
- Attendance: 83,337

The 2026 FA Cup final was a football match played at Wembley Stadium in London, England, on 16 May 2026 between Chelsea and Manchester City to determine the winners of the 2025–26 FA Cup. It was the 145th final of English football's primary cup competition, the Football Association Challenge Cup.

Chelsea played in their 17th FA Cup final and the first since 2022, when they lost for a record third consecutive time. They were seeking a ninth Cup title. Manchester City played in their 15th FA Cup final overall and the fourth consecutively, the first ever team to do so. They were seeking an eighth Cup title.

The clubs' most recent meeting in a title-deciding match was the 2021 UEFA Champions League final, which Chelsea won 1–0. The two sides have never before met in an FA Cup final, but have clashed in other domestic title-deciding matches, most recently in the 2019 EFL Cup final and the 2018 FA Community Shield, both of which City won. They met twice in the season's Premier League, a 1–1 draw in Manchester followed by City's 3–0 win in London.

Manchester City won 1–0 in the match, through a goal from Antoine Semenyo, achieving their 8th FA Cup title.

== Route to the final ==
=== Chelsea ===
Chelsea's route to the final
Round	Opposition	Score
3rd	Charlton Athletic (A)	5–1
4th	Hull City (A)	4–0
5th	Wrexham (A)	4–2 (a.e.t.)
QF	Port Vale (H)	7–0
SF	Leeds United (N)	1–0
Key: (H) = Home venue; (A) = Away venue; (N) = Neutral venue

As a Premier League team, Chelsea entered the tournament in the third round, beginning their FA Cup campaign with a dominant 5–1 away victory over Championship side Charlton Athletic, in what was Liam Rosenior's first match in charge of the club. Goals came from Tosin Adarabioyo, Marc Guiu, Pedro Neto, Enzo Fernández, and Jorrel Hato, the latter scoring his first for Chelsea. Pedro Neto notched his first Chelsea hat-trick in the fourth round away to Hull City. Estêvão also contributed to the scoring, the match finishing 4–0 to the Blues. In the fifth round, Chelsea were drawn away yet again, this time against Championship club Wrexham, who proved to be much tougher opposition than those in previous rounds. Sam Smith and Callum Doyle got their names on the scoresheet for the Welsh club, with a late Josh Acheampong goal forcing extra time. Alejandro Garnacho and João Pedro both scored in extra time to secure a 4–2 win for Chelsea.

In the quarter-finals, Chelsea were drawn against tournament underdogs Port Vale. Chelsea made light work of the League One side, defeating them 7–0 at Stamford Bridge, their largest FA Cup victory since 2011, where Chelsea eased past Ipswich Town by the same scoreline. Jorrel Hato, João Pedro, Tosin Adarabioyo, Andrey Santos, Estêvão, and Alejandro Garnacho all found the net during the match, along with an own goal from Port Vale defender Jordan Lawrence-Gabriel. Chelsea faced Premier League rivals Leeds United in the semi-finals at Wembley, where a lone goal from Enzo Fernández was enough to secure a 1–0 victory and send the Blues to the FA Cup final. Chelsea is seeking their first FA Cup victory since beating Manchester United 1–0 in 2018.

=== Manchester City ===
Manchester City's route to the final
Round	Opposition	Score
3rd	Exeter City (H)	10–1
4th	Salford City (H)	2–0
5th	Newcastle United (A)	3–1
QF	Liverpool (H)	4–0
SF	Southampton (N)	2–1
Key: (H) = Home venue; (A) = Away venue; (N) = Neutral venue

As a Premier League team, Manchester City entered the tournament in the third round. City began their FA Cup campaign with a rampant 10–1 display at home against League One side Exeter City. Manchester City's ten goals came from seven different players and two own goals, with Rico Lewis scoring two goals, and Jake Doyle-Hayes and Jack Fitzwater each scoring an own goal. Max Alleyne, Rodri, Antoine Semenyo, Tijjani Reijnders, Nico O'Reilly, and Ryan McAidoo all scored for the home team, with George Birch scoring a consolation for Exeter. This was their biggest win since defeating Huddersfield Town by the same score in 1987. City next faced Salford City at home in the fourth round, and a goal from Marc Guéhi and an own goal from Alfie Dorrington helped overcome the League Two side to reach the fifth round, winning 2–0. In the fifth round, City defeated fellow Premier League side Newcastle United 3–1 at St James' Park. Despite an opener from Newcastle's Harvey Barnes, City came back due to two goals by Omar Marmoush, and a goal from Savinho.

In the quarter-finals, Manchester City were drawn against eight-time cup winners Liverpool, facing them at home. An Erling Haaland hat-trick and a goal from Antoine Semenyo helped City run out 4–0 victors, easing into their eighth FA Cup semi-final in a row. Despite a 79th minute goal from Finn Azaz, City defeated Championship side Southampton 2–1 in the semi-finals at Wembley, as City mounted a late comeback through goals from Jérémy Doku and Nico González. This marked the first time any team has reached four consecutive FA Cup finals, having previously played in the 2023, 2024 and 2025 finals respectively.

== Match ==
=== Summary ===
In the 72nd minute, Manchester City scored the only goal of the match when Antoine Semenyo back flicked the ball with his right leg into the left corner of the net after a low cross from the right from Erling Haaland. It was the only goal of the game as Manchester City won the game 1–0 and completed the domestic cup double after also winning the 2026 EFL Cup final in March.

=== Details ===
16 May 2026
15:00 BST

Chelsea	0–1	Manchester City
	Report	Semenyo 72'

Wembley Stadium, London
Attendance: 83,337
Referee: Darren England (South Yorkshire)

Chelsea	Manchester City

GK	1	(Spain) Robert Sánchez
RB	27	(France) Malo Gusto
CB	29	(France) Wesley Fofana
CB	6	(England) Levi Colwill
LB	21	(Netherlands) Jorrel Hato
CM	24	(England) Reece James (c)		(substituted off) 83'
CM	25	(Ecuador) Moisés Caicedo	(yellow card) 90+2'
RW	10	(England) Cole Palmer
AM	8	(Argentina) Enzo Fernández	(yellow card) 29'
LW	3	(Spain) Marc Cucurella	(yellow card) 32'	(substituted off) 74'
CF	20	(Brazil) João Pedro		(substituted off) 86'
Substitutes:
GK	12	(Denmark) Filip Jörgensen
DF	4	(England) Tosin Adarabioyo
DF	23	(England) Trevoh Chalobah
DF	34	(England) Josh Acheampong
MF	14	(Portugal) Dário Essugo
MF	17	(Brazil) Andrey Santos
FW	7	(Portugal) Pedro Neto		(substituted on) 74'
FW	9	(England) Liam Delap		(substituted on) 83'
FW	49	(Argentina) Alejandro Garnacho		(substituted on) 86'
Caretaker manager:
(England) Calum McFarlane

GK	1	(England) James Trafford
RB	27	(Portugal) Matheus Nunes
CB	45	(Uzbekistan) Abdukodir Khusanov	(yellow card) 56'
CB	15	(England) Marc Guéhi
LB	33	(England) Nico O'Reilly
CM	16	(Spain) Rodri		(substituted off) 65'
CM	20	(Portugal) Bernardo Silva (c)
RW	42	(Ghana) Antoine Semenyo
AM	7	(Egypt) Omar Marmoush		(substituted off) 46'
LW	11	(Belgium) Jérémy Doku
CF	9	(Norway) Erling Haaland
Substitutes:
GK	25	(Italy) Gianluigi Donnarumma
DF	3	(Portugal) Rúben Dias
DF	5	(England) John Stones
DF	6	(Netherlands) Nathan Aké
MF	4	(Netherlands) Tijjani Reijnders
MF	8	(Croatia) Mateo Kovačić		(substituted on) 65'
MF	10	(France) Rayan Cherki		(substituted on) 46'
MF	26	(Brazil) Savinho
MF	47	(England) Phil Foden
Manager:
(Spain) Pep Guardiola

Assistant referees:
Tim Wood (Gloucestershire)
Akil Howson (Leicestershire)
Fourth official:
Sam Barrott (West Yorkshire)
Reserve assistant referee:
Steve Meredith (Nottinghamshire)
Video assistant referee:
Peter Bankes (Merseyside)
Assistant video assistant referee:
Nick Hopton (Derbyshire)

Match rules

- 90 minutes
- 30 minutes of extra time if necessary
- Penalty shoot-out if scores still level
- Nine named substitutes
- Maximum of five substitutions, with a sixth allowed in extra time (Note: Each team was given only three opportunities to make substitutions, with a fourth opportunity in extra time, excluding substitutions made at half-time, before the start of extra time and at half-time in extra time.)
