= Tyrique George =

English footballer (born 2006)

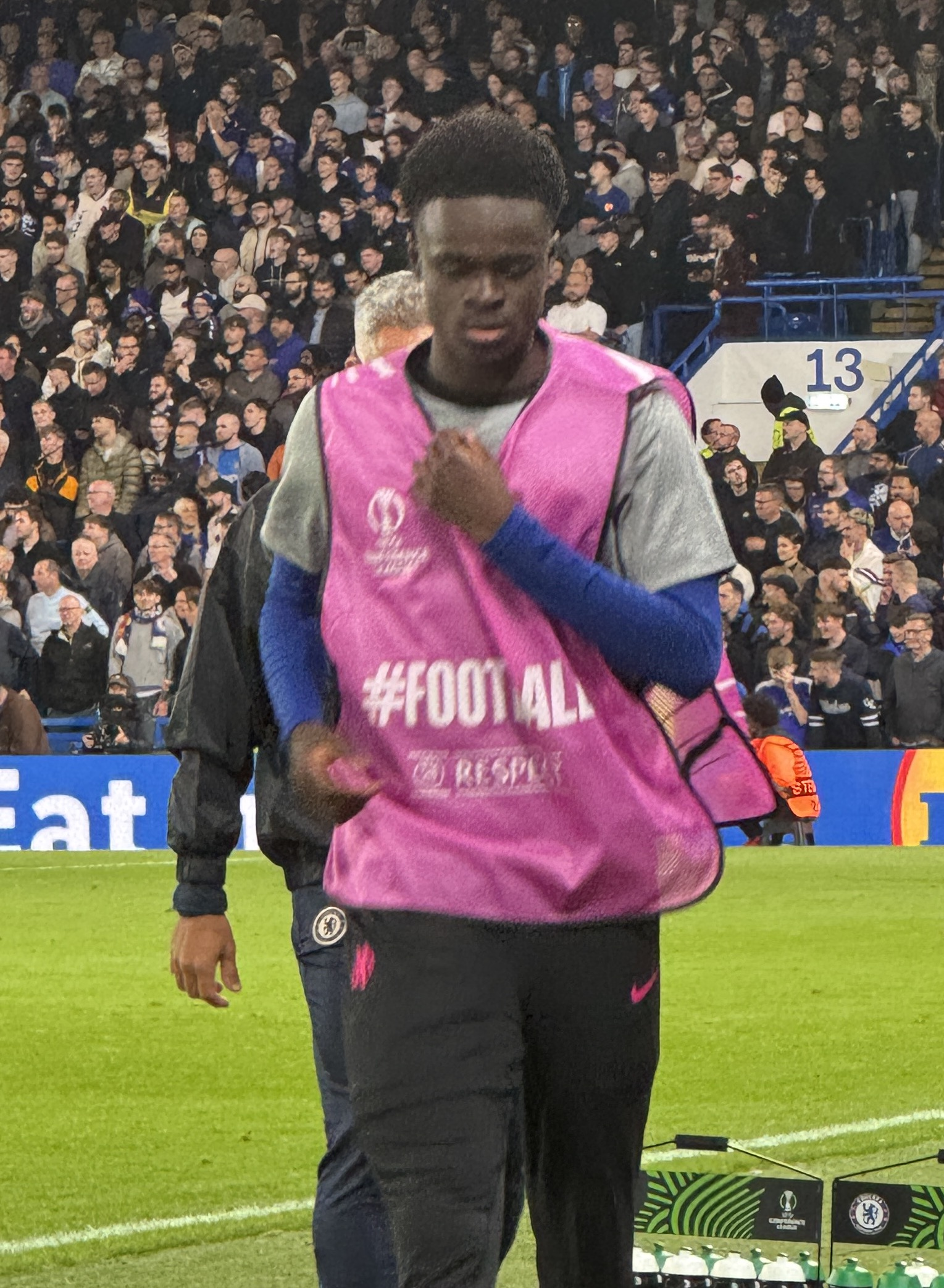
- George warming up for Chelsea in 2024

Personal information
- Full name: Tyrique Aaron Delali Yusuff George
- Date of birth: 4 February 2006 (age 20)
- Place of birth: Camden, England
- Height: 6 ft 1 in (1.85 m)
- Position: Winger

Team information
- Current team: Everton
- Number: 19

Youth career
- 2014–2024: Chelsea

Senior career*
Years	Team	Apps	(Gls)
2024–2026	Chelsea	12	(1)
2026	→ Everton (loan)	11	(0)
2026–	Everton	10	(1)

International career^{‡}
2021–2022	England U16	11	(1)
2022–2023	England U17	5	(0)
2023–2024	England U18	6	(1)
2024–2025	England U19	12	(1)
2025–	England U21	10	(2)
- * Club domestic league appearances and goals as of 22:36, 6 November 2026 (UTC) ‡ National team caps and goals as of 23:23, 13 November 2026 (UTC)

Tyrique Aaron Delali Yusuff George (born 4 February 2006) is an English professional footballer who plays as a winger for Premier League club Everton.

== Club career ==
=== Early life ===
Born in London, and brought up in Selsdon. George was educated at Royal Russell School in Croydon. He trained with Unique FA from the age of 11 to 14. He is also listed by AF Global Football as a graduate of its academy programme, having joined their set-up at age 12.

=== Chelsea ===
George joined the academy of Chelsea in 2014 as an under-8. On 22 April 2023, George scored a 35-yard goal against Crystal Palace in an U18 Premier League match. The goal was shortlisted for Chelsea's Goal of the Month award for April 2023.

George was an unused substitute in Chelsea’s 6–0 home Premier League victory over Everton on 15 April 2024. Later that year, on 17 June, he signed a new contract with the club until 2027, with an additional one-year option.

On 29 August 2024, George made his senior debut for Chelsea as a substitute in a 2–1 defeat against Servette at the 2024–25 UEFA Conference League play-off round. On 10 April 2025, George scored his first goal for Chelsea in the UEFA Conference League quarter-final in a 3–0 away win over Legia Warsaw. On 20 April 2025, George scored his first Premier League goal in a 2–1 away victory over local rivals Fulham, that helped secure Chelsea’s qualification for the following seasons UEFA Champions League. He was on the bench for the UEFA Conference League final in a 4–1 win over Real Betis and received a medal for his contributions in the tournament.

George travelled with the squad to the 2025 FIFA Club World Cup and scored a goal in a group stage victory over Espérance de Tunis to qualify for the knockout phase. He was an unused substitute in the final as Chelsea defeated Paris Saint-Germain to win the tournament. Later that year, on 22 October, George scored his first UEFA Champions League goal in a 5–1 victory over Ajax.

==== Loan to Everton ====
On 2 February 2026, George joined Everton on loan until the end of the season, with an option to make the deal permanent.

=== Everton ===
On 6 July 2026, he joined Everton on a permanent deal worth up to £24 million, signing a four-year contract with the club. On 6 September, George scored his first competitive goal for Everton in a 2-2 draw against Manchester United at Hill Dickinson Stadium.

== International career ==
Having played for England at Under-16, Under-17, and Under-18 levels, George made 12 appearances for the Under-19s during his breakthrough into the Chelsea senior side in the 2024–25 season, scoring in a friendly against Croatia.

In October 2025, George made his England Under-21 debut, coming on as a substitute for Chelsea teammate Jamie Gittens in a win over Moldova. Four days later, he scored his first goal at that level in his first start—a winning shot against Andorra, assisted by Gittens. The following month, George scored his second goal in three appearances for England Under-21s in a European Under-21 Championship qualifying victory against the Republic of Ireland.

== Personal life ==
Tyrique George was born in Camden, London, England, to a Ghanaian mother and a Nigerian father.

== Career statistics ==
As of match played 11 October 2026

Appearances and goals by club, season and competition
Club	Season	League			FA Cup		EFL Cup		Europe		Other		Total	
Club	Season	Division	Apps	Goals	Apps	Goals	Apps	Goals	Apps	Goals	Apps	Goals	Apps	Goals
Chelsea U21	2023–24	—			—		—		—		3 (Note: Appearances in EFL Trophy)	0	3	0
Chelsea	2024–25	Premier League	8	1	2	0	1	0	13 (Note: Appearances in UEFA Conference League)	1	2 (Note: Appearances in FIFA Club World Cup)	1	26	3
Chelsea	2025–26	Premier League	4	0	0	0	3	2	4 (Note: Appearance in UEFA Champions League)	1	—		11	3
Chelsea	Total		12	1	2	0	4	2	17	2	2	1	37	6
Everton (loan)	2025–26	Premier League	11	0	—		—		—		—		11	0
Everton	2026–27	Premier League	6	1	0	0	2	0	—		—		8	1
Career total			29	2	2	0	2	2	17	2	5	1	59	7

== Honours ==
Chelsea

- UEFA Conference League: 2024–25
- FIFA Club World Cup: 2025

England U18

- Pinatar U18 Super Cup: 2024

Individual

- Chelsea's Academy Player Of the Season: 2025
