= Christopher Atherton =

Irish footballer (born 2008)

Personal information
- Full name: Christopher Atherton
- Date of birth: 19 October 2008 (age 18)
- Place of birth: Armagh, Northern Ireland
- Height: 1.77 m (5 ft 10 in)
- Positions: Midfielder; forward

Team information
- Current team: Ipswich Town

Youth career
- 2013–2022: Glenavon
- 2025–2026: Chelsea

Senior career*
Years	Team	Apps	(Gls)
2022–2025	Glenavon	26	(1)
2026–	Ipswich Town	0	(0)

International career^{‡}
2022–2023	Northern Ireland U16	7	(1)
2023–2025	Northern Ireland U17	11	(0)
2026–	Republic of Ireland U19	7	(0)
- * Club domestic league appearances and goals as of 20:44, 17 July 2026 (UTC) ‡ National team caps and goals as of 16:12, 11 November 2026 (UTC)

Christopher Atherton (born 19 October 2008) is an Irish footballer who plays as a midfielder for Ipswich Town.

== Club career ==
=== Glenavon ===
Atherton joined Glenavon at the age of five, as his elder brother was already enrolled in the club's academy. At the age of six, he was already playing at under-10 level, playing against players three years older than him. He also played Gaelic football as a youth, playing as a full forward for Maghery. He chose to focus on association football in the summer of 2022, when given the choice to represent Glenavon at the SuperCupNI, as the Northern Irish side finished runners-up to English side Charlton Athletic.

He trained with the Glenavon senior squad for the first time at the end of the 2021–22 season, at the age of thirteen. Manager Gary Hamilton was quoted as describing Atherton as "the best young player [he's] seen come through".

Atherton made his debut for Glenavon in a 6–0 Irish League Cup win against Dollingstown on 13 September 2022. Coming on as a substitute, he recorded an assist for Glenavon's sixth goal. In doing so, he became the youngest player ever in the United Kingdom, at 13 years and 329 days, breaking the record held by Scottish footballer Jordan Allan. The decision to play Atherton at such a young age drew criticism from some, with former Northern Irish international footballer Gareth McAuley disagreeing with the decision, suggesting that Glenavon had only handed Atherton his debut to garner a higher fee if he were to move to the academy of another side.

Following his debut, he drew the attention of English Premier League sides Chelsea and Manchester City, going on trial with the former, also spending time trialling with Scottish sides Dundee United and Rangers. In February 2023, Atherton was reported to have joined Chelsea, having been pictured at the club's stadium, Stamford Bridge, holding the club's kit.

=== Chelsea ===
On 3 July 2025, Glenavon confirmed that Atherton had moved to Chelsea.

=== Ipswich Town ===
On 17 July 2026, Atherton joined the academy of Ipswich Town on a permanent basis.

== International career ==
Atherton is eligible to represent Northern Ireland, Scotland, as his father was born in Glasgow, and the Republic of Ireland, trialling with the youth side of the latter in 2021.

He was called up to the Northern Ireland under-16 squad for a mini tournament in October 2022, playing against Finland and Estonia, scoring against the latter. He was called up again for the Victory Shield, getting an assist against Wales in a 2–0 win. Having made a further four appearances in friendly matches in 2023 he was called up to the Northern Ireland under-17 squad later in the same year.

On 25 February 2026, Atherton's request to his switch international allegiance to the Republic of Ireland was approved by FIFA. He received his first call up to the Republic of Ireland U19 squad in March 2026.

== Style of play ==
A player with a low centre of gravity, Atherton often takes players on during games, with Glenavon manager Gary Hamilton describing him as a player similar to Bernardo Silva or Phil Foden, able to play in both midfield and the forward line.

== Career statistics ==
As of 19 April 2025

Appearances and goals by club, season and competition
Club	Season	League			National cup (Note: Includes Irish Cup)		League cup (Note: Includes Irish League Cup)		Other		Total	
Club	Season	Division	Apps	Goals	Apps	Goals	Apps	Goals	Apps	Goals	Apps	Goals
Glenavon	2022–23	NIFL Premiership	2	0	0	0	1	0	1 (Note: Appearances in NIFL Premiership UEFA Europa Conference League play-offs)	0	4	0
Glenavon	2024–25	NIFL Premiership	24	1	2	0	2	0	2	1	30	2
Career total			26	1	2	0	3	0	3	1	34	2

== Honours ==
Chelsea U18

- U18 Premier League – National Champions: 2025–26
- U18 Premier League – Southern Champions: 2025–26
