= Josh Acheampong =

English footballer (born 2006)

Personal information
- Full name: Joshua Kofi Acheampong
- Date of birth: 5 May 2006 (age 20)
- Place of birth: Waltham Forest, England
- Height: 6 ft 3 in (1.90 m)
- Position: Defender

Team information
- Current team: Chelsea
- Number: 34

Youth career
- 2014–2024: Chelsea

Senior career*
Years	Team	Apps	(Gls)
2024–	Chelsea	31	(1)

International career^{‡}
2022	England U16	3	(0)
2022–2023	England U17	19	(1)
2023–2024	England U18	4	(0)
2024–2025	England U19	8	(0)
2024–	England U20	2	(0)
2025–	England U21	8	(1)
- * Club domestic league appearances and goals as of 14:34, 21 November 2026 (UTC) ‡ National team caps and goals as of 21:29, 2 October 2026 (UTC)

Joshua Kofi Acheampong (born 5 May 2006) is an English professional footballer who plays as a defender, whether at right-back or centre-back , for Premier League club Chelsea. He has represented England as a youth international at multiple levels.

== Early life ==
Born in London, Acheampong is of British Ghanaian and Irish descent. Acheampong's middle name “Kofi” refers to a male child born on Friday in Ghana. He first joined the Chelsea academy as an Under-8. Acheampong is eligible to play for England by birth, and Ghana and the Republic of Ireland through his parents. Acheampong attended Forest School, Walthamstow, in Walthamstow, London.

== Club career ==
On 3 January 2024, Acheampong signed his first professional contract with Chelsea. On 11 March 2024, Acheampong was named in the Chelsea first team squad in the Premier League match against Newcastle United but remained an unused substitute On 2 May 2024, three days before his 18th birthday, Acheampong made his professional debut, coming on as a substitute in the 85th minute of a 2–0 Chelsea victory at Stamford Bridge over their London derby rivals Tottenham Hotspur in the Premier League.

Following a period of time away from the first team due to problems regarding the extension of his contract, he made his full debut against FC Astana on 12 December 2024 in the UEFA Conference League. On 18 December, Chelsea announced that they have reached an agreement to extend Acheampong's contract to June 2029. On 4 January 2025, Acheampong made his first Premier League start against London rivals Crystal Palace, with the match ending 1–1 wherein the Chelsea head coach Enzo Maresca hailed him as the best player on the pitch. On 18 October 2025, he scored his first senior goal for Chelsea in a 3–0 away win against Nottingham Forest.

== International career ==
Acheampong is eligible for the England, Ireland and Ghana national teams.

In May 2023, Acheampong was a member of the England under-17 squad that finished fifth at the 2023 UEFA European Under-17 Championship. In November 2023 he was selected to represent England at the 2023 FIFA U-17 World Cup and scored a goal in their opening game against New Caledonia.

On 4 September 2024, Acheampong made his England U19 debut against Italy in Nedelišće.

On 10 October, Acheampong made his U20 debut during a 2–1 win over Italy in Frosinone.

On 8 September 2025, Acheampong made his debut for the England U21 during a 2–0 away win over Kazakhstan at the UEFA U21 Championship Qualification.

== Career statistics ==
As of match played 21 November 2026

Appearances and goals by club, season and competition
Club	Season	League			FA Cup		EFL Cup		Europe		Other		Total	
Club	Season	Division	Apps	Goals	Apps	Goals	Apps	Goals	Apps	Goals	Apps	Goals	Apps	Goals
Chelsea	2023–24	Premier League	1	0	0	0	0	0	—		—		1	0
Chelsea	2024–25	Premier League	4	0	0	0	1	0	7 (Note: Appearances in UEFA Conference League)	0	1 (Note: Appearance in FIFA Club World Cup)	0	13	0
Chelsea	2025–26	Premier League	17	1	4	1	4	0	5 (Note: Appearances in UEFA Champions League)	0	—		30	2
Chelsea	2026–27	Premier League	9	0	0	0	3	0	—		—		12	0
Career total			31	1	4	1	8	0	12	0	1	0	56	2

== Honours ==
Chelsea

- UEFA Conference League: 2024–25
- FIFA Club World Cup: 2025
- FA Cup runner-up: 2025–26
