= Tosin Adarabioyo =

English footballer (born 1997)

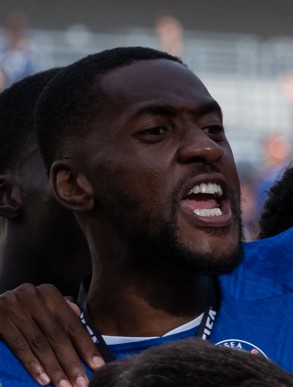
- Adarabioyo with Chelsea in 2025

Personal information
- Full name: Abdul-Nasir Oluwatosin Oluwadoyinsolami Adarabioyo
- Date of birth: 24 September 1997 (age 29)
- Place of birth: Paddington, London, England
- Height: 6 ft 5 in (1.96 m)
- Position: Centre-back

Team information
- Current team: Tottenham Hotspur
- Number: 4

Youth career
- –2003: Fletcher Moss Rangers
- 2003–2016: Manchester City

Senior career*
Years	Team	Apps	(Gls)
2016–2020	Manchester City	0	(0)
2018–2019	→ West Bromwich Albion (loan)	29	(0)
2019–2020	→ Blackburn Rovers (loan)	34	(3)
2020–2024	Fulham	119	(5)
2024–2026	Chelsea	38	(1)
2026–	Tottenham Hotspur	2	(0)

International career
2012–2013	England U16	5	(0)
2013	England U17	3	(0)
2014–2015	England U18	5	(0)
2015	England U19	1	(0)
- * Club domestic league appearances and goals as of 09:56, 20 November 2026 (UTC)

Abdul-Nasir Oluwatosin Oluwadoyinsolami Adarabioyo (born 24 September 1997), sometimes known mononymously as Tosin, is an English professional footballer who plays as a centre-back for Premier League club Tottenham Hotspur.

Adarabioyo started his professional career with Manchester City making his senior debut in 2016 after progressing through the club's youth ranks. He later became the then-youngest-ever player to start a UEFA Champions League match for the club and ultimately made eight appearances across all competitions before loan spells at West Bromwich Albion and Blackburn Rovers. He joined Fulham on a permanent deal in July 2020.

Adarabioyo is a former England youth international and represented the country on 14 occasions between the under-16 and under-19 levels, although he is yet to make his senior debut for England. He also remains eligible to represent Nigeria through descent.

== Club career ==
=== Manchester City ===
==== Early life and career ====
Born at St Mary's Hospital in Paddington, London, to Nigerian parents of Yoruba origin, but raised in Manchester, Adarabioyo grew up in Whalley Range and attended Chorlton High School and St Bede's College. His football career started at the age of five when he joined the youth system at Manchester City after he was spotted by the club's head of recruitment, Terry John, at a local five-a-side tournament. He briefly trained with cross-town rivals Manchester United and Blackburn Rovers but elected to remain with City, where he rapidly progressed through the youth ranks during his formative years. When he was 14 years old, he broke into the U18 team and was captaining the side less than two years later, when he also began training with the first team, and wore the armband in City's 5–2 aggregate defeat to Chelsea in the 2014–15 FA Youth Cup final.

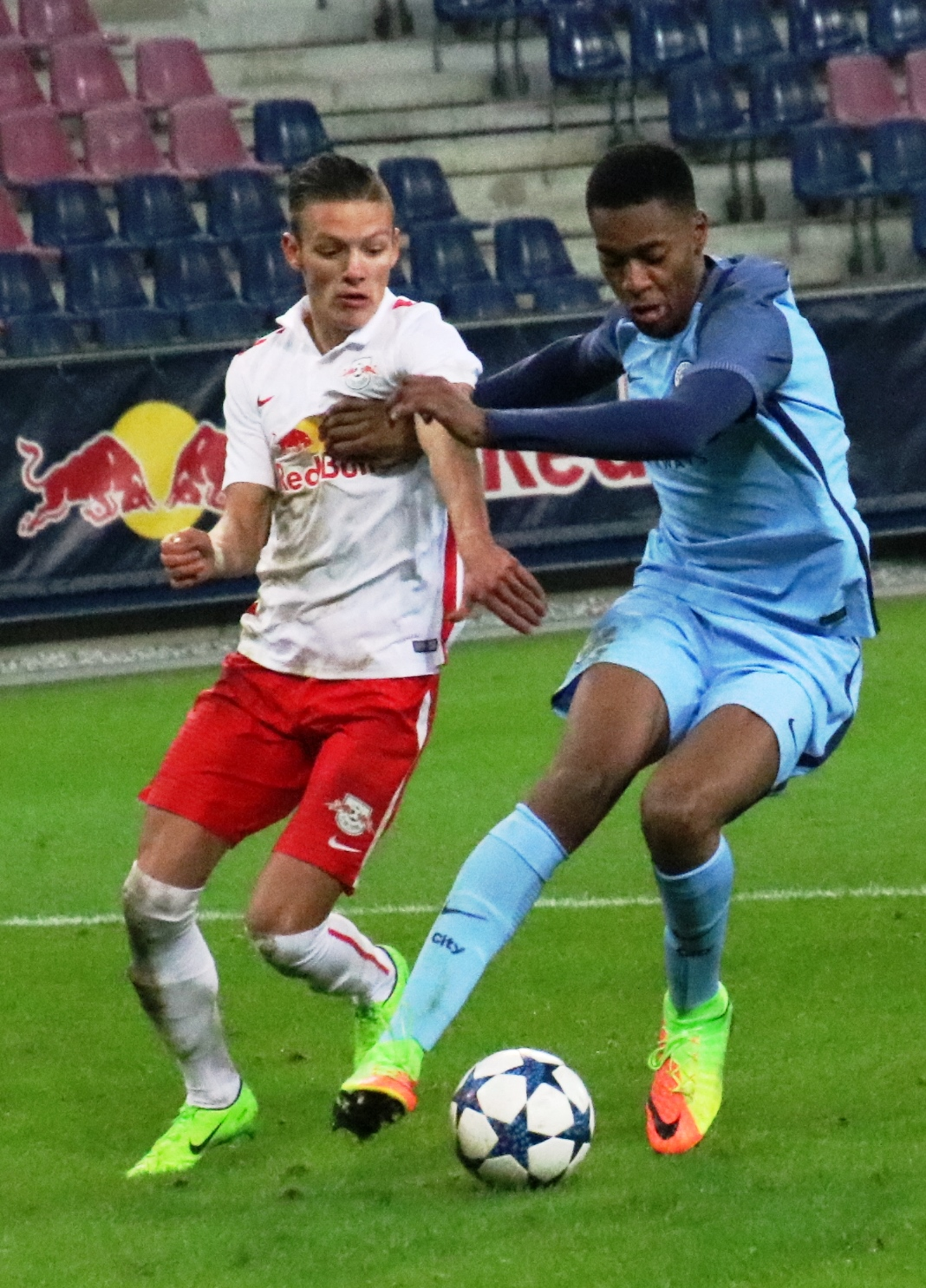
Adarabioyo (right) playing for Manchester City in the UEFA Youth League in 2017.

His form at youth level saw him called-up to the first team during the 2015–16 campaign and he appeared as an unused substitute for the first time for two UEFA Champions League matches against Juventus and Borussia Mönchengladbach. Adarabioyo's senior debut followed on 21 February 2016 when was named in a young starting XI by Manuel Pellegrini for City's FA Cup match against Chelsea, and he was lauded for a strong performance in marking opposition striker Diego Costa despite his side suffering a 5–1 defeat.

Ahead of the 2016–17 season, and following the appointment of Pep Guardiola as Pellegrini's replacement, Adarabioyo was linked a move away from City amid reports of interest from Celtic and Tottenham Hotspur. He ultimately remained with the club and was praised by Guardiola for his performances during the pre-season, which resulted in him being definitively promoted to the first team. He made his Champions League debut as a substitute for John Stones in a 1–0 play-off round win over Steaua București on 24 August 2016, before becoming the then-youngest player to start a match in the competition for the club later that year, at the age of 19 years and 73 days. He also made his League Cup debut during the campaign in which he featured three times in total, earning a contract extension at the end of the season.

The 2017–18 season saw Adarabioyo continue to feature in both the first team and the reserve team but his game time with the senior side was largely limited by City's depth in defence, which included the presence of captain Vincent Kompany, Stones, Nicolás Otamendi, Eliaquim Mangala and new recruit, Aymeric Laporte. It wasn't until 24 October 2017 when he made his first appearance of the season against Wolverhampton Wanderers in the fourth round of the League Cup, where Manchester City won 4–1 in the penalty shoot-out following a 0–0 draw. Adarabioyo later made three more appearances, bringing up his overall tally for the campaign to four across all competitions, before joining Championship side West Bromwich Albion on loan ahead of the 2018–19 season.

==== Loan to West Bromwich Albion ====
"It feels very strange considering the amount of time I've been at Manchester City [but] I think it's the time in my career where I need to play as many games as I can. The challenge of the Championship is playing two games a week so it's about adapting to that [...] Darren Moore was a big part of my decision. He's a great guy. I can't wait to start working under him. In terms of his personality, how he comes across and his history of being a centre-half, I think I can learn a lot from him."

— Adarabioyo explaining the reason behind his decision to join West Bromwich Albion on loan from Manchester City.

On 3 August 2018, Adarabioyo joined Championship side West Brom on a season-long loan and made his debut for the club four days later when he started in the right-back position in a 1–1 draw against Nottingham Forest. Although ordinarily a centre-back by trade, he was largely deployed on the right flank after a formation change by club manager Darren Moore and initially struggled in the unfamiliar role in the following weeks. However, after losing and reclaiming his spot in the starting lineup, he developed into one of West Brom's more consistent performers by the turn of the year and was praised by Moore for showing "versatility, adaptability and an understanding of the game". In the new year, Mason Holgate arrived on a short-term deal from Everton which allowed Adarabioyo to return to his preferred position, where he predominantly featured for the remainder of the season as West Brom narrowly missed out on promotion to the Premier League.

Adarabioyo ultimately made 36 appearances across all competitions for the campaign, which included a substitutes' showing in the second leg of the Championship play-offs against Aston Villa. In that match, he entered the field of play in place of Jacob Murphy as a late, defensive reinforcement after Chris Brunt was dismissed just minutes before. He played the remainder of the encounter and successfully converted his club's third penalty in an eventual 4–3 penalty shoot-out defeat after the tie had ended in a 2–2 aggregate scoreline. Following the conclusion of the campaign, he returned to his parent club before embarking on a subsequent loan spell at fellow Championship side Blackburn Rovers.

==== Loan to Blackburn Rovers ====
Ahead of the 2019–20 season, Adarabioyo joined Blackburn on loan for the remainder of the campaign and made his debut for the club in a 2–0 loss against Fulham the following month. After an injury-enforced absence from the squad, he soon established himself in the first team where he formed a defensive partnership alongside Derrick Williams, Ryan Nyambe and Darragh Lenihan, and he scored his first senior career goal in Blackburn's 2–1 win over Sheffield Wednesday in November. His impressive performances during the first half of the season led to suggestions that he would return to Manchester City in January, with his parent club enduring an injury-crisis at the time, but Guardiola ultimately elected to employ midfielder Fernandinho as defensive cover rather than recall Adaraioyo.

Instead, he remained at Ewood Park and continued to feature as a first-team regular, and by the time the season was suspended because of the COVID-19 pandemic in March he had made 27 league appearances for the campaign. With the competition later resuming behind closed doors, he extended his loan spell with the club until the revised end of the season and made his 50th career appearance against Barnsley in June. Immediately prior to that milestone, he had scored his third goal of the season with a curling effort in a 3–1 win over Bristol City, with his effort later being nominated for the club's Goal of the Season award. He ultimately made 34 appearances in the league, scoring three times and registering one assist, as Blackburn ended the campaign in 11th position in the Championship standings.

Following the conclusion of his loan, the club ultimately decided against signing Adarabioyo on a permanent basis, which manager Tony Mowbray explained was due to Blackburn being unable to afford his services: "Ultimately, we couldn't afford him, that's the first part of the question," Mowbray said. "This is why this loan system is really good because not in a million years could we afford Tosin Adarabioyo. We'll wait and see, but I'm not thinking sat here that Tosin will be starting next season with us, unless Man City do us a huge favour, of course, I'm not sure that will be the case." Prior to returning to his parent club, Adarabioyo made two separate statements, thanking the club for the experience and giving him an opportunity.

=== Fulham ===
On 5 October 2020, with a year remaining on his contract, Adarabioyo ended his 18-year association with Manchester City when he joined Premier League rivals Fulham on a permanent deal, signing a three-year deal, with a club option for an additional 12 months. While the fee was officially undisclosed, local media reported that City would receive up to £2million for the transfer, as well as the benefit of a 20 per cent sell on fee on any future sale.

At the time of Adarabioyo's arrival, newly-promoted Fulham had lost their opening four league matches of the season and he was immediately introduced into the starting XI by manager Scott Parker, where he formed a strong partnership alongside Joachim Andersen, who had joined the club on the same day in a short-term deal from Olympique Lyonnais. Over the course of the season, he made what Sky Sports described as a "seamless transition" to the Premier League and delivered a number of impressive performances, including a clean sheet in a 1–0 win over reigning champions Liverpool in March, which saw him come into contention for an England call-up.

However, he was unable to help prevent the club from suffering relegation to the Championship, which was confirmed with three matches remaining for the campaign. He scored his first goal for Fulham in a 1–1 draw with Bournemouth on 3 December 2021. In the 2021–22 season, he played a pivotal role in his team's Championship victory and immediate promotion back to the top-tier division.

Upon the conclusion of the 2023–24 season, Adarabioyo was among the players announced to be departing the club at the expiration of their contracts.

=== Chelsea ===
On 7 June 2024, it was announced that Adarabioyo would join Premier League side Chelsea on a free transfer on 1 July 2024, signing a four-year contract with the club.

On 7 November, he scored his first goal for Chelsea in an 8–0 rout of FC Noah in the UEFA Conference League. On 11 January 2025, Adarabioyo scored his first career brace in the FA Cup third round against Morecambe.

=== Tottenham Hotspur ===
On 1 September 2026, Adarabioyo joined Tottenham Hotspur from Chelsea in a £12 million deal, making him the first player since Carlo Cudicini in 2009 to transition on a permanent transfer directly between the two clubs. He signed a 4-year deal.

== International career ==
Adarabioyo is a former England youth international and represented his country of birth on 14 occasions across the various age-group levels. He made his first appearance in national team colours in November 2012 at the age of 15 when he was called-up to the England under-16 squad for the first time, making his debut as a 41st-minute substitute against Scotland as England went on to claim a 12th consecutive Victory Shield triumph. In August of the following year, Adarabioyo was called up to the England under-17 for the first time and made his debut in a 3–1 defeat to Portugal later that month. He then established himself as a squad player within the England under-18 team and made his first appearance on the day of his 17th birthday when he featured as a substitute in a 2–0 loss against Italy. In November 2015, Adarabioyo was called up to the England under-19 squad for the first time. After appearing as an unused substitute against the Netherlands, he made his England under-19 debut against Japan on 15 November 2015, starting the whole game, as the under-19 side won 5–1.

Despite featuring frequently at youth level for England, Adarabioyo is yet to make his senior debut for the national team and remains eligible to represent Nigeria through descent. He was previously reported to have turned down an approach by the Nigeria Football Federation to represent the Super Eagles but opened the door to a potential call-up in 2020 when he expressed his desires of playing at the 2022 FIFA World Cup in Qatar with either England or Nigeria.

== Style of play ==
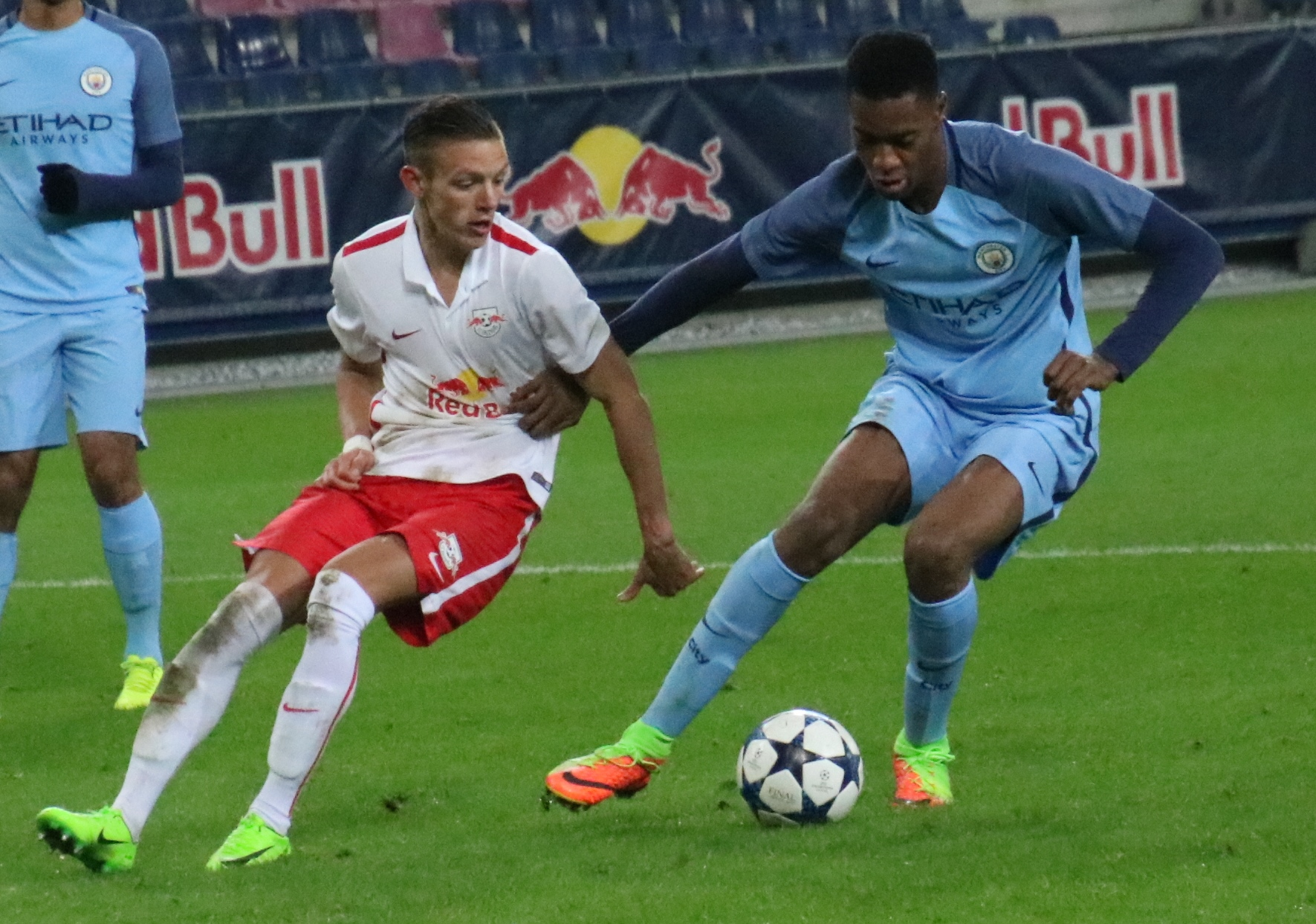
Adarabioyo, pictured during his time with Manchester City, was lauded as a ball-playing centre-back by his former manager Pep Guardiola.

Adarabioyo is an athletic ball-playing centre-back who was previously described as being "fast, strong in the air and [possessing] the quality to look forward behind the line for the next pass" by his former Manchester City manager Pep Guardiola. Standing at 6 ft 5 in, his height and physical presence have seen him emerge as a dominant defender who is adept at winning aerial duals and effecting headed clearances, while simultaneously posing as a goal threat from set-pieces in the opposition box. During the 2020–21 Premier League season, which was his first full campaign in England's top flight, Adarabioyo recorded more clearances than any other player in the division. He has also earned recognition as a player who is strong in the tackle and capable with the ball at his feet, suitable to a possession-based style of play, and boasts good positional awareness and reading of the game in defensive situations.

== Personal life ==
Adarabioyo was born in London, England to Nigerian parents and is the youngest of three brothers. His oldest brother, Gbolahan, serves as his representative while middle brother Fisayo Adarabioyo is also a footballer. All three brothers were part of Manchester City's youth ranks. After his family moved to Whalley Range when he was still an infant, Adarabioyo was schooled in Manchester and attended Chorlton High School before enrolling with St Bede's College, a college associated with Manchester City.

In December 2018, during the early years of his playing career, Adarabioyo's name was mentioned by teammate Raheem Sterling after he alleged that sections of the media served to "fuel racism" with their portrayal of young black footballers. The comments emerged after Sterling was subjected to alleged racist abuse during City's 2–0 defeat at Chelsea. Sterling wrote: "you have two young players starting out their careers, both play for the same team, both have done the right thing. Which is buy a new house for their mothers who have put in a lot of time and love into helping them get where they are, but look how the newspapers get their message across for the young black player and then for the young white player." The Daily Mail headlines had been "Young Manchester City footballer, 20, on £25,000 a week splashes out on mansion on market for £2.25 million despite having never started a Premier League match" and "Manchester City starlet Phil Foden buys new £2m home for his mum." In response to his name being mentioned, Adarabioyo said on his Instagram account: "When they try to abuse and bring us down but God has protected you from all angles. Another year of prosperity."

== Career statistics ==
As of match played 19 October 2026

Appearances and goals by club, season and competition
Club	Season	League			FA Cup		EFL Cup		Europe		Other		Total	
Club	Season	Division	Apps	Goals	Apps	Goals	Apps	Goals	Apps	Goals	Apps	Goals	Apps	Goals
Manchester City	2015–16	Premier League	0	0	1	0	0	0	0	0	—		1	0
Manchester City	2016–17	Premier League	0	0	0	0	1	0	2 (Note: Appearances in UEFA Champions League)	0	—		3	0
Manchester City	2017–18	Premier League	0	0	0	0	2	0	2	0	—		4	0
Manchester City	Total		0	0	1	0	3	0	4	0	—		8	0
West Bromwich Albion (loan)	2018–19	Championship	29	0	3	0	3	0	—		1 (Note: Appearance in Championship play-offs)	0	36	0
Blackburn Rovers (loan)	2019–20	Championship	34	3	1	0	0	0	—		—		35	3
Fulham	2020–21	Premier League	33	0	1	0	—		—		—		34	0
Fulham	2021–22	Championship	41	2	1	0	2	0	—		—		44	2
Fulham	2022–23	Premier League	25	1	4	0	0	0	—		—		29	1
Fulham	2023–24	Premier League	20	2	2	0	3	0	—		—		25	2
Fulham	Total		119	5	8	0	5	0	—		—		132	5
Chelsea	2024–25	Premier League	22	1	2	2	1	0	12 (Note: Appearances in UEFA Conference League)	1	4 (Note: Appearances in FIFA Club World Cup)	1	41	5
Chelsea	2025–26	Premier League	16	0	5	2	3	0	5	0	—		29	2
Chelsea	Total		38	1	7	4	4	0	17	1	4	1	70	7
Tottenham Hotspur	2026–27	Premier League	2	0	0	0	1	0	—		—		3	0
Career total			222	9	20	4	16	0	21	1	5	1	284	15

== Honours ==
Fulham

- EFL Championship: 2021–22

Chelsea

- UEFA Conference League: 2024–25
- FIFA Club World Cup: 2025
- FA Cup runner-up: 2025–26

Individual

- PFA Team of the Year: 2021–22 Championship
- EFL Championship Team of the Season: 2021–22 Championship
- UEFA Conference League Team of the Season: 2024–25
