= Bernardo Cueva =

Mexican association football manager (born 1987)

- Cueva with Chelsea in 2025

Personal information
- Full name: Bernardo Cueva Martínez
- Date of birth: 14 August 1987 (age 39)
- Place of birth: Guadalajara, Mexico

Team information
- Current team: Crystal Palace (first-team coach)

Bernardo Cueva Martínez (born August 14, 1987) is a Mexican professional football coach who is currently first-team coach at Premier League club Crystal Palace.

He has previously held coaching and technical staff roles at Mexican side Guadalajara, Norway's national team and Premier League clubs Brentford and Chelsea.

He is known for his innovative approach to game-plan development in elite football, particularly his designing and executing of dead-ball strategies.

Cueva holds a UEFA Pro Licence awarded by the English Football Association and was part of the coaching staff that helped Brentford return to the Premier League in 2021 after a 74-year absence before winning both the 2024–25 UEFA Conference League and the 2025 FIFA Club World Cup in his first season at Chelsea.

== Early life ==
Born in Guadalajara, Cueva has a degree in business administration and had a professional background in business and entrepreneurship prior to entering football.

His coaching career was also recognised by the Guadalajara Chamber of Commerce with the "Mexican without borders" award in 2025.

== Career ==
=== Guadalajara ===
Cueva began working across data and scouting at Guadalajara, commonly known as Chivas, in September 2017.

As Director of Sporting Intelligence until 2020, Cueva held a strategic role within the club’s football operations alongside working with the first-team coaching staff.

During his time at Guadalajara, the team won the 2018 CONCACAF Champions League and competed in the FIFA Club World Cup.

=== Brentford and Norway national team ===
Cueva joined Brentford’s coaching staff as a tactical statistician in the 2020–21 season, leading tactical-game-plan development and the design and implementation of set-piece strategies.

He was a key part of the team behind Danish football coach Thomas Frank at Brentford which won promotion from the EFL Championship to the Premier League in 2021.

Cueva also combined his responsibilities at Brentford with the Norway national team from 2021, working with the senior squad during international breaks within the coaching staff.

He left Brentford at the end of the 2023–24 season. Brentford director of football Phil Giles said after Cueva departed: "Bernardo has done a fantastic job for us over the last four seasons. His first season ended with promotion to the Premier League, and he has played a key role in us now achieving four successive Premier League seasons."

Cueva was replaced by Irish football coach Keith Andrews at Brentford.

=== Chelsea ===
Cueva joined Chelsea for the 2024–25 season following the departure of English football coach Anthony Barry, who had joined Bundesliga side Bayern Munich.

At Chelsea, Cueva has worked alongside head coaches, leading preparation and execution of tactical game plans for set pieces and restarts part of the first-team coaching staff.

During his first season at Chelsea, the club won the 2024–25 UEFA Conference League and the 2025 FIFA Club World Cup in the summer. Chelsea also managed to secure a spot for the UEFA Champions League, something the team struggled to achieve in the past two seasons. Cueva was part of the club’s coaching and technical staff during both campaigns.

=== Crystal Palace ===
On 20 November 2026, Cueva left Chelsea to join fellow Premier League club Crystal Palace as first-team coach.
