= Wesley Fofana (footballer) =

French footballer (born 2000)

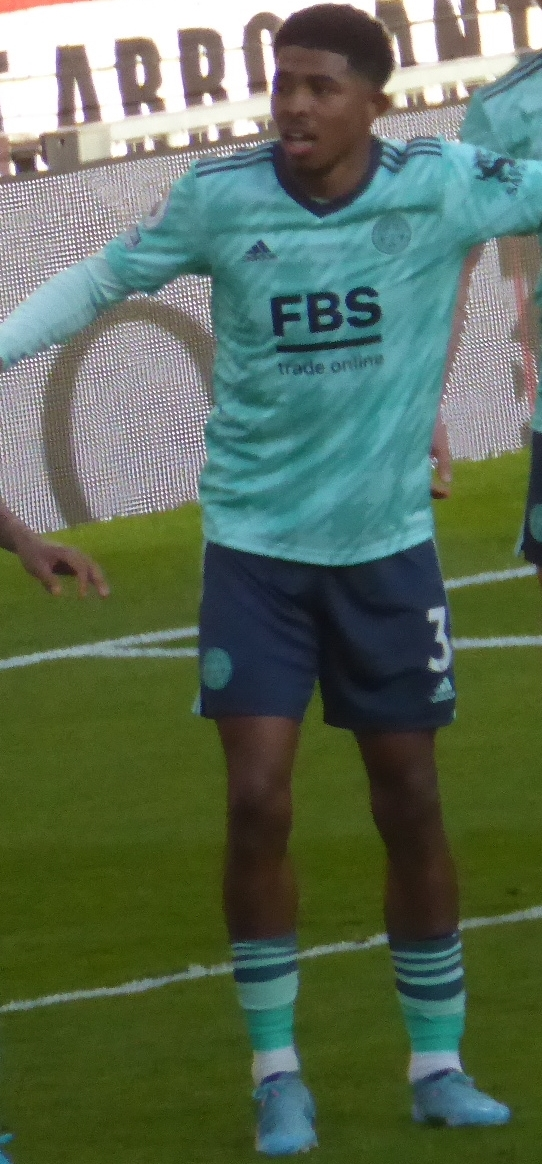
- Fofana playing for Leicester City in 2022

Personal information
- Full name: Wesley Tidjan Fofana
- Date of birth: 17 December 2000 (age 25)
- Place of birth: Marseille, France
- Height: 1.85 m (6 ft 1 in)
- Position: Centre-back

Team information
- Current team: Chelsea
- Number: 3

Youth career
- 2006–2008: Repos Vitrolles
- 2008–2010: Bassin Minier
- 2010–2011: Pennes Mirabeau
- 2011–2015: Bel Air
- 2015–2018: Saint-Étienne

Senior career*
Years	Team	Apps	(Gls)
2018–2019	Saint-Étienne II	11	(0)
2019–2020	Saint-Étienne	20	(1)
2020–2022	Leicester City	37	(0)
2022–	Chelsea	61	(1)

International career
2018	France U19	1	(0)
2020–2022	France U21	7	(0)
2023	France	1	(0)
- * Club domestic league appearances and goals as of 17:30, 21 November 2026 (UTC)

Wesley Tidjan Fofana (born 17 December 2000) is a French professional footballer who plays as a centre-back for Premier League club Chelsea.

== Early and personal life ==
Fofana was born in Marseille, Bouches-du-Rhône, France. His father is Ivorian, whereas his mother is French. One of six children, he started playing football at the age of six playing for Repos Vitrolles.

Fofana is Muslim. On 22 April 2021, he was substituted on the hour mark during Leicester's 3–0 win against West Bromwich Albion, while Fofana was daytime fasting for the month of the Muslim Ramadan. In the next match against Crystal Palace, the game was paused after the half-hour mark for Fofana and Cheikhou Kouyaté to have some fluids to end their fast.

Fofana showed his support for the Palestinians after winning the 2021 English FA Cup Final by waving a large flag of Palestine, along with fellow Leicester City teammate Hamza Choudhury, during their team celebrations that took place amidst the 2021 Palestinian-Israeli clashes in May 2021.

In May 2025, he was banned from driving for two years after being found guilty of 8 counts of dangerous driving. In November 2025, Fofana received a further 18 month community order including 300 hours of community service. At that point, Fofana had 47 points on his licence.

== Club career ==
=== Saint-Étienne ===
Having been in the youth system since 2015, Fofana signed his first professional contract with Saint-Étienne on 15 May 2018. He made his debut for the club in a 3–0 league win over Nice on 18 May 2019.

=== Leicester City ===
Fofana joined English Premier League club Leicester City on 2 October 2020, signing a five-year contract. The transfer fee paid to Saint-Étienne was reported as up to £36.5 million. On 15 May 2021, he played in the 2021 FA Cup Final, which Leicester won 1–0 for his first career honour in England. He and teammate Hamza Choudhury both celebrated draped in the flag of Palestine, during the 2021 Israel–Palestine crisis.

On 21 May 2021, Fofana won Leicester City's Young Player of the Season award after being voted by the club's supporters.

On 4 August 2021, during a pre-season friendly against Villarreal, Fofana suffered a broken leg following a challenge by Fer Niño. On 17 March 2022, Fofana played his first match since his injury, scoring in a 2–1 defeat to Rennes in the UEFA Europa Conference League, which secured Leicester's progress to the next round on a 3–2 aggregate score.

=== Chelsea ===
On 31 August 2022, Fofana joined Premier League club Chelsea on a seven-year contract for a reported initial fee of £70 million, plus £5 million in add-ons. After signing for Chelsea, Fofana criticised his former club Leicester City, accusing them of issuing "false and misleading comments" during his protracted transfer. On 3 September, he made his debut for the club in a 2–1 win at home against West Ham United in the Premier League. He scored his first goal for Chelsea on 5 October in a Champions League 3–0 victory against AC Milan at Stamford Bridge, but suffered a major knee injury after 38 minutes, forcing him to be substituted off, and was ruled out until February 2023.

Fofana returned from injury on 18 February 2023, in a 1–0 home defeat against Southampton. He scored his first ever Premier League goal against Leeds United on 4 March, in a 1–0 home victory. On 18 July 2023, Chelsea revealed that Fofana had suffered an anterior cruciate ligament injury (ACL) and had undergone a surgery. In late November 2023, it was announced that Fofana had been cleared to resume training following his recovery from the ACL injury. However, he was unable to feature in any match during the 2023–24 season due to his injury.

On 21 February 2026, Fofana was shown a second yellow card after the foul he made on James Ward-Prowse in the 1–1 home draw against Burnley. This made him the sixth Chelsea player to be sent off in the Premier League that season. During the final game against Sunderland on 24 May, Fofana was sent off for the second time this season for a foul he made on Wilson Isidor. In his absence, Chelsea went on to lose 2–1 and miss out on Europe for the first time in three years.

== International career ==
In March 2023, Fofana received his first call-up to the France senior national team for the UEFA Euro 2024 qualifying matches against the Netherlands and the Republic of Ireland. However, he was forced to withdraw from the squad due to injury. He made his debut three months later in a 3–0 victory over Gibraltar.

== Career statistics ==
=== Club ===
As of match played 21 November 2026

Appearances and goals by club, season and competition
Club	Season	League			National cup (Note: Includes Coupe de France, FA Cup)		League cup (Note: Includes Coupe de la Ligue, EFL Cup)		Europe		Other		Total	
Club	Season	Division	Apps	Goals	Apps	Goals	Apps	Goals	Apps	Goals	Apps	Goals	Apps	Goals
Saint-Étienne	2018–19	Ligue 1	2	0	0	0	0	0	—		—		2	0
Saint-Étienne	2019–20	Ligue 1	14	1	6	1	2	0	2 (Note: Appearances in UEFA Europa League)	0	—		24	2
Saint-Étienne	2020–21	Ligue 1	4	0	—		—		—		—		4	0
Saint-Étienne	Total		20	1	6	1	2	0	2	0	—		30	2
Leicester City	2020–21	Premier League	28	0	4	0	0	0	6	0	—		38	0
Leicester City	2021–22	Premier League	7	0	0	0	0	0	5 (Note: Appearances in UEFA Europa Conference League)	1	0	0	12	1
Leicester City	2022–23	Premier League	2	0	—		—		—		—		2	0
Leicester City	Total		37	0	4	0	0	0	11	1	—		52	1
Chelsea	2022–23	Premier League	15	1	0	0	0	0	5 (Note: Appearances in UEFA Champions League)	1	—		20	2
Chelsea	2023–24	Premier League	0	0	0	0	0	0	—		—		0	0
Chelsea	2024–25	Premier League	14	0	0	0	0	0	0	0	0	0	14	0
Chelsea	2025–26	Premier League	25	0	4	0	3	0	6	0	—		38	0
Chelsea	2026–27	Premier League	7	0	0	0	2	0	—		—		9	0
Chelsea	Total		61	1	4	0	5	0	11	1	0	0	81	2
Career total			118	2	14	1	7	0	24	2	0	0	163	5

=== International ===
As of match played 16 June 2023

Appearances and goals by national team and year
National team	Year	Apps	Goals
France	2023	1	0
Total		1	0

== Honours ==
Saint-Étienne

- Coupe de France runner-up: 2019–20

Leicester City

- FA Cup: 2020–21

Chelsea

- UEFA Conference League: 2024–25
- FA Cup runner-up: 2025–26

Individual

- IFFHS Men's World Youth (U20) Team: 2020
