= Calum McFarlane =

English football manager (born 1985)

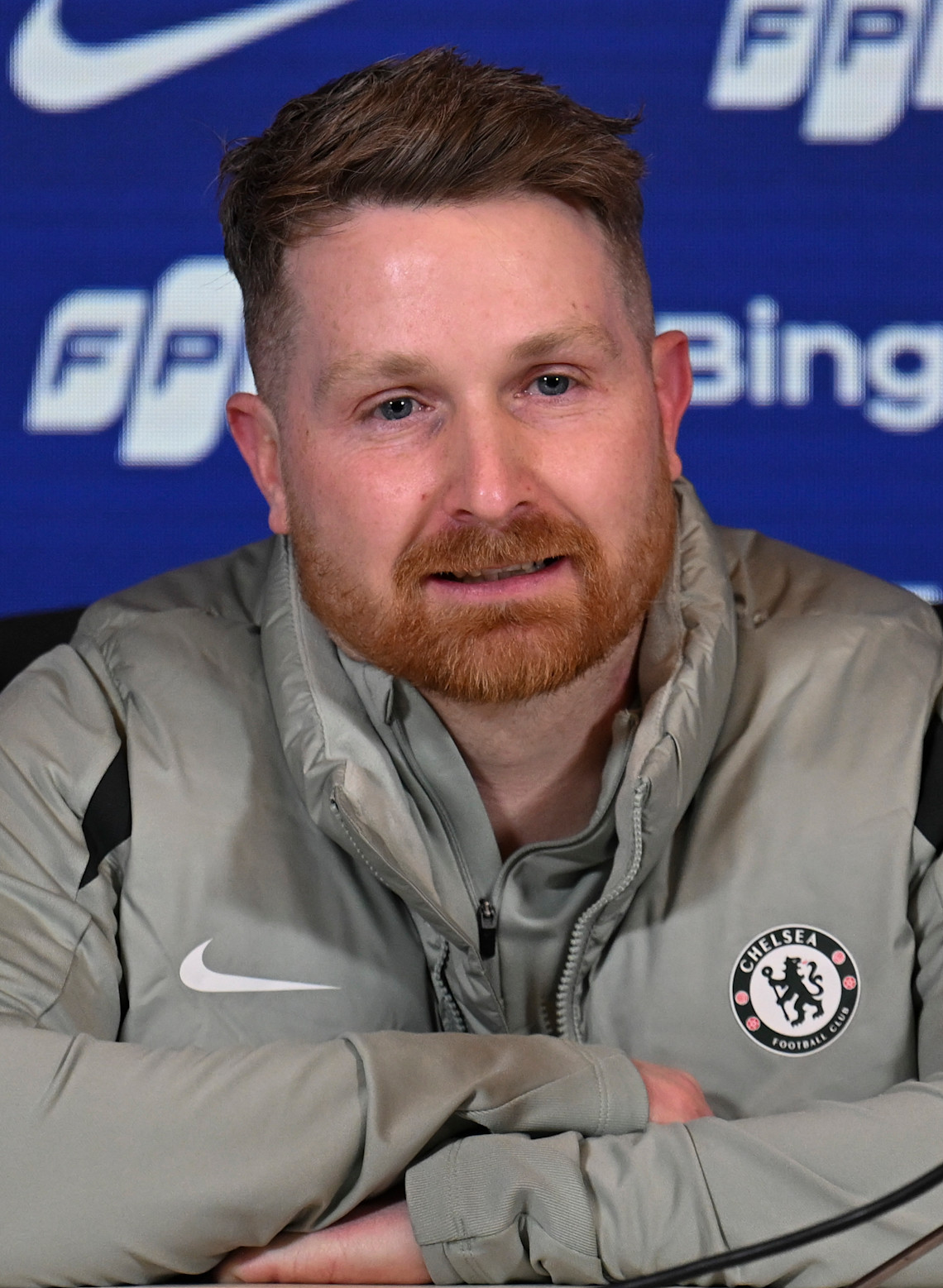
- McFarlane in 2026

Personal information
- Full name: Calum McFarlane
- Date of birth: 13 November 1985 (age 40)
- Place of birth: England

Team information
- Current team: Chelsea (assistant)

Managerial career
- Years: Team
- 2026: Chelsea (caretaker)
- 2026: Chelsea (caretaker)

Calum McFarlane (born 13 November 1985) is an English professional football coach who is the current assistant coach of Premier League club Chelsea.

Prior to his time at Chelsea, McFarlane held assistant manager positions at non-league sides Croydon and Whyteleafe as well as youth team positions at Manchester City and Southampton.

== Managerial career ==
=== Croydon ===
McFarlane was assistant manager of non-league side Croydon.

=== Whyteleafe ===
In 2018, Croydon first team head coach Harry Hudson departed for Whyteleafe, taking McFarlane with him.

=== Manchester City ===
In 2020, Whyteleafe announced that McFarlane would be departing for Manchester City. He served an assistant role in the Manchester City Academy until 2023.

=== Southampton ===
McFarlane left City to join the Southampton Academy, leading the Under-18s until 2025. In February 2025, he became head coach of the club's Under-21s.

=== Chelsea ===
McFarlane departed Southampton in July 2025 when he became the coach of Chelsea's Under-21s, while also leading the Under-19s during their 2025–26 UEFA Youth League campaign.

On 2 January 2026, a day after first team manager Enzo Maresca left Chelsea by mutual consent, McFarlane became the interim manager of the club ahead of their Premier League fixture against Manchester City, resulting in a 1–1 draw. On 6 January, Chelsea named Liam Rosenior as their full-time manager. However, McFarlane remained in charge of Chelsea's league match against Fulham.

On 8 January 2026, it was announced that McFarlane would join the backroom staff of new head coach Liam Rosenior. When Rosenior was dismissed on 22 April 2026, McFarlane was once again promoted to interim head coach until the end of the season.

On 26 April 2026, McFarlane achieved his first win as Chelsea manager, guiding the club to a 1–0 win over Leeds United in the FA Cup semi-final. He thus became the first English manager to reach the FA Cup final since Frank Lampard in 2020, also with Chelsea. McFarlane's Chelsea side were defeated 1–0 by Manchester City in the FA Cup Final.

Following Xabi Alonso's appointment on 1 July 2026, McFarlane stayed as part of his coaching staff.

== Managerial statistics ==
As of 1 June 2026

Managerial record by team and tenure
Team	From	To	Record							
Team	From	To	G	W	D	L	GF	GA	GD	Win %
Chelsea (caretaker)	1 January 2026	8 January 2026	2	0	1	1	2	3	−1	0.00
Chelsea (caretaker)	22 April 2026	1 June 2026	6	2	1	3	6	8	−2	33.33
Career Total			8	2	2	4	8	11	−3	25.00

== Honours ==
Chelsea

- FA Cup runner-up: 2025–26
