= Brodi Hughes =

English footballer

Personal information
- Date of birth: 16 October 2004 (age 22)
- Place of birth: Winchester, England
- Position: Centre-back

Youth career
- 2012–2025: Chelsea

Senior career*
Years	Team	Apps	(Gls)
2025–2026	Chelsea	0	(0)
2025–2026	→ AFC Wimbledon (loan)	0	(0)

International career^{‡}
2019–2020	England U16	9	(0)
2021–2022	England U18	6	(0)
- * Club domestic league appearances and goals as of 17:09, 6 May 2026 (UTC) ‡ National team caps and goals as of 1 July 2023

Brodi Hughes (born 16 October 2004) is an English footballer who plays as a full-back.

== Early life ==
Brodi Hughes was born on 16 October 2004 in Winchester, England.

He attended the John Hanson Community School in Andover, Hampshire.

== Club career ==
Hughes joined Chelsea at the age of eight, playing as a centre-back, left-back, right-back, and as a right wing-back. He also captained the John Hanson Community School football team.

Hughes signed his scholar agreement with Chelsea Academy in July 2021. He started training with the first-team in September 2022. Two months later, Hughes signed his first professional contract, keeping him contracted to the club until 2025.

On 29 August 2025, Hughes joined League One club AFC Wimbledon on a season-long loan. He departed Chelsea following the conclusion of 2025–26 season.

== International career ==
Hughes has represented England at under-16 and under-18 level.

== Career statistics ==
=== Club ===
As of 16 September 2025

Appearances and goals by club, season and competition
Club	Season	League			FA Cup		EFL Cup		Europe		Other		Total	
Club	Season	Division	Apps	Goals	Apps	Goals	Apps	Goals	Apps	Goals	Apps	Goals	Apps	Goals
Chelsea U21	2021–22	—			—		—		—		3 (Note: Appearances in the EFL Trophy)	0	3	0
Chelsea U21	2022–23	—			—		—		—		0	0	0	0
Chelsea U21	2023–24	—			—		—		—		3	0	3	0
Chelsea U21	2024–25	—			—		—		—		3	0	3	0
Chelsea U21	Total		0	0	0	0	0	0	0	0	9	0	9	0
AFC Wimbledon (loan)	2025–26	League One	0	0	0	0	0	0	0	0	2	0	2	0
Career total			0	0	0	0	0	0	0	0	11	0	11	0
