= Chico =

Chico (Spanish pronunciation: [ˈtʃiko]) means small, boy or child in the Spanish language. It is also the nickname for Francisco in the Portuguese language (Portuguese pronunciation: [ˈʃiku]).

Chico may refer to:

== Places ==
- Chico, California, a city
- Chico, Montana, an unincorporated community
- Chico, Texas, a town
- Chico, Washington, a census designated place
- Chico Creek, Colorado
- Chico Formation, a Mesozoic geologic formation in the US
- Chico River (disambiguation)
- Río Chico (disambiguation)
- Ch'iqu, or Volcán Chico, a volcano in Bolivia

== People ==
=== Nickname ===
- Alfred "Chico" Alvarez (1920–1992), Canadian trumpeter
- Chico Anysio (1931–2012), Brazilian actor, comedian, writer and composer
- Chico Bouchikhi (born 1954), musician and a co-founder of the Gipsy Kings, later leader of Chico & the Gypsies
- Chico Buarque (born 1944), Brazilian singer, guitarist, composer, dramatist, writer and poet
- Chico (footballer, born 1922), Brazilian footballer Francisco Aramburu
- Chico (footballer, born 1981), Portuguese footballer Francisco José Castro Fernandes
- Chico (footballer, born February 1987), Brazilian footballer Luis Francisco Grando
- Chico (footballer, born 1988), Portuguese footballer Francisco Miguel Franco Antunes Gomes
- Chico (footballer, born 1991), Angolan footballer Carlos Francisco Diassonama Panzo
- Chico (footballer, born 1993), Brazilian footballer Francisco Hyun-sol Kim
- Chico (footballer, born 1995), Brazilian footballer Francisco Da Costa Aragao
- Chico (footballer, born 1998), Brazilian footballer Francisco Alves da Silva Neto
- Chico Carrasquel (1926–2005), Venezuelan baseball player
- Chico César (born 1964), Brazilian singer, composer and songwriter
- Diego Corrales (1977–2007), American professional boxer
- Chico DeBarge (born 1966), American R&B singer
- Chico Díaz (born 1959), Mexican-born Brazilian actor
- Chico Faria (1949–2004), Portuguese footballer
- Chico Flores (born March 1987), Spanish footballer José Manuel Flores Moreno
- Chico Freeman (born 1949), American jazz musician
- Chico Hamilton (1921–2013), American jazz drummer and bandleader
- Ian Hamilton (footballer, born 1950), English former footballer
- Chico Heron (1936–2007), Panamanian baseball player and manager
- Chico Hopkins (born 1946), Welsh rugby player
- Francisco "Chico" Lachowski (born 1991), Brazilian model
- Chico Maki (1939–2015), Canadian National Hockey League player
- Chico Marx (1887–1961), American comedian, actor, pianist and bandleader, member of the Marx Brothers, born Leonard Marx
- Chico Mendes (1944–1988), Brazilian rubber tapper, trade union leader and environmentalist. See also Chico Té below.
- Chico Netto (1894–1959), Brazilian footballer
- Washington "Chico" Oliveira (born 1977), half of the Chico & Roberta Brazilian song and dance duo
- Chico Resch (born 1948), Canadian retired National Hockey League goaltender and television sportscaster
- Eduardo Rózsa-Flores (1960–2009), Bolivian-Hungarian soldier, journalist, actor and secret agent
- Chico Salmon (1940–2000), Major League Baseball utility player from Panama
- Chico Serra (born 1957), Brazilian Formula One race car driver
- Chico Slimani (born 1971), British singer
- Chico Walker (born 1957), American former Major League Baseball catcher
- Chico Xavier (1910–2002), Brazilian spiritist medium

=== Surname ===
- Gery Chico (born 1956), American lawyer and politician
- Moraíto Chico II (1956–2011), Spanish Flamenco guitarist
- Mariano Chico (1796–1850), governor of Alta California, Mexico, in 1836
- Matt Chico (born 1983), American former baseball pitcher

=== Other people ===
- Chico Álvarez (singer), American Latin jazz musician, Ernesto Peraza
- Chico Té, nom de guerre of Francisco Mendes (1939–1978), politician and first prime minister of Guinea-Bissau
- Chico Lanete (born 1979), Philippine Basketball Association player
- Chico Science, stage name of Brazilian singer and composer Francisco de Assis França (1966–1997)
- Bryan Alvarez (born 1975), American newsletter editor and professional wrestler under the ring name Chico Alvarez
- Gabriel Campillo (born 1978), Spanish professional boxer known as "Chico Guapo"

== Entertainment ==
- Chico Escuela, a recurring character played by Garrett Morris on Saturday Night Live
- Chuck Billy (Chuck Billy 'n' Folks), a character created by Mauricio de Sousa and called Chico Bento in Portuguese
- Chico, a main character in Chico and the Man, a 1970s American television sitcom
- Chico (film), a 2001 film starring Eduardo Rózsa-Flores, based on his life
- Chico (album), a 1977 album by Chico Freeman
- "Chico", a 2004 song by Brant Bjork from the album Local Angel
- "Chico" (Luísa Sonza song), 2023

== Other ==
- Chico (Amtrak station), a railroad station in Chico, California
- Chico (cat), a cat who is the narrator of an authorised biography of Pope Benedict XVI
- CHICO (construction company), a Chinese construction company based in Henan
- Chico language
- Chico Senior High School, Chico, California
- California State University, Chico
- Volkswagen Chico, a 1992 concept car
- Cheekies, formerly Chicos, an Australian confectionery
- Operation Chico, a 1958 Civil Defense exercise in California

== See also ==
- Chico's (disambiguation)
- Chica (disambiguation)
- El Chico (disambiguation)
- Chicão (disambiguation)
- Chicoo, an alternate name for the tree Sapodilla
- Chiko Roll, an Australian savoury snack, inspired by the Chinese egg roll and spring rolls
