= Messi Cup =

2025 youth football tournament

2025 Messi Cup
Tournament details
- Country: United States
- Cities: Miami, Florida
- Venue: Inter Miami CF Stadium
- Date: 9–14 December

Final positions
- Champions: (Argentina) River Plate
- Runners-up: (Spain) Atlético Madrid
- Semifinalists: (England) Chelsea; (England) Manchester City

Tournament statistics
- Matches played: 18
- Top goal scorer: (Argentina) Bruno Cabral (7)

Awards
- Best player: (Argentina) Bruno Cabral
- Best goalkeeper: (Argentina) Estéfano Sarro

The Messi Cup is an international youth football tournament of a friendly nature. It brings together eight clubs from its academies with the aim of developing young players. The tournament is named after the Argentine footballer Lionel Messi.

The first edition was held in 2025 in the United States.

== History ==
In October 2025, Lionel Messi posted the tournament logo on Instagram, adding: "I can finally tell you that a very special tournament for young talents is coming to Miami in December, with several of the best clubs in the world. And there will also be many more activities during those days. I hope you like it!"

The company 525 Rosario, founded by Messi, announced the launch of the first edition of the Messi Cup. The inaugural edition was held in Miami.

Messi inaugurated the cup in the rain. He regretted that the rain had forced a change of plans for the inauguration, as the idea was for the players to accompany him during his MVP reception after winning the MLS Cup against the Vancouver Whitecaps.

== Format ==
Eight clubs from around the world participate and are divided into two groups. Each team plays a minimum of three matches against others in their group. The top two teams from each group advance to the knockout stage, or semifinals, to determine the champion. The final, as well as the third-place match, is played on the last day at Chase Stadium. Each match consists of two 40-minute halves.

== Participating teams ==
=== Group A ===
- (England) Chelsea (classified)
- (Spain) Atlético Madrid (classified)
- (United States) Inter Miami
- (Argentina) Newell's Old Boys

=== Group B ===
- (England) Manchester City (classified)
- (Argentina) River Plate (classified)
- (Spain) Barcelona
- (Italy) Inter Milán

== Group Stage ==
=== Group A ===
9 December 2025 Group stage	Chelsea (England)	4–2	(Spain) Atlético Madrid
	Sambou 16'; Grimwade 37'; Watson 46'; Ayinde 53'		Serrano 27'; Obarrio 79'

9 December 2025 Group stage	Inter Miami (United States)	4–0	(Argentina) Newell's Old Boys
	Leandro Padilla 3'; Nicolas Pineros 8'; Zidane Cadet 32', 72'

10 December 2025 Group stage	Newell's Old Boys (Argentina)	3–3	(England) Chelsea
	Ciro Quizás 36'; Iane Romero 52', 59'		Heze Grimwade 17'; Trey Faromo-Adebayo 51'; Watson 80+13' (pen.)

10 December 2025 Group stage	Inter Miami (United States)	0–1	(Spain) Atlético Madrid
			Julen Sánchez 17'

11 December 2025 Group stage	Chelsea (England)	4–1	(United States) Inter Miami
	Nicoll-Jazuli 20'; Heze Grimwade 35'; Andrew Pennie 60' (pen.); Bilal Shah 80+5'		Zidane Cadet 56'

11 December 2025 Group stage	Atlético Madrid (Spain)	2–2	(Argentina) Newell's Old Boys
	Alexandru Grigorii 41'; Mauro Silva 48'		Benjamín Gómez 47'; Bautista Arévalo 55'

=== Group B ===
9 December 2025 Group stage	Barcelona (Spain)	2–2	(Argentina) River Plate
	Ruslan Mba 34'; Ahmed Abarkane 80'		Bruno Cabral 60' (pen.); Joaquín Amor 63'

9 December 2025 Group stage	Manchester City (England)	3–0	(Italy) Inter Milán
	David Eze 39'; Raphael Aiyegbusi 49'; Xavier Parker 60'

10 December 2025 Group stage	River Plate (Argentina)	1–2	(England) Manchester City
	F. Lopéz 4'		X. Parker 58'; A. Thorton 66'

10 December 2025 Group stage	Inter Milán (Italy)	0–3	(Spain) Barcelona
			Ignasi Bassas 18'; Ruslan Mba 48', 67'

11 December 2025 Group stage	River Plate (Argentina)	5–1	(Italy) Inter Milán
	Bruno Cabral 5', 25', 72'; Elián Suljic 15'; Joaquín Amor 45'		Tom Keqi 42'

11 December 2025 Group stage	Manchester City (England)	3–1	(Spain) Barcelona
	Marlow Barrett 28'; Ahmed Abarkane 35' (o.g.); Caelan Cadamarteri 84'; David Eze (yellow card) 76' (red card) 80+2'		Luca Perez 56'

== Knockout stages ==
=== 7th place match ===
13 December 2025	Newell's Old Boys (Argentina)	1–1 (3–1 p)	(Italy) Inter Milán
	Iani Romero 41'		Giovanni Rubortone 12' (o.g.)
	Penalties
	Romero (penalty missed); Rubortone (penalty scored); Contreras (penalty scored); Díaz (penalty scored)		(penalty missed) Ferri; (penalty scored) Omini; (penalty missed) Lucarelli; (penalty missed) Keqi

=== 5th place match ===
13 December 2025	Inter Miami (United States)	4–6	(Spain) Barcelona
	Zidane Cadet 27', 43'; Leandro Padilla 63'; Nicolas Piñeros 65'		Ruslan Mba 6'; Alejandro Fernández 40'; Ahmed Abarkane 53'; Artem Rybak 18', 70', 79'

=== Semi-finals ===
13 December 2025 2025 Messi Cup Semi-finals	Chelsea (England)	1–3	(Argentina) River Plate
	Watson 40+1' (pen.)		Valentín Sayago 18'; Ramiro Álvarez 41'; Bruno Cabral 61'

13 December 2025 2025 Messi Cup Semi-finals	Manchester City (England)	2–3	(Spain) Atlético Madrid
	Archie Thornton 18'; Xavier Parker 40+1'		Alexandru Grigorii 8'; Aitor Pérez 36'; Daniel Serrano 76'

=== Third place match ===
14 December 2025	Chelsea (England)	1–2	(England) Manchester City
	Trey Faromo-Adebayo 40+1'		Raphael Aiyegbusi 19', 33'

=== Final ===
14 December 2025 2025 Messi Cup Final	River Plate (Argentina)	2–0	(Spain) Atlético Madrid	Miami, Florida
18:00 ART (UTC-03:00)	Bruno Cabral 28', 30'; Valentín Sayago (yellow card) 13' (red card) 43'	Report		Stadium: Chase Stadium; Referee: (United States) Jorge Escobar; Man of the Match: Bruno Cabral
