= Estêvão Willian =

Brazilian footballer (born 2007)

Estêvão
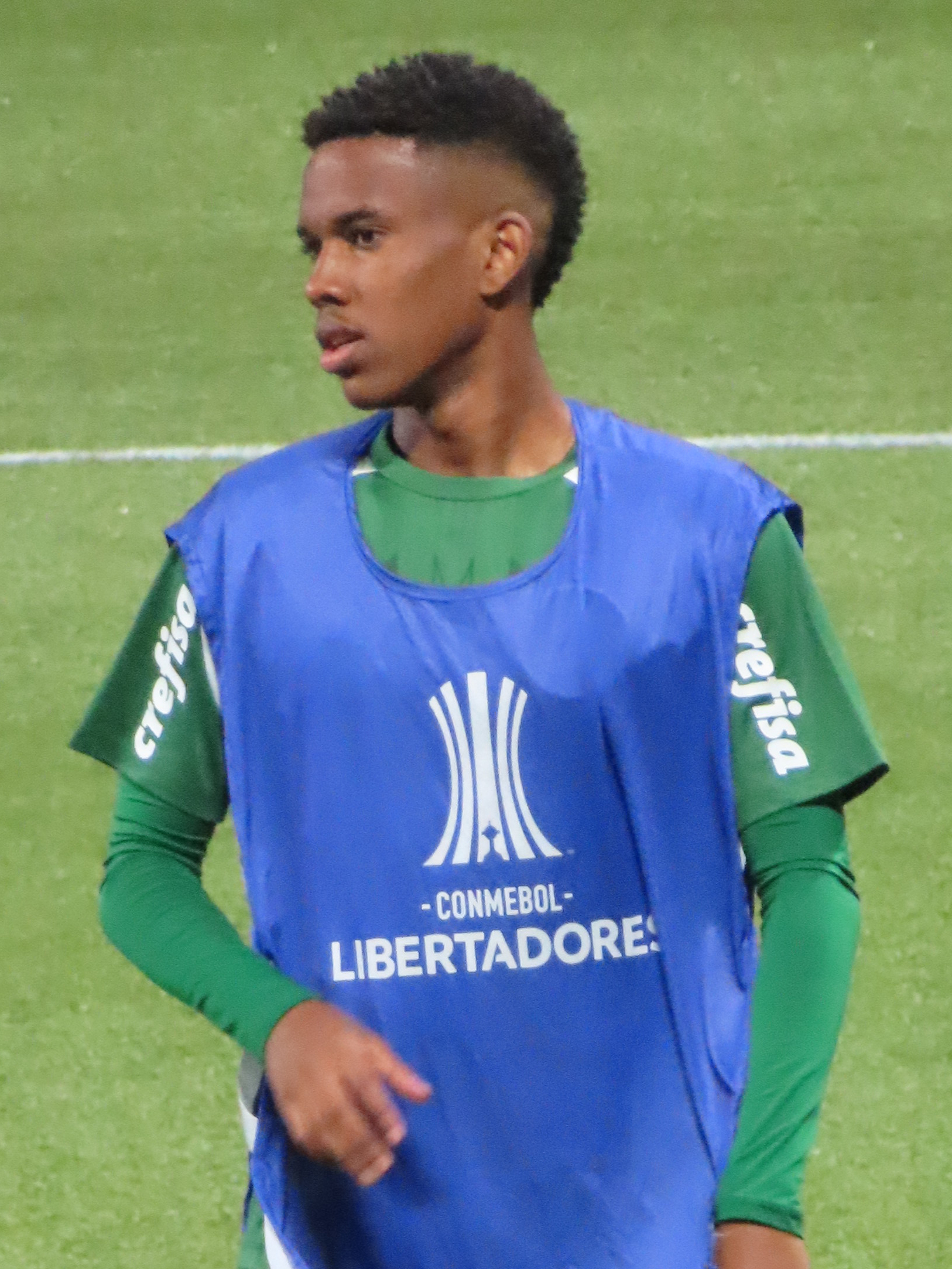
- Estêvão with Palmeiras in 2024

Personal information
- Full name: Estêvão Willian Almeida de Oliveira Gonçalves
- Date of birth: 24 April 2007 (age 19)
- Place of birth: Franca, São Paulo, Brazil
- Height: 1.78 m (5 ft 10 in)
- Position: Winger

Team information
- Current team: Chelsea
- Number: 41

Youth career
- 2017–2021: Cruzeiro
- 2021–2024: Palmeiras

Senior career*
Years	Team	Apps	(Gls)
2023–2025	Palmeiras	62	(18)
2025–	Chelsea	31	(2)

International career^{‡}
2023	Brazil U17	5	(3)
2024–	Brazil	16	(7)
- * Club domestic league appearances and goals as of 17:40, 21 November 2026 (UTC) ‡ National team caps and goals as of 12:42, 17 November 2026 (UTC)

Estêvão Willian Almeida de Oliveira Gonçalves (born 24 April 2007), known as Estêvão (Brazilian Portuguese pronunciation: [isˈte.vɐ̃w̃]), is a Brazilian professional footballer who plays as a winger for Premier League club Chelsea and the Brazil national team. He is widely regarded as one of the best young players in the world.

== Early life ==
Born in Franca, São Paulo, Estêvão began his youth career with Cruzeiro in 2017 where his prodigious ability earned him the nickname "Messinho". At the age of 10, Estêvão signed a deal with Nike, making him the then youngest athlete to sign with the company before being surpassed by Kauan Basile.

== Club career ==
=== Palmeiras ===
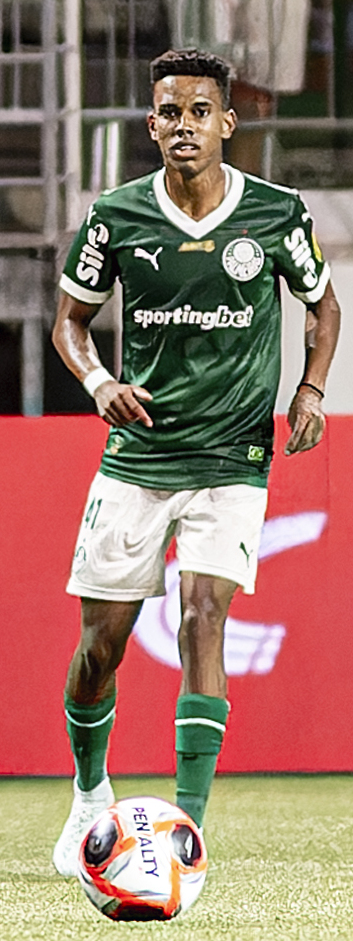
Estêvão playing for Palmeiras in 2025

Estêvão moved to the youth academy of Palmeiras on 6 May 2021, signing a trainee contract. In the 2022 season, he helped the Palmeiras youth teams win the Campeonato Paulista Sub-17 Campeonato Paulista de Futebol Sub-17, Campeonato Paulista Sub-15 Campeonato Paulista de Futebol Sub-15, Copa do Brasil Sub-17 and Campeonato Brasileiro Sub-17. In October 2023, Estêvão scored a hat-trick in the Campeonato Brasileiro Sub-17 final which ended in a 3–0 victory against São Paulo, helping his club to achieve their second consecutive title in the competition.

On 7 December 2023, Estêvão made his professional debut for Palmeiras, coming off the bench in the 78th minute of a 1–1 draw away at Cruzeiro which sealed the Série A title win for Palmeiras. At 16 years and 8 months, he became the club's fourth youngest player ever.

Estêvão returned to the Palmeiras U-20 team for the Copinha 2024, and emerged as a standout in the tournament and an important player for his team.. On 12 April 2024, he scored his first goal for Palmeiras in a 3–1 win over Liverpool during the 2024 Copa Libertadores group stage, becoming the third player under 17 to achieve this feat following Ângelo Gabriel and Endrick.

On 4 July 2025, Estêvão played his final game for Palmeiras in the quarter-finals of the 2025 FIFA Club World Cup, facing the very team he was set to join, Chelsea. He scored the equaliser against his future club, though Palmeiras were ultimately eliminated.

=== Chelsea ===
On 22 June 2024, Premier League club Chelsea announced that Estêvão would join the club in the summer of 2025, on his eighteenth birthday. The deal reportedly commanded a €34 million fee, plus €23 million in performances-based incentives. Estêvão was unveiled 14 months later by Chelsea on 5 August 2025, the player opting to keep the number 41 which he wore during his time at Palmeiras.

On 17 August 2025, he made his debut for Chelsea in a goalless draw against Crystal Palace at Stamford Bridge coming on as a substitute for Jamie Gittens. On 22 August, he made his first start for Chelsea in a 5–1 win against West Ham United, providing an assist for Enzo Fernández. On 4 October, he scored his first goal for Chelsea with a composed 95th-minute finish in a 2–1 victory over rivals Liverpool at Stamford Bridge, turning in Marc Cucurella's cross after fine interplay with Enzo Fernández. The goal, described by The Athletic as "a stunning late winner" that condemned the reigning champions to a third straight defeat, was hailed by Chelsea supporters as an early glimpse of his exceptional composure on the biggest stage. Later that month, on 22 October, he scored his first UEFA Champions League goal from a penalty in a 5–1 victory over Ajax, becoming the youngest Chelsea player to score in the competition at 18 years and 181 days old. Later that year, on 25 November, he scored a goal in a 3–0 victory over Barcelona, becoming the third teenager to score in each of his first three Champions League starts, only behind Kylian Mbappé and Erling Haaland.

On 18 April 2026, during a 0–1 home defeat to Manchester United at Stamford Bridge, he suffered a serious hamstring injury and left the match in the 16th minute, which led to him being unavailable to represent Brazil at the 2026 FIFA World Cup.

== International career ==
Estêvão was first called up to represent the Brazil U17s in October 2022 for a set of friendlies in October 2022. He was selected for the Brazil national team for the first time on 23 August 2024, to participate in the 2026 FIFA World Cup qualification against Ecuador and the Paraguay. He debuted on 6 September 2024 against Ecuador at the Estádio Couto Pereira, substituting Luiz Henrique in the 61st minute as Brazil won 1–0.

On 4 September 2025, during 2026 FIFA World Cup qualification, Estêvão scored his first international goal in Brazil's 3–0 win against Chile.

== Style of play ==
Estêvão has been compared to Lionel Messi and Neymar. When Estêvão was in the youth of Cruzeiro, he was given the nickname Messinho due to the similar playing style with Messi. He has also been praised for his maturity, his reading of the game and his decision making, which were all considered to be precocious.

== Career statistics ==
=== Club ===
As of match played 21 November 2026

Appearances and goals by club, season and competition
Club	Season	League			State league (Note: Includes Campeonato Paulista)		National cup (Note: Includes Copa do Brasil, FA Cup)		League cup (Note: Includes EFL Cup)		Continental		Other		Total	
Club	Season	Division	Apps	Goals	Apps	Goals	Apps	Goals	Apps	Goals	Apps	Goals	Apps	Goals	Apps	Goals
Palmeiras	2023	Série A	1	0	0	0	0	0	—		0	0	0	0	1	0
Palmeiras	2024	Série A	31	13	5	0	2	1	—		7 (Note: Appearances in Copa Libertadores)	1	0	0	45	15
Palmeiras	2025	Série A	11	0	14	5	2	2	—		5	4	5 (Note: Appearances in FIFA Club World Cup)	1	37	12
Palmeiras	Total		43	13	19	5	4	3	—		12	5	5	1	83	27
Chelsea	2025–26	Premier League	22	2	—		3	2	4	1	7 (Note: Appearances in UEFA Champions League)	3	—		36	8
Chelsea	2026–27	Premier League	9	0	—		0	0	2	0	—		—		11	0
Chelsea	Total		31	2	—		3	2	6	1	7	3	—		47	8
Career total			74	15	19	5	7	5	6	1	19	8	5	1	130	35

=== International ===
As of match played 17 November 2026

Appearances and goals by national team and year
National team	Year	Apps	Goals
Brazil	2024	4	0
Brazil	2025	7	5
Brazil	2026	5	2
Total		16	7

As of match played 17 November 2026
Scores and results list Brazil's goal tally first, score column indicates score after each Estêvão goal.

List of international goals scored by Estêvão
No.	Date	Venue	Cap	Opponent	Score	Result	Competition
1	4 September 2025	Estádio do Maracanã, Rio de Janeiro, Brazil	6	Chile	1–0	3–0	2026 FIFA World Cup qualification
2	10 October 2025	Seoul World Cup Stadium, Seoul, South Korea	8	South Korea	1–0	5–0	Friendly
3	10 October 2025	Seoul World Cup Stadium, Seoul, South Korea	8	South Korea	3–0	5–0	Friendly
4	15 November 2025	Emirates Stadium, London, England	10	Senegal	1–0	2–0	Friendly
5	18 November 2025	Stade Pierre-Mauroy, Lille, France	11	Tunisia	1–1	1–1	Friendly
6	3 October 2026	Salt Lake Stadium, Kolkata, India	14	India	1–0	4–0	Friendly
7	17 November 2026	National Stadium, Kallang, Singapore	16	Singapore	5–0	7–0	Friendly

== Honours ==
Palmeiras

- Campeonato Brasileiro Série A: 2023
- Campeonato Paulista: 2024

Chelsea

- FA Cup runner-up: 2025–26

Individual

- Campeonato Brasileiro Série A Best Newcomer: 2024
- Campeonato Brasileiro Série A Team of the Year: 2024
- Bola de Ouro: 2024
- Troféu Mesa Redonda Best Player: 2024
- London Football Awards Men’s Young Player of the Year: 2026
