= 2026–27 Chelsea F.C. season =

English football club season

Chelsea
2026–27 season
- Owner: BlueCo
- Chairman: Todd Boehly (until 16 September 2026)
- Manager: Xabi Alonso
- Stadium: Stamford Bridge
- Premier League: 5th
- FA Cup: Third round
- EFL Cup: Fourth round
- Top goalscorer: League: João Pedro; Morgan Rogers (5 each); All: Morgan Rogers (6)
- Highest home attendance: 39,767 vs Bournemouth, 10 October 2026, Premier League
- Lowest home attendance: 32,210 vs Luton Town, 27 August 2026, EFL Cup
- Average home league attendance: 39,504
- Biggest win: 5–1 vs Bournemouth (H), 10 October 2026, Premier League
- Biggest defeat: 0–3 vs Brentford (A), 18 September 2026, Premier League
Home colours	Away colours	Third colours

The 2026–27 season is the 121st season in the history of Chelsea Football Club, and their 35th consecutive season in the Premier League as well as their 38th consecutive season in the English top flight. In addition to the domestic league, the club is also participating in the FA Cup and the EFL Cup.

== Kits ==
Home	Home alt. 1	Away	Away alt. 1	Third	Third alt. 1

== Management team ==
Prior to the season starting, Xabi Alonso was appointed as the new manager on a four-year contract.

Position	Name
Manager	(Spain) Xabi Alonso
Assistant manager	(Argentina) Sebastian Parrilla
Assistant coaches	(Spain) Alberto Encinas
Assistant coaches	(England) Calum McFarlane
Set-piece coach	(Scotland) Austin MacPhee
Strength and conditioning coach	(Spain) Ismael Camenforte
Technical coach	(Spain) Beñat Labaien
Head of global goalkeeping	(England) Ben Roberts
Technical analyst	(Mexico) Bernardo Cueva

Source: Chelsea F.C.

== Squad information ==
Players and squad numbers last updated on 21 November 2026. Appearances include all competitions.

Note: Flags indicate national team as has been defined under FIFA eligibility rules. Players may hold more than one non-FIFA nationality.

No.	Player	Nat.	Positions	Date of birth (age)	Place of birth	Signed in	Contract ends	Signed from	Transfer fee	Apps.	Goals
Goalkeepers
1	Emiliano Martínez (HG)	(Argentina)	GK	2 September 1992 (age 34)	(Argentina) Mar del Plata	2026	2029	(England) Aston Villa	£7.5m	7	0
28	Teddy Sharman-Lowe (HG)	(England)	GK	30 March 2003 (age 23)	(England) Leicester	2020	2028	(England) Burton Albion	Undisclosed	0	0
39	Mike Penders (U21)	(Belgium)	GK	31 July 2005 (age 21)	(Belgium) Maasmechelen	2025	2032	(Belgium) Genk	£17m	7	0
44	Gabriel Slonina (HG)	(United States)	GK	12 May 2004 (age 22)	(United States) Addison	2022	2028	(United States) Chicago Fire	£8.1m	0	0
Defenders
2	Marco Palestra (U21)	(Italy)	RB	3 March 2005 (age 21)	(Italy) Buccinasco	2026	2033	(Italy) Atalanta	£43m	6	0
3	Wesley Fofana	(France)	CB	17 December 2000 (age 25)	(France) Marseille	2022	2029	(England) Leicester City	£70m	81	2
5	Maxence Lacroix	(France)	CB	6 April 2000 (age 26)	(France) Villeneuve-Saint-Georges	2026	2032	(England) Crystal Palace	£52m	11	0
6	Levi Colwill (HG)	(England)	CB	26 February 2003 (age 23)	(England) Southampton	2021	2029	Academy		91	3
21	Jorrel Hato (U21)	(Netherlands)	LB	7 March 2006 (age 20)	(Netherlands) Rotterdam	2025	2032	(Netherlands) Ajax	£35.5m (Note: Initial £35.5 million plus £3 million in possible add-ons)	43	2
24	Reece James (captain) (HG)	(England)	RB	8 December 1999 (age 26)	(England) Redbridge	2018	2032	Academy		235	16
27	Malo Gusto	(France)	RB	19 May 2003 (age 23)	(France) Décines-Charpieu	2023	2030	(France) Lyon	£26.3m (Note: Initial £26.3 million plus £4.4 million in possible add-ons)	145	3
29	Pep Chavarría	(Spain)	LB	10 April 1998 (age 28)	(Spain) Figueres	2026	2031	(Spain) Rayo Vallecano	£16.3m (Note: Initial £16.3 million plus £1.7 million in possible add-ons)	11	0
30	Aarón Anselmino (U21)	(Argentina)	CB	29 April 2005 (age 21)	(Argentina) Bernardo Larroudé	2024	2031	(Argentina) Boca Juniors	£15.6m	1	0
34	Josh Acheampong (U21, HG)	(England)	RB / CB	5 May 2006 (age 20)	(England) Waltham Forest	2024	2029	Academy		56	2
37	Olutayo Subuloye (U21)	(England)	CB	18 December 2007 (age 18)	(England) Eastbourne	2026	2030	Academy		0	0
Midfielders
4	Valentín Barco	(Argentina)	CM	23 July 2004 (age 22)	(Argentina) Veinticinco de Mayo	2026	2033	(France) Strasbourg	£34m	7	1
10	Cole Palmer (HG)	(England)	AM / RW	6 May 2002 (age 24)	(England) Manchester	2023	2034	(England) Manchester City	£40m	144	59
14	Jordan Henderson (HG)	(England)	CM	17 June 1990 (age 36)	(England) Sunderland	2026	2028	(England) Brentford	Free	7	2
17	Morgan Rogers (HG)	(England)	AM / LW	26 July 2002 (age 24)	(England) Halesowen	2026	2033	(England) Aston Villa	£117m	14	6
25	Moisés Caicedo	(Ecuador)	DM	2 November 2001 (age 25)	(Ecuador) Santo Domingo	2023	2033	(England) Brighton & Hove Albion	£100m (Note: Initial £100 million plus £15 million in possible add-ons)	156	8
31	Reggie Watson (U21)	(England)	CM	26 January 2010 (age 16)	(England) Bromley	2026	2028	Academy		1	0
32	Mahdi Nicoll-Jazuli (U21)	(England)	CM	6 January 2010 (age 16)	(Australia) Sydney	2026	2028	Academy		1	0
45	Roméo Lavia (HG)	(Belgium)	DM	6 January 2004 (age 22)	(Belgium) Brussels	2023	2030	(England) Southampton	£53m (Note: Initial £53 million plus £5 million in possible add-ons)	54	1
Forwards
7	Pedro Neto	(Portugal)	RW / LW	9 March 2000 (age 26)	(Portugal) Viana do Castelo	2024	2032	(England) Wolverhampton Wanderers	£51.3m (Note: Initial £51.3 million plus £2.6 million in possible add-ons)	117	23
9	João Pedro (HG)	(Brazil)	ST	26 September 2001 (age 25)	(Brazil) Ribeirão Preto	2025	2034	(England) Brighton & Hove Albion	£55m (Note: Initial £55 million plus £5 million in possible add-ons)	60	28
11	Jamie Gittens (HG)	(England)	LW / RW	4 August 2004 (age 22)	(England) Reading	2025	2032	(Germany) Borussia Dortmund	£48.5m (Note: Initial £48.5 million plus £3.5 million in possible add-ons)	29	1
18	Danny Welbeck (HG)	(England)	ST	26 November 1990 (age 35)	(England) Manchester	2026	2028	(England) Brighton & Hove Albion	£5m	12	3
22	Emmanuel Emegha	(Netherlands)	ST	3 February 2003 (age 23)	(Netherlands) The Hague	2026	2033	(France) Strasbourg	£22m	3	1
23	Geovany Quenda (U21)	(Portugal)	RW	30 April 2007 (age 19)	(Guinea-Bissau) Bissau	2026	2034	(Portugal) Sporting CP	£40m	7	0
41	Estêvão (U21)	(Brazil)	RW	24 April 2007 (age 19)	(Brazil) Franca	2025	2033	(Brazil) Palmeiras	£29m (Note: Initial £29 million plus £20 million in possible add-ons)	47	8

Notes:

- Player (HG) – Player who fulfills the Premier League's "Home Grown Player" criteria
- Player (U21) – Under-21 player who is eligible in addition to the Premier League 25-man squad limit

=== Out on loan ===
Player	Nat.	Positions	Date of birth (age)	Place of birth	Signed in	Contract ends	Signed from	Transfer fee	Apps.	Goals
Genesis Antwi (U21, HG)	(Sweden)	RB	11 May 2007 (age 19)	(Sweden) Stockholm	2025	2028	Academy		2	0
Benoît Badiashile	(France)	CB	26 March 2001 (age 25)	(France) Limoges	2023	2030	(France) Monaco	£35m	71	2
Ted Curd (U21)	(England)	GK	14 February 2006 (age 20)	(England) Kingston upon Thames	2023	2028	Academy		0	0
Jesse Derry (U21, HG)	(England)	LW	30 June 2007 (age 19)	(England) Harrogate	2025	2032	Academy		3	0
Axel Disasi	(France)	CB	11 March 1998 (age 28)	(France) Gonesse	2023	2029	(France) Monaco	£38.8m	61	5
Kiano Dyer (U21)	(England)	CM	12 November 2006 (age 20)	(England) Sutton Coldfield	2024	2030	Academy		1	0
Landon Emenalo (U21)	(England)	LB	18 January 2008 (age 18)	(United States) Tuscon	2026	2031	Academy		0	0
Dário Essugo	(Portugal)	DM	14 March 2005 (age 21)	(Portugal) Odivelas	2025	2033	(Portugal) Sporting CP	£18m	8	0
Alejandro Garnacho	(Argentina)	LW / RW	1 July 2004 (age 22)	(Spain) Madrid	2025	2032	(England) Manchester United	£40m	43	8
Ollie Harrison (U21)	(England)	DM	7 August 2007 (age 19)	(England) Gateshead	2026	2029	Academy		0	0
Filip Jörgensen	(Denmark)	GK	16 April 2002 (age 24)	(Sweden) Lomma	2024	2031	(Spain) Villarreal	£20.7m	36	0
Ryan Kavuma-McQueen (U21, HG)	(England)	LW	1 January 2009 (age 17)	(England) White City	2026	2028	Academy		1	0
Max Merrick (U21)	(England)	GK	10 November 2005 (age 21)	(England) High Wycombe	2023	2028	Academy		0	0
Shim Mheuka (U21, HG)	(England)	ST	20 October 2007 (age 19)	(England) Birmingham	2024	2027	Academy		9	0
Mykhailo Mudryk	(Ukraine)	LW	5 January 2001 (age 25)	(Ukraine) Berestyn	2023	2031	(Ukraine) Shakhtar Donetsk	£62m (Note: Initial £62 million plus £27 million in possible add-ons)	73	10
Harrison Murray-Campbell (U21)	(England)	CB	4 August 2006 (age 20)	(England) Luton	2024	2027	Academy		1	0
Dujuan Richards (U21)	(Jamaica)	ST	10 November 2005 (age 21)	(Jamaica) Port Royal	2026	2027	Academy		0	0
Ishé Samuels-Smith (U21, HG)	(England)	LB	5 June 2006 (age 20)	(England) Manchester	2025	2031	(France) Strasbourg	£6.5m	0	0
Hudson Sands (U21)	(England)	GK	20 October 2007 (age 19)	(England) Portsmouth	2026	2029	Academy		0	0
Mamadou Sarr (U21)	(Senegal)	CB	29 August 2005 (age 21)	(France) Martigues	2025	2033	(France) Strasbourg	£11.8m	7	0
Dastan Satpayev (U21)	(Kazakhstan)	ST	12 August 2008 (age 18)	(Kazakhstan) Almaty	2026	2033	(Kazakhstan) Kairat	£3.4m	0	0
Robert Sánchez	(Spain)	GK	18 November 1997 (age 29)	(Spain) Cartagena	2023	2030	(England) Brighton & Hove Albion	£25m	112	0
Shaun Wade	(Republic of Ireland)	LW	29 September 2006 (age 20)	(England) Bristol	2026	2027	Academy		0	0
Reggie Walsh (U21)	(England)	CM	20 October 2008 (age 18)	(England) London	2025	2028	Academy		4	0
Caleb Wiley	(United States)	LB	22 December 2004 (age 21)	(United States) Atlanta	2024	2030	(United States) Atlanta United	£8.5m	0	0
Kaiden Wilson (U21)	(England)	CB	2 September 2005 (age 21)	(England) Bristol	2026	2027	Academy		0	0

Notes:

- Player (HG) – Player who fulfills the Premier League's "Home Grown Player" criteria
- Player (U21) – Under-21 player who is eligible in addition to the Premier League 25-man squad limit

== New contracts ==
Date	No.	Pos.	Player	Until	Ref.
1 June 2026		CB	(Republic of Ireland) Justin Osagie	30 June 2029	
7 July 2026		CB	(England) Dante Waite	Undisclosed (Note: First professional contract)	
8 July 2026		LW	(England) Jesse Derry	30 June 2032	
8 July 2026		DM	(England) Charlie Holland	Undisclosed	
21 July 2026		RW	(England) Sol Gordon	30 June 2029	
23 July 2026		GK	(England) Toby Bell	Undisclosed	
24 July 2026		DM	(England) Ollie Harrison	30 June 2029	
31 July 2026		GK	(England) Hudson Sands	30 June 2029	
17 August 2026		ST	(England) Jashayde Greenwood	Undisclosed	
22 August 2026	9	ST	(Brazil) João Pedro	30 June 2034	
2 September 2026		ST	(England) Shim Mheuka	30 June 2031	
11 September 2026	7	RW	(Portugal) Pedro Neto	30 June 2032	
9 October 2026		DM	(England) Jayden Malundama	Undisclosed	
10 October 2026	10	AM	(England) Cole Palmer	30 June 2034	
23 October 2026		GK	(England) Freddy Bernal	30 June 2029	
26 October 2026	62	ST	(England) Chizaram Ezenwata	30 June 2029	
30 October 2026		RW	(England) Kobe Barbour	30 June 2030	
12 November 2026		GK	(England) Isaac Collinson	Undisclosed	
12 November 2026		ST	(England) Andrew Pennie	Undisclosed	

== Transfers ==
=== In ===
==== Summer ====
Date	Pos.	Player	From	Fee	Ref.
First team
1 July 2026	RB	(Italy) Marco Palestra	(Italy) Atalanta	£43,000,000	
1 July 2026 (Note: Completed on 12 September 2025 and became official in Summer 2026)	ST	(Netherlands) Emmanuel Emegha	(France) Strasbourg	£22,000,000	
8 July 2026	RW	(Portugal) Geovany Quenda	(Portugal) Sporting CP	£40,000,000	
21 July 2026	AM	(England) Morgan Rogers	(England) Aston Villa	£117,000,000	
30 July 2026	CB	(France) Maxence Lacroix	(England) Crystal Palace	£52,000,000	
1 August 2026	ST	(England) Danny Welbeck	(England) Brighton & Hove Albion	£5,000,000	
2 August 2026	CM	(Argentina) Valentín Barco	(France) Strasbourg	£34,000,000	
3 August 2026	CM	(England) Jordan Henderson	(England) Brentford	Free	
12 August 2026	LB	(Spain) Pep Chavarría	(Spain) Rayo Vallecano	£16,300,000 (Note: Initial £16,300,000 plus £1,700,000 in possible add-ons)	
14 August 2026	ST	(Kazakhstan) Dastan Satpayev	(Kazakhstan) Kairat	£3,400,000	
30 August 2026	GK	(Argentina) Emiliano Martínez	(England) Aston Villa	£7,500,000	
Academy
23 July 2026	AM	(England) Harrison Bettoni	(England) Wigan Athletic	Training compensation	
19 August 2026	CB	(Scotland) Alfie Osborne	(Scotland) Heart of Midlothian	Training compensation	
3 September 2026	LB	(Brazil) Denner	(Brazil) Corinthians	£8,600,000 (Note: Initial £8,600,000 plus £3,440,000 in possible add-ons)	
29 September 2026	DM	(England) Leo Black	Free agent		

=== Out ===
==== Summer ====
Date	Pos.	Player	To	Fee	Ref.
First team
1 July 2026 (Note: Completed on 15 June 2026 and became official on 1 July 2026 with opening of La Liga transfer window)	LB	(Spain) Marc Cucurella	(Spain) Real Madrid	£47,500,000 (Note: Initial £47,500,000 plus £4,300,000 in possible add-ons)	
6 July 2026	RW	(England) Tyrique George	(England) Everton	£18,000,000 (Note: Initial £18,000,000 plus £6,000,000 in possible add-ons)	
13 July 2026	CM	(Brazil) Andrey Santos	(England) Manchester United	£48,000,000 (Note: Initial £48,000,000 plus £2,000,000 in possible add-ons)	
9 August 2026	CB	(England) Trevoh Chalobah	(Italy) Como	£25,700,000 (Note: Initial £25,700,000 plus £5,100,000 in possible add-ons)	
27 August 2026	ST	(England) Liam Delap	(England) Nottingham Forest	£45,000,000 (Note: Initial £45,000,000 plus £5,000,000 in possible add-ons)	
28 August 2026	ST	(Senegal) Nicolas Jackson	(England) Aston Villa	£47,500,000 (Note: Initial £47,500,000 plus £17,500,000 in possible add-ons)	
31 August 2026	ST	(Ivory Coast) David Datro Fofana	(Switzerland) Servette	£2,100,000 (Note: Initial £2,100,000 plus £856,000 in possible add-ons)	
1 September 2026	CB	(England) Tosin Adarabioyo	(England) Tottenham Hotspur	£10,000,000 (Note: Initial £10,000,000 plus £2,000,000 in possible add-ons)	
1 September 2026	CM	(Argentina) Enzo Fernández	(England) Manchester City	£125,000,000	
1 September 2026	ST	(Spain) Marc Guiu	(Germany) RB Leipzig	£14,600,000	
Academy
18 June 2026	ST	(England) Jimmy-Jay Morgan	(England) West Bromwich Albion	£4,000,000	
1 July 2026	GK	(England) James Hillson	Unattached		
1 July 2026	CB	(England) Brodi Hughes	Unattached		
1 July 2026	RB	(England) Richard Olise	Unattached		
1 July 2026	CM	(England) Samuel Rak-Sakyi	Unattached		
1 July 2026	AM	(England) Frankie Runham	(England) Ipswich Town	Undisclosed	
1 July 2026	AM	(Finland) Jimi Tauriainen	(Denmark) Horsens (Note: Released on 1 July 2026, Tauriainen joined Horsens on 5 July 2026)	Free	
2 July 2026	RB	(England) Joseph Wheeler-Henry	(England) Brentford	Undisclosed	
17 July 2026	RW	(Republic of Ireland) Christopher Atherton	(England) Ipswich Town	Undisclosed	
25 August 2026	LW	(England) Jeremiah Berkeley-Agyepong	(England) Reading	Undisclosed	
25 August 2026	AM	(England) Omari Kellyman	(France) Strasbourg	£5,100,000	
1 September 2026	ST	(Brazil) Deivid Washington	(France) Strasbourg	£6,860,000	

=== Loaned out ===
==== Summer ====
Date	Pos.	Player	To	Loaned until	Fee	Ref.
First team
23 July 2026	LW	(Argentina) Alejandro Garnacho	(England) Aston Villa	End of season	Free	
11 August 2026	GK	(Denmark) Filip Jörgensen	(France) Strasbourg	End of season	Free	
14 August 2026	ST	(Kazakhstan) Dastan Satpayev	(England) Burnley	End of season	Free	
22 August 2026	CB	(France) Benoît Badiashile	(Italy) Napoli	End of season	£3,400,000	
26 August 2026	CB	(France) Axel Disasi	(England) Crystal Palace	End of season	Free	
28 August 2026	CB	(Senegal) Mamadou Sarr	(Spain) Real Sociedad	End of season	Free	
28 August 2026	LB	(United States) Caleb Wiley	(England) Preston North End	End of season	Free	
1 September 2026	DM	(Portugal) Dário Essugo	(France) Strasbourg	End of season	Free	
1 September 2026	LW	(Ukraine) Mykhailo Mudryk	(England) Tottenham Hotspur	End of season	Free	
1 September 2026	GK	(Spain) Robert Sánchez	(Italy) Como	End of season	Free	
Academy
10 July 2026	CB	(England) Harrison Murray-Campbell	(Belgium) Kortrijk	End of season	Free	
11 July 2026	LW	(England) Jesse Derry	(Portugal) Sporting CP	End of season	Free	
17 July 2026	CB	(England) Kaiden Wilson	(England) Rochdale	End of season	Free	
25 July 2026	GK	(England) Max Merrick	(England) Hartlepool United	End of season	Free	
31 July 2026	GK	(England) Hudson Sands	(England) Dulwich Hamlet	End of season	Free	
31 July 2026	DM	(England) Ollie Harrison	(England) AFC Wimbledon	End of season	Free	
3 August 2026	RB	(Sweden) Genesis Antwi	(France) Strasbourg	End of season	Free	
11 August 2026	LB	(England) Ishe Samuels-Smith	(England) Notts County	End of season	Free	
14 August 2026	LW	(England) Ryan Kavuma-McQueen	(England) Portsmouth	End of season	Free	
19 August 2026	AM	(England) Reggie Walsh	(England) Wigan Athletic	End of season	Free	
1 September 2026	ST	(Jamaica) Dujuan Richards	(England) AFC Wimbledon	End of season	Free	
2 September 2026	ST	(England) Kiano Dyer	(England) Chesterfield	End of season	Free	
2 September 2026	LB	(England) Landon Emenalo	(Scotland) Celtic	End of season	Free	
2 September 2026	ST	(England) Shim Mheuka	(Scotland) Celtic	End of season	Free	
3 September 2026	GK	(England) Ted Curd	(England) Boreham Wood	End of season	Free	
24 October 2026	LW	(Republic of Ireland) Shaun Wade	(England) Dulwich Hamlet	End of season	Free	

=== Loaned return ===
Date	Pos.	Player	From	Ref.
First team
28 August 2026	RW	(Ecuador) Kendry Páez	(Argentina) River Plate	

=== Overall transfer activity ===
==== Expenditure ====
Summer: ▼£348,800,000

Total: ▼£348,800,000

==== Income ====
Summer: ▲£402,760,000

Total: ▲£402,760,000

==== Net totals ====
Summer: ▲£53,960,000

Total: ▲£53,960,000

== Pre-season and friendlies ==
On 7 December 2025, the club announced they would take part in the 2026 Sydney Super Cup with matches against Western Sydney Wanderers and Tottenham Hotspur. On 21 April 2026, it was announced that they would play Juventus as part of the Hong Kong Football Festival 2026. In May, a trip to Malaysia was added with a fixture against Johor Darul Ta'zim. On 21 July, a home friendly against Real Sociedad was announced.

Win Draw Loss Fixtures

28 July 2026 Sydney Super Cup	Western Sydney Wanderers	4–6	Chelsea	Sydney, Australia
19:45 AEST	Pantazopoulos 14'; Hammond 32'; Scicluna 62'; Lual 78'; Abdul-Rahman (yellow card) 90+3'	Report	Satpayev 6'; Essugo 38'; Gittens 66'; João Pedro 80', 85', 89'	Stadium: Accor Stadium; Attendance: 50,000; Referee: Daniel Elder

1 August 2026 Sydney Super Cup	Chelsea	1–2	Tottenham Hotspur	Sydney, Australia
19:45 AEST	Estêvão 21'	Report	Gallagher (yellow card) 11'; Tonali 17'; Danso (red card) 49'; Richarlison 90+2'	Stadium: Accor Stadium; Attendance: 80,363; Referee: Alex King

5 August 2026 Hong Kong Football Festival	Chelsea	0–1	Juventus	Kowloon, Hong Kong
19:30 HKT	Caicedo (yellow card) 62'; Lavia (yellow card) 81'	Report	Douglas Luiz (yellow card) 58'; Zhegrova 68'; Gatti (yellow card) 71'; Bremer (yellow card) 81'	Stadium: Kai Tak Stadium; Attendance: 43,575; Referee: Ho Wai Sing

8 August 2026 Indonesia Super Cup	Chelsea	3–0	Milan	Jakarta, Indonesia
19:00 WIB	João Pedro 45+2', 46'; Caicedo 50'	Report	Pavlović (yellow card) 45'	Stadium: Gelora Bung Karno Stadium; Attendance: 40,856; Referee: Yudai Yamamoto

9 August 2026 Friendly	Johor Darul Ta'zim	3–3	Chelsea	Johor, Malaysia
20:00 MYT	Aiman 14'; Israfilov (yellow card) 44'; Silva (yellow card) 52'; Arribas 65'; Glauder (yellow card) 68'; Bérgson 86'	Report	Delap 42' (pen.), 62' (pen.), (yellow card) 45'; Estêvão (yellow card) 54'; Jackson (yellow card) 66'; Quenda (yellow card) 75'; Glauder 89' (o.g.); Watson (yellow card) 90+2'	Stadium: Sultan Ibrahim Stadium; Attendance: 28,741; Referee: Tuan Mohd Yasin

15 August 2026 Friendly	Chelsea	3–1	Real Sociedad	Fulham
14:00 BST	Rogers 11'; João Pedro 47', 77'	Report	Aramburu 45'	Stadium: Stamford Bridge; Attendance: 34,715; Referee: Andy Madley

== Competitions ==
=== Overall record ===
Competition	First match	Last match	Starting round	Final position	Record							
Competition	First match	Last match	Starting round	Final position	Pld	W	D	L	GF	GA	GD	Win %
Premier League	24 August 2026	30 May 2027	Matchday 1	TBD	11	5	1	5	20	20	+0	45.45
FA Cup	8–11 January 2027	TBD	Third round	TBD	0	0	0	0	0	0	+0	—
EFL Cup	27 August 2026	28 October 2026	Second round	Fourth round	3	2	1	0	9	4	+5	66.67
Total					14	7	2	5	29	24	+5	50.00

Last updated: 21 November 2026
Source: Soccerway

=== Premier League ===
==== League table ====
Pos	Team	Pld	W	D	L	GF	GA	GD	Pts
6	Leeds United	11	4	5	2	14	9	+5	17
7	Everton	10	4	4	2	12	10	+2	16
8	Chelsea	11	5	1	5	20	20	0	16
9	Tottenham Hotspur	11	4	3	4	12	11	+1	15
10	Brentford	10	3	5	2	16	11	+5	14

Updated to match(es) played on 21 November 2026. Source: Premier League
Rules for classification: 1) Points; 2) Goal difference; 3) Goals scored; 4) If the champions, relegated teams or qualified teams for UEFA competitions cannot be determined by rules 1 to 3 following the completion of the competition, rules 4.1 to 4.3 are applied between such teams – 4.1) Head-to-head points; 4.2) Head-to-head away goals; 4.3) Play-off at a neutral site.

==== Results summary ====
Overall								Home						Away					
Pld	W	D	L	GF	GA	GD	Pts	W	D	L	GF	GA	GD	W	D	L	GF	GA	GD
11	5	1	5	20	20	0	16	3	1	2	14	12	+2	2	0	3	6	8	−2

Last updated: 21 November 2026.
Source: Soccerway

==== Results by round ====
Round	1	2	3	4	5	6	7	8	9	10	11	12	13	14	15	16	17	18	19	20	21	22	23	24	25	26	27	28	29	30	31	32	33	34	35	36	37	38
Ground	A	H	A	H	A	H	A	H	H	A	H	A	H	H	A	H	A	A	H	A	H	A	H	A	A	H	A	H	H	A	H	A	H	A	A	H	A	H
Result	W	W	L	D	L	W	W	L	W	L	L																											
Position	6	4	4	6	10	6	4	5	4	5																												
Points	3	6	6	7	7	10	13	13	16	16	16																											

Updated to match(es) played on 21 November 2026. Source: Soccerway
A = Away; H = Home; W = Win; D = Draw; L = Loss; P = Postponed

==== Score overview ====
Win Draw Loss

Opposition	Home score	Away score	Aggregate score	Double
Arsenal		1–2		No
Aston Villa				
Bournemouth	5–1			
Brentford		0–3		No
Brighton & Hove Albion	4–3			
Coventry City				
Crystal Palace				
Everton		2–0		
Fulham		3–2		
Hull City	2–2			No
Ipswich Town				
Leeds United	1–4			No
Liverpool				
Manchester City				
Manchester United	2–0			
Newcastle United				
Nottingham Forest				
Sunderland		0–1		No
Tottenham Hotspur	0–2			No

==== Matches ====
The league fixtures were announced on 19 June 2026.

Win Draw Loss Fixtures

24 August 2026 1	Fulham	2–3	Chelsea	Fulham
20:00 BST	King 23'; García 54'; Bassey (yellow card) 76'; Castagne (yellow card) 88'	Report	João Pedro 1'; Colwill (yellow card) 5'; Lavia (yellow card) 12'; Rogers 41'; Palmer 49'; James (yellow card) 75'	Stadium: Craven Cottage; Attendance: 27,461; Referee: John Brooks

30 August 2026 2	Chelsea	4–3	Brighton & Hove Albion	Fulham
14:00 BST	Lavia 4'; Neto 14'; João Pedro 32'; Fofana (yellow card) 55'; Palmer 74'	Report	Yalcouyé 35'; João Pedro 63' (o.g.); Dunk (yellow card) 70'; Boscagli (yellow card) 89'; Costinha (yellow card) 90+1'; Groß 90+6'	Stadium: Stamford Bridge; Attendance: 39,494; Referee: Michael Oliver
Note: Fixture was originally scheduled for 29 August, but was moved for live Sky Sports broadcasting.

6 September 2026 3	Arsenal	2–1	Chelsea	Holloway
16:30 BST	Havertz 25'; Ødegaard 50'; Tzolis (yellow card) 58'; Merino (yellow card) 90+5'	Report	Rogers 2', (yellow card) 83'; João Pedro (yellow card) 14'; Palmer (yellow card) 45'; Lacroix (yellow card) 58'	Stadium: Emirates Stadium; Attendance: 60,240; Referee: Chris Kavanagh
Note: Fixture was originally scheduled for 5 September, but was moved for live Sky Sports broadcasting.

12 September 2026 4	Chelsea	2–2	Hull City	Fulham
15:00 BST	Rogers 7'; João Pedro 66'; Barco (yellow card) 80'	Report	McBurnie (yellow card) 17'; Belloumi 28', 34'; Egan (yellow card) 50'; Crooks (yellow card) 52'; Iroegbunam (yellow card) 88'; Norton-Cuffy (yellow card) 90+6'	Stadium: Stamford Bridge; Attendance: 39,352; Referee: Farai Hallam

18 September 2026 5	Brentford	3–0	Chelsea	Brentford
20:00 BST	Anthony 61'; Thiago 83', (yellow card) 84'; Sangaré (yellow card) 85'; Carvalho 90+4'	Report		Stadium: Gtech Community Stadium; Attendance: 17,193; Referee: Andy Madley
Note: Fixture was originally scheduled for 19 September, but was moved for live Sky Sports broadcasting.

10 October 2026 6	Chelsea	5–1	Bournemouth	Fulham
15:00 BST	Henderson 2', 70'; Rogers 3'; João Pedro 46', 67'	Report	Tavernier (yellow card) 10'; Truffert (yellow card) 42'; Evanilson 51'; Adams (yellow card) 62'; Christie (yellow card) 69'	Stadium: Stamford Bridge; Attendance: 39,767; Referee: Sam Barrott

17 October 2026 7	Everton	0–2	Chelsea	Liverpool
12:30 BST	Armstrong (yellow card) 23'; Tarkowski (yellow card) 34'; Nørgaard (yellow card) 89'	Report	Neto (yellow card) 27', (goal) 46', 90'; Acheampong (yellow card) 32'; Rogers (yellow card) 34'; Palmer (yellow card) 65'	Stadium: Hill Dickinson Stadium; Attendance: 52,271; Referee: Paul Tierney
Note: Fixture was originally scheduled for 15:00, but was moved for live TNT Sports broadcasting.

24 October 2026 8	Chelsea	0–2	Tottenham Hotspur	Fulham
17:30 BST	Palmer (yellow card) 71' (yellow-red card) 80'; Neto (yellow card) 79'; Rogers (yellow card) 90+1'	Report	Gallagher (yellow card) 67'; Van de Ven (yellow card) 71'; Fernandes (yellow card) 72'; Penders 77' (o.g.); Tel 87'	Stadium: Stamford Bridge; Attendance: 39,402; Referee: Chris Kavanagh
Note: Fixture was originally scheduled for 15:00, but was moved for live Sky Sports broadcasting.

31 October 2026 9	Chelsea	2–0	Manchester United	Fulham
12:30 GMT	Rogers 50'; Palmer 64' (pen.); Penders (yellow card) 90+3'	Report	Martínez (yellow card) 59' (yellow-red card) 63'; Maguire (yellow card) 65'; Mainoo (yellow card) 70'; Mbeumo (yellow card) 81'; Zirkzee (yellow card) 86'	Stadium: Stamford Bridge; Attendance: 39,503; Referee: Peter Bankes
Note: Fixture was originally scheduled for 15:00, but was moved for live TNT Sports broadcasting.

8 November 2026 10	Sunderland	1–0	Chelsea	Sunderland
14:00 GMT	Ahoka (yellow card) 21'; Le Fée 36' (pen.); Meunier (yellow card) 50'; Brobbey (yellow card) 53'; O'Nien (yellow card) 90'; Angulo (yellow card) 90+4'	Report	Colwill (yellow card) 35'; Neto (yellow card) 55'; Caicedo (yellow card) 76'; Fofana (yellow card) 90'	Stadium: Stadium of Light; Attendance: 46,388; Referee: Jarred Gillett
Note: Fixture was originally scheduled for 7 November, but was moved for live Sky Sports broadcasting.

21 November 2026 11	Chelsea	1–4	Leeds United	Fulham
15:00 GMT	Emegha 25'; Lavia (yellow card) 47'	Report	Okafor 28', 58'; Gudmundsson (yellow card) 38'; Calvert-Lewin 53' (pen.); Bogle (yellow card) 68'; Longstaff (yellow card) 83'; Aaronson 90+1'	Stadium: Stamford Bridge; Attendance: 39,573; Referee: Michael Oliver

27 November 2026 12	Nottingham Forest	v	Chelsea	Nottingham
20:00 GMT		Report		Stadium: City Ground
Note: Fixture was originally scheduled for 28 November, but was moved for live Sky Sports broadcasting.

2 December 2026 13	Chelsea	v	Crystal Palace	Fulham
19:30 GMT		Report		Stadium: Stamford Bridge
Note: Fixture was originally scheduled for a 20:00 kick-off, but was pushed back fifteen minutes for live Sky Sports broadcasting.

5 December 2026 14	Chelsea	v	Liverpool	Fulham
12:30 GMT		Report		Stadium: Stamford Bridge
Note: Fixture was originally scheduled for a 15:00 kick-off, but was brought forward for live TNT Sports broadcasting.

12 December 2026 15	Manchester City	v	Chelsea	Manchester
17:30 GMT		Report		Stadium: Etihad Stadium
Note: Fixture was originally scheduled for a 15:00 kick-off, but was pushed back for live Sky Sports broadcasting.

21 December 2026 16	Chelsea	v	Aston Villa	Fulham
20:00 GMT		Report		Stadium: Stamford Bridge
Note: Fixture was originally scheduled for 19 December, but was pushed back two days for live Sky Sports broadcasting.

27 December 2026 17	Coventry City	v	Chelsea	Coventry
14:00 GMT		Report		Stadium: Coventry Building Society Arena
Note: Fixture was originally scheduled for 26 December, but was moved for live Sky Sports broadcasting.

30 December 2026 18	Ipswich Town	v	Chelsea	Ipswich
20:15 GMT		Report		Stadium: Portman Road
Note: Fixture was originally scheduled for 20:00, but was moved for live Sky Sports broadcasting.

3 January 2027 19	Chelsea	v	Newcastle United	Fulham
14:00 GMT		Report		Stadium: Stamford Bridge
Note: Fixture was originally scheduled for 2 January, but was moved for live Sky Sports broadcasting.

6 January 2027 20	Crystal Palace	v	Chelsea	Selhurst
19:30 GMT		Report		Stadium: Selhurst Park
Note: Fixture was originally scheduled for 20:00, but was moved for live Sky Sports broadcasting.

16 January 2027 21	Chelsea	v	Sunderland	Fulham
15:00 GMT		Report		Stadium: Stamford Bridge

25 January 2027 22	Leeds United	v	Chelsea	Leeds
15:00 GMT		Report		Stadium: Elland Road
Note: Fixture was initially scheduled for 23 January, but was pushed back two-days for live Sky Sports broadcasting.

30 January 2027 23	Chelsea	v	Nottingham Forest	Fulham
17:30 GMT		Report		Stadium: Stamford Bridge
Note: Fixture was initially scheduled for a 15:00 kick-off, but was pushed back for live Sky Sports broadcasting.

6 February 2027 24	Manchester United	v	Chelsea	Trafford
15:00 GMT		Report		Stadium: Old Trafford

10 February 2027 25	Newcastle United	v	Chelsea	Newcastle upon Tyne
20:00 GMT		Report		Stadium: St James' Park

20 February 2027 26	Chelsea	v	Ipswich Town	Fulham
15:00 GMT		Report		Stadium: Stamford Bridge

27 February 2027 27	Aston Villa	v	Chelsea	Birmingham
15:00 GMT		Report		Stadium: Villa Park

3 March 2027 28	Chelsea	v	Coventry City	Fulham
20:00 GMT		Report		Stadium: Stamford Bridge

13 March 2027 29	Chelsea	v	Arsenal	Fulham
15:00 GMT		Report		Stadium: Stamford Bridge

20 March 2027 30	Hull City	v	Chelsea	Kingston upon Hull
15:00 GMT		Report		Stadium: MKM Stadium

10 April 2027 31	Chelsea	v	Fulham	Fulham
15:00 BST		Report		Stadium: Stamford Bridge

17 April 2027 32	Brighton & Hove Albion	v	Chelsea	Brighton and Hove
15:00 BST		Report		Stadium: American Express Stadium

24 April 2027 33	Chelsea	v	Manchester City	Fulham
15:00 BST		Report		Stadium: Stamford Bridge

1 May 2027 34	Liverpool	v	Chelsea	Liverpool
15:00 BST		Report		Stadium: Anfield

8 May 2027 35	Tottenham Hotspur	v	Chelsea	Tottenham
15:00 BST		Report		Stadium: Tottenham Hotspur Stadium

15 May 2027 36	Chelsea	v	Everton	Fulham
15:00 BST		Report		Stadium: Stamford Bridge

23 May 2027 37	Bournemouth	v	Chelsea	Bournemouth
15:00 BST		Report		Stadium: Dean Court

30 May 2027 38	Chelsea	v	Brentford	Fulham
16:00 BST		Report		Stadium: Stamford Bridge

=== FA Cup ===
Win Draw Loss Fixtures

=== EFL Cup ===
Win Draw Loss Fixtures

In the second round of the League Cup, Chelsea faced League One club Luton Town at home. In the third round, Chelsea hosted fellow Premier League club Leeds United. In the fourth round, they played Liverpool away.

27 August 2026 Second round	Chelsea	2–0	Luton Town	Fulham
19:30 BST	Welbeck 50'; Odoffin 79' (o.g.)	Report	Johnson (yellow card) 56'	Stadium: Stamford Bridge; Attendance: 32,210; Referee: Elliot Bell

9 September 2026 Third round	Chelsea	6–3	Leeds United	Fulham
20:15 BST	Watson (yellow card) 45+1'; Palmer 53' (pen.), 55'; Neto 60'; Welbeck 65', 90+4'; Barco 80'	Report	Muharemović 23'; Aaronson 48'; Calvert-Lewin 75'	Stadium: Stamford Bridge; Attendance: 35,696; Referee: Jarred Gillett
Note: Kick-off was delayed by fifteen minutes due to disruption on the London Underground.

28 October 2026 Fourth round	Liverpool	1–1 (6–5 p)	Chelsea	Liverpool
20:00 GMT	Koumas (yellow card) 11'; McConnell (yellow card) 21'; Gakpo 43' (pen.)	Report	Rogers 40' (pen.); Acheampong (yellow card) 50'; Lavia (yellow card) 73'	Stadium: Anfield; Attendance: 60,214; Referee: Darren England
	Penalties
	Mac Allister (penalty scored); Isak (penalty scored); Gakpo (penalty scored); Wirtz (penalty scored); Tsimikas (penalty missed); Barcola (penalty scored); Gravenberch (penalty missed); Gomez (penalty scored)		(penalty scored) Neto; (penalty scored) Rogers; (penalty scored) Lavia; (penalty missed) Barco; (penalty scored) Henderson; (penalty scored) Colwill; (penalty missed) Emegha; (penalty missed) Fofana

== Statistics ==
=== Appearances ===
No.	Pos.	Player	Premier League	FA Cup	EFL Cup	Total
1	GK	(Argentina) Emiliano Martínez	7+0	0+0	0+0	7+0
2	DF	(Italy) Marco Palestra	2+3	0+0	0+1	2+4
3	DF	(France) Wesley Fofana	7+0	0+0	1+1	8+1
4	MF	(Argentina) Valentín Barco	1+3	0+0	2+1	3+4
5	DF	(France) Maxence Lacroix	7+1	0+0	3+0	10+1
6	DF	(England) Levi Colwill	10+0	0+0	1+1	11+1
7	FW	(Portugal) Pedro Neto	9+2	0+0	1+2	10+4
9	FW	(Brazil) João Pedro	6+0	0+0	0+1	6+1
10	MF	(England) Cole Palmer	11+0	0+0	1+1	12+1
11	FW	(England) Jamie Gittens	0+0	0+0	1+1	1+1
14	MF	(England) Jordan Henderson	5+1	0+0	1+0	6+1
17	MF	(England) Morgan Rogers	11+0	0+0	2+1	13+1
18	FW	(England) Danny Welbeck	1+8	0+0	3+0	4+8
21	DF	(Netherlands) Jorrel Hato	6+0	0+0	0+1	6+1
22	FW	(Netherlands) Emmanuel Emegha	1+1	0+0	0+1	1+2
23	FW	(Portugal) Geovany Quenda	1+6	0+0	0+0	1+6
24	DF	(England) Reece James	3+1	0+0	1+1	4+2
25	MF	(Ecuador) Moisés Caicedo	6+1	0+0	1+0	7+1
27	DF	(France) Malo Gusto	3+5	0+0	3+0	6+5
28	GK	(England) Teddy Sharman-Lowe	0+0	0+0	0+0	0+0
29	DF	(Spain) Pep Chavarría	4+5	0+0	2+0	6+5
30	DF	(Argentina) Aarón Anselmino	0+0	0+0	0+0	0+0
31	MF	(England) Reggie Watson	0+0	0+0	1+0	1+0
32	MF	(England) Mahdi Nicoll-Jazuli	0+1	0+0	0+0	0+1
34	DF	(England) Josh Acheampong	7+2	0+0	3+0	10+2
37	DF	(England) Olutayo Subuloye	0+0	0+0	0+0	0+0
39	GK	(Belgium) Mike Penders	3+1	0+0	3+0	6+1
41	FW	(Brazil) Estêvão	2+7	0+0	2+0	4+7
44	GK	(United States) Gabriel Slonina	0+0	0+0	0+0	0+0
45	MF	(Belgium) Roméo Lavia	7+2	0+0	1+1	8+3
Players who have left the club
	GK	(Spain) Robert Sánchez	1+0	0+0	0+0	1+0
	MF	(Argentina) Enzo Fernández	0+1	0+0	0+0	0+1

Last updated: 21 November 2026.
Source: FBref.com

=== Goalscorers ===
Rank	No.	Pos.	Player	Premier League	FA Cup	EFL Cup	Total
1	17	MF	(England) Morgan Rogers	5	0	1	6
2	9	FW	(Brazil) João Pedro	5	0	0	5
2	10	MF	(England) Cole Palmer	3	0	2	5
4	7	FW	(Portugal) Pedro Neto	3	0	1	4
5	18	FW	(England) Danny Welbeck	0	0	3	3
6	14	MF	(England) Jordan Henderson	2	0	0	2
7	4	MF	(Argentina) Valentín Barco	0	0	1	1
7	22	FW	(Netherlands) Emmanuel Emegha	1	0	0	1
7	45	MF	(Belgium) Roméo Lavia	1	0	0	1
Own goals				0	0	1	1
Totals				20	0	9	29

Last updated: 21 November 2026.
Source: FBref.com

=== Top assists ===
Rank	No.	Pos.	Player	Premier League	FA Cup	EFL Cup	Total
1	17	MF	(England) Morgan Rogers	2	0	3	5
2	9	FW	(Brazil) João Pedro	3	0	0	3
2	10	MF	(England) Cole Palmer	3	0	0	3
4	21	DF	(Netherlands) Jorrel Hato	2	0	0	2
5	4	MF	(Argentina) Valentín Barco	0	0	1	1
5	5	DF	(France) Maxence Lacroix	1	0	0	1
5	7	FW	(Portugal) Pedro Neto	1	0	0	1
5	14	MF	(England) Jordan Henderson	1	0	0	1
5	27	DF	(France) Malo Gusto	0	0	1	1
5	29	DF	(Spain) Pep Chavarría	1	0	0	1
5	45	MF	(Belgium) Roméo Lavia	1	0	0	1
Totals				16	0	5	21

Last updated: 21 November 2026.
Source: FBref.com

=== Clean sheets ===
Rank	No.	Pos.	Player	Premier League	FA Cup	EFL Cup	Total
1	39	GK	(Belgium) Mike Penders	1	0	1	2
Shared				1 (Note: Shared between Emiliano Martínez and Mike Penders against Everton.)	0	0	1
Totals				2	0	1	3

Last updated: 21 November 2026.
Source: FBref.com

=== Discipline ===
No.	Pos.	Player	Premier League			FA Cup			EFL Cup			Total		
No.	Pos.	Player	Yellow card	(yellow card) (yellow-red card)	Red card	Yellow card	(yellow card) (yellow-red card)	Red card	Yellow card	(yellow card) (yellow-red card)	Red card	Yellow card	(yellow card) (yellow-red card)	Red card
1	GK	(Argentina) Emiliano Martínez	0	0	0	0	0	0	0	0	0	0	0	0
2	DF	(Italy) Marco Palestra	0	0	0	0	0	0	0	0	0	0	0	0
3	DF	(France) Wesley Fofana	2	0	0	0	0	0	0	0	0	2	0	0
4	MF	(Argentina) Valentín Barco	1	0	0	0	0	0	0	0	0	1	0	0
5	DF	(France) Maxence Lacroix	1	0	0	0	0	0	0	0	0	1	0	0
6	DF	(England) Levi Colwill	2	0	0	0	0	0	1	0	0	3	0	0
7	FW	(Portugal) Pedro Neto	3	0	0	0	0	0	0	0	0	3	0	0
9	FW	(Brazil) João Pedro	1	0	0	0	0	0	0	0	0	1	0	0
10	MF	(England) Cole Palmer	2	1	0	0	0	0	0	0	0	2	1	0
11	FW	(England) Jamie Gittens	0	0	0	0	0	0	0	0	0	0	0	0
14	MF	(England) Jordan Henderson	0	0	0	0	0	0	0	0	0	0	0	0
17	MF	(England) Morgan Rogers	3	0	0	0	0	0	0	0	0	3	0	0
18	FW	(England) Danny Welbeck	0	0	0	0	0	0	0	0	0	0	0	0
21	DF	(Netherlands) Jorrel Hato	0	0	0	0	0	0	0	0	0	0	0	0
22	FW	(Netherlands) Emmanuel Emegha	0	0	0	0	0	0	0	0	0	0	0	0
23	FW	(Portugal) Geovany Quenda	0	0	0	0	0	0	0	0	0	0	0	0
24	DF	(England) Reece James	1	0	0	0	0	0	0	0	0	1	0	0
25	MF	(Ecuador) Moisés Caicedo	1	0	0	0	0	0	0	0	0	1	0	0
27	DF	(France) Malo Gusto	0	0	0	0	0	0	0	0	0	0	0	0
28	GK	(England) Teddy Sharman-Lowe	0	0	0	0	0	0	0	0	0	0	0	0
29	DF	(Spain) Pep Chavarría	0	0	0	0	0	0	0	0	0	0	0	0
30	DF	(Argentina) Aarón Anselmino	0	0	0	0	0	0	0	0	0	0	0	0
31	MF	(England) Reggie Watson	0	0	0	0	0	0	1	0	0	1	0	0
32	MF	(England) Mahdi Nicoll-Jazuli	0	0	0	0	0	0	0	0	0	0	0	0
34	DF	(England) Josh Acheampong	1	0	0	0	0	0	1	0	0	2	0	0
37	DF	(England) Olutayo Subuloye	0	0	0	0	0	0	0	0	0	0	0	0
39	GK	(Belgium) Mike Penders	1	0	0	0	0	0	0	0	0	1	0	0
41	FW	(Brazil) Estêvão	0	0	0	0	0	0	0	0	0	0	0	0
44	GK	(United States) Gabriel Slonina	0	0	0	0	0	0	0	0	0	0	0	0
45	MF	(Belgium) Roméo Lavia	2	0	0	0	0	0	0	0	0	2	0	0
Players who have left the club
	GK	(Spain) Robert Sánchez	0	0	0	0	0	0	0	0	0	0	0	0
	MF	(Argentina) Enzo Fernández	0	0	0	0	0	0	0	0	0	0	0	0
Totals			21	1	0	0	0	0	3	0	0	24	1	0

Last updated: 21 November 2026.
Source: FBref.com

== Awards ==
=== Player awards ===
==== Golden Boy ====
Pos.	Player	Result	Ref.
FW	(Brazil) Estêvão	Nominated	
DF	(Netherlands) Jorrel Hato	Nominated	

==== Premier League Player of the Month ====
Month	Pos.	Player	Pld	G	A	CS	S	Result	Ref.
August	FW	(Brazil) João Pedro	2	2	2	–	–	Won	
August	MF	(England) Cole Palmer	2	2	1	–	–	Nominated	

==== Premier League Goal of the Month ====
Month	Pos.	Player	Opposition	Result	Ref.
August	MF	(England) Cole Palmer	Brighton & Hove Albion	Nominated	

==== Premier League Save of the Month ====
Month	Player	Opposition	Result	Ref.
October	(Belgium) Mike Penders	Manchester United	Won	

=== Manager awards ===
==== Premier League Manager of the Month ====
Month	Manager	M	W	D	L	GF	GA	GD	Pts	Result	Ref.
August	(Spain) Xabi Alonso	2	2	0	0	7	5	+2	6	Nominated	
October	(Spain) Xabi Alonso	2	3	0	1	9	3	+6	9	Nominated	
