= Chicão =

Chicão may refer to:

== People ==
=== Football ===
- Chicão (footballer, born 1940) (1940–1968), born Francisco Amancio dos Santos, Brazilian defender
- Chicão (footballer, born 1949) (1949–2008), born Francisco Jezuíno Avanzi, Brazilian defensive midfielder
- Chicão (footballer, born 1962), born Francisco Carlos Martins Vidal, Brazilian football forward
- Chicão (footballer, born February 1979), born Francisco Alves dos Santos, Brazilian defensive midfielder
- Chicão (footballer, born December 1979), born José João de Jesus, Brazilian defensive midfielder
- Chicão (footballer, born 1981), born Anderson Sebastião Cardoso, Brazilian defender

== Other ==
- Chicão language, alternative name to Ikpeng language, indigenous language in Brazil

== See also ==
- Chico (disambiguation)
