= Chico's =

Chico's may refer to:

- Chico's Bail Bonds, fictional company in the film The Bad News Bears
- Chico's Tacos, restaurant chain in El Paso, Texas
- Chico's FAS, women's apparel retailer

== See also ==
- Chico (disambiguation)
