= Ch'iqlla =

Mountain in Bolivia

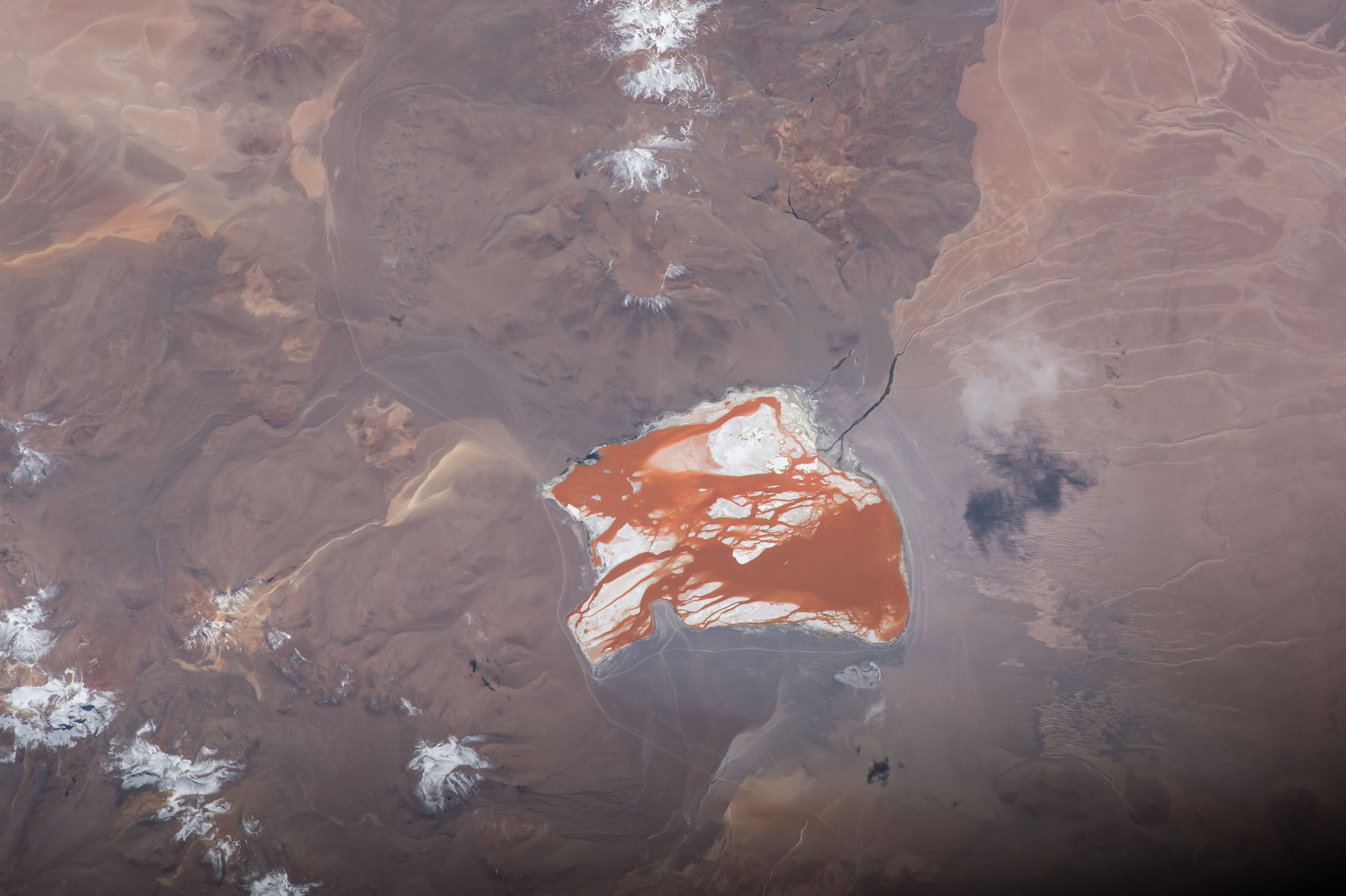
- Laguna Colorada and Ch'iqlla (above it) as seen from the ISS

Highest point
- Elevation: 5,709 m (18,730 ft)
- Coordinates: 22°06′15″S 67°45′35″W

Geography
- Location within Bolivia
- Location: Bolivia; Potosí Department
- Parent range: Andes

Ch'iqlla (Quechua for tadpole, also spelled Chijlla) is a 5,709-metre-high (18,730 ft) mountain in Bolivia. It is located in the Potosí Department, Sud Lípez Province, San Pablo de Lípez Municipality. Ch'iqlla lies between the Ch'iqu volcano in the north and Laguna Colorada in the south.
