= Andrezinho (footballer, born 1979) =

Brazilian footballer (born 1979)

Personal information
- Full name: André Ricardo Barbosa de Aguiar Ferreira
- Date of birth: 27 January 1979 (age 47)
- Place of birth: São Paulo, Brazil
- Height: 1.68 m (5 ft 6 in)
- Position: Attacking midfielder

Youth career
- Corinthians

Senior career*
Years	Team	Apps	(Gls)
1999–2005	Corinthians	18	(0)
2002	→ Americano (loan)	4	(0)
2002	→ Vasco da Gama (loan)	2	(0)
2003	→ Juventus-SP (loan)	4	(0)
2004	→ 15 de Novembro (loan)	9	(0)
2005	→ Noroeste (loan)	5	(0)
2006	Londrina		
2007	XV de Jaú	8	(1)
2007	Nacional-MA		
2007	Nejmeh		
2008	Croatia Sesvete	7	(0)
2008	Paysandu	2	(1)
2008	Rio Branco-AC		
2009	Uberaba	3	(1)
2009	Nacional-MA		
2010	Araguaína		
- * Club domestic league appearances and goals as of 19:27, 7 January 2026 (UTC)

André Ricardo Barbosa de Aguiar Ferreira (born 27 January 1979), commonly known as Andrezinho, is a Brazilian retired footballer who played as an attacking midfielder.

== Career ==
Born in São Paulo, Andrezinho was a Corinthians youth graduate. He made his first team debut on 7 February 1999, in a 3–0 Torneio Rio-São Paulo loss to Flamengo, but never established himself as a regular starter.

Andrezinho's key moment at Timão came in the second leg of the semifinals of the 2001 Campeonato Paulista, when he started the play to Ricardinho's winning goal which qualified the club to the finals. On 26 December of that year, however, he was loaned to Americano for six months.

Andrezinho would not feature for Corinthians in the following seasons, serving loans at Vasco da Gama, Juventus-SP, 15 de Novembro and Noroeste. On 5 January 2006, he joined Londrina.

After beginning the 2007 campaign at XV de Jaú, Andrezinho signed for Nacional-MA in June of that year, before moving abroad to Bahrain with Nejmeh later in that year. In January 2008, he agreed to a deal with Croatia Sesvete, and helped the club to win the Croatian Second Football League.

In August 2008, Andrezinho returned to his home country after signing for Paysandu. He left to Rio Branco-AC after just two matches, and later played for Uberaba, Nacional-MA and Araguaína before retiring in 2010, aged 31.

== Post-playing career ==
After retiring, Andrezinho studied economics, and worked as a finance administrator in Edu Gaspar's company. In November 2021, he joined Santos as a technical scout for the youth setup, and worked in the role for nearly a year.

== Personal life ==
Andrezinho comes from a family of footballers: his grandfather Nena was a defender who played for Internacional and Portuguesa, his older Lucas Yan is also a midfielder, and his younger son Kauan Basile is a forward. Kauan is widely regarded as a promising prospect of Santos' youth sides.

== Honours ==
Corinthians

- Campeonato Brasileiro Série A: 1999
- Campeonato Paulista: 2001
