= Jeanne Perego =

Italian writer and journalist

Jeanne Perego (born 1958) is an Italian writer and journalist. She writes books for kids and teenagers, art, green and cultural tourism. She has worked for many Italian newspapers and magazines, like Il Tirreno, L'Eco di Bergamo, La Provincia di Como, Topolino, Madre, Carnet, Dove, and Giardinaggio. She lives in Tuscany half of the year, and the other half in Bavaria.

She is known internationally as the author of Joseph and Chico, an original biography of Pope Benedict XVI. Translated into 13 languages, it is a collection of stories about the life of Joseph Ratzinger, his origins, and his commitment to study and work. It is an original biography because the narrator is Chico, the cat owned by Joseph Ratzinger's neighbours in Pentling, Bavaria. The introduction was written by Georg Ganswein, private secretary of Benedict XVI. The book was translated into 13 languages, from English to Polish, including Monegasque.

In a second book, Max & Benedict, it is a lonely sparrow that lives on the Vatican walls that narrates the everyday life of the successor of Saint Peter. This book was also translated into other languages, like English and Norwegian.
