= João Pedro (footballer, born 2001) =

Brazilian footballer (born 2001)

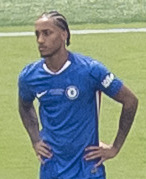
- João Pedro, 2025

Personal information
- Full name: João Pedro Junqueira de Jesus
- Date of birth: 26 September 2001 (age 25)
- Place of birth: Ribeirão Preto, São Paulo, Brazil
- Height: 1.86 m (6 ft 1 in)
- Position: Striker

Team information
- Current team: Chelsea
- Number: 9

Youth career
- 2011–2019: Fluminense

Senior career*
Years	Team	Apps	(Gls)
2019–2020	Fluminense	29	(5)
2020–2023	Watford	104	(23)
2023–2025	Brighton & Hove Albion	58	(19)
2025–	Chelsea	41	(20)

International career^{‡}
2023	Brazil U23	1	(0)
2023–	Brazil	8	(0)
- * Club domestic league appearances and goals as of 16:09, 17 October 2026 (UTC) ‡ National team caps and goals as of 22:00, 31 March 2026 (UTC)

João Pedro Junqueira de Jesus (Portuguese: [ʒuˈɐ̃w̃ ˈpedɾu], born 26 September 2001) is a Brazilian professional footballer who plays as a striker for Premier League club Chelsea and the Brazil national team.

== Early and personal life ==
João Pedro was born in Ribeirão Preto, São Paulo to parents Flavia Junqueira and José João de Jesus, more commonly known as Chicão, a former professional footballer who most notably played for Botafogo-SP. Chicão was jailed for sixteen years in 2002, serving eight, for being an accessory to murder. By the time of Chicão's imprisonment, he and Junqueira had separated.

== Club career ==
=== Fluminense ===
João Pedro joined the youth system of Fluminense, and his mother moved with him to Rio de Janeiro. As he moved through the club's academy, he switched from being a defensive midfielder to an attacking midfielder, and then a striker. On 19 October 2018, before he had even made his senior debut, EFL Championship club Watford reached an agreement on a deal to sign João Pedro in January 2020 on a five-year contract. On 24 March 2019, João Pedro made his senior professional debut for Fluminense, coming on as a second-half substitute and scoring in the 72nd minute of a 3–2 defeat against rivals Flamengo in the Campeonato Carioca. Three days later, on 27 March, he made another appearance against Flamengo as a stoppage-time substitute in the Taça Rio semi-final (a 2–1 loss). A month later on 29 April, he made his league debut as a late substitute in the 1–0 loss to Goiás. He then proceeded to fire seven goals in his next four games, including a hat trick in a 4–1 Copa Sudamericana victory against Atlético Nacional.

=== Watford ===
On 30 October 2019, it was announced that he had received his UK work permit and would sign for Watford in January 2020. Initially delayed by the world-wide Covid shutdowns, Pedro scored his first goal for Watford in a 1–0 win over Luton Town on 26 September 2020, his 19th birthday. On 16 October 2020, he scored a long-range goal in a win over Derby County.

Pedro scored his first Premier League goal against Manchester United on 20 November 2021. He dedicated the goal to his late stepfather, Carlos Junior. On 15 January 2022, he scored the equaliser against Newcastle United in the 88th minute. The match ended in a 1–1 draw.

=== Brighton and Hove Albion ===
On 5 May 2023, Premier League side Brighton & Hove Albion confirmed the acquisition of Pedro from Watford, with the transfer fee undisclosed, but reported to be in the region of a club-record £30 million fee. He made his debut in the opening match of the 2023–24 season on 12 August, starting the match and later scoring from the spot in the 4–1 home win over Premier League newcomers Luton Town. Pedro scored Brighton's first ever European goals on 21 September, netting two from the spot in the eventual 3–2 home Europa League loss against Greek champions AEK Athens. Pedro finished the Europa League group stage as the outright top scorer with six goals in six games, including a late winner in the final match, as Brighton topped their group to qualify for the last 16.

On 24 August 2024, Pedro scored his first goal of the 2024–25 season, the winning goal in stoppage time of a 2–1 victory over Manchester United. On 19 April 2025, he was sent off for flicking his hand into Brentford defender Nathan Collins' face during a 4–2 loss and was given a three-game ban for violent conduct. On 23 May 2025, the club announced Pedro had been dropped from the squad for their final match of the season against Tottenham Hotspur and was absent for the previous matches against Wolverhampton Wanderers and Liverpool over a training ground incident.

=== Chelsea ===
João Pedro with Chelsea in 2025

On 2 July 2025, Pedro was signed by fellow Premier League club Chelsea on a deal until 2033 for a reported fee of £55m plus £5m add-ons. He was included in Chelsea's 2025 FIFA Club World Cup squad during the tournament's second registration window on that same day. He made his debut in the quarter-finals two days later, where he came on as a second-half substitute in Chelsea's 2–1 victory against Palmeiras. On 8 July 2025, he scored a brace in the semi-final against his boyhood club Fluminense. In the final, he scored the last goal in a 3–0 victory over Paris Saint-Germain.

On 22 August 2025, Pedro scored his first Premier League goal for Chelsea with a headed finish from a corner in their 5–1 victory over West Ham United at the London Stadium. Later that year, on 9 December, he scored his first UEFA Champions League goal in a 2–1 away defeat against Atalanta. On 28 January 2026, he netted a brace in a 3–2 away victory over Napoli, securing his club's place in the Champions League round of 16. On 4 March, Pedro scored his first hat-trick for Chelsea in a 4–1 win at Aston Villa.

On 24 August 2026, Pedro opened the scoring after just 31 seconds in Chelsea’s 3–2 victory over Fulham, making it the fastest goal in the history of the Premier League's opening round. On 30 August 2026, Pedro scored a goal and an assist against Brighton while scoring an own goal in a 4-3 win.

== International career ==
On 19 August 2023, Pedro was called up for the Brazil Olympic football team. Pedro would make his Brazil debut as an 84th-minute substitute in a 1–0 loss against Morocco.

Three months later on 6 November 2023, Pedro was called up to the Brazil senior team for the first time. On 16 November, Pedro would make his debut for the Seleção after coming on as a substitute for the injured Vinícius Júnior at the 27th-minute mark in a 2–1 loss to Colombia.

== Outside football ==
In June 2026, Pedro was featured in Madonna's promotional short film Confessions II during the "Danceteria" segment.

== Career statistics ==
=== Club ===
As of match played 17 October 2026

Appearances and goals by club, season and competition
Club	Season	League			State league (Note: Includes Campeonato Carioca)		National cup (Note: Includes Copa do Brasil, FA Cup)		League cup (Note: Includes EFL Cup)		Continental		Other		Total	
Club	Season	Division	Apps	Goals	Apps	Goals	Apps	Goals	Apps	Goals	Apps	Goals	Apps	Goals	Apps	Goals
Fluminense	2019	Série A	25	4	4	1	4	2	—		4 (Note: Appearances in Copa Sudamericana)	3	—		37	10
Watford	2019–20	Premier League	3	0	—		2	0	—		—		—		5	0
Watford	2020–21	Championship	38	9	—		1	0	1	0	—		—		40	9
Watford	2021–22	Premier League	28	3	—		1	1	0	0	—		—		29	4
Watford	2022–23	Championship	35	11	—		0	0	0	0	—		—		35	11
Watford	Total		104	23	—		4	1	1	0	—		—		109	24
Brighton & Hove Albion	2023–24	Premier League	31	9	—		2	5	1	0	6 (Note: Appearances in UEFA Europa League)	6	—		40	20
Brighton & Hove Albion	2024–25	Premier League	27	10	—		3	0	0	0	—		—		30	10
Brighton & Hove Albion	Total		58	19	—		5	5	1	0	6	6	—		70	30
Chelsea	2024–25	Premier League	—		—		—		—		—		3 (Note: Appearances in FIFA Club World Cup)	3	3	3
Chelsea	2025–26	Premier League	35	15	—		4	2	3	0	8 (Note: Appearances in UEFA Champions League)	3	—		50	20
Chelsea	2026–27	Premier League	6	5	—		0	0	1	0	—		—		7	5
Chelsea	Total		41	20	—		4	2	4	0	8	3	3	3	60	28
Career total			228	65	5	2	16	9	6	0	18	12	3	3	275	92

=== International ===
As of match played 31 March 2026

Appearances and goals by national team and year
National team	Year	Apps	Goals
Brazil	2023	1	0
Brazil	2024	1	0
Brazil	2025	4	0
Brazil	2026	2	0
Total		8	0

== Honours ==
Chelsea

- FIFA Club World Cup: 2025
- FA Cup runner-up: 2025–26

Individual

- Chelsea Player of the Season: 2025–26
- Premier League Player of the Month: August 2026
