= Chico (cat) =

Cat, narrator of a biography of Pope Benedict XVI

Chico (1995–2012) is a cat who is the narrator of an authorized biography of Pope Benedict XVI.

The illustrated children's book is titled Joseph e Chico: Un gatto racconta la vita di Papa Benedetto XVI. The Italian original has been translated into English as Joseph and Chico: The Life of Pope Benedict XVI as Told By a Cat.

The character of Chico is based on a real cat, a tabby, who lived in the town of Pentling, Germany, where Joseph Ratzinger had lived for 20 years before moving to Rome as a Cardinal.

Chico was born on April 15, 1995.

The book was written by Jeanne Perego and illustrated by Donata Dal Molin Casagrande. It has an introduction by the Rev. Georg Gänswein, the Pope's personal secretary.
