= Mike Penders =

Belgian footballer (born 2005)

- Penders in 2026

Personal information
- Full name: Mike Louis Penders
- Date of birth: 31 July 2005 (age 21)
- Place of birth: Maasmechelen, Belgium
- Height: 2.00 m (6 ft 7 in)
- Position: Goalkeeper

Team information
- Current team: Chelsea
- Number: 39

Youth career
- 2010–2016: Boorsem Sport
- 2016–2018: Bregel Sport
- 2018–2022: Genk

Senior career*
Years	Team	Apps	(Gls)
2022–2024	Jong Genk	39	(0)
2024–2025	Genk	21	(0)
2025–	Chelsea	4	(0)
2025–2026	→ Strasbourg (loan)	33	(0)

International career^{‡}
2021	Belgium U17	2	(0)
2022–2023	Belgium U18	2	(0)
2023–2024	Belgium U19	7	(0)
2025–	Belgium U21	4	(0)
- * Club domestic league appearances and goals as of 17:33, 8 November 2026 (UTC) ‡ National team caps and goals as of 13:24, 30 March 2026 (UTC)

Mike Louis Penders (Dutch pronunciation: [ˈmɑjk ˈpɛndərs]; born 31 July 2005) is a Belgian professional footballer who plays as a goalkeeper for Premier League club Chelsea.

== Club career ==
=== Genk ===
Penders is a youth product of Boorsem Sport and Bregel Sport, before moving to the academy of Genk in 2018.

On 30 April 2021, he signed his first contract with Genk. On 25 May 2022, he extended his contract until 2025.

In the 2022–23 season, he was promoted to their reserve team Jong Genk. He made his debut in a 4–1 victory against Lierse.

On 23 August 2023, he again extended his contract until 2028. He was made captain of Jong Genk in the 2023–24 season

Following the departure of Maarten Vandevoordt and injury to Hendrik Van Crombrugge, Penders made his senior debut with the Genk first team in a 0–0 Belgian Pro League tie with Standard Liège on 28 July 2024. At 18 years and 363 days, he was the third youngest goalkeeper to debut in the history of the league.

In January 2025, Genk coach Thorsten Fink announced that Penders would be the team's starting goalkeeper for the remainder of the 2024–25 season. He ended the season having played 21 league matches, including all ten matches in the Championship play-offs.

=== Chelsea ===
On 27 August 2024, it was announced that Penders would join Premier League club Chelsea in the summer of 2025.

In June 2025, Penders was named in Chelsea's squad for the 2025 FIFA Club World Cup in the United States. He was an unused substitute in the final on 13 July 2025.

==== Loan to Strasbourg ====
On 28 July 2025, Penders joined Ligue 1 club Strasbourg on a season-long loan deal.

He made his debut for Strasbourg in their opening Ligue 1 fixture on 17 August, keeping a clean sheet against Metz. He was ever present in Strasbourg's runs to the semi-finals of both the Coupe de France and UEFA Conference League.

==== Return to Chelsea ====
On 27 August 2026, Penders made his debut for Chelsea in the second round of the EFL Cup, keeping a clean sheet in a 2–0 victory over Luton Town.

On 17 October 2026, Penders made his Premier League debut, coming off the bench in the 75th minute against Everton at Hill Dickinson Stadium, after Emiliano Martínez suffered a head injury following a collision with Everton defender Jarrad Branthwaite. Penders kept a clean sheet in a 2–0 victory.

== International career ==
Penders is a youth international for Belgium, having represented the nation at under-17, under-18, under-19 and under-21 level.

In 2023, he was called up to the Belgium U19s where he acted as captain during the 2024 UEFA European Under-19 Championship qualification campaign.

In 2025, Penders played four matches during qualification for the 2027 UEFA European Under-21 Championship.

In August 2025, he received his first call up to the senior Belgium national football team. On 18 November, he was an unused substitute in a 7–0 win over Liechtenstein in a 2026 FIFA World Cup qualifier.

On 15 May 2026, he was named in Belgium's squad for the 2026 FIFA World Cup.

== Career statistics ==
As of match played 8 November 2026

Appearances and goals by club, season and competition
Club	Season	League			National cup (Note: Includes Belgian Cup, Coupe de France)		League cup (Note: Includes EFL Cup)		Europe		Other		Total	
Club	Season	Division	Apps	Goals	Apps	Goals	Apps	Goals	Apps	Goals	Apps	Goals	Apps	Goals
Jong Genk	2021–22	Challenger Pro League	0	0	—		—		—		—		0	0
Jong Genk	2022–23	Challenger Pro League	9	0	—		—		—		—		9	0
Jong Genk	2023–24	Challenger Pro League	25	0	—		—		—		—		25	0
Jong Genk	2024–25	Challenger Pro League	5	0	—		—		—		—		5	0
Jong Genk	Total		39	0	—		—		—		—		39	0
Genk	2024–25	Belgian Pro League	21	0	4	0	—		—		—		25	0
Chelsea	2024–25	Premier League	—		—		—		—		0	0	0	0
Chelsea	2025–26	Premier League	0	0	0	0	0	0	—		—		0	0
Chelsea	2026–27	Premier League	4	0	0	0	3	0	—		—		7	0
Chelsea	Total		4	0	0	0	3	0	0	0	0	0	7	0
Strasbourg (loan)	2025–26	Ligue 1	33	0	5	0	—		12 (Note: Appearances in UEFA Conference League)	0	—		50	0
Career total			97	0	9	0	3	0	12	0	0	0	121	0

== Honours ==
Chelsea

- FIFA Club World Cup: 2025

=== Individual ===
- Sofascore UEFA Conference League Player of the Season: 2025–26
- Premier League Save of the Month: October 2026
