= Qhawana =

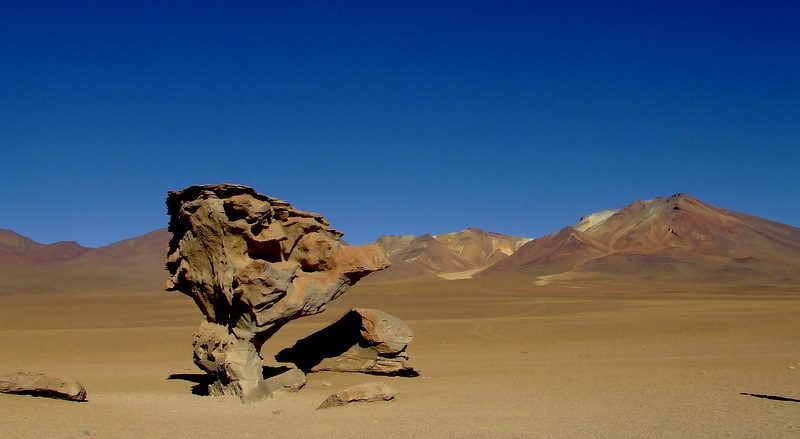
- Árbol de Piedra ("stone tree") with Qhawana in the background

Highest point
- Elevation: 5,300 m (17,400 ft)
- Coordinates: 22°04′26″S 67°57′36″W

Geography
- Location within Bolivia
- Location: Bolivia; Potosí Department
- Parent range: Andes

Qhawana (Quechua for viewpoint, window, Hispanicized spelling Cahuana) is an extinct volcano at the border of Bolivia and Chile which reaches a height of approximately 5,300 m (17,388 ft). It is located in the Potosí Department, Sud Lípez Province, San Pablo de Lípez Municipality. Qhawana lies on the western border of the Eduardo Avaroa Andean Fauna National Reserve, south of Silala.
