= Ch'iqu =

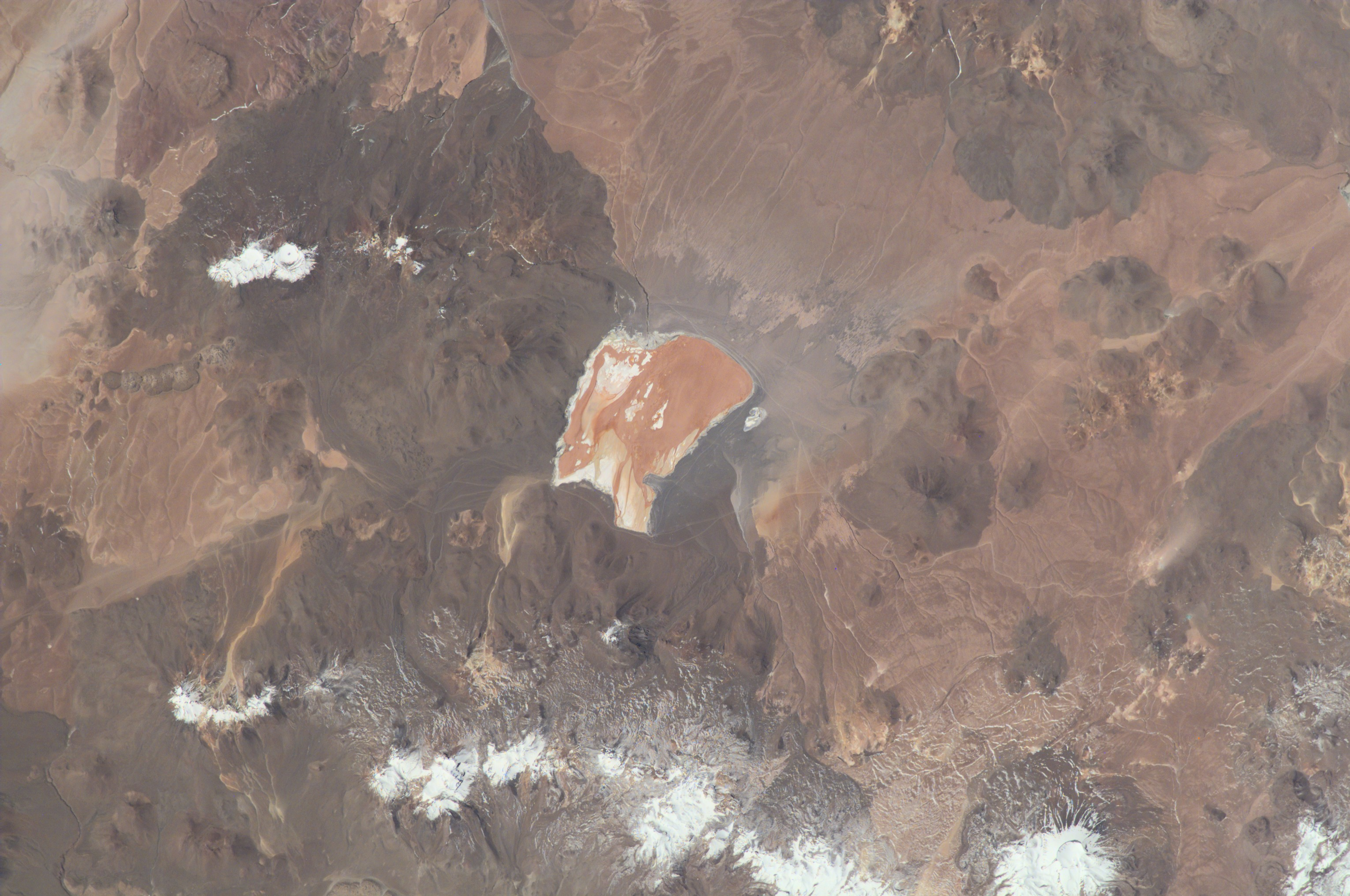
- Laguna Colorada and Ch'iqu (upper left) as seen from the ISS (north is to the upper left part of this image)

Highest point
- Elevation: 5,475 m (17,963 ft)
- Coordinates: 22°01′57″S 67°45′38″W

Geography
- Location within Bolivia
- Location: Bolivia; Potosí Department
- Parent range: Andes

Ch'iqu (Quechua for workable stone, misleadingly also named Volcán Chico (Spanish for "little volcano")) is a 5,475-metre-high (17,963 ft) volcano in Bolivia. It is located in the Potosí Department, Sud Lípez Province, San Pablo de Lípez Municipality. Ch'iqu lies northeast of Qhawana.
