= Reggie Watson =

English footballer (born 2010)

Personal information
- Date of birth: 26 January 2010 (age 16)
- Place of birth: Bromley, England
- Position: Midfielder

Team information
- Current team: Chelsea
- Number: 31

Youth career
- –2025: Crystal Palace
- 2025–2026: Chelsea

Senior career*
Years	Team	Apps	(Gls)
2026–	Chelsea	0	(0)

International career^{‡}
2025	England U15	6	(5)
2025	England U16	9	(3)
2026–	England U17	3	(0)
- * Club domestic league appearances and goals as of 29 July 2026 ‡ National team caps and goals as of 1 October 2026

Reggie Watson (born 26 January 2010) is an English footballer who plays as a midfielder for the youth academy of Premier League club Chelsea. He has represented England at youth international level.

== Early life ==
Watson was born in Bromley, England. He is the son of former Premier League midfielder Ben Watson, who scored the winning goal in the 2013 FA Cup Final for Wigan Athletic.

== Club career ==
Watson began his football development at the youth academy of Crystal Palace before joining the Chelsea Academy during his under-15 season in July 2025.

During the 2025–26 season, Watson established himself in Chelsea's under-18 squad, contributing to titles in both the Southern Division and National finals of the U18 Premier League. He also featured in the FA Youth Cup, scoring against Reading, and played in the knockout stages of the UEFA Youth League against PSV Eindhoven.

In July 2026, at 16 years of age, Watson was included in Chelsea's senior pre-season squad, playing the full 90 minutes in a friendly victory against Western Sydney Wanderers.

On 9 September 2026, Watson made his professional debut as he started for Chelsea in the EFL Cup third round against Leeds United. He was named Premier League 2 Player of the Month in the same month.

== International career ==
Watson has represented England at international youth level, featuring for the England under-16 team during international friendly tournaments in 2025.

On 23 September 2026, Watson made his England U17 debut against Republic of Ireland at St. George's Park.

== Career statistics ==
As of 9 September 2026

Appearances and goals by club, season and competition
Club	Season	League			FA Cup		EFL Cup		Europe		Other		Total	
Club	Season	Division	Apps	Goals	Apps	Goals	Apps	Goals	Apps	Goals	Apps	Goals	Apps	Goals
Chelsea	2026–27	Premier League	0	0	0	0	1	0	—		—		1	0
Career total			0	0	0	0	1	0	0	0	0	0	1	0

== Honours ==
Chelsea U18

- U18 Premier League National Champion: 2025–26
- U18 Premier League Southern Division Champion: 2025–26
