= Kauan Basile =

Brazilian footballer (born 2012)

Personal information
- Full name: Kauan Basile Ferreira
- Date of birth: 21 June 2012 (age 14)
- Place of birth: Brazil
- Positions: Midfielder; forward

Team information
- Current team: Santos

Youth career
- Years: Team
- Santos

Kauan Basile Ferreira (born 21 June 2012) is a Brazilian footballer who plays as a midfielder or forward for Santos.

== Early life ==
Basile was born on 21 June 2012. Born in Brazil, he is of Italian descent through his mother and is the son of Brazilian footballer Andrezinho. Growing up, he played futsal and regarded Venezuela international Yeferson Soteldo and Brazil international Neymar as his football idols.

== Career ==
At the age of eight, Basile signed a sponsorship contract with American sporting apparel brand Nike, becoming the youngest athlete to sign a sponsorship contract with them. As a youth player, he joined the youth academy of Santos.

== Style of play ==
Basile plays as a midfielder. In addition, he can play as a forward and is left-footed.
