= Chico's Tacos =

Restaurant information
- Established: 1950
- Food type: Mexican food
- Location: 4230 Alameda Ave, El Paso, El Paso County, Texas, United States
- Seating capacity: 50
- Other locations: Dyer Street, George Dieter Dr, Montwood Dr

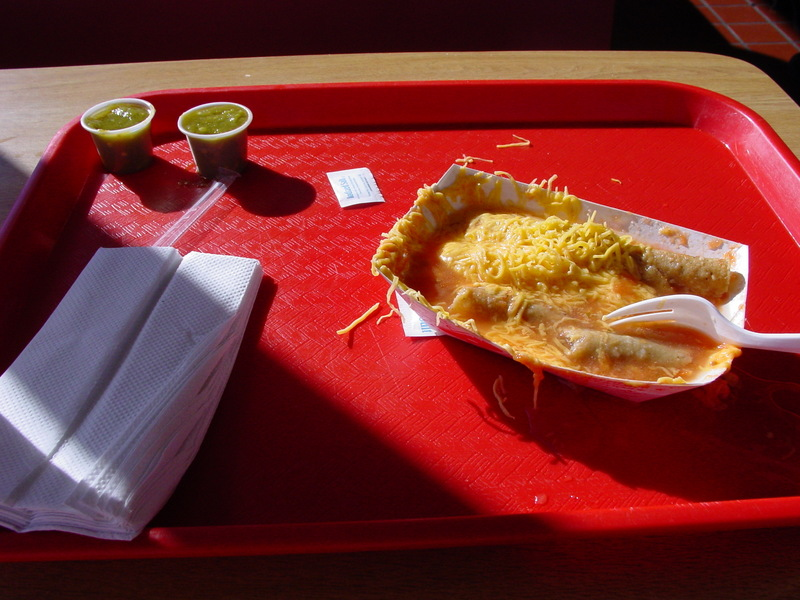
An order of three Chico's Tacos with green chile sauce

Chico's Tacos on Alameda Avenue

Chico's Tacos is a small local restaurant chain based in El Paso, Texas. It was founded on July 4, 1953 by local boxing promoter Joe Mora. Long considered a local institution in El Paso, it is perhaps the city's best-known restaurant, having been featured in the Food Network show The Best Thing I Ever Ate. It was also a topic of the Gabriel Iglesias stand up act I'm not Fat... I'm Fluffy.

Chico's has entered into local legend for its rolled tacos in a special tomato soup-like sauce, as well as its low prices. Other items on the menu include hamburgers, French fries, grilled cheese sandwiches (or as Chicos Tacos employees often refer to them as "grillos"), and special round hot dogs served on hamburger buns. Originally located at 4230 Alameda Avenue on El Paso's south side, Chico's has since expanded to five El Paso locations, primarily on the town's east side. Since Mora's death in 1992, the restaurants have been run by his surviving children.

== Menu specialties ==
Chico's Tacos' specialty dish is a paper tray containing three rolled taquitos, referred to as flautas, submerged in bath of a special tomato soup-like sauce that is topped with shredded Cheese. The custom is to pick up a taco individually from the special tomato sauce, then using a fork, scoop the melted cheese onto the taco before taking a bite. The most commonly ordered items are the single order (three tacos) or double order (six tacos). Often, many devotees will order two single orders instead of one double order, to take advantage of the best in cheese to taco ratios.

In addition to their legendary tacos, Chico's Tacos are also known for their unique hot dogs. Unlike hotdogs commonly served in America, this menu item is served on a hamburger bun with two franks sliced in half lengthwise, topped with their chili, mustard, and pickles. The restaurant also serves crinkle cut fries, which some say taste best with Chico's special tomato sauce and a topping of cheese.

== Recognition ==
In 2003 the 78th Texas House of Representatives adopted a resolution (HR 84), introduced by El Paso representative Norma Chavez, honoring the Mora family and celebrating the restaurant's 50th anniversary.

Standup comedian Gabriel Iglesias mentioned Chico's in his 2009 Comedy Central special I'm Not Fat, I'm Fluffy. During his routine, which was taped in El Paso, Iglesias referenced Chico's as "an El Paso tradition", to the applause of the audience.

== Legal issues ==
In the late 2000s, the owners of Chico's Tacos sued an Austin-based restaurant, Chuco's Tacos, for trademark infringement. In addition to the name, which differed from Chico's by only one letter, Chuco's Tacos also featured a paper tray with rolled tacos in a tomato-based sauce as its main menu item. Chuco's Tacos went out of business on July 18, 2008, before the trial could begin.

== Discrimination controversy ==
On June 29, 2009, Chico's Tacos became the focus of gay-rights protestors when a group of five homosexual men were kicked out of the restaurant after two of them kissed publicly inside the restaurant. When the men did not leave immediately, the graveyard-shift security guard, Marcos Nava, an employee of All American International Security, called 911 in an attempt to have them removed by the El Paso Police Department. "There are two men eating here, and they're kissing," Nava said in Spanish on the 911 recording released by authorities. "They are homosexuals. I approached them and told them that they couldn't be kissing here because there are children here. They were kissing on the lips." The incident received widespread national attention, and the actions of the security guards and El Paso Police were widely condemned, including by the El Paso City Council. In light of this criticism, the restaurant's owners insisted that they have a policy of nondiscrimination, and that the men were ejected because they were unruly, not because they were homosexual. However, the two police officers responding to the 911 call allegedly threatened to have the men arrested for "homosexual conduct," despite there being no such law on the books. As a result of the incident, police chief Greg Allen announced that all officers department-wide would undergo more extensive sensitivity and anti-discrimination training.
