= Mahdi Nicoll-Jazuli =

English footballer (born 2010)

Personal information
- Date of birth: 6 January 2010 (age 16)
- Place of birth: Sydney, Australia
- Position: Central midfielder

Team information
- Current team: Chelsea
- Number: 32

Youth career
- 2016–2026: Chelsea

Senior career*
Years	Team	Apps	(Gls)
2026–	Chelsea	1	(0)

International career^{‡}
2024–	England U16	8	(2)
2025–	England U17	6	(2)
- * Club domestic league appearances and goals as of 22:47, 18 September 2026 (UTC) ‡ National team caps and goals as of 10:47, 26 March 2026 (UTC)

Mahdi Nicoll-Jazuli (born 6 January 2010) is a professional footballer who plays as a central midfielder for Premier League club Chelsea. Born in Australia, he plays for the England under-17 national team.

== Early life ==
Nicoll-Jazuli was born on 6 January 2010. Born in Sydney, Australia, he was born to a Sudanese-Australian mother and an English father. Nicoll-Jazuli also holds French citizenship. He began playing football at the Afewee Training Centre in South London where he was scouted by Chelsea.

== Club career ==
As a youth player, Nicoll-Jazuli joined the youth academy of Premier League side Chelsea at the age of six. Ahead of the 2025–26 season, he was promoted to the club's under-18 team, where he played in the UEFA Youth League. At 15 years old, he became the club's youngest-ever starter in the UEFA Youth League, featuring against Benfica during the group stage, before becoming Chelsea's youngest goal-scorer in the competition with his strike against Ajax.

On 18 September 2026, Nicoll-Jazuli made his professional debut as a late substitute in a Premier League match against Brentford. He became the first player born in 2010 to play in the Premier League, and also broke the record as Chelsea's youngest-ever player in the Premier League era.

== International career ==
In October 2025, Nicoll-Jazuli played for the England national under-17 football team for 2026 UEFA European Under-17 Championship qualification.

== Style of play ==
Nicoll-Jazuli plays as a midfielder. English news website BBC Sport wrote in 2025 "previously a reluctant centre-back, Nicoll-Jazuli moved into midfield in the under-13s and has since proved capable of playing as a number six, number eight or number 10 in midfield".

== Career statistics ==
As of 18 September 2026

Appearances and goals by club, season and competition
Club	Season	League			FA Cup		EFL Cup		Europe		Other		Total	
Club	Season	Division	Apps	Goals	Apps	Goals	Apps	Goals	Apps	Goals	Apps	Goals	Apps	Goals
Chelsea	2026–27	Premier League	1	0	0	0	0	0	—		—		1	0
Career total			1	0	0	0	0	0	0	0	0	0	1	0

== Honours ==
Chelsea U18

- U18 Premier League National Champion: 2025–26
