= Chico Heron =

Panamanian baseball manager (1936–2007)

- Infielder / Manager
- Born: March 13, 1936; Bocas del Toro, Panama
- Died: November 23, 2007 (aged 71)
- Batted: Right Threw: Right
Medals
Manager for Panama
Men's baseball
Baseball World Cup
| Bronze medal – third place | 2005 Holland | Team |
Intercontinental Cup
| Disqualified | 2002 Havana | Team (Note: Bronze medal stripped due to doping.) |
Central American and Caribbean Games
| Silver medal – second place | 2002 San Salvador | Team |
| Bronze medal – third place | 1982 Havana | Team |
Bolivarian Games
| Gold medal – first place | 2001 Guayaquil | Team |
| Silver medal – second place | 1981 Barquisimeto | Team |

Karl San José Heron (Note: Often given as Carlos Heron.) (March 13, 1936 — November 23, 2007), nicknamed Chico, was a Panamanian professional baseball player, scout, and manager. He scouted for the New York Yankees and is credited with discovering Mariano Rivera. Heron was also a longtime manager of the Panama national team.

== Playing career ==
Heron played with several independent minor league teams in the United States in the mid 1950s, including in the Mountain States League, Cotton States League, and the West Texas–New Mexico League. He played for Amarillo Gold Sox in the Western League in 1956 and the Sacramento Solons of the Pacific Coast League in 1957. The next year, Heron played with Williamsport Grays (then a Philadelphia Phillies affiliate), and returned to Triple-A Sacramento (affiliated with the Milwaukee Braves) in 1959. In 1960 he played in the San Francisco Giants system, reaching Triple-A Tacoma, and split his time in 1961 between the Phillies and Baltimore Orioles organizations. His career in organized baseball ended in 1962 with the Tri-City Braves of the Northwest League.

During this time, he also played in the Panamanian Professional Baseball League, debuting with Chesterfield in 1957. Heron played the rest of his professional career in Panama with various clubs: Azucareros de Coclé, Chiriquí-Bocas, Ron Santa Clara, Cerveza Balboa, Panalit, and Guardia Nacional. With Azucareros de Coclé, he participated in the 1959 Caribbean Series, where he went 7–for–24 (.292) with two doubles and two runs batted in.

== Managerial career ==
Heron managed Chiriquí to its first national championship in Panama's amateur league in 1978. He repeated the feat in 1979. He won another title with Herrera in 1997, and in 2001 as assistant to Aníbal Relúz on the Panamá Metro team.

Heron was a longtime manager of the Panama national baseball team, starting with the 1981 Intercontinental Cup in Edmonton, and the 1981 Bolivarian Games in Barquisimeto, Venezuela (earning a silver medal). He managed Panama to a historic upset over Cuba at the 1982 Central American and Caribbean Games, earning the team a third place finish. Heron managed Panama at various other international tournaments, including the Pan American Games on 1983 (in Venezuela) and 1999 (in Canada).

Under Heron, Panama's second place finish at the 2002 Central American and Caribbean Games was the country's best performance in 64 years. Shortly after, though, Heron's bronze medal at the 2002 Intercontinental Cup was stripped after it was found several Panamanian players (including Roberto Kelly) tested positive for performance-enhancing substances. Nevertheless, Heron's crowning achievement as manager came in 2005 Baseball World Cup in Taiwan, where he led the team to a bronze.

As a scout, Heron is best known for discovering future Hall of Famer Mariano Rivera, who signed with the New York Yankees. Heron first saw Rivera play as a shortstop for a Panamanian amateur team and later watched him pitch as a 20-year old in 1990. He subsequently recommended Herb Raybourn sign him, resulting in Rivera signing with the Yankees for a $2,000 bonus. Heron eventually became a mentor for Rivera, who described him as a second father figure. Other major league players scouted by Heron include Mariano's cousin Rubén Rivera, as well as Ramiro Mendoza, Fernando Seguignol, and Rafael Medina.
