= Operation Chico =

1958 Civil Defense exercise in California, US

Operation Chico was a Civil Defense exercise conducted from December 6 to 7, 1958, which consisted of a strategic evacuation of approximately 500 families from Solano County, California to the city of Chico, California, and overnight care for the evacuees. The purpose of Operation Chico was to test protection measures against atomic bomb fallout and other major disasters.

The plan was designed to test: a) the feasibility of an evacuation route designated in 1955 for Solano County exclusive of the city of Vallejo; b) plans for the control of a sizable group of evacuees; c) registration and assignment to billets of such a group; d) mass feeding facilities and operations; and e) plans and procedures for continuity of governments of evacuated jurisdictions.

An "emergency" reception base was set up at the Silver Dollar Fairgrounds in Chico. The evacuees were registered and assigned billets with private families for one night. The test was the first mass evacuation in the United States in which residents were quartered away from their homes overnight. The evacuation was scheduled to occur on the anniversary of Pearl Harbor.

The operation was observed by top national and state civil defense officials and was declared a complete success. Chico was subsequently named as the provisional capital of California in the event that Sacramento needed to be evacuated.

== Criticism ==
Carl E. Hein, assistant professor of history at what was then Chico State College paid for an ad titled "A Test of What" that disputed the operation’s credibility. There was no panic that might have altered the "successful" evacuation of Solano County and the parade-like atmosphere became a subject of controversy.

In his ad, he pointed out that the evacuation of U.S. cities following a nuclear bomb would be impossible because shortly after an alarm had been sounded, bottlenecks would completely choke up the highways, and there would almost certainly be widespread panic.

He went on to say that indulging in fantasy operations such as Operation Chico would only obscure the real dangers that threaten mankind if we assumed that exercises like this would provide protection against nuclear disaster.
