= Sociedade Esportiva Nacional =

Nacional
- Full name: Sociedade Esportiva Nacional
- Founded: November 1, 2002
- Ground: Binezão, Santa Inês, Maranhão state, Brazil
- Capacity: 9,146
Home colours	Away colours

Sociedade Esportiva Nacional, commonly known as Nacional, is a Brazilian football club based in Santa Inês, Maranhão state.

== History ==
The club was founded on December 21, 2002. Nacional finished as runners-up in the Campeonato Maranhense Second Level in 2006. Since 2007, the club competes in the Campeonato Maranhense.

== Stadium ==
Sociedade Esportiva Nacional play their home games at Estádio Artemas Santos, nicknamed Binezão. The stadium has a maximum capacity of 9,146 people.
