= Chicão (footballer, born December 1979) =

Brazilian footballer

Personal information
- Full name: José João de Jesus
- Date of birth: 17 December 1979 (age 46)
- Place of birth: Tobias Barreto, Brazil
- Height: 1.68 m (5 ft 6 in)
- Position: Midfielder

Senior career*
Years	Team	Apps	(Gls)
- Confiança
- XV de Piracicaba
- Guarani
- Flamengo-SP
1999–2001	Botafogo-SP		
- Inter de Limeira
- * Club domestic league appearances and goals

José João de Jesus (born 17 December 1979), commonly known as Chicão, is a Brazilian former footballer who played as a midfielder, most notably for Botafogo-SP. He is the father of Chelsea forward João Pedro.

== Club career ==
Born in Tobias Barreto, Sergipe, Chicão played for Confiança, XV de Piracicaba, Guarani, Flamengo-SP, Botafogo-SP and Inter de Limeira. He is best known for his time at Botafogo-SP, with whom he appeared in the 1999 and 2001 Campeonato Brasileiro.

In 2001, he was one of the leading players in Botafogo-SP's run to the final of the Campeonato Paulista, which the club lost to Corinthians. He was praised by Vanderlei Luxemburgo and was linked with a move to Corinthians, but his career was interrupted by his arrest in 2002.

== Arrests ==
In 2002, Chicão was arrested in connection with a fatal shooting in Iracemápolis, São Paulo, and was accused of being an accomplice to the killing. According to the police investigation, the shooter stated that Chicão had persuaded him to carry out the killing after a confrontation; Chicão said he did not know the man was armed. He denied involvement throughout the proceedings, and was sentenced to 16 years in prison. After serving eight years, he was released on parole on 25 August 2010 and sought to resume his football career, with Botafogo-SP offering him a place if he did not find another club.

Speaking after his release, Chicão said: "Eu me arrependo pelo que fiz e já paguei" ("I regret what I did and I have already paid"). He said that prison had changed him, that he believed he deserved a second chance, and that he felt the victim's family had forgiven him; he also said he had become an evangelical Christian and had kept playing futsal in prison in the hope of returning to professional football.

In August 2011, Chicão was arrested by military police in his hometown of Tobias Barreto after residents reported being threatened with a firearm; police stated that a .38-calibre revolver and six rounds of ammunition were found in his possession.

== Personal life ==
Chicão is the father of Chelsea forward João Pedro, who was born in Ribeirão Preto in 2001. He and João Pedro's mother had separated by the time of his imprisonment.

== Career statistics ==
=== Club ===
Club	Season	League			State League		Cup		Other		Total	
Club	Season	Division	Apps	Goals	Apps	Goals	Apps	Goals	Apps	Goals	Apps	Goals
Botafogo-SP	1999	Série A	2	0	0	0	0	0	0	0	2	0
Botafogo-SP	2001	Série A	10	0	12 (Note: Appearances in the Campeonato Paulista)	0	0	0	0	0	22	0
Career total			12	0	12	0	0	0	0	0	24	0
