= Chico River =

Chico River may refer to:

In Argentina:

- Chico River (Gallegos)
- Chico River (Lower Chubut)
- Chico River (Patagonia)
- Chico River (Santa Cruz)
- Chico River (Upper Chubut)

Elsewhere:

- Chico River (Sucre), Bolivia
- Chico River (Panama)
- Chico River (Philippines)
- Chico River (Puerto Rico)

== See also ==
- Río Chico (disambiguation)
- Arapey Chico River
- Ibirapuitã Chico River
- Olimar Chico River
- Queguay Chico River
- Sauce Chico River
- Chico Creek, Colorado
