= El Chico =

El Chico may refer to:

- El Chico (restaurant), a Mexican restaurant chain started in Dallas, Texas
- El Chico, Florida, an unincorporated community in Monroe County
- El Chico (album) a 1966 album by Chico Hamilton
