= Olutayo Subuloye =

English footballer (born 2007)

Personal information
- Full name: Olutayo Peter Gabriel Subuloye
- Date of birth: 18 December 2007 (age 18)
- Place of birth: Eastbourne, England
- Height: 1.96 m (6 ft 5 in)
- Position: Defender

Team information
- Current team: Chelsea
- Number: 37

Youth career
- Brighton
- Chelsea

International career^{‡}
Years	Team	Apps	(Gls)
2024	England U18	1	(0)
- ‡ National team caps and goals as of 14 October 2024

Olutayo Peter Gabriel Subuloye (born 18 December 2007) is an English professional footballer who plays as a defender for Chelsea.

== Early life ==
Subuloye was born on 18 December 2007. Born in Eastbourne, England, he is a native of Sussex, England.

== Club career ==
As a youth player, Subuloye joined the youth academy of Brighton at under-10 level after receiving interest from the youth academy of Premier League side Arsenal.

Following his stint there, he joined the youth academy of Premier League side Chelsea at under-12 level, where he played in the UEFA Youth League and helped the club's under-17 team win the 2023–24 U17 Premier League Cup. In 2024, he signed his first professional contract with them. In 2026, he was promoted to the Blue's senior team.

== International career ==
Subuloye is an England youth international and has represented the country internationally at under-18 level and is eligible to represent Nigeria internationally through his parents.

On 11 October 2024, he debuted for the England national under-18 football team during a 0–2 away friendly loss to the Sweden national under-18 football team.
