= Río Chico =

Río Chico may refer to the following places:

== Argentina ==
- Río Chico, Río Negro, a village and municipality in Río Negro Province
- Río Chico Department, Tucumán
- Río Chico Department, Santa Cruz
- Chico River (Santa Cruz)
- Río Chico de Nono

== Chile ==
- Río Chico (Chile)

== Venezuela ==
- Río Chico, Venezuela, a city in Páez municipality
- Río Chico (parish), in the municipality of Páez, Miranda

== See also ==
- Chico River (disambiguation)
