= Volkswagen Chico =

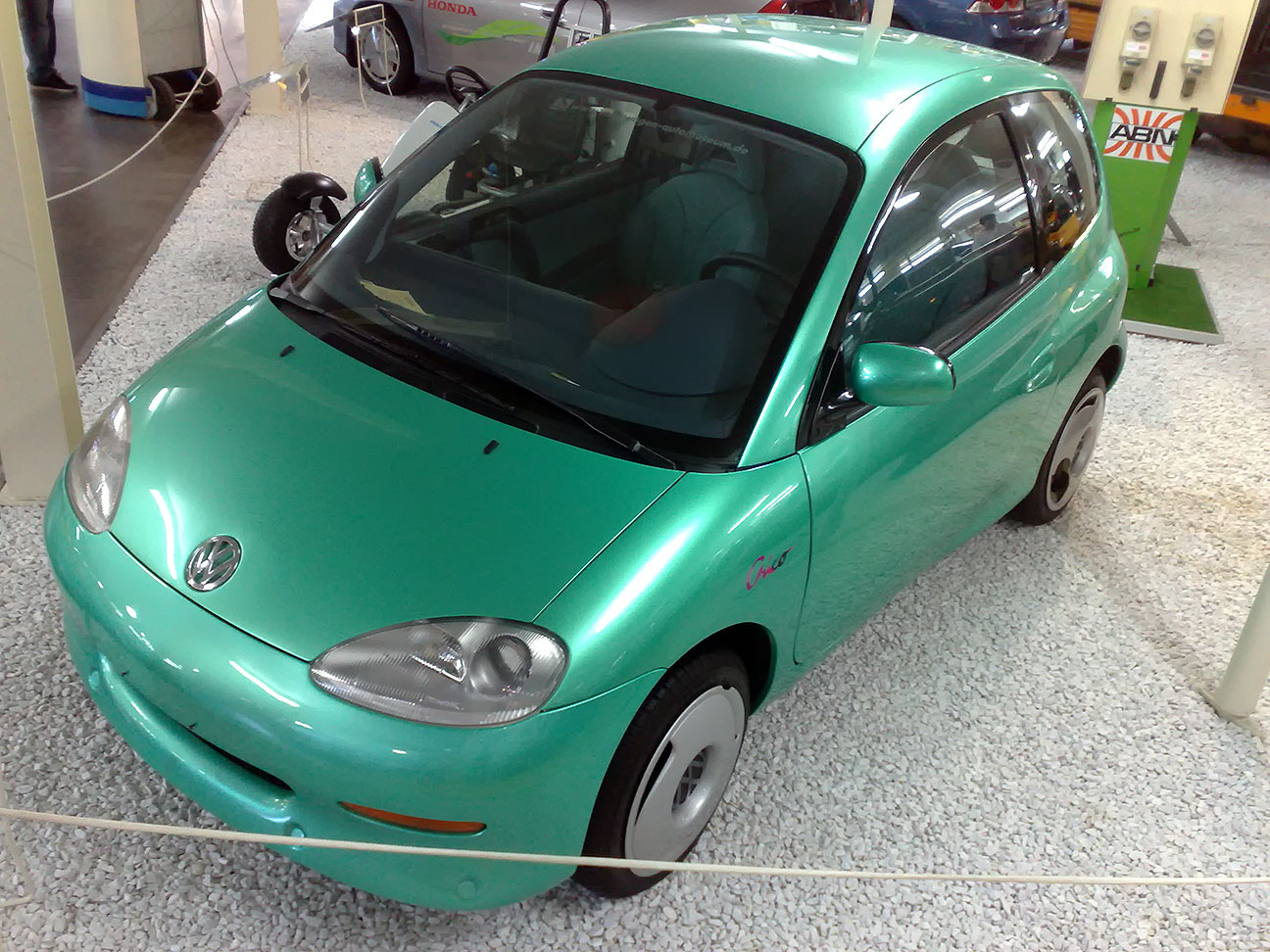

Overview
- Manufacturer: Volkswagen
- Production: 1992

Body and chassis
- Class: Concept car
- Body style: 2+2 hatchback

Powertrain
- Engine: 34 PS (25 kW) two-cylinder

The Volkswagen Chico is a concept car made by Volkswagen in the summer of 1992. It was a study for a small 2+2 hatchback, and was powered by two engines: a 34 PS (25 kW) two-cylinder engine and an 8 PS (5.9 kW) electric motor, which could work in tandem for a boost in power. The Chico was never developed into any production model.

Volkswagen had previously used the name Chicco (with a double 'c') on another project car from 1975, which was of a similar size.

Chico was proposed as the name for an upcoming city car based on the Volkswagen up! concept car, which had been expected to be launched in the United States and the United Kingdom in July 2012. This would have been the smallest model of the up! range, with two doors and two seats.

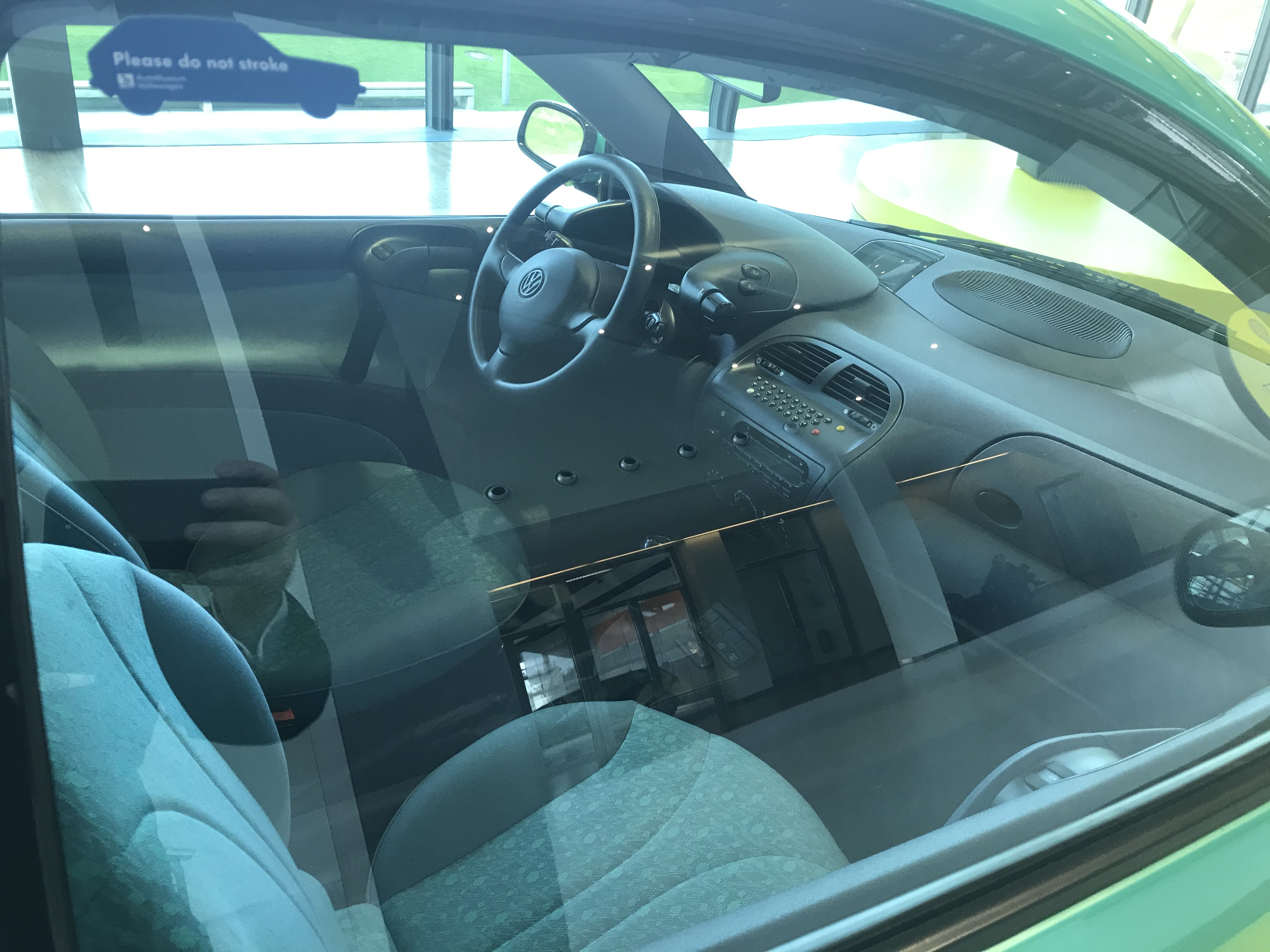
Interior

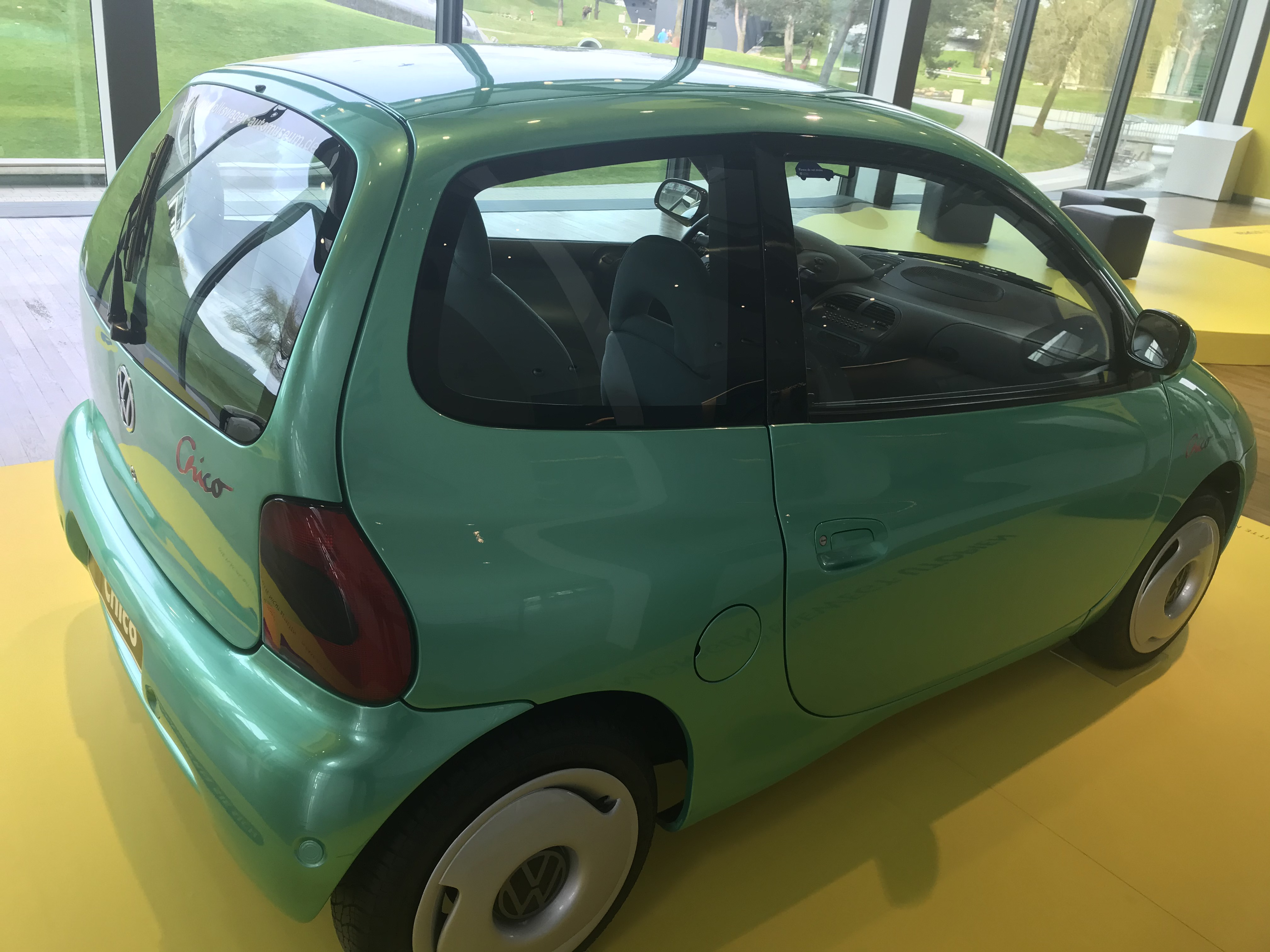
Exterior
