= Pentling =

- Municipality
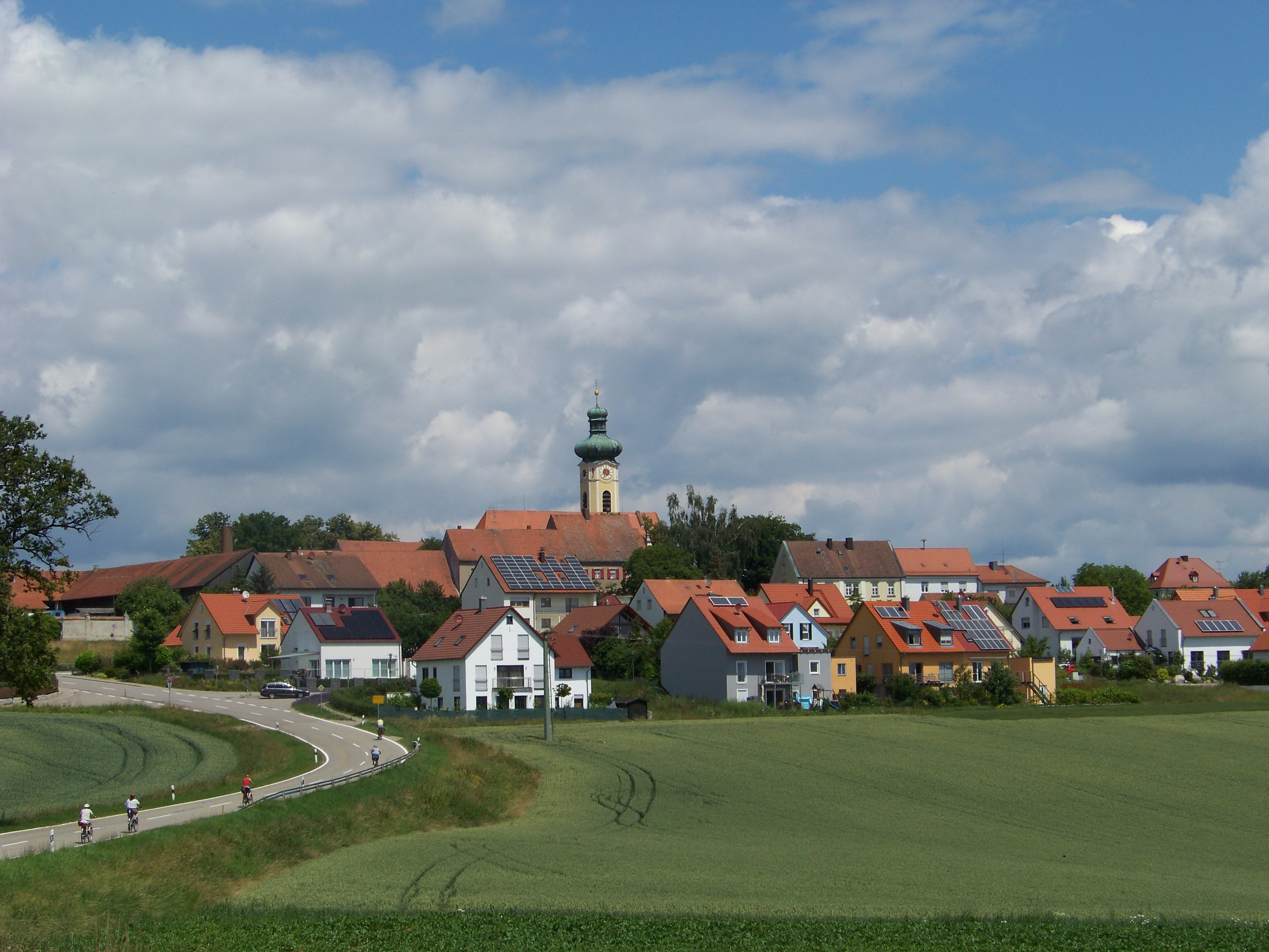
- Hohengebraching, part of Pentling

- Coat of arms

- Location of Pentling within Regensburg district
- Interactive map of Pentling
- Location within Germany Location within Bavaria
- Coordinates: 48°59′01″N 12°03′32″E
- Country: Germany
- State: Bavaria
- Admin. region: Oberpfalz
- District: Regensburg

Government
  - Mayor (2020–26): Barbara Wilhelm

Area
  - Total: 32.38 km^{2} (12.50 sq mi)
- Elevation: 408 m (1,339 ft)

Population (2025-12-31)
  - Total: 6,404
  - Density: 197.8/km^{2} (512.2/sq mi)
- Time zone: UTC+01:00 (CET)
  - Summer (DST): UTC+02:00 (CEST)
- Postal codes: 93080
- Dialling codes: 0941, 09405
- Vehicle registration: R
- Website: www.pentling.de

Pentling (German pronunciation: [ˈpɛntlɪŋ]; Bavarian: Bendling) is a municipality in the Regensburg district of Bavaria in Germany. It lies on the river Danube.

Pope Emeritus Benedict XVI lived there from 1969 and maintained his house there until his death on the last day of 2022.
