= Alfie Gilchrist =

English footballer (born 2003)

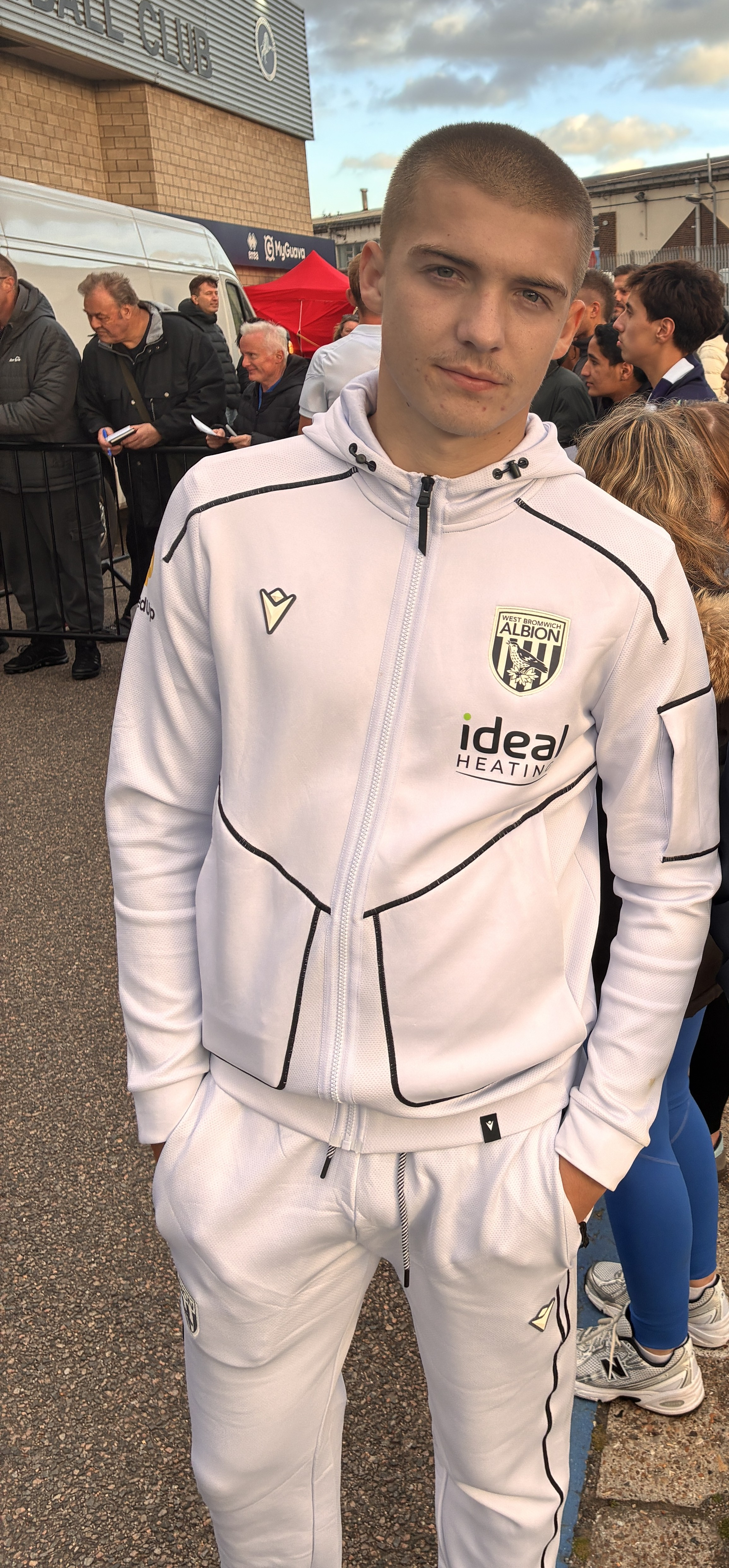
- Gilchrist with West Bromwich Albion in 2025.

Personal information
- Full name: Alfie Gilchrist
- Date of birth: 28 November 2003 (age 22)
- Place of birth: Kingston upon Thames, England
- Height: 1.84 m (6 ft 0 in)
- Position: Right-back

Team information
- Current team: Leyton Orient (on loan from West Bromwich Albion)
- Number: 12

Youth career
- –2014: Queens Park Rangers
- 2014–2023: Chelsea

Senior career*
Years	Team	Apps	(Gls)
2023–2025	Chelsea	11	(1)
2024–2025	→ Sheffield United (loan)	30	(0)
2025–	West Bromwich Albion	13	(0)
2026–	→ Leyton Orient (loan)	6	(0)
- * Club domestic league appearances and goals as of 12:00, 25 October 2026 (UTC)

Alfie Gilchrist (born 28 November 2003) is an English professional footballer who plays as a right-back for EFL League One club Leyton Orient, on loan from EFL Championship club West Bromwich Albion.

== Club career ==
=== Early career ===
Born in Kingston upon Thames, London, Gilchrist started his career at local side Old Isleworthians Youth F.C. and Queens Park Rangers, playing as a right-wing and central midfielder in his early teens.

=== Chelsea ===
Gilchrist joined Chelsea at under-11 level in 2014 and was deployed as a centre-back. He was compared to John Terry and saw him as an idol due to his position and his status as an academy player of Chelsea.

Gilchrist signed his first professional contract in November 2020. He captained the academy team that reached the FA Youth Cup semi-finals and also won the Under-18 Premier League Cup in 2021–22 season. Gilchrist took over captain duties for the Under-23s in February 2023. He was nominated for the PL2 Player of the Season award in the 2022–23 season.

On 26 May 2023, Gilchrist was named among the substitutes for a Premier League tie with Manchester United. He was included in Chelsea's pre-season tour squad in preparation for the 2023–24 season, and came on as a substitute at half-time in a 5–0 win against Wrexham.

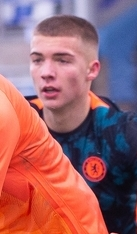
Gilchrist in the UEFA Youth League in 2021

On 19 September 2023, he signed a new contract with the club until June 2025. On 27 December, Gilchrist made his senior debut, subbed-on in stoppage time, in a 2–1 win against Crystal Palace in the Premier League. Gilchrist's first start for the senior squad came on 6 January 2024, in Chelsea's 4–0 defeat of Preston North End in the FA Cup.

On 2 April 2024, Gilchrist signed a new contract with Chelsea, keeping him at the club until 2026.

On 15 April 2024, after coming on as an 88th-minute substitute for Malo Gusto, Gilchrist scored his first goal for Chelsea in a 6–0 win over Everton.

==== Loan to Sheffield United ====
On 7 August 2024, Gilchrist was loaned out to Championship side Sheffield United on a season-long deal. He made his debut for the club on 10 August in the league in a 2–0 win against Preston North End. Gilchrist would make 30 appearances in the Championship for Sheffield United, keeping 15 cleansheets as they finished 3rd on 90 points, reaching the play-off final, though Gilchrist wouldn't be in the squad for United's 2–1 loss to Sunderland.

=== West Bromwich Albion ===
On 29 August 2025, Gilchrist signed for West Bromwich Albion on a four-year contract. Gilchrist made his first appearance for West Brom on 1 October as an 85th-minute substitute in a 1–0 away win against Norwich City.

==== Leyton Orient (loan) ====
On 11 August 2026, Gilchrist joined League One club Leyton Orient on a season-long loan deal.

== Personal life ==
Gilchrist is a boyhood Chelsea fan, as his grandfather and father used to be season ticket holders. He attended Esher Church of England High School in Esher.

== Career statistics ==
As of end of 2025–26 season

Appearances and goals by club, season and competition
Club	Season	League			FA Cup		EFL Cup		Other		Total	
Club	Season	Division	Apps	Goals	Apps	Goals	Apps	Goals	Apps	Goals	Apps	Goals
Chelsea U21	2021–22	—			—		—		3 (Note: Appearances in EFL Trophy)	0	3	0
Chelsea U21	2022–23	—			—		—		4	0	4	0
Chelsea U21	2023–24	—			—		—		2	0	2	0
Chelsea U21	Total		—		—		—		9	0	9	0
Chelsea	2023–24	Premier League	11	1	4	0	2	0	—		17	1
Sheffield United (loan)	2024–25	Championship	30	0	1	0	1	0	0	0	32	0
West Bromwich Albion	2025–26	Championship	13	0	2	0	—		—		15	0
West Bromwich Albion	2026–27	Championship	0	0	0	0	0	0	—		0	0
West Bromwich Albion	Total		13	0	2	0	0	0	0	0	15	0
Leyton Orient (loan)	2026–27	League One	0	0	0	0	0	0	0	0	0	0
Career total			54	1	7	0	3	0	9	0	73	1

== Honours ==
Chelsea

- EFL Cup runner-up: 2023–24

Individual

- Chelsea's Academy Player of the Season: 2024
