= Enzo Fernández =

Argentine footballer (born 2001)

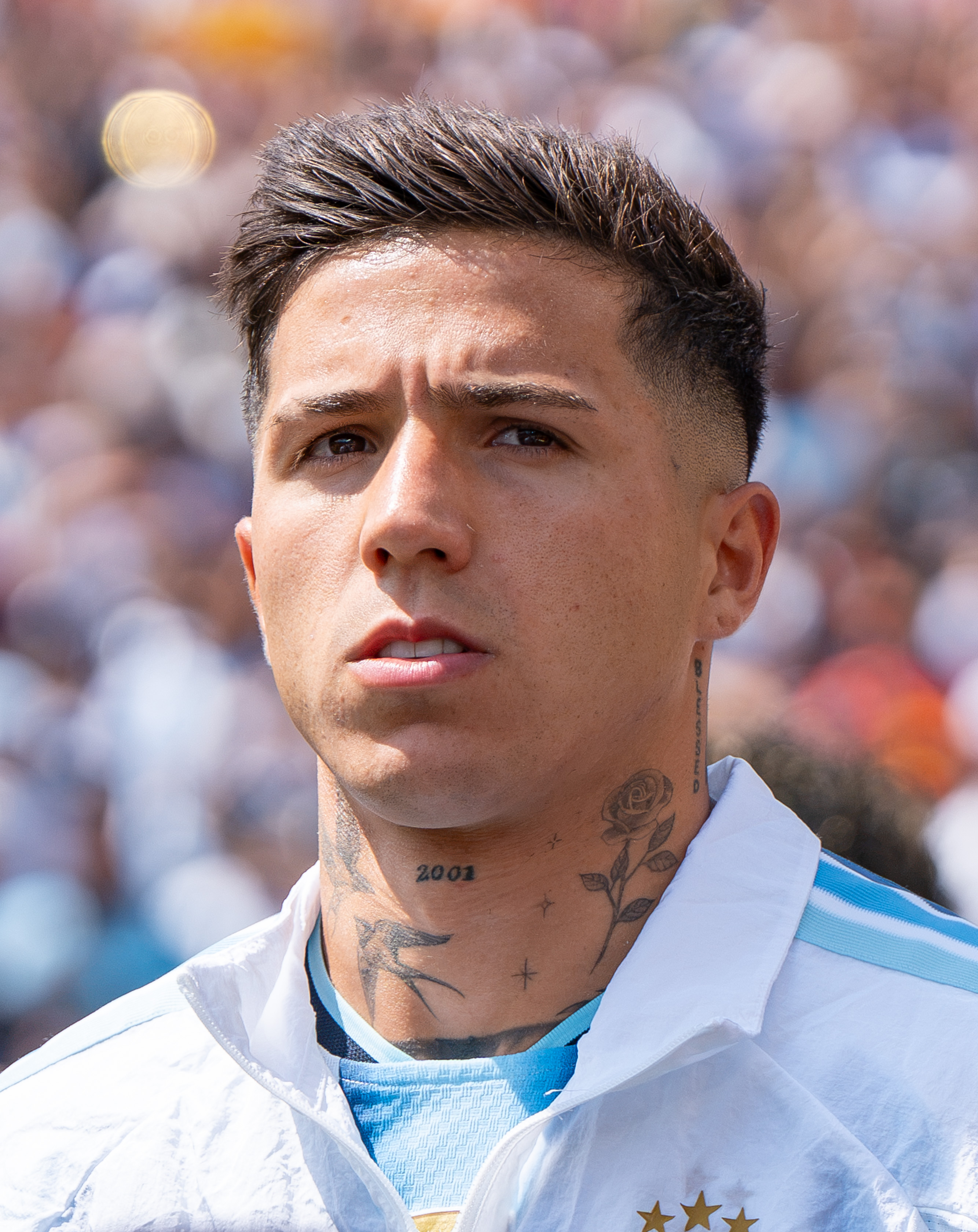
- Fernández with Argentina in 2026

Personal information
- Full name: Enzo Jeremías Fernández
- Date of birth: 17 January 2001 (age 25)
- Place of birth: San Martín, Buenos Aires, Argentina
- Height: 1.78 m (5 ft 10 in)
- Position: Midfielder

Team information
- Current team: Manchester City
- Number: 17

Youth career
- Club La Recova
- 2007–2019: River Plate

Senior career*
Years	Team	Apps	(Gls)
2019–2022	River Plate	40	(10)
2020–2021	→ Defensa y Justicia (loan)	14	(0)
2022–2023	Benfica	17	(1)
2023–2026	Chelsea	119	(19)
2026–	Manchester City	7	(1)

International career^{‡}
2019	Argentina U18	2	(0)
2022–	Argentina	51	(8)
Medal record
Men's football
Representing Argentina
FIFA World Cup
Winner	2022 Qatar
Runner-up	2026 Canada–Mexico–US
Copa América
Winner	2024 United States
- * Club domestic league appearances and goals as of 23:23, 31 October 2026 (UTC) ‡ National team caps and goals as of 03:35, 7 October 2026 (UTC)

Enzo Jeremías Fernández (born 17 January 2001) is an Argentine professional footballer who plays as a midfielder for Premier League club Manchester City and the Argentina national team.

As an academy graduate of River Plate, Fernández made his first-team debut for the club in 2019, before spending two seasons on loan with Defensa y Justicia. There, he won the Copa Sudamericana and Recopa Sudamericana, and returned to River Plate in 2021. He joined Benfica in the summer of 2022. Having played only six months for them, he joined Chelsea in January 2023 for a British-record transfer fee worth €121 million (£106.8 million). In September 2026, Fernández joined Manchester City for £125 million, equalling the existing British transfer fee record. The move made Fernández the first player to be transferred for more than £100 million on two separate occasions.

An Argentine international, Fernández previously represented his country at under-18 level before making his senior international debut. He represented Argentina at the 2022 FIFA World Cup, playing an important role in helping his country win their third title, while also winning the tournament's Young Player Award. He was also part of the team that won the 2024 Copa América. Fernández was a key player in Argentina's campaign to reach the 2026 FIFA World Cup final, where he received a red card.

== Club career ==
=== River Plate ===
==== Early career ====
Born in San Martín, Buenos Aires, to Raúl and Marta; Fernández has four brothers, Seba, Rodri, Maxi and Gonza. He was introduced to football at a young age, playing for a local side called Club La Recova, before joining River Plate. It is unclear exactly when Fernández joined River Plate; in November 2019, in an interview for the River Plate website, he claimed to have joined the academy in 2005, in September 2020, Argentine newspaper Clarín reported that he joined River in 2006, while in February 2023, he claimed he was six when he joined in an interview for the Chelsea website, which would have most likely been in 2007.

Fernández progressed through the youth ranks, and was promoted into the club's first-team by manager Marcelo Gallardo on 27 January 2019, in a 3–1 home loss to Patronato in the Primera División, despite remaining on the bench. He made his first-team debut on 4 March 2020, replacing Santiago Sosa in the 75th minute of a 3–0 loss to LDU Quito in the Copa Libertadores. In the weeks prior, he scored once, in the 6–1 thrashing of Libertad, in four games at the 2020 U-20 Copa Libertadores in Paraguay.

==== 2020–21: Loan to Defensa y Justicia ====
Despite being sporadically used Fernández's manager advised him to leave the club on loan, in order to continue his development. In August, Fernández was loaned to fellow top-flight club Defensa y Justicia. He made his debut for the Halcón on 18 September by manager Hernán Crespo in a 3–0 win over Delfín in the Copa Libertadores. Despite initially not being a starter, his performances impressed his manager and eventually he earned a place in the team, helping the club win the 2020 Copa Sudamericana, starting in the 3–0 win over fellow Argentinian side Lanús in the final, winning his first career title.

==== 2021–22: First-team breakthrough ====
After impressing on loan, Fernández returned to River Plate, during the season at the request of manager Marcelo Gallardo, making his return on 15 July 2021, in the first leg of Copa Libertadores round-of-16, featuring in the 1–1 home draw to fellow Argentinian side Argentinos Juniors. He immediately became a starter and on 14 August, he scored his first goal for the club and provided an assist in a 2–0 win over Vélez Sarsfield in the Primera División. On 20 December, he agreed to a contract extension to 2025. Following a promising start in the 2022 season, which he scored eight goals and provided six assists in 19 games, Fernández was named the best active footballer in Argentina, being subsequently scouted by a number of established European teams.

=== Benfica ===
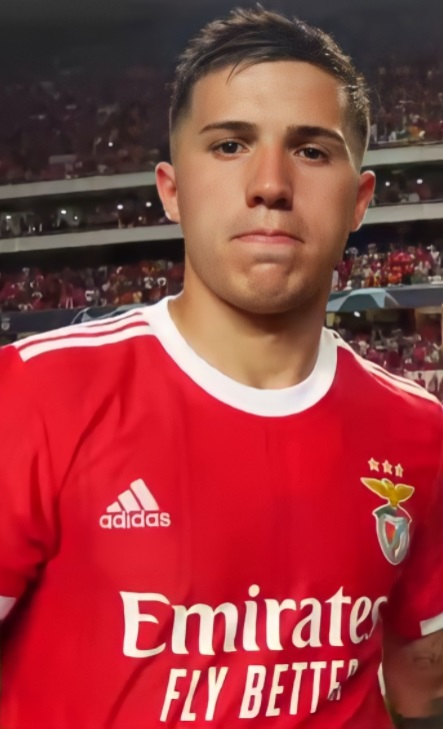
Fernández with Benfica in 2022

On 23 June 2022, River Plate reached an agreement with Primeira Liga team Benfica for the transfer of Fernández for a €10 million fee for 75% of his economic rights plus €8 million in add-ons, but with the player remaining at River Plate until the end of the club's Copa Libertadores campaign. Following River Plate's round of 16 exit from the Copa Libertadores, on 14 July, Benfica confirmed the deal, giving Fernández the number 13 shirt, previously worn by club legend Eusébio.

He made his debut for the club on 2 August, scoring his first goal for the club, a half-volley from outside the penalty area, in a 4–1 home win over Midtjylland in the first leg of the 2022–23 UEFA Champions League third qualifying round. He then scored in Benfica's next matches: a 4–0 home win over Arouca in the Primeira Liga, and a 3–1 away win over Midtjylland in the second leg of the UEFA Champions League third qualifying round. His impressive performances continued throughout the month and following a run of five consecutive wins and three clean sheets, he was named the Primeira Liga's Midfielder of the Month, a feat which was repeated for the months of October and November.

=== Chelsea ===
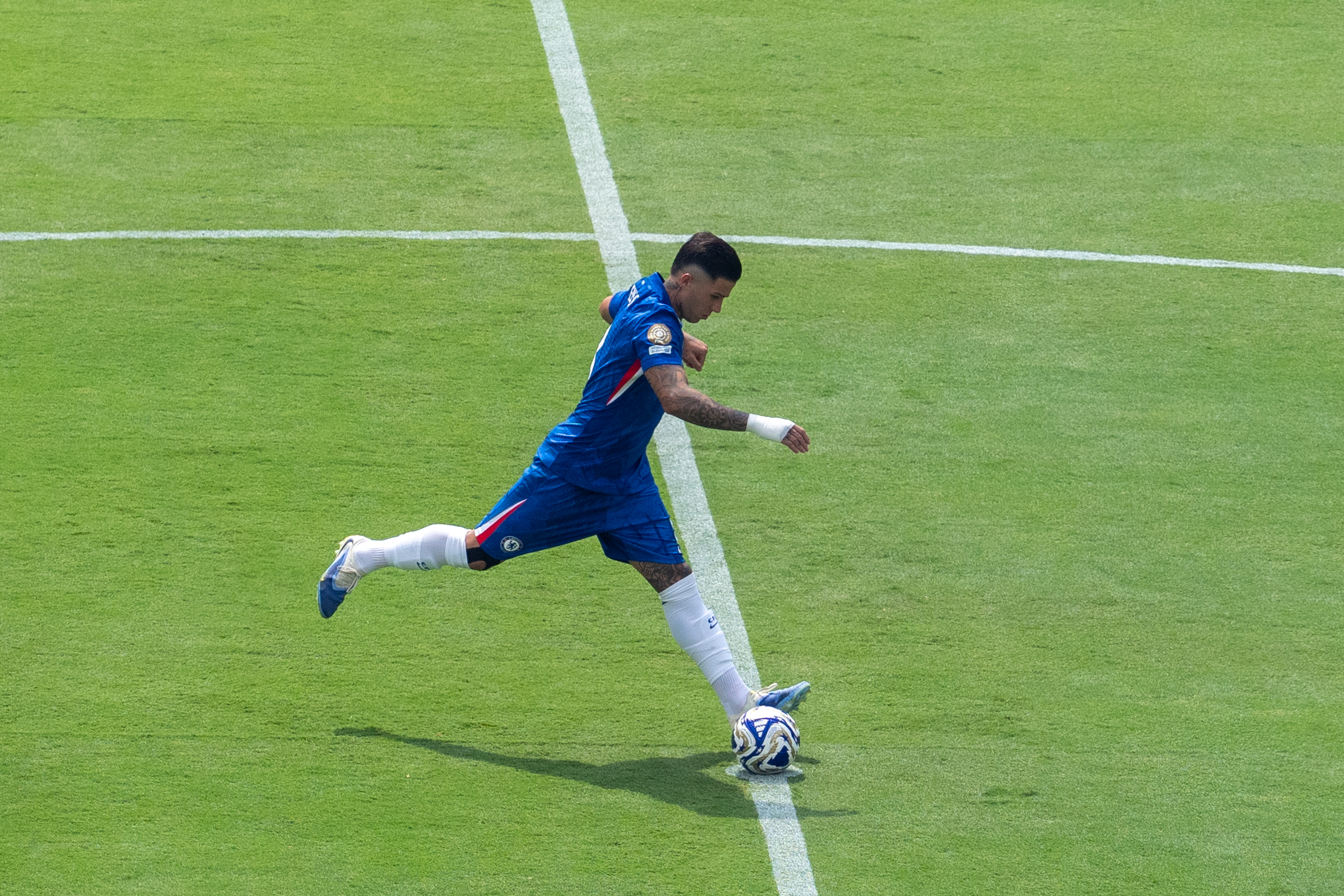
Fernández taking a kick at the start of the FIFA Club World Cup final

Following Fernández's success internationally at the 2022 FIFA World Cup, he was linked with a move to Premier League teams Chelsea and Liverpool in the January 2023 transfer window, however, Benfica were adamant he wouldn't be sold for less than his €121m release clause. After negotiations lasting some ten hours and led by CFC co-owner Behdad Eghbali, the two clubs, on 31 January 2023, the last day of the Premier League's transfer window, came to an agreement and Fernández signed an eight-and-a-half-year contract, valid until 2031, with Chelsea, whose financial package reportedly was worth a total of £106.8 million. The transfer fee paid by Chelsea was, at the time, a British-record transfer deal. Benfica received an initial £30 million installment that will be followed by five more.

Fernández made his debut in the Premier League on 3 February in a home goal-less draw against Fulham, playing the full game. On 11 February, he registered an assist for the team's only goal in a 1–1 league draw at West Ham United. He scored his first goal for Chelsea in a 2–1 win over AFC Wimbledon in the second round of the EFL Cup on 30 August 2023. He scored his first Premier League goals on 3 December, by netting a brace in a 3–2 home victory over Brighton & Hove Albion.

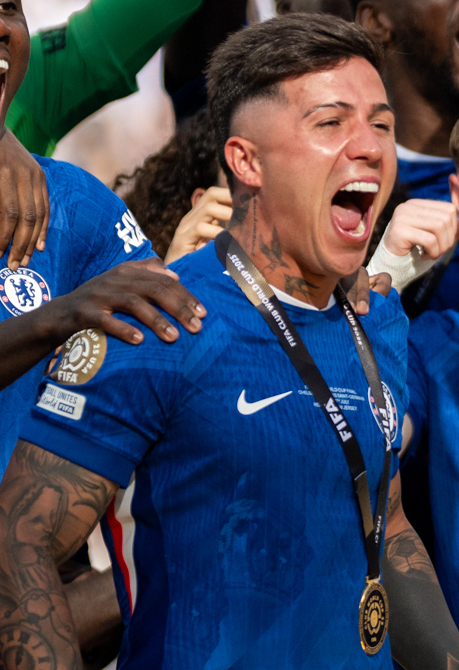
Fernández celebrating Chelsea's 2025 FIFA Club World Cup victory

On 28 May 2025, Fernández scored Chelsea's opening goal in a 4–1 victory over Real Betis in the Conference League final, helping them become the first team to have won all four major European competitions. Six weeks later, he started in Chelsea's 3–0 victory over Paris Saint-Germain in the 2025 FIFA Club World Cup final.

On 31 January 2026, on his 150th appearance for Chelsea, Fernández scored in the second minute of injury time to secure a 3–2 win over West Ham after the home team was 0–2 down at half-time. Later that year, on 26 April, he scored the only goal in a 1–0 win over Leeds United, securing the club's 17th appearance in an FA Cup final.

=== Manchester City ===
On 1 September 2026, Enzo Fernández completed a move to Manchester City on transfer deadline day, joining the club for a reported British-record-equalling £125 million fee and signing a contract through 2031. The deal saw Fernández become the first player in football history to command transfer fees of more than £100 million on two separate occasions. His arrival also brought him back together with former Chelsea manager Enzo Maresca. Fernández was assigned the number 17 shirt, notably one previously worn by club legend Kevin De Bruyne. He made his debut for the club in a 1–0 home victory against Coventry City on 5 September.

On 20 September, Fernández scored his first Manchester City goal in a 5–3 win over Sunderland at the Etihad Stadium. His first Champions League goal for the club came in a 3–2 win at RB Leipzig on 4 November.

== International career ==
In July 2019, Fernández was selected by the Argentina U18s manager Esteban Solari to represent his nation at the 2019 COTIF Tournament in Spain. In November 2021, he was called up by Argentina national team manager Lionel Scaloni for two 2022 FIFA World Cup qualifiers against Brazil and Uruguay. He made his senior team debut on 24 September 2022, by coming on as a 64th-minute substitute for Leandro Paredes in a 3–0 win against Honduras.

=== 2022 World Cup title ===
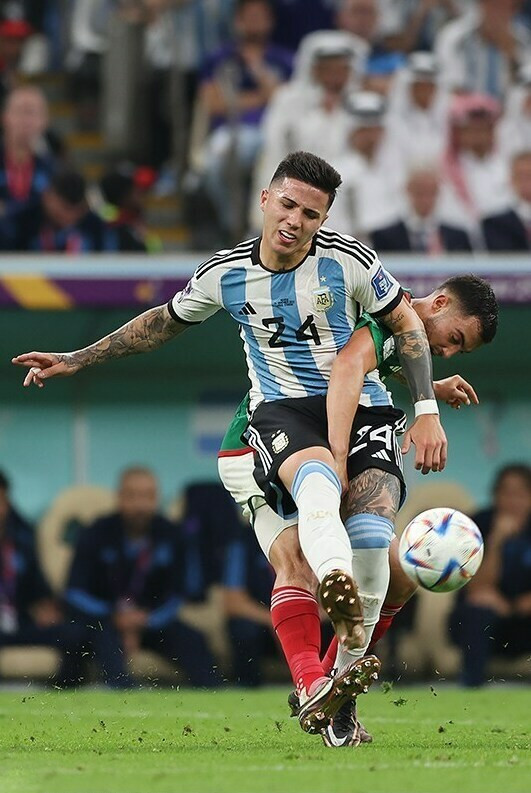
Fernández playing for Argentina at the 2022 FIFA World Cup

In November 2022, Fernández was named in Argentina's 26-man squad for the 2022 FIFA World Cup. After coming on for Guido Rodríguez in the 57th minute, on 26 November, Fernández scored his first international goal, closing Argentina's 2–0 group stage win against Mexico. In doing so, he became the second youngest player ever (only behind Lionel Messi) to score a World Cup goal for Argentina at 21 years and 313 days old. On 3 December, he became the youngest own goal scorer in the history of Argentina in the FIFA World Cup, in the round of sixteen match against Australia, when his attempt to block Craig Goodwin's shot deflected into his team's net as Argentina beat Australia 2–1. After defeating Croatia 3–0 in the semi-final, Fernández played in the final against France, where Argentina won the World Cup by a score of 4–2 on penalties after a 3–3 draw. He was named the best young player of the tournament.

=== 2024 Copa América title ===
In June 2024, Fernández was called up to represent Argentina at the 2024 Copa América. He played in all but one of their matches and recorded two assists as they went on to win the tournament, defeating Colombia 1–0 in the final and earning him his second senior international trophy.

==== July 2024 video controversy ====
In July 2024, following Argentina's Copa América triumph, a video showing Fernández and other Argentinian players chanting alleged racist chants about the origin of France national team players on the team bus surfaced, which led to outrage and criticism from the French Football Federation (FFF) and French sports minister Amélie Oudéa-Castéra. Several of Fernández's French teammates at Chelsea proceeded to unfollow him on Instagram and made posts on Twitter showing their anger, which led to Fernández apologising through Instagram. The FFF lodged a complaint to FIFA about the remarks, while Chelsea announced that it had "instigated an internal disciplinary procedure". After Fernández apologized privately to his Chelsea teammates and donated to an anti-discrimination charity, Chelsea announced that they would not be taking any disciplinary actions against him.

=== 2026 World Cup ===
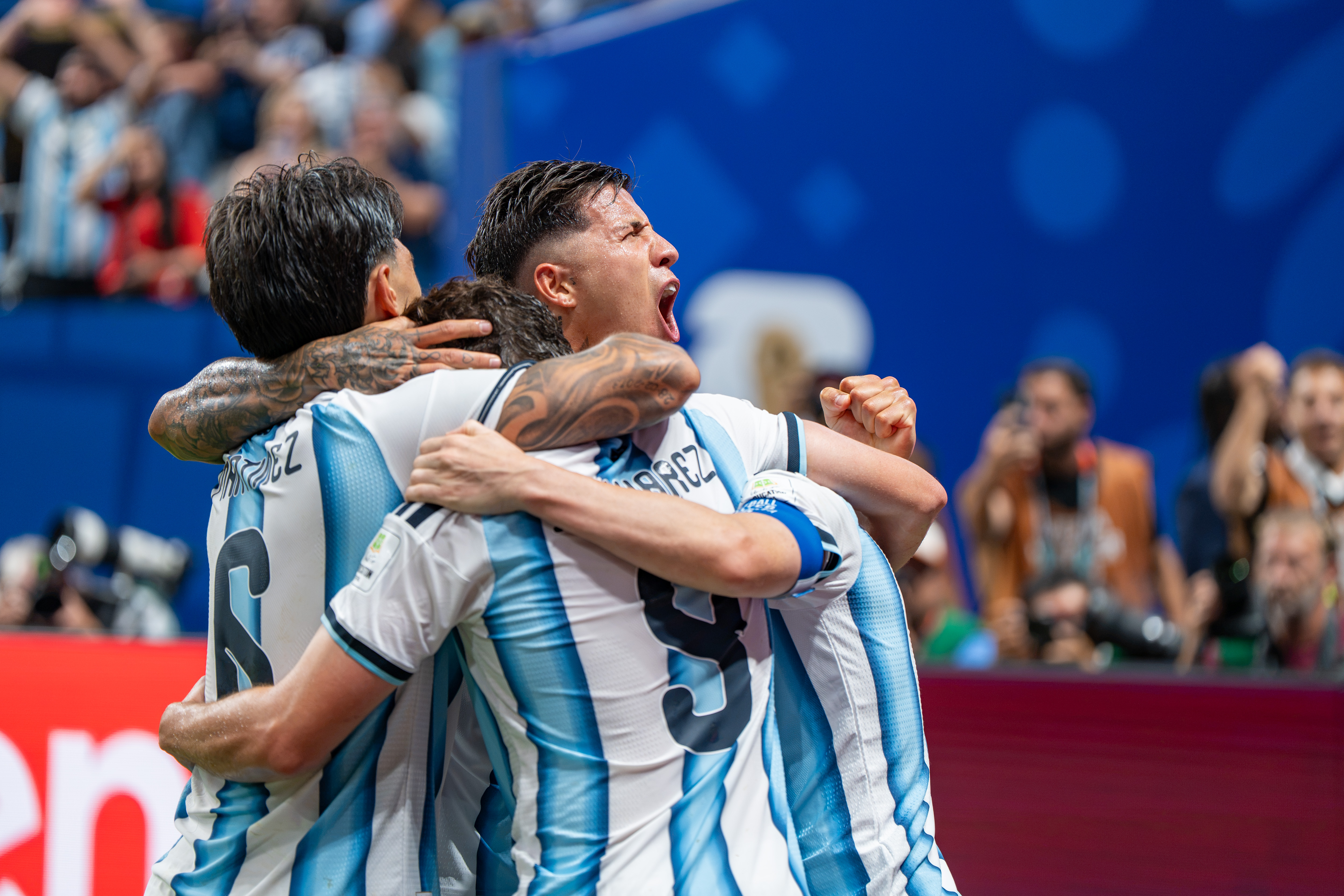
Fernández celebrating a goal with his teammates at the 2026 FIFA World Cup

In May 2026, Fernández was selected in the 26-man squad for the 2026 FIFA World Cup. He scored a stoppage-time winner in a 3–2 victory over Egypt in the round of 16, which was also the 3000th goal in FIFA World Cup history. In the semi-final against England, he levelled the score with a long-range effort before his team went on to secure a 2–1 victory. Following the match, Fernández shared a photo of himself, Lionel Messi and Leandro Paredes laughing on Instagram. He accompanied the photo with the song "Wonderwall" by Oasis – "an anthem for the England squad".

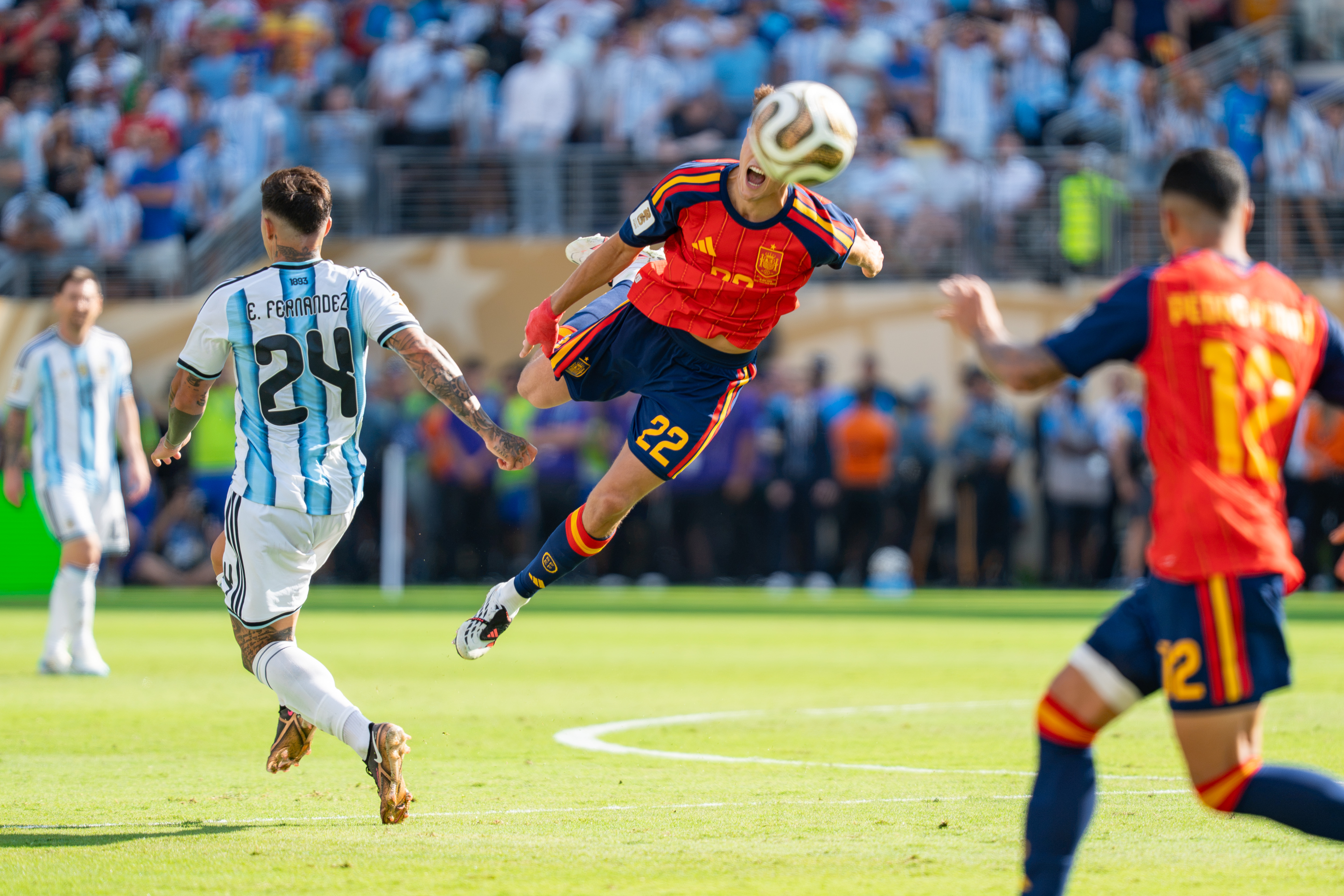
A challenge for the ball with Cubarsí resulted in Fernández receiving a second yellow card.

In the final against Spain, he was given a second yellow and a red card after he fouled the Spanish player Pau Cubarsí, becoming the first player to be sent off in a FIFA World Cup final since John Heitinga in 2010. Fernández took a couple of minutes to leave the pitch, kicking a pitch-side microphone in apparent frustration. Argentina then lost the game 1–0 in extra time. Many media sources criticised Fernández's World Cup antics; Oliver Brown of The Telegraph said that the red card was a "just ending for a brat", and called Fernández "by far the World Cup’s most dislikeable player". Joshua Robinson of The Wall Street Journal wrote that "as the tournament reached its conclusion on Sunday evening, the soccer universe came to a rare consensus", labelling Fernández "the last villain of this World Cup".

== Style of play ==
A versatile midfielder, Fernández usually plays as a deep-lying playmaker, responsible for breaking up play, dictating the tempo, and recycling possession, but he is also a capable attacking-midfielder. Although he prefers operating centrally, he can be seen occupying the left half-space assisted by a defensive midfield partner, like his former Benfica team-mate, Florentino Luís.

Fernández plays quick short passes, accurate long passes, and lobbed balls. He is combative in his midfield duels, protects spaces and his backline efficiently, and possesses good passing range and vision. He can dribble into dangerous territory or out of it. He thrives in receiving the ball in tight spaces and is press-resistant. He is adept at breaking defensive lines with his passes, playing through balls, as well as recycling possession in the midfield. Out of possession, Fernández looks to proactively disrupt opposition attack, anticipate and intercept passes.

== Personal life ==
Fernández is named after three-time Copa América winner and former River Plate player Enzo Francescoli, due to his father Raúl's fascination with the Uruguayan. He said that his favourite player is Lionel Messi.

Fernández is married to fellow Argentine Valentina Cervantes, their daughter was born in 2020 and their son was born in 2023. In October 2024, Cervantes announced their separation on an Instagram story writing (translated from Spanish) "Enzo and I have decided to take some distance from each other today. But we will always be family, and we will support each other in everything, because there are two children involved who need a lot of love from us. I know the person Enzo is, what an excellent father he is, and what heart he has. And that is enough for me. Please don't try to create conflicts where there are none." Reportedly, Fernández initiated the separation in order to enjoy the single life he missed out on in his youth. The couple reconciled in 2025.

Fernández is a Christian. He was baptized and has said, "I am a believer. God truly changed my life. He truly transformed me. My heart, honestly — He transformed it."

=== Driving infractions ===
In September 2024, Fernández was disqualified from driving for six months, receiving a 12-point penalty and being fined £3,020, following two driving offences committed in Wales in November and December 2023 by the driver of a Porsche Cayenne of which Fernández was registered as the owner.

The car was caught by Dyfed-Powys Police running a red light on Church Street, Llanelli on 28 November 2023, and then caught by South Wales Police, a few weeks later, on 20 December, speeding on Carmarthen Road, Swansea. The two police agencies sent officers with court papers to Fernández's home address in Kingston-upon-Thames and to Chelsea's training ground in Stoke D'Abernon, Surrey to identify the driver of the Porsche but Fernández failed to appear for the hearings at Llanelli Magistrates' Court. He was charged £1,000 and £110 in police costs for the offence in Llanelli and a further £1,000 charge, £800 in victim surcharge, and £110 in police costs for the offence in Swansea. Fernández received 12 penalty points (6 for each offence), which on top of 9 existing penalty points for speeding led to a six-month ban from driving.

== Career statistics ==
=== Club ===
As of match played 4 November 2026

Appearances and goals by club, season and competition
Club	Season	League			National cup (Note: Includes Copa Argentina, Taça de Portugal, FA Cup)		League cup (Note: Includes Copa de la Liga Profesional, EFL Cup)		Continental		Other		Total	
Club	Season	Division	Apps	Goals	Apps	Goals	Apps	Goals	Apps	Goals	Apps	Goals	Apps	Goals
River Plate	2019–20	Argentine Primera División	0	0	0	0	—		1 (Note: Appearance(s) in Copa Libertadores)	0	—		1	0
River Plate	2021	Argentine Primera División	20	2	0	0	—		3	0	1 (Note: Appearance in Trofeo de Campeones)	0	24	2
River Plate	2022	Argentine Primera División	20	8	0	0	—		6	2	0	0	26	10
River Plate	Total		40	10	0	0	—		10	2	1	0	51	12
Defensa y Justicia (loan)	2019–20	Argentine Primera División	4	0	2	0	1	0	10 (Note: Four appearances in Copa Libertadores, six appearances and one goal in Copa Sudamericana)	1	—		17	1
Defensa y Justicia (loan)	2021	Argentine Primera División	10	0	0	0	—		4	0	2 (Note: Appearances in Recopa Sudamericana)	0	16	0
Defensa y Justicia (loan)	Total		14	0	2	0	1	0	14	1	2	0	33	1
Benfica	2022–23	Primeira Liga	17	1	3	1	0	0	9 (Note: Appearances in UEFA Champions League)	2	—		29	4
Chelsea	2022–23	Premier League	18	0	—		—		4	0	—		22	0
Chelsea	2023–24	Premier League	28	3	5	2	7	2	—		—		40	7
Chelsea	2024–25	Premier League	36	6	1	0	1	0	8 (Note: Appearances in UEFA Conference League)	2	7 (Note: Appearances in FIFA Club World Cup)	1	53	9
Chelsea	2025–26	Premier League	36	10	4	2	4	0	10	3	—		54	15
Chelsea	2026–27	Premier League	1	0	—		0	0	—		—		1	0
Chelsea	Total		119	19	10	4	12	2	22	5	7	1	170	31
Manchester City	2026–27	Premier League	7	1	0	0	1	0	4	1	—		12	2
Career total			197	31	15	5	14	2	59	11	10	1	295	50

=== International ===
As of match played 6 October 2026

Appearances and goals by national team and year
National team	Year	Apps	Goals
Argentina	2022	10	1
Argentina	2023	9	2
Argentina	2024	15	1
Argentina	2025	4	1
Argentina	2026	13	3
Total		51	8

As of match played 15 July 2026
Scores and results list Argentina's goal tally first, score column indicates score after each Fernández goal.

List of international goals scored by Enzo Fernández
No.	Date	Venue	Cap	Opponent	Score	Result	Competition
1	26 November 2022	Lusail Iconic Stadium, Lusail, Qatar	5	Mexico	2–0	2–0	2022 FIFA World Cup
2	28 March 2023	Estadio Único Madre de Ciudades, Santiago del Estero, Argentina	12	Curaçao	4–0	7–0	Friendly
3	12 September 2023	Estadio Hernando Siles, La Paz, Bolivia	15	Bolivia	1–0	3–0	2026 FIFA World Cup qualification
4	22 March 2024	Lincoln Financial Field, Philadelphia, United States	20	El Salvador	2–0	3–0	Friendly
5	25 March 2025	Estadio Monumental, Buenos Aires, Argentina	36	Brazil	2–0	4–1	2026 FIFA World Cup qualification
6	27 March 2026	La Bombonera, Buenos Aires, Argentina	39	Mauritania	1–0	2–1	Friendly
7	7 July 2026	Mercedes-Benz Stadium, Atlanta, United States	46	Egypt	3–2	3–2	2026 FIFA World Cup
8	15 July 2026	Mercedes-Benz Stadium, Atlanta, United States	48	England	1–1	2–1	2026 FIFA World Cup

== Honours ==
Defensa y Justicia

- Copa Sudamericana: 2020
- Recopa Sudamericana: 2021

River Plate

- Argentine Primera División: 2021
- Trofeo de Campeones: 2021

Benfica

- Primeira Liga: 2022–23

Chelsea

- UEFA Conference League: 2024–25
- FIFA Club World Cup: 2025
- FA Cup runner-up: 2025–26
- EFL Cup runner-up: 2023–24

Argentina

- FIFA World Cup: 2022; runner-up: 2026
- Copa América: 2024

Individual

- CONMEBOL Copa Sudamericana Squad of the Season: 2020
- FIFA World Cup Young Player Award: 2022
- IFFHS Men's CONMEBOL Team: 2022
- UEFA Conference League Team of the Season: 2024–25
- FIFA Club World Cup Team of the Tournament: 2025
