= 2023–24 Chelsea F.C. season =

English football club season

Chelsea
2023–24 season
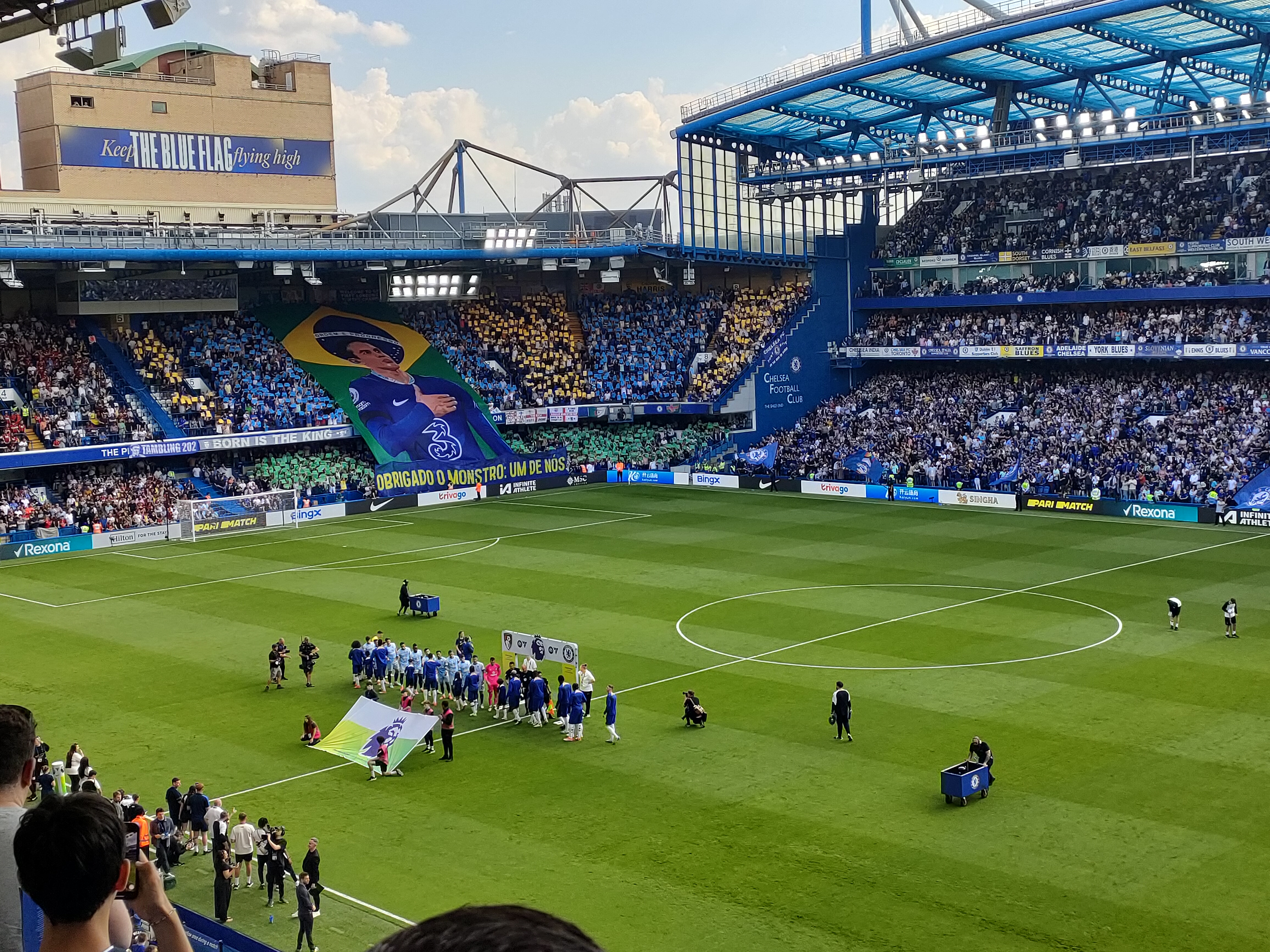
- Chelsea players before their final match of the season, against Bournemouth at Stamford Bridge
- Owner: BlueCo
- Chairman: Todd Boehly
- Head coach: Mauricio Pochettino
- Stadium: Stamford Bridge
- Premier League: 6th
- FA Cup: Semi-finals
- EFL Cup: Runners-up
- Top goalscorer: League: Cole Palmer (22); All: Cole Palmer (25)
- Highest home attendance: 40,096 vs Liverpool, 13 August 2023, Premier League
- Lowest home attendance: 37,516 vs Brighton & Hove Albion, 27 September 2023, EFL Cup
- Average home league attendance: 39,626
- Biggest win: 6–0 vs Everton (H), 15 April 2024, Premier League
- Biggest defeat: 0–5 vs Arsenal (A), 23 April 2024, Premier League
Home colours	Away colours	Third colours

The 2023–24 season was Chelsea Football Club's 118th year in existence and 35th consecutive season in the top flight of English football.

Prior to this season, former Chelsea captain César Azpilicueta left the club at the end of his contract after eleven consecutive seasons, signing for Atlético Madrid in his native Spain. Chelsea academy graduate Reece James replaced him as club captain before the new season opened in July.

Managed by Mauricio Pochettino in his first and only season at the club, Chelsea continued to perform below par during the first half of the campaign, vanishing any title hopes. Nevertheless, the club reached the final of the EFL Cup, finishing as runners-up to Liverpool, as well as the semi-finals of the FA Cup. Chelsea ultimately made a marked improvement during the second half of the season, with only one loss in their final fifteen league matches played from February to May. Subsequently, this led the club to finish in 6th place, securing an immediate return to European football for the next season. Despite the improvement in form in the latter half of the season, head coach Mauricio Pochettino left Chelsea by mutual consent on 21 May 2024 after less than one year and one season in charge.

== Kits ==
Home	Home alt.	Away	Third
Goalkeeper 1	Goalkeeper 2	Goalkeeper 3

== Management team ==
Position	Staff
Head coach	(Argentina) Mauricio Pochettino
Assistant head coach	(Spain) Jesus Perez
First team coach	(Argentina) Miguel D'Agostino
Goalkeeper coaches	(Portugal) Henrique Hilário
Goalkeeper coaches	(Spain) Toni Jiménez
Goalkeeper coaches	(England) Ben Roberts
Assistant goalkeeper coach	(England) James Russell
Coach	(Argentina) Sebastiano Pochettino
Fitness coaches	(England) Matt Birnie
Fitness coaches	(England) Will Tullett

Source: Chelsea F.C.

== Players ==
=== Squad information ===
Players and squad numbers last updated on 19 May 2024. Appearances include all competitions.
Note: Flags indicate national team as has been defined under FIFA eligibility rules. Players may hold more than one non-FIFA nationality.

No.	Player	Nat.	Positions	Date of birth (age)	Signed in	Contract ends	Signed from	Transfer fee	Apps.	Goals
Goalkeepers
1	Robert Sánchez (HG)	(Spain)	GK	18 November 1997 (aged 26)	2023	2030	(England) Brighton & Hove Albion	£25M	21	0
13	Marcus Bettinelli (HG)	(England)	GK	24 May 1992 (aged 32)	2021	2026	(England) Fulham	Free	1	0
28	Đorđe Petrović	(Serbia)	GK	8 October 1999 (aged 24)	2023	2030	(United States) New England Revolution	£12.5M	31	0
Defenders
2	Axel Disasi	(France)	CB	11 March 1998 (aged 26)	2023	2029	(France) Monaco	£38.8M	44	3
3	Marc Cucurella	(Spain)	LB / CB	22 July 1998 (aged 25)	2022	2028	(England) Brighton & Hove Albion	£56M	59	1
5	Benoît Badiashile	(France)	CB	26 March 2001 (aged 23)	2023	2030	(France) Monaco	£35M	33	2
6	Thiago Silva (4th captain)	(Brazil)	CB	22 September 1984 (aged 39)	2020	2024	(France) Paris Saint-Germain	Free	155	9
14	Trevoh Chalobah (HG)	(England)	CB / RB	5 July 1999 (aged 24)	2018	2028	Academy	N/A	80	5
21	Ben Chilwell (vice-captain) (HG)	(England)	LB	21 December 1996 (aged 27)	2020	2027	(England) Leicester City	£45M	106	9
24	Reece James (captain) (HG)	(England)	RB / CB	8 December 1999 (aged 24)	2018	2028	Academy	N/A	158	11
26	Levi Colwill (U21)	(England)	CB / LB	26 February 2003 (aged 21)	2021	2029	Academy	N/A	32	1
27	Malo Gusto (U21)	(France)	RB	19 May 2003 (aged 21)	2023	2030	(France) Lyon	£26.3M	37	0
33	Wesley Fofana	(France)	CB	17 December 2000 (aged 23)	2022	2029	(England) Leicester City	£70M	20	2
42	Alfie Gilchrist (U21)	(England)	CB	28 November 2003 (aged 20)	2023	2026	Academy	N/A	17	1
63	Josh Acheampong (U21)	(England)	RB / CB	5 May 2006 (aged 18)	2024	2026	Academy	N/A	1	0
	Malang Sarr	(France)	CB	23 January 1999 (aged 25)	2020	2025	(France) Nice	Free	21	0
Midfielders
8	Enzo Fernández	(Argentina)	CM / AM / DM	17 January 2001 (aged 23)	2023	2031	(Portugal) Benfica	£106.7M	62	7
16	Lesley Ugochukwu (U21)	(France)	DM	26 March 2004 (aged 20)	2023	2030	(France) Rennes	£23M	15	0
17	Carney Chukwuemeka (U21)	(Austria)	CM / AM	20 October 2003 (aged 20)	2022	2028	(England) Aston Villa	£20M	27	2
23	Conor Gallagher (HG) (3rd captain)	(England)	CM	6 February 2000 (aged 24)	2019	2025	Academy	N/A	95	10
25	Moisés Caicedo	(Ecuador)	DM	2 November 2001 (aged 22)	2023	2031	(England) Brighton & Hove Albion	£100M	48	1
31	Cesare Casadei (U21)	(Italy)	CM	10 January 2003 (aged 21)	2023	2028	Academy	N/A	11	0
45	Roméo Lavia (U21)	(Belgium)	DM	6 January 2004 (aged 20)	2023	2030	(England) Southampton	£53M	1	0
49	Jimi Tauriainen (U21)	(Finland)	CM	8 March 2004 (aged 20)	2024	2026	Academy	N/A	2	0
54	Leo Castledine (U21)	(England)	AM	20 August 2005 (aged 18)	2024	2027	Academy	N/A	1	0
68	Michael Golding (U21)	(England)	AM	23 May 2006 (aged 18)	2024	2025	Academy	N/A	1	0
Forwards
7	Raheem Sterling (HG)	(England)	LW / RW	8 December 1994 (age 31)	2022	2027	(England) Manchester City	£47.5M	81	19
10	Mykhailo Mudryk	(Ukraine)	LW / AM	5 January 2001 (aged 23)	2023	2031	(Ukraine) Shakhtar Donetsk	£62M	58	7
11	Noni Madueke (U21)	(England)	RW / ST	10 March 2002 (aged 22)	2023	2030	(Netherlands) PSV	£30.6M	46	9
15	Nicolas Jackson	(Senegal)	ST	20 June 2001 (aged 23)	2023	2031	(Spain) Villarreal	£32M	44	17
18	Christopher Nkunku	(France)	LW / AM	14 November 1997 (aged 26)	2023	2029	(Germany) RB Leipzig	£52M	14	3
20	Cole Palmer (U21)	(England)	RW / AM	6 May 2002 (aged 22)	2023	2030	(England) Manchester City	£40M	45	25
36	Deivid Washington (U21)	(Brazil)	RW / LW	5 June 2005 (aged 19)	2023	2030	(Brazil) Santos	£13.7M	3	0
43	Diego Moreira (U21)	(Portugal)	LW / RW	21 December 2004 (aged 19)	2023	2028	(Portugal) Benfica	Free	1	0
Out on loan
	Kepa Arrizabalaga	(Spain)	GK	3 October 1994 (aged 29)	2018	2025	(Spain) Athletic Bilbao	£71.6M	163	0
	Eddie Beach (U21)	(Wales)	GK	9 October 2003 (aged 20)	2023	2024	Academy	N/A	0	0
	Lucas Bergström (U21)	(Finland)	GK	5 September 2002 (aged 21)	2022	2025	Academy	N/A	0	0
	Kai Crampton (U21)	(England)	GK	15 January 2007 (aged 17)	2023	2024	Academy	N/A	0	0
	Jamie Cumming (HG)	(England)	GK	4 September 1999 (aged 24)	2020	2024	Academy	N/A	0	0
	Gabriel Slonina (U21)	(United States)	GK	15 May 2004 (aged 20)	2022	2028	(United States) Chicago Fire	£8.1M	0	0
	Bashir Humphreys (U21)	(England)	CB	15 March 2003 (aged 21)	2023	2027	Academy	N/A	2	0
	Ian Maatsen (U21)	(Netherlands)	LB / LW	10 March 2002 (aged 22)	2019	2026	Academy	N/A	16	0
	Tino Anjorin (HG)	(England)	AM	23 November 2001 (aged 22)	2019	2025	Academy	N/A	5	0
	Lewis Hall (U21)	(England)	DM / LB	8 September 2004 (aged 19)	2021	2026	Academy	N/A	12	0
	Omari Hutchinson (U21)	(Jamaica)	AM / RW	30 October 2003 (aged 20)	2022	2025	Academy	N/A	2	0
	Alex Matos (U21)	(England)	AM	3 October 2004 (aged 19)	2023	2026	Academy	N/A	2	0
	Dion Rankine (U21)	(England)	RW / LW	15 October 2002 (aged 21)	2023	2025	Academy	N/A	0	0
	Andrey Santos (U21)	(Brazil)	CM	3 May 2004 (aged 20)	2023	2030	(Brazil) Vasco da Gama	£18M	0	0
	Harvey Vale (U21)	(England)	AM	11 September 2003 (aged 20)	2021	2025	Academy	N/A	5	0
	Charlie Webster (U21)	(England)	CM	31 January 2004 (aged 20)	2023	2024	Academy	N/A	0	0
	Hakim Ziyech	(Morocco)	RW / AM	19 March 1993 (aged 31)	2020	2025	(Netherlands) Ajax	£37M	107	14
	Armando Broja (HG)	(Albania)	ST	10 September 2001 (aged 22)	2020	2028	Academy	N/A	38	3
	Mason Burstow (U21)	(England)	ST	4 August 2003 (aged 20)	2022	2025	(England) Charlton Athletic	£1.8M	3	0
	David Datro Fofana (U21)	(Ivory Coast)	ST	22 December 2002 (aged 21)	2023	2029	(Norway) Molde	£8M	4	0
	Ângelo Gabriel (U21)	(Brazil)	RW / LW	21 December 2004 (aged 19)	2023	2029	(Brazil) Santos	£13M	0	0

Notes:

- Player (HG) – Player who fulfils the Premier League's "Home Grown Player" criteria.
- Player (U21) – Player who is registered by Chelsea as an Under-21 Player on the 2023–24 Premier League Squad List.

== New contracts ==
No.	Pos.	Player	Date	Until	Source
68	MF	(England) Michael Golding	1 July 2023	30 June 2025	
	FW	(Ghana) Ato Ampah	1 July 2023	30 June 2025	
26	DF	(England) Levi Colwill	2 August 2023	30 June 2029	
	DF	(England) Bashir Humphreys	2 September 2023	30 June 2027	
42	DF	(England) Alfie Gilchrist	19 September 2023	30 June 2025	
	MF	(England) Kiano Dyer	1 December 2023	30 June 2025	
52	MF	(England) Leo Castledine	2 December 2023	30 June 2027	
63	DF	(England) Josh Acheampong	3 January 2024	30 June 2026	
	MF	(England) Frankie Runham	10 January 2024	30 June 2026	
	DF	(Netherlands) Ian Maatsen	12 January 2024	30 June 2026	
	GK	(Finland) Lucas Bergström	29 February 2024	30 June 2025	
42	DF	(England) Alfie Gilchrist	2 April 2024	30 June 2026	

== Transfers ==
=== In ===
==== Summer ====
===== First team =====
Date	Pos.	Player	From	Fee	Ref.
1 July 2023	ST	(Senegal) Nicolas Jackson	(Spain) Villarreal	£32,000,000	
1 July 2023	ST	(France) Christopher Nkunku	(Germany) RB Leipzig	£52,000,000	
1 July 2023	LW	(Portugal) Diego Moreira	(Portugal) Benfica	Free	
16 July 2023	RW	(Brazil) Ângelo Gabriel	(Brazil) Santos	£13,000,000	
1 August 2023	DM	(France) Lesley Ugochukwu	(France) Rennes	£23,200,000	
4 August 2023	CB	(France) Axel Disasi	(France) Monaco	£38,800,000	
5 August 2023	GK	(Spain) Robert Sánchez	(England) Brighton & Hove Albion	£25,000,000	
14 August 2023	DM	(Ecuador) Moisés Caicedo	(England) Brighton & Hove Albion	£100,000,000 (Note: Initial £100 million plus reported £15 million bonuses)	
18 August 2023	DM	(Belgium) Roméo Lavia	(England) Southampton	£53,000,000 (Note: Initial £53 million plus reported £5 million bonuses)	
24 August 2023	ST	(Brazil) Deivid Washington	(Brazil) Santos	£13,700,000 (Note: Initial £13.7 million plus reported £3.4 million bonuses)	
26 August 2023	GK	(Serbia) Đorđe Petrović	(United States) New England Revolution	£12,500,000 (Note: Initial £12.5 million plus reported £1.5 million bonuses)	
1 September 2023	AM	(England) Cole Palmer	(England) Manchester City	£40,000,000 (Note: Initial £40 million plus reported £2.5 million bonuses)	

===== Academy =====
Date	Pos.	Player	From	Fee	Ref.
1 July 2023	CM	(England) Alex Matos	(England) Norwich City	Free	
8 July 2023	LB	(England) Ishé Samuels-Smith	(England) Everton	£4,000,000	
21 August 2023	CM	(England) Ollie Harrison	(England) Newcastle United	Undisclosed	

==== Winter ====
===== Academy =====
Date	Pos.	Player	From	Fee	Ref.
12 January 2024 (Note: Completed on 24 June 2023 and became official on 12 January 2024, following Richards' 18th birthday.)	ST	(Jamaica) Dujuan Richards	(Jamaica) Phoenix Academy	Undisclosed	

=== Out ===
==== Summer ====
===== First team =====
Date	Pos.	Player	To	Fee	Ref.
25 June 2023	CB	(Senegal) Kalidou Koulibaly	(Saudi Arabia) Al-Hilal	£17,000,000	
27 June 2023	CM	(Croatia) Mateo Kovačić	(England) Manchester City	£25,000,000 (Note: Initial £25 million plus reported £5 million add-ons)	
28 June 2023	GK	(Senegal) Édouard Mendy	(Saudi Arabia) Al-Ahli	£16,000,000	
28 June 2023	AM	(Germany) Kai Havertz	(England) Arsenal	£65,000,000	
30 June 2023	CM	(England) Ruben Loftus-Cheek	(Italy) Milan	£15,000,000 (Note: Initial £15 million plus reported £3.5 million add-ons)	
1 July 2023	CM	(France) Tiémoué Bakayoko	(France) FC Lorient (Note: Released on 1 July 2023, Bakayoko joined FC Lorient on 31 August 2023.)	Free	
1 July 2023	DM	(France) N'Golo Kanté	(Saudi Arabia) Al-Ittihad	Free	
5 July 2023	AM	(England) Mason Mount	(England) Manchester United	£55,000,000 (Note: Initial £55 million plus reported £5 million add-ons)	
6 July 2023	DF	(Spain) César Azpilicueta	(Spain) Atlético Madrid	Free	
10 July 2023	LB	(Ghana) Baba Rahman	(Greece) PAOK	Free	
13 July 2023	AM	(United States) Christian Pulisic	(Italy) Milan	£17,100,000 (Note: Initial £17.1 million plus reported £1.7 million add-ons)	
19 July 2023	CB	(Wales) Ethan Ampadu	(England) Leeds United	£7,000,000 (Note: Initial £7 million plus reported £3 million add-ons)	
21 July 2023	ST	(Gabon) Pierre-Emerick Aubameyang	(France) Marseille	Free	
1 September 2023	LW	(England) Callum Hudson-Odoi	(England) Nottingham Forest	£5,000,000	

===== Academy =====
Date	Pos.	Player	To	Fee	Ref.
1 July 2023	RB	(England) Derrick Abu	(England) Southampton (Note: Released on 1 July 2023, Abu joined Southampton on 5 July 2023.)	Free	
1 July 2023	GK	(England) Prince Adegoke	(England) Charlton Athletic (Note: Released on 1 July 2023, Adegoke joined Charlton Athletic on 21 August 2023.)	Free	
1 July 2023	GK	(England) Nathan Baxter	(England) Bolton Wanderers	Free	
1 July 2023	LB	(Netherlands) Juan Castillo	(Netherlands) RKC Waalwijk (Note: Released on 1 July 2023, Castillo joined RKC Waalwijk on 4 June 2024.)	Free	
1 July 2023	ST	(Norway) Bryan Fiabema	(Spain) Real Sociedad (Note: Released on 1 July 2023, Fiabema joined Real Sociedad on 11 August 2023)	Free	
1 July 2023	AM	(England) Joe Haigh	(England) Aldershot Town (Note: Released on 1 July 2023, Haigh joined Aldershot on 1 October 2023)	Free	
1 July 2023	RB	(England) Henry Lawrence	(Belgium) Standard Liège (Note: Released on 1 July 2023, Lawrence joined Standard Liège on 7 August 2023)	Free	
1 July 2023	CB	(Northern Ireland) Sam McClelland	(Scotland) St Johnstone (Note: Released on 1 July 2023, McClelland joined St Johnstone on 3 August 2023)	Free	
1 July 2023	RW	(England) Tudor Mendel-Idowu	(Belgium) Anderlecht (Note: Having rejected Chelsea’s contract offer, Mendel-Idowu left the club on 1 July 2023, joining Anderlecht as a free agent on 27 July 2023.)	Free	
1 July 2023	DM	(England) Xavier Simons	(England) Hull City	Free	
1 July 2023	RB	(England) Dujon Sterling	(Scotland) Rangers	Free	
1 July 2023	RW	(England) Silko Thomas	(England) Leicester City (Note: Released on 1 July 2023, Thomas joined Leicester City on 29 August 2023.)	Free	
1 July 2023	GK	(Morocco) Sami Tlemcani	(Greece) AEK Athens (Note: Released on 1 July 2023, Tlemcani joined AEK on 27 July 2023.)	Free	
1 July 2023	GK	(United States) Ethan Wady	(England) Millwall	Free	
1 July 2023	ST	(England) Jayden Wareham	(England) Reading (Note: Released on 1 July 2023, Wareham joined Reading on 1 September 2023.)	Free	
1 July 2023	ST	(England) Malik Mothersille	(England) Peterborough United (Note: Having rejected Chelsea’s contract offer, Mothersille left the club on 1 July 2023, joining Peterborough United as a free agent on 1 September 2023, with the two clubs agreeing a compensation payment.)	Undisclosed	
15 August 2023	CM	(Cameroon) Ben Elliott	(England) Reading	Free	
1 September 2023	ST	(England) Louis Flower	(England) Brighton & Hove Albion	Undisclosed	

=== Loans out ===
==== Summer ====
===== First team =====
Date	Until	Pos.	Player	To	Fee	Ref.
11 July 2023	11 January 2024 (Note: On 11 January 2024, Fofana was recalled from his season-long loan at Union Berlin. He was subsequently loaned to Burnley.)	ST	(Ivory Coast) David Datro Fofana	(Germany) Union Berlin	Free	
8 August 2023	End of season	RW	(Brazil) Ângelo Gabriel	(France) Strasbourg	Free	
10 August 2023	End of season	GK	(United States) Gabriel Slonina	(Belgium) Eupen	Free	
14 August 2023	End of season	GK	(Spain) Kepa Arrizabalaga	(Spain) Real Madrid	£900,000	
15 August 2023	19 January 2024 (Note: On 19 January 2024, Casadei was recalled from his season-long loan at Leicester.)	CM	(Italy) Cesare Casadei	(England) Leicester City	Free	
19 August 2023	End of season	RW	(Morocco) Hakim Ziyech	(Turkey) Galatasaray	£3,000,000 (Note: Includes an obligation to buy for £2.5 million.)	
22 August 2023	End of season	LB	(England) Lewis Hall	(England) Newcastle United	Free (Note: Includes an obligation to buy for £28 million plus £7 million bonuses.)	
25 August 2023	3 January 2024 (Note: On 3 January 2024, Santos was recalled from his season-long loan at Nottingham Forest. He was subsequently loaned to Strasbourg.)	CM	(Brazil) Andrey Santos	(England) Nottingham Forest	Free	
31 August 2023	End of season	CF	(Belgium) Romelu Lukaku	(Italy) Roma	£8,000,000	
1 September 2023	End of season	CF	(England) Mason Burstow	(England) Sunderland	Free	
1 September 2023	22 January 2024 (Note: On 22 January 2024, Moreira was recalled from his season-long loan at Lyon.)	LW	(Portugal) Diego Moreira	(France) Lyon	£2,400,000	
1 September 2023	End of season	CB	(England) Bashir Humphreys	(Wales) Swansea City	Free	

===== Academy =====
Date	Until	Pos.	Player	To	Fee	Ref.
30 June 2023	End of season	CM	(England) Charlie Webster	(Netherlands) Heerenveen	Free	
10 July 2023	22 January 2024 (Note: On 22 January 2024, Sharman-Lowe was recalled from his season-long loan at Bromley.)	GK	(England) Teddy Sharman-Lowe	(England) Bromley	Free	
12 July 2023	End of season	RW	(England) Dion Rankine	(England) Exeter City	Free	
20 July 2023	End of season	AM	(Jamaica) Omari Hutchinson	(England) Ipswich Town	Free	
15 August 2023	End of season	AM	(England) Harvey Vale	(England) Bristol Rovers	Free	
31 August 2023	End of season	AM	(England) Tino Anjorin	(England) Portsmouth	Free	
31 August 2023	2 January 2024 (Note: On 2 January 2024, Sturge was recalled from his season-long loan at Peterborough.)	LB	(England) Zak Sturge	(England) Peterborough United	Free	
2 September 2023	9 January 2024 (Note: On 9 January 2024, Curd was recalled from his loan at Hashtag United.)	GK	(England) Ted Curd	(England) Hashtag United	Free	

==== Winter ====
===== First team =====
Date	Until	Pos.	Player	To	Fee	Ref.
4 January 2024	End of season	AM	(England) Alex Matos	(England) Huddersfield Town	Free	
12 January 2024	End of season	LB / LW	(Netherlands) Ian Maatsen	(Germany) Borussia Dortmund	Free	
13 January 2024	End of season	ST	(Ivory Coast) David Datro Fofana	(England) Burnley	Free	
1 February 2024	End of season	CM	(Brazil) Andrey Santos	(France) Strasbourg	Free	
1 February 2024	End of season	ST	(Albania) Armando Broja	(England) Fulham	Free	
29 February 2024	18 June 2024 (Note: On 18 June 2024, Bergström was recalled from his loan at IF Brommapojkarna.)	GK	(Finland) Lucas Bergström	(Sweden) IF Brommapojkarna	Free	

===== Academy =====
Date	Until	Pos.	Player	To	Fee	Ref.
9 January 2024	End of season	GK	(Wales) Eddie Beach	(England) Gateshead	Free	
11 January 2024	End of season	GK	(England) Jamie Cumming	(England) Oxford United	Free	
17 February 2024	End of season	GK	(England) Kai Crampton	(England) Concord Rangers	Free	

=== Overall transfer activity ===
==== Expenditure ====
Summer: ▼£407,200,000

Winter: £0

Total: ▼£407,200,000

==== Income ====
Summer: ▲£236,400,000

Winter: £0

Total: ▲£236,400,000

==== Net totals ====
Summer: ▼£170,800,000

Winter: £0

Total: ▼£170,800,000

== Pre-season and friendlies ==
Win Draw Loss Fixtures

Chelsea announced a tour of the United States to take part in the Premier League Summer Series pre-season tournament with matches against Brighton & Hove Albion, Newcastle United and Fulham. Prior to the Premier League Summer Series the Blues confirmed a pre-season fixture against Wrexham. It was later announced that Chelsea's last game of their America tour would see them face German opposition Borussia Dortmund on 2 August.

19 July 2023 Friendly	Chelsea	5–0	Wrexham	Chapel Hill, United States
19:00 EDT	Maatsen 3', 42'; Casadei (yellow card) 59'; Gallagher 80'; Nkunku 90'; Chilwell 90+3'	Report		Stadium: Kenan Memorial Stadium; Attendance: 50,596; Referee: Marcos DeOliveira (United States)

22 July 2023 Premier League Summer Series	Chelsea	4–3	Brighton & Hove Albion	Philadelphia, United States
19:00 EDT	Nkunku 19', (yellow card) 52'; Mudryk 65'; Gallagher 72'; Jackson 76'	Report	Welbeck 13'; March (yellow card) 37'; Van Hecke (yellow card) 57' (yellow-red card) 60'; João Pedro 79' (pen.); Undav 89'	Stadium: Lincoln Financial Field; Attendance: 65,128; Referee: Robert Jones

26 July 2023 Premier League Summer Series	Newcastle United	1–1	Chelsea	Atlanta, United States
20:15 EDT	Schär (yellow card) 20'; Almirón 45+4'	Report	Jackson 12'; Gallagher (yellow card) 83'	Stadium: Mercedes-Benz Stadium; Attendance: 70,789; Referee: Peter Bankes

30 July 2023 Premier League Summer Series	Chelsea	2–0	Fulham	Landover, United States
14:45 EDT	Thiago Silva 20'; Nkunku 41'	Report		Stadium: FedEx Field; Referee: Robert Jones

2 August 2023 Friendly	Chelsea	1–1	Borussia Dortmund	Chicago, United States
19:30 CDT	James (yellow card) 45+2'; Burstow 89'	Report	Özcan (yellow card) 61'; Wolf 80'	Stadium: Soldier Field; Attendance: 48,183

== Competitions ==
=== Overall record ===
Competition	First match	Last match	Starting round	Final position	Record							
Competition	First match	Last match	Starting round	Final position	Pld	W	D	L	GF	GA	GD	Win %
Premier League	13 August 2023	19 May 2024	Matchday 1	6th	38	18	9	11	77	63	+14	47.37
FA Cup	6 January 2024	20 April 2024	Third round	Semi-finals	6	4	1	1	14	6	+8	66.67
EFL Cup	30 August 2023	25 February 2024	Second round	Runners-up	7	4	1	2	12	5	+7	57.14
Total					51	26	11	14	103	74	+29	50.98

Source: Soccerway

=== Premier League ===
==== League table ====
Pos	Team	Pld	W	D	L	GF	GA	GD	Pts	Qualification or relegation
4	Aston Villa	38	20	8	10	76	61	+15	68	Qualification for the Champions League league phase
5	Tottenham Hotspur	38	20	6	12	74	61	+13	66	Qualification for the Europa League league phase
6	Chelsea	38	18	9	11	77	63	+14	63	Qualification for the Conference League play-off round (Note: Since the winners of the 2023–24 EFL Cup, Liverpool, qualified for the Champions League, the spot given to the League Cup winners (Conference League play-off round) was passed to the sixth-placed team.)
7	Newcastle United	38	18	6	14	85	62	+23	60	
8	Manchester United	38	18	6	14	57	58	−1	60	Qualification for the Europa League league phase (Note: Manchester United qualified for the Europa League league phase as the 2023–24 FA Cup winners.)

Source: Premier League
Rules for classification: 1) Points; 2) Goal difference; 3) Goals scored; 4) If the champions, relegated teams or qualified teams for UEFA competitions cannot be determined by rules 1 to 3, rules 4.1 to 4.3 are applied – 4.1) Points gained in head-to-head record between such teams; 4.2) Away goals scored in head-to-head record between such teams; 4.3) Play-offs

==== Results summary ====
Overall								Home						Away					
Pld	W	D	L	GF	GA	GD	Pts	W	D	L	GF	GA	GD	W	D	L	GF	GA	GD
38	18	9	11	77	60	+17	63	11	4	4	44	23	+21	7	5	7	33	37	−4

Source: Soccerway

==== Results by round ====
Round	1	2	3	4	5	6	7	8	9	10	11	12	13	14	15	16	17	18	19	20	21	22	23	24	25	27	28	30	31	32	33	29	35	26	36	37	34	38
Ground	H	A	H	H	A	H	A	A	H	H	A	H	A	H	A	A	H	A	H	A	H	A	H	A	A	A	H	H	H	A	H	A	A	H	H	A	A	H
Result	D	L	W	L	D	L	W	W	D	L	W	D	L	W	L	L	W	L	W	W	W	L	L	W	D	D	W	D	W	D	W	L	D	W	W	W	W	W
Position	11	15	10	12	14	14	11	11	10	11	10	10	10	10	10	12	10	10	10	10	9	10	11	10	10	11	11	11	10	9	9	9	9	8	7	7	6	6
Points	1	1	4	4	5	5	8	11	12	12	15	16	16	19	19	19	22	22	25	28	31	31	31	34	35	36	39	40	43	44	47	47	48	51	54	57	60	63

Source: Soccerway
A = Away; H = Home; W = Win; D = Draw; L = Loss; P = Postponed

==== Score overview ====
Win Draw Loss

Opposition	Home score	Away score	Aggregate score	Double
Arsenal	2–2	0–5	2–7	No
Aston Villa	0–1	2–2	2–3	No
Bournemouth	2–1	0–0	2–1	No
Brentford	0–2	2–2	2–4	No
Brighton & Hove Albion	3–2	2–1	5–3	Yes
Burnley	2–2	4–1	6–3	No
Crystal Palace	2–1	3–1	5–2	Yes
Everton	6–0	0–2	6–2	No
Fulham	1–0	2–0	3–0	Yes
Liverpool	1–1	1–4	2–5	No
Luton Town	3–0	3–2	6–2	Yes
Manchester City	4–4	1–1	5–5	No
Manchester United	4–3	1–2	5–5	No
Newcastle United	3–2	1–4	4–6	No
Nottingham Forest	0–1	3–2	3–3	No
Sheffield United	2–0	2–2	4–2	No
Tottenham Hotspur	2–0	4–1	6–1	Yes
West Ham United	5–0	1–3	6–3	No
Wolverhampton Wanderers	2–4	1–2	3–6	No

==== Matches ====
Win Draw Loss Fixtures

The league fixtures were announced on 15 June 2023.

13 August 2023 1	Chelsea	1–1	Liverpool	Fulham
16:30 BST	Chukwuemeka (yellow card) 4'; Fernández (yellow card) 32'; Disasi 37'; Jackson (yellow card) 85'	Report	Díaz 18'; Jota (yellow card) 32'; Alexander-Arnold (yellow card) 68'; Mac Allister (yellow card) 89'	Stadium: Stamford Bridge; Attendance: 40,096; Referee: Anthony Taylor
Note: Live on Sky Sports

20 August 2023 2	West Ham United	3–1	Chelsea	Stratford
16:30 BST	Aguerd 7', (yellow card) 13' (yellow-red card) 67'; Paquetá (yellow card) 35', (goal) 90+5' (pen.); Emerson (yellow card) 45'; Antonio 53'	Report	Chukwuemeka 28', (yellow card) 40'; Disasi (yellow card) 36'; Fernández (penalty missed) 43'; Jackson (yellow card) 72'	Stadium: London Stadium; Attendance: 62,470; Referee: John Brooks
Note: Live on Sky Sports

25 August 2023 3	Chelsea	3–0	Luton Town	Fulham
20:00 BST	Sterling 17', 68'; Fernández (yellow card) 73'; Jackson 75'; Maatsen (yellow card) 90'	Report	Lockyer (yellow card) 27'; Nakamba (yellow card) 30'; Brown (yellow card) 78'	Stadium: Stamford Bridge; Attendance: 39,893; Referee: Robert Jones
Note: Live on Sky Sports

2 September 2023 4	Chelsea	0–1	Nottingham Forest	Fulham
15:00 BST	Chilwell (yellow card) 31'; Jackson (yellow card) 36'; Gallagher (yellow card) 43'	Report	Aina (yellow card) 41'; Elanga 48'; Yates (yellow card) 61'; Tavares (yellow card) 86'; Turner (yellow card) 90+8'	Stadium: Stamford Bridge; Attendance: 39,820; Referee: Tim Robinson

17 September 2023 5	Bournemouth	0–0	Chelsea	Bournemouth
14:00 BST	Kerkez (yellow card) 62'	Report	Sterling (yellow card) 4'; Mudryk (yellow card) 41'; Disasi (yellow card) 76'; Jackson (yellow card) 80'; Chilwell (yellow card) 90+5'	Stadium: Dean Court; Attendance: 10,421; Referee: David Coote
Note: Live on Sky Sports

24 September 2023 6	Chelsea	0–1	Aston Villa	Fulham
14:00 BST	Jackson (yellow card) 50'; Gusto (red card) 58'; Chilwell (yellow card) 90'	Report	Digne (yellow card) 44'; Watkins 73'; Douglas Luiz (yellow card) 90+1'; Martínez (yellow card) 90+4'	Stadium: Stamford Bridge; Attendance: 39,700; Referee: Jarred Gillett

2 October 2023 7	Fulham	0–2	Chelsea	Fulham
20:00 BST	Pereira (yellow card) 57'	Report	Mudryk 18'; Broja 19'; Cucurella (yellow card) 34'; Palmer (yellow card) 55'; Sterling (yellow card) 68'; Sánchez (yellow card) 87'	Stadium: Craven Cottage; Attendance: 24,445; Referee: Tim Robinson

7 October 2023 8	Burnley	1–4	Chelsea	Burnley
15:00 BST	Odobert 15', (yellow card) 38'; Cullen (yellow card) 30'	Report	Cucurella (yellow card) 26'; Fernández (yellow card) 27'; Al-Dakhil 42' (o.g.); Thiago Silva (yellow card) 45+2'; Palmer 50' (pen.); Sterling 65'; Caicedo (yellow card) 74'; Jackson 74'	Stadium: Turf Moor; Attendance: 21,654; Referee: Stuart Attwell

21 October 2023 9	Chelsea	2–2	Arsenal	Fulham
17:30 BST	Palmer (yellow card) 8', (goal) 15' (pen.); Thiago Silva (yellow card) 44'; Mudryk 48'; Cucurella (yellow card) 71'	Report	Zinchenko (yellow card) 11'; Rice 77'; Trossard 84'; Nketiah (yellow card) 89'; White (yellow card) 90+1'	Stadium: Stamford Bridge; Attendance: 39,723; Referee: Chris Kavanagh

28 October 2023 10	Chelsea	0–2	Brentford	Fulham
12:30 BST	Caicedo (yellow card) 78'	Report	Maupay (yellow card) 56'; Pinnock 58'; Onyeka (yellow card) 85'; Ghoddos (yellow card) 90+5'; Mbeumo 90+6'; Nørgaard (yellow card) 90+6'	Stadium: Stamford Bridge; Attendance: 39,575; Referee: Simon Hooper

6 November 2023 11	Tottenham Hotspur	1–4	Chelsea	Tottenham
20:00 GMT	Kulusevski 6'; Udogie (yellow card) 18' (yellow-red card) 55'; Romero (red card) 33'; Sarr (yellow card) 45+10'	Report	Palmer 35' (pen.); Jackson (yellow card) 45+10', (goal) 75', 90+4', 90+7'; Colwill (yellow card) 45+10'; Gusto (yellow card) 86'; Mudryk (yellow card) 89'; Ugochukwu (yellow card) 90+4'	Stadium: Tottenham Hotspur Stadium; Attendance: 61,726; Referee: Michael Oliver

12 November 2023 12	Chelsea	4–4	Manchester City	Fulham
16:30 GMT	Cucurella (yellow card) 22'; Palmer (yellow card) 23', (goal) 90+5' (pen.); Thiago Silva 29'; Sterling 37', (yellow card) 90+7'; Caicedo (yellow card) 60'; Jackson 67', (yellow card) 90+4'	Report	Haaland 25' (pen.), 47'; Akanji 45+1'; Doku (yellow card) 56'; Rodri (yellow card) 72', (goal) 86'; Grealish (yellow card) 90+4'	Stadium: Stamford Bridge; Attendance: 39,532; Referee: Anthony Taylor

25 November 2023 13	Newcastle United	4–1	Chelsea	Newcastle upon Tyne
15:00 GMT	Isak 13'; Trippier (yellow card) 22'; Joelinton (yellow card) 45+3', (goal) 61'; Lascelles (yellow card) 46', (goal) 60'; Gordon 83'; Ritchie (yellow card) 90+2'	Report	Sterling 23', (yellow card) 59'; Ugochukwu (yellow card) 41'; James (yellow card) 55' (yellow-red card) 73'; Cucurella (yellow card) 77'; Colwill (yellow card) 81'	Stadium: St James' Park; Attendance: 52,227; Referee: Simon Hooper

3 December 2023 14	Chelsea	3–2	Brighton & Hove Albion	Fulham
14:00 GMT	Fernández 17', 65' (pen.), (yellow card) 59'; Colwill 21'; Gallagher (yellow card) 31' (yellow-red card) 45'; Badiashile (yellow card) 52'; Sánchez (yellow card) 88'	Report	Buonanotte 43'; Hinshelwood (yellow card) 45+6'; Igor (yellow card) 58'; Groß (yellow card) 64'; Milner (yellow card) 64'; João Pedro 90+2', (yellow card) 90+14'	Stadium: Stamford Bridge; Attendance: 39,647; Referee: Craig Pawson

6 December 2023 15	Manchester United	2–1	Chelsea	Trafford
20:15 GMT	Fernandes (penalty missed) 9'; Shaw (yellow card) 15'; McTominay 19', 69'; Garnacho (yellow card) 22'; Dalot (yellow card) 82'; Reguilón (yellow card) 90+4'	Report	Palmer 45'	Stadium: Old Trafford; Attendance: 73,607; Referee: Chris Kavanagh

10 December 2023 16	Everton	2–0	Chelsea	Walton
14:00 GMT	Gueye (yellow card) 15'; Doucouré 54'; Branthwaite (yellow card) 59'; Dobbin 90+2'	Report	Palmer (yellow card) 20'; Mudryk (yellow card) 73'	Stadium: Goodison Park; Attendance: 39,280; Referee: Michael Oliver

16 December 2023 17	Chelsea	2–0	Sheffield United	Fulham
15:00 GMT	Gallagher (yellow card) 52'; Palmer 54'; Jackson 61'	Report	McAtee (yellow card) 42'; Hamer (yellow card) 63'; Lowe (yellow card) 74'	Stadium: Stamford Bridge; Attendance: 39,559; Referee: Andrew Madley

24 December 2023 18	Wolverhampton Wanderers	2–1	Chelsea	Wolverhampton
13:00 GMT	Lemina (yellow card) 27', (goal) 51'; Cunha (yellow card) 64'; Doherty 90+3'; H. Bueno (yellow card) 90+10'	Report	Gallagher (yellow card) 30'; Palmer (yellow card) 56'; Gusto (yellow card) 60'; Jackson (yellow card) 62'; Nkunku 90+6'; Sterling (yellow card) 90+9'; Bettinelli (yellow card) 90+11'	Stadium: Molineux Stadium; Attendance: 31,641; Referee: David Coote
Note: Live on Sky Sports

27 December 2023 19	Chelsea	2–1	Crystal Palace	Fulham
19:30 GMT	Mudryk 13'; Caicedo (yellow card) 52'; Madueke (yellow card) 80', (goal) 89' (pen.); Gallagher (yellow card) 90+5'	Report	Olise 45+1'; Richards (yellow card) 73'; Mitchell (yellow card) 80'	Stadium: Stamford Bridge; Attendance: 39,618; Referee: Michael Salisbury

30 December 2023 20	Luton Town	2–3	Chelsea	Luton
12:30 GMT	Brown (yellow card) 27'; Mengi (yellow card) 77'; Barkley 80'; Adebayo 87'	Report	Palmer 12', 70'; Madueke 37'; Disasi (yellow card) 87'; Gusto (yellow card) 90+4'	Stadium: Kenilworth Road; Attendance: 11,041; Referee: Paul Tierney

13 January 2024 21	Chelsea	1–0	Fulham	Fulham
12:30 GMT	Gusto (yellow card) 38'; Palmer 45+4' (pen.), (yellow card) 79'; Fernández (yellow card) 58'; Disasi (yellow card) 75'; Thiago Silva (yellow card) 79'	Report	Wilson (yellow card) 49'	Stadium: Stamford Bridge; Attendance: 39,643; Referee: Anthony Taylor

31 January 2024 22	Liverpool	4–1	Chelsea	Liverpool
20:15 GMT	Jota 23'; Bradley 39'; Núñez (penalty missed) 45+2', (yellow card) 47'; Szoboszlai 65'; Konaté (yellow card) 76'; Díaz 79'	Report	Caicedo (yellow card) 11'; Fernández (yellow card) 33'; Chilwell (yellow card) 35'; Disasi (yellow card) 41'; Nkunku 71'	Stadium: Anfield; Attendance: 57,524; Referee: Paul Tierney
Note: The match was originally set for a 20:00 kick-off, but was pushed back fifteen minutes for live TV coverage.

4 February 2024 23	Chelsea	2–4	Wolverhampton Wanderers	Fulham
14:00 GMT	Palmer 19'; Gusto (yellow card) 31'; Caicedo (yellow card) 56'; Chilwell (yellow card) 78'; Thiago Silva 86'	Report	Cunha 22', 63', 82' (pen.); Semedo (yellow card) 39'; Neto (yellow card) 41'; Disasi 43' (o.g.)	Stadium: Stamford Bridge; Attendance: 39,628; Referee: Tim Robinson

12 February 2024 24	Crystal Palace	1–3	Chelsea	Selhurst
20:00 GMT	Lerma 30', (yellow card) 70'; Muñoz (yellow card) 79'	Report	Gallagher 47', 90+1'; Disasi (yellow card) 90+2'; Fernández 90+4'; Jackson (yellow card) 90+5'	Stadium: Selhurst Park; Attendance: 25,110; Referee: Michael Oliver

17 February 2024 25	Manchester City	1–1	Chelsea	Manchester
17:30 GMT	Rodri 83'; Silva (yellow card) 85'	Report	Caicedo (yellow card) 35'; Sterling 42'; Palmer (yellow card) 60'; Petrović (yellow card) 63'	Stadium: City of Manchester Stadium; Attendance: 53,509; Referee: Andrew Madley

2 March 2024 27	Brentford	2–2	Chelsea	Brentford
15:00 GMT	Roerslev 50'; Janelt (yellow card) 57'; Wissa 69'; Onyeka (yellow card) 73'; Jørgensen (yellow card) 90+1'	Report	Jackson 35'; Gallagher (yellow card) 38'; Disasi 83'	Stadium: Gtech Community Stadium; Attendance: 17,140; Referee: Jarred Gillett

11 March 2024 28	Chelsea	3–2	Newcastle United	Fulham
20:00 GMT	Jackson 6'; Sterling (yellow card) 39'; Palmer 58'; Petrović (yellow card) 71'; Caicedo (yellow card) 72'; Mudryk 76'	Report	Isak 43'; Murphy 90'; White (yellow card) 90+6'	Stadium: Stamford Bridge; Attendance: 38,752; Referee: John Brooks
Note: The match was originally scheduled for 9 March, but was moved for live Sky Sports coverage.

30 March 2024 30	Chelsea	2–2	Burnley	Fulham
15:00 GMT	Cucurella (yellow card) 35'; Palmer 44' (pen.), 78'; Gallagher (yellow card) 45+1'	Report	Assignon (yellow card) 16' (yellow-red card) 40'; Cullen (yellow card) 45+3', (goal) 47'; O'Shea 81'; Estève (yellow card) 90+2'	Stadium: Stamford Bridge; Attendance: 39,535; Referee: Darren England

4 April 2024 31	Chelsea	4–3	Manchester United	Fulham
20:15 BST	Gallagher 4'; Palmer 19' (pen.), 90+8' (pen.), 90+10'; Gusto (yellow card) 32'; Fernández (yellow card) 35'; Caicedo (yellow card) 90+12'	Report		Stadium: Stamford Bridge; Attendance: 39,694; Referee: Jarred Gillett
Note: The match was initially scheduled for 3 April, but was moved for live TNT Sports broadcast.

7 April 2024 32	Sheffield United	2–2	Chelsea	Sheffield
17:30 BST	Bogle 32'; Brereton (yellow card) 52'; Robinson (yellow card) 58'; Arblaster (yellow card) 89'; McBurnie 90+3'; Ahmedhodžić (yellow card) 90+8'	Report	Thiago Silva 11'; Chalobah (yellow card) 41'; Madueke 66'; Cucurella (yellow card) 86'	Stadium: Bramall Lane; Attendance: 28,638; Referee: Robert Jones
Note: The match was initially scheduled for 6 April, but was moved due to the Manchester United fixture being moved to Thursday. Kick-off time was then moved from 13:30 to 17:30.

15 April 2024 33	Chelsea	6–0	Everton	Fulham
20:00 BST	Palmer 13', 18', 29', 64' (pen.); Mudryk (yellow card) 40'; Jackson 44'; Gilchrist 90'	Report	Garner (yellow card) 28'; Young (yellow card) 36'; Tarkowski (yellow card) 52'; Keane (yellow card) 66'	Stadium: Stamford Bridge; Attendance: 39,392; Referee: Paul Tierney
Note: The match was initially scheduled for 13 April, but was moved for live Sky Sports broadcast.

23 April 2024 29	Arsenal	5–0	Chelsea	Holloway
20:00 BST	Trossard 4', (yellow card) 45'; White 52', 70', (yellow card) 76'; Havertz 57', 65'	Report	Gilchrist (yellow card) 42'; Cucurella (yellow card) 43'	Stadium: Emirates Stadium; Attendance: 60,238; Referee: Simon Hooper
Note: The match, originally scheduled for 16 March 2024, was postponed due to Chelsea's involvement in the FA Cup.

27 April 2024 35	Aston Villa	2–2	Chelsea	Birmingham
20:00 BST	Cucurella 4' (o.g.); Rogers 42', (yellow card) 64'; Douglas Luiz (yellow card) 49'; Bailey (yellow card) 66'	Report	Caicedo (yellow card) 49'; Madueke 62', (yellow card) 90+10'; Gallagher 81'; Mudryk (yellow card) 82'; Thiago Silva (yellow card) 87'; Badiashile (yellow card) 90+10'	Stadium: Villa Park; Attendance: 42,354; Referee: Craig Pawson
Note: Kick-off time was moved from 15:00 to 20:00 for live TNT Sports coverage.

2 May 2024 26	Chelsea	2–0	Tottenham Hotspur	Fulham
19:30 BST	Chalobah 24'; Jackson 72'	Report	Van de Ven (yellow card) 67'	Stadium: Stamford Bridge; Attendance: 39,086; Referee: Robert Jones
Note: The match was previously postponed due to Chelsea's participation in the EFL Cup final.

5 May 2024 36	Chelsea	5–0	West Ham United	Fulham
14:00 BST	Palmer 15'; Gallagher 30'; Madueke 36'; Cucurella (yellow card) 38'; Jackson 48', 80'	Report	Ogbonna (yellow card) 34'; Emerson (yellow card) 44'; Paquetá (yellow card) 45+2'	Stadium: Stamford Bridge; Attendance: 39,295; Referee: Andrew Madley
Note: The match was initially scheduled for 4 May, but was moved due to matchday 26 being moved to the Thursday prior.

11 May 2024 37	Nottingham Forest	2–3	Chelsea	West Bridgford
17:30 BST	Boly 16'; Hudson-Odoi 74'; Niakhaté (yellow card) 77'; Domínguez (yellow card) 90+2'	Report	Mudryk 8'; Badiashile (yellow card) 15'; Gallagher (yellow card) 34'; Sterling 80'; Jackson 82', (yellow card) 82'	Stadium: City Ground; Attendance: 29,708; Referee: Tony Harrington

15 May 2024 34	Brighton & Hove Albion	1–2	Chelsea	Brighton and Hove
19:45 BST	Dunk (yellow card) 29'; Verbruggen (yellow card) 81'; Welbeck 90+7'	Report	Palmer 34'; Nkunku 64'; Sterling (yellow card) 77'; Caicedo (yellow card) 79'; James (red card) 88'	Stadium: Falmer Stadium; Attendance: 31,555; Referee: Michael Salisbury
Note: The match was postponed due to Chelsea's involvement in the FA Cup.

19 May 2024 38	Chelsea	2–1	Bournemouth	Fulham
16:00 BST	Caicedo 17'; Cucurella (yellow card) 27'; Sterling 48'; Gusto (yellow card) 78'	Report	Semenyo (yellow card) 27'; Kerkez (yellow card) 30'; Badiashile 49' (o.g.); Senesi (yellow card) 80'	Stadium: Stamford Bridge; Attendance: 39,724; Referee: Anthony Taylor

=== FA Cup ===
Win Draw Loss Fixtures

6 January 2024 Third round	Chelsea	4–0	Preston North End	Fulham
17:30 GMT	Broja 58'; Thiago Silva 66'; Sterling 69'; Fernández 85'	Report	Whiteman (yellow card) 68'; Holmes (yellow card) 90+4'	Stadium: Stamford Bridge; Attendance: 39,705; Referee: Thomas Bramall

26 January 2024 Fourth round	Chelsea	0–0	Aston Villa	Fulham
19:45 GMT	Thiago Silva (yellow card) 9'	Report	Tielemans (yellow card) 46'	Stadium: Stamford Bridge; Attendance: 39,325; Referee: Robert Jones

7 February 2024 Fourth round replay	Aston Villa	1–3	Chelsea	Birmingham
20:00 GMT	Diego Carlos (yellow card) 38'; Diaby 90+1'	Report	Gallagher 11'; Jackson 21'; Fernández 54', (yellow card) 55'; Petrović (yellow card) 76'	Stadium: Villa Park; Attendance: 40,013; Referee: Thomas Bramall

28 February 2024 Fifth round	Chelsea	3–2	Leeds United	Fulham
19:30 GMT	Jackson 15'; Mudryk 37'; Chalobah (yellow card) 40'; Fernández (yellow card) 41'; Caicedo (yellow card) 49'; Gallagher 90'	Report	Joseph 8', 59'; Firpo (yellow card) 69'	Stadium: Stamford Bridge; Attendance: 37,892; Referee: David Coote

17 March 2024 Quarter-finals	Chelsea	4–2	Leicester City	Fulham
12:45 GMT	Cucurella 13'; Sterling (penalty missed) 26'; Palmer 45+1'; Chukwuemeka 90+2'; Madueke 90+8'	Report	Disasi 51' (o.g.); Mavididi 62', (yellow card) 67'; Doyle (red card) 73'; Coady (yellow card) 90+6'	Stadium: Stamford Bridge; Attendance: 39,589; Referee: Andrew Madley

20 April 2024 Semi-finals	Manchester City	1–0	Chelsea	Manchester
17:15 BST	Álvarez (yellow card) 58'; Foden (yellow card) 83'; Silva 84'; De Bruyne (yellow card) 86'	Report	Caicedo (yellow card) 45'; Petrović (yellow card) 83'; Fernández (yellow card) 86'	Stadium: Etihad Stadium; Attendance: 54,902; Referee: Michael Oliver

=== EFL Cup ===
Win Draw Loss Fixtures

30 August 2023 Second round	Chelsea	2–1	AFC Wimbledon	Fulham
19:45 BST	Madueke 45+1' (pen.); Fernández 72'; Maatsen (yellow card) 88'	Report	Tilley 19' (pen.); Pearce (yellow card) 47'; Pell (yellow card) 51'	Stadium: Stamford Bridge; Attendance: 37,794; Referee: Tony Harrington

27 September 2023 Third round	Chelsea	1–0	Brighton & Hove Albion	Fulham
19:45 BST	Ugochukwu (yellow card) 45'; Jackson 50'	Report	Baleba (yellow card) 42'; Estupiñán (yellow card) 45'; Welbeck (yellow card) 90+9'	Stadium: Stamford Bridge; Attendance: 37,516; Referee: Thomas Bramall

1 November 2023 Fourth round	Chelsea	2–0	Blackburn Rovers	Fulham
19:45 GMT	Badiashile 30'; Sterling 59'	Report	Pickering (yellow card) 23'; Garrett (yellow card) 81'	Stadium: Stamford Bridge; Attendance: 39,548; Referee: Tim Robinson

19 December 2023 Quarter-finals	Chelsea	1–1 (4–2 p)	Newcastle United	Fulham
20:00 GMT	Caicedo (yellow card) 2'; Sterling (yellow card) 71'; Mudryk 90+2', (yellow card) 90+5'; Gallagher (yellow card) 90+4'	Report	Wilson 16', (yellow card) 87'; Bruno Guimarães (yellow card) 90+5'	Stadium: Stamford Bridge; Attendance: 38,058; Referee: Jarred Gillett
	Penalties
	Palmer (penalty scored); Gallagher (penalty scored); Nkunku (penalty scored); Mudryk (penalty scored)		(penalty scored) Wilson; (penalty missed) Trippier; (penalty scored) Bruno Guimarães; (penalty missed) Ritchie

9 January 2024 Semi-finals First leg	Middlesbrough	1–0	Chelsea	Middlesbrough
20:00 GMT	Hackney 37'; Jones (yellow card) 90+3'	Report	Colwill (yellow card) 30'	Stadium: Riverside Stadium; Attendance: 32,097; Referee: Sam Barrott

23 January 2024 Semi-finals Second leg	Chelsea	6–1 (6–2 agg.)	Middlesbrough	Fulham
20:00 GMT	Mudryk (yellow card) 12'; Howson 15' (o.g.); Fernández 29'; Disasi 36'; Palmer 42', 77'; Thiago Silva (yellow card) 53'; Madueke 81'	Report	Crooks (yellow card) 40'; Van den Berg (yellow card) 64'; Rogers 88'	Stadium: Stamford Bridge; Attendance: 37,754; Referee: John Brooks

25 February 2024 Final	Chelsea	0–1 (a.e.t.)	Liverpool	Wembley
15:00 GMT	Chilwell (yellow card) 45+3'; Palmer (yellow card) 120+2'	Report	Bradley (yellow card) 45+3'; Mac Allister (yellow card) 81'; Konaté (yellow card) 82'; McConnell (yellow card) 107'; Van Dijk 118'; Gomez (yellow card) 120+3'	Stadium: Wembley Stadium; Attendance: 88,868; Referee: Chris Kavanagh

== Statistics ==
=== Appearances ===
No.	Pos.	Player	Premier League	FA Cup	EFL Cup	Total
1	GK	(Spain) Robert Sánchez	16	2	3	21
2	DF	(France) Axel Disasi	31	6	7	44
3	DF	(Spain) Marc Cucurella	19	2	3	24
5	DF	(France) Benoît Badiashile	16	2	2	20
6	DF	(Brazil) Thiago Silva	29	4	3	36
7	FW	(England) Raheem Sterling	29	6	6	41
8	MF	(Argentina) Enzo Fernández	28	5	7	40
10	FW	(Ukraine) Mykhailo Mudryk	30	5	5	40
11	FW	(England) Noni Madueke	21	6	5	32
13	GK	(England) Marcus Bettinelli	0	0	0	0
14	DF	(England) Trevoh Chalobah	11	3	1	15
15	FW	(Senegal) Nicolas Jackson	33	4	5	42
16	MF	(France) Lesley Ugochukwu	10	0	3	13
17	MF	(England) Carney Chukwuemeka	9	2	1	12
18	FW	(France) Christopher Nkunku	9	1	2	12
20	MF	(England) Cole Palmer	31	6	6	43
21	DF	(England) Ben Chilwell	13	5	3	21
23	MF	(England) Conor Gallagher	35	6	7	48
24	DF	(England) Reece James	9	0	1	10
25	MF	(Ecuador) Moisés Caicedo	33	6	7	46
26	DF	(England) Levi Colwill	23	2	7	32
27	DF	(France) Malo Gusto	25	5	5	35
28	GK	(Serbia) Đorđe Petrović	22	4	4	30
31	MF	(Italy) Cesare Casadei	9	0	0	9
33	DF	(France) Wesley Fofana	0	0	0	0
36	FW	(Brazil) Deivid Washington	2	1	0	3
42	DF	(England) Alfie Gilchrist	11	4	2	17
43	FW	(Portugal) Diego Moreira	0	0	1	1
45	MF	(Belgium) Roméo Lavia	1	0	0	1
49	MF	(Finland) Jimi Tauriainen	1	1	0	2
54	MF	(England) Leo Castledine	0	0	1	1
63	DF	(England) Josh Acheampong	1	0	0	1
68	MF	(England) Michael Golding	0	1	0	1
–	DF	(France) Malang Sarr	0	0	0	0
Players who have left the club
19	FW	(Albania) Armando Broja	13	2	4	19
29	DF	(Netherlands) Ian Maatsen	12	0	3	15
37	FW	(England) Mason Burstow	2	0	1	3
48	DF	(England) Bashir Humphreys	0	0	1	1
52	MF	(England) Alex Matos	1	0	1	2

Source: FBref.com

=== Goalscorers ===
Rank	No.	Pos.	Player	Premier League	FA Cup	EFL Cup	Total
1	20	FW	(England) Cole Palmer	22	1	2	25
2	15	FW	(Senegal) Nicolas Jackson	14	2	1	17
3	7	FW	(England) Raheem Sterling	8	1	1	10
4	11	FW	(England) Noni Madueke	5	1	2	8
5	8	MF	(Argentina) Enzo Fernández	3	2	2	7
5	23	MF	(England) Conor Gallagher	5	2	0	7
5	10	FW	(Ukraine) Mykhailo Mudryk	5	1	1	7
8	6	DF	(Brazil) Thiago Silva	3	1	0	4
9	2	FW	(France) Christopher Nkunku	3	0	0	3
9	18	DF	(France) Axel Disasi	2	0	1	3
10	17	MF	(England) Carney Chukwuemeka	1	1	0	2
10	19	FW	(Albania) Armando Broja	1	1	0	2
13	3	DF	(Spain) Marc Cucurella	0	1	0	1
13	5	DF	(France) Benoît Badiashile	0	0	1	1
13	26	DF	(England) Levi Colwill	1	0	0	1
13	42	DF	(England) Alfie Gilchrist	1	0	0	1
13	14	DF	(England) Trevoh Chalobah	1	0	0	1
13	25	MF	(Ecuador) Moisés Caicedo	1	0	0	1
Own goals				1	0	1	2
Totals				77	14	12	103

Source: FBref.com

=== Top assists ===
Rank	No.	Pos.	Player	Premier League	FA Cup	EFL Cup	Total
1	20	MF	(England) Cole Palmer	11	2	2	15
2	23	MF	(England) Conor Gallagher	7	0	2	9
2	27	DF	(France) Malo Gusto	6	3	0	9
4	7	FW	(England) Raheem Sterling	4	3	1	8
5	15	FW	(Senegal) Nicolas Jackson	5	1	0	6
6	8	MF	(Argentina) Enzo Fernández	2	1	0	3
6	11	FW	(England) Noni Madueke	2	1	0	3
6	25	MF	(Ecuador) Moisés Caicedo	3	1	0	4
9	10	FW	(Ukraine) Mykhailo Mudryk	2	0	0	2
10	3	DF	(Spain) Marc Cucurella	2	0	0	2
10	5	DF	(France) Benoît Badiashile	1	0	0	1
10	17	MF	(England) Carney Chukwuemeka	1	0	0	1
10	21	DF	(England) Ben Chilwell	1	0	0	1
10	24	DF	(England) Reece James	2	0	0	2
10	26	DF	(England) Levi Colwill	1	0	0	1
10	6	DF	(Brazil) Thiago Silva	1	0	0	1
Totals				49	12	5	66

Source: FBref.com

=== Clean sheets ===
Rank	No.	Pos.	Player	Premier League	FA Cup	EFL Cup	Total
1	28	GK	(Serbia) Đorđe Petrović	5	2	0	7
2	1	GK	(Spain) Robert Sánchez	3	0	2	5
Totals				8	2	2	12

Source: FBref.com

=== Discipline ===
No.	Pos.	Player	Premier League			FA Cup			EFL Cup			Total		
No.	Pos.	Player	Yellow card	(yellow card) (yellow-red card)	Red card	Yellow card	(yellow card) (yellow-red card)	Red card	Yellow card	(yellow card) (yellow-red card)	Red card	Yellow card	(yellow card) (yellow-red card)	Red card
1	GK	(Spain) Robert Sánchez	2	0	0	0	0	0	0	0	0	2	0	0
2	DF	(France) Axel Disasi	6	0	0	0	0	0	0	0	0	6	0	0
3	DF	(Spain) Marc Cucurella	10	0	0	0	0	0	0	0	0	10	0	0
5	DF	(France) Benoît Badiashile	3	0	0	0	0	0	0	0	0	3	0	0
6	DF	(Brazil) Thiago Silva	4	0	0	1	0	0	1	0	0	6	0	0
7	FW	(England) Raheem Sterling	6	0	0	0	0	0	1	0	0	7	0	0
8	MF	(Argentina) Enzo Fernández	8	0	0	2	0	0	0	0	0	10	0	0
10	FW	(Ukraine) Mykhailo Mudryk	5	0	0	0	0	0	2	0	0	7	0	0
11	FW	(England) Noni Madueke	2	0	0	0	0	0	0	0	0	2	0	0
13	GK	(England) Marcus Bettinelli	1	0	0	0	0	0	0	0	0	1	0	0
14	DF	(England) Trevoh Chalobah	1	0	0	1	0	0	0	0	0	2	0	0
15	FW	(Senegal) Nicolas Jackson	10	0	0	0	0	0	0	0	0	10	0	0
16	MF	(France) Lesley Ugochukwu	2	0	0	0	0	0	1	0	0	3	0	0
17	MF	(England) Carney Chukwuemeka	2	0	0	0	0	0	0	0	0	2	0	0
18	FW	(France) Christopher Nkunku	0	0	0	0	0	0	0	0	0	0	0	0
20	MF	(England) Cole Palmer	7	0	0	0	0	0	1	0	0	8	0	0
21	DF	(England) Ben Chilwell	5	0	0	0	0	0	1	0	0	6	0	0
23	MF	(England) Conor Gallagher	7	1	0	0	0	0	1	0	0	8	1	0
24	DF	(England) Reece James	0	1	1	0	0	0	0	0	0	0	1	1
25	MF	(Ecuador) Moisés Caicedo	10	0	0	2	0	0	1	0	0	13	0	0
26	DF	(England) Levi Colwill	2	0	0	0	0	0	1	0	0	3	0	0
27	DF	(France) Malo Gusto	7	0	1	0	0	0	0	0	0	7	0	1
28	GK	(Serbia) Đorđe Petrović	2	0	0	1	0	0	0	0	0	3	0	0
31	MF	(Italy) Cesare Casadei	0	0	0	0	0	0	0	0	0	0	0	0
33	DF	(France) Wesley Fofana	0	0	0	0	0	0	0	0	0	0	0	0
36	FW	(Brazil) Deivid Washington	0	0	0	0	0	0	0	0	0	0	0	0
42	DF	(England) Alfie Gilchrist	1	0	0	0	0	0	0	0	0	1	0	0
43	FW	(Portugal) Diego Moreira	0	0	0	0	0	0	0	0	0	0	0	0
45	MF	(Belgium) Roméo Lavia	0	0	0	0	0	0	0	0	0	0	0	0
49	MF	(Finland) Jimi Tauriainen	0	0	0	0	0	0	0	0	0	0	0	0
54	MF	(England) Leo Castledine	0	0	0	0	0	0	0	0	0	0	0	0
63	DF	(England) Josh Acheampong	0	0	0	0	0	0	0	0	0	0	0	0
68	MF	(England) Michael Golding	0	0	0	0	0	0	0	0	0	0	0	0
–	DF	(France) Malang Sarr	0	0	0	0	0	0	0	0	0	0	0	0
Players who have left the club
19	FW	(Albania) Armando Broja	0	0	0	0	0	0	0	0	0	0	0	0
29	DF	(Netherlands) Ian Maatsen	1	0	0	0	0	0	1	0	0	2	0	0
37	FW	(England) Mason Burstow	0	0	0	0	0	0	0	0	0	0	0	0
48	DF	(England) Bashir Humphreys	0	0	0	0	0	0	0	0	0	0	0	0
52	MF	(England) Alex Matos	0	0	0	0	0	0	0	0	0	0	0	0
Totals			103	2	1	7	0	0	10	0	0	121	2	1

Source: FBref.com

== Awards ==
=== Players ===
No.	Pos.	Player	Award	Source
1	GK	(Spain) Robert Sánchez	September 2023 Premier League Save of the Month	
20	FW	(England) Cole Palmer	April 2024 Premier League Player of the Month	
20	FW	(England) Cole Palmer	April 2024 Premier League Goal of the Month	
20	FW	(England) Cole Palmer	2023–24 Premier League Young Player of the Season	
20	FW	(England) Cole Palmer	2024 Premier League PFA Fans' Player of the Year	
20	FW	(England) Cole Palmer	2024 Premier League Game Changer of the Season	
