= Levi Colwill =

English footballer (born 2003)

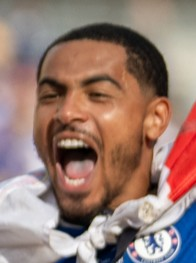
- Colwill with Chelsea in 2025

Personal information
- Full name: Levi Lamar Samuels Colwill
- Date of birth: 26 February 2003 (age 23)
- Place of birth: Southampton, England
- Height: 6 ft 2 in (1.87 m)
- Position: Centre-back

Team information
- Current team: Chelsea
- Number: 6

Youth career
- 2011–2021: Chelsea

Senior career*
Years	Team	Apps	(Gls)
2021–	Chelsea	71	(3)
2021–2022	→ Huddersfield Town (loan)	29	(2)
2022–2023	→ Brighton & Hove Albion (loan)	17	(0)

International career^{‡}
2018–2019	England U16	10	(1)
2019	England U17	5	(0)
2021	England U19	3	(1)
2022–2023	England U21	11	(0)
2023–	England	5	(0)
Medal record
Men's football
Representing England
UEFA European Under-21 Championship
Winner	2023
- * Club domestic league appearances and goals as of 16:53, 21 November 2026 (UTC) ‡ National team caps and goals as of 23:22, 10 June 2025 (UTC)

Levi Lamar Samuels Colwill (born 26 February 2003) is an English professional footballer who plays as a centre-back for Premier League club Chelsea and the England national team.

== Early and personal life ==
Colwill was born on 26 February 2003 in Southampton, Hampshire. His paternal grandfather is Jamaican, and his paternal grandmother is Trinidadian.

Colwill's uncles, Barry and Byron Mason, won the 2014 FA Vase final with Sholing, with Colwill walking out at Wembley Stadium as a mascot. Another uncle, Daniel Mason, also plays for Sholing and works for Southampton. Colwill became an investor in, and associate director of, Sholing in June 2024.

== Club career ==
=== Early career ===
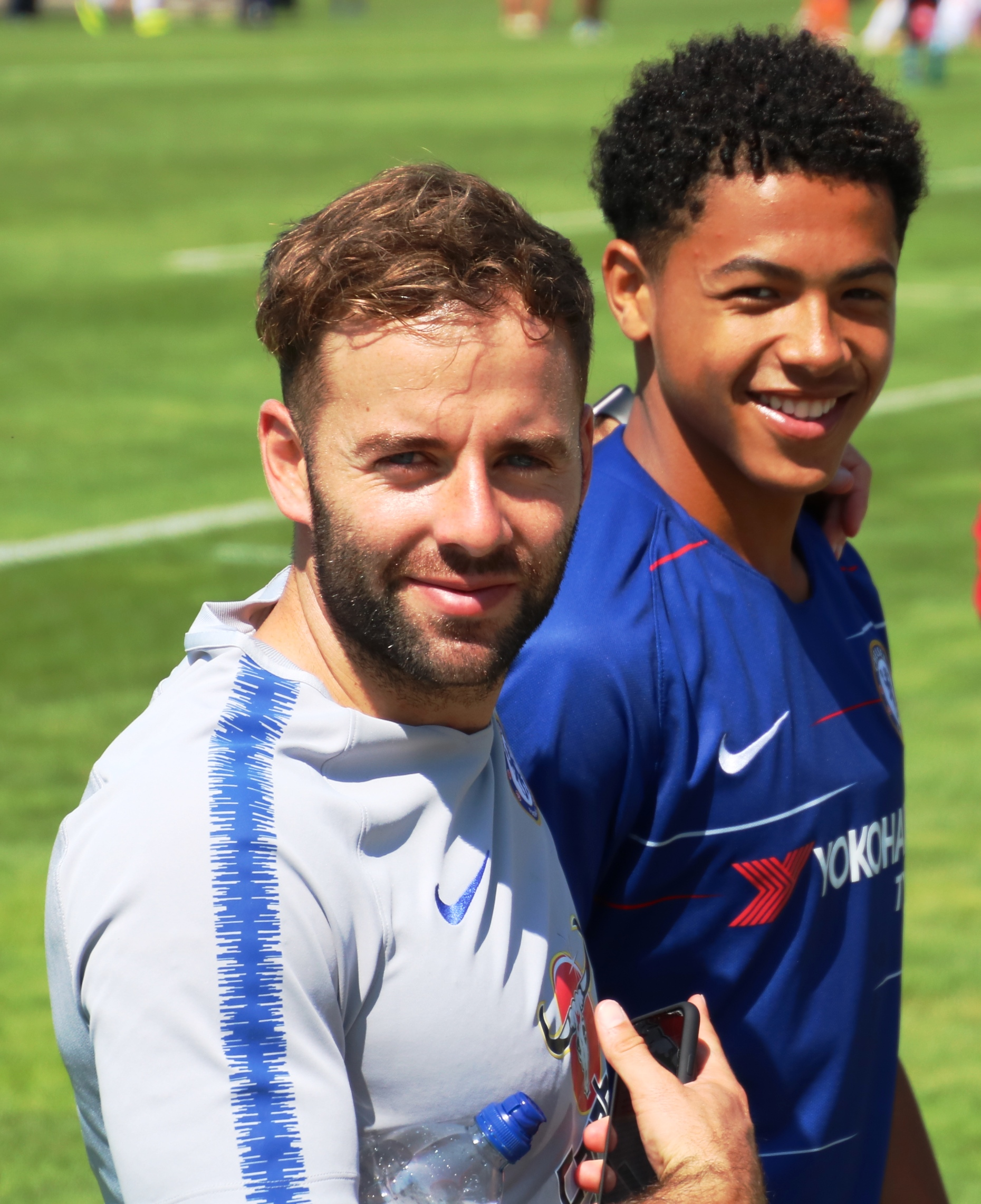
Colwill (right) in the Chelsea Academy in 2018

Colwill joined Chelsea at under-nine level, having previously played for Sunday League team City Central alongside Jamal Musiala. He signed his first professional contract with Chelsea in February 2020 on his 17th birthday.

=== Loans at Huddersfield and Brighton ===
On 25 June 2021, Colwill joined Championship club Huddersfield Town on loan for the 2021–22 season. He made his debut on 1 August in a 4–2 penalty shoot-out win against Sheffield Wednesday in the 2021–22 EFL Cup and his league debut six days later in a 1–1 away draw with Derby County. On 21 August, he scored his first career goal in Huddersfield's 2–1 win at Sheffield United on 21 August. Throughout the season he suffered from ankle, knee and hip problems, as well as COVID-19. On 29 May 2022, Colwill scored an own goal as Huddersfield lost 1–0 to Nottingham Forest at Wembley in the 2022 Championship play-off final.

On 5 August 2022, Colwill joined Premier League club Brighton and Hove Albion on loan for the 2022–23 season. He made his debut two days later against Manchester United, coming on as a stoppage time substitute for Solly March in Brighton's 2–1 win. Colwill made his first Premier League start in a 2–1 home defeat against Aston Villa on 13 November. He ended the season having made 13 starts in the 2022–23 Premier League as Brighton qualified for the UEFA Europa League for the first time in the club's history. On 1 June 2023, it was reported that Chelsea had rejected a £30 million bid from Brighton for Colwill. Colwill complimented Brighton manager Roberto De Zerbi, and said his own game had room to improve.

=== Return to Chelsea ===
On 1 August 2023, Colwill signed a new six-year contract with Chelsea, with an option for a further year. He made his official debut for Chelsea on 13 August, playing the full match as Chelsea drew at home to Liverpool in their opening match of the 2023–24 season. On 3 December, Colwill scored his first goal for Chelsea in a 3–2 victory over Brighton in the 2023–24 Premier League. Three days later, he captained Chelsea for the first time in a 2–1 away loss to Manchester United. During the first half of the season, he featured frequently as a left-back.

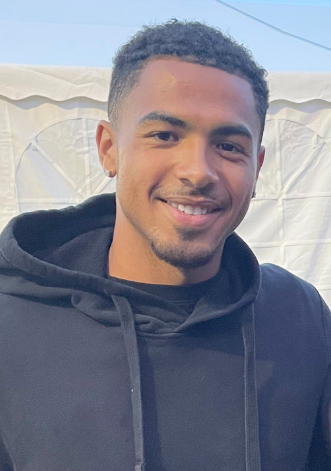
Colwill in 2024.

On 25 May 2025, Colwill scored the decisive goal in a 1–0 away victory over Nottingham Forest on the final matchday of the season, securing Chelsea's fourth-place finish in the league and qualification for the 2025–26 UEFA Champions League. In August 2025, he underwent surgery for an ACL injury sustained during training sessions after the FIFA Club World Cup triumph, an injury which would sideline him for most of the 2025–26 season.

== International career ==
=== Youth career ===
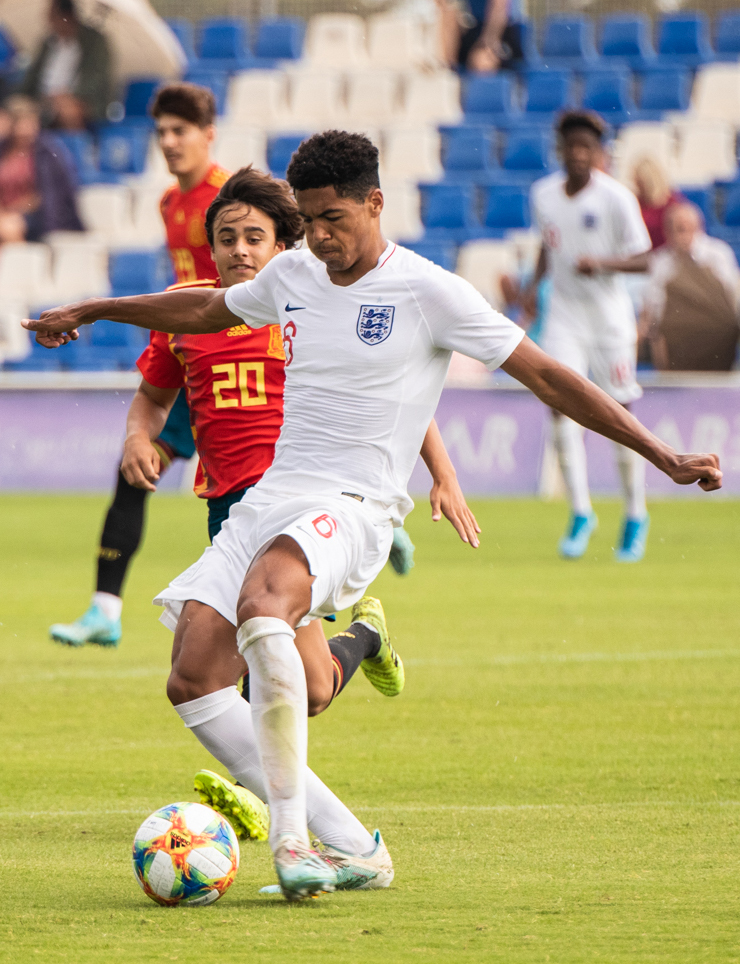
Colwill playing for England England U17 in 2019

With England U17, Colwill won the Syrenka Cup in 2019.

On 10 November 2021, Colwill made his debut for – and captained – the England U19s in a 4–0 victory over Andorra in a 2022 UEFA European Under-19 Championship qualification match. He scored his first goal for the U19s six days later during a 2–0 win against Sweden.

On 27 August 2021, Colwill received his first call up for the England U21s. On 25 March 2022, Colwill made his England U21 debut in a 4–1 win over Andorra at Bournemouth. On 14 June 2023, Colwill was included in the England squad for the 2023 UEFA European Under-21 Championship. Starting five of his country's six games, Colwill helped England to win the tournament without conceding a single goal. Colwill lauded the team's 'family' spirit.

=== Senior career ===
In June 2023, Colwill linked up with the England senior squad for the first time as part of the travelling party to a UEFA Euro 2024 qualifying fixture away to Malta.

On 31 August 2023, Colwill was called up to the senior England squad for the first time, for their fixtures against Ukraine and Scotland. He made his senior debut during a friendly against Australia on 13 October. After being called up again in November 2023, he withdrew from the squad due to injury.

Colwill was not selected for UEFA Euro 2024 but returned to the squad for England's first two matches of the 2024–25 UEFA Nations League, making his first competitive appearance for the senior team against the Republic of Ireland on 7 September 2024.

== Style of play ==
Colwill plays mostly at centre-back, he can also slot in on the left as a full-back or wing-back, and enjoys stepping forward as a ball-playing defender. He has been compared to John Terry due to his shirt number (when he was wearing shirt number 26 in 2023–24 season), status as an academy graduate of Chelsea, and position.

== Career statistics ==
=== Club ===
As of match played 21 November 2026

Appearances and goals by club, season and competition
Club	Season	League			FA Cup		EFL Cup		Europe		Other		Total	
Club	Season	Division	Apps	Goals	Apps	Goals	Apps	Goals	Apps	Goals	Apps	Goals	Apps	Goals
Chelsea U21	2019–20	—			—		—		—		2 (Note: Appearances in EFL Trophy)	0	2	0
Chelsea U21	2020–21	—			—		—		—		3	0	3	0
Chelsea U21	Total	—			—		—		—		5	0	5	0
Chelsea	2021–22	Premier League	0	0	0	0	0	0	—		—		0	0
Chelsea	2022–23	Premier League	0	0	0	0	0	0	—		—		0	0
Chelsea	2023–24	Premier League	23	1	2	0	7	0	—		—		32	1
Chelsea	2024–25	Premier League	35	2	0	0	0	0	3 (Note: Appearances in UEFA Conference League)	0	5 (Note: Appearances in FIFA Club World Cup)	0	43	2
Chelsea	2025–26	Premier League	3	0	1	0	0	0	0	0	—		4	0
Chelsea	2026–27	Premier League	10	0	0	0	2	0	—		—		12	0
Chelsea	Total		71	3	3	0	9	0	3	0	5	0	91	3
Huddersfield Town (loan)	2021–22	Championship	29	2	0	0	1	0	—		2 (Note: Appearances in Championship play-offs)	0	32	2
Brighton & Hove Albion (loan)	2022–23	Premier League	17	0	2	0	3	0	—		—		22	0
Career total			117	5	5	0	13	0	3	0	12	0	150	5

=== International ===
As of match played 10 June 2025

Appearances and goals by national team and year
National team	Year	Apps	Goals
England	2023	1	0
England	2024	3	0
England	2025	1	0
Total		5	0

== Honours ==
Chelsea

- UEFA Conference League: 2024–25
- FIFA Club World Cup: 2025
- FA Cup runner-up: 2025–26
- EFL Cup runner-up: 2023–24

England U21

- UEFA European Under-21 Championship: 2023

Individual

- UEFA European Under-21 Championship Team of the Tournament: 2023
- IFFHS Men's World Youth (U20) Team: 2023
