= Esher Church of England High School =

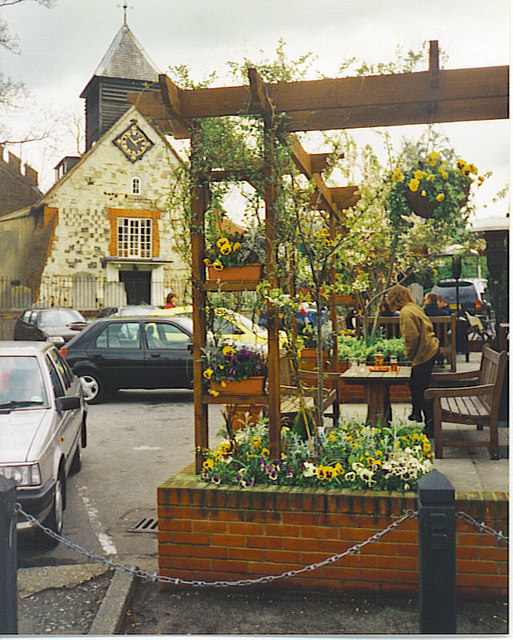

Location
- More Lane; Esher, Surrey, KT10 8AP; England
- Coordinates: 51°22′30″N 0°22′16″W

Information
- Type: Academy
- Religious affiliation: Church of England
- Established: 1958; 68 years ago
- Local authority: Surrey County Council
- Department for Education URN: 140650 Tables
- Ofsted: Reports
- Head of School: Andy King
- Chief Executive Officer: Mike Boddington
- Gender: Coeducational
- Age: 11 to 16
- Enrolment: 1117 (as of 2018/2019)
- Houses: Sirius; Vega; Capella; Mimosa
- Website: www.esherhigh.surrey.sch.uk

Esher Church of England High School is a coeducational Church of England secondary school and academy in Esher, Surrey, England.

== History ==
The school opened as Wayneflete School in 1958. In 1985, through an amalgamation two other local secondary schools: Bishop Fox School in West Molesey and St Andrew's School in Cobham, was renamed Trinity School. To reflect ongoing links with the Diocese of Guildford and provide its location in the title, the school was renamed in 2000.

In 2004 Esher C of E High School was designated specialist status as an Arts College and in 2007 a state of the art Performing Arts Centre was opened by Prince Edward, Earl of Wessex. With significant improvements in exam results year on year, and following and 'outstanding' Ofsted judgement in 2009, the Department for Education awarded High Performing Specialist Status and designated Esher C of E High School a 'Leadership Partner School'.

In 2011 Esher C of E High School was one of 100 'outstanding' schools assessed and designated as a National Teaching School and a National Support School. In 2012 construction began on a new £2.5 million Sports Centre, which was opened by Duke of Kent in February 2013.

In July 2013 a £9 million capital investment programme began at the school with a new Science Block with nine laboratories and lecture theatre, Learning Resources Centre with mezzanine level for the Learning Development Department.

The school converted to academy status on 1 March 2014.

== Specialist needs ==
The school has Speech, Language and Communications Needs ('SCLN') and SEN trained staff to improve education for children who struggle in communication and in an educational setting respectively. SEN children are wherever achievable within the school's financial constraints totally integrated into all aspects of the school community.

Reflecting demand in this category (whether among parents or pupils themselves), in 2012, 14.9% of pupils were supported by school action plus or with a statement of SEN, compared with the national average of 8.1%, an increase of 0.5% on the previous year, and the leading mainstream school in the borough.

== Educational equipment and spaces ==
=== Academic ===
The classrooms and specialist facilities such as the technology and food rooms incorporate technology in teaching spaces to emulate that used in leading employers' workplaces and/or further education. All halls and rooms are purpose-built for the size of the school and their intended use.

=== Music and performance ===
The school has regular concerts. Year groups arrange local and West End theatre trips and it has a dedicated theatre for stage productions.

=== Sports ===
Two from four pathways are chosen in personal fitness and education - Aesthetic (gymnastics, dance, cheer leading etc...), Games (invasion, net and wall, striking and fielding etc...), Fitness (testing, components of fitness and methods of training) and Leadership (organisation, communication and planning skills in sport), making use of:

- Football, rugby and cricket pitches
- Netball pitch
- Tennis court
- Indoor pool (heated), gymnasium and sports hall.

Every pupil in KS4 (years 10 to 11) leaves with a qualification in Physical Education and so choose which qualification in the first few months of year 10.

- Entry Level Certificate - practical option with 6 activities from 3 of the following assessment areas: Games Activities, Gymnastics Activities, Swimming Activities, Athletic Activities, Adventurous Activities, Exercise Activities or Dance
- Sports Leaders Award Level 1 - combines elements of educational practice, technical understanding and practical certification
- Short Course Physical Education - certifies candidates in most advanced educational framework, technical/psychological understanding and practice

=== Teacher training ===
Less than two years after its millennium renaming, the school built on its existing expertise to become a centre for School-Centered Initial Teacher Training (SCITT), which has trained 190 teachers in partnership with three others including George Abbot School, 95% of whom went on to work in Surrey Schools. A greater proportion of accredited teachers under this route than average attain more senior positions and specialist accreditations. Ofsted and most past trainees have rated the SCITT provision as outstanding.

== Assessment ==
The school was judged "Good" by Ofsted in 2017 and again in 2022. The school had been judged "Outstanding" in "Outstanding" in 2009, but was downgraded to "Good" in 2013.

== Results ==
Percentage of students achieving 5+ A*-C GCSEs (or equivalent) including English and maths	2010	2011	2012
School	53%	60%	61%
Local Authority	62%	63.5%	64.2%
England	53.5%	59%	59.4%
