= Samuel Rak-Sakyi =

English footballer (born 2005)

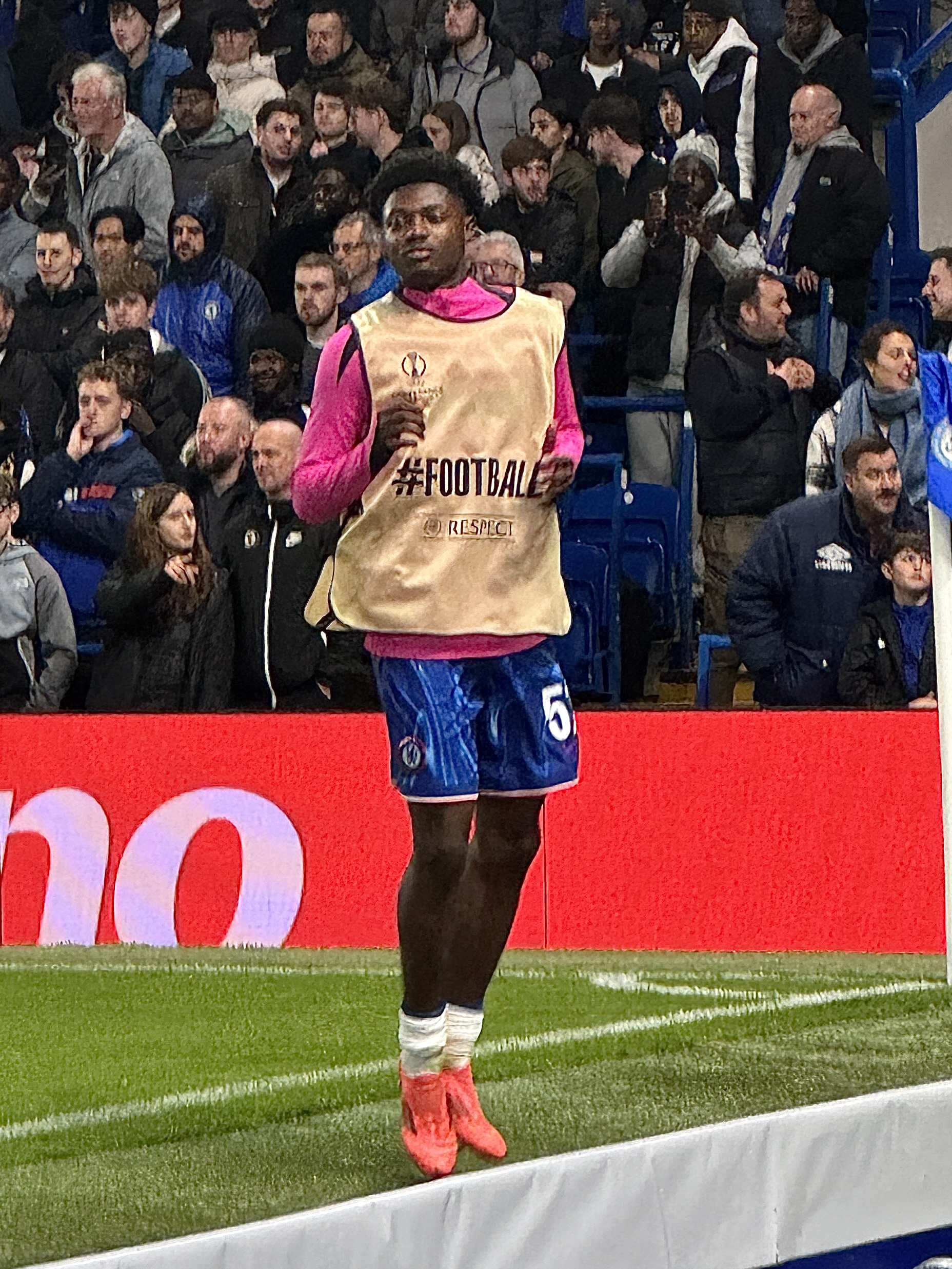
- Rak-Sakyi warming up for Chelsea in 2024

Personal information
- Full name: Samuel Rak-Sakyi
- Date of birth: 27 March 2005 (age 21)
- Place of birth: Southwark, England
- Height: 1.78 m (5 ft 10 in)
- Position: Midfielder

Youth career
- 2013–2024: Chelsea

Senior career*
Years	Team	Apps	(Gls)
2024–2026	Chelsea	0	(0)

International career^{‡}
2021–2022	England U17	9	(0)
2022	England U18	2	(0)
- * Club domestic league appearances and goals ‡ National team caps and goals as of 1 July 2023

Samuel Rak-Sakyi (born 27 March 2005) is an English footballer who plays as a central midfielder.

== Club career ==
Born in London, Rak-Sakyi joined Chelsea at the age of eight. He also had played as a defensive midfielder.

Rak-Sakyi signed his scholar with Chelsea in July 2021. He won the U18 Premier League Cup with Chelsea in 2021–22 season.

During the 2023–24 season, he was key player for Chelsea U23, but suffered a season ending injury in February.

With his youth contract expired in June 2024, Chelsea had prolonged talk to renew his contract. On 21 August 2024, Rak-Sakyi signed a two-year contract with Chelsea. In November 2024, he was included in the senior match squad for the first time in the UEFA Conference League match against Panathinaikos.

On 7 November 2024, Rak-Sakyi made his senior debut for Chelsea in an 8–0 win over FC Noah in the UEFA Conference League, being subbed on in the 79th minute for Christopher Nkunku.

On 12 December 2024, Rak-Sakyi made his full debut for Chelsea starting against Astana in the UEFA Conference League. He departed Chelsea following the conclusion of 2025–26 season.

== International career ==
Rak-Sakyi has represented England at under-17 and under-18 level. He is also eligible to represent Ghana through his parents.

== Personal life ==
Rak-Sakyi's elder brother Jesurun is an international for Ghana and is playing for Crystal Palace.

== Career statistics ==
As of 28 October 2025

Appearances and goals by club, season and competition
Club	Season	League			FA Cup		EFL Cup		Europe		Other		Total	
Club	Season	Division	Apps	Goals	Apps	Goals	Apps	Goals	Apps	Goals	Apps	Goals	Apps	Goals
Chelsea U21	2023–24	—			—		—		—		3 (Note: Appearance(s) in EFL Trophy)	0	3	0
Chelsea U21	2024–25	—			—		—		—		1	0	1	0
Chelsea U21	2025–26	—			—		—		—		2	0	2	0
Chelsea U21	Total		—		—		—		—		6	0	6	0
Chelsea	2024–25	Premier League	0	0	0	0	0	0	4 (Note: Appearance in UEFA Conference League)	0	0	0	4	0
Career total			0	0	0	0	0	0	4	0	6	0	10	0

== Honours ==
Chelsea U18s

- U18 Premier League Cup: 2021–22

Chelsea

- UEFA Conference League: 2024–25
