= 2024–25 Chelsea F.C. season =

English football club season

Chelsea
2024–25 season
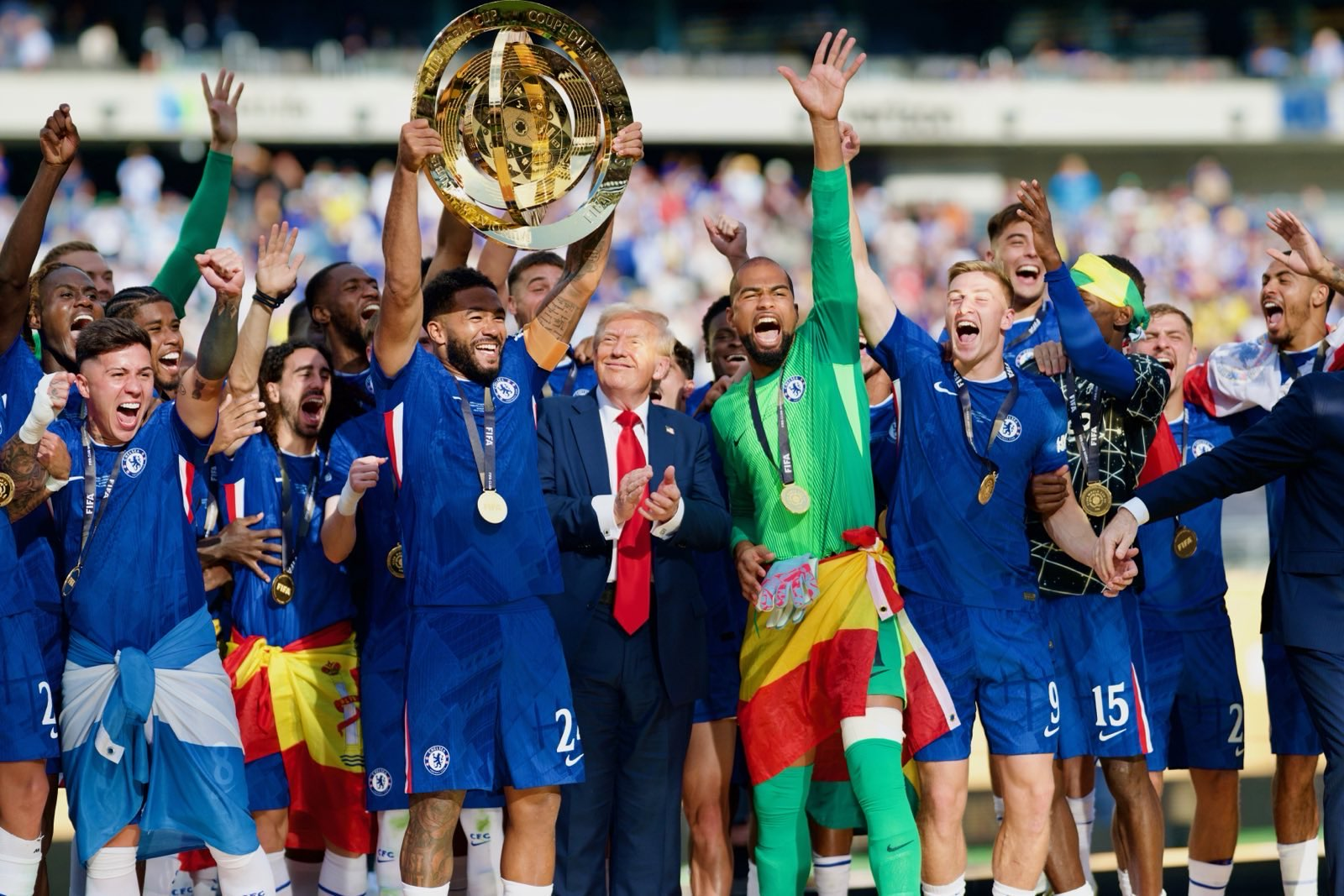
- Chelsea captain Reece James lifting the 2025 FIFA Club World Cup trophy
- Owner: BlueCo
- Chairman: Todd Boehly
- Head coach: Enzo Maresca
- Stadium: Stamford Bridge
- Premier League: 4th
- FA Cup: Fourth round
- EFL Cup: Fourth round
- UEFA Conference League: Winners
- FIFA Club World Cup: Winners
- Top goalscorer: League: Cole Palmer (15); All: Cole Palmer (18)
- Highest home attendance: 40,853 vs Aston Villa, 1 December 2024, Premier League
- Lowest home attendance: 32,464 vs Djurgårdens IF, 8 May 2025, Conference League
- Average home league attendance: 39,681
- Biggest win: 8–0 vs Noah (H), 7 November 2024, Conference League
- Biggest defeat: 0–3 vs Brighton & Hove Albion (A), 14 February 2025, Premier League
Home colours	Away colours	Third colours

The 2024–25 season was the 119th season in the history of Chelsea Football Club, and their 36th consecutive season in the top flight of English football. In addition to the domestic league, the club participated in the FA Cup and the EFL Cup. In international football, Chelsea contested and won both the UEFA Conference League and the expanded FIFA Club World Cup, with this season being their first participation in the former.

== Season summary ==
On 3 June 2024, the club announced that Leicester City manager Enzo Maresca would be joining as head coach on 1 July 2024, signing a five-year deal with an option to extend for a further year.

Despite an opening day defeat to Manchester City, Chelsea would only lose one of their next sixteen games and looked to be unlikely title challengers to runaway leaders Liverpool. On 11 October, Cole Palmer was named the Premier League Player of the Month for September, which largely owed to a spectacular performance where he scored four goals in the first half in a 4-2 victory over Brighton and Hove Albion. Meanwhile, Enzo Maresca picked up the Manager of the Month award. However, a poor run of form beginning with a Boxing Day defeat to local rivals Fulham meant Chelsea's domestic campaign ultimately became a fight to finish in the Top 5 and secure a Champions League place.

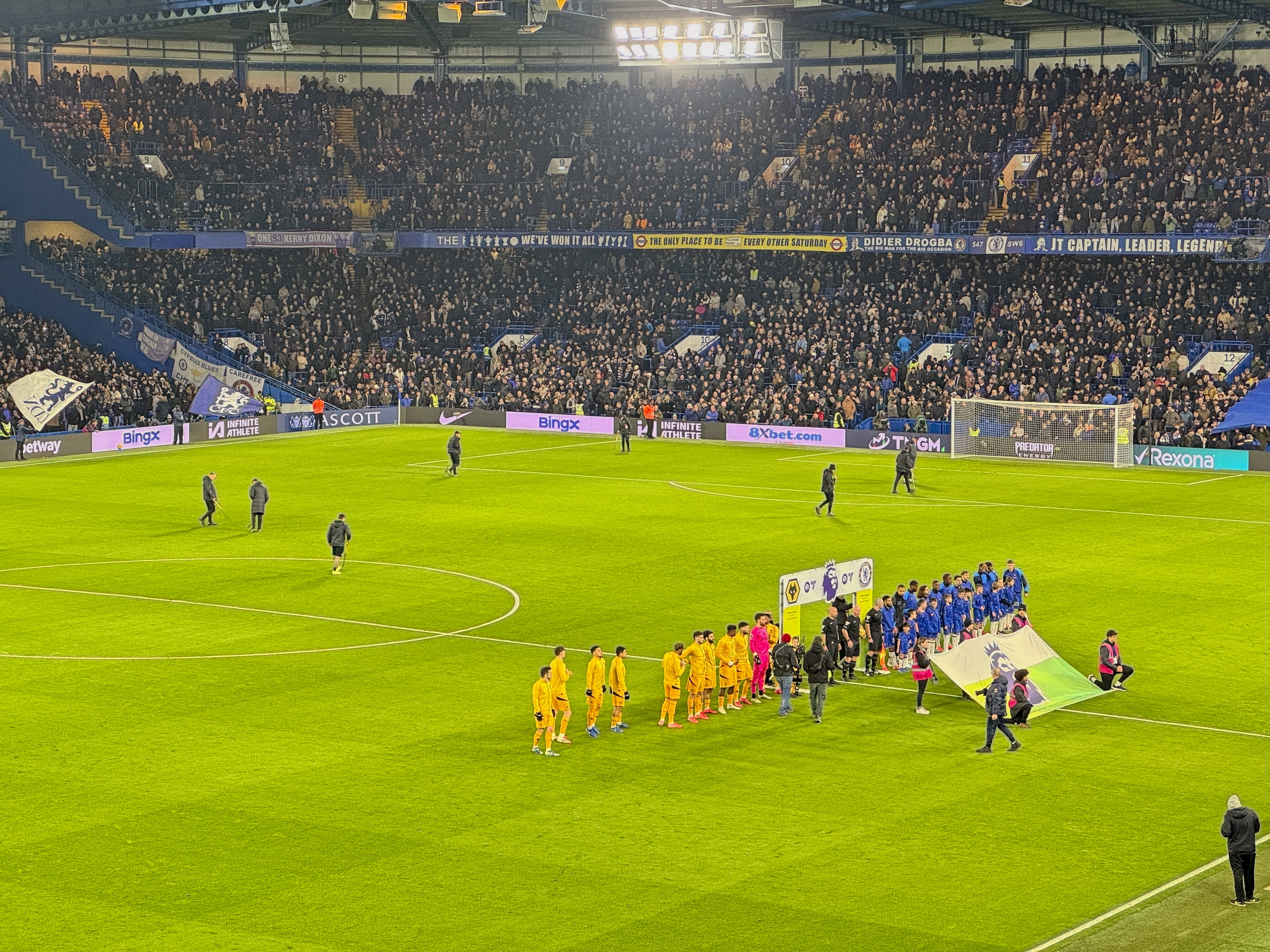
Chelsea players lining up against Wolverhampton Wanderers on 20 January 2025 at Stamford Bridge

On 30 April 2025, having played most of the season without a front of shirt, Chelsea announced a deal with Dubai-based property development firm DAMAC to feature on the kit for the rest of the season in addition to a long-term club partnership.

On 25 May, Chelsea defeated Nottingham Forest on the final match day of the Premier League season to finish fourth in the table, securing a place in the league phase of the 2025–26 UEFA Champions League. This confirmed Chelsea's participation in the UEFA Champions League for the first time since the 2022–23 UEFA Champions League, and the first time that Chelsea had secured a place in European football's elite competition under new owners BlueCo.

On 28 May, Chelsea defeated Real Betis 4–1 in the final of the UEFA Conference League. In doing so, Chelsea became the first club to win each of the five major European competitions. Cole Palmer was named Man of the Match in the final after providing two assists. He was also named in the team of the tournament along with teammates Filip Jörgensen, Tosin Adarabioyo, and Enzo Fernández. The success marked the first silverware won in the BlueCo era.

On 8 July 2025, Chelsea secured a spot in the final of the newly revamped FIFA Club World Cup with a 2–0 win over Brazilian side Fluminense. Both goals were scored by new signing João Pedro, who had only joined Chelsea from Brighton on 2 July and was making just his second appearance for the club. On 13 July, Palmer scored twice and provided an assist for João Pedro in a 3–0 win over Paris Saint-Germain in the final. Palmer earned the Golden Ball award for his performance in the tournament and goalkeeper Robert Sánchez won the Golden Glove.

== Kits ==
Home	Home alt.	Away	Away alt.	Third
Home; 2025–26	Away alt. 1 2025–26	Away alt. 2 2025–26	Away alt. 3 2025–26
Goalkeeper 1	Goalkeeper 2	Goalkeeper 3	Goalkeeper 1 2025–26	Goalkeeper 2 2025–26

== Management team ==
Position	Staff
Head coach	(Italy) Enzo Maresca
Assistant coach	(Argentina) Willy Caballero
First team coach	(Italy) Roberto Vitiello
First team coach	(England) Danny Walker
Goalkeeper coach	(Italy) Michele De Bernardin
Assistant goalkeeper coach	(England) James Russell
Fitness coach	(Spain) Marcos Alvarez
Technical analyst	(Mexico) Bernardo Cueva
Match analyst	(Spain) Javi Molina

Source: Chelsea F.C.

== Squad information ==
Players and squad numbers last updated on 13 July 2025. Appearances include all competitions.

Note: Flags indicate national team as has been defined under FIFA eligibility rules. Players may hold more than one non-FIFA nationality.

=== First team ===
No.	Player	Nat.	Positions	Date of birth (age)	Place of birth	Signed in	Contract ends	Signed from	Transfer fee	Apps.	Goals
Goalkeepers
1	Robert Sánchez (HG, AT)	(Spain)	GK	18 November 1997 (aged 27)	(Spain) Cartagena	2023	2030	(England) Brighton & Hove Albion	£25m	61	0
12	Filip Jörgensen	(Denmark)	GK	16 April 2002 (aged 23)	(Sweden) Lomma	2024	2031	(Spain) Villarreal	£20.7m	24	0
13	Marcus Bettinelli (HG)	(England)	GK	24 May 1992 (aged 33)	(England) Camberwell	2021	2026	(England) Fulham	Free	1	0
39	Mike Penders (Note: Transfer for 2025–26 season, but eligible to play in 2024–25 season for the 2025 FIFA Club World Cup) (U21)	(Belgium)	GK	31 July 2005 (aged 19)	(Belgium) Maasmechelen	2025	2032	(Belgium) Genk	£17m	0	0
44	Gabriel Slonina (U21)	(United States)	GK	12 May 2004 (aged 21)	(United States) Addison	2022	2028	(United States) Chicago Fire	£8.1m	0	0
47	Lucas Bergström (HG)	(Finland)	GK	5 September 2002 (aged 22)	(Finland) Pargas	2022	2025	Academy		0	0
Defenders
3	Marc Cucurella	(Spain)	LB	22 July 1998 (aged 26)	(Spain) Alella	2022	2028	(England) Brighton & Hove Albion	£56m (Note: Initial £56 million plus £7 million in possible add-ons)	113	8
4	Tosin Adarabioyo (HG, AT)	(England)	CB	24 September 1997 (aged 27)	(England) Paddington	2024	2028	(England) Fulham	Free	41	5
5	Benoît Badiashile	(France)	CB	26 March 2001 (aged 24)	(France) Limoges	2023	2030	(France) Monaco	£35m	55	2
6	Levi Colwill (U21, B)	(England)	CB	26 February 2003 (aged 22)	(England) Southampton	2021	2029	Academy		75	3
19	Mamadou Sarr (U21)	(France)	CB	29 August 2005 (aged 19)	(France) Martigues	2025	2033	(France) Strasbourg	£12m	1	0
23	Trevoh Chalobah (HG, CT)	(England)	CB	5 July 1999 (aged 26)	(Sierra Leone) Freetown	2018	2028	Academy		104	5
24	Reece James (captain) (HG, CT)	(England)	RB	8 December 1999 (aged 25)	(England) Redbridge	2018	2028	Academy		190	14
27	Malo Gusto (U21)	(France)	RB	19 May 2003 (aged 22)	(France) Décines-Charpieu	2023	2030	(France) Lyon	£26.3m (Note: Initial £26.3 million plus £4.4 million in possible add-ons)	85	0
29	Wesley Fofana	(France)	CB	17 December 2000 (aged 24)	(France) Marseille	2022	2029	(England) Leicester City	£70m	34	2
30	Aarón Anselmino (U21)	(Argentina)	CB	29 April 2005 (aged 20)	(Argentina) Bernardo Larroudé	2024	2031	(Argentina) Boca Juniors	£15.6m	1	0
34	Josh Acheampong (U21, B)	(England)	RB / CB	5 May 2006 (aged 19)	(England) Waltham Forest	2024	2029	Academy		14	0
59	Harrison Murray-Campbell (U21, B)	(England)	CB	4 August 2006 (aged 18)	(England) Luton	2024	2026	Academy		1	0
64	Genesis Antwi (U21, B)	(Sweden)	RB	11 May 2007 (aged 18)	(Sweden) Stockholm	2025	2027	Academy		2	0
Midfielders
8	Enzo Fernández (vice-captain)	(Argentina)	CM / DM	17 January 2001 (aged 24)	(Argentina) San Martín	2023	2031	(Portugal) Benfica	£106.8m	115	16
10	Cole Palmer (HG, AT)	(England)	AM / RW	6 May 2002 (aged 23)	(England) Manchester	2023	2033	(England) Manchester City	£40m	97	43
14	Dário Essugo (U21)	(Portugal)	DM	14 March 2005 (aged 20)	(Portugal) Odivelas	2025	2033	(Portugal) Sporting CP	£18.5m	3	0
17	Andrey Santos (U21)	(Brazil)	CM	3 May 2004 (aged 21)	(Brazil) Rio de Janeiro	2023	2030	(Brazil) Vasco da Gama	£18m	4	0
22	Kiernan Dewsbury-Hall (HG, AT)	(England)	CM / AM	6 September 1998 (aged 26)	(England) Nottingham	2024	2029	(England) Leicester City	£30m	36	5
25	Moisés Caicedo	(Ecuador)	DM	2 November 2001 (aged 23)	(Ecuador) Santo Domingo	2023	2031	(England) Brighton & Hove Albion	£100m (Note: Initial £100 million plus £15 million in possible add-ons)	98	3
33	Kiano Dyer (U21, B)	(England)	CM	12 November 2006 (aged 18)	(England) Sutton Coldfield	2024	2026	Academy		1	0
37	Omari Kellyman (U21, AT)	(England)	AM	15 September 2005 (aged 19)	(England) Derby	2024	2030	(England) Aston Villa	£19m	0	0
45	Roméo Lavia (U21, AT)	(Belgium)	DM	6 January 2004 (aged 21)	(Belgium) Brussels	2023	2030	(England) Southampton	£53m (Note: Initial £53 million plus £5 million in possible add-ons)	23	0
51	Samuel Rak-Sakyi (U21, B)	(England)	CM	27 March 2005 (aged 20)	(England) Southwark	2024	2026	Academy		4	0
81	Reggie Walsh (U21, B)	(England)	CM	20 October 2008 (aged 16)	(England) London	2025	2026	Academy		2	0
	Mathis Amougou (U21)	(France)	CM	18 January 2006 (aged 19)	(France) Le Blanc-Mesnil	2025	2033	(France) Saint-Étienne	£12.5m	2	0
Forwards
7	Pedro Neto	(Portugal)	RW / LW	9 March 2000 (aged 25)	(Portugal) Viana do Castelo	2024	2031	(England) Wolverhampton Wanderers	£51.3m (Note: Initial £51.3 million plus £2.6 million in possible add-ons)	51	9
9	Liam Delap (U21, AT)	(England)	ST	8 February 2003 (aged 22)	(England) Winchester	2025	2031	(England) Ipswich Town	£30m	6	1
11	Noni Madueke	(England)	RW	10 March 2002 (aged 23)	(England) Barnet	2023	2030	(Netherlands) PSV Eindhoven	£30.7m	92	20
15	Nicolas Jackson	(Senegal)	ST / LW	20 June 2001 (aged 24)	(The Gambia) Banjul	2023	2033	(Spain) Villarreal	£32m	81	30
18	Christopher Nkunku	(France)	CF / AM	14 November 1997 (aged 27)	(France) Lagny-sur-Marne	2023	2029	(Germany) RB Leipzig	£52m	62	18
20	João Pedro	(Brazil)	ST	26 September 2001 (aged 23)	(Brazil) Ribeirão Preto	2025	2033	(England) Brighton & Hove Albion	£55m (Note: Initial £55 million plus £5 million in possible add-ons)	3	3
32	Tyrique George (U21, B)	(England)	LW / RW	4 February 2006 (aged 19)	(England) Camden	2024	2027	Academy		26	3
38	Marc Guiu (U21)	(Spain)	ST	4 January 2006 (aged 19)	(Spain) Granollers	2024	2029	(Spain) Barcelona	£5m	16	6
55	Ato Ampah (U21, B)	(England)	RW / LW	22 April 2006 (aged 19)	(Ghana) Accra	2024	2025	Academy		1	0
76	Shim Mheuka (U21, B)	(England)	ST	20 October 2007 (aged 17)	(England) Birmingham	2024	2027	Academy		5	0
	Mykhailo Mudryk	(Ukraine)	LW	5 January 2001 (aged 24)	(Ukraine) Berestyn	2023	2031	(Ukraine) Shakhtar Donetsk	£62m (Note: Initial £62 million plus £27 million in possible add-ons)	73	10
	David Datro Fofana	(Ivory Coast)	ST	22 December 2002 (aged 22)	(Ivory Coast) Ouragahio	2023	2029	(Norway) Molde	£8m	4	0
	Jadon Sancho (HG, AT)	(England)	LW / RW	25 March 2000 (aged 25)	(England) Camberwell	2024	2025	(England) Manchester United	Loan	41	5

Notes:

- Player (HG) – Player who fulfils the Premier League's "Home Grown Player" criteria.
- Player (U21) – Player who fulfils the Premier League's under-21 player criteria.
- Player (CT) – Player who fulfils UEFA's "club-trained player" criteria.
- Player (AT) – Player who fulfils UEFA's "association-trained player" criteria.
- Player (B) – Player who fulfils UEFA's "List B" criteria.

=== Out on loan ===
Player	Nat.	Positions	Date of birth (age)	Place of birth	Signed in	Contract ends	Signed from	Transfer fee	Apps.	Goals
Goalkeepers
Kepa Arrizabalaga	(Spain)	GK	3 October 1994 (aged 30)	(Spain) Ondarroa	2018	2026	(Spain) Athletic Bilbao	£71.5M	163	0
Max Merrick (U21, B)	(England)	GK	10 November 2005 (aged 19)	(England) High Wycombe	2023	2025	Academy		0	0
Đorđe Petrović	(Serbia)	GK	8 October 1999 (aged 25)	(Serbia) Požarevac	2023	2030	(United States) New England Revolution	£12.5M	31	0
Teddy Sharman-Lowe (U21, AT)	(England)	GK	30 March 2003 (aged 22)	(England) Leicester	2020	2025	(England) Burton Albion	Undisclosed	0	0
Defenders
Ben Chilwell (HG, AT)	(England)	LB	21 December 1996 (aged 28)	(England) Milton Keynes	2020	2027	(England) Leicester City	£45M	107	9
Axel Disasi	(France)	CB	11 March 1998 (aged 27)	(France) Gonesse	2023	2029	(France) Monaco	£38.8M	61	5
Alfie Gilchrist (U21, B)	(England)	CB	28 November 2003 (aged 21)	(England) Kingston upon Thames	2023	2026	Academy		17	1
Bashir Humphreys (U21, B)	(England)	CB	15 March 2003 (aged 22)	(England) Exeter	2023	2027	Academy		2	0
Zak Sturge (U21, AT)	(England)	LB	15 June 2004 (aged 21)	(England) London	2022	2025	Academy		0	0
Renato Veiga (U21)	(Portugal)	LB / DM	29 July 2003 (aged 21)	(Portugal) Lisbon	2024	2031	(Switzerland) Basel	£11.8M	18	2
Caleb Wiley (U21)	(United States)	LB	22 December 2004 (aged 20)	(United States) Atlanta	2024	2030	(United States) Atlanta United	£8.5M	0	0
Dylan Williams (U21, B)	(England)	LB	13 September 2003 (aged 21)	(England) Shrewsbury	2022	2025	(England) Derby County	Undisclosed	0	0
Midfielders
Leo Castledine (U21, B)	(England)	AM	20 August 2005 (aged 19)	(England) Kingston upon Thames	2024	2027	Academy		1	0
Carney Chukwuemeka (U21, B)	(England)	AM / CM	20 October 2003 (aged 21)	(Austria) Eisenstadt	2022	2028	(England) Aston Villa	£20M	32	2
João Félix	(Portugal)	AM / LW	10 November 1999 (aged 25)	(Portugal) Viseu	2024	2031	(Spain) Atlético Madrid	£44.5M	40	11
Alex Matos (U21, AT)	(England)	CM	3 October 2004 (aged 20)	(England) Bedford	2023	2026	Academy		1	0
Lesley Ugochukwu (U21)	(France)	DM	26 March 2004 (aged 21)	(France) Rennes	2023	2030	(France) Rennes	£23M	15	0
Forwards
Armando Broja (HG, CT)	(Albania)	ST	10 September 2001 (aged 23)	(England) Slough	2020	2028	Academy		38	3
Jimmy-Jay Morgan (U21, AT)	(England)	ST	21 January 2006 (aged 19)	(England) Poole	2025	2027	Academy		0	0
Raheem Sterling (HG, AT)	(England)	LW / RW	8 December 1994 (aged 30)	(Jamaica) Kingston	2022	2027	(England) Manchester City	£47.5M	81	19
Deivid Washington (U21)	(Brazil)	ST	5 June 2005 (aged 20)	(Brazil) Itumbiara	2023	2030	(Brazil) Santos	£13.7M	3	0

Notes:

- Player (HG) – Player who fulfils the Premier League's "Home Grown Player" criteria.
- Player (U21) – Player who fulfils the Premier League's under-21 player criteria.
- Player (CT) – Player who fulfils UEFA's "club-trained player" criteria.
- Player (AT) – Player who fulfils UEFA's "association-trained player" criteria.
- Player (B) – Player who fulfils UEFA's "List B" criteria.

== New contracts ==
No.	Pos.	Player	Date	Until	Ref.
58	DF	(England) Richard Olise	21 May 2024	30 June 2025	
75	DF	(England) Kaiden Wilson	22 May 2024	30 June 2026	
	GK	(England) Teddy Sharman-Lowe	24 May 2024	30 June 2025	
32	FW	(England) Tyrique George	17 June 2024	30 June 2027	
82	FW	(England) Frankie Runham	13 July 2024	30 June 2027	
55	FW	(England) Jimmy-Jay Morgan	24 July 2024	30 June 2027	
83	FW	(Republic of Ireland) Shaun Wade	25 July 2024	30 June 2027	
20	FW	(England) Cole Palmer	13 August 2024	30 June 2033	
79	MF	(England) Ollie Harrison	17 August 2024	30 June 2025	
59	MF	(England) Samuel Rak-Sakyi	21 August 2024	30 June 2026	
	GK	(Spain) Kepa Arrizabalaga	29 August 2024	30 June 2026	
15	FW	(Senegal) Nicolas Jackson	13 September 2024	30 June 2033	
34	DF	(England) Josh Acheampong	18 December 2024	30 June 2029	
72	MF	(England) Landon Emenalo	22 January 2025	30 June 2027	
	GK	(England) Ted Curd	23 April 2025	30 June 2028	
42	MF	(Finland) Jimi Tauriainen	23 May 2025	30 June 2027	
	GK	(England) Max Merrick	23 May 2025	30 June 2028	

== Transfers ==
=== In ===
==== Summer ====
Date	Pos.	Player	From	Fee	Ref.
First team
29 June 2024	AM	(England) Omari Kellyman	(England) Aston Villa	£19,000,000	
1 July 2024	CB	(England) Tosin Adarabioyo	(England) Fulham	Free	
1 July 2024	ST	(Spain) Marc Guiu	(Spain) Barcelona	£5,000,000	
2 July 2024	CM	(England) Kiernan Dewsbury-Hall	(England) Leicester City	£30,000,000	
12 July 2024	LB	(Portugal) Renato Veiga	(Switzerland) Basel	£11,800,000	
22 July 2024	LB	(United States) Caleb Wiley	(United States) Atlanta United	£8,500,000	
30 July 2024	GK	(Denmark) Filip Jörgensen	(Spain) Villarreal	£20,700,000	
8 August 2024	CB	(Argentina) Aarón Anselmino	(Argentina) Boca Juniors	£15,600,000	
11 August 2024	RW	(Portugal) Pedro Neto	(England) Wolverhampton Wanderers	£51,300,000 (Note: Initial £51,300,000 plus £2,600,000 in possible add-ons)	
21 August 2024	AM	(Portugal) João Félix	(Spain) Atlético Madrid	£44,500,000	

==== Winter ====
Date	Pos.	Player	From	Fee	Ref.
First team
4 February 2025	CM	(France) Mathis Amougou	(France) Saint-Étienne	£12,500,000	

=== Loaned in ===
==== Summer ====
Date	Pos.	Player	From	Date until	Ref.
First team
30 August 2024	LW	(England) Jadon Sancho	(England) Manchester United	End of season	

=== Out ===
==== Summer ====
Date	Pos.	Player	To	Fee	Ref.
First team
27 June 2024	GK	(England) Jamie Cumming	(England) Oxford United	Undisclosed	
28 June 2024	LB	(Netherlands) Ian Maatsen	(England) Aston Villa	£37,500,000	
28 June 2024	RW	(Morocco) Hakim Ziyech	(Turkey) Galatasaray	£2,500,000	
30 June 2024	RW	(Jamaica) Omari Hutchinson	(England) Ipswich Town	£20,000,000 (Note: Initial £20,000,000 plus £2,500,000 in possible add-ons)	
1 July 2024	LB	(England) Lewis Hall	(England) Newcastle United	£28,000,000	
1 July 2024	CB	(Brazil) Thiago Silva	(Brazil) Fluminense	Free	
26 July 2024	CB	(France) Malang Sarr	(France) Lens	Free	
16 August 2024	LW	(Portugal) Diego Moreira	(France) Strasbourg	£1,700,000	
21 August 2024	CM	(England) Conor Gallagher	(Spain) Atlético Madrid	£36,000,000	
29 August 2024	AM	(England) Tino Anjorin	(Italy) Empoli	Undisclosed	
29 August 2024	ST	(Belgium) Romelu Lukaku	(Italy) Napoli	£25,200,000 (Note: Initial £25,200,000 plus £12,600,000 in possible add-ons)	
3 September 2024	RW	(Brazil) Ângelo Gabriel	(Saudi Arabia) Al Nassr	£19,400,000	
Academy
14 June 2024 (Note: Announced on 13 June 2024, and became official on 14 June as the transfer window reopened)	RW	(England) Dion Rankine	(England) Wigan Athletic	Undisclosed	
21 June 2024	CM	(England) Charlie Webster	(England) Burton Albion	Undisclosed	
1 July 2024	CB	(England) Josh Brooking	(England) Dorking Wanderers (Note: Released on 1 July 2024, Brooking joined Dorking on 6 September 2024.)	Free	
1 July 2024	RB	(England) Noah Hay	(England) Slough Town (Note: Released on 1 July 2024, Hay joined Slough on 1 July 2024.)	Free	
5 July 2024	RW	(England) Chinoso Chibueze	(England) Stoke City	Undisclosed	
7 July 2024	CM	(England) Michael Golding	(England) Leicester City	£5,000,000	
16 August 2024	ST	(England) Mason Burstow	(England) Hull City	£2,000,000	
30 August 2024	CM	(England) Billy Gee	(England) Norwich City	Undisclosed	
30 August 2024	CB	(England) Saheed Olagunju	(England) Wolverhampton Wanderers	Undisclosed	

==== Winter ====
Date	Pos.	Player	To	Fee	Ref.
First team
2 February 2025	CM	(Italy) Cesare Casadei	(Italy) Torino	£12,500,000 (Note: Initial £12,500,000 plus sell-on clause)	
Academy
6 January 2025	GK	(England) Kai Crampton	(England) Bournemouth	Undisclosed	
17 January 2025	LW	(England) Zain Silcott-Duberry	(England) Bournemouth	Undisclosed	
3 February 2025	CB	(England) Travis Akomeah	(England) Watford	Undisclosed	
3 February 2025	LB	(England) Somto Boniface	(England) Ipswich Town	Undisclosed	
3 February 2025	AM	(England) Harvey Vale	(England) Queens Park Rangers	Undisclosed	
4 February 2025	CM	(England) Reiss-Alexander Russell-Denny	(England) Tottenham Hotspur	Undisclosed	

=== Loaned out ===
==== Summer ====
Date	Pos.	Player	To	Date until	Ref.
First team
2 August 2024	CM	(Brazil) Andrey Santos	(France) Strasbourg	End of season	
7 August 2024	RB	(England) Alfie Gilchrist	(England) Sheffield United	End of season	
8 August 2024	CB	(Argentina) Aaron Anselmino	(Argentina) Boca Juniors	3 January 2025 (Note: On 3 January 2025, Anselmino was recalled back from his loan at Boca Juniors.)	
9 August 2024	GK	(Wales) Eddie Beach	(England) Crawley Town	14 January 2025 (Note: On 14 January 2025, Beach was recalled back from his loan at Crawley.)	
11 August 2024	LB	(United States) Caleb Wiley	(France) Strasbourg	3 February 2025 (Note: On 3 February 2025, Wiley was recalled back from his loan at Strasbourg.)	
16 August 2024	CM	(France) Lesley Ugochukwu	(England) Southampton	End of season	
21 August 2024	CB	(England) Bashir Humphreys	(England) Burnley	End of season	
29 August 2024	GK	(Spain) Kepa Arrizabalaga	(England) Bournemouth	End of season	
30 August 2024	ST	(Albania) Armando Broja	(England) Everton	End of season	
30 August 2024	CB	(England) Trevoh Chalobah	(England) Crystal Palace	15 January 2025 (Note: On 15 January 2025, Chalobah was recalled back from his loan at Crystal Palace.)	
30 August 2024	GK	(Serbia) Đorđe Petrović	(France) Strasbourg	End of season	
30 August 2024	LW	(England) Raheem Sterling	(England) Arsenal	End of season	
13 September 2024	ST	(Ivory Coast) David Datro Fofana	(Turkey) Göztepe	3 February 2025 (Note: On 3 February 2025, Fofana was recalled back from his loan at Göztepe.)	
Academy
14 June 2024 (Note: Announced on 13 June 2024, and became official on 14 June as the transfer window reopened)	GK	(England) Teddy Sharman-Lowe	(England) Doncaster Rovers	End of season	
30 June 2024	GK	(England) Ted Curd	(England) Hampton & Richmond Borough	15 January 2025 (Note: On 15 January 2025, Curd was recalled back from his loan at Hampton & Richmond Borough.)	
3 July 2024	LB	(England) Dylan Williams	(England) Burton Albion	End of season	
6 August 2024	GK	(England) Luke Campbell	(England) Hendon	15 January 2025 (Note: On 15 January 2025, Campbell was recalled back from his loan at Hendon.)	
9 August 2024	GK	(United States) Gabriel Slonina	(England) Barnsley	1 January 2025 (Note: On 1 January 2025, Slonina was recalled back from his loan at Barnsley.)	
26 August 2024	AM	(England) Leo Castledine	(England) Shrewsbury Town	End of season	
30 August 2024	ST	(England) Ronnie Stutter	(England) Burton Albion	1 January 2025 (Note: On 1 January 2025, Stutter was recalled back from his loan at Burton.)	

==== Winter ====
Date	Pos.	Player	To	Date until	Ref.
First team
27 January 2025	CB	(Portugal) Renato Veiga	(Italy) Juventus	End of season	
3 February 2025	LB	(England) Ben Chilwell	(England) Crystal Palace	End of season	
3 February 2025	CM	(England) Carney Chukwuemeka	(Germany) Borussia Dortmund	End of season	
3 February 2025	LB	(United States) Caleb Wiley	(England) Watford	End of season	
4 February 2025	CB	(France) Axel Disasi	(England) Aston Villa	End of season	
4 February 2025	AM	(Portugal) João Félix	(Italy) Milan	End of season	
Academy
10 January 2025	CM	(England) Alex Matos	(England) Oxford United	End of season	
17 January 2025	GK	(England) Max Merrick	(England) Hampton & Richmond Borough	End of season	
24 January 2025	ST	(England) Jimmy-Jay Morgan	(England) Gillingham	End of season	
3 February 2025	LB	(England) Zak Sturge	(England) Millwall	End of season	
21 February 2025	ST	(Brazil) Deivid Washington	(Brazil) Santos	31 December 2025	

=== Overall transfer activity ===
==== Expenditure ====
Summer: ▼£206,400,000

Winter: ▼£12,500,000

Total: ▼£218,900,000

==== Income ====
Summer: ▲£177,300,000

Winter: ▲£12,500,000

Total: ▲£189,800,000

==== Net totals ====
Summer: ▼£29,100,000

Winter: £0

Total: ▼£29,100,000

== Pre-season and friendlies ==
On 8 March, Chelsea announced a planned return to the United States during pre-season with matches later confirmed against Wrexham, Club América, Celtic, Manchester City and Real Madrid. A sixth friendly was later announced, against Inter Milan.

Win Draw Loss Fixtures

24 July 2024 Friendly	Chelsea	2–2	Wrexham	Santa Clara, United States
19:00 PDT	Madueke (yellow card) 28'; Nkunku 35'; Ugochukwu 82'	Report	Dobson (yellow card) 23'; Bolton 58'; Marriott 71'	Stadium: Levi's Stadium; Attendance: 32,724; Referee: Tim Ford (United States)

27 July 2024 FC Series friendly	Chelsea	1–4	Celtic	Notre Dame, United States
16:00 CDT	Nkunku 89' (pen.)	Report	O'Riley 19'; Furuhashi 33'; Palma 76'; M. Johnston 79'	Stadium: Notre Dame Stadium

31 July 2024 FC Series friendly	Chelsea	3–0	América	Atlanta, United States
19:00 EDT	Nkunku 3' (pen.); Guiu 21'; Lavia (yellow card) 23'; Ugochukwu (yellow card) 66'; Madueke 79' (pen.); Veiga (yellow card) 90+1'	Report	Aguirre (yellow card) 67'	Stadium: Mercedes-Benz Stadium; Referee: Malik Badawi (United States)

3 August 2024 FC Series	Manchester City	4–2	Chelsea	Columbus, United States
17:30 EDT	Haaland 4' (pen.), 5', 56'; McAtee (yellow card) 41'; Bobb 55'	Report	Caicedo (yellow card) 14'; Gusto (yellow card) 42'; Fernández (yellow card) 45'; Sterling 59'; Madueke 89'	Stadium: Ohio Stadium; Attendance: 71,280; Referee: Ted Unkel (United States)

6 August 2024 Soccer Champions Tour	Real Madrid	2–1	Chelsea	Charlotte, United States
19:00 EDT	Ceballos 19'; Brahim 27'; Lunin (yellow card) 67'	Report	Madueke 39'	Stadium: Bank of America Stadium; Attendance: 62,617; Referee: Guido Gonzales Jr. (United States)

11 August 2024 Friendly	Chelsea	1–1	Inter Milan	Fulham
15:00 BST	Colwill (yellow card) 30'; Cucurella (yellow card) 42'; Ugochukwu 90'	Report	Thuram 26'; Acerbi (yellow card) 30'; Mkhitaryan (yellow card) 59'	Stadium: Stamford Bridge; Attendance: 34,471; Referee: Sam Barrott (England)

== Competitions ==
=== Overall record ===
Competition	First match	Last match	Starting round	Final position	Record							
Competition	First match	Last match	Starting round	Final position	Pld	W	D	L	GF	GA	GD	Win %
Premier League	18 August 2024	25 May 2025	Matchday 1	4th	38	20	9	9	64	43	+21	52.63
FA Cup	11 January 2025	8 February 2025	Third round	Fourth round	2	1	0	1	6	2	+4	50.00
EFL Cup	24 September 2024	30 October 2024	Third round	Fourth round	2	1	0	1	5	2	+3	50.00
UEFA Conference League	22 August 2024	28 May 2025	Play-off round	Winners	15	13	0	2	45	12	+33	86.67
FIFA Club World Cup	16 June 2025	13 July 2025	Group stage	Winners	7	6	0	1	17	5	+12	85.71
Total					64	41	9	14	137	64	+73	64.06

Source: Soccerway

=== Premier League ===
==== League table ====
Pos	Team	Pld	W	D	L	GF	GA	GD	Pts	Qualification or relegation
2	Arsenal	38	20	14	4	69	34	+35	74	Qualification for the Champions League league phase (Note: The Premier League gained an additional Champions League place as a result of England gaining one of the two European Performance Spots (EPS) awarded to the two associations with the highest UEFA coefficient points in 2024–25.)
3	Manchester City	38	21	8	9	72	44	+28	71	Qualification for the Champions League league phase
4	Chelsea	38	20	9	9	64	43	+21	69	Qualification for the Champions League league phase
5	Newcastle United	38	20	6	12	68	47	+21	66	Qualification for the Champions League league phase
6	Aston Villa	38	19	9	10	58	51	+7	66	Qualification for the Europa League league phase (Note: Initially, Crystal Palace qualified for the Europa League league phase as the 2024–25 FA Cup winners. However, due to multi-club ownership rules, they were not permitted to enter the Europa League and entered the Conference League play-off round instead, with 7th-placed Nottingham Forest taking their place in the Europa League. Crystal Palace appealed the decision but this was ultimately rejected.)

Source: Premier League
Rules for classification: 1) Points; 2) Goal difference; 3) Goals scored; 4) If the champions, relegated teams or qualified teams for UEFA competitions cannot be determined by rules 1 to 3, rules 4.1 to 4.3 are applied – 4.1) Points gained in head-to-head record between such teams; 4.2) Away goals scored in head-to-head record between such teams; 4.3) Play-offs

==== Results summary ====
Overall								Home						Away					
Pld	W	D	L	GF	GA	GD	Pts	W	D	L	GF	GA	GD	W	D	L	GF	GA	GD
38	20	9	9	64	43	+21	69	12	5	2	35	18	+17	8	4	7	29	25	+4

Source: Soccerway

==== Results by round ====
Round	1	2	3	4	5	6	7	8	9	10	11	12	13	14	15	16	17	18	19	20	21	22	23	24	25	26	27	28	29	30	31	32	33	34	35	36	37	38
Ground	H	A	H	A	A	H	H	A	H	A	H	A	H	A	A	H	A	H	A	A	H	H	A	H	A	A	H	H	A	H	A	H	A	H	H	A	H	A
Result	L	W	D	W	W	W	D	L	W	D	D	W	W	W	W	W	D	L	L	D	D	W	L	W	L	L	W	W	L	W	D	D	W	W	W	L	W	W
Position	17	8	11	8	5	4	4	6	5	4	3	3	3	2	2	2	2	3	4	4	5	4	6	4	6	7	5	4	4	4	4	6	6	5	5	5	5	4
Points	0	3	4	7	10	13	14	14	17	18	19	22	25	28	31	34	35	35	35	36	37	40	40	43	43	43	46	49	49	52	53	54	57	60	63	63	66	69

Source: Soccerway
A = Away; H = Home; W = Win; D = Draw; L = Loss; P = Postponed

==== Score overview ====
Win Draw Loss

Opposition	Home score	Away score	Aggregate score	Double
Arsenal	1–1	0–1	1–2	No
Aston Villa	3–0	1–2	4–2	No
Bournemouth	2–2	1–0	3–2	No
Brentford	2–1	0–0	2–1	No
Brighton & Hove Albion	4–2	0–3	4–5	No
Crystal Palace	1–1	1–1	2–2	No
Everton	1–0	0–0	1–0	No
Fulham	1–2	2–1	3–3	No
Ipswich Town	2–2	0–2	2–4	No
Leicester City	1–0	2–1	3–1	Yes
Liverpool	3–1	1–2	4–3	No
Manchester City	0–2	1–3	1–5	No
Manchester United	1–0	1–1	2–1	No
Newcastle United	2–1	0–2	2–3	No
Nottingham Forest	1–1	1–0	2–1	No
Southampton	4–0	5–1	9–1	Yes
Tottenham Hotspur	1–0	4–3	5–3	Yes
West Ham United	2–1	3–0	5–1	Yes
Wolverhampton Wanderers	3–1	6–2	9–3	Yes

==== Matches ====
The league fixtures were announced on 18 June 2024.

Win Draw Loss Fixtures

18 August 2024 1	Chelsea	0–2	Manchester City	Fulham
16:30 BST	Caicedo (yellow card) 89'	Report	Haaland 18', (yellow card) 66'; Kovačić 84'	Stadium: Stamford Bridge; Attendance: 39,818; Referee: Anthony Taylor

25 August 2024 2	Wolverhampton Wanderers	2–6	Chelsea	Wolverhampton
14:00 BST	Cunha 27'; Aït-Nouri (yellow card) 35'; Larsen 45+6'; Mosquera (yellow card) 71'	Report	Jackson 2'; Gusto (yellow card) 40'; Palmer (yellow card) 44', (goal) 45'; Madueke 49', 58', 63'; Cucurella (yellow card) 71'; Félix 80'	Stadium: Molineux Stadium; Attendance: 31,325; Referee: Darren England
Note: Fixture was initially scheduled for 24 August, but was moved due to Chelsea's UEFA Conference League involvement on the Thursday prior.

1 September 2024 3	Chelsea	1–1	Crystal Palace	Fulham
13:30 BST	Neto (yellow card) 8'; Jackson 25', (yellow card) 63'; Fofana (yellow card) 32'; Palmer (yellow card) 90+1'	Report	Hughes (yellow card) 13'; Eze 53'; Muñoz (yellow card) 89'	Stadium: Stamford Bridge; Attendance: 39,298; Referee: Jarred Gillett
Note: Fixture was initially scheduled for 31 August, but was moved due to Chelsea's UEFA Conference League involvement on the Thursday prior.

14 September 2024 4	Bournemouth	0–1	Chelsea	Bournemouth
20:00 BST	Christie (yellow card) 18'; Cook (yellow card) 35'; Smith (yellow card) 38'; Evanilson (penalty missed) 38'; Kluivert (yellow card) 59'; Senesi (yellow card) 80'; Semenyo (yellow card) 90+6'	Report	Fofana (yellow card) 31'; Cucurella (yellow card) 36'; Sánchez (yellow card) 37'; Jackson (yellow card) 52'; Colwill (yellow card) 57'; Sancho (yellow card) 57'; Nkunku 86'; Veiga (yellow card) 87'; Félix (yellow card) 90+1'	Stadium: Dean Court; Attendance: 11,235; Referee: Anthony Taylor
Note: Fixture was initially scheduled for a 15:00 kick-off, but was moved for live Sky Sports broadcast.

21 September 2024 5	West Ham United	0–3	Chelsea	Stratford
12:30 BST	Souček (yellow card) 47'; Álvarez (yellow card) 49'; Kilman (yellow card) 77'; Antonio (yellow card) 83'; Soler (yellow card) 90+3'	Report	Jackson 4', 18'; Fofana (yellow card) 45'; Palmer 47'; Cucurella (yellow card) 71'	Stadium: London Stadium; Attendance: 62,473; Referee: Sam Barrott
Note: Fixture was initially scheduled for a 15:00 kick-off, but was moved for live TNT Sports broadcast.

28 September 2024 6	Chelsea	4–2	Brighton & Hove Albion	Fulham
15:00 BST	Palmer 21', 28' (pen.), 31', 41'; Fernández (yellow card) 29'; Cucurella (yellow card) 33'; Fofana (yellow card) 78'	Report	Rutter 7'; Dunk (yellow card) 27'; Estupiñán (yellow card) 29'; Baleba 34'	Stadium: Stamford Bridge; Attendance: 39,495; Referee: Peter Bankes

6 October 2024 7	Chelsea	1–1	Nottingham Forest	Fulham
14:00 BST	Caicedo (yellow card) 21'; Madueke 57'; Palmer (yellow card) 75'; Cucurella (yellow card) 89'; Colwill (yellow card) 89'; Neto (yellow card) 90+8'; Fofana (yellow card) 90+12'	Report	Ward-Prowse (yellow card) 36' (yellow-red card) 78'; Wood 49'; Williams (yellow card) 89'; Sels (yellow card) 90+5'	Stadium: Stamford Bridge; Attendance: 39,501; Referee: Chris Kavanagh
Note: Fixture was initially scheduled for 5 October, but was moved due to Chelsea's UEFA Conference League involvement on the Thursday prior.

20 October 2024 8	Liverpool	2–1	Chelsea	Liverpool
16:30 BST	Salah 29' (pen.); Szoboszlai (yellow card) 45+8'; Jones 51'; Núñez (yellow card) 69'; Konaté (yellow card) 80'; Mac Allister (yellow card) 90+2'	Report	Adarabioyo (yellow card) 6'; Jackson (yellow card) 28', (goal) 48'; Veiga (yellow card) 78'	Stadium: Anfield; Attendance: 60,277; Referee: John Brooks
Note: Fixture was initially scheduled for 19 October, but was moved for live Sky Sports broadcast.

27 October 2024 9	Chelsea	2–1	Newcastle United	Fulham
14:00 BST	Fofana (yellow card) 11'; Jackson 18'; Palmer 47'; Lavia (yellow card) 54'; Madueke (yellow card) 66'; Sánchez (yellow card) 84'; Neto (yellow card) 88'; Nkunku (yellow card) 90+4'	Report	Schär (yellow card) 22'; Isak 32'; Tonali (yellow card) 64'; Longstaff (yellow card) 90'	Stadium: Stamford Bridge; Attendance: 39,526; Referee: Simon Hooper
Note: Fixture was initially scheduled for 26 October, but was moved for live Sky Sports broadcast.

3 November 2024 10	Manchester United	1–1	Chelsea	Trafford
16:30 GMT	Ugarte (yellow card) 42'; Dalot (yellow card) 45+1'; Rashford (yellow card) 67'; Fernandes 70' (pen.); Casemiro (yellow card) 85'; Martínez (yellow card) 90+3'; Amad (yellow card) 90+5'	Report	Gusto (yellow card) 36'; Caicedo 74'; Jackson (yellow card) 90+4'	Stadium: Old Trafford; Attendance: 73,813; Referee: Robert Jones
Note: Fixture was initially scheduled for 2 November, but was moved for live Sky Sports broadcast.

10 November 2024 11	Chelsea	1–1	Arsenal	Fulham
16:30 GMT	Colwill (yellow card) 21'; Neto (yellow card) 33', (goal) 70'; Madueke (yellow card) 45+1'; Cucurella (yellow card) 80'	Report	White (yellow card) 39'; Havertz (yellow card) 56'; Martinelli 60'	Stadium: Stamford Bridge; Attendance: 39,780; Referee: Michael Oliver
Note: Fixture was initially scheduled for 9 November, but was moved for live Sky Sports broadcast.

23 November 2024 12	Leicester City	1–2	Chelsea	Leicester
12:30 GMT	Ndidi (yellow card) 22'; Soumaré (yellow card) 29'; Skipp (yellow card) 31'; Faes (yellow card) 78'; Ayew 90+5' (pen.)	Report	Jackson 15'; Caicedo (yellow card) 40'; Sánchez (yellow card) 66'; Fernández 75'; Lavia (yellow card) 90+4'	Stadium: King Power Stadium; Attendance: 31,880; Referee: Andrew Madley
Note: Fixture was initially scheduled for a 15:00 kick-off, but was moved for live TNT Sports broadcast.

1 December 2024 13	Chelsea	3–0	Aston Villa	Fulham
13:30 GMT	Jackson 7'; Fernández 36'; Palmer 83'; Madueke (yellow card) 85'; Félix (yellow card) 89'	Report	Philogene (yellow card) 54'; Cash (yellow card) 61'	Stadium: Stamford Bridge; Attendance: 40,853; Referee: Stuart Attwell
Note: Fixture was initially scheduled for 30 November, but was moved for live Sky Sports broadcast.

4 December 2024 14	Southampton	1–5	Chelsea	Southampton
19:30 GMT	Aribo 11'; Stephens (red card) 39'; Armstrong (yellow card) 47'	Report	Disasi 7'; Nkunku 17'; Madueke 34'; Palmer 76'; Sancho 87'	Stadium: St Mary's Stadium; Attendance: 31,193; Referee: Tony Harrington
Note: Fixture was initially scheduled for a 19:45 kick-off, but was moved for live Amazon Prime Video broadcast.

8 December 2024 15	Tottenham Hotspur	3–4	Chelsea	Tottenham
16:30 GMT	Solanke 5'; Kulusevski 11'; Sarr (yellow card) 30'; Bissouma (yellow card) 59'; Son Heung-min 90+6'	Report	Sancho 17'; Lavia (yellow card) 21'; Palmer 61' (pen.), 84' (pen.); Fernández 73'; Neto (yellow card) 85'; Sánchez (yellow card) 90+8'	Stadium: Tottenham Hotspur Stadium; Attendance: 61,184; Referee: Anthony Taylor
Note: Fixture was initially scheduled for 7 December, but was moved for live Sky Sports broadcast.

15 December 2024 16	Chelsea	2–1	Brentford	Fulham
19:00 GMT	Cucurella 43', (yellow card) 90+5' (yellow-red card) 90+8'; Jackson 80'	Report	Mbeumo 90'; Janelt (yellow card) 90+6'; Schade (yellow card) 90+8'	Stadium: Stamford Bridge; Attendance: 39,751; Referee: Peter Bankes
Note: Fixture was initially scheduled for 14 December, but was moved due to Chelsea's UEFA Conference League involvement on the Thursday prior.

22 December 2024 17	Everton	0–0	Chelsea	Liverpool
14:00 GMT	Ndiaye (yellow card) 40'; Pickford (yellow card) 45+1'; Young (yellow card) 57'; Beto (yellow card) 88'	Report	Disasi (yellow card) 82'	Stadium: Goodison Park; Attendance: 39,358; Referee: Chris Kavanagh
Note: Fixture was initially scheduled for 21 December, but was moved due to Chelsea's UEFA Conference League involvement on the Thursday prior.

26 December 2024 18	Chelsea	1–2	Fulham	Fulham
15:00 GMT	Palmer 16'; Neto (yellow card) 59'	Report	Lukić (yellow card) 34'; Andersen (yellow card) 38'; Wilson 82'; Robinson (yellow card) 90+1'; Muniz 90+5'	Stadium: Stamford Bridge; Attendance: 39,687; Referee: Sam Barrott
Note: Fixture broadcast live on Amazon Prime Video.

30 December 2024 19	Ipswich Town	2–0	Chelsea	Ipswich
19:45 GMT	Delap 12' (pen.), (yellow card) 83'; O'Shea (yellow card) 32'; Hutchinson 53'; Davis (yellow card) 88'; Morsy (yellow card) 90+7'	Report	Caicedo (yellow card) 67'; Gusto (yellow card) 88'; Colwill (yellow card) 88'; Fernández (yellow card) 90+5'	Stadium: Portman Road; Attendance: 29,968; Referee: John Brooks
Note: Fixture was initially scheduled for 29 December.

4 January 2025 20	Crystal Palace	1–1	Chelsea	Selhurst
15:00 GMT	Mateta 82'	Report	Palmer 14'; Colwill (yellow card) 65'; Fernández (yellow card) 80'	Stadium: Selhurst Park; Attendance: 25,179; Referee: Tim Robinson

14 January 2025 21	Chelsea	2–2	Bournemouth	Fulham
19:30 GMT	Palmer 13'; Jackson (yellow card) 32'; Lavia (yellow card) 52'; James 90+5'	Report	Christie (yellow card) 45+2'; Kluivert 50' (pen.); Brooks (yellow card) 55'; Semenyo 68'; Huijsen (yellow card) 87'	Stadium: Stamford Bridge; Attendance: 39,092; Referee: Robert Jones
Note: Fixture was initially scheduled for 14 January, but was moved for live TNT Sports broadcast.

20 January 2025 22	Chelsea	3–1	Wolverhampton Wanderers	Fulham
20:00 GMT	Adarabioyo 24', (yellow card) 45+7'; Cucurella 60'; Madueke 65'; Caicedo (yellow card) 70'; George (yellow card) 88'; Sánchez (yellow card) 90+4'	Report	André (yellow card) 41'; Doherty 45+5'; Semedo (yellow card) 90'	Stadium: Stamford Bridge; Attendance: 39,221; Referee: Simon Hooper
Note: Fixture was initially scheduled for 18 January, but was moved for live Sky Sports broadcast.

25 January 2025 23	Manchester City	3–1	Chelsea	Manchester
17:30 GMT	Khusanov (yellow card) 4'; Gvardiol 42'; Haaland 68'; Silva (yellow card) 79'; Kovačić (yellow card) 83'; Foden 87'	Report	Madueke 3'; Colwill (yellow card) 25'; Caicedo (yellow card) 58'	Stadium: Etihad Stadium; Attendance: 52,793; Referee: John Brooks
Note: Fixture was initially scheduled for a 15:00 kick-off, but was moved for live Sky Sports broadcast.

3 February 2025 24	Chelsea	2–1	West Ham United	Fulham
20:00 GMT	James (yellow card) 57'; Neto 64'; Fernández (yellow card) 67'; Palmer (yellow card) 68'; Wan-Bissaka 74' (o.g.)	Report	Bowen 42'; Irving (yellow card) 76'	Stadium: Stamford Bridge; Attendance: 39,459; Referee: Stuart Attwell
Note: Fixture was initially scheduled for 1 February, but was moved for live Sky Sports broadcast.

14 February 2025 25	Brighton & Hove Albion	3–0	Chelsea	Brighton and Hove
20:00 GMT	Mitoma 27'; Minteh 38', 63', (yellow card) 81'	Report	Caicedo (yellow card) 43'; Fernández (yellow card) 64'	Stadium: American Express Stadium; Attendance: 31,503; Referee: Chris Kavanagh
Note: Fixture was initially scheduled for 15 February, but was moved for live Sky Sports broadcast.

22 February 2025 26	Aston Villa	2–1	Chelsea	Birmingham
17:30 GMT	Asensio 57', 89'; McGinn (yellow card) 69'	Report	Fernández 9', (yellow card) 56'; Nkunku (yellow card) 72'; Caicedo (yellow card) 89'	Stadium: Villa Park; Attendance: 42,423; Referee: Michael Oliver

25 February 2025 27	Chelsea	4–0	Southampton	Fulham
20:15 GMT	Nkunku 24'; Neto 36'; Colwill 44'; Caicedo (yellow card) 66'; Cucurella 78'	Report	Onuachu (yellow card) 45+2'; Manning (yellow card) 90+1'	Stadium: Stamford Bridge; Attendance: 39,485; Referee: Thomas Bramall
Note: Fixture was initially scheduled for 26 February, but was moved for live TNT Sports broadcast.

9 March 2025 28	Chelsea	1–0	Leicester City	Fulham
14:00 GMT	Palmer (penalty missed) 22'; Cucurella 60'; Acheampong (yellow card) 90+6'	Report		Stadium: Stamford Bridge; Attendance: 39,750; Referee: Tim Robinson
Note: Fixture was initially scheduled for 8 March, but was moved due to Chelsea's UEFA Conference League involvement on the Thursday prior.

16 March 2025 29	Arsenal	1–0	Chelsea	Holloway
13:30 GMT	Merino 20'; Gabriel (yellow card) 54'; Partey (yellow card) 58'; Ødegaard (yellow card) 65'	Report	Colwill (yellow card) 30'; Neto (yellow card) 52'; Fofana (yellow card) 59'	Stadium: Emirates Stadium; Attendance: 60,311; Referee: Chris Kavanagh
Note: Fixture was initially scheduled for 15 March, but was moved for live Sky Sports broadcasting.

3 April 2025 30	Chelsea	1–0	Tottenham Hotspur	Fulham
20:00 BST	Chalobah (yellow card) 45+1'; Fernández 50'; Jackson (yellow card) 67'; Cucurella (yellow card) 73'; Neto (yellow card) 80'; Palmer (yellow card) 86'	Report	Romero (yellow card) 45+1'; Sarr (yellow card) 72'; Porro (yellow card) 90+8'; Johnson (yellow card) 90+8'; Spence (yellow card) 90+13'	Stadium: Stamford Bridge; Attendance: 39,852; Referee: Craig Pawson
Note: Fixture was initially scheduled for 2 April, but was moved for live Sky Sports broadcasting.

6 April 2025 31	Brentford	0–0	Chelsea	Brentford
14:00 BST	Van den Berg (yellow card) 77'	Report	Gusto (yellow card) 26'; Adarabioyo (yellow card) 45'; Fernández (yellow card) 87'	Stadium: Gtech Community Stadium; Attendance: 17,183; Referee: Michael Oliver
Note: Fixture was initially scheduled for 5 April, but was moved due to playing the preceding Thursday.

13 April 2025 32	Chelsea	2–2	Ipswich Town	Fulham
14:00 BST	Tuanzebe 46' (o.g.); Palmer (yellow card) 67'; Sancho 79'; Jackson (yellow card) 86'	Report	Enciso 19'; Johnson 31'; A. Palmer (yellow card) 38'; Morsy (yellow card) 84'	Stadium: Stamford Bridge; Attendance: 39,805; Referee: Stuart Attwell

20 April 2025 33	Fulham	1–2	Chelsea	Fulham
14:00 BST	Iwobi 20'; Bassey (yellow card) 24'	Report	Colwill (yellow card) 29'; Cucurella (yellow card) 80'; George 83'; Caicedo (yellow card) 85'; Neto 90+3'	Stadium: Craven Cottage; Attendance: 27,712; Referee: Anthony Taylor

26 April 2025 34	Chelsea	1–0	Everton	Fulham
12:30 BST	Jackson 27'	Report		Stadium: Stamford Bridge; Attendance: 39,894; Referee: Chris Kavanagh
Note: Fixture was initially scheduled for a 15:00 kick-off, but was moved for live TNT Sports broadcasting.

4 May 2025 35	Chelsea	3–1	Liverpool	Fulham
16:30 BST	Fernández 3'; Chalobah (yellow card) 54'; Quansah 56' (o.g.); Sancho (yellow card) 84'; Palmer 90+6' (pen.)	Report	Van Dijk (yellow card) 51', (goal) 85'; Quansah (yellow card) 58'	Stadium: Stamford Bridge; Attendance: 39,829; Referee: Simon Hooper

11 May 2025 36	Newcastle United	2–0	Chelsea	Newcastle upon Tyne
12:00 BST	Tonali 2'; Schär (yellow card) 53'; Murphy (yellow card) 64'; Bruno Guimarães (yellow card) 84', (goal) 90'; Krafth (yellow card) 89'	Report	Jackson (red card) 35'; Fernández (yellow card) 45+5'; Colwill (yellow card) 90+3'	Stadium: St James' Park; Attendance: 52,231; Referee: John Brooks
Note: Fixture was initially scheduled for 10 May, but was moved due to Chelsea's UEFA Conference League involvement on the Thursday prior.

16 May 2025 37	Chelsea	1–0	Manchester United	Fulham
20:15 BST	Cucurella 71'; Palmer (yellow card) 90+5'	Report	Fernandes (yellow card) 31'; Casemiro (yellow card) 47'; Mazraoui (yellow card) 65'; Amad (yellow card) 69'; Ugarte (yellow card) 90'; Heaven (yellow card) 90+3'	Stadium: Stamford Bridge; Attendance: 39,849; Referee: Chris Kavanagh

25 May 2025 38	Nottingham Forest	0–1	Chelsea	West Bridgford
16:00 BST	Anderson (yellow card) 32'; Aina (yellow card) 79'	Report	Colwill 50'; Caicedo (yellow card) 56'; Adarabioyo (yellow card) 79'	Stadium: City Ground; Attendance: 30,263; Referee: Anthony Taylor

=== FA Cup ===
Chelsea entered the competition at the third round stage, and were drawn at home to Morecambe. In the fourth round, they were drawn away to Brighton & Hove Albion.

Win Draw Loss Fixtures

11 January 2025 Third round	Chelsea	5–0	Morecambe	Fulham
15:00 GMT	Nkunku (penalty missed) 17', 50'; Adarabioyo 38', 70'; Félix 75', 77'	Report		Stadium: Stamford Bridge; Attendance: 38,998; Referee: Andrew Kitchen

8 February 2025 Fourth round	Brighton & Hove Albion	2–1	Chelsea	Brighton and Hove
20:00 GMT	Rutter 12', (yellow card) 20'; Veltman (yellow card) 27'; Mitoma 57'	Report	Verbruggen 5' (o.g.); Dewsbury-Hall (yellow card) 14'; Caicedo (yellow card) 68'	Stadium: American Express Stadium; Attendance: 23,279; Referee: Jarred Gillett

=== EFL Cup ===
Chelsea entered the competition in the third round, and were drawn at home against Barrow. In the fourth round, they were drawn away to Newcastle United.

Win Draw Loss Fixtures

24 September 2024 Third round	Chelsea	5–0	Barrow	Fulham
19:45 BST	Nkunku 8', 15', 75'; Farman 28' (o.g.); Félix (yellow card) 45'; Neto 48'	Report	Foley (yellow card) 27'	Stadium: Stamford Bridge; Attendance: 38,868; Referee: Oliver Langford

30 October 2024 Fourth round	Newcastle United	2–0	Chelsea	Newcastle upon Tyne
19:45 GMT	Schär (yellow card) 16'; Longstaff (yellow card) 19'; Isak 23'; Disasi 26' (o.g.); Gordon (yellow card) 52'; Pope (yellow card) 55'	Report	Badiashile (yellow card) 29'; Félix (yellow card) 85'	Stadium: St James' Park; Attendance: 51,934; Referee: Chris Kavanagh

=== UEFA Conference League ===
Chelsea entered the UEFA Conference League in the play-off qualification round, and were drawn against Swiss club Servette.

Win Draw Loss Fixtures

==== Play-off round ====
22 August 2024 First leg	Chelsea (England)	2–0	(Switzerland) Servette	London, England
20:00 BST	Nkunku 50' (pen.); Madueke 76'; Dewsbury-Hall (yellow card) 90+3'	Report		Stadium: Stamford Bridge; Attendance: 37,902; Referee: Jérémie Pignard (France)

29 August 2024 Second leg	Servette (Switzerland)	2–1 (2–3 agg.)	(England) Chelsea	Geneva, Switzerland
20:30 CEST	Severin (yellow card) 9'; Guillemenot 32'; Crivelli (yellow card) 64', (goal) 72'; Douline (yellow card) 65'	Report	Nkunku 14' (pen.); Badiashile (yellow card) 18'; Jackson (yellow card) 74'; Veiga (yellow card) 85'	Stadium: Stade de Genève; Attendance: 28,000; Referee: Marco Di Bello (Italy)

==== League phase ====
The league phase draw was held on 30 August 2024.

Pos	Team	Pld	W	D	L	GF	GA	GD	Pts	Qualification
1	(The Football Association) Chelsea	6	6	0	0	26	5	+21	18	Advance to round of 16 (seeded)
2	(Portuguese Football Federation) Vitória de Guimarães	6	4	2	0	13	6	+7	14	Advance to round of 16 (seeded)
3	(Italian Football Federation) Fiorentina	6	4	1	1	18	7	+11	13	Advance to round of 16 (seeded)
4	(Austrian Football Association) Rapid Wien	6	4	1	1	11	5	+6	13	Advance to round of 16 (seeded)
5	(Swedish Football Association) Djurgårdens IF	6	4	1	1	11	7	+4	13 (Note: Away goals scored: Djurgårdens IF 5, Lugano 4.)	Advance to round of 16 (seeded)

Source: UEFA
Rules for classification: League phase tiebreakers

===== Results summary =====
Overall								Home						Away					
Pld	W	D	L	GF	GA	GD	Pts	W	D	L	GF	GA	GD	W	D	L	GF	GA	GD
6	6	0	0	26	5	+21	18	3	0	0	17	3	+14	3	0	0	9	2	+7

Source: UEFA

Round	1	2	3	4	5	6
Ground	H	A	H	A	A	H
Result	W	W	W	W	W	W
Position	6	1	1	1	1	1
Points	3	6	9	12	15	18

Source: UEFA
A = Away; H = Home; W = Win; D = Draw; L = Loss

Win Draw Loss Fixtures

3 October 2024 1	Chelsea (England)	4–2	(Belgium) Gent	London, England
20:00 BST	Veiga 12'; Neto 46'; Nkunku 63'; Dewsbury-Hall 70'; Disasi (yellow card) 72'	Report	Watanabe 50'; Gandelman 90'; Brown (yellow card) 90+4'	Stadium: Stamford Bridge; Attendance: 38,546; Referee: Daniel Schlager (Germany)

24 October 2024 2	Panathinaikos (Greece)	1–4	(England) Chelsea	Athens, Greece
19:45 EEST	Mladenovic (yellow card) 58'; Pellistri 69'	Report	Félix 22', 55'; Mudryk 49'; Nkunku 59' (pen.); Disasi (yellow card) 90+3'	Stadium: Olympic Stadium; Attendance: 59,742; Referee: António Nobre (Portugal)

7 November 2024 3	Chelsea (England)	8–0	(Armenia) Noah	London, England
20:00 GMT	Adarabioyo 12'; Guiu 13'; Disasi 18'; Félix 21', 41'; Mudryk 39'; Nkunku 69', 76' (pen.)	Report	Sangaré (yellow card) 60'; Çinari (yellow card) 90+4'	Stadium: Stamford Bridge; Attendance: 38,305; Referee: Christian-Petru Ciochirca (Austria)

28 November 2024 4	1. FC Heidenheim (Germany)	0–2	(England) Chelsea	Heidenheim, Germany
18:45 CET	Traoré (yellow card) 42'; Schöppner (yellow card) 85'	Report	Badiashile (yellow card) 1'; Casadei (yellow card) 45' (yellow-red card) 90+6'; Nkunku 51'; Jörgensen (yellow card) 82'; Veiga (yellow card) 85'; Mudryk 86'	Stadium: Voith-Arena; Attendance: 15,000; Referee: Serdar Gözübüyük (Netherlands)

12 December 2024 5	Astana (Kazakhstan)	1–3	(England) Chelsea	Almaty, Kazakhstan
21:30 KZT	Amanović (yellow card) 27'; Tomasov 45'	Report	Guiu 14', 18'; Veiga 39'	Stadium: Almaty Central Stadium; Attendance: 20,982; Referee: Sven Jablonski (Germany)
Note: The match was played at Almaty Central Stadium in Almaty, instead of Astana's regular stadium, Astana Arena in Astana, due to renovation works.

19 December 2024 6	Chelsea (England)	5–1	(Republic of Ireland) Shamrock Rovers	London, England
20:00 GMT	Guiu 22', 34', 45+3'; Dewsbury-Hall 40'; Cucurella 58'	Report	Poom 26', (yellow card) 30'; Lopes (yellow card) 62'	Stadium: Stamford Bridge; Attendance: 38,467; Referee: Willy Delajod (France)

==== Knockout phase ====
===== Round of 16 =====
The round of 16 draw was held on 21 February 2025.

6 March 2025 First leg	Copenhagen (Denmark)	1–2	(England) Chelsea	Copenhagen, Denmark
18:45 CET	Diks (yellow card) 77'; Pereira 79'; Chiakha (yellow card) 87'; Chatzidiakos (yellow card) 90'; López (yellow card) 90'	Report	James 46'; Fernández 65', (yellow card) 87'	Stadium: Parken Stadium; Attendance: 35,859; Referee: Georgi Kabakov (Bulgaria)

13 March 2025 Second leg	Chelsea (England)	1–0 (3–1 agg.)	(Denmark) Copenhagen	London, England
20:00 GMT	Dewsbury-Hall 55'; Cucurella (yellow card) 69'; Adarabioyo (yellow card) 85'	Report	Achouri (yellow card) 76'	Stadium: Stamford Bridge; Attendance: 35,280; Referee: Radu Petrescu (Romania)

===== Quarter-finals =====
The draw for the order of the quarter-final legs was held on 21 February 2025, after the round of 16 draw. However, the order of legs in Chelsea's tie was later reversed in order to avoid a scheduling conflict with the Europa League's Tottenham Hotspur v Eintracht Frankfurt match in the same city.

10 April 2025 First leg	Legia Warsaw (Poland)	0–3	(England) Chelsea	Warsaw, Poland
18:45 CEST		Report	George 49'; Madueke 57', 74'; Nkunku (penalty missed) 73'	Stadium: Polish Army Stadium; Attendance: 29,055; Referee: Serdar Gözübüyük (Netherlands)

17 April 2025 Second leg	Chelsea (England)	1–2 (4–2 agg.)	(Poland) Legia Warsaw	London, England
20:00 BST	Jörgensen (yellow card) 9'; Cucurella 33'; Badiashile (yellow card) 48'	Report	Pekhart 10' (pen.); Kapuadi 53'	Stadium: Stamford Bridge; Attendance: 32,549; Referee: Alejandro Hernández Hernández (Spain)

===== Semi-finals =====
The draw for the order of the semi-final legs was held on 21 February 2025, after the draw for the round of 16 and quarter-finals. However, the order of legs in Chelsea's tie was later reversed in order to avoid a scheduling conflict with the Europa League's Tottenham Hotspur v Bodø/Glimt match in the same city.

1 May 2025 First leg	Djurgårdens IF (Sweden)	1–4	(England) Chelsea	Stockholm, Sweden
21:00 CET	Alemayehu 68'; Gulliksen (yellow card) 90'	Report	Sancho 13'; Madueke 43'; Jackson 59', 65'; Caicedo (yellow card) 82'; Adarabioyo (yellow card) 90'	Stadium: 3Arena; Attendance: 26,703; Referee: Sandro Schärer (Switzerland)

8 May 2025 Second leg	Chelsea (England)	1–0 (5–1 agg.)	(Sweden) Djurgårdens IF	London, England
20:00 BST	Adarabioyo (yellow card) 17'; Dewsbury-Hall 38'	Report	Stensson (yellow card) 53'	Stadium: Stamford Bridge; Attendance: 32,464; Referee: João Pinheiro (Portugal)

===== Final =====
28 May 2025 Final	Real Betis (Spain)	1–4	(England) Chelsea	Wrocław, Poland
21:00 CEST	Ezzalzouli 9'; Antony (yellow card) 88'; Perraud (yellow card) 90+5'	Report	Badiashile (yellow card) 55'; Fernández 65'; Jackson 70'; Palmer (yellow card) 79'; Sancho 83', (yellow card) 85'; Caicedo 90+1'	Stadium: Wrocław Stadium; Attendance: 39,754; Referee: Irfan Peljto (Bosnia and Herzegovina)

=== FIFA Club World Cup ===
Win Draw Loss Fixtures

==== Group stage ====
The group stage draw was held on 5 December 2024. Chelsea were in Pot 2, being the 5th highest-ranked UEFA team in the competition. They were drawn into Group D alongside 2022 Copa Libertadores winners Flamengo and 2023–24 CAF Champions League runners-up Espérance de Tunis, from Brazil and Tunisia respectively. 2023 CONCACAF Champions League winners Club León were removed from the tournament by FIFA on 21 March 2025. They were replaced by Los Angeles FC.

Pos	Team	Pld	W	D	L	GF	GA	GD	Pts	Qualification
1	(Brazil) Flamengo	3	2	1	0	6	2	+4	7	Advance to knockout stage
2	(England) Chelsea	3	2	0	1	6	3	+3	6	Advance to knockout stage
3	(Tunisia) Espérance de Tunis	3	1	0	2	1	5	−4	3	
4	(United States) Los Angeles FC	3	0	1	2	1	4	−3	1	

Source: FIFA
Rules for classification: Group stage tiebreakers

16 June 2025 1	Chelsea (England)	2–0	(United States) Los Angeles FC	Atlanta, United States
15:00 EDT	Neto 34'; James (yellow card) 36'; Adarabioyo (yellow card) 45+1'; Cucurella (yellow card) 75'; Fernández 79'	Report	Martínez (yellow card) 58'; Palencia (yellow card) 90+2'	Stadium: Mercedes-Benz Stadium; Attendance: 22,137; Referee: Jesús Valenzuela (Venezuela)

20 June 2025 2	Flamengo (Brazil)	3–1	(England) Chelsea	Philadelphia, United States
14:00 EDT	Bruno Henrique 62'; Danilo 65'; Gerson (yellow card) 74'; Wallace Yan 83'; Pulgar (yellow card) 85'; Plata (yellow card) 90+2'	Report	Caicedo (yellow card) 11'; Neto 13', (yellow card) 23'; Delap (yellow card) 45+2'; Jackson (red card) 68'	Stadium: Lincoln Financial Field; Attendance: 54,619; Referee: Iván Barton (El Salvador)

24 June 2025 3	Espérance de Tunis (Tunisia)	0–3	(England) Chelsea	Philadelphia, United States
21:00 EDT	Derbali (yellow card) 87'; Ogbelu (yellow card) 90+2'; Ben Ali (yellow card) 90+6'	Report	Adarabioyo 45+3'; Delap 45+5'; George 90+7'	Stadium: Lincoln Financial Field; Attendance: 32,967; Referee: Yael Falcón Pérez (Argentina)

==== Knockout phase ====
===== Round of 16 =====
28 June 2025 Round of 16	Benfica (Portugal)	1–4 (a.e.t.)	(England) Chelsea	Charlotte, United States
16:00 EDT	Pavlidis (yellow card) 50'; Florentino (yellow card) 62'; Kökçü (yellow card) 82'; A. Silva (yellow card) 90+2'; Di María 90+5' (pen.); Prestianni (yellow card) 90+6' (yellow-red card) 91'; Gouveia (yellow card) 120+1'	Report	Caicedo (yellow card) 61'; James 64'; Palmer (yellow card) 92'; Colwill (yellow card) 102'; Nkunku 108'; Neto 114'; Dewsbury-Hall 117'	Stadium: Bank of America Stadium; Attendance: 25,929; Referee: Slavko Vinčić (Slovenia)
Note: The match was interrupted at 17:53 EDT in the 85th minute due to adverse weather conditions. The match was resumed at 19:48 EDT.

===== Quarter-finals =====
4 July 2025 Quarter-finals	Palmeiras (Brazil)	1–2	(England) Chelsea	Philadelphia, United States
21:00 EDT	Estêvão 53'; Ríos (yellow card) 78'	Report	Palmer 16'; Gusto (yellow card) 41'; Delap (yellow card) 45+2'; Weverton 83' (o.g.); Colwill (yellow card) 86'	Stadium: Lincoln Financial Field; Attendance: 65,782; Referee: Alireza Faghani (Australia)

===== Semi-finals =====
8 July 2025 Semi-finals	Fluminense (Brazil)	0–2	(England) Chelsea	East Rutherford, United States
15:00 EDT	Nonato (yellow card) 59'; Soteldo (yellow card) 72'	Report	João Pedro 18', 56'; Sánchez (yellow card) 73'	Stadium: MetLife Stadium; Attendance: 70,556; Referee: François Letexier (France)

===== Final =====
13 July 2025 Final	Chelsea (England)	3–0	(France) Paris Saint-Germain	East Rutherford, United States
15:00 EDT	Palmer 22', 30'; Neto (yellow card) 34'; Caicedo (yellow card) 36'; Gusto (yellow card) 40'; João Pedro 43'; Colwill (yellow card) 81'	Report	Neves (red card) 85'; Dembélé (yellow card) 87'; Mendes (yellow card) 90+4'	Stadium: MetLife Stadium; Attendance: 81,118; Referee: Alireza Faghani (Australia)

== Statistics ==
=== Appearances ===
No.	Pos.	Player	Premier League	FA Cup	EFL Cup	Conference League	Club World Cup	Total
1	GK	(Spain) Robert Sánchez	32	1	0	1	6	40
3	DF	(Spain) Marc Cucurella	33+3	1+1	1	6+3	6	47+7
4	DF	(England) Tosin Adarabioyo	15+7	2	1	12	3+1	33+8
5	DF	(France) Benoît Badiashile	3+2	0	2	13	2	20+2
6	DF	(England) Levi Colwill	35	0	0	0+3	5	40+3
7	FW	(Portugal) Pedro Neto	24+11	2	1	6+1	6	39+12
8	MF	(Argentina) Enzo Fernández	32+4	0+1	1	6+2	6+1	45+8
9	FW	(England) Liam Delap	0	0	0	0	4+2	4+2
10	MF	(England) Cole Palmer	36+1	1	0	4+4	6	47+5
11	FW	(England) Noni Madueke	27+5	0+1	0+1	4+3	2+3	33+13
12	GK	(Denmark) Filip Jörgensen	6	1	2	14	1	24
13	GK	(England) Marcus Bettinelli	0	0	0	0	0	0
14	MF	(Portugal) Dário Essugo	0	0	0	0	0+3	0+3
15	FW	(Senegal) Nicolas Jackson	28+2	0	0	2+2	1+2	31+6
17	MF	(Brazil) Andrey Santos	0	0	0	0	1+3	1+3
18	FW	(France) Christopher Nkunku	9+18	2	2	9+2	3+3	25+23
19	DF	(France) Mamadou Sarr	0	0	0	0	0+1	0+1
20	FW	(Brazil) João Pedro	0	0	0	0	2+1	2+1
22	MF	(England) Kiernan Dewsbury-Hall	2+11	1	2	13+2	1+4	19+17
23	DF	(England) Trevoh Chalobah	12+2	1	0	3+2	4+1	19+5
24	DF	(England) Reece James	12+7	1	0	5+2	4+1	22+10
25	MF	(Ecuador) Moisés Caicedo	38	1	0	4+2	5	48+2
27	DF	(France) Malo Gusto	19+13	1+1	1	4+2	5+2	30+18
29	DF	(France) Wesley Fofana	14	0	0	0	0	14+0
30	DF	(Argentina) Aarón Anselmino	0	0	0	0	0+1	0+1
32	MF	(England) Tyrique George	1+7	1+1	0+1	8+5	0+2	10+16
33	MF	(England) Kiano Dyer	0	0	0	0+1	0	0+1
34	DF	(England) Josh Acheampong	2+2	0	0+1	7	1	10+3
37	MF	(England) Omari Kellyman	0	0	0	0	0	0
38	FW	(Spain) Marc Guiu	0+3	1	0+1	6+3	0+2	7+9
39	GK	(Belgium) Mike Penders	0	0	0	0	0	0
44	GK	(United States) Gabriel Slonina	0	0	0	0	0	0
45	MF	(Belgium) Roméo Lavia	11+5	1	0	0+1	3+1	15+7
47	GK	(Finland) Lucas Bergström	0	0	0	0	0	0+0
51	MF	(England) Samuel Rak-Sakyi	0	0	0	1+3	0	1+3
55	FW	(England) Ato Ampah	0	0	0	0+1	0	0+1
59	DF	(England) Harrison Murray-Campbell	0	0	0	0+1	0	0+1
64	DF	(Sweden) Genesis Antwi	0	0	0	0+2	0	0+2
76	FW	(England) Shim Mheuka	0+1	0	0	1+3	0	1+4
81	MF	(England) Reggie Walsh	0	0	0	1+1	0	1+1
	MF	(France) Mathis Amougou	0+1	0	0	0+1	0	0+2
	FW	(Ukraine) Mykhailo Mudryk	1+6	0	2	6	0	9+6
	FW	(England) Jadon Sancho	19+12	1+1	0	6+2	0	26+15
Players who have left the club
	MF	(Italy) Cesare Casadei	0	0	1	3+2	0	4+2
	DF	(England) Ben Chilwell	0	0	0+1	0	0	0+1
	MF	(England) Carney Chukwuemeka	0	0	0+1	1+3	0	1+4
	DF	(France) Axel Disasi	4+2	1	2	8	0	15+2
	MF	(Portugal) João Félix	3+9	1	2	3+2	0	9+11
	MF	(England) Harvey Vale	0	0	0	0+2	0	0+2
	DF	(Portugal) Renato Veiga	1+6	1	2	8	0	12+6

Source: FBref.com

=== Goalscorers ===
Rank	No.	Pos.	Player	Premier League	FA Cup	EFL Cup	Conference League	Club World Cup	Total
1	10	MF	(England) Cole Palmer	15	0	0	0	3	18
2	18	FW	(France) Christopher Nkunku	3	1	3	7	1	15
3	15	FW	(Senegal) Nicolas Jackson	10	0	0	3	0	13
4	11	FW	(England) Noni Madueke	7	0	0	4	0	11
5	7	FW	(Portugal) Pedro Neto	4	0	1	1	3	9
5	8	MF	(Argentina) Enzo Fernández	6	0	0	2	1	9
7	3	DF	(Spain) Marc Cucurella	5	0	0	2	0	7
7		FW	(Portugal) João Félix	1	2	0	4	0	7
9	38	FW	(Spain) Marc Guiu	0	0	0	6	0	6
10	4	DF	(England) Tosin Adarabioyo	1	2	0	1	1	5
10	22	MF	(England) Kiernan Dewsbury-Hall	0	0	0	4	1	5
10		FW	(England) Jadon Sancho	3	0	0	2	0	5
13	20	FW	(Brazil) João Pedro	0	0	0	0	3	3
13	24	DF	(England) Reece James	1	0	0	1	1	3
13	32	FW	(England) Tyrique George	1	0	0	1	1	3
13		MF	(Ukraine) Mykhailo Mudryk	0	0	0	3	0	3
17	6	DF	(England) Levi Colwill	2	0	0	0	0	2
17	25	MF	(Ecuador) Moisés Caicedo	1	0	0	1	0	2
17		DF	(France) Axel Disasi	1	0	0	1	0	2
17		DF	(Portugal) Renato Veiga	0	0	0	2	0	2
21	9	FW	(England) Liam Delap	0	0	0	0	1	1
Own goals				3	1	1	0	1	6
Totals				64	6	5	45	17	134

Source: FBref.com

==== Hat-tricks ====
- Score – The score at the time of each goal. Chelsea's score listed first.

Date	No.	Pos.	Player	Score	Final score	Opponent	Competition
25 August 2024	11	FW	(England) Noni Madueke	3–2, 4–2, 5–2 (A)	6–2 (A)	Wolverhampton Wanderers	Premier League
24 September 2024	18	FW	(France) Christopher Nkunku	1–0, 2–0, 5–0 (H)	5–0 (H)	Barrow	EFL Cup
28 September 2024	20	MF	(England) Cole Palmer^{4}	1–1, 2–1, 3–1, 4–2 (H)	4–2 (H)	Brighton & Hove Albion	Premier League
19 December 2024	38	FW	(Spain) Marc Guiu	1–0, 2–1, 4–1 (H)	5–1 (H)	(Republic of Ireland) Shamrock Rovers	UEFA Conference League

Source: FBref.com

=== Top assists ===
Rank	No.	Pos.	Player	Premier League	FA Cup	EFL Cup	Conference League	Club World Cup	Total
1	8	MF	(Argentina) Enzo Fernández	7	0	0	7	3	17
2	10	MF	(England) Cole Palmer	8	0	0	3	2	13
3		FW	(England) Jadon Sancho	4	0	0	5	0	9
4	7	FW	(Portugal) Pedro Neto	6	0	0	2	0	8
5	15	FW	(Senegal) Nicolas Jackson	5	0	0	0	1	6
6	3	DF	(Spain) Marc Cucurella	3	1	0	1	0	5
6	18	FW	(France) Christopher Nkunku	2	0	0	3	0	5
6	25	MF	(Ecuador) Moisés Caicedo	3	0	0	1	1	5
6	32	FW	(England) Tyrique George	1	2	0	2	0	5
6		MF	(Ukraine) Mykhailo Mudryk	0	0	1	4	0	5
11	11	FW	(England) Noni Madueke	3	0	0	1	0	4
12	22	MF	(England) Kiernan Dewsbury-Hall	1	0	0	2	0	3
12	27	DF	(France) Malo Gusto	1	0	1	0	1	3
14	6	DF	(England) Levi Colwill	1	0	0	0	1	2
14	23	DF	(England) Trevoh Chalobah	1	0	0	0	1	2
14	24	DF	(England) Reece James	1	1	0	0	0	2
14		DF	(France) Axel Disasi	0	0	0	2	0	2
14		FW	(Portugal) João Félix	1	0	1	0	0	2
19	4	DF	(England) Tosin Adarabioyo	1	0	0	0	0	1
19	9	FW	(England) Liam Delap	0	0	0	0	1	1
19	17	MF	(Brazil) Andrey Santos	0	0	0	0	1	1
19	45	MF	(Belgium) Roméo Lavia	1	0	0	0	0	1
19		DF	(Portugal) Renato Veiga	0	0	0	1	0	1
Totals				50	4	3	34	12	103

Source: FBref.com

=== Clean sheets ===
Rank	No.	Pos.	Player	Premier League	FA Cup	EFL Cup	Conference League	Club World Cup	Total
1	1	GK	(Spain) Robert Sánchez	10	0	0	0	3	13
2	12	GK	(Denmark) Filip Jörgensen	1	1	1	6	1	10
Totals				11	1	1	6	4	23

Source: FBref.com

=== Discipline ===
No.	Pos.	Player	Premier League			FA Cup			EFL Cup			Conference League			Club World Cup			Total		
No.	Pos.	Player	Yellow card	(yellow card) (yellow-red card)	Red card	Yellow card	(yellow card) (yellow-red card)	Red card	Yellow card	(yellow card) (yellow-red card)	Red card	Yellow card	(yellow card) (yellow-red card)	Red card	Yellow card	(yellow card) (yellow-red card)	Red card	Yellow card	(yellow card) (yellow-red card)	Red card
1	GK	(Spain) Robert Sánchez	5	0	0	0	0	0	0	0	0	0	0	0	1	0	0	6	0	0
3	DF	(Spain) Marc Cucurella	8	1	0	0	0	0	0	0	0	1	0	0	0	0	0	9	1	0
4	DF	(England) Tosin Adarabioyo	4	0	0	0	0	0	0	0	0	3	0	0	1	0	0	8	0	0
5	DF	(France) Benoît Badiashile	0	0	0	0	0	0	1	0	0	4	0	0	0	0	0	5	0	0
6	DF	(England) Levi Colwill	9	0	0	0	0	0	0	0	0	0	0	0	3	0	0	12	0	0
7	FW	(Portugal) Pedro Neto	8	0	0	0	0	0	0	0	0	0	0	0	2	0	0	10	0	0
8	MF	(Argentina) Enzo Fernández	8	0	0	0	0	0	0	0	0	1	0	0	0	0	0	9	0	0
9	FW	(England) Liam Delap	0	0	0	0	0	0	0	0	0	0	0	0	2	0	0	2	0	0
10	MF	(England) Cole Palmer	8	0	0	0	0	0	0	0	0	1	0	0	1	0	0	10	0	0
11	FW	(England) Noni Madueke	3	0	0	0	0	0	0	0	0	0	0	0	0	0	0	3	0	0
12	GK	(Denmark) Filip Jörgensen	0	0	0	0	0	0	0	0	0	2	0	0	0	0	0	2	0	0
13	GK	(England) Marcus Bettinelli	0	0	0	0	0	0	0	0	0	0	0	0	0	0	0	0	0	0
14	MF	(Portugal) Dário Essugo	0	0	0	0	0	0	0	0	0	0	0	0	0	0	0	0	0	0
15	FW	(Senegal) Nicolas Jackson	7	0	1	0	0	0	0	0	0	1	0	0	0	0	1	8	0	2
17	MF	(Brazil) Andrey Santos	0	0	0	0	0	0	0	0	0	0	0	0	0	0	0	0	0	0
18	FW	(France) Christopher Nkunku	2	0	0	0	0	0	0	0	0	0	0	0	0	0	0	2	0	0
19	DF	(France) Mamadou Sarr	0	0	0	0	0	0	0	0	0	0	0	0	0	0	0	0	0	0
20	FW	(Brazil) João Pedro	0	0	0	0	0	0	0	0	0	0	0	0	0	0	0	0	0	0
22	MF	(England) Kiernan Dewsbury-Hall	0	0	0	1	0	0	0	0	0	1	0	0	0	0	0	2	0	0
23	DF	(England) Trevoh Chalobah	2	0	0	0	0	0	0	0	0	0	0	0	0	0	0	2	0	0
24	DF	(England) Reece James	1	0	0	0	0	0	0	0	0	0	0	0	1	0	0	2	0	0
25	MF	(Ecuador) Moisés Caicedo	11	0	0	1	0	0	0	0	0	1	0	0	3	0	0	16	0	0
27	DF	(France) Malo Gusto	4	0	0	0	0	0	0	0	0	0	0	0	2	0	0	6	0	0
29	DF	(France) Wesley Fofana	7	0	0	0	0	0	0	0	0	0	0	0	0	0	0	7	0	0
30	DF	(Argentina) Aarón Anselmino	0	0	0	0	0	0	0	0	0	0	0	0	0	0	0	0	0	0
32	FW	(England) Tyrique George	1	0	0	0	0	0	0	0	0	0	0	0	0	0	0	1	0	0
33	MF	(England) Kiano Dyer	0	0	0	0	0	0	0	0	0	0	0	0	0	0	0	0	0	0
34	DF	(England) Josh Acheampong	1	0	0	0	0	0	0	0	0	0	0	0	0	0	0	1	0	0
37	MF	(England) Omari Kellyman	0	0	0	0	0	0	0	0	0	0	0	0	0	0	0	0	0	0
38	FW	(Spain) Marc Guiu	0	0	0	0	0	0	0	0	0	0	0	0	0	0	0	0	0	0
39	MF	(Belgium) Mike Penders	0	0	0	0	0	0	0	0	0	0	0	0	0	0	0	0	0	0
44	GK	(United States) Gabriel Slonina	0	0	0	0	0	0	0	0	0	0	0	0	0	0	0	0	0	0
45	MF	(Belgium) Roméo Lavia	4	0	0	0	0	0	0	0	0	0	0	0	0	0	0	4	0	0
47	GK	(Finland) Lucas Bergström	0	0	0	0	0	0	0	0	0	0	0	0	0	0	0	0	0	0
51	MF	(England) Samuel Rak-Sakyi	0	0	0	0	0	0	0	0	0	0	0	0	0	0	0	0	0	0
55	FW	(England) Ato Ampah	0	0	0	0	0	0	0	0	0	0	0	0	0	0	0	0	0	0
64	DF	(Sweden) Genesis Antwi	0	0	0	0	0	0	0	0	0	0	0	0	0	0	0	0	0	0
76	FW	(England) Shim Mheuka	0	0	0	0	0	0	0	0	0	0	0	0	0	0	0	0	0	0
81	MF	(England) Reggie Walsh	0	0	0	0	0	0	0	0	0	0	0	0	0	0	0	0	0	0
	MF	(France) Mathis Amougou	0	0	0	0	0	0	0	0	0	0	0	0	0	0	0	0	0	0
	MF	(Ukraine) Mykhailo Mudryk	0	0	0	0	0	0	0	0	0	0	0	0	0	0	0	0	0	0
	FW	(England) Jadon Sancho	2	0	0	0	0	0	0	0	0	1	0	0	0	0	0	3	0	0
Players who have left the club
	MF	(Italy) Cesare Casadei	0	0	0	0	0	0	0	0	0	1	1	0	0	0	0	1	1	0
	DF	(England) Ben Chilwell	0	0	0	0	0	0	0	0	0	0	0	0	0	0	0	0	0	0
	MF	(England) Carney Chukwuemeka	0	0	0	0	0	0	0	0	0	0	0	0	0	0	0	0	0	0
	DF	(France) Axel Disasi	1	0	0	0	0	0	0	0	0	2	0	0	0	0	0	3	0	0
	FW	(Portugal) João Félix	2	0	0	0	0	0	2	0	0	0	0	0	0	0	0	4	0	0
	MF	(England) Harvey Vale	0	0	0	0	0	0	0	0	0	0	0	0	0	0	0	0	0	0
	DF	(Portugal) Renato Veiga	2	0	0	0	0	0	0	0	0	2	0	0	0	0	0	4	0	0
Totals			100	1	1	2	0	0	3	0	0	21	1	0	16	0	1	142	2	2

Source: FBref.com

== Awards ==
=== Players ===
No.	Pos.	Player	Award	Source
1	GK	(Spain) Robert Sánchez	October 2024 Premier League Save of the Month	
1	GK	(Spain) Robert Sánchez	2025 FIFA Club World Cup Golden Glove	
15	FW	(Senegal) Nicolas Jackson	October 2024 Premier League Goal of the Month	
20	MF	(England) Cole Palmer	August 2024 Premier League Goal of the Month	
20	MF	(England) Cole Palmer	September 2024 Premier League Player of the Month	
20	MF	(England) Cole Palmer	2025 London Football Awards Premier League Player of the Year	
20	MF	(England) Cole Palmer	2025 London Football Awards Goal of the season	
20	MF	(England) Cole Palmer	2025 FIFA Club World Cup Golden Ball	
25	MF	(Ecuador) Moisés Caicedo	2025 FIFA Club World Cup Bronze Ball	

=== Manager ===
Manager	Award	Source
(Italy) Enzo Maresca	September 2024 Premier League Manager of the Month	
