= Noni Madueke =

English footballer (born 2002)

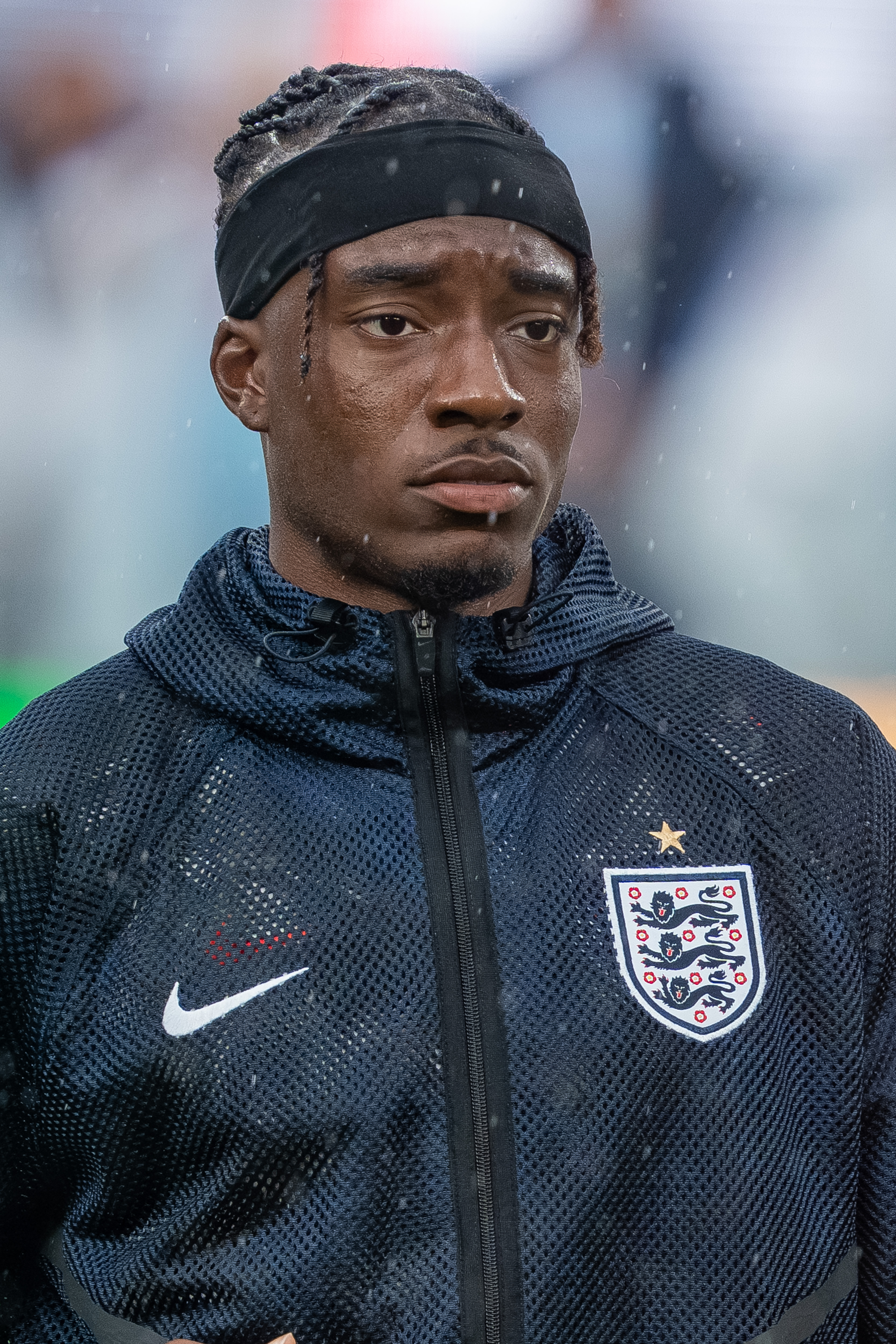
- Madueke with England in 2026

Personal information
- Full name: Chukwunonso Azuka Tristan Madueke
- Date of birth: 10 March 2002 (age 24)
- Place of birth: Barnet, London, England
- Height: 6 ft 0 in (1.82 m)
- Position: Winger

Team information
- Current team: Arsenal
- Number: 20

Youth career
- 2011–2014: Crystal Palace
- 2014–2018: Tottenham Hotspur
- 2018–2019: PSV Eindhoven

Senior career*
Years	Team	Apps	(Gls)
2019–2020	Jong PSV	6	(4)
2019–2023	PSV Eindhoven	51	(11)
2023–2025	Chelsea	67	(13)
2025–	Arsenal	34	(5)

International career^{‡}
2017–2018	England U16	3	(0)
2018–2019	England U17	11	(2)
2019	England U18	9	(4)
2021–2024	England U21	20	(7)
2024–	England	16	(1)
Medal record
Men's football
Representing England
FIFA World Cup
Third place	2026 Canada–Mexico–US
UEFA European Under-21 Championship
Winner	2023 Georgia–Romania
- * Club domestic league appearances and goals as of 19:38, 21 November 2026 (UTC) ‡ National team caps and goals as of 00:05, 12 July 2026 (UTC)

Chukwunonso Azuka Tristan "Noni" Madueke (English: /nɒni mədwəɪkəɪ/; born 10 March 2002) is an English professional footballer who plays as a winger for Premier League club Arsenal and the England national team.

After playing youth football with Crystal Palace and Tottenham Hotspur, Madueke began his professional career with Dutch club PSV Eindhoven. He joined Chelsea in 2023, after four and a half years at PSV. Madueke was a part of Chelsea's UEFA Conference League and FIFA Club World Cup-winning teams in 2025. In July 2025, he moved to fellow London side Arsenal for a reported initial fee of £48.5m and won the Premier League title in his first season.

Born in London to Nigerian parents, Madueke chose to represent England at the youth level. In August 2024, Madueke made his senior international debut in the 2024–25 UEFA Nations League against Finland and scored his first senior goal against Serbia in 2026 FIFA World Cup qualification.

== Early life ==
Madueke is of Igbo Nigerian descent. He was born in Barnet, London, and was educated at St Columba's College, a private day school in St Albans, Hertfordshire. Upon signing for PSV Eindhoven, Madueke moved to the small village of Wintelre with his mother.

== Club career ==
=== Early career ===
Madueke joined Crystal Palace at age nine and spent three years at the club. He subsequently joined Tottenham Hotspur; he captained their under-16 side and made his under-18 debut at age 15.

=== PSV Eindhoven ===
Madueke signed with Eredivisie club PSV Eindhoven in June 2018 on a three-year contract, rejecting an offer from Manchester United in the process. On 26 August 2019, Madueke made his senior debut in the Eerste Divisie for Jong PSV, coming on as a 64th minute substitute in a 1–0 loss to MVV.

After making his debut for PSV's first team on 19 January 2020, in a 1–1 draw against VVV-Venlo, Madueke broke into the PSV team fully during the 2020–21 season, scoring on his first start for the club in a 2–1 win against Emmen on 19 September 2020. Madueke finished the season with seven Eredivisie goals. He was later described as having a "breakout" campaign, with nine goals and eight assists in all competitions.

On 7 August 2021, Madueke scored twice in a 4–0 Johan Cruyff Shield win against Ajax, helping to end Ajax's 17-game unbeaten streak. On 26 August, Madueke signed a new contract with PSV, keeping him at the club until 2025. He was also given the number 10 jersey.

=== Chelsea ===
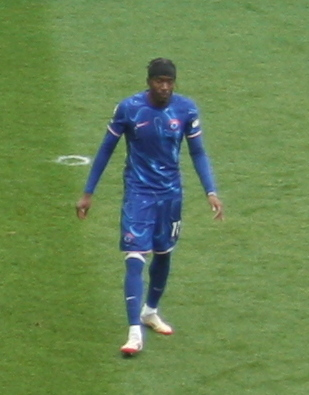
Madueke playing for Chelsea in 2025

On 20 January 2023, Premier League club Chelsea signed Madueke on a seven-and-a-half-year contract, for an estimated transfer fee of £28.5 million (€33 million). He scored his first goal for the club on 2 May, in a 3–1 league defeat away to Arsenal.

Ahead of the 2024–25 season, Madueke stated that a dispute between teammates Enzo Fernández and Wesley Fofana (with Fofana accusing Fernandez of racism), would be resolved.

Madueke scored the first hat-trick of his senior career in a 6–2 away win over Wolverhampton Wanderers on 25 August 2024, having come under fire earlier in the day for disparaging the city of Wolverhampton in an Instagram story. The story was later deleted and he apologised after the match.

In December 2024, Madueke was told by manager Enzo Maresca to "work harder" after losing his first-team place. In February 2025, he was injured, and ruled out until late March.

=== Arsenal ===
On 5 July 2025, it was reported by the BBC that Madueke agreed personal terms with Arsenal, although the two clubs had not yet agreed a transfer fee. On 9 July it was confirmed that Arsenal had made a formal approach to Chelsea, with an agreement in principle for a £50 million transfer being agreed the next day. The prospective move was criticised by some Arsenal fans, who started a '#NoToMadueke' campaign. The campaign was later criticised by Arsenal teammate Declan Rice.

On 18 July 2025, Madueke was announced as an Arsenal player, signing a five-year contract for a reported initial fee of £48.5 million, rising to £52 million with add-ons. On 17 August, he made his debut for the club, as a substitute, in a 1–0 win against Manchester United in the league.

On 23 September 2025, it was announced that Madueke would be out for six to eight weeks with a knee injury, after leaving the pitch in their 1–1 draw with Manchester City. On 26 November, Madueke scored his first goal for Arsenal in a 3–1 Champions League win over Bayern Munich.

On 31 January 2026, Madueke recorded his first Premier League goal for the club in a 4–0 win against Leeds United. The goal was originally credited as a Karl Darlow own goal, before the Premier League goal accreditation panel credited Madueke with the goal. The goal came directly from a corner.

Madueke started the 2026–27 season primarily as a substitute.

== International career ==
=== Youth career ===
Madueke has represented England at youth level, scoring twice for the under-17 team in a qualifier against Denmark and was a squad member at the 2019 UEFA European Under-17 Championship.

Madueke made his U18 debut as a 70th minute substitute during the 3–2 win over Australia at De Montfort Park on 6 September 2019. He opened his goalscoring account for the U18s during a 2–0 win over South Korea at North Street on 10 September 2019.

On 15 March 2021, Madueke received his first England U21 call up as part of the Young Lions squad for the 2021 UEFA European Under-21 Championship and made his debut as a starter in the second group game, a 2–0 defeat to Portugal on 28 March 2021. He scored his first goal for the U21s in a 4–0 friendly win over France on 25 March 2023.

On 14 June 2023, Madueke was included in the England squad for the 2023 UEFA European Under-21 Championship. Featuring in all of his country's six games, Madueke helped England to win the tournament without conceding a single goal.

=== Senior career ===
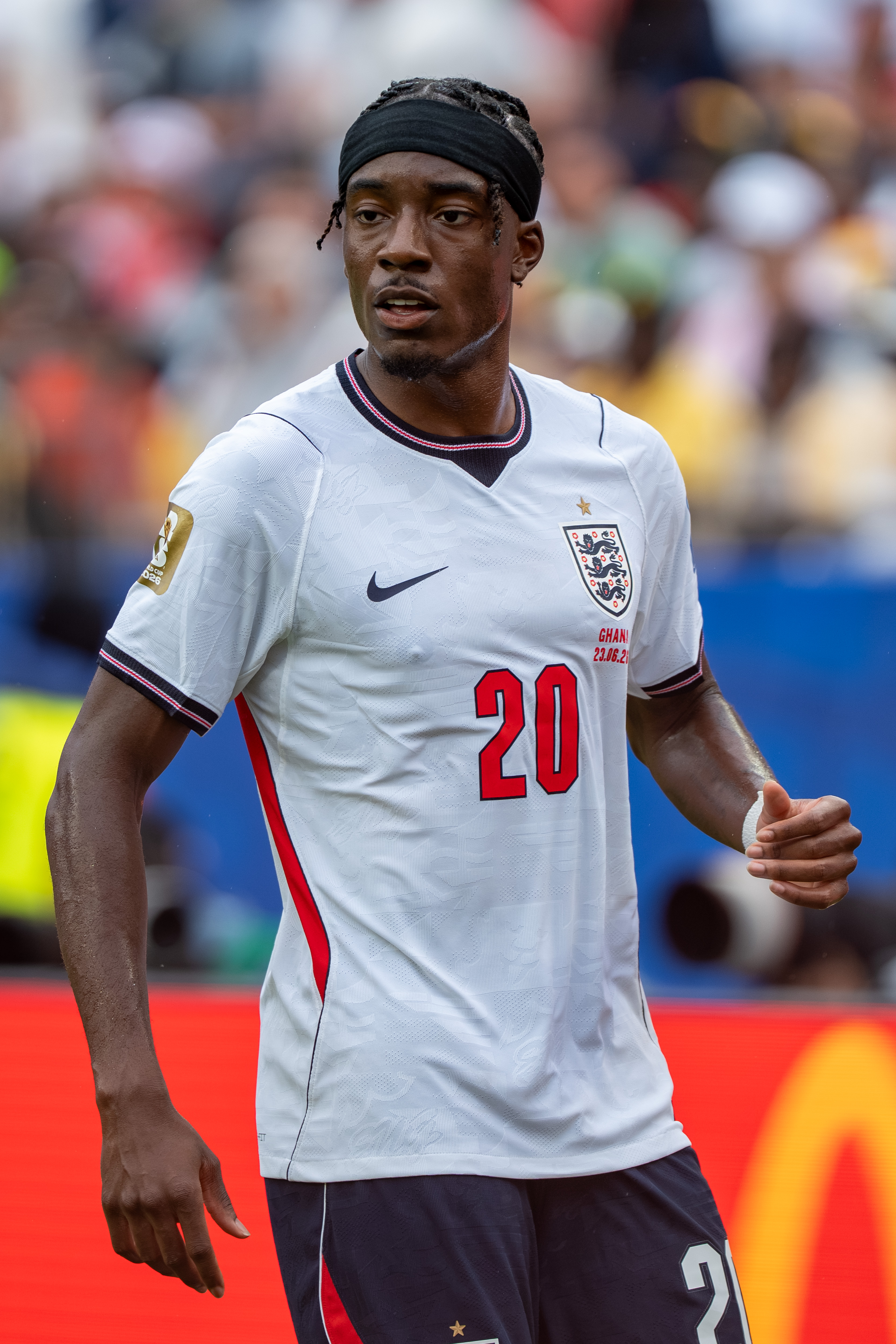
Madueke playing for England at the 2026 FIFA World Cup

On 29 August 2024, Madueke was called up to the senior squad for the first time for the UEFA Nations League matches against the Republic of Ireland and Finland. He debuted on 10 September 2024 against Finland at Wembley Stadium, coming on as a substitute for Bukayo Saka in the 66th minute, where he assisted on Harry Kane's second goal ten minutes later as England won 2–0.

On 14 November 2024, Madueke made his first start for England in a Nations League fixture against Greece, assisting Ollie Watkins' opening goal in the seventh minute of the 3–0 win. He scored his first senior international goal in a 5–0 win over Serbia during 2026 FIFA World Cup qualification on 9 September 2025.

On 22 May 2026, Madueke was selected in the 26-man squad for the 2026 FIFA World Cup.

== Style of play ==
Upon signing for PSV in June 2018, Madueke was described by the club as "a creative, physically strong left-footed midfielder". His manager at PSV, Roger Schmidt, stated that Madueke was "able to read situations, get to the right positions and be in the right place". The BBC described him as a "direct, powerful and versatile attacker" who was inspired by Cristiano Ronaldo. Madueke is known for his speed and dribbling ability.

== Career statistics ==
=== Club ===
As of match played 21 November 2026

Appearances and goals by club, season and competition
Club	Season	League			National cup (Note: Includes KNVB Cup, FA Cup)		League cup (Note: Includes EFL Cup)		Europe		Other		Total	
Club	Season	Division	Apps	Goals	Apps	Goals	Apps	Goals	Apps	Goals	Apps	Goals	Apps	Goals
Jong PSV	2019–20	Eerste Divisie	6	4	—		—		—		—		6	4
PSV Eindhoven	2019–20	Eredivisie	4	0	0	0	—		0	0	0	0	4	0
PSV Eindhoven	2020–21	Eredivisie	24	7	1	1	—		7 (Note: Appearances in UEFA Europa League)	1	—		32	9
PSV Eindhoven	2021–22	Eredivisie	18	3	2	1	—		14 (Note: Six appearances and two goals in UEFA Champions League, three appearances in UEFA Europa League, five appearances and one goal in UEFA Europa Conference League)	3	1 (Note: Appearance in Johan Cruyff Shield)	2	35	9
PSV Eindhoven	2022–23	Eredivisie	5	1	1	1	—		3	0	0	0	9	2
PSV Eindhoven	Total		51	11	4	3	0	0	24	4	1	2	80	20
Chelsea	2022–23	Premier League	12	1	—		—		0	0	—		12	1
Chelsea	2023–24	Premier League	23	5	6	1	5	2	—		—		34	8
Chelsea	2024–25	Premier League	32	7	1	0	1	0	7 (Note: Appearances in UEFA Conference League)	4	5 (Note: Appearances in FIFA Club World Cup)	0	46	11
Chelsea	Total		67	13	7	1	6	2	7	4	5	0	92	20
Arsenal	2025–26	Premier League	26	3	4	2	3	0	10 (Note: Appearances in UEFA Champions League)	3	—		43	8
Arsenal	2026–27	Premier League	8	2	0	0	1	1	4	1	1 (Note: Appearance in FA Community Shield)	0	14	4
Arsenal	Total		34	5	4	2	4	1	14	4	1	0	57	12
Career total			158	33	15	6	10	3	45	12	7	2	235	56

=== International ===
As of match played 11 July 2026

Appearances and goals by national team and year
National team	Year	Apps	Goals
England	2024	5	0
England	2025	4	1
England	2026	7	0
Total		16	1

As of match played 11 July 2026
England score listed first, score column indicates score after each Madueke goal.

List of international goals scored by Noni Madueke
No.	Date	Venue	Cap	Opponent	Score	Result	Competition	Ref.
1	9 September 2025	Red Star Stadium, Belgrade, Serbia	9	Serbia	2–0	5–0	2026 FIFA World Cup qualification	

== Honours ==
PSV Eindhoven

- KNVB Cup: 2021–22
- Johan Cruyff Shield: 2021

Chelsea

- UEFA Conference League: 2024–25
- FIFA Club World Cup: 2025
- EFL Cup runner-up: 2023–24

Arsenal

- Premier League: 2025–26
- FA Community Shield: 2026
- UEFA Champions League runner-up: 2025–26
- EFL Cup runner-up: 2025–26

England U21

- UEFA European Under-21 Championship: 2023

England

- FIFA World Cup third place: 2026
