= Harrison Murray-Campbell =

English footballer (born 2006)

Personal information
- Full name: Harrison Alexander Murray-Campbell
- Date of birth: 4 August 2006 (age 20)
- Place of birth: Bedfordshire, England
- Height: 1.89 m (6 ft 2 in)
- Position: Centre-back

Team information
- Current team: Kortrijk (on loan from Chelsea)
- Number: 4

Youth career
- 2014–2024: Chelsea

Senior career*
Years	Team	Apps	(Gls)
2024–	Chelsea	0	(0)
2026–	→ Kortrijk (loan)	8	(0)

International career^{‡}
2023	England U17	3	(1)
2023–2024	England U18	10	(0)
2024–	England U19	12	(0)
2025–	England U20	4	(0)
- * Club domestic league appearances and goals as of 1 November 2026 ‡ National team caps and goals as of 23:31, 31 March 2026 (UTC)

Harrison Alexander Murray-Campbell (born 4 August 2006) is an English professional footballer who plays as a centre-back or right-back for Belgian Pro League club Kortrijk, on loan from Premier League club Chelsea.

== Club career ==
Born in Bedfordshire, Murray-Campbell joined the academy of Chelsea at the under- 6 age group He signed his first professional contract in August 2023. Murray-Campbell had worn the captain's armband for Chelsea's under-21 side at the age of 16. He can play as a left or right side centre-back, full back and a wing-back.

On 12 December 2024, Murray-Campbell was named in the Chelsea first team squad in the UEFA Conference League game against Astana but remained an unused substitute. He then went on to make his debut against Shamrock Rovers on 19 December 2024.

On 10 July 2026, Murray-Campbell joined Belgian Pro League club Kortrijk on a season-long loan.

== International career ==
Murray-Campbell has represented England at under-17, under-18, under-19 and under-20 level.

On 2 November 2023, Murray-Campbell was included in the England squad for the 2023 FIFA U-17 World Cup where he played in three of the four games scoring one goal.

On 4 September 2024, Murray-Campbell made his England U19 debut as a substitute against Italy in Nedelišće. He also captained the team in the matches against Croatia and Germany in the following week. He was a member of England's squad at the 2025 UEFA European Under-19 Championship.

Murray-Campbell played for England U20s in September 2025 against Italy, where he again captained the team.

In October 2025, Murray-Campbell trained with the England senior team under Thomas Tuchel. He later captained the England U20s against Switzerland.

== Career statistics ==
=== Club ===
As of match played 26 August 2025

Appearances and goals by club, season and competition
Club	Season	League			FA Cup		EFL Cup		Europe		Other		Total	
Club	Season	Division	Apps	Goals	Apps	Goals	Apps	Goals	Apps	Goals	Apps	Goals	Apps	Goals
Chelsea U21	2023–24	—			—		—		—		1 (Note: Appearances in EFL Trophy)	0	1	0
Chelsea U21	2024–25	—			—		—		—		1	0	1	0
Chelsea U21	2025–26	—			—		—		—		1	0	1	0
Chelsea U21	Total		—		—		—		—		3	0	3	0
Chelsea	2024–25	Premier League	0	0	0	0	0	0	1 (Note: Appearances in UEFA Conference League)	0	0	0	1	0
Career total			0	0	0	0	0	0	1	0	3	0	4	0

== Honours ==
Chelsea U18

- U18 Premier League Southern Champion: 2023–24
- Chelsea U21 Premier League 2 Winner 2025/26

Chelsea

- UEFA Conference League: 2024–25

England U18

- 2024 U18 Pinatar Super Cup
- 2024 U18 Tri Nations
