= Roméo Lavia =

Belgian footballer (born 2004)

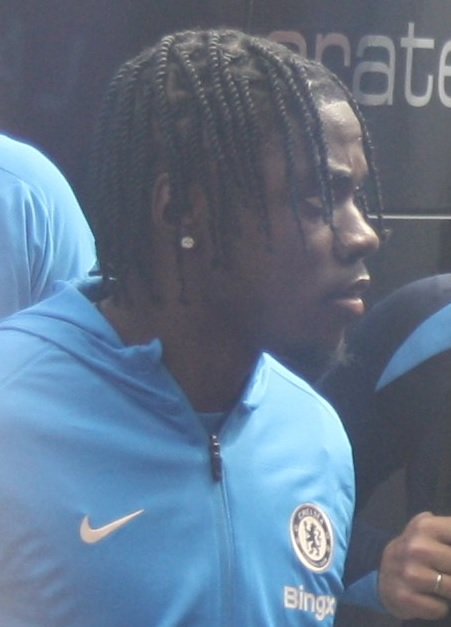
- Lavia in 2025 with Chelsea

Personal information
- Date of birth: 6 January 2004 (age 22)
- Place of birth: Brussels, Belgium
- Height: 1.81 m (5 ft 11 in)
- Position: Defensive midfielder

Team information
- Current team: Chelsea
- Number: 45

Youth career
- –2012: KV Woluwe-Zaventem
- 2012–2020: Anderlecht
- 2020–2021: Manchester City

Senior career*
Years	Team	Apps	(Gls)
2021–2022	Manchester City	0	(0)
2022–2023	Southampton	29	(1)
2023–	Chelsea	38	(1)

International career^{‡}
2019	Belgium U15	1	(0)
2019	Belgium U16	4	(2)
2021–2022	Belgium U19	10	(0)
2022	Belgium U21	1	(0)
2023–	Belgium	6	(0)
- * Club domestic league appearances and goals as of 17:37, 21 November 2026 (UTC) ‡ National team caps and goals as of 21:59, 15 November 2026 (UTC)

Roméo Lavia (born 6 January 2004) is a Belgian professional footballer who plays as a defensive midfielder for Premier League club Chelsea and the Belgium national team. Lavia is known for his interceptions, composure, press-resistance and physicality.

A product of Anderlecht's academy, he made his professional debut for Premier League side Manchester City in 2021, before being signed by Southampton in 2022. After Southampton's relegation in 2023, he was signed by Chelsea for £53 million.

A Belgium youth international, Lavia made his debut for the senior team in 2023.

== Club career ==
=== Anderlecht ===
Lavia is a youth product of the Belgian club Anderlecht. He arrived at eight years old at their training centre in Neerpede near Brussels.

At a local international youth tournament for players under the age of 15, he got noticed for the first time by Pep Guardiola. The Spanish trainer was there on invitation of his Manchester City player Kevin De Bruyne who is co-organiser of this tournament that also bears his name, the KDB Cup.

=== Manchester City ===
At the age of sixteen, Lavia left Anderlecht for Manchester City in the summer of 2020, and signed his first professional contract. He joined the U18s where he quickly stood out. In November that year, after only eleven appearances, Lavia was promoted to the U23 squad. Together with the EDS team, the Belgian youngster won the Premier League 2 championship in April 2021 and was voted player of the season.

From the summer of 2021, Lavia started training with the first-team. He earned a selection into squad of the Citizens to play the 2021–22 UEFA Champions League. Lavia made his professional debut at the age of seventeen on 21 September 2021, in the third round of the 2021–22 EFL Cup against Wycombe Wanderers, where he received a yellow card.

=== Southampton ===
On 6 July 2022, Lavia joined Southampton and signed a five-year contract. Although the fee was officially undisclosed, it was reported by BBC Sport to be worth an initial £10.5 million, plus £3.5 million in add-ons. It was also reported that the terms of the deal included a £40 million buy-back clause and a 20% sell-on clause for Manchester City.

On 6 August 2022, Lavia made his debut in a 4–1 loss away to Tottenham Hotspur. He scored his first goal on 30 August 2022 for the Saints in a 2–1 win over Chelsea becoming the first player born in 2004 to score in the Premier League. Southampton finished the season at the bottom of the Premier League table, resulting in relegation to the EFL Championship for the 2023–24 season. However, Lavia led all Premier League players under 21 years old in combined tackles, interceptions and blocked shots in the 2022–23 season. He was the only teenager in the top flight to have made more than 50 tackles, while his 7.8 ball recoveries per 90 minutes placed him in the top 15 players in the league.

=== Chelsea ===
On 18 August 2023, Lavia joined Chelsea, signing a seven-year contract, for a reported initial fee of £53 million plus add-ons. Lavia rejected an offer from Liverpool, as reportedly he felt the club "played with him" and didn't consider him a priority signing but rather "second choice". Before matching Chelsea's offer, Liverpool submitted three bids for the player, but they were rejected by Southampton as they didn't reach their valuation of the player.

Due to the protracted transfer saga, Lavia was lagging behind his teammates in terms of conditioning, as manager Mauricio Pochettino stated that the midfielder "needs a few weeks to be ready to be involved with the team". However, in early September, a muscle injury prevented Lavia making his debut for the new club. While recovering, he suffered another injury on his ankle which kept him sidelined for several weeks. Lavia made his Chelsea debut on 27 December 2023, coming on as a substitute during a 2–1 Premier League home win over Crystal Palace. Pochettino later confirmed that he injured his thigh during the match. On 27 March 2024, Chelsea confirmed that Lavia would miss the remainder of the season.

Lavia started his first game for Chelsea on 18 August 2024, in the opening match of the Premier League 2024–25 season against the reigning champions Manchester City. However, soon after, he was again struck by a hamstring injury, forcing him off the pitch for a month.

On 30 August 2026, he scored his first goal for the club in a 4–3 victory against Brighton in the league.

== International career ==
Lavia was born in Belgium to Congolese parents. In 2019, he played one official game for the Belgium U15 youth team, and also one for the Belgium U16 in which he scored once.

On 17 March 2023, he received his first call-up to the Belgian senior national team by manager Domenico Tedesco for the UEFA Euro 2024 qualifying match against Sweden and the friendly against Germany. On 28 March, Lavia made his debut for Belgium as a substitute in the 3–2 win against Germany.

== Style of play ==
Lavia is a defensive midfielder. According to Anderlecht's head of academy Jean Kindermans, Lavia's best position is a deep-lying playmaker, as "he can deliver passes and is always calm on the ball". Lavia stated that his inspirations are Barcelona player Sergio Busquets and his former Man City teammate Fernandinho.

Lavia visibly expresses himself to be comfortable when recovering the ball, making use of the intense pressing using intelligence, tenacity, along with pace, and when he makes line-breaking deep passes. He is also adept at driving forward with the ball once he regains possession, which makes him extremely effective on the counterattack. Lavia's dribbling ability enables him to break lines of defensive pressure, and he is also lauded for his awareness and reading of the game. Lavia is among the most accurate midfielders in the Premier League, with an accuracy-adjusted pass completion rate of 84% in the 2022–23 season, which had him tied for fifth best in his position. Former Southampton teammate Oriol Romeu, referring to Lavia, said that "if you’re that young and playing that well, you’re going to be special".

== Career statistics ==
=== Club ===
As of match played 21 November 2026

Appearances and goals by club, season and competition
Club	Season	League			FA Cup		EFL Cup		Europe		Other		Total	
Club	Season	Division	Apps	Goals	Apps	Goals	Apps	Goals	Apps	Goals	Apps	Goals	Apps	Goals
Manchester City U21	2020–21	—			—		—		—		2 (Note: Appearances in EFL Trophy)	0	2	0
Manchester City U21	2021–22	—			—		—		—		2	0	2	0
Manchester City U21	Total		—		—		—		—		4	0	4	0
Manchester City	2021–22	Premier League	0	0	1	0	1	0	0	0	0	0	2	0
Southampton	2022–23	Premier League	29	1	2	0	3	0	—		—		34	1
Chelsea	2023–24	Premier League	1	0	0	0	0	0	—		—		1	0
Chelsea	2024–25	Premier League	16	0	1	0	0	0	1 (Note: Appearance in UEFA Conference League)	0	4 (Note: Appearances in FIFA Club World Cup)	0	22	0
Chelsea	2025–26	Premier League	12	0	3	0	1	0	4 (Note: Appearances in UEFA Champions League)	0	—		20	0
Chelsea	2026–27	Premier League	9	1	0	0	2	0	—		—		11	1
Chelsea	Total		38	1	4	0	3	0	5	0	4	0	54	1
Career total			67	1	7	0	7	0	5	0	8	0	94	2

=== International ===
As of match played 15 November 2026

Appearances and goals by national team and year
National team	Year	Apps	Goals
Belgium	2023	1	0
Belgium	2024	0	0
Belgium	2025	0	0
Belgium	2026	5	0
Total		6	0

== Honours ==
Chelsea

- UEFA Conference League: 2024–25
- FIFA Club World Cup: 2025
- FA Cup runner-up: 2025–26

=== Individual ===
- Manchester City EDS Players' Player of the Year : 2020–21
