= Jan Paul van Hecke =

Dutch footballer (born 2000)

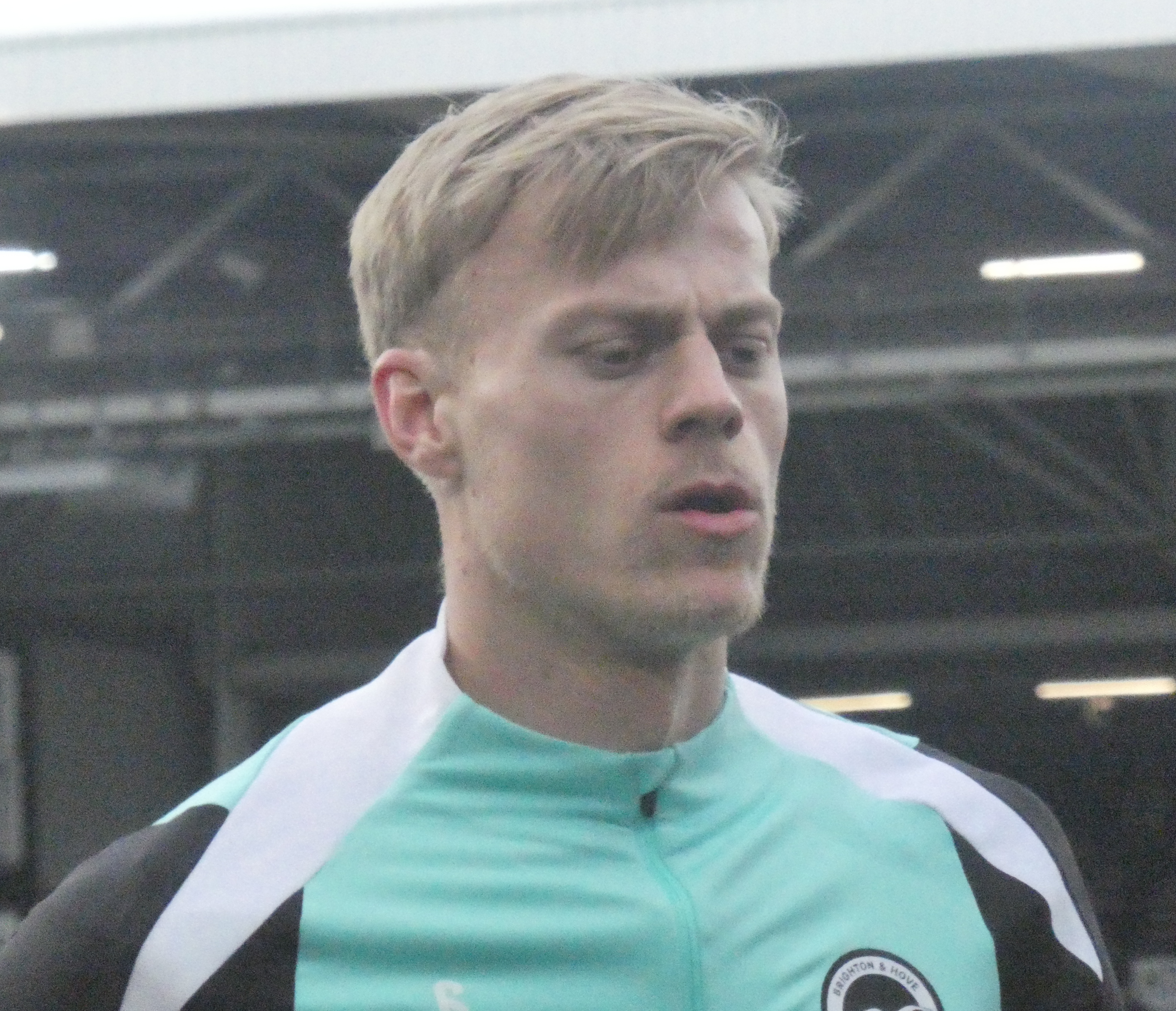
- Van Hecke with Brighton & Hove Albion in 2026

Personal information
- Full name: Jan Paul van Hecke
- Date of birth: 8 June 2000 (age 26)
- Place of birth: Arnemuiden, Netherlands
- Height: 1.89 m (6 ft 2 in)
- Position: Centre-back

Team information
- Current team: Tottenham Hotspur
- Number: 6

Youth career
- VV Arnemuiden
- 2017–2018: VV Goes
- 2018–2019: NAC

Senior career*
| Years | Team | Apps | (Gls) |
| 2019–2020 | NAC | 11 | (3) |
| 2020–2026 | Brighton & Hove Albion | 106 | (4) |
| 2020–2021 | → Heerenveen (loan) | 28 | (1) |
| 2021–2022 | → Blackburn Rovers (loan) | 31 | (1) |
| 2026– | Tottenham Hotspur | 9 | (2) |

International career^{‡}
| 2022–2023 | Netherlands U21 | 8 | (0) |
| 2024– | Netherlands | 20 | (1) |
- * Club domestic league appearances and goals as of 19:49, 4 November 2026 (UTC) ‡ National team caps and goals as of 16 November 2026

Jan Paul van Hecke (born 8 June 2000) is a Dutch professional footballer who plays as a centre-back for Premier League club Tottenham Hotspur and the Netherlands national team.

== Club career ==
=== Early career ===
Born in Arnemuiden, Van Hecke is a youth product of the local amateur side and of VV Goes, but signed for NAC Breda in 2018. He made his professional debut with NAC Breda in a 5–1 Eerste Divisie win over Helmond Sport on 16 August 2019.

=== Brighton & Hove Albion ===
On 10 September 2020, Van Hecke joined Premier League side Brighton & Hove Albion on a three-year contract.

==== Loan moves ====
On 18 September 2020, van Hecke returned to the Netherlands on a season-long loan with Eredivisie side Heerenveen. He made his debut for Heerenveen in a 3–1 Eredivisie away victory against Fortuna Sittard on 19 September 2020.

On 29 August 2021, van Hecke joined Blackburn Rovers of the Championship on loan for the 2021–22 season. He made his debut on 16 October, playing the whole match of the 2–2 home draw against Coventry City. He was sent off for a reckless challenge on Harry Wilson on his fifth appearance with Rovers already 2–0 down in an eventual 7–0 defeat at home to Fulham on 3 November. Van Hecke scored his first goal for Blackburn and in English football, doubling Rovers' lead with a powerful header in a 2–0 away victory against the second-place AFC Bournemouth on 11 December, closing the gap to four points to their promotion rivals. He was named as the club's Player of the Season for 2021–22, becoming the first loan player to achieve the accolade.

==== Breakthrough with Brighton ====
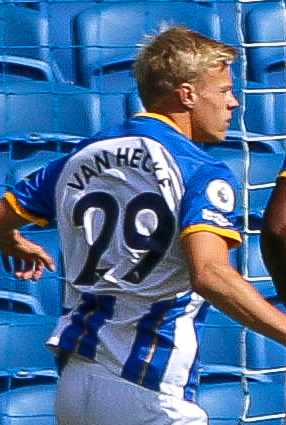
Van Hecke with Brighton & Hove Albion in 2022.

Van Hecke made his debut for Brighton on 24 August 2022, helping keep a clean sheet in the 3–0 away victory over League One side Forest Green Rovers in the EFL Cup second round. Three days later, he made his Premier League debut, coming on as a 88th-minute substitute for Danny Welbeck and helped secure Brighton's 1–0 lead over Leeds United to take all three points at Falmer Stadium. With the absence of Levi Colwill, Van Hecke was selected ahead of Adam Webster where he made his first Premier League start on 21 January 2023, in the 2–2 away draw at Leicester City. He played in the 1–1 home draw against champions Manchester City on 24 May, keeping Erling Haaland goalless with Brighton sealing a place in the 2023–24 UEFA Europa League.

On 13 July 2023, Van Hecke signed a new contract with the Seagulls; the length of the contract was undisclosed. In the 2023–24 season, he began to establish himself as a regular player of the starting XI, finishing the season with 28 Premier League appearances and five clean sheets. He was rewarded for his form with a new contract until 2027, with head coach Roberto De Zerbi praising Van Hecke for his performances, saying that he is "improving in an incredible way".

=== Tottenham Hotspur ===
On 18 June 2026, Van Hecke moved to fellow Premier League side Tottenham Hotspur on a long-term contract in a deal reportedly worth £52 million. He made his Spurs debut on 22 August in a 3–0 Premier League defeat to Brentford.

== International career ==
Van Hecke was called up to the Netherlands under-21 squad for the first time in March 2022, but was an unused substitute in a goalless UEFA European Under-21 Championship qualifying draw against Bulgaria. He debuted on 3 June, coming on as a substitute in the 3–0 away victory against Moldova under-21 in a 2023 European under-21 Championship qualifier.

On 16 August 2024, Van Hecke was named in the 35-man provisional Netherlands squad for the Nations League ties against Bosnia and Herzegovina and Germany alongside Brighton teammates Bart Verbruggen and Mats Wieffer. He was originally left out of the final squad, but received his first senior call-up on 1 September after the withdrawal of Micky van de Ven due to injury. On 10 September, Van Hecke debuted in a 2–2 UEFA Nations League draw against Germany at Johan Cruyff Arena, replacing Matthijs de Ligt at half-time of a 2–2 draw.

On 27 May 2026, Van Hecke was named in the Netherlands' squad for the 2026 FIFA World Cup. He scored his first international goal in a 3–1 victory over Tunisia during the World Cup group stage.

== Personal life ==
Van Hecke is the nephew of the Dutch retired footballer Jan Poortvliet.

== Career statistics ==
=== Club ===
As of match played 31 October 2026

Appearances and goals by club, season and competition
| Club | Season | League | | | National cup (Note: Includes KNVB Cup, FA Cup) | | League cup (Note: Includes EFL Cup) | | Europe | | Total | |
| Club | Season | Division | Apps | Goals | Apps | Goals | Apps | Goals | Apps | Goals | Apps | Goals |
|---|---|---|---|---|---|---|---|---|---|---|---|---|
| NAC Breda | 2019–20 | Eerste Divisie | 11 | 3 | 5 | 1 | — | | — | | 16 | 4 |
| Brighton & Hove Albion | 2020–21 | Premier League | 0 | 0 | — | | 0 | 0 | — | | 0 | 0 |
| Brighton & Hove Albion | 2021–22 | Premier League | 0 | 0 | — | | 0 | 0 | — | | 0 | 0 |
| Brighton & Hove Albion | 2022–23 | Premier League | 8 | 0 | 4 | 0 | 1 | 0 | — | | 13 | 0 |
| Brighton & Hove Albion | 2023–24 | Premier League | 28 | 0 | 3 | 0 | 1 | 0 | 7 (Note: Appearances in UEFA Europa League) | 0 | 39 | 0 |
| Brighton & Hove Albion | 2024–25 | Premier League | 34 | 1 | 4 | 0 | 1 | 0 | — | | 39 | 1 |
| Brighton & Hove Albion | 2025–26 | Premier League | 36 | 3 | 2 | 0 | 2 | 0 | — | | 40 | 3 |
| Brighton & Hove Albion | Total | | 106 | 4 | 13 | 0 | 5 | 0 | 7 | 0 | 131 | 4 |
| SC Heerenveen (loan) | 2020–21 | Eredivisie | 28 | 1 | 1 | 0 | — | | — | | 29 | 1 |
| Blackburn Rovers (loan) | 2021–22 | Championship | 31 | 1 | 1 | 0 | — | | — | | 32 | 1 |
| Tottenham Hotspur | 2026–27 | Premier League | 9 | 2 | 0 | 0 | 1 | 0 | — | | 10 | 2 |
| Career total | | | 185 | 11 | 20 | 1 | 6 | 0 | 7 | 0 | 218 | 12 |

=== International ===
As of match played 16 November 2026

Appearances and goals by national team and year
| National team | Year | Apps | Goals |
|---|---|---|---|
| Netherlands | 2024 | 2 | 0 |
| Netherlands | 2025 | 6 | 0 |
| Netherlands | 2026 | 12 | 1 |
| Total | | 20 | 1 |

Netherlands score listed first, score column indicates score after each van Hecke goal.

List of international goals scored by Jan Paul van Hecke
| No. | Date | Venue | Cap | Opponent | Score | Result | Competition |
|---|---|---|---|---|---|---|---|
| 1 | 25 June 2026 | Arrowhead Stadium, Kansas City, United States | 15 | Tunisia | 3–1 | 3–1 | 2026 FIFA World Cup |

== Honours ==
Individual

- Blackburn Rovers Player of the Season: 2021–22
- Brighton & Hove Albion Player of the Year: 2024–25
