= 2024–25 Brighton & Hove Albion F.C. season =

123rd season in existence of Brighton & Hove Albion FC

Brighton & Hove Albion F.C.
2024–25 season
- Chairman: Tony Bloom
- Head coach: Fabian Hürzeler
- Stadium: Falmer Stadium
- Premier League: 8th
- FA Cup: Quarter-finals
- EFL Cup: Fourth round
- Top goalscorer: League: Kaoru Mitoma; João Pedro; Danny Welbeck (10 each); All: Kaoru Mitoma; Danny Welbeck (11 each)
- Highest home attendance: 31,840 vs Wolverhampton Wanderers (Premier League – 26 October 2024)
- Lowest home attendance: 16,018 vs Wolverhampton Wanderers (EFL Cup – 18 September 2024)
- Average home league attendance: 31,482
- Biggest win: 4–0 vs Crawley Town (EFL Cup – 27 August 2024); 4–0 vs Norwich City (FA Cup – 11 January 2025); 4–0 vs Southampton (Premier League – 22 February 2025)
- Biggest defeat: 0–7 vs Nottingham Forest (Premier League – 1 February 2025)
Home colours	Away colours	Third colours

The 2024–25 season was the 123rd season in the history of Brighton & Hove Albion, and their eighth consecutive season in the Premier League. In addition to the domestic league, the club participated in the FA Cup and the EFL Cup.

== Players ==
As of 2 April 2025

No.	Player	Position	Nationality	Place of birth	Date of birth (age)	Signed from	Date signed	Fee	Contract end
Goalkeepers
1	Bart Verbruggen	GK	(Netherlands)	Breda	18 August 2002 (age 24)	(Belgium) Anderlecht	3 July 2023	£16,300,000	30 June 2028
23	Jason Steele	GK	(England)	Newton Aycliffe	18 August 1990 (age 36)	Sunderland	1 July 2018	Free transfer	30 June 2026
39	Carl Rushworth	GK	(England)	Halifax	2 July 2001 (age 25)	FC Halifax Town	2019	—N/a	—N/a
Defenders
2	Tariq Lamptey	RB	(Ghana)	Hillingdon	30 September 2000 (age 26)	Chelsea	31 January 2020	£1,200,000	30 June 2025
3	Igor Julio	CB	(Brazil)	Bom Sucesso	7 February 1998 (age 28)	(Italy) Fiorentina	26 July 2023	£15,000,000	30 June 2027
4	Adam Webster	CB	(England)	Chichester	4 January 1995 (age 31)	Bristol City	3 August 2019	£22,220,000	30 June 2026
5	Lewis Dunk	CB	(England)	Brighton	21 November 1991 (age 34)	Academy	1 July 2010	—N/a	30 June 2026
16	Eiran Cashin	CB	(Republic of Ireland)	Mansfield	9 November 2001 (age 25)	Derby County	31 January 2025	£9,000,000	30 June 2030
24	Ferdi Kadıoğlu	LB	(Turkey)	Arnhem	7 October 1999 (age 27)	(Turkey) Fenerbahçe	27 August 2024	£25,000,000	30 June 2028
29	Jan Paul van Hecke	CB	(Netherlands)	Arnemuiden	8 June 2000 (age 26)	(Netherlands) NAC Breda	10 September 2020	£1,500,000	30 June 2027
30	Pervis Estupiñán	LB	(Ecuador)	Esmeraldas	21 January 1998 (age 28)	(Spain) Villarreal	16 August 2022	£17,800,000	30 June 2027
34	Joël Veltman	RB	(Netherlands)	IJmuiden	15 January 1992 (age 34)	(Netherlands) Ajax	29 July 2020	£900,000	30 June 2026
Midfielders
6	James Milner	CM	(England)	Leeds	4 January 1986 (age 40)	Liverpool	1 July 2023	Free transfer	30 June 2025
7	Solly March	RW	(England)	Eastbourne	20 July 1994 (age 32)	Lewes	1 November 2011	£5,000	30 June 2026
8	Brajan Gruda	AM	(Germany)	Speyer	31 May 2004 (age 22)	(Germany) Mainz 05	14 August 2024	£25,000,000	30 June 2028
11	Simon Adingra	LW	(Ivory Coast)	Yamoussoukro	1 January 2002 (age 24)	(Denmark) Nordsjælland	1 July 2022	£8,000,000	30 June 2026
17	Yankuba Minteh	RW	(The Gambia)	Bakoteh	22 July 2004 (age 22)	Newcastle United	1 July 2024	£30,000,000	30 June 2029
20	Carlos Baleba	CM	(Cameroon)	Douala	3 January 2004 (age 22)	(France) Lille	29 August 2023	£23,200,000	30 June 2028
22	Kaoru Mitoma	LW	(Japan)	Hita	20 May 1997 (age 29)	(Japan) Kawasaki Frontale	10 August 2021	£3,000,000	30 June 2027
25	Diego Gómez	CM	(Paraguay)	San Juan Bautista	27 March 2003 (age 23)	(United States) Inter Miami CF	1 January 2025	£11,000,000	30 June 2030
26	Yasin Ayari	CM	(Sweden)	Solna	6 October 2003 (age 23)	(Sweden) AIK	30 January 2023	£4,000,000	30 June 2027
27	Mats Wieffer	CM	(Netherlands)	Borne	16 November 1999 (age 27)	(Netherlands) Feyenoord	5 July 2024	£25,600,000	30 June 2029
33	Matt O'Riley	CM	(Denmark)	Hounslow	21 November 2000 (age 25)	(Scotland) Celtic	26 August 2024	£25,000,000	30 June 2029
41	Jack Hinshelwood	CM	(England)	Worthing	11 April 2005 (age 21)	Academy	1 July 2012	—N/a	30 June 2028
Forwards
9	João Pedro	CF	(Brazil)	Ribeirão Preto	26 September 2001 (age 25)	Watford	1 July 2023	£34,200,000	30 June 2028
14	Georginio Rutter	CF	(France)	Plescop	20 April 2002 (age 24)	Leeds United	19 August 2024	£40,000,000	30 June 2029
18	Danny Welbeck	CF	(England)	Manchester	26 November 1990 (age 35)	Watford	18 October 2020	Free transfer	30 June 2026

== Transfers ==
=== In ===
Date	Position	Player	From	Fee	Team	Ref.
14 June 2024 (Note: Transfer was announced on 10 February, but was made official on 14 June.)	LW	(Ghana) Ibrahim Osman	(Denmark) Nordsjælland	Undisclosed	First team	
1 July 2024	RW	(The Gambia) Yankuba Minteh	(England) Newcastle United	£30,000,000	First team	
5 July 2024	DM	(Netherlands) Mats Wieffer	(Netherlands) Feyenoord	£25,400,000	First team	
7 July 2024	AM	(England) Amario Cozier-Duberry	(England) Arsenal	Free transfer	Under-21s	
12 July 2024	CM	(Ivory Coast) Malick Yalcouyé	(Sweden) IFK Göteborg	£6,000,000	Under-21s	
14 August 2024	AM	(Germany) Brajan Gruda	(Germany) Mainz 05	£25,000,000	First team	
19 August 2024	CF	(France) Georginio Rutter	(England) Leeds United	£40,000,000	First team	
26 August 2024	CM	(Denmark) Matt O'Riley	(Scotland) Celtic	£25,000,000	First team	
27 August 2024	LB	(Turkey) Ferdi Kadıoğlu	(Turkey) Fenerbahçe	£25,000,000	First team	
1 January 2025 (Note: Transfer was announced on 10 December, before becoming official on 1 January, the opening day of the Winter transfer window.)	CM	(Paraguay) Diego Gómez	(United States) Inter Miami	£11,000,000	First team	
19 December 2024	GK	(England) Charlie Wilson-Papps	(England) AFC Wimbledon	Undisclosed	Under-18s	
7 January 2025	GK	(England) Sebastian Jensen	(England) Stoke City	Free	Under-21s	
31 January 2025	CB	(Republic of Ireland) Eiran Cashin	(England) Derby County	Undisclosed	First team	
3 February 2025	CF	(Greece) Stefanos Tzimas	(Germany) 1. FC Nürnberg	Undisclosed	First team	

=== Out ===
Date	Position	Player	To	Fee	Team	Ref.
19 July 2024	CM	(Poland) Kacper Kozłowski	(Turkey) Gaziantep	Undisclosed	First team	
25 July 2024	CM	(Scotland) Marc Leonard	(England) Birmingham City	Undisclosed	Under-21s	
1 August 2024	CM	(Germany) Pascal Groß	(Germany) Borussia Dortmund	Undisclosed	First team	
9 August 2024	FW	(Germany) Deniz Undav	(Germany) VfB Stuttgart	Undisclosed	First team	
29 August 2024	CM	(England) Jensen Weir	(England) Wigan Athletic	Undisclosed	Under-21s	
30 August 2024	CM	(Syria) Mahmoud Dahoud	(Germany) Eintracht Frankfurt	Free transfer	First team	
30 August 2024	CM	(Scotland) Billy Gilmour	(Italy) Napoli	Undisclosed	First team	
13 January 2025	LB	(England) Imari Samuels	(Scotland) Dundee	Undisclosed	Under-21s	
20 January 2025	CM	(Poland) Jakub Moder	(Netherlands) Feyenoord	Undisclosed	First team	
31 January 2025	AM	(Australia) Cameron Peupion	(Netherlands) ADO Den Haag	Undisclosed	Under-21s	
3 February 2025	RW	(England) Benicio Baker-Boaitey	(England) Millwall	Free transfer	Under-21s	
3 February 2025	FW	(England) Marcus Ifill	(England) Bromley	Free transfer	Under-21s	
3 February 2025	CB	(Northern Ireland) Ruairi McConville	(England) Norwich City	Undisclosed	Under-21s	
3 February 2025	CB	(Wales) Ed Turns	(England) Exeter City	Undisclosed	Under-21s	

=== Loaned out ===
Date	Pos.	Player	To	Date until	Team	Ref.
2 July 2024	GK	(Netherlands) Kjell Scherpen	(Austria) Sturm Graz	End of season	First team	
4 July 2024	GK	(England) James Beadle	(England) Sheffield Wednesday	End of season	Under-21s	
8 July 2024	CB	(England) Ben Jackson	(Scotland) Livingston	18 January 2025 (Note: On 18 January 2025, Jackson was recalled from his season-long loan at Livingston and subsequently was loaned to Queen's Park)	Under-21s	
24 July 2024	GK	(Canada) Tom McGill	(England) Milton Keynes Dons	3 February 2025 (Note: On 3 February, McGill was recalled back from his season-long loan at MK Dons)	First team	
6 August 2024	LW	(England) Luca Barrington	(England) Grimsby Town	End of season	Under-21s	
7 August 2024	RW	(England) Benicio Baker-Boaitey	(England) Port Vale	8 January 2025	Under-21s	
10 August 2024	AM	(Argentina) Facundo Buonanotte	(England) Leicester City	End of season	First team	
12 August 2024	DF	(Sweden) Casper Nilsson	(Scotland) Partick Thistle	3 February 2025	Under-21s	
15 August 2024	LW	(Ghana) Ibrahim Osman	(Netherlands) Feyenoord	End of season	First team	
16 August 2024	AM	(England) Kamari Doyle	(England) Exeter City	27 January 2025 (Note: On 27 January, Doyle was recalled back from his loan at Exeter and subsequently joined Crawley on loan)	Under-21s	
16 August 2024	AM	(Republic of Ireland) Andrew Moran	(England) Stoke City	End of season	Under-21s	
19 August 2024	MF	(Tunisia) Samy Chouchane	(England) Northampton Town	End of season	Under-21s	
21 August 2024	RW	(Senegal) Abdallah Sima	(France) Brest	End of season	First team	
23 August 2024	LB	(Argentina) Valentín Barco	(Spain) Sevilla	2 February 2025 (Note: On 2 February, Barco was recalled back from his loan at Sevilla and subsequently joined Strasbourg on loan)	First team	
28 August 2024	CF	(Republic of Ireland) Mark O'Mahony	(England) Portsmouth	End of season	Under-21s	
29 August 2024	CM	(Ivory Coast) Malick Yalcouyé	(Austria) Sturm Graz	End of season	Under-21s	
30 August 2024	RW	(England) Amario Cozier-Duberry	(England) Blackburn Rovers	End of season	Under-21s	
30 August 2024	RB	(England) Odeluga Offiah	(England) Blackpool	End of season	Under-21s	
30 August 2024	GK	(England) Carl Rushworth	(England) Hull City	22 January 2025 (Note: On 22 January, Rushworth was recalled back from his loan at Hull)	First team	
30 August 2024	AM	(Ecuador) Jeremy Sarmiento	(England) Burnley	End of season	First team	
13 January 2025	FW	(England) Louis Flower	(England) Gateshead	End of season	Under-21s	
18 January 2025	CB	(England) Ben Jackson	(Scotland) Queen's Park	End of season	Under-21s	
23 January 2025	CF	(Paraguay) Julio Enciso	(England) Ipswich Town	End of season	First team	
27 January 2025	AM	(England) Kamari Doyle	(England) Crawley Town	End of season	Under-21s	
2 February 2025	LB	(Argentina) Valentín Barco	(France) Strasbourg	End of Season	First team	
3 February 2025	CF	(Republic of Ireland) Evan Ferguson	(England) West Ham United	End of season	First team	
3 February 2025	CF	(Greece) Stefanos Tzimas	(Germany) 1. FC Nürnberg	End of Season	First team	
3 February 2025	AM	(England) Caylan Vickers	(England) Mansfield Town	End of Season	Under-21s	

=== Released / Out of contract ===
Date	Position	Player	Team	Subsequent club	Join date	Ref.
30 June 2024	AM	(England) Adam Lallana	First team	(England) Southampton	1 July 2024	
30 June 2024	RW	(England) Brody Peart	Under-21s	(England) Wycombe Wanderers	1 July 2024	
30 June 2024	DF	(Republic of Ireland) Leigh Kavanagh	Under-21s	(Republic of Ireland) Bohemians	1 July 2024	
30 June 2024	MF	(Wales) Jaydon Fuller	Under-18s	(United States) University of Delaware	22 July 2024	
30 June 2024	MF	(England) Jack Hinchy	Under-21s	(England) Notts County	26 July 2024	
30 June 2024	CM	(Colombia) Steven Alzate	First team	(England) Hull City	9 September 2024	
30 June 2024	GK	(England) Tommy Reid	Under-21s	(England) Charlton Athletic	17 September 2024	
30 June 2024	MF	(England) Bailey Smith	Under-21s	(England) Worthing	19 December 2024	
3 February 2025	RB	(Sweden) Casper Nilsson	Under-21s	(Sweden) Ängelholms FF	12 March 2025	

== Pre-season and friendlies ==
On 23 May 2024, Albion announced a pre-season trip to Japan for two friendly matches against Kashima Antlers and Tokyo Verdy. Five days later, a third friendly was added against Queens Park Rangers. On 8 July, a home friendly versus Villarreal was added.

Win Draw Loss Fixtures

17 July 2024 Friendly	Brighton & Hove Albion	3–0	Sheffield Wednesday
		Report		Attendance: 0 (Behind closed doors)

24 July 2024 Friendly	Kashima Antlers	1–5	Brighton & Hove Albion	Tokyo, Japan
19:00 JST (11:00 BST)	Tokuda 84'	Report	Minteh 15'; Samuels (yellow card) 27'; Sarmiento 51'; Ayari 54'; Cozier-Duberry 63', 74'	Stadium: Japan National Stadium; Attendance: 25,172; Referee: Hayato Shimizu (Japan)

28 July 2024 Friendly	Tokyo Verdy	2–4	Brighton & Hove Albion	Tokyo, Japan
18:30 JST (10:30 BST)	Kimura 15'; Hayashi 54'	Report	Van Hecke 11'; Minteh 44'; Adingra 49'; Sarmiento 77'	Stadium: Japan National Stadium; Attendance: 25,851; Referee: Atsushi Kamimura (Japan)

3 August 2024 Friendly	Queens Park Rangers	0–1	Brighton & Hove Albion	White City
15:00 BST		Report	Milner (yellow card) 29'; Welbeck 53' (pen.)	Stadium: Loftus Road; Referee: James Linington

10 August 2024 Friendly	Brighton & Hove Albion	4–0	Villarreal	Falmer
15:00 BST	João Pedro 15'; Welbeck 40', 85' (pen.); Minteh 70'	Report		Stadium: Falmer Stadium; Attendance: 11,527; Referee: Steve Martin (England)

== Competitions ==
=== Overall record ===
Competition	First match	Last match	Starting round	Final position	Record							
Competition	First match	Last match	Starting round	Final position	Pld	W	D	L	GF	GA	GD	Win %
Premier League	17 August 2024	25 May 2025	Matchday 1	8th	38	16	13	9	66	59	+7	42.11
FA Cup	11 January 2025	29 March 2025	Third round	Quarter-finals	4	3	1	0	8	2	+6	75.00
EFL Cup	27 August 2024	30 October 2024	Second round	Fourth round	3	2	0	1	9	5	+4	66.67
Total					45	21	14	10	83	66	+17	46.67

Source: Soccerway

=== Premier League ===
==== League table ====
Pos	Team	Pld	W	D	L	GF	GA	GD	Pts	Qualification or relegation
6	Aston Villa	38	19	9	10	58	51	+7	66	Qualification for the Europa League league phase (Note: Initially, Crystal Palace qualified for the Europa League league phase as the 2024–25 FA Cup winners. However, due to multi-club ownership rules, they were not permitted to enter the Europa League and entered the Conference League play-off round instead, with 7th-placed Nottingham Forest taking their place in the Europa League. Crystal Palace appealed the decision but this was ultimately rejected.)
7	Nottingham Forest	38	19	8	11	58	46	+12	65	Qualification for the Europa League league phase
8	Brighton & Hove Albion	38	16	13	9	66	59	+7	61	
9	Bournemouth	38	15	11	12	58	46	+12	56	
10	Brentford	38	16	8	14	66	57	+9	56	

Source: Premier League
Rules for classification: 1) Points; 2) Goal difference; 3) Goals scored; 4) If the champions, relegated teams or qualified teams for UEFA competitions cannot be determined by rules 1 to 3, rules 4.1 to 4.3 are applied – 4.1) Points gained in head-to-head record between such teams; 4.2) Away goals scored in head-to-head record between such teams; 4.3) Play-offs

==== Results summary ====
Overall								Home						Away					
Pld	W	D	L	GF	GA	GD	Pts	W	D	L	GF	GA	GD	W	D	L	GF	GA	GD
38	16	13	9	66	59	+7	61	8	8	3	30	26	+4	8	5	6	36	33	+3

Source: Soccerway

==== Results by round ====
Round	1	2	3	4	5	6	7	8	9	10	11	12	13	14	15	16	17	18	19	20	21	22	23	24	25	26	27	28	29	30	31	32	33	34	35	36	37	38
Ground	A	H	A	H	H	A	H	A	H	A	H	A	H	A	A	H	A	H	A	H	A	A	H	A	H	A	H	H	A	H	A	H	A	H	H	A	H	A
Result	W	W	D	D	D	L	W	W	D	L	W	W	D	L	D	L	D	D	D	D	W	W	L	L	W	W	W	W	D	L	L	D	L	W	D	W	W	W
Position	1	2	3	6	7	9	6	5	6	8	6	5	4	5	7	9	10	10	10	10	9	9	9	10	10	9	8	7	7	8	9	10	10	9	10	9	8	8
Points	3	6	7	8	9	9	12	15	16	16	19	22	23	23	24	24	25	26	27	28	31	34	34	34	37	40	43	46	47	47	47	48	48	51	52	55	58	61

Source: Soccerway
A = Away; H = Home; W = Win; D = Draw; L = Loss; P = Postponed

==== Matches ====
On 18 June 2024, the Premier League fixtures were released.

Win Draw Loss Fixtures

17 August 2024 1	Everton	0–3	Brighton & Hove Albion	Liverpool
15:00 BST	Young (red card) 66'; Tarkowski (yellow card) 77'	Report	Mitoma 25'; Milner (yellow card) 31'; Welbeck 56'; Adingra 87'	Stadium: Goodison Park; Attendance: 39,217; Referee: Simon Hooper

24 August 2024 2	Brighton & Hove Albion	2–1	Manchester United	Falmer
12:30 BST	Welbeck 32'; Van Hecke (yellow card) 89'; João Pedro 90+5'	Report	Amad 60', (yellow card) 76'; Mainoo (yellow card) 78'	Stadium: Falmer Stadium; Attendance: 31,537; Referee: Craig Pawson

31 August 2024 3	Arsenal	1–1	Brighton & Hove Albion	Holloway
12:30 BST	Havertz 38'; Rice (yellow card) 42' (yellow-red card) 49'; Partey (yellow card) 45+3'; Timber (yellow card) 70'; Raya (yellow card) 90+4'	Report	João Pedro 58', (yellow card) 90+6'; Minteh (yellow card) 70'	Stadium: Emirates Stadium; Attendance: 60,326; Referee: Chris Kavanagh

14 September 2024 4	Brighton & Hove Albion	0–0	Ipswich Town	Falmer
15:00 BST	Minteh (yellow card) 47'; Hinshelwood (yellow card) 60'; Veltman (yellow card) 85'; Verbruggen (yellow card) 90+4'	Report	Morsy (yellow card) 7'; Phillips (yellow card) 51'; Hutchinson (yellow card) 57'	Stadium: Falmer Stadium; Attendance: 31,573; Referee: Sam Barrott

22 September 2024 5	Brighton & Hove Albion	2–2	Nottingham Forest	Falmer
14:00 BST	Baleba (yellow card) 25'; Welbeck (yellow card) 39', (goal) 45'; Hinshelwood 42'; Dunk (yellow card) 90+4'	Report	Wood 13' (pen.); Aina (yellow card) 44'; Williams (yellow card) 46'; Gibbs-White (yellow card) 60' (yellow-red card) 83'; Silva (yellow card) 64'; Sosa 70'; Hudson-Odoi (yellow card) 90+3'	Stadium: Falmer Stadium; Attendance: 31,444; Referee: Robert Jones
Note: In the 83rd minute, both managers were also shown a red card.

28 September 2024 6	Chelsea	4–2	Brighton & Hove Albion	Fulham
15:00 BST	Palmer 21', 28' (pen.), 31', 41'; Fernández (yellow card) 29'; Cucurella (yellow card) 33'; Fofana (yellow card) 78'	Report	Rutter 7'; Dunk (yellow card) 27'; Estupiñán (yellow card) 29'; Baleba 34'	Stadium: Stamford Bridge; Attendance: 39,495; Referee: Peter Bankes

6 October 2024 7	Brighton & Hove Albion	3–2	Tottenham Hotspur	Falmer
16:30 BST	Igor (yellow card) 34'; Minteh 48'; Rutter 58'; Welbeck 66'; Verbruggen (yellow card) 80'	Report	Johnson 23'; Maddison 37'; Udogie (yellow card) 67'; Kulusevski (yellow card) 69'	Stadium: Falmer Stadium; Attendance: 31,487; Referee: David Coote
Note: Fixture was initially scheduled for 5 October, but was moved for live Sky Sports broadcast.

19 October 2024 8	Newcastle United	0–1	Brighton & Hove Albion	Newcastle upon Tyne
15:00 BST	Burn (yellow card) 10'; Hall (yellow card) 37'	Report	Welbeck 35'; Ayari (yellow card) 45'; Hinshelwood (yellow card) 71'	Stadium: St James' Park; Attendance: 52,220; Referee: Peter Bankes

26 October 2024 9	Brighton & Hove Albion	2–2	Wolverhampton Wanderers	Falmer
15:00 BST	Welbeck 45'; Rutter (yellow card) 56'; Igor (yellow card) 70'; Estupiñán (yellow card) 74'; Ferguson 85'	Report	Toti (yellow card) 41'; Larsen (yellow card) 45+3'; Aït-Nouri (yellow card) 50', (goal) 88'; Cunha 90+3'	Stadium: Falmer Stadium; Attendance: 31,840; Referee: Michael Oliver

2 November 2024 10	Liverpool	2–1	Brighton & Hove Albion	Liverpool
15:00 GMT	Mac Allister (yellow card) 45'; Gakpo 69'; Salah 72'	Report	Kadıoğlu 14', (yellow card) 83'	Stadium: Anfield; Attendance: 60,331; Referee: Tony Harrington

9 November 2024 11	Brighton & Hove Albion	2–1	Manchester City	Falmer
17:30 GMT	Ayari (yellow card) 19'; Igor (yellow card) 44'; João Pedro 78'; O'Riley 83'; Van Hecke (yellow card) 90+10'	Report	Haaland 23', (yellow card) 90+10'; Lewis (yellow card) 37'; Simpson-Pusey (yellow card) 77'	Stadium: Falmer Stadium; Attendance: 31,715; Referee: Sam Barrott
Note: Fixture was initially scheduled for a 15:00 kick-off, but was moved for live Sky Sports broadcast.

23 November 2024 12	Bournemouth	1–2	Brighton & Hove Albion	Bournemouth
15:00 GMT	Semenyo (yellow card) 40'; Brooks 90+3'; Cook (yellow card) 90+6'	Report	João Pedro 4'; Rutter (yellow card) 30'; Baleba (yellow card) 45+1' (yellow-red card) 59'; Mitoma 49'; Van Hecke (yellow card) 90+6'	Stadium: Dean Court; Attendance: 11,196; Referee: Stuart Attwell

29 November 2024 13	Brighton & Hove Albion	1–1	Southampton	Falmer
20:00 GMT	O'Riley (yellow card) 16'; Mitoma 29'; Wieffer (yellow card) 90+7'	Report	Downes (yellow card) 12', (goal) 59'; Walker-Peters (yellow card) 31'; Harwood-Bellis (yellow card) 55'; Dibling (yellow card) 90+12'	Stadium: Falmer Stadium; Attendance: 31,542; Referee: Robert Jones
Note: Fixture was initially scheduled for 30 November, but was moved for live Sky Sports broadcast.

5 December 2024 14	Fulham	3–1	Brighton & Hove Albion	Fulham
19:30 GMT	Iwobi 4', 87'; Berge (yellow card) 32'; O'Riley 79' (o.g.); Pereira (yellow card) 90+3'	Report	Baleba 56'; Van Hecke (yellow card) 63'; Dunk (yellow card) 79'	Stadium: Craven Cottage; Attendance: 26,368; Referee: Peter Bankes

8 December 2024 15	Leicester City	2–2	Brighton & Hove Albion	Leicester
14:00 GMT	Vardy 86'; Soumaré (yellow card) 87'; De Cordova-Reid 90+1'	Report	Lamptey 37'; Baleba (yellow card) 41'; Wieffer (yellow card) 74'; Minteh 79'	Stadium: King Power Stadium; Attendance: 31,647; Referee: Stuart Attwell

15 December 2024 16	Brighton & Hove Albion	1–3	Crystal Palace	Falmer
14:00 GMT	Dunk (yellow card) 45+1'; Guéhi 87' (o.g.)	Report	Chalobah 27'; Sarr 33', 82', (yellow card) 79'; Guéhi (yellow card) 45+4'; Muñoz (yellow card) 51'; Henderson (yellow card) 69'	Stadium: Falmer Stadium; Attendance: 30,893; Referee: Michael Oliver

21 December 2024 17	West Ham United	1–1	Brighton & Hove Albion	Stratford
15:00 GMT	Paquetá (yellow card) 17'; Mavropanos (yellow card) 35'; Kudus 58'	Report	Veltman (yellow card) 45+3'; Wieffer 51'; Estupiñán (yellow card) 84'	Stadium: London Stadium; Attendance: 62,460; Referee: Robert Jones

27 December 2024 18	Brighton & Hove Albion	0–0	Brentford	Falmer
19:30 GMT		Report	Mee (yellow card) 57'; Yarmolyuk (yellow card) 75'	Stadium: Falmer Stadium; Attendance: 31,548; Referee: Andrew Madley

30 December 2024 19	Aston Villa	2–2	Brighton & Hove Albion	Birmingham
19:45 GMT	Watkins 36' (pen.); Rogers (yellow card) 38', (goal) 47'; Mings (yellow card) 45+3'	Report	Adingra 12'; Ayari (yellow card) 45+7'; Baleba (yellow card) 72'; Lamptey 81'; Igor (yellow card) 90+2'	Stadium: Villa Park; Attendance: 41,414; Referee: Craig Pawson

4 January 2025 20	Brighton & Hove Albion	1–1	Arsenal	Falmer
17:30 GMT	João Pedro 61' (pen.); Veltman (yellow card) 64'; Minteh (yellow card) 82'	Report	Nwaneri 16', (yellow card) 45+1'; Merino (yellow card) 84'; Calafiori (yellow card) 90'	Stadium: Falmer Stadium; Attendance: 31,714; Referee: Anthony Taylor

16 January 2025 21	Ipswich Town	0–2	Brighton & Hove Albion	Ipswich
19:30 GMT	Delap (yellow card) 49'; Woolfenden (yellow card) 62'	Report	João Pedro (yellow card) 54'; Mitoma 59'; Rutter 81'; Veltman (yellow card) 90+1'	Stadium: Portman Road; Attendance: 29,403; Referee: Tony Harrington

19 January 2025 22	Manchester United	1–3	Brighton & Hove Albion	Trafford
14:00 GMT	Fernandes 23' (pen.); Ugarte (yellow card) 61'; Maguire (yellow card) 90+5'; Yoro (yellow card) 90+8'	Report	Minteh 5', (yellow card) 43'; Baleba (yellow card) 21'; Mitoma 60'; Rutter 76'; March (yellow card) 90+8'	Stadium: Old Trafford; Attendance: 73,758; Referee: Peter Bankes

25 January 2025 23	Brighton & Hove Albion	0–1	Everton	Falmer
15:00 GMT	Verbruggen (yellow card) 41'; Baleba (yellow card) 45+2'; João Pedro (yellow card) 83'; Minteh (yellow card) 90+10'	Report	Lindstrøm (yellow card) 28'; Ndiaye 42' (pen.), (yellow card) 43'; Pickford (yellow card) 71'; O'Brien (yellow card) 90+10'	Stadium: Falmer Stadium; Attendance: 31,567; Referee: Tim Robinson

1 February 2025 24	Nottingham Forest	7–0	Brighton & Hove Albion	West Bridgford
12:30 GMT	Murillo (yellow card) 7'; Dunk 12' (o.g.); Gibbs-White 25'; Wood 32', 64', 69' (pen.); Williams 89'; Silva 90+1'	Report	Welbeck (yellow card) 11'; Hinshelwood (yellow card) 20'; Verbruggen (yellow card) 90'	Stadium: City Ground; Attendance: 30,164; Referee: Simon Hooper
Note: Fixture was initially scheduled for a 15:00 kick-off, but was moved for live TNT Sports broadcasting.

14 February 2025 25	Brighton & Hove Albion	3–0	Chelsea	Falmer
20:00 GMT	Mitoma 27'; Minteh 38', 63', (yellow card) 81'	Report	Caicedo (yellow card) 43'; Fernández (yellow card) 64'	Stadium: Falmer Stadium; Attendance: 31,503; Referee: Chris Kavanagh
Note: Fixture was initially scheduled for 15 February, but was moved for live Sky Sports broadcasting.

22 February 2025 26	Southampton	0–4	Brighton & Hove Albion	Southampton
15:00 GMT	Ugochukwu (yellow card) 2'; Ramsdale (yellow card) 57'	Report	João Pedro 23'; Rutter 56'; Mitoma 71'; Hinshelwood 82'	Stadium: St Mary's Stadium; Attendance: 30,775; Referee: Darren Bond

25 February 2025 27	Brighton & Hove Albion	2–1	Bournemouth	Falmer
19:30 GMT	João Pedro 12' (pen.); Van Hecke (yellow card) 56'; Welbeck 75'; Wieffer (yellow card) 90+7'	Report	Semenyo (yellow card) 60'; Kluivert 61'	Stadium: Falmer Stadium; Attendance: 31,138; Referee: Michael Oliver

8 March 2025 28	Brighton & Hove Albion	2–1	Fulham	Falmer
15:00 GMT	Van Hecke 41'; João Pedro 90+8' (pen.)	Report	Jiménez 35'; Robinson (yellow card) 69'; Andersen (yellow card) 90+7'	Stadium: Falmer Stadium; Attendance: 31,584; Referee: Sam Barrott

15 March 2025 29	Manchester City	2–2	Brighton & Hove Albion	Manchester
15:00 GMT	Haaland 11' (pen.); Savinho (yellow card) 15'; Marmoush 39'; Doku (yellow card) 61'	Report	João Pedro (yellow card) 10'; Mitoma (yellow card) 18'; Estupiñán 21'; Baleba (yellow card) 26'; Khusanov 48' (o.g.); Wieffer (yellow card) 89'; Verbruggen (yellow card) 90+1'	Stadium: City of Manchester Stadium; Attendance: 52,471; Referee: Simon Hooper

2 April 2025 30	Brighton & Hove Albion	0–3	Aston Villa	Falmer
19:45 BST	Hinshelwood (yellow card) 20'; Welbeck (yellow card) 90+11'	Report	Rashford 51'; Asensio 78'; Martínez (yellow card) 90'; Disasi (yellow card) 90+1'; Watkins (yellow card) 90+2'; Malen 90+10'	Stadium: Falmer Stadium; Attendance: 31,230; Referee: Stuart Attwell
Note: Fixture was initially scheduled for 1 April, but was moved for due to both clubs involvement in the FA Cup.

5 April 2025 31	Crystal Palace	2–1	Brighton & Hove Albion	Selhurst
15:00 BST	Mateta 3'; Muñoz 55'; Guéhi (yellow card) 57' (yellow-red card) 90'; Nketiah (yellow card) 69' (yellow-red card) 78'	Report	Van Hecke (yellow card) 25' (yellow-red card) 90+6'; Welbeck 31'; March (yellow card) 80'	Stadium: Selhurst Park; Attendance: 24,564; Referee: Anthony Taylor

12 April 2025 32	Brighton & Hove Albion	2–2	Leicester City	Falmer
15:00 BST	João Pedro 31' (pen.), 55' (pen.); Estupiñán (yellow card) 45+1'; Dunk (yellow card) 71'	Report	El Khannouss (yellow card) 8'; Coady (yellow card) 29'; Hermansen (yellow card) 31'; Mavididi 38'; Okoli (yellow card) 63', (goal) 74'; Skipp (yellow card) 68'	Stadium: Falmer Stadium; Attendance: 31,150; Referee: Darren Bond

19 April 2025 33	Brentford	4–2	Brighton & Hove Albion	Brentford
15:00 BST	Mbeumo 9', 48'; Kayode (yellow card) 18'; Wissa 58'; Jensen (yellow card) 90+1'; Nørgaard 90+5'; Collins (yellow card) 90+7'	Report	Welbeck (yellow card) 40', (goal) 45+3'; João Pedro (red card) 61'; Mitoma 81'; Estupiñán (yellow card) 90+4'; Van Hecke (yellow card) 90+7'	Stadium: Brentford Community Stadium; Attendance: 17,083; Referee: Tim Robinson

26 April 2025 34	Brighton & Hove Albion	3–2	West Ham United	Falmer
15:00 BST	Ayari 13'; Hinshelwood (yellow card) 80'; Mitoma 89'; Baleba 90+2'	Report	Mavropanos (yellow card) 29'; Kudus 48'; Souček 83'	Stadium: Falmer Stadium; Attendance: 31,499; Referee: Darren England

4 May 2025 35	Brighton & Hove Albion	1–1	Newcastle United	Falmer
14:00 BST	Minteh 28'; Wieffer (yellow card) 32'; Welbeck (yellow card) 90+3'	Report	Willock (yellow card) 72'; Isak 89' (pen.)	Stadium: Falmer Stadium; Attendance: 31,580; Referee: Craig Pawson
Note: Fixture was initially scheduled for 3 May, but was moved for live Sky Sports broadcasting.

10 May 2025 36	Wolverhampton Wanderers	0–2	Brighton & Hove Albion	Wolverhampton
15:00 BST	Cunha (yellow card) 27'	Report	Welbeck 28' (pen.); Wieffer (yellow card) 45+4'; Gruda 85'	Stadium: Molineux Stadium; Attendance: 31,279; Referee: Michael Oliver

19 May 2025 37	Brighton & Hove Albion	3–2	Liverpool	Falmer
20:00 BST	Ayari 32'; Mitoma 69'; Webster (yellow card) 77'; Hinshelwood 85'	Report	Elliott 9'; Szoboszlai 45+1'	Stadium: Falmer Stadium; Attendance: 31,611; Referee: Andrew Madley
Note: Fixture was initially scheduled for 18 May, but was moved for live Sky Sports broadcast.

25 May 2025 38	Tottenham Hotspur	1–4	Brighton & Hove Albion	Tottenham
16:00 BST	Solanke 17' (pen.); Bentancur (yellow card) 38'; Porro (yellow card) 58'; Davies (yellow card) 80'	Report	Hinshelwood 51', 64'; Veltman (yellow card) 79'; O'Riley 88' (pen.); Gómez 90+3'	Stadium: Tottenham Hotspur Stadium; Attendance: 61,449; Referee: Robert Jones

=== FA Cup ===
Brighton entered the FA Cup at the third round stage, and were drawn away against Norwich City, then at home to Chelsea in the fourth round, away to Newcastle United in the fifth round, and at home to Nottingham Forest in the quarter-finals.

Win Draw Loss Fixtures

11 January 2025 Third round	Norwich City	0–4	Brighton & Hove Albion	Norwich
15:00 GMT		Report	Rutter 37', 45+2'; Enciso 59'; March 74'	Stadium: Carrow Road; Attendance: 24,738; Referee: Simon Hooper

8 February 2025 Fourth round	Brighton & Hove Albion	2–1	Chelsea	Falmer
20:00 GMT	Rutter 12', (yellow card) 20'; Veltman (yellow card) 27'; Mitoma 57'	Report	Verbruggen 5' (o.g.); Dewsbury-Hall (yellow card) 14'; Caicedo (yellow card) 68'	Stadium: Falmer Stadium; Attendance: 23,279; Referee: Jarred Gillett

2 March 2025 Fifth round	Newcastle United	1–2 (a.e.t.)	Brighton & Hove Albion	Newcastle upon Tyne
13:45 GMT	Isak 22' (pen.); Joelinton (yellow card) 36'; Gordon (red card) 83'	Report	Lamptey (yellow card) 29' (yellow-red card) 90+1'; Webster (yellow card) 35'; Minteh 44'; Baleba (yellow card) 45+2'; Gómez (yellow card) 92'; Welbeck 114'	Stadium: St James' Park; Attendance: 51,566; Referee: Anthony Taylor

29 March 2025 Quarter-finals	Brighton & Hove Albion	0–0 (a.e.t.) (3–4 p)	Nottingham Forest	Falmer
17:15 GMT	Estupiñán (yellow card) 62'; Gruda (yellow card) 114'	Report	Domínguez (yellow card) 88'; Yates (yellow card) 97'; Williams (yellow card) 111'; Gibbs-White (yellow card) 120'	Stadium: Falmer Stadium; Attendance: 29,930; Referee: Peter Bankes
	Penalties
	João Pedro (penalty scored); Gruda (penalty scored); Hinshelwood (penalty missed); Gómez (penalty missed); Dunk (penalty scored)		(penalty scored) Anderson; (penalty scored) Hudson-Odoi; (penalty missed) Williams; (penalty scored) Milenković; (penalty scored) Yates

=== EFL Cup ===
Brighton entered the EFL Cup in the second round, and were drawn at home to fellow Sussex team Crawley Town. They were then drawn at home against Wolverhampton Wanderers in the third round, and at home against defending champions Liverpool in the fourth round.

Win Draw Loss Fixtures

27 August 2024 Second round	Brighton & Hove Albion	4–0	Crawley Town	Falmer
19:45 BST	Adingra 31'; Ayari (yellow card) 43'; Sarmiento 48'; Igor (yellow card) 60'; Webster 84'; O'Mahony 86'	Report	Williams (yellow card) 16'; Mullarkey (yellow card) 33'; Bragg (yellow card) 68'; Roles (red card) 90+1'	Stadium: Falmer Stadium; Attendance: 19,175; Referee: Alex Chilowicz

18 September 2024 Third round	Brighton & Hove Albion	3–2	Wolverhampton Wanderers	Falmer
19:45 BST	Baleba 14'; Adingra 31'; Estupiñán (yellow card) 36'; Hinshelwood (yellow card) 47'; Ferguson (yellow card) 62'; Moder (yellow card) 68'; Kadıoğlu 85'; Webster (yellow card) 90'	Report	Guedes 44'; Sarabia (yellow card) 45+1'; Doyle (yellow card) 75', (goal) 90+1'	Stadium: Falmer Stadium; Attendance: 16,018; Referee: John Brooks

30 October 2024 Fourth round	Brighton & Hove Albion	2–3	Liverpool	Falmer
19:30 GMT	Adingra 81'; Lamptey 90'	Report	Gakpo 46', 63'; Endō (yellow card) 51'; Díaz 85'; Konaté (yellow card) 90+2'	Stadium: Falmer Stadium; Attendance: 28,441; Referee: Darren Bond

== Statistics ==
=== Appearances and goals ===
As of match played 25 May 2025

Players with no appearances are not included on the list

No.	Pos	Nat	Player	Total		Premier League		FA Cup		EFL Cup	
No.	Pos	Nat	Player	Apps	Goals	Apps	Goals	Apps	Goals	Apps	Goals
1	GK	(Netherlands) NED	Bart Verbruggen	40	0	36	0	3	0	1	0
2	DF	(Ghana) GHA	Tariq Lamptey	20	3	10+5	2	2	0	2+1	1
3	DF	(Brazil) BRA	Igor Julio	15	0	9+3	0	0	0	3	0
4	DF	(England) ENG	Adam Webster	20	1	11+3	0	3+1	0	2	1
5	DF	(England) ENG	Lewis Dunk	27	0	23+2	0	1+1	0	0	0
6	MF	(England) ENG	James Milner	4	0	3+1	0	0	0	0	0
7	MF	(England) ENG	Solly March	10	1	1+7	0	0+2	1	0	0
8	MF	(Germany) GER	Brajan Gruda	25	1	8+13	1	0+3	0	1	0
9	FW	(Brazil) BRA	João Pedro	30	10	23+4	10	1+2	0	0	0
10	MF	(Paraguay) PAR	Julio Enciso	16	1	2+10	0	1	1	3	0
11	MF	(Ivory Coast) CIV	Simon Adingra	33	5	12+17	2	0+1	0	3	3
14	FW	(France) FRA	Georginio Rutter	32	8	19+9	5	4	3	0	0
16	DF	(Republic of Ireland) IRL	Eiran Cashin	2	0	0+2	0	0	0	0	0
17	MF	(The Gambia) GAM	Yankuba Minteh	37	7	20+12	6	4	1	1	0
18	FW	(England) ENG	Danny Welbeck	36	11	24+6	10	2+2	1	0+2	0
20	MF	(Cameroon) CMR	Carlos Baleba	40	4	31+3	3	4	0	2	1
22	MF	(Japan) JPN	Kaoru Mitoma	41	11	28+8	10	4	1	0+1	0
23	GK	(England) ENG	Jason Steele	5	0	2	0	1	0	2	0
24	DF	(Turkey) TUR	Ferdi Kadıoğlu	8	2	5+1	1	0	0	1+1	1
25	MF	(Paraguay) PAR	Diego Gómez	19	1	4+12	1	0+3	0	0	0
26	MF	(Sweden) SWE	Yasin Ayari	39	2	22+12	2	2+1	0	1+1	0
27	MF	(Netherlands) NED	Mats Wieffer	28	1	10+15	1	0+1	0	1+1	0
28	FW	(Republic of Ireland) IRL	Evan Ferguson	15	1	2+11	1	0	0	2	0
29	DF	(Netherlands) NED	Jan Paul van Hecke	39	1	33+1	1	4	0	1	0
30	DF	(Ecuador) ECU	Pervis Estupiñán	36	1	26+4	1	3	0	1+2	0
33	MF	(Denmark) DEN	Matt O'Riley	23	2	11+10	2	0+1	0	1	0
34	DF	(Netherlands) NED	Joël Veltman	24	0	19+2	0	2	0	0+1	0
41	MF	(England) ENG	Jack Hinshelwood	31	5	22+4	5	3	0	1+1	0
49	DF	(England) ENG	Odel Offiah	1	0	0	0	0	0	0+1	0
51	FW	(Republic of Ireland) IRL	Mark O'Mahony	1	1	0	0	0	0	0+1	1
72	MF	(England) ENG	Harry Howell	1	0	0+1	0	0	0	0	0
	MF	(Ecuador) ECU	Jeremy Sarmiento	2	1	0+1	0	0	0	1	1
Player(s) who featured but departed the club permanently during the season:
11	MF	(Scotland) SCO	Billy Gilmour	2	0	1+1	0	0	0	0	0
15	MF	(Poland) POL	Jakub Moder	7	0	0+4	0	0+1	0	2	0
32	MF	(Australia) AUS	Cameron Peupion	1	0	0	0	0	0	0+1	0
37	MF	(England) ENG	Jensen Weir	1	0	0	0	0	0	0+1	0
44	DF	(Northern Ireland) NIR	Ruairi McConville	1	0	0	0	0+1	0	0	0
47	DF	(England) ENG	Imari Samuels	1	0	0	0	0	0	1	0

=== Goalscorers ===
As of match played 25 May 2025

- Italics indicates the player has been loaned to another club.
- ~~Strikethrough~~ indicates the player has been transferred to another club.

Rank	No.	Pos.	Nat.	Player	Premier League	FA Cup	EFL Cup	Total
1	18	CF	(England)	Danny Welbeck	10	1	0	11
1	22	LW	(Japan)	Kaoru Mitoma	10	1	0	11
3	9	CF	(Brazil)	João Pedro	10	0	0	10
4	14	CF	(France)	Georginio Rutter	5	3	0	8
5	17	RW	(The Gambia)	Yankuba Minteh	6	1	0	7
6	11	LW	(Ivory Coast)	Simon Adingra	2	0	3	5
6	41	CM	(England)	Jack Hinshelwood	5	0	0	5
8	20	CM	(Cameroon)	Carlos Baleba	3	0	1	4
9	2	RB	(Ghana)	Tariq Lamptey	2	0	1	3
10	24	LB	(Turkey)	Ferdi Kadıoğlu	1	0	1	2
10	27	CM	(Sweden)	Yasin Ayari	2	0	0	2
10	33	CM	(Denmark)	Matt O'Riley	2	0	0	2
13	4	CB	(England)	Adam Webster	0	0	1	1
13	7	RW	(England)	Solly March	0	1	0	1
13	8	AM	(Germany)	Brajan Gruda	1	0	0	1
13	10	CF	(Paraguay)	Julio Enciso	0	1	0	1
13	25	CM	(Paraguay)	Diego Gómez	1	0	0	1
13	27	CM	(Netherlands)	Mats Wieffer	1	0	0	1
13	28	CF	(Republic of Ireland)	Evan Ferguson	1	0	0	1
13	29	CB	(Netherlands)	Jan Paul van Hecke	1	0	0	1
13	30	LB	(Ecuador)	Pervis Estupiñán	1	0	0	1
13	51	CF	(Republic of Ireland)	Mark O'Mahony	0	0	1	1
13		AM	(Ecuador)	Jeremy Sarmiento	0	0	1	1
Own goals					2	0	0	2
Totals					66	8	9	83

=== Assists ===
As of match played 25 May 2025

Rank	No.	Pos.	Nat.	Player	Premier League	FA Cup	EFL Cup	Total
1	9	CF	(Brazil)	João Pedro	6	1	0	7
2	8	AM	(Germany)	Brajan Gruda	4	1	0	5
2	17	RW	(The Gambia)	Yankuba Minteh	4	1	0	5
4	14	CF	(France)	Georginio Rutter	3	1	0	4
4	18	CF	(England)	Danny Welbeck	4	0	0	4
4	22	LW	(Japan)	Kaoru Mitoma	4	0	0	4
4	27	CM	(Netherlands)	Mats Wieffer	4	0	0	4
8	2	RB	(Ghana)	Tariq Lamptey	2	0	0	2
8	11	LW	(Ivory Coast)	Simon Adingra	2	0	0	2
8	20	CM	(Cameroon)	Carlos Baleba	1	0	1	2
8	33	CM	(Denmark)	Matt O'Riley	2	0	0	2
8	34	RB	(Netherlands)	Joël Veltman	0	2	0	2
8	41	CM	(England)	Jack Hinshelwood	2	0	0	2
14	1	GK	(Netherlands)	Bart Verbruggen	1	0	0	1
14	4	CB	(England)	Adam Webster	0	0	1	1
14	7	RW	(England)	Solly March	0	1	0	1
14	10	CF	(Paraguay)	Julio Enciso	0	0	1	1
14	26	CM	(Sweden)	Yasin Ayari	1	0	0	1
14	29	CB	(Netherlands)	Jan Paul van Hecke	1	0	0	1
14	30	LB	(Ecuador)	Pervis Estupiñán	1	0	0	1
14	~~32~~	AM	(Australia)	~~Cameron Peupion~~	0	0	1	1
Totals					43	7	4	53

=== Clean sheets ===
As of match played 25 May 2025

Rank	No.	Pos.	Nat.	Player	Matches played	Clean sheet %	Premier League	FA Cup	EFL Cup	Total
1	1	GK	(Netherlands)	Bart Verbruggen	40	22.50%	7	1	1	9
2	23	GK	(England)	Jason Steele	5	40.00%	1	1	0	2
Totals					45	24.44%	8	2	1	11

=== Disciplinary record ===
As of match played 25 May 2025

No.	Pos.	Nat.	Player	Premier League			FA Cup			EFL Cup			Total		
No.	Pos.	Nat.	Player	Yellow card	(yellow card) (yellow-red card)	Red card	Yellow card	(yellow card) (yellow-red card)	Red card	Yellow card	(yellow card) (yellow-red card)	Red card	Yellow card	(yellow card) (yellow-red card)	Red card
1	GK	(Netherlands)	Bart Verbruggen	4	0	0	0	0	0	0	0	0	4	0	0
2	RB	(Ghana)	Tariq Lamptey	0	0	0	0	1	0	0	0	0	0	1	0
3	CB	(Brazil)	Igor Julio	4	0	0	0	0	0	1	0	0	5	0	0
4	CB	(England)	Adam Webster	1	0	0	1	0	0	1	0	0	3	0	0
5	CB	(England)	Lewis Dunk	5	0	0	0	0	0	0	0	0	5	0	0
6	CM	(England)	James Milner	1	0	0	0	0	0	0	0	0	1	0	0
7	RW	(England)	Solly March	2	0	0	0	0	0	0	0	0	2	0	0
8	AM	(Germany)	Brajan Gruda	0	0	0	1	0	0	0	0	0	1	0	0
9	CF	(Brazil)	João Pedro	4	0	1	0	0	0	0	0	0	4	0	1
14	CF	(France)	Georginio Rutter	2	0	0	1	0	0	0	0	0	3	0	0
~~15~~	CM	(Poland)	~~Jakub Moder~~	0	0	0	0	0	0	1	0	0	1	0	0
17	RW	(The Gambia)	Yankuba Minteh	6	0	0	0	0	0	0	0	0	6	0	0
18	CF	(England)	Danny Welbeck	5	0	0	0	0	0	0	0	0	5	0	0
20	CM	(Cameroon)	Carlos Baleba	8	1	0	1	0	0	0	0	0	9	1	0
22	LW	(Japan)	Kaoru Mitoma	1	0	0	0	0	0	0	0	0	1	0	0
24	LB	(Turkey)	Ferdi Kadıoğlu	1	0	0	0	0	0	0	0	0	1	0	0
25	CM	(Paraguay)	Diego Gómez	0	0	0	1	0	0	0	0	0	1	0	0
26	CM	(Sweden)	Yasin Ayari	3	0	0	0	0	0	1	0	0	4	0	0
27	CM	(Netherlands)	Mats Wieffer	6	0	0	0	0	0	0	0	0	6	0	0
28	CF	(Republic of Ireland)	Evan Ferguson	0	0	0	0	0	0	1	0	0	1	0	0
29	CB	(Netherlands)	Jan Paul van Hecke	5	1	0	0	0	0	1	0	0	6	1	0
30	LB	(Ecuador)	Pervis Estupiñán	5	0	0	1	0	0	1	0	0	7	0	0
33	CM	(Denmark)	Matt O'Riley	1	0	0	0	0	0	0	0	0	1	0	0
34	RB	(Netherlands)	Joël Veltman	5	0	0	1	0	0	0	0	0	6	0	0
41	CM	(England)	Jack Hinshelwood	5	0	0	0	0	0	1	0	0	6	0	0
Total				74	2	1	7	1	0	8	0	0	89	3	1
