= 2025–26 Brighton & Hove Albion F.C. season =

124th season in existence of Brighton & Hove Albion FC

Brighton & Hove Albion
2025–26 season
- Owner: Tony Bloom
- Chairman: Tony Bloom
- Head coach: Fabian Hürzeler
- Stadium: Falmer Stadium
- Premier League: 8th
- FA Cup: Fourth round
- EFL Cup: Fourth round
- Top goalscorer: League: Danny Welbeck (13); All: Danny Welbeck (14)
- Highest home attendance: 31,729 (vs Manchester United, Premier League, 24 May 2026)
- Lowest home attendance: 30,172 (vs Bournemouth, Premier League, 19 January 2026)
- Average home league attendance: 31,379
- Biggest win: 6–0 vs Oxford United (A) (EFL Cup – 27 August 2025); 6–0 vs Barnsley (A) (EFL Cup – 23 September 2025)
- Biggest defeat: 0–3 vs Liverpool (A) (FA Cup – 14 February 2026); 0–3 vs Manchester United (H) (Premier League – 24 May 2026)
Home colours	Away colours	Third colours

The 2025–26 season was the 124th season in the history of Brighton & Hove Albion, and their ninth consecutive season in the Premier League. In addition to the domestic league, the club also participated in the FA Cup and the EFL Cup.

Brighton finished the league season in eighth place, qualifying for European football in the Conference League play-off stage.

== Squad ==
As of 2 February 2026

Note: Flags indicate national team as defined under FIFA eligibility rules; some limited exceptions apply. Players may hold more than one non-FIFA nationality.

No.	Pos.	Nation	Player
1	GK	NED	Bart Verbruggen
3	DF	BRA	Igor Julio
4	DF	ENG	Adam Webster
5	DF	ENG	Lewis Dunk (captain)
6	DF	NED	Jan Paul van Hecke
7	MF	ENG	Solly March
9	FW	GRE	Stefanos Tzimas
10	FW	FRA	Georginio Rutter
11	MF	GAM	Yankuba Minteh
13	MF	ENG	Jack Hinshelwood
17	MF	CMR	Carlos Baleba
18	FW	ENG	Danny Welbeck
19	FW	GRE	Charalampos Kostoulas

No.	Pos.	Nation	Player
20	MF	ENG	James Milner
21	DF	FRA	Olivier Boscagli
22	MF	JPN	Kaoru Mitoma
23	GK	ENG	Jason Steele
24	DF	TUR	Ferdi Kadıoğlu
25	MF	PAR	Diego Gómez
26	MF	SWE	Yasin Ayari
27	MF	NED	Mats Wieffer
29	DF	BEL	Maxim De Cuyper
30	MF	GER	Pascal Groß
33	MF	DEN	Matt O'Riley
34	DF	NED	Joël Veltman
38	GK	CAN	Tom McGill

== Transfers and contracts ==
=== In ===
Date	Pos.	Player	From	Fee	Ref.
First team
1 June 2025 (Note: The transfer was announced on 1 April, but became official on 1 June when the summer transfer window opened)	LW	(England) Tom Watson	(England) Sunderland	£10,000,000	
17 June 2025	CB	(Italy) Diego Coppola	(Italy) Hellas Verona	£9,500,000	
1 July 2025 (Note: The transfer was announced on 21 March, but became official on 1 July during the summer transfer window)	RW	(South Korea) Yoon Do-young	(South Korea) Daejeon Hana Citizen	£2,000,000	
1 July 2025 (Note: The transfer was announced on 12 June, but became official on 1 July during the summer transfer window)	FW	(Greece) Charalampos Kostoulas	(Greece) Olympiacos	£29,780,000	
2 July 2025	CB	(France) Olivier Boscagli	(Netherlands) PSV Eindhoven	Free	
5 July 2025	LB	(Belgium) Maxim De Cuyper	(Belgium) Club Brugge	£17,500,000	
2 January 2026	CM	(Germany) Pascal Groß	(Germany) Borussia Dortmund	Undisclosed	
Academy
25 June 2025	GK	(Republic of Ireland) Michael Dike	(Republic of Ireland) Treaty United	Undisclosed	
29 June 2025	GK	(Sweden) Nils Ramming	(Germany) Eintracht Frankfurt	Undisclosed	
1 July 2025	CB	(England) Ben Barclay	(England) Carlisle United	Free	
1 August 2025	LB	(Republic of Ireland) Sean Keogh	(Republic of Ireland) Dundalk	Undisclosed	
1 August 2025	CAM	(England) Kofi Shaw	(England) Bristol Rovers	Undisclosed	
15 October 2025	MF	(England) Anton Palmer	(England) Middlesbrough	Undisclosed	
15 October 2025	MF	(England) Bailey Palmer	(England) Middlesbrough	Undisclosed	

Expenditure: ▼£68,780,000

=== Out ===
Date	Pos.	Player	To	Fee	Ref.
First team
2 July 2025	LB	(Argentina) Valentín Barco	(France) RC Strasbourg	Undisclosed	
2 July 2025	CF	(Brazil) João Pedro	(England) Chelsea	Undisclosed	
10 July 2025	LW	(Ivory Coast) Simon Adingra	(England) Sunderland	£21,000,000+	
24 July 2025	LB	(Ecuador) Pervis Estupiñán	(Italy) AC Milan	£17,000,000	
24 July 2025	GK	(Netherlands) Kjell Scherpen	(Belgium) Royale Union Saint-Gilloise	Undisclosed	
29 August 2025	RW	(Senegal) Abdallah Sima	(France) Lens	Undisclosed	
1 September 2025	CAM	(Paraguay) Julio Enciso	(France) Strasbourg	Undisclosed	
1 September 2025	RB	(Ghana) Tariq Lamptey	(Italy) Fiorentina	£5,200,000	
Academy
5 July 2025	RB	(England) Odeluga Offiah	(England) Preston North End	£1,000,000+	
15 July 2025	MF	(Republic of Ireland) Jamie Mullins	(England) Wycombe Wanderers	Undisclosed	
31 August 2025	MF	(Romania) Adrian Mazilu	(Romania) Dinamo București	Undisclosed	
31 January 2026	CM	(England) Joe Knight	(England) Stevenage	Undisclosed	
2 February 2026	CM	(Republic of Ireland) Andrew Moran	(England) Preston North End	£1,000,000	

=== Loaned out ===
Date	Pos.	Player	To	Date until	Ref.
First team
8 July 2025	LW	(Ghana) Ibrahim Osman	(France) Auxerre	19 January 2026 (Note: On 19 January, Osman was recalled back from his season-long loan at Auxerre and subsequently joined Birmingham City on loan)	
16 July 2025	RW	(South Korea) Yoon Do-young	(Netherlands) Excelsior	9 January 2026 (Note: On 9 January, Yoon Do-young was recalled back from his season-long loan at Excelsior and subsequently joined Dordrecht on loan)	
23 July 2025	CF	(Republic of Ireland) Evan Ferguson	(Italy) Roma	30 June 2026	
25 July 2025	CB	(Republic of Ireland) Eiran Cashin	(England) Birmingham City	6 January 2026 (Note: On 6 January, Cashin was recalled back from his season-long loan at Birmingham and subsequently joined Blackburn on loan)	
14 August 2025	CM	(Ivory Coast) Malick Yalcouyé	(Wales) Swansea City	30 June 2026	
1 September 2025	CAM	(Argentina) Facundo Buonanotte	(England) Chelsea	15 January 2026 (Note: On 15 January, Buonanotte was recalled back from his season-long loan at Chelsea and subsequently joined Leeds United on loan)	
1 September 2025	CB	(Brazil) Igor	(England) West Ham United	27 January 2026 (Note: On 27 January, Igor's initial season-long loan at West Ham United was terminated)	
1 September 2025	CAM	(Ecuador) Jeremy Sarmiento	(Italy) Cremonese	27 January 2026 (Note: On 27 January, Sarmiento was recalled back from his season-long loan at Cremonese and subsequently joined Middlesbrough on loan)	
2 September 2025	CM	(Denmark) Matt O'Riley	(France) Marseille	2 February 2026 (Note: On 2 February, O'Riley returned from his season-long loan at Marseille)	
6 January 2026	CB	(Republic of Ireland) Eiran Cashin	(England) Blackburn Rovers	30 June 2026	
9 January 2026	RW	(South Korea) Yoon Do-young	(Netherlands) Dordrecht	30 June 2026	
15 January 2026	CAM	(Argentina) Facundo Buonanotte	(England) Leeds United	30 June 2026	
19 January 2026	LW	(Ghana) Ibrahim Osman	(England) Birmingham City	30 June 2026	
27 January 2026	CAM	(Ecuador) Jeremy Sarmiento	(England) Middlesbrough	30 June 2026	
29 January 2026	CB	(Italy) Diego Coppola	(France) Paris	30 June 2026	
1 February 2026	LW	(England) Tom Watson	(England) Millwall	30 June 2026	
2 February 2026	RW	(Germany) Brajan Gruda	(Germany) RB Leipzig	30 June 2026	
Academy
21 July 2025	FW	(England) Caylan Vickers	(England) Barnsley	9 January 2026 (Note: On 9 January, Vickers was recalled back from his season-long loan at Barnsley)	
24 July 2025	GK	(England) Carl Rushworth	(England) Coventry City	30 June 2026	
1 July 2025	GK	(England) James Beadle	(England) Birmingham City	30 June 2026	
5 July 2025	CAM	(England) Amario Cozier-Duberry	(England) Bolton Wanderers	30 June 2026	
7 July 2025	CF	(Republic of Ireland) Mark O'Mahony	(England) Reading	30 June 2026	
4 August 2025	CAM	(England) Kamari Doyle	(England) Reading	30 June 2026	
21 August 2025	CAM	(Republic of Ireland) Andrew Moran	(United States) Los Angeles	31 December 2025	
1 September 2025	CB	(England) Charlie Penman	(England) Aldershot Town	30 June 2026	
1 September 2025	LB	(Republic of Ireland) Jacob Slater	(England) Harrogate Town	31 May 2026 (Note: On 8 January, Slater's loan at Harrogate Town was extended until the end of the season)	
2 February 2026	FW	(England) Caylan Vickers	(England) Wigan Athletic	30 June 2026	
13 February 2026	GK	(Republic of Ireland) Michael Dike	(England) Burgess Hill Town	25 April 2026	

=== Released / Out of contract ===
Date	Pos.	Player	Team	Subsequent club	Join date	Ref.
30 June 2025	GK	(Republic of Ireland) Killian Cahill	Under-21s	(England) Leyton Orient	1 July 2025	
30 June 2025	FW	(England) Louis Flower	Under-21s	(England) Crawley Town	4 July 2025	
30 June 2025	MF	(England) Remerio Moulton	Under-21s	(England) Watford	30 July 2025	
30 June 2025	CB	(England) Ben Jackson	Under-21s	(England) Aldershot Town	31 July 2025	
30 June 2025	DF	(England) Harry Lee	Under-21s	(England) Bromley	July 2025 (Note: Lee signed for Bromley on an unspecified date in July 2025, before signing dual-registration with Poole Town on 8 August 2025 as shown in the reference)	
30 June 2025	FW	(Jamaica) Joshua Duffus	Under-21s	(France) Saint-Étienne	13 August 2025	
30 June 2025	MF	(Tunisia) Samy Chouchane	Under-21s	(France) Dijon	18 August 2025	
30 June 2025	MF	(Pakistan) Sahil Bashir	Under-21s	(England) Huddersfield Town	20 August 2025	
30 June 2025	GK	(England) Hugo Fisher	Under-21s	(England) Southampton	1 September 2025	
30 June 2025	AM	(England) Luca Barrington	Under-21s	(England) Boston United	2 March 2026	
30 June 2025	MF	(Republic of Ireland) Ronnie Gorman	Under-18s	(England) Horsham	August 2025	
30 June 2025	GK	(England) Alfie Mansell	Under-18s	(England) Burgess Hill Town		

=== New contracts ===
Date	Pos.	Player	Contract end	Ref.
4 June 2025	RB	(England) Charlie Tasker	Undisclosed	
9 June 2025	GK	(Denmark) Sebastian Jensen	30 June 2026	
9 June 2025	RB	(Ghana) Tariq Lamptey	30 June 2026	
9 June 2025	LM	(Cyprus) Harry Mills	30 June 2026	
9 June 2025	AM	(Republic of Ireland) Jamie Mullins	30 June 2026	
9 June 2025	RB	(England) Odeluga Offiah	30 June 2026	
9 June 2025	LW	(Senegal) Abdallah Sima	30 June 2026	
13 June 2025	CM	(England) James Milner	30 June 2026	
8 July 2025	CF	(Wales) Joe Belmont	Undisclosed (Note: First professional contract)	
8 July 2025	GK	(England) Lorenz Ferdinand	Undisclosed	
8 July 2025	RB	(England) Matthew Hayden	Undisclosed	
8 July 2025	AM	(England) Harry Howell	Undisclosed	
8 July 2025	CM	(Wales) Henry Kasvosve	Undisclosed	
8 July 2025	CM	(United States) Darius Lane	Undisclosed	
8 July 2025	CB	(England) Callum Mackley	Undisclosed	
8 July 2025	CM	(England) Shane Nti	Undisclosed	
8 July 2025	LW	(Nigeria) Nehemiah Oriola	Undisclosed	
8 July 2025	CDM	(Ghana) Yussif Owusu	Undisclosed	
8 July 2025	LW	(England) Tyler Silsby	Undisclosed	
8 July 2025	CB	(England) Freddie Simmonds	Undisclosed	
16 October 2025	GK	(England) Jason Steele	30 June 2027	
6 February 2026	MF	(England) Josh Robertson	30 June 2028	
6 March 2026	CDM	(England) Jack Hinshelwood	30 June 2029	

== Pre-season and friendlies ==
On 29 May, Brighton & Hove Albion announced their first two pre-season fixtures, against Southampton and Wolfsburg.

Win Draw Loss Fixtures

12 July 2025 Friendly	Brighton & Hove Albion	6–1	Wycombe Wanderers	Lancing
	Welbeck 2', 20', 31', 45'; Buonanotte 85'; Tasker 88'	Report	Quitirna 12'	Stadium: American Express Elite Football Performance Centre; Attendance: 0 (Behind closed doors)

16 July 2025 Friendly	Brighton & Hove Albion	3–1	Stoke City	Andalusia, Spain
18:00 BST	Mitoma 35'; Coppola 49'; Rutter 90+1'	Report	Baker 39' (pen.)	Stadium: Andalusia Training Ground; Attendance: 0 (Behind closed doors)

21 July 2025 Friendly	Brighton & Hove Albion	2–0	Las Palmas	Marbella, Spain
18:00 BST	Ayari 15'; O'Riley 16'	Report		Stadium: Marbella Football Centre; Attendance: 0 (Behind closed doors)

26 July 2025 Friendly	Brighton & Hove Albion	2–0	Coventry City	Lancing
	Ayari 23'; Sima 78'	Report		Stadium: American Express Elite Football Performance Centre; Attendance: 0 (Behind closed doors)

2 August 2025 Friendly	Southampton	0–1	Brighton & Hove Albion	Southampton
11:00 BST		Report	Sarmiento 19'	Stadium: St Mary's Stadium; Attendance: 0 (Behind closed doors)
Note: 60-minute match

2 August 2025 Friendly	Southampton	2–2	Brighton & Hove Albion	Southampton
15:30 BST	Robinson 69'; Armstrong 73'	Report	Minteh 25', 64'	Stadium: St Mary's Stadium; Attendance: 11,226

9 August 2025 Friendly	Brighton & Hove Albion	2–0	VfL Wolfsburg	Lancing
11:30 BST	Gruda; Sarmiento 69'	Report		Stadium: American Express Elite Football Performance Centre; Attendance: 0 (Behind closed doors)

9 August 2025 Friendly	Brighton & Hove Albion	2–1	VfL Wolfsburg	Falmer
17:00 BST	Rutter 16'; Dunk (yellow card) 20'; Minteh (yellow card) 54'; De Cuyper 73'	Report	Rogério 80'	Stadium: Falmer Stadium; Attendance: 10,000; Referee: Michael Salisbury

== Competitions ==
=== Overall record ===
Competition	First match	Last match	Starting round	Final position	Record							
Competition	First match	Last match	Starting round	Final position	Pld	W	D	L	GF	GA	GD	Win %
Premier League	16 August 2025	24 May 2026	Matchday 1	8th	38	14	11	13	52	46	+6	36.84
FA Cup	11 January 2026	14 February 2026	Third round	Fourth round	2	1	0	1	2	4	−2	50.00
EFL Cup	27 August 2025	29 October 2025	Second round	Fourth round	3	2	0	1	12	2	+10	66.67
Total					43	17	11	15	66	52	+14	39.53

Source: Soccerway

=== Premier League ===
==== League table ====
Pos	Team	Pld	W	D	L	GF	GA	GD	Pts	Qualification or relegation
6	Bournemouth	38	13	18	7	58	54	+4	57	Qualification for the Europa League league phase (Note: Since the winners of the 2025–26 FA Cup and 2025–26 EFL Cup, Manchester City, qualified for the Champions League by league position, the spot reserved for the FA Cup winners (Europa League league phase) was passed to the seventh-placed team, and the spot reserved for the EFL Cup winners (Conference League play-off round) was passed to the eighth-placed team.)
7	Sunderland	38	14	12	12	42	48	−6	54	Qualification for the Europa League league phase
8	Brighton & Hove Albion	38	14	11	13	52	46	+6	53	Qualification for the Conference League play-off round
9	Brentford	38	14	11	13	55	52	+3	53	
10	Chelsea	38	14	10	14	58	52	+6	52	

Source: Premier League
Rules for classification: 1) Points; 2) Goal difference; 3) Goals scored; 4) If the champions, relegated teams or qualified teams for UEFA competitions cannot be determined by rules 1 to 3, rules 4.1 to 4.3 are applied – 4.1) Points gained in head-to-head record between such teams; 4.2) Away goals scored in head-to-head record between such teams; 4.3) Play-offs

==== Results summary ====
Overall								Home						Away					
Pld	W	D	L	GF	GA	GD	Pts	W	D	L	GF	GA	GD	W	D	L	GF	GA	GD
38	14	11	13	52	46	+6	53	9	6	4	30	20	+10	5	5	9	22	26	−4

Source: Soccerway

==== Results by round ====
Round	1	2	3	4	5	6	7	8	9	10	11	12	13	14	15	16	17	18	19	20	21	22	23	24	25	26	27	28	29	30	31	32	33	34	35	36	37	38
Ground	H	A	H	A	H	A	A	H	A	H	A	H	A	H	H	A	H	A	A	H	A	H	A	H	H	A	A	H	H	A	H	A	A	H	A	H	A	H
Result	D	L	W	L	D	W	D	W	L	W	D	W	W	L	D	L	D	L	D	W	D	D	L	D	L	L	W	W	L	W	W	W	D	W	L	W	L	L
Position	8	18	11	13	14	10	12	10	13	10	11	6	5	7	8	10	9	13	14	10	11	12	12	13	14	14	14	11	14	12	10	9	9	6	8	7	7	8
Points	1	1	4	4	5	8	9	12	12	15	16	19	22	22	23	23	24	24	25	28	29	30	30	31	31	31	34	37	37	40	43	46	47	50	50	53	53	53

Source: Soccerway
A = Away; H = Home; W = Win; D = Draw; L = Loss; P = Postponed

==== Matches ====
On 18 June 2025, the Premier League fixtures were released.

Win Draw Loss Fixtures

16 August 2025 1	Brighton & Hove Albion	1–1	Fulham	Falmer
15:00 BST	O'Riley 55' (pen.); Mitoma (yellow card) 60'; Kadıoğlu (yellow card) 73'; Gómez (yellow card) 78'	Report	Bassey (yellow card) 31'; Cairney (yellow card) 90+3'; Muniz 90+7', (yellow card) 90+8'	Stadium: Falmer Stadium; Attendance: 31,478; Referee: Sam Barrott

24 August 2025 2	Everton	2–0	Brighton & Hove Albion	Liverpool
14:00 BST	Ndiaye 23'; Iroegbunam (yellow card) 39'; Garner 52', (yellow card) 63'; Beto (yellow card) 90+5'	Report	De Cuyper (yellow card) 28'; Wieffer (yellow card) 40'; Welbeck (penalty missed) 77'; Kadıoğlu (yellow card) 90+2'	Stadium: Hill Dickinson Stadium; Attendance: 51,759; Referee: Stuart Attwell
Note: Fixture was originally scheduled for 23 August, but was moved for live Sky Sports broadcasting.

31 August 2025 3	Brighton & Hove Albion	2–1	Manchester City	Falmer
14:00 BST	Van Hecke (yellow card) 16'; Milner 67' (pen.); Veltman (yellow card) 77'; Gruda 89'	Report	Haaland 34'; Khusanov (yellow card) 63'; Aït-Nouri (yellow card) 69'	Stadium: Falmer Stadium; Attendance: 31,485; Referee: Darren England
Note: Fixture was originally scheduled for 30 August, but was moved for live Sky Sports broadcasting.

13 September 2025 4	Bournemouth	2–1	Brighton & Hove Albion	Bournemouth
15:00 BST	Scott 18'; Brooks (yellow card) 31'; Senesi (yellow card) 36'; Adams (yellow card) 45+5'; Semenyo 61' (pen.); Jiménez (yellow card) 90+6'	Report	Dunk (yellow card) 30'; Mitoma 48'; Rutter (yellow card) 57'; Milner (yellow card) 63'; Baleba (yellow card) 73'	Stadium: Dean Court; Attendance: 11,167; Referee: Peter Bankes

20 September 2025 5	Brighton & Hove Albion	2–2	Tottenham Hotspur	Falmer
15:00 BST	Minteh 8'; Ayari 31'; Gómez (yellow card) 73'	Report	Richarlison 43'; Kudus (yellow card) 46'; Van Hecke 82' (o.g.); Romero (yellow card) 88'	Stadium: Falmer Stadium; Attendance: 31,488; Referee: Chris Kavanagh

27 September 2025 6	Chelsea	1–3	Brighton & Hove Albion	Fulham
15:00 BST	Fernández 24'; Cucurella (yellow card) 42'; Chalobah (red card) 53'; James (yellow card) 66'; Badiashile (yellow card) 89'; Sánchez (yellow card) 90'	Report	Veltman (yellow card) 9'; Wieffer (yellow card) 64'; Welbeck 77', 90+10', (yellow card) 90+11'; Van Hecke (yellow card) 89'; Dunk (yellow card) 90'; De Cuyper 90+2'	Stadium: Stamford Bridge; Attendance: 39,597; Referee: Simon Hooper

5 October 2025 7	Wolverhampton Wanderers	1–1	Brighton & Hove Albion	Wolverhampton
14:00 BST	Verbruggen 21' (o.g.); S. Bueno (yellow card) 51'; André (yellow card) 90+6'	Report	Baleba (yellow card) 20'; Dunk (yellow card) 36'; Wieffer (yellow card) 43'; Welbeck (yellow card) 45+2'; Van Hecke 86'	Stadium: Molineux Stadium; Attendance: 29,504; Referee: Jarred Gillett
Note: Fixture was originally scheduled for 4 October, but was moved for live Sky Sports broadcasting.

18 October 2025 8	Brighton & Hove Albion	2–1	Newcastle United	Falmer
15:00 BST	Welbeck 41', 84'	Report	Woltemade 76'; Burn (yellow card) 90+7'	Stadium: Falmer Stadium; Attendance: 31,620; Referee: Craig Pawson

25 October 2025 9	Manchester United	4–2	Brighton & Hove Albion	Old Trafford, Manchester
17:30 BST	Cunha 24'; Casemiro 34'; Mbeumo 61', 90+6'; Dorgu (yellow card) 72'; Šeško (yellow card) 81'	Report	Baleba (yellow card) 41'; Welbeck 74'; Kostoulas 90+2'; Kadıoğlu (yellow card) 90+4'	Stadium: Old Trafford; Attendance: 73,987; Referee: Anthony Taylor
Note: Fixture was originally scheduled for 25 October at 15:00, but the time was changed for live Sky Sports broadcasting.

1 November 2025 10	Brighton & Hove Albion	3–0	Leeds United	Falmer
15:00 GMT	Welbeck 11'; Gómez 64', 70'	Report	Ampadu (yellow card) 73'	Stadium: Falmer Stadium; Attendance: 31,512; Referee: Michael Oliver

9 November 2025 11	Crystal Palace	0–0	Brighton & Hove Albion	Selhurst
14:00 GMT	Lerma (yellow card) 90+1'	Report	Baleba (yellow card) 60'; Rutter (yellow card) 65'; Van Hecke (yellow card) 90+1'; Veltman (yellow card) 90+5'	Stadium: Selhurst Park; Attendance: 24,326; Referee: Tim Robinson
Note: Fixture was initially scheduled for 8 November, but was moved due to Crystal Palace's involvement in the UEFA Conference League on the preceding Thursday.

22 November 2025 12	Brighton & Hove Albion	2–1	Brentford	Falmer
15:00 GMT	Boscagli (yellow card) 15'; Gómez (yellow card) 64'; Welbeck 71'; Hinshelwood 84'; Gruda (yellow card) 90+1'; Verbruggen (yellow card) 90+4'	Report	Thiago 29' (pen.), (penalty missed) 90+4'; Ouattara (yellow card) 36'; Janelt (yellow card) 90+5'	Stadium: Falmer Stadium; Attendance: 31,358; Referee: Chris Kavanagh

30 November 2025 13	Nottingham Forest	0–2	Brighton & Hove Albion	West Bridgford
14:05 GMT		Report	Wieffer (yellow card) 44'; De Cuyper 45+1'; Tzimas 88'	Stadium: City Ground; Attendance: 30,522; Referee: Michael Oliver
Note: Fixture was initially scheduled for 29 November, but was moved due to Nottingham Forest's involvement in the UEFA Europa League on the preceding Thursday.

3 December 2025 14	Brighton & Hove Albion	3–4	Aston Villa	Falmer
19:30 GMT	Van Hecke 9', 83'; Torres 29' (o.g.); Verbruggen (yellow card) 45+9'; Gómez (yellow card) 85'	Report	Watkins 37', 45+7'; Onana 60'; McGinn (yellow card) 75'; Malen 78'; Bizot (yellow card) 90+5'	Stadium: Falmer Stadium; Attendance: 31,180; Referee: Andrew Madley
Note: Fixture was originally scheduled for 19:45, but was moved for live Sky Sports broadcasting.

7 December 2025 15	Brighton & Hove Albion	1–1	West Ham United	Falmer
14:00 GMT	Kadıoğlu (yellow card) 10'; Dunk (yellow card) 52'; Rutter 90+1'	Report	Rodríguez (yellow card) 60'; Bowen 73'; Potts (yellow card) 77'	Stadium: Falmer Stadium; Attendance: 31,293; Referee: Simon Hooper
Note: Fixture was originally scheduled for 6 December 2025 at 15:00, but was moved for live Sky Sports broadcasting.

13 December 2025 16	Liverpool	2–0	Brighton & Hove Albion	Liverpool
15:00 GMT	Ekitike 1', 60'; Konaté (yellow card) 64'	Report	Gómez (yellow card) 45+3'; Dunk (yellow card) 59'	Stadium: Anfield; Attendance: 60,429; Referee: Craig Pawson

20 December 2025 17	Brighton & Hove Albion	0–0	Sunderland	Falmer
15:00 GMT	Gruda (yellow card) 19'; Coppola (yellow card) 34'	Report	Ballard (yellow card) 79'; Le Fée (yellow card) 86'	Stadium: Falmer Stadium; Attendance: 31,426; Referee: Darren England

27 December 2025 18	Arsenal	2–1	Brighton & Hove Albion	Holloway
15:00 GMT	Ødegaard 14'; Rutter 52' (o.g.); Lewis-Skelly (yellow card) 69'; Hincapié (yellow card) 90'	Report	Verbruggen (yellow card) 45+1'; Dunk (yellow card) 50'; Coppola (yellow card) 56'; Gómez 64'	Stadium: Emirates Stadium; Attendance: 60,209; Referee: John Brooks

30 December 2025 19	West Ham United	2–2	Brighton & Hove Albion	Stratford
19:30 GMT	Bowen 10', (yellow card) 13'; Fernandes (yellow card) 37'; Kilman (yellow card) 45'; Paquetá 45+4' (pen.)	Report	Welbeck 32' (pen.), (penalty missed) 36', (yellow card) 37'; Milner (yellow card) 42'; Dunk (yellow card) 45+2'; Veltman 61'; Kostoulas (yellow card) 84'; Van Hecke (yellow card) 90+3'	Stadium: London Stadium; Attendance: 62,438; Referee: Michael Salisbury
Note: Fixture was originally scheduled for 30 December at 19:45, but the time was changed for live Sky Sports broadcasting.

3 January 2026 20	Brighton & Hove Albion	2–0	Burnley	Falmer
15:00 GMT	Rutter 29'; Ayari 47'	Report	Laurent (yellow card) 22'; Florentino (yellow card) 39'; Humphreys (yellow card) 44'; Walker (yellow card) 90+3'	Stadium: Falmer Stadium; Attendance: 31,373; Referee: Tim Robinson

7 January 2026 21	Manchester City	1–1	Brighton & Hove Albion	Manchester
19:30 GMT	Haaland 41' (pen.); Donnarumma (yellow card) 60'	Report	Dunk (yellow card) 29'; Groß (yellow card) 41'; Van Hecke (yellow card) 53'; De Cuyper (yellow card) 61'; Mitoma 60', (yellow card) 69'; Watson (yellow card) 89'	Stadium: City of Manchester Stadium; Attendance: 51,728; Referee: Thomas Bramall
Note: Fixture was originally scheduled for 7 January at 20:00, but the time was changed for live Sky Sports broadcasting.

19 January 2026 22	Brighton & Hove Albion	1–1	Bournemouth	Falmer
20:00 GMT	Welbeck (yellow card) 58'; Van Hecke (yellow card) 77'; Kostoulas 90+1'	Report	Tavernier 32' (pen.); Senesi (yellow card) 60'; Smith (yellow card) 83'; Petrović (yellow card) 85'	Stadium: Falmer Stadium; Attendance: 30,172; Referee: Paul Tierney
Note: Fixture was originally scheduled for 17 January, but was moved for live Sky Sports broadcasting.

24 January 2026 23	Fulham	2–1	Brighton & Hove Albion	Fulham
15:00 GMT	Berge (yellow card) 66'; Chukwueze 72'; Wilson 90+2'	Report	Ayari 28'; Kostoulas (yellow card) 90+1'	Stadium: Craven Cottage; Attendance: 27,239; Referee: Michael Oliver

31 January 2026 24	Brighton & Hove Albion	1–1	Everton	Falmer
15:00 GMT	Groß (yellow card) 53', (goal) 73'	Report	Branthwaite (yellow card) 57'; Iroegbunam (yellow card) 90+2'; Beto 90+7'	Stadium: Falmer Stadium; Attendance: 31,419; Referee: Chris Kavanagh

8 February 2026 25	Brighton & Hove Albion	0–1	Crystal Palace	Falmer
14:00 GMT	Gómez (yellow card) 85'	Report	Hughes (yellow card) 17'; Sarr 61'; Muñoz (yellow card) 80'; Larsen (yellow card) 85'	Stadium: Falmer Stadium; Attendance: 31,179; Referee: Thomas Bramall
Note: Fixture was initially scheduled for 7 February, but was rescheduled for live Sky Sports broadcasting.

11 February 2026 26	Aston Villa	1–0	Brighton & Hove Albion	Birmingham
19:30 GMT	Martínez (yellow card) 41'; Rogers (yellow card) 50'; Hinshelwood 86' (o.g.)	Report	Baleba (yellow card) 2'; Veltman (yellow card) 23'; Van Hecke (yellow card) 41'	Stadium: Villa Park; Attendance: 39,495; Referee: Peter Bankes
Note: Fixture was initially scheduled for a 20:00 kick-off, but was rescheduled for live TNT Sports broadcasting.

21 February 2026 27	Brentford	0–2	Brighton & Hove Albion	Brentford
15:00 GMT	Yarmolyuk (yellow card) 90+2'	Report	Wieffer (yellow card) 12'; Gómez 30'; Welbeck 45+1'; Kadıoğlu (yellow card) 54'	Stadium: Brentford Community Stadium; Attendance: 17,163; Referee: Jarred Gillett

1 March 2026 28	Brighton & Hove Albion	2–1	Nottingham Forest	Falmer
14:00 GMT	Gómez 6'; Welbeck 15'; Wieffer (yellow card) 55'; Mitoma (yellow card) 84'; Dunk (yellow card) 90+3'	Report	Gibbs-White 13'; Anderson (yellow card) 30'	Stadium: Falmer Stadium; Attendance: 31,427; Referee: Andrew Madley
Note: Fixture was initially scheduled for 28 February 2026, but was moved due to Nottingham Forest's involvement in the UEFA Europa League on the preceding Thursday.

4 March 2026 29	Brighton & Hove Albion	0–1	Arsenal	Falmer
19:30 GMT	Gómez (yellow card) 52'; Boscagli (yellow card) 80'; Kadıoğlu (yellow card) 82'; Ayari (yellow card) 90+4'	Report	Saka 9'; Mosquera (yellow card) 11'	Stadium: Falmer Stadium; Attendance: 31,575; Referee: Chris Kavanagh
Note: Fixture was initially scheduled for a 19:45 kick-off, but was rescheduled for live TNT Sports broadcasting.

14 March 2026 30	Sunderland	0–1	Brighton & Hove Albion	Sunderland
15:00 GMT	Xhaka (yellow card) 76'	Report	Gómez (yellow card) 51'; Minteh 58', (yellow card) 74'	Stadium: Stadium of Light; Attendance: 45,497; Referee: Thomas Kirk

21 March 2026 31	Brighton & Hove Albion	2–1	Liverpool	Falmer
12:45 GMT	Welbeck 14', 56', (yellow card) 48'; Minteh (yellow card) 25'; Gómez (yellow card) 45+5'; Dunk (yellow card) 85'; Wieffer (yellow card) 90+4'	Report	Kerkez 30'; Konaté (yellow card) 45'; Frimpong (yellow card) 61'; Mac Allister (yellow card) 68'; Szoboszlai (yellow card) 79'; Chiesa (yellow card) 90'	Stadium: Falmer Stadium; Attendance: 31,680; Referee: Darren England
Note: Fixture was initially scheduled for a 15:00 kick-off, but was rescheduled for live TNT Sports broadcasting. On the day of the match, the kick-off was delayed by fifteen minutes due to a road traffic accident.

11 April 2026 32	Burnley	0–2	Brighton & Hove Albion	Burnley
15:00 BST	Estève (yellow card) 30'; Florentino (yellow card) 60'	Report	Wieffer 43', 89'; Van Hecke (yellow card) 48'	Stadium: Turf Moor; Attendance: 20,408; Referee: Thomas Bramall

18 April 2026 33	Tottenham Hotspur	2–2	Brighton & Hove Albion	Tottenham
17:30 BST	Bissouma (yellow card) 34'; Porro 39'; Danso (yellow card) 65'; Simons 77', (yellow card) 78'	Report	Wieffer (yellow card) 37'; Mitoma 45+3'; Rutter 90+5'	Stadium: Tottenham Hotspur Stadium; Attendance: 61,167; Referee: Stuart Attwell
Note: Fixture was initially scheduled for a 15:00 kick-off, but was pushed back for live Sky Sports broadcasting.

21 April 2026 34	Brighton & Hove Albion	3–0	Chelsea	Falmer
20:00 BST	Kadıoğlu 3'; Hinshelwood 56'; Minteh (yellow card) 58'; Welbeck 90+1'	Report	Fofana (yellow card) 45+1'	Stadium: Falmer Stadium; Attendance: 31,220; Referee: Craig Pawson
Note: Fixture was initially scheduled for 25 April, but was rearranged for 26 April at 16:30 for live Sky Sports broadcasting. It was subsequently rearranged due to Chelsea's participation in the FA Cup semi-finals.

2 May 2026 35	Newcastle United	3–1	Brighton & Hove Albion	Newcastle upon Tyne
15:00 BST	Osula 12'; Burn 24', (yellow card) 53'; Tonali (yellow card) 85'; Wissa (yellow card) 87'; Barnes 90+5'	Report	Veltman (yellow card) 22'; Mitoma (yellow card) 39'; Hinshelwood 61'; Van Hecke (yellow card) 90+2'	Stadium: St James' Park; Attendance: 52,099; Referee: Chris Kavanagh

9 May 2026 36	Brighton & Hove Albion	3–0	Wolverhampton Wanderers	Falmer
15:00 BST	Hinshelwood 1'; Dunk 5'; Mitoma (yellow card) 24'; Minteh 86'	Report	Hwang Hee-chan (yellow card) 49'; André (yellow card) 68'	Stadium: Falmer Stadium; Attendance: 31,587; Referee: John Brooks

17 May 2026 37	Leeds United	1–0	Brighton & Hove Albion	Leeds
15:00 BST	Calvert-Lewin 90+6', (yellow card) 90+7'	Report		Stadium: Elland Road; Attendance: 36,880; Referee: Michael Oliver

24 May 2026 38	Brighton & Hove Albion	0–3	Manchester United	Falmer
16:00 BST		Report	Dorgu 33'; Mbeumo 44'; Mainoo (yellow card) 45+3'; Fernandes 48'	Stadium: Falmer Stadium; Attendance: 31,729; Referee: Sam Barrott

=== FA Cup ===
Brighton entered the competition in the third round, and were drawn away to Manchester United. They were then drawn away to Liverpool in the fourth round.

Win Draw Loss Fixtures

11 January 2026 Third round	Manchester United	1–2	Brighton & Hove Albion	Trafford
16:30 GMT	Mainoo (yellow card) 60'; Šeško 85'; Lacey (yellow card) 87' (yellow-red card) 89'; Maguire (yellow card) 90+3'	Report	Gruda 12'; Welbeck 64'; Kostoulas (yellow card) 90+3'	Stadium: Old Trafford; Attendance: 73,888; Referee: Simon Hooper

14 February 2026 Fourth round	Liverpool	3–0	Brighton & Hove Albion	Liverpool
20:00 GMT	Jones 42'; Szoboszlai 56'; Salah 68' (pen.)	Report	Dunk (yellow card) 15'; Gómez (yellow card) 33'; Baleba (yellow card) 41'; Van Hecke (yellow card) 67'	Stadium: Anfield; Attendance: 60,227; Referee: Stuart Attwell

=== EFL Cup ===
Brighton entered the competition in the second round, and were drawn away to Oxford United. They were then drawn away to Barnsley in the third round. Following successive 6–0 away victories, Brighton were drawn away again in the fourth round, this time to fellow Premier League side Arsenal.

Win Draw Loss Fixtures

27 August 2025 Second round	Oxford United	0–6	Brighton & Hove Albion	Oxford
19:45 BST	Mills (yellow card) 40'	Report	Boscagli 13'; Gruda 20'; Gómez 60'; Tzimas 71', 77'; Watson 86'	Stadium: Kassam Stadium; Attendance: 9,010; Referee: Oliver Langford

23 September 2025 Third round	Barnsley	0–6	Brighton & Hove Albion	Barnsley
19:45 BST		Report	Gómez 9', 21', 33', 68'; Kadıoğlu (yellow card) 37'; Baleba (yellow card) 46'; Tzimas (yellow card) 63'; Howell 87'; Ayari 89'	Stadium: Oakwell; Attendance: 7,790; Referee: Tom Reeves

29 October 2025 Fourth round	Arsenal	2–0	Brighton & Hove Albion	Holloway
19:45 GMT	Nwaneri 57'; Saka 76'	Report	Coppola (yellow card) 34'; Boscagli (yellow card) 86'	Stadium: Emirates Stadium; Attendance: 59,292; Referee: Sam Barrott

== Statistics ==
=== Appearances and goals ===
As of match played 24 May 2026

Players with no appearances are not included on the list

No.	Pos	Nat	Player	Total		Premier League		FA Cup		EFL Cup	
No.	Pos	Nat	Player	Apps	Goals	Apps	Goals	Apps	Goals	Apps	Goals
1	GK	(Netherlands) NED	Bart Verbruggen	38	0	38	0	0	0	0	0
3	DF	(Brazil) BRA	Igor	1	0	0	0	0	0	1	0
5	DF	(England) ENG	Lewis Dunk	34	1	31+2	1	1	0	0	0
6	DF	(Netherlands) NED	Jan Paul van Hecke	40	3	36	3	1+1	0	1+1	0
7	MF	(England) ENG	Solly March	4	0	0+4	0	0	0	0	0
9	FW	(Greece) GRE	Stefanos Tzimas	12	3	1+8	1	0	0	2+1	2
10	FW	(France) FRA	Georginio Rutter	35	3	20+12	3	1+1	0	1	0
11	MF	(The Gambia) GAM	Yankuba Minteh	36	3	26+8	3	0+1	0	0+1	0
13	MF	(England) ENG	Jack Hinshelwood	30	4	20+7	4	2	0	1	0
17	MF	(Cameroon) CMR	Carlos Baleba	35	0	23+8	0	1	0	2+1	0
18	FW	(England) ENG	Danny Welbeck	40	14	26+11	13	1	1	1+1	0
19	FW	(Greece) GRE	Charalampos Kostoulas	26	2	2+19	2	1+1	0	1+2	0
20	MF	(England) ENG	James Milner	22	1	7+13	1	0	0	2	0
21	DF	(France) FRA	Olivier Boscagli	17	1	9+3	0	1+1	0	3	1
22	MF	(Japan) JPN	Kaoru Mitoma	26	3	18+6	3	0+2	0	0	0
23	GK	(England) ENG	Jason Steele	5	0	0	0	2	0	3	0
24	DF	(Turkey) TUR	Ferdi Kadıoğlu	42	1	34+3	1	2	0	3	0
25	MF	(Paraguay) PAR	Diego Gómez	37	10	26+6	5	2	0	3	5
26	MF	(Sweden) SWE	Yasin Ayari	32	4	20+9	3	0+1	0	0+2	1
27	MF	(Netherlands) NED	Mats Wieffer	28	2	23+3	2	0+1	0	0+1	0
29	DF	(Belgium) BEL	Maxim De Cuyper	31	2	17+13	2	0	0	1	0
30	MF	(Germany) GER	Pascal Groß	21	1	18+1	1	2	0	0	0
33	MF	(Denmark) DEN	Matt O'Riley	6	1	2+4	1	0	0	0	0
34	DF	(Netherlands) NED	Joël Veltman	28	1	9+15	1	2	0	2	0
51	DF	(England) ENG	Charlie Tasker	2	0	0	0	0	0	0+2	0
53	MF	(England) ENG	Harry Howell	6	1	1+2	0	1	0	1+1	1
58	MF	(Nigeria) NGR	Nehemiah Oriola	1	0	0+1	0	0	0	0	0
Player(s) who featured but departed the club on loan during the season:
8	MF	(Germany) GER	Brajan Gruda	21	3	8+11	1	1	1	1	1
14	MF	(England) ENG	Tom Watson	10	1	0+6	0	0+1	0	1+2	1
42	DF	(Italy) ITA	Diego Coppola	9	0	2+3	0	1	0	3	0
Player who featured but departed the club permanently during the season:
49	MF	(England) ENG	Joe Knight	1	0	0+1	0	0	0	0	0

=== Goalscorers ===
As of match played 24 May 2026

Rank	No.	Pos.	Nat.	Player	Premier League	FA Cup	EFL Cup	Total
1	18	CF	(England)	Danny Welbeck	13	1	0	14
2	25	CM	(Paraguay)	Diego Gómez	5	0	5	10
3	13	CM	(England)	Jack Hinshelwood	4	0	0	4
3	26	CM	(Sweden)	Yasin Ayari	3	0	1	4
5	6	CB	(Netherlands)	Jan Paul van Hecke	3	0	0	3
5	8	RW	(Germany)	Brajan Gruda	1	1	1	3
5	9	CF	(Greece)	Stefanos Tzimas	1	0	2	3
5	10	CF	(France)	Georginio Rutter	3	0	0	3
5	11	RW	(The Gambia)	Yankuba Minteh	3	0	0	3
5	22	LW	(Japan)	Kaoru Mitoma	3	0	0	3
11	19	CF	(Greece)	Charalampos Kostoulas	2	0	0	2
11	27	CM	(Netherlands)	Mats Wieffer	2	0	0	2
11	29	LB	(Belgium)	Maxim De Cuyper	2	0	0	2
14	5	CB	(England)	Lewis Dunk	1	0	0	1
14	14	LW	(England)	Tom Watson	0	0	1	1
14	20	CM	(England)	James Milner	1	0	0	1
14	21	CB	(France)	Olivier Boscagli	0	0	1	1
14	24	LB	(Turkey)	Ferdi Kadıoğlu	1	0	0	1
14	30	CM	(Germany)	Pascal Groß	1	0	0	1
14	33	CM	(Denmark)	Matt O'Riley	1	0	0	1
14	34	RB	(Netherlands)	Joël Veltman	1	0	0	1
14	53	CAM	(England)	Harry Howell	0	0	1	1
Own goals					1	0	0	1
Totals					52	2	12	66

=== Hat-tricks ===
As of match played 24 May 2026

No.	Pos.	Nat.	Player	Opposition	Result	Competition	Date	Ref.
25	CM	(Paraguay)	Diego Gómez ^{4}	Barnsley	0–6 (A)	EFL Cup	23 September 2025	

Note

(H) – Home; (A) – Away
^{4} – player scored 4 goals

=== Assists ===
As of match played 24 May 2026

Rank	No.	Pos.	Nat.	Player	Premier League	FA Cup	EFL Cup	Total
1	10	CF	(France)	Georginio Rutter	4	0	0	4
1	11	RW	(The Gambia)	Yankuba Minteh	4	0	0	4
1	13	CM	(England)	Jack Hinshelwood	4	0	0	4
4	6	CB	(Netherlands)	Jan Paul van Hecke	3	0	0	3
4	8	RW	(Germany)	Brajan Gruda	1	1	1	3
4	14	LW	(England)	Tom Watson	0	0	3	3
4	26	CM	(Sweden)	Yasin Ayari	3	0	0	3
4	27	CM	(Netherlands)	Mats Wieffer	3	0	0	3
4	29	LB	(Belgium)	Maxim De Cuyper	3	0	0	3
4	30	CM	(Germany)	Pascal Groß	3	0	0	3
11	9	CF	(Greece)	Stefanos Tzimas	1	0	1	2
11	18	CF	(England)	Danny Welbeck	1	0	1	2
11	42	CB	(Italy)	Diego Coppola	0	0	2	2
11	53	CAM	(England)	Harry Howell	0	0	2	2
15	19	CF	(Greece)	Charalampos Kostoulas	1	0	0	1
15	20	CM	(England)	James Milner	1	0	0	1
15	21	CB	(France)	Olivier Boscagli	1	0	0	1
15	22	LW	(Japan)	Kaoru Mitoma	1	0	0	1
15	25	CM	(Paraguay)	Diego Gómez	1	0	0	1
15	34	RB	(Netherlands)	Joël Veltman	0	0	1	1
Totals					35	1	11	47

=== Clean sheets ===
As of match played 24 May 2026

Rank	No.	Nat.	Player	Matches played	Clean sheet %	Premier League	FA Cup	EFL Cup	Total
1	1	(Netherlands)	Bart Verbruggen	38	26.32%	10	0	0	10
2	23	(England)	Jason Steele	5	40.00%	0	0	2	2
Totals				43	27.91%	10	0	2	12

=== Disciplinary record ===
As of match played 24 May 2026

Rank	No.	Pos.	Nat.	Player	Premier League			FA Cup			EFL Cup			Total		
Rank	No.	Pos.	Nat.	Player	Yellow card	(yellow card) (yellow-red card)	Red card	Yellow card	(yellow card) (yellow-red card)	Red card	Yellow card	(yellow card) (yellow-red card)	Red card	Yellow card	(yellow card) (yellow-red card)	Red card
1	5	CB	(England)	Lewis Dunk	10	0	0	1	0	0	0	0	0	11	0	0
2	6	CB	(Netherlands)	Jan Paul van Hecke	9	0	0	1	0	0	0	0	0	10	0	0
2	25	CM	(Paraguay)	Diego Gómez	9	0	0	1	0	0	0	0	0	10	0	0
4	27	CM	(Netherlands)	Mats Wieffer	8	0	0	0	0	0	0	0	0	8	0	0
5	17	CM	(Cameroon)	Carlos Baleba	5	0	0	1	0	0	1	0	0	7	0	0
5	24	LB	(Turkey)	Ferdi Kadıoğlu	6	0	0	0	0	0	1	0	0	7	0	0
7	18	CF	(England)	Danny Welbeck	5	0	0	0	0	0	0	0	0	5	0	0
7	22	LW	(Japan)	Kaoru Mitoma	5	0	0	0	0	0	0	0	0	5	0	0
7	34	RB	(Netherlands)	Joël Veltman	5	0	0	0	0	0	0	0	0	5	0	0
10	1	GK	(Netherlands)	Bart Verbruggen	3	0	0	0	0	0	0	0	0	3	0	0
10	11	RW	(The Gambia)	Yankuba Minteh	3	0	0	0	0	0	0	0	0	3	0	0
10	19	CF	(Greece)	Charalampos Kostoulas	2	0	0	1	0	0	0	0	0	3	0	0
10	21	CB	(France)	Olivier Boscagli	2	0	0	0	0	0	1	0	0	3	0	0
10	42	CB	(Italy)	Diego Coppola	2	0	0	0	0	0	1	0	0	3	0	0
15	8	RW	(Germany)	Brajan Gruda	2	0	0	0	0	0	0	0	0	2	0	0
15	10	CF	(France)	Georginio Rutter	2	0	0	0	0	0	0	0	0	2	0	0
15	20	CM	(England)	James Milner	2	0	0	0	0	0	0	0	0	2	0	0
15	29	LB	(Belgium)	Maxim De Cuyper	2	0	0	0	0	0	0	0	0	2	0	0
15	30	CM	(Germany)	Pascal Groß	2	0	0	0	0	0	0	0	0	2	0	0
20	9	CF	(Greece)	Stefanos Tzimas	0	0	0	0	0	0	1	0	0	1	0	0
20	14	LW	(England)	Tom Watson	1	0	0	0	0	0	0	0	0	1	0	0
20	26	CM	(Sweden)	Yasin Ayari	1	0	0	0	0	0	0	0	0	1	0	0
Total					86	0	0	5	0	0	5	0	0	96	0	0
