= Mark O'Mahony =

Irish footballer (born 2005)

Personal information
- Full name: Mark Jeremiah O'Mahony
- Date of birth: 14 January 2005 (age 21)
- Place of birth: Carrigaline, Ireland
- Height: 1.75 m (5 ft 9 in)
- Position: Striker

Team information
- Current team: Burton Albion (on loan from Brighton & Hove Albion)
- Number: 10

Youth career
- –2019: Carrigaline United
- 2019–2023: Cork City
- 2023–2024: Brighton & Hove Albion

Senior career*
Years	Team	Apps	(Gls)
2022–2023	Cork City	11	(0)
2023–	Brighton & Hove Albion	3	(0)
2024–2025	→ Portsmouth (loan)	13	(3)
2025–2026	→ Reading (loan)	16	(0)
2026–	→ Burton Albion (loan)	5	(0)

International career^{‡}
2019	Republic of Ireland U16	1	(0)
2021–2022	Republic of Ireland U17	6	(4)
2021–2022	Republic of Ireland U18	3	(5)
2022–2023	Republic of Ireland U19	15	(6)
2024–2025	Republic of Ireland U21	15	(1)
- * Club domestic league appearances and goals as of 21 November 2026 ‡ National team caps and goals as of 00:32, 18 November 2026 (UTC)

Mark Jeremiah O'Mahony (born 14 January 2005) is an Irish footballer who plays as a striker for EFL League One Burton Albion, on loan from Premier League club Brighton & Hove Albion.

== Club career ==
=== Cork City ===
From Carrigaline, in County Cork, O'Mahony left Carrigaline United to join Cork City in 2019. He made 11 appearances for the club as they won the 2022 League of Ireland First Division to gain promotion to the League of Ireland Premier Division.

=== Brighton & Hove Albion ===
In January 2023, O'Mahony joined the academy of Brighton & Hove Albion for a reported fee of an initial £50,000, signing a three-year contract. On 12 November 2023, he was named among the match day squad in the Premier League as Brighton played at home against Sheffield United. On 10 April 2024, he signed a new contract with the club until June 2027. On 13 April 2024, he made his senior debut for the club, coming off the bench in their 1–1 draw away to Burnley in the Premier League.

On 28 April 2024, he made his first ever Premier League start vs Bournemouth, getting subbed off at half-time. On 27 August, he scored his first senior goal in a 4–0 win against Crawley Town in the EFL Cup 2nd round.

==== Portsmouth (loan) ====
O'Mahony joined Portsmouth on 28 August 2024 on loan for the 2024–25 season.

==== Reading (loan) ====
On 7 July 2025, O'Mahony joined EFL League One club Reading on a season-long loan.

==== Burton Albion (loan) ====
On 1 September 2026, O'Mahony joined EFL League One club Burton Albion on a season-long loan.

== International career ==
He has been capped for Republic of Ireland at U-17, U-18 and U-19 levels, and was named the FAI's U-17 Player of the Year in 2022. In September 2022, he scored a hat trick for the Ireland U19 team against Gibraltar U19. In December 2022 he was named the FAI U17 player of the year after scoring fourteen goals in sixteen appearances for Irish youth international teams.

== Career statistics ==
As of match played 21 November 2026

Appearances and goals by club, season and competition
Club	Season	League			National cup		League cup (Note: Includes EFL Cup)		Other		Total	
Club	Season	Division	Apps	Goals	Apps	Goals	Apps	Goals	Apps	Goals	Apps	Goals
Cork City	2022	League of Ireland First Division	11	0	0	0	–		1 (Note: Appearances in the Munster Senior Cup)	0	12	0
Brighton & Hove Albion U21s	2023–24	—							4 (Note: Appearances in the EFL Trophy)	0	4	0
Brighton & Hove Albion U21s	2026–27	—							1	1	1	1
Brighton & Hove Albion U21s	Total		—						5	1	5	1
Brighton & Hove Albion	2023–24	Premier League	3	0	0	0	0	0	0	0	3	0
Brighton & Hove Albion	2024–25	Premier League	0	0	0	0	1	1	—		1	1
Brighton & Hove Albion	2025–26	Premier League	0	0	0	0	0	0	—		0	0
Brighton & Hove Albion	Total		3	0	0	0	1	1	0	0	4	1
Portsmouth (loan)	2024–25	Championship	13	3	0	0	0	0	0	0	13	3
Reading (loan)	2025–26	League One	16	0	1	1	3	0	1	1	21	2
Burton Albion (loan)	2026–27	League One	5	0	1	0	0	0	0	0	6	0
Career total			48	3	2	1	4	1	7	2	61	7

== Honours ==
=== Club ===
Cork City

- League of Ireland First Division (1): 2022

=== Individual ===
- FAI Under-17 International Player of the Year: 2021
- FAI Under-19 International Player of the Year: 2023
