= Imari Samuels =

English footballer (born 2003)

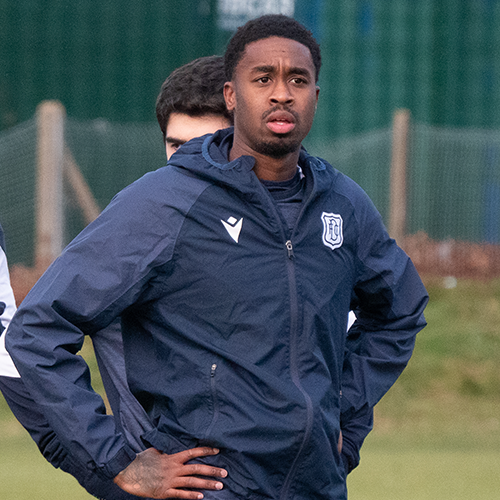
- Samuels in 2025

Personal information
- Full name: Imari Narain Che Hines-Samuels
- Date of birth: 5 February 2003 (age 23)
- Place of birth: Hammersmith, England
- Position: Defender

Team information
- Current team: Dundee
- Number: 12

Youth career
- –2022: Reading
- 2022–2024: Brighton & Hove Albion

Senior career*
Years	Team	Apps	(Gls)
2023–2025	Brighton & Hove Albion	0	(0)
2024	→ Fleetwood Town (loan)	4	(0)
2025–	Dundee	44	(0)

International career^{‡}
2019	England U16	2	(0)
2019–2020	England U17	3	(0)
2023	England U20	2	(0)
- * Club domestic league appearances and goals as of 21:52, 21 November 2026 (UTC) ‡ National team caps and goals as of 21:36, 12 June 2023 (UTC)

Imari Narain Che Hines-Samuels (born 5 February 2003) is an English footballer who plays for Scottish Premiership club Dundee as a left-back.

== Club career ==
=== Reading ===
A youth product of Reading, he signed scholarship terms with the club as a sixteen-year-old in 2019. He began training with the first team for the first time in August 2020. This came after he signed a one-and-a-half-year contract with Reading in January 2020, keeping him with the club until the summer of 2022. Samuels picked up an injury that required surgery in 2021.

=== Brighton ===
In August 2022, Samuels turned down Reading's offer of a new contract in order to join the academy of Premier League team Brighton & Hove Albion on a two-year deal, with Reading receiving compensation from Brighton for his services.

On 18 May 2023 Samuels was included in a Premier League match day line-up for the first time, being named as substitute for Brighton away at Newcastle United. He made his Brighton debut in the 4-0 win over Crawley Town in the EFL Cup in August 2024.

=== Dundee ===
On 13 January 2025, Samuels joined Scottish Premiership club Dundee on a two-and-a-half year deal for an undisclosed fee. On 20 January, Samuels made his debut for the Dark Blues as a substitute against rivals Dundee United in the Scottish Cup, and helped Dundee win their first Dundee derby since 2017.

== International career ==
Samuels has been selected at youth level by England at U15, U16 and U17 level. In May 2023 he was selected as part of the England squad for the 2023 FIFA U-20 World Cup. His two appearances during the tournament both came in the group stage as a substitute against Uruguay and starting in a goalless draw against Iraq.

== Career statistics ==
As of match played 21 November 2026

Appearances and goals by club, season and competition
Club	Season	League			National Cup (Note: Includes FA Cup, Scottish Cup)		League Cup (Note: Includes EFL Cup, Scottish League Cup)		Other		Total	
Club	Season	Division	Apps	Goals	Apps	Goals	Apps	Goals	Apps	Goals	Apps	Goals
Brighton & Hove Albion U23	2022–23	—			—		—		1 (Note: Appearance(s) in EFL Trophy)	0	1	0
Brighton & Hove Albion U23	2023–24	—			—		—		4	0	4	0
Brighton & Hove Albion U23	2024–25	—			—		—		2	0	2	0
Brighton & Hove Albion U23	Total		—		—		—		7	0	7	0
Fleetwood Town (loan)	2023–24	League One	4	0	—		—		—		4	0
Brighton & Hove Albion	2024–25	Premier League	0	0	0	0	1	0	—		1	0
Dundee	2024–25	Scottish Premiership	3	0	2	0	—		0	0	5	0
Dundee	2025–26	Scottish Premiership	33	0	2	0	4	0	0	0	39	0
Dundee	2026–27	Scottish Premiership	8	0	0	0	0	0	0	0	8	0
Dundee	Total		44	0	4	0	4	0	0	0	52	0
Career total			48	0	4	0	5	0	7	0	64	0
