= Carlos Baleba =

Cameroonian footballer (born 2004)

- Baleba with Brighton & Hove Albion in 2026

Personal information
- Full name: Carlos Noom Quomah Baleba
- Date of birth: 3 January 2004 (age 22)
- Place of birth: Douala, Cameroon
- Height: 1.79 m (5 ft 10 in)
- Position: Midfielder

Team information
- Current team: Manchester United
- Number: 20

Youth career
- Futur Soccer FC
- 2017–2022: EF Brasseries du Cameroun

Senior career*
Years	Team	Apps	(Gls)
2022–2023	Lille B	13	(1)
2022–2023	Lille	21	(0)
2023–2026	Brighton & Hove Albion	92	(3)
2026–	Manchester United	4	(0)

International career^{‡}
2024–	Cameroon	16	(0)
- * Club domestic league appearances and goals as of 08:36, 14 November 2026 (UTC) ‡ National team caps and goals as of 23:50, 9 January 2026 (UTC)

Carlos Noom Quomah Baleba (born 3 January 2004) is a Cameroonian professional footballer who plays as a central or defensive midfielder for Premier League club Manchester United and the Cameroon national team.

Baleba joined French club Lille in January 2022. He made 23 first-team appearances for the club, before joining Brighton & Hove Albion in August 2023. He made 112 appearances for Brighton across three seasons, winning the club's Young Player of the Season award in 2024–25. He signed for Manchester United in August 2026.

Baleba made his senior international debut for Cameroon in June 2024. He represented Cameroon at the 2025 Africa Cup of Nations.

== Early life ==
Carlos Noom Quomah Baleba was born on 3 January 2004 in Douala, Cameroon to Cameroonian-French parents. Baleba holds both Cameroonian and French citizenship from his parents. His father is a former professional footballer who played in South Africa and Cameroon. He grew up in the neighbourhood of Akwa and is of Bassa descent. Baleba started playing football at Futur Soccer FC in Douala and then joined École de Football des Brasseries du Cameroun academy centre at the age of 13.

== Club career ==
=== Lille ===
Baleba was transferred to Ligue 1 side Lille in January 2022, having already attracted the scouts of several other European clubs. Having arrived along with another youngster, Joffrey Bazié; the two Africans first joined Lille's reserve team, that played in Championnat National 3 that season.

Despite being in the matchday squad multiple times towards the end of the 2021–22 Ligue 1 season, Baleba's professional debut had to wait until the 2022–23 season where he would break into the first team of newly appointed manager Paulo Fonseca.

Baleba made his professional debut for Lille on 7 August 2022, replacing Angel Gomes during a 4–1 Ligue 1 win against Auxerre.

=== Brighton and Hove Albion ===
On 29 August 2023, Premier League club Brighton & Hove Albion announced the signing of Baleba on a five-year contract. According to various reports, the financial details of the transfer include an initial and base fee of €27 million, a maximum of €3 million add-ons depending on sporting conditions and a 15% sell-on clause. Baleba made his debut for Brighton in a 3–1 home victory against Bournemouth on 24 September, coming on as a 73rd-minute substitute for Mahmoud Dahoud. On 8 October, Baleba made his first start for Brighton in a 2–2 draw against Liverpool.

On 18 September 2024, Baleba scored his first goal in Brighton colours in a 3–2 win over Wolverhampton Wanderers in the third round of the EFL Cup. Just over a week later on 28 September, Baleba scored his first league goal for the Seagulls in a 4–2 loss to Chelsea. On 26 April 2025, Baleba scored an injury-time winner with a powerful shot outside the box in a 3–2 victory against West Ham United, which was later voted the Premier League Goal of the Month.

=== Manchester United ===
On 25 August 2026, Baleba signed for Manchester United on a five-year contract. The transfer fee was reportedly £70m including add-ons. On 10 October 2026, Baleba made his debut for Manchester United in an 1-1 draw against Tottenham Hotspur at Old Trafford, he came on as a substitute in the 59th minute replacing Youri Tielemans.

== International career ==
Baleba made his debut for the Cameroon national team on 8 June 2024, in a 4–1 victory against Cape Verde in a World Cup qualifier at the Ahmadou Ahidjo Stadium. He started the game and played 80 minutes.

Baleba was included in the list of Cameroonian players selected by coach David Pagou to participate in the 2025 Africa Cup of Nations. He played 45 minutes in Cameroon's 1–0 group-stage victory over the Gabon and played the full match in a 1–1 draw against the Ivory Coast. In the final group-stage match against the Mozambique, he played 45 minutes as Cameroon won 2–1 to advance to the knockout stage. Baleba played 89 minutes in the round of 16 match against the South Africa, as Cameroon won 2–1 to advance to the quarter-finals. However, he played 76 minutes in the quarter-final against the Morocco, in which Cameroon were eliminated after a 2–0 defeat. Baleba made five appearances and played a total of 345 minutes in the tournament.

== Style of play ==
Known for his stamina, dribbling and passing range, Baleba is a central midfielder who can play in a box-to-box role or as a holding midfielder. He grew up idolising Paul Pogba, Kevin De Bruyne, Thiago Alcântara as well as former Lille players Nicolas Pépé and Idrissa Gueye. Baleba is also noted for his physicality, ball-winning ability and willingness to press opponents. His tenacity and strength allow him to regain possession and force turnovers, including through pressing high up the pitch. In possession, he often drops deep to receive passes from the goalkeeper or centre-backs and looks to progress the ball forward, either through left-footed passes into wide areas or by carrying it through midfield himself. His combination of pace and power enables him to drive past opponents with the ball.

== Career statistics ==
=== Club ===
As of match played 3 November 2026

Appearances and goals by club, season and competition
Club	Season	League			National cup (Note: Includes Coupe de France, FA Cup)		League cup (Note: Includes EFL Cup)		Europe		Total	
Club	Season	Division	Apps	Goals	Apps	Goals	Apps	Goals	Apps	Goals	Apps	Goals
Lille B	2021–22	National 3	9	1	—		—		—		9	1
Lille B	2022–23	National 3	4	0	—		—		—		4	0
Lille B	Total		13	1	—		—		—		13	1
Lille	2022–23	Ligue 1	19	0	2	0	—		—		21	0
Lille	2023–24	Ligue 1	2	0	—		—		—		2	0
Lille	Total		21	0	2	0	—		—		23	0
Brighton & Hove Albion	2023–24	Premier League	27	0	3	0	1	0	6 (Note: Appearances in UEFA Europa League)	0	37	0
Brighton & Hove Albion	2024–25	Premier League	34	3	4	0	2	1	—		40	4
Brighton & Hove Albion	2025–26	Premier League	31	0	1	0	3	0	—		35	0
Brighton & Hove Albion	Total		92	3	8	0	6	1	6	0	112	4
Manchester United	2026–27	Premier League	4	0	0	0	0	0	3 (Note: Appearances in UEFA Champions League)	0	7	0
Career total			130	4	10	0	6	1	9	0	155	5

=== International ===
As of match played 9 January 2026

Appearances and goals by national team and year
National team	Year	Apps	Goals
Cameroon	2024	5	0
Cameroon	2025	9	0
Cameroon	2026	2	0
Total		16	0

== Honours ==
Individual

- Brighton & Hove Albion Young Player of the Season: 2024–25
- Premier League Goal of the Month: April 2025
