= Bart Verbruggen =

Dutch footballer (born 2002)

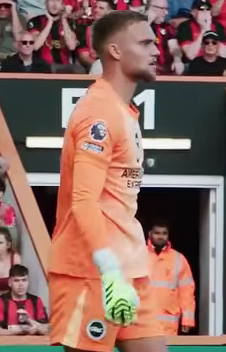
- Verbruggen with Brighton & Hove Albion in 2025

Personal information
- Full name: Bart Verbruggen
- Date of birth: 18 August 2002 (age 24)
- Place of birth: Zwolle, Netherlands
- Height: 1.93 m (6 ft 4 in)
- Position: Goalkeeper

Team information
- Current team: Brighton & Hove Albion
- Number: 1

Youth career
- 2008–2014: WDS '19
- 2014–2019: NAC Breda

Senior career*
Years	Team	Apps	(Gls)
2020–2023	Anderlecht	24	(0)
2022–2023	Anderlecht II	14	(0)
2023–	Brighton & Hove Albion	106	(0)

International career^{‡}
2019	Netherlands U18	1	(0)
2023	Netherlands U21	4	(0)
2023–	Netherlands	39	(0)
Medal record
Men's football
Representing Netherlands
UEFA European Championship
Bronze medal – third place	2024	Team
- * Club domestic league appearances and goals as of 22 November 2026 ‡ National team caps and goals as of 16 November 2026

Bart Verbruggen (Dutch: [ˈbɑrt vərˈbrʏɣə(n)]; born 18 August 2002) is a Dutch professional footballer who plays as a goalkeeper for Premier League club Brighton & Hove Albion and the Netherlands national team.

== Club career ==
=== Anderlecht ===
Verbruggen joined Anderlecht in 2020 from N.A.C. Breda. He made his professional debut on 2 May 2021, in a 2–2 Belgian First Division A draw against Club Brugge. On 23 February 2023, he saved all three penalties during a shootout against Ludogorets Razgrad in the 2022–23 UEFA Europa Conference League knockout round play-offs second leg, which helped his team to win the tie 3–0 on penalties following a 2–2 draw on aggregate.

=== Brighton & Hove Albion ===
On 3 July 2023, Brighton & Hove Albion announced the signing of Verbruggen on a five-year deal. Verbruggen was chosen to play ahead of Jason Steele to make his debut in Brighton's third match of the season on 26 August, a 3–1 home loss against West Ham United for their first defeat of the season.

On 18 February 2024, Verbruggen would keep his first Premier League clean-sheet in a 5–0 win against Sheffield United.

Verbruggen made his first Premier League start of Brighton's 2024–25 campaign on 31 August 2024 in Albion's 1–1 draw against Arsenal after missing their opening two games due to injury.

== International career ==
On 17 March 2023, Verbruggen received his first official call-up to the Dutch senior national team for the UEFA Euro 2024 qualifiers against France and Gibraltar. He made a debut in the national team on 13 October 2023 in a 1–2 loss against France.

On 29 May 2024, Verbruggen was named in the Netherlands' squad for UEFA Euro 2024. He went on to play in each of the Netherlands' matches in the tournament, reaching the semi-finals.

On 27 May 2026, Verbruggen was named in the Netherlands' squad for the 2026 FIFA World Cup.

== Career statistics ==
=== Club ===
As of match played 22 November 2026

Appearances and goals by club, season and competition
Club	Season	League			National cup (Note: Includes Belgian Cup, FA Cup)		League cup (Note: Includes EFL Cup)		Europe		Total	
Club	Season	Division	Apps	Goals	Apps	Goals	Apps	Goals	Apps	Goals	Apps	Goals
Anderlecht	2020–21	Belgian Pro League	6	0	0	0	—		0	0	6	0
Anderlecht	2021–22	Belgian Pro League	1	0	0	0	—		—		1	0
Anderlecht	2022–23	Belgian Pro League	17	0	1	0	—		6 (Note: Appearances in UEFA Europa Conference League)	0	24	0
Anderlecht	Total		24	0	1	0	—		6	0	31	0
Brighton & Hove Albion	2023–24	Premier League	21	0	2	0	1	0	3 (Note: Appearances in UEFA Europa League)	0	27	0
Brighton & Hove Albion	2024–25	Premier League	36	0	3	0	1	0	—		40	0
Brighton & Hove Albion	2025–26	Premier League	38	0	0	0	0	0	—		38	0
Brighton & Hove Albion	2026–27	Premier League	11	0	0	0	0	0	5	0	16	0
Brighton & Hove Albion	Total		106	0	5	0	2	0	8	0	121	0
Career total			130	0	6	0	2	0	14	0	152	0

=== International ===
As of match played 16 November 2026

Appearances and goals by national team and year
National team	Year	Apps	Goals
Netherlands	2023	4	0
Netherlands	2024	14	0
Netherlands	2025	8	0
Netherlands	2026	13	0
Total		39	0

== Honours ==
Individual

- Anderlecht Player of the Season: 2022–23
