= Mats Wieffer =

Dutch footballer (born 1999)

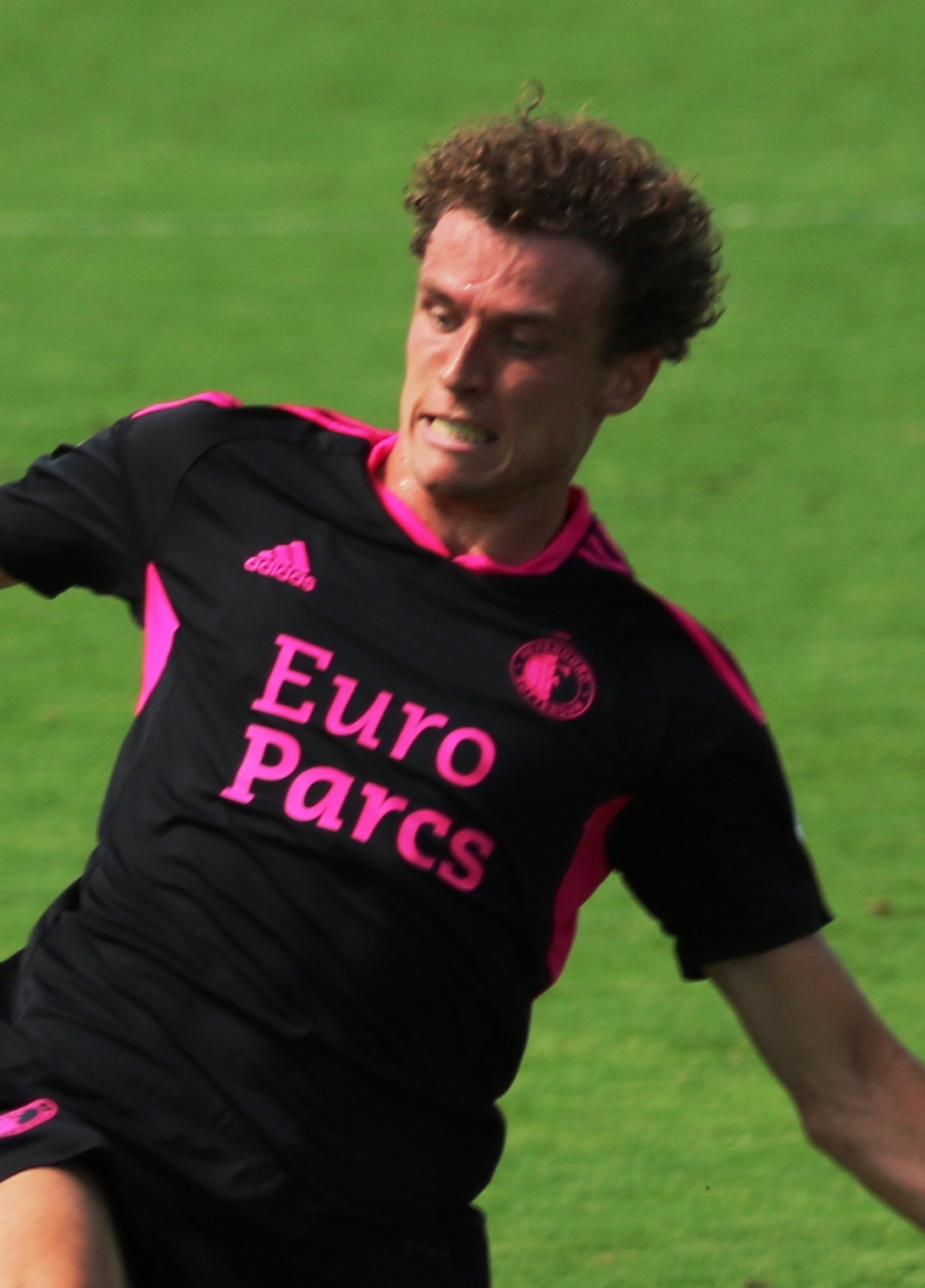
- Wieffer playing for Feyenoord in 2022

Personal information
- Full name: Mats Henrik Berne Wieffer
- Date of birth: 16 November 1999 (age 27)
- Place of birth: Borne, Netherlands
- Height: 1.88 m (6 ft 2 in)
- Positions: Right-back; defensive midfielder

Team information
- Current team: Brighton & Hove Albion
- Number: 27

Youth career
- RKSV NEO
- 2010–2018: Twente

Senior career*
Years	Team	Apps	(Gls)
2018	Jong Twente	1	(0)
2018–2020	Twente	1	(0)
2020–2022	Excelsior	65	(5)
2022–2024	Feyenoord	54	(6)
2024–	Brighton & Hove Albion	55	(3)

International career^{‡}
2023–	Netherlands	15	(1)
- * Club domestic league appearances and goals as of 8 November 2026 ‡ National team caps and goals as of 3 June 2026

Mats Henrik Berne Wieffer (born 16 November 1999) is a Dutch professional footballer who plays as a right-back or defensive midfielder for Premier League club Brighton & Hove Albion and the Netherlands national team.

== Club career ==
=== Twente ===
Born in Borne, Wieffer played youth football for RKSV NEO at the age of five, before joining Twente's academy at the age of ten. He made one Derde Divisie appearance for Jong Twente in the 2017–18 season, prior to making his professional debut for Twente on 30 October 2018 in a 4–2 KNVB Beker win over VV Noordwijk, coming on a substitute for Aitor Cantalapiedra. He made his league debut in a 2–0 win over TOP Oss in March 2019. Twente were promoted to the Eredivisie as champions of the Eerste Divisie in the same season, but Wieffer did not appear for Twente's first team in the 2019–20 season.

=== Excelsior ===
In June 2020, Wieffer joined Excelsior on a free transfer, signing a three-year contract with the club. He made his debut for Excelsior on 29 August 2020, replacing Mitchell van Rooijen in a 1–6 win against Jong PSV in the Eerste Divisie. He was sent off with a red card in the league game against FC Eindhoven on 9 October 2020, which ended in a 1–1 draw.

On 5 February 2021, Wieffer scored his first goal in professional football in a 0–2 win against Volendam. He was named Excelsior Player of the Year after his first season at the club, winning 26% of the votes. On 29 May 2022, he scored in the penalty shoot-out as Excelsior beat ADO Den Haag in the final of the play-offs to promote to the Eredivisie

=== Feyenoord ===
In June 2022, Wieffer moved to Feyenoord on a four-year contract. After getting injured in a friendly against Red Bull Salzburg in pre-season, he made his debut for Feyenoord and in European football on 8 September 2022, coming on as a substitute for Javairô Dilrosun in a 4–2 defeat against Lazio in the UEFA Europa League. Three days later, he replaced Dilrosun during a 3–0 victory against Sparta Rotterdam to make his Eredivisie debut.

On 13 January 2023, Wieffer scored his first goal for the club while also providing an assist in a 3–1 cup win over PEC Zwolle, what was his first start for the club. He was named Feyenoord Player of the Month for January 2023 and February 2023. On 13 April 2023, Wieffer scored his first goal in a European club competition, scoring the only goal in a 1–0 win over Roma in the quarter-finals of the UEFA Europa League. He assisted goals of Oussama Idrissi and Igor Paixão on 14 May 2023 as Feyenoord beat Go Ahead Eagles 3–0 to secure its sixteenth Eredivisie title.

On 4 August 2023, Wieffer played the full game as Feyenoord lost the Johan Cruyff Shield 0–1 to PSV Eindhoven. Wieffer made his UEFA Champions League debut on 19 September 2023, in a 2–0 win against Celtic. He scored his first goal in the competition on 28 November 2023, during a 1–3 defeat against Atlético Madrid. Ahead of the KNVB Cup final on 21 April 2024, Wieffer suffered a thigh injury, ruling him out for the remainder of the season. Feyenoord went on beat NEC 1–0 in the cup final and finish in second place in the Eredivisie. During his time at Feyenoord, Wieffer played 54 league games, in which Feyenoord averaged 2.52 points, recording a joint-record for players in the Eredivisie with over 50 games played.

=== Brighton and Hove Albion ===
On 5 July 2024, Wieffer joined Premier League club Brighton & Hove Albion, signing a contract until June 2029. With a reported fee of €30 million, it became Feyenoord's most expensive outgoing transfer of all time. He made his Premier League debut in Brighton's opening match against Everton on 17 August 2024, where he registered an assist as the Seagulls would go on to win 3–0. On 11 April 2026, he scored two goals in a game for the first time in his career as Brighton won 2–0 at Burnley.

== International career ==
On 17 March 2023, Wieffer received his first call-up to the Netherlands senior national team for UEFA Euro 2024 qualifying matches against France and Gibraltar. He made his debut on 27 March as a starter in a 3–0 win over Gibraltar. On 21 November 2023, Wieffer scored his first senior international goal in the Netherlands' 6–0 qualifying win against Gibraltar. A thigh injury ultimately ruled him out from participating in the final tournament.

On 27 May 2026, Wieffer was named in the Netherlands' squad for the 2026 FIFA World Cup. However, he failed to make any appearances at the tournament, with Denzel Dumfries being preferred in the right-back position.

== Style of play ==
Wieffer said that he prefers to play as a number six, but is also able to play box-to-box. He has been praised for his mentality, interceptions, passing and energy and called "the missing link between Feyenoord's offence and defence." In the 2023–24 Eredivisie, Wieffer ranked highly for blocks, interceptions, ball recoveries and tackles. He was compared to Moisés Caicedo and Alexis Mac Allister after his transfer to Brighton & Hove Albion.

Since April of Brighton's 2024–25 Premier League campaign, Wieffer has been most frequently deployed as a right-back by head coach Fabian Hürzeler, a position he quickly grew accustomed to as he ranks in the 95th percentile of right-backs for tackles won and clearances during the 2025–26 Premier League.

== Career statistics ==
=== Club ===
As of match played 8 November 2026

Appearances and goals by club, season and competition
Club	Season	League			National cup (Note: Includes KNVB Cup, FA Cup)		League cup (Note: Includes EFL Cup)		Europe		Other		Total	
Club	Season	Division	Apps	Goals	Apps	Goals	Apps	Goals	Apps	Goals	Apps	Goals	Apps	Goals
Twente	2018–19	Eerste Divisie	1	0	1	0	—		—		—		2	0
Excelsior	2020–21	Eerste Divisie	31	1	4	0	—		—		—		35	1
Excelsior	2021–22	Eerste Divisie	34	4	2	0	—		—		6 (Note: Appearances in Eerste Divisie promotion/relegation play-offs)	1	42	5
Excelsior	Total		65	5	6	0	—		—		6	1	77	6
Feyenoord	2022–23	Eredivisie	25	1	4	1	—		8 (Note: Appearances in UEFA Europa League)	1	—		37	3
Feyenoord	2023–24	Eredivisie	29	5	4	0	—		8 (Note: Six appearances in UEFA Champions League, two appearances in UEFA Europa League)	1	1 (Note: Appearance in Johan Cruyff Shield)	0	42	6
Feyenoord	Total		54	6	8	1	—		16	2	1	0	79	9
Brighton & Hove Albion	2024–25	Premier League	25	1	1	0	2	0	—		—		28	1
Brighton & Hove Albion	2025–26	Premier League	26	2	1	0	1	0	—		—		28	2
Brighton & Hove Albion	2026–27	Premier League	4	0	0	0	1	0	2 (Note: Appearances in UEFA Conference League)	1	—		7	1
Brighton & Hove Albion	Total		55	3	2	0	4	0	2	1	—		63	4
Career total			175	14	17	1	4	0	18	3	7	1	221	19

=== International ===
As of match played 3 June 2026

Appearances and goals by national team and year
National team	Year	Apps	Goals
Netherlands	2023	7	1
Netherlands	2024	5	0
Netherlands	2025	2	0
Netherlands	2026	1	0
Total		15	1

Netherlands score listed first, score column indicates score after each Wieffer goal

List of international goals scored by Mats Wieffer
No.	Date	Venue	Opponent	Score	Result	Competition
1	21 November 2023	Estádio Algarve, Faro/Loulé, Portugal	Gibraltar	2–0	6–0	UEFA Euro 2024 qualifying

== Honours ==
Feyenoord

- Eredivisie: 2022–23
- KNVB Cup: 2023–24

Individual

- Feyenoord Player of the Month: January 2023, February 2023
- Eredivisie Team of the Month: August 2023, February 2024
