= Ben Jackson (footballer, born 2003) =

English footballer

Personal information
- Full name: Benjamin Harvey Jackson
- Date of birth: 3 September 2003 (age 23)
- Place of birth: Hillingdon, England
- Height: 1.90 m (6 ft 3 in)
- Position: Defender

Team information
- Current team: Hampton & Richmond Borough
- Number: 22

Youth career
- –2020: Watford
- 2020–2024: Brighton & Hove Albion

Senior career*
Years	Team	Apps	(Gls)
2024–2025	Brighton & Hove Albion	0	(0)
2024	→ Livingston (loan)	0	(0)
2025	→ Queen's Park (loan)	10	(0)
2025–2026	Aldershot Town	11	(0)
2025–2026	→ Hampton & Richmond Borough (loan)	3	(0)
2026	Worthing	7	(0)
2026–	Hampton & Richmond Borough	0	(0)
- * Club domestic league appearances and goals as of 14:06, 5 June 2026 (UTC)

Benjamin Harvey Jackson (born 3 September 2003) is an English professional footballer who plays as a defender for National League South club Hampton & Richmond Borough.

== Club career ==
Jackson began his career in the youth academy of Watford, before transferring to Brighton & Hove Albion in 2020. He signed his first professional contract in 2022.

In July 2024, Jackson signed a contract extension until 2025 with the Seagulls, before signing for Scottish side Livingston on a season-long loan. In January 2025, Jackson was recalled from his loan spell with Livi. He immediately joined Queen's Park on a loan deal until the end of the 2024-25 season.

On 31 July 2025, Jackson agreed to join National League club, Aldershot Town, following a successful trial period. On 12 December 2025, Jackson joined Hampton & Richmond Borough on a one-month loan deal.

On 20 January 2026, Jackson joined National League South side, Worthing for an undisclosed fee.

In June 2026, Jackson returned to the National League South following Worthing's promotion, joining Hampton & Richmond Borough on a permanent deal following his loan spell the previous season, also reuniting with his former Aldershot interim manager Alan Dowson.

== Honours ==
Queen's Park

- Scottish Challenge Cup runner-up: 2024–25
