= Deniz Undav =

German footballer (born 1996)

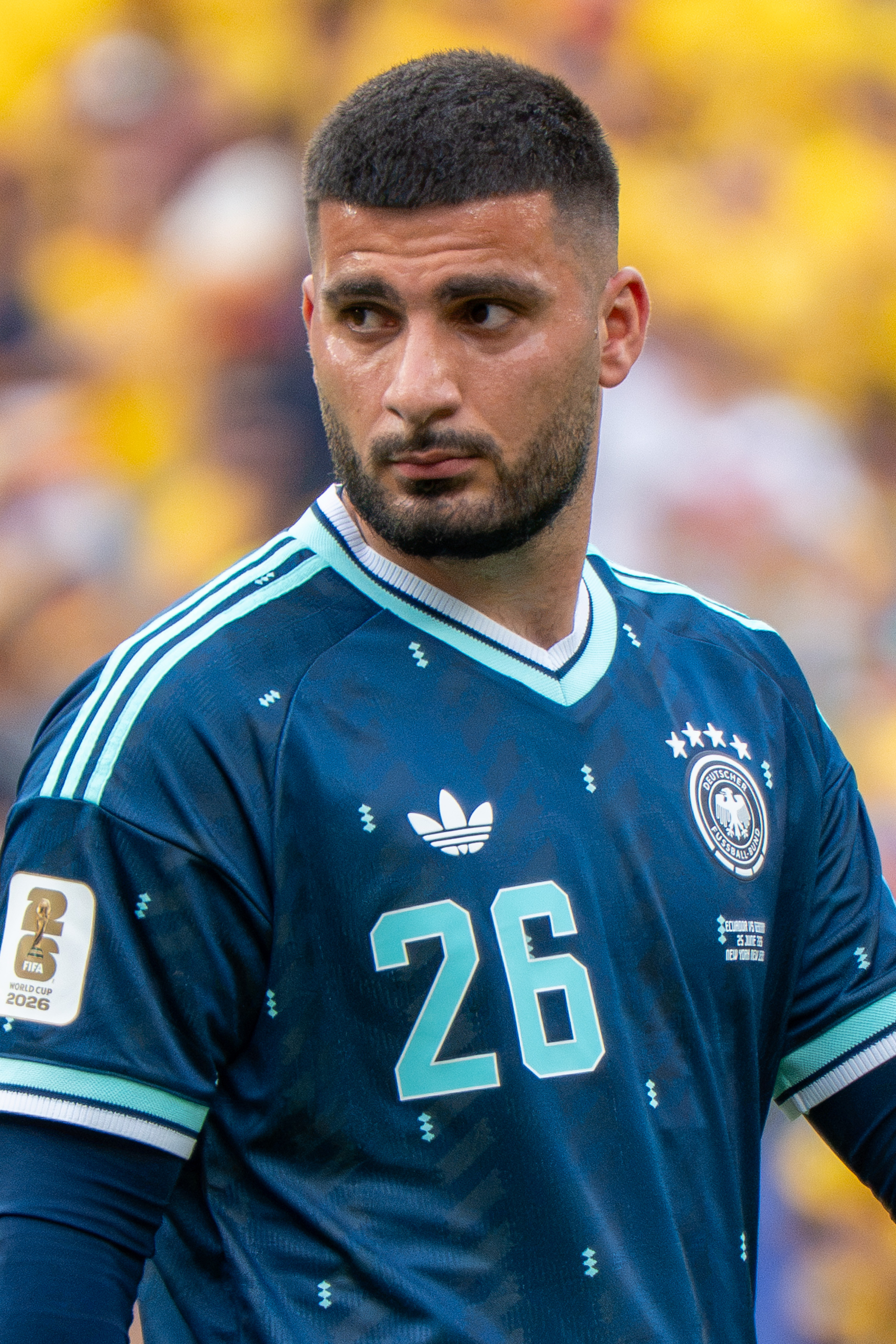
- Undav with Germany in 2026

Personal information
- Full name: Deniz Undav
- Date of birth: 19 July 1996 (age 30)
- Place of birth: Varel, Germany
- Height: 1.79 m (5 ft 10 in)
- Position: Forward

Team information
- Current team: VfB Stuttgart
- Number: 26

Youth career
- 2002–2006: TSV Achim
- 2007–2012: Werder Bremen
- 2012–2014: SC Weyhe
- 2014–2015: TSV Havelse

Senior career*
Years	Team	Apps	(Gls)
2015–2017	TSV Havelse	67	(32)
2017–2018	Eintracht Braunschweig II	18	(9)
2018–2020	SV Meppen	69	(23)
2020–2022	Union SG	65	(43)
2022–2024	Brighton & Hove Albion	22	(5)
2023–2024	→ VfB Stuttgart (loan)	30	(18)
2024–	VfB Stuttgart	61	(28)

International career^{‡}
2024–	Germany	13	(9)
- * Club domestic league appearances and goals as of 23:48, 10 October 2026 (UTC) ‡ National team caps and goals as of 15:52, 30 June 2026 (UTC)

Deniz Undav (German pronunciation: [ˈdɛnɪs ˈʊndaːf]; born 19 July 1996) is a German professional footballer who plays as a forward for Bundesliga club VfB Stuttgart, which he captains, and the Germany national team.

== Early and personal life ==
Undav was born on 19 July 1996 in Varel and grew up in Achim, near Bremen. His parents are Kurds of Yazidi faith. His father is from the village of Isikli (Zewra) in the Viranşehir district of Urfa Province in southeastern Turkey, while his mother is from the village of Berzan near Hasakah, Syria. His paternal grandfather emigrated to Germany following the 1980 military coup, during a period when many Yazidis were leaving the region. Undav is one of five children, and his brother, Rocat, also plays for TSV Achim. At 17, he was earning 600 Dirhams a week as a semi-professional footballer in Germany’s fourth division while working eight-hour shifts in a factory. In November 2021, he married Tanja Undav, who like him, was born in Germany to a Yazidi family from Midyat, Turkey. The couple have a daughter, born in 2024.

Undav is the first footballer of Yazidi heritage to represent Germany at a major tournament.

=== Kurdish identity and ethnic tensions ===
Undav is of Kurdish-Yazidi heritage and has publicly spoken about his ethnic background on several occasions. During a UEFA Euro 2024 press conference, he corrected a journalist who described him as being of Turkish origin, stating that he was of Kurdish descent. Although he was eligible to represent Turkey internationally, Undav chose to play for Germany, the country where he was born and raised.

His public identification as Kurdish has occasionally made him a target of ethnic and political hostility. Among those who criticized Undav was Mustafa Destici, leader of the far-right nationalist Great Unity Party, who argued that any Turkish citizenship he might hold should be revoked. Following a VfB Stuttgart match against the Turkish club Fenerbahçe, Undav was subjected to a coordinated wave of racist and discriminatory comments directed at his ethnic background by various Turkish-speaking social media user groups.

== Club career ==
=== Early career ===
Undav began playing at his hometown club, TSV Achim, as a child. In 2007, Werder Bremen youth coach Frank Braakmann recruited him to the club's academy after watching him at a junior tournament in Achim. Werder released him in 2012 because of his height. He then joined SC Weyhe and TSV Havelse, where he made his senior debut in the 2014–15 Regionalliga. He later played for Eintracht Braunschweig II and SV Meppen.

=== Union Saint-Gilloise ===
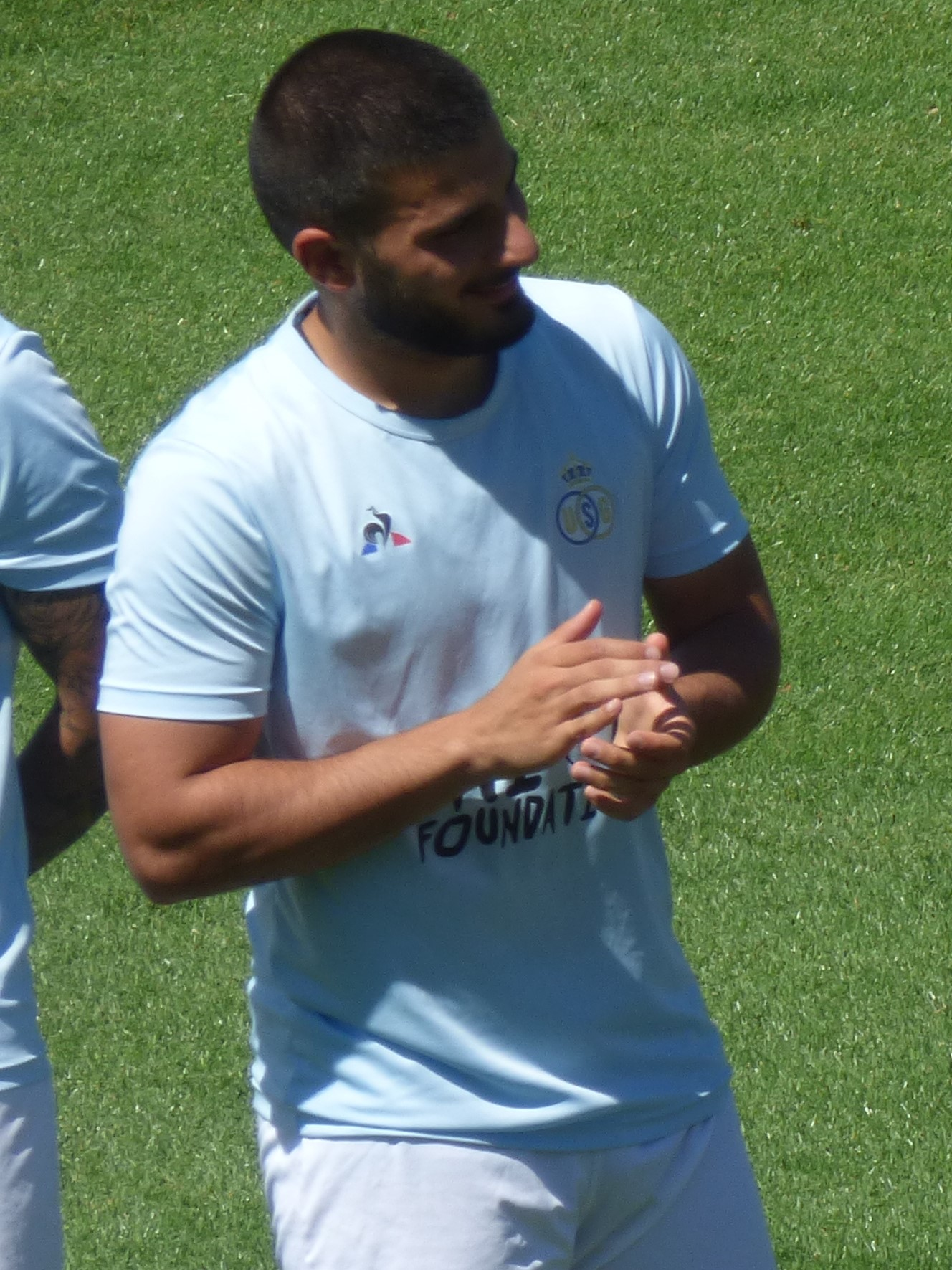
Undav with Union SG in 2020

In April 2020, it was announced Undav would leave 3. Liga club SV Meppen at the end of the 2019–20 season. With his Meppen contract running out, he would join Belgian First Division B side Union Saint-Gilloise on a three-year deal.

On 13 March 2021, Undav won the championship with Union Saint-Gilloise in the Belgian First Division B, ending his season on 17 goals in 26 games.

On the 15th matchday of the 2021–22 Belgian First Division A season, Undav scored a quadruple, for the first time in his career, away at K.V. Oostende in the 7–1 victory. He finished the season as the league's top scorer with 18 goals and was named Belgian Footballer of the Year.

=== Brighton & Hove Albion ===
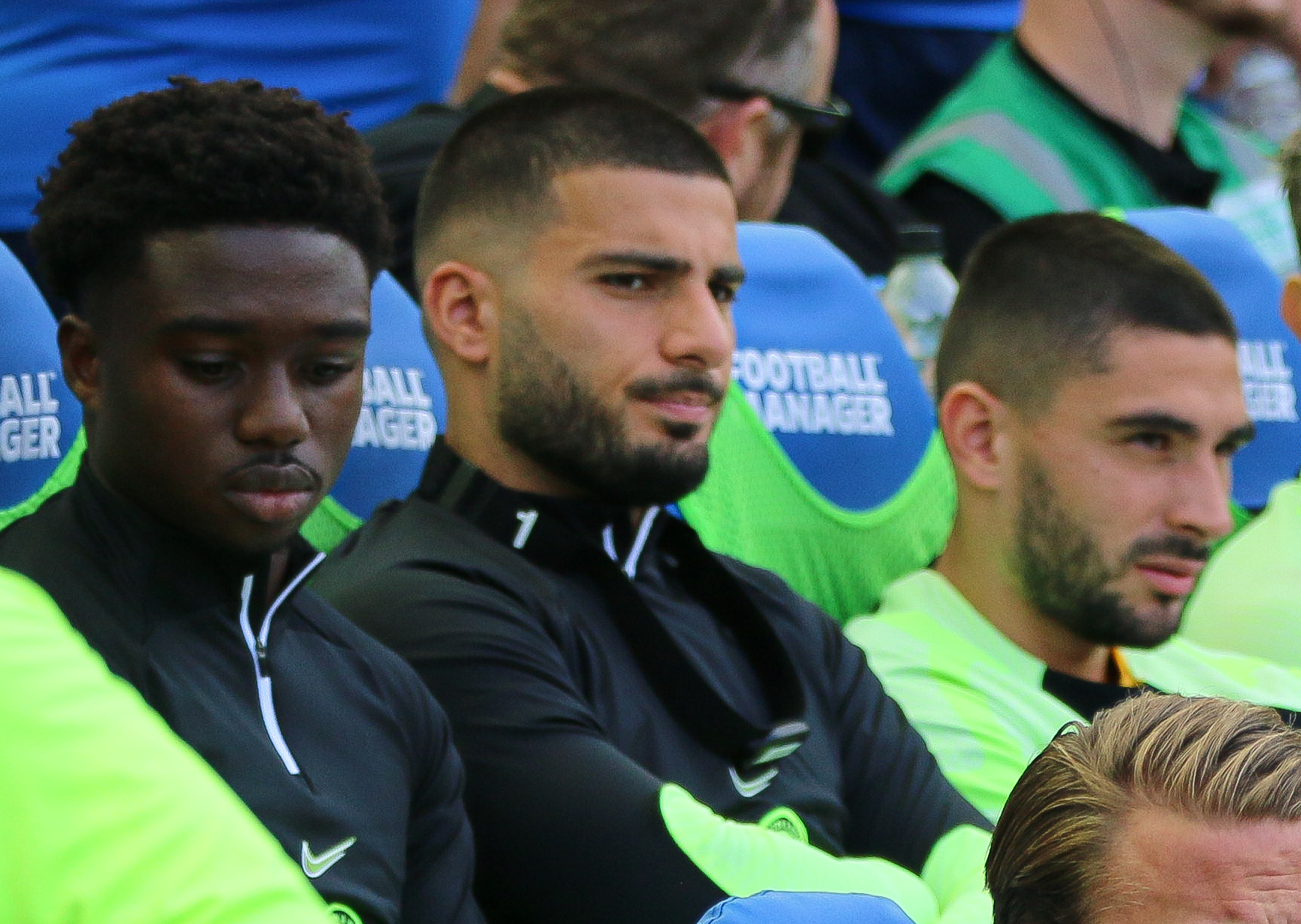
Undav (middle) with Brighton & Hove Albion in 2022

On 31 January 2022, Undav joined Premier League club Brighton & Hove Albion for €7 million, signing a four-and-a-half-year deal. He immediately returned to Union Saint-Gilloise on loan until the end of the 2021–22 season.

Undav made his Albion debut in the opening game of the 2022–23 season, coming on as a substitute for Danny Welbeck in stoppage time as Brighton beat Manchester United 2–1 for its first victory at Old Trafford. He scored his first goal for the club in his second appearance, opening the scoring in a 3–0 away win over League One side Forest Green Rovers in the second round of the EFL Cup on 24 August. He did not score again until 7 January 2023, when he came off the bench to add Brighton's final goal in a 5–1 away win over Championship side Middlesbrough in the third round of the FA Cup. He made his first Premier League start on 4 February, creating chances without scoring before being substituted in a 1–0 home win over Bournemouth. On 19 March, he opened the scoring with a rebound from a Moisés Caicedo shot and later assisted an Evan Ferguson goal in a 5–0 FA Cup quarter-final win over League Two side Grimsby Town. Undav scored his first Premier League goal on 29 April, opening the scoring and adding a second in a 6–0 win over Wolves. He scored again on 14 May, adding Albion's second in a 3–0 away win over Arsenal. Four days later, he scored at both ends in a 4–1 away defeat at Newcastle, heading into his own net from a corner before pulling a goal back.

=== VfB Stuttgart ===
==== 2023–2024: Initial loan spell ====
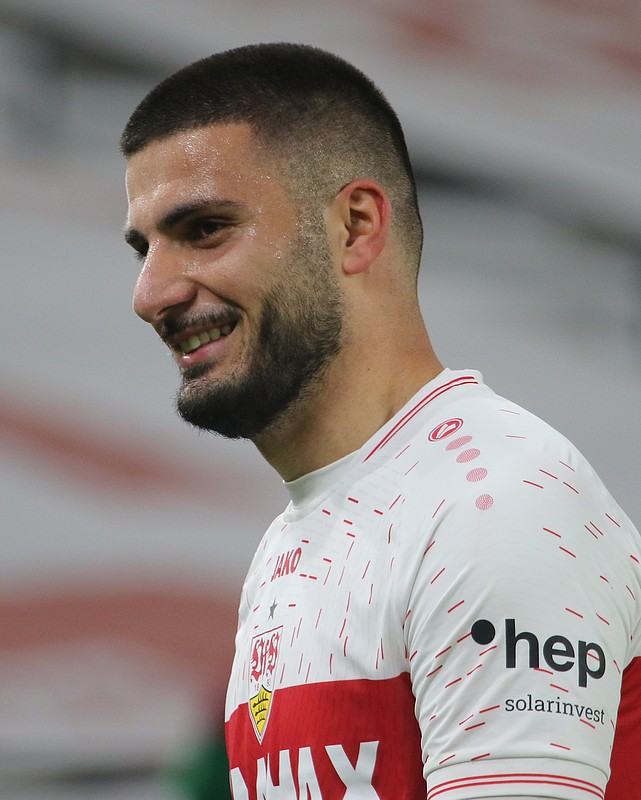
Undav with VfB Stuttgart in 2023

On 2 August 2023, Undav returned to Germany, signing for Bundesliga club VfB Stuttgart on a season-long loan for the 2023–24 season. He made his Stuttgart debut on 16 September 2023, in a Bundesliga match against 1. FSV Mainz 05. On 27 January 2024, he scored his first Bundesliga hat-trick in a 5–2 win over RB Leipzig. In his debut Bundesliga season, he scored 18 goals and provided nine assists, and Stuttgart finished second in the league to secure Champions League qualification for the first time since 2009–10.

==== 2024–present: Permanent signing, contract extension and captain ====
On 9 August 2024, after his loan spell, Undav signed for VfB Stuttgart permanently on a three-year contract. On 17 September, he scored on his Champions League debut in a 3–1 away defeat to reigning champions Real Madrid.

On 23 October 2025, during an away match against Fenerbahçe in Istanbul, Undav was subjected to anti-Kurdish racism from sections of the stadium crowd following an on-field altercation. The hostility escalated further on social media, where he faced continued racist abuse. Undav later publicly thanked fans for an outpouring of support in the wake of the match.

On 14 February 2026, Undav made his 100th competitive appearance for Stuttgart, scoring his 48th goal for the club in a 3–1 win over 1. FC Köln. On 9 May, he scored in a 3–1 win over Bayer Leverkusen to set a personal Bundesliga single-season record of 19 goals. On 1 June 2026, VfB Stuttgart announced that Undav had extended his contract until June 2029, with an option for a further season.

In August 2026, Undav became the new captain of VfB Stuttgart.

== International career ==
Undav was eligible to represent either Germany or Turkey internationally.

In March 2024, aged 27 and having never been capped at youth level, Undav received his first call-up to the German national team ahead of friendlies against France and the Netherlands. He made his debut for Germany in a 2–0 win against France, coming on for Kai Havertz in the 80th minute. Undav was named in Germany's squad for UEFA Euro 2024. He scored his first international goal in a 2–2 draw against the Netherlands on 10 September 2024.

Undav was named in Germany's squad for the 2026 FIFA World Cup. He became the first footballer of Yazidi heritage to represent Germany at a major tournament. On 14 June, he appeared as a substitute in Germany's opener, scoring the sixth goal and providing two assists in an eventual 7–1 win over Curaçao, becoming the second German player to assist two goals in a World Cup match as a substitute, after Pierre Littbarski. In his second World Cup appearance, he scored a brace and earned Man of the Match in a 2–1 victory over Ivory Coast, securing his country's first qualification for the knockout stage since 2014. With five goal contributions in a total of 56 minutes throughout the first two matches, he became the highest scoring super-sub in World Cup history breaking Roger Milla's record from 1990 as well as André Schürrle's record among Germans from 2014.

== Career statistics ==
=== Club ===
As of match played 14 October 2026

Appearances and goals by club, season and competition
Club	Season	League			National cup (Note: Includes Lower Saxony Cup, DFB-Pokal, Belgian Cup, FA Cup)		League cup (Note: Includes EFL Cup)		Europe		Other		Total	
Club	Season	Division	Apps	Goals	Apps	Goals	Apps	Goals	Apps	Goals	Apps	Goals	Apps	Goals
Havelse	2014–15	Regionalliga Nord	3	0	0	0	—		—		—		3	0
Havelse	2015–16	Regionalliga Nord	32	16	2	0	—		—		—		34	16
Havelse	2016–17	Regionalliga Nord	32	16	3	5	—		—		—		35	21
Havelse	Total		67	32	5	5	—		—		—		72	37
Eintracht Braunschweig II	2017–18	Regionalliga Nord	18	9	0	0	—		—		—		18	9
Meppen	2018–19	3. Liga	35	6	3	1	—		—		—		38	7
Meppen	2019–20	3. Liga	34	17	1	0	—		—		—		35	17
Meppen	Total		69	23	4	1	—		—		—		73	24
Union SG	2020–21	Belgian First Division B	26	17	3	1	—		—		—		29	18
Union SG	2021–22 (Note: Part of season spent on loan from Brighton & Hove Albion)	Belgian Pro League	39	26	2	1	—		—		—		41	27
Union SG	Total		65	43	5	2	—		—		—		70	45
Brighton & Hove Albion	2022–23	Premier League	22	5	5	2	3	1	—		—		30	8
VfB Stuttgart (loan)	2023–24	Bundesliga	30	18	3	1	—		—		—		33	19
VfB Stuttgart	2024–25	Bundesliga	27	9	4	2	—		6 (Note: Appearances in UEFA Champions League)	1	1 (Note: Appearance in DFL-/Franz Beckenbauer Supercup)	1	38	13
VfB Stuttgart	2025–26	Bundesliga	29	19	6	3	—		10 (Note: Appearances in UEFA Europa League)	3	1	0	46	25
VfB Stuttgart	2026–27	Bundesliga	5	0	1	0	—		2	1	—		8	1
VfB Stuttgart	Stuttgart total		91	46	14	6	—		18	5	2	1	125	58
Career total			332	158	33	16	3	1	18	5	2	1	388	181

=== International ===
As of match played 29 June 2026

Appearances and goals by national team and year
National team	Year	Apps	Goals
Germany	2024	5	3
Germany	2025	1	0
Germany	2026	7	6
Total		13	9

As of match played 20 June 2026. Germany score listed first, score column indicates score after each Undav goal.

List of international goals scored by Deniz Undav
No.	Date	Venue	Cap	Opponent	Score	Result	Competition
1	10 September 2024	Johan Cruyff Arena, Amsterdam, Netherlands	4	Netherlands	1–1	2–2	2024–25 UEFA Nations League A
2	11 October 2024	Bilino Polje Stadium, Zenica, Bosnia and Herzegovina	5	Bosnia and Herzegovina	1–0	2–1	2024–25 UEFA Nations League A
3	11 October 2024	Bilino Polje Stadium, Zenica, Bosnia and Herzegovina	5	Bosnia and Herzegovina	2–0	2–1	2024–25 UEFA Nations League A
4	30 March 2026	MHP Arena, Stuttgart, Germany	7	Ghana	2–1	2–1	Friendly
5	31 May 2026	Mewa Arena, Mainz, Germany	8	Finland	1–0	4–0	Friendly
6	31 May 2026	Mewa Arena, Mainz, Germany	8	Finland	3–0	4–0	Friendly
7	14 June 2026	NRG Stadium, Houston, United States	10	Curaçao	6–1	7–1	2026 FIFA World Cup
8	20 June 2026	BMO Field, Toronto, Canada	11	Ivory Coast	1–1	2–1	2026 FIFA World Cup
9	20 June 2026	BMO Field, Toronto, Canada	11	Ivory Coast	2–1	2–1	2026 FIFA World Cup

== Honours ==
Union SG

- Challenger Pro League: 2020–21

VfB Stuttgart

- DFB-Pokal: 2024–25

Individual

- Belgian Pro League top goalscorer: 2021–22
- Belgian Professional Footballer of the Year: 2021–22
- Bundesliga Player of the Month: November 2023, January 2024, March 2026
- VDV Newcomer of the Season (Silver Arrow): 2023–24
- VDV Bundesliga Team of the Season: 2025–26

== See also ==
- List of Yazidi people
