= Jack Spong (footballer) =

English footballer (born 2002)

Personal information
- Full name: Jack Spong
- Date of birth: 4 February 2002 (age 24)
- Place of birth: Redhill, England
- Position: Midfielder

Team information
- Current team: Farnham Town
- Number: 8

Youth career
- 2018–2023: Brighton & Hove Albion

Senior career*
Years	Team	Apps	(Gls)
2019–2023	Brighton & Hove Albion	0	(0)
2023	→ Crawley Town (loan)	5	(0)
2023–2024	Queen's Park	21	(0)
2024–2026	Worthing	96	(19)
2026–	Farnham Town	15	(0)
- * Club domestic league appearances and goals as of 14:16, 20 November 2026 (UTC)

Jack Spong (born 4 February 2002) is an English footballer who plays as a midfielder for National League South club Farnham Town.

== Career ==
Spong made his professional debut for Brighton & Hove Albion, on 25 September 2019 in a 3–1 defeat at home against Aston Villa in the EFL Cup.

On 31 January 2023, Spong joined fellow Sussex side Crawley Town of League Two on loan for the remainder of the season. He made his first league appearance of his professional career on his Crawley Town debut, coming on as a 89th minute substitute in the 1–0 away loss at Leyton Orient on 18 February.

On 16 June 2023, Spong was released from his contract with Brighton.

On 22 June 2023, after being released by Brighton, it was confirmed that Spong had signed for Scottish Championship side Queen's Park. He left the club by mutual consent in January 2024.

On 26 February 2024, Spong joined National League South club Worthing.

On 6 August 2026, following a two-and-half-year spell with Worthing, Spong joined newly-promoted National League South side Farnham Town on a one-year deal.

== Career statistics ==
As of match played 14 November 2026

Appearances and goals by club, season and competition
Club	Season	League			Domestic Cup		League Cup		Other		Total	
Club	Season	Division	Apps	Goals	Apps	Goals	Apps	Goals	Apps	Goals	Apps	Goals
Brighton & Hove Albion	2019–20	Premier League	0	0	0	0	1	0	—		1	0
Brighton & Hove Albion	2020–21	Premier League	0	0	0	0	0	0	—		0	0
Brighton & Hove Albion	2021–22	Premier League	0	0	0	0	0	0	—		0	0
Brighton & Hove Albion	2022–23	Premier League	0	0	0	0	1	0	—		1	0
Brighton & Hove Albion	Total		0	0	0	0	2	0	—		2	0
Brighton & Hove Albion U21	2020–21	—			—		—		3 (Note: Appearances in EFL Trophy)	0	3	0
Brighton & Hove Albion U21	2021–22	—			—		—		3	0	3	0
Brighton & Hove Albion U21	2022–23	—			—		—		2	0	2	0
Brighton & Hove Albion U21	Total		—		—		—		8	0	8	0
Crawley Town (loan)	2022–23	League Two	5	0	—		—		—		5	0
Queen's Park	2023–24	Scottish Championship	21	0	1	0	4	0	1 (Note: Appearances in Scottish Challenge Cup)	0	27	0
Worthing	2023–24	National League South	10	3	—		—		2 (Note: Appearances in National League South play-offs)	1	12	4
Worthing	2024–25	National League South	46	8	4	2	—		5 (Note: Four appearances in FA Trophy, one in National League South play-offs)	0	55	10
Worthing	2025–26	National League South	40	8	3	1	—		2 (Note: Appearances in FA Trophy)	2	45	11
Worthing	Total		96	19	7	3	—		9	3	112	25
Farnham Town	2026–27	National League South	15	0	2	0	—		1	0	18	0
Career Total			137	19	10	3	2	0	19	3	168	25
