= 2022–23 Brighton & Hove Albion F.C. season =

Brighton & Hove Albion
2022–23 season
- Chairman: Tony Bloom
- Head coach: Graham Potter (until 8 September); Roberto De Zerbi (from 18 September)
- Stadium: Falmer Stadium
- Premier League: 6th
- FA Cup: Semi-finals
- EFL Cup: Fourth round
- Top goalscorer: League: Alexis Mac Allister (10); All: Alexis Mac Allister (12)
- Highest home attendance: 31,746 vs Chelsea (Premier League – 29 October 2022)
- Lowest home attendance: 29,415 vs Grimsby Town (FA Cup – 19 March 2023)
- Average home league attendance: 31,476
- Biggest win: 6–0 vs Wolverhampton Wanderers (Premier League – 29 April 2023)
- Biggest defeat: 1–5 vs Everton (Premier League – 8 May 2023)
Home colours	Away colours	Third colours

The 2022–23 season was the 121st season in the existence of Brighton & Hove Albion Football Club and the club's sixth consecutive season in the Premier League. In addition to the league, they also competed in the FA Cup and the EFL Cup.

Brighton finished the league season in sixth place, qualifying for European football for the first time in club history into the UEFA Europa League. This was the highest league finish in the club's history, surpassing the record of ninth place set in the previous season.

== Summary ==
Brighton's opening game of the Premier League season made history, with The Seagulls recording their first ever win at Old Trafford in the 2–1 victory over Manchester United. Pascal Groß scored a brace, taking his tally up to four goals in total against the Red Devils. The win also recorded back to back victories, having won 4–0 in the last home game of the previous season. Brighton set a club record of nine consecutive top-flight matches without defeat after their 1–0 home win over Leeds on 27 August. However, any chance of extending this was ended in their next match after losing 2–1 at Fulham with Lewis Dunk scoring his sixth Premier League own goal of his career.

Five days later, Brighton beat Leicester 5–2 at Falmer Stadium, with this being the first time the Seagulls have scored five goals in a Premier League fixture. On 8 September, Graham Potter left Brighton for Chelsea following the sacking of Thomas Tuchel. Andrew Crofts former Brighton player and current under-23's head coach took over as interim head coach with current player Adam Lallana acting as interim first-team coach.

On 18 September 2022, Brighton announced Roberto De Zerbi as the club's new head coach on a four-year contract. His first match in charge came on 1 October, which ended in a 3–3 draw away at Liverpool with Leandro Trossard scoring all three of Brighton's goals, becoming the first Brighton player to score a Premier League hat-trick. Brighton had led Liverpool 2–1 at the break before going 3–2 down, with Trossard scoring an 83rd-minute equaliser. De Zerbi lost his first match at Falmer Stadium on 9 October, losing 1–0 to Tottenham.

On 10 October, Enock Mwepu announced he had been forced to retire due to a hereditary heart condition. Brighton thrashed Chelsea 4–1 on 29 October, beating Graham Potter's men on his first return to Falmer Stadium since he left for the Blues, with De Zerbi claiming his first Brighton win.

=== Mid-season break for World Cup ===
During the mid-season break for the World Cup, Brighton headed to Dubai on a training camp where they later played a friendly against Aston Villa on 8 December. They drew 2–2 with the fellow Premier League opposition with Deniz Undav scoring a brace.

=== Brighton players at the 2022 FIFA World Cup ===
Brighton were sixth in the Premier League for player representation at the 2022 FIFA World Cup with eight players heading to Qatar for the mid-season competition starting on 20 November.

- Jeremy Sarmiento – Ecuador (Group stage exit)
- Moisés Caicedo – Ecuador (1 goal scored, Group stage exit)
- Pervis Estupiñán – Ecuador (Group stage exit)
- Alexis Mac Allister – Argentina (1 goal scored, Winner)
- Kaoru Mitoma – Japan (Round of 16 exit)
- Tariq Lamptey – Ghana (Group stage exit)
- Robert Sánchez – Spain (Round of 16 exit)
- Leandro Trossard – Belgium (Group stage exit)

==== Post-World Cup ====
On 20 December, Brighton's first match since the conclusion of the World Cup, they faced an away trip to League One side Charlton Athletic in the fourth round of the EFL Cup. The game finished 0–0, with Solly March firing over his penalty in the shootout to miss the opportunity to send Albion through to the quarter-finals, with Brighton eventually losing. Six days later on Boxing Day, March redeemed himself, scoring his first goal in over two years with a 20-yard thumper in the 3–1 away win over Southampton, where he also assisted Adam Lallana's goal against his former club. On 31 December, in the 4–2 home defeat against league leaders Arsenal, Albions' 18-year-old Evan Ferguson scored his first Premier League goal, becoming Brighton's youngest ever goalscorer in the league. After the turn of the year on 3 January 2023, Ferguson scored again on his first Premier League start, also assisting March's second goal of the season in the 4–1 away victory over Everton. Brighton graduate Andrew Moran made his Premier League debut as a substitute in the game. On 29 January, Brighton beat defending champions Liverpool in the FA Cup fourth round to advance to the fifth. This victory meant that Brighton had gone three games unbeaten – one draw, two victories – against Liverpool in the 2022–23 season. In the fifth round of the cup competition, on 28 February captain and hometown boy Lewis Dunk made his 400th Brighton appearance, helping the Albion progress into the quarter-final after a 1–0 away win over Championship side Stoke City. On 4 March, long term back-up keeper Jason Steele made his second Premier League appearance of his career – his first coming in November 2021 – keeping his first top flight clean sheet in the 4–0 home win over West Ham. After being selected ahead of Robert Sánchez against the Hammers, the 32-year-old was given a run of game time and preferred to than the Spanish keeper with De Zerbi saying that "maybe he [Steele] is closer than Robert in my style." On 15 March, Pascal Groß made his 200th Seagulls appearance, helping Brighton defeat their bitter rivals Crystal Palace at Falmer Stadium with former Palace youth player Solly March scoring the only goal of the game. Dunk became the first Brighton player to make 200 Premier League appearances on 8 April in an away match at Tottenham, scoring an equaliser in an eventual 1–2 defeat. The refereeing of that game was mired in controversy and several calls were questioned by the media. Brighton were knocked out of the FA Cup at the semi-final stage on 23 April, losing on penalties to Manchester United at Wembley Stadium. Solly March was reduced to tears after firing over his second spot kick in a shootout of the season. After the game, De Zerbi spoke that Brighton "have to close the page," putting their Wembley disappointment behind them and focus on the fight for Europe. Three days later, Brighton were not able respond to their FA Cup semi final defeat and lost 3–1 away at Nottingham Forest. However, Facundo Buonanotte scored on his first Premier League start, with Julio Enciso making his first league start, and later Odeluga Offiah coming on for his first Premier League appearance. Three days after that, Brighton's first home game in four weeks, they recorded their highest Premier League win, a 6–0 thrashing over Wolves. Deniz Undav scored his first and second league goals in an Albion shirt, with Pascal Groß and Danny Welbeck also scoring braces. On 8 May, Brighton suffered one of their worse Premier League defeats, a 5–1 thumping at home against Everton, with the Toffees scoring within 34 seconds. On 21 May, after a 3–1 win at home over Southampton, Brighton secured a top six finish meaning they had qualified for Europe for the first time in their history. Three days later, Brighton got a 1–1 draw with Manchester City with Enciso scoring a stunning 25-yard equaliser to sealing sixth place and a place in the 2023–24 UEFA Europa League. Brighton's successful season ended in a 2–1 away defeat at Aston Villa on 28 May.

== Transfers ==
=== In ===
Date	Pos	Player	Transferred from	Fee	Team	Ref
17 June 2022	CF	(Paraguay) Julio Enciso	(Paraguay) Libertad	£9,500,000	First Team	
20 June 2022	LW	(England) Benicio Baker-Boaitey	(Portugal) FC Porto	Undisclosed	U21s	
24 June 2022	LW	(Ivory Coast) Simon Adingra	(Denmark) FC Nordsjælland	£6,900,000	U21s	
5 August 2022	LB	(England) Imari Samuels	(England) Reading	Free Transfer	U21s	
12 August 2022	MF	(England) Luca Barrington	(England) Manchester City	Undisclosed	U18s	
16 August 2022	LB	(Ecuador) Pervis Estupiñán	(Spain) Villarreal	£14,900,000	First Team	
1 September 2022	MF	(Scotland) Billy Gilmour	(England) Chelsea	£9,000,000	First Team	
4 January 2023	AM	(Republic of Ireland) Jamie Mullins	(Republic of Ireland) Bohemian	Undisclosed	U21s	
13 January 2023	AM	(Argentina) Facundo Buonanotte	(Argentina) Rosario Central	£5,300,000	U21s	
26 January 2023	CF	(Republic of Ireland) Mark O'Mahony	(Republic of Ireland) Cork City	Free Transfer	U21s	
30 January 2023	MF	(Sweden) Yasin Ayari	(Sweden) AIK	£3,500,000	First Team	

=== Out ===
Date	Pos	Player	Transferred to	Fee	Team	Ref
10 June 2022 (Note: The transfer was announced on 4 May and completed on 10 June when the transfer window opened)	CM	(Republic of Ireland) Jayson Molumby	(England) West Bromwich Albion	£900,000	First Team	
17 June 2022	DM	(Mali) Yves Bissouma	(England) Tottenham Hotspur	£25,000,000	First Team	
25 June 2022	LB	(England) Alex Cochrane	(Scotland) Heart of Midlothian	Undisclosed	U21s	
30 June 2022	DM	(Romania) Tudor Băluță	(Romania) Farul Constanța	Released	U21s	
30 June 2022	CB	(Belgium) Lars Dendoncker	Unattached	Released	U21s	
30 June 2022	GK	(England) Adam Desbois	(England) Hartley Wintney	Released	U21s	
30 June 2022	CF	(Gabon) Ulrick Eneme Ella	(France) Angers	Released	U21s	
30 June 2022	RB	(England) John Lucero	(England) Worthing	Released	U18s	
30 June 2022	LW	(England) Jaami Qureshi	Unattached	Released	U18s	
30 June 2022	RB	(England) Ayo Tanimowo	Unattached	Released	U21s	
18 July 2022	CB	(Norway) Leo Skiri Østigård	(Italy) Napoli	£4,200,000	First Team	
4 August 2022	LB	(England) Zak Sturge	(England) Chelsea	Undisclosed	U21s	
5 August 2022	LB	(Spain) Marc Cucurella	(England) Chelsea	£56,000,000	First Team	
25 August 2022	CB	(England) Matthew Clarke	(England) Middlesbrough	£3,500,000	First Team	
26 August 2022	CF	(France) Neal Maupay	(England) Everton	£15,000,000	First Team	
1 September 2022	CF	(Romania) Florin Andone	(Spain) UD Las Palmas	Released	First Team	
1 September 2022	CF	(England) Zak Emmerson	(England) Blackpool	Undisclosed	U18s	
10 October 2022	MF	(Zambia) Enock Mwepu	Retired (Note: Mwepu was advised to retire after the diagnosis of a hereditary heart condition.)		First Team	
20 January 2023	MF	(Belgium) Leandro Trossard	(England) Arsenal	£21,000,000	First Team	
31 January 2023	CB	(Republic of Ireland) Shane Duffy	(England) Fulham	Undisclosed	First Team	

=== Loans in ===
Date	Pos	Player	Loaned from	On loan until	Team	Ref
5 August 2022	CB	(England) Levi Colwill	(England) Chelsea	End of Season	First Team	

=== Loans out ===
Date	Pos	Player	Loaned to	On loan until	Team	Source
13 June 2022	GK	(England) Fynn Talley	(Northern Ireland) Cliftonville	End of Season	U21s	
4 July 2022	LW	(Ivory Coast) Simon Adingra	(Belgium) Royale Union Saint-Gilloise	End of Season	U21s	
8 July 2022	GK	(England) Carl Rushworth	(England) Lincoln City	End of Season	U21s	
9 July 2022	CB	(England) Haydon Roberts	(England) Derby County	End of Season	U21s	
13 July 2022	RW	(Senegal) Abdallah Sima	(France) Angers	End of Season	U21s	
14 July 2022	CF	(Republic of Ireland) Aaron Connolly	(Italy) Venezia	6 January 2023 (Note: On 6 January, Connolly was recalled from his season-long loan at Venezia and joined Hull on loan)	First Team	
22 July 2022	AM	(England) Taylor Richards	(England) Queens Park Rangers	End of Season	First Team	
25 July 2022	CM	(Scotland) Marc Leonard	(England) Northampton Town	End of Season	U21s	
25 July 2022	DM	(England) Jensen Weir	(England) Morecambe	End of Season	U21s	
26 July 2022	SS	(Germany) Reda Khadra	(England) Sheffield United	10 January 2023 (Note: On 10 January, Khadra was recalled from his season-long loan at Sheffield United and joined Birmingham on loan)	U21s	
29 July 2022	AM	(England) Teddy Jenks	(England) Crawley Town	End of Season	U21s	
2 August 2022	CF	(Switzerland) Andi Zeqiri	(Switzerland) Basel	End of Season	First Team	
4 August 2022	RB	(Poland) Michał Karbownik	(Germany) Fortuna Düsseldorf	End of Season	First Team	
5 August 2022	CB	(Republic of Ireland) Shane Duffy	(England) Fulham	31 January 2023 (Note: On 31 January, Duffy signed for Fulham permanently, ending his season-long loan)	First Team	
16 August 2022	GK	(Netherlands) Kjell Scherpen	(Netherlands) Vitesse	End of Season	First Team	
23 August 2022	CF	(Switzerland) Lorent Tolaj	(England) Salford City	31 January 2023 (Note: On 31 January, Tolaj was recalled from his season-long loan at Salford and joined Dundee on loan)	U21s	
25 August 2022	CM	(Poland) Kacper Kozłowski	(Netherlands) Vitesse	End of Season	U21s	
1 September 2022	LB	(Republic of Ireland) Leigh Kavanagh	(England) Derby County	End of Season	U21s	
9 September 2022	DM	(Colombia) Steven Alzate	(Belgium) Standard Liège	End of Season	First Team	
2 January 2023	GK	(Republic of Ireland) Killian Cahill	(England) Bognor Regis Town	End of Season	U21s	
6 January 2023	CF	(Republic of Ireland) Aaron Connolly	(England) Hull City	End of Season	First Team	
10 January 2023	AM	(Germany) Reda Khadra	(England) Birmingham City	End of Season	U21s	
13 January 2023	RW	(England) Todd Miller	(England) Doncaster Rovers	End of Season	U21s	
13 January 2023	CB	(Wales) Ed Turns	(England) Leyton Orient	End of Season	U21s	
18 January 2023	GK	(England) James Beadle	(England) Crewe Alexandra	End of season	U21s	
31 January 2023	LB	(Republic of Ireland) James Furlong	(Scotland) Motherwell	End of Season	U21s	
31 January 2023	CM	(England) Jack Spong	(England) Crawley Town	End of Season	U21s	
31 January 2023	CF	(Switzerland) Lorent Tolaj	(Scotland) Dundee	End of Season	U21s	
31 January 2023	CB	(Belgium) Antef Tsoungui	(Belgium) Lommel	End of season	U21s	

=== First team transfer summary ===
Spending Summer: £ 40,300,000 Winter: £ 5,300,000 Total: £ 45,600,000	Income Summer: £ 104,400,000 Winter: £ 21,000,000 Total: £ 125,400,000	Net Expenditure Summer: £ +64,100,000 Winter: £ +15,700,000 Total: £ +79,800,000

== Pre-season and friendlies ==
On 17 June, Brighton announced details for their pre-season friendly games. Two matches against Union SG and Brentford will take place at the club's training ground, the American Express Elite Football Performance Centre and an away fixture was announced against Reading at the Madejski Stadium. Espanyol was later confirmed as the pre-season finale.

Win Draw Loss Fixtures

9 July 2022 Friendly	Brighton & Hove Albion	0–0	Union Saint-Gilloise	Lancing
18:00 BST		Report		Stadium: American Express Elite Football Performance Centre; Attendance: 0 (behind-closed-doors); Referee: Keith Stroud

16 July 2022 Friendly	Estoril Praia	1–4	Brighton & Hove Albion	Lisbon, Portugal
18:30 WEST	Martins 23'	Report	Maupay 1', 12'; Mitoma 65'; Undav 85'	Stadium: Estadio Pina Manique

23 July 2022 Friendly	Reading	1–2	Brighton & Hove Albion	Reading
15:00 BST	Méïté 59' (pen.)	Report	Groß 19'; March 47'	Stadium: Madejski Stadium

26 July 2022 Friendly	Brighton & Hove Albion	0–1	Brentford	Falmer
15:00		Report	Toney 78'	Stadium: Falmer Stadium; Attendance: 0 (behind-closed-doors)

30 July 2022 Friendly	Brighton & Hove Albion	5–1	Espanyol	Falmer
15:00	Webster 17'; Dunk 47'; Trossard 54', 63', 69'	Report	Joselu 77'	Stadium: Falmer Stadium; Referee: Stuart Attwell

8 December 2022 Friendly	Aston Villa	2–2	Brighton & Hove Albion	Dubai, United Arab Emirates
17:00 GST	Ings 67'; Dunk 87' (o.g.)	Report	Undav 73', 81'	Stadium: Training Camp; Attendance: 0

== Competitions ==
=== Overall record ===
Competition	First match	Last match	Starting round	Final position	Record							
Competition	First match	Last match	Starting round	Final position	Pld	W	D	L	GF	GA	GD	Win %
Premier League	7 August 2022	28 May 2023	Matchday 1	6th	38	18	8	12	72	53	+19	47.37
FA Cup	7 January 2023	23 April 2023	Third round	Semi-finals	5	4	1	0	13	2	+11	80.00
EFL Cup	24 August 2022	21 December 2022	Second round	Fourth round	3	2	1	0	6	1	+5	66.67
Total					46	24	10	12	91	56	+35	52.17

Source: Soccerway

=== Premier League ===
==== League table ====
Pos	Team	Pld	W	D	L	GF	GA	GD	Pts	Qualification or relegation
4	Newcastle United	38	19	14	5	68	33	+35	71	Qualification to Champions League group stage
5	Liverpool	38	19	10	9	75	47	+28	67	Qualification to Europa League group stage (Note: Since the winners of the 2022–23 FA Cup, Manchester City, qualified for the Champions League, the spot given to the FA Cup winners (Europa League group stage) was passed to the sixth-placed team.)
6	Brighton & Hove Albion	38	18	8	12	72	53	+19	62	Qualification to Europa League group stage
7	Aston Villa	38	18	7	13	51	46	+5	61	Qualification to Europa Conference League play-off round (Note: Since the winners of the 2022–23 EFL Cup, Manchester United, qualified for the Champions League, the spot given to the League Cup winners (Europa Conference League play-off round) was passed to the seventh-placed team.)
8	Tottenham Hotspur	38	18	6	14	70	63	+7	60	

Source: Premier League
Rules for classification: 1) Points; 2) Goal difference; 3) Goals scored; 4) If the champions, relegated teams or qualified teams for UEFA competitions cannot be determined by rules 1 to 3, rules 4.1 to 4.3 are applied – 4.1) Points gained in head-to-head record between such teams; 4.2) Away goals scored in head-to-head record between such teams; 4.3) Play-offs

==== Results summary ====
Overall								Home						Away					
Pld	W	D	L	GF	GA	GD	Pts	W	D	L	GF	GA	GD	W	D	L	GF	GA	GD
38	18	8	12	72	53	+19	62	10	4	5	37	21	+16	8	4	7	35	32	+3

Source: Premier League

==== Results by round ====
Round	1	2	3	4	5	6	9	10	11	12	13	14	15	16	17	18	19	20	21	22	23	24	26	27	8 (Note: Game on matchweek 8 was postponed due to a planned industrial rail strike. Game rescheduled for 15 March 2023.)	29	7 (Note: Game on matchweek 7 was postponed in mark of respect following the passing of HM Queen Elizabeth II. Game rescheduled for 4 April 2023.)	30	31	33	34	28 (Note: Game on matchweek 28 was postponed due to both Brighton's and opponents Manchester United's involvement in the FA Cup quarter-finals. Game rescheduled for 4 May 2023.)	35	36	25 (Note: Game on matchweek 25 was postponed due to Newcastle United playing in the EFL Cup final. Game rescheduled for 18 May 2023.)	37	32 (Note: Game on matchweek 32 was postponed due to both Brighton's and opponents Manchester City's involvement in the FA Cup semi-finals. Game rescheduled for 24 May 2023.)	38
Ground	A	H	A	H	A	H	A	H	A	H	A	H	A	H	A	H	A	H	A	H	A	H	H	A	H	H	A	A	A	A	H	H	H	A	A	H	H	A
Result	W	D	W	W	L	W	D	L	L	D	L	W	W	L	W	L	W	W	D	W	D	L	W	D	W	D	W	L	W	L	W	W	L	W	L	W	D	L
Position	6	8	5	4	4	4	4	7	7	8	9	8	6	7	7	9	8	7	6	6	6	7	8	7	7	6	6	7	7	8	8	6	7	6	6	6	6	6

Source: Premier League
A = Away; H = Home; W = Win; D = Draw; L = Loss

==== Matches ====
Win Draw Loss Fixtures

On 16 June, the Premier League fixtures were released.

7 August 2022 1	Manchester United	1–2	Brighton & Hove Albion	Trafford,
14:00 BST	McTominay (yellow card) 25'; Martínez (yellow card) 45+2'; Maguire (yellow card) 53'; Mac Allister 68' (o.g.); Shaw (yellow card) 74'	Report	Groß 30', 39'; Trossard (yellow card) 53'	Stadium: Old Trafford; Attendance: 73,711; Referee: Paul Tierney

13 August 2022 2	Brighton & Hove Albion	0–0	Newcastle United	Falmer
15:00 BST	Mac Allister (yellow card) 34'; March (yellow card) 58'	Report	Saint-Maximin (yellow card) 22'; Joelinton (yellow card) 58'; Schär (yellow card) 90+3'	Stadium: Falmer Stadium; Attendance: 31,552; Referee: Graham Scott

21 August 2022 3	West Ham United	0–2	Brighton & Hove Albion	Stratford
14:00 BST	Kehrer (yellow card) 20'; Cresswell (yellow card) 71'	Report	Mac Allister 22' (pen.); Trossard 66'	Stadium: London Stadium; Attendance: 62,449; Referee: Anthony Taylor

27 August 2022 4	Brighton & Hove Albion	1–0	Leeds United	Falmer
15:00 BST	Groß 66'; Webster (yellow card) 81'; Mac Allister (yellow card) 87'	Report	Struijk (yellow card) 8'; Roca (yellow card) 34'; Aaronson (yellow card) 37'	Stadium: Falmer Stadium; Attendance: 30,953; Referee: Michael Salisbury

30 August 2022 5	Fulham	2–1	Brighton & Hove Albion	Fulham
19:30 BST	Mitrović 48'; Dunk 55' (o.g.); Robinson (yellow card) 68'; Reed (yellow card) 83'	Report	Estupiñán (yellow card) 55'; Mac Allister 60' (pen.)	Stadium: Craven Cottage; Attendance: 22,224; Referee: Thomas Bramall

4 September 2022 6	Brighton & Hove Albion	5–2	Leicester City	Falmer
14:00 BST	Thomas 10' (o.g.); Mac Allister (yellow card) 12', (goal) 71' (pen.), 90+7'; Caicedo 15'; Trossard 64'	Report	Iheanacho 1'; Thomas (yellow card) 3'; Daka 33'	Stadium: Falmer Stadium; Attendance: 31,185; Referee: Tony Harrington

1 October 2022 9	Liverpool	3–3	Brighton & Hove Albion	Anfield, Liverpool
15:00 BST	Firmino 33', 54'; Webster 63' (o.g.); Alexander-Arnold (yellow card) 86'	Report	Trossard 4', 17', 83'; Estupiñán (yellow card) 29'	Stadium: Anfield; Attendance: 53,336; Referee: Andrew Madley

8 October 2022 10	Brighton & Hove Albion	0–1	Tottenham Hotspur	Falmer
17:30 BST	Veltman (yellow card) 49'	Report	Kane (yellow card) 18', (goal) 22'; Bissouma (yellow card) 31'	Stadium: Falmer Stadium; Attendance: 31,498; Referee: Tony Harrington

14 October 2022 11	Brentford	2–0	Brighton & Hove Albion	Brentford
20:00 BST	Toney 27', 64' (pen.), (yellow card) 90+3'; Jensen (yellow card) 45+1'; Baptiste (yellow card) 90+2'	Report	Caicedo (yellow card) 45+2'	Stadium: Brentford Community Stadium; Attendance: 17,016; Referee: Michael Salisbury

18 October 2022 12	Brighton & Hove Albion	0–0	Nottingham Forest	Falmer
19:30 BST	Caicedo (yellow card) 54'; Mac Allister (yellow card) 78'; Lamptey (yellow card) 90'	Report	Freuler (yellow card) 84'	Stadium: Falmer Stadium; Attendance: 31,463; Referee: Darren England

22 October 2022 13	Manchester City	3–1	Brighton & Hove Albion	Manchester
15:00 BST	Haaland 22', 43' (pen.); Mahrez (yellow card) 54'; De Bruyne 75'	Report	Caicedo (yellow card) 26'; Trossard 53'; Groß (yellow card) 61'; Estupiñán (yellow card) 74'	Stadium: Etihad Stadium; Attendance: 53,223; Referee: Craig Pawson

29 October 2022 14	Brighton & Hove Albion	4–1	Chelsea	Falmer
15:00 BST	Trossard 5'; Loftus-Cheek 14' (o.g.); Chalobah 42' (o.g.); Enciso (yellow card) 83'; Groß 90+2'	Report	Kovačić (yellow card) 11'; Havertz 48'; Sterling (yellow card) 50'	Stadium: Falmer Stadium; Attendance: 31,746; Referee: Andrew Madley

5 November 2022 15	Wolverhampton Wanderers	2–3	Brighton & Hove Albion	Wolverhampton
15:00 GMT	Guedes 12'; Neves 35' (pen.); Semedo (red card) 45+5'; Jonny (yellow card) 62'; Collins (yellow card) 65'	Report	Lallana 10'; Mitoma 44'; Groß 83'	Stadium: Molineux; Attendance: 30,732; Referee: Graham Scott

13 November 2022 16	Brighton & Hove Albion	1–2	Aston Villa	Falmer
14:00 GMT	Mac Allister 1'; Caicedo (yellow card) 57'; Groß (yellow card) 82'	Report	Ings 20' (pen.), 54'; Mings (yellow card) 26'; Cash (yellow card) 79'; Bailey (yellow card) 80'; Young (yellow card) 84'; Kamara (yellow card) 85'; Martínez (yellow card) 90+8'; McGinn (yellow card) 90+8'	Stadium: Falmer Stadium; Attendance: 31,581; Referee: Chris Kavanagh

Mid-season break for 2022 FIFA World Cup

26 December 2022 17	Southampton	1–3	Brighton & Hove Albion	Southampton
15:00 GMT	Aribo (yellow card) 60'; Ward-Prowse (penalty missed) 73', 73'	Report	Lallana 14'; Perraud 35' (o.g.); March 56'; Sánchez (yellow card) 73'; Caicedo (yellow card) 85'	Stadium: St Mary's Stadium; Attendance: 31,010; Referee: Robert Jones

31 December 2022 18	Brighton & Hove Albion	2–4	Arsenal	Falmer
17:30 GMT	Gilmour (yellow card) 45'; March (yellow card) 57'; Mitoma 65'; Ferguson 77'; Sarmiento (yellow card) 81'	Report	Saka 2', (yellow card) 54'; Ødegaard 39'; Gabriel (yellow card) 45+1'; Partey (yellow card) 45+2'; Nketiah 47'; Martinelli 71'	Stadium: Falmer Stadium; Attendance: 31,647; Referee: Anthony Taylor

3 January 2023 19	Everton	1–4	Brighton & Hove Albion	Walton, Liverpool
19:45 GMT	Price (yellow card) 74'; Iwobi (yellow card) 75'; Doucouré (yellow card) 90'; Gray 90+2' (pen.)	Report	Mitoma 14'; Ferguson (yellow card) 45', (goal) 51'; March 54'; Groß 57'	Stadium: Goodison Park; Attendance: 39,103; Referee: Andre Marriner

14 January 2023 20	Brighton & Hove Albion	3–0	Liverpool	Falmer
15:00 GMT	Dunk (yellow card) 17'; March 46', 53'; Welbeck 81'	Report	Matip (yellow card) 18'; Henderson (yellow card) 30'; Alexander-Arnold (yellow card) 65'	Stadium: Falmer Stadium; Attendance: 31,645; Referee: Darren England

21 January 2023 21	Leicester City	2–2	Brighton & Hove Albion	Leicester
15:00 GMT	Albrighton 38'; Barnes 63'	Report	Mitoma 27'; Ferguson 88'; Mac Allister (yellow card) 90+3'	Stadium: King Power Stadium; Attendance: 32,056; Referee: Thomas Bramall

4 February 2023 22	Brighton & Hove Albion	1–0	Bournemouth	Falmer
15:00 GMT	Veltman (yellow card) 9'; Dunk (yellow card) 70'; Caicedo (yellow card) 79'; Mitoma 87'	Report	Smith (yellow card) 84'	Stadium: Falmer Stadium; Attendance: 31,600; Referee: Craig Pawson

11 February 2023 23	Crystal Palace	1–1	Brighton & Hove Albion	Croydon
15:00 GMT	Hughes (yellow card) 27'; Sambi Lokonga (yellow card) 59'; Tomkins 69'; Doucouré (yellow card) 82'; Mitchell (yellow card) 89'	Report	Mac Allister (yellow card) 7'; March 63'	Stadium: Selhurst Park; Attendance: 24,827; Referee: Michael Oliver

18 February 2023 24	Brighton & Hove Albion	0–1	Fulham	Falmer
15:00 GMT		Report	Diop (yellow card) 70'; Carlos Vinícius (yellow card) 82'; Robinson (yellow card) 84'; Solomon 88'; Palhinha (yellow card) 90+1'; Willian (yellow card) 90+6'	Stadium: Falmer Stadium; Attendance: 31,619; Referee: Darren England

4 March 2023 26	Brighton & Hove Albion	4–0	West Ham United	Falmer
15:00 GMT	Mac Allister 18' (pen.); Veltman 51'; Mitoma 69'; Welbeck 89'	Report	Souček (yellow card) 55'; Bowen (yellow card) 58'; Rice (yellow card) 60'	Stadium: Falmer Stadium; Attendance: 31,523; Referee: Stuart Attwell

11 March 2023 27	Leeds United	2–2	Brighton & Hove Albion	Beeston, Leeds
15:00 GMT	Bamford 40'; Harrison 78'; Firpo (yellow card) 90'	Report	Mac Allister 33'; March 61'; Caicedo (yellow card) 83'	Stadium: Elland Road; Attendance: 36,471; Referee: Paul Tierney

15 March 2023 8	Brighton & Hove Albion	1–0	Crystal Palace	Falmer
19:30 GMT	March 15'; Caicedo (yellow card) 60'	Report	Doucouré (yellow card) 27'; Ayew (yellow card) 90+4'	Stadium: Falmer Stadium; Attendance: 30,933; Referee: Peter Bankes
Note: The match was originally scheduled for 17 September 2022, but was postponed due to an industrial rail strike.

1 April 2023 29	Brighton & Hove Albion	3–3	Brentford	Falmer
15:00 BST	Mitoma 21'; Welbeck 28'; Mac Allister 90' (pen.), (yellow card) 90+6'	Report	Jansson 10'; Toney 22'; Pinnock 49'; Hickey (yellow card) 89'	Stadium: Falmer Stadium; Attendance: 31,493; Referee: Michael Oliver

4 April 2023 7	Bournemouth	0–2	Brighton & Hove Albion	Kings Park
19:45 BST	Cook (yellow card) 90+5'	Report	Ferguson 28'; Steele (yellow card) 60'; Enciso 90+1'	Stadium: Vitality Stadium; Attendance: 10,266; Referee: Darren Bond
Note: The match was originally scheduled for 10 September 2022, but was postponed as a mark of respect following the passing of Queen Elizabeth II. Fixture rearranged to 4 April 2023.

8 April 2023 30	Tottenham Hotspur	2–1	Brighton & Hove Albion	Tottenham
15:00 BST	Son 10'; Perišić (yellow card) 67'; Kane 79'; Højbjerg (yellow card) 87'; Romero (yellow card) 90+1'	Report	Dunk 34'; Groß (yellow card) 64'	Stadium: Tottenham Hotspur Stadium; Attendance: 61,405; Referee: Stuart Attwell

15 April 2023 31	Chelsea	1–2	Brighton & Hove Albion	Fulham
15:00 BST	Gallagher 13', (yellow card) 45'; Chalobah (yellow card) 51'	Report	Welbeck 42'; Enciso 69'; Sánchez (yellow card) 77'	Stadium: Stamford Bridge; Attendance: 40,126; Referee: Robert Jones

26 April 2023 33	Nottingham Forest	3–1	Brighton & Hove Albion	Nottingham
19:30 BST	Felipe (yellow card) 4'; Johnson (penalty missed) 11'; Groß 45+3' (o.g.); Danilo 69'; Gibbs-White 90+1' (pen.); Navas (yellow card) 90+14'	Report	Buonanotte 38'	Stadium: City Ground; Attendance: 28,808; Referee: Jarred Gillett

29 April 2023 34	Brighton & Hove Albion	6–0	Wolverhampton Wanderers	Falmer
15:00 BST	Undav 6', 66'; Groß 13', 26'; Welbeck 39', 48'; Veltman (yellow card) 45+5'	Report	A. Traoré (yellow card) 90+1'	Stadium: Falmer Stadium; Attendance: 31,584; Referee: David Coote

4 May 2023 28	Brighton & Hove Albion	1–0	Manchester United	Falmer
20:00 BST	Webster (yellow card) 52'; Dunk (yellow card) 70'; Colwill (yellow card) 77'; Caicedo (yellow card) 87'; Mac Allister 90+9' (pen.)	Report	Casemiro (yellow card) 44'; Dalot (yellow card) 59'; Antony (yellow card) 70'; Shaw (yellow card) 90+4'	Stadium: Falmer Stadium; Attendance: 31,577; Referee: Andre Marriner
Note: The match was originally scheduled for 19 March 2023, but was postponed due to both teams' involvement in the FA Cup quarter-finals.

8 May 2023 35	Brighton & Hove Albion	1–5	Everton	Falmer
17:30 BST	Dunk (yellow card) 21'; Mac Allister 79'	Report	Doucouré 1', 29', (yellow card) 56'; Mina (yellow card) 18'; Gueye (yellow card) 25'; Steele 35' (o.g.); Calvert-Lewin (yellow card) 45+3'; McNeil 76', 90+6'; Onana (yellow card) 80'	Stadium: Falmer Stadium; Attendance: 31,567; Referee: Simon Hooper

14 May 2023 36	Arsenal	0–3	Brighton & Hove Albion	Holloway
16:30 BST	Partey (yellow card) 88'	Report	Estupiñán (yellow card) 34', (goal) 90+6'; Enciso 51'; Groß (yellow card) 55'; Undav 86'	Stadium: Emirates Stadium; Attendance: 60,139; Referee: Andrew Madley

18 May 2023 25	Newcastle United	4–1	Brighton & Hove Albion	Newcastle upon Tyne
19:30 BST	Undav 22' (o.g.); Bruno Guimarães (yellow card) 30', (goal) 90+1'; Schär (yellow card) 45+4'; Burn 45+4'; Wilson 89'	Report	Undav (yellow card) 45+2', (goal) 51'; Groß (yellow card) 57'; Mac Allister (yellow card) 64'; Van Hecke (yellow card) 80'	Stadium: St James' Park; Attendance: 52,122; Referee: Robert Jones
Note: The match was originally scheduled for 25 February 2023, but was postponed due to Newcastle United's involvement in the 2023 EFL Cup final.

21 May 2023 37	Brighton & Hove Albion	3–1	Southampton	Falmer
14:00 BST	Ferguson 29', 40'; Groß 69'; Veltman (yellow card) 72'; Buonanotte (yellow card) 90+3'	Report	Bednarek (yellow card) 14'; Alcaraz (yellow card) 34'; Elyounoussi (yellow card) 43', (goal) 58'; Ward-Prowse (yellow card) 64'; Bree (yellow card) 67'	Stadium: Falmer Stadium; Attendance: 31,507; Referee: Paul Tierney

24 May 2023 32	Brighton & Hove Albion	1–1	Manchester City	Falmer
20:00 BST	Enciso 38'; Veltman (yellow card) 89'; Van Hecke (yellow card) 90+1'	Report	Foden 25'; Silva (yellow card) 41'	Stadium: Falmer Stadium; Attendance: 31,388; Referee: Simon Hooper
Note: The match was originally scheduled for 22 April 2023, but was postponed due to both teams' involvement in the FA Cup semi-finals.

28 May 2023 38	Aston Villa	2–1	Brighton & Hove Albion	Aston
16:30 BST	Douglas Luiz 8'; Cash (yellow card) 22'; Ramsey (yellow card) 24'; Watkins 26'; Mings (yellow card) 37'; McGinn (yellow card) 67'	Report	Undav (yellow card) 12', (goal) 38'; Buonanotte (yellow card) 63'; Caicedo (yellow card) 73'; Groß (yellow card) 88'	Stadium: Villa Park; Attendance: 42,212; Referee: David Coote

=== FA Cup ===
Brighton joined the competition at the third round stage, and were drawn away to Middlesbrough. In the fourth round a home tie against Liverpool was confirmed.

Win Draw Loss Fixtures

7 January 2023 Third round	Middlesbrough	1–5	Brighton & Hove Albion	Middlesbrough
15:00 GMT	Akpom 13'; Giles (yellow card) 76'	Report	Groß 8'; Lallana 29'; Caicedo (yellow card) 55'; Mac Allister 58', 80'; Undav 88'	Stadium: Riverside Stadium; Attendance: 21,982; Referee: Simon Hooper

29 January 2023 Fourth round	Brighton & Hove Albion	2–1	Liverpool	Falmer
13:30 GMT	Dunk 39', (yellow card) 63'; Mitoma 90+2'	Report	Bajcetic (yellow card) 17'; Elliott 30'; Konaté (yellow card) 62'; Fabinho (yellow card) 86'; Robertson (yellow card) 90+1'	Stadium: Falmer Stadium; Attendance: 31,675; Referee: David Coote

28 February 2023 Fifth round	Stoke City	0–1	Brighton & Hove Albion	Stoke-on-Trent
19:15 GMT	Laurent (yellow card) 21'; Baker (yellow card) 50'	Report	Ferguson 30'; Undav (yellow card) 90'	Stadium: Bet365 Stadium; Attendance: 12,949; Referee: Darren Bond

19 March 2023 Quarter-finals	Brighton & Hove Albion	5–0	Grimsby Town	Falmer
14:15 GMT	Undav 6'; Ferguson 51', 70'; March 82'; Mitoma 90'	Report		Stadium: Falmer Stadium; Attendance: 29,415; Referee: Jarred Gillett

23 April 2023 Semi-finals	Brighton & Hove Albion	0–0 (a.e.t.) (6–7 p)	Manchester United	Wembley
16:30 BST	Mitoma (yellow card) 90+2'	Report	Casemiro (yellow card) 36'; Shaw (yellow card) 53'; Lindelöf (yellow card) 97'	Stadium: Wembley Stadium; Attendance: 81,445; Referee: Craig Pawson
	Penalties
	Mac Allister (penalty scored); Groß (penalty scored); Undav (penalty scored); Estupiñán (penalty scored); Dunk (penalty scored); Webster (penalty scored); March (penalty missed)		(penalty scored) Casemiro; (penalty scored) Dalot; (penalty scored) Sancho; (penalty scored) Rashford; (penalty scored) Sabitzer; (penalty scored) Weghorst; (penalty scored) Lindelöf

=== EFL Cup ===
Brighton entered the competition in the second round and were drawn away to Forest Green Rovers, the first time the senior team have played there. In the fourth round, another away tie was drawn, against Charlton Athletic.

Win Draw Loss Fixtures

24 August 2022 Second round	Forest Green Rovers	0–3	Brighton & Hove Albion	Nailsworth
19:45 BST	Casey (yellow card) 64'; Stevenson (yellow card) 66'; O'Keeffe (yellow card) 77'	Report	Undav 38'; Alzate 45+1'; Van Hecke (yellow card) 61'; Ferguson 90+4'	Stadium: The New Lawn; Attendance: 3,812; Referee: Tim Robinson

9 November 2022 Third round	Arsenal	1–3	Brighton & Hove Albion	Holloway
19:45 GMT	Nketiah 20'; Elneny (yellow card) 25'; Hein (yellow card) 26'	Report	Caicedo (yellow card) 8'; Welbeck 27' (pen.); Sarmiento (yellow card) 43'; Mitoma 58'; Lamptey 71'	Stadium: Emirates Stadium; Attendance: 59,233; Referee: Jarred Gillett

21 December 2022 Fourth round	Charlton Athletic	0–0 (4–3 p)	Brighton & Hove Albion	Charlton
19:45 GMT	Leaburn (yellow card) 34'	Report		Stadium: The Valley; Attendance: 17,464; Referee: Thomas Bramall
	Penalties
	Stockley (penalty missed); Forster-Caskey (penalty scored); Dobson (penalty missed); Rak-Sakyi (penalty missed); Blackett-Taylor (penalty scored); Sessegnon (penalty scored); Lavelle (penalty scored)		(penalty missed) Groß; (penalty missed) Trossard; (penalty scored) Ferguson; (penalty scored) Dunk; (penalty missed) March; (penalty scored) Lamptey; (penalty missed) Caicedo

== Squad statistics ==
=== Appearances ===
- Players listed with no appearances have been in the matchday squad but only as unused substitutes.

No.	Pos	Nat	Player	Total		Premier League		FA Cup		EFL Cup	
No.	Pos	Nat	Player	Apps	Goals	Apps	Goals	Apps	Goals	Apps	Goals
Goalkeepers
1	GK	(Spain) ESP	Robert Sánchez	25	0	23	0	2	0	0	0
23	GK	(England) ENG	Jason Steele	21	0	15	0	3	0	3	0
38	GK	(Canada) CAN	Tom McGill	0	0	0	0	0	0	0	0
Defenders
2	DF	(Ghana) GHA	Tariq Lamptey	25	1	3+17	0	2	0	3	1
4	DF	(England) ENG	Adam Webster	32	0	23+4	0	3+1	0	1	0
5	DF	(England) ENG	Lewis Dunk	42	2	36	1	4	1	2	0
6	DF	(England) ENG	Levi Colwill	22	0	13+4	0	1+1	0	3	0
29	DF	(Netherlands) NED	Jan Paul van Hecke	13	0	3+5	0	2+2	0	1	0
30	DF	(Ecuador) ECU	Pervis Estupiñán	41	1	31+4	1	4	0	0+2	0
34	DF	(Netherlands) NED	Joël Veltman	35	1	25+6	1	0+3	0	1	0
42	DF	(England) ENG	Odeluga Offiah	3	0	0+2	0	0	0	0+1	0
Midfielders
7	MF	(England) ENG	Solly March	39	8	31+2	7	4	1	2	0
10	MF	(Argentina) ARG	Alexis Mac Allister	40	12	31+4	10	4+1	2	0	0
13	MF	(Germany) GER	Pascal Groß	44	10	37	9	5	1	1+1	0
14	MF	(England) ENG	Adam Lallana	18	3	12+4	2	1	1	1	0
15	MF	(Poland) POL	Jakub Moder	0	0	0	0	0	0	0	0
19	MF	(Ecuador) ECU	Jeremy Sarmiento	12	0	1+8	0	1+1	0	1	0
22	MF	(Japan) JPN	Kaoru Mitoma	41	10	24+9	7	5	2	1+2	1
25	MF	(Ecuador) ECU	Moisés Caicedo	43	1	34+3	1	4	0	2	0
26	MF	(Sweden) SWE	Yasin Ayari	4	0	1+2	0	0+1	0	0	0
27	MF	(Scotland) SCO	Billy Gilmour	16	0	6+7	0	0+1	0	2	0
40	MF	(Argentina) ARG	Facundo Buonanotte	14	1	6+7	1	1	0	0	0
49	MF	(Republic of Ireland) IRL	Andrew Moran	2	0	0+1	0	0	0	0+1	0
51	MF	(Australia) AUS	Cameron Peupion	2	0	0+1	0	0	0	0+1	0
53	MF	(England) ENG	Jack Hinchy	1	0	0	0	0	0	0+1	0
71	MF	(England) ENG	Jack Hinshelwood	1	0	0+1	0	0	0	0	0
Forwards
18	FW	(England) ENG	Danny Welbeck	37	7	21+10	6	2+3	0	1	1
20	FW	(Paraguay) PAR	Julio Enciso	26	4	8+12	4	1+2	0	3	0
21	FW	(Germany) GER	Deniz Undav	30	8	6+16	5	1+4	2	2+1	1
28	FW	(Republic of Ireland) IRL	Evan Ferguson	25	10	10+9	6	4	3	1+1	1
First team players who left the club permanently or on loan during the season
8	MF	(Zambia) ZAM	Enock Mwepu	6	0	2+4	0	0	0	0	0
9	FW	(France) FRA	Neal Maupay	0	0	0	0	0	0	0	0
11	FW	(Belgium) BEL	Leandro Trossard	17	7	16	7	0	0	0+1	0
16	GK	(Netherlands) NED	Kjell Scherpen	0	0	0	0	0	0	0	0
17	MF	(Colombia) COL	Steven Alzate	1	1	0	0	0	0	1	1
24	DF	(Republic of Ireland) IRL	Shane Duffy	0	0	0	0	0	0	0	0
26	DF	(England) ENG	Matt Clarke	0	0	0	0	0	0	0	0
31	FW	(Romania) ROU	Florin Andone	0	0	0	0	0	0	0	0
41	MF	(England) ENG	Jack Spong	1	0	0	0	0	0	1	0
43	DF	(Wales) WAL	Ed Turns	1	0	0	0	0	0	1	0
46	DF	(Belgium) BEL	Antef Tsoungui	0	0	0	0	0	0	0	0
47	DF	(Republic of Ireland) IRL	James Furlong	1	0	0	0	0	0	0+1	0

Note

• Shane Duffy joined Fulham on 5 August on a season-long loan, made into a permanent transfer on 31 January 2023.

• Kjell Scherpen joined Vitesse on 16 August on a season-long loan.

• Matthew Clarke joined Middlesbrough on 25 August on a permanent transfer.

• Neal Maupay joined Everton on 26 August on a permanent transfer.

• Florin Andone joined UD Las Palmas on 1 September on a permanent transfer.

• Steven Alzate joined Standard Liège on 9 September on a season-long loan.

• Enock Mwepu announced he was forced to retire on 10 October, due to a hereditary heart condition.

• Ed Turns joined Leyton Orient on 13 January for the rest of the season on loan.

• Leandro Trossard joined Arsenal on 20 January on a permanent transfer.

• James Furlong joined Motherwell on 31 January for the rest of the season on loan.

• Jack Spong joined Crawley Town on 31 January for the rest of the season on loan.

• Antef Tsoungui joined Lommel on 31 January for the rest of the season on loan.

=== Goalscorers ===
- A blank squad number indicates the player has been transferred or loaned to another club.

Rnk	No	Pos	Nat	Name	Premier League	FA Cup	EFL Cup	Total
1	10	DM	(Argentina)	Alexis Mac Allister	10	2	0	12
2	28	FW	(Republic of Ireland)	Evan Ferguson	6	3	1	10
2	13	MF	(Germany)	Pascal Groß	9	1	0	10
2	22	MF	(Japan)	Kaoru Mitoma	7	2	1	10
3	7	MF	(England)	Solly March	7	1	0	8
3	21	FW	(Germany)	Deniz Undav	5	2	1	8
4		MF	(Belgium)	Leandro Trossard	7	0	0	7
4	18	FW	(England)	Danny Welbeck	6	0	1	7
5	20	FW	(Paraguay)	Julio Enciso	4	0	0	4
6	14	MF	(England)	Adam Lallana	2	1	0	3
7	5	DF	(England)	Lewis Dunk	1	1	0	2
8		MF	(Colombia)	Steven Alzate	0	0	1	1
8	40	MF	(Argentina)	Facundo Buonanotte	1	0	0	1
8	25	MF	(Ecuador)	Moisés Caicedo	1	0	0	1
8	30	DF	(Ecuador)	Pervis Estupiñán	1	0	0	1
8	2	DF	(Ghana)	Tariq Lamptey	0	0	1	1
8	34	DF	(Netherlands)	Joël Veltman	1	0	0	1
Own goals					4	0	0	4
Total					72	13	6	91

== See also ==
- 2022–23 in English football
- List of Brighton & Hove Albion F.C. seasons
