= Pascal Groß =

German footballer (born 1991)

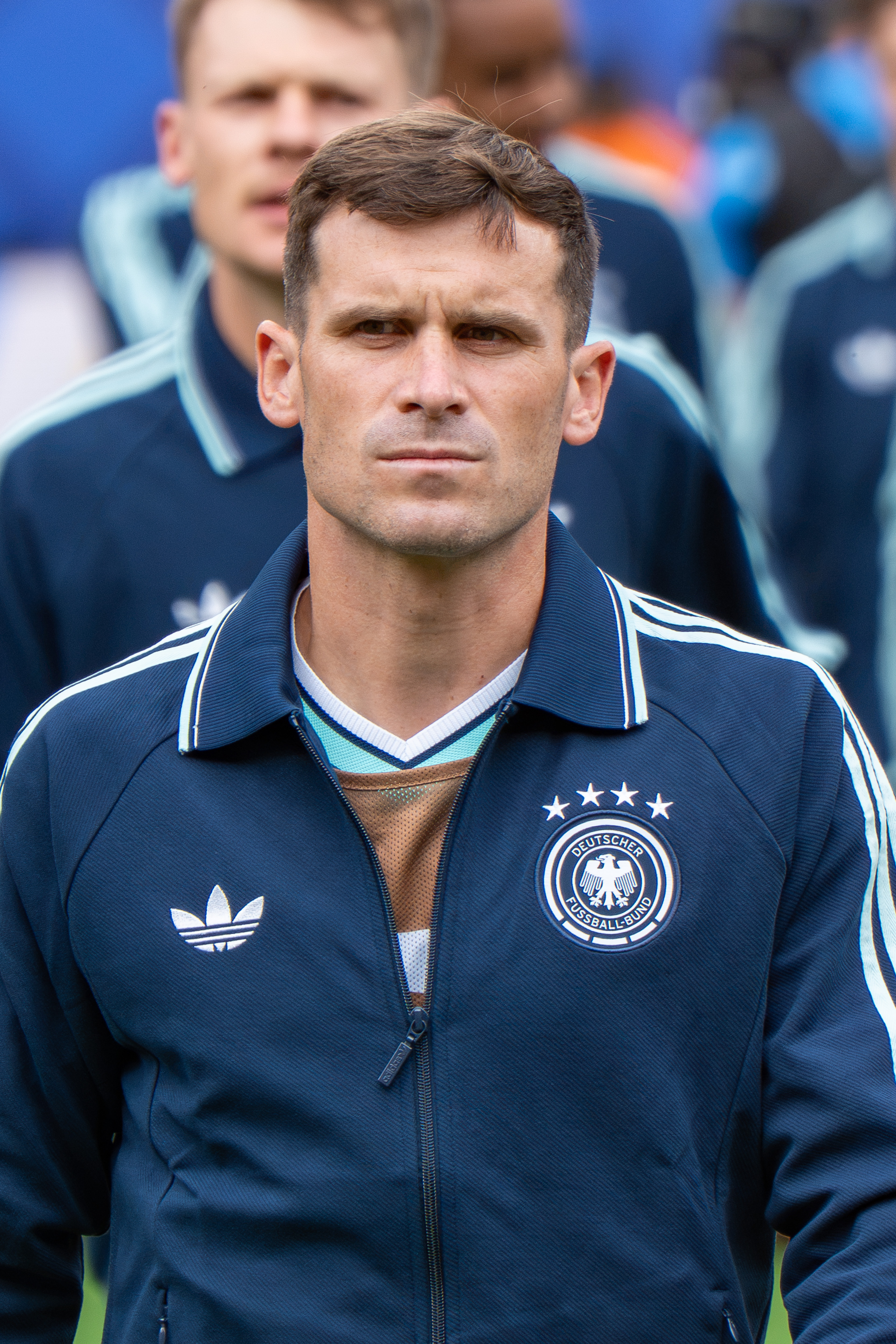
- Groß with Germany in 2026

Personal information
- Full name: Pascal Alexander Groß
- Date of birth: 15 June 1991 (age 35)
- Place of birth: Mannheim, Germany
- Height: 1.81 m (5 ft 11 in)
- Position: Midfielder

Team information
- Current team: Brighton & Hove Albion
- Number: 13

Youth career
- –2007: VfL Neckarau
- 2007–2007: TSG Hoffenheim

Senior career*
Years	Team	Apps	(Gls)
2008–2011	TSG Hoffenheim	5	(0)
2009–2011	TSG Hoffenheim II	17	(4)
2011–2012	Karlsruher SC	25	(3)
2011	Karlsruher SC II	11	(1)
2012–2017	FC Ingolstadt	158	(17)
2013	FC Ingolstadt II	1	(0)
2017–2024	Brighton & Hove Albion	228	(30)
2024–2026	Borussia Dortmund	41	(0)
2026–	Brighton & Hove Albion	30	(5)

International career^{‡}
2008–2009	Germany U18	10	(2)
2009	Germany U19	2	(0)
2010–2011	Germany U20	4	(0)
2023–2026	Germany	19	(1)
- * Club domestic league appearances and goals as of 22 November 2026 ‡ National team caps and goals as of 22:15, 25 June 2026 (UTC)

Pascal Alexander Groß (Note: German pronunciation: [pasˈkaːl ɡʁoːs]) (born 15 June 1991) is a German professional footballer who plays for Premier League club Brighton & Hove Albion. A versatile player, he has played as a defensive-midfielder, right-back, attacking-midfielder, winger, and forward in his career. Regarded as one of Brighton's best ever players, he was the club's all-time top scorer in the Premier League until 2025, when he was overtaken by Danny Welbeck.

Groß played for Germany at youth international level. He was called up to the senior squad for the first time aged 32 in August 2023, and made his debut on 9 September 2023 in a friendly against Japan. He was selected for the German final squads at UEFA Euro 2024 and the 2026 FIFA World Cup.

== Club career ==
=== Early career ===
Groß played his first fully professional match in the Bundesliga for 1899 Hoffenheim on 2 May 2009 in a 0–4 loss against VfL Wolfsburg. being substituted on in the 89th minute for Chinedu Obasi. He scored his first senior career goal playing for Hoffenheim II playing against Stuttgarter Kickers II on 16 August 2009. In January 2011, he transferred to Karlsruher SC along with Hoffenheim teammate Marco Terrazzino.

=== Ingolstadt ===
In the summer of 2012, Groß joined FC Ingolstadt on a two-year deal. In the 2014–15 season, he played a vital role in the promotion of FC Ingolstadt to the Bundesliga as he scored 7 goals and assisted 23 goals.

Groß scored five league goals for FC Ingolstadt in the 2016–17 season as they were relegated from the Bundesliga. He created more chances than any other player in the league that season, a total of 95 chances.

=== Brighton & Hove Albion ===
==== 2017–18 season ====
In May 2017, Brighton & Hove Albion signed Groß for a fee of £3 million. He agreed to a four-year contract while the transfer fee paid to Ingolstadt was the first of a series of record signings for the club that season. He made his debut for Brighton in the Premier League on 12 August 2017, in a 2–0 home defeat to title favourites Manchester City. On 9 September 2017, Groß made history by scoring Brighton's first ever Premier League goal, adding a second shortly after half time and providing an assist for Tomer Hemed in a 3–1 win at home against West Bromwich Albion. On 15 September, in Brighton's 2–1 league defeat away to AFC Bournemouth, Groß provided the assist for Solly March's opening goal.

Groß's creative exploits for Brighton throughout the month of September earned him a nomination for the Premier League Player of the Month award. He was a key player for Brighton, being directly involved in four of their league goals scored throughout the month.

On 15 October 2017, Groß provided his third assist of the season for Brighton, setting up Anthony Knockaert in a 1–1 league draw at home to Everton. On 20 November, Groß scored for Brighton in a 2–2 home draw against Stoke City. The goal brought his contribution tally up to three goals and five assists throughout the course of the season. Groß ended a successful season for Brighton with seven goals and eight assists, including heading the winner against Manchester United on 4 May 2018, a win that secured Brighton's Premier League status. Amongst many highlights, Groß was voted Brighton's player of the season by an overwhelming majority.

On 6 June 2018, Groß signed a contract extension with Brighton, keeping him at the club until 2022.

==== 2018–19 season ====
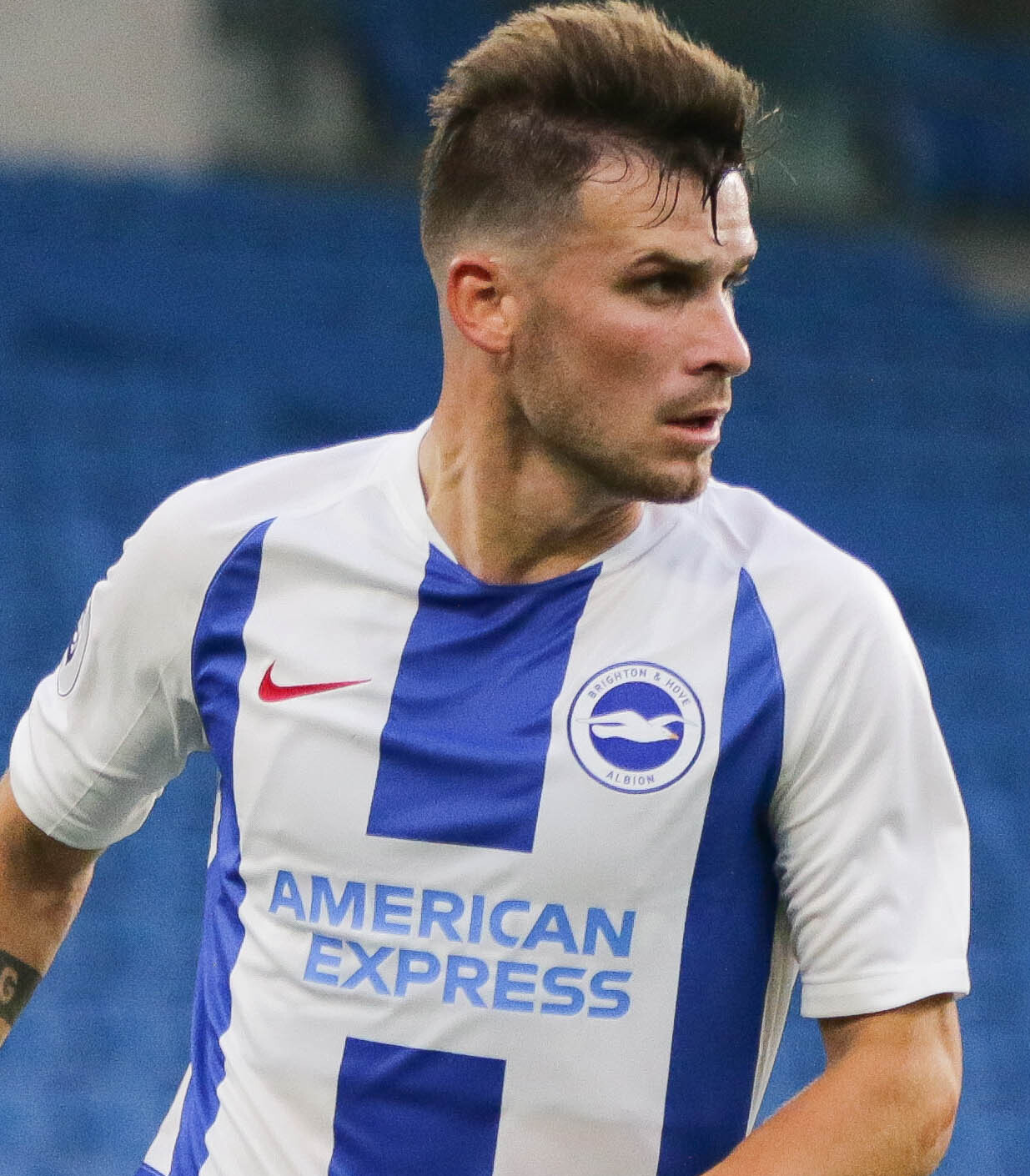
Groß playing for Brighton & Hove Albion in 2018

He scored against Manchester United again in another win over the side on 19 August 2018 in Brighton's first win of the 2018–19 season netting the Albion's third in a 3–2 home victory. Groß scored three goals from 4 May 2018 to 19 January 2019 which all came up against Manchester United. His third coming in a 2–1 away loss at Old Trafford. He made one FA Cup appearance where he came off the bench in a 2–1 home win over Derby County that took his team into the quarter-finals. The Sussex club were eventually knocked out by Manchester City in the semi-final at Wembley.

On 27 April 2019, he scored an equaliser at home against Newcastle United, helping Brighton claim a point in their fight for survival. On 4 May 2019 Brighton's bitter rivals, Crystal Palace beat Cardiff City – Brighton's relegation rivals – which ensured Brighton's Premier League football for the next season.

==== 2019–20 season ====
Groß played the whole of Brighton's opening match of the 2019–20 season, a 3–0 win at Watford. On 5 October, a Groß cross was spilt by Tottenham Hotspur's keeper, Hugo Lloris, and Neal Maupay nodded home the first in a 3–0 victory over the London side. Lloris dislocated his elbow after an awkward landing from the cross which would rule him out for the rest of 2019. Groß scored his first goal of the season to open the scoring in a 3–2 home win over Everton on 26 October 2019.

==== 2020–21 season ====
Groß made his 100th appearance for and captained the side in a 2–0 away win over Preston North End in the EFL Cup on 23 September 2020. He scored his first goal of the season on 28 November, a 93rd-minute penalty to claim Brighton's first Premier League points against the defending champions Liverpool. In the reverse fixture Groß appeared in Brighton's 1–0 away victory over Liverpool on 3 February 2021 to claim their first league win at Anfield since 1982. Groß captained Brighton on 18 May with Lewis Dunk out suspended in the match against champions Manchester City with fans returning to football. He assisted Adam Webster's header which tied the score at 2–2 – from 2–0 down – in which Brighton won 3–2 for their first victory over City since 1989.

==== 2021–22 season ====
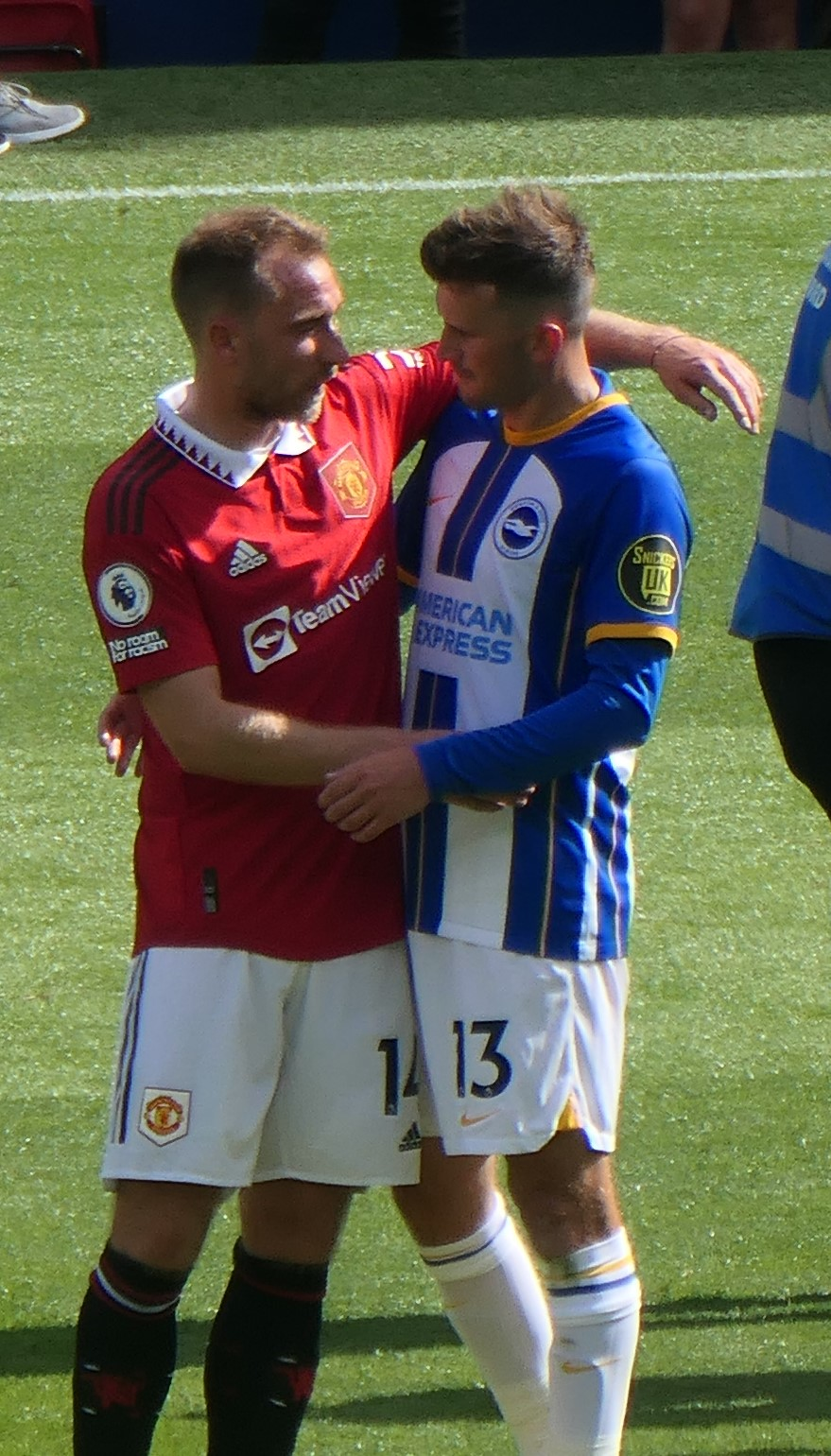
Groß with Eriksen (v Manchester United. August 7, 2022).

Groß set up Alexis Mac Allister's winner with a grounded pass into the box in the 2–1 away victory over Burnley on 14 August in the opening game of the 2021–22 season. He then assisted Shane Duffy's header from the corner spot in Brighton's 2–0 home victory over Watford on 21 August in the second game of the season. Groß had a penalty saved by Jack Butland in the home fixture against bitter rivals Crystal Palace on 14 January 2022, failing to put Brighton 1–0 up in an eventual 1–1 draw.

On 7 May, he scored his first goal of the campaign, calmly steering in Brighton's third in a 4–0 victory over Manchester United earning Brighton their biggest ever top-flight victory. Groß scored again two games later, his second and the last of the season on the final day of the campaign, putting Brighton ahead after they trailed at half time in the 3–1 home victory over West Ham United. He later assisted Albion's third goal, a Danny Welbeck strike, who happened to set up Groß's goal. The victory meant they achieved their highest-ever top-flight finish, finishing ninth.

On 3 June, it was announced that he had signed a new contract with Albion, signing on until June 2024. Graham Potter was pleased by Groß's extension, commenting "I am delighted for Pascal and the club that he's now signed," adding "He is an excellent professional on and off the pitch."

==== 2022–23 season ====
On the opening day of the season Groß scored both goals against Manchester United in the 2–1 away win to claim Brighton's first ever victory at Old Trafford, which gave him three in two games against United and four overall. Groß scored in Brighton's first home win of the season, as they beat Leeds United 1–0. Groß captained Brighton to a 5–1 away thrashing of Championship team Middlesbrough in the third round of the FA Cup on 7 January 2023. The opening goal was his first ever FA Cup goal. Groß made his 200th appearance for Brighton on 15 March, as Albion beat Crystal Palace 1–0 at Falmer Stadium.

On 19 April, Groß signed a contract extension to run until 2025. Roberto De Zerbi was very delighted with the announcement and cited Groß as "...one of the secrets to Albion’s success." Four days later, he played the full 120 minutes in the FA Cup semi-final against Manchester United at Wembley and scored a penalty in the shootout which Brighton lost. During the midweek after the FA Cup semi-final defeat, Groß scored his first Premier League own goal putting Nottingham Forest back level in the 3–1 loss. Groß responded with a brace over Wolverhampton Wanderers, helping Brighton to a 6–0 thrashing, their biggest Premier League victory. He scored his 10th goal of the season on 21 May, putting Brighton back to two goals in front of Southampton in the 3–1 home win which secured Brighton a European spot for the first time in their history. The strike put him level with Glenn Murray and Neal Maupay as Brighton's all-time top goalscorer in the Premier League with 26 goals.

==== 2023–24 season ====
On 26 August 2023, Brighton's third match of the season, Groß scored his 27th Premier League goal, becoming the club's all-time top scorer in that league, but his goal was a consolation in a 3–1 defeat at home to West Ham United. He scored Brighton's first ever away goal in Europe on 5 October, as they came back from 2–0 down to draw 2–2 at Marseille in the Europa League. He finished second only to Bruno Fernandes among the top players with most chances created in the league.

=== Borussia Dortmund ===
On 1 August 2024, Groß joined Bundesliga club Borussia Dortmund, signing a contract until June 2026.

On 11 February 2025, Groß scored his first goal for Dortmund in a first leg 3–0 away victory over Sporting Lisbon in the UEFA Champions League round of 32. On 22 February, he assisted four goals in a 6–0 home victory over Union Berlin, becoming the third player in Bundesliga history to ever do that.

At the end of the season he took part at the FIFA Club World Cup with Dortmund, with whom he reached the quarter-finals, eventually getting knocked out by Real Madrid with 3–2.

His time at Borussia Dortmund ended after a season and a half with 66 matches played, a goal scored and 17 assists provided.

=== Return to Brighton & Hove Albion ===
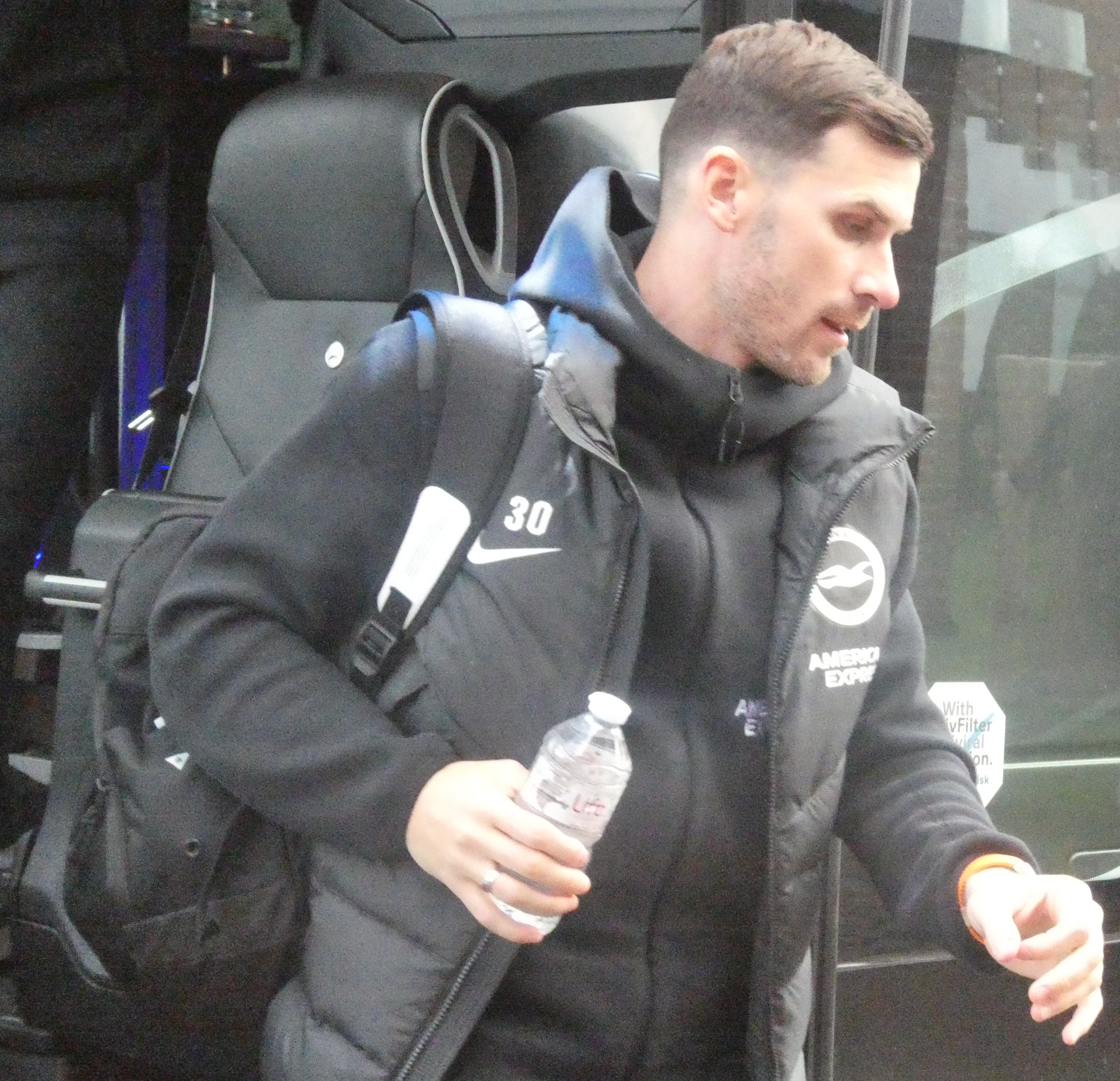
Groß with Brighton & Hove Albion in 2026

On 2 January 2026, Groß rejoined Brighton, signing a deal until June 2027. Explaining his decision to come back to the Amex, Groß said: "Since I wasn't getting much playing time in Dortmund, I wanted to go back to a place where I could have more influence and play more regularly, so I could also put myself forward for the World Cup." In the same month he would score his first goal since returning to the club in a 1–1 draw against Everton and earn a spot in Germany's 2026 FIFA World Cup squad.

During the 2026–27 season, Groß would go on to be awarded the Premier League Player of the Month in September, becoming the sixth-oldest player to receive the award.

On 20 November 2026, Groß signed a new contract until June 2028.

== International career ==
Groß has represented Germany at youth level for the under-18, under-19 and under-20 national teams.

On 31 August 2023, Groß received his first call-up to the Germany senior national team by head coach Hansi Flick, for friendlies against Japan and France. He made his debut on 9 September, coming on as a 64th-minute substitute in the eventual 4–1 home loss against Japan and went on to make his first start for Germany in a 3–1 friendly win over the United States on 14 October under new head coach Julian Nagelsmann.

Groß was named in Germany's squad for UEFA Euro 2024. He scored his first international goal in a pre-tournament friendly against Greece on 7 June, a 2–1 winner in the 89th minute. Only Richard Kress was older when scoring his first goal for Germany.

On 21 May 2026, he was selected in Germany's 26-man squad for the 2026 FIFA World Cup. After getting eliminated against Paraguay in the round of 32, he officially stepped back from the national team on 19 September 2026. Stating that he had already closed his international chapter after the team's elimination at the World Cup, Groß added that the time for a new generation under new head coach Jürgen Klopp had come.

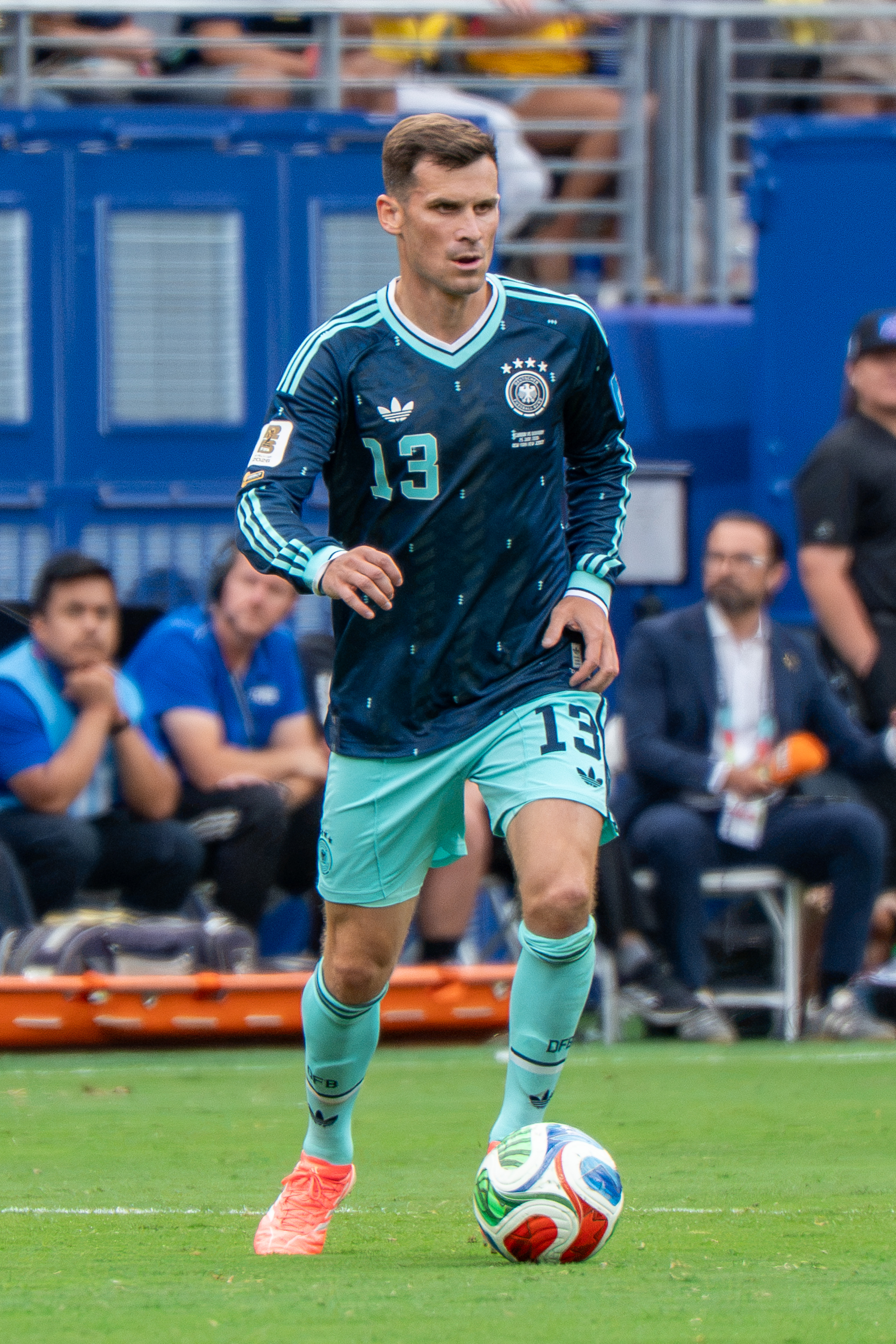
Gross during Ecuador v Germany at the 2026 FIFA World Cup

== Style of play ==
Groß can operate as a central midfielder, winger, attacking midfielder and right-back. He is an accomplished set-piece taker, known for his accurate corner kicks and free kicks.

== Personal life ==
Groß's father Stephan was also a footballer who played for Karlsruher SC.

He wears long-sleeved shirts when playing due to a grass allergy.

== Career statistics ==
=== Club ===
As of match played 22 November 2026

Appearances and goals by club, season and competition
Club	Season	League			National cup (Note: Includes DFB-Pokal, FA Cup)		League cup (Note: Includes EFL Cup)		Europe		Other		Total	
Club	Season	Division	Apps	Goals	Apps	Goals	Apps	Goals	Apps	Goals	Apps	Goals	Apps	Goals
TSG Hoffenheim	2008–09	Bundesliga	4	0	0	0	—		—		—		4	0
TSG Hoffenheim	2009–10	Bundesliga	1	0	1	0	—		—		—		2	0
TSG Hoffenheim	Total		5	0	1	0	—		—		—		6	0
TSG Hoffenheim II	2010–11	Regionalliga Süd	17	4	—		—		—		—		17	4
Karlsruher SC II	2010–11	Regionalliga Süd	3	0	—		—		—		—		3	0
Karlsruher SC II	2011–12	Regionalliga Süd	8	1	—		—		—		—		8	1
Karlsruher SC II	Total		11	1	—		—		—		—		11	1
Karlsruher SC	2010–11	2. Bundesliga	3	1	0	0	—		—		—		3	1
Karlsruher SC	2011–12	2. Bundesliga	22	2	1	0	—		—		2 (Note: Appearances in Bundesliga promotion play-offs)	1	25	3
Karlsruher SC	Total		25	3	1	0	—		—		2	1	28	4
FC Ingolstadt	2012–13	2. Bundesliga	30	2	1	0	—		—		—		31	2
FC Ingolstadt	2013–14	2. Bundesliga	29	2	2	0	—		—		—		31	2
FC Ingolstadt	2014–15	2. Bundesliga	34	7	1	0	—		—		—		35	7
FC Ingolstadt	2015–16	Bundesliga	32	1	1	0	—		—		—		33	1
FC Ingolstadt	2016–17	Bundesliga	33	5	2	0	—		—		—		35	5
FC Ingolstadt	Total		158	17	7	0	—		—		—		165	17
FC Ingolstadt II	2013–14	Regionalliga Bayern	1	0	—		—		—		—		1	0
Brighton & Hove Albion	2017–18	Premier League	38	7	1	0	0	0	—		—		39	7
Brighton & Hove Albion	2018–19	Premier League	25	3	1	0	1	0	—		—		27	3
Brighton & Hove Albion	2019–20	Premier League	29	2	1	0	1	0	—		—		31	2
Brighton & Hove Albion	2020–21	Premier League	34	3	3	0	3	0	—		—		40	3
Brighton & Hove Albion	2021–22	Premier League	29	2	2	0	2	0	—		—		33	2
Brighton & Hove Albion	2022–23	Premier League	37	9	5	1	2	0	—		—		44	10
Brighton & Hove Albion	2023–24	Premier League	36	4	3	0	0	0	8 (Note: Appearances in UEFA Europa League)	1	—		47	5
Brighton & Hove Albion	Total		228	30	16	1	9	0	8	1	—		261	32
Borussia Dortmund	2024–25	Bundesliga	30	0	2	0	—		12 (Note: Appearances in UEFA Champions League)	1	5 (Note: Appearances in FIFA Club World Cup)	0	49	1
Borussia Dortmund	2025–26	Bundesliga	11	0	2	0	—		3	0	—		16	0
Borussia Dortmund	Total		41	0	4	0	—		15	1	5	0	65	1
Brighton & Hove Albion	2025–26	Premier League	19	1	2	0	—		—		—		21	1
Brighton & Hove Albion	2026–27	Premier League	11	4	0	0	2	1	5 (Note: Appearances in UEFA Conference League)	0	—		18	5
Brighton & Hove Albion	Total		30	5	2	0	2	1	5	0	—		39	6
Brighton & Hove Albion Total			258	35	18	1	11	1	13	1	—		300	38
Career total			515	60	31	1	11	1	28	2	7	1	592	65

=== International ===
As of match played 25 June 2026

Appearances and goals by national team and year
National team	Year	Apps	Goals
Germany	2023	4	0
Germany	2024	8	1
Germany	2025	4	0
Germany	2026	3	0
Total		19	1

As of match played 7 September 2025
Germany score listed first, score column indicates score after each Groß goal

List of international goals scored by Pascal Groß
No.	Date	Venue	Cap	Opponent	Score	Result	Competition	Ref.
1	7 June 2024	Borussia-Park, Mönchengladbach, Germany	7	Greece	2–1	2–1	Friendly	

== Honours ==
FC Ingolstadt

- 2. Bundesliga: 2014–15

Individual

- Brighton & Hove Albion Player of the Year: 2017–18, 2023–24
- Premier League Player of the Month: September 2026
