= Moisés Caicedo =

Ecuadorian footballer (born 2001)

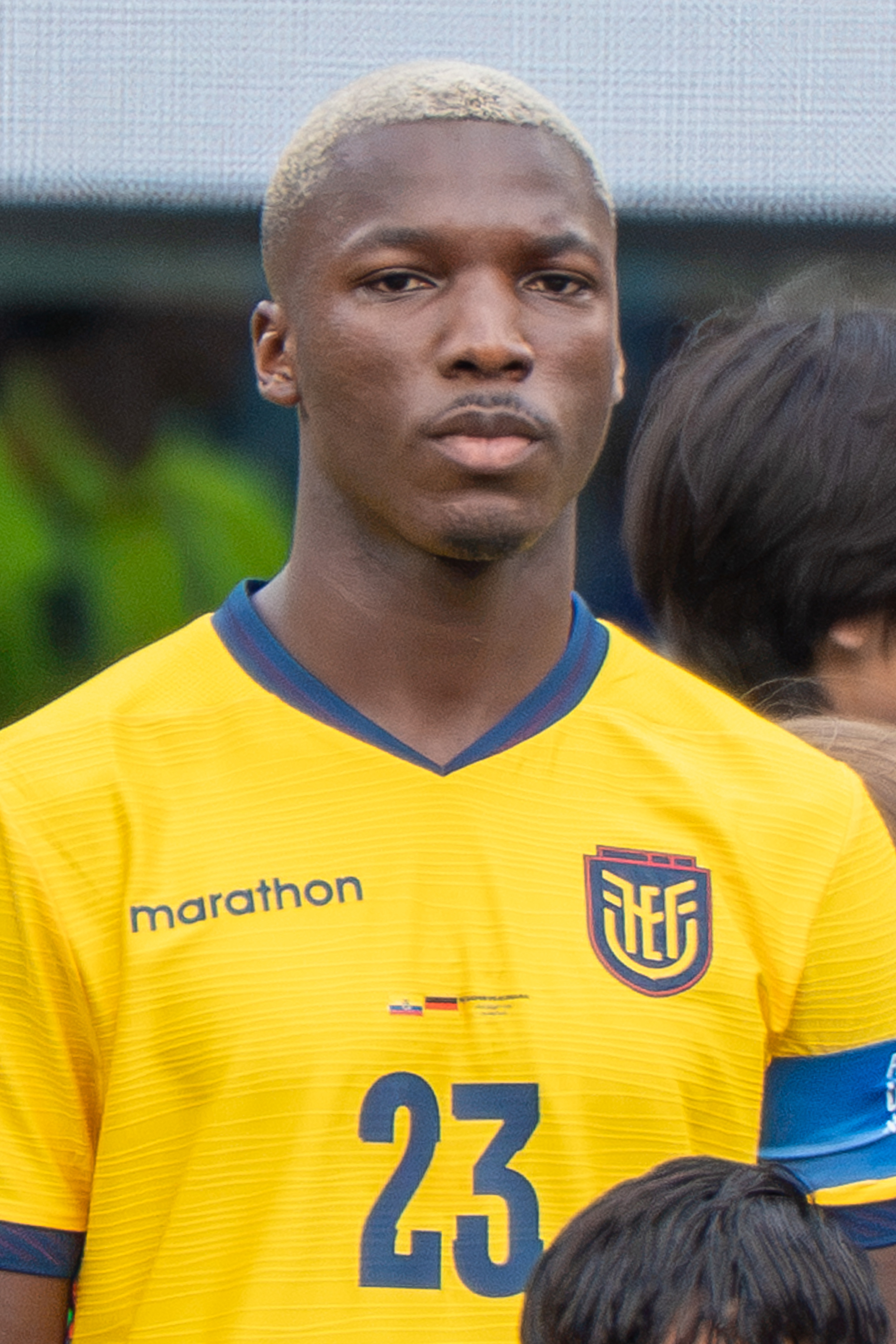
- Caicedo with Ecuador in 2026

Personal information
- Full name: Moisés Isaac Caicedo Corozo
- Date of birth: 2 November 2001 (age 25)
- Place of birth: Santo Domingo, Ecuador
- Height: 1.78 m (5 ft 10 in)
- Positions: Central midfielder; right back

Team information
- Current team: Chelsea
- Number: 25

Youth career
- 2007–2014: Mujer Trabajadora
- 2015–2016: Colorados Jaipadida
- 2016–2019: Independiente del Valle

Senior career*
Years	Team	Apps	(Gls)
2019–2021	Independiente del Valle	25	(4)
2021–2023	Brighton & Hove Albion	45	(2)
2021–2022	→ Beerschot (loan)	12	(1)
2023–	Chelsea	113	(5)

International career^{‡}
2020–	Ecuador	67	(4)
- * Club domestic league appearances and goals as of 14:37, 21 November 2026 (UTC) ‡ National team caps and goals as of 09:19, 18 November 2026 (UTC)

Moisés Isaac Caicedo Corozo (born 2 November 2001) is an Ecuadorian professional footballer who plays as a midfielder for Premier League club Chelsea and captains the Ecuador national team. Often considered one of the best defensive midfielders in the world, Caicedo is known for his passing and interceptions.

Caicedo began his career at Independiente del Valle. In February 2021, he joined Brighton & Hove Albion for an undisclosed fee, and broke into the first team following a loan to Beerschot in the Belgian Pro League. In August 2023, he joined Chelsea for a reported fee of £100 million, winning the UEFA Conference League in 2024–25.

A full international with over 60 caps for Ecuador since 2020, Caicedo was selected in the nation's squads for two Copa América tournaments and two FIFA World Cups.

== Early life ==
Born in Santo Domingo, Ecuador, the youngest of 10 siblings, Caicedo would play football on the scrubland pitches of his hometown, the Mujer Trabajadora neighbourhood, where goals were marked out by piles of stones. He met local football coach Iván Guerra as a child, who would help Caicedo and his family by paying for his football boots, travel expenses and food. Given Caicedo's sensitive nature, he was nicknamed "Niño Moi" by his teammates.

== Club career ==
=== Early career ===
Caicedo was invited to play his first organised football at the Mujer Trabajadora soccer school by Guerra, and he played there between the ages of five and twelve. The team would often play in games across the Santo Domingo Canton, and Caicedo earned a call-up to a regional select XI. Initially a forward, Caicedo later developed into a midfielder, and at the age of thirteen joined local side Colorados Jaipadida, an affiliate of professional club ESPOLI.

Following impressive performances with Jaipadida, he was invited to train with ESPOLI. However, following ESPOLI's relegation, the tie with Jaipadida was severed, and Caicedo was left without a direct pathway to professional football. Jaipadida director Darwin Castillo sent Caicedo to trial with professional side Mushuc Runa, but after he was unable to pay for food or board, the trial was ended after a week. A later trial with Barcelona in Guayaquil would also prove unsuccessful.

=== Independiente del Valle ===
In 2016 one of his brothers brought him to Ecuadorian Serie A side Independiente del Valle for trials, which he successfully passed. Having suffered a ruptured cruciate ligament in his knee in 2017, he required a number of surgeries, and was out for a total of ten months. Caicedo recovered from the injury, and following his arrival at the club to manage the under-18 side in 2019, Yuri Solano stated that Caicedo's athleticism "set him apart from the rest at that time".

Later in 2019, Caicedo captained the Independiente del Valle youth team to the Copa Mitad del Mundo title, a youth tournament in Spain. Following this experience, he made his debut for the Independiente del Valle first team in a 1–0 Ecuadorian Serie A win over L.D.U. Quito on 1 October of the same year. First team manager at the time, Miguel Ángel Ramírez, would later say that "from the first day he trained with us, he was the best player in the squad".

Such was his importance to the first team squad, Ramirez would have Caicedo flown back from an U-20 Copa Libertadores game in Paraguay to feature in a Serie A match against rivals L.D.U. Quito in 2020 – a game which Independiente del Valle won 3–2 – before returning to the under-20 squad to play in the 2020 U-20 Copa Libertadores final, where he shone in a win over Argentine opposition River Plate.

Throughout his time at Independiente del Valle, Caicedo was mostly deployed as a "number 5", a more defensive midfielder, but would also play at centre-back. Due to the form of Independiente's Argentine midfielder Cristian Pellerano, who also occupied the defensive midfield spot, Caicedo was pushed higher up, operating as a box-to-box midfielder. His performances in this role drew acclaim across the continent, most notably after scoring in a 5–0 win against Brazilian side Flamengo in the 2020 edition of the Copa Libertadores; after stepping over a pass from Beder Caicedo, a dummy which fooled a number of Flamengo defenders, he received the ball from a Gabriel Torres pass, before placing the ball past Flamengo goalkeeper César.

=== Brighton and Hove Albion ===
==== 2021: Transfer and first appearances ====
On 1 February 2021, Caicedo joined English side Brighton & Hove Albion on a four-and-a-half-year deal, for £4 million. On 10 February 2021, Caicedo made his first appearance in Brighton's first-team matchday squad in Brighton's 1–0 away loss against Leicester City in the FA Cup, where he was an unused substitute.

He made his debut for Brighton on 24 August starting in the EFL Cup second round away fixture at Cardiff City where he set up Andi Zeqiri's first Albion goal in the 2–0 win.

==== 2021–2022: Loan to Beerschot ====
On transfer deadline day of 31 August 2021, Caicedo joined Beerschot of the Belgium top flight on a season-long loan. He scored his first goal on his seventh appearance, a 90+2-minute strike to seal all three points in the 2–0 home win over Genk. On 12 January 2022, due to shortages of central midfielders at Brighton, Caicedo was recalled from his loan and returned to England.

==== 2022–23: Emergence and breakthrough ====
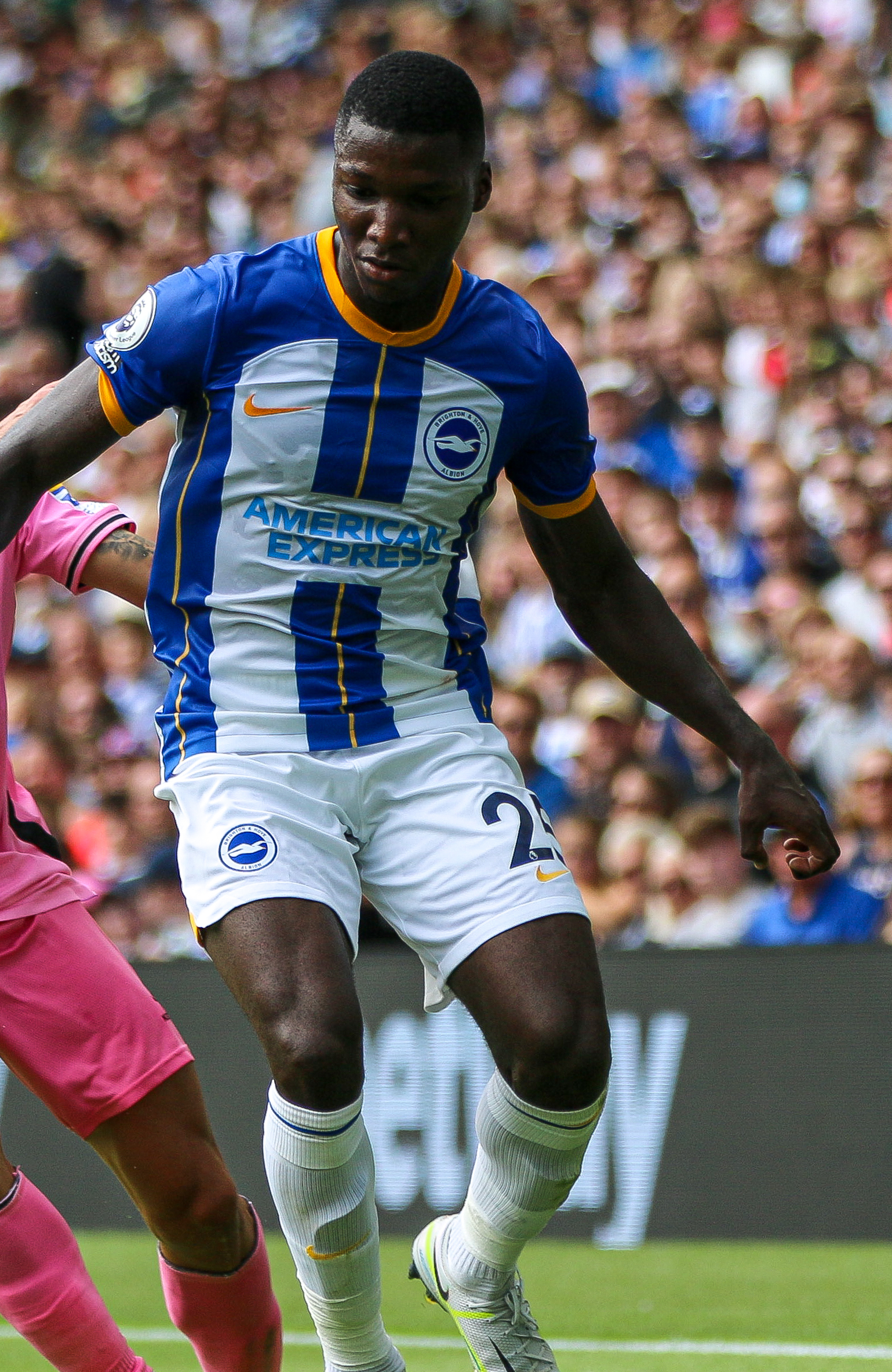
Caicedo playing for Brighton in July 2022.

Immediately on his return to Sussex, he was included on the bench where he remained for the 1–1 home draw against bitter rivals Crystal Palace on 15 January. He made his first appearance since returning and second overall for the Albion coming on as a substitute in the 3–1 away loss at Tottenham Hotspur in the FA Cup fourth round on 5 February. Caicedo made his Premier League debut on 9 April, starting and assisting Enock Mwepu's goal in the 2–1 away win over Arsenal. He scored his first goal for the Albion on 7 May, opening the scoreline in a 4–0 win over Manchester United, with a 15th minute low 25-yard strike.

Caicedo scored his first goal in the 2022–23 season in his and Brighton's sixth match of the season on 4 September, a 5–2 home win over Leicester City. During January 2023, Caicedo signed a new deal with a football agency company, and on 27 January, with interest coming in from league leaders Arsenal, his agents released a statement announcing he wanted to leave Brighton in an open letter on the player's Instagram page. The letter stated that, "I am the youngest of 10 siblings from a poor upbringing in Santa Domingo in Ecuador. My dream always to be the most decorated player in the history of Ecuador". Furthermore, Caicedo thanked Brighton fans, saying that they would "always be in my heart". Caicedo was linked with Liverpool, Arsenal and Chelsea.

On 30 January 2023, it was reported that Brighton had rejected a second Arsenal bid for Caicedo which was worth approximately £70m. Thus, with Brighton having refused to sell the Ecuadorian and with the 21-year-old in contract with the Sussex-based club until the summer of 2025, the club told Caicedo to rest until the end of the transfer window. He returned to training on 1 February and returned to action on the 4th, coming on as a substitute in the 1–0 home win over AFC Bournemouth with Roberto De Zerbi asking fans not to criticise the player. On 3 March 2023, Caicedo signed a new long-term contract with Brighton until 2027, with the option for another year. At Brighton's end of season awards, Caicedo won both Player of the Season and Player's Player, promising that "When I go back to my flat I will give this award to my mother and father, they are my inspiration."

On 27 June 2023, it was reported that Brighton had rejected a bid from Chelsea worth £80m for Caicedo. On 21 July 2023, de Zerbi stated that he would "start the next season with Caicedo in… [his] head in the first 11." On 10 August 2023, it was reported that Liverpool had agreed a £111m fee with Brighton for Caicedo, which was confirmed by Liverpool manager Jürgen Klopp a day later. However, on 12 August 2023, it was reported that Chelsea had agreed to a higher bid for Caicedo, offering a £115m fee to Brighton, inclusive of add-ons.

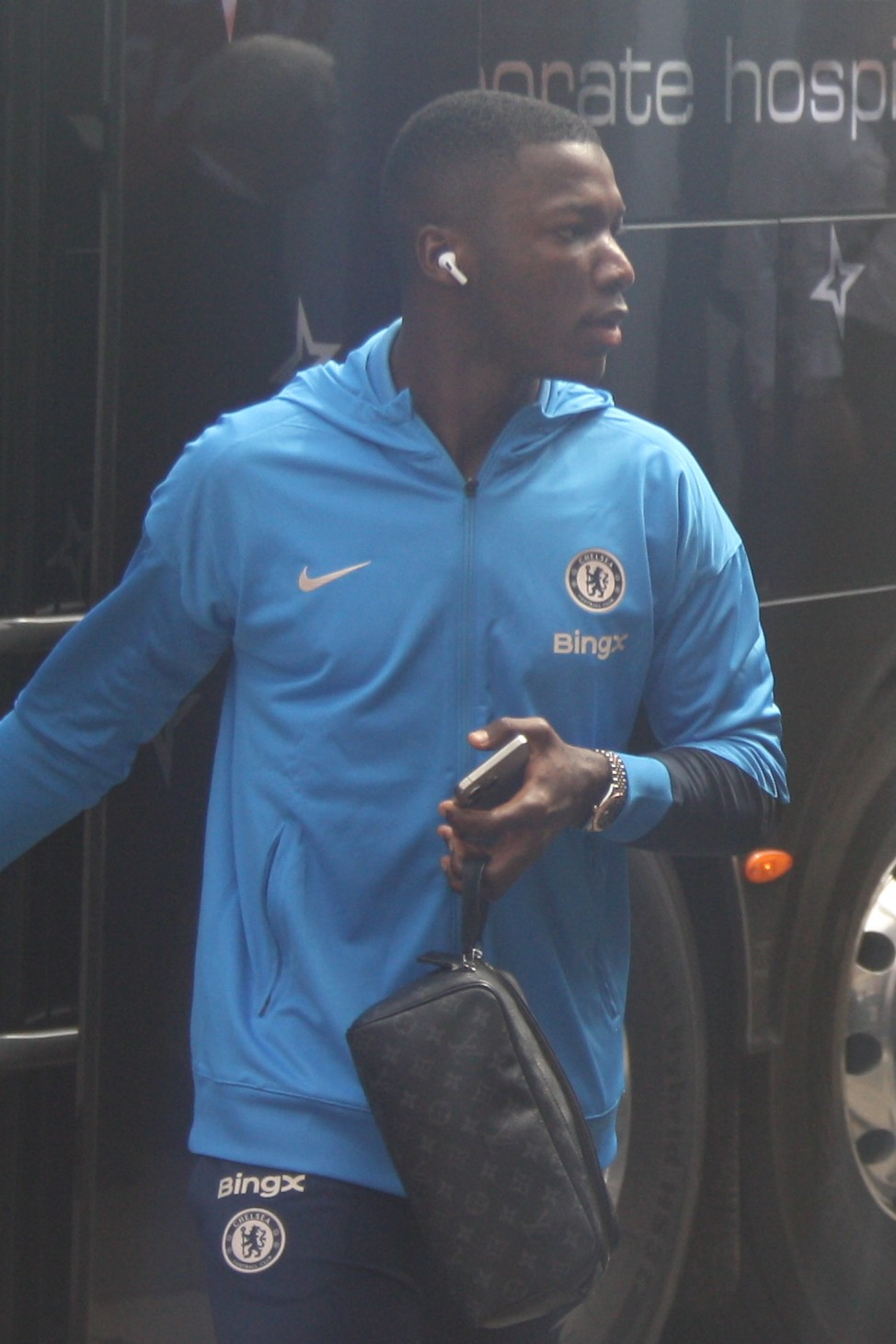
Caicedo with Chelsea in April 2025.

=== Chelsea ===
==== 2023–24 season ====
Caicedo joined Chelsea on 14 August 2023, signing an eight-year contract, with the option of a one-year extension. Although the fee was officially undisclosed, it was reported to be worth a base transfer fee £100 million. This fee could potentially increase to approximately £115 million due to performance related add-ons, a British transfer fee record for a single player, which would surpass the £107 million fee paid by Chelsea for Enzo Fernández. Caicedo received the squad number 25, which was not officially retired but had not been worn since Gianfranco Zola left Chelsea in 2003; Zola endorsed Caicedo's wearing of the number.

On 20 August, Caicedo made his debut for his new club, coming on as a substitute in the 61st minute in a Premier League match against West Ham United, which saw Caicedo give away a penalty which was converted by Lucas Paquetá, in a 3–1 loss. On 19 May 2024, the final match day of the Premier League season, he scored his first goal for Chelsea with a shot from 50 yards out, in a 2–1 win over Bournemouth.

==== 2024–25 season ====
On 22 August 2024, Caicedo captained Chelsea for the first time against Servette during the 2024–25 UEFA Conference League play-off round. On 3 November 2024, he netted his first goal of the season with a volley from the edge of the 18-yard box in a 1–1 draw in an away match against Manchester United. On 28 May 2025, he scored a stoppage-time goal in a 4–1 victory over Real Betis in the 2025 UEFA Conference League final. Following the conclusion of the 2024–25 season, Caicedo would be rewarded for his extraordinary performances with the Chelsea Player of the Season award. He was the only Chelsea player in the current squad to have started all 38 Premier League fixtures across the season.

==== 2025–26 season ====
On 22 August 2025, Caicedo made his 100th appearance for Chelsea, scoring in a 5–1 victory over rivals West Ham United. Later that year, on 22 October, he scored his first UEFA Champions League goal in a 5–1 victory over Ajax. On 17 April 2026, Caicedo signed a two-year contract extension with Chelsea, keeping him at the club until 2033.

== Style of play ==
Caicedo usually plays on the right side of a midfield pivot as a holding midfielder. His attributes are more defensive minded, but despite a more defensive role in the side, he is able to play box-to-box and contribute to his side's counterattacks. He is also a good passer while intercepting attacks along the midfield. Throughout 2025, Caicedo was often ranked among the best defensive midfielders in the world.

== International career ==
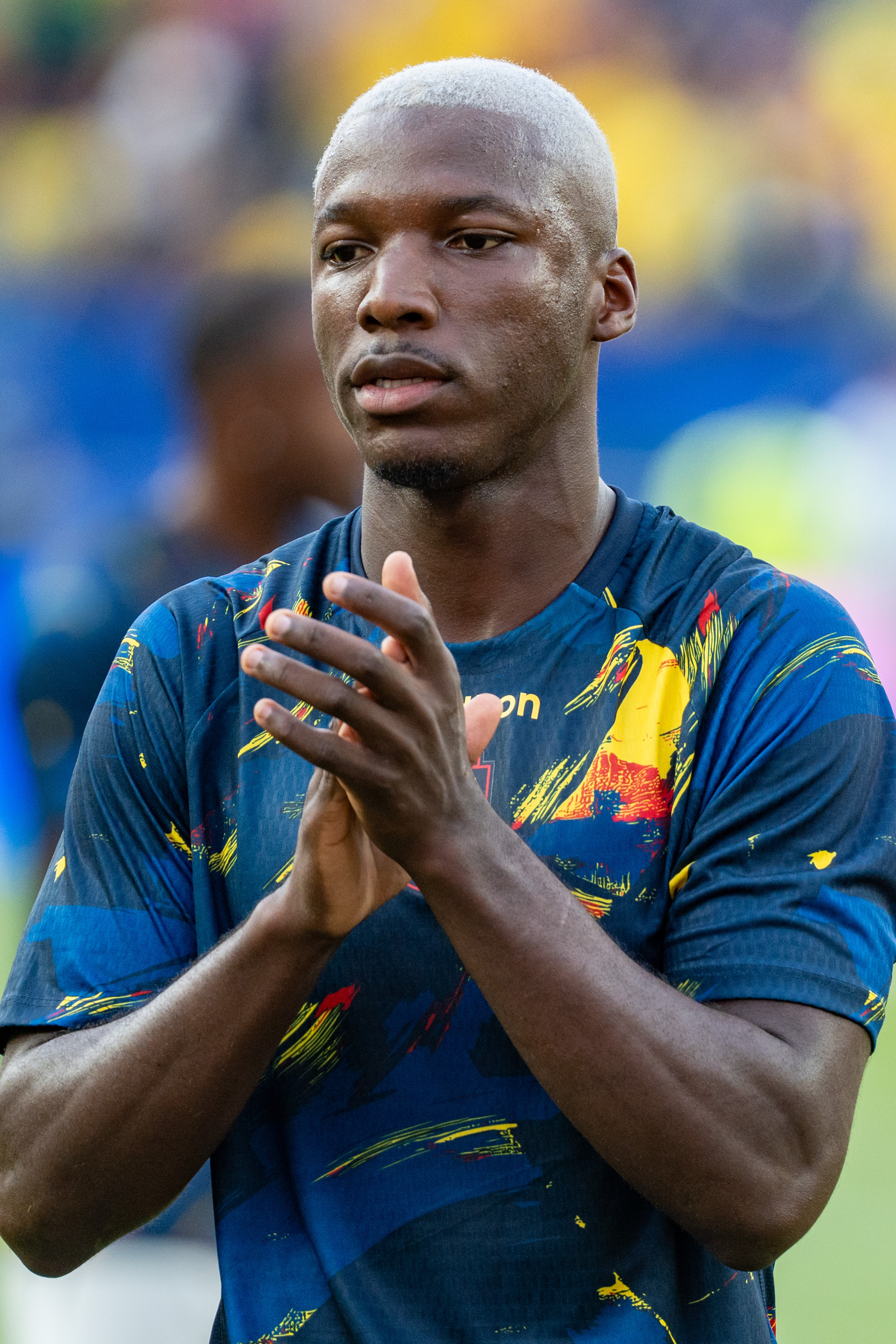
Caicedo with Ecuador at the 2026 FIFA World Cup

On 9 October 2020, Caicedo debuted for the Ecuador senior squad in a 1–0 2022 FIFA World Cup qualification loss to Argentina. The same year on 13 October, he scored his first goal in a 4–2 home victory against Uruguay at Estadio Rodrigo Paz Delgado.

On 14 November, Caicedo was named in Ecuador's 26-man squad for the 2022 FIFA World Cup alongside Brighton teammates Pervis Estupiñán and Jeremy Sarmiento. In the last group match tie against Senegal on 29 November, Caicedo scored the equaliser that would've seen Ecuador through to the round of 16. However, Kalidou Koulibaly scored for Senegal three minutes later to regain the lead and send the Senegalese through instead.

Caicedo was called up to the final 26-man Ecuador squad for the 2024 Copa América.

On 31 May 2026, Caicedo was selected in the 26-man squad for the 2026 FIFA World Cup.

== Personal life ==
Caicedo is a Christian. He and his partner Paola Salazar have a daughter born in 2024, and have been together since they were teenagers.

Through his foundation, Niño Moi 23, he promotes programs that encourage sports, education, and health. In this way, Caicedo has promoted sporting events, the delivery of educational supplies and food, as well as care in key areas such as pediatrics, traumatology, gynecology, and specialized surgery.

== Career statistics ==
=== Club ===
As of match played 21 November 2026

Appearances and goals by club, season and competition
Club	Season	League			National cup (Note: Includes Belgian Cup, FA Cup)		League cup (Note: Includes EFL Cup)		Continental		Other		Total	
Club	Season	Division	Apps	Goals	Apps	Goals	Apps	Goals	Apps	Goals	Apps	Goals	Apps	Goals
Independiente del Valle	2019	Ecuadorian Serie A	3	0	0	0	—		—		—		3	0
Independiente del Valle	2020	Ecuadorian Serie A	22	4	0	0	—		6 (Note: Appearances in Copa Libertadores)	2	—		28	6
Independiente del Valle	Total		25	4	0	0	—		6	2	—		31	6
Brighton & Hove Albion	2020–21	Premier League	0	0	0	0	—		—		—		0	0
Brighton & Hove Albion	2021–22	Premier League	8	1	1	0	1	0	—		—		10	1
Brighton & Hove Albion	2022–23	Premier League	37	1	4	0	2	0	—		—		43	1
Brighton & Hove Albion	Total		45	2	5	0	3	0	—		—		53	2
Beerschot (loan)	2021–22	Belgian Pro League	12	1	2	1	—		—		—		14	2
Chelsea	2023–24	Premier League	35	1	6	0	7	0	—		—		48	1
Chelsea	2024–25	Premier League	38	1	1	0	0	0	6 (Note: Appearances in UEFA Conference League)	1	5 (Note: Appearances in FIFA Club World Cup)	0	50	2
Chelsea	2025–26	Premier League	33	3	4	0	3	0	10 (Note: Appearances in UEFA Champions League)	2	—		50	5
Chelsea	2026–27	Premier League	7	0	0	0	1	0	—		—		7	0
Chelsea	Total		113	5	11	0	11	0	16	3	5	0	156	8
Career total			195	12	18	1	14	0	22	5	5	0	254	18

=== International ===
As of match played 17 November 2026

Appearances and goals by national team and year
National team	Year	Apps	Goals
Ecuador	2020	4	1
Ecuador	2021	13	1
Ecuador	2022	11	1
Ecuador	2023	10	0
Ecuador	2024	13	0
Ecuador	2025	7	0
Ecuador	2026	9	1
Total		67	4

Scores and results list Ecuador's goal tally first.

List of international goals scored by Moisés Caicedo
No.	Date	Venue	Opponent	Score	Result	Competition
1	13 October 2020	Estadio Rodrigo Paz Delgado, Quito, Ecuador	Uruguay	1–0	4–2	2022 FIFA World Cup qualification
2	16 November 2021	Estadio San Carlos de Apoquindo, Santiago, Chile	Chile	2–0	2–0	2022 FIFA World Cup qualification
3	29 November 2022	Khalifa International Stadium, Al-Rayyan, Qatar	Senegal	1–1	1–2	2022 FIFA World Cup
4	13 November 2026	Estadio Olímpico Atahualpa, Quito, Ecuador	Costa Rica	2–0	2–0	Friendly

== Honours ==
Independiente U20

- U-20 Copa Libertadores: 2020

Chelsea

- UEFA Conference League: 2024–25
- FIFA Club World Cup: 2025
- FA Cup runner-up: 2025–26
- EFL Cup runner-up: 2023–24

Individual

- Brighton & Hove Albion Player of the Season: 2022–23
- Brighton & Hove Albion Players' Player of the Season: 2022–23
- Chelsea Goal of the Season: 2023–24
- Chelsea Player of the Season: 2024–25
- Chelsea Players' Player of the Season: 2024–25
- Chelsea Player of the Month: September 2025, October 2025,
- Chelsea Goal of the Month: September 2025, October 2025,
- FIFA Club World Cup Bronze Ball: 2025
- IFFHS Men's CONMEBOL Team: 2025
