= Jack Hinchy =

English footballer (born 2003)

Personal information
- Full name: Jack Samuel Lawrence Hinchy
- Date of birth: 30 January 2003 (age 23)
- Place of birth: Swindon, England
- Height: 1.80 m (5 ft 11 in)
- Position: Central midfielder

Team information
- Current team: Altrincham
- Number: 4

Youth career
- –2021: Stockport County
- 2021–2024: Brighton & Hove Albion

Senior career*
Years	Team	Apps	(Gls)
2021	Stockport County	0	(0)
2021–2024	Brighton & Hove Albion	0	(0)
2024	→ Shrewsbury Town (loan)	12	(0)
2024–2026	Notts County	25	(1)
2025	→ Altrincham (loan)	4	(0)
2026	→ Wealdstone (loan)	11	(0)
2026–	Altrincham	0	(0)
- * Club domestic league appearances and goals as of 16:16, 7 June 2026 (UTC)

Jack Samuel Lawrence Hinchy (born 30 January 2003) is an English professional footballer who plays as a central midfielder for National League club Altrincham.

== Career ==
=== Stockport County ===
Hinchy started his career at Stockport County, progressing through the academy and signing his first professional contract in February 2021. He made his debut for Stockport in an FA Cup tie against West Ham United.

=== Brighton & Hove Albion ===
In August 2021, Hinchy moved to the academy of Premier League side Brighton & Hove Albion. He made his senior debut for the Albion a year later on 24 August 2022, replacing Tariq Lamptey in the 80th minute of the 3–0 EFL Cup second round victory over League One side Forest Green Rovers.

On 1 February 2024, Hinchy joined League One club Shrewsbury Town on loan for the remainder of the season.

=== Notts County ===
On 26 July 2024, Hinchy joined League Two club Notts County on a two-year deal.

On 1 October 2025, Hinchy joined National League club Altrincham on loan until January 2026. He was recalled by Notts County on 11 December.

On 3 March 2026, Hinchy joined National League side Wealdstone on loan until the end of the season.

In May 2026, Notts County announced that Hinchy would be leaving the club upon the expiry of his contract.

=== Altrincham ===
On 30 June 2026, Hinchy returned to National League club Altrincham following his loan spell the previous season.

== Career statistics ==
As of match played 17 May 2026

Appearances and goals by club, season and competition
Club	Season	League			FA Cup		EFL Cup		Other		Total	
Club	Season	Division	Apps	Goals	Apps	Goals	Apps	Goals	Apps	Goals	Apps	Goals
Stockport County	2020–21	National League	0	0	1	0	—		0	0	1	0
Brighton & Hove Albion	2021–22	Premier League	0	0	0	0	0	0	—		0	0
Brighton & Hove Albion	2022–23	Premier League	0	0	0	0	1	0	—		1	0
Brighton & Hove Albion	2023–24	Premier League	0	0	1	0	0	0	0	0	1	0
Brighton & Hove Albion	Total		0	0	1	0	1	0	0	0	2	0
Brighton & Hove Albion U21	2023–24	—			—		—		2 (Note: Appearance(s) in EFL Trophy)	0	2	0
Shrewsbury Town (loan)	2023–24	League One	12	0	—		—		—		12	0
Notts County	2024–25	League Two	25	1	2	0	1	0	3	0	31	1
Notts County	2025–26	League Two	2	0	0	0	0	0	1	0	3	0
Notts County	Total		27	1	2	0	1	0	4	0	34	1
Altrincham (loan)	2025–26	National League	4	0	2	0	—		0	0	6	0
Wealdstone (loan)	2025–26	National League	11	0	0	0	—		2 (Note: Appearance(s) in FA Trophy)	0	13	0
Career total			54	1	6	0	2	0	8	0	70	1

== Honours ==
Wealdstone

- FA Trophy runner-up: 2025–26
