= Adam Webster (footballer, born 1995) =

English footballer

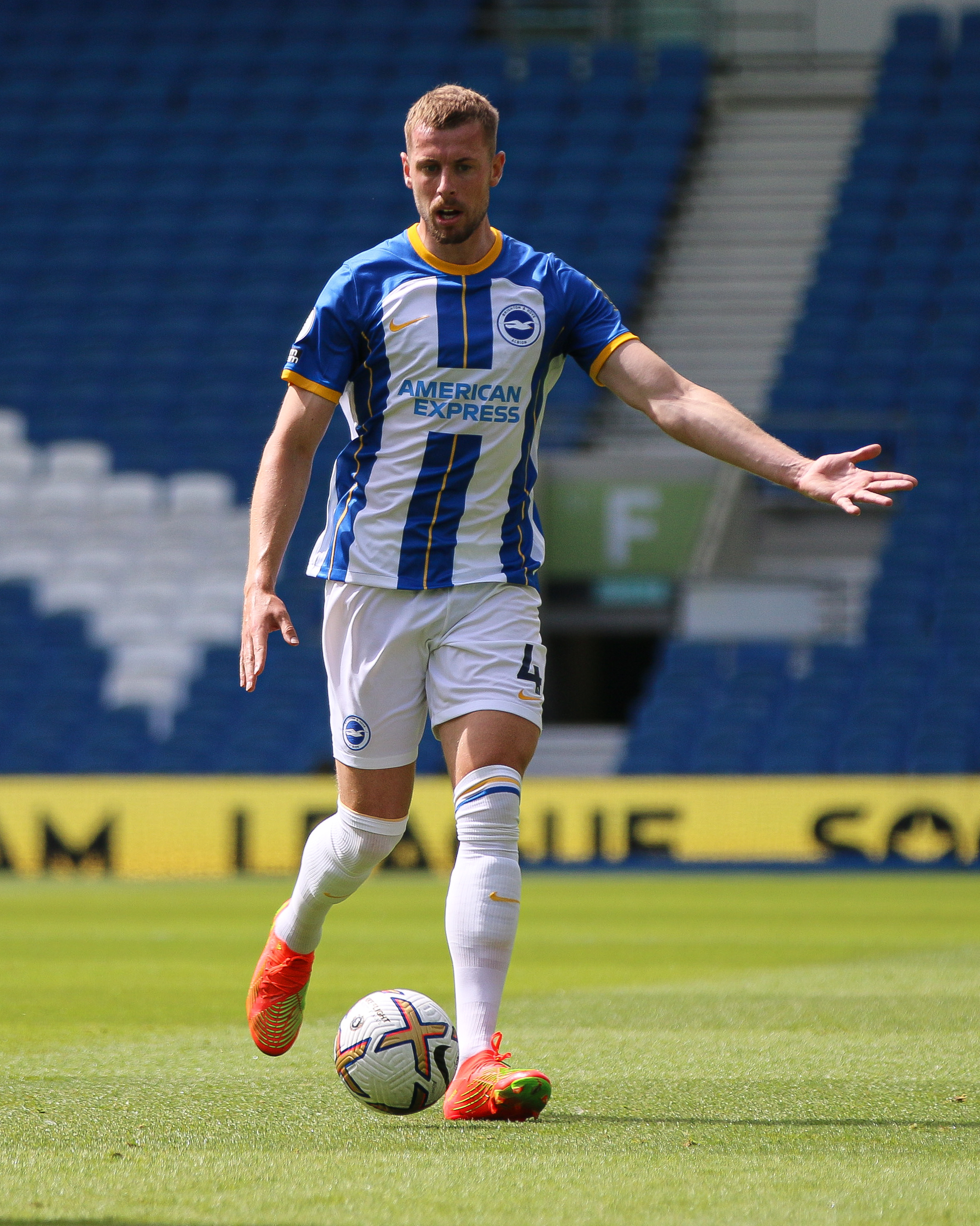
- Webster playing for Brighton & Hove Albion in 2022

Personal information
- Full name: Adam Harry Webster
- Date of birth: 4 January 1995 (age 31)
- Place of birth: West Wittering, England
- Height: 6 ft 3 in (1.91 m)
- Position: Centre-back

Youth career
- 2007–2012: Portsmouth

Senior career*
Years	Team	Apps	(Gls)
2012–2016	Portsmouth	67	(5)
2013–2014	→ Aldershot Town (loan)	24	(0)
2016–2018	Ipswich Town	51	(1)
2018–2019	Bristol City	44	(3)
2019–2026	Brighton & Hove Albion	138	(6)

International career
2012	England U18	1	(0)
2012–2013	England U19	6	(0)
- * Club domestic league appearances and goals as of 1 July 2026

Adam Harry Webster (born 4 January 1995) is an English professional footballer who plays as a centre-back.

Webster is a product of Portsmouth's youth academy and made his first-team debut for the club in 2012. Before signing for Ipswich Town in 2016, he had one loan spell with Aldershot Town a year after debuting for Portsmouth. In 2018, he had a brief stint with Bristol City, before moving to Brighton & Hove Albion the following year.

== Early life ==
Webster was born on 4 January 1995 in West Wittering, England.

== Club career ==
=== Portsmouth ===
Webster joined Portsmouth at 12 years old, following rejections from Southampton, Chelsea and even Portsmouth from the age of 10. He signed academy scholarship with the club in the summer of 2011.

Under the management of Michael Appleton, Webster was given more first-team opportunities. Following an unused substitute appearance against Chelsea in the FA Cup, he made his debut at the age of 17 the following weekend in a Football League Championship match against West Ham United. He came on at right back in place of Greg Halford on the 75th minute.

In the following season, Webster received the no. 22 jersey, and had more opportunities in first team, making his breakthrough as a full back. When recalled from Aldershot Town, he was put into the starting line up against Hartlepool United. Webster scored the only goal of the game, and his first senior goal, handing Portsmouth a 1–0 victory.

==== Aldershot Town (loan) ====
On 6 August 2013, Webster joined Aldershot Town on loan, until January 2014. He made his Shots debut four days later, in a 1–1 away draw against Grimsby. He returned to Pompey on 4 January, after making 21 appearances, and on the 21st he rejoined the Shots on loan until the end of the season.

=== Ipswich Town ===
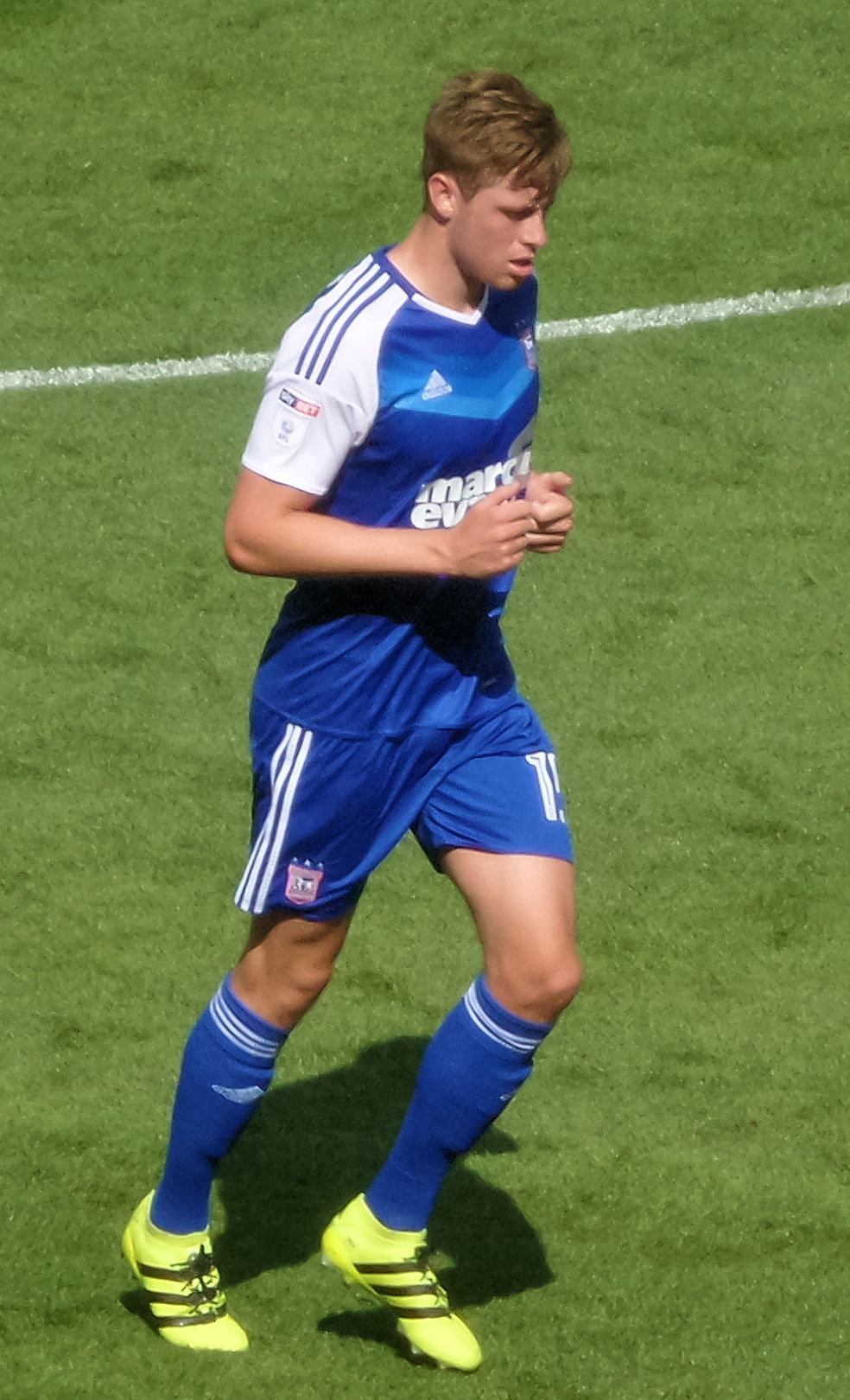
Webster playing for Ipswich Town in 2016

On 6 June 2016, Webster moved to EFL Championship club Ipswich Town from Portsmouth for an undisclosed fee, in a deal which also saw defender Matt Clarke go in the opposite direction. He made his debut for the club on 6 August, starting in a 4–2 home win over Barnsley at Portman Road. He scored his first goal for Ipswich against Birmingham City on 13 December 2016. Webster made 24 appearances in all competitions during the 2016–17 season, scoring once.

Webster made his first appearance of the 2017–18 season on the opening day of the season in a 1–0 win over Birmingham City. He formed a defensive partnership with club captain Luke Chambers over the course of the season, making made 29 appearances in all competitions during his second season at the club.

=== Bristol City ===
On 28 June 2018, Webster transferred to fellow Football League Championship club Bristol City for an initial fee of £3.5 million rising up to £8 million.

=== Brighton & Hove Albion ===
On 3 August 2019, Brighton & Hove Albion completed the signing of Webster, signing him on a four-year deal for an undisclosed fee. He made his debut 25 days later on 27 August in a 2–1 away win against Bristol Rovers in the EFL Cup. Webster made his Premier League debut and league debut for the Seagulls starting in the 4–0 away loss to defending champions Manchester City on 31 August. Webster scored his first goal for Brighton and his first in the top flight on 19 October in a 2–1 defeat to Aston Villa at Villa Park. Throughout Webster's debut season for Brighton he kept his competition in Shane Duffy out of the starting line-up on a regular basis, starting in all 31 league appearances he played in, scoring three goals, assisting one and recording five clean sheets.

Webster played in Brighton's 1–0 away victory over defending champions Liverpool on 3 February, claiming their first league win at Anfield since 1982. He scored his first goal of the season, scoring the equaliser – coming from 2–0 down – in an eventual 3–2 home victory over champions Manchester City on 18 May, with fans returning to football.

Webster signed a new five-year contract with Brighton on 2 August 2021, extending his tenure at the club until 2026. He went off with a hamstring injury in an eventual 1–0 away win over Brentford on 11 September, which ruled out for four matches. He scored his first goal of the season on his return on 27 October, with Brighton's first equaliser in an eventual penalty shoot-out loss away at Leicester City in the fourth round of the EFL Cup. He made his return to Premier League action on 6 November, coming on as a 75th-minute substitute for Tariq Lamptey in the 1–1 home draw against Newcastle United. After making a few appearances since his return to fitness Webster suffered a further injury blow as he was forced off with a calf injury in the first half of a 1–1 away draw at West Ham on 1 December. It was revealed that he would be out until Brentford's visit to Falmer Stadium on 26 December at the earliest. Webster did make his return in this match, playing the whole match helping Brighton end their 12-game winless run by beating Brentford 2–0. Webster scored his second goal of the season – and first league goal, a header from an Alexis Mac Allister corner scoring the equaliser in the 1–1 home draw against European champions Chelsea on 18 January 2022, in which he captained the side in Lewis Dunk's absence. Webster suffered a further injury with his groin in mid February and spent almost two months out injured making his return as a substitute in a 2–1 away win over Arsenal on 9 April, ending Brighton's seven match winless streak. On 7 May, Webster came on as a substitute to see off Brighton's biggest ever top flight victory, a 4–0 win over Manchester United.

On 1 October 2022, after Robert Sánchez misjudged a cross into the box, the ball bounced off Webster into Brighton's net, before Leandro Trossard scored the decisive equaliser in the eventual 3–3 away draw at Liverpool. The defender suffered with injuries throughout the season. On 19 March 2023, Webster assisted Solly March's powerful header who made a diagonal run into the box as Brighton went on to reach the FA Cup semi-final after winning 5–0 at home to League Two side Grimsby Town. He made the starting eleven at Wembley on 23 April, and after a goalless 120 minutes of play he scored Brighton's sixth penalty, as they were defeated in the shootout against Manchester United to be denied a place in the final. On 4 May, Webster helped keep a clean sheet to deny Manchester United where Brighton got their revenge, with Alexis Mac Allister scoring a 99th-minute penalty to claim a 1–0 home victory and all three points. He made 27 Premier League appearances throughout the season as Brighton finished in sixth place, qualifying for the 2023–24 UEFA Europa League, the club's first ever European qualification.

== International career ==
The same week he made his debut for Portsmouth, Webster was called up to the England U17s for a friendly tournament in Portugal.

In October 2012, Webster was called up to the England U19 squad, but his manager Michael Appleton blocked the requests from FA due to player shortage in Portsmouth. Later in the month, he was called up to the England U18s.

On 24 October 2012, Webster made his national team debut at under-18 level in a 2–0 win against Italy.

On 13 November 2012, Webster made his England Under 19s debut in a 1–0 win over Finland, coming as a second-half substitute for Jack Stephens. On 24 May 2013, Webster made his third appearance for the U19s coming on as a substitute in a match against Georgia.

== Career statistics ==
As of match played 25 May 2025

Appearances and goals by club, season and competition
Club	Season	League			FA Cup		League Cup		Europe		Other		Total	
Club	Season	Division	Apps	Goals	Apps	Goals	Apps	Goals	Apps	Goals	Apps	Goals	Apps	Goals
Portsmouth	2011–12	Championship	3	0	0	0	0	0	—		—		3	0
Portsmouth	2012–13	League One	18	0	1	0	1	0	—		1 (Note: Appearance in Football League Trophy)	0	21	0
Portsmouth	2013–14	League Two	4	2	0	0	0	0	—		0	0	4	2
Portsmouth	2014–15	League Two	15	1	0	0	2	0	—		1	0	18	1
Portsmouth	2015–16	League Two	27	2	5	0	2	0	—		1	0	35	2
Portsmouth	Total		67	5	6	0	5	0	—		3	0	81	5
Aldershot Town (loan)	2013–14	Conference Premier	24	0	0	0	—		—		4 (Note: Appearances in FA Trophy)	0	28	0
Ipswich Town	2016–17	Championship	23	1	1	0	0	0	—		—		24	1
Ipswich Town	2017–18	Championship	28	0	0	0	1	0	—		—		29	0
Ipswich Town	Total		51	1	1	0	1	0	—		—		53	1
Bristol City	2018–19	Championship	44	3	2	0	1	0	—		—		47	3
Brighton & Hove Albion	2019–20	Premier League	31	3	1	0	1	0	—		—		33	3
Brighton & Hove Albion	2020–21	Premier League	29	1	2	0	0	0	—		—		31	1
Brighton & Hove Albion	2021–22	Premier League	22	2	1	0	1	1	—		—		24	3
Brighton & Hove Albion	2022–23	Premier League	27	0	4	0	1	0	—		—		32	0
Brighton & Hove Albion	2023–24	Premier League	15	0	2	0	0	0	1 (Note: Appearance in UEFA Europa League)	0	—		18	0
Brighton & Hove Albion	2024–25	Premier League	14	0	4	0	2	1	—		—		20	1
Brighton & Hove Albion	2025–26	Premier League	0	0	0	0	0	0	—		—		0	0
Brighton & Hove Albion	Total		138	6	14	0	5	2	1	0	—		158	8
Career total			323	15	23	0	12	2	1	0	7	0	366	17

== Honours ==
Individual

- Bristol City Player of the Year: 2018–19
