= Facundo Buonanotte =

Argentine footballer (born 2004)

Personal information
- Full name: Facundo Valentín Buonanotte
- Date of birth: 23 December 2004 (age 21)
- Place of birth: Pérez, Argentina
- Height: 1.76 m (5 ft 9 in)
- Positions: Attacking midfielder; winger

Team information
- Current team: Elche (on loan from Brighton & Hove Albion)
- Number: 10

Youth career
- 2014–2022: Rosario Central

Senior career*
Years	Team	Apps	(Gls)
2022–2023	Rosario Central	32	(4)
2023–	Brighton & Hove Albion	40	(4)
2024–2025	→ Leicester City (loan)	31	(5)
2025–2026	→ Chelsea (loan)	1	(0)
2026	→ Leeds United (loan)	3	(0)
2026–	→ Elche (loan)	8	(1)

International career^{‡}
2022–2023	Argentina U20	6	(1)
2023–2024	Argentina	2	(0)
- * Club domestic league appearances and goals as of 8 November 2026 ‡ National team caps and goals as of 03:18, 23 March 2024 (UTC)

Facundo Valentín Buonanotte (born 23 December 2004) is an Argentine professional footballer who plays as an attacking midfielder or winger for La Liga club Elche, on loan from Premier League club Brighton & Hove Albion.

== Club career ==
=== Rosario Central ===
Buonanotte is a product of the youth academy of Rosario Central since the age of ten. He made his professional debut as a substitute for Rosario Central against Arsenal de Sarandí on 11 February 2022. In a Copa Argentina penalty shoot-out victory against Sol de Mayo on 13 May 2022, he scored the game-winning penalty. The next day, on 14 May 2022, Buonanotte signed his first professional contract with Rosario Central. He scored his first senior goal in a 1–0 Argentine Primera División victory against Sarmiento on 8 July 2022.

=== Brighton & Hove Albion ===
On 1 January 2023, Buonanotte joined the academy of Premier League club Brighton & Hove Albion for an estimated fee of £5.3m, with an additional £5.3m dependent on objectives being met. He made his debut for the Seagulls on 4 February, coming on as a 75th-minute substitute replacing Tariq Lamptey as Brighton went on to beat AFC Bournemouth with a 87th-minute Kaoru Mitoma goal. Buonanotte made his first start for Brighton on 28 February, playing 69 minutes of the 1–0 away victory against Stoke City of the Championship with Brighton advancing to the FA Cup quarter-finals. Buonanotte claimed an assist four days later, setting up Danny Welbeck's strike, the last of the game in the 4–0 home victory against West Ham United. The then-18-year-old Argentine gained his first Premier League start on 26 April, where he scored his first goal for the club, opening the score in the eventual 3–1 away loss against Nottingham Forest.

==== Loan spells ====
On 10 August 2024, Buonanotte went on loan to fellow Premier League club Leicester City for the 2024–25 season. He made his Leicester debut on 19 August 2024 in a 1–1 home draw against Tottenham Hotspur. His first goal came on 31 August in a 2–1 defeat against Aston Villa.

On 1 September 2025, Buonanotte joined Chelsea on a season-long loan. He made his Chelsea debut on 13 September in a 2–2 home draw against Brentford. He scored his first and only Chelsea goal in a 2–1 victory over Lincoln City in the EFL Cup. Buonanotte returned to Brighton on 15 January 2026, and subsequently joined Leeds United on a different loan deal until the end of the season.

On 7 August 2026, Buonanotte joined La Liga side Elche on loan for the 2026–27 season.

== International career ==
Buonanotte was called up to the Argentina national under-20 football team for the 2022 Maurice Revello Tournament in France. In January 2023, he was once again called up to the national under-20 football team ahead of the 2023 South American Championship.

On 3 March 2023, Buonanotte received his first call-up for the Argentina senior squad for friendly matches against Panama and Curaçao. He made his senior debut on 19 June in a 2–0 away victory against Indonesia.

== Personal life ==
Buonanotte was born and raised in Argentina to a family of Italian descent. He holds dual citizenship of both Argentina and Italy.

== Career statistics ==
=== Club ===
As of match played 8 November 2026

Appearances and goals by club, season and competition
Club	Season	League			National cup (Note: Includes Copa Argentina, FA Cup, Copa del Rey)		League cup (Note: Includes EFL Cup)		Continental		Total	
Club	Season	Division	Apps	Goals	Apps	Goals	Apps	Goals	Apps	Goals	Apps	Goals
Rosario Central	2022	Argentine Primera División	32	4	2	0	0	0	—		34	4
Brighton & Hove Albion	2022–23	Premier League	13	1	1	0	—		—		14	1
Brighton & Hove Albion	2023–24	Premier League	27	3	3	1	1	0	5 (Note: Appearances in UEFA Europa League)	0	36	4
Brighton & Hove Albion	Total		40	4	4	1	1	0	5	0	50	5
Leicester City (loan)	2024–25	Premier League	31	5	2	1	2	0	—		35	6
Chelsea (loan)	2025–26	Premier League	1	0	1	0	3	1	3 (Note: Appearances in UEFA Champions League)	0	8	1
Leeds United (loan)	2025–26	Premier League	3	0	1	0	—		—		4	0
Elche (loan)	2026–27	La Liga	8	1	1	0	—		—		9	1
Career total			115	14	11	2	6	1	8	0	140	17

=== International ===
As of match played 22 March 2024

Appearances and goals by national team and year
National team	Year	Apps	Goals
Argentina	2023	1	0
Argentina	2024	1	0
Total		2	0
