= Solly March =

English footballer (born 1994)

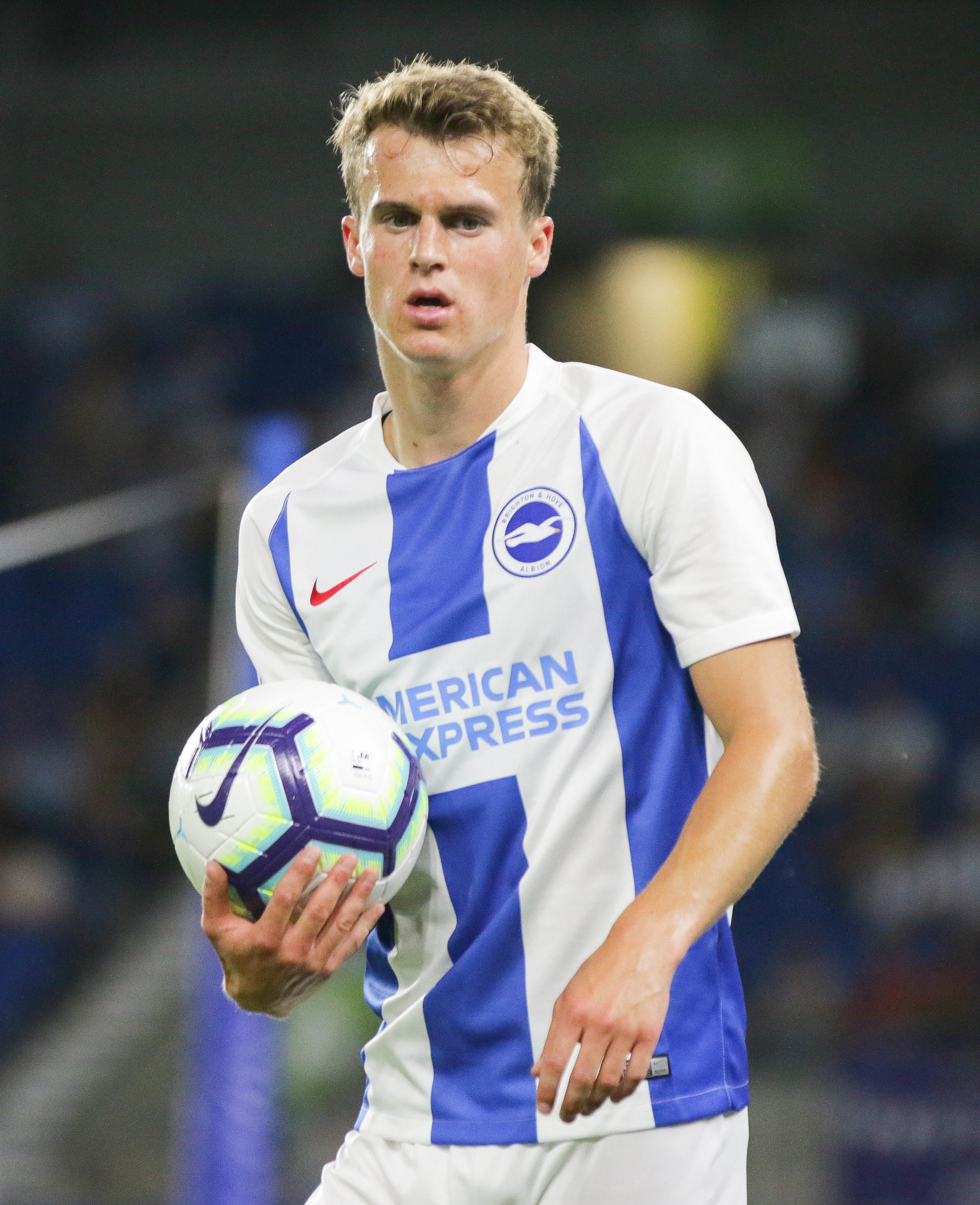
- March playing for Brighton & Hove Albion in 2018

Personal information
- Full name: Solomon Benjamin March
- Date of birth: 20 July 1994 (age 32)
- Place of birth: Eastbourne, England
- Height: 5 ft 11 in (1.80 m)
- Positions: Right winger; wing-back

Youth career
- 2005–2007: Crystal Palace
- 2007–2010: Eastbourne Borough
- 2010–2011: Lewes
- 2011–2013: Brighton & Hove Albion

Senior career*
Years	Team	Apps	(Gls)
2011	Lewes	1	(0)
2013–2026	Brighton & Hove Albion	269	(21)

International career
2014	England U20	4	(0)
2015–2017	England U21	3	(1)
- * Club domestic league appearances and goals as of 1 July 2026

Solomon Benjamin March (born 20 July 1994) is an English professional footballer who plays as a right winger.

== Early life ==
March was born in Eastbourne, East Sussex. His father, Steve, had been an apprentice footballer at Brighton & Hove Albion in the late 1980s. March attended secondary school at Ringmer Community College and St Bede's School, Eastbourne. Between 2008 and 2012 March played cricket for Hellingly C.C.

== Club career ==
=== Lewes ===
March played at Crystal Palace between the ages of 11 and 13 and then switched from Eastbourne Borough to fellow East Sussex club Lewes as a youth player. Lewes were playing in the Isthmian League Premier Division, and the 17-year-old March made his first-team debut on 10 September 2011, coming on in the 86th minute as a substitute in the 4–1 home victory over Aveley, when he was offered a scholarship by Brighton & Hove Albion.

=== Brighton & Hove Albion ===
==== 2011–13: Early days at Brighton ====
March signed a three-year contract with Brighton in December 2011. At the time of his transfer it was reported by the Brighton Argus that March had also been offered a contract with Millwall and a trial with Newcastle United. Lewes manager Steve King suggested that March had been attracted to Brighton because of the style of football they were playing under manager Gus Poyet and because the move to another East Sussex club would allow him to remain close to his family.

While progressing through Brighton's youth squad, March quickly made an impact for the side and scored a hat–trick, in a 3–1 win over Stevenage's youth squad on 18 February 2012. While still a member of Brighton's development squad, 2013 saw the beginning of March's senior career. During the last half of the 2012–13 season, March made the bench for three senior Championship games but did not make an appearance. March impressed in Brighton's youth squad, earning himself the team's Young Player of the Year Award 2013 and a contract extension until 2015.

==== 2013–14: Debut in Brighton's first team ====
He then performed well in pre-season friendlies with the first team prior to the start of the 2013–14 season; highlighted with a "superb" goal against Norwich City. March was a named substitute in five of the first six games in the 2013–14 season and was substituted on in the 85th and 91st minutes against Derby County and Burnley respectively, thus creating his debut in Brighton's first team. Around November, March's first team opportunities became limited, leading to rumours that he was expected to be loaned out. However, the move never happened and he stayed at the club.

March scored his first senior goal for Brighton in an FA Cup fourth round tie at Port Vale on 25 January 2014. The game also saw Rohan Ince and Jon Obika score their first goals for the club in a 3–1 win. For the rest of the season, March was given a handful of first team opportunities, resulting him making 28 appearances in all competitions. Because of this, March signed a new four-year deal with the "Seagulls" in April 2014.

==== 2014–15: Period of injuries ====
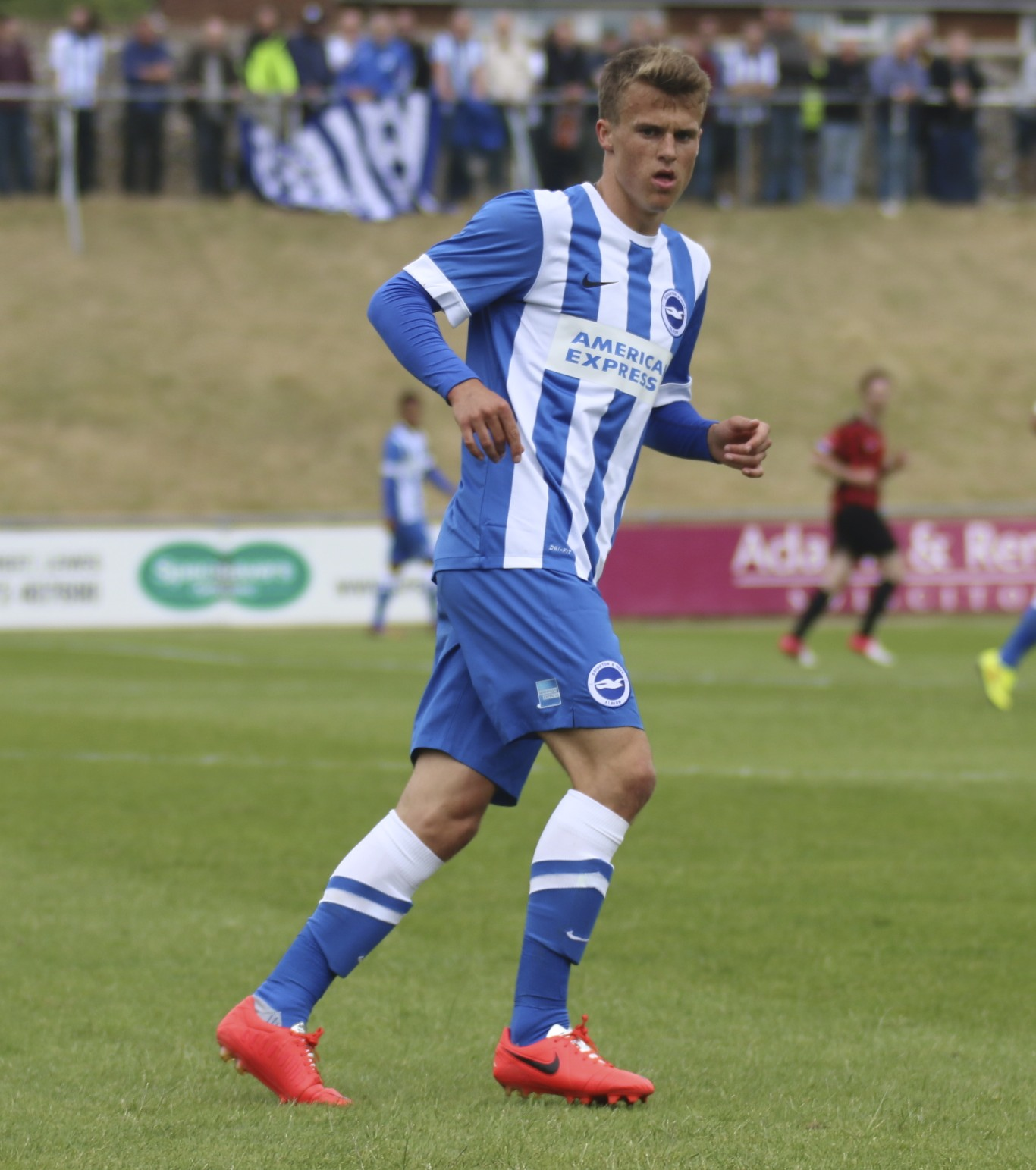
March playing for Brighton & Hove Albion in 2014

To begin the 2014–15 season, March worked on improving his match fitness. However, his progress stalled as he suffered a lower back problem that would rule him out for several months. After returning to training from injury, March made his first appearance of the season, coming on as a second-half substitute, in a 2–1 loss against Fulham on 29 November 2014. In the club's second meeting against Fulham thirty days later, on 29 December 2014, he scored his first goal of the season, in a 2–0 win. This was followed up by setting up a goal for Rohan Ince, who scored the only goal of the game, in a win over Charlton Athletic.

March suffered a calf injury during a 3–2 loss against Nottingham Forest on 7 February 2015, in what turned out to be his last appearance of the season. Initially out for weeks, March was eventually for the rest of the season. Despite this, he went on to make 13 appearances and scoring once in all competitions.

==== 2015–16: First team regular ====
In the 2015–16 season, March returned to the first team from injury and started the season well when he set up a goal for Kazenga LuaLua, in a 1–0 win over Nottingham Forest. Since returning from injury, March regained his first team place at the club, mostly in the right–midfield position. He then scored his first goal of the season, in a 2–1 win over Leeds United on 17 October 2015. He went on to score two goals later in the season against MK Dons and Birmingham City. His performance throughout November earned him a nomination for November's Player of the Month but lost out to Daryl Murphy. However, on 12 December 2015, March suffered a season ending knee injury during a 2–2 draw against Derby County. Despite this, March made 17 appearances and scored three times for Brighton in the 2015–16 season.

==== 2016–17: Prolific season ====
At the beginning of the 2016–17 season, March remained sidelined out of the first team after returning from a knee injury. He returned to action from injury in a reserve match against Aston Villa's U23 side on 22 August 2016. After playing in the reserve side for the first few months after returning from injury, March signed a contract extension with Brighton, keeping him at the club until 2020. March made his return to the first team on 5 November 2016, coming on as a second–half substitute in a 2–0 win over Bristol City.

March scored his first goal of the season in a 3–3 draw against Brentford on 5 February 2017. This was followed up by setting up two goals in a 4–1 win over Burton Albion. March went on to score two more goals throughout the season, against Rotherham United and Wigan Athletic, with the Wigan goal on 17 April 2017 being the decider in Brighton's promotion. Since returning to the first team from injury, March began to regain his first team in the midfield position and played a key role in the side gaining promotion to the Premier League. At the end of the 2016–17 season, March went on to make 24 appearances and scoring three times in all competitions.

==== 2017–18: Continued success ====
In the 2017–18 season, March made his Premier League debut, where he started and played for 75 minutes before being substituted, in a 2–0 loss against Manchester City. March scored his first Premier League goal for Brighton on 15 September 2017, the opening goal in a 2–1 away defeat to AFC Bournemouth.

==== 2018–19: Consistent performances ====
On 16 December 2018 March scored his 10th goal for the Albion in a 2–1 home defeat to Chelsea in which was his first Premier League goal at Falmer Stadium. On 17 March 2019, Jürgen Locadia scored in the FA Cup quarter final away against Millwall. His goal gave Brighton a lifeline putting them just a goal behind at The Den. A few minutes later March scored a last gasp free kick making it 2–2 and to take it to extra time. The game stayed level throughout extra time and Brighton went to win on penalties 5–4 (in which Locadia and March both scored in) to take them to Wembley.

==== 2019–20: Continued consistent performances ====
March played in Brighton's opening match of the 2019–20 season in which they thrashed Watford 3–0 away from home. On 20 June 2020, March came on as a substitute in Brighton's first match after the league suspension due to the COVID-19 pandemic in which they recorded a 2–1 home victory over Arsenal.

==== 2020–21: Injury struggle ====
After 21 months without a goal, March found the net on 26 September 2020 at home to Manchester United, taking it to 2–2 in the 5th minute of stoppage time. However, Bruno Fernandes scored a penalty after the final whistle awarded by VAR with United winning 3–2. He scored his second goal of the season on 21 November – first time he's ever hit more than one goal in a Premier League season – hitting in a winner from outside the box in a 2–1 away win against Aston Villa. March played in Brighton's 1–0 away victory over defending champions Liverpool on 3 February 2021 claiming their first league win at Anfield since 1982, going off injured in the second half. It was revealed that March would have to undergo knee surgery due to the injury and missed the remainder of the season. Despite this, he was in new contract talks with the club.

==== 2021–22: New contract and impressive performances ====
March returned to action after injury in the pre-season of the 2021–22 campaign playing in all three friendlies, a draw at Rangers, a win away at Luton Town where he set up Albion summer signing Enock Mwepu's goal and a home loss against Getafe. He made his first Premier League appearance since February on 14 August, playing the whole match helping Albion come from behind to win 2–1 away at Burnley in the opening game of the season. On 23 August, it was announced that March had signed a new contract committing his future with the club until June 2024, with Graham Potter being "really pleased to see Solly commit his future here."

March made his 200th league appearance for Brighton in a 1–0 home defeat against Wolverhampton Wanderers on 15 December. On 5 February 2022, in a FA Cup fourth round away fixture at Tottenham, March conceded an own goal, deflecting Emerson Royal's cross and catching Robert Sánchez off guard, with Tottenham's second in a 3–1 loss. He played in the 4–0 home thrashing of Manchester United on 7 May, with Brighton's biggest ever top flight victory ending United's 2022–23 UEFA Champions League hopes. March assisted Joël Veltman's equaliser against West Ham United in the last game of the season, in the eventual 3–1 home victory, helping Brighton achieve their highest ever top flight finish, finishing ninth.

==== 2022–23: Continued impressive performances ====
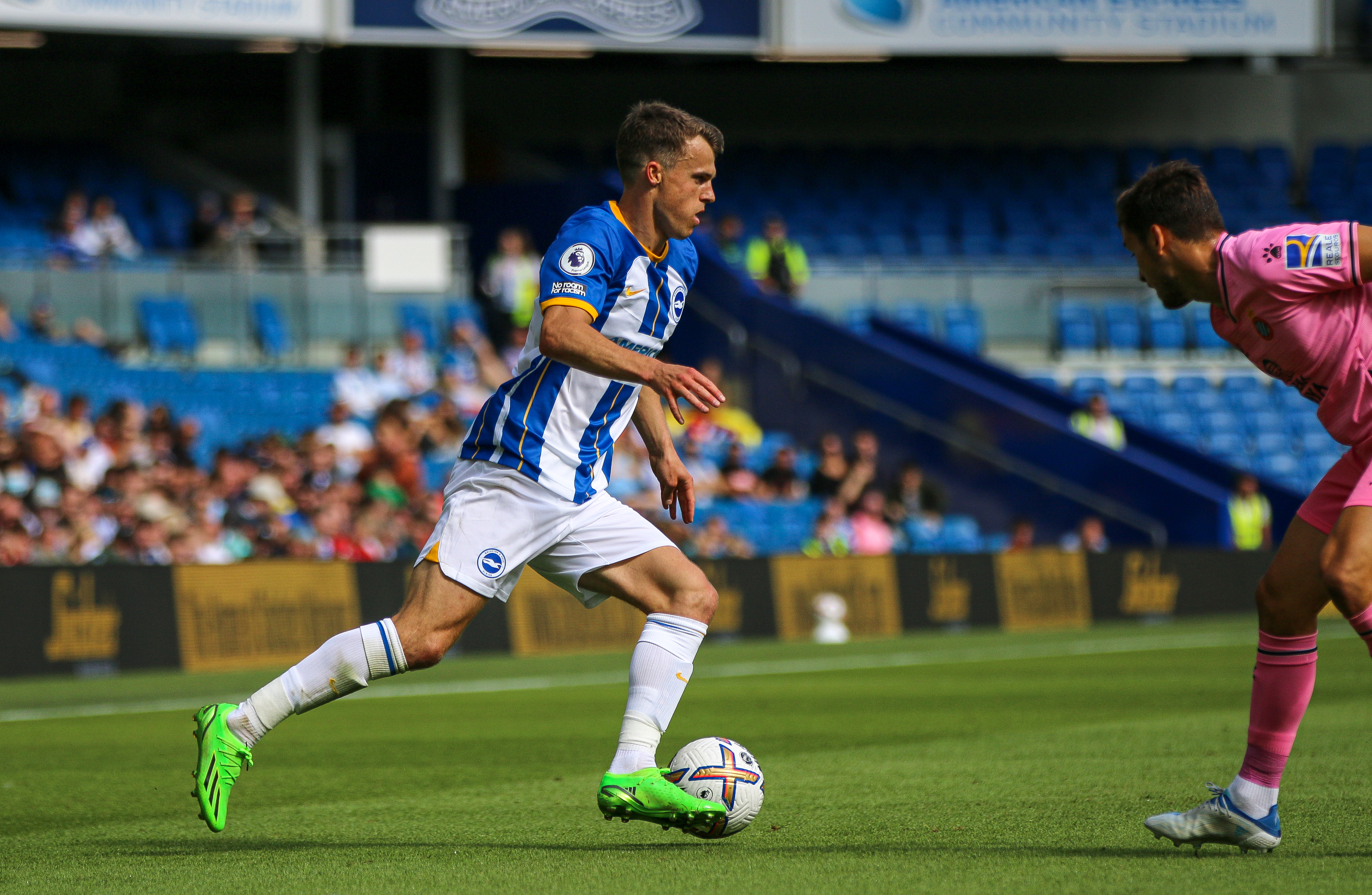
March playing for Brighton in July 2022

On 21 December 2022, March fired over his spot kick in penalty shootout away at Charlton Athletic in the last 16 of the EFL Cup to miss the opportunity of taking Brighton to the quarters; eventually losing to the League One side. Five days later on Boxing Day, he assisted Adam Lallana's opener before scoring his first goal since 21 November 2020, thumping in a shot from 20 yards, adding Brighton's third in the eventual 3–1 victory away at Southampton. On 3 January 2023, March scored his second goal of the season in the 4–1 away win over Everton. On 14 January, he scored his first career brace, scoring two goals in seven minutes while also flicking the ball with his head to set up Danny Welbeck's first league goal of the season in the 3–0 home win over Liverpool. This took his season tally to four goals, his most in a single season.

March scored his fifth goal of the season on 11 February, putting Brighton in front against his former youth club Crystal Palace in a 1–1 away draw. He was awarded with the goal on 11 March in the 2–2 away draw against Leeds United, with the goal originally going down as a Jack Harrison own goal. Four days later, March netted his seventh of the season, scoring again against Palace with the only goal of the game at Falmer Stadium. On 17 March, March signed a new contract, committing him to Brighton until at least June 2026 with an option for an additional year. Two days later, he scored his eighth goal of the season, finishing off a Adam Webster ball with a powerful header, in a 5–0 home FA Cup quarter-final win over League Two side Grimsby Town. March missed a second penalty shootout spot kick of the season on 23 April, this time at Wembley in the FA Cup semi-final against Manchester United, firing over from 12-yards, proving costly and leaving March in tears as United progressed into the final. March picked up a hamstring injury on 8 May in Brighton's 5–1 home defeat against Everton. March's successful season helped Brighton qualify for Europe for the first time in the club's history after defeating Southampton on 21 May. March was absent in the fixture due to his injury sustained against Everton.

==== 2023–24: Albion's European debut and injury struggles ====
March scored the opening goal in Brighton's first match of the season on 12 August 2023, their first of four in the 4–1 home win over newly promoted Luton Town. A week later, March scored a brace with Brighton winning 4–1 again, this time away at Wolverhampton Wanderers. On 21 September, he made his UEFA Europa League debut in a 3–2 home defeat against AEK Athens. On 21 October 2023, March sustained a knee injury in a 2–1 defeat against Manchester City, which sidelined him for over a year.

==== 2024–26: Prolonged injury setbacks and departure ====
In April 2025, March suffered another knee injury that ruled him out of action for 11 months.

March eventually made his return on 1 March 2026, coming on as a late substitute in a 2–1 victory over Nottingham Forest. In May 2026, it was announced that March would leave Brighton at the end of the 2025–26 season, ending his 13-year tenure with the club.

== International career ==
March was named by Gareth Southgate as a forward in the England under-21 squad in May 2014. The squad would play a 2015 UEFA European Under-21 Championship qualification match against Wales and at least four games at the Toulon Tournament. March had not previously played for England at any level. He made his England under-20 debut when starting in a 3–0 win over Qatar on 22 May. On 27 March 2017, March scored his first international goal in an under-21 friendly against Denmark with a shot from outside the box in a 4–0 away victory.

== Style of play ==
March originally played on the wing either in midfield or as part of a forward line. Steve King, his former manager at Lewes, described March as a "technically very good" player who "has bags of energy, is a box-to-box player, has a good left foot, a good shot, he sees things early and the weight of his passes is very good." Under Graham Potter as head coach at Brighton, March had predominantly been used as a left wing-back. However, when Roberto De Zerbi succeeded Potter, March began to play a more attacking role, crediting confidence and describing the Italian manager as the best he has played under. March broke his goal scoring record for a single season in De Zerbi's debut campaign.

== Personal life ==
In May 2017, following Brighton & Hove Albion's promotion to the Premier League, March became engaged to girlfriend Amelia Goldman after proposing to her in Dubai. March and Goldman married in November 2017, and their first child, a daughter, was born in August 2019. They have subsequently had two more daughters.

== Career statistics ==
As of match played 24 May 2026

Appearances and goals by club, season and competition
Club	Season	League			FA Cup		League Cup		Europe		Other		Total	
Club	Season	Division	Apps	Goals	Apps	Goals	Apps	Goals	Apps	Goals	Apps	Goals	Apps	Goals
Lewes	2011–12	Isthmian League; Premier Division	1	0	0	0	—		—		0	0	1	0
Brighton & Hove Albion	2012–13	Championship	0	0	0	0	0	0	—		0	0	0	0
Brighton & Hove Albion	2013–14	Championship	23	0	4	1	0	0	—		1 (Note: Appearance in Championship play-offs)	0	28	1
Brighton & Hove Albion	2014–15	Championship	11	1	2	0	0	0	—		—		13	1
Brighton & Hove Albion	2015–16	Championship	16	3	0	0	1	0	—		0	0	17	3
Brighton & Hove Albion	2016–17	Championship	25	3	2	0	0	0	—		—		27	3
Brighton & Hove Albion	2017–18	Premier League	36	1	3	0	1	0	—		—		40	1
Brighton & Hove Albion	2018–19	Premier League	35	1	2	1	0	0	—		—		37	2
Brighton & Hove Albion	2019–20	Premier League	19	0	0	0	0	0	—		—		19	0
Brighton & Hove Albion	2020–21	Premier League	21	2	2	1	0	0	—		—		23	3
Brighton & Hove Albion	2021–22	Premier League	31	0	2	0	0	0	—		—		33	0
Brighton & Hove Albion	2022–23	Premier League	33	7	4	1	2	0	—		—		39	8
Brighton & Hove Albion	2023–24	Premier League	7	3	0	0	1	0	2 (Note: Appearances in UEFA Europa League)	0	—		10	3
Brighton & Hove Albion	2024–25	Premier League	8	0	2	1	0	0	—		—		10	1
Brighton & Hove Albion	2025–26	Premier League	4	0	0	0	0	0	—		—		4	0
Brighton & Hove Albion	Total		269	21	23	5	5	0	1	0	2	0	300	26
Brighton & Hove Albion U23	2016–17	—			—		—		—		1 (Note: Appearance in EFL Trophy)	0	1	0
Career total			270	21	23	5	5	0	1	0	3	0	301	26

== Honours ==
Brighton & Hove Albion

- EFL Championship runner-up: 2016–17
