= Joël Veltman =

Dutch footballer (born 1992)

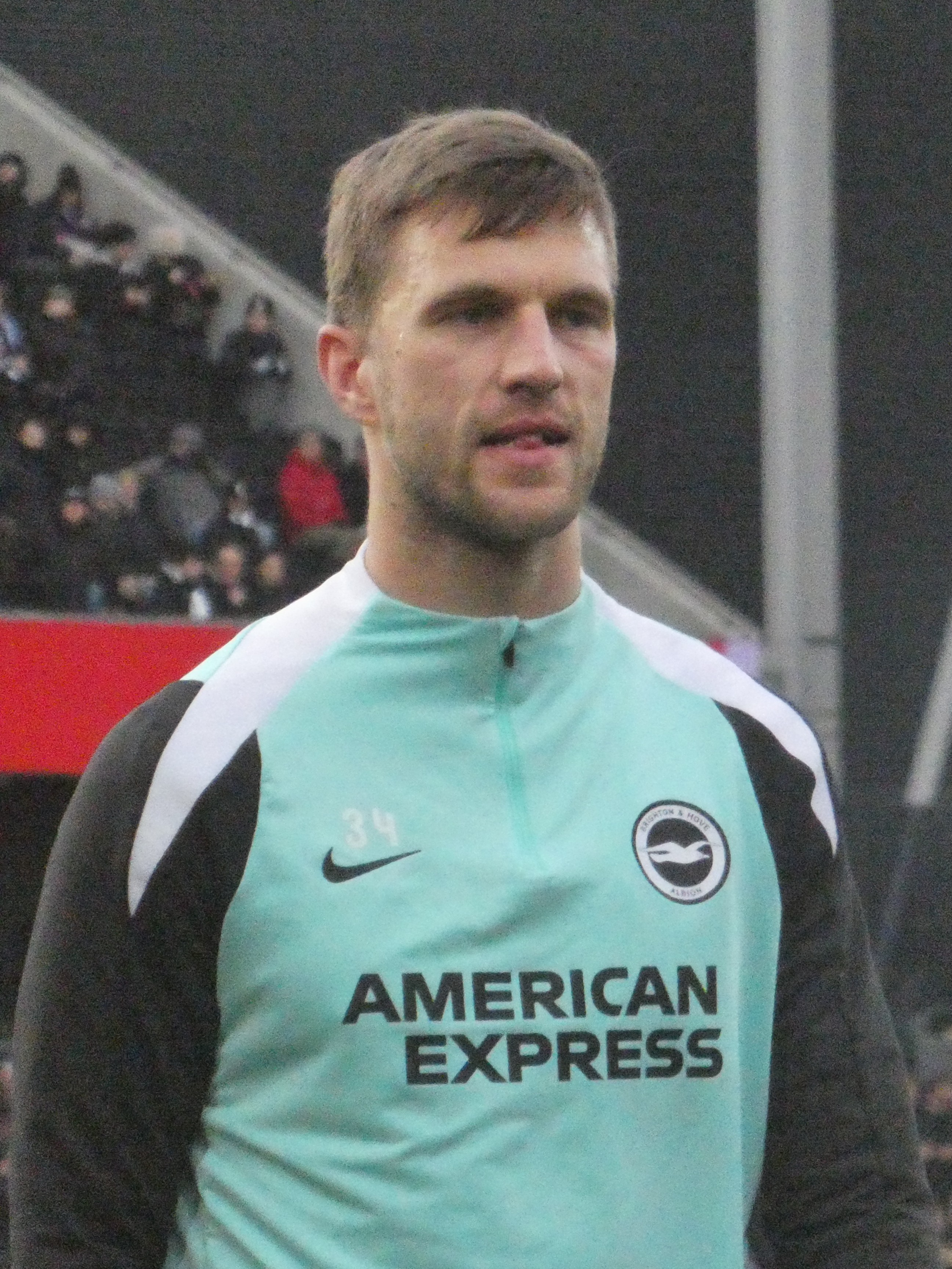
- Veltman with Brighton & Hove Albion in 2026

Personal information
- Full name: Joël Ivo Veltman
- Date of birth: 15 January 1992 (age 34)
- Place of birth: IJmuiden, Netherlands
- Height: 1.84 m (6 ft 0 in)
- Positions: Right-back; centre-back

Team information
- Current team: West Ham United
- Number: 34

Youth career
- VV IJmuiden
- 2001–2012: Ajax

Senior career*
Years	Team	Apps	(Gls)
2012–2020	Ajax	179	(10)
2020–2026	Brighton & Hove Albion	165	(5)
2026–	West Ham United	13	(0)

International career
2009	Netherlands U17	7	(0)
2010–2011	Netherlands U19	3	(1)
2012–2013	Netherlands U20	9	(0)
2011	Netherlands B	1	(0)
2013–2021	Netherlands	28	(2)
Medal record
Representing Netherlands
FIFA World Cup
Third place	2014
UEFA European Under-17 Championship
Runner-up	Germany 2009	U-17 Team
- * Club domestic league appearances and goals as of 21 November 2026 (UTC)

Joël Ivo Veltman (born 15 January 1992) is a Dutch professional footballer who plays as a right-back or centre-back for EFL Championship club West Ham United.

A product of the Ajax youth academy, Veltman made 246 appearances for the Amsterdam club before moving on to Brighton in July 2020 for a £900,000 fee on a three-year deal.

Veltman has won 28 caps for the Netherlands national team since his debut in November 2013.

== Club career ==
=== Ajax ===
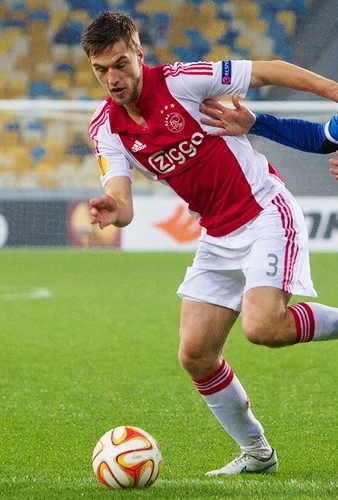
Veltman playing for Ajax in 2014

Veltman began his football career in the youth teams of VV IJmuiden in his hometown of IJmuiden before moving to Ajax in 2001, where he went through the youth ranks of the club. While playing for the Ajax A1 youth squad in 2011–12, Veltman helped his side to win the Nike Eredivisie league title, as well finishing as runners-up to Inter Milan in the NextGen Series (the UEFA Champions League equivalent for under-20 teams) after losing on penalties (5–3) following a 1–1 deadlock after extra time.

He made his official debut for the Ajax first team on 19 August 2012 in an away match against NEC in Nijmegen, entering as a substitute for Mitchell Dijks in the 79th minute; the match ended in a 6–1 away win for Ajax. Following a successful starting season with the Ajax first team, helping his side secure its third-straight national title and his personal first, on 6 June 2013 it was announced that Veltman had extended his contract with Ajax for another four years, keeping him with the club until the summer of 2017.

On 5 August 2013, Veltman played in the Eerste Divisie debut of the newly promoted reserves team Jong Ajax at the start of the season. Substituted off in the 89th minute of a 2–0 home win, due to a sustained injury, Veltman found himself sidelined for the next two months. He returned from injury on 30 September 2013 in another match for Jong Ajax, this time against Volendam, where he scored his first professional goal in the 3–2 loss at the Sportpark De Toekomst, netting the opener in the seventh minute. On 22 October 2013, Veltman made his continental debut for the first team when he replaced injured first-choice centre-back Niklas Moisander in the 2013–14 UEFA Champions League group stage match against Celtic. The away match at Celtic Park ended in a 2–1 loss for the Amsterdam side.

In April 2018, Veltman tore his ACL in a match against VVV-Venlo. After a long recovery he returned to first-team action in February 2019.

=== Brighton and Hove Albion ===
==== 2020–21 season: Debut campaign ====
On 29 July 2020, Premier League club Brighton and Hove Albion announced that they had completed the signing of Veltman from Ajax on a three-year deal after activating the release clause in his contract, valued at £900,000. Veltman chose to wear the number 34 jersey, as a tribute to former Ajax teammate Abdelhak Nouri, who collapsed during a friendly in 2017 and went into an induced coma. Veltman made his debut for the Sussex side on 17 September 2020 starting in a 4–0 home victory over Portsmouth in the EFL Cup. Veltman made his league debut for Brighton on 3 October, coming on as a substitute at half time for Tariq Lamptey in an eventual 4–2 away defeat at Everton. He scored his first goal for the Sussex side, scoring an equaliser in an eventual 2–1 home defeat against bitter rivals Crystal Palace on 22 February 2021.

==== 2021–22 season ====
In the first Crystal Palace rivalry match of the 2021–22 season away at Crystal Palace on 27 September, from a poor Vicente Guaita goal kick, Veltman hit a long ball up to Neal Maupay in which he lobbed the keeper and scored a 90+5th equaliser ending the match at 1–1, taking a point back to the south coast. On 7 May 2022, Veltman played the whole match of the 4–0 humiliation of Manchester United, helping Brighton to their biggest ever top flight victory. On 22 May, the last game of the season, Veltman scored his second goal for the Albion, the equaliser in an eventual 3–1 home victory over West Ham. The win secured Brighton's highest ever top flight finish, finishing in ninth place. Veltman revealed that he felt the 2021–22 season was his best of his career, earning the nickname Mr Consistent while also finishing as the runner-up in Albions' Supporters' Player of the Season award. He spoke of his form saying "It probably is my best season in terms of how I have played. The Premier League is the toughest competition in the world. I can say myself that I did well, I can be proud."

==== 2022–23 season ====
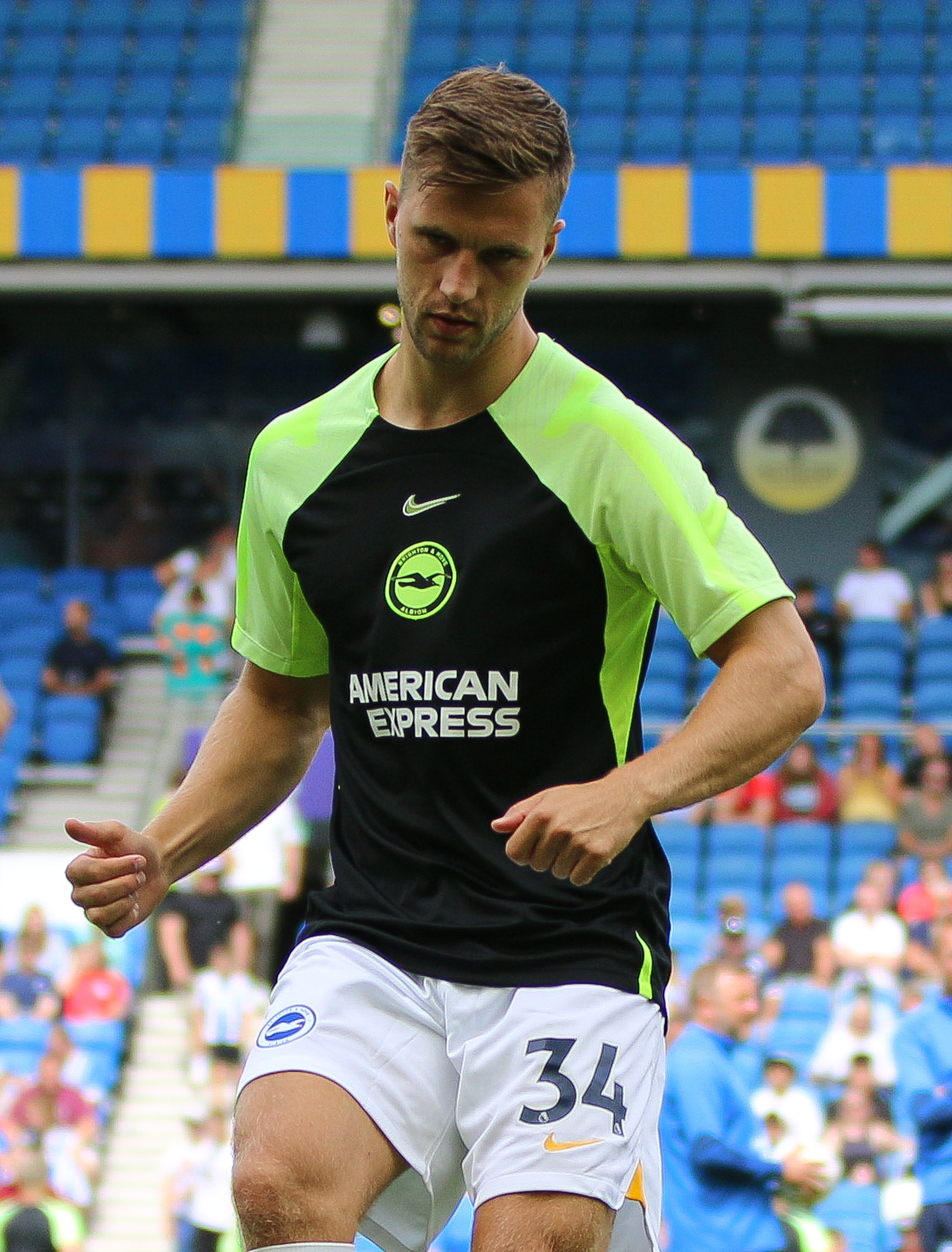
Joël Veltman with Brighton & Hove Albion's pre-match in 2022.

On 4 March 2023, after coming on replacing the injured Tariq Lamptey, with Alexis Mac Allister flicking on from a Pascal Groß corner Veltman chested home into the bottom corner to make it 2–0 in the eventual 4–0 home win over West Ham.

==== 2023–24 season ====
On 3 July 2023, Veltman signed a new contract with Brighton extending his contract until June 2025. He scored his first and only goal of the season on 11 May 2024, opening the scoring in an eventual 1–1 draw against Newcastle United.

=== West Ham United ===
On 6 August 2026, Veltman signed a one-year contract, with an option for another year, with EFL Championship side West Ham United.

== International career ==
=== Youth ===
Veltman made Netherlands debut playing for the under-17 squad on 10 February 2009 in the 2009 edition of the La Manga Cup in the 0–4 loss against Czech Republic U17s. He also played in the 2009 UEFA European Under-17 Championship group stage match against England U17s which ended in a 1–1 draw, having previously appeared in three of the qualification matches. On 2 September 2010, Veltman made his debut for Netherlands U19s in a friendly against Germany which ended in a 2–2 draw. On 9 February 2011, Veltman scored his first international goal in another friendly for the U19s against France, with the match ending in a 1–1 draw. On 23 May 2012, Veltman made his debut for the U21 side at the 2012 Toulon Tournament in France. He appeared in four matches for the Dutch, making his debut against Egypt in the 3–0 win.

=== Senior ===
On 8 November 2013, it was announced that Veltman received his first call-up for the Netherlands senior team by head coach Louis van Gaal for the friendly matches against Japan and Colombia. Remaining on the bench for the duration of the first match against Japan, Veltman made his debut for the first team on 19 November in the fixture against Colombia, playing the full 90 minutes in the 0–0 draw at the Amsterdam Arena. On 31 May 2014, Veltman was named as part of the 23-man squad heading to the finals of the 2014 FIFA World Cup under Van Gaal. He was joined by Ajax teammates Daley Blind and Jasper Cillessen.

Veltman was named in the Dutch 34-man preliminary squad for Euro 2020 on 14 May 2021, with the 26-man squad to be announced on 26 May. The tournament took place in 2021 due to the previous year's postponement as a result of Coronavirus. He was included in the final 26-man squad on 26 May. His only appearance of the tournament came in the Netherlands' opening group game against Ukraine at the Johan Cruyff Arena in Amsterdam on 13 June, where he came on in the 88th minute replacing Jurriën Timber in a 3–2 victory. The Dutch were knocked out in the Round of 16 after a 2–0 loss against Czech Republic on 27 June at the Puskás Aréna in Budapest.

== Career statistics ==
=== Club ===
As of match played 31 October 2026

Appearances and goals by club, season and competition
Club	Season	League			National cup (Note: Includes KNVB Cup, FA Cup)		League cup (Note: Includes EFL Cup)		Europe		Other		Total	
Club	Season	Division	Apps	Goals	Apps	Goals	Apps	Goals	Apps	Goals	Apps	Goals	Apps	Goals
Ajax	2011–12	Eredivisie	0	0	0	0	—		0	0	—		0	0
Ajax	2012–13	Eredivisie	7	0	3	0	—		0	0	0	0	10	0
Ajax	2013–14	Eredivisie	25	2	4	0	—		4 (Note: Three appearances in UEFA Champions League, one appearance in UEFA Europa League)	0	1 (Note: Appearance in Johan Cruyff Shield)	0	34	2
Ajax	2014–15	Eredivisie	25	4	1	0	—		8 (Note: Five appearances in UEFA Champions League, three appearances in UEFA Europa League)	0	0	0	34	4
Ajax	2015–16	Eredivisie	34	2	1	0	—		9 (Note: Two appearances in UEFA Champions League, seven appearances in UEFA Europa League)	0	—		44	2
Ajax	2016–17	Eredivisie	30	0	0	0	—		14 (Note: Four appearances in UEFA Champions League, ten appearances in UEFA Europa League)	0	—		44	0
Ajax	2017–18	Eredivisie	30	1	2	0	—		4 (Note: Two appearances in UEFA Champions League, two appearances in UEFA Europa League)	0	—		36	1
Ajax	2018–19	Eredivisie	9	1	0	0	—		5 (Note: Appearances in UEFA Champions League)	0	—		14	1
Ajax	2019–20	Eredivisie	19	0	1	0	—		9	0	1	0	30	0
Ajax	Total		179	10	12	0	—		53	0	2	0	246	10
Brighton & Hove Albion	2020–21	Premier League	28	1	3	0	3	0	—		—		34	1
Brighton & Hove Albion	2021–22	Premier League	34	1	2	0	1	0	—		—		37	1
Brighton & Hove Albion	2022–23	Premier League	31	1	3	0	1	0	—		—		35	1
Brighton & Hove Albion	2023–24	Premier League	27	1	0	0	0	0	6 (Note: Appearances in UEFA Europa League)	0	—		33	1
Brighton & Hove Albion	2024–25	Premier League	21	0	2	0	1	0	—		—		24	0
Brighton & Hove Albion	2025–26	Premier League	24	1	2	0	2	0	—		—		28	1
Brighton & Hove Albion	Total		165	5	12	0	8	0	6	0	—		191	5
West Ham United	2026–27	Championship	12	0	0	0	2	0	—		—		14	0
Career total			356	15	24	0	10	0	59	0	2	0	451	15

=== International ===
As of match played 13 June 2021

Appearances and goals by national team and year
National team	Year	Apps	Goals
Netherlands	2013	1	0
Netherlands	2014	6	0
Netherlands	2015	1	0
Netherlands	2016	6	0
Netherlands	2017	5	2
Netherlands	2018	0	0
Netherlands	2019	3	0
Netherlands	2020	5	0
Netherlands	2021	1	0
Total		28	2

Scores and results list Netherlands' goal tally first.

List of international goals scored by Joël Veltman
No.	Date	Venue	Opponent	Score	Result	Competition
1	4 June 2017	De Kuip, Rotterdam, Netherlands	Ivory Coast	1–0	5–0	Friendly
2	4 June 2017	De Kuip, Rotterdam, Netherlands	Ivory Coast	3–0	5–0	Friendly

== Honours ==
Ajax

- Eredivisie: 2012–13, 2013–14, 2018–19
- KNVB Cup: 2018–19
- Johan Cruyff Shield: 2013, 2019
- UEFA Europa League runner-up: 2016–17

Netherlands

- FIFA World Cup third place: 2014

Individual

- Eredivisie Team of the Year: 2013–14, 2014–15, 2015–16, 2016–17
