= Joshua Duffus =

English footballer (born 2005)

Personal information
- Full name: Joshua James Leslie Duffus
- Date of birth: 31 May 2005 (age 21)
- Place of birth: Lambeth, England
- Height: 1.81 m (5 ft 11 in)
- Position: Forward

Team information
- Current team: Saint-Étienne
- Number: 17

Youth career
- Lambeth Tigers FC
- 2017–2025: Brighton & Hove Albion

Senior career*
Years	Team	Apps	(Gls)
2023–2025	Brighton & Hove Albion	0	(0)
2025–	Saint-Étienne	27	(7)

International career^{‡}
2022	England U17	2	(0)
2023–2024	England U19	5	(0)
- * Club domestic league appearances and goals as of 11 May 2026 ‡ National team caps and goals as of 13:30, 1 October 2024 (UTC)

Joshua James Leslie Duffus (born 31 May 2005) is an English professional footballer who plays as a forward for French Ligue 2 club Saint-Étienne.

== Club career ==
A youth product of Lambeth Tigers FC, Duffus moved to the youth academy of Brighton & Hove Albion in 2017. On 8 July 2021, he signed as a first year scholar with the club. On 18 November 2022, he signed his first professional contract with Brighton & Hove Albion. In October 2023, he was called up to the senior squad for the first time for a UEFA Europa League match against AFC Ajax. He made his senior and professional debut with Brighton & Hove Albion as a substitute in a 1–0 UEFA Europa League win over AEK Athens on 30 November 2023.

On 13 August 2025, Duffus joined Ligue 2 side Saint-Étienne.

== International career ==
Duffus is a youth international for England. He was called up to the England U19s for a set of friendlies in November 2023.

== Career statistics ==
=== Club ===
As of match played 14 March 2026

Appearances and goals by club, season and competition
Club	Season	League			National cup (Note: Includes FA Cup and Coupe de France)		League cup (Note: Includes EFL Cup)		Continental		Other		Total	
Club	Season	Division	Apps	Goals	Apps	Goals	Apps	Goals	Apps	Goals	Apps	Goals	Apps	Goals
Brighton & Hove Albion U21	2023–24	—			—		—		—		3 (Note: Appearance(s) in EFL Trophy)	0	3	0
Brighton & Hove Albion U21	2024–25	—			—		—		—		3	1	3	1
Brighton & Hove Albion U21	Total		—		—		—		—		6	1	6	1
Brighton & Hove Albion	2023–24	Premier League	0	0	0	0	0	0	1 (Note: Appearance(s) in UEFA Europa League)	0	—		1	0
Saint-Étienne	2025–26	Ligue 2	20	5	0	0	—		—		—		20	5
Career total			20	5	0	0	0	0	1	0	6	1	27	6
