= 2023–24 Brighton & Hove Albion F.C. season =

122nd season in existence of Brighton & Hove Albion FC

Brighton & Hove Albion
2023–24 season
- Chairman: Tony Bloom
- Head coach: Roberto De Zerbi
- Stadium: Falmer Stadium
- Premier League: 11th
- FA Cup: Fifth round
- EFL Cup: Third round
- UEFA Europa League: Round of 16
- Top goalscorer: League: João Pedro (9); All: João Pedro (20)
- Highest home attendance: 31,752 vs Liverpool (Premier League – 8 October 2023)
- Lowest home attendance: 30,178 vs AEK Athens (UEFA Europa League– 21 September 2023)
- Average home league attendance: 31,531
- Biggest win: 5–0 vs Sheffield United (Premier League – 18 February 2024)
- Biggest defeat: 1–6 vs Aston Villa (Premier League – 30 September 2023)
Home colours	Away colours	Third colours

The 2023–24 season was the 122nd season in the history of Brighton & Hove Albion and their seventh consecutive season in the Premier League. The club also competed in the Premier League, the FA Cup, the EFL Cup and a debut appearance in UEFA Europa League, playing European football for the first time in the club's history.

== Summary ==
Brighton hosted Luton Town in the opening game of the season on 12 August, with this fixture being the Hatters Premier League debut. The Albion came out superior winning 4–1, with several players making their Brighton debuts including goalscorers João Pedro and Simon Adingra. The Albion followed their previous result with another 4–1 win this time away at Wolverhampton Wanderers in the second weekend of the season. However, they could not repeat this in their third, a 3–1 home loss against West Ham where Pascal Groß became Brighton's all time Premier League top scorer with his consolation strike in the match taking his tally to 27 top flight goals.

A week later on 2 September, Brighton beat Champions League participants Newcastle United 3–1 on Sussex soil with Evan Ferguson scoring his first career hat-trick. He became only the second non-English player with 10 Premier League goal involvements aged 18 or under, an achievement he shares with Cesc Fàbregas.

On Brighton's European debut on 21 September, Brighton fell to a 3–2 home defeat to Greek champions AEK Athens, with both of Brighton's goals coming from João Pedro's spot kicks. At the Stade Vélodrome in Marseille on 5 October, in their first ever away game in Europe, Brighton came from two down to draw 2–2 with Pascal Groß scoring his first European goal. Pedro scored the equaliser, hitting home his third penalty in two Europa League matches. On 26 October, Brighton would win their first-ever match in Europe, after defeating six-time European champions, Ajax at home in a 2–0 victory.

After more positive results, Brighton would finish at the top of their group and were set to play Roma in the Round of 16. In the first of the two legs, the Albion would be thrashed 4–0 at Stadio Olimpico, but would defeat Roma in a 1–0 win at home at Falmer Stadium. Still, between the two games, Brighton would end up losing 4–1 on aggregate to I Giallorossi and were inevitably eliminated from the Europa League.

Being plagued with injuries throughout the season, and more so in the latter half, the squad saw many players from the academy make their debuts or take more important roles such as Benicio Baker-Boaitey and Odel Offiah. After competing in the 2024 CONMEBOL Pre-Olympic Tournament, new signing, Valentín Barco from Boca Juniors in Argentina, would also come to the South Coast and make his debut as a substitute against Wolverhampton in the FA Cup.

On 18 May, before Brighton's final match against Manchester United, the club announced that Head Coach Roberto De Zerbi would be leaving the club at the conclusion of the season. De Zerbi's final match with Brighton would come to be a 2–0 defeat to the Red Devils, resulting in the Seagulls finishing in eleventh place after the final day of the 2023-24 Premier League season.

== Players ==
As of 28 February 2024

No.	Player	Position	Nationality	Place of birth	Date of birth (age)	Signed from	Date signed	Fee	Contract end
Goalkeepers
1	Bart Verbruggen	GK	(Netherlands)	Breda	18 August 2002 (age 24)	(Belgium) Anderlecht	3 July 2023	£16,300,000	30 June 2028
23	Jason Steele	GK	(England)	Newton Aycliffe	18 August 1990 (age 36)	Sunderland	1 July 2018	Free transfer	30 June 2026
38	Tom McGill	GK	(Canada)	Belleville	25 March 2000 (age 26)	Academy	1 July 2018	—N/a	30 June 2025
Defenders
2	Tariq Lamptey	RB	(Ghana)	Hillingdon	30 September 2000 (age 26)	Chelsea	31 January 2020	£1,200,000	30 June 2025
3	Igor Julio	CB	(Brazil)	Bom Sucesso	7 February 1998 (age 28)	(Italy) Fiorentina	26 July 2023	£15,000,000	30 June 2027
4	Adam Webster	CB	(England)	Chichester	4 January 1995 (age 31)	Bristol City	3 August 2019	£22,220,000	30 June 2026
5	Lewis Dunk	CB	(England)	Brighton	21 November 1991 (age 34)	Academy	1 July 2010	—N/a	30 June 2026
19	Valentín Barco	LB	(Argentina)	Veinticinco de Mayo	23 July 2004 (age 22)	(Argentina) Boca Juniors	20 January 2024	£8,000,000	30 June 2028
29	Jan Paul van Hecke	CB	(Netherlands)	Arnemuiden	8 June 2000 (age 26)	(Netherlands) NAC Breda	10 September 2020	£1,500,000	30 June 2027
30	Pervis Estupiñán	LB	(Ecuador)	Esmeraldas	21 January 1998 (age 28)	(Spain) Villarreal	16 August 2022	£17,800,000	30 June 2027
34	Joël Veltman	RB	(Netherlands)	IJmuiden	15 January 1992 (age 34)	(Netherlands) Ajax	29 July 2020	£900,000	30 June 2025
42	Odeluga Offiah	CB	(England)	Camden	26 October 2002 (age 24)	(England) Bromley	13 September 2017	Undisclosed	30 June 2025
50	Ben Jackson	CB	(England)	—N/a	3 September 2003 (age 23)	(England) Watford	1 July 2020	—N/a	30 June 2024
52	Leigh Kavanagh	CB	(Republic of Ireland)	—N/a	27 December 2003 (age 22)	(Republic of Ireland) Bray Wanderers	1 July 2020	—N/a	30 June 2024
Midfielders
6	James Milner	CM	(England)	Leeds	4 January 1986 (age 40)	Liverpool	1 July 2023	Free transfer	30 June 2025
7	Solly March	RW	(England)	Eastbourne	20 July 1994 (age 32)	Lewes	1 November 2011	£5,000	30 June 2026
11	Billy Gilmour	CM	(Scotland)	Irvine	11 June 2001 (age 25)	Chelsea	1 September 2022	£8,330,000	30 June 2026
13	Pascal Groß	CM	(Germany)	Mannheim	15 June 1991 (age 35)	(Germany) Ingolstadt 04	1 July 2017	£3,000,000	30 June 2025
14	Adam Lallana	AM	(England)	St Albans	10 May 1988 (age 38)	Liverpool	27 July 2020	Free transfer	30 June 2024
15	Jakub Moder	CM	(Poland)	Szczecinek	7 April 1999 (age 27)	(Poland) Lech Poznań	4 October 2020	£11,000,000	30 June 2025
20	Carlos Baleba	CM	(Cameroon)	Douala	3 January 2004 (age 22)	(France) Lille	29 August 2023	£23,200,000	30 June 2028
22	Kaoru Mitoma	LW	(Japan)	Hita	20 May 1997 (age 29)	(Japan) Kawasaki Frontale	10 August 2021	£3,000,000	30 June 2027
24	Simon Adingra	LW	(Ivory Coast)	Yamoussoukro	1 January 2002 (age 24)	(Denmark) Nordsjælland	1 July 2022	£8,000,000	30 June 2026
31	Ansu Fati	LW	(Spain)	Bissau	31 October 2002 (age 24)	(Spain) Barcelona	1 September 2023	Loan	31 May 2024
40	Facundo Buonanotte	AM	(Argentina)	Pérez	23 December 2004 (age 21)	(Argentina) Rosario Central	1 January 2023	£6,000,000	30 June 2026
41	Jack Hinshelwood	CM	(England)	Worthing	11 April 2005 (age 21)	(England) Academy	1 July 2012	—N/a	30 June 2028
44	Cameron Peupion	AM	(Australia)	Sydney	23 September 2002 (age 24)	(Australia) Sydney	18 August 2020	£165,000	30 June 2024
47	Benicio Baker-Boaitey	LW	(England)	—N/a	10 January 2004 (age 22)	(Portugal) FC Porto	20 June 2022	Free transfer	—N/a
48	Samy Chouchane	CM	(Tunisia)	Paris	5 September 2003 (age 23)	(France) AC Boulogne-Billancourt	1 July 2020	—N/a	30 June 2025
Forwards
9	João Pedro	CF	(Brazil)	Ribeirão Preto	26 September 2001 (age 25)	Watford	1 July 2023	£34,200,000	30 June 2028
10	Julio Enciso	CF	(Paraguay)	Caaguazú	23 January 2004 (age 22)	(Paraguay) Libertad	1 July 2022	£11,600,000	30 June 2026
18	Danny Welbeck	CF	(England)	Manchester	26 November 1990 (age 35)	Watford	18 October 2020	Free transfer	30 June 2026
28	Evan Ferguson	CF	(Republic of Ireland)	Bettystown	19 October 2004 (age 22)	(Republic of Ireland) Bohemians	9 January 2021	Undisclosed	30 June 2029
55	Mark O'Mahony	CF	(Republic of Ireland)	Carrigaline	January 14, 2005 (age 21)	(Republic of Ireland) Cork City	26 January 2023	Undisclosed	30 June 2027
56	Joshua Duffus	CF	(England)	Lambeth	15 December 2004 (age 21)	(England) Academy	1 October 2017	—N/a	30 June 2024
Out on Loan
8	Mahmoud Dahoud	CM	(Germany)	Amuda	1 January 1996 (age 30)	(Germany) Borussia Dortmund	1 July 2023	Free transfer	30 June 2027
16	Kjell Scherpen	GK	(Netherlands)	Emmen	23 January 2000 (age 26)	(Netherlands) Ajax	16 July 2021	£5,000,000	30 June 2027
17	Steven Alzate	CM	(Colombia)	Camden	8 September 1998 (age 28)	Leyton Orient	31 July 2017	£110,000	30 June 2024
19	Jeremy Sarmiento	AM	(Ecuador)	Madrid	16 June 2002 (age 24)	(Portugal) Benfica	2 July 2021	Undisclosed	30 June 2027
21	Deniz Undav	CF	(Germany)	Achim	19 July 1996 (age 30)	(Belgium) Union Saint-Gilloise	30 January 2022	£7,000,000	30 June 2026
26	Yasin Ayari	CM	(Sweden)	Solna	6 October 2003 (age 23)	(Sweden) AIK	30 January 2023	£4,000,000	30 June 2027
45	Jack Hinchy	CM	(England)	—N/a	30 January 2003 (age 23)	(England) Stockport County	14 August 2021	—N/a	—N/a
	Kacper Kozłowski	CM	(Poland)	Koszalin	16 October 2003 (age 23)	(Poland) Pogoń Szczecin	5 January 2022	£11,000,000	30 June 2026
	Abdallah Sima	RW	(Senegal)	Dakar	17 June 2001 (age 25)	(Czech Republic) Slavia Prague	31 August 2021	£8,000,000	30 June 2025

== Transfers ==
=== In ===
Date	Pos.	Player	Transferred from	Fee	Team	Ref.
14 June 2023	CF	(Brazil) João Pedro	(England) Watford	Undisclosed	First team	
1 July 2023	CM	(Germany) Mahmoud Dahoud	(Germany) Borussia Dortmund	Free transfer	First team	
1 July 2023	CM	(England) James Milner	(England) Liverpool	Free transfer	First team	
3 July 2023	GK	(Netherlands) Bart Verbruggen	(Belgium) Anderlecht	£16,300,000	First team	
5 July 2023	FW	(Wales) Joe Belmont	(England) Liverpool U18s	Undisclosed	Under-18s	
21 July 2023	FW	(England) Brody Peart	(England) Basingstoke Town	Undisclosed	Under-21s	
26 July 2023	CB	(Brazil) Igor Julio	(Italy) Fiorentina	Undisclosed	First Team	
29 July 2023	LB	(England) Jacob Slater	(England) Preston North End	Undisclosed	Under-21s	
11 August 2023	CB	(Germany) Noël Atom	(Germany) RB Leipzig	Undisclosed	Under-21s	
29 August 2023	CM	(Cameroon) Carlos Baleba	(France) Lille	Undisclosed	First Team	
1 September 2023	FW	(England) Louis Flower	(England) Chelsea	Undisclosed	Under-21s	
20 January 2024	LB	(Argentina) Valentín Barco	(Argentina) Boca Juniors	£7,870,000	First Team	
26 January 2024	GK	(Australia) Steven Hall	(Australia) Adelaide United	Undisclosed	Under-21s	
26 January 2024	MF	(England) Kamari Doyle	(England) Southampton	Undisclosed	Under-21s	
1 February 2024	AM	(England) Josh Robertson	(England) Sunderland	Undisclosed	Under-21s	
1 February 2024	AM	(England) Caylan Vickers	(England) Reading	Undisclosed	Under-21s	

=== Out ===
Date	Pos.	Player	Transferred to	Fee	Team	Ref.
14 June 2023	CM	(Argentina) Alexis Mac Allister	(England) Liverpool	£55,000,000	First team	
14 June 2023	CM	(England) Taylor Richards	(England) Queens Park Rangers	Undisclosed	Under-21s	
30 June 2023	GK	(England) Toby Bull	(England) Eastbourne Town	Free transfer	Under-21s	
30 June 2023	MF	(England) Billie Clark	(England) Reading	Free transfer	Under-21s	
30 June 2023	MF	(England) Matt Everitt	(England) Dorking Wanderers	Free transfer	Under-21s	
30 June 2023	MF	(England) Jake Gee		Released	Under-18s	
30 June 2023	MF	(England) Eliot Jenks	(England) Lancing	Released	Under-18s	
30 June 2023	MF	(England) Teddy Jenks	(England) Forest Green Rovers	Free transfer	Under-21s	
30 June 2023	RW	(England) Todd Miller	(England) Bromley	Free transfer	Under-21s	
30 June 2023	DF	(England) Sam Packham		Released	Under-21s	
30 June 2023	LB	(England) Haydon Roberts	(England) Bristol City	Free transfer	Under-21s	
30 June 2023	DF	(Slovakia) Casey Shann	(England) Queens Park Rangers	Released	Under-21s	
30 June 2023	MF	(England) Jack Spong	(Scotland) Queens Park	Free transfer	Under-21s	
30 June 2023	GK	(England) Fynn Talley	(England) Peterborough United	Free transfer	Under-21s	
30 June 2023	FW	(Switzerland) Lorent Tolaj	(England) Aldershot Town	Free transfer	Under-21s	
30 June 2023	CB	(Belgium) Antef Tsoungui	(Netherlands) Feyenoord	Free transfer	Under-21s	
30 June 2023	MF	(Northern Ireland) Ben Wilson	(Northern Ireland) Cliftonville	Free transfer	Under-21s	
30 June 2023	DF	(England) Joe Winstanley		Released	Under-18s	
21 July 2023	MF	(Germany) Reda Khadra	(France) Reims	Undisclosed	Under-21s	
2 August 2023	FW	(Republic of Ireland) Aaron Connolly	(England) Hull City	Undisclosed	First Team	
5 August 2023	GK	(Spain) Robert Sánchez	(England) Chelsea	£25,000,000+	First Team	
8 August 2023	LB	(Poland) Michał Karbownik	(Germany) Hertha BSC	Undisclosed	First Team	
14 August 2023	DM	(Ecuador) Moisés Caicedo	(England) Chelsea	£100,000,000+	First Team	
1 September 2023	LB	(Republic of Ireland) James Furlong	(England) Hull City	Undisclosed	Under-21s	
5 September 2023	CF	(Switzerland) Andi Zeqiri	(Belgium) Genk	Undisclosed	First Team	

=== Loaned in ===
Date	Pos.	Player	Loaned from	Until	Team	Ref.
1 September 2023	LW	(Spain) Ansu Fati	(Spain) Barcelona	End of season	First Team	

=== Loaned out ===
Date	Pos.	Player	Loaned to	Until	Team	Ref.
1 July 2023	GK	(England) James Beadle	(England) Oxford United	8 January 2024 (Note: On 8 January, Beadle was recalled from his season-long loan at Oxford and subsequently was loaned to Sheffield Wednesday.)	Under-21s	
1 July 2023	RW	(Senegal) Abdallah Sima	(Scotland) Rangers	End of season	Under-21s	
6 July 2023	GK	(Netherlands) Kjell Scherpen	(Austria) Sturm Graz	End of season	First Team	
18 July 2023	CM	(Poland) Kacper Kozłowski	(Netherlands) Vitesse	End of season	First team	
25 July 2023	AM	(Ecuador) Jeremy Sarmiento	(England) West Bromwich Albion	1 January 2024 (Note: On 1 January, Sarmiento was recalled from his season-long loan at West Brom and subsequently was loaned to Ipswich.)	First team	
29 July 2023	CM	(Scotland) Marc Leonard	(England) Northampton Town	End of season	Under-21s	
31 July 2023	GK	(England) Carl Rushworth	(Wales) Swansea City	End of season	Under-21s	
1 August 2023	CB	(Wales) Ed Turns	(England) Leyton Orient	1 February 2024 (Note: On 1 February, Turns was recalled from his season-long loan at Leyton Orient and subsequently joined Crewe on loan.)	Under-21s	
2 August 2023	CF	(Germany) Deniz Undav	(Germany) Stuttgart	End of season	First team	
11 August 2023	CM	(England) Jensen Weir	(England) Blackpool	1 January 2024 (Note: On 1 January, Weir was recalled from his season-long loan at Blackpool and subsequently was loaned to Port Vale.)	Under-21s	
18 August 2023	CB	(England) Odeluga Offiah	(Scotland) Heart of Midlothian	End of season	Under-21s	
21 August 2023	CM	(Sweden) Yasin Ayari	(England) Coventry City	5 January 2024 (Note: On 5 January, Ayari was recalled from his season-long loan at Coventry, and subsequently joined Blackburn on loan.)	First team	
26 August 2023	AM	(Republic of Ireland) Andrew Moran	(England) Blackburn Rovers	End of season	Under-21s	
29 August 2023	AM	(Australia) Cameron Peupion	(England) Cheltenham Town	2 January 2024 (Note: On 2 January, Peupion was recalled from his season-long loan at Cheltenham.)	Under-21s	
1 September 2023	FW	(England) Bailey Smith	(England) Worthing	January 2024	Under-18s	
6 September 2023	CM	(Colombia) Steven Alzate	(Belgium) Standard Liège	End of season	First team	
3 January 2024	AM	(Ecuador) Jeremy Sarmiento	(England) Ipswich Town	End of season	First team	
5 January 2024	CM	(Sweden) Yasin Ayari	(England) Blackburn Rovers	End of season	First team	
8 January 2024	GK	(England) James Beadle	(England) Sheffield Wednesday	End of season	Under-21s	
9 January 2024	CM	(England) Jensen Weir	(England) Port Vale	End of season	Under-21s	
22 January 2024	RW	(Romania) Adrian Mazilu	(Netherlands) Vitesse	End of season	Under-21s	
1 February 2024	CM	(Germany) Mahmoud Dahoud	(Germany) Stuttgart	End of season	First team	
1 February 2024	CM	(England) Jack Hinchy	(England) Shrewsbury Town	End of season	Under-21s	
1 February 2024	LB	(England) Imari Samuels	(England) Fleetwood Town	End of season	Under-21s	
1 February 2024	CB	(Wales) Ed Turns	(England) Crewe Alexandra	End of season	Under-21s	

== Pre-season and friendlies ==
Win Draw Loss Fixtures

The Seagulls announced a tour of the United States to take part in the Premier League Summer Series pre-season tournament with matches against Chelsea, Brentford and Newcastle United. On 30 June, a further friendly at home against Rayo Vallecano in August was confirmed.

22 July 2023 Premier League Summer Series	Chelsea	4–3	Brighton & Hove Albion	Philadelphia, United States
19:00 EDT	Nkunku 19', (yellow card) 52'; Mudryk 65'; Gallagher 72'; Jackson 76'	Report	Welbeck 13'; March (yellow card) 37'; Van Hecke (yellow card) 57' (yellow-red card) 60'; João Pedro 79' (pen.); Undav 89'	Stadium: Lincoln Financial Field; Attendance: 65,128; Referee: Robert Jones

26 July 2023 Premier League Summer Series	Brentford	0–2	Brighton & Hove Albion	Atlanta, United States
17:30 EDT	Onyeka (yellow card) 31'; Jørgensen (yellow card) 41'	Report	Adingra 19', 58'	Stadium: Mercedes-Benz Stadium; Attendance: 40,000; Referee: Guido Gonzales, Jr. (United States)

28 July 2023 Premier League Summer Series	Brighton & Hove Albion	1–2	Newcastle United	Harrison, United States
19:30 EDT	Welbeck 49'; Van Hecke (yellow card) 64'	Report	Bruno Guimarães (yellow card) 30'; Pope (yellow card) 74'; Anderson 86', 90+2'	Stadium: Red Bull Arena; Attendance: 26,150; Referee: Sergii Demianchuk (United States)

6 August 2023 Friendly	Brighton & Hove Albion	1–1	Rayo Vallecano	Falmer
15:00 BST	João Pedro 66' (pen.)	Report	García 14'	Stadium: Falmer Stadium; Attendance: 10,563; Referee: Peter Bankes

== Competitions ==
=== Overall record ===
Competition	First match	Last match	Starting round	Final position	Record							
Competition	First match	Last match	Starting round	Final position	Pld	W	D	L	GF	GA	GD	Win %
Premier League	12 August 2023	19 May 2024	Matchday 1	11th	38	12	12	14	55	62	−7	31.58
FA Cup	6 January 2024	28 February 2024	Third round	Fifth round	3	2	0	1	9	5	+4	66.67
EFL Cup	27 September 2023		Third round	Third round	1	0	0	1	0	1	−1	0.00
UEFA Europa League	21 September 2023	14 March 2024	Group stage	Round of 16	8	5	1	2	11	9	+2	62.50
Total					50	19	13	18	75	77	−2	38.00

Source: Soccerway

=== Premier League ===
==== League table ====
Pos	Team	Pld	W	D	L	GF	GA	GD	Pts
9	West Ham United	38	14	10	14	60	74	−14	52
10	Crystal Palace	38	13	10	15	57	58	−1	49
11	Brighton & Hove Albion	38	12	12	14	55	62	−7	48
12	Bournemouth	38	13	9	16	54	67	−13	48
13	Fulham	38	13	8	17	55	61	−6	47

Source: Premier League
Rules for classification: 1) Points; 2) Goal difference; 3) Goals scored; 4) If the champions, relegated teams or qualified teams for UEFA competitions cannot be determined by rules 1 to 3, rules 4.1 to 4.3 are applied – 4.1) Points gained in head-to-head record between such teams; 4.2) Away goals scored in head-to-head record between such teams; 4.3) Play-offs

==== Results summary ====
Overall								Home						Away					
Pld	W	D	L	GF	GA	GD	Pts	W	D	L	GF	GA	GD	W	D	L	GF	GA	GD
38	12	12	14	55	62	−7	48	8	6	5	30	27	+3	4	6	9	25	35	−10

Source: Soccerway

==== Results by round ====
Round	1	2	3	4	5	6	7	8	9	10	11	12	13	14	15	16	17	18	19	20	21	22	23	24	25	26	27	28	30	31	32	33	29 (Note: Game on matchweek 29 was postponed due to Manchester City's FA Cup progression. Game rescheduled for 25 April 2024.)	35	36	37	34 (Note: Game on matchweek 34 was postponed due to Chelsea's FA Cup progression. Game rescheduled for 15 May 2024.)	38
Ground	H	A	H	H	A	H	A	H	A	H	A	H	A	A	H	H	A	A	H	A	H	A	H	A	A	H	A	H	A	A	H	A	H	A	H	A	H	H
Result	W	W	L	W	W	W	L	D	L	D	D	D	W	L	W	D	L	D	W	D	D	L	W	L	W	D	L	W	L	D	L	D	L	L	W	D	L	L
Position	2	1	6	6	5	3	6	6	7	7	7	8	8	8	8	8	9	9	8	7	7	9	8	9	7	7	9	8	9	9	10	10	11	12	11	10	10	11
Points	3	6	6	9	12	15	15	16	16	17	18	19	22	22	25	26	26	27	30	31	32	32	35	35	38	39	39	42	42	43	43	44	44	44	47	48	48	48

Source: Soccerway
A = Away; H = Home; W = Win; D = Draw; L = Loss; P = Postponed

==== Matches ====
On 15 June, the Premier League fixtures were announced.

Win Draw Loss Fixtures

12 August 2023 1	Brighton & Hove Albion	4–1	Luton Town	Falmer
15:00 BST	Estupiñán (yellow card) 7'; March 36'; Mitoma (yellow card) 43'; João Pedro 71' (pen.); Adingra 85'; Ferguson 90+5'	Report	Andersen (yellow card) 51'; Kaboré (yellow card) 59'; Morris 81' (pen.)	Stadium: Falmer Stadium; Attendance: 31,672; Referee: David Coote

19 August 2023 2	Wolverhampton Wanderers	1–4	Brighton & Hove Albion	Wolverhampton
15:00 BST	Dawson (yellow card) 17'; Hwang Hee-chan 61', (yellow card) 63'; Nunes (yellow card) 76' (yellow-red card) 90+5'; Kilman (yellow card) 88'	Report	Groß (yellow card) 8'; Mitoma 15'; Milner (yellow card) 18'; Enciso (yellow card) 19'; Estupiñán 46', (yellow card) 60'; March 51', 55'; João Pedro (yellow card) 64'	Stadium: Molineux Stadium; Attendance: 31,317; Referee: Andrew Madley

26 August 2023 3	Brighton & Hove Albion	1–3	West Ham United	Falmer
17:30 BST	Groß 81'; Mitoma (yellow card) 88'	Report	Ward-Prowse 19', (yellow card) 24'; Álvarez (yellow card) 45+1'; Bowen 58'; Antonio 63'; Kehrer (yellow card) 89'	Stadium: Falmer Stadium; Attendance: 31,508; Referee: Anthony Taylor

2 September 2023 4	Brighton & Hove Albion	3–1	Newcastle United	Falmer
17:30 BST	Ferguson 27', 65', 70'; Lamptey (yellow card) 83'; Milner (yellow card) 86'; Dahoud (yellow card) 90+5'; Lallana (yellow card) 90+8'	Report	Gordon (yellow card) 23'; Schär (yellow card) 43'; Targett (yellow card) 68'; Burn (yellow card) 76'; Wilson 90+2'	Stadium: Falmer Stadium; Attendance: 31,620; Referee: Stuart Attwell

16 September 2023 5	Manchester United	1–3	Brighton & Hove Albion	Trafford
15:00 BST	Fernandes (yellow card) 45+3'; Mejbri 73', (yellow card) 90+2'	Report	Lamptey (yellow card) 4'; Welbeck 20'; Van Hecke (yellow card) 24'; Groß 53'; João Pedro 71'	Stadium: Old Trafford; Attendance: 73,592; Referee: Jarred Gillett

24 September 2023 6	Brighton & Hove Albion	3–1	Bournemouth	Falmer
14:00 BST	Veltman (yellow card) 37'; Kerkez 45+2' (o.g.); Gilmour (yellow card) 45+3'; Mitoma 46', 77'; Dunk (yellow card) 75'	Report	Solanke 25'; Zabarnyi (yellow card) 41'; Brooks (yellow card) 89'; Senesi (yellow card) 90+6'	Stadium: Falmer Stadium; Attendance: 31,617; Referee: John Brooks

30 September 2023 7	Aston Villa	6–1	Brighton & Hove Albion	Aston, Birmingham
12:30 BST	Douglas Luiz (yellow card) 7', (goal) 90+7'; Watkins 14', 21', 65'; Estupiñán 26' (o.g.); Digne (yellow card) 32'; Konsa (yellow card) 57'; Ramsey 85'; Durán (yellow card) 90+5'	Report	Welbeck (yellow card) 39'; Fati 50', (yellow card) 72'; Dunk (yellow card) 78'; Mitoma (yellow card) 84'	Stadium: Villa Park; Attendance: 40,636; Referee: Andrew Madley

8 October 2023 8	Brighton & Hove Albion	2–2	Liverpool	Falmer
14:00 BST	Adingra 20'; Dunk 78'; Baleba (yellow card) 90+4'	Report	Salah 40', 45+1' (pen.); Szoboszlai (yellow card) 67'; Gomez (yellow card) 86'	Stadium: Falmer Stadium; Attendance: 31,752; Referee: Anthony Taylor

21 October 2023 9	Manchester City	2–1	Brighton & Hove Albion	Manchester
15:00 BST	Álvarez 7'; Haaland 19'; Rodri (yellow card) 38'; Akanji (yellow card) 63' (yellow-red card) 90+5'; Grealish (yellow card) 84'	Report	March (yellow card) 36'; Igor (yellow card) 64'; Fati 73'	Stadium: City of Manchester Stadium; Attendance: 53,466; Referee: Robert Jones

29 October 2023 10	Brighton & Hove Albion	1–1	Fulham	Falmer
14:00 GMT	Ferguson 26'	Report	Palhinha 65'; Robinson (yellow card) 73'; Muniz (yellow card) 78'; Wilson (yellow card) 90'	Stadium: Falmer Stadium; Attendance: 31,550; Referee: Michael Salisbury

4 November 2023 11	Everton	1–1	Brighton & Hove Albion	Walton, Liverpool
15:00 GMT	Mykolenko 7'; Gueye (yellow card) 43'; Doucouré (yellow card) 54'; Branthwaite (yellow card) 77'; Tarkowski (yellow card) 81'	Report	Gilmour (yellow card) 20'; Dunk (yellow card) 23'; Young 84' (o.g.)	Stadium: Goodison Park; Attendance: 38,683; Referee: Tim Robinson

12 November 2023 12	Brighton & Hove Albion	1–1	Sheffield United	Falmer
14:00 GMT	Adingra 6', (yellow card) 66'; Buonanotte (yellow card) 45+3'; Dahoud (red card) 69'; Baleba (yellow card) 77'	Report	Bogle (yellow card) 45+2'; Webster 74' (o.g.); Robinson (yellow card) 88'	Stadium: Falmer Stadium; Attendance: 31,367; Referee: John Brooks

25 November 2023 13	Nottingham Forest	2–3	Brighton & Hove Albion	West Bridgford
15:00 GMT	Elanga 3'; Toffolo (yellow card) 54'; Niakhaté (yellow card) 74'; Gibbs-White 76' (pen.)	Report	Ferguson 26', (yellow card) 74'; João Pedro 45+4', 58' (pen.); Adingra (yellow card) 65'; Dunk (yellow card) 72', (red card) 73'; Verbruggen (yellow card) 82'; Buonanotte (yellow card) 90+4'	Stadium: City Ground; Attendance: 29,404; Referee: Anthony Taylor

3 December 2023 14	Chelsea	3–2	Brighton & Hove Albion	Fulham
14:00 GMT	Fernández 17', 65' (pen.), (yellow card) 59'; Colwill 21'; Gallagher (yellow card) 31' (yellow-red card) 45'; Badiashile (yellow card) 52'; Sánchez (yellow card) 88'	Report	Buonanotte 43'; Hinshelwood (yellow card) 45+6'; Igor (yellow card) 58'; Groß (yellow card) 64'; Milner (yellow card) 64'; João Pedro 90+2', (yellow card) 90+14'	Stadium: Stamford Bridge; Attendance: 39,647; Referee: Craig Pawson

6 December 2023 15	Brighton & Hove Albion	2–1	Brentford	Falmer
19:30 GMT	Van Hecke (yellow card) 25'; Groß 31'; Buonanotte (yellow card) 45+7'; Hinshelwood 52'; Gilmour (yellow card) 77'	Report	Mbeumo 27' (pen.); Wissa (yellow card) 76'	Stadium: Falmer Stadium; Attendance: 30,760; Referee: Peter Bankes

9 December 2023 16	Brighton & Hove Albion	1–1	Burnley	Falmer
15:00 GMT	Adingra 77'	Report	O'Shea (yellow card) 14'; Odobert 45', (yellow card) 72'; Taylor (yellow card) 66'; Redmond (yellow card) 86'	Stadium: Falmer Stadium; Attendance: 31,511; Referee: Simon Hooper

17 December 2023 17	Arsenal	2–0	Brighton & Hove Albion	Holloway, London
14:00 GMT	White (yellow card) 38'; Gabriel Jesus 53'; Havertz 87'	Report	Mitoma (yellow card) 43'; Gilmour (yellow card) 76'; Groß (yellow card) 89'	Stadium: Emirates Stadium; Attendance: 60,257; Referee: Tim Robinson

21 December 2023 18	Crystal Palace	1–1	Brighton & Hove Albion	Selhurst
20:00 GMT	Mateta (yellow card) 29'; Ayew 45+1'; Hughes (yellow card) 50'; Mitchell (yellow card) 54'; Ozoh (yellow card) 85'; Henderson (yellow card) 90'	Report	Baleba (yellow card) 31'; Igor (yellow card) 57'; Welbeck 82'	Stadium: Selhurst Park; Attendance: 24,171; Referee: John Brooks

28 December 2023 19	Brighton & Hove Albion	4–2	Tottenham Hotspur	Falmer
19:30 GMT	Hinshelwood 11'; João Pedro 23' (pen.), 75' (pen.); Buonanotte (yellow card) 43'; Estupiñán 63'; Moder (yellow card) 70'; Dunk (yellow card) 82'	Report	Kulusevski (yellow card) 23'; Richarlison (yellow card) 57'; Véliz 81'; Davies 85'	Stadium: Falmer Stadium; Attendance: 31,675; Referee: Jarred Gillett

2 January 2024 20	West Ham United	0–0	Brighton & Hove Albion	Stratford
19:30 GMT	Johnson (yellow card) 31'	Report		Stadium: London Stadium; Attendance: 62,462; Referee: Sam Barrott

22 January 2024 21	Brighton & Hove Albion	0–0	Wolverhampton Wanderers	Falmer
19:45 GMT	Webster (yellow card) 82'	Report	Cunha (yellow card) 45+2'; Dawson (yellow card) 54'; Kilman (yellow card) 73'; Toti (yellow card) 90+2'	Stadium: Falmer Stadium; Attendance: 31,505; Referee: Craig Pawson

30 January 2024 22	Luton Town	4–0	Brighton & Hove Albion	Luton
19:45 GMT	Adebayo 1', 42', 56'; Ogbene 3'; Sambi Lokonga (yellow card) 25'; Clark (yellow card) 64'	Report	Igor (yellow card) 13'; Baleba (yellow card) 73'	Stadium: Kenilworth Road; Attendance: 10,994; Referee: Robert Jones

3 February 2024 23	Brighton & Hove Albion	4–1	Crystal Palace	Falmer
15:00	Dunk 3'; Hinshelwood 33'; Buonanotte 34'; João Pedro 84'; Welbeck (yellow card) 90+2'	Report	Guéhi (yellow card) 16'; Matheus França (yellow card) 59'; Muñoz (yellow card) 62'; Mateta 71'	Stadium: Falmer Stadium; Attendance: 31,345; Referee: Simon Hooper

10 February 2024 24	Tottenham Hotspur	2–1	Brighton & Hove Albion	Tottenham, London
15:00	Maddison (yellow card) 35'; Sarr 61', (yellow card) 61'; Johnson 90+6'	Report	Groß 17' (pen.); Buonanotte (yellow card) 65'; Estupiñán (yellow card) 79'; Dunk (yellow card) 88'	Stadium: Tottenham Hotspur Stadium; Attendance: 61,445; Referee: Sam Barrott

18 February 2024 25	Sheffield United	0–5	Brighton & Hove Albion	Sheffield
14:00 GMT	Holgate (red card) 13'; Davies (yellow card) 90+3'	Report	Buonanotte 20', (yellow card) 56'; Welbeck 24'; Lamptey (yellow card) 45+6'; Robinson 75' (o.g.); Adingra 78', 85'; Gilmour (yellow card) 90'; Verbruggen (yellow card) 90+3'	Stadium: Bramall Lane; Attendance: 29,522; Referee: Stuart Attwell

24 February 2024 26	Brighton & Hove Albion	1–1	Everton	Falmer
15:00 GMT	Van Hecke (yellow card) 70'; Groß (yellow card) 74'; Gilmour (red card) 81'; Dunk 90+5'	Report	Tarkowski (yellow card) 33'; Branthwaite 73'; Beto (yellow card) 90+1'; Onana (yellow card) 90+2'	Stadium: Falmer Stadium; Attendance: 31,646; Referee: Tony Harrington

2 March 2024 27	Fulham	3–0	Brighton & Hove Albion	Fulham
15:00 GMT	Wilson 21'; Muniz 32'; Decordova-Reid (yellow card) 89'; Traoré 90+1'	Report	Baleba (yellow card) 8'; Estupiñán (yellow card) 57'	Stadium: Craven Cottage; Attendance: 24,460; Referee: Simon Hooper

10 March 2024 28	Brighton & Hove Albion	1–0	Nottingham Forest	Falmer
14:00 GMT	Omobamidele 29' (o.g.); Fati (yellow card) 41'; Moder (yellow card) 67'; Veltman (yellow card) 78'; Lallana (yellow card) 90+7'	Report	Domínguez (yellow card) 14'; Omobamidele (yellow card) 19'; Williams (yellow card) 55'; Sangaré (yellow card) 90+5'	Stadium: Falmer Stadium; Attendance: 31,505; Referee: Michael Salisbury

31 March 2024 30	Liverpool	2–1	Brighton & Hove Albion	Liverpool
14:00 GMT	Mac Allister (yellow card) 14'; Díaz 27'; Van Dijk (yellow card) 50'; Gomez (yellow card) 58'; Salah 65'; Endō (yellow card) 88'; Gakpo (yellow card) 90+4'	Report	Welbeck 2', (yellow card) 48'; Groß (yellow card) 20'; Van Hecke (yellow card) 71'	Stadium: Anfield; Attendance: 60,061; Referee: David Coote

3 April 2024 31	Brentford	0–0	Brighton & Hove Albion	Brentford
19:30 BST	Janelt (yellow card) 76'	Report	Buonanotte (yellow card) 53'	Stadium: Brentford Community Stadium; Attendance: 17,024; Referee: Andrew Madley

6 April 2024 32	Brighton & Hove Albion	0–3	Arsenal	Falmer
17:30 BST	Baleba (yellow card) 76'	Report	Saka 33' (pen.); Havertz 62'; Saliba (yellow card) 79'; Trossard 86'; White (yellow card) 90+5'	Stadium: Falmer Stadium; Attendance: 31,677; Referee: John Brooks

13 April 2024 33	Burnley	1–1	Brighton & Hove Albion	Burnley
15:00 BST	Cullen (yellow card) 28'; Brownhill 74'	Report	Muric 79' (o.g.); Veltman (yellow card) 90+1'; O'Mahony (yellow card) 90+7'	Stadium: Turf Moor; Attendance: 20,687; Referee: Simon Hooper

25 April 2024 29	Brighton & Hove Albion	0–4	Manchester City	Falmer
20:00 GMT	Veltman (yellow card) 35'; Baleba (yellow card) 76'	Report	De Bruyne 17'; Foden 26', 34'; Álvarez 62'	Stadium: Falmer Stadium; Attendance: 31,596; Referee: Jarred Gillett
Note: Fixture was originally scheduled for 16 March but was postponed due to Manchester City's FA Cup progression.

28 April 2024 35	Bournemouth	3–0	Brighton & Hove Albion	Bournemouth
14:00 BST	Senesi (yellow card) 8', (goal) 13'; Ünal 52'; Kluivert (yellow card) 57', (goal) 87'	Report	Gilmour (yellow card) 59'; Barco (yellow card) 66'	Stadium: Dean Court; Attendance: 11,188; Referee: Paul Tierney

5 May 2024 36	Brighton & Hove Albion	1–0	Aston Villa	Falmer
14:00 BST	Groß (yellow card) 49'; Adingra (yellow card) 63'; João Pedro (penalty missed) 87', 87'	Report	Cash (yellow card) 90+9'	Stadium: Falmer Stadium; Attendance: 31,596; Referee: Robert Jones

11 May 2024 37	Newcastle United	1–1	Brighton & Hove Albion	Newcastle upon Tyne
15:00 BST	Longstaff 45+5'; Hall (yellow card) 79'; Barnes (yellow card) 88'; Almirón (yellow card) 90+3'	Report	Veltman 18'; Gilmour (yellow card) 45+4'; Enciso (yellow card) 54'; Welbeck (yellow card) 77'; Baker-Boaitey (yellow card) 90+5'	Stadium: St James' Park; Attendance: 51,997; Referee: Darren England

15 May 2024 34	Brighton & Hove Albion	1–2	Chelsea	Falmer
19:45 BST	Dunk (yellow card) 29'; Verbruggen (yellow card) 81'; Welbeck 90+7'	Report	Palmer 34'; Nkunku 64'; Sterling (yellow card) 77'; Caicedo (yellow card) 79'; James (red card) 88'	Stadium: Falmer Stadium; Attendance: 31,555; Referee: Michael Salisbury
Note: Fixture was originally scheduled for 20 April but was postponed due to Chelsea's FA Cup progression.

19 May 2024 38	Brighton & Hove Albion	0–2	Manchester United	Falmer
16:00 BST	Gilmour (yellow card) 87'	Report	Amrabat (yellow card) 22'; Fernandes (yellow card) 45+1'; Dalot 73'; Højlund 88'; Casemiro (yellow card) 90+4'	Stadium: Falmer Stadium; Attendance: 31,662; Referee: Craig Pawson

=== FA Cup ===
As a Premier League side, Brighton entered in the third round, and were drawn away to EFL Championship club Stoke City. They were then drawn away to Sheffield United in the fourth round, and away to Wolverhampton Wanderers in the fifth round.

Win Draw Loss Fixtures

6 January 2024 Third round	Stoke City	2–4	Brighton & Hove Albion	Stoke-on-Trent
15:00 GMT	Hoever (yellow card) 13'; Van Hecke 16' (o.g.); Rose (yellow card) 37'; Bae Jun-ho (yellow card) 48'; Baker 63' (pen.)	Report	Van Hecke (yellow card) 8'; Buonanotte (yellow card) 37'; Estupiñán 45+6'; Dunk 52'; João Pedro 71', 80'	Stadium: bet365 Stadium; Attendance: 17,032; Referee: Paul Tierney

27 January 2024 Fourth round	Sheffield United	2–5	Brighton & Hove Albion	Sheffield
15:00 GMT	Norwood (yellow card) 10'; Hamer 44', (yellow card) 45+7'; Osula 45+8'	Report	Buonanotte 14'; João Pedro 29' (pen.), 52' (pen.), 67'; Webster (yellow card) 55'; Welbeck 90+7'	Stadium: Bramall Lane; Attendance: 18,391; Referee: Sunny Singh Gill

28 February 2024 Fifth round	Wolverhampton Wanderers	1–0	Brighton & Hove Albion	Wolverhampton
19:45 GMT	Lemina 2'; Sarabia (yellow card) 73'; Sá (yellow card) 82'; Neto (yellow card) 89'	Report	Fati (yellow card) 17'; Igor (yellow card) 63'	Stadium: Molineux Stadium; Attendance: 23,822; Referee: Andrew Madley

=== EFL Cup ===
Brighton entered the EFL Cup in the third round due to competing in UEFA competition, and were drawn away to Chelsea.

Win Draw Loss Fixtures

27 September 2023 Third round	Chelsea	1–0	Brighton & Hove Albion	Fulham
19:45 BST	Ugochukwu (yellow card) 45'; Jackson 50'	Report	Baleba (yellow card) 42'; Estupiñán (yellow card) 45'; Welbeck (yellow card) 90+9'	Stadium: Stamford Bridge; Attendance: 37,516; Referee: Thomas Bramall

=== UEFA Europa League ===
==== Group stage ====
Brighton were drawn into Group B, alongside Ajax, Marseille and AEK Athens.

Pos	Team	Pld	W	D	L	GF	GA	GD	Pts	Qualification	BHA	MAR	AJA	AEK
1	(England) Brighton & Hove Albion	6	4	1	1	10	5	+5	13	Advance to round of 16	—	1–0	2–0	2–3
2	(France) Marseille	6	3	2	1	14	10	+4	11	Advance to knockout round play-offs	2–2	—	4–3	3–1
3	(Netherlands) Ajax	6	1	2	3	10	13	−3	5	Transfer to Europa Conference League	0–2	3–3	—	3–1
4	(Greece) AEK Athens	6	1	1	4	6	12	−6	4		0–1	0–2	1–1	—

Source: UEFA
Rules for classification: Group stage tiebreakers

21 September 2023 1	Brighton & Hove Albion (England)	2–3	(Greece) AEK Athens	Falmer, England
20:00 BST	João Pedro 30' (pen.), 67' (pen.); Igor (yellow card) 47'; Estupiñán (yellow card) 66'; Van Hecke (yellow card) 76'; Welbeck (yellow card) 90+4'	Report	Sidibé 11', (yellow card) 47'; Gaćinović 40', (yellow card) 72'; Mitoglou (yellow card) 66'; Szymański (yellow card) 67'; Ponce (yellow card) 69', (goal) 84'; Eliasson (yellow card) 90'; Mantalos (yellow card) 90+8'; Mohammadi (yellow card) 90+10'	Stadium: Falmer Stadium; Attendance: 30,178; Referee: Kristo Tohver (Estonia)

5 October 2023 2	Marseille (France)	2–2	(England) Brighton & Hove Albion	Marseille, France
17:45 BST	Mbemba 19'; Veretout 20'; Sarr (yellow card) 84'; Clauss (yellow card) 87'; Balerdi (yellow card) 89'	Report	Groß 54', (yellow card) 56'; Veltman (yellow card) 84'; Dunk (yellow card) 84'; João Pedro 88' (pen.); Ferguson (yellow card) 90+5'	Stadium: Stade Vélodrome; Attendance: 63,465; Referee: Mykola Balakin (Ukraine)

26 October 2023 3	Brighton & Hove Albion (England)	2–0	(Netherlands) Ajax	Falmer, England
20:00 BST	Mitoma (yellow card) 23'; Van Hecke (yellow card) 31'; João Pedro 42'; Fati 53'	Report		Stadium: Falmer Stadium; Attendance: 30,540; Referee: Bartosz Frankowski (Poland)

9 November 2023 4	Ajax (Netherlands)	0–2	(England) Brighton & Hove Albion	Amsterdam, Netherlands
17:45 GMT		Report	Fati 15'; João Pedro (yellow card) 34'; Adingra 53'; Van Hecke (yellow card) 69'	Stadium: Johan Cruyff Arena; Attendance: 52,095; Referee: Nikola Dabanović (Montenegro)

30 November 2023 5	AEK Athens (Greece)	0–1	(England) Brighton & Hove Albion	Athens, Greece
17:45 GMT	Gaćinović (yellow card) 27' (yellow-red card) 65'; Zuber (yellow card) 63'	Report	Veltman (yellow card) 12'; João Pedro 55' (pen.)	Stadium: Agia Sophia Stadium; Attendance: 30,520; Referee: Sandro Schärer (Switzerland)

14 December 2023 6	Brighton & Hove Albion (England)	1–0	(France) Marseille	Falmer, England
20:00 GMT	Lallana (yellow card) 79'; Mitoma (yellow card) 84'; João Pedro 88', (yellow card) 89'; Steele (yellow card) 90+5'	Report	Mbemba (yellow card) 76'; Ounahi (yellow card) 79'; Sarr (yellow card) 90+4'	Stadium: Falmer Stadium; Attendance: 30,214; Referee: José María Sánchez Martínez (Spain)

==== Knockout phase ====
===== Round of 16 =====
The round of 16 draw was held on 23 February 2024, where Brighton were drawn against Italian club Roma.

7 March 2024 First leg	Roma (Italy)	4–0	(England) Brighton & Hove Albion	Rome, Italy
17:45 GMT	Dybala 13'; Lukaku 43'; Spinazzola (yellow card) 61'; Mancini 64'; Cristante 68'	Report	Van Hecke (yellow card) 39'; Lamptey (yellow card) 67'	Stadium: Stadio Olimpico; Attendance: 64,877; Referee: François Letexier (France)

14 March 2024 Second leg	Brighton & Hove Albion (England)	1–0 (1–4 agg.)	(Italy) Roma	Falmer, England
20:00 GMT	Lamptey (yellow card) 31'; Welbeck 37'; Estupiñán (yellow card) 40'	Report	Mancini (yellow card) 12'; Ndicka (yellow card) 35'; Pellegrini (yellow card) 40'; Svilar (yellow card) 45+1'; Çelik (yellow card) 86'	Stadium: Falmer Stadium; Attendance: 30,380; Referee: Felix Zwayer (Germany)

== Statistics ==
=== Appearances and goals ===
- Players listed with no appearances have been in the matchday squad but only as unused substitutes.

No.	Pos	Nat	Player	Total		Premier League		FA Cup		EFL Cup		UEFA Europa League	
No.	Pos	Nat	Player	Apps	Goals	Apps	Goals	Apps	Goals	Apps	Goals	Apps	Goals
Goalkeepers
1	GK	(Netherlands) NED	Bart Verbruggen	27	0	21	0	2	0	1	0	3	0
23	GK	(England) ENG	Jason Steele	23	0	17	0	1	0	0	0	5	0
38	GK	(Canada) CAN	Tom McGill	0	0	0	0	0	0	0	0	0	0
Defenders
2	DF	(Ghana) GHA	Tariq Lamptey	24	0	10+8	0	0+1	0	1	0	3+1	0
3	DF	(Brazil) BRA	Igor Julio	34	0	17+8	0	2	0	1	0	4+2	0
4	DF	(England) ENG	Adam Webster	18	0	13+2	0	1+1	0	0	0	0+1	0
5	DF	(England) ENG	Lewis Dunk	43	4	33	3	2+1	1	0	0	7	0
19	DF	(Argentina) ARG	Valentín Barco	7	0	3+3	0	0+1	0	0	0	0	0
29	DF	(Netherlands) NED	Jan Paul van Hecke	39	0	26+2	0	3	0	1	0	6+1	0
30	DF	(Ecuador) ECU	Pervis Estupiñán	27	3	15+4	2	3	1	1	0	2+2	0
34	DF	(Netherlands) NED	Joël Veltman	33	1	17+10	1	0	0	0	0	4+2	0
42	DF	(England) ENG	Odeluga Offiah	4	0	1+3	0	0	0	0	0	0	0
50	DF	(England) ENG	Ben Jackson	0	0	0	0	0	0	0	0	0	0
52	DF	(Republic of Ireland) IRL	Leigh Kavanagh	0	0	0	0	0	0	0	0	0	0
65	DF	(Germany) GER	Noël Atom	0	0	0	0	0	0	0	0	0	0
Midfielders
6	MF	(England) ENG	James Milner	20	0	11+4	0	0	0	0	0	3+2	0
7	MF	(England) ENG	Solly March	10	3	7	3	0	0	0+1	0	2	0
11	MF	(Scotland) SCO	Billy Gilmour	41	0	24+6	0	2	0	0+1	0	6+2	0
13	MF	(Germany) GER	Pascal Groß	47	5	34+2	4	3	0	0	0	8	1
14	MF	(England) ENG	Adam Lallana	30	0	13+12	0	0+2	0	0+1	0	1+1	0
15	MF	(Poland) POL	Jakub Moder	19	0	6+11	0	2	0	0	0	0	0
20	MF	(Cameroon) CMR	Carlos Baleba	37	0	15+12	0	0+3	0	1	0	0+6	0
22	MF	(Japan) JPN	Kaoru Mitoma	26	3	15+4	3	0	0	1	0	6	0
24	MF	(Ivory Coast) CIV	Simon Adingra	40	7	25+6	6	1	0	0	0	6+2	1
31	MF	(Spain) ESP	Ansu Fati	27	4	3+16	2	1	0	1	0	4+2	2
40	MF	(Argentina) ARG	Facundo Buonanotte	36	4	17+10	3	3	1	1	0	2+3	0
41	MF	(England) ENG	Jack Hinshelwood	17	3	8+4	3	2	0	0+1	0	2	0
44	MF	(Australia) AUS	Cameron Peupion	2	0	0	0	1+1	0	0	0	0	0
47	MF	(England) ENG	Benicio Baker-Boaitey	6	0	0+5	0	0+1	0	0	0	0	0
48	MF	(Tunisia) TUN	Samy Chouchane	0	0	0	0	0	0	0	0	0	0
53	MF	(England) ENG	Luca Barrington	0	0	0	0	0	0	0	0	0	0
Forwards
9	FW	(Brazil) BRA	João Pedro	40	20	19+12	9	2	5	1	0	5+1	6
10	FW	(Paraguay) PAR	Julio Enciso	15	0	5+7	0	0+1	0	0	0	2	0
18	FW	(England) ENG	Danny Welbeck	37	7	21+8	5	0+3	1	0+1	0	3+1	1
28	FW	(Republic of Ireland) IRL	Evan Ferguson	36	6	15+12	6	2	0	0	0	1+6	0
55	FW	(Republic of Ireland) IRL	Mark O'Mahony	3	0	1+2	0	0	0	0	0	0	0
56	FW	(England) ENG	Joshua Duffus	1	0	0	0	0	0	0	0	0+1	0
Squad players who left the club permanently or on loan during the season
8	MF	(Germany) GER	Mahmoud Dahoud	14	0	6+3	0	0	0	1	0	2+2	0
45	MF	(England) ENG	Jack Hinchy	1	0	0	0	0+1	0	0	0	0	0

Note

• Mahmoud Dahoud joined Stuttgart on 1 February on a season-long loan.

• Jack Hinchy joined Shrewsbury Town on 1 February on a season-long loan.

=== Goalscorers ===
Rnk	No	Pos	Nat	Name	Premier League	FA Cup	EFL Cup	Europa League	Total
1	9	FW	(Brazil)	João Pedro	9	5	0	6	20
2	24	MF	(Ivory Coast)	Simon Adingra	6	0	0	1	7
2	18	FW	(England)	Danny Welbeck	5	1	0	1	7
3	28	FW	(Republic of Ireland)	Evan Ferguson	6	0	0	0	6
4	13	MF	(Germany)	Pascal Groß	4	0	0	1	5
5	40	MF	(Argentina)	Facundo Buonanotte	3	1	0	0	4
5	5	DF	(England)	Lewis Dunk	3	1	0	0	4
5	31	MF	(Spain)	Ansu Fati	2	0	0	2	4
6	30	DF	(Ecuador)	Pervis Estupiñán	2	1	0	0	3
6	41	MF	(England)	Jack Hinshelwood	3	0	0	0	3
6	7	MF	(England)	Solly March	3	0	0	0	3
6	22	MF	(Japan)	Kaoru Mitoma	3	0	0	0	3
7	13	DF	(Netherlands)	Joël Veltman	1	0	0	0	1
Own goals					5	0	0	0	5
Total					55	9	0	11	75

=== Clean sheets ===
Rank	No.	Player	Premier League	FA Cup	EFL Cup	Europa League	Total
1	1	(Netherlands) Bart Verbruggen	4	0	0	3	7
2	23	(England) Jason Steele	2	0	0	2	4
Total			6	0	0	5	11
