= Tariq Lamptey =

Ghana international footballer (born 2000)

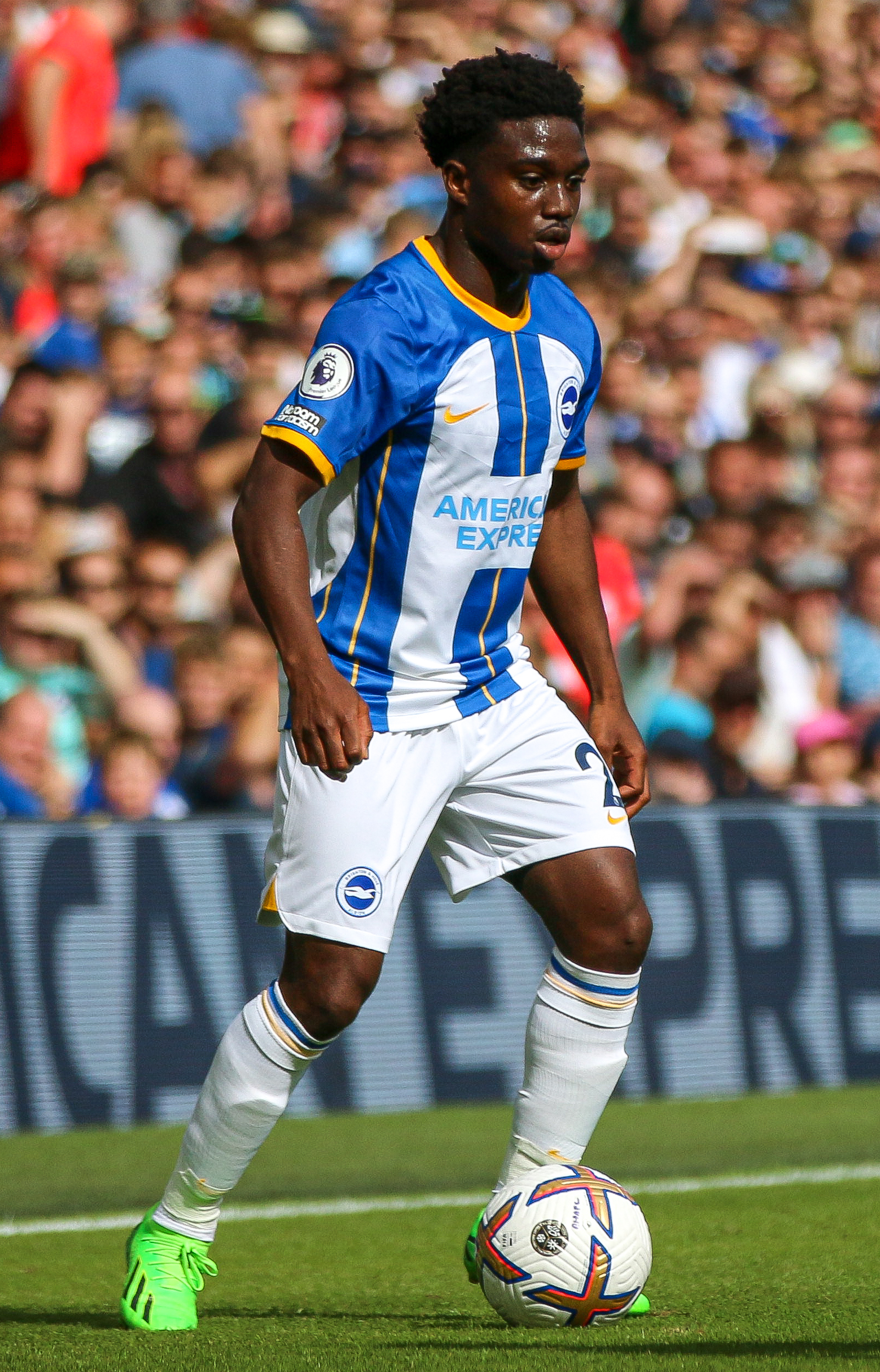
- Lamptey with Brighton & Hove Albion in 2022

Personal information
- Full name: Tariq Kwame Nii-Lante Lamptey
- Date of birth: 30 September 2000 (age 26)
- Place of birth: Hillingdon, England
- Height: 1.63 m (5 ft 4 in)
- Positions: Right wing-back; right-back

Team information
- Current team: Queens Park Rangers
- Number: 48

Youth career
- 2006–2008: Larkspur Rovers
- 2008–2019: Chelsea

Senior career*
Years	Team	Apps	(Gls)
2019–2020	Chelsea	1	(0)
2020–2025	Brighton & Hove Albion	103	(3)
2025–2026	Fiorentina	2	(0)
2026–	Queens Park Rangers	6	(0)

International career^{‡}
2018	England U18	3	(0)
2018–2019	England U19	9	(1)
2019	England U20	6	(0)
2020	England U21	2	(0)
2022–2024	Ghana	11	(0)
- * Club domestic league appearances and goals as of 01:47, 10 October 2026 (UTC) ‡ National team caps and goals as of 15:04, 15 October 2024 (UTC)

Tariq Kwame Nii-Lante Lamptey (born 30 September 2000) is a Ghanaian professional footballer who plays as a right wing-back or right-back for EFL Championship club Queens Park Rangers. Born in England, he plays for the Ghana national team.

Previously a youth international for England, Lamptey switched allegiances to represent Ghana at senior international level and made his debut in 2022.

== Club career ==
=== Chelsea ===
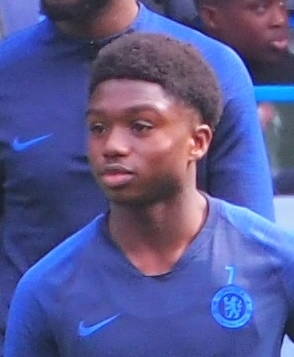
Lamptey, aged 18, playing for Chelsea in 2019

Lamptey was born in Hillingdon, Greater London. He was playing grassroots football for his local team, Larkspur Rovers, before joining the Chelsea academy at the age of eight.

On 29 December 2019, Lamptey made his first-team debut away against Arsenal in the Premier League, replacing Fikayo Tomori in the 59th minute where he was a lively presence helping Chelsea come back from 1–0 down to win 2–1. Speaking to Chelsea TV after the game, Lamptey described how nervous he was making his debut: "My heart was racing, this is the moment me and my family have been waiting for." Lamptey became the seventh academy graduate to make a first-team appearance during Frank Lampard's managerial tenure at Chelsea, following in the footsteps of Mason Mount, Billy Gilmour, Reece James, Marc Guéhi, Tino Anjorin and Ian Maatsen. Lamptey made two more appearances for Chelsea, both coming in the FA Cup wins over Nottingham Forest at home and Hull City away before leaving the club.

=== Brighton & Hove Albion ===
On 31 January 2020, Lamptey signed for Premier League club Brighton & Hove Albion on a three-and-a-half-year contract. He made an impressive debut for Brighton in his first Premier League start, a 0–0 away draw against Leicester City on 23 June – Brighton's second match back from the Premier League's temporary break due to the COVID-19 pandemic.

Lamptey started in Brighton's opening match of the 2020–21 season against his former club Chelsea in which he set up Leandro Trossard's goal in a 3–1 home defeat. He scored his first goal on 1 November in a 2–1 Premier League defeat away to Tottenham Hotspur. Lamptey was sent off for the first time in his career on 21 November after receiving two yellow cards in the 2–1 away victory against Aston Villa. On 17 January 2021, Lamptey signed a new three-and-a-half-year contract with Brighton. On 12 March, after being sidelined since picking up a hamstring injury in a 0–0 away draw against Fulham on 16 December 2020, it was announced that Lamptey would miss the remainder of the season due to the injury.

Lamptey made his return to a matchday squad for the first time in nine months on 19 September 2021, remaining as an unused substitute in Brighton's 2–1 home win over Leicester. Three days later, he made his first competitive appearance since December 2020, starting and playing the first half of the 2–0 victory at home to Swansea City in the EFL Cup third round. Lamptey made his first league appearance in 10 months on 16 October 2021, when he came on as a 59th-minute substitute in a 0–0 draw away to Norwich City. He made his first Premier League start since returning from injury in a 1–1 home draw against Newcastle United on 6 November, playing 75 minutes. On 7 May, he came on as a 76th-minute substitute in Brighton's biggest top flight victory, a 4–0 home win over Manchester United.

Lamptey scored his second goal for Brighton with the team's third in a 3–1 victory away to Arsenal on 9 November in the EFL Cup third round. He did not start a Premier League match in the 2022–23 season until his 13th appearance, when he played the whole match in a 4–2 home loss to Arsenal on 31 December. On 4 March 2023, Lamptey limped off after 15 minutes off the 4–0 home win over West Ham, in what would be his last action of the season due to the knee injury, as Brighton went on to seal a spot in the 2023–24 UEFA Europa League.

He made his return to action on 2 September 2023, Brighton's fourth match of the 2023–24 season. Coming on as a 77th-minute substitute, he made some positive runs and also picking up a yellow card in the 3–1 home win over Newcastle.

On 9 June 2025, Brighton activated a one-year extension clause in his contract, renewing his deal until 30 June 2026.

=== Fiorentina ===
On 1 September 2025, Lamptey joined Serie A club Fiorentina for a reported €6 million plus add-ons. However, just a few weeks after signing with the club, he suffered an anterior cruciate ligament tear during a match against Como on 21 September, undergoing reconstructive surgery three days later. He was slated to miss five to six months of play. On 11 May 2026, Lamptey terminated his contract with Fiorentina by mutual agreement, having only made two appearances off the bench for the side.

=== Queens Park Rangers ===
On 21 July 2026, Lamptey joined EFL Championship club Queens Park Rangers on a free transfer.

== International career ==
Lamptey was born in England to Ghanaian parents. He has been a youth international for England, having represented the Young Lions from under-18 to under-21 level.

In July 2020, he was contacted by the Ghana Football Association about potentially switching allegiances to represent Ghana. However, on 8 September, Lamptey made his England under-21 debut, starting in a 2–1 away victory over Austria in a 2021 UEFA European Under-21 Championship qualifier. After 18 months out of the under-21 team due to injury, he then made his return to the side in March 2022, taking part in the 2023 European Under-21 Championship qualification matches against Andorra and Albania.

In May 2022, it was announced that Lamptey was considering switching allegiances to Ghana, with England under-21 manager Lee Carsley saying that Lamptey had "asked to be left out of the squad for a bit of head space." After months of further speculation, in July the president of the Ghana FA, Kurt Okraku, announced that Lamptey was one of the few players that were officially made eligible to represent Ghana. Lamptey made his debut on 23 September, coming on as a 72nd-minute substitute, replacing Denis Odoi in a 3–0 friendly loss against Brazil at the Stade Océane in Le Havre.

On 14 November, Lamptey was named in Ghana's 26-man squad for the 2022 FIFA World Cup.

== Career statistics ==
=== Club ===
As of match played 29 August 2026

Appearances and goals by club, season and competition
Club	Season	League			National cup (Note: Includes FA Cup)		League cup (Note: Includes EFL Cup)		Europe		Other		Total	
Club	Season	Division	Apps	Goals	Apps	Goals	Apps	Goals	Apps	Goals	Apps	Goals	Apps	Goals
Chelsea U21	2018–19	—			—		—		—		4 (Note: Appearances in EFL Trophy)	0	4	0
Chelsea U21	2019–20	—			—		—		—		3	2	3	2
Chelsea U21	Total		—		—		—		—		7	2	7	2
Chelsea	2019–20	Premier League	1	0	2	0	0	0	0	0	0	0	3	0
Brighton & Hove Albion	2019–20	Premier League	8	0	—		—		—		—		8	0
Brighton & Hove Albion	2020–21	Premier League	11	1	0	0	0	0	—		—		11	1
Brighton & Hove Albion	2021–22	Premier League	30	0	1	0	1	0	—		—		32	0
Brighton & Hove Albion	2022–23	Premier League	20	0	3	0	3	1	—		—		26	1
Brighton & Hove Albion	2023–24	Premier League	19	0	1	0	1	0	4 (Note: Appearances in UEFA Europa League)	0	—		25	0
Brighton & Hove Albion	2024–25	Premier League	15	2	2	0	3	1	—		—		20	3
Brighton & Hove Albion	Total		103	3	7	0	8	2	4	0	—		122	5
Fiorentina	2025–26	Serie A	2	0	0	0	—		0	0	—		2	0
Queens Park Rangers	2026–27	Championship	2	0	0	0	0	0	—		—		2	0
Career total			108	3	9	0	8	2	4	0	7	2	136	7

=== International ===
As of match played 15 October 2024

Appearances and goals by national team and year
National team	Year	Apps	Goals
Ghana	2022	4	0
Ghana	2024	7	0
Total		11	0

== Honours ==
Chelsea U18

- U18 Premier League: 2016–17, 2017–18
- FA Youth Cup: 2016–17, 2017–18
- U18 Premier League Cup: 2017–18
