= Hinshelwood =

Hinshelwood is a surname. Notable people with the surname include:

== Hinshelwood footballing family ==
- Wally Hinshelwood (1929–2018), English former footballer
  - Martin Hinshelwood (born 1953), English former footballer; son of Wally
    - Danny Hinshelwood (born 1975), English former footballer; son of Martin
  - Paul Hinshelwood (1956–2022), English former footballer; son of Wally
    - Adam Hinshelwood (born 1984), English former footballer; son of Paul
      - Jack Hinshelwood (born 2005), English footballer; son of Adam

== Others ==
- Cyril Norman Hinshelwood (1897–1967), English chemist
- Sandy Hinshelwood (born 1942), Scottish rugby player
  - Ben Hinshelwood (born 1977), Australian-born Scottish rugby player; son of Sandy
