= 1968–69 Sussex County Football League =

The 1968–69 Sussex County Football League season was the 44th in the history of Sussex County Football League, a football competition in England.

== Division One ==
Sussex County Football League Division One
- Season: 1968–69
- Champions: Southwick
- Relegated: Selsey; Wigmore Athletic
- Matches played: 240
- Goals scored: 867 (3.61 per match)

Division One featured 14 clubs which competed in the division last season, along with two new clubs, promoted from Division Two:

- Whitehawk
- Wigmore Athletic

=== League table ===
Pos	Team	Pld	W	D	L	GF	GA	GR	Pts	Qualification or relegation
1	Southwick	30	25	2	3	91	23	3.957	52	
2	Arundel	30	19	4	7	78	51	1.529	42	
3	Chichester City	30	17	7	6	78	35	2.229	41	
4	Bexhill Town Athletic	30	16	5	9	57	44	1.295	37	
5	Littlehampton Town	30	15	5	10	47	37	1.270	35	
6	Rye United	30	12	9	9	42	35	1.200	33	
7	Horsham YMCA	30	14	3	13	60	54	1.111	31	
8	Whitehawk	30	13	5	12	44	51	0.863	31	
9	East Grinstead	30	13	3	14	63	60	1.050	29	
10	Haywards Heath	30	11	6	13	48	45	1.067	28	
11	Seaford Town	30	9	7	14	44	59	0.746	25	
12	Wadhurst	30	9	5	16	48	66	0.727	23	
13	Sidley United	30	8	7	15	41	60	0.683	23	
14	Bognor Regis Town	30	8	4	18	53	74	0.716	20	
15	Selsey	30	6	4	20	44	85	0.518	16	Relegated to Division Two
16	Wigmore Athletic	30	4	6	20	29	88	0.330	14	Relegated to Division Two

Source: nonleaguematters
Rules for classification: 1) points; 2) goal ratio.

== Division Two ==
Sussex County Football League Division Two
- Season: 1968–69
- Champions: Ringmer
- Promoted: Ringmer; Three Bridges
- Matches played: 210
- Goals scored: 810 (3.86 per match)

Division Two featured 13 clubs which competed in the division last season, along with two new clubs, relegated from Division One:

- Lancing
- Newhaven

=== League table ===
Pos	Team	Pld	W	D	L	GF	GA	GR	Pts	Qualification or relegation
1	Ringmer	28	20	4	4	74	35	2.114	44	Promoted to Division One
2	Three Bridges	28	20	3	5	74	25	2.960	43	Promoted to Division One
3	Lancing	28	17	9	2	75	28	2.679	43	
4	Newhaven	28	15	6	7	81	47	1.723	36	
5	Portfield	28	15	5	8	61	37	1.649	35	
6	Shoreham	28	12	8	8	51	42	1.214	32	
7	Steyning	28	10	11	7	38	34	1.118	31	
8	Ferring	28	10	5	13	47	59	0.797	25	
9	Hastings Rangers	28	8	6	14	59	82	0.720	22	
10	Old Varndeanians	28	9	3	16	50	58	0.862	21	
11	Hastings & St Leonards	28	8	5	15	42	58	0.724	21	
12	APV Athletic	28	9	3	16	47	72	0.653	21	
13	Burgess Hill	28	8	4	16	43	59	0.729	20	
14	Brighton Old Grammarians	28	6	6	16	36	66	0.545	18	Resigned from the league
15	Wick	28	3	2	23	32	108	0.296	8	

Source: nonleaguematters
Rules for classification: 1) points; 2) goal ratio.
