= 2001–02 in English football =

Football in England
- Season: 2001–02

Men's football
- FA Premier League: Arsenal
- First Division: Manchester City
- Second Division: Brighton & Hove Albion
- Third Division: Plymouth Argyle
- Football Conference: Boston United
- FA Cup: Arsenal
- Football League Trophy: Blackpool
- League Cup: Blackburn Rovers
- Charity Shield: Liverpool

Women's football
- Premier League National Division: Arsenal
- Premier League Northern Division: Birmingham City
- Premier League Southern Division: Fulham
- FA Women's Cup: Fulham
- Premier League Cup: Fulham

The 2001–02 season was the 122nd season of competitive football in England.

== Events ==
=== Arsenal cruise to title glory ===
In what had earlier been one of the most closely fought Premiership title races for years, Arsenal won the championship by a seven-point margin. Their crown was won in the penultimate game of the season when they beat defending champions Manchester United 1–0 at Old Trafford. Four days earlier, they had also won the FA Cup with a 2–0 victory over Chelsea at the Millennium Stadium, Cardiff.

Their top scorer, Thierry Henry, was on target 24 times in the league alone.

One downside to the season was Arsenal's failure to progress to the quarter-finals of the UEFA Champions League.

=== Sir Alex puts off his retirement ===
Sir Alex Ferguson announced in February that he would be postponing his retirement as Manchester United manager by at least three more seasons after he signed a new contract as manager. The news came just after United completed an impressive revival in the Premiership which saw them rise from ninth to first in the space of two months.

On 8 December, United stood ninth in the Premiership – 11 points behind Liverpool, who had a game in hand – and had lost five of their seven previous games in the aftermath of a 1–0 defeat at home to West Ham United. Even a UEFA Cup place appeared beyond reach. An eight-match winning run, however, saw United cruise to the top of the Premiership and they were soon challenging a three-horse race with Liverpool and Arsenal. It was not until the second-last match that the team was eliminated from the competition, as they lost to Arsenal by a scoreline of 1–0 and thus conceded the title to their rivals.

United's failure was largely put down to the inability to find a suitable replacement for Jaap Stam, the Dutch central defender who had been sold to Lazio for £16.25 million just after the start of the season. Another disappointment was the failure of Juan Sebastián Verón at £28.1 million, the most expensive player ever to sign for an English club, to never live up to his hefty price tag. On a positive note, Dutch striker Ruud van Nistelrooy lived up to his £19 million price tag by scoring 36 goals in all competitions during his first season at Old Trafford, breaking the club record that had been set by Dennis Viollet 40 seasons earlier.

After the season concluded, rumours began to circulate that Ferguson was about to break the English transfer record once again and sign Leeds United central-back Rio Ferdinand in the hope that his side would return to their winning ways in 2002–03.

=== Ipswich fall from grace ===
A year after qualifying for the UEFA Cup and earning George Burley the Manager of the Year award, Ipswich Town dropped back into Division One. The Suffolk side had looked doomed by Christmas after winning just one of their first 18 Premiership games. Then came a turnaround in form which saw them win seven out of eight fixtures and climb to 12th place, suggesting that they were safe. But another decline set in, and this time Ipswich were unable to halt it. Their relegation was confirmed with a 5–0 defeat away to runners-up Liverpool on the final day of the season.

Joining Ipswich in Division One would be already doomed Derby County and Leicester City, both going down after six seasons in the Premiership, the last of which had seen three different men take charge of the team.

=== West Brom and Birmingham back in the big time ===
West Bromwich Albion and Birmingham City, who had last played in the top flight in 1985–86, were finally promoted back to the top division with Albion as Division One runners-up and Birmingham as playoff winners. Albion had overtaken another local rival in Wolverhampton Wanderers, which had been out of the top flight even longer, in the race for the run for second place by winning seven of their final nine league games. Birmingham's triumph was sealed by a penalty-shoot out win over Norwich at the Millennium Stadium. They followed champions Manchester City, managed by Kevin Keegan, into the Premiership.

==== The Battle of Bramall Lane ====
One of the seven Albion wins in their promotion run came on 16 March 2002, against Sheffield United at Bramall Lane. This match would turn into one of the most ill-tempered in recent English football history, with three United players sent off, two of them for violent conduct in the second half. The match was abandoned with Albion up 3–0 after two other United players came up injured, reducing them to six players. Ultimately, The FA let the 3–0 scoreline stand.

=== Back to back for Brighton ===
Brighton & Hove Albion secured successive title winning promotions. This was a massive turnaround for the fortunes of the club which had between 1996 and 1998 finished second bottom of the football league and were on the verge of going out of business.

=== ITV Digital crisis plunges league clubs into turmoil ===
The collapse of debt-ridden ITV Digital in May 2002 plunged many Football League clubs into turmoil. The likes of Bradford City, Bury, Nottingham Forest, Watford, Barnsley, Lincoln City and Port Vale filed for administration, fearful that the drastic loss of revenue would put them out of business.

Of all the troubled clubs, Bradford City's situation was the most precarious. The West Yorkshire club had debts of £36 million and had failed to meet a deadline for a takeover deal. It seemed inevitable that the Bantams, who had gone into liquidation in 1983, would endure a total collapse and lose their place in the Football League. Their only hope was for the Football League to ignore their financial plight and allow them a place in Division One for the 2002–03 season.

=== Dario reaches managerial milestone ===
On 20 November 2001, Dario Gradi took charge of his 1,000 competitive game in charge of Crewe Alexandra in Division One. Gradi had arrived at Crewe in June 1983, and he reached this landmark just four months into a season which had already seen a total of more than 20 managerial changes in the Premiership, Division One, Division Two and Division Three. Crewe ended the season by being relegated to Division Two but the club's directors showed no intention of parting company with the longest-serving manager at any Football League club.

=== Wimbledon get go-ahead for Milton Keynes move ===
Just after the end of the Division one season, a three-man panel of The FA gave permission for Wimbledon FC to move from their historic South London home to Milton Keynes. The move sparked outrage among Wimbledon supporters, who formed their own club – AFC Wimbledon – in response to the controversial plans of chairman Charles Koppel.

== League tables ==
=== FA Premier League ===
Arsenal won their second Premier League title in five seasons, as well as their second double in the same period, after a remarkable season in which they fought with the rest of the top six for the title right up until the final stages. They scored in every Premier League game, were unbeaten away from home, and finished the league season with 13 successive wins – and also had the satisfaction of clinching the title with a win over Manchester United at Old Trafford in their penultimate game. Liverpool's second-place finish was their highest for 11 years, ending Manchester United's top-two run which had started after theirs had ended. United had rallied well and led the league for a while after losing six league games between mid September and early December, but dropped points in the final two months of the season left them ten points behind Arsenal at the season's end. Newcastle United finished fourth, their highest position for five years, in their third season under the management of 69-year-old Bobby Robson.

Leeds United and Chelsea had to settle for UEFA Cup qualification after losing ground in the closing stages of the title race. Leeds's failure to qualify for the Champions League would trigger a financial implosion that would eventually see them relegated to the third tier and almost be expelled from the Football League within five years.

For the first time in 12 years, all three newly-promoted sides avoided relegation. Blackburn Rovers fared the best, finishing 10th and winning the League Cup, thereby qualifying for the UEFA Cup. Fulham survived relatively comfortably, though a 13th-place finish was considered underwhelming, as their being managed by the highly regarded Jean Tigana and a substantial investment in players had caused most pundits to tip them to challenge for the European spots. Bolton Wanderers' strong start to the season meant that they survived in 16th place, despite their lacklustre form for much of the rest of the season.

Leicester City's final season at Filbert Street, their home for 111 years, ended in relegation after just five league game wins. Joining them in Division One were their local rivals Derby County, who had been promoted alongside them six years earlier. Derby had finished not far above the relegation zone in the previous two campaigns, but Leicester had been a top 10 side as recently as two years before their relegation, when they had also won their second League Cup in four seasons.

Last to go down were Ipswich Town, who had revived themselves mid-season after a disastrous start, but were unable to halt it after another slide towards the end of the campaign and any hopes of survival were ended on the final day of the season when they were crushed by Liverpool, just one year after qualifying for Europe (albeit they would return to Europe via the Fair Play Award). Sunderland, who had fallen just one place short of Europe in the previous two seasons, came just one place away from relegation.

Pos	Team	Pld	W	D	L	GF	GA	GD	Pts	Qualification or relegation
1	Arsenal (C)	38	26	9	3	79	36	+43	87	Qualification for the Champions League first group stage
2	Liverpool	38	24	8	6	67	30	+37	80	Qualification for the Champions League first group stage
3	Manchester United	38	24	5	9	87	45	+42	77	Qualification for the Champions League third qualifying round
4	Newcastle United	38	21	8	9	74	52	+22	71	Qualification for the Champions League third qualifying round
5	Leeds United	38	18	12	8	53	37	+16	66	Qualification for the UEFA Cup first round (Note: Since Arsenal qualified for the Champions League, their UEFA Cup place as FA Cup winners defaulted to Chelsea, the losing finalists.)
6	Chelsea	38	17	13	8	66	38	+28	64	Qualification for the UEFA Cup first round
7	West Ham United	38	15	8	15	48	57	−9	53	
8	Aston Villa	38	12	14	12	46	47	−1	50	Qualification for the Intertoto Cup third round
9	Tottenham Hotspur	38	14	8	16	49	53	−4	50	
10	Blackburn Rovers	38	12	10	16	55	51	+4	46	Qualification for the UEFA Cup first round (Note: Blackburn Rovers qualified for the UEFA Cup as League Cup winners.)
11	Southampton	38	12	9	17	46	54	−8	45	
12	Middlesbrough	38	12	9	17	35	47	−12	45	
13	Fulham	38	10	14	14	36	44	−8	44	Qualification for the Intertoto Cup second round
14	Charlton Athletic	38	10	14	14	38	49	−11	44	
15	Everton	38	11	10	17	45	57	−12	43	
16	Bolton Wanderers	38	9	13	16	44	62	−18	40	
17	Sunderland	38	10	10	18	29	51	−22	40	
18	Ipswich Town (R)	38	9	9	20	41	64	−23	36	UEFA Cup QR and relegation to the First Division (Note: Ipswich Town qualified for the UEFA Cup qualifying as the winners of Premiership Fair Play League by The Football Association, and as one of the UEFA Fair Play ranking winners.)
19	Derby County (R)	38	8	6	24	33	63	−30	30	Relegation to the Football League First Division
20	Leicester City (R)	38	5	13	20	30	64	−34	28	Relegation to the Football League First Division

Source: Premier League
Rules for classification: 1) points; 2) goal difference; 3) number of goals scored.
(C) Champions; (R) Relegated
Notes:

Leading goalscorer: Thierry Henry (Arsenal), 24

=== First Division ===
Manchester City managed to make an immediate return from the previous season's relegation, and returned to the Premier League as champions. West Bromwich Albion built on their surprise play-off appearance the previous year, achieving automatic promotion to the top-flight for the first time since 1986 at the expense of local rivals Wolves, who had looked all set for promotion just weeks earlier, but went out of the playoffs against Norwich. The play-offs were won by Birmingham City, finally earning promotion after three successive disappointments, and also returning to the top flight for the first time since 1986.

Burnley finished seventh for the second season running, only missing out on the playoffs on goal difference. Local rivals Preston finished eighth, with former Scotland manager Craig Brown now at the helm after David Moyes left for Everton.

Stockport County endured a dismal season despite the high-profile appointment of Carlton Palmer as manager, and fell into Division Two. Barnsley also went down, despite a play-off final appearance only two years previously. The final relegation spot was filled by Crewe, who for once were unable to pull off a survival act.

Pos	Team	Pld	W	D	L	GF	GA	GD	Pts	Qualification or relegation
1	Manchester City (C, P)	46	31	6	9	108	52	+56	99	Promotion to the Premier League
2	West Bromwich Albion (P)	46	27	8	11	61	29	+32	89	Promotion to the Premier League
3	Wolverhampton Wanderers	46	25	11	10	76	43	+33	86	Qualification for the First Division play-offs
4	Millwall	46	22	11	13	69	48	+21	77	Qualification for the First Division play-offs
5	Birmingham City (O, P)	46	21	13	12	70	49	+21	76	Qualification for the First Division play-offs
6	Norwich City	46	22	9	15	60	51	+9	75	Qualification for the First Division play-offs
7	Burnley	46	21	12	13	70	62	+8	75	
8	Preston North End	46	20	12	14	71	59	+12	72	
9	Wimbledon	46	18	13	15	63	57	+6	67	
10	Crystal Palace	46	20	6	20	70	62	+8	66	
11	Coventry City	46	20	6	20	59	53	+6	66	
12	Gillingham	46	18	10	18	64	67	−3	64	
13	Sheffield United	46	15	15	16	53	54	−1	60	
14	Watford	46	16	11	19	62	56	+6	59	
15	Bradford City	46	15	10	21	69	76	−7	55	
16	Nottingham Forest	46	12	18	16	50	51	−1	54	
17	Portsmouth	46	13	14	19	60	72	−12	53	
18	Walsall	46	13	12	21	51	71	−20	51	
19	Grimsby Town	46	12	14	20	50	72	−22	50	
20	Sheffield Wednesday	46	12	14	20	49	71	−22	50	
21	Rotherham United	46	10	19	17	52	66	−14	49	
22	Crewe Alexandra (R)	46	12	13	21	47	76	−29	49	Relegation to the Second Division
23	Barnsley (R)	46	11	15	20	59	86	−27	48	Relegation to the Second Division
24	Stockport County (R)	46	6	8	32	42	102	−60	26	Relegation to the Second Division

Rules for classification: 1) Points; 2) Goal difference; 3) Goals scored
(C) Champions; (O) Play-off winners; (P) Promoted; (R) Relegated

Top Goalscorer: Shaun Goater (Manchester City) – 28

=== Second Division ===
Brighton earned a second successive championship, despite the loss of manager Micky Adams early in the season – however, they would also have to cope with the loss of replacement manager Peter Taylor after the season ended. Reading earned the runners-up spot after four seasons in Division Two, and the play-offs were won by Stoke City who, despite this success, sacked manager Gudjon Thordarson immediately afterwards (leaving Reading in the odd position of being the only top six side to start the 2002–03 season with the same manager that they had at the start of the 2001–02 season).

QPR came out of administration at the end of a season where they finished a respectable eighth in their first campaign at this level since the 1960s, featuring in the race for a playoff place until the penultimate game of the season. Wigan Athletic finished a disappointing tenth after successive playoff appearances, but kept faith in manager Paul Jewell to deliver promotion in his second season at the helm.

Cambridge United were cut adrift early in the season, and never looked to have much chance of surviving. Long-time Division Two members Wrexham never recovered from a bad start, and also went down. Bury suffered a financial crisis off the pitch and the effects of this ultimately affected the team's performance and sent them down to the League's bottom tier. The final relegation spot was filled by AFC Bournemouth.

Pos	Team	Pld	W	D	L	GF	GA	GD	Pts	Promotion or relegation
1	Brighton & Hove Albion (C, P)	46	25	15	6	66	42	+24	90	Promotion to Football League First Division
2	Reading (P)	46	23	15	8	70	43	+27	84	Promotion to Football League First Division
3	Brentford	46	24	11	11	77	43	+34	83	Qualification for the Second Division play-offs
4	Cardiff City	46	23	14	9	75	50	+25	83	Qualification for the Second Division play-offs
5	Stoke City (O, P)	46	23	11	12	67	40	+27	80	Qualification for the Second Division play-offs
6	Huddersfield Town	46	21	15	10	65	47	+18	78	Qualification for the Second Division play-offs
7	Bristol City	46	21	10	15	68	53	+15	73	
8	Queens Park Rangers	46	19	14	13	60	49	+11	71	
9	Oldham Athletic	46	18	16	12	77	65	+12	70	
10	Wigan Athletic	46	16	16	14	66	51	+15	64	
11	Wycombe Wanderers	46	17	13	16	58	64	−6	64	
12	Tranmere Rovers	46	16	15	15	63	60	+3	63	
13	Swindon Town	46	15	14	17	46	56	−10	59	
14	Port Vale	46	16	10	20	51	62	−11	58	
15	Colchester United	46	15	12	19	65	76	−11	57	
16	Blackpool	46	14	14	18	66	69	−3	56	
17	Peterborough United	46	15	10	21	64	59	+5	55	
18	Chesterfield	46	13	13	20	53	65	−12	52	
19	Notts County	46	13	11	22	59	71	−12	50	
20	Northampton Town	46	14	7	25	54	79	−25	49	
21	Bournemouth (R)	46	10	14	22	56	71	−15	44	Relegation to Football League Third Division
22	Bury (R)	46	11	11	24	43	75	−32	44	Relegation to Football League Third Division
23	Wrexham (R)	46	11	10	25	56	89	−33	43	Relegation to Football League Third Division
24	Cambridge United (R)	46	7	13	26	47	93	−46	34	Relegation to Football League Third Division

Rules for classification: In the Football League goals scored (GF) takes precedence over goal difference (GD).
(C) Champions; (O) Play-off winners; (P) Promoted; (R) Relegated

Leading goalscorer: Bobby Zamora (Brighton and Hove Albion) – 28

=== Third Division ===
Plymouth and Luton were involved in a close fight for the divisional title for the whole season; ultimately Plymouth won out, with Luton taking the runners-up spot and making an immediate return to Division Two after going down the previous season. The third automatic spot was closely contested between Mansfield and Cheltenham; Mansfield were the ultimate victors despite some poor results late in the season, but Cheltenham would win promotion anyway through the play-offs.

This was the final season where only a single team would drop out of the League into the Conference. Ultimately there proved to be little drama about who would go down, as it became obvious from the first few weeks that Halifax Town were doomed, never managing to earn enough wins to have any serious chance of survival.

Pos	Team	Pld	W	D	L	GF	GA	GD	Pts	Qualification or relegation
1	Plymouth Argyle (C, P)	46	31	9	6	71	28	+43	102	Promotion to Football League Second Division
2	Luton Town (P)	46	30	7	9	96	48	+48	97	Promotion to Football League Second Division
3	Mansfield Town (P)	46	24	7	15	72	60	+12	79	Promotion to Football League Second Division
4	Cheltenham Town (O, P)	46	21	15	10	66	49	+17	78	Qualification for the Third Division play-offs
5	Rochdale	46	21	15	10	65	52	+13	78	Qualification for the Third Division play-offs
6	Rushden & Diamonds	46	20	13	13	69	53	+16	73	Qualification for the Third Division play-offs
7	Hartlepool United	46	20	11	15	74	48	+26	71	Qualification for the Third Division play-offs
8	Scunthorpe United	46	19	14	13	74	56	+18	71	
9	Shrewsbury Town	46	20	10	16	64	53	+11	70	
10	Kidderminster Harriers	46	19	9	18	56	47	+9	66	
11	Hull City	46	16	13	17	57	51	+6	61	
12	Southend United	46	15	13	18	51	54	−3	58	
13	Macclesfield Town	46	15	13	18	41	52	−11	58	
14	York City	46	16	9	21	54	67	−13	57	
15	Darlington	46	15	11	20	60	71	−11	56	
16	Exeter City	46	14	13	19	48	73	−25	55	
17	Carlisle United	46	12	16	18	49	56	−7	52	
18	Leyton Orient	46	13	13	20	55	71	−16	52	
19	Torquay United	46	12	15	19	46	63	−17	51	
20	Swansea City	46	13	12	21	53	77	−24	51	
21	Oxford United	46	11	14	21	53	62	−9	47	
22	Lincoln City	46	10	16	20	44	62	−18	46	
23	Bristol Rovers	46	11	12	23	40	60	−20	45	
24	Halifax Town (R)	46	8	12	26	39	84	−45	36	Relegation to Football Conference

Rules for classification: 1) Points; 2) Goal difference; 3) Goals scored
(C) Champions; (O) Play-off winners; (P) Promoted; (R) Relegated

Leading goalscorer: Steve Howard (Luton Town) – 24

== Diary of the season ==
- 21 June 2001 – Liverpool sign Norway defender John Arne Riise from Monaco for £4.6 million.
- 25 June 2001 – Newcastle United pay £6million to Coventry City for winger Craig Bellamy.
- 26 June 2001 – After a year with Barcelona, Emmanuel Petit returns to England to join Chelsea in a £7.5 million deal.
- 4 July 2001 – Charlton Athletic pay a club record £4.75million for Wimbledon striker Jason Euell.
- 9 July 2001 – Goalkeeper Ian Walker who has spent his entire 13-year playing career at Tottenham Hotspur, joins Leicester City for £2.5 million.
- 11 July 2001 – Rory Delap becomes Southampton's most expensive player in a £4 million move from Derby County. Middlesbrough sign Aston Villa defender Gareth Southgate for £6 million. Also on his way out of Villa Park is goalkeeper David James, in a £3.5 million move to West Ham United.
- 12 July 2001 – Manchester United break the English transfer fee record by paying Lazio £28.1 million for Argentina midfielder Juan Sebastián Verón.
- 17 July 2001 – Everton sign Canadian striker Tomasz Radzinski from Anderlecht for £4.5 million.
- 20 July 2001 – Liverpool sell Christian Ziege to Tottenham Hotspur for £4 million.
- 27 July 2001 – Manchester United sign Northern Ireland goalkeeper Roy Carroll from Wigan Athletic for £2.5 million.
- 1 August 2001 – Fulham sign Dutch goalkeeper Edwin van der Sar from Juventus for £5 million.
- 2 August 2001 – Coventry City striker John Hartson joins Celtic for £6 million.
- 5 August 2001 – Portsmouth goalkeeper Aaron Flahavan, 25, is killed in a car crash just outside Bournemouth.
- 8 August 2001 – Coventry City pay £5 million (a record for a Division One club) for West Bromwich Albion striker Lee Hughes.
- 16 August 2001 – Oxford United move into their new 12,500-seat Kassam Stadium after six years of waiting, but their arrival is soured by a 2–1 home defeat against Rochdale in Division Three.
- 17 August 2001 – Everton sell defender Michael Ball to Rangers F.C. for £6.5 million.
- 18 August 2001 – The Premier League season begins with newly promoted Bolton Wanderers winning 5–0 at Leicester City.
- 19 August 2001 –
  - Former Coventry City, Luton Town, Manchester United, Aston Villa, Blackpool and West Ham United goalkeeper Les Sealey dies of a heart attack at the age of 43.
  - Defending league champions Manchester United are host to Fulham in their first top flight game since 1968. United win 3–2, with new signing Ruud van Nistelrooy scoring twice for United while Louis Saha scores both of Fulham's consolation goals.
- 25 August 2001 – Southampton lose 2–0 to Chelsea in their first competitive game at the new 32,689-seat St Mary's Stadium. Bolton completed a three-match winning start to the season by beating Liverpool 2–1 at the Reebok Stadium.
- 27 August 2001 – Jaap Stam, who recently revealed in his autobiography that Manchester United approached him without his club's permission when signing him three years ago, joins Lazio for £16.25 million.
- 31 August 2001 – The first month of the league season ends with newly promoted Bolton Wanderers, tipped by many to go straight back down this season, as Premier League leaders with three straight wins including a 5–0 away win over bottom placed Leicester City. Everton, Leeds United, Arsenal and Manchester United complete the top five, while Leicester City are joined in the bottom three by Middlesbrough and Southampton. In the race to reach the Premier League, Manchester City, Bradford City, Birmingham City and Norwich City are level on points at the top of Division One, with Wolverhampton Wanderers a point behind them in sixth place.
- 8 September 2001 – Liverpool's slow start to the season continues as Aston Villa beat them 3–1 at Anfield in the Premier League.
- 12 September 2001 – All UEFA Champions League fixtures are cancelled following yesterday's terrorist attacks in the United States of America.
- 13 September 2001 – Cardiff City pay £1.7 million for Stoke City striker Peter Thorne in one of Division Two's biggest transfer fees yet.
- 21 September 2001 – Tottenham Hotspur pay Southampton £8.1 million for defender Dean Richards.
- 27 September 2001 – Michael Owen signs a new four-year contract with Liverpool, with a £70,000 weekly wage making him the most highly paid player in the club's history.
- 29 September 2001 – Tottenham Hotspur surrender a 3–0 home lead over Manchester United in the FA Premier League and end up losing the game 5–3.
- 30 September 2001 – Leicester City sack manager Peter Taylor after 15 months in charge. His team have finished September in bottom place (they were top of the league this time last year before a late season slump dragged them into the bottom half of the table), in the Premier League relegation zone along with Derby County and West Ham United. At the top end of the table, Arsenal lead over Manchester United on goal difference, while Leeds United, Bolton Wanderers and Sunderland complete the top five. Wolverhampton Wanderers lead Division One, with Burnley in second place. West Bromwich Albion, Norwich City, Crystal Palace and Manchester City complete the top six.
- 6 October 2001 – A late equalizer by David Beckham against Greece at Old Trafford gains England automatic qualification for next summer's World Cup. However, the game is marred by a series of hooliganism incidents in Manchester on the day among fans of Manchester United, Manchester City and Stoke City.
- 7 October 2001 – Jim Smith resigns after six years as manager of Derby County and is replaced by his assistant Colin Todd.
- 9 October 2001 – Grimsby Town knock holders Liverpool out of the Worthington Cup 2–1 at the third round stage. This was the first ever victory at Anfield for the Mariners. The winning goal was scored in the last minute of extra time, a stunning long-range strike by Liverpudlian Phil Jevons.
- 10 October 2001 – Dave Bassett is named as Leicester City's new manager, with Brighton & Hove Albion manager Micky Adams being appointed as his assistant.
- 13 October 2001 –
  - – Liverpool boss Gérard Houllier is taken to hospital after complaining about chest pains, during the home draw against Leeds United. He undergoes emergency heart surgery and leaves Phil Thompson in sole control at Anfield, until April.
    - – Blackburn Rovers match their Premier League record win by demolishing West Ham United 7–1 at Ewood Park.
- 17 October 2001 – Just over two weeks after being sacked by Leicester City, Peter Taylor returns to management with Brighton & Hove Albion.
- 18 October 2001 – Leeds United sign midfielder Seth Johnson from Derby County for £7 million.
- 20 October 2001 – Liverpool boost their hopes of a first top division title since 1990 by beating Leicester City 4–1 at Filbert Street, with Robbie Fowler scoring a hat-trick.
- 22 October 2001 – Bertie Mee, the manager of Arsenal's 1971 double-winning team, dies aged 82.
- 27 October 2001 – Aston Villa go top of the Premier League with a 3–2 home win over Bolton Wanderers.
- 31 October 2001 – October finishes with Aston Villa top of the Premier League for the first time in nearly three years. The top five is completed by Leeds United, Arsenal, Liverpool and Manchester United. Leicester City, still with only one win this season, remain bottom of the Premier League with Derby County and Southampton also in the relegation zone. Wolverhampton Wanderers remain top of Division One, with second place now occupied by a Coventry City side who are aiming for an immediate return to the Premier League under new player-manager Roland Nilsson. The playoff zone is occupied by Crystal Palace, Norwich City, Manchester City and Burnley.
- 4 November 2001 – Arsenal suffer a shock 4–2 league home defeat to Charlton Athletic.
- 19 November 2001 – Out of favour striker Paul Kitson scores a hat-trick for West Ham United in a 4–4 draw at Charlton Athletic in the Premier League.
- 23 November 2001 – Ipswich Town, bottom of the Premier League after finishing fifth last season, pay Blackburn Rovers £3 million for striker Marcus Bent.
- 25 November 2001 – Manchester United's dismal run of form continues with a 3–1 defeat at Arsenal.
- 29 November 2001 – Robbie Fowler ends a decade at Liverpool in an £11 million move to Leeds United.
- 30 November 2001 – Liverpool are the month-end Premier League leaders, with Leeds United, Arsenal, Newcastle United and Aston Villa completing the top five. Manchester United, however, occupy a disappointing sixth place – the result of a series of dismal performances in recent weeks. Ipswich Town, who finished fifth in the league last season, are now bottom of the table with just one win so far, while Leicester City and Derby County remain in the drop zone – but only level on goal difference with Southampton. Burnley are the new leaders of Division One, having leapfrogged Wolverhampton Wanderers into second place. Norwich City, Preston North End, West Bromwich Albion and Crystal Palace complete the top six.
- 1 December 2001 – Sir Alex Ferguson writes off Manchester United's chances of a unique fourth successive league title triumph after the latest of several defeats sees them lose 3–0 at home to Chelsea.
- 5 December 2001 – Southampton buy striker Brett Ormerod from Blackpool for £1.75 million.
- 8 December 2001 – Manchester United lose 1–0 at home to West Ham United, completing a dismal run of six defeats from seven Premiership fixtures, leaving them ninth in the league – 11 points behind leaders Liverpool, who have a game in hand.
- 12 December 2001 – After weeks of predominantly dismal results, Manchester United get back to their winning ways with a comprehensive 5–0 win over struggling Derby County.
- 13 December 2001 – Division One promotion chasers Wolverhampton Wanderers sign Rangers striker Kenny Miller for £3 million after a successful loan spell.
- 22 December 2001 – Ipswich Town record only their second league win over the season by beating Tottenham 2–1 at White Hart Lane. Manchester United's revival continues as they beat Southampton 6–1 at Old Trafford.
- 23 December 2001 – Liverpool sign Czech striker Milan Baroš from Baník Ostrava for £3.5 million.
- 26 December 2001 – The highlight of Boxing Day sees Manchester United extend their revival and winning run to four games with a 2–0 win at Everton.
- 29 December 2001 – Andy Cole signs for Blackburn Rovers in an £8million deal after seven years at Manchester United.
- 30 December 2001 – Manchester United make it five consecutive league game wins as they beat Fulham 3–2 at Craven Cottage, with Ryan Giggs scoring twice.
- 31 December 2001 – 2001 draws to a close with Arsenal leading the Premier League on goal difference ahead of Newcastle United, with third placed Leeds United just a point off the top, while fourth placed Liverpool are two points off the top with a game in hand. A resurgent Manchester United are now fifth and just three points off the top, three weeks after being ninth in the league and 11 points off the top. Burnley continue to lead the way in Division One, a point ahead of their nearest rivals Manchester City and Wolverhampton Wanderers. Norwich City, Millwall and Birmingham City complete the top six.
- 1 January – Paul Scholes scores twice as a 3–1 win over Newcastle United extend Manchester United's winning run to six games.
- 4 January/5 January 2002 – The third round of the FA Cup produces some memorable results. Derby County lose 3–1 at home to Division Three strugglers Bristol Rovers, which is yet more trauma for a club who are deep in the Premier League relegation mire. Leeds United, chasing the Premier League title, are knocked out of the FA Cup by Division Two side Cardiff City. Manchester United, meanwhile, beat Aston Villa 3–2 after being 2–0 down with 15 minutes remaining.
- 13 January 2002 – A 3–1 win at Southampton takes Manchester United top of the Premier League on goal difference after seven successive wins lifted them from ninth place.
- 14 January 2002 – Colin Todd is sacked after three months as Derby County manager.
- 19 January 2002 – Manchester United extend their winning run to eight league games with a 2–1 home win over Blackburn.
- 22 January 2002 – Manchester United boost their attack with a £7.5 million move for Uruguayan striker Diego Forlán from Independiente of Argentina.
- 24 January 2002 – John Gregory resigns after four years as manager of Aston Villa.
- 30 January 2002 – John Gregory returns to management six days after leaving Aston Villa when he is named as the new manager of Derby County.
- 31 January 2002 – January ends with top place in the Premier League going to Manchester United, who were ninth in the table less than two months ago. In second place are Arsenal, who are four points behind with two games in hand. Bracketed together, one point behind Arsenal, are Liverpool and Newcastle United. Leeds United complete the top five. A terrible month for Leicester City has left them bottom of the table and eight points adrift of safety, with Derby County just one places and two points above them. Ipswich Town remain in the drop zone despite a recent run of good results, while a mere three points separate the next seven clubs – Bolton Wanderers, Blackburn Rovers, Southampton, Middlesbrough, Everton, West Ham United and Sunderland. The race to get into the Premier League is now led by Manchester City, who are six points ahead of their nearest rivals Wolverhampton Wanderers at the top of Division One. West Bromwich Albion, Millwall, Burnley and Crystal Palace complete the top six.
- 2 February 2002 – Manchester United's 4–1 home win over Sunderland extends their winning run in the league to nine games.
- 4 February 2002 – Newcastle United pay Nottingham Forest £5 million for winger Jermaine Jenas.
- 5 February 2002 – Division One leaders Manchester City pay a club record £5 million for Preston North End striker Jon Macken.
- 24 February 2002 – Blackburn Rovers beat Tottenham Hotspur 2–1 at the Millennium Stadium to win the League Cup for the first time in their history.
- 28 February 2002 – Sir Alex Ferguson changes his mind about retiring as Manchester United manager at the end of the season and signs a new contract which will keep him at the club for at least another three seasons. His team are still top of the Premier League, followed by Arsenal, Liverpool, Newcastle United and Chelsea. Leicester City are sinking deeper into relegation trouble at the other end of the table, while an upturn in fortunes for Derby County is suggesting that John Gregory is their saviour. Blackburn Rovers, meanwhile, have little time to saviour their recent League Cup glory; they are still in the relegation zone. The race to get into the Premier League is similarly tense, with Wolverhampton Wanderers and Manchester City leading the way but facing strong pressure from an improving West Bromwich Albion side. The top six is completed by Millwall, Burnley and Coventry City, while Birmingham City are moving closer to the playoff zone after a slow start to the season.
- 3 March 2002 – Manchester United are held to a surprise 2–2 draw at Derby County, with Malcolm Christie, a self-confessed United supporter, scoring both of Derby's goals.
- 13 March 2002 – Walter Smith is sacked by Everton after nearly four years as manager; they are reportedly interested in recruiting David Moyes from Preston North End as his successor.
- 15 March 2002 – David Moyes is appointed manager of Everton.
- 16 March 2002 – Everton beat Fulham 2–1 at Goodison Park in their first match under the management of David Moyes. Liverpool and Manchester United both win their games today to keep the title challenge fierce. In Division One, meanwhile, Stockport suffered the earliest post-war relegation by any other team after they lost 3-1 away to Wimbledon.
- 17 March 2002 – Arsenal continue to keep up the heat in the title challenge with a 2–1 win at Aston Villa.
- 20 March 2002 – Gérard Houllier returns to Liverpool after a six-month spell out. He watches his side defeat Roma in the Champions League.
- 23 March 2002 – Manchester United's title hopes are dented by a 1–0 home defeat by Middlesbrough.
- 24 March 2002 – Liverpool boost their title hopes when a last gasp goal by Vladimír Šmicer gives them a 1–0 home win over Chelsea.
- 27 March 2002 – Aston Villa sign 6' 7" striker Peter Crouch from Portsmouth for £5million.
- 30 March 2002 – On the day of Queen Elizabeth The Queen Mother's death, Manchester United remain firmly in the hunt for the Premier League title with a thrilling 4–3 win over Leeds United at Elland Road. However, Arsenal and Liverpool both win their games, keeping the title challenge heated.
- 31 March 2002 – The Premier League title race remains in full swing as March draws to a close. Liverpool are now top, Manchester United are second, and Arsenal are third, though Arsenal are two points off the top with two games in hand. The threat from the other top six clubs – Chelsea, Leeds United and Newcastle United – is now virtually non existent. Meanwhile, Leicester City's relegation is looking almost certain, while they and Derby County have been joined in the relegation zone by an Ipswich Town side whose resurgence in late winter appeared to have saved their Premier League status. Manchester City lead the way in Division One, with Wolverhampton Wanderers still second but just three points ahead of nearest rivals West Bromwich Albion. Just three points separate the next six teams – Burnley, Millwall, Birmingham City, Coventry City, Preston North End and Norwich City.
- 1 April 2002 – Arsenal go top of the Premier League with a 1–0 win at Charlton.
- 4 April 2002 – Dave Bassett becomes director of football at Leicester City and he hands managerial duties over to his assistant Micky Adams.
- 5 April 2002 - Manchester City returned to Premiership after only a season out after Wolverhampton Wanderers suffered a 1–0 away defeat at Millwall.
- 6 April 2002 – Leicester City's relegation is confirmed as they lost 1–0 at home to Manchester United, whose crucial win keeps their title challenge alive. Arsenal remain in the lead with a 2–1 home win over Tottenham. A relegation crunch game at the Reebok Stadium sees Bolton beat Ipswich 4–1, with Fredi Bobic scoring a hat-trick. Manchester City secured the Division One title after thrashing Barnsley 5–1 at Maine Road.
- 21 April 2002 – West Bromwich Albion clinch promotion to the FA Premier League with a 2–0 win over Crystal Palace which ends their 16-year exile from the top flight.
- 30 April 2002 – April draws to a close with Arsenal top of the Premier League with Manchester United and Liverpool still in contention, while Leicester City and Derby County have both been relegated. Ipswich Town occupy the last relegation place but will need to win their final game of the season and hope that Sunderland lose theirs if Premier League football is to be played at Portman Road and not the Stadium of Light next season.
- 2 May 2002 – 45 police officers are injured when Millwall fans riot at the end of the Division One playoff fixture against Birmingham City.
- 4 May 2002 – Arsenal clinch the eighth FA Cup victory of their history with a 2–0 win over Chelsea at the Millennium Stadium.
- 8 May 2002 – Arsenal beat defending champions Manchester United 1–0 at Old Trafford to complete their second double in five seasons.
- 10 May 2002 – Marlon King, 22-year-old Gillingham striker, is jailed for 18 months for driving a stolen car.
- 12 May 2002 – On the final day of the Premier League season, Liverpool beat Ipswich Town 5–0 to confirm second place (their first top two finish since 1991). That heavy defeat meant that the Tractor Boys' were relegated and it also resulted in Manchester United being forced to settle for third place – leaving them outside the top two for the first time since 1991 and they also fail to finish winners or runners-up of a major competition for the first time since 1989. Sunderland confirm their survival with a 1–1 home draw against already relegated Derby County. Bottom club Leicester City finish the season with only their fifth league win, beating Tottenham Hotspur 2–1 in their final game at Filbert Street, their home for 111 years, before relocation to the Walkers Stadium.
- 19 May 2002 – Birmingham City win promotion to the Premier League on penalties in the Division One playoff final, while fellow promoted side Manchester City sign Sylvain Distin from Paris Saint-Germain for £4 million.
- 21 May 2002 – The Premier League and Football League officials announce their opposition to FIFA's plans to operate a transfer window system which could see mid-season transfers only permitted to take place during one month of the season. A record eight black players are capped by England in the World Cup warm-up match in South Korea which ends in a 1–1 draw.
- 30 May 2002 – Leicester City sell Robbie Savage to Birmingham City for £1.25 million.
- 2 June 2002 – England open their World Cup campaign with a 1–1 draw against Sweden in Group F.
- 7 June 2002 – A David Beckham penalty gives England a 1–0 win over Argentina in their second World Cup fixture. Manchester City prepare for their Premier League comeback by paying a club record £13 million for Paris Saint-Germain striker Nicolas Anelka, who spent most of last season on loan at Liverpool.
- 12 June 2002 – England secure qualification for the last 16 of the World Cup with a 0–0 draw against Nigeria.
- 15 June 2002 – England defeat Denmark 3–0 in the World Cup second round.
- 21 June 2002 – Despite taking a 23rd-minute lead thanks to Michael Owen, England's World Cup campaign ends in the quarter-finals with a 2–1 defeat to Brazil.
- 22 June 2002 – Newcastle United pay £8.5 million for 19-year-old Portuguese midfielder Hugo Viana from Sporting CP.
- 25 June 2002 – Liverpool sign El Hadji Diouf from Lens for £10 million.

== Promoted teams ==
From Division One to The Premier League:

Manchester City
West Bromwich Albion
Birmingham City

From Division Two to Division One:

Brighton & Hove Albion
Reading
Stoke City

From Division Three to Division Two:

Plymouth Argyle
Luton Town
Mansfield Town
Cheltenham Town

From The Football Conference to Division Three:

Boston United

== Relegated teams ==
From The Premier League to Division One:

Ipswich Town
Derby County
Leicester City

From Division One to Division Two:

Crewe Alexandra
Barnsley
Stockport County

From Division Two to Division Three:

AFC Bournemouth
Bury
Wrexham
Cambridge United

From Division Three to The Football Conference:

Halifax Town

== Women's football ==
=== Women's Premier League ===
==== National Division ====
Pos	Team	Pld	W	D	L	GF	GA	GD	Pts	Qualification or relegation
1	Arsenal (C)	18	16	1	1	60	15	+45	49	Qualification for the UEFA Cup qualifying round
2	Doncaster Belles	18	13	2	3	57	21	+36	41	
3	Charlton Athletic	18	10	1	7	40	24	+16	31	
4	Leeds United	18	7	5	6	36	37	−1	26	
5	Everton	18	8	2	8	30	31	−1	26	
6	Tranmere Rovers	18	7	3	8	31	36	−5	24	
7	Brighton & Hove Albion	18	7	3	8	19	33	−14	24	
8	Southampton Saints	18	5	3	10	19	34	−15	18	
9	Barry Town (R)	18	2	3	13	19	49	−30	9	Relegation to the Southern Division
10	Sunderland (R)	18	1	5	12	15	46	−31	8	Relegation to the Northern Division

Source: FA WPL
(C) Champions; (R) Relegated

==== Northern Division ====
Pos	Team	Pld	W	D	L	GF	GA	GD	Pts	Promotion or relegation
1	Birmingham City (C, P)	20	16	3	1	68	21	+47	51	Promotion to the National Division
2	Wolverhampton Wanderers	20	11	4	5	39	27	+12	37	
3	Oldham Curzon	20	10	6	4	39	22	+17	36	
4	Ilkeston Town	20	9	6	5	43	27	+16	33	
5	Liverpool	20	8	6	6	41	27	+14	30	
6	Bangor City	20	7	8	5	40	35	+5	29	
7	Sheffield Wednesday	20	6	7	7	32	38	−6	25	
8	Aston Villa	20	6	6	8	42	39	+3	24	
9	Garswood Saints	20	4	6	10	21	47	−26	18	
10	Manchester City	20	4	4	12	19	45	−26	16	
11	Coventry City (R)	20	0	2	18	8	64	−56	2	Relegation to the Midland Combination League
12	North Notts (X)	0	0	0	0	0	0	0	0	Withdrew midway through the season. Records expunged.

Source: FA WPL
(C) Champions; (P) Promoted; (R) Relegated; (X) ?

==== Southern Division ====
Pos	Team	Pld	W	D	L	GF	GA	GD	Pts	Promotion or relegation
1	Fulham (C, P)	22	22	0	0	234	6	+228	66	Promotion to the National Division
2	Bristol Rovers	22	14	2	6	72	35	+37	44	
3	Millwall Lionesses	22	14	1	7	55	55	0	43	
4	Chelsea	22	13	2	7	59	51	+8	41	
5	Langford	22	12	1	9	53	46	+7	37	
6	Wimbledon	22	11	3	8	41	55	−14	36	
7	Ipswich Town	22	8	4	10	43	52	−9	28	
8	Barking	22	7	2	13	40	79	−39	23	
9	Newport County	22	6	3	13	37	60	−23	21	
10	Barnet	22	5	6	11	27	75	−48	21	
11	Queens Park Rangers (R)	22	3	5	14	19	60	−41	14	Relegation to the South East Combination League
12	Berkhamsted Town (R)	22	1	3	18	10	116	−106	6	Relegation to the South East Combination League

Source: WPL
(C) Champions; (P) Promoted; (R) Relegated

=== FA Women's Cup ===
==== Final ====
6 May 2002
13:00 BST

Doncaster Belles	1–2	Fulham
Handley 61'	FA report BBC report	Yankey 55'; Chapman 60'

Selhurst Park, London
Attendance: 10,124
Referee: Eddie Evans (Manchester)

== Transfer deals ==
1 August 2001

- Christian Ziege from Liverpool to Tottenham Hotspur, £4m

2 August 2001

- John Hartson from Coventry City to Celtic, £6.5m

3 August 2001

- Fabrizio Ravanelli from Lazio to Derby County, free

9 August 2001

- Jon Harley from Chelsea to Fulham, £3.5m
- Lee Hughes from West Bromwich Albion to Coventry City, £5m

10 August 2001

- Laurent Robert from Paris Saint-Germain to Newcastle United, £10.5m
- Edwin van der Sar from Juventus to Fulham, £7m
- Boudewijn Zenden from Barcelona to Chelsea, £7.5m

14 August 2001

- Steed Malbranque from Lyon to Fulham, £5m

16 August 2001

- Kasey Keller from Rayo Vallecano to Tottenham Hotspur, free

24 August 2001

- Boško Balaban from Dinamo Zagreb to Aston Villa, £6m

31 August 2001

- Jerzy Dudek from Feyenoord to Liverpool, £4.85m
- Don Hutchison from Sunderland to West Ham United, £5m
- Chris Kirkland from Coventry City to Liverpool, £6m

3 September 2001

- Laurent Blanc from Inter Milan to Manchester United, free
- Steve Marlet from Lyon to Fulham, £13.5m

14 September 2001

- Tomáš Řepka from Fiorentina to West Ham United, £5.5m

24 September 2001

- Dean Richards from Southampton to Tottenham Hotspur, £8.1m

19 October 2001

- Seth Johnson from Derby County to Leeds United, £7m

30 November 2001

- Robbie Fowler from Liverpool to Leeds United, £11m

7 December 2001

- Claudio Reyna from Rangers to Sunderland, £4.5m

24 December 2001

- Milan Baroš from Baník Ostrava to Liverpool

29 December 2001

- Andy Cole from Manchester United to Blackburn Rovers, £7.5m

23 January 2002

- Diego Forlán from Independiente to Manchester United, £7.5m

30 January 2002

- Abel Xavier from Everton to Liverpool, £800,000

8 February 2002

- Jermaine Jenas from Nottingham Forest to Newcastle United, £5m

18 February 2002

- Kolo Touré from ASEC Mimosas to Arsenal, Undisclosed

6 March 2002

- Jon Macken from Preston North End to Manchester City, £4m

18 March 2002

- Paul Gascoigne from Everton to Burnley, free

28 March 2002

- Peter Crouch from Portsmouth to Aston Villa, £4m

18 April 2002

- Jamie Redknapp from Liverpool to Tottenham Hotspur, free

For subsequent transfer deals see 2002–03 in English football.

== Managerial changes ==
August

- 3 August 2001 – Roy Evans and Neil Ruddock take over at Swindon Town, replacing Andy King (sacked 1 August)

September

- 13 September – Colin Addison takes over at Swansea City, replacing John Hollins (sacked 12 September)

October

- 8 October – Denis Smith takes over at Wrexham, replacing Brian Flynn
- 8 October – Colin Todd takes over at Derby County, replacing Jim Smith (resigned same day)
- 10 October – Dave Bassett takes over at Leicester City, replacing Peter Taylor (sacked 30 September)
- 10 October – Coach Gary Brazil takes over at Notts County, replacing Jocky Scott (sacked 10 October)
- 12 October – Alan Little takes over at Halifax Town, replacing Paul Bracewell (resigned 30 August)
- 15 October – Paul Brush takes over at Leyton Orient, replacing Tommy Taylor
- 16 October – Roland Nilsson takes over at Coventry City, replacing Gordon Strachan (resigned 10 September)
- 17 October – Peter Taylor takes over at Brighton & Hove Albion
- 22 October – Gordon Strachan takes over at Southampton, replacing Stuart Gray (sacked 21 October)
- 22 October – Caretaker manager Rob Newman takes over at Southend United, replacing David Webb (resigned 9 October)
- 25 October – Kevin Broadhurst takes over at Northampton Town, replacing Kevin Wilson (sacked 26 September)
- 25 October – Tommy Taylor takes over at Darlington until the end of the season, replacing Gary Bennett (resigned 24 October)
- 30 October – John Cornforth takes over at Exeter City, replacing Noel Blake (sacked 23 September)

November

- 6 November – Carlton Palmer takes over at Stockport County, replacing Andy Kilner (sacked 29 October)
- 7 November – Mick Wadsworth takes over at Oldham Athletic
- 8 November – David Moss takes over at Macclesfield Town
- 9 November – Steve Parkin takes over at Barnsley, replacing Nigel Spackman (sacked 25 October)
- 14 November – Terry Yorath takes over at Sheffield Wednesday, replacing Peter Shreeves (left 17 October)
- 30 November – Trevor Francis takes over at Crystal Palace, replacing Steve Bruce (resigned 2 November)
- 30 November – Ian Atkins takes over at Oxford United, replacing Mark Wright (resigned)

December

- 11 December – John Hollins takes over at Rochdale, replacing Steve Parkin
- 12 December – Steve Bruce takes over at Birmingham City, replacing Trevor Francis (left 15 October)
- 22 December – Andy King is reappointed at Swindon Town, replacing Roy Evans (resigned as Director of Football 20 December)
- 28 December – Garry Thompson takes over at Bristol Rovers for the second time, replacing Gerry Francis (resigned 24 December)
- 28 December – Paul Groves takes over at Grimsby Town, replacing Lennie Lawrence (resigned)

January

- 1 January – Nicky Law takes over at Bradford City, replacing Jim Jefferies (resigned 24 December)
- 6 January – John Taylor takes over at Cambridge United, replacing John Beck (resigned 22 November)
- 7 January – Billy Dearden takes over at Notts County, replacing Gary Brazil (steps back down to coach)
- 9 January – Assistant manager Stuart Watkiss takes over at Mansfield Town, replacing Billy Dearden (resigned 6 January)
- 23 January – Colin Lee takes over at Walsall, replacing Ray Graydon (sacked 22 January)
- 30 January – John Gregory takes over at Derby County, replacing Colin Todd (sacked 14 January after just 98 days as manager)

February

- 5 February – Non-executive director Graham Taylor takes over as manager at Aston Villa, replacing John Gregory (resigned 24 January)
- 18 February – Director of Football Lennie Lawrence takes over as manager at Cardiff City, replacing Alan Cork (resigned)
- 22 February – Dave Rushbury takes over at Chesterfield, replacing Nicky Law (resigned 1 January)

March

- 14 March – David Moyes takes over at Everton, replacing Walter Smith (left 12 March)
- 25 March – Director of Football Harry Redknapp takes over at Portsmouth, replacing Graham Rix (sacked)

April

- 4 April – Micky Adams takes over at Leicester City, replacing Dave Bassett (becomes Director of Football)
- 4 April – Jan Mølby takes over at Hull City, replacing Brian Little (left 27 February)
- 24 April – Gary McAllister takes over at Coventry City, replacing Roland Nilsson (sacked 16 April)
- 25 April – Ray Graydon takes over at Bristol Rovers, replacing Garry Thompson (sacked 9 April)
- 25 April – Ian Britton takes over at Kidderminster Harriers, replacing Jan Molby (resigned 4 April)
- 29 April – Craig Brown takes over at Preston North End, replacing David Moyes (left 14 March)

May

- 5 May – Caretaker Keith Alexander takes over at Lincoln City, replacing Alan Buckley (left 25 April)
- 9 May – Leroy Rosenior takes over at Torquay United, replacing Roy McFarland (sacked 23 April)
- 27 May – Steve Cotterill takes over at Stoke City, replacing Gudjon Thordarson (sacked 16 May)
- 29 May – Paul Simpson takes over at Rochdale, replacing John Hollins (sacked 13 May)
- 30 May – Coach Graham Allner takes over at Cheltenham Town, replacing Steve Cotterill (resigned 16 May)
- 31 May – Coach Iain Dowie takes over at Oldham Athletic, replacing Mick Wadsworth (sacked)

June

- June – Stuart Murdoch takes over at Wimbledon, replacing Terry Burton (left 25 April)
- 28 June – Assistant Wally Downes takes over at Brentford, replacing Steve Coppell (resigned 6 June)

July

- 1 July – Mick Wadsworth takes over at Huddersfield Town, replacing Lou Macari
- 11 July – Ray Lewington takes over at Watford, replacing Gianluca Vialli
- July – Chris Wilder takes over at Halifax Town, replacing caretaker Neil Redfearn (resigned 23 May), who replaced Alan Little (left 8 April)
- 15 July – Youth director Martin Hinshelwood takes over at Brighton & Hove Albion, replacing Peter Taylor (resigned 29 April)
- July – Terry Venables takes over at Leeds United, replacing David O'Leary (sacked 27 June)

== Famous debutants ==
- Future England Striker Darren Bent, 17, appears for Ipswich Town in their 3–1 victory away at Helsingborgs IF in the UEFA Cup 2nd Round in November 2001.
- Future England winger Stewart Downing, 17, appears for Middlesbrough in their 1–0 defeat by Ipswich Town in April 2002.

== Retirements ==
9 November 2001: Tony Ford, 42-year-old midfielder with one of the highest appearance records of any postwar English footballer, retires from playing after leaving Rochdale and following their manager Steve Parkin to Barnsley as his assistant and deciding that he was not capable of playing second-tier football.

19 February 2002: Roberto Di Matteo, 31-year-old midfielder who was Chelsea's record signing for £4.9 million in 1996 and scored for them in FA Cup final wins in 1997 and 2000, retires after 17 months out of action having failed to recover from a broken leg suffered in a UEFA Cup game in September 2000.

21 April 2002: Stuart Pearce, 40-year-old left back who had been in league football since 1983 and was an England international for more than a decade until his last appearance in 2000, retires having helped Manchester City win promotion to the Premier League as Division One champions. His final game was against Portsmouth at Maine Road, in which he missed a penalty that if scored would have been the 100th goal of his professional career that had also seen him play for Coventry City, Nottingham Forest, Newcastle United and West Ham United.

10 May 2002: Lee Dixon, 38-year-old right back who signed for Arsenal in January 1988 and played more than 600 games for them, retires after winning his second double in five seasons (and his fourth league title) for the North London club.

11 May 2002: Matthew Le Tissier, 33-year-old midfielder who spent his entire professional career at Southampton since 1986, retires after scoring 162 goals for them but never managing to win a major trophy or play in a European competition, though he did manage several England appearances in the 1990s.

== Deaths ==
- 3 July 2001: Billy Liddell, 79, legendary Liverpool winger who scored 228 goals in all competitions at the club between 1938 and 1961, although the only major trophy he won with them was the league title in 1947. He was capped 28 times by Scotland. During the final years of his life, he was ill with Parkinson's disease and Alzheimer's disease.
- 5 August 2001: Aaron Flahavan, 25, Portsmouth goalkeeper who had played 93 first-team games since 1996, died in a car crash in west Hampshire just before the start of the season.
- 8 August 2001: Paul Vaessen, 39, former Arsenal striker whose career was cut short by injury. Most famous for scoring the goal that earned Arsenal a place in the 1980 Cup Winners' Cup final.
- 19 August 2001: Les Sealey, 43, who kept goal for Manchester United in their 1990 FA Cup and 1991 Cup Winners Cup triumphs, died of a heart attack in north London. He had also played for Coventry City, Luton Town, Aston Villa, Birmingham City (on loan), Blackpool and West Ham United, and at the time of his death had been working for West Ham United as goalkeeping coach.
- 20 August 2001: Tom Staniforth, 20, Sheffield Wednesday defender, collapsed and died on a night out in York. He was a promising young defender for the club and a son of former footballer Gordon Staniforth.
- 1 September 2001: Brian Moore, 69, former BBC Radio and ITV commentator, died of cancer three years after retiring from football commentary.
- 13 September 2001: Alex Scott, 63, played 149 league games as a right-winger for Everton after signing from Rangers in February 1963, helping them win the league title that spring and the FA Cup three years later. He returned to his native Scotland in 1967 and was capped 16 times for the national side, scoring five goals.
- 17 September 2001: Ray Gill, 76, the record Football League appearance holder for Chester City.
- 22 October 2001: Bertie Mee, 80, Arsenal double-winning manager 1970–71, died after a long illness. He also guided Arsenal to European Fairs Cup glory, achieved one year before the double triumph. From 1976 to 1986 he was assistant manager to Graham Taylor at Watford, and remained at the club as a director until his retirement in 1991.
- 23 October 2001: Ken Aston, 86, World Cup referee who created the red and yellow cards system.
- 2 January 2002: Charlie Mitten, 80, was a left winger in Manchester United's FA Cup winning team of 1948, before transferring to Club Santa Fe, Colombia, in 1951, and then returning to England to play for Fulham before retiring as a player in 1956. He later managed Mansfield Town and non-league Altrincham.
- 19 January 2002: Jeff Astle, 59, West Bromwich Albion and England striker, died suddenly in Burton-upon-Trent. He is best remembered for his appearances on the TV series Fantasy Football and for scoring Albion's winning goal against Everton in the 1968 FA Cup final.
- 4 February 2002: John Bromley, 68, journalist & TV executive at ITV who ended BBC's monopoly of sports programming with World of Sport, he is also credited with creating the hit football programme Saint and Greavsie with Ian St. John & Jimmy Greaves.
- 16 February 2002: Sir Walter Winterbottom, 88, the first England manager. Managed England from 1946 until 1962, when he made way for Alf Ramsey.
- 26 March 2002: Kenneth Wolstenholme, 81, BBC television commentator, who famously commentated England's 1966 World Cup triumph and is best remembered for saying 'They think it's all over ... it is now' when Geoff Hurst scored England's last-minute winner.
- 9 April 2002: Roy Dwight, 69, played on the right wing for Nottingham Forest in their 1959 FA Cup triumph, but was stretchered off in the final against Luton Town with a broken leg. He also played for Fulham and later Coventry City and Millwall in a career which yielded 85 league goals in 154 games. He was the uncle of pop legend and Watford chairman Elton John.
- 16 April 2002: Billy Ayre, 49, former Halifax, Blackpool, Scarborough, Southport and Cardiff City manager, died after a long battle with cancer of the lymph node. He guided Blackpool to two successive Wembley play-off finals, in 1990–91 and 1991–92.
- 21 May 2002: Roy Paul, 82, played 270 league games in defence for Manchester City during the 1950s after signing from Swansea, and collected an FA Cup winner's medal in 1956. He was capped 33 times by Wales.
- 28 May 2002: Wimbledon FC, 114, played 1,052 Football League games between 1977 and 2002 and won the FA Cup in 1988.
