= Elmes =

Elmes is a surname. Notable people with the surname include:

- Cedric Elmes (1909–1995), New Zealand cricketer
- Damien Elmes, Australian programmer and creator of Anki
- Frederick Elmes (born 1946), American cinematographer
- Glen Elmes (born 1955), Australian politician
- Guy Elmes (1920–1998), British screenwriter
- Harvey Lonsdale Elmes (1814–1847), English architect
- James Elmes (1782–1862), English architect, civil engineer and writer on the arts
- Mary Elmes (1908–2002), Irish businesswoman
- Oliver Elmes, British graphic designer
- Tim Elmes (born 1962), English former professional footballer
- Vic Elmes (born 1947), English guitarists
