= 2002–03 Football League First Division =

Football League First Division
- Season: 2002–03
- Champions: Portsmouth (3rd divisional title)
- Promoted: Portsmouth; Leicester City; Wolverhampton Wanderers
- Relegated: Sheffield Wednesday; Brighton & Hove Albion; Grimsby Town
- Matches: 557
- Goals: 1,512 (2.71 per match)
- Top goalscorer: Svetoslav Todorov (26 goals)
- Biggest home win: Nottm Forest 6–0 Stoke, Wolves 6–0 Gillingham
- Biggest away win: Millwall 0–6 Rotherham
- Highest scoring: Grimsby 6–5 Burnley, Burnley 4–7 Watford
- Longest winning run: 7 games Portsmouth
- Longest unbeaten run: 15 games Leicester City
- Longest winless run: 16 games Stoke City
- Longest losing run: 12 games Brighton & Hove Albion
- Average attendance: 15,599

The 2002–03 Football League First Division (referred to as the Nationwide First Division for sponsorship reasons) was the eleventh season of the league under its current format as the second tier of English football.

Portsmouth won the division to return to the Premier League after a fifteen-year absence. In Harry Redknapp's first full season in charge the team secured the title on 27 April, with a victory over Rotherham, having been promoted with four games to spare by defeating Burnley.

Leicester City were promoted at the first attempt following their relegation. Their promotion was contentious as they entered administration during the season due to debts in excess of £50 million stemming from their loss of Premier League income and major investment in a new stadium, but were able to write-off these entirely when a new consortium took control and therefore avoided having to sell off players. Following this incident, the Football League would introduce rules that penalised any club entering administration with a ten-point points deduction; although Leicester would still have finished in second place had been this been applied.

Wolverhampton Wanderers won the play-offs to reach the modern-day Premiership for the first time after a 3–0 win in the play-off final against a Sheffield United team which had reached the semi-finals of both domestic cup competitions. This marked a return to top-flight football for Wolves after a nineteen-year exodus that had seen them fall as low as the fourth tier. Also leaving the division were Sheffield Wednesday, Brighton & Hove Albion and Grimsby Town, who were all relegated.

== Team changes from previous season ==
=== From the First Division ===
Promoted to the Premiership:

- Manchester City
- West Bromwich Albion
- Birmingham City

Relegated to the Second Division:

- Crewe Alexandra
- Barnsley
- Stockport County

=== To the First Division ===
Relegated from the Premiership:

- Leicester City
- Ipswich Town
- Derby County

Promoted from the Second Division:

- Brighton & Hove Albion
- Reading
- Stoke City

== Team overview ==
=== Stadia and locations ===
Locations of the 2002–03 First Division clubs

Team	Location	Stadium	Capacity
Bradford City	Bradford	Bradford & Bingley Stadium	25,136
Burnley	Burnley	Turf Moor	22,546
Brighton & Hove Albion	Brighton	Withdean Stadium	8,850
Coventry City	Coventry	Highfield Road	23,489
Crystal Palace	London	Selhurst Park	26,309
Derby County	Derby	Pride Park	33,597
Gillingham	Gillingham	Priestfield Stadium	11,582
Grimsby Town	Cleethorpes	Blundell Park	10,033
Ipswich Town	Ipswich	Portman Road	30,311
Leicester City	Leicester	Walkers Stadium	32,500
Millwall	London	The New Den	20,146
Nottingham Forest	Nottingham	City Ground	30,576
Norwich City	Norwich	Carrow Road	26,018
Portsmouth	Portsmouth	Fratton Park	20,224
Preston North End	Preston	Deepdale	23,408
Reading	Reading	Madejski Stadium	24,161
Rotherham United	Rotherham	Millmoor	8,300
Sheffield United	Sheffield	Bramall Lane	32,702
Sheffield Wednesday	Sheffield	Hillsborough	39,812
Stoke City	Stoke	Britannia Stadium	27,740
Walsall	Walsall	Bescot Stadium	11,300
Watford	Watford	Vicarage Road	17,504
Wimbledon	London	Selhurst Park^{1}	26,309
Wolverhampton Wanderers	Wolverhampton	Molineux	27,828

- Note 1: Wimbledon rented the use of Crystal Palace's Selhurst Park home.

=== Personnel and sponsoring ===
Team	Manager	Kit maker	Sponsor
Bradford City	(England) Nicky Law	BCAFC	JCT600
Burnley	(England) Stan Ternent	TFG Sports	Lanway
Brighton & Hove Albion	(England) Martin Hinshelwood	Erreà	Skint Records
Coventry City	(Scotland) Gary McAllister	CCFC	Subaru
Crystal Palace	(England) Trevor Francis	Le Coq Sportif	Churchill Insurance
Derby County	(England) John Gregory	Erreà	Pedigree
Gillingham	(England) Andy Hessenthaler	Gills Leisure	SeaFrance
Grimsby Town	(England) Paul Groves	Avec	Dixon
Ipswich Town	(Scotland) George Burley	Punch	TXU Energi
Leicester City	(England) Micky Adams	Le Coq Sportif	LG
Millwall	(Scotland) Mark McGhee	Strikeforce	24seven
Nottingham Forest	(England) Paul Hart	Umbro	Pinnacle Insurance
Norwich City	(Northern Ireland) Nigel Worthington	Xara	Digital Phone Company
Portsmouth	(England) Harry Redknapp	Pompey Sport	Ty
Preston North End	(Scotland) Craig Brown	Voi	NewReg.com
Reading	(England) Alan Pardew	Kit@	Westcoast
Rotherham United	(England) Ronnie Moore	Bodyline	T-Mobile
Sheffield United	(England) Neil Warnock	Le Coq Sportif	Desun
Sheffield Wednesday	(Wales) Terry Yorath	Diadora	Chupa Chups
Stoke City	(England) Steve Cotterill	Le Coq Sportif	Britannia
Walsall	(England) Colin Lee	Xara	Banks's
Watford	(England) Ray Lewington	Kit@	Toshiba
Wimbledon	(England) Stuart Murdoch	Patrick	Go MK
Wolverhampton Wanderers	(England) Dave Jones	Admiral	Doritos

==== Managerial changes ====
Team	Outgoing manager	Manner of departure	Date of vacancy	Position in table	Replaced by	Date of appointment
Brighton & Hove Albion	(England) Peter Taylor	Resigned	29 April 2002	Off season	(England) Martin Hinshelwood	15 July 2002
Brighton & Hove Albion	(England) Martin Hinshelwood	Moved to director of football position	7 October 2002	24th	(England) Steve Coppell	7 October 2002
Stoke City	(England) Steve Cotterill	Resigned to become assistant manager at Sunderland	10 October 2002	15th	(Wales) Tony Pulis	1 November 2002
Ipswich Town	(Scotland) George Burley	Sacked	11 October 2002	19th	(England) Joe Royle	28 October 2002
Sheffield Wednesday	(Wales) Terry Yorath	Resigned	31 October 2002	22nd	(England) Chris Turner	7 November 2002
Crystal Palace	(England) Trevor Francis	Mutual consent	18 April 2003	11th	(England) Steve Kember	23 May 2003
Derby County	(England) John Gregory	Sacked	9 May 2003^{2}	18th (end of season)	(Scotland) George Burley	5 June 2003^{3}

- Note 2: Although Gregory was dismissed on this date, he had already been suspended from his post on 21 March after "serious allegations" were made against him.
- Note 3: Burley was initially appointed on 31 March as interim manager following John Gregory's suspension.

== League table ==
Pos	Team	Pld	W	D	L	GF	GA	GD	Pts	Promotion or relegation
1	Portsmouth (C, P)	46	29	11	6	97	45	+52	98	Promotion to 2003–04 FA Premier League
2	Leicester City (P)	46	26	14	6	73	40	+33	92	Promotion to 2003–04 FA Premier League
3	Sheffield United	46	23	11	12	72	52	+20	80	Qualification for First Division Playoffs
4	Reading	46	25	4	17	61	46	+15	79	Qualification for First Division Playoffs
5	Wolverhampton Wanderers (O, P)	46	20	16	10	81	44	+37	76	Qualification for First Division Playoffs
6	Nottingham Forest	46	20	14	12	82	50	+32	74	Qualification for First Division Playoffs
7	Ipswich Town	46	19	13	14	80	64	+16	70	
8	Norwich City	46	19	12	15	60	49	+11	69	
9	Millwall	46	19	9	18	59	69	−10	66	
10	Wimbledon	46	18	11	17	76	73	+3	65	
11	Gillingham	46	16	14	16	56	65	−9	62	
12	Preston North End	46	16	13	17	68	70	−2	61	
13	Watford	46	17	9	20	54	70	−16	60	
14	Crystal Palace	46	14	17	15	59	52	+7	59	
15	Rotherham United	46	15	14	17	62	62	0	59	
16	Burnley	46	15	10	21	65	89	−24	55	
17	Walsall	46	15	9	22	57	69	−12	54	
18	Derby County	46	15	7	24	55	74	−19	52	
19	Bradford City	46	14	10	22	51	73	−22	52	
20	Coventry City	46	12	14	20	46	62	−16	50	
21	Stoke City	46	12	14	20	45	69	−24	50	
22	Sheffield Wednesday (R)	46	10	16	20	56	73	−17	46	Relegation to 2003–04 Second Division
23	Brighton & Hove Albion (R)	46	11	12	23	49	67	−18	45	Relegation to 2003–04 Second Division
24	Grimsby Town (R)	46	9	12	25	48	85	−37	39	Relegation to 2003–04 Second Division

Updated to match(es) played on 11 May 2003. Source: Soccerway
Rules for classification: 1) points; 2) goal difference; 3) number of goals scored.
(C) Champions; (O) Play-off winners; (P) Promoted; (R) Relegated

== Play-offs ==
Semi-finals
3	Sheffield United	1	4	5
6	Nottingham Forest	1	3	4
4	Reading	1	0	1
5	Wolverhampton Wanderers	2	1	3

Final
3	Sheffield United	0
5	Wolverhampton Wanderers	3

== Awards ==
Month	Manager of the Month		Notes
Month	Manager	Club	Notes
August	(England) Harry Redknapp	Portsmouth	
September	(England) Micky Adams	Leicester City	
October	(England) Ray Lewington	Watford	
November	(England) Alan Pardew	Reading	
December	(Scotland) Gary McAllister	Coventry City	
January	(England) Neil Warnock	Sheffield United	
February	(England) Alan Pardew	Reading	
March	(England) Joe Royle	Ipswich Town	
April	(Scotland) Mark McGhee	Millwall	

PFA Team of the Year

Pos.	Player	Club
GK	(Trinidad and Tobago) Shaka Hislop	Portsmouth
DF	(Republic of Ireland) Denis Irwin	Wolverhampton Wanderers
DF	(England) Joleon Lescott	Wolverhampton Wanderers
DF	(England) Michael Dawson	Nottingham Forest
DF	(England) Matthew Taylor	Portsmouth
MF	(Turkey) Muzzy Izzet	Leicester City
MF	(England) Michael Brown	Sheffield United
MF	(England) Paul Merson	Portsmouth
MF	(England) Michael Tonge	Sheffield United
FW	(Jamaica) David Johnson	Nottingham Forest
FW	(Scotland) Paul Dickov	Leicester City

== Attendances ==
#	Club	Average
1	Leicester City	29,231
2	Wolverhampton Wanderers	25,745
3	Derby County	25,470
4	Ipswich Town	25,455
5	Nottingham Forest	24,437
6	Norwich City	20,353
7	Sheffield Wednesday	20,327
8	Portsmouth	18,934
9	Sheffield United	18,069
10	Crystal Palace	16,867
11	Reading	16,011
12	Coventry City	14,813
13	Stoke City	14,588
14	Burnley	13,977
15	Preston North End	13,853
16	Watford	13,405
17	Bradford City	12,501
18	Millwall	8,512
19	Gillingham	8,078
20	Rotherham United	7,522
21	Walsall	6,978
22	Brighton & Hove Albion	6,651
23	Grimsby Town	5,884
24	MK Dons	2,786
