= Wally Hinshelwood =

English footballer (1929–2018)

Personal information
- Full name: Walter Alexander Alan Hinshelwood
- Date of birth: 27 October 1929
- Place of birth: Lambeth, England
- Date of death: 26 November 2018 (aged 89)
- Position: Outside right

Senior career*
Years	Team	Apps	(Gls)
1947–1951	Fulham	17	(1)
1951	Chelsea	12	(1)
1951–1952	Fulham	2	(0)
1952–1956	Reading	135	(31)
1956–1960	Bristol City	148	(16)
1960–1961	Millwall	19	(1)
1961–1962	Newport County	3	(0)
Total		336	(50)
- * Club domestic league appearances and goals

Walter Hinshelwood (27 October 1929 – 26 November 2018) was an English footballer who was active in the 1950s. His position on the pitch was outside-right.

== Career ==
Hinshelwood began his career at Fulham, where he received little playing time. In January 1951, he was transferred to Chelsea, but returned to Fulham within four months.

In 1952, Hinshelwood joined Reading, where he became a first-team regular. He was selected to play for the Third Division South representative side in 1954–55. Four years later, he moved to Bristol City where he played another four years before finishing his career with short spells at Millwall and Newport County.

== Personal life ==
Wally Hinshelwood is also the patriarch of the Hinshelwood football family. His sons Martin and Paul both went on to become professional footballers at Crystal Palace. Martin had to retire early because of injury, and is director of football at Brighton & Hove Albion, while Paul became an England under-21 international and played more than 300 games for Palace. Wally's grandsons Danny, Adam and Paul Jr., and great-grandson Jack have also played professional football.
