= 1969–70 Sussex County Football League =

The 1969–70 Sussex County Football League season was the 45th in the history of Sussex County Football League a football competition in England.

== Division One ==
Sussex County Football League Division One
- Season: 1969–70
- Champions: Haywards Heath
- Relegated: Bognor Regis Town; Wadhurst
- Matches played: 240
- Goals scored: 819 (3.41 per match)

Division One featured 14 clubs which competed in the division last season, along with two new clubs, promoted from Division Two:

- Ringmer
- Three Bridges

Also, Bexhill Town Athletic changed name to Bexhill Town after parting ways with Bexhill Amateur Athletic Club.

=== League table ===
Pos	Team	Pld	W	D	L	GF	GA	GR	Pts	Qualification or relegation
1	Haywards Heath	30	21	5	4	65	25	2.600	47	
2	Chichester City	30	19	4	7	74	35	2.114	42	
3	Southwick	30	16	8	6	55	32	1.719	40	
4	Littlehampton Town	30	17	6	7	61	47	1.298	40	
5	Rye United	30	14	8	8	58	40	1.450	36	
6	Ringmer	30	14	7	9	58	40	1.450	35	
7	East Grinstead	30	10	12	8	47	40	1.175	32	
8	Bexhill Town	30	12	6	12	51	42	1.214	30	
9	Horsham YMCA	30	10	8	12	44	51	0.863	28	
10	Sidley United	30	10	7	13	44	42	1.048	27	
11	Whitehawk	30	9	7	14	48	56	0.857	25	
12	Seaford Town	30	7	11	12	47	70	0.671	25	
13	Arundel	30	8	7	15	62	61	1.016	23	
14	Three Bridges	30	9	5	16	45	62	0.726	23	
15	Bognor Regis Town	30	7	7	16	34	52	0.654	21	Relegated to Division Two
16	Wadhurst	30	1	4	25	26	124	0.210	6	Relegated to Division Two

Source: nonleaguematters
Rules for classification: 1) points; 2) goal ratio.

== Division Two ==
Sussex County Football League Division Two
- Season: 1970–71
- Champions: Lancing
- Promoted: Lancing; APV Athletic
- Matches played: 210
- Goals scored: 740 (3.52 per match)

Division Two featured twelve clubs which competed in the division last season, along with three new clubs:

- Peacehaven & Telscombe, joined from the Brighton, Hove & District League
- Selsey, relegated from Division One
- Wigmore Athletic, relegated from Division One

Also, Burgess Hill changed name to Burgess Hill Town.

=== League table ===
Pos	Team	Pld	W	D	L	GF	GA	GR	Pts	Qualification or relegation
1	Lancing	28	19	4	5	71	24	2.958	42	Promoted to Division One
2	APV Athletic	28	18	6	4	61	32	1.906	42	Promoted to Division One
3	Burgess Hill Town	28	15	10	3	61	29	2.103	40	
4	Newhaven	28	14	5	9	56	37	1.514	33	
5	Wigmore Athletic	28	12	8	8	53	53	1.000	32	
6	Selsey	28	12	6	10	57	58	0.983	30	
7	Wick	28	11	5	12	48	46	1.043	27	
8	Hastings & St Leonards	28	11	4	13	49	57	0.860	26	
9	Peacehaven & Telscombe	28	11	3	14	41	54	0.759	25	
10	Shoreham	28	10	5	13	40	53	0.755	25	
11	Steyning	28	11	2	15	48	50	0.960	24	
12	Hastings Rangers	28	8	6	14	32	57	0.561	22	
13	Ferring	28	6	8	14	43	44	0.977	20	
14	Old Varndeanians	28	7	2	19	42	65	0.646	16	
15	Portfield	28	5	6	17	38	81	0.469	16	

Source: nonleaguematters
Rules for classification: 1) points; 2) goal ratio.
