= Bill Miller (footballer, born 1890) =

English footballer

Personal information
- Full name: William Miller
- Date of birth: 1890
- Place of birth: Alnwick, England
- Position: Inside forward

Senior career*
Years	Team	Apps	(Gls)
- Ryhope Villa
191?–1921	Brighton & Hove Albion	103	(51)
–	Hove		
–	Redhill		
–	Shoreham		
- * Club domestic league appearances and goals

William Miller (1890 – after 1924) was an English professional footballer who made seven appearances in the English Football League for Brighton & Hove Albion. Before Brighton's admission to the Football League, Miller scored 40 goals from 84 games in the Southern League and 11 goals from 12 games in the Southern Alliance, and was their top scorer in the 1913–14 season with 20 goals in all competitions. He was born in Alnwick, Northumberland, and played as an inside forward.
