= 1970–71 Sussex County Football League =

The 1970–71 Sussex County Football League season was the 46th in the history of Sussex County Football League a football competition in England.

== Division One ==
Sussex County Football League Division One
- Season: 1970–71
- Champions: Ringmer
- Relegated: Sidley United; Seaford Town
- Matches played: 240
- Goals scored: 820 (3.42 per match)

Division One featured 14 clubs which competed in the division last season, along with two new clubs, promoted from Division Two:

- APV Athletic
- Lancing

=== League table ===
Pos	Team	Pld	W	D	L	GF	GA	GR	Pts	Qualification or relegation
1	Ringmer	30	21	3	6	73	29	2.517	45	
2	Southwick	30	20	5	5	64	37	1.730	45	
3	Haywards Heath	30	16	6	8	60	39	1.538	38	
4	Littlehampton Town	30	14	8	8	61	49	1.245	36	
5	Chichester City	30	15	4	11	70	48	1.458	34	
6	Arundel	30	16	2	12	75	66	1.136	34	
7	East Grinstead	30	15	4	11	62	60	1.033	34	
8	Bexhill Town	30	14	4	12	45	34	1.324	32	
9	Whitehawk	30	12	6	12	58	52	1.115	30	
10	Rye United	30	9	9	12	41	50	0.820	27	
11	Lancing	30	10	4	16	31	47	0.660	24	
12	APV Athletic	30	9	4	17	40	62	0.645	22	
13	Horsham YMCA	30	7	8	15	44	63	0.698	21 (Note: Horsham YMCA were deducted one point.)	
14	Three Bridges	30	8	4	18	33	55	0.600	20	
15	Sidley United	30	7	5	18	28	58	0.483	19	Relegated to Division Two
16	Seaford Town	30	7	4	19	35	71	0.493	18	Relegated to Division Two

Source: nonleaguematters
Rules for classification: 1) points; 2) goal ratio.

== Division Two ==
Sussex County Football League Division Two
- Season: 1970–71
- Champions: Bognor Regis Town
- Promoted: Bognor Regis Town; Burgess Hill Town
- Matches played: 240
- Goals scored: 890 (3.71 per match)

Division Two featured 13 clubs which competed in the division last season, along with three new clubs:

- Bognor Regis Town, relegated from Division One
- Pagham, joined from the West Sussex League
- Wadhurst, relegated from Division One

=== League table ===
Pos	Team	Pld	W	D	L	GF	GA	GR	Pts	Qualification or relegation
1	Bognor Regis Town	30	23	5	2	99	27	3.667	51	Promoted to Division One
2	Burgess Hill Town	30	21	7	2	72	22	3.273	49	Promoted to Division One
3	Pagham	30	20	4	6	84	34	2.471	44	
4	Shoreham	30	19	5	6	52	27	1.926	43	
5	Portfield	30	18	5	7	77	45	1.711	41	
6	Newhaven	30	16	4	10	71	50	1.420	36	
7	Wadhurst	30	10	8	12	52	59	0.881	28	
8	Peacehaven & Telscombe	30	11	6	13	41	51	0.804	28	
9	Wick	30	8	9	13	38	52	0.731	25	
10	Selsey	30	9	6	15	66	79	0.835	24	
11	Hastings & St Leonards	30	10	3	17	45	63	0.714	23	
12	Old Varndeanians	30	7	8	15	43	63	0.683	22	
13	Steyning	30	8	5	17	46	69	0.667	21	
14	Wigmore Athletic	30	6	6	18	41	89	0.461	18	
15	Ferring	30	7	1	22	29	61	0.475	15	
16	Hastings Rangers	30	3	6	21	34	99	0.343	12	

Source: nonleaguematters
Rules for classification: 1) points; 2) goal ratio.
