= Redhill F.C. =

Association football club in England

Coordinates: 51°13′09″N 0°10′14″W

Redhill
- Full name: Redhill Football Club
- Nickname: The Lobsters or Reds
- Founded: 1894; 132 years ago
- Ground: Kiln Brow, Redhill
- Capacity: 2,000 (162) seated
- Chairman: Jerry O'Leary
- Manager: Andy Lampard
- League: Combined Counties League Premier Division South
- 2025–26: Combined Counties League Premier Division South, 8th of 20
Home colours	Away colours

Redhill F.C. is an English football club based in Redhill, Surrey. The club are currently members of the Combined Counties League Premier Division South and play at Kiln Brow. The club is affiliated to the Surrey County Football Association.

== Club history ==
=== The beginning ===
The club was formed in 1894. Redhill only played friendly matches for their first four seasons but in the 1898–99 season they competed in the South Suburban League, finishing 6th. Then followed another three seasons of playing in other local leagues before they were admitted to the East & West Surrey League, which they won in their first season. Two seasons later they reached the final of the Surrey Senior Cup final.

Redhill were accepted into the South Eastern League Division Two in 1906 and played in this division for three seasons, finishing fourth in 1908–09. They also finished 2nd in the Mid Surrey League during the same season. Following that they were 3rd in Section A of the Spartan League in 1909–10. They then finished 3rd in the South Suburban West League in 1910–11, before becoming South Suburban Champions in the 1911–12 season.

Redhill F.C. became London League members from 1921 to 1923, and finished runners up in their division at the end of the 1922–23 season. For the 1923–24 season they joined the Athenian League.

=== The Athenian League era ===
Redhill spent many years in the old Athenian League with such clubs as Barnet, Bromley, Sutton United and Grays Athletic. Fortunes were very mixed over the years, with Championships in 1924–25 and 1983–84. However, they also finished bottom of the league on several occasions: 1945–46, 1952–53, 1958–59, 1962–63, 1964–65 and 1977–78. The club also won the Surrey Senior Cup in the 1928–29 season, defeating Epsom Town 3–2 at Guildford City's Josephs Road ground.

During their time in the Athenian League, the club enjoyed its best performance in the FA Cup under the management of Frederick Setters. They reached the First Round proper for the only time in 1957 and took several thousand fans with them to Division Three (South) leaders Norwich City. They lost 6–1 but the Redhill team won great praise in the national press for a brave performance. A copy of the match day programme and an admission ticket are on display in the Clubhouse, along with other historic photographs of this game.

=== Life after Athenian ===
They won the last Athenian League championship in 1983–84 and were due to gain promotion. However, after being given notice to vacate their Memorial Sports Ground in the centre of the town, they were moved to Kiln Brow, situated about 2 miles to the south of the town. Without the required facilities, the club actually moved sideways in the pyramid into the London Spartan League. At the start of the 1987–88 season, after resigning from the London Spartan League, they joined the Sussex County League Division One. They were relegated to Division Two after two seasons. In 1996–97 they won promotion to Division One again by finishing third. They finished fifth in their first season back in Division One, yet all subsequent positions have hovered around mid-table.

=== Into the 21st century ===
In July 2007, Tommy Sampson was appointed manager with former Kingstonian and Bromley manager Stuart McIntyre becoming first team coach.

Sampson suffered a stroke in December 2007 and was replaced by McIntyre, who took the team to the semi-finals of the Sussex RUR Cup and the Surrey Senior Cup, and also finished the season in eighth place. The club's first top ten finish since 1997–98. Mcintyre stepped down early the following season due to other commitments and former Brighton & Hove Albion player John Crumplin took charge, but left the club in the summer after only reaching 7th place.

Dean Forbes then took over but struggled to commit due to business reasons and Marcus Alcindor, who was Forbes' assistant, took charge in December 2009. However, the start to this season was disappointing, having fallen at the first hurdle of both the FA Cup and FA Vase competitions, and the league campaign hadn't begun the way the club's board hoped it would. After a 1–1 draw away from home on 9 October at bottom of the table Eastbourne United, Redhill parted company with Alcindor and Steve Johnson was named his replacement.

On 18 April 2011 Redhill announced that Johnson had left the club by mutual agreement, leaving director of football Nigel Abbott to take over for the remaining four matches. In June 2011 the club appointed Simon Colbran, formerly of Worthing and Crowborough Athletic, where he won all three Sussex County League divisions, including the Division One championship.

In February 2012 Simon Colbran resigned to join Horsham, and was replaced by youth team manager Michael Maher. The following seasons saw the club gain promotion to Division One South of the Isthmian league when they finished as runners-up behind Peacehaven & Telscombe.

In 2014–15 Redhill finished 23rd out of 24 teams in Division One South and were relegated to the Combined Counties League.

=== Rivalries ===
Redhill are situated near to other footballing sides such as Reigate Priory, Merstham, South Park, Dorking and Dorking Wanderers.

== Nickname ==
The club's nickname is "The Lobsters". This name came into regular use in 1994 when a competition was held for people to think up a nickname for Redhill which would be more original than "The Reds". A local woman won the vote, after also naming a large toy lobster which was present at many home games called "Clawdius".

However, it later transpired that the nickname 'Lobsters' had been used long before the competition. In a 1928 Redhill FC handbook, "The Lobsters" was mentioned in the club's brief history and it is popular belief that the inspiration for the name came from the kit the club used in its very early days (which was still red and white stripes). When shirt manufacturing was not as it is today, the colours in the heavy cotton material would often bleed together after washing and the shirt would become a red-pink-ish lobster colour.

== Stadium ==
Redhill play their home games at Kiln Brow, Three Arch Road, Redhill, Surrey, RH1 5AE.

Redhill were moved to the ground in 1984, following over 80 years at the Memorial Sports Ground. Kiln Brow boasts a 162-seat stand, a clubhouse with licensed bar and function hall, modern changing room facilities, a canteen, museum and a club shop. Kiln Brow was granted its E grading, making the club eligible for promotion to step 4, in March 2010.

== Honours ==
=== League honours ===
- Sussex County Football League Division One:
  - Runners-up (1): 2012–13
- Athenian League Premier Division :
  - Winners (2): 1924–25, 1983–84
  - Runners-up (3): 1923–24, 1925–26, 1927–28
- Athenian League Division One:
  - Runners-up (1): 1966–67
- London League:
  - Runners-up (1): 1922–23
- Southern Suburban Premier :
  - Runners-up (1): 1920–21
- London Spartan League:
  - Runners-up (1): 1986–87
- Southern Suburban West Division :
  - Winners (1): 1911–12
- Mid Surrey League :
  - Runners-up (1): 1908–09
- East & West Surrey League :
  - Winners (1): 1902–03

=== Cup honours ===
- Surrey Senior Cup:
  - Winners (2): 1928–29, 1965–66
  - Runners-up (2): 1904–05, 1925–26, 1926–27, 1968–69
- Surrey Senior Shield:
  - Winners (2): 1935–36, 1968–69
  - Runners-up (4): 1908–09, 1920–21, 1925–26, 1928–29
- Athenian League Cup:
  - Winners (2): 1969–70, 1970–71
  - Runners-up (4): 1973–74, 1974–75
- Athenian League Cup:
  - Winners (2): 1969–70, 1970–71
  - Runners-up (2): 1973–74, 1974–75
- London Spartan League Cup:
  - Runners-up (1): 1984–85
- Southern Counties Floodlight Cup:
  - Winners (3): 1980–81, 1990–91, 1998–99
- Sussex County League Division Two Cup:
  - Winners (1): 1991–92
- Surrey Intermediate Cup:
  - Winners (2): 1923–24, 1925–26
  - Runners-up (1): 1926–27
- CCL Division 1 Challenge Cup:
  - Runners-up (1): 2016–17
- CCL Premier Challenge Cup:
  - Winners (1): 2020–21

== Records ==
=== Club records ===
- Highest League Position: 1st in Athenian League 1924–25, 1983–84
- FA Cup best performance: First round 1957–58
- FA Amateur Cup best performance: Semi-Final 1925–26
- FA Trophy best performance: Preliminary Qualifying round 1974–75, 1975–76, 2013–14, 2014–15
- FA Vase best performance: Fourth round 1976–77, 1981–82
- Highest Attendance: 7,000 at Memorial Park
- Highest Attendance at current Ground: 1,200 vs Crystal Palace 1989
- Biggest win: 12–0 vs Epsom Athletic 2017.

=== Player Records ===
- Most First Team Appearances: 766 – Brian Medlicott
- Most First Team AGoals: 119 – Steve Turner

== Former players ==
1. Players that have played/managed in the football league or any foreign equivalent to this level (i.e. fully professional league).
2. Players with full international caps.
- (England) Iffy Allen
- (England) Ronald Baird
- (England) Tim Elmes
- (England) George Goddard
- (England) Gavin McGowan
- (Republic of Ireland) Eugene Melaniphy
- (The Gambia) Jacob Mendy
- (England) Bill Miller

== Former coaches ==
1. Managers/Coaches that have played/managed in the football league or any foreign equivalent to this level (i.e. fully professional league).
2. Managers/Coaches with full international caps.
- (England) John Crumplin
- (England) Ian Dawes
- (England) George Smith
- (England) Tommy Sampson
