= Jack Hinshelwood =

English footballer (born 2005)

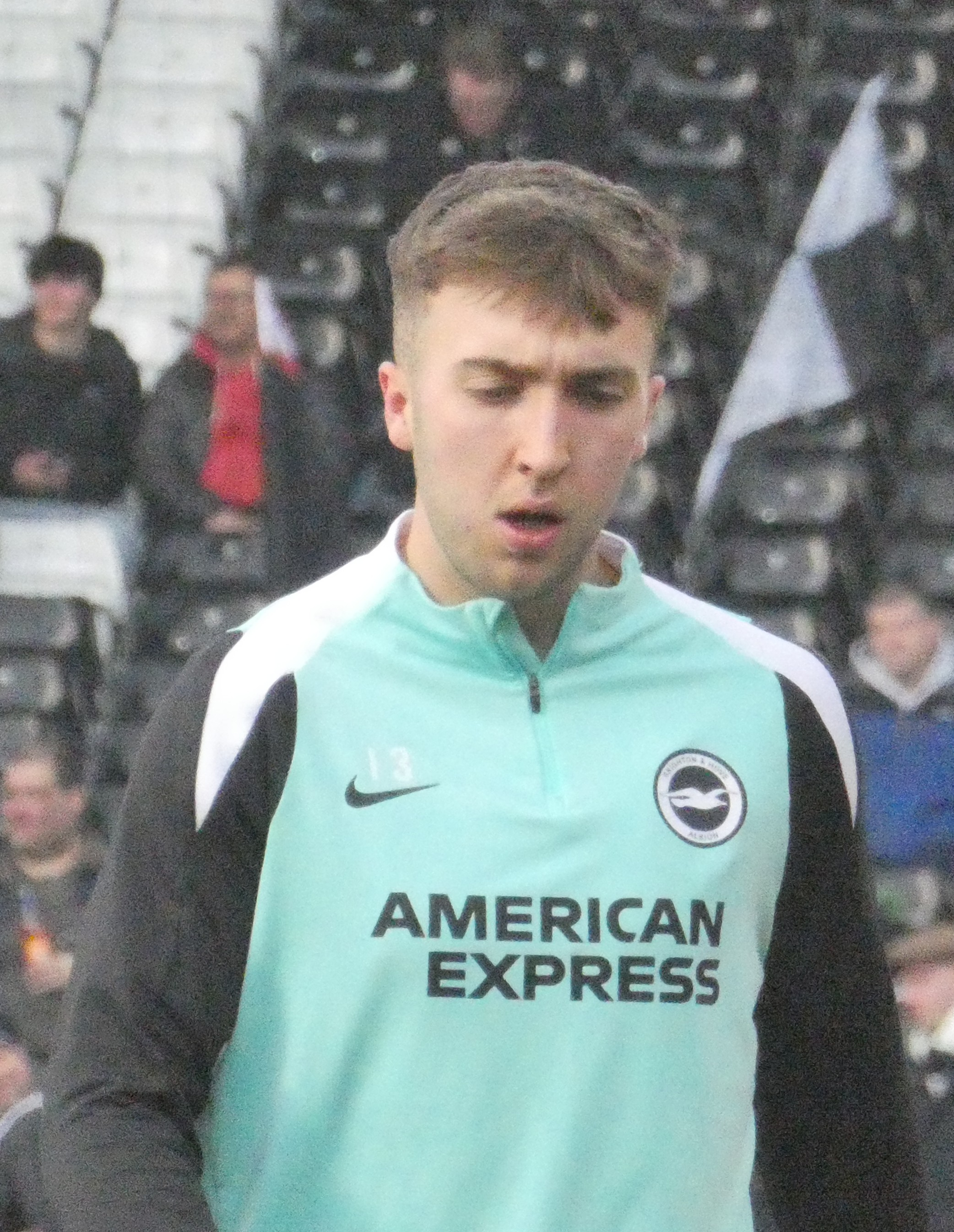
- Hinshelwood with Brighton & Hove Albion in 2026

Personal information
- Full name: Jack Luca Hinshelwood
- Date of birth: 11 April 2005 (age 21)
- Place of birth: Chichester, England
- Height: 5 ft 11 in (1.81 m)
- Position: Midfielder

Team information
- Current team: Brighton & Hove Albion
- Number: 8

Youth career
- 2012–2023: Brighton & Hove Albion

Senior career*
Years	Team	Apps	(Gls)
2023–	Brighton & Hove Albion	71	(15)

International career^{‡}
2023	England U18	6	(0)
2023	England U19	8	(0)
2024–	England U21	13	(0)
Medal record
Representing England
UEFA European Under-21 Championship
Winner	2025 Slovakia
- * Club domestic league appearances and goals as of 8 November 2026 ‡ National team caps and goals as of 16 November 2026

Jack Luca Hinshelwood (born 11 April 2005) is an English professional footballer who plays for Premier League club Brighton & Hove Albion and the England under-21 national team.

== Club career ==
Hinshelwood joined the youth academy of Brighton & Hove Albion at the age of 7, and worked his way up through their youth categories. He debuted with their under-18s in March 2021, and started his scholarship the following season at the age of 16. On 14 April 2023, he signed a professional contract with the club until 2026. He made his senior and professional debut with Brighton & Hove Albion as a late substitute replacing Deniz Undav in a 2–1 Premier League defeat to Aston Villa at Villa Park on 28 May 2023. He made his first start in a 6–1 defeat against Aston Villa on 30 September 2023.

On 6 December 2023, Hinshelwood scored his first career goal in a 2–1 home victory against Brentford. On 9 April 2024 he signed a new contract with Brighton until June 2028.

== International career ==
Hinshelwood is a youth international for England, representing England U18 in 2023. On 6 September 2023, Hinshelwood made his England U19 debut during a 1–0 defeat to Germany in Oliva.

On 9 September 2024, Hinshelwood made his England U21 debut during a 4–1 win over Austria at Kenilworth Road. He was called up for the 2025 UEFA European Under-21 Championship. He started in their quarter-final victory over Spain and semi-final win against Netherlands. On 28 June, Hinshelwood played every minute of the final as England defeated Germany 3–2 after extra time to lift the trophy.

== Playing style ==
Ben Fisher, speaking to the Irish Examiner, described Hinshelwood as a ball-playing central midfielder with tactical awareness, capable of playing in defensive positions, ambidextrous, and comfortable moving forward from midfield.

== Personal life ==
Hinshelwood comes from a family of footballers. His great-grandfather Wally Hinshelwood, his grandfather Paul, his father Adam, his great-uncle Martin, and his first cousin once removed Danny were all professional footballers. He is the cousin of fellow Brighton youth product Harry Howell.

== Career statistics ==
=== Club ===
As of match played 8 November 2026

Appearances and goals by club, season and competition
Club	Season	League			FA Cup		EFL Cup		Europe		Other		Total	
Club	Season	Division	Apps	Goals	Apps	Goals	Apps	Goals	Apps	Goals	Apps	Goals	Apps	Goals
Brighton & Hove Albion U21	2022–23	—			—		—		—		3 (Note: Appearances in EFL Trophy)	0	3	0
Brighton & Hove Albion U21	2023–24	—			—		—		—		2	0	2	0
Brighton & Hove Albion U21	Total		—		—		—		—		5	0	5	0
Brighton & Hove Albion	2022–23	Premier League	1	0	0	0	0	0	—		—		1	0
Brighton & Hove Albion	2023–24	Premier League	12	3	2	0	1	0	2 (Note: Appearances in UEFA Europa League)	0	—		17	3
Brighton & Hove Albion	2024–25	Premier League	26	5	3	0	2	0	—		—		31	5
Brighton & Hove Albion	2025–26	Premier League	27	4	2	0	1	0	—		—		30	4
Brighton & Hove Albion	2026–27	Premier League	5	3	0	0	1	0	4 (Note: Appearances in UEFA Conference League)	1	—		10	4
Brighton & Hove Albion	Total		71	15	7	0	5	0	6	1	0	0	89	16
Career total			71	15	7	0	5	0	6	1	5	0	94	16

== Honours ==
England U21

- UEFA European Under-21 Championship: 2025

Individual

- Brighton & Hove Albion Young Player of the Year: 2023–24
