= Tommy Sampson =

English footballer

Personal information
- Full name: Thomas William Sampson
- Date of birth: 18 August 1954 (age 72)
- Place of birth: Southwark, England
- Position: Central defender

Senior career*
Years	Team	Apps	(Gls)
1972–1973	Millwall	1	(0)
1974–1980	Dartford	181 (14)	(7)

Managerial career
- 1988–1989: Tonbridge Angels
- 1990-1991: Sheppey United
- 1991-1998: Herne Bay
- 1998–2000: Deal Town
- 2000-2001: Ashford Town
- 2001: Boreham Wood
- 2001–2005: Dartford
- 2007–2008: Redhill
- * Club domestic league appearances and goals

Thomas William Sampson (born 18 August 1954) is an English former professional footballer who played in the Football League, as a defender for one game for Millwall. He went on for a long non-league career with Dartford. After he finished playing he went on to manage Tonbridge Angels, Herne Bay, Deal Town, Ashford Town, Dartford FC. and Redhill. His most successful management moment was when he guided Deal Town to victory in the FA Vase in May 2000. However he suffered a stroke in December 2007, when he was manager of Redhill and stopped his management career in August 2008.

In March 2024, Sampson released his second book, detailing his playing and management career.
