= John Crumplin =

English footballer

Personal information
- Full name: John Leslie Crumplin
- Date of birth: 26 May 1967 (age 59)
- Place of birth: Bath, England
- Height: 5 ft 8 in (1.73 m)
- Position: Right back

Youth career
- Southampton

Senior career*
Years	Team	Apps	(Gls)
1983–198?	Bognor Regis Town		
198?–198?	Portsmouth	0	(0)
1985–1987	Bognor Regis Town		
1987–1994	Brighton & Hove Albion	207	(7)
1995–1996	Woking	48	(3)
1996–1997	Crawley Town	8	(0)
- Selsey
- East Preston
- Three Bridges
- St Leonards
- Lewes
- Crawley Down

Managerial career
- Selsey
- Three Bridges
- Crawley Down
- 2004–2006: Ringmer
- 2008: Crawley Down
- 2008–2009: Redhill
- 2009–2010: Walton and Hersham
- * Club domestic league appearances and goals

John Leslie Crumplin (born 26 May 1967) is an English former professional footballer who made more than 200 Football League appearances for Brighton & Hove Albion in the late 1980s and early 1990s. He played as a right back or on the right wing.

== Career ==
Crumplin was born in Bath, Somerset, in 1967, and spent his early childhood in Singapore, where his soldier father was stationed, before the family settled in Walberton, West Sussex. He was on the books of Southampton as a youngster, but his progress was interrupted by a broken leg, and he joined Bognor Regis Town. After playing for Bognor's first team at 16, he spent time on the books of Portsmouth, and returned to Bognor before signing for Brighton & Hove Albion in March 1987. making his debut in a 2–1 home defeat against Ipswich Town and supplied the cross from which Steve Gatting headed Brighton in front. He took a few years to establish himself in the side, and was released at the end of the 1992–93 season, before re-signing for one final campaign in which he took his totals to 245 appearances and 9 goals, of which 207 and 7 were in league competition.

After leaving Brighton, he played for Woking, contributing 3 goals from 48 Conference appearances as the team finished as runners-up in 1994–95 and 1995–96 as well as starting in the 1994–95 FA Trophy final. He later played for Crawley Town, Selsey, East Preston, Three Bridges, St Leonards, Lewes – where he also acted as physiotherapist – and Crawley Down.

He was player-manager of Selsey, Three Bridges, and Crawley Down, and then managed Ringmer, Crawley Down for a second spell, Redhill in October 2008, and Walton and Hersham from 2009 to 2010 when he resigned for work reasons.

== Honours ==
Woking

- FA Trophy: 1994–95
