= 24seven (company) =

Defunct British utility management company

24seven Utility Services Ltd.
- Company type: Subsidiary
- Industry: Electricity distribution
- Founded: 2000
- Founders: London Electricity; TXU Europe
- Headquarters: London, United Kingdom
- Area served: London and Eastern England
- Services: Electricity distribution network management
- Parent: London Electricity; TXU Europe

24seven, or 24seven Utility Services Ltd. was a utility management company that supplied over 5 million homes with electricity in the early part of the 21st century.

The company was created in 2000 to manage the electricity distribution networks in London and Eastern areas of the United Kingdom, by its parent companies, London Electricity and TXU Europe. The company was formed in response to tough price controls laid out by the UK energy regulator, OFGEM. It was believed that bringing the management of rival power networks under a single organization would yield economies of scale for its two shareholders. The company had ambitions to run other utilities including water and gas networks. Whilst these ambitions remained largely unfulfilled, some of the Directors and managers from 24seven now work at Thames Water.

24seven had a distinct orange and grey logo, with a verbose slogan ‘brilliant people running world class utility services’. Its white and orange vehicles became a familiar site around London and the surrounding area and even feature in the tableau of London streets in the popular model village Legoland.

The company was subsumed into LE Group in 2003 and then became part of EDF Energy, the UK branch of Électricité de France, before being acquired by Cheung Kong Holdings and renamed UK Power Networks.

== Sources ==
- EDF Energy Website
- 24seven launch press release
- Wilkommen bei 24seven
