= Paul Hinshelwood =

English footballer (1956–2022)

Personal information
- Full name: Paul Alexander Hinshelwood
- Date of birth: 14 August 1956
- Place of birth: Bristol, England
- Date of death: 15 January 2022 (aged 65)
- Height: 6 ft 0 in (1.83 m)
- Position: Right-back

Youth career
- –1973: Crystal Palace

Senior career*
Years	Team	Apps	(Gls)
1973–1983	Crystal Palace	276	(22)
1983–1984	Oxford United	45	(7)
1984–1986	Millwall	61	(2)
1986–1988	Colchester United	81	(6)
- Basildon United
- Dartford
- Chelmsford City
- Whyteleafe
Total		463	(37)

International career
1977–1980	England U21	2	(0)

Managerial career
- 1993–1994: Whyteleafe
- * Club domestic league appearances and goals

Paul Alexander Hinshelwood (14 August 1956 – 15 January 2022) was an English footballer who played as a right-back in the Football League for Crystal Palace, Oxford United, Millwall and Colchester United. He gained representative honours with the England under-21 team and also played and managed in non-league football. His sons Adam and Paul Jr. were also professional footballers.

== Early life ==
Hinshelwood was born in Bristol on 14 August 1956, and grew up in Croydon. In 1969, along with his brother Martin, he played in the final of the London FA Schools Cup, watched by former Crystal Palace manager Arthur Rowe. Rowe was impressed, and the brothers were invited for trials with the club. Both performed well, and were taken on as apprentices.

== Career ==
"Doris", as he was known by the fans, although his dressing room nickname was "Fish", originally began as a striker, but did not play that well in the role. In November 1976, Hinshelwood switched to playing at right-back. Along with future England left-back Kenny Sansom, he shored up the Palace defence, and the club were promoted twice in three seasons, to reach the First Division in 1979. In that season, Hinshelwood only missed one game, as Palace went up as champions.

Palace spent two years in the top flight, and Hinshelwood was voted as the fans' "Player of the Year" for both. As well as this, he gained two caps for the England under-21 side.

Hinshelwood left Palace in 1983, transferring to Oxford United. There, he won the Third Division title for the first time (Palace had only gone up in third place). He then transferred back to south-London, to Millwall, where he won promotion to Division 2. He was then sold for a nominal sum along with Nicky Chatterton to Colchester United and then went to non-league clubs Basildon United, Dartford and Chelmsford City.

Later, he would reunite with former Palace teammate Steve Kember, as his assistant at Whyteleafe, and would become their manager after Kember left to take up a coaching role at Palace.

In 2005, Paul was named in Palace's Centenary XI.

== Personal life and death ==
Hinshelwood's family also have a strong footballing background. His father Wally was a professional footballer in the 1950s and '60s, most notably at Reading and Bristol City. His older brother Martin played for Crystal Palace before his career was cut short because of injury, and became Director of Football at Brighton & Hove Albion as well as managing the club for a time. Paul's son Adam is also a retired professional and his son Paul Jr. also had a football career. His nephew (Martin Hinshelwood's son) Danny and grandson Jack were also professional footballers.

He died in January 2022, at the age of 65. Crystal Palace announced his death on their website, on 15 January.

== Honours ==
Crystal Palace

- Football League Second Division: 1978–79

Oxford United

- Football League Third Division: 1983–84
