= Adam Hinshelwood =

English footballer (born 1984)

Personal information
- Full name: Adam Hinshelwood
- Date of birth: 8 January 1984 (age 42)
- Place of birth: Oxford, England
- Height: 5 ft 10 in (1.78 m)
- Position: Centre back

Team information
- Current team: Worthing (manager)

Youth career
- –2002: Brighton & Hove Albion

Senior career*
Years	Team	Apps	(Gls)
2002–2009	Brighton & Hove Albion	100	(2)
2008	→ Lewes (loan)	4	(0)
2009–2010	Aldershot Town	15	(0)
2010	Wycombe Wanderers	13	(1)
Total		132	(3)

Managerial career
- 2011–2013: Selsey
- 2013–2015: Worthing
- 2017: Hastings United
- 2017–2024: Worthing
- 2024–2025: York City
- 2025–: Worthing
- * Club domestic league appearances and goals

Adam Hinshelwood (born 8 January 1984) is an English football manager and former player who is manager of National League club Worthing.

== Playing career ==
=== Brighton & Hove Albion ===
Hinshelwood was born in Oxford and joined Brighton & Hove Albion as a trainee. He turned professional in August 2002, while his uncle, Martin Hinshelwood was Brighton manager. He made his league debut on 10 August 2002 in a 3–1 victory away to Burnley, picking up man-of-the-match honours from the sports press. He made more than 40 appearances in the Championship for Brighton over the next couple of seasons, playing so well that he was selected for the England U21 squad for games against Wales and Azerbaijan in October 2004.

Shortly after this call up, he was about to receive a letter from the FA informing him that he was being considered for the Toulon Tournament in the summer of 2005, when the results of a scan showed that he had ruptured his ACL. Returning from this injury in the 2006–07 season, Hinshelwood even captained the Brighton side, becoming one of the youngest captains in club history. A second ACL operation was followed by two more minor procedures to repair surface damage. Upon his return from rehabilitation, Hinshelwood was loaned to Lewes, where he helped the struggling Conference team win three of the five games in which he played, his form prompting Brighton to recall him early from his loan spell.

It was announced on 12 May 2009, that Hinshelwood would be leaving Brighton after the expiration of his contract at the end of June 2009.

=== Aldershot Town ===
Hinshelwood signed for Aldershot Town on 28 July 2009 on a one-year deal, and on 6 August Aldershot manager Gary Waddock announced that Hinshelwood would be the captain for the 2009–10 season.

=== Wycombe Wanderers ===
Hinshelwood subsequently signed for Wycombe Wanderers on 1 January 2010 on a free transfer, until the end of the season. He became Wycombe's club captain in early March, taking the armband from previous captain Craig Woodman. On 14 July 2010, Hinshelwood announced his retirement from football due to a serious knee injury.

== Career statistics ==
Appearances and goals by club, season and competition
Club	Season	League			FA Cup		League Cup		Other		Total	
Club	Season	Division	Apps	Goals	Apps	Goals	Apps	Goals	Apps	Goals	Apps	Goals
Brighton & Hove Albion	2002–03	Division One	7	0	0	0	0	0	0	0	7	0
Brighton & Hove Albion	2003–04	Division Two	18	0	1	0	2	0	1 (Note: Appearance(s) in Football League Trophy)	0	22	0
Brighton & Hove Albion	2004–05	Championship	38	1	1	0	1	0	0	0	40	1
Brighton & Hove Albion	2005–06	Championship	11	0	0	0	0	0	0	0	11	0
Brighton & Hove Albion	2006–07	League One	11	0	2	0	0	0	3	0	16	0
Brighton & Hove Albion	2007–08	League One	1	0	0	0	0	0	0	0	1	0
Brighton & Hove Albion	2008–09	League One	14	1	0	0	0	0	2	0	16	1
Brighton & Hove Albion	Total		100	2	4	0	3	0	6	0	113	2
Lewes (loan)	2008–09	Conference Premier	4	0	0	0	0	0	0	0	4	0
Aldershot Town	2009–10	League Two	15	0	1	0	1	0	1	0	18	0
Wycombe Wanderers	2009–10	League One	13	1	0	0	0	0	0	0	13	1
Career total			132	3	5	0	4	0	7	0	148	3

== Post-playing career ==
For the 2011–12 season Hinshelwood was appointed assistant manager of non-league club Hastings United. His tenure was short lived, and he decided to follow in his family's footsteps by becoming the manager of Sussex County League side, Selsey, replacing former manager Ian Martin. He would then go on to become a player and assistant manager at Burgess Hill Town FC under Ian Chapman. He eventually became the manager of Worthing FC. He then left Worthing in 2015 to become a full-time coach at Brighton & Hove Albion. Hinshelwood returned to Worthing in 2017 and led them to the Isthmian Premier Division title in the 2021–22 season. and the Sussex Senior Challenge Cup in the 2022–23 season.

On 27 February 2024, Hinshelwood was appointed manager of National League club York City on a long-term deal. Following a strong start to the 2024–25 season, he was named National League Manager of the Month for September 2024 having picked up 12 points from six unbeaten matches. On 28 August 2025, York City announced that Hinshelwood would be leaving the club with immediate effect.

On 9 October 2025, Hinshelwood returned to National League South club Worthing on a contract until the end of the 2027–28 season. A 2–0 win over Ebbsfleet United on the final day of the 2025–26 season saw the club secure the National League South title. Following the season's conclusion, he was named National League South Manager of the Season.

== Personal life ==
Hinshelwood is the son of ex-England under-21 and Crystal Palace footballer Paul Hinshelwood. His grandfather Wally was also a professional footballer. His son Jack plays for Brighton & Hove Albion in the Premier League.

== Managerial statistics ==
As of match played 24 February 2026

Managerial record by team and tenure
Team	From	To	Record								Ref
Team	From	To	G	W	D	L	GF	GA	GD	Win %	Ref
Worthing	25 December 2013	10 June 2015	76	33	16	27	143	127	+16	43.42	
Hastings United	16 May 2017	23 September 2017	10	3	2	5	15	20	−5	30.00	
Worthing	25 September 2017	27 February 2024	367	185	72	110	721	560	+161	50.41	
York City	27 February 2024	28 August 2025	71	38	17	16	120	70	+50	53.52	
Worthing	9 October 2025	Present	46	25	7	14	72	34	+38	54.35	
Total			552	276	111	165	1,071	811	+260	50.00	—

== Honours ==
=== As a player ===
Brighton & Hove Albion

- Football League Second Division play-offs: 2004

=== As a manager ===
Worthing

- National League South: 2025–26
- Isthmian League Premier Division: 2021–22
- Sussex Senior Challenge Cup: 2022–23; runner-up: 2021–22

Individual

- National League South Manager of the Season: 2025–26
- National League Manager of the Month: September 2024
- National League South Manager of the Month: January 2023, August 2023
