= Tim Elmes =

English footballer

Personal information
- Full name: Timothy Elmes
- Date of birth: 28 September 1962 (age 64)
- Place of birth: Croydon, England
- Position: Midfielder

Senior career*
Years	Team	Apps	(Gls)
1980–1982	Chelsea	4	(0)
- Orient
- Croydon
- Redhill
- * Club domestic league appearances and goals

Timothy Elmes (born 28 September 1962) is an English former professional footballer who played in the Football League as a midfielder.

Elmes signed as an apprentice with Chelsea in July 1979. He left Chelsea in 1982, spent a short time with Orient, and went on to play for Croydon and then Redhill.

== Sources ==
- Tim Elmes, Neil Brown
