= Danny Hinshelwood =

English footballer (born 1975)

Personal information
- Full name: Daniel Martin Hinshelwood
- Date of birth: 4 December 1975 (age 50)
- Place of birth: Bromley, England
- Position: Defender

Team information
- Current team: Selsey FC

Youth career
- 1990–1992: Nottingham Forest

Senior career*
Years	Team	Apps	(Gls)
1992–1996	Nottingham Forest	0	(0)
1996–1998	Portsmouth	5	(0)
1997	Torquay United	6	(0)
1998–1999	Brighton & Hove Albion	4	(0)
1999	Bognor Regis Town		
1999–2000	Havant & Waterlooville		
2000–2003	Selsey		
2004–2009	Selsey		

Managerial career
- 2000–2003: Selsey
- 2004–2009: Selsey
- * Club domestic league appearances and goals

Daniel Martin Hinshelwood (born 4 December 1975) is an English former professional footballer.

== Career ==
Hinshelwood was born in Bromley. He began his career as apprentice with Nottingham Forest on leaving the FA School of Excellence, one of his duties being to walk Brian Clough's dog. He won England Youth honours and an FA Youth Cup winners' medal while at Forest, turning professional in December 1992. He found it impossible to break into the first team at the City Ground and left on a free transfer in February 1996, joining Portsmouth.

He made his league debut later that season, but after five games for Pompey fell out of the reckoning and joined Torquay United on loan on 2 March 1997, playing six games for Kevin Hodges' side. He was released by Portsmouth at the end of the following season, joining Brighton & Hove Albion on a short-term contract in August 1998, but was released by the Seagulls in January 1999.

He joined Bognor Regis Town, moving on to Havant & Waterlooville in October 1999 before being appointed player-manager of Selsey on 7 January 2000. He transformed the Selsey side, his success leading to offers from bigger sides. In 2003, Selsey won the John O'Hara League Cup, but he quit the club in July that year after his budget for the following season had been considerably reduced.

He subsequently returned to manage Selsey in April 2004.

In 2007, Hinshelwood was appointed as assistant manager of the Sussex County side, combining this post with his duties at Selsey. He left Selesey in November 2009.

== Personal life ==
His father Martin played professionally for Crystal Palace, among others, and was Brighton's Director of Youth Football while he was at the club. His younger brother Scott was an apprentice with Portsmouth and played under him for Selsey, as did their cousin Marc, the son of Paul, the former Crystal Palace and Millwall player.
