= Selsey F.C. =

Association football club in England

Coordinates: 50°44′02.35″N 0°47′35.88″W

Selsey
- Full name: Selsey Football Club
- Nickname: The Seals
- Founded: 1903
- Ground: The High Street Ground, Selsey
- Capacity: Unknown
- Chairman: David Lee
- Manager: Daren Pearce
- League: Southern Combination Division One
- 2024–25: Southern Combination Division One, 15th of 20
Home colours	Away colours

Selsey Football Club is a semi-professional football club based in Selsey, West Sussex, England. The club is a FA Chartered Standard Community club affiliated to the Sussex County Football Association. The club are currently members of the Southern Combination Division One and play at the High Street Ground.

== History ==
The club was formed in 1903 playing in various local grounds, before settling at their current home of the High Street ground in the late 1940s. The club played in the West Sussex Football League, winning their first league title in the 1938–39 season, and then winning it a further five times after the Second World War. While in the West Sussex Football League, the club also won the Sussex County FA Intermediate Cup in the 1958–59 campaign.

The 1960–61 season saw the club win their last of their six West Sussex Football League titles and gain promotion to Division Two of the Sussex County Football League. The club finished as runners up in their first season, and repeated this finish in the next seasons. The 1963–64 campaign saw the club do a double by finishing top of the division and winning the Division Two cup, they also gained promotion to Division One. The club then spent five seasons in Division One before being relegated back to Division Two, at the end of the 1968–69 competition, during which time they made their debut in the FA Cup in the 1967–68 season.

It took the club another seven seasons before they reached Division One, again as champions of Division Two. However they could only spend two seasons in Division One before being relegated and the club took another nine seasons before they bounced back up as runners up in the 1986–87 competition. After just four seasons the club was once again relegated to Division Two, when they finished bottom of the division in the 1990–91 season. As before the club eventually bounced back up to Division One when at the end of the 1995–96 campaign they finished in the runners-up position.

The club in January 2000 employed former Brighton & Hove Albion defender, Danny Hinshelwood as player manager at the age of 24. Under his management the club went on to win the Sussex Royal Ulster Rifles Charity Cup in the 2001–02 season, followed by the John O'Hara League Cup the following season. In their eighth season in Division One, Hinshelwood left the club in July 2003 due to the club reducing the playing budget, and the club was relegated at the end of the season. Manager Danny Hinshelwood returned to the club the following season after Richie Reynolds resigned and in the 2005–06 season, they finished as runners-up in Division Two and were promoted to Division One.

Hinshelwood stayed till November 2009, when he resigned and was replaced by Gary Block, during which time he guided the club to another Sussex RUR cup final in the 2007–08 campaign where they lost to Three Bridges 4–0. However Gary Block only stayed for a season before resigning and was replaced with Adam Hinshelwood. Adam Hinshelwood then guided the club to their third Sussex RUR cup final, but they lost to Rye United 2–0. Adam Hinshelwood then quit the club at the end of the season to join Burgess Hill Town, as assistant manager. Richard Towers then took over as manager, but only remained in charge for a few months before he resigned and Adam Hinshelwood returned in November 2012 to take over as manager again.

== Ground ==
Selsey play their home games at High Street Ground, High Street, Selsey, Sussex, PO20 0QG.

== Honours ==
=== League honours ===
- Sussex County Football League Division Two:
  - Champions (2): 1963–64, 1975–76
  - Runners up (5): 1961–62, 1962–63, 1986–87, 1995–96, 2005–06,
- West Sussex Football League Division One:
  - Champions (6): 1938–39, 1954–55, 1956–57, 1957–58, 1958–59, 1960–61

=== Cup honours ===
- Sussex Senior Challenge Cup
  - Runners up (1): 1962–63
- Sussex Junior Challenge Cup
  - Winners (1): 1976-1977
- The Sussex Royal Ulster Rifles Charity Cup
  - Winners (1): 2001–02
  - Runners up (2): 2007–08, 2011–12
- Sussex County Football League John O'hara Cup
  - Winners (1): 2002–03
  - Runners up (1): 1989–90
- Sussex County Football League Division Two Cup
  - Winners (3): 1963–64, 1986–87, 1995–96
  - Runners up (2): 1984–85, 1994–95
- Sussex County Intermediate Cup
  - Winners (1): 1958–59
- West Sussex Football League Malcolm Simmonds Memorial
  - Winners (4): 1955–56, 1956–57, 1957–58, 1958–59

== Records ==
- Highest League Position: 4th in Sussex county league Division One 2001–02, 2002–03
- FA Cup best performance: Second qualifying round – 1967–68, 1991–92, 2000–01, 2002–03
- FA Vase best performance: Third round – 1975–76, 2001–02, 2002–03, 2006–07, 2008–09

== Former players ==
1. Players that have played/managed in the football league or any foreign equivalent to this level (i.e. fully professional league).
2. Players with full international caps.
- (Lebanon) Omar Bugiel
- (England) John Crumplin
- (England) Danny Hinshelwood
- (England) Lee Molyneaux

== Former coaches ==
1. Managers/Coaches that have played/managed in the football league or any foreign equivalent to this level (i.e. fully professional league).
2. Managers/Coaches with full international caps.
- (England) John Crumplin
- (England) Danny Hinshelwood
