= Martin Hinshelwood =

English footballer (born 1953)

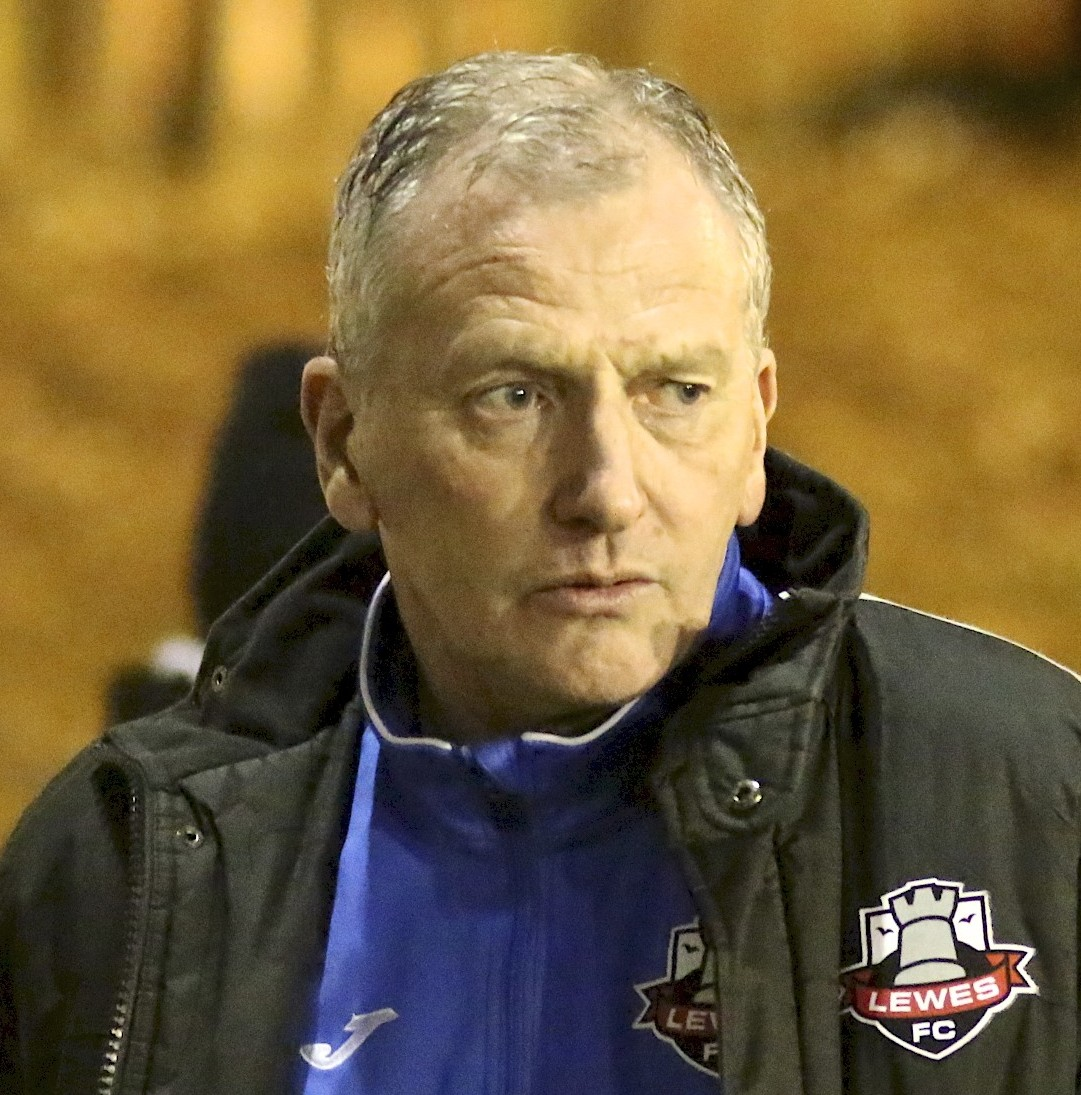
- Hinshelwood with Lewes in 2015

Personal information
- Full name: Martin Alan Hinshelwood
- Date of birth: 16 June 1953 (age 73)
- Place of birth: Reading, England
- Position: Midfielder

Team information
- Current team: Lewes (Academy coach)

Youth career
- –1972: Crystal Palace

Senior career*
| Years | Team | Apps | (Gls) |
| 1972–1977 | Crystal Palace | 69 | (4) |

Managerial career
- 2001: Brighton & Hove Albion (caretaker)
- 2002: Brighton & Hove Albion
- 2009: Brighton & Hove Albion (caretaker)
- 2013: Crawley Town (interim)
- 2015: Lewes (caretaker)
- * Club domestic league appearances and goals

Martin Hinshelwood (born 16 June 1953) is an English football coach and former professional player. He is currently a scout at Brighton and Hove Albion FC. His previous roles include being interim manager at Crawley Town alongside Gary Alexander, following the sacking of manager Richie Barker.

== Career ==
Hinshelwood was born in Reading, but grew up in Croydon, and in 1969, (along with his brother Paul) played in the final of the London FA Schools Cup, watched by then Crystal Palace manager Arthur Rowe. Rowe was impressed, and the brothers were invited for trials with the club. Both performed well, and were taken on as apprentices.

Hinshelwood played in the centre of midfield, and quickly fought his way into the team, while his brother initially languished in the lower echelons of the club.

Hinshelwood was part of the team that reached the semi-final of the 1976 FA Cup, and played in the defeats of Leeds United, Chelsea, and Sunderland (all away from home). In the semi-final game, Third Division Palace were drawn against Second Division Southampton. Despite the Saints being a tier above the Eagles, Palace were cast as favourites. Hinshelwood missed the game through injury, and some see this as the reason that Southampton beat Palace by two goals to nil.

That injury proved to dominate Hinshelwood's career, and it eventually led to his retiring from the game, in late 1977. He briefly played again as player/manager at Leatherhead F.C. in the Isthmian Premier in 1980–81 and 1981–82, taking over from long serving Manager Billy Miller.

He went into management in later years at Palace's arch-rivals Brighton & Hove Albion. He originally began as the youth coach, but when Micky Adams departed following promotion, he was appointed caretaker manager, along with Bob Booker. Ex-Palace teammate Peter Taylor succeeded Adams, and guided Albion to another successive promotion. He too then left the manager's post, and this time Hinshelwood stepped up to the position on a full-time basis. Brighton were then in Division One. However, after losing twelve games consecutively, he was moved to director of football, and Steve Coppell came in as manager. Albion were relegated, though Coppell nearly achieved the impossible in keeping the club up. With the departure of Albion manager Russell Slade in November 2009, Hinshelwood was again appointed caretaker manager.

== Personal life ==
Hinshelwood's family also have a strong footballing background. His father Wally was a professional footballer in the 1950s, most notably at Reading and Bristol City. His brother Paul had a long career at Crystal Palace and also represented the England under-21 team. His son Danny had a brief professional career, and his nephews (Paul's sons) Adam, Paul Jr. and grand nephew Jack were & are presently, also professional footballers.
