= 2024 HKFC Soccer Sevens =

Tournament details
- Country: Hong Kong
- Dates: 24–26 May 2024
- Teams: 12

Final positions
- Champions: Brighton & Hove Albion
- Runners-up: Aston Villa

2024 HKFC Soccer Sevens, officially known as The HKFC Standard Chartered Soccer Sevens due to sponsorship reasons, was the 21st edition and the 25-year anniversary edition of the HKFC Soccer Sevens tournament. It was the first edition of the tournament to have a women's competition.

Unlike with previous editions, which happened after the end of the domestic season, the 2024 edition took place during the final weekend of the 2023–24 Hong Kong Premier League season. A potential title-deciding match between Kitchee and Lee Man was scheduled for the same weekend as the Soccer Sevens, leading to those teams pulling out of the competition.

== Competing Teams ==
The draw for the tournament took place on 12 April 2024.

=== Masters Tournament ===
Group A

- (England) PFA All Stars:
  - (Scotland) Scott Shearer
  - (England) Andy Griffin
  - (England) Kyel Reid
  - (Republic of Ireland) Liam Lawrence
  - (England) Ryan Shotton
  - (Portugal) Luís Boa Morte
  - (Jamaica) Barry Hayles
  - (England) Leroy Lita
  - (England) Zavon Hines
  - (England) Jamie Cureton
  - (Scotland) Scott McGleish
  - (England) Lee Mansell
  - (England) Hayden Mullins
- (Hong Kong) Ampcontrol Discovery Bay
- (Hong Kong) HKFC Chairman's Select
- (Hong Kong) HKFC Masters

Group B

- (England) Wallsend Boys Club
- Singapore Cricket Club Masters
- Singapore FC Masters
- (Hong Kong) Kowloon Cricket Club Veterans

=== Main Tournament ===
Group A

- (England) Aston Villa U21:
  - (England) James Wright
  - (England) Todd Alcock
  - (Netherlands) Lamare Bogarde
  - (England) Omari Kellyman
  - (England) Charlie Lutz
  - (England) Kobei Moore
  - (England) Finley Munroe
  - (England) Kyrie Pierre
  - (England) Rico Richards
  - (Netherlands) Sil Swinkels
- (England) West Ham United U21:
  - (England) Ezra Mayers
  - (England) Tyron Akpata
  - (England) Brad Dolaghan
  - (Wales) Liam Jones
  - (England) Sean Tarima
  - (England) Gideon Kodua
  - (Republic of Ireland) Sean Moore
  - (England) Mason Terry
  - (Northern Ireland) Patrick Kelly
  - (Northern Ireland) Michael Forbes
- (Hong Kong) Yau Yee League Select
- (Hong Kong) HKFC Captain's Select

Group B

- (Japan) Yokohama F. Marinos Youth:
  - (Japan) Kento Shirasu
  - (Japan) Aiki Sekino
  - (Japan) Reno Noguchi
  - (Japan) Mirai Yoshizawa
  - (Japan) Yuma Tokuda
  - (Japan) Haruki Uenishi
  - (Japan) Shoma Yamashita
  - (Japan) Shunsuke Yokoyama
  - (Japan) Yusei Wada
  - (Japan) Yusei Hayakawa
- (England) Brighton & Hove Albion U21:
  - (England) Hugo Fisher
  - (England) Benjamin Jackson
  - (England) Joshua Duffus
  - (England) Jacob Slater
  - (Republic of Ireland) Jamie Mullins
  - (England) Benicio Baker-Boaitey
  - (England) Kamari Doyle
  - (England) Louis Flower
  - (England) Caylan Vickers
  - (England) Luca Barrington
- Hong Kong Rangers
  - (Ukraine) Oleksiy Shlyakotin
  - (Ghana) Nassam Ibrahim
  - (Japan) Yumemi Kanda
  - (Japan) Ryota Hayashi
  - (Brazil) Luizinho
  - (Hong Kong) Yuen Tsun Nam
  - (Hong Kong) Lam Hin Ting
  - (Hong Kong) Yiu Ho Ming
  - (Hong Kong) Lau Chi Lok
  - (Hong Kong) Chiu Ching Yu
- Singapore FC

Group C

- (England) Fulham U21:
  - (England) Oliver Gofford
  - (England) Alfie McNally
  - (England) Calum McFarlane
  - (Scotland) Connor McAvoy
  - (England) Damon Park
  - (Wales) Callum Osmand
  - (England) Aaron Loupalo-Bi
  - (Finland) Terry Ablade
  - (England) Terrell Works
  - (England) Lemar Gordon
- (Scotland) Rangers B:
  - (Scotland) Jacob Pazikas
  - (Scotland) Connor Allan
  - (Scotland) Kristian Webster
  - (Scotland) Mackenzie Strachan
  - (Scotland) Alexander Hutton
  - (England) Paul Nsio
  - (Scotland) Leyton Grant
  - (Scotland) Kerr Robertson
  - (England) Archie Stevens
  - (Scotland) Findlay Curtis
- Hong Kong U20:
  - (Hong Kong) Tuscany Shek
  - (Hong Kong) Moses Wu
  - (Hong Kong) Dai Tsz Hin
  - (Hong Kong) Liu Hing Yau
  - (Hong Kong) Ma Chin Ho
  - (Hong Kong) Matthew Slattery
  - (Hong Kong) Tsang Chun Hin
  - (Hong Kong) Wong Sum Chit
  - (Hong Kong) Chan Kwang Ching Osmond
  - (Hong Kong) Tsang Lok To Jeremy
- Hong Kong Football Club

Group D

- (England) Leicester City U21:
  - (England) Brad Young
  - (Jamaica) Brandon Cover
  - (Portugal) Wanya Marçal
  - (England) Henry Cartwright
  - (England) Jayden Joseph
  - (Wales) Oli Ewing
  - (England) Logan Briggs
  - (England) Amani Richards
  - (Wales) Chris Popov
  - (England) Silko Thomas
- (England) Newcastle United U21:
  - (England) Adam Harrison
  - (England) Logan Watts
  - (England) Harry Powell
  - (England) Alfie Harrison
  - (England) James Huntley
  - (Scotland) Johnny Emerson
  - (England) Darren Palmer
  - (England) Dylan Stephenson
  - (England) Sean Neave
  - (England) Joe Brayson
- (Hong Kong) Tai Po:
  - (Hong Kong) Alex Chin
  - (Hong Kong) Pang Yam Pung
  - (Brazil) Kayron
  - (Hong Kong) Yap Wai Ming
  - (Hong Kong) Cheung Lik Hang
  - (Hong Kong) Wong Cho Sum
  - (Hong Kong) Yuen Hei Kan
  - (Hong Kong) Chung Ka Hing
  - (Hong Kong) Ali Ammar
  - (Hong Kong) Khan Sahil
- Singapore Cricket Club

=== Women's Tournament ===
Group A

- (Hong Kong) Shatin SA
- (Hong Kong) Soar 24/7 FC
- (Hong Kong) Kitchee
- Chelsea FC Soccer School Hong Kong

Group B

- Hong Kong Football Club
- Macau Women's National Team
- (Hong Kong) Grace Citizen
- (Hong Kong) Wofoo Social Enterprises

== Main Tournament - Group Stage ==
All times are Hong Kong Time (UTC+8)

=== Group A ===
Team	Pld	W	D	L	GF	GA	GD	Pts
(England) Aston Villa U21	3	3	0	0	6	0	+6	9
(England) West Ham United U21	3	2	0	1	6	3	+3	6
(Hong Kong) Yau Yee League Select	3	0	1	2	1	3	−2	1
(Hong Kong) HKFC Captain's Select	3	0	1	2	0	7	−7	1

Updated to match(es) played on 25 May 2024. Source:

25 May 2024	(England) Aston Villa U21	2–0	West Ham United U21 (England)	Hong Kong
15:10				Stadium: Hong Kong Football Club Stadium

25 May 2024	(England) Aston Villa U21	3–0	HKFC Captain's Select (Hong Kong)	Hong Kong
16:18				Stadium: Hong Kong Football Club Stadium

25 May 2024	(England) West Ham United U21	2–1	Yau Yee League Select (Hong Kong)	Hong Kong
16:35				Stadium: Hong Kong Football Club Stadium

25 May 2024	(England) Aston Villa U21	1–0	Yau Yee League Select (Hong Kong)	Hong Kong
17:43				Stadium: Hong Kong Football Club Stadium

25 May 2024	(England) West Ham United U21	4–0	HKFC Captain's Select (Hong Kong)	Hong Kong
18:00				Stadium: Hong Kong Football Club Stadium

25 May 2024	(Hong Kong) Yau Yee League Select	0–0	HKFC Captain's Select (Hong Kong)	Hong Kong
19:08				Stadium: Hong Kong Football Club Stadium

=== Group B ===
Team	Pld	W	D	L	GF	GA	GD	Pts
Hong Kong Rangers	3	2	1	0	3	1	+2	7
(England) Brighton & Hove Albion U21 (Note: Placings decided by a first-goal-wins playoff)	3	1	1	1	2	2	0	4
(Japan) Yokohama F. Marinos Youth	3	1	1	1	2	2	0	4
Singapore FC	3	0	1	2	1	3	−2	1

Updated to match(es) played on 25 May 2024. Source:

25 May 2024	(England) Brighton & Hove Albion U21	0–1	Hong Kong Rangers	Hong Kong
10:49				Stadium: Hong Kong Football Club Stadium

25 May 2024	(Japan) Yokohama F. Marinos Youth	1–0	Singapore FC	Hong Kong
11:03				Stadium: Hong Kong Football Club Stadium

25 May 2024	(England) Brighton & Hove Albion U21	1–0	Singapore FC	Hong Kong
12:11				Stadium: Hong Kong Football Club Stadium

25 May 2024	(Japan) Yokohama F. Marinos Youth	0–1	Hong Kong Rangers	Hong Kong
12:28				Stadium: Hong Kong Football Club Stadium

25 May 2024	(Japan) Yokohama F. Marinos Youth	1–1	Brighton & Hove Albion U21 (England)	Hong Kong
13:36				Stadium: Hong Kong Football Club Stadium

25 May 2024	Hong Kong Rangers	1–1	Singapore FC	Hong Kong
13:53				Stadium: Hong Kong Football Club Stadium

=== Group C ===
Team	Pld	W	D	L	GF	GA	GD	Pts
(England) Fulham U21	3	2	1	0	6	2	+4	7
(Scotland) Rangers B	3	2	1	0	5	1	+4	7
Hong Kong Football Club	3	0	1	2	1	3	−2	1
Hong Kong U20	3	0	1	2	0	6	−6	1

Updated to match(es) played on 25 May 2024. Source:

25 May 2024	Hong Kong Football Club	0–0	Hong Kong U20	Hong Kong
10:12				Stadium: Hong Kong Football Club Stadium

25 May 2024	(England) Fulham U21	1–1	Rangers B (Scotland)	Hong Kong
10:29				Stadium: Hong Kong Football Club Stadium

25 May 2024	Hong Kong Football Club	0–1	Rangers B (Scotland)	Hong Kong
11:37				Stadium: Hong Kong Football Club Stadium

25 May 2024	(England) Fulham U21	3–0	Hong Kong U20	Hong Kong
11:54				Stadium: Hong Kong Football Club Stadium

25 May 2024	(England) Fulham U21	2–1	Hong Kong Football Club	Hong Kong
13:02				Stadium: Hong Kong Football Club Stadium

25 May 2024	Hong Kong U20	0–3	Rangers B (Scotland)	Hong Kong
13:19				Stadium: Hong Kong Football Club Stadium

=== Group D ===
Team	Pld	W	D	L	GF	GA	GD	Pts
(England) Leicester City U21	3	2	1	0	6	1	+5	7
(England) Newcastle United U21	3	1	2	0	4	1	+3	5
Singapore Cricket Club	3	0	2	1	0	3	−3	2
(Hong Kong) Tai Po	3	0	1	2	0	5	−5	1

Updated to match(es) played on 25 May 2024. Source:

25 May 2024	(England) Leicester City U21	3–0	Singapore Cricket Club	Hong Kong
15:27				Stadium: Hong Kong Football Club Stadium

25 May 2024	(England) Newcastle United U21	3–0	Tai Po (Hong Kong)	Hong Kong
15:44				Stadium: Hong Kong Football Club Stadium

25 May 2024	(England) Leicester City U21	1–1	Newcastle United U21 (England)	Hong Kong
16:52				Stadium: Hong Kong Football Club Stadium

25 May 2024	(England) Leicester City U21	2–0	Tai Po (Hong Kong)	Hong Kong
18:17				Stadium: Hong Kong Football Club Stadium

25 May 2024	(England) Newcastle United U21	0–0	Singapore Cricket Club	Hong Kong
18:34				Stadium: Hong Kong Football Club Stadium

25 May 2024	(Hong Kong) Tai Po	0–0	Singapore Cricket Club	Hong Kong
19:25				Stadium: Hong Kong Football Club Stadium

== Women's Tournament - Group Stage ==
=== Group A ===
Team	Pld	W	D	L	GF	GA	GD	Pts
(Hong Kong) Kitchee	3	1	2	0	4	1	+3	5
Chelsea FC Soccer School Hong Kong	3	1	2	0	4	1	+3	5
(Hong Kong) Soar 24/7 FC	3	1	2	0	4	3	+1	5
(Hong Kong) Shatin SA	3	0	0	3	1	8	−7	0

Updated to match(es) played on 25 May 2024. Source:

24 May 2024	(Hong Kong) Shatin SA	1–2	Soar 24/7 FC (Hong Kong)	Hong Kong
17:30				Stadium: Hong Kong Football Club Stadium

24 May 2024	(Hong Kong) Kitchee	0–0	Chelsea FC Soccer School Hong Kong	Hong Kong
17:47				Stadium: Hong Kong Football Club Stadium

24 May 2024	(Hong Kong) Shatin SA	0–3	Chelsea FC Soccer School Hong Kong	Hong Kong
19:46				Stadium: Hong Kong Football Club Stadium

24 May 2024	(Hong Kong) Soar 24/7 FC	1–1	Kitchee (Hong Kong)	Hong Kong
20:20				Stadium: Hong Kong Football Club Stadium

25 May 2024	(Hong Kong) Soar 24/7 FC	1–1	Chelsea FC Soccer School Hong Kong	Hong Kong
08:30				Stadium: Hong Kong Football Club Stadium

25 May 2024	(Hong Kong) Shatin SA	0–3	Kitchee (Hong Kong)	Hong Kong
08:47				Stadium: Hong Kong Football Club Stadium

=== Group B ===
Team	Pld	W	D	L	GF	GA	GD	Pts
(Hong Kong) Grace Citizen	3	3	0	0	9	0	+9	9
(Hong Kong) Wofoo Social Enterprises	3	1	1	1	3	1	+2	4
Hong Kong Football Club	3	1	1	1	2	3	−1	4
Macau Women's National Team	3	0	0	3	0	10	−10	0

Updated to match(es) played on 25 May 2024. Source:

24 May 2024	Hong Kong Football Club	2–0	Macau Women's National Team	Hong Kong
18:04				Stadium: Hong Kong Football Club Stadium

24 May 2024	(Hong Kong) Grace Citizen	1–0	Wofoo Social Enterprises (Hong Kong)	Hong Kong
18:21				Stadium: Hong Kong Football Club Stadium

24 May 2024	Hong Kong Football Club	0–0	Wofoo Social Enterprises (Hong Kong)	Hong Kong
20:03				Stadium: Hong Kong Football Club Stadium

24 May 2024	Macau Women's National Team	0–5	Grace Citizen (Hong Kong)	Hong Kong
20:37				Stadium: Hong Kong Football Club Stadium

25 May 2024	Hong Kong Football Club	0–3	Grace Citizen (Hong Kong)	Hong Kong
09:38				Stadium: Hong Kong Football Club Stadium

25 May 2024	(Hong Kong) Wofoo Social Enterprises	3–0	Macau Women's National Team	Hong Kong
09:55				Stadium: Hong Kong Football Club Stadium

== Masters Tournament - Group Stage ==
=== Group A ===
Team	Pld	W	D	L	GF	GA	GD	Pts
(Hong Kong) HKFC Masters	3	2	0	1	4	2	+2	6
(England) PFA All Stars	3	2	0	1	3	2	+1	6
(Hong Kong) Ampcontrol Discovery Bay	3	1	1	1	2	3	−1	4
(Hong Kong) HKFC Chairman's Select	3	0	1	2	3	5	−2	1

Updated to match(es) played on 25 May 2024. Source:

24 May 2024	(Hong Kong) Ampcontrol Discovery Bay	0–2	HKFC Masters (Hong Kong)	Hong Kong
18:55				Stadium: Hong Kong Football Club Stadium

24 May 2024	(England) PFA All Stars	2–1	HKFC Chairman's Select (Hong Kong)	Hong Kong
19:29				Stadium: Hong Kong Football Club Stadium

25 May 2024	(England) PFA All Stars	0–1	Ampcontrol Discovery Bay (Hong Kong)	Hong Kong
16:01				Stadium: Hong Kong Football Club Stadium

25 May 2024	(England) PFA All Stars	1–0	HKFC Masters (Hong Kong)	Hong Kong
17:09				Stadium: Hong Kong Football Club Stadium

25 May 2024	(Hong Kong) HKFC Chairman's Select	1–1	Ampcontrol Discovery Bay (Hong Kong)	Hong Kong
17:26				Stadium: Hong Kong Football Club Stadium

25 May 2024	(Hong Kong) HKFC Chairman's Select	1–2	HKFC Masters (Hong Kong)	Hong Kong
18:51				Stadium: Hong Kong Football Club Stadium

=== Group B ===
Team	Pld	W	D	L	GF	GA	GD	Pts
(England) Wallsend Boys Club	3	2	1	0	4	0	+4	7
Singapore FC Masters	3	1	1	1	1	1	0	4
(Hong Kong) Kowloon Cricket Club Veterans	3	1	1	1	1	2	−1	4
Singapore Cricket Club Masters	3	0	1	2	0	3	−3	1

Updated to match(es) played on 25 May 2024. Source:

24 May 2024	Singapore Cricket Club Masters	0–1	Singapore FC Masters	Hong Kong
18:38				Stadium: Hong Kong Football Club Stadium

24 May 2024	(England) Wallsend Boys Club	2–0	Kowloon Cricket Club Veterans (Hong Kong)	Hong Kong
19:12				Stadium: Hong Kong Football Club Stadium

25 May 2024	(England) Wallsend Boys Club	2–0	Singapore Cricket Club Masters	Hong Kong
09:04				Stadium: Hong Kong Football Club Stadium

25 May 2024	Singapore FC Masters	0–1	Kowloon Cricket Club Veterans (Hong Kong)	Hong Kong
09:21				Stadium: Hong Kong Football Club Stadium

25 May 2024	Singapore Cricket Club Masters	0–0	Kowloon Cricket Club Veterans (Hong Kong)	Hong Kong
11:20				Stadium: Hong Kong Football Club Stadium

25 May 2024	(England) Wallsend Boys Club	0–0	Singapore FC Masters	Hong Kong
12:45				Stadium: Hong Kong Football Club Stadium

== Final Stage ==
=== Main Cup ===
The top two teams from each group qualify for the Main Cup.

==== Quarter-Finals ====
26 May 2024	(England) Aston Villa U21	2–0	Rangers B (Scotland)	Hong Kong
10:46				Stadium: Hong Kong Football Club Stadium

26 May 2024	(England) West Ham United U21	1–3	Fulham U21 (England)	Hong Kong
11:09				Stadium: Hong Kong Football Club Stadium

26 May 2024	Hong Kong Rangers	1–0	Newcastle United U21 (England)	Hong Kong
11:32				Stadium: Hong Kong Football Club Stadium

26 May 2024	(England) Brighton & Hove Albion U21	2–1	Leicester City U21 (England)	Hong Kong
11:55				Stadium: Hong Kong Football Club Stadium

==== Semi-Finals ====
26 May 2024	(England) Aston Villa U21	2–0	Hong Kong Rangers (Hong Kong)	Hong Kong
15:33				Stadium: Hong Kong Football Club Stadium

26 May 2024	(England) Fulham U21	1–3	Brighton & Hove Albion U21 (England)	Hong Kong
15:56				Stadium: Hong Kong Football Club Stadium

==== Final ====
26 May 2024
18:36

(England) Aston Villa U21	0–2	Brighton & Hove Albion U21 (England)
		Flower; Baker-Boaitey

Hong Kong Football Club Stadium, Hong Kong

=== Main Shield ===
The losing quarter-finalists from the Main Cup compete in the Main Shield.

==== Semi-Finals ====
26 May 2024	(Scotland) Rangers B	3–2 (a.e.t.)	Newcastle United U21 (England)	Hong Kong
14:47				Stadium: Hong Kong Football Club Stadium

26 May 2024	(England) West Ham United U21	2–2 (a.e.t.) (3–4 p)	Leicester City U21 (England)	Hong Kong
15:10				Stadium: Hong Kong Football Club Stadium

==== Final ====
26 May 2024
17:23

(Scotland) Rangers B	1–2 (a.e.t.)	Leicester City U21 (England)
Allan		Thomas; Young

Hong Kong Football Club Stadium, Hong Kong

=== Main Plate ===
The third and fourth placed teams from each group compete in the Main Plate.

==== Quarter-Finals ====
26 May 2024	(Hong Kong) Yau Yee League Select	1–0	Hong Kong U20 (Hong Kong)	Hong Kong
09:38				Stadium: Hong Kong Football Club Stadium

26 May 2024	(Hong Kong) HKFC Captain's Select	1–1 (a.e.t.) (2–1 p)	Hong Kong Football Club (Hong Kong)	Hong Kong
09:55				Stadium: Hong Kong Football Club Stadium

26 May 2024	(Japan) Yokohama F. Marinos Youth	6–0	Tai Po (Hong Kong)	Hong Kong
10:12				Stadium: Hong Kong Football Club Stadium

26 May 2024	Singapore FC	1–0	Singapore Cricket Club (Singapore)	Hong Kong
10:29				Stadium: Hong Kong Football Club Stadium

==== Semi-Finals ====
26 May 2024	(Hong Kong) Yau Yee League Select	1–1 (3–2 p)	HKFC Captain's Select (Hong Kong)	Hong Kong
14:13				Stadium: Hong Kong Football Club Stadium

26 May 2024	(Japan) Yokohama F. Marinos Youth	2–0	Singapore FC (Singapore)	Hong Kong
14:30				Stadium: Hong Kong Football Club Stadium

==== Final ====
26 May 2024
17:06

(Hong Kong) Yau Yee League Select	1–4	Yokohama F. Marinos Youth (Japan)
Shonday		Yokoyama; Shirasu; Uenishi

Hong Kong Football Club Stadium, Hong Kong

=== Women's Cup ===
The top two teams from each Women's group qualify for the Women's Cup.

==== Semi-Finals ====
26 May 2024	(Hong Kong) Grace Citizen	1–2	Chelsea FC Soccer School Hong Kong	Hong Kong
12:48				Stadium: Hong Kong Football Club Stadium

26 May 2024	(Hong Kong) Kitchee	1–0	Wofoo Social Enterprises (Hong Kong)	Hong Kong
13:05				Stadium: Hong Kong Football Club Stadium

==== Final ====
26 May 2024
17:46

Chelsea FC Soccer School Hong Kong	0–0	Kitchee (Hong Kong)
Penalties
Tsung (penalty scored); C. Chung (penalty scored); Hongku (penalty scored)	3–1	(penalty missed) T. Chung; (penalty scored) Maggie

Hong Kong Football Club Stadium, Hong Kong

=== Women's Plate ===
The third and fourth placed teams in each Women's group compete in the Women's Plate.

==== Semi-Finals ====
26 May 2024	Hong Kong Football Club	2–0	Shatin SA (Hong Kong)	Hong Kong
08:30				Stadium: Hong Kong Football Club Stadium

26 May 2024	Macau Women's National Team	0–0 (a.e.t.) (3–2 p)	Soar 24/7 FC (Hong Kong)	Hong Kong
08:47				Stadium: Hong Kong Football Club Stadium

==== Final ====
26 May 2024
16:49

Macau Women's National Team	0–1	Hong Kong Football Club
		Benjamin

Hong Kong Football Club Stadium, Hong Kong

=== Masters Cup ===
The top two teams from each Masters group qualify for the Masters Cup.

==== Semi-Finals ====
26 May 2024	(Hong Kong) HKFC Masters	0–2	Singapore FC Masters	Hong Kong
13:22				Stadium: Hong Kong Football Club Stadium

26 May 2024	(England) PFA All Stars	1–0 (a.e.t.)	Wallsend Boys Club (England)	Hong Kong
13:39				Stadium: Hong Kong Football Club Stadium

==== Final ====
26 May 2024
18:11

Singapore FC Masters	1–2	PFA All Stars (England)
Culane		Lita

Hong Kong Football Club Stadium, Hong Kong

=== Masters Plate ===
The third and fourth placed teams in each Masters group compete in the Masters Plate.

==== Semi-Finals ====
26 May 2024	(Hong Kong) Ampcontrol Discovery Bay	1–0	Singapore Cricket Club Masters (Singapore)	Hong Kong
09:04				Stadium: Hong Kong Football Club Stadium

26 May 2024	(Hong Kong) HKFC Chairman's Select	1–2	Kowloon Cricket Club Veterans (Hong Kong)	Hong Kong
09:21				Stadium: Hong Kong Football Club Stadium

==== Final ====
26 May 2024
13:56

(Hong Kong) Ampcontrol Discovery Bay	0–0	Kowloon Cricket Club Veterans (Hong Kong)
Penalties
Anan (penalty scored); Malanese (penalty scored)	2–1	(penalty scored) Malone; (penalty missed) Delegase

Hong Kong Football Club Stadium, Hong Kong
