= 2023 HKFC Soccer Sevens =

Tournament details
- Country: Hong Kong
- Dates: 26–28 May 2023

Final positions
- Champions: Aston Villa
- Runners-up: Tai Po FC

2023 HKFC Soccer Sevens, officially known as The HKFC Citi Soccer Sevens due to sponsorship reasons, was the 21st staging of the HKFC Soccer Sevens tournament. It was the first edition of the tournament since 2019, due to the COVID-19 pandemic in Hong Kong.

== Competing Teams ==
The draw for the tournament took place on 26 April 2023, and was adjudicated by former Premier League player Les Ferdinand. The final fixture list was finalised on 15 May 2023.

=== Masters Tournament ===
Group A

- Wallsend Boys Club
- Ampcontrol Discovery Bay - Ho Kwok Chuen, Tita Chou, Luciano, Christian Annan, Aender, Steve McGurgan, David Jordan, Paul Crompton, Sammy Micke-Dongo, Mahenya Nasir, Nik Light
- HKFC Chairman's Select
- Singapore FC Masters - Ronnie Smollett, Juma'at Jantan, Martin Rigby, Samuel Balls, Fazrul Nawaz, Liam Shotton, Neil Kee, Shahril Ishak, Neil Shonhard, Matt Hulen, Mike Hemmingway
- Singapore Cricket Club Masters - Tan Chun Hao, Gary Ong Junsheng, Sudhershen Hariram, Jerald Tan Wei Shu, John Norfolk, Mo Yasin, Kevin Ted Tze Yong, PJ Roberts, Rob Gulston, Martin Goerojo, Justin Madhavan

Group B

- Citi All Stars - Jamie Lawrence, Pascal Chimbonda, Paul Robinson, Will Hoskins, Sean Davis, Noel Hunt, Barry Hayles, Gary Alexander, Anton Robinson, Jamal Campbell-Ryce
- HKFC Masters
- Rio Cricket Associação Atlética - Cadu, Andre Amaral, Marijan Vlak, Luiz Antônio Romeiro, Caio Benício, Bruno Côrtes, Marcelo Konte, Rafinha, Daniel, Deyvid Sacconi, Bruno Bastos
- Kowloon Cricket Club Veterans
- Yau Yee League Masters

=== Main Tournament ===
Group A

- Aston Villa U21 - Todd Alcock, Mikell Barnes, Frankie Ealing, I-Lani Edwards, Omari Kellyman, Jack McDowell, Tommi O'Reilly, Charlie Pavey, Edward Rowe, James Wright
- Rangers B - Lewis Budinauckas, Kelsey Ewen, Robbie Fraser, Connor Allan, Ben Williamson, Mackenzie Strachan, James Graham, Kai Kennedy, Connor Young, Robbie Ure
- Tai Po FC - Li Hon Ho, Tse Ka Wing, Fung Kwun Ming, Law Chun Ting, Chung Wai Keung, Luizinho, Chan Hiu Fung, Lee Ka Ho, Wong Cho Sum, Gabriel Cividini, Cheng Tsz Sum
- Yau Yee League Select

Group B

- Fulham U21 - Alfie McNally, Jay Williams, Idris Odutayo, Harvey Araujo, Georgios Okkas, Kristian Šekularac, Calum McFarlane, Oliver Sanderson, Terry Ablade, Martial Godo
- Kitchee - Ainikaer Maihemuti, Charlie Scott, Hélio, Cleiton, Ho Chun Ting, Tan Chun Lok, Jordon Brown, Cheng Chin Lung, Marco Pirie, Chang Kwong Yin, Chen Ngo Hin, Tsang Chun Hin
- MUST CPK
- Singapore FC - Santino Shepherd, Jack Cullinane, Zulfadli Zainal Abidin, Abdil Qaiyyim Mutalib, Tim Walter, Khairul Nizam, Joe Claridge, Michael Brook, Sam Taylor, Ales Melechovsky

Group C

- Newcastle United U21 - Max Thompson, Alex Murphy, Remi Savage, Matt Bondswell, Jordan Hackett, Nathan Carlyon, Jamie Miley, James Huntley, Amadou Diallo, Michael Ndiweni
- Leicester City U21 - Chituru Odunze, Joe Wormleighton, Harvey Godsmark-Ford, Lewis Brunt, Brandon Cover, Deniche Hill, Kasey McAteer, Wanya Marçal-Madivadua, Kian Pennant, Tawanda Maswanhise
- Hong Kong Football Club
- HKFC Captain's Select

Group D

- Brighton & Hove Albion U21 - Killian Cahill, Ruairi McConville, Benicio Baker-Boaitey, Benjamin Jackson, Jamie Mullins, Jack Hinchy, Leigh Kavanagh, Mark O'Mahony, Bailey Smith, Luca Barrington
- Queens Park Rangers B - Matteo Salamon, Steven Bala, Isaac Pitblado, Harun Hamid, Rayan Kolli, Deon Woodman, Hamzad Kargbo, Arkell Jude-Boyd, Joseph Ajose, Lorent Talla
- Hong Kong U23 - Pong Cheuk Hei, Michael Wan, Chan Yun Tung, Yim Kai Cheuk, Yip Cheuk Man, Lai Hoi To, Lau Kwan Ching, Kwok Chun Nok, Tang In Chim, Lam Lok Yin, Ho Lung Ho, Ho Ka Chi, Lee Hok Him, Krisna Korani
- Singapore Cricket Club - Ethan Gomez, Timothy Tan, Indra Putra, Aarish Kumar, Azizi Rahman, Charles Stark, Lucas Lim, Joshua Tan, Justin Kong, Chang Guo Guang

== Main Tournament - Group Stage ==
All times are Hong Kong Time (UTC+8)

=== Group A ===
Team	Pld	W	D	L	GF	GA	GD	Pts
(England) Aston Villa U21	3	2	0	1	5	1	+4	6
(Hong Kong) Tai Po FC	3	1	1	1	1	1	0	4
(Hong Kong) Yau Yee League Select	3	1	1	1	1	2	−1	4
(Scotland) Rangers B	3	0	2	1	0	3	−3	2

Updated to match(es) played on 27 May 2023. Source:

27 May 2023	(Scotland) Rangers B	0–0	Yau Yee League Select (Hong Kong)	Hong Kong
15:57				Stadium: Hong Kong Football Club Stadium

27 May 2023	(England) Aston Villa U21	0–1	Tai Po FC (Hong Kong)	Hong Kong
16:14				Stadium: Hong Kong Football Club Stadium

27 May 2023	(England) Aston Villa U21	3–0	Rangers B (Scotland)	Hong Kong
17:39				Stadium: Hong Kong Football Club Stadium

27 May 2023	(Hong Kong) Tai Po FC	0–1	Yau Yee League Select (Hong Kong)	Hong Kong
17:56				Stadium: Hong Kong Football Club Stadium

27 May 2023	(England) Aston Villa U21	2–0	Yau Yee League Select (Hong Kong)	Hong Kong
18:47				Stadium: Hong Kong Football Club Stadium

27 May 2023	(Scotland) Rangers B	0–0	Tai Po FC (Hong Kong)	Hong Kong
19:21				Stadium: Hong Kong Football Club Stadium

=== Group B ===
Team	Pld	W	D	L	GF	GA	GD	Pts
(Hong Kong) Kitchee	3	2	1	0	8	1	+7	7
(England) Fulham U21	3	2	1	0	5	1	+4	7
Singapore FC	3	0	1	2	0	3	−3	1
(Macau) MUST CPK	3	0	1	2	0	8	−8	1

Updated to match(es) played on 27 May 2023. Source:

27 May 2023	(Hong Kong) Kitchee	5–0	MUST CPK (Macau)	Hong Kong
09:34				Stadium: Hong Kong Football Club Stadium

27 May 2023	(England) Fulham U21	1–0	Singapore FC	Hong Kong
09:51				Stadium: Hong Kong Football Club Stadium

27 May 2023	(Hong Kong) Kitchee	2–0	Singapore FC	Hong Kong
11:16				Stadium: Hong Kong Football Club Stadium

27 May 2023	(England) Fulham U21	3–0	MUST CPK (Macau)	Hong Kong
11:33				Stadium: Hong Kong Football Club Stadium

27 May 2023	(Macau) MUST CPK	0–0	Singapore FC	Hong Kong
12:41				Stadium: Hong Kong Football Club Stadium

27 May 2023	(England) Fulham U21	1–1	Kitchee (Hong Kong)	Hong Kong
13:15				Stadium: Hong Kong Football Club Stadium

=== Group C ===
Team	Pld	W	D	L	GF	GA	GD	Pts
(England) Leicester City U21	3	2	1	0	4	1	+3	7
(England) Newcastle United U21	3	1	1	1	2	2	0	4
Hong Kong Football Club	3	1	1	1	1	3	−2	4
(Hong Kong) HKFC Captain's Select	3	0	1	2	0	2	−2	1

Updated to match(es) played on 27 May 2023. Source:

27 May 2023	(England) Newcastle United U21	0–0	Hong Kong Football Club	Hong Kong
10:08				Stadium: Hong Kong Football Club Stadium

27 May 2023	(England) Leicester City U21	0–0	HKFC Captain's Select (Hong Kong)	Hong Kong
10:25				Stadium: Hong Kong Football Club Stadium

27 May 2023	(England) Leicester City U21	3–0	Hong Kong Football Club	Hong Kong
11:50				Stadium: Hong Kong Football Club Stadium

27 May 2023	(England) Newcastle United U21	1–0	HKFC Captain's Select (Hong Kong)	Hong Kong
12:07				Stadium: Hong Kong Football Club Stadium

27 May 2023	Hong Kong Football Club	1–0	HKFC Captain's Select (Hong Kong)	Hong Kong
12:58				Stadium: Hong Kong Football Club Stadium

27 May 2023	(England) Leicester City U21	2–1	Newcastle United U21 (England)	Hong Kong
13:32				Stadium: Hong Kong Football Club Stadium

=== Group D ===
Team	Pld	W	D	L	GF	GA	GD	Pts
(England) Brighton & Hove Albion U21	3	2	1	0	5	1	+4	7
(England) Queens Park Rangers B	3	1	2	0	4	1	+3	5
Hong Kong U23	3	1	1	1	1	1	0	4
Singapore Cricket Club	3	0	0	3	0	7	−7	0

Updated to match(es) played on 27 May 2023. Source:

27 May 2023	(England) Queens Park Rangers B	0–0	Hong Kong U23	Hong Kong
15:23				Stadium: Hong Kong Football Club Stadium

27 May 2023	(England) Brighton & Hove Albion U21	3–0	Singapore Cricket Club	Hong Kong
15:40				Stadium: Hong Kong Football Club Stadium

27 May 2023	(England) Brighton & Hove Albion U21	1–1	Queens Park Rangers B (England)	Hong Kong
17:05				Stadium: Hong Kong Football Club Stadium

27 May 2023	Hong Kong U23	1–0	Singapore Cricket Club	Hong Kong
17:22				Stadium: Hong Kong Football Club Stadium

27 May 2023	(England) Brighton & Hove Albion U21	1–0	Hong Kong U23	Hong Kong
18:30				Stadium: Hong Kong Football Club Stadium

27 May 2023	(England) Queens Park Rangers B	3–0	Singapore Cricket Club	Hong Kong
19:04				Stadium: Hong Kong Football Club Stadium

== Masters Tournament - Group Stage ==
=== Group A ===
Team	Pld	W	D	L	GF	GA	GD	Pts
(England) Wallsend Boys Club	4	2	2	0	7	1	+6	8
(Hong Kong) Ampcontrol Discovery Bay	4	2	2	0	4	1	+3	8
Singapore FC Masters	4	2	1	1	4	3	+1	7
(Hong Kong) HKFC Chairman's Select	4	1	1	2	2	4	−2	4
Singapore Cricket Club Masters	4	0	0	4	1	9	−8	0

Updated to match(es) played on 27 May 2023. Source:

26 May 2023	Singapore Cricket Club Masters	0–2	HKFC Chairman's Select (Hong Kong)	Hong Kong
18:36				Stadium: Hong Kong Football Club Stadium

26 May 2023	(England) Wallsend Boys Club	0–0	Ampcontrol Discovery Bay (Hong Kong)	Hong Kong
18:54				Stadium: Hong Kong Football Club Stadium

26 May 2023	Singapore FC Masters	1–0	HKFC Chairman's Select (Hong Kong)	Hong Kong
19:48				Stadium: Hong Kong Football Club Stadium

26 May 2023	Singapore Cricket Club Masters	1–2	Ampcontrol Discovery Bay (Hong Kong)	Hong Kong
20:06				Stadium: Hong Kong Football Club Stadium

26 May 2023	(England) Wallsend Boys Club	1–1	Singapore FC Masters	Hong Kong
20:42				Stadium: Hong Kong Football Club Stadium

27 May 2023	Singapore FC Masters	0–2	Ampcontrol Discovery Bay (Hong Kong)	Hong Kong
14:49				Stadium: Hong Kong Football Club Stadium

27 May 2023	(England) Wallsend Boys Club	3–0	HKFC Chairman's Select (Hong Kong)	Hong Kong
15:06				Stadium: Hong Kong Football Club Stadium

27 May 2023	(Hong Kong) Ampcontrol Discovery Bay	0–0	HKFC Chairman's Select (Hong Kong)	Hong Kong
16:31				Stadium: Hong Kong Football Club Stadium

27 May 2023	Singapore Cricket Club Masters	0–2	Singapore FC Masters	Hong Kong
16:48				Stadium: Hong Kong Football Club Stadium

27 May 2023	Singapore Cricket Club Masters	0–3	Wallsend Boys Club (England)	Hong Kong
18:13				Stadium: Hong Kong Football Club Stadium

=== Group B ===
Team	Pld	W	D	L	GF	GA	GD	Pts
(Hong Kong) HKFC Masters	4	2	2	0	6	2	+4	8
(Brazil) Rio Cricket Associação Atlética	4	2	1	1	3	2	+1	7
(United States) Citi All Stars	4	2	1	1	3	3	0	7
(Hong Kong) Kowloon Cricket Club Veterans	4	1	2	1	2	1	+1	5
(Hong Kong) Yau Yee League Masters	4	0	0	4	0	6	−6	0

Updated to match(es) played on 27 May 2023. Source:

26 May 2023	(Brazil) Rio Cricket Associação Atlética	1–0	Kowloon Cricket Club Veterans (Hong Kong)	Hong Kong
18:00				Stadium: Hong Kong Football Club Stadium

26 May 2023	(Hong Kong) HKFC Masters	2–0	Yau Yee League Masters (Hong Kong)	Hong Kong
18:18				Stadium: Hong Kong Football Club Stadium

26 May 2023	(United States) Citi All Stars	0–0	Kowloon Cricket Club Veterans (Hong Kong)	Hong Kong
19:12				Stadium: Hong Kong Football Club Stadium

26 May 2023	(Hong Kong) HKFC Masters	1–1	Rio Cricket Associação Atlética (Brazil)	Hong Kong
19:30				Stadium: Hong Kong Football Club Stadium

26 May 2023	(United States) Citi All Stars	1–0	Yau Yee League Masters (Hong Kong)	Hong Kong
20:24				Stadium: Hong Kong Football Club Stadium

27 May 2023	(Brazil) Rio Cricket Associação Atlética	1–0	Yau Yee League Masters (Hong Kong)	Hong Kong
09:00				Stadium: Hong Kong Football Club Stadium

27 May 2023	(Hong Kong) HKFC Masters	0–0	Kowloon Cricket Club Veterans (Hong Kong)	Hong Kong
09:17				Stadium: Hong Kong Football Club Stadium

27 May 2023	(Hong Kong) Yau Yee League Masters	0–2	Kowloon Cricket Club Veterans (Hong Kong)	Hong Kong
10:42				Stadium: Hong Kong Football Club Stadium

27 May 2023	(United States) Citi All Stars	1–0	Rio Cricket Associação Atlética (Brazil)	Hong Kong
10:59				Stadium: Hong Kong Football Club Stadium

27 May 2023	(United States) Citi All Stars	1–3	HKFC Masters (Hong Kong)	Hong Kong
12:24				Stadium: Hong Kong Football Club Stadium

== Final Stage ==
=== Main Cup ===
The top two teams from each group qualify for the Main Cup.

==== Quarter-Finals ====
28 May 2023	(England) Aston Villa U21	2–0	Newcastle United U21 (England)	Hong Kong
10:18				Stadium: Hong Kong Football Club Stadium

28 May 2023	(England) Leicester City U21	0–1	Tai Po FC (Hong Kong)	Hong Kong
10:43				Stadium: Hong Kong Football Club Stadium

28 May 2023	(Hong Kong) Kitchee	2–0	Queens Park Rangers B (England)	Hong Kong
11:08				Stadium: Hong Kong Football Club Stadium

28 May 2023	(England) Brighton & Hove Albion U21	1–0	Fulham U21 (England)	Hong Kong
11:33				Stadium: Hong Kong Football Club Stadium

==== Semi-Finals ====
28 May 2023	(England) Aston Villa U21	1–0	Kitchee (Hong Kong)	Hong Kong
14:48				Stadium: Hong Kong Football Club Stadium

28 May 2023	(Hong Kong) Tai Po FC	1–1 (a.e.t.) (4–2 p)	Brighton & Hove Albion U21 (England)	Hong Kong
15:13				Stadium: Hong Kong Football Club Stadium

==== Final ====
28 May 2023	(England) Aston Villa U21	3–0	Tai Po FC (Hong Kong)	Hong Kong
17:48				Stadium: Hong Kong Football Club Stadium

=== Main Shield ===
The losing semi-finalists from the Main Cup compete in the Main Shield.

==== Semi-Finals ====
28 May 2023	(England) Newcastle United U21	2–1	Queens Park Rangers B (England)	Hong Kong
13:58				Stadium: Hong Kong Football Club Stadium

28 May 2023	(England) Leicester City U21	2–0	Fulham U21 (England)	Hong Kong
14:28				Stadium: Hong Kong Football Club Stadium

==== Final ====
28 May 2023	(England) Newcastle United U21	2–1 (a.e.t.)	Leicester City U21 (England)	Hong Kong
16:58				Stadium: Hong Kong Football Club Stadium

=== Main Plate ===
The third and fourth placed teams from each group compete in the Main Plate.

==== Quarter-Finals ====
28 May 2023	(Hong Kong) Yau Yee League Select	0–2	HKFC Chairman's Select (Hong Kong)	Hong Kong
09:06				Stadium: Hong Kong Football Club Stadium

28 May 2023	(Hong Kong) Hong Kong Football Club	0–2	Rangers B (Scotland)	Hong Kong
09:24				Stadium: Hong Kong Football Club Stadium

28 May 2023	Singapore FC	1–0	Singapore Cricket Club (Singapore)	Hong Kong
09:42				Stadium: Hong Kong Football Club Stadium

28 May 2023	Hong Kong U23	2–0	MUST CPK (Macau)	Hong Kong
10:00				Stadium: Hong Kong Football Club Stadium

==== Semi-Finals ====
28 May 2023	(Hong Kong) HKFC Chairman's Select	1–2	Singapore FC	Hong Kong
13:22				Stadium: Hong Kong Football Club Stadium

28 May 2023	(Scotland) Rangers B	1–0	Hong Kong U23 (Hong Kong)	Hong Kong
13:40				Stadium: Hong Kong Football Club Stadium

==== Final ====
28 May 2023	(Singapore) Singapore FC	0–1	Rangers B (Scotland)	Hong Kong
16:33				Stadium: Hong Kong Football Club Stadium

=== Masters Cup ===
The top two teams from each Masters group qualify for the Masters Cup.

==== Semi-Finals ====
28 May 2023	(England) Wallsend Boys Club	1–0	Rio Cricket Associação Atlética (Brazil)	Hong Kong
12:28				Stadium: Hong Kong Football Club Stadium

28 May 2023	(Hong Kong) HKFC Masters	0–1	Ampcontrol Discovery Bay (Hong Kong)	Hong Kong
12:46			Aender	Stadium: Hong Kong Football Club Stadium

==== Final ====
28 May 2023	(England) Wallsend Boys Club	2–1	Ampcontrol Discovery Bay (Hong Kong)	Hong Kong
17:23			Annan	Stadium: Hong Kong Football Club Stadium

=== Masters Plate ===
The third and fourth placed teams in each Masters group compete in the Masters Plate.

==== Semi-Finals ====
28 May 2023	(Singapore) Singapore FC Masters	0–1 (a.e.t.)	Kowloon Cricket Club Veterans (Hong Kong)	Hong Kong
8:30				Stadium: Hong Kong Football Club Stadium

28 May 2023	(United States) Citi All Stars	3–1	HKFC Chairman's Select (Hong Kong)	Hong Kong
8:48				Stadium: Hong Kong Football Club Stadium

==== Final ====
28 May 2023	(Hong Kong) Kowloon Cricket Club Veterans	0–1	Citi All Stars (United States)	Hong Kong
13:00				Stadium: Hong Kong Football Club Stadium
