= 2025 HKFC Soccer Sevens =

Tournament details
- Country: Hong Kong
- Dates: 16–18 May 2025
- Teams: 16

Final positions
- Champions: (Netherlands) Jong AZ
- Runners-up: (England) Brighton & Hove Albion U21

2025 HKFC Soccer Sevens, officially known as The HKFC Standard Chartered Soccer Sevens due to sponsorship reasons, was the 22nd edition of the HKFC Soccer Sevens tournament.

== Competing Teams ==
The competing teams were announced on 14 March 2025, ahead of the draw for the tournament which took place on 9 April 2025.

=== Men's Tournament ===
==== Group A ====
- (England) Aston Villa U21: (England) Sam Lewis, (Norway) Ethan Amundsen-Day, (Wales) Thierry Katsukunya, (Colombia) Yeimar Mosquera, (England) Travis Patterson, (England) Charlie Pavey, (Scotland) Ewan Simpson, (England) I-Lani Edwards, (England) Kyrie Pierre, (England) Todd Alcock
- (Australia) Western United Youth: (Australia) Alex Nassiep, (Australia) Anthony Didulica, (Australia) Besian Kutleshi, (Australia) Harry Casci, (Scotland) James York, (Australia) Khoder Kaddour, (New Zealand) Luka Coveny, (Australia) Mark Leonard, (Australia) Tobias Servin, (Australia) Victor Muhindo
- Macau National Team: Lei Wa Si Vaselie, Marcos Cheong, Kam Chi Hou, Leong Wai Hin, Leong Hou In, Ng Tai Lin, Ieong Lek Hang, Leung Chi Seng, Cheong Hoi San, Lei Cheng Lam
- (Hong Kong) HKFC Captain's Select: (Hong Kong) James Wright, (Hong Kong) Wong Sum Chit, (Hong Kong) Roger Guillaume, (South Korea) Shin Jae Ho, (Scotland) Marcus McMillan, (Northern Ireland) Stuart Muldrew, (United States) Auston Kranick, (Hong Kong) Zanskar Blair, (Hong Kong) Daniel Man, (Hong Kong) Li Chung Hang

==== Group B ====
- (England) Leicester City U21: (England) Harry French, (England) Jayden Joseph, (England) Mirsad Ali, (England) Henry Cartwright, (England) Kevon Gray, (England) Tommy Neale, (England) Amani Richards, (Wales) Logan Briggs, (Wales) Chris Popov, (England) Alfie Fisken
- (Netherlands) Jong AZ: (Netherlands) Kiyani Zeggen, (Netherlands) Tristan Kuijsten, (Netherlands) Kiani Inge, (Netherlands) Mathijs Menu, (Netherlands) Jeremiah Esajas, (Netherlands) Jorn Berkhout, (Ukraine) Bohdan Budko, (Netherlands) Job Kalisvaart, (Netherlands) Julian Oerip, (Netherlands) Sem van Duijn, (Netherlands) Anthony Smits
- Hong Kong U22: Poon Sheung Hei, Jim Ho Chun, Law Cheuk Hei, Tang In Chim, Chan Ho Ka, Tsang Chun Hin, Tong Wan Hei, Jovan Choi , Ho Tung Lam, Luis Gabor Salzmann
- Hong Kong FC: (England) Freddie Toomer, Lam Ho Hei, (Denmark) Jonas Kongsdal, Toby Down, (Costa Rica) Felix Perez-Doyle, (Australia) Jack Bennie, (England) Callum Beattie, (Scotland) Daniel Scally, (Scotland) Cai McGunnigle, (England) Nicholas Kedwards.

==== Group C ====
- (England) Brighton & Hove Albion U21: (Australia) Steven Hall, (England) Zane Albarus, (England) Shane Nti, (England) Nehemiah Oriola, (Republic of Ireland) Jamie Mullins, (Wales) Joe Belmont, (Tunisia) Samy Chouchane, (Republic of Ireland) Jacob Slater, (England) Joe Knight, (England) Charlie Penman
- (Japan) Yokohama F. Marinos U21
- Singapore FC
- (Hong Kong) Yau Yee League Select: Liam Grant, Louie Langston, Oliver Rossiter, Alastair Thompson, Jimmy Brown, Daniel Morrison, Nying Babouccar, Ousmane Ly, Jareth Ashbrook, Osel Thakuri, Oscar Edward, Martin Middleton

==== Group D ====
- (England) West Ham United U21: (England) Mason Terry, (England) Jethro Medine, (England) Luis Brown, (England) Tyron Akpata, (Northern Ireland) Joshua Briggs, (England) Ryan Battrum, (Republic of Ireland) Sean Moore, (England) Bradley Dolaghan, (Scotland) Josh Landers, (England) Daniel Rigge
- (Northern Ireland) Larne U21: (Northern Ireland) Daniel Collett, (Northern Ireland) James Simpson, (Northern Ireland) Callum Cowan, (Northern Ireland) Logan Wallace, (Northern Ireland) Josh Kee, (Northern Ireland) Oisin Devlin, (Northern Ireland) Ross Ferguson, (Northern Ireland) Jack Hastings, (Northern Ireland) Benji Magee, (Northern Ireland) Ben Napier
- (Hong Kong) Biu Chun Rangers: (Hong Kong) Zhou Ha Yiu, (Hong Kong) Lee Ching, (Hong Kong) Cheung Chin Wang George, (Hong Kong) Wong To Lam Vito, (Hong Kong) Ma Yung Sung, (United States) Sebastian Nicot, (Hong Kong) Leung Hoi Chun, (Hong Kong) Chang Kwong Yin, (South Korea) Kang Hyun, (Hong Kong) Milos del Rosario Wong.
- Singapore Cricket Club

=== Women's Tournament ===
The Women's Tournament featured overseas teams for the first time. The women's tournament consists of one group, with the top two teams qualifying for the final.

- Hong Kong FC
- (Hong Kong) TSL
- (Hong Kong) Kitchee
- (Wales) Wrexham: (England) Chloe Ankers, (Wales) Grace Morris, (Wales) Leah Burke, (Wales) Lili Jones, (Wales) Ava Suckley, (Wales) Erin Lovett, (Wales) Mia Roberts, (Wales) Annie Collins, (Wales) Seren Cashen, (England) Bella Devereux
- (Thailand) Chonburi
- (Singapore) Eastern Thunder

=== Master's Tournament ===
==== Group A ====
- Singapore FC Masters
- (Hong Kong) Kowloon Cricket Club Veterans
- (Hong Kong) HKFC Chairman's Select
- Singapore Cricket Club Masters

==== Group B ====
- (Hong Kong) Wallsend Boys Club HK
- (Hong Kong) Ampcontrol Discovery Bay
- (Hong Kong) HKFC Masters
- (Hong Kong) Yau Yee League All Stars

== Main Tournament - Group Stage ==
The group stage fixtures were announced on 8 May 2025.

All times are Hong Kong Time (UTC+8)

=== Group A ===
Team	Pld	W	D	L	GF	GA	GD	Pts
(England) Aston Villa U21	3	3	0	0	9	0	+9	9
(Australia) Western United Youth	3	2	0	1	3	4	−1	6
(Hong Kong) HKFC Captain's Select	3	1	0	2	1	3	−2	3
Macau National Team	3	0	0	3	0	6	−6	0

Updated to match(es) played on 17 May 2025. Source:

17 May 2025	(Australia) Western United Youth	2–0	HKFC Captain's Select (Hong Kong)	Hong Kong
16:35				Stadium: Hong Kong Football Club Stadium

17 May 2025	(England) Aston Villa U21	4–0	Macau National Team	Hong Kong
16:52				Stadium: Hong Kong Football Club Stadium

17 May 2025	(England) Aston Villa U21	1–0	HKFC Captain's Select (Hong Kong)	Hong Kong
18:17				Stadium: Hong Kong Football Club Stadium

17 May 2025	(Australia) Western United Youth	1–0	Macau National Team	Hong Kong
18:34				Stadium: Hong Kong Football Club Stadium

17 May 2025	(England) Aston Villa U21	4–0	Western United Youth (Australia)	Hong Kong
19:59				Stadium: Hong Kong Football Club Stadium

17 May 2025	Macau National Team	0–1	HKFC Captain's Select (Hong Kong)	Hong Kong
20:16				Stadium: Hong Kong Football Club Stadium

=== Group B ===
Team	Pld	W	D	L	GF	GA	GD	Pts
Hong Kong FC	3	3	0	0	5	1	+4	9
(Netherlands) Jong AZ	3	2	0	1	5	2	+3	6
(England) Leicester City U21	3	1	0	2	4	4	0	3
Hong Kong U22	3	0	0	3	1	8	−7	0

Updated to match(es) played on 17 May 2025. Source:

17 May 2025	(Netherlands) Jong AZ	2–0	Hong Kong U22	Hong Kong
10:12				Stadium: Hong Kong Football Club Stadium

17 May 2025	(England) Leicester City U21	0–1	Hong Kong FC	Hong Kong
10:29				Stadium: Hong Kong Football Club Stadium

17 May 2025	(Netherlands) Jong AZ	0–1	Hong Kong FC	Hong Kong
11:54				Stadium: Hong Kong Football Club Stadium

17 May 2025	(England) Leicester City U21	3–0	Hong Kong U22	Hong Kong
12:11				Stadium: Hong Kong Football Club Stadium

17 May 2025	(England) Leicester City U21	1–3	Jong AZ (Netherlands)	Hong Kong
13:53				Stadium: Hong Kong Football Club Stadium

17 May 2025	Hong Kong U22	1–3	Hong Kong FC	Hong Kong
14:10				Stadium: Hong Kong Football Club Stadium

=== Group C ===
Team	Pld	W	D	L	GF	GA	GD	Pts
(Japan) Yokohama F. Marinos U21	3	3	0	0	5	0	+5	9
(England) Brighton & Hove Albion U21	3	2	0	1	4	1	+3	6
(Hong Kong) Yau Yee League Select	3	0	1	2	1	3	−2	1
Singapore FC	3	0	1	2	1	7	−6	1

Updated to match(es) played on 17 May 2025. Source:

17 May 2025	(Japan) Yokohama F. Marinos U21	3–0	Singapore FC	Hong Kong
16:01				Stadium: Hong Kong Football Club Stadium

17 May 2025	(England) Brighton & Hove Albion U21	1–0	Yau Yee League Select (Hong Kong)	Hong Kong
16:18				Stadium: Hong Kong Football Club Stadium

17 May 2025	(England) Brighton & Hove Albion U21	3–0	Singapore FC	Hong Kong
17:43				Stadium: Hong Kong Football Club Stadium

17 May 2025	(Japan) Yokohama F. Marinos U21	1–0	Yau Yee League Select (Hong Kong)	Hong Kong
18:00				Stadium: Hong Kong Football Club Stadium

17 May 2025	Singapore FC	1–1	Yau Yee League Select (Hong Kong)	Hong Kong
19:25				Stadium: Hong Kong Football Club Stadium

17 May 2025	(England) Brighton & Hove Albion U21	0–1	Yokohama F. Marinos U21 (Japan)	Hong Kong
19:42				Stadium: Hong Kong Football Club Stadium

=== Group D ===
Team	Pld	W	D	L	GF	GA	GD	Pts
(Northern Ireland) Larne U21	3	2	1	0	3	1	+2	7
(England) West Ham United U21	3	1	2	0	5	2	+3	5
Singapore Cricket Club	3	0	2	1	1	2	−1	2
(Hong Kong) Biu Chun Rangers	3	0	1	2	2	6	−4	1

Updated to match(es) played on 17 May 2025. Source:

17 May 2025	(Northern Ireland) Larne U21	1–0	Biu Chun Rangers (Hong Kong)	Hong Kong
09:38				Stadium: Hong Kong Football Club Stadium

17 May 2025	(England) West Ham United U21	0–0	Singapore Cricket Club	Hong Kong
09:55				Stadium: Hong Kong Football Club Stadium

17 May 2025	(Northern Ireland) Larne U21	1–0	Singapore Cricket Club	Hong Kong
11:20				Stadium: Hong Kong Football Club Stadium

17 May 2025	(England) West Ham United U21	4–1	Biu Chun Rangers (Hong Kong)	Hong Kong
11:37				Stadium: Hong Kong Football Club Stadium

17 May 2025	(Hong Kong) Biu Chun Rangers	1–1	Singapore Cricket Club	Hong Kong
13:19				Stadium: Hong Kong Football Club Stadium

17 May 2025	(England) West Ham United U21	1–1	Larne U21 (Northern Ireland)	Hong Kong
13:36				Stadium: Hong Kong Football Club Stadium

== Women's Tournament - Group Stage ==
Team	Pld	W	D	L	GF	GA	GD	Pts
(Hong Kong) Kitchee	5	3	2	0	4	1	+3	11
(Wales) Wrexham	5	2	3	0	3	1	+2	9
(Hong Kong) TSL	5	2	2	1	7	3	+4	8
(Thailand) Chonburi	5	2	0	3	5	7	−2	6
(Singapore) Eastern Thunder	5	0	3	2	2	4	−2	3
Hong Kong FC	5	0	2	3	2	8	−6	2

Updated to match(es) played on 17 May 2025. Source:

16 May 2025	Hong Kong FC	0–2	TSL (Hong Kong)	Hong Kong
17:30				Stadium: Hong Kong Football Club Stadium

16 May 2025	(Singapore) Eastern Thunder	1–1	Kitchee (Hong Kong)	Hong Kong
17:48				Stadium: Hong Kong Football Club Stadium

16 May 2025	(Thailand) Chonburi	0–1	Wrexham (Wales)	Hong Kong
18:06		Report	Morris	Stadium: Hong Kong Football Club Stadium

16 May 2025	Hong Kong FC	0–1	Kitchee (Hong Kong)	Hong Kong
19:00				Stadium: Hong Kong Football Club Stadium

16 May 2025	(Thailand) Chonburi	1–4	TSL (Hong Kong)	Hong Kong
19:18				Stadium: Hong Kong Football Club Stadium

16 May 2025	(Singapore) Eastern Thunder	0–1	Wrexham (Wales)	Hong Kong
19:36		Report	Suckley	Stadium: Hong Kong Football Club Stadium

16 May 2025	(Hong Kong) Kitchee	1–0	Chonburi (Thailand)	Hong Kong
20:30				Stadium: Hong Kong Football Club Stadium

16 May 2025	Hong Kong FC	1–1	Eastern Thunder (Singapore)	Hong Kong
20:48				Stadium: Hong Kong Football Club Stadium

17 May 2025	(Hong Kong) TSL	0–1	Kitchee (Hong Kong)	Hong Kong
09:04				Stadium: Hong Kong Football Club Stadium

17 May 2025	(Thailand) Chonburi	1–0	Eastern Thunder (Singapore)	Hong Kong
09:21				Stadium: Hong Kong Football Club Stadium

17 May 2025	(Wales) Wrexham	0–0	Hong Kong FC	Hong Kong
11:03		Report		Stadium: Hong Kong Football Club Stadium

17 May 2025	(Wales) Wrexham	1–1	TSL (Hong Kong)	Hong Kong
12:45	Suckley	Report	Leung Hong Kiu Anke (pen.)	Stadium: Hong Kong Football Club Stadium

17 May 2025	(Thailand) Chonburi	3–1	Hong Kong FC	Hong Kong
13:02				Stadium: Hong Kong Football Club Stadium

17 May 2025	(Singapore) Eastern Thunder	0–0	TSL (Hong Kong)	Hong Kong
14:27				Stadium: Hong Kong Football Club Stadium

17 May 2025	(Wales) Wrexham	0–0	Kitchee (Hong Kong)	Hong Kong
14:44		Report		Stadium: Hong Kong Football Club Stadium

== Masters Tournament - Group Stage ==
=== Group A ===
Team	Pld	W	D	L	GF	GA	GD	Pts
(Hong Kong) Kowloon Cricket Club Veterans	3	2	1	0	3	0	+3	7
Singapore FC Masters	3	1	1	1	2	1	+1	4
(Hong Kong) HKFC Chairman's Select	3	1	0	2	1	4	−3	3
Singapore Cricket Club Masters	3	0	2	1	0	1	−1	2

Updated to match(es) played on 17 May 2025. Source:

16 May 2025	(Hong Kong) HKFC Chairman's Select	1–0	Singapore Cricket Club Masters	Hong Kong
18:24				Stadium: Hong Kong Football Club Stadium

16 May 2025	(Hong Kong) Kowloon Cricket Club Veterans	1–0	Singapore FC Masters	Hong Kong
19:54				Stadium: Hong Kong Football Club Stadium

17 May 2025	(Hong Kong) Kowloon Cricket Club Veterans	0–0	Singapore Cricket Club Masters	Hong Kong
08:30				Stadium: Hong Kong Football Club Stadium

17 May 2025	Singapore FC Masters	2–0	HKFC Chairman's Select (Hong Kong)	Hong Kong
08:47				Stadium: Hong Kong Football Club Stadium

17 May 2025	(Hong Kong) Kowloon Cricket Club Veterans	2–0	HKFC Chairman's Select (Hong Kong)	Hong Kong
10:46				Stadium: Hong Kong Football Club Stadium

17 May 2025	Singapore FC Masters	0–0	Singapore Cricket Club Masters	Hong Kong
12:28				Stadium: Hong Kong Football Club Stadium

=== Group B ===
Team	Pld	W	D	L	GF	GA	GD	Pts
(Hong Kong) Ampcontrol Discovery Bay	3	3	0	0	4	0	+4	9
(Hong Kong) Wallsend Boys Club HK	3	1	1	1	2	3	−1	4
(Hong Kong) HKFC Masters	3	1	0	2	2	2	0	3
(Hong Kong) Yau Yee League All Stars	3	0	1	2	1	4	−3	1

Updated to match(es) played on 17 May 2025. Source:

16 May 2025	(Hong Kong) Wallsend Boys Club HK	0–2	Ampcontrol Discovery Bay (Hong Kong)	Hong Kong
18:42				Stadium: Hong Kong Football Club Stadium

16 May 2025	(Hong Kong) HKFC Masters	2–0	Yau Yee League All Stars (Hong Kong)	Hong Kong
20:12				Stadium: Hong Kong Football Club Stadium

17 May 2025	(Hong Kong) Yau Yee League All Stars	1–1	Wallsend Boys Club HK (Hong Kong)	Hong Kong
17:09				Stadium: Hong Kong Football Club Stadium

17 May 2025	(Hong Kong) Ampcontrol Discovery Bay	1–0	HKFC Masters (Hong Kong)	Hong Kong
17:26				Stadium: Hong Kong Football Club Stadium

17 May 2025	(Hong Kong) Ampcontrol Discovery Bay	1–0	Yau Yee League All Stars (Hong Kong)	Hong Kong
18:51				Stadium: Hong Kong Football Club Stadium

17 May 2025	(Hong Kong) Wallsend Boys Club HK	1–0	HKFC Masters (Hong Kong)	Hong Kong
19:08				Stadium: Hong Kong Football Club Stadium

== Final Stage ==
=== Main Cup ===
The top two teams from each group qualify for the Main Cup.

==== Quarter-Finals ====
18 May 2025	(England) Aston Villa U21	1–2	Brighton & Hove Albion U21 (England)	Hong Kong
10:18				Stadium: Hong Kong Football Club Stadium

18 May 2025	(Japan) Yokohama F. Marinos U21	2–2 (a.e.t.) (5–3 p)	Western United Youth (Australia)	Hong Kong
10:43				Stadium: Hong Kong Football Club Stadium

18 May 2025	Hong Kong FC	1–2	West Ham United U21 (England)	Hong Kong
11:08				Stadium: Hong Kong Football Club Stadium

18 May 2025	(Northern Ireland) Larne U21	0–3	Jong AZ (Netherlands)	Hong Kong
11:33				Stadium: Hong Kong Football Club Stadium

==== Semi-Finals ====
18 May 2025	(England) Brighton & Hove Albion U21	0–0 (a.e.t.) (3–2 p)	West Ham United U21 (England)	Hong Kong
15:06				Stadium: Hong Kong Football Club Stadium

18 May 2025	(Japan) Yokohama F. Marinos U21	1–2	Jong AZ (Netherlands)	Hong Kong
15:31				Stadium: Hong Kong Football Club Stadium

==== Final ====
18 May 2025
18:46

(England) Brighton & Hove Albion U21	0–1 (a.e.t.)	Jong AZ (Netherlands)
		Zeggen

Hong Kong Football Club Stadium, Hong Kong

=== Main Shield ===
The losing quarter-finalists from the Main Cup compete in the Main Shield.

==== Semi-Finals ====
18 May 2025	(England) Aston Villa U21	1–2	Hong Kong FC	Hong Kong
14:16				Stadium: Hong Kong Football Club Stadium

18 May 2025	(Australia) Western United Youth	4–1	Larne U21 (Northern Ireland)	Hong Kong
14:41				Stadium: Hong Kong Football Club Stadium

==== Final ====
18 May 2025
17:31

Hong Kong FC	0–2	Western United Youth (Australia)
		Didulica; Casci

Hong Kong Football Club Stadium, Hong Kong

=== Main Plate ===
The third and fourth placed teams from each group compete in the Main Plate.

==== Quarter-Finals ====
18 May 2025	(Hong Kong) HKFC Captain's Select	2–0	Singapore FC	Hong Kong
09:06				Stadium: Hong Kong Football Club Stadium

18 May 2025	(Hong Kong) Yau Yee League Select	0–0 (a.e.t.) (1–0 p)	Macau National Team	Hong Kong
09:24				Stadium: Hong Kong Football Club Stadium

18 May 2025	(England) Leicester City U21	0–1	Biu Chun Rangers (Hong Kong)	Hong Kong
09:42				Stadium: Hong Kong Football Club Stadium

18 May 2025	Singapore Cricket Club	1–2	Hong Kong U22	Hong Kong
10:00				Stadium: Hong Kong Football Club Stadium

==== Semi-Finals ====
18 May 2025	(Hong Kong) HKFC Captain's Select	2–0	Biu Chun Rangers (Hong Kong)	Hong Kong
13:40				Stadium: Hong Kong Football Club Stadium

18 May 2025	(Hong Kong) Yau Yee League Select	1–1 (a.e.t.) (3–2 p)	Hong Kong U22	Hong Kong
13:58				Stadium: Hong Kong Football Club Stadium

==== Final ====
18 May 2025
17:06

(Hong Kong) HKFC Captain's Select	1–0	Yau Yee League Select (Hong Kong)
Shin

Hong Kong Football Club Stadium, Hong Kong

=== Women's Cup Final ===
The top two teams from the Women's group qualify for the Cup Final

18 May 2025
17:56

(Hong Kong) Kitchee	1–0	Wrexham (Wales)
Cheung Wai Ki	Report

Hong Kong Football Club Stadium, Hong Kong

=== Women's Shield Final ===
The top 3rd and 4th placed teams from the Women's group qualify for the Shield Final

18 May 2025
16:41

(Hong Kong) TSL	0–0 (a.e.t.)	Chonburi (Thailand)
Penalties
Sang-Lai Mae (penalty scored); Mitsusamdesh (penalty scored); Woo-Chu Yo (penalty scored); Iko (penalty scored); Shun (penalty scored)	5–4	Siwangsri (penalty scored); Thsukkasu (penalty scored); Gonggmen (penalty scored); Choohuwan (penalty scored); Changwon (penalty missed)

Hong Kong Football Club Stadium, Hong Kong

=== Women's Plate Final ===
The 5th and 6th placed teams in each Women's group compete in the Women's Plate Final.

18 May 2025
13:22

(Singapore) Eastern Thunder	0–0 (a.e.t.)	Hong Kong FC
Penalties
Sin (penalty scored); May (penalty missed)	1–2	Tan (penalty scored); Downe (penalty scored)

Hong Kong Football Club Stadium, Hong Kong

=== Masters Cup ===
The top two teams from each Masters group qualify for the Masters Cup.

==== Semi-Finals ====
18 May 2025	(Hong Kong) Kowloon Cricket Club Veterans	0–3	Wallsend Boys Club HK (Hong Kong)	Hong Kong
12:28				Stadium: Hong Kong Football Club Stadium

18 May 2025	Singapore FC Masters	1–2 (a.e.t.)	Ampcontrol Discovery Bay (Hong Kong)	Hong Kong
12:46				Stadium: Hong Kong Football Club Stadium

==== Final ====
18 May 2025
18:21

(Hong Kong) Wallsend Boys Club HK	0–3	(Hong Kong) Ampcontrol Discovery Bay
		Zhei; Annan; Cuaigo

Hong Kong Football Club Stadium, Hong Kong

=== Masters Plate ===
The third and fourth placed teams in each Masters group compete in the Masters Plate.

==== Semi-Finals ====
18 May 2025	(Hong Kong) HKFC Chairman's Select	0–0 (a.e.t.) (4–5 p)	Yau Yee League All Stars (Hong Kong)	Hong Kong
08:30				Stadium: Hong Kong Football Club Stadium

18 May 2025	Singapore Cricket Club Masters	0–2	HKFC Masters (Hong Kong)	Hong Kong
08:48				Stadium: Hong Kong Football Club Stadium

==== Final ====
18 May 2025
13:04

(Hong Kong) Yau Yee League All Stars	1–1 (a.e.t.)	HKFC Masters (Hong Kong)
Scott		Masielle
Penalties
Lee (penalty missed); Bailey (penalty missed)	0–1	McArdle (penalty missed); Boa Morte (penalty scored)

Hong Kong Football Club Stadium, Hong Kong
