= HKFC Soccer Sevens =

- Founded: 1999
- Teams: 16 Main, 10 Masters
- Current champions: (England) Brighton & Hove Albion
- Most championships: (England) Aston Villa (7 titles)
- Website: www.hksoccersevens.com
- 2026

The HKFC Soccer Sevens or Hong Kong Soccer Sevens, known as the HKFC Standard Chartered Soccer Sevens for sponsorship purposes, is an annual invitational seven-a-side football tournament which is organised and hosted by Hong Kong Football Club. Held since 1999, many young professional players have made a name for themselves in the tournament.

The competition ran from 1999 to 2019, with a break due to the SARS outbreak in Hong Kong in 2003. In 2020, the organisers confirmed that the competition would not be happening that year due to the ongoing issues in Hong Kong - promising to be back in 2021, but this did not happen with the tournament's website going offline. In 2023, the organisers confirmed that the competition would return after a four-year hiatus.

In 2024, the organisers announced that a women's edition of the tournament would take place alongside the men's.

== Format ==
- The event features two competitions, a Main Tournament and Masters Tournament. The 16-team Main Tournament is open age group (players must be at least 16) and features mostly youth and academy teams from clubs in Europe playing against more senior players from leagues around Asia.
- The 10-team Masters Tournament is for players aged 35 and over and features former players from Europe's top leagues. Players such as Jürgen Klinsmann, John Barnes, Andy Cole, Matt Le Tissier, Des Walker, Didier Six, Mustapha Hadji, Peter Beardsley, Craig Armstrong, David Johnson, Des Lyttle, Jason Lee, and Michael Thomas have competed in this category.
- Each game has two seven-minute halves with a one-minute half-time break, while the finals are 10 minutes each half with a three-minute break at half-time.
- There are two stages: the group stage followed by the knockout stage. In the Main group stage, teams compete within four groups of four teams each. Each group plays a round-robin tournament, in which each team is scheduled for three matches against other teams in the same group. The top two teams from each group advance to the Cup knockout stage while the bottom two advance to the Plate knockout stage. In the Masters Tournament, the 12 teams are split into three groups of four teams.
- The knockout stage is a single-elimination tournament in which teams play each other in one-off matches, with penalty shootouts and sudden death used to decide the winner if necessary. It begins with the quarter-finals in which the third-placed team plays against the fourth-placed team in Plate and the winner of each group plays against the runner-up of another group in Cup. This is followed by the semi-finals and the final.
- The Main Tournament has an additional Shield competition which is contested by the four losing teams of the Cup quarter-finals. The Shield is also a single-elimination tournament of similar format. The Cup is regarded as the highest honour, followed by the Shield and Plate.

== Past winners ==
=== Men ===
Season	Title Sponsor	Main Cup	Main Shield	Main Plate	Masters Cup	Player of the Tournament
1999	None	(England) Blackburn Rovers			Carling All Stars	Jon-Paul McGovern
2000	Philips Lighting	(Hong Kong) Instant Dict			Lorenz All Stars	Leon Knight
2001	Philips Lighting	(England) Arsenal			Instant Dict Veterans	Liam Chilvers
2002	Philips Lighting	(England) Aston Villa			Philips All Stars	Jonathan Bewers
2003	Not Held due to SARS outbreak					
2004	Philips Lighting	(England) Aston Villa			Philips All Stars	Stephen Cooke
2005	Philips Lighting	(Japan) Urawa Red Diamonds		(Hong Kong) Kitchee	Lorenz All Stars	Sergio Escudero
2006	Philips Lighting	(Japan) Urawa Red Diamonds			Lorenz All Stars	Gabriel Agbonlahor
2007	Philips Lighting	(England) Aston Villa			Lorenz All Stars	Zoltán Stieber
2008	Philips Lighting	(England) Aston Villa	(Japan) Urawa Red Diamonds	(Netherlands) PSV Eindhoven	Rangers Legends	Barry Bannan
2009	IP Global	(Scotland) Celtic	(South Korea) Daejeon Citizen	(England) Birmingham City	Golden Rainbow	Paul McGowan
2010	IP Global	(England) Aston Villa	(Netherlands) Ajax	(England) Eastleigh	Kokusai F.C. Tokyo	Andrew Shinnie
2011	Citibank	(Hong Kong) Kitchee	(South Korea) Daejeon Citizen	(Hong Kong) HKFC Captain's Select	Top Class F.C.	Ubay Luzardo
2012	Citibank	(England) Newcastle United	(England) Leicester City	(England) West Ham United	Aegon AFC All Stars	Daniel Johnson
2013	Citibank	(England) Leicester City	(England) Aston Villa	Hong Kong Rangers	Rangers All Stars	Harry Panayiotou
2014	Citibank	(England) Manchester City	(England) Aston Villa	(England) Leicester City	Aegon Ajax All Stars	Brandon Barker
2015	Citibank	(Spain) Atlético Madrid	Hong Kong Rangers	Hong Kong FC	USRC-BTS	Samuel Sáiz
2016	Citi	(England) Aston Villa	(England) Leicester City	(England) Stoke City	Citi All Stars	Khalid Abdo
2017	Citi	(England) Leicester City	(England) West Ham United	(Germany) Bayer Leverkusen	Citi All Stars	Josh Eppiah
2018	Citi	(England) Newcastle United	(England) Aston Villa	(Australia) Newcastle Jets	Discovery Bay	Víctor Fernández
2019	Citi	(England) Newcastle United	(England) Wolverhampton Wanderers	(England) Aston Villa	Wallsend Boys Club	Elias Sørensen
2020	Not held due to COVID-19 pandemic and ongoing Hong Kong protests					
2021	Not held due to COVID-19 pandemic and ongoing Hong Kong protests					
2022	Not held due to COVID-19 pandemic and ongoing Hong Kong protests					
2023	Citi	(England) Aston Villa	(England) Newcastle United	(Scotland) Rangers	Wallsend Boys Club	Omari Kellyman
2024	Standard Chartered	(England) Brighton & Hove Albion	(England) Leicester City	(Japan) Yokohama F. Marinos	PFA All Stars	Luca Barrington
2025	Standard Chartered	(Netherlands) AZ Alkmaar	(Australia) Western United	(Hong Kong) HKFC Captain's Select	Ampcontrol Discovery Bay	Kiyani Zeggen
2026	Standard Chartered	(England) Brighton & Hove Albion	(England) West Ham United	(Hong Kong) Lee Man	Yau Yee League All Stars	Tyler Silsby

=== Women ===
Year	Title Sponsor	Cup Winner	Shield Winner	Plate Winner	Player of the Tournament
2024	Standard Chartered	(Hong Kong) Chelsea FC Soccer School		Hong Kong FC	Anke Leung
2025	Standard Chartered	(Hong Kong) Kitchee	(Hong Kong) TSL	Hong Kong FC	Cheung Wai Ki
2026	Standard Chartered	(Japan) Urawa Red Diamonds	(Hong Kong) Kitchee	(Singapore) Eastern Thunder	

=== Records ===
Team	Cup Wins	Shield Wins	Plate Wins
(England) Aston Villa	7 (2002, 2004, 2007, 2008, 2010, 2016, 2023)	3 (2013, 2014, 2018)	1 (2019)
(England) Newcastle United	3 (2012, 2018, 2019)	1 (2023)	0
(England) Leicester City	2 (2013, 2017)	3 (2012, 2016, 2024)	1 (2014)
(Japan) Urawa Red Diamonds	2 (2005, 2006)	1 (2008)	0
(England) Brighton & Hove Albion	2 (2024, 2026)	0	0
(Hong Kong) Kitchee	1 (2011)	0	1 (2005)
(England) Arsenal	1 (2001)	0	0
(Spain) Atlético Madrid	1 (2015)	0	0
(Netherlands) AZ Alkmaar	1 (2025)	0	0
(England) Blackburn Rovers	1 (1999)	0	0
(Scotland) Celtic	1 (2009)	0	0
(Hong Kong) Instant Dict	1 (2000)	0	0
(England) Manchester City	1 (2014)	0	0
(England) West Ham United	0	2 (2017, 2026)	1 (2012)
(South Korea) Daejeon Citizen	0	2 (2009, 2011)	0
Hong Kong Rangers	0	1 (2015)	1 (2013)
(Netherlands) Ajax	0	1 (2010)	0
(Australia) Western United	0	1 (2025)	0
(England) Wolverhampton Wanderers	0	1 (2019)	0
(Hong Kong) HKFC Captain's Select	0	0	2 (2011, 2025)
(Germany) Bayer Leverkusen	0	0	1 (2017)
(England) Birmingham City	0	0	1 (2009)
(England) Eastleigh	0	0	1 (2010)
Hong Kong FC	0	0	1 (2015)
(Hong Kong) Lee Man	0	0	1 (2026)
(Australia) Newcastle Jets	0	0	1 (2018)
(Netherlands) PSV Eindhoven	0	0	1 (2008)
(Scotland) Rangers	0	0	1 (2023)
(England) Stoke City	0	0	1 (2016)
(Japan) Yokohama F. Marinos	0	0	1 (2024)
