= 2007 HKFC International Soccer Sevens =

2007 HKFC International Soccer Sevens, officially known as The 2007 HKFC Philips Lighting International Soccer Sevens due to sponsorship reason, is the 8th staging of this competition. It was held on 25–27 May 2007.

== Notable players ==
=== Masters Tournament ===
- Kowloon Cricket Club: John Barnes
- Marseille All Stars: Manuel Amoros, William Ayache, Alain Barataud, Marcel Dib, Craig Foster, Enzo Francescoli (withdrawn), Alain Giresse (withdrawn), Philippe Thys, Pascal Vahirua, Philippe Vercruysse
- Philips Lighting All Stars: Warren Barton, Owen Coyle, Dave Beasant, John Beresford, John Collins, Dean Holdsworth, Rob Lee, Ken Monkou, Paul Walsh, Mark Walters

=== Main Tournament ===
- Arsenal: Wojciech Szczęsny, Gavin Hoyte, Abu Ogogo, Paul Rodgers, Nacer Barazite, James Dunne, Kieran Gibbs, Mark Randall, Jay Simpson, Rene Steer
- Kitchee: Anderson, Chan Siu Ki, Gao Wen, Li Hang Wui, Leung Chi Wing, Liu Quankun, Luk Koon Pong, Jaimes McKee, Tam Siu Wai, Wang Zhenpang
- Tottenham Hotspur: Tommy Forecast, Troy Archibald-Henville, Philip Ifil, Leigh Mills, Jacques Maghoma, Jamie O'Hara, Charlie Daniels, David Hutton, Andy Barcham, Lee Barnard
- South China: Au Wai Lun, Chan Chi Hong, Chan Wai Ho, Cheng Siu Wai, Kwok Kin Pong, Li Haiqiang, Man Pei Tak, Yeung Ching Kwong, Zhang Chunhui
