= 2005 HKFC International Soccer Sevens =

2005 HKFC International Soccer Sevens, officially known as The 2005 HKFC Philips Lighting International Soccer Sevens due to sponsorship reason, is the 6th staging of this competition. It was held on 27–29 May 2005.

Urawa Red Diamonds, beating PSV Eindhoven in the final, was the Cup winner of the Main Tournament. Lorenz All Stars was the Cup winner of the Masters Tournament. Sergio Escudero of Urawa Red Diamonds was awarded the Player of the tournament. Uwe Bein was the Masters Player of the Tournament.

== Results ==
=== Masters Tournament ===
Plate

- Singapore Cricket Club won the Plate competition by beating Southampton All Stars in the final.

Cup

Quarterfinals
TFFC	0
Happy Valley	2
Lorenz All Stars	2
Jade	0
Hong Kong Football Club	1
Yokohama	0
Philips All Stars	2
Team Bondi	0

Semifinals
Happy Valley	0
Lorenz All Stars	4
Hong Kong Football Club	0
Philips All Stars	1

Finals
Lorenz All Stars	3
Philips All Stars	0

=== Main Tournament ===
Plate

- Bottom two teams of each group at the Group Stage entered the Plate competition. Some of the teams include Kitchee, Hong Kong Football Club, City University of Hong Kong and Yau Yee League Select. Kitchee won the Plate by beating Hong Kong Football Club by 2–0 in the final.

Cup

Quarterfinals
Glasgow Celtic	1
Urawa Red Diamonds	2
Aston Villa	0
Happy Valley	1
Manchester United	1
Central Coast Mariners	2
Rangers	0
PSV Eindhoven	1

Semifinals
Urawa Red Diamonds	4
Happy Valley	0
Central Coast Mariners	0
PSV Eindhoven (a.e.t.)	1

Finals
Urawa Red Diamonds	3
PSV Eindhoven	0

== Notable players ==
- Urawa Red Diamonds: Nobuhiro Kato, Yuzo Minami, Eliézio, Takafumi Akahoshi, Shota Arai, Shunsuke Oyama, Sergio Escudero, Koki Otani, Shunsuke Tsutsumi, 萩尾勇真
- Lorenz All Stars: Uwe Bein
- Hong Kong Football Club: Tony Sealy
- Manchester United: Chris Eagles, Tom Heaton, Fraizer Campbell, Phil Bardsley, David Fox, David Jones, Phil Marsh
