= 1935–36 Hong Kong Second Division League =

Football season

Statistics of Hong Kong Second Division League in the 1935/1936 season.

== Overview ==
Royal Navy won the championship.

== League table ==
Pos	Team	Pld	W	D	L	GF	GA	GD	Pts
1	Royal Navy (C)	26	23	2	1	125	27	+98	48
2	Eastern Lancashire Regiment	26	20	3	3	83	26	+57	43
3	Royal Welch Fusiliers	26	15	9	2	89	24	+65	39
4	Royal Ulster Rifles	26	17	4	5	73	31	+42	38
5	Royal Engineers	26	16	2	8	98	46	+52	34
6	RASC & ROSC	26	13	3	10	52	53	−1	29
7	South China	26	13	2	11	46	53	−7	28
8	Chinese AA	26	10	5	11	47	46	+1	25
9	Eastern AA	26	9	5	12	49	63	−14	23
10	Hong Kong FC	26	7	3	16	39	82	−43	17
11	University	26	5	4	17	36	74	−38	14
12	Radio	26	5	1	20	25	88	−63	11
13	Club de Recreio	26	5	0	21	27	67	−40	10
14	Kowloon FC	26	2	1	23	16	125	−109	5

(C) Champions
