= Edward Rowe (footballer) =

English footballer

Personal information
- Full name: Edward James Rowe
- Date of birth: 17 October 2003 (age 23)
- Place of birth: Leamington Spa, England
- Position: Midfielder

Team information
- Current team: Leamington

Youth career
- 2011–2021: Aston Villa

Senior career*
Years	Team	Apps	(Gls)
2021–2024	Aston Villa	0	(0)
2024	→ Gloucester City (loan)	18	(1)
2024-2025	Leamington	13	(0)
2025	Worcester City	9	(0)
2025–2026	Rugby Town	16	(1)
2026-	Bedworth United	1	(0)
- * Club domestic league appearances and goals as of 10:35, 23 March 2026 (UTC)

Edward James Rowe (born 17 October 2003) is an English footballer who plays as a midfielder for Southern League Premier Division Central club Worcester City.

Rowe is a product of the Aston Villa Academy, his only senior appearance was in the FA Cup in 2021.

== Career ==
=== Aston Villa ===
Rowe joined the Aston Villa youth setup at the under-9 level. He was one of several scholars who were fast-tracked into the under-18 squad in July 2020. Rowe appeared three times for Villa's U21 squad in the 2022-23 EFL Trophy campaign.

Rowe was named as part of Villa's Hong Kong Soccer Sevens youth team squad in May 2023, with the team going on to win the main tournament.

On 8 January 2021, Rowe made his first team debut for Aston Villa as a substitute in a FA Cup third round tie against Liverpool, after Villa had been forced to name a team of inexperienced academy players after a COVID-19 outbreak had affected the first team.

On 7 July 2022, Rowe signed his first professional contract with Aston Villa.

==== Gloucester City loan ====
On 12 January 2024, Rowe signed for National League North club Gloucester City on loan until the end of the season. Rowe made his debut the following day, in a 3–0 defeat to Chester. He scored his first goal in senior football on 27 January, in a 4–1 victory over Bishop's Stortford.

On 5 June 2024, it was announced that Rowe would be released by Aston Villa at the end of his contract on 30 June.

=== Leamington ===
In August 2024, Rowe joined newly promoted National League North side Leamington, returning to his hometown club having featured for the club's junior sides. On 12 August 2024, Rowe made his debut for Leamington as a late substitute in a 2–1 league defeat to Buxton.

== Career statistics ==
=== Club ===
As of match played 26 November 2024

Appearances and goals by club, season and competition
Club	Season	League			FA Cup		League Cup		Other		Total	
Club	Season	Division	Apps	Goals	Apps	Goals	Apps	Goals	Apps	Goals	Apps	Goals
Aston Villa	2020–21	Premier League	0	0	1	0	0	0	0	0	1	0
Aston Villa	2021–22	Premier League	0	0	0	0	0	0	0	0	0	0
Aston Villa	2022–23	Premier League	0	0	0	0	0	0	3 (Note: Appearances for Aston Villa U21 in EFL Trophy)	0	3	0
Aston Villa	2023–24	Premier League	0	0	0	0	0	0	3	0	3	0
Gloucester City (loan)	2023–24	National League North	18	1	–		–		0	0	18	1
Leamington	2024–25	National League North	13	0	1	0	–		0	0	14	0
Career total			31	1	2	0	0	0	6	0	39	1

== Honours ==
=== Aston Villa Academy ===
- HKFC International Soccer Sevens: 2023
