= 2006 GFI Hong Kong Tens =

The 2006 GFI Hong Kong Tens was held on 29 and 30 March 2006 at the Hong Kong Football Club in Happy Valley, Hong Kong. New Zealand Metro won the Cup, while the Plate was awarded to the PWC Panthers (Australia). The Bowl was won by the SCB Asian Cavaliers, and the Acorns Rugby Club (Japan) won the Shield.

The tournament featured several notable international players, including former All Black Jonah Lomu.

Held annually as a lead-up event to the Hong Kong Sevens, the Hong Kong Tens is considered one of the premier rugby tens tournaments globally. Rugby tens is a variant of rugby union played with 10 players per side (5 forwards and 5 backs) over two 10-minute halves.

== Results ==
=== Wednesday ===
- Aliens 57 - 0 Acorns Rugby Club
- Irish Vikings 36 - 5 Alvarez & Marshal DeA Tigers
- New Zealand Metro 54 - 0 Standard Chartered Bank Asian Cavaliers
- Sumitomo Tamariva 17 - 5 China Agricultural University
- HSBC New Zealand Legends 44-0 CBRE Club
- WDA Cardiff University 22 - 0 Overseas Old Boys
- PWC International Panthers 47 - 0 Laxton PLA
- Hill & Associates Hong Kong Barbarians 45 - 0 Black Watch
- Aliens 29 - 0 Alvarez & Marshal DeA Tigers
- Irish Vikings 7 -5 Acorns Rugby Club
- New Zealand Metro 78 - 0 China Agricultural University
- Sumitomo Tamariva 12 - 7 Standard Chartered Bank Asian Cavaliers
- HSBC New Zealand Legends 54 - 0 Overseas Old Boys
- WDA Cardiff University 48 - 0 CBRE Club
- PWC International Panthers 59 - 0 Black Watch
- Hill & Associates Hong Kong Barbarians 31 - 0 Laxton PLA
- Acorns Rugby Club 29 - 5 Alvarez & Marshal DeA Tigers
- Standard Chartered Bank Asian Cavaliers 7 - 29 China Agricultural University
- CBRE Club 7 - 15 Overseas Old Boys
- Laxton PLA 26 - 5 Black Watch
- Aliens 26 - 5 Irish Vikings
- New Zealand Metro 66 - 0 Sumitomo Tamariva
- HSBC New Zealand Legends 24 - 5 WDA Cardiff University
- PWC International Panthers 0 - 27 Hill & Associates Hong Kong Barbarians

=== Thursday ===
==== Quarter-finals ====
- Bowl Acorns 19 - 29 Asian Cavaliers
- Bowl Laxton PLA 31 - 10 CBRE Club
- Bowl Overseas Old Boys 17 - 12 Black Watch
- Bowl CAU 5 - 7 DeA Tigers
- Cup Aliens 41 - 7 Tamariva
- Cup HK Barbarians 21 - 0 Cardiff University
- Cup NZ Legends 33 - 7 International Panthers
- Cup NZ Metro 42 - 7 Irish Vikings

==== Semi-finals ====
- Shield Acorns 62 - 0 CBRE Club
- Shield Black Watch 14 - 33 CAU
- Bowl Asian Cavaliers 26 - 19 Laxton PLA
- Bowl Overseas Old Boys 5 - 21 DeA Tigers
- Plate Tamariva 5 - 24 Cardiff University
- PlateInternational Panthers 12 - 7 Irish Vikings
- Cup Aliens 7 - 0 HK Barbarians
- Cup NZ Legends 3 - 12 NZ Metro

==== Finals ====
- Shield Acorns 17 - 7 CAU
- Bowl Asian Cavaliers 21 - 7 DeA Tigers
- Plate Cardiff University 12 - 21 International Panthers
- Cup Aliens 14 - 17 NZ Metro
