= Mick Wardrobe =

English footballer

Personal information
- Full name: Michael Wardrobe
- Date of birth: 24 March 1962 (age 64)
- Place of birth: Newcastle upon Tyne, England
- Position: Striker

Youth career
- Wallsend Boys Club

Senior career*
Years	Team	Apps	(Gls)
1980–1981	Burnley	1	(0)
1981–1983	Stockport County	27	(2)
Total		28	(2)
- * Club domestic league appearances and goals

Michael Wardrobe (born 24 March 1962) is an English former professional footballer who played as a striker. In the 1980s, he played 28 matches in the Football League for Burnley and Stockport County.

He also played non-league football including at Bramhall F.C. and Mossley, where he three appearances in the 1984–85 season.
