= Scotland national under-20 football team =

National under-20 association football team representing Scotland

Scotland Under-20
- Association: Scottish Football Association
- Head coach: Scot Gemmill (2017)
First colours	Second colours

FIFA U-20 World Cup
- Appearances: 3 (first in 1983)
- Best result: Quarter-finals (1983 and 1987)

The Scotland national under-20 football team, controlled by the Scottish Football Association, is Scotland's national under 20 football team and is considered to be a feeder team for the Scotland national football team. The team represents Scotland in international Under 20 competitions such as the FIFA U-20 World Cup.

== History ==
Scotland reached the quarter-finals of the World Youth Championship on two occasions: in 1983, where they lost to eventual winners Poland; and in 1987, when tournament runners-up West Germany won on penalties. The team last played in a competitive tournament in the 2007 FIFA U-20 World Cup, which Scotland qualified for by finishing second in the 2006 UEFA European Under-19 Championship. The team lost all three of their matches at the 2007 finals, against Japan (3–1), Nigeria (2–0), and Costa Rica (2–1).

An under-20 team was selected for the 2017 Toulon Tournament, the first time since 1999 that Scotland had competed. Scotland registered a first ever win against Brazil at any level in the groups. The team finished with the bronze medal, which was the nation's first ever medal in the competition's 45-year history.

== Competitive record ==
=== FIFA World Youth Championship / FIFA U-20 World Cup record ===
Year	Result	GP	W	D*	L	GS	GA
(Tunisia) 1977	did not qualify						
(Japan) 1979	did not qualify						
(Australia) 1981	did not qualify						
(Mexico) 1983	Quarter-final	4	2	0	2	4	3
(Soviet Union) 1985	did not qualify						
(Chile) 1987	Quarter-final	4	1	3	0	6	5
(Saudi Arabia) 1989	did not qualify						
(Portugal) 1991	did not qualify						
(Australia) 1993	did not qualify						
(Qatar) 1995	did not qualify						
(Malaysia) 1997	did not qualify						
(Nigeria) 1999	did not qualify						
(Argentina) 2001	did not qualify						
(United Arab Emirates) 2003	did not qualify						
(Netherlands) 2005	did not qualify						
(Canada) 2007	Group Stage	3	0	0	3	2	7
(Egypt) 2009	did not qualify						
(Colombia) 2011	did not qualify						
(Turkey) 2013	did not qualify						
(New Zealand) 2015	did not qualify						
(South Korea) 2017	did not qualify						
(Poland) 2019	did not qualify						
(Argentina) 2023	did not qualify						
(Chile) 2025	did not qualify						
(Azerbaijan) (Uzbekistan) 2027	did not qualify						
(Armenia) (Georgia (country)) 2029	to be determined						
Total	3/26	11	3	3	5	12	15

=== Other tournaments ===
Year	Competition	Result	GP	W	D*	L	GS	GA	Ref
(Northern Ireland) 2002	Milk Cup Elite Section	3rd place	3	2	0	1	6	3	
(Northern Ireland) 2003	Milk Cup Elite Section	8th place	4	0	1	3	2	6	
(France) 2017	Toulon Tournament	3rd place	5	3	0	2	8	7	

== Players ==
The following squad was selected for a friendly match against Slovakia on 23 May 2025.

No.	Pos.	Player	Date of birth (age)	Caps	Goals	Club
	GK	Ruairidh Adams	10 July 2004 (age 22)	0	0	(Scottish Football Association) Kelty Hearts
	GK	Murray Johnson	13 November 2004 (age 22)	0	0	(Scottish Football Association) Queen of the South
	GK	Liam McFarlane	26 September 2004 (age 22)	0	0	(Scottish Football Association) East Fife
	DF	Connor Allan	10 January 2004 (age 22)	0	0	(Scottish Football Association) Kelty Hearts
	DF	Jeremiah Chilokoa-Mullen	17 June 2004 (age 22)	0	0	(Scottish Football Association) Dunfermline Athletic
	DF	Samuel Cleall-Harding	26 March 2006 (age 20)	0	0	(Scottish Football Association) Dundee United
	DF	Adam Forrester	31 March 2005 (age 21)	0	0	(Scottish Football Association) Heart of Midlothian
	DF	Mitchel Frame	25 January 2006 (age 20)	0	0	(Scottish Football Association) Celtic
	DF	Luke Graham	11 February 2004 (age 22)	0	0	(Scottish Football Association) Falkirk
	DF	Jack Kingdon	16 November 2005 (age 20)	0	0	(The Football Association) Rochdale
	MF	Findlay Curtis	1 October 2006 (age 20)	0	0	(Scottish Football Association) Rangers
	MF	Daniel Kelly	3 October 2005 (age 21)	0	0	(The Football Association) Millwall
	MF	Harrison McMahon	29 January 2006 (age 20)	0	0	(The Football Association) Chelsea
	MF	Dylan Reid	1 March 2005 (age 21)	0	0	(The Football Association) Crystal Palace
	MF	Bailey Rice	4 October 2006 (age 20)	0	0	(Scottish Football Association) Rangers
	MF	David Watson	12 February 2005 (age 21)	0	0	(Scottish Football Association) Kilmarnock
	FW	Jevan Beattie	20 December 2006 (age 19)	0	0	(The Football Association) Sheffield United
	FW	Adedire Mebude	28 May 2004 (age 22)	0	0	(German Football Association) Hamburger SV
	FW	Ryan Oné	26 June 2006 (age 20)	0	0	(The Football Association) Sheffield United
	FW	Miller Thomson	20 July 2004 (age 22)	0	0	(Scottish Football Association) Falkirk
	FW	Bobby Wales	23 June 2005 (age 21)	0	0	(Scottish Football Association) Kilmarnock
	FW	James Wilson	6 March 2007 (age 19)	0	0	(Scottish Football Association) Heart of Midlothian

=== Past squads ===
- 1983 FIFA U-20 World Cup squad
- 1987 FIFA U-20 World Cup squad
- 2007 FIFA U-20 World Cup squad

== Head-to-head record ==
The following table shows Scotland's head-to-head record in the FIFA U-20 World Cup.

Opponent	Pld	W	D	L	GF	GA	GD	Win %
Australia	1	0	0	1	1	2	−1	0.00
Bahrain	1	0	1	0	1	1	+0	0.00
Colombia	1	0	1	0	2	2	+0	0.00
Costa Rica	1	0	0	1	1	2	−1	0.00
East Germany	1	1	0	0	2	1	+1	100.00
Germany	1	0	1	0	1	1	+0	0.00
Japan	1	0	0	1	1	3	−2	0.00
Mexico	1	1	0	0	1	0	+1	100.00
Nigeria	1	0	0	1	0	2	−2	0.00
Poland	1	0	0	1	0	1	−1	0.00
South Korea	1	1	0	0	2	0	+2	100.00
Total	11	3	3	5	12	15	−3	27.27
