= Charlie Wilson-Papps =

English-born Australian soccer player (born 2009)

Personal information
- Full name: Charles Thackray Wilson-Papps
- Date of birth: 13 September 2009 (age 17)
- Place of birth: England
- Height: 1.88 m (6 ft 2 in)
- Position: Goalkeeper

Team information
- Current team: Brighton & Hove Albion (youth)

Youth career
- Sheen Lions FC
- 2023–2024: AFC Wimbledon
- 2024–: Brighton & Hove Albion

International career^{‡}
| Years | Team | Apps | (Gls) |
| 2024 | England futsal | 2 | (0) |
| 2024 | England U15 | 3 | (0) |
| 2025 | Australia U16 | 2 | (0) |
| 2026– | Australia U17 | 9 | (0) |
- ‡ National team caps and goals as of 20 November 2026

Charles Thackray Wilson-Papps (born 13 September 2009) is a soccer player who plays as a goalkeeper for Brighton & Hove Albion's academy. Born in England, he has represented both England and Australia at youth level.

== Club career ==
Wilson-Papps started his career at Sheen Lions FC, and later joined the academy of AFC Wimbledon in 2023. On 19 December 2024, he signed for Brighton & Hove Albion in December 2024, for an undisclosed fee that was reported to be around a "substantial six-figure fee". In July 2026, he signed a scholarship contract with the club, before signing his first professional contract later that year.

On 5 October 2026, The Guardian included Wilson-Papps on their list of the 20 best young footballers in the Premier League.

== International career ==
Wilson-Papps played three matches for the England under-15 national team in February 2024, before swapping his international allegiance to Australia, making two appearances for their under-16 team at the 2025 CFA Team China U-16 Cup in May and June 2025.

On 27 April 2026, Wilson-Papps was called up to the Australia men's national under-17 soccer team for the 2026 AFC U-17 Asian Cup, where he made four appearances as Australia reached the semi-finals. On 26 October, he was included in Australia's squad for the 2026 FIFA U-17 World Cup.

== Futsal career ==
Wilson-Papps made his debut for the England national futsal team in January 2024, where he played in two matches against Scotland and Belgium.

== Personal life ==
Born in England, Wilson-Papps is eligible to represent Australia through his mother. He attended Feltonfleet School in Surrey, before later attending Epsom College.
