= Darius Lane =

American soccer player (born 1981)

Personal information
- Date of birth: October 16, 2007 (age 19)
- Place of birth: United States
- Position: Midfielder

Team information
- Current team: Brighton & Hove Albion
- Number: 55

Youth career
- 2023–: Brighton & Hove Albion

International career
| Years | Team | Apps | (Gls) |
| 2024 | United States U18 | 4 | (0) |

Darius Lane (born October 16, 2007) is an American professional soccer player who plays as a midfielder for the academy of English Premier League club Brighton & Hove Albion.

== Club career ==
Born in the United States, to an American father and French mother, Lane was included in The Guardian’s Next Generation 2024: 20 of the best talents at Premier League clubs series. He signed his first professional contract with Brighton & Hove Albion as a 17 year-old in July 2025.

== International career ==
Lane trained with the USA Olympic team in the summer of 2024, and played with USA U18 that year. He was training with the United States men's national under-20 soccer team the following year.

== Style of play ==
Lane is described as a box-to-box, all-action style central midfielder.

== Career statistics ==
=== Club ===
As of match played 13 October 2026

Appearances and goals by club, season and competition
| Club | Season | League | | | FA Cup | | League Cup | | Other | | Total | |
| Club | Season | Division | Apps | Goals | Apps | Goals | Apps | Goals | Apps | Goals | Apps | Goals |
|---|---|---|---|---|---|---|---|---|---|---|---|---|
| Brighton & Hove Albion U21s | 2026–27 | — | | | | | | | 2 (Note: Appearance(s) in the EFL Trophy) | 0 | 2 | 0 |
| Career total | | | 0 | 0 | 0 | 0 | 0 | 0 | 2 | 0 | 2 | 0 |
