= 2006 HKFC International Soccer Sevens =

2006 HKFC International Soccer Sevens, officially known as The 2006 HKFC Philips Lighting International Soccer Sevens due to sponsorship reason, is the 7th staging of this competition. It was held on 19–21 May 2006.

Urawa Red Diamonds, beating Aston Villa by 1–0 in the final, was the Cup winner of the Main Tournament. Lorenz All Stars was the Cup winner of the Masters Tournament. Gabriel Agbonlahor of Aston Villa was awarded the Player of the tournament.

Some of the participating teams include Happy Valley, Sun Hei, Kitchee, Aston Villa F.C., Kaizer Chiefs, Manchester United F.C., Rangers, Glasgow Celtic, Urawa Red Diamonds and PSV Eindhoven.

== Notable players ==
- Lorenz All-Stars: Uwe Bein, Dean Holdsworth
