= Luca Barrington =

English association football player

Personal information
- Full name: Luca Barrington
- Date of birth: 12 December 2004 (age 21)
- Place of birth: Manchester, England
- Height: 1.79 m (5 ft 10 in)
- Positions: Attacking midfielder; left winger

Team information
- Current team: Hampton & Richmond Borough
- Number: 19

Youth career
- 2011–2022: Manchester City
- 2022–2024: Brighton & Hove Albion

Senior career*
Years	Team	Apps	(Gls)
2024–2025	Brighton & Hove Albion	0	(0)
2024–2025	→ Grimsby Town (loan)	38	(4)
2026	Boston United	11	(1)
2026–	Hampton & Richmond Borough	0	(0)
- * Club domestic league appearances and goals as of 19:37, 16 October 2026 (UTC)

Luca Barrington (born 12 December 2004) is an English footballer who plays as an attacking midfielder or left winger for National League South club Hampton & Richmond Borough.

== Career ==
A product of the Manchester City academy, he joined the club at six years-old. He signed a professional contract with City in the summer of 2022, having scored ten goals in 22 appearances to help them win the Under-18 Premier League during the 2021–22 season.

Barrington signed for the academy of Brighton & Hove Albion in August 2022, agreeing a three-year contract. He began training with the first-team squad during the 2023–24 season. He was included in the Brighton first team match-day squads for Premier League matches in December 2023. In May 2024, Barrington won Player of the Tournament in the 2024 HKFC Soccer Sevens tournament, which Brighton U21s won for the first time. On 6 August 2024, Barrington joined EFL League Two side Grimsby Town on a season-long loan deal. He made his first appearance for the club off the bench in Grimsby's first league match away to Fleetwood Town. Barrington scored his first senior goal in the 3–2 victory over Carlisle United on 28 September 2024.

Barrington joined Boston United on 2 March 2026, after departing the Brighton academy in the summer of 2025.

On 16 October 2026, following his release from Boston United in the summer, Barrington joined National League South side Hampton & Richmond Borough.

== Style of play ==
Described as two footed, and able to impact play from either flank. He was named by English newspaper The Guardian as one of the best first year scholars in the Premier League in October 2021, who also notes his ability to dribble.

== Career statistics ==
As of match played 25 April 2026

Appearances and goals by club, season and competition
Club	Season	League			FA Cup		EFL Cup		Other		Total	
Club	Season	Division	Apps	Goals	Apps	Goals	Apps	Goals	Apps	Goals	Apps	Goals
Brighton & Hove Albion U21	2022–23	—							2 (Note: Appearance(s) in EFL Trophy)	0	2	0
Brighton & Hove Albion U21	2023–24	—							5	1	5	1
Brighton & Hove Albion U21	Total	—							7	1	7	1
Brighton & Hove Albion	2024–25	Premier League	0	0	0	0	0	0	—		0	0
Grimsby Town (loan)	2024–25	League Two	38	4	1	0	2	0	2	0	43	4
Boston United	2025–26	National League	11	1	—		—		—		11	1
Hampton & Richmond Borough	2026–27	National League South	0	0	—		—		0	0	0	0
Career total			49	5	1	0	2	0	9	1	61	6
