= Nehemiah Oriola =

English footballer (born 2007)

Personal information
- Full name: Nehemiah Said Oriola II
- Date of birth: 11 June 2007 (age 19)
- Place of birth: England
- Position: Midfielder • Winger

Team information
- Current team: Brighton & Hove Albion
- Number: 49

Youth career
- –2020: West Ham United
- 2020–2023: Manchester United
- 2023–: Brighton & Hove Albion

Senior career*
Years	Team	Apps	(Gls)
2025–	Brighton & Hove Albion	1	(0)
- * Club domestic league appearances and goals

Nehemiah Said Oriola II (born 11 June 2007) is a professional footballer who plays as a midfielder or winger for the academy of Premier League club Brighton & Hove Albion. Born in England, Oriola has Nigerian and Ghanaian heritage through his parents.

== Early life ==
Oriola was born on 11 June 2007. Born in England, he is of Nigerian descent through his father and Ghanaian descent through his mother. Oriola has two younger siblings, a younger brother and a younger sister.

== Career ==
As a youth player, Oriola joined the youth academy of Premier League side West Ham United. Following his stint there, he joined the youth academy of Premier League side Manchester United at the age of thirteen.

During September 2023, Oriola joined the youth academy of Premier League side Brighton & Hove Albion.

== Style of play ==
Oriola plays as a midfielder or winger. English news website SussexWorld wrote in 2025 that he is "left winger by trade... [and] can also play on the right or in attacking midfield".

== Career statistics ==
As of match played 13 October 2026

Appearances and goals by club, season and competition
Club	Season	League			FA Cup		EFL Cup		Other		Total	
Club	Season	Division	Apps	Goals	Apps	Goals	Apps	Goals	Apps	Goals	Apps	Goals
Brighton & Hove Albion U21	2025–26	—							1 (Note: Appearance(s) in EFL Trophy)	0	1	0
Brighton & Hove Albion U21	2026–27	—							2	0	2	0
Brighton & Hove Albion U21	Total		—						3	0	3	0
Brighton & Hove Albion	2025–26	Premier League	1	0	0	0	0	0	—		1	0
Career total			1	0	0	0	0	0	3	0	4	0
