= Alex Chin =

Hong Kong footballer

Personal information
- Full name: Alex Palelei Chin
- Date of birth: 3 February 2000 (age 26)
- Place of birth: Hong Kong
- Height: 1.77 m (5 ft 10 in)
- Position: Goalkeeper

Youth career
- Eastern
- Eastern District
- 2017–2018: Tai Po

Senior career*
Years	Team	Apps	(Gls)
2018–2020	Tai Po	1	(0)
2020–2023	South China	28	(0)
2023–2024	Tai Po	0	(0)
2024–2025	WSE	10	(0)
2025–	Qi Yi	0	(0)
- * Club domestic league appearances and goals as of 16 May 2026

Alex Chin (Chinese: 錢兆琛; born 3 February 2000) is a Hong Kong professional footballer who plays as a goalkeeper and is currently a free agent.

== Club career ==
Chin started his professional career with Hong Kong Premier League club Tai Po.

On 7 November 2020, Chin signed with Hong Kong First Division club South China.

On 19 July 2023, Chin returned to Tai Po after 3 years.

== International career ==
Chin is eligible to represent Tonga internationally through his mother.
