= Omari Kellyman =

English footballer (born 2005)

Personal information
- Full name: Omari Jamian Kellyman
- Date of birth: 15 September 2005 (age 21)
- Place of birth: Derby, England
- Height: 1.91 m (6 ft 3 in)
- Position: Attacking midfielder

Team information
- Current team: Strasbourg
- Number: 26

Youth career
- 2012–2022: Derby County
- 2022–2023: Aston Villa

Senior career*
| Years | Team | Apps | (Gls) |
| 2023–2024 | Aston Villa | 2 | (0) |
| 2024–2026 | Chelsea | 0 | (0) |
| 2025–2026 | → Cardiff City (loan) | 36 | (11) |
| 2026– | Strasbourg | 1 | (0) |

International career^{‡}
| 2021 | Northern Ireland U17 | 3 | (2) |
| 2022 | Northern Ireland U18 | 3 | (0) |
| 2023–2024 | England U19 | 7 | (0) |
- * Club domestic league appearances and goals as of 22:08, 11 November 2026 (UTC) ‡ National team caps and goals as of 08:41, 14 June 2024 (UTC)

Omari Jamian Kellyman (born 15 September 2005) is an English professional footballer who plays as an attacking midfielder for Ligue 1 club Strasbourg.

Kellyman was a product of the Derby County and Aston Villa academies, making his professional debut at the latter in August 2023. Having broken into the senior Aston Villa side in the 2023–24 season, he subsequently signed for Chelsea in June 2024.

Born in England, he has represented both England and Northern Ireland at youth international level.

== Early life ==
Kellyman was born in Derby, England, to a mother from Northern Ireland and a Ghanaian father. As a child he attended the Landau Forte College.

== Club career ==
=== Derby County ===
Kellyman joined the academy of Derby County in 2012, and progressed through the club's academy, being named on the bench for an EFL Championship game against AFC Bournemouth on 21 November 2021, though he did not feature.

=== Aston Villa ===
In March 2022, after ten years with Derby County, he joined the academy of Premier League side Aston Villa, with the club reportedly paying £600,000 in compensation. He signed his first professional contract in September of the same year, having already featured for the under-21 side in the EFL Trophy, with academy manager Mark Harrison stating that the club were "delighted" that he had signed, and that they were "very pleased with his development so far".

The following year, he was nominated for the Premier League 2's Player of the Month award for February, following stellar performances for Aston Villa's youth team. He scored Aston Villa's only goal in a 3–1 friendly loss to Bristol Rovers on 24 March 2023, before helping Aston Villa to the 2023 HKFC International Soccer Sevens title, scoring twice in a 3–0 win in the final against Tai Po and being named Player of the Tournament.

Kellyman was named as part of the Aston Villa senior squad's pre-season squad, including a tour of the USA, in July 2023 and played in their Premier League Summer Series match against Newcastle United. Having started the match on the bench he was brought on in the second half; his shot hitting the post and rebounding resulted in a tap-in goal for Emi Buendía.

On 31 August 2023, Kellyman made his professional debut in a 3–0 UEFA Europa Conference League victory over Hibernian, providing an assist for Leon Bailey's goal. On 25 October 2023, Kellyman signed a new "long-term" contract at Aston Villa. On 7 November 2023, Kellyman suffered a hamstring injury whilst playing for Aston Villa U21s in the EFL Trophy against Crawley Town, which was estimated to sideline him until the new year.

On 3 April 2024, Kellyman made his Premier League debut, in a 4–1 away defeat to Manchester City.

=== Chelsea and loan to Cardiff City ===
On 29 June 2024, Kellyman joined fellow Premier League club Chelsea on a six-year contract with an option of an additional year, for a reported fee of £19m.

On 1 September 2025, Kellyman joined EFL League One side Cardiff City on loan until the end of the 2025–26 season. He was named EFL Young Player of the Month for April 2026.

=== Strasbourg ===
On 25 August 2026, Kellyman signed for fellow BlueCo club Strasbourg for a reported fee of £5,100,000.

== International career ==
Having represented Northern Ireland at both under-17 and under-18 level, Kellyman officially opted to switch his international allegiance to the country of his birth, England, in September 2023, following reports which surfaced in March of the same year.

On 1 September 2023, Kellyman received a call-up for England under-19s for their upcoming matches against Germany and Switzerland. He went on to make his U19 debut during a 1–0 defeat to Germany in Oliva on 6 September 2023.

In May 2024, Kellyman was called up by England under-20s for the first time, but was replaced by Romain Esse later.

== Career statistics ==
As of match played 2 May 2026

Appearances and goals by club, season and competition
| Club | Season | League | | | National cup (Note: Includes FA Cup) | | League cup (Note: Includes EFL Cup) | | Europe | | Other | | Total | |
| Club | Season | Division | Apps | Goals | Apps | Goals | Apps | Goals | Apps | Goals | Apps | Goals | Apps | Goals |
|---|---|---|---|---|---|---|---|---|---|---|---|---|---|---|
| Aston Villa U21 | 2022–23 | — | | | — | | — | | — | | 1 (Note: Appearance(s) in EFL Trophy) | 0 | 1 | 0 |
| Aston Villa U21 | 2023–24 | — | | | — | | — | | — | | 2 | 1 | 2 | 1 |
| Aston Villa U21 | Total | | — | | — | | — | | — | | 3 | 1 | 3 | 1 |
| Aston Villa | 2023–24 | Premier League | 2 | 0 | 0 | 0 | 1 | 0 | 3 (Note: Appearances in UEFA Europa Conference League) | 0 | — | | 6 | 0 |
| Chelsea | 2024–25 | Premier League | 0 | 0 | 0 | 0 | 0 | 0 | 0 | 0 | 0 | 0 | 0 | 0 |
| Chelsea | 2025–26 | Premier League | 0 | 0 | — | | — | | — | | — | | 0 | 0 |
| Chelsea | 2026–27 | Premier League | 0 | 0 | — | | — | | — | | — | | 0 | 0 |
| Chelsea | Total | | 0 | 0 | 0 | 0 | 0 | 0 | 0 | 0 | 0 | 0 | 0 | 0 |
| Cardiff City (loan) | 2025–26 | League One | 36 | 11 | 1 | 0 | 2 | 0 | — | | 3 | 0 | 42 | 11 |
| Strasbourg | 2026–27 | Ligue 1 | 0 | 0 | 0 | 0 | — | | — | | — | | 0 | 0 |
| Career total | | | 38 | 11 | 1 | 0 | 3 | 0 | 3 | 0 | 6 | 1 | 51 | 12 |

== Honours ==
Aston Villa U21

- Birmingham Senior Cup: 2023–24

Cardiff City

- EFL League One runners-up: 2025–26

Individual

- EFL Young Player of the Month: April 2026
