= Brighton & Hove Albion F.C. Under-21s and Academy =

Brighton & Hove Albion Academy
- Nicknames: The Seagulls; The Albion
- Ground: American Express Elite Football Performance Centre
- Owner: Tony Bloom
- Chairman: Tony Bloom
- Head coach: Shannon Ruth (MU21); Carl Martin (MU18)
- League: Premier League 2 (MU21); U18 Premier League (MU18)
- Website: Brighton & Hove Albion MU21's; Brighton & Hove Albion MU18's
Home colours	Away colours	Third colours

The Brighton & Hove Albion Under-21s and Academy are the youth teams of Brighton & Hove Albion. The under-21 players play in the Premier League 2, the highest tier of under-21 team football in England. They also compete in the EFL Trophy, the National League Cup, the Premier League International Cup, the Sussex Senior Challenge Cup and the HKFC Soccer Sevens.
The academy teams culminate with the under-18's squad, who compete in the U18 Premier League Division South, the FA Youth Cup and the U18 Premier League Cup.

In 2024 the under-21's won the HKFC Soccer Sevens, defeating Aston Villa 2–0 in the final. In 2025 the under-21's progressed to the final, but were beaten by 1–0 by Jong AZ after extra time. In 2026 the under-21's won the HKFC Soccer Sevens, defeating Yokohama F. Marinos U21 2–0 in the final.

== Under-21 squad ==
Brighton & Hove Albion U21s
- Head coach: Shannon Ruth
- League: Premier League 2
- 2025-26: Premier League 2, Champions

As of 15 September 2026

Note: Flags indicate national team as defined under FIFA eligibility rules; some limited exceptions apply. Players may hold more than one non-FIFA nationality.

No.	Pos.	Nation	Player
42	DF	IRL	Sean Keogh
45	MF	ENG	Kofi Shaw
46	FW	ENG	George Munday
48	DF	ENG	Ben Barclay
49	MF	NGR	Nehemiah Oriola
50	MF	MAS	Shane Nti
51	DF	ENG	Callum Mackley
53	MF	ENG	Aidan West
54	DF	ENG	Jacob Vickers
55	MF	USA	Darius Lane

No.	Pos.	Nation	Player
56	MF	ENG	Jesse Middleton
57	FW	ENG	Tyler Silsby
58	FW	ENG	Valentin Joseph
59	MF	EGY	Younes Ibrahim
60	FW	WAL	Adam Brett
61	GK	AUS	Steven Hall
63	GK	ENG	Lorenz Ferdinand
64	GK	IRL	Michael Dike
65	GK	ENG	Oliver Mayer
66	MF	WAL	Henry Kasvosve

=== Loaned out ===
Note: Flags indicate national team as defined under FIFA eligibility rules; some limited exceptions apply. Players may hold more than one non-FIFA nationality.

No.	Pos.	Nation	Player
37	MF	ENG	Kamari Doyle (on loan at Leicester City until end of season)
39	FW	IRL	Mark O'Mahony (on loan at Burton Albion until end of season)
41	DF	ENG	Freddie Simmonds (on loan at AFC Wimbledon until end of season)
43	MF	ENG	Josh Robertson (on loan at Fleetwood Town until 1 January 2027)
47	DF	ENG	Charlie Tasker (on loan at Rochdale until end of season)

No.	Pos.	Nation	Player
62	GK	SWE	Nils Ramming (at Rochdale until end of season)
—	GK	ENG	James Beadle (at Birmingham City until end of season)
—	MF	ENG	Harry Howell (at Leicester City until end of season)
—	MF	COL	Matías Orozco (at Castellón until end of season)
—	MF	KOR	Yoon Do-young (at 1. FC Magdeburg until end of season)

== Under-18 squad ==
Brighton & Hove Albion U18s
- Head coach: Carl Martin
- League: U18 Premier League
- 2025-26: U18 Premier League, 4th of 15

As of 13 October 2026

Note: Flags indicate national team as defined under FIFA eligibility rules; some limited exceptions apply. Players may hold more than one non-FIFA nationality.

No.	Pos.	Nation	Player
67	MF	ENG	Anton Palmer
68	MF	ENG	Bailey Palmer
69	DF	ENG	Tate Ferdinand
70	DF	NOR	Sebastian Ademola
71	DF	PHI	Isaiah Alakiu
72	DF	ENG	Theo Outen
73	DF	ENG	Liam Crutchett
75	MF	ENG	Zachary Brennan
78	DF	ENG	Bode Newnham-Reeve
79	DF	ENG	Jackson Morby
80	DF	ITA	Cristiano Anah
82	GK	ENG	Liam Doyle
86	MF	ENG	Fraser Widdop
—	GK	ENG	George Lamb
—	GK	AUS	Charlie Wilson-Papps

No.	Pos.	Nation	Player
—	DF	ENG	Tobi Akapo
—	DF	ENG	Finley Cooper
—	DF	ENG	Jake Evans
—	DF	NGR	Chetam Nnamdi
—	DF	POL	Daniel Nneji
—	DF	ENG	Frankie Pope
—	DF	ENG	Rory Sykens
—	MF	CMR	Fin Dzekawong
—	MF	ENG	Louie Hartshorn
—	MF	ITA	Raffaele Oppong
—	MF	ENG	Brook Smith
—	FW	ENG	Chris Condy
—	FW	ENG	Jacob Parsons
—	FW	ENG	Mason Stephens

== Club honours ==
Premier League 2

- Winners (1) – 2026

HKFC Soccer Sevens

- Winners (2) – 2024, 2026
