= Hong Kong Football Club Stadium =

Sports venue in Happy Valley, Hong Kong

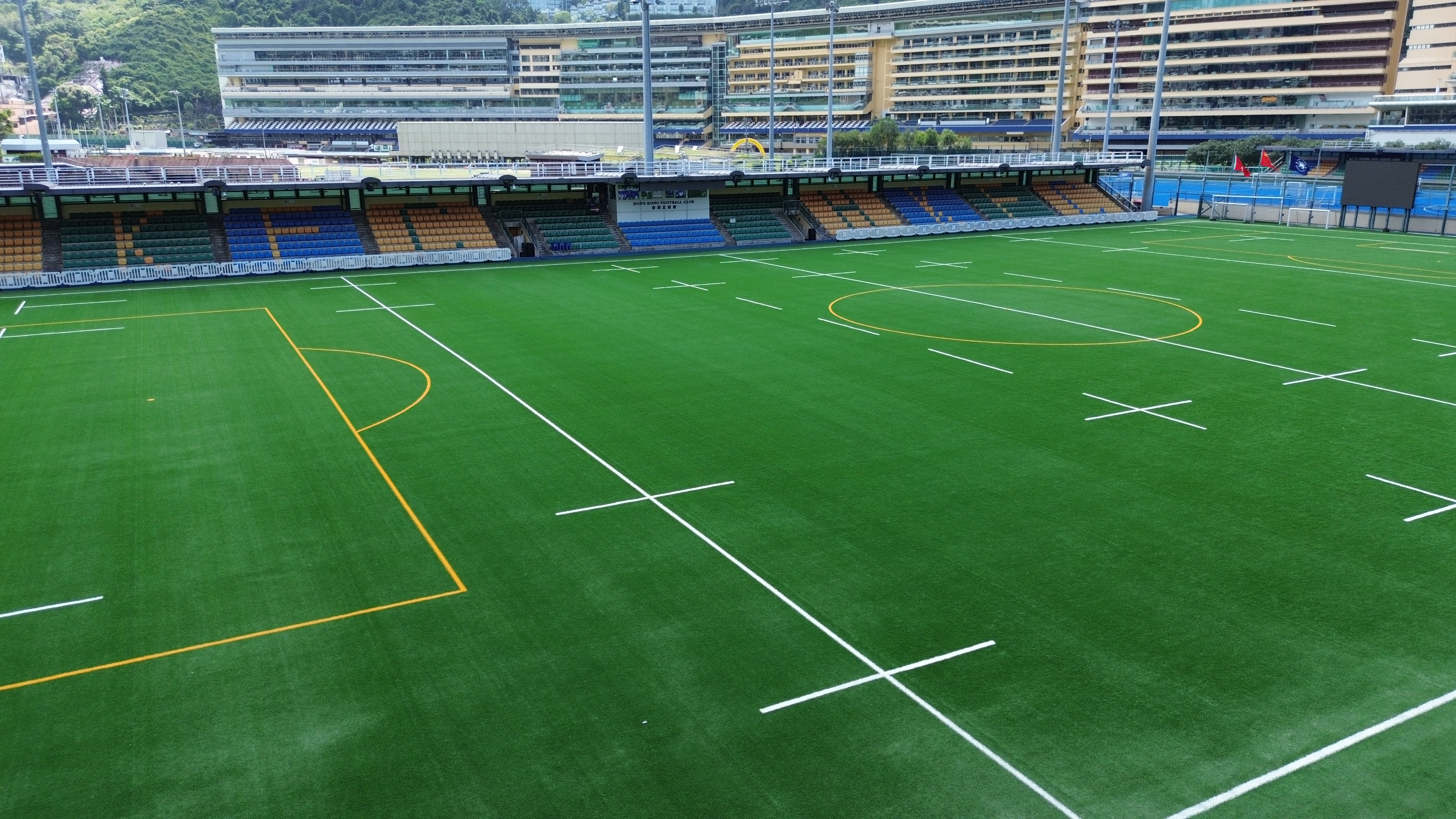
- Interactive map of Hong Kong Football Club Stadium
- Address: 3 Sports Road, Happy Valley, Hong Kong
- Coordinates: 22.274425°N 114.181677°E
- Owner: Hong Kong Football Club
- Operator: Hong Kong Football Club
- Capacity: 2,750
- Surface: Artificial turf
- Field size: 100.5 x 65 metres (110 x 71 yards)
- Public transit: Causeway Bay station

Construction
- Opened: 1886; 140 years ago
- Renovated: 1995; 31 years ago

Tenants
- HKFC (football); Lucky Mile; Club Albion (football); HKFC (rugby); Hong Kong national rugby union team

Hong Kong Football Club Stadium (Chinese: 香港足球會球場), nicknamed The Jungle, is a multi-purpose stadium located in Happy Valley, Hong Kong inside the oval of Happy Valley Racecourse. The stadium is privately owned by the Hong Kong Football Club and has 2,750 seats. It hosts the annual Hong Kong Tens tournament and the HKFC International Soccer Sevens tournament.

The main pitch is used for football and rugby (union) matches, and there is an adjoining hockey pitch. The playing surface has been synthetic since 2004.

== History ==
The original HKFC Stadium on Sports Road was the venue for the world-famous Hong Kong Sevens from its inception in 1976 until it outgrew its home and was moved to the Hong Kong Government Stadium (now the Hong Kong Stadium) in 1982. The original stadium was built in 1954 and demolished in 1995 and was located northeast, adjacent to the racecourse.

The stadium's home attendance record is 1,720, reached during the HKFC's defeat against Kitchee on 26 February 2023.

== See also ==
- Leighton Road
- Wong Nai Chung Road

Preceded by None	Hong Kong Sevens; Venue; 1976–1981	Succeeded by Hong Kong Stadium
