= James Huntley =

English association football player (born 2004)

Personal information
- Full name: James Alan Huntley
- Date of birth: 2 March 2004 (age 22)
- Place of birth: Ashington, Northumberland
- Position: Midfielder

Team information
- Current team: Morpeth Town

Youth career
- –2023: Newcastle United

Senior career*
| Years | Team | Apps | (Gls) |
| 2023–2025 | Newcastle United | 0 | (0) |
| 2025 | → Spennymoor Town (loan) | 5 | (0) |
| 2025– | Morpeth Town | 2 | (0) |
- * Club domestic league appearances and goals as of 17:34, 10 December 2025 (UTC)

James Alan Huntley (born 2 March 2004) is an English footballer who plays as a midfielder for Northern Premier League Division One East club Morpeth Town.

== Early life ==
Born in Ashington, Northumberland, Huntley attended school at Ashington Academy. He joined the academy of Newcastle United at the age of eight.

== Career ==
Huntley progressed through the Newcastle United academy and signed a first professional contract with the club in July 2022. He scored the winning goal for the Newcastle Under-21s in the Hong Kong Citi Super Sevens in the 2022–23 season. He was offered a new contract by Newcastle in June 2023.

Huntley was called-up to train with the Newcastle first team squad for a UEFA Champions League match against French champions Paris Saint Germain in November 2023. On 28 November 2023, he was named among the match day substitutes for the tie.

In February 2025, Huntley joined National League North side Spennymoor Town on loan until the end of the season.

In December 2025, Huntley joined Northern Premier League Premier Division club Morpeth Town.
