= Connor Allan =

Scottish footballer (born 2004)

Personal information
- Full name: Connor John Allan
- Date of birth: 10 January 2004 (age 22)
- Place of birth: Bellshill, Scotland
- Height: 1.90 m (6 ft 3 in)
- Positions: Defender; defensive midfielder

Team information
- Current team: Falkirk
- Number: 20

Youth career
- 2018–2021: Rangers

Senior career*
Years	Team	Apps	(Gls)
2021–2025	Rangers B	35	(4)
2022–2025	Rangers	0	(0)
2024–2025	→ Kelty Hearts (loan)	16	(1)
2025–	Falkirk	26	(1)
2025	→ Kelty Hearts (loan)	6	(0)

International career^{‡}
2019–2020	Scotland U16	?	(?)
2022	Scotland U19	3	(0)
2025	Scotland U20	1	(0)
2025–	Scotland U21	5	(0)
- * Club domestic league appearances and goals as of 09:51, 9 August 2026 (UTC) ‡ National team caps and goals as of 16:46, 22 June 2025 (UTC)

Connor John Allan (born 10 January 2004) is a Scottish professional footballer who plays as a defender for Scottish Premiership club Falkirk.

== Club career ==
=== Rangers ===
Allan signed his first professional contract with Rangers in June 2020, after impressing in the Alkass Cup.

On 9 October 2022, after impressing for the B team as well as playing every minute in the UEFA Youth League; Allan signed a new contract at Ibrox that committed his future at the club until the summer of 2025.

A few days after signing his new deal with Rangers, Allan was named on the first team bench for two UEFA Champions League group stage matches against Napoli, and Ajax respectively.

==== Kelty Hearts (loan) ====
On 20 September 2024, Allan joined Scottish League One club Kelty Hearts on loan until the end of the season.

Allan scored his first senior goal in a 2–0 home win against Annan Athletic. He featured 16 times in the league, scoring once before returning to Rangers.

=== Falkirk ===
On 3 February 2025, Allan signed for Scottish Championship side Falkirk for an undisclosed fee — signing a two-and-a-half-year deal and was immediately loaned back to Kelty Hearts until the end of the season. He returned to Falkirk on 9 May 2025, following the conclusion of the loan.

On 12 July, Allan made his debut for The Bairns during a 7–0 win against Brechin City in the Scottish League Cup group stage coming on as a 67th minute substitute for Scott Arfield at Glebe Park. During the 2025–26 season, Allan went onto make 32 appearances across all competitions, scoring once.

== International career ==
Allan has been capped at Scotland U16, Scotland U19, Scotland U20 and Scotland U21 level.

== Career statistics ==
As of match played 1 November 2026

Appearances and goals by club, season, and competition
Club	Season	League			National Cup (Note: Includes Scottish Cup)		League Cup (Note: Includes Scottish League Cup)		Other		Total	
Club	Season	Division	Apps	Goals	Apps	Goals	Apps	Goals	Apps	Goals	Apps	Goals
Rangers B	2021–22	Lowland Football League	0	0	–		–		0 (Note: Appearance(s) in the Scottish Challenge Cup)	0	0	0
Rangers B	2022–23	Lowland Football League	35	4	–		–		2	0	37	4
Rangers B	2023–24	Lowland Football League	0	0	–		–		4	0	4	0
Rangers B	2024–25	Lowland Football League	0	0	–		–		3	1	3	1
Rangers B	Club total	Lowland Football League	35	4	–		–		9	1	44	5
Rangers	2022–23	Scottish Premiership	0	0	0	0	0	0	0	0	0	0
Rangers	2023–24	Scottish Premiership	0	0	0	0	0	0	0	0	0	0
Rangers	2024–25	Scottish Premiership	0	0	0	0	0	0	0	0	0	0
Club total			0	0	0	0	0	0	0	0	0	0
Kelty Hearts (loan)	2024–25	Scottish League One	16	1	1	0	—		—		17	1
Falkirk	2024–25	Scottish Championship	0	0	—		—		—		0	0
Falkirk	2025–26	Scottish Premiership	25	1	3	0	4	0	—		32	1
Falkirk	2026–27	Scottish Premiership	1	0	0	0	3	1	—		4	1
Club total			26	1	3	0	7	1	0	0	36	2
Kelty Hearts (loan)	2024–25	Scottish League One	6	0	—		—		—		6	0
Total			83	6	4	0	7	1	9	1	103	8
