= Singapore FC =

Singaporean football club

Singapore Football Club
- Full name: Singapore Football Club
- Nickname: SFC
- Founded: 2019
- League: Cosmopolitan Football League; Equatorial Football League

Singapore Football Club is an association football club based in Singapore.

== History ==
Singapore Football Club was formed in 2019 upon merging three top amateur football clubs, SCC Firsts, SCC Tigers and Singapore Wanderers. The club currently has 3 teams competing in 2 competitive amateur football league in Singapore, Cosmopolitan Football League and the Equatorial Football League Premiership Division.
