= Kowloon Cricket Club =

Cricket ground in Hong Kong

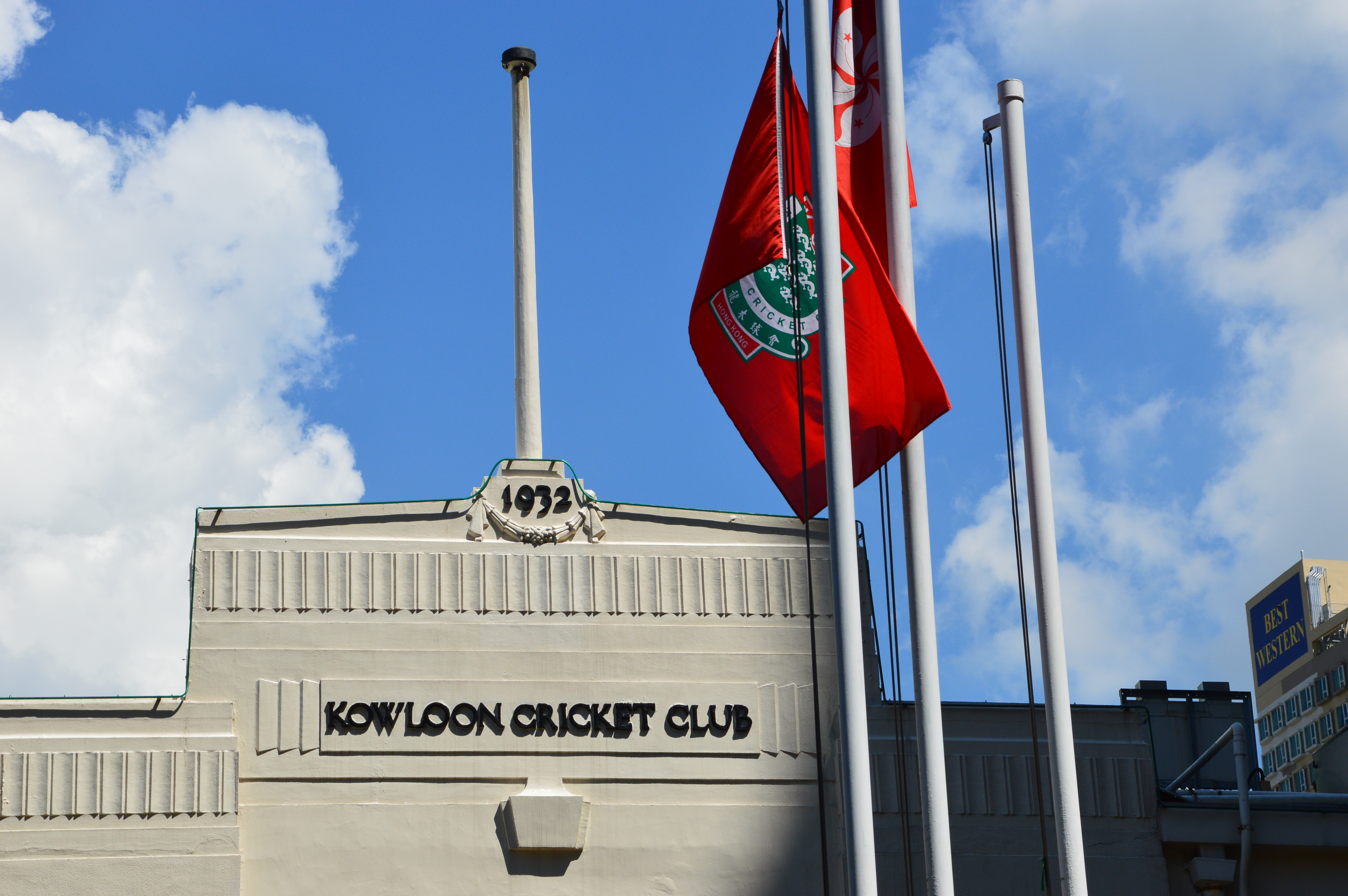
- Flag of Kowloon Cricket Club
- Interactive map of Kowloon Cricket Club

Ground information
- Location: Kowloon, Hong Kong
- Country: Hong Kong
- Coordinates: 22°18′16″N 114°10′26″E
- Establishment: 1904
- Capacity: 1,000

International information

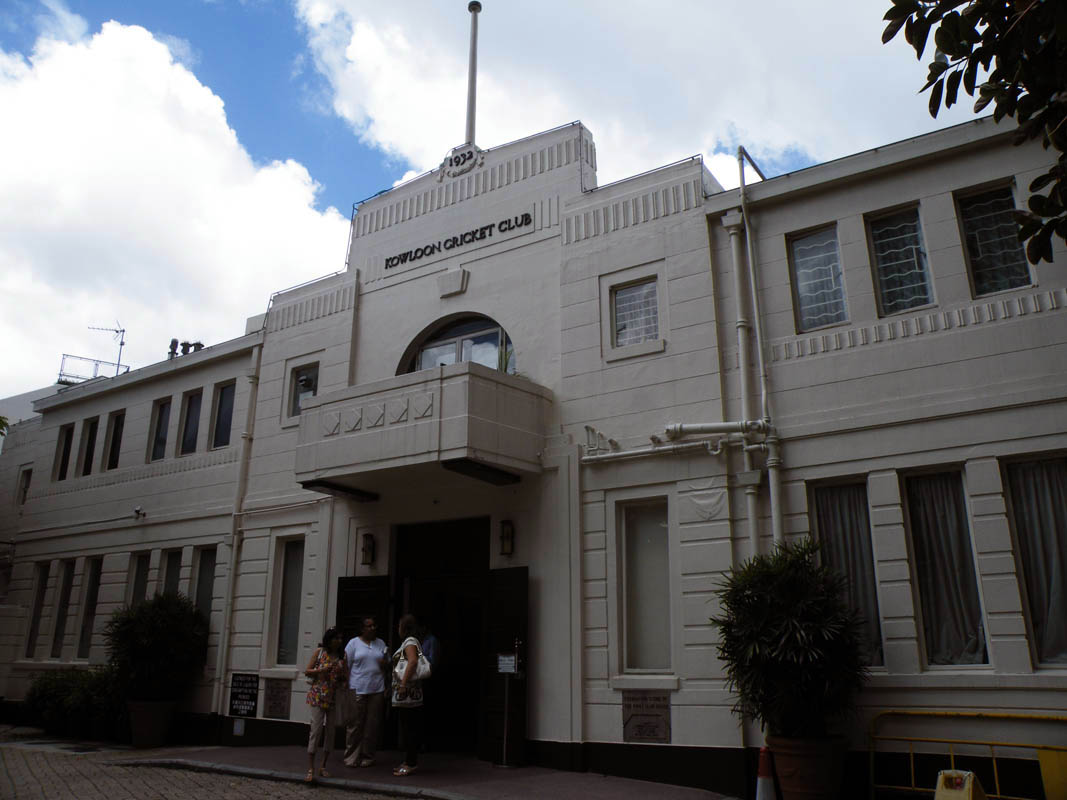
Kowloon Cricket Club clubhouse

The Kowloon Cricket Club, also called KCC (Chinese: 九龍木球會), is a members only cricket club and social club situated in Kowloon, Hong Kong, on Cox's Road.

== History ==
The Cricket Club was established on 4 October 1904 and was provided land from the government in King's Park. It competed with local clubs like the Hong Kong Cricket Club, the Craigengower Cricket Club, the Parsee Cricket Club, Royal Engineers, the Army Ordnance Corps CC and the Civil Service CC Royal Army Medical Corps and HMS Tamar soldiers played with KCC in the South China Morning Post Shield.

The foundation stone of the first Clubhouse was laid on 18 January 1908 by the President and benefactor, Sir Hormusjee N. Mody, who was later presented with an engraved silver trowel to mark the occasion. The Kowloon Cricket Club Pavilion was opened by the Governor H.E. Sir Frederick Lugard on 11 July 1908.

Due to World War II, the club did not operate between 1941 and 1946.

The club competed for the Hancock Memorial Shield after 1946.

As of January 2016, its head coach is Ryan Campbell, who is also the batting coach of the Hong Kong national cricket team.

== Facilities ==
The KCC has its own cricket pitch.

Since 1992 it has been the venue of the Hong Kong Cricket Sixes (apart from the 1996 and 1997) editions. It also has a full-size bowling green.
