= Wallsend Boys Club =

Association football club in England

- Full name: Wallsend Boys Club
- Nickname: Wallsend
- Founded: 1904
- Ground: Kirkley Park, Wallsend
- Coordinates: 54.9924°N 1.5487°W
- Chairman: Steve Dale
- League: Northern Alliance Division 1
- 2025–26: Northern Alliance Division One, 9th of 15 (promoted)
Team colours

Wallsend Boys Club is an English youth football club based in Wallsend, North Tyneside. The club is well known for producing professional footballers; more than 65 players from the club have gone on to play professionally, some of them even playing for the England side. They also have an adult team that plays in the Northern Alliance Division 1.

== History ==
The club was founded in 1904 by the employees and directors of Swan Hunters Shipyard in order to provide recreational activities for the apprentices and young people in the area and initially specialised in boxing. The original club premises were a series of wooden huts on Station Road, erected by workers from the shipyard. A fire destroyed the original premises and work commenced on the current club building in 1964, which was opened on 16 December 1966.

Club activities in the early days were mainly snooker, trampolining, judo, table tennis, cross country running and football. Various fund raising activities were held, including a "pram push" across England and a 24-hour relay race from Wallsend to Edinburgh Castle and back.

In 1975, the club opened seven days a week and formed a separate sub-committee for 11-a-side football. Over the years, the 11-a-side representative teams have won hundreds of trophies in local and national competitions. The club has gained a formidable reputation for the early development of many professional footballers.

In 2008, the club was awarded the Freedom of the City of North Tyneside, in recognition of what the deputy mayor called the club's "factory line of talent", and for its community work.

In June 2011, the club opened its first football centre, prior to which they had to play on park and local authority pitches. The facility, for which negotiations began in 2006, which is situated next to Wallsend Sports Centre on Rheydt Avenue, has:

- two senior size grass pitches,
- five junior size grass pitches,
- one mini-soccer size grass pitch, and
- a changing pavilion.

It was funded by grants of £850,000 from the Football Foundation, £150,000 from The FA and £301,000 from North Tyneside Council with the club itself raising £114,000 towards the scheme.

The Station Road headquarters of the club was demolished in the February and March 2012, following high winds in January which damaged one of the walls of the building.

== Former players ==
Professional players to have played for the club include:

- Elliot Anderson
- Paul Baker
- Steve Baker
- Peter Beardsley
- Ian Bogie
- Michael Bridges
- Steve Bruce
- Adam Campbell
- Michael Carrick
- Phil Cavener
- Vince Chapman
- Lee Clark
- Leif Davis
- Tony Dinning
- Robbie Elliott
- Nicky Evans
- Graham Fenton
- Fraser Forster
- Damon Gray
- Joe Grey
- Ray Hankin
- Chris Hedworth
- Rob Hindmarch
- Shaun Hutchinson
- Russell Irving
- Dan Jones
- Brian Laws
- Tony Lormor
- Shaun Lowther
- Kevin McDonald
- Neil McDonald
- Mark Maley
- Lee Novak
- Derrick Parker
- Ben Pringle
- Phil Ray
- Barry Richardson
- David Robinson
- David Roche
- Jack Roscamp
- Tony Sealy
- Thomas Shaftoe
- Alan Shearer
- Shola Shoretire
- Kevin Smith
- Michael Smith
- Eric Steele
- Paul Stephenson
- Mick Tait
- Paul Tait
- Jeff Tate
- Les Taylor
- Steven Taylor
- Alan Thompson
- Alan Waddle
- Mick Wardrobe
- Ian Watson
- Steve Watson
- Jake McInnes
- Alex Whitmore
- Tommy Widdrington
- Jeff Wrightson

=== International representation ===
The club has had a representative at six of the ten FIFA World Cup finals since 1986, with the exceptions coming in 1994, when the England national team did not qualify, 2002, 2018, and 2022. In 1986 and 1990 Peter Beardsley starred for England. In 1998 Alan Shearer was England captain. Michael Carrick made appearances for England in both the 2006 and 2010 tournaments. Fraser Forster was selected for the 2014 tournament, but did not make an appearance for England. Elliot Anderson was in the 2026 England squad which reached the semi-finals and won the bronze medal. Numerous other former players have made youth or B international appearances.
