= Hong Kong Football Club =

Multi-sports club based in Hong Kong

Hong Kong Football Club (HKFC; Chinese: 香港足球會), established in 1886, is a private members' club in Hong Kong. The name reflects its origins as a club for playing association football and rugby.

Situated in Happy Valley, the club's facilities are located adjacent to the Happy Valley Racecourse. The 2,750-capacity Hong Kong Football Club Stadium serves as the venue for the club's rugby and football matches and hosts most of the Hong Kong Rugby Union's international fixtures. It is also the venue for the HKFC International Rugby Tens and HKFC International Soccer Sevens tournaments.

== History ==
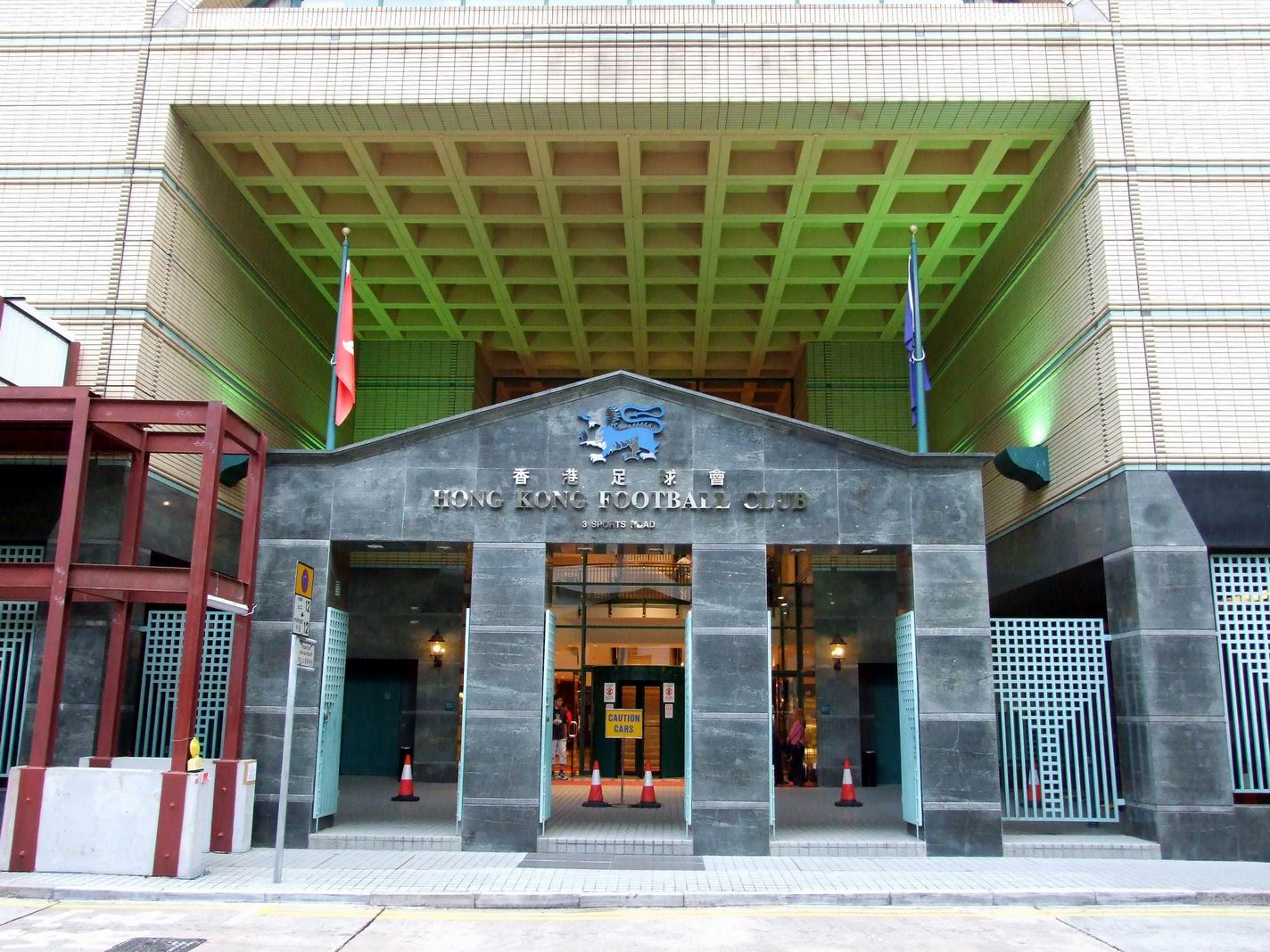
The HKFC main entrance

Hong Kong Football Club was founded in 1886 by Sir James Haldane Lockhart, following a meeting held at the Victoria Recreation Gymnasium on 12 February 1886. The club played its first rugby union match on 16 February 1886, followed by its first association football match on 16 March 1886 against the Royal Engineers.

The Hong Kong Sevens, one of the most prestigious rugby sevens tournaments in the world, was founded by the club and hosted at its stadium from 1976 until it moved to the larger Hong Kong Stadium in 1982.

In 1995, as part of the Happy Valley Racecourse redevelopment, the club moved into a new 64,000 square metre facility. The main building is located outside the race track, while the sports pitches are situated within the infield. In 2011, HKFC celebrated its 125th anniversary.

=== Club officials ===
Position	Staff
Chairman	(England) Neil Jensen
President	(England) Nick Hunsworth
Director of Operations	(Hong Kong) Mark Cameron
Head Physiotherapist	(Australia) Tegan McNaughton

== Football section ==
The football section currently competes in the Hong Kong Premier League, the top tier of Hong Kong football. Unlike other clubs in the league which are fully professional, HKFC operates on a semi-professional model.

== Senior leadership ==
The club is led by a President and a Chairman.

- President: Nick Hunsworth (2018–present)
- Chairman: Neil Jensen (2022–present)
