= 2026 HKFC Soccer Sevens =

Tournament details
- Country: Hong Kong
- Dates: 22–24 May 2026
- Teams: 16

Final positions
- Champions: (England) Brighton & Hove Albion U21
- Runners-up: (Japan) Yokohama F. Marinos U21

2026 HKFC Soccer Sevens, officially known as The HKFC Standard Chartered Priority Private Soccer Sevens due to sponsorship reasons, was the 23rd edition of the HKFC Soccer Sevens tournament.

== Competing Teams ==
On 31 January 2026, the dates for the 2026 tournament was announced, ahead of the draw on 13 March 2026. The draw was made for the men's and women's competitions in the same event, hosted by Craig Bellamy.

=== Men's Tournament ===
==== Group A ====
- (Netherlands) Jong AZ: (Netherlands) Koen Schilder, (Netherlands) Kiyani Zeggen, (Netherlands) Kiani Inge, (Netherlands) Bram van Driel, (Netherlands) Jeremiah Esajas, (Netherlands) Anthony Smits, (Ukraine) Bogdan Budko, (Netherlands) Jesper Zwart, (Netherlands) Deacon van der Klaauw, (Netherlands) Yoël van den Ban
- (England) West Ham United U21: (England) Mason Terry, (England) Ryan Battrum, (Greece) Rayan Oyebade, (England) Tyron Akpata, (England) Airidas Golambeckis, (England) Riley Hargan, (Mauritius) Gabriel Caliste, (England) Preston Fearon, (Scotland) Daniel Cummings, (England) Josh Ajala
- (Hong Kong) HKFC Captain's Select: (Hong Kong) Wong Tsz Chung, (United States) Auston Kranick, (Hong Kong) Calum Bloxham, (Spain) Pau Anglada, (Northern Ireland) Stuart Muldrew, (Hong Kong) Zanskar Blair, (Germany) Luis Salzmann, (Hong Kong) Ho Tung Lam, (Wales) Daniel Man, (Hong Kong) Edouard Barnes
- Hong Kong Representative Team: Sheung Hei Poon, Tin Wing Fung, Tsz Hin Loong, Long Tik Lin, Chin Yu Lam, Lung Ho Ho, Chun Ting Lee, Ho Yung, Jun Hei Ryan Fok, Sohgo Ichikawa

===== Group B =====
- (England) Brighton & Hove Albion U21: (England) Kofi Shaw, (England) Jesse Middleton, (England) Joshua Robertson, (England) Nehemiah Oriola, (England) Shane Nti, (Wales) Joe Belmont, (England) Tyler Silsby, (England) Callum Mackley, (Republic of Ireland) Sean Keogh, (Australia) Steven Hall
- (England) Leeds United U21: (England) Samuel Alker, (England) Loui Whitehead, (Cameroon) Carrick Njinko, (England) Louie Dudley, (Northern Ireland) Luke Matykiewicz, (England) Freddie Lane, (Italy) Kenneth Mensah, (England) Callum Mills, (Australia) Robbie Cook, (England) Louie Philpott
- Hong Kong FC: Bryan Lau, (France) William Mirwasser, (United States) Leo Montesinos, (England) Felix Perez-Doyle, (Japan) Tatsuya Inoue, Max Chan, (Australia) Dominic Johns, (Scotland) Cai McGunnigle, (Scotland) Jack Bennie, (England) Nicky Kedwards
- Singapore FC: (England) Jake Jessup, Cam Choi, Faisal Shahril, Shahrin Saberin, Sam Taylor, (England) Joe Claridge, Gabriel Quak, (Wales) Rhys Henry, (France) Vincent Bezecourt, Iqram Rifqi

==== Group C ====
- (England) Aston Villa U21: (England) Owen Asemota, (England) Ashton McWilliams, (Portugal) Rodrigo Fortes, (England) TJ Carroll, (England) Leon Routh, (England) Max Jenner, (England) Trai-Varn Mulley, (Republic of Ireland) Alfie Lynsky, (England) Mason Cotcher, (England) Luka Lynch
- (Northern Ireland) Larne U21: (Northern Ireland) Dylan Graham, (Northern Ireland) Logan Wallace, (Northern Ireland) Mikey Harkin, (Northern Ireland) Finlay Bayliss, (Northern Ireland) Niall Brown, (Northern Ireland) Benji Magee, (Northern Ireland) Josh Kee, (Northern Ireland) James Simpson, (Northern Ireland) Alex McAlister, (Northern Ireland) Daniel Gordon
- (Hong Kong) Lee Man: (Hong Kong) Chan Ka Ho, (Hong Kong) Timothy Chow, (Brazil) Willian Machado dos Santos, (Japan) Ryoya Tachibana, (Hong Kong) Wu Chun Ming, (Spain) Noah Baffoe, (Hong Kong) Lau Ka Kiu, (Hong Kong) Hiu To Yung, (Uzbekistan) Dostonbek Tursunov, (Hong Kong) Tu Wai Lim
- Singapore Cricket Club: Illyas Lee, Hazim Faiz, Kevin Wong, Kayden Neo, Aravindham Ramanathan, Kayden Tang, Shane Tan, Dylan Choo, Mathava Ranganathan, Izz Mohamed Ismail

===== Group D =====
- (Japan) Yokohama F. Marinos U21: (Japan) Go Saita, (Japan) Shin Miidera, (Japan) Kei Murakami, (Japan) Riku Hirano, (Japan) Kanata Hirano, (Japan) Shiyu Obata, (Japan) Hiei Tanaka, (Japan) Kakeru Matsunaga, (Japan) Keisuke Egawa, (Japan) Eita Sawaguchi
- (Scotland) Rangers B: (Scotland) Alfie Halliwell, (Scotland) Arran Kerr, (Scotland) Lyle Wark, (Scotland) Jack Wyllie, (Scotland) Connor Campbell, (Scotland) Aiden McCalion, (Scotland) Lewis Stewart, (Scotland) Calum Adamson, (Scotland) Cameron Fernie, (England) Zebedee Lawson
- Hong Kong Rangers: Chen Hao, Wong To Lam, Chow Wing Hei, Wong Yu San, (Japan) Shunsuke Murakami, Owen Cheung, (India) Prabhsimanjit Singh, (Japan) Makoto Rindo, (Ghana) Nassam Ibrahim, (Ghana) Maxwell Ansah
- (Hong Kong) Yau Yee League Select: (Japan) Issey Maholo, (Japan) Toshihiro Murakoshi, (Spain) Ibai Garatea, (Hong Kong) Daniel Morrison, (England) Oliver Rossiter, (Hong Kong) Max Dowding, (Netherlands) Lennard de Haan, (Hong Kong) JJ Shonde, (Hong Kong) Gregory Camargo, (Hong Kong) Matthew Kirkman

=== Women's Tournament ===
==== Group A ====
- (Japan) Urawa Red Diamonds: Sakurai Madoka, Harada Mako, Koizumi Ena, Takatsuka Ena, Tanno Ririka, Kubo Kaho, Kumazawa Kaho, Ise Hana, Takahashi Yuna, Sakakibara Kotono
- (Hong Kong) TSL: Chan Tsz Chan, Isabella Bandoja, Lanie Ortillo, Tsang Lai Mae Halasan, Leung Hong Kiu Anke, So Ching Long, Chan Yee Hing, Sung Yasmin Li Mon, Ma Chak Shun, Ng Cheuk Wai
- Hong Kong FC: Connie Tang, Erin Leung, Karina Kam, Nat Ma, Shannon Maloney, Amy Sleeper, Talia Duvernay, Malinda Davis, Jeanne Dupoiron, Dawn Wong
- (Singapore) Eastern Thunder: Panita Phomrat, Channaya Phetnoi, Prawnapang Sawangarom, Waniwisa Wongcharoen, Anupa Noinueai, Bencharat Suriyan, Matika Thaprik, Chirarak Khamtan, Yansiri Sueanak, Thananthon Vicha

==== Group B ====
- (Wales) Wrexham: Tillie Ashworth, Isabel Barnett, Annie Collins, Olive Shufflebotham-Cooke, Mazie Johnson, Grace Morris, Sophie Nash, Anna Owen, Sienna Perry, Bella Riley
- (Hong Kong) Kitchee: Leung Wai Nga, Kwong Wing Yan, Fu Chiu MNan, Chung Pui Ki, Cham Ching Man, Chu So Kwan, Vos Danielle Anna Maria, Cheung Wai Ki, Li Rachel Sun Wai, Ho Mui Mei
- (Hong Kong) HKFC Captain's Select: Mia Pearson, Kerry Stephen, Melanie Sin, Ines Grainger, Emma Chua, Munrina Barma, Alison Tang, Leah Moi, Lucy Yuen, Cindy Yao
- (Hong Kong) HKFA Select: Yi Yan Lee, Sin Kwan Chu, Yan Hei Mo, Chin Lam Jaylynn Chong, Ching Katrina Lau Nga, Lok Ching Fong, Li Hau Yi, Yuen Ting Wai, Wing Ching Chan, Wing Yu Kwan

=== Masters' Tournament ===
==== Group A ====
- (England) PFA All Stars: (England) Tony Warner, (England) Andy Griffin, (Angola) Rui Marques, (England) Jake Livermore, (England) Hayden Mullins, (Portugal) Luís Boa Morte, (Republic of Ireland) Noel Hunt, (England) Robert Threlfall, (Republic of Ireland) Simon Cox, (England) Zavon Hines, (England) Charlie Daniels
- (Hong Kong) Ampcontrol Discovery Bay: (China) Zhengpang Wang, (Macau) Niki Torrão, (Brazil) David Bala, (Spain) Iñigo Calderón, (Hong Kong) Michael Campion, (Hong Kong) Oliver Rendall, (Hong Kong) Christian Annan, (Japan) Kohei Ito, (Hong Kong) Fernando Recio, (Brazil) Mauricio, (Hong Kong) Lo Kwan Yee
- Singapore Cricket Club Masters: Kevin Teo, Jonathan Huang, (Japan) Hiromitsu Nakaue, Ganesh Kumar Vendesan, Aloysius Yap, Aaron Chew, Chan Guo Guang, Justin Kong, (Japan) Tadanari Lee, Tan Chun Hao, Jasper Seet
- (Hong Kong) HKFC Chairman's Select: (Hong Kong) Eugene Kan, (England) Martin Rainer, (Hong Kong) Daniel Yee, (England) Phil Dowding, (England) Harry Bradley-Barnard, (England) Robbie Bacon, (Hong Kong) Sean Ko, (Japan) Shohei Shida, (Hong Kong) Max Poon, (Hong Kong) Jan Souleyman, (Hong Kong) Daniel Aguilar
- (Hong Kong) Kowloon Cricket Club Masters: (Hong Kong) Billy Brennan, (Hong Kong) Jean-Baptiste Roy, (Hong Kong) Marco Klaus, (Hong Kong) So Loi Keung, (Italy) Luca Merlone, (England) Leroy Lita, (Hong Kong) Chris De Laiglesia, (Hong Kong) Kenneth Cheng, (Hong Kong) Dave Kin Ho Lau, (England) Michael Samuel Trayford, (England) Greg Halford

==== Group B ====
- (Hong Kong) Yau Yee League Select: (Italy) Tommaso Berni, (France) Bacary Sagna, (England) James Lewis, (England) Martin Rigby, (England) John Meighan, (England) Alastair Thomson, (England) Paul Crompton, (Switzerland) Timm Klose, (Slovakia) Marek Hamšík, (Germany) Kevin Kurányi, (Croatia) Torsten Smolčić
- Wallsend Boys Club Hong Kong: Alex Stamp, Diego Eli, Tomas Maronesi, Ju Yingzhi, Sui Kei Chu, (Scotland) Robert Scott, (Brazil) Wellingsson de Souza, (Brazil) Edilson, Giovane, Lee Hong Lim
- Singapore FC Masters: Lionel Lewis, Adam Wise, Andrew Wylde, (England) Danny Simpson, (England) Marc Albrighton, Sebastian Beer, (Republic of Ireland) Jack Cullinane, Dominic Connor, Erik Peters, Fazrul Nawaz, Shahril Ishak
- (Hong Kong) HKFC Masters: (England) Peter Smith, (England) Martin Fray, (Netherlands) Freek Schipper, (Republic of Ireland) Fiachra McArdle, (Japan) Shunsuke Nakamura, (Hong Kong) Adrian Worth, (Hong Kong) Simon Siu Man Liu, (Hong Kong) Andy Russell, (Hong Kong) Shane Jeffery, (Portugal) Jean Maciel, (Portugal) Hugo Moreira
- (Japan) Yokohama Country & Athletic Club: (Japan) Nobuhiro Koka, (England) Thomas Richards, (Japan) Kei Hashimoto, (Japan) Hiroyuki Amano, (Hong Kong) Leung Ka Yau, (Japan) Kyoichi Joseph Takada, (Japan) Hisao Yasuda, (Hong Kong) Li Kai Yeung, (Singapore) Marcus Byron Ng, (Armenia) Levon Ter-Isahakyan, (Hong Kong) Lee Sze Ho

== Main Tournament - Group Stage ==
All times are Hong Kong Time (UTC+8)

=== Group A ===
Team	Pld	W	D	L	GF	GA	GD	Pts
(Netherlands) Jong AZ	3	2	1	0	4	1	+3	7
(England) West Ham United U21	3	2	0	1	5	2	+3	6
(Hong Kong) HKFC Captain's Select	3	1	1	1	3	3	0	4
Hong Kong Representative Team	3	0	0	3	0	6	−6	0

Updated to match(es) played on 23 May 2026. Source:

23 May 2026	(Netherlands) Jong AZ	1–1	HKFC Captain's Select (Hong Kong)	Hong Kong
14:57	Budko		Man	Stadium: Hong Kong Football Club Stadium

23 May 2026	Hong Kong Representative Team	0–3	West Ham United U21 (England)	Hong Kong
15:14			Ajala	Stadium: Hong Kong Football Club Stadium

23 May 2026	(Netherlands) Jong AZ	2–0	Hong Kong Representative Team	Hong Kong
16:39	Budko; van den Ban			Stadium: Hong Kong Football Club Stadium

23 May 2026	(England) West Ham United U21	2–1	HKFC Captain's Select (Hong Kong)	Hong Kong
16:56	Ajala; Fearon		Salzmann	Stadium: Hong Kong Football Club Stadium

23 May 2026	(England) West Ham United U21	0–1	Jong AZ (Netherlands)	Hong Kong
18:55			Smits	Stadium: Hong Kong Football Club Stadium

23 May 2026	(Hong Kong) HKFC Captain's Select	1–0	Hong Kong Representative Team	Hong Kong
19:29	Barnes			Stadium: Hong Kong Football Club Stadium

=== Group B ===
Team	Pld	W	D	L	GF	GA	GD	Pts
(England) Brighton & Hove Albion U21	3	3	0	0	9	1	+8	9
Hong Kong FC	3	2	0	1	4	3	+1	6
(England) Leeds United U21	3	1	0	2	3	5	−2	3
Singapore FC	3	0	0	3	2	9	−7	0

Updated to match(es) played on 23 May 2026. Source:

23 May 2026	Singapore FC	0–2	Leeds United U21 (England)	Hong Kong
15:31			Alker	Stadium: Hong Kong Football Club Stadium

23 May 2026	(England) Brighton & Hove Albion U21	1–0	Hong Kong FC	Hong Kong
15:48	Nti			Stadium: Hong Kong Football Club Stadium

23 May 2026	(England) Brighton & Hove Albion U21	5–1	Singapore FC	Hong Kong
17:30	Belmont; Shaw; Silsby		Claridge	Stadium: Hong Kong Football Club Stadium

23 May 2026	(England) Leeds United U21	1–2	Hong Kong FC	Hong Kong
17:47	Alker		McGunnigle; Mirwasser	Stadium: Hong Kong Football Club Stadium

23 May 2026	(England) Leeds United U21	0–3	Brighton & Hove Albion U21 (England)	Hong Kong
19:12			Nti; Oriola	Stadium: Hong Kong Football Club Stadium

23 May 2026	Hong Kong FC	2–1	Singapore FC	Hong Kong
19:46	Chan; Mirwasser		Bezecourt	Stadium: Hong Kong Football Club Stadium

=== Group C ===
Team	Pld	W	D	L	GF	GA	GD	Pts
(England) Aston Villa U21	3	3	0	0	10	2	+8	9
(Northern Ireland) Larne U21	3	2	0	1	5	2	+3	6
(Hong Kong) Lee Man	3	1	0	2	5	3	+2	3
Singapore Cricket Club	3	0	0	3	0	13	−13	0

Updated to match(es) played on 23 May 2026. Source:

23 May 2026	Singapore Cricket Club	0–3	Larne U21 (Northern Ireland)	Hong Kong
09:08			Magee; Gordon	Stadium: Hong Kong Football Club Stadium

23 May 2026	(England) Aston Villa U21	2–1	Lee Man (Hong Kong)	Hong Kong
09:25	Cotcher; Routh		Tachibana	Stadium: Hong Kong Football Club Stadium

23 May 2026	(Northern Ireland) Larne U21	1–0	Lee Man (Hong Kong)	Hong Kong
11:07	Harkin			Stadium: Hong Kong Football Club Stadium

23 May 2026	(England) Aston Villa U21	6–0	Singapore Cricket Club	Hong Kong
11:24	Carroll; McWilliams; Lynch; Jenner; Mulley			Stadium: Hong Kong Football Club Stadium

23 May 2026	(Hong Kong) Lee Man	4–0	Singapore Cricket Club	Hong Kong
12:49	Baffoe			Stadium: Hong Kong Football Club Stadium

23 May 2026	(Northern Ireland) Larne U21	1–2	Aston Villa U21 (England)	Hong Kong
13:06	Harkin		Lynch; Cotcher	Stadium: Hong Kong Football Club Stadium

=== Group D ===
Team	Pld	W	D	L	GF	GA	GD	Pts
(Japan) Yokohama F. Marinos U21	3	2	1	0	5	1	+4	7
(Scotland) Rangers B	3	1	2	0	7	3	+4	5
(Hong Kong) Yau Yee League Select	3	1	1	1	3	4	−1	4
Hong Kong Rangers	3	0	0	3	2	9	−7	0

Updated to match(es) played on 23 May 2026. Source:

23 May 2026	(Japan) Yokohama F. Marinos U21	2–0	Hong Kong Rangers	Hong Kong
09:42	Tanaka; Hirano			Stadium: Hong Kong Football Club Stadium

23 May 2026	(Hong Kong) Yau Yee League Select	1–1	Rangers B (Scotland)	Hong Kong
09:59	Shonde		Lawson	Stadium: Hong Kong Football Club Stadium

23 May 2026	(Japan) Yokohama F. Marinos U21	2–0	Yau Yee League Select (Hong Kong)	Hong Kong
11:41	Hirano; Obata			Stadium: Hong Kong Football Club Stadium

23 May 2026	(Scotland) Rangers B	5–1	Hong Kong Rangers	Hong Kong
11:58	Lawson; Wark		Murakami	Stadium: Hong Kong Football Club Stadium

23 May 2026	Hong Kong Rangers	1–2	Yau Yee League Select (Hong Kong)	Hong Kong
13:23	Cheung		Shonde	Stadium: Hong Kong Football Club Stadium

23 May 2026	(Scotland) Rangers B	1–1	Yokohama F. Marinos U21 (Japan)	Hong Kong
13:40	Lawson		Miidera	Stadium: Hong Kong Football Club Stadium

== Women's Tournament - Group Stage ==
=== Group A ===
Team	Pld	W	D	L	GF	GA	GD	Pts
(Japan) Urawa Red Diamonds	3	3	0	0	12	0	+12	9
(Hong Kong) TSL	3	2	0	1	5	3	+2	6
(Singapore) Eastern Thunder	3	1	0	2	3	4	−1	3
Hong Kong FC	3	0	0	3	0	13	−13	0

Updated to match(es) played on 22 May 2026. Source:

22 May 2026	(Hong Kong) TSL	4–0	Hong Kong FC	Hong Kong
18:08	Leung Hong Kui Anke,, Ortillo			Stadium: Hong Kong Football Club Stadium

22 May 2026	(Japan) Urawa Red Diamonds	3–0	Eastern Thunder (Singapore)	Hong Kong
19:33	Sakakibara, Sakurai			Stadium: Hong Kong Football Club Stadium; Referee: –

23 May 2026	(Singapore) Eastern Thunder	0–1	TSL (Hong Kong)	Hong Kong
17:13			Leung Hong Kiu Anke	Stadium: Hong Kong Football Club Stadium

23 May 2026	(Japan) Urawa Red Diamonds	6–0	Hong Kong FC	Hong Kong
18:38	Takatsuka; Ise; Sakakibara; Sakurai			Stadium: Hong Kong Football Club Stadium

23 May 2026	(Hong Kong) TSL	0–3	Urawa Red Diamonds (Japan)	Hong Kong
20:03			Ise; Harada; Tanno	Stadium: Hong Kong Football Club Stadium

23 May 2026	Hong Kong FC	0–3	Eastern Thunder (Singapore)	Hong Kong
20:20			Noinueai; Suriyan; Wongcharoen	Stadium: Hong Kong Football Club Stadium

=== Group B ===
Team	Pld	W	D	L	GF	GA	GD	Pts
(Hong Kong) Kitchee	3	3	0	0	6	3	+3	9
(Hong Kong) HKFA Select	3	2	0	1	4	2	+2	6
(Wales) Wrexham	3	1	0	2	2	3	−1	3
(Hong Kong) HKFC Captain's Select	3	0	0	3	1	5	−4	0

Updated to match(es) played on 23 May 2026. Source:

22 May 2026	(Hong Kong) HKFA Select	1–2	Kitchee (Hong Kong)	Hong Kong
18:25	Hau Yi Li		So Kwan Chu; Rachel Su Wai Li	Stadium: Hong Kong Football Club Stadium

22 May 2026	(Wales) Wrexham	1–0	HKFC Captain's Select (Hong Kong)	Hong Kong
19:16	Owen			Stadium: Hong Kong Football Club Stadium

23 May 2026	(Hong Kong) Kitchee	2–1	HKFC Captain's Select (Hong Kong)	Hong Kong
08:34	Mui Mei Ho; Pui Ki Chung		Yuen	Stadium: Hong Kong Football Club Stadium

23 May 2026	(Wales) Wrexham	0–1	HKFA Select (Hong Kong)	Hong Kong
08:51			Wing Ching Chan	Stadium: Hong Kong Football Club Stadium

23 May 2026	(Hong Kong) HKFC Captain's Select	0–2	HKFA Select (Hong Kong)	Hong Kong
10:33			Ching Fong Lok; Lau Nga Katrina Ching	Stadium: Hong Kong Football Club Stadium

23 May 2026	(Hong Kong) Kitchee	2–1	Wrexham (Wales)	Hong Kong
10:50	Pui Ki Chung; wai Ki Cheung		Riley	Stadium: Hong Kong Football Club Stadium

== Masters Tournament - Group Stage ==
=== Group A ===
Team	Pld	W	D	L	GF	GA	GD	Pts
(Hong Kong) Ampcontrol Discovery Bay	4	3	1	0	8	2	+6	10
(England) PFA All Stars	4	2	0	2	3	5	−2	6
Singapore Cricket Club Masters	4	1	1	2	3	4	−1	4
(Hong Kong) HKFC Chairman's Select	4	1	1	2	2	4	−2	4
(Hong Kong) Kowloon Cricket Club Masters	4	0	3	1	2	3	−1	3

Updated to match(es) played on 23 May 2026. Source:

22 May 2026	(Hong Kong) HKFC Chairman's Select	1–3	Ampcontrol Discovery Bay (Hong Kong)	Hong Kong
17:00	Shida		Campion; Torrão; Wang	Stadium: Hong Kong Football Club Stadium

22 May 2026	Singapore Cricket Club Masters	2–1	PFA All Stars (England)	Hong Kong
17:34	Vendesan; Lee		Cox	Stadium: Hong Kong Football Club Stadium

22 May 2026	(Hong Kong) Kowloon Cricket Club Masters	1–1	Ampcontrol Discovery Bay (Hong Kong)	Hong Kong
18:42	Halford		Bala	Stadium: Hong Kong Football Club Stadium

22 May 2026	(England) PFA All Stars	1–0	HKFC Chairman's Select (Hong Kong)	Hong Kong
20:07	Daniels			Stadium: Hong Kong Football Club Stadium

22 May 2026	(Hong Kong) Kowloon Cricket Club Masters	1–1	Singapore Cricket Club Masters	Hong Kong
20:24	Lita		Nakaue	Stadium: Hong Kong Football Club Stadium

23 May 2026	(Hong Kong) HKFC Chairman's Select	0–0	Kowloon Cricket Club Masters (Hong Kong)	Hong Kong
08:00				Stadium: Hong Kong Football Club Stadium

23 May 2026	(Hong Kong) Ampcontrol Discovery Bay	1–0	Singapore Cricket Club Masters	Hong Kong
08:17	Bala			Stadium: Hong Kong Football Club Stadium

23 May 2026	(England) PFA All Stars	1–0	Kowloon Cricket Club Masters (Hong Kong)	Hong Kong
10:16	McGleish			Stadium: Hong Kong Football Club Stadium

23 May 2026	Singapore Cricket Club Masters	0–1	HKFC Chairman's Select (Hong Kong)	Hong Kong
12:15			Aguilar	Stadium: Hong Kong Football Club Stadium

23 May 2026	(Hong Kong) Ampcontrol Discovery Bay	3–0	PFA All Stars (England)	Hong Kong
12:32	Bala; Calderón; Campion			Stadium: Hong Kong Football Club Stadium

=== Group B ===
Team	Pld	W	D	L	GF	GA	GD	Pts
(Hong Kong) Yau Yee League Select	4	3	1	0	14	1	+13	10
Singapore FC Masters	4	3	0	1	7	2	+5	9
(Hong Kong) HKFC Masters	4	2	1	1	9	2	+7	7
Wallsend Boys Club Hong Kong	4	1	0	3	10	5	+5	3
(Japan) Yokohama Country & Athletic Club	4	0	0	4	0	30	−30	0

Updated to match(es) played on 23 May 2026. Source:

22 May 2026	(Hong Kong) HKFC Masters	2–1	Wallsend Boys Club Hong Kong	Hong Kong
17:17	Russell		Diego	Stadium: Hong Kong Football Club Stadium

22 May 2026	(Japan) Yokohama Country & Athletic Club	0–5	Singapore FC Masters	Hong Kong
17:51			Simpson; Connor; Nawaz; Cullinane; Albrighton	Stadium: Hong Kong Football Club Stadium

22 May 2026	Wallsend Boys Club Hong Kong	1–2	Yau Yee League Select (Hong Kong)	Hong Kong
18:59	Lee Hong Lim		Meighan; Hamšík	Stadium: Hong Kong Football Club Stadium

22 May 2026	(Hong Kong) HKFC Masters	7–0	Yokohama Country & Athletic Club (Japan)	Hong Kong
19:50	Worth; Maciel; Russell; Schipper; Jeffrey			Stadium: Hong Kong Football Club Stadium

22 May 2026	Singapore FC Masters	0–2	Yau Yee League Select (Hong Kong)	Hong Kong
20:41			Hamšík	Stadium: Hong Kong Football Club Stadium

23 May 2026	(Hong Kong) Yau Yee League Select	0–0	HKFC Masters (Hong Kong)	Hong Kong
16:05				Stadium: Hong Kong Football Club Stadium

23 May 2026	(Japan) Yokohama Country & Athletic Club	0–8	Wallsend Boys Club Hong Kong	Hong Kong
16:22			Giovane; Wellingsson; Scott	Stadium: Hong Kong Football Club Stadium

23 May 2026	(Hong Kong) Yau Yee League Select	10–0	Yokohama Country & Athletic Club (Japan)	Hong Kong
18:04	Crompton; Hamšík; Thompson; Meighan; Klose			Stadium: Hong Kong Football Club Stadium

23 May 2026	Wallsend Boys Club Hong Kong	0–1	Singapore FC Masters	Hong Kong
18:21			Pieters	Stadium: Hong Kong Football Club Stadium

23 May 2026	Singapore FC Masters	1–0	HKFC Masters (Hong Kong)	Hong Kong
20:37	Albrighton			Stadium: Hong Kong Football Club Stadium

== Final stage ==
=== Main Cup ===
==== Quarter-finals ====
24 May 2026	(Netherlands) Jong AZ	3–2	Larne U21 (Northern Ireland)	Hong Kong
11:30	van den Ban; Inge		Magee; Gordon	Stadium: Hong Kong Football Club Stadium

24 May 2026	(Scotland) Rangers B	0–2	Brighton & Hove Albion U21 (England)	Hong Kong
11:48			Robertson; Nti	Stadium: Hong Kong Football Club Stadium

24 May 2026	(England) Aston Villa U21	2–1 (a.e.t.)	West Ham United U21 (England)	Hong Kong
12:06	Lynch; McWilliams		Battrum	Stadium: Hong Kong Football Club Stadium

24 May 2026	Hong Kong FC	1–2	Yokohama F. Marinos U21 (Japan)	Hong Kong
12:24	Inoue		Tanaka; Miidera	Stadium: Hong Kong Football Club Stadium

==== Semi-finals ====
24 May 2026	(Netherlands) Jong AZ	1–2	Brighton & Hove Albion U21 (England)	Hong Kong
15:41	van den Ban		Robertson; Keogh	Stadium: Hong Kong Football Club Stadium

24 May 2026	(England) Aston Villa U21	0–2	Yokohama F. Marinos U21 (Japan)	Hong Kong
15:59			Hirano; Murakami	Stadium: Hong Kong Football Club Stadium

==== Final ====
24 May 2026
18:40

(England) Brighton & Hove Albion U21	2–0	Yokohama F. Marinos U21 (Japan)
Middleton; Silsby

Hong Kong Football Club Stadium, Hong Kong

=== Main Shield ===
==== Semi-finals ====
24 May 2026	(Northern Ireland) Larne U21	0–1	Rangers B (Scotland)	Hong Kong
15:05			McCalion	Stadium: Hong Kong Football Club Stadium

24 May 2026	(England) West Ham United U21	1–0	Hong Kong FC	Hong Kong
15:23	Ajala			Stadium: Hong Kong Football Club Stadium

==== Final ====
24 May 2026
17:46

(Scotland) Rangers B	2–2 (a.e.t.)	West Ham United U21 (England)
Stewart		Cummings; Oyebade
Penalties
	1–2

Hong Kong Football Club Stadium, Hong Kong

=== Main Plate ===
==== Quarter-finals ====
24 May 2026	(Hong Kong) HKFC Captain's Select	3–0	Singapore Cricket Club	Hong Kong
09:42	Man; Anglada			Stadium: Hong Kong Football Club Stadium

24 May 2026	Hong Kong Rangers	2–3	Leeds United U21 (England)	Hong Kong
10:00	Ansah; Makoto		Alker; Lane	Stadium: Hong Kong Football Club Stadium

24 May 2026	(Hong Kong) Lee Man	2–1	Hong Kong Representative Team	Hong Kong
10:18	Tachibana; Chow		Long Tik Lin	Stadium: Hong Kong Football Club Stadium

24 May 2026	Singapore FC	1–0	Yau Yee League Select (Hong Kong)	Hong Kong
10:36	Henry			Stadium: Hong Kong Football Club Stadium

==== Semi-finals ====
24 May 2026	(Hong Kong) HKFC Captain's Select	2–1	Leeds United U21 (England)	Hong Kong
14:29	Man; Barnes		Alker	Stadium: Hong Kong Football Club Stadium

24 May 2026	(Hong Kong) Lee Man	4–0	Singapore FC	Hong Kong
14:47	Willian; Hui To Yung; Baffoe			Stadium: Hong Kong Football Club Stadium

==== Final ====
24 May 2026
16:52

(Hong Kong) HKFC Captain's Select	1–2	Lee Man (Hong Kong)
Anglada		Hui To Yung; Baffoe

Hong Kong Football Club Stadium, Hong Kong

=== Women's Cup ===
==== Semi-finals ====
24 May 2026	(Japan) Urawa Red Diamonds	5–0	HKFA Select (Hong Kong)	Hong Kong
10:54	Sakakibara; Takatsuka; Tanno			Stadium: Hong Kong Football Club Stadium

24 May 2026	(Hong Kong) TSL	2–0	Kitchee (Hong Kong)	Hong Kong
11:12	Leung Hong Kiu Anke; Tsang Lai Mae Halasan			Stadium: Hong Kong Football Club Stadium

==== Final ====
24 May 2026
18:22

(Japan) Urawa Red Diamonds	2–1	TSL (Hong Kong)
Ise; Sakakibara		Leung Hong Kiu Anke

Hong Kong Football Club Stadium, Hong Kong

=== Women's Shield ===
24 May 2026
17:28

(Hong Kong) HKFA Select	1–2	Kitchee (Hong Kong)
Wing Ching Chan		Wai Ki Cheung

Hong Kong Football Club Stadium, Hong Kong

=== Women's Plate ===
==== Semi-finals ====
24 May 2026	(Singapore) Eastern Thunder	3–0	HKFC Captain's Select (Hong Kong)	Hong Kong
08:30	Noinueai; Vicha; Wongcharoen			Stadium: Hong Kong Football Club Stadium

24 May 2026	Hong Kong FC	3–2	Wrexham (Wales)	Hong Kong
08:48	Duvernay; Davis		Morris; Nash	Stadium: Hong Kong Football Club Stadium

==== Final ====
24 May 2026
14:11

(Singapore) Eastern Thunder	1–0	Hong Kong FC
Sawangarom

Hong Kong Football Club Stadium, Hong Kong

=== Masters Cup ===
==== Semi-finals ====
24 May 2026	(Hong Kong) Ampcontrol Discovery Bay	0–1	Singapore FC Masters	Hong Kong
13:17			Albrighton	Stadium: Hong Kong Football Club Stadium

24 May 2026	(England) PFA All Stars	0–2	Yau Yee League Select (Hong Kong)	Hong Kong
13:35			Sagna; Hamšík	Stadium: Hong Kong Football Club Stadium

==== Final ====
24 May 2026
18:04

Singapore FC Masters	0–1	Yau Yee League Select (Hong Kong)
		Klose

Hong Kong Football Club Stadium, Hong Kong

=== Masters Shield ===
24 May 2026
17:10

(Hong Kong) Ampcontrol Discovery Bay	1–0	PFA All Stars (England)
Bala

Hong Kong Football Club Stadium, Hong Kong

=== Masters Plate ===
==== Semi-finals ====
24 May 2026	Singapore Cricket Club Masters	1–3	Wallsend Boys Club Hong Kong	Hong Kong
09:06	Vendesan		Wellingsson; Maronesi	Stadium: Hong Kong Football Club Stadium

24 May 2026	(Hong Kong) HKFC Chairman's Select	0–3	HKFC Masters (Hong Kong)	Hong Kong
09:24			Russell; McArdle; Jeffrey	Stadium: Hong Kong Football Club Stadium

==== Final ====
24 May 2026
13:53

Wallsend Boys Club Hong Kong	1–2	HKFC Masters (Hong Kong)
Giovane		Moreira

Hong Kong Football Club Stadium, Hong Kong
