= 2019 HKFC International Soccer Sevens =

Final positions
- Champions: (England) Newcastle United
- Runners-up: (Scotland) Rangers

2019 HKFC International Soccer Sevens, officially known as The HKFC Citi Soccer Sevens due to sponsorship reasons, is the 20th staging of the HKFC International Soccer Sevens tournament. It was held on 17–19 May 2019. In this edition, there were a number of celebrations to commemorate 20 years of the tournament.

== Competing Teams ==
=== Masters Tournament ===
Group A

- TDW Discovery Bay: Ho Kwok Chuen, Vlamir Soartes, Matija Maretic, Martin Rigby, Kieran McKnight, Bruno Cortes, Pascal Laroumanie, Paul Crompton, Bruno Oliveiro, Gabriel Biscaia, Daniel Cortes
- Citi All Stars: Alan Fettis, Pascal Chimbonda, Alan Dunne, Sean Davis, Marvin Andrews, Carl Heggs, Matt Piper, Jamie Cureton, Darren Currie, Gary Alexander, Ben Chorley
- Nottingham Forest Mobsters: Kevin Pilkington, Jamal Campbell-Ryce, Paul McKenna, John Thompson, Grant Holt, Brett Ormerod, Hayden Mullins, Sam Clingan, Tem Hansen, Martin Tierney
- Singapore Cricket Club Masters: Adam Bowden, Andrew Hutcheon, Owen Monaghan, Amos Boon, Matt Hulen, John Norfolk, Martin Goerojo, Tan Chun Hao, Michael Hemmingway, PJ Roberts, Michael Drake
- HKFC Chairman's Select: Murphy Mok, Jamie Milne, Philip Dowding, Simon Galvin, Stu McInnes, Colin Spanos, Stephen Tew, Rahul Dansanghani, Graeme Lane, Darren McEntee, Danny Beattie

Group B

- Wallsend Boys Club: Steve Harper, John Watson, Dean Beckwith, Luis Corrales, John Gbenda Charles, Matt West, Keith Gillespie, Paul Ifill, Fabio Alcantara, Craig Dundas, Glen Southam
- playonpro: David James, Don Hutchison, Frank Sinclair, Darren Bent, Emile Heskey, Peter Beardsley, Michael Brown, John Arne Riise, Jari Litmanen, George Boateng, Michael Gray
- Eleven FC: Tam Siu Wai, Chan Ka Ki, Lai Kai Cheuk, Poon Yiu Cheuk, Lee Chi Ho, Li Chun Yip, Yoon Dong-hun, Angelo Marcio da Silva Cascao, Aender Naves Mesquita, Chiu Chung Man
- KCC Veterans
- HKFC Masters: Jan Souleyman, Tom McGillycuddy, Anthony Sassi, Adrian Worth, Blake Harding, Paul Fitzgerald, Donny Tse, Fouad Ben Allal, Tom Pugh, Mark Grainger, Rich Le Gallez

=== Main Tournament ===
Group A

- West Ham United: Joseph Anang, Ben Johnson, Jeremy Ngakia, Harrison Ashby, Conor Coventry, Louie Watson, Dan Kemp, Nathan Holland, Sean Adarkwa, Joe Powell
- Fulham: Taye Ashby-Hammond, Cody Drameh, Moritz Jenz, Jerome Opoku, Connor McAvoy, Timmy Abraham, Jayden Harris, Nicolas Santos-Clase, Sonny Hilton, Tyrese Francois
- Portimonense: Nedja, Jamerson, Fali, Koday Nagagima, Ryonsuke Ohori, Sérgio Santos, Sérgio Neto, Iago Oliviera, Gustavo Hebling, Francisco Cardoso
- HKFC Captain's Select: Issey Maholo, Poon Ka Ming, Jorge Ruiz, Sebastian Beer, Shane Jeffery, Andrew Wylde, Calum Eskrine, Calvin Harris, Raphaël Merkies, Michael Hampshire

Group B

- Aston Villa: Ákos Onódi, Isaiah Bazley-Graham, Bradley Burton, Dominic Revan, Lewis Brunt, Jaden Philogene, Aaron Pressley, Jack Clarke, Cameron Archer, Indiana Vassilev
- Leicester City: Viktor Johansson, Luke Thomas, Dennis Gyamfi, Justen Kranthove, Kiernan Dewsbury-Hall, Layton Ndukwu, Sidnei Tavares, Conor Tee, Dempsey Arlott-John, Ryan Loft
- Kitchee
- Singapore Cricket Club: Ronnie Smollett, Khairul Anwar, Jonathan Huang, Tim Walter, Jahan Rezai, Jack Cullinane, Ivor Teagle, Ben King, Chang Guo Guang, Sam Balls

Group C

- Brighton & Hove Albion: Tom McGill, Archie Davies, Alex Cochrane, George Cox, Warren O'Hora, Max Sanders, Jordan Davies, Ryan Longman, Steven Alzate, Ben Wilson
- Newcastle United: Nathan Harker, Owen Bailey, Kelland Watts, Lewis Cass, Matthew Longstaff, Rosaire Longelo, Elias Sørensen, Thomas Allan, Oliver Walters, Luke Charman
- Kashima Antlers:
- Kerry Yau Yee League Select: Aron Ruszel, Daniel Martyn, Dylan McWilliams, Edwin Tizard, Gurung Saraj, Kieran Robinson, Martin Fray, Mathieu Boyer, Peter Smith, Silvio Ruprah

Group D

- Rangers: Nicky Hogarth, Cameron Palmer, Stephen Kelly, Nathan Patterson, Josh McPake, Andrew Dallas, Daniel Finlayson, Kai Kennedy, Jordan Houston, Matthew Shiels
- Wolverhampton Wanderers: Carlos Heredia, Niall Ennis, Ryan Giles, Pedro Gonçalves, Elliot Watt, Ed Francis, Oskar Buur, Cameron John, Dion Sanderson
- Hong Kong Football Club: Freddie Toomer, Callum Beattie, Michael Thurbon, Freek Schipper, Robert Bacon, Robert Scott, Marcus McMillan, Albin Brion, Julian Oes, Jordon Brown, Shunsuke Nakamura
- HKFA Red Dragons

Guest Referees

- Jon Moss
- Mike Riley

== Main Tournament - Group Stage ==
=== Group A ===
P	Team	GP	W	D	L	GF	GA	Pts
1	West Ham United	3	2	1	0	5	1	7
2	Portimonense	3	1	2	0	1	0	5
3	Fulham	3	1	1	1	5	1	4
4	HKFC Captain's Select	3	0	0	3	1	10	0

18 May 2019
15:57

Fulham	0–0	Portimonense

Hong Kong Football Club Stadium

18 May 2019
16:14

West Ham United	4–1	HKFC Captain's Select
Holland; Johnson		Beer

Hong Kong Football Club Stadium

18 May 2019
17:39

West Ham United	1–0	Fulham
Holland

Hong Kong Football Club Stadium

18 May 2019
17:56

Portimonense	1–0	HKFC Captain's Select
Hebling

Hong Kong Football Club Stadium

18 May 2019
18:47

West Ham United	0–0	Portimonense

Hong Kong Football Club Stadium

18 May 2019
19:21

Fulham	5–0	HKFC Captain's Select
Francois; Hilton; McAvoy; Drameh; Abraham

Hong Kong Football Club Stadium

=== Group B ===
P	Team	GP	W	D	L	GF	GA	Pts
1	Leicester City	3	2	1	0	4	1	7
2	Kitchee	3	1	2	0	3	2	5
3	Aston Villa	3	1	1	1	4	2	4
4	Singapore Cricket Club	3	0	0	3	0	6	0

18 May 2019
09:34

Aston Villa	1–1	Kitchee
Clarke		Kim

Hong Kong Football Club Stadium

18 May 2019
09:51

Leicester City	2–0	Singapore Cricket Club
Tee; Dewsbury-Hall

Hong Kong Football Club Stadium

18 May 2019
11:16

Aston Villa	3–0	Singapore Cricket Club
Philogene; Pressley; Brunt

Hong Kong Football Club Stadium

18 May 2019
11:33

Leicester City	1–1	Kitchee
Dewsbury-Hall		Orr

Hong Kong Football Club Stadium

18 May 2019
12:41

Kitchee	1–0	Singapore Cricket Club
Gonçalves

Hong Kong Football Club Stadium

18 May 2019
13:15

Leicester City	1–0	Aston Villa
Loft

Hong Kong Football Club Stadium

=== Group C ===
P	Team	GP	W	D	L	GF	GA	Pts
1	Newcastle United	3	2	1	0	2	0	7
2	Brighton & Hove Albion.	3	1	1	1	1	1	4
3	Kerry Yau Yee League Select ^{α}	3	1	0	2	2	3	3
4	Kashima Antlers	3	1	0	2	2	3	3

^α 3rd and 4th place decided by 4-a-side Golden Goal game. Kerry Yau Yee League Select's goalkeeper, Pete Smith, scored the deciding goal.

18 May 2019
10:08

Brighton & Hove Albion	0–1	Kashima Antlers
		Unknown

Hong Kong Football Club Stadium

18 May 2019
10:25

Newcastle United	1–0	Kerry Yau Yee League Select
Watts

Hong Kong Football Club Stadium

18 May 2019
11:50

Newcastle United	1–0	Kashima Antlers
Sørensen

Hong Kong Football Club Stadium

18 May 2019
12:07

Brighton & Hove Albion	1–0	Kerry Yau Yee League Select
Longman

Hong Kong Football Club Stadium

18 May 2019
12:58

Kashima Antlers	1–2	Kerry Yau Yee League Select
Arima; Kiuchi (red card)		McWilliams; Ruprah

Hong Kong Football Club Stadium

18 May 2019
13:32

Newcastle United	0–0	Brighton & Hove Albion

Hong Kong Football Club Stadium

=== Group D ===
P	Team	GP	W	D	L	GF	GA	Pts
1	Wolverhampton Wanderers^{b}	3	2	1	0	4	1	7
2	Rangers	3	2	1	0	4	1	7
3	Hong Kong Football Club	3	1	0	2	2	4	3
4	HKFA Red Dragons	3	0	0	3	1	4	0

^b 1st and 2nd place decided by 4-a-side Golden Goal game which Wolverhampton Wanderers won.

18 May 2019
15:23

Wolverhampton Wanderers	2–1	HKFA Red Dragons
Ennis; Watt		Yin

Hong Kong Football Club Stadium

18 May 2019
15:40

Rangers	3–1	Hong Kong Football Club
Kennedy; Palmer; McPake		Scott

Hong Kong Football Club Stadium

18 May 2019
17:05

Rangers	0–0	Wolverhampton Wanderers

Hong Kong Football Club Stadium

18 May 2019
17:22

HKFA Red Dragons	0–1	Hong Kong Football Club
		Bacon

Hong Kong Football Club Stadium

18 May 2019
18:30

Rangers	1–0	HKFA Red Dragons
Shiels

Hong Kong Football Club Stadium

18 May 2019
19:04

Wolverhampton Wanderers	2–0	Hong Kong Football Club
Ennis; Heredia

Hong Kong Football Club Stadium

== Main Tournament - Knockout Stage ==
Matches in the knockout stage were now 14 minutes each half, with golden goal extra time and a sudden death penalty shootout in the event of a draw.

=== Plate ===
- Bottom two teams of each group entered the quarter-finals of Plate.

Quarterfinals
A3	Fulham (pen.)	1 (4)
C4	Kashima Antlers	1 (3)
B3	Aston Villa	5
D4	HKFA Red Dragons	2
C3	Kerry Yau Yee League Select (pen.)	0 (10)
A4	HKFC Captain's Select	0 (9)
D3	Hong Kong Football Club	1 (3)
B4	Singapore Cricket Club (pen.)	1 (4)

Semifinals
Fulham	1
Aston Villa	3
Kerry Yau Yee League Select	1
Singapore Cricket Club	0

Finals
Aston Villa	2
Kerry Yau Yee League Select	0

=== Shield ===
- Losing teams of Cup quarter-finals entered the semi-finals of Shield.

Semifinals
Brighton & Hove Albion	2
Leicester City	4
Portimonese	0
Wolverhampton Wanderers	2

Finals
Leicester City	1
Wolverhampton Wanderers (AET)	2

=== Cup ===
- Top two teams of each group entered the quarter-finals of Cup.

Quarterfinals
A1	West Ham United	2
C2	Brighton & Hove Albion	0
B1	Leicester City	2
D2	Rangers (AET)	3
C1	Newcastle United	2
A2	Portimonese	0
D1	Wolverhampton Wanderers	1
B2	Kitchee (AET)	2

Semifinals
West Ham United	0
Rangers (AET)	1
Newcastle United	2
Kitchee	0

Finals
Rangers	3
Newcastle United (AET)	4
