= 2012–13 Hong Kong Second Division League =

Hong Kong Second Division League
- Season: 2012–13
- Champions: Yuen Long
- Promoted: Yuen Long; Happy Valley; Eastern Salon
- Relegated: Sham Shui Po
- Matches: 110
- Goals: 421 (3.83 per match)
- Top goalscorer: Fábio Lopes Alcântara (28 goals)
- Biggest home win: Yuen Long 7–0 Tuen Mun FC
- Biggest away win: Double Flower 1–10 Yuen Long
- Highest scoring: Tai Chung 9–3 Tuen Mun FC
- Longest winning run: 8 games Yuen Long
- Longest unbeaten run: 16 games Yuen Long
- Longest winless run: 15 games Wanchai
- Longest losing run: 8 games Double Flower; Wanchai

2012–13 Hong Kong Second Division League is the 67th season of Hong Kong Second Division League, a football league in Hong Kong.

== Teams ==
=== Change from last season ===
==== From Second Division League ====
Promoted to Hong Kong First Division League

- Kam Fung
- Southern District

Relegated to Second Division League

- Kwun Tong
- Kwai Tsing

==== To Second Division League ====
Relegated from First Division League

- ~~Hong Kong Sapling~~ (disbanded)
- Sham Shui Po

Promoted from Third Division League

- Eastern (renamed as Eastern Salon)
- Tuen Mun FC

=== Team review ===
The following 11 clubs are competing in the Hong Kong Second Division League during the 2012–13 season.

Club	Position in 2011–12	Member since season	Consecutive season in league
Double Flower FA	5th	2002–03	11
Eastern AA	1st in Third Division	2012–13	1
Happy Valley AA	6th	2010–11	3
Hong Kong Football Club	3rd	2011–12	2
Sham Shui Po SA	10th in First Division	2012–13	1
Shatin SA	7th	2010–11	3
Tai Chung FC	8th	2011–12	2
Tuen Mun FC	2nd in Third Division	2012–13	1
Wanchai SF	4th	2011–12	2
Wing Yee FT	10th	2008–09	5
Yuen Long District SA	9th	2010–11	3

== League table ==
Pos	Team	Pld	W	D	L	GF	GA	GD	Pts	Promotion or relegation
1	Yuen Long (C, P)	20	16	3	1	70	15	+55	51	Promotion to First Division
2	Happy Valley (P)	20	13	5	2	54	20	+34	44	Promotion to First Division
3	Eastern Salon (P)	20	12	6	2	41	21	+20	42	Promotion to First Division
4	Tai Chung	20	12	4	4	53	25	+28	40	
5	Hong Kong FC	20	12	1	7	49	33	+16	37	
6	Wing Yee	20	7	6	7	31	39	−8	27	
7	Shatin	20	7	4	9	28	29	−1	25	
8	Wanchai	20	4	3	13	28	44	−16	15	
9	Double Flower	20	3	2	15	19	64	−45	11	
10	Tuen Mun FC	20	3	1	16	32	73	−41	10	
11	Sham Shui Po (R)	20	2	3	15	16	58	−42	9	Relegation to Third Division

Updated to match(es) played on 5 May 2013. Source: Second Division Score Table
Rules for classification: 1) points; 2) head-to-head points; 3) head-to-head goal difference; 4) head-to-head goals scored; 5) goal difference; 6) number of goals scored.
(C) Champions; (P) Promoted; (R) Relegated

== Results table ==
Home \ Away	DFL	EAA	HVA	HKF	SSP	SHA	TAI	TMF	WCH	WYE	YLF
Double Flower		2–4	1–4	1–6	1–1	1–0	2–3	2–1	1–2	2–4	1–10
Eastern	4–0		1–0	1–2	3–0	2–0	1–1	3–1	1–0	2–1	1–5
Happy Valley	5–0	2–2		2–0	3–0	2–2	2–1	7–1	7–4	2–0	2–0
Hong Kong FC	6–3	1–3			6–0	3–1	0–2	4–1	4–1	2–2	0–2
Sham Shui Po	1–1	0–2	0–4	1–3		1–2	1–4	2–4	1–2	1–3	0–7
Shatin	1–0	0–1	0–1	6–0	1–1		1–0	1–5	3–1	0–0	1–2
Tai Chung	5–0	0–0	3–3	1–0	4–0	1–1		9–3	4–2	3–0	0–3
Tuen Mun FC	2–0		0–3	0–4	1–2	1–4	1–5		1–1	3–4	1–2
Wanchai	0–1	0–0	1–2	1–4	2–3	2–3	2–3	3–2		3–1	1–2
Wing Yee	2–0	2–2	1–1	1–4	1–0	2–1	0–3	5–3	0–0		1–8
Yuen Long	3–0	3–3	1–1	3–0	4–1	3–0	3–1	7–0	1–0	1–1	

Updated to match(es) played on 5 May 2013. Source: Second Division League
Legend: Blue = home team win; Yellow = draw; Red = away team win.

== Fixtures and results ==
=== Week 1 ===
9 September 2012	Tai Chung	0–0	Eastern Salon	Wong Tai Sin, Kowloon
13:30 (GMT+8)	Law Man Chung (yellow card) 40'; Li Ling Fung (yellow card) 45'; Lam Tsz Chung (yellow card) 54'; Chan Ho Fung (yellow card) 76'; Tsui Hoi Kin (yellow card) 90'	Report	(yellow card) 27' Lee Ka Wah; (yellow card) 31' Yiu Ho Ming; (yellow card) 33' Wong Wai Tak; (yellow card) 38' (yellow-red card) 85' Leung Chi Wing; (yellow card) 90' Chung Ho Yin	Stadium: Po Kong Village Road Park #1

9 September 2012	Tuen Mun FC	1–4	Shatin	Wong Tai Sin, Kowloon
15:15 (GMT+8)	Lee Wai Leung (yellow card) 59'; Chau Wai Ming (yellow card) 72'; Mok Siu Man 74' (o.g.)	Report	14' (o.g.) Leung Chi Yat; 41' Tong Kin Ming; 49' Kwok Yue Hung; 56' Treschuk	Stadium: Po Kong Village Road Park #1

9 September 2012	Wing Yee	0–0	Wanchai	Shatin, New Territories
15:15 (GMT+8)	Yau Ping Kai (yellow card) 49'; Ng Shung Hei (yellow card) 55'	Report	(yellow card) 23' (yellow-red card) 64' Cheung Ho Leung; (yellow card) 60' Lo Tin Ho	Stadium: Shatin Sports Ground

9 September 2012	Hong Kong FC	6–0	Sham Shui Po	Happy Valley, Hong Kong Island
16:30 (GMT+8)	Gheczy (yellow card) 4'; Bacon 23', 36', 58', 69'; Poon Ka Ming 54'; Schipper 76'	Report		Stadium: Hong Kong Football Club Stadium

9 September 2012	Yuen Long	1–1	Happy Valley	Yuen Long, New Territories
18:30 (GMT+8)	Magnus Leung 48' (yellow card) 72'; Yip Chi Ho (yellow card) 72'	Report	(yellow card) 32' Tse Tin Yau; 71' Fan Weijun	Stadium: Yuen Long Stadium

=== Week 2 ===
16 September 2012	Double Flower	2–1	Tuen Mun FC	Ma On Shan, New Territories
13:30 (GMT+8)	Chan Ming Yuen (yellow card) 6'; John 37', 54'; Yick Cheuk Yiu (yellow card) 52'; Wong Yat Ming (yellow card) 81'	Report	(yellow card) 36' Ip Tsz Lung; 47' Chamard-Boudet	Stadium: Ma On Shan Recreation Ground

16 September 2012	Happy Valley	2–0	Wing Yee	Wong Tai Sin, Kowloon
13:30 (GMT+8)	Lukalu 22' (yellow card) 41'; Benin (yellow card) 65'; Li Chun Yip 90'	Report		Stadium: Po Kong Village Road Park #1

16 September 2012	Shatin	6–0	Hong Kong FC	Ma On Shan, New Territories
15:15 (GMT+8)	Lee Sze Lung 5'; Lau Chun Yu 12'; Treschuk 22'; Ng Hon Ho 26'; Tong Kin Ming (yellow card) 35'; Kwok Chi Kin 68'; Chu Chi Keung 81'	Report		Stadium: Ma On Shan Recreation Ground

16 September 2012	Eastern Salon	1–5	Yuen Long	Wong Tai Sin, Kowloon
15:15 (GMT+8)	Wong Chun Yue 15'; Au Wai Lun (yellow card) 51'; Wong Wai Tak (yellow card) 72' (yellow-red card) 75'; Lo Kai Wah (yellow card) 73' (yellow-red card) 80'; Lee Kin Wo (yellow card) 73' (yellow-red card) 87'	Report	(yellow card) 7' Yan Wai Hong; 24', 38' Yip Chi Ho; (yellow card) 37' Anane; (yellow card) 56' Lau Chi Keung; 58' Chan Hon Hing; 85', 90' Alcantara	Stadium: Po Kong Village Road Park #1

16 September 2012	Sham Shui Po	1–4	Tai Chung	Wong Tai Sin, Kowloon
15:15 (GMT+8)	Wat Kam Ki (yellow card) 7'; Ng Wing Kit (yellow card) 7'; Cheung Wai Chun 74'; Tam Ho Pong (yellow card) 88'	Report	39', 51' Yu Kwok Ho; 60', 82' Chan Ho Fung; (yellow card) 78' Kwong Lai Kin	Stadium: Po Kong Village Road Park #2

=== Week 3 ===
23 September 2012	Double Flower	1–1	Sham Shui Po	Wong Tai Sin, Kowloon
13:30 (GMT+8)	John 54'	Report	78' Wong Chun Lok	Stadium: Po Kong Village Road Park #1

23 September 2012	Tuen Mun FC	1–5	Eastern Salon	Wong Tai Sin, Kowloon
15:15 (GMT+8)	Hung Chi Nam (yellow card) 37'; Chamard-Boudet 86'	Report	20', 26', 33', 48' Yeung Hei Chi; 74' (yellow card) 75' Tse Long Hin; (yellow card) 89' Wong Chun Hin	Stadium: Po Kong Village Road Park #1

23 September 2012	Tai Chung	4–2	Wanchai	Wong Tai Sin, Kowloon
15:15 (GMT+8)	Chow Cheuk Hong (yellow card) 28'; Yu Kwok Ho 37'; Liu Tsan Shu 47'; Li Ling Fung 53' (yellow card) 59'; Ho Min Tong 74'	Report	(yellow card) 44' Lam Chi Ho; 64' Law Chun Yan; 78' Chui Wan Yeung; (yellow card) 87' Lee Siu Cheung	Stadium: Po Kong Village Road Park #2

23 September 2012	Hong Kong FC	2–1	Happy Valley	Happy Valley, Hong Kong Island
16:30 (GMT+8)		Report		Stadium: Hong Kong Football Club Stadium

28 December 2012 Postponed	Yuen Long	1–1	Wing Yee	Yuen Long, New Territories
20:30 (GMT+8)		Report		Stadium: Yuen Long Stadium

=== Week 4 ===
30 September 2012	Happy Valley	7–1	Tuen Mun FC	Kowloon City, Kowloon
13:30 (GMT+8)	Lukalu 36', 39', 88'; Nyatepe 52'; Fan Weijun 54', 75', 84'	Report	17' Or Ho Yin	Stadium: Kowloon Tsai Sports Ground

30 September 2012	Wing Yee	0–3	Tai Chung	Happy Valley, Hong Kong Island
13:30 (GMT+8)	Ngassa Martial (yellow card) 55' (yellow-red card) 78'	Report	42' Law Man Chung; (yellow card) 43' Chan Ho Fung; 88' Yu Kwok Ho; 90' Hinson Leung	Stadium: Happy Valley #6

30 September 2012	Sham Shui Po	1–2	Shatin	Kowloon City, Kowloon
15:15 (GMT+8)	Wong Chun Man (yellow card) 40' (yellow-red card) 44'; Lam Chun Hung (yellow card) 50'; Luk Yip Hong (yellow card) 56'; Tam Ho Pong (yellow card) 57'; Ma Man Chun 75'; Ng Wing Kit (yellow card) 78'	Report	10' Kwok Chi Kin; (yellow card) 74' Kwok Wing Lok; 81' Lau Chun Yu; (yellow card) 88' Law Pui Yuen	Stadium: Kowloon Tsai Sports Ground

30 September 2012	Wanchai	1–4	Hong Kong FC	Happy Valley, Hong Kong Island
15:15 (GMT+8)	Ho Tsz Fat (yellow card) 26' (goal) 30'; Lee Siu Cheung (yellow card) 42'; Yu Kin Leung (yellow card) 87'	Report	21', 58' (yellow card) 54' Schipper; (yellow card) 24' Mcentee; (yellow card) 30' Maholo; (yellow card) 35' Freser; (yellow card) 53' Abbas; 76' Beacher; 83' White	Stadium: Happy Valley #6

30 September 2012	Eastern Salon	4–0	Double Flower	Tsing Yi, New Territories
15:15 (GMT+8)	Wong Tsz Ho 7'; Wong Chun Yue 12'; Yu Pui Hong 21'; Yiu Ho Ming 68'; Lee Ka Wah (yellow card) 81'	Report	(yellow card) 41' (yellow-red card) 66' Tam Kin Wa; (yellow card) 60' Lau Yip Wa; (yellow card) 71' Lui Wai Chiu	Stadium: Tsing Yi Northeast Park

=== Week 5 ===
7 October 2012	Happy Valley	2–2	Shatin	Kowloon City, Kowloon
13:30 (GMT+8)	Lukalu 7' (yellow card) 74'; So Sheung Kwai (yellow card) 45'; Fan Weijun 90'	Report	(yellow card) 11' Lai Chun Kit; 45' Ng Hon Ho; 51' (pen.) Treschuk	Stadium: Kowloon Tsai Sports Ground

7 October 2012	Wing Yee	5–3	Tuen Mun FC	Happy Valley, Hong Kong Island
13:30 (GMT+8)	Qehaja 24' (pen.); Yau Ping Kai 33', 43', 60'; Chau Chi Ming 52'	Report	32' Leung Chi Yat; 45', 85' Sin Chi Ho; (yellow card) 70' Chamard-Boudet; (yellow card) 89' Lee Siu Pong	Stadium: Happy Valley #6

7 October 2012	Eastern Salon	3–0	Sham Shui Po	Kowloon City, Kowloon
15:15 (GMT+8)	Wong Tsz Ho 28'; Yiu Hok Man 78', 81' (pen.)	Report	(yellow card) 80' Ng Wing Kit	Stadium: Kowloon Tsai Sports Ground

7 October 2012	Wanchai	0–1	Double Flower	Happy Valley, Hong Kong Island
15:15 (GMT+8)	Yu Kin Leung (yellow card) 77'	Report	57' John	Stadium: Happy Valley #6

7 October 2012	Yuen Long	3–0	Hong Kong FC	Yuen Long, New Territories
18:30 (GMT+8)	Fabio 43', 62' (pen.); Cheung Tsz Kin (yellow card) 51'; Ngai Pok Keung 58'	Report	(yellow card) 62' Kawasaki	Stadium: Yuen Long Stadium

=== Week 6 ===
14 October 2012	Sham Shui Po	1–3	Wing Yee	Wong Tai Sin, Kowloon
12:15 (GMT+8)	Wat Kam Ki (yellow card) 56'; Ng Wing Kit (yellow card) 56'; Cheung Wai Chun 68'; Lee Ka Yeung (yellow card) 75'	Report	47', 76' (pen.) (yellow card) 55' Qehaja; (yellow card) 48' Chu Wai San; 49' Mak Ka-Kuen; (yellow card) 56' Lai Chun Ho	Stadium: Po Kong Village Road Park #1

21 October 2012	Shatin	1–2	Yuen Long	Ma On Shan, New Territories
13:30 (GMT+8)	Lee Sze Lung (yellow card) 26'; Ng Hon Ho 29'; Tong Kin Ming (yellow card) 32'	Report	38' Fábio; (yellow card) 45' Chan Hon Hing; 47' Celistanus Chou; (yellow card) 67' Ngai Pok Keung; (yellow card) 84' Yan Minghao	Stadium: Ma On Shan Recreation Ground

21 October 2012	Double Flower	2–3	Tai Chung	Wong Tai Sin, Kowloon
13:30 (GMT+8)	Cheng Ka Ho (yellow card) 18'; Law Fu Shing (yellow card) 47'; Lau Tsz Leung (yellow card) 49'; John 53'; Lau Yip Wa (yellow card) 66'; Leung Sun Chi 69'	Report	(yellow card) 47' Ho Min Tong; 80' Chan Ho Fung; (yellow card) 81' Kwong Lai Kin; 88' Wu Kwong Yuen; 90' (o.g.) Lau Yip Wa	Stadium: Po Kong Village Road Park #1

21 October 2012	Tuen Mun FC	0–4	Hong Kong FC	Ma On Shan, New Territories
15:15 (GMT+8)	Law Chun Yeung (yellow card) 66'	Report	9' Bacon; 29' Beacher; 70' Freser; 74' Halder; (yellow card) 84' Dilibero	Stadium: Ma On Shan Recreation Ground

21 October 2012	Eastern Salon	1–0	Wanchai	Wong Tai Sin, Kowloon
15:15 (GMT+8)	Lee Sze Ming 40'; Wong Wai Tak (yellow card) 44'; Yeung Hei Chi (yellow card) 55'	Report	(yellow card) 63' Yu Kin Leung	Stadium: Po Kong Village Road Park #1

=== Week 7 ===
28 October 2012	Happy Valley	2–1	Tai Chung	Happy Valley, Hong Kong Island
13:30 (GMT+8)	Anthony 12' (yellow card) 84'; Tse Tin Yau (yellow card) 33'; Li Chun Yip 34'	Report	57' Ip Kwok Hei	Stadium: Happy Valley #6

28 October 2012	Wanchai	1–2	Yuen Long	Happy Valley, Hong Kong Island
15:15 (GMT+8)	Lo Tin Ho (yellow card) 30'; Luk Pak Hei 43'; Lam Chi Ho (yellow card) 68'	Report	22' Yuen Lap Cheung; 70' Yan Minghao	Stadium: Happy Valley #6

28 October 2012	Eastern Salon	1–2	Hong Kong FC	Wong Tai Sin, Kowloon
15:15 (GMT+8)	Lee Sze Ming (yellow card) 27'; Yeung Hei Chi 29'; Lau Ho Lam (yellow card) 84'	Report	(yellow card) 35' Scott; 73' Halder; 88' Bacon	Stadium: Po Kong Village Road Park #1

28 October 2012	Shatin	1–0	Double Flower	Ma On Shan, New Territories
15:15 (GMT+8)	Treschuk 89' (pen.)	Report	(yellow card) 79' Lau Yip Wa; (yellow card) 86' Tam Kin Wa; (yellow card) 90' Lam Wan Kit	Stadium: Ma On Shan Recreation Ground

28 October 2012	Sham Shui Po	2–4	Tuen Mun FC	Kowloon City, Kowloon
15:15 (GMT+8)	Lee Ka Yeung (yellow card) 31' (yellow-red card) 77'; Chan Sheung Yin 49'; Choi Tsz Yin 70'; Wong Chun Man (yellow card) 83'; Ma Man Chun (yellow card) 86'	Report	6' Li Kwok Pan; 10' (o.g.) Leung Hon Fai; (red card) 56' Chau Wai Ming; 61' Leung Chi Yat; 79' Sin Chi Ho	Stadium: Kowloon Tsai Sports Ground

=== Week 8 ===
4 November 2012	Tai Chung	1–1	Shatin	Happy Valley, Hong Kong Island
13:30 (GMT+8)	Ip Kwok Hei 22'; Chan Man Chun (yellow card) 72'; Chow Cheuk Hong (yellow card) 83'	Report	53' Ng Hon Ho	Stadium: Happy Valley #6

4 November 2012	Wanchai	1–2	Happy Valley	Happy Valley, Hong Kong Island
15:15 (GMT+8)	Luk Pak Hei 90'	Report	13' So Sheung Kwai; (yellow card) 40' Tse Tin Yau; 76' Lukalu; (yellow card) 89' So Hong Shing	Stadium: Happy Valley #6

4 November 2012	Wing Yee	2–2	Eastern Salon	Tsing Yi, New Territories
15:15 (GMT+8)	Kwan Yu Kin (yellow card) 7'; Qehaja 75'; Yau Ping Kai 85'	Report	(yellow card) 46' Leung Chi Wing; 51' Yiu Ho Ming; 58' Yeung Hei Chi	Stadium: Tsing Yi Northeast Park

4 November 2012	Hong Kong FC	6–3	Double Flower	Happy Valley, Hong Kong Island
16:30 (GMT+8)	Bacon 14', 54', 90' (yellow card) 25'; Maholo (red card) 36'; Fraser 45' (pen.), 89' (pen.); Smith (yellow card) 47'; Abbas 52'	Report	(yellow card) 45' Cheng Ka Ho; 63' (yellow card) 78'Lau Tsz Leung; 68' Tam Kin Wa; (yellow card) 72' Lau Yip Wa; 90' Lam Wan Kit; (yellow card) 90' Chan Ming Yuen	Stadium: Hong Kong Football Club Stadium

4 November 2012	Yuen Long	4–1	Sham Shui Po	Yuen Long, New Territories
18:30 (GMT+8)	Fábio 51', 65'; Yuen Lap Cheung 61' (yellow card) 81'; Hon Shing 68'	Report	(yellow card) 39' Ma Man Chun; (yellow card) 57' Leung Hon Fai; (yellow card) 72' Ng Wing Kit; (yellow card) 76' Luk Yip Hong; 80' Cheung Wai Chun	Stadium: Yuen Long Stadium

=== Week 9 ===
11 November 2012	Wing Yee	2–1	Shatin	Happy Valley, Hong Kong Island
13:30 (GMT+8)		Report		Stadium: Happy Valley #6

11 November 2012	Tai Chung	9–3	Tuen Mun FC	Ma On Shan, New Territories
13:30 (GMT+8)	Li Ling Fung (yellow card) 9'; Yu Kwok Ho 14', 15', 57', 83'; Roberto 36', 77'; Ip Kwok Hei 49'; Lam Tsz Chung 85'; Law Chun Yeung 90' (o.g.)	Report	2', 58' Sin Chi Ho; 30' Li Kwok Pan	Stadium: Ma On Shan Recreation Ground

11 November 2012	Wanchai	2–3	Sham Shui Po	Happy Valley, Hong Kong Island
15:15 (GMT+8)		Report		Stadium: Happy Valley #6

11 November 2012	Happy Valley	2–2	Eastern Salon	Ma On Shan, New Territories
15:15 (GMT+8)		Report		Stadium: Ma On Shan Recreation Ground

11 November 2012	Yuen Long	3–0	Double Flower	Yuen Long, New Territories
18:30 (GMT+8)		Report		Stadium: Yuen Long Stadium

=== Week 10 ===
18 November 2012	Double Flower	2–4	Wing Yee	Wong Tai Sin, Kowloon
13:30 (GMT+8)		Report		Stadium: Po Kong Village Road Park #1

18 November 2012	Tuen Mun FC	1–2	Yuen Long	Ma On Shan, New Territories
13:30 (GMT+8)		Report		Stadium: Ma On Shan Recreation Ground

18 November 2012	Sham Shui Po	0–4	Happy Valley	Wong Tai Sin, Kowloon
15:15 (GMT+8)		Report		Stadium: Po Kong Village Road Park #1

18 November 2012	Shatin	3–1	Wanchai	Ma On Shan, New Territories
15:15 (GMT+8)		Report		Stadium: Ma On Shan Recreation Ground

18 November 2012	Hong Kong FC	0–2	Tai Chung	Happy Valley, Hong Kong Island
16:30 (GMT+8)		Report		Stadium: Hong Kong Football Club Stadium

=== Week 11 ===
25 November 2012	Tai Chung	0–3	Yuen Long	Happy Valley, Hong Kong Island
13:30 (GMT+8)		Report		Stadium: Happy Valley #6

25 November 2012	Double Flower	1–4	Happy Valley	Happy Valley, Hong Kong Island
15:15 (GMT+8)		Report		Stadium: Happy Valley #6

25 November 2012	Hong Kong FC	2–2	Wing Yee	Happy Valley, Hong Kong Island
16:30 (GMT+8)		Report		Stadium: Hong Kong Football Club Stadium

2 December 2012	Tuen Mun FC	1–1	Wanchai	Ma On Shan, New Territories
13:30 (GMT+8)		Report		Stadium: Ma On Shan Recreation Ground

2 December 2012	Shatin	0–1	Eastern Salon	Ma On Shan, New Territories
15:15 (GMT+8)		Report		Stadium: Ma On Shan Recreation Ground

=== Week 12 ===
3 February 2013	Tuen Mun FC	0–3	Happy Valley	Tuen Mun, New Territories
13:30 (GMT+8)		Report		Stadium: Siu Lun Sports Ground

3 February 2013	Tai Chung	3–0	Wing Yee	Ma On Shan, New Territories
13:30 (GMT+8)		Report		Stadium: Ma On Shan Sports Ground

3 February 2013	Shatin	1–1	Sham Shui Po	Ma On Shan, New Territories
15:30 (GMT+8)		Report		Stadium: Ma On Shan Sports Ground

3 February 2013	Double Flower	2–4	Eastern Salon	Tsing Yi, New Territories
15:30 (GMT+8)		Report		Stadium: Tsing Yi Northeast Park

3 February 2013	Hong Kong FA	4–1	Wanchai	Tsing Yi, New Territories
16:30 (GMT+8)		Report		Stadium: Tsing Yi Northeast Park

=== Week 13 ===
3 February 2013	Tuen Mun FC	2–0	Double Flower	Tin Shui Wai, New Territories
13:30 (GMT+8)		Report		Stadium: Tin Shui Wai Sports Ground

3 February 2013	Tai Chung	4–0	Sham Shui Po	Wong Tai Sin, Kowloon
13:30 (GMT+8)		Report		Stadium: Po Kong Village Road Park #1

3 February 2013	Wing Yee	1–1	Happy Valley	Wong Tai Sin, Kowloon
15:30 (GMT+8)		Report		Stadium: Po Kong Village Road Park #1

3 February 2013	Hong Kong FC	3–1	Shatin	Happy Valley, Hong Kong Island
16:30 (GMT+8)		Report		Stadium: Hong Kong Football Club Stadium

3 February 2013	Yuen Long	3–3	Eastern Salon	Yuen Long, New Territories
18:30 (GMT+8)		Report		Stadium: Yuen Long Stadium

=== Week 14 ===
24 February 2013	Wing Yee	1–8	Yuen Long	Happy Valley, Hong Kong Island
13:30 (GMT+8)		Report		Stadium: Happy Valley #6

24 February 2013	Eastern Salon	3–1	Tuen Mun FC	Wong Tai Sin, Kowloon
15:30 (GMT+8)		Report		Stadium: Po Kong Village Road Park #1

24 February 2013	Happy Valley	2–0	Hong Kong FC	Tsing Yi, New Territories
15:30 (GMT+8)		Report		Stadium: Tsing Yi Northeast Park

31 March 2013 Rescheduled	Sham Shui Po	1–1	Double Flower	Tsing Yi, New Territories
13:30 (GMT+8)		Report		Stadium: Tsing Yi Northeast Park

31 March 2013 Rescheduled	Wanchai	2–3	Tai Chung	Causeway Bay, Hong Kong Island
15:30 (GMT+8)		Report		Stadium: Causeway Bay Sports Ground

=== Week 15 ===
3 March 2013	Tuen Mun FC	1–2	Sham Shui Po	Tuen Mun, New Territories
13:30 (GMT+8)		Report		Stadium: Tuen Mun Siu Lun Sports Ground

3 March 2013	Tai Chung	3–3	Happy Valley	Happy Valley, Hong Kong Island
13:30 (GMT+8)		Report		Stadium: Happy Valley #6

3 March 2013	Double Flower	1–0	Shatin	Happy Valley, Hong Kong Island
15:30 (GMT+8)		Report		Stadium: Happy Valley #6

3 March 2013	Hong Kong FC	1–3	Eastern Salon	Happy Valley, Hong Kong Island
16:30 (GMT+8)		Report		Stadium: Hong Kong Football Club Stadium

3 March 2013	Yuen Long	1–0	Wanchai	Yuen Long, New Territories
18:30 (GMT+8)		Report		Stadium: Yuen Long Stadium

=== Week 16 ===
10 February 2013	Double Flower	1–6	Hong Kong FC	Ma On Shan, New Territories
13:30 (GMT+8)		Report		Stadium: Ma On Shan Sports Ground

10 February 2013	Sham Shui Po	0–7	Yuen Long	Wong Tai Sin, Kowloon
13:30 (GMT+8)		Report		Stadium: Po Kong Village Road Park #1

10 February 2013	Shatin	1–0	Tai Chung	Ma On Shan, New Territories
15:30 (GMT+8)		Report		Stadium: Ma On Shan Sports Ground

10 February 2013	Eastern Salon	2–1	Wing Yee	Wong Tai Sin, Kowloon
15:30 (GMT+8)		Report		Stadium: Po Kong Village Road Park #1

10 February 2013	Happy Valley	7–4	Wanchai	Wong Tai Sin, Kowloon
15:30 (GMT+8)		Report		Stadium: Po Kong Village Road Park #2

=== Week 17 ===
17 March 2013	Tai Chung	1–0	Hong Kong FC	Happy Valley, Hong Kong Island
13:30 (GMT+8)		Report		Stadium: Happy Valley #6

17 March 2013	Wanchai	2–3	Shatin	Happy Valley, Hong Kong Island
15:30 (GMT+8)		Report		Stadium: Happy Valley #6

17 March 2013	Wing Yee	2–0	Double Flower	Wong Tai Sin, Kowloon
15:30 (GMT+8)		Report		Stadium: Po Kong Village Road Park #1

17 March 2013	Yuen Long	7–0	Tuen Mun FC	Yuen Long, New Territories
18:30 (GMT+8)		Report		Stadium: Yuen Long Stadium

14 April 2013 Rescheduled	Happy Valley	3–0	Sham Shui Po	Sham Shui Po, Kowloon
15:30 (GMT+8)		Report		Stadium: Tai Hang Tung #2

=== Week 18 ===
24 March 2013	Tuen Mun FC	1–5	Tai Chung	Ma On Shan, New Territories
13:30 (GMT+8)		Report		Stadium: Ma On Shan Sports Ground

24 March 2013	Double Flower	1–10	Yuen Long	Wong Tai Sin, Kowloon
13:30 (GMT+8)		Report		Stadium: Po Kong Village Road Park #1

24 March 2013	Shatin	0–0	Wing Yee	Ma On Shan, New Territories
15:30 (GMT+8)		Report		Stadium: Ma On Shan Sports Ground

24 March 2013	Eastern Salon	1–0	Happy Valley	Wong Tai Sin, Kowloon
15:30 (GMT+8)		Report		Stadium: Po Kong Village Road Park #1

24 April 2013 Rescheduled	Sham Shui Po	1–2	Wanchai	Shek Kip Mei, Kowloon
20:30 (GMT+8)		Report		Stadium: Shek Kip Mei Park

=== Week 19 ===
7 April 2013	Tuen Mun FC	3–4	Wing Yee	Happy Valley, Hong Kong Island
13:30 (GMT+8)		Report		Stadium: Happy Valley #6

7 April 2013	Double Flower	1–2	Wanchai	Ma On Shan, New Territories
13:30 (GMT+8)		Report		Stadium: Ma On Shan Sports Ground

7 April 2013	Sham Shui Po	0–2	Eastern Salon	Happy Valley, Hong Kong Island
15:30 (GMT+8)		Report		Stadium: Happy Valley #6

7 April 2013	Shatin	0–1	Happy Valley	Ma On Shan, New Territories
15:30 (GMT+8)		Report		Stadium: Ma On Shan Sports Ground

7 April 2013	Hong Kong FC	0–2	Yuen Long	Happy Valley, Hong Kong Island
16:30 (GMT+8)		Report		Stadium: Hong Kong Football Club Stadium

=== Week 20 ===
21 April 2013	Wing Yee	1–0	Sham Shui Po	Wong Tai Sin, Kowloon
13:30 (GMT+8)		Report		Stadium: Po Kong Village Road Park #1

21 April 2013	Tai Chung	5–0	Double Flower	Wong Tai Sin, Kowloon
15:30 (GMT+8)		Report		Stadium: Po Kong Village Road Park #1

21 April 2013	Wanchai	0–0	Eastern Salon	Happy Valley, Hong Kong Island
15:30 (GMT+8)		Report		Stadium: Happy Valley #6

21 April 2013	Hong Kong FC	4–1	Tuen Mun FC	Happy Valley, Hong Kong Island
16:30 (GMT+8)		Report		Stadium: Hong Kong Football Club Stadium

21 April 2013	Yuen Long	3–0	Shatin	Yuen Long, New Territories
18:30 (GMT+8)		Report		Stadium: Yuen Long Stadium

=== Week 21 ===
28 April 2013	Happy Valley	2–0	Yuen Long	[Happy Valley, Hong Kong Island
13:30 (GMT+8)		Report		Stadium: Happy Valley #6

28 April 2013	Eastern Salon	1–1	Tai Chung	Ma On Shan, New Territories
13:30 (GMT+8)		Report		Stadium: Ma On Shan Sports Ground

28 April 2013	Wanchai	3–1	Wing Yee	Happy Valley, Hong Kong Island
15:30 (GMT+8)		Report		Stadium: Happy Valley #6

28 April 2013	Sham Shui Po	1–3	Hong Kong FC	Wong Tai Sin, Kowloon
15:30 (GMT+8)		Report		Stadium: Po Kong Village Road Park #1

28 April 2013	Shatin	1–5	Tuen Mun FC	Ma On Shan, New Territories
15:30 (GMT+8)		Report		Stadium: Ma On Shan Sports Ground

=== Week 22 ===
5 May 2013	Wanchai	3–2	Tuen Mun FC	Happy Valley, Hong Kong Island
14:00 (GMT+8)		Report		Stadium: Happy Valley #6

5 May 2013	Eastern Salon	2–0	Shatin	Kowloon City, Kowloon
14:00 (GMT+8)		Report		Stadium: Kowloon Tsai Sports Ground

5 May 2013	Happy Valley	5–0	Double Flower	Tsing Yi, New Territories
14:00 (GMT+8)		Report		Stadium: Tsing Yi Northeast Park

5 May 2013	Wing Yee	1–2	Hong Kong FC	Tai Po, New Territories
14:00 (GMT+8)		Report		Stadium: Kwong Fuk Park

5 May 2013	Yuen Long	3–1	Tai Chung	Yuen Long, New Territories
14:00 (GMT+8)		Report		Stadium: Yuen Long Stadium

== Season statistics ==
=== Top scorers ===
Rank	Player	Club	Goals
1	Fábio Lopes Alcântara	Yuen Long	28
2	Muenyi Lukalu	Happy Valley	18
3	Robert Bacon	Hong Kong FC	16
4	Yu Kwok Ho	Tai Chung	15
5	Emmanuel John	Double Flower	12
6	Sin Chi Ho	Tuen Mun FC	11
7	Yeung Hei Chi	Eastern Salon	9
7	Yiu Hok Man	Eastern Salon	9
7	Ng Hon Ho	Shatin	9
10	Roberto Losada	Tai Chung	8
10	Yip Kwok Hei	Tai Chung	8
