= Hugo Moreira =

Hugo Moreira may refer to:

- Hugo Moreira (footballer, born 1982), Portuguese footballer
- Hugo Moreira (footballer, born 1990), Portuguese footballer
