= 2003 FESPIC Youth Games =

1st and only Asia Pacific regional youth disabled multi-sport event held in Hong Kong

I FESPIC Youth Games
- Host city: Hong Kong
- Motto: Let the Youths Lead the Way
- Nations: 15
- Athletes: 314
- Sport: 5
- Opening: 23 September
- Closing: 27 September
- Opened by: Tung Chee Hwa
- Main venue: Ma On Shan Sports Ground
- Website: 2003 FESPIC Youth Games

2003 FESPIC Youth Games, the 1st and only FESPIC Youth Games in history(Chinese: 2003年第一屆遠東和南太平洋地區青年殘疾人運動會、2003年第一届远东和南太平洋地区青年残疾人运动会、第一屆遠南青殘會、第一届远南青残会), were an Asia Pacific regional youth disabled multi-sport event held in Hong Kong, China from 23 to 27 September 2003. Around 314 athletes from 15 participating nations participated at the games which featured 5 sports. Hong Kong is the only nation that had hosted the FESPIC Youth Games, and it was the first and only time Hong Kong hosted the event. The games were opened by Tung Chee Hwa at the Ma On Shan Sports Ground. In 2006, both the FESPIC organisation and the event were officially defunct and succeeded by the Asian Paralympic Committee and the Asian Youth Para Games respectively.

== Organisation ==
=== Development and preparation ===
The 2003 FESPIC Youth Games Organising Committee was formed to oversee the staging of the games.

=== Venues ===
City	Competition Venue	Sports
Hong Kong
Hong Kong	Ma On Shan Sports Ground	Athletics, Opening and closing ceremony
Hong Kong	Kowloon Park Sports Centre	Badminton, Table tennis
Hong Kong	Yuen Wo Road Sports Centre	Boccia
Hong Kong	Kowloon Park Swimming Pool	Swimming

== The games ==
=== Participating nations ===
- China (41)
- Hong Kong (75)
- India (6)
- Indonesia (5)
- Japan (29)
- South Korea (29)
- Macau (9)
- Malaysia (48)
- Philippines (4)
- Singapore (19)
- Sri Lanka (7)
- Thailand (20)
- Tonga (1)
- Chinese Taipei (6)
- Vietnam (3)

=== Sports ===
- Athletics
- Badminton
- Boccia
- Swimming
- Table tennis

=== Medal table ===
* Host nation (Hong Kong)

Rank	Nation	Gold	Silver	Bronze	Total
1	China (CHN)	74	18	3	95
2	Malaysia (MAS)	36	36	27	99
3	Japan (JPN)	31	16	10	57
4	Hong Kong (HKG)	29	46	39	114
5	South Korea (KOR)	19	19	8	46
6	Thailand (THA)	16	24	12	52
7	Chinese Taipei (TPE)	10	8	3	21
8	Macau (MAC)	8	2	4	14
9	Vietnam (VIE)	7	2	3	12
10	India (IND)	5	9	10	24
11	Singapore (SIN)	3	5	6	14
12	Sri Lanka (SRI)	0	5	6	11
13	Indonesia (INA)	0	2	1	3
14	Philippines (PHI)	0	1	1	2
15	Tonga (TGA)	0	0	0	0
Totals (15 entries)		238	193	133	564
