= Daniel Man =

Welsh former footballer

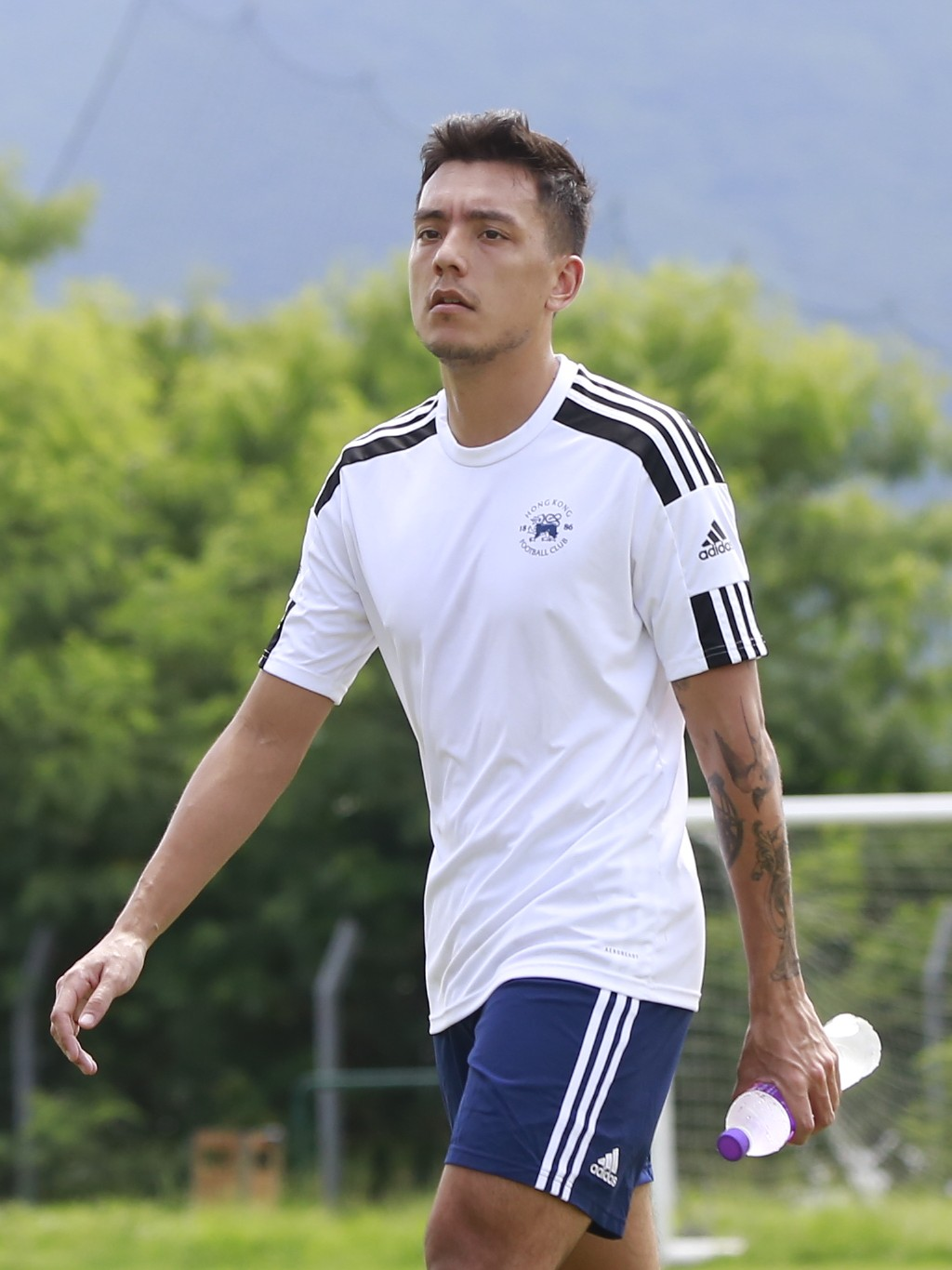

Personal information
- Full name: Daniel Man Ga Wing
- Date of birth: 29 July 1994 (age 32)
- Place of birth: Wales
- Height: 1.80 m (5 ft 11 in)
- Positions: Forward; attacking midfielder

Senior career*
Years	Team	Apps	(Gls)
2015	Marbella FC B	7	(0)
2016	San Pedro B	9	(0)
2016–2017	HKFC	17	(1)
2017–2018	Lee Man	8	(0)
2020	Sham Shui Po	2	(0)
2022	Lung Moon	0	(0)
2022–2023	Lucky Mile	23	(19)
2023–2024	HKFC	9	(0)
- * Club domestic league appearances and goals

Daniel Man (Chinese: 文家永; born 29 June 1994) is a former Welsh professional footballer who played as a forward.

== Club career ==
Man started his career with Spanish seventh tier side Marbella FC B. Before the second half of 2015–16, he signed for San Pedro B in the Spanish sixth tier.

In 2016, Man signed for Hong Kong top flight club HKFC, where he made 19 league appearances and scored 1 goal. On 9 September 2016, he debuted for HKFC during a 1–2 loss to Tai Po. On 17 February 2017, Man scored his first goal for HKFC during a 3–4 loss to R&F.

Before the second half of 2019–20, he signed for Sham Shui Po in the Hong Kong second tier.

On 29 July 2023, Man returned to the top tier and joined HKFC.

== International career ==
Born to a Hong Kong father and Welsh mother, Man was eligible to represent Hong Kong and Wales.
