= Fiachra McArdle =

Irish footballer

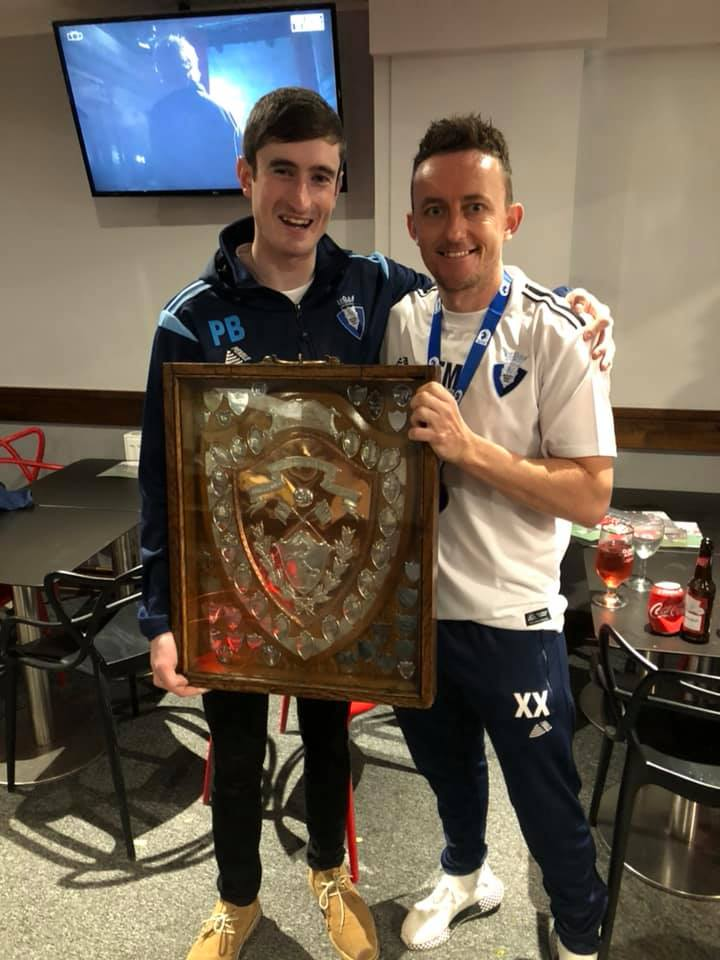
- Fiachra (right) and teammate Padraig Biggane after winning the 2018–19 Kent Intermediate Challenge Shield with South East Athletic

Personal information
- Date of birth: 18 August 1984 (age 42)
- Place of birth: Dundalk, Ireland
- Position: Midfielder

Youth career
- 1998–2002: Derby County

Senior career*
Years	Team	Apps	(Gls)
2004	Shamrock Rovers	7	(0)
2005	Dundalk	1	(0)
2005	Athlone Town	12	(1)
2006	Dundalk	2	(0)
2007	Kildare County	18	(1)
2008–2009	Sporting Fingal	33	(2)
2010	Longford Town	12	(2)
2010	Western Knights		
2011	Sunshine George Cross		
2014	Redhill		
2018	South East Athletic		
- * Club domestic league appearances and goals

Fiachra McArdle (born 18 August 1983 in Dundalk) is a former professional footballer, who played most of his career in the League of Ireland.

The midfield player joined English outfit Derby County as a 15-year-old in 1998. He progressed through the club's academy and won a reserve Premier League medal in 2001. He was promoted to Derby's first-team squad, however he failed to make an appearance, returning home in 2002.

On his return to Ireland he was signed by then Shamrock Rovers manager Liam Buckley and played for Rovers in the Eircom Premier Division before suffering a bad knee injury. He made a total of nine appearances. His debut was at Bray on 10 May 2004 in a League Cup clash. His League of Ireland debut was against Drogheda United on 4 June.

McArdle linked up with hometown club Dundalk and had two spells there sandwiched by a six-month spell at Athlone Town. McArdle represented Ireland at U18, U19, and U21 level, and was part of the squad which competed in the Japan Cup in 2001.

In 2007 McArdle joined Kildare County but made only 17 appearances during that season, due to a broken collarbone which he sustained in his first match for the club against his former club Athlone Town. McArdle signed a new contract with Kildare County during the 2007 close season keeping him at the club for the 2008 season. However, he still departed the club for Sporting Fingal just before the 2008 season. In 2009 McArdle helped Sporting Fingal to win the FAI Cup and promotion to the Premier Division of the League of Ireland.

McArdle joined his sixth League of Ireland club, Longford Town, in January 2010. McArdle then moved to Australia with Perth-based club Western Knights. There McArdle won the NPL Western Australia in 2010. He then moved to Melbourne side Sunshine George Cross in 2011 before returning to the UK to complete his studies.

After completing his studies, McArdle became a teacher in east London. Whilst living in the UK, McArdle played for teams including Isthmian League side Redhill, and Kent County League club South East Athletic. After living in London, McArdle moved to Hong Kong, where he still plays amateur football.

== Honours ==
- FAI Cup:
  - Sporting Fingal - 2009
