= Ma On Shan Sports Ground =

Sports ground in Ma On Shan, Hong Kong

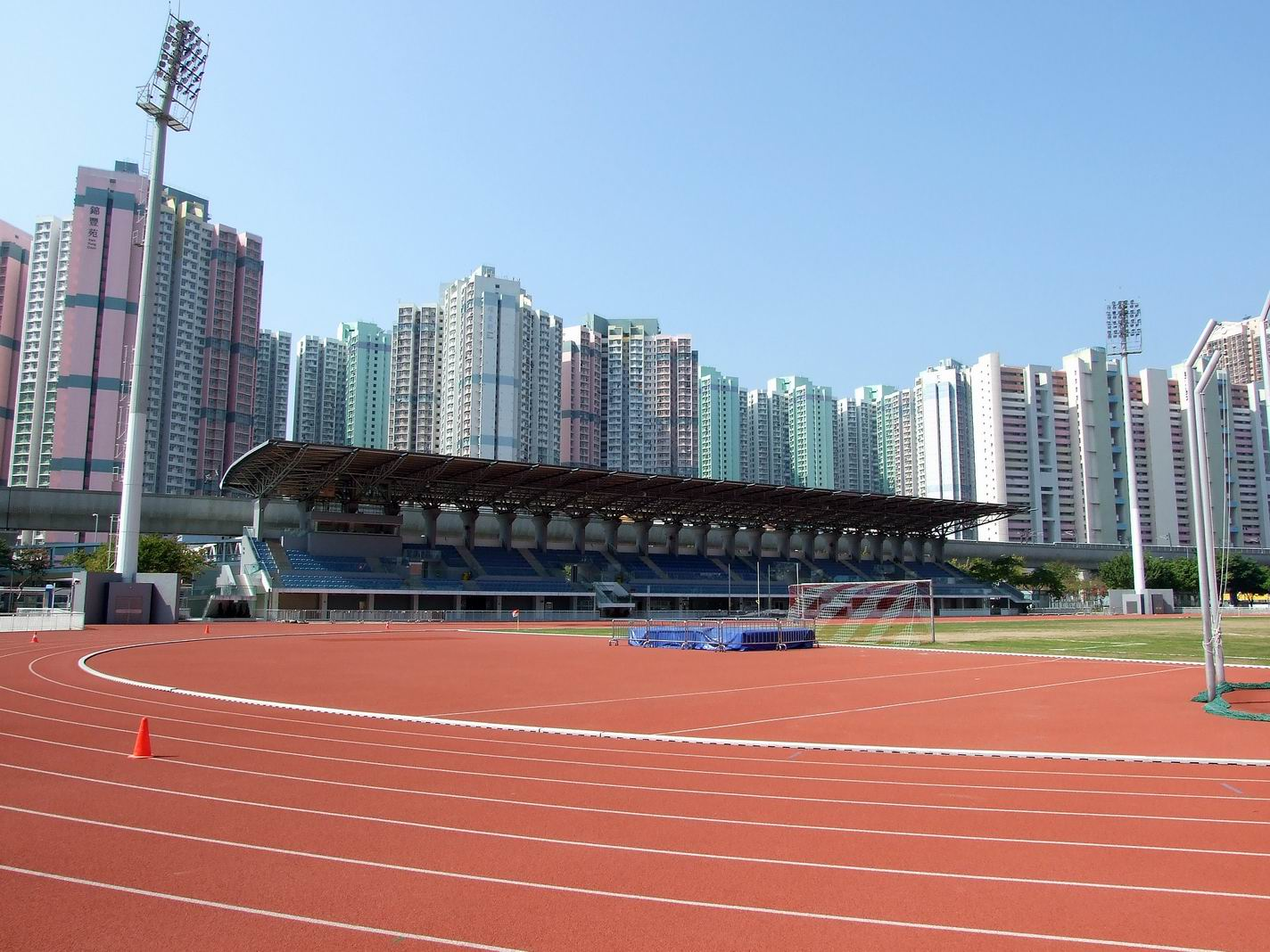
- Interactive map of Ma On Shan Sports Ground
- Location: 1 Hang Hong Street, Ma On Shan, Hong Kong
- Coordinates: 22.420824°N 114.228616°E
- Owner: Leisure and Cultural Services Department
- Operator: Leisure and Cultural Services Department
- Capacity: 1,387
- Surface: Grass
- Field size: 98 x 63.5 meters (107 x 69.5 yards)

Construction
- Built: 1996; 30 years ago
- Opened: 28 December 1999; 26 years ago
- Cost: HK$153 million

Tenant
- 2003 FESPIC Youth Games

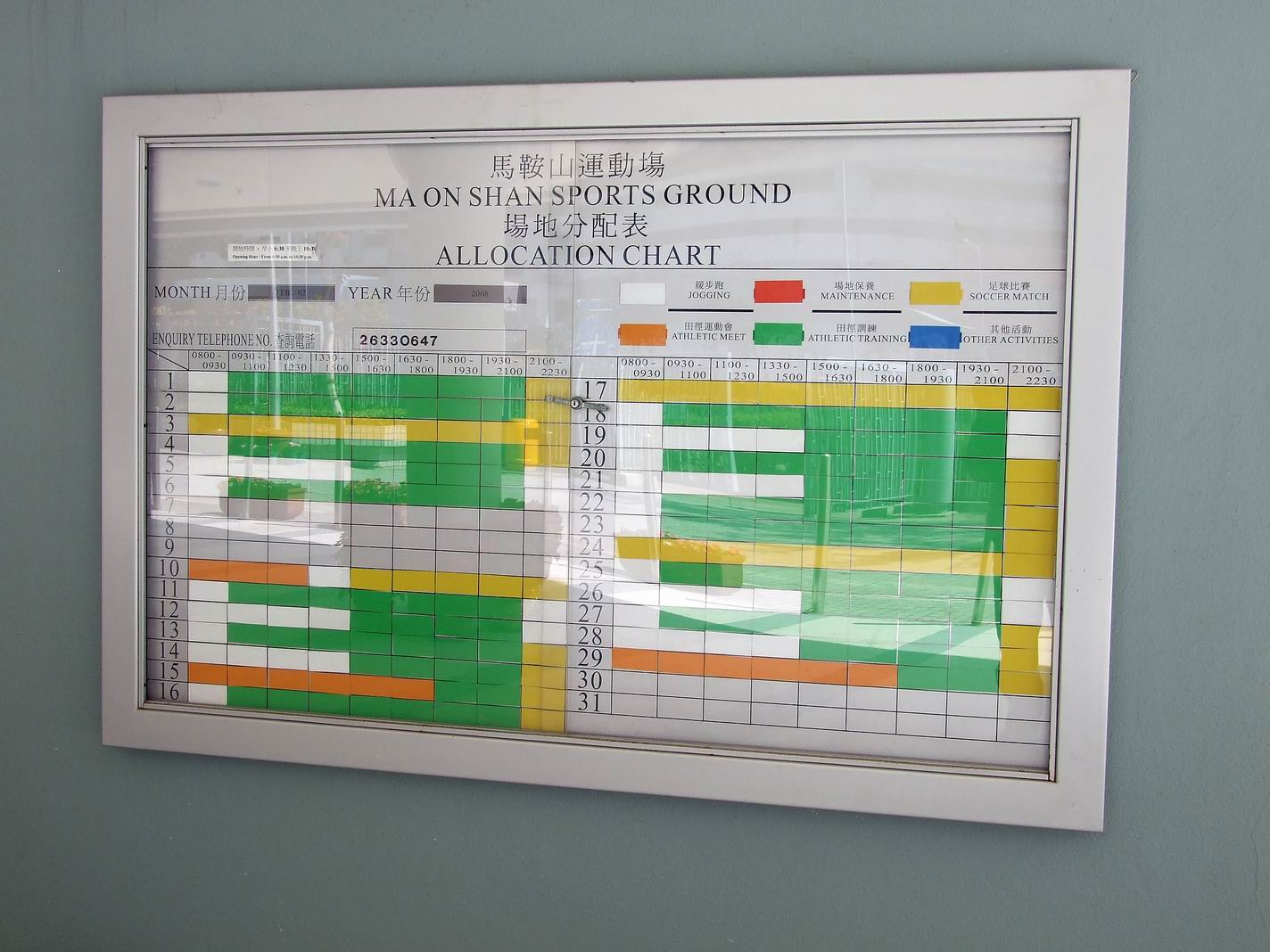
Feb 2008 schedule. 7, 8 and 9 are Chinese New Year holidays. The track is open to the public for jogging between 8:00 am to 9:00 pm

Ma On Shan Sports Ground (Chinese: 馬鞍山運動場) is a multi-use sports ground located in Ma On Shan, Sha Tin, Hong Kong. It was built at a cost of HK$153 million and opened in 1999. The sports ground is managed by the Leisure and Cultural Services Department.

== History ==
Ma On Shan was opened by Lau Wong-fat on 28 December 1999. During construction the completion date was seriously delayed due to contractor bankruptcy. Work was taken over by the Architectural Services Department in December 1997 who completed construction.

== Activities ==
Ma On Shan Sports Ground is designed for local sports use including schools and company sports days. When the venue is not booked, it is open to the public for jogging.

Due to the 2008 Olympics Equestrian event in Sha Tin, the Sports Institute's track and field athletes were given permission to train exclusively at Ma On Shan Sports Ground every day.

== Facilities ==
Ma On Shan Sports Ground's design is simple and practical. The double deck grandstand is 150m long and can accommodate 1,387 spectators.

Beneath the grandstand are changing rooms and offices. There is an 11-a-side natural grass football field and 400m running track.

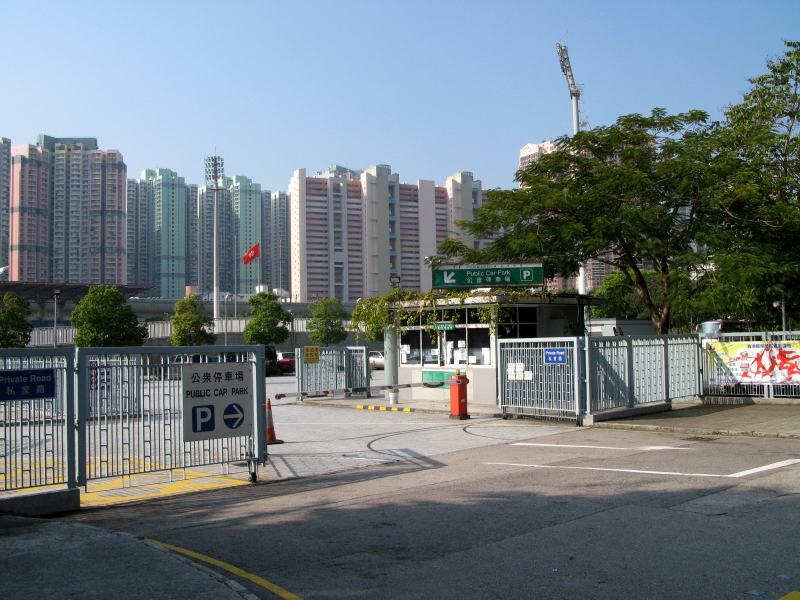
Car park entrance

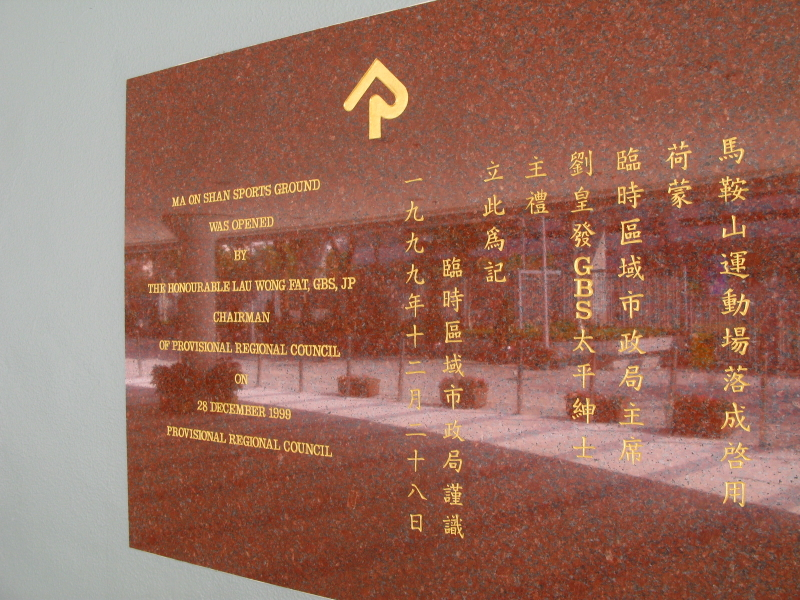
Foundation stone

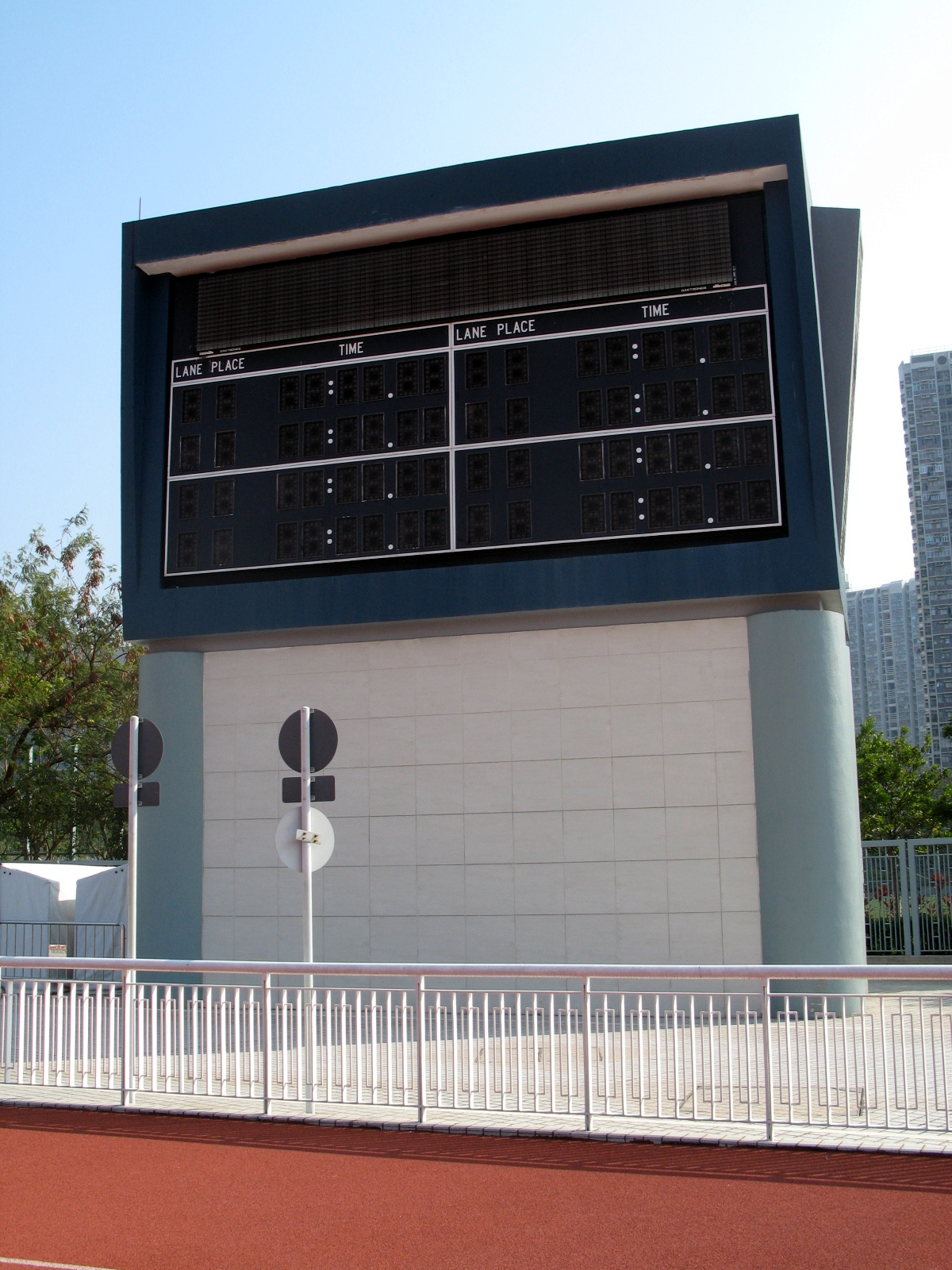
Electronic score board

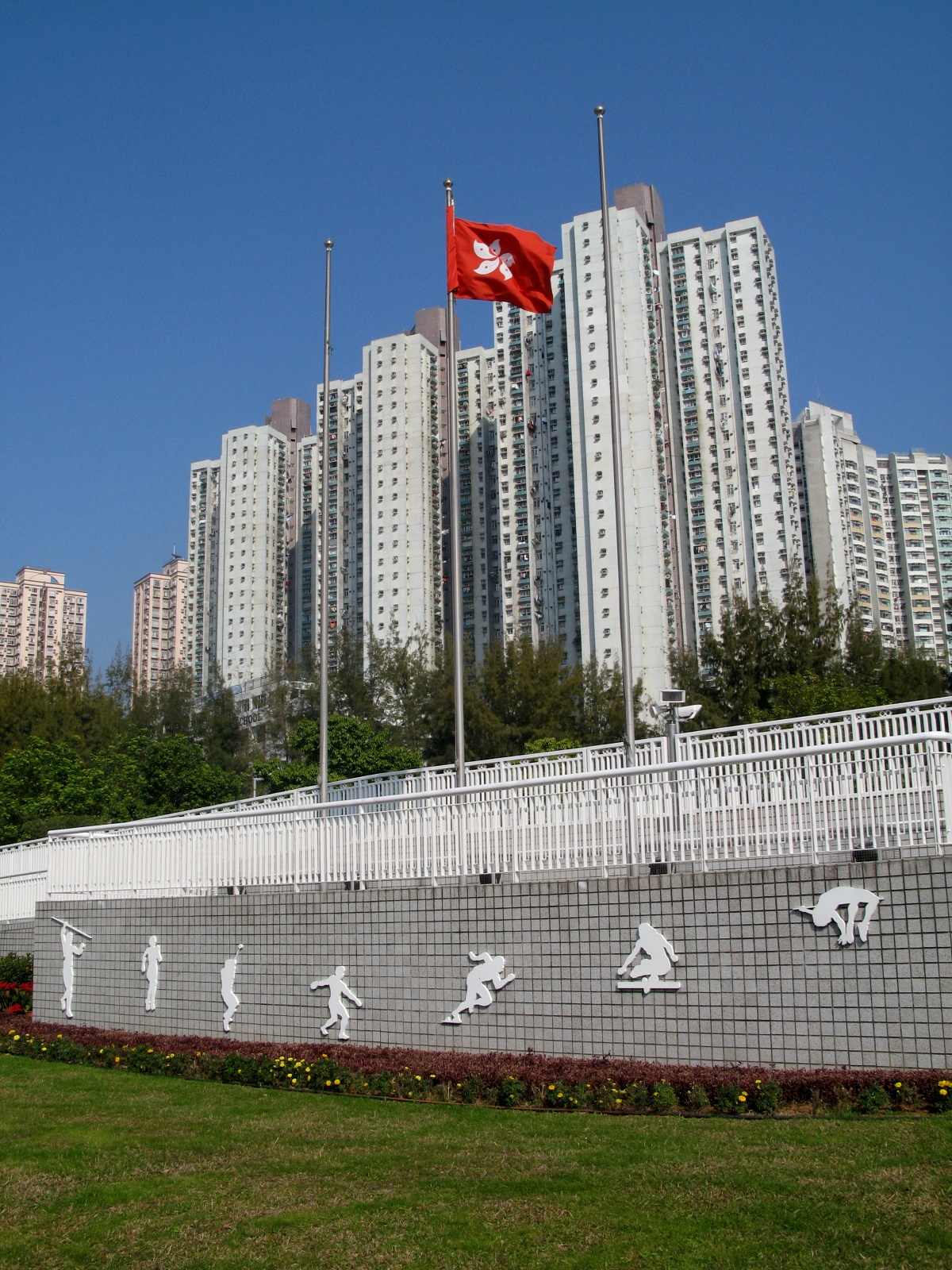
Podium

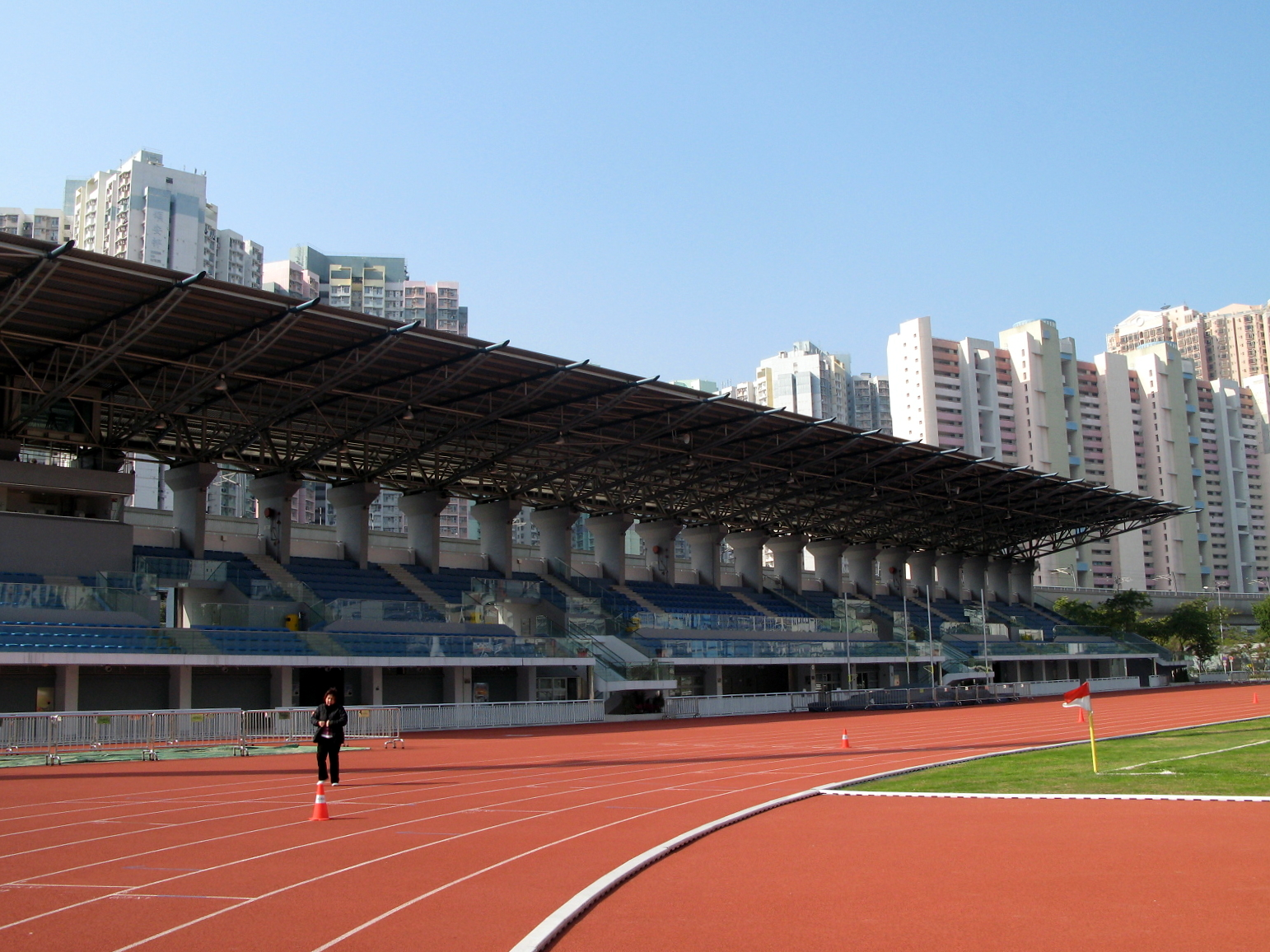
Grandstand

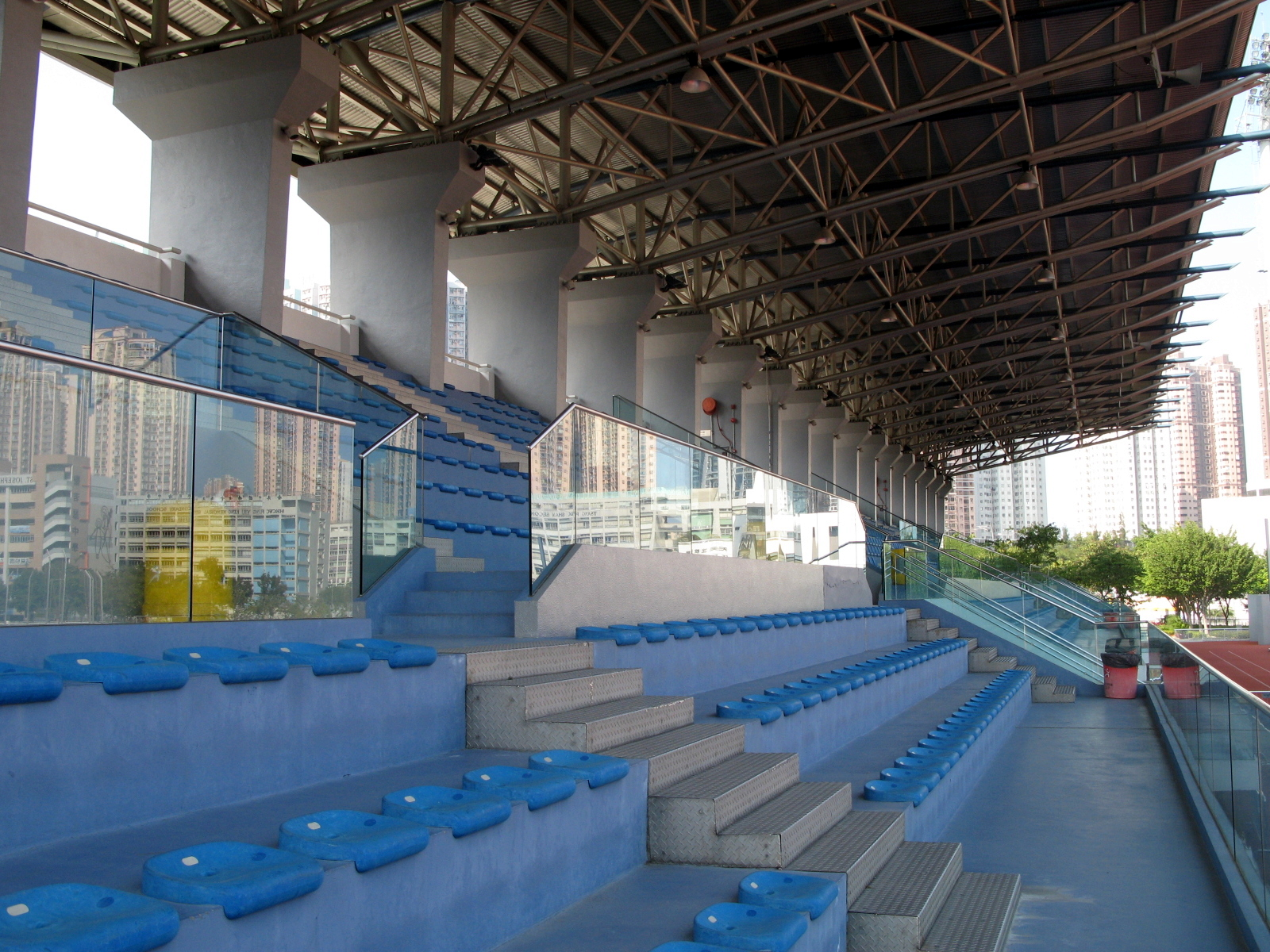
On the grandstand

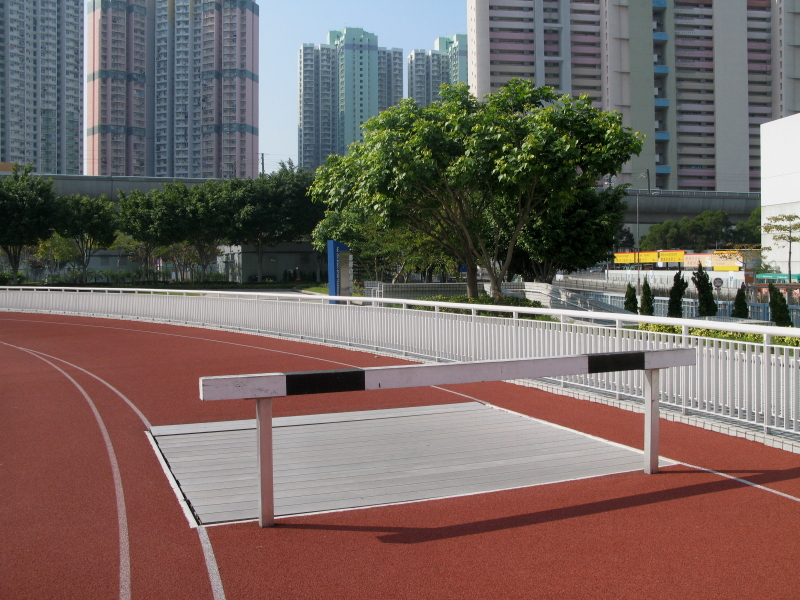
Running track

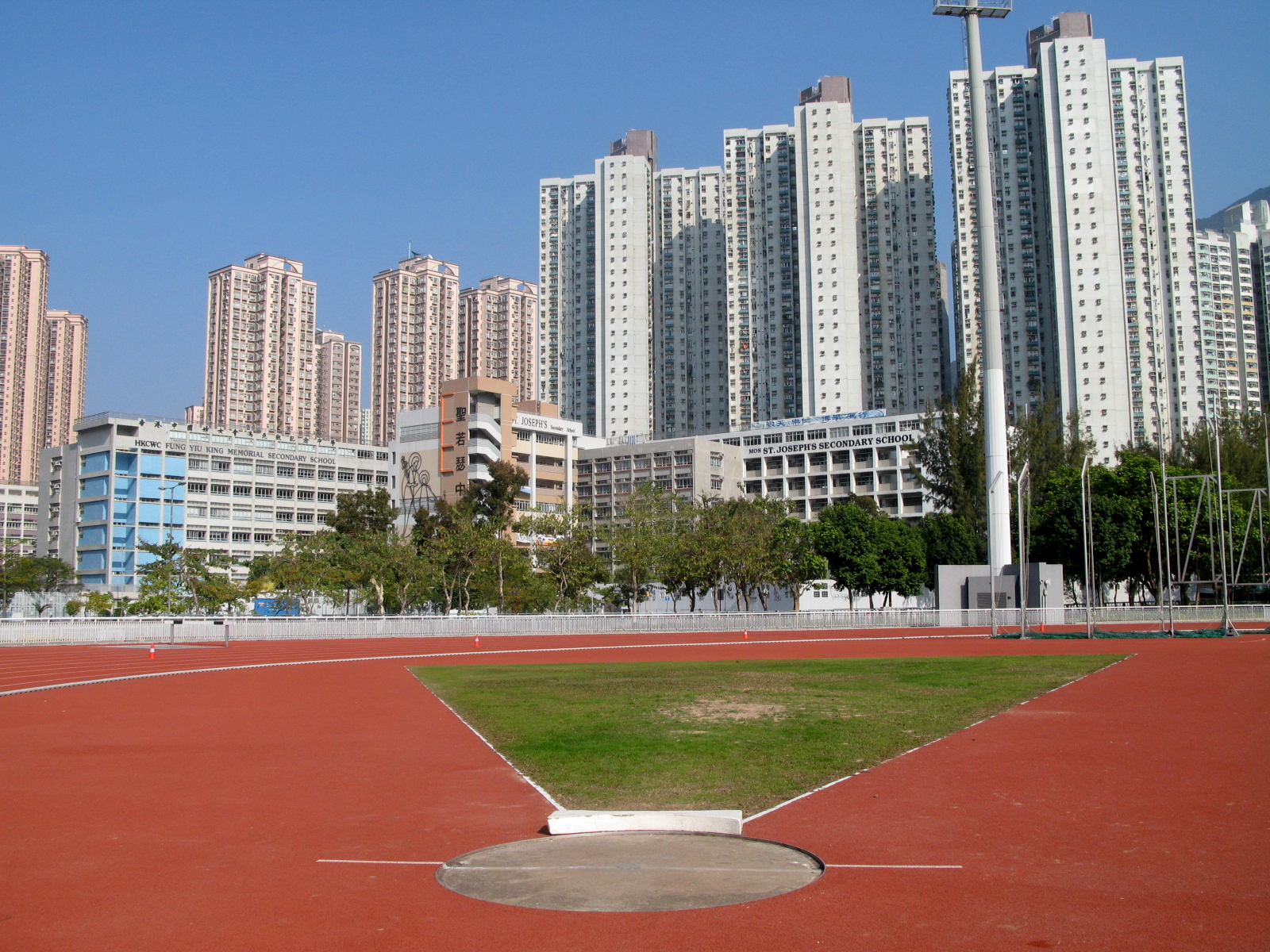
Track and field facilities

== See also ==
- Leisure and Cultural Services Department
