= Shin Miidera =

Japanese footballer

Shin Miidera 三井寺 眞
Personal information
- Date of birth: 2 April 2010 (age 16)
- Place of birth: Hirosaki, Aomori Prefecture, Japan
- Height: 1.74 m (5 ft 9 in)
- Position: Midfielder

Team information
- Current team: Yokohama F. Marinos
- Number: 47

Youth career
- Athletic Club Hirosaki
- FC Fori Classe Sendai
- Yokohama F. Marinos Youth

Senior career*
Years	Team	Apps	(Gls)
2026–	Yokohama F. Marinos	7	(2)

International career
2025	Japan U15		
2025–	Japan U16		
2026–	Japan U17		
- * Club domestic league appearances and goals as of 21:18, 14 September 2026 (UTC)

Shin Miidera (三井寺 眞, Miidera Shin; born 2 April 2010) is a Japanese professional footballer who plays as a midfielder for J1 League club Yokohama F. Marinos.

== Youth career ==
Miidera was born in Hirosaki, Aomori Prefecture, and began playing football in the second grade of elementary school. He attended Hirosaki Municipal Kita Elementary School and Sendai Municipal Tago Junior High School before enrolling at Daiichi Gakuin High School. He learned a great deal from former professional Nobuyuki Zaizen, who coached him while at FC Fori Classe Sendai.

== Club career ==
=== Yokohama F. Marinos ===
On his 16th birthday, 2 April 2026, Miidera signed a professional contract with J1 League club Yokohama F. Marinos, becoming the youngest player in the club's history. Marinos' team personnel manager and scout Shogo Kobara said that he wanted to sign Miidera as soon as possible due to his high potential, having seen him represent Japan at youth levels and describing him as one of the top players of his generation.

For the 2026–27 season, Miidera is enrolled as a Type 2 player, meaning he can continue to represent youth teams as well as the professional first team.

Miidera made his debut in Marinos' opening league match of the season on 7 August 2026, becoming the youngest player to appear in a J.League season-opener. He scored his first professional goal after seven minutes and was involved in all three of Marinos' goals in a 4–3 defeat. Japan national team manager Hajime Moriyasu praised his performance afterwards. In his third game of the season, against J1 100 Year Vision League champions Vissel Kobe, Miidera scored his second goal for the club helping secure a 1–0 victory.

== International career ==
Miidera has represented Japan at U15, U16 and U17 levels.

== Style of play ==
Miidera is a left-footed midfielder who can play in multiple attacking positions. As a fellow left-footed player, Miidera has cited Phil Foden as a player that he tries to imitate in play style.

== Career statistics ==
=== Club ===
As of 13 September 2026.

Appearances and goals by club, season and competition
Club	Season	League			National cup (Note: Includes Emperors Cup)		Total	
Club	Season	Division	Apps	Goals	Apps	Goals	Apps	Goals
Yokohama F. Marinos	2026–27	J1 League	7	2	1	0	8	2
Career total			7	2	1	0	8	2
