= Tem Hansen =

Danish/Faroese footballer (born 1984)

Personal information
- Full name: Tem Willemoes Thordan Hansen
- Date of birth: 18 January 1984 (age 42)
- Place of birth: Denmark
- Height: 1.80 m (5 ft 11 in)
- Position: Midfielder

Team information
- Current team: not active
- Number: 8

Youth career
- Køge BK
- B.93

Senior career*
Years	Team	Apps	(Gls)
2002–2003	B.93	6	(0)
2004	Brøndby II		
2005–2007	Fremad Amager	71	(4)
2007–2008	Lyngby BK	4	(0)
2008–present	BK Søllerød-Vedbæk		

International career^{‡}
2007–	Faroe Islands	2	(0)
- * Club domestic league appearances and goals as of 14 September 2009 ‡ National team caps and goals as of 21 July 2008

Tem Willesmoes Thordan Hansen (born 18 January 1984) is a Danish-Faroese former professional football midfielder.

Hansen began his professional career with 1. Division side B.93, making his debut in 2002 aged 17. He then went on to play for Brondby IF, Fremad Amager (1. Division) and Lyngby Boldklub (Superliga) before ending the career with BK Søllerød-Vedbæk. Hansen also played for Denmark's U18 and U19 teams before accepting an offer to represent the Faroe Islands in the UEFA qualifiers, making his debut in March 2007 against Ukraine.
