= Cai McGunnigle =

Scottish footballer (born 2007)

Personal information
- Full name: Cai Gabriel McGunnigle
- Date of birth: 30 March 2009 (age 17)
- Place of birth: Hong Kong
- Height: 1.82 m (6 ft 0 in)
- Position: Forward

Team information
- Current team: HKFC
- Number: 67

Youth career
- –2020: Kowloon Cricket Club
- 2021–2022: Southern
- 2022–2025: HKFC

Senior career*
Years	Team	Apps	(Gls)
2025–	HKFC	24	(4)

International career^{‡}
2025–	Scotland U17	4	(0)
- * Club domestic league appearances and goals as of 8 November 2026 ‡ National team caps and goals as of 31 October 2025

Cai Gabriel McGunnigle (born 30 March 2009) is a professional footballer who currently plays as a forward for Hong Kong Premier League club HKFC. Born in Hong Kong, he is a Scotland youth international.

== Early life ==
McGunnigle was born on 30 March 2009. Growing up, he played tennis.

== Club career ==
As a youth player, McGunnigle joined the youth academy of Kowloon Cricket Club. Following his stint there, he joined the youth academy of Southern in 2021. One year later, he joined the youth academy of HKFC and was promoted to the club's senior team in 2025.

== International career ==
McGunnigle is a Scotland youth international. During the autumn of 2025, he played for the Scotland national under-17 football team for 2026 UEFA European Under-17 Championship qualification.

Despite having represented Scotland at youth level, McGunnigle is still keeping the door open to representing Hong Kong as he remains eligible.
