= Bohdan Budko =

Ukrainian footballer (born 2006)

Personal information
- Full name: Bohdan Mykhailovych Budko
- Date of birth: 7 January 2006 (age 20)
- Place of birth: Kharkiv, Ukraine
- Height: 1.84 m (6 ft 0 in)
- Position: Midfielder

Team information
- Current team: Jong AZ
- Number: 14

Youth career
- Metalist
- –2022: Shakhtar
- 2023–2025: AZ

Senior career*
Years	Team	Apps	(Gls)
2024–	Jong AZ	22	(1)

International career^{‡}
2023	Ukraine U17	3	(0)
2023	Ukraine U18	3	(0)
2024	Ukraine U19	2	(0)
2025	Ukraine U20	6	(0)
- * Club domestic league appearances and goals as of 28 April 2026 ‡ National team caps and goals as of 31 May 2026

Bohdan Mykhailovych Budko (Ukrainian: Богдан Будко; born 7 January 2006) is a Ukrainian professional footballer who plays as a midfielder for Eerste Divisie club Jong AZ.

== Early life ==
Budko was born on 7 January 2006 in Kharkiv. The son of Mikhael and Anzhela, he has a sister. Growing up in Kharkiv, Ukraine, he started playing football at the age of five.

== Club career ==
As a youth player, Budko joined the youth academy of Ukrainian side Metalist. Following his stint there, he joined the youth academy of Ukrainian side Shakhtar.

Subsequently, he joined the youth academy of Dutch side AZ in 2023 and was promoted to the club's reserve team ahead of the 2025–26 season.

== International career ==
Budko is a Ukraine youth international. During the autumn of 2025, he played for the Ukraine national under-20 football team at the 2025 FIFA U-20 World Cup.
