= Kenji Treschuk =

American soccer player (born 1982)

Personal information
- Full name: Kenji Treschuk
- Date of birth: December 26, 1982 (age 43)
- Place of birth: Honolulu, Hawaii, United States
- Height: 5 ft 10 in (1.78 m)
- Positions: Defender; midfielder

Youth career
- 2001–2004: Penn State Nittany Lions

Senior career*
Years	Team	Apps	(Gls)
2005	HCSC		
2006–2007	AFC34		
2007–2008	Seattle Sounders	53	(3)
2009	Charleston Battery	27	(1)
- * Club domestic league appearances and goals as of 22 October 2009

Kenji Treschuk (born December 26, 1982, in Honolulu, Hawaii) is an American soccer player, currently for Wan Chai Sports Federation.

== Career ==
=== College and amateur ===
Treschuk attended Moanalua High School, who he led in scoring his junior and senior seasons, and played club soccer for the amateur Honolulu Bulls of the Men's Island Soccer Organization. He was offered scholarships at several small colleges, but opted to take a year off after high school. During that time, he played for several mainland traveling teams. When Penn State soccer coach Barry Gorman held a camp in Honolulu, Treschuk caught his eye. That brought an offer to play for Penn State, and was offered a scholarship after his freshman season. While there he was a three time Big Ten All Academic Team.

After graduating from Penn State, Treschuk spent several months playing for amateur HCSC in the town of Den Helder, Netherlands in 2005. He had trials with several professional teams in the Netherlands, but was not offered a contract. He spent time with another amateur Dutch team, AFC34, in 2006 before returning to the United States in 2007.

=== Professional ===
After moving back to the United States in 2007 Treschuk signed with the Seattle Sounders of USL First Division. Following a rookie season that saw him score 15 times in 26 regular season games, became the Sounders' enforcer on the way to a United Soccer Leagues First Division title and Rookie of the Year honors in 2007 USL-1 Award Finalists announced.

Treschuk was invited to the Seattle Sounders FC training camp, but was not offered a contract with the expansion Major League Soccer team; instead, he moved to Charleston Battery in February 2009.

== Career statistics ==
(correct as of 10 July 2010)

Club	Season	League			Cup			Play-Offs			Total		
Club	Season	Apps	Goals	Assists	Apps	Goals	Assists	Apps	Goals	Assists	Apps	Goals	Assists
Seattle Sounders FC	2007	26	0	2	?	?	?	3	?	?	29	?	2
Seattle Sounders FC	2008	27	3	?	?	?	?	1	?	?	28	3	?
Charleston Battery	2009	26	1	0	?	?	?	1	?	?	27	1	0
Career Total	2007–present	79	4	2	?	?	?	5	?	?	84	4	2

== Honors ==
- 2007 USL First Division Rookie of the Year

=== Seattle Sounders ===
- USL First Division Championship (1): 2007
- USL First Division Commissioner's Cup (1): 2007
