= Peter Smith (English footballer, born 1985) =

English footballer

Personal information
- Full name: Peter James Smith
- Date of birth: 26 November 1985 (age 40)
- Place of birth: England
- Position: Goalkeeper

Senior career*
Years	Team	Apps	(Gls)
2020–2022	HKFC	9	(0)
- * Club domestic league appearances and goals as of 2 September 2022

Peter James Smith (born 26 November 1985) is an English former professional footballer who played as a goalkeeper.

== Career statistics ==
=== Club ===
As of 26 October 2021

Appearances and goals by club, season and competition
Club	Season	League			Cup		League Cup		Total	
Club	Season	Division	Apps	Goals	Apps	Goals	Apps	Goals	Apps	Goals
HKFC	2020–21	First Division	7	0	0	0	0	0	7	0
HKFC	2021–22	Premier League	1	0	0	0	3 (Note: Appearances in the Sapling Cup)	0	4	0
HKFC	Total		8	0	0	0	3	0	11	0
