= Robert Scott (footballer, born 1990) =

Scottish footballer (born 1990)

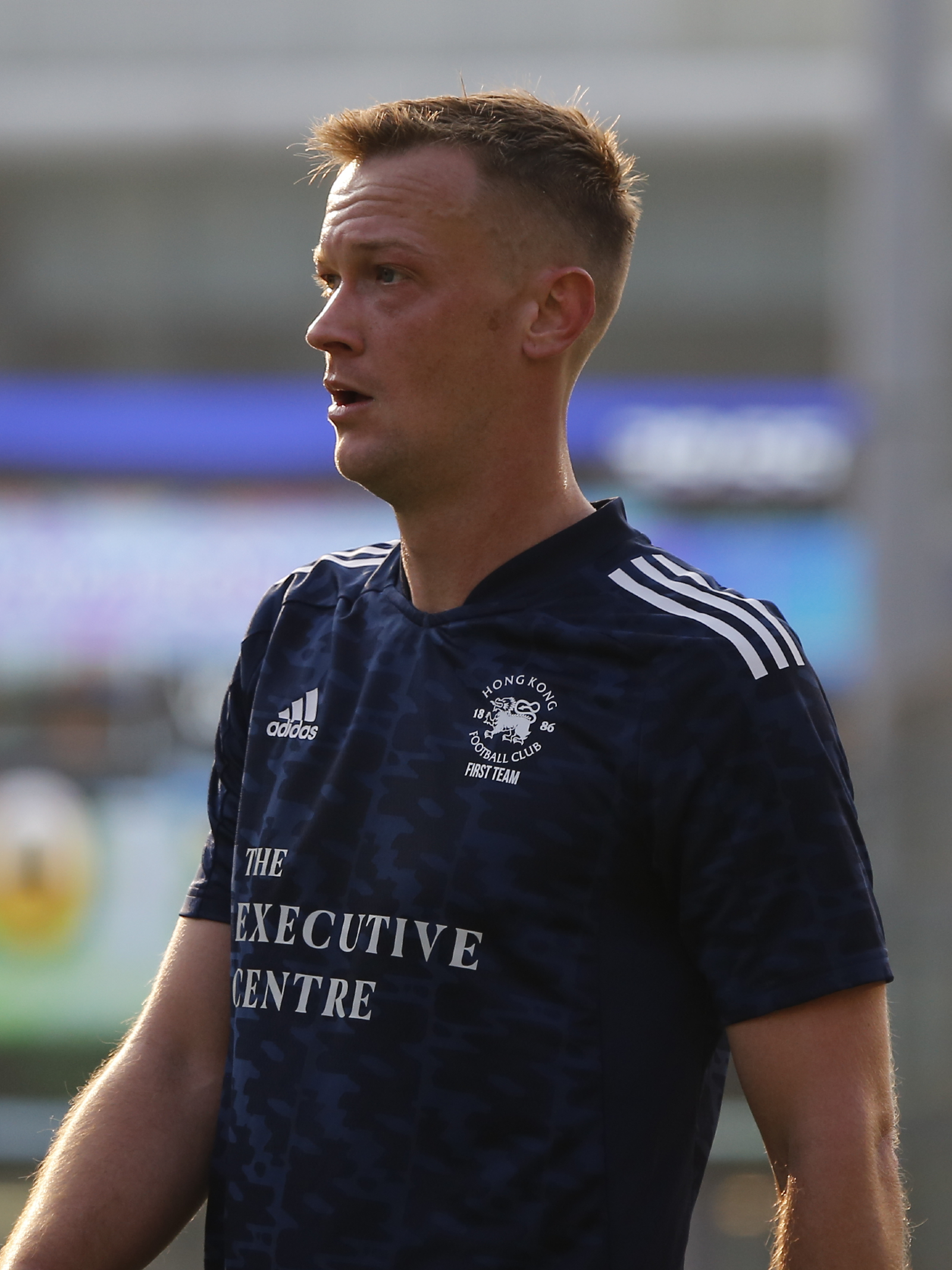

Personal information
- Full name: Robert Anthony Scott
- Date of birth: 7 December 1990 (age 35)
- Place of birth: Scotland
- Height: 1.86 m (6 ft 1 in)
- Position: Left winger

Youth career
- HKFC

Senior career*
Years	Team	Apps	(Gls)
2012–2023	HKFC	173	(59)
- * Club domestic league appearances and goals as of 5 August 2023

Robert Anthony Scott (born 7 December 1990) is a Scottish former professional footballer who played as a left winger.
