= Hugo Moreira (footballer, born 1990) =

Portuguese footballer

Personal information
- Full name: Hugo Filipe Silva Moreira
- Date of birth: 30 October 1990 (age 36)
- Place of birth: Maia, Portugal
- Height: 1.70 m (5 ft 7 in)
- Position: Defender

Youth career
- 1999–2009: Salgueiros

Senior career*
Years	Team	Apps	(Gls)
2009–2016	Salgueiros	96	(0)
2016–2017	Zimbru Chișinău	46	(0)
2018–2019	Cinfães	34	(0)
2019–2021	Salgueiros	41	(0)
2021	Gandra	15	(0)
2022–2023	Oliveira Douro	51	(2)
2023–2024	Pedras Rubras	19	(2)
2025–2026	HKFC	16	(0)
- * Club domestic league appearances and goals as of 16 May 2026

Hugo Moreira (born 30 October 1990) is a former Portuguese professional footballer who played as a defender. Besides playing in Portugal, he has also played in Moldova and Hong Kong.

== Career ==
On 1 August 2025, Moreira joined Hong Kong Premier League club HKFC.
