= Robert Bacon (footballer) =

English footballer

Personal information
- Full name: Robert Alexander Bacon
- Date of birth: 5 February 1989 (age 37)
- Place of birth: England
- Position: Forward

Senior career*
Years	Team	Apps	(Gls)
2009–2020	HKFC	182	(102)
2021–2022	HKFC	0	(0)
- * Club domestic league appearances and goals

Robert Alexander Bacon (born 8 February 1989) is an English former professional footballer who played as a forward. He was the Club's Soccer Chairman from 2018 to 2022. He previously played cricket for the Hong Kong National Team.

== Career statistics ==
=== Club ===
Appearances and goals by club, season and competition
Club	Season	League			Cup		League Cup		Other		Total	
Club	Season	Division	Apps	Goals	Apps	Goals	Apps	Goals	Apps	Goals	Apps	Goals
HKFC	2012–13	First Division	27	25	0	0	0	0	0	0	27	25
HKFC	2013–14	First Division	26	23	0	0	0	0	0	0	26	23
HKFC	2014–15	First Division	24	20	0	0	0	0	0	0	24	20
HKFC	2015–16	First Division	18	3	0	0	0	0	0	0	18	3
HKFC	2016–17	Premier League	16	2	1 (Note: Appearances in the Hong Kong FA Cup)	0	0	0	1 (Note: Appearances in the Hong Kong Senior Shield)	1	18	3
HKFC	2017–18	First Division	14	4	0	0	0	0	0	0	14	4
HKFC	2018–19	First Division	10	7	0	0	0	0	0	0	10	7
HKFC	2019–20	First Division	9	3	0	0	0	0	0	0	9	3
HKFC	2021–22	Premier League	0	0	0	0	0	0	0	0	0	0
HKFC	Total		67	19	1	0	0	0	1	1	69	20
Career total			172	101	1	0	2	5	1	1	182	107
