= Brighton & Hove Albion F.C. in European football =

English club in European football

- Club: Brighton & Hove Albion F.C.
- Seasons played: 2
- Most appearances: Pascal Groß (8)
- Top scorer: João Pedro (6)
- First entry: 2023–24 UEFA Europa League
- Latest entry: 2026–27 UEFA Conference League

Titles
- Champions League: 0
- Europa League: 0
- Super Cup: 0

Brighton & Hove Albion Football Club (/ˈbraɪtən ... ˈhoʊv/ BRY-tən … HOHV), commonly referred to simply as Brighton, is an English professional football club based in the city of Brighton and Hove. They compete in the Premier League, the top tier of the English football league system. The club's home ground is the 31,876-capacity Falmer Stadium in Falmer, in the north east of Brighton.

Brighton qualified for Europe for the first time in their 122-year history in 2023 after finishing sixth in the 2022–23 Premier League. In their first UEFA Europa League campaign, Brighton topped their group and advanced to the knockout phase, but were eliminated by Roma in the round of 16.

== Matches ==
Season	Competition	Round	Opponent	Home	Away	Aggregate
2023–24	UEFA Europa League	Group B	(Greece) AEK Athens	2–3	1–0	1st
2023–24	UEFA Europa League	Group B	(France) Marseille	1–0	2–2	1st
2023–24	UEFA Europa League	Group B	(Netherlands) Ajax	2–0	2–0	1st
2023–24	UEFA Europa League	R16	(Italy) Roma	1–0	0–4	1–4
2026–27	UEFA Conference League	PO	(Norway) Tromsø	4–0	0–0	4–0
2026–27	UEFA Conference League	LP	(Lithuania) Kauno Žalgiris	4–0	—N/a	
2026–27	UEFA Conference League	LP	(Czech Republic) Jablonec	—N/a	0–0	
2026–27	UEFA Conference League	LP	(Spain) Getafe	—N/a	1–0	
2026–27	UEFA Conference League	LP	(Romania) Universitatea Craiova		—N/a	
2026–27	UEFA Conference League	LP	(France) Monaco		—N/a	
2026–27	UEFA Conference League	LP	(Greece) Panathinaikos	—N/a		

Source: UEFA.com, Last updated on 20 August 2026

Notes

- 2QR: Second qualifying round
- 3QR: Third qualifying round
- PO : Play-off round
- KRPO : Knockout round play-offs
- R32: Round of 32
- R16: Round of 16
- QF : Quarter-finals
- SF : Semi-finals

== Overall record ==
=== By competition ===
As of 5 November 2026

Competition	Pld	W	D	L	GF	GA	GD	Win%
UEFA Europa League	8	5	1	2	11	9	+2	62.50
UEFA Conference League	5	3	2	0	9	0	+9	60.00
Total	13	8	3	2	20	9	+11	61.54

=== By club ===
As of 5 November 2026

Club	Pld	W	D	L	GF	GA	GD	W %
(Netherlands) Ajax	2	2	0	0	4	0	+4	100.00
(Greece) AEK Athens	2	1	0	1	3	3	+0	50.00
(Spain) Getafe	1	1	0	0	1	0	+1	100.00
(Czech Republic) Jablonec	1	0	1	0	0	0	+0	0.00
(Lithuania) Kauno Žalgiris	1	1	0	0	4	0	+4	100.00
(France) Marseille	2	1	1	0	3	2	+1	50.00
(France) AS Monaco	0	0	0	0	0	0	+0	—
(Greece) Panathinaikos	0	0	0	0	0	0	+0	—
(Italy) Roma	2	1	0	1	1	4	−3	50.00
(Norway) Tromsø	2	1	1	0	4	0	+4	50.00
(Romania) Universitatea Craiova	0	0	0	0	0	0	+0	—

=== By country ===
As of 5 November 2026

Country	Pld	W	D	L	GF	GA	GD	W %
France	2	1	1	0	3	2	+1	50.00
Greece	2	1	0	1	3	3	+0	50.00
Italy	2	1	0	1	1	4	−3	50.00
Lithuania	1	1	0	0	4	0	+4	100.00
Netherlands	2	2	0	0	4	0	+4	100.00
Norway	2	1	1	0	4	0	+4	50.00
Spain	1	1	0	0	1	0	+1	100.00
