= Matías Orozco =

Colombian footballer (born 2007)

Personal information
- Full name: Matías Yuseth Orozco López
- Date of birth: 1 December 2007 (age 18)
- Place of birth: Barranquilla, Colombia
- Height: 1.74 m (5 ft 9 in)
- Position: Defensive midfielder

Team information
- Current team: Castellón (on loan from Brighton & Hove Albion)
- Number: 6

Youth career
- 2022–2025: Deportivo Cali

Senior career*
Years	Team	Apps	(Gls)
2025–2026	Deportivo Cali	25	(1)
2026–	Brighton & Hove Albion	0	(0)
2026–	→ Castellón (loan)	7	(1)

International career^{‡}
2026	Colombia U19	4	(0)
2026	Colombia U20	2	(0)
2026–	Colombia	4	(0)
- * Club domestic league appearances and goals as of 1 November 2026 ‡ National team caps and goals as of 18 November 2026

Matías Yuseth Orozco López (born 1 December 2007) is a Colombian professional footballer who plays as a defensive midfielder for Segunda División club Castellón, on loan from Premier League club Brighton & Hove Albion, and the Colombia national team.

== Club career ==
Born in Barranquilla, Orozco played youth football for the Barranquilla School's youth academy where he was spotted at the age of 11 years-old by talent scout Agustín Garizábalo, who previously scouted Colombian players such as Juan Guillermo Cuadrado, Luis Muriel, Abel Aguilar, and Rafael Santos Borré. "If professional football were to end someday, Matías Orozco would perhaps be one of the few footballers who would continue playing football, purely for pleasure, because I can't imagine him doing anything else" Garizábalo said in 2025.

A midfielder, Orozco started playing as an attacking number ten before moving deeper. He joined the youth system at Categoría Primera A club Deportivo Cali in 2022. Orozco was promoted to train with the Deportivo Cali first team at the age of 16 years-old. He made his professional debut for the club in 2025 in the Copa Colombia under head coach Alberto Gamero, and became a regular starter for the club the following year as an 18-year-old. He signed a new contract that year until 2029, with a release clause reported to be of $6 million.

On 30 August 2026, Orozco joined English Premier League club Brighton & Hove Albion for an undisclosed fee on a five-year contract. Two days later, he was loaned to Segunda División side Castellón for the season.

== International career ==
Orozco became the captain of the Colombia national under-20 football team in 2026. In September 2026, he was called-up up to the senior Colombia national football team for the first time.

== Career statistics ==
=== Club ===
As of match played 1 November 2026

Appearances and goals by club, season and competition
Club	Season	League			National Cup		Total	
Club	Season	Division	Apps	Goals	Apps	Goals	Apps	Goals
Deportivo Cali	2025	Primera A	11	0	0	0	11	0
Deportivo Cali	2026	Primera A	14	1	1 (Note: Appearances in Copa Colombia)	1	15	2
Deportivo Cali	Total		25	1	1	1	26	2
Brighton & Hove Albion	2026–27	Premier League	0	0	0	0	0	0
Castellón (loan)	2026–27	LaLiga 2	7	1	1 (Note: Appearances in Copa del Rey)	0	8	1
Career total			32	2	2	1	34	3

=== International ===
As of match played 18 November 2026

Appearances and goals by national team and year
National team	Year	Apps	Goals
Colombia	2026	4	0
Total		4	0
