= Daniel Niedzkowski =

German football coach (born 1976)

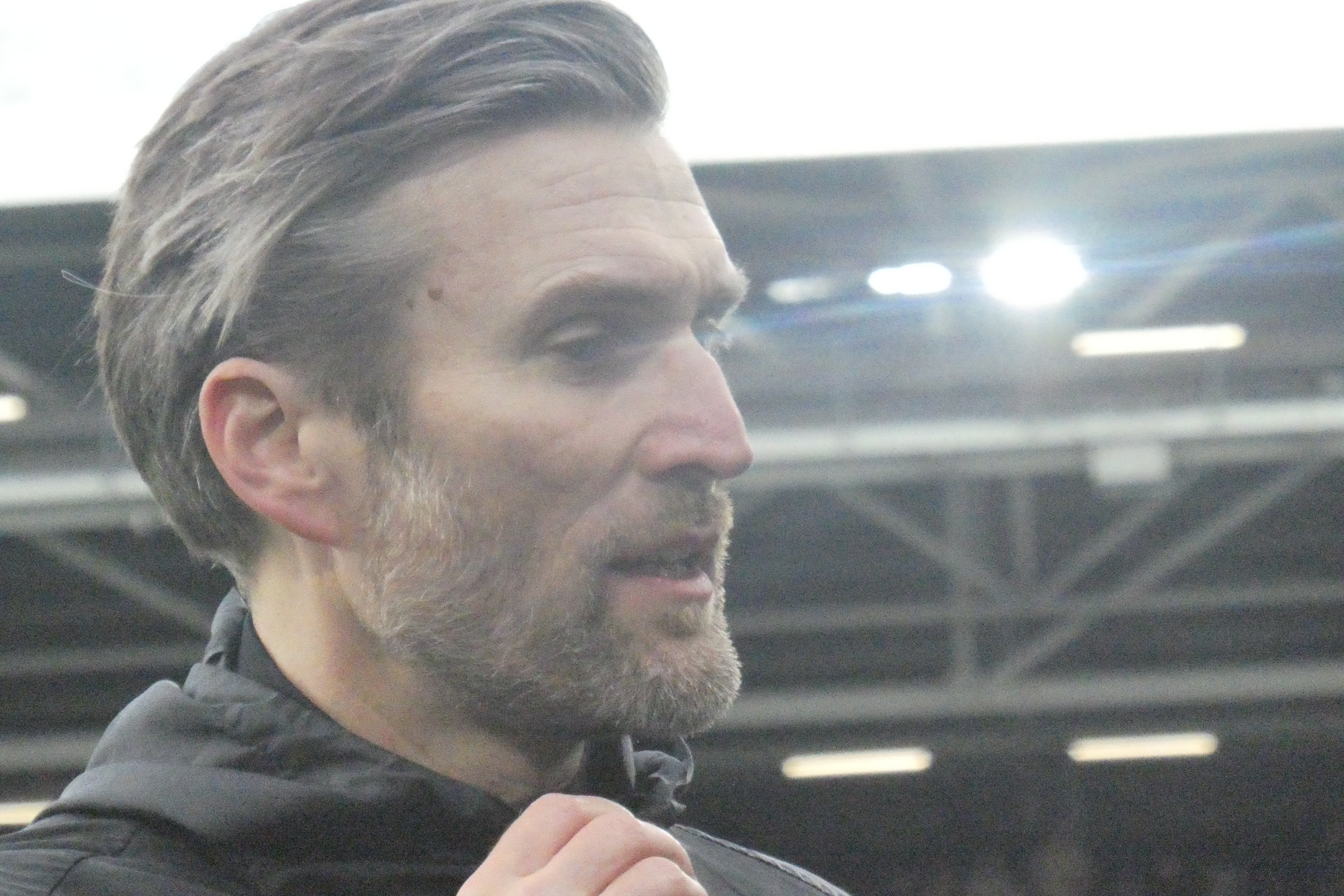
- Niedzkowski in 2026.

Personal information
- Date of birth: 14 December 1976 (age 49)
- Place of birth: Solingen, West Germany
- Position: Midfielder

Team information
- Current team: Brighton & Hove Albion (assistant head coach)

Youth career
- VfB am Bavert

Senior career*
Years	Team	Apps	(Gls)
- VfB Solingen
1998–1999	Wuppertaler SV		
1999	FC Remscheid		
- * Club domestic league appearances and goals

Daniel Niedzkowski (born 14 December 1976) is a German football coach and former player who is assistant head coach of Premier League club Brighton & Hove Albion.

== Playing career ==
Born in Solingen, Niedzkowski played as a midfielder for lower-league clubs including VfB am Bavert, VfB Solingen, Wuppertaler SV and FC Remscheid.

== Coaching career ==
Niedzkowski worked as a coach with the German Football Association (DFB) from 2008, joining Bayer Leverkusen in 2013, before returning to the DFB in 2016.

In November 2024, Niedzkowski was appointed as assistant head coach of English club Brighton & Hove Albion, with effect from January 2025.
