= John Jackson (football manager) =

English football manager (1861–1931)

Personal information
- Date of birth: 1861
- Place of birth: Midlands, England
- Date of death: 1931 (aged 69–70)
- Place of death: Brighton, England

Managerial career
- Years: Team
- 1898–1900: Brighton United
- 1901–1905: Brighton & Hove Albion

John Jackson (1861–1931) was the first manager and a founder of Brighton & Hove Albion F.C.

== Early life ==
Jackson was born in 1861, living in the Midlands, where he had a playing career with several local clubs.

== Managerial career ==
Jackson managed Brighton's first professional football club, Brighton United. The club folded in 1900, and a replacement, Brighton & Hove Rangers was formed. Rangers were elected to the Southern League in 1901, but disbanded. Jackson called a meeting in the Seven Stars Hotel in Brighton to form another replacement club. This club was originally to be called Brighton & Hove United, but was changed to Brighton & Hove Albion before a ball was kicked. The new club took the now vacant league place formerly occupied by Rangers.

Jackson had a row with club captain Frank McAvoy in December 1901 which failed to calm down. In February 1902, McAvoy assaulted him and knocked him to the ground, leading to the player being sacked from the club. The feud continued with McAvoy, and another former player, Clem Barker, looking for him at the Farm Tavern (which Jackson ran) in August. He was visiting Lewes and the pair told his wife; "We are going to the station to meet your husband, and you must consider yourself lucky if he is brought home alive!". The pair were accused of threatening behaviour at Hove Court and bound to keep the peace for 6 months for £10.

In 1905, the Jackson Souvenir Cup was played as a testimonial between Brighton and Tottenham Hotspur which resulted in a 3–3 draw. After the game it was announced the cup would be contested annually by schoolboy teams from the two clubs.

An FA inquiry into illegal payments eventually led to him being censured. As a result, he was replaced in 1905 by Frank Scott-Walford.

== Later life ==
After leaving football management, Jackson stayed in Brighton and ran public houses, including the Camden Arms and the Running Horse. He died aged 70.
