= Frank Scott-Walford =

English footballer (1866–1935)

Personal information
- Date of birth: c. 1866
- Place of birth: Birmingham, England
- Date of death: 27 June 1935 (aged 68–69)
- Place of death: Croydon, England
- Position: Goalkeeper

Senior career*
Years	Team	Apps	(Gls)
- Tottenham Hotspur
- London Caledonians
- Lincoln City
- Small Heath
- Aston Villa

Managerial career
- 1905–1908: Brighton & Hove Albion
- 1908–1912: Leeds City
- 1914–1915: Coventry City
- * Club domestic league appearances and goals

Frank Scott-Walford (c. 1866 – 27 June 1935) was an English football player and manager, best known for managing Brighton & Hove Albion, Leeds City and Coventry City.

== Early life ==
Scott-Walford was born circa 1866, in Perry Barr, Birmingham. Little is known about his early life, other than that he trained as an engineer and was listed in the 1901 census as a fitter.

== Playing career ==
Scott-Walford is first known to have played for Tottenham Hotspur, joining the club as an amateur in the late 1880s. He played as a goalkeeper and later signed to the club as a professional, the first player to do so. He later played as a professional for a number of clubs, known to have included London Caledonians, Lincoln City, Small Heath and Aston Villa.

After he left Villa he was reinstated as an amateur by his own request. He was also an experienced referee.

== Managerial career ==
=== Brighton & Hove Albion ===
Scott-Walford signed a 5-year contract to manage Brighton & Hove Albion in 1905, after the dismissal of John Jackson. Within two months of his arrival he had just three players left and had to rebuild the team from scratch. Unsurprisingly, the Albion finished in the bottom four of their division in his first season in charge. His desperate search led to FA charges. On 2 April 1906 he was suspended from football management for 4 months.

Team photograph for the 1905/06 cup season. Scott-Walford is in the back row to the left of the goalkeeper.

Results improved and the Albion finished third the following season.

=== Leeds City ===
In 1908, he was one of 90 applicants for the vacant managerial post at Leeds City. He was successful, but Brighton initially refused to release him as he still had two years to run on his contract. After protracted negotiations, the Brighton board agreed to release him once they had found a replacement.

Despite the financial difficulties at the club, Scott-Walford embarked on a huge team-building operation, spending £2,000 in his first season, a phenomenal amount of money at the time. He brought five players from Brighton. At that time, the role of manager was more administrative than tactical, with player selection normally being made by a committee of club directors. Scott-Walford managed to reverse this at Leeds and selected his own teams.

Leeds financial situation worsened while Scott-Walford was at the club, and in 1910 he paid players from his own pocket rather than see them go without. By September that year, the club owed him £3,500.

By 1911, this continuing problem forced him to sign untested players from lower leagues, including leagues in Ireland. The club also sold some of the top players to make ends meet. By 1912, Scott-Walford's health was deteriorating due to the pressure, and in that year a letter to the directors was published in the local press in which he stressed that he was unable to cope with the financial and other pressures unless things changed. This was taken as his resignation; however, he did leave the club amicably and was presented with a silver boat-shaped flower bowl, an inscribed gold medal and a silver mounted oak biscuit box (for his wife) by the club.

=== Coventry City ===
Frank Scott-Walford joined Coventry city in 1914 with war looming over Europe. Coventry had just been relegated and he struggled to find 11 men fit enough to take to the field. The season was wound up in 1915 due to the war, with Scott-Walford once again owed wages by his club.

Nothing is known of his life after Coventry City.

== Personal appearance and other activities ==
Frank Scott-Walford was known as something of a dandy and sported a flamboyant waxed moustache. He was also known for varied headgear appearing at different times in a straw boater, a bowler hat or a cap. He also wore plus fours and was known for his buttonholes.

He was also a keen cricketer and cyclist and was a Freemason.
