= 2026–27 Brighton & Hove Albion F.C. season =

125th season in existence of Brighton & Hove Albion FC

Brighton & Hove Albion
2026–27 season
- Owner: Tony Bloom
- Chairman: Tony Bloom
- Head coach: Fabian Hürzeler
- Stadium: Falmer Stadium
- Premier League: 2nd
- FA Cup: Third round
- EFL Cup: Fourth round
- UEFA Conference League: League phase
- Top goalscorer: League: Pascal Groß (4); All: Pascal Groß; Charalampos Kostoulas (5 each)
- Highest home attendance: 31,944 (vs Arsenal, Premier League – 19 September 2026)
- Lowest home attendance: 21,840 (vs Kauno Žalgiris, UEFA Conference League – 15 October 2026)
- Average home league attendance: 31,684
- Biggest win: 5–0 vs Coventry City (A) (Premier League – 13 September 2026); 5–0 vs Crystal Palace (H) (Premier League – 18 October 2026)
- Biggest defeat: 0–2 vs Liverpool (A) (Premier League – 25 October 2026); 0–2 vs Hull City (A) (Premier League – 22 November 2026)
Home colours	Away colours	Third colours
- All statistics correct as of 22 November 2026.

The 2026–27 season is the 125th season in the history of Brighton & Hove Albion, and their tenth consecutive season in the Premier League. In addition to the domestic league, the club also participate in the FA Cup, the EFL Cup, and the UEFA Conference League, the latter being their first season back in a European competition since the 2023–24 campaign.

== Transfers and contracts ==
=== In ===
Date	Pos.	Player	From	Fee	Ref.
First team
15 June 2026	RB	(Portugal) Costinha	(Greece) Olympiacos	£11,000,000	
15 June 2026 (Note: The transfer was announced on 6 June, and became official on June 15 when the transfer window opened.)	RW	(Nigeria) Zadok Yohanna	(Sweden) AIK	£21,500,000	
30 June 2026	CB	(Netherlands) Pascal Struijk	(England) Leeds United	£15,000,000 (Note: Includes a potential further £3,000,000 with add-ons.)	
1 July 2026	RW	(Portugal) Rodrigo Rêgo	(Portugal) Benfica	£3,000,000	
2 July 2026	CB	(Austria) Michael Svoboda	(Italy) Venezia	£4,300,000	
14 July 2026	CB	(Croatia) Luka Vušković	(England) Tottenham Hotspur	£46,000,000 (Note: Includes a potential further £4,000,000 with add-ons.)	
25 August 2026	LB	(Algeria) Jaouen Hadjam	(Switzerland) Young Boys	£10,300,000	
1 September 2026	DM	(Spain) Chema Andrés	(Germany) VfB Stuttgart	£15,500,000	
2 September 2026	RW	(Nigeria) Femi Azeez	(England) Millwall	£12,500,000 (Note: Includes a further potential £2,500,000 in future add-ons.)	
Academy
19 June 2026	CF	(England) George Munday	(England) Cambridge United	Undisclosed	
4 July 2026	GK	(England) Oliver Mayer	(England) Fulham	Free	
1 August 2026	CF	(England) Valentin Joseph	(England) Blackburn Rovers	Undisclosed	
30 August 2026	DM	(Colombia) Matías Orozco	(Colombia) Deportivo Cali	£3,500,000	

=== Out ===
Date	Pos.	Player	To	Fee	Ref.
First team
15 June 2026 (Note: The transfer was announced on 28 May, and became official on June 15 when the tranfer window opened.)	LW	(Ecuador) Jeremy Sarmiento	(England) Middlesbrough	Undisclosed	
18 June 2026	CB	(Netherlands) Jan Paul van Hecke	(England) Tottenham Hotspur	£52,000,000	
16 July 2026	CB	(Italy) Diego Coppola	(France) Paris FC	£16,500,000 (Note: A potential further £3,500,000 in add-ons.)	
1 August 2026	CF	(England) Danny Welbeck	(England) Chelsea	£5,000,000	
4 August 2026	GK	(England) Carl Rushworth	(England) Coventry City	£22,500,000 (Note: A potential further £7,500,000 in add-ons.)	
25 August 2026	DM	(Cameroon) Carlos Baleba	(England) Manchester United	£65,000,000 (Note: A potential further £5,000,000 in add-ons)	
1 September 2026	CB	(Brazil) Igor Julio	(England) Burnley	Undisclosed	
Academy
Date	Pos.	Player	To	Fee	Ref.
1 September 2026	LW	(England) Caylan Vickers	(England) Burton Albion	£100,000	

=== Loaned in ===
Date	Pos.	Player	From	Loaned until	Ref.
First team
18 August 2026	CF	(Canada) Promise David	(Belgium) Union Saint-Gilloise	End of Season (Note: Obligation to make the move permanent should certain criteria be met.)	
Academy

=== Loaned out ===
Date	Pos.	Player	To	Date until	Ref.
First team
13 July 2026	CAM	(Germany) Brajan Gruda	(Germany) RB Leipzig	End of Season	
18 July 2026	RW	(Portugal) Rodrigo Rêgo	(Spain) Castellón	End of Season	
1 August 2026	LW	(England) Tommy Watson	(England) Leicester City	End of Season	
7 August 2026	CAM	(Argentina) Facundo Buonanotte	(Spain) Elche	End of Season	
1 September 2026	CB	(Republic of Ireland) Eiran Cashin	(England) Derby County	End of Season	
1 September 2026	RW	(England) Amario Cozier-Duberry	(England) Middlesbrough	End of Season	
Academy
5 July 2026	RW	(South Korea) Yoon Do-young	(Germany) 1. FC Magdeburg	End of Season	
17 July 2026	GK	(Sweden) Nils Ramming	(England) Rochdale	End of Season	
17 July 2026	GK	(England) James Beadle	(England) Birmingham City	End of Season	
13 August 2026	AM	(England) Harry Howell	(England) Leicester City	End of Season	
1 September 2026	AM	(England) Kamari Doyle	(England) Leicester City	End of Season	
1 September 2026	CF	(Republic of Ireland) Mark O'Mahony	(England) Burton Albion	End of Season	
1 September 2026	DM	(Colombia) Matías Orozco	(Spain) Castellón	End of Season	
1 September 2026	CB	(England) Freddie Simmonds	(England) AFC Wimbledon	End of Season	
1 September 2026	RB	(England) Charlie Tasker	(England) Rochdale	End of Season	
2 September 2026	CM	(England) Josh Robertson	(England) Fleetwood Town	1 January 2027	
18 September 2026	GK	(Republic of Ireland) Michael Dike	(England) Horsham	Short Term	
24 September 2026	LB	(Republic of Ireland) Sean Keogh	(England) Southend United	October 2026	

=== Released / Out of contract ===
Date	Pos.	Player	Subsequent club	Join date	Ref.
First team
1 June 2026	CM	(England) James Milner	Retired		
30 June 2026	RB	(Netherlands) Joël Veltman	(England) West Ham United	6 August 2026	
30 June 2026	RW	(England) Solly March			
30 June 2026	CB	(England) Adam Webster			
Academy
30 June 2026	CM	(England) Zane Albarus	(England) Gillingham	1 July 2026	
30 June 2026	LB	(England) Billy-Ray Cullinane	(England) Coventry City	1 July 2026	
30 June 2026	RB	(England) Matthew Hayden	(England) Eastbourne Borough	1 July 2026	
30 June 2026	CB	(England) Charlie Penman	(England) Hartlepool United	1 July 2026	
30 June 2026	LB	(Republic of Ireland) Jacob Slater	(England) Tranmere Rovers	1 July 2026	
30 June 2026	GK	(England) Will Rutter	(England) West Bromwich Albion	2 July 2026	
30 June 2026	GK	(England) Finley Taylor	(England) Blackburn Rovers	23 July 2026	
30 June 2026	CDM	(Ghana) Yussif Owusu	(Spain) Sabadell	1 September 2026	
30 June 2026	LWB	(Cyprus) Harry Mills	(England) Totton	5 September 2026	
30 June 2026	CB	(Germany) Noël Atom			
30 June 2026	CF	(Wales) Joe Belmont			
30 June 2026	GK	(Denmark) Sebastian Jensen			

=== New contracts ===
Date	Pos.	Player	Contract expiry	Ref.
First team
14 August 2026	CM	(Paraguay) Diego Gómez	30 June 2031	
1 September 2026	RW	(England) Amario Cozier-Duberry	30 June 2029	
20 November 2026	CM	(Germany) Pascal Groß	30 June 2028	
Academy
30 June 2026	LW	(Nigeria) Nehemiah Oriola	30 June 2029	
16 July 2026	CB	(Norway) Sebastian Ademola	Undisclosed (Note: First professional contract)	
16 July 2026	CB	(Philippines) Isaiah Alakiu	Undisclosed	
16 July 2026	CF	(Wales) Adam Brett	Undisclosed	
16 July 2026	LB	(England) Liam Crutchett	Undisclosed	
16 July 2026	CB	(England) Tate Ferdinand	Undisclosed	
16 July 2026	CAM	(Egypt) Younes Ibrahim	Undisclosed	
16 July 2026	RW	(Wales) Henry Kasvosve	Undisclosed	
16 July 2026	CM	(England) Jesse Middleton	Undisclosed	
16 July 2026	LB	(England) Theo Outen	Undisclosed	
17 July 2026	GK	(England) James Beadle	30 June 2030	
6 August 2026	GK	(Australia) Steven Hall	30 June 2028	
13 August 2026	AM	(England) Harry Howell	30 June 2029	
1 September 2026	DF	(England) Freddie Simmonds	30 June 2030	

== Pre-season and friendlies ==
On 25 June, Brighton announced two home pre-season friendlies against Serie A clubs Roma and Bologna. On 6 July, two behind closed doors fixtures in France were confirmed against Annecy and Strasbourg.The training camp in France was abandoned due to the pitch being unusable, but was rearranged in Austria .

Win Draw Loss Cancelled Fixtures

18 July 2026 Friendly	Brighton & Hove Albion	4–1	Wycombe Wanderers	Lancing
	Kostoulas 15', 25'; Osman 35'; Rutter 80'	Report	Harvie 44'	Stadium: American Express Elite Football Performance Centre; Attendance: 0 (Behind closed doors)

25 July 2026 Friendly	FC Annecy	Cancelled	Brighton & Hove Albion	Évian-les-Bains, France
20:00 CEST		Report		Stadium: Stade Camille Fournier

1 August 2026 Friendly	Strasbourg	3–4	Brighton & Hove Albion	Vienna, Austria
11:00 BST	Godo 9'; Amo-Ameyaw 15'; Kodia 119'	Report	Groß 24' (pen.); Boscagli 30'; Cashin 48'; Osman 103' (pen.)	Stadium: ÖFB Campus; Attendance: 0 (Behind closed doors)

8 August 2026 Friendly	Brighton & Hove Albion	3–0	Roma	Falmer
15:00 BST	Rutter 29'; Ayari 40', 49'	Report		Stadium: Falmer Stadium; Referee: Robert Madley

15 August 2026 Friendly	Brighton & Hove Albion	1–0	Bologna	Falmer
15:00 BST	Hinshelwood 59'	Report		Stadium: Falmer Stadium

== Competitions ==
=== Overall record ===
Competition	First match	Last match	Starting round	Final position	Record							
Competition	First match	Last match	Starting round	Final position	Pld	W	D	L	GF	GA	GD	Win %
Premier League	23 August 2026	30 May 2027	Matchday 1		11	7	1	3	26	9	+17	63.64
FA Cup	January 2027		Third round		0	0	0	0	0	0	+0	—
EFL Cup	16 September 2026	28 October 2026	Third round	Fourth round	2	1	1	0	5	4	+1	50.00
UEFA Conference League	20 August 2026		Play-off round		5	3	2	0	9	0	+9	60.00
Total					18	11	4	3	40	13	+27	61.11

Last updated: 22 November 2026
Source: Soccerway

=== Premier League ===
==== League table ====
Pos	Team	Pld	W	D	L	GF	GA	GD	Pts	Qualification or relegation
1	Arsenal	11	9	1	1	17	7	+10	28	Qualification for the Champions League league phase
2	Brighton & Hove Albion	11	7	1	3	26	9	+17	22	Qualification for the Champions League league phase
3	Manchester City	11	7	1	3	22	14	+8	22	Qualification for the Champions League league phase
4	Bournemouth	11	5	3	3	18	14	+4	18	Qualification for the Champions League league phase
5	Liverpool	10	5	3	2	14	10	+4	18	Qualification for the Europa League league phase (Note: The winners of the 2026–27 FA Cup and the 5th-placed team both qualify for the Europa League. If the FA Cup winners finish in the top five, the 6th-placed team will qualify. If England are one of the two associations with the highest UEFA coefficient points, 5th place will qualify for the Champions League and the other qualifying spots will move down one position.)

Updated to match(es) played on 22 November 2026. Source: Premier League
Rules for classification: 1) Points; 2) Goal difference; 3) Goals scored; 4) If the champions, relegated teams or qualified teams for UEFA competitions cannot be determined by rules 1 to 3 following the completion of the competition, rules 4.1 to 4.3 are applied between such teams – 4.1) Head-to-head points; 4.2) Head-to-head away goals; 4.3) Play-off at a neutral site.

==== Results summary ====
Overall								Home						Away					
Pld	W	D	L	GF	GA	GD	Pts	W	D	L	GF	GA	GD	W	D	L	GF	GA	GD
11	7	1	3	26	9	+17	22	4	1	0	15	1	+14	3	0	3	11	8	+3

Last updated: 22 November 2026.
Source: Soccerway

==== Results by round ====
Round	1	2	3	4	5	6	7	8	9	10	11	12	13	14	15	16	17	18	19	20	21	22	23	24	25	26	27	28	29	30	31	32	33	34	35	36	37	38
Ground	H	A	H	A	H	A	H	A	A	H	A	H	A	A	H	H	A	A	H	H	A	H	A	H	A	H	A	H	A	H	A	H	A	H	H	A	H	A
Result	W	L	D	W	W	W	W	L	W	W	L																											
Position	1	9	10	5	3	3	3	3	3	2	2																											
Points	3	3	4	7	10	13	16	16	19	22	22																											

Updated to match(es) played on 22 November 2026. Source: Soccerway
A = Away; H = Home; W = Win; D = Draw; L = Loss; P = Postponed

==== Matches ====
On 19 June 2026, the Premier League fixtures were released.

Win Draw Loss Fixtures

23 August 2026 1	Brighton & Hove Albion	4–0	Aston Villa	Falmer
14:00 BST	Lindelöf 8' (o.g.); Groß (yellow card) 10'; Ayari (yellow card) 11'; De Cuyper 18'; Hinshelwood 30', 31'	Report	João Gomes (yellow card) 9', (red card) 40'; McGinn (yellow card) 33'; Cash (yellow card) 90+5'	Stadium: Falmer Stadium; Attendance: 31,746; Referee: Peter Bankes

30 August 2026 2	Chelsea	4–3	Brighton & Hove Albion	Fulham
14:00 BST	Lavia 4'; Neto 14'; João Pedro 32'; Fofana (yellow card) 55'; Palmer 74'	Report	Yalcouyé 35'; João Pedro 63' (o.g.); Dunk (yellow card) 70'; Boscagli (yellow card) 89'; Costinha (yellow card) 90+1'; Groß 90+6'	Stadium: Stamford Bridge; Attendance: 39,494; Referee: Michael Oliver
Note: Fixture was initially scheduled for 29 August, but was rescheduled due to Brighton's involvement in the UEFA Conference League on the preceding Thursday.

5 September 2026 3	Brighton & Hove Albion	1–1	Leeds United	Falmer
15:00 BST	Groß (yellow card) 38'; De Cuyper (yellow card) 49'; Vušković 71'; David (yellow card) 88'	Report	Bogle (yellow card) 6', (goal) 15'; Calvert-Lewin (yellow card) 64'; Wilson (yellow card) 85'	Stadium: Falmer Stadium; Attendance: 31,661; Referee: Stuart Attwell

13 September 2026 4	Coventry City	0–5	Brighton & Hove Albion	Coventry
14:00 BST	Awoniyi (red card) 53'	Report	Kostoulas 35'; Yalcouyé 51'; Groß 70' (pen.); Dunk 83'; Ayari 90+4'	Stadium: Coventry Building Society Arena; Attendance: 31,492; Referee: Tony Harrington
Note: Fixture was initially scheduled for 12 September, but was rescheduled for live Sky Sports broadcasting.

19 September 2026 5	Brighton & Hove Albion	3–0	Arsenal	Falmer
15:00 BST	Groß 31'; Kostoulas (yellow card) 33', (goal) 45'; Kadıoğlu (yellow card) 45+1'; Andrés 57'; Struijk (yellow card) 71'; De Cuyper (yellow card) 90+1'	Report	Rice (yellow card) 90+7'	Stadium: Falmer Stadium; Attendance: 31,944; Referee: Darren England

10 October 2026 6	Sunderland	0–2	Brighton & Hove Albion	Sunderland
15:00 BST		Report	Boscagli (yellow card) 36'; De Cuyper 53'; Struijk (red card) 57'; Hadjam 90+3'	Stadium: Stadium of Light; Attendance: 47,196; Referee: Thomas Bramall

18 October 2026 7	Brighton & Hove Albion	5–0	Crystal Palace	Falmer
14:00 BST	Canvot 4' (o.g.); Gómez 7'; Ayari 10'; Groß (yellow card) 29'; Kostoulas 49'; Andrés (yellow card) 64'; Hinshelwood 84'	Report	Kamada (yellow card) 51'	Stadium: Falmer Stadium; Attendance: 31,440; Referee: Robert Jones
Note: Fixture was originally scheduled for 17 October, but was moved due to both teams' involvement in European matches on the preceding Thursday.

25 October 2026 8	Liverpool	2–0	Brighton & Hove Albion	Liverpool
14:00 BST	Groß 17' (o.g.); Isak 21'	Report	Boscagli (yellow card) 45+3'; Costinha (yellow card) 73'	Stadium: Anfield; Attendance: 60,404; Referee: Sam Barrott
Note: Fixture was initially scheduled for 24 October, but was rescheduled due to Brighton's involvement in the UEFA Conference League on the preceding Thursday.

31 October 2026 9	Manchester City	0–1	Brighton & Hove Albion	Manchester
15:00 GMT		Report	Ayari 11'; Andrés (yellow card) 20'; De Cuyper (yellow card) 49'; Groß (yellow card) 81'	Stadium: Etihad Stadium; Attendance: 60,503; Referee: Craig Pawson

8 November 2026 10	Brighton & Hove Albion	2–0	Brentford	Falmer
14:00 GMT	Gómez 15'; Andrés (yellow card) 22'; Boscagli (yellow card) 27'; Groß 42' (pen.); Wieffer (yellow card) 51'; Dunk (yellow card) 61'	Report	Ajer (yellow card) 5'; Thiago (red card) 23'; Schade (yellow card) 69'	Stadium: Falmer Stadium; Attendance: 31,629; Referee: Michael Oliver
Note: Fixture was initially scheduled for 7 November, but was rescheduled due to Brighton's involvement in the UEFA Conference League on the preceding Thursday.

22 November 2026 11	Hull City	2–0	Brighton & Hove Albion	Kingston upon Hull
14:00 GMT	Mendy (yellow card) 37'; Gourna-Douath (yellow card) 59'; McBurnie 90+2', 90+5'	Report	Vušković (yellow card) 34'; Costinha (yellow card) 63' (yellow-red card) 89'; Andrés (yellow card) 81'	Stadium: MKM Stadium; Attendance: 24,261; Referee: Peter Bankes
Note: Fixture was initially scheduled for 21 November, but was pushed back a day for live Sky Sports broadcasting.

29 November 2026 12	Brighton & Hove Albion	v	Newcastle United	Falmer
14:00 GMT				Stadium: Falmer Stadium
Note: Fixture was initially scheduled for 28 November, but was rescheduled due to Brighton's involvement in the UEFA Conference League on the preceding Thursday.

2 December 2026 13	Bournemouth	v	Brighton & Hove Albion	Bournemouth
20:15 GMT				Stadium: Dean Court
Note: Fixture was initially scheduled for a 20:00 kick-off, but was pushed back fifteen minutes for live Sky Sports broadcasting.

5 December 2026 14	Nottingham Forest	v	Brighton & Hove Albion	West Bridgford
17:30 GMT				Stadium: City Ground
Note: Fixture was initially scheduled for a 15:00 kick-off, but was pushed back for live Sky Sports broadcasting.

13 December 2026 15	Brighton & Hove Albion	v	Everton	Falmer
14:00 GMT				Stadium: Falmer Stadium
Note: Fixture was initially scheduled for 12 December, but was rescheduled due to Brighton's involvement in the UEFA Conference League on the preceding Thursday.

20 December 2026 16	Brighton & Hove Albion	v	Ipswich Town	Falmer
14:00 GMT				Stadium: Falmer Stadium
Note: Fixture was initially scheduled for 19 December, but was rescheduled due to Brighton's involvement in the UEFA Conference League on the preceding Thursday.

26 December 2026 17	Fulham	v	Brighton & Hove Albion	Fulham
15:00 GMT				Stadium: Craven Cottage

29 December 2026 18	Tottenham Hotspur	v	Brighton & Hove Albion	Tottenham
19:30 GMT				Stadium: Tottenham Hotspur Stadium
Note: Fixture was initially scheduled for 30 December, but was brought forward a day for live Sky Sports broadcasting.

2 January 2027 19	Brighton & Hove Albion	v	Manchester United	Falmer
12:30 GMT				Stadium: Falmer Stadium
Note: Fixture was initially scheduled for a 15:00 kick-off, but was brought forward for live TNT Sports broadcasting.

5 January 2027 20	Brighton & Hove Albion	v	Bournemouth	Falmer
19:30 GMT				Stadium: Falmer Stadium
Note: Fixture was initially scheduled for 6 January, but was brought forward a day for live Sky Sports broadcasting.

18 January 2027 21	Brentford	v	Brighton & Hove Albion	Brentford
20:00 GMT				Stadium: Brentford Community Stadium
Note: Fixture was initially scheduled for 16 January 2026 at 15:00, but was rescheduled for live Sky Sports broadcasting.

23 January 2027 22	Brighton & Hove Albion	v	Manchester City	Falmer
20:00 GMT				Stadium: Falmer Stadium
Note: Fixture was initially scheduled for a 15:00 kick-off, but was rescheduled for live TNT Sports broadcasting.

30 January 2027 23	Newcastle United	v	Brighton & Hove Albion	Newcastle upon Tyne
15:00 GMT				Stadium: St James' Park

6 February 2027 24	Brighton & Hove Albion	v	Hull City	Falmer
15:00 GMT				Stadium: Falmer Stadium

10 February 2027 25	Manchester United	v	Brighton & Hove Albion	Trafford
19:45 GMT				Stadium: Old Trafford

20 February 2027 26	Brighton & Hove Albion	v	Tottenham Hotspur	Falmer
15:00 GMT				Stadium: Falmer Stadium

27 February 2027 27	Ipswich Town	v	Brighton & Hove Albion	Ipswich
15:00 GMT				Stadium: Portman Road

3 March 2027 28	Brighton & Hove Albion	v	Fulham	Falmer
19:45 GMT				Stadium: Falmer Stadium

13 March 2027 29	Leeds United	v	Brighton & Hove Albion	Leeds
15:00 GMT				Stadium: Elland Road

20 March 2027 30	Brighton & Hove Albion	v	Coventry City	Falmer
15:00 GMT				Stadium: Falmer Stadium

10 April 2027 31	Aston Villa	v	Brighton & Hove Albion	Birmingham
15:00 BST				Stadium: Villa Park

17 April 2027 32	Brighton & Hove Albion	v	Chelsea	Falmer
15:00 BST				Stadium: Falmer Stadium

24 April 2025 33	Everton	v	Brighton & Hove Albion	Liverpool
15:00 BST				Stadium: Hill Dickinson Stadium

1 May 2027 34	Brighton & Hove Albion	v	Nottingham Forest	Falmer
15:00 BST				Stadium: Falmer Stadium

8 May 2027 35	Brighton & Hove Albion	v	Sunderland	Falmer
15:00 BST				Stadium: Falmer Stadium

15 May 2027 36	Crystal Palace	v	Brighton & Hove Albion	Selhurst
15:00 BST				Stadium: Selhurst Park

23 May 2027 37	Brighton & Hove Albion	v	Liverpool	Falmer
15:00 BST				Stadium: Falmer Stadium

30 May 2027 38	Arsenal	v	Brighton & Hove Albion	Holloway
16:00 BST				Stadium: Emirates Stadium

=== FA Cup ===
As a Premier League club, Brighton enter the competition in the third round.

Win Draw Loss Fixtures

=== EFL Cup ===
As a Premier League club competing in a European competition, Brighton entered the EFL Cup in the third round, and were drawn away to Manchester United. They were then drawn away to Manchester City in the fourth round.

Win Draw Loss Fixtures

16 September 2026 Third round	Manchester United	2–3	Brighton & Hove Albion	Trafford
20:00 BST	Lacey 8'; Mount 10'	Report	Andrés (yellow card) 43'; Kostoulas 45+1'; Hadjam (yellow card) 59'; Groß 65'; De Cuyper 69', (yellow card) 90+1'; Ayari (yellow card) 85'	Stadium: Old Trafford; Attendance: 73,670; Referee: Farai Hallam

28 October 2026 Fourth round	Manchester City	2–2 (4–3 p)	Brighton & Hove Albion	Manchester
19:30 GMT	Bouaddi (yellow card) 32'; Kovačić 40'; Vitor Reis 72'	Report	Svoboda (yellow card) 11'; Yalcouyé 30'; Rutter 47'; Wieffer (yellow card) 90+1'; Dunk (yellow card) 90+2'	Stadium: Etihad Stadium; Attendance: 49,107; Referee: Andy Madley
	Penalties
	Foden (penalty scored); Fernández (penalty scored); Doku (penalty scored); Kovačić (penalty missed); Cherki (penalty scored)		(penalty scored) Groß; (penalty scored) O'Riley; (penalty scored) De Cuyper; (penalty missed) Ayari; (penalty missed) Dunk

=== UEFA Conference League ===
==== Play-off round ====
Brighton were drawn against Tromsø in the play-off round.

Win Draw Loss Fixtures

20 August 2026 First leg	Tromsø (Norway)	0–0	(England) Brighton & Hove Albion	Tromsø, Norway
19:00 CEST		Report	Vušković (yellow card) 48'; Kadıoğlu (yellow card) 59'	Stadium: Romssa Arena; Attendance: 6,015; Referee: Edgars Maļcevs (Latvia)

27 August 2026 Second leg	Brighton & Hove Albion (England)	4–0 (4–0 agg.)	(Norway) Tromsø	Falmer, England
19:30 BST	Kostoulas 22'; De Cuyper 33'; Wieffer 38'; Boscagli 86'	Report	Warneryd (yellow card) 44'	Stadium: Falmer Stadium; Attendance: 23,981; Referee: Sander van der Eijk (Netherlands)

==== League phase ====
Brighton were drawn against Kauno Žalgiris, Universitatea Craiova, and Monaco at home, and Jablonec, Getafe, and Panathinaikos away in the league phase.

Pos	Team	Pld	W	D	L	GF	GA	GD	Pts	Qualification
3	(Netherlands) Twente	3	3	0	0	8	2	+6	9	Advance to round of 16 (seeded)
4	(France) Monaco	3	3	0	0	7	1	+6	9	Advance to round of 16 (seeded)
5	(England) Brighton & Hove Albion	3	2	1	0	5	0	+5	7	Advance to round of 16 (seeded)
6	(Norway) Brann	3	2	1	0	7	3	+4	7	Advance to round of 16 (seeded)
7	(Denmark) Copenhagen	3	2	1	0	7	3	+4	7	Advance to round of 16 (seeded)

Updated to match(es) played on 5 November 2026. Source: UEFA
Rules for classification: League phase tiebreakers

Round	1	2	3	4	5	6
Ground	H	A	A	H	H	A
Result	W	D	W			
Position	1	9	5			
Points	3	4	7			

Updated to match(es) played on 5 November 2026. Source: UEFA
A = Away; H = Home; W = Win; D = Draw; L = Loss

Win Draw Loss Fixtures

15 October 2026 1	Brighton & Hove Albion (England)	4–0	(Lithuania) Kauno Žalgiris	Falmer, England
20:00 BST	Rutter 41', 54'; Hinshelwood 45+2'; O'Riley 67'	Report	Ourega (yellow card) 12'	Stadium: Falmer Stadium; Attendance: 21,840; Referee: Mikkel Redder (Denmark)

22 October 2026 2	Jablonec (Czech Republic)	0–0	(England) Brighton & Hove Albion	Jablonec nad Nisou, Czech Republic
18:45 CEST	Nebyla (yellow card) 65'; Růsek (yellow card) 73'; Pavlović (yellow card) 77'; Cedidla (yellow card) 85'	Report	Costinha (yellow card) 70'	Stadium: Stadion Střelnice; Attendance: 6,144; Referee: Sigurd Kringstad (Norway)

5 November 2026 3	Getafe (Spain)	0–1	(England) Brighton & Hove Albion	Getafe, Spain
21:00 CET	Mojica (yellow card) 86'	Report	Costinha (yellow card) 33'; Hadjam (yellow card) 58'; Yalcouyé 64'; Svoboda (yellow card) 83'; Rutter (yellow card) 84'	Stadium: Coliseum; Attendance: 8,007; Referee: Filip Glova (Slovakia)

26 November 2026 4	Brighton & Hove Albion (England)	v	(Romania) Universitatea Craiova	Falmer, England
17:45 GMT		Report		Stadium: Falmer Stadium

10 December 2026 5	Brighton & Hove Albion (England)	v	(France) Monaco	Falmer, England
20:00 GMT		Report		Stadium: Falmer Stadium

17 December 2026 6	Panathinaikos (Greece)	v	(England) Brighton & Hove Albion	Athens, Greece
22:00 EET		Report		Stadium: Olympic Stadium

== Statistics ==
=== Appearances and goals ===
As of match played 22 November 2026

Players with no appearances are not included on the list; italics indicate a loaned in player.

No.	Pos	Nat	Player	Total		Premier League		FA Cup		EFL Cup		Conference League	
No.	Pos	Nat	Player	Apps	Goals	Apps	Goals	Apps	Goals	Apps	Goals	Apps	Goals
1	GK	(Netherlands) NED	Bart Verbruggen	16	0	11+0	0	0+0	0	0	0	5+0	0
3	DF	(Algeria) ALG	Jaouen Hadjam	7	1	0+3	1	0+0	0	2	0	2+0	0
4	DF	(Netherlands) NED	Pascal Struijk	6	0	2+2	0	0+0	0	1	0	0+1	0
5	DF	(England) ENG	Lewis Dunk	14	1	9+1	1	0+0	0	0+1	0	3+0	0
8	MF	(England) ENG	Jack Hinshelwood	11	4	1+5	3	0+0	0	1	0	3+1	1
10	FW	(France) FRA	Georginio Rutter	14	3	2+6	0	0+0	0	1+1	1	4+0	2
11	MF	(The Gambia) GAM	Yankuba Minteh	3	0	0+2	0	0+0	0	0+1	0	0+0	0
12	FW	(Canada) CAN	Promise David	4	0	0+2	0	0+0	0	0	0	0+2	0
13	MF	(Germany) GER	Pascal Groß	18	5	11+0	4	0+0	0	2	1	5+0	0
14	MF	(Spain) ESP	Chema Andrés	10	1	7+1	1	0+0	0	1	0	0+1	0
15	MF	(Ghana) GHA	Ibrahim Osman	9	0	0+4	0	0+0	0	0	0	3+2	0
19	FW	(Greece) GRE	Charalampos Kostoulas	14	5	9+2	3	0+0	0	1	1	1+1	1
20	DF	(Portugal) POR	Costinha	16	0	3+7	0	0+0	0	2	0	3+1	0
21	DF	(France) FRA	Olivier Boscagli	18	1	11+0	0	0+0	0	2	0	5+0	1
23	GK	(England) ENG	Jason Steele	2	0	0+0	0	0+0	0	2	0	0+0	0
24	DF	(Turkey) TUR	Ferdi Kadıoğlu	11	0	7+1	0	0+0	0	0+1	0	1+1	0
25	MF	(Paraguay) PAR	Diego Gómez	16	2	11+0	2	0+0	0	1+1	0	2+1	0
26	MF	(Sweden) SWE	Yasin Ayari	17	3	10+0	3	0+0	0	1+1	0	3+2	0
27	DF	(Netherlands) NED	Mats Wieffer	7	1	2+2	0	0+0	0	0+1	0	2+0	1
29	DF	(Belgium) BEL	Maxim De Cuyper	17	4	11+0	2	0+0	0	0+2	1	1+3	1
30	DF	(Austria) AUT	Michael Svoboda	6	0	0+2	0	0+0	0	1	0	3+0	0
33	MF	(Denmark) DEN	Matt O'Riley	8	1	0+2	0	0+0	0	1+1	0	3+1	1
35	MF	(Ivory Coast) CIV	Malick Yalcouyé	17	4	3+7	2	0+0	0	2	1	4+1	1
36	MF	(Nigeria) NGR	Zadok Yohanna	3	0	0+1	0	0+0	0	0	0	0+2	0
44	DF	(Croatia) CRO	Luka Vušković	17	1	11+0	1	0+0	0	1	0	2+3	0
59	MF	(Egypt) EGY	Younes Ibrahim	1	0	0+0	0	0+0	0	0	0	0+1	0
Player who featured but departed the club on loan during the season:
22	MF	(England) ENG	Amario Cozier-Duberry	1	0	0	0	0	0	0	0	0+1	0

=== Goalscorers ===
As of match played 22 November 2026

Rank	No.	Pos.	Nat.	Player	Premier League	FA Cup	EFL Cup	Conference League	Total
1	13	CM	(Germany)	Pascal Groß	4	0	1	0	5
1	19	CF	(Greece)	Charalampos Kostoulas	3	0	1	1	5
3	8	CM	(England)	Jack Hinshelwood	3	0	0	1	4
3	29	LB	(Belgium)	Maxim De Cuyper	2	0	1	1	4
3	35	CM	(Ivory Coast)	Malick Yalcouyé	2	0	1	1	4
6	10	CF	(France)	Georginio Rutter	0	0	1	2	3
6	26	CM	(Sweden)	Yasin Ayari	3	0	0	0	3
8	25	CM	(Paraguay)	Diego Gómez	2	0	0	0	2
9	3	LB	(Algeria)	Jaouen Hadjam	1	0	0	0	1
9	5	CB	(England)	Lewis Dunk	1	0	0	0	1
9	14	DM	(Spain)	Chema Andrés	1	0	0	0	1
9	21	CB	(France)	Olivier Boscagli	0	0	0	1	1
9	27	CM	(Netherlands)	Mats Wieffer	0	0	0	1	1
9	33	CM	(Denmark)	Matt O'Riley	0	0	0	1	1
9	44	CB	(Croatia)	Luka Vušković	1	0	0	0	1
Own goals					3	0	0	0	3
Totals					26	0	5	9	40

=== Assists ===
As of match played 22 November 2026

Rank	No.	Pos.	Nat.	Player	Premier League	FA Cup	EFL Cup	Conference League	Total
1	10	CF	(France)	Georginio Rutter	2	0	1	1	4
1	13	CM	(Germany)	Pascal Groß	4	0	0	0	4
1	29	LB	(Belgium)	Maxim De Cuyper	3	0	0	1	4
4	19	CF	(Greece)	Charalampos Kostoulas	2	0	0	1	3
5	3	LB	(Algeria)	Jaouen Hadjam	0	0	2	0	2
5	15	LW	(Ghana)	Ibrahim Osman	0	0	0	2	2
5	25	CM	(Paraguay)	Diego Gómez	2	0	0	0	2
8	14	DM	(Spain)	Chema Andrés	1	0	0	0	1
8	20	RB	(Portugal)	Costinha	0	0	0	1	1
8	21	CB	(France)	Olivier Boscagli	1	0	0	0	1
8	44	CB	(Croatia)	Luka Vušković	0	0	1	0	1
8	59	CAM	(Egypt)	Younes Ibrahim	0	0	0	1	1
Totals					15	0	4	7	26

=== Clean sheets ===
As of match played 22 November 2026

Rank	No.	Nat.	Player	Matches played	Clean sheet %	Premier League	FA Cup	EFL Cup	Conference League	Total
1	1	(Netherlands)	Bart Verbruggen	16	75.00%	7	0	0	5	12
2	23	(England)	Jason Steele	2	0.00%	0	0	0	0	0
Totals				18	66.67%	7	0	0	5	12

=== Disciplinary record ===
As of match played 22 November 2026

Includes all competitive matches. The list is sorted by squad number when disciplinary points / points per card / number of cards are equal. Players with no cards not included in the list.

Rank	No.	Pos.	Nat.	Player	Premier League			FA Cup			EFL Cup			Conference League			Total			Points
Rank	No.	Pos.	Nat.	Player	Yellow card	(yellow card) (yellow-red card)	Red card	Yellow card	(yellow card) (yellow-red card)	Red card	Yellow card	(yellow card) (yellow-red card)	Red card	Yellow card	(yellow card) (yellow-red card)	Red card	Yellow card	(yellow card) (yellow-red card)	Red card	Points
1	20	RB	(Portugal)	Costinha	2	1	0	0	0	0	0	0	0	2	1	0	4	1	0	7
2	14	DM	(Spain)	Chema Andrés	4	0	0	0	0	0	1	0	0	0	0	0	5	0	0	5
3	13	CM	(Germany)	Pascal Groß	4	0	0	0	0	0	0	0	0	0	0	0	4	0	0	4
3	21	CB	(France)	Olivier Boscagli	4	0	0	0	0	0	0	0	0	0	0	0	4	0	0	4
3	29	LB	(Belgium)	Maxim De Cuyper	3	0	0	0	0	0	1	0	0	0	0	0	4	0	0	4
6	3	LB	(Algeria)	Jaouen Hadjam	0	0	0	0	0	0	1	0	0	1	0	0	2	0	0	2
6	5	CB	(England)	Lewis Dunk	1	0	0	0	0	0	1	0	0	0	0	0	2	0	0	2
6	24	LB	(Turkey)	Ferdi Kadıoğlu	1	0	0	0	0	0	0	0	0	1	0	0	2	0	0	2
6	26	CM	(Sweden)	Yasin Ayari	1	0	0	0	0	0	1	0	0	0	0	0	2	0	0	2
6	27	RB	(Netherlands)	Mats Wieffer	1	0	0	0	0	0	1	0	0	0	0	0	2	0	0	2
6	30	CB	(Austria)	Michael Svoboda	0	0	0	0	0	0	1	0	0	1	0	0	2	0	0	2
6	44	CB	(Croatia)	Luka Vušković	1	0	0	0	0	0	0	0	0	1	0	0	2	0	0	2
13	10	CF	(France)	Georginio Rutter	0	0	0	0	0	0	0	0	0	1	0	0	1	0	0	1
13	12	CF	(Canada)	Promise David	1	0	0	0	0	0	0	0	0	0	0	0	1	0	0	1
13	19	CF	(Greece)	Charalampos Kostoulas	1	0	0	0	0	0	0	0	0	0	0	0	1	0	0	1
–	4	CB	(Netherlands)	Pascal Struijk (Note: Struijk received a red card playing against Sunderland, but it was subsequently rescinded.)	0	0	~~1~~	0	0	0	0	0	0	0	0	0	0	0	~~1~~	0
Total					24	1	0	0	0	0	7	0	0	7	0	0	38	1	0	41

== Awards ==
=== Player Awards ===
==== Premier League Player of the Month ====
Month	Position	Player	G	A	CS	Result	Ref.
September	MF	(Germany) Pascal Groß	2	3	–	Won	
September	FW	(Greece) Charalampos Kostoulas	2	1	–	Nominated	
October	GK	(Netherlands) Bart Verbruggen	–	–	3	Nominated	
October	DF	(Croatia) Luka Vušković	0	0	3	Nominated	

==== Premier League Goal of the Month ====
Month	Pos.	Player	Opposition	Result	Ref.
September	DF	(England) Lewis Dunk	v. Coventry City	Won	
October	MF	(Paraguay) Diego Gómez	v. Crystal Palace	Won	

==== Premier League Save of the Month ====
Month	Player	Opposition	Result	Ref.
October	(Netherlands) Bart Verbruggen	v. Manchester City	Nominated	

==== PFA Premier League Fans' Player of the Month ====
Month	Position	Player	Result	Ref.
September	MF	(Germany) Pascal Groß	Won	
September	FW	(Greece) Charalampos Kostoulas	Nominated	
October	DF	(Belgium) Maxim De Cuyper	Nominated	

=== Manager Awards ===
==== Premier League Manager of the Month ====
Month	Manager	Matches	Won	Drawn	Lost	Goal Difference	Points	Result	Ref.
September	(Germany) Fabian Hürzeler	3	2	1	0	+8	7	Won	
October	(Germany) Fabian Hürzeler	4	3	0	1	+6	9	Nominated	
