= Younes Ibrahim =

Egyptian footballer (born 2008)

Personal information
- Full name: Younes Ahmed Ibrahim
- Date of birth: 15 February 2008 (age 18)
- Place of birth: Australia
- Position: Attacking midfielder

Team information
- Current team: Brighton & Hove Albion
- Number: 59

Youth career
- Luton Town
- Chelsea
- 2024–: Brighton & Hove Albion

Senior career*
Years	Team	Apps	(Gls)
2026–	Brighton & Hove Albion	0	(0)
- * Club domestic league appearances and goals as of 15 October 2026

Younes Ahmed Ibrahim (Arabic: يونس احمد ابراهيم; born 15 February 2008) is an Egyptian professional footballer who plays as an attacking midfielder for the academy of Premier League club Brighton & Hove Albion. Born in Australia, he has been called up to represent Egypt internationally at youth level.

== Early life ==
Ibrahim was born on 15 February 2008 in Australia. Of Moroccan and Egyptian descent through his parents, he moved with his family to England at the age of ten.

== Club career ==
As a youth player, Ibrahim joined the youth academy of English side Luton Town. Following his stint there, he joined the youth academy of Premier League outfit Chelsea. Subsequently, he joined the youth academy of Brighton & Hove Albion.

Ahead of the 2024–25 season, he was promoted to the club's under-18 team. During the summer of 2025, he signed his first professional contract with the Seagulls. The same year, he was promoted to their U21 team, helping them win the league title.

Ibrahim was involved with the senior squad for the first time, remaining an unused substitute in the 5–0 victory against Coventry City. He made his competitive debut as a substitute during the 4–0 victory over Kauno Žalgiris in the UEFA Conference League, assisting a goal for Matt O'Riley.

== International career ==
Ibrahim was called up to the Egypt national under-20 football team. Besides Egypt, he is eligible to represent Morocco, England, and Australia internationally and holds citizenship with all four countries.

== Style of play ==
Ibrahim plays as a midfielder and is left-footed. Besides midfielder, he can play as a winger and is known for his set piece ability.

Egyptian news website Masrawy wrote in 2026 that he "succeeded in attracting attention thanks to his speed and individual skills... is adept at playing in more than one attacking position, as he can participate as a pure striker, or as a withdrawn striker, in addition to the left winger, which gives him tactical flexibility and allows the coaching staff to benefit from his abilities in more than one position".

== Career statistics ==
As of match played 3 November 2026

Appearances and goals by club, season and competition
Club	Season	League			FA Cup		EFL Cup		Europe		Other		Total	
Club	Season	Division	Apps	Goals	Apps	Goals	Apps	Goals	Apps	Goals	Apps	Goals	Apps	Goals
Brighton & Hove Albion U21	2025–26	—									1 (Note: Appearance(s) in EFL Trophy)	0	1	0
Brighton & Hove Albion U21	2026–27	—									2	0	2	0
Brighton & Hove Albion U21	Total		—								3	0	3	0
Brighton & Hove Albion	2026–27	Premier League	0	0	0	0	0	0	1 (Note: Appearance in UEFA Conference League)	0	—		1	0
Career total			0	0	0	0	0	0	1	0	3	0	4	0
