= Charalampos Kostoulas =

Greek footballer (born 2007)

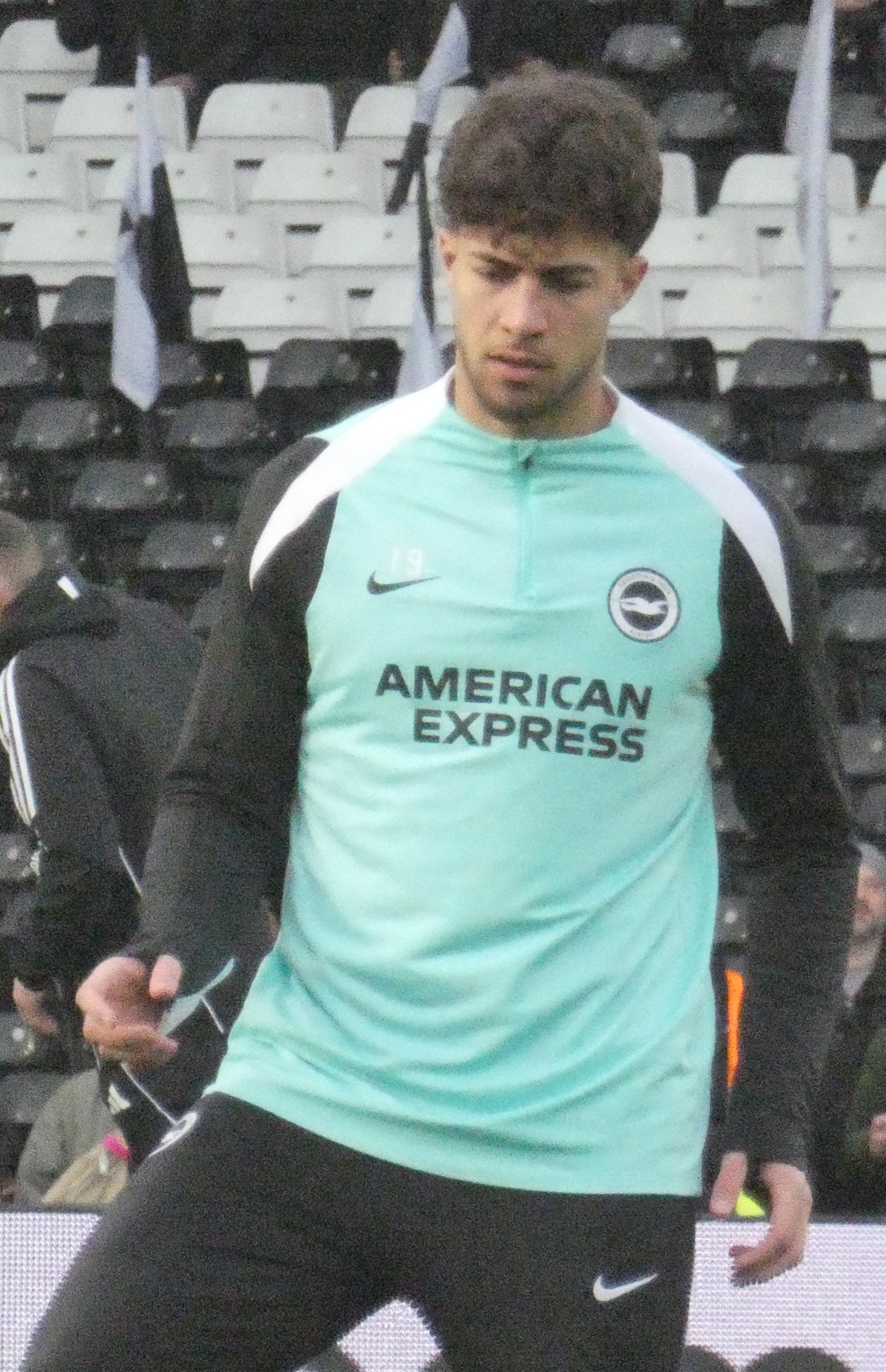
- Kostoulas with Brighton & Hove Albion in 2026

Personal information
- Date of birth: 30 May 2007 (age 19)
- Place of birth: Athens, Greece
- Height: 1.85 m (6 ft 1 in)
- Position: Forward

Team information
- Current team: Brighton & Hove Albion
- Number: 19

Youth career
- 2017–2019: Agia Anna Volos
- 2019–2022: Olympiacos

Senior career*
Years	Team	Apps	(Gls)
2022–2024	Olympiacos B	22	(3)
2024–2025	Olympiacos	22	(7)
2025–	Brighton & Hove Albion	31	(5)

International career^{‡}
2023	Greece U16	3	(2)
2022–2023	Greece U17	8	(1)
2023	Greece U19	6	(0)
2024–	Greece U21	5	(2)
2025–	Greece	7	(0)
- * Club domestic league appearances and goals as of 8 November 2026 ‡ National team caps and goals as of 16 October 2026

Charalampos Kostoulas (Greek: Χαράλαμπος Κωστούλας; born 30 May 2007) is a Greek professional footballer who plays as a forward for Premier League club Brighton & Hove Albion and the Greece national team.

== Club career ==
=== Olympiacos ===
Kostoulas started his career with Agia Anna Volou, before joining Olympiacos in 2019. He progressed through the academy, notably scoring sixteen goals in fifteen appearances in the 2021–22 season, as his side went on to win the under-15 championship. He signed his first professional contract with the club in September 2022.

He made his debut for the Olympiacos B team on 24 January 2023, coming on as a substitute for Giannis Karakoutis in a 4–0 Super League Greece 2 win against Irodotos, becoming the youngest player in the history of the club to play professionally, beating the record held by Kyriakos Papadopoulos.

=== Brighton & Hove Albion ===
On 12 June 2025, Kostoulas signed for Premier League club Brighton & Hove Albion on a five-year deal for a fee of €35 million. Later that year, on 25 October, he scored his first goal for the club in a 4–2 away defeat against Manchester United.

== International career ==
Kostoulas has represented Greece at under-21 level.

== Personal life ==
Hailing from a footballing family, Kostoulas is the son of former Greek international footballer Athanasios Kostoulas, while his brother, Konstantinos, plays for OFI.

== Career statistics ==
=== Club ===
As of match played 8 November 2026

Appearances and goals by club, season and competition
Club	Season	League			National cup (Note: Includes Greek Cup, FA Cup)		League cup (Note: Includes EFL Cup)		Europe		Total	
Club	Season	Division	Apps	Goals	Apps	Goals	Apps	Goals	Apps	Goals	Apps	Goals
Olympiacos B	2021–22	Super League Greece 2	2	0	—		—		—		2	0
Olympiacos B	2023–24	Super League Greece 2	20	3	—		—		—		20	3
Olympiacos B	Total		22	3	—		—		—		22	3
Olympiacos	2024–25	Super League Greece	22	7	5	0	—		8 (Note: Appearances in UEFA Europa League)	0	35	7
Brighton & Hove Albion	2025–26	Premier League	21	2	2	0	3	0	—		26	2
Brighton & Hove Albion	2026–27	Premier League	9	3	0	0	1	1	2 (Note: Appearances in UEFA Conference League)	1	12	5
Brighton & Hove Albion	Total		31	5	2	0	4	1	2	1	39	7
Career total			75	15	7	0	4	1	10	1	96	17

=== International ===
As of match played 16 October 2026

Appearances and goals by national team and year
National team	Year	Apps	Goals
Greece	2025	2	0
Greece	2026	5	0
Total		7	0

== Honours ==
Olympiacos Youth

- UEFA Youth League: 2023–24

Olympiacos

- Super League Greece: 2024–25
- Greek Football Cup: 2024–25

=== Individual ===
- Super League Greece 2 Young Player of the Season: 2023–24 (South Group)
- Super League Greece Player of the Month: December 2024
