= Rodrigo Rêgo (footballer, born 2005) =

Portuguese footballer

Personal information
- Full name: Rodrigo Miguel Ferreira Rêgo
- Date of birth: 3 January 2005 (age 21)
- Place of birth: Aveiro, Portugal
- Height: 1.73 m (5 ft 8 in)
- Position: Winger

Team information
- Current team: Castellón (on loan from Brighton & Hove Albion)
- Number: 26

Youth career
- 2012–2021: Porto
- 2021–2022: Famalicão
- 2022–2024: Benfica

Senior career*
Years	Team	Apps	(Gls)
2024–2026	Benfica B	23	(2)
2025–2026	Benfica	3	(0)
2026–	Brighton & Hove Albion	0	(0)
2026–	→ Castellón (loan)	6	(0)

International career^{‡}
2022	Portugal U17	2	(0)
2022	Portugal U21	5	(1)
- * Club domestic league appearances and goals as of 1 November 2026 ‡ National team caps and goals as of 6 October 2026

Rodrigo Miguel Ferreira Rêgo (born 3 January 2005) is a Portuguese professional footballer who plays as a winger for Segunda División club Castellón, on loan from Premier League club Brighton & Hove Albion.

== Club career ==
Rêgo is a product of the youth academies of the Portuguese clubs Porto, Famalicão, before moving to the youth academy of Benfica on 21 June 2022. On 9 May 2023, he exended his contract with Benfica and was promoted to their U23s. On 9 December 2024, he again extended his contract with Benfica and was promoted to their B-team. On 21 November 2025, he debuted with the senior Benfica team in a 2–0 Taça de Portugal win over Atlético CP, where he was named man of the match.

On 1 July 2026, Rego joined Premier League club Brighton & Hove Albion for an undisclosed fee, on a five-year contract. Seventeen days later, however, he was loaned to Segunda División side Castellón for the season.

== International career ==
Rego is a youth international for Portugal. In May 2022, he played for the Portugal U17s at the U17 Algarve Tournament.

== Career statistics ==
As of match played 1 November 2026

Appearances and goals by club, season and competition
Club	Season	League			National cup (Note: Includes Taça de Portugal and Copa del Rey)		Europe		Total	
Club	Season	Division	Apps	Goals	Apps	Goals	Apps	Goals	Apps	Goals
Benfica B	2024–25	Liga Portugal 2	2	0	–		–		2	0
Benfica B	2025–26	Liga Portugal 2	21	2	–		–		21	2
Benfica B	Total		23	2	–		–		23	2
Benfica	2025–26	Primeira Liga	3	0	1	0	1 (Note: Appearance in UEFA Champions League)	0	5	0
Brighton & Hove Albion	2026–27	Premier League	0	0	0	0	0	0	0	0
Castellón (loan)	2026–27	Segunda División	6	0	1	0	–		7	0
Career total			32	2	2	0	1	0	35	2
