= Georginio Rutter =

French footballer (born 2002)

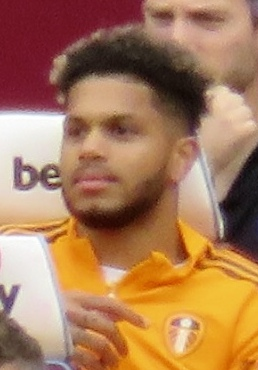
- Rutter with Leeds United in 2023

Personal information
- Full name: Georginio Rutter
- Date of birth: 20 April 2002 (age 24)
- Place of birth: Plescop, France
- Height: 1.82 m (6 ft 0 in)
- Positions: Striker; attacking midfielder

Team information
- Current team: Brighton & Hove Albion
- Number: 10

Youth career
- 2007–2014: Ménimur
- 2014–2017: Vannes
- 2017–2020: Rennes

Senior career*
Years	Team	Apps	(Gls)
2018–2020	Rennes II	22	(5)
2020–2021	Rennes	4	(0)
2021–2023	TSG Hoffenheim	57	(11)
2023–2024	Leeds United	57	(6)
2024–	Brighton & Hove Albion	67	(8)

International career
2017–2018	France U16	17	(12)
2018–2019	France U17	19	(5)
2019	France U18	10	(4)
2021	France U20	4	(0)
2022–2024	France U21	7	(0)
Medal record
Representing France
Men's football
FIFA U-17 World Cup
Third place	2019
- * Club domestic league appearances and goals as of 8 November 2026

Georginio Rutter (born 20 April 2002) is a French professional footballer who plays as a striker or attacking midfielder for Premier League club Brighton & Hove Albion.

== Early life ==
Georginio Rutter was born on 20 April 2002 in Plescop, Morbihan, France.

== Club career ==
=== Rennes ===
On 26 September 2020, Rutter made his professional debut for Rennes coming on for fellow Frenchman Eduardo Camavinga against Saint Étienne.

Rutter also played for Rennes II, making his league debut against Montagnarde on 25 August 2018. He scored his first league goal against La Tour Auvergne Rennes on 31 August 2019, scoring in the 27th minute.

=== TSG Hoffenheim ===
On 1 February 2021, Rutter signed for Bundesliga side TSG Hoffenheim. On 21 February 2021, he scored his first Bundesliga goal in a 4–0 win against Werder Bremen. On 14 August 2022, he scored in Hoffenheim's opening game of the Bundesliga season, in a 4–0 win against Augsburg at the WWK Arena.

On 27 November 2021, he scored twice in Hoffenheim's 6–3 win against Greuther Fürth at the Sportpark Ronhof.

=== Leeds United ===
On 14 January 2023, Rutter signed for Premier League side Leeds United on a five-and-a-half-year contract for a club record fee. He was later relegated to the Championship with the club at the end of the latter season. On 26 August 2023, Rutter scored his first goal for Leeds and first Championship goal against Ipswich Town.

=== Brighton and Hove Albion ===
On 19 August 2024, Rutter returned to the Premier League and signed with Brighton & Hove Albion, signing a five-year contract until 2029. He made his debut for the club on 24 August in a 2–1 home league win over Manchester United as a 90th-minute substitute for Yankuba Minteh. Rutter scored his first Albion goal on 28 September that year, opening the scoring with a header in an eventual 4–2 defeat against Chelsea.

== Personal life ==
Georginio is of Martiniquais descent through his father and of Réunionnais Malagasy descent through his mother.

Rutter is the owner of two race-horses; he announced his ownership of the first, Bopedro, in February 2024, before buying Coeur Jaune later that year. Both horses are trained by David O'Meara.

== Career statistics ==
As of match played 8 November 2026

Appearances and goals by club, season and competition
Club	Season	League			National cup (Note: Includes DFB-Pokal, FA Cup)		League cup (Note: Includes EFL Cup)		Europe		Other		Total	
Club	Season	Division	Apps	Goals	Apps	Goals	Apps	Goals	Apps	Goals	Apps	Goals	Apps	Goals
Rennes II	2018–19	Championnat National 3	10	0	—		—		—		—		10	0
Rennes II	2019–20	Championnat National 3	10	4	–		—		—		—		10	4
Rennes II	2020–21	Championnat National 3	2	1	—		—		—		—		2	1
Rennes II	Total		22	5	—		—		—		—		22	5
Rennes	2020–21	Ligue 1	4	0	0	0	—		1 (Note: Appearance in UEFA Champions League)	1	—		5	1
TSG Hoffenheim	2020–21	Bundesliga	9	1	0	0	—		2 (Note: Appearances in UEFA Europa League)	0	—		11	1
TSG Hoffenheim	2021–22	Bundesliga	33	8	3	0	—		—		—		36	8
TSG Hoffenheim	2022–23	Bundesliga	15	2	2	0	—		—		—		17	2
TSG Hoffenheim	Total		57	11	5	0	—		2	0	—		64	11
TSG Hoffenheim II	2020–21	Regionalliga Südwest	6	2	—		—		—		—		6	2
Leeds United	2022–23	Premier League	11	0	2	0	—		—		—		13	0
Leeds United	2023–24	Championship	45	6	2	1	1	0	—		3 (Note: Appearances in Championship play-offs)	1	51	8
Leeds United	2024–25	Championship	1	0	—		1	0	—		—		2	0
Leeds United	Total		57	6	4	1	2	0	—		3	1	66	8
Brighton & Hove Albion	2024–25	Premier League	28	5	4	3	—		—		—		32	8
Brighton & Hove Albion	2025–26	Premier League	32	3	2	0	1	0	—		—		35	3
Brighton & Hove Albion	2026–27	Premier League	7	0	0	0	2	1	4 (Note: Appearances in UEFA Conference League)	2	—		13	3
Brighton & Hove Albion	Total		67	8	6	3	3	1	4	2	—		80	14
Career total			213	32	15	4	5	1	7	3	3	1	243	41

== Honours ==
Individual

- EFL Championship Team of the Season: 2023–24
