= Brighton & Hove Albion F.C. =

Association football club in England

Brighton & Hove Albion
- Full name: Brighton & Hove Albion Football Club
- Nicknames: The Seagulls; The Albion
- Short name: Brighton
- Founded: 24 June 1901; 125 years ago
- Ground: Falmer Stadium
- Capacity: 32,176
- Coordinates: 50°51′42″N 0°5′1″W
- Owner: Tony Bloom
- Chairman: Tony Bloom
- Head coach: Fabian Hürzeler
- League: Premier League
- 2025–26: Premier League, 8th of 20
- Website: brightonandhovealbion.com
Home colours	Away colours	Third colours

Brighton & Hove Albion Football Club, commonly referred to as Brighton, is a professional football club based in Brighton and Hove, East Sussex, England. The club competes in the Premier League, the top tier of English football. Their home ground has been Falmer Stadium since 2011, having played at the Goldstone Ground for most of the 20th century.

Founded in 1901, Brighton played their early professional football in the Southern League. They were later elected to the Football League in 1920. Between 1979 and 1983, they played in the First Division, and reached the 1983 FA Cup final, losing to Manchester United after a replay. They were relegated from the First Division in the same season. In 1990, the club officially adopted the women's team ahead of the launch of the Albion in the Community scheme, and the restructuring of women's football which the club became a founding member of in 1991/92.

By the late 1990s, Brighton were in the fourth tier of English football and having financial problems. After narrowly avoiding relegation from the Football League to the Conference in 1997, a boardroom takeover saved the club from liquidation. Successive promotions in 2001 and 2002 brought Brighton back to the second tier, and in 2011, the club moved into the Falmer Stadium after 14 years without a permanent home ground. In the 2016–17 season, Brighton finished second in the EFL Championship and were thus promoted to the Premier League, ending a 34-year absence from the top flight. In the 2022–23 season, Brighton finished sixth in the Premier League, their highest top flight finish ever, and qualified for the UEFA Europa League; their first participation in European club football.

Brighton are nicknamed the Seagulls and have played in blue-and-white striped shirts for most of their history. The club's fiercest and longest-standing rivalry is with Crystal Palace, which emerged in the 1970s for competitive reasons.

== History ==
=== Formation and early years (1901–1972) ===
Brighton & Hove Albion F.C. were founded in 1901 and 19 years later, in 1920, they were elected to the Football League's new Third Division – having previously been members of the Southern League. In the Southern League they won their only national honour to date, the FA Charity Shield, which at that time was contested by the champions of the Southern League, and the Football League, by defeating Football League champions Aston Villa in 1910. Following their switch to the regionalised Third Division South in 1921, they remained in this division until the 1957–1958 season, when they won the title, securing promotion to the Second Division at the same time as the regionalised North and South divisions merged into a national Third and Fourth Division for the 1958–1959 season. Albion retained their second tier status until relegation in 1962, suffering a successive relegation in 1963 and slipping into the Fourth Division for the first time. They won the Fourth Division title in 1964–1965 and remained in the Third Division until 1972 when as runners up they secured promotion back to the Second Division.

=== Mike Bamber years (1972–1987) ===
Mike Bamber was the chairman of Brighton from October 1972 until 1983. He famously brought Brian Clough to the club in 1973 and later appointed former England player Alan Mullery as manager. Brighton's life as a Football League club had brought little in the way of success and headlines until 1979, when, under Mullery's management, they were promoted to the First Division as Second Division runners-up. The 1982/83 season saw an inconsistent start for the club, with victories over Arsenal and Manchester United mixed in with heavy defeats. Manager Mike Bailey eventually lost his job at the start of December 1982. Jimmy Melia took over as manager, but was unable to turn the situation around and Brighton, after four seasons in the top flight, were relegated in 1983, finishing in last place.

Despite their relegation, that season Brighton reached their first FA Cup final and drew 2–2 with Manchester United in the first match. Brighton's goals were scored by Gordon Smith and Gary Stevens. The final featured an infamous "miss" by Gordon Smith with the last kick of the game in extra time, prompting the BBC commentator Peter Jones to utter the well-known phrase "...and Smith must score". Smith's kick was saved by the Manchester United goalkeeper, Gary Bailey. In the replay, Manchester United won 4–0.

=== Relegation, last years, and saved by Knight (1987–1997) ===
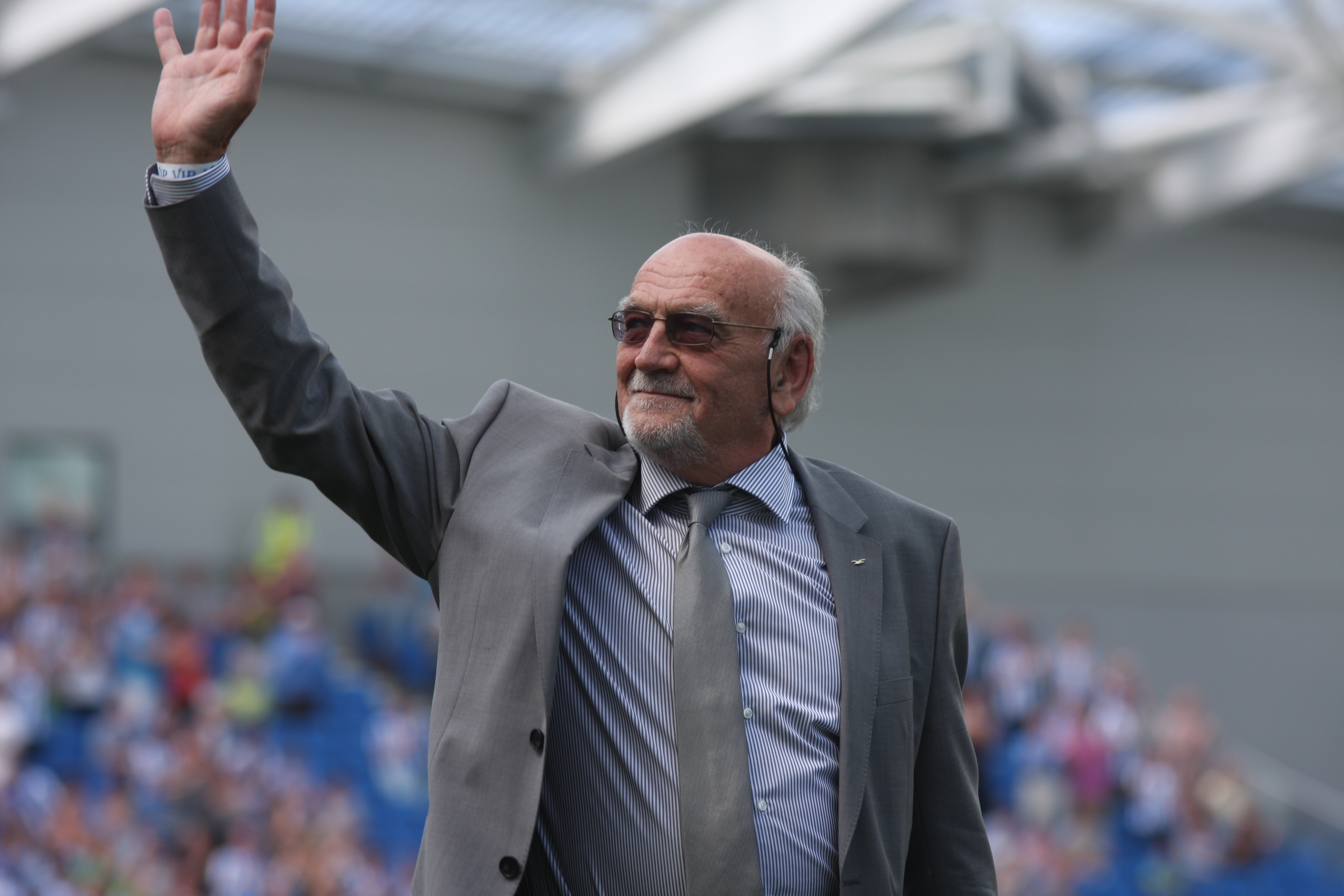
Former Brighton chairman Dick Knight, who ultimately saved the club

After four seasons, relegation to Division Three came in 1987, but the Albion were promoted back the next season. In 1991 they lost the play-off final at Wembley to Notts County 3–1, only to be relegated the next season to the newly named Division Two. In 1996 further relegation came to Division Three. The club's financial situation was becoming increasingly precarious, and the club's directors decided that the Goldstone Ground would have to be sold to pay off some of the club's large debts. Manager Jimmy Case was sacked, after a very poor start to the 1996–97 season left Brighton at the bottom of the league by a considerable margin. The club's directors appointed Steve Gritt, the former joint manager of Charlton Athletic, as manager—Gritt was relatively unknown. Brighton's league performance steadily improved under Gritt, although their improving chances of survival were put under further threat by a two-point deduction by the Football Association, imposed as punishment for a pitch invasion by fans who were protesting against the sale of the Goldstone ground. A lifelong fan named Dick Knight took control of the club in 1997 having led the fan pressure to oust the previous board following their sale of the club's Goldstone Ground to property developers.

By the last day of the season, after being 13 points adrift at one stage, they had risen from the bottom of the table and had to play the team directly below them, Hereford United, to avoid relegation from the league. If Brighton won or drew, they would be safe. Brighton defender Kerry Mayo scored an own goal in the first half, and it appeared that Brighton's 77-year league career was over. But a late goal from Robbie Reinelt ensured that Brighton retained their league status, based on number of goals scored (despite Hereford having a better goal difference as, in the Football League at the time, goals scored took precedence), and Hereford's 25-year league run was instead over.

=== Withdean era and Bloom takeover (1997–2011) ===
The sale of the Goldstone Ground went through in 1997, leading to Brighton having to play some 70 miles away at Gillingham's Priestfield stadium for two seasons. Micky Adams was appointed Brighton's manager in 1999. For the start of the 1999–2000 season, the Seagulls secured a lease to play home games at Withdean Stadium, a converted athletics track in Brighton owned by the local council.

2000–01 was Brighton's first successful season in 13 years. They were crowned champions of Division Three and promoted to Division Two. Adams left in October 2001 to work as Dave Bassett's assistant at Leicester, being replaced by former Leicester manager Peter Taylor. The transition was a plus point for Brighton, who maintained their good form and ended the season as Division Two champions, winning a second successive promotion. Just five years after almost succumbing to the double threat of losing their Football League status and going out of business, Brighton were one division away from the Premier League.

In May 2009, Knight was replaced as chairman at Brighton by Tony Bloom, who successfully secured £93 million funding for the new Falmer Stadium and 75% shareholding at the club.

Brighton's final season at Withdean was 2010–11, in which they won League One under the management of Gus Poyet. The following season, Brighton changed their crest to a design similar to the crest used from the 1970s to the 1990s. This was to reflect on the club returning home after not having a stadium since 1997.

=== Move to new stadium and promotion under Hughton (2011–2017) ===
The Falmer Stadium hosted its first league match on the opening day of the 2011–12 season against Doncaster Rovers, who were the last opposition to play at the Goldstone in 1997. The game finished 2–1 to Brighton. The 2012–13 season saw Brighton finish fourth and lose in the play-off semi-finals to Crystal Palace. Poyet was suspended as manager following controversial comments made in his post-match interview, and was later sacked and replaced by Óscar García.

On the final day of the 2013–14 season, Brighton beat Nottingham Forest 2–1 with a last-minute winner from Leonardo Ulloa to secure a sixth-place finish. After losing to Derby County in the playoff semi-final, García resigned. Sami Hyypiä was appointed manager for the 2014–15 season but resigned after just four months due to a poor run of results, replaced by Chris Hughton. In the following campaign, Brighton challenged for promotion again, buoyed by a 21-game unbeaten run from the opening day to 19 December. On the final day of the season, Brighton travelled to Middlesbrough needing a win to secure promotion to the Premier League, but a 1–1 draw meant third and a play-off place, where defeat to Sheffield Wednesday was Brighton's third playoff semi-final defeat in four seasons. Midfielder Beram Kayal, who joined from Celtic in January 2015, was voted the club’s Player of the Season for 2015–16 and contributed to Brighton’s promotion push and subsequent Premier League survival campaigns. Kayal and striker Tomer Hemed, an Arab-Israeli and Jewish-Israeli respectively, represented Brighton at the London launch of Kick It Out Israel’s anti-racism and coexistence project in 2017, which was supported by chairman Tony Bloom.

Brighton started 2016–17 with an 18-match unbeaten run, taking them to the top of the league for much of December and January. They remained in the automatic-promotion positions for most of the rest of the season, and clinched promotion to the Premier League after a 2–1 win against Wigan Athletic at home on 17 April 2017.

=== Back in the top division, and in European competitions (2017–present) ===
Brighton's first season in the Premier League was largely successful, with the club rising into the top half several times in the season. After being one point above the relegation zone in January, victories over Arsenal and Manchester United in the final months of the campaign helped secure a 15th place finish.

The club endured a difficult second season in the top division, narrowly avoiding relegation with a 17th-place finish. In the FA Cup, Brighton reached the semi-finals for the first time since 1983, losing 1–0 to Manchester City. Hughton was sacked following the end of the season due to the poor run of results.

Following Hughton's sacking, Swansea City manager Graham Potter was appointed as the new head coach on a four-year contract. Potter extended his contract by two more years in November 2019. From March to June 2020, the season was suspended due to the COVID-19 pandemic. Brighton finished 15th and 16th in Potter's first two seasons, securing a historic fifth season in the Premier League in May 2021 that ensured their current spell in the top flight exceeded their previous run from 1979 to 1983.

The club's 2021–22 season saw a ninth-place finish in the Premier League, the highest Brighton had ever finished in English top flight football, with a record tally of 51 points. In September 2022, Potter left the club to become head coach of Chelsea, following the dismissal of Thomas Tuchel.

On 18 September 2022, Brighton announced Roberto De Zerbi as the club's new head coach. The league season was paused for the 2022 FIFA World Cup, in which Brighton midfielder Alexis Mac Allister played an important role in Argentina's victory in the tournament including starting and assisting in the final. Brighton reached their second FA Cup semi-final in four seasons, losing on penalties to Manchester United following a 0–0 draw. On 21 May 2023, Brighton qualified for European football for the first time in their history with a 3–1 victory over Southampton. Three days later, after a 1–1 draw with Manchester City, Brighton secured qualification for the group stage of the 2023–24 UEFA Europa League. Brighton finished the season in sixth-place with a record tally of 62 points.

On 14 December 2023, Brighton topped their UEFA Europa League group, qualifying for the round of 16 after defeating Marseille 1–0, topping the so called "Group of Death". However, Brighton would be eliminated in the round of 16 by Roma in a 4–1 aggregate loss on 14 March 2024, after failing to overcome a 0-4 deficit sustained in the first leg away in Rome. On 18 May 2024, Brighton and De Zerbi mutually agreed to end his contract at the end of the 2023–24 season as Brighton fell to 11th on the final day of the season with 48 points, leapfrogged by their arch rivals Crystal Palace on goal difference after being ahead all season.

In June 2024, De Zerbi was replaced by Fabian Hürzeler who became the youngest permanent manager in Premier League history at 31 years old. Hürzeler had been manager of FC St. Pauli, where he led the team to promotion back to the top tier of German football after a 13-year absence. His first official match in charge of Brighton was on August 17, 2024, against Everton. Brighton won the match 3–0. Hürzeler won the Premier League Manager of the Month award for August 2024 after an unbeaten start to the season. Brighton finished the 2024–25 season in eighth place.

== Stadium ==
=== Goldstone Ground ===
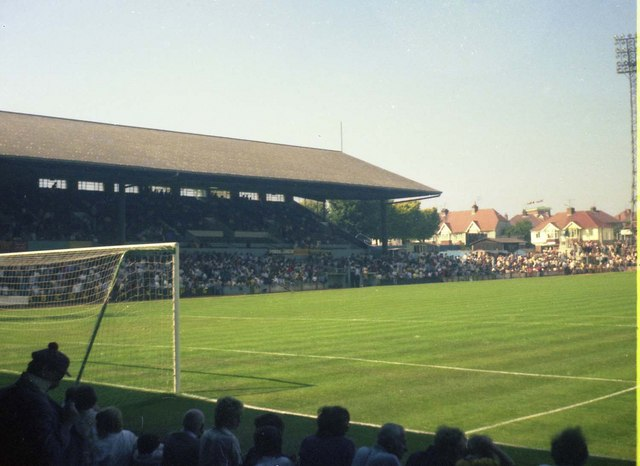
Goldstone Ground (1902–1997)

For 95 years Brighton and Hove Albion were located at the Goldstone Ground in Hove, until the board of directors decided to sell the stadium. The sale, implemented by majority shareholder Bill Archer and his chief executive David Bellotti, proved controversial, and the move provoked widespread protests against the board. The club received little if any money from this sale.

In their last season at the Goldstone, 1996–97, the Seagulls were in danger of relegation from the Football League. They won their final game at the Goldstone against Doncaster Rovers, setting up a winner-takes-all relegation game at Hereford United, who were level on points with the Seagulls. Brighton drew 1–1, and Hereford were relegated to the Football Conference on goals scored.

=== Withdean Stadium ===
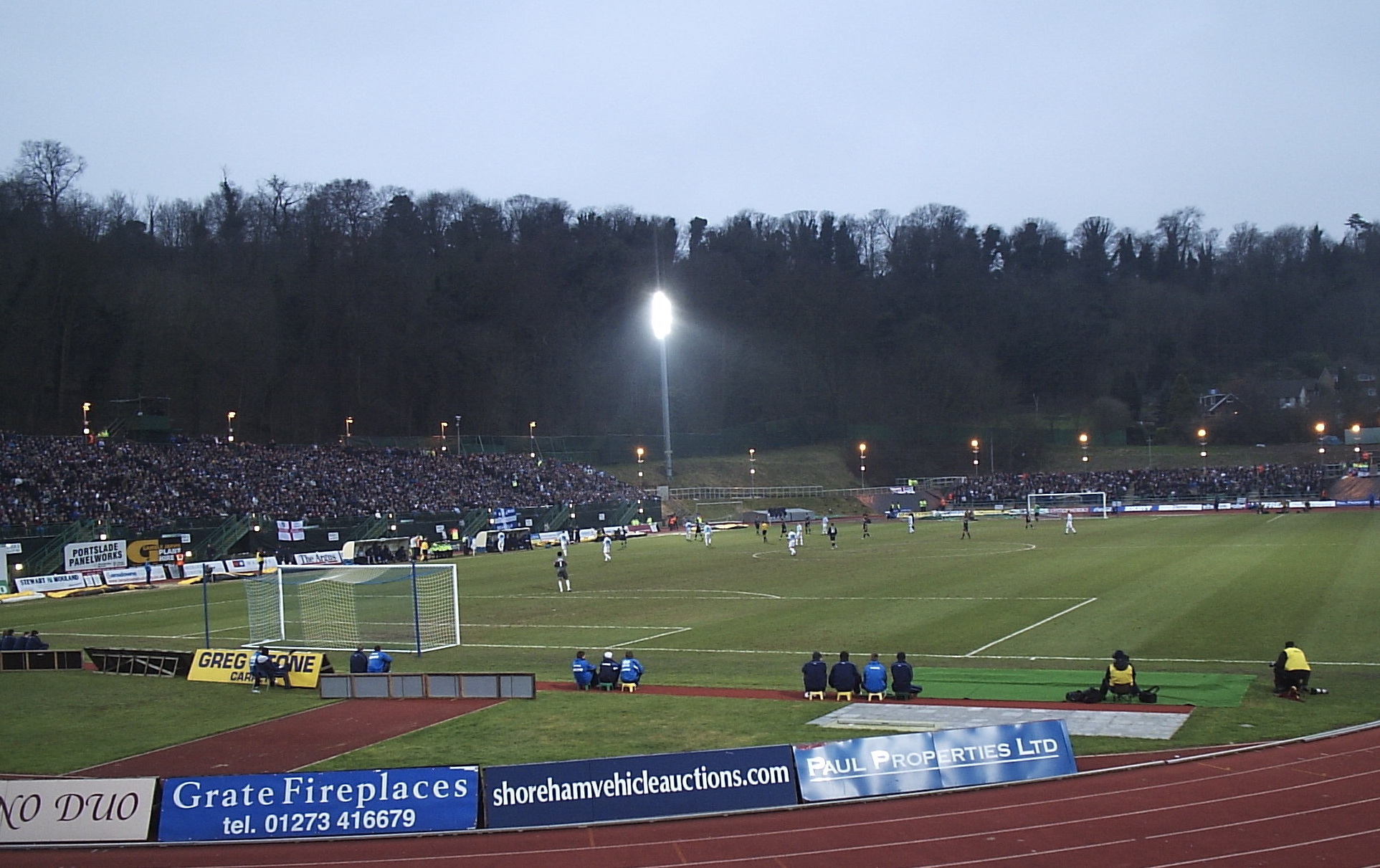
Withdean Stadium, Brighton's home from 1999 to 2011

For two years, from 1997 to 1999, the club shared Priestfield Stadium, the ground of Gillingham, before returning to Brighton to play at Withdean Stadium. This is not predominantly a football ground, having been used for athletics throughout most of its history, and previously as a zoo.

Because of the cost of the public enquiry into planning permission for a new stadium, rent on Withdean Stadium, fees paid to use Gillingham's Priestfield Stadium, and a general running deficit due to the low ticket sales inherent with a small ground, the club had an accumulated deficit of £9.5 million in 2004. The board of directors paid £7 million of this; the other £2.5 million had to be raised from the operations of the club. To achieve this, a fundraising appeal known as the Alive and Kicking Fund was started, with everything from nude Christmas Cards featuring the players to a CD single being released to raise cash. On 9 January 2005 this fundraising single 'Tom Hark' went straight in at number 17 in the UK chart, gaining national airplay on BBC Radio 1.

=== Falmer Stadium ===
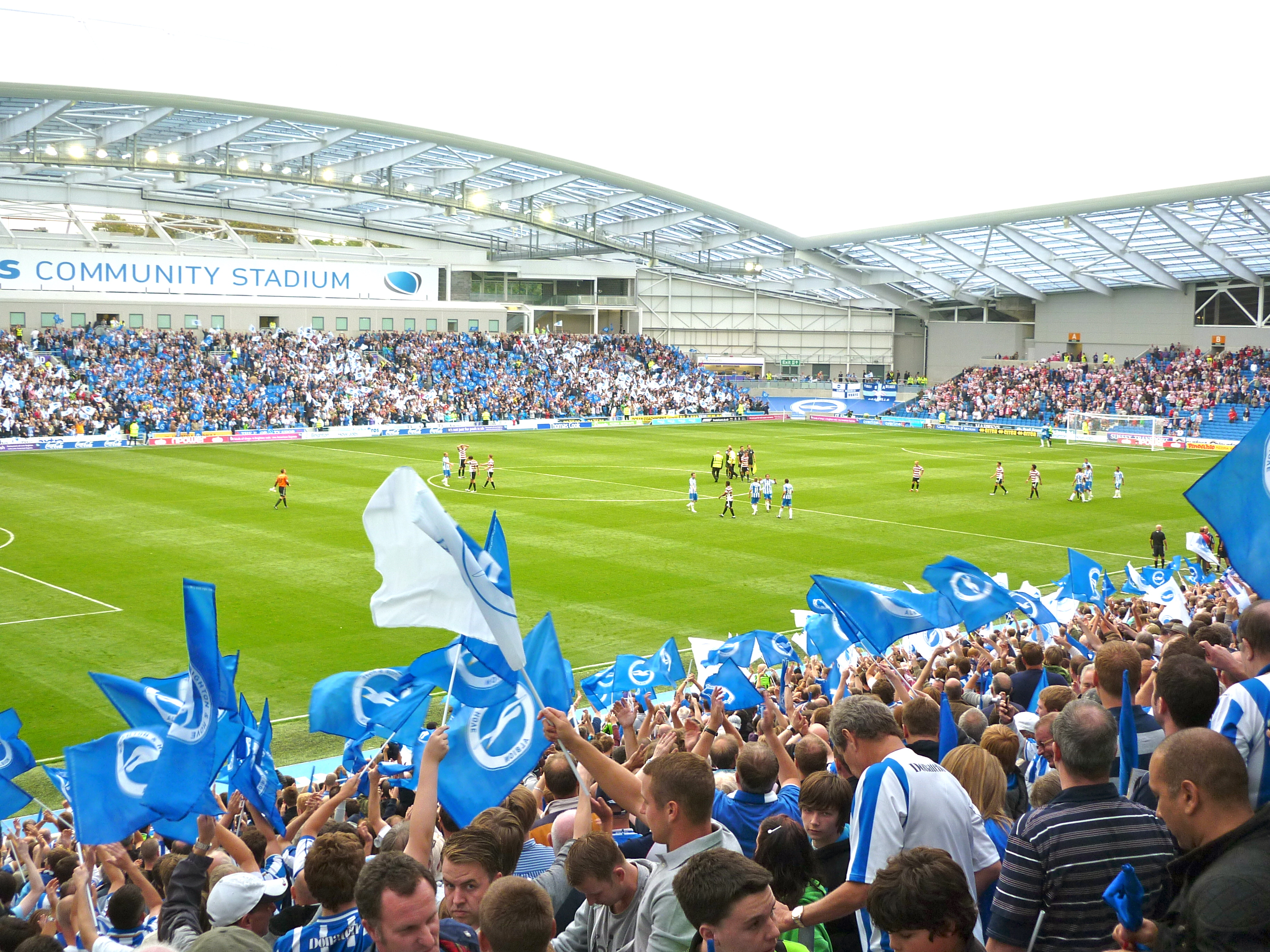
Brighton fans at Falmer Stadium during the first league game at the stadium against Doncaster Rovers

The club's home ground is Falmer Stadium, located in Village Way, Brighton.

On 28 October 2005, the Office of the Deputy Prime Minister announced that the application for Falmer had been successful. Lewes District Council contested John Prescott's decision to approve planning permission for Falmer, forcing a judicial review. This was based on a minor error in Prescott's original approval which neglected to state that some car parking for the stadium is in the Lewes district as opposed to the Brighton & Hove unitary authority. This caused further delay. Once the judicial review ruled in favour of the stadium, Lewes District Council said that it would not launch any further appeals.

Building of Falmer Stadium started in December 2008. On 31 May 2011 the club officially completed the handover and was given the keys to the stadium with an initial capacity of 22,374 seats, signifying the end of 14 years without a designated home. During January 2012, the club submitted an application to Brighton and Hove City council to increase the stadium capacity by a further 8,000 seats as well as to add additional corporate boxes, new television facilities and a luxury suite. This was granted unanimously by Brighton & Hove City Council's planning committee on 25 April 2012. The stadium was then expanded to 27,250 for the start of the 2012–13 season and then further to 27,750 during December 2012 before reaching 30,750 during May 2013.

In 2020, the club submitted plans to expand the stadium from 30,750 seats to 32,500 including additional hospitality. In 2021, the stadium was expanded to 31,800 with additional works yet to be done.

In April 2026, the club announced plans to a new stadium for their women’s team, which will be able to house 10,000 fans. It will be the first purpose-built stadium for a women’s football team in the UK and Europe. The ground will be open in time for the 2030/31 season.

== Colours and kits ==
For most of Brighton's history they have played in blue and white shirts, usually striped, with different combinations of white and blue shorts and socks, though this changed to all white briefly in the 1970s and again to plain royal blue in the early 1980s.

=== Kit manufacturers and sponsors ===
Since 2014, the club's kit has been manufactured by Nike. Previous manufacturers include Bukta (1971–74, 1977–80), Admiral (1974–75, 1994–97), Umbro (1975–77), Adidas (1980–87), Spall (1987–89), Sports Express (1989–91), Ribero (1991–94), Superleague (1997–99), and Erreà (1999–2014). Their current shirt sponsors are American Express. Previous sponsors have included British Caledonian Airways (1980–83), Phoenix Brewery (1983–86), NOBO (1986–91), TSB Bank (1991–93), Sandtex (1993–98), Donatello (1998–99), Skint Records (1999–2008), IT First (2008–11), and BrightonandHoveJobs.com (2011–13). Their current sleeve sponsors are Experience Kissimmee. Previous sleeve sponsors include JD Sports, and Snickers UK.

Year	Kit manufacturer	Shirt sponsor (front)	Shirt sponsor (sleeve)	Shirt sponsor (back)	Shorts sponsor
1971–1974	Bukta	No sponsor	No sponsor	No sponsor	No sponsor
1974–1975	Admiral	No sponsor	No sponsor	No sponsor	No sponsor
1975–1977	Umbro	No sponsor	No sponsor	No sponsor	No sponsor
1977–1980	Bukta	No sponsor	No sponsor	No sponsor	No sponsor
1980–1983	Adidas	British Caledonian	No sponsor	No sponsor	No sponsor
1983–1986	Adidas	Phoenix Brewery	No sponsor	No sponsor	No sponsor
1986–1987	Adidas	NOBO	No sponsor	No sponsor	No sponsor
1987–1989	Spall	NOBO	No sponsor	No sponsor	No sponsor
1989–1991	Sports Express	NOBO	No sponsor	No sponsor	No sponsor
1991–1993	Ribero	TSB Bank	No sponsor	No sponsor	No sponsor
1993–1994	Ribero	Sandtex	No sponsor	No sponsor	No sponsor
1994–1997	Admiral	Sandtex	No sponsor	No sponsor	No sponsor
1997–1998	Superleague	Sandtex	No sponsor	No sponsor	No sponsor
1998–1999	Superleague	Donatello Restaurant	No sponsor	No sponsor	No sponsor
1999–2004	Erreà	Skint Records	No sponsor	No sponsor	No sponsor
2004–2005	Erreà	Skint Records	No sponsor	Alive and Kicking Fund	No sponsor
2005–2008	Erreà	Skint Records	No sponsor	Donatello Restaurant	Donatello Restaurant
2008–2011	Erreà	IT First	No sponsor	Donatello Restaurant	Donatello Restaurant
2011–2013	Erreà	BrightonandHoveJobs.com	No sponsor	Donatello Restaurant	Donatello Restaurant
2013–2014	Erreà	American Express	No sponsor	American Express	American Express
2014–2017	Nike	American Express	No sponsor	American Express	American Express
2017–2020	Nike	American Express	JD Sports	No sponsor	No sponsor
2020–2024	Nike	American Express	Snickers UK	No sponsor	No sponsor
2024–	Nike	American Express	Experience Kissimmee	No sponsor	No sponsor

== Rivalries ==
Even though the two clubs are almost 40 mi (64 km) apart, Crystal Palace are Brighton's main rival, dating back to the 1970s and hostility between managers Alan Mullery and Terry Venables, who took charge of Brighton and Palace respectively in 1976 ahead of a close season in the Third Division which saw the two teams vying with Mansfield Town. The season finished with both Palace and Brighton beaten to the title by Mansfield; however both sides were promoted and the hostility between the two managers had forged an intense rivalry between both teams. This continued into the following season in the Second Division as Brighton, who had finished their season at the top, fell into second after Palace won a previously postponed game against Burnley the following weekend to beat Brighton to the title by one point. In addition, the A23 road runs directly between Brighton and Croydon, where Palace's Selhurst Park stadium is based. This has led to the media labelling the rivalry as both the A23 and M23 derby, although fans of both clubs do not use this term.

Situated in East Sussex, Brighton find themselves isolated from most other teams, leaving them without an established local derby. Matches against fellow south coast outfits Southampton and Portsmouth are occasionally labelled as local derbies by the media, but most fans of either team do not consider the other to be their rivals due to the over 60 mi (97 km) distance between the clubs, and the already well-established rivalry between Southampton and Portsmouth.

== Players ==
=== First-team squad ===
As of 3 September 2026

Note: Flags indicate national team as defined under FIFA eligibility rules; some limited exceptions apply. Players may hold more than one non-FIFA nationality.

No.	Pos.	Nation	Player
1	GK	NED	Bart Verbruggen
3	DF	ALG	Jaouen Hadjam
4	DF	NED	Pascal Struijk
5	DF	ENG	Lewis Dunk (captain)
7	MF	JPN	Kaoru Mitoma
8	MF	ENG	Jack Hinshelwood
9	FW	GRE	Stefanos Tzimas
10	FW	FRA	Georginio Rutter
11	MF	GAM	Yankuba Minteh
12	FW	CAN	Promise David (on loan from Union Saint-Gilloise)
13	MF	GER	Pascal Groß (vice-captain)
14	MF	ESP	Chema Andrés
15	MF	GHA	Ibrahim Osman
19	FW	GRE	Charalampos Kostoulas
20	DF	POR	Costinha

No.	Pos.	Nation	Player
21	DF	FRA	Olivier Boscagli
23	GK	ENG	Jason Steele
24	DF	TUR	Ferdi Kadıoğlu
25	MF	PAR	Diego Gómez
26	MF	SWE	Yasin Ayari
27	DF	NED	Mats Wieffer
28	FW	IRL	Evan Ferguson
29	DF	BEL	Maxim De Cuyper
30	DF	AUT	Michael Svoboda
33	MF	DEN	Matt O'Riley
35	MF	CIV	Malick Yalcouyé
36	MF	NGR	Zadok Yohanna
38	GK	CAN	Tom McGill
39	MF	NGR	Femi Azeez
44	DF	CRO	Luka Vušković

=== Out on loan ===
Note: Flags indicate national team as defined under FIFA eligibility rules; some limited exceptions apply. Players may hold more than one non-FIFA nationality.

No.	Pos.	Nation	Player
16	DF	IRL	Eiran Cashin (at Derby County until 30 June 2027)
22	MF	ENG	Amario Cozier-Duberry (at Middlesbrough until 30 June 2027)
—	MF	ARG	Facundo Buonanotte (at Elche until 30 June 2027)

No.	Pos.	Nation	Player
—	MF	GER	Brajan Gruda (at RB Leipzig until 30 June 2027)
—	MF	POR	Rodrigo Rêgo (at Castellón until 30 June 2027)
—	MF	ENG	Tommy Watson (at Leicester City until 30 June 2027)

=== Under 21s and academy ===
The Under-21s and Academy are the youth teams of Brighton & Hove Albion. The under-21 players play in the Premier League 2, the highest tier of under-21 team football in England. They also compete in the EFL Trophy, the Premier League Cup, the Premier League International Cup and the Sussex Senior Challenge Cup.

The academy teams culminate with the under-18's squad, who compete in the U18 Premier League Division South.

Academy players who have featured in a first-team matchday squad during the 2026–27 season.

Note: Flags indicate national team as defined under FIFA eligibility rules; some limited exceptions apply. Players may hold more than one non-FIFA nationality.

No.	Pos.	Nation	Player
41	DF	ENG	Freddie Simmonds
43	MF	ENG	Josh Robertson
49	MF	NGR	Nehemiah Oriola

No.	Pos.	Nation	Player
50	MF	MAS	Shane Nti
59	MF	EGY	Younes Ibrahim
61	GK	AUS	Steven Hall

== Managers ==
=== List ===
- (England) John Jackson 1901–1905
- (England) Frank Scott-Walford 1905–1908
- (England) Jack Robson 1908–1914
- (Ireland) Charlie Webb 1919–1947
- (England) Tommy Cook 1947
- (England) Don Welsh 1947–1951
- (England) Billy Lane 1951–1961
- (England) George Curtis 1961–1963
- (Scotland) Archie Macaulay 1963–1968
- (England) Freddie Goodwin 1968–1970
- (Republic of Ireland) Pat Saward 1970–1973
- (England) Brian Clough 1973–1974
- (England) Peter T. Taylor 1974–1976
- (England) Alan Mullery 1976–1981
- (England) Mike Bailey 1981–1982
- (England) Jimmy Melia 1982–1983
- (England) Chris Cattlin 1983–1986
- (England) Alan Mullery 1986–1987
- (England) Barry Lloyd 1987–1993
- (Republic of Ireland) Liam Brady 1993–1995
- (England) Jimmy Case 1995–1996
- (England) Steve Gritt 1996–1998
- (England) Brian Horton 1998–1999
- (England) Jeff Wood 1999
- (England) Micky Adams 1999–2001
- (England) Peter J. Taylor 2001–2002
- (England) Martin Hinshelwood 2002
- (England) Steve Coppell 2002–2003
- (Scotland) Mark McGhee 2003–2006
- (England) Dean Wilkins 2006–2008
- (England) Micky Adams 2008–2009
- (England) Russell Slade 2009
- (Uruguay) Gus Poyet 2009–2013
- (Spain) Óscar García 2013–2014
- (Finland) Sami Hyypiä 2014
- (Republic of Ireland) Chris Hughton 2014–2019
- (England) Graham Potter 2019–2022
- (Italy) Roberto De Zerbi 2022–2024
- (Germany) Fabian Hürzeler 2024–

== Management ==
First-Team Coaching Staff
Head Coach	(Germany) Fabian Hürzeler
Assistant Coaches	(Germany) Jonas Scheuermann (Germany) Daniel Niedzkowski
Goalkeeping Coach	(Netherlands) Jelle ten Rouwelaar
Set-Piece Coach	(Belgium) Yannick Euvrard
Performance Analysis Manager	(England) Calum Johnson
Goalkeeping Analyst	(Wales) Josh Morris
Head of Analyst and Data	(England) Eoin Bradford
Tactical Analysts	(Germany) Max Lesser (England) Jack Sheard
Recruitment
Head of Recruitment	Vacant
Loan Manager	(Scotland) Gordon Greer
Academy
Academy Manager	(England) Ian Buckman
Under-21s Head Coach	(England) Shannon Ruth
Under-18s Head Coach	(England) Carl Martin
Medical & Performance
Head of Performance	(England) Gary Walker
Performance Coach	(England) Dominic May
Physical Performance Manager	(England) Joshua Hook
Head of Player Development and High Performance	(New Zealand) Mike Anthony
Rehabilitation Coach	(England) Eamon Swift
Club Doctor	(England) Jim Moxon

Club Officials
Board
Chairman	Tony Bloom
Chief Executive & Deputy Chairman	Paul Barber
Finance Director	Lee Cooper
Chief Operating Officer	Paul Mullen
Head of People & Culture	Rose Read
Non-Executive Vice Chairman	Peter Godfrey
Non-Executive Directors	Ray Bloom; Paul Brown; Robert Comer; Adam Franks; Anna Jones; Michelle Walder Zoe Johnson
Senior Management Team
Chief Executive & Deputy Chairman	Paul Barber
Sporting Director	Mike Cave
Technical Director	Mike Cave
Chief Operating Officer	Paul Mullen
Head of Media & Communications	Paul Camillin
Finance Director	Lee Cooper
Head of Marketing	Anna Easthope
Head of Ticketing & Supporter Services	Jenny Gower
Chief Technology Officer	Mark Loch
Managing Director for Women & Girls	Zoe Johnson
Head of Safety & Security	Adrian Morris
Head of People & Culture	Rose Read
General Counsel	Lloyd Thomas
Head of Commercial	Russell Wood

== Honours ==
Brighton & Hove Albion's historic league position

League

- Second Division / Championship (level 2)
  - Runners-up: 1978–79, 2016–17
- Third Division South / Second Division / League One (level 3)
  - Winners: 1957–58, 2001–02, 2010–11
- Fourth Division / Third Division (level 4)
  - Winners: 1964–65, 2000–01
- Southern League
  - Winners: 1909–10

Cup

- FA Cup
  - Runners-up: 1982–83
- FA Charity Shield
  - Winners: 1910
- Sussex Senior Challenge Cup
  - Winners: 1942–43, 1987–88, 1991–92, 1993–94, 1994–95, 1999–00, 2003–04, 2006–07, 2007–08, 2009–10, 2010–11, 2012–13, 2016–17, 2017–18, 2021–22
- The Sussex Royal Ulster Rifles Charity Cup
  - Winners: 1959–60, 1960–61. (Note: shared with Chichester City in 1960–61)
