= 2021–22 Rochdale A.F.C. season =

English football club season

Rochdale
2021–22 season
- Chairman: Andrew Kelly
- Manager: Robbie Stockdale
- Stadium: Spotland
- League Two: 18th
- FA Cup: Second round
- EFL Cup: Third round
- EFL Trophy: Group stage
- Top goalscorer: League: Jake Beesley (9); All: Jake Beesley (12)
| Home colours | Away colours | Third colours |

The 2021–22 season was Rochdale A.F.C.'s 115th in existence and first season back in League Two since the 2013–14 season following relegation last season. Along with the league, the club also competed in the FA Cup, the EFL Cup and the EFL Trophy. The season covers the period from 1 July 2021 to 30 June 2022.

== Manager changes ==
On 30 June, Dale announced they reluctantly agreed to release manager Brian Barry-Murphy from his contract.

Robbie Stockdale was appointed as the new manager on July 10, signing a two-year contract with the club.

== First-team squad ==
=== Statistics ===
As of 7 May 2022

| No. | Pos | Nat | Player | Total | | League One | | F.A. Cup | | League Cup | | League Trophy | |
| No. | Pos | Nat | Player | Apps | Goals | Apps | Goals | Apps | Goals | Apps | Goals | Apps | Goals |
|---|---|---|---|---|---|---|---|---|---|---|---|---|---|
| 1 | GK | (England) ENG | Jay Lynch | 31 | 0 | 25+0 | 0 | 3+0 | 0 | 1+0 | 0 | 2+0 | 0 |
| 2 | DF | (England) ENG | Corey O'Keeffe | 50 | 5 | 38+4 | 2 | 3+0 | 1 | 2+0 | 0 | 3+0 | 2 |
| 3 | DF | (Republic of Ireland) IRL | Aidy White | 17 | 0 | 7+5 | 0 | 1+1 | 0 | 0+0 | 0 | 3+0 | 0 |
| 4 | DF | (Scotland) SCO | Jimmy McNulty | 14 | 0 | 9+3 | 0 | 0+0 | 0 | 0+0 | 0 | 2+0 | 0 |
| 5 | DF | (England) ENG | Max Taylor | 29 | 3 | 19+3 | 3 | 2+0 | 0 | 2+0 | 0 | 3+0 | 0 |
| 6 | DF | (Republic of Ireland) IRL | Eoghan O'Connell | 50 | 1 | 45+0 | 1 | 3+0 | 0 | 2+0 | 0 | 0+0 | 0 |
| 7 | MF | (Northern Ireland) NIR | Stephen Dooley | 44 | 0 | 30+8 | 0 | 1+2 | 0 | 2+0 | 0 | 1+0 | 0 |
| ~~8~~ | MF | (England) ENG | Aaron Morley | 26 | 2 | 19+2 | 1 | 3+0 | 1 | 2+0 | 0 | 0+0 | 0 |
| 8 | MF | (England) ENG | Jimmy Ball | 11 | 3 | 11+0 | 3 | 0+0 | 0 | 0+0 | 0 | 0+0 | 0 |
| ~~9~~ | FW | (England) ENG | Jake Beesley | 26 | 12 | 21+0 | 9 | 3+0 | 1 | 2+0 | 2 | 0+0 | 0 |
| 9 | FW | (England) ENG | Luke Charman | 19 | 2 | 10+9 | 2 | 0+0 | 0 | 0+0 | 0 | 0+0 | 0 |
| 10 | FW | (England) ENG | Alex Newby | 39 | 6 | 27+9 | 6 | 1+0 | 0 | 0+1 | 0 | 1+0 | 0 |
| 11 | FW | (Republic of Ireland) IRL | Conor Grant | 38 | 4 | 21+12 | 4 | 1+1 | 0 | 0+0 | 0 | 3+0 | 0 |
| 12 | DF | (England) ENG | Jeriel Dorsett | 44 | 0 | 35+1 | 0 | 3+0 | 0 | 2+0 | 0 | 1+2 | 0 |
| 13 | MF | (Republic of Ireland) IRL | Jimmy Keohane | 32 | 2 | 25+2 | 2 | 1+0 | 0 | 2+0 | 0 | 1+1 | 0 |
| 14 | MF | (England) ENG | George Broadbent | 27 | 1 | 13+8 | 1 | 0+2 | 0 | 0+1 | 0 | 3+0 | 0 |
| 15 | DF | (England) ENG | Sam Graham | 14 | 0 | 11+1 | 0 | 1+0 | 0 | 0+0 | 0 | 1+0 | 0 |
| 16 | MF | (England) ENG | Matt Done | 28 | 1 | 13+12 | 1 | 0+1 | 0 | 0+0 | 0 | 2+0 | 0 |
| 17 | DF | (England) ENG | Paul Downing | 10 | 0 | 10+0 | 0 | 0+0 | 0 | 0+0 | 0 | 0+0 | 0 |
| 18 | MF | (England) ENG | Abraham Odoh | 38 | 3 | 17+15 | 3 | 2+1 | 0 | 2+0 | 0 | 0+1 | 0 |
| 19 | FW | (England) ENG | Josh Andrews | 22 | 5 | 7+10 | 3 | 2+0 | 1 | 0+2 | 0 | 1+0 | 1 |
| 20 | FW | (England) ENG | Danny Cashman | 29 | 3 | 9+14 | 2 | 0+1 | 0 | 2+0 | 1 | 2+1 | 0 |
| 21 | GK | (England) ENG | Jake Eastwood | 2 | 0 | 2+0 | 0 | 0+0 | 0 | 0+0 | 0 | 0+0 | 0 |
| 23 | MF | (England) ENG | Liam Kelly | 36 | 6 | 24+6 | 5 | 3+0 | 0 | 0+1 | 0 | 2+0 | 1 |
| 24 | MF | (England) ENG | Ethan Brierley | 5 | 0 | 2+0 | 0 | 0+0 | 0 | 0+1 | 0 | 0+2 | 0 |
| 25 | DF | (England) ENG | Joe Dunne | 1 | 0 | 0+0 | 0 | 0+0 | 0 | 0+0 | 0 | 1+0 | 0 |
| 26 | DF | (England) ENG | Max Clark | 23 | 1 | 22+1 | 1 | 0+0 | 0 | 0+0 | 0 | 0+0 | 0 |
| 29 | MF | (England) ENG | Tahvon Campbell | 13 | 2 | 13+0 | 2 | 0+0 | 0 | 0+0 | 0 | 0+0 | 0 |
| 33 | GK | (England) ENG | Joel Coleman | 21 | 0 | 19+0 | 0 | 0+0 | 0 | 1+0 | 0 | 1+0 | 0 |

=== Goals record ===
As of 7 May 2022

| Rank | No. | Nat. | Po. | Name | League Two | FA Cup | League Cup | League Trophy | Total |
|---|---|---|---|---|---|---|---|---|---|
| 1 | 9 | (England) | FW | Jake Beesley | 9 | 1 | 2 | 0 | 12 |
| 2 | 10 | (England) | FW | Alex Newby | 6 | 0 | 0 | 0 | 6 |
| 2 | 23 | (England) | MF | Liam Kelly | 5 | 0 | 0 | 1 | 6 |
| 4 | 19 | (England) | FW | Josh Andrews | 3 | 1 | 0 | 1 | 5 |
| 4 | 2 | (England) | DF | Corey O'Keeffe | 2 | 1 | 0 | 2 | 5 |
| 6 | 11 | (Republic of Ireland) | FW | Conor Grant | 4 | 0 | 0 | 0 | 4 |
| 7 | 20 | (England) | FW | Danny Cashman | 2 | 0 | 1 | 0 | 3 |
| 7 | 5 | (England) | DF | Max Taylor | 3 | 0 | 0 | 0 | 3 |
| 7 | 8 | (England) | MF | Jimmy Ball | 3 | 0 | 0 | 0 | 3 |
| 7 | 18 | (England) | MF | Abraham Odoh | 3 | 0 | 0 | 0 | 3 |
| 11 | 8 | (England) | MF | Aaron Morley | 1 | 1 | 0 | 0 | 2 |
| 11 | 29 | (England) | MF | Tahvon Campbell | 2 | 0 | 0 | 0 | 2 |
| 11 | 13 | (Republic of Ireland) | MF | Jimmy Keohane | 2 | 0 | 0 | 0 | 2 |
| 11 | 9 | (England) | FW | Luke Charman | 2 | 0 | 0 | 0 | 2 |
| 15 | 14 | (England) | MF | George Broadbent | 1 | 0 | 0 | 0 | 1 |
| 15 | 26 | (England) | DF | Max Clark | 1 | 0 | 0 | 0 | 1 |
| 15 | 6 | (Republic of Ireland) | DF | Eoghan O'Connell | 1 | 0 | 0 | 0 | 1 |
| 15 | 16 | (England) | MF | Matt Done | 1 | 0 | 0 | 0 | 1 |
| Total | | | | | 51 | 4 | 3 | 4 | 62 |

=== Disciplinary record ===
As of 30 April 2022

| Rank | No. | Nat. | Po. | Name | League Two | | | FA Cup | | | League Cup | | | League Trophy | | | Total | | |
| Rank | No. | Nat. | Po. | Name | Yellow card | (yellow card) (yellow-red card) | Red card | Yellow card | (yellow card) (yellow-red card) | Red card | Yellow card | (yellow card) (yellow-red card) | Red card | Yellow card | (yellow card) (yellow-red card) | Red card | Yellow card | (yellow card) (yellow-red card) | Red card |
|---|---|---|---|---|---|---|---|---|---|---|---|---|---|---|---|---|---|---|---|
| 1 | 6 | (Republic of Ireland) | DF | Eoghan O'Connell | 10 | 0 | 0 | 0 | 0 | 0 | 1 | 0 | 0 | 0 | 0 | 0 | 11 | 0 | 0 |
| 2 | 2 | (England) | DF | Corey O'Keeffe | 6 | 0 | 0 | 1 | 0 | 0 | 1 | 0 | 0 | 0 | 0 | 0 | 8 | 0 | 0 |
| 3 | 12 | (England) | DF | Jeriel Dorsett | 5 | 0 | 0 | 1 | 0 | 0 | 0 | 0 | 0 | 0 | 0 | 0 | 6 | 0 | 0 |
| 4 | 18 | (England) | MF | Abraham Odoh | 3 | 0 | 0 | 0 | 0 | 0 | 1 | 0 | 0 | 0 | 0 | 0 | 4 | 0 | 0 |
| 5 | 9 | (England) | FW | Jake Beesley | 3 | 0 | 0 | 0 | 0 | 0 | 0 | 0 | 0 | 0 | 0 | 0 | 3 | 0 | 0 |
| 5 | 14 | (England) | MF | George Broadbent | 3 | 0 | 0 | 0 | 0 | 0 | 0 | 0 | 0 | 0 | 0 | 0 | 3 | 0 | 0 |
| 5 | 23 | (England) | MF | Liam Kelly | 2 | 0 | 0 | 0 | 0 | 0 | 0 | 0 | 0 | 1 | 0 | 0 | 3 | 0 | 0 |
| 5 | 5 | (England) | DF | Max Taylor | 2 | 0 | 0 | 0 | 0 | 0 | 0 | 0 | 0 | 1 | 0 | 0 | 3 | 0 | 0 |
| 9 | 20 | (England) | FW | Danny Cashman | 1 | 0 | 0 | 0 | 0 | 0 | 0 | 0 | 0 | 1 | 0 | 0 | 2 | 0 | 0 |
| 9 | 33 | (England) | GK | Joel Coleman | 2 | 0 | 0 | 0 | 0 | 0 | 0 | 0 | 0 | 0 | 0 | 0 | 2 | 0 | 0 |
| 9 | 29 | (England) | MF | Tahvon Campbell | 2 | 0 | 0 | 0 | 0 | 0 | 0 | 0 | 0 | 0 | 0 | 0 | 2 | 0 | 0 |
| 9 | 8 | (England) | MF | Jimmy Ball | 2 | 0 | 0 | 0 | 0 | 0 | 0 | 0 | 0 | 0 | 0 | 0 | 2 | 0 | 0 |
| 9 | 7 | (Northern Ireland) | MF | Stephen Dooley | 2 | 0 | 0 | 0 | 0 | 0 | 0 | 0 | 0 | 0 | 0 | 0 | 2 | 0 | 0 |
| 9 | 13 | (Republic of Ireland) | MF | Jimmy Keohane | 1 | 0 | 0 | 0 | 0 | 0 | 0 | 0 | 0 | 1 | 0 | 0 | 2 | 0 | 0 |
| 15 | 15 | (England) | DF | Sam Graham | 1 | 0 | 0 | 0 | 0 | 0 | 0 | 0 | 0 | 0 | 0 | 0 | 1 | 0 | 0 |
| 15 | 3 | (Republic of Ireland) | DF | Aidy White | 1 | 0 | 0 | 0 | 0 | 0 | 0 | 0 | 0 | 0 | 0 | 0 | 1 | 0 | 0 |
| 15 | 11 | (Republic of Ireland) | FW | Conor Grant | 1 | 0 | 0 | 0 | 0 | 0 | 0 | 0 | 0 | 0 | 0 | 0 | 1 | 0 | 0 |
| 15 | 17 | (England) | DF | Paul Downing | 1 | 0 | 0 | 0 | 0 | 0 | 0 | 0 | 0 | 0 | 0 | 0 | 1 | 0 | 0 |
| 15 | 1 | (England) | GK | Jay Lynch | 1 | 0 | 0 | 0 | 0 | 0 | 0 | 0 | 0 | 0 | 0 | 0 | 1 | 0 | 0 |
| 15 | 4 | (Scotland) | DF | Jimmy McNulty | 1 | 0 | 0 | 0 | 0 | 0 | 0 | 0 | 0 | 0 | 0 | 0 | 1 | 0 | 0 |
| 15 | 9 | (England) | FW | Luke Charman | 1 | 0 | 0 | 0 | 0 | 0 | 0 | 0 | 0 | 0 | 0 | 0 | 1 | 0 | 0 |
| Total | | | | | 51 | 0 | 0 | 2 | 0 | 0 | 3 | 0 | 0 | 4 | 0 | 0 | 60 | 0 | 0 |

== Pre-season friendlies ==
Rochdale announced they would play friendly matches against Luton Town, Barnsley, Fleetwood Town, Rotherham United, AFC Fylde and Stalybridge Celtic as part of their pre-season preparation.

| 10 July 2021 Friendly | Luton Town | 4–0 | Rochdale | Neutral venue |
| 15:00 BST | Adebayo 18' (pen.); Burke 45'; Cornick 54'; Jerome 65' | Report | | Attendance: 0 (Behind-closed-doors) |

| 14 July 2021 Friendly | Rochdale | 1–2 | Barnsley | Spotland |
| TBC BST | Morley 53' (pen.) | Report | Morris 12'; Kitching 19' | Stadium: Crown Oil Arena; Attendance: 0 (Behind-closed-doors) |

| 17 July 2021 Friendly | Rochdale | 3–3 | Fleetwood Town | Spotland |
| 15:00 BST | Dooley 8'; Beesley 60'; Holgate 66' (o.g.) | Report | Andrew 50'; Edmondson 83', 87' | Stadium: Crown Oil Arena |

| 20 July 2021 Friendly | Rochdale | 2–2 | Rotherham United | Spotland |
| 19:00 BST | Beesley 65' (pen.), 71' | Report | Ogbene 83'; Ihiekwe 90' | Stadium: Crown Oil Arena |

| 24 July 2021 Friendly | AFC Fylde | 0–1 | Rochdale | Medlar-with-Wesham |
| 15:00 BST | | Report | Beesley 35' | Stadium: Mill Farm |

| 30 July 2021 Friendly | Rochdale | 5–1 | Oldham Athletic | Spotland |
| 14:00 BST | Morley 49'; McNulty 55'; Hart 64' (o.g.); Beesley 66'; Done 76' | Report | Trialist 79' | Stadium: Crown Oil Arena; Attendance: 0 (Behind-closed-doors) |

| 3 August 2021 Friendly | Stalybridge Celtic | Cancelled | Rochdale XI | Stalybridge |
| TBC BST | | | | Stadium: Bower Fold |
Note: Match was cancelled due to limited player availability.

== Competitions ==
=== League Two ===
==== League table ====
| Pos | Team | Pld | W | D | L | GF | GA | GD | Pts |
|---|---|---|---|---|---|---|---|---|---|
| 15 | Colchester United | 46 | 14 | 13 | 19 | 48 | 60 | −12 | 55 |
| 16 | Walsall | 46 | 14 | 12 | 20 | 47 | 60 | −13 | 54 |
| 17 | Hartlepool United | 46 | 14 | 12 | 20 | 44 | 64 | −20 | 54 |
| 18 | Rochdale | 46 | 12 | 17 | 17 | 51 | 59 | −8 | 53 |
| 19 | Harrogate Town | 46 | 14 | 11 | 21 | 64 | 75 | −11 | 53 |
| 20 | Carlisle United | 46 | 14 | 11 | 21 | 39 | 62 | −23 | 53 |
| 21 | Stevenage | 46 | 11 | 14 | 21 | 45 | 68 | −23 | 47 |

Source: EFL Official Website
Rules for classification: 1) Points; 2) Goal difference; 3) Number of goals scored; 4) Head-to-head results; 5) Wins; 6) Away goals; 7) Penalty points (sec 9.5); 8) 12-point sending off offences

==== Results summary ====
| Overall | | | | | | | | Home | | | | | | Away | | | | | |
| Pld | W | D | L | GF | GA | GD | Pts | W | D | L | GF | GA | GD | W | D | L | GF | GA | GD |
|---|---|---|---|---|---|---|---|---|---|---|---|---|---|---|---|---|---|---|---|
| 46 | 12 | 17 | 17 | 51 | 59 | −8 | 53 | 7 | 11 | 5 | 28 | 23 | +5 | 5 | 6 | 12 | 23 | 36 | −13 |

Last updated: 22 March 2022.

==== Results by matchday ====
| Matchday | 1 | 2 | 3 | 4 | 5 | 6 | 7 | 8 | 9 | 10 | 11 | 12 | 13 | 14 | 15 | 16 | 17 | 18 | 19 | 20 | 21 | 22 | 23 | 24 | 25 | 26 | 27 | 28 | 29 | 30 | 31 | 32 | 33 | 34 | 35 | 36 | 37 | 38 | 39 | 40 | 41 | 42 | 43 | 44 | 45 | 46 |
|---|---|---|---|---|---|---|---|---|---|---|---|---|---|---|---|---|---|---|---|---|---|---|---|---|---|---|---|---|---|---|---|---|---|---|---|---|---|---|---|---|---|---|---|---|---|---|
| Ground | A | H | H | A | H | A | H | A | H | A | H | A | A | H | A | H | A | H | H | A | A | H | A | H | A | A | A | H | A | H | H | A | A | H | H | A | H | A | H | H | H | A | H | A | H | A |
| Result | L | D | L | W | D | W | W | D | L | L | L | D | D | W | W | D | D | D | D | L | L | W | L | D | D | D | L | D | W | D | W | L | L | D | D | L | L | L | W | D | W | L | W | L | L | W |
| Position | 16 | 15 | 22 | 15 | 17 | 10 | 5 | 8 | 11 | 16 | 18 | 17 | 18 | 15 | 13 | 13 | 13 | 13 | 13 | 16 | 18 | 14 | 18 | 18 | 18 | 18 | 18 | 19 | 17 | 16 | 16 | 17 | 17 | 18 | 17 | 19 | 19 | 20 | 19 | 20 | 16 | 17 | 15 | 18 | 20 | 18 |

Updated to match(es) played on 26 March 2022. Source: Statto.com
A = Away; H = Home; W = Win; D = Draw; L = Loss

==== Matches ====
Dale's fixtures were announced on 24 June 2021.

| 7 August 2021 1 | Harrogate Town | 3–2 | Rochdale | Harrogate |
| 15:00 BST | Armstrong 5'; Pattison 10' (yellow card) 59'; Burrell 90+1' | Report | Newby 15'; Beesley (yellow card) 43'; Grant 49'; Odoh (yellow card) 60' | Stadium: EnviroVent Stadium; Attendance: 1,841; Referee: Antony Coggins |

| 14 August 2021 2 | Rochdale | 0–0 | Scunthorpe United | Rochdale |
| 15:00 BST | | Report | | Stadium: Spotland Stadium; Attendance: 2,679; Referee: Martin Coy |

| 17 August 2021 3 | Rochdale | 1–2 | Forest Green Rovers | Rochdale |
| 19:45 BST | O'Keeffe (yellow card) 22'; Newby 48' | Report | Matt 33'; Stevens 49' | Stadium: Spotland Stadium; Attendance: 2,188; Referee: Andy Haines |

| 21 August 2021 4 | Northampton Town | 1–3 | Rochdale | Northampton |
| 15:00 BST | Guthrie 21'; Nelson (yellow card) 46'; Hoskins (yellow card) 66' | Report | Taylor 17'; Andrews 73'; Odoh 90+5' | Stadium: Sixfields Stadium; Attendance: 4,870; Referee: Carl Brook |

| 27 August 2021 5 | Rochdale | 1–1 | Colchester United | Rochdale |
| 19:45 BST | Keohane 61' | Report | Taylor 40' (o.g.); Welch-Hayes (yellow card) 45'; Daniels (yellow card) 64'; Sarpong-Wiredu (yellow card) 87' | Stadium: Spotland Stadium; Attendance: 3,054; Referee: Rebecca Welch |

| 4 September 2021 6 | Port Vale | 2–3 | Rochdale | Stoke-on-Trent |
| 15:00 BST | Proctor 8', 59' | Report | Beesley 24', 53' (yellow card) 88'; O'Keeffe 78'; O'Connell (yellow card) 90+1' | Stadium: Vale Park; Attendance: 6,113; Referee: Marc Edwards |

| 11 September 2021 7 | Rochdale | 1–0 | Tranmere Rovers | Rochdale |
| 15:00 BST | Dooley (yellow card) 76'; Cashman 84'; Dorsett (yellow card) 87' | Report | Watson (yellow card) 23'; Davies (yellow card) 26'; McManaman (yellow card) 36' | Stadium: Spotland Stadium; Attendance: 4,877; Referee: Charles Breakspear |

| 18 September 2021 8 | Mansfield Town | 1–1 | Rochdale | Mansfield |
| 15:00 BST | Maris (yellow card) 68'; McLaughlin (yellow card) 71'; Johnson 73' (yellow card) 90+1'; Clarke (yellow card) 90+4' | Report | Cashman 50' | Stadium: Field Mill; Attendance: 4,336; Referee: Carl Boyeson |

| 25 September 2021 9 | Rochdale | 0–1 | Oldham Athletic | Rochdale |
| 15:00 BST | O'Connell (yellow card) 35' | Report | Keillor-Dunn 59'; Whelan (yellow card) 89' | Stadium: Spotland Stadium; Attendance: 5,234; Referee: Will Finnie |

| 2 October 2021 10 | Bradford City | 2–0 | Rochdale | Bradford |
| 15:00 BST | Gilliead 37' (yellow card) 40'; O'Connor (yellow card) 66'; Cook 75' (pen.); Ridehalgh (yellow card) 81' | Report | | Stadium: Valley Parade; Attendance: 15,809; Referee: James Bell |

| 9 October 2021 11 | Rochdale | 0–1 | Crawley Town | Rochdale |
| 15:00 BST | Cashman (yellow card) 90+4' | Report | Appiah 14'; Bansal-McNulty (yellow card) 60'; Craig (yellow card) 85' | Stadium: Spotland Stadium; Attendance: 2,268; Referee: Ollie Yates |

| 16 October 2021 12 | Swindon Town | 2–2 | Rochdale | Swindon |
| 15:00 BST | Gladwin 37'; Mitchell-Lawson (yellow card) 82'; Williams 90+3' | Report | O'Connell (yellow card) 45+1'; Broadbent 57'; Kelly 79' | Stadium: The County Ground; Attendance: 9,310; Referee: Simon Mather |

| 19 October 2021 13 | Salford City | 0–0 | Rochdale | Salford |
| 19:45 BST | Willock (yellow card) 32'; Lowe (yellow card) 50'; Touray (yellow card) 70' | Report | Broadbent (yellow card) 17'; O'Keeffe (yellow card) 68' | Stadium: Moor Lane; Attendance: 2,173; Referee: Seb Stockbridge |

| 23 October 2021 14 | Rochdale | 3–2 | Sutton United | Rochdale |
| 15:00 BST | Newby 23'; Kelly 66'; Morley 90+5' | Report | Bennett (red card) 45+2'; Olaofe 82'; Smith 90' | Stadium: Spotland Stadium; Attendance: 2,248; Referee: Paul Howard |

| 30 October 2021 15 | Barrow | 1–2 | Rochdale | Barrow-in-Furness |
| 15:30 BST | Gordon (yellow card) 53'; Banks 56'; Brown (yellow card) 58'; Platt (yellow card) 90+3' | Report | Beesley 28', 72'; Graham (yellow card) 53'; Odoh (yellow card) 85' | Stadium: Holker Street; Attendance: 3,366; Referee: Declan Bourne |

| 13 November 2021 16 | Rochdale | 2–2 | Leyton Orient | Rochdale |
| 15:00 GMT | Newby 1', 90'; Odoh (yellow card) 11'; O'Keeffe (yellow card) 31'; Coleman (yellow card) 90+3' | Report | Kyprianou (yellow card) 15'; Drinan 24'; Ogie (yellow card) 30'; Clay 66'; Kemp (yellow card) 69'; Smith (yellow card) 90+3' | Stadium: Spotland Stadium; Attendance: 2,751; Referee: Anthony Backhouse |

| 20 November 2021 17 | Walsall | 0–0 | Rochdale | Walsall |
| 15:00 BST | Monthé (yellow card) 54' | Report | Dorsett (yellow card) 51' | Stadium: Bescot Stadium; Attendance: 6,144; Referee: Sam Purkiss |

| 23 November 2021 18 | Rochdale | 2–2 | Stevenage | Rochdale |
| 19:00 GMT | Beesley 4'; Andrews 35'; Kelly (yellow card) 90' | Report | List 27', 47'; Melbourne (yellow card) 74'; Read (yellow card) 89'; Cuthbert (yellow card) 90+4' | Stadium: Spotland Stadium; Attendance: 2,176; Referee: Scott Oldham |

| 27 November 2021 19 | Rochdale | 1–1 | Exeter City | Rochdale |
| 15:00 GMT | Taylor 69' | Report | Ray 59' | Stadium: Spotland Stadium; Attendance: 2,102; Referee: Andy Haines |

| 8 December 2021 20 | Hartlepool United | 2–1 | Rochdale | Hartlepool |
| 19:45 GMT | Odusina (yellow card) 15'; Cullen 64'; Shelton 90+2' | Report | Andrews 55'; White (yellow card) 66' | Stadium: Victoria Park; Attendance: 4,214; Referee: Tom Nield |

| 11 December 2021 21 | Bristol Rovers | 4–2 | Rochdale | Bristol |
| 15:00 GMT | Evans 10'; Collins 51', 89'; Anderson 84' | Report | Beesley 60', 66' (pen.) (yellow card) 64' | Stadium: Memorial Stadium; Attendance: 6,215; Referee: James Linington |

| 18 December 2021 22 | Rochdale | 3–0 | Newport County | Rochdale |
| 15:00 GMT | Beesley 2', 72' (pen.); Coleman (yellow card) 64'; Grant (yellow card) 74'; Kelly 89' | Report | Demetriou (yellow card) 70'; Norman (yellow card) 72' | Stadium: Spotland Stadium; Attendance: 2,232; Referee: Carl Boyeson |

| 26 December 2021 P | Carlisle United | P–P | Rochdale | Carlisle |
| | | | | Stadium: Brunton Park |
Note: Postponed due to positive Covid-19 cases.

| 29 December 2021 P | Rochdale | P–P | Port Vale | Rochdale |
| | | | | Stadium: Spotland Stadium |
Note: Postponed due to positive Covid-19 cases.

| 1 January 2022 P | Rochdale | P–P | Mansfield Town | Rochdale |
| | | | | Stadium: Spotland Stadium |
Note: Postponed due to positive Covid-19 cases.

| 8 January 2022 P | Colchester United | P–P | Rochdale | Colchester |
| 15:00 GMT | | Report | | Stadium: Colchester Community Stadium |
Note: Postponed due to a waterlogged pitch.

| 15 January 2022 23 | Tranmere Rovers | 2–0 | Rochdale | Birkenhead |
| 15:00 GMT | Jolley 3', 16' (yellow card) 48'; Doohan (yellow card) 90+2' | Report | | Stadium: Prenton Park; Attendance: 7,046; Referee: Ben Toner |

| 22 January 2022 24 | Rochdale | 0–0 | Bradford City | Rochdale |
| 15:00 GMT | | Report | O'Connor (yellow card) 63' | Stadium: Spotland Stadium; Attendance: 4,941; Referee: Carl Brook |

| 29 January 2022 25 | Oldham Athletic | 0–0 | Rochdale | Oldham |
| 15:00 GMT | Hunt (yellow card) 8'; Hart (yellow card) 51'; Piergianni (yellow card) 57' | Report | O'Keeffe (yellow card) 51'; O'Connell (yellow card) 88' | Stadium: Boundary Park; Attendance: 8,199; Referee: Darren Drysdale |

| 1 February 2022 26 | Colchester United | 1–1 | Rochdale | Colchester |
| 19:45 GMT | Skuse (yellow card) 41'; Judge 53' | Report | O'Connell (yellow card) 65'; Grant 76' | Stadium: Colchester Community Stadium; Attendance: 2,298; Referee: Craig Hicks |

| 5 February 2022 P | Rochdale | P–P | Carlisle United | Rochdale |
| 15:00 GMT | | Report | | Stadium: Spotland Stadium |
Note: Postponed due to a waterlogged pitch.

| 8 February 2022 27 | Forest Green Rovers | 2–1 | Rochdale | Nailsworth |
| 19:45 GMT | Cargill (yellow card) 61'; Aitchison 73'; Stevens 86' | Report | Ball 47'; Campbell (yellow card) 64' | Stadium: The New Lawn; Attendance: 1,923; Referee: Paul Howard |

| 12 February 2022 28 | Rochdale | 3–3 | Harrogate Town | Rochdale |
| 15:00 GMT | Clark 18'; O'Connell (yellow card) 48'; Odoh 61'; Ball (yellow card) 76'; Campbell 87' | Report | Pattison 3', 24' (pen.); Diamond 47'; Legge (yellow card) 66' | Stadium: Spotland Stadium; Attendance: 2,264; Referee: Neil Hair |

| 19 February 2022 29 | Scunthorpe United | 1–2 | Rochdale | Scunthorpe |
| 15:00 GMT | Onariase 13'; Rowe (yellow card) 17'; Hackney (yellow card) 28' | Report | O'Connell (yellow card) 38'; Kelly 51'; Taylor 83'; Broadbent (yellow card) 90+5' | Stadium: Glanford Park; Attendance: 2,548; Referee: Bobby Madley |

| 22 February 2022 30 | Rochdale | 1–1 | Port Vale | Rochdale |
| 19:45 GMT | O'Connell (yellow card) 76'; Ball 90+3'; O'Keeffe (yellow card) 90+6' | Report | Garrity 45'; Worrall (yellow card) 55' | Stadium: Spotland Stadium; Attendance: 2,667; Referee: Sam Barrott |

| 26 February 2022 31 | Rochdale | 1–0 | Northampton Town | Rochdale |
| 15:00 GMT | Campbell 53' | Report | Mills (yellow card) 78'; Lubala (yellow card) 88' | Stadium: Spotland Stadium; Attendance: 2,643; Referee: Ollie Yates |

| 1 March 2022 32 | Carlisle United | 2–0 | Rochdale | Carlisle |
| 19:45 GMT | Patrick 25'; Gibson (yellow card) 79'; Armer (yellow card) 88'; Sho-Silva 89' | Report | | Stadium: Brunton Park; Attendance: 5,360; Referee: Marc Edwards |

| 5 March 2022 33 | Sutton United | 3–0 | Rochdale | Sutton |
| 15:00 GMT | Boldewijn 12', 45+2'; Kizzi 57'; Milsom (yellow card) 78' | Report | O'Connell (yellow card) 22'; Dorsett (yellow card) 41' | Stadium: Gander Green Lane; Attendance: 2,874; Referee: Ben Speedie |

| 12 March 2022 34 | Rochdale | 0–0 | Barrow | Rochdale |
| 15:00 GMT | Dorsett (yellow card) 68'; Broadbent (yellow card) 84' | Report | Banks (yellow card) 45+2'; Sea (yellow card) 86' | Stadium: Spotland Stadium; Attendance: 2,935; Referee: Charles Breakspear |

| 15 March 2022 35 | Rochdale | 1–1 | Salford City | Rochdale |
| 19:45 GMT | Ball 27'; Kelly (yellow card) 72' | Report | Lund 66' | Stadium: Spotland Stadium; Attendance: 2,041; Referee: Chris Sarginson |

| 19 March 2022 36 | Leyton Orient | 3–1 | Rochdale | Leyton |
| 15:00 GMT | Smyth 40'; Kyprianou (yellow card) 49'; Sotiriou 58'; Smith 80'; Vigouroux (yellow card) 85' | Report | Newby 6'; Ball (yellow card) 82'; Campbell (yellow card) 85' | Stadium: Brisbane Road; Attendance: 4,791; Referee: David Rock |

| 22 March 2022 37 | Rochdale | 0–1 | Mansfield Town | Rochdale |
| 19:45 GMT | Downing (yellow card) 31' | Report | Bowery 86' | Stadium: Spotland Stadium; Attendance: 2,088; Referee: Seb Stockbridge |

| 26 March 2022 38 | Crawley Town | 1–0 | Rochdale | Crawley |
| 15:00 GMT | Nadesan 18'; Davies (yellow card) 85' | Report | | Stadium: Broadfield Stadium; Attendance: 2,164; Referee: Trevor Kettle |

| 29 March 2022 39 | Rochdale | 2–0 | Carlisle United | Rochdale |
| 19:45 BST | Kelly 10' (pen.); Lynch (yellow card) 70'; Grant 81' | Report | Simeu (yellow card) 5'; Devine (yellow card) 63'; Dickenson (yellow card) 90+3' | Stadium: Spotland Stadium; Attendance: 2,160; Referee: James Oldham |

| 2 April 2022 40 | Rochdale | 0–0 | Swindon Town | Rochdale |
| 15:00 BST | Dorsett (yellow card) 12' | Report | Iandolo (yellow card) 55' | Stadium: Spotland Stadium; Attendance: 2,779; Referee: Declan Bourne |

| 9 April 2022 41 | Rochdale | 1–0 | Walsall | Rochdale |
| 15:00 BST | Grant 55' | Report | Perry (yellow card) 45+1'; Labadie (yellow card) 73'; Wilkinson (yellow card) 86' | Stadium: Spotland Stadium; Attendance: 2,437; Referee: Adam Herczeg |

| 15 April 2022 42 | Stevenage | 1–0 | Rochdale | Stevenage |
| 15:00 BST | Cuthbert 48'; Lines (yellow card) 87' | Report | O'Connell (yellow card) 90+1' | Stadium: Broadhall Way; Attendance: 3,172; Referee: Robert Lewis |

| 18 April 2022 43 | Rochdale | 2–1 | Hartlepool United | Rochdale |
| 15:00 BST | Keohane 61'; Dooley (yellow card) 83'; O'Connell 90+4' | Report | Morris 10' | Stadium: Spotland Stadium; Attendance: 2,900; Referee: Tom Nield |

| 23 April 2022 44 | Exeter City | 2–0 | Rochdale | Exeter |
| 15:00 BST | Dieng 34'; Zanzala (yellow card) 52'; Jay 60'; Brown (yellow card) 81'; Key (yellow card) 85' | Report | McNulty (yellow card) 51'; Taylor (yellow card) 75' | Stadium: St James Park; Attendance: 6,935; Referee: Carl Brook |

| 30 April 2022 45 | Rochdale | 3–4 | Bristol Rovers | Rochdale |
| 15:00 BST | Charman 11', 17' (yellow card) 85'; Keohane (yellow card) 58'; O'Keeffe 60' (yellow card) 83'; Taylor (yellow card) 69' | Report | Finley 54'; Collins 66', 89'; Anderson 90+5'; Coutts (red card) 90+8' | Stadium: Spotland Stadium; Attendance: 4,628; Referee: Ross Joyce |

| 7 May 2022 46 | Newport County | 0–2 | Rochdale | Newport |
| 15:00 BST | | Report | Done 16'; Odoh 90+2' | Stadium: Rodney Parade; Attendance: 5,322; Referee: Lee Swabey |

=== FA Cup ===
Rochdale were drawn at home to Notts County in the first round and Plymouth Argyle in the second round.

| 7 November 2021 First round | Rochdale | 1–1 | Notts County | Rochdale |
| 15:00 GMT | O'Keeffe 45' (yellow card) 89' | Report | Kelly-Evans (yellow card) 3'; Wootton 62'; Cameron (yellow card) 85' | Stadium: Spotland Stadium; Attendance: 2,587; Referee: Ross Joyce |

| 16 November 2021 First round replay | Notts County | 1–2 | Rochdale | Nottingham |
| 19:45 GMT | White 63' (o.g.) | Report | Andrews 15'; Dorsett (yellow card) 72'; Beesley 90' | Stadium: Meadow Lane; Attendance: 4,416; Referee: James Bell |

| 5 December 2021 Second round | Rochdale | 1–2 | Plymouth Argyle | Rochdale |
| 12:15 GMT | Morley 55' | Report | Garrick 17'; Wilson (yellow card) 37'; Law (yellow card) 64'; Houghton (yellow card) 77'; Jephcott 86' | Stadium: Spotland Stadium; Attendance: 2,687; Referee: Andrew Kitchen |

=== EFL Cup ===
Rochdale were drawn away to Harrogate Town in the first round Shrewsbury Town in the second round and Burnley in the third round.

| 10 August 2021 First round | Harrogate Town | Away Walkover | Rochdale | Harrogate |
| 19:45 BST | | | | Stadium: EnviroVent Stadium |
Note: Match was postponed due to positive cases of COVID-19 being identified within Harrogate's squad. Rochdale received a bye into the second round after it was determined the fixture could not be rearranged within the required time period.

| 24 August 2021 Second round | Shrewsbury Town | 0–2 | Rochdale | Shrewsbury |
| 19:45 BST | Bennett (yellow card) 53'; Ebanks-Landell (yellow card) 60'; Pennington (red card) 67' | Report | Odoh (yellow card) 36'; Beesley 68' (pen.); Cashman 77' | Stadium: Montgomery Waters Meadow; Attendance: 2,229; Referee: Scott Oldham |

| 21 September 2021 Third round | Burnley | 4–1 | Rochdale | Burnley |
| 19:45 BST | Rodriguez 50', 60', 62', 76'; Tarkowski (yellow card) 63' | Report | Beesley 47'; O'Keeffe (yellow card) 63'; O'Connell (yellow card) 64' | Stadium: Turf Moor; Referee: Geoff Eltringham |

=== EFL Trophy ===
Rochdale were drawn into Northern Group D alongside Bolton Wanderers, Liverpool U21s and Port Vale. The dates for the group stage fixtures were revealed on July 8.

| Pos | Div | Team | Pld | W | PW | PL | L | GF | GA | GD | Pts | Qualification |
|---|---|---|---|---|---|---|---|---|---|---|---|---|
| 1 | L1 | Bolton Wanderers | 3 | 3 | 0 | 0 | 0 | 10 | 3 | +7 | 9 | Advance to Round 2 |
| 2 | L2 | Port Vale | 3 | 2 | 0 | 0 | 1 | 8 | 3 | +5 | 6 | Advance to Round 2 |
| 3 | L2 | Rochdale | 3 | 1 | 0 | 0 | 2 | 4 | 4 | 0 | 3 | |
| 4 | ACA | Liverpool U21 | 3 | 0 | 0 | 0 | 3 | 1 | 13 | −12 | 0 | |

Source: EFL.com

| 31 August 2021 Group game 1 | Rochdale | 4–0 | Liverpool U21s | Rochdale |
| 19:00 BST | Kelly 33'; O'Keeffe 50' (pen.), 72'; Andrews 78' | Report | | Stadium: Spotland Stadium; Attendance: 1,107; Referee: Ben Toner |

| 5 October 2021 Group game 2 | Port Vale | 1–0 | Rochdale | Burslem |
| 19:00 BST | J. Taylor (yellow card) 2'; Walker (yellow card) 40'; Benning (yellow card) 82'; M. Taylor 90+3' (o.g.) | Report | Keohane (yellow card) 29'; M. Taylor (yellow card) 55'; Kelly (yellow card) 57' | Stadium: Vale Park; Attendance: 1,727; Referee: James Oldham |

| 2 November 2021 Group game 3 | Rochdale | 0–3 | Bolton Wanderers | Rochdale |
| 19:00 GMT | Cashman (yellow card) 4' | Report | Afolayan 16'; John 19'; Doyle 45+1' (pen.) | Stadium: Spotland Stadium; Attendance: 1,116; Referee: Andrew Kitchen |

== Transfers ==
=== Transfers in ===
| Date | Position | Nationality | Name | From | Fee | Ref. |
|---|---|---|---|---|---|---|
| 29 July 2021 | CB | (England) | Sam Graham | (England) Sheffield United | Free transfer | |
| 2 August 2021 | CB | (England) | Max Taylor | (England) Manchester United | Free transfer | |
| 5 August 2021 | LB | (Republic of Ireland) | Aidy White | (Scotland) Heart of Midlothian | Free transfer | |
| 6 August 2021 | GK | (England) | Joel Coleman | (England) Fleetwood Town | Free transfer | |
| 24 August 2021 | CM | (Republic of Ireland) | Liam Kelly | (Netherlands) Feyenoord | Free transfer | |
| 15 September 2021 | CB | (England) | Jesper Laurence | (England) East Thurrock United | Undisclosed | |
| 20 January 2022 | CF | (England) | Luke Charman | (England) Darlington | Undisclosed | |
| 21 January 2022 | LB | (England) | Max Clark | (England) Fleetwood Town | Free transfer | |
| 27 January 2022 | CF | (England) | Tahvon Campbell | (England) Woking | Undisclosed | |
| 28 January 2022 | RB | (Republic of Ireland) | Corey O'Keeffe | (England) Mansfield Town | Free transfer | |
| 31 January 2022 | CM | (England) | James Ball | (England) Solihull Moors | Undisclosed | |

=== Loans in ===
| Date from | Position | Nationality | Name | From | Date until | Ref. |
|---|---|---|---|---|---|---|
| 3 August 2021 | CM | (England) | George Broadbent | (England) Sheffield United | 1 January 2022 | |
| 3 August 2021 | RB | (Republic of Ireland) | Corey O'Keeffe | (England) Mansfield Town | 1 January 2022 | |
| 6 August 2021 | CF | (England) | Danny Cashman | (England) Coventry City | End of season | |
| 10 August 2021 | CF | (England) | Josh Andrews | (England) Birmingham City | End of season | |
| 20 August 2021 | CB | (England) | Jeriel Dorsett | (England) Reading | End of season | |
| 13 January 2022 | CB | (England) | Paul Downing | (England) Portsmouth | End of season | |
| 30 April 2022 | GK | (England) | Jake Eastwood | (England) Sheffield United | 7 May 2022 | |

=== Loans out ===
| Date from | Position | Nationality | Name | To | Date until | Ref. |
|---|---|---|---|---|---|---|
| 23 October 2021 | GK | (England) | Bradley Wade | (England) Guiseley | 7 December 2021 | |
| 9 December 2021 | CB | (England) | Joe Dunne | (England) Stafford Rangers | End of season | |
| 9 February 2022 | GK | (England) | Brad Kelly | (England) Mossley | March 2022 | |
| 23 March 2022 | DF | (England) | Sam Graham | (England) Notts County | End of season | |
| 24 March 2022 | CM | (England) | Ethan Brierley | (England) Spennymoor Town | 29 April 2022 | |

=== Transfers out ===
| Date | Position | Nationality | Name | To | Fee | Ref. |
|---|---|---|---|---|---|---|
| 17 May 2021 | LW | (England) | Kwadwo Baah | (England) Watford | Undisclosed | |
| 30 June 2021 | CM | (England) | Lewis Bradley | Free agent | Released | |
| 30 June 2021 | CM | (England) | Harrison Hopper | (England) York City | Released | |
| 30 June 2021 | CM | (Northern Ireland) | Matty Lund | (England) Salford City | Contract expired | |
| 30 June 2021 | RB | (Northern Ireland) | Ryan McLaughlin | (England) Morecambe | Released | |
| 30 June 2021 | DF | (Republic of Ireland) | Paul McShane | (England) Manchester United | Released | |
| 30 June 2021 | CM | (Republic of Ireland) | Jimmy Ryan | Free agent | Released | |
| 30 June 2021 | DM | (Republic of Ireland) | Conor Shaughnessy | (England) Burton Albion | Free transfer | |
| 9 July 2021 | CF | (England) | Stephen Humphrys | (England) Wigan Athletic | Undisclosed | |
| 9 July 2021 | CM | (England) | Oliver Patrick | (England) Accrington Stanley | Free transfer | |
| 12 July 2021 | MF | (England) | Ethan Pye | (England) Stockport County | Free transfer | |
| 4 August 2021 | CM | (England) | Oliver Rathbone | (England) Rotherham United | Undisclosed | |
| 10 January 2022 | CF | (England) | Jake Beesley | (England) Blackpool | Undisclosed | |
| 11 January 2022 | CM | (England) | Aaron Morley | (England) Bolton Wanderers | Undisclosed | |
