= Josh Andrews (footballer) =

English footballer (born 2001)

Personal information
- Full name: Joshua Matthew Andrews
- Date of birth: 16 October 2001 (age 25)
- Place of birth: Solihull, England
- Height: 6 ft 5 in (1.96 m)
- Position: Striker

Team information
- Current team: Grimsby Town
- Number: 19

Youth career
- Wychall Wanderers
- 2009–2020: Birmingham City

Senior career*
Years	Team	Apps	(Gls)
2020–2024	Birmingham City	0	(0)
2021	→ Harrogate Town (loan)	3	(0)
2021–2022	→ Rochdale (loan)	17	(3)
2022–2023	→ Doncaster Rovers (loan)	4	(0)
2023–2024	→ Accrington Stanley (loan)	20	(5)
2024–2026	Gillingham	55	(5)
2026–	Grimsby Town	5	(2)
- * Club domestic league appearances and goals as of 14:06, 22 November 2026 (UTC)

Joshua Matthew Andrews (born 16 October 2001) is an English professional footballer who plays as a striker for EFL League Two club Grimsby Town.

Andrews began his career with Birmingham City, but never played for their first team. He made his Football League debut while on loan to Harrogate Town of League Two in 2021, and made three more loans to League Two clubs, Rochdale in 2021–22, Doncaster Rovers in the first half of 2022–23, and Accrington Stanley in the first half of 2023–24, before joining Gillingham in February 2024.

== Early and personal life ==
Andrews was born in Solihull, where he attended Greswold Primary School and Langley School, and played football for Wychall Wanderers. He was a childhood fan of Birmingham City.

== Career ==
=== Birmingham City ===
Andrews joined Birmingham City's academy in 2009, and took up a scholarship with the club in July 2018. According to his club profile at under-23 level, he "cites his finishing, hold-up play and runs in behind as his main attributes and is looking to make improvements in his heading."

Birmingham City made him an offer of professional terms in April 2020, and in July he signed a two-year contract with an option for a third year. In November, coach Steve Spooner highlighted his having "grown into his body", so that the 6 ft 3 in (1.91 m) youth had become a large man with increasing ability to use his physicality, as well as "finding and working space for himself inside the box". He scored seven goals in four matches for Birmingham's under-23 team in October and November, including all four in a 5–4 loss to Ipswich Town U23 and winners against Swansea City U23 and Colchester United U23, and by the end of January 2021 had nine goals and four assists from eleven appearances.

Andrews signed for League Two club Harrogate Town on 1 February 2021 on loan for the remainder of the season. According to Harrogate manager Simon Weaver, "It's his first loan which means it's not about starting every game but adapting to the culture and learning. When Birmingham told me he's the type of lad that's willing to learn, it became a no-brainer for us." His Birmingham U23 team-mate Mitchell Roberts had made the same move a few weeks earlier. Andrews made his club and Football League debut on 6 February, as a very late substitute in a 3–1 win away to Crawley Town. He made a similarly brief appearance in the next match, returned to Birmingham for treatment to an injury, and was not used again until the final fixture of the season. He returned to help Birmingham's U23s win the overall Professional Development League title. According to the Birmingham Mail, his introduction at half-time was "a big reason for Blues' improved second half showing" in the semi-final against Bristol City U23, and he played the last quarter-hour of the final, in which Birmingham beat Sheffield United U23 2–0.

Andrews joined another League Two club, Rochdale, on 10 August 2021 on loan for the 2021–22 season. He made his debut a week later, replacing the injured Jake Beesley after 24 minutes of a 2–1 defeat at home to Forest Green Rovers. Andrews started the next match, away to previously unbeaten Northampton Town; after 73 minutes, he beat the offside trap to score his first senior goal and help his side secure their first win of the season. Injury again interrupted his progress: a hamstring problem kept him out for several weeks, but he returned to form, with four goals from twelve matches. According to Rochdale manager Robbie Stockdale, he was getting into good positions but needed to take his chances: "I think he himself would say he probably should be on five or six now – which would be a good return for the games he has been available for." After turning his ankle in January 2022, he returned to Birmingham for treatment. Having demonstrated his fitness with a "thunderbolt goal" for Birmingham's U23s, he made five brief substitute appearances for Rochdale over the last six weeks of the season to take his totals to five goals from 22 matches in all competitions.

In April 2022, Birmingham took up their option to extend Andrews' contract for a further year. In July, he joined another League Two club, Doncaster Rovers, on loan until January 2023. After five appearances without scoring, Andrews returned to Birmingham for treatment to tendonitis in his knee, and did not play for Doncaster again.

Another League Two club, Accrington Stanley, signed Andrews on 22 July 2023 on loan for the coming season. He played the whole of the opening fixture, a 3–0 win at home to Newport County, and in the EFL Cup against Bradford City, he tied the scores with a powerful header shortly after coming on as a second-half substitute, but Stanley lost the match on penalties. Andrew scored six goals from 22 appearances in all competitions before being recalled by Birmingham on 1 February 2024, transfer deadline day.

=== Gillingham ===
Andrews joined League Two club Gillingham on 1 February 2024 for an undisclosed fee. Injuries prevented Andrews from making his debut for the Kent side until 23 March, when he appeared as a 79th-minute substitute in a 3–2 away win over Morecambe. He made his first start on 13 April in a 3–0 win against Barrow; in first-half stoppage-time, he took Remeao Hutton's through ball round the goalkeeper to open the scoring, and in the second half, he won the corner from which a Barrow player scored an own goal. He finished the season with seven appearances and one goal.

He was released by Gillingham at the end of the 2025–26 season.

=== Grimsby Town ===
In June 2026, it was announced that Andrews would sign a two-year deal for Grimsby Town on 1 July 2026.

Andrews made his competitive debut on 8 August 2026, replacing Kieran Green during a 3–1 defeat against Blackpool in the first round of the EFL Cup. He made his League Two debut the following week as a substitute in a 1–0 victory over Exeter City.

Andrews was subsequently sidelined through injury and missed approximately two months of the season. He returned on 24 October, coming on as a substitute during a 4–1 victory away to his former club Gillingham.

== Career statistics ==
As of match played 21 November 2026

Appearances and goals by club, season and competition
Club	Season	League			FA Cup		EFL Cup		Other		Total	
Club	Season	Division	Apps	Goals	Apps	Goals	Apps	Goals	Apps	Goals	Apps	Goals
Birmingham City	2020–21	Championship	0	0	0	0	0	0	—		0	0
Birmingham City	2021–22	Championship	0	0	0	0	—		—		0	0
Birmingham City	2022–23	Championship	0	0	0	0	—		—		0	0
Birmingham City	2023–24	Championship	0	0	0	0	0	0	—		0	0
Birmingham City	Total		0	0	0	0	0	0	0	0	0	0
Harrogate Town (loan)	2020–21	League Two	3	0	—		—		—		3	0
Rochdale (loan)	2021–22	League Two	17	3	2	1	2	0	1 (Note: Appearances in EFL Trophy)	1	22	5
Doncaster Rovers (loan)	2022–23	League Two	4	0	0	0	1	0	0	0	5	0
Accrington Stanley (loan)	2023–24	League Two	20	5	1	0	1	1	0	0	22	6
Gillingham	2023–24	League Two	7	1	—		—		—		7	1
Gillingham	2024–25	League Two	12	0	1	0	0	0	2	1	15	1
Gillingham	2025–26	League Two	36	4	1	0	1	0	2	0	40	4
Gillingham	Total		55	5	2	0	1	0	4	1	62	6
Grimsby Town	2026–27	League Two	5	2	1	0	1	0	0	0	7	2
Career total			104	15	6	1	6	1	5	2	121	19
