= Eoghan O'Connell =

Irish footballer (born 1995)

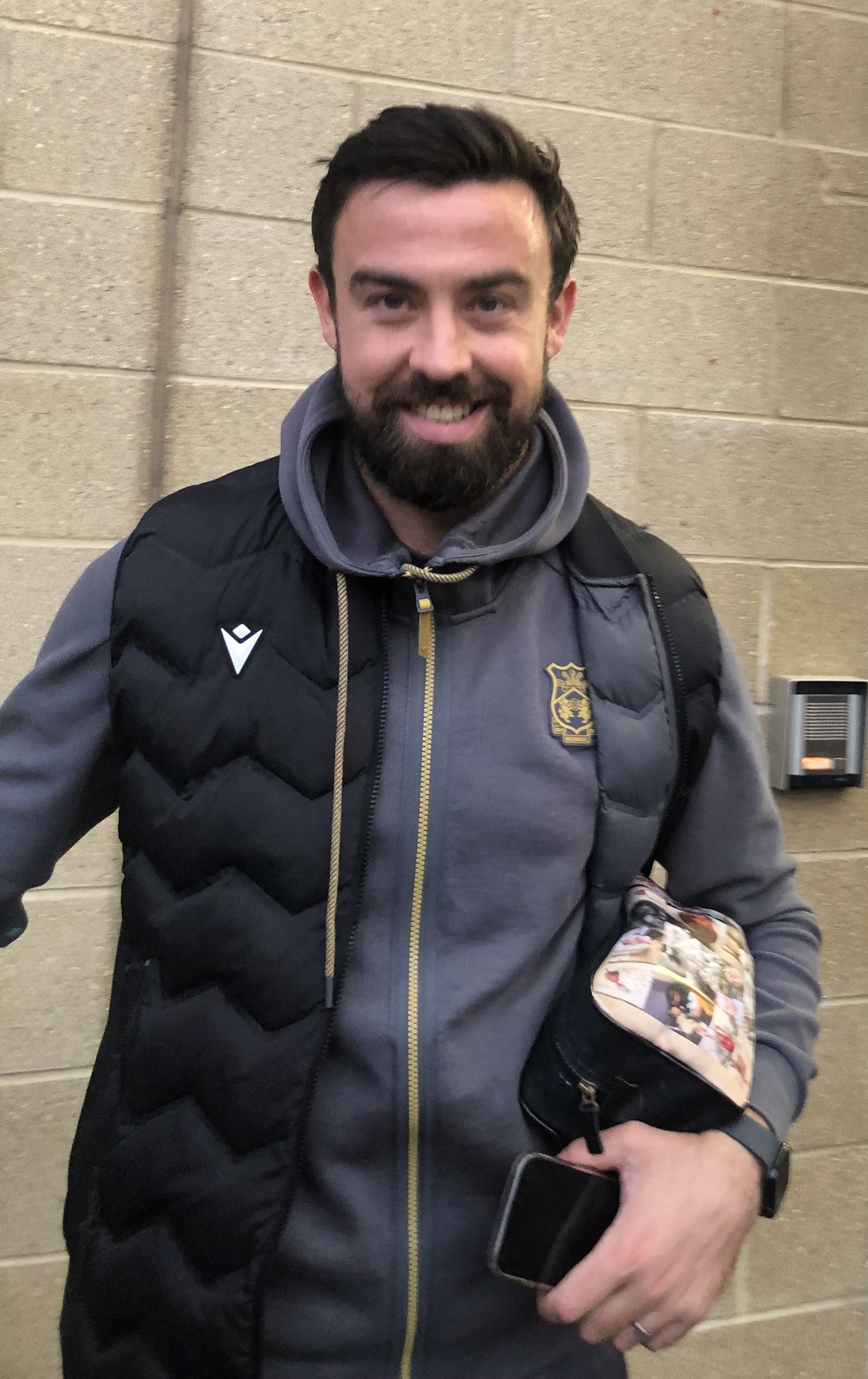
- Eoghan O'Connell in 2024.

Personal information
- Full name: Eoghan O'Connell
- Date of birth: 13 August 1995 (age 31)
- Place of birth: Cork, Ireland
- Height: 1.87 m (6 ft 2 in)
- Position: Centre-back

Team information
- Current team: Stockport County
- Number: 6

Youth career
- College Corinthians
- Avondale United
- 2011–2014: Celtic

Senior career*
Years	Team	Apps	(Gls)
2014–2017	Celtic	7	(0)
2015	→ Oldham Athletic (loan)	2	(0)
2016	→ Cork City (loan)	7	(1)
2017	→ Walsall (loan)	17	(1)
2017–2019	Bury	43	(2)
2019–2022	Rochdale	115	(2)
2022–2023	Charlton Athletic	19	(1)
2023–2025	Wrexham	84	(2)
2026	Barnsley	25	(1)
2026–	Stockport County	12	(0)

International career^{‡}
2013	Republic of Ireland U19	1	(0)
2016	Republic of Ireland U21	2	(0)
- * Club domestic league appearances and goals as of 00:04, 25 October 2026 (UTC) ‡ National team caps and goals as of 23:59, 31 January 2023 (UTC)

Eoghan O'Connell (born 13 August 1995) is an Irish professional footballer who plays as a centre-back for EFL League One side Stockport County. He began his youth playing career in the Republic of Ireland, joining the academy of Scottish club Celtic in 2011 and made his first-team debut three years later.

O'Connell is a cousin of former Irish rugby captain Paul O'Connell and has been capped at youth international level.

== Club career ==
=== Celtic ===
O'Connell played for the College Corinthians and Avondale United Irish academy teams, before switching to the Celtic Academy in 2011. On 9 January 2014, he made his first-team debut in a 3–1 victory over Turkish club Trabzonspor in the Turkish Airlines Antalya Cup. In March, he made his competitive debut against Ross County in a 1–1 draw in the Scottish Premiership. Speaking in April 2015 about his debut, he said, "Making my debut at the end of last season was a good thing as it gave me a good platform coming into the next season and show what I could do".

O'Connell started the 2014–15 season by scoring an own goal in a 1–0 league defeat against Inverness Caledonian Thistle. After making four appearances for the club in the season and captaining the youth team in a friendly against Sparta Prague, on 2 February 2015 he signed a contract extension that would keep him at Celtic until mid-2017. Commenting about the new contract, he said, "I'm delighted and just happy to get it done". At the end of the season, he was named as the club's Academy Player of the Year. Irish newspaper TheJournal.ie included Connell in their list of "10 most promising young Irish footballers".

O'Connell played his first match of the 2015–16 season, a 3–1 victory over Dundee United, in August. He moved to English League One club Oldham Athletic on a six-month loan deal on 1 September. Five days later, he made his first-team debut, playing the entirety of a 2–1 victory over Bradford City. He was injured after featuring in another match for Oldham, and returned to his parent club in November.

In February 2016, O'Connell went on-loan to his home-town club, League of Ireland side Cork City. Manager John Caulfield said O'Connell's signing "injects extra competition into the squad". He made his debut on 27 February, playing the whole match, in which Cork defeated Dundalk 2–0 in the President's Cup. He played five times for Cork, scoring once in a 2–2 draw with Galway United, before being recalled to Celtic at the end of April 2016 after sustaining a groin injury.

"I've been particularly impressed by young Eoghan. He's a good size, wants to do well and he's good in the air. He has been around the first team for a few years and had some loan experience."

— Celtic manager Brendan Rodgers on O'Connell.

On 27 July 2016, O'Connell made his UEFA Champions League debut, playing the whole ninety minutes of a 1–1 draw against Kazakh club FC Astana in the qualifiers. Speaking about his debut, manager Brendan Rodgers said O'Connell was "outstanding" and added; "For a young player, he has been on the fringes for a few years, coming into that environment, under pressure, he had very few mistakes in the game". He featured for the club in the return leg and again earned the praise of Rodgers.

After playing six matches for Celtic during the 2016–17 season, on 12 January 2017, O'Connell was loaned to English League One club Walsall for the rest of the season. He debuted in a 4–1 victory over Sheffield United; Walsall manager Jon Whitney said O'Connell "grew into the game and showed why we brought him in." On 21 January, he scored his first goal in a 3–1 victory over Bristol Rovers. He made 17 appearances for the club.

=== Bury ===
O'Connell signed a three-year contract with English League One club Bury on 8 June 2017. He said about his move; "I have come to the stage in my career where I just want to play football all the time. The manager made it clear that he had a big interest in me and wanted me to come to the club." He added that he was happy with the move and he wanted to start playing. O'Connell was injured during the pre-season and was ruled out of play for up to ten weeks. In October he made his first-team debut in a 1–0 victory over Blackburn Rovers in the EFL Trophy. Wearing the number six shirt, he became a first team regular in 2018–19 under manager Ryan Lowe.

=== Rochdale ===
On 4 July 2019, O'Connell signed a two-year contract with Rochdale.

On 22 June 2021, O'Connell signed a new one-year contract.

=== Charlton Athletic ===
On 20 June 2022, O'Connell signed a three-year contract with Charlton Athletic on a free transfer following the expiration of his contract at Rochdale.

=== Wrexham ===
On 31 January 2023, O'Connell signed for Wrexham. He started Wrexham's 3–1 win over Boreham Wood on 22 April 2023, which secured the club's return to the English Football League after 15 years in the National League. On 4 September 2025, it was announced he was leaving the club by mutual consent.

=== Barnsley ===
On 6 January 2026, O'Connell joined League One club Barnsley on a short-term deal until the end of the season.

=== Stockport County ===
On 30 June 2026, O'Connell joined League One side Stockport County on a two-year deal.

== International career ==
O'Connell made his Republic of Ireland under-19 debut against Norway in August 2013. In September 2016, he was called to the Republic of Ireland under-21 national football team by manager Noel King for 2017 UEFA European Under-21 Championship qualifiers against Slovenia and Serbia. On 2 September, he made his under-21 international debut in a 2–0 win against Slovenia.

== Style of play ==
O'Connell plays as a centre back. During his time with Celtic, the Herald Scotland described him as "an assured ball-playing centre-half with an air of calmness around him which has belied his lack of experience." His manager at Celtic, Brendan Rodgers, said O'Connell had an "in-built brain for the game."

== Personal life ==
O'Connell hails from Cork and is a supporter of local side Cork City. He is a cousin of former Irish rugby captain Paul O'Connell. Both his father Damo O'Connell and brother Andy O'Connell have played for Cork City. When asked after the 2026 World Cup Final if the Spanish defences performances were the best he had ever played against Lionel Messi referenced O’Connell’s performance against him for Celtic FC in the International Champions Cup, 2016 praising him for ‘his calmness and composure’, claiming that he could tell he would go on to have a fantastic career and play for some of the biggest teams in England.

== Career statistics ==
As of match played on 24 October 2026

Appearances and goals by club, season and competition
Club	Season	League			National cup (Note: Includes Scottish Cup, FAI Cup, FA Cup)		League cup (Note: Includes Scottish League Cup, League of Ireland Cup, EFL Cup)		Other		Total	
Club	Season	Division	Apps	Goals	Apps	Goals	Apps	Goals	Apps	Goals	Apps	Goals
Celtic	2013–14	Scottish Premiership	1	0	0	0	0	0	0	0	1	0
Celtic	2014–15	Scottish Premiership	3	0	0	0	1	0	0	0	4	0
Celtic	2015–16	Scottish Premiership	1	0	0	0	0	0	0	0	1	0
Celtic	2016–17	Scottish Premiership	2	0	0	0	1	0	4 (Note: Appearances in UEFA Champions League)	0	7	0
Celtic	Celtic total		7	0	0	0	2	0	4	0	13	0
Oldham Athletic (loan)	2015–16	League One	2	0	0	0	0	0	0	0	2	0
Cork City (loan)	2016	LOI Premier Division	7	1	0	0	1	0	1 (Note: Appearances in President of Ireland's Cup)	0	9	1
Walsall (loan)	2016–17	League One	17	1	0	0	0	0	0	0	17	1
Walsall (loan)	Loan club total		26	2	0	0	1	0	1	0	28	2
Bury	2017–18	League One	12	0	1	0	0	0	4 (Note: Appearances in EFL Trophy)	0	17	0
Bury	2018–19	League Two	31	2	1	0	1	1	2	0	35	3
Bury	Bury total		43	2	2	0	1	1	6	0	52	3
Rochdale	2019–20	League One	31	0	6	0	1	0	0	0	38	0
Rochdale	2020–21	League One	39	1	1	0	2	1	1	0	43	2
Rochdale	2021–22	League Two	45	1	3	0	2	0	0	0	50	1
Rochdale	Rochdale total		115	2	10	0	5	1	1	0	131	3
Charlton Athletic	2022–23	League One	19	1	0	0	3	0	0	0	22	1
Wrexham	2022–23	National League	15	2	0	0	0	0	0	0	15	2
Wrexham	2023–24	League Two	30	0	1	0	2	0	0	0	33	0
Wrexham	2024–25	League One	39	0	1	0	0	0	1	0	41	0
Wrexham	2025–26	Championship	0	0	0	0	2	0	—		2	0
Wrexham	Wrexham total		84	2	2	0	4	0	1	0	91	2
Barnsley	2025–26	League One	25	1	1	0	—		—		26	1
Stockport County	2026–27	League One	12	0	0	0	1	0	0	0	13	0
Career total			331	10	15	0	17	2	13	0	376	12

== Honours ==
Cork City

- President of Ireland's Cup: 2016

Bury

- League Two runner-up: 2018–19

Wrexham

- National League: 2022–23
- EFL League Two runner-up: 2023–24
- EFL League One runner-up: 2024–25

Individual

- Rochdale Player of the Season: 2019–20, 2021–22
