= 2020–21 Rochdale A.F.C. season =

English football club season

Rochdale
2020–21 season
- Chairman: Andrew Kilpatrick
- Manager: Brian Barry-Murphy
- Stadium: Spotland Stadium
- League One: 21st (relegated to League Two)
- FA Cup: First round
- EFL Cup: Second round
- EFL Trophy: Group stage
- Top goalscorer: League: Stephen Humphrys (11); All: Stephen Humphrys (11)
Home colours	Away colours	Third colours

The 2020–21 season was Rochdale A.F.C.'s 114th in existence and their seventh consecutive season in EFL League One, Along with League One, the club contested in the FA Cup, EFL Cup and EFL Trophy.

The season covered from 1 July 2020 to 30 June 2021. All matches were played without spectators because of the COVID-19 pandemic.

Relegation was confirmed on 1 May 2021, when Rochdale lost 2–1 at home to Doncaster Rovers. Manager Brian Barry-Murphy said after the match that he felt responsible for the result. On 30 June 2021, Rochdale released Barry-Murphy from his contract at his own request. Lee Riley and Jim McNulty took temporary charge of the first team.

== First-team squad ==
As of 18 January 2021

Note: Flags indicate national team as has been defined under FIFA eligibility rules. Players may hold more than one non-FIFA nationality.

No.	Name	Nat.	Position(s)	Date of birth (age)	Apps.	Goals	Year signed	Signed from	Transfer fee
Goalkeepers
1	Gavin Bazunu	(Republic of Ireland)	GK	20 February 2002 (age 24)	20	0	2020	(England) Manchester City	Loan
12	Jay Lynch	(England)	GK	31 March 1993 (age 33)	22	0	2019	(England) AFC Fylde	Loan
30	Ben Chalton	(England)	GK		0	0	2020	Academy	Trainee
Defenders
2	Ryan McLaughlin	(Northern Ireland)	RB/LB/RM	30 September 1994 (age 32)	38	0	2019	(England) Blackpool	Undisclosed
3	Gabriel Osho	(England)	CB/RB	14 August 1998 (age 28)	3	0	2021	(England) Luton Town	Loan
4	Jimmy McNulty	(England)	CB/LB	13 February 1985 (age 41)	207	4	2015	(England) Bury	Free
5	Paul McShane	(Republic of Ireland)	CB	6 January 1986 (age 40)	25	1	2019	Free agent	Free
6	Eoghan O'Connell	(Republic of Ireland)	CB	13 August 1995 (age 31)	60	2	2019	(England) Bury	Free
15	Haydon Roberts	(England)	CB/LB/DM	10 May 2002 (age 24)	19	0	2020	(England) Brighton & Hove Albion	Loan
19	Yeboah Amankwah	(England)	CB	19 October 2000 (age 26)	2	0	2020	(England) Manchester City	Loan
32	Joe Dunne	(England)	CB/LB	25 October 2001 (age 25)	3	0	2020	Academy	Trainee
Midfielders
7	Stephen Dooley	(Republic of Ireland)	LM/RM	19 October 1991 (age 35)	82	5	2018	(Northern Ireland) Coleraine	Free
8	Aaron Morley	(England)	CM/DM	27 February 2000 (age 26)	76	7	2017	Academy	Trainee
13	Jimmy Keohane	(Republic of Ireland) (England)	CM/AM/RM/RB	22 January 1991 (age 35)	76	5	2019	(Republic of Ireland) Cork City	Undisclosed
14	Oliver Rathbone	(England)	CM/DM/LM	10 October 1996 (age 30)	164	13	2015	(England) Manchester United	Free
16	Matt Done	(England)	LM/LW/LB	22 July 1988 (age 38)	264	32	2017	(England) Sheffield United	Free
18	Lewis Bradley	(England)	CM	29 May 2001 (age 25)	8	0	2019	Academy	Trainee
20	Jimmy Ryan	(Republic of Ireland) (England)	CM/RM/LM	6 September 1988 (age 38)	50	1	2019	(England) Blackpool	Free
21	Matty Lund	(Northern Ireland) (England)	CM/RB/RM	21 November 1990 (age 35)	162	34	2020	(England) Scunthorpe United	Undisclosed
23	Harrison Hopper	(England)	CM	24 December 2000 (age 25)	8	0	2019	Academy	Trainee
24	Ethan Brierley	(England)	CM		8	0	2020	Academy	Trainee
Forwards
9	Stephen Humphrys	(England)	CF/RW/LW	15 September 1997 (age 29)	14	7	2020	(England) Southend United	Free
10	Alex Newby	(England)	RW/CF	21 November 1995 (age 30)	29	7	2020	(England) Chorley	Free
11	Jake Beesley	(England)	CF	12 December 1996 (age 29)	19	3	2020	(England) Solihull Moors	Undisclosed
17	Fábio Tavares	(Portugal)	CF/LW/RW	22 January 2001 (age 25)	39	4	2019	Academy	Trainee
22	Kwadwo Baah	(England)	LW/RW	1 January 2001 (age 25)	28	3	2019	Academy	Trainee

=== Statistics ===
As of 9 May 2021

No.	Pos	Nat	Player	Total		League One		F.A. Cup		League Cup		League Trophy	
No.	Pos	Nat	Player	Apps	Goals	Apps	Goals	Apps	Goals	Apps	Goals	Apps	Goals
1	GK	(Republic of Ireland) IRL	Gavin Bazunu	32	0	29+0	0	1+0	0	2+0	0	0+0	0
2	DF	(Northern Ireland) NIR	Ryan McLaughlin	36	0	23+11	0	0+0	0	1+0	0	1+0	0
3	DF	(England) ENG	Tolaji Bola	12	0	9+2	0	1+0	0	0+0	0	0+0	0
3	DF	(England) ENG	Gabriel Osho	22	1	22+0	1	0+0	0	0+0	0	0+0	0
4	DF	(Scotland) SCO	Jimmy McNulty	22	0	9+8	0	1+0	0	1+0	0	3+0	0
5	DF	(Republic of Ireland) IRL	Paul McShane	20	0	18+1	0	0+0	0	1+0	0	0+0	0
6	DF	(Republic of Ireland) IRL	Eoghan O'Connell	43	2	39+0	1	1+0	0	2+0	1	1+0	0
7	MF	(Northern Ireland) NIR	Stephen Dooley	37	1	16+15	1	0+1	0	1+1	0	2+1	0
8	MF	(England) ENG	Aaron Morley	50	2	39+5	2	1+0	0	2+0	0	2+1	0
9	FW	(England) ENG	Stephen Humphrys	29	11	24+5	11	0+0	0	0+0	0	0+0	0
10	FW	(England) ENG	Alex Newby	43	7	27+11	6	1+0	0	2+0	0	0+2	1
11	FW	(England) ENG	Jake Beesley	30	7	27+0	6	1+0	0	0+0	0	2+0	1
12	GK	(England) ENG	Jay Lynch	20	0	17+0	0	0+0	0	0+0	0	3+0	0
13	MF	(Republic of Ireland) IRL	Jimmy Keohane	50	10	40+4	10	1+0	0	2+0	0	2+1	0
14	MF	(England) ENG	Oliver Rathbone	46	3	40+0	3	1+0	0	2+0	0	2+1	0
15	DF	(England) ENG	Haydon Roberts	26	0	24+2	0	0+0	0	0+0	0	0+0	0
16	MF	(England) ENG	Matt Done	41	3	20+17	3	0+0	0	2+0	0	2+0	0
17	FW	(Portugal) POR	Fábio Tavares	18	2	0+12	1	0+1	0	0+2	0	3+0	1
17	MF	(Ireland) EIR	Conor Grant	20	1	16+4	1	0+0	0	0+0	0	0+0	0
18	MF	(England) ENG	Lewis Bradley	1	0	0+0	0	0+0	0	0+0	0	1+0	0
19	DF	(England) ENG	Yeboah Amankwah	2	0	0+0	0	0+0	0	1+0	0	1+0	0
19	MF	(Republic of Ireland) IRL	Conor Shaughnessy	18	1	14+4	1	0+0	0	0+0	0	0+0	0
20	MF	(Republic of Ireland) IRL	Jimmy Ryan	17	0	11+3	0	1+0	0	1+1	0	0+0	0
21	MF	(Northern Ireland) NIR	Matty Lund	35	12	28+4	11	1+0	1	1+0	0	1+0	0
22	FW	(England) ENG	Kwadwo Baah	34	3	13+17	3	0+0	0	1+1	0	1+1	0
23	MF	(England) ENG	Harrison Hopper	3	0	0+1	0	0+0	0	0+0	0	2+0	0
24	MF	(England) ENG	Ethan Brierley	8	0	1+3	0	0+0	0	0+1	0	3+0	0
27	MF	(England) ENG	Abraham Odoh	2	0	0+2	0	0+0	0	0+0	0	0+0	0
29	FW	(Wales) WAL	Jack Vale	3	0	0+3	0	0+0	0	0+0	0	0+0	0
32	DF	(England) ENG	Joe Dunne	2	0	0+0	0	0+0	0	0+0	0	1+1	0
33	DF	(Poland) POL	Kacper Mialkowski	1	0	0+0	0	0+0	0	0+0	0	0+1	0

=== Goals record ===
As of 9 May 2021

Rank	No.	Nat.	Po.	Name	League One	FA Cup	League Cup	League Trophy	Total
1	21	(Northern Ireland)	CM	Matty Lund	11	1	0	0	12
2	9	(England)	CF	Stephen Humphrys	11	0	0	0	11
3	13	(Republic of Ireland)	AM	Jimmy Keohane	10	0	0	0	10
4	10	(England)	CF	Alex Newby	6	0	0	1	7
	11	(England)	CF	Jake Beesley	6	0	0	1	7
6	22	(England)	CF	Kwadwo Baah	3	0	0	0	3
	14	(England)	CM	Oliver Rathbone	3	0	0	0	3
	16	(England)	MF	Matt Done	3	0	0	0	3
9	17	(Portugal)	CF	Fábio Tavares	1	0	0	1	2
	6	(Republic of Ireland)	CB	Eoghan O'Connell	1	0	1	0	2
	8	(England)	CM	Aaron Morley	2	0	0	0	2
12	7	(Northern Ireland)	RM	Stephen Dooley	1	0	0	0	1
	17	(Republic of Ireland)	MF	Conor Grant	1	0	0	0	1
	19	(Republic of Ireland)	MF	Connor Shaughnessy	1	0	0	0	1
	3	(England)	DF	Gabriel Osho	1	0	0	0	1
Total					61	1	1	3	66

=== Disciplinary record ===
As of 9 May 2021

Rank	No.	Nat.	Po.	Name	League One			FA Cup			League Cup			League Trophy			Total		
Rank	No.	Nat.	Po.	Name	Yellow card	(yellow card) (yellow-red card)	Red card	Yellow card	(yellow card) (yellow-red card)	Red card	Yellow card	(yellow card) (yellow-red card)	Red card	Yellow card	(yellow card) (yellow-red card)	Red card	Yellow card	(yellow card) (yellow-red card)	Red card
1	21	(Northern Ireland)	CM	Matty Lund	10	0	0	0	0	0	0	0	0	1	0	0	11	0	0
2	6	(Republic of Ireland)	CB	Eoghan O'Connell	8	0	0	0	0	0	1	0	0	1	0	0	10	0	0
3	14	(England)	CM	Oliver Rathbone	7	0	1	0	0	0	1	0	0	1	0	0	9	0	1
4	22	(England)	CF	Kwadwo Baah	7	0	0	0	0	0	0	0	0	0	0	0	7	0	0
5	2	(Northern Ireland)	RB	Ryan McLaughlin	5	0	0	0	0	0	0	0	0	0	0	0	5	0	0
6	5	(Republic of Ireland)	CB	Paul McShane	4	0	0	0	0	0	0	0	0	0	0	0	4	0	0
7	20	(Republic of Ireland)	CM	Jimmy Ryan	3	0	0	0	0	0	0	0	0	0	0	0	3	0	0
7	7	(Northern Ireland)	RM	Stephen Dooley	2	0	0	0	0	0	0	0	0	1	0	0	3	0	0
7	11	(England)	CF	Jake Beesley	3	0	0	0	0	0	0	0	0	0	0	0	3	0	0
7	9	(England)	CF	Stephen Humphrys	3	0	0	0	0	0	0	0	0	0	0	0	3	0	0
11	4	(Scotland)	DF	Jimmy McNulty	1	0	1	0	0	0	0	0	0	0	0	0	1	0	1
11	10	(England)	CF	Alex Newby	1	0	0	0	0	0	0	0	0	1	0	0	2	0	0
11	16	(England)	MF	Matt Done	2	0	0	0	0	0	0	0	0	0	0	0	2	0	0
11	13	(Republic of Ireland)	MF	Jimmy Keohane	2	0	0	0	0	0	0	0	0	0	0	0	2	0	0
15	3	(England)	DF	Gabriel Osho	1	0	0	0	0	0	0	0	0	0	0	0	1	0	0
15	15	(England)	CB	Haydon Roberts	1	0	0	0	0	0	0	0	0	0	0	0	1	0	0
15	23	(England)	CM	Harrison Hopper	0	0	0	0	0	0	0	0	0	1	0	0	1	0	0
15	1	(Republic of Ireland)	GK	Gavin Bazunu	1	0	0	0	0	0	0	0	0	0	0	0	1	0	0
15	19	(Republic of Ireland)	MF	Connor Shaughnessy	0	0	1	0	0	0	0	0	0	0	0	0	0	0	1
15	12	(England)	GK	Jay Lynch	1	0	0	0	0	0	0	0	0	0	0	0	1	0	0
Total					62	0	3	0	0	0	2	0	0	6	0	0	70	0	3

== Transfers ==
=== Transfers in ===
Date	Pos.	Nat.	Name	From	Fee	Ref.
3 August 2020	CF	(England)	Alex Newby	(England) Chorley	Free transfer	
11 September 2020	CF	(England)	Stephen Humphrys	(England) Southend United	Undisclosed	
24 September 2020	CF	(England)	Jake Beesley	(England) Solihull Moors	Undisclosed	
1 February 2021	CM	(Republic of Ireland)	Conor Grant	(England) Sheffield Wednesday	Undisclosed	
1 February 2021	DM	(Republic of Ireland)	Conor Shaughnessy	(England) Leeds United	Free transfer	
26 February 2021	MF	(England)	Abraham Odoh	(England) Charlton Athletic	Free transfer	

=== Loans in ===
Date	Pos.	Nat.	Name	From	Till	Ref.
25 August 2020	GK	(Republic of Ireland)	Gavin Bazunu	(England) Manchester City	End of season	
7 September 2020	CB	(Ghana)	Yeboah Amankwah	(England) Manchester City	End of season	
8 October 2020	LB	(England)	Tolaji Bola	(England) Arsenal	31 January 2021	
19 October 2020	CB	(England)	Haydon Roberts	(England) Brighton & Hove Albion	End of season	
21 January 2021	CB	(England)	Gabriel Osho	(England) Luton Town	End of season	
1 February 2021	CF	(Wales)	Jack Vale	(England) Blackburn Rovers	End of season	

=== Loans out ===
Date	Pos.	Nat.	Name	To	Till	Ref.
3 September 2020	FW	(England)	Keaton Mulvey	(England) Mossley	December 2020	
19 September 2020	GK	(England)	Bradley Wade	(England) Guiseley	End of season	
26 September 2020	CM	(England)	Lewis Bradley	(England) Bradford (Park Avenue)	31 October 2020	

=== Transfers out ===
Date	Pos.	Nat.	Name	To	Fee	Ref.
1 July 2020	CF	(England)	Calvin Andrew	Unattached	Released	
1 July 2020	CM	(Northern Ireland)	Callum Camps	(England) Fleetwood Town	Released	
1 July 2020	CF	(England)	Matty Gillam	(England) Guiseley	Released	
1 July 2020	CF	(Northern Ireland)	Ian Henderson	(England) Salford City	Released	
1 July 2020	GK	(England)	Josh Lillis	(England) Barrow	Released	
1 July 2020	RB	(Northern Ireland)	Ryan McLaughlin	Unattached	Released	
1 July 2020	CF	(England)	Aaron Wilbraham	Unattached	Released	
1 July 2020	DM	(Wales)	Jordan Williams	(England) Blackpool	Released	
8 July 2020	RB	(Scotland)	John Stewart	(Gibraltar) Europa Point	Free transfer	
14 September 2020	CF	(England)	Morgan Moreland	(England) Ramsbottom United	Free transfer	
1 February 2021	CF	(England)	Fabio Tavares	(England) Coventry City	Undisclosed	

== Pre-season ==
Rochdale announced two pre-season friendlies against Atherton Collieries and Stockport County.

19 August 2020 Friendly	Atherton Collieries	1–4	Rochdale	Atherton
19:30 BST	Rokka 9' (pen.)	Report	Newby 2', 16'; Ryan 6'; Morley 61' (pen.)	Stadium: Skuna Stadium; Attendance: 0

22 August 2020 Friendly	Stockport County	0–2	Rochdale	Stockport
13:00 BST		Report	Lund 59'; Baah 90'	Stadium: Edgeley Park; Attendance: 0

25 August 2020 Friendly	Oldham Athletic	0–1	Rochdale	Oldham
13:00 BST		Report	Newby 63'	Stadium: Chapel Road; Attendance: 0

29 August 2020 Friendly	Port Vale	2–1	Rochdale	Stoke-on-Trent
15:00 BST	Conlon 45' (pen.), 56' (pen.)	Report	Morley 65' (pen.)	Stadium: Vale Park; Attendance: 0

== Competitions ==
=== EFL League One ===
==== League table ====
Pos	Team	Pld	W	D	L	GF	GA	GD	Pts	Promotion, qualification or relegation
17	Shrewsbury Town	46	13	15	18	50	57	−7	54	
18	Plymouth Argyle	46	14	11	21	53	80	−27	53	
19	AFC Wimbledon	46	12	15	19	54	70	−16	51	
20	Wigan Athletic	46	13	9	24	54	77	−23	48	
21	Rochdale (R)	46	11	14	21	61	78	−17	47	Relegation to EFL League Two
22	Northampton Town (R)	46	11	12	23	41	67	−26	45	Relegation to EFL League Two
23	Swindon Town (R)	46	13	4	29	55	89	−34	43	Relegation to EFL League Two
24	Bristol Rovers (R)	46	10	8	28	40	70	−30	38	Relegation to EFL League Two

Source: EFL Official Website
Rules for classification: 1) Points; 2) Goal difference; 3) Number of goals scored; 4) Head-to-head results; 5) Wins; 6) Away goals; 7) Penalty points (sec 9.5); 8) 12-point sending off offences
(R) Relegated

==== Results summary ====
Overall								Home						Away					
Pld	W	D	L	GF	GA	GD	Pts	W	D	L	GF	GA	GD	W	D	L	GF	GA	GD
46	11	14	21	61	78	−17	47	4	9	10	27	42	−15	7	5	11	34	36	−2

Last updated: 9 May 2021.
Source: BBC

==== Results by matchday ====
Matchday	1	2	3	4	5	6	7	8	9	10	11	12	13	14	15	16	17	18	19	20	21	22	23	24	25	26	27	28	29	30	31	32	33	34	35	36	37	38	39	40	41	42	43	44	45	46
Ground	A	H	A	H	A	H	A	A	H	H	A	H	H	A	H	A	A	H	H	A	H	A	A	H	A	H	H	A	H	A	H	A	A	H	A	H	A	H	A	H	H	H	A	A	H	A
Result	L	D	L	W	L	L	W	W	D	D	L	L	D	W	L	L	W	L	D	D	D	L	D	L	W	L	L	L	D	D	L	L	L	L	W	D	L	D	L	W	W	W	D	D	L	W
Position	19	21	23	17	18	23	17	15	14	14	16	20	20	17	18	20	16	18	21	20	18	18	18	18	18	18	18	19	18	18	20	23	24	24	22	24	24	24	24	24	22	22	22	21	21	21

Updated to match(es) played on 13 April 2021. Source: 11v11 for league tables and fixtures
A = Away; H = Home; W = Win; D = Draw; L = Loss

==== Matches ====
Win Draw Loss Postponed

The 2020–21 season fixtures were released on 21 August.

12 September 2020 1	Swindon Town	3–1	Rochdale	Swindon
15:00 BST	T. Smith 4'; Grant 33'; M. Smith 41'; Jaiyesimi (yellow card) 46'; Pitman (yellow card) 90'	Report	Lund (yellow card) 89'; Keohane 90+3'	Stadium: County Ground; Attendance: 0 Referee: Alan Young

20 September 2020 2	Rochdale	0–0	Portsmouth	Rochdale
15:00 BST	McShane (yellow card) 86'	Report	Brown (yellow card) 43'; Naylor (yellow card) 51'	Stadium: Spotland Stadium; Attendance: 0 Referee: Michael Salisbury

26 September 2020 3	Ipswich Town	2–0	Rochdale	Ipswich
15:00 BST	Bishop 53'; Edwards 59'; Nolan (yellow card) 65'	Report	Ryan (yellow card) 8'; O'Connell (yellow card) 50'	Stadium: Portman Road; Attendance: 0 Referee: John Busby

3 October 2020 4	Rochdale	2–1	Fleetwood Town	Rochdale
15:00 BST	Lund 13'; Beesley (yellow card) 39'; Tavares 90'	Report	Hill (yellow card) 54'; Saunders 77'; Evans (yellow card) 90+1'	Stadium: Spotland Stadium; Attendance: 0 Referee: James Oldham

10 October 2020 5	Accrington Stanley	2–1	Rochdale	Accrington
15:00 BST	Pritchard 64'; Russell 66'	Report	Keohane 54'	Stadium: Crown Ground; Attendance: 0 Referee: Scott Oldham

17 October 2020 6	Rochdale	0–3	Hull City	Rochdale
15:00 BST	Beesley (yellow card) 67'; Lund (yellow card) 81'	Report	Wilks 20', 73'; Magennis 75'	Stadium: Spotland Stadium; Attendance: 0 Referee: Gavin Ward

20 October 2020 7	Burton Albion	0–1	Rochdale	Burton
19:45 BST	O'Toole (yellow card) 35'	Report	Lund 49'; Roberts (yellow card) 50'	Stadium: Pirelli Stadium; Attendance: 0 Referee: Sam Purkiss

24 October 2020 8	Shrewsbury Town	1–2	Rochdale	Shrewsbury
15:00 BST	Vela (yellow card) 39'; Pierre 45+2' (yellow card) 86'; Fossey (yellow card) 59'	Report	Rathbone 22'; Newby 36'	Stadium: New Meadow; Attendance: 0 Referee: Carl Brook

27 October 2020 9	Rochdale	2–2	Sunderland	Rochdale
19:45 GMT	McLaughlin (yellow card) 21'; Lund 25', 44'; Ryan (yellow card) 63'; Rathbone (yellow card) 90+2'	Report	Wyke 15'; Wright 40'; Sanderson (yellow card) 79'	Stadium: Spotland Stadium; Attendance: 0 Referee: James Bell

31 October 2020 10	Rochdale	1–1	Bristol Rovers	Rochdale
15:00 GMT	Newby 25'; Rathbone (yellow card) 50'; Lund (yellow card) 80'; O'Connell (yellow card) 90'	Report	Nicholson 9'; Grant (yellow card) 34'	Stadium: Spotland Stadium; Attendance: 0 Referee: Steve Martin

3 November 2020 11	Oxford United	3–1	Rochdale	Oxford
19:00 GMT	Moore 35', 82'; Shodipo 58'; Henry (yellow card) 72'; Clare (yellow card) 90+5'	Report	Lund 42' (pen.); Ryan (yellow card) 45'; Rathbone (yellow card) 56'	Stadium: Kassam Stadium; Attendance: 0 Referee: David Rock

14 November 2020 P	Charlton Athletic	P–P	Rochdale	London
				Stadium: The Valley
Note: Postponed due to international call-ups for four Charlton Athletic players.

21 November 2020 12	Rochdale	0–1	Wimbledon	Rochdale
15:00 GMT		Report	Hartigan (yellow card) 30'; McLoughlin (yellow card) 72'; Chislett 90+2'	Stadium: Spotland Stadium; Attendance: 0 Referee: Declan Bourne

24 November 2020 13	Rochdale	1–1	Northampton Town	Rochdale
19:00 GMT	Humphrys 85'	Report	Smith 20'; Sowerby (yellow card) 79'	Stadium: Spotland Stadium; Attendance: 0 Referee: Andy Haines

1 December 2020 14	Plymouth Argyle	0–4	Rochdale	Plymouth
19:45 GMT		Report	Beesley 3'; Morley 23'; Keohane 45+12'; Humphrys 72'	Stadium: Home Park; Attendance: 0 Referee: Will Finnie

5 December 2020 15	Rochdale	0–2	Lincoln City	Rochdale
15:00 GMT	Lund (yellow card) 54'; O'Connell (yellow card) 90+2'	Report	Edun (yellow card) 14'; Jones 38'; Montsma 68'	Stadium: Spotland Stadium; Attendance: 0 Referee: Sam Allison

12 December 2020 16	Peterborough United	4–1	Rochdale	Peterborough
15:00 GMT	Clarke-Harris 5' (pen.), 10', 22'; Beevers (yellow card) 36'; Thompson 40' (yellow card) 45+1'	Report	Humphrys 9'	Stadium: London Road Stadium; Attendance: 0 Referee: Brett Huxtable

15 December 2020 17	Wigan Athletic	0–5	Rochdale	Wigan
19:00 GMT	Long (yellow card) 37'; Perry (yellow card) 45'; Tilt (yellow card) 55'; James (yellow card) 61'	Report	Baah 4'; Lund 19' (yellow card) 60'; Dooley (yellow card) 52' (goal) 58'; Newby 64' (pen.), 90+2'	Stadium: DW Stadium; Attendance: 0 Referee: Graham Salisbury

19 December 2020 18	Rochdale	1–4	Gillingham	Rochdale
13:00 GMT	O'Connell 90+2' (yellow card) 90+4'	Report	McKenzie 9'; Akinde 21', 47' (pen.); Ogilvie 45+1'	Stadium: Spotland Stadium; Attendance: 0 Referee: Ollie Yates

26 December 2020 P	Blackpool	P–P	Rochdale	Blackpool
				Stadium: Bloomfield Road
Note: Postponed due to positive Covid-19 cases.

29 December 2020 P	Rochdale	P–P	Crewe Alexandra	Rochdale
19:00 GMT				Stadium: Spotland Stadium
Note: Postponed due to positive Covid-19 cases.

2 January 2021 P	Milton Keynes Dons	P–P	Rochdale	Milton Keynes
				Stadium: Stadium MK
Note: Postponed due to positive Covid-19 cases.

9 January 2021 19	Rochdale	3–3	Crewe Alexandra	Rochdale
15:00 GMT	Lund (yellow card) 41' (goal) 60', 84'; Humphrys 47'	Report	Finney 6', 35'; Dale 23'	Stadium: Spotland Stadium; Attendance: 0 Referee: Andy Haines

12 January 2021 20	Charlton Athletic	4–4	Rochdale	London
19:00 GMT	Aneke 23', 65'; Pearce (yellow card) 29' (yellow-red card) 88'; Forster-Caskey 37'; Gilbey (yellow card) 40'; Schwartz 67'; Morgan (yellow card) 84'	Report	Lund 12'; Baah 21', 31'; Humphrys 42' (yellow card) 42'; Bazunu (yellow card) 69'	Stadium: The Valley; Attendance: 0 Referee: Trevor Kettle

16 January 2021 21	Rochdale	3–3	Wigan Athletic	Rochdale
15:00 GMT	Humphrys 7', 90+5'; McNulty (red card) 43'; Lund (yellow card) 48'; Beesley 58'	Report	Joseph 9'; Lang 16'; Perry (yellow card) 73'; Keane 77'	Stadium: Spotland Stadium; Attendance: 0 Referee: Bobby Madley

19 January 2021 22	Doncaster Rovers	1–0	Rochdale	Doncaster
19:00 GMT	Taylor 31'	Report	Baah (yellow card) 83'	Stadium: Keepmoat Stadium; Attendance: 0 Referee: Seb Stockbridge

23 January 2021 23	Gillingham	2–2	Rochdale	Gillingham
15:00 GMT	Oliver 43' (yellow card) 64'; Akinde 90+3'	Report	Lund (yellow card) 11'; Keohane 69', 75'; Baah (yellow card) 85'	Stadium: Priestfield Stadium; Attendance: 0 Referee: Christopher Pollard

26 January 2021 24	Rochdale	3–4	Oxford United	Rochdale
19:00 GMT	Done (yellow card) 6' (goal) 22'; Humphrys 30' (yellow card) 77'; Rathbone (yellow card) 48'; Lund 64'	Report	Agyei 12'; Moore 49'; Brannagan (yellow card) 60'; Henry 62'; Shodipo 90+2'	Stadium: Spotland Stadium; Attendance: 0 Referee: Ross Joyce

30 January 2021 25	Bristol Rovers	1–2	Rochdale	Bristol
15:00 GMT	Leahy 34'	Report	Newby 16', 64'; Dooley (yellow card) 75'	Stadium: Memorial Stadium; Attendance: 0 Referee: Declan Bourne

6 February 2021 26	Rochdale	0–2	Charlton Athletic	Rochdale
15:00 GMT	O'Connell (yellow card) 72'	Report	Aneke 7'; Oshilaja 27'; Gunter (yellow card) 60'	Stadium: Spotland Stadium; Attendance: 0 Referee: Thomas Bramall

9 February 2021 27	Rochdale	1–4	Milton Keynes Dons	Rochdale
19:00 GMT	O'Connell (yellow card) 30'; Lund 39' (yellow card) 65'	Report	O'Riley 5'; Jules 55'; Fraser 58'; Jerome 62'	Stadium: Spotland Stadium; Attendance: 0 Referee: Carl Boyeson

13 February 2021 P	Wimbledon	P–P	Rochdale	Wimbledon
				Stadium: Plough Lane
Note: Postponed due to a frozen pitch.

16 February 2021 28	Blackpool	1–0	Rochdale	Blackpool
19:00 GMT	Kaikai 21'	Report		Stadium: Bloomfield Road; Attendance: 0 Referee: Anthony Backhouse

20 February 2021 29	Rochdale	0–0	Plymouth Argyle	Rochdale
15:00 GMT	McShane (yellow card) 18'; Baah (yellow card) 22'; McLaughlin (yellow card) 90'	Report	Opoku (yellow card) 47'	Stadium: Spotland Stadium; Attendance: 0 Referee: Peter Wright

23 February 2021 30	Northampton Town	0–0	Rochdale	Northampton
19:00 GMT	Kioso (yellow card) 56'; McWilliams (yellow card) 75'; Sheehan (yellow card) 90+4'	Report		Stadium: Sixfields Stadium; Attendance: 0 Referee: Kevin Johnson

27 February 2021 31	Rochdale	0–2	Burton Albion	Rochdale
15:00 GMT	Baah (yellow card) 40'; Rathbone (red card) 77'; O'Connell (yellow card) 90+2'	Report	Hemmings 65'; Clare (yellow card) 75'; Smith (yellow card) 78'; Akins 86'	Stadium: Spotland Stadium; Attendance: 0 Referee: Marc Edwards

2 March 2021 32	Hull City	2–0	Rochdale	Hull
19:00 GMT	Wilks 24'; Osho 69' (o.g.); Slater (yellow card) 86'	Report	McShane (yellow card) 72'; Shaughnessy (red card) 77'	Stadium: KCOM Stadium; Attendance: 0 Referee: James Bell

6 March 2021 33	Sunderland	2–0	Rochdale	Sunderland
15:00 GMT	Sanderson 7'; McFadzean (yellow card) 14'; Wyke 35'; Jones (yellow card) 45+1'	Report	McLaughlin (yellow card) 6'; Baah (yellow card) 58'; Newby (yellow card) 90+9'	Stadium: Stadium of Light; Attendance: 0 Referee: Ross Joyce

9 March 2021 34	Rochdale	0–2	Shrewsbury Town	Rochdale
19:00 GMT	McShane (yellow card) 26'; Baah (yellow card) 72'	Report	Williams (yellow card) 19'; Daniels 55'; Vela 64'	Stadium: Spotland Stadium; Attendance: 0 Referee: Martin Coy

13 March 2021 35	Lincoln City	1–2	Rochdale	Lincoln
15:00 GMT	Rogers 60'	Report	Rathbone 36'; Humphrys 74'	Stadium: Sincil Bank; Attendance: 0 Referee: Antony Coggins

20 March 2021 36	Rochdale	3–3	Peterborough United	Rochdale
15:00 GMT	Humphrys 55' (pen.); Rathbone (yellow card) 58'; Beesley 87'; Keohane 90'; Baah (yellow card) 90+5'	Report	Dembélé 5'; Szmodics 45+1'; Kent (yellow card) 77'; Clarke-Harris 90+3' (pen.)	Stadium: Spotland Stadium; Attendance: 0 Referee: David Rock

2 April 2021 37	Portsmouth	2–1	Rochdale	Portsmouth
15:00 GMT	Williams 5' (yellow card) 76'; Curtis 37'	Report	Keohane (yellow card) 24'; Beesley 90+3'	Stadium: Fratton Park; Attendance: 0 Referee: Lee Swabey

6 April 2021 38	Rochdale	0–0	Ipswich Town	Rochdale
15:00 GMT		Report	Harrop (yellow card) 89'	Stadium: Spotland Stadium; Attendance: 0 Referee: Robert Lewis

10 April 2021 39	Fleetwood Town	1–0	Rochdale	Fleetwood
15:00 GMT	O'Connell 52' (o.g.); Connolly (yellow card) 66'	Report	McLaughlin (yellow card) 54'	Stadium: Highbury Stadium; Attendance: 0 Referee: Bobby Madley

13 April 2021 40	Rochdale	2–1	Swindon Town	Rochdale
19:00 BST	Keohane 11'; Grant 64'; Osho (yellow card) 74'	Report	Garrick 88'	Stadium: Spotland Stadium; Attendance: 0 Referee: Sam Allison

17 April 2021 41	Rochdale	3–1	Accrington Stanley	Rochdale
12:30 BST	Keohane 10'; McLaughlin (yellow card) 29'; Beesley 66' (yellow card) 90+5'; Shaughnessy 90+1'	Report	Barclay 13' (yellow card) 46'; Smyth (yellow card) 22'; Burgess (yellow card) 90'	Stadium: Spotland Stadium; Attendance: 0 Referee: Scott Oldham

20 April 2021 42	Rochdale	1–0	Blackpool	Rochdale
19:00 BST	Rathbone 69' (yellow card) 90'; Lund (yellow card) 70'; Lynch (yellow card) 90+4'	Report	Ward (yellow card) 66'	Stadium: Spotland Stadium; Attendance: 0 Referee: Craig Hicks

24 April 2021 43	Crewe Alexandra	1–1	Rochdale	Crewe
15:00 BST	Evans (yellow card) 52'; Kirk 90'	Report	O'Connell (yellow card) 90'; Done 90+7'	Stadium: Gresty Road; Attendance: 0 Referee: Andy Haines

27 April 2021 44	Wimbledon	3–3	Rochdale	Wimbledon
19:00 BST	O'Neill (yellow card) 13'; Rudoni 61'; Palmer 66'; Pigott 90+7'	Report	Beesley 41'; Osho 57'; Done (yellow card) 71'; Keohane 73'; McNulty (yellow card) 85'; Humphrys (yellow card) 90+3'	Stadium: Plough Lane; Attendance: 0 Referee: Carl Brook

1 May 2021 45	Rochdale	1–2	Doncaster Rovers	Rochdale
15:00 BST	Rathbone (yellow card) 54'; Done 83'; Keohane (yellow card) 90+3'	Report	Richards 30', 56'	Stadium: Spotland Stadium; Attendance: 0 Referee: Seb Stockbridge

9 May 2021 46	Milton Keynes Dons	0–3	Rochdale	Milton Keynes
12:00 BST	Kasumu (yellow card) 23'	Report	Morley 46'; Keohane 50'; Humphrys 85'	Stadium: Stadium MK; Attendance: 0 Referee: Tim Robinson

=== FA Cup ===
The draw for the first round was made on Monday 26, October.

Win Draw Loss

7 November 2020 First round	Rochdale	1–2	Stockport County	Rochdale
15:00 GMT	Lund 22'	Report	Rooney 7'; Reid 14'	Stadium: Spotland Stadium; Attendance: 0 Referee: Scott Oldham

=== EFL Cup ===
Win Draw Loss

The first round draw was made on 18 August, live on Sky Sports, by Paul Merson. The draw for both the second and third round were confirmed on September 6, live on Sky Sports by Phil Babb.

5 September 2020 First round	Huddersfield Town	0–1	Rochdale	Huddersfield
15:00 BST		Report	O'Connell 51'	Stadium: The John Smith's Stadium; Attendance: 0 Referee: Ben Toner

15 September 2020 Second round	Rochdale	0–2	Sheffield Wednesday	Rochdale
19:45 BST	O'Connell (yellow card) 45+1'; Rathbone (yellow card) 90+2'	Report	Pelupessy (yellow card) 34'; Kachunga 54'; Hunt (yellow card) 57'; Reach (yellow card) 64'; Windass 88'	Stadium: Crown Oil Arena; Referee: Seb Stockbridge

=== EFL Trophy ===
Win Draw Loss

The regional group stage draw was confirmed on 18 August.

Pos	Div	Team	Pld	W	PW	PL	L	GF	GA	GD	Pts	Qualification
1	L2	Salford City	3	2	0	0	1	4	7	−3	6	Advance to Round 2
2	ACA	Manchester United U21	3	1	1	0	1	6	4	+2	5	Advance to Round 2
3	L1	Rochdale	3	1	0	1	1	3	3	0	4	
4	L2	Morecambe	3	1	0	0	2	5	4	+1	3	

Source: EFL.com

8 September 2020 Group stage	Morecambe	1–2	Rochdale	Morecambe
19:45 BST	Lavelle 23' (yellow card) 55'; O'Sullivan (yellow card) 61'	Report	Tavares 86'; Newby 90+3'	Stadium: Mazuma Stadium; Attendance: 0 Referee: Sam Barrott

29 September 2020 Group stage	Rochdale	0–0 (4–5 p)	Manchester United U21	Rochdale
19:45 BST	Lund (yellow card) 27'; Done (yellow card) 65'; Newby (yellow card) 80'; Hopper (yellow card) 85'	Report		Stadium: Spotland Stadium; Attendance: 0 Referee: Martin Coy
	Penalties
	Morley (penalty missed); Newby (penalty scored); Tavares (penalty scored); Keohane (penalty scored); Rathbone (penalty scored); Hopper (penalty missed)		Mejbri (penalty scored); McCann (penalty scored); Wellens (penalty missed); Hansen-Aaroen (penalty scored); Elanga (penalty scored); Hugill (penalty scored)

10 November 2020 Group stage	Rochdale	1–2	Salford City	Rochdale
19:00 GMT	Beesley 8'; Rathbone (yellow card) 80'; O'Connell (yellow card) 90+2'	Report	Andrade 53'; Golden (yellow card) 57'; Dieseruvwe 82' (pen.); Burgess (yellow card) 90+4'	Stadium: Spotland Stadium; Attendance: 0 Referee: Bobby Madley
