= Danny Cashman =

English footballer (born 2001)

Personal information
- Full name: Danny Christopher Cashman
- Date of birth: 8 January 2001 (age 25)
- Place of birth: Crawley, England
- Height: 1.70 m (5 ft 7 in)
- Position: Forward

Team information
- Current team: Boreham Wood (on loan from Crawley Town)
- Number: 9

Youth career
- 2012–2021: Brighton & Hove Albion

Senior career*
Years	Team	Apps	(Gls)
2021–2023	Coventry City	0	(0)
2021–2022	→ Rochdale (loan)	23	(2)
2022–2023	→ Walsall (loan)	7	(0)
2023	→ Altrincham (loan)	7	(0)
2023–2025	Worthing	79	(28)
2025–	Crawley Town	5	(0)
2026	→ Sutton United (loan)	2	(0)
2026–	→ Boreham Wood (loan)	5	(2)

International career
2016–2017	England U16	6	(1)
2017	England U17	2	(0)
- * Club domestic league appearances and goals as of 16:08, 31 August 2026 (UTC)

Danny Christopher Cashman (born 8 January 2001) is an English professional footballer who plays as a forward for Boreham Wood on loan from EFL League Two club Crawley Town.

== Club career ==
Born in Crawley, Cashman joined Brighton & Hove Albion in 2012, and captained their under-18 team. On 6 August 2021, he signed for Coventry City, and was immediately loaned to Rochdale.

On 1 September 2022, Cashman returned to EFL League Two to join Walsall on loan until the end of the 2022–23 season. On 16 January 2023, Cashman returned to Coventry City after being recalled from his loan stay with Walsall.

On 31 January, he joined National League club Altrincham until the end of the season. He was recalled by Coventry on 22 March.

On 1 September 2023 Cashman left Coventry City by mutual consent. A few days later on 4 September, Cashman signed for National League club Worthing. He declined the offer of a new contract at the end of the 2024–25 season.

On 19 June 2025, Cashman returned to his hometown, signing a two-year deal with EFL League Two side Crawley Town. In March 2026, having failed to make an appearance in six months due to injury, he joined National League club Sutton United on loan for the remainder of the season.

In August 2026 he signed on loan for Boreham Wood.

== International career ==
Cashman represented England at under-16 and under-17 levels.

== Career statistics ==
As of match played 18 October 2025

Appearances and goals by club, season and competition
Club	Season	League			FA Cup		League Cup		Other		Total	
Club	Season	Division	Apps	Goals	Apps	Goals	Apps	Goals	Apps	Goals	Apps	Goals
Brighton & Hove Albion U21	2017–18	Professional Development League	—						1 (Note: Appearance(s) in the EFL Trophy)	0	1	0
Brighton & Hove Albion U21	2018–19	Professional Development League	—						1	0	1	0
Brighton & Hove Albion U21	2019–20	Professional Development League	—						4	1	4	1
Brighton & Hove Albion U21	2020–21	Professional Development League	—						3	0	3	0
Brighton & Hove Albion U21	Total		0	0	0	0	0	0	9	1	9	1
Coventry City	2021–22	Championship	0	0	0	0	0	0	—		0	0
Coventry City	2022–23	Championship	0	0	0	0	0	0	—		0	0
Coventry City	Total		0	0	0	0	0	0	0	0	0	0
Rochdale (loan)	2021–22	League Two	23	2	1	0	2	1	3	0	29	3
Walsall (loan)	2022–23	League Two	7	0	1	0	0	0	2	0	10	0
Altrincham (loan)	2022–23	National League	7	0	0	0	0	0	1 (Note: Appearance in the FA Trophy)	0	8	0
Worthing	2023–24	National League South	35	12	4	2	—		3 (Note: One appearance in the FA Trophy, two appearances and one goal in the National League South play-offs)	1	42	15
Worthing	2024–25	National League South	44	16	4	2	—		5 (Note: Four appearances and two goals in the FA Trophy, one appearance in the National League South play-offs)	2	53	20
Worthing	Total		79	28	8	4	0	0	8	3	95	35
Crawley Town	2025–26	League Two	5	0	0	0	0	0	0	0	5	0
Career total			121	30	10	4	2	1	23	4	156	39

== Honours ==
Individual

- National League South Team of the Season: 2024–25
