= Max Taylor (footballer) =

English footballer (born 2000)

Personal information
- Full name: Max Edward Taylor
- Date of birth: 10 January 2000 (age 26)
- Place of birth: Manchester, England
- Height: 1.88 m (6 ft 2 in)
- Position: Defender

Team information
- Current team: AFC Fylde
- Number: 5

Youth career
- 2014–2019: Manchester United

Senior career*
Years	Team	Apps	(Gls)
2019–2021	Manchester United	0	(0)
2020	→ Stalybridge Celtic (loan)	7	(0)
2020–2021	→ Kidderminster Harriers (loan)	9	(1)
2021–2024	Rochdale	55	(4)
2024	→ Solihull Moors (loan)	3	(0)
2024–2025	Morecambe	20	(1)
2025–	AFC Fylde	0	(0)
- * Club domestic league appearances and goals as of 13:31, 22 July 2025 (UTC)

Max Edward Taylor (born 10 January 2000) is an English professional footballer who plays as a defender for National League club AFC Fylde.

== Early and personal life ==
Born in Manchester, Taylor was known as Max Dunne until February 2019.

In June 2018, Taylor was diagnosed with and underwent treatment for testicular cancer, returning to training with Manchester United in September 2019.

== Career ==
Taylor joined Manchester United at the age of 14. He signed his first professional contract at the start of 2018, five months before his cancer diagnosis.

He received his first call-up to the senior team in November 2019. He was given squad number 52.

In January 2020 he moved on loan to Stalybridge Celtic, making 9 appearances in all competitions.

In May 2020 he signed a new one-year contract with the club. In August 2020 he went on trial to Milton Keynes Dons with a view to a loan move.

In October 2020 he moved on loan to Kidderminster Harriers.

On 4 June 2021 it was announced that he was being released by Manchester United and would leave the club at the end of the season following the expiry of his contract.

Taylor signed for Rochdale in August 2021. He scored his first goal for the club in a 3–1 win against Northampton Town on 21 August 2021. He signed a new contract with Rochdale in August 2022.

In March 2024, he joined fellow National League club Solihull Moors on a one-month loan deal.

Taylor was released by Rochdale at the end of the 2023–24 season.

Taylor signed for Morecambe in July 2024.

In July 2025, Taylor joined National League North side AFC Fylde.

== Career statistics ==
As of end of 2024–25 season

Appearances and goals by club, season and competition
Club	Season	League			FA Cup		League Cup		Other		Total	
Club	Season	Division	Apps	Goals	Apps	Goals	Apps	Goals	Apps	Goals	Apps	Goals
Manchester United U23	2019–20	—			—		—		1 (Note: Appearance(s) in EFL Trophy)	0	1	0
Manchester United U23	2020–21	—			—		—		1	0	1	0
Manchester United U23	Total				—		—		2	0	2	0
Stalybridge Celtic (loan)	2019–20	NPL Premier Division	7	0	—		—		2 (Note: One appearance in Cheshire Senior Cup, one appearance in Northern Premier League Challenge Cup)	0	9	0
Kidderminster Harriers (loan)	2020–21	National League North	9	1	0	0	—		0	0	9	1
Rochdale	2021–22	League Two	22	3	2	0	2	0	3	0	29	3
Rochdale	2022–23	League Two	19	1	0	0	0	0	1	0	20	1
Rochdale	2023–24	National League	14	0	0	0	—		1 (Note: Appearance(s) in FA Trophy)	0	15	0
Rochdale	Total		55	4	2	0	2	0	5	0	64	4
Solihull Moors (loan)	2023–24	National League	3	0	0	0	—		0	0	3	0
Morecambe	2024–25	League Two	20	1	1	0	1	0	3	0	25	1
Career total			94	6	3	0	3	0	12	0	112	6
