= Joe Dunne (footballer, born 2001) =

English footballer

Personal information
- Full name: Joseph William Dunne
- Date of birth: 25 October 2001 (age 25)
- Place of birth: Stafford, England
- Height: 6 ft 0 in (1.83 m)
- Position: Centre-back

Team information
- Current team: Chasetown

Youth career
- –2019: Rochdale

Senior career*
Years	Team	Apps	(Gls)
2019–2022	Rochdale	0	(0)
2021–2022	→ Stafford Rangers (loan)	20	(0)
2022–2023	Stafford Rangers	0	(0)
- * Club domestic league appearances and goals as of 16:44, 18 June 2022 (UTC)

Joseph William Dunne (born 25 October 2001) is an English professional footballer who plays as a centre-back for Stafford Rangers.

== Career ==
Dunne was born in Stafford.

Dunne made his debut for Rochdale on 12 November 2019, starting in a 2–1 away victory against Bradford City. In March 2020, Dunne joined Matlock Town on a work experience spell.

On 9 December 2021, Dunne joined Northern Premier League Premier Division side Stafford Rangers on a one-month loan deal. Dunne joined Stafford Rangers on a permanent basis in June 2022 following his release from Rochdale.

== Career statistics ==
As of match played 31 August 2021

Appearances and goals by club, season and competition
Club	Season	League			FA Cup		League Cup		Other		Total	
Club	Season	Division	Apps	Goals	Apps	Goals	Apps	Goals	Apps	Goals	Apps	Goals
Rochdale	2019–20	League One	0	0	0	0	0	0	1 (Note: Appearance(s) in the Football League Trophy)	0	1	0
Rochdale	2020–21	League One	0	0	0	0	0	0	2	0	2	0
Rochdale	2021–22	League One	0	0	0	0	0	0	1	0	1	0
Career total			0	0	0	0	0	0	4	0	4	0
