= Jake Beesley =

English footballer (born 1996)

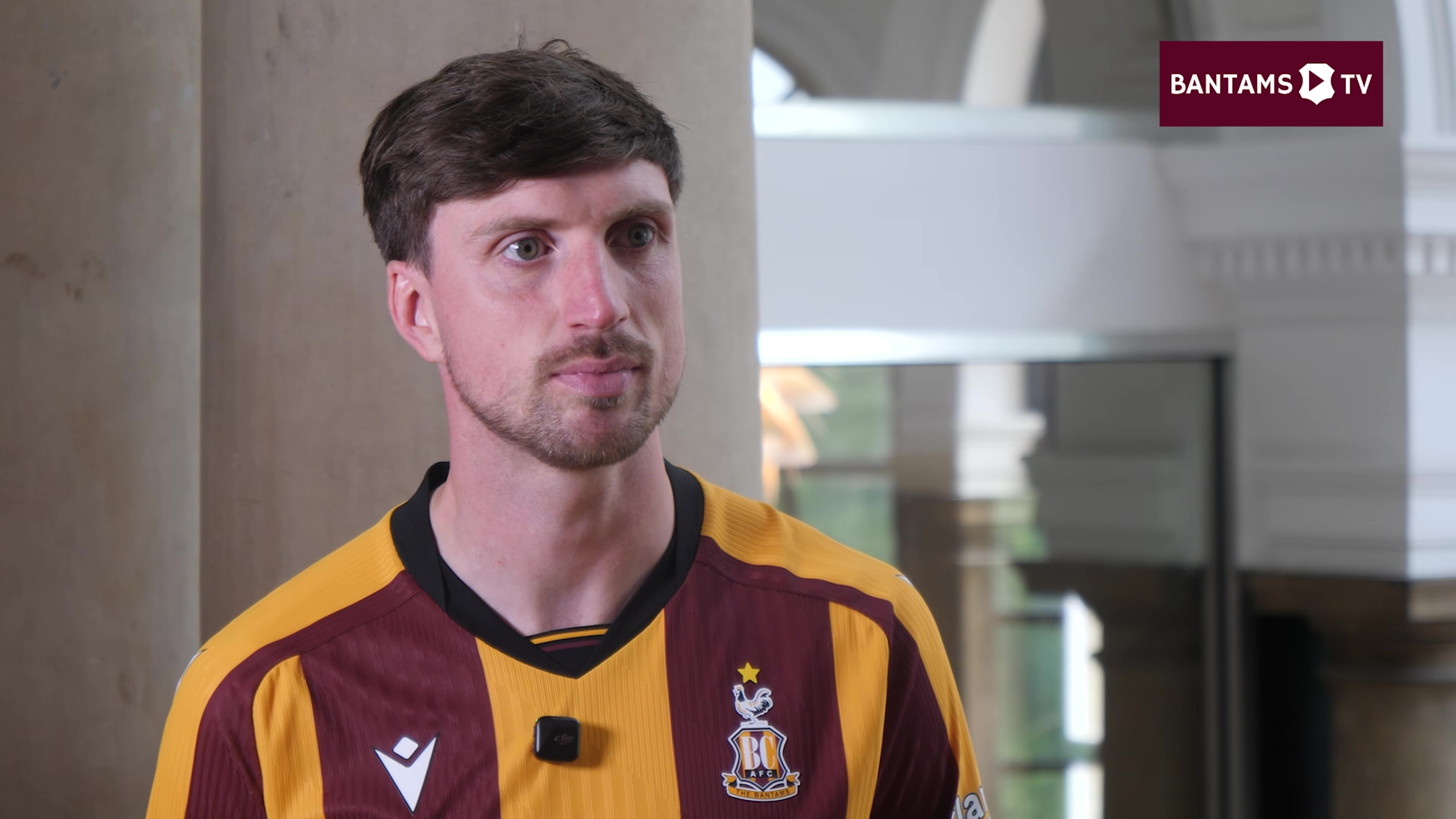
- Beesley with Bradford City in 2026

Personal information
- Full name: Jake Elliott Beesley
- Date of birth: 2 December 1996 (age 29)
- Place of birth: Sheffield, England
- Height: 6 ft 1 in (1.85 m)
- Position: Forward

Team information
- Current team: Bradford City
- Number: 9

Youth career
- –2014: Chesterfield

Senior career*
Years	Team	Apps	(Gls)
2014–2017	Chesterfield	7	(0)
2016	→ Shaw Lane (loan)	6	(4)
2017–2020	Salford City	28	(4)
2018	→ Boston United (loan)	11	(1)
2018–2019	→ Bradford Park Avenue (loan)	43	(21)
2019–2020	→ Solihull Moors (loan)	14	(4)
2020	Solihull Moors	9	(0)
2020–2022	Rochdale	48	(15)
2022–2025	Blackpool	62	(10)
2025–2026	Burton Albion	42	(13)
2026–	Bradford City	8	(1)
- * Club domestic league appearances and goals as of 4th October 2026 (UTC)

Jake Elliott Beesley (born 2 December 1996) is an English professional footballer who plays as a forward for EFL League One club Bradford City.

He began his career at Chesterfield, progressing through the youth ranks and making his first-team debut in 2014. After seven Football League appearances over three years, partly spent on loan at Shaw Lane, he joined Salford City in 2017. After loan spells at Boston United and Bradford Park Avenue, he was loaned to Solihull Moors before joining on a permanent basis in 2020. His stay there was short, with Rochdale signing him for an undisclosed fee the same year. He joined Championship club Blackpool in January 2022.

== Career ==
Beesley made his professional debut for Chesterfield on 2 September 2014 in a Football League Trophy match against Scunthorpe United, after coming off the bench to replace Charlie Dawes in the 74th minute.

Beesley signed on loan for Shaw Lane in October 2016 for a month. He made his début against Loughborough Dynamo on 16 October in a 3–0. At the end of his loan spell, Shaw Lane manager Craig Elliott praised Beesley, saying he had earned the chance to play in the Chesterfield first team with his performances. He made his league debut on 19 November 2016, in a 2–1 defeat to Fleetwood Town.

=== Salford City ===
In June 2017 he joined Salford City, signing a two-year contract. On 17 August 2019, Beesley scored his first goal in the Football League when he scored a 93rd minute equaliser in a 1–1 draw with Port Vale. He scored again three days later, scoring the opening goal of an eventual 2–2 draw with Plymouth Argyle.

==== Loan moves ====
In March 2018 Beesley was reunited with former Shaw Lane manager Elliott when he was loaned to Boston United, initially for a month, and was later extended until the end of the season.

In July 2018 he joined Bradford (Park Avenue) on a season-long loan. He was seen as a replacement for top goalscorer Adam Boyes who had signed for Spennymoor Town. Manager Mark Bower praised Beesley for his impact on the team at the start of the season. On 8 August, he scored his first two goals for the club in a 2–1 victory against Blyth Spartans. On Boxing Day, Beesley scored a hat-trick against Guiseley in a 5–1 win to keep Bradford (Park Avenue) top of the table.

In October 2019, having failed to make an appearance in six consecutive games, he joined Solihull Moors on loan until January 2020. On 8 October, Beesley scored on his Solihull début, opening the scoring in the 20th minute of a 2–0 win against Sutton United.

=== Solihull Moors ===
In January 2020 he joined Solihull on a permanent deal.

=== Rochdale ===
On 24 September 2020, Beesley signed a three-year deal with Rochdale for an undisclosed fee. He scored his first goal for Rochdale on 10 November 2020 in an EFL Trophy group game against Salford City. After registering four goals and an assist in just three games across the course of the month, Beesley was awarded the EFL League Two Player of the Month award for December 2021.

=== Blackpool ===
On 10 January 2022, Beesley joined Blackpool in a three-and-a-half-year deal, for an undisclosed fee, with the club having an option to extend it for a further twelve months. He made his first start for the club on 18 April, scoring two goals in a 6–1 win against Birmingham City.

=== Burton Albion ===
On 25 June 2025, Beesley joined League One side Burton Albion on an initial two-year deal for an undisclosed fee.

=== Bradford City ===
On 2 June 2026 it was announced that Beesley would sign for Bradford City on 1 July 2026 for an undisclosed fee, on a two-year contract.

== Personal life ==
Beesley's father, Paul, was also a footballer, playing at centre-back.

== Career stats ==
As of match played 22 January 2026

Club statistics
Club	Season	League			FA Cup		League Cup		Other		Total	
Club	Season	Division	Apps	Goals	Apps	Goals	Apps	Goals	Apps	Goals	Apps	Goals
Chesterfield	2014–15	League One	0	0	0	0	0	0	1 (Note: Appearance in Football League Trophy)	0	1	0
Chesterfield	2015–16	League One	0	0	0	0	0	0	0	0	0	0
Chesterfield	2016–17	League One	7	0	1	0	0	0	2	0	10	0
Total			7	0	1	0	0	0	3	0	11	0
Salford City	2017–18	National League North	24	2	0	0	—		1 (Note: Appearance(s) in FA Trophy)	0	25	2
Salford City	2018–19	National League	0	0	0	0	—		0	0	0	0
Salford City	2019–20	League Two	7	2	0	0	1	0	0	0	8	2
Salford City	Total		31	4	0	0	1	0	1	0	33	4
Boston United (loan)	2017–18	National League North	11	1	0	0	—		0	0	11	1
Solihull Moors (loan)	2019–20	National League	23	4	3	0	—		3 (Note: Two appearances and one goal in FA Trophy and one appearance in Scottish Challenge Cup)	1	29	5
Solihull Moors	2020–21	National League	0	0	0	0	—		0	0	0	0
Solihull Moors	Total		34	5	3	0	0	0	3	1	40	6
Rochdale	2020–21	League One	27	6	1	0	0	0	2 (Note: Appearance(s) in EFL Trophy)	0	30	7
Rochdale	2021–22	League Two	21	9	3	1	2	2	0	0	26	12
Rochdale	Total		48	15	4	1	2	2	2	0	58	18
Blackpool	2021–22	Championship	6	2	0	0	0	0	0	0	6	2
Blackpool	2022–23	Championship	5	0	1	0	—		—		6	0
Blackpool	2023–24	League One	29	7	2	0	2	2	4	3	37	12
Blackpool	2024–25	League One	22	1	1	0	3	1	2	0	28	2
Blackpool	Total		62	10	4	0	5	3	6	3	77	16
Burton Albion	2025–26	League One	25	9	1	0	0	0	—		26	9
Career total			207	43	13	1	8	5	15	4	245	73
