= Harrison Hopper =

English association football player

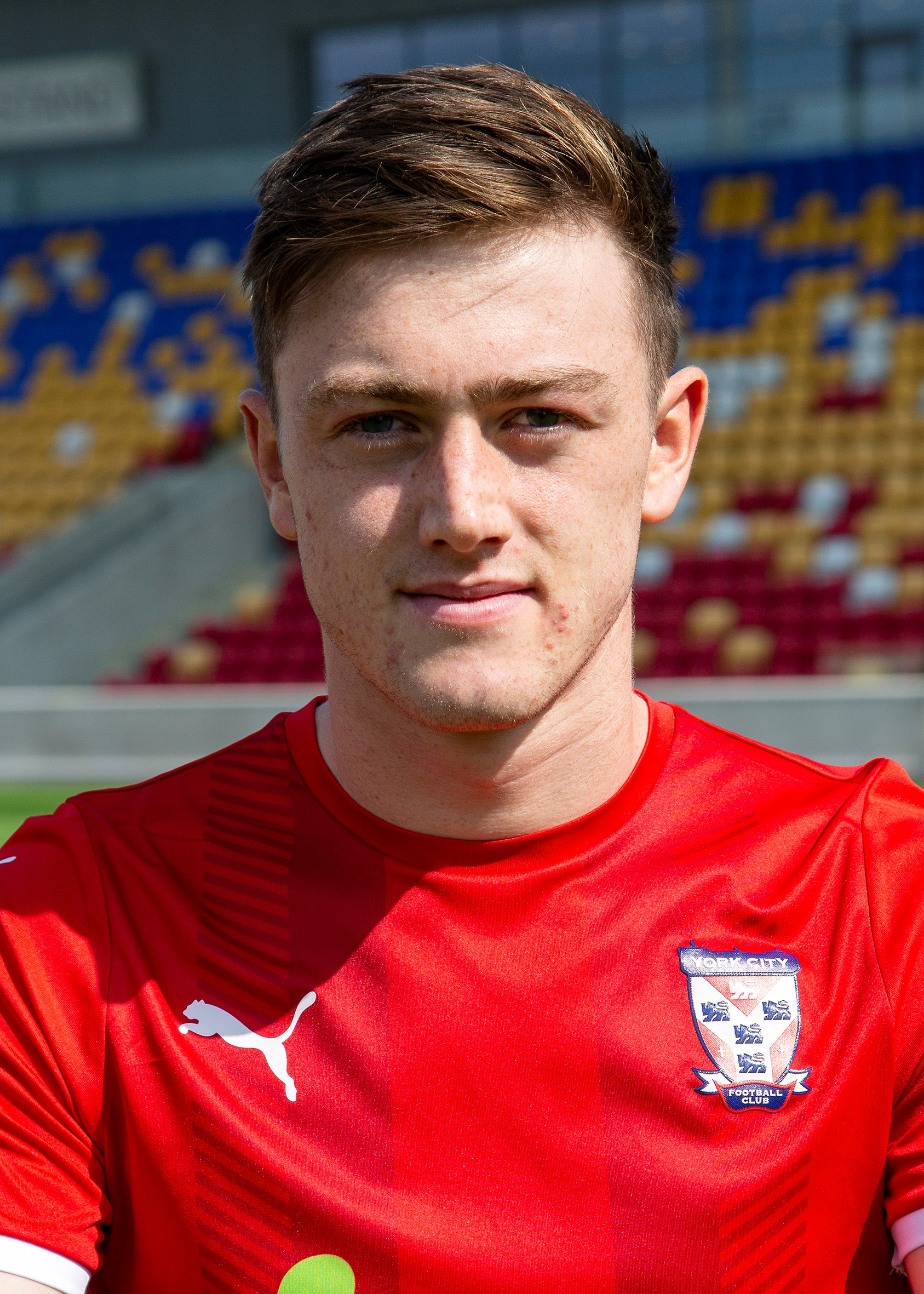
- Hopper with York City in 2021

Personal information
- Full name: Harrison George Hopper
- Date of birth: 24 December 2000 (age 25)
- Place of birth: Camden, England
- Height: 5 ft 9 in (1.75 m)
- Position: Midfielder

Team information
- Current team: Guiseley

Youth career
- –2018: Rochdale

Senior career*
Years	Team	Apps	(Gls)
2018–2021	Rochdale	2	(0)
2020	→ Colne (loan)		
2021–2022	York City	11	(0)
2022–2024	Bradford (Park Avenue)	87	(7)
2024–2025	Warrington Rylands	31	(2)
2025–	Guiseley	0	(0)
- * Club domestic league appearances and goals as of 11:54, 2 July 2025 (UTC)

Harrison George Hopper (born 24 December 2000) is an English professional footballer who plays as a midfielder for Northern Premier League Premier Division club Guiseley

== Career ==
On 7 November 2018, after graduating from Rochdale's academy, Hopper made his debut for the club in a 2–2 EFL Trophy draw against Leicester City U21. On 23 November 2019, Hopper made his league debut for the club in a 3–0 defeat against Portsmouth.

In February 2020 he joined Colne on loan.

Following his release from Rochdale, he signed for National League North side York City, the city he was raised in, following a successful trial period.

On 22 January 2022, Hopper signed an 18-month contract with National League North side Bradford (Park Avenue).

On 1 July 2025, Hopper joined Northern Premier League Premier Division side Guiseley.
