= Trinity Catholic High School =

Trinity Catholic High School may refer to:

- Trinity Catholic High School, Woodford Green, London
- Trinity Catholic High School (Connecticut), in Stamford, Connecticut
- Trinity Catholic High School (Florida), in Ocala, Florida
- Trinity Catholic High School (Kansas), in Hutchinson, Kansas
- Trinity Catholic High School (Massachusetts), in Newton, Massachusetts
- Trinity Catholic High School (Michigan) in Harper Woods, Michigan
- Trinity Catholic High School (St. Louis) in St. Louis, Missouri

== See also ==
- Trinity Christian High School (disambiguation)
- Trinity High School (disambiguation)
- Trinity College (disambiguation)
