= Trinity High School =

Trinity High School is the name of a number of schools:

== United Kingdom ==
- Trinity High School, Renfrew, Renfrewshire, Scotland
- Trinity High School, Rutherglen, Lanarkshire, Scotland
- Trinity High School and Sixth Form Centre, in Redditch, England
- Trinity Church of England High School, in Manchester, England

== United States ==
- Trinity School (Athens, Alabama), closed 1970 in the wake of desegregation
- Trinity High School (Weaverville, California)
- Trinity Catholic High School (Connecticut)
- Trinity High School (River Forest, Illinois)
- Trinity Catholic High School (Kansas)
- Trinity High School (Louisville), Kentucky
- Trinity High School (Whitesville, Kentucky)
- Trinity Catholic High School (Missouri), St. Louis County, Missouri
- Trinity High School (Manchester, New Hampshire)
- Trinity High School (Trinity, North Carolina)
- Trinity High School (Dickinson, North Dakota)
- Trinity High School (Garfield Heights, Ohio)
- Trinity High School (Camp Hill, Pennsylvania)
- Trinity High School (Washington, Pennsylvania)
- Trinity High School (Euless, Texas)
- Trinity High School in Trinity Independent School District, Texas
- Trinity Christian School (Morgantown, West Virginia)

== See also ==
- Trinity School (disambiguation)
- Trinity College (disambiguation)
- Trinity Christian High School (disambiguation)
- Trinity Episcopal School (disambiguation)
