= Trinity Catholic College =

Trinity Catholic College may refer to:

- Trinity Catholic College, Auburn, a school in Greater Western Sydney, New South Wales, Australia
- Trinity Catholic College, Dunedin, a school in Dunedin, New Zealand
- Trinity Catholic College, Goulburn, a school in New South Wales, Australia
- Trinity Catholic College, Lismore, a school in New South Wales, Australia
- Trinity Catholic College, Middlesbrough, a school in North Yorkshire, England

== See also ==
- Trinity Catholic School
- Trinity College (disambiguation)
