= Lewis Bradley =

Lewis Bradley may refer to:

- Lewis R. Bradley (1805–1879), governor of Nevada
- Lewis Bradley (footballer) (born 2001), English footballer
- Lewis Bradley (rugby) (1889–1918), English rugby union and rugby league player
