= Louie Clarkson =

English footballer

Personal information
- Date of birth: Louie James Clarkson
- Position: Midfielder

Youth career
- 2019: Rochdale

Senior career*
Years	Team	Apps	(Gls)
2019–2021	Rochdale	0	(0)
- * Club domestic league appearances and goals as of 21:06, 27 April 2026 (UTC)

Louie James Clarkson is an English professional footballer who last played as a midfielder for EFL League Two club Rochdale.

== Career ==
Having joined Rochdale's youth team in 2019, he made his first team debut for Rochdale on 12 November 2019, coming on as an 80th minute substitute for Lewis Bradley in a 2–1 EFL Trophy victory away to Bradford City.

== Career statistics ==
As of 19 March 2020

Appearances and goals by club, season and competition
Club	Season	League			FA Cup		League Cup		Other		Total	
Club	Season	Division	Apps	Goals	Apps	Goals	Apps	Goals	Apps	Goals	Apps	Goals
Rochdale	2019–20	League One	0	0	0	0	0	0	1 (Note: Appearance(s) in EFL Trophy)	0	1	0
Career total			0	0	0	0	0	0	1	0	1	0
