= TCS =

TCS may refer to:

== Organisations ==
- Taxpayers for Common Sense, a US nonpartisan federal budget watchdog organization
- TCS (logistics company), a Pakistani logistics company
- The Chennai Silks, Indian retail textile chain
- The Container Store, an American retail chain company which trades on the NYSE as TCS
- Touring Club Suisse, a Swiss automobilists' organization
- Trade Commissioner Service, part of the Canadian Department of Foreign Affairs and International Trade
- Trilateral Cooperation Secretariat, between China, Japan, and South Korea
- Train Charter Services, a Dutch railway undertaking specialised in international charter and open-access services.

=== Schools ===
- Tallassee City School District (Tallassee City Schools), Alabama, US
- Tallavana Christian School, Florida, US
- The Covenant School (disambiguation)
- Tokyo Chinese School, Japan
- Townsville Cathedral School, Australia
- Trinity Christian School (disambiguation)
- Trinity College School, Canada
- Teignmouth Community School, Uk

== Media ==
- Telecorporación Salvadoreña, a television network in El Salvador
- Television Corporation of Singapore, now part of MediaCorp TV
  - TCS International, a defunct television channel
- Terrestrial Trunked Radio (Tetra Connectivity Server) from Cassidian
- The Cambridge Student, a Cambridge University student newspaper
- TCS Daily, a former online magazine
- Twentieth Century Studios, an American film studio

== Science and technology ==
- Tata Consultancy Services, a multinational IT company headquartered in India
- Tethered spinal cord syndrome, a group of neurological disorders
- Treacher Collins syndrome, a genetic disorder
- Theoretical computer science, a subset of general computer science and mathematics
- Theoretical Computer Science, a scientific journal about the above topic
- Tactical Control System, protocols for unmanned aerial vehicles
- DEC Technical Character Set, a character set supported by various DEC terminals
- Test Case Specification, as defined in IEEE 829
- Thermal control subsystem
- Track control system
- Traction control system
- Centralized traffic control or traffic control system, in North American railroading
- TV Camera Set, Northrop Corporation AAX-1 optical system,
- Trichlorosilane, an inorganic chemical compound
- Time/Temperature Control for Safety Foods

== Other uses ==
- Taking Children Seriously, a parenting movement and educational philosophy
- Teaching Company Scheme or Knowledge Transfer Partnerships, a part UK government-funded programme
- Torres Strait Creole has the ISO 639 code tcs
- Turkish Cypriots (TCs)
