= Trinity Grammar School =

Trinity Grammar School may refer to:

In Australia:

- Trinity Grammar School (Victoria) located in the Melbourne suburb of Kew, Victoria
- Trinity Grammar School (New South Wales) located in the Sydney suburb of Summer Hill, New South Wales
- Trinity Grammar School Preparatory School located in the Sydney suburb of Strathfield, New South Wales

In the United Kingdom:

- Woodside High School, Wood Green, formerly known as Trinity Grammar School

== See also ==
- Trinity School (disambiguation)
