= Trinity Theological Seminary =

Trinity Theological Seminary may refer to:

- Trinity College of the Bible and Theological Seminary
- Trinity Theological Seminary, Legon

== See also ==
- Trinity Seminary (disambiguation)
- Trinity Theological College (disambiguation)
