= 2019–20 Rochdale A.F.C. season =

English football club season

Rochdale
2019–20 season
- Chairman: Andrew Kilpatrick
- Manager: Brian Barry-Murphy
- Stadium: Spotland Stadium
- League One: 18th
- FA Cup: Third round
- EFL Cup: Third round
- EFL Trophy: Group stage
- Top goalscorer: League: Ian Henderson (15); All: Ian Henderson (16)
Home colours	Away colours	Third colours

The 2019–20 season was Rochdale A.F.C.'s 113th in existence and their sixth consecutive season in League One. Along with competing in League One, the club participate in the FA Cup, EFL Cup and EFL Trophy. The season covered the period from 1 July 2019 to 30 June 2020.

== First-team squad ==
No.	Name	Pos.	Nat.	Place of birth	Age	Apps	Goals	Signed from	Date signed	Fee	Ends
Goalkeepers
12	Jay Lynch	GK	(England)	Salford	27	12	0	AFC Fylde	19 August 2019	Free	2021
25	Robert Sánchez	GK	(Spain)	Cartagena	22	35	0	Brighton & Hove Albion	24 July 2019	Loan	2020
31	Bradley Wade	GK	(England)		18	0	0	Academy	1 July 2018	Trainee	2020
Defenders
2	Ryan McLaughlin	RB	(Northern Ireland)	Belfast	25	19	0	Blackpool	23 January 2019	Undisclosed	2020
3	Rhys Norrington-Davies	LB	(Wales)	Riyadh	21	34	1	Sheffield United	2 July 2019	Loan	2020
4	Jimmy McNulty	CB	(England)	Runcorn	35	191	4	Bury	1 July 2015	Free	2021
6	Eoghan O'Connell	CB	(Republic of Ireland)	Cork	24	38	0	Bury	4 July 2019	Free	2021
15	Paul McShane	CB	(Republic of Ireland)	Wicklow	34	17	1	Free agent	10 October 2019	Free	2021
41	Luke Matheson	RB	(England)	Rochdale	17	36	2	Wolverhampton Wanderers	1 February 2020	Loan	2020
Midfielders
7	Stephen Dooley	RM	(Northern Ireland)	Ballymoney	28	56	4	Coleraine	1 July 2018	Free	2021
8	Michael J. Williams	DM	(Wales)	Bangor	24	82	1	Liverpool	1 July 2018	Free	2020
10	Callum Camps	CM	(Northern Ireland) (England)	Tameside	24	240	30	Academy	1 July 2013	Trainee	2020
13	Jimmy Keohane	AM	(Republic of Ireland) (England)	Aylesbury	29	46	0	Cork City	1 February 2019	Undisclosed	2021
14	Oliver Rathbone	CM	(England)	Blackburn	23	137	12	Manchester United	1 July 2015	Free	2022
16	Matt Done	LM	(England)	Oswestry	31	238	31	Sheffield United	3 August 2017	Free	2021
20	Jimmy Ryan	CM	(Republic of Ireland) (England)	Liverpool	31	34	1	Blackpool	29 July 2019	Free	2021
21	Matty Lund	CM	(Northern Ireland) (England)	Manchester	29	135	23	Scunthorpe United	31 January 2020	Undisclosed	2021
28	Aaron Morley	CM	(England)	Bury	20	45	5	Academy	1 March 2017	Trainee	2022
35	Lewis Bradley	AM	(England)		18	7	0	Academy	28 June 2019	Trainee	2020
38	Harrison Hopper	CM	(England)		18	5	0	Academy	28 June 2019	Trainee	2020
Forwards
9	Calvin Andrew	CF	(England)	Luton	33	231	28	York City	25 July 2014	Free	2020
11	Tyler Smith	CF	(England)	Sheffield	21	4	1	Sheffield United	15 January 2020	Loan	2020
18	Aaron Wilbraham	CF	(England)	Knutsford	40	52	9	Bolton Wanderers	1 July 2018	Free	2020
22	Kwadwo Baah	CF	(England)		19	10	0	Academy	20 June 2019	Trainee	2021
36	Matty Gillam	CF	(England)	Bexley	21	32	5	Academy	1 July 2016	Trainee	2020
40	Ian Henderson	CF	(England)	Bury St Edmunds	35	343	126	Colchester United	1 July 2013	Free	2020
Out on Loan
1	Josh Lillis	GK	(England)	Derby	33	292	0	Scunthorpe United	1 July 2012	Free	2020
37	Fábio Tavares	CF	(England)	Rochdale	19	21	2	Academy	28 June 2019	Trainee	2020

=== Statistics ===
As of 13 June 2020

No.	Pos	Nat	Player	Total		League One		FA Cup		League Cup		League Trophy	
No.	Pos	Nat	Player	Apps	Goals	Apps	Goals	Apps	Goals	Apps	Goals	Apps	Goals
2	DF	(Northern Ireland) NIR	Ryan McLaughlin	6	0	0+3	0	0+2	0	0+1	0	0+0	0
3	DF	(Wales) WAL	Rhys Norrington-Davies	34	1	27+0	1	4+0	0	2+0	0	1+0	0
4	DF	(England) ENG	James McNulty	17	0	13+1	0	0+0	0	2+0	0	1+0	0
6	DF	(Republic of Ireland) IRL	Eoghan O'Connell	38	0	31+0	0	6+0	0	1+0	0	0+0	0
7	MF	(Northern Ireland) NIR	Stephen Dooley	29	3	19+3	3	2+1	0	3+0	0	1+0	0
8	MF	(Wales) WAL	Jordan Williams	35	1	28+0	0	5+0	1	2+0	0	0+0	0
9	FW	(England) ENG	Calvin Andrew	29	0	3+17	0	0+4	0	1+2	0	1+1	0
10	MF	(Northern Ireland) NIR	Callum Camps	38	8	28+0	6	6+0	0	3+0	2	0+1	0
11	FW	(England) ENG	Tyler Smith	4	1	2+2	1	0+0	0	0+0	0	0+0	0
12	GK	(England) ENG	Jay Lynch	12	0	8+0	0	0+1	0	0+0	0	3+0	0
13	MF	(Republic of Ireland) IRL	Jimmy Keohane	37	0	26+2	0	5+0	0	2+0	0	2+0	0
14	MF	(England) ENG	Oliver Rathbone	31	3	19+5	2	1+1	0	1+2	1	2+0	0
15	DF	(Republic of Ireland) IRL	Paul McShane	17	1	15+1	0	1+0	1	0+0	0	0+0	0
16	MF	(England) ENG	Matt Done	31	1	14+10	0	4+0	0	2+0	1	1+0	0
18	FW	(England) ENG	Aaron Wilbraham	27	5	11+8	3	2+3	1	0+1	0	2+0	1
20	MF	(Republic of Ireland) IRL	Jimmy Ryan	34	1	16+8	1	4+1	0	1+1	0	3+0	0
21	MF	(Northern Ireland) NIR	Matty Lund	5	1	5+0	1	0+0	0	0+0	0	0+0	0
22	FW	(England) ENG	Kwadwo Baah	10	0	4+3	0	1+0	0	0+0	0	0+2	0
25	GK	(Spain) ESP	Robert Sánchez	35	0	26+0	0	6+0	0	3+0	0	0+0	0
28	MF	(England) ENG	Aaron Morley	32	5	18+5	3	4+0	1	3+0	1	2+0	0
35	MF	(England) ENG	Lewis Bradley	6	0	0+2	0	1+0	0	0+0	0	3+0	0
36	FW	(England) ENG	Matty Gillam	5	0	0+2	0	0+0	0	0+0	0	2+1	0
38	MF	(England) ENG	Harrison Hopper	4	0	0+1	0	0+0	0	0+0	0	1+2	0
40	FW	(England) ENG	Ian Henderson	39	16	29+2	15	6+0	0	2+0	1	0+0	0
41	DF	(England) ENG	Luke Matheson	28	2	18+2	1	3+1	0	3+0	1	1+0	0
42	MF	(England) ENG	Louie Clarkson	1	0	0+0	0	0+0	0	0+0	0	0+1	0
43	FW	(England) ENG	Peter Thomas	1	0	0+0	0	0+0	0	0+0	0	0+1	0
44	MF	(England) ENG	Toby Phillips	2	0	0+0	0	0+0	0	0+0	0	2+0	0
45	DF	(England) ENG	Joe Dunne	1	0	0+0	0	0+0	0	0+0	0	1+0	0
Players out on loan:
37	FW	(England) ENG	Fábio Tavares	21	2	1+13	1	1+3	0	0+0	0	3+0	1
Players who left the club:
11	FW	(England) ENG	Rekeil Pyke	20	3	11+2	1	3+1	0	0+2	1	1+0	1
21	DF	(England) ENG	Tyler Magloire	5	0	2+0	0	1+0	0	2+0	0	0+0	0

=== Goals record ===
As of 13 June 2020

Rank	No.	Nat.	Po.	Name	League One	FA Cup	League Cup	League Trophy	Total
1	40	(England)	CF	Ian Henderson	15	0	1	0	16
2	10	(Northern Ireland)	AM	Callum Camps	6	0	2	0	8
3	18	(England)	CF	Aaron Wilbraham	3	0	1	1	5
3	28	(England)	CM	Aaron Morley	3	1	1	0	5
5	7	(Northern Ireland)	RM	Stephen Dooley	3	0	0	0	3
5	~~11~~	(England)	LW	Rekeil Pyke	1	0	1	1	3
5	14	(England)	CM	Oliver Rathbone	2	0	1	0	3
8	37	(England)	CF	Fábio Tavares	1	0	0	1	2
8	41	(England)	RB	Luke Matheson	1	0	1	0	2
10	3	(Wales)	LB	Rhys Norrington-Davies	1	0	0	0	1
10	8	(Wales)	DM	Jordan Williams	0	1	0	0	1
10	11	(England)	CF	Tyler Smith	1	0	0	0	1
10	15	(Republic of Ireland)	CB	Paul McShane	0	1	0	0	1
10	16	(England)	LM	Matt Done	0	0	1	0	1
10	20	(Republic of Ireland)	CM	Jimmy Ryan	1	0	0	0	1
10	21	(Northern Ireland)	CM	Matty Lund	1	0	0	0	1
Total					39	3	9	3	51

=== Disciplinary record ===
As of 13 June 2020

Rank	No.	Nat.	Po.	Name	League One			FA Cup			League Cup			League Trophy			Total		
Rank	No.	Nat.	Po.	Name	Yellow card	(yellow card) (yellow-red card)	Red card	Yellow card	(yellow card) (yellow-red card)	Red card	Yellow card	(yellow card) (yellow-red card)	Red card	Yellow card	(yellow card) (yellow-red card)	Red card	Yellow card	(yellow card) (yellow-red card)	Red card
1	10	(Northern Ireland)	AM	Callum Camps	6	0	0	0	0	0	1	0	0	0	0	0	7	0	0
2	8	(Wales)	DM	Jordan Williams	4	1	0	0	0	0	0	0	0	0	0	0	4	1	0
3	6	(Republic of Ireland)	CB	Eoghan O'Connell	4	0	0	0	0	0	1	0	0	0	0	0	5	0	0
3	7	(Northern Ireland)	RM	Stephen Dooley	3	0	0	1	0	0	0	0	0	1	0	0	5	0	0
5	14	(England)	CM	Oliver Rathbone	2	0	0	1	0	0	0	0	0	1	0	0	4	0	0
5	18	(England)	CF	Aaron Wilbraham	2	0	1	0	0	0	0	0	0	1	0	0	3	0	1
5	28	(England)	CM	Aaron Morley	4	0	0	0	0	0	0	0	0	0	0	0	4	0	0
8	3	(Wales)	LB	Rhys Norrington-Davies	3	0	0	0	0	0	0	0	0	0	0	0	3	0	0
8	9	(England)	CF	Calvin Andrew	2	0	0	1	0	0	0	0	0	0	0	0	3	0	0
8	13	(Republic of Ireland)	AM	Jimmy Keohane	2	0	0	0	0	0	1	0	0	0	0	0	3	0	0
8	20	(Republic of Ireland)	CM	Jimmy Ryan	2	0	0	1	0	0	0	0	0	0	0	0	3	0	0
8	22	(England)	LW	Kwadwo Baah	3	0	0	0	0	0	0	0	0	0	0	0	3	0	0
8	25	(Spain)	GK	Robert Sánchez	3	0	0	0	0	0	0	0	0	0	0	0	3	0	0
14	4	(England)	CB	Jimmy McNulty	2	0	0	0	0	0	0	0	0	0	0	0	2	0	0
14	40	(England)	CF	Ian Henderson	2	0	0	0	0	0	0	0	0	0	0	0	2	0	0
17	~~11~~	(England)	LW	Rekeil Pyke	0	0	0	1	0	0	0	0	0	0	0	0	1	0	0
17	12	(England)	GK	Jay Lynch	1	0	0	0	0	0	0	0	0	0	0	0	1	0	0
17	15	(Republic of Ireland)	CB	Paul McShane	1	0	0	0	0	0	0	0	0	0	0	0	1	0	0
17	36	(England)	CF	Matty Gillam	0	0	0	0	0	0	0	0	0	1	0	0	1	0	0
17	41	(England)	RB	Luke Matheson	1	0	0	0	0	0	0	0	0	0	0	0	1	0	0
Total					47	1	1	5	0	0	3	0	0	4	0	0	59	1	1

== Transfers ==
=== Transfers in ===
Date	Position	Nationality	Name	From	Fee	Ref.
4 July 2019	CB	(Republic of Ireland)	Eoghan O'Connell	(England) Bury	Free transfer	
29 July 2019	CM	(Republic of Ireland)	Jimmy Ryan	(England) Blackpool	Free transfer	
19 August 2019	GK	(England)	Jay Lynch	(England) AFC Fylde	Free transfer	
10 October 2019	CB	(Republic of Ireland)	Paul McShane	(England) Reading	Free transfer	
7 January 2020	FW	(England)	Keaton Mulvey	Free agent	Free transfer	
31 January 2020	CM	(Northern Ireland)	Matty Lund	(England) Scunthorpe United	Undisclosed	

=== Loans in ===
Date from	Position	Nationality	Name	From	Date until	Ref.
2 July 2019	LB	(Wales)	Rhys Norrington-Davies	(England) Sheffield United	30 June 2020	
3 July 2019	CF	(England)	Rekeil Pyke	(England) Huddersfield Town	30 June 2020	
24 July 2019	GK	(Spain)	Robert Sánchez	(England) Brighton & Hove Albion	30 June 2020	
8 August 2019	CB	(England)	Tyler Magloire	(England) Blackburn Rovers	30 June 2020	
15 January 2020	CF	(England)	Tyler Smith	(England) Rochdale	30 June 2020	

=== Loans out ===
Date from	Position	Nationality	Name	To	Date until	Ref.
28 August 2019	GK	(England)	Bradley Wade	(England) Barrow	October 2019	
2 September 2019	CB	(Republic of Ireland)	Ryan Delaney	(England) AFC Wimbledon	6 January 2020	
6 January 2020	GK	(England)	Bradley Wade	(England) Ramsbottom United	February 2020	
31 January 2020	GK	(England)	Bradley Wade	(England) Guiseley	30 June 2020	
4 February 2020	MF	(England)	Lewis Bradley	(England) Colne	March 2020	
21 February 2020	FW	(England)	Fábio Tavares	(England) Curzon Ashton	30 June 2020	
5 March 2020	FW	(England)	Keaton Mulvey	(England) Runcorn Linnets	April 2020	
6 March 2020	GK	(England)	Josh Lillis	(England) AFC Fylde	30 June 2020	

=== Transfers out ===
Date	Position	Nationality	Name	To	Fee	Ref.
1 July 2019	AM	(England)	Daniel Adshead	(England) Norwich City	Undisclosed	
1 July 2019	CM	(Australia)	Brad Inman	(Australia) Brisbane Roar	Released	
1 July 2019	LW	(England)	Jordan Williams	(England) AFC Fylde	Released	
2 July 2019	LB	(South Africa)	Kgosi Ntlhe	(England) Scunthorpe United	Mutual consent	
5 July 2019	CF	(Republic of Ireland)	Florian Yonsian	(England) Salford City	Undisclosed	
31 January 2020	CB	(Republic of Ireland)	Ryan Delaney	(England) Bolton Wanderers	Undisclosed	
31 January 2020	RB	(England)	Luke Matheson	(England) Wolverhampton Wanderers	£1m	

== Pre-season ==
The Dale announced pre-season friendlies against Farense, Huddersfield Town, Oldham Athletic, Ramsbottom United, Bradford City and Hyde United.

6 July 2019 Friendly	Farense	1–0	Rochdale	Albufeira, Portugal
11:00 WEST	Simões 21'	Report		Stadium: Estadio de Municipal da Albufeira

17 July 2019 Friendly	Rochdale	1–3	Huddersfield Town	Rochdale
19:45 BST	Henderson 9'	Report	Kachunga 44'; Hogg 60'; Koroma 63'	Stadium: Spotland Stadium

20 July 2019 Friendly	Oldham Athletic	2–3	Rochdale	Oldham
15:00 BST	Maouche 27'; Hamer 32'	Report	Done 7'; Keohane 12'; Henderson 83'	Stadium: Boundary Park

24 July 2019 Friendly	Ramsbottom United	2–3	Rochdale	Ramsbottom
19:45 BST	Trialist 18'; Trialist 40'	Report	Dooley 1'; Delaney 25'; Rathbone 38'	Stadium: Harry Williams Riverside Stadium

27 July 2019 Friendly	Rochdale	0–1	Bradford City	Rochdale
15:00 BST			Doyle 38' (pen.)	Stadium: Spotland Stadium

30 July 2019 Friendly	Hyde United	3–0	Rochdale	Hyde
19:45 BST	Tongue 33', 34'; Dyche 62'	Report		Stadium: Ewen Fields

== Competitions ==
=== League One ===
==== League table ====
Pos	Team	Pld	W	D	L	GF	GA	GD	Pts	PPG	Promotion, qualification or relegation
14	Bristol Rovers	35	12	9	14	38	49	−11	45	1.29	
15	Shrewsbury Town	34	10	11	13	31	42	−11	41	1.21	
16	Lincoln City	35	12	6	17	44	46	−2	42	1.20	
17	Accrington Stanley	35	10	10	15	47	53	−6	40	1.14	
18	Rochdale	34	10	6	18	39	57	−18	36	1.06	
19	Milton Keynes Dons	35	10	7	18	36	47	−11	37	1.06	
20	AFC Wimbledon	35	8	11	16	39	52	−13	35	1.00	
21	Tranmere Rovers (R)	34	8	8	18	36	60	−24	32	0.94	Relegation to EFL League Two
22	Southend United (R)	35	4	7	24	39	85	−46	19	0.54	Relegation to EFL League Two

Source: EFL Official Website
Rules for classification: 1) Points per game; 2) Goal difference; 3) Number of goals scored; 4) Head-to-head results; 5) Wins; 6) Away goals; 7) Penalty points (sec 9.5); 8) 12-point sending-off offences
(R) Relegated

==== Results summary ====
Overall								Home						Away					
Pld	W	D	L	GF	GA	GD	Pts	W	D	L	GF	GA	GD	W	D	L	GF	GA	GD
34	10	6	18	39	57	−18	36	5	4	7	19	22	−3	5	2	11	20	35	−15

Last updated: 7 March 2020.

==== Results by matchday ====
Matchday	1	2	3	4	5	6	7	8	9	10	11	12	13	14	15	16	17	18	19	20	21	22	23	24	25	26	27	28	29	30	31	32	33	34
Ground	A	H	A	H	H	A	A	H	A	H	A	H	A	H	A	H	H	A	H	A	A	H	A	A	H	A	H	A	H	A	A	H	A	H
Result	W	D	D	L	D	W	L	D	L	L	L	W	W	W	L	L	L	L	L	W	L	L	L	W	W	L	D	L	W	D	L	L	L	W
Position	5	5	10	13	13	10	16	16	17	18	19	17	14	12	14	14	15	16	16	16	18	19	19	18	18	18	18	18	18	18	19	19	20	19

Updated to match(es) played on 28 February 2020. Source: Statto.com
A = Away; H = Home; W = Win; D = Draw; L = Loss

==== Matches ====
On Thursday, 20 June 2019, the EFL League One fixtures were revealed.

3 August 2019 1	Tranmere Rovers	2–3	Rochdale	Birkenhead
15:00 BST	Jennings (yellow card) 45+2' (goal) 90+3'; Banks (yellow card) 53'; Dooley 89' (o.g.); Hepburn-Murphy (red card) 90+4'	Report	Henderson 12', 48'; Rathbone (yellow card) 41'; Sánchez (yellow card) 58'; Norrington-Davies 69'; Williams (yellow card) 90+4'	Stadium: Prenton Park; Attendance: 8,032; Referee: Anthony Backhouse

10 August 2019 2	Rochdale	1–1	Doncaster Rovers	Rochdale
15:00 BST	Morley 66' (yellow card) 72'; Keohane (yellow card) 89'	Report	Anderson (yellow card) 41'; Sadlier 90+3'	Stadium: Spotland; Attendance: 3,587; Referee: Trevor Kettle

17 August 2019 3	Shrewsbury Town	0–0	Rochdale	Shrewsbury
15:00 BST	Ebanks-Landell (yellow card) 39'; Whalley (yellow card) 61'	Report	Norrington-Davies (yellow card) 78'	Stadium: New Meadow; Attendance: 5,641; Referee: Ben Toner

20 August 2019 4	Rochdale	1–2	Sunderland	Rochdale
19:45 BST	Camps 33'	Report	O'Nien (yellow card) 13'; McGeady 28'; Wyke 56' (yellow card) 67'; McLaughlin (yellow card) 66'; Leadbitter (yellow card) 77'	Stadium: Spotland; Attendance: 5,258; Referee: John Busby

24 August 2019 5	Rochdale	0–0	Blackpool	Rochdale
15:00 BST	O'Connell (yellow card) 86'	Report	Nuttall (yellow card) 83'	Stadium: Spotland; Attendance: 4,664; Referee: Carl Boyeson

31 August 2019 6	Southend United	0–3	Rochdale	Southend-on-Sea
15:00 BST	Hyam (yellow card) 16'; Hamilton (yellow card) 29'	Report	Henderson 35'; Morley 37'; Williams (yellow card) 43'; Camps 77'	Stadium: Roots Hall; Attendance: 5,614; Referee: Lee Swabey

14 September 2019 7	Peterborough United	6–0	Rochdale	Peterborough
15:00 BST	Toney 18', 45', 58'; Eisa 34'; Maddison 51', 62' (pen.)	Report	McNulty (yellow card) 22'; Dooley (yellow card) 40'; Norrington-Davies (yellow card) 57'; Williams (yellow card) 60'	Stadium: London Road; Attendance: 5,733; Referee: Darren Drysdale

17 September 2019 8	Rochdale	1–1	Lincoln City	Rochdale
19:45 BST	Dooley 13'; Camps (yellow card) 50'	Report	Shackell (yellow card) 49'; Connolly (yellow card) 55'; Walker 86'	Stadium: Spotland; Attendance: 2,659; Referee: Ross Joyce

21 September 2019 9	Fleetwood Town	2–1	Rochdale	Fleetwood
15:00 BST	Andrew 22'; Evans 87'		Pyke 8'; Camps (yellow card) 63'; McNulty (yellow card) 71'; Morley (yellow card) 79'; Dooley (yellow card) 90+3'	Stadium: Highbury Stadium; Attendance: 3,229; Referee: Graham Salisbury

28 September 2019 10	Rochdale	0–3	Wycombe Wanderers	Rochdale
15:00 BST	Andrew (yellow card) 50'	Report	Onyedinma 16', 77'; Akinfenwa 26'; Mascoll (yellow card) 90'	Stadium: Spotland; Attendance: 3,039; Referee: Darren Handley

5 October 2019 11	AFC Wimbledon	3–2	Rochdale	London
15:00 BST	Forss 2'; Osew 16'; Pinnock 28'; Wordsworth (yellow card) 45+1'	Report	Henderson 66', 90+5'; Wilbraham (yellow card) 70'	Stadium: Kingsmeadow; Attendance: 4,068; Referee: James Oldham

12 October 2019 12	Rochdale	2–1	Accrington Stanley	Rochdale
15:00 BST	Henderson 40', 49'	Report	Pritchard 53'; Sykes (yellow card) 64'; Opoku (yellow card) 84'	Stadium: Spotland; Attendance: 3,508; Referee: Tom Nield

19 October 2019 13	Bolton Wanderers	1–3	Rochdale	Bolton
15:00 BST	Lowe (yellow card) 14'; Verlinden 56'; Zouma (yellow card) 89'	Report	Camps 65' (yellow card) 81'; Rathbone 70' (yellow card) 74'; Morley (yellow card) 80'; Tavares 84'	Stadium: University of Bolton Stadium; Attendance: 13,828; Referee: Antony Coggins

22 October 2019 14	Rochdale	2–0	Milton Keynes Dons	Rochdale
19:45 BST	Camps 3'; Henderson 60'; Lynch (yellow card) 81'	Report	Gilbey (yellow card) 31'; Boateng (yellow card) 64'	Stadium: Spotland Stadium; Attendance: 2,286; Referee: Robert Lewis

26 October 2019 15	Oxford United	3–0	Rochdale	Oxford
15:00 BST	Ruffels 20'; Fosu 27'; Sykes (yellow card) 45'; Long 86'	Report	Wilbraham (red card) 40'	Stadium: Kassam Stadium; Attendance: 6,666; Referee: Nick Kinseley

2 November 2019 16	Rochdale	1–2	Bristol Rovers	Rochdale
15:00 BST	Camps 44'	Report	Adeboyejo 8'; O'Connell 11' (o.g.); Kilgour (yellow card) 37'; Ogogo (yellow card) 87'	Stadium: Spotland Stadium; Referee: Martin Coy

5 November 2019 17	Rochdale	0–1	Ipswich Town	Rochdale
19:45 GMT		Report	Norwood (yellow card) 43'; Rowe 53'	Stadium: Spotland Stadium; Attendance: 3,150; Referee: Scott Oldham

16 November 2019 18	Coventry City	2–1	Rochdale	Birmingham
15:00 GMT	Shipley 42'; Drysdale (yellow card) 61'; Walsh 72'	Report	Henderson 28'; Ryan (yellow card) 39'	Stadium: St Andrew's; Attendance: 5,433; Referee: Marc Edwards

23 November 2019 19	Rochdale	0–3	Portsmouth	Rochdale
15:00 GMT		Report	Curtis 15', 47'; Williams 88'	Stadium: Spotland Stadium; Attendance: 3,789; Referee: James Adcock

7 December 2019 20	Rotherham United	0–1	Rochdale	Rotherham
15:00 GMT	Crooks (yellow card) 83'; Ogbene (yellow card) 87'	Report	Camps (yellow card) 16'; Morley 42'; Baah (yellow card) 87'	Stadium: AESSEAL New York Stadium; Attendance: 8,313; Referee: Chris Sarginson

21 December 2019 21	Burton Albion	3–1	Rochdale	Burton upon Trent
15:00 GMT	Edwards 11'; Akins 18'; Boyce 82'	Report	Camps 2'	Stadium: Pirelli Stadium; Attendance: 2,298; Referee: Graham Salisbury

26 December 2019 22	Rochdale	2–3	Fleetwood Town	Rochdale
15:00 GMT	Wilbraham 41', 60' (yellow card) 41'; Baah (yellow card) 88'; O'Connell (yellow card) 90+1'	Report	Madden 53'; Wilbraham 65' (o.g.); Burns 89' (yellow card) 90+9'	Stadium: Spotland Stadium; Attendance: 3,167; Referee: Andy Haines

29 December 2019 23	Gillingham	1–0	Rochdale	Gillingham
13:00 GMT	Lee (yellow card) 81'; Ogilvie 86' (yellow card) 90+6'; O'Keefe (yellow card) 90+7'	Report	Keohane (yellow card) 28'; O'Connell (yellow card) 57'; Camps (yellow card) 67'; Baah (yellow card) 69'; Sánchez (yellow card) 79'; Williams (yellow card) 90+6' (yellow-red card) 90+6'	Stadium: Priestfield Stadium; Attendance: 4,761; Referee: David Rock

1 January 2020 24	Accrington Stanley	1–2	Rochdale	Accrington
15:00 GMT	Barclay (yellow card) 22'; Finley (yellow card) 55'; Zanzala 90+2'	Report	Henderson 45+4'; Dooley 64'	Stadium: Crown Ground; Attendance: 2,975; Referee: Tom Nield

4 January 2020	Rochdale	v	AFC Wimbledon	Rochdale
15:00 GMT		Report		Stadium: Spotland Stadium
Note: The match was postponed on 23 December, due to the clubs involvement in the FA Cup.

11 January 2020 25	Rochdale	2–0	Bolton Wanderers	Rochdale
15:00 GMT	Matheson 44'; O'Connell (yellow card) 54'; Ryan 80'	Report	Hamilton (yellow card) 85'	Stadium: Spotland Stadium; Attendance: 5,560; Referee: Leigh Doughty

18 January 2020 26	Wycombe Wanderers	2–1	Rochdale	Wycombe
15:00 GMT	McCarthy 31'; Charles (yellow card) 80'; Jacobson 90+4' (pen.)	Report	Henderson 18'; Dooley (yellow card) 75'; Andrew (yellow card) 79'	Stadium: Adams Park; Attendance: 4,498; Referee: Craig Hicks

25 January 2020 27	Rochdale	2–2	Gillingham	Rochdale
15:00 GMT	Henderson 28' (pen.); Ryan (yellow card) 45+3'; Dooley 68'	Report	Roberts 32', 59' (yellow card) 76'	Stadium: Spotland Stadium; Attendance: 3,084; Referee: Paul Marsden

28 January 2020 28	Milton Keynes Dons	2–1	Rochdale	Milton Keynes
19:45 GMT	Kasumu (yellow card) 33'; Morris 49'; Thompson (yellow card) 50'; Brittain (yellow card) 51'; Gilbey (yellow card) 82'; Healey 90+3' (pen.)	Report	Henderson 16'; Norrington-Davies (yellow card) 66'	Stadium: Stadium MK; Attendance: 6,393; Referee: Charles Breakspear

1 February 2020 29	Rochdale	1–0	Shrewsbury Town	Rochdale
15:00 GMT	Smith 88'	Report	Williams (yellow card) 90+3'	Stadium: Spotland Stadium; Attendance: 2,829; Referee: Carl Boyeson

8 February 2020 30	Doncaster Rovers	1–1	Rochdale	Doncaster
15:00 GMT	Taylor 1'; Wright (yellow card) 62'	Report	Rathbone 81'	Stadium: Keepmoat Stadium; Attendance: 7,638; Referee: Neil Hair

11 February 2020 31	Sunderland	3–0	Rochdale	Sunderland
19:45 GMT	Gooch 11', 32'; O'Connell 15' (o.g.)	Report	Henderson (yellow card) 24'	Stadium: Stadium of Light; Attendance: 27,401; Referee: Graham Salisbury

15 February 2020	Rochdale	v	Tranmere Rovers	Rochdale
15:00 GMT		Report		Stadium: Spotland Stadium
Note: Match was postponed due to a waterlogged pitch.

22 February 2020 32	Rochdale	1–2	Coventry City	Rochdale
15:00 GMT	Matheson (yellow card) 41'; McShane (yellow card) 50'; Wilbraham 72'; Henderson (yellow card) 78'	Report	Rose 4'; McCallum (yellow card) 21'; Godden 71'	Stadium: Spotland Stadium; Referee: Chris Sarginson

28 February 2020 33	Portsmouth	3–0	Rochdale	Portsmouth
19:45 GMT	Williams 45'; Burgess (yellow card) 54' (goal) 84'; Seddon 78'	Report	Norrington-Davies (yellow card) 44'; Morley (yellow card) 51'; Camps (yellow card) 59'	Stadium: Fratton Park; Attendance: 17,600; Referee: Nick Kinseley

7 March 2020 34	Rochdale	3–1	Rotherham United	Rochdale
15:00 GMT	Henderson 28', 70'; Williams (yellow card) 74'; Lund 75'; Sánchez (yellow card) 79'	Report	Lindsay 90+2'	Stadium: Spotland Stadium; Attendance: 4,142; Referee: Ross Joyce

17 March 2020	Rochdale	v	Tranmere Rovers	Spotland
19:45 GMT				Stadium: Spotland Stadium
Note: Season was suspended until 3 April 2020, due to the COVID-19 pandemic.

21 March 2020	Rochdale	v	Burton Albion	Spotland
15:00 GMT				Stadium: Crown Oil Arena
Note: Season was suspended until 3 April 2020, due to the COVID-19 pandemic.

24 March 2020	Rochdale	v	AFC Wimbledon	Spotland
19:45 GMT				Stadium: Crown Oil Arena
Note: Season was suspended until 3 April 2020, due to the COVID-19 pandemic.

28 March 2020	Bristol Rovers	v	Rochdale	Horfield
15:00 GMT				Stadium: Memorial Stadium
Note: Season was suspended until 3 April 2020, due to the COVID-19 pandemic.

4 April 2020	Rochdale	v	Oxford United	Spotland
15:00 GMT				Stadium: Crown Oil Arena
Note: On 3 April, the English Football League decided to postpone all football until safe to do so due to the COVID-19 pandemic.

10 April 2020	Blackpool	v	Rochdale	Blackpool
15:00 BST				Stadium: Bloomfield Road
Note: On 3 April, the English Football League decided to postpone all football until safe to do so due to the COVID-19 pandemic.

13 April 2020	Rochdale	v	Southend United	Spotland
13:00 BST				Stadium: Crown Oil Arena
Note: On 3 April, the English Football League decided to postpone all football until safe to do so due to the COVID-19 pandemic.

18 April 2020	Ipswich Town	v	Rochdale	Ipswich
15:00 BST				Stadium: Portman Road
Note: On 3 April, the English Football League decided to postpone all football until safe to do so due to the COVID-19 pandemic.

25 April 2020	Rochdale	v	Peterborough United	Spotland
15:00 BST				Stadium: Crown Oil Arena
Note: On 3 April, the English Football League decided to postpone all football until safe to do so due to the COVID-19 pandemic.

3 May 2020	Lincoln City	v	Rochdale	Lincoln
15:00 BST				Stadium: Sincil Bank
Note: On 3 April, the English Football League decided to postpone all football until safe to do so due to the COVID-19 pandemic.

=== FA Cup ===
The first round draw was made on 21 October 2019. The second round draw was made live on 11 November from Chichester City's stadium, Oaklands Park. The third round draw was made live on BBC Two from Etihad Stadium, Micah Richards and Tony Adams conducted the draw.

10 November 2019 First round	Wrexham	0–0	Rochdale	Wrexham
12:45 GMT	Jennings (yellow card) 87'	Report		Stadium: Racecourse Ground; Attendance: 3,274; Referee: Trevor Kettle

19 November 2019 First round replay	Rochdale	1–0	Wrexham	Rochdale
19:45 GMT	McShane 8'; Andrew (yellow card) 90'	Report	Rutherford (yellow card) 45+1'; Jennings (yellow card) 90+3'	Stadium: Spotland Stadium; Attendance: 1,628; Referee: Seb Stockbridge

1 December 2019 Second round	Rochdale	0–0	Boston United	Rochdale
14:00 GMT		Report	Abbott (yellow card) 77'; Duhaney (yellow card) 81'	Stadium: Spotland Stadium; Attendance: 2,583; Referee: Dean Whitestone

16 December 2019 Second round replay	Boston United	1–2	Rochdale	Boston
19:30 GMT	Thewlis (yellow card) 45+3' (goal) 49'; Penny (yellow card) 54'; Platt (yellow card) 90+3'	Report	Crook 4' (o.g.); Pyke (yellow card) 54'; Morley 79' (pen.); Dooley (yellow card) 86'	Stadium: The Jakemans Stadium; Attendance: 4,190; Referee: Ollie Yates

4 January 2020 Third round	Rochdale	1–1	Newcastle United	Rochdale
12:31 GMT	Rathbone (yellow card) 62'; Wilbraham 79'	Report	Almirón 17'	Stadium: Spotland Stadium; Attendance: 8,593; Referee: David Coote

14 January 2020 Third round replay	Newcastle United	4–1	Rochdale	Newcastle
19:45 GMT	O'Connell 17' (o.g.); Longstaff 20'; Almirón 26'; Joelinton 82'; Allan (yellow card) 84'	Report	Ryan (yellow card) 75'; Williams 86'	Stadium: St James' Park; Attendance: 29,786; Referee: Graham Scott

=== EFL Cup ===
The first round draw was made on 20 June. The second round draw was made on 13 August 2019 following the conclusion of all but one first-round matches. The third round draw was confirmed on 28 August 2019, live on Sky Sports.

13 August 2019 First round	Rochdale	5–2	Bolton Wanderers	Rochdale
19:45 BST	Henderson 27' (pen.); Pyke 64'; Camps 66', 73'; Rathbone 86'	Report	Darcy 14'; Politic 48'	Stadium: Spotland; Attendance: 3,362; Referee: Andy Haines

27 August 2019 Second round	Rochdale	2–1	Carlisle United	Rochdale
19:45 BST	Morley 11'; Done 31'; Camps (yellow card) 67'; O'Connell (yellow card) 70'; Keohane (yellow card) 90+1'	Report	Bridge 71' (pen.)	Stadium: Spotland; Attendance: 1,974; Referee: Peter Wright

25 September 2019 Third round	Manchester United	1–1 (5–3 p)	Rochdale	Manchester
20:00 BST	Greenwood 68'; Williams (yellow card) 72'	Report	Matheson 76'	Stadium: Old Trafford; Referee: John Brooks
	Penalties
	Mata (penalty scored); Pereira (penalty scored); Fred (penalty scored); Greenwood (penalty scored); James (penalty scored)		Andrew (penalty scored); Keohane (penalty missed); Morley (penalty scored); Wilbraham (penalty scored)

=== EFL Trophy ===
On 9 July 2019, the pre-determined group stage draw was announced with Invited clubs to be drawn on 12 July 2019.

Pos	Div	Team	Pld	W	PW	PL	L	GF	GA	GD	Pts	Qualification
1	ACA	Manchester City U21	3	2	0	0	1	5	4	+1	6	Advance to Round 2
2	L1	Bolton Wanderers	3	1	0	2	0	5	3	+2	5	Advance to Round 2
3	L1	Rochdale	3	1	1	0	1	3	4	−1	5	
4	L2	Bradford City	3	0	1	0	2	3	5	−2	2	

Source: EFL.com

11 September 2019 Group stage	Rochdale	0–2	Manchester City U21	Rochdale
19:45 BST	Rathbone (yellow card) 21'	Report	Braaf 31'; Bernabé 58'; Tecagne (yellow card) 73'	Stadium: Spotland; Attendance: 1,172; Referee: Michael Salisbury

1 October 2019 Group stage	Rochdale	1–1 (5–3 p)	Bolton Wanderers	Rochdale
19:45 BST	Wilbraham (yellow card) 25' (goal) 57'	Report	Emmanuel (yellow card) 23'; Crawford 45+2'	Stadium: Spotland; Attendance: 1,412; Referee: Leigh Doughty
	Penalties
	Andrew (penalty scored); Gillam (penalty scored); Morley (penalty scored); Norrington-Davies (penalty scored); Keohane (penalty scored)		Crawford (penalty scored); Politic (penalty scored); Verlinden (penalty scored); Chicksen (penalty missed)

12 November 2019 Group stage	Bradford City	1–2	Rochdale	Bradford
19:30 BST	French 15'; Reeves (yellow card) 39'	Report	Gillam (yellow card) 18'; Pyke 29'; Tavares 35'	Stadium: Valley Parade; Attendance: 761; Referee: Darren Drysdale
