= Trinity Theological College =

Trinity Theological College may refer to:

- Trinity Theological College, Perth, an evangelical Christian college
- Trinity Theological College, Singapore, an ecumenical Christian college
- Trinity College, Bristol, an Anglican theological college
- Trinity College of Florida, an interdenominational evangelical theological college
- Trinity College, Glasgow, a Church of Scotland theological college within the University of Glasgow
- Trinity College Queensland, a theological college of the Uniting Church in Australia
- Holy Trinity College, Catholic University of Zimbabwe, a Roman Catholic theological college
- Trinity College Theological School, part of Trinity College, Melbourne, and the University of Divinity
- Theological College of the Holy Trinity, a college of the Ethiopian Orthodox Church
- Trinity Bible College and Graduate School, a Pentecostal theological college
- Trinity College of the Bible and Theological Seminary, a distance-learning evangelical theological college

== See also ==
- Trinity Seminary (disambiguation)
- Trinity Theological Seminary (disambiguation)
