= Trinity University (disambiguation) =

Trinity University is a private liberal arts university in San Antonio, Texas, United States.

Trinity University may also refer to:

- Trinity University of Asia, formerly known as Trinity College of Quezon City, Quezon City, Philippines
- Trinity International University, Deerfield, Illinois, United States
- Trinity Washington University, Washington, DC, United States
- Trinity Western University, Langley, British Columbia, Canada
- Leeds Trinity University, Leeds, England, UK

== See also ==
- Trinity College (disambiguation)
- Trinity College, Toronto, Ontario, Canada, occasionally referred to as the University of Trinity College
- Bronte International University, formerly known as Trinity College and University, Tortola, British Virgin Islands
