= Trinity Christian High School =

Trinity Christian High School may refer to:

- Trinity Christian High School (Hull, Iowa)
- Trinity Christian High School (Lubbock, Texas)
- Trinity Christian High School (Monterey)

== See also ==
- Trinity Christian School (disambiguation)
- Trinity College (disambiguation)
- Trinity High School (disambiguation)
- Trinity School (disambiguation)
