= Trinity Episcopal School =

Trinity Episcopal School may refer to:

- Trinity Episcopal School New Orleans, Louisiana
- Trinity Episcopal Day School, Mississippi
- Trinity Episcopal School of Austin, Texas
- Trinity Episcopal School (Galveston), Texas
- Trinity Episcopal School (Virginia), Virginia

== See also ==
- Trinity School (disambiguation)
