= National Association of Private Nontraditional Schools and Colleges =

The National Association of Private Nontraditional Schools and Colleges (NAPNSC) was a United States educational accreditation agency, based in Grand Junction, Colorado, that was not recognized by the U.S. Department of Education or the Council for Higher Education Accreditation. NAPNSC specialized in the accreditation of higher education institutions that exclusively offer distance education programs.

== History ==
It was established in 1974, under the name National Association for Schools and Colleges, by educators associated with Western Colorado University, an institution in Grand Junction which has subsequently closed down. According to John Bear, although the organization continued to improve its standards and process, its applications for Department of Education recognition were turned down on multiple occasions. NAPNSC continued to seek recognition. Because the organization was not a recognized U.S. accreditor, students attending institutions that are accredited solely by NAPNSC are not eligible for Title IV student assistance funding (Pell Grants, Stafford Loans, etc.).

In September 2010, John Bear reported on his website that the organization "seem[ed] to have gone away". He noted that its website had not been updated in the previous three years and its telephone number was "no longer in service".

== Accredited institutions ==
As of November 2006, three institutions were listed as being accredited by NAPNSC. They were:

- Cook's Institute of Electronics Engineering, Jackson, Mississippi, accredited since 1989
- Trinity College of the Bible and Theological Seminary, Newburgh, Indiana, accredited since 1992
- Washington Institute for Graduate Studies, Washington School of Law, South Jordan, Utah (School intentionally severed ties to NAPNSC in 2007 as part of the due diligence of new owner and President, Robert Hanson, because NAPNSC was not recognized by USDOE or CHEA. School is currently pursuing accreditation through recognized agency.)
