= Luke Matheson (footballer) =

English footballer (born 2002)

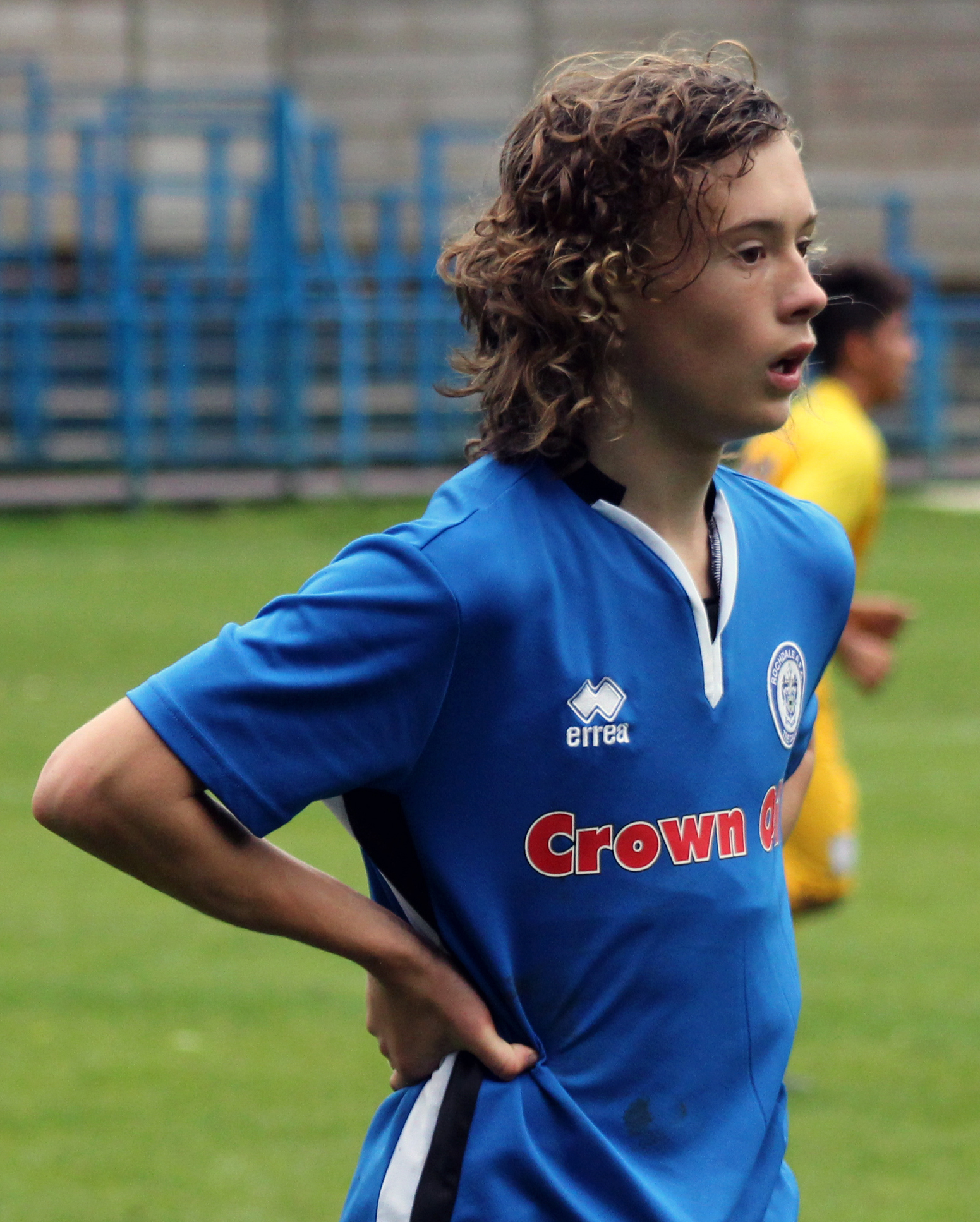
- Matheson playing for Rochdale U18s in October 2017

Personal information
- Full name: Luke Alexander Matheson
- Date of birth: 3 October 2002 (age 24)
- Place of birth: Manchester, England
- Height: 5 ft 6 in (1.68 m)
- Position: Defender

Team information
- Current team: Macclesfield

Youth career
- –2018: Rochdale

Senior career*
Years	Team	Apps	(Gls)
2018–2020	Rochdale	18	(1)
2020–2023	Wolverhampton Wanderers	0	(0)
2020	→ Rochdale (loan)	5	(0)
2021	→ Ipswich Town (loan)	2	(0)
2021	→ Hamilton Academical (loan)	9	(0)
2022	→ Scunthorpe United (loan)	13	(0)
2023–2025	Bolton Wanderers	0	(0)
2024	→ Bohemians (loan)	10	(0)
2025	→ Alfreton Town (loan)	9	(0)
2025–	Macclesfield	31	(0)

International career^{‡}
2019	England U17	1	(0)
2019–2020	England U18	5	(0)
- * Club domestic league appearances and goals as of 09:54, 16 February 2026 (UTC) ‡ National team caps and goals as of 22:16, 18 November 2019 (UTC)

Luke Alexander Matheson (born 3 October 2002) is an English professional footballer who plays as a defender for National League North club Macclesfield.

A product of the youth team at Rochdale, he made his first team debut at the age of 15 and became the club's youngest ever player. At the age of 16 he scored an equaliser against Manchester United in an EFL Cup game at Old Trafford to take the game to a penalty shootout. He earned a move to Premier League side Wolverhampton Wanderers, and was loaned to Rochdale and then Ipswich Town, Hamilton Academical and Scunthorpe United. In 2023, he left Wolves without making a senior appearance and moved to Bolton Wanderers. At Bolton, he made seven appearances, all in cup competitions, and scored once, while being loaned to Bohemians and Alfreton Town. He is a former England U17 and England U18 international with a combined total of six caps.

== Club career ==
=== Rochdale ===
Matheson was born in Fallowfield, Manchester. He attended Trinity Church of England High School in Hulme, Manchester. Progressing through Rochdale's academy, Matheson made his first-team debut on 4 September 2018, during their EFL Trophy group-stage tie against Bury at the age of 15 years and 336 days, making him the club's youngest ever debutant. As well as this, Matheson was awarded with the man-of-the-match award for his performance in the 2–1 victory.

On 19 January 2019, Matheson made his English Football League debut in a 1–1 League One draw at home to Fleetwood Town, as a half-time substitute for Matt Done.

On 25 September 2019, at the age of just 16, he scored the equaliser in a 1–1 draw against Manchester United in the EFL Cup third round at Old Trafford, which Dale eventually lost 5–3 on penalties. On 31 October, he signed a three-year professional contract with the club, having turned 17 earlier in the month.

Matheson scored his first league goal on 11 January 2020, opening a 2–0 home win over Bolton Wanderers.

=== Wolverhampton Wanderers ===
On 31 January 2020, Matheson signed for Premier League side Wolverhampton Wanderers, before re-joining Rochdale on loan for the remainder of the season. The transfer fee was £1 million. During his time at Wolves he struggled with injury, missing almost two entire season with various injuries.

In 2026, Matheson described his time at Wolves as "torrid" due to injuries and "a step backwards" due to going from senior to under-23 football.

==== Ipswich Town (loan) ====
On 1 February 2021, Matheson joined EFL League One side Ipswich Town on loan until the end of the season. He made his first appearance starting in a 2–0 win against Blackpool. He made two appearances for Ipswich before returning to Wolves at the end of his loan spell.

==== Hamilton Academical (loan) ====
On 27 August 2021, Matheson signed for Scottish club Hamilton Academical on a season-long loan. He played a total of nine Scottish Championship games and two games in the Scottish League Challenge Cup. He was recalled by Wolves to facilitate a move to Scunthorpe United.

==== Scunthorpe United (loan) ====
On 15 January 2022, Matheson signed for League Two club Scunthorpe United, for the remainder of the season. This would see him reunite with ex-Rochdale boss, Keith Hill. He made his debut on the same day, playing the full 90 minutes in a 2–0 loss against Exeter City.

Matheson was released by Wolves at the end of the 2022–23 season.

=== Bolton Wanderers ===
On 1 August 2023, Matheson completed a move to EFL League One side Bolton Wanderers on a one-year contract following a successful trial spell. He was initially assigned to the club's B team. He made his debut on 6 September in a 3–0 home win over Salford City in the EFL Trophy. Three weeks later he scored his only goal in seven games for the club (all in cups), coming on as a substitute in an 8–1 win against Manchester United under-21 in the same competition. On 19 December, he and fellow B-Team prospect Conor Carty signed new deals up to 2025 that would also promote them to the first-team squad.

Matheson joined League of Ireland Premier Division side Bohemians on 22 February 2024, on a four-month loan deal.

On 22 February 2025, Matheson joined National League North side Alfreton Town on loan for the remainder of the season.

Bolton confirmed on 7 May 2025 that Matheson would leave at the end of his contract.

=== Macclesfield ===
On 26 July 2025, Matheson joined newly promoted National League North side Macclesfield. He signed as a part-time player while coaching their under-8 team. Following defeat in the play-offs, he signed a new one-year deal at the end of the 2025–26 season.

== International career ==
In February 2019, Matheson made his international debut for the England under-17 team against France.

On 11 October 2019, Matheson made his England U18 debut during a 5–2 win away to Poland.

== Personal life ==
Matheson's parents were both teachers. Due to his serious injuries, he considered life after football, and in September 2025, he graduated with a diploma in sporting directorship through the Professional Footballers' Association business school, graduating alongside Tim Krul and Adrian Mariappa.

Matheson became friends with Ethan McLeod as both were rehabilitating at the same time at Wolverhampton Wanderers. They both signed for Macclesfield in 2025, but due to injuries only played together once, three days before McLeod's death at age 21. Matheson reflected "You don't realise how much a person almost saved you until they're not there anymore".

== Career statistics ==
As of match played 16 February 2026

Appearances and goals by club, season and competition
Club	Season	League			National cup (Note: Includes FA Cup)		League cup (Note: Includes EFL Cup)		Other		Total	
Club	Season	Division	Apps	Goals	Apps	Goals	Apps	Goals	Apps	Goals	Apps	Goals
Rochdale	2018–19	League One	3	0	0	0	0	0	4 (Note: Appearance(s) in EFL Trophy)	0	7	0
Rochdale	2019–20	League One	15	1	4	0	3	1	2	0	24	2
Rochdale	Total		18	1	4	0	3	1	6	0	31	2
Wolverhampton Wanderers	2019–20	Premier League	0	0	0	0	0	0	–		0	0
Wolverhampton Wanderers	2020–21	Premier League	0	0	0	0	0	0	–		0	0
Wolverhampton Wanderers	2021–22	Premier League	0	0	0	0	0	0	–		0	0
Wolverhampton Wanderers	2022–23	Premier League	0	0	0	0	0	0	–		0	0
Wolverhampton Wanderers	Total		0	0	0	0	0	0	–		!0	0
Wolverhampton Wanderers U21s	2021–22	—			—		—		1	0	1	0
Wolverhampton Wanderers U21s	2022–23	—			—		—		2	0	2	0
Wolverhampton Wanderers U21s	Total		—		—		—		3	0	3	0
Rochdale (loan)	2019–20	League One	5	0	0	0	0	0	0	0	5	0
Ipswich Town (loan)	2020–21	League One	2	0	0	0	0	0	0	0	2	0
Hamilton Academical (loan)	2021–22	Scottish Championship	9	0	0	0	0	0	2 (Note: Appearances in Scottish Challenge Cup)	0	11	0
Scunthorpe United (loan)	2021–22	League Two	13	0	0	0	0	0	0	0	13	0
Bolton Wanderers	2023–24	League One	0	0	1	0	0	0	4	1	5	1
Bolton Wanderers	2024–25	League One	0	0	0	0	0	0	2	0	2	0
Bolton Wanderers	Total		0	0	1	0	0	0	6	1	7	1
Bohemians (loan)	2024	LOI Premier Division	10	0	0	0	—		—		10	0
Alfreton Town (loan)	2024–25	National League North	9	0	0	0	—		—		9	0
Macclesfield	2025–26	National League North	13	0	2	0	—		—		15	0
Career total			79	1	7	0	3	1	17	1	106	3
