= Aaron Morley =

English footballer (born 2000)

- Morley in 2026

Personal information
- Full name: Aaron Paul Morley
- Date of birth: 27 February 2000 (age 26)
- Place of birth: Bury, England
- Height: 6 ft 0 in (1.83 m)
- Position: Midfielder

Team information
- Current team: Wycombe Wanderers
- Number: 5

Youth career
- Manchester City
- Bolton Wanderers
- –2016: Rochdale

Senior career*
Years	Team	Apps	(Gls)
2016–2022	Rochdale	93	(6)
2022–2026	Bolton Wanderers	138	(12)
2024–2025	→ Wycombe Wanderers (loan)	19	(2)
2026–	Wycombe Wanderers	26	(2)
- * Club domestic league appearances and goals as of 11 October 2026 (UTC)

Aaron Paul Morley (born 27 February 2000) is an English professional footballer who plays as a midfielder for EFL League One side Wycombe Wanderers.

== Career ==
=== Early career ===
Morley started his career in the academy of Manchester City and then later, the academy of Bolton Wanderers, before signing for the academy of Rochdale.

=== Rochdale ===
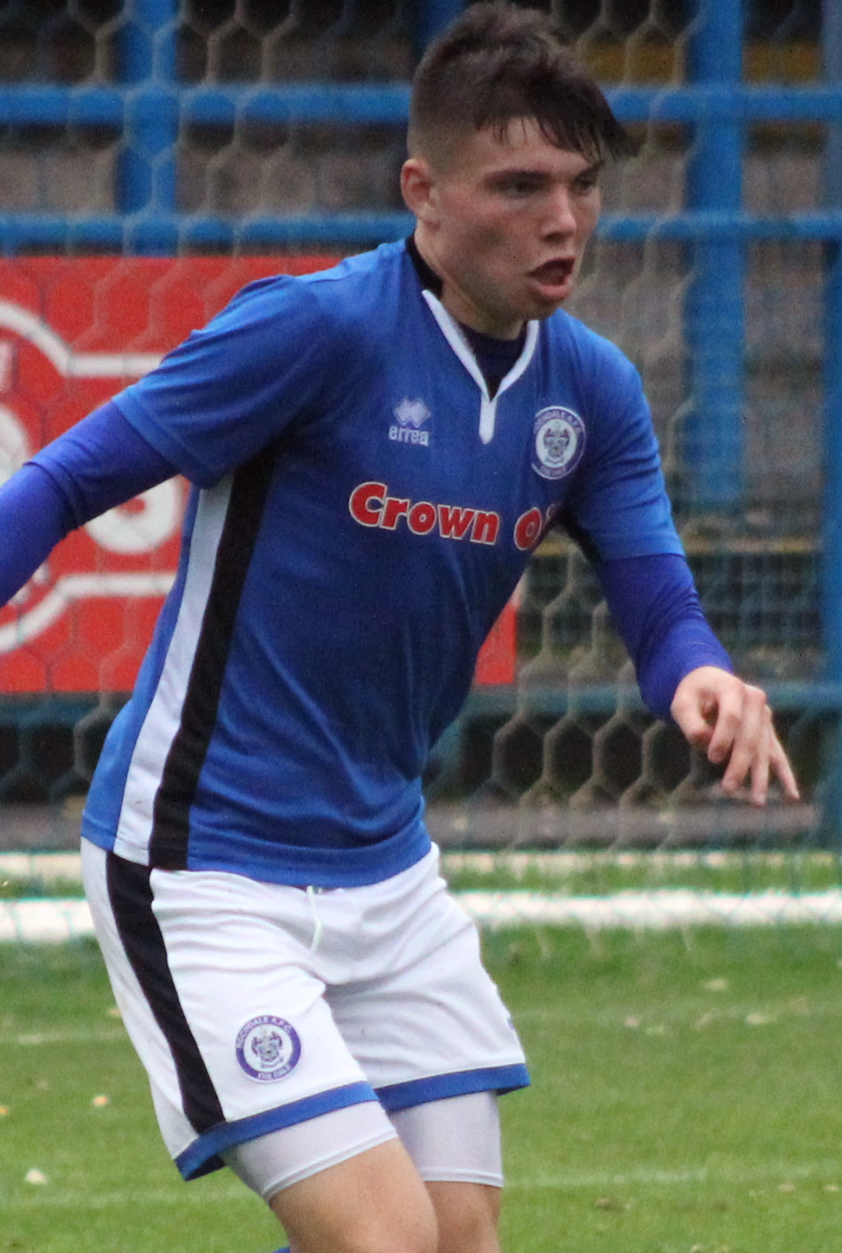
Morley playing for Rochdale U18s in 2017

After progressing through Rochdale's academy he first featured for the senior team during the 2016–17 pre-season campaign. After being named as an unused substitute regularly in League One, Morley made his competitive debut in a 2–1 EFL Trophy victory over Notts County on 4 October 2016.

He made his league debut four days later in a 3–0 win over Southend United. Morley also had a five-minute cameo in Rochdale's 2–0 FA Cup victory over Maidstone United, playing as a left-winger rather than his preferred central role.

Morley made a further three appearances for the club during the season – in two EFL Trophy matches and one league fixture.

On 1 March 2017, he signed his first professional contract with the club following his 17th birthday.

He was offered a new contract by Rochdale at the end of the 2018–19 season.

On 28 June 2019, Morley signed a new three-year contract with Rochdale.

=== Bolton Wanderers ===
On 11 January 2022, it was announced Morley had re-signed for Bolton Wanderers, having previously played in the Bolton Wanderers academy as a child, and signed a three-and-a-half-year contract with EFL League One team. He signed for an undisclosed fee which reported by The Bolton News to be around £100,000. He made his debut on 15 January in a 2–0 home win against Ipswich Town. On 2 April, he started in the 2023 EFL Trophy Final which Bolton won 4–0 against Plymouth Argyle. On 28 December 2023, he signed a new contract until 2027.

On 23 August 2024, Morley joined fellow League One side Wycombe Wanderers on a season-long loan deal. By January, Morley had helped Wycombe to the top of the table, leading Bolton to exercise a break clause and recall him from his loan on 1 January. He subsequently scored an injury time winner on his first game back away at Exeter City, three days after he had done same thing against the same opponents for Wycombe.

=== Wycombe Wanderers ===
On 29 January 2026, Morley returned to Wycombe Wanderers on a permanent deal for an undisclosed fee. The Bolton News reported they paid £750,000, which may reach £1m with performance related add-ons.

== Career statistics ==
As of match played 14 February 2026

Appearances and goals by club, season and competition
Club	Season	League			FA Cup		EFL Cup		Other		Total	
Club	Season	Division	Apps	Goals	Apps	Goals	Apps	Goals	Apps	Goals	Apps	Goals
Rochdale	2016–17	League One	2	0	1	0	0	0	3 (Note: Appearances in the EFL Trophy)	0	6	0
Rochdale	2017–18	League One	0	0	0	0	0	0	0	0	0	0
Rochdale	2018–19	League One	3	0	0	0	0	0	4	0	7	0
Rochdale	2019–20	League One	23	3	4	1	3	1	2	0	32	5
Rochdale	2020–21	League One	44	2	1	0	2	0	3	0	50	2
Rochdale	2021–22	League Two	21	1	3	1	2	0	0	0	26	2
Rochdale	Total		93	6	9	2	7	1	12	0	121	9
Bolton Wanderers	2021–22	League One	21	1	0	0	0	0	0	0	21	1
Bolton Wanderers	2022–23	League One	41	4	1	0	0	0	8 (Note: Six appearances in the EFL Trophy, two appearances in the League One play-offs)	2	50	6
Bolton Wanderers	2023–24	League One	37	3	4	0	2	0	7 (Note: Six appearances in the EFL Trophy, one appearance in the League One play-offs)	2	50	5
Bolton Wanderers	2024–25	League One	19	4	0	0	1	0	0	0	20	4
Bolton Wanderers	2025–26	League One	20	0	2	0	1	0	5	1	28	1
Bolton Wanderers	Total		138	12	7	0	4	0	20	5	169	17
Wycombe Wanderers (loan)	2024–25	League One	19	2	1	0	0	0	3	0	23	2
Wycombe Wanderers	2025–26	League One	3	1	0	0	0	0	0	0	3	1
Career total			253	21	17	2	11	1	35	5	316	29

== Honours ==
Bolton Wanderers

- EFL Trophy: 2022–23
