= Trinity Christian School =

Trinity Christian School may refer to:

== Australia ==
- Trinity Christian School, Canberra

== United States ==
Alphabetical by state, then town

- Trinity Christian School (Arkansas), Texarkana
- Trinity Christian School, Windsor, Connecticut
- Trinity Christian School, Dublin, Georgia
- Trinity Christian School (Sharpsburg, Georgia)
- Trinity Christian School, Concord, New Hampshire
- Trinity Christian School (New Jersey), Montville
- Trinity Christian School (Fayetteville, North Carolina)
- Trinity Christian School (Cedar Hill, Texas)
- Trinity Christian School, Claudville, Virginia
- Trinity Christian School (Fairfax, Virginia)
- Trinity Christian School (Morgantown, West Virginia)

== See also ==
- Trinity Christian Academy (disambiguation)
- Trinity Christian College, Palos Heights, Illinois, US
- Trinity Christian High School (disambiguation)
