= Larry Soderquist =

American author and law professor (1944–2005)

- Born: Ypsilanti, Michigan
- Died: August 20, 2005 (aged 61)
- Occupation: Professor of Law

Larry D. Soderquist (July 20, 1944 – August 20, 2005) was a noted author and Professor of Law at Vanderbilt University Law School from 1981 to 2005 and director at Corporate and Securities Law Institute from 1993 to 2005.

== Biography ==
Soderquist was born in Ypsilanti, Michigan and received his B.S. from Eastern Michigan University in 1966; his J.D. from Harvard in 1969; and his D.Min. from Trinity College of the Bible and Theological Seminary in 1998. Soderquist was an ordained minister. Before coming to Vanderbilt, Soderquist taught at the University of Notre Dame.

Prior to teaching, he was an Army Captain during the Vietnam War; after that, he practiced law on Wall Street with Milbank, Tweed, Hadley & McCloy. Soderquist was a Fulbright Scholar at Moscow State University during the Cold War. Other military positions include serving as chief intelligence officer on a General's staff.

Soderquist also penned two mystery novels outside of his academic work: The Labcoat (1998) and The Iraqi Provocation (2003).

On July 3, 2005, Soderquist was in a serious car accident and died from his injuries the next month, aged 61. He was interred at Arlington National Cemetery in Virginia.
