= Trinity School =

Trinity School may refer to:

== Australia ==
- Trinity College, Perth
- Trinity Grammar School (New South Wales), Summer Hill
- Trinity Grammar School Preparatory School, Strathfield
- Trinity Grammar School (Victoria), Kew

== Canada ==
- Trinity College School, a boarding school in Port Hope, Ontario

== United Kingdom ==
- Trinity School, Belvedere, Bexley, London, England
- Trinity School, Brentwood, Essex, England
- Trinity School, Carlisle, Cumbria, England
- Trinity School, Newbury, Berkshire, England
- Trinity School, Nottingham, England
- Trinity School, Teignmouth, Devon, England
- Trinity School of John Whitgift, Croydon, London, England
- Trinity Catholic School, Leamington Spa, England
- Trinity Church of England High School, Manchester, England
- Trinity Church of England School, Lewisham, London, England
- Woodside High School, Wood Green, formerly known as Trinity Grammar School

== United States ==
- Trinity School (New York City), New York
- Trinity School (Menlo Park), California
- Trinity Schools, Inc.
  - Trinity School at Greenlawn, South Bend, Indiana
  - Trinity School at Meadow View, Falls Church, Virginia
  - Trinity School at River Ridge, Eagan, Minnesota
- Trinity School for Children, a charter school in Tampa, Florida
- Trinity School of Durham and Chapel Hill, Durham, North Carolina
- Blessed Trinity Catholic High School, Roswell, Georgia
- Trinity Episcopal Day School, Natchez, Mississippi
- Trinity Preparatory School, Florida
- Trinity Presbyterian School, Montgomery, Alabama
- Trinity Valley School, Fort Worth, Texas

== See also ==
- Trinity College (disambiguation)
- Trinity High School (disambiguation)
- Trinity University (disambiguation)
- Holy Trinity High School (disambiguation)
- Holy Trinity Catholic High School (disambiguation)
- Trinity Christian High School (disambiguation)
