= Trinity Hall =

Trinity Hall may refer to:

- Trinity Hall, Cambridge, a constituent college of the University of Cambridge
- Trinity Hall, Dublin, a hall of residence of Trinity College Dublin
- Trinity Hall (New Jersey), high school in Tinton Falls, New Jersey
- Trinity Hall (Winterton, Newfoundland and Labrador), event centre and former church in Newfoundland and Labrador
- Trinity Hall, a historic building within the campus of Trinity High School in Washington, Pennsylvania

== See also ==
- Trinity College (disambiguation)
