= Robert Sánchez =

Spanish footballer (born 1997)

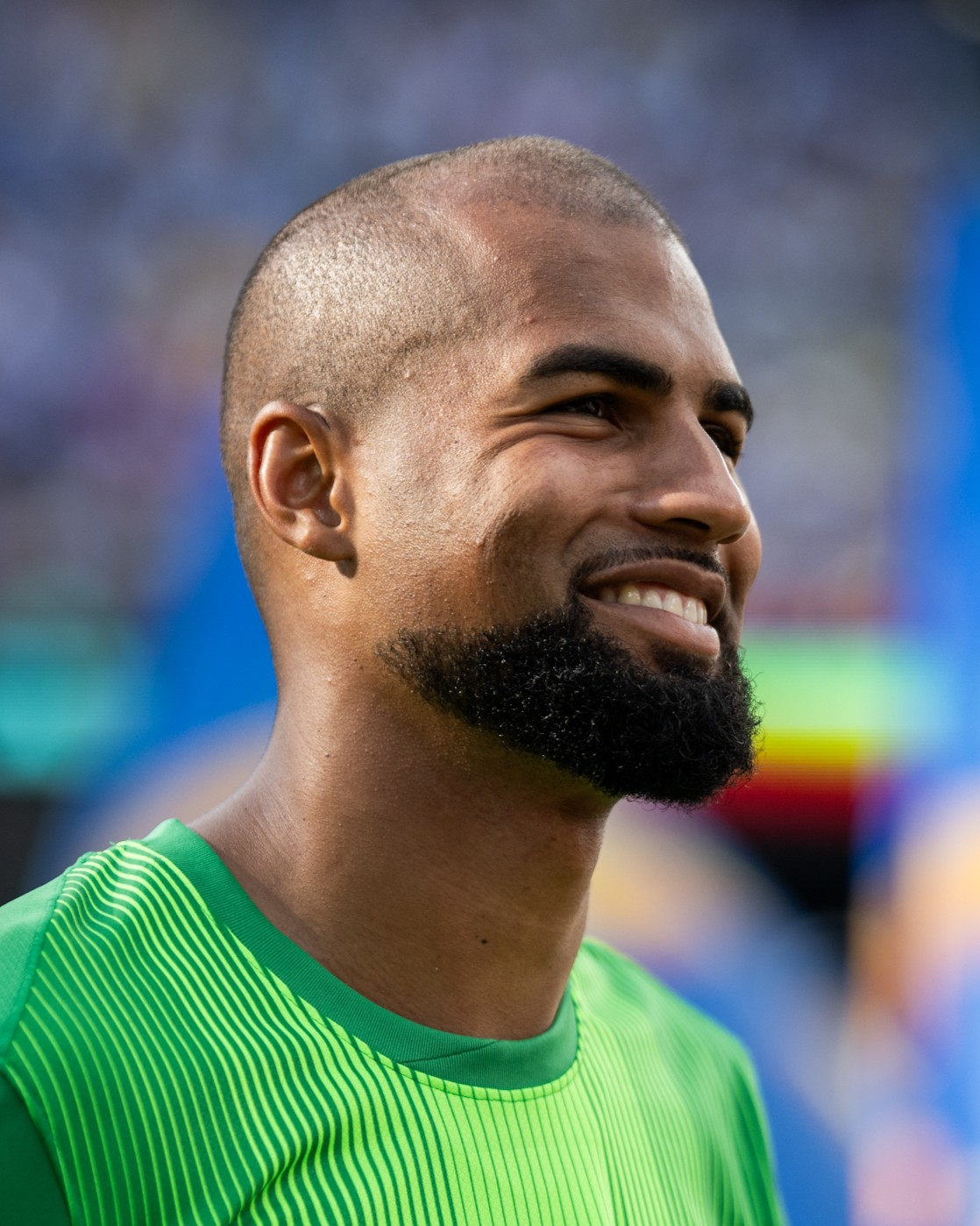
- Sánchez with Chelsea in 2025

Personal information
- Full name: Robert Lynch Sánchez
- Date of birth: 18 November 1997 (age 28)
- Place of birth: Cartagena, Spain
- Height: 1.97 m (6 ft 6 in)
- Position: Goalkeeper

Team information
- Current team: Como (on loan from Chelsea)
- Number: 97

Youth career
- Escuela de Fútbol de Santa Ana
- Cartagena
- Ciudad Jardín
- 2010–2013: Levante
- 2013–2018: Brighton & Hove Albion

Senior career*
Years	Team	Apps	(Gls)
2018–2023	Brighton & Hove Albion	87	(0)
2018–2019	→ Forest Green Rovers (loan)	17	(0)
2019–2020	→ Rochdale (loan)	26	(0)
2023–	Chelsea	84	(0)
2026–	→ Como (loan)	3	(0)

International career^{‡}
2021–2024	Spain	2	(0)
Medal record
Men's football
Representing Spain
UEFA Nations League
Runner-up	2021 Italy
UEFA European Championship
Bronze medal – third place	2020 Europe
- * Club domestic league appearances and goals as of 20:59, 8 November 2026 (UTC) ‡ National team caps and goals as of 23:12, 18 November 2024 (UTC)

Robert Lynch Sánchez (born 18 November 1997) is a Spanish professional footballer who plays as a goalkeeper for Serie A club Como, on loan from Premier League club Chelsea.

Sánchez played youth football in his native Spain for clubs including Cartagena and Levante before moving to English club Brighton & Hove Albion. He made his senior debut on loan at Forest Green Rovers, and also spent time on loan at Rochdale, before signing for Chelsea. He moved on loan to Italian club Como in 2026.

Sánchez earned 2 international caps for Spain, and was a squad member at the UEFA Euro 2020.

== Club career ==
=== Early life and career ===
Sánchez was born in Cartagena, Region of Murcia. He was born to a Jamaican-English father and a Spanish-French mother. He spent his early career playing locally with Escuela de Fútbol de Santa Ana, Cartagena and Ciudad Jardín before joining Levante in 2010.

=== Brighton & Hove Albion ===
Sánchez moved to England to sign for Brighton & Hove Albion at the age of 15, before signing his first professional contract in June 2015. He signed a new three-year contract with the club in April 2018.

==== Loan spells ====
In June 2018, Sánchez moved on loan to Forest Green Rovers for the 2018–19 season. He played in the opening game of the season making his debut away at Grimsby where Rovers won 4–1. Sánchez was recalled by parent club Brighton in January 2019 to provide cover as Albion's Mathew Ryan was called up for Australia for the Asian Cup. He made 17 appearances for Forest Green that season, all coming in the league.

On 24 July 2019, Sánchez joined Rochdale on loan for the 2019–20 season. He made his debut for the club in a 3–2 away win over Tranmere Rovers.

==== Return to Brighton ====
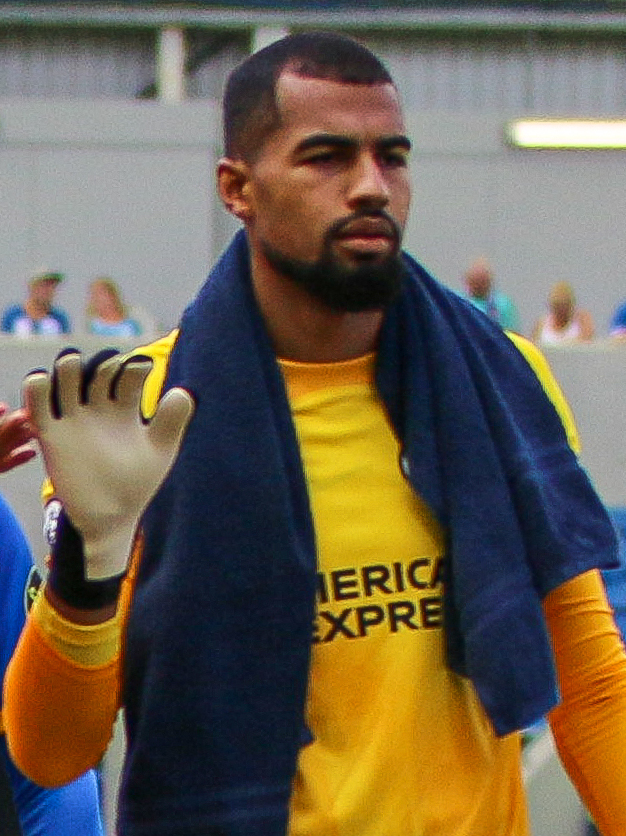
Sánchez with Brighton & Hove Albion in 2022.

On 1 November 2020, Sánchez made his Brighton debut, playing in a 2–1 defeat in a Premier League match against Tottenham Hotspur. On 23 February 2021, Sánchez signed a new four-and-a-half-year contract with Brighton, running until June 2025.

Sánchez was sent off in the 1–1 home draw against Newcastle United on 6 November, in Brighton's eleventh match of the 2021–22 season, for fouling Callum Wilson who was within a goalscoring opportunity. He kept a clean sheet in the 4–0 win over Manchester United on 7 May 2022, helping Brighton earn their record top flight victory, with his long-range pass providing a crucial role in Pascal Groß's goal.

In the second half of the 2022–23 season Sánchez lost his number one spot to long standing back-up keeper Jason Steele, with Brighton head coach Roberto De Zerbi saying that "he is sad for Robert" and that he has "one of the best relationships" with the player. He was selected to play instead of Steele on 19 March, keeping a clean sheet in the 5–0 FA Cup quarter-final win over League Two side Grimsby at Falmer Stadium. On 15 April, with Steele injured, Sánchez played against Chelsea in a 2–1 away win. Eight days later he retained his place, keeping a clean sheet against Manchester United in 120 minutes of play in the FA Cup semi-final at Wembley, but failing to save a penalty in the eventual shootout loss.

=== Chelsea ===
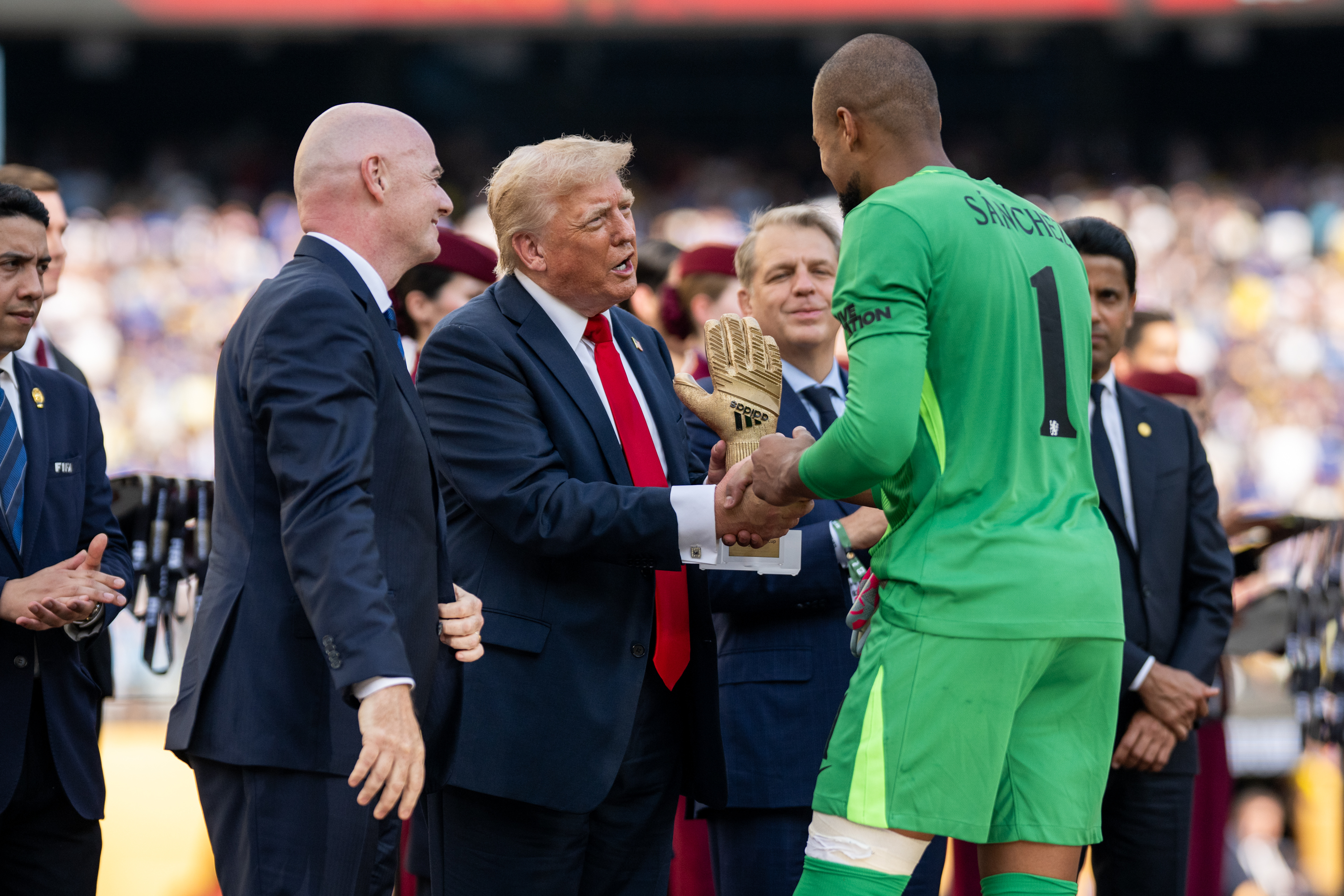
Sánchez receiving the 2025 FIFA Club World Cup Golden Glove award from U.S. president Donald Trump

On 3 August 2023, it was reported that Brighton had agreed a transfer fee, with fellow Premier League club Chelsea, worth an initial £20 million, plus £5 million in add-ons, for Sánchez. The transfer was completed on 5 August, with the player signing a seven-year contract. On 8 August, Chelsea confirmed that he would wear the vacant number 31 shirt for the upcoming 2023–24 season. On 13 August, he made his debut for the club in a 1–1 draw against Liverpool in the Premier League. Following Kepa Arrizabalaga's loan move to Real Madrid, on 17 August, Sánchez opted to switch his shirt number to No.1.

In October 2023, he was described by pundit Karen Bardsley as possibly "Chelsea's smartest signing" due to "the positive effect he's had on a team which is in transition". By January 2025, new Chelsea manager Enzo Maresca said he was considering dropping Sánchez, following a series of errors.

On 13 July 2025, Sánchez won the 2025 FIFA Club World Cup final in a 3–0 victory over Paris Saint-Germain. He was widely praised for his performance in the final, making several key saves to preserve the clean sheet, thus helping him win the tournament's Golden Glove award. On 20 September, Sánchez was given a straight red card for a foul on Bryan Mbeumo outside the box just 5 minutes into the first half. This was the second time that he has been dismissed in nearly four years. In his absence, Chelsea went on to lose 2–1 to Manchester United.

==== Loan to Como ====
In August 2026, Chelsea accepted a transfer bid from Italian club Como for Sánchez, and he signed a season-long loan deal with Como on 1 September 2026.

== International career ==
Sánchez received his first call-up to the Spain national team in March 2021, for 2022 FIFA World Cup qualification matches against Greece, Georgia and Kosovo.

He was selected to the Spain squad for the delayed UEFA Euro 2020 tournament in May 2021. Sánchez and David de Gea remained as understudies to Unai Simón and did not make an appearance as Spain were knocked out on penalties against Italy in the semi-final at Wembley Stadium on 6 July.

He made his international debut on 5 September 2021, replacing Simón in the second half of a World Cup qualifier 4–0 win against Georgia in Badajoz.

Sánchez was part of Spain's 2021 UEFA Nations League Finals squad in October. He remained as back-up and did not make an appearance in either the semi-final victory over Italy or the final loss against France as Spain finished as runners-up.

On 11 November 2022, Sánchez was named in Spain's 26-man squad for the 2022 FIFA World Cup, but he was not called up for UEFA Euro 2024.

== Style of play ==
Sánchez has said that he modelled himself on Spanish goalkeepers Iker Casillas and David de Gea.

== Career statistics ==
=== Club ===
As of match played 14 October 2026

Appearances and goals by club, season and competition
Club	Season	League			National cup		League cup		Europe		Other		Total	
Club	Season	Division	Apps	Goals	Apps	Goals	Apps	Goals	Apps	Goals	Apps	Goals	Apps	Goals
Brighton & Hove Albion U21	2016–17	—			—		—		—		3 (Note: Appearances in EFL Trophy)	0	3	0
Brighton & Hove Albion U21	2017–18	—			—		—		—		2	0	2	0
Brighton & Hove Albion U21	Total		—		—		—		—		5	0	5	0
Brighton & Hove Albion	2018–19	Premier League	0	0	0	0	—		—		—		0	0
Brighton & Hove Albion	2019–20	Premier League	0	0	—		—		—		—		0	0
Brighton & Hove Albion	2020–21	Premier League	27	0	0	0	0	0	—		—		27	0
Brighton & Hove Albion	2021–22	Premier League	37	0	1	0	0	0	—		—		38	0
Brighton & Hove Albion	2022–23	Premier League	23	0	2	0	0	0	—		—		25	0
Brighton & Hove Albion	Total		87	0	3	0	0	0	0	0	0	0	90	0
Forest Green Rovers (loan)	2018–19	League Two	17	0	0	0	0	0	—		0	0	17	0
Rochdale (loan)	2019–20	League One	26	0	6	0	3	0	—		0	0	35	0
Chelsea	2023–24	Premier League	16	0	2	0	3	0	—		—		21	0
Chelsea	2024–25	Premier League	32	0	1	0	0	0	1 (Note: Appearance in UEFA Conference League)	0	6 (Note: Appearances in FIFA Club World Cup)	0	40	0
Chelsea	2025–26	Premier League	35	0	5	0	2	0	8 (Note: Appearances in UEFA Champions League)	0	—		50	0
Chelsea	2026–27	Premier League	1	0	0	0	0	0	—		—		1	0
Chelsea	Total		84	0	8	0	5	0	9	0	6	0	112	0
Como (loan)	2026–27	Serie A	1	0	0	0	—		1	0	—		2	0
Career total			215	0	17	0	8	0	10	0	11	0	261	0

=== International ===
As of match played 18 November 2024

Appearances and goals by national team and year
National team	Year	Apps	Goals
Spain	2021	1	0
Spain	2024	1	0
Total		2	0

== Honours ==
Chelsea

- UEFA Conference League: 2024–25
- FIFA Club World Cup: 2025
- FA Cup runner-up: 2025–26
- EFL Cup runner-up: 2023–24

Spain

- UEFA Nations League runner-up: 2020–21

Individual

- Premier League Save of the Month: September 2023, October 2024
- FIFA Club World Cup Golden Glove: 2025
