= Trinity Seminary =

Trinity Seminary may refer to:

- Holy Trinity Seminary, a Roman Catholic seminary in Texas.
- Holy Trinity College and Seminary, a Southern Episcopal seminary in Florida.
- Holy Trinity Orthodox Seminary, a Russian Orthodox seminary in New York.
- Trinity Lutheran Seminary, a Lutheran seminary in Ohio.
- Trinity Evangelical Divinity School, an Evangelical seminary in Illinois.
- Trinity Episcopal School for Ministry, an Episcopal seminary in Pennsylvania.
- Trinity Seminary, a Danish Lutheran seminary in Nebraska that merged with Wartburg Theological Seminary in Iowa.
- Trinity College and Seminary, in Newburgh, Indiana

== See also ==
- Trinity Theological College (disambiguation)
- Trinity Theological Seminary (disambiguation)
