= Trinity College =

Trinity College may refer to:

== Australia ==
- Trinity Anglican College, an Anglican coeducational primary and secondary school in Albury, New South Wales
- Trinity Catholic College, Auburn, a coeducational school in the inner-western suburbs of Sydney, New South Wales
- Trinity Catholic College, Goulburn, a coeducational school in the Southern Tablelands, New South Wales
- Trinity Catholic College, Lismore, a coeducational school in northeastern New South Wales
- Trinity College Queensland, a theological college of the Uniting Church in Australia, in Auchenflower, Brisbane
- Trinity College, Beenleigh, a Roman Catholic coeducational school in Queensland
- Trinity College Colac, in Colac, Victoria
- Trinity College, Gawler, a coeducational multi-school college in South Australia
- Trinity College, Melbourne, a residential college of the university of Melbourne
- Trinity College, Perth, a Roman Catholic boys' school in Western Australia
- Trinity Lutheran College (Queensland), a coeducational school in Ashmore, on the Gold Coast
- Trinity Residential College, a residential college of the University of Western Australia in Perth
- Trinity Theological College, Perth, an evangelical Christian college in Western Australia

== Canada ==
- Trinity College, Toronto, a federated university of the University of Toronto, in Ontario
- Trinity College School, in Port Hope, Ontario
- Trinity Western College, former name of Trinity Western University in Langley, British Columbia

== Ireland ==
- Trinity College Dublin, the sole constituent college of the University of Dublin

== New Zealand ==
- Trinity Catholic College, Dunedin, a school in Dunedin, New Zealand

== United Kingdom ==
In the UK, Trinity College is generally used as a term to refer to the colleges at one of the English ancient universities:

- Trinity College, Cambridge, a constituent college of the University of Cambridge
- Trinity College, Oxford, a constituent college of the University of Oxford

It may also refer to:

- Trinity College, Bristol, an Anglican theological college
- Trinity College, Carmarthen, former name of Trinity University College, now merged into the University of Wales Trinity Saint David
- Trinity College, Glasgow, a Church of Scotland institution within the University of Glasgow supervising candidates for ministry
- Trinity College, Glenalmond, former name of Glenalmond College in Perthshire
- Trinity College London, an examination board formerly associated with Trinity College of Music
- Trinity College Kirk, also known as Trinity College Church, the remnants of a medieval collegiate foundation in Edinburgh
- Trinity College of Music, in Greenwich, Greater London, now merged into Trinity Laban Conservatoire of Music and Dance
- Trinity Catholic College, Middlesbrough, a school in North Yorkshire

== United States ==
- Trinity Baptist College, in Jacksonville, Florida
- Trinity Bible College and Graduate School, in Ellendale, North Dakota
- Trinity Christian College, in Palos Heights, Illinois
- Trinity College and University, former name of Bronte International University, previously based in South Dakota
- Trinity College (Connecticut), a liberal arts college in Hartford
- Trinity College of Arts and Sciences in Durham, North Carolina; Duke University's undergraduate liberal arts college ("Trinity College" was the former name of the entire university)
- Trinity College of the Bible and Theological Seminary, in Newburgh, Indiana
- Trinity College of Florida, a Bible college in New Port Richey
- Trinity College of Vermont, formerly a women's college in Burlington
- Trinity College, former name of Trinity Washington University in Washington, D.C.
- Trinity College, the undergraduate school of Trinity International University, Deerfield, Illinois
- Trinity College, in Miami, Florida, now merged into Trinity International University as its Florida campus
- Trinity Lutheran College (Washington), in Seattle
- Trinity School (Athens, Alabama), a historical school for African Americans

== Other locations ==
- Trinity College and University, former name of Bronte International University, based in Tortola, British Virgin Islands
- Trinity College Foochow, the precursor of Fuzhou Foreign Language School, in Fujian, China
- Trinity College Nabbingo, a secondary school in the Central Region of Uganda
- Trinity College of Quezon City, former name of Trinity University of Asia in the Philippines
- Trinity College Rancagua, a high school in Cachapoal Province, Chile
- Trinity College Rome Campus, in Italy, an overseas residential programme of the Trinity College in Connecticut, U.S.
- Trinity College, Kandy, a secondary school in Sri Lanka
- Trinity College, Leuven, formerly a college of the old University of Leuven, in Brabant, modern-day Belgium
- Trinity College, Moka, a secondary school in Maraval, Trinidad and Tobago
- Trinity Theological College, Singapore, an ecumenical Christian college
- Trinity International College, a college in Kathmandu, Nepal

== See also ==
- Holy Trinity College (disambiguation)
- Trinity Hall (disambiguation)
- Trinity High School (disambiguation)
- Trinity School (disambiguation)
- Trinity University (disambiguation)
- Trinity Seminary (disambiguation)
