= Bronte International University =

- Academic staff: None
- Location: Tortola, British Virgin Islands
- Campus: None

Bronte International University (formerly known as Trinity College and University) is an unaccredited post-secondary educational institution formerly in South Dakota. It is widely considered to be a diploma mill, operated from an unknown location. Its website offers "fast" degrees for "life experience."

The Trinity College and University that was based in South Dakota and later became Bronte International University is currently based in Tortola, the British Virgin Islands, and is registered as a corporation with the United Kingdom.

== Location ==
The Skeptical Inquirer described it as "a British institution with no building, campus, faculty, or president, and run from a post office box in Sioux Falls, South Dakota." According to the Oregon State Office of Degree Authorization, it is "probably" operated in the Caribbean and "also operated in Louisiana and maybe elsewhere."

== Academics and accreditation status ==
The institution claims to be accredited by the Association for Online Academic Excellence (AOAE), but this is not a recognized accreditation association of higher learning. It has been listed as a diploma mill by the American Association of Collegiate Registrars and Admissions Officers.

Course descriptions found on the institution's now defunct website were copied verbatim from the course offerings of Thomas Edison State College of Trenton, New Jersey.

== Other institutions with similar names ==
Bronte International University was originally known as "Trinity College and University." It should not be confused with a number of mainstream academic institutions with similar names (see Trinity College).

Trinity College and University offered bachelor's degrees on the basis of "Prior Learning Assessment," advertising that a degree awarded on this basis could be completed in as little as two days' time. Bachelor's degrees were priced at $675.

The name "Trinity College and University" is also used by a distance education institution based in Dover, Delaware, United States, with offices in Málaga, Spain and Islamabad, Pakistan. This institution is a known diploma mill now. and advertises that it awards degrees "in any subject" on the basis of "practical experience".

== United Nations scandal ==
In February 2007, the Associated Press reported that several employees of the United Nations had lost their jobs when it was revealed they had listed Trinity College and University degrees on their resumes. A representative of the UN was quoted as saying that one staff member's misrepresentation of his Trinity credentials as being from a legitimate university was considered "serious misconduct." The article described Trinity as a "diploma-sales business" and noted that the institution was "actively pursuing the soldiers in Iraq" as customers for college degrees.

== See also ==
- List of unaccredited institutions of higher learning
- Educational accreditation
