= Trinity Christian Academy =

Trinity Christian Academy may refer to:

- Trinity Christian Academy (Deltona, Florida)
- Trinity Christian Academy (Jacksonville, Florida)
- Trinity Christian Academy (Jackson, Tennessee)
- Trinity Christian Academy (Addison, Texas)

== See also ==
- Trinity Classical Academy
