= Trinity Catholic High School (Kansas) =

Trinity Catholic Jr./Sr. High School
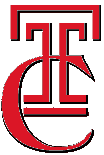

Location
- 1400 East 17th Street; Hutchinson, Kansas 67501; United States; 38°4′22″N 97°54′12″W

Information
- Type: Private, coeducational
- Religious affiliation: Roman Catholic
- Established: 1968; 58 years ago
- Superintendent: Janet Eaton
- Principal: Joseph Godina
- Chaplain: Rev. Will Steuver
- Grades: 7–12
- Hours in school day: 8
- Colors: Red, white and Columbia blue
- Fight song: Notre Dame March
- Athletics conference: Heart of America League
- Mascot: Celtic
- Team name: Celtics
- Website: trinity-hutch.com

Trinity Catholic Jr./Sr. High School is a parochial, Roman Catholic junior/senior high school in Hutchinson, Kansas, United States. It is located within the Roman Catholic Diocese of Wichita. The school has classes from grades 7 through 12. For sports, it is classified as a 2A school with around 250 students. The school's principal is Joseph Godina.

== Extracurricular activities ==
The school is classified as a 2A school in Kansas according to the Kansas State High School Activities Association. During its history, Trinity Catholic has won nine state championships in various sports.

=== Athletics ===
Trinity Catholic Jr./Sr. High School offers the following sports:

- Fall: football, volleyball, boys' cross country, girls' cross country, girls' tennis, cheerleading
- Winter: boys' basketball, girls' basketball, dance team, cheerleading
- Spring: boys' golf, girls golf, boys' tennis, softball, baseball, boys' track and field, girls' track and field

=== State championships ===
State championships
Season	Sport	Number of championships	Year
Fall	American football	1	1979
Fall	Cross country, boys'	3	2000, 2002, 2012
Fall	Cross country, girls'	2	2001, 2002
Winter	Basketball, boys'	1	1987
Spring	Golf, boys'	1	2005
Spring	Track, boys'	1	2011
Total		9	

== See also ==
- List of high schools in Kansas
- List of unified school districts in Kansas
