= Trinity Church of England High School =

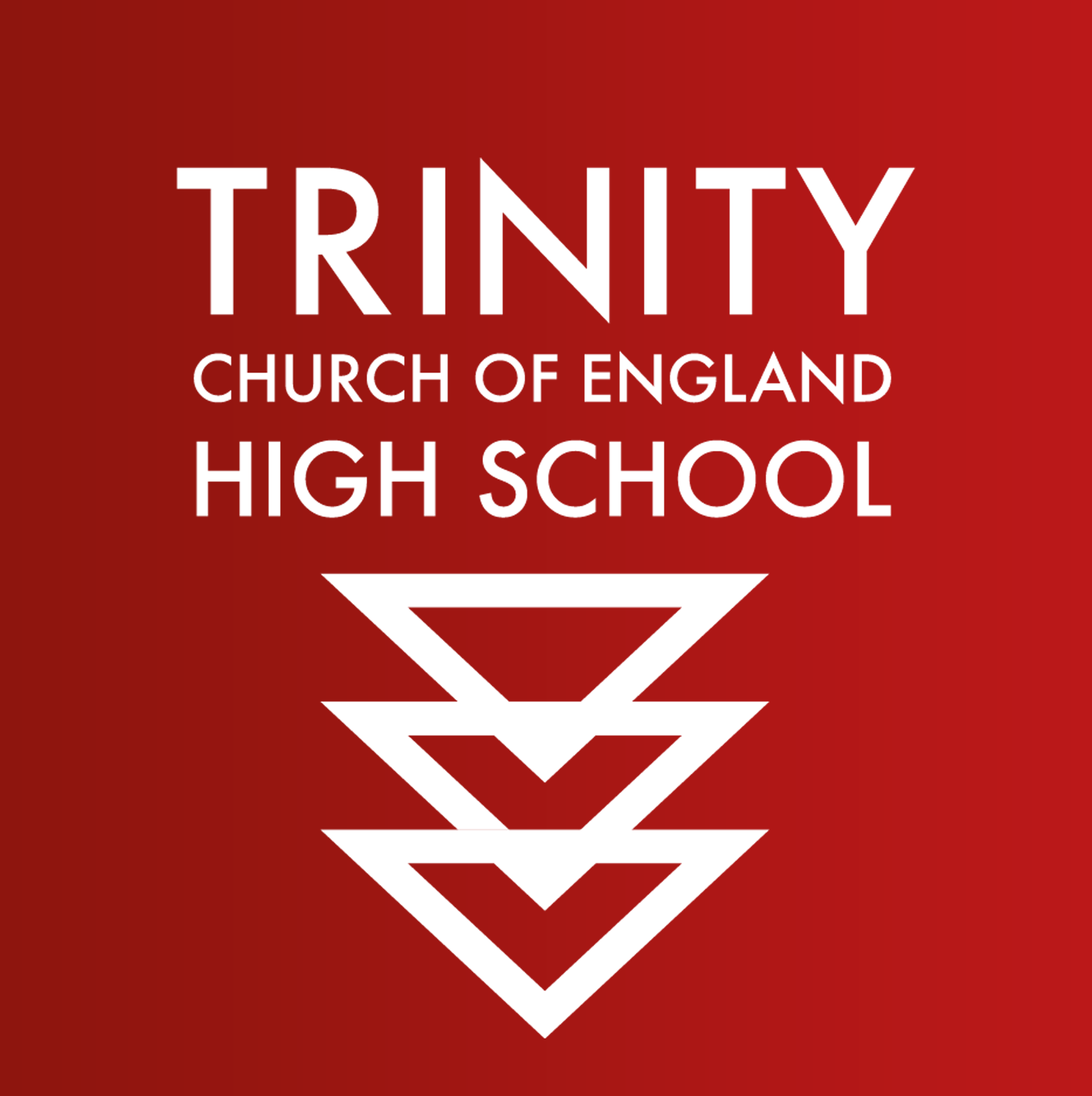

Location
- Higher Cambridge Street; Manchester, Greater Manchester, M15 6HP; England
- 53°27′56″N 2°14′20″W

Information
- Type: Academy
- Motto: Faith in the City, Value in People, Excellence in Education
- Religious affiliation: Church of England
- Department for Education URN: 137801 Tables
- Ofsted: Reports
- Headteacher: Julian Nicholls
- Gender: Coeducational
- Age: 11 to 18
- Enrolment: 1428
- Colours: Red, white, black
- Publication: Trinity Weekly (Newsletter)
- Website: www.trinityhigh.com

Trinity Church of England High School, also known as Trinity CE High School, is an academy school located in Hulme, Manchester, England. The headteacher is Julian Nicholls. The school is in between Higher Cambridge Street and Boundary Lane near the University of Manchester's Oxford Road campus.

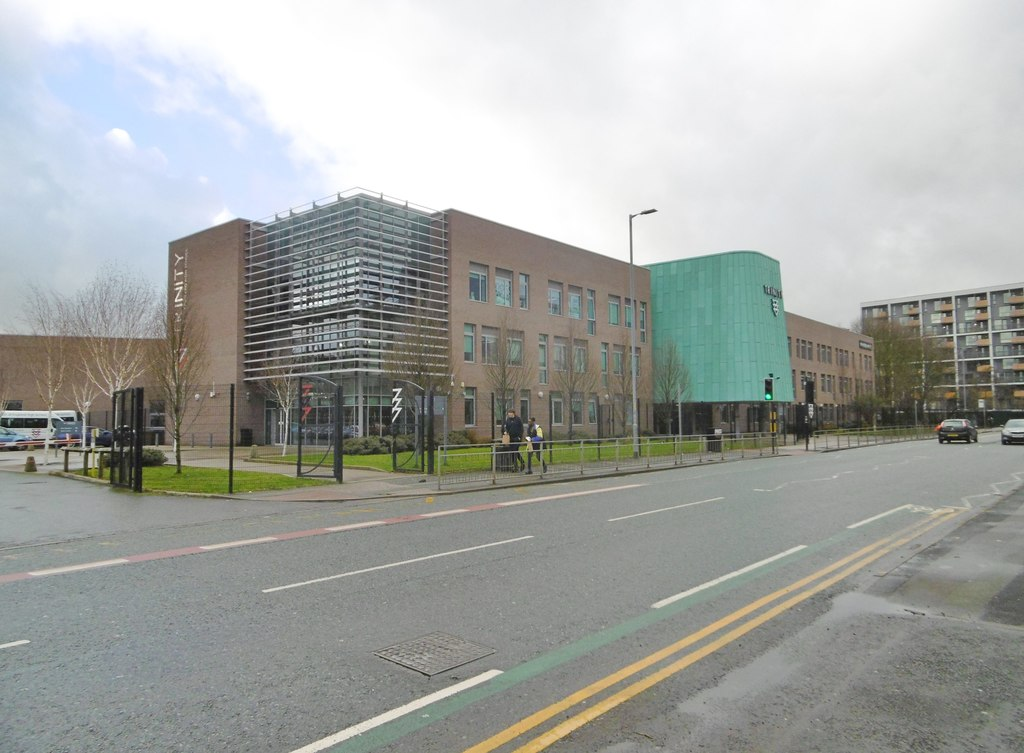
Trinity C of E High School

The school was formed in 1984 on the closure of Bishop Greer and Fallowfield Church of England High Schools. A substantial rebuilding project was completed in 2011 (costing £21million), with the new building fronting Higher Cambridge Street, which expanded the school. In 2014, the school announced a £4 million project to create a sixth form centre on site. Work began in the summer of 2014, with the first intake in September 2016.

The school takes in pupils from Manchester and its surrounding areas. It has Technology College status and is a Leading Edge School.

== Notable former pupils ==
- Luke Matheson (footballer)
- Misha B (singer)
- Wunmi Mosaku (actress)
