= Lewis Bradley (footballer) =

English footballer (born 2001)

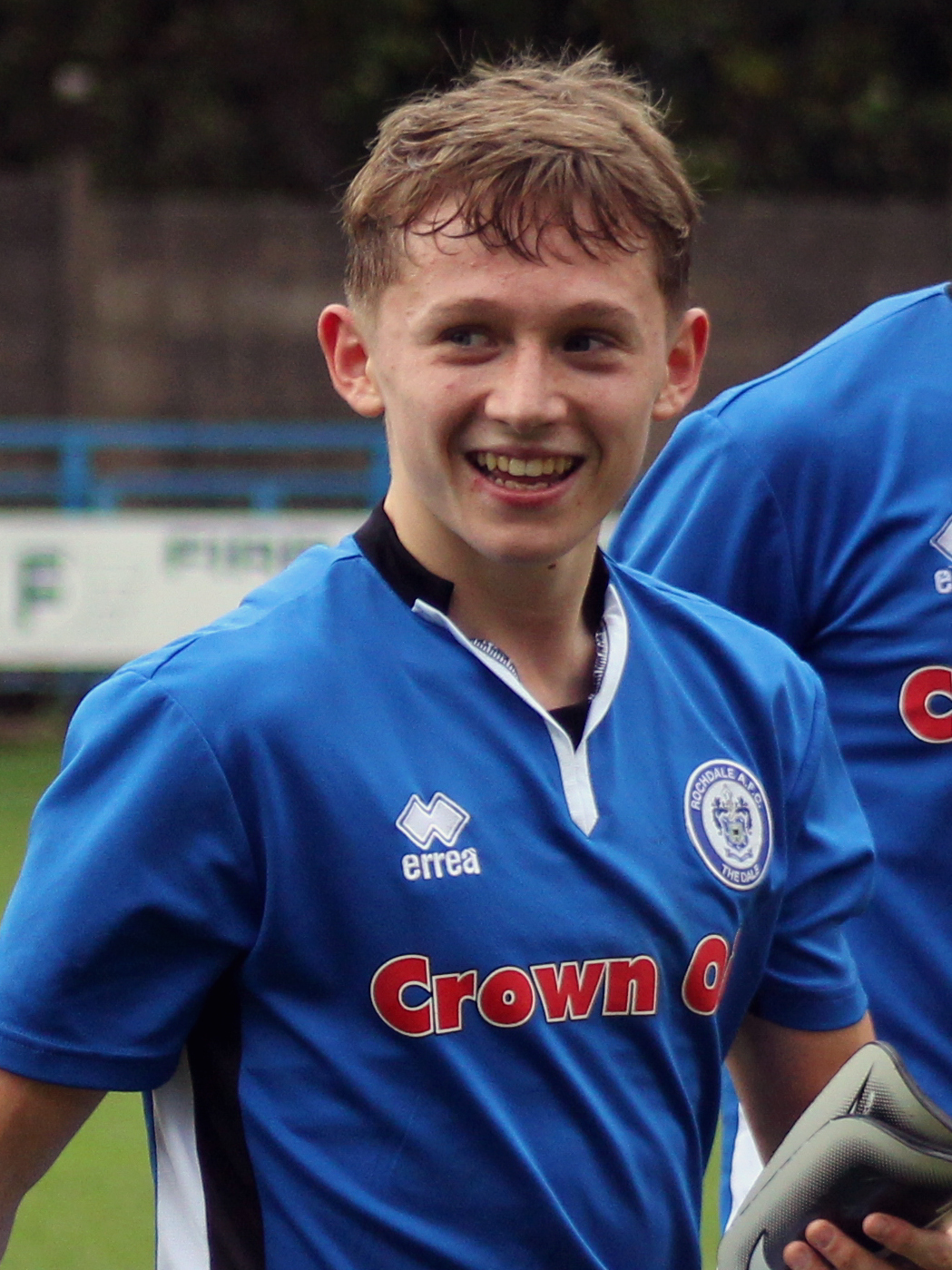
- Bradley playing for Rochdale U18 in October 2017

Personal information
- Full name: Lewis Derek Bradley
- Date of birth: 29 May 2001 (age 25)
- Place of birth: Stockport, England
- Height: 5 ft 7 in (1.70 m)
- Position: Midfielder

Team information
- Current team: 1874 Northwich

Youth career
- Rochdale

Senior career*
Years	Team	Apps	(Gls)
2018–2021	Rochdale	2	(0)
2020	→ Colne (loan)		
2020	→ Bradford (Park Avenue) (loan)	2	(0)
2021	Stockport Town		
2021	Glossop North End		
2021	Alsager Town		(0)
2021	Atherton LR		(0)
2023-	1874 Northwich	2	(0)
- * Club domestic league appearances and goals as of 20:51, 13 February 2024 (UTC)

Lewis Derek Bradley (born 29 May 2001) is an English professional footballer who plays as a midfielder for 1874 Northwich.

== Career ==
On 4 May 2019, Bradley made his debut, as a substitute, for Rochdale in a 4–0 EFL League One defeat against Charlton Athletic.

In February 2020 he joined Colne on loan making his debut for the club a few days later in a match against City of Liverpool.

In September 2020, he joined Bradford (Park Avenue) on loan until the end of October.

In December 2023, Bradley became Damian Crossley's first permanent signing as manager of 1874 Northwich.
