= Trinity College of the Bible and Theological Seminary =

- Motto: And the things that thou hast heard of me among many witnesses; the same commit thou to faithful men, who shall be able to teach others also. (II Timothy 2:2, KJV)
- Type: Unaccredited Private, Seminary
- Established: 1969
- President: Braxton Hunter
- Location: Newburgh, Indiana, United States; 37.973094°N 87.393933°W
- Courses: Independent Study, Online Course, Webinar/Seminar
- Colors: Royal Blue and Silver Gray
- Website: www.trinitysem.edu

Trinity College of the Bible and Theological Seminary, also known as Trinity College of the Bible, is a conservative evangelical Bible college and seminary located near Evansville, Indiana. Trinity offers distance education programs at undergraduate, graduate, and doctoral degree levels for self-directed adult learners. Programs include Certificate, Associate, Bachelor, Master, and Doctorate (D.Min., D.R.S., and Ph.D.) studies. In 2006, Trinity claimed more than 7,000 active students worldwide.

== History ==
In April 1969, John D. Brooke founded Trinity College and Theological Seminary and in mid-1978, Trinity moved to metropolitan Evansville, Indiana, and changed its focus from offering traditional on-campus degree programs to its current emphasis on distance education, providing undergraduate, graduate and post-graduate courses for self-directed adult learners. Trinity offers various distance education learning formats and delivery systems, such as self-paced independent study courses, online courses, webinars, and face-to-face seminars on-campus and at other locations in the United States. In 1981, the school relocated to Newburgh and currently has a nine-building campus. In 2017 Trinity relocated to downtown Evansville, Indiana along the Ohio river. Their current address is PO Box 1107, Evansville, Indiana 47706. Google maps places it on Sycamor St. in Evansville.

As of 2013, Trinity lists about 70 faculty.

== Credentials ==
Trinity College of the Bible and Theological Seminary is authorized and approved to grant degrees in the State of Indiana under Article I, Sections 2, 3, and 4, of the Indiana State Constitution and is recognized as a 501(c)(3) organization as stated in the Internal Revenue Service letter of determination dated February 24, 1970.

In January 1992, Trinity was accredited by the National Association of Private Nontraditional Schools and Colleges, an organization that went defunct around 2010, that was not recognized as an accreditor by the United States Department of Education or the Council for Higher Education Accreditation. As such, its degrees and credits might not be acceptable to employers or other institutions, and use of degree titles may be restricted or illegal in some jurisdictions. However, Trinity's articulation agreements with certain accredited schools allows for many graduates to move on from their Trinity education to earn degrees from those accredited institutions .

=== Connections to universities in the United Kingdom ===
==== University of Liverpool (prior to 2002) ====
Trinity pursued endorsement of its courses with the University of Liverpool. Trinity's theology programs were placed in the Faculty of the Arts Program. In 2002, Liverpool decided to "transfer the accreditation role to a theologically orientated institution" after consultation with the QAA, which oversees the academic infrastructure of institutions, including frameworks for higher education qualifications, code of practice, subject benchmark statements, and program specifications.

==== Canterbury Christ Church University (2002–2007) ====
From 2002 to 2007, Canterbury Christ Church University, whose chancellor is the Archbishop of Canterbury, endorsed courses and programs offered by Trinity.

==== University of Wales (2007–2008) ====
In August 2007, Trinity received support for set courses and programs by the University of Wales. Validation with the university is awarded to an institution developing and delivering a program of study equivalent to the quality and standard followed by the university. The validation made it possible for Trinity to offer degrees from the University of Wales—rather than from Trinity itself—up to the graduate level. To be awarded validation, Trinity was required to document and satisfy all quality assurance standards as outlined by the university, which includes QAA national standards related to the framework for higher education qualifications, program specifications, subject benchmark statements, and code of practice.

At the time of validation in 2007, there was no requirement for the university to work only with accredited institutions. However, in July 2008 the QAA advised U.K. institutions they should not form collaborative relationships with institutions not accredited in their home country. This prompted the university to begin to question their collaborative relationship with Trinity. Although Trinity successfully completed the validation process in order to achieve validation, in November 2008 the university cut ties with Trinity.

=== Higher Learning Commission candidacy ===
In 2004, Trinity was granted candidacy status with the Higher Learning Commission of the North Central Association of Colleges and Schools. The institution provided a self-study report, hosted a team of North Central Association evaluators for a site visit, and expected a second campus visit in autumn 2006. However, Trinity resigned from candidacy status effective October 20, 2006. This choice was made after the HLC continually went back and forth on Trinity, costing multiple thousands of dollars each year.

=== Distance Education Accrediting Commission candidacy ===
In 2008, Trinity applied for accreditation with the Distance Education Training Council (DETC), which is recognized by the CHEA and the United States Department of Education (USDE). On October 7, 2011, DETC denied initial accreditation to Trinity citing Trinity's "failure to demonstrate compliance with Standard IX (Financial Responsibility)" as the reason for DETC's denial. Trinity did not appeal DETC's decision, but disagreed with the DETC commissioners' decision, noting the demonstrated confidence of Trinity's banking institution. Trinity's comments also noted that it had complied with all other requirements, including all academic standards, for DETC accreditation and that Trinity would continue seeking accreditation.

Trinity is not accredited by any regional or national accrediting agency.

Trinity has articulation agreements with Calvary University in Missouri and the B.H. Carroll Theological Institute of Texas.

== Notable faculty ==
- John Warwick Montgomery was Professor of Apologetics and vice-president for Academic Affairs, UK and Europe.
- Stephen Olford was Professor of Expository Preaching and Sermon Development until his death in 2004.

== Notable alumni ==
- Kim Hammer - Republican member of the Arkansas House of Representatives; hospice chaplain in Benton, Arkansas
- Sam Seamans - Bishop, Reformed Episcopal Church.
- Larry D. Soderquist - author and law professor at Vanderbilt University Law School, director at Corporate and Securities Law Institute from 1993 to 2005.
- Skip Heitzig - founder and senior pastor of Calvary of Albuquerque, a Calvary Chapel fellowship located in Albuquerque, New Mexico.
- Ted Barrett - Major League Baseball umpire
