= 2018–19 Lee Man FC season =

Lee Man FC 2018–19
- President: Norman Lee
- Head Coach: Chan Hiu Ming
- Stadium: Tseung Kwan O Sports Ground
- Premier League: 9th
- Senior Shield: Quarter-finals
- FA Cup: Quarter-finals
- Sapling Cup: Winners
- Top goalscorer: League: Leong Ka Hang (3); All: Fran González (7)
- Highest home attendance: 1,952 (vs Kitchee SC, 31 August 2018)
- Lowest home attendance: 264 (vs Hoi King, 19 May 2019)
- Average home league attendance: 626
Home colours	Away colours

The 2018-19 season is Lee Man's second consecutive season in Hong Kong Premier League.

== Squad ==
As of 9 March 2019

Note: Flags indicate national team as defined under FIFA eligibility rules; some limited exceptions apply. Players may hold more than one non-FIFA nationality.

No.	Pos.	Nation	Player
3	DF	TPE	Chen Ting-yang ^{FP}
5	DF	ESP	Fran González (captain) ^{FP}
6	DF	HKG	Yu Wai Lim
7	FW	BRA	Stefan ^{FP}
8	MF	HKG	Tam Lok Hin
10	FW	FRA	Michaël N'dri ^{FP}
11	FW	HKG	Cheng Siu Kwan
12	FW	HKG	Lai Yiu Cheong
14	DF	HKG	Fong Pak Lun
15	MF	HKG	Wong Chun Hin (on loan from Eastern)
16	MF	HKG	Ngan Lok Fung (vice-captain)
17	MF	HKG	Chow Ka Lok Leo

No.	Pos.	Nation	Player
18	DF	HKG	Wong Yim Kwan
20	MF	KOR	Baek Ji-hoon ^{FP}
21	MF	HKG	Law Chun Yan
27	DF	HKG	Chan Hin Kwong
29	DF	HKG	Yu Pui Hong
37	MF	HKG	Chan Ming Kong
44	GK	HKG	Ko Chun
77	MF	UKR	Serhiy Shapoval
83	GK	HKG	Pang Tsz Kin
88	GK	HKG	Yuen Ho Chun
92	FW	MAC	Leong Ka Hang ^{LP}

Players' positions as per club's announcement.
Remarks:
^{LP} These players are considered as local players in Hong Kong domestic football competitions.
^{FP} These players are registered as foreign players.

=== Out on loan ===
Note: Flags indicate national team as defined under FIFA eligibility rules; some limited exceptions apply. Players may hold more than one non-FIFA nationality.

No.	Pos.	Nation	Player
13	FW	HKG	Hui Ka Lok (at Hoi King until 30 June 2019)
30	MF	BRA	Zé Victor (at Hoi King until 30 June 2019)

== Transfers ==
=== Transfers in ===
Date from	Position	Nationality	Name	From	Fee	Ref.
1 July 2018	GK	(Hong Kong)	Ko Chun Wilson	HK Pegasus	Undisclosed	
1 July 2018	GK	(Hong Kong)	Pang Tsz Kin	Yuen Long	Undisclosed	
1 July 2018	GK	(Hong Kong)	Yuen Ho Chun	HK Pegasus	Undisclosed	
1 July 2018	DF	(Hong Kong)	Yu Wai Lim	Yuen Long	Undisclosed	
1 July 2018	DF	(Hong Kong)	Chan Hin Kwong	Yuen Long	Undisclosed	
1 July 2018	DF	(Hong Kong)	Fong Pak Lun	HK Pegasus	Undisclosed	
1 July 2018	DF	(Hong Kong)	Wong Yim Kwan	Yuen Long	Undisclosed	
1 July 2018	MF	(Hong Kong)	Tam Lok Hin	Yuen Long	Undisclosed	
1 July 2018	MF	(South Korea)	Baek Ji-hoon	Free Agent	Free Transfer	
1 July 2018	FW	(Hong Kong)	Cheng Siu Kwan	Biu Chun Rangers	Undisclosed	
6 July 2018	FW	(Brazil)	Alexandre Talento	Free Agent	Free Transfer	
9 July 2018	DF	(Spain)	Fran González	(Poland) Bytovia Bytów	Free Transfer	
13 July 2018	FW	(Macau)	Leong Ka Hang	HK Pegasus	Undisclosed	
13 July 2018	DF	(Netherlands)	Crescendo van Berkel	(Norway) Sandefjord Fotball	Free Transfer	
4 January 2019	MF	(Ukraine)	Serhiy Shapoval	Free Agent	Free Transfer	
5 January 2019	FW	(France)	Michaël N'dri	Free Agent	Free Transfer	
9 March 2019	DF	(Chinese Taipei)	Chen Ting-yang	(Chinese Taipei) Taipower	Undisclosed	

=== Transfers out ===
Date from	Position	Nationality	Name	To	Fee	Ref.
1 July 2018	GK	(Hong Kong)	Felix Luk	Hoi King	Released	
1 July 2018	GK	(Hong Kong)	Yip Ka Yu	Best Union Yuen Long	Released	
1 July 2018	GK	(Hong Kong)	Wong Tsz Chung	Kitchee SC	Released	
1 July 2018	DF	(Hong Kong)	Tse Fu Man	Unattached	Released	
1 July 2018	DF	(Hong Kong)	Fok Pak Hin Felix	Unattached	Released	
1 July 2018	DF	(Hong Kong)	Marco Wegener	Hoi King	Released	
1 July 2018	DF	(Hong Kong)	Chiu Chun Kit	Unattached	Released	
1 July 2018	DF	(Hong Kong)	Tse Long Hin	Eastern Long Lions	(end of loan)	
1 July 2018	DF	(Brazil)	Luciano Silva	Unattached	Released	
1 July 2018	DF	(North Korea)	Son Min-chol	Unattached	Released	
1 July 2018	FW	(Brazil)	Denis Lima	(Finland) FF Jaro	Released	
1 July 2018	MF	(Hong Kong)	Daniel Man	Unattached	Released	
1 July 2018	MF	(Hong Kong)	Cheng Tsz Sum	Tai Po FC	Released	
1 July 2018	MF	(Canada)	Matt Lam	Kitchee SC	(end of loan)	
1 July 2018	MF	(Hong Kong)	Lee Kai Chi	Hoi King	Released	
1 July 2018	MF	(Hong Kong)	Emmet Wan	Kitchee SC	(end of loan)	
November 2018	FW	(Brazil)	Alexandre Talento	Unattached	Released	
9 March 2019	DF	(Netherlands)	Crescendo van Berkel	Unattached	Released	

=== Loans in ===
Start Date	End Date	Position	Nationality	No	Name	From Club	Fee	Ref.
July 2018	End of Season	MF	(Hong Kong)	15	Wong Chun Hin	Eastern	Undisclosed	

=== Loans Out ===
Start Date	End Date	Position	Nationality	No	Name	To Club	Fee	Ref.
20 December 2018	End of season	FW	(Hong Kong)	13	Hui Ka Lok	Hoi King	Undisclosed	
5 January 2019	End of season	MF	(Brazil)	30	Zé Victor	Hoi King	Undisclosed	

== Club officials ==
- Owner: Lee & Man Chemical Company Limited
- Chairperson: (Hong Kong) Norman Lee
- Vice Chairperson: Kwok Ching Yee
- Director: Lam Chak Yu
- Head Coach: (Hong Kong) Chan Hiu Ming
- Assistant coach: (Hong Kong) Tsang Chiu Tat
- Technical Director: (Hong Kong) Chan Hung Ping
- Academy Director: (Hong Kong) Law Kwok Ho
- First-team goalkeeping coach: (Hong Kong) Tong Ka Ming
- Fitness coach: (Macau) Choi Chan In
- Performance analysts: (Hong Kong) Law Chun Man, Yeung Lok Man

== Friendlies ==
=== Pre-season ===
Win Draw Loss

4 August 2018 Friendly	Eastern Long Lions	4–1	Lee Man	Tuen Mun
10:00 (UTC+8)	Lee Hong Lim; Manuel Bleda; Yue Tsz Nam; Diego Eli	Report	Hui Ka Lok	Stadium: Wu Shan Recreation Playground

9 August 2018 Friendly	Lee Man	1–1	HK Pegasus	Tseung Kwan O
14:30 (UTC+8)	Stefan 27'	Report	Juninho	Stadium: Po Tsui Park

17 August 2018 Friendly	Lee Man	3–0	Resources Capital
(UTC+8)	Stefan; Leong Ka Hang	Report

== Matches ==
=== Table ===
Pos	Team	Pld	W	D	L	GF	GA	GD	Pts	Qualification or relegation
6	Pegasus	18	6	4	8	34	33	+1	22	
7	Yuen Long	18	4	6	8	36	37	−1	18	
8	Dreams FC (R)	18	4	4	10	29	53	−24	16	Relegation to Hong Kong First Division League (Note: Dreams FC announced on 11 July 2019 that they would self-relegate due to lack of funds.)
9	Lee Man	18	2	5	11	12	36	−24	11	
10	Hoi King (R)	18	2	2	14	13	58	−45	8	Relegation to Hong Kong First Division League

Source: Hong Kong Football Association
Rules for classification: 1) Points; 2) Head-to-head points; 3) Head-to-head goal difference; 4) Head-to-head goals scored; 5) Goal difference; 6) Goals scored; 7) Fair-play points; 8) Drawing lots (Play-off if the winner has to be decided).
(R) Relegated

=== Hong Kong Premier League ===
On 27 July 2018, the fixtures for the forthcoming season were announced, with the home match against Kitchee being the first match in the league of the season.

Win Draw Loss

==== Results by round ====
Round	1	2	3	4	5	6	7	8	9	10	11	12	13	14	15	16	17	18
Ground	H	H	A	A	A	H	H	A	A	A	H	A	H	A	H	H	A	H
Result	L	L	W	L	L	D	D	L	D	L	L	L	L	D	D	W	L	L
Position	9				8	8	8	8	8	8	9	9	9	9	9	9	9	9

Updated to match(es) played on 23 February 2019. Source: Competitive Matches
A = Away; H = Home; W = Win; D = Draw; L = Loss

31 August 2018 1	Lee Man	0–2	Kitchee	Tseung Kwan O
20:00 (UTC+8)	van Berkel (yellow card) 11'; Yu Wai Lim (yellow card) 15'; Wong Chun Hin (yellow card) 17'; Ngan Lok Fung (yellow card) 65'	Report	Fernando 8'; Tong Kin Man (yellow card) 45'; Nakamura 90+5'	Stadium: Tseung Kwan O Sports Ground; Attendance: 1,952; Referee: Tam Ping Wun

15 September 2018 2	Lee Man	0–2	Best Union Yuen Long	Tseung Kwan O
17:30 (UTC+8)	Tam Lok Hin (yellow card) 11' (yellow-red card) 83'; Alexandre Talento (yellow card) 63'; Ngan Lok Fung (yellow card) 72'	Report	Moser 20'; Chan Kwong Ho 50'; Kessi (yellow card) 77'	Stadium: Tseung Kwan O Sports Ground; Attendance: 530; Referee: Luk Kin Sun

30 September 2018 3	Hoi King	0–1	Lee Man	Sham Shui Po
14:30 (UTC+8)	Wong Yiu Fu (yellow card) 24'; Ho Chun Ting (yellow card) 57'; Seo Sang-min (yellow card) 63'; Felix Luk (yellow card) 90+6'	Report	Stefan 29'	Stadium: Sham Shui Po Sports Ground; Attendance: 804; Referee: Lau Fong Hei

5 October 2018 4	HK Pegasus	4–0	Lee Man	Mong Kok
20:00 (UTC+8)	Travis Major 9'; Rosen Kolev (yellow card) 28'; Juninho 47'; Liu Pui Fung 49'; Cheung Kwok Ming 79' van Berkel 82' (og.)	Report	van Berkel (yellow card) 12'; Wong Chun Hin (yellow card) 61'; Wong Yim Kwan (yellow card) 77'	Stadium: Mong Kok Stadium; Attendance: 851; Referee: Luk Kin Sun

20 October 2018 5	R&F	2–1	Lee Man	Guangzhou
14:30 (UTC+8)	Lo Kwan Yee (yellow card) 21'; Novaković 40' (yellow card) 43'; Bai He 49'; Lin Junsheng (yellow card) 85'; Paulinho (yellow card) 89'; Roberto (red card) 90+4'	Report	Yu Wai Lim (yellow card) 19'; Leong Ka Hang 49'	Stadium: Yanzigang Stadium; Attendance: 740; Referee: Ho Wai Sing

3 November 2018 6	Lee Man	2–2	Dreams FC	Tseung Kwan O
14:30 (UTC+8)	Alexandre Talento (yellow card) 26'; Baek Ji Hoon (yellow card) 30'; Leong Ka Hang 37', 58'; Yu Pui Hong (yellow card) 72'; Yu Wai Lim (yellow card) 90+4'	Report	Leung Kwok Wai (yellow card) 12'; Gondra 56'; Yoon Dong-hun 85'	Stadium: Tseung Kwan O Sports Ground; Attendance: 525; Referee: Lau Fong Hei

1 December 2018 7	Lee Man	1–1	Kwoon Chung Southern	Tseung Kwan O
14:30 (UTC+8)	Fran Gonzalez 8'; Ngan Lok Fung (yellow card) 73'; Baek Ji-hoon (yellow card) 90+2'	Report	Rehman (yellow card) 17'; Ha 54'; Dhiego Martins (yellow card) 89'	Stadium: Tseung Kwan O Sports Ground; Attendance: 595; Referee: Lau Fong Hei

8 December 2018 8	Tai Po	2–1	Lee Man	Tai Po
14:30 (UTC+8)	Chan Siu Kwan 6', 34'; David Lazari (yellow card) 87'	Report	Baek Ji-hoon 50' (yellow card) 64'; Fran Gonzalez (yellow card) 76'; Yu Wai Lim (yellow card) 90+1'	Stadium: Tai Po Sports Ground; Attendance: 653; Referee: Tam Ping Wun

15 January 2019 9	Eastern Long Lions	0–0	Lee Man	So Kon Po
20:00 (UTC+8)	Lima Pereira (yellow card) 27'; Wong Tsz Ho (red card) 64'	Report	Wong Chun Hin (yellow card) 21'; Yu Pui Hong (yellow card) 68'; Fong Pak Lun (yellow card) 90+4'; Chan Ming Kong (yellow card) 90+4'	Stadium: Hong Kong Stadium; Attendance: 811; Referee: Lau Fong Hei

20 January 2019 10	Kitchee	3–0	Lee Man	Mong Kok
17:30 (UTC+8)	Hélio (yellow card) 16'; Jared Lum 42'; Ju Yingzhi (yellow card) 69'; Lucas 79' (yellow card) 81'; Fernando 87' (yellow card) 88'	Report	Ngan Lok Fung (yellow card) 47' (yellow-red card) 76'	Stadium: Mong Kok Stadium; Attendance: 1591; Referee: Yu Kin Fung

16 February 2019 11	Lee Man	1–3	R&F	Tseung Kwan O
17:30 (UTC+8)	Cheng Siu Kwan 88'	Report	Novaković 6'; Leonço 45+2' (yellow card) 88'; Déblé 81'	Stadium: Tseung Kwan O Sports Ground; Attendance: 462; Referee: Luk Kin Sun

23 February 2019 12	Kwoon Chung Southern	3–1	Lee Man	Aberdeen
14:30 (UTC+8)	Krasić 10'; Ticão (yellow card) 24'; Lau Hok Ming 44'; Wellingsson 72'; Rehman (yellow card) 82'	Report	Yu Wai Lim (yellow card) 57'; Cheng Siu Kwan (yellow card) 63'; Fong Pak Lun (yellow card) 78' (goal) 90+5'	Stadium: Aberdeen Sports Ground; Attendance: 358; Referee: Tam Ping Wun

9 March 2019 13	Lee Man	0–2	Tai Po	Tseung Kwan O
20:00 (UTC+8)	Fong Pak Lun (yellow card) 32'; Baek Ji-hoon (yellow card) 40' (yellow-red card) 45+1'; Yu Wai Lim (yellow card) 90+3'	Report	Chan Siu Kwan 33' (yellow card) 40'; Wong Wai (yellow card) 53'; Sartori 66'	Stadium: Tseung Kwan O Sports Ground; Attendance: 312; Referee: Luk Kin Sun

17 March 2019 14	Best Union Yuen Long	2–2	Lee Man	Yuen Long
17:30 (UTC+8)	Moser 20' (yellow card) 82'; Cleiton (yellow card) HT; Ekwegwo 80'; Kessi (yellow card) 87'; Wang Ruei (yellow card) 89'; Tomas (yellow card) AM'	Report	N'dri 3'; Yu Wai Lim (red card) 5'; Fran González (yellow card) 87'; Stefan 89'	Stadium: Yuen Long Stadium; Attendance: 713; Referee: Ho Wai Sang

5 April 2019 15	Lee Man	0–0	Eastern Long Lions	Tseung Kwan O
17:30 (UTC+8)	Cheng Siu Kwan (yellow card) 56'; N'dri (yellow card) 65'	Report	Diego Eli (yellow card) 43'; Manuel Bleda Rodríguez (yellow card) 64'; Tsang Kam To (yellow card) 65'	Stadium: Tseung Kwan O Sports Ground; Attendance: 630; Referee: Yu Kin Fung

20 April 2019 16	Lee Man	2–1	Hong Kong Pegasus	Tseung Kwan O
14:30 (UTC+8)	N'dri (yellow card) 26'; Shapoval 36'; Yuen Chun Sing 56' (o.g.); Stefan (yellow card) 76'; Yu Pui Hong (yellow card) 90+4'	Report	Yuen Chun Sing 8' (yellow card) 58'; Lazari (yellow card) 67'; Chan Siu Ki (yellow card) 84'; Wu Chun Ming (yellow card) 84'	Stadium: Tseung Kwan O Sports Ground; Attendance: 368; Referee: Ho Wai Sing

5 May 2019 17	Dreams FC	6–0	Lee Man	Tsing Yi
17:30 (UTC+8)	Gondra 24', 81'; Jordan Lam 35'; Chen Ting-yang 62' (o.g.); Martínez 76'; Higino 83'	Report	Stefan (yellow card) 23'; Fran González (yellow card) 28'; Yu Pui Hong (yellow card) 39'	Stadium: Tsing Yi Sports Ground; Attendance: 364; Referee: Wong Wai Lun

19 May 2019 18	Lee Man	0–1	Hoi King	Tseung Kwan O
14:30 (UTC+8)	Wong Yim Kwan (yellow card) 36' (yellow-red card) 90+1'; Fran González (yellow card) 59'; N'dri (yellow card) 77'	Report	Ho Chun Ting (yellow card) 45'; Lew Wai Yip 54'; Lau Wing Sang (yellow card) 71'; Au Man Lok (yellow card) 90'	Stadium: Tseung Kwan O Sports Ground; Attendance: 264; Referee: Wong Kei Hoi

=== Hong Kong Senior Challenge Shield ===
27 October 2018 Quarter-finals	Eastern	2–1	Lee Man	Mong Kok
14:30 (UTC+8)	Bleda 35'; Everton 90'	Report	Alexandre Talento (yellow card) 45'; Baek Ji-hoon 45+4' (yellow card) 90+2'; Fran González (yellow card) 61'; Yu Pui Hong (yellow card) 72'	Stadium: Mong Kok Stadium; Attendance: 1,227; Referee: Ng Chiu Kok

=== Hong Kong Sapling Cup ===
1 January 2019	Pegasus	0–2	Lee Man	Mong Kok
14:30 UTC+8		Report	Stefan 28' (pen.); Leong Ka Hang 47'; Yu Wai Lim (yellow card) 59'; Chan Hin Kwong (yellow card) 70'	Stadium: Mongkok Stadium; Attendance: 666; Referee: Tang Hing Fu

3 February 2019	Lee Man	2–3	Kwoon Chung Southern	Tseung Kwan O
17:30 UTC+8	Stefan 27'; Baek Ji-hoon 82'; Chan Ming Kong (yellow card) 83'	Report	Hui Wang Fung (yellow card) 33'; Emmet Wan 19'; Sham Kwok Fai (yellow card) 45+1'; Rehman (yellow card) 51'; Wellingsson (yellow card) 60'; Lau Hok Ming (yellow card) 84'; James Ha 67'; Krasić (yellow card) 90+2' (goal) 90+2'	Stadium: Tseung Kwan O Sports Ground; Attendance: 429; Referee: Liu Kwok Man

10 February 2019	Hoi King	2–6	Lee Man	Diamond Hill
14:30 UTC+8	Buddle (yellow card) 5'; Chan Man Chun (yellow card) 59'; Kim Min Ki 45+2', 64'; Kim Jin-seo (yellow card) 67'; Wong Tsz Chun (yellow card) 79'	Report	Cheng Siu Kwan 7'; Fran González 16', 38', 74' (pen.) (yellow card) 39'; N'dri 23' (pen.); Tsang Tsz Hin 40' (o.g.); Baek Ji-hoon (yellow card) 50'; Yu Wai Lim (yellow card) 54'	Stadium: Hammer Hill Road Sports Ground; Attendance: 327; Referee: Wong Wai Lun

3 March 2019	Lee Man	3–2	Kitchee	Tseung Kwan O
17:30 UTC+8	Leong Ka Hang 49', 69'; Baek Ji-hoon (yellow card) 56'; N'dri (yellow card) 68'; Fran González (yellow card) 82' (goal) 90+1'	Report	Smith (yellow card) 45+1'; Tadic 60'; Dani Cancela (yellow card) 64'; Fernando 83'	Stadium: Tseung Kwan O Sports Ground; Attendance: 711; Referee: Ng Chiu Kok

14 April 2019 Semi-finals	Lee Man	4–1	Dreams FC	Mongkok
16:00 UTC+8	Stefan 28'; Cheng Siu Kwan 42'; Yu Pui Hong 81'; Fran González 90+1' (pen.)	Report	Lam Hin Ting (yellow card) 55', (goal) 90+2'; Tse Man Wing (yellow card) 58'; Acosta (yellow card) 84'	Stadium: Mong Kok Stadium; Attendance: 1,019; Referee: Ng Chiu Kok

27 April 2019 Finals	Best Union Yuen Long	2–3	Lee Man	Mongkok
16:00 UTC+8	Tse Wai Chun (yellow card) 56'; Lee Oi Hin 76'; Law Chun Ting 89'; Kessi (red card) 115'	Report	Shapoval 61'; Wong Yim Kwan 75'; Ngan Lok Fung (yellow card) 78'; Chan Ming Kong (yellow card) 112'; Yu Wai Lim (yellow card) 119' (yellow-red card) 120'; Fran González 117'	Stadium: Mong Kok Stadium; Attendance: 2,685; Referee: Ho Wai Sing

=== Hong Kong FA Cup ===
30 March 2019 Quarter-finals	Kitchee	6–0	Lee Man	Mong Kok
17:30 (UTC+8)	Vadocz 39' (pen.); Li Ngai Hoi 45+2'; Matt Lam 68', 74'; Jordi 77'; Fernando 89'	Report	Fong Pak Lun (yellow card) 45+2'; Leong Ka Hang (yellow card) 65'; Wong Chun Hin (yellow card) 79'	Stadium: Mongkok Stadium; Attendance: 1,092; Referee: Ho Wai Sing

== Squad statistics ==
=== Appearances ===
Players with no appearances not included in the list.
As of match played 19 May 2019

Sortable table
No.	Pos.	Nat.	Name	Premier League		FA Cup		Senior Shield		Sapling Cup		Total	
No.	Pos.	Nat.	Name	Apps	Starts	Apps	Starts	Apps	Starts	Apps	Starts	Apps	Starts
3	DF	(Chinese Taipei)	Chen Ting-yang	1	1	1	1	0	0	0	0	2	2
5	DF	(Spain)	Fran González	18	17	0	0	1	1	6	6	25	24
6	DF	(Hong Kong)	Yu Wai Lim	15	15	0	0	1	1	6	6	22	22
7	FW	(Brazil)	Stefan	15	9	1	1	0	0	4	4	19	15
8	MF	(Hong Kong)	Tam Lok Hin	13	6	1	1	1	1	2	1	17	9
10	FW	(France)	Michaël N'dri	9	9	1	1	0	0	5	4	15	14
11	MF	(Hong Kong)	Cheng Siu Kwan	15	8	0	0	1	0	6	6	22	14
12	MF	(Hong Kong)	Lai Yiu Cheong	6	3	0	0	0	0	1	0	7	3
14	DF	(Hong Kong)	Fong Pak Lun	15	10	1	1	0	0	5	3	21	13
15	MF	(Hong Kong)	Wong Chun Hin	13	8	1	0	0	0	2	2	16	10
16	MF	(Hong Kong)	Ngan Lok Fung	17	16	1	1	1	1	5	3	24	21
17	MF	(Hong Kong)	Chow Ka Lok Leo	0	0	0	0	0	0	2	0	2	0
18	DF	(Hong Kong)	Wong Yim Kwan	6	5	1	1	1	1	4	3	12	9
20	MF	(South Korea)	Baek Ji Hoon	14	10	1	0	1	1	4	3	20	14
21	MF	(Hong Kong)	Law Chun Yan	3	3	1	1	0	0	1	0	5	4
27	DF	(Hong Kong)	Chan Hin Kwong	7	7	0	0	0	0	3	3	10	10
29	DF	(Hong Kong)	Yu Pui Hong	14	13	0	0	1	1	4	3	19	17
37	MF	(Hong Kong)	Chan Ming Kong	7	4	1	1	0	0	4	2	12	7
44	GK	(Hong Kong)	Ko Chun Wilson	1	1	0	0	0	0	0	0	1	1
77	MF	(Ukraine)	Serhiy Shapoval	10	9	1	1	0	0	5	5	16	15
83	GK	(Hong Kong)	Pang Tsz Kin	8	7	1	1	0	0	2	2	11	10
88	GK	(Hong Kong)	Yuen Ho Chun	10	10	0	0	1	1	4	4	15	15
92	FW	(Macau)	Leong Ka Hang	12	9	1	0	1	1	4	4	18	14
Players who are on loan/left Lee Man that have appeared this season
9	DF	(Netherlands)	Crescendo van Berkel	8	8	0	0	1	1	2	0	11	9
10	FW	(Brazil)	Alexandre Talento	4	4	0	0	1	1	0	0	5	5
13	FW	(Hong Kong)	Hui Ka Lok	1	0	0	0	1	0	0	0	2	0
30	MF	(Brazil)	Zé Victor	3	2	0	0	0	0	1	1	4	3

=== Goalscorers ===
Includes all competitive matches.

As of match played 19 May 2019

Rank	Pos.	No.	Player	Premier League	FA Cup	Senior Shield	Sapling Cup	Total
1	DF	5	(Spain) Fran Golzález	1	0	0	6	7
2	FW	92	(Macau) Leong Ka Hang	3	0	0	3	6
3	FW	7	(Brazil) Stefan	2	0	0	3	5
4	FW	11	(Hong Kong) Cheng Siu Kwan	1	0	0	2	3
4	MF	20	(South Korea) Baek Ji-hoon	1	0	1	1	3
5	FW	10	(France) Michaël N'dri	1	0	0	1	2
5	MF	77	(Ukraine) Serhiy Shapoval	1	0	0	1	2
5	Own Goals			1	0	0	1	2
6	DF	14	(Hong Kong) Fong Pak Lun	1	0	0	0	1
6	DF	18	(Hong Kong) Wong Yim Kwan	0	0	0	1	1
6	DF	29	(Hong Kong) Yu Pui Hong	0	0	0	1	1
Total				12	0	1	20	33

=== Clean sheets ===
As of match played 19 May 2019

No.	Player	Premier League	FA Cup	Senior Shield	Sapling Cup	Total
83	(Hong Kong) Pang Tsz Kin	3	0	0	0	3
88	(Hong Kong) Yuen Ho Chun	0	0	0	1	1
Total		3	0	0	1	4

=== Disciplinary record ===
As of match played 19 May 2019

No.	Pos.	Name	Premier League		FA Cup		Senior Shield		Sapling Cup		Total	
No.	Pos.	Name	Booked	Sent off (straight red)	Booked	Sent off (straight red)	Booked	Sent off (straight red)	Booked	Sent off (straight red)	Booked	Sent off (straight red)
5	DF	(Spain) Fran González	4	0	0	0	1	0	2	0	7	0
6	DF	(Hong Kong) Yu Wai Lim	6	1	0	0	0	0	4	1	10	2
7	FW	(Brazil) Stefan	2	0	0	0	0	0	0	0	2	0
8	MF	(Hong Kong) Tam Lok Hin	2	1	0	0	0	0	0	0	2	1
9	DF	(Netherlands) Crescendo van Berkel	2	0	0	0	0	0	0	0	2	0
10	FW	(France) Michaël N'dri	3	0	0	0	0	0	1	0	4	0
10	FW	(Brazil) Alexandre Talento	2	0	0	0	1	0	0	0	3	0
11	FW	(Hong Kong) Cheng Siu Kwan	2	0	0	0	0	0	0	0	2	0
14	DF	(Hong Kong) Fong Pak Lun	2	0	1	0	0	0	0	0	3	0
15	FM	(Hong Kong) Wong Chun Hin	3	0	1	0	0	0	0	0	4	0
16	MF	(Hong Kong) Ngan Lok Fung	5	1	0	0	0	0	1	0	6	1
18	DF	(Hong Kong) Wong Yim Kwan	3	1	0	0	0	0	0	0	3	1
20	MF	(South Korea) Baek Ji-hoon	5	1	0	0	1	0	2	0	8	1
27	DF	(Hong Kong) Chan Hin Kwong	0	0	0	0	0	0	1	0	1	0
29	DF	(Hong Kong) Yu Pui Hong	5	0	0	0	1	0	0	0	6	0
37	MF	(Hong Kong) Chan Ming Kong	1	0	0	0	0	0	2	0	3	0
92	FW	(Macau) Leong Ka Hang	0	0	1	0	0	0	0	0	1	0
Total			47	5	3	0	4	0	13	1	67	6
