= 2022–23 Hong Kong Sapling Cup =

Football tournament season

2022–23 JC Sapling Cup
Tournament details
- Country: Hong Kong
- Dates: 2 September 2022 – 20 May 2023
- Teams: 10

Final positions
- Champions: Southern
- Runners-up: Lee Man

Tournament statistics
- Matches played: 43
- Goals scored: 151 (3.51 per match)
- Attendance: 25,506 (593 per match)
- Top goal scorer(s): Paulinho Simionato (8 goals)

Awards
- Best player: Stefan Pereira

The 2022–23 Sapling Cup (named as JC Sapling Cup for sponsorship reasons) was the 8th edition of the Sapling Cup. The competition was contested by the 10 teams in the 2022–23 Hong Kong Premier League. Each team was required to field a minimum of three players born on or after 1 January 2001 (U-22) and a maximum of six foreign players during every whole match, with no more than five foreign players on the pitch at the same time.

Eastern were the defending champions, but were eliminated in the semi-finals. Southern became the champions for the first time after beating Lee Man in the final.

The champions of the Jockey Club Sapling Cup received HKD$120,000 in prize money, and HKD$100,000 donation to the champions' specified organization. Meanwhile, the runner-up received HKD$60,000, and HKD$50,000 donation to the runner-up's specified organization. In addition, the two losing teams in the semi-finals received HK$30,000 while the remaining teams will receive HK$15,000.

In addition, the best U-22 player in each team received a prize of HKD$3,000. The most outstanding U-22 player among the selected best U-22 players from each team received an additional HKD$5,000 for being the best of all the U-22 players.

== Format ==
The participating teams were divided into two groups for a double round-robin tournament. Top two teams in each group advance to the semi-finals.

== Calendar ==
Phase	Draw Date	Date	Matches	Clubs
Group stage	20 August 2022	2 September 2022 – 10 April 2023	40	10 → 4
Semi-finals	20 August 2022	19–20 April 2023	2	4 → 2
Final	20 August 2022	20 May 2023 at Mong Kok Stadium	1	2 → 1

== Fixtures and results ==
=== Group stage ===
==== Group A ====
Pos	Team	Pld	W	D	L	GF	GA	GD	Pts	Qualification
1	Southern	8	6	1	1	25	8	+17	19	Advance to Semi-finals
2	Lee Man	8	5	2	1	18	10	+8	17	Advance to Semi-finals
3	Tai Po	8	3	0	5	14	14	0	9	
4	HKFC	8	2	1	5	14	18	−4	7	
5	Sham Shui Po	8	1	2	5	6	27	−21	5	

Source: Hong Kong Football Association
Rules for classification: 1) Points; 2) Head-to-head points; 3) Head-to-head goal difference; 4) Goal difference; 5) Goals scored.

10 September 2022 SP02	Southern	4–0	Sham Shui Po	Tai Po, New Territories
15:00	Kessi 27'; Sasaki 64' (pen.), 76', 77'	Report		Stadium: Tai Po Sports Ground; Attendance: 463; Referee: Luk Kin Sun

17 September 2022 SP03	Tai Po	0–1	Southern	Mong Kok, Kowloon
15:00		Report	Dudu 90'	Stadium: Mong Kok Stadium; Attendance: 942; Referee: Ho Wai Sing

1 October 2022 SP04	Sham Shui Po	1–5	Tai Po	Tai Po, New Territories
15:00	Chen Hao 66'	Report	Khan 8'; Chan Hiu Fung 45'; Paulinho 67', 83', 87' (pen.)	Stadium: Tai Po Sports Ground; Attendance: 674; Referee: Lau Fong Hei

8 October 2022 SP05	HKFC	1–1	Sham Shui Po	Aberdeen, Hong Kong
15:00	Ngue 68'	Report	Lo Kong Wai 74'	Stadium: Aberdeen Sports Ground; Attendance: 149; Referee: Wong Po Sing

9 October 2022 SP07	Lee Man	1–0	Tai Po	Tai Po, New Territories
15:00	Gil 44'	Report		Stadium: Tai Po Sports Ground; Attendance: 611; Referee: Ho Wai Sing

5 November 2022 SP11	Southern	4–1	Lee Man	Mong Kok, Kowloon
18:00	Chen Ngo Hin 8', 33'; Yu Wai Lim 23' (o.g.); Tse Long Hin 71'	Report	Diego 57'	Stadium: Mong Kok Stadium; Attendance: 855

6 November 2022 SP12	Tai Po	2–4	HKFC	Mong Kok, Kowloon
18:00	Chung Wai Keung 7'; Lee Ka Ho 32'	Report	Maciel 8'; Moore 87'; Paulinho 90+2', 90+5'	Stadium: Mong Kok Stadium; Attendance: 347; Referee: Liu Kwok Man

9 November 2022 SP13	HKFC	2–3	Southern	Mong Kok, Kowloon
20:00	McMillan 29'; Leo 86'	Report	Pereira 21', 57'; Dudu 90+6'	Stadium: Mong Kok Stadium; Attendance: 373; Referee: Woo Chun Sing

3 December 2022 SP16	HKFC	1–2	Lee Man	Tsing Yi, New Territories
15:00	Léo 63' (pen.)	Report	Cheng Chun Wang 41'; Gil 53'	Stadium: Tsing Yi Sports Ground; Attendance: 290; Referee: Tam Ping Wun

18 December 2022 SP18	Sham Shui Po	0–5	Lee Man	Sham Shui Po, Kowloon
15:00		Report	Everton 19', 39', 49'; Bleda 70', 73'	Stadium: Sham Shui Po Sports Ground; Attendance: 416; Referee: Wu Chun Sing

31 December 2022 SP20	Sham Shui Po	1–5	HKFC	Tai Po, New Territories
15:00	Thiago 31'	Report	Paulinho 15', 58'; Dujardin 37'; Maciel 64'; Bailey 76'	Stadium: Tai Po Sports Ground; Attendance: 202; Referee: Poon Chun Kit

1 January 2023 SP21	Tai Po	2–4	Lee Man	Tai Po, New Territories
15:00	Paulinho 67', 79' (pen.)	Report	Nakamura 3'; Bleda 9'; Tachibana 11'; Everton 62'	Stadium: Tai Po Sports Ground; Attendance: 525; Referee: Tam Ping Wun

7 January 2023 SP24	Southern	0–1	Tai Po	Aberdeen, Hong Kong
15:00		Report	Paulinho 73' (pen.)	Stadium: Aberdeen Sports Ground; Attendance: 273; Referee: Liu Kwok Man

8 January 2023 SP25	Lee Man	0–0	Sham Shui Po	Diamond Hill, Kowloon
15:00		Report		Stadium: Hammer Hill Road Sports Ground; Attendance: 308; Referee: Law Bik Chi

5 March 2023 SP31	Sham Shui Po	0–5	Southern	Tai Po, New Territories
15:00		Report	Tomas 62'; Pereira 66'; Moser 79', 82'; Khan 90+1'	Stadium: Tai Po Sports Ground; Attendance: 232; Referee: Law Bik Chi

5 March 2023 SP32	Lee Man	2–0	HKFC	Tseung Kwan O, New Territories
18:00	Gavilán 8'; Gil 80'	Report		Stadium: Tseung Kwan O Sports Ground; Attendance: 288; Referee: Poon Chun Kit

1 April 2023 SP34	Southern	5–1	HKFC	Mong Kok, Kowloon
15:00	Awal 14'; Moser 19', 23', 39'; Pereira 90+4' (pen.)	Report	Wong Sheung Choi 85'	Stadium: Mong Kok Stadium; Attendance: 520; Referee: Cheung Wai Lung

2 April 2023 SP35	Tai Po	2–3	Sham Shui Po	Tai Po, New Territories
15:00	Paulinho 63'; Wong Tsz Chun 80'	Report	Chen Hao 49'; Benavides 57'; Lo Kong Wai 65'	Stadium: Tai Po Sports Ground; Attendance: 452; Referee: Chow Hon Fai

8 April 2023 SP38	HKFC	0–2	Tai Po	Tai Po, New Territories
15:00		Report	Paulinho 48'; Wong Tsz Chun 90+1'	Stadium: Tai Po Sports Ground; Attendance: 325; Referee: Wong Po Sing

9 April 2023 SP39	Lee Man	3–3	Southern	Tseung Kwan O, New Territories
15:00	Gavilán 3'; Everton 42'; Gil 90+2'	Report	Awal 21', 75'; Moser 39'	Stadium: Tseung Kwan O Sports Ground; Attendance: 577; Referee: Luk Kin Sun

==== Group B ====
Pos	Team	Pld	W	D	L	GF	GA	GD	Pts	Qualification
1	Eastern	8	5	2	1	16	8	+8	17 (Note: Head-to-head points: Eastern 4, Rangers 1)	Advance to Semi-finals
2	Rangers	8	5	2	1	14	9	+5	17	Advance to Semi-finals
3	Kitchee	8	5	1	2	24	7	+17	16	
4	HK U23	8	1	1	6	4	14	−10	4	
5	Resources Capital	8	0	2	6	9	29	−20	2	

Source: Hong Kong Football Association
Rules for classification: 1) Points; 2) Head-to-head points; 3) Head-to-head goal difference; 4) Goal difference; 5) Goals scored.
Notes:

2 September 2022 SP01	Rangers	2–0	HK U23	Mong Kok, Kowloon
20:00	Bala 17'; Lau Chi Lok 85'	Report		Stadium: Mong Kok Stadium; Attendance: 711; Referee: Woo Chun Sing

8 October 2022 SP06	Resources Capital	3–3	Rangers	Tai Po, New Territories
15:00	Sá 34'; Ortega 86'; Lam 90+1'	Report	Yu Joy Yin 2'; Lau Chi Lok 23', 45'	Stadium: Tai Po Sports Ground; Attendance: 368; Referee: Wong Wai Lun

9 October 2022 SP08	Kitchee	5–1	Eastern	Mong Kok, Kowloon
18:00	Mikael 9', 70'; Damjanović 28', 65' (pen.); Manias 90+1'	Report	Bertomeu 7'	Stadium: Mong Kok Stadium; Attendance: Luk Kin Sun; Referee: 1,591

19 October 2022 SP09	Eastern	1–0	HK U23	Mong Kok, Kowloon
20:00	Sun Ming Him 33'	Report		Stadium: Mong Kok Stadium; Attendance: 378; Referee: Cheung Wai Lung

5 November 2022 SP10	Eastern	3–1	Resources Capital	Tsing Yi, New Territories
15:00	Sun Ming Him 6'; Ma Hei Wai 35'; Chu Wai Kwan 54'	Report	Lam 88'	Stadium: Tsing Yi Sports Ground; Attendance: 337; Referee: Luk Kin Sun

16 November 2022 SP14	Kitchee	2–0	HK U23	Mong Kok, Kowloon
20:00	Sagynbayev 8'; Ngan Cheuk Pan 90+3'	Report		Stadium: Mong Kok Stadium; Attendance: 478; Referee: Yu Kin Fung

30 November 2022 SP15	HK U23	1–0	Resources Capital	Mong Kok, Kowloon
20:00	Tang In Chim 90+2'	Report		Stadium: Mong Kok Stadium; Attendance: 226; Referee: Chow Hon Fai

10 December 2022 SP17	Rangers	0–0	Eastern	Aberdeen, Hong Kong
15:00		Report		Stadium: Aberdeen Sports Ground; Attendance: 217; Referee: Ho Wai Sing

18 December 2022 SP19	Resources Capital	1–6	Kitchee	Tsing Yi, New Territories
18:00	Lam 66'	Report	Scott 8'; Ngan Cheuk Pan 39'; Tsang Yi Hang 59'; Manias 64'; Ichikawa 78'; Mikael 90+4' (pen.)	Stadium: Tsing Yi Sports Ground; Attendance: 284; Referee: Tang Hing Fu

1 January 2023 SP22	HK U23	0–1	Eastern	Mong Kok, Kowloon
18:00		Report	Wong Ho Chun 41'	Stadium: Mong Kok Stadium; Attendance: 365; Referee: Tang Hing Fu

2 January 2023 SP23	Kitchee	4–0	Resources Capital	Mong Kok, Kowloon
15:00	Gerbig 45', 87'; Yip Cheuk Man 64' (o.g.); Alex 81'	Report		Stadium: Mong Kok Stadium; Attendance: 850; Referee: Law Bik Chi

8 January 2023 SP26	Kitchee	1–2	Rangers	Mong Kok, Kowloon
18:00	Damjanović 74'	Report	Kanda 53', 64'	Stadium: Mong Kok Stadium; Attendance: 722; Referee: Woo Chun Sing

8 February 2023 SP27	HK U23	1–2	Rangers	Mong Kok, Kowloon
20:00	Wong Ho Yin 61'	Report	Juninho 55', 88'	Stadium: Mong Kok Stadium; Attendance: 303; Referee: Cheung Wai Lung

15 February 2023 SP28	Resources Capital	0–6	Eastern	Mong Kok, Kowloon
20:00		Report	Wong Ho Chun 25', 45'; Jones 64'; Gondra 66'; Bertomeu 69'; Lee Chun Ting 90+3'	Stadium: Mong Kok Stadium; Attendance: 308; Referee: Chow Hon Fai

4 March 2023 SP29	Eastern	2–0	Rangers	Tsing Yi, New Territories
15:00	Sun Ming Him 62'; Bertomeu 77'	Report		Stadium: Tsing Yi Sports Ground; Attendance: 529; Referee: Liu Kwok Man

4 March 2023 SP30	HK U23	0–4	Kitchee	Mong Kok, Kowloon
18:00		Report	Mingazov 27', 65'; Russell 43'; Sagynbayev 63'	Stadium: Mong Kok Stadium; Attendance: 212; Referee: Woo Chun Sing

15 March 2023 SP33	Rangers	1–0	Kitchee	Mong Kok, Kowloon
20:00	Ibrahim 36'	Report		Stadium: Mong Kok Stadium; Attendance: 677; Referee: Tam Ping Wun

2 April 2023 SP36	Resources Capital	2–2	HK U23	Tsing Yi, New Territories
18:00	Ki Sze Ho 54'; Ho Sze Chit 74'	Report	Korani 28'; Ho Ka Chi 62'	Stadium: Tsing Yi Sports Ground; Attendance: 231; Referee: Law Bik Chi

7 April 2023 SP37	Rangers	4–2	Resources Capital	Diamond Hill, Kowloon
15:00	Juninho 8'; Kanda 18'; Tsang Chung Nam 43' (o.g.); Kim Min-kyu 54'	Report	Sá 56' (pen.), 80'	Stadium: Hammer Hill Road Sports Ground; Attendance: 596; Referee: Liu Kwok Man

10 April 2023 SP40	Eastern	2–2	Kitchee	Mong Kok, Kowloon
15:00	Gondra 3'; Sun Ming Him 69'	Report	Mingazov 52'; Hélio 88'	Stadium: Mong Kok Stadium; Attendance: 2,222; Referee: Tam Ping Wun

=== Semi-finals ===
19 April 2023 SF	Southern	2–2 (6–5 p)	Rangers	Mong Kok, Kowloon
20:00	Sasaki 56' (pen.); Moser 76'	Report	Juninho 50'; Park Jong-bum 61'	Stadium: Mong Kok Stadium; Attendance: 985; Referee: Tam Ping Wun
	Penalties
	Pereira (penalty scored); Kessi (penalty scored); Sasaki (penalty missed); Chen Ngo Hin (penalty scored); Kawase (penalty scored); Khan (penalty missed); Lau Hok Ming (penalty scored); Buddle (penalty scored)		(penalty scored) Lo Kwan Yee; (penalty missed) Kim Min-kyu; (penalty scored) Juninho; (penalty scored) Lam Ka Wai; (penalty scored) Ibrahim; (penalty missed) Yu Joy Yin; (penalty scored) Kilama; (penalty missed) Lui Cheuk Kan

20 April 2023 SF	Eastern	0–1	Lee Man	Mong Kok, Kowloon
20:00		Report	Sesay 90'	Stadium: Mong Kok Stadium; Attendance: 1,575; Referee: Luk Kin Sun

=== Final ===
20 May 2023 F	Southern	2–0	Lee Man	Mong Kok, Kowloon
15:00 UTC+8	Pereira 55', 80'	Report		Stadium: Mong Kok Stadium; Attendance: 2,519; Referee: Ho Wai Sing

== Final ==
The final took place on 20 May 2023 at Mong Kok Stadium.

20 May 2023
15:00 UTC+8

Southern	2–0	Lee Man
Pereira 55', 80'	Report

Mong Kok Stadium
Attendance: 2,519
Referee: Ho Wai Sing

Southern	Lee Man

GK	25	(Hong Kong) Ng Wai Him (U-22)
CB	4	(Japan) Kota Kawase
CB	6	(Brazil) Kessi
CF	7	(Brazil) Stefan Pereira		(substituted off) 88'
RB	8	(Hong Kong) Lee Ka Yiu
CM	11	(Japan) Shu Sasaki (c)
CB	12	(Hong Kong) Tomas Maronesi
CF	17	(Brazil) Jean Moser		(substituted off) 81'
RW	18	(Hong Kong) Mahama Awal
CM	23	(Hong Kong) Yung Ho (U-22)	(yellow card) 32'	(substituted off) 63'
LW	28	(Hong Kong) Chen Ngo Hin (U-22)		(substituted off) 81'
Substitutes:
GK	29	(Hong Kong) Tse Tak Him
CB	5	(Brazil) Dudu
CM	14	(Hong Kong) Ho Chun Ting
LB	16	(Hong Kong) Chak Ting Fung
LW	19	(Hong Kong) Jahangir Khan
MF	21	(Hong Kong) Hardikpreet Singh (U-22)		(substituted on) 81'
CM	24	(Hong Kong) Ju Yingzhi		(substituted on) 81'
MF	26	(Hong Kong) Chan Hoi Pak
MF	27	(Hong Kong) Lo Kam Wang (U-22)	(yellow card) 90+1'	(substituted on) 63'
CB	44	(Hong Kong) Lau Hok Ming		(substituted on) 88'
RW	67	(Hong Kong) Seb Buddle
Head Coach:
(Hong Kong) Cheng Siu Chung

GK	26	(Hong Kong) Chan Ka Ho		(substituted off) 76'
RB	3	(Hong Kong) Tsui Wang Kit (c)
CB	5	(Hong Kong) Yu Wai Lim	(yellow card) 47'	(substituted off) 64'
CF	9	(Spain) Manuel Bleda	(yellow card) 53'
AM	10	(Argentina) Jonatan Acosta		(substituted off) 64'
LB	12	(Hong Kong) Law Cheuk Hei (U-22)
CB	14	(Spain) José Ángel	(yellow card) 90'
CM	18	(Hong Kong) Zachary Hui (U-22)
RW	24	(Hong Kong) Cheng Chun Wang (U-22)	(yellow card) 61'	(substituted off) 76'
DM	33	(Hong Kong) Diego Eli
LW	91	(Brazil) Gil
Substitutes:
GK	92	(Hong Kong) Tang Tsz Long (U-22)		(substituted on) 76'
LB	4	(Japan) Ryoya Tachibana
LW	7	(Hong Kong) Lee Hong Lim
RW	11	(Hong Kong) Cheng Siu Kwan		(substituted on) 64'
DM	16	(Hong Kong) Ngan Lok Fung		(substituted on) 77'
RB	21	(Hong Kong) Tsang Kam To
AM	23	(Hong Kong) Wong Wai		(substituted on) 64'
DF	29	(Hong Kong) Yu Pui Hong
DF	30	(Hong Kong) Liang Ngai Tung (U-22)
DF	37	(Hong Kong) Leung Lap Tin (U-22)
AM	44	(Hong Kong) Yuto Nakamura		(substituted on) 76'
CB	94	(Sierra Leone) Alie Sesay
Head Coach:
(Hong Kong) Tsang Chiu Tat

Player of the Match:
Stefan Pereira (Southern)

Assistant Referees:
Fok Pong Shing
Wong Ping Chung
Fourth Official:
Law Bik Chi

Match rules

- 90 minutes
- 30 minutes of extra time if necessary
- Penalty shoot-out if scores still level
- Maximum of five substitutions, with a sixth allowed in extra time

== Top scorers ==
Rank	Player	Club	Goals
1	(Brazil) Paulinho Simionato	Tai Po	8
2	(Brazil) Jean Moser	Southern	7
3	(Brazil) Stefan Pereira	Southern	6
4	(Brazil) Everton Camargo	Lee Man	5
5	(Hong Kong) Paulinho	HKFC	4
5	(Japan) Shu Sasaki	Southern	4
5	(Brazil) Gil	Lee Man	4
5	(Hong Kong) Sun Ming Him	Eastern	4
5	(Brazil) Juninho	Rangers	4
10	11 players		3

== Awards ==
=== Best U-22 Player ===
Prize	Team	Winner
Best U-22 Player in Each Team	Kitchee	(Hong Kong) Yuen Chun Him
Best U-22 Player in Each Team	Eastern	(Hong Kong) Chung Hoi Man
Best U-22 Player in Each Team	Lee Man	(Hong Kong) Law Cheuk Hei
Best U-22 Player in Each Team	Southern	(Hong Kong) Ng Wai Him
Best U-22 Player in Each Team	Rangers	(Hong Kong) Lo Siu Kei
Best U-22 Player in Each Team	Tai Po	(Hong Kong) Kwok Chun Nok
Best U-22 Player in Each Team	HKFC	(Hong Kong) Timothy Chow
Best U-22 Player in Each Team	Resources Capital	(Hong Kong) Yip Cheuk Man
Best U-22 Player in Each Team	Sham Shui Po	(Hong Kong) Tai Ting Hong
Best U-22 Player in Each Team	HK U23	(Hong Kong) Chan Yun Tung
Best of all U-22 Players	Southern	(Hong Kong) Ng Wai Him
