= Ng Wai Him =

Hong Kong footballer

Ng Wai Him 伍瑋謙
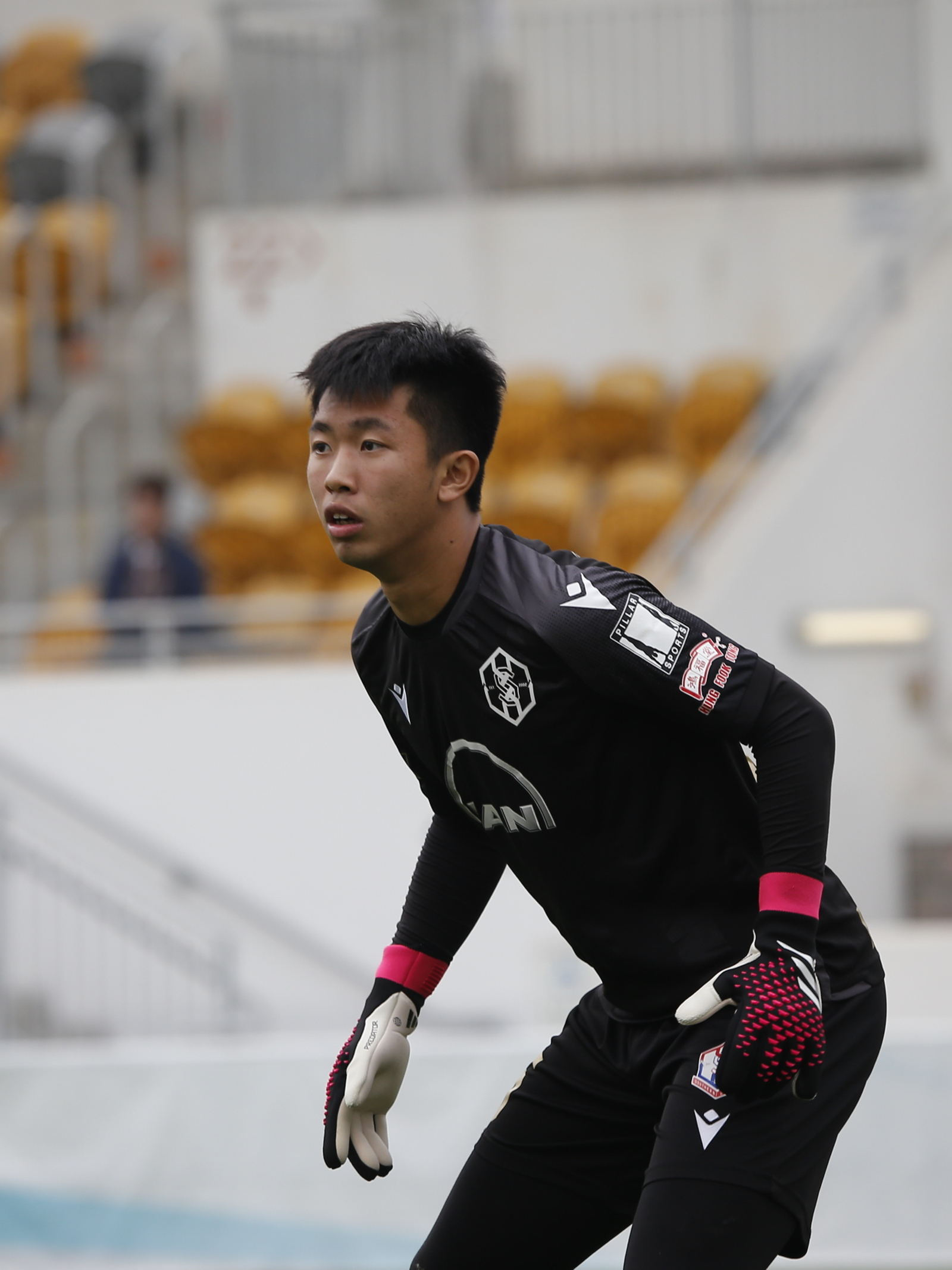

Personal information
- Full name: Ng Wai Him
- Date of birth: 30 June 2002 (age 24)
- Place of birth: Kwun Tong, Kowloon, Hong Kong
- Height: 1.83 m (6 ft 0 in)
- Position: Goalkeeper

Team information
- Current team: Southern
- Number: 1

Youth career
- –2018: CFCSSHK
- 2019–2020: Happy Valley

Senior career*
Years	Team	Apps	(Gls)
2018–2019	CFCSSHK	4	(0)
2019–2021	Happy Valley	1	(0)
2021–	Southern	86	(0)

International career^{‡}
2017–2018	Hong Kong U-16	7	(0)
2019	Hong Kong U-19	3	(0)
2023	Hong Kong U-22	5	(0)
2024	Hong Kong	1	(0)
- * Club domestic league appearances and goals as of 21 November 2026 ‡ National team caps and goals as of 5 September 2024

Ng Wai Him (Chinese: 伍瑋謙; born 30 June 2002) is a Hong Kong professional footballer who currently plays as a goalkeeper for Hong Kong Premier League club Southern and the Hong Kong national team.

== Club career ==
=== Southern ===
==== 2021–22 ====
On 3 August 2021, Ng joined Southern. He made his debut for the team in the league opener against Hong Kong Football Club where he conceded 20 seconds in to Robert Scott but saw the team mount a comeback in the dying moments to salvage a 2–1 victory. He kept his 5th shutout against Eastern, where he described a "godly" experience as he shared the same pitch with local footballing legend Yapp Hung Fai. Southern went on to with the game with 6 minutes left. He made 14 appearances in all competitions, and also held the most shutouts in the league prior to the league being cut short.

Ng extended his contract with Southern till the end of the 2022–23 season, taking a year off university.

==== 2022–23 ====
Following his contract extension, Ng continued to be the No.1 for Southern and made his first appearance for the team in a 2–0 win against HKU23. He was then awarded his first Man of The Match award of the season in a sudden 3–1 comeback against Lee Man which saw him make a ton of crucial saves to keep hopes alive. In a crucial FA Cup quarter-final fixture against Lee Man, a controversial decision by the referee which saw his teammate Lau Hok Ming sent off and a penalty awarded, he stepped up and saved Gavilan's penalty kick and another shot to secure a crucial 1–0 victory, continuing their unbeaten streak.

== International career ==
Ng was called up as an emergency backup in the 2023 AFC Asian Cup qualifiers due to all three of the goalkeepers being sick. He flew to the squad camp almost immediately, using his own wallet, but did not make an appearance for the team. He was also called up for the 2022 EAFF E-1 championship preliminary squad and made the final cut but failed to make an appearance.

Ng was called up for the preliminary squad ahead of the 2023 Merlion Cup and made the final cut. He made his Hong Kong national under-22's debut in a 1–0 victory over Singapore, keeping his first international cleansheet. He made his second appearance for the representative team in the Merlion Cup final, which saw the team lose 2–1 to Malaysia.

On 26 December 2023, Ng was named in the Hong Kong senior team's squad for the 2023 AFC Asian Cup.

On 5 September 2024, Ng made his international debut for Hong Kong in a friendly match against Solomon Islands.

== Career statistics ==
=== Club ===
As of 20 May 2023

Club	Season	League			National Cup		League Cup		Other		Total	
Club	Season	Division	Apps	Goals	Apps	Goals	Apps	Goals	Apps	Goals	Apps	Goals
Happy Valley	2019–20	Hong Kong Premier League	1	0	0	0	0	0	0	0	1	0
Happy Valley	2020–21	Hong Kong Premier League	0	0	0	0	0	0	0	0	0	0
Happy Valley	Total		1	0	0	0	0	0	0	0	1	0
Southern	2021–22	Hong Kong Premier League	4	0	1	0	9 (Note: Appearances in the Hong Kong Sapling Cup)	0	0	0	14	0
Southern	2022–23	Hong Kong Premier League	17	0	3	0	10	0	1	0	31	0
Southern	Total		21	0	4	0	19	0	1	0	45	0
Career total			22	0	4	0	19	0	1	0	46	0

=== International ===
As of 5 September 2024

National team	Year	Apps	Goals
Hong Kong	2024	1	0
Total		1	0

== Honours ==
=== Club ===
Southern

- Hong Kong Sapling Cup: 2022–23, 2024–25

=== Individual ===
- Best of U-22 Players in Southern: 2022–23
- Best of all U-22 Players: 2022–23
