= Mahama Awal =

Cameroonian-born Hong Kong footballer (born 1991)

Mahama Awal 艾華
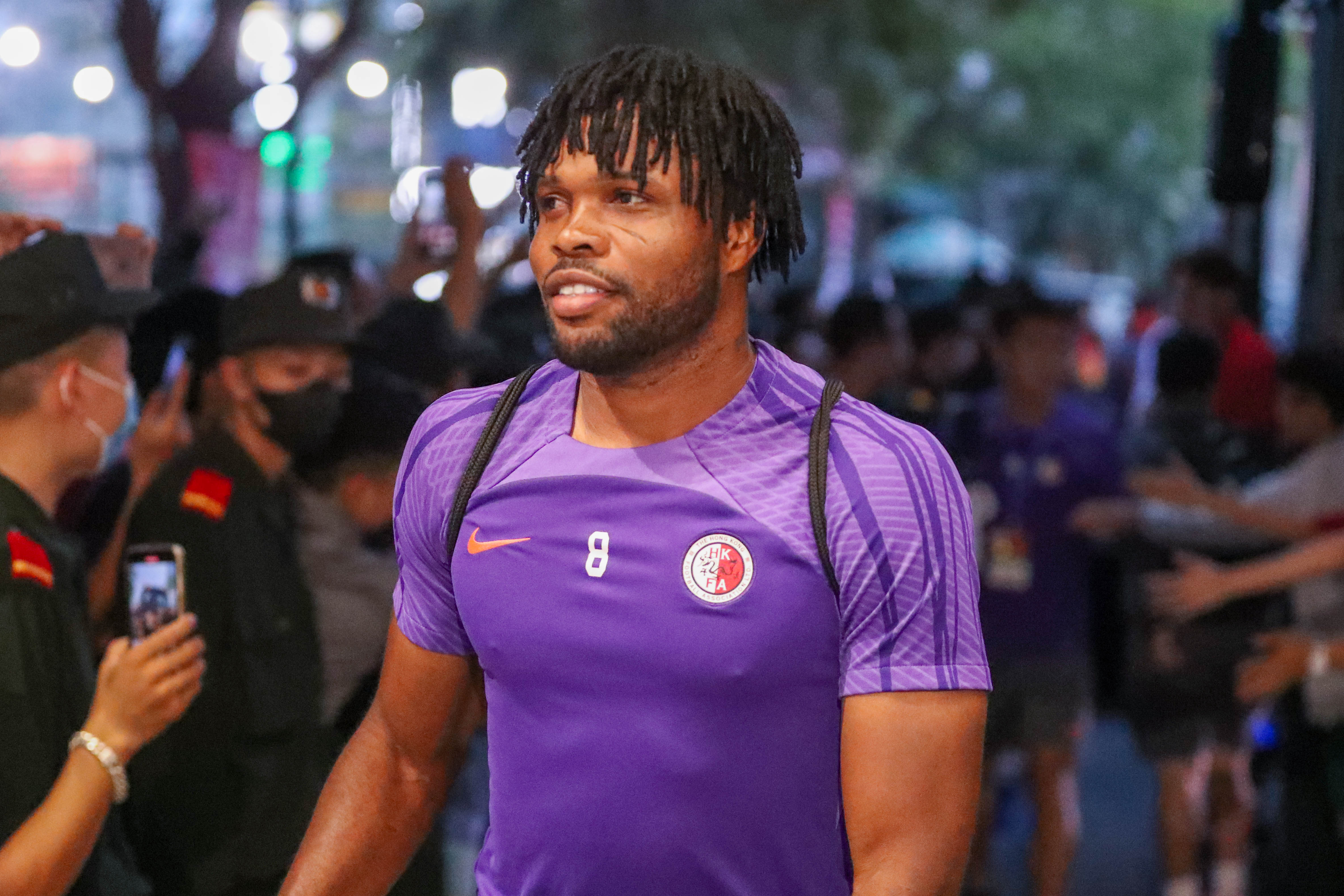
- Awal before the friendly match for Hong Kong vs Vietnam

Personal information
- Full name: Mahama Awal
- Date of birth: 10 June 1991 (age 35)
- Place of birth: Douala, Cameroon
- Height: 1.76 m (5 ft 9 in)
- Position: Winger

Team information
- Current team: Resources Capital

Youth career
- AJ Auxerre

Senior career*
Years	Team	Apps	(Gls)
2009–2014	Guangdong Sunray Cave	128	(31)
2015–2017	South China	38	(10)
2017–2019	Pegasus	32	(6)
2020	Pegasus	1	(0)
2021–2022	North District	13	(11)
2022–2026	Southern	63	(11)
2026–	Resources Capital	0	(0)

International career^{‡}
2023–2025	Hong Kong	15	(0)
- * Club domestic league appearances and goals as of 16 May 2026 ‡ National team caps and goals as of 14 October 2025

Mahama Awal (Chinese: 艾華; born 10 June 1991) is a former professional footballer who played as a winger. Born in Cameroon, he played for the Hong Kong national team.

== Club career ==
Awal joined China League One club Guangdong Sunray Cave in 2009. On 10 May 2009, he scored his first senior goal in the league match against Liaoning Whowin. He played with Guangdong Sunray Cave for six seasons, scoring 31 goals in 128 league appearances.

Awal transferred to Hong Kong Premier League side South China in January 2015. He made his debut for South China on 11 January against arch rival Kitchee. He scored the game-tying goal in the injury time which gave South China a 2-2 draw with Kitchee.

On 11 June 2017, Pegasus chairperson Canny Leung revealed that Awal along with three other South China players would be jumping ship to Pegasus.

On 8 July 2019, it was confirmed that Awal had left Pegasus after two seasons.

On 13 January 2020, Awal returned to Pegasus. His second stay, however, was cut short due to the 2020 coronavirus pandemic which caused the 2019–20 season to be suspended. On 8 April 2020, Awal agreed to a mutual termination with Pegasus.

On 29 July 2022, Awal joined Southern.

== International career ==
On 20 March 2023, Awal officially announced that he had received a Hong Kong passport after giving up his Cameroonian passport, making him eligible to represent Hong Kong internationally. He was then subsequently called up for international friendlies against Singapore and Malaysia for Hong Kong at the same day.

On 23 March 2023, Awal made his international debut for Hong Kong in a friendly match against Singapore.

== Career statistics ==
=== Club ===
As of 7 October 2023, Only includes career record in Hong Kong

Club	Season	League			National Cup		Other Cups		Continental		Other		Total	
Club	Season	Division	Apps	Goals	Apps	Goals	Apps	Goals	Apps	Goals	Apps	Goals	Apps	Goals
South China	2014–15	Hong Kong Premier League	4	1	1	1	0	0	4 (Note: Appearances in the AFC Cup)	4	0	0	9	6
South China	2015–16	Hong Kong Premier League	16	7	1	0	5 (Note: Appearances in the Sapling Cup)	1	9	2	8 (Note: Appearances in the League Cup and Senior Shield)	4	39	14
South China	2016–17	Hong Kong Premier League	18	4	4	1	0	0	0	0	1 (Note: Appearances in the Senior Shield)	0	23	5
South China	Total		38	12	6	2	5	1	13	6	9	4	71	25
Pegasus	2017–18	Hong Kong Premier League	17	5	2	0	5	1	–		1	1	25	7
Pegasus	2018–19	Hong Kong Premier League	15	1	1	0	5	3	–		0	0	21	4
Pegasus	2019–20	Hong Kong Premier League	1	0	2	0	3	2	–		0	0	6	2
Pegasus	Total		33	6	5	0	13	6	0	0	1	1	52	13
North District	2021–22	Hong Kong First Division	13	11	0	0	0	0	–		6 (Note: Appearances in the First Division League Cup)	2	19	13
Southern	2022–23	Hong Kong Premier League	17	2	3	3	10	3	–		1	1	31	9
Southern	2023–24	Hong Kong Premier League	4	2	0	0	0	0	–		1	2	5	4
Southern	Total		21	4	3	3	10	3	0	0	2	3	36	13
Hong Kong Career total			105	33	14	5	28	10	13	6	18	10	178	64

=== International ===
As of 14 October 2025

National team	Year	Apps	Goals
Hong Kong	2023	7	0
Hong Kong	2024	3	0
Hong Kong	2025	5	0
Total		15	0

#	Date	Venue	Opponent	Result	Competition
1	23 March 2023	Mong Kok Stadium, Mong Kok, Hong Kong	Singapore	1–1	Friendly
2	28 March 2023	Sultan Ibrahim Stadium, Johor, Malaysia	Malaysia	0–2	Friendly
3	15 June 2023	Lạch Tray Stadium, Hai Phong, Hong Kong	Vietnam	0–1	Friendly
4	19 June 2023	Hong Kong Stadium, So Kon Po, Hong Kong	Thailand	0–1	Friendly
5	7 September 2023	Phnom Penh Olympic Stadium, Phnom Penh, Hong Kong	Cambodia	1–1	Friendly
6	17 October 2023	Changlimithang Stadium, Thimphu, Bhutan	Bhutan	0–2	2026 FIFA World Cup qualification – AFC first round
7	16 November 2023	Azadi Stadium, Tehran, Iran	Iran	0–4	2026 FIFA World Cup qualification – AFC second round

== Honour ==
Southern

- Hong Kong Sapling Cup: 2022–23, 2024–25
