= 2018–19 Hong Kong FA Cup =

Tournament details
- Country: Hong Kong
- Teams: 10

Final positions
- Champions: Kitchee (6th title)
- Runners-up: Southern

Tournament statistics
- Matches played: 9
- Goals scored: 24 (2.67 per match)
- Attendance: 10,167 (1,130 per match)
- Top goal scorer(s): Matt Lam; Nacho Martínez; Jean Moser; Fernando; James Ha; Diego Higino (2 goals)

Awards
- Best player: Tse Tak Him

The 2018–19 Hong Kong FA Cup was the 45th edition of the Hong Kong FA Cup. 10 teams entered this edition, with two games played in First round before the Quarter-final stage. The competition was only open to clubs who participated in the 2018–19 Hong Kong Premier League, with lower division sides entering a separate competition.

The champion received HK$100,000 in prize money and the runners up received HK$40,000. The MVP of the final received a HK$10,000 bonus.

== Bracket ==
First round
**Dreams FC** | **2**
Eastern | 1
Hoi King | 0
**Yuen Long** | **2**

Quarter-finals
Tai Po | 1
**Dreams FC (a.e.t.)** | **2***
**Kitchee** | **6**
Lee Man | 0
Pegasus | 1 (3)
**Yuen Long (p)** | **1 (4)**
**Southern** | **1**
(China) R&F | 0

Semi-finals
Dreams FC | 1
**Kitchee** | **2**
Yuen Long | 0
**Southern** | **2**

Final
**Kitchee** | **2**
Southern | 0

Bold = winner
* = after extra time, ( ) = penalty shootout score

== Fixtures and results ==
=== First round ===
| 27 January 2019 | **Dreams FC** | **2–1** | Eastern | Sham Shui Po Sports Ground |
| 14:30 UTC+8 | Martínez 11'; Higino 42' | Report | Lam Hok Hei 85' | Attendance: 729; Referee: So Kai Man |

| 27 January 2019 | Hoi King | **0–2** | **Yuen Long** | Yuen Long Stadium |
| 14:30 UTC+8 | | Report | Moser 61'; Kessi 66' | Attendance: 564; Referee: Tang Hing Fu |

=== Quarter-finals ===
| 30 March 2019 | Tai Po | **1–2** (a.e.t.) | **Dreams FC** | Tseung Kwan O Sports Ground |
| 14:30 UTC+8 | Sandro 61' | Report | Higino 6'; Martínez 94' | Attendance: 495; Referee: Lau Fong Hei |

| 30 March 2019 | **Kitchee** | **6–0** | Lee Man | Mong Kok Stadium |
| 17:30 UTC+8 | Vadócz 36' (pen.); Li Ngai Hoi 45+2'; Lam 68', 74'; Jordi 77'; Fernando 89' | Report | | Attendance: 1,092; Referee: Ho Wai Sing |

| 31 March 2019 | Pegasus | **1–1** (a.e.t.) (**3–4** p) | **Yuen Long** | Sham Shui Po Sports Ground |
| 14:30 UTC+8 | Sasaki 75' | Report | Moser 90+1' | Attendance: 673; Referee: Tam Ping Wun |
| | **Penalties** |
| | Lazari (penalty scored); Sealy (penalty missed); Sasaki (penalty scored); Law Hiu Chung (penalty scored); Juninho (penalty missed); Wong Chun Ho (penalty missed) | | (penalty scored) Kessi; (penalty scored) Fábio; (penalty missed) Cheung Kin Fung; (penalty scored) Moser; (penalty missed) Wang Ruei; (penalty scored) Chan Hiu Fung |

| 31 March 2019 | **Southern** | **1–0** | (China) R&F | Tseung Kwan O Sports Ground |
| 17:30 UTC+8 | Ha 87' | Report | | Attendance: 529; Referee: Yu Kin Fung |

=== Semi-finals ===
| 11 May 2019 | Dreams FC | **1–2** | **Kitchee** | Mong Kok Stadium |
| 16:00 UTC+8 | Gondra 67' | Report | Lum 55'; Hélio 82' | Attendance: 976; Referee: Yu Kin Fung |

| 12 May 2019 | Yuen Long | **0–2** | **Southern** | Mong Kok Stadium |
| 16:00 UTC+8 | | Report | Rehman 15'; Ha 82' | Attendance: 1,454; Referee: Tang Hing Fu |

=== Final ===
| 25 May 2019 | **Kitchee** | **2–0** | Southern | Hong Kong Stadium |
| 16:00 UTC+8 | Lucas 85'; Fernando 90+8' | Report | | Attendance: 3,655; Referee: Tam Ping Wun |
