= Chan Yun Tung =

Hong Kong footballer

Personal information
- Full name: Tonio Chan Yun Tung
- Date of birth: 7 July 2002 (age 24)
- Place of birth: Sha Tin, New Territories, Hong Kong
- Height: 1.73 m (5 ft 8 in)
- Position: Right back

Team information
- Current team: Lee Man
- Number: 5

Youth career
- –2020: CFCSSHK

Senior career*
Years	Team	Apps	(Gls)
2020–2021	Happy Valley	2	(0)
2021–2022	Rangers (HKG)	0	(0)
2021–2022	→ HK U23 (loan)	4	(0)
2022–2023	HK U23	15	(0)
2023–2026	Southern	55	(2)
2026–	Lee Man	8	(2)

International career^{‡}
2019	Hong Kong U-19	1	(0)
2023	Hong Kong U-22	5	(0)
2026–	Hong Kong	1	(0)
Medal record
Men's football
Representing Hong Kong
FIFA ASEAN Challenge Cup
Winner	2026 Hong Kong
- * Club domestic league appearances and goals as of 20 November 2026 ‡ National team caps and goals as of 30 September 2026

Tonio Chan Yun Tung (Chinese: 陳潤潼; born 7 July 2002) is a Hong Kong professional footballer who currently plays as a right back for Hong Kong Premier League club Lee Man and the Hong Kong national team.

== Club career ==
On 13 June 2023, Chan joined Southern.

On 10 July 2026, Chan joined Lee Man.

== Internatinoal career ==
On 30 September 2026, Chan made his international debut for Hong Kong in the 2026 FIFA ASEAN Cup match against Brunei.

== Career statistics ==
=== Club ===
As of 6 November 2021

Club	Season	League			National Cup		League Cup		Other		Total	
Club	Season	Division	Apps	Goals	Apps	Goals	Apps	Goals	Apps	Goals	Apps	Goals
Happy Valley	2020–21	Hong Kong Premier League	2 (Note: 1 appearance in the Hong Kong Premier League relegation group)	0	0	0	0	0	0	0	2	0
Rangers	2021–22	Hong Kong Premier League	0	0	0	0	0	0	0	0	0	0
HK U23 (loan)	2021–22	Hong Kong Premier League	2	0	0	0	4 (Note: Appearances in the Hong Kong Sapling Cup)	1	0	0	6	1
Career total			4	0	0	0	4	1	0	0	8	1

=== International ===
As of 30 September 2026

National team	Year	Apps	Goals
Hong Kong	2026	1	0
Total		1	0

== Honours ==
=== Club ===
Southern

- Hong Kong Sapling Cup: 2024–25

=== International ===
Hong Kong

- FIFA ASEAN Challenge Cup: 2026
