= Jahangir Khan (footballer) =

Pakistani-born Hong Kong footballer (born 2000)

Jahangir Khan جهانگیر خان 簡嘉亨
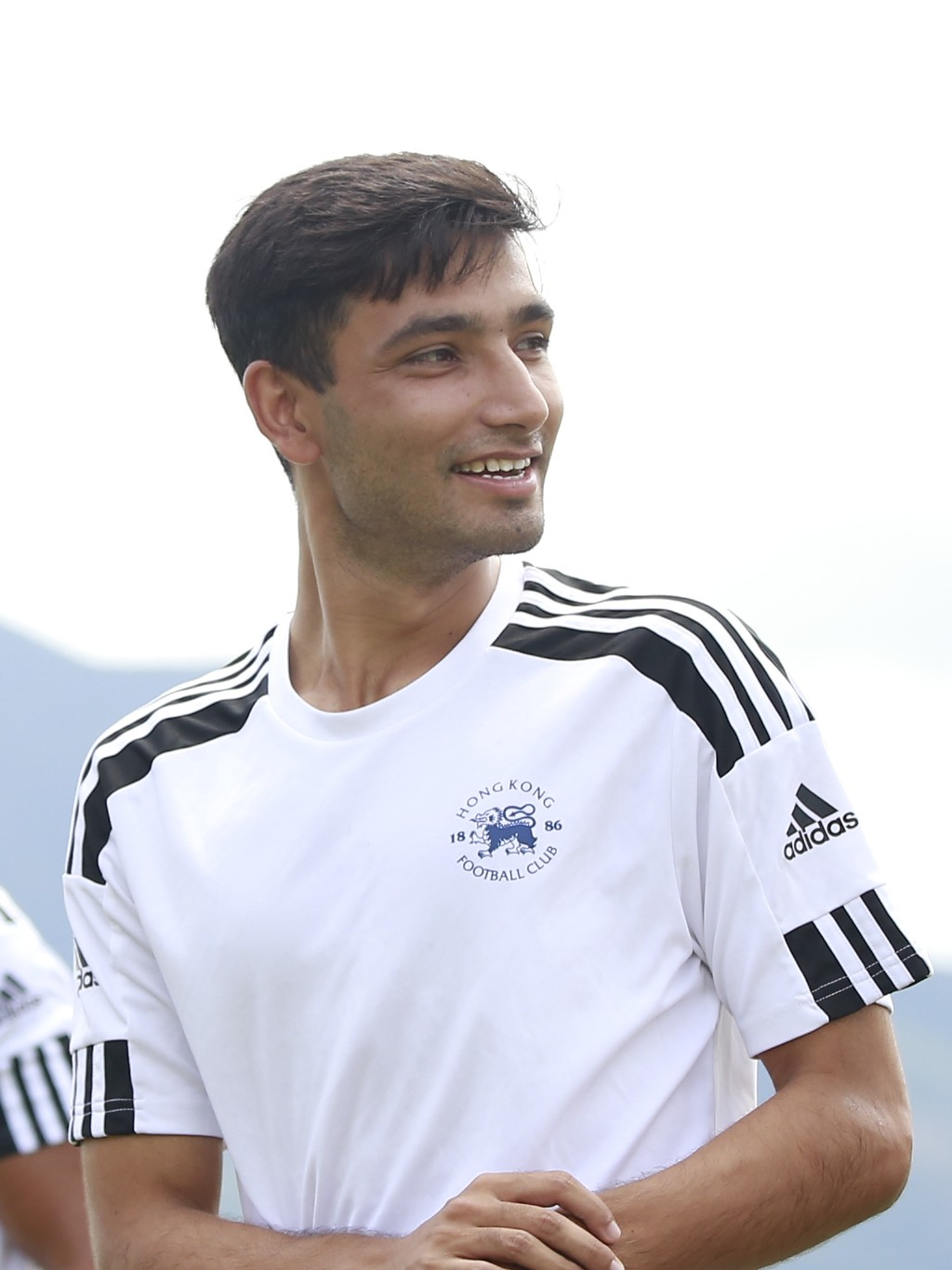

Personal information
- Full name: Jahangir Khan
- Date of birth: 3 October 2000 (age 26)
- Place of birth: Attock, Pakistan
- Height: 1.74 m (5 ft 9 in)
- Position: Winger

Team information
- Current team: North District
- Number: 19

Youth career
- 2010–2016: Eastern
- 2016–2018: All Black

Senior career*
Years	Team	Apps	(Gls)
2018–2021	Happy Valley	17	(1)
2019	→ Metro Gallery (loan)	12	(2)
2021–2023	Southern	22	(1)
2023–2024	HKFC	17	(1)
2024–	North District	53	(3)

International career^{‡}
2022	Hong Kong U-23		
2022	Hong Kong	9	(0)
- * Club domestic league appearances and goals as of 20 November 2026 ‡ National team caps and goals as of 24 September 2022

Jahangir Khan (Punjabi: جهانگیر خان; Chinese: 簡嘉亨; born 3 October 2000) is a professional footballer who currently plays as a winger for Hong Kong Premier League club North District. Born in Pakistan, he plays for the Hong Kong national team.

== Early life ==
Born in Attock, Pakistan, Khan moved to Hong Kong at the age of 10.

== Club career ==
=== Happy Valley ===
In August 2019, Khan was signed professionally by Happy Valley and was registered as a foreign player to play in the Hong Kong Premier League.

On 8 September 2020, Khan received his HKSAR passport, making him eligible to be registered as a local player in Hong Kong.

=== Southern ===
On 3 July 2021, Khan joined Southern. He played 4 games as a substitute for the club in HKPL and featured 9 times in Sapling Cup with 2 goals in his first season in Southern.

=== HKFC ===
On 29 July 2023, Khan joined HKFC.

=== North District ===
On 8 August 2024, Khan joined North District.

== International career ==
On 1 June 2022, Khan made his international debut for Hong Kong in the friendly match against Malaysia, which makes him the first South Asian-born player to represent Hong Kong.

== Career statistics ==
=== Club ===
As of 26 June 2021

Club	Season	League			Domestic Cup		Continental		Total	
Club	Season	Division	Apps	Goals	Apps	Goals	Apps	Goals	Apps	Goals
Metro Gallery (loan)	2018–19	Hong Kong First Division	12	2	2	0	0	0	14	2
Happy Valley	2019–20	Hong Kong Premier League	5	0	5 (Note: Appearances in the Hong Kong Sapling Cup)	0	0	0	10	0
Happy Valley	2020–21	Hong Kong Premier League	12	0	5	0	0	0	17	0
Career total			29	2	12	0	0	0	41	2

=== International ===
As of matches played 24 September 2022

National team	Year	Apps	Goals
Hong Kong	2022	9	0
Total		9	0

#	Date	Venue	Opponent	Result	Competition
1	1 June 2022	National Stadium Bukit Jalil, Kuala Lumpur, Malaysia	Malaysia	0–2	Friendly
2	8 June 2022	Salt Lake Stadium, Kolkata, India	Afghanistan	2–1	2023 AFC Asian Cup qualification – third round
3	11 June 2022	Salt Lake Stadium, Kolkata, India	Cambodia	3–0	2023 AFC Asian Cup qualification – third round
4	14 June 2022	Salt Lake Stadium, Kolkata, India	India	0–4	2023 AFC Asian Cup qualification – third round
5	19 July 2022	Kashima Stadium, Kashima, Japan	Japan	0–6	2022 EAFF E-1 Football Championship
6	24 July 2022	Toyota Stadium, Toyota, Japan	South Korea	0–3	2022 EAFF E-1 Football Championship
7	27 July 2022	Toyota Stadium, Toyota, Japan	China	0–1	2022 EAFF E-1 Football Championship
8	21 September 2022	Mong Kok Stadium, Mong Kok, Hong Kong	Myanmar	2–0	Friendly
9	24 September 2022	Hong Kong Stadium, Hong Kong	Myanmar	0–0	Friendly

== Honour ==
Southern

- Hong Kong Sapling Cup: 2022–23
