= Shu Sasaki =

Japanese footballer (born 1991)

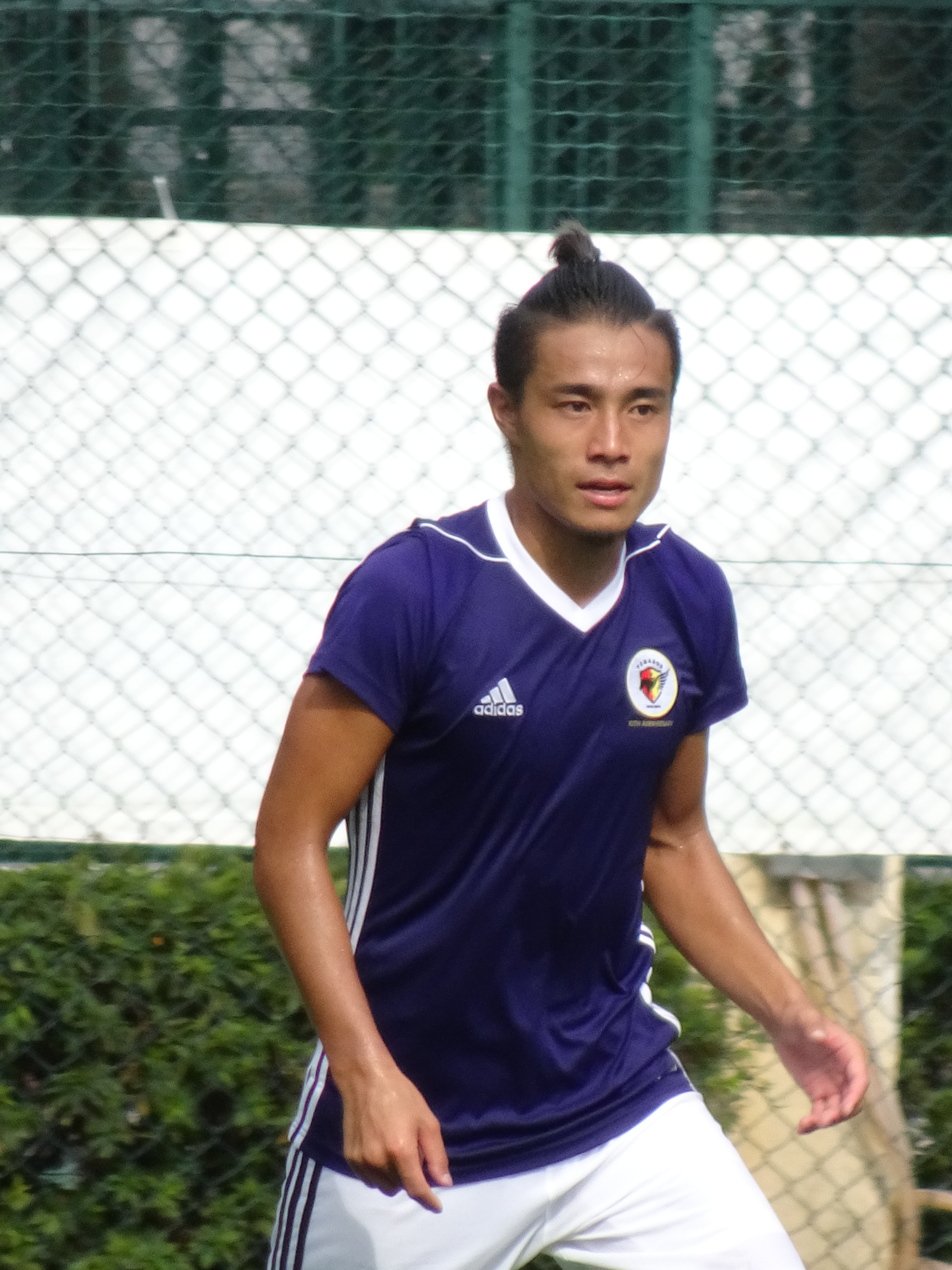

Personal information
- Full name: Shu Sasaki
- Date of birth: 12 February 1991 (age 35)
- Place of birth: Nara, Japan
- Height: 1.67 m (5 ft 5 1/2 in)
- Positions: Attacking midfielder; second striker

Team information
- Current team: Southern
- Number: 11

Youth career
- 2007–2019: Nara Ikuei High School

College career
Years	Team	Apps	(Gls)
2010–2014	Kansai University		

Senior career*
Years	Team	Apps	(Gls)
2012–2013	KUFC 2008	18	(7)
2014–2016	Blacktown Spartans	63	(18)
2017	Global Cebu	9	(3)
2018	Rangers (HKG)	7	(2)
2018–2020	Pegasus	25	(9)
2020–	Southern	109	(15)
- * Club domestic league appearances and goals as of 21 November 2026

Shu Sasaki (佐佐木 周, Sasaki Shū; born 12 February 1991) is a Japanese professional footballer who currently plays for Hong Kong Premier League club Southern.

== Career ==
Upon graduating from Kansai University where he played on the varsity team, Sasaki signed his first professional contract with the Blacktown Spartans of the National Premier Leagues in Australia. He played with them from 2014 to 2016, when the club were relegated.

In January 2017, Sasaki signed with Philippines Football League club Global Cebu. He made his debut on 24 January in a 2017 AFC Champions League qualifying play-off match against Sinaporean side Tampines Rovers. He scored his first goal for the club 5 April in a 2017 AFC Cup match against Indonesian side Johor Darul Ta'zim.

On 20 February 2018, Sasaki signed with Hong Kong Premier League club Rangers. He scored his first goal for the club on 4 March in a 2–2 draw against R&F.

Following Rangers' relegation to the Hong Kong First Division, Sasaki joined Pegasus on 2 July 2018.

On 8 April 2020, Sasaki agreed to a mutual termination with Pegasus after the club decided to cut costs due to the 2020 coronavirus pandemic and the subsequent suspension of the 2019–20 season.

On 2 May 2020, Southern announced the signing of Sasaki.

== Honour ==
Southern

- Hong Kong Sapling Cup: 2022–23, 2024–25
