= Yuen Ho Chun =

Hong Kong footballer

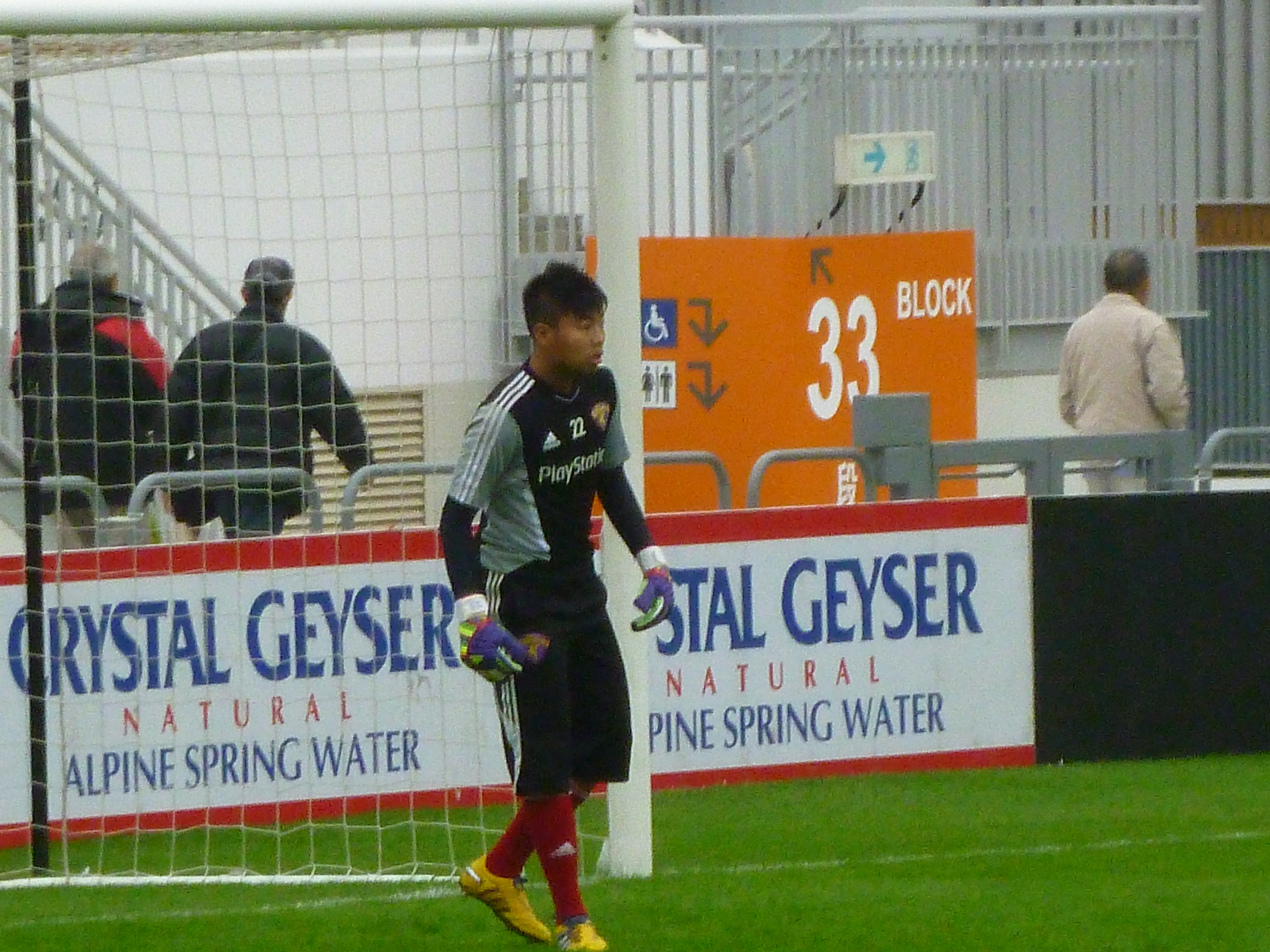

Personal information
- Full name: Yuen Ho Chun
- Date of birth: 19 July 1995 (age 31)
- Place of birth: Hong Kong
- Height: 1.82 m (6 ft 0 in)
- Position: Goalkeeper

Team information
- Current team: Eastern
- Number: 26

Youth career
- 2007–2009: South China
- 2009–2010: Wanchai

Senior career*
Years	Team	Apps	(Gls)
2010–2018	Pegasus	15	(0)
2014–2015	→ Tai Po (loan)	2	(0)
2018–2024	Lee Man	43	(0)
2024–2026	Kowloon City	29	(0)
2026–	Eastern	2	(0)

International career
2015–2018	Hong Kong U-23	6	(0)
- * Club domestic league appearances and goals as of 5 September 2026

Yuen Ho Chun (Chinese: 袁皓俊; born 19 July 1995) is a Hong Kong professional footballer who currently plays as a goalkeeper for Hong Kong Premier League club Eastern.

== Club career ==
In 2010, Yuen joined Hong Kong First Division club Pegasus.

In 2014, Yuen was loaned to Tai Po.

In 2015, Yuen returned to Hong Kong Premier League club Pegasus.

On 17 July 2018, Lee Man announced the signing of Yuen. Upon his debut for the club, he made a crucial error leading to a 2–0 loss against Kitchee on 31 August 2018.

On 18 July 2024, Yuen joined Kowloon City.

On 24 July 2026, Yuen joined Eastern.

== Honours ==
=== Club ===
Lee Man

- Hong Kong Sapling Cup: 2018–19
