= Sohgo Ichikawa =

Japanese-born Hong Kong footballer (born 2004)

Sohgo Ichikawa 趙聡悟
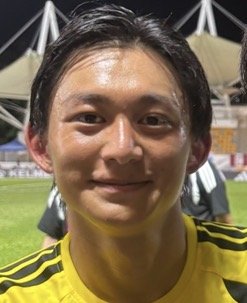
- Ichikawa in 2026

Personal information
- Full name: Sohgo Ichikawa
- Date of birth: 30 July 2004 (age 22)
- Place of birth: Osaka, Japan
- Height: 1.72 m (5 ft 8 in)
- Position: Attacking midfielder

Team information
- Current team: Lee Man
- Number: 11

Youth career
- 2016–2020: Kitchee

Senior career*
Years	Team	Apps	(Gls)
2020–2025	Kitchee	4	(1)
2023–2024	→ Southern (loan)	14	(1)
2024–2025	→ Southern (loan)	19	(0)
2025–2026	Southern	18	(1)
2026–	Lee Man	8	(2)

International career^{‡}
2018–2019	Hong Kong U15	4	(0)
2019	Hong Kong U16	2	(0)
2022	Hong Kong U20	3	(1)
2023–2025	Hong Kong U22	4	(2)
2021–	Hong Kong U23	12	(0)
2022–	Hong Kong	5	(0)
Medal record
Men's football
Representing Hong Kong
FIFA ASEAN Challenge Cup
Winner	2026 Hong Kong
- * Club domestic league appearances and goals as of 20 November 2026 ‡ National team caps and goals as of 30 September 2026

Sohgo Ichikawa (Chinese: 趙聡悟; Japanese: 市川 聡悟 Ichikawa Sogō; born 30 July 2004) is a professional footballer who currently plays as an attacking midfielder for Hong Kong Premier League club Lee Man. Born in Japan, he plays for the Hong Kong national team.

== Club career ==
In September 2020, Sohgo was promoted to the first team of Kitchee at the age of only 16.

On 12 July 2023, Sohgo joined Southern on loan for the 2023–24 season.

On 20 September 2024, Sohgo was loaned to Southern again for the 2024–25 season. After winning the title of the 2024–25 Hong Kong Sapling Cup, Southern chairman, Chan Man Chun, announced that Ichikawa would join the club on a permanent basis at the end of the season.

On 10 July 2026, Sohgo joined Lee Man.

On 11 September 2026, Sohgo scored his first goal for Lee Man since joining the club, scoring a brace in a 2-1 league win against Eastern District.

== International career ==
=== Youth level ===
In September 2019, Sohgo represented Hong Kong U-16 during the 2020 AFC U-16 Championship qualifiers.

In October 2021, Sohgo was selected for the Hong Kong U-23 during the 2022 AFC U-23 Asian Cup qualifiers where he made his debut against Japan U-23.

In October 2021, Sohgo was selected for the Hong Kong U-20 during the 2023 AFC U-23 Asian Cup qualifiers. He scored a goal in the match against Timor-Leste U-20 but lost all 3 matches in the qualifiers.

Sohgo is called up for the Hong Kong U-23 preliminary squad once again for 2023 Merlion Cup held in Singapore from 24 to 26 March 2023 in preparation for the upcoming 2024 AFC U-23 Asian Cup qualifiers held in September 2023.

=== Senior team ===
On 19 July 2022, Sohgo made his international debut for Hong Kong in the 2022 EAFF E-1 Football Championship against Japan at the age of only 17.

== Career statistics ==
=== Club ===
As of 20 September 2024

Club	Season	League			National Cup		League Cup		Continental		Other		Total	
Club	Season	Division	Apps	Goals	Apps	Goals	Apps	Goals	Apps	Goals	Apps	Goals	Apps	Goals
Kitchee	2019–20	Hong Kong Premier League	0	0	0	0	1 (Note: Appearances in the Sapling Cup)	0	0	0	0	0	1	0
Kitchee	2020–21	Hong Kong Premier League	1	0	0	0	5	0	0	0	0	0	6	0
Kitchee	2021–22	Hong Kong Premier League	1	1	1	0	9	1	0	0	0	0	11	2
Kitchee	2022–23	Hong Kong Premier League	1	0	0	0	6	1	0	0	0	0	7	1
Kitchee	2024–25	Hong Kong Premier League	1	0	0	0	0	0	0	0	0	0	1	0
Southern (loan)	2023–24	Hong Kong Premier League	14	1	1	0	11	1	0	0	1 (Note: Appearances in the Senior Shield)	0	27	2
Southern (loan)	2024–25	Hong Kong Premier League	0	0	0	0	0	0	0	0	0	0	0	0
Career total			18	2	2	0	32	3	0	0	1	0	53	3

=== International ===
As of 30 September 2026

National team	Year	Apps	Goals
Hong Kong	2022	1	0
Hong Kong	2023	0	0
Hong Kong	2024	0	0
Hong Kong	2025	1	0
Hong Kong	2026	3	0
Total		5	0

#	Date	Venue	Opponent	Result	Scored	Competition
1	19 July 2022	Kashima Stadium, Kashima, Japan	Japan	0–6	0	2022 EAFF E-1 Football Championship

== Honours ==
Kitchee

- Hong Kong Premier League: 2019–20, 2020–21, 2022–23
- Hong Kong Senior Challenge Shield: 2022–23
- Hong Kong FA Cup: 2022–23
- Hong Kong Sapling Cup: 2019–20

Southern

- Hong Kong Sapling Cup: 2024–25

Hong Kong

- FIFA ASEAN Challenge Cup: 2026
