= Chen Ngo Hin =

Hong Kong footballer

Personal information
- Full name: Chen Ngo Hin
- Date of birth: 27 February 2003 (age 23)
- Place of birth: Hong Kong
- Height: 1.74 m (5 ft 9 in)
- Position: Left winger

Team information
- Current team: Kowloon City
- Number: 11

Youth career
- –2021: Kitchee

Senior career*
Years	Team	Apps	(Gls)
2021–	Kitchee	13	(1)
2022–2024	→ Southern (loan)	27	(1)
2025–2026	→ Southern (loan)	14	(1)
2026–	→ Kowloon City (loan)	6	(0)

International career^{‡}
2022	Hong Kong U-19	4	(0)
2023–2025	Hong Kong U-22	10	(1)
- * Club domestic league appearances and goals as of 8 November 2026 ‡ National team caps and goals as of 6 September 2025

Chen Ngo Hin (Chinese: 陳傲軒; born 27 February 2003) is a Hong Kong professional footballer who currently plays as a left winger for Hong Kong Premier League club Kowloon City, on loan from Kitchee.

== Club career ==
On 23 September 2021, Chen was promoted to the first team of Kitchee.

On 11 August 2022, Chen was loaned to Southern for the 2022–23 season. His loan was extended for the 2023–24 season.

On 13 September 2025, Chen was loaned to Southern again for the 2025–26 season.

On 14 August 2026, Chen was loaned to Kowloon City for the 2026–27 season.

== Career statistics ==
=== Club ===
As of 26 May 2024

Club	Season	League			National Cup		League Cup		Other		Total	
Club	Season	Division	Apps	Goals	Apps	Goals	Apps	Goals	Apps	Goals	Apps	Goals
Kitchee	2021–22	Hong Kong Premier League	0	0	0	0	3 (Note: Appearances in the Sapling Cup)	0	0	0	3	0
Southern (loan)	2022–23	Hong Kong Premier League	4	0	2	0	2	2	0	0	8	2
Southern (loan)	2023–24	Hong Kong Premier League	16	1	1	0	9	1	2 (Note: Appearances in the Senior Shield)	0	28	2
Career total			20	1	3	0	14	2	2	0	39	4

== Honour ==
Southern

- Hong Kong Sapling Cup: 2022–23

Kitchee

- Hong Kong Senior Challenge Shield: 2023–24
- HKPLC Cup: 2023–24
