= Lau Hok Ming =

Hong Kong footballer

Lau Hok Ming 劉學銘
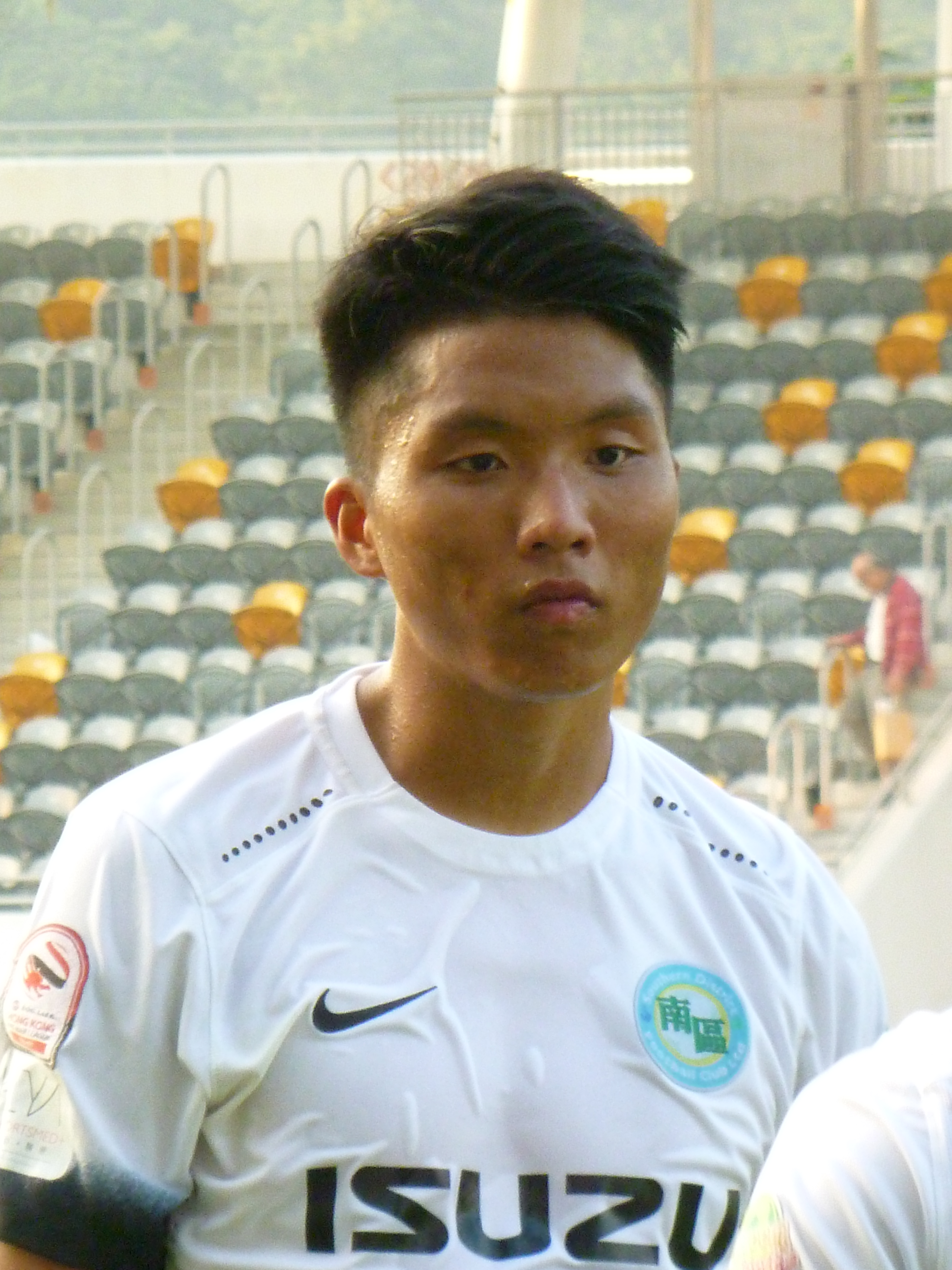

Personal information
- Full name: Ryan Lau Hok Ming
- Date of birth: 19 October 1995 (age 31)
- Place of birth: Hong Kong
- Height: 1.87 m (6 ft 2 in)
- Positions: Centre back; defensive midfielder

Youth career
- Kwai Tsing
- 2011–2012: Sham Shui Po

Senior career*
Years	Team	Apps	(Gls)
2013–2016	Metro Gallery	15	(1)
2016–2019	Southern	50	(4)
2019–2022	Eastern	0	(0)
2019–2020	→ Lee Man (loan)	4	(0)
2020–2021	→ Pegasus (loan)	10	(1)
2021–2022	→ Rangers (HKG) (loan)	3	(0)
2022–2023	Southern	18	(0)
2023–2024	HKFC	20	(0)

International career
2015–2018	Hong Kong U-22	10	(2)
2022	Hong Kong	2	(0)
- * Club domestic league appearances and goals as of 16 May 2026

Ryan Lau Hok Ming (Chinese: 劉學銘, born 19 October 1995) is a former Hong Kong professional footballer who played as a centre back.

== Club career ==
Lau was sent to Premier League football club Aston Villa and La Liga football club Barcelona for training.

=== Metro Gallery ===
On 26 November 2014, Lau scored his first goal of his football career for Metro Gallery against Yuen Long, in a match lost 1–2. On 27 September 2015, Lau scored his first goal for Dreams Metro Gallery against Yuen Long in a 3–2 win.

=== Southern ===
In June 2016, Lau signed for Southern. He made 50 appearances for the club and was a part of the club's 2018-19 Hong Kong FA Cup runner-up side. On 31 May 2019, Southern announced that Lau would depart the club after three seasons.

=== Eastern ===
On 1 June 2019, it was reported that Lau had signed with Eastern. This was confirmed on 17 July 2019 during the club's season opening media event.

=== Lee Man ===
On 1 September 2019, Lau was loaned to Lee Man for a year.

=== Pegasus ===
On 15 October 2020, Eastern head coach Lee Chi Kin revealed that Lau had been loaned to Pegasus.

=== Rangers ===
On 31 August 2021, Lau was loaned to Rangers.

=== Return to Southern ===
On 23 July 2022, Lau signed a contract to return to Southern after three seasons.

=== HKFC ===
On 29 July 2023, Lau joined HKFC.

== International career ==
On 1 June 2022, Lau made his international debut for Hong Kong in the friendly match against Malaysia.

== Career statistics ==
=== International ===
As of matches played 14 June 2022

National team	Year	Apps	Goals
Hong Kong	2022	2	0
Total		2	0

== Family ==
Lau Hok Ming's brother Lau Ka Ming is a former professional football player.

== Honour ==
Southern

- Hong Kong Sapling Cup: 2022–23
