= 2024–25 Hong Kong Sapling Cup =

Football tournament season

2024–25 JC Sapling Cup
Tournament details
- Country: Hong Kong
- Dates: 12 October 2024 – 1 May 2025
- Teams: 9

Final positions
- Champions: Southern
- Runners-up: Lee Man

Tournament statistics
- Matches played: 19
- Goals scored: 58 (3.05 per match)
- Attendance: 10,785 (568 per match)
- Top goal scorer(s): Matheus Chulapa; Michel Renner; Igor Sartori (3 goals each)

Awards
- Best player: Jonatan Acosta

The 2024–25 Hong Kong Sapling Cup (named as JC Sapling Cup for sponsorship reasons) was the 10th edition of the Hong Kong Sapling Cup. The competition was contested by the 9 teams in the 2024–25 Hong Kong Premier League. Each team was required to field a minimum of three players born on or after 1 January 2003 (U-22) and a maximum of six foreign players during every whole match.

Rangers were the defending champions, but were eliminated in the group stage. Southern became the champions for the second time after beating Lee Man in the final.

== Details ==
The champions of the JC Sapling Cup will receive HKD$120,000 in prize money, and HKD$100,000 donation to the champions' specified organization. Meanwhile, the runner-up will receive HKD$60,000, and HKD$50,000 donation to the runner-up's specified organization. In addition, the two losing teams in the semi-finals will receive HK$30,000 while the remaining teams will receive HK$15,000.

In addition, the best U-22 player in each team will receive a prize of HKD$3,000. The most outstanding U-22 player among the selected best U-22 players from each team will receive an additional HKD$5,000 for being the best of all the U-22 players.

== Format ==
The participating teams were divided into two groups for a single round-robin tournament. Top two teams in each group advance to the semi-finals.

== Calendar ==
Phase	Draw Date	Date	Matches	Clubs
Group stage	23 September 2024	12 October 2024 – 26 March 2025	16	9 → 4
Semi-finals	23 September 2024	9 – 16 April 2025	2	4 → 2
Final	23 September 2024	1 May 2025	1	2 → 1

== Fixtures and results ==
=== Group stage ===
==== Group A ====
Pos	Team	Pld	W	D	L	GF	GA	GD	Pts	Qualification
1	Tai Po	4	3	1	0	11	5	+6	10	Advance to Semi-finals
2	Eastern	4	2	1	1	9	4	+5	7	Advance to Semi-finals
3	North District	4	1	2	1	8	8	0	5 (Note: Head-to-head points: North District 1, Kitchee 1; Goal difference: North District 0, Kitchee −1)	
4	Kitchee	4	1	2	1	5	6	−1	5	
5	HKFC	4	0	0	4	3	13	−10	0	

Source: HKFA
Rules for classification: 1) Points; 2) Head-to-head points; 3) Head-to-head goal difference; 4) Head-to-head goals scored; 5) Goal difference; 6) Goals scored; 7) Fair-play points;
Notes:

13 October 2024	Tai Po	2–1	Eastern	Tai Po, New Territories
15:00	Sartori 12'; Cividini 82'	Report	Leung Kwun Chung 54'	Stadium: Tai Po Sports Ground; Attendance: 586; Referee: Ho Wai Sing

13 October 2024	HKFC	1–3	North District	Diamond Hill, Kowloon
15:00	Lam Chi Fung 70'	Report	Chulapa 5', 77'; Khan 65'	Stadium: Hammer Hill Road Sports Ground; Attendance: 155; Referee: Yu Kin Fung

16 November 2024	North District	1–1	Kitchee	Sheung Shui, New Territories
15:00	Chulapa 22'	Report	Welthon 15'	Stadium: North District Sports Ground; Attendance: 288; Referee: Wong Po Sing

16 November 2024	Eastern	4–0	HKFC	Tsing Yi, New Territories
18:00	Bertomeu 6', 38'; Hall 11'; Wong Ho Chun 72'	Report		Stadium: Tsing Yi Sports Ground; Attendance: 217; Referee: Poon Chun Kit

8 December 2024	Kitchee	3–1	HKFC	Diamond Hill, Kowloon
15:00	Law Tsz Chun 11'; Rey 27'; Mingazow 30'	Report	Scally 36'	Stadium: Hammer Hill Road Sports Ground; Attendance: 232; Referee: Luk Kin Sun

8 December 2024	Tai Po	3–3	North District	Sheung Shui, New Territories
15:00	Ho Chun Ting 56' (o.g.); Marcão 68'; Renner 72'	Report	Khan 39'; Kendy 41', 90+5' (pen.)	Stadium: North District Sports Ground; Attendance: 269; Referee: Woo Chun Sing

15 December 2024	North District	1–3	Eastern	Sheung Shui, New Territories
15:00	Yip Cheuk Man 34'	Report	Baffoe 59', 90+4'; Leung Kwun Chung 67'	Stadium: North District Sports Ground; Attendance: 221; Referee: Cheung Wai Lung

15 December 2024	Kitchee	0–3	Tai Po	Tsing Yi, New Territories
18:00		Report	Marcão 60'; Renner 67'; Sartori 90'	Stadium: Tsing Yi Sports Ground; Attendance: 290; Referee: Wong Po Sing

22 March 2025	HKFC	1–3	Tai Po	Siu Sai Wan, Hong Kong Island
15:00	Kedwards 87'	Report	Sartori 43' (pen.); Renner 74'; Padilla 90+4'	Stadium: Siu Sai Wan Sports Ground; Attendance: 592; Referee: Poon Chun Kit

22 March 2025	Eastern	1–1	Kitchee	Siu Sai Wan, Hong Kong Island
18:00	Gao Ming Ho 86'	Report	Haddow 50'	Stadium: Siu Sai Wan Sports Ground; Attendance: 592; Referee: Luk Kin Sun

==== Group B ====
Pos	Team	Pld	W	D	L	GF	GA	GD	Pts	Qualification
1	Southern	3	2	0	1	5	1	+4	6 (Note: Head-to-head points: Southern 3, Lee Man 3, Rangers 3; Head-to-head goal difference: Southern 0, Lee Man 0, Rangers 0; Head-to-head goals scored: Southern 1, Lee Man 1, Rangers 1; Goal difference: Southern +4, Lee Man +3, Rangers +1)	Advance to Semi-finals
2	Lee Man	3	2	0	1	5	2	+3	6	Advance to Semi-finals
3	Rangers	3	2	0	1	3	2	+1	6	
4	Kowloon City	3	0	0	3	2	10	−8	0	

Source: HKFA
Rules for classification: 1) Points; 2) Head-to-head points; 3) Head-to-head goal difference; 4) Head-to-head goals scored; 5) Goal difference; 6) Goals scored; 7) Fair-play points;
Notes:

12 October 2024	Rangers	0–1	Lee Man	Mong Kok, Kowloon
15:00		Report	Martínez 63'	Stadium: Mong Kok Stadium; Attendance: 574; Referee: Wong Wai Lun

12 October 2024	Southern	4–0	Kowloon City	Tsing Yi, New Territories
18:00	Gregory 10', 61'; Jackson 70'; Yau Cheuk Fung 90+1'	Report		Stadium: Tsing Yi Sports Ground; Attendance: 276; Referee: Tang Hing Fu

17 November 2024	Rangers	2–1	Kowloon City	Siu Sai Wan, Hong Kong Island
15:00	Lau Chi Lok 58', 74'	Report	Lam Hok Hei 82'	Stadium: Siu Sai Wan Sports Ground; Attendance: 410; Referee: Woo Chun Sing

17 November 2024	Lee Man	0–1	Southern	Siu Sai Wan, Hong Kong Island
18:00		Report	Chan Hoi Pak 58'	Stadium: Siu Sai Wan Sports Ground; Attendance: 410; Referee: Ho Wai Sing

15 December 2024	Kowloon City	1–4	Lee Man	Sham Shui Po, Kowloon
15:00	Yu Pui Hong 71'	Report	Rosa 7'; Seong Min-gyu 42' (o.g.); Law Cheuk Hei 53'; Yu Pui Hong 59' (o.g.)	Stadium: Sham Shui Po Sports Ground; Attendance: 455; Referee: Tang Hing Fu

26 March 2025	Southern	0–1	Rangers	Mong Kok, Kowloon
19:30		Report	Ibrahim 35'	Stadium: Mong Kok Stadium; Attendance: 297; Referee: Tam Ping Wun

== Knockout stage ==
=== Bracket ===
Semi-finals
16 April 2025
Tai Po	1 (2)
Lee Man(p)	1 (4)
9 April 2025
Southern	1
Eastern	0

Finals
1 May 2025
Lee Man	0
Southern	4

=== Semi-finals ===
9 April 2025	Southern	1–0	Eastern	Mong Kok Stadium
20:00	Pereira 90+4' (pen.)	Report		Attendance: 716; Referee: Tam Ping Wun

16 April 2025	Tai Po	1–1 (a.e.t.) (2–4 p)	Lee Man	Mong Kok Stadium
20:00	Moreno 90+3'	Report	Anier 82' (pen.)	Attendance: 1,133; Referee: Liu Kwok Man
	Penalties
	Lucas (penalty scored); Valverde (penalty scored); Montaño (penalty missed); Moreno (penalty missed)		(penalty scored) Simionato; (penalty scored) Tafazolli; (penalty scored) Everton; (penalty scored) Tachibana

=== Final ===
1 May 2025	Lee Man	0–4	Southern	Mong Kok Stadium
17:30		Report	Acosta 25'; Pereira 32'; Kessi 35'; Ichikawa 67'	Attendance: 3,072; Referee: Lau Fong Hei

== Top scorers ==
Rank	Player	Club	Goals
1	(Brazil) Matheus Chulapa	North District	3
1	(Brazil) Michel Renner	Tai Po	3
1	(Brazil) Igor Sartori	Tai Po	3
4	(Spain) Noah Baffoe	Eastern	2
4	(Spain) Víctor Bertomeu	Eastern	2
4	(Brazil) Gregory	Southern	2
4	(Brazil) Kendy	North District	2
4	(Hong Kong) Jahangir Khan	North District	2
4	(Hong Kong) Lau Chi Lok	Rangers	2
4	(Hong Kong) Leung Kwun Chung	Eastern	2
4	(Brazil) Marcão	Tai Po	2
4	(Hong Kong) Stefan Pereira	Southern	2

== Awards ==
=== Best U-22 Player ===
Prize	Team	Winner
Best U-22 Player in Each Team	Eastern	(Hong Kong) Ma Hei Wai
Best U-22 Player in Each Team	HKFC	(Hong Kong) James Wright
Best U-22 Player in Each Team	Kitchee	(Hong Kong) Chen Ngo Hin
Best U-22 Player in Each Team	Kowloon City	(Hong Kong) Ho Lung Ho
Best U-22 Player in Each Team	Lee Man	(Hong Kong) Timothy Chow
Best U-22 Player in Each Team	North District	(Hong Kong) Dai Tsz Hin
Best U-22 Player in Each Team	Rangers	(Hong Kong) Li Wing Ho
Best U-22 Player in Each Team	Southern	(Hong Kong) Sohgo Ichikawa
Best U-22 Player in Each Team	Tai Po	(Hong Kong) Lee Lok Him
Best of all U-22 Players	Southern	(Hong Kong) Sohgo Ichikawa
