= Tomas Maronesi =

Hong Kong footballer (born 1985)

Tomas Maronesi 杜馬思
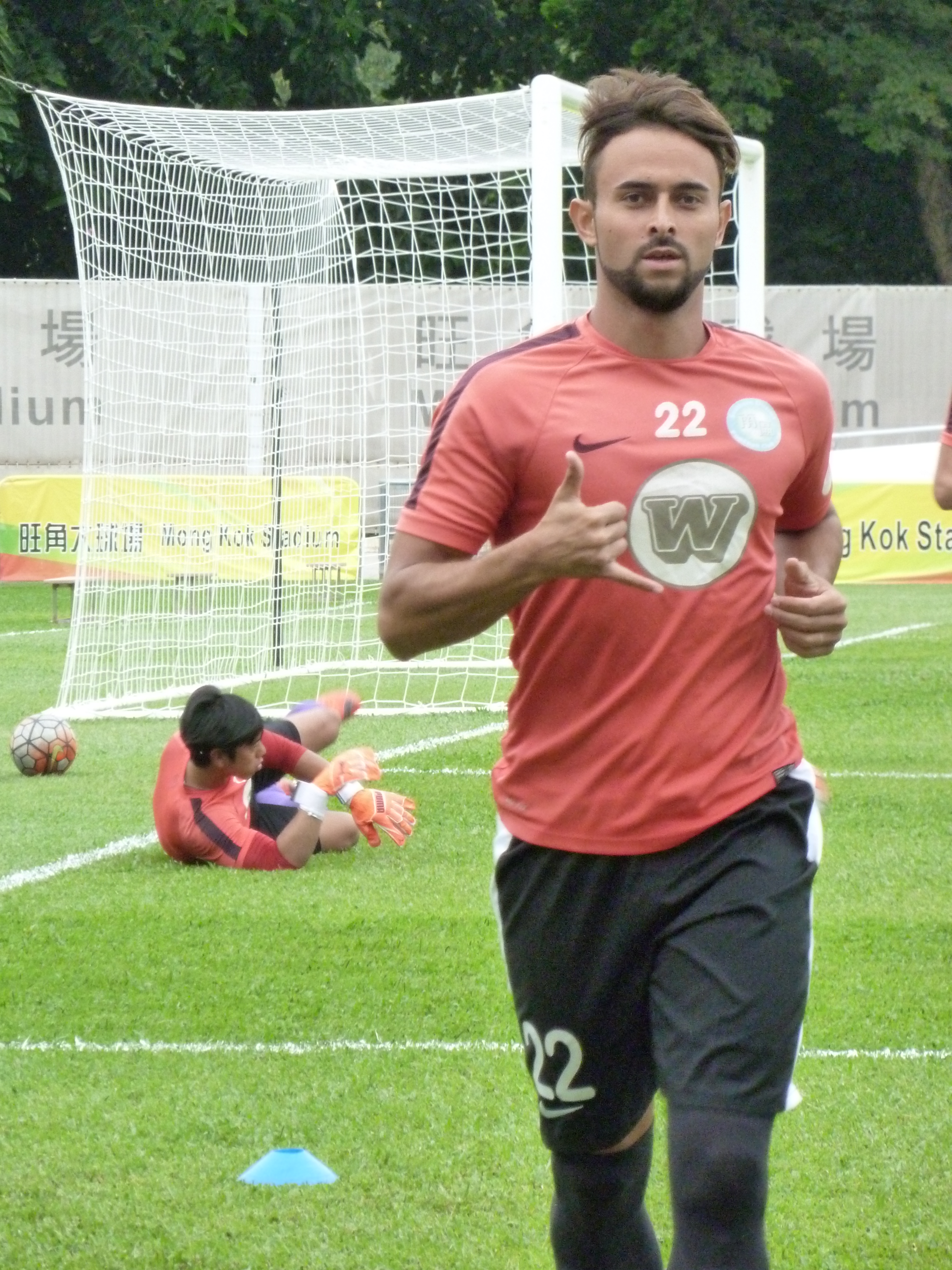

Personal information
- Full name: Tomas Maronesi
- Date of birth: 7 April 1985 (age 41)
- Place of birth: Santa Rosa, Brazil
- Height: 1.83 m (6 ft 0 in)
- Position: Center back

Senior career*
Years	Team	Apps	(Gls)
2008–2009	Marcílio Dias		
2009–2011	Ypiranga-RS	25	(2)
2011–2012	Concórdia	10	(1)
2012	Ypiranga-RS	6	(0)
2013–2014	Rangers (HKG)	18	(0)
2014–2015	Wong Tai Sin	14	(0)
2015–2017	Southern	26	(2)
2017–2019	Yuen Long	33	(5)
2019–2020	Rangers (HKG)	6	(0)
2020–2023	Kitchee	14	(3)
2023	→ Southern (loan)	8	(1)
2023–2024	Southern	15	(1)
2024–2025	Central & Western District	17	(1)
2025–	Tung Sing	21	(2)

International career^{‡}
2022	Hong Kong	2	(0)
- * Club domestic league appearances and goals as of 1 July 2024 ‡ National team caps and goals as of 14 June 2022

Tomas Maronesi (Chinese: 杜馬思; born 7 April 1985), commonly known as Tomas, is a former professional footballer who played as a centre back. Born in Brazil, he represented Hong Kong internationally.

== Club career ==
After failing to achieve success in Brazil, Tomas signed with Rangers of the Hong Kong First Division in 2013. He made his debut for the club in a 2–2 draw with Yuen Long.

On 2 August 2019, Rangers' Director Philip Lee announced that Tomas had signed a contract to return to the club.

On 20 May 2020, it was revealed that Tomas had signed with Kitchee.

On 31 January 2023, Tomas was loaned to Southern for the remainder of the season.

On 15 June 2023, Tomas joined Southern on a permanent deal.

== International career ==
On 19 October 2021, Tomas officially announced that he had received a Hong Kong passport, making him eligible to represent Hong Kong internationally.

On 8 June 2022, Tomas made his international debut for Hong Kong in the Asian Cup qualifiers against Afghanistan.

== Honours ==
Yuen Long

- Hong Kong Senior Shield: 2017–18

Kitchee

- Hong Kong Premier League: 2019–20

Southern

- Hong Kong Sapling Cup: 2022–23
