= Jean Moser =

Brazilian footballer

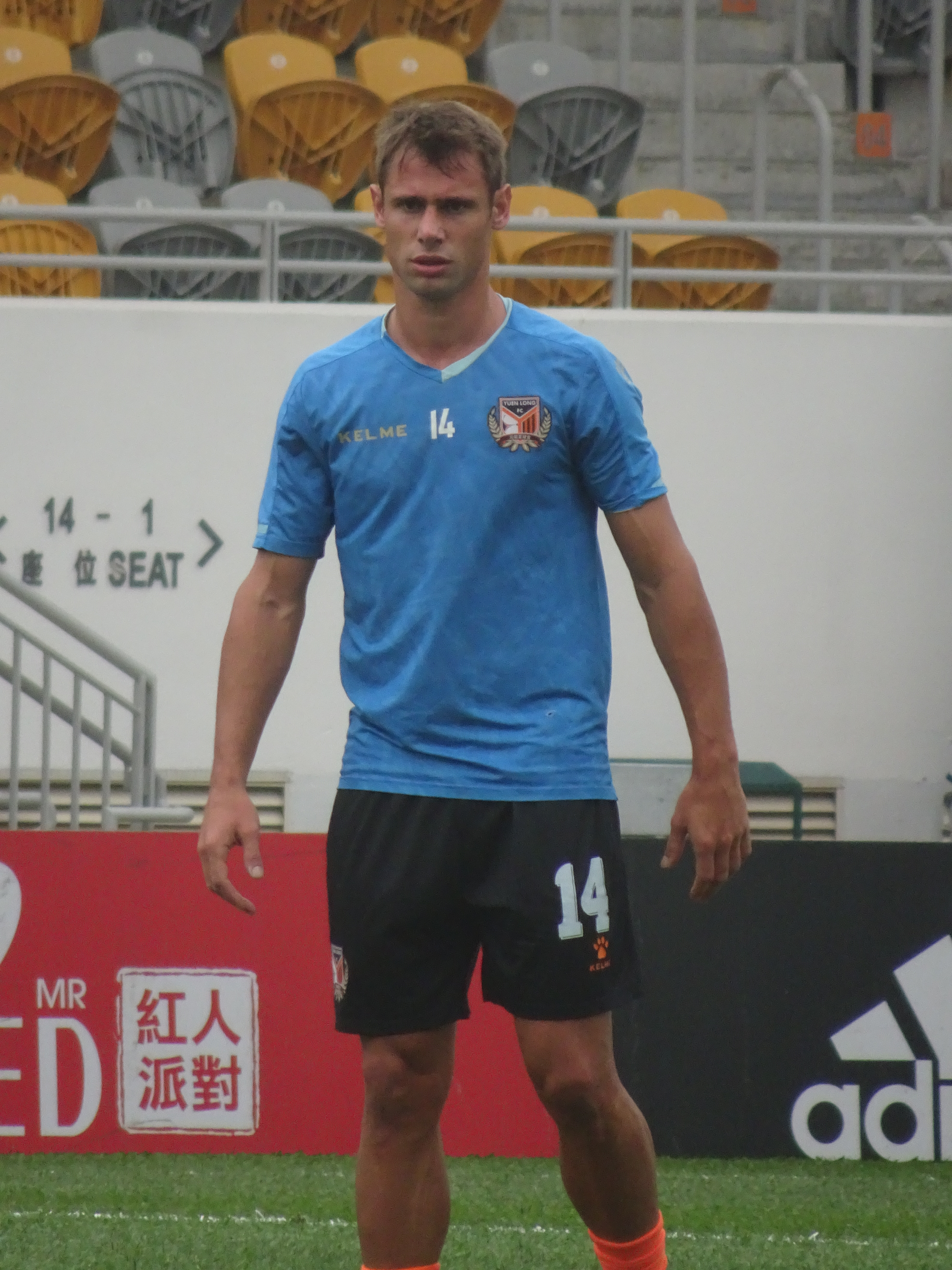

Personal information
- Full name: Jean Diego Moser
- Date of birth: 23 June 1993 (age 33)
- Place of birth: Santa Catarina, Brazil
- Height: 1.82 m (6 ft 0 in)
- Position: Forward

Team information
- Current team: Tainan City

Senior career*
Years	Team	Apps	(Gls)
2011–2013	Criciúma		
2013	Hercílio Luz FC		
2013–2014	Union Vöcklamarkt		
2015–2018	Metropolitano	8	(1)
2015	→ Zweigen Kanazawa (loan)	21	(4)
2016	→ Tochigi (loan)	14	(3)
2017–2018	Naxxar Lions	4	(0)
2018–2019	Yuen Long	17	(9)
2019–2020	Eastern	8	(2)
2020	→ Pegasus (loan)	1	(0)
2020–2021	Guarany Sporting Club	3	(0)
2021–2022	Central	6	(0)
2022	Asswehly SC		
2022	Krabi		
2023	Southern	11	(0)
2023–	Tainan City	2	(1)
- * Club domestic league appearances and goals as of 21 September 2023

Jean Diego Moser (born June 23, 1993) is a Brazilian professional footballer who plays as a forward and currently plays for Taiwan Football Premier League club Tainan City.

== Career statistics ==
Updated to 23 February 2016.

Appearances and goals by club, season and competition
Club	Season	League			Emperor's Cup		Total	
Club	Season	Division	Apps	Goals	Apps	Goals	Apps	Goals
Zweigen Kanazawa	2015	J2 League	21	4	1	0	22	4
Career total			21	4	1	0	22	4

== Honour ==
Southern

- Hong Kong Sapling Cup: 2022–23
