= Stefan Pereira =

Hong Kong footballer

Stefan Pereira 史堤芬彭利拿
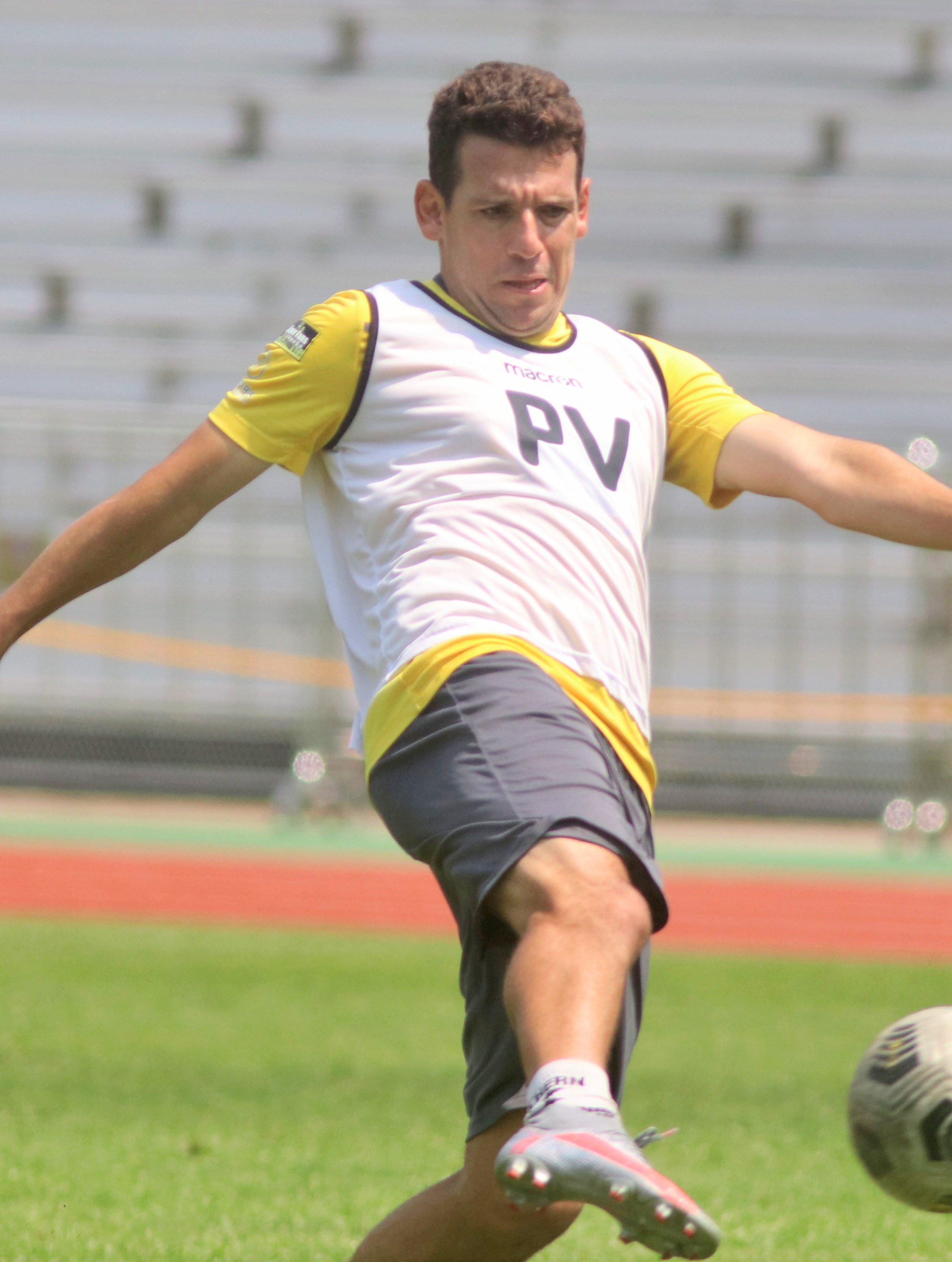

Personal information
- Full name: Stefan Figueiredo Pereira
- Date of birth: 16 April 1988 (age 38)
- Place of birth: Brumado, Brazil
- Height: 1.74 m (5 ft 9 in)
- Position: Forward

Team information
- Current team: Southern
- Number: 7

Youth career
- 1999–2008: Vitória
- 2008: Atlético Paranaense

Senior career*
| Years | Team | Apps | (Gls) |
| 2009 | Camaçari | 7 | (2) |
| 2010 | Cruzeiro–RS | 0 | (0) |
| 2010 | América | 2 | (0) |
| 2011 | Camaçari | 13 | (3) |
| 2012 | Rapid București | 2 | (0) |
| 2013 | Jacuipense | 7 | (3) |
| 2013–2014 | Citizen | 19 | (7) |
| 2014 | Jacuipense | 1 | (0) |
| 2015–2016 | Olimpic Sarajevo | 29 | (7) |
| 2016–2017 | Yuen Long | 24 | (11) |
| 2017–2019 | Lee Man | 31 | (9) |
| 2019–2020 | Rangers (HKG) | 0 | (0) |
| 2019–2020 | → Citizen (loan) | 13 | (19) |
| 2020– | Southern | 114 | (59) |

International career^{‡}
| 2024–2025 | Hong Kong | 21 | (1) |
- * Club domestic league appearances and goals as of 21 November 2026 ‡ National team caps and goals as of 18 November 2025

Stefan Figueiredo Pereira (Chinese: 史提芬彭利拿; born 16 April 1988) is a professional footballer who currently plays as a forward for Hong Kong Premier League club Southern. Born in Brazil, he plays for the Hong Kong national team.

== Club career ==
On 1 January 2015, Pereira signed for Olimpic Sarajevo. Through the very last days of January to the beginning of April he scored a total of seven goals in seven matches, counting two friendly matches, two in the cup and three in the domestic league as well as five assists; three in two league matches and two in the cup.

On 17 July 2017, Pereira was officially announced as a Lee Man player during the club's first ever training session. It was revealed on 10 April 2018, that his contract with Lee Man would be extended for the 2018–19 season.

On 29 May 2019, Pereira announced his departure from Lee Man via social media.

In the new season, Pereira signed with Rangers and he was immediately loaned to Citizen. On 23 January 2020, after spending half of the season in the Hong Kong First Division, Pereira was called back by Rangers and returned to the HKPL.

On 6 June 2020, Southern announced the signing of Pereira.

== International career ==
On 12 December 2023, it was announced that Pereira had received his HKSAR passport after giving up his Brazilian passport, making him eligible to represent Hong Kong internationally. He was then subsequently called up for the local training camp in preparation of the 2023 AFC Asian Cup. On 26 December 2023, he was named in Hong Kong's final squad for the Asian Cup.

On 1 January 2024, Pereira made his international debut for Hong Kong in a friendly match against China.

On 10 June 2025, Stefan scored his first senior international goal for Hong Kong in the 2027 AFC Asian Cup qualification match against India.

== Career statistics ==
=== International ===
As of 18 November 2025

| National team | Year | Apps | Goals |
|---|---|---|---|
| Hong Kong | 2024 | 12 | 0 |
| Hong Kong | 2025 | 9 | 1 |
| Total | | 21 | 1 |

| # | Date | Venue | Opponent | Result | Competition |
|---|---|---|---|---|---|
| 1 | 1 January 2024 | Baniyas Stadium, Abu Dhabi, United Arab Emirates | China | 2–1 | Friendly |
| 2 | 14 January 2024 | Khalifa International Stadium, Al Rayyan, Qatar | United Arab Emirates | 1–3 | 2023 AFC Asian Cup |
| 3 | 19 January 2024 | Khalifa International Stadium, Al Rayyan, Qatar | Iran | 0–1 | 2023 AFC Asian Cup |
| 4 | 23 January 2024 | Abdullah bin Khalifa Stadium, Doha, Qatar | Palestine | 0–3 | 2023 AFC Asian Cup |
| 5 | 21 March 2024 | Mong Kok Stadium, Mong Kok, Hong Kong | Uzbekistan | 0–2 | 2026 FIFA World Cup qualification – AFC second round |
| 6 | 6 June 2024 | Hong Kong Stadium, So Kon Po, Hong Kong | Iran | 2–4 | 2026 FIFA World Cup qualification – AFC second round |
| 7 | 11 June 2024 | Ashgabat Stadium, Ashgabat, Turkmenistan | Turkmenistan | 0–0 | 2026 FIFA World Cup qualification – AFC second round |

=== International goals ===
| No. | Date | Cap | Venue | Opponent | Score | Result | Competition |
|---|---|---|---|---|---|---|---|
| 1. | 10 June 2025 | 16 | Kai Tak Stadium, Hong Kong | India | 1–0 | 1–0 | 2027 AFC Asian Cup qualification |

== Honours ==
=== Club ===
Olimpic Sarajevo

- Bosnia and Herzegovina Football Cup: 2014–15

Lee Man

- Hong Kong Sapling Cup: 2018–19

Southern

- Hong Kong Sapling Cup: 2022–23, 2024–25
