= Kessi =

Brazilian footballer

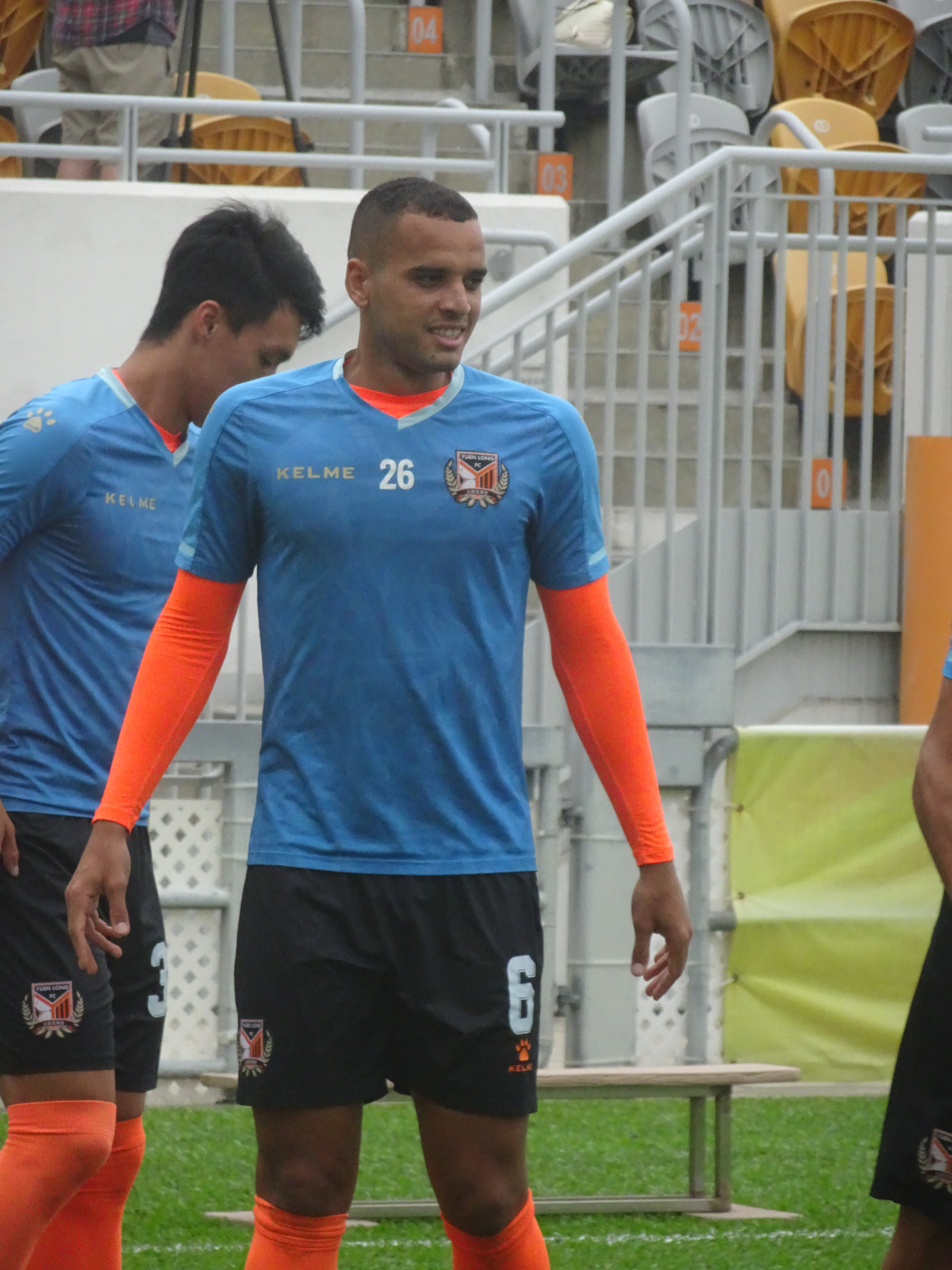

Personal information
- Full name: Kessi Isac dos Santos
- Date of birth: 26 October 1994 (age 32)
- Place of birth: Arapiraca, Brazil
- Height: 1.86 m (6 ft 1 in)
- Position: Midfielder

Team information
- Current team: Kowloon City
- Number: 6

Youth career
- 2002–2013: ASA
- 2013: → Vitória (loan)

Senior career*
Years	Team	Apps	(Gls)
2013–2018	ASA	26	(2)
2014	→ Penedense (loan)	5	(1)
2014	→ União Palmeirense (loan)	0	(0)
2017	→ Lagarto (loan)	7	(1)
2018	Rio Branco	9	(2)
2018–2020	Yuen Long	25	(1)
2020–2021	Pegasus	16	(1)
2021–2022	Santa Maria	8	(0)
2022–2025	Southern	54	(7)
2025–	Kowloon City	23	(3)
- * Club domestic league appearances and goals as of 5 September 2026

Kessi Isac dos Santos (born 26 October 1994), commonly known as Kessi, is a Brazilian professional footballer who currently plays as a midfielder for Hong Kong Premier League club Kowloon City.

== Club career ==
On 3 August 2022, Kessi joined Southern.

On 24 July 2025, Kessi joined Kowloon City.

== Career statistics ==
=== Club ===
As of 19 May 2019.

Club	Season	National League			National Cup		League Cup		Other		Total	
Club	Season	Division	Apps	Goals	Apps	Goals	Apps	Goals	Apps	Goals	Apps	Goals
ASA	2013	Série B	1	0	0	0	1 (Note: Appearances in the Copa do Nordeste)	0	0	0	2	0
ASA	2014	Série C	0	0	0	0	0	0	0	0	0	0
ASA	2015	Série C	0	0	0	0	0	0	2 (Note: Appearances in the Campeonato Alagoano)	0	2	0
ASA	2016	Série C	4	0	1 (Note: Appearances in the Copa do Brasil)	0	0	0	12	2	17	2
ASA	2017	Série C	5	0	0	0	0	0	0	0	5	0
ASA	Total		10	0	1	0	1	0	14	2	26	2
Penedense (loan)	2014	–			0	0	0	0	5	1	5	1
Lagarto (loan)	2017	–			0	0	0	0	7 (Note: Appearances in the Campeonato Sergipano)	1	7	1
Rio Branco	2018	–			0	0	0	0	9 (Note: Appearances in the Campeonato Paranaense)	2	9	2
Yuen Long	2018–19	Hong Kong Premier League	16	1	3 (Note: Appearances in the Hong Kong FA Cup)	1	6 (Note: Appearance in the Hong Kong Sapling Cup)	0	1 (Note: One appearance and one goal in the Hong Kong Senior Shield)	0	26	2
Career total			26	1	4	1	7	0	36	6	73	8

== Honour ==
Southern

- Hong Kong Sapling Cup: 2022–23, 2024–25
