= Yip Cheuk Man =

Hong Kong footballer

Personal information
- Full name: Yip Cheuk Man
- Date of birth: 12 October 2001 (age 25)
- Place of birth: Hong Kong
- Height: 1.81 m (5 ft 11 in)
- Position: Centre back

Youth career
- 2013–2017: CFCSSHK
- 2017–2018: Happy Valley

Senior career*
Years	Team	Apps	(Gls)
2018–2019	CFCSSHK	25	(2)
2019–2021	Happy Valley	16	(1)
2021–2023	Resources Capital	18	(2)
2023–2025	North District	19	(1)
2025–	Hoi King	19	(2)

International career
2018–2019	Hong Kong U-19	7	(0)
2021–2023	Hong Kong U-22	6	(0)
- * Club domestic league appearances and goals as of 16 May 2026

Yip Cheuk Man (Chinese: 葉卓文; born 12 October 2001) is a former Hong Kong professional footballer who played as a centre back.

== Club career ==
In August 2019, Yip signed his first professional contract with Hong Kong Premier League club Happy Valley.

On 19 August 2021, Yip joined Resources Capital.

On 12 July 2023, Yip joined North District.
