= Hong Kong Sapling Cup =

Association football tournament in Hong Kong

- Founded: 2015
- Abolished: 2025
- Region: Hong Kong
- Teams: 9
- Last champions: Southern (2nd title)
- Most championships: Kitchee; Southern (2 titles)

Hong Kong Sapling Cup (Chinese: 菁英盃) was a Hong Kong domestic football competition contested by the Hong Kong Premier League teams. The objective of the Cup was to provide more playing opportunities for youth players. It was discontinued after the 2024–25 season.

HK$120,000 reward goes to the winners, with the runners-up getting HK$60,000. The two other losing semi-finalists receive HK$30,000. The remaining teams get HK$15,000. The best under-22 player from each team gets HK$3,000, and player of the tournament earns an additional HK$5,000. The last Sapling Cup holder is Southern.

== Competition name and rules ==
Season	Name	Logo	Format	Rules
2015–16	Henderson Sapling Cup (Sponsorship from Henderson Land Development)		Participating teams are divided into two groups for a single round-robin tournament. Top two advance to the semi-finals.	Each team must have no fewer than two players under the age of 21 and no more than six foreign players at any time.
2016–17	R&F Properties Sapling Cup (Sponsorship from R&F Properties)		Participating teams compete in a single-elimination tournament.	Each team must have no fewer than two players under the age of 21 and no more than six foreign players at any time.
2017–18	Sapling Cup (No sponsorship)		Participating teams are divided into two groups for a single round-robin tournament. Top two advance to the semi-finals.	Each team must have no fewer than two players under the age of 22 and no more than four foreign players at any time.
2018–19	Sapling Cup (No sponsorship)		Participating teams are divided into two groups for a single round-robin tournament. Top two advance to the semi-finals.	Each team must have no fewer than two players under the age of 22 and no more than four foreign players at any time.
2019–20	Sapling Cup (No sponsorship)		Participating teams are divided into two groups for a double round-robin tournament. Top team advances to the final.	Each team must have no fewer than three players under the age of 22 and no more than four foreign players at any time.
2020–21	Sapling Cup (No sponsorship)		Participating teams are divided into two groups for a double round-robin tournament. Top two advance to the semi-finals.	Each team must have no fewer than three players under the age of 22 and no more than four foreign players at any time.
2021–22	Sapling Cup (No sponsorship)		Participating teams compete in a double round-robin tournament.	Each team must have no fewer than three players under the age of 22 and no more than four foreign players at any time.
2022–23	JC Sapling Cup (Sponsorship from Hong Kong Jockey Club)		Participating teams are divided into two groups for a double round-robin tournament. Top two advance to the semi-finals.	Each team must have no fewer than three players under the age of 22 and no more than four foreign players at any time.
2023–24	JC Sapling Cup (Sponsorship from Hong Kong Jockey Club)		Participating teams are divided into two groups for a double round-robin tournament. Top two advance to the semi-finals.	Each team must have no fewer than three players under the age of 22 and no more than four foreign players at any time.
2024–25	JC Sapling Cup (Sponsorship from Hong Kong Jockey Club)		Participating teams are divided into two groups for a single round-robin tournament. Top two advance to the semi-finals.	Each team must have no fewer than three players under the age of 22 and no more than four foreign players at any time.

== Finals ==
=== Key ===
*	Match went to extra time
†	Match decided by a penalty shootout after extra time

=== Results ===
Edition	Season	Winners	Score	Runners-up	Venue	Attendance
1	2015–16	Pegasus	1–1 †	South China	Mong Kok Stadium	2,150
2	2016–17	Tai Po	2–1 *	Pegasus	Mong Kok Stadium	2,956
3	2017–18	Kitchee	2–1	Tai Po	Hong Kong Stadium	2,165
4	2018–19	Lee Man	3–2 *	Yuen Long	Mong Kok Stadium	2,685
5	2019–20	Kitchee	3–1	Southern	Tseung Kwan O Sports Ground	0
6	2020–21	Eastern	2–0	Happy Valley	Mong Kok Stadium	2,243
7	2021–22	Cancelled due to COVID-19 pandemic in Hong Kong				
8	2022–23	Southern	2–0	Lee Man	Mong Kok Stadium	2,519
9	2023–24	Rangers	1–0	Kitchee	Mong Kok Stadium	3,769
10	2024–25	Southern	4–0	Lee Man	Mong Kok Stadium	3,072

==== Notes ====
1. Match was played behind closed doors due to the 2020 coronavirus pandemic in Hong Kong.

== Performance by teams ==
Team	Wins	Last final won	Runners-up	Last final lost
Kitchee	2	2019–20	1	2023–24
Southern	2	2024–25	1	2020–21
Lee Man	1	2018–19	2	2024–25
Pegasus	1	2015–16	1	2016–17
Tai Po	1	2016–17	1	2017–18
Eastern	1	2020–21	–	–
Rangers	1	2023–24	–	–
South China	–	–	1	2015–16
Yuen Long	–	–	1	2018–19
Happy Valley	–	–	1	2020–21

== Players record ==
=== Most appearances ===
Rank	Player	Apps
1	(Japan) Shu Sasaki	53
2	(Hong Kong) Leung Kwun Chung	44
2	(Hong Kong) Wong Chun Ho	44
4	(Hong Kong) Cheng Chin Lung	43
4	(Hong Kong) Cheng Tsz Sum	43
4	(Hong Kong) Stefan Pereira	43
4	(Hong Kong) Yu Wai Lim	43
8	(Hong Kong) Lam Ka Wai	42
8	(Hong Kong) Wu Chun Ming	42
10	(Hong Kong) Chan Hoi Pak	41
10	(Brazil) Kessi	41
10	(Hong Kong) Lam Hin Ting	41
10	(Hong Kong) Tomas Maronesi	41

=== Top scorers ===
Rank	Player	Goals	Apps	Ratio
1	(Hong Kong) Stefan Pereira	32	43	0.74
2	(Brazil) Mikael	19	33	0.58
2	(Hong Kong) Everton Camargo	19	38	0.5
4	(Brazil) Lucas Silva	17	23	0.74
4	(Hong Kong) Juninho	17	32	0.53
6	(Hong Kong) Mahama Awal	15	37	0.41
6	(Japan) Shu Sasaki	15	53	0.28
8	(Hong Kong) Sandro	14	17	0.82
8	(Australia) Travis Major	14	19	0.74
10	(Hong Kong) Wellingsson de Souza	13	29	0.45
10	(Hong Kong) Sun Ming Him	13	33	0.39

== See also ==
- The Football Association of Hong Kong, China
- Hong Kong Premier League
