= 2022–23 Hong Kong Premier League =

Hong Kong Premier League
- Season: 2022–23
- Dates: 27 August 2022 – 14 May 2023
- Champions: Kitchee
- 2023–24 AFC Champions League: Kitchee; Lee Man; Rangers
- Matches: 90
- Goals: 286 (3.18 per match)
- Top goalscorer: (Montenegro) Dejan Damjanović (Turkmenistan) Ruslan Mingazov (Brazil) Everton Camargo (17 goals)
- Biggest home win: Lee Man 10–0 HK U23 (15 October 2022)
- Biggest away win: Sham Shui Po 0–10 Kitchee (18 September 2022)
- Highest scoring: Lee Man 10–0 HK U23 (15 October 2022); Sham Shui Po 0–10 Kitchee (18 September 2022)
- Longest winning run: 11 matches Kitchee
- Longest unbeaten run: 11 matches Kitchee
- Longest winless run: 18 matches HK U23
- Longest losing run: 14 matches HK U23
- Highest attendance: 6,489; Kitchee 2–2 Lee Man (7 May 2023)
- Lowest attendance: 135; HK U23 1–1 HKFC (19 March 2023)
- Total attendance: 67,454
- Average attendance: 749

The 2022–23 Hong Kong Premier League (also known as the BOC Life Hong Kong Premier League for sponsorship reasons) was the 9th season of the Hong Kong Premier League, the top division of Hong Kong football.

== Teams ==
A total of 10 teams contest the league, including 8 teams from the 2021–22 Hong Kong Premier League and 2 teams promoted from the 2021–22 Hong Kong First Division.

Club	Founded	Position of Last Season (Before Cancellation)
Southern	2002	1st
Kitchee	1931	2nd
Lee Man	2017	3rd
Eastern	1932	4th
Rangers	1958	5th
HKFC	1886	6th
HK U23	2021	7th
Resources Capital	1982	8th
Tai Po	2002	1st in First Division
Sham Shui Po	2002	6th in First Division

- Yellow denotes a newly promoted club entering the league this year.

=== Stadia and locations ===
Locations of the 2022–23 Hong Kong Premier League clubs

Primary venues used in the Hong Kong Premier League:

Kitchee Eastern	Sham Shui Po	Lee Man HK U23	Tai Po
Mong Kok Stadium	Sham Shui Po Sports Ground	Tseung Kwan O Sports Ground	Tai Po Sports Ground
Capacity: 6,664	Capacity: 2,194	Capacity: 3,500	Capacity: 3,200
Resources Capital	HKFC	Southern	Rangers
Tsing Yi Sports Ground	HKFC Stadium	Aberdeen Sports Ground	Hammer Hill Road Sports Ground
Capacity: 1,500	Capacity: 2,750	Capacity: 9,000	Capacity: 2,200

=== Personnel and kits ===
Team	Chairman	Head coach	Captain	Kit manufacturer	Shirt sponsor
Kitchee	Ken Ng	(Hong Kong) Chu Chi Kwong	(Hong Kong) Huang Yang	(United States) Nike	EDPS Systems Ltd.
Lee Man	Norman Lee	(Hong Kong) Tsang Chiu Tat	(Hong Kong) Fernando Recio	(Germany) Adidas	Lee & Man Chemical
Rangers	Peter Mok	(Hong Kong) Chiu Chung Man (Hong Kong) Wong Chin Hung (Hong Kong) Lai Ka Fai (Hong Kong) Poon Man Chun	(Hong Kong) Lam Ka Wai	(China) UCAN	Biu Chun Watch Hands & Parts Manufacturers Ltd.
Southern	Matthew Wong	(Hong Kong) Cheng Siu Chung	(Japan) Shu Sasaki	(Italy) Macron	MAN SE
Resources Capital	Hanson Wong	(Spain) Joan Esteva	(Hong Kong) Cheng King Ho	FPCM	Kai Bo Food Supermarket
HKFC	(England) Tony Sealy	(Hong Kong) Tony Hamilton-Bram	(Netherlands) Freek Schipper	(Germany) Adidas	The Executive Centre
HK U23	Eric Fok	(Hong Kong) Szeto Man Chun	(Hong Kong) Wong Ho Yin	MC Sportswear	Key Connect
Tai Po	Lam Yick Kuen	(Hong Kong) Li Hang Wui	(Hong Kong) Chan Hiu Fung	(Spain) Joma	Wofoo Social Enterprises Limited
Eastern	Cheng Kai Ming	(Hong Kong) Roberto Losada	(Hong Kong) Leung Chun Pong	(Germany) Adidas	Upbest Group
Sham Shui Po	Lo Wing Man	(Hong Kong) Kwok Kar Lok	(Hong Kong) Lo Kong Wai (Hong Kong) Wo Chi Ming	Atacar	Sportshouse

=== Managerial changes ===
Team	Outgoing manager	Manner of departure	Date of vacancy	Position in table	Incoming manager	Date of appointment
Southern	(Pakistan) Zesh Rehman	Mutual Consent	5 March 2022	Pre-season	(Hong Kong) Cheng Siu Chung	14 June 2022
Resources Capital	(Spain) Joan Esteva	Signed by United City	3 June 2022	Pre-season	(Hong Kong) Tang Kwun Yin	11 August 2022
Tai Po	(Hong Kong) Chan Yuk Chi	Change of Role	10 July 2022	Pre-season	(Hong Kong) Li Hang Wui	10 July 2022
Sham Shui Po	(Hong Kong) Ko Chun Kay	Change of Role	11 July 2022	Pre-season	(Hong Kong) Poon Man Tik	11 July 2022
HK U23	(Hong Kong) Cheung Kin Fung	Mutual Consent	31 July 2022	Pre-season	(Hong Kong) Szeto Man Chun	2 August 2022
Sham Shui Po	(Hong Kong) Poon Man Tik	Resigned	1 October 2022	10th	(Hong Kong) Kwok Kar Lok	3 October 2022
Resources Capital	(Hong Kong) Tang Kwun Yin	Resigned	19 October 2022	6th	(Spain) Joan Esteva	4 November 2022
Lee Man	(Hong Kong) Chan Hiu Ming	Sacked	5 February 2023	2nd	(Hong Kong) Tsang Chiu Tat	5 February 2023

=== Foreign players ===
The number of foreign players teams can register is unlimited, with no more than 6 in the match squad and no more than 5 on the pitch during matches.

Club	Player 1	Player 2	Player 3	Player 4	Player 5	Player 6	Player 7	Player 8	Player 9	Former/Unregistered Players
Kitchee	(Brazil) Cleiton	(Brazil) Mikael	(Brazil) Igor Sartori	(China) Enikar Mehmud	(England) Charlie Scott	(Kyrgyzstan) Bekzhan Sagynbaev	(Montenegro) Dejan Damjanović	(South Korea) Kim Shin-wook	(Turkmenistan) Ruslan Mingazow	(Greece) Michalis Manias (Spain) Raúl Baena
Lee Man	(Argentina) Jonathan Acosta	(Brazil) Everton	(Brazil) Gil	(Japan) Ryoya Tachibana	(Sierra Leone) Alie Sesay	(Spain) José Ángel	(Spain) Manolo Bleda	(Spain) Manuel Gavilán		
Southern	(Brazil) Dudu	(Brazil) Kessi	(Brazil) Jean Moser	(Brazil) Stefan Pereira	(Japan) Kota Kawase	(Japan) Shu Sasaki				
Rangers	(Brazil) Juninho	(Brazil) Fernando Lopes	(China) Yang Bailin	(Ghana) Nassam Ibrahim	(Japan) Ryota Hayashi	(Japan) Yumemi Kanda	(South Korea) Kim Min-kyu	(South Korea) Park Jong-bum		(Brazil) David Bala (Brazil) Cássio (Brazil) Augusto Neto (Turkey) Kaan Gül
Resources Capital	(Argentina) Ricardo Sendra	(Brazil) Felipe Sá	(England) Benjamin Tandy Ortega	(Nicaragua) Pablo Gállego	(Nigeria) Robert Odu	(Spain) Albert Canal	(Spain) Carles Tena			
Tai Po	(Brazil) Gabriel Cividini	(Brazil) João Emir	(Brazil) Luizinho	(Brazil) Paulinho Simionato						
Eastern	(China) João Gil	(Chinese Taipei) Emilio Estevez	(Kyrgyzstan) Tamirlan Kozubayev	(Spain) Marcos Gondra	(Spain) Víctor Bertomeu	(Turkey) Kaan Gül				
Sham Shui Po	(Chile) Nicholas Benavides	(China) Chen Hao	(Mongolia) Oyuntuya Oyunbold	(Nepal) Sanzio Limbu	(South Korea) Kwon Jae-kyeong	(South Korea) Sim Woon-sub	(Spain) Jesús González	(Ukraine) Oleksii Shliakotin		(Brazil) Thiago Silva (Pakistan) Shahwaiz Khan

There are no restrictions on the number of foreign players that HKFC can register. However, the team must have at least nine Hong Kong players in the squad, with no less than three on the pitch during matches.

Club	HK Player 1	HK Player 2	HK Player 3	HK Player 4	HK Player 5	HK Player 6	HK Player 7
HKFC	(Hong Kong) Timothy Chow	(Hong Kong) Alexandre Dujardin	(Hong Kong) Fung Long Hin	(Hong Kong) Ng Tsz Chung	(Hong Kong) Paul Ngue	(Hong Kong) Paulinho	(Hong Kong) Jack Sealy
HKFC	HK Player 8	HK Player 9	HK Player 10	HK Player 11	HK Player 12	HK Player 13	
HKFC	(Hong Kong) Siu Ka Ming	(Hong Kong) Emmet Wan	(Hong Kong) Wong Sheung Choi	(Hong Kong) Yue Yixing	(Netherlands) Freek Schipper	(Scotland) Robert Scott	

HK U23 is not allowed to register any foreign players. Meanwhile, the number of overaged players is restricted to five for the team, with no more than three on the pitch during matches. The rest of the players must meet the registration status of U23 local players.

Club	Overaged Player 1	Overaged Player 2	Overaged Player 3	Overaged Player 4	Overaged Player 5
HK U23	(Hong Kong) Cheung Chun Hin	(Hong Kong) Kwok Tsz Kaai	(Hong Kong) Law Hiu Chung	(Hong Kong) Wong Ho Yin	(Hong Kong) Yuen Sai Kit

== League table ==
Pos	Team	Pld	W	D	L	GF	GA	GD	Pts	Qualification or relegation
1	Kitchee (C)	18	15	1	2	76	7	+69	46	Qualification for AFC Champions League group stage
2	Lee Man	18	14	2	2	50	13	+37	44	Qualification for AFC Champions League qualifying play-offs (Note: Since the winners of the 2022–23 Hong Kong FA Cup, Kitchee, qualified for the Champions League group stage, the Champions League qualifying play-offs berth given to the Hong Kong FA Cup winners was passed to the third-placed team.)
3	Rangers	18	10	3	5	41	16	+25	33	Qualification for AFC Champions League qualifying play-offs
4	Eastern	18	9	4	5	32	13	+19	31 (Note: Head-to-head points: Eastern 3, Southern 3. Head-to-head goals: Eastern 2, Southern 2 Goal differences: Eastern +19, Southern -1.)	
5	Southern	18	10	1	7	24	25	−1	31	
6	HKFC	18	7	5	6	18	22	−4	26	
7	Tai Po	18	5	5	8	20	27	−7	20	
8	Resources Capital	18	5	3	10	15	34	−19	18	
9	Sham Shui Po	18	2	1	15	4	62	−58	7	
10	HK U23	18	0	1	17	6	67	−61	1	

Updated to match(es) played on unknown. Source: Hong Kong Football Association
Rules for classification: 1) Points; 2) Head-to-head points; 3) Head-to-head goal difference; 4) Head-to-head goals scored; 5) Goal difference; 6) Goals scored; 7) Fair-play points; 8) Drawing lots (Play-off if the winner has to be decided).
(C) Champions

== Results ==
Home \ Away	KIT	TPF	LEE	RAN	RES	SOU	HKF	U23	EAS	SSP
Kitchee	—	4–0	2–2	2–1	2–0	7–0	5–0	8–0	3–0	7–0
Tai Po	2–1	—	0–3	1–5	1–2	2–0	1–2	2–1	1–2	0–0
Lee Man	2–1	2–0	—	2–1	3–1	1–3	2–1	10–0	1–1	4–0
Rangers	0–2	1–1	1–0	—	4–1	1–0	0–1	3–0	2–2	4–0
Resources Capital	0–5	0–0	0–4	1–3	—	0–1	1–1	1–0	0–3	2–1
Southern	0–5	3–1	0–2	2–1	1–0	—	0–0	2–0	1–2	3–0
HKFC	0–3	1–1	1–2	1–2	1–1	2–1	—	2–1	1–0	2–0
HK U23	0–7	0–3	1–5	0–5	0–3	1–3	1–1	—	0–5	1–2
Eastern	0–2	0–0	0–1	0–0	4–0	0–1	1–0	4–0	—	4–0
Sham Shui Po	0–10	0–4	0–4	0–7	0–2	0–3	0–1	1–0	0–4	—

Updated to match(es) played on unknown. Source: HKFA
Legend: Blue = home team win; Yellow = draw; Red = away team win.

== Positions by round ==
To preserve chronological evolvements, any postponed matches are not included to the round at which they were originally scheduled, but added to the full round they were played immediately afterwards. For example, if a match is scheduled for round 7, but then played between rounds 8 and 9, it will be added to the standings for round 8.

Team ╲ Round	1	2	3	4	5	6	7	8	9	10	11	12	13	14	15	16	17	18
Kitchee	6	7	2	6	2	2	2	2	2	1	1	1	1	1	1	1	1	1
Eastern	3	5	5	3	5	6	7	4	5	5	5	5	5	6	6	5	5	4
Lee Man	2	4	4	1	1	1	1	1	1	2	2	2	2	2	2	2	2	2
Southern	1	1	3	4	6	4	4	3	3	3	3	3	3	3	3	3	3	5
Rangers	9	8	8	8	8	7	6	6	6	6	6	6	6	5	4	4	4	3
Resources Capital	7	2	6	5	3	5	6	7	7	7	7	7	7	7	8	8	8	8
HKFC	5	3	1	2	4	3	3	5	4	4	4	4	4	4	5	6	6	6
HK U23	10	10	9	9	10	9	10	10	10	10	10	10	10	10	10	10	10	10
Tai Po	4	6	7	7	7	8	8	8	8	8	8	8	8	8	7	7	7	7
Sham Shui Po	8	9	10	10	9	10	9	9	9	9	9	9	9	9	9	9	9	9

Leader - 2023–24 AFC Champions League
Runner-up - 2023–24 AFC Champions League qualifying play-offs

Source: Hong Kong Football Association website

== Fixtures and results ==
=== Round 1 ===
27 August 2022	Southern	2–0	HK U23	Aberdeen, Hong Kong
15:00 (UTC+8)	Pereira 12' (pen.); Lee Ka Yiu 59'	Report		Stadium: Aberdeen Sports Ground; Attendance: 864; Referee: Ho Wai Sing

27 August 2022	Eastern	0–0	Tai Po	Mong Kok, Kowloon
18:00 (UTC+8)		Report		Stadium: Mong Kok Stadium; Attendance: 2,448; Referee: Lau Fong Hei

28 August 2022	Lee Man	2–1	Rangers	Tseung Kwan O, New Territories
15:00 (UTC+8)	Everton 16', 80'	Report	Juninho 41'	Stadium: Tseung Kwan O Sports Ground; Attendance: 1,515; Referee: Tam Ping Wun

18 September 2022	Sham Shui Po	0–10	Kitchee	Sham Shui Po, Kowloon
15:00 (UTC+8)		Report	Poon Pui Hin 3', 8'; Scott 39' (pen.), 49'; Law Tsz Chun 55'; Mingazov 74'; Damjanović 75', 79'; Cheng Chin Lung 78'; Mikael 83'	Stadium: Sham Shui Po Sports Ground; Attendance: 1,450; Referee: Tang Hing Fu

18 September 2022	Resources Capital	1–1	HKFC	Tsing Yi, New Territories
18:00 (UTC+8)	Sá 73'	Report	Sahaghian 37'	Stadium: Tsing Yi Sports Ground; Attendance: 568; Referee: Tam Ping Wun

=== Round 2 ===
3 September 2022	Tai Po	1–2	Resources Capital	Tai Po, New Territories
15:00 (UTC+8)	Cheng Tsz Sum 50'	Report	Wong Wai Kwok 46'; Sá 56'	Stadium: Tai Po Sports Ground; Attendance: 958; Referee: Poon Chun Kit

3 September 2022	Lee Man	1–3	Southern	Tseung Kwan O, New Territories
18:00 (UTC+8)	Everton 45+1'	Report	Sasaki 47', 89' (pen.); Dudu 77'	Stadium: Tseung Kwan O Sports Ground; Attendance: 1,133; Referee: Wong Wai Lun

4 September 2022	Sham Shui Po	0–1	HKFC	Sham Shui Po, Kowloon
15:00 (UTC+8)		Report	Ngue 25' (pen.)	Stadium: Sham Shui Po Sports Ground; Attendance: 940; Referee: Liu Kwok Man

6 November 2022	Rangers	0–2	Kitchee	Diamond Hill, Kowloon
15:00 (UTC+8)		Report	Mingazov 57'; Manias 90+2'	Stadium: Hammer Hill Road Sports Ground; Attendance: 699; Referee: Tang Hing Fu

4 December 2022	HK U23	0–5	Eastern	Tseung Kwan O, New Territories
15:00 (UTC+8)		Report	Bertomeu 9'; Wong Ho Chun 29'; Jojo 32'; Cheung Chun Hin 33' (o.g.); Wu Chun Ming 48'	Stadium: Tseung Kwan O Sports Ground; Attendance: 288; Referee: Law Bik Chi

=== Round 3 ===
15 October 2022	Lee Man	10–0	HK U23	Tseung Kwan O, New Territories
15:00 (UTC+8)	Tachibana 6'; Gil 25', 30'; Bleda 27', 38', 40', 47', 58'; Lee Hong Lim 73'; Gavilán 75'	Report		Stadium: Tseung Kwan O Sports Ground; Attendance: 413; Referee: Lau Fong Hei

15 October 2022	Kitchee	7–0	Southern	Mong Kok, Kowloon
18:00 (UTC+8)	Cleiton 10'; Poon Pui Hin 12'; Mingazow 35', 51', 82'; Fernando 45+4'; Manias 84'	Report		Stadium: Mong Kok Stadium; Attendance: 2,245; Referee: Ho Wai Sing

16 October 2022	Sham Shui Po	0–4	Tai Po	Sham Shui Po, Kowloon
15:00 (UTC+8)		Report	Dujardin 9' (o.g.); Khan 66'; Chan Hiu Fung 75'; Paulinho 78'	Stadium: Sham Shui Po Sports Ground; Attendance: 868; Referee: Tang Hing Fu

16 October 2022	Rangers	0–1	HKFC	Diamond Hill, Kowloon
15:00 (UTC+8)		Report	Maciel 70'	Stadium: Hammer Hill Road Sports Ground; Attendance: 338; Referee: Woo Chun Sing

16 October 2022	Eastern	4–0	Resources Capital	Mong Kok, Kowloon
18:00 (UTC+8)	Gondra 21', 45+4'; Wu Chun Ming 33'; Kozubayev 45'	Report		Stadium: Mong Kok Stadium; Attendance: 751; Referee: Yu Kin Fung

=== Round 4 ===
29 October 2022	Eastern	4–0	Sham Shui Po	Mong Kok, Kowloon
15:00 (UTC+8)	Sun Ming Him 27', 33'; Estevez 50'; Gil 88'	Report		Stadium: Mong Kok Stadium; Attendance: 611; Referee: Yu Kin Fung

29 October 2022	Lee Man	2–1	Kitchee	Tseung Kwan O, New Territories
18:00 (UTC+8)	Everton 18'; Diego 44'	Report	Hélio 75'	Stadium: Tseung Kwan O Sports Ground; Attendance: 2,021; Referee: Wong Wai Lun

30 October 2022	Southern	0–0	HKFC	Aberdeen, Hong Kong
15:00 (UTC+8)		Report		Stadium: Aberdeen Sports Ground; Attendance: 365; Referee: Tam Ping Wun

30 October 2022	Rangers	1–1	Tai Po	Diamond Hill, Kowloon
15:00 (UTC+8)	Kim Min-kyu 45+3'	Report	Paulinho 90+3'	Stadium: Hammer Hill Road Sports Ground; Attendance: 530; Referee: Ho Wai Sing

30 October 2022	HK U23	0–3	Resources Capital	Tseung Kwan O, New Territories
18:00 (UTC+8)		Report	Sá 13', 76', 88'	Stadium: Tseung Kwan O Sports Ground; Attendance: 281; Referee: Tang Hing Fu

=== Round 5 ===
12 November 2022	Resources Capital	2–1	Sham Shui Po	Tsing Yi, New Territories
15:00 (UTC+8)	Wong Wai Kwok 20'; Yip Cheuk Man 60'	Report	Benavides 67'	Stadium: Tsing Yi Sports Ground; Attendance: 433; Referee: Tam Ping Wun

12 November 2022	HK U23	0–7	Kitchee	Tseung Kwan O, New Territories
18:00 (UTC+8)		Report	Benhaddouche 45+2'; Damjanović 53', 57', 59'; Mikael 55', 75'; Mingazov 76'	Stadium: Tseung Kwan O Sports Ground; Attendance: 392; Referee: Law Bik Chi

13 November 2022	HKFC	1–2	Lee Man	Happy Valley, Hong Kong Island
16:30 (UTC+8)	Wong Sheung Choi 48'	Report	Gavilán 82'; Chang Hei Yin 90+5'	Stadium: Hong Kong Football Club Stadium; Attendance: 1,194; Referee: Poon Chun Kit

13 November 2022	Eastern	0–0	Rangers	Mong Kok, Kowloon
18:00 (UTC+8)		Report		Stadium: Mong Kok Stadium; Attendance: 754; Referee: Liu Kwok Man

3 December 2022	Southern	3–1	Tai Po	Aberdeen, Hong Kong
15:00 (UTC+8)	Pereira 9', 16'; Lee Ka Yiu 12'	Report	Luizinho 66'	Stadium: Aberdeen Sports Ground; Attendance: 301; Referee: Lau Fong Hei

=== Round 6 ===
19 November 2022	Resources Capital	0–1	Southern	Tsing Yi, New Territories
15:00 (UTC+8)		Report	Ju Yingzhi 38'	Stadium: Tsing Yi Sports Ground; Attendance: 458; Referee: Ho Wai Sing

19 November 2022	Eastern	0–1	Lee Man	Mong Kok, Kowloon
18:00 (UTC+8)		Report	Gavilán 26'	Stadium: Mong Kok Stadium; Attendance: 1,380; Referee: Lau Fong Hei

20 November 2022	Rangers	4–0	Sham Shui Po	Diamond Hill, Kowloon
15:00 (UTC+8)	Gül 25'; Yiu Ho Ming 33' (pen.); Yu Joy Yin 55'; Juninho 59'	Report		Stadium: Hammer Hill Road Sports Ground; Attendance: 362; Referee: Wong Wai Lun

20 November 2022	HKFC	2–1	HK U23	Happy Valley, Hong Kong Island
16:30 (UTC+8)	Siu Ka Ming 8'; Léo 90+2'	Report	Leung Wai Fung 19'	Stadium: Hong Kong Football Club Stadium; Attendance: 595; Referee: Tang Hing Fu

20 November 2022	Kitchee	4–0	Tai Po	Mong Kok, Kowloon
18:00 (UTC+8)	Mingazov 19'; Cleiton 53'; Roberto 60'; Fung Kwun Ming 81' (o.g.)	Report		Stadium: Mong Kok Stadium; Attendance: 982; Referee: Tam Ping Wun

=== Round 7 ===
26 November 2022	Southern	3–0	Sham Shui Po	Aberdeen, Hong Kong
15:00 (UTC+8)	Pereira 9', 66', 80'	Report		Stadium: Aberdeen Sports Ground; Attendance: 269; Referee: Tam Ping Wun

26 November 2022	HK U23	0–5	Rangers	Tseung Kwan O, New Territories
15:00 (UTC+8)		Report	Cássio 16'; Juninho 42'; Hayashi 53'; Lo Kwan Yee 56'; Kim Min-kyu 69'	Stadium: Tseung Kwan O Sports Ground; Attendance: 172; Referee: Liu Kwok Man

26 November 2022	Kitchee	3–0	Eastern	Mong Kok, Kowloon
18:00 (UTC+8)	Mingazov 54', 90+2'; Poon Pui Hin 90+4'	Report		Stadium: Mong Kok Stadium; Attendance: 1,493; Referee: Ho Wai Sing

27 November 2022	Tai Po	1–2	HKFC	Tai Po, New Territories
15:00 (UTC+8)	Cividini 56'	Report	Schipper 5'; Dujardin 16'	Stadium: Tai Po Sports Ground; Attendance: 481; Referee: Luk Kin Sun

27 November 2022	Lee Man	3–1	Resources Capital	Tseung Kwan O, New Territories
18:00 (UTC+8)	Chang Hei Yin 20'; Gavilán 61'; Cheng Siu Kwan 64'	Report	Wong Wai Kwok 90+2'	Stadium: Tseung Kwan O Sports Ground; Attendance: 358; Referee: Woo Chun Sing

=== Round 8 ===
14 January 2023	Southern	1–2	Eastern	Aberdeen, Hong Kong
15:00 (UTC+8)	Sasaki 37' (pen.)	Report	Sun Ming Him 8'; Wong Ho Chun 18'	Stadium: Aberdeen Sports Ground; Attendance: 395; Referee: Tam Ping Wun

14 January 2023	HK U23	1–2	Sham Shui Po	Tseung Kwan O, New Territories
15:00 (UTC+8)	Law Hiu Chung 90+1' (pen.)	Report	Singh 23'; Dujardin 58'	Stadium: Tseung Kwan O Sports Ground; Attendance: 420; Referee: Yu Kin Fung

14 January 2023	Kitchee	5–0	HKFC	Mong Kok, Kowloon
18:00 (UTC+8)	Damjanović 15', 44'; Cleiton 31'; Roberto 47'; Mikael 89'	Report		Stadium: Mong Kok Stadium; Attendance: 768; Referee: Ho Wai Sing

15 January 2023	Rangers	4–1	Resources Capital	Diamond Hill, Kowloon
15:00 (UTC+8)	Kanda 9', 80' (pen.); Lau Chi Lok 47'; Lo Kwan Yee 87'	Report	Sá 40'	Stadium: Hammer Hill Road Sports Ground; Attendance: 376; Referee: Wong Wai Lun

15 January 2023	Lee Man	2–0	Tai Po	Tseung Kwan O, New Territories
18:00 (UTC+8)	Everton 53' (pen.); Nakamura 59'	Report		Stadium: Tseung Kwan O Sports Ground; Attendance: 375; Referee: Luk Kin Sun

=== Round 9 ===
28 January 2023	Southern	2–1	Rangers	Aberdeen, Hong Kong
15:00 (UTC+8)	Pereira 28'; Khan 40'	Report	Hayashi 33'	Stadium: Aberdeen Sports Ground; Attendance: 449; Referee: Lau Fong Hei

28 January 2023	Resources Capital	0–5	Kitchee	Tsing Yi, New Territories
18:00 (UTC+8)		Report	Yeung Hin Lok 1' (o.g.); Damjanović 10', 12'; Ngan Cheuk Pan 34'; Lau Kwan Ching 69' (o.g.)	Stadium: Tsing Yi Sports Ground; Attendance: 518; Referee: Tam Ping Wun

29 January 2023	Sham Shui Po	0–4	Lee Man	Sham Shui Po, Kowloon
15:00 (UTC+8)		Report	Tachibana 37'; Gil 45+2'; Chang Hei Yin 54'; Everton 89'	Stadium: Sham Shui Po Sports Ground; Attendance: 657; Referee: Poon Chun Kit

29 January 2023	HKFC	1–0	Eastern	Happy Valley, Hong Kong Island
16:30 (UTC+8)	Paulinho 37'	Report		Stadium: Hong Kong Football Club Stadium; Attendance: 843; Referee: Luk Kin Sun

29 January 2023	HK U23	0–3	Tai Po	Tseung Kwan O, New Territories
18:00 (UTC+8)		Report	Paulinho 45+2', 78'; Chan Hiu Fung 84'	Stadium: Tseung Kwan O Sports Ground; Attendance: 185; Referee: Tang Hing Fu

=== Round 10 ===
4 February 2023	Tai Po	1–2	Eastern	Tai Po, New Territories
15:00 (UTC+8)	Paulinho 72'	Report	Bertomeu 34'; Sun Ming Him 66'	Stadium: Tai Po Sports Ground; Attendance: 690; Referee: Yu Kin Fung

4 February 2023	HK U23	1–3	Southern	Tseung Kwan O, New Territories
18:00 (UTC+8)	Lam Chi Fung 7'	Report	Pereira 2', 5', 50'	Stadium: Tseung Kwan O Sports Ground; Attendance: 316; Referee: Wong Po Sing

5 February 2023	Rangers	1–0	Lee Man	Diamond Hill, Kowloon
15:00 (UTC+8)	Juninho 37'	Report		Stadium: Hammer Hill Road Sports Ground; Attendance: 494; Referee: Tam Ping Wun

5 February 2023	HKFC	1–1	Resources Capital	Happy Valley, Hong Kong Island
16:30 (UTC+8)	Toomer 90+6'	Report	Yip Cheuk Man 68'	Stadium: Hong Kong Football Club Stadium; Attendance: 611; Referee: Ho Wai Sing

5 February 2023	Kitchee	7–0	Sham Shui Po	Mong Kok, Kowloon
18:00 (UTC+8)	Damjanović 6', 9'; Mingazov 13'; Sartori 28'; Mikael 45'; Fernando 71'; Sagynbayev 79'	Report		Stadium: Mong Kok Stadium; Attendance: 717; Referee: Law Bik Chi

=== Round 11 ===
11 February 2023	Tai Po	2–0	Southern	Tai Po, New Territories
15:00 (UTC+8)	Chan Hiu Fung 27'; Luizinho 73'	Report		Stadium: Tai Po Sports Ground; Attendance: 549; Referee: Liu Kwok Man

11 February 2023	Lee Man	2–1	HKFC	Tseung Kwan O, New Territories
18:00 (UTC+8)	Everton 15', 68'	Report	Yu Wai Lim 90+2' (o.g.)	Stadium: Tseung Kwan O Sports Ground; Attendance: 369; Referee: Poon Chun Kit

12 February 2023	Sham Shui Po	0–2	Resources Capital	Sham Shui Po, Kowloon
15:00 (UTC+8)		Report	Wong Wai Kwok 67'; Sá 74'	Stadium: Sham Shui Po Sports Ground; Attendance: 572; Referee: Tam Ping Wun

12 February 2023	Rangers	2–2	Eastern	Diamond Hill, Kowloon
15:00 (UTC+8)	Kanda 36', 88'	Report	Park Jong-bum 12' (o.g.); Bertomeu 18'	Stadium: Hammer Hill Road Sports Ground; Attendance: 602; Referee: Luk Kin Sun

12 February 2023	Kitchee	8–0	HK U23	Mong Kok, Kowloon
18:00 (UTC+8)	Fernando 27'; Damjanović 31' (pen.), 33'; Mikael 55'; Sartori 61', 76'; Mingazov 88' (pen.); Ngan Cheuk Pan 90+1'	Report		Stadium: Mong Kok Stadium; Attendance: 636; Referee: Tang Hing Fu

=== Round 12 ===
18 February 2023	Southern	0–2	Lee Man	Aberdeen, Hong Kong
15:00 (UTC+8)		Report	Bleda 63'; Everton 76'	Stadium: Aberdeen Sports Ground; Attendance: 499; Referee: Tam Ping Wun

18 February 2023	Kitchee	2–1	Rangers	Mong Kok, Kowloon
18:00 (UTC+8)	Mingazov 38'; Damjanović 90+3' (pen.)	Report	Yu Joy Yin 55'	Stadium: Mong Kok Stadium; Attendance: 1,325; Referee: Lau Fong Hei

19 February 2023	Resources Capital	0–0	Tai Po	Tsing Yi, New Territories
15:00 (UTC+8)		Report		Stadium: Tsing Yi Sports Ground; Attendance: 331; Referee: Ho Wai Sing

19 February 2023	HKFC	2–0	Sham Shui Po	Happy Valley, Hong Kong Island
16:30 (UTC+8)	Scott 22'; Paulinho 24'	Report		Stadium: Hong Kong Football Club Stadium; Attendance: 560; Referee: Woo Chun Sing

19 February 2023	Eastern	4–0	HK U23	Mong Kok, Kowloon
18:00 (UTC+8)	Bertomeu 48', 50'; Swainston 52'; Sun Ming Him 61'	Report		Stadium: Mong Kok Stadium; Attendance: 345; Referee: Luk Kin Sun

=== Round 13 ===
25 February 2023	Tai Po	0–3	Lee Man	Tai Po, New Territories
15:00 (UTC+8)		Report	Gil 16'; Everton 29', 39'	Stadium: Tai Po Sports Ground; Attendance: 574; Referee: Yu Kin Fung

25 February 2023	Eastern	0–1	Southern	Mong Kok, Kowloon
18:00 (UTC+8)		Report	Pereira 77'	Stadium: Mong Kok Stadium; Attendance: 907; Referee: Liu Kwok Man

26 February 2023	Sham Shui Po	1–0	HK U23	Sham Shui Po, Kowloon
15:00 (UTC+8)	Chu Wai Kwan 6'	Report		Stadium: Sham Shui Po Sports Ground; Attendance: 711; Referee: Wong Wai Lun

26 February 2023	HKFC	0–3	Kitchee	Happy Valley, Hong Kong Island
16:30 (UTC+8)		Report	Damjanović 25'; Mingazov 74', 84'	Stadium: Hong Kong Football Club Stadium; Attendance: 1,720; Referee: Ho Wai Sing

26 February 2023	Resources Capital	1–3	Rangers	Tsing Yi, New Territories
18:00 (UTC+8)	Gállego 33'	Report	Kanda 8', 63' (pen.); Yu Joy Yin 86'	Stadium: Tsing Yi Sports Ground; Attendance: 392; Referee: Luk Kin Sun

=== Round 14 ===
11 March 2023	Rangers	3–0	HK U23	Diamond Hill, Kowloon
15:00 (UTC+8)	Lau Chi Lok 11'; Juninho 13'; Chan Yiu Cho 79'	Report		Stadium: Hammer Hill Road Sports Ground; Attendance: 302; Referee: Yu Kin Fung

11 March 2023	Eastern	0–2	Kitchee	Mong Kok, Kowloon
18:00 (UTC+8)		Report	Damjanović 26', 57'	Stadium: Mong Kok Stadium; Attendance: 1,811; Referee: Luk Kin Sun

12 March 2023	Sham Shui Po	0–3	Southern	Sham Shui Po, Kowloon
15:00 (UTC+8)		Report	Tomas 47'; Pereira 74', 90+1'	Stadium: Sham Shui Po Sports Ground; Attendance: 626; Referee: Tang Hing Fu

12 March 2023	HKFC	1–1	Tai Po	Happy Valley, Hong Kong Island
16:30 (UTC+8)	Thiago 61'	Report	Chan Hiu Fung 45+3'	Stadium: Hong Kong Football Club Stadium; Attendance: 605; Referee: Liu Kwok Man

12 March 2023	Resources Capital	0–4	Lee Man	Tsing Yi, New Territories
18:00 (UTC+8)		Report	Gil 63', 75'; Everton 67' (pen.); Tsui Wang Kit 90+6'	Stadium: Tsing Yi Sports Ground; Attendance: 329; Referee: Ho Wai Sing

=== Round 15 ===
18 March 2023	Southern	1–0	Resources Capital	Aberdeen, Hong Kong
15:00 (UTC+8)	Awal 74'	Report		Stadium: Aberdeen Sports Ground; Attendance: 272; Referee: Woo Chun Sing

18 March 2023	Lee Man	1–1	Eastern	Tseung Kwan O, New Territories
18:00 (UTC+8)	Tsui Wang Kit 45'	Report	Ma Hei Wai 77'	Stadium: Tseung Kwan O Sports Ground; Attendance: 745; Referee: Lau Fong Hei

19 March 2023	Sham Shui Po	0–7	Rangers	Sham Shui Po, Kowloon
15:00 (UTC+8)		Report	Juninho 24'; Lau Chi Lok 45'; Hayashi 45+3'; Kilama 49'; Fernando 57'; Ibrahim 72', 90'	Stadium: Sham Shui Po Sports Ground; Attendance: 591; Referee: Luk Kin Sun

19 March 2023	Tai Po	2–1	Kitchee	Tai Po, New Territories
15:00 (UTC+8)	Paulinho 18', 60'	Report	Mingazov 67'	Stadium: Tai Po Sports Ground; Attendance: 799; Referee: Ho Wai Sing

19 March 2023	HK U23	1–1	HKFC	Tseung Kwan O, New Territories
18:00 (UTC+8)	Lau Ka Kiu 90+1'	Report	Thiago 47'	Stadium: Tseung Kwan O Sports Ground; Attendance: 135; Referee: Tam Ping Wun

=== Round 16 ===
15 April 2023	Southern	0–5	Kitchee	Aberdeen, Hong Kong
15:00 (UTC+8)		Report	Mingazov 2', 89'; Scott 6'; Poon Pui Hin 25'; Mikael 69'	Stadium: Aberdeen Sports Ground; Attendance: 1,101; Referee: Yu Kin Fung

15 April 2023	HK U23	1–5	Lee Man	Tseung Kwan O, New Territories
18:00 (UTC+8)	Lee Lok Him 82'	Report	Wong Wai 15'; Gil 31'; Everton 67' (pen.), 77', 78'	Stadium: Tseung Kwan O Sports Ground; Attendance: 283; Referee: Woo Chun Sing

16 April 2023	Tai Po	0–0	Sham Shui Po	Tai Po, New Territories
15:00 (UTC+8)		Report		Stadium: Tai Po Sports Ground; Attendance: 422; Referee: Tang Hing Fu

16 April 2023	HKFC	1–2	Rangers	Happy Valley, Hong Kong Island
16:30 (UTC+8)	Thiago 32'	Report	Juninho 14'; Kim Min-kyu 63'	Stadium: Hong Kong Football Club Stadium; Attendance: 732; Referee: Tam Ping Wun

16 April 2023	Resources Capital	0–3	Eastern	Tsing Yi, New Territories
18:00 (UTC+8)		Report	Bertomeu 30', 62'; Kozubayev 56'	Stadium: Tsing Yi Sports Ground; Attendance: 265; Referee: Law Bik Chi

=== Round 17 ===
22 April 2023	Rangers	1–0	Southern	Diamond Hill, Kowloon
15:00 (UTC+8)	Kim Min-kyu 68'	Report		Stadium: Hammer Hill Road Sports Ground; Attendance: 493; Referee: Yu Kin Fung

22 April 2023	Kitchee	2–0	Resources Capital	Mong Kok, Kowloon
18:00 (UTC+8)	Cleiton 7'; Mikael 34'	Report		Stadium: Mong Kok Stadium; Attendance: 712; Referee: Tam Ping Wun

23 April 2023	Tai Po	2–1	HK U23	Tai Po, New Territories
15:00 (UTC+8)	Paulinho 13' (pen.); Khan 47'	Report	Wong Ho Yin 81'	Stadium: Tai Po Sports Ground; Attendance: 333; Referee: Law Bik Chi

23 April 2023	Lee Man	4–0	Sham Shui Po	Tseung Kwan O, New Territories
15:00 (UTC+8)	Everton 51'; Ángel 53'; Acosta 74'; Gil 85'	Report		Stadium: Tseung Kwan O Sports Ground; Attendance: 428; Referee: Liu Kwok Man

23 April 2023	Eastern	1–0	HKFC	Mong Kok, Kowloon
18:00 (UTC+8)	Sun Ming Him 33'	Report		Stadium: Mong Kok Stadium; Attendance: 379; Referee: Woo Chun Sing

=== Round 18 ===
7 May 2023	Tai Po	1–5	Rangers	Tai Po, New Territories
15:00 (UTC+8)	Lee Ka Ho 67'	Report	Ibrahim 11', 54'; Kanda 22' (pen.); Lam Hok Hei 40'; Hayashi 64'	Stadium: Tai Po Sports Ground; Attendance: 454; Referee: Yu Kin Fung

7 May 2023	HKFC	2–1	Southern	Happy Valley, Hong Kong Island
15:00 (UTC+8)	Thiago 48'; Chow 89'	Report	Awal 90+6'	Stadium: Hong Kong Football Club Stadium; Attendance: 567; Referee: Ho Wai Sing

7 May 2023	Resources Capital	1–0	HK U23	Tsing Yi, New Territories
15:00 (UTC+8)	Chan Siu Kwan 24'	Report		Stadium: Tsing Yi Sports Ground; Attendance: 1,421; Referee: Law Bik Chi

7 May 2023	Kitchee	2–2	Lee Man	Mong Kok, Kowloon
18:00 (UTC+8)	Mikael 23' (pen.); Russell 76'	Report	Bleda 9'; Everton 73'	Stadium: Mong Kok Stadium; Attendance: 6,489; Referee: Tam Ping Wun

14 May 2023	Sham Shui Po	0–4	Eastern	Sham Shui Po, Kowloon
15:00 (UTC+8)		Report	Gil 7'; Kozubayev 29'; Sun Ming Him 76', 90+5' (pen.)	Stadium: Sham Shui Po Sports Ground; Attendance: 344; Referee: Tam Ping Wun

== Season statistics ==
=== Top scorers ===
Rank	Player	Club	Goals
1	(Montenegro) Dejan Damjanović	Kitchee	17
1	(Turkmenistan) Ruslan Mingazov	Kitchee	17
1	(Brazil) Everton Camargo	Lee Man	17
4	(Brazil) Stefan Pereira	Southern	13
5	(Brazil) Mikael	Kitchee	9
6	(Brazil) Paulinho Simionato	Tai Po	8
6	(Brazil) Gil	Lee Man	8
6	(Hong Kong) Sun Ming Him	Eastern	8
9	(Brazil) Felipe Sá	Resources Capital	7
9	(Brazil) Juninho	Rangers	7
9	(Japan) Yumemi Kanda	Rangers	7
9	(Spain) Víctor Bertomeu	Eastern	7
9	(Spain) Manolo Bleda	Lee Man	7

=== Hat-tricks ===
Note: The results column shows the scorer's team score first. Teams in bold are home teams.

#	Player	For	Against	Result	Date	Ref
1	(Spain) Manolo Bleda^{^{5}}	**Lee Man**	HK U23	10–0	15 October 2022	
2	(Turkmenistan) Ruslan Mingazow	**Kitchee**	Southern	7–0	15 October 2022	
3	(Brazil) Felipe Sá	Resources Capital	**HK U23**	3–0	30 October 2022	
4	(Montenegro) Dejan Damjanović	Kitchee	**HK U23**	7–0	12 November 2022	
5	(Brazil) Stefan Pereira	**Southern**	Sham Shui Po	3–0	26 November 2022	
6	(Brazil) Stefan Pereira	Southern	**HK U23**	3–1	4 February 2023	
7	(Brazil) Everton Camargo	Lee Man	**HK U23**	5–1	15 April 2023	

^{5} Player scored 5 goals

=== Clean sheets ===
Rank	Player	Club	Match(es)
1	(Hong Kong) Paulo César	Kitchee	13
2	(Hong Kong) Yapp Hung Fai	Eastern	9
3	(Hong Kong) Ng Wai Him	Southern	7
4	(Hong Kong) Chan Ka Ho	Lee Man	6
5	(England) Freddie Toomer	HKFC	5
5	(Hong Kong) Leung Hing Kit	Rangers	5
7	(Hong Kong) Li Hon Ho	Tai Po	3
7	(Hong Kong) Tse Ka Wing	Tai Po	3
7	(Hong Kong) Lam Chun Kit	Resources Capital	3
10	(Hong Kong) Yuen Ho Chun	Lee Man	2
10	(Hong Kong) Lo Siu Kei	Rangers	2

== Attendances ==
Pos	Team	Total	High	Low	Average	Change
1	Kitchee	15,367	6,489	636	1,707	−21.6%
2	Eastern	9,386	2,448	345	1,043	−0.9%
3	HKFC	7,427	1,720	560	825	+68.7%
4	Lee Man	7,357	2,021	358	817	−13.4%
5	Sham Shui Po	6,759	1,450	344	751	n/a^{1}
6	Tai Po	5,260	958	333	584	n/a^{1}
7	Resources Capital	4,715	1,421	265	524	+11.7%
8	Southern	4,515	1,101	269	502	+18.4%
9	Rangers	4,196	699	302	466	−56.7%
10	HK U23	2,472	420	135	275	+5.8%
	League total	67,454	6,489	135	749	−23.0%

Source: HKFA
Notes:
1: Team did not play in the Premier League last season

== Awards ==
=== Hong Kong Top Footballer Awards ===
Awards	Prize Winner	Club	Score / Votes
Footballer of the Year	(Turkmenistan) Ruslan Mingazov	Kitchee	69.33%
Coach of the Year	(Hong Kong) Roberto Losada	Eastern	53.91%
Young Players of the Year	(Hong Kong) Sun Ming Him	Eastern	57.58%
Young Players of the Year	(Hong Kong) Wong Ho Chun	Eastern	33.52%
Players' Player	(Hong Kong) Chan Siu Kwan	Resources Capital	30
Most Favorite Player	(England) Freddie Toomer	HKFC	1,712
Hong Kong Top Footballers
Goalkeeper	(Hong Kong) Yapp Hung Fai	Eastern	47.27%
Defenders	(Brazil) Gabriel Cividini	Tai Po	54.61%
Defenders	(Hong Kong) Hélio	Kitchee	36.54%
Defenders	(South Korea) Kim Min-kyu	Rangers	31.94%
Defenders	(Hong Kong) Tsui Wang Kit	Lee Man	55.98%
Midfielders	(Hong Kong) Lam Hin Ting	Rangers	32.39%
Midfielders	(Brazil) Cleiton	Kitchee	39.04%
Midfielders	(Brazil) Mikael	Kitchee	39.51%
Forwards	(Brazil) Everton Camargo	Lee Man	47.39%
Forwards	(Turkmenistan) Ruslan Mingazov	Kitchee	69.33%
Forwards	(Hong Kong) Sun Ming Him	Eastern	53.54%
