= 2021–22 Hong Kong Sapling Cup =

Hong Kong football season

Tournament details
- Country: Hong Kong
- Dates: 18 September 2021 – 8 May 2022
- Teams: 8

Final positions
- Champions: None
- Runners-up: None

Tournament statistics
- Matches played: 33
- Goals scored: 111 (3.36 per match)
- All statistics correct as of 5 January 2022.

The 2021–22 Hong Kong Sapling Cup was the 7th edition of the Sapling Cup, and was the fourth time in history without name sponsorship. The competition is contested by the 8 teams in the 2021–22 Hong Kong Premier League. Each team was required to field a minimum of three players born on or after 1 January 2000 (U-22) and a maximum of six foreign players during every whole match, with no more than four foreign players on the pitch at the same time.

Eastern were the defending champions.

== Format ==
Different from last season, the 2021–22 Sapling Cup is based on a system of double round league. The team with the highest points will be the champions.

== Effects of the COVID-19 pandemic ==
On 5 January 2022, the Hong Kong government announced a tightening of social distancing measures between 7 January to 20 January in order to control the Omicron outbreak. Public recreation facilities, such as football pitches, were closed and members of the public were barred from gathering in groups of more than two, making it impossible for the season to continue. The Hong Kong Football Association announced on the same day that it would also postpone any scheduled matches in the successive two week period.

After the measures were extended several times in the successive weeks, the government announced on 22 February that it would extend the measures until 20 April, making it near impossible to complete the season before most player contracts end on 31 May. The HKFA held an emergency meeting with the clubs on 25 February, after which it was determined that the remainder of the season would be cancelled.

== League table ==
Pos	Team	Pld	W	D	L	GF	GA	GD	Pts
1	Eastern	9	6	3	0	25	7	+18	21
2	Kitchee	9	6	1	2	21	12	+9	19
3	Southern	9	5	3	1	14	10	+4	18
4	Lee Man	7	5	1	1	16	6	+10	16
5	Rangers	8	2	2	4	11	15	−4	8
6	Resources Capital	9	1	3	5	12	17	−5	6
7	HK U23	7	1	1	5	6	21	−15	4
8	HKFC	8	0	0	8	6	23	−17	0

Updated to match(es) played on 5 January 2022. Source: Hong Kong Football Association
Rules for classification: 1) Points; 2) Head-to-head points; 3) Head-to-head goal difference; 4) Head-to-head goals scored; 5) Goal difference; 6) Goals scored; 7) Fair-play points; 8) Drawing lots (Play-off if the winner has to be decided).

== Results ==
Home \ Away	KIT	EAS	LEE	SOU	RAN	RES	HKF	U23
Kitchee	—	1–1		2–0	3–2	5–2		
Eastern		—			2–0	1–1	3–1	7–0
Lee Man	3–0	1–3	—	0–0			5–0	
Southern	3–1	3–3		—	0–0	2–1		3–2
Rangers	0–3		1–2		—		3–2	2–0
Resources Capital		0–2	1–2	0–1	3–3	—	3–0	
HKFC	0–2		1–3	1–2			—	
HK U23	1–4	0–3				1–1	2–1	—

Updated to match(es) played on 5 January 2022. Source: HKFA
Legend: Blue = home team win; Yellow = draw; Red = away team win.

== Fixtures and results ==
18 September 2021 SP01	Eastern	2–0	Rangers	Tseung Kwan O, New Territories
15:30	Sun Ming Him 47'; Fung Hing Wa 81'	Report		Stadium: Tseung Kwan O Sports Ground; Attendance: 573; Referee: Yu Kin Fung

18 September 2021 SP02	Lee Man	3–0	Kitchee	Siu Sai Wan, Hong Kong Island
18:00	Ángel 41' (pen.); Gil 79'; Tsui Wang Kit 90+3'	Report		Stadium: Siu Sai Wan Sports Ground; Attendance: 472; Referee: Tam Ping Wun

19 September 2021 SP03	HKFC	1–2	Southern	Tsing Yi, New Territories
15:00	Scott 1'	Report	Ha 25'; Dudu 90+4'	Stadium: Tsing Yi Sports Ground; Attendance: 546; Referee: Liu Kwok Man

22 September 2021 SP04	Kitchee	1–1	Eastern	Mong Kok, Kowloon
20:00	Damjanović 17'	Report	Naveed 51'	Stadium: Mong Kok Stadium; Attendance: 1,437; Referee: Woo Chun Sing

25 September 2021 SP05	Southern	2–1	Resources Capital	Tai Po, New Territories
15:30	Pereira 51'; Sasaki 84' (pen.)	Report	Ho Sze Chit 11'	Stadium: Tai Po Sports Ground; Attendance: 480; Referee: Wong Wai Lun

25 September 2021 SP06	HKFC	1–3	Lee Man	Mong Kok, Kowloon
18:00	Fray 80'	Report	Nakaruma 3', 90+1'; Bleda 68'	Stadium: Mong Kok Stadium; Attendance: 622; Referee: Poon Chun-kit

26 September 2021 SP07	Rangers	0–3	Kitchee	Aberdeen, Hong Kong
15:30		Report	Chan 67'; Damjanović 86'; Hélio 90+2'	Stadium: Aberdeen Sports Ground; Attendance: 515; Referee: Ho Wai Sing

28 September 2021 SP08	Lee Man	0–0	Southern	Mong Kok, Kowloon
20:00		Report		Stadium: Mong Kok Stadium; Attendance: 811; Referee: Luk Kin Sun

1 October 2021 SP09	Resources Capital	3–0	HKFC	Mong Kok, Kowloon
15:30	Ho Sze Chit 1'; Sá 6', 43'	Report		Stadium: Mong Kok Stadium; Attendance: 681; Referee: Lau Fong Hei

1 December 2021 SP10	Rangers	2–0	HK U23	Mong Kok, Kowloon
20:00	Juninho 34'; Bazán 64'	Report		Stadium: Mong Kok Stadium; Attendance: 326; Referee: Yu Kin Fung

2 October 2021 SP11	Lee Man	1–3	Eastern	Diamond Hill, Kowloon
15:30	Gil 63'	Report	Clayton 13'; Everton 75'; Yue Tze Nam 82'	Stadium: Hammer Hill Road Sports Ground; Attendance: 892; Referee: Tam Ping Wun

3 October 2021 SP12	Kitchee	2–0	Southern	Tseung Kwan O, New Territories
15:30	Orr 5'; Damjanović 49'	Report		Stadium: Tseung Kwan O Sports Ground; Attendance: 832; Referee: Yu Kin Fung

5 October 2021 SP13	HK U23	1–1	Resources Capital	Mong Kok, Kowloon
20:00	Canal 51' (o.g.)	Report	Canal 58'	Stadium: Mong Kok Stadium; Attendance: 919; Referee: Tang Hing Fu

5 January 2022 SP14	Resources Capital	1–2	Lee Man	Mong Kok, Kowloon
20:00	Sá 84'	Report	Acosta 2'; Ngan Lok Fung 12'	Stadium: Mong Kok Stadium; Attendance: 0 Referee: Wong Wai Lun

10 October 2021 SP15	Eastern	7–0	HK U23	Yuen Long, New Territories
15:30	Everton 6', 37'; Sun Ming Him 45+1'; Ma Hei Wai 48'; Marcos 57'; Mikael 76'; Khan 85'	Report		Stadium: Yuen Long Stadium; Attendance: 451; Referee: Law Bik Chi

10 October 2021 SP16	Rangers	3–2	HKFC	Tsing Yi, New Territories
18:00	Yeung Dik Lun 35'; Juninho 48', 63'	Report	Fok 45+3'; Schipper 90+6'	Stadium: Tsing Yi Sports Ground; Attendance: 280; Referee: Tam Ping Wun

14 October 2021 SP17	Southern	3–2	HK U23	Mong Kok, Kowloon
15:30	Pereira 21'; Dudu 30'; Ju Yingzhi 45+2'	Report	Chan Yun Tung 70'; Ng Man Hei 90+1'	Stadium: Mong Kok Stadium; Attendance: 722; Referee: Woo Chun Sing

19 December 2021 SP18	Rangers	1–2	Lee Man	Yuen Long, New Territories
17:30	Lo Kwan Yee 88' (pen.)	Report	Wong Chun Ho 15'; Bleda 45+2'	Stadium: Yuen Long Stadium; Attendance: 374; Referee: Wong Wai Lun

16 October 2021 SP19	Kitchee	5–2	Resources Capital	Tai Po, New Territories
15:30	Damjanović 35', 43', 78'; Hélio 71'; Alex 88'	Report	Sá 4' (pen.); Ki Sze Ho 45+2'	Stadium: Tai Po Sports Ground; Attendance: 586; Referee: Luk Kin Sun

17 October 2021 SP20	Southern	3–3	Eastern	Tai Po, New Territories
15:30	Pereira 19', 44'; Sasaki 76' (pen.)	Report	Sun Ming Him 11', 35'; Clayton 90+1'	Stadium: Tai Po Sports Ground; Attendance: 556; Referee: Wong Wai Lun

17 October 2021 SP21	HK U23	2–1	HKFC	Mong Kok, Kowloon
18:00	Cheung Chun Hin 88'; Law Hiu Chung 90+6' (pen.)	Report	Harrington 45+2'	Stadium: Mong Kok Stadium; Attendance: 494; Referee: Liu Kwok Man

14 November 2021 SP22	HKFC	0–2	Kitchee	Siu Sai Wan, Hong Kong Island
15:00		Report	Gavilán 43' (pen.); Tong Kin Man 67'	Stadium: Siu Sai Wan Sports Ground; Attendance: 379; Referee: Law Bik Chi

19 January 2022 SP23	Lee Man	Cancelled	HK U23	Mong Kok, Kowloon
20:00		Report		Stadium: Mong Kok Stadium

20 November 2021 SP24	Resources Capital	3–3	Rangers	Tai Po, New Territories
15:00	Sá 3', 71'; Liu Yik Shing 24'	Report	Kilama 62'; Juninho 80', 89'	Stadium: Tai Po Sports Ground; Attendance: 272; Referee: Luk Kin Sun

4 December 2021 SP25	Eastern	3–1	HKFC	Tseung Kwan O, New Territories
15:00	Wong Tsz Ho 9'; Powell 55' (o.g.); Khan 73'	Report	Léo 45+2'	Stadium: Tseung Kwan O Sports Ground; Attendance: 307; Referee: Law Bik Chi

11 December 2021 SP26	Eastern	1–1	Resources Capital	Siu Sai Wan, Hong Kong Island
16:30	Everton 15'	Report	Sá 90+6' (pen.)	Stadium: Siu Sai Wan Sports Ground; Attendance: 465; Referee: Woo Chun Sing

11 December 2021 SP27	Southern	0–0	Rangers	Siu Sai Wan, Hong Kong Island
19:00		Report		Stadium: Siu Sai Wan Sports Ground; Attendance: 465; Referee: Lau Fong Hei

12 December 2021 SP28	HK U23	1–4	Kitchee	Diamond Hill, Kowloon
15:00	Law Hiu Chung 74' (pen.)	Report	Chan Siu Kwan 11'; Ichikawa 19'; Chan 33'; Orr 56'	Stadium: Hammer Hill Road Sports Ground; Attendance: 503; Referee: Yu Kin Fung

18 December 2021 SP29	Southern	3–1	Kitchee	Tsing Yi, New Territories
15:00	Khan 48', 67'; Pereira 61'	Report	Chang Kwong Yin 90+4'	Stadium: Tsing Yi Sports Ground; Attendance: 605; Referee: Tang Hing Fu

19 December 2021 SP30	Resources Capital	0–2	Eastern	Sham Shui Po, Kowloon
15:00		Report	Sun Ming Him 40' (pen.); Everton 59'	Stadium: Sham Shui Po Sports Ground; Attendance: 548; Referee: Law Bik Chi

2 January 2022 SP31	Kitchee	3–2	Rangers	Yuen Long, New Territories
15:00	Gavilán 24' (pen.); Damjanović 69' (pen.), 70'	Report	Bazán 66' (pen.), 87' (pen.)	Stadium: Yuen Long Stadium; Attendance: 634; Referee: Woo Chun Sing

1 January 2022 SP32	Lee Man	5–0	HKFC	Mong Kok, Kowloon
17:30	Kim Seung-yong 15'; Nakamura 32'; Acosta 39'; Wong Ho Chun 48'; Yu Wai Lim 56'	Report		Stadium: Mong Kok Stadium; Attendance: 487; Referee: Law Bik Chi

1 January 2022 SP33	HK U23	0–3	Eastern	Tai Po, New Territories
15:00		Report	Sun Ming Him 16', 85'; Dovale 56'	Stadium: Tai Po Sports Ground; Attendance: 296; Referee: Ho Wai Sing

2 January 2022 SP34	Resources Capital	0–1	Southern	Mong Kok, Kowloon
17:30		Report	Pereira 55'	Stadium: Mong Kok Stadium; Attendance: 531; Referee: Luk Kin Sun

8 January 2022 SP35	Rangers	Cancelled	Eastern	Tseung Kwan O, New Territories
15:00		Report		Stadium: Tseung Kwan O Sports Ground

8 January 2022 SP36	Southern	Cancelled	HKFC	Mong Kok, Kowloon
17:30		Report		Stadium: Mong Kok Stadium

9 January 2022 SP37	Kitchee	Cancelled	Lee Man	Tai Po, New Territories
15:00		Report		Stadium: Tai Po Sports Ground

9 January 2022 SP38	Resources Capital	Cancelled	HK U23	Mong Kok, Kowloon
17:30		Report		Stadium: Mong Kok Stadium

== Top scorers ==
Rank	Player	Club	Goals
1	(Montenegro) Dejan Damjanović	Kitchee	8
2	(Hong Kong) Sun Ming Him	Eastern	7
2	(Brazil) Felipe Sá	Resources Capital	7
3	(Brazil) Stefan Pereira	Southern	6
4	(Brazil) Juninho	Rangers	5
4	(Brazil) Everton	Eastern	5
5	(Pakistan) Naveed Khan	Eastern	3
5	(Hong Kong) Yuto Nakamura	Lee Man	3
5	(Argentina) Leandro Bazán	Rangers	3
5	(Brazil) Gil	Lee Man	2
5	(Spain) Manolo Bleda	Lee Man	2
5	(Argentina) Jonathan Acosta	Lee Man	2
5	(Hong Kong) Hélio	Kitchee	2
5	(Hong Kong) Shinichi Chan	Kitchee	2
5	(Hong Kong) Matt Orr	Kitchee	2
5	(Spain) Manuel Gavilán	Kitchee	2
5	(Hong Kong) Ho Sze Chit	Resources Capital	2
5	(Hong Kong) Clayton	Eastern	2
5	(Brazil) Dudu	Southern	2
5	(Japan) Shu Sasaki	Southern	2
5	(Hong Kong) Jahangir Khan	Southern	2
5	(Hong Kong) Law Hiu Chung	HK U23	2
