= 2020–21 Hong Kong Sapling Cup =

Football tournament season

Tournament details
- Country: Hong Kong
- Dates: 24 October 2020 – 7 April 2021
- Teams: 8

Final positions
- Champions: Eastern (1st title)
- Runners-up: Happy Valley

Tournament statistics
- Matches played: 26
- Goals scored: 81 (3.12 per match)
- Top goal scorer(s): Sandro; Matt Orr (8 goals)

Awards
- Best player: Eduardo Praes
- All statistics correct as of 7 April 2021.

The 2020–21 Hong Kong Sapling Cup was the 6th edition of the Sapling Cup, and was the third time in history without name sponsorship. The competition was contested by the 8 teams in the 2020–21 Hong Kong Premier League. Each team was required to field a minimum of three players born on or after 1 January 1999 (U-22) and a maximum of six foreign players during every whole match, with no more than four foreign players on the pitch at the same time.

Kitchee were the defending champions, but were eliminated in the semi-finals. Eastern became the champions for the first time after beating Happy Valley in the final.

== Calendar ==
Phase	Round	Draw Date	Date	Matches	Clubs
Group stage	Matchday 1	20 October 2020	24–25 October 2020	24	8 → 4
Group stage	Matchday 2	20 October 2020	28, 31 October 2020; 11 November 2020	24	8 → 4
Group stage	Matchday 3	20 October 2020	1, 4, 18 November 2020	24	8 → 4
Group stage	Matchday 4	20 October 2020	7–8 November 2020	24	8 → 4
Group stage	Matchday 5	20 October 2020	14–15 November 2020	24	8 → 4
Group stage	Matchday 6	20 October 2020	20–21 February 2021	24	8 → 4
Knockout phase	Semi-finals	20 October 2020	24 February 2021	2	4 → 2
Knockout phase	Final	20 October 2020	7 April 2021 at Mong Kok Stadium	1	2 → 1

== Group stage ==
=== Group A ===
Pos	Team	Pld	W	D	L	GF	GA	GD	Pts	Qualification
1	Lee Man	6	3	3	0	11	2	+9	12	Advance to Semi-finals
2	Kitchee	6	3	3	0	11	4	+7	12	Advance to Semi-finals
3	Pegasus	6	2	1	3	8	14	−6	7	
4	Rangers	6	0	1	5	6	16	−10	1	

Source: Hong Kong Football Association
Rules for classification: 1) Points; 2) Head-to-head points; 3) Head-to-head goal difference; 4) Goal difference; 5) Goals scored.

25 October 2020 MD1	Pegasus	0–5	Lee Man	Sham Shui Po, Kowloon
15:00		Report	Chang Hei Yin 26'; Acosta 29', 30'; Leong Ka Hang 39'; Tang Hong Yin 44'	Stadium: Sham Shui Po Sports Ground; Attendance: 0 Referee: Tam Ping Wun

25 October 2020 MD1	Kitchee	3–0	Rangers	Yuen Long, New Territories
17:30	Orr 6', 31', 58'	Report		Stadium: Yuen Long Stadium; Attendance: 0 Referee: Wong Wai Lun

31 October 2020 MD2	Lee Man	0–0	Kitchee	Diamond Hill, Kowloon
15:00		Report		Stadium: Hammer Hill Road Sports Ground; Attendance: 0 Referee: Ng Chiu Kok

31 October 2020 MD2	Rangers	0–2	Pegasus	Siu Sai Wan, Hong Kong Island
17:30		Report	Wu Chun Ming 49'; Chan Hiu Fung 62'	Stadium: Siu Sai Wan Sports Ground; Attendance: 0 Referee: Liu Kwok Man

4 November 2020 MD3	Pegasus	0–0	Kitchee	Mong Kok, Kowloon
20:00		Report		Stadium: Mong Kok Stadium; Attendance: 0 Referee: Tam Ping Wun

8 November 2020 MD4	Lee Man	4–1	Pegasus	Yuen Long, New Territories
15:00	Tang Hong Yin 49'; Leong Ka Hang 78', 90'; Wong Ho Chun 90+1'	Report	Tse Long Hin 75' (pen.)	Stadium: Yuen Long Stadium; Attendance: 394; Referee: Lau Fong Hei

8 November 2020 MD4	Rangers	3–5	Kitchee	Mong Kok, Kowloon
17:30	Juninho 4'; Lam Ka Wai 12'; Lam Hok Hei 67'	Report	Orr 29', 45', 51'; Buddle 54'; Gavilán 78' (pen.)	Stadium: Mong Kok Stadium; Attendance: 694; Referee: Law Bik Chi

14 November 2020 MD5	Pegasus	4–2	Rangers	Aberdeen, Hong Kong Island
15:00	Júnior 7', 13'; Nilson 19'; Ng Man Hei 81'	Report	Lam Hok Hei 67'; Kilama 87'	Stadium: Aberdeen Sports Ground; Attendance: 134; Referee: Liu Kwok Man

14 November 2020 MD5	Kitchee	0–0	Lee Man	Tsing Yi, New Territories
17:30		Report		Stadium: Tsing Yi Sports Ground; Attendance: 654; Referee: Lau Fong Hei

18 November 2020 MD3	Rangers	1–1	Lee Man	Mong Kok, Kowloon
20:00	Lam Hok Hei 90+2'	Report	Leong Ka Hang 55'	Stadium: Mong Kok Stadium; Attendance: 453; Referee: Poon Chun Kit

20 February 2021 MD6	Kitchee	3–1	Pegasus	Mong Kok, Kowloon
19:00	Orr 8', 57'; Hélio 84'	Report	Marquinhos 39'	Stadium: Mong Kok Stadium; Attendance: 1,191; Referee: Woo Chun Sing

21 February 2021 MD6	Lee Man	1–0	Rangers	Mong Kok, Kowloon
19:00	N'dri 23'	Report		Stadium: Mong Kok Stadium; Attendance: 520; Referee: Wong Ka Ho

=== Group B ===
Pos	Team	Pld	W	D	L	GF	GA	GD	Pts	Qualification
1	Eastern	6	4	1	1	17	7	+10	13	Advance to Semi-finals
2	Happy Valley	6	4	1	1	12	4	+8	13	Advance to Semi-finals
3	Southern	6	1	3	2	8	12	−4	6	
4	Resources Capital	6	0	1	5	5	19	−14	1	

Source: Hong Kong Football Association
Rules for classification: 1) Points; 2) Head-to-head points; 3) Head-to-head goal difference; 4) Goal difference; 5) Goals scored.

24 October 2020 MD1	Southern	3–2	Resources Capital	Mong Kok, Kowloon
15:00	Chan Kwong Ho 50', 57'; Beto 90+2'	Report	Sá 5', 64'	Stadium: Mong Kok Stadium; Attendance: 0 Referee: Ho Wai Sing

24 October 2020 MD1	Eastern	1–2	Happy Valley	Siu Sai Wan, Hong Kong Island
17:30	Sandro 80'	Report	Yip Cheuk Man 90+1'; Luciano 90+3'	Stadium: Siu Sai Wan Sports Ground; Attendance: 0 Referee: Lau Fong Hei

28 October 2020 MD2	Eastern	5–0	Resources Capital	Mong Kok, Kowloon
20:00	Everton 33', 59', 90+2'; Khan 80', 83'	Report		Stadium: Mong Kok Stadium; Attendance: 0 Referee: Woo Chun Sing

1 November 2020 MD3	Southern	1–4	Eastern	Tai Po, New Territories
15:00	Pereira 6' (pen.)	Report	Sandro 43', 55'; Everton 52'; Leung Kwun Chung 66'	Stadium: Tai Po Sports Ground; Attendance: 0 Referee: Luk Kin Sun

1 November 2020 MD3	Happy Valley	2–0	Resources Capital	Mong Kok, Kowloon
17:30	Luciano 77'; Moore 90+4'	Report		Stadium: Mong Kok Stadium; Attendance: 0 Referee: Yu Kin Fung

7 November 2020 MD4	Resources Capital	1–1	Southern	Yuen Long, New Territories
15:00	Wong Wai Kwok 18'	Report	James Ha 11'	Stadium: Yuen Long Stadium; Attendance: 235; Referee: Tang Hing Fu

7 November 2020 MD4	Happy Valley	0–2	Eastern	Mong Kok, Kowloon
17:30		Report	Sandro 11' (pen.); Lucas 37'	Stadium: Mong Kok Stadium; Attendance: 850; Referee: Wong Ka Ho

11 November 2020 MD2	Happy Valley	0–0	Southern	Mong Kok, Kowloon
20:00		Report		Stadium: Mong Kok Stadium; Attendance: 463; Referee: Wong Kei Hoi

15 November 2020 MD5	Resources Capital	1–6	Happy Valley	Diamond Hill, Kowloon
15:00	Tena 90+3'	Report	Mikael 24' (pen.), 55', 70'; Odu 40', 45+1', 59'	Stadium: Hammer Hill Road Sports Ground; Attendance: 464; Referee: Luk Kin Sun

15 November 2020 MD5	Eastern	3–3	Southern	Mong Kok, Kowloon
17:30	Lucas 37'; Sandro 70'; Diego 90+1'	Report	Sasaki 54' (pen.); Beto 89'; Stefan 90+4'	Stadium: Mong Kok Stadium; Attendance: 754; Referee: Woo Chun Sing

20 February 2021 MD6	Southern	0–2	Happy Valley	Siu Sai Wan, Hong Kong Island
15:00		Report	Luciano 32'; Chu Wai Kwan 58'	Stadium: Siu Sai Wan Sports Ground; Attendance: 349; Referee: Wong Wai Lun

21 February 2021 MD6	Resources Capital	1–2	Eastern	Siu Sai Wan, Hong Kong Island
15:00	Law Chun Yan 9'	Report	Sandro 13', 22'	Stadium: Siu Sai Wan Sports Ground; Attendance: 303; Referee: Yu Kin Fung

== Semi-finals ==
The semi-final took place on 24 February 2021 at Mong Kok Stadium.

24 February 2021 SF	Lee Man	w/o	Happy Valley	Mong Kok, Kowloon
19:00		Report		Stadium: Mong Kok Stadium

24 February 2021 SF	Eastern	1–0	Kitchee	Mong Kok, Kowloon
19:00	Sandro 35'	Report		Stadium: Mong Kok Stadium; Attendance: 1,557; Referee: Yu Kin Fung

== Final ==
The final took place on 7 April 2021 at Mong Kok Stadium.

7 April 2021 F	Happy Valley	0–2	Eastern	Mong Kok, Kowloon
20:00		Report	Eduardo 38'; Lum 81'	Stadium: Mong Kok Stadium; Attendance: 2,243; Referee: Wong Wai Lun

== Top scorers ==
Rank	Player	Club	Goals
1	(Hong Kong) Matt Orr	Kitchee	8
1	(Hong Kong) Sandro	Eastern	8
3	(Brazil) Everton	Eastern	4
3	(Macau) Leong Ka Hang	Lee Man	4
5	(Brazil) Mikael	Happy Valley	3
5	(Nigeria) Robert Odu	Happy Valley	3
5	(Hong Kong) Lam Hok Hei	Rangers	3
5	(Brazil) Luciano	Happy Valley	3
8	(Hong Kong) Chan Kwong Ho	Southern	2
8	(Brazil) Felipe Sá	Resources Capital	2
8	(Argentina) Jonathan Acosta	Lee Man	2
8	(Hong Kong) Tang Hong Yin	Lee Man	2
8	(Hong Kong) Naveed Khan	Eastern	2
8	(Brazil) Júnior Goiano	Pegasus	2
8	(Brazil) Lucas Silva	Eastern	2
8	(Brazil) Beto Fronza	Southern	2

== Remarks ==
1. Match was played behind closed doors due to the 2020 coronavirus pandemic in Hong Kong.
