= Wong Ho Yin =

Hong Kong footballer

Personal information
- Full name: Wong Ho Yin
- Date of birth: 12 June 1998 (age 28)
- Place of birth: Hong Kong
- Height: 1.84 m (6 ft 0 in)
- Position: Centre back

Team information
- Current team: North District
- Number: 15

Youth career
- –2014: CFCSSHK
- 2014–2016: South China
- 2016–2018: Happy Valley

Senior career*
| Years | Team | Apps | (Gls) |
| 2018–2021 | Happy Valley | 39 | (2) |
| 2021–2023 | HK U23 | 21 | (1) |
| 2023–2024 | Eastern | 10 | (0) |
| 2024–2025 | Southern | 20 | (3) |
| 2025– | North District | 25 | (0) |
- * Club domestic league appearances and goals as of 20 November 2026

Wong Ho Yin (Chinese: 黃浩然; born 12 June 1998) is a Hong Kong professional footballer who currently plays as a centre back for Hong Kong Premier League club North District.

== Club career ==
On 28 June 2023, Wong joined Eastern after two seasons at HK U23.

On 2 October 2024, Wong joined Southern.

On 23 July 2025, Wong joined North District.

== Career statistics ==
=== Club ===
As of 7 May 2023

| Club | Season | League | | | National Cup | | League Cup | | Other | | Total | |
| Club | Season | Division | Apps | Goals | Apps | Goals | Apps | Goals | Apps | Goals | Apps | Goals |
|---|---|---|---|---|---|---|---|---|---|---|---|---|
| Happy Valley | 2018–19 | Hong Kong First Division | 10 | 1 | 0 | 0 | 0 | 0 | 0 | 0 | 10 | 1 |
| Happy Valley | 2019–20 | Hong Kong Premier League | 5 | 0 | 0 | 0 | 2 (Note: Appearances in the Hong Kong Sapling Cup) | 0 | 0 | 0 | 7 | 0 |
| Happy Valley | 2020–21 | Hong Kong Premier League | 10 (Note: 2 appearances in the Hong Kong Premier League relegation group) | 1 | 0 | 0 | 5 | 0 | 0 | 0 | 15 | 1 |
| Happy Valley | Total | | 25 | 2 | 0 | 0 | 7 | 0 | 0 | 0 | 32 | 2 |
| HK U23 | 2021–22 | Hong Kong Premier League | 4 | 0 | 1 | 0 | 7 | 0 | 0 | 0 | 12 | 0 |
| HK U23 | 2022–23 | Hong Kong Premier League | 17 | 1 | 1 | 0 | 7 | 1 | 1 (Note: Appearances in the Hong Kong Senior Challenge Shield) | 0 | 26 | 2 |
| HK U23 | Total | | 21 | 1 | 2 | 0 | 14 | 1 | 1 | 0 | 38 | 2 |
| Career total | | | 46 | 3 | 2 | 0 | 21 | 1 | 1 | 0 | 70 | 4 |

== Honour ==
Eastern

- Hong Kong FA Cup: 2023–24

Southern

- Hong Kong Sapling Cup: 2024–25
