= Jesús Díaz =

Jesús Díaz may refer to:

- Jesús Díaz (baseball), (1925–1988), Mexican baseball player and manager
- Jesús Díaz (football referee) (born 1954), Colombian football referee
- Jesús Díaz (writer) (1941–2002), Cuban writer
- Jesus Sixto Diaz-Rodriguez (aka Sixto Rodriguez) (1942–2023), American folksinger
- Jesús González Díaz (born 1994), simply known as Jesús, Spanish footballer
- Jesús Ildefonso Díaz (born 1950), Spanish mathematician
- Jesús Díaz (footballer, born 1999), Colombian footballer
- Jesús Díaz (footballer, born 2004), Colombian footballer
