= João Gil =

Portuguese football player

Personal information
- Full name: João Gil Zhu Zhang
- Date of birth: 17 November 1998 (age 27)
- Place of birth: Portugal
- Height: 1.85 m (6 ft 1 in)
- Positions: Centre back; right back

Youth career
- 2003–2011: Benfica
- 2011–2014: Palmense
- 2014–2015: Alta de Lisboa
- 2015–2016: Loures
- 2016–2017: Oeiras
- 2017–2020: Cova da Piedade

Senior career*
Years	Team	Apps	(Gls)
2019–2021	Cova da Piedade B	8	(0)
2021–2022	Montijo	25	(0)
2022–2023	Eastern	10	(2)
- * Club domestic league appearances and goals as of 30 June 2023

João Gil Zhu Zhang (born 17 November 1998) is a Portuguese professional footballer who plays as a defender and is currently a free agent.

== Club career ==
Born in Portugal, Gil started his career with Benfica, before progressing through the academies of local teams, eventually signing for Cova da Piedade.

In August 2022, Gil signed for Hong Kong Premier League club Eastern.

== Career statistics ==
=== Club ===
As of 16 October 2022.

Club	Season	League			Cup		Continental		Other		Total	
Club	Season	Division	Apps	Goals	Apps	Goals	Apps	Goals	Apps	Goals	Apps	Goals
Cova da Piedade B	2018–19	I AF Setúbal	1	0	–		–		0	0	1	0
Cova da Piedade B	2019–20	I AF Setúbal	7	0	–		–		0	0	7	0
Cova da Piedade B	Total		8	0	0	0	0	0	0	0	8	0
Montijo	2021–22	I AF Setúbal	25	0	–		–		0	0	25	0
Eastern	2022–23	Hong Kong Premier League	2	0	0	0	1 (Note: Appearances in the AFC Cup)	0	0	0	3	0
Career total			35	0	0	0	1	0	0	0	36	0
