= Kim Min-kyu (footballer, born 2000) =

South Korean footballer (born 2000)

Personal information
- Full name: Kim Min-kyu
- Date of birth: 7 July 2000 (age 26)
- Place of birth: South Korea
- Height: 1.80 m (5 ft 11 in)
- Position: Defender

Youth career
- 2013–2015: Yesan Middle School
- 2016–2018: Yesan
- 2019–2020: Jeonju University

Senior career*
Years	Team	Apps	(Gls)
2020–2021	FC Avenir	1	(0)
2021	Hoi King	10	(6)
2021–2024	Hong Kong Rangers	40	(5)
2024–2025	Lee Man	18	(0)
- * Club domestic league appearances and goals as of 25 May 2025

- Kim Min-kyu
- Hangul: 김민규
- RR: Gim Mingyu
- MR: Kim Min'gyu

Kim Min-kyu (Korean: 김민규; born 7 July 2000) is a South Korean professional footballer who plays as a defender.

== Club career ==
In July 2021, Kim joined Rangers.

On 23 July 2024, Kim joined Lee Man.

== Career statistics ==
=== Club ===
As of 5 February 2023

Club	Season	League			Cup		League Cup		Total	
Club	Season	Division	Apps	Goals	Apps	Goals	Apps	Goals	Apps	Goals
Hoi King	2020–21	Hong Kong First Division	10	6	0	0	0	0	10	6
Rangers	2021–22	Hong Kong Premier League	4	1	2	0	8 (Note: Appearances in the Sapling Cup)	0	14	1
Rangers	2022–23	Hong Kong Premier League	9	2	4	0	4	0	17	2
Rangers	Total		13	3	6	0	12	0	31	3
Career total			23	9	6	0	12	0	41	9

== Honours ==
=== Club ===
Rangers

- Hong Kong Sapling Cup: 2023–24
