= Ryota Hayashi =

Japanese footballer (born 1995)

Personal information
- Full name: Ryota Hayashi
- Date of birth: 10 April 1995 (age 31)
- Place of birth: Kawasaki, Kanagawa, Japan
- Height: 1.75 m (5 ft 9 in)
- Positions: Centre-back; defensive midfielder

Team information
- Current team: HKFC
- Number: 5

Youth career
- 2011–2013: Hosei University Daini High School

College career
Years	Team	Apps	(Gls)
2014–2017	Hosei University		

Senior career*
Years	Team	Apps	(Gls)
2018–2019	Angkor Tiger		
2021	Sea Hawks FC		
2021–2026	Rangers (HKG)	71	(7)
2026–	HKFC	6	(1)
- * Club domestic league appearances and goals as of 8 November 2026

Ryota Hayashi (林 遼太, Hayashi Ryōta; born 10 April 1995) is a Japanese professional footballer who currently plays as a defender for Hong Kong Premier League club HKFC.

Besides Japan, he has played in Cambodia and Sri Lanka.

== Club career ==
Before the 2018 season, Hayashi signed for Cambodian side Angkor Tiger. In 2019, he left Angkor Tiger.

Before the 2021 season, Hayashi signed for Sea Hawks FC in Sri Lanka.

In November 2021, Hayashi signed for Hong Kong Premier League club Rangers. On 20 November 2021, Hayashi debuted for the club during a 3–3 draw with RCFC.

On 21 August 2026, Hayashi joined another HKPL club HKFC.

== Honours ==
=== Club ===
Rangers

- Hong Kong Sapling Cup: 2023–24
