= Thiago (footballer, born 1991) =

Brazilian footballer

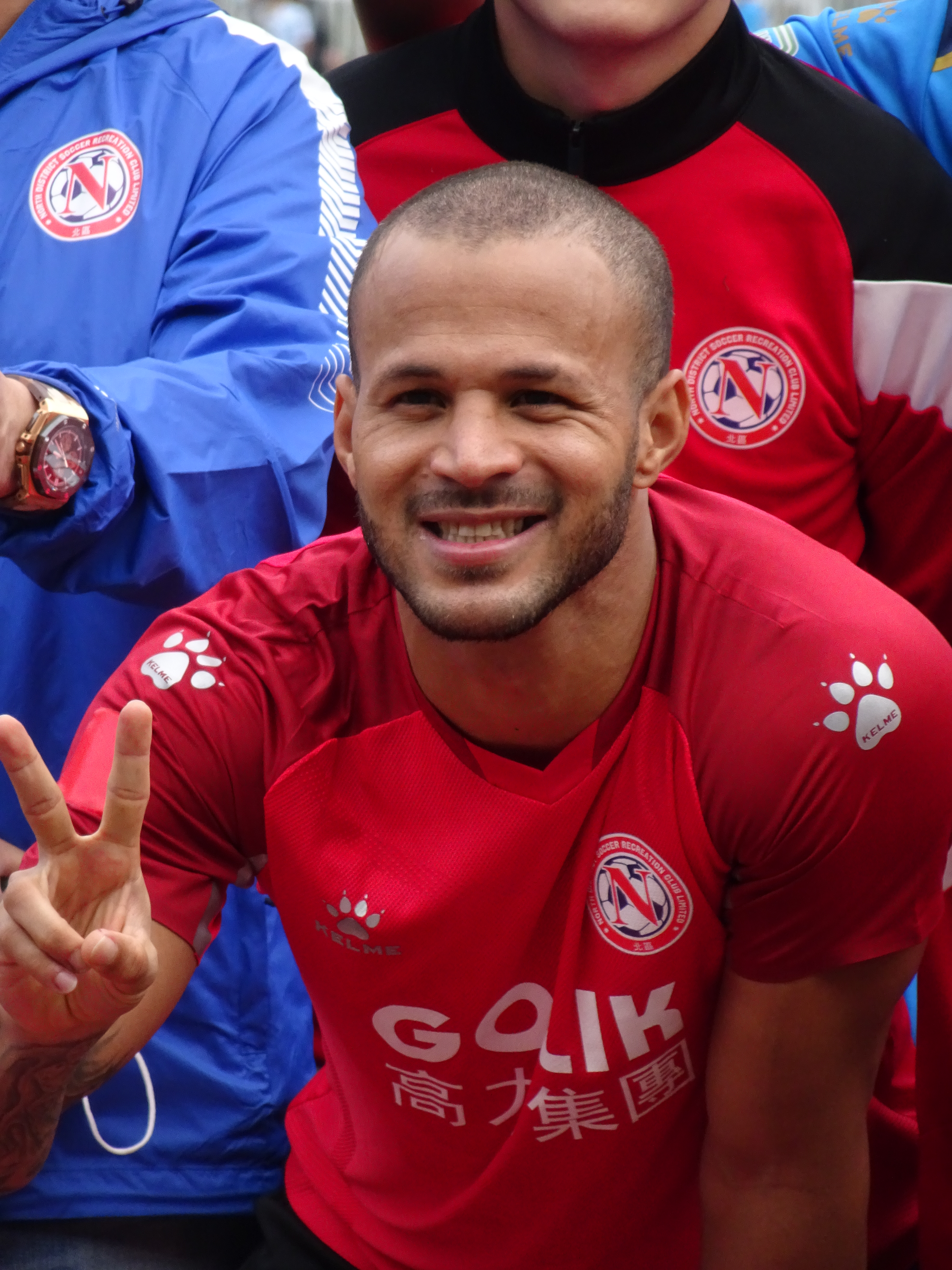

Personal information
- Full name: Thiago Lima da Silva
- Date of birth: 22 November 1991 (age 34)
- Place of birth: Maceió, Brazil
- Height: 1.83 m (6 ft 0 in)
- Position: Midfielder

Senior career*
Years	Team	Apps	(Gls)
2010–2011	Rio Branco-SP	0	(0)
2012	CSA		
2013	Espírito Santo		
2014	Itaboraí	0	(0)
2015	Monte Carlo	17	(13)
2017	Managua	14	(4)
2019	Ka I	13	(7)
2020–2021	North District	14	(11)
2021–2022	Yuen Long	12	(9)
2022–2023	Sham Shui Po	6	(0)
2023–2024	HKFC	21	(5)
- * Club domestic league appearances and goals as of 31 July 2024

Thiago Lima da Silva (born 22 November 1991), commonly known as Thiago, is a former Brazilian professional footballer who played as a midfielder.

== Club career ==
=== Sham Shui Po ===
On 8 August 2022, Thiago joined Sham Shui Po.

=== HKFC ===
On 17 January 2023, Thiago joined HKFC.

== Career statistics ==
=== Club ===
As of 20 June 2019.

Club	Season	League			State League		Cup		Other		Total	
Club	Season	Division	Apps	Goals	Apps	Goals	Apps	Goals	Apps	Goals	Apps	Goals
Rio Branco-SP	2010	–			1 (Note: Appearances in the Campeonato Paulista)	0	0	0	0	0	1	0
Rio Branco-SP	2011	–			1 (Note: Appearances in the Campeonato Paulista A2)	0	0	0	0	0	1	0
Rio Branco-SP	Total		0	0	2	0	0	0	0	0	2	0
Itaboraí	2014	–			4 (Note: Appearances in the Campeonato Carioca A3)	0	0	0	0	0	4	0
Monte Carlo	2015	Liga de Elite	17	13	–		4 (Note: Appearances in the Taça de Macau)	8	0	0	21	21
Managua	2016–17	Liga Primera de Nicaragua	14	4	–		0	0	0	0	14	4
Ka I	2019	Liga de Elite	13	7	–		1	3	0	0	14	10
Career total			44	24	6	0	5	11	0	0	55	35
