= Wong Wai Kwok =

Hong Kong footballer

Personal information
- Full name: Wong Wai Kwok
- Date of birth: 20 May 1999 (age 27)
- Place of birth: Hong Kong
- Height: 1.67 m (5 ft 6 in)
- Position: Left winger

Youth career
- 2012–2015: Tsuen Wan
- 2015–2016: Rangers (HKG)

Senior career*
Years	Team	Apps	(Gls)
2016–2017	Kwai Tsing	20	(9)
2017–2023	Resources Capital	83	(23)
2023–2026	North District	47	(5)
- * Club domestic league appearances and goals as of 16 May 2026

Wong Wai Kwok (Chinese: 黃偉國; born 20 May 1999) is a former Hong Kong professional footballer who played as a left winger.

== Club career ==
On 15 July 2023, Wong joined North District.
