= Cheung Chun Hin =

Hong Kong footballer

Personal information
- Full name: Marco Cheung Chun Hin
- Date of birth: 7 January 1999 (age 27)
- Place of birth: Hong Kong
- Height: 1.77 m (5 ft 10 in)
- Position: Defender

Youth career
- 2012–2016: CFCSSHK

Senior career*
| Years | Team | Apps | (Gls) |
| 2016–2021 | Happy Valley | 59 | (2) |
| 2021–2023 | HK U23 | 10 | (0) |
| 2023–2024 | North District | 16 | (0) |
| 2024– | Central & Western | 45 | (2) |

International career^{‡}
| 2015 | Hong Kong U-16 | | |
| 2017 | Hong Kong U-19 | 2 | (0) |
| 2021 | Hong Kong U-22 | 2 | (0) |
- * Club domestic league appearances and goals as of 26 May 2024 ‡ National team caps and goals as of 28 October 2021

Marco Cheung Chun Hin (Chinese: 張俊軒; born 7 January 1999) is a former Hong Kong professional footballer who played as a defender.

== Club career ==
On 13 July 2023, Cheung joined North District.
