= Law Hiu Chung =

Hong Kong footballer

Law Hiu Chung 羅曉聰
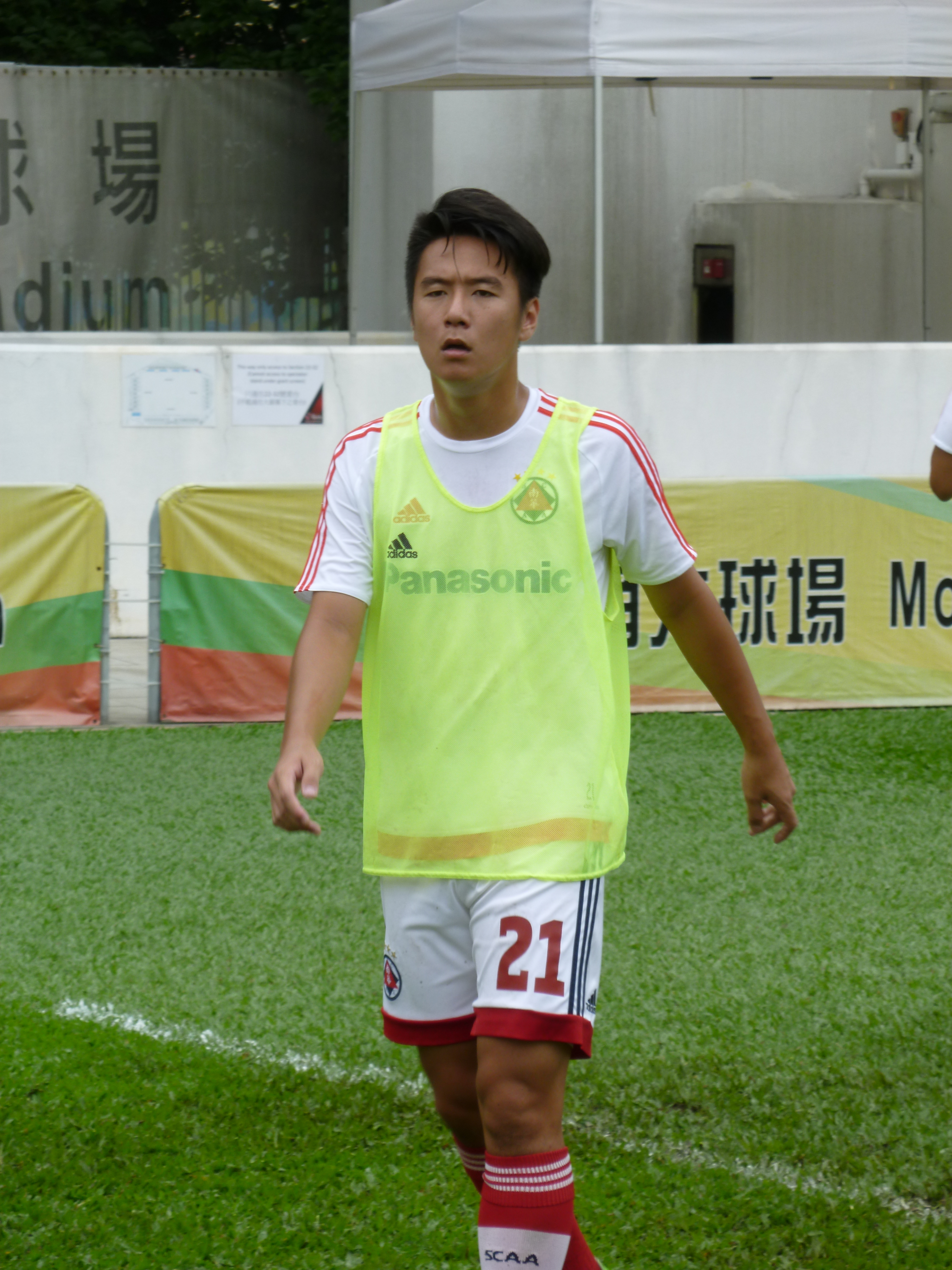

Personal information
- Full name: Law Hiu Chung
- Date of birth: 10 June 1995 (age 31)
- Place of birth: Hong Kong
- Height: 1.73 m (5 ft 8 in)
- Positions: Right midfielder; right back

Team information
- Current team: North District
- Number: 10

Youth career
- 2009–2010: Rangers (HKG)

Senior career*
Years	Team	Apps	(Gls)
2010–2012	Metro Gallery	6	(0)
2012–2014	Rangers (HKG)	28	(0)
2015–2017	South China	18	(0)
2017–2021	Pegasus	44	(0)
2021–2023	HK U23	17	(1)
2023–	North District	63	(1)

International career
2006	Hong Kong U-15		
2013–2018	Hong Kong U-22		
- * Club domestic league appearances and goals as of 20 November 2026

Law Hiu Chung (Chinese: 羅曉聰; born 10 June 1995) is a Hong Kong professional footballer who currently plays as a midfielder for Hong Kong Premier League club North District.

== Club career ==
In 2012, Law signed for Hong Kong First Division club Rangers.

In 2014, Law left Rangers for Hong Kong Premier League club South China. On 13 April 2016, Law scored his first goal for South China against Maldives club Maziya, which South China wins the match 2–0.

On 11 June 2017, Pegasus chairperson Canny Leung revealed that Law along with three other South China players would be jumping ship to Pegasus.

In September 2021, Law joined HK U23.

On 13 July 2023, Law joined North District.
