= Kai Bo Food Supermarket =

Hong Kong supermarket chain

- Company type: Private
- Industry: Retail
- Founded: 1991
- Founder: Lam Hiu-ngai
- Headquarters: Hong Kong
- Number of locations: 91 (2018)
- Area served: Hong Kong
- Parent: JD.com (70%)
- Website: Official website

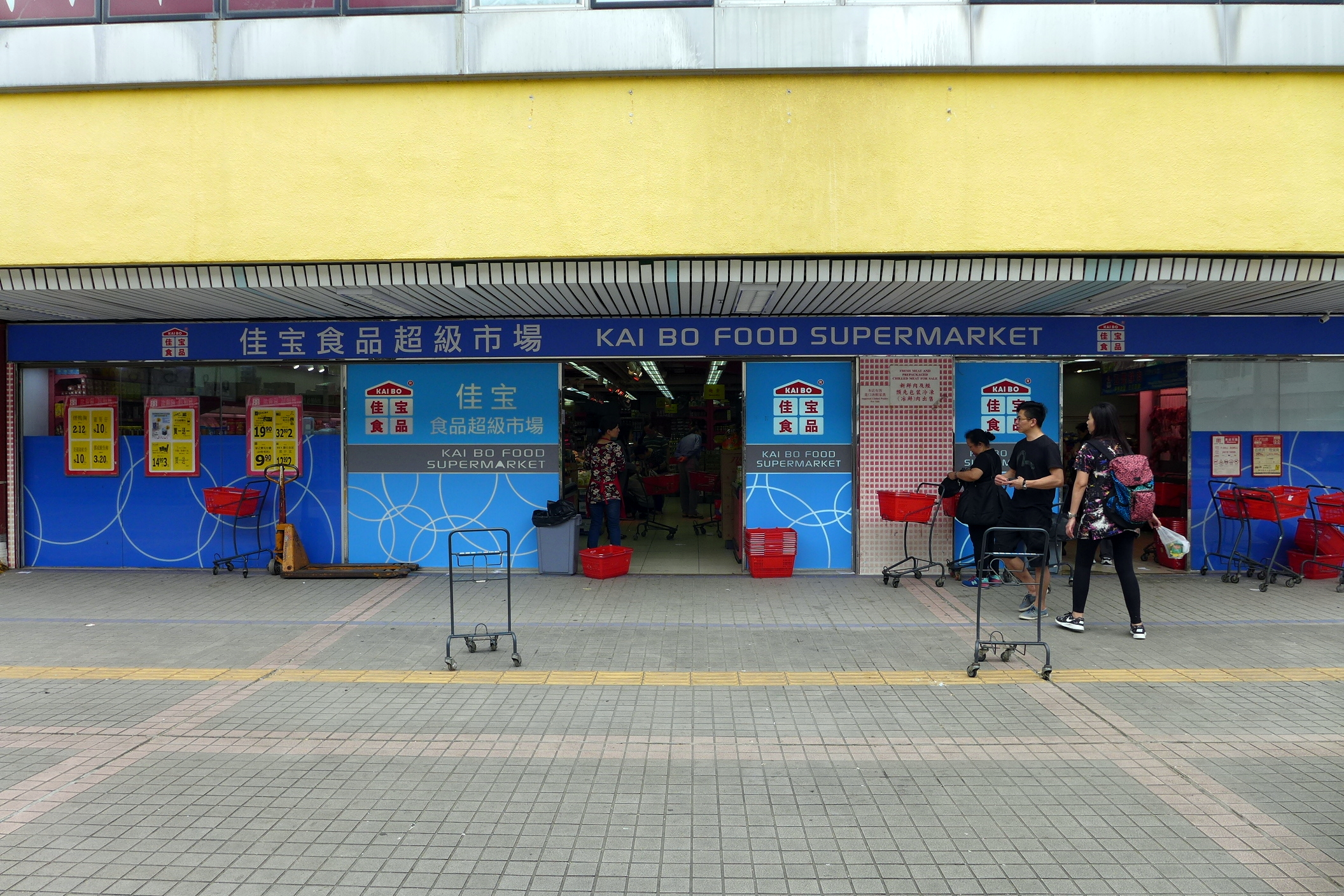
Kai Bo Food Supermarket in Lek Yuen Estate in 2016

Kai Bo Food Supermarket (Chinese: 佳宝食品超級市場) is a grocery shop chain in Hong Kong. It operates 91 supermarkets in Hong Kong as of August 2018, owning around 40% of its locations.

The company was founded by Lam Hiu-ngai and a friend in 1991 as Zaak Hing Meat Shop in a wet market in Shau Kei Wan. Lam opened the first Kai Bo Food Supermarket in 1997. Kai Bo focuses on the retail of food and food products, unlike other supermarket chains in Hong Kong which also sell household products. Kai Bo imports most of its vegetables and fruits from mainland China, and most of its meat products from South America and the United States. From 2015 to 2018, Lam spent close to HK$1.5 billion on property purchases, some for opening new Kai Bo branches and some for short-term investment.
