= Sun Ming Him =

Hong Kong footballer (born 2000)

Sun Ming Him 孫銘謙
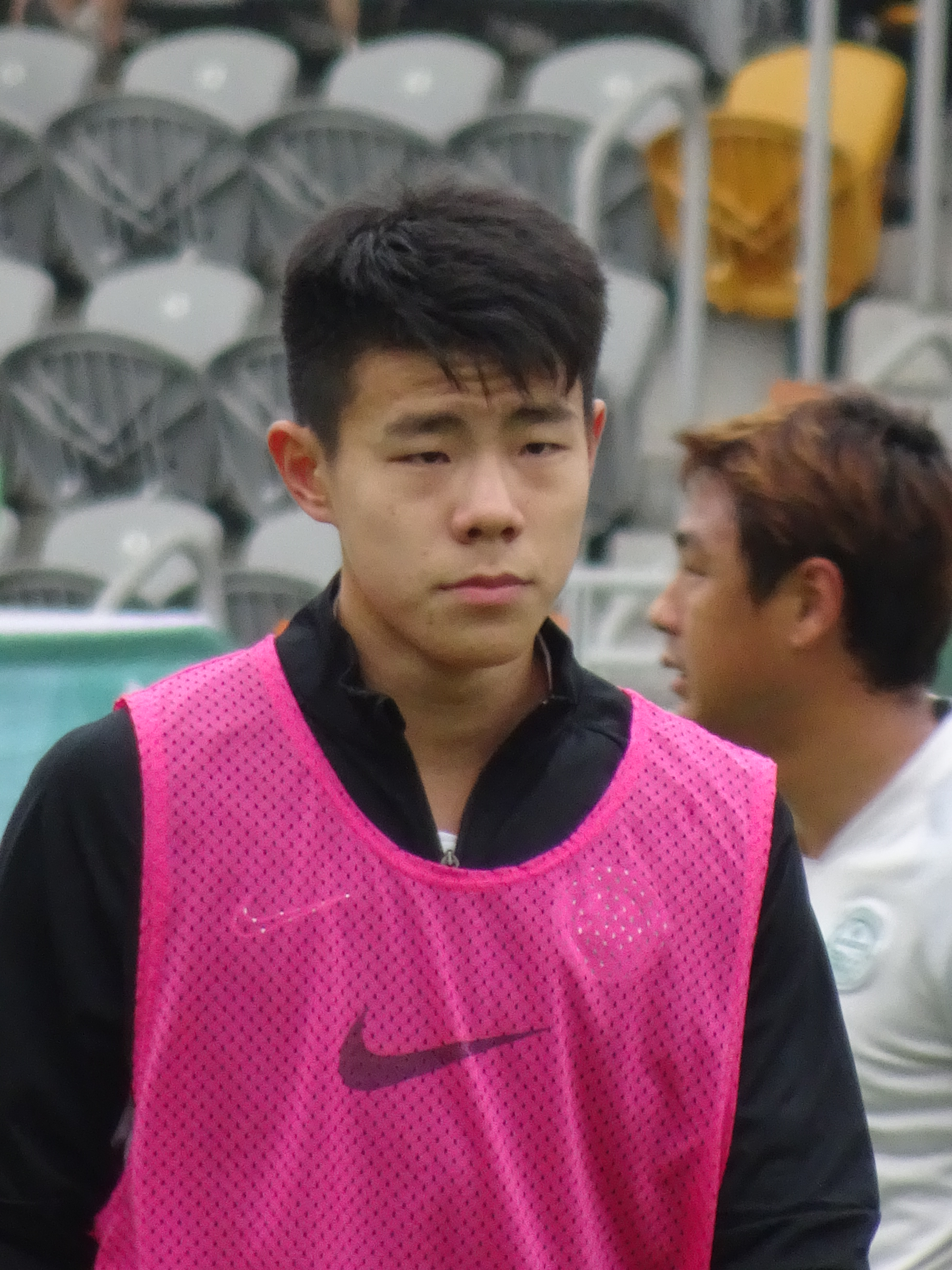

Personal information
- Full name: Sun Ming Him
- Date of birth: 19 June 2000 (age 26)
- Place of birth: Hong Kong
- Height: 1.78 m (5 ft 10 in)
- Positions: Left winger; left back; forward

Team information
- Current team: Tianjin Jinmen Tiger
- Number: 31

Youth career
- 2008–2017: Kitchee

Senior career*
Years	Team	Apps	(Gls)
2017–2019	Hoi King	29	(3)
2019–2020	Tai Po	9	(1)
2020–2021	Pegasus	17	(4)
2021–2024	Eastern	26	(11)
2024	Cangzhou Mighty Lions	27	(0)
2025–	Tianjin Jinmen Tiger	54	(1)

International career^{‡}
2015–2016	Hong Kong U-14	10	(4)
2015–2016	Hong Kong U-16	2	(0)
2017	Hong Kong U-18	5	(1)
2019	Hong Kong U-23	2	(0)
2019–	Hong Kong	48	(3)
Medal record
Men's football
Representing Hong Kong
FIFA ASEAN Challenge Cup
Winner	2026 Hong Kong
- * Club domestic league appearances and goals as of 8 November 2026 ‡ National team caps and goals as of 3 October 2026

Sun Ming Him (Chinese: 孫銘謙; born 19 June 2000) is a Hong Kong professional footballer who currently plays as a left winger or a left back for Chinese Super League club Tianjin Jinmen Tiger and the Hong Kong national team.

== Early career ==
In July 2016, Sun was selected and sent abroad to receive training at Bayern Munich.

== Club career ==
=== Tai Po ===
While playing for Tai Po, Sun became the youngest-ever Hong Kong Premier League’s monthly Most Valuable Player in February 2020.

=== Peagsus ===
On 17 October 2020, it was revealed that Sun had joined Pegasus.

=== Eastern ===
On 26 August 2021, Sun joined Eastern.

In the 2022–23 season, Sun scored 14 goals and became the top scorer among local players in all local competitions in Hong Kong. Sun also became one of the Hong Kong Top Footballers and Young Players of the Year in the Hong Kong Top Footballer Awards.

=== Cangzhou Mighty Lions ===
On 29 February 2024, Sun joined Chinese Super League club Cangzhou Mighty Lions for an undisclosed fee.

=== Tianjin Jinmen Tiger ===
On 6 January 2025, Sun joined another CSL club Tianjin Jinmen Tiger.

== International career ==
Sun made his international debut against Chinese Taipei on 11 June 2019 at the age of 18.

Sun scored his first international goal against Cambodia on 11 June 2022.

On 26 December 2023, Sun was named in Hong Kong's squad for the 2023 AFC Asian Cup.

== Career statistics ==
=== Club ===
As of 2 December 2024

Club	Season	League			National Cup		Other Cups		Continental		Other		Total	
Club	Season	Division	Apps	Goals	Apps	Goals	Apps	Goals	Apps	Goals	Apps	Goals	Apps	Goals
Hoi King	2017–18	Hong Kong First Division	14	2	0	0	0	0	0	0	0	0	14	2
Hoi King	2018–19	Hong Kong Premier League	15	1	1 (Note: Appearances in the FA Cup)	0	2 (Note: Appearances in the Sapling Cup)	0	0	0	0	0	18	1
Tai Po	2019–20	Hong Kong Premier League	9	1	3	0	6	2	1 (Note: Appearances in the AFC Champions League qualification)	0	2 (Note: Appearances in the Senior Shield)	0	21	3
Pegasus	2020–21	Hong Kong Premier League	17	4	0	0	6	0	0	0	0	0	23	4
Eastern	2021–22	Hong Kong Premier League	4	1	1	0	9	7	2 (Note: Appearances in the AFC Cup)	1	0	0	16	9
Eastern	2022–23	Hong Kong Premier League	18	8	2	1	9	4	0	0	3	1	32	14
Eastern	2023–24	Hong Kong Premier League	4	2	1	0	1	0	0	0	1	0	7	2
Cangzhou Mighty Lions	2024	Chinese Super League	27	0	0	0	–		–		–		27	0
Career total			108	19	8	1	33	13	3	1	6	1	158	35

=== International ===
As of 3 October 2026

National team	Year	Apps	Goals
Hong Kong	2019	4	0
Hong Kong	2020	0	0
Hong Kong	2021	2	0
Hong Kong	2022	9	2
Hong Kong	2023	8	0
Hong Kong	2024	9	0
Hong Kong	2025	10	0
Hong Kong	2026	6	1
Total		48	3

#	Date	Venue	Opponent	Result	Competition
2019
1	11 June 2019	Mong Kok Stadium, Hong Kong	Chinese Taipei	0–2	Friendly
2	5 September 2019	Phnom Penh Olympic Stadium, Phnom Penh, Cambodia	Cambodia	1–1	2022 FIFA World Cup qualification – AFC second round
3	14 November 2019	Hong Kong Stadium, Hong Kong	Bahrain	0–0	2022 FIFA World Cup qualification – AFC second round
4	14 December 2019	Busan Gudeok Stadium, Busan, South Korea	Japan	0–5	2019 EAFF E-1 Football Championship
2021
5	3 June 2021	Al Muharraq Stadium, Arad, Bahrain	Iran	1–3	2022 FIFA World Cup qualification – AFC second round
6	11 June 2021	Al Muharraq Stadium, Arad, Bahrain	Iraq	0–1	2022 FIFA World Cup qualification – AFC second round
2022
7	1 June 2022	National Stadium Bukit Jalil, Kuala Lumpur, Malaysia	Malaysia	0–2	Friendly
8	8 June 2022	Salt Lake Stadium, Kolkata, India	Afghanistan	2–1	2023 AFC Asian Cup qualification – third round
9	11 June 2022	Salt Lake Stadium, Kolkata, India	Cambodia	3–0	2023 AFC Asian Cup qualification – third round
10	14 June 2022	Salt Lake Stadium, Kolkata, India	India	0–4	2023 AFC Asian Cup qualification – third round
11	19 July 2022	Kashima Stadium, Kashima, Japan	Japan	0–6	2022 EAFF E-1 Football Championship
12	24 July 2022	Toyota Stadium, Toyota, Japan	South Korea	0–3	2022 EAFF E-1 Football Championship
13	27 July 2022	Toyota Stadium, Toyota, Japan	China	0–1	2022 EAFF E-1 Football Championship
14	21 September 2022	Mong Kok Stadium, Mong Kok, Hong Kong	Myanmar	2–0	Friendly
15	24 September 2022	Hong Kong Stadium, So Kon Po, Hong Kong	Myanmar	0–0	Friendly
2023
16	23 March 2023	Mong Kok Stadium, Mong Kok, Hong Kong	Singapore	1–1	Friendly
17	28 March 2023	Sultan Ibrahim Stadium, Johor, Malaysia	Malaysia	0–2	Friendly
18	15 June 2023	Lạch Tray Stadium, Hai Phong, Hong Kong	Vietnam	0–1	Friendly
19	19 June 2023	Hong Kong Stadium, So Kon Po, Hong Kong	Thailand	0–1	Friendly
20	7 September 2023	Phnom Penh Olympic Stadium, Phnom Penh, Cambodia	Cambodia	1–1	Friendly
21	11 September 2023	Hong Kong Stadium, So Kon Po, Hong Kong	Brunei	10–0	Friendly
22	12 October 2023	Hong Kong Stadium, So Kon Po, Hong Kong	Bhutan	4–0	2026 FIFA World Cup qualification – AFC first round
23	17 October 2023	Changlimithang Stadium, Thimphu, Bhutan	Bhutan	0–2	2026 FIFA World Cup qualification – AFC first round
2024
24	19 January 2024	Khalifa International Stadium, Al Rayyan, Qatar	Iran	0–1	2023 AFC Asian Cup
25	23 January 2024	Abdullah bin Khalifa Stadium, Doha, Qatar	Palestine	0–3	2023 AFC Asian Cup
26	21 March 2024	Mong Kok Stadium, Mong Kok, Hong Kong	Uzbekistan	0–2	2026 FIFA World Cup qualification – AFC second round
27	26 March 2024	Milliy Stadium, Tashkent, Uzbekistan	Uzbekistan	0–3	2026 FIFA World Cup qualification – AFC second round
28	8 September 2024	Churchill Park, Lautoka, Fiji	Fiji	1–1	Friendly
29	10 October 2024	Rheinpark Stadion, Vaduz, Liechtenstein	Liechtenstein	0–1	Friendly
30	15 October 2024	Hong Kong Stadium, So Kon Po, Hong Kong	Cambodia	3–0	Friendly
31	14 November 2024	Hong Kong Stadium, So Kon Po, Hong Kong	Philippines	3–1	Friendly
32	19 November 2024	Mong Kok Stadium, Mong Kok, Hong Kong	Mauritius	1–0	Friendly
2025
33	19 March 2025	Mong Kok Stadium, Mong Kok, Hong Kong	Macau	2–0	Friendly
34	25 March 2025	National Stadium, Singapore	Singapore	0–0	2027 AFC Asian Cup qualification – third round
35	5 June 2025	Hong Kong Stadium, So Kon Po, Hong Kong	Nepal	0–0	Friendly
36	10 June 2025	Kai Tak Stadium, Kai Tak, Hong Kong	India	1–0	2027 AFC Asian Cup qualification – third round

=== International goals ===
Scores and results list Hong Kong's goal tally first, score column indicates score after each Sun Ming Him goal.

List of international goals scored by Sun Ming Him
No	Date	Cap	Venue	Opponent	Score	Result	Competition
1.	11 June 2022	9	Salt Lake Stadium, Kolkata, India	Cambodia	2–0	3–0	2023 AFC Asian Cup qualification – third round
2.	21 September 2022	14	Mong Kok Stadium, Mong Kok, Hong Kong	Myanmar	1–0	2–0	Friendly
3.	27 September 2026	46	Kai Tak Stadium, Kowloon, Hong Kong	Laos	1–0	4–0	2026 FIFA ASEAN Challenge Cup

== Honours ==
Hong Kong

- FIFA ASEAN Challenge Cup: 2026
