= Felipe Sá =

Brazilian footballer (born 1995)

Personal information
- Full name: Felipe Alexandre Gonçalves de Sá
- Date of birth: 29 May 1995 (age 31)
- Place of birth: São José dos Campos, Brazil
- Height: 1.69 m (5 ft 7 in)
- Position: Forward

Team information
- Current team: Eastern
- Number: 11

Youth career
- –2012: Osasco Audax
- 2013–2014: Gavà

Senior career*
Years	Team	Apps	(Gls)
2014–2016	Sant Andreu	20	(4)
2016–2017	Alcorcón B	16	(0)
2017–2018	Granollers	13	(4)
2018–2020	Sant Andreu	48	(6)
2020–2023	Resources Capital	31	(13)
2023–2024	Al-Fujairah		
2024–	Eastern	34	(2)
- * Club domestic league appearances and goals as of 17 October 2026

Felipe Alexandre Gonçalves de Sá (born 29 May 1995), commonly known as Felipe Sá, is a Brazilian professional footballer who currently plays as a forward for Hong Kong Premier League club Eastern.

== Club career ==
On 30 January 2020, Sá signed for Hong Kong First Division side Resources Capital.

In the summer of 2023, Sá left Resources Capital at the end of their contract. He moved to Emirati club Al-Fujairah.

On 26 August 2024, Sá returned to Hong Kong and joined Eastern.

== Career statistics ==
=== Club ===
As of 7 May 2023.

Club	Season	League			National Cup		Continental		Other		Total	
Club	Season	Division	Apps	Goals	Apps	Goals	Apps	Goals	Apps	Goals	Apps	Goals
Sant Andreu	2014–15	Segunda División B	16	1	0	0	—		0	0	16	1
Sant Andreu	2015–16	Tercera División	4	3	0	0	—		0	0	4	3
Sant Andreu	Total		20	4	0	0	—		0	0	20	4
Alcorcón B	2016–17	Tercera División	16	0	0	0	—		0	0	16	0
Granollers	2017–18	Tercera División	13	4	0	0	—		0	0	13	4
Sant Andreu	2018–19	Tercera División	33	6	3 (Note: Appearances in the Copa del Rey)	1	—		2 (Note: Appearances in the Copa Catalunya)	0	38	7
Sant Andreu	2019–20	Tercera División	15	0	0	0	—		2	0	17	0
Sant Andreu	Total		48	6	3	1	—		4	0	55	7
Resources Capital	2020–21	Hong Kong Premier League	13	6	0	0	—		3 (Note: Appearances in the Hong Kong Sapling Cup)	2	16	8
Resources Capital	2021–22	Hong Kong Premier League	2	0	1	0	—		0	0	3	0
Resources Capital	2022–23	Hong Kong Premier League	16	7	1	0	—		7 (Note: Six appearances in the Hong Kong Sapling Cup, one appearance in Hong Kong Senior Challenge Shield)	4 (Note: Three goals in the Hong Kong Sapling Cup, one goal in Hong Kong Senior Challenge Shield)	24	11
Resources Capital	Total		31	13	2	0	—		10	6	43	19
Eastern	2024–25	Hong Kong Premier League	4	0	0	0	4	0	3 (Note: Two appearances in the Hong Kong Senior Challenge Shield, one appearance in the Hong Kong Sapling Cup)	0	11	0
Career total			132	27	5	1	4	0	17	6	158	34

== Honours ==
Sant Andreu

- Copa Catalunya: 2018–19

Eastern

- Hong Kong Senior Shield: 2024–25
- Hong Kong FA Cup: 2024–25
