= Chan Hiu Fung =

Hong Kong footballer

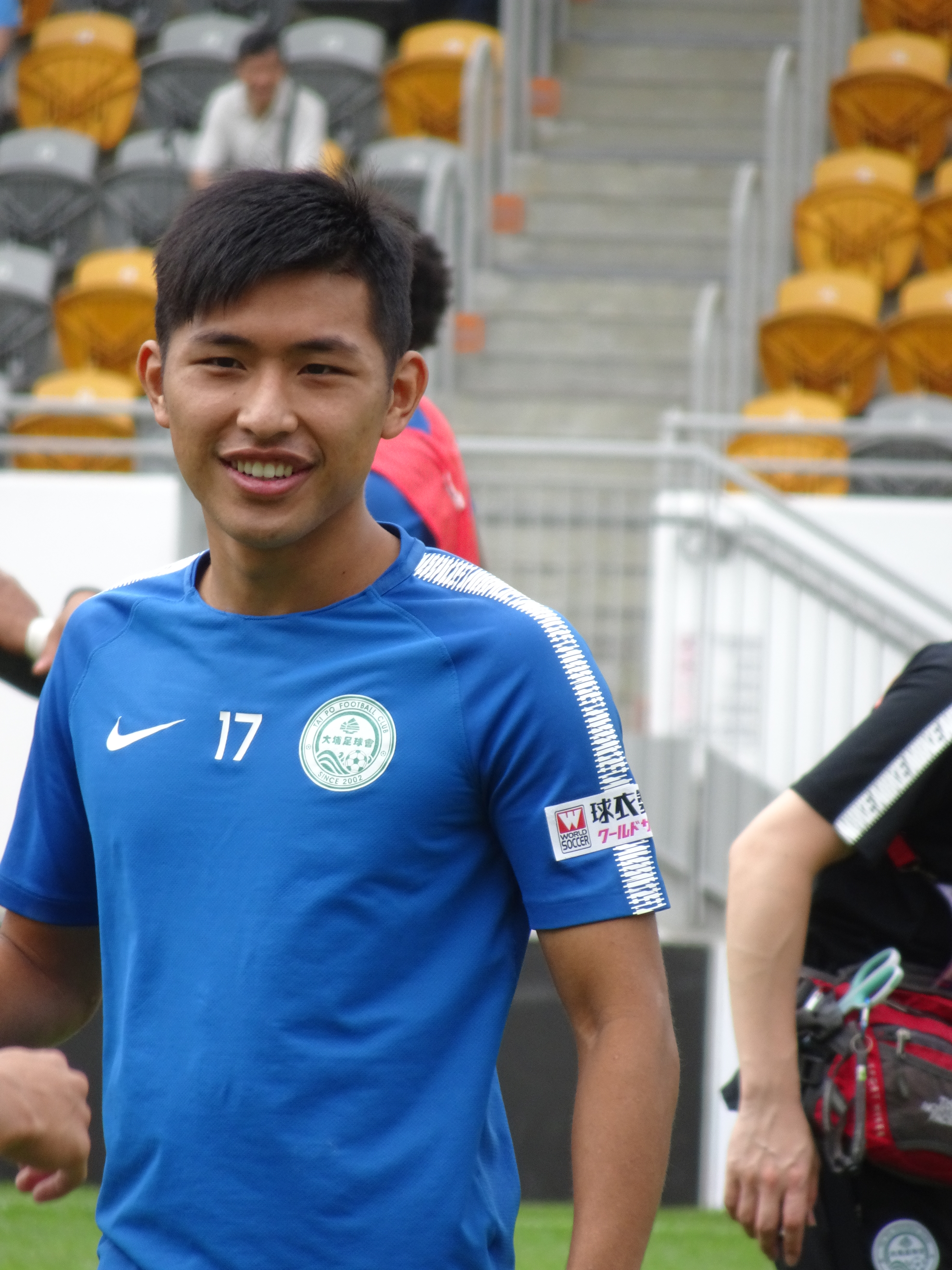

Personal information
- Full name: Alex Chan Hiu Fung
- Date of birth: 8 December 1994 (age 31)
- Place of birth: Hong Kong
- Height: 1.72 m (5 ft 8 in)
- Position: Midfielder

Youth career
- 2010–2011: Sun Hei
- 2011–2012: Tai Po

Senior career*
Years	Team	Apps	(Gls)
2012–2015	Eastern District	19	(8)
2015–2019	Tai Po	35	(6)
2018–2019	→ Yuen Long (loan)	16	(2)
2019–2021	Pegasus	15	(0)
2021–2024	Tai Po	35	(13)
2024–2025	Central & Western District	15	(0)
2025–	WSE	21	(7)
- * Club domestic league appearances and goals as of 7 February 2024

Alex Chan Hiu Fung (Chinese: 陳曉鋒, born 8 December 1994) is a former Hong Kong professional footballer who played as a midfielder.
