= Jesús González (footballer, born 1994) =

Spanish footballer

Personal information
- Full name: Jesús González Díaz
- Date of birth: 7 January 1994 (age 32)
- Place of birth: Seville, Spain
- Height: 1.82 m (6 ft 0 in)
- Position: Centre back

Youth career
- Gilena
- 2004–2013: Sevilla

Senior career*
Years	Team	Apps	(Gls)
2013–2015	Sevilla C	82	(3)
2015–2016	Mérida	24	(0)
2016–2017	Getafe B	19	(2)
2017	Getafe	1	(0)
2017–2018	Zaragoza B	23	(1)
2018–2019	Atlético Astorga	30	(1)
2019–2020	Ciudad de Lucena	22	(0)
2020–2022	Coria	18	(0)
2022	Franklin Pierce Ravens		
2023	Sham Shui Po	9	(0)
- * Club domestic league appearances and goals as of 31 May 2023

Jesús González Díaz (born 7 January 1994), sometimes known as just Jesús, is a Spanish professional footballer who plays as a centre back and is currently a free agent.

== Club career ==
Born in Seville, Andalusia, Gonzalez joined Sevilla FC's youth setup in 2004 at the age of ten. He made his senior debut with the club's C-team on 3 February 2013, starting in a 0–2 Tercera División away loss against Atlético de Ceuta.

In August 2015 Gonzalez moved to Segunda División B club Mérida AD, becoming a regular starter for the side. On 27 August of the following year he signed for another reserve team, Getafe CF B in the fourth tier.

Gonzalez made his first team debut on 25 February 2017, starting in a 1–0 home win against Rayo Vallecano in the Segunda División. On 24 July he moved to another reserve team, Deportivo Aragón in the third level.

On 11 January 2023, Gonzalez joined Sham Shui Po.
