= Hammer Hill Road Sports Ground =

Stadium in Diamond Hill, Kowloon, Hong Kong

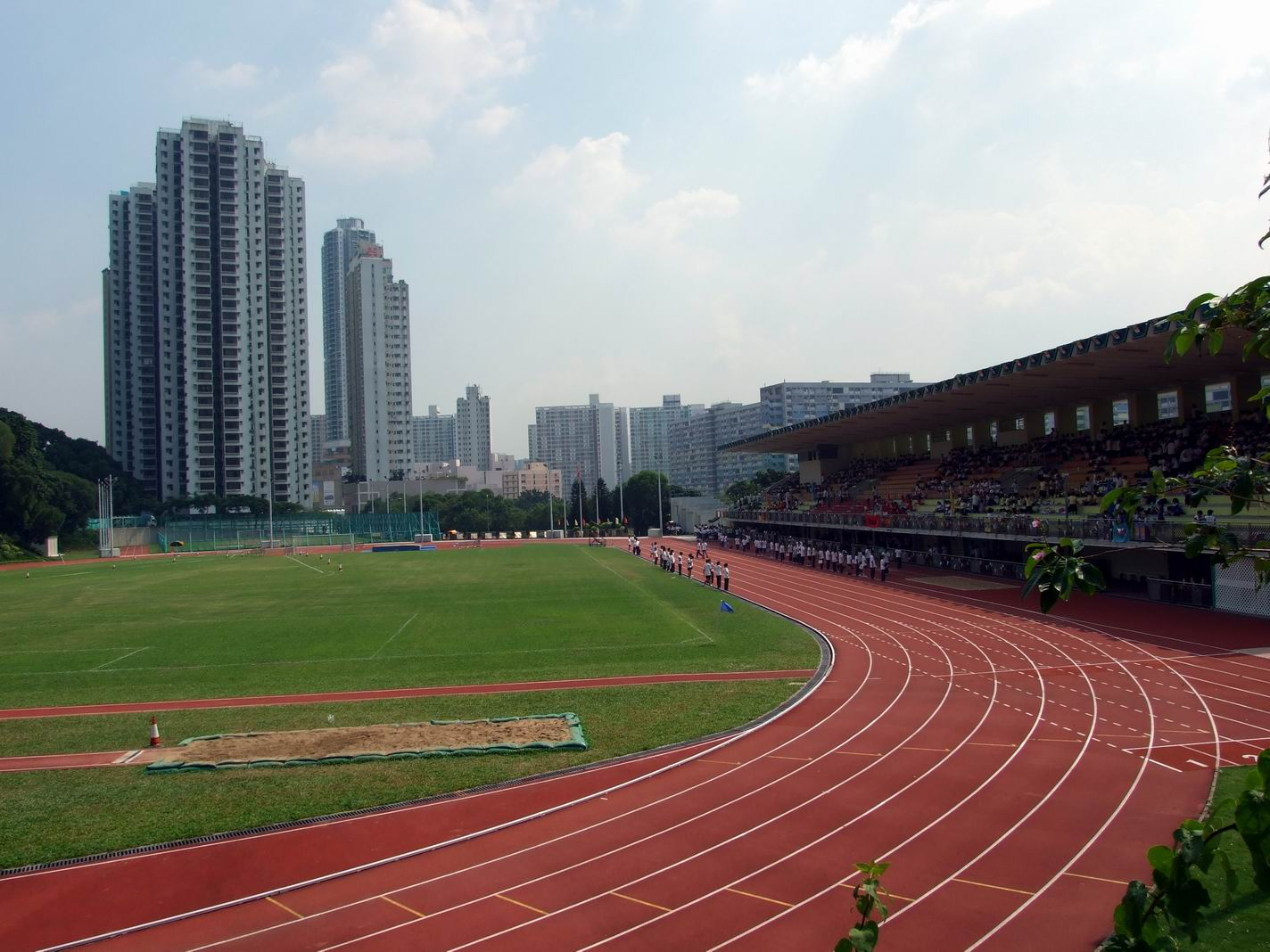
- Interactive map of Hammer Hill Road Sports Ground
- Address: 158 Hammer Hill Road, Diamond Hill, Hong Kong
- Coordinates: 22.3385°N 114.2075°E
- Owner: Hong Kong Government
- Operator: Leisure and Cultural Services Department
- Capacity: 2,200
- Surface: Grass
- Pitch size: 96 x 63 metres (105 x 69 yards)
- Public transit: Diamond Hill station Choi Hung station

Construction
- Opened: September 1989; 37 years ago

Tenants
- Happy Valley (2019–2020); Rangers (2020–21, 2022–23); HK U23 (2023–2024); Sha Tin (2026)

Hammer Hill Road Sports Ground (Chinese: 斧山道運動場) is a multi-purpose sports ground situated in Diamond Hill, Hong Kong.

The sports ground comprises one running track (8 lanes, 1400m), 1 turf football pitch with floodlights, 1 small football pitch with floodlights, 1 covered spectator stand with a seating capacity of 2200, 1 car park with 7 parking spaces, 1 fast food kiosk and 3 changing rooms and toilets (for males, females and referees respectively).
