= HK U23 Football Team =

HK U23
- Full name: HK U23 Football Team
- Nickname: Young Dragon
- Founded: 2 September 2021; 5 years ago
- Dissolved: 26 May 2024; 2 years ago
Home colours	Away colours

The Hong Kong U23 Football Team (Chinese: 香港U23足球隊) was a Hong Kong professional football team managed by the Hong Kong Football Association. Mainly formed by U23 local players, the team once competed in the Hong Kong Premier League. They were dissolved after the end of the 2023–24 season.

== History ==
Following the withdrawals of Pegasus and Happy Valley from the 2021–22 HKPL season, the Hong Kong Football Association announced in August 2021 that a new HKPL team mainly formed by U23 local players will be established.

On 2 September 2021, the HKFA confirmed the establishment of HK U23. The team's operation will be maintained for at least three years and no foreign players are allowed to be registered in the team. Meanwhile, the number of overaged players is restricted to five for the team, with no more than three on the pitch during matches. The rest of the players must meet the registration status of U23 local players.

Ahead of the 2022–23 season, the club announced that they would move across town from Tsing Yi Sports Ground to Tseung Kwan O Sports Ground.

Starting from the 2023–24 season, the number of overaged players allowed to play on the pitch during matches is changed from three to five.

On 25 May 2024, the club announced that they would be dissolved after the end of the 2023–24 season.

== Season-to-season record ==
Season	Tier	Division	Teams	Position	Home stadium	Attendance/G	FA Cup	Senior Shield	Sapling Cup
2021–22	1	Premier League	8	Cancelled	Tsing Yi Sports Ground	260	Cancelled due to COVID-19 pandemic		
2022–23	1	Premier League	10	10	Tseung Kwan O Sports Ground	275	First round	Quarter-finals	Group stage
2023–24	1	Premier League	11	10	Hammer Hill Road Sports Ground	215	First round	First round	Group stage

Note:

1st or Champions 2nd or Runner-up 3rd place Promotion Relegation

== Head coaches ==
- (Hong Kong) Cheung Kin Fung (2021–2022)
- (Hong Kong) Szeto Man Chun (2022–2024)

== See also ==
- Hong Kong national under-23 football team
