= Manuel Gavilán (Spanish footballer) =

Spanish footballer (born 1991)

Manu Gavilán
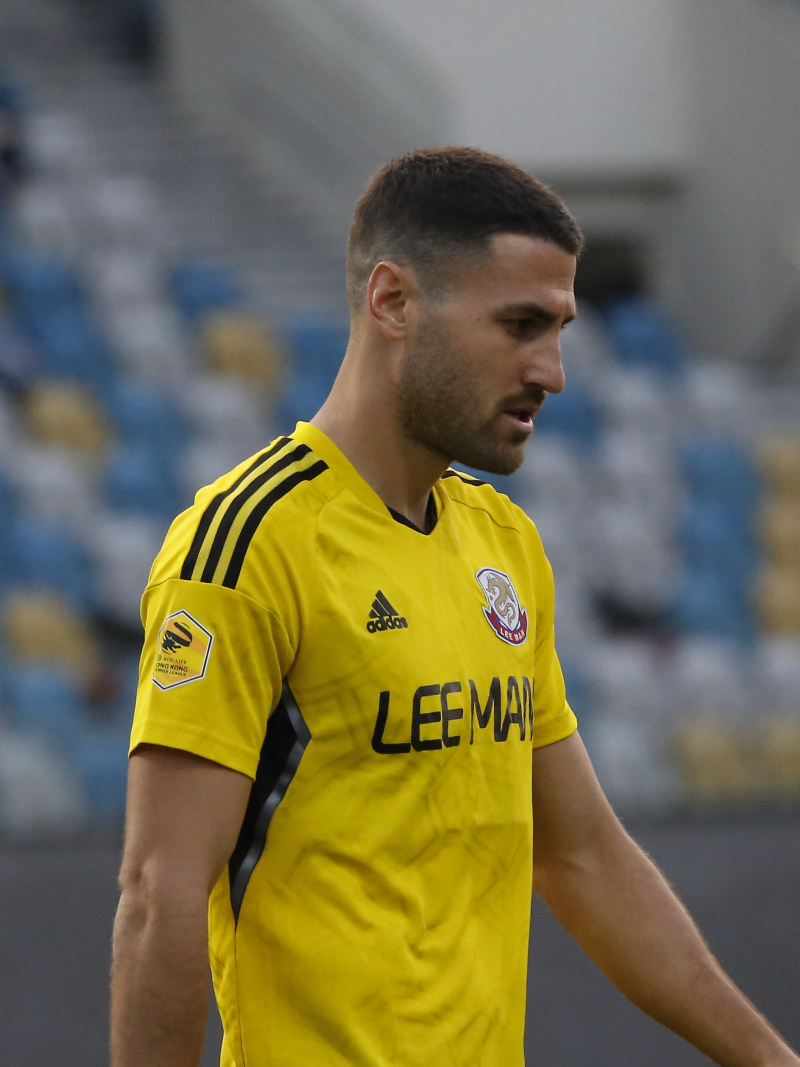
- Gavilán with Lee Man in 2023

Personal information
- Full name: Manuel Gavilán Morales
- Date of birth: 12 July 1991 (age 35)
- Place of birth: Seville, Spain
- Height: 1.80 m (5 ft 11 in)
- Position: Forward

Team information
- Current team: Atlético Central

Youth career
- Betis

Senior career*
Years	Team	Apps	(Gls)
2008–2010	Betis B	34	(6)
2010–2014	Bologna	0	(0)
2012	→ Piacenza (loan)	9	(2)
2012–2013	→ Nocerina (loan)	3	(0)
2013–2014	→ San Marino (loan)	22	(1)
2014–2015	Zamora	26	(8)
2015–2016	Ried	18	(0)
2016–2017	Eldense	18	(3)
2017–2018	Llagostera	30	(2)
2018	Guijuelo	16	(2)
2018–2019	Toledo	28	(13)
2019–2020	Happy Valley	8	(3)
2020–2022	Kitchee	21	(8)
2022–2023	Lee Man	14	(4)
2023–2025	Toledo	53	(16)
2025	Njarðvík	0	(0)
2025	→ Grindavík (loan)	8	(1)
2025–	Atlético Central	22	(4)

International career
2008	Spain U17	8	(2)
2009	Spain U18	2	(0)
2010	Spain U19	1	(0)
Medal record
Men's football
Representing Spain
UEFA European Under-17 Championship
Winner	2008 Türkiye
- * Club domestic league appearances and goals as of 19:53, 5 October 2026 (UTC)

Manuel 'Manu' Gavilán Morales (born 12 July 1991) is a Spanish professional footballer who plays as a forward for Segunda Federación club Atlético Central.

== Club career ==
Born in Seville, Andalusia, Gavilán graduated from Real Betis' youth system, and made his senior debut with the reserves in the 2008–09 season, in the Segunda División B. After attracting interest from Liverpool and other Premier League clubs, he joined Serie A's Bologna FC 1909 on 10 August 2010, for €350,000.

Gavilán played his first match as a professional on 18 January 2011, coming on as a substitute for Henry Giménez in the 77th minute of a 2–1 away loss against SSC Napoli in the round of 16 of the Coppa Italia. He subsequently served loans at fellow Italians Piacenza Calcio 1919, ASG Nocerina and San Marino Calcio, only appearing regularly with the latter; he was released in June 2014.

On 6 August 2014, Gavilán returned to Spain and signed a three-year deal with Zamora CF in the third tier. He scored his first goal for the team on 26 October, opening a 4–0 away win over Atlético Astorga FC.

In the following seasons, save for a brief spell in the Austrian Football Bundesliga with SV Ried, Gavilán continued to compete in the Spanish lower leagues, representing in quick succession CD Eldense, UE Llagostera, CD Guijuelo and CD Toledo. On 31 July 2019, after a two-week trial, he joined Hong Kong Premier League side Happy Valley AA, leaving on 28 May 2020 after it was decided his contract would not be renewed.

Gavilán signed with Kitchee SC of the same league on 1 June 2020. Two years later, he remained in the country's top flight on a contract at Lee Man FC.

In July 2023, Gavilán returned to Toledo, who now competed in the amateur Tercera Federación. He then took his game to the Icelandic second tier.

== Honours ==
Kitchee

- Hong Kong Premier League: 2019–20, 2020–21

Spain

- UEFA European Under-17 Championship: 2008
