= Tsing Yi Sports Ground =

Sports venue in Hong Kong

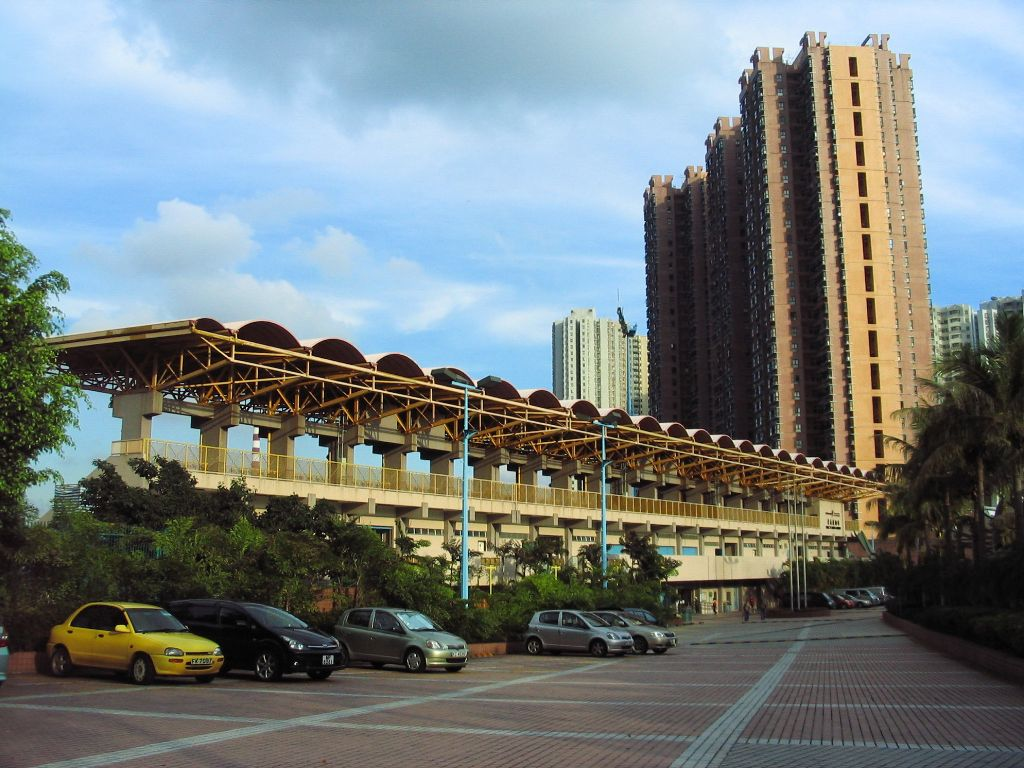
- Interactive map of Tsing Yi Sports Ground
- Location: 51 Tsing King Road, Tsing Yi, Hong Kong
- Coordinates: 22.3561°N 114.1075°E
- Owner: Hong Kong Government
- Operator: Leisure and Cultural Services Department
- Capacity: 1,500
- Surface: Grass
- Pitch size: 100 x 64 metres (110 x 70 yards)
- Public transit: Tsing Yi station

Construction
- Opened: 26 October 1996; 29 years ago
- Renovated: 2007; 19 years ago

Tenants
- Rangers (2000–01, 2011–12, 2016–17, 2023–); Resources Capital (2020–2024); Dreams (2017–19); Citizen (2013–14); Sun Hei (2009–11, 2013–14); Tuen Mun (2009)

Tsing Yi Sports Ground (Chinese: 青衣運動場) is a sports ground in Tsing Yi, New Territories, Hong Kong. It is located near the east coast of the island, between Tivoli Garden and Tsing Yi Swimming Pool. It is the home of Hong Kong Premier League club Rangers.

The stadium consists of a Tartan track and a football pitch.

== Opening hours ==
6:15 am to 10:30 pm every day. The pitch is closed for maintenance every Wednesday, however the track remains open for public use.

== Gallery ==
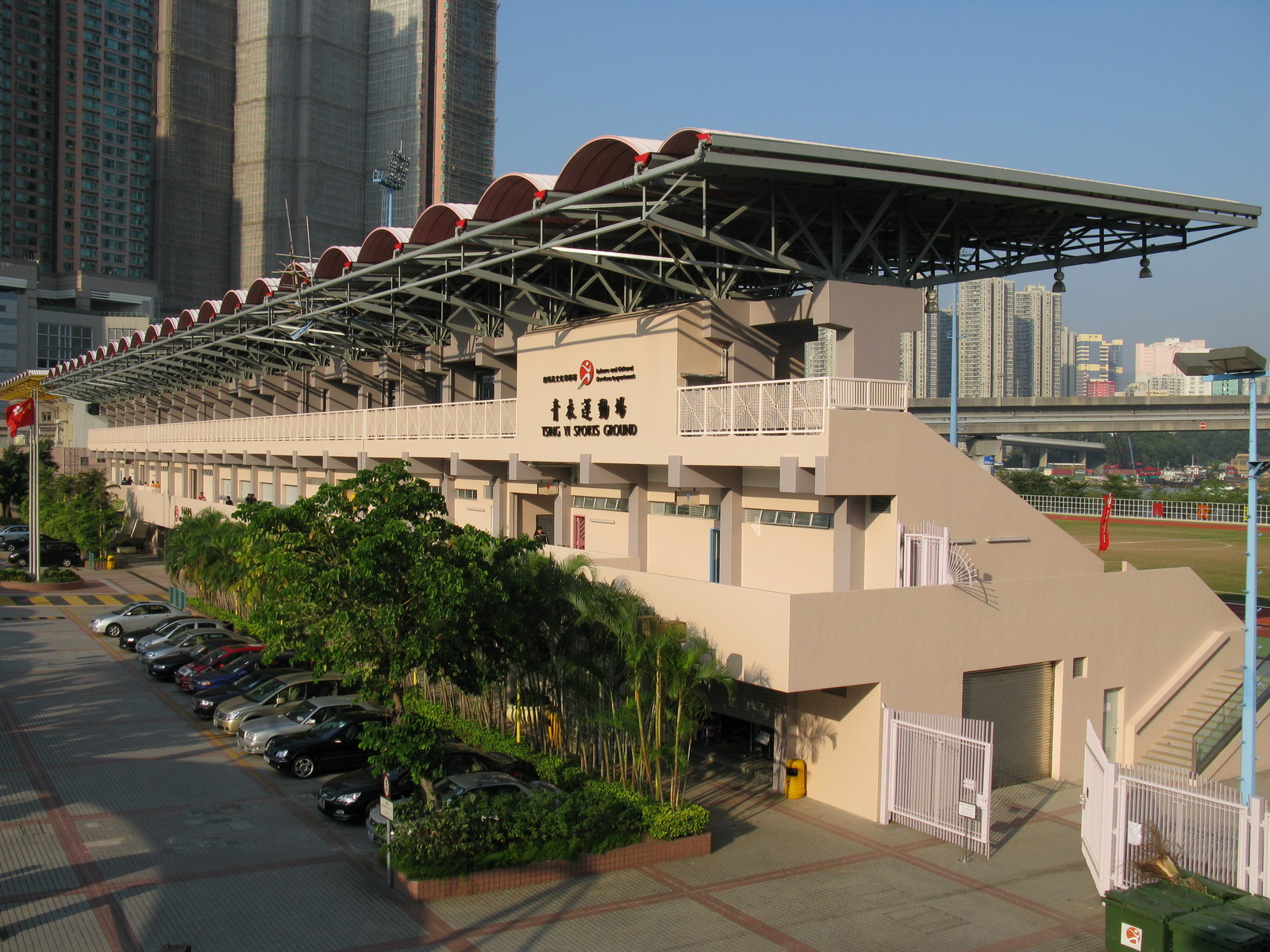
Entrance

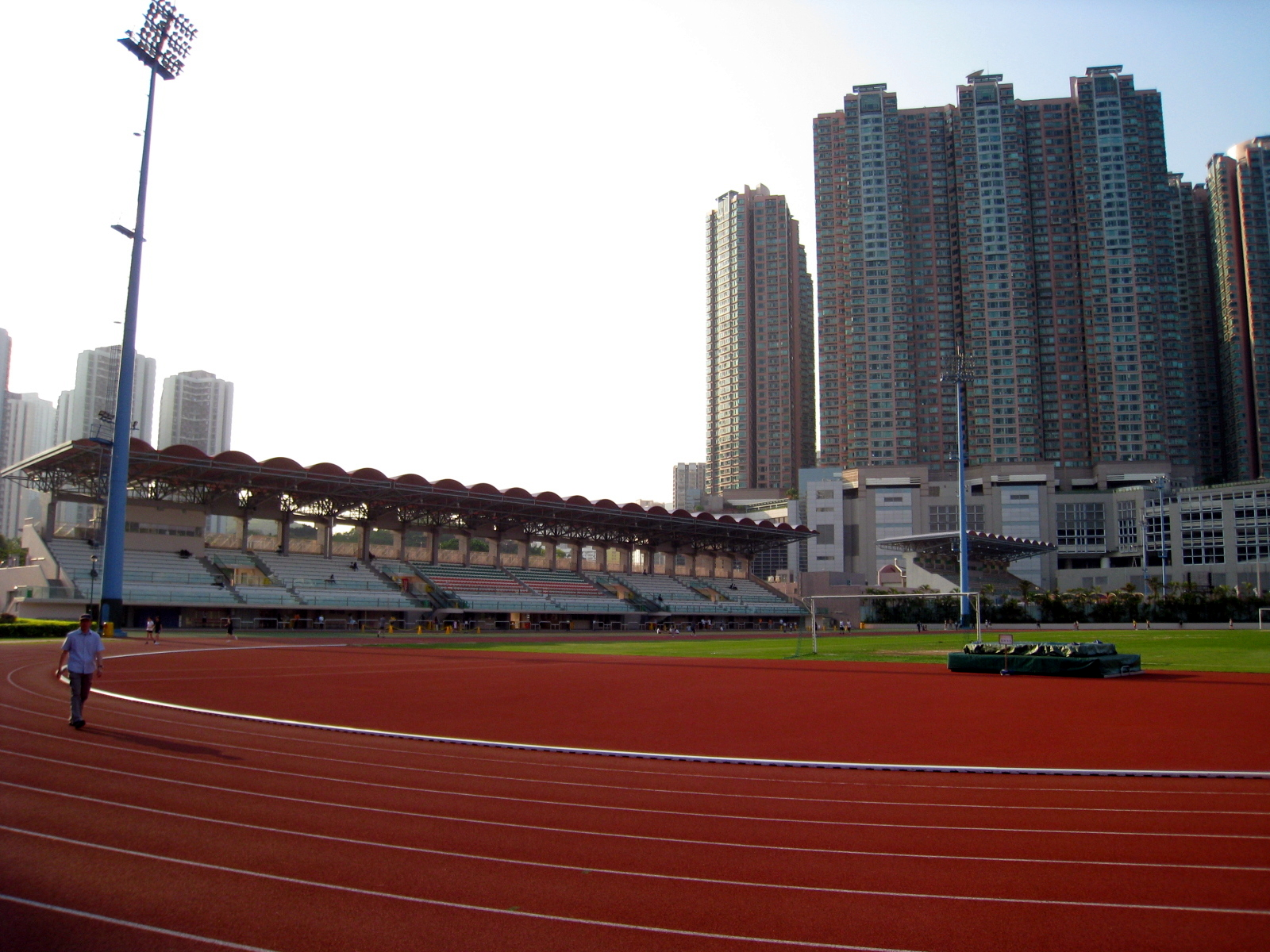
Track and grandstand

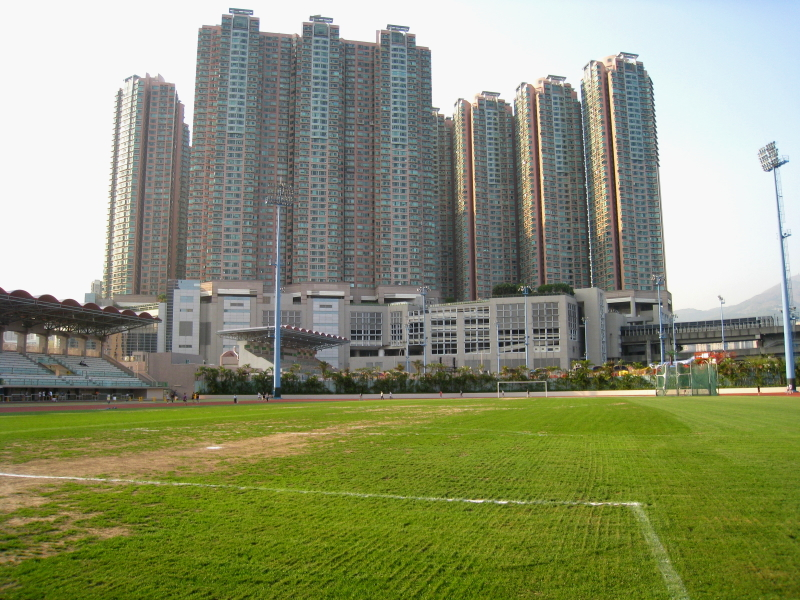
Football field
