= Resources Capital F.C. =

Resources Capital
- Full name: Resources Capital Football Club Limited
- Founded: 1982; 44 years ago as Tai Chung Publisher; 2016; 10 years ago as Resources Capital Football Club
- President: Hanson Wong
- Chairman: Henry Tang
- Head coach: Tai Sze Chung
- League: Hong Kong First Division League
- 2025–26: First Division, 10th of 14
- Website: https://www.facebook.com/RCFootballClub
Home colours	Away colours

Resources Capital Football Club (Chinese: 晉峰足球會) is a Hong Kong football club which currently competes in the Hong Kong First Division. It was formerly known as Tai Chung Football Club (Chinese: 大中足球會) for the first 34 years of its existence before rebranding in 2016.

== History ==
Tai Chung has competed in the Hong Kong football league system league since 2001. Between 2009 and 2011, Tai Chung once competed in the First Division, the top-flight league in Hong Kong at that time. Since their relegation in 2011, the club has competed in the second-tier amateur league.

In 2016, the club was acquired by Tang Wai Ho, and was renamed as Resources Capital.

Ahead of the 2019–20 season, club ownership increased the budget to $6 million and turned the club into a professional outfit, aiming to gain promotion to the Hong Kong Premier League in the following season. Despite the cancellation of the 2019–20 season due to the COVID-19 pandemic in Hong Kong, Resources Capital were granted promotion to the Hong Kong Premier League by the HKFA board of directors.

On 21 June 2024, the club announced that they would self-relegate into the First Division.

== Supporter groups ==
Resources Capital has a small supporters group active at all home and away games. The group was formed at the start of the 2020–21 Hong Kong Premier League season after the club grew in popularity among HKPL supporters. The fan group is known as "The Pink Army". At home games at Tsing Yi Sports Ground, "The Pink Army" was based at Zone H.

== Name history ==
- 1982–2005: Tai Chung (大中)
- 2005–2008: EU Tai Chung (東盟大中)
- 2008–2009: Advance Tai Chung (駿昇大中)
- 2009–2016: Tai Chung (大中)
- 2016–: Resources Capital (晉峰)

== Season-to-season record ==
Season	Tier	Division	Teams	Position	Home stadium	Attendance/G	FA Cup	Senior Shield	League Cup	Sapling Cup
2005–06	3	Third A Division		3			Did not enter	Did not enter	Did not enter	Not held
2006–07	3	Third A Division	20	2			Did not enter	Did not enter	Did not enter	Not held
2007–08	2	Second Division	10	7			Did not enter	Did not enter	Did not enter	Not held
2008–09	2	Second Division	10	2			Did not enter	Did not enter	Did not enter	Not held
2009–10	1	First Division	11	8	Kowloon Bay Sports Ground	353	First round	Quarter-finals	Not held	Not held
2010–11	1	First Division	10	9	Kowloon Bay Sports Ground	268	Quarter-finals	Quarter-finals	Quarter-finals	Not held
2011–12	2	Second Division	12	8			Did not enter	Did not enter	Did not enter	Not held
2012–13	2	Second Division	11	4			Did not enter	Did not enter	Not held	Not held
2013–14	2	Second Division	12	6			Did not enter	Did not enter	Not held	Not held
2014–15	2	First Division	15	13			Did not enter	Did not enter	Did not enter	Not held
2015–16	2	First Division	14	10			Did not enter	Did not enter	Did not enter	Did not enter
2016–17	2	First Division	14	9			Did not enter	Did not enter	Defunct	Did not enter
2017–18	2	First Division	16	9			Did not enter	Did not enter	Defunct	Did not enter
2018–19	2	First Division	14	7			Did not enter	Did not enter	Defunct	Did not enter
2019–20	2	First Division	14	Cancelled			Did not enter	Did not enter	Defunct	Did not enter
2020–21	1	Premier League	8	7	Tsing Yi Sports Ground	575	Cancelled due to COVID-19 pandemic		Defunct	Group stage
2021–22	1	Premier League	8	Cancelled	Tsing Yi Sports Ground	469	Cancelled due to COVID-19 pandemic		Defunct	Cancelled due to COVID-19 pandemic
2022–23	1	Premier League	10	8	Tsing Yi Sports Ground	524	First round	Quarter-finals	Defunct	Group stage
2023–24	1	Premier League	11	11	Tsing Yi Sports Ground	350	Quarter-finals	Quarter-finals	Defunct	Group stage

Note:

1st or Champions 2nd or Runners-up 3rd place Promotion Relegation

== Honours ==
=== League ===
- Hong Kong Third A Division
  - Champions (1): 2006–07

== Head coaches ==
- (Hong Kong) Chan Ho Yin (2009–2010)
- (Serbia) Dejan Antonić (2010–2011)
- (Hong Kong) Tim Bredbury (2012–2013)
- (Hong Kong) Yu Siu Chee (2013–2015)
- (Hong Kong) Ho Shun Yin (2015–2019)
- (Spain) Joan Esteva (2019–2022)
- (Hong Kong) Tang Kwun Yin (2022)
- (Hong Kong) Ho Shun Yin (2022)
- (Spain) Joan Esteva (2022–2023)
- (South Korea) Ha Hyeok-jun (2023–2024)
- (Hong Kong) Ho Shun Yin (2024)
- (Hong Kong) Tai Sze Chung (2024–)
