= 2026–27 Hong Kong League Cup =

15th edition of the Hong Kong League Cup

Tournament details
- Country: Hong Kong
- Dates: 26 September 2026 – 1 May 2027
- Teams: 11

Tournament statistics
- Matches played: 10
- Goals scored: 39 (3.9 per match)
- Attendance: 3,775 (378 per match)
- Top goal scorer: 4 players (3 each)
- All statistics correct as of 15 November 2026.

The 2026–27 Hong Kong League Cup is the 15th edition of the Hong Kong League Cup. 11 teams entered this edition. The competition was only open to teams that played in the 2026–27 Hong Kong Premier League.

Lee Man are the defending champions.

== Format ==
- All teams in the Hong Kong Premier League enter the competition, with no limitation on foreign players.
- Except the Final applies single knockout, other rounds apply double elimination, meaning teams will get a redemption opportunity after one defeat and will be eliminated after two defeats.
- Except in the Final where a draw after normal time will lead to 30-minute extra time and a draw after extra time will lead to a penalty shootout, for all other matches, a penalty shootout will follow right after a draw in normal time.

== Bracket ==
=== Advancement Group ===
First Round
4 October 2026
Rangers	1
Tai Po	3
4 October 2026
Kowloon City	1
Eastern District	2
26 September 2026
Eastern	3
Kitchee	1
1 October 2026
North District	2
Southern	1
1 October 2026
Sha Tin	2 (4)
HKFC (p)	2 (5)

Second Round
15 November 2026
Lee Man	2
Tai Po	1
15 November 2026
Eastern District	1
Eastern	0
14 November 2026
North District	4
HKFC	3

Third Round
5 December 2026; Match A9
Lee Man
Eastern District

Fourth Round
16–17 January 2027; Match A10
North District

=== Redemption Group ===
First Round
14 November 2026
Kowloon City	1
Kitchee	5
14 November 2026
Southern	2 (2)
Sha Tin (p)	2 (4)

Second Round
7 December 2026
Tai Po
Kitchee
5 December 2026
HKFC
Rangers
6 December 2026
Eastern
Sha Tin

Third Round
16–17 January 2027
Loser A9
16–17 January 2027

Fourth Round
28 March 2027
Loser A10

Fifth Round
21 April 2027

=== Final ===
Match	Advancement Group Winner	Score	Redemption Group Winner
Final			

== Fixtures and results ==
=== Advancement Group ===
==== First Round ====
26 September 2026	Eastern	3–1	Kitchee	Tai Po Sports Ground
16:00	Gondra 44'; Okubo 45+1', 45+4'	Report	Revilla 1'	Attendance: 429; Referee: Woo Chun Sing

1 October 2026	North District	2–1	Southern	Siu Sai Wan Sports Ground
16:00	Vinicius 59'; Granada 90+7'	Report	Golubović 90+3'	Attendance: 645; Referee: Tang Hing Fu

1 October 2026	Sha Tin	2–2 (4–5 p)	HKFC	Siu Sai Wan Sports Ground
19:00	Scott 12'; Lam Hok Hei 67'	Report	Kedwards 10'; Johns 20'	Attendance: 645; Referee: Poon Chun Kit
	Penalties
	Scott (penalty scored); Wong Chi Chuen (penalty scored); Lam Hok Hei (penalty scored); Kametani (penalty scored); Takatori (penalty missed)		McGunnigle (penalty scored); Weston (penalty scored); Kedwards (penalty scored); Yiu Ho Ming (penalty scored); Bleda (penalty scored)

4 October 2026	Kowloon City	1–2	Eastern District	Sham Shui Po Sports Ground
16:00	Riquelme 67'	Report	Li Ngai Hoi 3'; Hélio 75'	Attendance: 381; Referee: Tam Ping Wun

4 October 2026	Rangers	1–3	Tai Po	Hammer Hill Road Sports Ground
16:00	Flavio 45+1'	Report	Marquinhos 21'; Murilo 66'; Wallisson 83'	Attendance: 290; Referee: Wong Wai Lun

==== Second Round ====
14 November 2026	North District	4–3	HKFC	Tsing Yi Sports Ground
15:00	Vinicius 52', 82'; Lo Kong Wai 54'; Arboleda 90+4'	Report	Bloxham 64', 89'; Dujardin 71'	Attendance: 191; Referee: Liu Kwok Man

15 November 2026	Eastern District	1–0	Eastern	Aberdeen Sports Ground
15:00	Renner 23'	Report		Attendance: 322; Referee: Tam Ping Wun

15 November 2026	Lee Man	2–1	Tai Po	Mong Kok Stadium
18:00	Phelipe 72'; Martínez 90+1'		Wallisson 69'	Attendance: 929; Referee: Poon Chun Kit

==== Third Round ====
5 December 2026	Lee Man	Match A9	Eastern District	Tai Po Sports Ground
15:00

==== Fourth Round ====
January 2027	Winner A9	Match A10	North District

=== Redemption Group ===
==== First Round ====
14 November 2026	Kowloon City	1–5	Kitchee	Siu Sai Wan Sports Ground
15:00	Chen Ngo Hin 90+2' (pen.)	Report	Obieta 13', 46', 53'; Juninho 45+2'; Kendy 67'	Attendance: 588; Referee: Lau Fong Hei

14 November 2026	Southern	2–2 (2–4 p)	Sha Tin	Siu Sai Wan Sports Ground
18:00	Kawase 35'; Pereira 84'	Report	Kametani 40'; Scott 56'	Attendance: 588; Referee: Wong Po Sing
	Penalties
	Pereira (penalty missed); Wong Ho Chun (penalty missed); Erins (penalty scored); Poon Pui Hin (penalty scored)		Lam Hok Hei (penalty scored); Dantas (penalty scored); Kametani (penalty scored); Aldalur (penalty scored)

==== Second Round ====
6 December 2026	HKFC	Match R4	Rangers	Hammer Hill Road Sports Ground
15:00

6 December 2026	Eastern	Match R5	Sha Tin	Tsing Yi Sports Ground
18:00

7 December 2026	Tai Po	Match R3	Kitchee	Mong Kok Stadium
20:00

==== Third Round ====
January 2027	Loser A9	Match R6	Winner R3

January 2027	Winner R4	Match R7	Winner R5

==== Fourth Round ====
28 March 2027	Loser A10	Match R8	Winner R6	Sham Shui Po Sports Ground
15:00

==== Fifth Round ====
21 April 2027	Winner R8	Match R9	Winner A7	Mong Kok Stadium
20:00

=== Final ===
1 May 2027	Winner A10	v	Winner R9	Kai Tak Youth Sports Ground
16:00

== Top scorers ==
Rank	Player	Club	Goals
1	(England) Hugo Kametani	Sha Tin	3
1	(Scotland) James Scott	Sha Tin	3
1	(Brazil) Vinicius Soares	North District	3
1	(Spain) Koldo Obieta	Kitchee	3
5	(Brazil) Wallisson Bahia	Tai Po	2
5	(Hong Kong) Calum Bloxham	HKFC	2
5	(Japan) Yu Okubo	Eastern	2
8	21 players		1
