= Marcus McMillan =

Scottish-born Hong Kong footballer

Marcus McMillan 麥美倫
Personal information
- Date of birth: 5 May 1995 (age 31)
- Place of birth: Cumbernauld, Scotland
- Height: 1.76 m (5 ft 9 in)
- Position: Midfielder

Team information
- Current team: Eastern District
- Number: 20

Youth career
- Hearts
- Aberdeen
- 2005: Celtic
- 2011–2013: Hearts

Senior career*
Years	Team	Apps	(Gls)
2013–2015	Airdrieonians	0	(0)
2018–2022	HKFC	42	(27)
2022	Cumbernauld United		
2022–2025	HKFC	29	(2)
2025–	Eastern District	4	(0)
- * Club domestic league appearances and goals as of 16 May 2026

Marcus McMillan (born 5 May 1995) is a professional footballer who currently plays as a midfielder for Hong Kong Premier League club Eastern District. Born in Scotland, he acquired his HKSAR passport in August 2026.

== Club career ==
Having started his career with Hearts and Aberdeen, McMillan was signed by Celtic in June 2005. However, he was released only months later for sporting a Liverpool-inspired haircut.

Following his release from Celtic, McMillan found himself back at Hearts, but was released in the summer of 2013. He then joined Airdrieonians on an amateur contract, playing with their under-20 side. He made one appearance for The Diamonds, coming on as a substitute for Kyle Richford in a 2–0 cup defeat to Queen of the South.

In January 2018, McMillan joined Hong Kong First Division club HKFC.

On 20 August 2025, McMillan joined Hong Kong Premier League club Eastern District.

== International career ==
On 28 August 2026, McMillan officially announced that he had received a HKSAR passport, making him eligible to represent Hong Kong internationally.

== 2021 Hong Kong match fixing scandal ==
In October 2021, Brian Fok offered bribe to fellow HKFC players McMillan and Jean Maciel to play an unfair match against Rangers. However, McMillan and Maciel both rejected the offer and reported the matter to the club. In May 2023, the ICAC arrested 11 football players, including Brian Fok.

== Career statistics ==
=== Club ===
updated as at 7 May 2023

Appearances and goals by club, season and competition
Club	Season	League			Cup		League Cup		Total	
Club	Season	Division	Apps	Goals	Apps	Goals	Apps	Goals	Apps	Goals
Airdrieonians	2013–14	Scottish League One	0	0	0	0	1 (Note: Appearances in the Scottish Challenge Cup)	0	1	0
Airdrieonians	2014–15	Scottish League One	0	0	0	0	0	0	0	0
Airdrieonians	Total		0	0	0	0	1	0	1	0
HKFC	2017–18	First Division	8	9	0	0	0	0	8	9
HKFC	2018–19	First Division	15	10	0	0	0	0	15	10
HKFC	2019–20	First Division	8	3	0	0	0	0	8	3
HKFC	2020–21	First Division	7	5	0	0	0	0	7	5
HKFC	2021–22	Premier League	4	0	1	0	4 (Note: Appearances in the Sapling Cup)	0	9	0
HKFC	2022–23	Premier League	6	0	1	1	3	1	10	2
HKFC	Total		48	27	2	1	7	1	57	29
Career total			63	48	2	1	9	1	74	50
