= Freddie Toomer =

English footballer

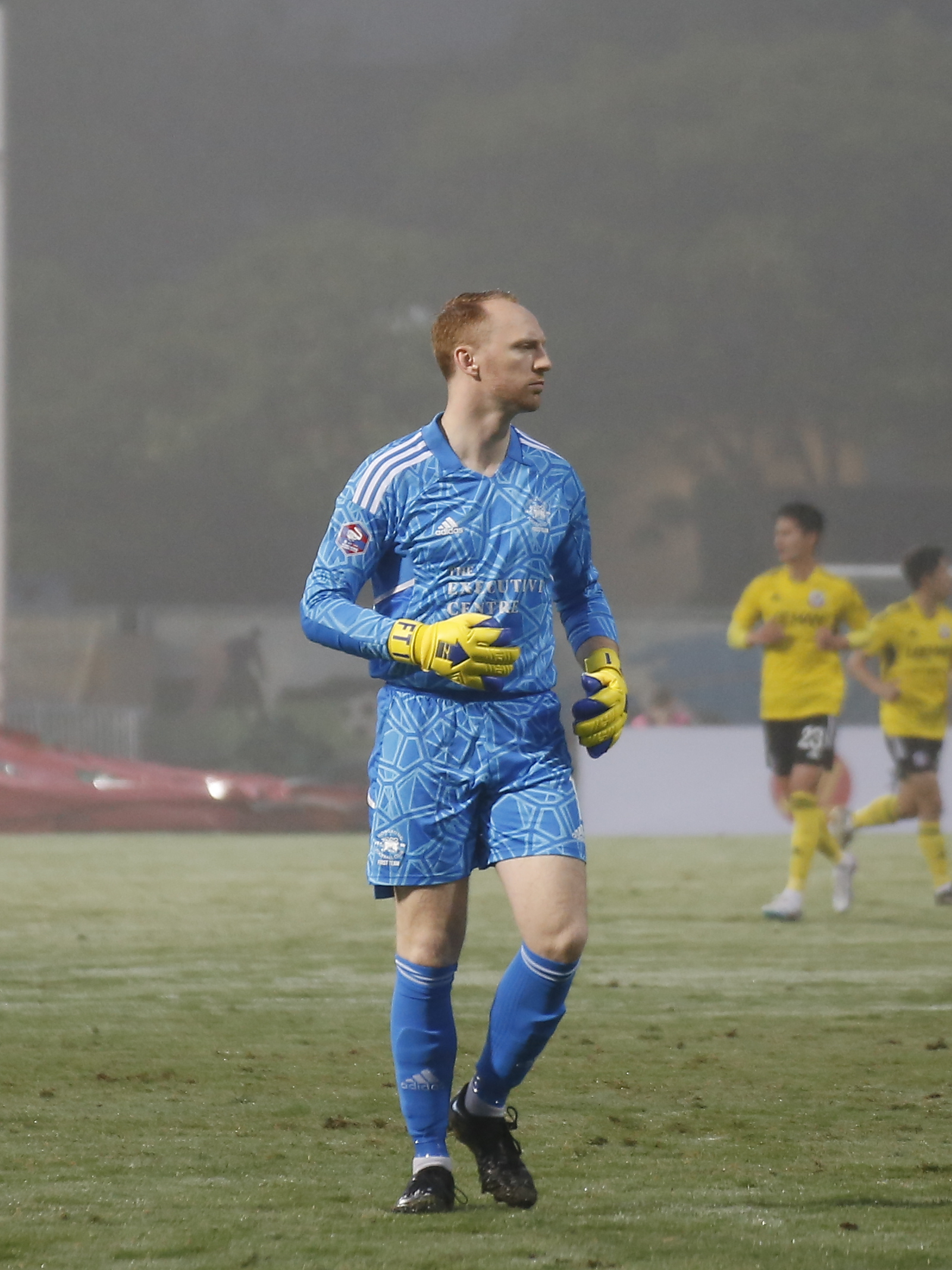

Personal information
- Full name: Frederick Charles Toomer
- Date of birth: 19 February 1992 (age 34)
- Place of birth: Southampton, England
- Height: 1.80 m (5 ft 11 in)
- Position: Goalkeeper

Senior career*
| Years | Team | Apps | (Gls) |
| 2008–2009 | Alresford Town | 4 | (0) |
| 2009 | Laverstock & Ford | 17 | (0) |
| 2010–2011 | Eastleigh | 3 | (0) |
| 2010–2011 | → Romsey Town (loan) | 28 | (0) |
| 2011–2012 | Bemerton Heath Harlequins | 35 | (0) |
| 2012 | Verwood Town | 5 | (0) |
| 2015 | Hythe & Dibden | 2 | (0) |
| 2017–2025 | HKFC | 113 | (1) |
- * Club domestic league appearances and goals as of 25 May 2025

Frederick Charles Toomer (born 19 February 1992) is a former English professional footballer who played as a goalkeeper.

== Club career ==
=== HKFC ===
On 5 February 2023, in a rather unorthodox fashion, Toomer managed to score his first-ever goal against Resources Capital with an impressive bicycle kick in the 6th minute of second-half stoppage time to level the score at 1–1 and give his side HKFC a hard earned point.

On 2 May 2025, Toomer announced his retirement from professional football. On 25 May 2025, he made his final appearance for HKFC in the match against Kowloon City.

== Career statistics ==
=== Club ===
As of 7 May 2023

Appearances and goals by club, season and competition
| Club | Season | League | | | Cup | | League Cup | | Total | |
| Club | Season | Division | Apps | Goals | Apps | Goals | Apps | Goals | Apps | Goals |
|---|---|---|---|---|---|---|---|---|---|---|
| Eastleigh | 2009–10 | Conference South | 2 | 0 | 0 | 0 | 0 | 0 | 2 | 0 |
| Eastleigh | 2010–11 | Conference South | 1 | 0 | 0 | 0 | 0 | 0 | 1 | 0 |
| Eastleigh | Total | | 3 | 0 | 0 | 0 | 0 | 0 | 3 | 0 |
| HKFC | 2017–18 | First Division | 25 | 0 | 0 | 0 | 0 | 0 | 25 | 0 |
| HKFC | 2018–19 | First Division | 24 | 0 | 0 | 0 | 0 | 0 | 24 | 0 |
| HKFC | 2019–20 | First Division | 12 | 0 | 0 | 0 | 0 | 0 | 12 | 0 |
| HKFC | 2020–21 | First Division | 5 | 0 | 0 | 0 | 0 | 0 | 5 | 0 |
| HKFC | 2021–22 | Premier League | 2 | 0 | 1 (Note: Appearances in the Hong Kong FA Cup) | 0 | 0 | 0 | 3 | 0 |
| HKFC | 2022–23 | Premier League | 18 | 1 | 2 | 0 | 2 | 0 | 22 | 1 |
| HKFC | Total | | 86 | 1 | 3 | 0 | 2 | 0 | 91 | 1 |
| Career total | | | 173 | 1 | 3 | 0 | 17 | 0 | 192 | 1 |
