= 2026–27 Hong Kong Premier League =

13th season of the Hong Kong Premier League

Hong Kong Premier League
- Season: 2026–27
- Dates: 21 August 2026 – 23 May 2027
- Matches: 42
- Goals: 145 (3.45 per match)
- Top goalscorer: Yu Okubo (7 goals)
- Biggest home win: North District 5–0 Rangers (13 September 2026)
- Biggest away win: Sha Tin 0–5 North District (6 September 2026)
- Highest scoring: Tai Po 4–2 Southern (19 October 2026); Lee Man 1–5 Kitchee (19 October 2026)
- Longest winning run: 5 matches 3 teams
- Longest unbeaten run: 7 matches Kitchee; North District
- Longest winless run: 7 matches Sha Tin
- Longest losing run: 4 matches Rangers
- Highest attendance: 4,593; Sha Tin 1–1 Rangers (7 November 2026)
- Lowest attendance: 386; Southern 1–1 Rangers (21 November 2026)
- Total attendance: 48,152
- Average attendance: 1,146
- All statistics correct as of 22 November 2026.

The 2026–27 Hong Kong Premier League (also known as the BOC Life Hong Kong Premier League for sponsorship reasons) is the 13th season of the Hong Kong Premier League, the top division of Hong Kong football.

== Teams ==
A total of 11 teams compete in the league, including the top 10 teams from the previous season and 1 team promoted from the First Division League.

Sha Tin will play in the Premier League for the first time in their history this season.

Club	Founded	Position 2025–26
Kitchee	1931	1st
Tai Po	2002	2nd
Lee Man	2017	3rd
Eastern	1932	4th
North District	2002	5th
Kowloon City	2002	6th
Southern	2002	7th
Eastern District	2002	8th
Rangers	1958	9th
HKFC	1886	10th
Sha Tin	1982	9th in First Division

=== Stadia and locations ===
Locations of the 2026–27 Hong Kong Premier League clubs

Eastern Lee Man	Eastern District	HKFC	Kitchee	Kowloon City	North District
Mong Kok Stadium	Siu Sai Wan Sports Ground	HKFC Stadium	Tseung Kwan O Sports Ground	Kai Tak Youth Sports Ground	North District Sports Ground
Capacity: 6,664	Capacity: 11,981	Capacity: 2,750	Capacity: 3,500	Capacity: 5,000	Capacity: 2,500
Rangers	Sha Tin			Southern	Tai Po
Tsing Yi Sports Ground	Hammer Hill Road Sports Ground	Sha Tin Sports Ground	Kai Tak Youth Sports Ground	Aberdeen Sports Ground	Tai Po Sports Ground
Capacity: 1,500	Capacity: 2,200	Capacity: 2,540	Capacity: 5,000	Capacity: 9,000	Capacity: 3,200

=== Personnel and kits ===
Team	Chairman	Head Coach	Captain	Kit Manufacturer	Chest Sponsor					
Team	Chairman	Head Coach	Captain	Kit Manufacturer	Eastern	(Hong Kong) Cheng Kai Ming	(Portugal) André Jasmins	(Hong Kong) Leung Chun Pong	Adidas	Crocodile
Eastern District	(Hong Kong) Goldbert Chi Chiu	(Hong Kong) Ng Wai Chiu	(Hong Kong) Hélio	NUR						
HKFC	(Hong Kong) Mark Grainger	(England) Darren Arnott	(England) Charlie Weston	Puma	The Executive Centre					
Kitchee	(Hong Kong) Ken Ng	(Spain) Iñigo Calderón	(Hong Kong) Tan Chun Lok	Nike	EDPS					
Kowloon City	(Hong Kong) Wong Siu Kei	(Hong Kong) Fung Hoi Man	(Hong Kong) Tsang Kam To	Umbro	Resources Capital					
Lee Man	(Hong Kong) Norman Lee	(Australia) Giancarlo Italiano	(Hong Kong) Ngan Lok Fung	Adidas	Lee & Man Chemical					
North District	(Hong Kong) Chu Ho Yin	(Hong Kong) Sin Ka Yu	(Hong Kong) Lo Kong Wai	Kelme	Golik					
Rangers	(Hong Kong) Mok Man Too	(Hong Kong) Szeto Man Chun	(Hong Kong) Lau Chi Lok	Kelme	EGL Tours					
Sha Tin	(Hong Kong) Wong Chi Chuen	(England) Tom Ballantyne	(Hong Kong) Law Tsz Chun	Kelme	LiveNation					
Southern	(Hong Kong) Matthew Wong	(Hong Kong) Chan Chi Hong	(Japan) Shu Sasaki	Kelme	CRRC					
Tai Po	(Hong Kong) Lam Yick Kuen	(Hong Kong) Lee Chi Kin	(Brazil) Gabriel Cividini	Kelme	X Wallet					

Notes

- Kelme continues to provide the venue uniforms and official match footballs for Hong Kong Premier League.
- Adidas provides professional uniform for the referee.

=== Managerial changes ===
Team	Outgoing manager	Manner of departure	Date of vacancy	Position in table	Incoming manager	Date of appointment
HKFC	(South Africa) Chancy Cooke	Change of role	19 May 2026	Pre-season	(England) Darren Arnott	21 August 2026
Lee Man	(England) Darren Read	End of interim role	31 May 2026	Pre-season	(Australia) Giancarlo Italiano	17 June 2026
Southern	(Hong Kong) Pui Ho Wang	Change of role	31 May 2026	Pre-season	(Hong Kong) Chan Chi Hong	4 July 2026
North District	(Hong Kong) Chan Chi Hong	Mutual consent	1 July 2026	Pre-season	(Hong Kong) Sin Ka Yu	9 July 2026
Rangers	(Hong Kong) Poon Man Tik	Change of role	4 July 2026	Pre-season	(Hong Kong) Szeto Man Chun	4 July 2026
Sha Tin	(Hong Kong) Lee Wai Man	Change of role	16 July 2026	Pre-season	(Hong Kong) Kwok Kar Lok	16 July 2026
Eastern	(Spain) Manuel Torres	Mutual consent	8 September 2026	8th	(Hong Kong) Cristiano Cordeiro	8 September 2026
Sha Tin	(Hong Kong) Kwok Kar Lok	Mutual consent	16 September 2026	7th	(Hong Kong) Lee Wai Man	16 September 2026
Sha Tin	(Hong Kong) Lee Wai Man	Change of role	6 October 2026	8th	(England) Tom Ballantyne	6 October 2026
Eastern	(Hong Kong) Cristiano Cordeiro	Change of role	4 November 2026	11th	(Portugal) André Jasmins	8 September 2026

== League table ==
Pos	Team	Pld	W	D	L	GF	GA	GD	Pts	Qualification or relegation
1	Lee Man	8	7	0	1	18	7	+11	21	Qualification for AFC Champions League Two preliminary stage
2	Kitchee	7	6	1	0	21	6	+15	19	
3	North District	8	6	1	1	19	5	+14	19	
4	Tai Po	8	4	1	3	17	13	+4	13	
5	Southern	7	3	1	3	12	12	0	10	
6	HKFC	6	2	1	3	8	14	−6	7	
7	Eastern District	7	2	1	4	10	16	−6	7	
8	Eastern	8	2	1	5	13	15	−2	7	
9	Rangers	10	1	3	6	10	21	−11	6	
10	Kowloon City	7	1	2	4	8	16	−8	5	
11	Sha Tin	8	1	2	5	9	20	−11	5	Relegation to First Division League

Updated to match(es) played on 22 November 2026. Source: Hong Kong Football Association
Rules for classification: 1) Points; 2) Head-to-head points; 3) Head-to-head goal difference; 4) Head-to-head goals scored; 5) Goal difference; 6) Goals scored; 7) Fair-play points; 8) Drawing lots (Play-off if the winner has to be decided).

== Results ==
=== Home and away ===
Home \ Away	EAS	EDS	HKF	KIT	KLC	LEE	NOR	RAN	SHA	SOU	TPF
Eastern	—				4–0		1–3		1–3		
Eastern District	2–2	—							2–1		1–3
HKFC	2–1		—			0–3					
Kitchee		4–1	4–0	—							
Kowloon City					—			2–2			
Lee Man		2–1		1–5	3–0	—	3–1		3–0	1–0	
North District				0–0	2–1		—	5–0			2–0
Rangers	1–0	1–3		2–3		0–2	0–1	—			
Sha Tin	0–3		2–2		2–3		0–5	1–1	—		
Southern		3–0	3–2	1–3	2–1			1–1		—	
Tai Po	4–1		1–2	1–2	1–1			3–2		4–2	—

Updated to match(es) played on 22 November 2026. Source: HKFA
Legend: Blue = home team win; Yellow = draw; Red = away team win.

== Results by match played ==
Win
Draw
Lose

Team ╲ Match	1	2	3	4	5	6	7	8	9	10	11	12	13	14	15	16	17	18	19	20
Eastern	L	L	W	L	L	D	L	W												
Eastern District	W	L	L	L	D	W	L													
HKFC	L	L	W	L	D	W														
Kitchee	W	D	W	W	W	W	W													
Kowloon City	L	L	L	W	D	D	L													
Lee Man	W	W	W	W	W	L	W	W												
North District	W	D	W	W	W	W	W	L												
Rangers	L	L	L	L	W	L	L	D	D	D										
Sha Tin	W	L	L	L	D	L	D	L												
Southern	W	W	L	W	L	L	D													
Tai Po	L	W	W	L	D	W	W	L												

Updated to match(es) played on 22 November 2026. Source: Hong Kong Football Association website

== Season statistics ==
=== Top scorers ===
As of 21 November 2026

Rank	Player	Club	Goals
1	(Japan) Yu Okubo	Eastern	7
2	(Spain) Noah Baffoe	Lee Man	5
2	(Hong Kong) Everton Camargo	Kitchee	5
2	(Brazil) Samuel Granada	North District	5
2	(Brazil) Paulinho Simionato	Tai Po	5
6	(Brazil) Wallisson Bahia	Tai Po	4
6	(Serbia) Stefan Golubović	Southern	4
6	(Hong Kong) Juninho	Kitchee	4
6	(Spain) Adrián Revilla	Kitchee	4
10	11 players		3

=== Hat-tricks ===
Note: The results column shows the scorer's team score first. Teams in bold are home teams.

#	Player	For	Against	Result	Date	Ref
1	(Brazil) Samuel Granada	**North District**	Rangers	5–0	13 September 2026	

=== Clean sheets ===
As of 22 November 2026

Rank	Player	Club	Matches
1	(Hong Kong) Chan Ka Ho	Lee Man	5
2	(Hong Kong) Chan Kun Sun	North District	4
3	(Hong Kong) Pong Cheuk Hei	Kitchee	2
4	(Hong Kong) Li Hon Ho	North District	1
4	(Hong Kong) Ng Wai Him	Southern	1
4	(Hong Kong) Yapp Hung Fai	Eastern	1
4	(Hong Kong) Yip Ka Yu	Rangers	1
4	(Hong Kong) Yuen Ho Chun	Eastern	1

== Attendances ==
As of 22 November 2026

Pos	Team	Total	High	Low	Average	Change
1	Lee Man	13,235	4,592	1,049	2,206	+90.7%
2	Sha Tin	9,312	4,593	894	1,826	n/a^{1}
3	Kowloon City	1,768	1,768	1,768	1,768	+240.7%
4	Eastern	5,278	3,329	828	1,759	+81.0%
5	Kitchee	1,637	991	646	819	−28.6%
6	North District	3,241	1,001	552	811	+56.9%
7	HKFC	1,534	805	729	767	+14.1%
8	Tai Po	4,038	985	436	673	+65.0%
9	Eastern District	2,002	928	411	667	−35.9%
10	Southern	3,135	1,065	386	627	+57.5%
11	Rangers	2,972	906	423	594	−29.1%
	**League total**	**48,152**	**4,593**	**386**	1,146	**+54.2%**

Source: HKFA
Notes:
1: Team did not play in the Premier League last season
