= Issey Maholo =

Japanese footballer

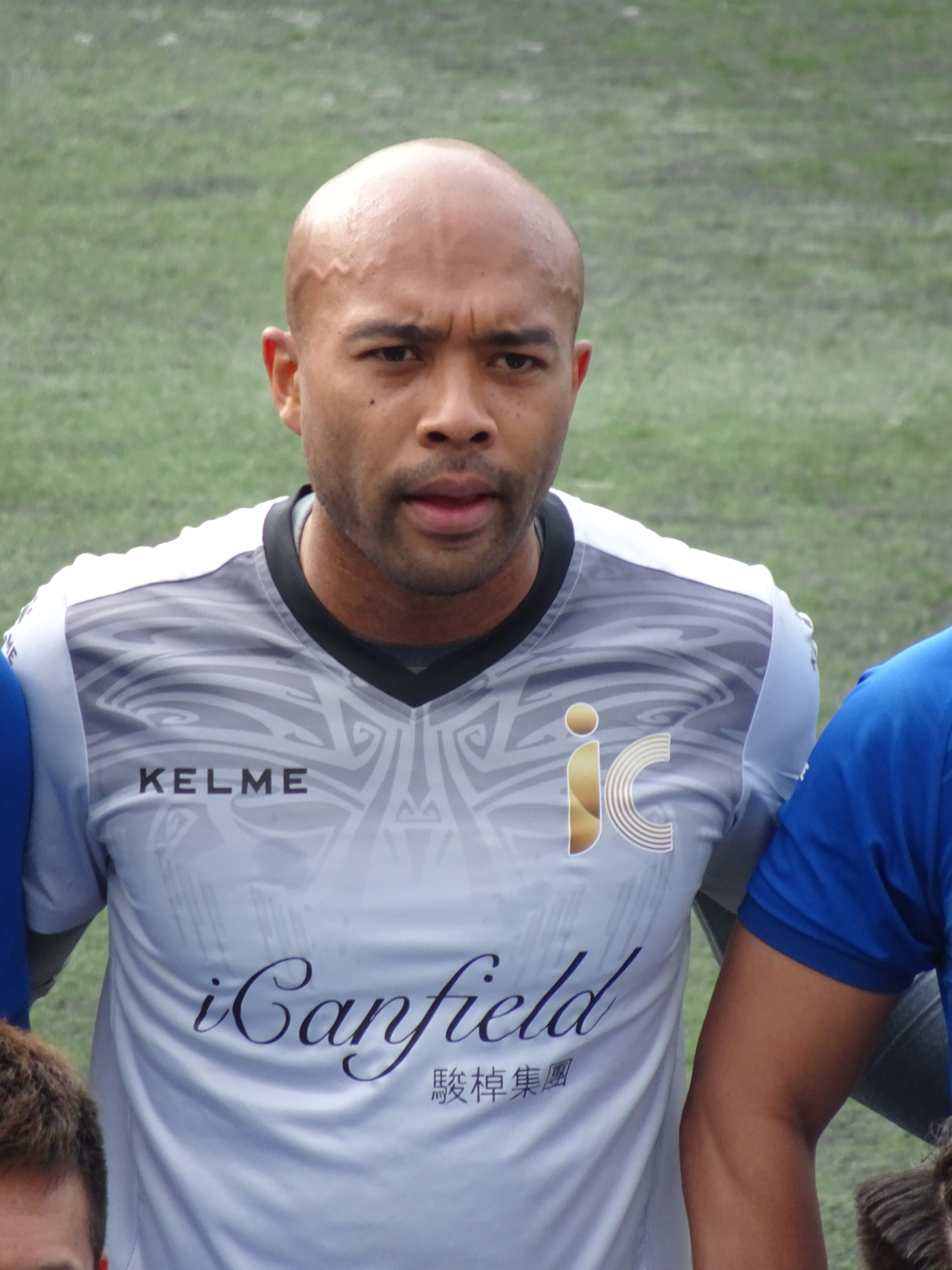

Personal information
- Full name: Issey Jose Maholo
- Date of birth: 24 March 1985 (age 41)
- Place of birth: Tokyo, Japan
- Height: 1.77 m (5 ft 10 in)
- Position: Goalkeeper

Youth career
- 1998–2003: Kawasaki Frontale

College career
Years	Team	Apps	(Gls)
2003–2007	Boston College Eagles	40	(0)

Senior career*
Years	Team	Apps	(Gls)
2006	Ocean City Barons	8	(0)
2011–2017	HKFC	61	(0)
2017–2018	Kwun Tong	7	(0)
2018–2019	HKFC	2	(0)
2019–2021	Metro Gallery	14	(0)
2021–2022	Club Colts		
2022–2024	HKFC	4	(0)
- * Club domestic league appearances and goals as of 26 May 2024

Issey Jose Maholo (マホロ一生, Maholo Issey; born 24 March 1985) is a former Japanese professional footballer who played as a goalkeeper.

== Career ==
Born in Tokyo, Japan, to a Japanese mother and Congolese father, Maholo played youth soccer for Kawasaki Frontale.

In 2003, Maholo enrolled at Boston College, where he joined the soccer team as a freshman. In 2006, he joined Premier Development League side Ocean City Nor'easters (then known as the Ocean City Barons), where he made 8 appearances.

Maholo was relocated to Hong Kong in 2011 to work in the banking industry. After that, he joined HKFC and helped them win promotion to the top-tier Hong Kong Premier League in 2016.

== Career statistics ==
=== Club ===
As of 21 May 2021.

Appearances and goals by club, season and competition
Club	Season	League			Cup		Other		Total	
Club	Season	Division	Apps	Goals	Apps	Goals	Apps	Goals	Apps	Goals
Ocean City Barons	2006	PDL	8	0	0	0	0	0	8	0
HKFC	2014–15	First Division	6	0	1 (Note: Appearances in the Hong Kong FA Cup)	0	0	0	7	0
HKFC	2015–16	First Division	25	0	1	0	0	0	26	0
HKFC	2016–17	Premier League	19	0	1	0	1 (Note: Appearances in the Senior Shield)	0	21	0
HKFC	2018–19	First Division	2	0	2	0	0	0	4	0
HKFC	Total		52	0	6	0	1	0	58	0
Metro Gallery	2019–20	First Division	10	0	0	0	0	0	10	0
Metro Gallery	2020–21	First Division	5	0	0	0	0	0	5	0
Metro Gallery	Total		15	0	0	0	0	0	15	0
Career total			75	0	5	0	1	0	81	0
