= Goldbert =

Goldbert is both a given name and surname. Notable people with the name include:

- Goldbert Chi Chiu (born 1981), Hong Kong boxer
- Cyril Goldbert (died 2018), birth name of Peter Wyngarde, British actor
