= Lam Chi Fung =

Hong Kong footballer

Personal information
- Full name: Lam Chi Fung
- Date of birth: 30 December 2001 (age 24)
- Place of birth: Hong Kong
- Height: 1.74 m (5 ft 9 in)
- Position: Forward

Youth career
- –2017: Wanchai
- 2018–2020: Southern

Senior career*
| Years | Team | Apps | (Gls) |
| 2017–2018 | Wanchai | 12 | (0) |
| 2020–2021 | Southern | 0 | (0) |
| 2021 | Citizen | 5 | (0) |
| 2021 | Eastern District | 4 | (3) |
| 2021–2024 | HK U23 | 29 | (1) |
| 2024 | HKFC | 3 | (0) |
| 2025–2026 | Eastern District | 2 | (0) |
- * Club domestic league appearances and goals as of 16 May 2026

Lam Chi Fung (Chinese: 林智豐; born 30 December 2001) is a former Hong Kong professional footballer who played as a forward.

== Club career ==
In October 2020, Lam was promoted to the first team of Southern.

On 12 October 2021, Lam joined HK U23.

On 31 July 2024, Lam joined HKFC.

In January 2025, Lam rejoined Eastern District.

== Career statistics ==
=== Club ===
As of 22 December 2024

| Club | Season | League | | | National Cup | | League Cup | | Other | | Total | |
| Club | Season | Division | Apps | Goals | Apps | Goals | Apps | Goals | Apps | Goals | Apps | Goals |
|---|---|---|---|---|---|---|---|---|---|---|---|---|
| Wanchai | 2017–18 | Hong Kong First Division | 12 | 0 | 0 | 0 | 0 | 0 | 0 | 0 | 12 | 0 |
| Southern District | 2020–21 | Hong Kong Premier League | 0 | 0 | 0 | 0 | 3 (Note: Appearances in the Hong Kong Sapling Cup) | 0 | 0 | 0 | 3 | 0 |
| Citizen | 2020–21 | Hong Kong First Division | 5 | 0 | 0 | 0 | 0 | 0 | 0 | 0 | 5 | 0 |
| Eastern District | 2021–22 | Hong Kong First Division | 4 | 3 | 0 | 0 | 0 | 0 | 0 | 0 | 4 | 3 |
| HK U23 | 2021–22 | Hong Kong Premier League | 2 | 0 | 1 | 0 | 1 | 0 | 0 | 0 | 4 | 0 |
| HK U23 | 2022–23 | Hong Kong Premier League | 15 | 1 | 1 | 0 | 6 | 0 | 1 | 0 | 23 | 1 |
| HK U23 | 2023–24 | Hong Kong Premier League | 12 | 0 | 1 | 0 | 7 | 2 | 1 | 0 | 21 | 2 |
| HKFC | 2024–25 | Hong Kong Premier League | 3 | 0 | 0 | 0 | 1 | 1 | 1 | 0 | 5 | 1 |
| Career total | | | 53 | 4 | 3 | 0 | 18 | 3 | 3 | 0 | 77 | 7 |
