= Cian Coleman (footballer, born 2004) =

English footballer

Personal information
- Full name: Cian Eric Coleman
- Date of birth: 23 September 2004 (age 22)
- Place of birth: Pudsey, England
- Position: Midfielder

Team information
- Current team: HKFC
- Number: 10

Youth career
- 2013–2025: Leeds United

Senior career*
Years	Team	Apps	(Gls)
2023–2025	Leeds United	0	(0)
2024–2025	→ Buxton (loan)	28	(9)
2025–2026	Buxton	39	(8)
2026–	HKFC	6	(1)

International career
2021	Republic of Ireland U18	3	(0)
2022	Republic of Ireland U19	2	(0)
- * Club domestic league appearances and goals as of 18:00, 8 November 2026 (UTC)

Cian Eric Coleman (born 23 September 2004) is a professional footballer who currently plays as a midfielder for Hong Kong Premier League club HKFC. Born in England, he was a youth international for Republic of Ireland.

== Club career ==
=== Early career ===
Coleman began his career with Leeds United aged 9. On 17 February 2023, Coleman signed his first professional contract with the club until 2025. On 18 October 2024, he joined National League North club Buxton on a one-month loan. After impressing, his loan was extended until January in November 2024, before returning to Leeds at the end of his deal. On 10 February 2025, he returned to Buxton on loan until the end of the season. He was released by Leeds at the end of the 2024–25 season.

=== Buxton ===
After his departure from Leeds, Coleman rejoined Buxton permanently in June 2025.

=== HKFC ===
On 21 August 2026, Coleman left Buxton to join Hong Kong Premier League club HKFC.

== Career statistics ==
As of 12 September 2026

Appearances and goals by club, season and competition
Club	Season	League			National cup (Note: Includes FA Cup, Hong Kong FA Cup)		League cup (Note: Includes Hong Kong League Cup)		Other		Total	
Club	Season	Division	Apps	Goals	Apps	Goals	Apps	Goals	Apps	Goals	Apps	Goals
Leeds United U21	2022–23	—			—		—		1 (Note: Appearance in EFL Trophy)	0	1	0
Leeds United U21	2024–25	—			—		—		2 (Note: Appearances in National League Cup)	1	2	1
Leeds United U21	Total		—		—		—		3	1	3	1
Buxton (loan)	2024–25	National League North	28	9	—		—		2 (Note: One appearance in FA Trophy; one appearance in National League North play-offs)	0	30	9
Buxton	2025–26	National League North	39	8	3	0	—		3 (Note: One appearance in FA Trophy; two appearances, two goals in National League North play-offs)	2	45	10
HKFC	2026–27	Hong Kong Premier League	3	1	0	0	0	0	0	0	3	1
Career total			70	18	3	0	0	0	8	3	81	21
