= Shunsuke Nakamura (disambiguation) =

Shunsuke Nakamura (born 1978) is a Japanese former professional footballer.

Shunsuke Nakamura may also refer to:

- Shunsuke Nakamura (footballer, born 1983), Japanese former footballer
- Shunsuke Nakamura (footballer, born 1994), Japanese footballer
- Shunsuke Nakamura (figure skater), Japanese figure skater

== See also ==
- Shinsuke Nakamura (born 1980), Japanese wrestler
