= Remi Dujardin =

Hong Kong footballer (born 1997)

Remi Dujardin 杜國榆
Personal information
- Full name: Remi Dujardin
- Date of birth: 23 June 1997 (age 29)
- Place of birth: North Point, Hong Kong
- Height: 1.88 m (6 ft 2 in)
- Positions: Defensive midfielder; centre back

Team information
- Current team: Nantong Zhiyun
- Number: 23

Youth career
- 2007–2012: Kitchee
- 2012–2015: Pegasus

College career
| Years | Team | Apps | (Gls) |
| 2015–2018 | St. Bonaventure Bonnies | 70 | (1) |

Senior career*
| Years | Team | Apps | (Gls) |
| 2016 | Rochester Lancers | | |
| 2019 | Jumilla | 0 | (0) |
| 2019 | Estudiantes de Murcia | 2 | (0) |
| 2020–2021 | Skënderbeu | 0 | (0) |
| 2021 | Egnatia | 0 | (0) |
| 2022–2023 | Sham Shui Po | 14 | (1) |
| 2023 | Dandong Tengyue | 10 | (0) |
| 2024 | Rangers (HKG) | 12 | (0) |
| 2024–2026 | Tai Po | 37 | (1) |
| 2026– | Nantong Zhiyun | 14 | (0) |

International career^{‡}
| 2017–2019 | Hong Kong U-23 | 6 | (0) |
| 2026– | Hong Kong | 1 | (0) |
- * Club domestic league appearances and goals as of 7 November 2026 ‡ National team caps and goals as of 9 June 2026

Remi Dujardin (Chinese: 杜國榆; born 23 June 1997) is a Hong Kong professional footballer who currently plays as a defensive midfielder or a centre back for China League One club Nantong Zhiyun and the Hong Kong national team.

== College career ==
In April 2016, Dujardin signed for National Premier Soccer League club Rochester River Dogz. Meanwhile, he also played college soccer for St. Bonaventure Bonnies in NCAA Division I.

== Club career ==
In January 2019, after graduating from college, Dujardin turned professional and signed for Segunda División B club Jumilla. He also played for Tercera División club Estudiantes de Murcia, the reserve team of Jumilla.

In September 2020, Dujardin signed for Kategoria Superiore club Skënderbeu after trialing for Veikkausliiga club HIFK few months ago.

In August 2021, Dujardin joined another Kategoria Superiore club Egnatia.

On 8 August 2022, Dujardin returned to Hong Kong and signed for Hong Kong Premier League club Sham Shui Po.

On 6 April 2023, Dujardin signed for China League One club Dandong Tengyue.

On 27 January 2024, Dujardin joined Rangers. He appeared in 14 matches in the 2023–24 season for the club including 12 league games and 2 cup games.

On 18 July 2024, Dujardin joined Tai Po.

On 5 March 2026, Dujardin joined China League One club Nantong Zhiyun.

== International career ==
Dujardin has represented Hong Kong internationally on the youth level, being a regular team member of Hong Kong U-23 from 2017 to 2019.

In May 2026, Dujardin was called up to the Hong Kong senior squad for the international friendly matches in June against Mongolia and Cambodia.

On 9 June 2026, Dujardin made his international debut for Hong Kong in a friendly match against Cambodia.

== Personal life ==
Dujardin's younger brother Alexandre is also a professional footballer. They are born to a French father and Taiwanese mother. During the 2022 season, the brothers played on opposing sides for the first time when Alexandre played for HKFC and Remi played for Sham Shui Po.

The brothers played together in the 25/26 season at Tai Po F.C.

== Career statistics ==
=== International ===
As of 9 June 2026

| National team | Year | Apps | Goals |
|---|---|---|---|
| Hong Kong | 2026 | 1 | 0 |
| Total | | 1 | 0 |

== Honours ==
Rangers

- Hong Kong Sapling Cup: 2023–24

Tai Po

- Hong Kong Premier League: 2024–25
- Hong Kong Senior Shield: 2025–26
