= Maddox Kong =

Hong Kong-Togolese footballer

Personal information
- Date of birth: 17 September 2002 (age 24)
- Place of birth: Lomé, Togo
- Height: 1.66 m (5 ft 5 in)
- Position: Winger

Youth career
- 2014–2017: Grêmio
- 2018: Manchester United Foundation

Senior career*
Years	Team	Apps	(Gls)
2021–2022	Southern	2	(0)
2022–2023	Kitchee	0	(0)
2023	HKFC	2	(0)
2024	Sun Hei	6	(0)

International career^{‡}
2023	Hong Kong U-22	2	(0)
- * Club domestic league appearances and goals as of 28 October 2024 ‡ National team caps and goals as of 26 March 2023

Maddox Kong (Chinese: 江展民; born 17 September 2002) is a former professional footballer who played as a winger. Born in Togo, he is a youth international for Hong Kong.

== Early life ==
Kong was born on 17 September 2002 in the Togolese capital of Lomé, to a Chinese father and a Togolese mother.

== Club career ==
Kong began his career with Brazilian side Grêmio, joining at under-13 level and spending five seasons with the club before a year with the Manchester United Foundation.

On 3 August 2021, Kong signed with Hong Kong Premier League club Southern, where he spent a year, accumulating eleven appearances in all competitions.

Kong spent the 2022–23 season with Kitchee, making three appearances in the Sapling Cup.

On 29 July 2023, Kong moved to HKFC.

== International career ==
Kong has represented Hong Kong at the under-22 level, featuring for the team at the 2023 Merlion Cup. He remains eligible to represent Togo.

== Career statistics ==
=== Club ===
As of 28 August 2023

Appearances and goals by club, season and competition
Club	Season	League			National cup		League Cup		Total	
Club	Season	Division	Apps	Goals	Apps	Goals	Apps	Goals	Apps	Goals
Southern	2021–22	Hong Kong Premier League	2	0	1 (Note: Appearances in the Hong Kong FA Cup)	0	8 (Note: Appearances in the Sapling Cup)	0	11	0
Kitchee	2022–23	Hong Kong Premier League	0	0	0	0	3	0	3	0
HKFC	2023–24	Hong Kong Premier League	1	0	0	0	0	0	1	0
Career total			3	0	1	0	11	0	15	0
