= Jean Maciel =

Brazilian-Portuguese footballer

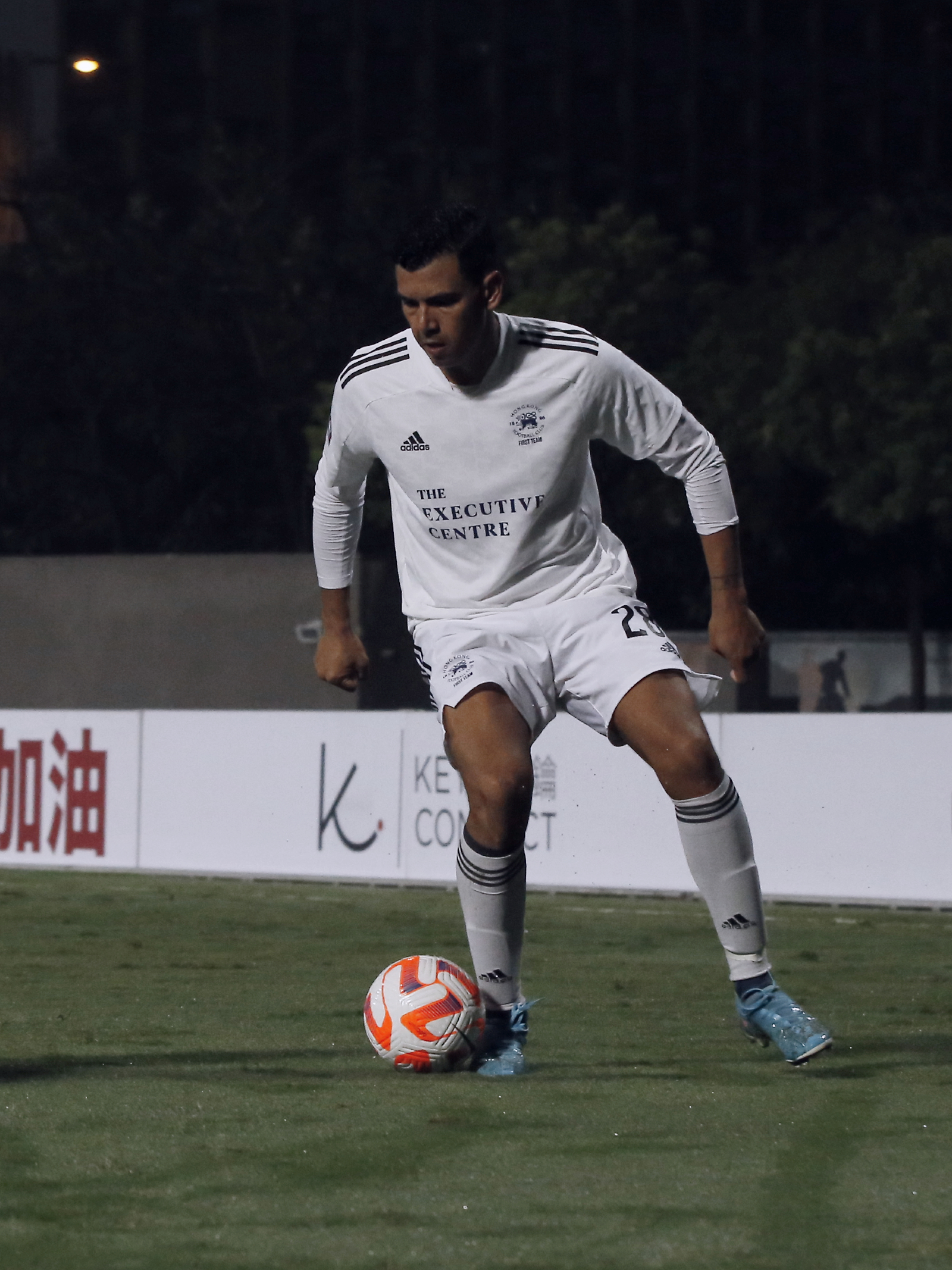

Personal information
- Full name: Jean Carllo Maciel
- Date of birth: 28 February 1989 (age 37)
- Place of birth: Anápolis, Goiás, Brazil
- Height: 1.90 m (6 ft 3 in)
- Position: Midfielder

Team information
- Current team: HKFC
- Number: 94

Youth career
- 1999–2003: Boavista
- 2003–2008: Salgueiros

Senior career*
Years	Team	Apps	(Gls)
2008	Salgueiros 08	8	(4)
2008	Pedras Rubras		
2009	Nelas	7	(0)
2010	Santa Maria	8	(0)
2011	Artsul		
2019–2024	HKFC	44	(13)
2026–	HKFC	0	(0)
- * Club domestic league appearances and goals as of 26 May 2024

Jean Carllo Maciel (born 28 February 1989) is a Brazilian-born Portuguese professional footballer who currently plays as a midfielder for Hong Kong Premier League club HKFC. He is also a former restaurant manager at Pirata Group and managed the Pici chain in Hong Kong.

== Senior career ==
=== HKFC ===
Maciel was promoted to the first team of the club ahead of the 2019–20 season and was with the club in the HKPL between 2021 and 2024. He retired from professional football at the age of 35 and transitioned into a coach for the club's youth sides.

In September 2026, Maciel rejoined the club after 2 years.

== Personal life ==
A former restaurant manager at the Pirata Group in Hong Kong, Maciel had youth stints in Boavista and Salgueiros youth when he moved to Portugal as a young child before coming to Hong Kong in 2018, enlisting himself for HKFC's amateur sides.

=== 2021 Hong Kong match fixing scandal ===
In October 2021, HKFC player Brian Fok offered a bribe to Maciel to play an unfair match against Hong Kong Rangers. However, Maciel rejected the offer and reported it to the club. In May 2023, the ICAC arrested 11 football players, including Brian Fok.

== Career statistics ==
=== Club ===
Updated as of 7 May 2023

Appearances and goals by club, season and competition
Club	Season	League			Cup		League Cup		Total	
Club	Season	Division	Apps	Goals	Apps	Goals	Apps	Goals	Apps	Goals
Salgueiros 08	2008–09	Porto FA Second Division	8	4	0	0	–		8	4
Nelas	2009–10	Terceira Divisão	7	0	0	0	–		7	0
Santa Maria	2009–10	Terceira Divisão	8	0	0	0	–		8	0
HKFC	2019–20	First Division	7	4	0	0	0	0	7	4
HKFC	2020–21	First Division	11	7	0	0	0	0	11	7
HKFC	2021–22	Premier League	3	0	1	0	3 (Note: Appearances in the Sapling Cup)	0	7	0
HKFC	2022–23	Premier League	11	1	1	0	7	2	19	3
HKFC	Total		32	12	2	0	10	2	44	14
Career total			55	16	2	0	10	2	67	18
