= Tony Hamilton-Bram =

English football manager (born 1966)

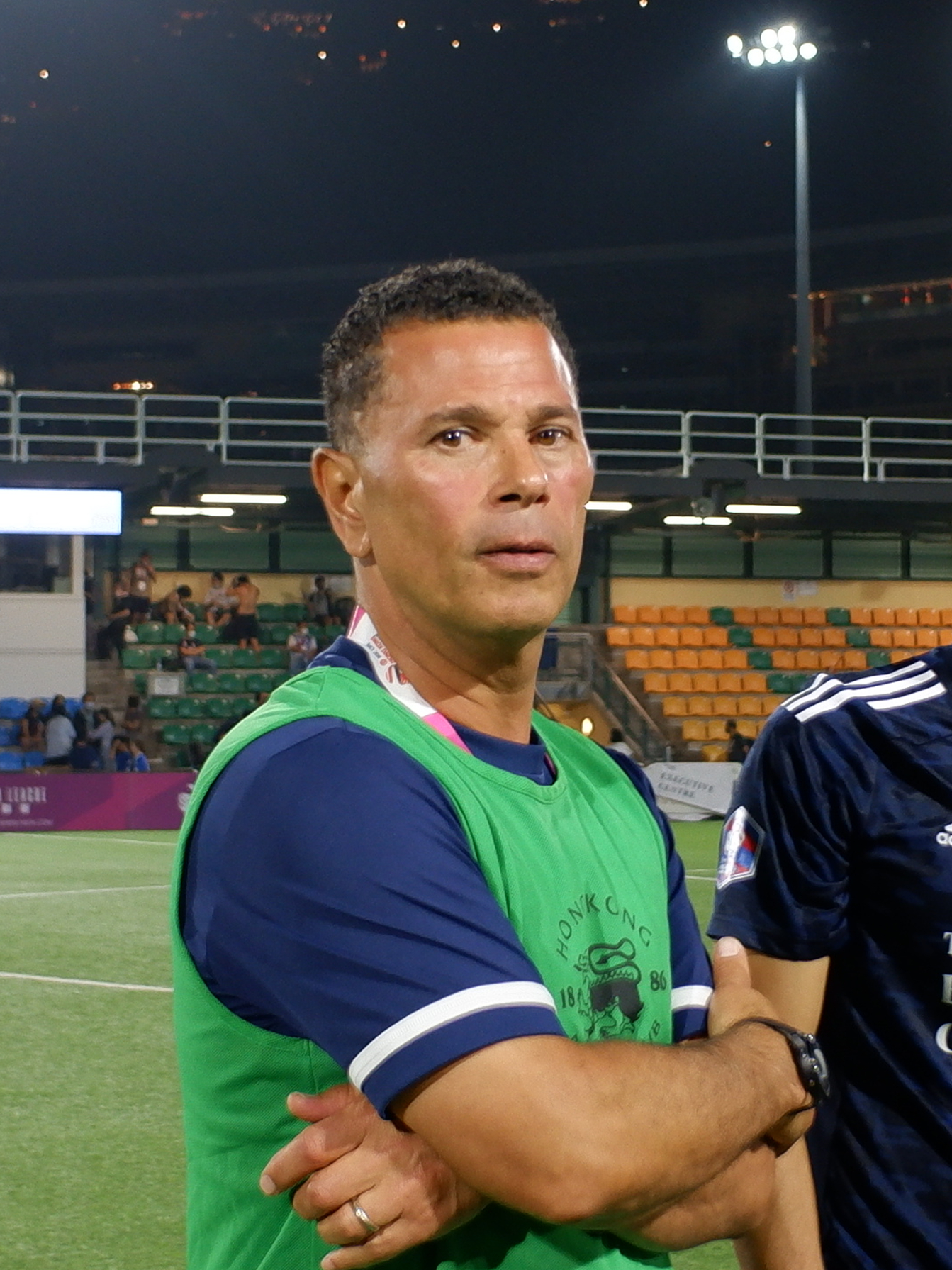

Personal information
- Full name: Antony Mark Hamilton-Bram
- Date of birth: 29 March 1966 (age 60)
- Place of birth: England

Managerial career
- Years: Team
- 2017-2024: HKFC

Antony Mark Hamilton-Bram (born 29 March 1966) is a former English football manager who last managed Hong Kong Premier League club HKFC.

== Career ==
Tony Hamilton-Bram played for both HKFC First Team and for Club Albion in the Yau Yee Football League between 2006 and 2017.

Hamilton-Bram was then appointed head coach of Hong Kong Football Club in the summer of 2017, Tony guided the team to significant success during his tenure. In the 2017–18 season, HKFC recorded a 42-match unbeaten run and won the Hong Kong Football Association First Division title after completing a 30-match unbeaten league campaign. The following season, 2018–19, the club finished as runners-up to Happy Valley. The 2019–20 season was later abandoned, but HKFC returned strongly in the COVID-affected 2020–21 season, winning the title once again while remaining unbeaten in a single-round format. A COVID affected 2021-22 season saw the season get cut short.

HKFC made their full return to the Hong Kong Premier League during the 2022–23 season, finishing sixth with 26 points and earning recognition as a potential top-half contender. In the subsequent 2023–24 season, the club maintained its competitive form, placing seventh out of eleven teams. Following a disappointing end to the 2023–24 season, Tony was relieved of his duties and succeeded by Chancy Cooke.
