= Timothy Chow =

Hong Kong footballer (born in 2006)

Timothy Chow 周子謙
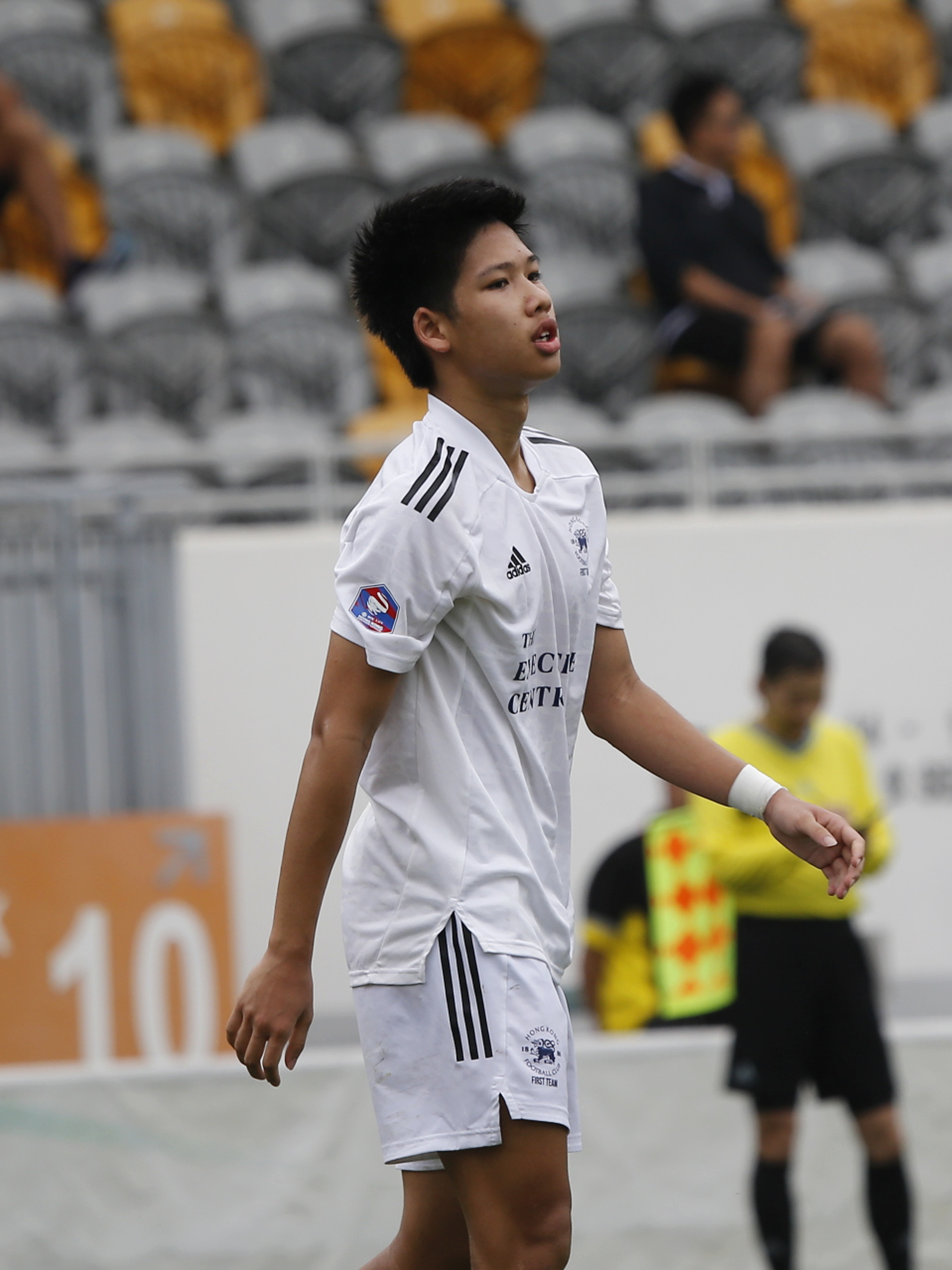

Personal information
- Full name: Timothy Stephen Chow
- Date of birth: 11 March 2006 (age 20)
- Place of birth: Hong Kong
- Height: 1.80 m (5 ft 11 in)
- Positions: Centre back; right back; defensive midfielder

Youth career
- 2018–2022: HKFC

Senior career*
Years	Team	Apps	(Gls)
2022–2024	HKFC	26	(1)
2024–2025	Lee Man	10	(0)

International career^{‡}
2022	Hong Kong U-16	3	(1)
2023–2025	Hong Kong U-23	6	(0)
2024	Hong Kong	1	(0)
- * Club domestic league appearances and goals as of 17 May 2025 ‡ National team caps and goals as of 5 September 2024

Timothy Stephen Chow (Chinese: 周子謙; born on 11 March 2006) is a Hong Kong former professional footballer who played as a defender.

== Early life ==
Chow joined HKFC at the age of 8, and from age 12, the club arranged for him to play against older opponents. As a primary schooler, Chow enrolled in the Diocesan Boys’ Primary Division, and played futsal at that age. After that, he played for Diocesan Boys' School.

== Club career ==
=== HKFC ===
In August 2022, Chow was promoted to the first team of HKFC. Timothy made his debut for the club on the 20th of November, coming on for Jack Sealy in the 2–1 victory over HK U23. Following his debut and at the age of 16, he made his first start for HKFC during a 2–1 win over Tai Po.

Chow's defensive performances led to him winning the HKPL Player of the Match on 19 March 2023 against HK U23 and on 7 May 2023 against Southern.

Chow scored his first HKPL goal on 7 May 2023 against Southern, making him the youngest goal scorer in HKPL history. He was voted Best U22 Player of the Team by Sapling Cup for the 2022–23 season.

=== Lee Man ===
On 4 July 2024, Chow joined Lee Man.

Following the conclusion of 2024–25 season, Chow stepped away from playing career to pursue studies at Amherst College.

== International career ==
In October 2022, Chow captained and scored a goal for the Hong Kong national under-17 football team.

Chow went on to represent the Hong Kong national under-23 football team during the 2023 Merlion Cup. Chow made a total of 2 appearances for the representative team in the Merlion Cup, returning with a 2nd place title.

Chow was a member of the final squad for the 2022 Asian Games that finished fourth in the competition, the best for Hong Kong since its first appearance in 1954. Chow was the youngest player in the team squads of the Football men's tournament at the 2022 Asian Games.

Chow was named in the 43-man preliminary squad in preparation for the 2026 World Cup qualifiers against Iran and Turkmenistan.

On 5 September 2024, Chow made his international debut for Hong Kong in a friendly match against Solomon Islands.

== Style of play ==
Chow models his playing style after Argentine defender Lisandro Martínez.

== Personal life ==
Timothy has an older brother, Christopher Chow, who currently plays for Pomona.
