= Yip Ka Yu =

Hong Kong footballer (born 1999)

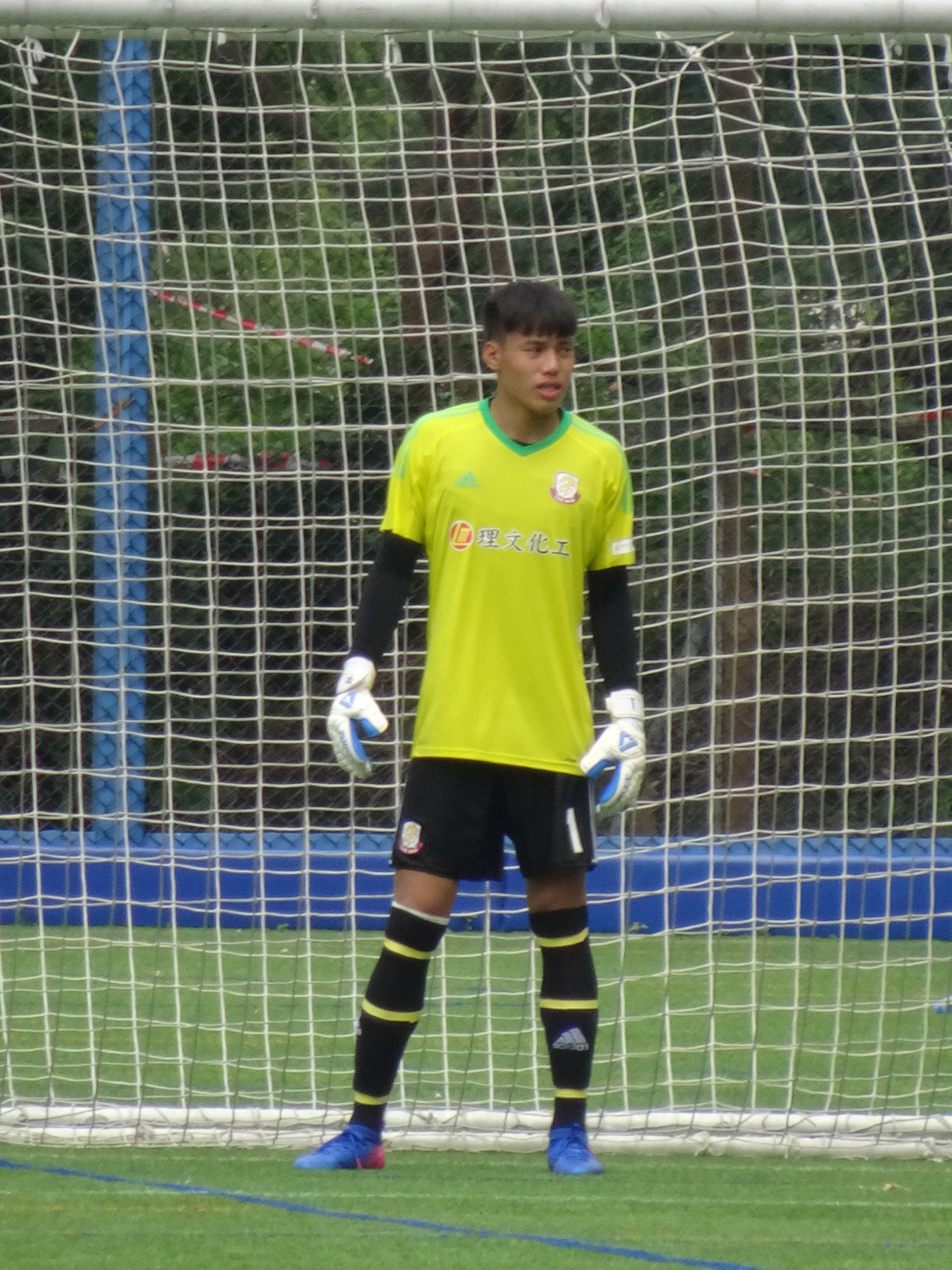

Personal information
- Full name: Yip Ka Yu
- Date of birth: 24 December 1996 (age 29)
- Place of birth: Hong Kong
- Height: 1.90 m (6 ft 3 in)
- Position: Goalkeeper

Team information
- Current team: Rangers (HKG)
- Number: 70

Youth career
- Kwai Tsing

Senior career*
Years	Team	Apps	(Gls)
2014–2015	Kwai Tsing	6	(0)
2015–2017	Rangers (HKG)	0	(0)
2017–2018	Lee Man	0	(0)
2018–2020	Yuen Long	10	(0)
2020	R&F	0	(0)
2020–2021	Eastern District	6	(0)
2021–2022	Leaper MG	8	(0)
2022–2023	Tsuen Wan		
2023	Tsun Tat		
2025–	Rangers (HKG)	28	(0)
Medal record
Men's football
Representing Hong Kong
FIFA ASEAN Challenge Cup
Winner	2026 Hong Kong
- * Club domestic league appearances and goals as of 21 November 2026

Yip Ka Yu (Chinese: 葉嘉宇; born 24 December 1996) is a Hong Kong professional footballer who currently plays as a goalkeeper for Hong Kong Premier League club Rangers.

== Club career ==
In July 2015, Yip joined Rangers.

On 5 August 2017, Yip joined Lee Man.

On 15 July 2018, Yip joined Yuen Long.

On 22 August 2025, Yip returned to professional football and rejoined Rangers.

== International career ==
On 20 March 2026, Yip was called up to the Hong Kong squad for the 2027 AFC Asian Cup qualification match against India.

== Personal life ==
On 5 October 2023, Yip was sentenced to 5 years and 3 months in prison for raping a 17-year-old girl. However, the conviction was overturned and he resumed his football career in August 2025.

== Honours ==
Hong Kong

- FIFA ASEAN Challenge Cup: 2026
