= 2021–22 Hong Kong FA Cup =

Tournament details
- Country: Hong Kong
- Dates: 27 November 2021 – 1 February 2022
- Teams: 8

Final positions
- Champions: None
- Runners-up: None

Tournament statistics
- Matches played: 6
- Goals scored: 14 (2.33 per match)
- Attendance: 7,073 (1,179 per match)

The 2021–22 Hong Kong FA Cup was the 47th edition of the Hong Kong FA Cup. 8 teams entered this edition. The competition was only open to clubs who participate in the 2021–22 Hong Kong Premier League, with lower division sides entering the Junior Division, a separate competition.

The champion received HK$100,000 in prize money and the runners-up will receive HK$40,000. The MVP of the final received a HK$10,000 bonus.

Since the previous edition of the FA Cup was cancelled due to COVID-19 pandemic in Hong Kong, Eastern, the champions of the 2019–20 Hong Kong FA Cup still remains as the defending champions of the competition.

== Calendar ==
Phase	Round	Draw Date	Date	Matches	Clubs
Knockout phase	Quarter-finals	13 November 2021	27–28 November 2021	4	8 → 4
Knockout phase	Semi-finals	13 November 2021	25–26 December 2021 at Mong Kok Stadium	2	4 → 2
Knockout phase	Final	13 November 2021	1 February 2022 at Hong Kong Stadium	1	2 → 1

== Effects of the COVID-19 pandemic ==
On 5 January 2022, the Hong Kong government announced a tightening of social distancing measures between 7 January to 20 January in order to control the Omicron outbreak. Public recreation facilities, such as football pitches, were closed and members of the public were barred from gathering in groups of more than two, making it impossible for the season to continue. The Hong Kong Football Association announced on the same day that it would also postpone any scheduled matches in the successive two week period.

After the measures were extended several times in the successive weeks, the government announced on 22 February that it would extend the measures until 20 April, making it near impossible to complete the season before most player contracts end on 31 May. The HKFA held an emergency meeting with the clubs on 25 February, after which it was determined that the remainder of the season would be cancelled.

== Bracket ==
Quarter-finals
27 November 2021
Resources Capital	0
**Lee Man**	**1**
27 November 2021
**Eastern**	**4**
HK U23	0
28 November 2021
**Rangers**	**4**
HKFC	0
28 November 2021
**Kitchee (a.e.t.)**	**2***
Southern	1

Semi-finals
25 December 2021
Lee Man	0
**Eastern**	**1**
26 December 2021
Rangers	0
**Kitchee**	**1**

Final
1 February 2022
Eastern
Kitchee

Bold = winner
* = after extra time, ( ) = penalty shootout score

== Fixtures and results ==
=== Quarter-finals ===
27 November 2021 QF1	Resources Capital	**0–1**	**Lee Man**	Tai Po Sports Ground
15:00 UTC+8		Report	Ángel 90+6'	Attendance: 421; Referee: Woo Chun Sing

27 November 2021 QF2	**Eastern**	**4–0**	HK U23	Mong Kok Stadium
17:30 UTC+8	Everton 6', 87'; Bertomeu 20'; Dovale 42'	Report		Attendance: 572; Referee: Lau Fong Hei

28 November 2021 QF3	**Rangers**	**4–0**	HKFC	Tsing Yi Sports Ground
15:00 UTC+8	Lo Kwan Yee 14'; Bazán 22', 75'; Lau Chi Lok 80'	Report		Attendance: 237; Referee: Tang Hing Fu

28 November 2021 QF4	**Kitchee**	**2–1** (a.e.t.)	Southern	Mong Kok Stadium
17:30 UTC+8	Damjanović 82'; Alex 93'	Report	Cheng Chin Lung 11'	Attendance: 1,393; Referee: Wong Wai Lun

=== Semi-finals ===
25 December 2021 SF1	Lee Man	**0–1**	**Eastern**	Mong Kok Stadium
16:00 UTC+8		Report	Leung Kwun Chung 45'	Attendance: 2,626; Referee: Liu Kwok Man

26 December 2021 SF2	Rangers	**0–1**	**Kitchee**	Mong Kok Stadium
16:00 UTC+8		Report	Scott 87'	Attendance: 1,824; Referee: Yu Kin Fung

=== Final ===
1 February 2022 F	**Eastern**	**Cancelled**	**Kitchee**	Hong Kong Stadium
16:00 UTC+8		Report

== Top scorers ==
Rank	Player	Club	Goals
1	(Argentina) Leandro Bazán	Rangers	2
1	(Brazil) Everton Camargo	Eastern	2
