= Toby Down =

English-born Hong Kong footballer

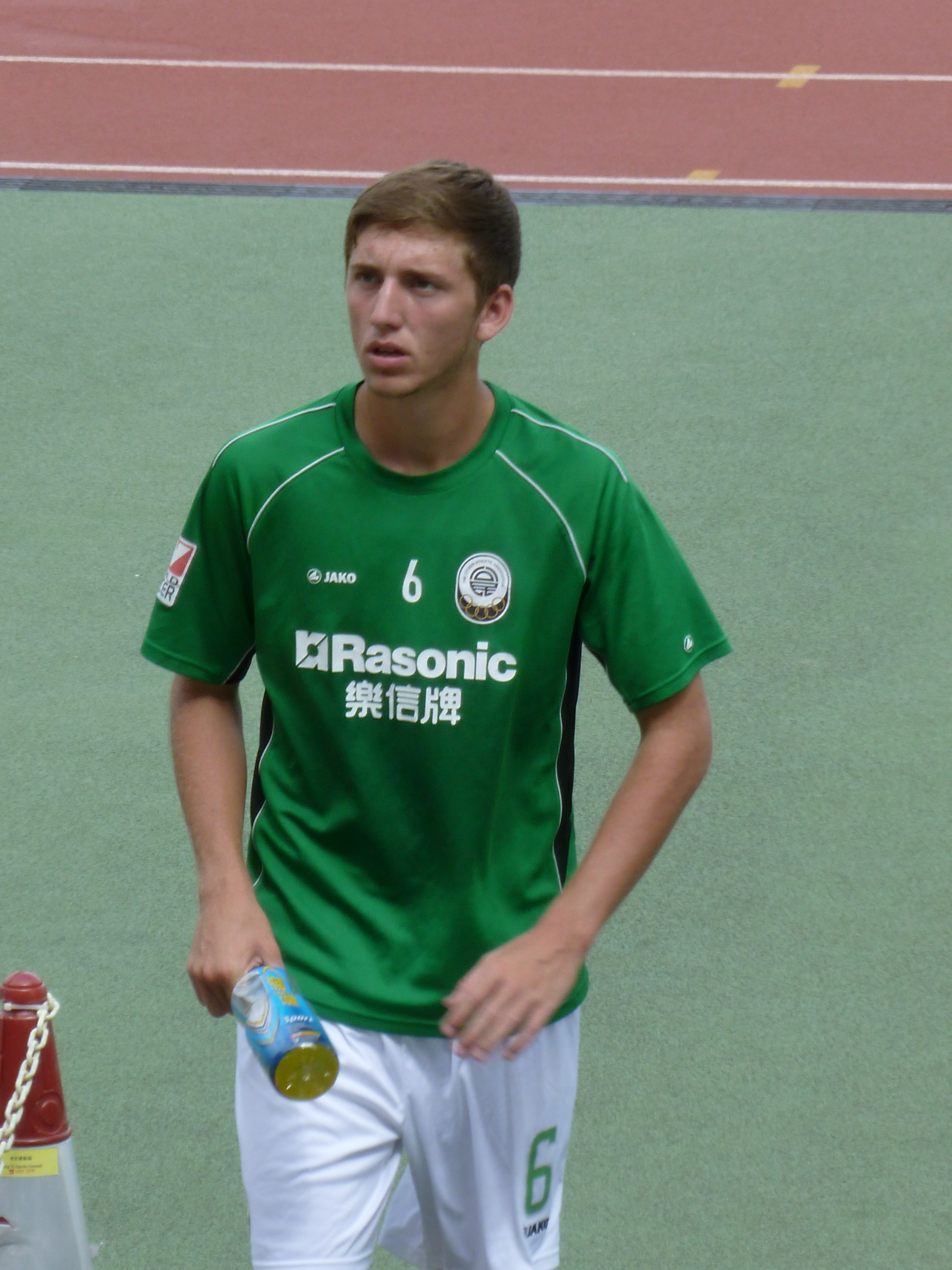
- Down with Citizen in September 2013

Personal information
- Full name: Toby Philip Down
- Date of birth: 3 June 1994 (age 32)
- Place of birth: Ascot, England
- Height: 1.85 m (6 ft 1 in)
- Positions: Defensive midfielder; centre back

Youth career
- Kowloon Cricket Club
- Kitchee
- Sham Shui Po

College career
Years	Team	Apps	(Gls)
2014–2017	Concordia Bulldogs	71	(16)

Senior career*
Years	Team	Apps	(Gls)
2013–2014	Citizen	0	(0)
2018–2020	Tai Po	8	(0)
2020–2022	Eastern	1	(0)
2020–2022	→ Southern (loan)	14	(0)
2023–2024	OFC Wolves		
2024–2026	HKFC	29	(1)
- * Club domestic league appearances and goals as of 16 May 2026

Toby Philip Down (Chinese: 唐道碧; born 3 June 1994) is a former professional footballer who played as a defensive midfielder or a centre back. Born in England, he received his HKSAR passport in January 2020.

== Club career ==
Down moved to Hong Kong at the age of 3 with his family. He played junior football for the Kowloon Cricket Club in the HKJFL, until moving into the local football set up with Kitchee and then Sham Shui Po. After attending secondary school in King George V School he had a trial period with Wycombe Wanderers in 2013, making 1 appearance in a pre-season friendly.

Down started his senior career at Citizen, making his senior debut in the Hong Kong FA Cup playing the last nine minutes in a 3–0 win over Sun Source.

Down then attended Concordia University to study marketing and play for the men's football team. In September 2015, he scored the first hat-trick for his side since October 2013.

After four years in America, Down returned to Hong Kong to join Tai Po. On 2 September 2018, he made his Hong Kong Premier League debut for Tai Po, playing the last 20 minutes in a 4–4 draw with Yuen Long.

On 6 July 2020, Down joined fellow Hong Kong Premier League club Eastern.

On 15 October 2020, Southern acquired Down on loan for the season.

On 9 July 2022, Down left Eastern.

In 2024, he was playing for United Premier Soccer League side OFC Wolves.

On 31 July 2024, it was confirmed that Down would join HKFC, having last played in Hong Kong since 2022.

On 16 May 2026, Down announced his retirement from professional football.

== International career ==
In January 2020, it was reported that Down had received his HKSAR passport after giving up his British passport, making him eligible to represent Hong Kong internationally.

== Personal life ==
Down was born in Ascot, England and has four siblings. He competed in both rugby and athletics when he was younger.

== Career statistics ==
=== Club ===
As of match played 22 March 2020.

Appearances and goals by club, season and competition
Club	Season	League			FA Cup		Senior Shield		Other		Total	
Club	Season	Division	Apps	Goals	Apps	Goals	Apps	Goals	Apps	Goals	Apps	Goals
Citizen	2013–14	Hong Kong First Division	0	0	1	0	0	0	0	0	1	0
Tai Po	2018–19	Hong Kong Premier League	2	0	0	0	1	0	4 (Note: Appearances in Community Cup & Sapling Cup)	0	7	0
Tai Po	2019–20	Hong Kong Premier League	6	0	2	0	3	0	3 (Note: Appearances in Sapling Cup)	0	14	0
Career total			8	0	3	0	4	0	7	0	22	0

== Honours ==
Tai Po

- Hong Kong Premier League: 2018–19
