= Lee Chun Yin =

Hong Kong footballer

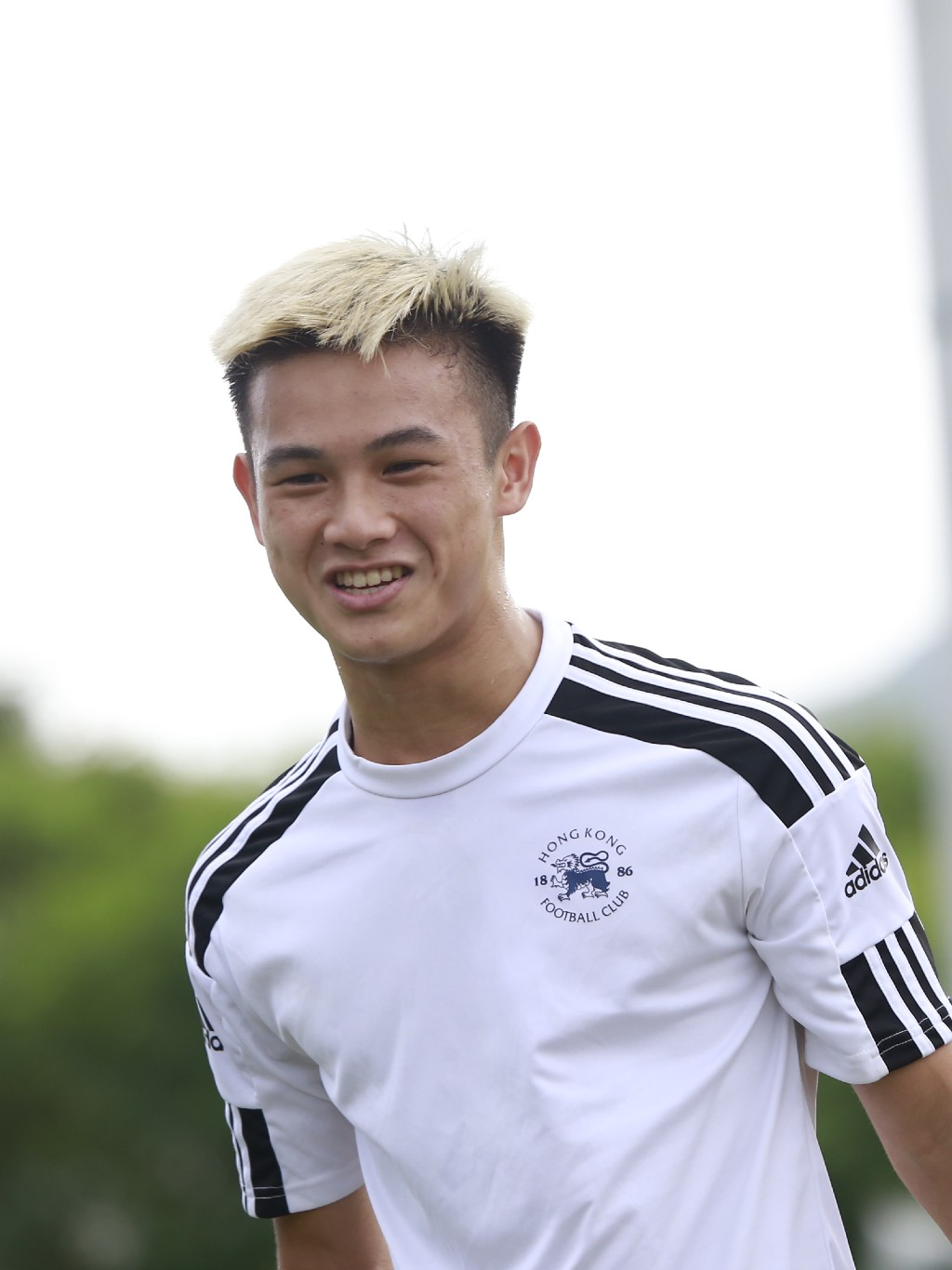

Personal information
- Full name: Ryan Lee Chun Yin
- Date of birth: 12 July 2004 (age 22)
- Place of birth: Shatin, Hong Kong
- Height: 1.71 m (5 ft 7 in)
- Position: Defensive midfielder

Youth career
- –2022: CFCSSHK

Senior career*
Years	Team	Apps	(Gls)
2022	South China	0	(0)
2022–2023	HK U23	9	(0)
2023–2025	HKFC	18	(0)
2025–	South China	21	(2)
- * Club domestic league appearances and goals as of 16 May 2027

Ryan Lee Chun Yin (Chinese: 李俊諺; born 12 July 2004) is a Hong Kong former professional footballer who played as a defensive midfielder.

== Club career ==
On 29 July 2023, HKFC announced the arrival of Lee.

== Career statistics ==
=== Club ===
Appearances and goals by club, season and competition
Club	Season	League			Cup		League Cup		Total	
Club	Season	Division	Apps	Goals	Apps	Goals	Apps	Goals	Apps	Goals
HK U23	2022–23	Premier League	9	0	2	0	7 (Note: Appearances in the Sapling Cup)	0	18	0
Career total			9	0	2	0	7	0	18	0
