= Brian Fok =

Hong Kong footballer

Personal information
- Full name: Brian Fok
- Date of birth: 8 March 1994 (age 32)
- Place of birth: Kaduna, Nigeria
- Height: 1.90 m (6 ft 3 in)
- Position: Centre back

Youth career
- 1999: Kaduna Football Academy
- 2004: HKFC Soccer Section
- 2009: Yau Tsim Mong
- 2010: Rangers (HKG)
- 2012: Brooke House College
- 2013: Jamie Lawrence Football Academy

Senior career*
Years	Team	Apps	(Gls)
2010–2011	Rangers (HKG)	6	(0)
2011–2012	Rangers (HKG)	3	(0)
2014–2019	Shanghai Shenhua	0	(0)
2015	→ CF Cracks (loan)	6	(0)
2016	→ ACS Berceni (loan)	0	(0)
2016	→ AZAL (loan)	4	(0)
2018	→ Juventud (loan)	0	(0)
2018–2019	→ Académico Viseu (loan)	0	(0)
2019–2020	Kitchee	0	(0)
2021–2022	HKFC	0	(0)
2022–2023	Happy Valley	24	(6)

International career
2010–2012	Hong Kong U17		
2012–2014	Hong Kong U20		
2014–2017	Hong Kong U23	14	(1)
- * Club domestic league appearances and goals

Brian Fok (Chinese: 霍斌仁; born 8 March 1994) is a former professional footballer who played as a centre back. Born in Nigeria, he represented Hong Kong at youth level.

== Club career ==
Born in Kaduna, Nigeria to a Nigerian Yoruba mother and a Hong Kongese father, Brian started to have professional football training in Kaduna Football Academy at the age of 5. In 2004, he moved from Nigeria to Hong Kong. After moving in Hong Kong, Brian trained and played for the youth football team of HKFC Soccer Section, Yau Tsim Mong and Hong Kong Rangers. Brian completed his high school education at Sir Ellis Kadoorie Secondary School (West Kowloon). Brian was also the 200 meter dash champion for 4 years running at the Hong Kong Schools Sports Federation (HKSSF) Athletics Meet.

In 2010, Fok played as an amateur for Rangers in Hong Kong Second Division. In 2011, Brian rejoined Rangers and made his professional debut in February 2012 as a late substitute against Tai Po. On 20 May 2012, Brian started as line-up against Kitchee and played for the whole match which they lost 1–4.

In 2012, Fok studied in England at the Brooke House College Football Academy for 1-year professional football training. In 2013, Brian moved to train and play for Jamie Lawrence Football Academy.

In 2014, Fok went for trial at Chinese Super League club Shanghai Shenhua, going on to sign a three-year deal with the club.

In December 2014, Fok joined Spanish Club CF Cracks on a half season loan, played 6 matches for the club as a centre back and also as a centre forward.

In February 2016, Shanghai Shenhua allowed Brian to join Berceni on a half season loan to gain first team experience.

In August 2016, Fok joined Azerbaijan Premier League club AZAL PFK on a half season loan deal, making his debut as a substitute in a 3–0 defeat to Gabala on 19 September 2016. The appearance meant Fok was the first Hong Kong player to play in Azerbaijan and the 4th Hong Kong player to play in Europe. On 6 November 2016, Brian started and played full match against Gabala, the match ended at a draw 0:0. Fok left AZAL on 24 December 2016 following the conclusion of his loan.

On 21 February 2018, Fok joined Uruguayan Segunda División club Juventud on a half season loan.

On 13 August 2018, Fok signed a 2 years deal and transferred to LigaPro club Académico de Viseu.

On 15 July 2019, Fok returned to Hong Kong and signed for Hong Kong Premier League club Kitchee. He played his first game for the club on 10 September 2019 against Lee Man in a Senior Shield match, in which Kitchee was beaten 5-1 and Fok was substituted in the 2nd half.

In October 2020, Fok retired from professional football. However, he came out of retirement in 2021 when he joined newly promoted HKFC for the 2021–22 season of the HKPL.

== 2021 Hong Kong match-fixing scandal ==
In October 2021, Fok offered bribes to fellow HKFC players Jean Maciel and Marcus McMillan to deliberate lose against Hong Kong Rangers in an upcoming match. However, both players rejected the offer and reported it to the club. In May 2023, the ICAC arrested 11 footballers, including Fok, over suspicions of illegal gambling and match manipulation.

On 15 February 2024, Fok was charged by ICAC for match-fixing. He was convicted along with fellow player Luciano on 8 May 2026 for three counts of offering an advantage to an agent and two counts of conspiracy to cheat at gambling.. The ICAC investigation uncovered that Fok, Luciano and a bookmaker placed bets on more than 30 Hong Kong First Division matches worth at least tens of thousands of Hong Kong dollars.

On 29 May 2026, Fok was sentenced to 17 months' imprisonment.

== International career ==
Since 2005, Brian has been playing for different age groups of Hong Kong National youth team.

== Honours ==
Kitchee

- Hong Kong Premier League: 2019–20
