= Alexandre Dujardin =

Hong Kong footballer (born 1998)

Alexandre Dujardin 杜國樑
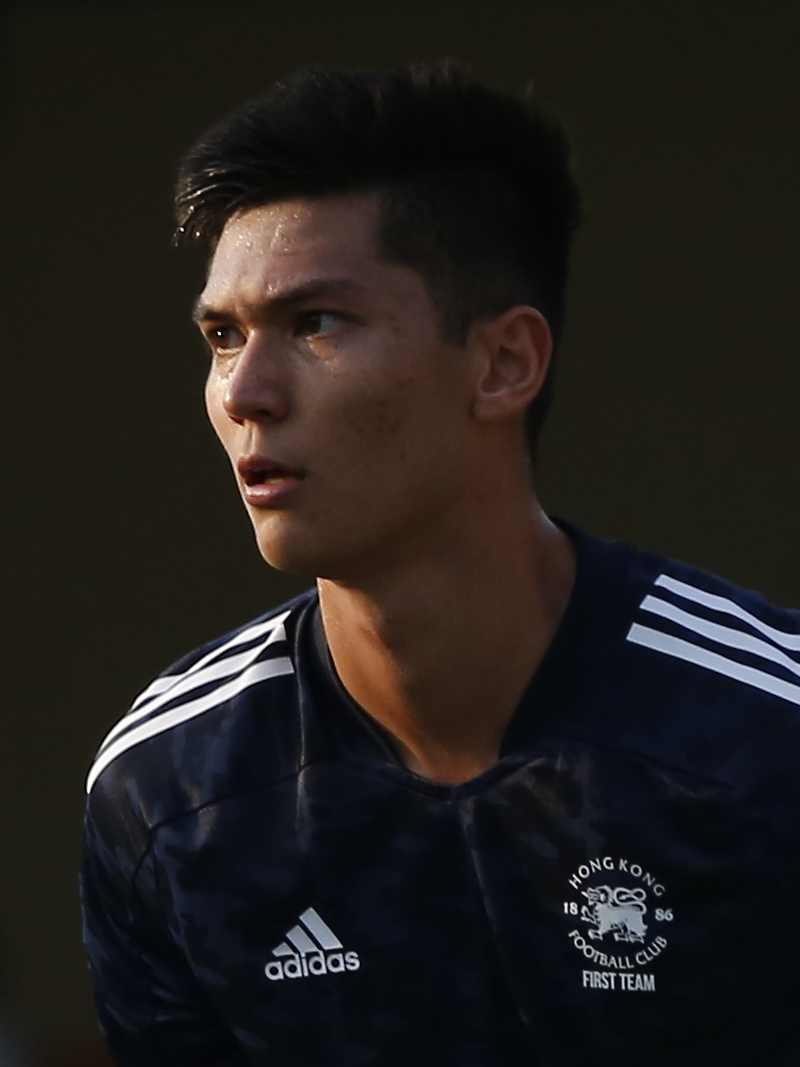
- Alex with HKFC

Personal information
- Full name: Alexandre Dujardin
- Date of birth: 24 December 1998 (age 27)
- Place of birth: Hong Kong
- Height: 1.95 m (6 ft 5 in)
- Positions: Centre back; defensive midfielder

Team information
- Current team: HKFC
- Number: 4

Youth career
- Kitchee
- 2012–2014: Yokohama FC Hong Kong
- 2014–2016: South China

Senior career*
| Years | Team | Apps | (Gls) |
| 2016–2017 | HKFC | 3 | (0) |
| 2020–2021 | Kitchee | 0 | (0) |
| 2021 | ASA Issy | | |
| 2022–2023 | HKFC | 16 | (1) |
| 2023–2024 | HK U23 | 11 | (0) |
| 2024–2025 | Nanjing City | 15 | (0) |
| 2025–2026 | Tai Po | 6 | (0) |
| 2026– | HKFC | 5 | (0) |
- * Club domestic league appearances and goals as of 8 November 2026

Alexandre Dujardin (Chinese: 杜國樑; born 24 December 1998) is a Hong Kong professional footballer who currently plays as a centre back for Hong Kong Premier League club HKFC.

== Club career ==
=== Kitchee ===
On 20 November 2020, Dujardin joined Kitchee.

=== ASA Issy ===
In 2021, Alex joined French club ASA Issy to further his development with football.

=== HKFC ===
In January 2022, Dujardin joined HKFC.

=== HK U23 ===
On 4 July 2023, Dujardin joined HK U23.

=== Nanjing City ===
On 2 March 2024, Dujardin joined China League One club Nanjing City.

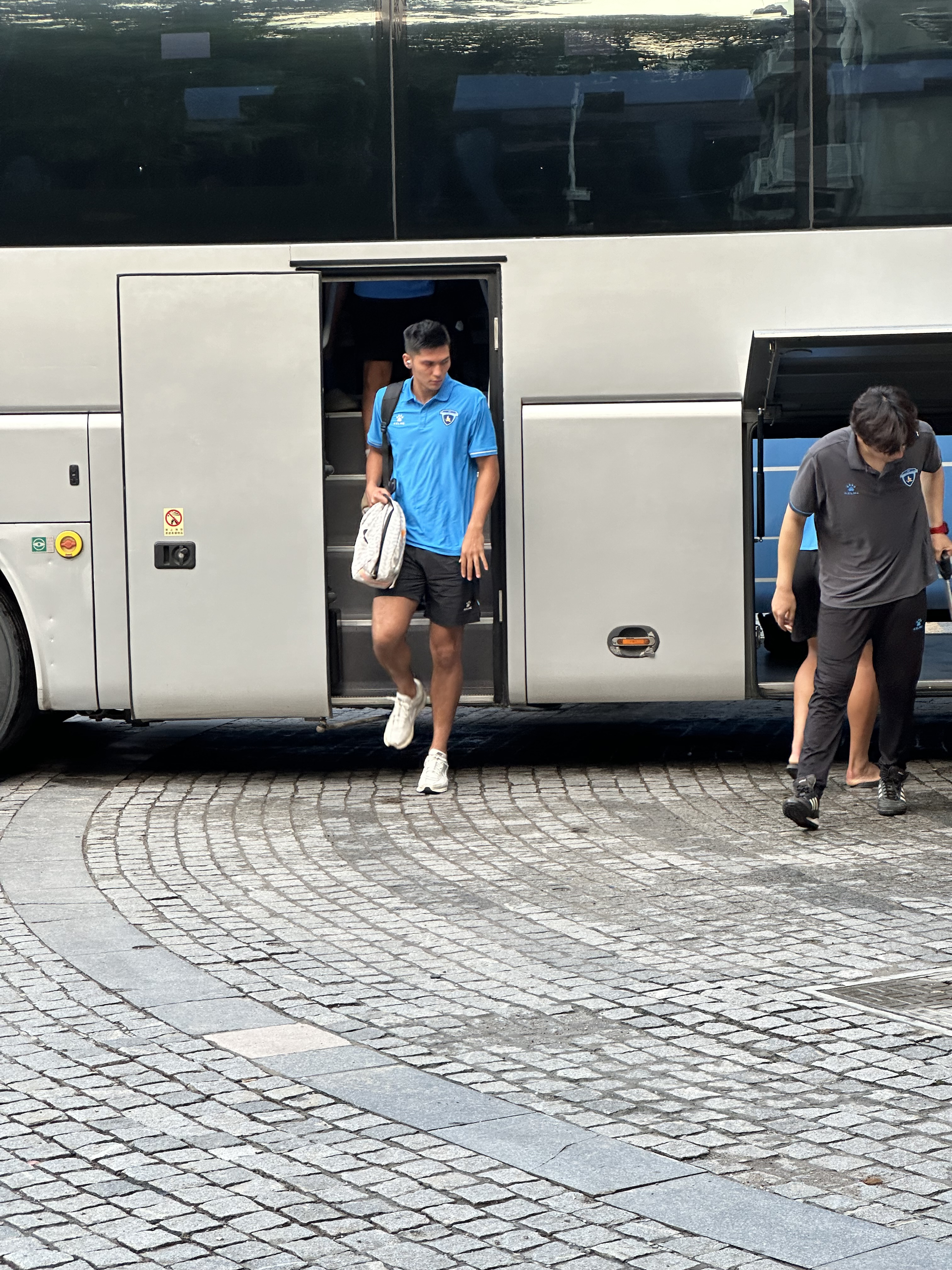
Dujardin in Nanjing City colours.

=== Tai Po ===
On 20 September 2025, Dujardin returned to Hong Kong and joined Tai Po.

=== HKFC ===
On 21 August 2026, Dujardin returned to HKFC after 3 years.

== Personal life ==
Dujardin's elder brother Remi is also a professional footballer and is a Hong Kong international currently playing for China League One club Nantong Zhiyun. They were born to a French father and a Taiwanese mother. During the 2022 season, the brothers played on opposing sides for the first time when Alexandre played for HKFC and Remi played for Sham Shui Po.

== Honours ==
Tai Po

- Hong Kong FA Cup: 2025–26
- Hong Kong Senior Shield: 2025–26

== Career statistics ==
=== Club ===
As of 6 February 2021

| Club | Season | League | | | National Cup | | League Cup | | Continental | | Other | | Total | |
| Club | Season | Division | Apps | Goals | Apps | Goals | Apps | Goals | Apps | Goals | Apps | Goals | Apps | Goals |
|---|---|---|---|---|---|---|---|---|---|---|---|---|---|---|
| HKFC | 2016–17 | Hong Kong Premier League | 3 | 0 | 0 | 0 | 0 | 0 | – | | 0 | 0 | 3 | 0 |
| Kitchee | 2020–21 | Hong Kong Premier League | 0 | 0 | 0 | 0 | 0 | 0 | – | | 0 | 0 | 0 | 0 |
| Career total | | | 3 | 0 | 0 | 0 | 0 | 0 | 0 | 0 | 0 | 0 | 3 | 0 |
