= Chancy Cooke =

South African football manager (born 1985)

Personal information
- Date of birth: 6 September 1985 (age 41)
- Place of birth: South Africa

Team information
- Current team: HKFC

Managerial career
- Years: Team
- 2009–2013: MFA Taiwan (youth)
- 2014–2021: Asia Pacific Soccer Schools (youth)
- 2021–2022: Southern (assistant)
- 2022–2023: Hong Kong U20
- 2023–: HKFC (youth)
- 2024–2026: HKFC

Chancy Cooke (born 6 September 1985) is a South African professional football manager who holds an AFC Pro Licence and a Uefa A Licence.

== Early life ==
Cooke was born on 6 September 1985 in Tsumeb, Namibia (South West Africa) then moved to Cape Town, South Africa. Growing up, he attended Paul Roos Gimnasium & Wynberg Boys High School and studied Industrial Design at the Cape Peninsula University of Technology

== Career ==
In 2009, Cooke was appointed as a youth manager of Taiwanese side MFA Taiwan. Following his stint there, he was appointed as a youth manager of Hong Kong side Asia Pacific Soccer Schools. During the summer of 2021, he was appointed as an assistant manager of Hong Kong side Southern. One year later, he was appointed manager of the Hong Kong national under-20 football team.

Ahead of the 2024–25 season, he was appointed manager of Hong Kong side HKFC, helping the club reach the semi-finals of the 2024–25 Hong Kong FA Cup.
