= Dominic Johns =

Australian soccer player

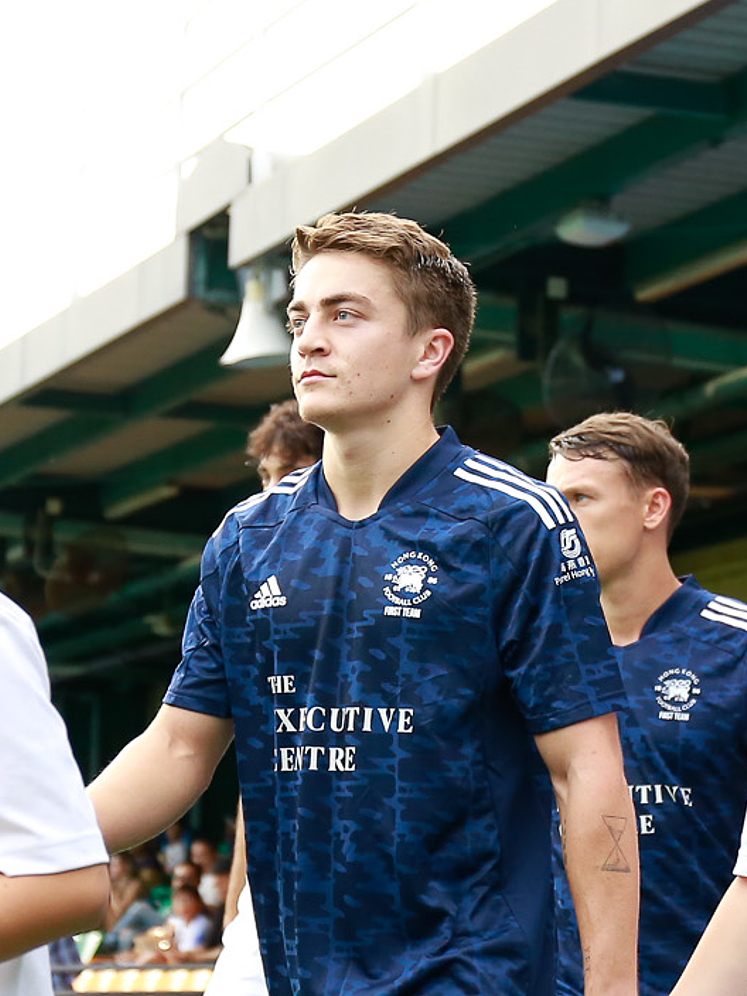
- Dom with HKFC in 2023

Personal information
- Full name: Dominic Sy Johns
- Date of birth: 12 April 2000 (age 26)
- Place of birth: Australia
- Height: 1.70 m (5 ft 7 in)
- Position: Winger

Team information
- Current team: HKFC
- Number: 11

Youth career
- Benfica de Macau
- CCM Academy
- 2017–2019: NWS Youth

Senior career*
Years	Team	Apps	(Gls)
2019–2023	NWS Spirit	7	(0)
2023–2024	HKFC	11	(2)
2025–	HKFC	11	(1)
- * Club domestic league appearances and goals as of 8 November 2026

Dominic Sy Johns (born 12 April 2000), or simply known as Dom Johns, is an Australian professional soccer player who currently plays as a winger for Hong Kong Premier League club HKFC.

== Club career ==
=== Early career ===
Johns was part of the Central Coast Mariners Academy and Benfica de Macau youth for quite some time in his youth years as he resided in Macau until he was nine.

=== NWS Spirit ===
Johns was promoted to the NWS Spirit senior squad in 2019 following good performances in the under-20's.

=== HKFC ===
In August 2023, Johns signed for Hong Kong Premier League club HKFC on a free transfer from NWS Spirit following his end of contract. He previously attended trials at Eastern but ultimately was signed by HKFC following good performances in pre-season.

On 17 September 2023, Johns scored in his debut for the club in a 1–0 victory over Sham Shui Po in a league match.

On 15 October 2023, Johns scored his second for the club in a 2–1 defeat to Tai Po in the Hong Kong Sapling Cup. However, he was unable to recover a point for his club.

On 12 May 2024, Johns suffered a horrible leg fracture during a league match against North District.

On 1 August 2025, Johns rejoined HKFC after recovering from injuries.

== Career statistics ==
=== Club ===
As of 28 October 2023

Appearances and goals by club, season and competition
Club	Season	League			FA Cup		Sapling Cup		Others		Total	
Club	Season	Division	Apps	Goals	Apps	Goals	Apps	Goals	Apps	Goals	Apps	Goals
HKFC	2023–24	Hong Kong Premier League	6	2	0 (Note: Appearances in the Hong Kong FA Cup)	0	9 (Note: Appearances in the Hong Kong Sapling Cup)	3	1 (Note: Appearances in the Hong Kong Senior Challenge Shield)	0	4	2
HKFC	Total		6	2	0	0	9	3	1	0	16	5
Career total			6	2	0	0	9	3	1	0	16	5

== Honours ==
=== NWS Spirit ===
- Waratah Cup: 2022

== Personal life ==
Johns was born of Australian-English descent through his parents. His mom was born in Hong Kong. However, he did not receive any form of citizenship. Besides Australian and British citizenship, Johns also holds Macau residency due to his residing in Macau until he moved back to Australia.
