= Shunsuke Nakamura (footballer, born 1983) =

Japanese association football player

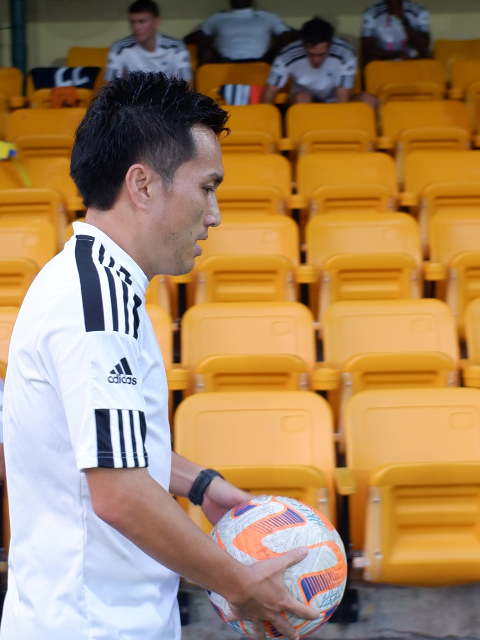

Personal information
- Full name: Shunsuke Nakamura
- Date of birth: 8 November 1983 (age 43)
- Place of birth: Osaka, Japan
- Height: 1.67 m (5 ft 6 in)
- Position: Forward

Senior career*
Years	Team	Apps	(Gls)
2016–2023	HKFC	45	(15)
- * Club domestic league appearances and goals as of 7 May 2023

Shunsuke Nakamura (中村 俊輔, Nakamura Shunsuke; born 8 November 1983) is a former Japanese professional footballer who played as a forward.

== Club career ==
=== HKFC ===
On 7 May 2023, Shunsuke announced his retirement from professional football following a 2–1 home victory to Southern to cap off a flying 2022–23 season, ending his playing career and time at HKFC.
