= HKFC (football club) =

Association football club in Hong Kong

HKFC 港會
- Full name: Hong Kong Football Club
- Nickname: Chinese: 港會
- Short name: HKFC
- Founded: February 12, 1886; 140 years ago
- Ground: Hong Kong Football Club Stadium
- Capacity: 2,750
- Chairman: Mark Grainger
- Head coach: Darren Arnott
- League: Hong Kong Premier League
- 2025–26: Hong Kong Premier League, 10th of 10
- Website: www.hkfc.com
Home colours	Away colours

The football section of Hong Kong Football Club (Abbreviation: HKFC; Chinese: 香港足球會) sports club fields a range of teams at various age divisions in Hong Kong leagues. Their football team currently competes in the Hong Kong Premier League.

== History ==
While the football team has won many titles in the second-tier competition in recent years, they have rarely enjoyed success when playing against professional sides in the First Division. In 1980 however, the club managed to avoid relegation from the professional First Division for the first time in their history. One of the highlights of the season was a 1–1 draw with eventual champions Seiko SA. On 10 May 1980 at the HK Government Stadium CLUB defeated Kui Tan 1–0 with an 87th-minute penalty scored by John McGunnigle, meaning Kui Tan joined Yuen Long in the drop that year.

In the past few years, HKFC opted not to take promotion to the First Division. In 2006, finally, the club accepted the promotion after winning the Second Division. After showing initial promise, they lost 4 league matches in a row between March and April 2007 and were relegated to the Second Division. They did however become champions of the Second Division again in April 2010 and returned to the First Division. Therefore, HKFC is known as the yo-yo club in Hong Kong.

=== Rise to the Hong Kong Premier League ===
==== 2016–17 Season ====
In 2016, two years after the establishment of the fully professional Hong Kong Premier League, HKFC finally decided to seek promotion to the top flight after finishing as runners-up behind Tai Po in the 2015–16 season. Their stay in the top flight only lasted a single season. Their first HKPL season saw them only collect 2 wins and 6 points in 20 league games and saw themselves finishing bottom of the league with a staggering -64 goal difference. The club also recorded one of the biggest losses in their history with a 10-0 thumping to Kitchee, becoming the highest scoring match of the season.

HKFC won the First Division for the first time in a century during the 2017–18 season, going unbeaten throughout the entire league campaign. The club declined promotion as they did not want to field a professional side.

=== Return to the Hong Kong Premier League ===
==== 2021–22 Season ====
After being crowned champions of the 2020–21 Hong Kong First Division League, on 19 August 2021, HKFC accepted the HKFA's invitation to be promoted to the 2021–22 Hong Kong Premier League, after the withdrawals of Happy Valley and Pegasus, having last appeared five years ago in the 2016–17 season. The team then signed experienced players such as Brian Fok, To Chun Kiu, Oliver Laxton and Chris Chung to add quality to the squad in pre-season. Following the season being cut-off by the COVID-19 pandemic, the club by then had recorded a 6th-place finish in the league with 4 rounds in and 1 point. A poor showing in the Sapling Cup and FA Cup did not help much as they lacked quality.

==== 2022–23 Season ====
Prior to the start of the 2022–23 season, the club announced the crucial signings of striker Paul Ngue, others such as Alexandre Dujardin, Siu Ka Ming, Ng Tsz Chung, Emmet Wan, and Jack Sealy were brought in to help restructure the senior squad and increase their chances of survival. The club then bid farewell to goalkeeper To Chun Kiu, who left for fellow Premier League club Sham Shui Po and defender Brian Fok who retired. A number of youth talents from the club's youth teams were promoted, notably Timothy Chow, Raphaël Merkies and goalkeeper Fung Long Hin.

The team would collect all 3 points in their season opener to Sham Shui Po in a 1–0 victory with a penalty scored by Paul Ngue to settle the score. HKFC, however, fell short in their second game as they fell to a 5-0 thumping by Kitchee in the Senior Shield. HKFC then saw the arrival of experienced attacking player Paulinho joining the team with him making his debut in a historical 4–2 comeback to Tai Po in a 2022–23 Hong Kong Sapling Cup game, scoring twice and assisting Henry Moore for the equalizing goal.

On February 5, 2023, goalkeeper Freddie Toomer became the first goalkeeper in the Hong Kong Premier League history to score a goal as he netted an acrobatic bicycle kick in the 90+6 minute to help the club equalize and salvage a point in a 1–1 draw to Resources Capital. The match between Kitchee and HKFC at HKFC Stadium became the first game in the club's history to become a sellout, however, HKFC came on the losing end in a 3-0 humbling.

Following the club's 2–0 victory over Sham Shui Po on 19 February 2023, the club broke their records as they recorded a 21-point finish following the game, breaking the former record of 20 points in the top-tier league way back in 1963. Following their 1–0 loss to Eastern and the confirmation of their final league position, it was announced that another record had been broken as they had made history by finishing in 6th place, 5 places above the original record of 11th place back in the 2016–17 Hong Kong Premier League season. The club then finished the season on a high with a 2–1 victory over Southern with goals from Thiago and Timothy Chow sealing the victory, the match was also the final professional game for club legend Freek Schipper and veteran striker Shunsuke Nakamura.

Star goalkeeper Freddie Toomer's overhead equalizer against Resources Capital would win goal of the season from on.cc.

==== 2023–24 Season ====
Prior to the start of the 2023–24 season, the club said farewell to Raphaël Merkies and Alexandre Dujardin. Yue Yi Xing was also revealed to have joined HK U23 on a free transfer in search of gametime. Jahangir Khan was then leaked to have signed for the club following a Hong Kong national team call-up announcement. In addition to Khan, the club also secured signings of former Southern defender Lau Hok Ming, Harima Hirokane, Jordon Brown on loan from Kitchee along with young players Lee Chun Yin, Maddox Kong, Stefan Antonic and Calum Bloxham to their ranks. Foreigners Dominic Johns who was formerly on trial with fellow HKPL club Eastern was signed alongside Costa Rican-English defender Felix Perez-Doyle.

The team would fall miserably to Kitchee in a 8–0 thrashing on season opening, goalkeeper Issey Maholo was also forced off the pitch due to injury and on came striker Paul Ngue having to step up to go in goal due to the team having no reserve goalkeeper. The team picked up their first win of the league campaign in a 1–0 outing victory against Sham Shui Po away before going on to lose the Hong Kong FA Cup tie to the latter. The team would go on a 5-game, no-win streak across all competitions before claiming a dominant 4–1 win over Resources Capital at home following goals from 4 different players. HKFC crashed out of the Sapling Cup with a humbling 12 points in 10 games.

Defender Siu Ka Ming would depart the club for Kowloon City on a free in early January with Maddox Kong and Hirokane Harima both departing on a free transfer citing personal reasons. Goalkeeper Fung Long Hin returned to the squad following a major absence in the goalkeeping department. The club would continue on a poor run of form, picking up only 9 points in the league from January across 11 games, with the most attention being a 1–0 home humbling of North District with the sole goal scored by a 42-year-old Paulinho, the game was a heated tussle for both sides as winger Dominic Johns suffered a horror injury following serious foul play by the North District defender which lead to an uproar in the HKFC side to avenge their teammate. The club finished the 2023–24 season in 7th place following a boring 0–0 tie to Sham Shui Po at Aberdeen Sports Ground with goalkeeper Fung Long Hin coming on as a winger as the club only brought him as the sole substitute.

Paulinho retired following the end of the season.

==== 2024–25 Season ====
Rumours of the club relegating ahead of the 2024–25 season surfaced online with the sources close the club claiming a verdict would be decided by the week after 29 May and was optimistic regarding the team's chances of remaining in the Hong Kong Premier League. Defender Timothy Chow left the club for HKPL side Lee Man.

On 31 July 2024, the club held a pre-season conference in which Chancy Cooke replaced Tony Hamilton-Bram as the new head coach. Whilst the club were also able to retain some of their experienced players from last season, they had acquired a number fresh players from Toby Down who was part of the Tai Po team that won their first Hong Kong Premier League title, former Hong Kong international Andrew Russell as well as the additions of young players which include the likes of Lai Hoi To, Wong Sum Chit, Ho Ka Chi and Lam Chi Fung.

==== 2025–26 Season ====
After a disappointing campaign during the 2024–25 season, the club announced a number of departures with Andy Russell as well as the retirements of Freddie Toomer and Jack Sealy. The club had acquired 16 fresh players into their squad that included the return of Australian winger Dominic Johns, who last played for the club during the 2023–24 season having sustained a serious injury that had ruled him out of football for a while, as well as drafting in youngsters like Luis Salzmann, Ho Tung Lam and Law Cheuk Hei to the squad. The side finished last despite upbeat results in the later stages of the season. Veteran Toby Down announced his retirement from football for a second time as he sought pastures new in his career, head coach Chancy Cooke also announced his re-designation to become the club's youth coach once more, ending his 2-year stint as the head coach of the men's first team. Debutant WIlliam Mirwasser was hailed as a frontrunner for the Young Player of The Season due to his rout of form amid the club's lowly league position, with the Frenchman stating his desires to pursue a higher level of football. Youngster Pau Anglada would make his senior debut on the final day of the season, playing a role in a 1–1 draw to Kowloon City. Naveed Khan was named as the club's top scorer, recording 5 goals in 20 Premier League appearances.

==== 2026–27 Season ====
After the club was reprieved from relegation, Englishman and former Hong Kong youth head coach Darren Arnott was appointed as their new head coach succeeding Chancey Cooke.

In addition, the club made significant signings, which consisted of experienced players from Ryota Hayashi, Yiu Ho Ming, Manolo Bleda and resigning Alexandre Dujardin and Habib Bah. The club also acquired former England U16 international Charlie Weston, who was once teammates with Jay Haddow at Blackburn Rovers youth team and former Republic of Ireland U19 international Cian Coleman, who once played for Leeds United's youth team under Darren Arnott.

== HKFC Soccer Sevens ==
The team is known outside Hong Kong for being the host of the annual HKFC Soccer Sevens youth-team seven-a-side tournament which attracts high-profile teams such as Chelsea, Manchester United, Aston Villa and Celtic.

Following a 3-year postponement, it was announced the soccer sevens would make a return in 2023, with teams such as Brighton, Fulham, and Glasgow Rangers youth teams invite to the tournament. Les Ferdinand was also invited as the main guest of the drawing of teams during the 2023 edition of the tournament. He was spotted overseeing youth teams of HKFC and even interacted with some of the youth players.

== Stadium ==
=== Hong Kong Football Club Stadium ===
The stadium was situated adjacent to the racecourse. But in 1995, as part of a redevelopment of the racecourse, the club moved into a brand new, 64,000 square meter, purpose-built home, with the main building being outside the race track, and the main pitch, all-weather hockey pitch, bowling green, and sports bar being inside the racetrack.

The stadium is currently used for the club's youth pathways teams, senior and youth rugby team and also serves as the home stadium of Lucky Mile FC. Aside from hosting regular league games, the stadium is also the host stadium of the annual HKFC Soccer Sevens which is a seven-a-side tournament with teams joining all over the world.

The stadium holds a home sellout record of 1,720 sold tickets during the 3–0 defeat of HKFC against Kitchee in the 2022–23 Hong Kong Premier League season.

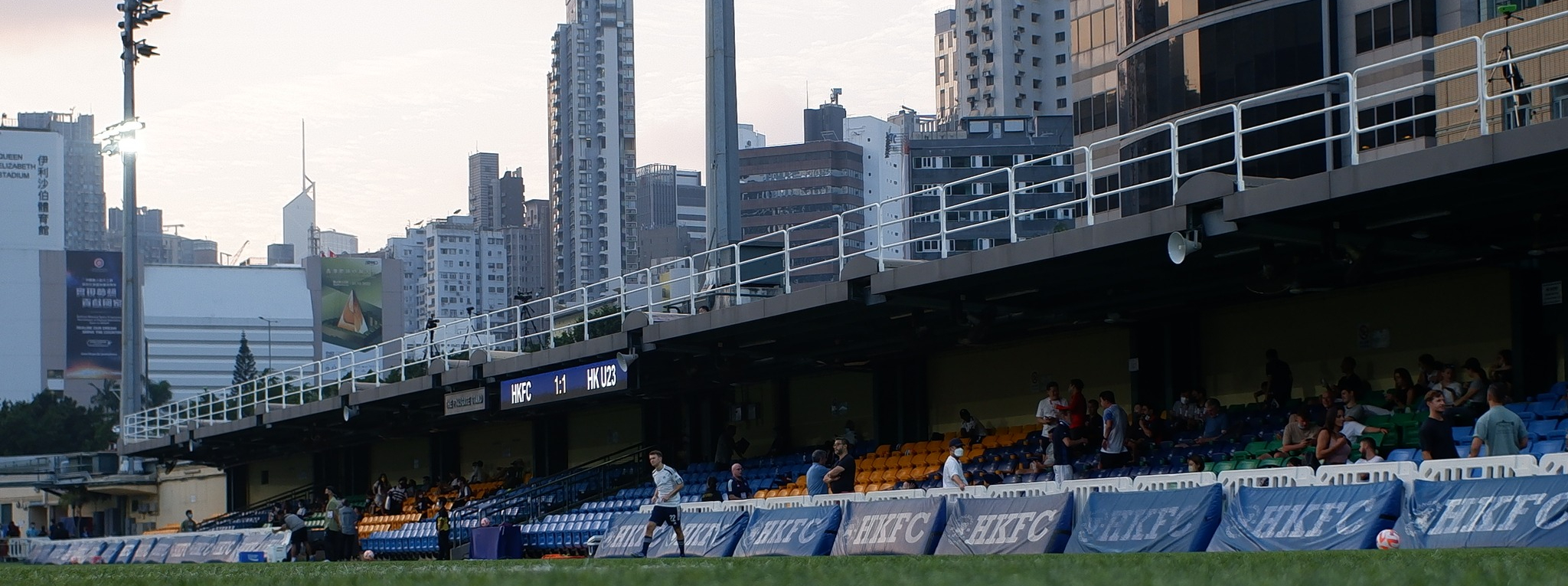
Pitchside view of the HKFC Stadium, October 2022

== Players ==
=== Current squad ===
As of 4 September 2026

Note: Flags indicate national team as defined under FIFA eligibility rules; some limited exceptions apply. Players may hold more than one non-FIFA nationality.

No.	Pos.	Nation	Player
2	DF	HKG	Herman Yeung
3	DF	HKG	Calum Bloxham
4	DF	HKG	Alexandre Dujardin
5	DF	JPN	Ryota Hayashi
6	MF	GUI	Habib Bah
7	MF	USA	Leo Montesinos
8	MF	ENG	Charlie Weston (captain)
9	FW	HKG	Manolo Bleda
10	MF	IRL	Cian Coleman
11	FW	AUS	Dominic Johns
12	DF	HKG	Kwan Hoi Chun
14	FW	HKG	Ho Tung Lam
16	MF	HKG	Oscar Benavides
17	FW	HKG	Leung Tsz Hin
18	GK	HKG	Mak Tsz Hin
19	DF	HKG	Yiu Ho Ming
22	DF	HKG	Jim Ho Chun
24	MF	HKG	Max Chan

No.	Pos.	Nation	Player
25	GK	HKG	Poon Sheung Hei (on loan from Lee Man)
28	MF	HKG	Andy Wong
36	MF	ESP	Pau Anglada
39	FW	HKG	Lai Hok Chun
40	MF	ENG	Nicholas Kedwards
44	FW	SCO	Jack Bennie
66	GK	HKG	Chan Yu Chun
67	FW	SCO	Cai McGunnigle
71	MF	HKG	Li Chung Hang
75	DF	FRA	William Mirwasser
77	DF	HKG	Maxwell Dowding
78	DF	ITA	Diego Zanelli
94	MF	POR	Jean Maciel
95	GK	HKG	Wong Tsz Chung
96	FW	IND	Rishaan Kulkarni
97	DF	HKG	Lam Ho Hei
99	MF	HKG	Chan Ho Ka

== Club officials ==
=== Soccer section committee ===
Position	Staff
Chairman	Mark Grainger
Captain	Graeme Lane
Representative	Alan Morgan
Secretary	Adrian Martin
Treasurer	Paul Ewing
Membership secretary	Greg Medhurst
Social convener	Perry Ng
Communications officer	George Yang
Section coach	Chancy Cooke
First team representative	James Beacher
Lucky Mile representative	Shinnosuke Kawasaki
Junior representative	Nam Nguyen

=== Coaching staff ===
Senior team

Position	Staff
Head coach	Darren Arnott
Assistant coach	Gilles Meyer
Technical Coach	Anto Grabo

== Development squads ==
- (Hong Kong) Lucky Mile

Lucky Mile is the B or second team of the HKFC Soccer Section and has used the club's membership since the late 1990s. The club now competes in the Hong Kong First Division.

- (Hong Kong) Club Wanderers
- (Hong Kong) Club Albion
- (Hong Kong) Club Colts

== Sponsors ==
Kit Supplier	Main Sponsor	Youth Section Sponsor	Soccer Sevens Sponsor
(Germany) Puma	(Hong Kong) The Executive Center	(Hong Kong) HSBC	(Hong Kong) Citibank

== Season-to-season record ==
Season	Tier	Division	Teams	Position	Home stadium	Attendance/G	FA Cup	Senior Shield	League Cup	Sapling Cup
2004–05	2	Second Division	12	1	Hong Kong Football Club Stadium		Did not enter	Did not enter	Did not enter	Not held
2005–06	2	Second Division	13	1	Hong Kong Football Club Stadium		Did not enter	Did not enter	Did not enter	Not held
2006–07	1	First Division	10	9	Hong Kong Football Club Stadium	346	Quarter-finals	Quarter-finals	Group stage	Not held
2007–08	2	Second Division	10	2	Hong Kong Football Club Stadium		Did not enter	Did not enter	Did not enter	Not held
2008–09	2	Second Division	10	3	Hong Kong Football Club Stadium		Did not enter	Did not enter	Did not enter	Not held
2009–10	2	Second Division	9	1	Hong Kong Football Club Stadium		Did not enter	Did not enter	Not held	Not held
2010–11	1	First Division	10	10	Hong Kong Football Club Stadium	327	First round	Semi-finals	First round	Not held
2011–12	2	Second Division	12	3	Hong Kong Football Club Stadium		Did not enter	Did not enter	Did not enter	Not held
2012–13	2	Second Division	11	5	Hong Kong Football Club Stadium		Did not enter	Did not enter	Not held	Not held
2013–14	2	Second Division	12	3	Hong Kong Football Club Stadium		round of 16	Did not enter	Not held	Not held
2014–15	2	First Division	15	2	Hong Kong Football Club Stadium		Did not enter	Did not enter	Did not enter	Not held
2015–16	2	First Division	14	2	Hong Kong Football Club Stadium		Did not enter	Did not enter	Did not enter	Did not enter
2016–17	1	Premier League	11	11	Hong Kong Football Club Stadium	387	First round	Quarter-finals	Defunct	First round
2017–18	2	First Division	16	1	Hong Kong Football Club Stadium		Did not enter	Did not enter	Defunct	Did not enter
2018–19	2	First Division	14	2	Hong Kong Football Club Stadium		Did not enter	Did not enter	Defunct	Did not enter
2019–20	2	First Division	14	Cancelled	Hong Kong Football Club Stadium		Did not enter	Did not enter	Defunct	Did not enter
2020–21	2	First Division	14	1	Hong Kong Football Club Stadium		Cancelled due to COVID-19 pandemic		Defunct	Did not enter
2021–22	1	Premier League	8	Cancelled	Hong Kong Football Club Stadium	489	Cancelled due to COVID-19 pandemic		Defunct	Cancelled due to COVID-19 pandemic
2022–23	1	Premier League	10	6	Hong Kong Football Club Stadium	825	Quarter-finals	First round	Defunct	Group stage
2023–24	1	Premier League	11	7	Hong Kong Football Club Stadium	462	Quarter-finals	First round	Defunct	Group stage
2024–25	1	Premier League	9	9	Hong Kong Football Club Stadium	619	Semi-finals	Quarter-finals	Defunct	Group stage
2025–26	1	Premier League	10	10	Hong Kong Football Club Stadium	672	Quarter-finals	Quarter-finals	Quarter-finals	Defunct
2026–27	1	Premier League	11		Hong Kong Football Club Stadium			First round		Defunct

Note:

1st or Champions 2nd or Runners-up 3rd place Promotion Relegation

== Honours ==
=== League ===
- Hong Kong First Division / Hong Kong Premier League (Tier 1)
  - Champions (1): 1919–20
- Hong Kong Second Division / Hong Kong First Division (Tier 2)
  - Champions (15): 1972–73, 1976–77, 1978–79, 1985–86, 1987–88, 1992–93, 1994–95, 1997–98, 1998–99, 2000–01, 2004–05, 2005–06, 2008–09, 2017–18, 2020–21
- Hong Kong Third Division / Hong Kong Second Division (Tier 3)
  - Champions (2): 1978–79, 1986–87

=== Cup Competitions ===
- Hong Kong Senior Shield
  - Champions (5): 1898–99, 1907–08, 1915–16, 1918–19, 1921–22
- Hong Kong Junior Shield
  - Champions (6): 1976–77, 1978–79, 1992–93, 1994–95, 1996–97, 2004–05

== Head coaches ==
- (England) Tony Sealy (1995–2016)
- (England) Richard Ewart (2016–2018)
- (England) Tony Hamilton-Bram (2018–2024)
- (South Africa) Chancy Cooke (2024–2026)
- (England) Darren Arnott (2026–present)

== See also ==
- Club of Pioneers
- Lucky Mile
