= Charlie Weston =

English footballer (born 2004)

Personal information
- Full name: Charlie Daniel Weston
- Date of birth: 13 July 2004 (age 22)
- Position: Midfielder

Team information
- Current team: HKFC
- Number: 8

Youth career
- Everton
- 2015–2024: Blackburn Rovers

Senior career*
Years	Team	Apps	(Gls)
2024	Blackburn Rovers	0	(0)
2024	→ Kidderminster Harriers	6	(1)
2024	Barrow	1	(0)
2024–2025	Rochdale	8	(0)
2025–2026	Curzon Ashton	46	(3)
2026–	HKFC	6	(1)

International career
2019	England U16	5	(0)
- * Club domestic league appearances and goals as of 8 November 2026

Charlie Daniel Weston (born 13 July 2004) is an English professional footballer who currently plays as a midfielder for Hong Kong Premier League club HKFC.

== Club career ==
Weston joined the Blackburn Rovers academy at under-14 level, signing a two-year scholarship deal in July 2020. In June 2022, he signed a first professional two-year contract. Having impressed for the under-23s in the first year of his contract, he found himself included in the first-team's squad for the pre-season tour to Austria.

In March 2024, Weston joined National League side Kidderminster Harriers on loan for the remainder of the season. On the final day of the season, he scored a first senior career goal as already relegated Harriers were thrashed 4–1 by Barnet. In May 2024, it was confirmed that Weston would depart Blackburn Rovers upon the expiration of his contract.

On 2 September 2024, Weston signed for League Two club Barrow, joining the side's reserve team on a short-term contract until 2 January 2025.

On 3 December 2024, Weston joined National League side Rochdale on a permanent deal until the end of the season.

In July 2025, Weston joined National League North side Curzon Ashton.

On 21 August 2026, Weston joined Hong Kong Premier League club HKFC.

== International career ==
In August 2019, Weston captained the England U15 squad at the Delle Nazioni Tournament.

== Career statistics ==
As of 25 April 2026

Appearances and goals by club, season and competition
Club	Season	League			FA Cup		League Cup		Other		Total	
Club	Season	Division	Apps	Goals	Apps	Goals	Apps	Goals	Apps	Goals	Apps	Goals
Blackburn Rovers	2023–24	Championship	0	0	0	0	0	0	—		0	0
Kidderminster Harriers (loan)	2023–24	National League	6	1	—		—		0	0	6	1
Barrow	2024–25	League Two	1	0	0	0	0	0	3 (Note: Appearance(s) in EFL Trophy)	0	4	0
Rochdale	2024–25	National League	8	0	0	0	—		7 (Note: Three appearances and one goal in National League Cup, four appearances in FA Trophy)	1	15	1
Curzon Ashton	2025–26	National League North	46	3	2	0	—		2 (Note: Appearance(s) in FA Trophy)	0	50	3
Career total			61	4	2	0	0	0	12	1	75	5
