= Goldbert Chi Chiu =

Hong Kong footballer

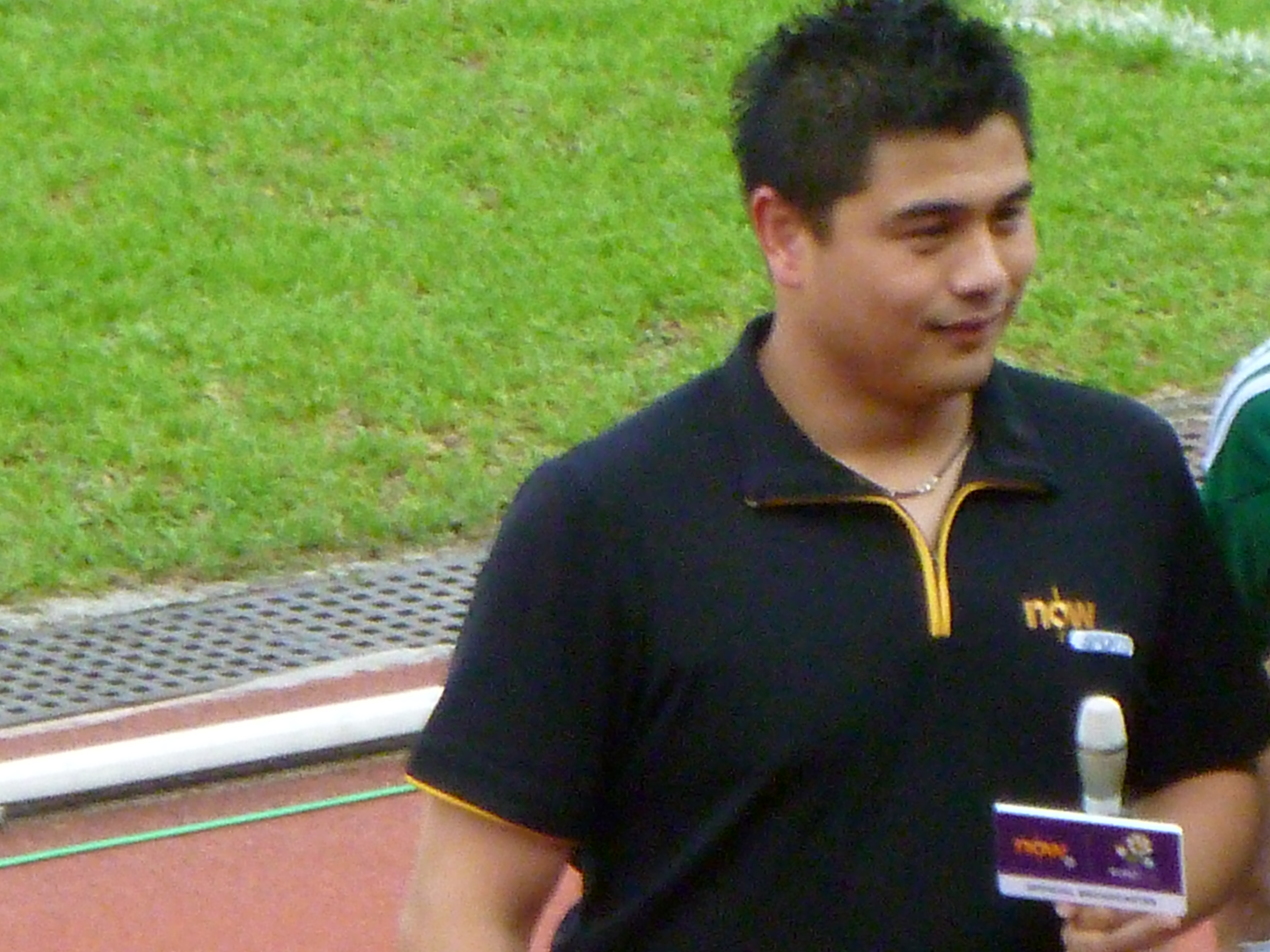

Personal information
- Full name: Goldbert Chi Chiu
- Date of birth: 1 August 1981 (age 45)
- Place of birth: Hong Kong
- Height: 1.77 m (5 ft 10 in)
- Position: Goalkeeper

Senior career*
Years	Team	Apps	(Gls)
1999–2001	Instant-Dict	0	(0)
1999–2000	→ Kitchee (loan)	0	(0)
2000–2001	→ Hong Kong Rangers (loan)		
2001–2004	Hong Kong Rangers	21	(0)
2004–2009	Kitchee	3	(0)
2009–2010	Eastern District		

International career
2003–2005	Hong Kong	4	(0)

Managerial career
- 2016–2019: Eastern District
- 2025: Eastern District
- 2025–: Eastern District (director)
- * Club domestic league appearances and goals

Goldbert Chi Chiu (Chinese: 高志超; born 1 August 1981) is a Hong Kong football manager and former professional player who played as a goalkeeper.

== Career statistics ==
=== International ===
Appearances and goals by national team and year
National team	Year	Apps	Goals
Hong Kong	2003	3	0
Hong Kong	2004	0	0
Hong Kong	2005	1	0
Total		4	0
