= Eastern District SA =

Eastern District
- Full name: Eastern District Sports Association
- Short name: EDFC
- Founded: 2002; 24 years ago
- Stadium: Siu Sai Wan Sports Ground
- Capacity: 11,981
- Head coach: Ng Wai Chiu
- League: Hong Kong Premier League
- 2025–26: Hong Kong Premier League, 8th of 10
Home colours	Away colours	Third colours

Eastern District Sports Association (Chinese: 東區體育會), also known as Eastern District Football Club (Chinese: 東區足球隊) or just Eastern District, is a Hong Kong professional football club which currently competes in the Hong Kong Premier League, the top tier of Hong Kong football.

The team play their home matches at Siu Sai Wan Sports Ground.

== History ==
In the 2002–03 season, the Hong Kong Football Association reformed the Hong Kong Second Division League and the Hong Kong Third Division League. The association suggested that different district councils form a football team based in their districts. The Eastern District Council therefore formed a football team, while the team started competing in the Hong Kong Third District Division.

In the 2008–09 season, Eastern District placed 13th out of 15 teams in the Hong Kong Third District Division. It had only won 4 matches and lost 10 matches in the league.

In the 2009–10 season, Eastern District appointed ex-Hong Kong national football team goalkeeper Goldbert Chi Chiu as their goalkeeper trainer. Despite that, their league result was worse than the previous season. It placed 13th out of 14 teams, having only won 1 match, drawn 1 match, and lost 11 matches.

Eastern District was promoted into the First Division after finishing 2nd in the 2015–16 Hong Kong Second Division.

On 4 July 2025, it was announced that Eastern District had been accepted into the Hong Kong Premier League for the 2025–26 season.

== Team staff ==
Position	Staff
Sporting director	(Hong Kong) Chu Chi Kwong
Head coach	(Hong Kong) Ng Wai Chiu
Assistant coaches	(Hong Kong) Chau Sau Him
Assistant coaches	(Hong Kong) Hélio
Assistant coaches	(Hong Kong) Tsang Tsz Hin
Fitness coach	(Hong Kong) Ng Wing Chung

== Current squad ==
=== First team ===
As of 6 November 2026

Note: Flags indicate national team as defined under FIFA eligibility rules; some limited exceptions apply. Players may hold more than one non-FIFA nationality.

No.	Pos.	Nation	Player
2	DF	BRA	Lucas Kawan
3	DF	HKG	Sung Wang Ngai
4	DF	BRA	Bruno Bianconi
5	DF	HKG	Hélio (captain)
6	DF	ESP	Daniel Almazan
7	FW	BRA	Michel Renner
8	MF	ENG	Charlie Scott
10	FW	ESP	Álvaro Salinas
11	FW	BRA	Luizinho
13	DF	HKG	Li Ngai Hoi
14	FW	CHN	Pan Zeng
15	MF	BRA	Bruno Luiz
16	MF	HKG	Kwok Tsz Kaai
17	FW	HKG	Léo
18	MF	HKG	Marco Pirie
19	FW	CGO	Tiekoro Sissoko
20	MF	HKG	Marcus McMillan

No.	Pos.	Nation	Player
21	MF	HKG	Leung Yik Lai
22	MF	HKG	Yuen Chun Him (on loan from Kitchee)
23	GK	HKG	Paulo César
26	MF	HKG	Chan Yiu Cho
27	MF	HKG	Yeung Cheuk Kwan
31	GK	HKG	Li Yat Chun
32	DF	HKG	Krisna Korani
35	DF	KOR	Na Yun-ho
43	FW	HKG	Chan Yuk Pui
44	MF	HKG	Wong Ching Tak
54	DF	HKG	Chan Yin Hei
62	FW	HKG	Pang Hing Hei
72	MF	HKG	Yoong Ka Hei
77	FW	CHN	Pan Zeng
80	DF	HKG	Pang Lam Wai
97	GK	ENG	Dipen Gurung

== Season-to-season record ==
Season	Tier	Division	Teams	Position	Home stadium	Attendance/G	FA Cup	Senior Shield	League Cup
2002–03	3	Third District Division	13				Did not enter		
2003–04	3	Third District Division					Did not enter		
2004–05	3	Third District Division					Did not enter		
2005–06	3	Third District Division	16	5			Did not enter		
2006–07	3	Third District Division	17	13			Did not enter		
2007–08	3	Third District Division	16	16			Did not enter		
2008–09	3	Third District Division	15	13			Did not enter		
2009–10	3	Third District Division	14	13			Did not enter		
2010–11	3	Third District Division	11	7			Did not enter		
2011–12	3	Third District Division	8	2			Did not enter		
2012–13	3	Third Division	14	9			Did not enter		
2013–14	3	Third Division	14	5			Did not enter		
2014–15	3	Second Division	12	5			Did not enter		
2015–16	3	Second Division	12	2			Did not enter		
2016–17	2	First Division	14	8			Did not enter		
2017–18	2	First Division	16	3			Did not enter		
2018–19	2	First Division	14	5			Did not enter		
2019–20	2	First Division	14	Cancelled			Did not enter		
2020–21	2	First Division	14	11			Did not enter		
2021–22	2	First Division	14	Cancelled			Did not enter		
2022–23	2	First Division	14	9			Did not enter		
2023–24	2	First Division	12	9			Did not enter		
2024–25	2	First Division	13	8			Did not enter		
2025–26	1	Premier League	10	8	Siu Sai Wan Sports Ground	1,040	Runners-up	First round	Quarter-finals
2026–27	1	Premier League	11		Siu Sai Wan Sports Ground			First round	

Note: 1st or Champions 2nd or Runners-up 3rd place Promotion Relegation

== Head coaches ==
- (Hong Kong) Tam Siu Wai (2010–2016)
- (Hong Kong) Goldbert Chi Chiu (2016–2019)
- (Hong Kong) Lo Chi Hin (2019–2024)
- (Spain) Àlex Roca (2024–2025)
- (Hong Kong) Goldbert Chi Chiu (2025)
- (Spain) Raúl Coloma (2025)
- (Hong Kong) Ng Wai Chiu (2025–present)
