= 2018–19 Hong Kong First Division League =

Hong Kong First Division
- Season: 2018–19
- Champions: Happy Valley
- Promoted: Happy Valley; Rangers
- Relegated: Double Flower; Mutual
- Matches played: 182
- Goals scored: 673 (3.7 per match)
- Top goalscorer: Ndue Mujeci (Happy Valley) (29 goals)
- Biggest home win: Happy Valley 9–0 Mutual (17 February 2019)
- Biggest away win: Metro Gallery 0–10 Happy Valley (10 February 2019)
- Highest scoring: Metro Gallery 0–10 Happy Valley (10 February 2019)
- Longest winning run: Happy Valley (13 matches)
- Longest unbeaten run: Happy Valley (18 matches)
- Longest winless run: Mutual (22 matches)
- Longest losing run: Mutual (14 matches)

The 2018–19 Hong Kong First Division League was the 5th season of Hong Kong First Division since it became the second-tier football league in Hong Kong in 2014–15. The season began on 9 September 2018 and ended on 12 May 2019.

== Teams ==
=== Changes from last season ===
==== From First Division ====
===== Promoted to the Premier League =====
- Hoi King

===== Relegated to the Second Division =====
- Sun Hei
- Tung Sing
- Kwun Tong
- Wan Chai

==== To First Division ====
===== Relegated from the Premier League =====
- Rangers

===== Promoted from the Second Division =====
- Happy Valley
- Central & Western

== League table ==
Pos	Team	Pld	W	D	L	GF	GA	GD	Pts	Promotion or relegation
1	Happy Valley (C, P)	26	22	2	2	98	14	+84	68	Promotion to Premier League
2	HKFC	26	19	4	3	85	19	+66	61	
3	Rangers (P)	26	14	9	3	56	15	+41	51	Promotion to Premier League (Note: Since Dreams FC decided to self-relegate due to lack of funds, Rangers were granted promotion.)
4	Wing Yee	26	15	5	6	52	28	+24	50	
5	Eastern District	26	12	2	12	53	46	+7	38	
6	Sha Tin	26	10	3	13	47	50	−3	33	
7	Resources Capital	26	9	5	12	41	41	0	32	
8	South China	26	8	8	10	40	51	−11	32	
9	Central & Western	26	7	10	9	40	45	−5	31	
10	Citizen	26	8	6	12	38	53	−15	30	
11	Wong Tai Sin	26	8	4	14	32	68	−36	28	
12	Metro Gallery	26	6	6	14	39	76	−37	24	
13	Double Flower (R)	26	6	4	16	32	86	−54	22	Relegation to Second Division
14	Mutual (R)	26	2	4	20	20	81	−61	10	Relegation to Second Division

Updated to match(es) played on 12 May 2019. Source: Hong Kong Football Association
Rules for classification: 1) Points; 2) Head-to-head points; 3) Head-to-head goal difference; 4) Head-to-head goals scored; 5) Goal difference; 6) Goals scored; 7) Fair-play points; 8) Drawing lots
(C) Champions; (P) Promoted; (R) Relegated
