= 2020–21 Hong Kong First Division League =

Hong Kong First Division
- Season: 2020–21
- Champions: HKFC
- Promoted: HKFC
- Relegated: None
- Matches: 91
- Goals: 362 (3.98 per match)
- Top goalscorer: Lo Kong Wai (Sham Shui Po); Thiago Silva (North District) (11 goals)
- Biggest home win: Central & Western 9–0 Hoi King (22 November 2020)
- Biggest away win: Central & Western 0–9 HKFC (6 June 2021)
- Highest scoring: Hoi King 8–3 Metro Gallery (20 June 2021)
- Longest winning run: HKFC (13 matches)
- Longest unbeaten run: HKFC (13 matches)
- Longest winless run: Tai Po; Wong Tai Sin (6 matches)
- Longest losing run: Tai Po (6 matches)

The 2020–21 Hong Kong First Division League was the 7th season of Hong Kong First Division since it became the second-tier football league in Hong Kong in 2014–15. The season began on 22 November 2020 and ended on 20 June 2021.

== Format ==
Relegation was suspended during the 2020–21 season and the season was shortened to a single round-robin due to the COVID-19 pandemic in Hong Kong.

== Teams ==
=== Changes from last season ===
==== From First Division ====
===== Promoted to the Premier League =====
- Resources Capital

==== Withdrawn from the First Division ====
- King Fung

== League table ==
Pos	Team	Pld	W	D	L	GF	GA	GD	Pts	Promotion or relegation
1	HKFC (C, P)	13	13	0	0	47	4	+43	39	Promotion to the Premier League
2	North District	13	10	2	1	31	13	+18	32	
3	Sham Shui Po	13	7	3	3	33	17	+16	24 (Note: Sham Shui Po wins head-to-head against South China)	
4	South China	13	7	3	3	31	15	+16	24	
5	Sha Tin	13	6	2	5	24	19	+5	20	
6	Wing Yee	13	5	3	5	22	27	−5	18	
7	Yuen Long	13	4	5	4	26	29	−3	17	
8	Citizen	13	5	1	7	24	27	−3	16 (Note: Citizen wins head-to-head against Central & Western)	
9	Central & Western	13	5	1	7	23	28	−5	16	
10	Hoi King	13	4	3	6	23	32	−9	15	
11	Eastern District	13	3	4	6	19	20	−1	13	
12	Metro Gallery	13	2	2	9	19	52	−33	8	
13	Tai Po	13	2	2	9	20	32	−12	8	
14	Wong Tai Sin	13	2	1	10	20	47	−27	7	

Updated to match(es) played on 20 June 2021. Source: Hong Kong Football Association
Rules for classification: 1) Points; 2) Head-to-head points; 3) Head-to-head goal difference; 4) Head-to-head goals scored; 5) Goal difference; 6) Goals scored; 7) Fair-play points; 8) Drawing lots
(C) Champions; (P) Promoted
