= 2021–22 Hong Kong Premier League =

Hong Kong Premier League
- Season: 2021–22
- Dates: 23 October 2021 – 12 December 2021 (season cancelled)
- Champions: None
- Relegated: None
- Matches: 15
- Goals: 65 (4.33 per match)
- Biggest home win: Kitchee 6–0 HK U23 (30 October 2021)
- Biggest away win: Resources Capital 0–4 Southern (31 October 2021)
- Highest scoring: Resources Capital 3–5 Rangers (24 October 2021)
- Longest winning run: 4 matches Southern
- Longest unbeaten run: 4 matches Southern; Kitchee
- Longest winless run: 4 matches HKFC; HK U23
- Longest losing run: 3 matches Resources Capital
- Highest attendance: 3,163; Kitchee 1–0 Eastern (23 October 2021)
- Lowest attendance: 260; HK U23 2–2 HKFC (21 November 2021)
- Total attendance: 13,498
- Average attendance: 900
- All statistics correct as of 12 December 2021.

The 2021–22 Hong Kong Premier League (also known as the BOC Life Hong Kong Premier League for sponsorship reasons) was an abandoned season of the Hong Kong Premier League, the top division of Hong Kong football.

== Effects of the COVID-19 pandemic ==
On 5 January 2022, the Hong Kong government announced a tightening of social distancing measures between 7 January to 20 January in order to control the Omicron outbreak. Public recreation facilities, such as football pitches, were closed and members of the public were barred from gathering in groups of more than two, making it impossible for the season to continue. The Hong Kong Football Association announced on the same day that it would also postpone any scheduled matches in the successive two week period.

After the measures were extended several times in the following weeks, the government announced on 22 February that it would extend the measures until 20 April, making it nearly impossible to complete the season before most player contracts expired on 31 May. The HKFA held an emergency meeting with the clubs on 25 February, after which it was determined that the remainder of the season would be cancelled.

== Teams ==
A total of 8 teams contest the league, including six teams from the 2020–21 Hong Kong Premier League, one team promoted from the 2020–21 Hong Kong First Division and one newly established team. Pegasus and Happy Valley decided to self-relegate to amateur leagues due to lack of funds.

Club	Founded	Position Last Season
Kitchee	1931	1st
Eastern	1932	2nd
Lee Man	2017	3rd
Southern	2002	5th
Rangers	1958	6th
Resources Capital	1982	7th
HKFC	1886	1st in First Division
HK U23	2021	N/A

- Pink denotes a newly promoted/established club entering the league this year.

=== Stadia and locations ===
Locations of the Hong Kong based teams.

Primary venues used in the Hong Kong Premier League:

Kitchee Eastern	Rangers	Lee Man
Mong Kok Stadium	Sham Shui Po Sports Ground	Tseung Kwan O Sports Ground
Capacity: 6,664	Capacity: 2,194	Capacity: 3,500
HK U23 Resources Capital	HKFC	Southern
Tsing Yi Sports Ground	HKFC Stadium	Aberdeen Sports Ground
Capacity: 1,500	Capacity: 2,750	Capacity: 4,000

=== Personnel and kits ===
Team	Chairman	Head coach	Captain	Kit manufacturer	Main sponsor
Eastern	Lam Kin Ming	(Hong Kong) Roberto Losada	(Hong Kong) Leung Chun Pong	Adidas	Upbest Group
Kitchee	Ken Ng	(Hong Kong) Chu Chi Kwong	(Hong Kong) Huang Yang	Nike	EDPS Systems Ltd.
Lee Man	Norman Lee	(Hong Kong) Chan Hiu Ming	(Hong Kong) Fernando Recio	Adidas	Lee & Man Chemical
Rangers	Peter Mok	(Hong Kong) Chiu Chung Man (Hong Kong) Wong Chin Hung (Hong Kong) Lai Ka Fai	(Hong Kong) Lam Ka Wai	Ucan	Biu Chun Watch Hands & Parts Manufacturers Ltd.
Southern	Matthew Wong	(Pakistan) Zesh Rehman	(Japan) Shu Sasaki	Macron	Isuzu
Resources Capital	Hanson Wong	(Spain) Joan Esteva	(Hong Kong) Cheng King Ho		Future Hong Kong Football Development Charity Limited
HKFC	Tony Sealy	(Hong Kong) Tony Hamilton-Bram	(Netherlands) Freek Schipper	Adidas	The Executive Centre
HK U23	Eric Fok	(Hong Kong) Cheung Kin Fung	(Hong Kong) Wong Wai	Lotto	Key Connect

=== Managerial changes ===
Team	Outgoing manager	Manner of departure	Date of vacancy	Position in table	Incoming manager	Date of appointment
Kitchee	(Hong Kong) Chu Chi Kwong	Change of Role	2 August 2021	Pre-season	(South Korea) Kim Dong-jin	2 August 2021
Kitchee	(South Korea) Kim Dong-jin	Change of Role	3 March 2022	2nd	(Hong Kong) Chu Chi Kwong	3 March 2022

=== Foreign players ===
The number of foreign players is restricted to six per team, with no more than five on the pitch during matches, the fifth player must be a marquee player.

According to the decision made by Hong Kong Football Association Board of Directors on 15 July 2020, the marquee player must fulfil one of the following criteria:

i) played for a club which is in a world's top professional league of one of the top 50 associations in the FIFA ranking published by FIFA on 11 June 2020 for at least 1 season or ii) fielded by his association in an international match, which his association is one of the top 50 associations in the FIFA ranking published by FIFA on 11 June 2020.

Marquee Player

Club	Player 1	Player 2	Player 3	Player 4	Player 5	Player 6	Former/Unregistered Players
Eastern	(Spain) Marcos Gondra	(Brazil) Mikael	(Kyrgyzstan) Tamirlan Kozubayev	(Spain) Víctor Bertomeu			(Brazil) Everton (Brazil) Eduardo Praes (Spain) Toni Dovale
Kitchee	(Montenegro) Dejan Damjanović	(South Korea) Park Jun-heong	(Spain) Raúl Baena	(Spain) Manuel Gavilán	(Brazil) Cleiton	(England) Charlie Scott	(Turkmenistan) Ruslan Mingazow
Lee Man	(Argentina) Jonathan Acosta	(Brazil) Junior Dutra	(Brazil) Gil	(South Korea) Kim Seung-yong	(Spain) José Ángel	(Spain) Manolo Bleda	
Southern	(Brazil) Stefan Pereira	(Pakistan) Zesh Rehman	(Brazil) Dudu	(Brazil) Luciano	(Japan) Kota Kawase	(Japan) Shu Sasaki	
Rangers	(Argentina) Leandro Bazán	(Ukraine) Oleksii Shliakotin	(Brazil) Juninho	(Japan) Ryota Hayashi	(South Korea) Kim Min-kyu		
Resources Capital	(Spain) Albert Canal	(Brazil) Felipe Sá	(England) Jordon Brown	(Spain) Joan Esteva	(Spain) Carles Tena|	(Spain) Diego Peláez	

There are no restrictions on the number of foreign players HKFC can register. However, the team must have at least nine Hong Kong players in the squad, with no less than three on the pitch during matches.

Club	HK Player 1	HK Player 2	HK Player 3	HK Player 4	HK Player 5	HK Player 6	HK Player 7	HK Player 8	HK Player 9
HKFC	(Australia) Stephen Liu	(England) Robert Bacon	(England) Matthew Hoare	(Hong Kong) Ghislain Bell Bell	(Hong Kong) Chan Wai Hin	(Hong Kong) Tristan Cheung	(Hong Kong) Christopher Chung	(Hong Kong) Noa Fjelddahl	(Hong Kong) Brian Fok
HKFC	HK Player 10	HK Player 11	HK Player 12	HK Player 13	HK Player 14	HK Player 15	HK Player 16	HK Player 17	HK Player 18
HKFC	(Hong Kong) Oliver Laxton	(Hong Kong) Liu Sui Man	(Hong Kong) Poon Ka Ming	(Hong Kong) Hardikpreet Singh	(Hong Kong) To Chun Kiu	(Hong Kong) Lucas Yan	(Hong Kong) Yue Yixing	(Netherlands) Freek Schipper	(Scotland) Robert Scott

HK U23 is not allowed to register any foreign players. Meanwhile, the number of overaged players is restricted to five for the team, with no more than three on the pitch during matches. The rest of the players must meet the registration status of U23 local players.

Club	Overaged Player 1	Overaged Player 2	Overaged Player 3	Overaged Player 4	Overaged Player 5
HK U23	(Hong Kong) Chan Ching Him	(Hong Kong) Kwok Tsz Kaai	(Hong Kong) Law Hiu Chung	(Hong Kong) Wong Ho Yin	(Hong Kong) Wong Wai

== League table ==
Pos	Team	Pld	W	D	L	GF	GA	GD	Pts	Qualification or relegation (Note: Teams are split into two groups (Championship Group and Challenge Group) after each have played 14 matches.)
1	Southern	4	4	0	0	12	1	+11	12	Qualified to Championship Group
2	Kitchee	4	3	1	0	15	3	+12	10	Qualified to Championship Group
3	Lee Man	3	2	1	0	9	2	+7	7	Qualified to Championship Group
4	Eastern	4	2	0	2	8	4	+4	6	Qualified to Championship Group
5	Rangers	4	2	0	2	11	15	−4	6	Qualified to Challenge Group
6	HKFC	4	0	1	3	4	11	−7	1	Qualified to Challenge Group
7	HK U23	4	0	1	3	3	16	−13	1	Qualified to Challenge Group
8	Resources Capital	3	0	0	3	3	13	−10	0	Qualified to Challenge Group

Updated to match(es) played on 12 December 2021. Source: Hong Kong Football Association
Rules for classification: 1) Points; 2) Head-to-head points; 3) Head-to-head goal difference; 4) Head-to-head goals scored; 5) Goal difference; 6) Goals scored; 7) Fair-play points; 8) Drawing lots (Play-off if the winner has to be decided).

== Results ==
Home \ Away	KIT	EAS	LEE	SOU	RAN	RES	HKF	U23
Kitchee	—	1–0	16 Mar	23 Jan	5 Mar	6 Apr	2 Mar	6–0
Eastern	26 Feb	—	2 Apr	0–1	4–2	4–0	5 Feb	19 Mar
Lee Man	2–2	15 Jan	—	6 Feb	20 Mar	20 Feb	23 Apr	4–0
Southern	20 Mar	5 Mar	12 Mar	—	15 Jan	23 Apr	3–0	4–1
Rangers	1–6	24 Apr	23 Jan	5 Apr	—	27 Feb	10 Apr	6 Feb
Resources Capital	5 Feb	16 Apr	6 Mar	0–4	3–5	—	19 Mar	3 Apr
HKFC	16 Jan	13 Mar	0–3	25 Feb	1 May	23 Jan	—	6 Mar
HK U23	20 Feb	23 Jan	27 Feb	17 Apr	2–3	16 Jan	2–2	—

Updated to match(es) played on 12 December 2021. Source: HKFA
Legend: Blue = home team win; Yellow = draw; Red = away team win.

== Positions by round ==
To preserve chronological evolvements, any postponed matches are not included to the round at which they were originally scheduled, but added to the full round they were played immediately afterwards. For example, if a match is scheduled for round 7, but then played between rounds 8 and 9, it will be added to the standings for round 8.

Team ╲ Round	1	2	3	4
Kitchee	3	2	3	2
Eastern	6	3	2	4
Lee Man	4	5	5	3
Southern	1	1	1	1
Rangers	2	4	4	5
Resources Capital	7	7	8	8
HKFC	8	6	6	6
HK U23	4	8	7	7

Qualification for the Championship Group
Qualification for the Challenge Group

Updated to match(es) played on 12 Dec 2021. Source: Hong Kong Football Association website

== Fixtures and results ==
=== Round 1 ===
23 October 2021	Kitchee	1–0	Eastern	Mong Kok, Kowloon
15:30 (UTC+8)	Gavilán 14'	Report		Stadium: Mong Kok Stadium; Attendance: 3,163; Referee: Ho Wai Sing

24 October 2021	Southern	3–0	HKFC	Aberdeen, Hong Kong
15:30 (UTC+8)	Pereira 16', 21', 31'	Report		Stadium: Aberdeen Sports Ground; Attendance: 451; Referee: Tang Hing Fu

24 October 2021	Resources Capital	3–5	Rangers	Tsing Yi, New Territories
18:00 (UTC+8)	Lau Kwan Ching 5'; Ho Sze Chit 49'; Wong Wai Kwok 50'	Report	Lo Kwan Yee 54' (pen.); Juninho 61'; Kim Min-kyu 63'; Bazán 69', 73'	Stadium: Tsing Yi Sports Ground; Attendance: 424; Referee: Tam Ping Wun

5 December 2021	Lee Man	4–0	HK U23	Tseung Kwan O, New Territories
17:30 (UTC+8)	Ángel 6'; Chang Hei Yin 40'; Dutra 60', 90+3'	Report		Stadium: Tseung Kwan O Sports Ground; Attendance: 382; Referee: Ho Wai Sing

=== Round 2 ===
30 October 2021	Kitchee	6–0	HK U23	Mong Kok, Kowloon
15:30 (UTC+8)	Baena 2'; Chan Siu Kwan 9'; Damjanović 12', 76', 86'; Orr 36'	Report		Stadium: Mong Kok Stadium; Attendance: 1,192; Referee: Law Bik Chi

31 October 2021	Resources Capital	0–4	Southern	Tsing Yi, New Territories
15:30 (UTC+8)		Report	Canal 21' (o.g.); Ju Yingzhi 29'; Ha 35'; Luciano 81'	Stadium: Tsing Yi Sports Ground; Attendance: 514; Referee: Poon Chun Kit

31 October 2021	Eastern	4–2	Rangers	Mong Kok, Kowloon
18:00 (UTC+8)	Marcos 34'; Fung Hing Wa 40'; Everton 47'; Mikael 87'	Report	Bazán 38'; Juninho 86'	Stadium: Mong Kok Stadium; Attendance: 925; Referee: Luk Kin Sun

12 December 2021	HKFC	0–3	Lee Man	Happy Valley, Hong Kong Island
19:30 (UTC+8)		Report	Chang Hei Yin 6', 61'; Thomas Harrington 56' (o.g.)	Stadium: Hong Kong Football Club Stadium; Attendance: 537; Referee: Luk Kin Sun

=== Round 3 ===
6 November 2021	Southern	4–1	HK U23	Aberdeen, Hong Kong
15:00 (UTC+8)	Pereira 5', 15', 61'; Sasaki 50'	Report	Wong Wai 45+1'	Stadium: Aberdeen Sports Ground; Attendance: 396; Referee: Woo Chun Sing

7 November 2021	Eastern	4–0	Resources Capital	Mong Kok, Kowloon
15:00 (UTC+8)	Fernando 7'; Sun Ming Him 42'; Bertomeu 78', 88'	Report		Stadium: Mong Kok Stadium; Attendance: 908; Referee: Liu Kwok Man

7 November 2021	HKFC	2–3	Rangers	Happy Valley, Hong Kong Island
19:30 (UTC+8)	Sahaghian 74'; Lau Hok Ming 90+2' (o.g.)	Report	Bazán 3', 58', 68'	Stadium: Hong Kong Football Club Stadium; Attendance: 441; Referee: Wong Wai Lun

21 November 2021	Lee Man	2–2	Kitchee	Tseung Kwan O, New Territories
17:30 (UTC+8)	Kim Seung-yong 45'; Bleda 79'	Report	Damjanović 6'; Baena 20'	Stadium: Tseung Kwan O Sports Ground; Attendance: 1,504; Referee: Ho Wai Sing

=== Round 4 ===
20 November 2021	Eastern	0–1	Southern	Mong Kok, Kowloon
17:30 (UTC+8)		Report	Pereira 84'	Stadium: Mong Kok Stadium; Attendance: 1,325; Referee: Lau Fong Hei

21 November 2021	HK U23	2–2	HKFC	Tsing Yi, New Territories
15:00 (UTC+8)	Wong Wai 22'; Yuen Sai Kit 76'	Report	Léo 40'; Schipper 45+2'	Stadium: Tsing Yi Sports Ground; Attendance: 260; Referee: Tam Ping Wun

5 December 2021	Rangers	1–6	Kitchee	Sham Shui Po, Kowloon
15:00 (UTC+8)	Bazán 45+1'	Report	Tomas 2', 30'; Chan Siu Kwan 62'; Ichikawa 63'; Cleiton 82'; Roberto 90+4'	Stadium: Sham Shui Po Sports Ground; Attendance: 1076; Referee: Liu Kwok Man

20 February 2022	Lee Man	Cancelled	Resources Capital	Tseung Kwan O, New Territories
15:00 (UTC+8)		Report		Stadium: Tseung Kwan O Sports Ground

== Season statistics ==
=== Top scorers ===
As of matches played 12 December 2021

Rank	Player	Club	Goals
1	(Brazil) Stefan Pereira	Southern	7
1	(Argentina) Leandro Bazán	Rangers	7
2	(Montenegro) Dejan Damjanović	Kitchee	4
3	(Hong Kong) Chang Hei Yin	Lee Man	3
4	(Brazil) Juninho	Rangers	2
4	(Spain) Víctor Bertomeu	Eastern	2
4	(Hong Kong) Wong Wai	HK U23	2
4	(Spain) Raúl Baena	Kitchee	2
4	(Hong Kong) Chan Siu Kwan	Kitchee	2
4	(Hong Kong) Tomas	Kitchee	2
4	(Brazil) Júnior Dutra	Lee Man	2

=== Hat-tricks ===
Note: The results column shows the scorer's team score first. Teams in bold are home teams.

#	Player	For	Against	Result	Date	Ref
1	(Brazil) Stefan Pereira	**Southern**	HKFC	3–0	25 October 2021	
2	(Montenegro) Dejan Damjanović	**Kitchee**	HK U23	6–0	30 October 2021	
3	(Brazil) Stefan Pereira	**Southern**	HK U23	4–1	6 November 2021	
4	(Argentina) Leandro Bazán	Rangers	**HKFC**	3–2	7 November 2021	

=== Clean sheets ===
Rank	Player	Club	Match(es)
1	(Hong Kong) Ng Wai Him	Southern	3
2	(Hong Kong) Paulo César	Kitchee	1
2	(Hong Kong) Wang Zhenpeng	Kitchee	1
2	(Hong Kong) Yapp Hung Fai	Eastern	1
2	(Hong Kong) Chan Ka Ho	Lee Man	1
2	(Hong Kong) Yuen Ho Chun	Lee Man	1

== Attendances ==
As of matches played 12 December 2021

Pos	Team	Total	High	Low	Average	Change
1	Kitchee	4,355	3,163	1,192	2,178	+31.8%
2	Rangers	1,076	1,076	1,076	1,076	+75.5%
3	Eastern	3,158	1,325	908	1,053	−9.4%
4	Lee Man	1,886	1,504	382	943	+10.7%
5	HKFC	978	537	441	489	n/a^{1}
6	Resources Capital	938	514	424	469	−18.4%
7	Southern	847	451	396	424	−32.4%
8	HK U23	260	260	260	260	n/a^{1}
	League total	12,580	3,163	260	973	+0.4%

Source: HKFA
Notes:
1: Team did not play in the Premier League last season
