= 2020–21 Hong Kong Premier League =

Hong Kong Premier League
- Season: 2020–21
- Dates: 14 November 2020 – 30 May 2021
- Champions: Kitchee
- AFC Champions League: Kitchee
- AFC Cup: Eastern
- Matches: 68
- Goals: 221 (3.25 per match)
- Top goalscorer: (Montenegro) Dejan Damjanović (17 goals)
- Best goalkeeper: Yapp Hung Fai (Eastern)
- Biggest home win: Eastern 5–0 Resources Capital (21 November 2020); Happy Valley 7–2 Resources Capital (22 May 2021)
- Biggest away win: Resources Capital 0–6 Rangers (16 May 2021)
- Highest scoring: Happy Valley 7–2 Resources Capital (22 May 2021)
- Longest winning run: 7 matches Kitchee
- Longest unbeaten run: 14 matches Kitchee
- Longest winless run: 8 matches Southern
- Longest losing run: 6 matches Happy Valley
- Highest attendance: 7,802; Kitchee 2–0 Eastern (23 May 2021)
- Lowest attendance: 308; Southern 4–1 Resources Capital (5 May 2021)
- Total attendance: 72,560
- Average attendance: 1,067

The 2020–21 Hong Kong Premier League (also known as the BOC Life Hong Kong Premier League for sponsorship reasons) was the 7th season of the Hong Kong Premier League, the top division of Hong Kong football.

== Effects of the 2019–20 coronavirus pandemic ==
Due to the 2020 coronavirus pandemic in Hong Kong, the Hong Kong Football Association postponed the opening of the 2020–21 season. Later, it was announced that the season would begin on 21 November 2020. The league was suspended again after two rounds being played due to the third wave of coronavirus pandemic in Hong Kong. On 12 February 2021, the Hong Kong Leisure and Cultural Services Department approved to resume football competitions in Hong Kong after February 20 behind closed doors. The Senior Shied and FA Cup were cancelled, while the ongoing Sapling Cup would continue.

== Teams ==
A total of eight teams contest the league, including seven sides from the 2019–20 Hong Kong Premier League and one promoted from the 2019–20 Hong Kong First Division. Tai Po and Yuen Long decided to self-relegate to the Hong Kong First Division due to lack of funds. Meanwhile, R&F decided to withdraw from the league system.

Club	Founded	Position Last Season
Kitchee	1931	1st
Eastern	1932	2nd
Lee Man	2017	4th
Southern	2002	5th
Happy Valley	1950	6th
Pegasus	2008	Withdrew
Rangers	1958	Withdrew
Resources Capital	1982	1st in First Division (before cancellation)

- Pink denotes a newly promoted club entering the league this year.

=== Stadia and locations ===
Locations of the Hong Kong based teams.

Primary venues used in the Hong Kong Premier League:

Kitchee Eastern	Happy Valley	Lee Man	Resources Capital
Mong Kok Stadium	Sham Shui Po Sports Ground	Tseung Kwan O Sports Ground	Tsing Yi Sports Ground
Capacity: 6,664	Capacity: 2,194	Capacity: 3,500	Capacity: 1,500
Rangers	Pegasus	Southern	
Hammer Hill Road Sports Ground	Yuen Long Stadium	Aberdeen Sports Ground	
Capacity: 2,200	Capacity: 4,932	Capacity: 4,000	

=== Personnel and kits ===
Team	Chairman	Head coach	Captain	Kit manufacturer	Main sponsor
Eastern	Lam Kin Ming	(Spain) Roberto Losada	(Hong Kong) Leung Chun Pong	Adidas	Upbest Group
Happy Valley	Chen Zhishi	(Hong Kong) Pau Ka Yiu	(Brazil) Luciano	Adidas	Michi
Kitchee	Ken Ng	(Hong Kong) Chu Chi Kwong	(Hong Kong) Huang Yang	Nike	EDPS Systems Ltd.
Pegasus	Steven Lo	(Hong Kong) Kwok Kar Lok	(Hong Kong) Leung Hing Kit	Adidas	RedMR
Lee Man	Norman Lee	(Hong Kong) Chan Hiu Ming	(Hong Kong) Fernando Recio	Adidas	Lee & Man Chemical
Rangers	Peter Mok	(Hong Kong) Chiu Chung Man (Hong Kong) Wong Chin Hung (Hong Kong) Lai Ka Fai	(Hong Kong) Lam Ka Wai	Kelme; Ucan	Hong Kong Amateur Football Association
Southern	Matthew Wong	(Pakistan) Zesh Rehman	(Japan) Shu Sasaki	Macron	Isuzu
Resources Capital	Hanson Wong	(Spain) Joan Esteva	(Hong Kong) Lam Chun Kit (Hong Kong) Law Ho Yin (Hong Kong) Liu Yik Shing (Spain) Carles Tena		Future Hong Kong Football Development Charity Limited

=== Managerial changes ===
Team	Outgoing manager	Manner of departure	Date of vacancy	Position in table	Incoming manager	Date of appointment
Pegasus	(Hong Kong) Man Pei Tak	Change of Role	20 October 2020	Pre-season	(Hong Kong) Kwok Kar Lok	20 October 2020
Eastern	(Hong Kong) Lee Chi Kin	Change of Role	28 May 2021	2nd	(Spain) Roberto Losada	28 May 2021

=== Foreign players ===
The number of foreign players is restricted to six per team, with no more than five on the pitch during matches, the fifth player must be a marquee player.

According to the decision made by Hong Kong Football Association Board of Directors on 15 July 2020, the marquee player must fulfil one of the following criteria:

i) played for a club which is in a world's top professional league of one of the top 50 associations in the FIFA ranking published by FIFA on 11 June 2020 for at least 1 season or ii) fielded by his association in an international match, which his association is one of the top 50 associations in the FIFA ranking published by FIFA on 11 June 2020.

Marquee Player

Club	Player 1	Player 2	Player 3	Player 4	Player 5	Player 6	Former/Unregistered Players
Eastern	(Brazil) Lucas Silva	(Brazil) Everton	(Brazil) Dudu	(Brazil) João Emir	(Brazil) Eduardo Praes		(Chinese Taipei) Chen Hao-wei
Happy Valley	(Nigeria) Razaq Adegbite	(Brazil) Luciano	(Brazil) Mikael	(England) Charlie Scott	(Nigeria) Robert Odu		
Kitchee	(Spain) Raúl Baena	(Spain) Manuel Gavilán	(Montenegro) Dejan Damjanović	(South Korea) Park Jun-heong	(Brazil) Cleiton	(Brazil) Tomas	(Brazil) Wellingsson
Lee Man	(Argentina) Jonathan Acosta	(Brazil) Gil	(South Korea) Kim Seung-yong	(Spain) José Ángel	(Ukraine) Serhiy Shapoval	(Spain) Manolo Bleda	(France) Michaël N'dri
Southern	(Brazil) Stefan Pereira	(Pakistan) Zesh Rehman	(Japan) Kota Kawase	(Japan) Shu Sasaki			(Australia) Matthew Cahill (Portugal) Pedro Mendes
Pegasus	(Brazil) Marquinhos	(Brazil) Nilson	(Brazil) Júnior Goiano	(Brazil) Kessi			(Brazil) Bernardo
Rangers	(Ukraine) Oleksii Shliakotin	(Brazil) Douglão	(Brazil) Juninho	(Brazil) Fernando Lopes	(Brazil) Augusto Neto		
Resources Capital	(Spain) Albert Canal	(Brazil) Felipe Sá	(England) Jordon Brown	(Spain) Carles Tena			

== League table ==
Pos	Team	Pld	W	D	L	GF	GA	GD	Pts	Qualification or relegation (Note: Teams play each other twice (14 matches), before the league is split into two groups (the top four and the bottom four).)
1	Kitchee (C)	17	11	4	2	32	12	+20	37	Qualification for AFC Champions League Group Stage
2	Eastern	17	10	4	3	38	16	+22	34	Qualification for AFC Cup Group Stage
3	Lee Man	17	9	3	5	34	21	+13	30	Qualification for AFC Cup Qualifying Play-offs
4	Pegasus (D, R)	17	9	1	7	23	27	−4	28	Relegation to Hong Kong Third Division League (Note: Pegasus announced that they would self-relegate to the third division due to lack of funds.)
5	Southern	17	4	4	9	29	35	−6	16 (Note: Head-to head points: Southern 5, Rangers 2)	
6	Rangers	17	3	7	7	25	28	−3	16	
7	Resources Capital	17	5	0	12	15	49	−34	15	
8	Happy Valley (R)	17	2	7	8	25	33	−8	13	Relegation to Hong Kong First Division League

Source: Hong Kong Football Association
Rules for classification: 1) Points; 2) Head-to-head points; 3) Head-to-head goal difference; 4) Head-to-head goals scored; 5) Goal difference; 6) Goals scored; 7) Fair-play points; 8) Drawing lots (Play-off if the winner has to be decided).
(C) Champions; (D) Disqualified; (R) Relegated

== Results ==
=== Home and away ===
Home \ Away	EAS	HVA	KIT	LEE	PEG	RAN	RES	SOU
Eastern	—	2–1	0–1	3–2	0–0	2–2	5–0	2–1
Happy Valley	1–1	—	1–3	1–4	1–3	2–1	0–1	1–1
Kitchee	1–1	1–1	—	2–2	2–0	3–1	3–0	4–1
Lee Man	2–3	0–0	0–2	—	1–3	0–0	4–0	2–1
Pegasus	0–1	1–0	1–2	1–2	—	2–0	3–2	0–4
Rangers	1–3	2–2	0–0	1–0	0–2	—	0–1	1–2
Resources Capital	0–5	3–0	0–3	1–5	0–1	1–2	—	1–0
Southern	0–5	3–3	1–2	1–2	2–3	3–3	4–1	—

Source: HKFA
Legend: Blue = home team win; Yellow = draw; Red = away team win.

=== Split ===
After 14 matches, the league splits into two groups of four teams. The top four are grouped into the championship group and the bottom four into the relegation group, with the teams playing every other team in their group once (either at home or away). The exact matches are determined by the position of the teams in the league table at the time of the split.

==== Championship Group ====
Home \ Away	KIT	EAS	PEG	LEE
Kitchee	—	2–0	—	0–1
Eastern	—	—	4–0	—
Pegasus	2–1	—	—	1–5
Lee Man	—	2–1	—	—

Source: HKFA
Legend: Blue = home team win; Yellow = draw; Red = away team win.

==== Relegation Group ====
Home \ Away	SOU	RES	RAN	HVA
Southern	—	1–2	—	2–1
Resources Capital	—	—	0–6	—
Rangers	2–2	—	—	3–3
Happy Valley	—	7–2	—	—

Source: HKFA
Legend: Blue = home team win; Yellow = draw; Red = away team win.

== Positions by round ==
To preserve chronological evolvements, any postponed matches are not included to the round at which they were originally scheduled, but added to the full round they were played immediately afterwards. For example, if a match is scheduled for round 7, but then played between rounds 8 and 9, it will be added to the standings for round 8.

Team ╲ Round	1	2	3	4	5	6	7	8	9	10	11	12	13	14
Kitchee	5	6	3	2	1	1	1	1	1	1	1	1	1	1
Eastern	1	1	1	1	2	2	2	2	2	2	2	2	2	2
Pegasus	7	3	2	3	4	3	4	4	3	3	3	3	3	3
Lee Man	6	7	4	4	3	4	3	3	4	4	4	4	4	4
Southern	2	2	5	7	7	8	8	8	8	6	7	7	5	5
Resources Capital	8	8	8	8	8	6	6	7	7	8	6	5	6	6
Rangers	3	5	7	5	5	5	5	6	6	7	5	6	7	7
Happy Valley	4	4	6	6	6	7	7	5	5	5	8	8	8	8

Qualification for the Championship Group
Qualification for the Relegation Group

Source: Hong Kong Football Association website

=== Championship Group ===
Team ╲ Round	15	16	17
Kitchee	1	1	1
Eastern	2	2	2
Lee Man	4	4	3
Pegasus	3	3	4

Leader - AFC Champions League Group Stage
Qualification for AFC Cup Group Stage
Qualification for AFC Cup Qualifying Play-offs

Source: Hong Kong Football Association website

=== Relegation Group ===
Team ╲ Round	15	16	17
Southern	5	5	5
Rangers	6	6	6
Resources Capital	7	7	7
Happy Valley	8	8	8

Source: Hong Kong Football Association website

== Fixtures and results ==
=== Round 1 ===
21 November 2020	Eastern	5–0	Resources Capital	Mong Kok, Kowloon
15:00 (UTC+8)	Sandro 29' (pen.), 70'; Lucas 39', 49' (pen.); Everton 61'	Report		Stadium: Mong Kok Stadium; Attendance: 915; Referee: Liu Kwok Man

21 November 2020	Pegasus	0–4	Southern	Yuen Long, New Territories
17:30 (UTC+8)		Report	Pereira 55', 57', 71'; Ha 63'	Stadium: Yuen Long Stadium; Attendance: 1,368; Referee: Ng Chiu Kok

22 November 2020	Rangers	2–2	Happy Valley	Diamond Hill, Kowloon
15:00 (UTC+8)	Juninho 31'; Yiu Ho Ming 75'	Report	Yuen Sai Kit 22'; Odu 60'	Stadium: Hammer Hill Road Sports Ground; Attendance: 489; Referee: Ho Wai Sing

22 November 2020	Kitchee	2–2	Lee Man	Mong Kok, Kowloon
17:30 (UTC+8)	Orr 26'; Li Ngai Hoi 45+3'	Report	Shapoval 31'; Acosta 50'	Stadium: Mong Kok Stadium; Attendance: 1,775; Referee: Yu Kin Fung

=== Round 2 ===
28 November 2020	Southern	3–3	Rangers	Aberdeen, Hong Kong
15:00 (UTC+8)	Pereira 24'; Ha 71', 77'	Report	Lam Hok Hei 73'; Lo Kwan Yee 85'; Fernando 90'	Stadium: Aberdeen Sports Ground; Attendance: 418; Referee: Woo Chun Sing

28 November 2020	Resources Capital	0–1	Pegasus	Tsing Yi, New Territories
17:30 (UTC+8)		Report	Kessi 30'	Stadium: Tsing Yi Sports Ground; Attendance: 538; Referee: Law Pik Chi

29 November 2020	Kitchee	1–1	Happy Valley	Mong Kok, Kowloon
15:00 (UTC+8)	Li Ngai Hoi 74'	Report	Odu 18'	Stadium: Mong Kok Stadium; Attendance: 1,407; Referee: Lau Fong Hei

29 November 2020	Lee Man	2–3	Eastern	Tseung Kwan O, New Territories
17:30 (UTC+8)	Gil 4'; N'dri 31' (pen.)	Report	Sandro 13'; Lucas 26'; Eduardo 70'	Stadium: Tseung Kwan O Sports Ground; Attendance: 937; Referee: Tam Ping Wun

=== Round 3 ===
27 February 2021	Southern	1–2	Kitchee	Siu Sai Wan, Hong Kong Island
19:00 (UTC+8)	Cahill 77'	Report	Baena 75'; Cleiton 90+1'	Stadium: Siu Sai Wan Sports Ground; Attendance: 561; Referee: Tam Ping Wun

27 February 2021	Happy Valley	1–1	Eastern	Mong Kok, Kowloon
19:00 (UTC+8)	Lam Hin Ting 38'	Report	Lum 57'	Stadium: Mong Kok Stadium; Attendance: 802; Referee: Luk Kin Sun

28 February 2021	Pegasus	2–0	Rangers	So Kon Po, Hong Kong Island
15:00 (UTC+8)	Marquinhos 74', 86'	Report		Stadium: Hong Kong Stadium; Attendance: 545; Referee: Ho Wai Sing

28 February 2021	Resources Capital	1–5	Lee Man	Mong Kok, Kowloon
19:00 (UTC+8)	Tena 90' (pen.)	Report	N'dri 17', 24' (pen.); Gil 45+3'; Kim Seung-yong 58', 90+2'	Stadium: Mong Kok Stadium; Attendance: 763; Referee: Luk Kin Sun

=== Round 4 ===
4 March 2021	Kitchee	2–0	Pegasus	Mong Kok, Kowloon
20:00 (UTC+8)	Damjanović 57', 90+3'	Report		Stadium: Mong Kok Stadium; Attendance: 1,130; Referee: Woo Chun Sing

5 March 2021	Southern	0–5	Eastern	Mong Kok, Kowloon
20:00 (UTC+8)		Report	Eduardo 6'; Lum 21'; Lucas 44'; Sandro 52'; Everton 88'	Stadium: Mong Kok Stadium; Attendance: 1,036; Referee: Liu Kwok Man

6 March 2021	Resources Capital	1–2	Rangers	Tsing Yi, New Territories
15:00 (UTC+8)	Sá 69'	Report	Augusto 33'; Harima 90+4'	Stadium: Tsing Yi Sports Ground; Attendance: 419; Referee: Ho Wai Sing

7 March 2021	Lee Man	0–0	Happy Valley	Tseung Kwan O, New Territories
15:00 (UTC+8)		Report		Stadium: Tseung Kwan O Sports Ground; Attendance: 900; Referee: Lau Fong Hei

=== Round 5 ===
13 March 2021	Lee Man	2–1	Southern	Tseung Kwan O, New Territories
15:00 (UTC+8)	Lee Hong Lim 7'; Gil 11'	Report	Cahill 90+1'	Stadium: Tseung Kwan O Sports Ground; Attendance: 539; Referee: Ng Chiu Kok

14 March 2021	Happy Valley	0–1	Resources Capital	Sham Shui Po, Kowloon
15:00 (UTC+8)		Report	Canal 90+6' (pen.)	Stadium: Sham Shui Po Sports Ground; Attendance: 732; Referee: Yu Kin Fung

14 March 2021	Rangers	0–0	Kitchee	Tsing Yi, New Territories
17:30 (UTC+8)		Report		Stadium: Tsing Yi Sports Ground; Attendance: 678; Referee: Liu Kwok Man

15 March 2021	Eastern	0–0	Pegasus	Mong Kok, Kowloon
20:00 (UTC+8)		Report		Stadium: Mong Kok Stadium; Attendance: 867; Referee: Luk Kin Sun

=== Round 6 ===
10 March 2021	Eastern	0–1	Kitchee	Mong Kok, Kowloon
20:00 (UTC+8)		Report	Damjanović 64'	Stadium: Mong Kok Stadium; Attendance: 2,813; Referee: Tam Ping Wun

21 March 2021	Pegasus	1–0	Happy Valley	Yuen Long, New Territories
15:00 (UTC+8)	Nilson 17'	Report		Stadium: Yuen Long Stadium; Attendance: 1,680; Referee: Law Bik Chi

21 March 2021	Resources Capital	1–0	Southern	Sham Shui Po, Kowloon
15:00 (UTC+8)	Tena 78' (pen.)	Report		Stadium: Sham Shui Po Sports Ground; Attendance: 566; Referee: Poon Chun Kit

21 March 2021	Lee Man	0–0	Rangers	Tseung Kwan O, New Territories
17:30 (UTC+8)		Report		Stadium: Tseung Kwan O Sports Ground; Attendance: 481; Referee: Lau Fong Hei

=== Round 7 ===
27 March 2021	Rangers	1–3	Eastern	Diamond Hill, Kowloon
15:00 (UTC+8)	Lam Hok Hei 89'	Report	Diego 33'; Lucas 52'; Sandro 60'	Stadium: Hammer Hill Road Sports Ground; Attendance: 881; Referee: Tang Hing Fu

27 March 2021	Happy Valley	1–1	Southern	Mong Kok, Kowloon
17:30 (UTC+8)	Odu 6'	Report	Kawase 40'	Stadium: Mong Kok Stadium; Attendance: 1,007; Referee: Wong Wai Lun

28 March 2021	Pegasus	1–2	Lee Man	Yuen Long, New Territories
15:00 (UTC+8)	Marquinhos 45+1' (pen.)	Report	Kim Seung-yong 22'; Bleda 59'	Stadium: Yuen Long Stadium; Attendance: 1,524; Referee: Liu Kwok Man

28 March 2021	Resources Capital	0–3	Kitchee	Tsing Yi, New Territories
17:30 (UTC+8)		Report	Gavilán 56'; Damjanović 60'; Roberto 78'	Stadium: Tsing Yi Sports Ground; Attendance: 671; Referee: Ho Wai Sing

=== Round 8 ===
10 April 2021	Southern	3–3	Happy Valley	Aberdeen, Hong Kong Island
15:00 (UTC+8)	Pereira 38'; Ha 46', 90+6'	Report	Odu 51'; Scott 55'; Chu Wai Kwan 69'	Stadium: Aberdeen Sports Ground; Attendance: 519; Referee: Tang Hing Fu

11 April 2021	Kitchee	3–0	Resources Capital	Mong Kok, Kowloon
15:00 (UTC+8)	Damjanović 12', 64' (pen.); Ho Chun Ting 22'	Report		Stadium: Mong Kok Stadium; Attendance: 1,371; Referee: Ho Wai Sing

11 April 2021	Lee Man	1–3	Pegasus	Tseung Kwan O, New Territories
17:30 (UTC+8)	Recio 12'	Report	Marquinhos 68', 83', 88'	Stadium: Tseung Kwan O Sports Ground; Attendance: 640; Referee: Lau Fong Hei

12 April 2021	Eastern	2–2	Rangers	Mong Kok, Kowloon
20:00 (UTC+8)	Sandro 48'; Clayton 90+4'	Report	Augusto 54'; Lam Ka Wai 58'	Stadium: Mong Kok Stadium; Attendance: 762; Referee: Liu Kwok Man

=== Round 9 ===
3 April 2021	Resources Capital	0–5	Eastern	Tsing Yi, New Territories
15:00 (UTC+8)		Report	Fernando 12', 50'; Emir 31'; Sandro 67'; Khan 76'	Stadium: Tsing Yi Sports Ground; Attendance: 588; Referee: Woo Chun Sing

3 April 2021	Lee Man	0–2	Kitchee	Tseung Kwan O, New Territories
17:30 (UTC+8)		Report	Orr 54'; Gavilán 67'	Stadium: Tseung Kwan O Sports Ground; Attendance: 1,872; Referee: Luk Kin Sun

4 April 2021	Happy Valley	2–1	Rangers	Sham Shui Po, Kowloon
15:00 (UTC+8)	Mikael 85', 90+1' (pen.)	Report	Juninho 39'	Stadium: Sham Shui Po Sports Ground; Attendance: 689; Referee: Ho Wai Sing

5 April 2021	Southern	2–3	Pegasus	Aberdeen, Hong Kong Island
15:00 (UTC+8)	Pereira 20'; Ha 50'	Report	Sun Ming Him 23'; Júnior 52'; Nilson 87'	Stadium: Aberdeen Sports Ground; Attendance: 710; Referee: Liu Kwok Man

=== Round 10 ===
19 March 2021	Kitchee	1–1	Eastern	Mong Kok, Kowloon
20:00 (UTC+8)	Damjanović 49'	Report	Everton 70'	Stadium: Mong Kok Stadium; Attendance: 3,101; Referee: Ho Wai Sing

27 April 2021	Rangers	1–0	Lee Man	Mong Kok, Kowloon
20:00 (UTC+8)	Lo Kwan Yee 13' (pen.)	Report		Stadium: Mong Kok Stadium; Attendance: 610; Referee: Woo Chun Sing

5 May 2021	Southern	4–1	Resources Capital	Aberdeen, Hong Kong Island
15:00 (UTC+8)	Ha 14', 50', 64'; Sasaki 90+4' (pen.)	Report	Sá 89'	Stadium: Aberdeen Sports Ground; Attendance: 308; Referee: Woo Chun Sing

6 May 2021	Happy Valley	1–3	Pegasus	Mong Kok, Kowloon
20:00 (UTC+8)	Odu 24'	Report	Marquinhos 48'; Lai Kak Yi 59'; Nilson 80'	Stadium: Mong Kok Stadium; Attendance: 579; Referee: Luk Kin Sun

=== Round 11 ===
23 April 2021	Southern	1–2	Lee Man	Mong Kok, Kowloon
20:00 (UTC+8)	Ha 30'	Report	Bleda 33', 58' (pen.)	Stadium: Mong Kok Stadium; Attendance: 834; Referee: Yu Kin Fung

24 April 2021	Pegasus	0–1	Eastern	Yuen Long, New Territories
15:00 (UTC+8)		Report	Fernando 90+1'	Stadium: Yuen Long Stadium; Attendance: 2,106; Referee: Luk Kin Sun

24 April 2021	Resources Capital	3–0	Happy Valley	Tsing Yi, New Territories
17:30 (UTC+8)	Sá 5'; Law Chun Yan 16', 33'	Report		Stadium: Tsing Yi Sports Ground; Attendance: 483; Referee: Wong Ka Ho

7 May 2021	Kitchee	3–1	Rangers	Mong Kok, Kowloon
20:00 (UTC+8)	Damjanović 1', 34' (pen.), 42'	Report	Kilama 59'	Stadium: Mong Kok Stadium; Attendance: 1,566; Referee: Yu Kin Fung

=== Round 12 ===
24 March 2021	Pegasus	1–2	Kitchee	Yuen Long, New Territories
19:00 (UTC+8)	Sun Ming Him 75'	Report	Gavilán 29' (pen.); Orr 90+2'	Stadium: Yuen Long Stadium; Attendance: 1,215; Referee: Yu Kin Fung

30 April 2021	Eastern	2–1	Southern	Mong Kok, Kowloon
20:00 (UTC+8)	Chung Wai Keung 34'; Sandro 90+3'	Report	Kawase 62'	Stadium: Mong Kok Stadium; Attendance: 1,138; Referee: Liu Kwok Man

2 May 2021	Rangers	0–1	Resources Capital	Diamond Hill, Kowloon
15:00 (UTC+8)		Report	Wong Wai Kwok 75'	Stadium: Hammer Hill Road Sports Ground; Attendance: 464; Referee: Luk Kin Sun

2 May 2021	Happy Valley	1–4	Lee Man	Sham Shui Po, Kowloon
15:00 (UTC+8)	Scott 5'	Report	Shapoval 38'; Kim Seung-yong 69'; Gil 80'; To Chun Kiu 90+2' (o.g.)	Stadium: Sham Shui Po Sports Ground; Attendance: 559; Referee: Ng Chiu Kok

=== Round 13 ===
16 April 2021	Happy Valley	1–3	Kitchee	Mong Kok, Kowloon
20:00 (UTC+8)	Wong Ho Yin 75'	Report	Damjanović 31', 42', 55'	Stadium: Mong Kok Stadium; Attendance: 1,635; Referee: Woo Chun Sing

17 April 2021	Eastern	3–2	Lee Man	Mong Kok, Kowloon
15:00 (UTC+8)	Sandro 50'; Chung Wai Keung 57'; Fernando 87'	Report	Gil 2'; Lee Hong Lim 14'	Stadium: Mong Kok Stadium; Attendance: 1,168; Referee: Luk Kin Sun

18 April 2021	Rangers	1–2	Southern	Diamond Hill, Kowloon
15:00 (UTC+8)	Augusto 90+2'	Report	Pereira 9', 82'	Stadium: Hammer Hill Road Sports Ground; Attendance: 584; Referee: Liu Kwok Man

18 April 2021	Pegasus	3–2	Resources Capital	Yuen Long, New Territories
17:30 (UTC+8)	Nilson 38', 60'; Fábio 83'	Report	Sá 22'; Liu Yik Shing 57'	Stadium: Yuen Long Stadium; Attendance: 1,435; Referee: Poon Chun Kit

=== Round 14 ===
9 May 2021	Lee Man	4–0	Resources Capital	Sham Shui Po, Kowloon
15:00 (UTC+8)	Gil 21', 70', 75'; Wong Chun Ho 45'	Report		Stadium: Sham Shui Po Sports Ground; Attendance: 595; Referee: Wong Wai Lun

9 May 2021	Eastern	2–1	Happy Valley	Mong Kok, Kowloon
20:00 (UTC+8)	Sandro 18'; Dudu 60'	Report	Lee Ka Yiu 29' (o.g.)	Stadium: Mong Kok Stadium; Attendance: 470; Referee: Woo Chun Sing

10 May 2021	Kitchee	4–1	Southern	Mong Kok, Kowloon
20:00 (UTC+8)	Tomas 8'; Damjanović 19', 36'; Gavilán 66'	Report	Pereira 26'	Stadium: Mong Kok Stadium; Attendance: 1,221; Referee: Luk Kin Sun

11 May 2021	Rangers	0–2	Pegasus	Mong Kok, Kowloon
20:00 (UTC+8)		Report	Law Hiu Chung 29'; Nilson 75'	Stadium: Mong Kok Stadium; Attendance: 586; Referee: Liu Kwok Man

=== Round 15 ===
15 May 2021	Eastern	4–0	Pegasus	Siu Sai Wan, Hong Kong Island
15:00 (UTC+8)	Sandro 23'; Clayton 31'; Lum 59', 83'	Report		Stadium: Siu Sai Wan Sports Ground; Attendance: 556; Referee: Yu Kin Fung

15 May 2021	Kitchee	0–1	Lee Man	Mong Kok, Kowloon
17:30 (UTC+8)		Report	Gil 90+5'	Stadium: Mong Kok Stadium; Attendance: 1,422; Referee: Tam Ping Wun

16 May 2021	Southern	2–1	Happy Valley	Siu Sai Wan, Hong Kong Island
15:00 (UTC+8)	Rehman 12'; Ha 39'	Report	Yuen Sai Kit 86'	Stadium: Siu Sai Wan Sports Ground; Attendance: 616; Referee: Tang Hing Fu

16 May 2021	Resources Capital	0–6	Rangers	Siu Sai Wan, Hong Kong Island
17:30 (UTC+8)		Report	Chan Siu Kwan 5', 32'; Juninho 37', 47'; Wong Chun Hin 61'; Lo Kwan Yee 85'	Stadium: Siu Sai Wan Sports Ground; Attendance: 616; Referee: Lau Fong Hei

=== Round 16 ===
18 May 2021	Lee Man	2–1	Eastern	Mong Kok, Kowloon
20:00 (UTC+8)	Ngan Lok Fung 11'; Tsui Wang Kit 88'	Report	Fernando 84'	Stadium: Mong Kok Stadium; Attendance: 1,491; Referee: Woo Chun Sing

19 May 2021	Pegasus	2–1	Kitchee	Mong Kok, Kowloon
20:00 (UTC+8)	Sun Ming Him 8'; Lau Hok Ming 58'	Report	Benhaddouche 56'	Stadium: Mong Kok Stadium; Attendance: 1,357; Referee: Lau Fong Hei

22 May 2021	Rangers	2–2	Southern	Siu Sai Wan, Hong Kong Island
16:00 (UTC+8)	Lo Kwan Yee 43' (pen.); Juninho 45+1'	Report	Kawase 46'; Ha 90+4'	Stadium: Siu Sai Wan Sports Ground; Attendance: 726; Referee: Wong Wai Lun

22 May 2021	Happy Valley	7–2	Resources Capital	Siu Sai Wan, Hong Kong Island
18:30 (UTC+8)	Mikael 20', 71'; Luciano 58', 60', 89'; Adegbite 63'; Scott 90+2'	Report	Sá 22', 40'	Stadium: Siu Sai Wan Sports Ground; Attendance: 726; Referee: Liu Kwok Man

=== Round 17 ===
23 May 2021	Kitchee	2–0	Eastern	So Kon Po, Hong Kong Island
16:00 (UTC+8)	Damjanović 45+3', 71'	Report		Stadium: Hong Kong Stadium; Attendance: 7,802; Referee: Luk Kin Sun

23 May 2021	Pegasus	1–5	Lee Man	Mong Kok, Kowloon
20:00 (UTC+8)	Sun Ming Him 66'	Report	Wong Chun Ho 17'; Gil 48', 71', 85' (pen.); Lee Hong Lim 65'	Stadium: Mong Kok Stadium; Attendance: 1,632; Referee: Tam Ping Wun

30 May 2021	Southern	1–2	Resources Capital	Mong Kok, Kowloon
17:30 (UTC+8)	Sasaki 20'	Report	Cheng King Ho 51'; Yue Tze Nam 65'	Stadium: Mong Kok Stadium; Attendance: 1,009; Referee: Ng Chiu Kok

30 May 2021	Rangers	3–3	Happy Valley	Siu Sai Wan, Hong Kong Island
17:30 (UTC+8)	Lam Hok Hei 8', 63'; Augusto 49'	Report	Yip Cheuk Man 34'; Luciano 54'; Chu Wai Kwan 80'	Stadium: Siu Sai Wan Sports Ground; Attendance: 357; Referee: Poon Chun Kit

== Season statistics ==
=== Top scorers ===
As of the end of the season

Rank	Player	Club	Goals
1	(Montenegro) Dejan Damjanović	Kitchee	17
2	(Hong Kong) James Ha	Southern	12
2	(Brazil) Gil	Lee Man	12
4	(Hong Kong) Sandro	Eastern	11
5	(Brazil) Stefan Pereira	Southern	9
6	(Brazil) Marquinhos	Pegasus	7
7	(Brazil) Felipe Sá	Resources Capital	6
7	(Brazil) Nilson	Pegasus	6
9	(Brazil) Lucas Silva	Eastern	5
9	(Nigeria) Robert Odu	Happy Valley	5
9	(Hong Kong) Fernando	Eastern	5
9	(Brazil) Juninho	Rangers	5

=== Hat-tricks ===
Note: The results column shows the scorer's team score first. Teams in bold are home teams.

#	Player	For	Against	Result	Date	Ref
1	(Brazil) Stefan Pereira	**Southern**	Pegasus	4–0	21 November 2020	
2	(Brazil) Marquinhos	**Pegasus**	Lee Man	3–1	11 April 2021	
3	(Montenegro) Dejan Damjanović	**Kitchee**	Happy Valley	3–1	16 April 2021	
4	(Hong Kong) James Ha	**Southern**	Resources Capital	4–1	5 May 2021	
5	(Montenegro) Dejan Damjanović	**Kitchee**	Rangers	3–1	7 May 2021	
6	(Brazil) Gil	**Lee Man**	Resources Capital	4–0	9 May 2021	
7	(Brazil) Luciano	**Happy Valley**	Resources Capital	7–2	22 May 2021	
8	(Brazil) Gil	Lee Man	**Pegasus**	5–1	23 May 2021	

=== Clean sheets ===
Rank	Player	Club	Match(es)
1	(Hong Kong) Wang Zhenpeng	Kitchee	6
2	(Hong Kong) Yapp Hung Fai	Eastern	5
3	(Hong Kong) Lam Chun Kit	Resources Capital	4
3	(Hong Kong) Yuen Ho Chun	Lee Man	4
3	(Ukraine) Oleksii Shliakotin	Rangers	4
6	(Hong Kong) Leung Hing Kit	Pegasus	3
7	(Hong Kong) Tse Tak Him	Southern	1
7	(Hong Kong) To Chun Kiu	Happy Valley	1
7	(Hong Kong) Felix Luk	Pegasus	1
7	(Hong Kong) Tsang Man Fai	Eastern	1
7	(Hong Kong) Paulo César	Kitchee	1

== Attendances ==
As of matches played 11 May 2021

Pos	Team	Total	High	Low	Average	Change
1	Kitchee	11,571	3,101	1,130	1,653	−14.0%
2	Pegasus	9,873	2,106	545	1,410	+155.9%
3	Eastern	8,133	2,813	470	1,162	+44.7%
4	Happy Valley	6,003	1,635	559	858	+54.6%
5	Lee Man	5,964	1,872	481	852	−2.9%
6	Southern	4,386	1,036	308	627	−27.2%
7	Rangers	4,292	881	464	613	+63.5%
8	Resources Capital	4,028	763	419	575	n/a^{1}
	League total	54,250	3,101	308	969	+22.2%

Source: HKFA
Notes:
1: Team did not play in the Premier League last season

== Awards ==
=== Monthly Most Valuable Player ===
Month	Most Valuable Player		References
Month	Player	Club	References
October & November	(Hong Kong) Sandro	Eastern	
February & March	(Montenegro) Dejan Damjanović	Kitchee	
April	(Hong Kong) Leung Hing Kit	Pegasus	
May	(Montenegro) Dejan Damjanović	Kitchee	

=== Hong Kong Top Footballer Awards ===
Awards	Prize Winner	Club	Votes
Footballer of the Year	(Montenegro) Dejan Damjanović	Kitchee	77.34%
Women's Footballer of the Year	(Hong Kong) Lau Yun Yi	Tai Po (Women)	9
Coach of the Year	(Hong Kong) Chu Chi Kwong	Kitchee	35.76%
Young Players of the Year	(Hong Kong) Sun Ming Him	Pegasus	49.57%
Young Players of the Year	(Hong Kong) Ho Chun Ting	Kitchee	42.26%
Players' Player	(England) Charlie Scott	Happy Valley	32
Most Favorite Player	(Hong Kong) Dani Cancela	Kitchee	2,367
Hong Kong Top Footballers
Goalkeeper	(Hong Kong) Yapp Hung Fai	Eastern	32.52%
Defenders	(Hong Kong) Dani Cancela	Kitchee	51.63%
Defenders	(Brazil) Eduardo Praes	Eastern	49.61%
Defenders	(Brazil) Júnior Goiano	Pegasus	36.65%
Defenders	(Hong Kong) Hélio	Kitchee	26.45%
Midfielders	(Brazil) Marquinhos	Pegasus	53.92%
Midfielders	(Hong Kong) Ngan Lok Fung	Lee Man	43.40%
Midfielders	(England) Charlie Scott	Happy Valley	31.80%
Midfielders	(Brazil) Cleiton	Kitchee	28.12%
Forwards	(Montenegro) Dejan Damjanović	Kitchee	77.34%
Forwards	(Hong Kong) Sandro	Eastern	47.63%

== Remarks ==
1. Match was played behind closed doors due to the 2020 coronavirus pandemic in Hong Kong.
