= Chang Hei Yin =

Hong Kong footballer

Chang Hei Yin 張熹延
Personal information
- Full name: Marcus Chang Hei Yin
- Date of birth: 6 April 2000 (age 26)
- Place of birth: Hong Kong
- Height: 1.74 m (5 ft 9 in)
- Position: Midfielder

Team information
- Current team: Tai Po
- Number: 7

Youth career
- 2017–2018: Pegasus

Senior career*
Years	Team	Apps	(Gls)
2018–2020	Pegasus	5	(0)
2020–2026	Lee Man	45	(7)
2025–2026	→ Eastern District (loan)	15	(0)
2026–	Tai Po	8	(2)

International career^{‡}
2021–2023	Hong Kong U-23	7	(0)
2023–2024	Hong Kong	5	(0)
- * Club domestic league appearances and goals as of 21 November 2026 ‡ National team caps and goals as of 19 January 2024

Marcus Chang Hei Yin (Chinese: 張熹延; born 6 April 2000) is a Hong Kong professional footballer who currently plays as a midfielder for Hong Kong Premier League club Tai Po.

== Club career ==
In August 2018, Chang graduated from the Pegasus Academy and was promoted to the first team.

On 3 July 2020, Lee Man revealed that they had signed Chang.

On 23 July 2025, Chang joined Eastern District on loan for the 2025–26 season.

On 16 July 2026, Chang joined Tai Po.

== International career ==
On 19 June 2023, Chang made his international debut for Hong Kong in a friendly match against Thailand.

On 26 December 2023, Chang was named in Hong Kong's squad for the 2023 AFC Asian Cup.

== Career statistics ==
=== Club ===
As of 7 October 2023

Club	Season	League			National Cup		Other Cups		Continental		Other		Total	
Club	Season	Division	Apps	Goals	Apps	Goals	Apps	Goals	Apps	Goals	Apps	Goals	Apps	Goals
Pegasus	2018–19	Hong Kong Premier League	3	0	0	0	5 (Note: Appearances in the Sapling Cup)	0	0	0	0	0	8	0
Pegasus	2019–20	Hong Kong Premier League	2	0	0	0	8	1	0	0	0	0	10	1
Total			5	0	0	0	13	1	0	0	0	0	15	1
Lee Man	2019–20	Hong Kong Premier League	3	0	0	0	0	0	0	0	0	0	0	0
Lee Man	2020–21	Hong Kong Premier League	5	0	0	0	6	1	1 (Note: Appearances in the AFC Cup)	0	0	0	12	1
Lee Man	2021–22	Hong Kong Premier League	2	3	1	0	7	0	3	1	0	0	13	4
Lee Man	2022–23	Hong Kong Premier League	13	3	1	0	4	0	0	0	1 (Note: Appearances in the Senior Shield)	0	19	3
Lee Man	2023–24	Hong Kong Premier League	2	0	0	0	0	0	2 (Note: Appearances in the AFC Champions League qualificaion)	0	0	0	4	0
Total			25	6	2	0	17	1	6	1	1	0	48	8
Career total			30	6	2	0	30	2	6	1	1	0	63	9

=== International ===
As of 19 January 2024

National team	Year	Apps	Goals
Hong Kong	2023	3	0
Hong Kong	2024	2	0
Total		5	0

#	Date	Venue	Opponent	Result	Competition
2023
1	19 June 2023	Hong Kong Stadium, So Kon Po, Hong Kong	Thailand	0–1	Friendly
2	7 September 2023	Phnom Penh Olympic Stadium, Phnom Penh, Hong Kong	Cambodia	1–1	Friendly
3	11 September 2023	Hong Kong Stadium, So Kon Po, Hong Kong	Brunei	10–0	Friendly
2024
4	1 January 2024	Baniyas Stadium, Abu Dhabi, United Arab Emirates	China	2–1	Friendly
5	19 January 2024	Khalifa International Stadium, Al Rayyan, Qatar	Iran	0–1	2023 AFC Asian Cup

== Honour ==
Lee Man

- Hong Kong Premier League: 2023–24
