= Robert Odu =

Nigerian footballer (born 1999)

Personal information
- Full name: Robert Odu
- Date of birth: 30 April 1999 (age 27)
- Place of birth: Obudu, Nigeria
- Height: 1.80 m (5 ft 11 in)
- Position: Striker

College career
| Years | Team | Apps | (Gls) |
| 2015–2019 | UNILAG Marines | | |

Senior career*
| Years | Team | Apps | (Gls) |
| 2018–2020 | Star Base | 16 | (13) |
| 2019 | → First Bank (loan) | 4 | (1) |
| 2019–2020 | → Remo Stars (loan) | 1 | (0) |
| 2020–2021 | Happy Valley | 12 | (5) |
| 2021 | Extremadura | 0 | (0) |
| 2022–2023 | Qilwah | | |
| 2023 | Resources Capital | 6 | (0) |
| 2023 | Southern | 1 | (0) |
| 2024 | Al-Saqer | | |
| 2025 | Jwaya | 9 | (5) |
| 2025 | Al-Ramtha | 2 | (0) |
| 2026– | Al-Jaish | | |
- * Club domestic league appearances and goals as of 17:52, 11 August 2025 (UTC)

Robert Odu (born 30 April 1999) is a Nigerian professional footballer who plays as a forward.

== Club career ==
In June 2019, Odu was loaned from his club Star Base to Nigeria National League club First Bank until the end of the season.

On 30 November 2019, Remo Stars acquired Odu on a two-year loan with an option to buy.

On 28 October 2020, it was announced that Odu had signed with Hong Kong Premier League club Happy Valley.

On 1 August 2022, Odu joined Saudi Arabian club Qilwah.

On 23 February 2023, Odu returned to Hong Kong and joined Resources Capital.

On 11 June 2023, Odu joined Southern.

On 16 January 2024, Odu joined Saudi club Al-Saqer.

== Career statistics ==
=== Club ===
As of 24 April 2020

| Club | Season | League | | | National Cup | | League Cup | | Continental | | Other | | Total | |
| Club | Season | Division | Apps | Goals | Apps | Goals | Apps | Goals | Apps | Goals | Apps | Goals | Apps | Goals |
|---|---|---|---|---|---|---|---|---|---|---|---|---|---|---|
| StarBase F.C. | 2018–20 | Surulere Regional League | 16 | 13 | 2 | 2 | 0 | 0 | – | | 25 | 23 | 43 | 38 |
| StarBase F.C. | Total | | 16 | 13 | 2 | 2 | 0 | 0 | 0 | 0 | 25 | 23 | 43 | 38 |
| First Bank F.C. | 2019 | Nigeria National League | 4 | 1 | 0 | 0 | 0 | 0 | – | | 0 | 0 | 4 | 1 |
| Remo Stars F.C. | 2019–20 | Nigeria National League | 1 | 0 | 0 | 0 | 0 | 0 | – | | 0 | 0 | 1 | 0 |
| Happy Valley | 2020–21 | Hong Kong Premier League | 7 | 4 | 0 | 0 | 0 | 0 | – | | 4 (Note: Appearances in the Hong Kong Sapling Cup) | 3 | 11 | 7 |
| Career total | | | 12 | 5 | 0 | 0 | 0 | 0 | 0 | 0 | 3 | 3 | 16 | 8 |
