= Matthew Hoare =

English footballer

Personal information
- Full name: Matthew David Hoare
- Date of birth: 3 May 1995 (age 31)
- Position: Midfielder

Senior career*
Years	Team	Apps	(Gls)
2016–2017	HKFC	12	(0)
2017–2021	Wing Yee	72	(23)
2021–2022	HKFC	4	(0)
- * Club domestic league appearances and goals as of 22 August 2022

Matthew David Hoare (born 3 May 1995) is an English former professional footballer.

== Career statistics ==
=== Club ===
As of 26 October 2021

Appearances and goals by club, season and competition
Club	Season	League			Cup		League Cup		Total	
Club	Season	Division	Apps	Goals	Apps	Goals	Apps	Goals	Apps	Goals
HKFC	2016–17	Premier League	12	0	0	0	0	0	12	0
Wing Yee	2017–18	First Division	25	10	5 (Note: Appearances in the Hong Kong FA Cup Junior Division)	3	0	0	30	13
Wing Yee	2018–19	First Division	22	5	4	3	0	0	26	8
Wing Yee	2019–20	First Division	12	4	0	0	0	0	12	4
Wing Yee	2020–21	First Division	13	4	0	0	0	0	13	4
Wing Yee	Total		72	23	9	6	0	0	81	29
HKFC	2021–22	Premier League	1	0	0	0	4 (Note: Appearances in the Sapling Cup)	0	5	0
