= Antoine Sahaghian =

French footballer (born 1988)

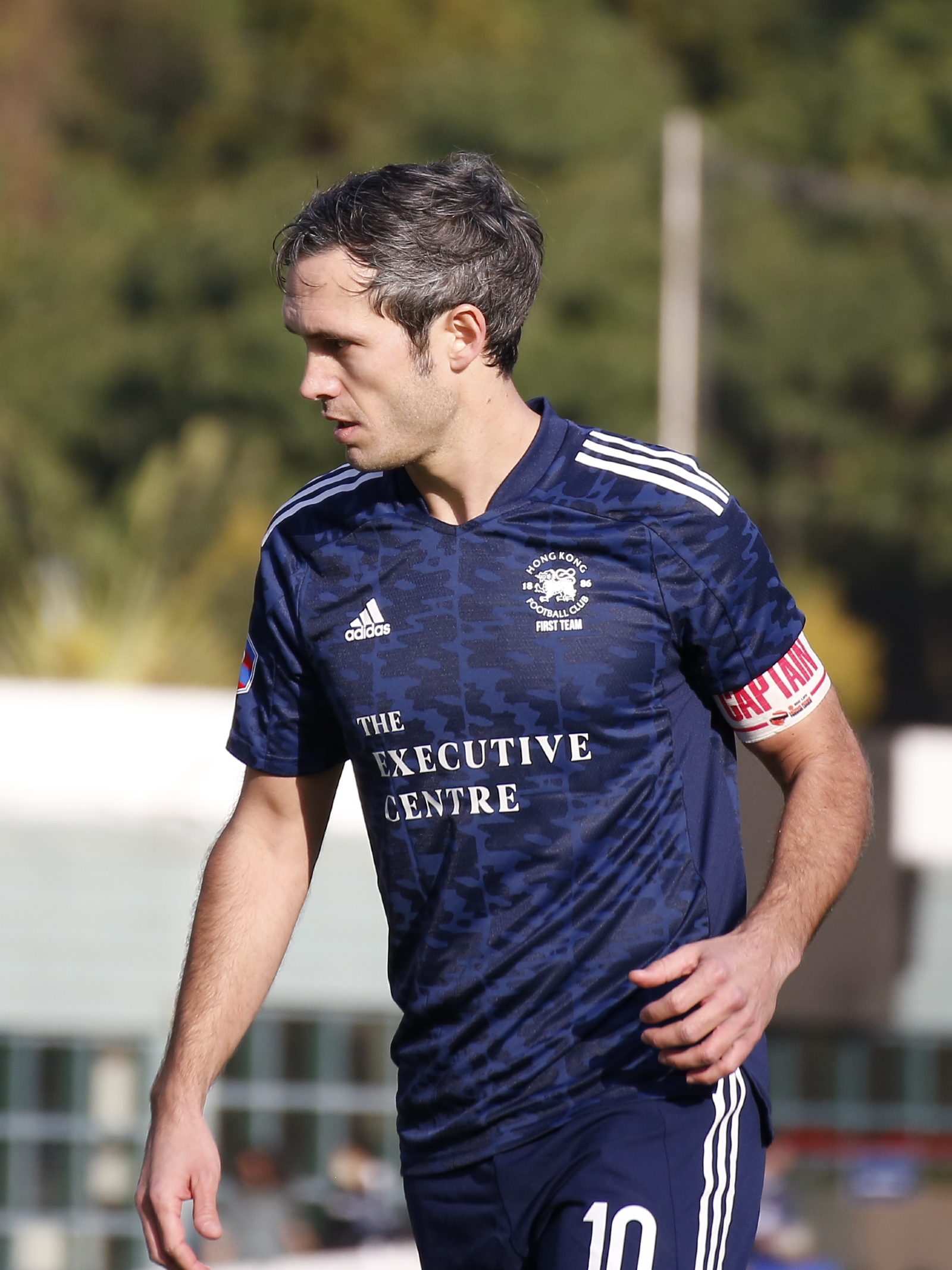

Personal information
- Full name: Antoine Gael Sahaghian
- Date of birth: 16 December 1988 (age 37)
- Place of birth: France
- Height: 1.84 m (6 ft 0 in)
- Position: Midfielder

Senior career*
| Years | Team | Apps | (Gls) |
| 2014–2016 | HKFC | 27 | (12) |
| 2017–2023 | HKFC | 76 | (39) |
- * Club domestic league appearances and goals as of 5 August 2023

Antoine Gael Sahaghian (born 16 December 1988) is a French former professional footballer who played as a midfielder.

== Career statistics ==
=== Club ===
As of 26 October 2021

Appearances and goals by club, season and competition
| Club | Season | League | | | Cup | | League Cup | | Total | |
| Club | Season | Division | Apps | Goals | Apps | Goals | Apps | Goals | Apps | Goals |
|---|---|---|---|---|---|---|---|---|---|---|
| HKFC | 2014–15 | First Division | 16 | 9 | 0 | 0 | 0 | 0 | 16 | 9 |
| HKFC | 2015–16 | First Division | 11 | 3 | 0 | 0 | 0 | 0 | 11 | 3 |
| HKFC | Total | | 27 | 12 | 0 | 0 | 0 | 0 | 27 | 12 |
| HKFC | 2017–18 | First Division | 23 | 17 | 0 | 0 | 0 | 0 | 23 | 17 |
| HKFC | 2018–19 | First Division | 17 | 10 | 0 | 0 | 0 | 0 | 17 | 10 |
| HKFC | 2019–20 | First Division | 10 | 3 | 0 | 0 | 0 | 0 | 10 | 3 |
| HKFC | 2020–21 | First Division | 9 | 7 | 0 | 0 | 0 | 0 | 9 | 7 |
| HKFC | 2021–22 | Premier League | 1 | 0 | 0 | 0 | 4 (Note: Appearances in the Sapling Cup) | 0 | 5 | 0 |
| HKFC | Total | | 60 | 37 | 0 | 0 | 4 | 0 | 64 | 37 |
