= Matthew Cahill =

Australian soccer player

Personal information
- Full name: Matthew John Cahill
- Date of birth: 6 August 2000 (age 26)
- Place of birth: Gosford, Australia
- Height: 1.83 m (6 ft 0 in)
- Position: Forward

Team information
- Current team: North West Sydney Spirit

Youth career
- 2014–2015: Newcastle Jets
- 2015–2019: Central Coast Mariners

College career
Years	Team	Apps	(Gls)
2019	Milwaukee Panthers	12	(2)

Senior career*
Years	Team	Apps	(Gls)
2019–2021	CCM Academy	17	(12)
2020–2021	Central Coast Mariners	0	(0)
2020–2021	→ Southern (loan)	9	(2)
2022	APIA Leichhardt	13	(1)
2023–	North West Sydney Spirit	30	(7)
- * Club domestic league appearances and goals as of 9 October 2023

Matthew John Cahill (born 6 August 2000) is an Australian professional soccer player who currently plays as a forward for National Premier Leagues NSW club North West Sydney Spirit.

== Career statistics ==
=== Club ===
As of 30 April 2021.

Appearances and goals by club, season and competition
Club	Season	League			National Cup		League Cup		Other		Total	
Club	Season	Division	Apps	Goals	Apps	Goals	Apps	Goals	Apps	Goals	Apps	Goals
CCM Academy	2020	NPL NSW2	11	9	–		–		0	0	11	9
Central Coast Mariners	2020–21	A-League	0	0	0	0	–		0	0	0	0
Southern (loan)	2020–21	Hong Kong Premier League	9	2	0	0	1 (Note: Appearances in the Hong Kong Sapling Cup.)	0	0	0	10	2
Career total			20	11	0	0	1	0	0	0	21	11
