= Augusto Neto =

Brazilian footballer (born 1996)

Personal information
- Full name: Augusto Carvalho da Silva Neto
- Date of birth: 2 August 1996 (age 30)
- Place of birth: Salvador, Brazil
- Height: 1.90 m (6 ft 3 in)
- Position: Forward

Team information
- Current team: Americano

Senior career*
Years	Team	Apps	(Gls)
2016	Fortaleza	5	(0)
2017	Santa Rita	3	(1)
2017–2018	Canelas 2010	15	(3)
2018–2020	Pedras Rubras	17	(1)
2020–2021	Hong Kong Rangers	11	(3)
2021–2022	Al-Mina'a	0	(0)
2022–2023	Hong Kong Rangers	2	(0)
2023	Flamurtari	8	(0)
2023–2024	PSIM Yogyakarta	9	(1)
2025	Goiânia	4	(0)
2025–	Americano	6	(0)
- * Club domestic league appearances and goals as of 28 June 2025

Augusto Carvalho da Silva Neto (born 2 August 1996), commonly known as Augusto Neto, is a Brazilian professional footballer who plays as a forward for Americano.

== Career statistics ==
=== Club ===
As of 6 March 2021.

Appearances and goals by club, season and competition
Club	Season	League			State League		National Cup		League Cup		Other		Total	
Club	Season	Division	Apps	Goals	Apps	Goals	Apps	Goals	Apps	Goals	Apps	Goals	Apps	Goals
Fortaleza	2016	Série C	0	0	4 (Note: Appearances in the Campeonato Cearense)	0	0	0	–		1 (Note: Appearances in the Copa do Nordeste)	0	5	0
Santa Rita	2017	–			3 (Note: Appearances in the Campeonato Alagoano)	1	0	0	–		0	0	3	1
Canelas 2010	2017–18	Campeonato de Portugal	15	3	–		2 (Note: Appearances in the Taça de Portugal)	0	0	0	0	0	17	3
Pedras Rubras	2017–18	Campeonato de Portugal	19	2	–		0	0	0	0	0	0	19	2
Rangers	2020–21	Hong Kong Premier League	3	1	–		0	0	0	0	0	0	3	1
Al-Mina'a	2021–22	Iraqi Premier League	0	0	–		0	0	–		–		0	0
Career total			37	6	7	1	2	0	1	0	1	0	48	7
