= 41st Guangdong–Hong Kong Cup =

- Event: Guangdong–Hong Kong Cup
Guangdong	Hong Kong
2	5

First leg
Guangdong	Hong Kong
2	1
- Date: 6 January 2019
- Venue: Guangdong Provincial People's Stadium, Guangzhou, Guangdong
- Referee: Li Haixin
- Weather: Overcast / 16°C

Second leg
Hong Kong	Guangdong
4	0
- Date: 9 January 2019
- Venue: Hong Kong Stadium, So Kon Po, Hong Kong
- Referee: Tam Ping Wun
- Attendance: 4,096
- Weather: Overcast / 17°C

The 41st Guangdong–Hong Kong Cup was held on 6 and 9 January 2019. Hong Kong retained the trophy, beating Guangdong 5–2 on aggregate.

== Squads ==
=== Guangdong ===
- Head coach: Chen Yuliang
- Assistant coach: Wen Zhijun, Peng Changying, Ling Xiaojun, Pan Weiming

No.	Pos.	Player	Date of birth (age)	Caps	Club
1	GK	Yang Chao	3 August 1993 (aged 25)		(China) Meixian Techand
2	DF	Zeng Yuming	22 January 1997 (aged 21)		(China) Shandong Luneng
3	DF	Gong Liangxuan	12 May 1993 (aged 25)		(China) Guangzhou Evergrande
4	DF	Chen Zijie	19 January 1997 (aged 21)		(China) Guangzhou Evergrande
6	MF	Zhu Haiwei	9 October 1991 (aged 27)		(China) Zhejiang Greentown
7	MF	Li Zhilang	22 August 1991 (aged 27)		(China) Meizhou Hakka
8	MF	Deng Yubiao	8 June 1997 (aged 21)		(China) Guangzhou Evergrande
9	FW	Yang Chaosheng	22 July 1993 (aged 25)		Unattached
10	MF	Ye Chugui	8 September 1994 (aged 24)		(China) Guangzhou R&F
12	GK	Fang Zihong	6 February 1998 (aged 20)		(China) Guangzhou Evergrande
13	MF	Ning An	8 October 1995 (aged 23)		(Hong Kong) R&F
14	DF	Huang Yuanqiang	25 March 1997 (aged 21)		(China) Meixian Techand
15	MF	Wang Peng	16 November 1997 (aged 21)		(China) Guangzhou R&F
16	MF	Yu Jianfeng	29 January 1989 (aged 29)		(China) Nantong Zhiyun
17	MF	Zhong Juzhan	29 April 1993 (aged 25)		(China) Yinchuan Helanshan
20	DF	Zhong Zhigang	27 January 1997 (aged 21)		(China) Lhasa Urban Construction Investment
21	FW	Cai Jingyuan	1 January 1987 (aged 32)		(China) Shenzhen
22	GK	Hou Yu	20 December 1990 (aged 28)		(China) Meizhou Hakka
23	MF	Lu Lin (Captain)	3 February 1985 (aged 33)		(China) Guangzhou R&F
24	MF	Hu Weiwei	3 March 1993 (aged 25)		Unattached
27	FW	Hu Yangyang	18 October 1995 (aged 23)		(China) Hainan Boying
26	MF	Hou Yu	31 January 2001 (aged 17)		(China) Guangzhou Evergrande
29	FW	Xu Jiajun	29 May 1995 (aged 23)		(China) Yanbian Beiguo
32	MF	Chen Zhizhao	14 March 1988 (aged 30)		(China) Guangzhou R&F
33	DF	Chen Jianlong	14 May 1989 (aged 29)		(China) Meizhou Hakka
37	DF	Li Junfeng	8 August 1997 (aged 21)		(Portugal) Coimbrões
38	DF	Tu Dongxu	13 November 1991 (aged 27)		(China) Meixian Techand

=== Hong Kong ===
The final 23-man squad of Hong Kong was announced on 3 January 2019.

- Head coach: Kwok Kar Lok

No.	Pos.	Player	Date of birth (age)	Caps	Club
1	GK	Tse Ka Wing	4 September 1999 (aged 19)		(Hong Kong) Dreams FC
2	DF	Law Tsz Chun	2 March 1997 (aged 21)		(Hong Kong) Kitchee
3	DF	Yu Wai Lim	21 September 1998 (aged 20)		(Hong Kong) Lee Man
4	DF	Poon Pak On	24 June 1999 (aged 19)		(Hong Kong) Dreams
5	DF	Leung Nok Hang	14 November 1994 (aged 24)		(Hong Kong) R&F
6	MF	Wu Chun Ming (Captain)	21 November 1997 (aged 21)		(Hong Kong) Pegasus
7	MF	Remi Dujardin	23 June 1997 (aged 21)		(United States) St. Bonaventure Bonnies
8	FW	Chan Kwong Ho	31 December 1996 (aged 22)		(Hong Kong) Yuen Long
9	FW	Yuen Chun Sing	16 February 1993 (aged 25)		(Hong Kong) R&F
10	MF	Cheng Chin Lung	7 January 1998 (aged 20)		(Hong Kong) Kitchee
11	FW	Cheng Siu Kwan	13 January 1997 (aged 21)		(Hong Kong) Lee Man
12	DF	Chung Sing Lam	14 August 1998 (aged 20)		(Hong Kong) Rangers
13	MF	Ho Chun Ting	18 December 1998 (aged 20)		(Hong Kong) Hoi King
14	DF	Chan Ching Him	18 April 1998 (aged 20)		(Hong Kong) Eastern
15	MF	Yue Tze Nam	12 May 1998 (aged 20)		(Hong Kong) Eastern
16	FW	Sun Ming Him	19 June 2000 (aged 18)		(Hong Kong) Hoi King
17	FW	Jordan Lam	2 February 1999 (aged 19)		(Hong Kong) Dreams FC
18	GK	Ko Chun	17 February 1998 (aged 20)		(Hong Kong) Lee Man
19	GK	Choy Tsz To	4 September 1999 (aged 19)		(Hong Kong) Southern
20	FW	Hirokane Harima	31 January 1998 (aged 20)		(Hong Kong) Hoi King
21	FW	Peng Lin Lin	18 August 1998 (aged 20)		(Hong Kong) Dreams FC
22	FW	Matt Orr	1 January 1997 (aged 22)		(United States) San Francisco
27	FW	Cheng Tsz Sum	20 March 1999 (aged 19)		(Hong Kong) Tai Po

== Match details ==
=== First leg ===
6 January 2019
15:30 UTC+8

Guangdong	2–1	Hong Kong
Lu Lin 45+3' (pen.); Chen Zijie 50'	Report	Jordan Lam 90+1'

Guangdong Provincial People's Stadium, Guangzhou, Guangdong
Referee: Li Haixin (China PR)

=== Second leg ===
9 January 2019
20:00 UTC+8

Hong Kong	4–0	Guangdong
Matt Orr 22'; Leung Nok Hang 50'; Yuen Chun Sing 56' (pen.); Yue Tze Nam 71'	Report

Hong Kong Stadium, So Kon Po, Hong Kong
Attendance: 4,096
Referee: Tam Ping Wun (Hong Kong)

Hong Kong won 5–2 on aggregate.
