= Chan Wai Hin =

Hong Kong footballer (born 2001)

Personal information
- Full name: Anthony Chan Wai Hin
- Date of birth: 19 January 2001 (age 25)
- Place of birth: Hong Kong
- Height: 1.74 m (5 ft 9 in)
- Position: Defender

Youth career
- –2018: CFCSSHK

Senior career*
Years	Team	Apps	(Gls)
2018–2020	CFCSSHK	21	(0)
2020–2021	Happy Valley	0	(0)
2021–2022	HKFC	0	(0)
2022	Kowloon City	0	(0)
2022–2023	Wing Yee	3	(0)
2023–2024	CFCSSHK	40	(3)
2024–2025	Yau Tsim Mong	10	(2)
- * Club domestic league appearances and goals as of 14 April 2022

Anthony Chan Wai Hin (Chinese: 陳煒軒; born 19 January 2001) is a former Hong Kong professional footballer who played as a defender.

== Career statistics ==
=== Club ===
Appearances and goals by club, season and competition
Club	Season	League			Cup		League Cup		Total	
Club	Season	Division	Apps	Goals	Apps	Goals	Apps	Goals	Apps	Goals
HKFC	2021–22	Premier League	0	0	0	0	1 (Note: Appearances in the Sapling Cup)	0	1	0
Career total			7	2	0	0	1	0	8	2
