= Matt Orr =

Hong Kong footballer (born 1997)

- Orr in 2025

Personal information
- Full name: Matthew Elliot Wing Kai Chin Orr
- Date of birth: 1 January 1997 (age 29)
- Place of birth: Sai Ying Pun, British Hong Kong
- Height: 1.88 m (6 ft 2 in)
- Position: Forward

Team information
- Current team: Shanghai Port
- Number: 14

Youth career
- 2007–2013: Kitchee
- 2013–2016: IMG Academy

College career
Years	Team	Apps	(Gls)
2016–2018	San Francisco Dons	41	(4)
2019	Syracuse Orange	16	(0)

Senior career*
Years	Team	Apps	(Gls)
2020–2022	Kitchee	24	(4)
2022–2023	Guangxi Pingguo Haliao	41	(18)
2024–2025	Shenzhen Peng City	44	(5)
2026–	Shanghai Port	6	(1)

International career^{‡}
2015	Hong Kong U19	4	(0)
2018–2019	Hong Kong U22	8	(1)
2021–	Hong Kong	51	(16)
Medal record
Men's football
Representing Hong Kong
FIFA ASEAN Challenge Cup
Winner	2026 Hong Kong
- * Club domestic league appearances and goals as of 8 November 2026 ‡ National team caps and goals as of 3 October 2026

Matthew Elliot Wing Kai Chin Orr (Chinese: 安永佳; born 1 January 1997) is a Hong Kong professional footballer who currently plays as a forward for China Super League club Shanghai Port and the Hong Kong national team.

== Club career ==
=== Early career ===
Orr joined Kitchee's academy at 11 years old. He enrolled into the IMG Academy three years later in order to further his football education, although he continued to return to Hong Kong every summer to train with Kitchee.

In 2016, Orr chose to play collegiately for San Francisco where he was named to the WCC All-Freshman team. In 2017, he was an integral part of the Dons team that won the West Coast Conference.

In January 2019, he transferred to Syracuse for his senior season.

=== Kitchee ===
On 3 July 2019, Kitchee announced an agreement for Orr to join in the second half of the season. On 27 December 2019, Orr returned to Hong Kong, signing a contract with his boyhood club Kitchee.

He made his professional debut on 11 February 2020 in a Sapling Cup match against Rangers. Matthew scored his first Hong Kong Premier League goal in a 2–2 draw against Lee Man on 22 November 2020.

On 20 August 2022, Orr departed Kitchee.

=== Guangxi Pingguo Haliao ===
After two years with Kitchee, Orr joined China League One club Guangxi Pingguo Haliao.

On 22 July 2023, Orr became the top scorer in the club's history with 14 goals when he scored a brace in a 2–0 victory against Jiangxi Lushan.

=== Shenzhen Peng City ===
On 27 February 2024, Orr joined Chinese Super League club Shenzhen Peng City.

On 14 April 2024, Orr scored his first goal for Shenzhen Peng City in a draw against Wuhan Three Towns.

=== Shanghai Port ===
On 19 January 2026, Orr joined another CSL club Shanghai Port.

== International career ==
Orr first represented Hong Kong as a 12-year-old with the U13 team. He received his first call up to the U23 squad for the Asian Games.

In 2019, Orr was named to the Hong Kong squad for the 2019 Guangdong–Hong Kong Cup, where he scored a goal in the second leg but was later sent off for violent conduct.

In 2020, Orr was named to the U23 squad that participated in the AFC U-23 Championship Qualifiers held in Ulaanbaatar, Mongolia. Orr started all three games notching an assist.

After an impressive performance during the 2020–21 season of the HKPL, Orr was named in the 25-man squad for the 2022 World Cup qualifying fixtures against Iran, Iraq and Bahrain. He made his international debut against Iran on 3 June 2021, where he also scored his first international goal.

Orr was chosen as one of the over-aged players for the upcoming 2022 Asian Games to be held in Hangzhou, China from 19 September to 17 October 2023. On 27 September, Orr scored the winning goal against Palestine during the Round of 16, in which Hong Kong advanced into the Quarter-Finals for the first time since 1958.

On 26 December 2023, Orr was named in Hong Kong's squad for the 2023 AFC Asian Cup.

== Personal life ==
Orr was born and raised in Hong Kong by a New Zealand father, Andrew Orr, and a Chinese mother, Janice Chin. He is a graduate of Canadian International School. He also holds a New Zealand passport.

== Career statistics ==
=== Club ===
As of match played 18 February 2026

Appearances and goals by club, season and competition
Club	Season	League			National Cup		Other Cups		Continental		Other		Total	
Club	Season	Division	Apps	Goals	Apps	Goals	Apps	Goals	Apps	Goals	Apps	Goals	Apps	Goals
Kitchee	2019–20	Hong Kong Premier League	3	0	0	0	2 (Note: Appearances in the Sapling Cup)	1	0	0	0	0	5	1
Kitchee	2020–21	Hong Kong Premier League	17	3	0	0	7	8	6 (Note: Appearances in the AFC Champions League)	1	0	0	30	12
Kitchee	2021–22	Hong Kong Premier League	4	1	1	0	7	2	4	0	0	0	16	3
Kitchee	Total		24	4	1	0	16	11	10	1	0	0	51	16
Guangxi Pingguo Haliao	2022	China League One	15	3	1	0	—		—		—		16	3
Guangxi Pingguo Haliao	2023	China League One	26	15	0	0	—		—		—		26	15
Guangxi Pingguo Haliao	Total		41	18	1	0	—		—		—		42	18
Shenzhen Peng City	2024	Chinese Super League	21	3	2	0	—		—		—		23	3
Shenzhen Peng City	2025	Chinese Super League	23	2	0	0	—		—		—		23	2
Shenzhen Peng City	Total		44	5	2	0	—		—		—		46	5
Shanghai Port	2026	Chinese Super League	0	0	0	0	—		2 (Note: Appearances in the AFC Champions League Elite)	0	—		2	0
Shanghai Port	Career total		109	27	4	0	16	11	12	1	0	0	141	39

=== International ===
As of 3 October 2026

National team	Year	Apps	Goals
Hong Kong	2021	3	1
Hong Kong	2022	7	2
Hong Kong	2023	8	0
Hong Kong	2024	17	6
Hong Kong	2025	11	4
Hong Kong	2026	5	3
Total		51	16

List of international goals scored by Matt Orr
No.	Date	Cap	Venue	Opponent	Score	Result	Competition
1.	3 June 2021	1	Al Muharraq Stadium, Arad, Bahrain	Iran	1–3	1–3	2022 FIFA World Cup qualification
2.	8 June 2022	5	Salt Lake Stadium, Kolkata, India	Afghanistan	2–0	2–1	2023 AFC Asian Cup qualification
3.	11 June 2022	6	Salt Lake Stadium, Kolkata, India	Cambodia	1–0	3–0	2023 AFC Asian Cup qualification
4.	5 September 2024	27	HFC Bank Stadium, Suva, Fiji	Solomon Islands	2–0	3–0	Friendly
5.	8 September 2024	28	Churchill Park, Lautoka, Fiji	Fiji	1–1	1–1	
6.	15 October 2024	30	Hong Kong Stadium, So Kon Po, Hong Kong	Cambodia	1–0	3–0	
7.	14 November 2024	31	Hong Kong Stadium, So Kon Po, Hong Kong	Philippines	1–0	3–1	
8.	14 November 2024	31	Hong Kong Stadium, So Kon Po, Hong Kong	Philippines	3–1	3–1	
9.	14 December 2024	34	Mong Kok Stadium, Mong Kok, Hong Kong	Chinese Taipei	1–0	2–1	2025 EAFF E-1 Football Championship – preliminary round
10.	8 July 2025	38	Yongin Mireu Stadium, Yongin, South Korea	Japan	1–5	1–6	2025 EAFF E-1 Football Championship
11.	4 September 2025	41	Kanchanaburi Province Stadium, Kanchanaburi, Thailand	Iraq	1–0	1–2	2025 King's Cup
12.	14 October 2025	44	Kai Tak Stadium, Kowloon, Hong Kong	Bangladesh	1–0	1–1	2027 AFC Asian Cup qualification
13.	18 November 2025	46	Kai Tak Stadium, Kowloon, Hong Kong	Singapore	1–0	1–2	2027 AFC Asian Cup qualification
14.	27 September 2026	49	Kai Tak Stadium, Kowloon, Hong Kong	Laos	4–0	4–0	2026 FIFA ASEAN Challenge Cup
15.	30 September 2026	50	Kai Tak Stadium, Kowloon, Hong Kong	Brunei	2–0	2–0	2026 FIFA ASEAN Challenge Cup
16.	3 October 2026	51	Kai Tak Stadium, Kowloon, Hong Kong	Cambodia	1–0	2–0	2026 FIFA ASEAN Challenge Cup

== Honours ==
Kitchee

- Hong Kong Premier League: 2019–20, 2020–21
- Hong Kong Sapling Cup: 2019–20

Hong Kong

- Guangdong-Hong Kong Cup: 41st
- FIFA ASEAN Challenge Cup: 2026

Individual

- China League One Player of the Month: June 2023
- FIFA ASEAN Challenge Cup Top Scorer: 2026
