= Carles Tena =

Spanish footballer

Personal information
- Full name: Carles Tena Parra
- Date of birth: 15 October 1992 (age 34)
- Place of birth: Sant Boi de Llobregat, Spain
- Height: 1.80 m (5 ft 11 in)
- Position: Defensive midfielder

Senior career*
Years	Team	Apps	(Gls)
2012–2017	Santfeliuenc	39	(3)
2017–2018	Europa	18	(2)
2018–2019	Figueres	35	(4)
2019–2020	Santfeliuenc	15	(0)
2020–2023	Resources Capital	29	(2)
2024	North District	12	(0)
- * Club domestic league appearances and goals as of 5 July 2024

Carles Tena Parra (born 15 October 1992) is a Spanish professional footballer who plays as a defensive midfielder.

== Club career ==
In October 2020, Tena joined Resources Capital.

On 9 February 2024, Tena joined North District.

== Career statistics ==
=== Club ===
As of 24 January 2021.

Club	Season	League			National Cup		League Cup		Other		Total	
Club	Season	Division	Apps	Goals	Apps	Goals	Apps	Goals	Apps	Goals	Apps	Goals
Santfeliuenc	2014–15	Tercera División	20	0	0	0	–		0	0	20	0
Santfeliuenc	2015–16	Tercera División	6	1	0	0	–		0	0	6	1
Santfeliuenc	2016–17	Tercera División	13	2	0	0	–		0	0	13	2
Santfeliuenc	Total		39	3	0	0	0	0	0	0	39	3
Europa	2017–18	Tercera División	18	2	0	0	–		0	0	18	2
Figueres	2018–19	Tercera División	35	4	0	0	–		0	0	35	4
Santfeliuenc	2019–20	Tercera División	15	0	0	0	–		0	0	15	0
Resources Capital	2020–21	Hong Kong Premier League	4	1	0	0	5 (Note: Appearances in the Hong Kong Sapling Cup)	1	0	0	7	1
Career total			111	10	0	0	5	1	0	0	114	10
