= Cheng Tsz Sum =

Hong Kong association football player

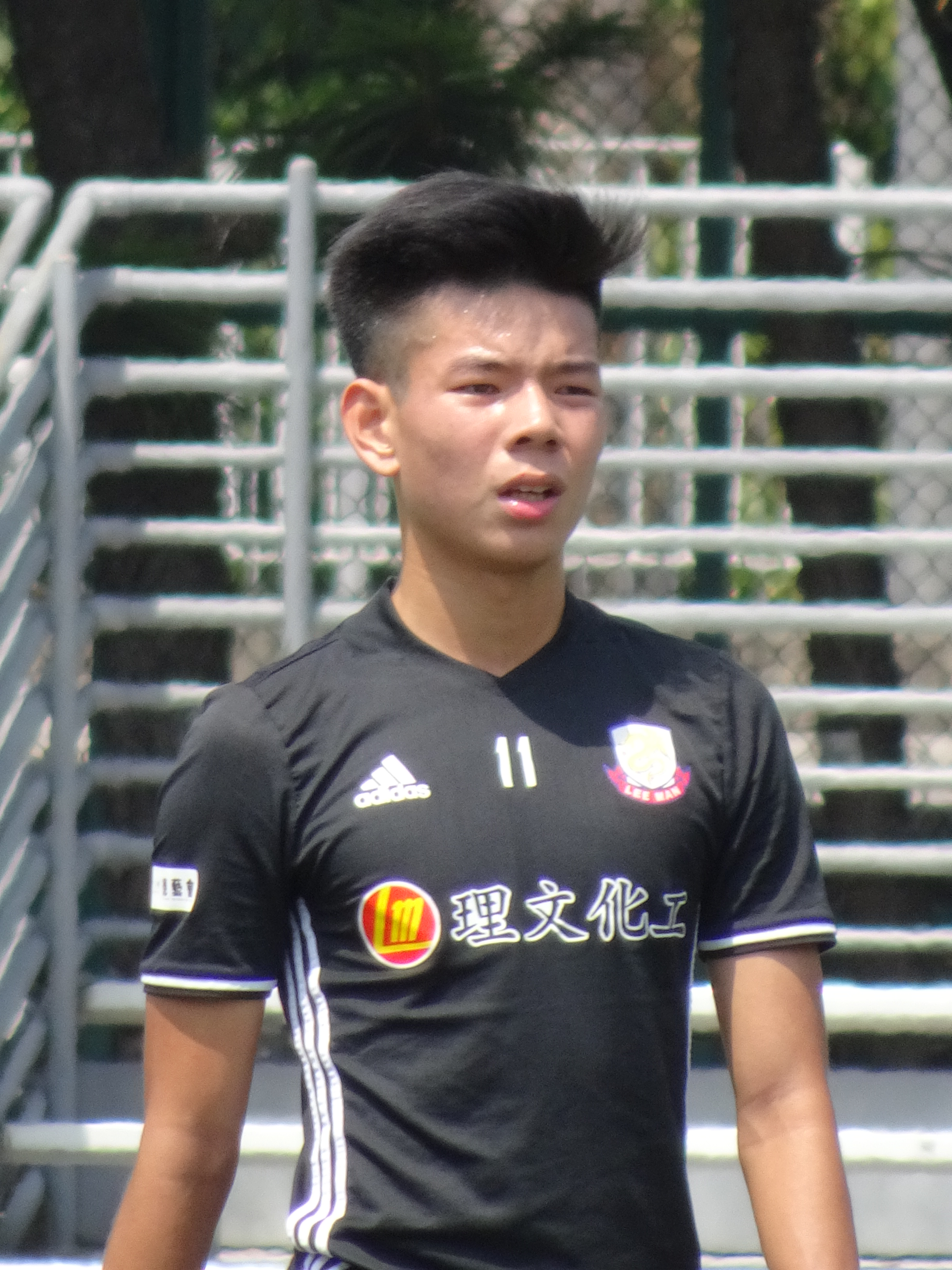

Personal information
- Full name: Cheng Tsz Sum
- Date of birth: 20 March 1999 (age 27)
- Place of birth: Hong Kong
- Height: 1.77 m (5 ft 10 in)
- Positions: Left back; left midfielder

Team information
- Current team: Southern
- Number: 99

Youth career
- 2012–2017: Kwai Tsing

Senior career*
| Years | Team | Apps | (Gls) |
| 2017 | Rangers (HKG) | 0 | (0) |
| 2017–2018 | Lee Man | 1 | (0) |
| 2018–2020 | Tai Po | 1 | (0) |
| 2020–2021 | Eastern | 2 | (0) |
| 2021–2022 | Rangers (HKG) | 1 | (0) |
| 2022–2026 | Tai Po | 41 | (1) |
| 2025–2026 | → Rangers (HKG) (loan) | 18 | (1) |
| 2026– | Southern | 7 | (0) |

International career^{‡}
| 2017 | Hong Kong U-19 | 1 | (0) |
| 2021 | Hong Kong U-22 | 2 | (0) |
- * Club domestic league appearances and goals as of 21 November 2026 ‡ National team caps and goals as of 23 October 2021

Cheng Tsz Sum (Chinese: 鄭子森; born 20 March 1999) is a Hong Kong professional footballer who plays as a left back or a left midfielder for Hong Kong Premier League club Southern.

== Club career ==
On 5 August 2017, Cheng was unveiled as part of Lee Man's inaugural squad.

On 31 July 2018, Cheng was named as one of Tai Po's summer signings.

On 1 July 2020, Eastern announced that Cheng would join the club.

On 6 September 2021, Cheng rejoined Rangers.

On 8 August 2022, Cheng returned to Tai Po.

On 29 July 2025, Cheng joined Rangers on loan for the 2025–26 season.

On 16 June 2026, Cheng joined Southern.

== Honours ==
=== Club ===
Tai Po

- Hong Kong Premier League: 2018–19, 2024–25

=== International ===
Hong Kong

- Guangdong-Hong Kong Cup: 2019
