= Lau Kwan Ching =

Hong Kong footballer

Personal information
- Full name: Jeffrey Lau Kwan Ching
- Date of birth: 15 May 2002 (age 24)
- Place of birth: Hong Kong
- Height: 1.70 m (5 ft 7 in)
- Position: Midfielder

Team information
- Current team: Eastern
- Number: 15

Youth career
- 2013–2016: Pegasus
- 2016–2018: CFCSSHK
- 2018–2019: Resources Capital

Senior career*
| Years | Team | Apps | (Gls) |
| 2019–2023 | Resources Capital | 30 | (1) |
| 2023–2025 | North District | 36 | (0) |
| 2025– | Eastern | 29 | (0) |

International career^{‡}
| 2017 | Hong Kong U-16 | 5 | (0) |
| 2019 | Hong Kong U-19 | 2 | (0) |
| 2023 | Hong Kong U-22 | 6 | (0) |
- * Club domestic league appearances and goals as of 22 November 2026 ‡ National team caps and goals as of 24 March 2023

Jeffrey Lau Kwan Ching (Chinese: 劉君正; born 15 May 2002) is a Hong Kong professional footballer who currently plays as a midfielder for Hong Kong Premier League club Eastern.

== Club career ==
In August 2019, Lau was promoted to the first team of Resources Capital.

On 11 August 2023, Lau joined North District.

On 19 July 2025, Lau joined Eastern.
