= Hong Kong Reserve League =

Association football league in Hong Kong

- Founded: 1956
- Folded: 2023
- Country: Hong Kong
- Confederation: AFC
- Number of clubs: 10
- Last champions: Kitchee (2022–23)
- Most championships: Happy Valley (10 titles)
- Website: HKFA website

Hong Kong Reserve League (Chinese: 香港預備組聯賽) was the reserve team league formed by the clubs of Hong Kong Premier League under the organisation of the Hong Kong Football Association.

== Competition format ==
- Each team plays every other team in the league twice, one home and one away game.
- During every match, each team shall have at least six U-20 players on the pitch at any time.
- Since most of the teams do not have a home ground, the matches will be played on different grounds.
- There are no promotion and relegation in the league.

== See also ==
- Hong Kong Premier League
- The Hong Kong Football Association
