= Yuen Chun Sing =

Hong Kong footballer

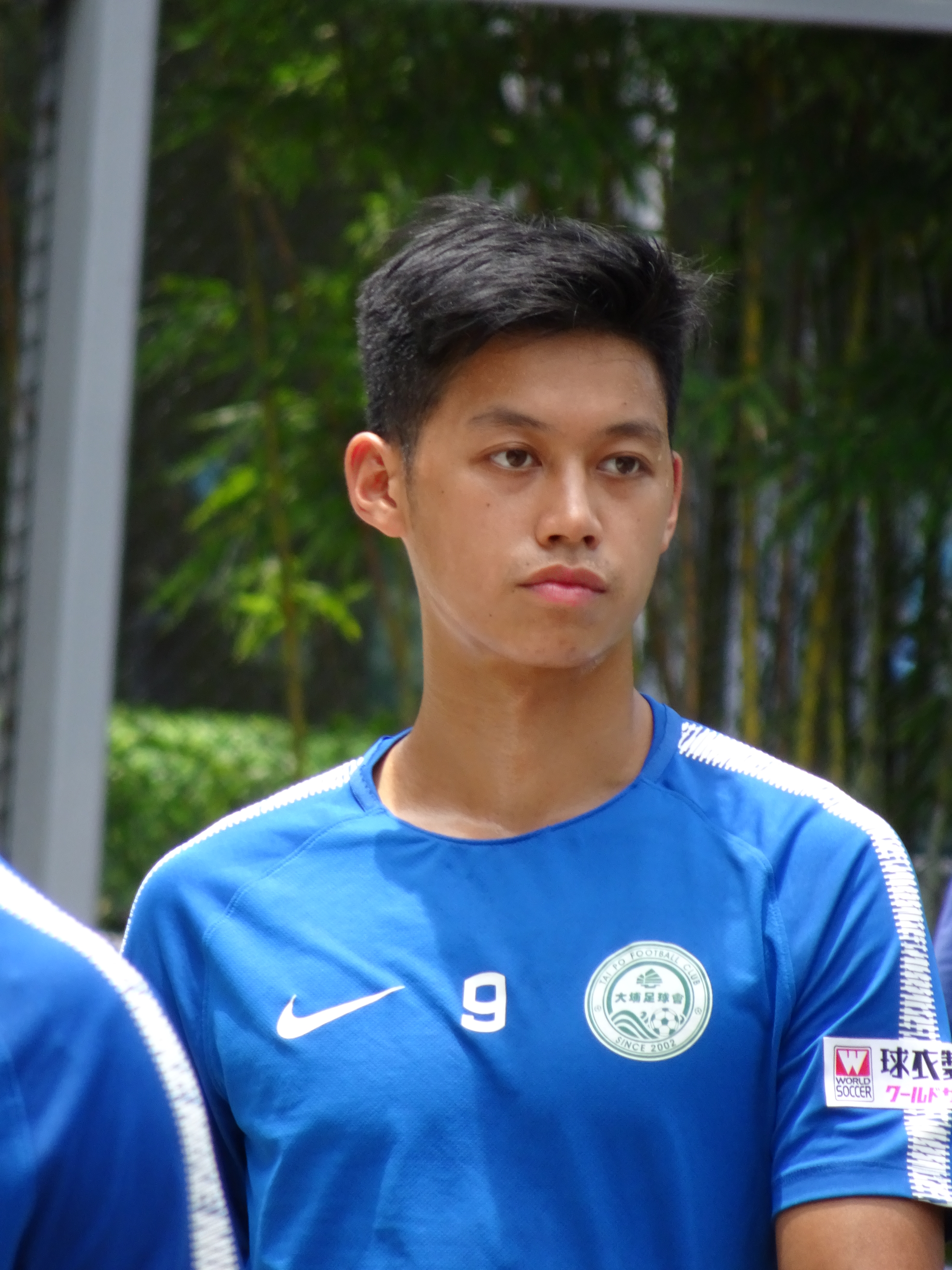

Personal information
- Full name: Jason Yuen Chun Sing
- Date of birth: 16 February 1993 (age 33)
- Place of birth: Hong Kong
- Height: 1.83 m (6 ft 0 in)
- Position: Striker

Youth career
- 2002–2004: Tai Po
- 2004–2008: Sun Hei

Senior career*
Years	Team	Apps	(Gls)
2015–2017	Sun Hei	50	(62)
2017–2018	Tai Po	13	(2)
2018–2020	R&F	10	(1)
2019	→ Pegasus (loan)	7	(2)
- * Club domestic league appearances and goals as of 14 October 2020

Jason Yuen Chun Sing (Chinese: 袁振昇; Jyutping: jyun^{4} zan^{3} sing^{1}; born 16 February 1993) is a former Hong Kong professional footballer who played as a striker.

== Early life ==
Born in Hong Kong, Yuen was discovered by then Tai Po youth coach Lee Chi Kin. Along with Leung Kwun Chung, Lam Hok Hei and Fong Pak Lun, the four were stand out players on the North District club's youth teams. At 11 years old, Yuen was selected to the Hong Kong Schools Sports Federation football team and led the team to the tournament championship. His performances led to an invitation to train at Sun Hei's youth academy. He accepted the invitation and trained there until he left while attending Diocesan Boys' School. After Form 2, he left Hong Kong to attend boarding school in the United Kingdom. Jason grew up in Rainham, Kent and went to the Howard School in Rainham.

== Club career ==
=== Sun Hei ===
Upon graduating from Kingston University in 2015, Yuen returned to Hong Kong with plans to be a banker full-time and a footballer in his spare time.

On 23 January 2016, Yuen scored the winner in the 2–1 victory over Tai Po and helped his team to capture the HKFA Cup Junior Division. On 17 April 2016, he scored the lone goal as part of the Hong Kong Select XI squad which lost 7–1 in the final of an exhibition showcase to a Central European XI managed by Andriy Shevchenko.

In December 2016, Yuen went on trial with Pegasus who were in need of attacking reinforcements. In the end, the two sides did not reach an agreement on a contract.

Yuen finished the 2016-17 season as the First Division's top scorer with 40 goals in 24 appearances.

=== Tai Po ===
On 3 May 2017, Yuen reached an agreement with Hong Kong Premier League club Tai Po. During an interview with Oriental Daily, Yuen's former youth coach Lee Chi Kin revealed that Yuen had been training with Tai Po since he had returned from the UK.

On 9 September 2017, Yuen scored his first goal for Tai Po in a 3–1 victory over Eastern.

=== R&F ===
After one season with Tai Po, Yuen moved to fellow HKPL side R&F. On 14 October 2020, Yuen left the club after his club's withdrawal from the HKPL in the new season.

=== Pegasus ===
After spending half season in R&F, he was loaned to Pegasus on 21 January 2019.

== Honours ==
=== Club ===
Sun Hei

- HKFA Cup Junior Division: 2016–17

=== Individual ===
- Hong Kong First Division Top Scorer: 2016–17
