= Chung Sing Lam =

Hong Kong footballer

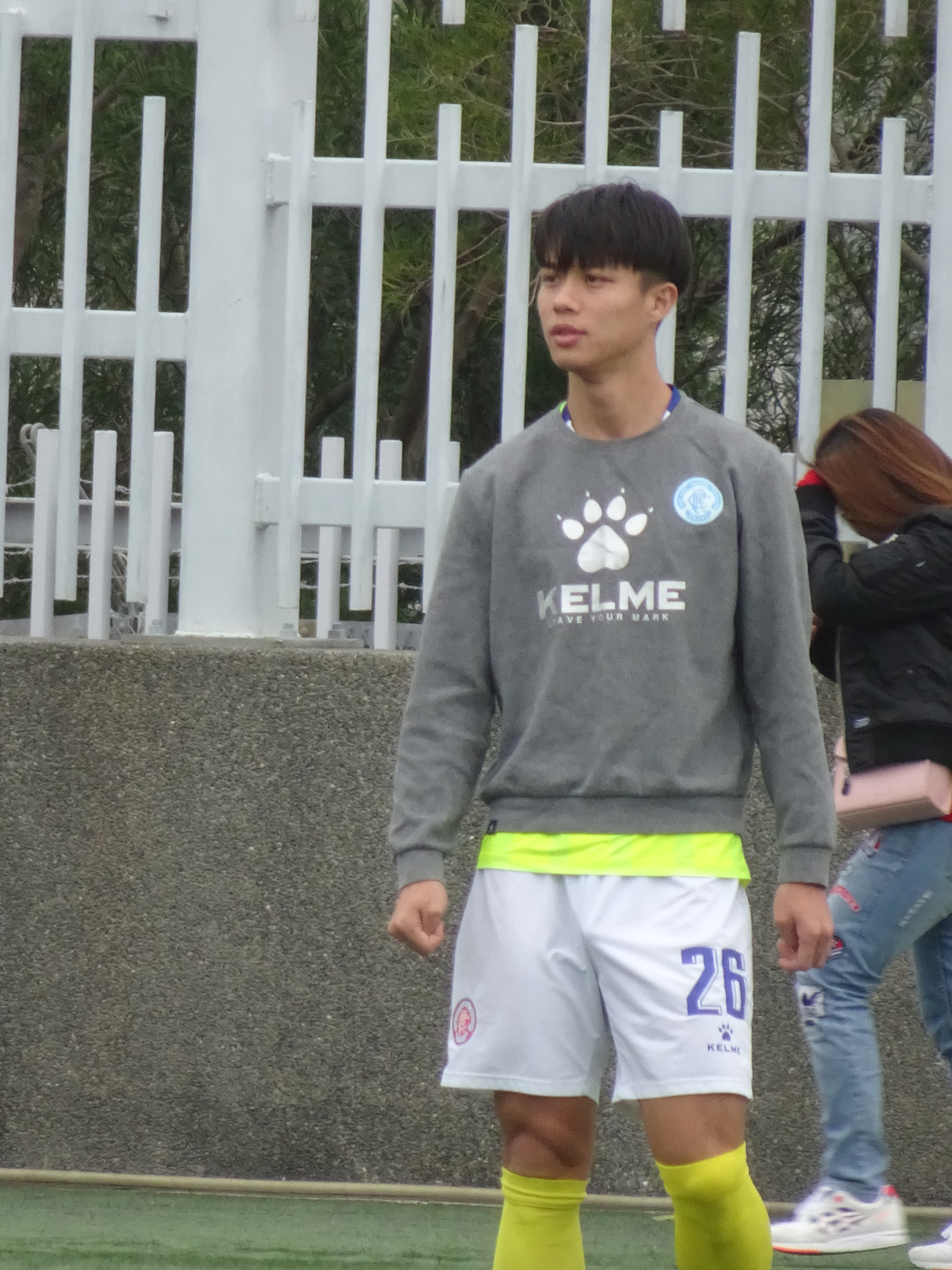

Personal information
- Full name: Chung Sing Lam
- Date of birth: 14 August 1998 (age 28)
- Place of birth: Hong Kong
- Height: 1.83 m (6 ft 0 in)
- Position: Centre back

Youth career
- Guangzhou Evergrande
- 2015–2016: Hong Kong Rangers

Senior career*
Years	Team	Apps	(Gls)
2016–2017	Biu Chun Glory Sky	1	(0)
2017–2021	Hong Kong Rangers	55	(2)
2022–2024	Lun Lok		
2024–2025	Mutual	9	(1)
2025	Lun Lok		
2025	Mutual		
2025–	Ornament		
- * Club domestic league appearances and goals as of 5 April 2022 ‡ National team caps and goals as of 13 June 2019

Chung Sing Lam (Chinese: 鍾昇霖; born 14 August 1998) is a former Hong Kong professional footballer who played as a centre back.

== Honours ==
=== International ===
Hong Kong

- Guangdong-Hong Kong Cup: 2019
