= Yuen Sai Kit =

Hong Kong footballer

Personal information
- Full name: Yuen Sai Kit
- Date of birth: 19 December 1999 (age 26)
- Place of birth: Hong Kong
- Height: 1.69 m (5 ft 7 in)
- Position: Forward

Team information
- Current team: North District
- Number: 7

Youth career
- 2014–2016: South China

Senior career*
Years	Team	Apps	(Gls)
2016–2021	Happy Valley	61	(10)
2018	→ Tung Sing (loan)	15	(3)
2021–2023	HK U23	19	(1)
2023–2024	Resources Capital	7	(1)
2024–2025	Kowloon City	7	(0)
2025–	North District	10	(0)

International career^{‡}
2014–2015	Hong Kong U-16		
2017	Hong Kong U-19	1	(0)
2021	Hong Kong U-22	1	(0)
- * Club domestic league appearances and goals as of 18 October 2026 ‡ National team caps and goals as of 28 October 2021

Yuen Sai Kit (Chinese: 袁世傑; born 19 December 1999) is a Hong Kong professional footballer who currently plays as a forward for Hong Kong Premier League club North District.

== Club career ==
On 3 August 2023, Yuen joined Resources Capital.

On 27 September 2024, Yuen joined Kowloon City.

On 24 July 2025, Yuen joined North District.
