= Oleksii Shliakotin =

Ukrainian-born Hong Kong footballer (born 1989)

Oleksii Shliakotin 奧利斯
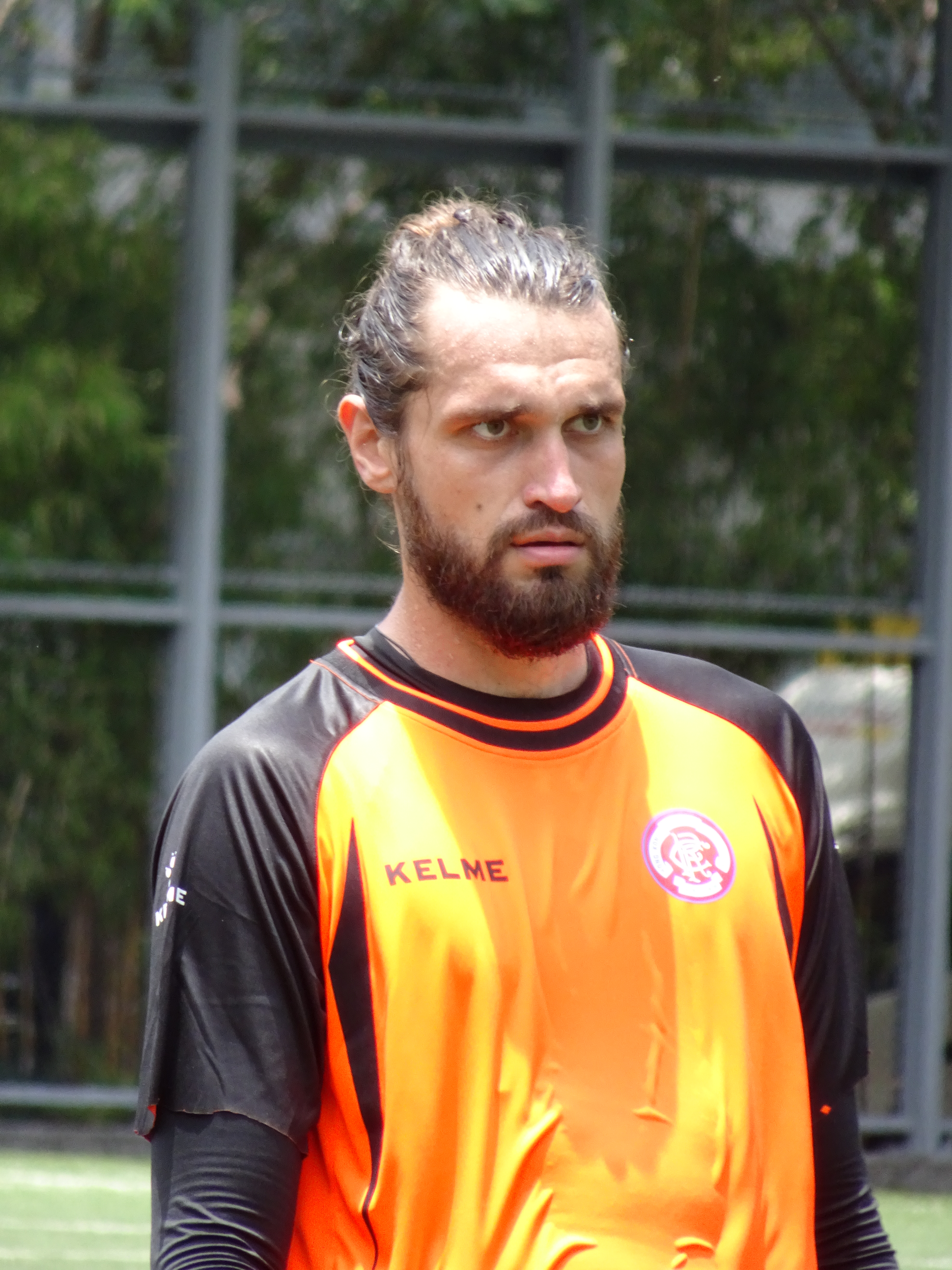
- Shliakotin with Rangers in 2017

Personal information
- Full name: Oleksii Ihorovych Shliakotin
- Date of birth: 2 September 1989 (age 37)
- Place of birth: Kyiv, Ukrainian SSR
- Height: 1.99 m (6 ft 6 in)
- Position: Goalkeeper

Youth career
- 1997–2007: Dynamo Kyiv

Senior career*
| Years | Team | Apps | (Gls) |
| 2006–2008 | Dynamo Kyiv | 0 | (0) |
| 2008–2009 | Czarni Żagań | 8 | (0) |
| 2009–2010 | Chornomorets-2 Odesa | 7 | (0) |
| 2010–2011 | Zagłębie Sosnowiec | 31 | (0) |
| 2012–2014 | Korona Kielce | 9 | (0) |
| 2013–2014 | Korona Kielce II | 9 | (0) |
| 2015 | União da Madeira | 0 | (0) |
| 2016–2017 | Biu Chun Glory Sky | 8 | (0) |
| 2017–2018 | Rangers (HKG) | 4 | (0) |
| 2020–2022 | Rangers (HKG) | 11 | (0) |
| 2022–2024 | Sham Shui Po | 13 | (0) |
| 2024 | → Rangers (HKG) (loan) | 4 | (0) |
| 2024–2025 | Rangers (HKG) | 8 | (0) |
| 2025–2026 | HKFC | 10 | (0) |

International career
| 2005–2006 | Ukraine U17 | 3 | (0) |
- * Club domestic league appearances and goals as of 16 May 2026

Oleksii Ihorovych Shliakotin (Ukrainian: Олексій Ігорович Шлякотін; Chinese: 奧利斯; born 2 September 1989) is a former professional footballer who plays as a goalkeeper. Born in Ukraine, he acquired his HKSAR passport in May 2025.

== Club career ==
Born in Kyiv, Ukraine, Shliakotin is a graduate of the Dynamo Kyiv football academy of Valeriy Lobanovskyi, where he was enrolled in 1997, aged 8, by Oleksandr Lysenko, and played at its various levels. By doing so, he left his family home when was eleven. In 2005, he was called up to Ukraine national under-17 team. In 2006, he signed his first professional contract with the second division team Dynamo-3 Kyiv.

In July 2010, Shliakotin moved to Poland, where he played for the next five years. In January 2011, he received an offer from MŠK Žilina, champions of Slovakia, but transfer never materialised.

In January 2012, Shliakotin was brought to the attention of Leszek Ojrzyński, and subsequently signed for Korona Kielce, where he has worked with Maciej Szczęsny.

In early July 2015, Shliakotin signed a two-year deal with recently promoted C.F. União.

In 2016, he moved to Hong Kong to sign for Hong Kong Premier League club Biu Chun Glory Sky.

In May 2017, Shliakotin was nominated for "Goalkeeper of the Year", and "Player of The Year" in Hong Kong Premier League. Three of his saves were nominated for "Save of the Year" in Hong Kong Premier League.

On 2 August 2017, it was revealed that Rangers had signed Shliakotin.

On 22 October 2020, Rangers announced that Shliakotin would return to the club after two years away from the game.

On 4 October 2022, Shliakotin joined Sham Shui Po.

On 31 January 2024, Shliakotin was loaned to Rangers, before joining them on a permanent basis in July 2024.

On 14 November 2025, Shliakotin joined HKFC.

== International career ==
On 30 August 2023, having lived in Hong Kong for seven years, Shliakotin said he's open to playing for the national team and is eligible to apply for a Hong Kong passport.

On 9 May 2025, it was announced that Shliakotin had received his HKSAR passport, making him eligible to represent Hong Kong internationally.

== Personal life ==
Shliakotin is married to Panamanian restaurateur Elizabeth Caballero. He spoke out about the invasion in Ukraine, saying: "It’s definitely the worst feeling I’ve ever experienced in my life – definitely the hardest moments I’ve ever been through" and that his parents were living in Kyiv when the invasion took place. As a result, his parents and sister lost their house and took refuge in Germany, where they received "refugee status".

== Honours ==
Rangers

- Hong Kong Sapling Cup: 2023–24
