= Law Ho Yin =

Hong Kong footballer

Personal information
- Date of birth: 13 September 1998 (age 28)
- Place of birth: Hong Kong
- Height: 1.80 m (5 ft 11 in)
- Position: Midfielder

Youth career
- 2010–2013: Rangers
- 2013–2016: Pegasus

Senior career*
Years	Team	Apps	(Gls)
2016–2021	Resources Capital	88	(2)
2022–2023	North District	3	(0)
2024–2025	Resources Capital	12	(0)
2025–	Sui Tung	2	(0)
- * Club domestic league appearances and goals

Law Ho Yin (Chinese: 羅浩賢; born 13 September 1998) is a Hong Kong former professional footballer who played as a midfielder.

== Club career ==
In July 2016, Law started his career with Hong Kong Second Division club Resources Capital, helping them achieve promotion to the Hong Kong top flight.

In 2019, he was appointed captain of Resources Capital.

On 11 December 2021, Law announced his retirement from professional football.
