= Lam Chun Kit =

Hong Kong footballer

Personal information
- Full name: Lam Chun Kit
- Date of birth: 6 January 1998 (age 28)
- Place of birth: Hong Kong
- Height: 1.78 m (5 ft 10 in)
- Position: Goalkeeper

Youth career
- Wong Tai Sin

Senior career*
| Years | Team | Apps | (Gls) |
| 2015 | Double Flower | 6 | (0) |
| 2016–2023 | Resources Capital | 92 | (0) |
| 2023–2024 | North District | 14 | (0) |

International career^{‡}
| 2019 | Hong Kong U-22 | 3 | (0) |
- * Club domestic league appearances and goals as of 26 May 2024 ‡ National team caps and goals as of 26 March 2019

Lam Chun Kit (Chinese: 林駿杰; born 6 January 1998) is a Hong Kong professional footballer who plays as a goalkeeper.

== Club career ==
=== Resources Capital ===
In July 2016, Lam joined Hong Kong First Division club Resources Capital.

=== North District ===
On 8 August 2023, Lam joined North District.
