= Santfeliuenc FC =

Spanish association football club

Santfeliuenc
- Full name: Santfeliuenc Fútbol Club
- Nickname: Santfe
- Founded: 1907
- Ground: Nou Estadi Les Grases, Sant Feliu de Llobregat, Catalonia, Spain
- Capacity: 2,500
- Chairman: Albert Prieto Carretero
- Manager: Andrés González Fernández
- League: Primera Catalana – Group 3
- 2025–26: Lliga Elit, 16th of 16 (relegated)
- Website: www.santfefc.com
Home colours	Away colours

Santfeliuenc Fútbol Club is a Spanish football team based in Sant Feliu de Llobregat, Barcelona in the autonomous community of Catalonia. Founded in 1907, it plays in Primera Catalana – Group 3, holding home games at Nou Estadi Municipal de Les Grases.

== History ==
The club was founded on December 3, 1905.

== Season to season ==
Season	Tier	Division	Place	Copa del Rey
1939–40	7	2ª Reg.	5th	
1940–41	7	2ª Reg.	2nd	
1941–42	6	2ª Reg.		
1942–43	5	2ª Reg.	8th	
1943–44	DNP			
1944–45	DNP			
1945–46	6	2ª Reg. P.	6th	
1946–47	7	4ª Reg.	4th	
1947–48	6	2ª Reg.	2nd	
1948–49	6	2ª Reg.	11th	
1949–50	6	2ª Reg.	2nd	
1950–51	5	1ª Reg. B	14th	
1951–52	5	1ª Reg. B	7th	
1952–53	5	1ª Reg. B	15th	
1953–54	5	2ª Reg.	9th	
1954–55	5	2ª Reg.	6th	
1955–56	5	2ª Reg.	4th	
1956–57	5	2ª Reg.	3rd	
1957–58	4	1ª Reg.	10th	
1958–59	4	1ª Reg.	4th	

Season	Tier	Division	Place	Copa del Rey
1959–60	4	1ª Reg.	5th	
1960–61	4	1ª Reg.	11th	
1961–62	4	1ª Reg.	13th	
1962–63	4	1ª Reg.	8th	
1963–64	4	1ª Reg.	13th	
1964–65	4	1ª Reg.	20th	
1965–66	5	2ª Reg.	7th	
1966–67	5	2ª Reg.	6th	
1967–68	5	2ª Reg.	4th	
1968–69	6	1ª Reg.	12th	
1969–70	6	1ª Reg.	14th	
1970–71	5	1ª Reg.	15th	
1971–72	5	1ª Reg.	19th	
1972–73	6	2ª Reg.	7th	
1973–74	6	2ª Reg.	4th	
1974–75	6	2ª Reg.	9th	
1975–76	6	2ª Reg.	2nd	
1976–77	6	2ª Reg.	8th	
1977–78	7	2ª Reg.	2nd	
1978–79	6	1ª Reg.	6th	

Season	Tier	Division	Place	Copa del Rey
1979–80	6	1ª Reg.	14th	
1980–81	6	1ª Reg.	16th	
1981–82	6	1ª Reg.	2nd	
1982–83	6	1ª Reg.	11th	
1983–84	6	1ª Reg.	17th	
1984–85	6	1ª Reg.	1st	
1985–86	5	Reg. Pref.	8th	
1986–87	5	Reg. Pref.	10th	
1987–88	5	Reg. Pref.	9th	
1988–89	5	Reg. Pref.	18th	
1989–90	6	1ª Reg.	6th	
1990–91	6	1ª Reg.	3rd	
1991–92	6	Pref. Terr.	6th	
1992–93	6	Pref. Terr.	6th	
1993–94	6	Pref. Terr.	9th	
1994–95	6	Pref. Terr.	7th	
1995–96	6	Pref. Terr.	11th	
1996–97	6	Pref. Terr.	9th	
1997–98	6	Pref. Terr.	8th	
1998–99	6	Pref. Terr.	15th	

Season	Tier	Division	Place	Copa del Rey
1999–2000	7	1ª Terr.	4th	
2000–01	7	1ª Terr.	7th	
2001–02	7	1ª Terr.	7th	
2002–03	7	1ª Terr.	4th	
2003–04	7	1ª Terr.	3rd	
2004–05	7	1ª Terr.	4th	
2005–06	7	1ª Terr.	2nd	
2006–07	6	Pref. Terr.	14th	
2007–08	6	Pref. Terr.	11th	
2008–09	6	Pref. Terr.	3rd	
2009–10	6	Pref. Terr.	4th	
2010–11	5	1ª Cat.	18th	
2011–12	5	1ª Cat.	7th	
2012–13	5	1ª Cat.	2nd	
2013–14	4	3ª	9th	
2014–15	4	3ª	16th	
2015–16	4	3ª	16th	
2016–17	4	3ª	13th	
2017–18	4	3ª	15th	
2018–19	4	3ª	13th	

Season	Tier	Division	Place	Copa del Rey
2019–20	4	3ª	16th	
2020–21	4	3ª	8th / 6th	
2021–22	6	1ª Cat.	4th	
2022–23	6	1ª Cat.	7th	
2023–24	7	1ª Cat.	11th	
2024–25	7	1ª Cat.	2nd	
2025–26	6	Lliga Elit	16th	
2026–27	7	1ª Cat.		

- 8 seasons in Tercera División
