= Chan Ching Him =

Hong Kong footballer

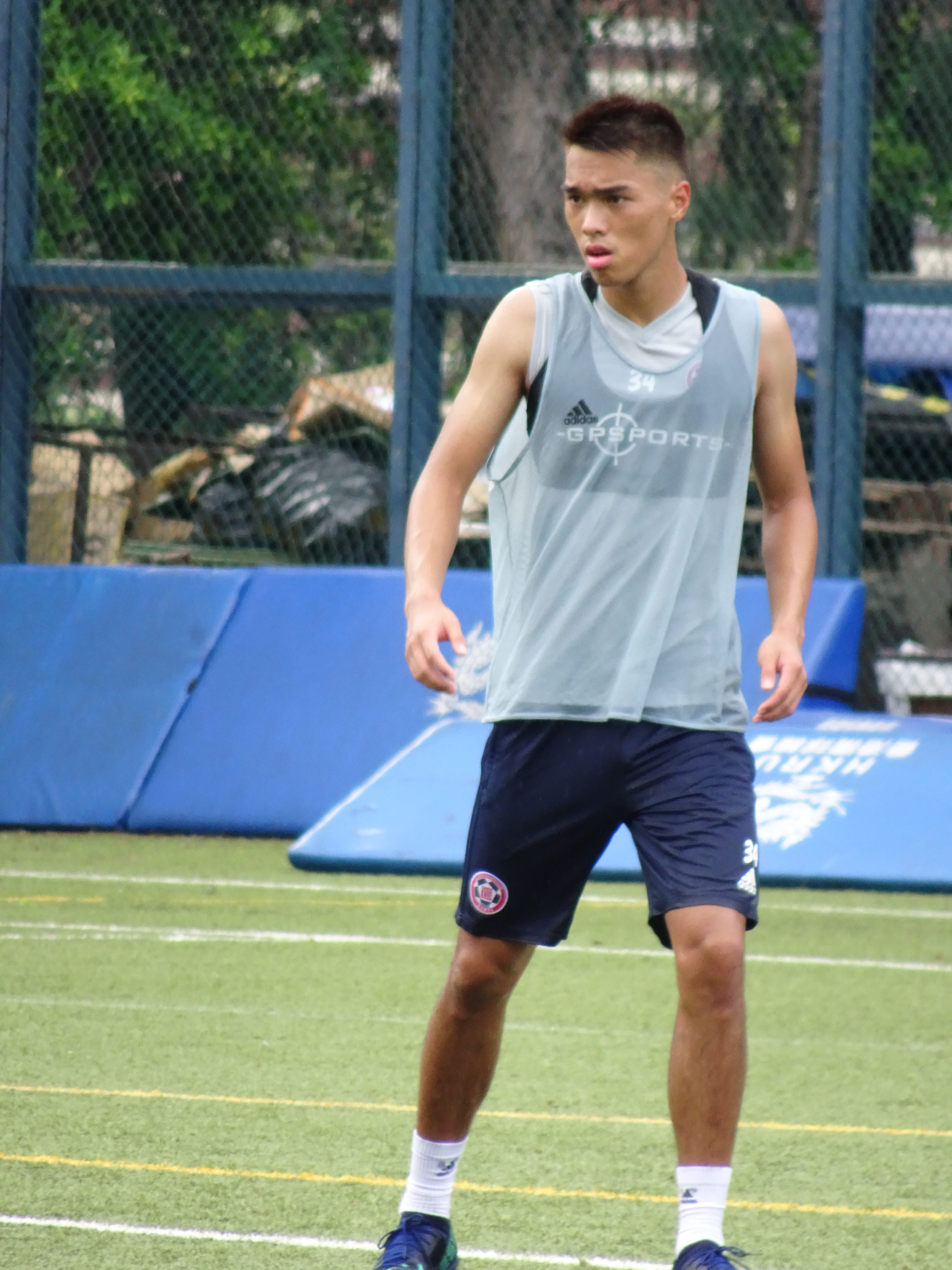

Personal information
- Full name: Matthew Chan Ching Him
- Date of birth: 18 April 1998 (age 28)
- Place of birth: Sha Tin, Hong Kong
- Height: 1.83 m (6 ft 0 in)
- Position: Centre back

Team information
- Current team: South China
- Number: 18

Youth career
- 2011–2013: South China
- 2013–2014: Eastern
- 2014–2015: South China
- 2015–2016: Kitchee

Senior career*
Years	Team	Apps	(Gls)
2016–2017	Eastern	0	(0)
2017–2018	Southern	0	(0)
2018–2020	Eastern	0	(0)
2020–2021	Pegasus	4	(0)
2021–2022	HK U23	3	(0)
2022–2024	Sham Shui Po	18	(0)
2024–	South China	48	(3)
- * Club domestic league appearances and goals as of 20 October 2026

Matthew Chan Ching Him (Chinese: 陳靜謙; born 18 April 1998) is a Hong Kong former professional footballer who currently plays as a centre back for Hong Kong First Division League club South China.

== Club career ==
Chan made his professional debut for Southern on 3 December 2017 in a Sapling Cup match against Kitchee.

On 20 October 2020, Chan was named as one of 17 new players for Pegasus.

In August 2021, Chan joined HK U23.

On 8 August 2022, Chan joined Sham Shui Po.

On 28 August 2024, Chan joined South China.

== Honours ==
=== International ===
Hong Kong

- Guangdong-Hong Kong Cup: 2019
