= Hong Kong Premier League =

Men's association football league in Hong Kong

- Founded: 2014; 12 years ago
- Country: Hong Kong
- Confederation: AFC
- Number of clubs: 11
- Level on pyramid: 1
- Relegation to: Hong Kong First Division
- Domestic cup(s): Hong Kong FA Cup; Hong Kong Senior Challenge Shield; HKFA League Cup
- International cup: AFC Champions League Two
- Current champions: Kitchee (7th title) (2025–26)
- Most championships: Kitchee (7 titles)
- Broadcasters: on.cc RTHK
- Website: hkfa.com
- Current: 2026–27 Hong Kong Premier League

The Hong Kong Premier League (Chinese: 香港超級聯賽), officially known as the BOC Life Hong Kong Premier League (Chinese: 中銀人壽香港超級聯賽) for sponsorship reasons, is a professional football league in Hong Kong organised by the Football Association of Hong Kong. Its inaugural season began in September 2014, and it is the top division of the Hong Kong football league system.

== History ==
On 7 February 2013, the Hong Kong Football Association stated that the new Premier League would get under way in Autumn 2014, where it was suggested that the 2013–14 season would be a transition year. As a result, the 2013–14 Hong Kong First Division League was the last season of the First Division to be the top tier of football in the Hong Kong league system.

The clubs already in the top division initially reacted negatively to the perceived increased running costs of competing in a professional league, particularly one where some felt that there was little difference to the old First Division. Five clubs – Citizen, Southern, Sun Hei, Happy Valley and Tuen Mun all eventually decided against joining the new league, which led to fears that the HKFA's plan to start the league with a minimum of 8 teams would not be possible. In the end, however, through public funding and government support, two teams from the Hong Kong Second Division were able to meet the new league licence requirements and were promoted, making a total of 9 teams for the first season.

With the recent completion of 'Project Phoenix' which started in 2011, the league has seen some improvements with further amendments planned for the future. This includes a new five-year funding agreement, a new licensing scheme for league member clubs, prize money for all participating teams and new measures put in place against corruption and match-fixing.

Kitchee were crowned as champions of the inaugural season, after amassing a total of 36 points in the league with only 2 losses. Tai Po finished bottom of the league with only 7 points.

The following season, Eastern won the league with a game to spare, winning their first top flight championship in 20 years. They also created history, as they were the first team in the world to win a top flight men's title whilst being managed by a female coach. Wong Tai Sin were relegated after finishing last in the league.

In the 2016–17 season, Kitchee reclaimed the title on the final day of the season in a showdown with rivals Eastern, a game which they won 4–1. Eastern later won the End-of-Season playoffs and will therefore also compete along with Kitchee in the 2018 AFC Champions League. HKFC finished bottom of the table, and were thus automatically relegated to the First Division.

Kitchee successfully defended their title in the 2017–18 season, becoming the first club to repeat as champions the following year.

In the 2018–19 season, Tai Po won the league, becoming the first district team to win a top flight title since Yuen Long in 1962–63.

Due to the COVID-19 pandemic, the 2021–22 season was curtailed and ultimately cancelled, with the championship withheld: this was the first time a top flight league season had been cancelled since the Second World War.

Since 2022–23 season, the Premier League Committee was established. The committee focuses on promoting the Hong Kong Premier League in the market and seeking commercial sponsorships, and achieving box office revenue sharing.

In the 2023–24 season, the video assistant referee (VAR) review system was introduced. Lee Man won the league with a game to spare, winning their first ever top flight championship.

== Format ==
The first season kicked off in September 2014, with 9 teams competing for the championship. It was initially suggested that a relegation system would not apply for the first few seasons, and that teams would continue to be promoted to the top-tier league until there were 12 member clubs. In the end, however, the HKFA decided that one club would be relegated and one club would be promoted from the 2014–15 Hong Kong First Division League.

By 2016–17, the league had expanded to 11 teams. The HKFA promoted Tai Po and HKFC who had finished at the top of the 2015–16 Hong Kong First Division into the league while adding expansion teams Hong Kong Sapling and R&F. Wong Tai Sin were relegated from the previous season and Metro Gallery chose to self relegate due to financial difficulties.

For the 2017–18 season, the league moved down to ten teams after Hong Kong's most successful and longest running top flight club South China chose to relegate themselves to the First Division in a shock move after the departure of their chairman, and them failing to find suitable financial means to keep the club in the Premier League. HKFC were also relegated after finishing bottom of the table.

The current champions of the league and the champions of the Hong Kong FA Cup qualify for the group stage of the AFC Champions League Two. Previously the FA Cup winners and the teams finishing in 2nd, 3rd and 4th competed in an end of season playoff for the final spot in the AFC Champions League, but this format was abolished after the 2016–17 season.

== Reserve / U22 League ==
From 2014 to 2023, each Hong Kong Premier League team form their own reserve team which competes in the Hong Kong Reserve League.

Starting from the 2024–25 season, each Hong Kong Premier League team form their own U22 team which competes in the Hong Kong U22 League.

== Clubs ==
As of the 2026–27 season, a total of 11 teams currently participate in the Hong Kong Premier League.

2026–27 Club	2025–26 Position	Founded	Home stadium	First season	Total seasons	First season of current spell	No. of season of current spell	No. of titles	Most recent titles
Eastern	4th	1932	Mong Kok Stadium	2014–15	13	2014–15	13	1	2015–16
Eastern District	8th	2002	Siu Sai Wan Sports Ground	2025–26	2	2025–26	2	0	–
HKFC	10th	1886	HKFC Stadium	2016–17	7	2021–22	6	0	–
Kitchee	Champion	1931	Mong Kok Stadium; Tseung Kwan O Sports Ground	2014–15	13	2014–15	13	7	2025–26
Kowloon City	6th	2002	Sham Shui Po Sports Ground	2024–25	3	2024–25	3	0	–
Lee Man	3rd	2017	Mong Kok Stadium	2017–18	10	2017–18	10	1	2023–24
North District	5th	2002	North District Sports Ground	2023–24	4	2023–24	4	0	–
Rangers	9th	1958	Tsing Yi Sports Ground	2014–15	12	2019–20	8	0	–
Southern	7th	2002	Aberdeen Sports Ground	2015–16	12	2015–16	12	0	–
Sha Tin	9th in First Division	1982	Sha Tin Sports Ground	2026–27	1	2026–27	1	0	–
Tai Po	2nd	2002	Tai Po Sports Ground	2014–15	10	2022–23	5	2	2024–25

Defunct / Relegated teams
Team	Founded	First season	Last season	Total seasons	2026–27 season status
Wong Tai Sin	1979	2014–15	2015–16	2	First Division
YFCMD / Dreams Metro Gallery	2008	2014–15	2015–16	2	First Division
South China	1910	2014–15	2016–17	3	First Division
Biu Chun Glory Sky / Dreams FC	2011	2016–17	2018–19	3	Defunct
Hoi King	2015	2018–19	2018–19	1	First Division
R&F	2016	2016–17	2019–20	4	Defunct
Yuen Long	1958	2014–15	2019–20	6	First Division
Happy Valley	1950	2019–20	2020–21	2	Defunct
Pegasus	2008	2014–15	2020–21	7	Third Division
Resources Capital	1982	2020–21	2023–24	4	First Division
HK U23	2021	2021–22	2023–24	3	Defunct
Sham Shui Po	2002	2022–23	2023–24	2	First Division

=== Timeline ===
Current members Former members

=== Stadia and locations ===
Locations of the 2026–27 Hong Kong Premier League clubs

Eastern Lee Man	Eastern District	HKFC	Kitchee	Kowloon City	North District
Mong Kok Stadium	Siu Sai Wan Sports Ground	HKFC Stadium	Tseung Kwan O Sports Ground	Kai Tak Youth Sports Ground	North District Sports Ground
Capacity: 6,664	Capacity: 11,981	Capacity: 2,750	Capacity: 3,500	Capacity: 5,000	Capacity: 2,500
Rangers	Sha Tin			Southern	Tai Po
Tsing Yi Sports Ground	Hammer Hill Road Sports Ground	Sha Tin Sports Ground	Kai Tak Youth Sports Ground	Aberdeen Sports Ground	Tai Po Sports Ground
Capacity: 1,500	Capacity: 2,200	Capacity: 2,540	Capacity: 5,000	Capacity: 9,000	Capacity: 3,200

== Champions ==
No.	Season	Champion	Runner-ups	No. of teams	No. of rounds
1	2014–15	Kitchee	Eastern	9	18
2	2015–16	Eastern	Kitchee	9	18
3	2016–17	Kitchee	Eastern	11	22
4	2017–18	Kitchee	Tai Po	10	18
5	2018–19	Tai Po	R&F	10	18
6	2019–20	Kitchee	Eastern	10	18
7	2020–21	Kitchee	Eastern	8	17
8	2021–22	Abandoned due to COVID-19 pandemic in Hong Kong		8	17
9	2022–23	Kitchee	Lee Man	10	18
10	2023–24	Lee Man	Tai Po	11	22
11	2024–25	Tai Po	Lee Man	9	27
12	2025–26	Kitchee	Tai Po	10	23
12	2026–27			11	22

=== Titles by clubs ===
Club	Wins	Years
Kitchee	7	2014–15, 2016–17, 2017–18, 2019–20, 2020–21, 2022–23, 2025–26
Tai Po	2	2018–19, 2024–25
Eastern	1	2015–16
Lee Man	1	2023–24

== Attendance record ==
Season	No. of matches	Total	Average	Highest		Lowest	
2014–15	72	75,431	1,048	Kitchee 2–2 South China	3,523	Rangers 2–0 Yuen Long	209
2015–16	72	73,334	1,019	Eastern 3–1 South China	4,130	Rangers 5–0 Southern	271
2016–17	110	101,222	920	Eastern 1–4 Kitchee	6,413	R&F 5–3 Rangers	100
2017–18	90	86,074	956	Eastern 1–8 Kitchee	5,415	Rangers 1–1 Dreams FC	233
2018–19	90	84,265	936	Kitchee 1–1 Eastern	3,489	R&F 3–0 Hoi King	99
2019–20	60	34,903	793	Kitchee 5–0 Happy Valley	2,772	Rangers 1–7 R&F	240
2020–21	68	72,560	1,067	Kitchee 2–0 Eastern	7,802	Southern 4–1 Resources Capital	308
2021–22	15	13,498	900	Kitchee 1–0 Eastern	3,163	HK U23 2–2 HKFC	260
2022–23	90	67,454	749	Kitchee 2–2 Lee Man	6,489	HK U23 1–1 HKFC	135
2023–24	110	63,490	577	Kitchee 2–3 Lee Man	2,310	HKFC 5–0 Sham Shui Po	79
2024–25	108	74,011	685	Eastern 3–3 Tai Po	2,455	Rangers 3–1 North District	172
2025–26	110	81,774	743	Eastern 0–1 Kitchee	2,706	Rangers 5–2 HKFC	178

== Prize money ==
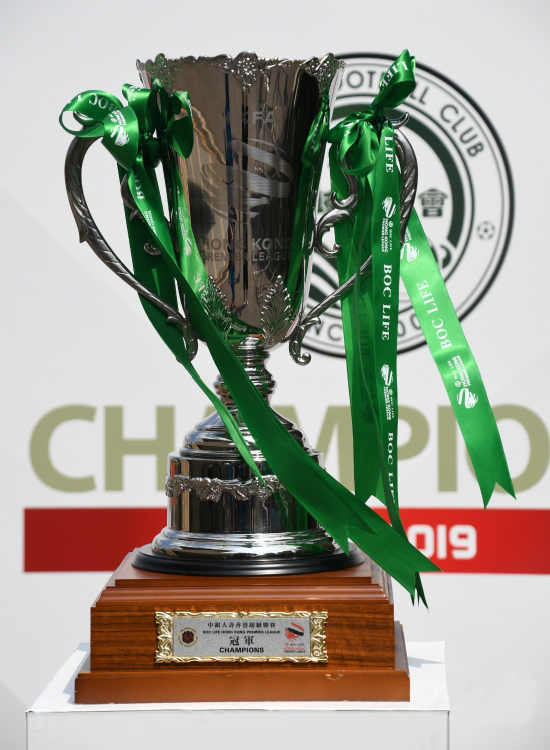
The Hong Kong Premier League trophy.

The money for the each placement of the table is as follows.

Final placing	Prize money (HK$)
Champions	720,000
Runners-up	325,000
Third	180,000
Fourth	125,000
Fifth	90,000
Sixth	60,000
Seventh	50,000
Eighth	40,000
Ninth	30,000
Tenth	20,000

== Media coverage ==
Live matches and highlights shows are provided through ontv and RTHK TV in Cantonese.

With regards to English coverage, the official HKFA website, and to a lesser extent the South China Morning Post, provide match reports, player interviews, club information and league data. The Hong Kong Football Podcast also covers the HKPL on a fortnightly basis.

== Other tournaments ==
=== Domestic tournaments ===
- FA Cup (1975–present)
- Senior Shield (1896–present)
- League Cup (2000–2009, 2010–2012, 2014–2016, 2025–present)
- U22 League (2024–present)
- Community Cup (2014–2018)
- Reserve League (1956–2023)
- Sapling Cup (2015–2025)

=== Continental tournaments ===
- AFC Champions League Two (2004–2016, 2019–2022, 2024–present)
- AFC Champions League Elite (2002–2003, 2014–2024)
