= 2017–18 Lee Man FC season =

Lee Man 2017–18
- President: Norman Lee
- Manager: (Hong Kong) Fung Ka Ki (to 9 April 2018) (Hong Kong) Fung Hoi Man (from 10 April 2018)
- Stadium: Tseung Kwan O Sports Ground
- Premier League: 8th
- Senior Shield: Quarter-finals
- FA Cup: Quarter-finals
- Sapling Cup: Group Stage
- Top goalscorer: League: Stefan (7); All: Stefan (14)
- Highest home attendance: 1,083 (vs Kitchee SC, 3 February 2018)
- Lowest home attendance: 240 (vs R&F, 13 May 2018)
- Average home league attendance: 509
Home colours	Away colours	Third colours

The 2017-18 season was the first season in Lee Man Football Club's existence, and their first year in Hong Kong Premier League, top flight football in Hong Kong, and also the FA Cup.

== Players ==
Squad No.	Name	Nationality	Date of birth (age)	Signed from	Signed in	Apps.	Goals
Goalkeepers
1	Ip Ka Yu	(Hong Kong)	24 December 1996 (age 21)	Lee Man Rangers	2017	1	0
19	Luk Felix	(Hong Kong)	17 May 1994 (age 23)	Lee Man Rangers	2017		0
20	Wong Tsz Chung	(Hong Kong)	16 June 1995 (age 22)	Hong Kong Pegasus FC	2017		0
25	Tai Ting Hong	(Hong Kong)	22 March 2003 (age 14)		2017	1	0
Defenders
5	Son Min-chol	(North Korea)	27 October 1986 (age 31)	Songkhla United	2017	19	0
22	Tse Long Hin	(Hong Kong)	6 February 1995 (age 22)	(on loan from Eastern Sports Club)	2017		1
23	Tse Fu Man	(Hong Kong)	12 February 1996 (age 21)		2017	0	0
24	Lee Kai Chi	(Hong Kong)	20 April 1998 (age 19)	Lee Man Rangers	2017		
26	Fok Pak Hin Felix	(Hong Kong)	18 March 1999 (age 18)		2017		
27	Yu Pui Hong	(Hong Kong)	7 February 1995 (age 22)	Dreams Sports Club	2017		
36	Marco Wegener	(Hong Kong)	15 August 1995 (age 22)	Lee Man Rangers	2017		
38	Chiu Chun Kit (c)	(Hong Kong)	4 October 1984 (age 33)	Lee Man Rangers	2017		
87	Luciano Silva da Silva	(Brazil)	13 June 1987 (age 30)	Yuen Long FC	2017		
Midfielders
6	Emmet Wan	(Hong Kong)	26 March 1992 (age 25)	(on loan from Kitchee SC)	2017		
11	Cheng Tsz Sum	(Hong Kong)	20 March 1999 (age 18)	Lee Man Rangers	2017		
12	Lai Yiu Cheong	(Hong Kong)	25 September 1988 (age 29)	Lee Man Rangers	2017		
15	Wong Chun Hin	(Hong Kong)	9 July 1995 (age 22)	(on loan from Eastern Sports Club)	2017		
16	Ngan Lok Fung	(Hong Kong)	26 January 1993 (age 24)	(on loan from Kitchee SC)	2017		
17	Chow Ka Lok Leo	(Hong Kong)	17 April 1999 (age 18)		2017		
21	Law Chun Yan	(Hong Kong)	21 June 1994 (age 23)		2017		
29	Matt Lam	(Canada)	10 September 1989 (age 28)	(on loan from Kitchee SC)	2018		
30	Zé Victor	(Brazil)	8 March 1990 (age 27)	Serra Macaense Futebol Clube	2017		
37	Chan Ming Kong	(Hong Kong)	1 July 1985 (age 32)	Lee Man Rangers	2017		
Forwards
7	Stefan (footballer)	(Brazil)	16 April 1988 (age 29)	Yuen Long FC	2017		
10	Man Ka Wing Daniel	(Hong Kong)	29 July 1994 (age 23)	Hong Kong FC	2017		
13	Hui Ka Lok	(Hong Kong)	5 January 1994 (age 23)	Lee Man Rangers	2017		
14	Denis Lima de Assis	(Brazil)	29 December 1989 (age 28)	Lee Man Rangers	2017		
18	Jordi Tarrés (footballer)	(Brazil)	16 March 1981 (age 36)	(on loan from Kitchee SC)	2017	7	1

== Loans ==
=== Loans in ===
Start date	End date	Position	No.	Player	From club	Ref
July 2017	30 June 2018	MF	6	(Hong Kong) Emmet Wan	(Hong Kong) Kitchee SC	
July 2017	30 June 2018	MF	15	(Hong Kong) Wong Chun Hin	(Hong Kong) Eastern Sports Club	
July 2017	30 June 2018	MF	16	(Hong Kong) Ngan Lok Fung	(Hong Kong) Kitchee SC	
July 2017	9 Jan 2018	FW	18	(Brazil) Jordi Tarrés	(Hong Kong) Kitchee SC	
July 2017	30 June 2018	DF	22	(Hong Kong) Tse Long Hin	(Hong Kong) Eastern Sports Club	
11 January 2018	30 June 2018	MF	29	(Canada) Matt Lam	(Hong Kong) Kitchee SC	

=== Loans out ===
Start date	End date	Position	No.	Player	To club	Ref.
24 January 2018	30 June 2018	MF	12	(Hong Kong) Lai Yiu Cheong	(Hong Kong) Yuen Long FC	

== Club officials ==
=== Club Coach Staff ===
Club Coach Staff
Position	Name
Head coach	(Hong Kong) Fung Ka Ki (to 9 April 2018)
Head coach	(Hong Kong) Fung Hoi Man (from 10 April 2018)
Assistant Coach	(Hong Kong) Fung Hoi Man
Assistant Coach	(Hong Kong) Lam Hing Lun
Goalkeeping Coach	(Hong Kong) Tong Ka Ming

== Competitions ==
Win Draw Loss

=== Hong Kong Premier League ===
==== Table ====
Pos	Team	Pld	W	D	L	GF	GA	GD	Pts
7	(China) R&F	18	7	1	10	27	35	−8	22
8	Lee Man	18	4	3	11	22	36	−14	15
9	Dreams FC	18	4	3	11	18	40	−22	15

Updated to match(es) played on 13 May 2018. Source: Hong Kong Football Association
Rules for classification: 1) Points; 2) Head-to-head points; 3) Head-to-head goal difference; 4) Head-to-head goals scored; 5) Goal difference; 6) Goals scored; 7) Fair-play points; 8) Drawing lots (Play-off if the winner has to be decided)

==== Results by round ====
Round	1	2	3	4	5	6	7	8	9	10	11	12	13	14	15	16	17	18
Ground	A	H	H	A	A	H	A	H	H	H	H	A	A	A	H	A	A	H
Result	L	W	D	L	L	L	D	W	W	W	L	L	L	L	L	L	D	L
Position	8	9	7	7	7	8	9	8	6	4	5	6	7	8	8	8	8	8

Updated to match(es) played on 13 May 2018. Source: Hong Kong Football Association website
A = Away; H = Home; W = Win; D = Draw; L = Loss

==== League Matches ====
10 September 2017 1	Sun Bus Yuen Long	1–0	Lee Man	Yuen Long
14:30 (UTC+8)	Carlos Augusto Bertoldi (yellow card) 71'; Yiu Ho Ming 74'	Report	Chan Ming Kong (yellow card) 32'; Chiu Chun Kit (yellow card) 89'; Victor (yellow card) 90+3'	Stadium: Yuen Long Stadium; Attendance: 1,287; Referee: Ho Wai Sing

15 September 2017 2	Lee Man	3–2	Eastern Long Lions	Tseung Kwan O
20:00 (UTC+8)	Jordi 17'; Law Chun Yan 45'; Chiu Chun Kit 52' (yellow card) 63'; Luk Felix (yellow card) 78'	Report	Saba (yellow card) 12'; Kokko 50', 56' (pen.); Lugo (yellow card) 68'; Ju Yingzhi (yellow card) 85'	Stadium: Tseung Kwan O Sports Ground; Attendance: 693; Referee: Liu Kwok Man

30 September 2017 3	Lee Man	2–2	Wo Foo Tai Po	Tseung Kwan O
14:30 (UTC+8)	Victor 8'; Chiu Chun Kit (yellow card) 31'; Wong Chun Hin 52'	Report	Sartori 32'; Dhiego 70'; Chan Hiu Fung (yellow card) 82'	Stadium: Tseung Kwan O Sports Ground; Attendance: 532; Referee: Ng Chiu Kok

3 November 2017 4	Kitchee	4–1	Lee Man	Mongkok
14:30 (UTC+8)	Andreas Lam 7'; Sandro 51', 57'; Akande 80'	Report	Ngan Lok Fung (yellow card) 73'; Lima 90+2'	Stadium: Mong Kok Stadium; Attendance: 1,129; Referee: Tam Ping Wun

18 November 2017 5	R&F	1–0	Lee Man	Guangzhou
14:30 (UTC+8)	Li Rui 87'	Report		Stadium: Yanzigang Stadium; Attendance: 821

25 November 2017 6	Lee Man	0–2	HK Pegasus	Tseung Kwan O
17:30 (UTC+8)		Report		Stadium: Tseung Kwan O Sports Ground; Attendance: 402

2 December 2017 7	BC Rangers	1–1	Lee Man	Sham Shui Po
14:30 (UTC+8)		Report	Stefan 27'	Stadium: Sham Shui Po Sports Ground; Attendance: 565

10 December 2017 8	Lee Man	3–1	Kwoon Chung Southern	Tseung Kwan O
17:30 (UTC+8)	Stefan 13', 19'; Lima 26'	Report	Lau Hok Ming 5'	Stadium: Tseung Kwan O Sports Ground; Attendance: 352

14 January 2018 9	Lee Man	1–0	Dreams FC	Tseung Kwan O
14:30 (UTC+8)	Lima 1'	Report		Stadium: Tseung Kwan O Sports Ground; Attendance: 497

21 January 2018 10	Lee Man	2–0	BC Rangers	Tseung Kwan O
17:30 (UTC+8)	Lima 63'; Law Chun Yan 90+3'	Report		Stadium: Tseung Kwan O Sports Ground; Attendance: 399

3 February 2018 11	Lee Man	1–5	Kitchee	Tseung Kwan O
17:30 (UTC+8)	Stefan 4'	Report		Stadium: Tseung Kwan O Sports Ground; Attendance: 1,083

25 February 2018 12	Tai Po	2–0	Lee Man	Tai Po
14:30 (UTC+8)	Igor Sartori 58', 63' (pen.)	Report		Stadium: Tai Po Sports Ground; Attendance: 676

2 March 2018 13	HK Pegasus	3–2	Lee Man	So Kon Po
20:00 (UTC+8)		Report	Stefan 12'; Yu Pui Hong 65'	Stadium: Hong Kong Stadium; Attendance: 531

10 March 2018 14	Kwoon Chung Southern	2–1	Lee Man	Aberdeen
14:30 (UTC+8)		Report	Matt Lam 10'	Stadium: Aberdeen Sports Ground; Attendance: 401; Referee: Chan Ming Siu

1 April 2018 15	Lee Man	0–1	Sun Bus Yuen Long	Tseung Kwan O
17:30 (UTC+8)		Report	Everton 73'	Stadium: Tseung Kwan O Sports Ground; Attendance: 344; Referee: Ng Chiu Kok

14 April 2018 16	Eastern	3–2	Lee Man	Mongkok
17:30 (UTC+8)		Report	Tse Long Hin 11' (yellow card) 76'; Ngan Lok Fung 16'	Stadium: Mong Kok Stadium; Attendance: 879; Referee: Lau Fong Hei

29 April 2018 17	Dreams FC	2–2	Lee Man	Tsing Yi
17:30 (UTC+8)		Report	Stefan 20', 24'	Stadium: Tsing Yi Sports Ground; Attendance: 544; Referee: Chan Ming Siu

13 May 2018 18	Lee Man	1–4	R&F	Tseung Kwan O
14:30 (UTC+8)	Wong Chun Hin 55'	Report		Stadium: Tseung Kwan O Sports Ground; Attendance: 240; Referee: Law Bik Chi

=== Hong Kong FA Cup ===
31 December 2017 First Round	Lee Man	3–1	Dreams FC	Tsing Yi, New Territories
14:30 (UTC+8)	Denis 39'; Zé Victor 41'; Stefan 57'	Report	Lali 18'; Galán (yellow card) 59' (yellow-red card)	Stadium: Tsing Yi Sports Ground; Attendance: 1,159; Referee: Ng Chiu Kok

8 April 2018 Quarter Final	Kitchee	4-3	Lee Man	Tseung Kwan O, New Territories
14:30 (UTC+8)	Diego Forlán 12'; Sandro 23'; Kim Dong-jin (yellow card) 59'; Jared Lum 60'; Cancela (yellow card) 84'; Sandro 84'; Guo Jianqiao (yellow card) 90'		Stefan 7' 90+1' (pen.); Ze Victor (yellow card) 45'; Tse Long Hin 55' (yellow card) 90+3'; Matthew Lam (yellow card) 82'	Stadium: Tseung Kwan O Sports Ground; Attendance: 724; Referee: Liu Kwok Man

=== Hong Kong Senior Challenge Shield ===
24 September 2017 First Round	R&F	1–2	Lee Man	Tsing Yi, New Territories
17:30 (UTC+8)	Tsang Kin Fong (yellow card) 38'; Deng Yan Lin (yellow card) 64'; Roberto Júnior 68'; Vasudeva Das (yellow card) 74'	Report	Victor 15'; Luciano 53'; Wong Chun Hin (yellow card) 86'	Stadium: Tsing Yi Sports Ground; Attendance: 346; Referee: Chan Ming Siu

22 October 2017 Quarter Final	Southern	2-0	Lee Man	Tseung Kwan O, New Territories
14:30 (UTC+8)	Marcos 2'; Spitz (yellow card) 19'; Wellingsson 27'		Son Min-chol (yellow card) 22'; Luk Felix (yellow card) 58'	Stadium: Tseung Kwan O Sports Ground; Attendance: 456; Referee: Lau Fong Hei

=== Hong Kong Sapling Cup ===
28 October 2017	Dreams FC	2–1	Lee Man	Tsing Yi, Hong Kong
17:30 UTC+8	Joaquín García 29'; Cheng Chin Lung 43'	Report	Stefan 78'	Stadium: Tsing Yi Sports Ground

16 December 2017	Lee Man	0–0	Eastern	Diamond Hill, Hong Kong
14:30 UTC+8		Report		Stadium: Hammer Hill Road Sports Ground

11 February 2018	Yuen Long	1–2	Lee Man	Diamond Hill, Hong Kong
14:30 UTC+8	Aleksandar Randelovic 21'	Report	Stefan 65'; Lima 90'	Stadium: Hammer Hill Road Sports Ground

18 March 2018	Lee Man	3–3	Tai Po	Tsing Yi, Hong Kong
17:30 UTC+8	Emmet Wan (yellow card) 43'; Stefan 48', 67' (pen.), 88'	Report	Chan Hiu Fung 7'; Emmet Wan 57' (OG); Lee Ka Yiu 59'; Cheung Chak Wai (yellow card) 69'; David Lazari (yellow card) 90+1'	Stadium: Tsing Yi Sports Ground; Attendance: 324; Referee: So Kai Man
