= 2017–18 Hong Kong Senior Shield =

Tournament details
- Country: Hong Kong
- Teams: 10

Final positions
- Champions: Yuen Long (2nd title)
- Runners-up: Eastern

Tournament statistics
- Matches played: 9
- Goals scored: 30 (3.33 per match)
- Attendance: 11,755 (1,306 per match)
- Top goal scorer(s): Everton Camargo (4 goals)

2017–18 Hong Kong Senior Shield was the 116th season of the Hong Kong Senior Shield. Ten teams entered this edition, with two games being played in the first round before the quarter-final stage. The competition was only open to teams that play in the 2017–18 Hong Kong Premier League.

The champions, Yuen Long, received HK$150,000 in prize money while the runners up, Eastern, received HK$50,000. The MVP of the final received a HK$10,000 bonus.

== Calendar ==
Stage	Round	Date
Knockout	First round	24 September 2017
Knockout	Quarter-final	21 – 22 October 2017
Knockout	Semi-final	24 – 25 December 2017
Knockout	Final	27 January 2018

Source: HKFA

== Bracket ==
First round
**Rangers (p)**	**1 (5)**
Dreams FC	1 (4)
(China) R&F	1
**Lee Man**	2

Quarter-finals
**Kitchee**	**5**
Rangers	0
Tai Po	2
**Yuen Long (a.e.t.)**	**4***
**Southern**	**2**
Lee Man	0
**Eastern**	3
Pegasus	1

Semi-finals
Kitchee	1
**Yuen Long (a.e.t.)**	**3***
Southern	0
**Eastern**	1

Final
**Yuen Long**	3
Eastern	0

Bold = winner
* = after extra time, ( ) = penalty shootout score

== Fixtures and results ==
=== First round ===
14 September 2017	**Rangers**	**1–1** (a.e.t.) (**5–4** p)	Dreams FC	Hammer Hill Road Sports Ground
14:30 UTC+8	Chuck Yiu Kwok 22'	Report	Joaquín 78'	Attendance: 418; Referee: Tong Kui Sum
	**Penalties**
	Krasić (penalty scored); Castaño (penalty scored); Miović (penalty scored); Chuck Yiu Kwok (penalty scored); Lai Lok Yin (penalty scored)		(penalty missed) Gallardo; (penalty scored) Ruiz; (penalty scored) Lai Hau Hei; (penalty scored) Joaquín; (penalty scored) Martínez

14 September 2017	R&F **(China)**	**1–2**	**Lee Man**	Tsing Yi Sports Ground
17:30 UTC+8	Roberto 68'	Report	Victor 15'; Luciano 53'	Attendance: 346; Referee: Chan Ming Siu

=== Quarter-finals ===
21 October 2017	**Kitchee**	**5–0**	Rangers	Tseung Kwan O Sports Ground
14:30 UTC+8	Sandro 16'; Lam Ka Wai 25'; Fernando 28'; Lucas 35'; Akande 92'	Report		Attendance: 603; Referee: Ng Chiu Kok

21 October 2017	Tai Po	**2–4** (a.e.t.)	**Yuen Long**	Mong Kok Stadium
17:30 UTC+8	Praes 34'; Sartori 86'	Report	Yiu Ho Ming 41'; Ranđelović 63' (pen.); Everton 92'; Ranđelović 116'	Attendance: 765; Referee: Tong Kui Sum

22 October 2017	**Southern**	**2–0**	Lee Man	Tseung Kwan O Sports Ground
14:30 UTC+8	Marcos 2'; Wellingsson 27'	Report		Attendance: 456; Referee: Lau Fong Hei

22 October 2017	**Eastern**	**3–1**	Pegasus	Mong Kok Stadium
17:30 UTC+8	Bleda 20', 52'; Kokko 87'	Report	Awal 90'	Attendance: 1,441; Referee: Ho Wai Sing

=== Semi-finals ===
24 December 2017	Kitchee	**1–3** (a.e.t.)	**Yuen Long**	Mong Kok Stadium
15:00 UTC+8	Sandro 36'	Report	Ip Chung Long 39'; Everton 95', 111'	Attendance: 1,732; Referee: Tam Ping Wun

25 December 2017	Southern	**0–1**	**Eastern**	Mong Kok Stadium
15:00 UTC+8		Report	Bleda 38'	Attendance: 2,283; Referee: Liu Kwok Man

=== Final ===
27 January 2018	**Yuen Long**	**3–0**	Eastern	Hong Kong Stadium
15:00 UTC+8	Everton 17'; Juninho 59'; Lau Ho Lam 82'	Report		Attendance: 3,711; Referee: Luk Kin Sun
