= 2017–18 Hong Kong Premier League =

Hong Kong Premier League
- Season: 2017–18
- Champions: Kitchee
- Relegated: Rangers
- AFC Champions League: Kitchee
- AFC Cup: Tai Po
- Matches: 90
- Goals: 302 (3.36 per match)
- Top goalscorer: (Brazil) Lucas Silva (Kitchee) (15 goals)
- Biggest home win: Kitchee 7–0 Dreams FC (10 September 2017); Kitchee 7–0 Rangers (28 January 2018)
- Biggest away win: Eastern 1–8 Kitchee (18 January 2018)
- Highest scoring: Eastern 1–8 Kitchee (18 January 2018)
- Longest winning run: 9 matches Kitchee
- Longest unbeaten run: 18 matches Kitchee
- Longest winless run: 14 matches Rangers
- Longest losing run: 9 matches Dreams FC
- Highest attendance: 5,415; Eastern 1–8 Kitchee (18 January 2018)
- Lowest attendance: 233; Rangers 1–1 Dreams FC (13 May 2018)
- Total attendance: 86,074
- Average attendance: 956

The 2017–18 Hong Kong Premier League (also known as BOC Life Hong Kong Premier League for sponsorship reasons) was the 4th season of the Hong Kong Premier League, the top division of Hong Kong football.

== Teams ==
A total of 10 teams will contest the league, including eight sides from the 2016–17 Hong Kong Premier League, one renamed team and one newly formed team.

=== Stadia and locations ===
Location of R&F.
Locations of the Hong Kong Premier League 2017-18 teams

Primary venues used in the Hong Kong Premier League:

Kitchee Eastern	Southern	Yuen Long
Mong Kok Stadium	Aberdeen Sports Ground	Yuen Long Stadium
Capacity: 6,664	Capacity: 4,000	Capacity: 5,000
Tai Po	Rangers	Pegasus
Tai Po Sports Ground	Sham Shui Po Sports Ground	Hong Kong Stadium
Capacity: 3,200	Capacity: 2,194	Capacity: 40,000
Dreams FC	(China) R&F	Lee Man
Tsing Yi Sports Ground	Yanzigang Stadium	Tseung Kwan O Sports Ground
Capacity: 1,500	Capacity: 1,000	Capacity: 3,500

Remarks:
^{1}The capacity of Aberdeen Sports Ground is artificially reduced from 9,000 to 4,000 as only the main stand is opened for football matches.
^{2}The capacity of Yanzigang Stadium is artificially reduced from 2,000 to 1,000.

=== Personnel and kits ===
Team	Chairman	Head coach	Captain	Kit manufacturer	Kit sponsor
Dreams FC	Leung Chi Kui	Leung Chi Wing	Chan Wai Ho	Kelme	chatspr
Eastern	Peter Leung	Lee Kin Wo	Yapp Hung Fai	Adidas	O2 Capsule
Pegasus	Canny Leung	Yeung Ching Kwong	Chan Siu Ki	Adidas	ZTE
Kitchee	Ken Ng	Chu Chi Kwong	Lo Kwan Yee	Nike	Jockey Club Kitchee Centre
Lee Man	Fung Ka Ki	Fung Hoi Man	Jordi Tarrés	Adidas	Lee & Man Chemical
Rangers	Philip Lee	Su Yang	Igor Miović	Kelme	Mitico
Southern	Chan Man Chun	Cheng Siu Chung	Lam Ho Kwan	Macron	ISUZU
Tai Po	Gary Choy	Lee Chi Kin	Wong Wai	Nike	Sun Mobile
Yuen Long	Wong Wai Shun	Tsang Chiu Tat	Fábio Lopes	Kelme	Sun Bus
(China) R&F	Huang Shenghua	Bito Wu	Roberto	Ucan	R&F Properties

=== Managerial changes ===
Team	Outgoing manager	Manner of departure	Date of vacancy	Position in table	Incoming manager	Date of appointment
Rangers	(Serbia) Dejan Antonić	Sacked	4 December 2017	10th	Gerard Ambassa Guy	4 October 2017
Eastern	Szeto Man Chun	Resigned	19 January 2018	5th	Lee Kin Wo	19 January 2018
Rangers	Gerard Ambassa Guy	Sacked	5 March 2018	10th	Fung Wing Sing	5 March 2018
(China) R&F	(Poland) Marek Zając	Sacked	12 March 2018	6th	(United States) Bito Wu	12 March 2018

=== Foreign players ===
The number of foreign players is restricted to six (including one Asian player) per team, with no more than four on pitch during matches. R&F must have at least eight Hong Kong players in the squad and is allowed to register a maximum of 3 foreigners for the season.

Club	Player 1	Player 2	Player 3	Player 4	Player 5	Asian Player	Former Player
Dreams FC	(Spain) Pablo Gallardo	(Spain) José Galán	(Spain) Joaquín García	(Spain) Nacho Martínez	(Spain) Arkaitz Ruiz	(South Korea) Yoon Dong-Hun	
Eastern	(Brazil) Bruno	(Brazil) Diego Eli	(Brazil) Michel Lugo	(Brazil) Vítor Saba	(Japan) Yusuke Igawa	(Spain) Manuel Bleda	(Finland) Aleksandr Kokko (South Korea) Jo Tae-keun
Pegasus	(Brazil) João Emir	(Bulgaria) Rosen Kolev	(Cameroon) Mahama Awal	(Serbia) Nikola Komazec		(Australia) Travis Major	(Spain) Alfonso Artabe (Serbia) Igor Nedeljković
Kitchee	(Brazil) Fernando	(Brazil) Lucas Silva	(Hungary) Krisztián Vadócz	(South Korea) Kim Dong-jin	(Uruguay) Diego Forlán	(South Korea) Kim Bong-jin	
Lee Man	(Brazil) Denis	(Brazil) Stefan	(Brazil) Luciano Silva	(Brazil) Zé Victor		(North Korea) Son Min-chol	
Rangers	(Brazil) Mauricio	(Serbia) Marko Krasić	(Serbia) Igor Miović	(Ukraine) Oleksii Shliakotin		(Japan) Shu Sasaki	(France) Walter Vaz
Southern	(Brazil) Elias	(Brazil) Wellingsson	(Spain) Diego Garrido	(Spain) Marcos Jiménez	(Spain) Carles Martínez	(Pakistan) Zesh Rehman	(Spain) Carlos Rodríguez
Tai Po	(Brazil) Dudu	(Brazil) David Lazari	(Brazil) Dhiego Martins	(Brazil) Eduardo Praes	(Brazil) Igor Sartori	(Japan) Yuto Nakamura	
Yuen Long	(Brazil) Everton Camargo	(Brazil) Juninho	(Brazil) Ticão	(Brazil) Tomas	(Serbia) Aleksandar Ranđelović		
(China) R&F	(Brazil) Bruninho	(Brazil) Giovane	(Brazil) Tiago Leonço	—N/a	—N/a	—N/a	(Serbia) Marko Perović

Club	HK Player 1	HK Player 2	HK Player 3	HK Player 4	HK Player 5	HK Player 6	HK Player 7	HK Player 8	HK Player 9	HK Player 10
(China) R&F	Vas Núñez	Roberto	Itaparica	Tsang Kin Fong	Chow Cheuk Fung	Godfred Karikari	Ng Man Hin	Hung Lau	Law King Hei	Wong Kai Yiu

== League table ==
Pos	Team	Pld	W	D	L	GF	GA	GD	Pts	Qualification or relegation
1	Kitchee (C)	18	16	2	0	67	12	+55	50	Qualification to 2019 AFC Champions League Preliminary Round 2 or 2019 AFC Cup Group stage
2	Tai Po	18	11	4	3	36	21	+15	37	Qualification to 2019 AFC Cup Play-off round
3	Pegasus	18	10	4	4	37	26	+11	34	
4	Eastern	18	9	1	8	34	25	+9	28	
5	Southern	18	8	2	8	28	27	+1	26	
6	Yuen Long	18	6	5	7	21	30	−9	23	
7	(China) R&F	18	7	1	10	27	35	−8	22	
8	Lee Man	18	4	3	11	22	36	−14	15	
9	Dreams FC	18	4	3	11	18	40	−22	15	
10	Rangers (R)	18	1	3	14	12	50	−38	6	Relegation to Hong Kong First Division

Updated to match(es) played on 13 May 2018. Source: Hong Kong Football Association
Rules for classification: 1) Points; 2) Head-to-head points; 3) Head-to-head goal difference; 4) Head-to-head goals scored; 5) Goal difference; 6) Goals scored; 7) Fair-play points; 8) Drawing lots (Play-off if the winner has to be decided)
(C) Champions; (R) Relegated

== Positions by round ==
To preserve chronological evolvements, any postponed matches are not included to the round at which they were originally scheduled, but added to the full round they were played immediately afterwards. For example, if a match is scheduled for round 7, but then played between rounds 8 and 9, it will be added to the standings for round 8.

Team ╲ Round	1	2	3	4	5	6	7	8	9	10	11	12	13	14	15	16	17	18
Kitchee	2	1	1	3	1	1	1	1	1	1	1	1	1	1	1	1	1	1
Tai Po	4	3	3	2	4	2	3	4	4	3	3	3	3	3	3	3	3	2
Pegasus	1	2	2	1	2	3	2	2	2	2	2	2	2	2	2	2	2	3
Eastern	9	10	9	9	9	9	7	5	5	6	7	4	4	4	4	4	4	4
Southern	10	5	4	5	3	4	5	6	7	8	8	7	8	5	5	5	5	5
Yuen Long	7	4	6	6	6	7	8	9	9	9	9	9	6	7	6	6	6	6
R&F	6	7	8	8	8	6	6	7	8	7	4	5	5	6	7	7	7	7
Lee Man	8	9	7	7	7	8	9	8	6	4	5	6	7	8	8	8	8	8
Dreams FC	3	6	5	4	5	5	4	3	3	5	6	8	9	9	9	9	9	9
Rangers	5	8	10	10	10	10	10	10	10	10	10	10	10	10	10	10	10	10

Leader - 2019 AFC Champions League
Relegation to 2018–19 Hong Kong First Division

Source: Hong Kong Football Association website

== Results ==
Home \ Away	RAN	DSC	EAA	PEG	KIT	SOU	R&F	YLF	LEE	TPO
Rangers		1–1	0–5	1–3	0–6	0–3	1–3	0–1	1–1	0–3
Dreams FC	1–0		0–3	0–5	1–4	4–2	0–3	0–1	2–2	1–1
Eastern	2–0	0–1		3–0	1–8	1–0	5–0	1–1	3–2	1–3
Pegasus	1–3	3–1	1–0		1–1	2–2	3–2	2–2	3–2	3–2
Kitchee	7–0	7–0	1–0	1–0		2–2	3–1	2–0	4–1	2–1
Southern	2–1	1–0	3–2	0–1	1–4		3–1	3–0	2–1	0–1
R&F F.C. (Hong Kong)	2–2	2–1	1–2	1–3	1–3	1–2		2–1	1–0	0–2
Yuen Long	2–1	1–3	0–3	3–3	0–3	2–1	1–2		1–0	2–2
Lee Man	2–0	1–0	3–2	0–2	1–5	3–1	1–4	0–1		2–2
Tai Po	5–1	3–2	1–0	2–1	1–4	1–0	2–0	2–2	2–0	

Updated to match(es) played on 13 May 2018. Source: Hong Kong Football Association
Legend: Blue = home team win; Yellow = draw; Red = away team win.

== Fixtures and results ==
=== Round 1 ===
25 August 2017	Kitchee	1–0	Eastern	Mong Kok, Kowloon
20:00 (UTC+8)	Vadócz 70'	Report		Stadium: Mong Kok Stadium; Attendance: 4,397; Referee: Lau Fong Hei

26 August 2017	Southern	0–1	Pegasus	Aberdeen, Hong Kong Island
14:30 (UTC+8)		Report	Nedeljković 52' (pen.)	Stadium: Aberdeen Sports Ground; Attendance: 520; Referee: Chan Ming Siu

26 August 2017	Dreams FC	1–1	Tai Po	Tsing Yi, New Territories
17:30 (UTC+8)	Ruiz 82'	Report	Eduardo 25'	Stadium: Tsing Yi Sports Ground; Attendance: 973; Referee: Luk Kin Sun

28 October 2017	Yuen Long	1–2	(China) R&F	Yuen Long, New Territories
20:00 (UTC+8)	Lau Ka Ming 14'	Report	Li Rui 28', 63'	Stadium: Yuen Long Stadium; Attendance: 631; Referee: Chan Ming Siu

2 December 2017	Rangers	1–1	Lee Man	Cheung Sha Wan, Kowloon
14:30 (UTC+8)	Clayton 90'	Report	Pereira 27'	Stadium: Sham Shui Po Sports Ground; Attendance: 565; Referee: Ho Wai Sing

=== Round 2 ===
9 September 2017	Southern	2–1	Rangers	Aberdeen, Hong Kong Island
14:30 (UTC+8)	Hui Wang Fung 45+5'; Souza 46'	Report	Chuck Yiu Kwok 64'	Stadium: Aberdeen Sports Ground; Attendance: 326; Referee: Lau Fong Hei

9 September 2017	Pegasus	3–2	(China) R&F	So Kon Po, Hong Kong Island
17:30 (UTC+8)	Awal 43'; Leong Ka Hang 63', 73'	Report	Perović 22'; Yang Ziyi 88'	Stadium: Hong Kong Stadium; Attendance: 545; Referee: Tam Ping Wun

9 September 2017	Eastern	1–3	Tai Po	Mong Kok, Kowloon
20:00 (UTC+8)	Kokko 29'	Report	Yuen Chun Sing 64'; Dudu 86'; Wong Wai 88'	Stadium: Mong Kok Stadium; Attendance: 1,123; Referee: Ng Chiu Kok

10 September 2017	Yuen Long	1–0	Lee Man	Yuen Long, New Territories
14:30 (UTC+8)	Yiu Ho Ming 74'	Report		Stadium: Yuen Long Stadium; Attendance: 1,287; Referee: Ho Wai Sing

10 September 2017	Kitchee	7–0	Dreams FC	Mong Kok, Kowloon
17:30 (UTC+8)	Lucas 29', 45' (pen.), 76', 84'; Sandro 59' (pen.); Jared Lum 78'; Lo Kwan Yee 88'	Report		Stadium: Mong Kok Stadium; Attendance: 1,422

=== Round 3 ===
15 September 2017	Lee Man	3–2	Eastern	Tseung Kwan O, New Territories
20:00 (UTC+8)	Jordi 17'; Law Chun Yan 45'; Chiu Chun Kit 52'	Report	Kokko 50', 56' (pen.)	Stadium: Tseung Kwan O Sports Ground; Attendance: 693; Referee: Liu Kwok Man

16 September 2017	Southern	3–1	(China) R&F	Aberdeen, Hong Kong Island
14:30 (UTC+8)	Souza 20', 32'; Marcos 90+4'	Report	Li Rui 90+3'	Stadium: Aberdeen Sports Ground; Attendance: 379; Referee: Ng Chiu Kok

16 September 2017	Yuen Long	1–3	Dreams FC	Yuen Long, New Territories
17:30 (UTC+8)	Ticão 10'	Report	Chan Wai Ho 22'; Pablo 33'; Joaquín 63'	Stadium: Yuen Long Stadium; Attendance: 1,097; Referee: Lau Fong Hei

17 September 2017	Rangers	0–3	Tai Po	Sham Shui Po, Kowloon
14:30 (UTC+8)		Report	Yuen Chun Sing 45+5'; Sartori 50'; Wong Wai 81'	Stadium: Sham Shui Po Sports Ground; Attendance: 722; Referee: Tang Hing Fu

17 September 2017	Pegasus	1–1	Kitchee	So Kon Po, Hong Kong Island
17:30 (UTC+8)	Major 87'	Report	Fernando 90'	Stadium: Hong Kong Stadium; Attendance: 1,627; Referee: Ho Wai Sing

=== Round 4 ===
30 September 2017	Lee Man	2–2	Tai Po	Tseung Kwan O, New Territories
14:30 (UTC+8)	Victor 8'; Wong Chun Hin 52'	Report	Sartori 32'; Dhiego 70'	Stadium: Tseung Kwan O Sports Ground; Attendance: 572

30 September 2017	Pegasus	1–0	Eastern	So Kon Po, Hong Kong Island
17:30 (UTC+8)	Major 68'	Report		Stadium: Hong Kong Stadium; Attendance: 1,288

1 October 2017	Rangers	0–1	Yuen Long	Sham Shui Po, Kowloon
14:30 (UTC+8)		Report	Ranđelović 45'	Stadium: Sham Shui Po Sports Ground; Attendance: 481; Referee: Liu Kwok Man

1 October 2017	Dreams FC	4–2	Southern	Tsing Yi, New Territories
17:30 (UTC+8)	Lam Hin Ting 16' 73'; Joaquín 39'; Nacho 45'	Report	Luk Chi Ho 30'; Marcos 71'	Stadium: Tsing Yi Sports Ground; Attendance: 767; Referee: Ho Wai Sing

25 November 2017	R&F (China)	1–3	Kitchee	Guangzhou, Guangdong
14:30 (UTC+8)	Hou Junjie 13'	Report	Sandro 45' (pen.); Lum 84'; Fernando 90+3'	Stadium: Yanzigang Stadium; Attendance: 821; Referee: Tang Hing Fu

=== Round 5 ===
14 October 2017	Southern	3–0	Yuen Long	Aberdeen, Hong Kong Island
14:30 (UTC+8)	Marcos 37', 69' (pen.); Souza 87'	Report		Stadium: Aberdeen Sports Ground; Attendance: 530

14 October 2017	Kitchee	2–1	Tai Po	Mong Kok, Kowloon
17:30 (UTC+8)	Vadócz 66'; Sandro 89'	Report	Dudu 22'	Stadium: Mong Kok Stadium; Attendance: 1,595; Referee: Liu Kwok Man

28 December 2017	Eastern	0–1	Dreams FC	Mong Kok, Kowloon
20:00 (UTC+8)		Report	Nacho 42'	Stadium: Mong Kok Stadium; Attendance: 1,073; Referee: Luk Kin-sun

25 November 2017	Lee Man	0–2	Pegasus	Tseung Kwan O, New Territories
17:30 (UTC+8)		Report	Leung Nok Hang 49'; Awal 68'	Stadium: Tseung Kwan O Sports Ground; Attendance: 402; Referee: Tong Kui Sum

22 April 2018	Rangers	1–3	(China) R&F	Sham Shui Po, Kowloon
14:30 (UTC+8)	Krasić 76' (pen.)	Report	Leonço 43'; Li Rui 69'; Giovane 90+2'	Stadium: Sham Shui Po Sports Ground; Referee: Ng Chiu-kok; Assistant referees: Chow Chun-kit, So Kai-man; Fourth official: Chan Ming-siu

=== Round 6 ===
3 November 2017	Kitchee	4–1	Lee Man	Mong Kok, Kowloon
20:00 (UTC+8)	Zhi-Gin Lam 7'; Sandro 51', 57'; Alex 80'	Report	Lima 90+2'	Stadium: Mong Kok Stadium; Attendance: 1,129; Referee: Tam Ping Wun

4 November 2017	Southern	0–1	Tai Po	Aberdeen, Hong Kong Island
14:30 (UTC+8)		Report	Sartori 44' (pen.)	Stadium: Aberdeen Sports Ground; Attendance: 540; Referee: Ho Wai Sing

4 November 2017	Pegasus	1–3	Rangers	So Kon Po, Hong Kong Island
17:30 (UTC+8)	Nedeljković 19' (pen.)	Report	Chuck Yiu Kwok 45', 75'; Gaston 56' (pen.)	Stadium: Hong Kong Stadium; Attendance: 575; Referee: Liu Kwok Man

5 November 2017	R&F (China)	2–1	Dreams FC	Guangzhou, Guangdong
14:30 (UTC+8)	Chen Fuhai 26'; Giovane 60'	Report	Lui Man Tik 55'	Stadium: Yanzigang Stadium; Attendance: 868; Referee: Luk Kin Sun

5 November 2017	Yuen Long	0–3	Eastern	Yuen Long, New Territories
17:30 (UTC+8)		Report	McKee 70'; Lugo 83', 90'	Stadium: Yuen Long Stadium; Attendance: 1,336; Referee: Ng Chiu Kok

=== Round 7 ===
17 November 2017	Eastern	1–0	Southern	Mong Kok, Kowloon
20:00 (UTC+8)	Lee Chi Ho 78'	Report		Stadium: Mong Kok Stadium; Attendance: 1,177

18 November 2017	R&F (China)	1–0	Lee Man	Guangzhou, Guangdong
14:30 (UTC+8)	Li Rui 77'	Report		Stadium: Yanzigang Stadium; Attendance: 821

19 November 2017	Dreams FC	1–0	Rangers	Tsing Yi, New Territories
14:30 (UTC+8)	Lam Hin Ting 45+2'	Report		Stadium: Tsing Yi Sports Ground; Attendance: 643

19 November 2017	Yuen Long	0–3	Kitchee	Yuen Long, New Territories
17:30 (UTC+8)		Report	Lucas 23'; Alex 52'; Vadócz 74'	Stadium: Yuen Long Stadium; Attendance: 1,315

20 November 2017	Pegasus	3–2	Tai Po	So Kon Po, Hong Kong Island
20:00 (UTC+8)	Leung Nok Hang 34'; Major 38', 90+3'	Report	Nakamura 7'; Kolev 29' (o.g.)	Stadium: Hong Kong Stadium; Attendance: 635

=== Round 8 ===
9 December 2017	R&F (China)	1–2	Eastern	Guangzhou, Guangdong
14:30 (UTC+8)	Giovane 20'	Report	Itaparica 32' (o.g.); Xu Deshuai 78'	Stadium: Yanzigang Stadium; Attendance: 799

9 December 2017	Pegasus	3–1	Dreams FC	So Kon Po, Hong Kong Island
17:30 (UTC+8)	Cheung Chi Yung 39'; Major 68', 87'	Report	Pablo 80'	Stadium: Hong Kong Stadium; Attendance: 705

10 December 2017	Tai Po	2–2	Yuen Long	Tai Po, New Territories
14:30 (UTC+8)	Sartori 58'; Chan Hiu Fung 81'	Report	Leung Kwun Chung 40' (o.g.); Chak Ting Fung 62' (o.g.)	Stadium: Tai Po Sports Ground; Attendance: 927; Referee: Tang Hing Fu

10 December 2017	Rangers	0–6	Kitchee	Sham Shui Po, Kowloon
14:30 (UTC+8)		Report	Lo Kwan Yee 9'; Alex 20'; Sandro 41' (pen.); Vadócz 68'; Annan 72'; Matt Lam 90+2'	Stadium: Sham Shui Po Sports Ground; Attendance: 741; Referee: Tam Ping Wun

10 December 2017	Lee Man	3–1	Southern	Tseung Kwan O, New Territories
17:30 (UTC+8)	Stefan 13', 19'; Lima 26'	Report	Lau Hok Ming 5'	Stadium: Tseung Kwan O Sports Ground; Attendance: 352; Referee: Ng Chiu Kok

=== Round 9 ===
12 January 2018	Pegasus	2–2	Yuen Long	So Kon Po, Hong Kong Island
20:00 (UTC+8)	Major 38'; Pereira 71'	Report	Everton 84'; Ticão 90+5'	Stadium: Hong Kong Stadium; Attendance: 671; Referee: Luk Kin Sun

28 January 2018	R&F (China)	0–2	Tai Po	Guangzhou, Guangdong
14:30 (UTC+8)		Report	Sartori 42'; Tan Chun Lok 80'	Stadium: Yanzigang Stadium; Attendance: 816; Referee: Tam Ping Wun

13 January 2018	Eastern	2–0	Rangers	Mong Kok, Kowloon
17:30 (UTC+8)	Rodríguez 66'; McKee 80'	Report		Stadium: Mong Kok Stadium; Attendance: 1,028; Referee: Lau Fong Hei

14 January 2018	Lee Man	1–0	Dreams FC	Tseung Kwan O, New Territories
14:30 (UTC+8)	Lima 1'	Report		Stadium: Tseung Kwan O Sports Ground; Attendance: 497

14 January 2018	Kitchee	2–2	Southern	Mong Kok, Kowloon
17:30 (UTC+8)	Sandro 51'; Jared Lum 66'	Report	Recio 12' (o.g.); Marcos 26'	Stadium: Mong Kok Stadium; Attendance: 3,203

=== Round 10 ===
18 January 2018	Eastern	1–8	Kitchee	Mong Kok, Kowloon
20:00 (UTC+8)	McKee 76'	Report	Lucas 2', 62', 68'; Igawa 28' (o.g.); Vadócz 38'; Jared Lum 55'; Fernando 73', 79'	Stadium: Mong Kok Stadium; Attendance: 5,415; Referee: Chan Ming-siu

20 January 2018	R&F (China)	2–1	Yuen Long	Guangzhou, Guangdong
14:30 (UTC+8)	Karikari 45+2'; Chen Fuhai 89'	Report	Fábio 36'	Stadium: Yanzigang Stadium; Attendance: 739; Referee: Tong Kui-sum

20 January 2018	Pegasus	2–2	Southern	So Kon Po, Hong Kong Island
17:30 (UTC+8)	Awal 63'; Major 90+3'	Report	Marcos 12', 65'	Stadium: Hong Kong Stadium; Attendance: 893; Referee: Lau Fong-hei

21 January 2018	Tai Po	3–2	Dreams FC	Tai Po, New Territories
14:30 (UTC+8)	Praes 27'; Dhiego 65'; Lee Ka Yiu 77'	Report	Lam Hin Ting 21'; Ruiz 45+3'	Stadium: Tai Po Sports Ground; Attendance: 936; Referee: Ho Wai-sing

21 January 2018	Lee Man	2–0	Rangers	Tseung Kwan O, New Territories
17:30 (UTC+8)	Denis 63'; Law Chun Yan 90+3'	Report		Stadium: Tseung Kwan O Sports Ground; Attendance: 399; Referee: Tam Ping Wun

=== Round 11 ===
3 February 2018	Lee Man	1–5	Kitchee	Tseung Kwan O, New Territories
14:30 (UTC+8)	Pereira 4'	Report	Forlán 21', 45+5', 55'; Vadócz 34'; Lucas 77'	Stadium: Tseung Kwan O Sports Ground; Attendance: 1,083; Referee: Ng Chiu Kok

3 February 2018	Dreams FC	0–3	R&F (China)	Tsing Yi, New Territories
17:30 (UTC+8)		Report	Karikari 21'; Leonço 67', 90+1'	Stadium: Tsing Yi Sports Ground; Attendance: 389; Referee: Liu Kwok Man

4 February 2018	Tai Po	1–0	Southern	Tai Po, New Territories
14:30 (UTC+8)	Lee Ka Yiu 87'	Report		Stadium: Tai Po Sports Ground; Attendance: 724; Referee: Lau Fong Hei

4 February 2018	Rangers	1–3	Pegasus	Sham Shui Po, Kowloon
14:30 (UTC+8)	Krasić 78' (pen.)	Report	Komazec 47'; Awal 66'; Major 71'	Stadium: Sham Shui Po Sports Ground; Attendance: 279; Referee: Tang Hing Fu

4 February 2018	Eastern	1–1	Yuen Long	Mong Kok, Kowloon
17:30 (UTC+8)	Lugo 8'	Report	Everton 80' (pen.)	Stadium: Mong Kok Stadium; Attendance: 810; Referee: Tam Ping Wun

=== Round 12 ===
24 February 2018	Southern	1–0	Dreams FC	Aberdeen, Hong Kong Island
14:30 (UTC+8)	Marcos de la Espada 25'	Report		Stadium: Aberdeen Sports Ground; Attendance: 487

24 February 2018	Eastern	3–0	Pegasus	Mong Kok, Kowloon
17:30 (UTC+8)	Saba 40'; Ng Wai Chiu 73'; Bruno 76'	Report		Stadium: Mong Kok Stadium; Attendance: 1353

25 February 2018	Tai Po	2–0	Lee Man	Tai Po, New Territories
14:30 (UTC+8)	Sartori 58', 63' (pen.)	Report		Stadium: Tai Po Sports Ground; Attendance: 676

25 February 2018	Yuen Long	2–1	Rangers	Yuen Long, New Territories
17:30 (UTC+8)	Ranđelović 70'; Lai Yiu Cheong 88'	Report	Mauricio 84'	Stadium: Yuen Long Stadium; Attendance: 694

26 February 2018	Kitchee	3–1	R&F (China)	Mong Kok, Kowloon
20:00 (UTC+8)	Lucas 69', 90+3'; Vadócz 86'	Report	Leonço 45+2'	Stadium: Mong Kok Stadium; Attendance: 997

=== Round 13 ===
2 March 2018	Pegasus	3–2	Lee Man	So Kon Po, Hong Kong Island
20:00 (UTC+8)	Major 36', 71'; Pereira 54'	Report	Stefan 12'; Yu Pui Hong 65'	Stadium: Hong Kong Stadium; Attendance: 531

3 March 2018	Tai Po	1–4	Kitchee	Tai Po, New Territories
14:30 (UTC+8)	Dhiego 88'	Report	Lucas 5'; Sandro 62', 75'; Recio 90+4'	Stadium: Tai Po Sports Ground; Attendance: 1821

3 March 2018	Yuen Long	2–1	Southern	Yuen Long, New Territories
17:30 (UTC+8)	Ranđelović 59'; Everton 77' (pen.)	Report	Marcos 49'	Stadium: Yuen Long Stadium; Attendance: 759

4 March 2018	R&F (China)	2–2	Rangers	Guangzhou, Guangdong
14:30 (UTC+8)	Itaparica 69'; Giovane 72'	Report	Sasaki 35'; Tang Lok Man 89'	Stadium: Yanzigang Stadium; Attendance: 743; Referee: Tang Hing Fu

4 March 2018	Dreams FC	0–3	Eastern	Tsing Yi, New Territories
17:30 (UTC+8)		Report	McKee 18'; Bruno 69' (pen.); Bleda 73'	Stadium: Tsing Yi Sports Ground; Attendance: 796

=== Round 14 ===
28 January 2018	Kitchee	7–0	Rangers	Mong Kok, Kowloon
14:30 (UTC+8)	Forlán 38', 61'; Lucas 45+1', 45+2'; Alex 81', 90'; Paulinho 90+1'	Report		Stadium: Mong Kok Stadium; Attendance: 1,475; Referee: Lau Fong-hei

9 March 2018	Eastern	5–0	R&F (China)	Mong Kok, Kowloon
20:00 (UTC+8)	Vítor Saba 8'; Bruno 35', 45+1'; Lee Hong Lim 65'; Bleda 79'	Report		Stadium: Mong Kok Stadium; Attendance: 739; Referee: Lau Fong-hei; Assistant referees: Law Ming Leong, Yau Tsz Yeung; Fourth official: Law Bik Chi

10 March 2018	Southern	2–1	Lee Man	Aberdeen, Hong Kong Island
14:30 (UTC+8)	Marcos 48'; Wellingsson 60'	Report	Matt Lam 10'	Stadium: Aberdeen Sports Ground; Attendance: 759; Referee: Chan Ming-siu; Assistant referees: Cheng Oi-cho, Amarjit Sarao; Fourth official: Ip Chi-wing

11 March 2018	Yuen Long	2–2	Tai Po	Yuen Long, New Territories
14:30 (UTC+8)	Camargo 48' (pen.), 81'	Report	Dudu 5'; Eduardo Praes 90+6'	Stadium: Yuen Long Stadium; Attendance: 1,037; Referee: Tang Hing Fu; Assistant referees: Chow Chun Kit, Lo Ka Fai; Fourth official: So Kai Man

11 March 2018	Dreams FC	0–5	Pegasus	Tsing Yi, New Territories
17:30 (UTC+8)		Report	João Emir 30' (pen.), 46'; Mbome 50'; Chan Siu Ki 52'; Major 72'	Stadium: Tsing Yi Sports Ground; Attendance: 740; Referee: Tam Ping Wun; Assistant referees: Lam Nai Kei, Wong Ping Chung; Fourth official: Wong Kei Hoi

=== Round 15 ===
31 March 2018	R&F (China)	1–3	Pegasus	Guangzhou, Guangdong
14:30 (UTC+8)	Li Rui 90+4'	Report	Awal 14'; Wu Chun Ming 63'; Major 77'}	Stadium: Yanzigang Stadium; Attendance: 793; Referee: Chan Ming-siu; Assistant referees: Chow Chun-kit, Ching Oi-cho; Fourth official: Leung Chung-yin

31 March 2018	Dreams FC	1–4	Kitchee	Tsing Yi, New Territories
17:30 (UTC+8)	Yoon Dong-hun 16'	Report	Vadócz 9'; Sandro 14'; Kim Dong-jin 18'; Paulinho 79'	Stadium: Tsing Yi Sports Ground; Attendance: 1359; Referee: Liu Kwok-man; Assistant referees: Fok Pong-shing, So Yue-hang; Fourth official: Wong Kei-hoi

1 April 2018	Rangers	0–3	Southern	Sham Shui Po, Kowloon
14:30 (UTC+8)		Report	Beto 40'; Souza 69'; Leung Tsz Chun 81'	Stadium: Sham Shui Po Sports Ground; Attendance: 458; Referee: Yu Kin-fung; Assistant referees: Law Ming-leong, Wong Wai-lun; Fourth official: Ng Wai-hong

1 April 2018	Lee Man	0–1	Yuen Long	Tseung Kwan O, New Territories
17:30 (UTC+8)		Report	Everton 73'	Stadium: Tseung Kwan O Sports Ground; Attendance: 344; Referee: Ng Chiu-kok; Assistant referees: Lo Yuk-ming, Poon Chun-kit; Fourth official: Wong Ka-ho

2 April 2018	Tai Po	1–0	Eastern	Tai Po, New Territories
14:30 (UTC+8)	Dudu 22'	Report		Stadium: Tai Po Sports Ground; Attendance: 1070; Referee: Lau Fong-hei; Assistant referees: Lam Nai-kei, Yau Tsz-yeung; Fourth official: Law Bik-chi

=== Round 16 ===
13 April 2018	Kitchee	1–0	Pegasus	Mong Kok, Kowloon
20:00 (UTC+8)	Lucas 4'	Report		Stadium: Mong Kok Stadium; Attendance: 2759; Referee: Liu Kwok-man; Assistant referees: Law Ming-leong, Sarao Amarjit Singh; Fourth official: Ng Chiu-kok

14 April 2018	R&F (China)	1–2	Southern	Guangzhou, Guangdong
14:30 (UTC+8)	Leonço 6'	Report	Chan Siu Kwan 63'; Marcos 90+4'	Stadium: Yanzigang Stadium; Attendance: 770; Referee: Wong Kei-hoi; Assistant referees: Fok Pong-shing, Yau Tsz-yeung; Fourth official: Yu Kin-fung

14 April 2018	Eastern	3–2	Lee Man	Mong Kok, Kowloon
17:30 (UTC+8)	Bai He 50'; Bleda 63'; McKee 90+3'	Report	Tse Long Hin 11'; Ngan Lok Fung 16'	Stadium: Mong Kok Stadium; Attendance: 879; Referee: Lau Fong-hei; Assistant referees: Law Bik-chi, Sian Massey-Ellis; Fourth official: Tam Ping Wun

15 April 2018	Tai Po	5–1	Rangers	Tai Po, New Territories
14:30 (UTC+8)	Leung Kwun Chung 11'; Dhiego 17'; Wong Wai 49'; Sartori 62', 73'	Report	Miović 79'	Stadium: Tai Po Sports Ground; Attendance: 411; Referee: Luk Kin-sun; Assistant referees: Chow Chun-kit, So Kai-man; Fourth official: Suen Ming-shum

15 April 2018	Dreams FC	0–1	Yuen Long	Tsing Yi, New Territories
17:30 (UTC+8)		Report	Tomas 62'	Stadium: Tsing Yi Sports Ground; Attendance: 496; Referee: Tam Ping Wun; Assistant referees: Lam Nai-kei, Wong Ping-chung; Fourth official: Wong Ka-ho

=== Round 17 ===
28 April 2018	Southern	1–4	Kitchee	Aberdeen, Hong Kong Island
14:30 (UTC+8)	Souza 53'	Report	Jordi 21'; Paulinho 59'; Cheng Chin Lung 73', 81'	Stadium: Aberdeen Sports Ground; Attendance: 838; Referee: Lau Fong-hei

29 April 2018	Tai Po	2–0	R&F (China)	Tai Po, New Territories
14:30 (UTC+8)	Wong Wai 28'; Dudu 76'	Report		Stadium: Tai Po Sports Ground; Attendance: 570; Referee: Liu Kwok-man

29 April 2018	Dreams FC	2–2	Lee Man	Tsing Yi, New Territories
17:30 (UTC+8)	Yoon Dong-hun 29'; Chan Wai Ho 41'	Report	Stefan 20', 24'	Stadium: Tsing Yi Sports Ground; Attendance: 544; Referee: Chan Ming-siu

1 May 2018	Rangers	0–5	Eastern	Sham Shui Po, Kowloon
14:30 (UTC+8)		Report	Clayton 9'; Lo Kong Wai 30'; Bleda 58'; Lugo 63'; Igawa 77'	Stadium: Sham Shui Po Sports Ground; Attendance: 563; Referee: Law Bik-chi

1 May 2018	Yuen Long	3–3	Pegasus	Yuen Long, New Territories
17:30 (UTC+8)	Juninho 37', 48'; Fábio 76'	Report	Fong Pak Lun 66'; Pereira 79' (pen.), 89'	Stadium: Yuen Long Stadium; Attendance: 2006; Referee: Ng Chiu-kok

=== Round 18 ===
13 May 2018	Southern	3–2	Eastern	Aberdeen, Hong Kong Island
14:30 (UTC+8)	Marcos 15', 24'; Beto 78'	Report	Xu Deshuai 58'; Lugo 66' (pen.)	Stadium: Aberdeen Sports Ground; Attendance: 413; Referee: Ng Chiu-kok

13 May 2018	Tai Po	2–1	Pegasus	Tai Po, New Territories
14:30 (UTC+8)	Eduardo 69'; Sean Tse 89'	Report	Chan Siu Ki 11'	Stadium: Tai Po Sports Ground; Attendance: 1427; Referee: Ho Wai-sing

13 May 2018	Rangers	1–1	Dreams FC	Sham Shui Po, Kowloon
14:30 (UTC+8)	Lam Hin Ting 54'	Report	Sasaki 83' (pen.)	Stadium: Sham Shui Po Sports Ground; Attendance: 233; Referee: Wong Kei-hon

13 May 2018	Lee Man	1–4	R&F (China)	Tseung Kwan O, New Territories
14:30 (UTC+8)	Wong Chun Hin 55'	Report	Giovane 25', 90'; Chen Fuhai 61'; Leonço 83'	Stadium: Tseung Kwan O Sports Ground; Attendance: 240; Referee: Law Bik-chi

13 May 2018	Kitchee	2–0	Yuen Long	Mong Kok, Kowloon
14:30 (UTC+8)	Paulinho 87'; Fernando 90+2'	Report		Stadium: Mong Kok Stadium; Attendance: 2251; Referee: Yu Kin-fung

== Scoring ==
=== Top Scorers ===
Rank	Player	Club	Goals
1	(Brazil) Lucas Silva	Kitchee	15
2	(Australia) Travis Major	Pegasus	13
2	(Spain) Marcos de la Espada	Southern	13
4	(Hong Kong) Sandro	Kitchee	10
5	(Brazil) Igor Sartori	Tai Po	9
6	(Hungary) Krisztián Vadócz	Kitchee	8
7	(Brazil) Everton Camargo	Yuen Long	7
7	(Brazil) Wellingsson	Southern	7
7	(Brazil) Stefan	Lee Man	7
10	(China) Li Rui	R&F	6
10	(Brazil) João Emir	Pegasus	6
10	(Brazil) Leonço	R&F	6
10	(Brazil) Giovane	R&F	6

As of matches played 13 May 2018

==== Hat-tricks ====
Note: The results column shows the scorer's team score first. Teams in bold are home teams.

#	Player	Nationality	For	Against	Result	Date	Ref
1	Lucas^{^{4}}	Brazil	**Kitchee**	Dreams FC	7–0	10 September 2017	
2	Lucas	Brazil	Kitchee	**Eastern Long Lions**	8–1	18 January 2018	
3	Diego Forlán	Uruguay	Kitchee	**Lee Man**	5–1	3 February 2018	

=== Clean sheets ===
Rank	Player	Club	Matches
1	Yapp Hung Fai	Eastern	8
2	Wang Zhen Pang	Kitchee	6
3	Tsang Man Fai	Tai Po	4
3	(China) Zhou Yuchen	R&F	4
5	Tse Tak Him	Southern	3
5	Leung Hing Kit	Pegasus	3
5	Pang Tsz Kin	Lee Man	3
8	Chan Ka Ho	Yuen Long	2
8	(Brazil) Paulo	Hoi King	2

== Attendances ==
Pos	Team	Total	High	Low	Average	Change
1	Kitchee	19,228	4,397	997	2,136	+15.5%
2	Eastern	13,597	5,415	739	1,511	−21.4%
3	Yuen Long	10,162	2,006	631	1,129	−19.1%
4	Tai Po	8,562	1,821	411	951	+24.5%
5	Pegasus	7,470	1,627	531	830	+14.6%
6	R&F	7,170	868	739	797	+285.0%
7	Dreams FC	6,707	1,359	389	745	+62.0%
8	Lee Man	4,582	1,083	240	509	n/a^{1}
9	Southern	4,434	838	326	493	−7.3%
10	Rangers	4,365	741	233	485	−6.6%
	League total	86,287	5,415	233	959	+4.2%

Source: Soccerway
Notes:
1: Team did not play in the Premier League last season

== Hong Kong Top Footballer Awards ==
Awards	Prize Winner	Club	Votes
Footballer of the Year	(Hungary) Krisztián Vadócz	Kitchee	79.22%
Coach of the Year	(Hong Kong) Chu Chi Kwong	Kitchee	56.56%
Young Players of the Year	(Hong Kong) Cheng Chin Lung	Kitchee	70.82%
Young Players of the Year	(Hong Kong) Lam Hin Ting	Dreams FC	34.21%
Players' Player	(Hungary) Krisztián Vadócz	Kitchee	41
Most Favorite Player	(Hungary) Krisztián Vadócz	Kitchee	3,030
Hong Kong Top Footballers
Goalkeeper	(Hong Kong) Wang Zhenpeng	Kitchee	49.42%
Defenders	(Hong Kong) Tong Kin Man	Kitchee	69.59%
Defenders	(Hong Kong) Cheung Chi Yung	Pegasus	51.23%
Defenders	(South Korea) Kim Bong-jin	Kitchee	39.57%
Defenders	(Brazil) Fábio	Yuen Long	37.79%
Midfielders	(Hungary) Krisztián Vadócz	Kitchee	79.22%
Midfielders	(Hong Kong) Wong Wai	Tai Po	50.83%
Midfielders	(Brazil) Fernando	Kitchee	49.64%
Midfielders	(Hong Kong) Huang Yang	Kitchee	44.59%
Forwards	(Brazil) Everton Camargo	Yuen Long	56.25%
Forwards	(Brazil) Lucas Silva	Kitchee	42.94%
