= Arkaitz Ruiz =

Spanish footballer

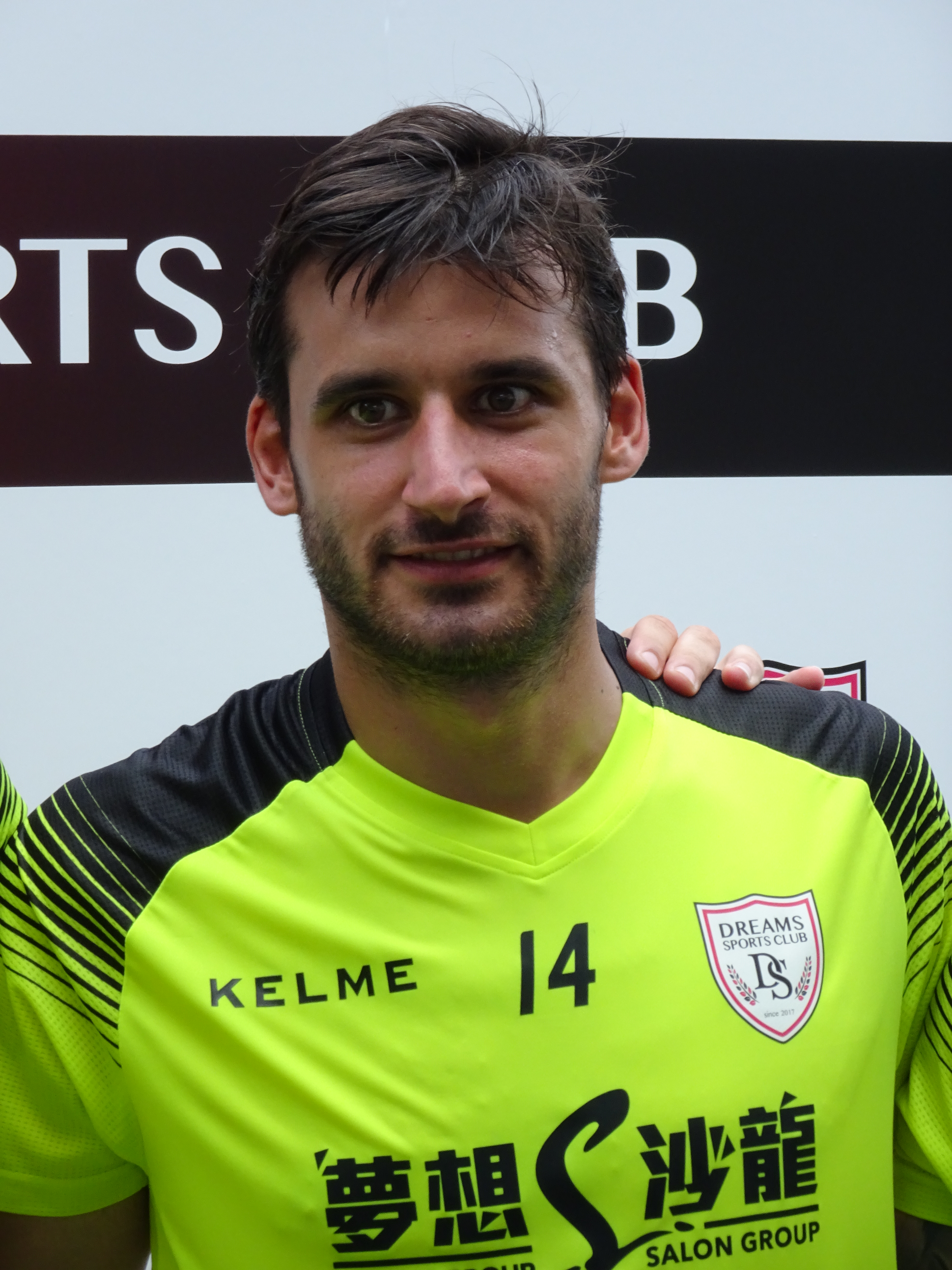

Personal information
- Full name: Arkaitz Ruiz de Miguel
- Date of birth: 18 July 1989 (age 37)
- Place of birth: Navarre, Spain
- Height: 1.81 m (5 ft 11 in)
- Position: Centre forward

Youth career
- Osasuna

Senior career*
Years	Team	Apps	(Gls)
2008–2010	Basconia	30	(9)
2009–2010	Bilbao Athletic	25	(4)
2010–2011	Polideportivo Ejido	35	(2)
2011–2012	Sporting Mahonés	13	(2)
2012–2014	Burgos	84	(14)
2014–2015	Zamora	34	(11)
2015–2016	Tudelano	32	(3)
2016–2017	Somozas	37	(8)
2017–2018	Dreams	13	(2)
- * Club domestic league appearances and goals as of 13 May 2018

Arkaitz Ruiz de Miguel (born 18 July 1989) is a Spanish footballer who plays as a centre forward.

== Club career ==
Born in Navarre, Ruiz graduated from the youth academy of CA Osasuna. He made his senior debut with CD Basconia in 2008–09 season and in the following year, he was promoted to Bilbao Athletic, which competed in the Segunda División B. On 22 July 2011, he signed for CF Sporting Mahones after a season with Polideportivo Ejido.

In December 2011, Ruiz was transferred to Burgos CF in the same division, but at the end of the season, the club was relegated to the Tercera División. He continued his career with the club in Tercera, scoring the winning goal in the promotion play-offs. On 17 July 2013, his contract was renewed, keeping him with the club for another season.

After three seasons with Burgos CF, Ruiz joined Zamora CF on 14 July 2014. In the following two seasons, he went on to represent CD Tudelano and UD Somozas.

In September 2017, Ruiz moved abroad and signed for Hong Kong club Dreams Sports Club, sharing team with fellow Spaniards Pablo Gallardo, José Pedrosa Galán, Nacho Martínez and Joaquin García. On 31 August, he made his debut, scoring the equaliser in a 1–1 draw against Tai Po.

== Career statistics ==
As of match played on 29 April 2018

Club	Season	League			Cup		Other		Total	
Club	Season	Division	Apps	Goals	Apps	Goals	Apps	Goals	Apps	Goals
Basconia	2008–09	Tercera División	29	9	—		—		29	9
Basconia	2009–10	Tercera División	1	0	—		—		1	0
Basconia	Total		30	9	—		—		30	9
Bilbao Athletic	2009–10	Segunda División B	25	4	—		—		25	4
Poli Ejido	2010–11	Segunda División B	35	2	3	0	—		38	2
Sporting Mahonés	2011–12	Segunda División B	13	2	0	0	—		13	2
Burgos	2011–12	Segunda División B	16	3	0	0	—		16	3
Burgos	2012–13	Tercera División	34	6	0	0	2 (Note: Appearances in Promotion Play-offs)	1	36	7
Burgos	2013–14	Segunda División B	34	5	3	0	—		37	5
Burgos	Total		84	14	3	0	2	1	89	15
Zamora	2014–15	Segunda División B	34	11	1	2	—		35	13
Tudelano	2015–16	Segunda División B	32	3	2	2	—		34	5
Somozas	2016–17	Segunda División B	37	8	0	0	—		37	8
Dreams	2017–18	HK Premier League	13	2	2	0	—		15	2
Career total			303	55	11	4	2	1	316	60
