= Cheng Chin Lung =

Hong Kong footballer (born 1998)

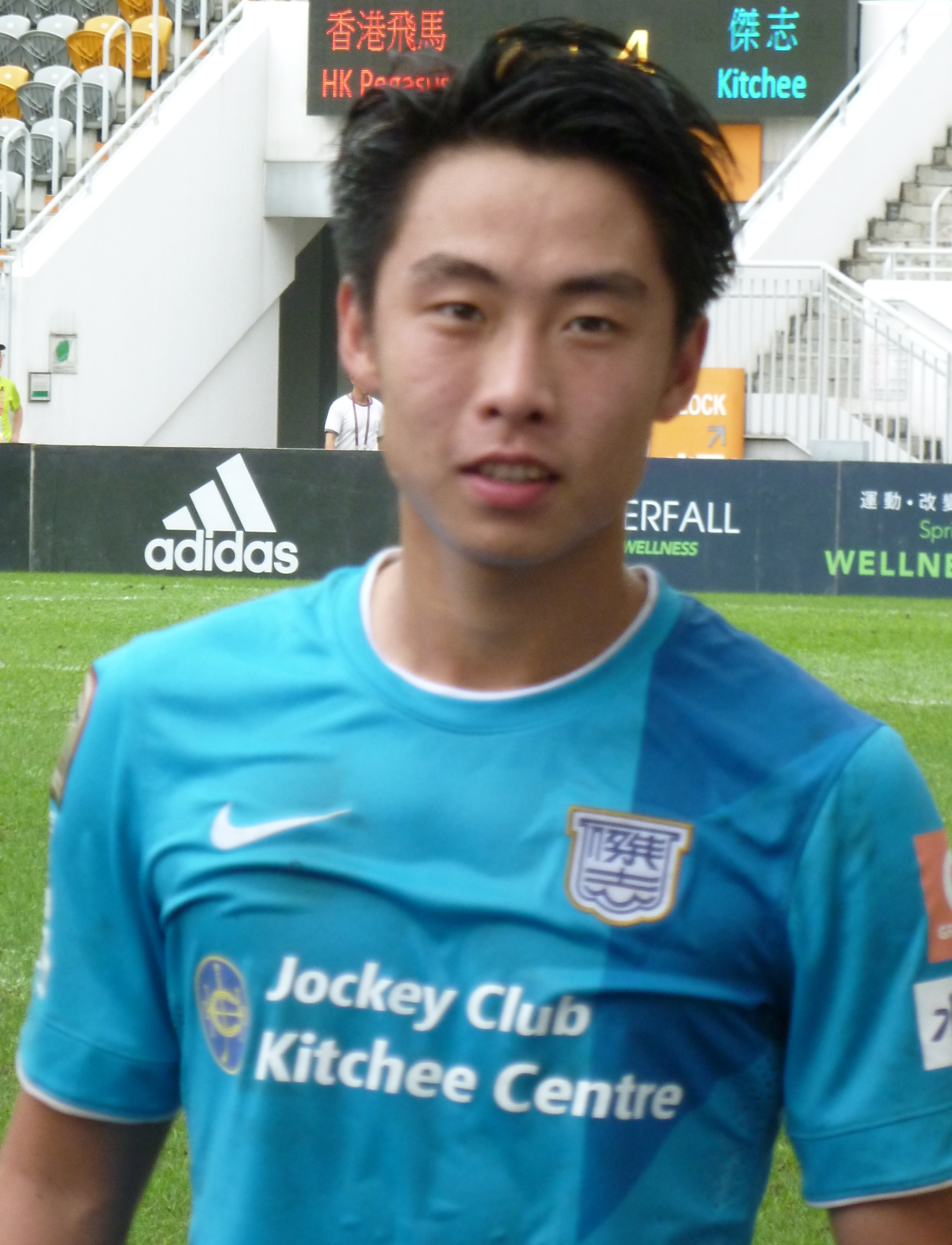

Personal information
- Full name: Cheng Chin Lung
- Date of birth: 7 January 1998 (age 28)
- Place of birth: Hong Kong
- Height: 1.70 m (5 ft 7 in)
- Position: Attacking midfielder

Team information
- Current team: Kitchee
- Number: 8

Youth career
- 2008–2015: Kitchee

Senior career*
Years	Team	Apps	(Gls)
2015–	Kitchee	88	(8)
2017–2018	→ Dreams FC (loan)	8	(0)
2021–2022	→ Southern (loan)	4	(0)

International career^{‡}
2013–2014	Hong Kong U-16	7	(2)
2015	Hong Kong U-19	3	(1)
2017–2019	Hong Kong U-23	3	(0)
2017–2022	Hong Kong	6	(0)
- * Club domestic league appearances and goals as of 12 September 2025 ‡ National team caps and goals as of 24 September 2022

Cheng Chin Lung (Chinese: 鄭展龍; Jyutping: Zeng6 Zin2lung4; born 7 January 1998) is a Hong Kong professional footballer who currently plays for Hong Kong Premier League club Kitchee.

== Youth career ==
A fan of both basketball and football, Cheng applied to join the Kitchee academy at age 9 but was turned down. Not wanting to waste his son's talent, Cheng's father sought out academy coach Chu Chi Kwong personally to ask him to give his son another chance. Cheng was granted another trial and was accepted into the academy at age 10. He later became part of the first class of players to graduate from the Kitchee academy and into the first team when he signed a professional contract in 2015.

== Club career ==
During Kitchee's 2015 AFC Cup quarter final match on 16 September 2015, Cheng was handed his first team debut as a substitute late in the match. On 23 April 2016, Cheng scored his first professional goal in a 4–2 win over Hong Kong Pegasus.

In June 2016, Cheng tore his anterior cruciate ligament in a HKFA Youth Cup match and was sidelined for nine months following surgery and rehabilitation. Cheng missed the entire 2016–17 season as a result of the injury.

In July 2017, new Dreams FC manager Leung Chi Wing persuaded Cheng to join his club on loan. On 26 August, he played his first professional match in over a year, starting the game and playing 65 minutes against Tai Po. On 9 January 2018, Cheng was recalled by Kitchee ahead of their 2018 AFC Champions League campaign.

On 14 March 2018, Cheng scored a stunning left-footed curler at the edge of the penalty box in the 92nd minute to give Kitchee a historic 1–0 win in the 2018 AFC Champions League Group stage match over Japanese side Kashiwa Reysol, making him the first ever Hong Kong-born player to receive Man of the Match and Kitchee the first ever team from Hong Kong to win a game in the Champions League.

On 16 August 2021, Cheng joined Southern on loan.

On 3 March 2022, Cheng returned to Kitchee from loan.

== International career ==
On 9 November 2017, Cheng made his senior national team debut in a friendly against Bahrain at the age of 19.

== Career statistics ==
=== Club ===
As of 23 February 2020.

Club	Season	League			FA Cup		Senior Shield		Continental		Other		Total	
Club	Season	Division	Apps	Goals	Apps	Goals	Apps	Goals	Apps	Goals	Apps	Goals	Apps	Goals
Kitchee	2014–15	Hong Kong Premier League	0	0	0	0	0	0	1 (Note: Appearances in the AFC Cup)	0	0	0	1	0
Kitchee	2015–16	Hong Kong Premier League	2	1	0	0	0	0	4	1	3 (Note: Appearances in the Hong Kong Sapling Cup & 2015–16 Hong Kong season play-off)	0	9	2
Kitchee	2016–17	Hong Kong Premier League	0	0	0	0	0	0	0	0	0	0	0	0
Kitchee	Total		2	1	0	0	0	0	5	1	3	0	10	2
Dreams FC (loan)	2017–18	Hong Kong Premier League	8	0	1	0	1	0	—		2 (Note: Appearances in the Hong Kong Sapling Cup)	2	12	2
Kitchee	2017–18	Hong Kong Premier League	4	2	0	0	0	0	4 (Note: Appearances in the AFC Champions League)	1	0	0	8	3
Kitchee	2018–19	Hong Kong Premier League	4	1	1	0	0	0	7 (Note: Appearances in the AFC Champions League qualification & AFC Cup)	2	4	0	16	3
Kitchee	2019–20	Hong Kong Premier League	6	1	0	0	1	0	0	0	8	0	15	1
Kitchee	Total		14	4	1	0	1	0	11	3	12	0	39	7
Career total			24	5	2	0	2	0	16	4	17	2	61	11

=== International ===
As of matches played 24 September 2022.

National team	Year	Apps	Goals
Hong Kong	2017	1	0
Hong Kong	2018	0	0
Hong Kong	2019	2	0
Hong Kong	2020	0	0
Hong Kong	2021	0	0
Hong Kong	2022	3	0
Total		6	0

#	Date	Venue	Opponent	Result	Competition
2017
1	11 September 2017	Mong Kok Stadium, Mong Kok, Hong Kong	Bahrain	0–2	Friendly
2019
2	14 December 2019	Busan Gudeok Stadium, Busan, South Korea	Japan	0–5	2019 EAFF E-1 Football Championship
3	18 December 2019	Busan Asiad Main Stadium, Busan, South Korea	China	0–2	2019 EAFF E-1 Football Championship
2022
4	19 July 2022	Kashima Stadium, Kashima, Japan	Japan	0–6	2022 EAFF E-1 Football Championship
5	21 September 2022	Mong Kok Stadium, Mong Kok, Hong Kong	Myanmar	2–0	Friendly
6	24 September 2022	Hong Kong Stadium, Hong Kong	Myanmar	0–0	Friendly

== Honours ==
=== Club ===
Kitchee

- Hong Kong Premier League: 2016–17, 2017–18, 2019–20, 2020–21, 2022–23, 2025–26
- Hong Kong Senior Shield: 2016–17, 2018–19, 2022–23, 2023–24
- Hong Kong FA Cup: 2016–17, 2017–18, 2018–19, 2022–23
- Hong Kong Sapling Cup: 2017–18, 2019–20
- Hong Kong League Cup: 2015–16
- HKPLC Cup: 2023–24

=== Individual ===
- Best Young Player: 2018
