= Tong Kin Man =

Hong Kong footballer (born 1985)

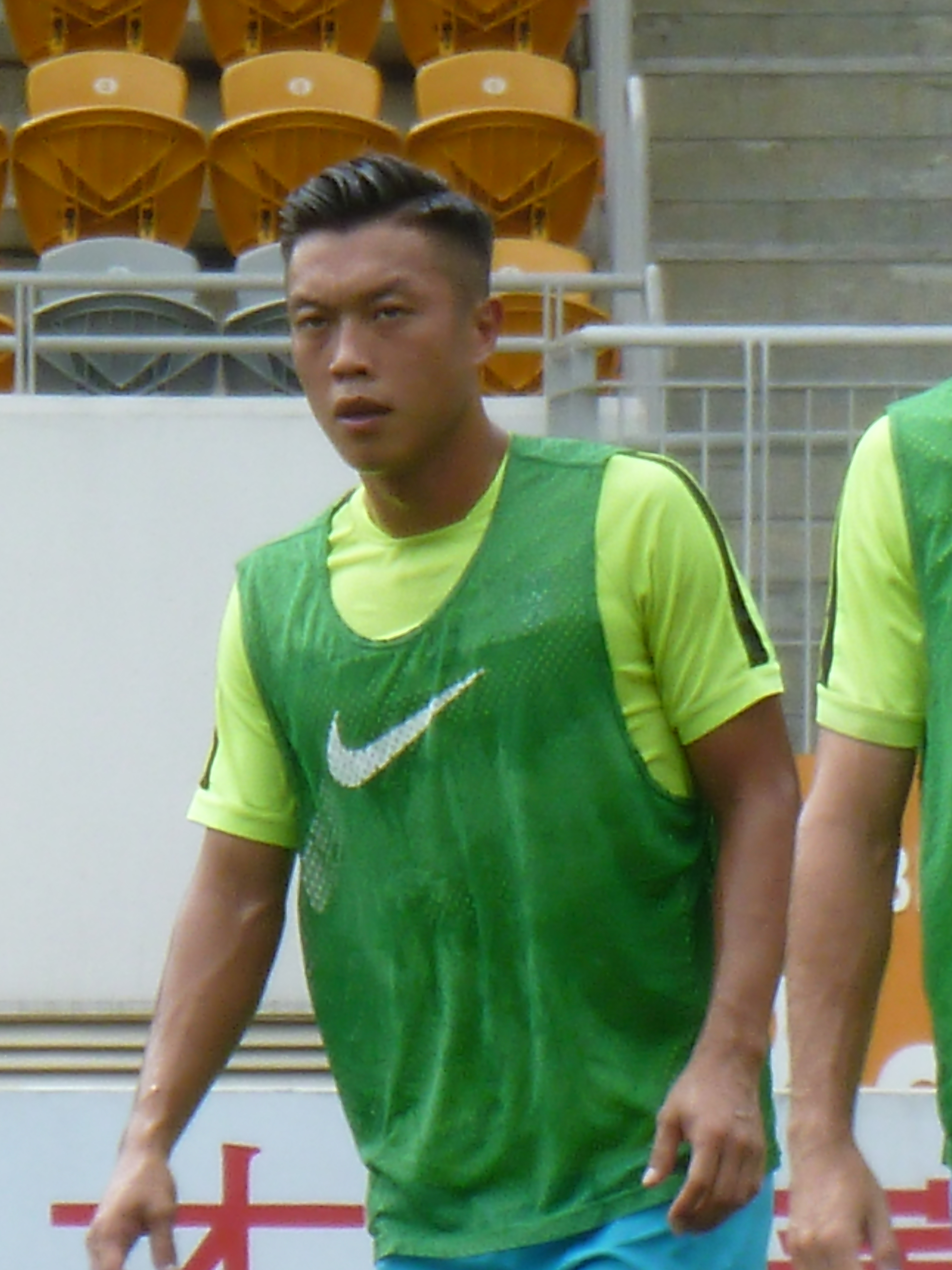
- Tong warming up with Kitchee in 2016

Personal information
- Full name: Tong Kin Man
- Date of birth: 10 January 1985 (age 41)
- Place of birth: Hong Kong
- Height: 1.75 m (5 ft 9 in)
- Position: Right back

Senior career*
Years	Team	Apps	(Gls)
2000–2001	Po Chai Pills		
2001–2005	Fukien	46	(4)
2005–2009	Happy Valley	40	(0)
2007–2008	→ Eastern (loan)	16	(0)
2009–2011	Kitchee	4	(0)
2010–2011	→ Tai Chung (loan)	27	(2)
2011–2012	Rangers	16	(0)
2012–2015	Pegasus	45	(2)
2015–2022	Kitchee	61	(2)

International career^{‡}
- Hong Kong U-23
2018–2021	Hong Kong	11	(0)

Managerial career
- 2012–2013: Pegasus (assistant coach)
- * Club domestic league appearances and goals as of 1 July 2022 ‡ National team caps and goals as of 15 June 2021

Tong Kin Man (Chinese: 唐建文; born 10 January 1985 in Hong Kong) is a former Hong Kong professional football player who played as a right back.

== Club career ==
On 4 July 2008, Happy Valley loaned Tong to Eastern.

In 2009, Tong signed for Hong Kong First Division League club Kitchee, after half season, Tong was loaned to Tai Chung.

On 13 March 2011, Tong scored his first goal in for Tai Chung against HKFC, in 4–2 win for his team.

In 2012, Tong signed for Hong Kong First Division League club Pegasus and became the team captain. He was also the assistant manager of the club in the 2012–13 season.

On 3 November 2013, Tong scored his first goal for Pegasus against Sun Hei, in a 2–0 win.

28 October 2014, Tong scored his first goal in 2014–15 Hong Kong Premier League for Sun Pegasus against South China, in a 3–0 win for Pegasus.

In June 2015, Tong returned to Hong Kong Premier League club Kitchee.

On 1 July 2022, Tong left Kitchee after 7 years with the club. 2 days later, he announced his retirement from professional football.

== International career ==
On 27 March 2018, Tong made his debut for the Hong Kong national football team for the first time, at the age of 33, in the match against North Korea in the 2019 AFC Asian Cup qualification.

== Career statistics ==
=== Club ===
Updated on 21 May 2021

Club	Season	League		Senior Shield		League Cup		FA Cup		AFC Cup		Total	
Club	Season	Apps	Goals	Apps	Goals	Apps	Goals	Apps	Goals	Apps	Goals	Apps	Goals
Kitchee	2009–10	5	0	-		-		-		-		5	0
Tai Chung	2009–10	10	0	-		-		-		-		10	0
Tai Chung	2010–11	17	2	-		-		1	0	-		18	2
Metro Gallery	2011–12	16	0	-		1	0	1	0	-		18	0
Pegasus	2012–13	14	1	1	0	-		5	0	-		20	1
Pegasus	2013–14	17	0	4	0	-		1	0	-		22	0
Pegasus	2014–15	14	1	1	0	2	0	1	0	2	0	20	1
Kitchee	2015–16	11	0	1	0	3	0	1	0	7	0	23	0
Kitchee	2016–17	9	0	1	0	-		4	2	2	0	16	3
Kitchee	2017–18	11	0	1	0	-		3	0	5	0	20	0
Kitchee	2018–19	13	1	3	0	-		3	0	5	0	24	0
Kitchee	2019–20	11	1	0	0	-		1	0	-		12	1
Kitchee	2020–21	6	0	-		-		-		-		6	0
Total		152	6	12	0	6	0	21	2	21	0	214	8

=== International ===
As of matches played 15 June 2021

National team	Year	Apps	Goals
Hong Kong	2018	2	0
Hong Kong	2019	7	0
Hong Kong	2020	0	0
Hong Kong	2021	2	0
Total		11	0

== Honours ==
Pegasus

- Hong Kong FA Cup: 2015–16

Kitchee

- Hong Kong Premier League: 2016–17, 2017–18, 2019–20
- Hong Kong Senior Shield: 2016–17, 2018–19
- Hong Kong FA Cup: 2016–17, 2017–18, 2018–19
- Hong Kong Sapling Cup: 2017–18, 2019–20
- Hong Kong League Cup: 2015–16
- Hong Kong Community Cup: 2016–17, 2017–18
