= 2018–19 Hong Kong Senior Shield =

Tournament details
- Country: Hong Kong
- Teams: 10

Final positions
- Champions: Kitchee (7th title)
- Runners-up: Tai Po

Tournament statistics
- Matches played: 9
- Goals scored: 30 (3.33 per match)
- Attendance: 12,749 (1,417 per match)

Awards
- Best player: Fernando

The 2018–19 Hong Kong Senior Shield was the 117th edition of the Hong Kong Senior Shield. Ten teams entered this edition, with two games being played in First Round before the Quarter-final stage. The competition was only open to teams that played in the 2018–19 Hong Kong Premier League.

The champions received HK$150,000 in prize money while the runners up received HK$50,000. The MVP of the final received a HK$10,000 bonus.

== Calendar ==
Stage	Round	Date
Knockout	First round	20 – 21 September 2018
Knockout	Quarter-final	27 – 28 October 2018
Knockout	Semi-final	23 – 25 December 2018
Knockout	Final	26 January 2019

Source:HKFA

== Bracket ==
First round
**Dreams FC**	**1 (4)**
Pegasus	1 (2)
**Tai Po**	**5**
Hoi King	0

Quarter-finals
**Kitchee**	**2**
Dreams FC	1
**Eastern**	**2**
Lee Man	1
Southern	0
**Tai Po**	**1**
Yuen Long	1
**R&F**	**2**

Semi-finals
**Kitchee**	**3**
Eastern	1
**Tai Po**	**3**
R&F	1

Final
**Kitchee**	**3**
Tai Po	2

Bold = winner
* = after extra time, ( ) = penalty shootout score

== Fixtures and results ==
=== First round ===
20 September 2018	**Dreams FC**	**1–1** (a.e.t.) (**4–2** p)	Pegasus	Mong Kok Stadium
20:00 UTC+8	Martínez 77'	Report	Juninho 8'	Attendance: 614; Referee: Tam Ping Wun
	**Penalties**
	Gondra (penalty scored); Yoon Dong-hun (penalty scored); Gallardo (penalty scored); Leung Tsz Chun (penalty scored)		(penalty scored) Sealy; (penalty scored) Chan Siu Ki; (penalty missed) Kolev; (penalty missed) Sasaki

21 September 2018	**Tai Po**	**5–0**	Hoi King	Mong Kok Stadium
20:00 UTC+8	Sawyer 16', 60', 89'; Chan Siu Kwan 39'; Praes 90+2'	Report		Attendance: 768; Referee: Liu Kwok Man

=== Quarter-finals ===
27 October 2018	**Eastern**	**2–1**	Lee Man	Mong Kok Stadium
14:30 UTC+8	Bleda 35'; Everton 90'	Report	Baek Ji-hoon 45+4'	Attendance: 1,227; Referee: Ng Chiu Kok

27 October 2018	Yuen Long	**1–2**	**R&F**	Tsing Yi Sports Ground
17:30 UTC+8	Tse Wai Chun 87'	Report	Novaković 8'; Leung Nok Hang 82'	Attendance: 476; Referee: Lau Fong Hei

28 October 2018	**Kitchee**	**2–1**	Dreams FC	Mong Kok Stadium
14:30 UTC+8	Lucas 22'; Vadócz 35'	Report	Gondra 82'	Attendance: 1,207; Referee: Tong Kui Sum

28 October 2018	Southern	**0–1**	**Tai Po**	Tsing Yi Sports Ground
17:30 UTC+8		Report	Wong Wai 2'	Attendance: 659; Referee: Ho Wai Sing

=== Semi-finals ===
23 December 2018	**Kitchee**	**3–1**	Eastern	Mong Kok Stadium
16:00 UTC+8	Lucas 8'; Li Ngai Hoi 50'; Lum 58'	Report	Lam Ka Wai 19'	Attendance: 2,466; Referee: Liu Kwok Man

25 December 2018	**Tai Po**	**3–1**	R&F	Mong Kok Stadium
16:00 UTC+8	Sartori 52' (pen.); Lugo 67'; Lee Ka Yiu 90+3'	Report	Bai He 48'	Attendance: 1,933; Referee: Ng Chiu Kok

=== Final ===
26 January 2019	**Kitchee**	**3–2**	Tai Po	Hong Kong Stadium
16:00 UTC+8	Smith 16'; Fernando 45+4'; Fung Hing Wa 75' (o.g.)	Report	Chan Siu Kwan 26'; Lugo 57'	Attendance: 3,399; Referee: Luk Kin Sun
