= 2016–17 Hong Kong FA Cup =

Tournament details
- Country: Hong Kong
- Teams: 11

Final positions
- Champions: Kitchee (4th title)
- Runners-up: South China

Tournament statistics
- Matches played: 10
- Goals scored: 31 (3.1 per match)
- Attendance: 14,691 (1,469 per match)

The 2016–17 Hong Kong FA Cup (officially the 2016–17 CODEX FA Cup for sponsorship reasons) was the 43rd season of Hong Kong FA Cup. It was a knockout competition. Different from previous years, the preliminary round winners of lower league teams no longer enter the competition proper.

== Bracket ==
First round
HKFC	1
**Kitchee**	**5**
**Biu Chun Glory Sky**	**1**
(China) R&F	0
Tai Po	1
**South China**	**5**

Quarter-finals
Pegasus	0
**Kitchee**	**1**
**Southern**	**3**
Biu Chun Glory Sky	1
Rangers	1 (3)
**South China (p)**	**1 (4)**
Yuen Long	0
**Eastern**	**4**

Semi-finals
**Kitchee**	**2**
Southern	1
**South China**	**1**
Eastern	0

Final
**Kitchee**	**2**
South China	1

Bold = winner
* = after extra time, ( ) = penalty shootout score

== Fixtures and results ==
=== First round ===
17 December 2016	Tai Po	**1–5**	**South China**	Sham Shui Po Sports Ground
14:30	Lucas 85'	Report	Lo Kong Wai 7'; Awal 29'; Komazec 48'; Leung Nok Hang 53'; Chan Siu Kwan 69'	Attendance: 1,006; Referee: Liu Kwok Man

18 December 2016	**Biu Chun Glory Sky**	**1–0**	(China) R&F	Sham Shui Po Sports Ground
14:30	Everton 90'	Report		Attendance: 358; Referee: Ho Wai Sing

20 December 2016	HKFC	**1–5**	**Kitchee**	Siu Sai Wan Sports Ground
20:00	Wylde 1'	Report	Rufino 27' (pen.), 60'; Lam Ka Wai 32'; Lum 38'; Tong Kin Man 90+1'	Attendance: 208

=== Quarter-finals ===
13 April 2017	Pegasus	**0–1**	**Kitchee**	Mong Kok Stadium
20:00		Report	Hélio 64'	Attendance: 971; Referee: Liu Kwok Man

15 April 2017	Yuen Long	**0–4**	**Eastern**	Sham Shui Po Sports Ground
14:30		Report	Ju Yingzhi 5'; Leung Chun Pong 18'; Diego 32'; Giovane 42'	Attendance: 997; Referee: Ho Wai Sing

15 April 2017	Rangers	**1–1** (**3–4** p)	**South China**	Mong Kok Stadium
17:30	Denis 45+1'	Report	Komazec 74' (pen.)	Attendance: 1,073; Referee: Tong Kui Sum
	**Penalties**
	Clayton (penalty scored); Law Chun Yan (penalty scored); Wong Chun Hin (penalty scored)		(penalty scored) Carlos; (penalty scored) Chu Siu Kei; (penalty scored) Chan Wai Ho; (penalty scored) Perović

16 April 2017	**Southern**	**3–1**	Biu Chun Glory Sky	Sham Shui Po Sports Ground
14:30	Jiménez 45+1'; Ha 70', 90+3'	Report	Nuñez 77'	Attendance: 516; Referee: Lau Fong Hei

=== Semi-finals ===
29 April 2017	**Kitchee**	**2–1**	Southern	Mong Kok Stadium
15:00	Lum 10'; Tong Kin Man 75'	Report	Wellingsson 73'	Attendance: 1,735; Referee: Ho Wai Sing

30 April 2017	**South China**	**1–0**	Eastern	Mong Kok Stadium
15:00	Kato 5'	Report		Attendance: 2,789; Referee: Tong Kui Sum

=== Final ===
14 May 2017	**Kitchee**	**2–1**	South China	Mong Kok Stadium
15:00	Lam 30'; Sandro 48'	Report	Chu Siu Kei 69'	Attendance: 5,038; Referee: Lau Fong Hei
