= Tang Lok Man =

Hong Kong footballer

Personal information
- Full name: Tang Lok Man
- Date of birth: 15 September 1997 (age 29)
- Place of birth: Hong Kong
- Height: 1.75 m (5 ft 9 in)
- Position: Midfielder

Senior career*
Years	Team	Apps	(Gls)
2016–2017	Biu Chun Glory Sky	1	(0)
2017–2021	Hong Kong Rangers	44	(8)
2022	Lun Lok		
2025–	Ornament		
- * Club domestic league appearances and goals as of 17 May 2026

Tang Lok Man (Chinese: 鄧樂文; born 15 September 1997) is a former Hong Kong professional footballer who played as a midfielder.
