= Jared Lum =

Australian soccer player

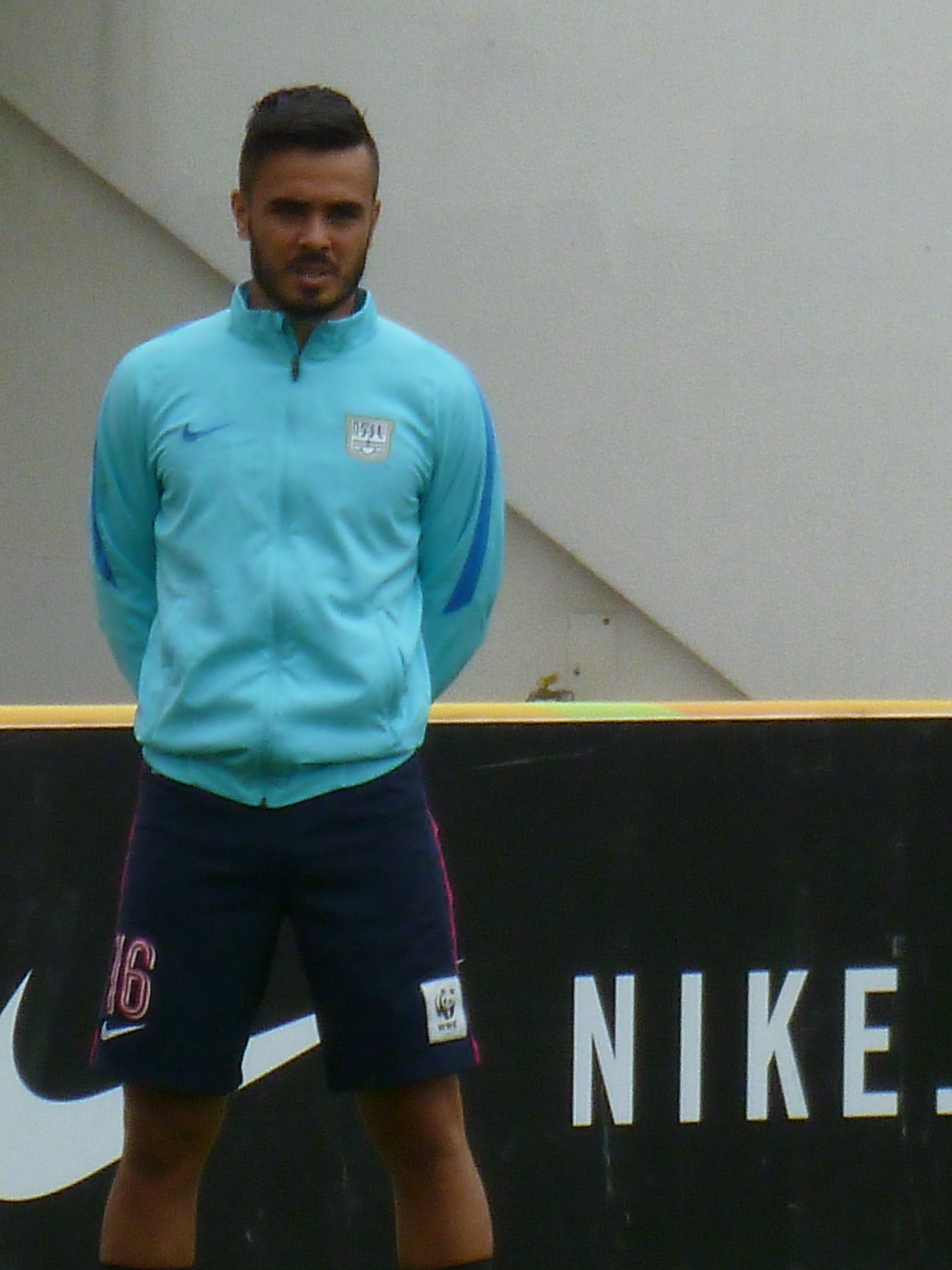

Personal information
- Full name: Jared Christopher Lum
- Date of birth: 19 July 1992 (age 34)
- Place of birth: Sydney, Australia
- Height: 1.76 m (5 ft 9 1/2 in)
- Positions: Central midfielder; right wing

Team information
- Current team: North West Sydney Spirit

Youth career
- Winston Hill Bears
- Hills Brumbies
- Northern Spirit
- Blacktown City
- Sydney Wanderers
- 2008–2009: Sydney FC
- 2009: A.I.S.

Senior career*
Years	Team	Apps	(Gls)
2010	Marconi Stallions		(0)
2011–2013	Sydney FC	0	(0)
2011	→ Bonnyrigg White Eagles (loan)		(4)
2012	→ Sydney United (loan)		(0)
2013–2016	Marconi Stallions	60	(5)
2016–2020	Kitchee	64	(16)
2020	R&F	0	(0)
2020–2022	Eastern	16	(4)
2022	Bonnyrigg White Eagles	4	(0)
2023–	North West Sydney Spirit	50	(2)

International career^{‡}
2007–2009	Australia U-17	18	(2)
2009–2010	Australia U-20	7	(1)
- * Club domestic league appearances and goals as of 23 January 2025 ‡ National team caps and goals as of 30 August 2016

Jared Christopher Lum (Chinese: 林恩許; born 19 July 1992) is an Australian professional soccer player who plays as a midfielder and is currently a free agent. He last played for Hong Kong side Eastern.

== Club career ==
In 2010, Lum joined Marconi Stallions, where he was earmarked as one of the club's most promising players, after graduating from the Australian Institute of Sport.

Lum signed for Hong Kong Premier League club Kitchee on 11 January 2016.

On 26 May 2018, Lum revealed that he had re-signed for another two years.

On 25 June 2020, it was revealed that Lum would leave Kitchee after 4.5 years and would sign for another HKPL club R&F. On 14 October 2020, Lum left the club after his club's withdrawal from the HKPL in the new season.

On 19 November 2020, Lum joined Eastern. He left the club on 9 July 2022.

== International career ==
In May 2017, Lum was called up to the Fiji to play New Caledonia. However, there remained some doubt at the time as to whether he was eligible to play on the basis of his Fijian ancestry. In a later interview, Lum revealed that he was not interested in playing for Fiji as he thought that the football in Fiji was not professional enough.

In March 2020, Lum said in an interview that one of his goals was to represent Hong Kong.

== Personal life ==
Lum's paternal grandmother is a Hongkonger who grew up in Happy Valley and moved to Fiji at age 10, where she met his paternal grandfather who is also ethnically Chinese. His father was born in Fiji and the family emigrated to Sydney when he was two.

On his mother's side, his maternal grandparents are Scottish and moved to Australia in 1969. Lum's parents met when they were attending high school together in Sydney.

Lum married his wife Nelly in 2016 and has two sons.

== Honours ==
=== Club ===
Marconi Stallions

- Waratah Cup: 2010

Kitchee

- Hong Kong Premier League: 2016–17, 2017–18
- Hong Kong Senior Shield: 2016–17, 2018–19
- Hong Kong FA Cup: 2016–17, 2017–18, 2018–19
- Hong Kong Sapling Cup: 2017–18
- HKFA League Cup: 2015–16

=== International ===
Australia

- AFF U-16 Youth Championship: 2008
