= Zé Victor =

Brazilian footballer

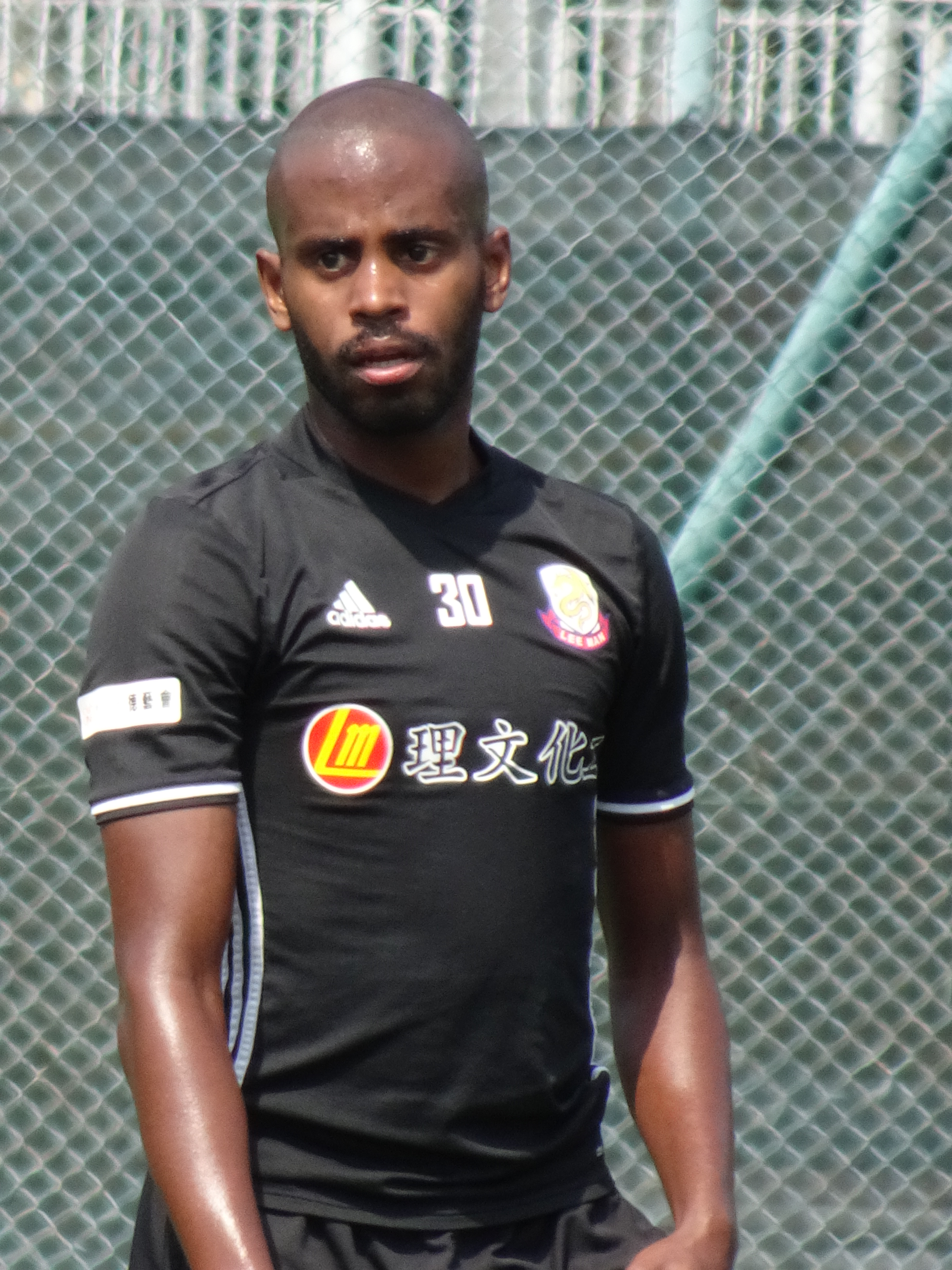

Personal information
- Full name: José Victor de Souza dos Santos
- Date of birth: 8 March 1990 (age 36)
- Place of birth: Triunfo, Rio Grande do Sul, Brazil
- Height: 1.73 m (5 ft 8 in)
- Position: Midfielder

Senior career*
Years	Team	Apps	(Gls)
2010–2016	Friburguense	5	(0)
2013	→ Macaé (loan)	3	(0)
2017	Serra Macaense	0	(0)
2017–2019	Lee Man	22	(1)
2019	→ Hoi King (loan)	8	(0)
- * Club domestic league appearances and goals as of 18:02, 28 April 2019 (UTC)

José Victor de Souza dos Santos (born 8 March 1990), commonly known as Zé Victor, is a Brazilian footballer who currently plays as a midfielder.

== Career statistics ==
=== Club ===
As of 8 March 2019.

Club	Season	League			State League		National Cup		League Cup		Other		Total	
Club	Season	Division	Apps	Goals	Apps	Goals	Apps	Goals	Apps	Goals	Apps	Goals	Apps	Goals
Friburguense	2010	–			1 (Note: Appearances in the Campeonato Carioca)	0	0	0	–		0	0	1	0
Friburguense	2012	Série D	5	0	8	0	0	0	–		0	0	13	0
Friburguense	2013	–			9	0	0	0	–		0	0	9	0
Friburguense	2014	–			7	0	0	0	–		10 (Note: Appearances in the Copa Rio)	0	17	0
Friburguense	2015	–			12	0	0	0	–		4	0	16	0
Friburguense	2016	–			10	1	0	0	–		0	0	10	1
Friburguense	Total		5	0	47	1	0	0	0	0	14	0	66	1
Macaé (loan)	2013	Série C	3	0	0	0	0	0	–		0	0	3	0
Serra Macaense	2017	–			2 (Note: Appearances in the Campeonato Carioca A2)	0	0	0	–		0	0	2	0
Lee Man	2017–18	Hong Kong Premier League	18	1	–		2 (Note: Appearances in the Hong Kong FA Cup)	1	0	0	2 (Note: Appearances in the Hong Kong Senior Shield)	1	22	3
Lee Man	2018–19	Hong Kong Premier League	4	0	–		0	0	1 (Note: Appearances in the Sapling Cup)	0	0	0	5	0
Lee Man	Total		22	1	0	0	2	1	1	0	2	1	27	3
Hoi King (loan)	2018–19	Hong Kong Premier League	8	0	–		1	0	0	0	0	0	9	0
Career total			38	1	49	1	3	1	1	0	16	1	107	4
