= Lucas Silva (footballer, born 1990) =

Brazilian footballer

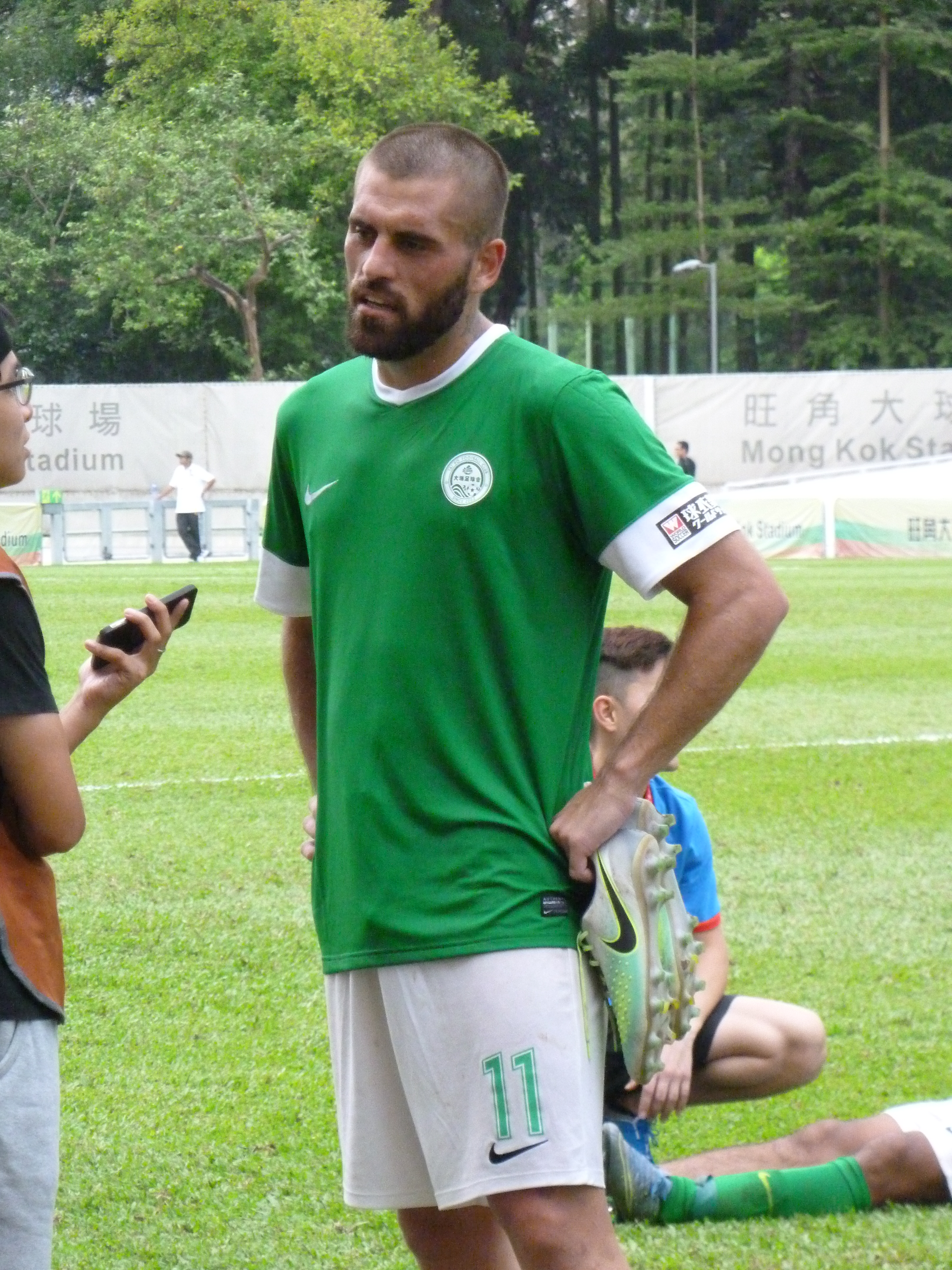
- Lucas in 2016

Personal information
- Full name: Lucas Espindola da Silva
- Date of birth: 6 May 1990 (age 36)
- Place of birth: São Leopoldo, Brazil
- Height: 1.83 m (6 ft 0 in)
- Position: Striker

Youth career
- Aimoré

Senior career*
| Years | Team | Apps | (Gls) |
| 2010–2011 | Paços de Ferreira | 2 | (0) |
| 2011 | → Freamunde (loan) | 14 | (1) |
| 2011 | Veranópolis | | |
| 2012 | Ypiranga | 9 | (0) |
| 2013 | Santa Cruz | 15 | (2) |
| 2013–2014 | Caxias | 8 | (0) |
| 2014–2015 | Aimoré | 11 | (4) |
| 2015 | South China | 4 | (1) |
| 2016 | Aimoré | 3 | (0) |
| 2016 | São Paulo (RS) | 3 | (2) |
| 2016–2017 | Tai Po | 16 | (11) |
| 2017–2019 | Kitchee | 33 | (28) |
| 2020–2021 | Eastern | 19 | (8) |
| 2021–2022 | Aimoré | 18 | (14) |
| 2022 | Brusque | 12 | (0) |
| 2022 | Penang | 11 | (6) |
| 2023 | Sri Pahang | 5 | (0) |
| 2024–2026 | Tai Po | 45 | (31) |
| 2026 | Eastern District | 3 | (0) |
- * Club domestic league appearances and goals as of 11 September 2026

Lucas Espindola da Silva (born 6 May 1990) is a Brazilian professional footballer who plays as a striker.

== Club career ==
On 23 August 2016, Lucas was announced to have signed with Hong Kong Premier League club Tai Po.

On 23 May 2017, Lucas was poached by fellow Hong Kong Club Kitchee. After two and a half seasons at the club, on 20 December 2019, he has left Kitchee due to personal issue.

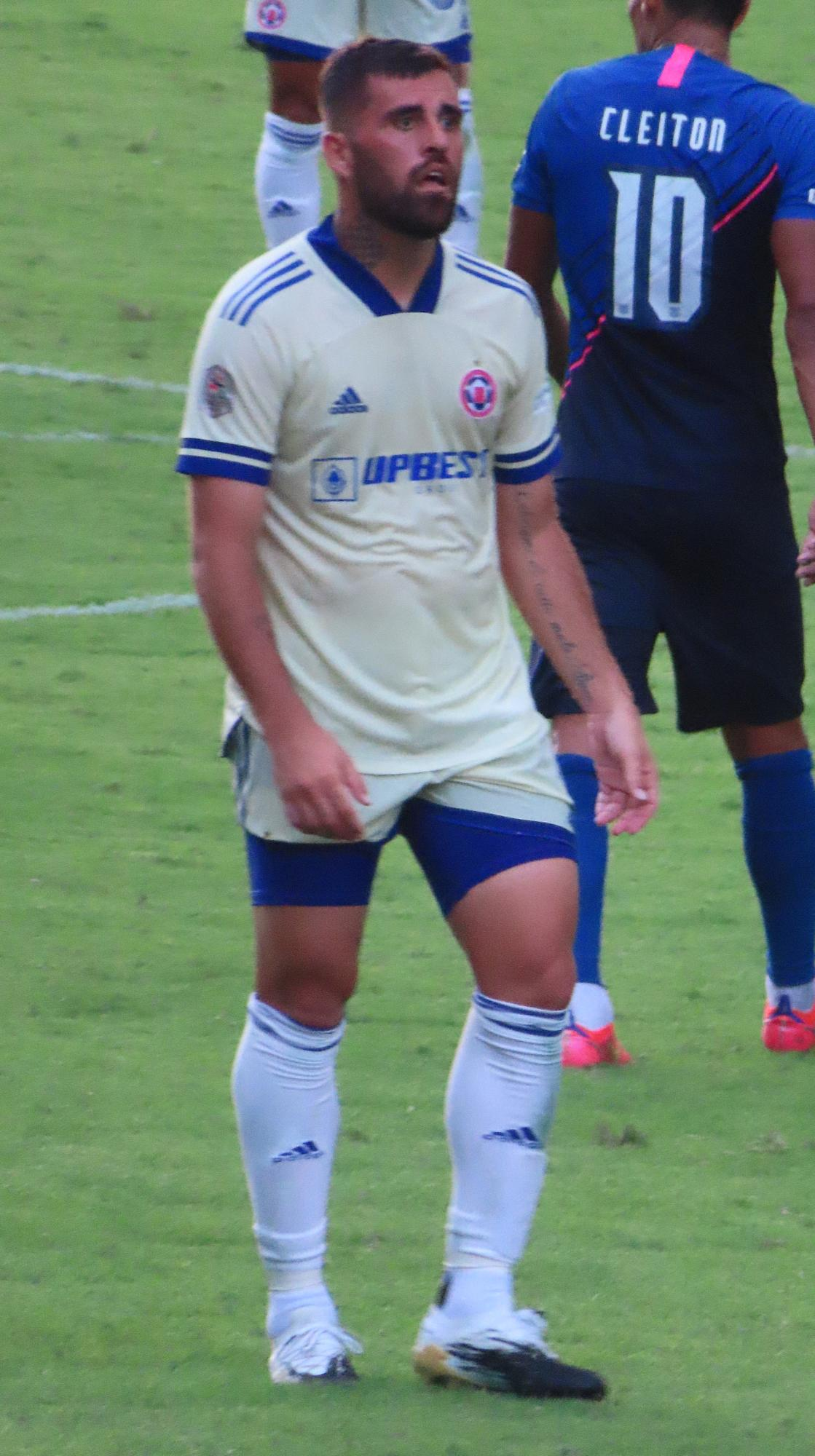
Lucas playing for Eastern in May 2021

On 1 January 2020, Eastern announced that they had signed Lucas with a contract that expires on 30 June 2021.

In early 2022, Lucas Joined Brusque.

On 27 June 2022, Lucas joined Penang.

On 6 January 2023, Lucas signed for another Malaysia Super League side Sri Pahang.

On 5 January 2024, Lucas rejoined Tai Po after seven years. He made an instant impact to the club by scoring six goals in his first three matches, including four goals in the Sapling Cup and two goals in the Hong Kong Premier League.

On 27 July 2026, Lucas joined Eastern District.

== Career statistics ==
Updated on 19 May 2021

| Club | Season | Division | League | | Senior Shield | | League Cup | | FA Cup | | AFC Cup | | Total | |
| Club | Season | Division | Apps | Goals | Apps | Goals | Apps | Goals | Apps | Goals | Apps | Goals | Apps | Goals |
|---|---|---|---|---|---|---|---|---|---|---|---|---|---|---|
| South China | 2015–16 | Hong Kong Premier League | 3 | 1 | 2 | 0 | 2 | 1 | - | | - | | 7 | 2 |
| Tai Po | 2016–17 | Hong Kong Premier League | 14 | 11 | 2 | 0 | - | | 1 | 1 | - | | 17 | 12 |
| Kitchee | 2017–18 | Hong Kong Premier League | 13 | 15 | 2 | 1 | - | | 1 | 0 | - | | 16 | 16 |
| Kitchee | 2018–19 | Hong Kong Premier League | 15 | 12 | 3 | 2 | - | | 1 | 1 | 1 | 0 | 20 | 15 |
| Kitchee | 2019–20 | Hong Kong Premier League | 2 | 1 | 1 | 0 | - | | 4 | 2 | - | | 7 | 3 |
| Eastern | 2019–20 | Hong Kong Premier League | 5 | 3 | - | | - | | - | | - | | 5 | 3 |
| Eastern | 2020–21 | Hong Kong Premier League | 11 | 5 | - | | - | | - | | - | | 11 | 5 |
| | Total | | 63 | 48 | 10 | 3 | 2 | 1 | 7 | 4 | 1 | 0 | 83 | 56 |

== Honours ==
Eastern

- Hong Kong FA Cup: 2019–20
- Hong Kong Sapling Cup: 2020–21

Kitchee

- Hong Kong Premier League: 2017–18, 2019–2020
- Hong Kong Senior Shield: 2018–19
- Hong Kong FA Cup: 2017–18, 2018–19
- Hong Kong Sapling Cup: 2017–18, 2019–20
- Hong Kong Community Cup: 2017, 2018

Tai Po

- Hong Kong Premier League: 2024–25
- Hong Kong Senior Shield: 2025–26
- Hong Kong Sapling Cup: 2016–17
