= Mauricio (footballer, born 1987) =

Brazilian footballer

Personal information
- Full name: Mauricio Correa da Luz
- Date of birth: 7 May 1987 (age 39)
- Place of birth: Porto Alegre, Brazil
- Height: 1.86 m (6 ft 1 in)
- Position: Defender

Team information
- Current team: Sha Tin
- Number: 6

Senior career*
Years	Team	Apps	(Gls)
2011–2012	União Frederiquense		
2012–2013	Tuen Mun	13	(3)
2014–2015	Wong Tai Sin	13	(3)
2015–2016	Hong Kong Rangers	9	(2)
2018	Hong Kong Rangers	5	(1)
2023–2025	Citizen	35	(14)
2025–2026	Supreme FC	8	(3)
2026–	Sha Tin	0	(0)
- * Club domestic league appearances and goals as of 1 April 2018

Mauricio Correa da Luz (Chinese: 莫斯奧; born 7 May 1987), simply known as Mauricio, is a Brazilian professional footballer who plays as a defender for Hong Kong Premier League club Sha Tin.

== Career ==
Born in Brazil, Mauricio arrived in Hong Kong in 2012 after signing with Tuen Mun. After a couple of seasons, he moved to newly promoted Hong Kong Premier League side Wong Tai Sin.

In July 2015, Mauricio was signed by fellow HKPL club Rangers. On 27 September, he fractured his right toe against Pegasus and was ruled out for a minimum of nine weeks. Mauricio made his return on 18 February 2016 in a friendly against Japanese club FC Ryukyu. On 28 February, after scoring an equalizing goal against Kitchee, Mauricio removed his kit during the celebration. Having already received a yellow card earlier in the match, he was given a second yellow and sent off. Rangers director Philip Lee heavily criticized Mauricio for his behaviour and his contract with the club was terminated shortly after.

On 4 January 2018, Mauricio rejoined Rangers after two and a half years away from the club.

== Personal life ==
Mauricio graduated with a bachelor's degree in Physical Education in December 2017.
