= Matt Lam =

Canadian soccer player (born 1989)

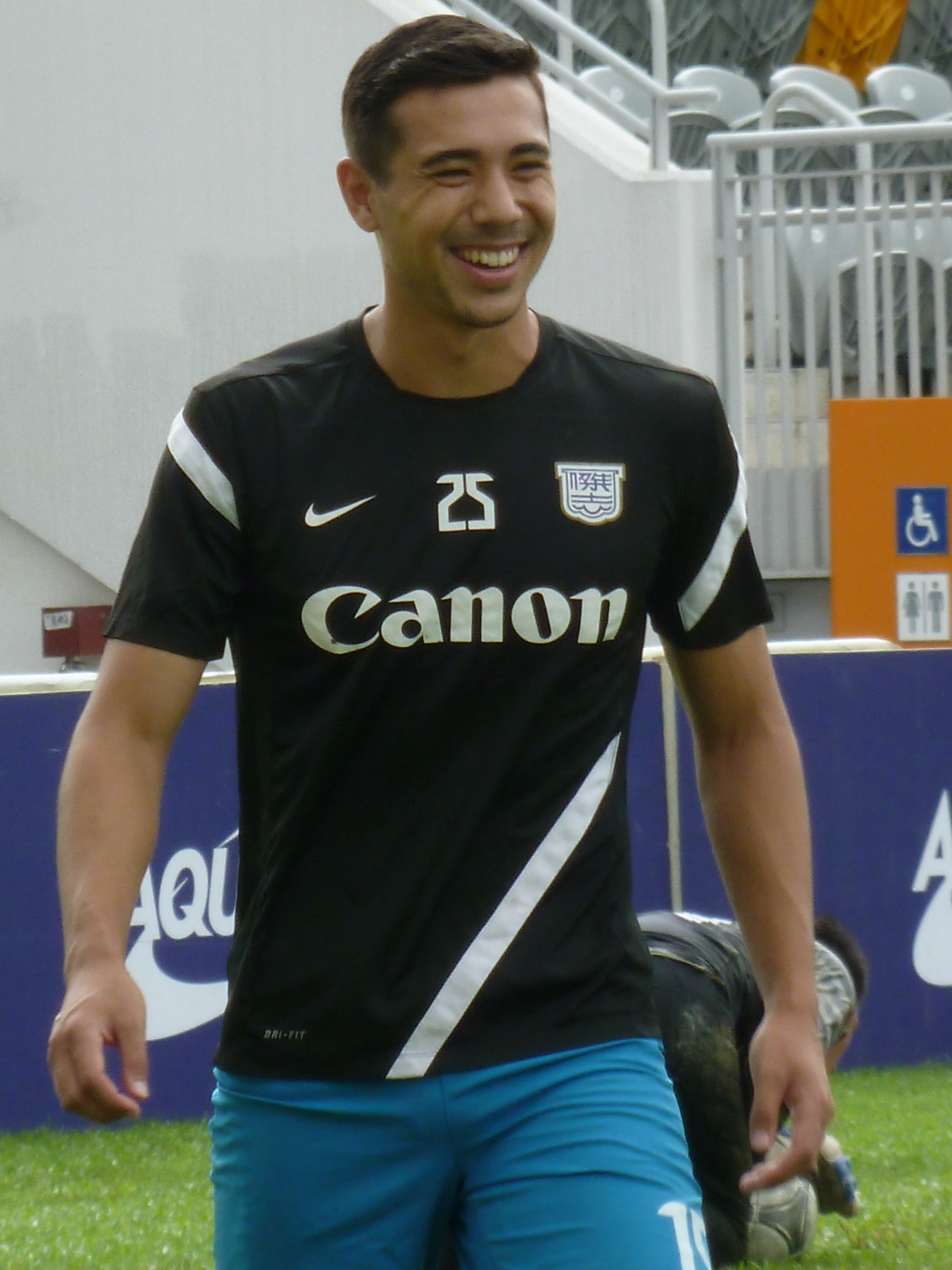

Personal information
- Full name: Matthew Thomas Lam
- Date of birth: 10 September 1989 (age 37)
- Place of birth: Edmonton, Alberta, Canada
- Height: 1.82 m (6 ft 0 in)
- Position: Midfielder

Youth career
- 2006–2008: Ajax
- 2008–2009: Sheffield United

Senior career*
Years	Team	Apps	(Gls)
2009–2010	Croatia Sesvete	1	(0)
2011–2012	FC Edmonton	19	(0)
2011	→ JEF United Chiba (loan)	6	(0)
2013–2019	Kitchee	89	(8)
2018	→ Lee Man (loan)	10	(1)
2019–2020	R&F	13	(2)
2021	Southern	4	(0)
2021–2022	Eastern	3	(0)

International career
2008	Canada U20	1	(0)
- * Club domestic league appearances and goals as of 19 June 2022

Matthew Thomas Lam (Chinese: 林柱機; born 10 September 1989) is a Canadian professional soccer player who plays as a midfielder and is currently a free agent.

== Club career ==
Born in Edmonton, Alberta, Lam played youth soccer in the Netherlands for Ajax and in England for Sheffield United before making his professional debut for Croatian side Croatia Sesvete in October 2009. Lam returned to Canada to play for FC Edmonton in 2010, as the team prepared to join the North American Soccer League for the 2011 season. Lam left FC Edmonton in January 2011, moving on loan to Japanese team JEF United Chiba.

Lam earned one cap for Canada U20 in November 2008.

On 27 February 2013, Lam joined Hong Kong First Division side Kitchee, signing an initial 18-month contract.

On 10 January 2018, fellow Hong Kong Premier League club Lee Man acquired Lam on loan for the remainder of the season.

On 25 May 2019, it was announced that Lam would be leaving the club after six years.

On 19 June 2019, R&F head coach Yeung Ching Kwong revealed that Lam would join the club. He opened his account for the club on 22 December 2019, scoring a brace in a 7–1 win over Rangers. Lam sued the club in November 2020 due to unpaid wages.

On 3 May 2021, it was announced that Lam would join Southern until the end of the season.

On 9 August 2021, it was announced that Lam had joined Eastern.

On 19 June 2022, it was announced that Lam had left Eastern.

== Personal life ==
His father is Hongkongese and his mother is Canadian of Dutch descent. His brother, Sam Lam, is also a professional soccer player.
