= Pablo Gallardo =

Spanish footballer (born 1986)

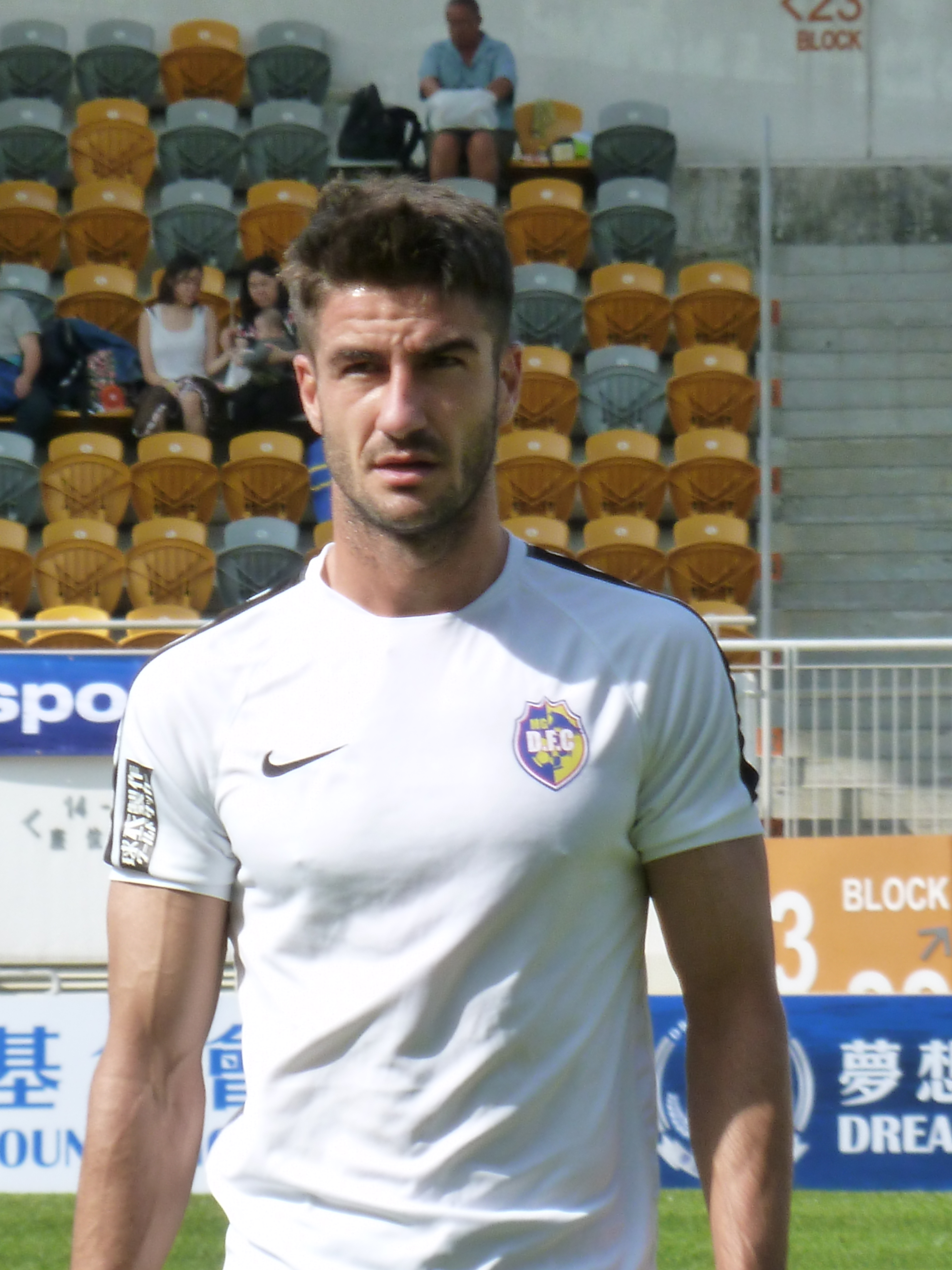

Personal information
- Full name: Pablo José Gallardo Zurera
- Date of birth: 19 February 1986 (age 40)
- Place of birth: Seville, Spain
- Height: 1.84 m (6 ft 0 in)
- Position: Centre-back

Youth career
- 1998–2005: Sevilla

Senior career*
Years	Team	Apps	(Gls)
2005–2009	Sevilla B	88	(1)
2009–2011	Recreativo	9	(0)
2011–2012	Alavés	0	(0)
2012–2013	Badalona	33	(2)
2013–2014	Burgos	26	(2)
2014–2015	Sporting Goa	0	(0)
2015	Arroyo	13	(0)
2015–2016	Metro Gallery	14	(0)
2016	Atlético Kolkata	0	(0)
2017	Palencia	14	(0)
2017–2019	Dreams	36	(3)
2019–2021	Ciudad Lucena	48	(4)
2021–2022	Recreativo	23	(1)
Total		304	(13)

International career
2004–2005	Spain U19	5	(0)
- * Club domestic league appearances and goals

Pablo José Gallardo Zurera (Chinese: 柏保路; born 19 February 1986) is a Spanish former professional footballer who played as a central defender.

== Club career ==
Born in Seville, Andalusia, Gallardo joined Sevilla FC's youth system at the age of 12. He made his senior debut with their reserves, but totalled only 28 Segunda División B games in his first three seasons, achieving promotion in 2007.

Gallardo first appeared in the Segunda División on 30 September 2007, playing the full 90 minutes in a 1–0 away win against SD Eibar. He was first choice in that and the following seasons, with the team being relegated in the latter.

On 6 July 2009, free agent Gallardo signed a two-year contract with neighbouring Recreativo de Huelva also in the second tier. He played just 11 competitive matches during his stint.

Subsequently, Gallardo plied his trade in division three, with Deportivo Alavés (where he suffered a serious hip injury), CF Badalona and Burgos CF. On 30 January 2015, after an unassuming spell in the Indian Super League with SC de Goa, he returned to his country and its third division, with Arroyo CP.

Gallardo spent the 2015–16 campaign in the Hong Kong Premier League, with Metro Gallery FC. In summer 2016 he returned to the Indian top flight, joining three compatriots (including manager José Francisco Molina) at Atlético de Kolkata.

On 26 July 2017, Dreams Sports Club confirmed that they had signed Gallardo. In May 2019, he left the club.

== Career statistics ==
As of match played on 13 May 2018

Club	Season	League			Cup		Other		Total	
Club	Season	Division	Apps	Goals	Apps	Goals	Apps	Goals	Apps	Goals
Sevilla B	2004–05	Segunda División B	5	0	—				5	0
Sevilla B	2005–06	Segunda División B	4	0	—				4	0
Sevilla B	2006–07	Segunda División B	15	1	—		4 (Note: Appearances in Segunda División B play-offs)	0	19	1
Sevilla B	2007–08	Segunda División	28	0	—				28	0
Sevilla B	2008–09	Segunda División	36	0	—				36	0
Sevilla B	Total		88	1	—		4	0	92	1
Recreativo	2009–10	Segunda División	4	0	2	0	—		6	0
Recreativo	2010–11	Segunda División	5	0	0	0	—		5	0
Recreativo	Total		9	0	2	0	—		11	0
Alavés	2011–12	Segunda División B	0	0	0	0	—		0	0
Badalona	2012–13	Segunda División B	33	2	0	0	—		33	2
Burgos	2013–14	Segunda División B	26	2	3	0	—		29	2
Arroyo	2014–15	Segunda División B	13	0	0	0	—		13	0
Metro Gallery	2015–16	Hong Kong Premier League	14	0	6	0	–		20	0
ATK	2016	Indian Super League	0	0	–		–		0	0
Palencia	2016–17	Segunda División B	14	0	0	0	—		14	0
Dreams	2017–18	Hong Kong Premier League	18	2	1	0	–		19	2
Career total			215	7	12	0	4	0	231	7
