= Yanzigang Stadium =

Football venue in Guangzhou, People's Republic of China

Yanzigang Stadium 燕子岗体育场
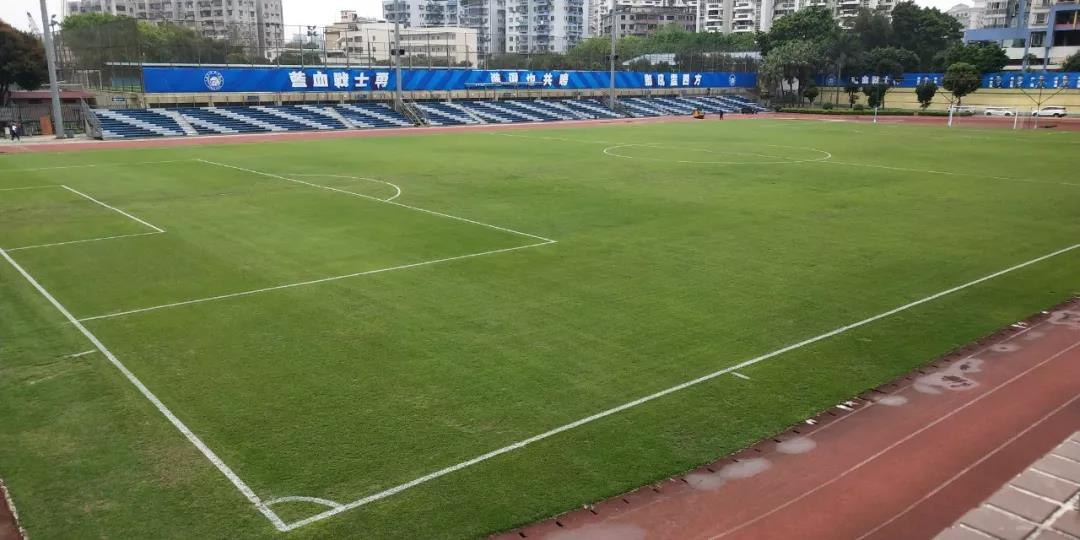
- Interactive map of Yanzigang Stadium 燕子岗体育场
- Location: 251 Jiangyan Rd, Guangzhou, Guangdong, China
- Coordinates: 23.078816°N 113.278614°E
- Owner: Guangzhou People's Government
- Operator: Guangzhou Sports Bureau
- Capacity: 2,000
- Surface: Grass
- Field size: 103 x 68 metres (113 x 74 yards)
- Public transit: Jiangtai Road 2 11; Yangang 11 Guangfo

Construction
- Opened: September 1985

Tenants
- R&F (2017–); Guangzhou Evergrande Reserves (2017–)

Yanzigang Stadium (simplified Chinese: 燕子岗体育场; traditional Chinese: 燕子崗體育場; pinyin: Yānzǐgǎng Tīyùcháng; Jyutping: Jin^{1}zi^{2}gong^{1} Tai^{2}juk^{6}coeng^{4}) is a multi-purpose stadium in Guangzhou, Guangdong, China. It mainly used for campus football league and youth football championships of Guangzhou. It is the current home of Hong Kong Premier League club R&F as well as the Guangzhou Evergrande Reserves.

== History ==
Yanzigang Stadium was opened in September 1985 as the training field for football in the 1987 National Games of China. It also served as a training field for the 1991 FIFA Women's World Cup, 2001 National Games of China and 2010 Asian Games. It was the home stadium of Guangzhou Evergrande youth team for the 2011 China League Two.

Guangzhou Evergrande Reserves moved their home stadium from Lishui Evergrande Training Base to Yanzigang Stadium in 2017. In June, Hong Kong Premier League club R&F received approval to use Yanzigang as their home stadium.

== Facilities ==
The stadium is situated on a 60,207m² complex which includes a 400m track, one 5 a side football pitch, one 7 a side football pitches, one natural grass and one artificial regulation size pitches. In addition, there are tennis courts, table tennis courts, six indoor badminton courts and a basketball court.
