= 2017–18 Hong Kong FA Cup =

Tournament details
- Country: Hong Kong
- Teams: 10

Final positions
- Champions: Kitchee (5th title)
- Runners-up: Tai Po

Tournament statistics
- Matches played: 9
- Goals scored: 35 (3.89 per match)
- Attendance: 11,362 (1,262 per match)

The 2017–18 Hong Kong FA Cup was the 44th edition of the Hong Kong FA Cup. 10 teams entered this edition, with two games played in Round 1 before the Quarter Final stage. The competition was only open to club that participated in the 2017–18 Hong Kong Premier League, with lower division sides entering a separate competition.

The champion received HK$100,000 in prize money and the runners up received HK$40,000. The MVP of the final received a HK$10,000 bonus.

== Bracket ==
First round
(China) R&F	0
**Yuen Long**	**4**
**Lee Man**	**3**
Dreams FC	1

Quarter-finals
**Southern**	**1**
Yuen Long	0
**Tai Po**	**3**
Rangers	0
**Kitchee**	**4**
Lee Man	3
Eastern	1
**Pegasus**	**2**

Semi-finals
Southern	1
**Tai Po (a.e.t.)**	**4***
**Kitchee**	**4**
Pegasus	1

Final
**Kitchee**	**2**
Tai Po	1

Bold = winner
* = after extra time, ( ) = penalty shootout score

== Fixtures and results ==
=== First round ===
30 December 2017	R&F	**0–4**	**Yuen Long**	Yuen Long Stadium
14:30 UTC+8		Report	Juninho 42'; Everton 45'; Ticão 55'; Yiu Ho Ming 63'	Attendance: 668

31 December 2017	**Lee Man**	**3–1**	Dreams FC	Mong Kok Stadium
14:30 UTC+8	Denis 39'; Victor 41'; Pereira 57'	Report	Lali 18'	Attendance: 1159

=== Quarter-finals ===
7 April 2018	**Southern**	**1–0**	Yuen Long	Tseung Kwan O Sports Ground
14:30 UTC+8	Wellingsson 13'	Report		Attendance: 462; Referee: Lau Fong Hei

7 April 2018	**Tai Po**	**3–0**	Rangers	Mong Kok Stadium
17:30 UTC+8	Sartori 63', 74'; Dhiego 90+1'	Report		Attendance: 536; Referee: Tong Kui Sum

8 April 2018	**Kitchee**	**4–3**	Lee Man	Tseung Kwan O Sports Ground
14:30 UTC+8	Forlán 12'; Sandro 23', 84'; Lum 60'	Report	Pereira 7', 90+1' (pen.); Tse Long Hin 55'	Attendance: 724; Referee: Liu Kwok Man

8 April 2018	Eastern	**1–2**	**Pegasus**	Mong Kok Stadium
17:30 UTC+8	Bruno 58'	Report	Mbome 79'; Chan Siu Ki 89'	Attendance: 1,179; Referee: Tam Ping Wun

=== Semi-finals ===
5 May 2018	Southern	**1–4** (a.e.t.)	**Tai Po**	Mong Kok Stadium
15:00 UTC+8	Chan Siu Kwan 71'	Report	Wong Wai 58', 119'; Sartori 105'; Dhiego 108'	Attendance: 1,643; Referee: Tong Kui Sum

6 May 2018	**Kitchee**	**4–1**	Pegasus	Mong Kok Stadium
17:30 UTC+8	Fernando 12', 78'; Akande 87'; Sandro 90+3' (pen.)	Report	Major 20'	Attendance: 1,947; Referee: Chan Ming Siu

=== Final ===
26 May 2018	**Kitchee**	**2–1**	**Tai Po**	Hong Kong Stadium
15:00 UTC+8	Alex 73'; Lum 78'	Report	Sartori 82'	Attendance: 3,044; Referee: Liu Kwok Man
