= Nacho Martínez (footballer) =

Spanish footballer

Personal information
- Full name: Ignacio Martínez Trueba
- Date of birth: 11 April 1990 (age 36)
- Place of birth: Santander, Spain
- Height: 1.85 m (6 ft 1 in)
- Position: Forward

Team information
- Current team: Escobedo
- Number: 9

Youth career
- Real Racing Club

Senior career*
Years	Team	Apps	(Gls)
2009–2010	Pontejos	4	(3)
2010–2013	Guarnizo	97	(31)
2013–2014	Laredo	34	(16)
2014–2015	Petrolero	32	(7)
2015–2016	Ciclón	27	(4)
2016–2017	Conquense	31	(14)
2017–2019	Dreams	32	(7)
2019	Ciudad Lucena	16	(2)
2020	Recambios Colón	8	(1)
2020–2021	Gimnástica de Torrelavega	24	(9)
2021–2022	Escobedo	27	(17)
2022–2023	Atlético Albericia	27	(11)
2023–	Escobedo	30	(10)
- * Club domestic league appearances and goals as of 12 October 2024

Ignacio Martínez Trueba (born 11 April 1990), commonly known as Nacho Martínez is a Spanish professional footballer who plays as a forward for Escobedo.
