= Joaquín García (footballer, born 1986) =

Spanish footballer

Joaquín
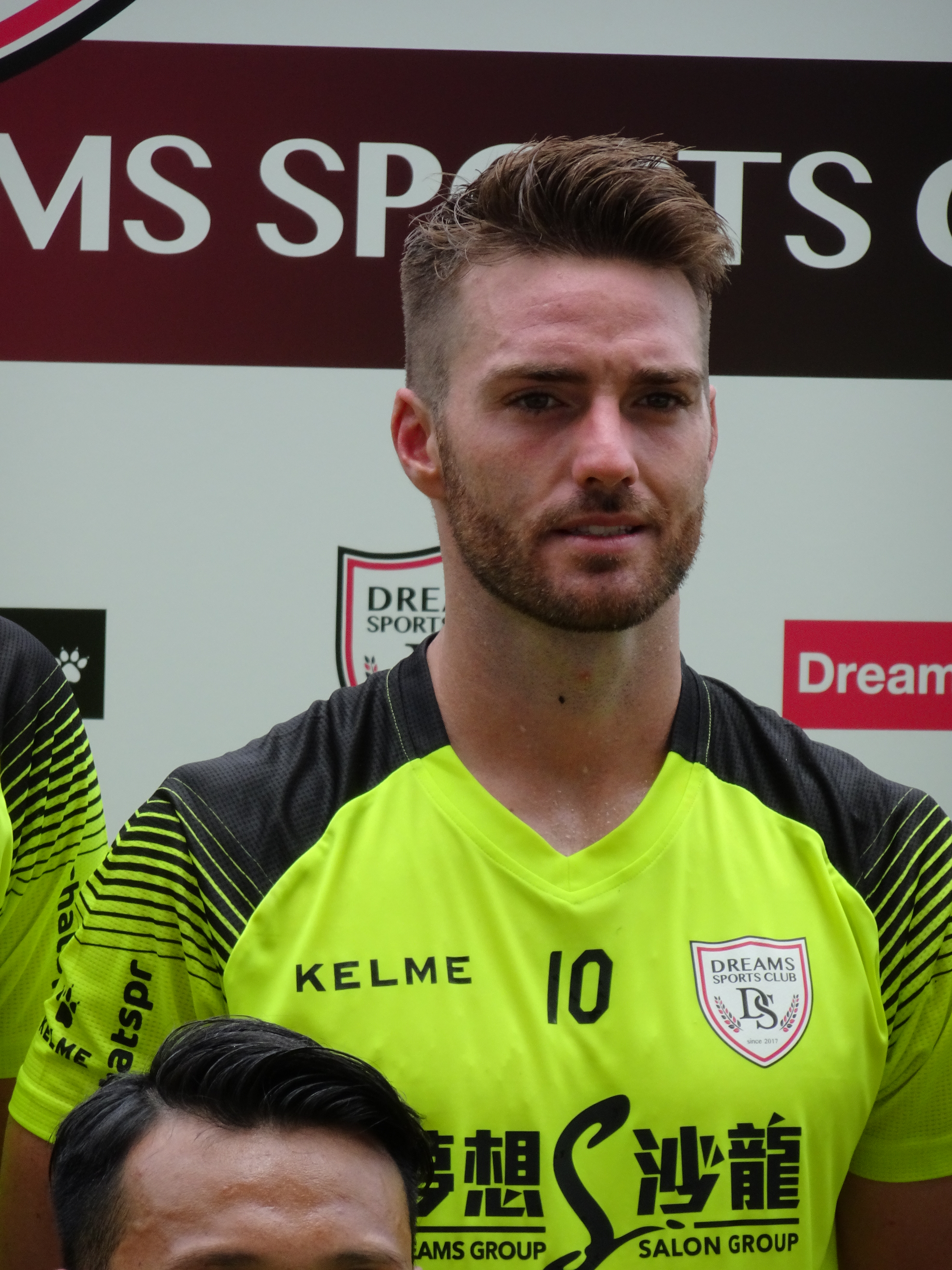

Personal information
- Full name: Joaquín García Barbero
- Date of birth: 12 January 1986 (age 40)
- Place of birth: Barcelona, Spain
- Height: 1.74 m (5 ft 8 1/2 in)
- Position: Midfielder

Youth career
- Gramenet

Senior career*
Years	Team	Apps	(Gls)
2005–2009	Gramenet B		
2009–2011	Gramenet	67	(7)
2011–2014	Badalona	84	(7)
2014–2015	Cornellà	4	(0)
2015–2016	Ethnikos Achna	12	(0)
2016	Europa		
2016–2017	Huércal-Overa		
2017	Samut Prakan		
2017–2019	Dreams	19	(2)
2019	Churchill Brothers	0	(0)
2020	Lorca	2	(0)
2020–2021	Montañesa	2	(0)
- * Club domestic league appearances and goals

Joaquín García Barbero (born 12 January 1986), simply known as Joaquín, is a Spanish former footballer.

== Football career ==
Born in Barcelona, Catalonia, Joaquín graduated with UDA Gramenet's youth setup, and made his senior debuts with the reserves in 2005. He played his first match with the main squad on 15 March 2009, coming on as a second half substitute in a 0–1 home loss against Ontinyent CF in the Segunda División B.

In the 2011 summer, after Gramenet's relegation, Joaquín moved to fellow league team CF Badalona. He appeared regularly for the club during the course of three seasons, and joined UE Cornellà also in the third level on 7 August 2014.

On 3 January 2015, after appearing rarely, Joaquín moved abroad for the first time in his career, joining Cypriot First Division side Ethnikos Achna. He played his first match as a professional on 2 February, starting in a 0–2 home loss against Apollon Limassol.

On 26 July 2017, Joaquín was announced as a player for Hong Kong Premier League club Dreams.
