= Hong Kong Sapling =

King Fung
- Full name: Branded Name: King Fung Football Club (景峰足球會); Legal Registration Name: Hong Kong Sapling Football Club Limited (香港港菁足球會有限公司)
- Founded: 2011; 15 years ago (as Hong Kong Sapling); 2019; 7 years ago (as King Fung)
- Dissolved: 2020; 6 years ago
- Owner: Lai Chin Wai
- CEO: Leung Chi Kui
Home colours	Away colours

Hong Kong Sapling Football Club (Chinese: 香港港菁足球會) was a Hong Kong football club, which since 2020 does not compete in the Hong Kong football league system.

== History ==
On 11 August 2011, Mutual withdrew from the Hong Kong First Division League due to financial problems. The Hong Kong Football Association then decided to form a team for training youngsters for the 2013 East Asian Games, as well as to replace Mutual. The club was named as Hong Kong Sapling, but was dissolved in 2012.

In the run up to the 2016–17 season, Metro Gallery were forced to voluntarily relegate to the First Division due to financial difficulties. Hong Kong Sapling were reformed in order to fill the void left by Metro Gallery and were able to secure funding from two sponsors, Biu Chun and GlorySky Group, competing under the name Biu Chun Glory Sky until the end of the season.

In the summer of 2017, the club was taken over by former Birmingham City board member Ryan Yeung and the club were renamed as Dreams FC.

During the latter part of the 2018–19 season, Dreams ran into financial arrears and it appeared that their future in the HKPL was uncertain. Despite this, CEO Leung Chi Kui issued a statement claiming that the club had retained two thirds of their players and would continue to participate in the 2019–20 season. However, on 11 July 2019, Dreams decided to self-relegate due to lack of funds, citing an inability to fulfill a requirement by the HKFA for each HKPL club to submit a seven figure deposit ahead of the season. However, HKFA disputed the claim entirely the next day via press release.

In the 2019–20 season, the club were renamed as King Fung.

On 16 November 2020, the club confirmed that they would withdraw from local competitions for two seasons following a FIFA imposed transfer ban on the club. The ban came as a result of a successful arbitration case by former player Joaquín who had sued the club for salary arrears during the 2018–19 season. In addition, FIFA demanded that the club pay $800,000 HKD in compensation to Joaquín.

== Name history ==
- 2011–2012: Hong Kong Sapling (港菁)
- 2016–2017: Biu Chun Glory Sky (標準灝天)
- 2017–2019: Dreams FC (夢想FC)
- 2019–2020: King Fung (景峰)
