= 2019–20 Hong Kong Premier League =

Hong Kong Premier League
- Season: 2019–20
- Dates: 30 August 2019 – 11 October 2020
- Champions: Kitchee
- Relegated: Tai Po; Yuen Long
- AFC Champions League: Kitchee
- AFC Cup: Eastern; Lee Man
- Matches: 60
- Goals: 214 (3.57 per match)
- Top goalscorer: (Ivory Coast) Serges Déblé (Brazil) Igor Sartori (6 goals)
- Biggest home win: R&F 8–0 Yuen Long (19 October 2019)
- Biggest away win: R&F 0–4 Eastern (14 September 2019)
- Highest scoring: R&F 8–0 Yuen Long (19 October 2019); Yuen Long 4–4 Rangers (30 November 2019); Rangers 1–7 R&F (22 December 2019)
- Longest winning run: 4 matches Eastern; R&F
- Longest winless run: 9 matches Yuen Long
- Longest losing run: 3 matches Tai Po; Pegasus; Yuen Long; Rangers
- Highest attendance: 2,772; Kitchee 5–0 Happy Valley (30 August 2019)
- Lowest attendance: 240; Rangers 1–7 R&F (22 December 2019)
- Total attendance: 34,903
- Average attendance: 793

The 2019–20 Hong Kong Premier League (also known as the BOC Life Hong Kong Premier League for sponsorship reasons) was the 6th season of the Hong Kong Premier League, the top division of Hong Kong football.

Kitchee became the champions for the fourth time. Igor Sartori and Serges Déblé were the joint top goalscorers with 6 goals. Tai Po and Yuen Long self-relegated to the Hong Kong First Division.

== Effects of the 2019–20 coronavirus pandemic ==
Due to the 2020 coronavirus pandemic in Hong Kong, the HKFA announced on 16 April 2020 that all the HKPL matches after 18 March 2020 will be postponed and the 2019–20 season will be resumed not earlier than mid-August, with an aim to finish by early November this year. No relegation will occur this year.

On 30 April 2020, HKFA announced Rangers, Yuen Long and Pegasus announced their withdrawal from the remaining matches this season. Their eligibility for the HKPL next season will remain secure, and the league standing will be adjusted according to the Article D.8 of Competition Regulations: “If any Participating Club ceases to participate in the Competition during the course of the season, the record of the matches of the Competition in which its playing team has participated shall be expunged from the league table”.

On 29 May 2020, Tai Po announced that they, too, would drop out from the restart of the season. This means that there were only 6 teams left in the remaining of the season.

On 17 September 2020, HKFA announced that the season will resume on 19 September 2020 and end on 11 October 2020.

== Teams ==
A total of 10 teams contest the league, including eight sides from the 2018–19 Hong Kong Premier League and two promoted from the 2018–19 Hong Kong First Division, replacing relegated Dreams FC and Hoi King. On 11 July 2019, Dreams FC decided to self-relegate to the Hong Kong First Division due to lack of funds. The Hong Kong Football Association held an emergency board meeting on the 15th, during which the board voted to allow Dreams FC to relegate into the First Division and invite Rangers into the HKPL.

Club	Founded	Position Last Season
Tai Po	2002	1st
(China) R&F	2016	2nd
Southern	2002	3rd
Kitchee	1931	4th
Eastern	1932	5th
Pegasus	2008	6th
Yuen Long	1958	7th
Lee Man	2017	9th
Happy Valley	1950	1st in First Division
Rangers	1958	3rd in First Division

- Pink denotes a newly promoted club entering the league this year.

=== Stadia and locations ===
Location of R&F.
Locations of the Hong Kong based teams.

Primary venues used in the Hong Kong Premier League:

Southern & Kitchee	Tai Po	Lee Man
Mong Kok Stadium	Tai Po Sports Ground	Sham Shui Po Sports Ground
Capacity: 6,769	Capacity: 3,200	Capacity: 2,194
(China) R&F	Happy Valley	Yuen Long
Yanzigang Stadium	Hammer Hill Road Sports Ground	Yuen Long Stadium
Capacity: 1,000	Capacity: 2,200	Capacity: 5,000
Eastern	Pegasus	Rangers
Tseung Kwan O Sports Ground	Hong Kong Stadium	Tuen Mun Tang Shiu Kin Sports Ground
Capacity: 3,500	Capacity: 40,000	Capacity: 2,200

=== Personnel and kits ===
Team	President	Head coach	Captain	Kit Manufacturer	Kit sponsor
Eastern	Lam Kin Ming	(Hong Kong) Lee Chi Kin	(Hong Kong) Leung Chun Pong	Adidas	Topeast
Happy Valley	Chen Zhishi	(Hong Kong) Pau Ka Yiu	(Bosnia and Herzegovina) Mahir Karić	Adidas	World Electronic Sports Games
Kitchee	Ken Ng	(Hong Kong) Chu Chi Kwong	(Hong Kong) Huang Yang	Nike	edps, Lippo Group
Pegasus	Steven Lo	(Hong Kong) Man Pei Tak	(Hong Kong) Chan Siu Ki	Adidas	RedMR Cosmos
Lee Man	Norman Lee	(Hong Kong) Chan Hiu Ming	(Hong Kong) Fernando Recio	Adidas	Lee & Man Chemical
Rangers	Peter Mok	(Hong Kong) Chiu Chung Man (Hong Kong) Wong Chin Hung (Hong Kong) Lai Ka Fai	(Brazil) Tomas	Kelme	Bjorn Hendal Sweden
Southern	Matthew Wong	(Pakistan) Zesh Rehman	(Hong Kong) Tse Tak Him	Macron	Isuzu
Tai Po	Gary Choy	(Serbia) Davor Berber	(Brazil) Dudu	Nike	Lippo Limited
Yuen Long	Wilson Wong	(Hong Kong) Kwok Kar Lok	(Hong Kong) Fábio Lopes	Kelme	PanaShop
(China) R&F	(China) Huang Shenghua	(Hong Kong) Yeung Ching Kwong	(Hong Kong) Roberto	Ucan	R&F Properties

=== Managerial changes ===
Team	Outgoing manager	Manner of departure	Date of vacancy	Position in table	Incoming manager	Date of appointment
Yuen Long	(Hong Kong) Kwok Kar Lok	End of Contract	30 May 2019	Pre-season	(Hong Kong) Chan Man Chun	3 August 2019
Tai Po	(Hong Kong) Lee Chi Kin	Mutual Consent	26 June 2019	Pre-season	(Hong Kong) Kwok Kar Lok (Hong Kong) Fung Hoi Man	29 July 2019
Kitchee	(Hong Kong) Chu Chi Kwong	Change of Role	3 July 2019	Pre-season	(Bosnia and Herzegovina) Blaž Slišković	3 July 2019
Pegasus	(Hong Kong) Chan Ho Yin	End of Contract	16 July 2019	Pre-season	(Hong Kong) Man Pei Tak	16 July 2019
Eastern	(Latvia) Andrejs Štolcers	Change of Role	17 July 2019	Pre-season	(Hong Kong) Lee Chi Kin	17 July 2019
Tai Po	(Hong Kong) Kwok Kar Lok	Resigned	6 November 2019	6th		
Tai Po	(Hong Kong) Fung Hoi Man	Change of Role	16 January 2020	6th	(Serbia) Davor Berber	16 January 2020
Yuen Long	(Hong Kong) Chan Man Chun	Change of Role	1 February 2020	9th	(Hong Kong) Kwok Kar Lok	1 February 2020
Southern	(Hong Kong) Cheng Siu Chung	Mutual Consent	16 March 2020	3rd	(Hong Kong) Pui Ho Wang (Hong Kong) Cristiano Cordeiro	16 March 2020
Kitchee	(Bosnia and Herzegovina) Blaž Slišković	Change of Role	23 March 2020	3rd	(Hong Kong) Chu Chi Kwong	23 March 2020
Yuen Long	(Hong Kong) Kwok Kar Lok	Mutual Consent	2 May 2020	9th		
Southern	(Hong Kong) Pui Ho Wang (Hong Kong) Cristiano Cordeiro	End of Caretaker Roles	16 May 2020	3rd	(Pakistan) Zesh Rehman	16 May 2020

=== Foreign players ===
The number of foreign players is restricted to seven (including one Asian player and one Chinese player) per team, with no more than four on pitch during matches.

Club	Player 1	Player 2	Player 3	Player 4	Player 5	Asian Player	Chinese Player	Former/Unregistered Players
Eastern	(Brazil) Everton	(Brazil) João Emir	(Brazil) Eduardo Praes	(Brazil) Lucas Silva		(Chinese Taipei) Chen Hao-wei		(Brazil) Fernando (Brazil) Jean Moser
Happy Valley	(Brazil) Luciano							(Bosnia and Herzegovina) Mahir Karić (Brazil) Mikael (Serbia) Igor Miović (Serbia) Marko Rajković (Spain) Edu Cruz (Spain) Manuel Gavilán
Kitchee	(Brazil) Cleiton	(Brazil) Tomas	(Brazil) Wellingsson	(Serbia) Nikola Komazec	(South Korea) Park Jun-heong	(Spain) Manuel Gavilán		(Brazil) Fernando (Brazil) Paulo César (Brazil) Lucas Silva (Hungary) Krisztián Vadócz (Spain) Manuel Bleda
Lee Man	(Argentina) Jonathan Acosta	(Brazil) Gil	(France) Michaël N'dri	(Portugal) Bruno Pinheiro	(Ukraine) Serhiy Shapoval			(Brazil) Diogo Rangel
Southern	(Brazil) Stefan Pereira	(Japan) Kota Kawase	(Japan) Shu Sasaki			(Pakistan) Zesh Rehman		(Argentina) Gabriel Méndez (Australia) Travis Major (Brazil) Dhiego Martins (Brazil) Ticão (Portugal) Pedro Mendes (Serbia) Nikola Komazec
(China) R&F	(Brazil) Dudu	(Brazil) Igor Sartori	(Burkina Faso) Adama Guira	(Ivory Coast) Serges Déblé	(Ecuador) Daniel Angulo	(China) Zhou Yuchen		(Brazil) Tiago Leonço (Republic of the Congo) Emmerson (China) Chen Zirong (China) Fu Yunlong (China) Ji Xiangzheng
Pegasus								(Argentina) Gabriel Méndez (Australia) Michael Glassock (Australia) Charles Lokolingoy (Brazil) Juninho (Brazil) David Lazari (Brazil) Jean Moser (Cameroon) Mahama Awal (Japan) Shu Sasaki (Spain) Marcos Gondra (Spain) Jorge Ortí
Tai Po								(Australia) Benjamin Van Meurs (Brazil) Paulo César (Brazil) Dudu (Brazil) Michel Lugo (Serbia) Željko Kuzmić (South Korea) Kim Min-ki (South Korea) Kim Seung-yong
Yuen Long								(Brazil) Juninho (Brazil) Katê (Brazil) Kessi (Brazil) Mikael (Brazil) Maicon Santana (Chinese Taipei) Wang Ruei
Rangers								(Argentina) Leandro Bazán (Argentina) Diego Cañete (Brazil) Tomas (Brazil) Stefan Pereira (China) Ji Xiangzheng (Paraguay) Pablo Leguizamón

== League table ==
Pos	Team	Pld	W	D	L	GF	GA	GD	Pts	Qualification or relegation
1	Kitchee (C)	10	6	2	2	25	10	+15	20	Qualification for AFC Champions League group stage
2	Eastern	10	6	1	3	16	8	+8	19	Qualification for AFC Cup group stage
3	(China) R&F (D)	10	5	3	2	21	15	+6	18	Withdrew from league system, club folded (Note: R&F withdrew from the league system after the end of the season and folded.)
4	Lee Man	10	5	1	4	16	14	+2	16	Qualification for AFC Cup group stage
5	Southern	10	2	4	4	15	21	−6	10	
6	Happy Valley	10	0	1	9	6	31	−25	1	
7	Pegasus (D)	0	0	0	0	0	0	0	0	Withdrew, record expunged (Note: Pegasus and Rangers withdrew from the league due to the 2020 coronavirus pandemic in Hong Kong, and their records were expunged.)
8	Rangers (D)	0	0	0	0	0	0	0	0	Withdrew, record expunged
9	Tai Po (D, R)	0	0	0	0	0	0	0	0	Withdrew, record expunged Relegation to Hong Kong First Division League (Note: Tai Po and Yuen Long withdrew from the league due to the 2020 coronavirus pandemic in Hong Kong, and their records were expunged. On 12 June 2020, it was announced that they would self-relegate due to lack of funds.)
10	Yuen Long (D, R)	0	0	0	0	0	0	0	0	Withdrew, record expunged Relegation to Hong Kong First Division League

Source: Hong Kong Football Association
Rules for classification: 1) Points; 2) Head-to-head points; 3) Head-to-head goal difference; 4) Head-to-head goals scored; 5) Goal difference; 6) Goals scored; 7) Fair-play points; 8) Drawing lots (Play-off if the winner has to be decided).
(C) Champions; (D) Disqualified; (R) Relegated

=== Head to head ===
Home \ Away	ELL	KIT	R&F	LEE	KCS	HVA	TPO	BCR	BYL	PEG
Eastern	—	2–1	0–0	2–1	0–1	4–0	~~3–3~~			
Kitchee	3–1	—	0–0	2–1	1–1	5–0			~~2–2~~	~~2–1~~
R&F	0–4	2–3	—	5–1	2–2	2–0		~~5–0~~	~~8–0~~	
Lee Man	1–0	2–1	0–1	—	2–2	2–0	~~4–1~~	~~1–0~~		~~4–2~~
Southern	0–1	1–5	3–4	0–4	—	1–1	~~2–1~~	~~3–1~~	~~1–1~~	
Happy Valley	1–2	0–4	2–5	1–2	1–4	—			~~1–1~~	~~3–3~~
Tai Po		~~1–1~~	~~1–4~~		~~2–4~~		—	~~3–2~~		
Rangers		~~1–1~~	~~1–7~~			~~0–1~~		—		
Yuen Long	~~1–2~~					~~0–0~~	~~1–3~~	~~4–4~~	—	
Pegasus	~~0–1~~	~~0–3~~			~~2–2~~		~~1–1~~	~~1–2~~	~~2–1~~	—

Source: HKFA
Legend: Blue = home team win; Yellow = draw; Red = away team win.

== Positions by round ==
To preserve chronological evolvements, any postponed matches are not included to the round at which they were originally scheduled, but added to the full round they were played immediately afterwards. For example, if a match is scheduled for round 7, but then played between rounds 8 and 9, it will be added to the standings for round 8.

Team ╲ Round	1	2	3	4	5	6	7	8	9	10	11	12	13	14	15
Kitchee	1	4	3	5	5	4	5	5	4	3	4	3	1	2	1
Eastern	5	1	1	2	1	2	1	4	5	5	2	1	2	1	2
R&F	2	5	6	4	2	1	2	1	1	1	3	2	3	3	3
Lee Man	3	2	4	3	4	3	3	2	2	4	1	4	4	4	4
Southern	4	3	2	1	3	6	4	3	3	2	5	5	5	5	5
Happy Valley	10	6	5	6	7	8	9	8	8	8	6	6	6	6	6
Tai Po	9	8	9	7	6	5	6	6	6	6	x	x	x	x	x
Pegasus	7	7	10	9	9	7	7	7	7	7	x	x	x	x	x
Rangers	8	10	7	8	9	9	8	9	9	10	x	x	x	x	x
Yuen Long	6	9	8	10	10	10	10	10	10	9	x	x	x	x	x

Leader
Withdrew

Source: Hong Kong Football Association website

== Fixtures and results ==
=== Round 1 ===
30 August 2019	Kitchee	5–0	Happy Valley	Mong Kok, Kowloon
20:00 (UTC+8)	Bleda 16'; Lucas Silva 28'; Cleiton 38'; Fernando 49' (pen.); Wellingsson 71'	Report		Stadium: Mong Kok Stadium; Attendance: 2,772; Referee: Tam Ping Wun

31 August 2019	Tai Po	1–4	R&F	Tai Po, New Territories
14:30 (UTC+8)	Sandro 41' (pen.)	Report	Leonço 38'; Giovane 57'; Zhi-Gin Lam 77'; Leung Nok Hang 83'	Stadium: Tai Po Sports Ground; Attendance: 969; Referee: Ng Chiu Kok

31 August 2019	Yuen Long	1–2	Eastern	Yuen Long, New Territories
17:30 (UTC+8)	Tsang Tsz Hin 70'	Report	Clayton 83'; Moser 89'	Stadium: Yuen Long Stadium; Attendance: 791; Referee: Ho Wai Sing

31 August 2019	Southern	3–1	Rangers	Mong Kok, Kowloon
20:00 (UTC+8)	Ha 39', 42'; Chan Kwong Ho 84'	Report	Au Yeung Yiu Chung 90+3'	Stadium: Mong Kok Stadium; Attendance: 667; Referee: Lau Fong Hei

1 September 2019	Lee Man	4–2	Pegasus	Cheung Sha Wan, Kowloon
14:30 (UTC+8)	Recio 36'; N'dri 45+1', 56', 90+2'	Report	Lokolingoy 26'; Gondra 65'	Stadium: Sham Shui Po Sports Ground; Attendance: 991; Referee: Luk Kin Sun

=== Round 2 ===
14 September 2019	R&F	0–4	Eastern	Guangzhou, China
14:30 (UTC+8)		Report	Diego Eli 45+1'; Clayton 86'; Everton 87'; Chung Wai Keung 90+3'	Stadium: Yanzigang Stadium; Attendance: 440; Referee: Luk Kin Sun

14 September 2019	Kitchee	2–2	Yuen Long	Mong Kok, Kowloon
17:30 (UTC+8)	Lum 44'; Bleda 59'	Report	Wang Ruei 56'; Tsang Tsz Hin 69'	Stadium: Mong Kok Stadium; Attendance: 1,546; Referee: Tang Hing Fu

15 September 2019	Rangers	0–1	Happy Valley	Tuen Mun, New Territories
14:30 (UTC+8)		Report	Gavilán 57'	Stadium: Tuen Mun Tang Shiu Kin Sports Ground; Attendance: 432; Referee: Ho Wai Sing

15 September 2019	Lee Man	2–2	Southern	Cheung Sha Wan, Kowloon
14:30 (UTC+8)	N'dri 27' (pen.); Gil 50'	Report	Major 3'; Beto 90+4'	Stadium: Sham Shui Po Sports Ground; Attendance: 972; Referee: Tam Ping Wun

16 September 2019	Pegasus	1–1	Tai Po	So Kon Po, Hong Kong Island
20:00 (UTC+8)	Lokolingoy 90+5'	Report	Sandro 65'	Stadium: Hong Kong Stadium; Attendance: 635; Referee: Yu Kin Fung

=== Round 3 ===
28 September 2019	Pegasus	1–2	Rangers	So Kon Po, Hong Kong Island
14:30 (UTC+8)	Wong Chun Ho 84'	Report	Cañete 47'; Bazán 86'	Stadium: Hong Kong Stadium; Attendance: 533; Referee: Tang Hing Fu

29 September 2019	Southern	1–1	Yuen Long	Mong Kok, Kowloon
14:30 (UTC+8)	Major 87'	Report	Mikael 45'	Stadium: Mong Kok Stadium; Attendance: 978; Referee: Luk Kin Sun

29 September 2019	Eastern	3–3	Tai Po	Tseung Kwan O, New Territories
17:30 (UTC+8)	Fung Hing Wa 59'; Everton 62', 79'	Report	Sandro 17' (pen.), 32'; Nakamura 86'	Stadium: Tseung Kwan O Sports Ground; Attendance: 893; Referee: Tam Ping Wun

7 December 2019	R&F	2–0	Happy Valley	Guangzhou, China
14:30 (UTC+8)	Sartori 10', 90+4'	Report		Stadium: Yanzigang Stadium; Attendance: 336; Referee: Law Pik Chi

18 March 2020	Lee Man	2–1	Kitchee	Tseung Kwan O, New Territories
14:30 (UTC+8)	N'dri 88' (pen.), 90+3'	Report	Komazec 66'	Stadium: Tseung Kwan O Sports Ground; Attendance: 0 Referee: Tam Ping Wun

=== Round 4 ===
10 March 2020	Southern	1–5	Kitchee	Tseung Kwan O, New Territories
14:30 (UTC+8)	Major 87'	Report	Chan Kong Pan 14' (o.g.); Shinichi Chan 49'; Park Jun-heong 60'; Bleda 62', 74'	Stadium: Tseung Kwan O Sports Ground; Attendance: 0 Referee: Tam Ping Wun

=== Round 5 ===
19 October 2019	R&F	8–0	Yuen Long	Guangzhou, China
14:30 (UTC+8)	Déblé 11', 24', 72', 88'; Guira 28'; Sartori 35'; Tsang Chi Hau 62' (o.g.); Leonço 82'	Report		Stadium: Yanzigang Stadium; Attendance: 316; Referee: Tang Hing Fu

19 October 2019	Tai Po	1–1	Kitchee	Tai Po, New Territories
14:30 (UTC+8)	Sandro 20'	Report	Ju Yingzhi 74'	Stadium: Tai Po Sports Ground; Attendance: 1,026; Referee: Luk Kin Sun

20 October 2019	Lee Man	1–0	Rangers	Sham Shui Po, Kowloon
14:30 (UTC+8)	Acosta 9'	Report		Stadium: Sham Shui Po Sports Ground; Attendance: 425; Referee: Yu Kin Fung

20 October 2019	Happy Valley	3–3	Pegasus	Diamond Hill, Kowloon
14:30 (UTC+8)	Gavilán 35'; Chu Wai Kwan 44'; Karić 64'	Report	Sasaki 69'; Chan Siu Ki 71'; Glassock 90+5'	Stadium: Hammer Hill Road Sports Ground; Attendance: 465; Referee: Tam Ping Wun

20 October 2019	Eastern	0–1	Southern	Tseung Kwan O, New Territories
17:30 (UTC+8)		Report	Major 44'	Stadium: Tseung Kwan O Sports Ground; Attendance: 731; Referee: Ng Chiu Kok

=== Round 6 ===
2 November 2019	R&F	5–1	Lee Man	Guangzhou, China
14:30 (UTC+8)	Déblé 16', 68', 71'; Giovane 34'; Sartori 82' (pen.)	Report	Diogo 36'	Stadium: Yanzigang Stadium; Attendance: 384; Referee: Yu Kin Fung

2 November 2019	Yuen Long	1–3	Tai Po	Yuen Long, New Territories
14:30 (UTC+8)	Juninho 52'	Report	Kim Min-ki 2'; Lugo 63'; Dudu 70'	Stadium: Yuen Long Stadium; Attendance: 701; Referee: Ho Wai Sing

3 November 2019	Happy Valley	1–2	Eastern	Diamond Hill, Kowloon
14:30 (UTC+8)	Miović 29'	Report	Diego 17'; Moser 22'	Stadium: Hammer Hill Road Sports Ground; Attendance: 713; Referee: Lau Fong Hei

3 November 2019	Rangers	1–1	Kitchee	Tuen Mun, New Territories
14:30 (UTC+8)	Aender 90+5' (pen.)	Report	Lum 27'	Stadium: Tuen Mun Tang Shiu Kin Sports Ground; Attendance: 452; Referee: Wong Wai Lun

4 November 2019	Pegasus	2–2	Southern	So Kon Po, Hong Kong Island
19:30 (UTC+8)	Sasaki 49'; Lokolingoy 58'	Report	Komazec 60'; Hui Wang Fung 90+3'	Stadium: Hong Kong Stadium; Attendance: 462; Referee: Tam Ping Wun

=== Round 7 ===
23 November 2019	Happy Valley	1–2	Lee Man	Diamond Hill, Kowloon
14:30 (UTC+8)	Gavilán 80' (pen.)	Report	N'dri 47'; Lee Hong Lim 54'	Stadium: Hammer Hill Road Sports Ground; Attendance: 548; Referee: Ho Wai Sing

23 November 2019	Southern	3–4	R&F	Mong Kok, Kowloon
17:30 (UTC+8)	Komazec 33'; Lau Ho Lam 60'; Hui Wang Fung 70'	Report	Sean Tse 4'; Sartori 68' (pen.); Leung Nok Hang 88'; Giovane 90'	Stadium: Mong Kok Stadium; Attendance: 901; Referee: Lau Fong Hei

24 November 2019	Tai Po	3–2	Rangers	Tai Po, New Territories
14:30 (UTC+8)	Sun Ming Him 43'; Michael Luk 69' (pen.); Kim Min-ki 76'	Report	Bazán 40', 62'	Stadium: Tai Po Sports Ground; Attendance: 537; Referee: Ng Chiu Kok

24 November 2019	Kitchee	3–1	Eastern	Mong Kok, Kowloon
14:30 (UTC+8)	Li Ngai Hoi 44'; Fernando 47'; Cheng Chin Lung 52'	Report	Lam Ka Wai 37'	Stadium: Mong Kok Stadium; Attendance: 1,993; Referee: Yu Kin Fung

25 November 2019	Pegasus	2–1	Yuen Long	So Kon Po, Hong Kong Island
20:00 (UTC+8)	Méndez 15'; Lokolingoy 89'	Report	Santana 32'	Stadium: Hong Kong Stadium; Attendance: 363; Referee: Wong Wai Lun

=== Round 8 ===
29 November 2019	Kitchee	0–0	R&F	Mong Kok, Kowloon
20:00 (UTC+8)		Report		Stadium: Mong Kok Stadium; Attendance: 1,823; Referee: Ng Chiu Kok

30 November 2019	Yuen Long	4–4	Rangers	Yuen Long, New Territories
14:30 (UTC+8)	Juninho 5', 25'; Santana 52'; Yip Tsz Chun 82'	Report	Aender 40', 60'; Bazán 41', 90+3'	Stadium: Yuen Long Stadium; Attendance: 627; Referee: Yu Kin Fung

1 December 2019	Happy Valley	1–4	Southern	Diamond Hill, Kowloon
14:30 (UTC+8)	Karić 27'	Report	Miović 10' (o.g.); Ha 79', 90+4'; Major 86' (pen.)	Stadium: Hammer Hill Road Sports Ground; Attendance: 456; Referee: Tang Hing Fu

1 December 2019	Lee Man	4–1	Tai Po	Sham Shui Po, Kowloon
14:30 (UTC+8)	Gil 44', 45+1'; N'dri 64', 66'	Report	Sandro 79'	Stadium: Sham Shui Po Sports Ground; Attendance: 742; Referee: Ho Wai Sang

1 December 2019	Pegasus	0–1	Eastern	So Kon Po, Hong Kong Island
17:30 (UTC+8)		Report	Wong Wai 86'	Stadium: Hong Kong Stadium; Attendance: 568; Referee: Lau Fong Hei

=== Round 9 ===
21 December 2019	Yuen Long	0–0	Happy Valley	Yuen Long, New Territories
14:30 (UTC+8)		Report		Stadium: Yuen Long Stadium; Attendance: 608; Referee: Luk Kin Sun

22 December 2019	Rangers	1–7	R&F	Tuen Mun, New Territories
14:30 (UTC+8)	Bazán 90+2'	Report	Lam 32', 41'; Sartori 35'; Bai He 43'; Déblé 54' (pen.); Leonço 82'; Yuen Chun Sing 84'	Stadium: Tuen Mun Tang Shiu Kin Sports Ground; Attendance: 240; Referee: Tam Ping Wun

22 December 2019	Lee Man	1–0	Eastern	Sham Shui Po, Kowloon
14:30 (UTC+8)	Ngan Lok Fung 45+3'	Report		Stadium: Sham Shui Po Sports Ground; Attendance: 1,256; Referee: Ng Chiu Kok

30 December 2019	Kitchee	2–1	Pegasus	Mong Kok, Kowloon
20:00 (UTC+8)	Ju Yingzhi 49'; Wellingsson 76'	Report	Chan Pak Hang 68'	Stadium: Mong Kok Stadium; Attendance: 1,483; Referee: Tam Ping Wun

1 January 2020	Southern	2–1	Tai Po	Mong Kok, Kowloon
14:30 (UTC+8)	Major 50', 79'	Report	Nakamura 90+2'	Stadium: Mong Kok Stadium; Attendance: 897; Referee: Lau Fong Hei

=== Round 10 ===
16 January 2020	Pegasus	0–3	Kitchee	So Kon Po, Hong Kong Island
20:00 (UTC+8)		Report	Wellingsson 4', 63'; Glassock 11' (o.g.)	Stadium: Hong Kong Stadium; Attendance: 747; Referee: Lau Fong Hei

18 January 2020	R&F	5–0	Rangers	Guangzhou, China
14:30 (UTC+8)	Déblé 25'; Sartori 37'; Giovane 56', 60' (pen.); Roberto 65'	Report		Stadium: Yanzigang Stadium; Attendance: 466; Referee: Wong Wai Lun

18 January 2020	Tai Po	2–4	Southern	Tai Po, New Territories
14:30 (UTC+8)	Chan Man Fai 45+1'; Che Runqiu 63'	Report	Chan Siu Kwan 11'; Méndez 23'; Major 30'; Dhiego 73'	Stadium: Tai Po Sports Ground; Attendance: 641; Referee: Ho Wai Sing

18 January 2020	Eastern	2–1	Lee Man	Tseung Kwan O, New Territories
17:30 (UTC+8)	Everton 13'; Sandro 20'	Report	Shapoval 75'	Stadium: Tseung Kwan O Sports Ground; Attendance: Ng Chiu Kok; Referee: 784

19 January 2020	Happy Valley	1–1	Yuen Long	Diamond Hill, Kowloon
14:30 (UTC+8)	Lai Pui Kei 83'	Report	Mikael 58' (pen.)	Stadium: Hammer Hill Road Sports Ground; Attendance: 593; Referee: Tam Ping Wun

=== Resume Round 1 (Origin Round 13) ===
19 September 2020	Eastern	2–1	Kitchee	Tseung Kwan O, New Territories
15:00 (UTC+8)	Diego 52'; Chung Wai Keung 68'	Report	Komazec 63' (pen.)	Stadium: Tseung Kwan O Sports Ground; Attendance: 0 Referee: Tam Ping Wun

20 September 2020	R&F	2–2	Southern	Tseung Kwan O, New Territories
15:00 (UTC+8)	Sartori 51' (pen.), 62'	Report	Kawase 43'; Sasaki 90+4'	Stadium: Tseung Kwan O Sports Ground; Attendance: 0 Referee: Ng Chiu Kok

21 September 2020	Lee Man	2–0	Happy Valley	So Kon Po, Hong Kong Island
15:00 (UTC+8)	Ngan Lok Fung 6'; Nakamura 62'	Report		Stadium: Hong Kong Stadium; Attendance: 0 Referee: Woo Chun Sing

=== Resume Round 2 (Origin Round 11 & 14) ===
23 September 2020	Southern	0–1	Eastern	Siu Sai Wan, Hong Kong Island
15:00 (UTC+8)		Report	Lucas 13'	Stadium: Siu Sai Wan Sports Ground; Attendance: 0 Referee: Yu Kin Fung

24 September 2020	Kitchee	2–1	Lee Man	Siu Sai Wan, Hong Kong Island
15:00 (UTC+8)	Komazec 31'; Tong Kin Man 83'	Report	N'dri 42' (pen.)	Stadium: Siu Sai Wan Sports Ground; Attendance: 0 Referee: Liu Kwok Man

25 September 2020	Happy Valley	2–5	R&F	Siu Sai Wan, Hong Kong Island
15:00 (UTC+8)	Ng Ka Yeung 67'; Moore 82'	Report	Déblé 35', 42', 76'; Lam 75'; Dudu 88'	Stadium: Siu Sai Wan Sports Ground; Attendance: 0 Referee: Luk Kin Sun

=== Resume Round 3 (Origin Round 15) ===
30 September 2020	Southern	1–1	Happy Valley	Tseung Kwan O, New Territories
15:00 (UTC+8)	Sasaki 65'	Report	Chu Wai Kwan 43'	Stadium: Tseung Kwan O Sports Ground; Attendance: 0 Referee: Wong Wai Lun

1 October 2020	R&F	2–3	Kitchee	Tseung Kwan O, New Territories
15:00 (UTC+8)	Giovane 67', 76'	Report	Law Tsz Chun 17'; Gavilán 27'; Wellingsson 80'	Stadium: Tseung Kwan O Sports Ground; Attendance: 0 Referee: Tam Ping Wun

=== Resume Round 4 (Origin Round 16 & 17) ===
4 October 2020	Kitchee	1–1	Southern	So Kon Po, Hong Kong Island
15:00 (UTC+8)	Gavilán 73'	Report	Kawase 84'	Stadium: Hong Kong Stadium; Attendance: 0 Referee: Ho Wai Sing

5 October 2020	Lee Man	0–1	R&F	Mong Kok, Kowloon
15:00 (UTC+8)		Report	Jordan Lam 41'	Stadium: Mong Kok Stadium; Attendance: 0 Referee: Woo Chun Sing

6 October 2020	Eastern	4–0	Happy Valley	Mong Kok, Kowloon
15:00 (UTC+8)	Wong Wai 44'; Lucas 46', 81'; Emir 50'	Report		Stadium: Mong Kok Stadium; Attendance: 0 Referee: Liu Kwok Man

=== Resume Round 5 (Origin Round 12 & 18) ===
11 October 2020	Happy Valley	0–4	Kitchee	Mong Kok, Kowloon
15:00 (UTC+8)		Report	Gavilán 36'; Wellingsson 59', 63', 65'	Stadium: Mong Kok Stadium; Attendance: 0 Referee: Woo Chun Sing

11 October 2020	Southern	0–4	Lee Man	Siu Sai Wan, Hong Kong Island
15:00 (UTC+8)		Report	Tarrés 1'; Leong Ka Hang 59', 74', 77'	Stadium: Siu Sai Wan Sports Ground; Attendance: 0 Referee: Wong Po Sing

11 October 2020	Eastern	0–0	R&F	So Kon Po, Hong Kong Island
15:00 (UTC+8)		Report		Stadium: Hong Kong Stadium; Attendance: 0 Referee: Ho Wai Sing

==== Notes ====
1. Match was played behind closed doors due to the 2020 coronavirus pandemic in Hong Kong.

== Season statistics ==
=== Top scorers ===
As of matches played 11 October 2020

Rank	Player	Club	Goals
1	(Ivory Coast) Serges Déblé	R&F	12
2	(France) Michaël N'dri	Lee Man	10
3	(Brazil) Igor Sartori	R&F	9
4	(Australia) Travis Major	Southern	8
4	(Brazil) Wellingsson	Kitchee	8
6	(Hong Kong) Sandro	Tai Po/Eastern	7
6	(Hong Kong) Giovane	R&F	7
8	(Argentina) Leandro Bazán	Rangers	6
8	(Spain) Manuel Gavilán	Happy Valley / Kitchee	6
10	(Serbia) Nikola Komazec	Southern / Kitchee	5

=== Hat-tricks ===
Note: The results column shows the scorer's team score first. Teams in bold are home teams.

#	Player	Nationality	For	Against	Result	Date	Ref
1	Michaël N'dri	France	**Lee Man**	Pegasus	4–2	1 September 2019	
2	Serges Déblé ^{4}	Ivory Coast	**R&F**	Yuen Long	8–0	19 October 2019	
3	Serges Déblé	Ivory Coast	**R&F**	Lee Man	5–1	2 November 2019	
4	Serges Déblé	Ivory Coast	R&F	**Happy Valley**	5–2	25 September 2020	
5	Wellingsson	Brazil	Kitchee	**Happy Valley**	4–0	11 October 2020	
6	Leong Ka Hang	Macau	Lee Man	**Southern**	4–0	11 October 2020	

Note

^{4} The player scored 4 goals.

=== Clean sheets ===
Rank	Player	Club	Match(es)
1	(China) Zhou Yuchen	R&F	6
2	(Hong Kong) Yapp Hung Fai	Eastern	5
3	(Hong Kong) Wang Zhenpeng	Kitchee	4
3	(Hong Kong) Yuen Ho Chun	Lee Man	4
5	(Hong Kong) To Chun Kiu	Happy Valley	2
6	(Hong Kong) Yip Ka Yu	Yuen Long	1
6	(Hong Kong) Tse Tak Him	Southern	1

== Attendances ==
As of matches played 19 January 2020

Pos	Team	Total	High	Low	Average	Change
1	Kitchee	9,617	2,772	1,483	1,923	+9.0%
2	Lee Man	4,386	1,256	425	877	+39.9%
3	Southern	3,443	978	667	861	+4.1%
4	Eastern	2,408	893	731	803	−22.8%
5	Tai Po	3,173	1,026	537	793	−37.9%
6	Yuen Long	2,727	791	608	682	−27.1%
7	Happy Valley	2,775	713	456	555	n/a^{1}
8	Pegasus	3,308	747	363	551	−43.0%
9	R&F	1,942	466	316	388	−45.1%
10	Rangers	1,124	452	240	375	n/a^{1}
	League total	34,903	2,772	240	793	−15.3%

Source: HKFA
Notes:
1: Team did not play in the Premier League last season

== Awards ==
=== Monthly Most Valuable Player ===
Month	Most Valuable Player		References
Month	Player	Club	References
August & September	(France) Michaël N'dri	Lee Man	
October	(Ivory Coast) Serges Déblé	R&F	
November	(Hong Kong) Giovane	R&F	
December	(Hong Kong) Ngan Lok Fung	Lee Man	
January	(Brazil) Wellingsson	Kitchee	
February	(Hong Kong) Sun Ming Him	Tai Po	
March	(Hong Kong) Sandro	Eastern	
September & October	(Hong Kong) Shinichi Chan	Kitchee	

=== Hong Kong Top Footballer Awards ===
This year's Hong Kong Top Footballer Awards was cancelled due to the 2020 coronavirus pandemic in Hong Kong.
