= 2020 Lunar New Year Cup =

鼠年賀歲盃
Hong Kong	Hong Kong Premier League XI
- Cancelled
- Date: 26 January 2020
- Venue: Mong Kok Stadium, Hong Kong

The 2020 Lunar New Year Cup (Chinese: 鼠年賀歲盃; lit. 'Year of the Mouse Celebrate New Year Cup') was an annual football event to be held in Hong Kong to celebrate Chinese New Year. The event was organized by the Hong Kong Football Association. 2 matches were to be played.

However, on 23 January 2020, three days before the event, the HKFA announced its cancellation due to the COVID-19 pandemic in Hong Kong.

== Teams ==
All teams were to have come from Hong Kong this year.

First match (90 minutes):

- Hong Kong Women's Representative Team
- Stars of Future

Second match (90 minutes):

- Hong Kong Representative Team
- Hong Kong Premier League XI

== Squads ==
=== Hong Kong Women's Representative Team ===
- Team Manager: Betty Wong
- Head coach: (Brazil) Ricardo
- Coach: Wong Chi Wai, Wong Shuk Fan, Fan Chun Kit
- Goalkeeper coach: Poon Kwong Tak

No.	Pos.	Player	Date of birth (age)	Club
	GK	(Hong Kong) Ng Cheuk Wai		(Hong Kong) Happy Valley
	GK	(Hong Kong) Ng Yuen Ki		(Hong Kong) Chelsea FC Soccer School (HK)
	DF	(Hong Kong) Sin Chung Yee		(Hong Kong) Happy Valley
	DF	(Hong Kong) Ma Chak Shun		(Hong Kong) Happy Valley
	DF	(Hong Kong) Wong So Han		(Hong Kong) Happy Valley
	DF	(Hong Kong) So Hoi Lam		(Hong Kong) Happy Valley
	DF	(Hong Kong) Kwok Ching Man		(Hong Kong) Citizen
	DF	(Hong Kong) Woo Lok Ki		(Hong Kong) Sha Tin
	MF	(Hong Kong) Chan Wing Sze		(Hong Kong) Sha Tin
	MF	(Hong Kong) Yiu Hei Man		(Hong Kong) Happy Valley
	MF	(Hong Kong) Cham Ching Man		(Hong Kong) Happy Valley
	MF	(Hong Kong) Tsang Lai Mae		(Hong Kong) Happy Valley
	MF	(Hong Kong) Ho Mui Mei		(Hong Kong) Citizen
	MF	(Hong Kong) Wai Yuen Ting		(Hong Kong) Citizen
	FW	(Hong Kong) Cheung Wai Ki		(Hong Kong) Citizen
	FW	(Hong Kong) Yuen Hoi Dik		(Hong Kong) Citizen
	FW	(Hong Kong) Lee Wing Yan		(Hong Kong) Kitchee
	FW	(Hong Kong) Chan Hiu Man		(Hong Kong) Tai Po

=== Stars of Future ===
- Team Manager: Betty Wong
- Head coach: Chan Shuk Chi
- Coach: Fan Ying Ying, Ng Wing Kum
- Goalkeeper coach: Wong Tsz Him
- Conditioning coach: (England) Matthew Pears

No.	Pos.	Player	Date of birth (age)	Club
	GK	(Hong Kong) Chow Kam Yee		(Hong Kong) Tai Po
	GK	(Hong Kong) Shick Mona		(Hong Kong) HKFC
	DF	(Hong Kong) Tsang Pak Tung		(Hong Kong) Tai Po
	DF	(Hong Kong) Hui Yee Sum		(Hong Kong) Citizen
	DF	(Hong Kong) Chu Po Yan		(Hong Kong) Citizen
	DF	(Hong Kong) Wu Choi Yiu		(Hong Kong) Chelsea FC Soccer School (HK)
	DF	(Hong Kong) Wong Hei Tung		(Hong Kong) Chelsea FC Soccer School (HK)
	DF	(Hong Kong) Sum Hiu Tung		(Hong Kong) HKFC
	MF	(Hong Kong) Tse Wing Chin		(Hong Kong) Citizen
	MF	(Hong Kong) Lam Yue Yan		(Hong Kong) Citizen
	MF	(Hong Kong) Chan Chung Man		(Hong Kong) Citizen
	MF	(Hong Kong) Chan Wing Lam		(Hong Kong) Chelsea FC Soccer School (HK)
	MF	(Hong Kong) Chan Yee Hing		(Hong Kong) Chelsea FC Soccer School (HK)
	MF	(Hong Kong) Andrea Chan		(Hong Kong) HKFC
	FW	(Hong Kong) Sneha Limbu		(Hong Kong) Citizen
	FW	(Hong Kong) Ching Ka Yam		(Hong Kong) Citizen
	FW	(Hong Kong) Cheung Tsz Ching		(Hong Kong) Chelsea FC Soccer School (HK)
	FW	(Hong Kong) Leung Hong Kiu		(Hong Kong) Chelsea FC Soccer School (HK)
	FW	(Hong Kong) Chu Sin Kwan		(Hong Kong) Sha Tin

=== Hong Kong Representative Team ===
- Head coach: Cheung Kin Fung
- Coach: Yu Siu Chee, Fan Chun Yip, (England) Matthew Pears

No.	Pos.	Player	Date of birth (age)	Caps	Goals	Club
	GK	(Hong Kong) Yip Ka Yu	24 December 1996 (aged 23)	0	0	(Hong Kong) Yuen Long
	GK	(Hong Kong) Tse Ka Wing	4 September 1999 (aged 20)	0	0	(Hong Kong) R&F
	DF	(Hong Kong) Law Chun Ting	11 January 1996 (aged 24)	0	0	(Hong Kong) Yuen Long
	DF	(Hong Kong) Tsang Chi Hau	12 January 1990 (aged 30)	3	0	(Hong Kong) Yuen Long
	DF	(Hong Kong) Chan Kong Pan	13 April 1996 (aged 23)	0	0	(Hong Kong) Southern
	DF	(Hong Kong) Lau Hok Ming	19 October 1995 (aged 24)	0	0	(Hong Kong) Lee Man
	DF	(Hong Kong) Yu Pui Hong	7 February 1995 (aged 24)	0	0	(Hong Kong) Lee Man
	DF	(Hong Kong) Yu Wai Lim	20 September 1998 (aged 21)	0	0	(Hong Kong) Lee Man
	MF	(Hong Kong) Lai Kak Yi	10 May 1996 (aged 23)	0	0	(Hong Kong) Yuen Long
	MF	(Hong Kong) Wu Chun Ming	21 November 1997 (aged 22)	1	0	(Hong Kong) Eastern
	MF	(Hong Kong) Yue Tze Nam	12 May 1998 (aged 21)	2	0	(Hong Kong) Eastern
	MF	(Hong Kong) Lai Pui Kei	30 December 2001 (aged 18)	0	0	(Hong Kong) Happy Valley
	MF	(Hong Kong) Lau Ho Lam	22 January 1993 (aged 27)	0	0	(Hong Kong) Southern
	MF	(Hong Kong) Lam Hin Ting	9 December 1999 (aged 20)	0	0	(Hong Kong) R&F
	FW	(Hong Kong) Chu Wai Kwan	9 February 1999 (aged 20)	0	0	(Hong Kong) Happy Valley
	FW	(Hong Kong) Yuen Sai Kit	19 December 1999 (aged 20)	0	0	(Hong Kong) Happy Valley
	FW	(Hong Kong) Chan Kwong Ho	31 December 1996 (aged 23)	1	0	(Hong Kong) Southern
	FW	(Hong Kong) Lam Hok Hei	18 September 1991 (aged 28)	12	3	(Hong Kong) Rangers

=== Hong Kong Premier League XI ===
- Head coach: Liu Chun Fai
- Coach: Anílton, Chan Ka Ki

No.	Pos.	Player	Date of birth (age)	Club
	GK	(Hong Kong) To Chun Kiu	17 July 1994 (aged 25)	(Hong Kong) Happy Valley
	GK	(Hong Kong) Li Yat Chun	8 December 1995 (aged 24)	(Hong Kong) Southern
	DF	(Hong Kong) Fábio Lopes	24 March 1977 (aged 42)	(Hong Kong) Yuen Long
	DF	(Serbia) Igor Miovic	11 March 1986 (aged 33)	(Hong Kong) Happy Valley
	DF	(Brazil) Luciano	13 June 1987 (aged 32)	(Hong Kong) Happy Valley
	DF	(Brazil) Beto	10 July 1984 (aged 35)	(Hong Kong) Southern
	DF	(Japan) Kota Kawase	8 November 1992 (aged 27)	(Hong Kong) Southern
	DF	(United States) Shay Spitz	27 January 1988 (aged 31)	(Hong Kong) Southern
	MF	(Hong Kong) Aender Naves	12 February 1983 (aged 36)	(Hong Kong) Rangers
	MF	(Brazil) Kessi	26 October 1994 (aged 25)	(Hong Kong) Yuen Long
	MF	(Brazil) Mikael	6 April 1993 (aged 26)	(Hong Kong) Yuen Long
	MF	(Brazil) Juninho	11 December 1990 (aged 29)	(Hong Kong) Yuen Long
	MF	(Brazil) João Emir	17 March 1989 (aged 30)	(Hong Kong) Eastern
	MF	(Bosnia and Herzegovina) Mahir Karić	5 March 1992 (aged 27)	(Hong Kong) Happy Valley
	MF	(Argentina) Jonathan Acosta	11 October 1988 (aged 31)	(Hong Kong) Lee Man
	MF	(Ukraine) Serhiy Shapoval	7 February 1990 (aged 29)	(Hong Kong) Lee Man
	FW	(Hong Kong) Christian Annan	3 May 1978 (aged 41)	(Hong Kong) Rangers
	FW	(Brazil) Maicon Santana	22 February 1989 (aged 30)	(Hong Kong) Yuen Long

== Results ==
=== First match ===
26 January 2020
13:30 UTC+8

Hong Kong Women	Cancelled	Stars of Future

Mong Kok Stadium, Hong Kong

=== Second match ===
26 January 2020
16:00 UTC+8

Hong Kong	Cancelled	Hong Kong Premier League XI

Mong Kok Stadium, Hong Kong
