= Fung Hoi Man =

Hong Kong footballer-manager (born 1977)

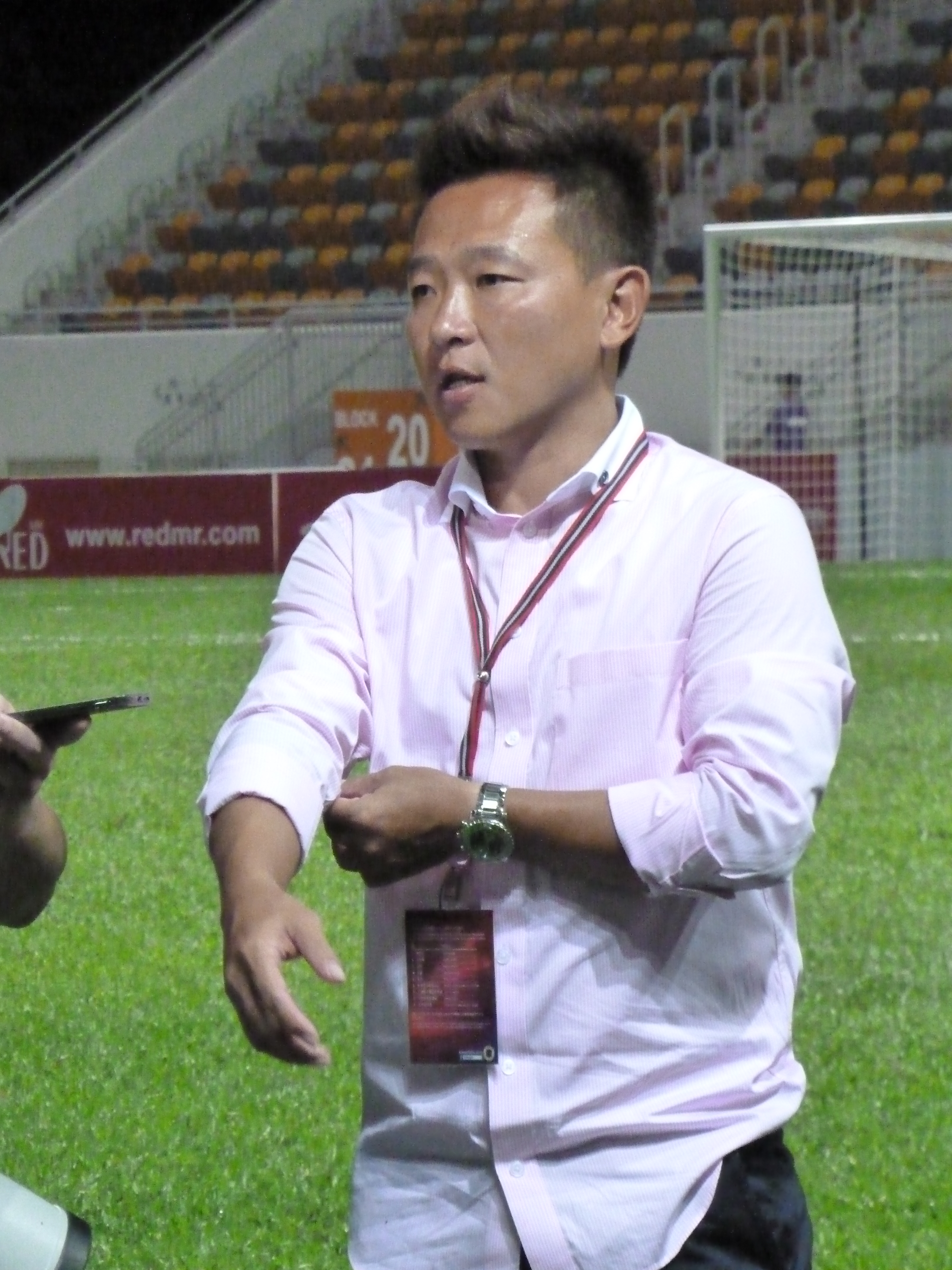

Personal information
- Full name: Fung Hoi Man
- Date of birth: 12 March 1977 (age 49)
- Place of birth: Hong Kong
- Height: 1.66 m (5 ft 5 1/2 in)
- Position: Midfielder

Team information
- Current team: Kowloon City (head coach)

Youth career
- 1991–1993: Eastern
- 1993–1994: Sing Tao

Senior career*
Years	Team	Apps	(Gls)
1994–1997	Sing Tao		
2006–2007	HKFC	4	(0)

Managerial career
- 2000–2002: Diocesan Boys' School
- 2002–2003: Sham Shui Po
- 2003–2004: Hong Kong 08 (assistant coach)
- 2008–2009: Five-One-Seven
- 2009–2015: Southern
- 2015–2016: Yuen Long
- 2016–2017: Rangers (HKG)
- 2017–2018: Lee Man (assistant coach)
- 2018: Lee Man
- 2018–2019: Hoi King
- 2019–2020: Tai Po
- 2019–2020: Tai Po (director of football)
- 2021–2026: Hoi King
- 2025–: Kowloon City
- * Club domestic league appearances and goals as of 17 November 2025 ‡ National team caps and goals as of 17 November 2025

Fung Hoi Man (Chinese: 馮凱文; Jyutping: fung^{4} hoi^{2} man^{4}, born 12 March 1977) is a Hong Kong football coach and a former player. He is the current head coach of Hong Kong Premier League club Kowloon City.

Fung holds an AFC A Licence and The FA International Coaching Licence.

== Club career ==
Fung's club career was more or less unsuccessful. He played for Eastern and Sing Tao youth team before being promoted to the first team at Sing Tao. However, under great competition at the club, he failed to establish his position and thus moved on to his managerial career, where he found success.

He returned football playing career as he joined newly promoted side HKFC in 2006. However, he was forced to retire due to an anterior cruciate ligament injury.

== Managerial career ==
=== Early career ===
He started managing Jockey Club Ti-I College football team in 1997. He then managed Diocesan Boys' School in 2000, at the same time when he was managing Jockey Club Ti-I College, leading Diocesan Boys' School gain promotion from Third Division to First Division in five years, as well as leading them as the champions of the All Hong Kong Schools Jing Ying Football Tournament in 2003, when they were still competing in Third Division. Due to his impressive results in managerial career, Hong Kong Third Division club Sham Shui Po invited him as the head coach of the club in 2002. He left the club after spending one season with them, as he joined Hong Kong 08 as an assistant coach, alongside famous coach Chan Hiu Ming.

=== Southern ===
He joined Southern in 2008 as a coach alongside Cheng Siu Chung. He brought the club to a success as he led the club gain promotion to the First Division for the first time in club history, as well as claiming the Hong Kong Junior Challenge Shield champions in 2011. Southern's first season in the First Division was a great success as they placed 4th in the league, gaining a place for 2012–13 Hong Kong season play-offs, as well as reaching semi-finals of the Senior Shield. He was awarded the Coach of the Year at the end of the season.

=== Lee Man ===
Fung left Southern following the 2014-15 season and the following two seasons as head coach at Yuen Long and then at Rangers. After Lee & Man Paper withdrew their sponsorship of Rangers in order to field their own HKPL club, Fung moved to Lee Man to become an assistant under head coach Fung Ka Ki.

Following Ka Ki's resignation, Fung was promoted to co-head coach on 10 April 2018.

=== Hoi King ===
In April 2018, Hong Kong First Division club Hoi King applied for promotion to the 2018–19 Hong Kong Premier League, despite not finishing in an automatic promotion place. The club, which was co-founded by Fung, had their application accepted and Fung confirmed in June that he would take up full time head coaching duties for the 2018–19 season.

In March 2021, Fung took over as the head coach of Hoi King, which competed in the Hong Kong First Division, and achieved a commendable third-place finish in the 2024–25 season.

=== Tai Po ===
On 29 July 2019, Fung was announced as a co-head coach at Tai Po along with Kwok Kar Lok. He changed his role to director of football after the club signed Davor Berber to be their new head coach.

On 29 May 2020, it was revealed that Fung had stepped down due to ongoing salary arrears at Tai Po. He claimed that he had taken the "initiative" to resign in hopes that any remaining money at the club would go towards the players.

=== Hong Kong Polytechnic University Football Team ===
In the 2024–25 season, Fung took on the role of head coach for the university football team and led the squad to victory in the Hong Kong Tertiary Institutions Sports Association Men's Football Competition, winning the championship. This marked the Polytechnic University's return to the Intercollegiate Cup title after six years.

=== Women's Football ===
In 2001, Fung began coaching the Jockey Club Ti-I College women's football team and led the team to win the inter-school football championship for ten consecutive years, completing a remarkable ten-year reign before leaving the team.

In the 2004–05 season, he served as the head coach of the Shatin women's football team, leading them to a third-place finish in the women's football league in his first season.

In August 2022, Fung, one of the founders of Hoi King, took over as head coach of the women's team, subsequently achieving third place in the Jockey Club Women's Football League (Division B) in the 2023–24 and 2024–25 seasons.

=== Kowloon City ===
On 17 November 2025, Fung was appointed as the head coach of Kowloon City, which marked his return to the top flight after 5 years.
