= Jockey Club Ti-I College =

Secondary school in Fo Tan, Hong Kong

Coordinates: 22.39215°N 114.19774°E

- 賽馬會體藝中學

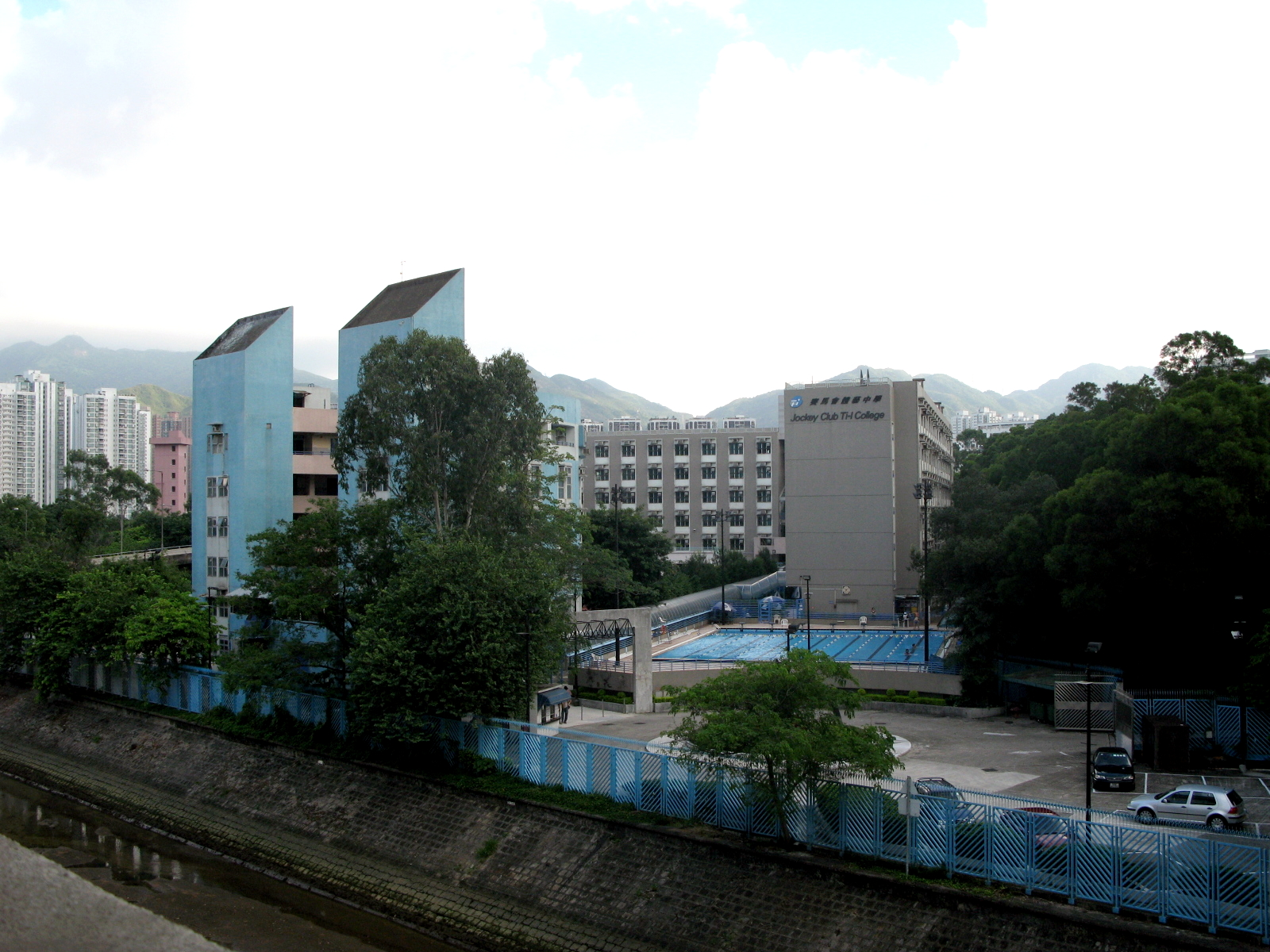
- JCTIC School Campus Overview

Location
- 5-7 Lok King Street, Fo Tan, Sha Tin; New Territories, Hong Kong

Information
- School type: Aided, Secondary, Co-educational
- Motto: 體仁藝智 (Sports, Humanity, Art, Wisdom)
- Founded: September 1989; 36 years ago
- Principal: Mr. Kevin LIE
- Grades: F.1 – F.6
- Language: English
- Area: 20,000 m²
- Houses: 4 (Blue, Green, Red, Yellow)
- Colours: Blue
- Slogan: Dedicated to Excellence in Academics, Sports and Visual Arts
- Yearbook: In Quest of...
- Website: tic.edu.hk

Jockey Club Ti-I College
- Traditional Chinese: 賽馬會體藝中學
- Simplified Chinese: 赛马会体艺中学
- Literal meaning: Jockey Club Athletics and Arts Secondary School
Transcriptions
Standard Mandarin
- Hanyu Pinyin: Sàimǎhuì Tǐ Yì Zhōngxué
Yue: Cantonese
- Jyutping: coi3 maa5 wui6*2 tai2 ngai6 zung1 hok6

Jockey Club Ti-I College (TIC or JCTIC, Chinese: 賽馬會體藝中學, Demonym: Ti-Ian) is a secondary school in Fo Tan, Hong Kong. The setting up of Ti-I College ('Ti-I' pronounced as 'tee yee'), which is not only focused on normal academic curriculum, but also aimed to develop students' potential of visual arts and sports, was proposed by Sir Edward Youde, the late governor of Hong Kong.

The school curriculum uses English as the medium of instruction in all subjects, with the exception of Chinese language and Chinese History.

== History ==
The idea of founding the school originated with the late governor, Sir Edward Youde. He proposed the setting up of a secondary school in Hong Kong which would not only emphasize academic performance but also provide an opportunity to develop students' potential in sports and the visual arts.

In November 1985, the chief secretary came to an agreement with the Hong Kong Jockey Club (the then Royal Hong Kong Jockey Club) that such a school would be built in Sha Tin. A total funding of HK$84 million Hong Kong dollars was established by the RHKJC and the government.

The Education Department invited professionals and educators to form the School Management Board. The school began its operation in September 1989 and is now fully operational.

== Etymologies and logo ==
=== School name ===
The Chinese name of the college, "賽馬會體藝中學", translates literally as "Jockey Club Sports – Arts College". "體" refers to Sports (體育) and "藝" refers to Arts (藝術). This name reflects how the founding of the college emphasises sport and art.

=== Logo ===
School logo of Jockey Club Ti-I College

The school logo was designed by Hong Kong designer Kan Tai Keung. To match the college's ambition to the provide education in the visual arts and sports, the logo highlights the two main elements: an art palette and an athlete.

The art palette represents their focus on the visual arts. The running posture of an athlete, which is reshaped as the word Ti, represents their passion to sports.

== Special features ==
=== Admission ===
Jockey Club Ti-I College is the only secondary school in Hong Kong that has full autonomy in the Secondary School Places Allocation (SSPA) for Form 1 student intake. This means the college can recruit students in Hong Kong with no restriction on districts. For Primary 6 students who are participating in the SSPA System, applying for the college does not take up the two quotas of discretionary application in the system.

=== Dormitory ===
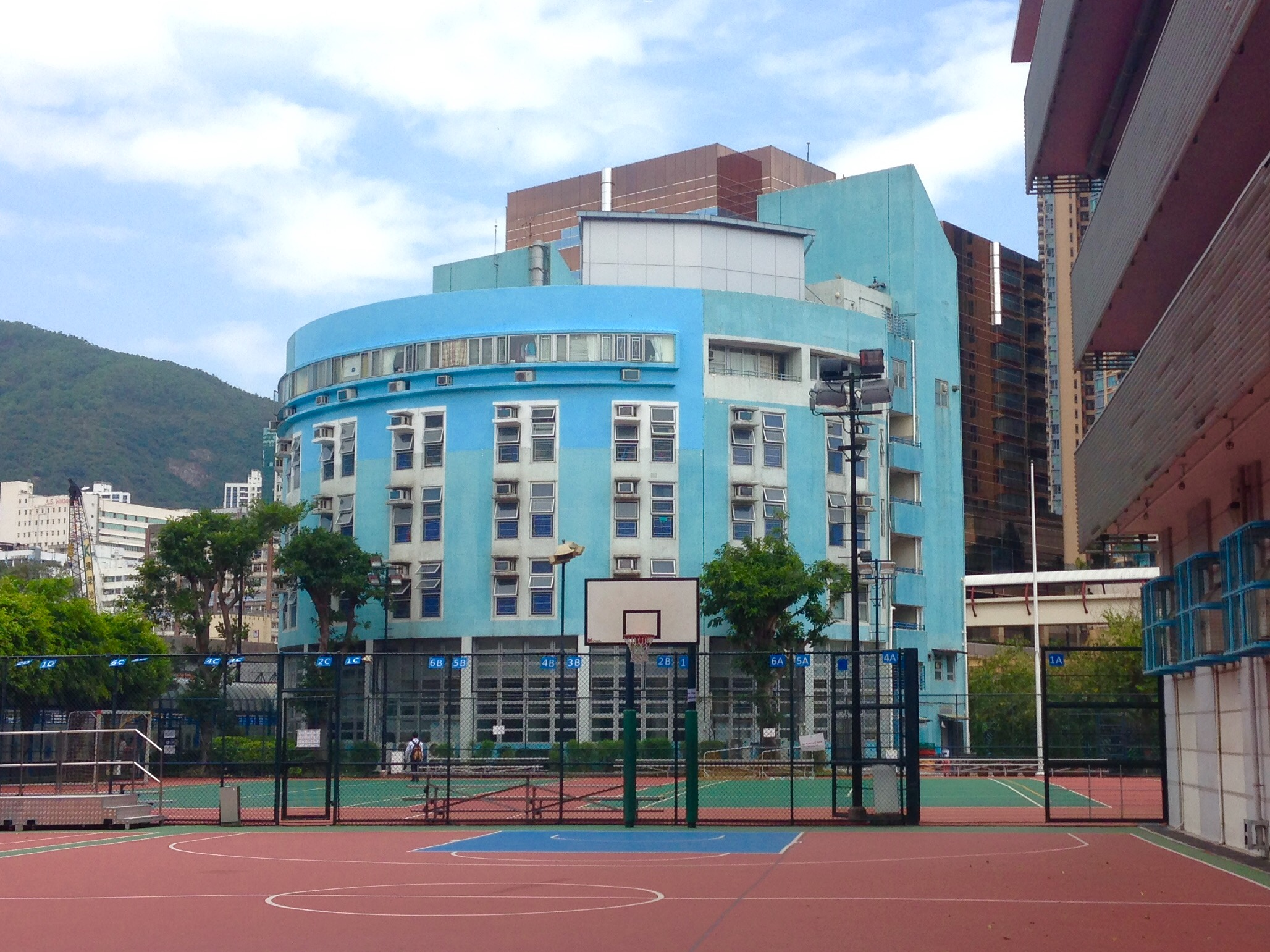
Dormitory

Jockey Club Ti-I College is one of the very few secondary schools in Hong Kong with a dormitory. Its maximum capacity is 96.

=== Choice for an elective ===
The college is the first of its kind in Hong Kong where students can choose between specialising in visual arts or sports when they are admitted. The idea is to develop students' all-around abilities and interests besides academic excellence. The student has more lessons for their selected stream.

=== Special facilities ===
The college has seven special art rooms for students including: the Drawing and Printing Room, Sculpture Room, Graphic Design Room, Ceramics Room, Photography Room, Print-making Room and the Art Gallery.

For physical education, the college has three tennis courts, two basketball courts, a sports science and fitness centre, a gymnasium, a fitness room and a rooftop basketball court.

An accessible lift and accessible toilets are also available for students with special needs.

== Achievements ==
=== Sports ===
Jockey Club Ti-I College is often called a "traditional elite sports school" (Chinese: 傳統體育名校) by the news media. Until now, the college is the only secondary school in Hong Kong that achieved both boys and girls group basketball overall champion in the same tournament in the All Hong Kong Schools Jing Ying Basketball Tournament of 1998-99, a major school sport competition organised by the Hong Kong Schools Sports Federation.

=== Visual Arts ===
The secondary school has been invited to different art-related projects, notably events such as the collaboration with agnès b and Optical 88 that invited the school's students to design eye-wears, and as one of the participating studios in Fo Tan Open Studios annual event.

== Students ==
Students of Jockey Club Ti-I College are required to choose a major either in visual arts or physical education before admission.

Other than specialised school-based curriculum for these two specialized areas, students study other subjects offered by a normal grammar school in Hong Kong. They eventually sit for the new Hong Kong Diploma of Secondary Education (HKDSE) when they leave the college in Form 6.

Some students will continue to pursue tertiary education in physical education or visual arts and work in related fields upon graduation.

== Facilities ==
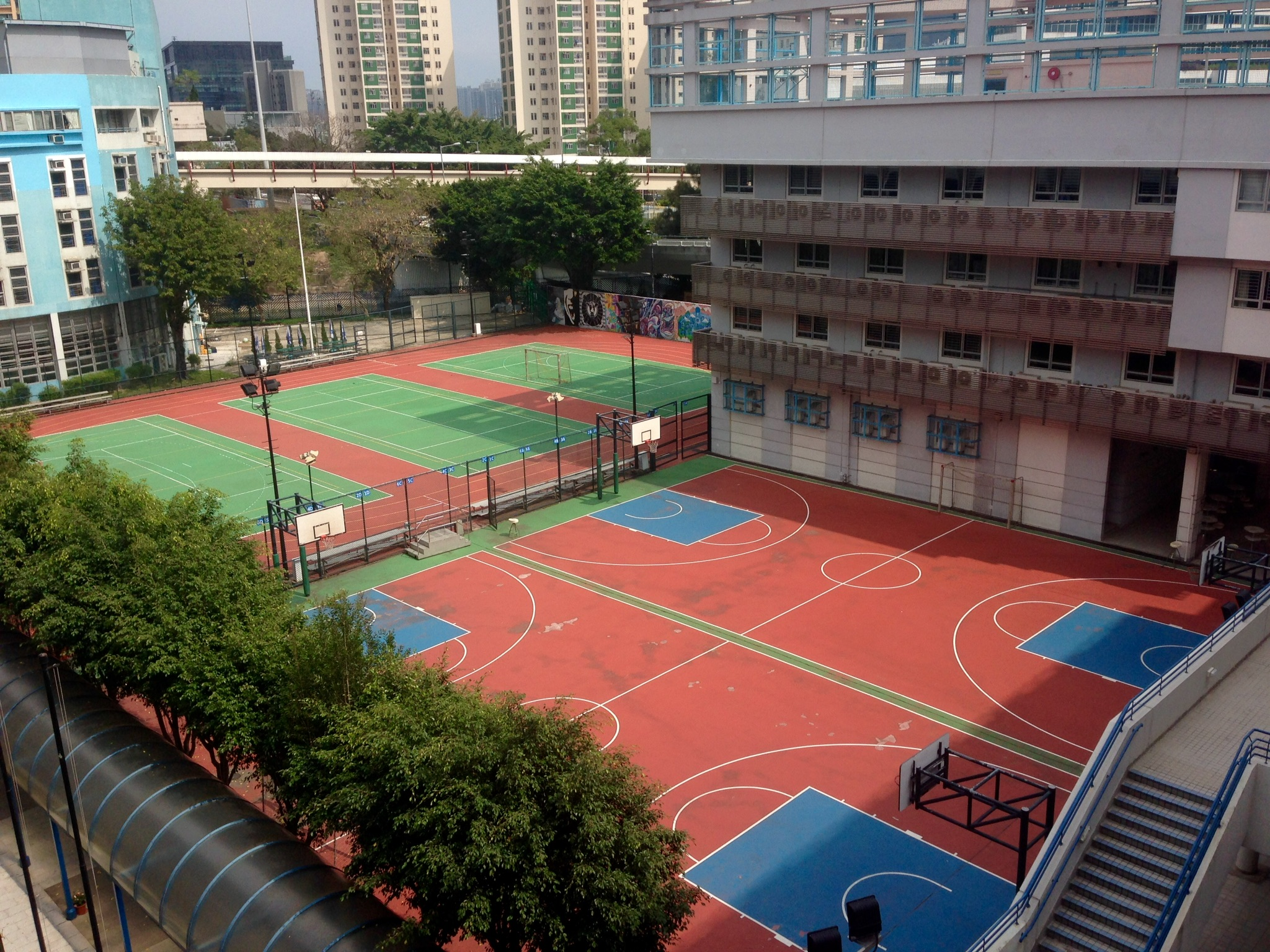
Photo in 2016

Block / Area	Facilities
Main Block	Art gallery, sports science & fitness centre, drawing and printing room, sculpture room, graphic design room, ceramics room, photography room, media laboratory, geography room and computer room.
Hall Block	Gymnasium, fitness room, school hall and English centre.
Extension Block	Lecture theatre, campus store, computer-assisted learning room (CAL room), print-making room, student activity room, Learning Hub (formerly Library) and roof top basketball court.
Dormitory Block	Canteen, study room and dormitory.
Multi-purpose area (Ground floor)	Covered playground, 3 tennis courts and 2 basketball court.
Others	Swimming pool.

== Former principals ==
- Mr Chang Cheuk Cheung, Terence (founding principal, former principal of Diocesan Boys' School).
- Miss Chan Yin Hung, Kuby (current principal of Munsang College).
- Mr Au Yeung Ying Cheong, Remuel (former principal of Islamic English College).
- Miss Lam Yuen Kwan, Yvonne (former principal of Chan Shu Kui Memorial School).
- Dr Terrence Quong.
- Mr Cheng Yuen Shan, Vincent (current principal of Ti-I College, former vice-principal of King Ling College).

== Notable alumni ==
- Yip Pui Yin (Badminton player).
- Fung Ka Ki (Football coach and player).
- Lee Chi Ho (Football player).
- Rebecca Chiu (Squash player).
- Fung Hoi Man (Football coach and player).
- Annie Au (Squash player).
- Leo Au (Squash player).
- Joey Chan (Squash player).
- Ngan Lok Fung (Football player).
- Koon Wai Chee (Badminton player).
- So Yi Chun (Basketball player and ViuTV sports programme TV host).
- Kayan Chan (Singer, former member of Hong Kong girl group As One).
- Alton Wong (Member of Hong Kong boy group Mirror)

== External examination results ==
=== Hong Kong Certificate of Education Examination ===
For the past five years, the passing rates of Chinese, English, mathematics, visual arts and physical education were 91%, 97.4%, 94.4%, 97.4% and 88.2% respectively. The best result obtained was 7As1C.

=== Hong Kong Advanced Level Examination ===
For the past five years, the passing rates of Chinese and English were 97.9% and 95.7% respectively. The best result obtained was 3As1B. The university admission rate was 75.3%.

=== Hong Kong Diploma of Secondary Education Examination ===
In 2018, the percentage of students meeting the entrance requirements for local bachelor degree programmes and sub-degree programmes were 60.1% and 94.6% respectively.

== See also ==
- Jockey Club Government Secondary School
