= Diego Cañete =

Argentine footballer (born 1986)

Personal information
- Full name: Diego Daniel Cañete
- Date of birth: 25 June 1986 (age 40)
- Place of birth: Olavarría, Argentina
- Height: 1.78 m (5 ft 10 in)
- Position: Forward

Youth career
- El Fortín
- –2004: Independiente

Senior career*
Years	Team	Apps	(Gls)
2005–2006	Racing de Olavarría		
2007–2008	El Fortín		
2008	Quilmes		
2009–2011	Racing de Olavarría		
2011–2012	Ferro Carril Sud	31	(9)
2012–2013	Belgrano	0	(0)
- Argentino de Pehuajó
- Ferro Carril Sud
2019–2020	Hong Kong Rangers	8	(1)
2021	Metro Gallery	11	(8)
2022–2023	Racing de Olavarría		
- S.T.M.O Olavarría
- * Club domestic league appearances and goals

Diego Daniel Cañete (born 25 June 1986) is an Argentine former footballer.

== Club career ==
Born in Olavarría, Cañete began his career with El Fortín. After a spell with Racing de Olavarría, he returned to El Fortín before being signed by Quilmes in July 2008.

In 2012, following impressive performances with Ferro Carril Sud in the Torneo Argentino B, Cañete was linked with a move to Torneo Argentino A side Unión. However, despite this, he made a move to Primera División side Belgrano, with club president Armando Pérez confirming that he would play for the club's amateur side in the lower divisions.

He would later go on to describe his time with Belgrano as the "most bitter" experience of his career, stating that the club asked him for money in order to play. Having left the club in the summer of 2013, he was linked to a move to Hong Kong with Happy Valley, following the appointment of compatriot Sergio Timoner as head coach.

Cañete would spend time with lower-division side Deportivo Argentino de Pehuajó, before returning to Ferro Carril Sud in mid-2015. However, by mid-2016 he was playing futsal with La Estancia, where he scored forty-eight goals in his first eight games.

Having first been linked with a move to the country in 2013, Cañete moved to Hong Kong in 2019, joining Premier League side Rangers. While in Hong Kong, Cañete would state that he did not feel he was able to play with as much flair as he did in Argentina. Following the COVID-19 pandemic in Hong Kong, which brought a premature end to the 2019–20 season, he underwent surgery to his spine following an injury. After a year with Rangers, Cañete dropped down to the second-tier First Division side Metro Gallery.

He returned to Argentina in 2022, re-joining Racing de Olavarría for a season, before joining Sindicato de Trabajadores Municipales de Olavarría.

== Career statistics ==
=== Club ===
Appearances and goals by club, season and competition
Club	Season	League			National Cup		League Cup		Other		Total	
Club	Season	Division	Apps	Goals	Apps	Goals	Apps	Goals	Apps	Goals	Apps	Goals
Racing de Olavarría	2005–06	Torneo Argentino A	10	0	0	0	–		0	0	10	0
Ferro Carril Sud	2011–12	Torneo Argentino B	31	9	1 (Note: Appearances in the Copa Argentina)	0	–		0	0	32	9
Belgrano	2012–13	Primera División	0	0	0	0	–		0	0	0	0
Rangers	2019–20	Premier League	8	1	0	0	5 (Note: Appearances in the Sapling Cup)	0	1 (Note: Appearances in the Senior Shield)	0	14	1
Metro Gallery	2020–21	First Division	11	8	0	0	0	0	0	0	11	8
Career total			60	18	1	0	5	0	1	0	67	18
