= Lee Man F.C. =

Football club in Hong Kong

Lee Man Football Club
- Full name: Branded name: Lee Man Football Club; Legal registration name: Lee Man Football Limited
- Nickname: Golden Dragon
- Founded: 2017; 9 years ago
- Ground: Mong Kok Stadium
- Capacity: 6,664
- Chairman: Norman Lee
- Head coach: Giancarlo Italiano
- League: Hong Kong Premier League
- 2025–26: 3rd of 10
Home colours	Away colours

Lee Man Football Club
- Traditional Chinese: 理文足球會
Transcriptions
Yue: Cantonese
- Jyutping: Lei^{2}man^{4} Zuk^{1}kau^{4}wui^{2}

Lee Man
- Traditional Chinese: 理文
Transcriptions
Yue: Cantonese
- Jyutping: Lei^{2}man^{4}

Lee Man Football Limited
- Traditional Chinese: 理文足球有限公司
Transcriptions
Yue: Cantonese
- Jyutping: Lei^{2}man^{4} Zuk^{1}kau^{4} Jau^{5}haan^{6}gung^{1}si^{1}

Lee Man Football Club (Chinese: 理文足球會) is a Hong Kong professional football club based in Mong Kok, which currently competes in the Hong Kong Premier League. Lee & Man Chemical Limited is the major sponsor of the club.

The club won their first league title in the 2023–24 season with an unbeaten record.

== History ==
Lee Man Football Club was established on 19 June 2017 by Lee Man Football Limited with the aim of promoting football in Hong Kong and allowing Hong Kong football players to shine with the club.

During the 2017–18 season, Lee Man Football Limited decided to invest their money in building their own football club. They paid an entrance fee of HKD 1 million to the Hong Kong Football Association for the right to enter a club directly into the Hong Kong Premier League. The club hired former Hong Kong international Fung Ka Ki as their first manager on 3 July 2017. Lee Man recorded their first win in the club history on 15 September in a 3–2 league win against Eastern with Spanish player Jordi Tarrés scoring the club's first official goal. However, Manager Fung Ka Ki would only last one season as manager since the club finished a disappointing 8th place.

=== First piece of silverware ===
On 21 May 2018, Lee Man hired former Hong Kong national team and Macau national team head coach Chan Hiu Ming as its manager. Under Chan, the club won its first trophy, capturing the 2018–19 Hong Kong Sapling Cup on 27 April 2019 in a 3–2 victory over Yuen Long.

Lee Man participated in their first intercontinental tournament, the AFC Cup qualifying straight to the 2021 AFC Cup group stage, On 23 June 2021, Lee Man recorded their first win in the tournament against another local club, Eastern SC with Gil scoring the only goal in the match in a 1–0 win. Lee Man went on to win all of their group stage match winning Taiwanese club Tainan City 4–1 on 26 June and winning against Mongolian club Athletic 220 thrashing them 1–5 on 29 June thus qualifying to the Inter-zone play-off finals playing against Uzbekistani club Nasaf on 20 October. Throughout the match, Lee Man put up a good fight against Nasaf drawing with them 2–2 thus seeing them both going through extra time, however in the first half of extra time, opponent player Andrija Kaluđerović scored the goal for Nasaf which would see Lee Man bowed out from the tournament with the final score being 3–2.

Lee Man then qualified for the 2022 AFC Cup group stage being placed with the same opponent in 2021, but this time, the club bowed out from the tournament early in the group stage.

On 5 February 2023, Chan was sacked by Lee Man after a disappointing performance and on 27 April 2023, Tsang Chiu Tat was appointed as the head coach of the club. Lee Man finished the 2022–23 season as runners-up which sees the club qualified for the 2023–24 AFC Champions League qualifying phase. On 16 August 2023, Lee Man thrashed Indonesian club Bali United 5–1 at home which saw them qualified for the play-off round against 2022 AFC Champions League winner, Urawa Red Diamonds, however, Lee Man lost 3–0 to the Japanese side at the Saitama Stadium 2002 which see their opponent qualified to the group stage.

=== First league title with an unbeaten run ===
On 19 May 2024, Lee Man secured their first Hong Kong Premier League title after a 6–1 victory against Sham Shui Po. They became the fourth club to win the league title and the second unbeaten title-winning team – a record of 17 wins and 3 draws. Lee Man also directly qualified for the group stage of the inaugural 2024–25 AFC Champions League Two. The club is then drawn into Group G alongside Thailand club Bangkok United, Vietnamese club Nam Định and Singaporean club Tampines Rovers.

== Stadium ==
Lee Man played their home matches at the Tseung Kwan O Sports Ground which can hold a capacity of up to 5,000. However, as the stadium didn't meet AFC requirements, Lee Man played all of their 2024–25 AFC Champions League Two home matches at the Mong Kok Stadium. Since the start of the 2025–26 season, the team has played all their home fixtures at this location.

== Current squad ==
=== First team ===
As of 29 September 2026

Note: Flags indicate national team as defined under FIFA eligibility rules; some limited exceptions apply. Players may hold more than one non-FIFA nationality.

No.	Pos.	Nation	Player
1	GK	HKG	Leung Hing Kit
3	DF	BRA	Willian Gaúcho
4	DF	JPN	Ryoya Tachibana
5	DF	HKG	Chan Yun Tung
6	MF	HKG	Wu Chun Ming (vice-captain)
7	FW	ESP	Noah Baffoe
8	MF	ESP	Borja Martínez
10	MF	BUL	Bozhidar Kraev
11	MF	HKG	Sohgo Ichikawa
14	MF	HKG	Yu Joy Yin
16	MF	HKG	Ngan Lok Fung (captain)
19	FW	BRA	Luis Phelipe (on loan from Sheriff Tiraspol)
22	DF	HKG	Tsang Yi Hang

No.	Pos.	Nation	Player
27	FW	HKG	Lau Yu Ho
28	GK	HKG	Chan Ka Ho
30	MF	HKG	Hui Siu Chung
31	DF	HKG	Yung Hui To
32	MF	COL	Elian Villalobos
33	GK	HKG	Lo Kin Fung
36	MF	HKG	Bau Hok Yin
37	DF	HKG	Chan Yin Lok
44	DF	UZB	Dostonbek Tursunov
77	MF	GEO	Merab Gigauri
80	FW	HKG	Chung Wai Keung
99	FW	HKG	Michael Udebuluzor

=== Out on loan ===
Note: Flags indicate national team as defined under FIFA eligibility rules; some limited exceptions apply. Players may hold more than one non-FIFA nationality.

No.	Pos.	Nation	Player
—	GK	HKG	Poon Sheung Hei (at HKFC until 31 May 2027)
—	MF	HKG	Law Cheuk Hei (at Kowloon City until 31 May 2027)

== Club official ==
Position	Staff
Head coach	(Australia) Giancarlo Italiano
Assistant coaches	(Australia) Pouria Nabi
Assistant coaches	(Hong Kong) Lo Chi Kwan
Goalkeeping coach	(Hong Kong) Cheng Ho Man
Fitness coach	(Hong Kong) Lee Kin Wai
Technical analyst	(Hong Kong) Tai Sze Chung

== Season-to-season record ==
Season	Tier	Division	Teams	Position	Home Stadium	Attendance/G	FA Cup	Senior Shield	League Cup	Sapling Cup	HKPLC Cup
2017–18	1	Premier League	10	8	Tseung Kwan O Sports Ground	509	Quarter-finals	Quarter-finals	Not held	Group stage	Not held
2018–19	1	Premier League	10	9	Tseung Kwan O Sports Ground	627	Quarter-finals	Quarter-finals	Not held	Champions	Not held
2019–20	1	Premier League	10	4	Sham Shui Po Sports Ground	877	First round	Runners-up	Not held	Group stage	Not held
2020–21	1	Premier League	8	3	Tseung Kwan O Sports Ground	852	Cancelled due to COVID-19 pandemic		Not held	Semi-finals	Not held
2021–22	1	Premier League	8	Cancelled	Tseung Kwan O Sports Ground	943	Cancelled due to COVID-19 pandemic		Not held	Cancelled due to COVID-19 pandemic	Not held
2022–23	1	Premier League	10	2	Tseung Kwan O Sports Ground	817	Quarter-finals	Semi-finals	Not held	Runners-up	Not held
2023–24	1	Premier League	11	1	Tseung Kwan O Sports Ground	716	Semi-finals	Semi-finals	Not held	Group stage	Runners-up
2024–25	1	Premier League	9	2	Tseung Kwan O Sports Ground	574	Quarter-finals	Runners-up	Not held	Runners-up	Defunct
2025–26	1	Premier League	10	3	Mong Kok Stadium	1,157	Quarter-finals	Quarter-finals	Champions	Defunct	Defunct
2026–27	1	Premier League	11		Mong Kok Stadium					Defunct	Defunct

Note:

1st or Champions 2nd or Runners-up 3rd place Promotion Relegation

== Continental record ==
Season	Competition	Round	Opponent	Home	Away	Aggregate
2021	AFC Cup	Group J	(Hong Kong) Eastern	1–0		1st
2021	AFC Cup	Group J	(Chinese Taipei) Tainan City	4–1		1st
2021	AFC Cup	Group J	(Mongolia) Athletic 220	5–1		1st
2021	AFC Cup	Inter-zone play-off final	(Uzbekistan) Nasaf Qarshi	2–3 (a.e.t.)		
2022	AFC Cup	Play-off round	(Mongolia) Athletic 220	2–1		
2022	AFC Cup	Group J	(Hong Kong) Eastern	1–3		2nd
2022	AFC Cup	Group J	(Chinese Taipei) Tainan City	3–1		2nd
2023–24	AFC Champions League	Preliminary stage	(Indonesia) Bali United	5–1		
2023–24	AFC Champions League	Play-off stage	(Japan) Urawa Red Diamonds	0–3		
2024–25	AFC Champions League Two	Group G	(Thailand) Bangkok United	0–1	1–4	4th
2024–25	AFC Champions League Two	Group G	(Vietnam) Thép Xanh Nam Định	0–2	0–3	4th
2024–25	AFC Champions League Two	Group G	(Singapore) Tampines Rovers	0–0	1–3	4th

== Honours ==
=== League ===
- Hong Kong Premier League
  - Champions (1): 2023–24

=== Cup competitions ===
- Hong Kong Sapling Cup
  - Champions (1): 2018–19
- Hong Kong League Cup
  - Champions (1): 2025–26

== Performance records ==
=== Performance by coach ===
Coach	From	To	Achievements
(Hong Kong) Fung Ka Ki	1 July 2017	9 April 2018	
(Hong Kong) Fung Hoi Man	10 April 2018	20 May 2018	
(Hong Kong) Chan Hiu Ming	21 May 2018	5 February 2023	2018–19 Hong Kong Sapling Cup
(Hong Kong) Tsang Chiu Tat	5 February 2023	3 October 2024	2023–24 Hong Kong Premier League
(Hong Kong) Chu Siu Kei (Interim)	3 October 2024	21 November 2024	
(Wales) Matthew Holland	21 November 2024	10 March 2025	
(Hong Kong) Chu Siu Kei	10 March 2025	8 March 2026	
(England) Darren Read (Interim)	8 March 2026	17 May 2026	2025–26 Hong Kong League Cup
(Australia) Giancarlo Italiano	17 June 2026		
