= Michael Glassock =

Australian soccer player

Personal information
- Full name: Michael John Glassock
- Date of birth: 4 November 1999 (age 27)
- Place of birth: Central Coast, Australia
- Height: 1.91 m (6 ft 3 in)
- Position: Central defender

Team information
- Current team: Sydney United 58
- Number: 17

Youth career
- Killarney District
- The Entrance Bateau Bay
- 2010–2017: Central Coast Mariners

Senior career*
Years	Team	Apps	(Gls)
2017–2019	CCM Academy	53	(3)
2019	Central Coast Mariners	0	(0)
2019–2020	Pegasus	20	(2)
2021–2022	Sydney Olympic	45	(5)
2023	Sri Pahang	25	(0)
2024	Sydney Olympic	10	(0)
2025-	Sydney United 58	63	(3)

International career^{‡}
- Australia
- * Club domestic league appearances and goals as of 19 October 2026 ‡ National team caps and goals as of 2 September 2019

Michael Glassock (born 4 November 1999), is an Australian professional soccer player who plays as a central defender for Sydney United 58.

== Early life ==
Glassock was born in Gosford, on the Central Coast of New South Wales. He attended St Peter's Catholic College, Tuggerah from 2012 to 2017.

== Career ==
=== Pegasus ===
Glassock was announced as a Pegasus player on 16 July 2019. Glassock made his professional debut for Hong Kong Pegasus on 1 September 2019 against Lee Man.

Glassock became a regular first team starter in his first season for the Flying Horseman, playing a total of 20 games across the Hong Kong Premier League, FA Cup, Senior Shield and Sapling Cup Competitions scoring 2 goals.

However, his stay in Hong Kong was cut short due to the 2020 coronavirus pandemic which caused the 2019–20 season to be suspended. On 8 April 2020, Glassock agreed to a mutual termination with Pegasus.

=== Sydney Olympic FC ===
On 1 December 2020, Sydney Olympic FC announced they had signed Glassock.

In the 2021 NPL season, Glassock started all of Sydney Olympic's 17 NPL games and 4 of its FFA Cup Preliminary games before the season ended due to the COVID-19 outbreak in NSW. He scored 4 goals from 21 appearances.

On 24 November, at just 22 years and 20 days, Glassock captained Sydney Olympic against Sydney FC in the FFA Cup Round of 32. On 31 July, he helped Sydney Olympic to win the 2022 NSW NPL Premiership and was named in NPL NSW Team Of The Year for 2022.

=== Sri Pahang ===
After a successful 2022 season for Sydney Olympic, Glassock signed for Malaysia Super League side Sri Pahang FC on 6 January 2023.

Glassock played 25 games for Sri Pahang FC across all competitions helping the side finish 5th in the Malaysian Super League.

== Honours ==
=== Club ===
Sydney Olympic FC:

- NSW NPL Premiership: 2022

Sydney United 58:

- National Premier Leagues NSW Championship: 2026
- Waratah Cup Champions: 2025, 2026

=== Individual ===
- NSW NPL Team of the Year: 2022
