= Maicon Santana =

Brazilian footballer

Personal information
- Full name: Maicon Festa Santana
- Date of birth: 22 February 1989 (age 37)
- Place of birth: Veranópolis, Brazil
- Height: 1.91 m (6 ft 3 in)
- Position: Forward

Team information
- Current team: Próspera

Youth career
- 1995–2007: Veranópolis
- 2007–2008: Internacional

Senior career*
Years	Team	Apps	(Gls)
2008–2009	Santo André	0	(0)
2009–2010	São Bento	0	(0)
2010–2011	Aimoré	0	(0)
2011	Juventus-RS	0	(0)
2011	Caxias	1	(0)
2011–2012	Iraty	6	(0)
2012	Londrina	0	(0)
2012	Passo Fundo	0	(0)
2012–2013	Aimoré	0	(0)
2013–2014	Cerâmica	0	(0)
2014–2015	Santa Cruz	0	(0)
2015–2016	Tupy	4	(1)
2016–2018	Guarany	0	(0)
2018	Passo Fundo	12	(3)
2018–2019	Próspera	5	(2)
2019	Bagé	14	(3)
2019	Juventus Jaraguá	6	(0)
2019–2020	Yuen Long	6	(2)
2021–	Próspera	0	(0)
- * Club domestic league appearances and goals as of 8 February 2021

Maicon Festa Santana (born 22 February 1989) is a Brazilian footballer who currently plays as a forward for Próspera.

== Career statistics ==
=== Club ===
As of 30 August 2019.

Club	Season	League			State League		National Cup		League Cup		Other		Total	
Club	Season	Division	Apps	Goals	Apps	Goals	Apps	Goals	Apps	Goals	Apps	Goals	Apps	Goals
Caxias	2011	Série C	1	0	0	0	0	0	–		0	0	1	0
Iraty	2012	–			6 (Note: Appearances in the Campeonato Paranaense)	0	0	0	–		0	0	6	0
Tupy	2016	–			4 (Note: Appearances in the Campeonato Gaúcho Acesso)	1	0	0	–		0	0	4	1
Passo Fundo	2018	–			12	3	0	0	–		0	0	12	3
Próspera	2018	–			5 (Note: Appearances in the Campeonato Catarinense Série C)	2	0	0	–		0	0	5	2
Bagé	2019	–			14	3	0	0	–		0	0	14	3
Juventus Jaraguá	2019	–			6 (Note: Appearances in the Campeonato Catarinense Série B)	0	0	0	–		0	0	6	0
Yuen Long	2019–20	Premier League	0	0	–		0	0	0	0	0	0	0	0
Career total			1	0	47	9	0	0	0	0	0	0	48	9
