= Chung Wai Keung =

Hong Kong footballer (born 1995)

Chung Wai Keung 鍾偉強
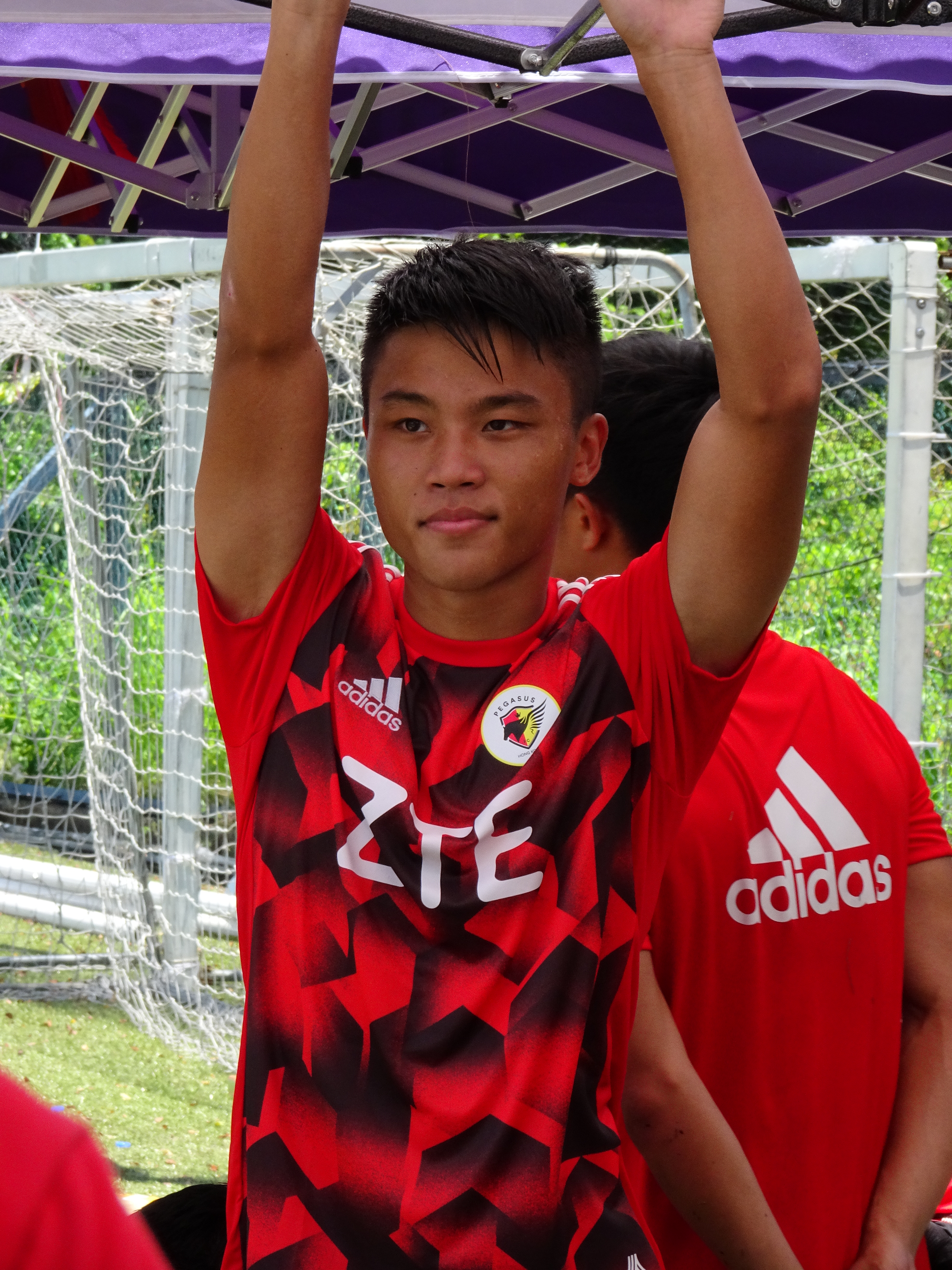

Personal information
- Full name: Chung Wai Keung
- Date of birth: 21 October 1995 (age 31)
- Place of birth: Hong Kong
- Height: 1.76 m (5 ft 9 in)
- Position: Winger

Team information
- Current team: Lee Man
- Number: 80

Youth career
- 2009–2011: Sun Source

Senior career*
Years	Team	Apps	(Gls)
2012–2015	Sun Source	14	(1)
2015–2016	Metro Gallery	15	(1)
2016–2018	Pegasus	12	(0)
2018–2019	Tai Po	11	(1)
2019–2022	Eastern	21	(4)
2022–2026	Tai Po	61	(5)
2026–	Lee Man	5	(0)

International career^{‡}
2015–2018	Hong Kong U-23	10	(1)
2018–2021	Hong Kong	9	(1)
- * Club domestic league appearances and goals as of 20 November 2026 ‡ National team caps and goals as of 15 June 2021

Chung Wai Keung (Chinese: 鍾偉強; born 21 October 1995) is a Hong Kong professional footballer who currently plays as a forward for Hong Kong Premier League club Lee Man.

== Club career ==
Chung joined Sun Source when he was 15 years old.

On 20 July 2015, Chung joined Hong Kong Premier League club Metro Gallery. On 30 January 2016, Chung scored his first goal in his football career against Pegasus, which the match won 3–0.

On 12 July 2016, Chung was introduced as a Pegasus player during the club's season-opening training session.

On 21 July 2018, Chung moved to fellow HKPL club Tai Po.

On 17 July 2019, Eastern announced the signing of Chung at their season-opening media event.

On 9 July 2022, Chung left Eastern.

On 8 August 2022, Chung joined Tai Po.

On 9 July 2026, Chung joined Lee Man.

== International career ==
In 2015, Chung represented Hong Kong U-23 when he was just 19 years old.

On 11 November 2018, Chung made his debut for the national team and scored an important goal to help Hong Kong defeat Chinese Taipei 2–1. His performance was highly appreciated by the coaches and fans.

== Career statistics ==
=== International ===
As of matches played 15 June 2021.

National team	Year	Apps	Goals
Hong Kong	2018	2	1
Hong Kong	2019	5	0
Hong Kong	2020	0	0
Hong Kong	2021	2	0
Total		9	1

=== International goals ===
Scores and results list Hong Kong's goal tally first.

No.	Date	Venue	Opponent	Score	Result	Competition
1.	11 November 2018	Taipei Municipal Stadium, Taipei, Chinese Taipei	Chinese Taipei	2–1	2–1	2019 EAFF E-1 Football Championship qualification

== Honours ==
=== Club ===
Eastern

- Hong Kong Senior Shield: 2019–20
- Hong Kong FA Cup: 2019–20

Tai Po

- Hong Kong Premier League: 2018–19, 2024–25
- Hong Kong FA Cup: 2025–26
- Hong Kong Senior Shield: 2025–26
