= Gabriel Méndez =

Argentine footballer

Personal information
- Full name: Gabriel Antonio Méndez
- Date of birth: 8 May 1988 (age 38)
- Place of birth: Paso de los Libres, Argentina
- Height: 1.70 m (5 ft 7 in)
- Position: Attacking midfielder

Youth career
- Racing Club

Senior career*
Years	Team	Apps	(Gls)
2007–2008	Racing Club	5	(0)
2009	Olmedo	28	(7)
2009–2010	Deportivo Cuenca	21	(6)
2010–2011	Banfield	27	(5)
2011–2012	San Lorenzo	23	(2)
2012–2013	Atlético Tucumán	29	(4)
2013	Manta	13	(1)
2014	Cobreloa	35	(11)
2015	Unión Española	8	(1)
2016–2017	Boca Unidos	5	(0)
2017–2018	Olmedo		
2018–2019	LDU Portoviejo		
2019	Pegasus	3	(1)
2020	Southern	2	(1)
2020–2021	LDU Portoviejo		
2021	Olmedo	0	(0)
- * Club domestic league appearances and goals as of 14:53, 29 May 2022 (UTC)

Gabriel Antonio Méndez (born 8 May 1988) nicknamed "El correntino", is an Argentine professional footballer who is currently a free agent. He plays as an attacking midfielder or striker.

== Career ==
Méndez started his playing career in 2007 with Racing Club, in which he had been playing in the youth teams. However, he couldn't establish himself as a regular first team player and could only play 5 matches coming in as a substitute. In 2009, he joined Ecuadorian side Olmedo, in which he played 28 matches and scored 7 goals. After 6 months in Olmedo, he joined Deportivo Cuenca, in which he played 21 matches, scoring 6 goals, 3 of them in 2010 Copa Libertadores (2 against Banfield, his future club, and 1 against Monarcas Morelia). In July 2010, Méndez joined Banfield on a 1-year loan.

On 18 October 2019, Méndez agreed to a one-year deal with Hong Kong club Pegasus. He left the club on 17 December 2019, claiming that he could not adapt to the football environment of Hong Kong.

However, only 2 weeks later on 1 January 2020, Méndez signed for another Hong Kong Premier League club, Southern. His time with Southern ended on 20 April when he agreed to an early termination with the club due to financial difficulties caused by the 2020 coronavirus pandemic.

In November 2020, Méndez returned to Ecuador and signed with his former club, LDU Portoviejo. The season ended with relegation to the Ecuadorian Serie B. Méndez left LDU in June 2021, due to lack of playing time. In August 2021, he signed a short-term contract with C.D. Olmedo. In November 2021, it was reported - however, not officially - that he had left Olmedo, before he had even played for the club.
