= Tai Po F.C. =

Football club in Hong Kong

Tai Po 大埔
- Full name: Tai Po Football Club
- Nickname: The Greens (綠戰士)
- Short name: Tai Po
- Founded: 2002; 24 years ago
- Ground: Tai Po Sports Ground
- Capacity: 3,200
- Owner(s): Francis and Caroline Yip
- President: Peter Lam
- Head coach: Lee Chi Kin
- League: Hong Kong Premier League
- 2025–26: Hong Kong Premier League, 2nd of 10
Home colours	Away colours

Tai Po Football Club (Chinese: 大埔足球會) is a Hong Kong professional football club based in Tai Po. They currently compete in the Hong Kong Premier League, the top flight of Hong Kong football.

In the 2018–19 season, Tai Po won their first league title becoming the third club to win the title. The club is the first district team to win a top-flight title since Yuen Long during the 1962–63 season and the first-ever district team to win the Hong Kong Premier League title.

Tai Po is the first club in Hong Kong to have won league titles in the first, second, third and fourth tiers division.

Throughout their history, Tai Po has won 2 Hong Kong Premier League, 2 Hong Kong First Division, 1 Hong Kong Second Division, 1 Hong Kong Third Division, 2 Hong Kong FA Cup and 2 Hong Kong Senior Shield.

== History ==
=== Early stage (2002–2007) ===
Tai Po entered the newly formed Third District Division in 2002–03 season. The club was promoted to the Second Division in 2004–05 season after claiming the title of the Third Division in the previous season. In 2005–06 season, they gained the promotion to the First Division after finishing second in the Second Division, behind HKFC.

Tai Po struggled during early stage of the 2006–07 season, conceded 13 goals in the first three league matches, which is consistent with many pre-season predictions. The club's fourth game of the season was at home against local giants South China on 30 September 2006. This was the first ever First Division match to be played at Tai Po Sports Ground. With over 2,500 supporters cheering the home team and the signings of three Brazilian players, the club played courageously and only lost the game in the last minute by 2–3. The Greens' performance vastly improved since the home game. They recorded some surprising victories including a great come back (scored a 4–3 from 1–3) against the defending league champion Happy Valley and a last minute winner (a direct free kick to make it 2–1 by defender Joel in 90') against multiple cup winner Kitchee in November 2006.

Tai Po secured their First Division berth for the 2007–08 season after defeating HKFC 3–0 on 5 April 2007, which also resulted in HKFC's relegation.

=== Ascension to the First Division (2007–2013) ===
After their maiden top flight season, the club's coach Chan Hiu Ming left the club for the newly promoted Workable (Chinese: 華家堡). Tai Po spent most of the off-season searching for a new coach. Finally, former Hong Kong football star Tim Bredbury, who coached Rangers for a short period of time in the previous season, accepted the job. Moreover, in response to the successful and popular home game last season, Tai Po has applied for 5 home games to be played in Tai Po in the following season.

HKFA has announced the decision: the first 9 matches of Tai Po FC, no matter scheduled as home or away game, will be played in Tai Po Sports Ground. But the arrangement was strongly criticised and objected by the first game opponent, Workable's manager also Tai Po FC's ex-coach Chan Hiu Ming. Chan Hiu Ming expressed his team would not play their home game at Tai Po Sports Ground firmly and questioned the fairness about the arrangement. Eventually, HKFA re-arranged the schedule, where Tai Po would only play their home game at Tai Po Sports Ground for the entire season.

Unfortunately, Tai Po Sports Ground's refurbishment didn't help much on the pitch quality. Up to this point, no Tai Po's game has been held at Tai Po Sports Ground.

Apart from promoting players from the youth team, the team kept most of its important homegrown players, except Kan Tsz Yeung (Chinese: 簡子洋) and Chung Kin Keung (Chinese: 鍾健強), both left to join Workable. The three foreign players also stayed with the team in the new season, including the fans' favourite Christian Annan. New players was introduced after the season has started. Chinese player Ye Jia (Chinese: 葉佳) was signed from Rangers after the first match, and followed by the Brazilian forward Rafael dos Santos, Betine "Betine", who has also scored a debut goal in the match against Rangers.

The first 5 matches in the season resulted in 7 league points, which met the expectation. The contract of Tim Bredbury was terminated with agreement from both parties, however. Some notable reasons are the board disagreeing on some decisions of Bredbury on starting line up and substitution. Tim Bredbury has also had very poor relationship with the players caused by the training methods. Formation, tactics and player deployment was also highly questionable (some notable decisions were deploying players well known with skill to play in center position to the wing, and wingers were deployed in the central midfield). Chan Ho Yin (Chinese: 陳浩然) was appointed as the main coach after Tim Bredbury's departure.

Another notable events of the club in the season was the penalty dispute in the league game against Eastern AA at 2 December 2007. In the 25th minutes, Tai Po was awarded a penalty and scored by Dega. However, Dega was judged, by the game referee Pau Sai Yin, performed interrupting movement during approaching the ball. According to the rule of FIFA, for infractions by the kicking team, should a goal be scored the kick is retaken. However, the referee awarded a free kick to Eastern which has violated the rule of FIFA. After the game, Tai Po made an official objection to the HKFA and the objection has been approved by the example of the rematch decision made by FIFA on 2006 FIFA World Cup Qualifying game Bahrain vs Uzbekistan. In the rematch, Tai Po won by 3–1, Dega scored a penalty kick without any disputes.

The team had some bad matches in the middle of the season but ended the season strongly, especially with two fabulous 2–1 winning against the eventually league champion South China. In the first match, Tai Po delayed the league championships declaration of South China and knocked it out of FA Cup in semi-final in the second match. Tai Po ended the league in the 3rd position with was over expectation. The team also played in first top division competition final against Citizen at 18 May 2008 in Hong Kong Stadium and lost the match 0–2.

With the success in the previous seasons, Tai Po secured several new sponsors; New Territories Realty Association and Creative Property Services Consultants Limited. Tai Po starts the 2008–09 season in a rather good style. Until 22 September 2008, they have recorded three straight wins. They have beaten Tuen Mun Progoal, Sheffield United and Pegasus respectively.

On 6 June 2009, Tai Po won 4:2 against Pegasus, in front of 4,042 fans at the Hong Kong Stadium, to lift the HKFA Cup, marking the first time a district team has won the trophy. Caleb Ekwegwo, Sze Kin Wai, Lee Wai Lim and Christian Annan scored the goals for Tai Po. In addition, Lee Wai Lim won the title of Man of the Match. Tai Po thus qualified to play in the AFC Cup in 2010.

The 2013–14 season saw Tai Po secure promotion back to the First Division after a final day victory over top of the table rivals Wong Tai Sin. Building from a strong defensive foundation, Tai Po managed to complete the season having conceded just 11 goals in 22 league games.

=== Top flight tribulations and glory (2013–2019) ===
The club gained promotion to the newly formed Hong Kong Premier League after winning the 2013–14 Second Division. The club lost its first match in Hong Kong Premier League 4–1 against Kitchee. The club finished bottom at the table at the end of the season and were relegated back to the First Division.

Having won the First Division League championship during the 2015–16 season, Tai Po were once again promoted to participate in the Hong Kong Premier League. Since having won the Senior Shield championship in 2012–13 Season, Tai Po won 2–1 to Hong Kong Pegasus in extra time, winning the first ever Sapling Cup champion in club history, as well as receiving the championship title of a tournament four seasons later. Brazilian Lucas Silva was elected the most valuable player of the tournament.

The club slowly built a stable roster of players, relying on a backbone of Igor Sartori, Chan Siu Kwan, Leung Kwun Chung, Eduardo Praes, and captain Wong Wai. The club's budget rose to an all-time high of $18 million during the 2018–19 season as management sensed an opportunity to win the title, adding Hong Kong international Sandro in February to aid their chase. The gamble paid off on 4 May 2019, Tai Po defeated R&F 2–1 in the penultimate match of the season, successfully claiming their first top flight title in club history. The club became the first district team to win a top-flight title since Yuen Long in 1962–63.

=== Self relegation (2020–2022) ===
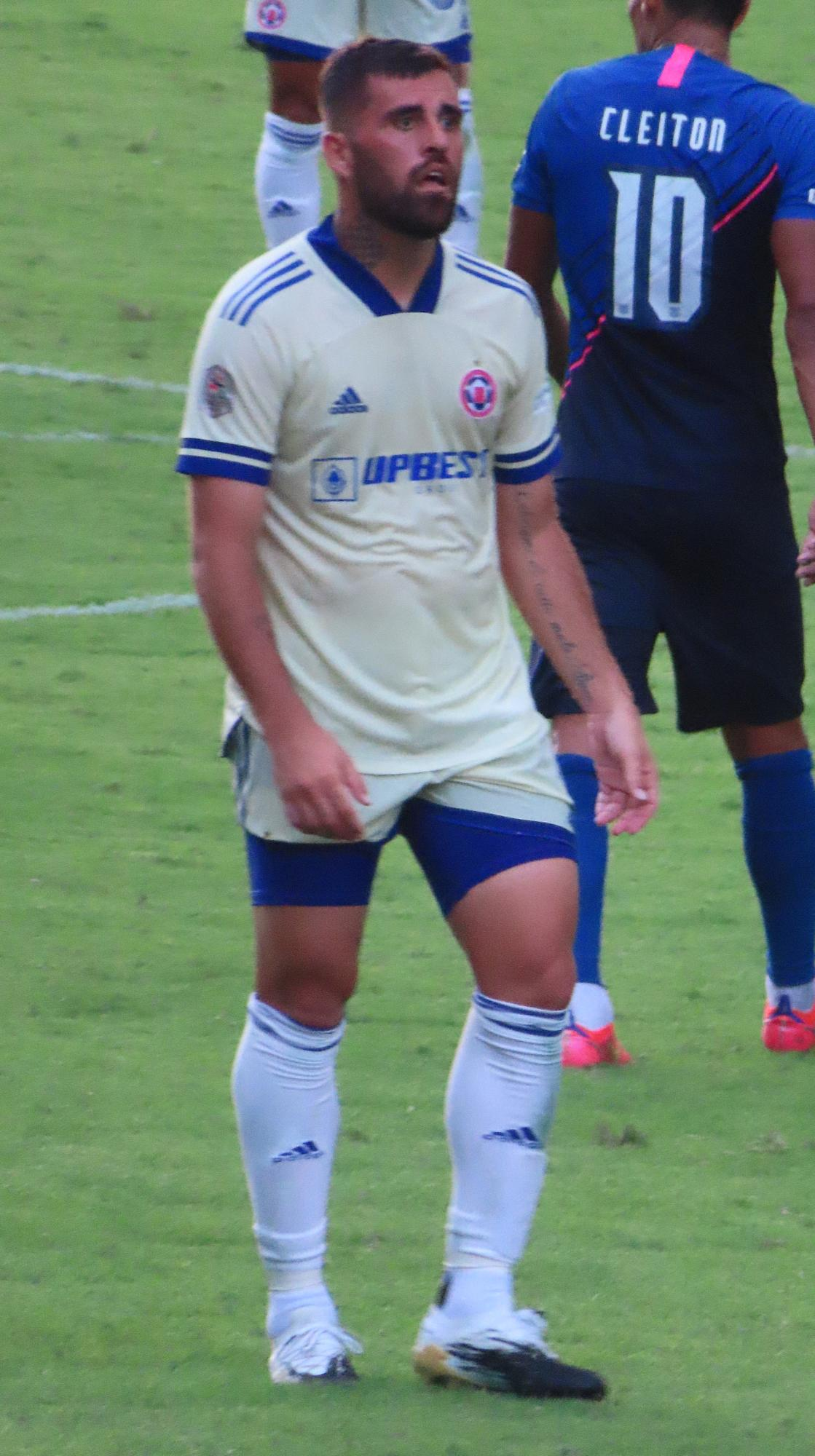
Lucas Silva returned to Tai Po in 2024 to help the club to win the 2024–25 Hong Kong Premier League.

Tai Po's struggles off the pitch, however, commenced immediately after their title winning season. After budget cuts forced the club to say goodbye to their title winning head coach Lee Chi Kin and most of their starters, the impact of the 2020 coronavirus pandemic in Hong Kong during the 2019–20 season led to the club encountering salary arrears. Fung Hoi Man, who was hired at the beginning of the season as the club's head coach and director of football, resigned in May 2020 in order to ease the financial strain on the club. However, Tai Po could not secure short term funding to continue on with the season, and on 29 May 2020, the Greens announced that they would withdraw from both the league and the 2020 AFC Cup.

Two weeks later, Tai Po confirmed their withdrawal from participation in the 2020–21 Hong Kong Premier League and was demoted to the second tier league, Hong Kong First Division League. Frustrated with the club's mismanagement, the Tai Po District Council voted unanimously on 7 July 2020 to revoke the club's authority to represent the District for the 2020–21 season.

=== Return to top flight (2022–present) ===
In July 2022, Tai Po accepted HKFA's invitation to be promoted to the 2022–23 Hong Kong Premier League after winning the 2021–22 Hong Kong First Division League title.

On 25 May 2025, Tai Po won their second Hong Kong Premier League title in the 2024–25 season where head coach Lee Chi Kin also guided the club seven years after winning their previous title in the 2018–19 season thus seeing the club qualifying to the 2025–26 AFC Champions League Two. The club then manage to win Australian club Macarthur 2–1 and also Vietnamese club Công An Hà Nội 1–0 both at home. However, Tai Po finished in third place thus bowing out from the tournament.

== Team image ==
=== Name history ===
- 2002–2006: Tai Po (大埔)
- 2006–2008: Wofoo Tai Po (和富大埔)
- 2008–2011: NT Realty Wofoo Tai Po (新界地產和富大埔)
- 2011–2015：Wofoo Tai Po (和富大埔)
- 2015–2016：Tai Po (大埔)
- 2016–2023：Wofoo Tai Po (和富大埔)
- 2023–：Tai Po (大埔)

=== Supporters ===
Tai Po fans are generally Tai Po District residents. The fans also give enough impact in terms of quantity and atmosphere.

== Stadium ==
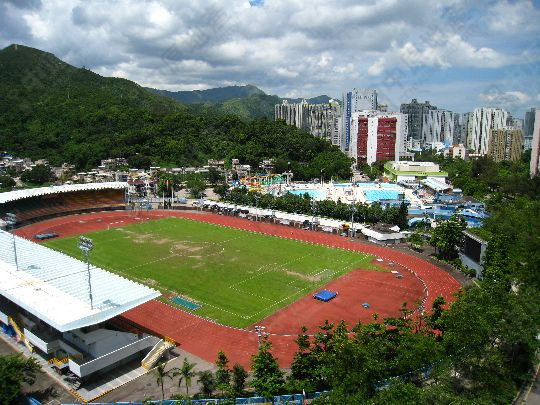
Tai Po main home stadium, Tai Po Sports Ground can host up to a number of 3,200 capacity.

=== 2006–07 season ===
Tai Po played their first home matches on Tai Po Sports Ground at 30 September 2006, against South China. As a public integrated sport facilities and is owned by the Leisure and Cultural Services Department (Hong Kong Government), the pitch and grass quality are insufficient to meet the requirement of professional football.

=== 2007–08 season ===
However, with the refurbishment in 2007, Tai Po has applied to have 5 home games, between September and November, to be held in the Sports Ground in season 2007–08.

The Hong Kong Football Association later decided the first 9 matches of Tai Po, no matter scheduled as home or away game, will be played in Tai Po Sports Ground however, which is even more than the club demanded.

The HKFA also considered arranging two matches on the same match day at the sports ground. (This type of arrangement is common in recent years of Hong Kong First Division League game, where two matches will be played immediately one after another in the same stadium, usually in weekend, so that fans can watch two matches with single match ticket price. It's known as double header. (Chinese: 雙料娛樂)

However, in a 2007–08 pre-season pitch examination, HKFA eventually decided that the ground was not up to standard for First Division matches and in the end no game was held at the ground.

=== 2008–09 season ===
HKFA finally decided all the 12 Home games of Tai Po in the season will be played in Tai Po Sports Ground. Therefore, Tai Po Sports Ground became the home stadium of Tai Po from then on, until now.

Nearly two years after Tai Po played their first ever home game in the sports ground in the First Division, Tai Po played the home game at the sports ground again against Chengdu Tiancheng on 13 September 2008. 1,136 fans attended the game and Tai Po won 2–1.

== Players ==
=== Current squad ===
As of 21 November 2026

Note: Flags indicate national team as defined under FIFA eligibility rules; some limited exceptions apply. Players may hold more than one non-FIFA nationality.

No.	Pos.	Nation	Player
1	GK	HKG	Lo Siu Kei
4	DF	BRA	Léo Rigo
6	DF	HKG	Chan Hoi Pak
7	FW	HKG	Chang Hei Yin
9	FW	BRA	Paulinho Simionato
10	MF	HKG	Fernando
11	FW	ARG	Facundo Aranda
12	MF	BRA	Gerson Vieira
13	MF	KOR	Sim Seung-hyeon
16	MF	HKG	Chan Siu Kwan (vice-captain)
17	FW	HKG	Chu King To
18	FW	BRA	Igor Sartori
19	FW	HKG	Kwok Yat Pak

No.	Pos.	Nation	Player
20	MF	HKG	Wong Hin Sum
23	MF	TPE	Emilio Estevez
25	MF	BRA	Gabriel Murilo
26	DF	HKG	Lee Ka Ho
28	MF	HKG	Wong Sum Chit
33	DF	BRA	Gabriel Cividini (captain)
38	DF	COL	Juan Loaiza
44	DF	BRA	Weverton Rangel
61	DF	HKG	Leung To Fung
79	FW	BRA	Wallisson Bahia
94	GK	HKG	Tse Ka Wing (vice-captain)
97	MF	BRA	Marquinhos
99	GK	HKG	Wu Hoi Hin

== Management and staff ==
Position	Staff
President	(Hong Kong) Yip Ng Bun Bun
Chairman	(Hong Kong) Lam Yick Kuen
Team manager	(Hong Kong) Yip Chi Hung
Director and head coach	(Hong Kong) Lee Chi Kin
Assistant coaches	(Brazil) Gerson Vieira
Assistant coaches	(Hong Kong) Wong Yiu Fu
Goalkeeping coach	(Hong Kong) Pang Tsz Kin
Fitness coach	(Brazil) Rafael Bispo

== Season-to-season record ==
Season	Tier	Division	Teams	Position	Home stadium	Attendance/G	FA Cup	Senior Shield	League Cup	Sapling Cup
2002–03	3	Third District Division	13	2			Did not enter	Did not enter	Did not enter	Not held
2003–04	3	Third District Division		1			Did not enter	Did not enter	Did not enter	Not held
2004–05	2	Second Division	12	9			Did not enter	Did not enter	Did not enter	Not held
2005–06	2	Second Division	13	2			Did not enter	Did not enter	Did not enter	Not held
2006–07	1	First Division	10	7			First round	Quarter-finals	Group stage	Not held
2007–08	1	First Division	10	3			Runners-up	First round	Group stage	Not held
2008–09	1	First Division	13	6			Champions	First round	Quarter-finals	Not held
2009–10	1	First Division	11	6	Tai Po Sports Ground	843	Semi-finals	Quarter-finals	Not held	Not held
2010–11	1	First Division	10	5	Tai Po Sports Ground	803	Runners-up	Semi-finals	Quarter-finals	Not held
2011–12	1	First Division	10	8	Tai Po Sports Ground	801	Quarter-finals	Quarter-finals	Quarter-finals	Not held
2012–13	1	First Division	10	10	Tai Po Sports Ground	850	Semi-finals	Champions	Not held	Not held
2013–14	2	Second Division	12	1			First round	–	Not held	Not held
2014–15	1	Premier League	9	9	Tai Po Sports Ground	829	Quarter-finals	Quarter-finals	Knock-out stage	Not held
2015–16	2	First Division	14	1			First round	Did not enter		
2016–17	1	Premier League	11	6	Tai Po Sports Ground	764	First round	Semi-finals	Not held	Champions
2017–18	1	Premier League	10	2	Tai Po Sports Ground	951	Runners-up	Quarter-finals	Not held	Runners-up
2018–19	1	Premier League	10	1	Tai Po Sports Ground	1,277	Quarter-finals	Runners-up	Not held	Group stage
2019–20	1	Premier League	10	Withdrew	Tai Po Sports Ground	793	Semi-finals	Semi-finals	Not held	Group stage
2020–21	2	First Division	14	13			Cancelled due to COVID-19 pandemic		Not held	Did not enter
2021–22	2	First Division	14	Cancelled			Cancelled due to COVID-19 pandemic		Not held	Cancelled due to COVID-19 pandemic
2022–23	1	Premier League	10	7	Tai Po Sports Ground	584	Quarter-finals	First round	Not held	Group stage
2023–24	1	Premier League	11	2	Tai Po Sports Ground	667	First round	Quarter-finals	Not held	Semi-finals
2024–25	1	Premier League	9	1	Tai Po Sports Ground	1,228	Semi-finals	Quarter-finals	Not held	Semi-finals
2025–26	1	Premier League	10	2	Tai Po Sports Ground	838	Champions	Champions	Semi-finals	Defunct
2026–27	1	Premier League	11		Tai Po Sports Ground					Defunct

== Continental record ==
Season	Competition	Round	Club	Home	Away	Position
2010	AFC Cup	Group H	(Singapore) Geylang United	1–1	1–1	4th
2010	AFC Cup	Group H	(Thailand) Thai Port	0–1	0–2	4th
2010	AFC Cup	Group H	(Vietnam) SHB Đà Nẵng	1–2	0–3	4th
2019	AFC Cup	Play-off round	(North Korea) Ryomyong	0–0	0–0	0–0 (5–3 p)
2019	AFC Cup	Group I	(Hong Kong) Kitchee	3–3	4–2	3rd
2019	AFC Cup	Group I	(Chinese Taipei) Hang Yuen	4–2	1–1	3rd
2019	AFC Cup	Group I	(North Korea) April 25	1–3	0–4	3rd
2020	AFC Champions League	Preliminary Round 2	(Malaysia) Kedah	1–5		
2025–26	AFC Champions League Two	Group E	(China) Beijing Guoan	3–3	0–3	3rd
2025–26	AFC Champions League Two	Group E	(Australia) Macarthur	2–1	1–2	3rd
2025–26	AFC Champions League Two	Group E	(Vietnam) Công An Hà Nội	1–0	0–3	3rd
2026–27	AFC Champions League Two	Group F	(Australia) Adelaide United		0–3	
2026–27	AFC Champions League Two	Group F	(Thailand) BG Pathum United	0–3	1–4	
2026–27	AFC Champions League Two	Group F	(Singapore) Lion City Sailors	0–1		

== Managerial history ==
Coach	From	To	Achievements
(Hong Kong) Chan Hiu Ming	1 July 2006	30 June 2007	
(Hong Kong) Tim Bredbury	31 July 2007	14 October 2007	
(Hong Kong) Chan Ho Yin	15 October 2007	30 June 2009	– 2008–09 Hong Kong FA Cup
(Hong Kong) Cheung Po Chun	1 July 2009	30 June 2013	– 2012–13 Hong Kong Senior Shield
(Hong Kong) Pau Ka Yiu	1 July 2013	3 July 2016	– 2013–14 Hong Kong Second Division League – 2015–16 Hong Kong First Division League
(Hong Kong) Lee Chi Kin	4 July 2016	30 June 2019	– 2016–17 Hong Kong Sapling Cup – 2018–19 Hong Kong Premier League
(Hong Kong) Fung Hoi Man	29 July 2019	29 May 2020	
(Hong Kong) Kwok Kar Lok (Co-head coach)	29 July 2019	6 November 2019	
(Serbia) Davor Berber	1 January 2020	1 November 2020	
(Serbia) Ivan Kurtušić (Co-head coach)	15 January 2020	8 June 2020	
(Hong Kong) Chan Yuk Chi	1 November 2020	10 July 2022	– 2021–22 Hong Kong First Division League
(Hong Kong) Li Hang Wui	11 July 2022	31 May 2023	
(Hong Kong) Lee Chi Kin	21 June 2023	Present	– 2024–25 Hong Kong Premier League – 2025–26 Hong Kong Senior Shield

== Honours ==
=== League ===
- Hong Kong Premier League
  - Champions (2): 2018–19, 2024–25
- Hong Kong First Division
  - Champions (2): 2015–16, 2021–22
- Hong Kong Second Division
  - Champions (1): 2013–14
- Hong Kong Third Division
  - Champions (1): 2003–04

=== Cup competitions ===
- Hong Kong FA Cup
  - Champions (2): 2008–09, 2025–26
- Hong Kong Senior Shield
  - Champions (2): 2012–13, 2025–26
- Hong Kong Sapling Cup
  - Champions (1): 2016–17

== Others ==
=== Book ===
Tai Po published its own book to commemorate its first season in the Hong Kong First Division League. The book is titled Wofoo Tai Po – where dreams come true (和富大埔—足可圓夢). The book has about 160 colour pages and is completely in Chinese. It contains many player interviews, history and views on district football and Hong Kong's participation in the Homeless World Cup. It retails at HK$68 (US$9). Its International Standard Book Number is: 978-988-99851-1-0.
