= Kwok Kar Lok =

Hong Kong footballer and coach

Kwok Kar Lok Kenneth 郭嘉諾
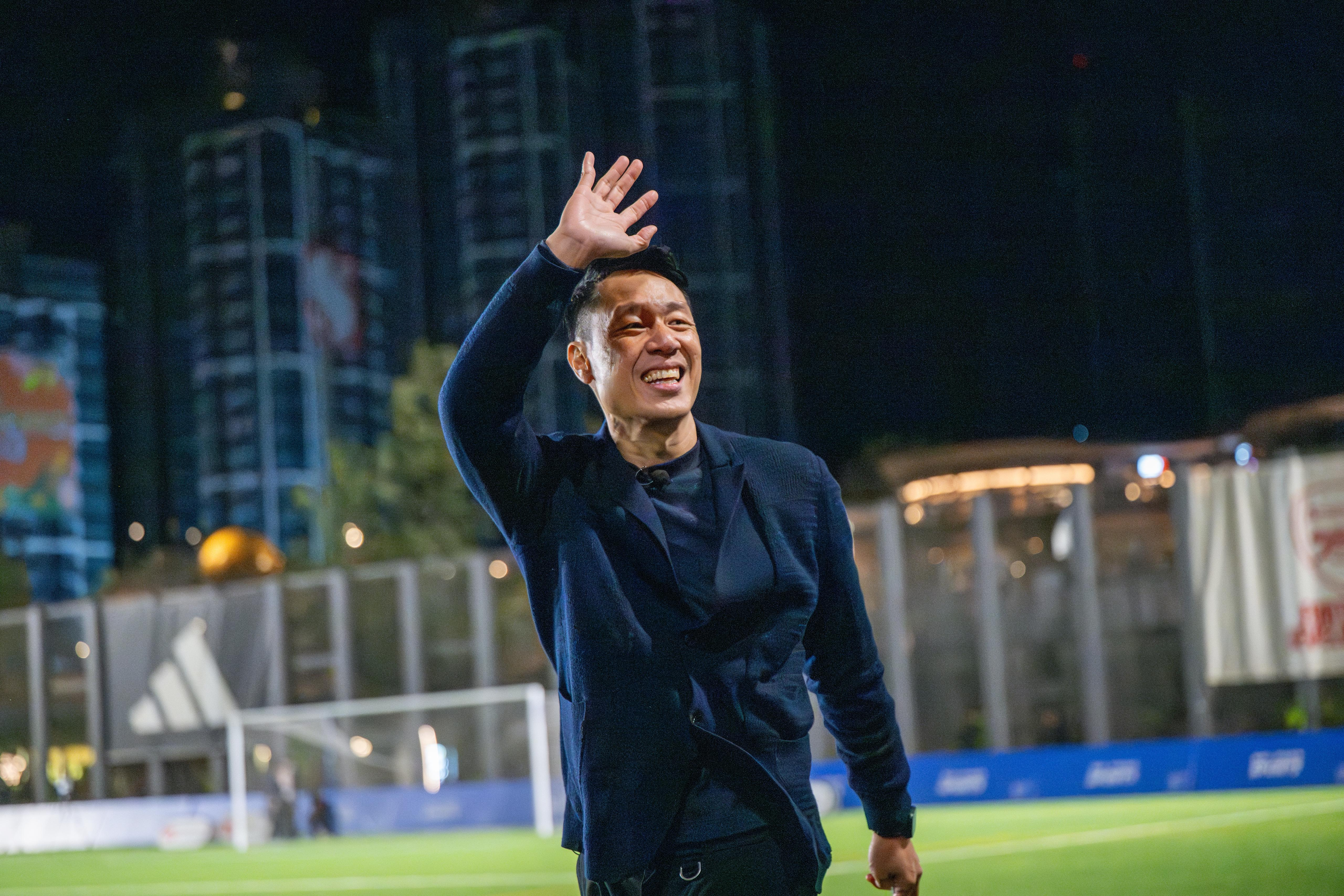

Personal information
- Full name: Kwok Kar Lok Kenneth
- Date of birth: 14 March 1980 (age 46)
- Place of birth: Hong Kong
- Height: 1.82 m (5 ft 11 1/2 in)
- Position: Centre back

Team information
- Current team: Sha Tin (head coach)

Senior career*
Years	Team	Apps	(Gls)
2007–2008	Lucky Mile		
2008–2011	HKFC	10	(2)

Managerial career
- 2012–2015: Pegasus (assistant coach)
- 2015–2018: Hong Kong U-20
- 2018: Hong Kong U-23
- 2018–2019: Yuen Long
- 2018–2019: Hong Kong (assistant coach)
- 2019: Tai Po
- 2020: Yuen Long
- 2020–2021: Pegasus
- 2022: Tainan City
- 2022–2023: Sham Shui Po
- 2024–2025: Macau
- 2026: Sha Tin
- * Club domestic league appearances and goals as of 7 November 2024

Kenneth Kwok Kar Lok (Chinese: 郭嘉諾; born 14 March 1980) is a Hong Kong football coach and former professional footballer.

Kwok is the son of former Taiwanese international Kwok Kam-hung.

== Club career ==
Kwok did not have a successful football playing career, while he only played professionally for the newly-promoted side HKFC in the 2010–11 season.

== Managerial career ==
=== Pegasus ===
In 2012, Kwok joined Pegasus as an assistant coach alongside Chan Chi Hong.

=== Hong Kong youth teams ===
In 2015, Kwok was appointed as the head coach of Hong Kong U-17 and Hong Kong U-20.

In August 2017, Kwok was appointed as the head coach of Hong Kong B, leading the team to defeat Macau in the 73rd Hong Kong–Macau Interport by 4–0. In December of the same year, he led the team to win the title of the 2018 Guangdong–Hong Kong Cup after beating Guangdong in the penalty shoot-out.

In April 2018, Kwok was appointed as the head coach of Hong Kong U-23 to participate in the 2018 Asian Games. His team was finally knocked out in the Round of 16.

In December 2018, he was appointed as the head coach of Hong Kong B again to play against Guangdong in the 2019 Guangdong–Hong Kong Cup. His team won 5–2 in aggregate eventually and successfully defended the champion.

=== Yuen Long ===
In July 2018, he was appointed as the head coach of Yuen Long. He led the club to finish 7th in the league, and his team was deemed as the overachiever of the league in the 2018–19 season. He left the club after the end of the season.

=== Tai Po ===
In July 2019, Kwok was appointed as the co-head coach of Tai Po, along with Fung Hoi Man. However, he resigned only three months later, in November 2019.

=== Second tenure at Yuen Long ===
On 1 February 2020, Kwok returned to Yuen Long, signing a contract until 31 May.

=== Second tenure at Pegasus ===
On 10 May 2020, Pegasus reached an agreement to hire Kwok as their next head coach. He signed a two-year contract with the club.

=== Tainan City ===
On 5 April 2022, Tainan City reached an agreement to hire Kwok as their next head coach.

=== Sham Shui Po ===
On 3 October 2022, Kwok was appointed as the head coach of Sham Shui Po.

=== Macau ===
On 7 November 2024, Kwok was appointed as the head coach of Macau.

On 30 November 2025, Kwok left as the head coach of Macau.

=== Sha Tin ===
On 16 July 2026, Kwok was appointed as the head coach of Sha Tin.
