= Chan Hiu Ming =

Hong Kong football manager

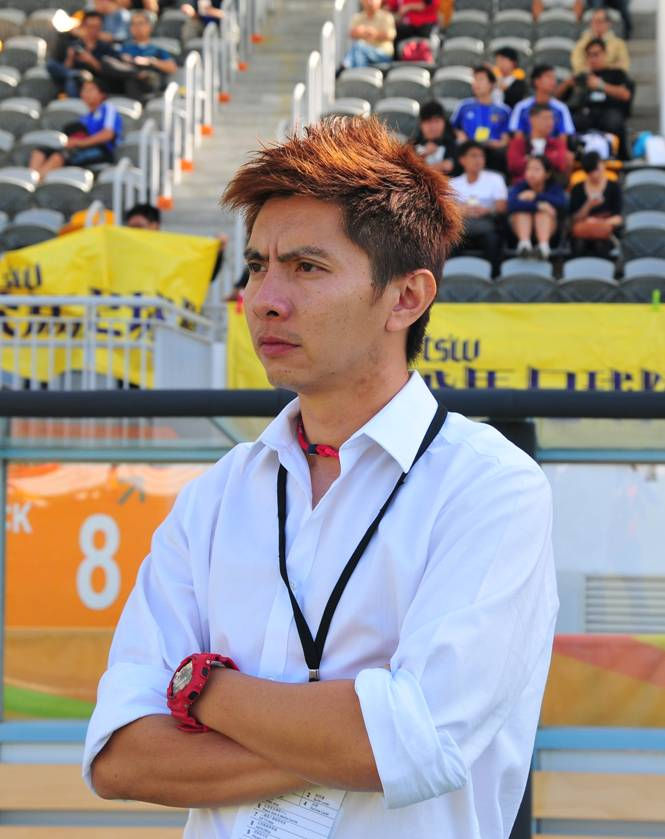

Personal information
- Full name: Chan Hiu Ming
- Date of birth: 19 March 1975 (age 51)
- Place of birth: Hong Kong

Team information
- Current team: Chinese Taipei (head coach)

Senior career*
Years	Team	Apps	(Gls)
1993–1994	Kitchee		
1994–1997	The University of Hong Kong		
1998–1999	Instant Dict		
1999–2000	Eastern		
2000–2001	Wong Tai Sin		
2001–2002	Derico		
2007–2009	University		
2009–2010	HKSS		
2010	ANP		

International career
2004–2006	Hong Kong (futsal)		

Managerial career
- 2004–2005: Hong Kong 08
- 2005–2006: Hong Kong 09
- 2006–2007: Tai Po
- 2007–2008: Workable
- 2007–2008: Hong Kong
- 2008–2009: Eastern
- 2010–2012: Pegasus
- 2016–2018: Macau (technical director)
- 2017–2018: Macau
- 2018–2023: Lee Man
- 2023–2025: Chinese Taipei (Women)
- * Club domestic league appearances and goals

Chan Hiu Ming (Chinese: 陳曉明; born 19 March 1975) is a Hong Kong professional football manager who last served as the head coach of Chinese Taipei.

He holds an AFC Pro License and is also a coaching and fitness instructor for the Asian Football Confederation and FIFA.

== Playing career ==
He was a member of Hong Kong national futsal team, and Hong Kong Hockey representative team. He also participated in different football clubs in Hong Kong including Kitchee, Instant Dict, Eastern, Wong Tai Sin and Derico for years.

== Managerial career ==
=== Hong Kong Youth Representative Team ===
Chan Hiu Ming started his managerial career in 2003 as the head coach of Hong Kong Youth Representative Team and assistant coach of Hong Kong Olympics Team. He succeeded with the Hong Kong Youth Representative Team as the team were crowned Champion of the International Invitation Tournament organised by the Hong Kong Football Association in 2004; Champion of the Lion City Cup organized by the Singapore Football Association in 2005 and the Champion of the International Invitation Tournament again in 2006.

=== Tai Po ===
Chan was appointed the head coach of Tai Po Football Club for the 2006–2007 season. In this season, he utilized the relatively inexperienced youth players such as Lee Wai Lim and Lee Hong Lim, who would later play for the senior national team. They finished the season in the 5th place, surpassing the expectations of critics and players alike.

=== Workable ===
Chan Hiu Ming was the team manager of Workable Football Club in 2007–2008. In this season, future stars Au Yeung Yiu Chung, Yapp Hung Fai, Tsang Man Fai and Tsang Kam To excelled under Chan's guidance, beating league heavyweights South China and Kitchee during his tenure as boss.

=== Eastern ===
Chan Hiu Ming was the team manager of Eastern Football Club in 2008–2009. In this season, he took the popularly supported club on a good run in the AFC cup as they beat Hanoi from Vietnam and Chonburi from Thailand.

=== HK Pegasus ===
Chan Hiu Ming was the head coach of TSW Pegasus Football Club in 2010–2012. The team finished his first season third in the league, and finished second the following season.

=== Macau ===
On 26 July 2017, Chan Hiu Ming took charge of Macau after Tam Iao San resigned citing family reasons.

=== Lee Man ===
On 21 May 2018, Lee Man announced that they hired Chan as their head coach.

On 5 February 2023, Chan was sacked by Lee Man.

=== Chinese Taipei ===
On 2 May 2023, Chan was appointed as the head coach of Chinese Taipei.
