= Fung Ka Ki =

Hong Kong footballer and coach

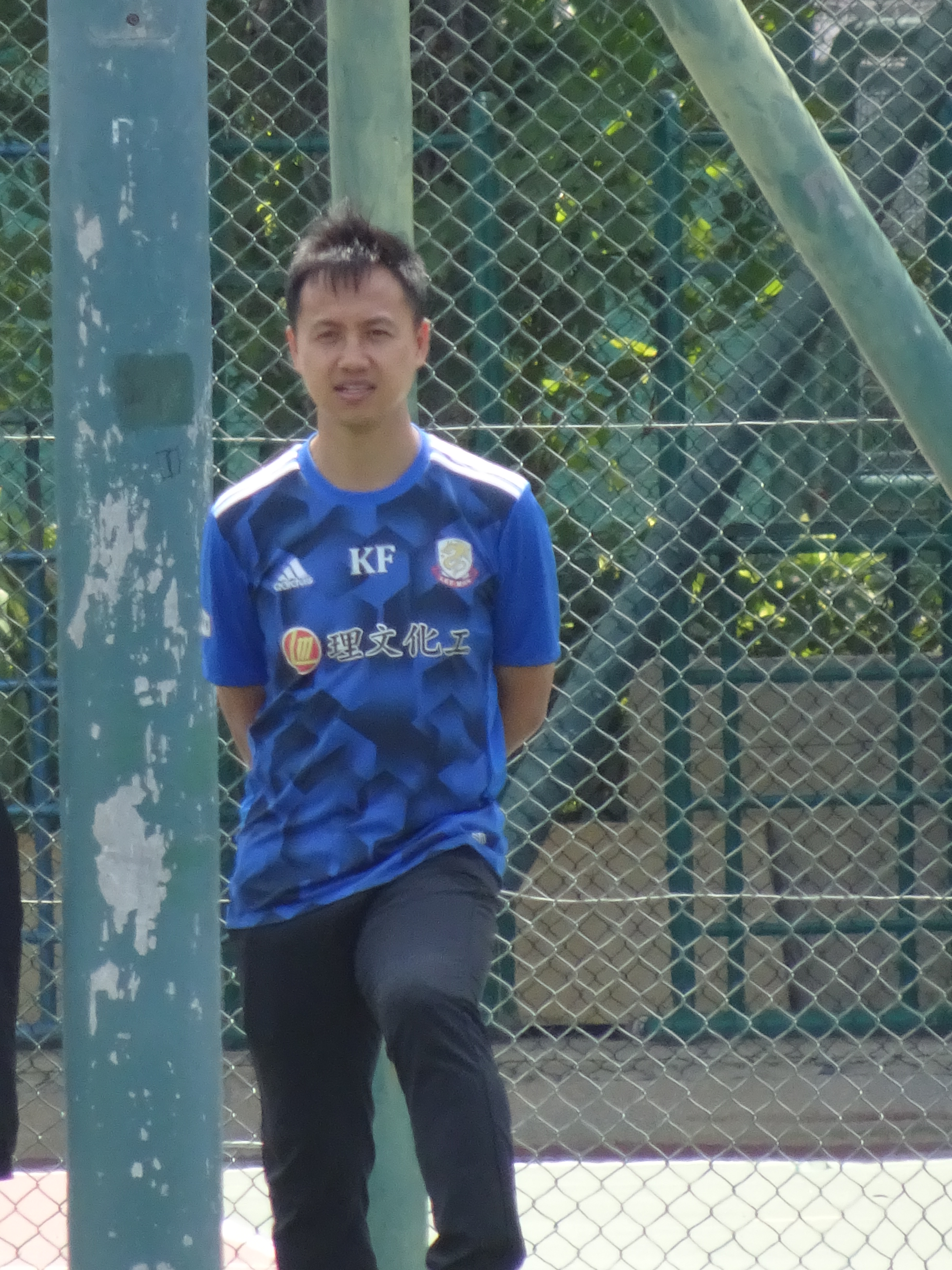

Personal information
- Full name: Fung Ka Ki
- Date of birth: 19 September 1977 (age 49)
- Place of birth: Hong Kong
- Height: 1.78 m (5 ft 10 in)
- Positions: Right back; centre back

Senior career*
Years	Team	Apps	(Gls)
1997–1998	Five-One-Seven		
1998–2001	Instant-Dict		
2001–2004	Buler Rangers		
2003–2004	→ Kitchee (loan)		
2004–2006	Kitchee		
2006–2008	Rangers (HKG)		
2008	Fourway		
2009	→ Mutual (loan)		
2010	Nailers Arms FC		

International career^{‡}
1990	Hong Kong U-15		
1993	Hong Kong U-18		
1997–1999	Hong Kong U-23		
1998–2000	Hong Kong		

Managerial career
- 2009–2010: Happy Valley (assistant coach)
- 2017–2018: Lee Man
- * Club domestic league appearances and goals as of 11 April 2008 ‡ National team caps and goals as of 11 April 2008

Fung Ka Ki (Chinese: 馮嘉奇; Jyutping: fung^{4} gaa^{1} kei^{4}; born 19 September 1977) is a Hong Kong football coach and former professional footballer.

== Club career ==
Fung was the team captain when he took part in 2000 Sydney Olympics Qualifiers, Rangers and Kitchee. He has also represented Hong Kong in FIFA international matches.

== Managerial career ==
=== Birmingham City ===
In 2010, Fung was hired by Birmingham City to be a financial officer following the takeover of the club by Hong Kong businessman Carson Yeung. He was often spotted in the stands on matchdays, sitting behind Yeung.

=== Lee Man ===
On 3 July 2017, it was revealed that Fung would be hired as the head coach of Lee Man for the 2017–18 season. On 10 April 2018, Fung confirmed that he had resigned with Lee Man in 8th place at the time.

== Personal information ==
Fung has been a football commentator in Cable TV Hong Kong since 2005, he mainly hosts programs for Bundesliga and Premier League.

During the 2006 FIFA World Cup, Fung hosted the program "Around the World in 80 Days" for Cable TV Hong Kong. In the episode, Fung and his crew travelled and visited 6 continents and 32 World Cup finalist participating countries. It is believed that the duration of his around-the-world travel shooting is more than 100 days.

During the 2008 Beijing Olympics, Fung hosted the program "Four Little Continues Strong" for Cable TV Hong Kong. In the episode, Fung and his crew focused on the passing of the Olympic torch relay in China. They visited and interviewed all the provinces throughout China.

Fung wrote and released a book, which is "Fung Ki's Football Journey", in August 2008. It is an autobiography of his life from his childhood days till 2008. It is published by Why Publishing. ISBN 978-962-678-532-4.
