= Lee & Man Paper =

Chinese paper-making company

Lee & Man Paper Manufacturing Limited 理文造纸有限公司
- Company type: Privately held company
- Industry: Papermaking
- Founded: 1994
- Headquarters: Dongguan, Guangdong, China
- Area served: China
- Key people: Chairman: Raymond Lee Man-chun; CEO: Lee Man-bun
- Products: Cardboard, Tissue, Paper products
- Revenue: $3B
- Number of employees: 40,000
- Subsidiaries: Ralison Intl.
- Website: Lee & Man Paper Manufacturing Limited

Lee & Man Paper Manufacturing Limited (SEHK: 2314) is a Hong Kong-listed Chinese private papermaking company engaged in the manufacturing of packaging paper, such as linerboard and containerboard, and wood pulp. It has paper production plants in Guangdong, Jiangsu and Jiangxi provinces, as well as in the city of Chongqing and in Vietnam. The company employs about 4,000 people. It was established in 1994 and listed on the Hong Kong Stock Exchange in 2003.
