= Yuen Long F.C. =

Hong Kong football club

Yuen Long 元朗
- Full name: Yuen Long Football Club 元朗足球隊
- Nicknames: The Tangerines; Squire team (鄉紳班)
- Founded: 1959 (as Yuen Long District Sport Association); 2013 (as Yuen Long Football Club)
- Ground: Tin Yip Road Park
- President: Wilson Wong
- Chairman: Wong Tak Sun
- Head coach: Yip Tsz Chun
- League: Hong Kong First Division
- 2025–26: First Division, 8th of 14
- Website: www.facebook.com/BestUnionYUENLONG/
| Home colours | Away colours |

Yuen Long Football Club (Chinese: 元朗足球隊), known as Best Union Yuen Long (Chinese: 佳聯元朗) for sponsorship reasons, is a Hong Kong professional football club based in Yuen Long which currently competes in the Hong Kong First Division.

The football teams of the club were originally organised by Yuen Long District Sports Association (Chinese: 元朗區體育會). In 2013, Yuen Long Football Club was established as a private entity, separate from the district sports association.

== History ==
Yuen Long District Sport Association was established by former chairmen of Hong Kong Football Association, Fu Lee Sha and Tsang Sam Chiu in 1959.

The team entered the former Hong Kong Third Division in 1959–60 season. The team carried a three-year plan to get promotion to Hong Kong First Division. In 1961–62, the team became the first district team to compete in First Division. In 1962–63, the team gained their first top Division League title. In 1967–68, the team captured their first Senior Shield by beating Tung Sing. In 1968–69, the team turned professional until 1972–73 when it focused on a youth squad. In 1978–79, the team beat the league giant Seiko in FA Cup final, which avoided Seiko from capturing all the 6 major trophies in the season. In 1979–80, the team quit the league due to financial problems.

With the creation of the Hong Kong Third District Division, Yuen Long was reformed and entered the league in 2003.

They were promoted to the First Division in the 2013–14 season, as champions of the Hong Kong Second Division, seven points ahead the runner-up Happy Valley. From 2013 to 2015, they were branded as I Sky Yuen Long due to the sponsorship from Simsen International Corporation Limited.

Yuen Long were branded as KMB Yuen Long between 2015 and 2017 due to a sponsorship agreement with Kowloon Motor Bus. The agreement was terminated in June 2017. Ahead of the 2017–18 season, Yuen Long announced a sponsorship agreement with Sun Bus and rebranded as Sun Bus Yuen Long. The club captured their first Senior Shield in 50 years, when they defeated Eastern 3–0 in the final. However, despite winning silverware, Sun Bus dropped their sponsorship of the club at the end of the season. Eventually on 24 May 2018, club chairman Wilson Wong announced that the club had secured enough funding to continue in the Hong Kong Premier League for 2018–19, although the club would have to rebuild their squad with mostly U-23 players.

Ahead of the 2018–19 season, Yuen Long were confirmed as Best Union Yuen Long for sponsorship reasons.

On 12 June 2020, after 7 consecutive seasons in the top-flight, Yuen Long confirmed their withdrawal from participating in the 2020–21 HKPL season due to lack of funds after the 2020 coronavirus pandemic in Hong Kong. They would be playing in the Hong Kong First Division League in the new season.

== Name history ==
- 1960–2013: Yuen Long (元朗)
- 2013–2015: I Sky Yuen Long (天行元朗)
- 2015–2016: Yuen Long (元朗)
- 2016–2017：KMB Yuen Long (九巴元朗)
- 2017–2018：Sun Bus Yuen Long (陽光元朗)
- 2018–2020：Best Union Yuen Long (佳聯元朗)
- 2020–2021：Yuen Long (元朗)
- 2021–：Best Union Yuen Long (佳聯元朗)

== Honours ==
=== League ===
- Hong Kong First Division
  - Champions (1): 1962–63
- Hong Kong Second Division
  - Champions (1): 2012–13

=== Cup ===
- Hong Kong Senior Shield
  - Champions (2): 1967–68, 2017–18
- Hong Kong FA Cup
  - Champions (1): 1978–79

== Managers ==
- (Hong Kong) Chan Ho Yin (2012–2015)
- (Hong Kong) Fung Hoi Man (2015–2016)
- (Hong Kong) Tsang Chiu Tat (2016–2018)
- (Hong Kong) Kwok Kar Lok (2018–2019)
- (Hong Kong) Chan Man Chun (2019–2020)
- (Hong Kong) Kwok Kar Lok (2020)
- (Hong Kong) Yip Tsz Chun (2020–present)

== Notable players ==
- Chan Fat Chi (陳發枝)
- Cheung Chi Doy (張子岱)
- Cheung Yiu Tung (張耀東)
- Leung Nang Yan (梁能仁)
- Win Won Soon

== See also ==
- Pegasus
