= 2020–21 Kitchee SC season =

Kitchee 2020–21 season
- President: Ken Ng
- Head Coach: Chu Chi Kwong
- Stadium: Mong Kok Stadium
- Premier League: Champions
- Senior Shield: Cancelled
- FA Cup: Cancelled
- Sapling Cup: Semi-finals
- Community Cup: Cancelled
- AFC Champions League: Group Stage
Home colours	Away colours

The 2020–21 season is Kitchee's 42nd season in the top-tier division in Hong Kong football. Kitchee has competed in the Premier League, Senior Challenge Shield, FA Cup, Sapling Cup and AFC Champions League this season.

== Squad ==
=== First Team ===
As of 21 June 2021

Note: Flags indicate national team as defined under FIFA eligibility rules; some limited exceptions apply. Players may hold more than one non-FIFA nationality.

No.	Pos.	Nation	Player
1	GK	HKG	Wang Zhenpeng
2	DF	HKG	Law Tsz Chun
3	DF	HKG	Dani Cancela
5	DF	HKG	Hélio
6	DF	KOR	Park Jun-heong ^{FP}
7	FW	BRA	Wellingsson ^{FP}
8	FW	HKG	Matt Orr
9	FW	MNE	Dejan Damjanović ^{FP}
10	MF	BRA	Cleiton ^{FP}
11	FW	ESP	Manuel Gavilán ^{FP}
12	DF	BRA	Tomas ^{FP}
14	MF	HKG	Ho Chun Ting
15	DF	HKG	Roberto
16	MF	HKG	Ngan Cheuk Pan
19	MF	HKG	Huang Yang (captain)
20	MF	HKG	Sohgo Ichikawa
21	DF	HKG	Tong Kin Man

No.	Pos.	Nation	Player
22	DF	FRA	Clement Benhaddouche ^{LP}
23	GK	HKG	Guo Jianqiao
24	MF	HKG	Ju Yingzhi
27	MF	HKG	Bosley Yu
28	FW	HKG	Cheng Chin Lung
30	FW	HKG	Chang Kwong Yin
33	DF	HKG	Sean Tse
34	MF	ISR	Barak Braunshtain ^{LP}
35	MF	PHI	Mark Swainston ^{LP}
36	FW	HKG	Tong Hew Fung
37	MF	ESP	Raúl Baena ^{FP}
38	MF	HKG	Alexandre Dujardin
67	FW	HKG	Seb Buddle
86	GK	HKG	Paulo César
88	FW	HKG	Alex Akande
95	FW	HKG	Shinichi Chan

Remarks:
^{LP} These players are considered as local players in Hong Kong domestic football competitions.
^{FP} These players are registered as foreign players.

== Transfers ==
=== Transfers in ===
Date from	Position	Nationality	Name	From	Fee	Ref.
October 2020	GK	(Hong Kong)	Chan Ka Ho	Lee Man	End of loan	
20 November 2020	DF	(Hong Kong)	Alexandre Dujardin	Free agent	Free	
10 December 2020	MF	(Spain)	Raúl Baena	(Greece) Atromitos F.C.	Free	
9 January 2021	FW	(Montenegro)	Dejan Damjanović	(South Korea) Daegu FC	Free	
17 February 2021	DF	(Hong Kong)	Roberto	R&F	Free	
17 February 2021	DF	(Hong Kong)	Sean Tse	R&F	Free	
30 March 2021	FW	(Hong Kong)	Alex Akande	Dalian Pro	Free	

=== Transfers out ===
Date from	Position	Nationality	Name	To	Fee	Ref.
20 October 2020	FW	(Spain)	Manolo Bleda	Lee Man	Released	
20 October 2020	FW	(Serbia)	Nikola Komazec	(Slovakia) FC Košice	Released	
October 2020	GK	(Hong Kong)	Chan Ka Ho	Lee Man	Released	
12 February 2021	DF	(Hong Kong)	Li Ngai Hoi	(China) Nantong Zhiyun	¥1,000,000	
9 April 2021	MF	(Hong Kong)	Peng Lin Lin	Unattached	Released	
9 April 2021	DF	(Hong Kong)	Luk Kin Ming	Unattached	Released	

=== Loans Out ===
Start Date	End Date	Position	Nationality	Name	To Club	Fee	Ref.
17 November 2020	End of season	GK	(Hong Kong)	Wong Tsz Chung	Sham Shui Po	Undisclosed	

== Club officials ==
=== Club Senior staff ===
Position	Name
President	(Hong Kong) Ken Ng
General manager	(Australia) Wilson Ng
Public Relations Manager	(Canada) Ng Yee Yun
Director of Marketing	(Hong Kong) Lo Shuk Ting
Director of Football	(Hong Kong) Chu Chi Kwong
Assistant Director of Football	(Hong Kong) Leung Chi Wing
Competition Manager	(Hong Kong) Chiu Yun Shing
Customer Service Manager	(Hong Kong) Cheng Ching Yu

=== Coaching staff ===
Position	Name
Head coach	(Hong Kong) Chu Chi Kwong (caretaker)
Assistant Coach	(South Korea) Kim Dong-jin
Goalkeeping Coach	(Spain) Roberto Sambade Carreira
Fitness Coach	(South Korea) Bae Ji-won
Director of Youth Development	(Hong Kong) Chu Chi Kwong
Head of Recovery & Regeneration	(Catalonia) Pau MP
Trainer & Youth Team Coach	(South Korea) Yoon Dong-hun
Club Physiotherapist	(Hong Kong) Ngai Chi Wing
Team Assistant	(Hong Kong) Lee Wing Po
Reserve Team Coach	(South Korea) Bae Ji-won
U18 Team Coach	(South Korea) Bae Ji-won
U16 Team Coach	(South Korea) Yoon Dong-hun
U15 Team Coach	(South Korea) Kim Dong-jin
U14 Team Coach	(Hong Kong) Gao Wen
U13 Team Coach	(Hong Kong) Chu Chi Kwong
U12 Team Coach	(South Korea) Yoon Dong-hun
U11 Team Coach	(Hong Kong) Tong Kin Man
Club Doctor	(Hong Kong) Dr. Yung Shu Hang
Kitchee Academy director	(Hong Kong) Chu Chi Kwong
Kitchee Academy Coach	(Hong Kong) Gao Wen, (England) Tim Bredbury, (Hong Kong) Yau Kin Wai
Professional Footballer Preparatory Programme Coach	(Hong Kong) Chu Chi Kwong

== Competitions ==
=== Hong Kong Premier League ===
==== Table ====
Pos	Team	Pld	W	D	L	GF	GA	GD	Pts	Qualification or relegation (Note: Teams play each other twice (14 matches), before the league is split into two groups (the top four and the bottom four).)
1	Kitchee (C)	17	11	4	2	32	12	+20	37	Qualification for AFC Champions League Group Stage
2	Eastern	17	10	4	3	38	16	+22	34	Qualification for AFC Cup Group Stage
3	Lee Man	17	9	3	5	34	21	+13	30	Qualification for AFC Cup Qualifying Play-offs
4	Pegasus (D, R)	17	9	1	7	23	27	−4	28	Relegation to Hong Kong Third Division League (Note: Pegasus announced that they would self-relegate to the third division due to lack of funds.)
5	Southern	17	4	4	9	29	35	−6	16 (Note: Head-to head points: Southern 5, Rangers 2)	

Source: Hong Kong Football Association
Rules for classification: 1) Points; 2) Head-to-head points; 3) Head-to-head goal difference; 4) Head-to-head goals scored; 5) Goal difference; 6) Goals scored; 7) Fair-play points; 8) Drawing lots (Play-off if the winner has to be decided).
(C) Champions; (D) Disqualified; (R) Relegated

==== Results by round ====
Round	1	2
Ground	H	H
Result	D	D

Updated to match(es) played on 29 November 2020. Source: Competitive Matches
A = Away; H = Home; W = Win; D = Draw; L = Loss; X = Cancel

==== Results summary ====
Overall								Home						Away					
Pld	W	D	L	GF	GA	GD	Pts	W	D	L	GF	GA	GD	W	D	L	GF	GA	GD
2	0	2	0	3	3	0	2	0	2	0	3	3	0	0	0	0	0	0	0

Last updated: 29 November 2020.
Source: Competitive Matches

==== League Matches ====
On 2 November 2020, the fixtures for the forthcoming season were announced.

22 November 2020 1	Kitchee	2–2	Lee Man	Mong Kok, Kowloon
17:30 (UTC+8)	Matt Orr 26'; Li Ngai Hoi 45+3'	Report	Shapoval 31'; Acosta 50'	Stadium: Mong Kok Stadium; Attendance: 1,775; Referee: Yu Kin Fung

29 November 2020 2	Kitchee	1–1	Happy Valley	Mong Kok, Kowloon
15:00 (UTC+8)	Li Ngai Hoi 74'	Report	Odu 18'	Stadium: Mong Kok Stadium; Attendance: 1,407; Referee: Lau Fong Hei

=== Hong Kong Sapling Cup ===
==== Group stage ====
Pos	Team	Pld	W	D	L	GF	GA	GD	Pts	Qualification
1	Lee Man	6	3	3	0	11	2	+9	12	Advance to Semi-finals
2	Kitchee	6	3	3	0	11	4	+7	12	Advance to Semi-finals
3	Pegasus	6	2	1	3	8	14	−6	7	
4	Rangers	6	0	1	5	6	16	−10	1	

Source: Hong Kong Football Association
Rules for classification: 1) Points; 2) Head-to-head points; 3) Head-to-head goal difference; 4) Goal difference; 5) Goals scored.

25 October 2020 1	Kitchee	3–0	Rangers	Yuen Long, New Territories
17:30	Matt Orr 6', 31', 58'	Report		Stadium: Yuen Long Stadium; Attendance: 0 Referee: Wong Wai Lun

31 October 2020 2	Lee Man	0–0	Kitchee	Diamond Hill, Kowloon
15:00		Report		Stadium: Hammer Hill Road Sports Ground; Attendance: 0 Referee: Ng Chiu Kok

4 November 2020 3	Pegasus	0–0	Kitchee	Mong Kok, Kowloon
20:00		Report		Stadium: Mong Kok Stadium; Attendance: 0 Referee: Tam Ping Wun

8 November 2020 4	Rangers	3–5	Kitchee	Mong Kok, Kowloon
17:30	Juninho 4'; Lam Ka Wai 12'; Lam Hok Hei 67'	Report	Matt Orr 29', 45', 51'; Buddle 54'; Gavilán 78' (pen.)	Stadium: Mong Kok Stadium; Attendance: 694; Referee: Law Bik Chi

14 November 2020 5	Kitchee	0–0	Lee Man	Tsing Yi, New Territories
17:30		Report		Stadium: Tsing Yi Sports Ground; Attendance: 654; Referee: Lau Fong Hei

=== Hong Kong FA Cup ===
==== Group stage ====
Pos	Team	Pld	W	D	L	GF	GA	GD	Pts	Qualification
1	Eastern	0	0	0	0	0	0	0	0	Advance to Semi-finals
2	Happy Valley	0	0	0	0	0	0	0	0	Advance to Semi-finals
3	Kitchee	0	0	0	0	0	0	0	0	
4	Southern	0	0	0	0	0	0	0	0	

Source: Hong Kong Football Association
Rules for classification: 1) Points; 2) Head-to-head points; 3) Head-to-head goal difference; 4) Goal difference; 5) Goals scored.

=== AFC Champions League ===
==== Group stage ====
Pos	Team	Pld	W	D	L	GF	GA	GD	Pts	Qualification	CER	KIT	POR	GZH
1	(Japan) Cerezo Osaka	6	4	2	0	13	2	+11	14	Advance to Round of 16	—	2–1	1–1	5–0
2	(Hong Kong) Kitchee	6	3	2	1	6	3	+3	11		0–0	—	2–0	1–0
3	(Thailand) Port (H)	6	2	2	2	10	8	+2	8		0–3	1–1	—	3–0
4	(China) Guangzhou	6	0	0	6	1	17	−16	0		0–2	0–1	1–5	—

Source: AFC
Rules for classification: Tiebreakers
(H) Hosts

24 June 2021 1	Kitchee (Hong Kong)	2–0	(Thailand) Port	Buriram Stadium, Buriram
17:00 UTC+7	Roberto Orlando Affonso Júnior 37'; Dejan Damjanović 79'; Park Jun-heong (yellow card) 28'; Huang Yang (yellow card) 46'; Cleiton (yellow card) 71'	Report	Siwakorn Jakkuprasat (yellow card) 3'; John Baggio (yellow card) 11'	Referee: Kim Dae-yong (South Korea)

27 June 2021 2	Cerezo Osaka (Japan)	v	(Hong Kong) Kitchee	Buriram Stadium, Buriram
17:00 UTC+7

30 June 2021 3	Guangzhou (China)	v	(Hong Kong) Kitchee	Buriram Stadium, Buriram
17:00 UTC+7

3 July 2021 4	Kitchee (Hong Kong)	v	(China) Guangzhou	Buriram Stadium, Buriram
17:00 UTC+7

6 July 2021 5	Port (Thailand)	v	(Hong Kong) Kitchee	Buriram Stadium, Buriram
21:00 UTC+7

9 July 2021 6	Kitchee (Hong Kong)	v	(Japan) Cerezo Osaka	Buriram Stadium, Buriram
21:00 UTC+7
