= 2019–20 Kitchee SC season =

Kitchee 2019–20 season
- President: Ken Ng
- Head Coach: Chu Chi Kwong
- Stadium: Mong Kok Stadium
- Premier League: Champions
- Senior Shield: Quarter-finals
- FA Cup: Quarter-finals
- Sapling Cup: Champions
- Community Cup: Cancelled
- AFC Cup: Cancelled
- Highest home attendance: 2,772 (vs Happy Valley, 30 August 2019)
- Lowest home attendance: 1,483 (vs Pegasus, 30 December 2019)
Home colours	Away colours

The 2019–20 season is Kitchee's 41st season in the top-tier division of Hong Kong football. Kitchee has competed in the Premier League, Senior Challenge Shield, FA Cup, Sapling Cup and AFC Cup this season.

== Squad ==
=== First Team ===
As of 24 September 2020

Note: Flags indicate national team as defined under FIFA eligibility rules; some limited exceptions apply. Players may hold more than one non-FIFA nationality.

No.	Pos.	Nation	Player
1	GK	HKG	Wang Zhenpeng
3	DF	HKG	Dani Cancela
4	DF	HKG	Li Ngai Hoi
5	DF	HKG	Hélio
6	DF	KOR	Park Jun-heong ^{FP}
8	DF	HKG	Matt Orr
9	FW	ESP	Manuel Bleda ^{FP}
10	MF	BRA	Cleiton ^{FP}
11	FW	BRA	Wellingsson ^{FP}
12	DF	BRA	Tomas ^{FP}
13	DF	HKG	Luk Kin Ming
14	MF	HKG	Ho Chun Ting
15	DF	HKG	Brian Fok
17	GK	HKG	Wong Tsz Chung
18	FW	SRB	Nikola Komazec ^{FP}
19	MF	HKG	Huang Yang (captain)
20	MF	HKG	Sohgo Ichikawa

No.	Pos.	Nation	Player
21	DF	HKG	Tong Kin Man
22	MF	FRA	Clement Benhaddouche ^{LP}
23	GK	HKG	Guo Jianqiao
24	MF	HKG	Ju Yingzhi
26	MF	HKG	Peng Lin Lin
27	MF	HKG	Bosley Yu
28	MF	HKG	Cheng Chin Lung
29	FW	ESP	Manuel Gavilán ^{FP}
30	FW	HKG	Chang Kwong Yin
31	DF	HKG	Law Tsz Chun
34	MF	ISR	Barak Braunshtain ^{LP}
35	MF	PHI	Mark Swainston ^{LP}
37	FW	HKG	Tong Hew Fung
67	FW	HKG	Seb Buddle
95	MF	HKG	Shinichi Chan
–	MF	HKG	Ngan Cheuk Pan
–	GK	BRA	Paulo César ^{FP}

Remarks:
^{LP} These players are considered as local players in Hong Kong domestic football competitions.
^{FP} These players are registered as foreign players.

== Transfers ==
=== Transfers in ===
Date from	Position	Nationality	Name	From	Fee	Ref.
1 July 2019	GK	(Hong Kong)	Chan Ka Ho	Yuen Long	End of loan	
1 July 2019	GK	(Brazil)	Paulo César	Hoi King	End of loan	
1 July 2019	MF	(Hong Kong)	Ho Chun Ting	Hoi King	End of loan	
1 July 2019	MF	(Hong Kong)	Seb Buddle	Hoi King	End of loan	
1 July 2019	MF	(Philippines) (Hong Kong)	Mark Swainston	Hoi King	End of loan	
3 July 2019	FW	(Brazil)	Souza	Southern	Free	
3 July 2019	FW	(Spain)	Manolo Bleda	Eastern	Free	
3 July 2019	MF	(Brazil)	Cleiton	Yuen Long	Free	
16 July 2019	DF	(Hong Kong)	Brian Fok	(China) Shanghai Shenhua	Free	
September 2019	MF	(Hong Kong)	Chang Kwong Yin	Youth team	Free	
September 2019	MF	(Hong Kong)	Tong Hew Fung	Youth team	Free	
27 December 2019	FW	(Serbia)	Nikola Komazec	Southern	Free	
27 December 2019	DF	(South Korea)	Park Jun-heong	(South Korea) Suwon Samsung Bluewings	Free	
27 December 2019	MF	(Hong Kong)	Matt Orr	(United States) Syracuse Orange	Free	
5 February 2020	FW	(Hong Kong)	Godfred Karikari	Free agent	Free	
1 June 2020	MF	(Hong Kong)	Yuto Nakamura	Lee Man	End of loan	
2 July 2020	DF	(Brazil)	Tomas Maronesi	Rangers	Free	
2 July 2020	DF	(Hong Kong)	Luk Kin Ming	Rangers	Free	
2 July 2020	MF	(Hong Kong)	Peng Lin Lin	Rangers	Free	
2 July 2020	MF	(Hong Kong)	Ngan Cheuk Pan	(United States) St. Bonaventure Bonnies	Free	
2 July 2020	MF	(Hong Kong)	Ho Chun Ting	Tai Po	End of loan	
2 July 2020	FW	(Spain)	Manuel Gavilán	Happy Valley	Free	
July 2020	MF	(Hong Kong)	Sohgo Ichikawa	Youth team	Free	

=== Transfers out ===
Date from	Position	Nationality	Name	To	Fee	Ref.
1 July 2019	GK	(Hong Kong)	Wong Tsz Ho	Yuen Long	Released	
1 July 2019	DF	(Hong Kong)	Fernando Recio	Lee Man	Released	
1 July 2019	DF	(Hong Kong)	Chau Hin Shing	Lee Man	Released	
1 July 2019	DF	(Australia)	Matt Smith	(Australia) Brisbane City	Released	
1 July 2019	MF	(Hong Kong)	Au Man Lok	South China	Released	
1 July 2019	MF	(Canada) (Hong Kong)	Matt Lam	R&F	Released	
1 July 2019	MF	(United States)	Jonathan Hernandez	Unattached	Released	
1 July 2019	MF	(Brazil)	Robert	Unattached	Released	
1 July 2019	FW	(Hong Kong)	Jordi Tarrés	Lee Man	Released	
1 July 2019	FW	(Hong Kong)	Hirokane Harima	Eastern	Released	
1 July 2019	FW	(Hong Kong)	Christian Annan	Rangers	Released	
1 July 2019	FW	(Croatia)	Josip Tadić	(Lithuania) FK Sūduva	Released	
27 August 2019	MF	(Hungary)	Krisztián Vadócz	(Hungary) Honvéd	Released	
20 December 2019	FW	(Brazil)	Lucas Silva	Eastern	Released	
1 June 2020	FW	(Brazil)	Fernando	Eastern	Released	
1 June 2020	MF	(Hong Kong)	Yuto Nakamura	Lee Man	Released	
1 July 2020	MF	(Australia) (Hong Kong)	Jared Lum	R&F	Released	
1 July 2020	FW	(Hong Kong)	Godfred Karikari	Unattached	Released	

=== Loans Out ===
Start Date	End Date	Position	Nationality	Name	To Club	Fee	Ref.
3 August 2019	31 May 2020	GK	(Hong Kong)	Chan Ka Ho	Yuen Long	Undisclosed	
16 September 2019	31 December 2019	GK	(Brazil)	Paulo César	Tai Po	Undisclosed	
16 September 2019	31 May 2020	MF	(Hong Kong)	Ho Chun Ting	Tai Po	Undisclosed	
25 September 2019	31 May 2020	MF	(Hong Kong)	Yuto Nakamura	Tai Po	Undisclosed	
3 July 2020	End of season	GK	(Hong Kong)	Chan Ka Ho	Lee Man	Undisclosed	

== Club officials ==
=== Club Senior staff ===
Position	Name
President	(Hong Kong) Ken Ng
General Manager	(Australia) Wilson Ng
Public Relations Manager	(Canada) Ng Yee Yun
Director of Marketing	(Hong Kong) Lo Shuk Ting
Club Advisor	(Bosnia and Herzegovina) Blaž Slišković
Assistant Director of Football	(Hong Kong) Leung Chi Wing
Competition Manager	(Hong Kong) Chiu Yun Shing
Customer Service Manager	(Hong Kong) Cheng Ching Yu

=== Club Coach staff ===
Position	Name
Head coach	(Bosnia and Herzegovina) Blaž Slišković (3 July 2019 – 23 March 2020) (Hong Kong) Chu Chi Kwong (23 March 2020 – 11 October 2020)
Assistant Coach (Attack)	(Spain) Roberto Losada
Assistant Coach (Defence)	(South Korea) Kim Dong-jin
Goalkeeping Coach	(Spain) Roberto Sambade Carreira
Fitness Coach	(South Korea) Bae Ji-won
Director of Youth Development	(Hong Kong) Chu Chi Kwong
Head of Recovery & Regeneration	(Spain) Pau MP
Trainer & Youth Team Coach	(South Korea) Yoon Dong-hun
Club Physiotherapist	(Hong Kong) Ngai Chi Wing
Team Assistant	(Hong Kong) Lee Wing Po
Reserve Team Coach	(Hong Kong) Chu Chi Kwong, (Spain) Roberto Losada, (South Korea) Bae Ji-won
U18 Team Coach	(Hong Kong) Chu Chi Kwong, (Spain) Roberto Losada, (South Korea) Bae Ji-won
U16 Team Coach	(South Korea) Yoon Dong-hun
U15 Team Coach	(South Korea) Kim Dong-jin
U14 Team Coach	(Hong Kong) Gao Wen
U13 Team Coach	(Hong Kong) Chu Chi Kwong
U12 Team Coach	(South Korea) Yoon Dong-hun
U11 Team Coach	(Hong Kong) Tong Kin Man
Club Doctor	(Hong Kong) Dr. Yung Shu Hang
Kitchee Academy director	(Spain) Roberto Losada
Kitchee Academy Coach	(Hong Kong) Gao Wen, (England) Tim Bredbury, (Hong Kong) Yau Kin Wai
Professional Footballer Preparatory Programme Coach	(Hong Kong) Chu Chi Kwong

== Competitions ==
=== Hong Kong Premier League ===
==== Table ====
Pos	Team	Pld	W	D	L	GF	GA	GD	Pts	Qualification or relegation
1	Kitchee (C)	10	6	2	2	25	10	+15	20	Qualification for AFC Champions League group stage
2	Eastern	10	6	1	3	16	8	+8	19	Qualification for AFC Cup group stage
3	(China) R&F (D)	10	5	3	2	21	15	+6	18	Withdrew from league system, club folded (Note: R&F withdrew from the league system after the end of the season and folded.)
4	Lee Man	10	5	1	4	16	14	+2	16	Qualification for AFC Cup group stage
5	Southern	10	2	4	4	15	21	−6	10	

Source: Hong Kong Football Association
Rules for classification: 1) Points; 2) Head-to-head points; 3) Head-to-head goal difference; 4) Head-to-head goals scored; 5) Goal difference; 6) Goals scored; 7) Fair-play points; 8) Drawing lots (Play-off if the winner has to be decided).
(C) Champions; (D) Disqualified
Notes:

Win Draw Loss

==== Results by round ====
Round	1	2	3	4	5	6	7	8	9	10	11	12	13	14	15	16	17	18
Ground	H	H	A	A	A	A	H	H	H	A	H	A	A	H	A	H	H	A
Result	W	D	L	W	D	D	W	D	W	W	X	W	L	W	W	X	D	X

Updated to match(es) played on 11 October 2020. Source: Competitive Matches
A = Away; H = Home; W = Win; D = Draw; L = Loss; X = Cancel

==== Results summary ====
Overall								Home						Away					
Pld	W	D	L	GF	GA	GD	Pts	W	D	L	GF	GA	GD	W	D	L	GF	GA	GD
15	8	5	2	34	15	+19	29	4	3	0	15	6	+9	4	2	2	19	9	+10

Last updated: 11 October 2020.
Source: Competitive Matches

==== League Matches ====
On 14 August 2019, the fixtures for the forthcoming season were announced.

30 August 2019 1	Kitchee	5–0	Happy Valley	Mong Kok, Kowloon
20:00 (UTC+8)	Bleda 16'; Lucas Silva 28'; Cleiton 38'; Fernando 49' (pen.); Wellingsson 71'	Report		Stadium: Mong Kok Stadium; Attendance: 2,772; Referee: Tam Ping Wun

14 September 2019 2	Kitchee	2–2	Yuen Long	Mong Kok, Kowloon
17:30 (UTC+8)	Lum 44'; Bleda 59'	Report	Wang Ruei 56'; Tsang Tsz Hin 69'	Stadium: Mong Kok Stadium; Attendance: 1,546; Referee: Tang Hing Fu

18 March 2020 3	Lee Man	2–1	Kitchee	Mong Kok, Kowloon
14:30 (UTC+8)	N'dri 88' (pen.), 90+3'	Report	Komazec 66'	Stadium: Mong Kok Stadium; Attendance: 0 Referee: Tam Ping Wun

10 March 2020 4	Southern	1–5	Kitchee	Tseung Kwan O, New Territories
14:30 (UTC+8)	Major 87'	Report	Chan Kong Pan 14' (o.g.); Shinichi Chan 49'; Park Jun-heong 60'; Bleda 62', 74'	Stadium: Tseung Kwan O Sports Ground; Attendance: 0 Referee: Tam Ping Wun

19 October 2019 5	Tai Po	1–1	Kitchee	Tai Po, New Territories
14:30 (UTC+8)	Sandro 20'	Report	Ju Yingzhi 74'	Stadium: Tai Po Sports Ground; Attendance: 1,026; Referee: Luk Kin Sun

3 November 2019 6	Rangers	1–1	Kitchee	Tuen Mun, New Territories
14:30 (UTC+8)	Aender 90+5' (pen.)	Report	Lum 27'	Stadium: Tuen Mun Tang Shiu Kin Sports Ground; Attendance: 452; Referee: Wong Wai Lun

24 November 2019 7	Kitchee	3–1	Eastern	Mong Kok, Kowloon
14:30 (UTC+8)	Li Ngai Hoi 44'; Fernando 47'; Cheng Chin Lung 52'	Report	Lam Ka Wai 37'	Stadium: Mong Kok Stadium; Attendance: 1,993; Referee: Yu Kin Fung

29 November 2019 8	Kitchee	0–0	R&F	Mong Kok, Kowloon
20:00 (UTC+8)		Report		Stadium: Mong Kok Stadium; Attendance: 1,823; Referee: Ng Chiu Kok

30 December 2019 9	Kitchee	2–1	Pegasus	Mong Kok, Kowloon
20:00 (UTC+8)	Ju Yingzhi 49'; Wellingsson 76'	Report	Chan Pak Hang 68'	Stadium: Mong Kok Stadium; Attendance: 1,483; Referee: Tam Ping Wun

16 January 2020 10	Pegasus	0–3	Kitchee	So Kon Po, Hong Kong Island
20:00 (UTC+8)		Report	Wellingsson 4', 63'; Glassock 11' (o.g.)	Stadium: Hong Kong Stadium; Attendance: 747; Referee: Lau Fong Hei

6 March 2020 11	Kitchee	Cancelled	Tai Po	Mong Kok, Kowloon
20:00 (UTC+8)		Report		Stadium: Mong Kok Stadium

11 October 2020 12	Happy Valley	0–4	Kitchee	Mong Kok, Kowloon
15:00 (UTC+8)		Report	Gavilán 36'; Wellingsson 59', 63', 65'	Stadium: Mong Kok Stadium; Attendance: 0 Referee: Woo Chun Sing

19 September 2020 13	Eastern	2–1	Kitchee	Tseung Kwan O, New Territories
15:00 (UTC+8)	Diego 52'; Chung Wai Keung 68'	Report	Komazec 63' (pen.)	Stadium: Tseung Kwan O Sports Ground; Attendance: 0 Referee: Tam Ping Wun

24 September 2020 14	Kitchee	2–1	Lee Man	Siu Sai Wan, Hong Kong Island
15:00 (UTC+8)	Komazec 31'; Tong Kin Man 83'	Report	N'dri 42' (pen.)	Stadium: Siu Sai Wan Sports Ground; Attendance: 0 Referee: Liu Kwok Man

1 October 2020 15	R&F	2–3	Kitchee	Tseung Kwan O, New Territories
15:00 (UTC+8)	Giovane 67', 76'	Report	Law Tsz Chun 17'; Gavilán 27'; Wellingsson 80'	Stadium: Tseung Kwan O Sports Ground; Attendance: 0 Referee: Tam Ping Wun

3 May 2020 16	Kitchee	Cancelled	Rangers	Mong Kok, Kowloon
17:30 (UTC+8)		Report		Stadium: Mong Kok Stadium

4 October 2020 17	Kitchee	1–1	Southern	So Kon Po, Hong Kong Island
15:00 (UTC+8)	Gavilán 73'	Report	Kawase 84'	Stadium: Hong Kong Stadium; Attendance: 0 Referee: Ho Wai Sing

23 May 2020 18	Yuen Long	Cancelled	Kitchee	Yuen Long, New Territories
14:30 (UTC+8)		Report		Stadium: Yuen Long Stadium

=== Hong Kong Senior Challenge Shield ===
10 November 2019 QF	Kitchee	1–5	Lee Man	Yuen Long, New Territories
14:30 (UTC+8)	Bleda 52'	Report	Yu Pui Hong 12'; Yu Wai Lim 31'; Gil 33', 41'; N'dri 90+2'	Stadium: Yuen Long Stadium; Attendance: 605; Referee: Ng Chiu Kok

=== Hong Kong Sapling Cup ===
==== Group stage ====
Pos	Team	Pld	W	D	L	GF	GA	GD	Pts	Qualification
1	Kitchee (A)	8	6	1	1	20	6	+14	19	Advance to Final
2	Eastern	8	5	1	2	14	5	+9	16	
3	Pegasus	8	4	0	4	19	20	−1	12	
4	Lee Man	8	2	1	5	17	22	−5	7	
5	Rangers	8	1	1	6	10	27	−17	4	

Source: Hong Kong Football Association
Rules for classification: 1) Points; 2) Head-to-head points; 3) Head-to-head goal difference; 4) Goal difference; 5) Goals scored.
(A) Advance to a further round

23 October 2019 1	Kitchee	2–2	Lee Man	Mong Kok, Kowloon
19:00	Wellingsson 30'; Buddle 47'	Report	N'dri 11'; Ngan Lok Fung 80'	Stadium: Mong Kok Stadium; Attendance: 627; Referee: Tang Hing Fu

27 October 2019 2	Eastern	2–1	Kitchee	Tsing Yi, New Territories
17:30	Harima 32'; Eduardo 86'	Report	Barak 79'	Stadium: Tsing Yi Sports Ground, Tsing Yi; Attendance: 721; Referee: Ho Wai Sing

5 December 2019 3	Pegasus	1–4	Kitchee	Yuen Long, New Territories
19:00	Lee Oi Hin 4'	Report	Bleda 1', 60'; Fernando 84', 90+3'	Stadium: Yuen Long Stadium; Attendance: 306; Referee: Yu Kin Fung

4 January 2020 4	Rangers	0–1	Kitchee	Tai Po, New Territories
14:30		Report	Wellingsson 11'	Stadium: Tai Po Sports Ground; Attendance: 407; Referee: Woo Chun Sing

10 January 2020 5	Lee Man	1–4	Kitchee	Mong Kok, Kowloon
20:00	Shapoval 72' (pen.)	Report	Fernando 4', 44'; Wellingsson 39'; Chan Shinichi 64'	Stadium: Mong Kok Stadium; Attendance: 783; Referee: Luk Kin Sun

11 February 2020 6	Kitchee	3–0	Rangers	Tseung Kwan O, New Territories
13:00	Cleiton 53'; Buddle 56'; Bleda 82'	Report		Stadium: Jockey Club HKFA Football Training Centre No. 3 Attendance: 0 Referee: Wong Kei Hoi

14 February 2020 7	Kitchee	1–0	Eastern	Tseung Kwan O, New Territories
16:00	Fernando 89'	Report		Stadium: Jockey Club HKFA Football Training Centre No. 2 Attendance: 0 Referee: Yu Kin Fung

23 February 2020 8	Kitchee	4–0	Pegasus	Tseung Kwan O, New Territories
13:00	Wellingsson 61', 70'; Bleda 72'; Li Ngai Hoi 85'	Report		Stadium: Jockey Club HKFA Football Training Centre No. 3 Attendance: 0 Referee: Ng Chiu Kok

==== Final ====
27 September 2020 F	Kitchee	3–1	Southern	Tseung Kwan O, New Territories
15:00	Matt Orr 35' (pen.); Wellingsson 65'; Barak 75'	Report	Beto 44'	Stadium: Tseung Kwan O Sports Ground; Attendance: 0 Referee: Tam Ping Wun

=== Hong Kong FA Cup ===
15 March 2020 QF	Kitchee	0–2	Eastern	Tseung Kwan O, New Territories
14:30 UTC+8		Report	Sandro 56'; Everton 83'	Stadium: Tseung Kwan O Sports Ground; Attendance: 0 Referee: Ng Chiu Kok
