= 2019–20 Hong Kong Rangers FC season =

Rangers 2019–20 season
- President: Peter Mok
- Director of Football: Philip Lee
- Co-Head coaches: Chiu Chung Man; Wong Chin Hung
- Stadium: Tuen Mun Tang Shiu Kin Sports Ground
- Premier League: Withdrew
- Senior Shield: Quarter-finals
- FA Cup: First Round
- Sapling Cup: Group Stage
- Top goalscorer: League: Leandro Bazán (6 goals); All: Leandro Bazán (12 goals)
- Highest home attendance: 452 (vs Kitchee, 3 November 2019)
- Lowest home attendance: 240 (vs R&F, 22 December 2019)
- Average home league attendance: 375
Home colours	Away colours

The 2019–20 season is Rangers's 40th season in the top-tier division in Hong Kong football. Rangers will compete in the Premier League, Senior Challenge Shield, FA Cup and Sapling Cup this season. However, due to the 2020 coronavirus pandemic in Hong Kong, Rangers announced their withdrawal from the remaining matches this season in April 2020.

== Squad ==
=== First Team ===
As of 7 March 2020

Note: Flags indicate national team as defined under FIFA eligibility rules; some limited exceptions apply. Players may hold more than one non-FIFA nationality.

No.	Pos.	Nation	Player
1	GK	(Hong Kong) HKG	Lo Siu Kei
3	MF	(Japan) JPN	Shu Kitamura ^{LP}
4	DF	(Hong Kong) HKG	Man Wai Fung
5	DF	(Paraguay) PAR	Pablo Leguizamón ^{FP}
6	MF	(Hong Kong) HKG	Wong Chin Hung
7	FW	(Argentina) ARG	Diego Cañete ^{FP}
8	MF	(Hong Kong) HKG	Wong Pun Wai
9	FW	(Hong Kong) HKG	Lau Chi Lok (on loan from Pegasus)
10	MF	(Argentina) ARG	Leandro Bazán ^{FP}
11	MF	(Hong Kong) HKG	Chan Wai Lok
12	FW	(Hong Kong) HKG	Lam Hok Hei (on loan from Eastern)
13	DF	(Hong Kong) HKG	Luk Kin Ming
14	FW	(Hong Kong) HKG	Lee Si Wang
16	FW	(Hong Kong) HKG	Christian Annan

No.	Pos.	Nation	Player
17	MF	(Hong Kong) HKG	Aender Naves
18	MF	(Hong Kong) HKG	Peng Lin Lin
19	DF	(Hong Kong) HKG	Poon Pak On
20	FW	(Brazil) BRA	Stefan Pereira ^{FP}
22	DF	(Brazil) BRA	Tomas (captain) ^{FP}
23	DF	(Hong Kong) HKG	Tse Wai Chun (on loan from R&F)
25	MF	(Hong Kong) HKG	Cheung Ka Chun
26	DF	(Hong Kong) HKG	Chung Sing Lam
27	MF	(Hong Kong) HKG	Tang Lok Man
28	GK	(Hong Kong) HKG	Chow Kwan Chun
30	GK	(Hong Kong) HKG	So Chi Wai (on loan from Yuen Long)
32	DF	(Hong Kong) HKG	Tita
55	DF	(Hong Kong) HKG	Jean-Jacques Kilama
89	MF	(Hong Kong) HKG	Au Yeung Yiu Chung

Remarks:
^{LP} These players are registered as local players in Hong Kong domestic football competitions.
^{FP} These players are registered as foreign players.

== Transfers ==
=== Transfers in ===
Date from	Position	Nationality	Name	From	Fee	Ref.
29 July 2019	DF	(Paraguay)	Pablo Leguizamón	Free agent	Free	
29 July 2019	FW	(Argentina)	Leandro Bazán	(Argentina) Douglas Haig	Free	
29 July 2019	FW	(Argentina)	Diego Cañete	Free agent	Free	
31 July 2019	MF	(Hong Kong)	Au Yeung Yiu Chung	Tai Po	Free	
1 August 2020	MF	(Hong Kong)	Peng Lin Lin	Dreams FC	Free	
12 August 2019	GK	(Hong Kong)	Lo Siu Kei	Resources Capital	Free	
12 August 2019	DF	(Hong Kong)	Man Wai Fung	Dreams FC	Free	
12 August 2019	DF	(Hong Kong)	Poon Pak On	Dreams FC	Free	
12 August 2019	DF	(Brazil)	Tomas	Yuen Long	Free	
12 August 2019	MF	(Hong Kong)	Wong Pun Wai	Yuen Long	Free	
12 August 2019	MF	(Hong Kong)	Chan Wai Lok	Hoi King	Free	
12 August 2020	FW	(Hong Kong)	Lee Si Wang	Yuen Long	Free	
14 August 2020	MF	(Brazil)	Aender Naves	Eastern District	Free	
28 August 2019	FW	(Hong Kong)	Christian Annan	Kitchee	Free	
August 2019	FW	(Brazil)	Stefan Pereira	Lee Man	Free	
16 September 2019	DF	(Hong Kong)	Jean-Jacques Kilama	Tai Po	Free	
12 January 2020	DF	(Hong Kong)	Celistanus Tita Chou	King Fung	Free	
12 January 2020	MF	(Japan) (Hong Kong)	Shu Kitamura	Free agent	Free	
January 2020	GK	(Hong Kong)	Chow Kwan Chun	Leaper's St. Joseph	Free	

=== Transfers out ===
Date from	Position	Nationality	Name	To	Fee	Ref.
1 July 2019	GK	(Hong Kong)	Wong Tsz Him	Citizen	Released	
1 July 2019	DF	(Hong Kong)	Chiu Chun Kit	Citizen	Released	
1 July 2019	DF	(Brazil)	Fabrício Lopes	Shatin	Released	
1 July 2019	DF	(Brazil)	Fernando Lopes	Eastern District	Released	
1 July 2019	MF	(Hong Kong)	Lai Lok Yin	Icanfield	Released	
1 July 2019	MF	(Hong Kong)	Zhang Jun	Icanfield	Released	
1 July 2019	MF	(Serbia)	Uros Vidovic	(Serbia) Radnički Kragujevac	Released	
1 July 2019	FW	(Republic of the Congo)	Tiekoro Sissoko	King Fung	Released	
October 2019	GK	(Hong Kong)	Chan Pak Ho	Icanfield	Released	
1 June 2020	FW	(Brazil)	Stefan Pereira	Southern	Released	
1 June 2020	DF	(Paraguay)	Pablo Leguizamón		Released	
1 June 2020	FW	(Argentina)	Leandro Bazán		Released	
1 June 2020	FW	(Argentina)	Diego Cañete		Released	
1 July 2020	DF	(Brazil)	Tomas	Kitchee	Released	
1 July 2020	DF	(Hong Kong)	Luk Kin Ming	Kitchee	Released	
1 July 2020	MF	(Hong Kong)	Peng Lin Lin	Kitchee	Released	

=== Loans in ===
Start Date	End Date	Position	Nationality	Name	From Club	Fee	Ref.
1 August 2019	End of season	DF	(Hong Kong)	Tse Wai Chun	R&F	Undisclosed	
1 August 2019	End of season	FW	(Hong Kong)	Lau Chi Lok	Pegasus	Undisclosed	
12 August 2019	February 2020	GK	(China)	Ji Xiangzheng	R&F	Undisclosed	
6 September 2019	End of season	GK	(Hong Kong)	So Chi Wai	Yuen Long	Undisclosed	
27 September 2019	End of season	FW	(Hong Kong)	Lam Hok Hei	Eastern	Undisclosed	

=== Loans out ===
Start Date	End Date	Position	Nationality	Name	To Club	Fee	Ref.
August 2019	24 January 2020	FW	(Brazil)	Stefan Pereira	Citizen	Undisclosed	

== Team staff ==
Position	Staff
Director of football	(Hong Kong) Philip Lee
Co-head coaches	(Hong Kong) Chiu Chung Man (Hong Kong) Wong Chin Hung
Assistant coach	(Hong Kong) Lai Ka Fai
Assistant coach	(Hong Kong) Su Yang
Goalkeeping coach	(Hong Kong) Cheung Wai Hong
Technical director	(Hong Kong) Fung Wing Shing
Team manager	(Hong Kong) But Yiu Wai

== Competitions ==
=== Hong Kong Premier League ===
==== Table ====
Pos	Team	Pld	W	D	L	GF	GA	GD	Pts	Qualification or relegation
6	Happy Valley	10	0	1	9	6	31	−25	1	
7	Pegasus (D)	0	0	0	0	0	0	0	0	Withdrew, record expunged (Note: Pegasus and Rangers withdrew from the league due to the 2020 coronavirus pandemic in Hong Kong, and their records were expunged.)
8	Rangers (D)	0	0	0	0	0	0	0	0	Withdrew, record expunged
9	Tai Po (D, R)	0	0	0	0	0	0	0	0	Withdrew, record expunged Relegation to Hong Kong First Division League (Note: Tai Po and Yuen Long withdrew from the league due to the 2020 coronavirus pandemic in Hong Kong, and their records were expunged. On 12 June 2020, it was announced that they would self-relegate due to lack of funds.)
10	Yuen Long (D, R)	0	0	0	0	0	0	0	0	Withdrew, record expunged Relegation to Hong Kong First Division League

Source: Hong Kong Football Association
Rules for classification: 1) Points; 2) Head-to-head points; 3) Head-to-head goal difference; 4) Head-to-head goals scored; 5) Goal difference; 6) Goals scored; 7) Fair-play points; 8) Drawing lots (Play-off if the winner has to be decided).
(D) Disqualified; (R) Relegated
Notes:

Win Draw Loss

=== Hong Kong Sapling Cup ===
==== Group stage ====
Pos	Team	Pld	W	D	L	GF	GA	GD	Pts	Qualification
1	Kitchee (A)	8	6	1	1	20	6	+14	19	Advance to Final
2	Eastern	8	5	1	2	14	5	+9	16	
3	Pegasus	8	4	0	4	19	20	−1	12	
4	Lee Man	8	2	1	5	17	22	−5	7	
5	Rangers	8	1	1	6	10	27	−17	4	

Source: Hong Kong Football Association
Rules for classification: 1) Points; 2) Head-to-head points; 3) Head-to-head goal difference; 4) Goal difference; 5) Goals scored.
(A) Advance to a further round
