= Mark Swainston =

Filipino footballer

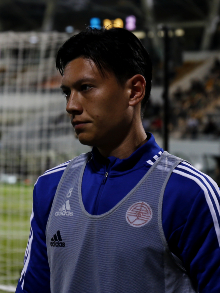
- Swainston playing for Eastern

Personal information
- Full name: Mark Francis Mercenes Swainston
- Date of birth: 13 November 1999 (age 26)
- Place of birth: Tacloban City, Philippines
- Height: 1.79 m (5 ft 10 in)
- Position: Midfielder

Team information
- Current team: Crowborough Athletic

Youth career
- 2013–2014: KCC
- 2014–2016: Kitchee

Senior career*
Years	Team	Apps	(Gls)
2016–2021	Kitchee	10	(0)
2018–2019	→ Hoi King (loan)	13	(0)
2022–2023	Eastern	7	(1)
2023–2025	Kaya F.C.–Iloilo	11	(1)
2025	Lewes	3	(0)
2025	Hastings United	8	(0)
2025–	Crowborough Athletic	12	(1)

International career^{‡}
2017	Philippines U18	4	(0)
2024	Philippines	2	(0)
Medal record
Kitchee SC
Winner	Hong Kong Premier League	2016–17
Winner	Hong Kong Community Cup	2017
- * Club domestic league appearances and goals as of 15 April 2026 ‡ National team caps and goals as of 24 December 2025

Mark Francis Mercenes Swainston (Chinese: 史雲斯頓; born 13 November 1999) is a Filipino professional footballer who plays as a midfielder for Isthmian League South East Division club Crowborough Athletic.

== Early life ==
Mark moved to Hong Kong before his first birthday. He studied in Island School along with professional footballers Rory Lonergan and Barak Braunshtain.

== Club career ==
=== Kitchee ===
Swainston joined Kitchee in 2014 and was promoted to their senior squad in July 2016. However, in December 2016 FIFA enforced a ban on numerous foreign players in Hong Kong, including Swainston, as he did not have a Hong Kong passport, thus making him a foreign player. This ruling was eventually overturned, and Swainston made his professional debut on 7 April 2017, coming on as a 69th-minute substitute for Hélio in a 10–0 victory against HKFC.

==== Loan to Hoi King ====
On 24 July 2018, following a preseason friendly, Hoi King confirmed that they had acquired Swainston on loan.

On 25 August 2021, Swainston left Kitchee.

=== Eastern ===
On 24 November 2022, Swainston joined Eastern. Mark made his debut in the 3–0 victory over HKFC in the Hong Kong FA Cup quarter-finals, coming on as a substitute for Leon Jones.

=== Move to England ===
Ahead of the 2025–26 season, Swainston moved to England, joining Isthmian League Premier Division club Lewes before signing for Hastings United in September 2025. In December 2025, he joined fellow Isthmian League South East Division side Crowborough Athletic.

== International career ==
Swainston made his debut for the senior Philippines national team on 26 March 2024 in a World Cup qualifier against Iraq.

== Career statistics ==
=== Club ===
As of 29 March 2019.

Club	Season	League			National Cup		Other Cups		Continental		Other		Total	
Club	Season	Division	Apps	Goals	Apps	Goals	Apps	Goals	Apps	Goals	Apps	Goals	Apps	Goals
Kitchee	2016–17	Hong Kong Premier League	1	0	0	0	0	0	0	0	0	0	1	0
Kitchee	2017–18	Hong Kong Premier League	0	0	0	0	2 (Note: Appearances in the Sapling Cup)	0	0	0	1 (Note: Appearances in the Hong Kong Community Cup)	0	3	0
Kitchee	2018–19	Hong Kong Premier League	0	0	0	0	0	0	0	0	0	0	0	0
Kitchee	2019–20	Hong Kong Premier League	5	0	0	0	5	0	0	0	0	0	10	0
Kitchee	Total		6	0	0	0	7	0	0	0	1	0	14	0
Hoi King (loan)	2018–19	Hong Kong Premier League	13	0	1 (Note: Appearances in the Hong Kong FA Cup)	0	2	0	0	0	1 (Note: Appearances in the Hong Kong Senior Shield)	0	17	0
Career total			19	0	1	0	7	0	0	0	1	0	31	0

== Honours ==
=== Club ===
Kitchee

- Hong Kong Premier League: 2019–20
- Hong Kong Sapling Cup: 2019–20

==== Kaya–Iloilo ====
- Philippines Football League: 2024
