= 2020–21 Hong Kong FA Cup =

Tournament details
- Country: Hong Kong
- Dates: 5 December 2020 – 27 June 2021
- Teams: 8

The 2020–21 Hong Kong FA Cup was the scheduled 47th edition of the Hong Kong FA Cup. Eight teams were divided into two groups, with the top two finishers in each group advancing to the semi-finals. The competition was only open to clubs who participate in the 2020–21 Hong Kong Premier League.

However, due to the COVID-19 pandemic in Hong Kong, the HKFA announced on 12 February 2021 that the current edition of the HKFA Cup would be cancelled.

== Calendar ==
Phase	Round	Draw Date	Date	Matches	Clubs
Group stage	Matchday 1	27 November 2020	5–6 December 2020	12	8 → 4
Group stage	Matchday 2	27 November 2020	20–21 February 2021	12	8 → 4
Group stage	Matchday 3	27 November 2020	6–7 March 2021	12	8 → 4
Knockout phase	Semi-finals	27 November 2020	1–2 May 2021 at Mong Kok Stadium	2	4 → 2
Knockout phase	Final	27 November 2020	27 June 2021 at Hong Kong Stadium	1	2 → 1

== Bracket ==
Semi-finals
1
4
3
2

Final

Bold = winner
* = after extra time, ( ) = penalty shootout score

== Fixtures and results ==
=== Group stage ===
==== Group A ====
Pos	Team	Pld	W	D	L	GF	GA	GD	Pts	Qualification
1	Lee Man	0	0	0	0	0	0	0	**0**	Advance to Semi-finals
2	Rangers	0	0	0	0	0	0	0	**0**	Advance to Semi-finals
3	Pegasus	0	0	0	0	0	0	0	**0**	
4	Resources Capital	0	0	0	0	0	0	0	**0**	

Source: Hong Kong Football Association
Rules for classification: 1) Points; 2) Head-to-head points; 3) Head-to-head goal difference; 4) Goal difference; 5) Goals scored.

5 December 2020 MD1	**Lee Man**	**v**	**Pegasus**	Tai Po Sports Ground
15:00 UTC+8		Report

6 December 2020 MD1	**Resources Capital**	**v**	**Rangers**	Sham Shui Po Sports Ground
15:00 UTC+8		Report

20 February 2021 MD2	**Pegasus**	**v**	**Resources Capital**	Hammer Hill Road Sports Ground
15:00 UTC+8		Report

20 February 2021 MD2	**Rangers**	**v**	**Lee Man**	Mong Kok Stadium
17:30 UTC+8		Report

6 March 2021 MD3	**Resources Capital**	**v**	**Lee Man**	Yuen Long Stadium
15:00 UTC+8		Report

6 March 2021 MD3	**Rangers**	**v**	**Pegasus**	Tsing Yi Sports Ground
17:30 UTC+8		Report

==== Group B ====
Pos	Team	Pld	W	D	L	GF	GA	GD	Pts	Qualification
1	Eastern	0	0	0	0	0	0	0	**0**	Advance to Semi-finals
2	Happy Valley	0	0	0	0	0	0	0	**0**	Advance to Semi-finals
3	Kitchee	0	0	0	0	0	0	0	**0**	
4	Southern	0	0	0	0	0	0	0	**0**	

Source: Hong Kong Football Association
Rules for classification: 1) Points; 2) Head-to-head points; 3) Head-to-head goal difference; 4) Goal difference; 5) Goals scored.

5 December 2020 MD1	**Eastern**	**v**	**Kitchee**	Hong Kong Stadium
17:30 UTC+8		Report

6 December 2020 MD1	**Happy Valley**	**v**	**Southern**	Tai Po Sports Ground
15:00 UTC+8		Report

21 February 2021 MD2	**Kitchee**	**v**	**Southern**	Tsing Yi Sports Ground
15:00 UTC+8		Report

21 February 2021 MD2	**Eastern**	**v**	**Happy Valley**	Yuen Long Stadium
17:30 UTC+8		Report

7 March 2021 MD3	**Happy Valley**	**v**	**Kitchee**	Hammer Hill Road Sports Ground
15:00 UTC+8		Report

7 March 2021 MD3	**Southern**	**v**	**Eastern**	Tseung Kwan O Sports Ground
17:30 UTC+8		Report

=== Semi-finals ===
1 May 2021 SF1	**Winner Group A**	**v**	**Runner-up Group B**	Mong Kok Stadium
16:00 UTC+8		Report

2 May 2021 SF2	**Winner Group B**	**v**	**Runner-up Group A**	Mong Kok Stadium
16:00 UTC+8		Report

=== Final ===
27 June 2021 F	**Winner SF1**	**v**	**Winner SF2**	Hong Kong Stadium
16:00 UTC+8		Report
