= Shu Kitamura =

Hong Kong footballer

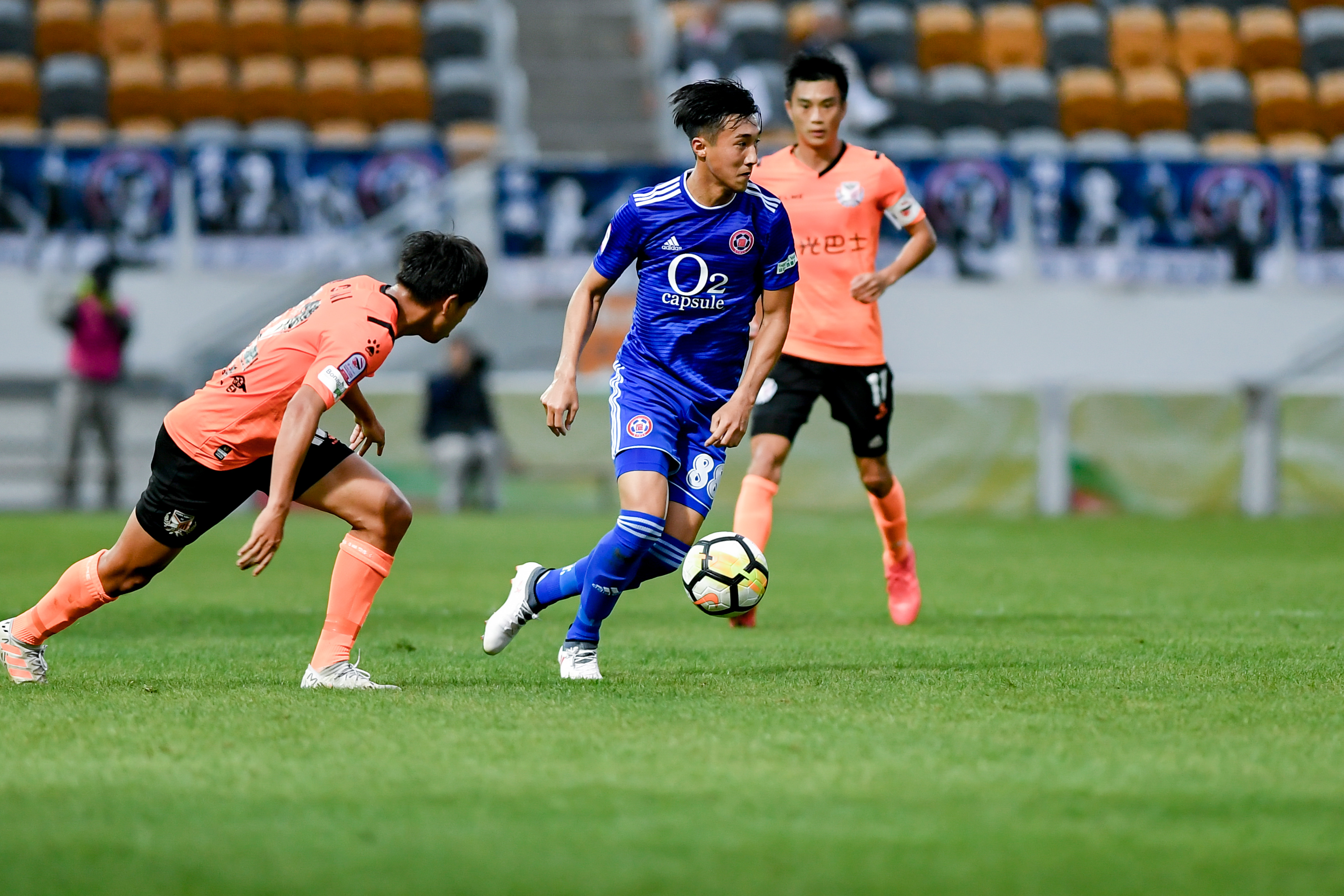
- Kitamura playing for Eastern

Personal information
- Full name: Shu Kitamura
- Date of birth: 9 May 1996 (age 30)
- Place of birth: Kowloon, Hong Kong
- Height: 1.79 m (5 ft 10 in)
- Positions: Midfielder; right back

Youth career
- 2007–2012: Kitchee
- 2012–2014: IMG Academy
- 2017: Mogi Mirim

College career
| Years | Team | Apps | (Gls) |
| 2014 | Knox | 18 | (2) |
| 2015–2016 | UMass Lowell | 3 | (0) |

Senior career*
| Years | Team | Apps | (Gls) |
| 2017–2018 | Eastern | 0 | (0) |
| 2018–2019 | Dreams | 11 | (0) |
| 2020 | Rangers (HKG) | 1 | (0) |
| 2020–2021 | Kui Tan | 1 | (0) |
| 2021–2023 | Kowloon Cricket Club | 13 | (4) |
| 2024–2025 | Eastern District | 16 | (0) |
- * Club domestic league appearances and goals as of 31 July 2025

Shu Kitamura (北村祝, Kitamura Shu; born 9 May 1996) is a Hong Kong former professional footballer who played as a midfielder or a right back.

== Playing career ==
=== Dreams FC ===
Only making 2 appearances in his debut season, Kitamura decided to move to Dreams FC to increase his playing time and opportunities, joining his former coach from his time at Kitchee, Leung Chi Wing. He left the club a year later.

=== Rangers ===
On 10 January 2020, Kitamura joined another HKPL club Rangers.

== Career statistics ==
=== Club ===
As of 10 November 2020.

| Club | Season | League | | | National Cup | | League Cup | | Other | | Total | |
| Club | Season | Division | Apps | Goals | Apps | Goals | Apps | Goals | Apps | Goals | Apps | Goals |
|---|---|---|---|---|---|---|---|---|---|---|---|---|
| Eastern | 2017–18 | Hong Kong Premier League | 0 | 0 | 0 | 0 | 2 (Note: Appearances in the Sapling Cup) | 0 | 0 | 0 | 2 | 0 |
| Dreams FC | 2018–19 | Hong Kong Premier League | 11 | 0 | 0 | 0 | 0 | 0 | 1 (Note: Appearances in the Hong Kong Senior Shield) | 0 | 12 | 0 |
| Rangers | 2019–20 | Hong Kong Premier League | 1 | 0 | 0 | 0 | 1 | 0 | 0 | 0 | 2 | 0 |
| Career total | | | 12 | 0 | 0 | 0 | 2 | 0 | 2 | 0 | 16 | 0 |
