= Rory Lonergan =

English footballer

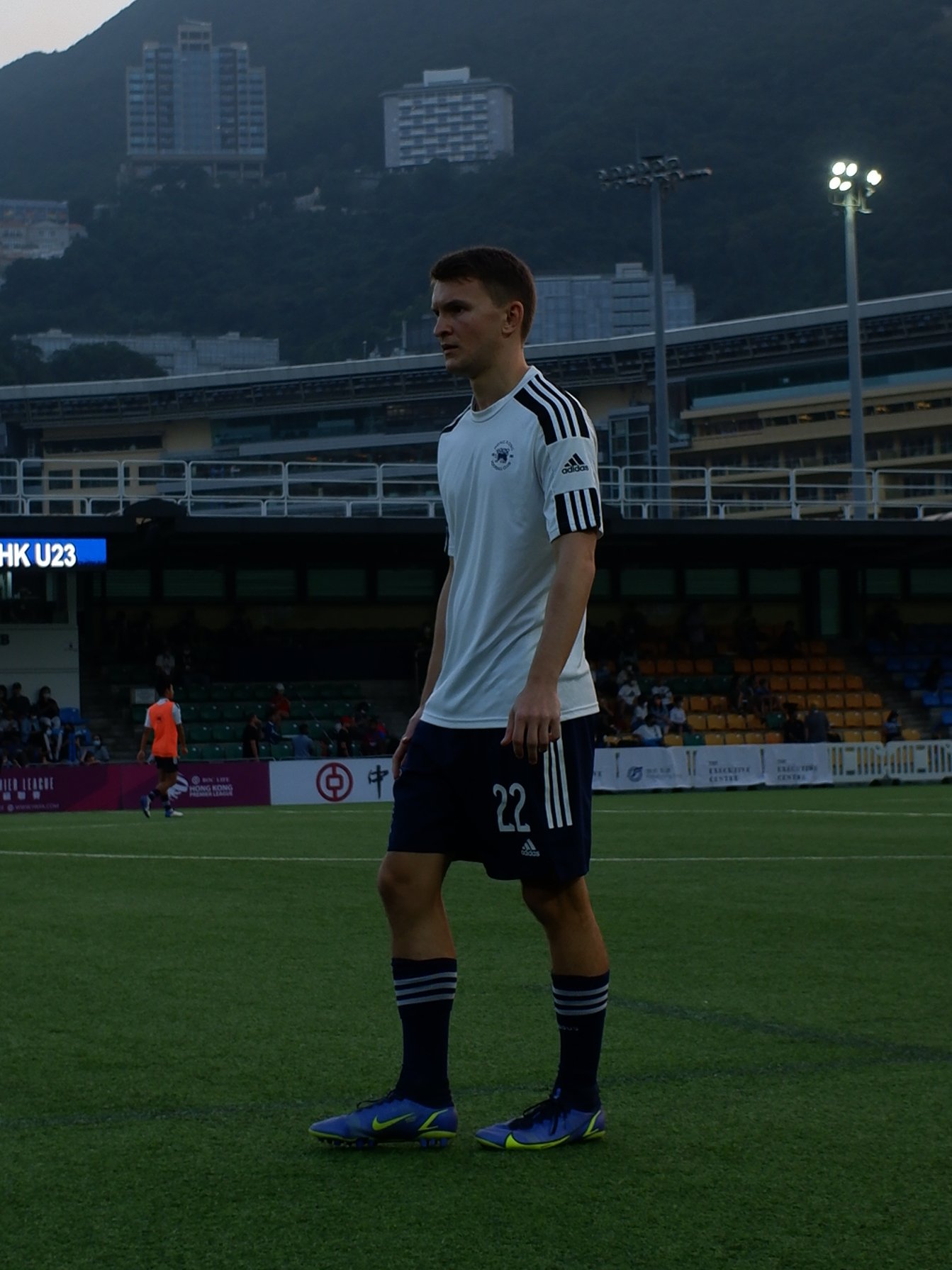

Personal information
- Full name: Rory James Lonergan
- Date of birth: 1 June 1999 (age 27)
- Place of birth: England
- Position: Left back

Youth career
- –2015: HKFC

Senior career*
Years	Team	Apps	(Gls)
2017–2023	HKFC	52	(0)
- * Club domestic league appearances and goals as of 2 October 2021

Rory James Lonergan (born 1 June 1999) is an English former professional footballer who played as a left back.

== Club career ==
=== HKFC ===
Rory was promoted to the senior squad ahead of the 2017–18 season.

== Personal life ==
Lonergan graduated with a degree in Economics and Politics from Durham University (Collingwood College).

== Career statistics ==
=== Club ===
Appearances and goals by club, season and competition
Club	Season	League			Cup		League Cup		Total	
Club	Season	Division	Apps	Goals	Apps	Goals	Apps	Goals	Apps	Goals
HKFC	2017–18	First Division	21	0	2 (Note: Appearances in the Hong Kong FA Cup Junior Division)	0	0	0	23	0
HKFC	2018–19	First Division	1	0	1	0	0	0	2	0
HKFC	2019–20	First Division	2	0	0	0	0	0	2	0
HKFC	2020–21	First Division	10	0	0	0	0	0	10	0
HKFC	2021–22	Premier League	0	0	0	0	1 (Note: Appearances in the Sapling Cup)	0	1	0
HKFC	Total		34	0	3	0	1	0	38	0
