= Lee Si Wang =

Hong Kong footballer

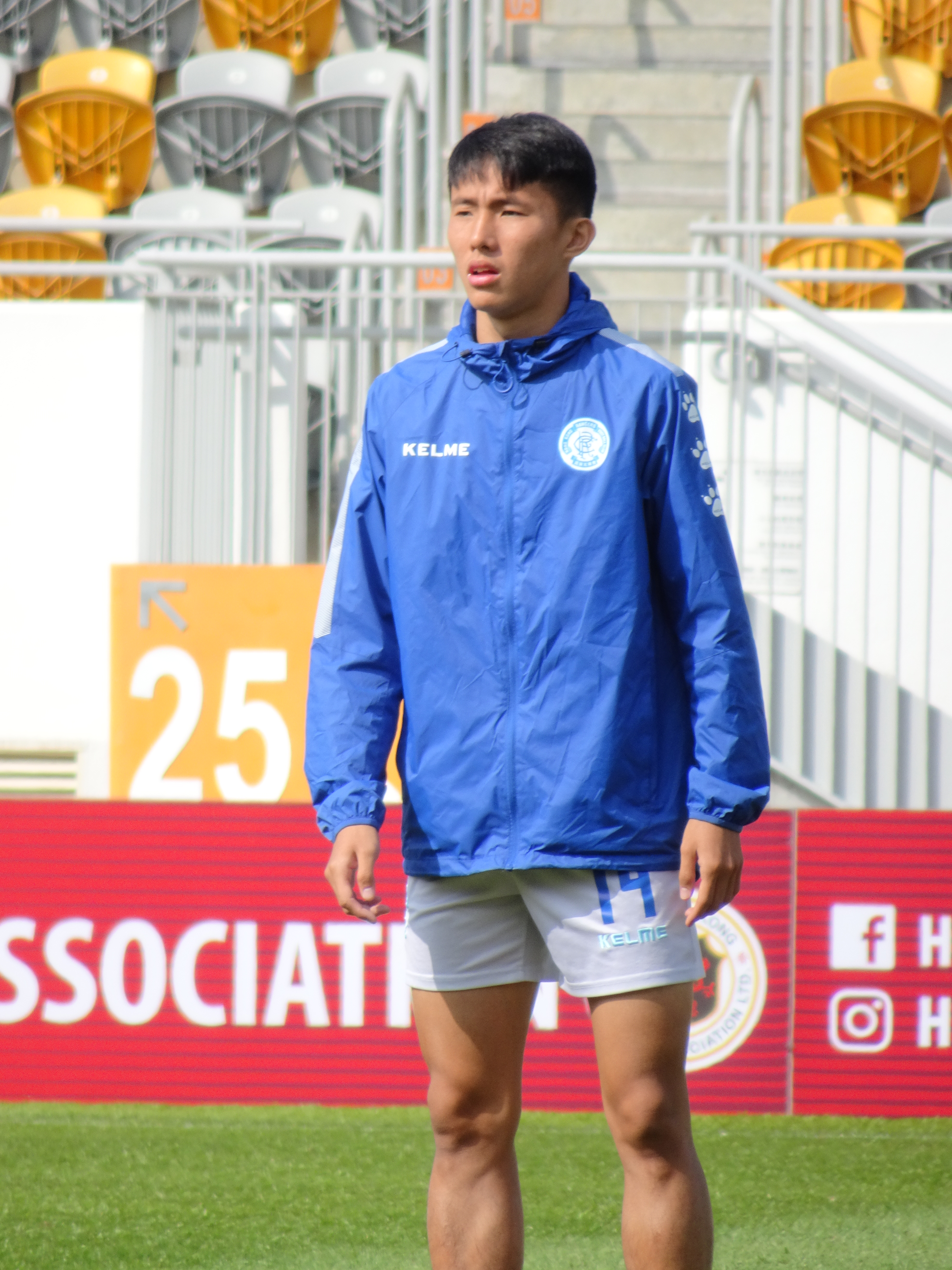

Personal information
- Full name: Lee Si Wang
- Date of birth: 17 July 1999 (age 27)
- Place of birth: Hong Kong
- Height: 1.80 m (5 ft 11 in)
- Position: Forward

Senior career*
Years	Team	Apps	(Gls)
2017–2019	Yuen Long	1	(0)
2019–2021	Hong Kong Rangers	2	(0)
2022–2024	Sai Kung	25	(5)
2024–	Supreme	38	(4)
- * Club domestic league appearances and goals as of 16 May 2026

Lee Si Wang (Chinese: 李鍶泓; born 17 July 1999) is a former Hong Kong professional footballer.

== Career statistics ==
=== Club ===
As of 29 March 2019.

Club	Season	League			National Cup		League Cup		Continental		Other		Total	
Club	Season	Division	Apps	Goals	Apps	Goals	Apps	Goals	Apps	Goals	Apps	Goals	Apps	Goals
Yuen Long	2017–18	Hong Kong Premier League	1	0	0	0	1 (Note: Appearances in the Sapling Cup)	0	0	0	0	0	2	0
Yuen Long	2018–19	Hong Kong Premier League	0	0	0	0	0	0	0	0	0	0	0	0
Career total			1	0	0	0	1	0	0	0	0	0	2	0
