= Chu Chi Kwong =

Hong Kong footballer (born 1960)

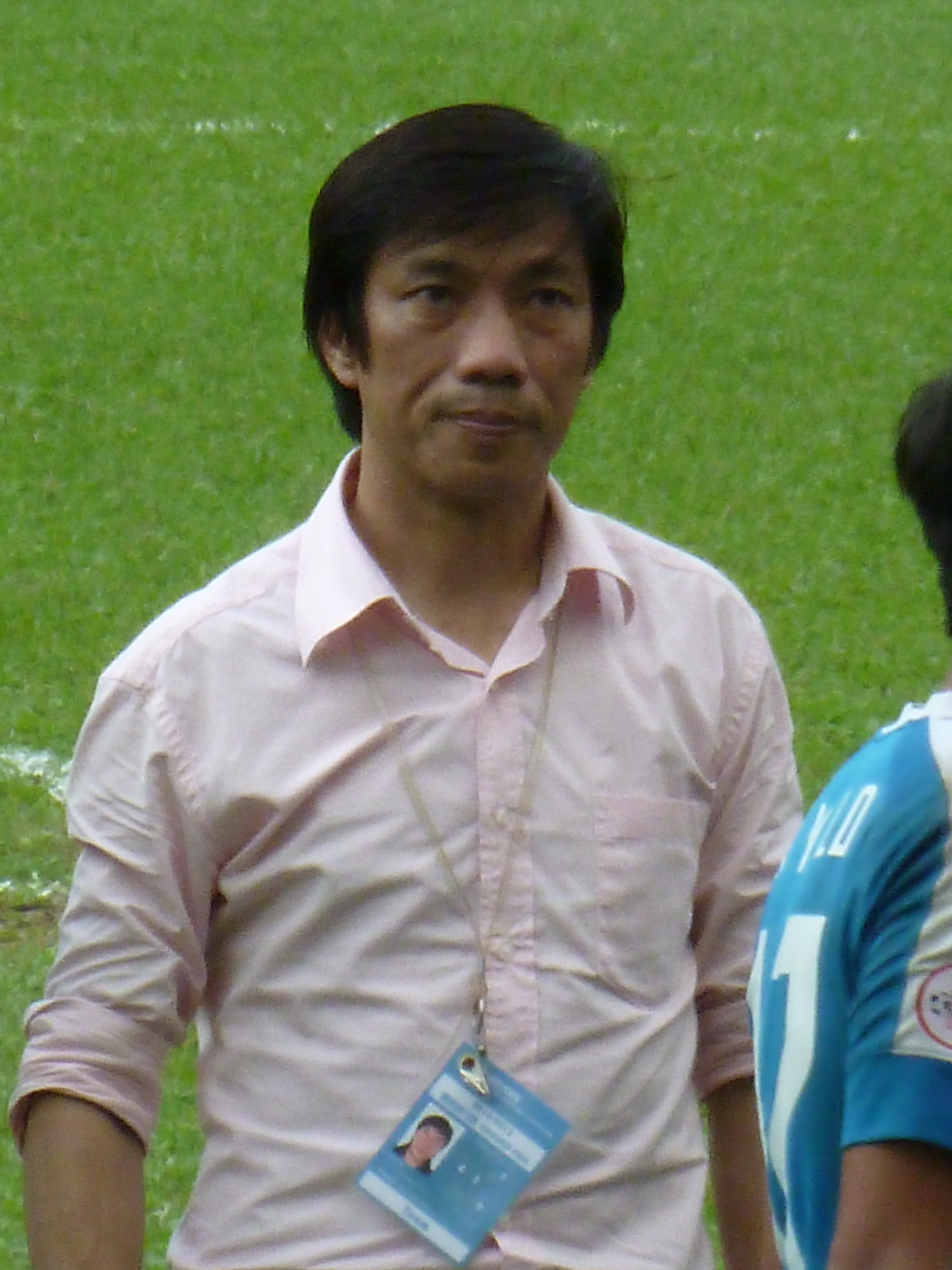
- Chu in 2013

Personal information
- Full name: Alex Chu Chi Kwong
- Date of birth: 29 August 1960 (age 66)
- Place of birth: Hong Kong
- Position: Defender

Team information
- Current team: Eastern District (Sporting Director)

Senior career*
Years	Team	Apps	(Gls)
1980–1988	Sea Bee		
1988–1999	Sing Tao		

Managerial career
- 2001–2005: Fukien
- 2016–2019: Kitchee
- 2019–2021: Hong Kong (Assistant Coach)
- 2020–2023: Kitchee
- 2024–2025: Kitchee Women
- 2025–: Eastern District (Sporting Director)
- * Club domestic league appearances and goals

Alex Chu Chi Kwong (Chinese: 朱志光; Jyutping: zyu^{1} zi^{3} gwong^{1}; born 29 August 1960) is a Hong Kong football manager and former professional footballer. He is currently the Sporting Director at Hong Kong Premier League club Eastern District.

Chu holds an AFC “Pro” License coaching certification.

== Playing career ==
Born in Hong Kong, Chu played for Hong Kong First Division clubs Sea Bee and Sing Tao during his playing career. Chu spent his best playing days as a member of Sing Tao, lifting the Viceroy Cup twice, in the 1994–95 and 1996–97 seasons. One of his most notable games for Sing Tao was when Chu had to cameo as the goalkeeper in a league tie against Golden.

== Coaching career ==
Following retirement from playing, Chu took over the managerial position at Fukien in 2001. Despite working with a limited budget, Fukien were able to stave off relegation from First Division during Chu's first three years at the club while occasionally scoring upset victories over table toppers Happy Valley and Sun Hei. During his tenure, he discovered and coached several players who went on to represent Hong Kong at a national level, such as Tong Kin Man, Zhang Chunhui and Wong Chin Hung.

After a disappointing 8th-place finish during the 2004–05 season, Fukien chose to voluntarily relegate themselves to the Second Division and Chu left the club.

In 2006, Chu joined Kitchee as a coach. Players such as Ngan Lok Fung, Li Ngai Hoi, Tsang Kin Fong trained under his tutelage at Kitchee's academy and later became professional footballers. After Dejan Antonić left Kitchee in December 2007, Chu became the caretaker coach for the club. His managerial debut for Kitchee came on 11 January 2008, in a 1–1 draw against Eastern.

On 14 November 2013, in light of head coach Àlex Gómez resigning mid-season, Chu and Cheng Siu Chung were named co-caretakers of the Kitchee until the end of the 2013–14 season. As co-caretakers, Chu and Cheng led Kitchee to an undefeated season and the league title. A similar situation happened in the 2015–16 season where head coach Abraham García resigned in March 2016 as manager of Kitchee; Chu was once again named caretaker for the remainder of the season, and led Kitchee to a spot in the 2017 AFC Champions League qualifying round through a victory in the season play-off.

Ahead of the 2016–17 season, Chu was named the permanent manager as well as Director of Football for the club. Kitchee were rewarded for their decision as Chu managed the first team to a domestic treble, capturing the Premier League, the Hong Kong FA Cup and the Senior Shield. The only blemish on their historic season was a 2017 AFC Champions League qualifying playoff round loss to Ulsan Hyundai. Kitchee had taken the K-League club to penalties but came up just short of qualifying for the Champions League group stage for the first time. For his achievements in the 16–17 season, Chu won the Hong Kong Coach of the Year award in the 2017 Hong Kong Top Footballer Awards.

In the following season, Kitchee successfully defended their league title with Chu at the helm. He added two more local trophies (including a victory in the newly established Sapling Cup) en route to winning Coach of the Year two years in a row. At the continental level, Chu led Kitchee to a historic 1–0 win over Kashiwa Reysol in the 2018 AFC Champions League group stage, marking the first victory for any Hong Kong outfit in a top-level AFC competition.

On 3 July 2019, Chu stepped down from his head coaching duties at Kitchee. Chu was subsequently appointed as an assistant to Hong Kong head coach Mixu Paatelainen on 11 August 2019 until the end of the year.

On 23 March 2020, Chu was named as caretaker of Kitchee until the end of the 2019–20 season following Blaž Slišković's decision to step down as head coach. In the midst of the COVID-19 pandemic which saw the HKPL suspended for over 6 months, Chu managed the team in the resumption phase. He eventually led Kitchee to a 4th HKPL title, overtaking rivals Eastern on the Decision Day of 11 October 2020.

On 3 March 2022, Chu was reappointed as the head coach of Kitchee.

On 14 August 2025, Chu left Kitchee after 19 years. The club officially called him a "legendary coach" and thanked him for his contributions in various roles.

On 20 August 2025, Eastern District announced the appointment of Chu as the club’s first-ever Sporting Director.

== Honours ==
=== As a player ===
Sing Tao

- Hong Kong Senior Shield: 1991–92
- Viceroy Cup: 1994–95, 1996–97

=== As a coach ===
Kitchee

- Hong Kong First Division / Premier League (Note: Upon its formation in 2014, Hong Kong Premier League became the top tier of Hong Kong football; the First and Second Divisions then became the second and third tiers, respectively.): 2013–14 (co-caretaker), 2016–17, 2017–18, 2019–20, 2020–21, 2022–23
- Hong Kong Senior Challenge Shield: 2016–17, 2018–19, 2022–23
- Hong Kong FA Cup: 2016–17, 2017–18, 2018–19, 2022–23
- Hong Kong Sapling Cup: 2017–18, 2019–20
- Hong Kong League Cup: 2015–16

=== Individual ===
- Hong Kong Coach of the Year (3): 2017, 2018, 2021
