= Tse Wai Chun (footballer) =

Hong Kong footballer

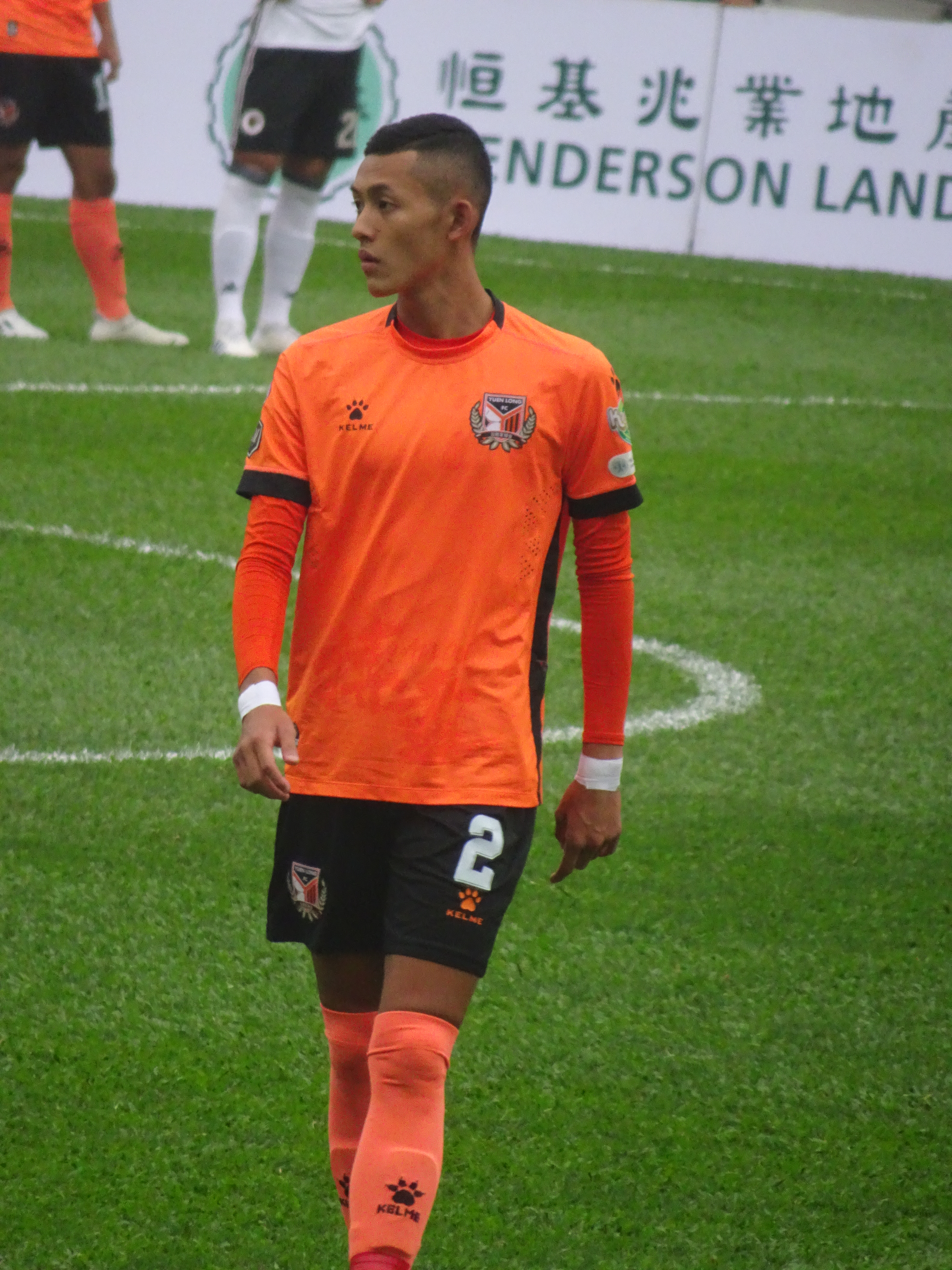

Personal information
- Full name: Danny Tse Wai Chun
- Date of birth: 30 January 1997 (age 29)
- Place of birth: Hong Kong
- Height: 1.73 m (5 ft 8 in)
- Position: Right back

Youth career
- 2012–2015: Hong Kong Rangers

Senior career*
Years	Team	Apps	(Gls)
2015–2018	Hong Kong Rangers	5	(0)
2018–2019	Yuen Long	3	(0)
2019–2020	R&F	0	(0)
2019–2020	→ Hong Kong Rangers (loan)	7	(0)
2020–2023	Hong Kong Rangers	14	(0)

International career
2016	Hong Kong U-19		
- * Club domestic league appearances and goals as of 27 August 2023

Danny Tse Wai Chun (Chinese: 謝偉俊; born 30 January 1997) is a former Hong Kong professional footballer who played as a defender.

== Club career ==
On 27 August 2023, Tse announced his retirement from professional football.
