= Lo Siu Kei =

Hong Kong footballer

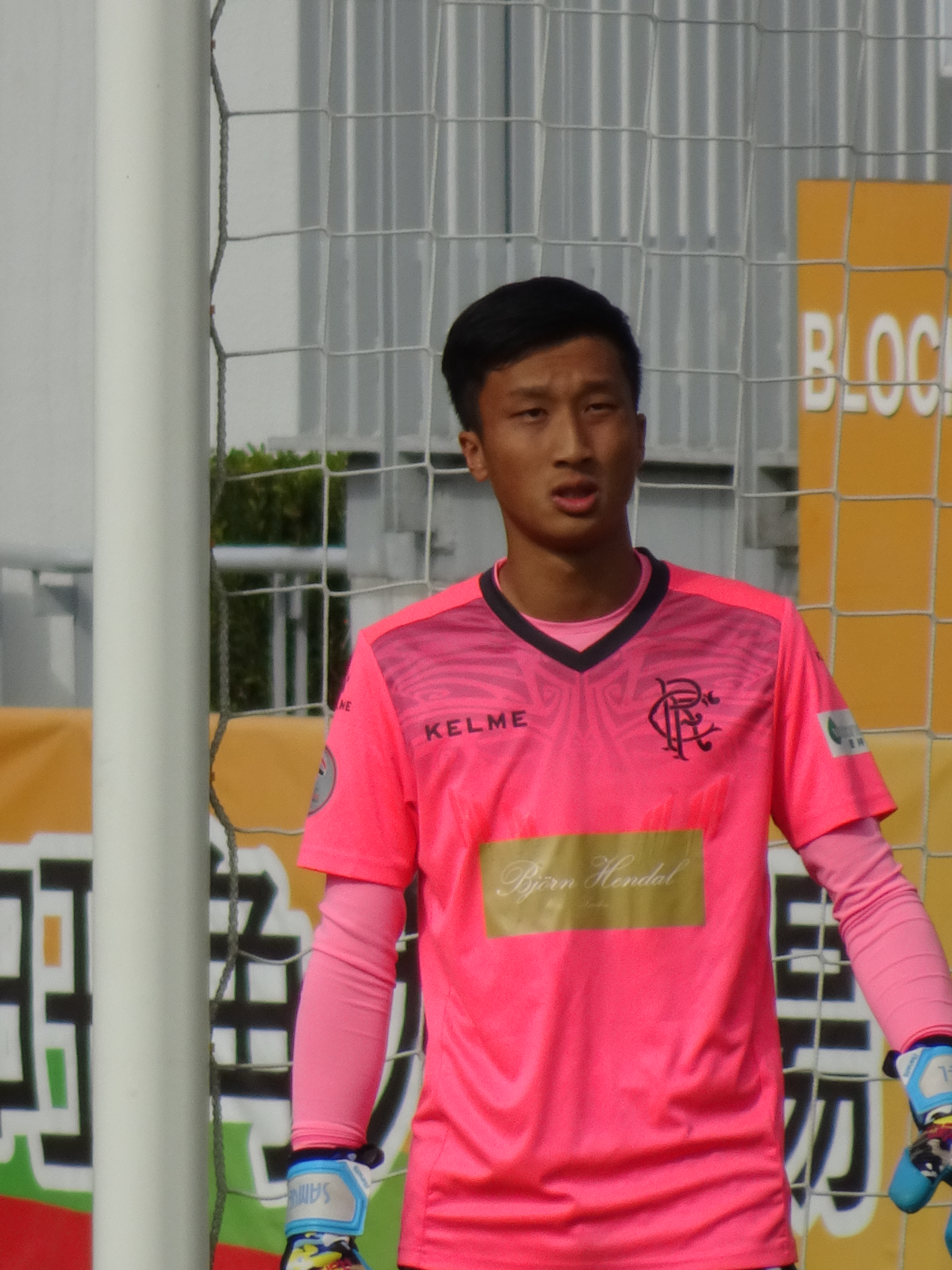

Personal information
- Full name: Lo Siu Kei
- Date of birth: 15 September 2001 (age 25)
- Place of birth: Hong Kong
- Height: 1.78 m (5 ft 10 in)
- Position: Goalkeeper

Team information
- Current team: Tai Po
- Number: 1

Youth career
- 2013–2017: Pegasus

Senior career*
Years	Team	Apps	(Gls)
2017–2019	Resources Capital	17	(0)
2019–2025	Rangers (HKG)	29	(0)
2025–	Tai Po	12	(0)

International career^{‡}
2019	Hong Kong U-19	4	(0)
- * Club domestic league appearances and goals as of 8 November 2026 ‡ National team caps and goals as of 24 October 2019

Lo Siu Kei (Chinese: 盧兆崎; born 15 September 2001) is a Hong Kong professional footballer who currently plays as a goalkeeper for Hong Kong Premier League club Tai Po.

== Club career ==
On 12 August 2019, Lo joined Rangers.

On 27 July 2025, Lo joined Tai Po.

== Honours ==
=== Club ===
Rangers

- Hong Kong Sapling Cup: 2023–24

Tai Po

- Hong Kong FA Cup: 2025–26
- Hong Kong Senior Shield: 2025–26
