= Park Jun-heong =

South Korean footballer (born 1993)

Park Jun-heong 朴俊炯 박준형
Personal information
- Full name: Park Jun-heong
- Date of birth: 25 January 1993 (age 33)
- Place of birth: Pohang, South Korea
- Height: 1.91 m (6 ft 3 in)
- Position: Centre back

Team information
- Current team: Persik Kediri
- Number: 84

Youth career
- 2006: Pohang Steelers U15
- 2007: Kickers Offenbach
- 2008: Mainz 05
- 2009–2011: Daegu FC U18
- 2012–2013: Dong-Eui University

Senior career*
Years	Team	Apps	(Gls)
2014–2015	Pinhalnovense	6	(0)
2015	Armacenenses	8	(0)
2016	Atlético CP	0	(0)
2016–2017	Académico de Viseu	13	(0)
2018–2019	Suwon Samsung Bluewings	2	(0)
2020–2022	Kitchee	24	(1)
2022–2024	Ratchaburi Mitr Phol	18	(3)
2024–2026	Johor Darul Ta’zim	18	(0)
2026–	Persik Kediri	8	(0)
- * Club domestic league appearances and goals as of 31 October 2026

Park Jun-heong (Korean: 박준형; Hanja: 朴俊炯; born 25 January 1993) is a South Korean professional footballer who plays as a defender for Super League club Persik Kediri.

== Youth career ==
Park started his football career with the Pohang Steelers academy in 2006, before being scouted by German club Kickers Offenbach in 2007. In 2008, Park moved to Mainz 05 academy before moving back to his native country to join Daegu FC under-18 team. He stayed with the academy for two years before returning to his studies at Dong-Eui University, where he initially played for the school team. Park also appeared in the 2013 Korean FA Cup on 8 May 2013 against Seongnam FC.

== Club career ==
=== Pinhalnovense ===
After completing his university studies, Park was recruited by Liga Portugal 2 club Pinhalnovense.

He made his professional career debut on 17 September 2016 in a game against Desportivo das Aves.

On 27 December 2019, Park joined Hong Kong Premier League club Kitchee.

On 31 May 2022, Park left the club after finishing his contract.

=== Johor Darul Ta'zim ===
On 27 July 2024, Park joined Malaysian giants Johor Darul Ta'zim.

== Honours ==
=== Club ===
Kitchee

- Hong Kong Premier League: 2019–20
- Hong Kong Sapling Cup: 2019–20

==== Johor Darul Ta'zim ====
- Malaysia Super League: 2024–25
- Malaysia FA Cup: 2024
- Malaysia Cup: 2024–25
- Malaysia Charity Shield: 2025

=== Individual ===
- Malaysia Super League Team of the Season: 2024–25
