= Gao Wen =

Hong Kong footballer

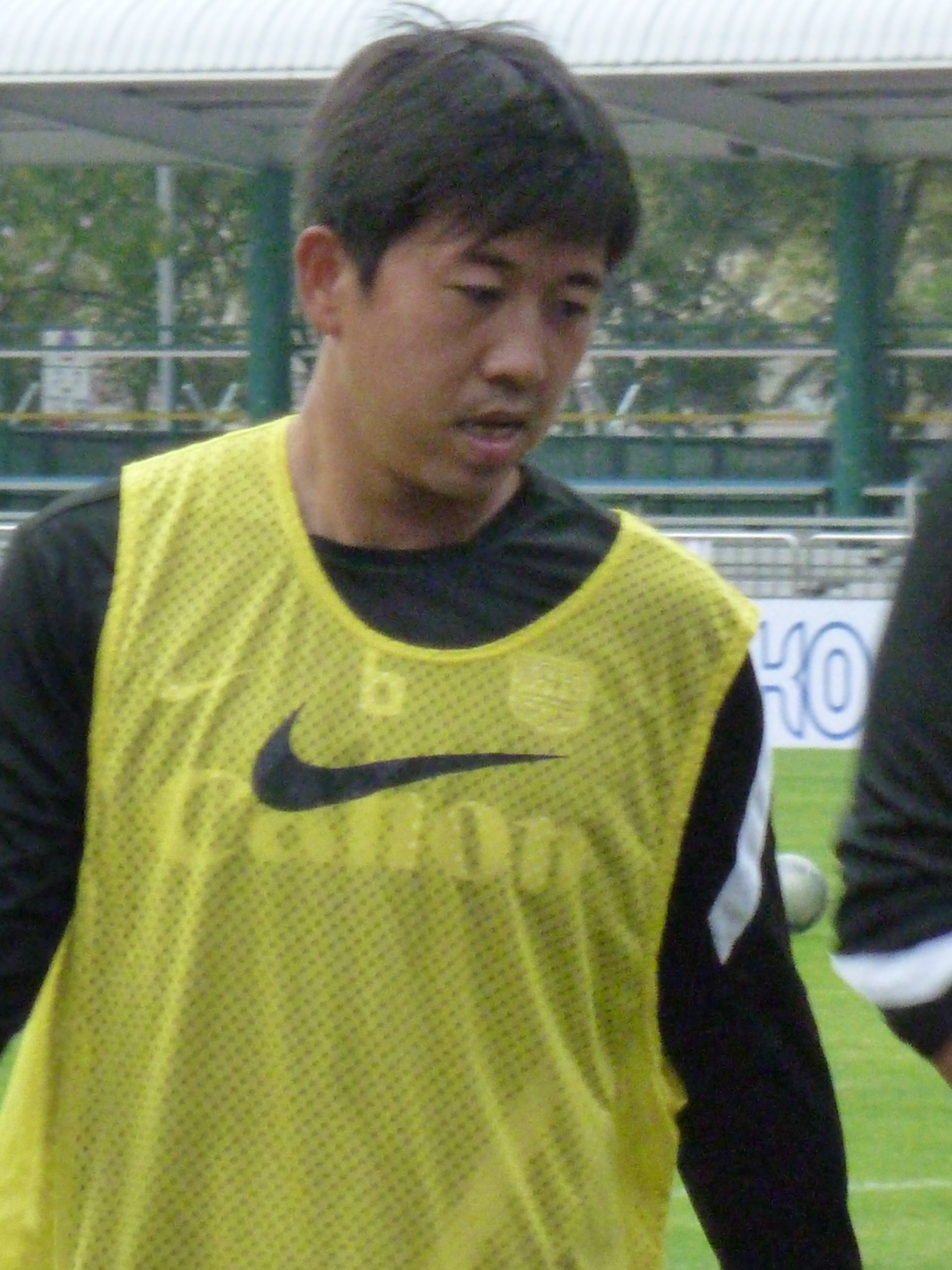

Personal information
- Full name: Gao Wen
- Date of birth: 18 January 1985 (age 41)
- Place of birth: Liaoning, China
- Height: 1.78 m (5 ft 10 in)
- Position: Midfielder

Senior career*
Years	Team	Apps	(Gls)
2006–2016	Kitchee	114	(6)
2016–2019	Resources Capital	30	(3)
2022–2023	St. Joseph's	3	(0)
2023	Lung Moon		
2025–	Orion		

International career^{‡}
2008–2011	Hong Kong	5	(0)

Managerial career
- 2016–: Kitchee (coach)
- * Club domestic league appearances and goals as of 16 May 2026 ‡ National team caps and goals as of 3 June 2011

Gao Wen (Chinese: 高文; pinyin: Gāo Wēn; Jyutping: gou^{1} man^{1}; born 18 January 1985) is a former professional footballer who played as a midfielder. He is currently a coach of Hong Kong Premier League club Kitchee. Born in China, he represented Hong Kong internationally.

== Club career ==
After the 2015–16 season, Gao retired from professional football.

== International career ==
On 19 November 2008, Gao made his international debut for Hong Kong in a friendly match against Macau.
