= Yoon Dong-hun =

South Korean footballer and coach (born 1983)

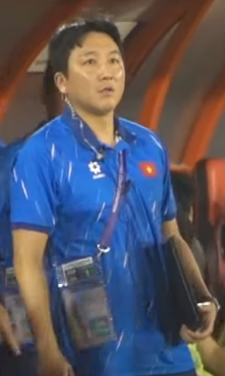
- Yoon Dong-hun in 2025

Personal information
- Full name: Yoon Dong-hun
- Date of birth: 2 May 1983 (age 43)
- Place of birth: South Korea
- Height: 1.73 m (5 ft 8 in)
- Position: Midfielder

Youth career
- 2003–2006: Korea University

Senior career*
| Years | Team | Apps | (Gls) |
| 2007 | Ulsan Hyundai | 1 | (0) |
| 2008–2014 | Ansan Hallelujah / Goyang Hi FC | 152 | (7) |
| 2015 | Wong Tai Sin | 7 | (3) |
| 2015 | Goyang Hi FC | 0 | (0) |
| 2016 | Wong Tai Sin | 9 | (1) |
| 2016–2017 | Biu Chun Glory Sky | 12 | (1) |
| 2017–2019 | Dreams FC | 23 | (3) |
| 2019–2021 | Wing Yee | 12 | (4) |

Managerial career
- 2016–2017: Biu Chun Glory Sky (player-coach)
- 2017–2019: Dreams (player-coach)
- 2019: Dreams (assistant)
- 2019–2024: Kitchee (fitness coach)
- 2024–: Vietnam (fitness coach)
- * Club domestic league appearances and goals as of 19 January 2020

Yoon Dong-hun (Korean: 윤동헌; Hanja: 尹東憲; born 2 May 1983) is a football manager and former South Korean professional footballer who played as a midfielder. He is currently the fitness coach of Vietnam national team.

== Club career ==
He was selected by Ulsan Hyundai in the 2007 K-League draft. He made his professional debut in the League Cup match on 18 April but no appearance in the 2007 season. He moved to Ansan Hallelujah after the unsuccessful debut season ended.
