= Seb Buddle =

Hong Kong footballer

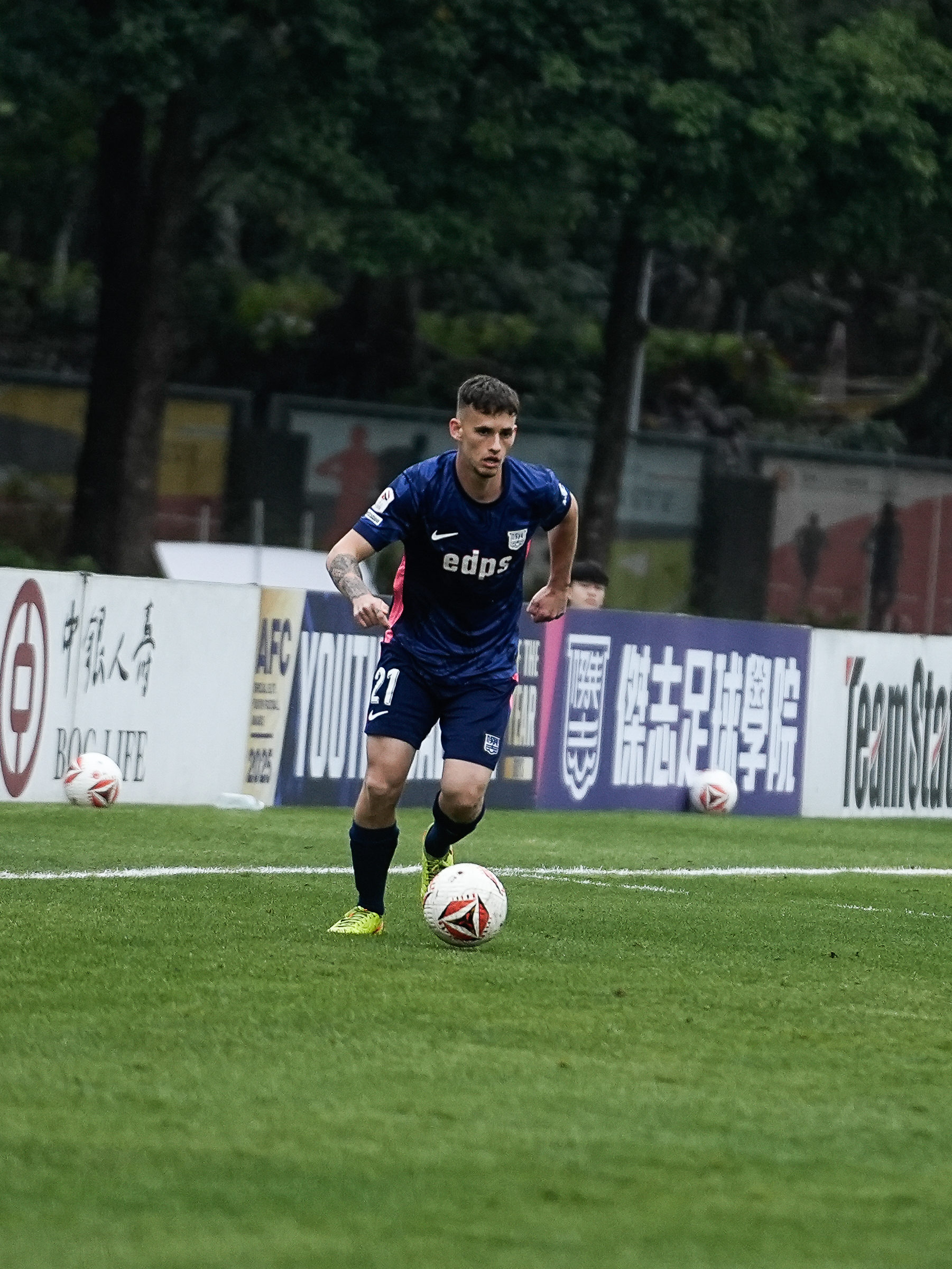

Personal information
- Full name: Sebastian Robert Buddle
- Date of birth: 27 July 1999 (age 27)
- Place of birth: Hong Kong
- Height: 1.78 m (5 ft 10 in)
- Position: Winger

Youth career
- 2010–2016: Southern

Senior career*
Years	Team	Apps	(Gls)
2016–2026	Kitchee	14	(1)
2018–2019	→ Hoi King (loan)	9	(0)
2021–2022	→ HK U23 (loan)	2	(0)
2022–2023	→ Southern (loan)	9	(0)

International career^{‡}
2021	Hong Kong U23	1	(0)
- * Club domestic league appearances and goals as of 17 May 2026 ‡ National team caps and goals as of 28 October 2021

Sebastian Robert Buddle (Chinese: 畢頓; born 27 July 1999) is a former Hong Kong professional footballer who played as a forward.

== Club career ==
On 12 July 2016, Kitchee announced that they had signed Buddle and three others to a professional contract.

On 24 July 2018, following a preseason friendly, Hoi King confirmed that they had acquired Buddle on loan.

On 7 July 2026, Buddle announced his retirement from professional football.

== International career ==
After Buddle had acquired a HKSAR passport in 2019, he is eligible to represent Hong Kong in international competitions.

== Personal life ==
Buddle was born and raised in Discovery Bay by English parents who had moved to Hong Kong in 1994. When he was 18, he renounced his British passport in order to obtain a Hong Kong passport.

Buddle is a graduate of the West Island School.

Buddle received his HKSAR passport in 2019 and was selected for his first U23 camp in June 2020.

== Honour ==
Southern

- Hong Kong Sapling Cup: 2022–23

Kitchee

- Hong Kong Premier League: 2025–26
