= Paulo César (footballer, born 1986) =

Hong Kong footballer

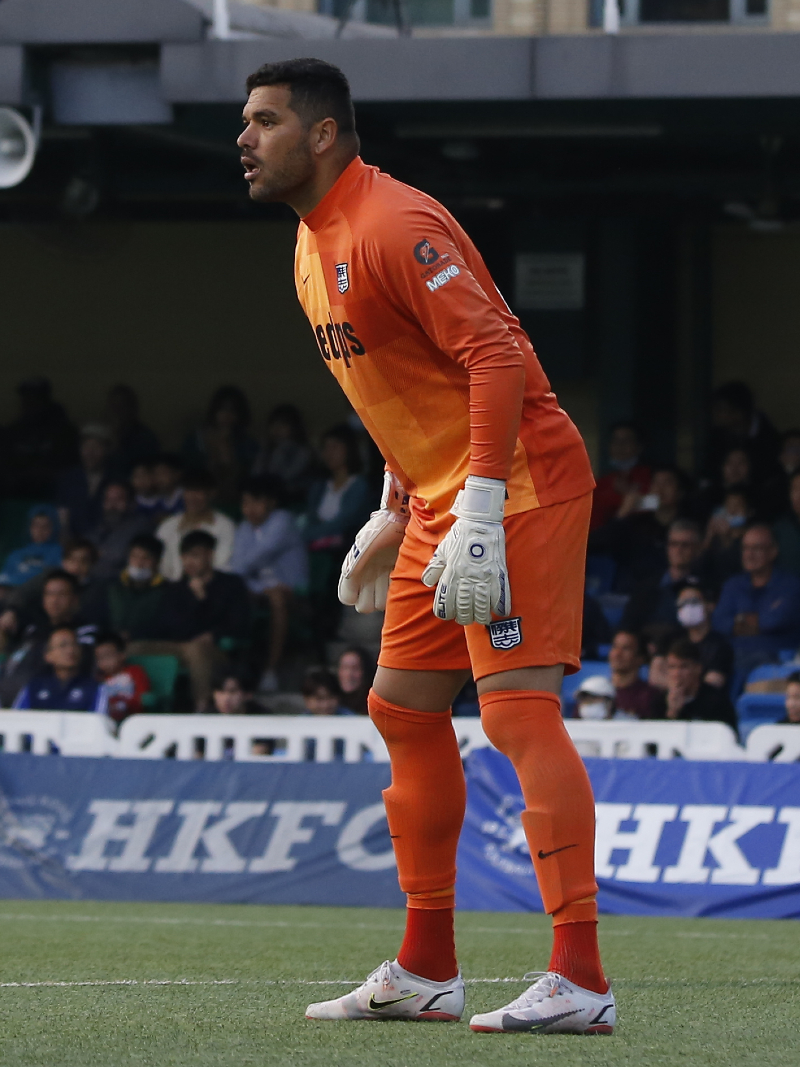

Personal information
- Full name: Paulo César da Silva Argolo
- Date of birth: 27 March 1986 (age 40)
- Place of birth: Aracaju, Brazil
- Height: 1.94 m (6 ft 4 1/2 in)
- Position: Goalkeeper

Team information
- Current team: Eastern District
- Number: 31

Youth career
- 2003–2005: Bahia

Senior career*
Years	Team	Apps	(Gls)
2005–2009	Bahia	0	(0)
2009	→ Atlético Alagoinhas (loan)	2	(0)
2010	Colo Colo-FR	8	(0)
2010–2011	ASA	10	(0)
2011	Crato	0	(0)
2011–2012	Belenenses	3	(0)
2013	Novo Hamburgo	2	(0)
2013–2014	Eastern	10	(0)
2014–2015	Citizen	18	(0)
2015–2016	Rangers (HKG)	12	(0)
2016–2017	Tai Po	8	(0)
2017–2018	Wing Yee	21	(0)
2018–2024	Kitchee	32	(0)
2018–2019	→ Hoi King (loan)	10	(0)
2019	→ Tai Po (loan)	0	(0)
2024–2025	Central & Western	21	(0)
2025–	Eastern District	25	(0)

International career^{‡}
2001–2003	Brazil U17		
2022–2023	Hong Kong	4	(0)
- * Club domestic league appearances and goals as of 8 November 2026 ‡ National team caps and goals as of 23 March 2023

Paulo César da Silva Argolo (Chinese: 保羅; born 27 March 1986), commonly known as Paulo César, is a professional footballer who currently plays as a goalkeeper for Hong Kong Premier League club Eastern District. Born in Brazil, he played for the Hong Kong national team.

== Club career ==
In July 2016, Paulo joined Tai Po.

In August 2018, Paulo joined Kitchee.

On 10 May 2021, Paulo finally earned his first start for Kitchee in which he made his first appearance against Southern in the HKPL.

Paulo became the first-choice goalkeeper in Kitchee's ACL group stage due to the absence of Wang Zhenpeng. On 24 June 2021, he played his first ACL match, beating Thai Port 2–0.

On 23 July 2025, Paulo returned to top flight and joined Eastern District.

== International career ==
On 10 May 2021, Paulo officially announced that he had received a Hong Kong passport, making him eligible to represent Hong Kong internationally.

On 1 June 2022, Paulo made his international debut for Hong Kong in a friendly match against Malaysia.

== Career statistics ==
=== Club ===
As of 31 August 2019.

Club	Season	League			National Cup		League Cup		Continental		Other		Total	
Club	Season	Division	Apps	Goals	Apps	Goals	Apps	Goals	Apps	Goals	Apps	Goals	Apps	Goals
Atlético Alagoinhas (loan)	2009	Série D	0	0	0	0	0	0	–		2 (Note: Appearances in the Campeonato Baiano)	0	2	0
Colo Colo-FR	2010	–			0	0	0	0	–		8	0	8	0
ASA	2010	Série B	6	0	2 (Note: Appearances in the Copa do Brasil)	0	0	0	–		0	0	8	0
ASA	2011	Série B	0	0	2	0	0	0	–		0	0	2	0
ASA	Total		6	0	4	0	0	0	0	0	0	0	10	0
Belenenses	2011–12	Liga de Honra	3	0	0	0	0	0	–		0	0	3	0
Novo Hamburgo	2013	–			0	0	0	0	–		2 (Note: Appearances in the Campeonato Gaúcho)	0	2	0
Eastern	2013–14	First Division	10	0	2 (Note: Appearances in the Hong Kong FA Cup)	0	0	0	2 (Note: Appearances in the AFC Cup)	0	3 (Note: Appearances in the Hong Kong Senior Shield)	0	17	0
Eastern	2014–15	Premier League	0	0	0	0	0	0	0	0	0	0	0	0
Eastern	Total		10	0	2	0	0	0	2	0	3	0	17	0
Citizen	2014–15	First Division	18	0	1	0	0	0	–		0	0	19	0
Hong Kong Rangers	2015–16	Premier League	12	0	0	0	4 (Note: Appearances in the HKFA League Cup)	0	–		0	0	16	0
Tai Po	2016–17	Premier League	8	0	1	0	0	0	–		2	0	11	0
Wing Yee	2017–18	First Division	21	0	4	0	0	0	–		0	0	25	0
Kitchee	2018–19	Premier League	0	0	0	0	0	0	0	0	0	0	0	0
Hoi King (loan)	2018–19	Premier League	10	0	0	0	3 (Note: Appearances in the Sapling Cup)	0	–		0	0	13	0
Tai Po (loan)	2019–20	Premier League	0	0	0	0	0	0	–		0	0	0	0
Total	Brazil		6	0	4	0	0	0	0	0	12	0	22	0
Total	Portugal		3	0	0	0	0	0	0	0	0	0	3	0
Total	Hong Kong		79	0	8	0	7	0	2	0	7	0	103	0
Total	Career total		88	0	12	0	7	0	2	0	17	0	126	0

=== International ===
National team	Year	Apps	Goals
Hong Kong	2022	3	0
Hong Kong	2023	1	0
Total		4	0

#	Date	Venue	Opponent	Result	Competition
1	1 June 2022	National Stadium Bukit Jalil, Kuala Lumpur, Malaysia	Malaysia	0–2	Friendly
2	19 July 2022	Kashima Stadium, Kashima, Japan	Japan	0–6	2022 EAFF E-1 Football Championship
3	21 September 2022	Mong Kok Stadium, Mong Kok, Hong Kong	Myanmar	2–0	Friendly
4	23 March 2023	Mong Kok Stadium, Mong Kok, Hong Kong	Singapore	1–1	Friendly

== Honours ==
Kitchee

- Hong Kong Premier League: 2020–21, 2022–23, 2023–24
- Hong Kong Senior Challenge Shield: 2022–23
- Hong Kong FA Cup: 2022–23
