= Chan Ka Ho =

Hong Kong footballer

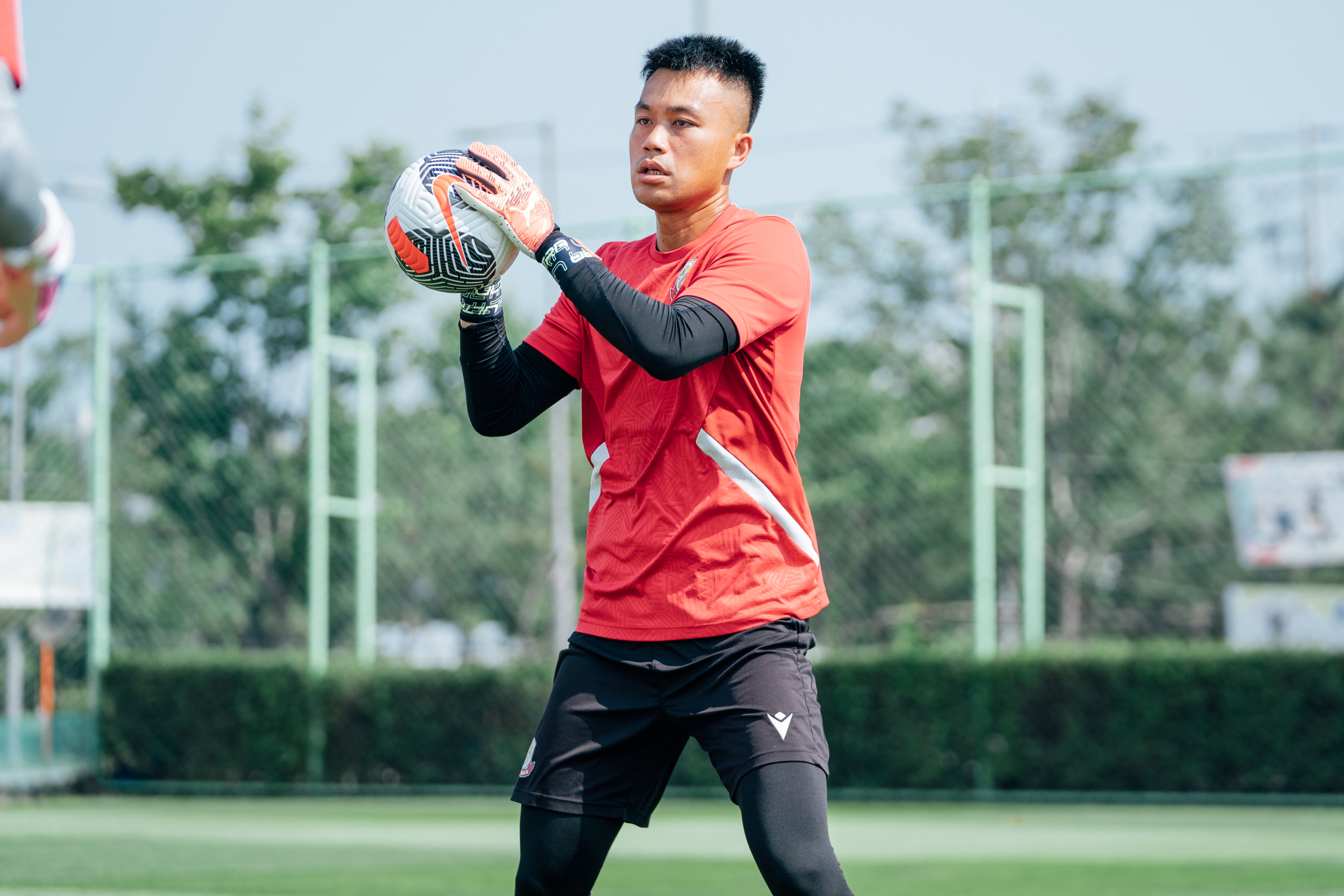

Personal information
- Full name: Chan Ka Ho
- Date of birth: 27 January 1996 (age 30)
- Place of birth: British Hong Kong
- Height: 1.83 m (6 ft 0 in)
- Position: Goalkeeper

Team information
- Current team: Lee Man
- Number: 28

Youth career
- 2008–2014: Kitchee

Senior career*
Years	Team	Apps	(Gls)
2014–2020	Kitchee	0	(0)
2017–2020	→ Yuen Long (loan)	32	(0)
2020	→ Lee Man (loan)	0	(0)
2020–	Lee Man	85	(0)

International career^{‡}
2018	Hong Kong U-23	1	(0)
2022	Hong Kong	2	(0)
- * Club domestic league appearances and goals as of 20 November 2026 ‡ National team caps and goals as of 27 July 2022

Chan Ka Ho (Chinese: 陳嘉豪; born 27 January 1996) is a Hong Kong professional footballer who currently plays as a goalkeeper for Hong Kong Premier League club Lee Man.

== Club career ==
Chan was promoted to the first team of Kitchee in 2014. Starting from 2017, Chan spent three seasons on loan at Yuen Long.

On 3 July 2020, it was announced that Chan had been loaned to Lee Man. He officially joined the club after the end of the 2019–20 season.

== International career ==
On 24 July 2022, Chan made his international debut for Hong Kong in the 2022 EAFF E-1 Football Championship against South Korea.

== Career statistics ==
=== International ===
As of matches played 27 July 2022

National team	Year	Apps	Goals
Hong Kong	2022	2	0
Total		2	0

== Honours ==
=== Club ===
Kitchee

- Hong Kong Premier League: 2014–15, 2016–17
- Hong Kong League Cup: 2014–15, 2015–16
- Hong Kong FA Cup: 2014–15, 2016–17
- Hong Kong Senior Shield: 2016–17

Yuen Long

- Hong Kong Senior Shield: 2017–18

Lee Man

- Hong Kong Premier League: 2023–24
- Hong Kong League Cup: 2025–26

=== International ===
Hong Kong

- Guangdong-Hong Kong Cup: 2018
