= Ho Chun Ting =

Hong Kong footballer

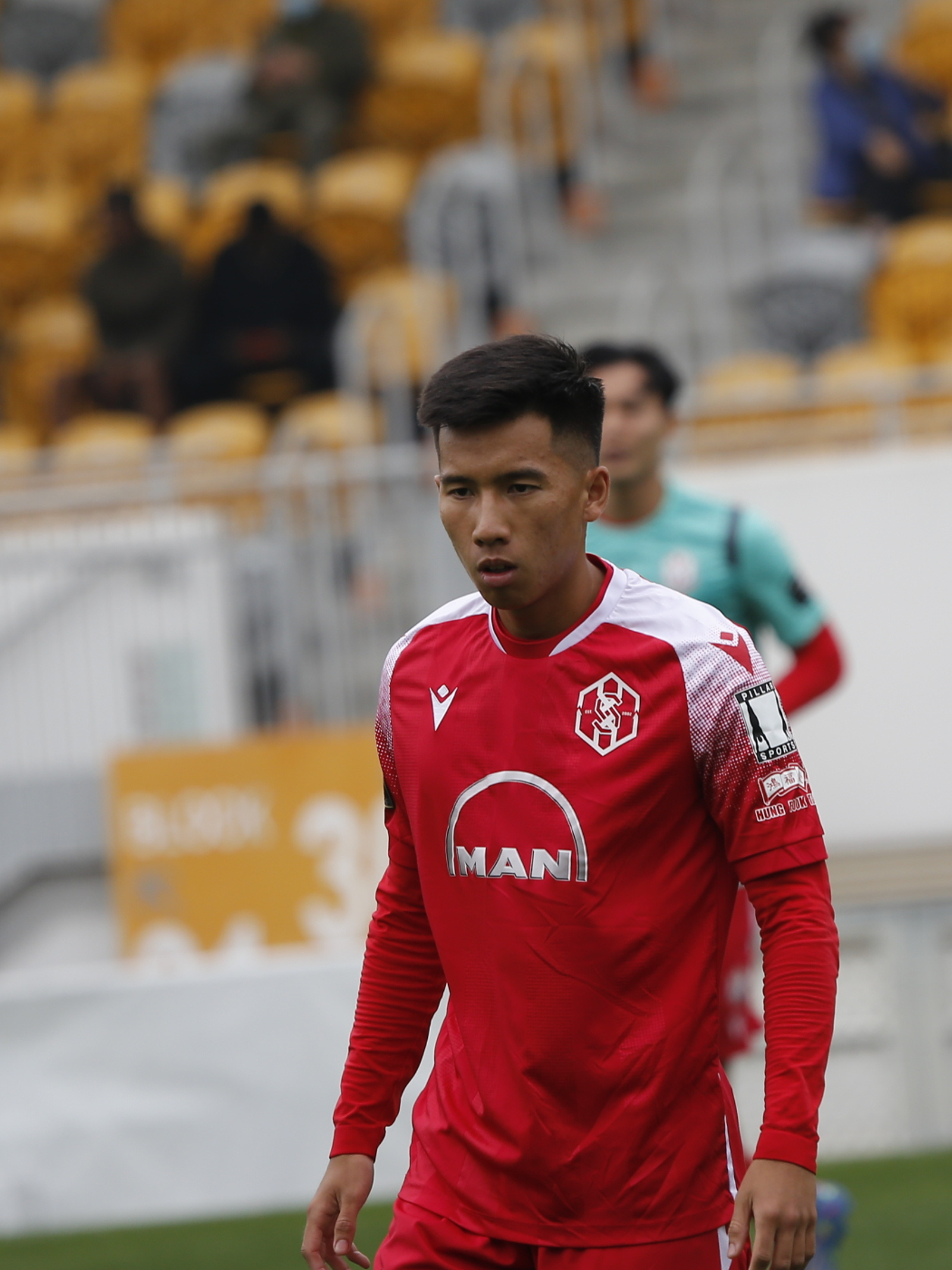

Personal information
- Full name: Justin Ho Chun Ting
- Date of birth: 18 December 1998 (age 27)
- Place of birth: Hong Kong
- Height: 1.68 m (5 ft 6 in)
- Position: Defensive midfielder

Team information
- Current team: Rangers (HKG)
- Number: 10

Youth career
- 2009–2016: Kitchee

Senior career*
| Years | Team | Apps | (Gls) |
| 2016–2018 | Sun Source | 39 | (12) |
| 2018–2023 | Kitchee | 12 | (1) |
| 2018–2019 | → Hoi King (loan) | 13 | (0) |
| 2019–2020 | → Tai Po (loan) | 5 | (0) |
| 2022–2023 | → Southern (loan) | 17 | (0) |
| 2023–2026 | North District | 36 | (3) |
| 2026– | Rangers (HKG) | 10 | (1) |

International career^{‡}
| 2014 | Hong Kong U-16 | 3 | (0) |
- * Club domestic league appearances and goals as of 21 November 2026 ‡ National team caps and goals as of 16 March 2017

Justin Ho Chun Ting (Chinese: 何振廷; born 18 December 1998) is a Hong Kong professional footballer who currently plays as a midfielder for Hong Kong Premier League club Rangers.

== Club career ==
On 20 August 2018, Ho was loaned to Hoi King for the year.

On 16 September 2019, Tai Po acquired Ho on loan from Kitchee.

On 11 October 2020, Ho made his debut for Kitchee, coming on as a 65th-minute substitute against Happy Valley.

On 21 July 2022, Ho joined Southern on loan.

On 14 July 2023, Ho joined North District.

On 16 July 2026, Ho joined Rangers.

== Honours ==
=== Club ===
Kitchee

- Hong Kong Premier League: 2019–20

Southern

- Hong Kong Sapling Cup: 2022–23

=== International ===
Hong Kong

- Guangdong-Hong Kong Cup: 2019
