= Luk Kin Ming =

Hong Kong footballer

Personal information
- Full name: Luk Kin Ming
- Date of birth: 21 April 1996 (age 30)
- Place of birth: Hong Kong
- Height: 1.74 m (5 ft 9 in)
- Position: Defender

Youth career
- 2010–2014: Kitchee

Senior career*
| Years | Team | Apps | (Gls) |
| 2014–2015 | Sun Source | 4 | (0) |
| 2015–2016 | Tung Sing | 10 | (0) |
| 2016–2018 | Sun Source | 35 | (8) |
| 2018–2020 | Rangers (HKG) | 28 | (3) |
| 2020–2021 | Kitchee | 0 | (0) |
| 2021–2022 | Yuen Long | 17 | (0) |
| 2023–2024 | Yuen Long | 16 | (0) |
| 2024–2025 | Citizen AA | 18 | (2) |
| 2025– | Supreme | 19 | (2) |
- * Club domestic league appearances and goals as of 17 May 2026

Luk Kin Ming (Chinese: 陸建鳴; born 21 April 1996) is a former Hong Kong professional footballer who played as a defender.

== Club career ==
On 12 August 2019, Luk signed a professional contract with Rangers, moving up to the Hong Kong Premier League with the club.

On 2 July 2020, Luk signed with Kitchee, returning to the club where he was developed.

On 9 April 2021, Luk along with Peng both terminated their contracts with Kitchee for personal reasons.
