= Peng Lin Lin =

Hong Kong footballer

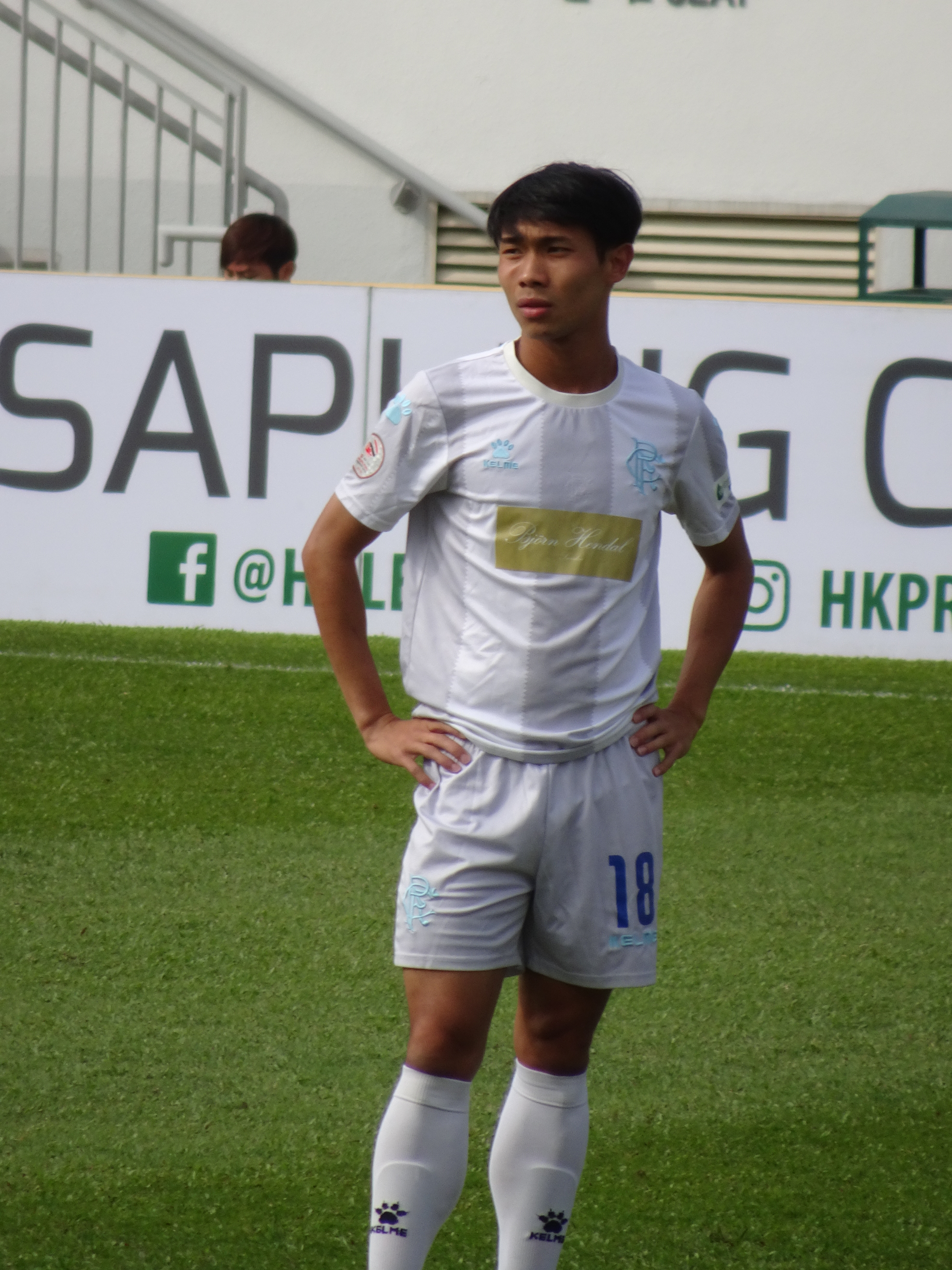

Personal information
- Full name: Peng Lin Lin
- Date of birth: 18 August 1998 (age 28)
- Place of birth: Hong Kong
- Height: 1.75 m (5 ft 9 in)
- Position: Midfielder

Youth career
- 2014–2015: Pegasus
- 2015–2016: Metro Gallery

Senior career*
Years	Team	Apps	(Gls)
2016–2018	St. Joseph's	45	(8)
2018–2019	Dreams FC	12	(1)
2019–2020	Hong Kong Rangers	16	(0)
2020–2021	Kitchee	4	(0)
2021–2024	Sai Kung	17	(7)
2024–2025	Central & Western	22	(0)
2025–	Bright Cerulean	19	(0)

International career^{‡}
2018–2021	Hong Kong U-23	2	(0)
- * Club domestic league appearances and goals as of 22 April 2021 ‡ National team caps and goals as of 22 April 2021

Peng Lin Lin (Chinese: 彭林林; born 18 August 1998) is a former Hong Kong professional footballer who played as a midfielder.

== Club career ==
On 18 July 2018, Dreams FC signed Peng to his first professional contract.

After Dreams FC decided to self-relegate, Peng was signed by fellow Hong Kong club Rangers on 1 August 2019.

On 20 May 2020, Peng moved to Kitchee.

On 9 April 2021, Kitchee confirmed that Peng terminated his contract with the club for personal reasons.

== Career statistics ==
=== Club ===
As of 7 March 2020.

Club	Season	League			National Cup		League Cup		Continental		Other		Total	
Club	Season	Division	Apps	Goals	Apps	Goals	Apps	Goals	Apps	Goals	Apps	Goals	Apps	Goals
Dreams FC	2018–19	Hong Kong Premier League	7	1	1 (Note: Appearances in the Hong Kong FA Cup)	0	3 (Note: Appearances in the Hong Kong Sapling Cup)	0	0	0	1 (Note: Appearances in the Hong Kong Senior Shield)	0	12	1
Rangers	2019–20	Hong Kong Premier League	8	0	1	0	6	0	0	0	1	0	16	0
Career total			15	1	2	0	9	0	0	0	2	0	28	1
