= Barak Braunshtain =

Hong Kong professional football player

Barak Braunshtain 巴拉克
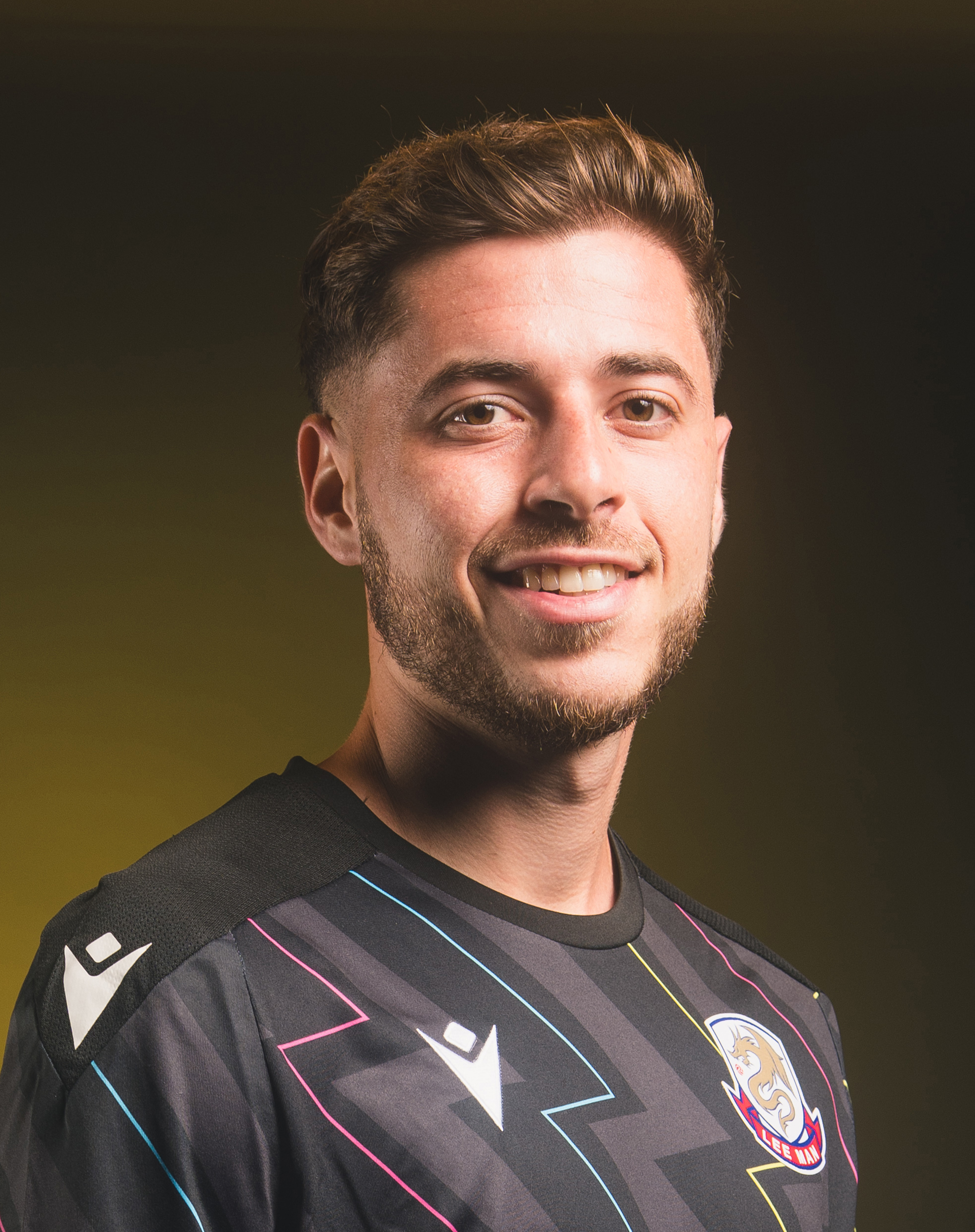

Personal information
- Full name: Barak Braunshtain
- Date of birth: 10 June 1999 (age 27)
- Place of birth: Hong Kong
- Height: 1.75 m (5 ft 9 in)
- Position: Midfielder

Team information
- Current team: Qingdao West Coast
- Number: 18

Youth career
- 2009–2016: Kitchee

Senior career*
Years	Team	Apps	(Gls)
2016–2021	Kitchee	13	(0)
2022	Hapoel Herzliya	6	(0)
2022–2023	Hapoel Kfar Shalem	5	(0)
2023	Hapoel Bik'at HaYarden	13	(5)
2024	Eastern	10	(2)
2024–2025	Rangers (HKG)	23	(2)
2025–2026	Lee Man	7	(2)
2026–	Qingdao West Coast	5	(0)

International career^{‡}
2026–	Hong Kong	1	(0)
- * Club domestic league appearances and goals as of 8 November 2026 ‡ National team caps and goals as of 31 March 2026

Barak Braunshtain (Hebrew: ברק בראונשטיין, Chinese: 巴拉克; born 10 June 1999) is a Hong Kong professional footballer who currently plays as a midfielder for Chinese Super League club Qingdao West Coast and the Hong Kong national team.

== Club career ==
On 29 October 2017, Braunshtain made his debut for Kitchee in the Hong Kong Sapling Cup. Kitchee won 4–0 against Peagsus.

On 3 February 2018, Braunshtain made his full senior league debut for Kitchee. He came on as a substitute for Diego Forlán in the 59th minute of the match. Kitchee would go on to a 5–1 win over Lee Man.

On 24 July 2019, Braunshtain featured in a summer exhibition match against reigning English Premier League champions, Manchester City in front of 22,000 fans at the Hong Kong Stadium. Braunshtain was substituted in at halftime, contributing to Kitchee's only goal of the match. The match finished 1–6 for Manchester City.

On 27 September 2020, Braunshtain scored an impressive free-kick against Southern in the Hong Kong Sapling Cup final, guiding Kitchee to win the 2019–20 Hong Kong Sapling Cup and their second Hong Kong Sapling Cup title.

On 25 August 2021, Braunshtain left Kitchee.

On 5 January 2024, Braunshtain returned to Hong Kong and joined Eastern. On 25 February 2024, Barak scored his first HKPL goal in which his side eased past Resources Capital by four goals.

On 3 August 2024, Braunshtain joined Rangers.

On 7 July 2025, Braunshtain joined Lee Man.

On 16 February 2026, Braunshtain joined Chinese Super League club Qingdao West Coast.

== International career ==
On 13 November 2025, it was announced that Braunshtain had received his HKSAR passport, making him eligible to represent Hong Kong internationally. On the same day, he was called up to the Hong Kong squad for a friendly match against Cambodia and the 2027 AFC Asian Cup qualification match against Singapore.

On 31 March 2026, Braunshtain made his international debut for Hong Kong in the 2027 AFC Asian Cup qualification match against India.

== Personal life ==
Braunshtain was born and raised in Hong Kong by Israeli parents. He was educated at The Island School.

== Career statistics ==
=== International ===
As of 31 March 2026

National team	Year	Apps	Goals
Hong Kong	2026	1	0
Total		1	0

== Honours ==
Kitchee

- Hong Kong Premier League: 2016–17, 2017–18, 2019–20
- Hong Kong Senior Shield: 2016–17, 2018–19
- Hong Kong FA Cup: 2016-17, 2017–18, 2018–19
- Hong Kong Sapling Cup: 2017–18, 2019–20

Eastern

- Hong Kong FA Cup: 2023–24
