= Li Ngai Hoi =

Hong Kong footballer (born 1994)

Li Ngai Hoi 李毅凱
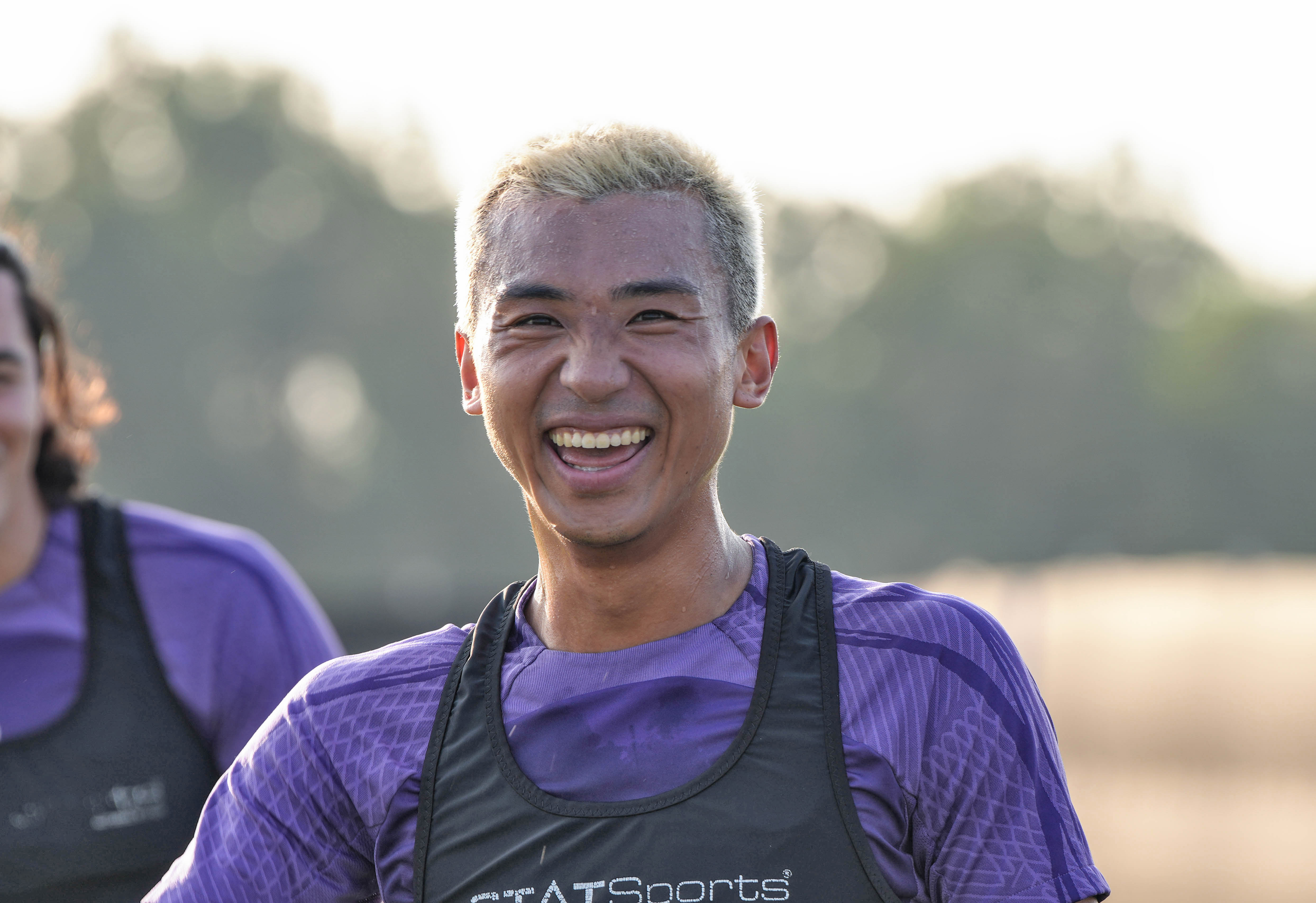

Personal information
- Full name: Li Ngai Hoi
- Date of birth: 15 October 1994 (age 32)
- Place of birth: Hong Kong
- Height: 1.80 m (5 ft 11 in)
- Positions: Centre back; left back

Team information
- Current team: Eastern District
- Number: 13

Youth career
- 2006–2010: Kitchee

Senior career*
Years	Team	Apps	(Gls)
2010–2020	Kitchee	47	(3)
2011–2012	→ Hong Kong Sapling (loan)	10	(0)
2012–2013	→ Pegasus (loan)	4	(0)
2013–2014	→ Southern (loan)	8	(0)
2014	→ Shenyang Zhongze (loan)	0	(0)
2015	→ South China (loan)	1	(0)
2016–2018	→ Pegasus (loan)	13	(0)
2021–2023	Nantong Zhiyun	39	(1)
2023	Rangers (HKG)	4	(2)
2024–2026	Lee Man	37	(2)
2025–2026	→ Eastern District (loan)	8	(1)
2026–	Eastern District	7	(2)

International career^{‡}
2011	Hong Kong U-18		
2012	Hong Kong U-20	1	(0)
2014–2015	Hong Kong U-23	4	(0)
2016–2024	Hong Kong	12	(0)
- * Club domestic league appearances and goals as of 8 November 2026 ‡ National team caps and goals as of 26 March 2024

Li Ngai Hoi (Chinese: 李毅凱; Jyutping: lei^{5} ngai^{6} hoi^{2}; born 15 October 1994) is a Hong Kong professional footballer who currently plays as a centre back for Hong Kong Premier League club Eastern District.

== Early career ==
Li was a student of Yan Chai Hospital Tung Chi Ying Memorial Secondary School and is under their youth football academy scheme with Kitchee. He also plays for the school's football team.

== Club career ==
Li trained with English Premier League club Aston Villa after winning the Be A Pro competition organised by the club and Nike in August 2011. Li was promoted from the youth system of Kitchee in 2010. For the 2011–12 season, he was loaned to Hong Kong Sapling to gain more playing experiences. On 2 October 2011, Li made his debut for Hong Kong Sapling in the 2011–12 Hong Kong Senior Challenge Shield first round first leg away match against Tuen Mun.

In the 2012–13 season, Li joined Pegasus on a loan contract for an undisclosed fee. He returned to Kitchee at the end of the season. In July 2013, Li joined China Super League club Dalian Aerbin for trial. Later, Li joined fellow First Division club Southern on a season-long loan from Kitchee on 7 August 2013.

On 9 January 2018, Li was recalled by Kitchee ahead of their 2018 AFC Champions League campaign.

On 8 February 2021, Kitchee accepted Li's transfer request and stated that they would allow the player to leave immediately. Four days later, it was announced that Li had signed with China League One club Nantong Zhiyun for a transfer fee of RMB $1 million. He would go on to establish himself within the team and helped the club gain promotion to the top tier at the end of the 2022 China League One season. On 28 June 2023, Li made his Chinese Super League debut for the club in the match against Shanghai Shenhua.

On 24 July 2023, Li returned to Hong Kong and joined Rangers. On 16 January 2024, the club agreed to terminate his contract upon his request to pursue other options.

On 29 January 2024, Li joined Lee Man. His move drew the ire of Rangers CEO Philip Lee, who had agreed to terminate Li's contract after the player had originally claimed that he was considering offers from abroad.

On 31 December 2025, Li was loaned to Eastern District until the end of the 2025–26 season. He officially joined the club at the end of the season.

== International career ==
On 3 June 2016, Li made his international debut for Hong Kong in a 2016 AYA Bank Cup match against Vietnam.

On 26 December 2023, Li was named in Hong Kong's squad for the 2023 AFC Asian Cup.

== Career statistics ==
=== Club ===
As of matches played 8 July 2023

Appearances and goals by club, season and competition
Club	Season	League			National Cup		League Cup		Continental		Other		Total	
Club	Season	Division	Apps	Goals	Apps	Goals	Apps	Goals	Apps	Goals	Apps	Goals	Apps	Goals
Kitchee	2015–16	Hong Kong Premier League	9	0	0	0	1 (Note: Appearances in Hong Kong Senior Challenge Shield)	0	8	0	4 (Note: 3 Appearances in HKFA League Cup, 1 Appearances 2015–16 Hong Kong season play-off)	0	22	0
Kitchee	2016–17	Hong Kong Premier League	2	0	1	0	0	0	–		0 (Note: Appearances in Hong Kong Sapling Cup)	0	3	0
Kitchee	2017–18	Hong Kong Premier League	6	0	1	0	0	0	5	0	0	0	12	0
Kitchee	2018–19	Hong Kong Premier League	15	0	2	1	2	1	5	1	3 (Note: 2 Appearances in Hong Kong Sapling Cup, 1 Appearances in Hong Kong Community Cup)	0	27	3
Kitchee	2019–20	Hong Kong Premier League	13	1	1	0	0	0	0	0	6	1	20	2
Kitchee	2020–21	Hong Kong Premier League	2	2	0	0	0	0	0	0	0	0	2	2
Kitchee	Total		47	3	5	1	3	1	18	1	13	1	86	7
Hong Kong Sapling (loan)	2011–12	Hong Kong First Division	10	0	0	0	1	0	–		0 (Note: Appearances in HKFA League Cup)	0	11	0
Pegasus (loan)	2012–13	Hong Kong First Division	4	0	1	0	0	0	–		–		5	0
Southern (loan)	2013–14	Hong Kong First Division	8	0	0	0	2	0	–		–		10	0
Shenyang Zhongze (loan)	2014	China League One	0	0	0	0	–		–		–		0	0
South China (loan)	2014–15	Hong Kong Premier League	1	0	0	0	0	0	4	0	0	0	5	0
Pegasus (loan)	2016–17	Hong Kong Premier League	7	0	0	0	0	0	–		3	0	10	0
Pegasus (loan)	2017–18	Hong Kong Premier League	6	0	0	0	1	0	–		3	0	10	0
Pegasus (loan)	Total		13	0	0	0	1	0	0	0	6	0	20	0
Nantong Zhiyun	2021	China League One	22	1	1	0	–		–		–		23	1
Nantong Zhiyun	2022	China League One	16	0	1	0	–		–		–		17	0
Nantong Zhiyun	2023	Chinese Super League	1	0	1	0	–		–		–		2	0
Nantong Zhiyun	Total		39	1	3	0	0	0	0	0	0	0	42	1
Career total			122	4	9	1	7	1	22	1	19	1	179	8

=== International ===
As of matches played 26 March 2024

National team	Year	Apps	Goals
Hong Kong	2016	2	0
Hong Kong	2017	2	0
Hong Kong	2018	0	0
Hong Kong	2019	1	0
Hong Kong	2020	0	0
Hong Kong	2021	0	0
Hong Kong	2022	0	0
Hong Kong	2023	3	0
Hong Kong	2024	4	0
Total		12	0

#	Date	Venue	Opponent	Result	Competition
1	3 June 2016	Thuwunna Stadium, Myanmar	Vietnam	2–2	2016 AYA Bank Cup
2	6 June 2016	Thuwunna Stadium, Myanmar	Myanmar	0–3	2016 AYA Bank Cup
3	23 March 2017	King Abdullah II Stadium, Jordan	Jordan	0–4	Friendly
4	9 November 2017	Mong Kok Stadium, Hong Kong	Bahrain	0–2	Friendly
5	14 December 2019	Busan Gudeok Stadium, Busan, South Korea	Japan	0–5	2019 EAFF E-1 Football Championship
6	28 March 2023	Sultan Ibrahim Stadium, Johor, Malaysia	Malaysia	0–2	Friendly
7	17 October 2023	Changlimithang Stadium, Thimphu, Bhutan	Bhutan	0–2	2026 FIFA World Cup qualification – AFC first round
8	16 November 2023	Azadi Stadium, Tehran, Iran	Iran	0–4	2026 FIFA World Cup qualification – AFC second round
9	1 January 2024	Baniyas Stadium, Abu Dhabi, United Arab Emirates	China	2–1	Friendly
10	14 January 2024	Khalifa International Stadium, Al Rayyan, Qatar	United Arab Emirates	1–3	2023 AFC Asian Cup
11	23 January 2024	Abdullah bin Khalifa Stadium, Doha, Qatar	Palestine	0–3	2023 AFC Asian Cup
12	26 March 2024	Milliy Stadium, Tashkent, Uzbekistan	Uzbekistan	0–3	2026 FIFA World Cup qualification – AFC second round

== Honours ==
=== Club ===
Kitchee

- Hong Kong Premier League: 2017–18, 2019–20
- Hong Kong Senior Shield: 2018–19
- Hong Kong FA Cup: 2017–18, 2018–19
- Hong Kong Sapling Cup: 2019–20

Lee Man

- Hong Kong Premier League: 2023–24
