= 2019–20 Tai Po FC season =

Tai Po 2019–20 season
- Presidents: Joseph Lee GBS OStJ JP, Cheung Hok Ming GBS SBS JP, Gary Choy
- Director of Football: Fung Hoi Man
- Head Coach: Davor Berber
- Stadium: Tai Po Sports Ground
- Premier League: Withdrew
- Senior Shield: Semi-finals
- FA Cup: Semi-finals
- Sapling Cup: Group stage
- AFC Cup: Withdrew
- Top goalscorer: League: Kim Min-ki & Yuto Nakamura (2 goals); All: Kim Min-ki (6 goals)
- Highest home attendance: 1,026 (vs Kitchee, 19 October 2019)
- Lowest home attendance: 537 (vs Rangers, 24 November 2019)
- Average home league attendance: 793
| Home colours | Away colours |

The 2019–20 season is Tai Po's 12th season in the top-tier division in Hong Kong football. Tai Po will compete in the Premier League, Senior Challenge Shield, FA Cup, Sapling Cup and AFC Cup this season. However, due to the 2020 coronavirus pandemic in Hong Kong, Tai Po announced their withdrawal from the remaining matches this season in May 2020. On 12 June 2020, Tai Po confirmed their withdrawal from participating in the new HKPL season.

== Squad ==
=== First team ===
As of 22 March 2020

Note: Flags indicate national team as defined under FIFA eligibility rules; some limited exceptions apply. Players may hold more than one non-FIFA nationality.

| No. | Pos. | Nation | Player |
|---|---|---|---|
| 1 | GK | (Hong Kong) HKG | Alex Chin |
| 2 | MF | (Cameroon) CMR | Eugene Mbome ^{LP} |
| 3 | DF | (Australia) AUS | Benjamin Van Meurs ^{FP} |
| 4 | MF | (Hong Kong) HKG | Yuto Nakamura (on loan from Kitchee) |
| 5 | MF | (Brazil) BRA | Dudu (captain) ^{FP} |
| 6 | DF | (Hong Kong) HKG | Lew Wai Yip |
| 7 | FW | (South Korea) KOR | Kim Min-ki ^{FP} |
| 8 | MF | (Hong Kong) HKG | Leung Sing Yiu |
| 10 | MF | (Hong Kong) HKG | Michael Luk |
| 11 | FW | (Brazil) BRA | Michel Lugo ^{FP} |
| 12 | MF | (Hong Kong) HKG | Cheng Tsz Sum |
| 13 | MF | (Hong Kong) HKG | Yeung Chi Lun |
| 14 | MF | (Hong Kong) HKG | Liu Chi Him |
| 15 | DF | (Hong Kong) HKG | Yeung Tsz Pan |
| 17 | MF | (Hong Kong) HKG | Chan Man Fai |

| No. | Pos. | Nation | Player |
|---|---|---|---|
| 18 | MF | (Hong Kong) HKG | Fung Kwun Ming |
| 19 | GK | (Hong Kong) HKG | Felix Luk |
| 20 | GK | (Hong Kong) HKG | Ho Yui |
| 22 | FW | (Hong Kong) HKG | Chiu Siu Wai |
| 23 | MF | (Hong Kong) HKG | Sun Ming Him |
| 24 | MF | (Hong Kong) HKG | Toby Down |
| 25 | FW | (Hong Kong) HKG | Hui Ka Lok |
| 27 | MF | (Hong Kong) HKG | Fong Chun Yip |
| 28 | MF | (Hong Kong) HKG | Che Runqiu |
| 31 | DF | (Hong Kong) HKG | Philip To |
| 35 | GK | (Serbia) SRB | Željko Kuzmić ^{FP} |
| 44 | MF | (Hong Kong) HKG | Ho Chun Ting (on loan from Kitchee) |
| 77 | FW | (South Korea) KOR | Kim Seung-yong ^{FP} |
| 80 | MF | (Hong Kong) HKG | Ng Man Hei |

Remarks:
^{LP} These players are registered as local players in Hong Kong domestic football competitions.
^{FP} These players are registered as foreign players.

== Transfers ==
=== Transfers in ===
| Date from | Position | Nationality | Name | From | Fee | Ref. |
|---|---|---|---|---|---|---|
| 6 August 2019 | GK | (Hong Kong) | Felix Luk | Hoi King | Free | |
| 6 August 2019 | GK | (Hong Kong) | Ho Yui | Double Flower | Free | |
| 6 August 2019 | DF | (Hong Kong) | Lew Wai Yip | Hoi King | Free | |
| 6 August 2019 | DF | (Hong Kong) | Che Runqiu | Southern | Free | |
| 6 August 2019 | DF | (Hong Kong) | Philip To | Hoi King | Free | |
| 6 August 2019 | MF | (Cameroon) (Hong Kong) | Eugene Mbome | Pegasus | Free | |
| 6 August 2019 | MF | (South Korea) | Kim Min-ki | Hoi King | Free | |
| 6 August 2019 | MF | (Hong Kong) | Michael Luk | Southern | Free | |
| 6 August 2019 | MF | (Hong Kong) | Liu Chi Him Matthew | Hoi King | Free | |
| 6 August 2019 | MF | (Hong Kong) | Chan Man Fai | Southern | Free | |
| 6 August 2019 | MF | (Hong Kong) | Hui Ka Lok | Lee Man | Free | |
| 6 August 2019 | MF | (Hong Kong) | Ng Man Hei | Kwun Tong | Free | |
| 6 August 2019 | FW | (Hong Kong) | Sun Ming Him | Hoi King | Free | |
| August 2019 | MF | (Hong Kong) | Fong Chun Yip | Youth team | Free | |
| 4 October 2019 | MF | (Hong Kong) | Fung Kwun Ming | (United States) Nebraska Bugeaters | Free | |
| 18 October 2019 | DF | (Australia) | Benjamin Van Meurs | (Australia) Sydney FC NPL | Free | |
| 24 February 2020 | FW | (South Korea) | Kim Seung-yong | (South Korea) Incheon United | Free | |
| 6 March 2020 | GK | (Serbia) | Željko Kuzmić | (Mongolia) Deren FC | Free | |

=== Transfers out ===
| Date from | Position | Nationality | Name | To | Fee | Ref. |
|---|---|---|---|---|---|---|
| 1 July 2019 | GK | (Hong Kong) | Li Hon Ho | Lee Man | Released | |
| 1 July 2019 | GK | (Hong Kong) | Tsang Man Fai | Eastern | Released | |
| 1 July 2019 | DF | (Hong Kong) | Cheung Chak Wai | Icanfield | Released | |
| 1 July 2019 | DF | (Hong Kong) | Chak Ting Fung | Eastern | Released | |
| 1 July 2019 | DF | (Hong Kong) | Lee Ka Ho | Eastern | Released | |
| 1 July 2019 | DF | (Hong Kong) | Fung Hing Wa | Eastern | Released | |
| 1 July 2019 | DF | (Brazil) | Eduardo Praes | Eastern | Released | |
| 1 July 2019 | DF | (Hong Kong) | Jean-Jacques Kilama | Rangers | Released | |
| 1 July 2019 | MF | (Hong Kong) | Chan Siu Kwan | Southern | Released | |
| 1 July 2019 | MF | (Hong Kong) | Wong Cho Sum | King Fung | Released | |
| 1 July 2019 | MF | (Macau) (Hong Kong) | Lam Ngai Tong | Happy Valley | Released | |
| 1 July 2019 | MF | (Hong Kong) | Chan Hiu Fung | Pegasus | Released | |
| 1 July 2019 | MF | (Hong Kong) | Au Yeung Yiu Chung | Rangers | Released | |
| 1 July 2019 | MF | (Hong Kong) | Wong Wai | Eastern | Released | |
| 1 July 2019 | MF | (Hong Kong) | Lee Ka Yiu | Eastern | Released | |
| 1 July 2019 | MF | (Hong Kong) | Leung Kwun Chung | Eastern | Released | |
| 1 July 2019 | MF | (Brazil) | João Emir | Eastern | Released | |
| 1 July 2019 | FW | (Australia) | Harry Sawyer | (Australia) South Melbourne | Released | |
| 1 July 2019 | FW | (Brazil) | Igor Sartori | R&F | Released | |
| 1 July 2019 | FW | (Hong Kong) | Chung Wai Keung | Eastern | Released | |
| 1 January 2020 | FW | (Hong Kong) | Sandro | Eastern | Released | |
| April 2020 | FW | (Brazil) | Michel Lugo | | Released | |
| April 2020 | DF | (Australia) | Benjamin Van Meurs | | Released | |
| May 2020 | GK | (Serbia) | Željko Kuzmić | | Released | |
| May 2020 | DF | (Brazil) | Dudu | R&F | Released | |
| May 2020 | MF | (South Korea) | Kim Min-ki | | Released | |
| May 2020 | FW | (South Korea) | Kim Seung-yong | | Released | |
| 1 July 2020 | MF | (Hong Kong) | Cheng Tsz Sum | Eastern | Released | |
| 1 July 2020 | MF | (Hong Kong) | Toby Down | Eastern | Released | |

=== Loans in ===
| Start Date | End Date | Position | Nationality | Name | From Club | Fee | Ref. |
|---|---|---|---|---|---|---|---|
| 16 September 2019 | 31 December 2019 | GK | (Brazil) | Paulo César | Kitchee | Undisclosed | |
| 16 September 2019 | 31 May 2020 | MF | (Hong Kong) | Ho Chun Ting | Kitchee | Undisclosed | |
| 25 September 2019 | 31 May 2020 | MF | (Hong Kong) | Yuto Nakamura | Kitchee | Undisclosed | |

=== Loans out ===
| Start Date | End Date | Position | Nationality | Name | To Club | Fee | Ref. |
|---|---|---|---|---|---|---|---|
| 2 October 2019 | 19 January 2020 | FW | (Hong Kong) | Chiu Siu Wai | Happy Valley | Undisclosed | |

== Team staff ==
| Position | Staff |
|---|---|
| Director of football | (Hong Kong) Fung Hoi Man |
| Head coach | (Serbia) Davor Berber |
| Assistant coach | (Serbia) Ivan Kurtušić |
| Assistant coach | (Hong Kong) Lau Chi Keung |
| Assistant coach | (Hong Kong) Chan Yuk Chi |
| Assistant coach | (Hong Kong) Lui Chi Hing |
| Goalkeeping coach | (Hong Kong) Tung Ho Yin |
| Team manager | (Hong Kong) Fung Yuk Lun Alan |
| General Affairs | (Hong Kong) Chow Ho Chun |
| Secretary | (Hong Kong) Chan Ping |

== Competitions ==
=== Hong Kong Premier League ===
==== Table ====
| Pos | Team | Pld | W | D | L | GF | GA | GD | Pts | Qualification or relegation |
|---|---|---|---|---|---|---|---|---|---|---|
| 6 | Happy Valley | 10 | 0 | 1 | 9 | 6 | 31 | −25 | 1 | |
| 7 | Pegasus (D) | 0 | 0 | 0 | 0 | 0 | 0 | 0 | 0 | Withdrew, record expunged (Note: Pegasus and Rangers withdrew from the league due to the 2020 coronavirus pandemic in Hong Kong, and their records were expunged.) |
| 8 | Rangers (D) | 0 | 0 | 0 | 0 | 0 | 0 | 0 | 0 | Withdrew, record expunged |
| 9 | Tai Po (D, R) | 0 | 0 | 0 | 0 | 0 | 0 | 0 | 0 | Withdrew, record expunged Relegation to Hong Kong First Division League (Note: Tai Po and Yuen Long withdrew from the league due to the 2020 coronavirus pandemic in Hong Kong, and their records were expunged. On 12 June 2020, it was announced that they would self-relegate due to lack of funds.) |
| 10 | Yuen Long (D, R) | 0 | 0 | 0 | 0 | 0 | 0 | 0 | 0 | Withdrew, record expunged Relegation to Hong Kong First Division League |

Source: Hong Kong Football Association
Rules for classification: 1) Points; 2) Head-to-head points; 3) Head-to-head goal difference; 4) Head-to-head goals scored; 5) Goal difference; 6) Goals scored; 7) Fair-play points; 8) Drawing lots (Play-off if the winner has to be decided).
(D) Disqualified; (R) Relegated
Notes:

Win Draw Loss

=== Hong Kong Sapling Cup ===
==== Group stage ====
| Pos | Team | Pld | W | D | L | GF | GA | GD | Pts | Qualification |
|---|---|---|---|---|---|---|---|---|---|---|
| 1 | Southern (A) | 8 | 4 | 3 | 1 | 8 | 5 | +3 | 15 | Advance to Final |
| 2 | (China) R&F | 8 | 4 | 1 | 3 | 18 | 12 | +6 | 13 | |
| 3 | Yuen Long | 8 | 3 | 3 | 2 | 19 | 17 | +2 | 12 | |
| 4 | Happy Valley | 8 | 2 | 2 | 4 | 13 | 17 | −4 | 8 | |
| 5 | Tai Po | 8 | 1 | 3 | 4 | 18 | 25 | −7 | 6 | |

Source: Hong Kong Football Association
Rules for classification: 1) Points; 2) Head-to-head points; 3) Head-to-head goal difference; 4) Goal difference; 5) Goals scored.
(A) Advance to a further round

=== Hong Kong FA Cup ===
| 8 March 2020 First round | Lee Man | 2–2 (a.e.t.) (3–4 p) | Tai Po | Tseung Kwan O |
| 14:30 (UTC+8) | Cheng Siu Kwan 8'; N'dri 45+1' (pen.) | Report | Kim Min-ki 1'; Dudu 10' | Stadium: Tseung Kwan O Sports Ground; Attendance: 0 Referee: Luk Kin Sun |
| | Penalties |
| | Shapoval (penalty scored); Tse Long Hin (penalty scored); Pinheiro (penalty scored); Leong Ka Hang (penalty missed); N'dri (penalty missed) | | (penalty scored) Kim Seung-yong; (penalty scored) Nakamura; (penalty scored) Lugo; (penalty scored) Michael Luk |

| 16 March 2020 Quarter-finals | Southern | 1–4 | Tai Po | Tseung Kwan O |
| 14:30 (UTC+8) | Chan Kong Pan 23' | Report | Dudu 13'; Luk 17'; Nakamura 55'; Kim Seung-yong 85' | Stadium: Tseung Kwan O Sports Ground; Attendance: 0 Referee: Liu Kwok Man |

| 22 March 2020 Semi-finals | Tai Po | 2–2 (a.e.t.) (3–5 p) | R&F | Tseung Kwan O |
| 14:30 (UTC+8) | Dudu 90+5'; Lugo 98' | Report | Satori 67'; Leonço 107' | Stadium: Tseung Kwan O Sports Ground; Attendance: 0 Referee: Ho Wai Sing |
| | Penalties |
| | Nakamura (penalty scored); Chan Man Fai (penalty missed); Lugo (penalty scored); Luk (penalty scored) | | (penalty scored) Satori; (penalty scored) Leonço; (penalty scored) Lo Kwan Yee; (penalty scored) Leung Nok Hang; (penalty scored) Matt Lam |
