= 2019–20 Yuen Long FC season =

Yuen Long 2019–20 season
- President: Wilson Wong
- Chairman: Wong Tak Sun
- Head coach: Kwok Kar Lok
- Stadium: Yuen Long Stadium
- Premier League: Withdrew
- Senior Shield: First Round
- FA Cup: Quarter-finals
- Sapling Cup: Group Stage
- Top goalscorer: League: Juninho (3 goals); All: Mikael (9 goals)
- Highest home attendance: 791 (vs Eastern, 31 August 2019)
- Lowest home attendance: 608 (vs Happy Valley, 21 December 2019)
- Average home league attendance: 682
Home colours	Away colours

The 2019–20 season was Yuen Long's 26th season in the top-tier division in Hong Kong football. Yuen Long was set to compete in the Premier League, Senior Challenge Shield, FA Cup and Sapling Cup this season. However, due to the 2020 coronavirus pandemic in Hong Kong, Yuen Long announced their withdrawal from the remaining matches this season in April 2020 and later confirmed their withdrawal from the new HKPL season on 12 June 2020.

== Squad ==
=== First Team ===
As of 12 March 2020

Note: Flags indicate national team as defined under FIFA eligibility rules; some limited exceptions apply. Players may hold more than one non-FIFA nationality.

No.	Pos.	Nation	Player
1	GK	(Hong Kong) HKG	Chan Ka Ho (on loan from Kitchee)
2	MF	(Hong Kong) HKG	Chan Yiu Yin
4	DF	(Hong Kong) HKG	Leung Wai Fung
5	DF	(Hong Kong) HKG	Tsang Chi Hau (on loan from Eastern)
6	DF	(Chinese Taipei) TPE	Wang Ruei ^{FP}
8	MF	(Brazil) BRA	Kessi ^{FP}
9	FW	(Brazil) BRA	Maicon Santana ^{FP}
10	MF	(Brazil) BRA	Mikael ^{FP}
11	MF	(Hong Kong) HKG	Tsang Tsz Hin
12	GK	(Hong Kong) HKG	Yip Ka Yu
13	GK	(Hong Kong) HKG	Wong Tsz Ho
14	DF	(Hong Kong) HKG	Cheng King Ho (on loan from Eastern)
15	DF	(Hong Kong) HKG	Cheung Ho Kok
16	DF	(Hong Kong) HKG	Law Chun Ting

No.	Pos.	Nation	Player
17	MF	(Hong Kong) HKG	Wong Pun Ming
18	FW	(Brazil) BRA	Juninho ^{FP} (on loan from Pegasus)
19	MF	(Hong Kong) HKG	Yiu Ho Ming (on loan from Eastern)
20	FW	(Hong Kong) HKG	Tang Tsz Kwan
21	DF	(Hong Kong) HKG	Lau Tak Yan
22	DF	(Hong Kong) HKG	Fábio (captain)
23	MF	(Hong Kong) HKG	Wong Chun Hin
24	MF	(Hong Kong) HKG	Lai Kak Yi
25	FW	(Hong Kong) HKG	Caleb Ekwegwo
38	FW	(Hong Kong) HKG	Yip Tsz Chun
61	DF	(Hong Kong) HKG	Tsang Siu Hong
84	MF	(Hong Kong) HKG	Pang Chiu Yin
88	MF	(Hong Kong) HKG	Lai Hau Hei
92	FW	(Hong Kong) HKG	Cheung Man Lok

Remarks:
^{LP} These players are registered as local players in Hong Kong domestic football competitions.
^{FP} These players are registered as foreign players.

== Transfers ==
=== Transfers in ===
Date from	Position	Nationality	Name	From	Fee	Ref.
August 2019	GK	(Hong Kong)	Wong Tsz Ho	Kitchee	Free	
August 2019	DF	(Hong Kong)	Cheung Ho Kok	R&F Youth team	Free	
August 2019	DF	(Hong Kong)	Tsang Siu Hong	Metro Gallery	Free	
August 2019	MF	(Hong Kong)	Chan Yiu Yin	Youth team	Free	
August 2019	MF	(Brazil)	Mikael	(Brazil) América FC	Free	
August 2019	MF	(Hong Kong)	Wong Pun Ming	Youth team	Free	
August 2019	MF	(Hong Kong)	Wong Chun Hin Hinson	Dreams FC	Free	
August 2019	MF	(Hong Kong)	Pang Chiu Yin	Dreams FC	Free	
August 2019	MF	(Hong Kong)	Lai Hau Hei	Dreams FC	Free	
August 2019	MF	(Hong Kong)	Tsang Tsz Hin	Hoi King	Free	
August 2019	FW	(Brazil)	Katê	(Brazil) Juazeirense	Free	
August 2019	FW	(Brazil)	Maicon Santana	(Brazil) Juventus-SC	Free	
August 2019	FW	(Hong Kong)	Tang Tsz Kwan	Dreams FC	Free	
August 2019	FW	(Hong Kong)	Cheung Man Lok	Resources Capital	Free	
January 2020	FW	(Hong Kong)	Caleb Ekwegwo	King Fung	Free	

=== Transfers out ===
Date from	Position	Nationality	Name	To	Fee	Ref.
1 July 2019	DF	(Hong Kong)	Tse Wai Chun	R&F	Released	
1 July 2019	DF	(Hong Kong)	Cheung Kin Fung	Eastern	End of loan	
1 July 2019	DF	(Hong Kong)	Yim Kai Wa	Pegasus	Released	
1 July 2019	DF	(Hong Kong)	Chan Pak Hang	Pegasus	Released	
1 July 2019	DF	(Brazil)	Tomas	Rangers	Released	
1 July 2019	DF	(Hong Kong)	Fok Pak Hin	Central & Western	Released	
1 July 2019	DF	(Hong Kong)	Jou Pak Kwan	North District	Released	
1 July 2019	MF	(Brazil)	Cleiton	Kitchee	Released	
1 July 2019	MF	(Hong Kong)	Chan Hiu Fung	Tai Po	End of loan	
1 July 2019	MF	(Hong Kong)	Kwok Tsz Kaai	Pegasus	Released	
1 July 2019	MF	(Hong Kong)	Wong Pun Wai	Rangers	Released	
1 July 2019	MF	(Hong Kong)	Lo Tsz Kit	Wong Tai Sin	Released	
1 July 2019	FW	(Brazil)	Jean Moser	Eastern	Released	
1 July 2019	FW	(Hong Kong)	Chan Kwong Ho	Southern	Released	
1 July 2019	FW	(Hong Kong)	Lee Oi Hin	Pegasus	Released	
15 January 2020	FW	(Brazil)	Katê		Released	
1 June 2020	DF	(Chinese Taipei)	Wang Ruei		Released	
1 June 2020	MF	(Brazil)	Mikael	Happy Valley	Released	
1 June 2020	MF	(Brazil)	Kessi		Released	
1 June 2020	FW	(Brazil)	Maicon Santana		Released	
1 July 2020	GK	(Hong Kong)	Yip Ka Yu		Released	
9 September 2020	MF	(Hong Kong)	Wong Chun Hin	Rangers	Released	
9 September 2020	FW	(Hong Kong)	Tang Tsz Kwan	Rangers	Released	

=== Loans in ===
Start Date	End Date	Position	Nationality	Name	From Club	Fee	Ref.
August 2019	31 May 2020	DF	(Hong Kong)	Tsang Chi Hau	Eastern	Undisclosed	
August 2019	31 May 2020	FW	(Brazil)	Juninho	Pegasus	Undisclosed	
August 2019	31 May 2020	GK	(Hong Kong)	Chan Ka Ho	Kitchee	Undisclosed	
6 September 2019	31 May 2020	DF	(Hong Kong)	Cheng King Ho	Eastern	Undisclosed	
15 January 2020	31 May 2020	MF	(Hong Kong)	Yiu Ho Ming	Eastern	Undisclosed	

=== Loans out ===
Start Date	End Date	Position	Nationality	Name	To Club	Fee	Ref.
6 September 2019	End of season	GK	(Hong Kong)	So Chi Wai	Rangers	Undisclosed	

== Team staff ==
Position	Staff
Head coach	(Hong Kong) Kwok Kar Lok
Assistant coach	(Hong Kong) Chan Man Chun
Assistant coach	(Hong Kong) Yeung Hin Fai
Assistant coach	(Hong Kong) Fábio Lopes
Assistant coach	(Hong Kong) Yip Tsz Chun
Goalkeeper coach	(Hong Kong) Leung Cheuk Cheung
Team Manager	(Hong Kong) Kwok Zing Yin

== Competitions ==
=== Hong Kong Premier League ===
==== Table ====
Pos	Team	Pld	W	D	L	GF	GA	GD	Pts	Qualification or relegation
6	Happy Valley	10	0	1	9	6	31	−25	1	
7	Pegasus (D)	0	0	0	0	0	0	0	0	Withdrew, record expunged (Note: Pegasus and Rangers withdrew from the league due to the 2020 coronavirus pandemic in Hong Kong, and their records were expunged.)
8	Rangers (D)	0	0	0	0	0	0	0	0	Withdrew, record expunged
9	Tai Po (D, R)	0	0	0	0	0	0	0	0	Withdrew, record expunged Relegation to Hong Kong First Division League (Note: Tai Po and Yuen Long withdrew from the league due to the 2020 coronavirus pandemic in Hong Kong, and their records were expunged. On 12 June 2020, it was announced that they would self-relegate due to lack of funds.)
10	Yuen Long (D, R)	0	0	0	0	0	0	0	0	Withdrew, record expunged Relegation to Hong Kong First Division League

Source: Hong Kong Football Association
Rules for classification: 1) Points; 2) Head-to-head points; 3) Head-to-head goal difference; 4) Head-to-head goals scored; 5) Goal difference; 6) Goals scored; 7) Fair-play points; 8) Drawing lots (Play-off if the winner has to be decided).
(D) Disqualified; (R) Relegated
Notes:

Win Draw Loss

=== Hong Kong Sapling Cup ===
==== Group stage ====
Pos	Team	Pld	W	D	L	GF	GA	GD	Pts	Qualification
1	Southern (A)	8	4	3	1	8	5	+3	15	Advance to Final
2	(China) R&F	8	4	1	3	18	12	+6	13	
3	Yuen Long	8	3	3	2	19	17	+2	12	
4	Happy Valley	8	2	2	4	13	17	−4	8	
5	Tai Po	8	1	3	4	18	25	−7	6	

Source: Hong Kong Football Association
Rules for classification: 1) Points; 2) Head-to-head points; 3) Head-to-head goal difference; 4) Goal difference; 5) Goals scored.
(A) Advance to a further round
