= 2019–20 Happy Valley AA season =

Happy Valley 2019–20 season
- President: Chen Zhishi
- Chairman: Pui Kwan Kay
- Manager: Pau Ka Yiu
- Stadium: Hammer Hill Road Sports Ground
- Premier League: 6th
- Senior Shield: First Round
- FA Cup: Quarter-finals
- Sapling Cup: Group Stage
- Highest home attendance: 1,026 (vs Kitchee, 19 October 2019)
- Lowest home attendance: 537 (vs Rangers, 24 November 2019)
| Home colours | Away colours |

The 2019–20 season is Happy Valley's 50th season in the top-tier division in Hong Kong football. Happy Valley will compete in the Premier League, Senior Challenge Shield, FA Cup and Sapling Cup this season.

== Squad ==
=== First Team ===
As of 18 September 2020

Note: Flags indicate national team as defined under FIFA eligibility rules; some limited exceptions apply. Players may hold more than one non-FIFA nationality.

| No. | Pos. | Nation | Player |
|---|---|---|---|
| 1 | GK | HKG | Chung Wai Ho |
| 2 | DF | HKG | Cheung Chun Hin |
| 3 | DF | HKG | Yung Hui To |
| 5 | DF | HKG | Yip Cheuk Man |
| 6 | DF | BRA | Luciano ^{FP} |
| 9 | MF | HKG | Wong Chi Hong |
| 11 | MF | HKG | Poon Pui Hin |
| 13 | MF | HKG | Jerry Lam |
| 15 | DF | HKG | Wong Ho Yin |
| 16 | MF | HKG | Lai Pui Kei |
| 17 | GK | HKG | To Chun Kiu |

| No. | Pos. | Nation | Player |
|---|---|---|---|
| 18 | DF | MAC | Lam Ngai Tong ^{LP} |
| 22 | GK | HKG | Ng Wai Him |
| 23 | DF | HKG | Siu Chi Ho |
| 26 | FW | HKG | Yuen Sai Kit |
| 27 | MF | HKG | Ng Ka Yeung |
| 28 | FW | HKG | Chu Wai Kwan |
| 30 | MF | HKG | Jahangir Khan |
| 31 | FW | HKG | So Dick On |
| 38 | MF | HKG | Henry Moore |
| 50 | DF | HKG | Tsang Chi Hau |
| – | MF | BRA | Mikael ^{FP} |

Remarks:
^{LP} These players are registered as local players in Hong Kong domestic football competitions.
^{FP} These players are registered as foreign players.

== Transfers ==
=== Transfers in ===
| Date from | Position | Nationality | Name | From | Fee | Ref. |
|---|---|---|---|---|---|---|
| 5 July 2019 | DF | (Hong Kong) | Yung Hui To | Chelsea Soccer School (Hong Kong) | Free | |
| 5 July 2019 | MF | (Hong Kong) | Lai Pui Kei | Chelsea Soccer School (Hong Kong) | Free | |
| 7 July 2019 | GK | (Hong Kong) | To Chun Kiu | Dreams FC | Free | |
| 10 July 2019 | MF | (Pakistan) | Jahangir Khan | Metro Gallery | End of loan | |
| 12 July 2019 | DF | (Macau) (Hong Kong) | Lam Ngai Tong | Tai Po | Free | |
| 14 July 2019 | DF | (Spain) | Edu Cruz | Free agent | Free | |
| 15 July 2019 | GK | (Hong Kong) | Ng Wai Him | Chelsea Soccer School (Hong Kong) | Free | |
| 15 July 2020 | MF | (Hong Kong) | Ng Ka Yeung | Chelsea Soccer School (Hong Kong) | Free | |
| 31 July 2020 | FW | (Spain) | Manuel Gavilán | (Spain) CD Toledo | Free | |
| 12 August 2019 | DF | (Brazil) | Luciano | Free agent | Free | |
| 29 August 2019 | FW | (Hong Kong) | Chu Wai Kwan | Dreams FC | Free | |
| 29 August 2019 | DF | (England) (Sweden) (Hong Kong) | Alexander Jojo | Free agent | Free | |
| August 2019 | DF | (Hong Kong) | Yip Cheuk Man | Chelsea Soccer School (Hong Kong) | Free | |
| August 2019 | DF | (Hong Kong) | Fung Tsz Hin | Chelsea Soccer School (Hong Kong) | Free | |
| August 2019 | MF | (Hong Kong) | Lam Lok Yin | Chelsea Soccer School (Hong Kong) | Free | |
| 17 January 2020 | FW | (Serbia) | Marko Rajković | (Montenegro) Akademija Pandev | Free | |
| 1 June 2020 | DF | (Hong Kong) | Tsang Chi Hau | Yuen Long | Free | |
| 3 June 2020 | MF | (Brazil) | Mikael | Yuen Long | Free | |
| 18 September 2020 | MF | (Hong Kong) | Henry Moore | Youth team | Free | |
| 18 September 2020 | FW | (Hong Kong) | So Dick On | Youth team | Free | |

=== Transfers out ===
| Date from | Position | Nationality | Name | To | Fee | Ref. |
|---|---|---|---|---|---|---|
| 1 July 2019 | DF | (Hong Kong) | Ma Man Chun | Sun Hei | Released | |
| 1 July 2019 | DF | (Hong Kong) | Wong King Wa | Double Flower | Released | |
| 1 July 2019 | DF | (Hong Kong) | Lee Chi Ho | King Fung | Released | |
| 1 July 2019 | MF | (Hong Kong) | Liu Yik Shing | Resources Capital | Released | |
| 1 July 2019 | FW | (Hong Kong) | Cheng Lai Hin | Double Flower | Released | |
| 1 July 2019 | FW | (Hong Kong) | Yeung Tsz Kit | North District | Released | |
| 1 July 2019 | FW | (Hong Kong) | Wong Sheung Choi | Double Flower | Released | |
| 1 July 2019 | FW | (Albania) | Ndue Mujeci | (Northern Cyprus) Cihangir GSK | Released | |
| 2 December 2019 | FW | (Hong Kong) | Chen Liming | | Released | |
| 22 January 2020 | DF | (Spain) | Edu Cruz | | Released | |
| 1 June 2020 | DF | (Serbia) | Igor Miović | | Released | |
| 1 June 2020 | MF | (Bosnia and Herzegovina) | Mahir Karić | | Released | |
| 1 June 2020 | FW | (Serbia) | Marko Rajković | | Released | |
| 1 June 2020 | FW | (Spain) | Manuel Gavilán | Kitchee | Released | |
| 30 June 2020 | MF | (Hong Kong) | Wong Wing Kit | | Released | |
| 1 July 2020 | DF | (England) (Sweden) (Hong Kong) | Alex Jojo | Eastern | Released | |

=== Loans in ===
| Start Date | End Date | Position | Nationality | Name | From Club | Fee | Ref. |
|---|---|---|---|---|---|---|---|
| 2 October 2019 | 19 January 2020 | FW | (Hong Kong) | Chiu Siu Wai | Tai Po | Undisclosed | |

=== Loans out ===
| Start Date | End Date | Position | Nationality | Name | To Club | Fee | Ref. |
|---|---|---|---|---|---|---|---|
| 11 January 2020 | End of season | DF | (Hong Kong) | Fung Tsz Hin | Chelsea Soccer School (Hong Kong) | Undisclosed | |

== Team staff ==
| Position | Staff |
|---|---|
| Director of football | (Hong Kong) Poon Man Tik |
| Head coach | (Hong Kong) Pau Ka Yiu |
| Assistant coach | (Hong Kong) Shum Kwok Pui |
| Assistant coach | (Hong Kong) Luk Koon Pong |
| Goalkeeping coach | (Hong Kong) Yan Kin Keung |

== Competitions ==
=== Hong Kong Premier League ===
==== Table ====
| Pos | Team | Pld | W | D | L | GF | GA | GD | Pts | Qualification or relegation |
|---|---|---|---|---|---|---|---|---|---|---|
| 4 | Lee Man | 10 | 5 | 1 | 4 | 16 | 14 | +2 | 16 | Qualification for AFC Cup group stage |
| 5 | Southern | 10 | 2 | 4 | 4 | 15 | 21 | −6 | 10 | |
| 6 | Happy Valley | 10 | 0 | 1 | 9 | 6 | 31 | −25 | 1 | |
| 7 | Pegasus (D) | 0 | 0 | 0 | 0 | 0 | 0 | 0 | 0 | Withdrew, record expunged (Note: Pegasus and Rangers withdrew from the league due to the 2020 coronavirus pandemic in Hong Kong, and their records were expunged.) |
| 8 | Rangers (D) | 0 | 0 | 0 | 0 | 0 | 0 | 0 | 0 | Withdrew, record expunged |

Source: Hong Kong Football Association
Rules for classification: 1) Points; 2) Head-to-head points; 3) Head-to-head goal difference; 4) Head-to-head goals scored; 5) Goal difference; 6) Goals scored; 7) Fair-play points; 8) Drawing lots (Play-off if the winner has to be decided).
(D) Disqualified
Notes:

Win Draw Loss

=== Hong Kong Sapling Cup ===
==== Group stage ====
| Pos | Team | Pld | W | D | L | GF | GA | GD | Pts | Qualification |
|---|---|---|---|---|---|---|---|---|---|---|
| 1 | Southern (A) | 8 | 4 | 3 | 1 | 8 | 5 | +3 | 15 | Advance to Final |
| 2 | (China) R&F | 8 | 4 | 1 | 3 | 18 | 12 | +6 | 13 | |
| 3 | Yuen Long | 8 | 3 | 3 | 2 | 19 | 17 | +2 | 12 | |
| 4 | Happy Valley | 8 | 2 | 2 | 4 | 13 | 17 | −4 | 8 | |
| 5 | Tai Po | 8 | 1 | 3 | 4 | 18 | 25 | −7 | 6 | |

Source: Hong Kong Football Association
Rules for classification: 1) Points; 2) Head-to-head points; 3) Head-to-head goal difference; 4) Goal difference; 5) Goals scored.
(A) Advance to a further round
