= 2019–20 Hong Kong Sapling Cup =

Football tournament season

Tournament details
- Country: Hong Kong; China
- Dates: 18 September 2019 – 27 September 2020
- Teams: 10

Final positions
- Champions: Kitchee (2nd title)
- Runners-up: Southern

Tournament statistics
- Matches played: 41
- Goals scored: 160 (3.9 per match)
- Top goal scorer(s): Manuel Gavilán (7 goals)

Awards
- Best player: Shinichi Chan
- All statistics correct as of 27 September 2020.

The 2019–20 Hong Kong Sapling Cup was the 5th edition of the Hong Kong Sapling Cup, and was the second time in history without name sponsorship. The Cup was contested by the 10 teams in the 2019–20 Hong Kong Premier League. The objective of the Cup was to create more potential playing opportunities for youth players. Each team were required to field a minimum of three players born on or after 1 January 1998 (U-22) and a maximum of six foreign players during every whole match, with no more than four foreign players on the pitch at the same time.

Lee Man were the defending champions, but were eliminated after failing to progress further from group stage. Kitchee became the champions for the second time after beating Southern in the final.

== Calendar ==
Phase	Round	Draw Date	Date	Matches	Clubs
Group stage	Matchday 1	11 September 2019	18, 24 September 2019; 23 October 2019; 6 November 2019	40	10 → 2
Group stage	Matchday 2	11 September 2019	22, 26–27 October 2019	40	10 → 2
Group stage	Matchday 3	11 September 2019	26–27, 29 October 2019; 11 January 2020	40	10 → 2
Group stage	Matchday 4	11 September 2019	5–6, 14–15 December 2019	40	10 → 2
Group stage	Matchday 5	11 September 2019	29 December 2019; 4 January 2020	40	10 → 2
Group stage	Matchday 6	11 September 2019	5 January 2020; 1, 3 February 2020	40	10 → 2
Group stage	Matchday 7	11 September 2019	2, 4, 22 February 2020	40	10 → 2
Group stage	Matchday 8	11 September 2019	22–23 February 2020; 3 March 2020	40	10 → 2
Group stage	Matchday 9	11 September 2019	7–8 March 2020	40	10 → 2
Group stage	Matchday 10	11 September 2019	10, 12 January 2020; 14–15 March 2020	40	10 → 2
Knockout phase	Final	11 September 2019	27 September 2020 at Tseung Kwan O Sports Ground	1	2 → 1

== Group stage ==
=== Group A ===
Pos	Team	Pld	W	D	L	GF	GA	GD	Pts	Qualification
1	Kitchee (A)	8	6	1	1	20	6	+14	19	Advance to Final
2	Eastern	8	5	1	2	14	5	+9	16	
3	Pegasus	8	4	0	4	19	20	−1	12	
4	Lee Man	8	2	1	5	17	22	−5	7	
5	Rangers	8	1	1	6	10	27	−17	4	

Source: Hong Kong Football Association
Rules for classification: 1) Points; 2) Head-to-head points; 3) Head-to-head goal difference; 4) Goal difference; 5) Goals scored.
(A) Advance to a further round
24 September 2019
20:00

Rangers	0–3 Awarded	Eastern
Bazán 20'	Report	Moser 6'

Mong Kok Stadium, Mong Kok
Attendance: 511
Referee: Wong Po Sing
23 October 2019
19:00

Kitchee	2–2	Lee Man
Wellingsson 30'; Buddle 47'	Report	N'dri 11'; Ngan Lok Fung 80'

Mong Kok Stadium, Mong Kok
Attendance: 627
Referee: Tang Hing Fu

26 October 2019
14:30

Rangers	1–2	Pegasus
Au Yeung Yiu Chung 38' (pen.)	Report	Méndez 45+2', 58'

Siu Sai Wan Sports Ground, Siu Sai Wan
Attendance: 448
Referee: Ng Chiu Kok
27 November 2019
20:00

Eastern	2–0	Lee Man
Diego 87'; Everton 90+3'	Report

Mong Kok Stadium, Mong Kok
Attendance: 382
Referee: Luk Kin Sun

27 October 2019
17:30

Eastern	2–1	Kitchee
Harima 32'; Eduardo 86'	Report	Barak 79'

Tsing Yi Sports Ground, Tsing Yi
Attendance: 721
Referee: Ho Wai Sing
29 October 2019
14:30

Lee Man	1–3	Pegasus
Jordi 43'	Report	Lazari 37'; Sasaki 60'; Lui Kit Ming 83'

Mong Kok Stadium, Mong Kok
Attendance: 430
Referee: Law Bik Chi

5 December 2019
19:00

Pegasus	1–4	Kitchee
Lee Oi Hin 4'	Report	Bleda 1', 60'; Fernando 84', 90+3'

Yuen Long Stadium, Yuen Long
Attendance: 306
Referee: Yu Kin Fung
15 December 2019
14:30

Lee Man	6–0	Rangers
Diogo 30'; N'dri 42'; Shapoval 60'; Gil 71'; Acosta 74'; Jordi 87'	Report

Sham Shui Po Sports Ground, Sham Shui Po
Attendance: 405
Referee: Tang Hing Fu

4 January 2020
14:30

Rangers	0–1	Kitchee
	Report	Wellingsson 11'

Tai Po Sports Ground, Tai Po
Attendance: 407
Referee: Woo Chun Sing
4 January 2020
17:30

Pegasus	2–1	Eastern
Sasaki 37'; Chang Hei Yin 88'	Report	Eduardo 18'

Mongkok Stadium, Mongkok
Attendance: 877
Referee: Tang Hing Fu

11 February 2020
13:00

Kitchee	3–0	Rangers
Cleiton 53'; Buddle 56'; Bleda 82'	Report

Jockey Club HKFA Football Training Centre No. 3, Tseung Kwan O
Attendance: 0
Referee: Wong Kei Hoi
18 February 2020
13:00

Pegasus	2–3	Lee Man
Chan Siu Ki 59'; Glassrock 80'	Report	N'dri 35', 45+2'; Jordi 90+2'

Jockey Club HKFA Football Training Centre No. 3, Tseung Kwan O
Attendance: 0
Referee: Liu Kwok Man

14 February 2020
16:00

Kitchee	1–0	Eastern
Fernando 89'	Report

Jockey Club HKFA Football Training Centre No. 2, Tseung Kwan O
Attendance: 0
Referee: Yu Kin Fung
14 February 2020
13:00

Pegasus	9–3	Rangers
Awal 14', 51'; Lee Oi Hin 60'; Chan Siu Ki 71', 73'; Sasaki 75'; Chan Wai Ho 79', 84'; Law Hiu Chung 90+1' (pen.)	Report	Pereira 20', 31'; Bazán 56'

Jockey Club HKFA Football Training Centre No. 3, Tseung Kwan O
Attendance: 0
Referee: Law Bik Chi

11 February 2020
16:00

Lee Man	1–3	Eastern
Jordi 58'	Report	Lucas 21', 82'; Everton 50'

Jockey Club HKFA Football Training Centre No. 2, Tseung Kwan O
Attendance: 0
Referee: Tam Ping Wun
23 February 2020
13:00

Kitchee	4–0	Pegasus
Wellingsson 61', 70'; Bleda 72'; Li Ngai Hoi 85'	Report

Jockey Club HKFA Football Training Centre No. 3, Tseung Kwan O
Attendance: 0
Referee: Ng Chiu Kok

25 February 2020
16:00

Rangers	6–3	Lee Man
Pereira 22', 36', 45'; Bazán 58', 62', 90+6'	Report	Acosta 41'; Cheng Siu Kwan 57'; Jordi 67'

Jockey Club HKFA Football Training Centre No. 2, Tseung Kwan O
Attendance: 0
Referee: Woo Chun Sing
28 February 2020
13:00

Eastern	3–0	Pegasus
Chen Hao-wei 1'; Chung Wai Keung 57', 67'	Report

Jockey Club HKFA Football Training Centre No. 3, Tseung Kwan O
Attendance: 0
Referee: Law Pik Chi

12 January 2020
14:30

Eastern	0–0	Rangers
	Report

Mong Kok Stadium, Mong Kok
Attendance: 759
Referee: Wong Kei Hoi
10 January 2020
20:00

Lee Man	1–4	Kitchee
Shapoval 72' (pen.)	Report	Fernando 4', 44'; Wellingsson 39'; Chan Shinichi 64'

Mong Kok Stadium, Mong Kok
Attendance: 783
Referee: Luk Kin Sun

=== Group B ===
Pos	Team	Pld	W	D	L	GF	GA	GD	Pts	Qualification
1	Southern (A)	8	4	3	1	8	5	+3	15	Advance to Final
2	(China) R&F	8	4	1	3	18	12	+6	13	
3	Yuen Long	8	3	3	2	19	17	+2	12	
4	Happy Valley	8	2	2	4	13	17	−4	8	
5	Tai Po	8	1	3	4	18	25	−7	6	

Source: Hong Kong Football Association
Rules for classification: 1) Points; 2) Head-to-head points; 3) Head-to-head goal difference; 4) Goal difference; 5) Goals scored.
(A) Advance to a further round
18 September 2019
20:00

R&F (China)	0–1	Southern
	Report	Chan Siu Kwan 23'

Mongkok Stadium, Mongkok
Attendance: 545
Referee: Wong Kei Hoi
6 November 2019
20:00

Happy Valley	0–3	Yuen Long
	Report	Fábio 20'; Wang Ruei 59'; Tang Tsz Kwan 84'

Mongkok Stadium, Mongkok
Attendance: 349
Referee: Luk Kin Sun

22 October 2019
20:00

Tai Po	3–5	(China) R&F
Sandro 11'; Dudu 34'; Kim Min-ki 45'	Report	Yuen Chun Sing 30'; Adriel Chan 50'; Emmersón 56', 80'; Déblé 90+1'

Mongkok Stadium, Mongkok
Attendance: 469
Referee: Lau Fong Hei
27 October 2019
14:30

Southern	1–0	Happy Valley
Major 13'	Report

Sham Shui Po Sports Ground, Sham Shui Po
Attendance: 583
Referee: Luk Kin Sun

26 October 2019
17:30

Yuen Long	2–2	(China) R&F
Mikael 55'; Kessi 88'	Report	Sean Tse 50'; Mak Fu Shing 89'

Siu Sai Wan Sports Ground, Siu Sai Wan
Attendance: 448
Referee: Tam Ping Wun
11 January 2020
14:30

Southern	1–0	Tai Po
Major 76'	Report

Mong Kok Stadium, Mong Kok
Attendance: 578
Referee: Woo Chun Sing

6 December 2019
20:00

Southern	0–0	Yuen Long
	Report

Siu Sai Wan Sports Ground, Siu Sai Wan
Attendance: 169
Referee: Tam Ping Wun
14 December 2019
14:30

Happy Valley	4–2	Tai Po
Gavilán 35', 78'; Chu Wai Kwan 37'; Van Meurs 72' (o.g.)	Report	Ho Chun Ting 8'; Kim Min-ki 53'

Siu Sai Wan Sports Ground, Siu Sai Wan
Attendance: 233
Referee: Woo Chun Sing

29 December 2019
14:30

Yuen Long	6–3	Tai Po
Mikael 4', 35'; Juninho 61'; Santana 67', 75', 79'	Report	Kim Min-ki 8'; Hui Ka Lok 81'; Chan Man Fai 87'

Yuen Long Stadium, Yuen Long
Attendance: 401
Referee: Law Pik Chi
29 December 2019
17:30

R&F (China)	0–1	Happy Valley
	Report	Luciano 90+3'

Mongkok Stadium, Mongkok
Attendance: 352
Referee: Wong Wai Lun

5 January 2020
14:30

Happy Valley	0–0	Southern
	Report

Hammer Hill Road Sports Ground, Diamond Hill
Attendance: 449
Referee: Wong Po Sing
5 January 2020
17:30

R&F (China)	5–1	Yuen Long
Giovane 26', 88'; Leung Nok Hang 41'; Mak Fu Shing 47'; Leonço 67'	Report	Bai He 90+2' (o.g.)

Mongkok Stadium, Mongkok
Attendance: 453
Referee: Law Pik Chi

12 February 2020
13:00

Tai Po	4–4	Happy Valley
Michael Luk 5', 90+2' (pen.); Ho Chun Ting 80'; Nakamura 85'	Report	Gavilán 15', 28', 36'; Luciano 70'

Jockey Club HKFA Football Training Centre No. 3, Tseung Kwan O
Attendance: 0
Referee: Wong Ka Ho
29 February 2020
13:00

Southern	1–2	(China) R&F
Dhiego 7' (pen.)	Report	Déblé 34', 72'

Jockey Club HKFA Football Training Centre No. 3, Tseung Kwan O
Attendance: 0
Referee: Ho Wai Sing

29 February 2020
16:00

Tai Po	2–2	Yuen Long
Juninho 40'; Lai Kak Yi 57'	Report	Mbome 71'; Kim Seung-yong 88' (pen.)

Jockey Club HKFA Football Training Centre No. 2, Tseung Kwan O
Attendance: 0
Referee: Wong Po Sing
19 February 2020
13:00

Happy Valley	1–3	(China) R&F
Gavilán 79'	Report	Sartori 37', 55'; Déblé 68'

Jockey Club HKFA Football Training Centre No. 3, Tseung Kwan O
Attendance: 0
Referee: Woo Chun Sing

16 February 2020
13:00

Tai Po	2–2	Southern
Sun Ming Him 9', 63'	Report	Major 28'; Rehman 86'

Jockey Club HKFA Football Training Centre No. 3, Tseung Kwan O
Attendance: 0
Referee: Poon Chun Kit
15 February 2020
16:00

Yuen Long	4–3	Happy Valley
Tang Tsz Kwan 15'; Santana 20'; Mikael 56', 87'	Report	Wong Chi Hong 25', 32'; Gavilán 45+1' (pen.)

Jockey Club HKFA Football Training Centre No. 2, Tseung Kwan O
Attendance: 0
Referee: Ho Wai Sing

12 February 2020
16:00

Yuen Long	1–2	Southern
Lai Kak Yi 57'	Report	Major 5'; Kawase 85'

Jockey Club HKFA Football Training Centre No. 2, Tseung Kwan O
Attendance: 0
Referee: Woo Chun Sing
25 February 2020
13:00

R&F (China)	1–2	Tai Po
Giovane 59'	Report	Kim Seung-yong 39' (pen.), 77'

Jockey Club HKFA Football Training Centre No. 3, Tseung Kwan O
Attendance: 0
Referee: Wong Wai Lun

== Final ==
The final took place on 27 September 2020 at Tseung Kwan O Sports Ground.

27 September 2020
15:00

Kitchee	3–1	Southern
Matt Orr 35' (pen.); Wellingsson 65'; Braunshtain 75'	Report	Beto 44'

Tseung Kwan O Sports Ground, Tseung Kwan O
Attendance: 0
Referee: Tam Ping Wun

== Top scorers ==
Rank	Player	Club	Goals
1	(Spain) Manuel Gavilán	Happy Valley	7
2	(Brazil) Wellingsson	Kitchee	6
3	(Brazil) Fernando	Kitchee	5
3	(Brazil) Mikael	Yuen Long	5
3	(Hong Kong) Jordi Tarrés	Lee Man	5
3	(Brazil) Stefan Pereira	Rangers	5
3	(Argentina) Leandro Bazán	Rangers	5
8	(Brazil) Maicon Santana	Yuen Long	4
8	(Australia) Travis Major	Southern	4
8	(France) Michaël N'dri	Lee Man	4
8	(Spain) Manolo Bleda	Kitchee	4
8	(Ivory Coast) Serges Déblé	R&F	4

== Remarks ==
1. Since Rangers violated Sapling Cup’s Competition Regulation Article 13 “A minimum of 3 local youth players (born in 1 January 1998 or after) must be fielded at any one time of a Sapling Cup match. A player being sent-off by referee (red card or two yellow cards) shall be deemed to be a player on the field.” The Disciplinary Committee of HKFA had resolved to declare a 0–3 victory for Eastern.
2. The previously scheduled football match, which was originally held at 8:00pm, will be rescheduled due to the request made by both teams.
3. The previously scheduled football matches in 2019-20 Sapling Cup – Hong Kong Pegasus vs Kitchee and Kwoon Chung Southern vs Best Union Yuen Long, which were originally held at 8pm on 6 December and 2:30pm on 7 December at Siu Sai Wan Sports Ground, will be rescheduled in order to accommodate the Hong Kong Representative Team to prepare for the EAFF E-1 Football Championship 2019 Final in Korea Republic.
4. The previously scheduled football matches in 2019-20 Sapling Cup were rescheduled due to public events and transportation arrangement, and requests of clubs earlier.
5. Further to the public health situation and temporary suspension of the venues of Leisure and Culture Services Department (LCSD), the matches of Sapling Cup will be rearranged. All matches held at Jockey Club HKFA Football Training Centre (FTC) will be played behind closed doors (Only authorized team players, staff, guests and media are allowed to enter).
6. Regarding the remaining matches of BOC Life Hong Kong Premier League, Sapling Cup Final, FA Cup Final and Senior Shield Final, Hong Kong Football Association (HKFA) has received official confirmation from Home Affairs Bureau today that 6 participated teams would be allowed to resume the remaining matches under required hygiene measures.
