= 2019–20 Hong Kong Pegasus FC season =

Pegasus 2019–20 season
- President: Steven Lo
- Chairman: Torres Chee
- Manager: Man Pei Tak
- Stadium: Hong Kong Stadium
- Premier League: Withdrew
- Senior Shield: Quarter-finals
- FA Cup: Semi-finals
- Sapling Cup: Group Stage
- Top goalscorer: League: Charles Lokolingoy (4 goals); All: Jean Moser (7 goals)
- Highest home attendance: 747 (vs Kitchee, 16 January 2020)
- Lowest home attendance: 363 (vs Yuen Long, 25 November 2019)
- Average home league attendance: 551
Home colours	Away colours

The 2019–20 season is Pegasus's 12th season in the top-tier division in Hong Kong football. Pegasus will compete in the Premier League, Senior Challenge Shield, FA Cup and Sapling Cup this season. However, due to the 2020 coronavirus pandemic in Hong Kong, Pegasus announced their withdrawal from the remaining matches this season in April 2020.

== Squad ==
=== First Team ===
As of 21 March 2020

Note: Flags indicate national team as defined under FIFA eligibility rules; some limited exceptions apply. Players may hold more than one non-FIFA nationality.

No.	Pos.	Nation	Player
1	GK	(Hong Kong) HKG	Leung Hing Kit
3	DF	(Hong Kong) HKG	Lui Man Tik
4	DF	(Australia) AUS	Michael Glassock ^{FP}
5	MF	(Hong Kong) HKG	Kwok Tsz Kaai
6	MF	(Hong Kong) HKG	Chan Hiu Fung
7	FW	(Hong Kong) HKG	Chan Siu Ki
8	FW	(Cameroon) CMR	Mahama Awal ^{FP}
9	FW	(Hong Kong) HKG	Lee Oi Hin
11	FW	(Japan) JPN	Shu Sasaki (captain) ^{FP}
12	MF	(Hong Kong) HKG	Siu Chun Ming
13	MF	(Hong Kong) HKG	Wong Chun Ho
14	FW	(Brazil) BRA	Jean Moser ^{FP} (on loan from Eastern)
15	DF	(Hong Kong) HKG	Chan Wai Ho

No.	Pos.	Nation	Player
16	DF	(Hong Kong) HKG	Law Hiu Chung
17	DF	(Hong Kong) HKG	Chan Pak Hang
18	MF	(Hong Kong) HKG	Chang Hei Yin
19	FW	(Hong Kong) HKG	Kiranbir Singh
21	DF	(Hong Kong) HKG	Cheung Chi Yung
22	DF	(Hong Kong) HKG	Yim Kai Wa
23	MF	(Hong Kong) HKG	Lui Kit Ming
24	GK	(Hong Kong) HKG	Law King Hei
25	MF	(Hong Kong) HKG	Yau Ka Wai
28	MF	(Hong Kong) HKG	Chiu Wan Chun
30	MF	(Brazil) BRA	David Lazari ^{FP}
77	DF	(Hong Kong) HKG	Tsang Kin Fong

Remarks:
^{LP} These players are registered as local players in Hong Kong domestic football competitions.
^{FP} These players are registered as foreign players.

== Transfers ==
=== Transfers in ===
Date from	Position	Nationality	Name	From	Fee	Ref.
16 July 2019	GK	(Hong Kong)	Law King Hei	Freemen FC	Free	
16 July 2019	DF	(Hong Kong)	Lui Man Tik	Dreams FC	Free	
16 July 2019	DF	(Australia)	Michael Glassock	(Australia) Central Coast Mariners U-21	Free	
16 July 2019	DF	(Hong Kong)	Chan Pak Hang	Yuen Long	Free	
16 July 2019	DF	(Hong Kong)	Yim Kai Wa	Yuen Long	Free	
16 July 2019	DF	(Hong Kong)	Tsang Kin Fong	(Sweden) Råslätts SK	Free	
16 July 2019	MF	(Hong Kong)	Kwok Tsz Kaai	Yuen Long	Free	
16 July 2019	MF	(Hong Kong)	Chan Hiu Fung	Tai Po	Free	
16 July 2019	MF	(Hong Kong)	Chiu Wan Chun	Youth team	Free	
16 July 2019	MF	(Spain)	Marcos Gondra	Dreams FC	Free	
16 July 2019	FW	(Spain)	Jorge Ortí	(Spain) CD Teruel	Free	
16 July 2019	FW	(Hong Kong)	Lee Oi Hin	Yuen Long	Free	
8 August 2019	FW	(Australia)	Charles Lokolingoy	(Australia) Sutherland Sharks	Free	
2 September 2019	DF	(Hong Kong)	Chan Wai Ho	Dreams FC	Free	
18 October 2019	MF	(Argentina)	Gabriel Méndez	(Ecuador) L.D.U. Portoviejo	Free	
18 October 2019	MF	(Hong Kong)	Yau Ka Wai	Leaper St. Joseph's	Free	
13 January 2020	FW	(Cameroon)	Mahama Awal	Free agent	Free	
February 2020	FW	(Hong Kong)	Kiranbir Singh	Icanfield	Free	

=== Transfers out ===
Date from	Position	Nationality	Name	To	Fee	Ref.
1 July 2019	GK	(Hong Kong)	Ng Chun Fat	Wong Tai Sin	Released	
1 July 2019	DF	(Hong Kong)	Cheung Kwok Ming	Shatin	Released	
1 July 2019	DF	(Hong Kong)	Siu Ka Ming	North District	Released	
1 July 2019	DF	(Hong Kong)	Jack Sealy	Southern	Released	
1 July 2019	DF	(Bulgaria)	Rosen Kolev	(Bulgaria) FC Dunav Ruse	Released	
1 July 2019	DF	(Hong Kong)	Tsang Chi Hau	Eastern	End of loan	
1 July 2019	FW	(Cameroon)	Mahama Awal		Released	
1 July 2019	MF	(Cameroon) (Hong Kong)	Eugene Mbome	Tai Po	Released	
1 July 2019	MF	(Hong Kong)	Wu Chun Ming	Eastern	Released	
1 July 2019	FW	(Hong Kong)	Yuen Chun Sing	Kitchee	Released	
1 July 2019	FW	(Australia)	Travis Major	Southern	Released	
1 July 2019	FW	(Hong Kong)	Paul Ngue		Released	
August 2019	MF	(Hong Kong)	Chow Wing Hin	Yau Tsim Mong	Released	
18 October 2019	FW	(Spain)	Jorge Ortí		Released	
6 November 2019	GK	(Hong Kong)	Zhang Chunhui		Released	
17 December 2019	MF	(Argentina)	Gabriel Méndez	Southern	Released	
22 December 2019	FW	(Australia)	Charles Lokolingoy	(Australia) Sydney Olympic FC	Released	
6 January 2020	MF	(Spain)	Marcos Gondra	(Spain) Gernika Club	Released	
8 April 2020	DF	(Australia)	Michael Glassock		Released	
8 April 2020	MF	(Brazil)	David Lazari		Released	
8 April 2020	FW	(Cameroon)	Mahama Awal		Released	
8 April 2020	FW	(Japan)	Shu Sasaki	Southern	Released	
April 2020	DF	(Hong Kong)	Chan Wai Ho	Retired	Released	
6 June 2020	FW	(Hong Kong)	Chan Siu Ki	Retired	Released	
1 July 2020	DF	(Hong Kong)	Cheung Chi Yung		Released	
1 July 2020	MF	(Hong Kong)	Wong Chun Ho	Lee Man	Released	
1 July 2020	MF	(Hong Kong)	Chang Hei Yin	Lee Man	Released	

=== Loans in ===
Start Date	End Date	Position	Nationality	Name	From Club	Fee	Ref.
26 July 2019	13 January 2020	MF	(Hong Kong)	Yiu Ho Ming	Eastern	Undisclosed	
2 January 2020	8 April 2020	FW	(Brazil)	Jean Moser	Eastern	Undisclosed	

=== Loans out ===
Start Date	End Date	Position	Nationality	Name	To Club	Fee	Ref.
26 July 2019	30 June 2020	FW	(Hong Kong)	Lau Chi Lok	Rangers	Undisclosed	
8 August 2019	30 June 2020	FW	(Brazil)	Juninho	Yuen Long	Undisclosed	

== Team staff ==
Position	Staff
Head coach	(Hong Kong) Man Pei Tak
Assistant coach	(Hong Kong) Chan Wai Ho
Assistant coach	(Hong Kong) Wong Tsz Fung
Assistant coach	(Hong Kong) Sin Ka Yu
Assistant coach	(Hong Kong) Chu Wai Lam
Team manager	(Hong Kong) Thomas Ng

== Competitions ==
=== Hong Kong Premier League ===
==== Table ====
Pos	Team	Pld	W	D	L	GF	GA	GD	Pts	Qualification or relegation
5	Southern	10	2	4	4	15	21	−6	10	
6	Happy Valley	10	0	1	9	6	31	−25	1	
7	Pegasus (D)	0	0	0	0	0	0	0	0	Withdrew, record expunged (Note: Pegasus and Rangers withdrew from the league due to the 2020 coronavirus pandemic in Hong Kong, and their records were expunged.)
8	Rangers (D)	0	0	0	0	0	0	0	0	Withdrew, record expunged
9	Tai Po (D, R)	0	0	0	0	0	0	0	0	Withdrew, record expunged Relegation to Hong Kong First Division League (Note: Tai Po and Yuen Long withdrew from the league due to the 2020 coronavirus pandemic in Hong Kong, and their records were expunged. On 12 June 2020, it was announced that they would self-relegate due to lack of funds.)

Source: Hong Kong Football Association
Rules for classification: 1) Points; 2) Head-to-head points; 3) Head-to-head goal difference; 4) Head-to-head goals scored; 5) Goal difference; 6) Goals scored; 7) Fair-play points; 8) Drawing lots (Play-off if the winner has to be decided).
(D) Disqualified; (R) Relegated
Notes:

Win Draw Loss

=== Hong Kong Sapling Cup ===
==== Group stage ====
Pos	Team	Pld	W	D	L	GF	GA	GD	Pts	Qualification
1	Kitchee (A)	8	6	1	1	20	6	+14	19	Advance to Final
2	Eastern	8	5	1	2	14	5	+9	16	
3	Pegasus	8	4	0	4	19	20	−1	12	
4	Lee Man	8	2	1	5	17	22	−5	7	
5	Rangers	8	1	1	6	10	27	−17	4	

Source: Hong Kong Football Association
Rules for classification: 1) Points; 2) Head-to-head points; 3) Head-to-head goal difference; 4) Goal difference; 5) Goals scored.
(A) Advance to a further round
