= 2016–17 Hong Kong Third Division League =

Hong Kong Third Division League
- Season: 2016–17
- Champions: Happy Valley
- Promoted: Happy Valley; Wing Go Fu Moon; GFC Friends; Fukien
- Relegated: Telecom; King Mountain
- Matches played: 182
- Goals scored: 695 (3.82 per match)

The 2016–17 Hong Kong Third Division League is the 3rd season of Hong Kong Third Division League since it became the fourth-tier football league in Hong Kong in 2014–15.

== Teams ==
=== Changes from last season ===
==== From Third Division ====
Promoted to Second Division

- Central & Western
- Hoi King

Eliminated from league

- HKFYG
- Kowloon Cricket Club

==== To Third Division ====
Relegated from Second Division

- Tsuen Wan
- Happy Valley

== League table ==
Pos	Team	Pld	W	D	L	GF	GA	GD	Pts	Promotion or relegation
1	Happy Valley (C, P)	26	21	4	1	90	14	+76	67	Promotion to Second Division
2	Wing Go Fu Moon (P)	26	21	2	3	85	21	+64	65	Promotion to Second Division
3	GFC Friends (P)	26	15	3	8	43	31	+12	48	Promotion to Second Division
4	Fukien (P)	26	13	6	7	45	25	+20	45	Promotion to Second Division
5	Golik North District	26	13	4	9	60	35	+25	43	
6	Ornament	26	10	8	8	38	45	−7	38 (Note: Ornament wins head-to-head against Leaper St. Joseph's and Islands)	
7	Islands	26	11	5	10	51	43	+8	38	
8	Leaper St. Joseph's	26	11	5	10	52	39	+13	38	
9	New Fair Kui Tan	26	11	4	11	57	46	+11	37	
10	KCDRSC	26	10	3	13	50	57	−7	33	
11	V Sports (W)	26	7	7	12	38	42	−4	28	Withdrew from League System
12	Tsuen Wan	26	5	4	17	37	51	−14	19	
13	Telecom (E)	26	4	4	18	40	67	−27	16	Elimination from League System
14	King Mountain (E)	26	0	1	25	9	179	−170	1	Elimination from League System

Updated to match(es) played on 14 May 2017. Source: Hong Kong Football Association
Rules for classification: 1) Points; 2) Head-to-head points; 3) Head-to-head goal difference; 4) Head-to-head goals scored; 5) Goal difference; 6) Goals scored; 7) Fair-play points; 8) Drawing lots
(C) Champions; (E) Eliminated; (P) Promoted; (W) Withdrew
