= Lai Pui Kei =

Hong Kong footballer

Personal information
- Full name: Lai Pui Kei
- Date of birth: 30 December 2001 (age 24)
- Place of birth: Hong Kong
- Height: 1.72 m (5 ft 8 in)
- Position: Attacking midfielder

Youth career
- 2016–2018: CFCSSHK

Senior career*
Years	Team	Apps	(Gls)
2018–2019	CFCSSHK	22	(12)
2019–2021	Happy Valley	19	(1)
2021–2023	HK U23	15	(0)
2023	Monte Carlo	2	(0)
2023–2024	Hong Kong Rangers	3	(0)
2024–2025	3 Sing	11	(1)
2025	Tuen Mun FC	8	(2)
2025–	Ravia		

International career
2015–2018	Hong Kong U-17	3	(1)
2018–2019	Hong Kong U-19	8	(1)
- * Club domestic league appearances and goals as of 16 May 2026

Lai Pui Kei (Chinese: 黎培基; born 30 December 2001) is a former Hong Kong professional footballer who played as an attacking midfielder.

== Club career ==
On 5 July 2019, Lai signed his first professional contract, agreeing to a deal with Hong Kong Premier League club Happy Valley.

In September 2021, Lai joined HK U23.

On 23 August 2023, Lai joined Rangers.

== Career statistics ==
=== Club ===
As of 13 March 2020.

Club	Season	League			FA Cup		Sapling Cup		Continental		Other		Total	
Club	Season	Division	Apps	Goals	Apps	Goals	Apps	Goals	Apps	Goals	Apps	Goals	Apps	Goals
CFCSSHK	2018–19	Hong Kong Third Division	22	12	0	0	0	0	–		0	0	22	12
Happy Valley	2019–20	Hong Kong Premier League	8	1	1	0	5	0	–		1 (Note: Appearances in the Hong Kong Senior Shield)	0	15	1
Career total			30	13	1	0	5	0	0	0	1	0	37	3

== Honours ==
=== Club ===
Rangers

- Hong Kong Sapling Cup: 2023–24
