= Felix Luk =

Hong Kong footballer (born 1994)

Felix Luk 陸平中
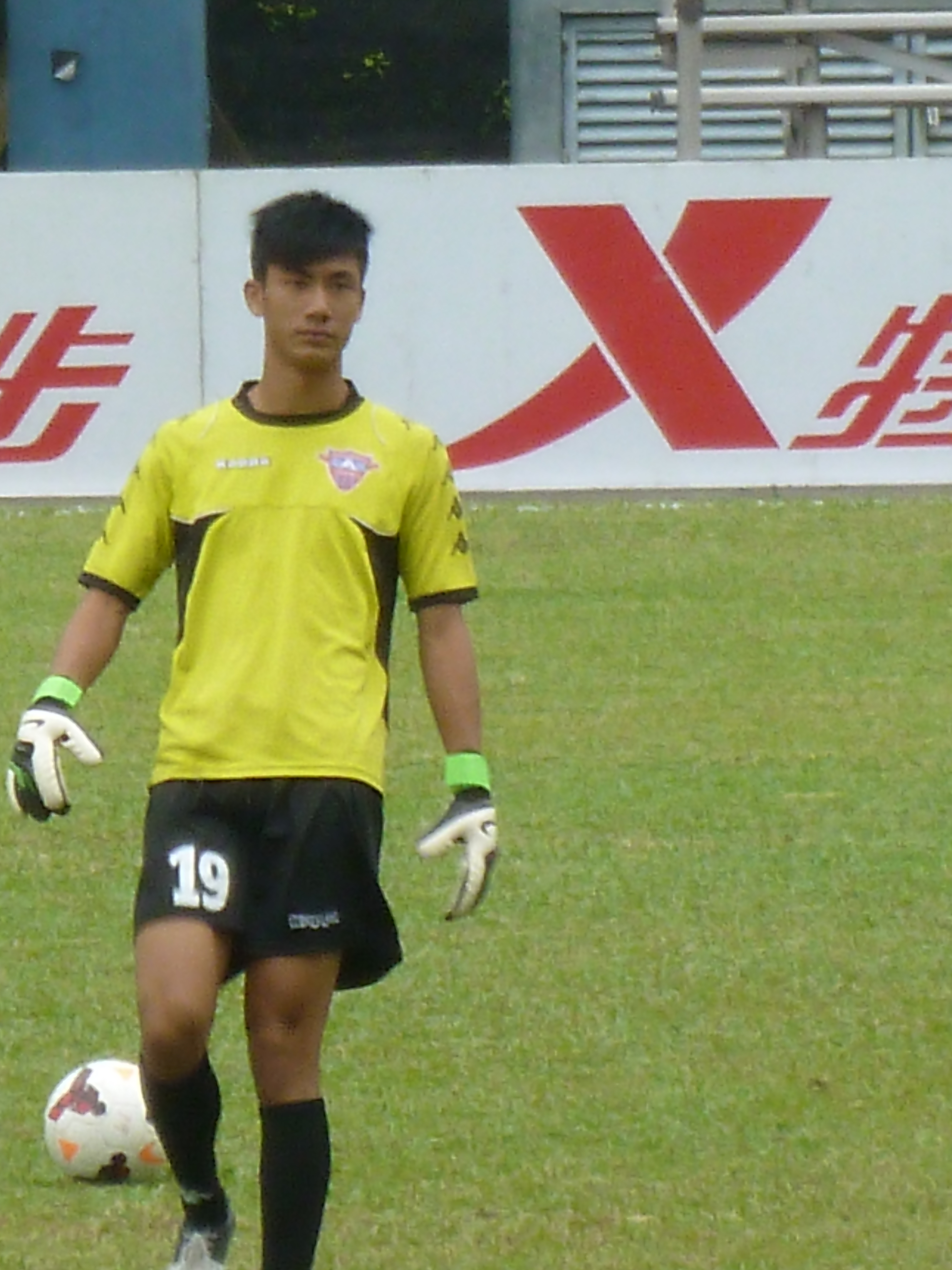

Personal information
- Full name: Felix Luk Ping Chung
- Date of birth: 7 May 1994 (age 32)
- Place of birth: Hong Kong
- Height: 1.91 m (6 ft 3 in)
- Position: Goalkeeper

Youth career
- 2007–2008: Eastern
- 2008–2009: Rangers (HKG)

Senior career*
Years	Team	Apps	(Gls)
2010–2014	Tuen Mun	2	(0)
2014–2016	Yuen Long	3	(0)
2016–2017	Rangers (HKG)	8	(0)
2017–2018	Lee Man	18	(0)
2018–2019	Hoi King	9	(0)
2019–2020	Tai Po	7	(0)
2020–2021	Pegasus	1	(0)
2021–2024	South China	32	(0)
2024–2025	Kowloon City	9	(0)
2024–2025	Sham Shui Po	16	(0)

International career
2013	Hong Kong U-19	1	(0)
- * Club domestic league appearances and goals as of 16 May 2026

Felix Luk Ping Chung (Chinese: 陸平中; born 7 May 1994) is a Hong Kong former professional footballer who plays as a goalkeeper.

== Early career ==
As a youngster, Luk participated in annual summer soccer camps in Hong Kong, sponsored by McDonald's. He initially played as a forward but because his technical ability was poor, he later switched to goalkeeper.

While growing up in Tuen Mun, Luk joined a youth football program run by the father of Tsun Dai. During this time, he was coached by former South China star Shum Kwok Pui. Following Eastern's promotion to the 2007–08 Hong Kong First Division, the club absorbed the program under their academy system and Luk trained as an Eastern youth player for the season. At the conclusion of the season, Luk left to join Rangers' academy for a season.

== Club career ==
In 2010–11, Tuen Mun was promoted to the Hong Kong First Division and offered Luk a professional contract. Because Luk was 16 at the time, he needed his parents to co-sign the contract and as well, he was restricted to only one training session a week with the club. Despite beginning the season as Tuen Mun's third choice keeper, Luk earned his first start on 23 April 2011 in a 2–1 loss to Sun Hei.

During the 2013–14 season, Tuen Mun was expelled from the league halfway through the season, leading to the cancellation of Luk's contract. The following summer, Luk signed with Yuen Long after being lured by the opportunity to work with head coach Fung Hoi Man.

Upon Fung's departure to Rangers ahead of the 2016–17 season, Luk followed him. He won the starting job midway through the season when first choice keeper Chiu Yu Ming suddenly quit the club in order to become a C&ED officer.

Ahead of the 2017–18 season, Lee & Man decided to withdraw their sponsorship of Rangers in order to form their own club in the Hong Kong Premier League. Both Luk and Fung decided to join Lee Man. For the first time in his career, Luk became the first choice keeper for his club and started all 18 league matches for Lee Man.

On 24 July 2018, following a preseason friendly, Hoi King confirmed that they had signed Luk. This marked the third time Luk had followed Fung to a new club, the fourth time he has played for him, and the first time Luk had done so for a club which was owned by Fung.

On 29 July 2019, Tai Po revealed that Luk would join the club.

On 20 October 2020, Luk was named as one of 17 new players for Pegasus.

After a brief period with Pegasus, Luk joined Hong Kong First Division League club South China in 2021.

In January 2024, Luk joined Kowloon City.

== Personal life ==
Luk retired from professional football in 2021 and is now a high school teacher.
