= Chu Wai Kwan =

Hong Kong footballer

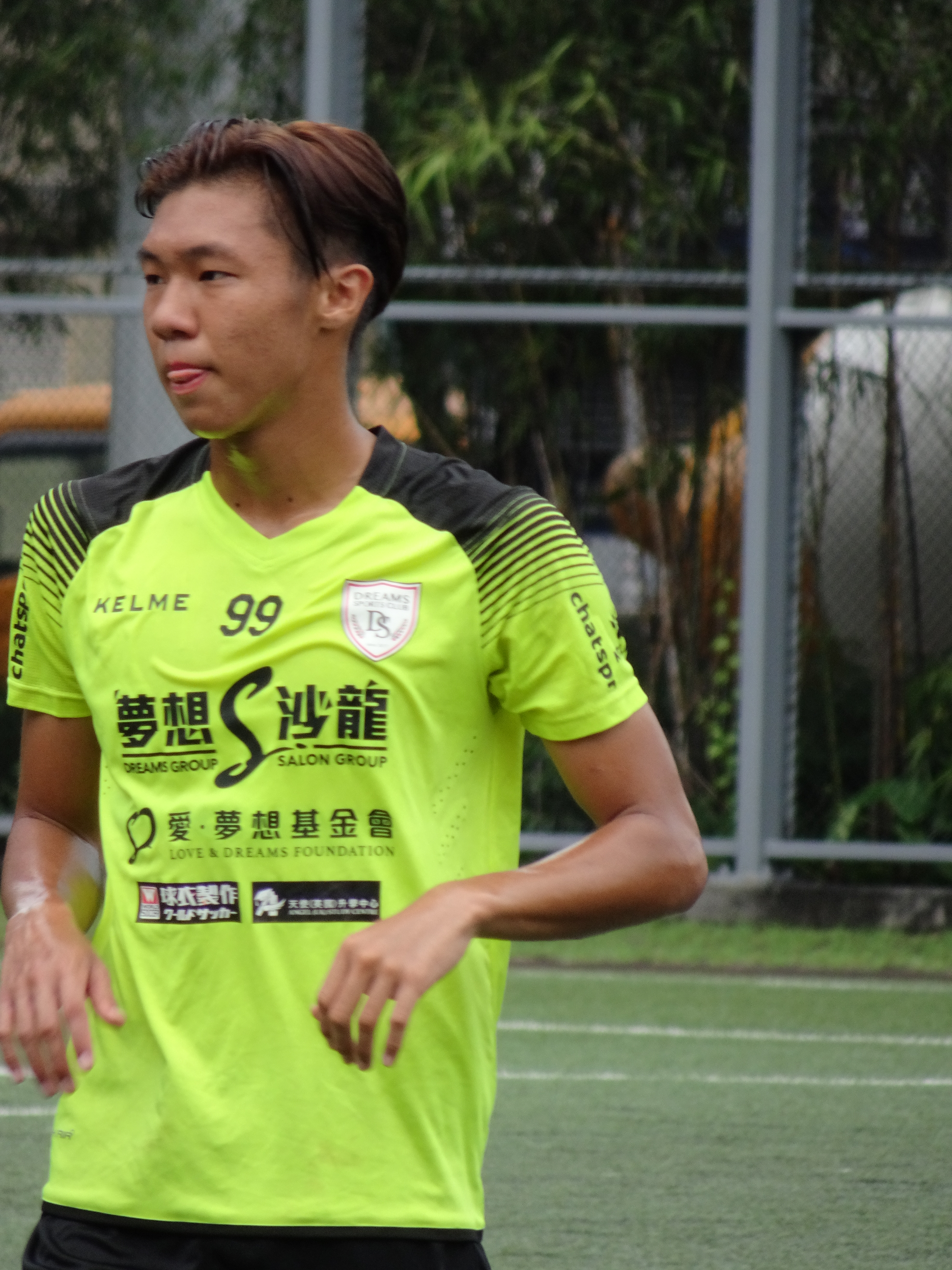

Personal information
- Full name: Chu Wai Kwan
- Date of birth: 9 February 1999 (age 27)
- Place of birth: Hong Kong
- Height: 1.88 m (6 ft 2 in)
- Positions: Forward; attacking midfielder

Youth career
- 2013–2014: Hong Kong Rangers
- 2014–2016: CFCSSHK

Senior career*
| Years | Team | Apps | (Gls) |
| 2016–2017 | Happy Valley | 26 | (12) |
| 2017–2019 | Dreams FC | 12 | (0) |
| 2019–2021 | Happy Valley | 26 | (4) |
| 2021–2023 | Eastern | 5 | (0) |
| 2023 | → Sham Shui Po (loan) | 9 | (1) |
| 2023–2024 | North District | 27 | (1) |
| 2025 | Man Fung Hong | | |
| 2025– | Kui Tan | 22 | (21) |

International career^{‡}
| 2016–2017 | Hong Kong U19 | 5 | (4) |
| 2021 | Hong Kong U22 | 1 | (0) |
- * Club domestic league appearances and goals as of 31 May 2026 ‡ National team caps and goals as of 23 October 2021

Chu Wai Kwan (Chinese: 朱偉鈞; born 9 February 1999) is a Hong Kong former professional footballer who played as a forward.

== Youth career ==
Chu trained as a member of the Rangers academy while attending Yan Chai Hospital Tung Chi Ying Memorial Secondary School. He later moved to Chelsea Soccer School with whom he won the HKFA Youth Cup in the 2015–16 season. Although he was invited by both Metro Gallery and South China to train with their respective first teams, he declined to do so until he finished high school.

== Club career ==
Due to Chelsea Soccer School's partnership agreement with Happy Valley, Chu was registered as a Happy Valley player for the 2016–17 season. He scored 12 goals and helped the club win the Third Division title.

In July 2017, Chu signed with top-flight club Dreams FC. He made his debut on 26 August 2017, playing 12 minutes in a 1–1 draw against Tai Po.

In August 2019, Chu signed with Happy Valley again following the self-relegation of Dreams FC.

On 9 August 2021, it was announced that Chu had signed with Eastern.

On 27 January 2023, Chu was loaned to Sham Shui Po for the rest of the season.

On 22 July 2023, Chu joined North District.

== Honours ==
=== Club ===
Happy Valley

- Hong Kong Third Division: 2016–17
