= Pang Chiu Yin =

Hong Kong footballer

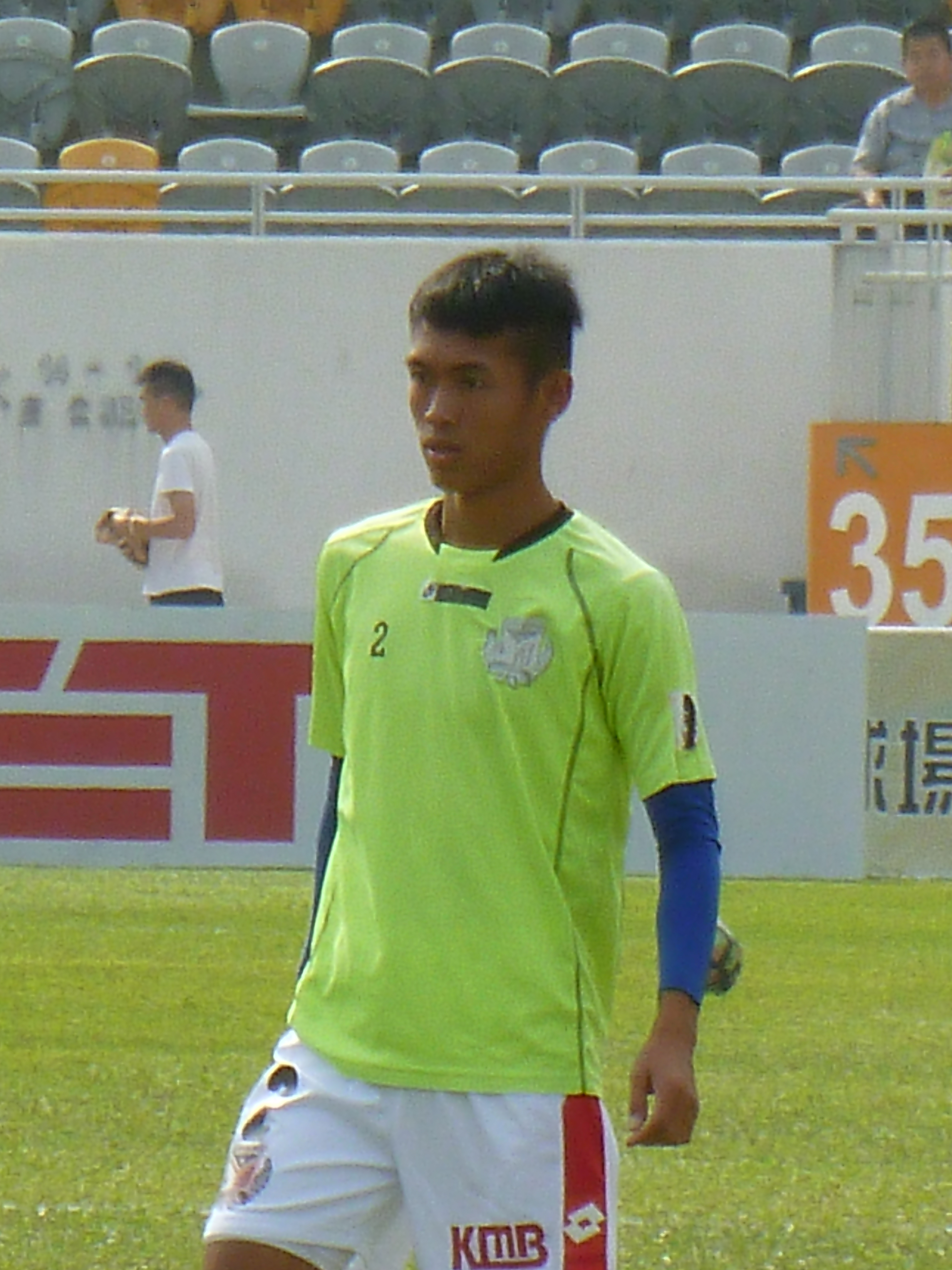

Personal information
- Full name: Pang Chiu Yin
- Date of birth: 12 October 1995 (age 31)
- Place of birth: Hong Kong
- Height: 1.70 m (5 ft 7 in)
- Position: Midfielder

Youth career
- 2007–2012: Yuen Long
- 2012–2013: Pegasus
- 2013–2014: Tuen Mun

Senior career*
Years	Team	Apps	(Gls)
2014	Tai Chung	11	(0)
2014–2015	Happy Valley	11	(3)
2015	Kwok Keung		
2015–2016	Happy Valley	12	(5)
2016–2018	Yuen Long	7	(0)
2018–2019	Dreams FC	9	(1)
2019–2020	Yuen Long	4	(0)
2020–2021	Tai Po	11	(2)
2021–2022	Kowloon City	11	(2)
2022–2023	Happy Valley	22	(4)
2023–2025	Citizen AA	22	(6)
2025–2026	Sui Tung	12	(2)
2026–	Fu Moon	3	(1)
- * Club domestic league appearances and goals as of 17 May 2026

Pang Chiu Yin (Chinese: 彭超然; born 12 October 1995) is a former Hong Kong professional footballer who played as a midfielder.

Before becoming a footballer, he worked as an airport security guard.

== Club career ==
Yuen Long revealed that they had signed Pang on 10 August 2019. He announced on 29 May 2020, that as a result of the club's financial struggles, he would leave after his contract expired.

== Honours ==
=== Club ===
Yuen Long

- Hong Kong Senior Shield: 2017–18
