= Philip To =

Hong Kong footballer

Personal information
- Full name: Philip Michael To
- Date of birth: 20 December 1990 (age 35)
- Place of birth: Hong Kong
- Height: 1.78 m (5 ft 10 in)
- Position: Centre back

Team information
- Current team: Sha Tin
- Number: 24

Senior career*
Years	Team	Apps	(Gls)
2009–2013	Southern	33	(1)
2013–2014	Happy Valley	0	(0)
2014–2015	Southern	23	(4)
2015–2016	Yuen Long	2	(0)
2016–2017	Rangers (HKG)	0	(0)
2017–2019	Hoi King	40	(1)
2019–2020	Tai Po	2	(0)
2020–2022	Tung Sing	12	(1)
2022–2025	Citizen	40	(1)
2025–2026	Supreme	14	(0)
2026–	Sha Tin	0	(0)
- * Club domestic league appearances and goals as of 17 May 2026

Philip Michael To (Chinese: 杜瑋鴻; born 20 December 1990) is a Hong Kong professional footballer who currently plays as a centre back for Hong Kong Premier League club Sha Tin.

== Club career ==
On 6 August 2019, To joined Tai Po.

In October 2026, To returned to the top flight and joined Sha Tin.
