= Wong Chun Hin (footballer, born 1999) =

Hong Kong footballer

Personal information
- Full name: Hinson Wong Chun Hin
- Date of birth: 21 March 1999 (age 27)
- Place of birth: Hong Kong
- Height: 1.74 m (5 ft 9 in)
- Positions: Midfielder; right back

Youth career
- 2011–2017: Yuen Long

Senior career*
Years	Team	Apps	(Gls)
2017–2018	Yuen Long	1	(0)
2018–2019	Dreams FC	3	(0)
2019–2020	Yuen Long	4	(0)
2020–2022	Rangers (HKG)	8	(0)
2022–2026	Yuen Long	76	(8)
2026–	Supreme	1	(0)
- * Club domestic league appearances and goals as of 17 May 2026

Hinson Wong Chun Hin (Chinese: 黃晉軒; born 21 March 1999) is a former Hong Kong professional footballer who played as a midfielder.

== Club career ==
=== Rangers ===
On 10 September 2020, Rangers' Director of Football Philip Lee declared that Wong would join the club.

Wong left the club in 2022.

== Honours ==
=== Club ===
Yuen Long

- Senior Shield: 2017–18
