= Jockey Club HKFA Football Training Centre =

Football training centre in Hong Kong

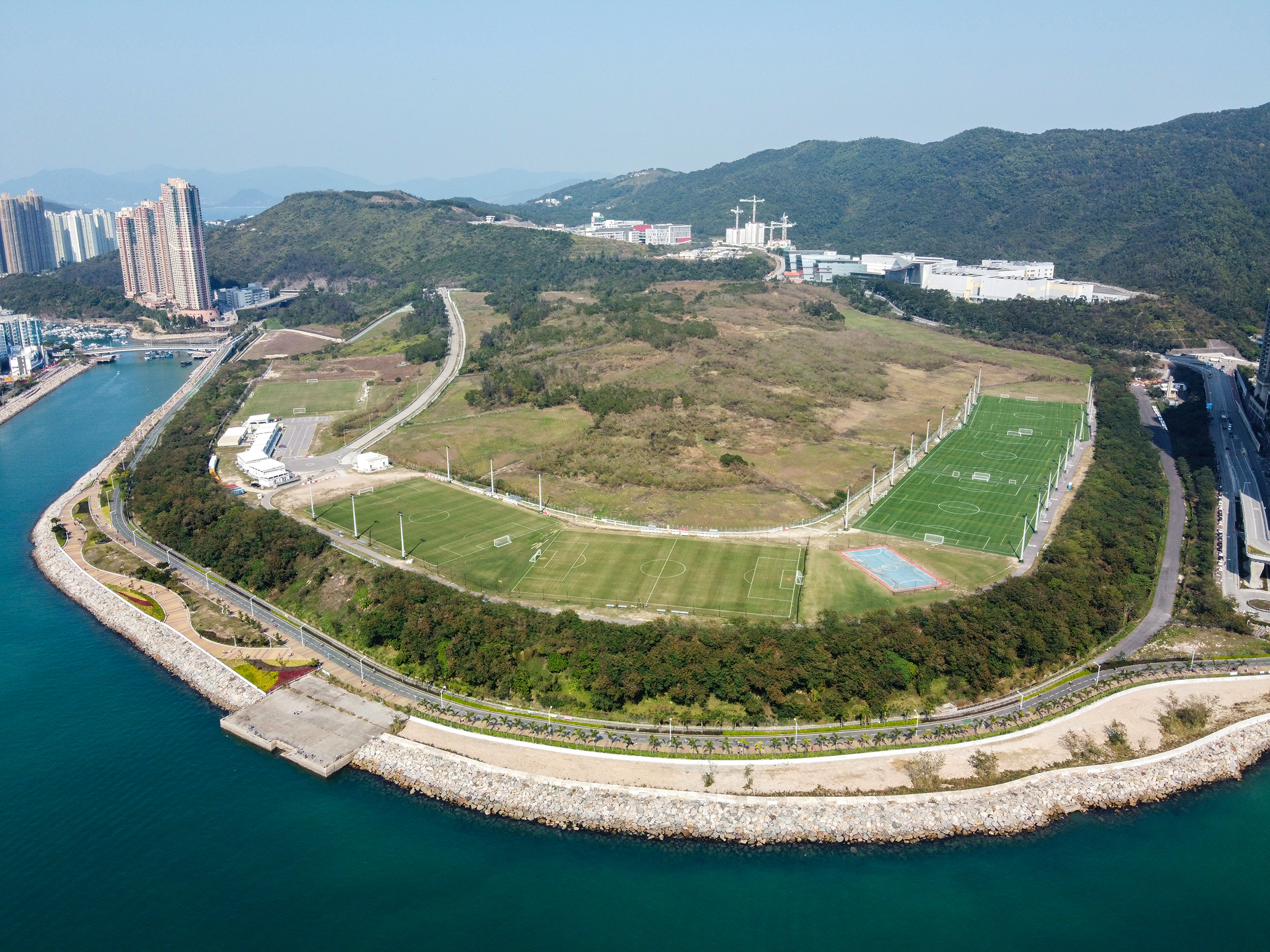
- Established: 2018
- Budget: $133 million HKD
- Address: 190 Wan Po Road, Tseung Kwan O, Hong Kong
- Location: Tseung Kwan O, New Territories, Hong Kong
- Coordinates: 22°17′53″N 114°16′05″E
- Website: Official site

Jockey Club HKFA Football Training Centre (Abbreviated as FTC, Chinese: 賽馬會香港足球總會足球訓練中心) is a football training centre in Tseung Kwan O, New Territories, Hong Kong which was completed in September 2018.

== History ==
In 2002, the Hong Kong Football Association announced a plan to build a National Football Training Centre at a closed landfill in Tseung Kwan O. It was going to be the first of its kind in Hong Kong and expected to be completed by 2008 with a $103-million grant from the Hong Kong Jockey Club. But it never got off the ground.

In 2012, under new Chief Executive Officer Mark Sutcliffe and Project Phoenix, the HKFA have recognized the importance of the centre and it is discussing sponsorship with the Hong Kong Jockey Club to finance the centre's construction. The HKFA will work with the Government and the Hong Kong Jockey Club to develop the business plan and site master plan for this much needed facility. Mark Sutcliffe hopes that the work done in 2013 will enable a start on construction in early 2014.

On 17 November 2015, Mark Sutcliffe said HK$133 million in funding from the Hong Kong Jockey Club has been agreed for the construction, which is due to start in 2016. A consultant company will be appointed to oversee the construction project which will see three natural turf pitches and three artificial turf pitches to be built on the former landfill. The government has also released the land which was previously held under the Restored Landfill Revitalisation Funding Scheme.

On 15 December 2016, HKFA CEO Mark Sutcliffe announced to the media that initial work for construction of facility has recently started and should be ready in July 2017.

Local contractor Projexasia was awarded the construction contract in late 2016.

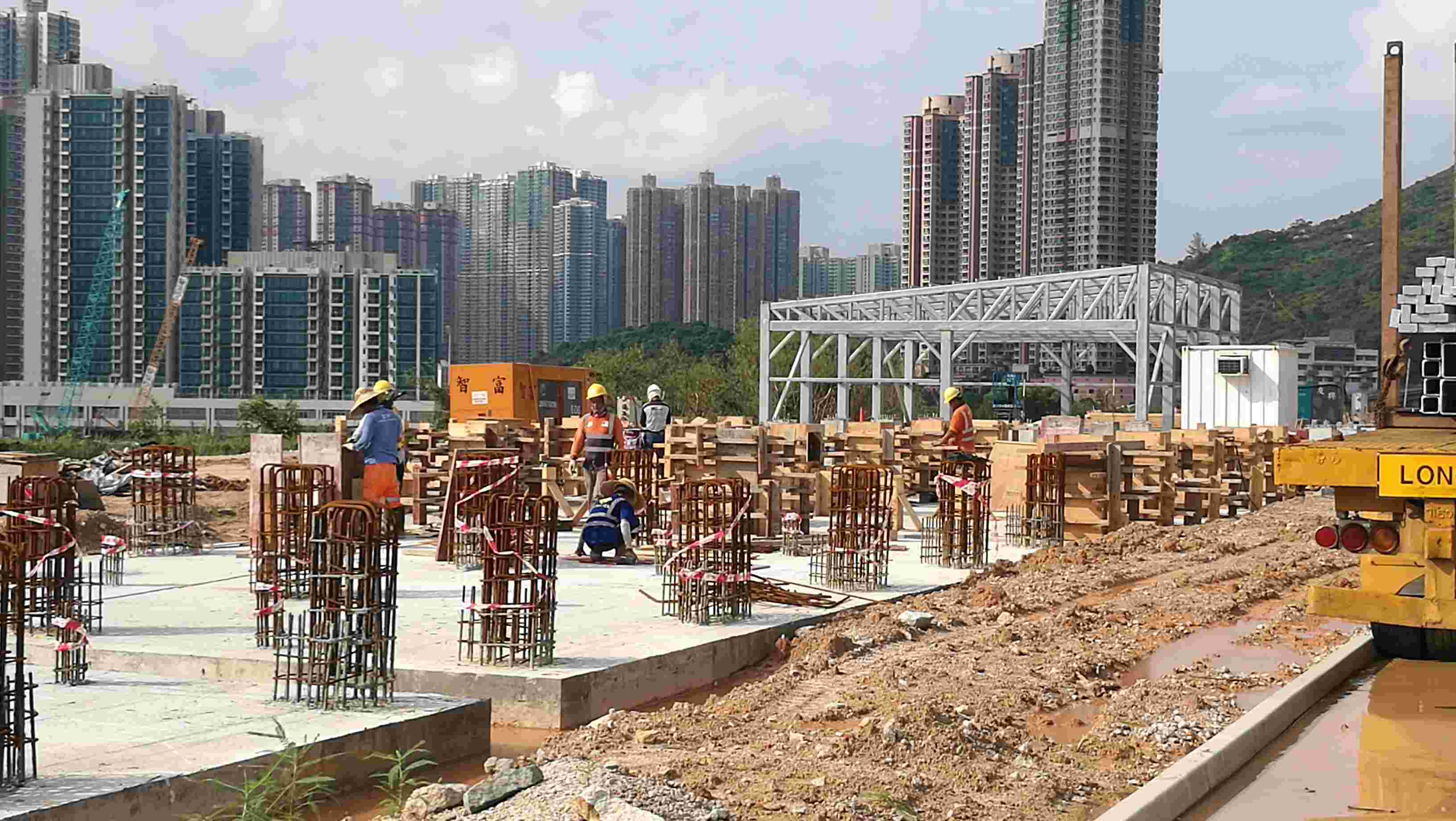
The landmark training centre, under construction

== Facilities ==
The centre contains three natural grass and artificial turf pitches each with additional futsal facilities, administrative offices, classrooms, gymnasiums and changing rooms. The FTC is the main training ground for Hong Kong's men's and women's national teams as well as its youth teams. When not in use for the national team, the facilities are available for booking by the public.

== External websites ==
- Jockey Club HKFA Football Training Centre (HKFA)
