= Željko Kuzmić =

Serbian footballer

Personal information
- Date of birth: 2 November 1984 (age 42)
- Place of birth: Aranđelovac, SFR Yugoslavia
- Height: 1.94 m (6 ft 4 in)
- Position: Goalkeeper

Senior career*
Years	Team	Apps	(Gls)
1999–2005	Železnik	0	(0)
2003	→ Dubočica (loan)	10	(0)
2003–2004	→ Sremčica (loan)	29	
2005–2006	Mornar	10	(0)
2006–2007	Kania Gostyń		
2007–2008	Proleter Teslić	10	(0)
2008	Pobeda	8	(0)
2009–2010	Smederevo	7	(0)
2010–2011	Saint George	18	(0)
2011	Železničar Lajkovac	6	(0)
2012	Velež Mostar	1	(0)
2013	Himarë	8	(0)
2013	Mladost Podgorica	9	(0)
2014	Karađorđe Topola	18	(0)
2015	Berane		
2015	Rudar Prijedor	6	(0)
2016	Travnik	1	(0)
2016	Nybro IF	3	(0)
2016–2017	Metalleghe-BSI	1	(0)
2017–2018	Radnički Svilajnac	19	(0)
2018	SV Donaustauf	4	(0)
2019	Proleter Mihajlovac		
2019	Deren	20	(0)
2020	Tai Po		
2020	Ama Brenta Calcio Ceva		
2022	ATSV Stadl-Paura	14	(0)
2022	Radnički Kragujevac		
2023	Club Sol de Mayo	1	(0)
2023	Radnički Obrenovac		
2024	Atlético Vega Real	3	(0)
2024	FK Šumadija Aranđelovac	6	(0)
2025	ФК ПКБ		
- * Club domestic league appearances and goals

Željko Kuzmić (Serbian Cyrillic: Жељко Кузмић; born 2 November 1984) is a Serbian professional football goalkeeper. Kuzmić has played football in Europe, Asia, Africa, South America and the Caribbean.

== Career ==
He had previously played for the Serbian Superliga club FK Smederevo along with the clubs Saint-George SA in Ethiopia and FK Velež Mostar in Premier League of Bosnia and Herzegovina. He also played for Bosnian sides Rudar Prijedor, Travnik and Metalleghe-BSI

On 14 January 2020, Kuzmić signed with Hong Kong club Tai Po for a half year, with an option to extend for a further year. In February 2023 he joined Argentinian side Sol de Mayo.

He played 3 games in the Dominican league in 2024.

== See also ==
- Journeyman (sports)
