= Kim Min-ki (footballer) =

Korean association football player

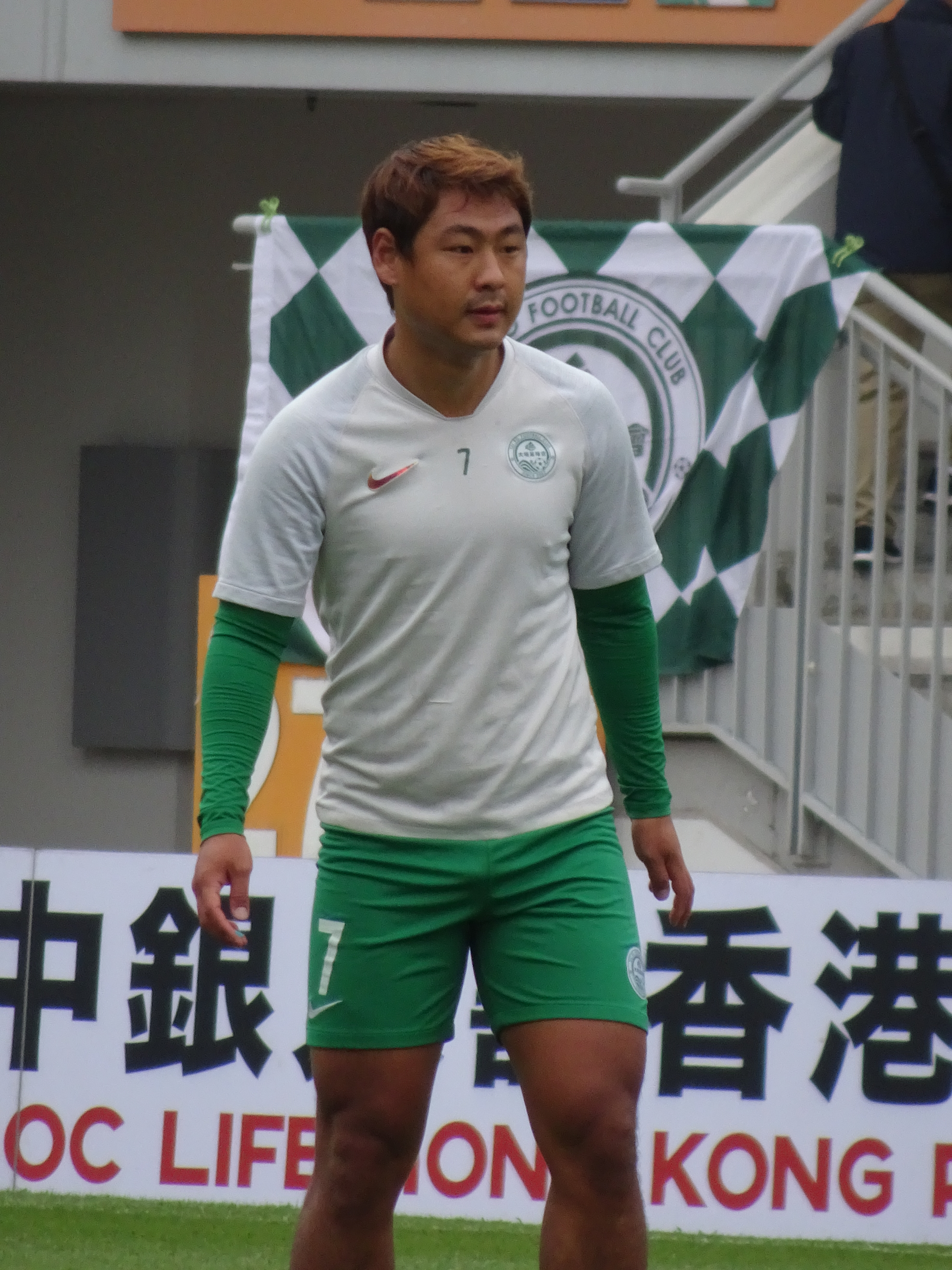

Personal information
- Full name: Kim Min-ki
- Date of birth: 21 June 1990 (age 36)
- Place of birth: Suwon, Gyeonggi, South Korea
- Height: 1.82 m (5 ft 11 1/2 in)
- Position: Forward

Youth career
- 1998–2008: Ulsan Hyundai
- 2006–2007: → Palmeiras (KFA Youth Project)
- 2007–2008: Seogwipo High School
- 2008–2012: Konkuk University

Senior career*
Years	Team	Apps	(Gls)
2012–2014	Ulsan Dolphin	21	(3)
2014–2015	Suwon FC	5	(0)
2015	Yangju Citizen	?	(?)
2015–2016	Paju Citizen	?	(?)
2016–2017	Pyeongtaek Citizen	?	(?)
2019	Hoi King	13	(5)
2019–2020	Tai Po	24	(8)

International career
2006–2007	South Korea U-17	?	(?)
- * Club domestic league appearances and goals as of 18 January 2020

- Kim Min-ki
- Hangul: 김민기
- Hanja: 金玟基
- RR: Gim Mingi
- MR: Kim Min'gi

Kim Min-ki (Korean: 김민기; born 21 June 1990) is a South Korean footballer who plays as a forward and is currently a free agent.

== Early years ==
In 2006, 16-year-old Kim was selected into the Korea Football Association's Youth Project. The project sent promising youngsters to receive training abroad, and would eventually produce superstars like Son Heung-min.

Through this program, Kim trained at Série A club Palmeiras for a season. While in Brazil, in aim of achieving success there, Kim learnt to speak fluent Portuguese.

== Career statistics ==
=== Club ===
As of 8 March 2019.

Club	Season	League			National Cup		League Cup		Continental		Other		Total	
Club	Season	Division	Apps	Goals	Apps	Goals	Apps	Goals	Apps	Goals	Apps	Goals	Apps	Goals
Ulsan Dolphin	2013	Korea National League	21	3	0	0	0	0	–		0	0	21	3
Suwon FC	2014	K League Challenge	4	0	1 (Note: Appearances in the Korean FA Cup)	0	0	0	–		0	0	5	0
Hoi King	2018–19	Hong Kong Premier League	7	1	1 (Note: Appearances in the Hong Kong FA Cup)	0	2 (Note: Appearances in the Sapling Cup)	2	–		0	0	10	3
Career total			32	3	2	0	2	2	0	0	0	0	36	5
