= Lui Kit Ming =

Hong Kong footballer

Personal information
- Full name: Lui Kit Ming
- Date of birth: 14 June 2000 (age 26)
- Place of birth: Hong Kong
- Height: 1.74 m (5 ft 9 in)
- Position: Defensive midfielder

Youth career
- Islands
- Chelsea Soccer School (Hong Kong)
- Hoi King
- 2017–2018: Pegasus

Senior career*
Years	Team	Apps	(Gls)
2018–2020	Pegasus	4	(0)
2020–2021	Shatin	1	(0)
2021–2022	South China	2	(0)
- * Club domestic league appearances and goals

Lui Kit Ming (Chinese: 雷傑名; born 14 June 2000) is a former Hong Kong professional footballer who played as a midfielder.
