= Kwok Tsz Kaai =

Hong Kong footballer

Personal information
- Full name: Kwok Tsz Kaai
- Date of birth: 26 December 1996 (age 29)
- Place of birth: Hong Kong
- Height: 1.76 m (5 ft 9 in)
- Position: Midfielder

Team information
- Current team: Eastern District
- Number: 16

Youth career
- 2011–2014: Brooke House College
- 2014: Hellerup IK
- 2014–2015: Aberystwyth Town

Senior career*
Years	Team	Apps	(Gls)
2015–2016	Rangers (HKG)	2	(0)
2016–2017	Biu Chun Glory Sky	10	(0)
2017	Rangers (HKG)	1	(0)
2018–2019	Yuen Long	9	(0)
2019–2021	Pegasus	6	(0)
2021–2024	HK U23	34	(0)
2024–	Eastern District	48	(4)

International career
2016	Hong Kong U19	2	(0)
- * Club domestic league appearances and goals as of 8 November 2026

Kwok Tsz Kaai (Chinese: 郭子堦; born 26 December 1996) is a Hong Kong professional footballer who currently plays as a midfielder for Hong Kong Premier League club Eastern District.

== Club career ==
In July 2019, Kwok joined Pegasus.

On 2 September 2021, Kwok joined HK U23.

In September 2024, Kwok joined Eastern District.
