= Benjamin Van Meurs =

Australian soccer player

Benjamin van Meurs
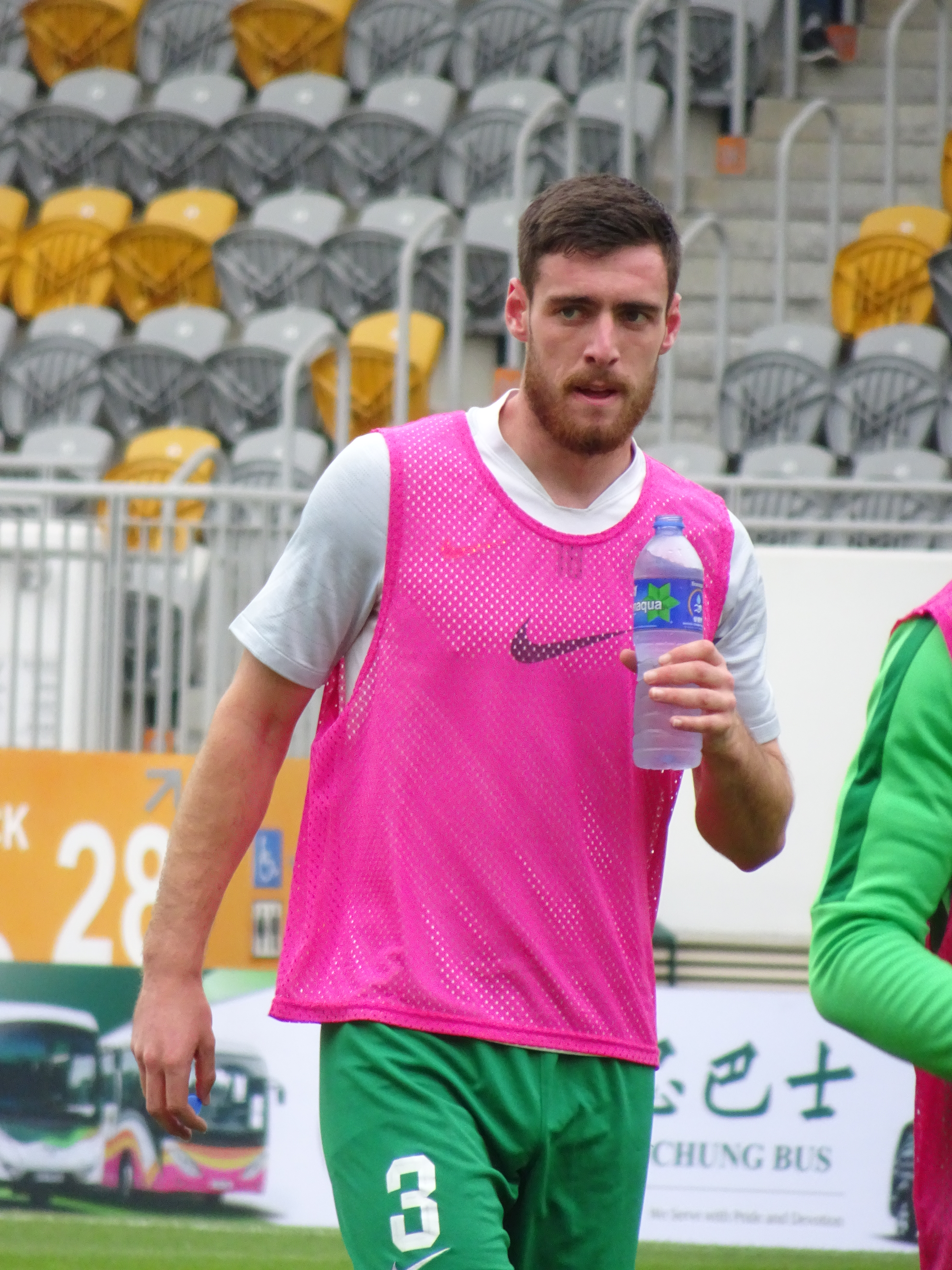

Personal information
- Full name: Benjamin Patrick van Meurs
- Date of birth: 31 January 1998 (age 28)
- Place of birth: Canberra, Australia
- Height: 1.88 m (6 ft 2 in)
- Position: Center-back

Team information
- Current team: Dong A Thanh Hoa
- Number: 4

Youth career
- 2012–2014: Canberra

Senior career*
| Years | Team | Apps | (Gls) |
| 2014 | Canberra | 4 | (0) |
| 2015 | Belconnen United | 16 | (0) |
| 2016–2019 | Sydney FC NPL | 18 | (0) |
| 2019–2020 | Tai Po | 5 | (0) |
| 2020–2023 | Sydney Olympic | 46 | (3) |
| 2023 | Hải Phòng | 6 | (0) |
| 2024– | Dong A Thanh Hoa | 4 | (0) |
- * Club domestic league appearances and goals as of 15 July 2023

Benjamin Patrick van Meurs (born 31 January 1998), commonly known as Ben van Meurs, is an Australian professional soccer player who plays as a centre-back for V.League 1 club Dong A Thanh Hoa.

== Honours ==
Thanh Hóa

- Vietnamese Cup: 2023–24
