= Tang Tsz Kwan =

Hong Kong footballer

Personal information
- Full name: Tang Tsz Kwan
- Date of birth: 22 November 1998 (age 27)
- Place of birth: Hong Kong
- Height: 1.77 m (5 ft 10 in)
- Positions: Winger; forward

Youth career
- 2014–2016: Metro Gallery

Senior career*
Years	Team	Apps	(Gls)
2016–2018	St. Joseph's	42	(33)
2018–2019	Dreams FC	2	(0)
2019–2020	Yuen Long	0	(0)
2020–2021	Hong Kong Rangers	4	(0)
2021–2022	Sai Kung	10	(9)
2022–2024	Sham Shui Po	28	(1)
2024–2025	Ravia		
2025	Bright Cerulean	1	(0)
2025–	Wan Chai	15	(13)
- * Club domestic league appearances and goals as of 31 May 2026

Tang Tsz Kwan (Chinese: 鄧子均; born 21 November 1998 in Hong Kong) is a Hong Kong professional footballer who plays as a forward.

== Club career ==
=== St. Joseph's ===
In the 2017–18 season, Tang was the top scorer in the league with 25 goals when he played for St. Joseph's in the Hong Kong Third Division.

=== Dreams FC ===
Tang started his professional career with Dreams FC in the Hong Kong Premier League, where he made two appearances.

=== Yuen Long ===
After Dreams FC's self-relegation, he played for Yuen Long in the 2019–20 season.

=== Rangers ===
On 10 September 2020, Rangers' Director of Football Philip Lee declared that Tang would join the club.

=== Sham Shui Po ===
On 8 August 2022, Tang joined Sham Shui Po.
