= Chiu Siu Wai =

Hong Kong footballer

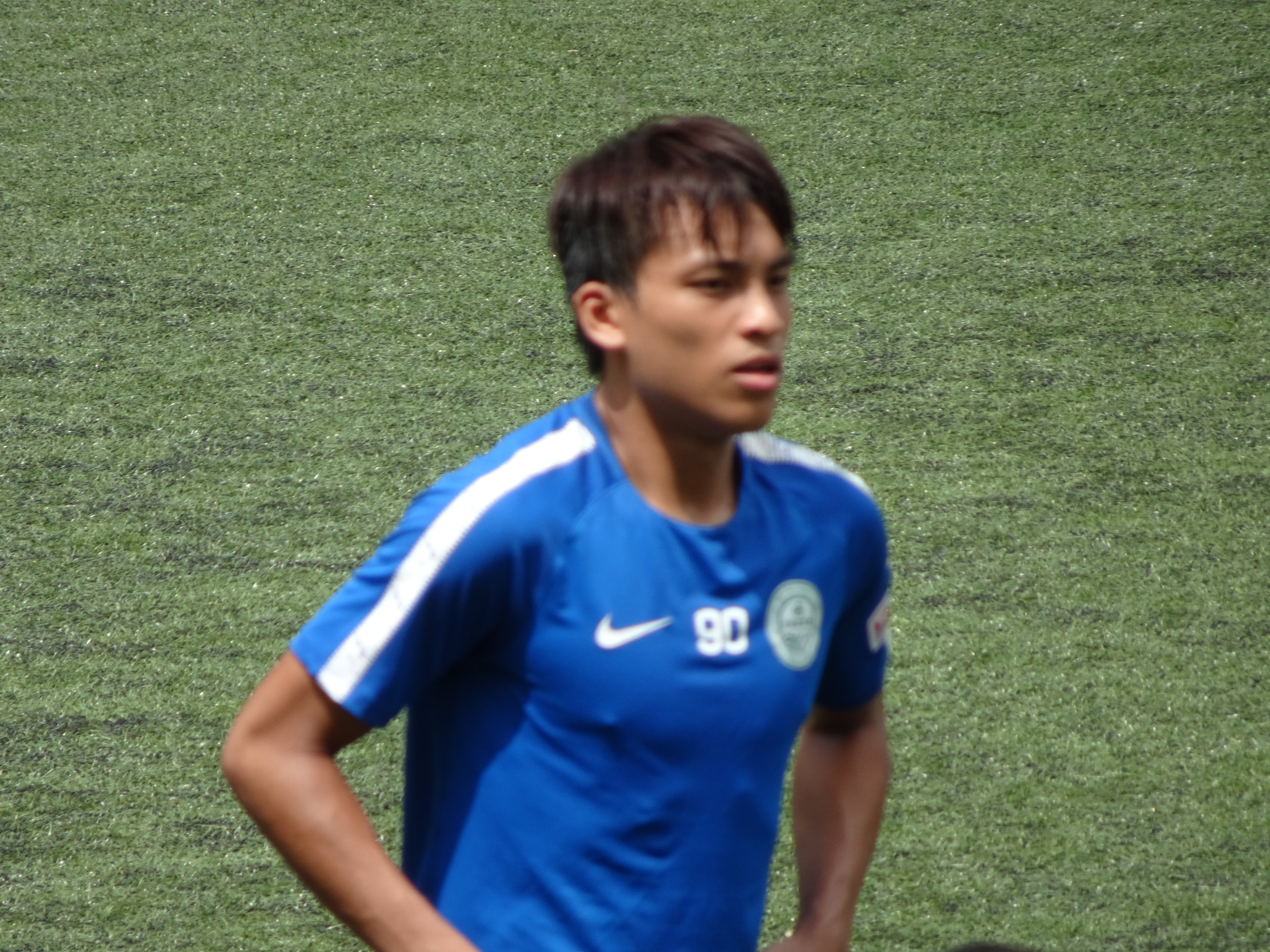

Personal information
- Full name: Chiu Siu Wai
- Date of birth: 16 February 1996 (age 30)
- Place of birth: Hong Kong
- Height: 1.75 m (5 ft 9 in)
- Position: Forward

Youth career
- 2011–2012: Tsuen Wan
- 2012–2014: Happy Valley

Senior career*
Years	Team	Apps	(Gls)
2015–2016	Wong Tai Sin	0	(0)
2016–2023	Tai Po	41	(8)
2019–2020	→ Happy Valley (loan)	4	(0)
2023–2024	Kowloon City	22	(9)
2024–	Resources Capital	46	(17)

International career
2018	Hong Kong U-23	2	(0)
- * Club domestic league appearances and goals as of 16 May 2026

Chiu Siu Wai (Chinese: 趙少維; born 16 February 1996) is a former Hong Kong professional footballer who played as a forward.

== Club career ==
On 2 October 2019, Chiu was loaned to Happy Valley.

In July 2023, Chiu joined Kowloon City.

== Honours ==
=== Club ===
Tai Po

- Hong Kong Sapling Cup: 2016–17
- Hong Kong Premier League: 2018–19
