= Lai Kak Yi =

Hong Kong footballer

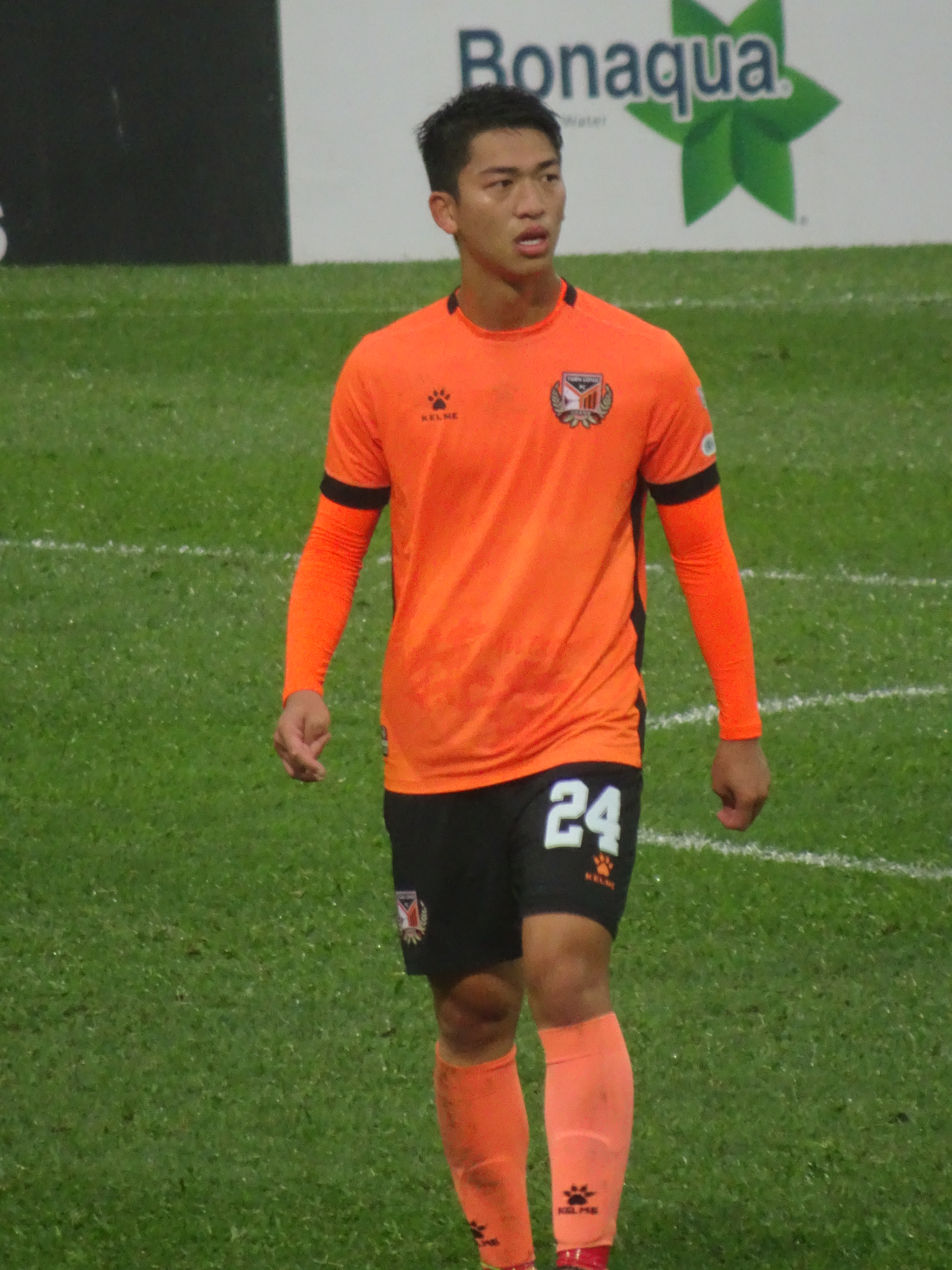

Personal information
- Full name: Lai Kak Yi
- Date of birth: 10 May 1996 (age 30)
- Place of birth: Hong Kong
- Height: 1.78 m (5 ft 10 in)
- Position: Midfielder

Team information
- Current team: Southern
- Number: 12

Senior career*
Years	Team	Apps	(Gls)
2014–2015	Happy Valley	11	(1)
2015–2016	Kwong Wah	9	(1)
2016–2017	Pegasus	0	(0)
2017–2018	Sun Source	20	(6)
2018–2020	Yuen Long	22	(0)
2020–2021	Pegasus	16	(1)
2021–2023	Sham Shui Po	28	(0)
2023–	Southern	52	(1)

International career^{‡}
2017	Hong Kong U-22	2	(0)
- * Club domestic league appearances and goals as of 7 November 2026 ‡ National team caps and goals as of 23 July 2017

Lak Kak Yi (Chinese: 黎格爾; born 10 May 1996) is a Hong Kong professional footballer who currently plays as a midfielder for Hong Kong Premier League club Southern.

== Club career ==
On 20 October 2020, Lai was named as one of the 17 new players for Pegasus.

In August 2021, Lai joined Sham Shui Po.

On 8 June 2023, Lai joined Southern.

== Honours ==
=== Club ===
Southern

- Hong Kong Sapling Cup: 2024–25
