= Wong Chi Hong =

Hong Kong footballer

Personal information
- Full name: Wong Chi Hong
- Date of birth: 25 January 1999 (age 27)
- Place of birth: Hong Kong
- Height: 1.75 m (5 ft 9 in)
- Positions: Midfielder; striker

Youth career
- Islands FT
- 2013–2014: Yokohoma FC Hong Kong
- 2014–2016: CFCSSHK

Senior career*
Years	Team	Apps	(Gls)
2016–2021	Happy Valley	63	(17)
2021–2022	HK U23	2	(0)
2022–	Yuen Long	87	(21)

International career
2014	Hong Kong U-16		
2017	Hong Kong U-19		
2021	Hong Kong U-22	1	(0)
- * Club domestic league appearances and goals as of 17 May 2026

Wong Chi Hong (Chinese: 黃智康; born 25 January 1999) is a former Hong Kong professional footballer who played as a midfielder or a striker.
