= Lee Oi Hin =

Hong Kong footballer

Personal information
- Full name: Lee Oi Hin
- Date of birth: 16 July 1999 (age 27)
- Place of birth: Hong Kong
- Height: 1.73 m (5 ft 8 in)
- Position: Midfielder

Youth career
- 2011–2014: Tuen Mun

Senior career*
| Years | Team | Apps | (Gls) |
| 2014–2017 | Tuen Mun | 44 | (1) |
| 2017–2018 | Kwong Wah | 11 | (3) |
| 2018–2019 | Yuen Long | 4 | (0) |
| 2019–2021 | Pegasus | 7 | (0) |
| 2021–2022 | Hong Kong Rangers | 0 | (0) |
| 2021–2022 | → HK U23 (loan) | 4 | (0) |
| 2022– | Yuen Long | 88 | (13) |

International career
| 2019 | Hong Kong U-23 | 1 | (0) |
- * Club domestic league appearances and goals as of 16 May 2026

Lee Oi Hin (Chinese: 李藹軒; born 16 July 1999) is a former Hong Kong professional footballer who played as a midfielder.
