= Football Association of Hong Kong, China =

Governing body of association football in Hong Kong

The Football Association of Hong Kong, China
AFC
- Founded: 01 June 1914; 112 years ago
- Headquarters: Kowloon, Hong Kong
- FIFA affiliation: 1954
- AFC affiliation: 1954
- EAFF affiliation: 2002
- President: Pui Kwan Kay
- Website: hkfa.com/en/

Football Association of Hong Kong, China
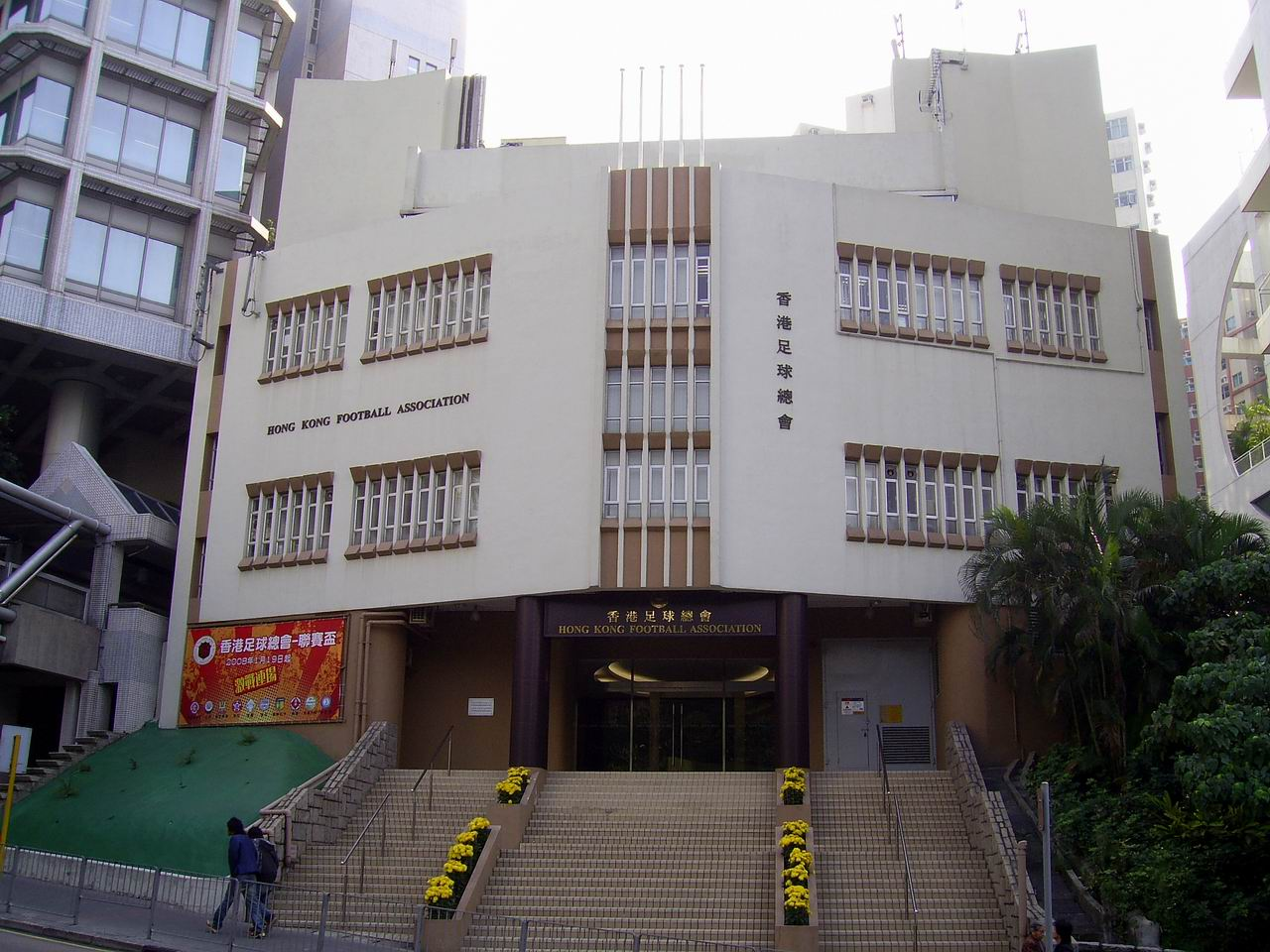
- The headquarters of HKFA in Ho Man Tin.
- Traditional Chinese: 中國香港足球總會
Transcriptions
Standard Mandarin
- Hanyu Pinyin: Zhōngguó Xiānggǎng Zúqiú Zǒnghuì
- Wade–Giles: Chungkuo Hsiangkang Tsuch'iu Tsunghui
Yue: Cantonese
- Yale Romanization: Jūnggwok Heunggóng jeuikàuh jungwuìh
- Jyutping: Zung1gwok3 Hoeng1gong2 zeoi3kau4 jung2wui2
- IPA: [tsʊŋ˧kwɔ:k˧.hœ́ːŋkɔ̌ːŋ.tsɵ̄ykɐ̏u.tsʊŋwȕːi]

The Football Association of Hong Kong, China (HKFA, Chinese: 中國香港足球總會; formerly Hong Kong Football Association) is the governing body of association football in Hong Kong. It is currently a member of FIFA, the Asian Football Confederation (AFC), and the East Asian Football Federation (EAFF). Its current chairman is Eric Fok.

== History ==
The HKFA was established in 1914. It is one of the oldest football federations in Asia and is responsible for organising various football competitions including professional and amateur leagues, football development and promoting football in Hong Kong.

In 1954, HKFA joined FIFA, and was also one of twelve founding associations of the Asian Football Confederation. Hong Kong played an important role in the early development of Asian football, and was given the honour of hosting the first Asian Cup competition in 1956, in which Hong Kong finished third in the tournament.

Hong Kong fields a separate FIFA-recognised representative team instead of the China PR national team.

HKFA is also responsible for operating the Hong Kong national football team (Chinese: 香港足球代表隊), which represents Hong Kong and competes in international football events.

HKFA's president is Pui Kwan Kay SBS and its chairman is Eric Fok JP. The CEO post has been eliminated since Joaquin Tam Chau Long's resignation as CEO. Tam's tenure was reported by media to have been controversial, with some executives leaving the association on his first day in office, along with being involved in two separate lawsuits with employees later.

=== Project Phoenix ===
Project Phoenix is a government-supported action plan to reform Hong Kong football from top to bottom.

=== 2010–11 ===
Former The FA executive director David Davies led the team of change agent - Scott Wilson Group, which was appointed by Hong Kong Football Association in September 2010 to carry out the reform and restructuring of football in Hong Kong.

On 21 November 2011, HKFA named Gordon McKie as its first chief executive officer (CEO). Gordon, the former chairman of the Scottish Rugby Union, had served HKFA for only ten months and resign from his post in September 2012 with personal reasons.

On 17 December 2011, HKFA appointed Ernie Merrick as the national head coach of Hong Kong Football Team. Merrick told to media that he felt honor to have an opportunity to participate the development and growing of Hong Kong football. Merrick won two titles in six season for Melbourne Victory. He started his new role on 9 January 2012.

On 23 December 2011, Kim Pan-Gon named national academy coach. Coach Kim will be wholly responsible for the identification, development and coaching of all players aged 18 and below.

=== 2012–13 ===
On 17 April 2012, Australian Steve O'Connor was appointed as the new technical director. The former head coach of the football program at the Australian Institute of Sport will take up his new post in will be responsible to improve the standards of local coaching, referee development, community and youth football activities and women's football. He will also oversee the implementation of elite player development pathways from grassroots football to senior international level.

On 17 September 2012, HKFA appointed Mark Sutcliffe to replace Gordon Mckie as the CEO of HKFA.

On 7 February 2013, the Hong Kong Football Association stated that the new Premier League would get under way in Autumn 2014, where it was suggested that the 2013–14 season would be a transition year.

On 28 May 2013, HKFA promoted Korean coach Kim Pan-Gon to replace Ernie Merrick as the head coach of Hong Kong national team.

=== 2015 ===
In June 2015, The Government turned green light to build a national training centre in Tseung Kwan O. The budget of construction will be fully supported by the Hong Kong Jockey Club.

On 29 November 2015, Asian Football Confederation awarded the AFC Developing Member Association of the Year award to Hong Kong Football Association in recognition of its professional administration and governance as well its exceptional contribution to the development and promotion of the game at all levels within the country.

=== 2019 ===
On 4 December 2019, Asian Football Confederation awarded the AFC Developing Member Association of the Year award to the Hong Kong Football Association in recognition of excellent work in football development, women and girls football, community and district football, referee development, sports science, charitable projects and the expansion of facilities with the opening on the long-awaited Football Training Centre.

=== 2023 ===
In March 2023, the football association changed its name from "The Hong Kong Football Association" (Chinese: 香港足球總會) to "The Football Association of Hong Kong, China" (Chinese: 中國香港足球總會) as a result of the Sports Federation and Olympic Committee of Hong Kong, China threatening to withdraw government funding for the HKFA. The rebrand was accompanied by a new emblem and a new emblem for the Hong Kong national football team.

== Criticism ==
Timothy Fok has served as president of the Hong Kong Football Association since 1997, after his father held the position for almost 30 years. In July 2020, the Legislative Council's Public Accounts Committee criticized the HKFA under Timothy Fok, stating its governance was "appalling and inexcusable". It noted that an internal audit committee, designed to review the association's use of taxpayer funding, was not active between 2015 and 2019, despite receiving HK$34 million in funding for the 2017-18 year. Members of the Legislative Council also questioned if that taxpayer money was justified and well spent. After HKFA's governance was criticized, the Legislative Council wanted to appoint board members to improve HKFA's governance, but the HKFA rejected the idea and claimed candidates should go through proper election procedures.

In 2020, the government's Audit Commission criticized HKFA, stating that the government had given HK$160,000,000 of taxpayer money to the HKFA but there was little improvement, and that Project Phoenix had a "lack of progress". The report stated that some performance metrics had even declined since 2009, rather than improving.

In August 2022, a former coach of the women's team was arrested for alleged sexual harassment of two female players. The association received a report from one of the victims but declined to intervene as the coach was no longer a staff member, stating "We feel there is no authority to intervene in the case after careful consideration since the case did not involve the association's current staff or took place at an association-sponsored event."

In May 2023, the Independent Commission Against Corruption (ICAC) arrested 23 people suspected of match fixing in lower divisions, including 1 coach and 11 players. Pui Kwan Kay, then-chairman of the HKFA, said that the scandal "would not have much effect on the holistic development of Hong Kong football" and that match fixing "is relatively hard to regulate."

In June 2024, the ex-head coach of Hong Kong football team, Jørn Andersen, said that HKFA receiving millions of taxpayer dollars every year made the HKFA have no motivation to improve, and said that the HKFA needed to be "more professional, from top to bottom," and did "not do enough" to improve the sport. He also named Eric Fok as not taking enough action for the sport.

== Renaming ==
After the handover of Hong Kong in 1997, the HKFA has used the founding name - the "Hong Kong Football Association" until 2023.

In early 2023, the HKFA and other Hong Kong national sports associations were required by the Sports Federation and Olympic Committee of Hong Kong, China, to add "China" to the name of the association. As the Sports Federation and Olympic Committee of Hong Kong, China warned to withhold government funding of HKFA, the HKFA eventually adopted the name change to "The Football Association of Hong Kong, China" during the annual meeting of the HKFA in March 2023.

In February 2024, the HKFA withdrew their esports team from AFC eAsian Cup 2023 because the AFC and KONAMI did not use "Hong Kong, China" instead of "Hong Kong" in the display name for the team.

== Funding ==
In terms of government funding, the HKFA has been one of the top receivers of taxpayer money out of all National Sports Associations in Hong Kong. Excluding one-time grants, it receives money from the Sports Subvention Scheme (SSS) and the Arts and Sport Development Fund (ASDF).

== Staff ==
Name	Position	Source
(Hong Kong) Pui Kwan Kay	President	
(Hong Kong) Eric Fok	Chairman	
(Hong Kong) Matthew Wong (Hong Kong) Casper Tsui	Vice-chairman	
(Hong Kong) Charles Cheung	General Secretary	
(Hong Kong) Sin Yat Kin	Treasurer	
(Hong Kong) Roberto Losada	Team Coach (Men's)	
(Brazil) Ricardo	Team Coach (Women's)	
Vacant	Media/Communications Manager	
(Hong Kong) Tsang Wai Chung	Futsal Coordinator	

=== List of previous chairmen ===
- Wong Kar-kui (1940–1950)
- Jack Skinner (1950–1954)
- C.S. Wong (1954–1960)
- Mok Hing (1960–1964)
- Norman Fraser (1964–1965)
- Mok Hing (1965–1966); second term
- Victor Hui (1996–1999)
- Martin Hong (1999–2007)
- Brian Leung (2007–2019)
- Pui Kwan Kay (2019–2023)

=== List of previous CEOs ===
- Gordon McKie (2011–2012)
- Mark Sutcliffe (2012–2018)
- Paul Woodland (2018–2020)
- Joaquin Tam (2021–2024)

=== List of previous presidents ===
- Henry Fok (1970–1997)
- Timothy Fok (1997–2023)

== See also ==
- Hong Kong national football team
- Hong Kong Premier League
- Hong Kong FA Cup
- Hong Kong Senior Shield
- Hong Kong League Cup
