= 2023–24 Hong Kong Premier League =

Football season

Hong Kong Premier League
- Season: 2023–24
- Dates: 19 August 2023 – 26 May 2024
- Champions: Lee Man
- 2024–25 AFC Champions League Two: Lee Man; Eastern
- Matches: 110
- Goals: 376 (3.42 per match)
- Top goalscorer: Henri Anier; Noah Baffoe (17 goals)
- Biggest home win: Rangers 9–0 Sham Shui Po (27 August 2023)
- Biggest away win: Resources Capital 0–6 Rangers (29 October 2023)
- Highest scoring: Rangers 9–0 Sham Shui Po (27 August 2023)
- Longest winning run: 7 matches Kitchee; Lee Man
- Longest unbeaten run: 20 matches Lee Man
- Longest winless run: 14 matches HK U23; Resources Capital
- Longest losing run: 11 matches Resources Capital
- Highest attendance: 2,310; Kitchee 2–3 Lee Man (26 May 2024)
- Lowest attendance: 79; HKFC 0–0 Sham Shui Po (26 May 2024)
- Total attendance: 63,490
- Average attendance: 577

The 2023–24 Hong Kong Premier League (also known as the BOC Life Hong Kong Premier League for sponsorship reasons) was the 10th season of the Hong Kong Premier League, the top division of Hong Kong football. The video assistant referee (VAR) review system is introduced this season.

== Teams ==
A total of 11 teams contest the league, including 10 teams from the 2022–23 Hong Kong Premier League and 1 team promoted from the 2022–23 Hong Kong First Division.

Club	Founded	Position of Last Season
Kitchee	1931	1st
Lee Man	2017	2nd
Rangers	1958	3rd
Eastern	1932	4th
Southern	2002	5th
HKFC	1886	6th
Tai Po	2002	7th
Resources Capital	1982	8th
Sham Shui Po	2002	9th
HK U23	2021	10th
North District	2002	3rd in First Division

- Yellow denotes a newly promoted club entering the league this year.

=== Stadia and locations ===
Locations of the 2023–24 Hong Kong Premier League clubs

Primary venues used in the Hong Kong Premier League:

Eastern Kitchee Rangers	HKFC	HK U23	Lee Man	North District
Mong Kok Stadium	HKFC Stadium	Hammer Hill Road Sports Ground	Tseung Kwan O Sports Ground	North District Sports Ground
Capacity: 6,664	Capacity: 2,750	Capacity: 2,200	Capacity: 3,500	Capacity: 2,500
Rangers Resources Capital	Sham Shui Po	Southern	Tai Po	
Tsing Yi Sports Ground	Sham Shui Po Sports Ground	Aberdeen Sports Ground	Tai Po Sports Ground	
Capacity: 1,500	Capacity: 2,194	Capacity: 9,000	Capacity: 3,200	

=== Personnel and kits ===
Team	Chairman	Head coach	Captain	Kit Manufacturer	Sponsors		
Team	Chairman	Head coach	Captain	Kit Manufacturer	Chest Sponsor	Rear Sponsor	Sleeve Sponsor
Eastern	Cheng Kai Ming	(Hong Kong) Roberto Losada	(Hong Kong) Leung Chun Pong	Adidas	XDAG	Upbest Group	Myprotein; Watsons Water
HKFC	Mark Grainger	(Hong Kong) Tony Hamilton-Bram	(Hong Kong) Jack Sealy	Adidas	The Executive Centre		Petrel Hong Kong
HK U23	Eric Fok	(Hong Kong) Szeto Man Chun	(Hong Kong) Lam Hok Hei	MC Sportswear	Vivere Sky Social Enterprise		Square Fitness
Kitchee	Ken Ng	(South Korea) Kim Dong-jin (Interim)	(Hong Kong) Huang Yang	Nike	EDPS Systems Ltd.		Gatorade; MEKO; TeamStation
Lee Man	Norman Lee	(Hong Kong) Tsang Chiu Tat	(Hong Kong) Fernando Recio	Macron	Lee & Man Chemical		Macron; Myprotein
North District	Chu Ho Yin	(Hong Kong) Leung Chi Wing	(Hong Kong) Ho Chun Ting	Kelme	Crownity Engineering Limited	North District	24/7 fitness Kelme; PHYSIOMAX
Rangers	Peter Mok	(Chinese Taipei) Vom Ca-nhum	(Hong Kong) Lam Ka Wai	Kelme	EGL Tours	Biu Chun Watch Hands	Hung Fook Tong; Kelme; MY Medicare Physiotherapy & Wellness; Watsons Water
Resources Capital	Hanson Wong	(Hong Kong) Ho Shun Yin (Interim)	(Hong Kong) Cheng King Ho	FCPM sports	Arrano Security	Future Hong Kong Football Development Charity Limited; New Fei Optical	L'Avenue; Qi Feng Capital
Sham Shui Po	Lo Wing Man	(Hong Kong) Chan Ho Yin	(Hong Kong) Ngan Cheuk Pan	Atacar	Sportshouse	3S Wellness & Sports Club	
Southern	Matthew Wong	(Hong Kong) Yeung Ching Kwong	(Japan) Shu Sasaki	Macron	MAN SE		
Tai Po	Lam Yick Kuen	(Hong Kong) Lee Chi Kin	(Brazil) Gabriel Cividini	UCAN		HINICHIJOU	Euro Asia Chinese Golf Association; HKPRC Physiotherapy; Superfans

=== Managerial changes ===
Team	Outgoing manager	Manner of departure	Date of vacancy	Position in table	Incoming manager	Date of appointment
Sham Shui Po	(Hong Kong) Kwok Kar Lok	End of contract	14 May 2023	Pre-season	(Hong Kong) Tang Kwun Yin	3 June 2023
Southern	(Hong Kong) Cheng Siu Chung	Change of role	21 May 2023	Pre-season	(Hong Kong) Yeung Ching Kwong	6 June 2023
Tai Po	(Hong Kong) Li Hang Wui	End of contract	21 May 2023	Pre-season	(Hong Kong) Lee Chi Kin	21 June 2023
Resources Capital	(Spain) Joan Esteva	End of contract	29 May 2023	Pre-season	(South Korea) Ha Hyeok-jun	21 July 2023
Rangers	(Hong Kong) Chiu Chung Man (Hong Kong) Wong Chin Hung (Hong Kong) Lai Ka Fai (Hong Kong) Poon Man Chun	Change of role	7 July 2023	Pre-season	(Chinese Taipei) Vom Ca-nhum	7 July 2023
North District	(Hong Kong) Choi Chung Yin	End of contract	10 July 2023	Pre-season	(Hong Kong) Leung Chi Wing	10 July 2023
Kitchee	(Hong Kong) Chu Chi Kwong	Change of role	29 September 2023	2nd	(South Korea) Kim Dong-jin (Interim)	29 September 2023
Sham Shui Po	(Hong Kong) Tang Kwun Yin	Termination of contract	29 October 2023	11th	(Hong Kong) Chan Ho Yin	9 November 2023
Resources Capital	(South Korea) Ha Hyeok-jun	Termination of contract	23 January 2024	9th	(Hong Kong) Ho Shun Yin (Interim)	23 January 2024

=== Foreign players ===
The number of foreign players teams can register is unlimited, with no more than 6 in the match squad and on the pitch during matches.

Club	Player 1	Player 2	Player 3	Player 4	Player 5	Player 6	Player 7	Player 8	Player 9	Player 10	Player 11	Former players
Eastern	(Kyrgyzstan) Tamirlan Kozubayev	(Scotland) Calum Hall	(South Korea) Ryu Ji-seong	(Spain) Daniel Almazan	(Spain) Noah Baffoe	(Spain) Marcos Gondra						
Kitchee	(Austria) Jakob Jantscher	(Bosnia and Herzegovina) Sedin Ramić	(Brazil) Cleiton	(Brazil) Mikael	(Brazil) Igor Sartori	(China) Ibrahim Kurban	(China) Enikar Mehmud	(England) Charlie Scott	(South Korea) Kim Shin-wook	(Turkmenistan) Ruslan Mingazow	(Uzbekistan) Sherzod Temirov	(North Macedonia) Aleksandar Damchevski (Nigeria) Ogenyi Onazi
Lee Man	(Argentina) Jonatan Acosta	(Brazil) Gil	(Brazil) Paulinho Simionato	(Estonia) Henri Anier	(Japan) Ryoya Tachibana	(Netherlands) Mitchel Paulissen	(Spain) José Ángel					
North District	(Brazil) Itallo	(Brazil) Kendy	(Brazil) Neném	(Brazil) Pedrão	(Brazil) Matheus Porto	(Spain) Carles Tena						
Rangers	(Brazil) Fernando Lopes	(Ghana) Nassam Ibrahim	(Japan) Ryota Hayashi	(Japan) Yosuke Kamigata	(Japan) Yumemi Kanda	(Japan) Akito Okamoto	(Japan) Makoto Rindo	(South Korea) Choi Woo-jae	(South Korea) Kim Min-kyu	(Ukraine) Oleksii Shliakotin		(Japan) Ryo Wada (Montenegro) Stefan Cadjenovic (Nigeria) John Uemofia (South Korea) Ma Sang-hoon (South Korea) Park Jong-bum
Resources Capital	(England) Benjamin Tandy Ortega	(Japan) Yuki Shibata	(Japan) Kotaro Umeda	(Nigeria) Chukwuemeka Ikondu	(South Korea) Kim Hyun-ho	(South Korea) Kim Sang-woo	(South Korea) Lee Yoon-kwon	(South Korea) Moon Ji-seong				(Australia) Bradie Smith (Brazil) Caíque Ribeiro (Japan) Anto Okamura (Nepal) Aryan Rai
Sham Shui Po	(China) Chen Hao	(Indonesia) Jhonattan Limbu	(Japan) Kota Odakura	(Kenya) Ismael Dunga	(Norway) Nii Noye Narh	(Serbia) Ivan Marković	(Serbia) Vanja Marković	(South Korea) Song Ju-ho				(Japan) Akihiro Koike (Thailand) Phumin Bores (Thailand) Panupong Wongpila (Ukraine) Oleksii Shliakotin
Southern	(Brazil) Junior Goiano	(Brazil) Kessi	(Brazil) Jackson Sousa	(France) Raphaël Merkies	(Japan) Kota Kawase	(Japan) Shu Sasaki	(Japan) Ryoo Togashi					(Nigeria) Robert Odu
Tai Po	(Brazil) Guilherme Biteco	(Brazil) Gabriel Cividini	(Brazil) Kayron	(Brazil) Luizinho	(Brazil) Marcão	(Brazil) Michel Renner	(Brazil) Lucas Silva	(Brazil) Gerson Vieira	(Chinese Taipei) Emilio Estevez			(South Korea) Park Ye-jun

There are no restrictions on the number of foreign players that HKFC can register. However, the team must have at least nine Hong Kong players in the squad, with no less than three on the pitch during matches.

Club	HK Player 1	HK Player 2	HK Player 3	HK Player 4	HK Player 5	HK Player 6
HKFC	(Hong Kong) Calum Bloxham	(Hong Kong) Jordon Brown	(Hong Kong) Timothy Chow	(Hong Kong) Fung Long Hin	(Hong Kong) Jahangir Khan	(Hong Kong) Lau Hok Ming
HKFC	HK Player 7	HK Player 8	HK Player 9	HK Player 10	HK Player 11	HK Player 12
HKFC	(Hong Kong) Lee Chun Yin	(Hong Kong) Daniel Man	(Hong Kong) Paulinho	(Hong Kong) Jack Sealy	(Hong Kong) Emmet Wan	(Serbia) Stefan Antonić

HK U23 is not allowed to register any foreign players. Meanwhile, the number of overaged players is restricted to five for the team and on the pitch during matches. The rest of the players must meet the registration status of U23 local players.

Club	Overaged Player 1	Overaged Player 2	Overaged Player 3	Overaged Player 4	Overaged Player 5
HK U23	(Hong Kong) Kwok Tsz Kaai	(Hong Kong) Lam Hok Hei	(Hong Kong) Leung Wai Fung	(Hong Kong) Ng Man Hei	

== League table ==
Pos	Team	Pld	W	D	L	GF	GA	GD	Pts	Qualification or relegation
1	Lee Man (C)	20	17	3	0	63	16	+47	54	Qualification for AFC Champions League Two group stage
2	Tai Po	20	14	4	2	41	12	+29	46 (Note: Tai Po are ahead of Eastern on head-to-head points: Tai Po 6, Eastern 0)	
3	Eastern	20	14	4	2	47	11	+36	46	Qualification for AFC Champions League Two group stage (Note: Eastern qualified for the AFC Champions League Two group stage as the 2023–24 Hong Kong FA Cup winners)
4	Kitchee	20	14	3	3	60	15	+45	45	
5	Southern	20	10	4	6	38	18	+20	34	
6	Rangers	20	8	0	12	41	34	+7	24	
7	HKFC	20	5	3	12	16	49	−33	18 (Note: HKFC are ahead of North District on head-to-head points: HKFC 4, North District 1)	
8	North District	20	5	3	12	27	43	−16	18	
9	Sham Shui Po (R)	20	3	3	14	18	52	−34	12	Relegation to First Division (Note: Sham Shui Po announced on 22 June 2024 that they would self-relegate)
10	HK U23 (W)	20	2	3	15	12	71	−59	9	Withdrew from league system (Note: HK U23 announced on 25 May 2024 that they would be dissolved after the end of the season)
11	Resources Capital (R)	20	1	4	15	13	55	−42	7	Relegation to First Division (Note: Resources Capital announced on 21 June 2024 that they would self-relegate)

Updated to match(es) played on unknown. Source: Hong Kong Football Association
Rules for classification: 1) Points; 2) Head-to-head points; 3) Head-to-head goal difference; 4) Head-to-head goals scored; 5) Goal difference; 6) Goals scored; 7) Fair-play points; 8) Drawing lots (Play-off if the winner has to be decided).
(C) Champions; (R) Relegated; (W) Withdrew

== Results ==
Home \ Away	EAS	HKF	U23	KIT	LEE	NOR	RAN	RES	SSP	SOU	TPF
Eastern	—	5–0	3–0	2–1	1–1	1–0	2–1	5–0	2–1	2–1	0–1
HKFC	0–2	—	2–1	1–3	0–4	1–0	0–3	4–1	0–0	0–5	0–3
HK U23	0–6	1–1	—	0–6	1–5	1–3	0–5	2–1	1–3	0–4	2–4
Kitchee	0–0	8–0	6–0	—	2–3	4–0	2–0	5–1	5–1	0–0	3–0
Lee Man	1–1	2–0	5–0	4–1	—	4–0	4–2	4–1	3–1	3–2	0–0
North District	1–2	2–2	0–1	2–3	0–4	—	0–1	3–2	4–1	1–2	1–3
Rangers	1–5	2–1	5–0	0–1	0–3	2–3	—	2–0	9–0	0–4	1–4
Resources Capital	0–4	1–3	0–0	1–4	1–3	1–1	0–6	—	0–0	0–1	1–1
Sham Shui Po	0–3	0–1	2–2	0–3	1–6	1–4	3–1	0–1	—	1–4	0–1
Southern	1–1	2–1	4–0	0–3	0–1	2–2	1–0	4–1	0–2	—	0–0
Tai Po	1–0	3–0	6–0	0–0	2–3	5–0	1–0	3–0	2–1	1–0	—

Updated to match(es) played on unknown. Source: HKFA
Legend: Blue = home team win; Yellow = draw; Red = away team win.

== Results by match played ==
Team ╲ Match	1	2	3	4	5	6	7	8	9	10	11	12	13	14	15	16	17	18	19	20
Eastern	W	L	W	W	D	W	D	W	L	W	W	D	W	D	W	W	W	W	W	W
HKFC	L	W	L	D	L	W	D	W	L	L	W	L	L	L	L	L	W	L	L	D
HK U23	L	L	D	L	L	D	L	D	L	L	L	L	L	L	W	L	L	L	W	L
Kitchee	W	W	L	W	W	D	W	W	W	W	W	W	W	D	W	D	W	L	W	L
Lee Man	W	W	W	W	W	D	W	W	W	D	W	W	D	W	W	W	W	W	W	W
North District	D	W	W	L	D	L	L	W	L	L	D	L	L	L	W	L	L	L	L	L
Rangers	W	L	L	L	W	W	W	L	L	L	L	L	W	L	L	L	L	W	W	W
Resources Capital	D	L	D	L	L	W	L	L	L	L	L	L	L	L	L	L	L	D	D	L
Sham Shui Po	L	L	L	L	L	L	L	L	D	W	L	W	L	L	W	L	L	D	L	D
Southern	W	W	W	L	L	D	W	D	W	W	L	W	D	W	W	L	L	D	L	W
Tai Po	L	W	W	W	W	L	W	W	D	W	W	W	W	D	W	W	D	W	D	W

== Positions by round ==
To preserve chronological evolvements, any postponed matches are not included to the round at which they were originally scheduled, but added to the full round they were played immediately afterwards. For example, if a match is scheduled for round 7, but then played between rounds 8 and 9, it will be added to the standings for round 9.

Leader - 2024–25 AFC Champions League Two

Team ╲ Round	1	2	3	4	5	6	7	8	9	10	11	12	13	14	15	16	17	18	19	20	21	22
Eastern	2	6	6	7	7	5	5	4	6	5	5	5	5	3	3	4	4	3	3	3	4	3
HKFC	8	10	10	8	8	8	9	9	8	8	8	7	8	7	7	8	8	8	8	8	8	7
HK U23	10	9	9	10	10	10	10	10	10	10	10	10	11	11	11	10	10	10	10	10	10	10
Kitchee	3	1	1	2	2	2	3	2	2	2	2	2	2	2	2	2	2	2	2	2	2	4
Lee Man	7	5	7	1	1	1	1	1	1	1	1	1	1	1	1	1	1	1	1	1	1	1
North District	4	7	4	5	5	6	8	8	7	7	7	8	7	8	8	6	6	6	7	7	7	8
Rangers	6	4	5	6	6	7	6	5	4	6	6	6	6	6	6	7	7	7	6	6	6	6
Resources Capital	5	8	8	9	9	9	7	7	9	9	9	9	9	9	10	11	11	11	11	11	11	11
Sham Shui Po	9	11	11	11	11	11	11	11	11	11	11	11	10	10	9	9	9	9	9	9	9	9
Southern	1	2	2	3	3	3	4	6	5	4	4	4	4	4	5	5	5	5	5	5	5	5
Tai Po	11	3	3	4	4	4	2	3	3	3	3	3	3	5	4	3	3	4	4	4	3	2

Source: Hong Kong Football Association website

== Fixtures and results ==
=== Round 1 ===
19 August 2023	Kitchee	3–0	Tai Po	Mong Kok, Kowloon
16:00 (UTC+8)	Juninho 32', 74'; Mikael 71' (pen.)	Report		Stadium: Mong Kok Stadium; Attendance: 1,434; Referee: Tam Ping Wun

19 August 2023	Resources Capital	1–1	North District	Tsing Yi, New Territories
18:30 (UTC+8)	Ribeiro 67'	Report	Matheus 90'	Stadium: Tsing Yi Sports Ground; Attendance: 549; Referee: Lau Fong Hei

20 August 2023	Eastern	3–0	HK U23	Mong Kok, Kowloon
16:00 (UTC+8)	Gondra 17'; Wong Ho Chun 36'; Kozubayev 58'	Report		Stadium: Mong Kok Stadium; Attendance: 599; Referee: Ho Wai Sing

20 August 2023	Sham Shui Po	1–4	Southern	Sham Shui Po, Kowloon
16:00 (UTC+8)	Tang Tsz Kwan 70'	Report	Goiano 20'; Pereira 30'; Chan Ching Him 57' (o.g.); Awal 83'	Stadium: Sham Shui Po Sports Ground; Attendance: 821; Referee: Poon Chun Kit

17 April 2024	Rangers	0–3	Lee Man	Mong Kok, Kowloon
20:00 (UTC+8)		Report	Anier 36'; Tsui Wang Kit 53'; Paulinho 60'	Stadium: Mong Kok Stadium; Attendance: 884; Referee: Poon Chun Kit

=== Round 2 ===
26 August 2023	Southern	4–0	HK U23	Aberdeen, Hong Kong Island
16:00 (UTC+8)	Awal 17'; Kessi 25'; Sasaki 53'; Pereira 61'	Report		Stadium: Aberdeen Sports Ground; Attendance: 404; Referee: Liu Kwok Man

26 August 2023	Eastern	0–1	Tai Po	Mong Kok, Kowloon
16:00 (UTC+8)		Report	Chan Siu Kwan 41'	Stadium: Mong Kok Stadium; Attendance: 867; Referee: Yu Kin Fung

26 August 2023	Resources Capital	1–3	Lee Man	Tsing Yi, New Territories
18:30 (UTC+8)	Ribeiro 49' (pen.)	Report	Everton 32'; Anier 36'; Paulinho 45+2'	Stadium: Tsing Yi Sports Ground; Attendance: 507; Referee: Tam Ping Wun

27 August 2023	Kitchee	8–0	HKFC	Mong Kok, Kowloon
16:00 (UTC+8)	Kim Shin-wook 14', 21', 24' (pen.); Tan Chun Lok 16'; Mingazov 27'; Mikael 30'; Sartori 55'; Brown 72' (o.g.)	Report		Stadium: Mong Kok Stadium; Attendance: 975; Referee: Luk Kin Sun

27 August 2023	Rangers	9–0	Sham Shui Po	Tsing Yi, New Territories
16:00 (UTC+8)	Ibrahim 17', 33', 64'; Lau Chi Lok 22', 39', 77'; Okamoto 53'; Kanda 74', 90+2' (pen.)	Report		Stadium: Tsing Yi Sports Ground; Attendance: 309; Referee: Woo Chun Sing

=== Round 3 ===
3 September 2023	Sham Shui Po	1–4	North District	Sham Shui Po, Kowloon
15:00 (UTC+8)	N. Benavides 10'	Report	Matheus 4'; Wong Wai Kwok 77', 90+4'; Lo Kong Wai 88'	Stadium: Sham Shui Po Sports Ground; Attendance: 652; Referee: Poon Chun Kit

3 September 2023	Tai Po	1–0	Rangers	Tai Po, New Territories
15:00 (UTC+8)	Chan Siu Kwan 90+4'	Report		Stadium: Tai Po Sports Ground; Attendance: 876; Referee: Liu Kwok Man

3 September 2023	Resources Capital	0–0	HK U23	Tsing Yi, New Territories
18:00 (UTC+8)		Report		Stadium: Tsing Yi Sports Ground; Attendance: 297; Referee: Woo Chun Sing

6 April 2024	Southern	2–1	HKFC	Aberdeen, Hong Kong Island
15:00 (UTC+8)	Tomas 15'; Merkies 87'	Report	Maciel 88'	Stadium: Aberdeen Sports Ground; Attendance: 178; Referee: Lau Fong Hei

1 May 2024	Eastern	2–1	Kitchee	Mong Kok, Kowloon
18:00 (UTC+8)	Kozubayev 24'; Baffoe 86'	Report	Temirov 45+3'	Stadium: Mong Kok Stadium; Attendance: 1,929; Referee: Liu Kwok Man

=== Round 4 ===
16 September 2023	Lee Man	4–1	Kitchee	Tseung Kwan O, New Territories
15:00 (UTC+8)	Anier 27', 71' (pen.); Everton 44'; Paulinho 90+9'	Report	Juninho 42'	Stadium: Tseung Kwan O Sports Ground; Attendance: 2,108; Referee: Lau Fong Hei

17 September 2023	Sham Shui Po	0–1	HKFC	Sham Shui Po, Kowloon
15:00 (UTC+8)		Report	Johns 16'	Stadium: Sham Shui Po Sports Ground; Attendance: 467; Referee: Luk Kin Sun

3 October 2023	Southern	4–1	Resources Capital	Mong Kok, Kowloon
20:00 (UTC+8)	Pereira 14', 45+1'; Kessi 31', 90+7'	Report	Okamura 8'	Stadium: Mong Kok Stadium; Attendance: 368; Referee: Woo Chun Sing

27 January 2024	Tai Po	6–0	HK U23	Tai Po, New Territories
15:00 (UTC+8)	Biteco 13', 49'; Lucas 20', 43'; Renner 72'; Cheng Chun Wang 89' (o.g.)	Report		Stadium: Tai Po Sports Ground; Attendance: 382; Referee: Liu Kwok Man

6 March 2024	Eastern	1–0	North District	Mong Kok, Kowloon
20:00 (UTC+8)	Ma Hei Wai 13'	Report		Stadium: Mong Kok Stadium; Attendance: 495; Referee: Liu Kwok Man

=== Round 5 ===
23 September 2023	Lee Man	5–0	HK U23	Tseung Kwan O, New Territories
18:00 (UTC+8)	Wong Wai 36'; Ángel 44'; Gil 55'; Paulinho 67'; Everton 82'	Report		Stadium: Tseung Kwan O Sports Ground; Attendance: 434; Referee: Tang Hing Fu

24 September 2023	Kitchee	2–0	Rangers	Mong Kok, Kowloon
15:00 (UTC+8)	Scott 7'; Jantscher 62'	Report		Stadium: Mong Kok Stadium; Attendance: 1,308; Referee: Tam Ping Wun

12 November 2023	HKFC	4–1	Resources Capital	Happy Valley, Hong Kong Island
16:30 (UTC+8)	Thiago 17'; Khan 38' (pen.); Henrique 81'; Brown 90+1' (pen.)	Report	Moon Chi-sung 4' (pen.)	Stadium: Hong Kong Football Club Stadium; Attendance: 571; Referee: Tam Ping Wun

10 March 2024	Eastern	2–1	Southern	Mong Kok, Kowloon
18:00 (UTC+8)	Gondra 28'; Baffoe 39' (pen.)	Report	Pereira 35' (pen.)	Stadium: Mong Kok Stadium; Attendance: 432; Referee: Woo Chun Sing

31 March 2024	North District	1–3	Tai Po	Sheung Shui, New Territories
15:00 (UTC+8)	Chu Wai Kwan 40'	Report	Cividini 42'; Biteco 46'; Luizinho 85'	Stadium: North District Sports Ground; Attendance: 457; Referee: Tam Ping Wun

=== Round 6 ===
7 October 2023	Eastern	2–1	Sham Shui Po	Mong Kok, Kowloon
15:00 (UTC+8)	Baffoe 35'; Ma Hei Wai 68'	Report	N. Benavides 14'	Stadium: Mong Kok Stadium; Attendance: 307; Referee: Luk Kin Sun

7 October 2023	Lee Man	3–2	Southern	Tseung Kwan O, New Territories
18:00 (UTC+8)	Everton 25', 56'; Ángel 89'	Report	Pereira 32' (pen.); Chen Ngo Hin 40'	Stadium: Tseung Kwan O Sports Ground; Attendance: 536; Referee: Ho Wai Sing

24 February 2024	Rangers	2–3	North District	Mong Kok, Kowloon
15:00 (UTC+8)	Kamigata 35'; Ibrahim 77'	Report	Neném 45+2' (pen.); Pedrão 73'; Porto 90+1' (pen.)	Stadium: Mong Kok Stadium; Attendance: 435; Referee: Tam Ping Wun

28 April 2024	HK U23	0–6	Kitchee	Diamond Hill, Kowloon
15:00 (UTC+8)	Mikael 18', 22', 45+2'; Juninho 31'; Temirov 75'; Shinichi Chan 88'	Report		Stadium: Hammer Hill Road Sports Ground; Attendance: 235; Referee: Luk Kin Sun

7 May 2024	Tai Po	3–0	HKFC	Tai Po, New Territories
19:45 (UTC+8)	Luizinho 3'; Lee Ka Ho 6'; Renner 90+2'	Report		Stadium: Tai Po Sports Ground; Attendance: 439; Referee: Cheung Wai Lung

=== Round 7 ===
21 October 2023	Tai Po	1–0	Southern	Tai Po, New Territories
15:00 (UTC+8)	Chan Siu Kwan 71'	Report		Stadium: Tai Po Sports Ground; Attendance: 549; Referee: Lau Fong Hei

22 October 2023	Sham Shui Po	0–1	Resources Capital	Sham Shui Po, Kowloon
15:00 (UTC+8)		Report	Yuen Sai Kit 71'	Stadium: Sham Shui Po Sports Ground; Attendance: 414; Referee: Liu Kwok Man

22 October 2023	HK U23	0–5	Rangers	Diamond Hill, Kowloon
15:00 (UTC+8)		Report	Lam Ka Wai 35'; Ibrahim 45', 74' (pen.); Hayashi 45+2'; Giovane 90+7'	Stadium: Hammer Hill Road Sports Ground; Attendance: 205; Referee: Poon Chun Kit

22 October 2023	HKFC	0–2	Eastern	Happy Valley, Hong Kong Island
16:30 (UTC+8)		Report	Sun Ming Him 45+2' (pen.); Baffoe 84'	Stadium: Hong Kong Football Club Stadium; Attendance: 782; Referee: Tang Hing Fu

10 March 2024	Lee Man	4–0	North District	Tseung Kwan O, New Territories
15:00 (UTC+8)	Paulinho 34'; Paulissen 38'; Everton 73'; Anier 87'	Report		Stadium: Tseung Kwan O Sports Ground; Attendance: 416; Referee: Tam Ping Wun

=== Round 8 ===
28 October 2023	Lee Man	1–1	Eastern	Tseung Kwan O, New Territories
18:00 (UTC+8)	Anier 59'	Report	Baffoe 47'	Stadium: Tseung Kwan O Sports Ground; Attendance: 840; Referee: Yu Kin Fung

29 October 2023	HK U23	1–1	HKFC	Diamond Hill, Kowloon
15:00 (UTC+8)	Lam Hok Hei 90+4' (pen.)	Report	Fray 57'	Stadium: Hammer Hill Road Sports Ground; Attendance: 166; Referee: Law Bik Chi

29 October 2023	Kitchee	5–1	Sham Shui Po	Mong Kok, Kowloon
15:00 (UTC+8)	Mikael 57', 60', 80'; Scott 64'; Poon Pui Hin 82'	Report	Dunga 90'	Stadium: Mong Kok Stadium; Attendance: 603; Referee: Luk Kin Sun

29 October 2023	Resources Capital	0–6	Rangers	Tsing Yi, New Territories
18:00 (UTC+8)		Report	Lau Chi Lok 2'; Ibrahim 19'; Kanda 24', 59'; Okamoto 44'; Li Ngai Hoi 70'	Stadium: Tsing Yi Sports Ground; Attendance: 368; Referee: Wong Wai Lun

24 December 2023	North District	1–2	Southern	Sheung Shui, New Territories
15:00 (UTC+8)	Lo Kong Wai 14'	Report	Sasaki 17'; Goiano 37'	Stadium: North District Sports Ground; Attendance: 568; Referee: Tam Ping Wun

=== Round 9 ===
7 October 2023	Tai Po	3–0	Resources Capital	Tai Po, New Territories
15:00 (UTC+8)	Luizinho 2'; Chung Wai Keung 25'; Wong Hin Sum 90+1'	Report		Stadium: Tai Po Sports Ground; Attendance: 275; Referee: Liu Kwok Man

5 November 2023	HKFC	0–3	Rangers	Happy Valley, Hong Kong Island
16:30 (UTC+8)		Report	Kanda 11' (pen.); Li Ngai Hoi 15'; Ma Sang-hoon 65'	Stadium: Hong Kong Football Club Stadium; Attendance: 605; Referee: Tang Hing Fu

24 November 2023	Kitchee	0–0	Southern	Mong Kok, Kowloon
20:00 (UTC+8)		Report		Stadium: Mong Kok Stadium; Attendance: 1,109; Referee: Wong Wai Lun

25 November 2023	HK U23	1–3	North District	Diamond Hill, Kowloon
15:00 (UTC+8)	Lam Hok Hei 88'	Report	Jordan Lam 13'; Kendy 45+5' (pen.); Yip Cheuk Man 51'	Stadium: Hammer Hill Road Sports Ground; Attendance: 143; Referee: Liu Kwok Man

26 November 2023	Lee Man	3–1	Sham Shui Po	Tseung Kwan O, New Territories
15:00 (UTC+8)	Anier 12'; Gil 15'; Paulissen 77'	Report	Dunga 47'	Stadium: Tseung Kwan O Sports Ground; Attendance: 386; Referee: Lau Fong Hei

=== Round 10 ===
8 December 2023	Kitchee	5–1	Resources Capital	Mong Kok, Kowloon
20:00 (UTC+8)	Fernando 14'; Mikael 17', 88'; Temirov 30'; Gerbig 71'	Report	Ho Sze Chit 76'	Stadium: Mong Kok Stadium; Attendance: 690; Referee: Law Pik Chi

9 December 2023	Eastern	2–1	Rangers	Mong Kok, Kowloon
18:00 (UTC+8)	Gondra 45+2', 86'	Report	Lau Chi Lok 56'	Stadium: Mong Kok Stadium; Attendance: 1,150; Referee: Tang Hing Fu

10 December 2023	Tai Po	2–3	Lee Man	Tai Po, New Territories
15:00 (UTC+8)	Kayron 19'; Chan Siu Kwan 81'	Report	Dudu 8'; Everton 10'; Paulinho 12'	Stadium: Tai Po Sports Ground; Attendance: 944; Referee: Wong Wai Lun

17 December 2023	Sham Shui Po	2–2	HK U23	Sham Shui Po, Kowloon
15:00 (UTC+8)	Dunga 76'; I. Marković 78'	Report	Lam Hok Hei 72' (pen.), 74'	Stadium: Sham Shui Po Sports Ground; Attendance: 434; Referee: Tam Ping Wun

17 December 2023	North District	2–2	HKFC	Sheung Shui, New Territories
15:00 (UTC+8)	Kendy 90+4'; Ho Chun Ting 90+6'	Report	Johns 25'; Paulinho 90+11'	Stadium: North District Sports Ground; Attendance: 683; Referee: Yu Kin Fung

=== Round 11 ===
3 December 2023	North District	2–3	Kitchee	Sheung Shui, New Territories
15:00 (UTC+8)	Jordan Lam 83'; Kendy 86'	Report	Fernando 12'; Temirov 16'; Mikael 44'	Stadium: North District Sports Ground; Attendance: 1,377; Referee: Luk Kin San

25 February 2024	Resources Capital	0–4	Eastern	Tsing Yi, New Territories
15:00 (UTC+8)		Report	Baffoe 45+2'; Leung Kwun Chung 58' (pen.); Braunshtain 61'; Bosley Yu 90'	Stadium: Tsing Yi Sports Ground; Attendance: 245; Referee: Yu Kin Fung

13 March 2024	Rangers	0–4	Southern	Mong Kok, Kowloon
20:00 (UTC+8)		Report	Awal 45'; Pereira 56' (pen.); Kessi 81'; Jackson 90+1'	Stadium: Mong Kok Stadium; Attendance: 546; Referee: Liu Kwok Man

14 April 2024	Sham Shui Po	0–1	Tai Po	Sham Shui Po, Kowloon
15:00 (UTC+8)		Report	Luizinho 65'	Stadium: Sham Shui Po Sports Ground; Attendance: 402; Referee: Cheung Wai Lung

20 April 2024	Lee Man	2–0	HKFC	Tseung Kwan O, New Territories
18:00 (UTC+8)	Anier 29', 90+3'	Report		Stadium: Tseung Kwan O Sports Ground; Attendance: 572; Referee: Wong Wai Lun

=== Round 12 ===
17 February 2024	Tai Po	5–0	North District	Tai Po, New Territories
15:00 (UTC+8)	Chan Siu Kwan 45'; Biteco 48'; Cividini 59'; Marcão 63'; Lucas 90+4'	Report		Stadium: Tai Po Sports Ground; Attendance: 582; Referee: Tang Hing Fu

17 February 2024	Southern	1–1	Eastern	Aberdeen, Hong Kong Island
15:00 (UTC+8)	Kessi 47' (pen.)	Report	Sun Ming Him 70'	Stadium: Aberdeen Sports Ground; Attendance: 383; Referee: Lau Fong Hei

17 February 2024	Rangers	0–1	Kitchee	Mong Kok, Kowloon
18:00 (UTC+8)		Report	Tan Chun Lok 34'	Stadium: Mong Kok Stadium; Attendance: 1,128; Referee: Wong Wai Lun

18 February 2024	HK U23	1–5	Lee Man	Diamond Hill, Kowloon
15:00 (UTC+8)	Ho Lung Ho 81'	Report	Anier 19'; Ngan Lok Fung 27'; Tsui Wang Kit 45'; Paulinho 77', 88'	Stadium: Hammer Hill Road Sports Ground; Attendance: 346; Referee: Yu Kin Fung

18 February 2024	Resources Capital	1–3	HKFC	Tsing Yi, New Territories
15:00 (UTC+8)	Lam Lok Yin 11'	Report	McMillan 22' (pen.), 27' (pen.); Léo 45'	Stadium: Tsing Yi Sports Ground; Attendance: 457; Referee: Woo Chun Sing

=== Round 13 ===
2 March 2024	Tai Po	1–0	Eastern	Tai Po, New Territories
15:00 (UTC+8)	Chan Siu Kwan 89'	Report		Stadium: Tai Po Sports Ground; Attendance: 651; Referee: Ho Wai Sing

2 March 2024	HK U23	0–4	Southern	Mong Kok, Kowloon
15:00 (UTC+8)		Report	Ichikawa 45+1'; Pereira 54'; Awal 56'; Ma Man Ching 80'	Stadium: Mong Kok Stadium; Attendance: 201; Referee: Tam Ping Wun

2 March 2024	Lee Man	4–1	Resources Capital	Tseung Kwan O, New Territories
18:00 (UTC+8)	Paulinho 67', 85', 89'; Tsui Wang Kit 71'	Report	Kim Hyun-ho 65'	Stadium: Tseung Kwan O Sports Ground; Attendance: 363; Referee: Tang Hing Fu

3 March 2024	Sham Shui Po	3–1	Rangers	Sham Shui Po, Kowloon
15:00 (UTC+8)	N. Benavides 6', 21', 80'	Report	Ibrahim 37'	Stadium: Sham Shui Po Sports Ground; Attendance: 361; Referee: Yu Kin Fung

3 March 2024	HKFC	1–3	Kitchee	Happy Valley, Hong Kong Island
15:00 (UTC+8)	Léo 31'	Report	Mikael 29' (pen.); Mingazow 45+6'; Juninho 66'	Stadium: Hong Kong Football Club Stadium; Attendance: 700; Referee: Wong Wai Lun

=== Round 14 ===
16 March 2024	Southern	2–2	North District	Aberdeen, Hong Kong Island
15:00 (UTC+8)	Merkies 63'; Jackson 67'	Report	Ng Wai Him 16' (o.g.); Lo Kong Wai 51'	Stadium: Aberdeen Sports Ground; Attendance: 253; Referee: Luk Kin Sun

16 March 2024	Rangers	2–0	Resources Capital	Tsing Yi, New Territories
15:00 (UTC+8)	Kanda 38'; Cheng King Ho 65' (o.g.)	Report		Stadium: Tsing Yi Sports Ground; Attendance: 210; Referee: Wong Po Sing

16 March 2024	Eastern	1–1	Lee Man	Mong Kok, Kowloon
18:00 (UTC+8)	Ma Hei Wai 61'	Report	Anier 90'	Stadium: Mong Kok Stadium; Attendance: 1,202; Referee: Poon Chun Kit

17 March 2024	Sham Shui Po	0–3	Kitchee	Sham Shui Po, Kowloon
15:00 (UTC+8)		Report	Mingazov 28', 48'; Mikael 59' (pen.)	Stadium: Sham Shui Po Sports Ground; Attendance: 739; Referee: Ho Wai Sing

17 March 2024	HKFC	2–1	HK U23	Happy Valley, Hong Kong Island
16:30 (UTC+8)	Léo 13', 74'	Report	Ng Man Hei 38'	Stadium: Hong Kong Football Club Stadium; Attendance: 252; Referee: Tam Ping Wun

=== Round 15 ===
24 February 2024	Lee Man	0–0	Tai Po	Tseung Kwan O, New Territories
15:00 (UTC+8)		Report		Stadium: Tseung Kwan O Sports Ground; Attendance: 888; Referee: Liu Kwok Man

30 March 2024	HK U23	1–3	Sham Shui Po	Diamond Hill, Kowloon
15:00 (UTC+8)	Lam Hok Hei 63' (pen.)	Report	Dunga 19'; Korani 34' (o.g.); Song Ju-ho 81'	Stadium: Hammer Hill Road Sports Ground; Attendance: 216; Referee: Tang Hing Fu

30 March 2024	Resources Capital	1–4	Kitchee	Tsing Yi, New Territories
18:00 (UTC+8)	Lee Yoon-kwon 28'	Report	Temirov 5'; Cleiton 17'; Russell 21'; Chan Ka Ho 82' (o.g.)	Stadium: Tsing Yi Sports Ground; Attendance: 377; Referee: Poon Chun Kit

31 March 2024	Rangers	1–5	Eastern	Mong Kok, Kowloon
18:00 (UTC+8)	Kanda 59' (pen.)	Report	Kozubayev 19'; Baffoe 39', 45+4'; Yu Joy Yin 90+2' (pen.); Ng Yu Hei 90+5'	Stadium: Mong Kok Stadium; Attendance: 617; Referee: Liu Kwok Man

12 May 2024	HKFC	1–0	North District	Happy Valley, Hong Kong Island
16:30 (UTC+8)	Paulinho 65'	Report		Stadium: Hong Kong Football Club Stadium; Attendance: 240; Referee: Wong Po Sing

=== Round 16 ===
25 February 2024	HKFC	0–5	Southern	Happy Valley, Hong Kong Island
16:30 (UTC+8)		Report	Jackson 47'; Merkies 54'; Sealy 66' (o.g.); Sasaki 83', 85'	Stadium: Hong Kong Football Club Stadium; Attendance: 511; Referee: Chow Hon Fai

6 April 2024	Rangers	1–4	Tai Po	Tsing Yi, New Territories
15:00 (UTC+8)	Kamigata 29'	Report	Lucas 18', 80'; Biteco 27'; Chan Siu Kwan 88'	Stadium: Tsing Yi Sports Ground; Attendance: 312; Referee: Wong Po Sing

6 April 2024	Kitchee	0–0	Eastern	Mong Kok, Kowloon
18:00 (UTC+8)		Report		Stadium: Mong Kok Stadium; Attendance: 1,807; Referee: Ho Wai Sing

7 April 2024	North District	4–1	Sham Shui Po	Sheung Shui, New Territories
15:00 (UTC+8)	Jordan Lam 25'; Pedrão 45+9', 65'; Matheus 85'	Report	Dunga 57' (pen.)	Stadium: North District Sports Ground; Attendance: 286; Referee: Woo Chun Sing

7 April 2024	HK U23	2–1	Resources Capital	Diamond Hill, Kowloon
15:00 (UTC+8)	Lam Hok Hei 8'; Umeda 57' (o.g.)	Report	Kim Hyun-ho 90+4'	Stadium: Hammer Hill Road Sports Ground; Attendance: 208; Referee: Yu Kin Fung

=== Round 17 ===
31 March 2024	HKFC	0–4	Lee Man	Happy Valley, Hong Kong Island
16:30 (UTC+8)		Report	Ángel 9'; Wong Wai 10'; Anier 55'; Chang Hei Yin 84'	Stadium: Hong Kong Football Club Stadium; Attendance: 392; Referee: Luk Kin San

13 April 2024	Southern	1–0	Rangers	Aberdeen, Hong Kong Island
15:00 (UTC+8)	Pereira 90+15' (pen.)	Report		Stadium: Aberdeen Sports Ground; Attendance: 285; Referee: Liu Kwok Man

13 April 2024	Eastern	5–0	Resources Capital	Mong Kok, Kowloon
15:00 (UTC+8)	Almazan 7'; Gondra 25'; Baffoe 41', 54' (pen.); Braunshtain 70'	Report		Stadium: Mong Kok Stadium; Attendance: 476; Referee: Wong Wai Lun

14 April 2024	Kitchee	4–0	North District	Mong Kok, Kowloon
15:00 (UTC+8)	Jantscher 18'; Juninho 45+2', 84'; Mikael 71'	Report		Stadium: Mong Kok Stadium; Attendance: 758; Referee: Tam Ping Wun

1 May 2024	Tai Po	2–1	Sham Shui Po	Tai Po, New Territories
15:00 (UTC+8)	Biteco 33' (pen.); Estevez 45+3'	Report	Wellingsson 45+2'	Stadium: Tai Po Sports Ground; Attendance: 488; Referee: Luk Kin Sun

=== Round 18 ===
1 October 2023	Lee Man	4–2	Rangers	Tseung Kwan O, New Territories
19:00 (UTC+8)	Gil 9'; Anier 11'; Tachibana 53'; Wong Wai 90+6'	Report	Ibrahim 36', 90+1'	Stadium: Tseung Kwan O Sports Ground; Attendance: 612; Referee: Yu Kin Fung

20 April 2024	Southern	0–2	Sham Shui Po	Aberdeen, Hong Kong Island
15:00 (UTC+8)		Report	Dunga 3'; Wellingsson 90+2'	Stadium: Aberdeen Sports Ground; Attendance: 190; Referee: Lau Fong Hei

20 April 2024	Tai Po	0–0	Kitchee	Tai Po, New Territories
15:00 (UTC+8)		Report		Stadium: Tai Po Sports Ground; Attendance: 1,481; Referee: Yu Kin Fung

21 April 2024	North District	3–2	Resources Capital	Sheung Shui, New Territories
15:00 (UTC+8)	Matheus 30', 66'; Kendy 41' (pen.)	Report	Lam Lok Yin 45+8'; Ho Sze Chit 57'	Stadium: North District Sports Ground; Attendance: 166; Referee: Cheung Wai Lung

21 April 2024	HK U23	0–6	Eastern	Diamond Hill, Kowloon
15:00 (UTC+8)		Report	Wong Tsz Ho 3'; Baffoe 20' (pen.), 41', 65', 79'; Almazan 45+3'	Stadium: Hammer Hill Road Sports Ground; Attendance: 143; Referee: Wong Po Sing

=== Round 19 ===
25 February 2024	Kitchee	6–0	HK U23	Mong Kok, Kowloon
15:00 (UTC+8)	Cleiton 25', 39' (pen.); Juninho 44'; Sartori 60', 63'; Buddle 90'	Report		Stadium: Mong Kok Stadium; Attendance: 474; Referee: Law Bik Chi

27 April 2024	Southern	0–1	Lee Man	Aberdeen, Hong Kong Island
15:00 (UTC+8)		Report	Gil 70'	Stadium: Aberdeen Sports Ground; Attendance: 559; Referee: Tam Ping Wun

28 April 2024	North District	0–1	Rangers	Sheung Shui, New Territories
15:00 (UTC+8)		Report	Okamoto 50'	Stadium: North District Sports Ground; Attendance: 263; Referee: Chow Hon Fai

28 April 2024	Sham Shui Po	0–3	Eastern	Sham Shui Po, Kowloon
15:00 (UTC+8)		Report	Almazan 52'; Ng Yu Hei 65', 76'	Stadium: Sham Shui Po Sports Ground; Attendance: 366; Referee: Tang Hing Fu

28 April 2024	HKFC	0–3	Tai Po	Happy Valley, Hong Kong Island
16:30 (UTC+8)		Report	Lucas 35'; Chan Siu Kwan 75'; Biteco 90+4'	Stadium: Hong Kong Football Club Stadium; Attendance: 483; Referee: Poon Chun Kit

=== Round 20 ===
4 May 2024	Southern	0–0	Tai Po	Aberdeen, Hong Kong Island
15:00 (UTC+8)		Report		Stadium: Aberdeen Sports Ground; Attendance: 248; Referee: Wong Wai Lun

5 May 2024	North District	0–4	Lee Man	Sheung Shui, New Territories
15:00 (UTC+8)		Report	Gil 45+3'; Ángel 58'; Wu Chun Ming 73'; Paulissen 76'	Stadium: North District Sports Ground; Attendance: 640; Referee: Yu Kin Fung

5 May 2024	Resources Capital	0–0	Sham Shui Po	Tsing Yi, New Territories
15:00 (UTC+8)		Report		Stadium: Tsing Yi Sports Ground; Attendance: 250; Referee: Ho Wai Sing

5 May 2024	Rangers	5–0	HK U23	Mong Kok, Kowloon
18:00 (UTC+8)	Ibrahim 8' (pen.), 75'; Hayashi 18'; Kanda 31'; Lam Hok Hei 83' (o.g.)	Report		Stadium: Mong Kok Stadium; Attendance: 321; Referee: Woo Chun Sing

22 May 2024	Eastern	5–0	HKFC	Mong Kok, Kowloon
20:00 (UTC+8)	Baffoe 35', 90', 90+4' (pen.); Wong Ho Chun 51', 64'	Report		Stadium: Mong Kok Stadium; Attendance: 291; Referee: Tam Ping Wun

=== Round 21 ===
18 May 2024	Southern	0–3	Kitchee	Aberdeen, Hong Kong Island
15:00 (UTC+8)		Report	Fernando 4'; Scott 69'; Cleiton 70'	Stadium: Aberdeen Sports Ground; Attendance: 456; Referee: Yu Kin Fung

18 May 2024	Resources Capital	1–1	Tai Po	Tsing Yi, New Territories
15:00 (UTC+8)	Ki Sze Ho 66'	Report	Lee Ka Ho 45+2'	Stadium: Tsing Yi Sports Ground; Attendance: 248; Referee: Woo Chun Sing

19 May 2024	North District	0–1	HK U23	Sheung Shui, New Territories
15:00 (UTC+8)		Report	Lam Hok Hei 34'	Stadium: North District Sports Ground; Attendance: 849; Referee: Ho Wai Sing

19 May 2024	Sham Shui Po	1–6	Lee Man	Sham Shui Po, Kowloon
15:00 (UTC+8)	Chen Hao 86'	Report	Anier 25', 36'; Gil 49'; Acosta 66'; Cheng Siu Kwan 77'; Li Ngai Hoi 85'	Stadium: Sham Shui Po Sports Ground; Attendance: 1,633; Referee: Tang Hing Fu

19 May 2024	Rangers	2–1	HKFC	Tsing Yi, New Territories
18:00 (UTC+8)	Rindo 45+2'; Lau Chi Lok 45+4'	Report	Paulinho 90+3'	Stadium: Tsing Yi Sports Ground; Attendance: 213; Referee: Cheung Wai Lung

=== Round 22 ===
26 May 2024	Resources Capital	0–1	Southern	Tsing Yi, New Territories
15:00 (UTC+8)		Report	Merkies 26'	Stadium: Tsing Yi Sports Ground; Attendance: 200; Referee: Poon Chun Kit

26 May 2024	North District	1–2	Eastern	Sheung Shui, New Territories
15:00 (UTC+8)	Ho Chun Ting 75'	Report	Gondra 83'; Wong Ho Chun 90'	Stadium: North District Sports Ground; Attendance: 315; Referee: Luk Kin Sun

26 May 2024	Kitchee	2–3	Lee Man	Mong Kok, Kowloon
15:00 (UTC+8)	Mikael 68', 70'	Report	Anier 31', 45+2'; Tachibana 40'	Stadium: Mong Kok Stadium; Attendance: 2,310; Referee: Lau Fong Hei

26 May 2024	HKFC	0–0	Sham Shui Po	Aberdeen, Hong Kong Island
15:00 (UTC+8)		Report		Stadium: Aberdeen Sports Ground; Attendance: 79; Referee: Wong Wai Lun

26 May 2024	HK U23	2–4	Tai Po	Diamond Hill, Kowloon
15:00 (UTC+8)	Leung Wai Fung 38' (pen.); Lau Ka Kiu 90'	Report	Lucas 50', 56'; Chan Siu Kwan 61'; Gerson 71'	Stadium: Hammer Hill Road Sports Ground; Attendance: 284; Referee: Tang Hing Fu

== Season statistics ==
=== Top scorers ===
Rank	Player	Club	Goals
1	(Estonia) Henri Anier	Lee Man	17
1	(Spain) Noah Baffoe	Eastern	17
3	(Brazil) Mikael	Kitchee	16
4	(Ghana) Nassam Ibrahim	Rangers	12
5	(Brazil) Paulinho Simionato	Lee Man	11
6	(Hong Kong) Chan Siu Kwan	Tai Po	9
6	(Hong Kong) Stefan Pereira	Southern	9
8	(Hong Kong) Juninho	Kitchee	8
8	(Japan) Yumemi Kanda	Rangers	8
8	(Brazil) Lucas Silva	Tai Po	8

=== Hat-tricks ===
Note: The results column shows the scorer's team score first. Teams in bold are home teams.

#	Player	For	Against	Result	Date	Ref
1	(South Korea) Kim Shin-wook	Kitchee	HKFC	8–0	27 August 2023	
2	(Ghana) Nassam Ibrahim	Rangers	Sham Shui Po	9–0	27 August 2023	
3	(Hong Kong) Lau Chi Lok	Rangers	Sham Shui Po	9–0	27 August 2023	
4	(Brazil) Mikael	Kitchee	Sham Shui Po	5–1	29 October 2023	
5	(Brazil) Paulinho Simionato	Lee Man	Resources Capital	4–1	3 March 2024	
6	(Hong Kong) Nicholas Benavides	Sham Shui Po	Rangers	3–1	3 March 2024	
7	(Spain) Noah Baffoe^{^{4}}	Eastern	HK U23	6–0	21 April 2024	
8	(Brazil) Mikael	Kitchee	HK U23	6–0	28 April 2024	
9	(Spain) Noah Baffoe	Eastern	HKFC	5–0	22 May 2024	

^{4} Player scored 4 goals

=== Clean sheets ===
Rank	Player	Club	Matches
1	(Hong Kong) Tse Ka Wing	Tai Po	12
2	(Hong Kong) Yapp Hung Fai	Eastern	9
3	(Hong Kong) Chan Ka Ho	Lee Man	8
4	(Hong Kong) Ng Wai Him	Southern	7
5	(Hong Kong) Paulo César	Kitchee	6
5	(Hong Kong) Wang Zhenpeng	Kitchee	6
7	(Hong Kong) Leung Hing Kit	Rangers / Sham Shui Po	5
8	(Hong Kong) Lo Siu Kei	Rangers	4
9	(Hong Kong) Pong Cheuk Hei	Resources Capital	2
9	(Hong Kong) Michael Wan	HK U23	2
10	10 players		1

== Attendances ==
Pos	Team	Total	High	Low	Average	Change
1	Kitchee	11,468	2,310	474	1,147	−32.8%
2	Eastern	7,748	1,929	291	775	−25.7%
3	Lee Man	7,155	2,108	363	716	−12.4%
4	Tai Po	6,667	1,481	275	667	+14.2%
5	Sham Shui Po	6,289	1,633	361	629	−16.2%
6	North District	5,604	1,377	166	560	n/a^{1}
8	Rangers	4,975	1,128	213	498	+6.9%
7	HKFC	4,615	782	79	462	−44.0%
9	Resources Capital	3,498	549	200	350	−33.2%
10	Southern	3,324	559	178	332	−33.9%
11	HK U23	2,147	346	143	215	−21.8%
	League total	63,490	2,310	79	577	−23.0%

Source: HKFA
Notes:
1: Team did not play in the Premier League last season

== Awards ==
=== Hong Kong Top Footballer Awards ===
Awards	Prize Winner	Club	Score / Votes
Footballer of the Year	(Hong Kong) Chan Siu Kwan	Tai Po	67.00%
Coach of the Year	(Hong Kong) Roberto Losada	Eastern	50.86%
Young Players of the Year	(Hong Kong) Yu Joy Yin	Eastern	61.40%
Young Players of the Year	(Hong Kong) Ma Hei Wai	Eastern	33.64%
Players' Player	(Spain) Noah Baffoe	Eastern	117
Most Favorite Player	(Hong Kong) Chan Siu Kwan	Tai Po	4,575
Best HKRT Player in the HKPL	(Hong Kong) Chan Siu Kwan	Tai Po	58.32%
Hong Kong Top Footballers
Goalkeeper	(Hong Kong) Tse Ka Wing	Tai Po	47.90%
Defenders	(Brazil) Gabriel Cividini	Tai Po	45.19%
Defenders	(Hong Kong) Tsui Wang Kit	Lee Man	42.44%
Defenders	(Kyrgyzstan) Tamirlan Kozubayev	Eastern	40.10%
Defenders	(Spain) Daniel Almazan	Eastern	29.06%
Midfielders	(Hong Kong) Chan Siu Kwan	Tai Po	67.00%
Midfielders	(Brazil) Mikael	Kitchee	29.18%
Midfielders	(Spain) Marcos Gondra	Eastern	28.01%
Forwards	(Spain) Noah Baffoe	Eastern	63.97%
Forwards	(Estonia) Henri Anier	Lee Man	40.82%
Forwards	(Hong Kong) Everton Camargo	Lee Man	30.87%
