= 2023–24 Hong Kong FA Cup =

Tournament details
- Country: Hong Kong
- Dates: 14 October 2023 – 1 June 2024
- Teams: 11

Final positions
- Champions: Eastern
- Runners-up: Sham Shui Po

Tournament statistics
- Matches played: 10
- Goals scored: 30 (3 per match)
- Attendance: 8,428 (843 per match)
- Top goal scorer(s): Noah Baffoe (4 goals)

Awards
- Best player: Li Yat Chun

The 2023–24 Hong Kong FA Cup was the 49th edition of the Hong Kong FA Cup. 11 teams entered this edition. The competition was only open to clubs who participate in the 2023–24 Hong Kong Premier League, with lower division sides entering the Junior Division, a separate competition. The winners of this year's FA Cup qualified for the 2024–25 AFC Champions League Two group stage.

Kitchee were the defending champions of the competition, but were eliminated in the semi-finals.

Eastern became the champions for the sixth time after beating Sham Shui Po in the final.

== Calendar ==
Phase	Round	Draw Date	Date	Matches	Clubs
Knockout phase	First round	11 October 2023	14 October – 25 November 2023	3	11 → 8
Knockout phase	Quarter-finals	11 October 2023	2 December 2023 – 9 March 2024	4	8 → 4
Knockout phase	Semi-finals	11 October 2023	11 – 12 May 2024	2	4 → 2
Knockout phase	Final	11 October 2023	1 June 2024	1	2 → 1

== Bracket ==
First round
25 November 2023
Tai Po	0
**Resources Capital**	**1**
21 October 2023
North District	1
**Lee Man**	**4**
14 October 2023
**Sham Shui Po**	**1**
HK U23	0

Quarter-finals
9 March 2024
**Kitchee**	**2**
HKFC	0
16 December 2023
**Eastern**	**1**
Resources Capital	0
2 December 2023
Rangers	3
**Lee Man**	**4**
9 December 2023
Southern	1 (4)
**Sham Shui Po (p)**	**1 (5)**

Semi-finals
12 May 2024
Kitchee	1
**Eastern**	**2**
11 May 2024
Lee Man	1
**Sham Shui Po**	**2**

Final
1 June 2024
**Eastern (a.e.t.)**	**3***
Sham Shui Po	2

Bold = winner
* = after extra time, ( ) = penalty shootout score

== Fixtures and results ==
Times are in Hong Kong Time (UTC+08:00).

=== First round ===
14 October 2023	**Sham Shui Po**	**1–0**	HK U23	Mong Kok
15:00	Leung Sing Yiu 69'	Report		Stadium: Mong Kok Stadium; Attendance: 230; Referee: Luk Kin Sun

21 October 2023	North District	**1–4**	**Lee Man**	Tsing Yi
15:00	Kendy 69' (pen.)	Report	Paulissen 51'; Wong Wai 62'; Acosta 84'; Paulinho 90+6'	Stadium: Tsing Yi Sports Ground; Attendance: 294; Referee: Tam Ping Wun

25 November 2023	Tai Po	**0–1**	**Resources Capital**	Mong Kok
15:00		Report	Lee Ching 3'	Stadium: Mong Kok Stadium; Attendance: 393; Referee: Ho Wai Sing

=== Quarter-finals ===
2 December 2023	Rangers	**3–4**	**Lee Man**	Mong Kok
15:00	Kanda 34' (pen.); Ibrahim 69', 82'	Report	Paulinho 18' (pen.), 21'; Gil 27'; Park Jong-bum 55' (o.g.)	Stadium: Mong Kok Stadium; Attendance: 1,010; Referee: Tam Ping Wun

9 December 2023	Southern	**1–1** (a.e.t.) (**4–5** p)	**Sham Shui Po**	Tai Po
15:00	Goiano 41'	Report	Song Ju-ho 90+3'	Stadium: Tai Po Sports Ground; Attendance: 202; Referee: Ho Wai Sing
	**Penalties**
	Pereira (penalty scored); Kessi (penalty scored); Goiano (penalty scored); Awal (penalty missed); Sasaki (penalty scored)		V. Marković (penalty scored); I. Marković (penalty scored); Ngan Cheuk Pan (penalty scored); Dunga (penalty scored); N. Benavides (penalty scored)

16 December 2023	**Eastern**	**1–0**	Resources Capital	Mong Kok
15:00	Ma Hei Wai 2'	Report		Stadium: Mong Kok Stadium; Attendance: 554; Referee: Lau Fong Hei

9 March 2024	**Kitchee**	**2–0**	HKFC	Mong Kok
15:00	Roberto 5'; Temirov 82'	Report		Stadium: Mong Kok Stadium; Attendance: 463; Referee: Poon Chun Kit

=== Semi-finals ===
11 May 2024	Lee Man	**1–2**	**Sham Shui Po**	Aberdeen
15:00	Wong Wai 29'	Report	N. Benavides 53'; Dunga 73'	Stadium: Aberdeen Sports Ground; Attendance: 450; Referee: Wong Wai Lung

12 May 2024	Kitchee	**1–2**	**Eastern**	Mong Kok
16:30	Mikael 76'	Report	Baffoe 18', 78'	Stadium: Mong Kok Stadium; Attendance: 1,395; Referee: Tam Ping Wun

=== Final ===
1 June 2024	**Eastern**	**3–2** (a.e.t.)	Sham Shui Po	Mong Kok
15:30 UTC+8	Kozubayev 100'; Baffoe 102', 115'	Report	N. Benavides 103'; Dunga 105+5'	Stadium: Mong Kok Stadium; Attendance: 3,437; Referee: Yu Kin Fung

== Top scorers ==
Rank	Player	Club	Goals
1	(Spain) Noah Baffoe	Eastern	4
2	(Brazil) Paulinho Simionato	Lee Man	3
3	(Hong Kong) Nicholas Benavides	Sham Shui Po	2
3	(Kenya) Ismael Dunga	Sham Shui Po	2
3	(Ghana) Nassam Ibrahim	Rangers	2
3	(Hong Kong) Wong Wai	Lee Man	2
7	16 players		1
