= Chen Hao (footballer, born 2002) =

Chinese-born Hong Kong football player

Personal information
- Full name: Chen Hao
- Date of birth: 11 January 2002 (age 24)
- Place of birth: Qingyuan, Guangdong, China
- Height: 1.76 m (5 ft 9 in)
- Position: Midfielder

Team information
- Current team: Rangers (HKG)
- Number: 11

Youth career
- 2014–2018: Valencia
- 2018–2020: Villarreal

Senior career*
Years	Team	Apps	(Gls)
2022	North District	0	(0)
2022–2024	Sham Shui Po	28	(1)
2024–2025	HKFC	16	(1)
2025–	Rangers (HKG)	15	(0)
- * Club domestic league appearances and goals as of 21 November 2026

Chen Hao (Chinese: 陈灏; born 11 January 2002) is a professional footballer who currently plays as a midfielder for Hong Kong Premier League club Rangers. Born in China, he acquired his HKSAR passport in September 2026.

== Club career ==
Born in Qingyuan, Guangdong, Chen started playing football in primary school, before moving to Spain at the age of twelve to join the academy of Valencia, as part of the Wanda Group initiative to bring young Chinese players to Spanish clubs. In 2018, he transferred to Villarreal, after the Wanda Group terminated their deal with Valencia.

Due to the COVID-19 pandemic in Spain, Chen returned to Guangzhou, before moving to Hong Kong in November 2021. Following a trial at Sham Shui Po, he signed for First Division team North District, while training with Premier League side Resources Capital.

On 8 August 2022, Chen joined Hong Kong Premier League club Sham Shui Po. On 1 October, he scored the first professional career goal in a 1–5 Sapling Cup defeat against Tai Po. On 2 April 2023, he scored his second goal of the season, in a 3–2 win over Tai Po in the Sapling Cup. His goal from just outside the box was voted as the Goal of the Month.

On 25 August 2024, HKFC head coach Chancey Cooke revealed that the club secured the signing of Chen in which he featured during a pre-season friendly fixture against Central & Western.

On 27 July 2025, Chen joined Rangers.

== International career ==
Chen is eligible to represent both China and Hong Kong at the international level, as his mother is from Hong Kong, and he has had a Hong Kong ID card since 2019.

On 1 September 2026, Chen officially announced that he had received a HKSAR passport, making him eligible to represent Hong Kong internationally.

== Career statistics ==
=== Club ===
As of 2 March 2025.

Club	Season	League			National Cup		League Cup		Other		Total	
Club	Season	Division	Apps	Goals	Apps	Goals	Apps	Goals	Apps	Goals	Apps	Goals
North District	2021–22	First Division	0	0	0	0	5 (Note: Appearances in the First Division League Cup)	0	0	0	5	0
Sham Shui Po	2022–23	Premier League	17	0	1	0	6 (Note: Appearances in the Sapling Cup)	2	1 (Note: Appearances in the Senior Shield)	0	25	2
Sham Shui Po	2023–24	Premier League	11	1	2	0	5	0	1	0	19	1
Sham Shui Po	Total		28	1	3	0	11	2	2	0	44	3
HKFC	2024–25	Premier League	12	1	1	0	2	0	1	0	16	1
Career total			40	2	4	0	18	2	3	0	65	4
