= Wong Ho Chun =

Hong Kong footballer

Wong Ho Chun 黃皓雋
Personal information
- Full name: Anson Wong Ho Chun
- Date of birth: 2 April 2002 (age 24)
- Place of birth: Hong Kong
- Height: 1.73 m (5 ft 8 in)
- Positions: Attacking midfielder; left winger; right winger

Team information
- Current team: Southern
- Number: 10

Youth career
- –2016: Kitchee
- 2016–2017: South China

Senior career*
Years	Team	Apps	(Gls)
2017–2020	South China	31	(4)
2020–2022	Lee Man	5	(0)
2022–2025	Eastern	45	(7)
2025	Qingdao Hainiu	13	(0)
2026	Kitchee	7	(3)
2026–	Southern	6	(0)

International career^{‡}
2017–2018	Hong Kong U-16	6	(0)
2019	Hong Kong U-19	6	(0)
2023–2024	Hong Kong	2	(0)
- * Club domestic league appearances and goals as of 21 November 2026 ‡ National team caps and goals as of 11 June 2024

Anson Wong Ho Chun (Chinese: 黃皓雋; born 2 April 2002) is a Hong Kong professional footballer who currently plays as an attacking midfielder, left winger or right winger for Hong Kong Premier League club Southern and the Hong Kong national team.

== Club career ==
=== Lee Man ===
On 4 July 2020, Wong joined Lee Man.

=== Eastern ===
On 4 August 2022, Wong joined Eastern. Wong said that Eastern's coach, Roberto Losada, had previously invited him to join Eastern and on seeing senior footballers, such as Yapp Hung Fai and Leung Chun Pong, who had helped young footballers progress in Eastern, decided to join the club.

=== Qingdao Hainiu ===
On 31 January 2025, Wong joined Chinese Super League club Qingdao Hainiu.

=== Kitchee ===
On 11 January 2026, Wong returned to Hong Kong and joined Kitchee.

=== Southern ===
On 1 July 2026, Wong joined Southern.

== International career ==
On 28 March 2023, Wong made his international debut for Hong Kong in a friendly match against Malaysia.

== Career statistics ==
=== Club ===
As of matches played 14 August 2025

Club	Season	League			National Cup		League Cup		Continental		Other		Total	
Club	Season	Division	Apps	Goals	Apps	Goals	Apps	Goals	Apps	Goals	Apps	Goals	Apps	Goals
South China	2017–18	Hong Kong First Division League	1	0	—		—		—		—		1	0
South China	2018–19	Hong Kong First Division League	21	3	—		—		—		—		21	3
South China	2019–20	Hong Kong First Division League	9	1	—		—		—		—		9	1
Lee Man	2020–21	Hong Kong Premier League	3	0	—		6	1	2	1	1	0	12	2
Lee Man	2021–22	Hong Kong Premier League	2	0	0	0	7	1	1	0	—		10	1
Eastern	2022–23	Hong Kong Premier League	18	2	2	0	9	3	—		3	0	32	5
Eastern	2023–24	Hong Kong Premier League	18	4	3	0	8	1	—		3	1	32	5
Eastern	2024–25	Hong Kong Premier League	9	1	—		3	1	5	0	2	0	19	2
Hong Kong Total			81	11	5	0	33	7	8	1	9	1	136	19
Qingdao Hainiu	2025	Chinese Super League	13	0	—		1	0	—		—		14	0
Career total			93	11	5	0	34	7	5	1	9	1	149	24

=== International ===
As of 11 June 2024

National team	Year	Apps	Goals
Hong Kong	2023	1	0
Hong Kong	2024	1	0
Total		2	0

#	Date	Venue	Opponent	Result	Competition
1	28 March 2023	Sultan Ibrahim Stadium, Johor, Malaysia	Malaysia	0–2	Friendly

== Honour ==
Eastern

- Hong Kong FA Cup: 2023–24
- Hong Kong Senior Shield: 2024–25

Kitchee

- Hong Kong Premier League: 2025–26
