= Leung Sing Yiu =

Hong Kong footballer

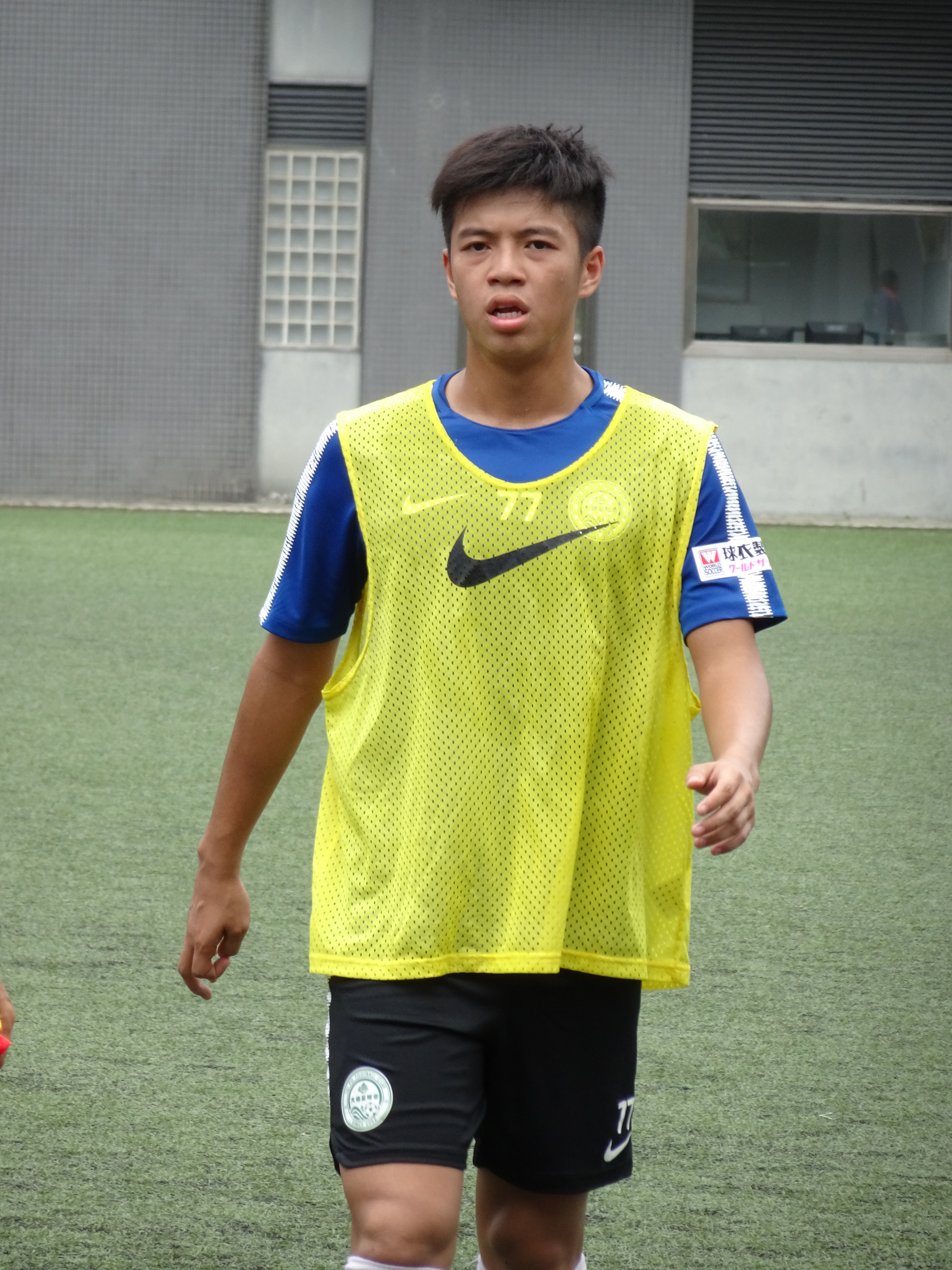

Personal information
- Full name: Leung Sing Yiu
- Date of birth: 15 November 1995 (age 30)
- Place of birth: Hong Kong
- Height: 1.72 m (5 ft 8 in)
- Positions: Left back; midfielder

Youth career
- Sham Shui Po

Senior career*
Years	Team	Apps	(Gls)
2013–2016	Sham Shui Po	36	(1)
2016–2020	Tai Po	11	(0)
2020–2024	Sham Shui Po	47	(4)
2024–2025	South China	19	(5)
2025–2026	Sham Shui Po	23	(1)
2026–	Harmony	8	(0)

International career
2017	Hong Kong U-23	1	(0)
- * Club domestic league appearances and goals as of 16 May 2026

Leung Sing Yiu (Chinese: 梁星耀; born 15 November 1995) is a former Hong Kong professional footballer who played as a left back.

== Honours ==
=== Club ===
Tai Po

- Hong Kong Premier League: 2018–19
- Hong Kong Sapling Cup: 2016–17
