= Yumemi Kanda =

Japanese footballer (born 1994)

Yumemi Kanda 神田 夢実
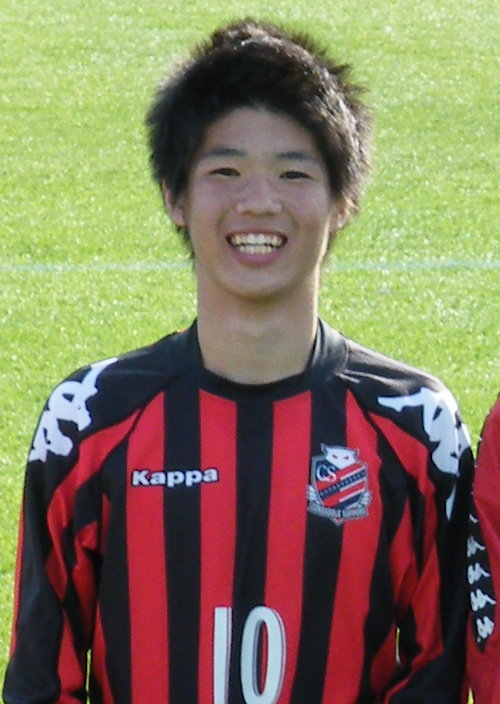
- Kanda with Consadole Sapporo (youth) in 2009

Personal information
- Full name: Yumemi Kanda
- Date of birth: 14 September 1994 (age 32)
- Place of birth: Kitahiroshima, Hokkaido, Japan
- Height: 1.70 m (5 ft 7 in)
- Position: Midfielder

Team information
- Current team: Kitchee
- Number: 11

Youth career
- –2012: Consadole Sapporo

Senior career*
Years	Team	Apps	(Gls)
2013–2016	Consadole Sapporo	17	(0)
2014	→ Sagamihara (loan)	10	(0)
2017–2019	Ehime	26	(3)
2020	Tokyo 23	9	(1)
2021–2022	YSCC	43	(4)
2023–2024	Rangers (HKG)	26	(15)
2024	Shkupi	17	(3)
2025	KF Besa Dobërdoll	12	(0)
2025–	Kitchee	20	(8)
- * Club domestic league appearances and goals as of 6 September 2026

Yumemi Kanda (神田 夢実, Kanda Yumemi; born 14 September 1994) is a Japanese professional footballer who currently plays as a midfielder for Hong Kong Premier League club Kitchee.

== Club career ==
=== Rangers ===
On 6 January 2023, Rangers announced the signing of Kanda.

Described as a "Japanese star" by the South China Morning Post, Kanda reportedly declined an offer to play for Indonesia in May 2023.

Yumemi scored 10 goals in 18 appearances for Rangers in the 2022–23 season and continued his form in the 2023–24 season as he scored 3 goals in the first 3 matches, including an AFC Champions League qualifying match.

=== Kitchee ===
On 7 July 2025, Yumemi joined Kitchee.

== International career ==
In October 2009, Kanda was selected to play for Japan U-16 national team at the 2010 AFC U-16 Championship qualification. He started in scored a goal in the match against Chinese Taipei.

== Career statistics ==
=== Club ===
Updated to 27 March 2025.

Club	Season	League		Domestic Cups		Total	
Club	Season	Apps	Goals	Apps	Goals	Apps	Goals
Consadole Sapporo	2013	4	0	3	1	7	1
SC Sagamihara	2014	10	0	-		10	0
Consadole Sapporo	2015	7	0	2	0	9	0
Consadole Sapporo	2016	6	0	2	1	8	1
Ehime FC	2017	17	1	2	0	19	1
Ehime FC	2018	7	2	-		7	2
Ehime FC	2019	2	0	-		2	0
Tokyo 23 FC	2020	9	1	-		9	1
YSCC Yokohama	2021	24	2	1	0	25	2
YSCC Yokohama	2022	7	2	-		7	2
Rangers	2022–2023	10	7	2	0	12	7
Rangers	2023–2024	16	8	5	1	21	9
FK Shkupi	2024–2025	17	3	-		17	3
KF Besa Dobërdoll	2024–2025	6	0	-		6	0
Total		145	25	17	3	162	28

== Honours ==
=== Club ===
Rangers

- Hong Kong Sapling Cup: 2023–24

Kitchee

- Hong Kong Premier League: 2025–26
