= Lam Lok Yin =

Hong Kong footballer

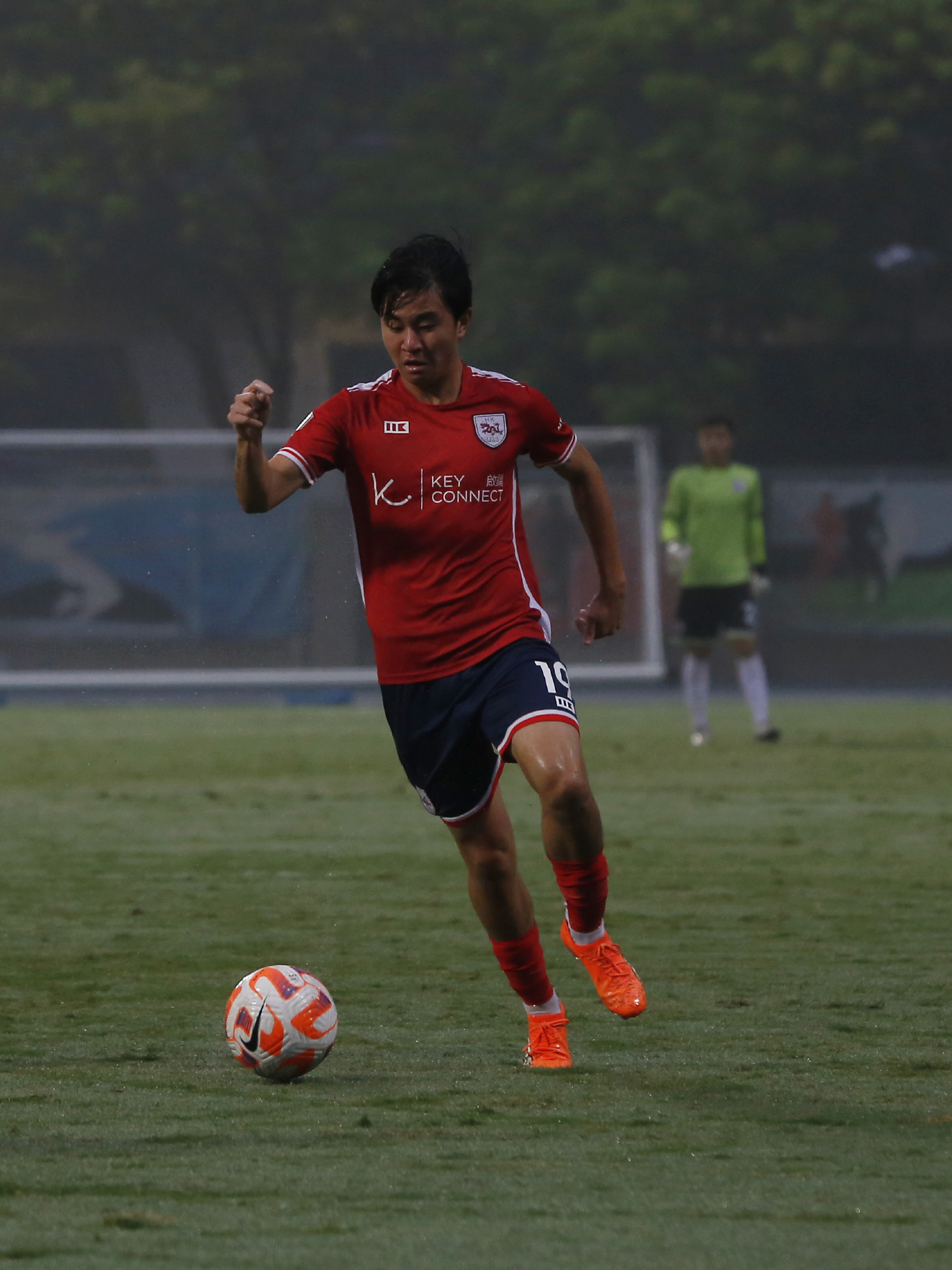

Personal information
- Full name: Jerry Lam Lok Yin
- Date of birth: 19 November 2001 (age 25)
- Place of birth: Hong Kong
- Height: 1.70 m (5 ft 7 in)
- Position: Midfielder

Team information
- Current team: Sha Tin
- Number: 19

Youth career
- 2014–2016: South China
- 2016–2018: CFCSSHK

Senior career*
Years	Team	Apps	(Gls)
2018–2019	CFCSSHK	5	(2)
2019–2021	Happy Valley	14	(0)
2021–2022	Eastern	0	(0)
2021–2022	→ HK U23 (loan)	4	(0)
2022–2023	HK U23	16	(0)
2023–2024	Resources Capital	15	(2)
2024–2026	Tai Po	4	(0)
2025–2026	→ Rangers (HKG) (loan)	10	(0)
2026–	Sha Tin	5	(0)

International career^{‡}
2023	Hong Kong U-22	4	(0)
- * Club domestic league appearances and goals as of 22 November 2026 ‡ National team caps and goals as of 9 September 2023

Jerry Lam Lok Yin (Chinese: 林樂賢; born 19 November 2001) is a Hong Kong professional footballer who currently plays as a midfielder for Hong Kong Premier League club Sha Tin.

== Club career ==
In August 2019, Lam signed his first professional contract with Hong Kong Premier League club Happy Valley.

On 9 August 2021, Lam joined Eastern. He left the club on 9 July 2022.

On 3 August 2023, Lam joined Resources Capital.

On 18 July 2024, Lam joined Tai Po.

On 23 July 2025, Lam joined Rangers on loan for the 2025–26 season.

On 8 August 2026, Lam joined Sha Tin.

== Personal life ==
Lam's elder brother, Jordan, is also a professional footballer.

== Honours ==
Tai Po

- Hong Kong Premier League: 2024–25
