= Raphaël Merkies =

French-born Hong Kong footballer (born 2002)

Raphaël Merkies 李小恆
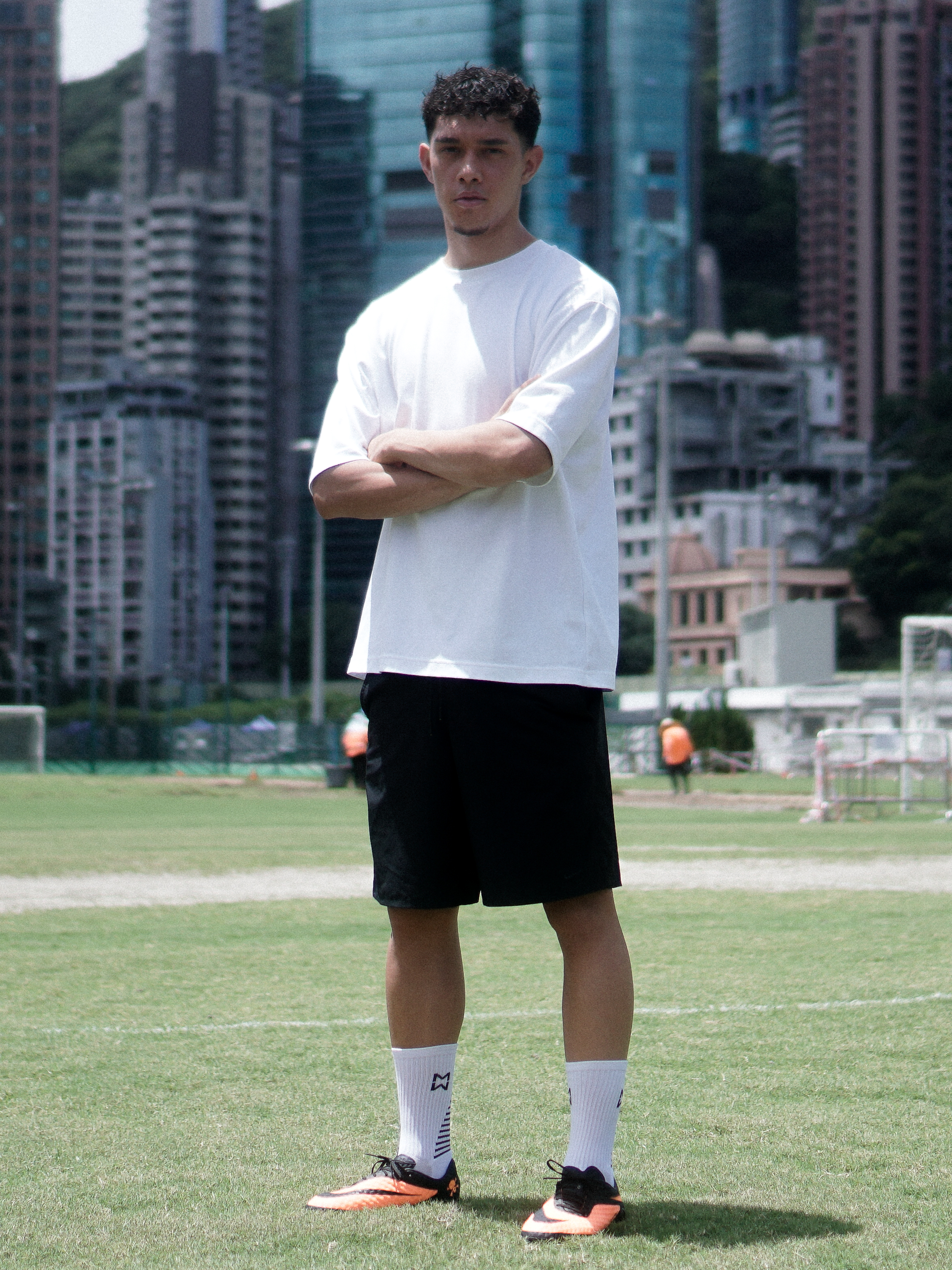

Personal information
- Full name: Raphaël Ayrton Lee Merkies
- Date of birth: 15 April 2002 (age 24)
- Place of birth: Paris, France
- Height: 1.82 m (6 ft 0 in)
- Position: Left winger

Team information
- Current team: Shandong Taishan
- Number: 17

Youth career
- 2016–2017: HKFC

Senior career*
Years	Team	Apps	(Gls)
2022–2023	HKFC	18	(1)
2023–2025	Southern	29	(6)
2025–	Shandong Taishan	31	(7)

International career^{‡}
2025–	Hong Kong	13	(5)
Medal record
Men's football
Representing Hong Kong
FIFA ASEAN Challenge Cup
Winner	2026 Hong Kong
- * Club domestic league appearances and goals as of 8 November 2026 ‡ National team caps and goals as of 3 October 2026

Raphaël Ayrton Lee Merkies (Chinese: 李小恆; born 15 April 2002) is a professional footballer who currently plays as a left winger for Chinese Super League club Shandong Taishan. Born in France, he plays for the Hong Kong national team.

== Club career ==
=== HKFC ===
Merkies began his professional career in 2022 by taking a gap year off university, having been promoted to the HKFC first team ahead of the 2022–23 Hong Kong Premier League season. The young winger made his league debut in a 1–0 victory over Sham Shui Po in the opening day fixture. Merkies then scored his first goal for the club weeks later in a Hong Kong FA Cup tie against Resources Capital.

Merkies departed the club at the end of the season.

=== Southern ===
On 10 June 2023, Merkies joined Southern, signing his first professional contract. He went on to take time off school and announced his decision to pursue football as a full-time passion prior to signing with Southern. Merkies netted his first goal for Southern in once again a Hong Kong Sapling Cup tie against his former club HKFC in a 2–2 draw away from home.

=== Shandong Taishan ===
On 14 February 2025, Merkies joined Chinese Super League club Shandong Taishan.

== International career ==
On 10 October 2024, Merkies received his HKSAR passport after staying in Hong Kong for seven years, making him eligible to represent Hong Kong internationally.

After acquiring his HKSAR passport, Merkies was named in the 52-man preliminary squad in preparation for the national team's friendly fixtures for November 2024.

On 19 March 2025, Merkies made his international debut for Hong Kong in a friendly match against Macau and scored his first international goal.

On 9 October 2025, Merkies scored a hat-trick, including a crucial goal in the eleventh minute of stoppage time against Bangladesh in a 4–3 away win in the 2027 AFC Asian Cup qualification third round.

== Personal life ==
Growing up in the suburbs of Paris, Merkies moved to Hong Kong in 2016 aged 14, enrolling in the French International School of Hong Kong. He is of Dutch and French descent and holds Hong Kong citizenship. He is also of partial Laotian Chinese descent from his maternal side of the family.

== Career statistics ==
=== Club ===
As of 6 October 2025

Appearances and goals by club, season and competition
Club	Season	League			National Cup		League Cup		Other		Total	
Club	Season	Division	Apps	Goals	Apps	Goals	Apps	Goals	Apps	Goals	Apps	Goals
HKFC	2022–23	Hong Kong Premier League	18	0	1	1	1	0	1	0	21	1
Southern	2023–25	Hong Kong Premier League	29	4	1	0	9	2	2	0	41	6
Shandong Taishan	2025–	Chinese Super League	10	3	0	0	0	0	0	0	10	3
Career total			88	8	2	1	18	2	3	0	111	11

=== International ===
As of 3 October 2026

National team	Year	Apps	Goals
Hong Kong	2025	8	5
Hong Kong	2026	5	0
Total		13	5

=== International goals ===
No.	Date	Venue	Opponent	Score	Result	Competition
1.	19 March 2025	Mong Kok Stadium, Mong Kok, Hong Kong	Macau	2–0	2–0	Friendly
2.	7 September 2025	Kanchanaburi Province Stadium, Kanchanaburi, Thailand	Fiji	3–0	8–0	2025 King's Cup
3.	9 October 2025	National Stadium, Dhaka, Bangladesh	Bangladesh	2–1	4–3	2027 AFC Asian Cup qualification
4.	9 October 2025	National Stadium, Dhaka, Bangladesh	Bangladesh	3–1	4–3	2027 AFC Asian Cup qualification
5.	9 October 2025	National Stadium, Dhaka, Bangladesh	Bangladesh	4–3	4–3	2027 AFC Asian Cup qualification

== Honours ==
Hong Kong

- FIFA ASEAN Challenge Cup: 2026
