= Ma Man Ching =

Hong Kong footballer

Personal information
- Full name: Ma Man Ching
- Date of birth: 29 May 2002 (age 24)
- Place of birth: Hong Kong
- Height: 1.71 m (5 ft 7 in)
- Position: Midfielder

Youth career
- –2016: Pegasus
- 2016–2017: Eastern
- 2017–2018: Yuen Long
- 2018–2020: Resources Capital

Senior career*
Years	Team	Apps	(Gls)
2020–2022	Resources Capital	7	(0)
2021–2022	→ HK U23 (loan)	2	(0)
2022–2023	Rangers (HKG)	0	(0)
2023–2024	Southern	2	(1)
2024–2025	Sai Kung	11	(2)
2025	Eastern District	0	(0)
2025–	Sai Kung		
- * Club domestic league appearances and goals as of 15 September 2025

Ma Man Ching (Chinese: 馬文政; born 29 May 2002) is a former Hong Kong professional footballer who played as a midfielder.

== Club career ==
On 12 June 2023, Ma joined Southern.

On 26 August 2025, Ma returned to the top flight and joined Eastern District.

== Career statistics ==
=== Club ===
As of 6 November 2021

Club	Season	League			National Cup		League Cup		Other		Total	
Club	Season	Division	Apps	Goals	Apps	Goals	Apps	Goals	Apps	Goals	Apps	Goals
Resources Capital	2020–21	Hong Kong Premier League	7 (Note: 2 appearances in the Hong Kong Premier League relegation group)	0	0	0	6 (Note: Appearances in the Sapling Cup)	0	0	0	13	0
Resources Capital	2021–22	Hong Kong Premier League	0	0	0	0	0	0	0	0	0	0
Resources Capital	Total		7	0	0	0	6	0	0	0	13	0
HK U23 (loan)	2021–22	Hong Kong Premier League	2	0	0	0	3	0	0	0	5	0
Career total			9	0	0	0	9	0	0	0	18	0
