= Nicholas Benavides =

Hong Kong footballer (born 2001)

Personal information
- Full name: Nicholas Benavides Medeiros
- Date of birth: 5 November 2001 (age 25)
- Place of birth: Tung Chung, Hong Kong
- Height: 1.73 m (5 ft 8 in)
- Positions: Left back; left winger

Youth career
- –2020: Lee Man

Senior career*
Years	Team	Apps	(Gls)
2021–2024	Sham Shui Po	50	(14)
2024–2026	Tai Po	18	(0)
2026	Foshan Nanshi	26	(3)

International career
2024–2025	Hong Kong	10	(2)
- * Club domestic league appearances and goals as of 7 November 2026

Nicholas Benavides Medeiros (Chinese: 尼高拉斯; born 5 November 2001) is a Hong Kong professional footballer who plays as a left back or a left winger.

== Club career ==
Benavides started playing football at the age of six. As a youth player, Benavides joined the youth academy of Lee Man, before getting released due to his "foreign player" status. He started his senior career with First Division club Sham Shui Po, where he gained promotion to the Hong Kong Premier League in 2022.

On 3 March 2024, Benavides scored his first career hat-trick against Rangers in a 3–1 win, which is Sham Shui Po's first win of the season. He became a free agent following Sham Shui Po's voluntary relegation back to the First Division.

In the summer of 2024, Benavides signed for Tai Po. On 1 September 2024, he debuted for the club during a 5–1 home win over Kowloon City in the 2024–25 Hong Kong Premier League.

On 15 January 2026, Tai Po announced Benavides' departure from the club.

On 2 March 2026, Benavides joined China League One club Foshan Nanshi.

== International career ==
Previously, Benavides was eligible to represent Bolivia and Chile internationally through his parents, but he relinquished his citizenship of both countries on 19 August 2023 in order to play for Hong Kong.

In October 2024, Benavides was called up to the Hong Kong national football team for the first time.

On 15 October 2024, Benavides made his international debut for Hong Kong in a 3–0 home friendly win against Cambodia.

On 8 December 2024, Benavides scored his first international goal in a 3–0 2025 EAFF E-1 Football Championship qualifier victory against Mongolia.

== Personal life ==
Benavides was born in Hong Kong to a Bolivian mother and a Chilean father. He can speak Cantonese and Spanish and is the younger brother of Hong Kong footballer Oscar Benavides.

== Career statistics ==
=== Club ===
As of 23 November 2024

Club	Season	League			National Cup		League Cup		Other		Total	
Club	Season	Division	Apps	Goals	Apps	Goals	Apps	Goals	Apps	Goals	Apps	Goals
Sham Shui Po	2020–21	Hong Kong First Division	6	4	—		—		—		6	4
Sham Shui Po	2021–22	Hong Kong First Division	9	4	—		6	3	—		15	7
Sham Shui Po	2022–23	Hong Kong Premier League	16	1	1	0	7 (Note: Appearances in the Sapling Cup)	1	—		24	2
Sham Shui Po	2023–24	Hong Kong Premier League	19	5	4	2	8	0	2 (Note: Appearances in the Hong Kong Senior Challenge Shield)	1	33	8
Sham Shui Po	Total		50	14	5	2	21	4	2	1	78	21
Tai Po	2024–25	Hong Kong Premier League	8	0	0	0	0	0	1	0	9	0
Career total			58	14	5	2	21	4	3	1	87	21

=== International ===
As of 13 November 2025

National team	Year	Apps	Goals
Hong Kong	2024	4	2
Hong Kong	2025	6	0
Total		10	2

=== International goals ===
No.	Date	Venue	Opponent	Score	Result	Competition
1.	8 December 2024	Mong Kok Stadium, Mong Kok, Hong Kong	Mongolia	3–0	3–0	2025 EAFF E-1 Football Championship qualifying
2.	17 December 2024	Hong Kong Stadium, So Kon Po, Hong Kong	Guam	2–0	5–0	2025 EAFF E-1 Football Championship qualifying

Scores and results list Hong Kong's goal tally first, score column indicates score after each Benavides goal.

== Honours ==
Tai Po

- Hong Kong Premier League: 2024–25
