= Ismael Dunga =

Kenyan footballer (born 1993)

Personal information
- Full name: Ismael Salim Dunga
- Date of birth: 24 February 1993 (age 33)
- Place of birth: Kwale, Kenya
- Height: 1.90 m (6 ft 3 in)
- Position: Forward

Senior career*
Years	Team	Apps	(Gls)
2011	Congo United		
2012	SoNy Sugar		
2012–2015	Tusker		
2016	Nakumatt		
2016–2017	Acharnaikos	7	(3)
2017	Raja Beni Mellal		
2017	City of Lusaka		
2018	NAPSA Stars		
2018–2019	Luftëtari	24	(7)
2019–2020	Tirana	14	(4)
2020–2021	Vllaznia	7	(4)
2021–2022	Sagan Tosu	9	(0)
2022	→ Kamatamare Sanuki (loan)	4	(0)
2023–2024	Sham Shui Po	16	(6)
2024	RANS Nusantara	7	(2)
2025	Kamatamare Sanuki	5	(0)
2025	Kelantan Red Warrior	1	(0)
- * Club domestic league appearances and goals as of 3 May 2025

Ismael Salim Dunga (born 24 February 1993) is a Kenyan professional footballer who plays as a forward.

== Club career ==
Dunga joined Albanian side Luftëtari in 2018.

On 29 June 2023, Dunga joined Hong Kong Premier League club Sham Shui Po.

== Career statistics ==
=== Club ===
As of 8 November 2024.

Club	Season	League			Cup		Continental		Other		Total	
Club	Season	Division	Apps	Goals	Apps	Goals	Apps	Goals	Apps	Goals	Apps	Goals
Acharnaikos	2016–17	Football League	7	3	0	0	–		0	0	7	3
Luftëtari Gjirokastër	2018–19	Albanian Superliga	24	7	5 (Note: Appearances in the Albanian Cup)	3	–		0	0	29	10
Tirana	2019–20	Albanian Superliga	14	4	4	0	–		0	0	18	4
Vllaznia	2020–21	Albanian Superliga	7	4	2	1	–		0	0	9	5
Sagan Tosu	2021	J1 League	9	0	2	0	–		4	0	15	0
Kamatamare Sanuki	2022	J3 League	4	0	0	0	–		0	0	4	0
Sham Shui Po	2023–24	Hong Kong Premier League	16	6	3	2	–		1	0	20	8
RANS Nusantara	2024–25	Liga 2	7	2	0	0	–		0	0	7	2
Career total			88	26	16	6	0	0	5	0	109	32

== Honours ==
Tirana

- Albanian Superliga: 2019–20
