= Jim Liddell =

English/Scottish footballer

Jim Liddell was an English-Scottish footballer who played in the Hong Kong First Division League for Hong Kong Rangers FC as a goalkeeper between 1973 and 1976.
