= Leung Wai Fung =

Hong Kong footballer (born 2000)

Personal information
- Full name: Derek Leung Wai Fung
- Date of birth: 22 December 2000 (age 25)
- Place of birth: Hong Kong
- Height: 1.80 m (5 ft 11 in)
- Position: Centre back

Team information
- Current team: Rangers (HKG)
- Number: 4

Youth career
- –2018: Pegasus

Senior career*
Years	Team	Apps	(Gls)
2018–2022	Yuen Long	23	(0)
2022–2024	HK U23	33	(2)
2024–	Rangers (HKG)	48	(2)
- * Club domestic league appearances and goals as of 7 November 2026

Derek Leung Wai Fung (Chinese: 梁煒烽; born 22 December 2000) is a Hong Kong professional footballer who currently plays as a centre back for Hong Kong Premier League club Rangers.

== Club career ==
On 3 July 2024, Leung joined Rangers.

== Career statistics ==
=== Club ===
As of 29 March 2019.

Club	Season	League			National Cup		League Cup		Continental		Other		Total	
Club	Season	Division	Apps	Goals	Apps	Goals	Apps	Goals	Apps	Goals	Apps	Goals	Apps	Goals
Yuen Long	2018–19	Hong Kong Premier League	1	0	0	0	0	0	0	0	0	0	1	0
Career total			1	0	0	0	0	0	0	0	0	0	1	0
