= Jordon Brown (footballer, born 1994) =

English-born Hong Kong footballer (born 1994)

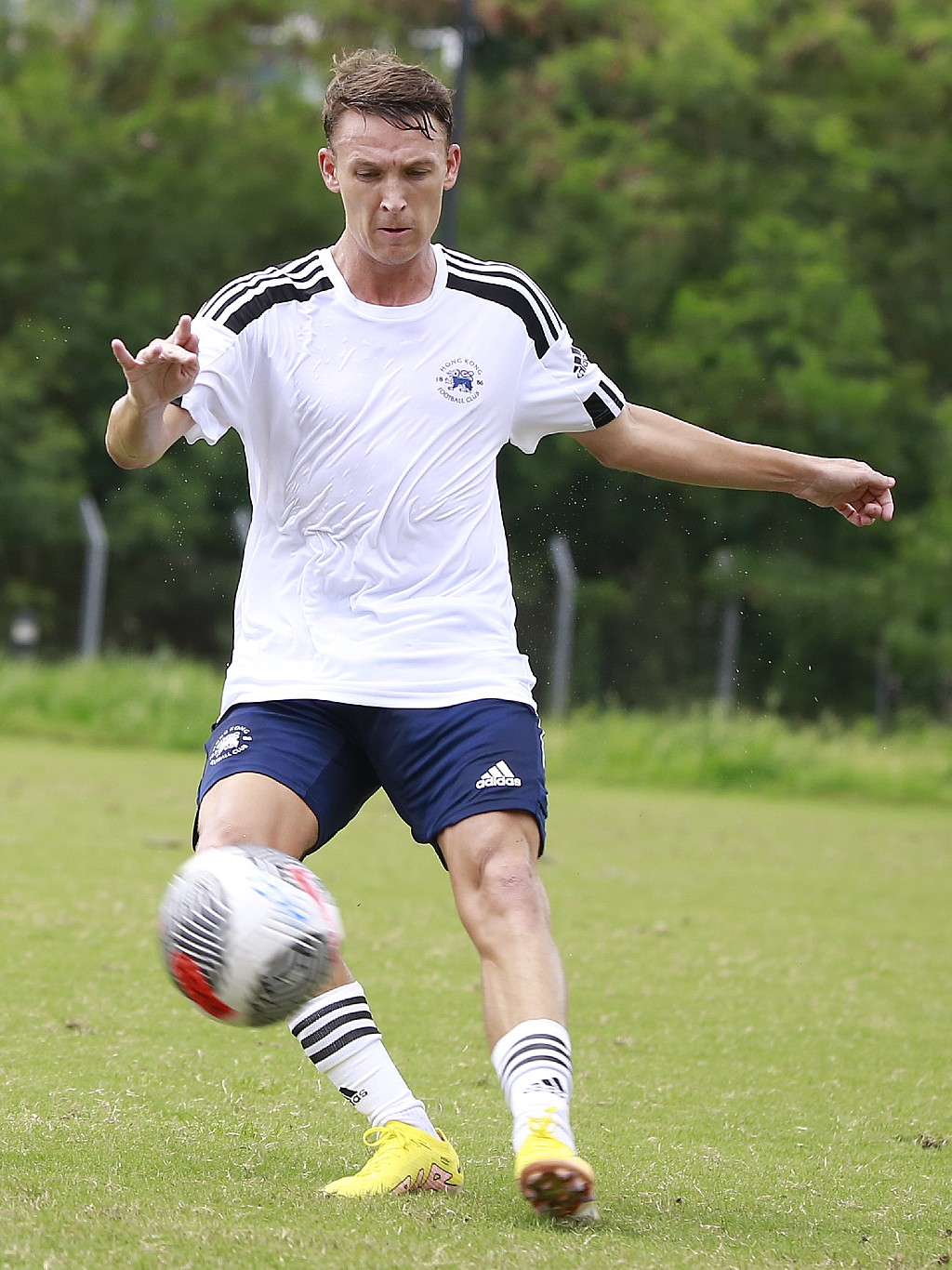

Personal information
- Full name: Jordon Graham John Brown
- Date of birth: 10 February 1994 (age 32)
- Place of birth: England
- Height: 1.71 m (5 ft 7 in)
- Position: Left back

Youth career
- Northampton Town

Senior career*
Years	Team	Apps	(Gls)
2013–2016	HKFC	42	(5)
2017–2018	Resources Capital	23	(1)
2019	HKFC	12	(1)
2019–2022	Resources Capital	24	(6)
2022–2024	Kitchee	4	(0)
2023–2024	→ HKFC (loan)	14	(1)
2024–2025	Eastern District	4	(1)
2025–	Resources Capital	1	(1)
- * Club domestic league appearances and goals

Jordon Graham John Brown (born 10 February 1994) is a former professional footballer who played as a left back. Born in England, he acquired his HKSAR passport in November 2022.

== Club career ==
On 12 July 2022, it was announced that Brown had joined Kitchee.

On 29 July 2023, Brown was loaned to HKFC.

== International career ==
On 19 November 2022, Brown officially announced that he had received a HKSAR passport after giving up his British passport, making him eligible to represent Hong Kong internationally.

== Career statistics ==
=== Club ===
As of 24 January 2021.

Club	Season	League			National Cup		League Cup		Continental		Other		Total	
Club	Season	Division	Apps	Goals	Apps	Goals	Apps	Goals	Apps	Goals	Apps	Goals	Apps	Goals
HKFC	2013–14	Hong Kong Second Division	3	0	0	0	0	0	0	0	0	0	3	0
HKFC	2014–15	Hong Kong First Division	9	4	0	0	0	0	0	0	0	0	9	4
HKFC	2015–16	Hong Kong First Division	20	1	1 (Note: HKFAC)	0	0	0	0	0	0	0	21	1
HKFC	Total		32	5	1	0	0	0	0	0	0	0	33	5
Resources Capital	2018–19	Hong Kong First Division	15	1	0	0	0	0	0	0	0	0	15	1
Resources Capital	2020–21	Hong Kong Premier League	1	0	0	0	4 (Note: Appearances in the Hong Kong Sapling Cup)	0	0	0	0	0	5	0
Resources Capital	Total		16	1	0	0	4	0	0	0	0	0	20	1
Career total			48	6	1	0	4	0	0	0	0	0	53	6

== Honours ==
Kitchee

- Hong Kong Premier League: 2022–23
- Hong Kong Senior Challenge Shield: 2022–23
- Hong Kong FA Cup: 2022–23
