= Jordan Lam =

Hong Kong footballer (born 1999)

Jordan Lam 林樂勤
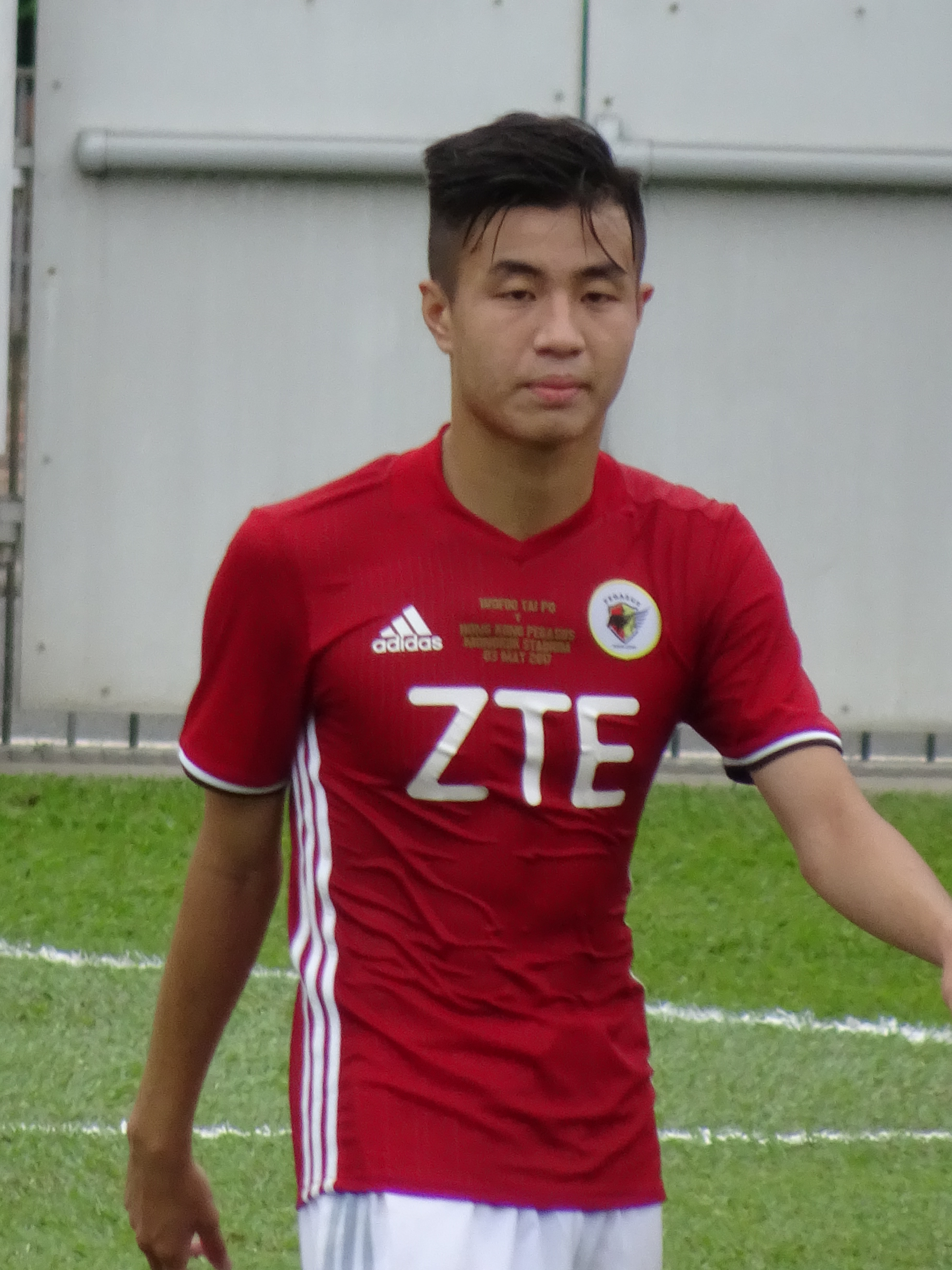
- Lam with Pegasus in 2017

Personal information
- Full name: Jordan Lam Lok Kan
- Date of birth: 2 February 1999 (age 27)
- Place of birth: Monterey, California, United States
- Height: 1.76 m (5 ft 9 in)
- Positions: Left winger; left back

Team information
- Current team: Kitchee
- Number: 27

Youth career
- 2005–2015: CFCSSHK
- 2016–2017: Bury

Senior career*
Years	Team	Apps	(Gls)
2017–2018	Pegasus	12	(2)
2018–2019	Dreams FC	15	(1)
2019–2020	R&F	4	(1)
2020–2021	Southern	12	(0)
2021–2023	Resources Capital	17	(0)
2023–2024	North District	20	(3)
2024–	Kitchee	46	(2)

International career^{‡}
2014–2016	Hong Kong U16	2	(0)
2015–2017	Hong Kong U19	3	(0)
2017–2021	Hong Kong U22	4	(2)
2024–	Hong Kong	3	(0)
- * Club domestic league appearances and goals as of 21 November 2026 ‡ National team caps and goals as of 9 June 2026

Jordan Lam Lok Kan (Chinese: 林樂勤; born 2 February 1999) is a professional footballer who currently plays as a left winger or a left back for Hong Kong Premier League club Kitchee. Born in the United States, he represents the Hong Kong national team.

== Early life ==
Lam was born in Monterey, California, to parents from Hong Kong. His family moved to Temple City when he was several months old. Due to his father's need to frequently travel between Hong Kong and Los Angeles for work, the family decided to sell their house in Temple City and move back to Hong Kong after a few years.

== Club career ==
=== Youth career ===
When Lam was seven, he and his brother entered and won a 2 on 2 football tournament organized by the local YMCA. At age 10, he joined a football academy run by Hong Kong football star Leslie Santos, which would later become Chelsea Soccer School. During his time at Chelsea Soccer School, he trained under the tutelage of Shum Kwok Pui, competed in various Hong Kong youth tournaments and many overseas showcase tournaments.

In 2014, Lam led Diocesan Boys' School to the Hong Kong Inter-School Football Competition championship and was named season MVP. His performances soon attracted the attention of scouts and he was offered opportunities to join the youth teams of Guangzhou Evergrande and Shandong Luneng. However, his family did not want to relocate to the Mainland as they felt that the standard of players whom Lam would train against were similar to those in Hong Kong.

On 21 June 2015, Lam led the South China U-16 team to a victory over the Kitchee U-16's in the HKFA U-16 Cup Final. Eastern expressed an interest in signing Lam to a professional contract following the match but ultimately were unable to come to terms.

In March 2016, Lam and his Chelsea School teammate Tse Ka Wing travelled to England to seek out an opportunity to join the youth academy of an English side. The two trialled at Leicester City but left because they felt that it would be too difficult to break into the first team. The two later trialled at Bury for six weeks and decided to join their academy. However, their time at Bury was marred by a delay in the processing of their international clearance. As a result, the pair could not receive work permits in order to play in the Football League Youth Alliance with the rest of the squad. Facing long odds of ever receiving a work permit, Lam returned to Hong Kong.

=== Pegasus ===
On 10 February 2017, Lam signed his first professional contract with Pegasus. He made his debut on 1 April, creating two assists in a 5–3 loss to Eastern.

On 12 June 2018, Lam stated that he would leave Pegasus in search of greater playing opportunities elsewhere.

=== Dreams FC ===
Following his departure, Lam joined Dreams FC on 11 July 2018.

=== R&F ===
On 19 June 2019, R&F head coach Yeung Ching Kwong revealed that Lam would join the club. He was officially announced as an R&F player on 9 July 2019.

During preseason training in Portugal, Lam injured his anterior cruciate ligament, necessitating a long layoff to recover. On 14 October 2020, Lam left the club after his club's withdrawal from the HKPL in the new season.

=== Southern ===
On 25 November 2020, Lam signed for Southern.

=== Resources Capital ===
On 21 August 2021, Lam joined Resources Capital.

=== North District ===
On 17 July 2023, Lam joined North District.

=== Kitchee ===
On 27 June 2024, Kitchee president Ken Ng announced that the club had signed Lam.

On 2 July 2024, Lam officially joined Kitchee.

== International career ==
In October 2014, Lam received his first call up to the Hong Kong U-16's as a 15 year old. Head coach Yeung Ching Kwong selected him ahead of the 2014 AFC U-16 Championship despite being a year younger than some of his teammates. He made two appearances off the bench for Hong Kong but the team did not advance past the group stage.

In May 2017, Lam was called into the Hong Kong U-23's squad which finished as runners up in the HKFC Soccer Sevens tournament. In July 2017, he was called into the full squad for U-23's squad for a tournament in Myanmar and 2018 AFC U-23 Championship qualification.

On 26 March 2024, Lam made his debut for the senior Hong Kong national team in a World Cup qualifier against Uzbekistan.

== Personal life ==
Lam's younger brother, Jerry, is also a professional footballer.

== Career statistics ==
=== International ===
As of 9 June 2026

National team	Year	Apps	Goals
Hong Kong	2024	1	0
Hong Kong	2025	0	0
Hong Kong	2026	2	0
Total		3	0

#	Date	Venue	Opponent	Result	Competition
1	26 March 2024	Milliy Stadium, Tashkent, Uzbekistan	Uzbekistan	0–3	2026 FIFA World Cup qualification – AFC second round

== Honours ==
Kitchee

- Hong Kong Premier League: 2025–26
