= Tamirlan Kozubayev =

Kyrgyzstani footballer (born 1994)

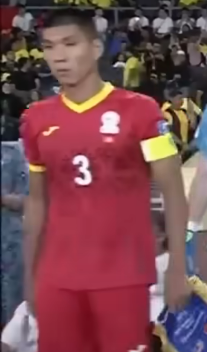
- Kozubayev playing for Kyrgyzstan in 2023

Personal information
- Full name: Tamirlan Omuraliyevich Kozubayev
- Date of birth: 1 July 1994 (age 32)
- Place of birth: Kara-Suu, Kyrgyzstan
- Height: 1.86 m (6 ft 1 in)
- Position: Centre-back

Team information
- Current team: Persita Tangerang
- Number: 5

Senior career*
Years	Team	Apps	(Gls)
2012–2013	Dordoi Bishkek		
2013–2014	Ala-Too Naryn		
2014	Šiauliai	17	(0)
2015	Alga Bishkek	5	(1)
2015	Klaipėdos Granitas	11	(0)
2016	Jagodina	0	(0)
2016–2019	Dordoi Bishkek		
2019–2020	PKNS	21	(3)
2020–2021	Persita Tangerang	3	(0)
2021	Shinnik Yaroslavl	9	(1)
2021	Turan	1	(0)
2022–2024	Eastern	42	(6)
2025–	Persita Tangerang	52	(0)

International career^{‡}
2013–2016	Kyrgyzstan U21	14	(2)
2018	Kyrgyzstan U23	3	(0)
2015–	Kyrgyzstan	68	(3)
- * Club domestic league appearances and goals as of 31 October 2026 ‡ National team caps and goals as of 5 September 2025

Tamirlan Omuraliyevich Kozubayev (Kyrgyz: Тамирлан Козубаев; Russian: Тамирлан Омуралиевич Козубаев; born 1 July 1994) is a Kyrgyzstani professional footballer who plays as a centre-back for Super League club Persita Tangerang and the Kyrgyzstan national team.

== Club career ==
Kozubayev previously played for FK Šiauliai and FK Granitas in Lithuanian A Lyga. On the last day of the 2015–16, winter transfers window, Kozubayev signed with the Serbian club FK Jagodina. After his Jagodina contract expired, Kozubayev signed a contract with Kyrgyz side Dordoi Bishkek on 17 August 2016. On 28 January 2019, Dordoi Bishkek confirmed that Kozubayev had left the club after his contract had expired.

On 4 March 2022, Kozubayev signed for Hong Kong Premier League club Eastern.

== International career ==
Kozubayev made his debut for Kyrgyzstan National Football Team in the 2018 FIFA World Cup Qualifiers, on 13 October 2015 against Bangladesh.

== Career statistics ==
=== International ===
Statistics accurate as of match played 9 January 2024

Kyrgyzstan national team
Year	Apps	Goals
2015	3	0
2016	5	1
2017	3	0
2018	6	0
2019	11	1
2021	5	0
2022	4	0
2023	12	0
2024	1	0
Total	50	2

=== International goals ===
Scores and results list Kyrgyzstan's goal tally first.

No.	Date	Venue	Opponent	Score	Result	Competition
1.	11 October 2016	Dolen Omurzakov Stadium, Bishkek, Kyrgyzstan	Turkmenistan	1–0	1–0	Friendly
2.	19 November 2019	Dolen Omurzakov Stadium, Bishkek, Kyrgyzstan	Tajikistan	1–1	1–1	2022 FIFA World Cup qualification
3.	2 September 2025	JAR Stadium, Tashkent, Uzbekistan	Oman	1–0	1–2	2025 CAFA Nations Cup

== Honours ==
Dordoi Bishkek

- Kyrgyz Premier League: 2018
- Kyrgyzstan Cup: 2018

Eastern

- Hong Kong FA Cup: 2023–24
