= Chiu Chung Man =

Association football player

Personal information
- Full name: Chiu Chung Man
- Date of birth: 7 October 1969 (age 57)
- Place of birth: Hong Kong
- Height: 1.70 m (5 ft 7 in)
- Position: Midfielder

Senior career*
Years	Team	Apps	(Gls)
1987–1988	May Ching		
1988–1994	South China		
1994–1997	Golden		
1997	Sing Tao		
1998–2001	Yee Hope		
2001–2003	Double Flower		

International career
1989–1991	Hong Kong U-23		
1990–1997	Hong Kong	9	(0)

Managerial career
- 2007–2008: South China (youth coach)
- 2008–2009: Mutual (assistant coach)
- 2011–2012: Sun Hei (assistant coach)
- 2012–2013: Sun Hei
- 2014–2016: Wong Tai Sin
- 2016–2017: Biu Chun Glory Sky
- 2017–2019: Dreams FC (technical director)
- 2019–2023: Rangers
- 2023–2024: Rangers (assistant coach)
- * Club domestic league appearances and goals

Chiu Chung Man (Chinese: 招重文; born 7 October 1969) is a Hong Kong football manager and former professional footballer who played as a midfielder.

== Playing career ==
Chiu started his career with Hong Kong side May Ching.

In 1988, he signed for South China in the Hong Kong top flight, helping them win 3 consecutive league titles.

In 1997, he signed for Sing Tao.

== Managerial career ==
In 2012, Chiu was appointed the head coach of Hong Kong top flight club Sun Hei.

In 2014, he was appointed the head coach of the football club Wong Tai Sin.

In 2016, he was appointed the head coach of Biu Chun Glory Sky.

In 2019, he was appointed the head coach of Rangers.
