= Sham Shui Po Sports Ground =

Sports ground in Kowloon, Hong Kong

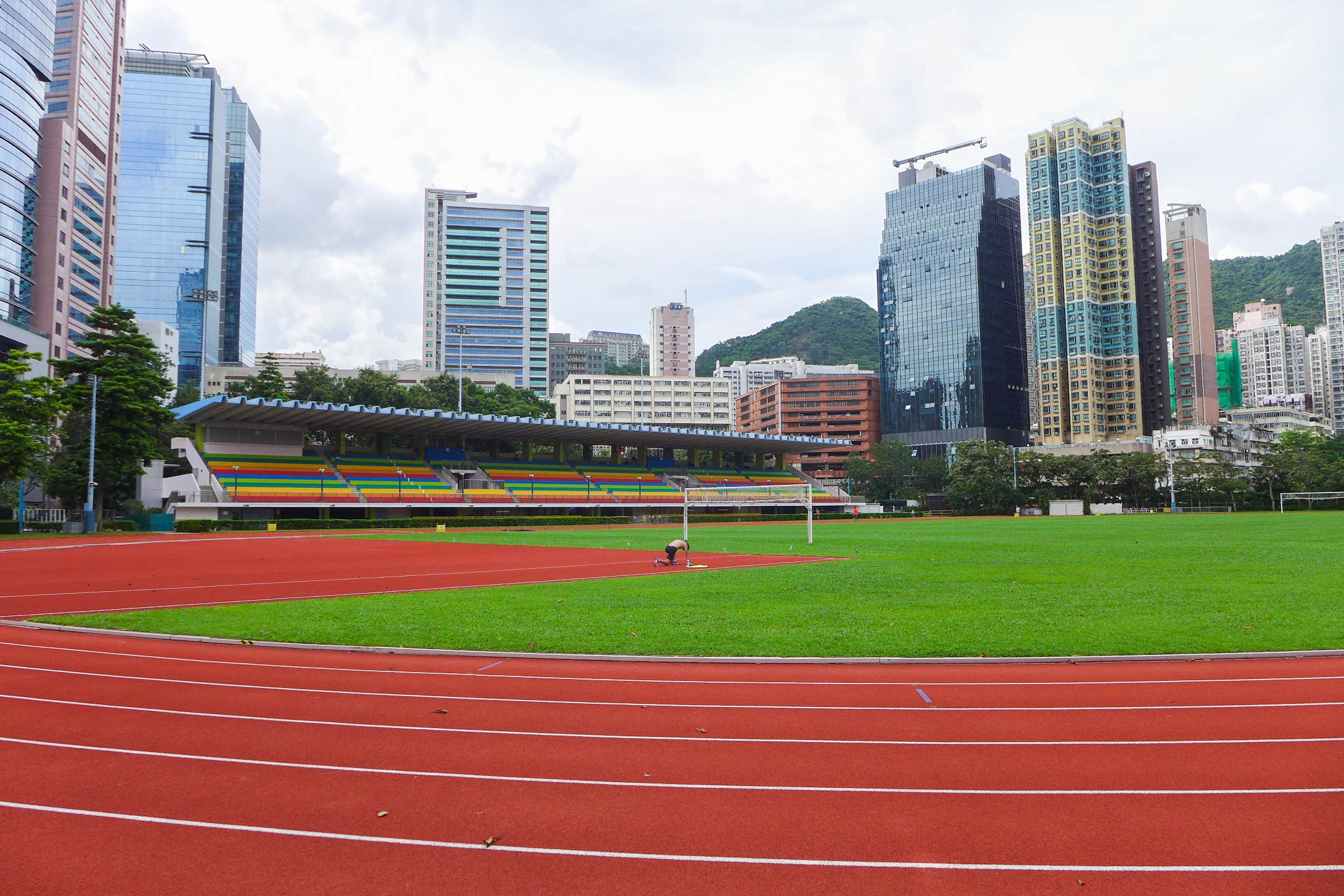
- Sham Shui Po Sports Ground in July 2017
- Interactive map of Sham Shui Po Sports Ground
- Address: 3 Hing Wah Street, Cheung Sha Wan, Kowloon, Hong Kong
- Coordinates: 22.337068°N 114.152142°E
- Owner: Hong Kong Government
- Operator: Leisure and Cultural Services Department
- Capacity: 2,194
- Surface: Grass
- Record attendance: 2,185 (Sham Shui Po vs South China, 18 September 2011)
- Pitch size: 100 x 64 metres (110 x 70 yards)
- Public transit: Cheung Sha Wan station

Construction
- Opened: 9 January 1988; 38 years ago

Tenants
- Sham Shui Po (2011–12, 2022–24); Lee Man (2019–20); Hoi King (2018–19); Rangers (2009–15, 2017–18); Happy Valley (2020–2021); Kowloon City (2024–2026)

Sham Shui Po Sports Ground (Chinese: 深水埗運動場) is public sports ground located in Cheung Sha Wan, Kowloon, Hong Kong. It opened on 9 January 1988.

== Facilities ==
- 1 all-weather, international standard 400-metre running track (8 lanes)
- 1 grass pitch with flood lights
- 1 spectator stand with 2,194 seats
- 1 car park (accommodates 12 private cars and 3 coaches)
- 1 fast food kiosk

== Football ==
Fourway Athletics will use the sports ground as the home stadium in 2009–10 season.

In the 2011–12 Hong Kong First Division League season, Sham Shui Po uses the sports ground for all its home matches. On 18 September 2011, the sports ground registered its first ever full house for a Hong Kong First Division League match, but Sham Shui Po was defeated by visitors South China by 0-2.

In 2017–18, Rangers moved their home matches back to Sham Shui Po Sports Ground.

The following season, due to Rangers' relegation, Hoi King became the new tenant of the ground.

In 2019–20, due to Eastern's selection of Tseung Kwan O Sports Ground as their home stadium, Lee Man moved to Sham Shui Po Sports Ground.

== 1999 Standard Chartered Hong Kong Marathon ==
In 1999, the Standard Chartered Hong Kong Marathon started in Central District on Hong Kong Island on Chater Road and finished at Sham Shui Po Sports Ground.
