= Kotaro Umeda =

Japanese footballer

Personal information
- Date of birth: 15 February 1998 (age 28)
- Place of birth: Tokyo, Japan
- Height: 1.85 m (6 ft 1 in)
- Position: Defender

Team information
- Current team: Michigan Stars
- Number: 47

Youth career
- 2005–2013: Cleveland Cobras
- 2013–2014: Cleveland Soccer Academy
- 2014–2016: Cleveland Internationals

College career
Years	Team	Apps	(Gls)
2016–2017	Louisville Cardinals	2	(0)
2018	Akron Zips	2	(0)

Senior career*
Years	Team	Apps	(Gls)
2017	AFC Cleveland		
2018	Cleveland	4	(1)
2019	Joinville	0	(0)
2019–2020	GDU Torcatense	7	(0)
2020–2021	Pevidém		
2020	Pevidém B		
2021	Joinville	0	(0)
2021	→ Blumenau (loan)	6	(0)
2022	Tormenta	9	(0)
2023	Michigan Stars	22	(0)
2024	Resources Capital	11	(0)
2024–	Michigan Stars	3	(0)
- * Club domestic league appearances and goals as of 31 October 2024

Kotaro Umeda (梅田小太郎, Umeda Kotaro; born 15 February 1998) is a Japanese professional footballer who currently plays as a defender for Michigan Stars in the National Independent Soccer Association.

Umeda was born in Tokyo, Japan but grew up in the United States, where he played several championships before turning professional in Brazil, playing for Joinville Esporte Clube.

== Early life ==
Born in Tokyo, Japan, Umeda and his family moved to the United States when he was six years old. At the age of nine, he was spotted by Kia Zolgharnain, who helped his evolution into a professional footballer. Umeda is a Mayfield High School alumni and played NCAA Division I soccer at the University of Louisville before becoming a pro in Brazil.

Umeda played youth football in the United States. He was a member of the Internationals Soccer Club and the Cleveland Soccer Academy in Cleveland.

== Career ==
=== Joinville ===
In 2019, Umeda joined Joinville Esporte Clube and competed in the Brazilian Championship. He is the first-ever Asian athlete to represent Joinville.

After the 2019 season, Umeda made his debut in the Portuguese Championship. He returned to Joinville in May 2021.

Umeda became the brand ambassador for Joinville Esporte Clube and helped to benefit Joinville, according to football director Leo Roesler. The partnership intends to expand the JEC brand's international reach in the Asian market.

=== Portugal ===
In the Campeonato de Portugal, Umeda made his debut in November 2019. He joined Pevidém in 2020 and made an appearance for their "B" team, in the Divisão de Honra AF Braga, on 11 August.

=== Resources Capital ===
On 10 January 2024, Umeda joined Hong Kong Premier League club Resources Capital.

== Personal life ==
Umeda published his first book, I'm With You, in English in 2019. He also published the book in Portuguese. Umeda promotes help to needy families while sharing football responsibilities with Joinville Esporte Clube.

Umeda became an ambassador for the United Way of Greater Cleveland in 2020, an endowment that supports low-income families and fights prejudice.

Umeda is a brand ambassador for Obsesh, which is an online platform that communicates directly with fans and supporters.

In 2026, Umeda became a founding member of the Pro Athlete Community (PAC) Speakers Bureau

== Career statistics ==
As of 20 August 2022

Appearances and goals by club, season and competition
Club	Season	League			State League		Cup (Note: Appearance in the Taça da AF Braga)		Continental		Other		Total	
Club	Season	Division	Apps	Goals	Apps	Goals	Apps	Goals	Apps	Goals	Apps	Goals	Apps	Goals
AFC Cleveland	2017	NPSL	2+	0+	—		0	0	—		—		2+	0+
Cleveland SC	2018	NPSL	4	1	—		—		—		0	0	4	1
Joinville	2019	Série D	0	0	0	0	0	0	—		0	0	0	0
Torcatense	2019–20	Pró-Nacional AF Braga	7	0	—		1	0	—		—		8	0
Pevidém	2020–21	Campeonato de Portugal			—		0	0	—		—			
Pevidém B	2020–21	Divisão de Honra AF Braga	1+	0+	—		—		—		—		1+	0+
Joinville	2021	Série D	0	0	0	0	0	0	—		0	0	0	0
Blumenau (loan)	2021	Campeonato Catarinense Série C	—		6	0	—		—		—		6	0
Tormenta FC	2022	USL League One	9	0	—		0	0	—		0	0	9	0
Career total			23+	1+	6	0	1	0	0	0	0	0	30+	1+
