= Nassam Ibrahim =

Ghanaian footballer

Personal information
- Full name: Yakubu Nassam Ibrahim
- Date of birth: 18 February 1997 (age 29)
- Place of birth: Bimbilla, Ghana
- Height: 1.88 m (6 ft 2 in)
- Position: Winger

Team information
- Current team: Rangers (HKG)
- Number: 14

Youth career
- Red Bull Ghana
- 2012–2016: Growlamp Soccer Academy

Senior career*
Years	Team	Apps	(Gls)
2017–2018	Pofmade FC		
2019–2023	Ococias Kyoto	44	(13)
2023–2024	Rangers (HKG)	25	(16)
2024	Suzhou Dongwu	13	(2)
2025–	Rangers (HKG)	39	(16)

International career
2018	Ghana U23	1	(1)
- * Club domestic league appearances and goals as of 21 November 2026

Yakubu Nassam Ibrahim (born 18 February 1997) is a Ghanaian professional footballer who currently plays as a winger for Hong Kong Premier League club Rangers.

== Club career ==
Ibrahim was first spotted by scouts from Red Bull Ghana in an inter-school competition, where he started his football.

Ibrahim joined Growlamp Soccer Academy, a football academy in his native Ghana, when he was in junior high school. He then started playing professionally with Pofmade FC after he graduated from high school.

Ibrahim was one of the three Ghanaians Ococias Kyoto signed on 22 January 2019. On 14 April, Ibrahim scored in the season opener against St Andrew's FC, helping Kyoto to a 5–1 win.

On 10 February 2020, Ibrahim signed a one-year contract extension with Ococias Kyoto.

On 25 February 2021, Ococias Kyoto announced that they had extended Ibrahim's contract for one year.

On 9 February 2022, Ibrahim renewed his contract with Ococias Kyoto for another season. On 1 December, Ococias Kyoto announced that Ibrahim would leave at the end of the 2022 season when his contract expires.

On 21 February 2023, Ibrahim signed for Hong Kong Premier League club Rangers.

On 17 January 2025, Ibrahim returned Rangers after spending half season in Suzhou Dongwu.

== International career ==
On 18 December 2018, Ibrahim played his only match for Ghana U23, where they beat Togo 5–1 in the 2019 U-23 Africa Cup of Nations qualifiers, with Ibrahim scoring a goal in the process.

== Honours ==
=== Club ===
Rangers

- Hong Kong Sapling Cup: 2023–24
