= Sham Shui Po SA =

Sham Shui Po
- Full name: Sham Shui Po Sports Association
- Founded: 2002; 24 years ago
- Ground: Sham Shui Po Sports Ground
- Capacity: 2,194
- Chairman: Lo Wing Man
- Head coach: Oscar Benavides
- League: Hong Kong First Division
- 2025–26: First Division, 4th of 14
- Website: www.facebook.com/hksspfc
Home colours	Away colours

Sham Shui Po Sports Association (Chinese: 深水埗體育會) is a Hong Kong professional football club based in Sham Shui Po District which currently competes in the Hong Kong First Division.

== History ==
Sham Shui Po began fielding a football team in the Hong Kong football league system in 2002 as part of a Hong Kong Football Association initiative to involve district representative teams. Sham Shui Po were part of a group of 11 districts which participated in the inaugural season of this project.

In the 2010–11 season, Sham Shui Po achieved promotion to the Hong Kong Second Division.

In the 2011–12 season, the club was promoted to the top-tier Hong Kong First Division for the first time in the club's history after winning the Second Division league title, but was relegated after finishing bottom out of 10 teams.

In July 2022, Sham Shui Po accepted HKFA's invitation to be promoted to the 2022–23 Hong Kong Premier League.

In the 2023–24 season, Sham Shui Po advanced to the final of the Hong Kong FA Cup for the first time in their club history, but was beaten by Eastern in the final and finished runners up eventually.

On 21 June 2024, the club announced that they would self-relegate into the First Division.

In the 2025-26 season under Wong Tsz Fung, Sham Shui Po finished 4th in the First Division and reached the quarter-finals of the Hong Kong FA Cup Junior Division. Wellingsson Souza was the top goalscorer with 9 goals.

On 17 October 2026, Lee Kwan Hap was sacked as manager of the club and was replaced by Oscar Benavides, father of former Sham Shui Po players Nicholas Benavides and Oscar Benavides Jr.

== Retired numbers ==
Note: Flags indicate national team as defined under FIFA eligibility rules; some limited exceptions apply. Players may hold more than one non-FIFA nationality.

No.	Pos.	Nation	Player
83	MF	HKG	Wong Chun Hin (posthumous)

== Season-to-season record ==
Season	Tier	Division	Teams	Position	Home stadium	Attendance/G	FA Cup	Senior Shield	League Cup	Sapling Cup
2002–03	3	Third District Division	13				Did not enter	Did not enter	Did not enter	Not held
2003–04	3	Third District Division		3			Did not enter	Did not enter	Did not enter	Not held
2004–05	3	Third District Division		3			Did not enter	Did not enter	Did not enter	Not held
2005–06	3	Third District Division	16	3			Did not enter	Did not enter	Did not enter	Not held
2006–07	3	Third District Division	17	5			Did not enter	Did not enter	Did not enter	Not held
2007–08	3	Third District Division	16	7			Did not enter	Did not enter	Did not enter	Not held
2008–09	3	Third District Division	15	3			First Round	Did not enter	Did not enter	Not held
2009–10	3	Third District Division	14	1			Did not enter	Did not enter	Not held	Not held
2010–11	2	Second Division	12	1			Did not enter	Did not enter	Did not enter	Not held
2011–12	1	First Division	10	10	Sham Shui Po Sports Ground	1,006	Semi-finals	Quarter-finals	Quarter-finals	Not held
2012–13	2	Second Division	11	11			Did not enter	Did not enter	Not held	Not held
2013–14	3	Third Division	14	5			Did not enter	Did not enter	Not held	Not held
2014–15	3	Second Division	12	7			Did not enter	Did not enter	Did not enter	Not held
2015–16	3	Second Division	12	4			Did not enter	Did not enter	Did not enter	Did not enter
2016–17	3	Second Division	12	7			Did not enter	Did not enter	Defunct	Did not enter
2017–18	3	Second Division	14	6			Did not enter	Did not enter	Defunct	Did not enter
2018–19	3	Second Division	14	2			Did not enter	Did not enter	Defunct	Did not enter
2019–20	2	First Division	14	Cancelled			Did not enter	Did not enter	Defunct	Did not enter
2020–21	2	First Division	14	3			Cancelled due to COVID-19 pandemic		Defunct	Did not enter
2021–22	2	First Division	14	Cancelled			Cancelled due to COVID-19 pandemic		Defunct	Cancelled due to COVID-19 pandemic
2022–23	1	Premier League	10	9	Sham Shui Po Sports Ground	751	Quarter-finals	Quarter-finals	Defunct	Group Stage
2023–24	1	Premier League	11	9	Sham Shui Po Sports Ground	629	Runners-up	Quarter-finals	Defunct	Group Stage
2024-25	2	First Division	13	11	Kowloon Tsai Park #1		Did not enter	Did not enter	Defunct	Did not enter
2025-26	2	First Division	14	4	Po Kong Village Road Park #1		Did not enter	Did not enter	Defunct	Did not enter

Note:

1st or Champions 2nd or Runners-up 3rd place Promotion Relegation

== Honours ==
=== League ===
- Hong Kong Second Division
  - Champions (1): 2010–11
- Hong Kong Third Division
  - Champions (1): 2009–10
- Hong Kong Third District Division
  - Champions (1): 2009–10

== Head coaches ==
- (Hong Kong) Fung Hoi Man (2002–2003)
- (Hong Kong) Lee Chi Kin (2008–2012)
- (Hong Kong) Chan Siu Ho (2012-2015)
- (Hong Kong) Ko Chun Kay (2015–2022)
- (Hong Kong) Poon Man Tik (2022)
- (Hong Kong) Kwok Kar Lok (2022–2023)
- (Hong Kong) Tang Kwun Yin (2023)
- (Hong Kong) Chan Ho Yin (2023–2024)
- (Hong Kong) Ko Chun Kay (2024-2025)
- (Hong Kong) Wong Tsz Fung (2025-2026)
- (Hong Kong) Lee Kwan Hap (2026)
- (Chile) Oscar Benavides (2026-)
