= Hong Kong Rangers F.C. =

Association football club in Hong Kong

Rangers
- Full name: Hong Kong Rangers Football Club
- Founded: 1958; 68 years ago (as Rangers Football Team)
- Ground: Tsing Yi Sports Ground
- Capacity: 1,500
- President: Michael Mok
- Head coach: Szeto Man Chun
- League: Hong Kong Premier League
- 2025–26: Hong Kong Premier League, 9th of 10
- Website: https://www.facebook.com/hkrangers/
Home colours	Away colours

Hong Kong Rangers Football Club (Chinese: 香港流浪足球會), often abbreviated to Rangers, currently known as Biu Chun Rangers due to sponsorship reasons, is a Hong Kong professional football club which currently competes in the Hong Kong Premier League. They have won the Hong Kong First Division once, the Senior Shield four times, the Hong Kong FA Cup twice and the Sapling Cup once.

== History ==
=== Formation to 2000 ===
The club was founded in 1958 by a Scottish expatriate from Glasgow named Ian Petrie. He named his club after Rangers. It was the first Asian football club with a modern football club managing system. In the early days, the club could not compete with the bigger clubs financially so Petrie relied on young players and the team was known as a breeding ground for young players. Kwok Ka Ming was the best known players discovered by Petrie in the 1960s. In 1970, the club brought three Scottish professional players to Hong Kong. They were the first European professional players to play in the Hong Kong league, opening a new chapter in Hong Kong's football history. Great players such as Ian Taylor, Joe Brennan, Jimmy Liddell, and Derek Currie were a few to name. More were to follow in the 1980s such as Steve Paterson, Jimmy Bone and Tommy Nolan. Winner of the Ballon d’Or at 22, European champion and dubbed “El Beatle” - George Best came just a year before he finally retired from the game and played once for Hong Kong Rangers in 1982.

=== 2000–2018 ===
Since 12 October 2001, the club had been named after its sponsor, Buler, resulting in the name Buler Rangers up until summer 2006. On 15 September 2007, the club announced that it has secured a large sponsorship from Bulova, a watch brand which used to fund a famous Hong Kong football team decades ago, and used Bulova Rangers as the team name.

In 2011, the team changed their name as Kam Fung. They were the champions of the 2011–12 Hong Kong Second Division and were promoted to the Hong Kong First Division. The club has since renamed itself as Biu Chun Rangers due to being sponsorship by Biu Chun Watch Hands (except for the 2016–17 season when the club was renamed as Lee Man Rangers due to sponsorship reasons).

In the early part of the 2000s, Rangers' investment in youth player produced various Hong Kong internationals including Chan Wai Ho, Man Pei Tak, Lam Ka Wai and Lo Kwan Yee. However, this investment dried up in the later part of the 2010s resulting in lower budgets and declining performances of the club.

=== 2018–present ===
Following a last place finish in the 2017–18 Hong Kong Premier League, Rangers were relegated back the First Division after a six-year stay in the top flight. Former Hong Kong international Wong Chin Hung was hired as the club's head coach.

Despite a third-place finish in the 2018–19 season, Rangers were promoted back into the Hong Kong Premier League on 15 July 2019 following Dreams FC's decision to self-relegate.

In 2019–20, Rangers were one of four teams that withdrew from the Premier League season due to the 2020 coronavirus pandemic in Hong Kong.

In the 2022–23 season, Rangers finished 3rd within the Hong Kong Premier League in which they secured one of the two qualification play-off spots where they will make their AFC Champions League debut.

In the 2023–24 season, Rangers became the champions of the Hong Kong Sapling Cup for the first time, which was also their first title in 29 years.

== Name history ==
- 1958–1995: Rangers (香港流浪)
- 1995–1997: UHLSPORT Rangers (UHLSPORT流浪)
- 1997–1999: Rangers (香港流浪)
- 1999: Rangers (奇利寶流浪)
- 1999–2001: Rangers (香港流浪)
- 2001–2006: Buler Rangers (澎馬流浪)
- 2006–2007: Rangers (香港流浪)
- 2007–2008: Bulova Rangers (寶路華流浪)
- 2008–2009: Rangers (香港流浪)
- 2009–2010: Ongood (安華)
- 2010–2011: Biu Chun (標準錶針)
- 2011–2012: Kam Fung (金鋒科技)
- 2012–2016: Biu Chun Rangers (標準流浪)
- 2016–2017: Lee Man Rangers (理文流浪)
- 2017–: Biu Chun Rangers (標準流浪)

== Team staff ==
Position	Staff
Chairman	(Hong Kong) Mok Man Too
Director	(Hong Kong) Poon Man Tik
Head coach	(Hong Kong) Szeto Man Chun
Assistant coaches	(Hong Kong) Chan Sze Chun
Assistant coaches	(Brazil) Fernando Lopes
Assistant coaches	(Hong Kong) Wong Chin Hung
Goalkeeping coach	(Hong Kong) Cheung Wai Hong
Fitness coach	(Macau) Paulo Conde

== Current squad ==
=== First team ===
As of 21 October 2026

Note: Flags indicate national team as defined under FIFA eligibility rules; some limited exceptions apply. Players may hold more than one non-FIFA nationality.

No.	Pos.	Nation	Player
3	DF	BRA	Antenor Junior
4	DF	HKG	Leung Wai Fung
5	DF	IRI	Abdolreza Zarei
6	MF	BRA	Nathan Lourenço
7	FW	HKG	Lau Chi Lok (captain)
9	FW	BRA	Flavio Ticó
10	MF	HKG	Ho Chun Ting
11	MF	HKG	Chen Hao
12	FW	BRA	Matheus Pato
13	DF	BRA	Vitão
14	FW	HKG	Ma Yung Sang
16	FW	HKG	Adiwanashe Shoko
17	DF	HKG	Tsang Cheuk Yin
18	MF	HKG	Lau Yin Hong
19	GK	HKG	Tong Chun Hung
20	MF	HKG	Cheung Ching Wan

No.	Pos.	Nation	Player
21	FW	GHA	Nassam Ibrahim
23	MF	HKG	Yung Ho
25	MF	BRA	Paulinho Souza
26	DF	HKG	Ma Chin Ho
28	DF	HKG	Milos Wong
30	FW	HKG	Chow Wing Hei
32	MF	HKG	Li Wing Ho
33	DF	BRA	Fernando Lopes
35	DF	HKG	Lam Chin Yu
67	DF	HKG	Lau Yat Laam
70	GK	HKG	Yip Ka Yu
77	FW	KOR	Hong Joo-yong
79	FW	HKG	Chow Yee Hin
96	FW	HKG	Owen Chueng
99	GK	HKG	Wong Hiu Long

== Continental record ==
Season	Competition	Round	Club	Home	Away	Aggregate
1995–96	Asian Cup Winners Cup	First round	bye			
1995–96	Asian Cup Winners Cup	Second round	(Japan) Yokohama Flügels	1–3	2–4	3–7
2023–24	AFC Champions League	Preliminary stage	(Vietnam) Haiphong	1–4 (aet)		

== Honours ==
=== League ===
- Hong Kong First Division
  - Champions (1): 1970–71
- Hong Kong Second Division
  - Champions (2): 1964–65, 2011–12
- Hong Kong Third 'A' Division
  - Champions (1): 1991–92

=== Cup competitions ===
- Hong Kong FA Cup
  - Champions (2): 1976–77, 1994–95
- Hong Kong Senior Shield
  - Champions (4): 1965–66, 1970–71, 1974–75, 1994–95
- Hong Kong Sapling Cup
  - Champions (1): 2023–24
- Hong Kong Viceroy Cup
  - Champions (2): 1973–74, 1974–75

== Season-to-season record ==
Season	Tier	Division	Teams	Position	Home stadium	Attendance/G	FA Cup	Senior Shield	League Cup	Sapling Cup
2000–01	1	First Division	8	6			Quarter-finals		Group stage	Not held
2001–02	1	First Division	7	4			Semi-finals		Runners-up	Not held
2002–03	1	First Division	8	3			Runners-up		Semi-finals	Not held
2003–04	1	First Division	10	4			First round		Semi-finals	Not held
2004–05	1	First Division	9	4			Quarter-finals	Quarter-finals	Semi-finals	Not held
2005–06	1	First Division	8	3			Quarter-finals	Quarter-finals	Group stage	Not held
2006–07	1	First Division	10	4			Semi-finals	First round	Group stage	Not held
2007–08	1	First Division	10	10			Quarter-finals	Quarter-finals	Group stage	Not held
2008–09	2	Second Division	10	6			Did not enter	Did not enter	Did not enter	Not held
2009–10	2	Second Division	9	4			Did not enter	Did not enter	Not held	Not held
2010–11	2	Second Division	12	7			Did not enter	Did not enter	Did not enter	Not held
2011–12	2	Second Division	12	1			Did not enter	Did not enter	Did not enter	Not held
2012–13	1	First Division	10	6	Sham Shui Po Sports Ground	868	Quarter-finals	First round	Not held	Not held
2013–14	1	First Division	12	5	Sham Shui Po Sports Ground	472	Semi-finals	Quarter-finals	Not held	Not held
2014–15	1	Premier League	9	7	Kowloon Bay Park	485	Quarter-finals	Quarter-finals	Knock-out stage	Not held
2015–16	1	Premier League	9	8	Kowloon Bay Park	477	Semi-finals	Quarter-finals	Semi-finals	Semi-finals
2016–17	1	Premier League	11	7	Tsing Yi Sports Ground	519	Quarter-finals	First round	Not held	Quarter-finals
2017–18	1	Premier League	10	10	Sham Shui Po Sports Ground	485	Quarter-finals	Quarter-finals	Not held	Group stage
2018–19	2	First Division	14	3			Did not enter	Did not enter	Not held	Did not enter
2019–20	1	Premier League	10	Withdrew	Tuen Mun Tang Shiu Kin Sports Ground	375	First round	Quarter-finals	Not held	Group stage
2020–21	1	Premier League	8	6	Hammer Hill Road Sports Ground	613	Cancelled due to COVID-19 pandemic		Not held	Group stage
2021–22	1	Premier League	8	Cancelled	Sham Shui Po Sports Ground	1,076	Cancelled due to COVID-19 pandemic		Not held	Cancelled due to COVID-19 pandemic
2022–23	1	Premier League	10	3	Hammer Hill Road Sports Ground	466	Runners-up	Semi-finals	Not held	Semi-finals
2023–24	1	Premier League	11	6	Tsing Yi Sports Ground; Mong Kok Stadium	498	Quarter-finals	Semi-finals	Not held	Champions
2024–25	1	Premier League	9	7	Tsing Yi Sports Ground	429	Runners-up	Semi-finals	Not held	Group stage
2025–26	1	Premier League	10	9	Tsing Yi Sports Ground	408	Semi-finals	Runners-up	Quarter-finals	Defunct
2026–27	1	Premier League	11		Tsing Yi Sports Ground			Quarter-finals		Defunct

Note:

1st or Champions 2nd or Runners-up 3rd place Promotion Relegation

== Retired numbers ==
Note: Flags indicate national team as defined under FIFA eligibility rules; some limited exceptions apply. Players may hold more than one non-FIFA nationality.

No.	Pos.	Nation	Player
15	DF	HKG	Cheung Yiu Lun (posthumous)

== Head coaches ==
- (Hong Kong) Li Ping Hung (2001–2002)
- (South Korea) Kim Pan-gon (2002–2004)
- (Hong Kong) Anílton (2004)
- (China) Qiu Jing-wei (2004–2006)
- (Hong Kong) Tim Bredbury (2006)
- (Malaysia) Lim Fung Kee (2006–2007)
- (Hong Kong) Tim Bredbury (2007–2008)
- (Croatia) Goran Paulić (2012)
- (Hong Kong) Chan Hung Ping (2012–2013)
- (Brazil) José Ricardo Rambo (2013–2014)
- (Hong Kong) Cheung Po Chun (2014–2015)
- (Hong Kong) Yan Lik Kin (2015)
- (Brazil) José Ricardo Rambo (2015–2016)
- (Hong Kong) Yan Lik Kin (2016)
- (Hong Kong) Fung Hoi Man (2016–2017)
- (Hong Kong) Lam Hing Lun (2017)
- (Serbia) Dejan Antonić (2017)
- (Hong Kong) Gerard Ambassa Guy (2017–2018)
- (Hong Kong) Fung Wing Sing, (Hong Kong) Su Yang (2018)
- (Hong Kong) Wong Chin Hung (2018–2019)
- (Hong Kong) Chiu Chung Man, (Hong Kong) Wong Chin Hung, (Hong Kong) Lai Ka Fai (2019–2023)
- (Hong Kong) Chiu Chung Man, (Hong Kong) Wong Chin Hung, (Hong Kong) Lai Ka Fai, (Hong Kong) Poon Man Chun (2023)
- (Chinese Taipei) Vom Ca-nhum (2023–2024)
- (Hong Kong) Tim Bredbury (2024)
- (Hong Kong) Wong Chin Hung (2024–2025)
- (Hong Kong) Poon Man Tik (2025–2026)
- (Hong Kong) Szeto Man Chun (2026–present)

== See also ==
- Fourway Athletics
