= 2024–25 Hong Kong Premier League =

Football season

Hong Kong Premier League
- Season: 2024–25
- Dates: 30 August 2024 – 25 May 2025
- Champions: Tai Po (2nd title)
- 2024–25 AFC Champions League Two: Tai Po; Eastern
- Matches: 108
- Goals: 391 (3.62 per match)
- Top goalscorer: Noah Baffoe (21 goals)
- Biggest home win: Kitchee 8–0 Rangers (21 September 2024)
- Biggest away win: Kowloon City 0–5 Kitchee (24 November 2024); Kowloon City 0–5 Rangers (27 April 2025)
- Highest scoring: Lee Man 3–7 Tai Po (30 March 2025)
- Longest winning run: 6 matches Lee Man
- Longest unbeaten run: 10 matches Eastern
- Longest winless run: 14 matches HKFC
- Longest losing run: 7 matches Kowloon City; North District
- Highest attendance: 2,455; Eastern 3–3 Tai Po (13 April 2025)
- Lowest attendance: 172; Rangers 3–1 North District (23 February 2025)
- Total attendance: 74,011
- Average attendance: 685

The 2024–25 Hong Kong Premier League (also known as the BOC Life Hong Kong Premier League for sponsorship reason) was the 11th season of the Hong Kong Premier League, the top division of Hong Kong football.

== Teams ==
A total of 9 teams contest the league, including 8 teams from the 2023–24 Hong Kong Premier League and 1 team promoted from the 2023–24 Hong Kong First Division.

Club	Founded	Position 2023–24
Lee Man	2017	1st
Tai Po	2002	2nd
Eastern	1932	3rd
Kitchee	1931	4th
Southern	2002	5th
Rangers	1958	6th
HKFC	1886	7th
North District	2002	8th
Kowloon City	2002	1st in First Division

=== Stadia and locations ===
Locations of the 2024–25 Hong Kong Premier League clubs

Primary venues used in the Hong Kong Premier League:

Eastern Kitchee	HKFC	Kowloon City	Lee Man
Mong Kok Stadium	HKFC Stadium	Sham Shui Po Sports Ground	Tseung Kwan O Sports Ground
Capacity: **6,664**	Capacity: **2,750**	Capacity: **2,194**	Capacity: **3,500**
North District	Rangers	Southern	Tai Po
North District Sports Ground	Tsing Yi Sports Ground	Aberdeen Sports Ground	Tai Po Sports Ground
Capacity: **2,500**	Capacity: **1,500**	Capacity: **9,000**	Capacity: **3,200**

=== Personnel and kits ===
Team	Chairman	Head coach	Captain	Kit Manufacturer	Sponsors		
Team	Chairman	Head coach	Captain	Kit Manufacturer	Chest Sponsor	Rear Sponsor	Sleeve Sponsor
Eastern	(Hong Kong) Cheng Kai Ming	(Hong Kong) Roberto Losada	(Hong Kong) Leung Chun Pong	Adidas	XDAG by the community	Upbest Group	
HKFC	(Hong Kong) Mark Grainger	(South Africa) Chancy Cooke	(England) Freddie Toomer	Adidas	The Executive Centre	Standard Chartered	
Kitchee	(Hong Kong) Ken Ng	(Portugal) Edgar Cardoso	(Hong Kong) Hélio	Nike	EDPS		Gatorade; MEKO; Team Station
Kowloon City	(Hong Kong) Wong Siu Kei	(Hong Kong) Chan Ming Kong	(Hong Kong) Tsang Kam To	MC Sportswear	Resources Capital	E Cash; Xinyi Glass	Hanaa; Kowloon City District Council
Lee Man	(Hong Kong) Norman Lee	(Hong Kong) Chu Siu Kei	(Hong Kong) Ngan Lok Fung	Macron	Lee & Man Chemical		
North District	(Hong Kong) Chu Ho Yin	(Hong Kong) Chan Chi Hong	(Brazil) Kendy	Kelme			New Harvest Enterprises; Tak Shing Development Investment
Rangers	(Hong Kong) Peter Mok	(Hong Kong) Wong Chin Hung	(Hong Kong) Lau Chi Lok	Kelme	EGL Tours	Biu Chun Watch Hands; Mettip Engineering	Hung Fook Tong; Watsons Water
Southern	(Hong Kong) Matthew Wong	(Hong Kong) Pui Ho Wang	(Japan) Shu Sasaki	Kelme	Isuzu	Kwoon Chung Motors	Hung Fook Tong; OM System; Pillar Sports
Tai Po	(Hong Kong) Lam Yick Kuen	(Hong Kong) Lee Chi Kin	(Brazil) Gabriel Cividini	Cyndicat Sports	Tai Po Sports Association	Four Seasons Chinese Restaurant	Agile Plus Physio; Euro Asia Chinese Golf Association; Royal China Pearl

=== Managerial changes ===
Team	Outgoing manager	Manner of departure	Date of vacancy	Position in table	Incoming manager	Date of appointment
Kitchee	(South Korea) Kim Dong-jin	End of interim spell	27 June 2024	Pre-season	(Portugal) Edgar Cardoso	27 June 2024
North District	(Hong Kong) Leung Chi Wing	Mutual consent	29 June 2024	Pre-season	(Hong Kong) Pau Ka Yiu	29 June 2024
Rangers	(Chinese Taipei) Vom Ca-nhum	Mutual consent	30 June 2024	Pre-season	(Hong Kong) Tim Bredbury	30 June 2024
HKFC	(Hong Kong) Tony Hamilton-Bram	Mutual consent	31 July 2024	Pre-season	(South Africa) Chancy Cooke	31 July 2024
Lee Man	(Hong Kong) Tsang Chiu Tat	Resignation	3 October 2024	3rd	(Hong Kong) Chu Siu Kei (interim)	3 October 2024
Rangers	(Hong Kong) Tim Bredbury	Mutual consent	12 October 2024	7th	(Hong Kong) Wong Chin Hung	12 October 2024
Lee Man	(Hong Kong) Chu Siu Kei (interim)	End of interim spell	21 November 2024	3rd	(Wales) Matthew Holland	21 November 2024
North District	(Hong Kong) Pau Ka Yiu	Change of role	8 January 2025	9th	(Hong Kong) Chan Chi Hong	8 January 2025
Southern	(Hong Kong) Yeung Ching Kwong	Resignation	27 January 2025	6th	(Hong Kong) Pui Ho Wang	27 January 2025
Lee Man	(Wales) Matthew Holland	Mutual consent	10 March 2025	4th	(Hong Kong) Chu Siu Kei (interim)	10 March 2025

=== Foreign players ===
Teams can register an unlimited number of foreign players, but during a match, each team can have at most seven in the squad and at most six on the pitch.

- Players name in **bold** indicates the player is registered during the mid-season transfer window.

Club	Player 1	Player 2	Player 3	Player 4	Player 5	Player 6	Player 7	Player 8	Player 9	Player 10	Player 11	Player 12	Player 13	Former players
Eastern	(Brazil) Felipe Sá	**(China) Gu Bin**	**(Colombia) Carlos Pérez**	(Norway) Nii Noye Narh	(Scotland) Calum Hall	**(Serbia) Aleksander Mitrovic**	(Spain) Daniel Almazan	(Spain) Noah Baffoe	(Spain) Víctor Bertomeu	(Spain) Marcos Gondra				(Kyrgyzstan) Tamirlan Kozubayev
Kitchee	(Brazil) Matheus Dantas	(Brazil) Welthon	(China) Chen Tao	(China) Enikar Mehmud	(England) Fynn Talley	(Japan) Jay Haddow	(South Korea) Bae Jae-woo	(South Korea) Kim Shin-wook	(Philippines) Diego Bardanca	(Portugal) Luís Machado	(Spain) Aarón Rey	(Turkmenistan) Ruslan Mingazow	(Uzbekistan) Sherzod Temirov	
Kowloon City	(Brazil) Willian Gaúcho	(Brazil) Kayron	(Brazil) Niltinho	**(Chinese Taipei) Yang Chao-jing**	**(Japan) Yoshihiro Tanaka**	**(Senegal) Abdoulaye Sané**	**(South Korea) Kang Jun-hyeon**							(Brazil) Victtor Chaves (Brazil) Thawan (South Korea) Lee Keun-ho (South Korea) Seong Min-gyu (Nepal) Aryan Rai
Lee Man	**(Afghanistan) Taufee Skandari**	(Brazil) Samuel Rosa	(Brazil) Paulinho Simionato	**(England) Ryan Tafazolli**	(Estonia) Henri Anier	(Japan) Ryoya Tachibana	(Netherlands) Mitchel Paulissen	(South Korea) Kim Min-kyu						(Iraq) Jiloan Hamad (Spain) Gaizka Martínez
North District	(Brazil) Matheus Chulapa	(Brazil) Weverton Gudula	(Brazil) Guilherme Kayron	(Brazil) Kendy	**(Brazil) Danilo Santos**	**(Colombia) Elian Villalobos**	(England) Benjamin Tandy Ortega							(Brazil) Pedro Costa (England) Félix Pérez-Doyle **(South Korea) Lee Min-woo**
Rangers	**(Brazil) Guilherme Biteco**	(Brazil) Fernando Lopes	(Brazil) Luizinho	**(Ghana) Maxwell Ansah**	**(Ghana) Nassam Ibrahim**	(Japan) Ryota Hayashi	(Japan) Makoto Rindo	**(South Korea) Kang Hyun**	**(South Korea) Lim Hyoung-jun**	(United States) Sebastian Nicot				**(Japan) Daisuke Fukagawa** (Japan) Akito Okamoto (Japan) Shunya Suganuma (Japan) Yusuke Unoki (Mexico) Hugo de Oliveira (South Korea) Kim Do-hyun
Southern	(Argentina) Jonatan Acosta	(Brazil) Gregory	(Brazil) Kessi	(Brazil) Jackson Sousa	(Brazil) Gabriel Yanno	(Japan) Kota Kawase	(Japan) Shu Sasaki	(South Korea) Song Ju-ho						(Brazil) Rondinelli da Silva
Tai Po	(Brazil) Gabriel Cividini	(Brazil) Marcão	(Brazil) Michel Renner	(Brazil) Igor Sartori	(Brazil) Lucas Silva	**(Brazil) Patrick Valverde**	(Brazil) Gerson Vieira	(Brazil) Weverton	**(Colombia) Ítalo Montaño**	**(Colombia) Kevin Moreno**	**(Colombia) Kevin Padilla**	**(Guinea) Habib Bah**		(Brazil) Guilherme Biteco (Brazil) Gabriel Pierini

There are no restrictions on the number of foreign players that HKFC can register. However, the team must have at least 5 Hong Kong players on the pitch during matches.

Club	HK Player 1	HK Player 2	HK Player 3	HK Player 4	HK Player 5	HK Player 6	HK Player 7	HK Player 8	HK Player 9	HK Player 10
HKFC	**(Hong Kong) Oscar Benavides**	(Hong Kong) Calum Bloxham	(Hong Kong) Chan Ho Ka	(Hong Kong) Max Chan	**(Hong Kong) Cheng Chun Wang**	(Hong Kong) Toby Down	(Hong Kong) Ho Ka Chi	(Hong Kong) Lai Hoi To	(Hong Kong) Lam Ho Hei	(Hong Kong) Bradley Leong
HKFC	HK Player 11	HK Player 12	HK Player 13	HK Player 14	HK Player 15	HK Player 16	HK Player 17	HK Player 18	HK Player 19	
HKFC	(Hong Kong) Li Chung Hang	(Hong Kong) Li Yat Chun	**(Hong Kong) Ma Chin Ho**	(Hong Kong) Andy Russell	(Hong Kong) Jack Sealy	(Hong Kong) Tsang Chun Hin	(Hong Kong) Wong Sum Chit	(Hong Kong) James Wright	**(Hong Kong) Bosley Yu**	

== League table ==
Pos	Team	Pld	W	D	L	GF	GA	GD	Pts	Qualification or relegation
1	Tai Po (C)	24	17	4	3	62	31	+31	55	Qualification for AFC Champions League Two group stage
2	Lee Man	24	17	2	5	54	33	+21	53	
3	Eastern	24	15	6	3	54	25	+29	51	Qualification for AFC Champions League Two group stage (Note: Eastern qualified for the AFC Champions League Two group stage as the 2024–25 Hong Kong FA Cup winners.)
4	Kitchee	24	12	6	6	55	25	+30	42	
5	Southern	24	7	7	10	34	35	−1	28	
6	Kowloon City	24	7	3	14	36	65	−29	24	
7	Rangers	24	6	5	13	38	53	−15	23	
8	North District	24	5	3	16	37	65	−28	18	
9	HKFC	24	3	2	19	21	59	−38	11	

Source: Hong Kong Football Association
Rules for classification: 1) Points; 2) Head-to-head points; 3) Head-to-head goal difference; 4) Head-to-head goals scored; 5) Goal difference; 6) Goals scored; 7) Fair-play points; 8) Drawing lots (Play-off if the winner has to be decided).
(C) Champions

== Results ==
=== Home and away ===
Home \ Away	EAS	HKF	KIT	KLC	LEE	NOR	RAN	SOU	TPF
Eastern	—	4–0	1–1	3–1	3–4	5–1	2–0	2–0	3–3
HKFC	0–2	—	1–3	0–2	0–4	2–0	1–3	3–4	2–0
Kitchee	3–0	4–0	—	6–1	1–1	5–0	8–0	1–1	0–1
Kowloon City	1–1	5–3	0–5	—	1–2	3–4	2–0	2–1	2–5
Lee Man	1–2	3–1	4–0	3–1	—	4–1	2–1	1–1	3–7
North District	0–1	2–1	2–2	2–3	0–3	—	3–3	2–3	0–3
Rangers	1–3	1–0	1–2	2–2	1–2	3–1	—	1–1	2–5
Southern	0–2	3–1	1–1	0–1	1–2	2–0	1–0	—	1–1
Tai Po	1–1	2–1	1–0	5–1	2–1	3–1	3–0	3–2	—

Source: HKFA
Legend: Blue = home team win; Yellow = draw; Red = away team win.

=== Third round ===
Home \ Away	EAS	HKF	KIT	KLC	LEE	NOR	RAN	SOU	TPF
Eastern	—	1–1	1–1	—	—	2–1	—	2–1	—
HKFC	—	—	—	0–0	—	—	1–3	1–0	0–4
Kitchee	—	3–1	—	2–3	0–1	1–2	—	—	—
Kowloon City	1–5	—	—	—	—	—	0–5	0–2	1–3
Lee Man	2–1	3–0	—	3–2	—	4–3	—	—	—
North District	—	3–1	—	3–1	—	—	4–4	—	1–2
Rangers	0–4	—	0–1	—	3–0	—	—	—	2–3
Southern	—	—	1–3	—	0–1	4–1	2–2	—	—
Tai Po	1–3	—	1–2	—	1–0	—	—	2–2	—

Source: HKFA
Legend: Blue = home team win; Yellow = draw; Red = away team win.

== Results by match played ==
Win
Draw
Lose

Team ╲ Match	1	2	3	4	5	6	7	8	9	10	11	12	13	14	15	16	17	18	19	20	21	22	23	24
Eastern	W	W	D	W	W	W	D	W	W	D	L	W	L	W	W	W	W	D	D	L	W	W	W	D
HKFC	L	L	L	L	L	W	L	L	W	W	L	D	L	L	L	L	L	D	L	L	L	L	L	L
Kitchee	D	D	W	W	W	L	D	W	D	D	W	W	W	W	L	W	L	W	L	L	W	W	L	D
Kowloon City	L	W	D	L	W	W	W	L	L	L	D	W	L	D	L	W	L	L	L	L	L	L	L	W
Lee Man	W	L	W	W	L	W	D	W	L	W	W	W	W	W	D	W	L	W	W	W	W	W	W	L
North District	D	L	L	L	L	L	L	L	D	D	W	L	L	L	L	L	W	W	W	W	L	L	L	L
Rangers	L	W	L	L	L	D	L	D	L	D	L	W	L	D	W	L	L	W	D	W	L	L	L	W
Southern	L	D	D	L	W	L	D	W	L	D	L	L	W	L	L	D	W	L	L	D	W	D	W	W
Tai Po	W	W	D	W	W	D	W	W	W	L	W	W	L	W	W	W	L	W	W	D	D	W	W	W

Source: Hong Kong Football Association website

== Positions by round ==
To preserve chronological evolvements, any postponed matches are not included to the round at which they were originally scheduled, but added to the full round they were played immediately afterwards. For example, if a match is scheduled for round 7, but then played between rounds 8 and 9, it will be added to the standings for round 9.

Team ╲ Round	1	2	3	4	5	6	7	8	9	10	11	12	13	14	15	16	17	18	19	20	21	22	23	24	25	26	27
Eastern	2	1	1	2	1	1	1	1	1	2	2	2	2	2	2	4	3	2	1	2	2	2	3	3	3	3	3
HKFC	6	9	9	9	9	9	8	8	8	7	7	7	7	7	7	8	8	8	8	9	9	9	9	9	9	9	9
Kitchee	4	6	4	4	2	5	5	5	4	4	4	3	4	4	3	2	4	3	4	4	4	4	4	4	4	4	4
Kowloon City	9	5	5	5	4	3	4	4	5	5	5	5	5	5	5	5	5	5	5	5	5	5	5	6	6	6	6
Lee Man	3	4	3	3	5	4	3	3	3	3	3	4	3	3	4	3	2	4	3	3	3	3	2	1	1	1	2
North District	5	8	8	8	8	8	9	9	9	9	9	8	8	9	9	9	9	9	9	8	8	7	8	8	8	8	8
Rangers	8	3	6	6	7	7	7	7	7	8	8	9	9	8	8	7	7	7	7	7	7	8	7	7	7	7	7
Southern	7	7	7	7	6	6	6	6	6	6	6	6	6	6	6	6	6	6	6	6	6	6	6	5	5	5	5
Tai Po	1	2	2	1	3	2	2	2	2	1	1	1	1	1	1	1	1	1	2	1	1	1	1	2	2	2	1

Leader - 2025–26 AFC Champions League Two

Source: Hong Kong Football Association website

== Fixtures and results ==
=== Round 1 ===
30 August 2024	Eastern	2–0	Rangers	Mong Kok, Kowloon
20:00	Ma Hei Wai 5'; Bertomeu 35'	Report		Stadium: Mong Kok Stadium; Attendance: 2,010; Referee: Tam Ping Wun

31 August 2024	Southern	1–2	Lee Man	Aberdeen, Hong Kong Island
16:00	Gregory 15'	Report	Everton 25'; Paulinho 90+8'	Stadium: Aberdeen Sports Ground; Attendance: 785; Referee: Liu Kwok Man

31 August 2024	North District	2–2	Kitchee	Sheung Shui, New Territories
16:00	Kendy 85'; Chulapa 90'	Report	Temirov 22' (pen.); Juninho 70'	Stadium: North District Sports Ground; Attendance: 685; Referee: Wong Wai Lun

1 September 2024	Tai Po	5–1	Kowloon City	Tai Po, New Territories
16:00	Sartori 29' (pen.); Chan Siu Kwan 45+7', 68'; Renner 46'; Lee Lok Him 90+2'	Report	Diego 35'	Stadium: Tai Po Sports Ground; Attendance: 1,300; Referee: Poon Chun Kit

=== Round 2 ===
14 September 2024	Tai Po	2–1	Lee Man	Tai Po, New Territories
16:00	Lucas 68'; Renner 76'	Report	Everton 21'	Stadium: Tai Po Sports Ground; Attendance: 1,454; Referee: Luk Kin Sun

14 September 2024	Kitchee	1–1	Southern	Mong Kok, Kowloon
18:30	Juninho 90'	Report	Gregory 39'	Stadium: Mong Kok Stadium; Attendance: 792; Referee: Tam Ping Wun

15 September 2024	North District	2–3	Kowloon City	Sheung Shui, New Territories
16:00	Gudula 79'; Kendy 81'	Report	Kendy 10' (o.g.); Kayron 34'; Hui Ka Lok 90+4'	Stadium: North District Sports Ground; Attendance: 230; Referee: Ho Wai Sing

15 September 2024	HKFC	1–3	Rangers	Happy Valley, Hong Kong Island
16:30	Chen Hao 19'	Report	Lau Chi Lok 2', 41', 90+3'	Stadium: Hong Kong Football Club Stadium; Attendance: 818; Referee: Tang Hing Fu

=== Round 3 ===
21 September 2024	Southern	1–1	Tai Po	Aberdeen, Hong Kong Island
16:00	Gregory 90+6'	Report	Lucas 45+4'	Stadium: Aberdeen Sports Ground; Attendance: 427; Referee: Wong Po Sing

21 September 2024	Kitchee	8–0	Rangers	Mong Kok, Kowloon
18:30	Juninho 13'; Machado 21', 37'; Welthon 40', 56'; Mingazow 54'; Temirov 79'; Poon Pui Hin 88'	Report		Stadium: Mong Kok Stadium; Attendance: 724; Referee: Wong Wai Lun

22 September 2024	Kowloon City	1–1	Eastern	Sham Shui Po, Kowloon
16:00	Jojo 6' (o.g.)	Report	Bertomeu 90+13'	Stadium: Sham Shui Po Sports Ground; Attendance: 449; Referee: Poon Chun Kit

22 September 2024	Lee Man	3–1	HKFC	Tseung Kwan O, New Territories
16:00	Rosa 25'; Paulinho 60'; Everton 69'	Report	Russell 84'	Stadium: Tseung Kwan O Sports Ground; Attendance: 358; Referee: Tang Hing Fu

=== Round 4 ===
28 September 2024	Lee Man	2–1	Rangers	Tseung Kwan O, New Territories
18:30	Everton 45+3'; Anier 64'	Report	Chang Kwong Yin 7'	Stadium: Tseung Kwan O Sports Ground; Attendance: 461; Referee: Yu Kin Fung

29 September 2024	North District	0–3	Tai Po	Sheung Shui, New Territories
16:00		Report	Biteco 29' (pen.); Renner 41'; Yip Cheuk Man 75' (o.g.)	Stadium: North District Sports Ground; Attendance: 770; Referee: Woo Chun Sing

29 September 2024	HKFC	0–2	Kowloon City	Happy Valley, Hong Kong Island
16:30		Report	Kayron 5' (pen.); Willian 86'	Stadium: Hong Kong Football Club Stadium; Attendance: 539; Referee: Cheung Wai Lung

2 February 2025	Kitchee	3–0	Eastern	Mong Kok, Kowloon
18:00	Temirov 8'; Fernando 31'; Rey 45+4'	Report		Stadium: Mong Kok Stadium; Attendance: 1,589; Referee: Liu Kwok Man

=== Round 5 ===
5 October 2024	Southern	2–0	North District	Aberdeen, Hong Kong Island
15:00	Kessi 42' (pen.); Awal 81'	Report		Stadium: Aberdeen Sports Ground; Attendance: 348; Referee: Lau Fong Hei

5 October 2024	Kitchee	4–0	HKFC	Mong Kok, Kowloon
18:00	Rey 6'; Ngan Cheuk Pan 65'; Welthon 90+1', 90+6'	Report		Stadium: Mong Kok Stadium; Attendance: 644; Referee: Poon Chun Kit

6 October 2024	Kowloon City	2–0	Rangers	Sham Shui Po, Kowloon
15:00	Kayron 1'; Lee Keun-ho 43'	Report		Stadium: Sham Shui Po Sports Ground; Attendance: 471; Referee: Luk Kin Sun

6 October 2024	Lee Man	1–2	Eastern	Tseung Kwan O, New Territories
18:00	Paulissen 58' (pen.)	Report	Ma Hei Wai 21'; Gondra 64'	Stadium: Tseung Kwan O Sports Ground; Attendance: 1,050; Referee: Liu Kwok Man

=== Round 6 ===
19 October 2024	Tai Po	1–0	Kitchee	Tai Po, New Territories
15:00	Lucas 73'	Report		Stadium: Tai Po Sports Ground; Attendance: 1,464; Referee: Wong Wai Lun

19 October 2024	Eastern	4–0	HKFC	Mong Kok, Kowloon
18:00	Leung Kwun Chung 40'; Gondra 51', 90+3'; Baffoe 78'	Report		Stadium: Mong Kok Stadium; Attendance: 484; Referee: Luk Kin Sun

20 October 2024	Kowloon City	2–1	Southern	Sham Shui Po, Kowloon
15:00	Lee Keun-ho 20'; Kayron 27'	Report	Gregory 86'	Stadium: Sham Shui Po Sports Ground; Attendance: 423; Referee: Wong Po Sing

20 October 2024	Lee Man	4–1	North District	Tseung Kwan O, New Territories
18:00	Paulissen 38'; Everton 76'; Yip Cheuk Man 82' (o.g.); Anier 90+3'	Report	Chulapa 42'	Stadium: Tseung Kwan O Sports Ground; Attendance: 274; Referee: Lau Fong Hei

=== Round 7 ===
2 November 2024	Tai Po	1–1	Eastern	Tai Po, New Territories
15:00	Renner 56'	Report	Baffoe 9'	Stadium: Tai Po Sports Ground; Attendance: 1,462; Referee: Tam Ping Wun

2 November 2024	Kitchee	1–1	Lee Man	Mong Kok, Kowloon
18:00	Poon Pui Hin 45+1'	Report	Anier 35'	Stadium: Mong Kok Stadium; Attendance: 1,682; Referee: Liu Kwok Man

3 November 2024	Rangers	1–1	Southern	Tsing Yi, New Territories
15:00	Okamoto 18'	Report	Awal 90+6'	Stadium: Tsing Yi Sports Ground; Attendance: 352; Referee: Yu Kin Fung

3 November 2024	HKFC	2–0	North District	Happy Valley, Hong Kong Island
16:30	Scally 13' (pen.); Russell 18'	Report		Stadium: Hong Kong Football Club Stadium; Attendance: 313; Referee: Poon Chun Kit

=== Round 8 ===
9 November 2024	Tai Po	3–0	Rangers	Tai Po, New Territories
15:00	Law Chun Ting 37'; Lucas 50'; Chang Kwong Yin 69' (o.g.)	Report		Stadium: Tai Po Sports Ground; Attendance: 668; Referee: Tang Hing Fu

9 November 2024	Lee Man	3–1	Kowloon City	Tseung Kwan O, New Territories
18:00	Dudu 56'; Everton 72'; Rosa 83'	Report	Hui Ka Lok 52'	Stadium: Tseung Kwan O Sports Ground; Attendance: 453; Referee: Lau Fong Hei

10 November 2024	Eastern	2–1	North District	Mong Kok, Kowloon
15:00	Gondra 8'; Baffoe 60'	Report	Chulapa 54'	Stadium: Mong Kok Stadium; Attendance: 596; Referee: Cheung Wai Lung

10 November 2024	HKFC	3–4	Southern	Happy Valley, Hong Kong Island
16:30	Scally 13', 88' (pen.); Salazar 30'	Report	Pereira 4', 45+1' (pen.), 47'; Gregory 6'	Stadium: Hong Kong Football Club Stadium; Attendance: 512; Referee: Wong Wai Lun

=== Round 9 ===
23 November 2024	Tai Po	2–1	HKFC	Tai Po, New Territories
15:00	Chan Siu Kwan 19'; Lucas 42'	Report	Henrique 52'	Stadium: Tai Po Sports Ground; Attendance: 473; Referee: Yu Kin Fung

24 November 2024	Kowloon City	0–5	Kitchee	Sham Shui Po, Kowloon
15:00		Report	Welthon 13'; Rey 19'; Poon Pui Hin 28'; Mingazow 30'; Juninho 35'	Stadium: Sham Shui Po Sports Ground; Attendance: 698; Referee: Liu Kwok Man

24 November 2024	North District	3–3	Rangers	Sheung Shui, New Territories
15:00	Chulapa 3'; Kendy 16'; Lo Kong Wai 25'	Report	Luizinho 40', 90+5'; Lau Chi Lok 79'	Stadium: North District Sports Ground; Attendance: 188; Referee: Luk Kin Sun

5 March 2025	Eastern	2–1	Southern	Mong Kok, Kowloon
20:00	Baffoe 51'; Mitrovic 74'	Report	Gregory 66'	Stadium: Mong Kok Stadium; Attendance: 454; Referee: Poon Chun Kit

=== Round 10 ===
12 September 2024	Eastern	5–1	North District	Mong Kok, Kowloon
20:00	Bertomeu 9'; Almazan 13'; Baffoe 29'; Wong Ho Chun 48'; Ng Yu Hei 52'	Report	Gudula 64'	Stadium: Mong Kok Stadium; Attendance: 768; Referee: Woo Chun Sing

25 September 2024	Kitchee	6–1	Kowloon City	Mong Kok, Kowloon
20:00	Welthon 45'; Machado 51'; Temirov 55', 60', 85'; Chen Ngo Hin 90+1'	Report	Kayron 65'	Stadium: Mong Kok Stadium; Attendance: 649; Referee: Luk Kin Sun

21 December 2024	Rangers	2–5	Tai Po	Tsing Yi, New Territories
15:00	Luizinho 34'; Leung Wai Fung 63'	Report	Lucas 43', 70', 90+4'; Renner 45+1'; Cividini 82'	Stadium: Tsing Yi Sports Ground; Attendance: 392; Referee: Lau Fong Hei

22 December 2024	HKFC	1–0	Southern	Happy Valley, Hong Kong Island
16:30	Salazar 45'	Report		Stadium: Hong Kong Football Club Stadium; Attendance: 522; Referee: Yu Kin Fung

=== Round 11 ===
28 September 2024	Southern	0–2	Eastern	Aberdeen, Hong Kong Island
16:00		Report	Gondra 49'; Baffoe 76'	Stadium: Aberdeen Sports Ground; Attendance: 540; Referee: Ho Wai Sing

5 January 2025	North District	4–4	Rangers	Sheung Shui, New Territories
15:00	Gudula 11', 19'; Kendy 34', 45'	Report	Lau Chi Lok 42', 68'; Fernando 80'; Luizinho 88' (pen.)	Stadium: North District Sports Ground; Attendance: 281; Referee: Tam Ping Wun

5 January 2025	HKFC	2–0	Tai Po	Happy Valley, Hong Kong Island
16:30	Beattie 10'; Down 44'	Report		Stadium: Hong Kong Football Club Stadium; Attendance: 613; Referee: Ho Wai Sing

26 February 2025	Kitchee	2–3	Kowloon City	Mong Kok, Kowloon
20:00	Rey 38'; Juninho 45+7'	Report	Yang Chao-jing 71'; Willian 72'; Kayron 76'	Stadium: Mong Kok Stadium; Attendance: 667; Referee: Liu Kwok Man

=== Round 12 ===
11 January 2025	Southern	1–1	Kitchee	Aberdeen, Hong Kong Island
15:00	Jackson 19'	Report	Machado 55'	Stadium: Aberdeen Sports Ground; Attendance: 465; Referee: Lau Fong Hei

11 January 2025	Tai Po	1–0	Lee Man	Tai Po, New Territories
15:00	Lucas 9'	Report		Stadium: Tai Po Sports Ground; Attendance: 1,233; Referee: Wong Wai Lun

12 January 2025	North District	3–1	Kowloon City	Sheung Shui, New Territories
15:00	Kendy 37'; Villalobos 39'; Gudula 42'	Report	Kayron 90'	Stadium: North District Sports Ground; Attendance: 319; Referee: Ho Wai Sing

12 January 2025	HKFC	0–2	Eastern	Happy Valley, Hong Kong Island
16:30		Report	Gondra 77'; Ma Hei Wai 84'	Stadium: Hong Kong Football Club Stadium; Attendance: 832; Referee: Wong Po Sing

=== Round 13 ===
18 January 2025	North District	1–2	Tai Po	Sheung Shui, New Territories
15:00	Singh 45+1'	Report	Sartori 41'; Chan Siu Kwan 42'	Stadium: North District Sports Ground; Attendance: 533; Referee: Poon Chun Kit

18 January 2025	Eastern	1–1	Kitchee	Mong Kok, Kowloon
18:00	Baffoe 32' (pen.)	Report	Machado 16'	Stadium: Mong Kok Stadium; Attendance: 1,748; Referee: Tam Ping Wun

19 January 2025	Rangers	1–2	Lee Man	Tsing Yi, New Territories
15:00	Luizinho 78' (pen.)	Report	Everton 45+2' (pen.); Paulinho 47'	Stadium: Tsing Yi Sports Ground; Attendance: 429; Referee: Liu Kwok Man

19 January 2025	HKFC	0–0	Kowloon City	Happy Valley, Hong Kong Island
16:30		Report		Stadium: Hong Kong Football Club Stadium; Attendance: 451; Referee: Woo Chun Sing

=== Round 14 ===
25 January 2025	Southern	0–1	Kowloon City	Aberdeen, Hong Kong Island
15:00		Report	Yim Kai Cheuk 75'	Stadium: Aberdeen Sports Ground; Attendance: 328; Referee: Cheung Wai Lung

25 January 2025	Lee Man	4–3	North District	Tseung Kwan O, New Territories
18:00	Everton 66', 90+10'; Paulinho 73'; Li Ngai Hoi 90+7'	Report	Lo Kong Wai 26'; Ho Chun Ting 64'; Gudula 85'	Stadium: Tseung Kwan O Sports Ground; Attendance: 289; Referee: Tang Hing Fu

26 January 2025	Tai Po	1–2	Kitchee	Tai Po, New Territories
15:00	Renner 11'	Report	Temirov 29'; Fernando 45+6' (pen.)	Stadium: Tai Po Sports Ground; Attendance: 1,502; Referee: Wong Wai Lun

26 January 2025	Rangers	1–0	HKFC	Tsing Yi, New Territories
18:00	Ibrahim 90+1'	Report		Stadium: Tsing Yi Sports Ground; Attendance: 217; Referee: Poon Chun Kit

=== Round 15 ===
8 February 2025	Lee Man	3–2	Kowloon City	Tseung Kwan O, New Territories
15:00	Anier 68', 74'; Everton 72' (pen.)	Report	Kayron 24' (pen.); Willian 64'	Stadium: Tseung Kwan O Sports Ground; Attendance: 422; Referee: Cheung Wai Lung

8 February 2025	Eastern	2–0	Southern	Mong Kok, Kowloon
18:00	Baffoe 45+6' (pen.), 90+4'	Report		Stadium: Mong Kok Stadium; Attendance: 723; Referee: Wong Po Sing

9 February 2025	Rangers	1–2	Kitchee	Tsing Yi, New Territories
15:00	Lau Chi Lok 28'	Report	Welthon 54', 70'	Stadium: Tsing Yi Sports Ground; Attendance: 400; Referee: Luk Kin Sun

9 February 2025	HKFC	0–4	Tai Po	Happy Valley, Hong Kong Island
16:30		Report	Chan Siu Kwan 33', 38'; Sartori 69'; Cividini 72'	Stadium: Hong Kong Football Club Stadium; Attendance: 649; Referee: Woo Chun Sing

=== Round 16 ===
15 February 2025	Southern	4–1	North District	Aberdeen, Hong Kong Island
15:00	Gregory 2'; Wong Ho Yin 56'; Pereira 78'; Jackson 80'	Report	Villalobos 5'	Stadium: Aberdeen Sports Ground; Attendance: 291; Referee: Lau Fong Hei

15 February 2025	Rangers	2–2	Kowloon City	Tsing Yi, New Territories
18:00	Lau Chi Lok 62'; Luizinho 74'	Report	Ho Lung Ho 38'; Chan Man Fai 87'	Stadium: Tsing Yi Sports Ground; Attendance: 264; Referee: Tam Ping Wun

16 February 2025	Eastern	3–4	Lee Man	Mong Kok, Kowloon
15:00	Gondra 45+6'; Jojo 48'; Leung Chun Pong 57'	Report	Wong Wai 19', 79'; Rosa 71'; Paulinho 77'	Stadium: Mong Kok Stadium; Attendance: 1,202; Referee: Yu Kin Fung

16 February 2025	HKFC	1–3	Kitchee	Happy Valley, Hong Kong Island
16:30	Beattie 32'	Report	Fernando 45+4'; Beattie 48' (o.g.); Temirov 90+7'	Stadium: Hong Kong Football Club Stadium; Attendance: 801; Referee: Liu Kwok Man

=== Round 17 ===
22 February 2025	Tai Po	3–2	Southern	Tai Po, New Territories
15:00	Lucas 17'; Marcão 44'; Padilla 65'	Report	Wong Ho Yin 11'; Sasaki 79'	Stadium: Tai Po Sports Ground; Attendance: 632; Referee: Poon Chun Kit

22 February 2025	Lee Man	3–0	HKFC	Tseung Kwan O, New Territories
18:00	Everton 50', 90+2'; Anier 86'	Report		Stadium: Tseung Kwan O Sports Ground; Attendance: 308; Referee: Tang Hing Fu

23 February 2025	Kowloon City	1–5	Eastern	Sham Shui Po, Kowloon
15:00	Fung Tin Wing 18'	Report	Sá 11'; Baffoe 42', 81'; Mitrovic 85'; Jojo 90+11'	Stadium: Sham Shui Po Sports Ground; Attendance: 685; Referee: Wong Wai Lun

23 February 2025	Rangers	3–1	North District	Tsing Yi, New Territories
18:00	Luizinho 45+5' (pen.); Hayashi 55'; Yiu Ho Ming 78'	Report	Gudula 54' (pen.)	Stadium: Tsing Yi Sports Ground; Attendance: 172; Referee: Tam Ping Wun

=== Round 18 ===
8 March 2025	Kitchee	5–0	North District	Mong Kok, Kowloon
15:00	Machado 17'; Rey 33'; Juninho 35', 78'; Temirov 79'	Report		Stadium: Mong Kok Stadium; Attendance: 614; Referee: Tang Hing Fu

8 March 2025	Rangers	1–3	Eastern	Tsing Yi, New Territories
18:00	Ibrahim 45+5'	Report	Baffoe 12'; Gondra 24', 59'	Stadium: Tsing Yi Sports Ground; Attendance: 342; Referee: Woo Chun Sing

9 March 2025	Kowloon City	2–5	Tai Po	Sham Shui Po, Kowloon
15:00	Lam Hok Hei 28', 53'	Report	Padilla 2'; Lucas 8', 45+6', 63'; Sartori 54'	Stadium: Sham Shui Po Sports Ground; Attendance: 776; Referee: Wong Wai Lun

9 March 2025	Lee Man	1–1	Southern	Tseung Kwan O, New Territories
18:00	Rosa 72'	Report	Song Ju-ho 6'	Stadium: Tseung Kwan O Sports Ground; Attendance: 381; Referee: Wong Po Sing

=== Round 19 ===
15 March 2025	North District	2–1	HKFC	Sheung Shui, New Territories
15:00	Chulapa 18', 22'	Report	Salazar 30'	Stadium: North District Sports Ground; Attendance: 175; Referee: Yu Kin Fung

15 March 2025	Kitchee	0–1	Lee Man	Mong Kok, Kowloon
18:00		Report	Everton 67'	Stadium: Mong Kok Stadium; Attendance: 1,147; Referee: Wong Wai Lun

16 March 2025	Southern	1–0	Rangers	Aberdeen, Hong Kong Island
15:00	Song Ju-ho 40'	Report		Stadium: Aberdeen Sports Ground; Attendance: 286; Referee: Cheung Wai Lung

16 March 2025	Tai Po	1–3	Eastern	Tai Po, New Territories
15:00	Chan Siu Kwan 24'	Report	Mitrovic 73'; Baffoe 74', 90+3'	Stadium: Tai Po Sports Ground; Attendance: 1,886; Referee: Tam Ping Wun

=== Round 20 ===
29 March 2025	Southern	1–3	Kitchee	Aberdeen, Hong Kong Island
15:00	Kessi 90+7' (pen.)	Report	Juninho 50'; Temirov 60'; Law Tsz Chun 62'	Stadium: Aberdeen Sports Ground; Attendance: 506; Referee: Liu Kwok Man

29 March 2025	Eastern	1–1	HKFC	Mong Kok, Kowloon
18:00	Baffoe 47'	Report	Beattie 77'	Stadium: Mong Kok Stadium; Attendance: 495; Referee: Wong Po Sing

30 March 2025	Kowloon City	3–4	North District	Sham Shui Po, Kowloon
15:00	Lam Hok Hei 10'; Kayron 45+5'; Sané 47'	Report	Gudula 7'; Diego 20' (o.g.); Wong Wai Kwok 65'; Khan 90+3'	Stadium: Sham Shui Po Sports Ground; Attendance: 492; Referee: Cheung Wai Lung

30 March 2025	Lee Man	3–7	Tai Po	Tseung Kwan O, New Territories
18:00	Anier 60', 87'; Everton 73'	Report	Sartori 18', 26' (pen.); Renner 45+5', 67', 77'; Chan Siu Kwan 69'; Valverde 75'	Stadium: Tseung Kwan O Sports Ground; Attendance: 1,031; Referee: Tam Ping Wun

=== Round 21 ===
5 April 2025	Southern	0–1	Lee Man	Aberdeen, Hong Kong Island
15:00		Report	Everton 5'	Stadium: Aberdeen Sports Ground; Attendance: 502; Referee: Lau Fong Hei

5 April 2025	Kitchee	1–2	North District	Mong Kok, Kowloon
18:00	Rey 30'	Report	Kendy 52', 90+8'	Stadium: Mong Kok Stadium; Attendance: 526; Referee: Wong Wai Lun

6 April 2025	Kowloon City	1–3	Tai Po	Sham Shui Po, Kowloon
15:00	Kang Jun-hyeon 15'	Report	Cividini 59'; Chan Siu Kwan 74', 77'	Stadium: Sham Shui Po Sports Ground; Attendance: 770; Referee: Woo Chun Sing

6 April 2025	HKFC	1–3	Rangers	Happy Valley, Hong Kong Island
16:30	Léo 90+7' (pen.)	Report	Luizinho 8' (pen.); Ansah 16'; Ibrahim 90+5'	Stadium: Hong Kong Football Club Stadium; Attendance: 424; Referee: Yu Kin Fung

=== Round 22 ===
12 April 2025	Southern	2–2	Rangers	Aberdeen, Hong Kong Island
15:00	Ansah 27' (o.g.); Awal 60'	Report	Ibrahim 45+4'; Braunshtain 45+10' (pen.)	Stadium: Aberdeen Sports Ground; Attendance: 237; Referee: Tang Hing Fu

12 April 2025	Lee Man	4–0	Kitchee	Tseung Kwan O, New Territories
18:00	Everton 3'; Dudu 31'; Anier 58'; Paulissen 60'	Report		Stadium: Tseung Kwan O Sports Ground; Attendance: 634; Referee: Lau Fong Hei

13 April 2025	North District	3–1	HKFC	Sheung Shui, New Territories
15:00	Wong Wai Kwok 6', 67'; Villalobos 72'	Report	Léo 42'	Stadium: North District Sports Ground; Attendance: 236; Referee: Ho Wai Sing

13 April 2025	Eastern	3–3	Tai Po	Mong Kok, Kowloon
18:00	Hall 31'; Ma Hei Wai 60'; Baffoe 84' (pen.)	Report	Lucas 2', 6'; Sartori 55'	Stadium: Mong Kok Stadium; Attendance: 2,455; Referee: Wong Wai Lun

=== Round 23 ===
26 April 2025	Kitchee	3–1	HKFC	Mong Kok, Kowloon
15:00	Dantas 20'; Fernando 75'; Juninho 88'	Report	Léo 3' (pen.)	Stadium: Mong Kok Stadium; Attendance: 511; Referee: Wong Po Sing

26 April 2025	Lee Man	2–1	Eastern	Tseung Kwan O, New Territories
18:00	Dudu 67'; Tachibana 70'	Report	Lee Chun Ting 82'	Stadium: Tseung Kwan O Sports Ground; Attendance: 1,225; Referee: Luk Kin Sun

27 April 2025	North District	2–3	Southern	Sheung Shui, New Territories
15:00	Gudula 60' (pen.); Danilo 73'	Report	Pereira 6', 69'; Kawase 53'	Stadium: North District Sports Ground; Attendance: 308; Referee: Cheung Wai Lung

27 April 2025	Kowloon City	0–5	Rangers	Sham Shui Po, Kowloon
15:00		Report	Braunshtain 28'; Lau Chi Lok 32'; Ibrahim 45+6'; Luizinho 47'; Yiu Ho Ming 90'	Stadium: Sham Shui Po Sports Ground; Attendance: 347; Referee: Woo Chun Sing

=== Round 24 ===
4 May 2025	Rangers	0–1	Kitchee	Tsing Yi, New Territories
15:00		Report	Temirov 64'	Stadium: Tsing Yi Sports Ground; Attendance: 375; Referee: Ho Wai Sing

4 May 2025	HKFC	0–4	Lee Man	Happy Valley, Hong Kong Island
16:30		Report	Rosa 7'; Tafazolli 37'; Anier 55'; Everton 86'	Stadium: Hong Kong Football Club Stadium; Attendance: 932; Referee: Tam Ping Wun

5 May 2025	Eastern	3–1	Kowloon City	Mong Kok, Kowloon
15:00	Lee Chun Ting 43'; Baffoe 57', 88' (pen.)	Report	Yang Chao-jing 45'	Stadium: Mong Kok Stadium; Attendance: 655; Referee: Liu Kwok Man

5 May 2025	Tai Po	2–2	Southern	Tai Po, New Territories
15:00	Cividini 2'; Chung Wai Keung 90'	Report	Pereira 68' (pen.); Wong Ho Yin 81'	Stadium: Tai Po Sports Ground; Attendance: 1,176; Referee: Poon Chun Kit

=== Round 25 ===
10 May 2025	Southern	3–1	HKFC	Aberdeen, Hong Kong Island
15:00	Gregory 19'; Yung Ho 37'; Awal 41'	Report	Léo 34'	Stadium: Aberdeen Sports Ground; Attendance: 373; Referee: Woo Chun Sing

10 May 2025	Rangers	2–3	Tai Po	Tsing Yi, New Territories
18:00	Lau Chi Lok 21'; Ma Yung Sang 90'	Report	Lucas 42'; Sartori 59'; Valverde 90+6'	Stadium: Tsing Yi Sports Ground; Attendance: 375; Referee: Wong Wai Lun

11 May 2025	Kowloon City	1–2	Lee Man	Sham Shui Po, Kowloon
15:00	Kayron 90+9'	Report	Anier 45+5'; Rosa 90+10'	Stadium: Sham Shui Po Sports Ground; Attendance: 673; Referee: Yu Kin Fung

11 May 2025	North District	0–1	Eastern	Sheung Shui, New Territories
15:00		Report	Gondra 7'	Stadium: North District Sports Ground; Attendance: 303; Referee: Luk Kin Sun

=== Round 26 ===
17 May 2025	North District	0–3	Lee Man	Sheung Shui, New Territories
15:00		Report	Paulissen 31'; Everton 32', 80'	Stadium: North District Sports Ground; Attendance: 539; Referee: Lau Fong Hei

17 May 2025	Kitchee	0–1	Tai Po	Mong Kok, Kowloon
18:00		Report	Law Chun Ting 41'	Stadium: Mong Kok Stadium; Attendance: 1,808; Referee: Tam Ping Wun

18 May 2025	Kowloon City	0–2	Southern	Sham Shui Po, Kowloon
15:00		Report	Acosta 45+4'; Pereira 72'	Stadium: Sham Shui Po Sports Ground; Attendance: 404; Referee: Tang Hing Fu

18 May 2025	Rangers	0–4	Eastern	Tsing Yi, New Territories
18:00		Report	Baffoe 19' (pen.), 55'; Ma Hei Wai 29'; Bertomeu 50'	Stadium: Tsing Yi Sports Ground; Attendance: 334; Referee: Poon Chun Kit

=== Round 27 ===
25 May 2025	Kowloon City	5–3	HKFC	Sham Shui Po, Kowloon
15:00	Kayron 42', 68', 74'; Lam Hok Hei 60', 82'	Report	McGunnigle 25'; Léo 74'; Kedwards 86'	Stadium: Sham Shui Po Sports Ground; Attendance: 244; Referee: Wong Po Sing

25 May 2025	Tai Po	3–1	North District	Tai Po, New Territories
15:00	Lucas 13', 60'; Valverde 45+3'	Report	Chulapa 69'	Stadium: Tai Po Sports Ground; Attendance: 1,486; Referee: Liu Kwok Man

25 May 2025	Rangers	3–0	Lee Man	Tsing Yi, New Territories
15:00	Biteco 74'; Lau Chi Lok 86', 89'	Report		Stadium: Tsing Yi Sports Ground; Attendance: 1,496; Referee: Wong Wai Lun

25 May 2025	Eastern	1–1	Kitchee	Mong Kok, Kowloon
15:00	Baffoe 84' (pen.)	Report	Temirov 70' (pen.)	Stadium: Mong Kok Stadium; Attendance: 787; Referee: Yu Kin Fung

== Season statistics ==
=== Top scorers ===
Rank	Player	Club	Goals
1	(Spain) Noah Baffoe	Eastern	21
2	(Hong Kong) Everton Camargo	Lee Man	19
3	(Brazil) Lucas Silva	Tai Po	18
4	(Brazil) Kayron	Kowloon City	13
5	(Hong Kong) Lau Chi Lok	Rangers	12
5	(Uzbekistan) Sherzod Temirov	Kitchee	12
7	(Estonia) Henri Anier	Lee Man	11
8	(Hong Kong) Chan Siu Kwan	Tai Po	10
8	(Spain) Marcos Gondra	Eastern	10
10	(Brazil) Weverton Gudula	North District	9
10	(Hong Kong) Juninho	Kitchee	9
10	(Brazil) Luizinho	Rangers	9
10	(Brazil) Michel Renner	Tai Po	9

=== Hat-tricks ===
Note: The results column shows the scorer's team score first. Teams in bold are home teams.

#	Player	For	Against	Result	Date	Ref
1	(Hong Kong) Lau Chi Lok	Rangers	**HKFC**	3–1	15 September 2024	
2	(Uzbekistan) Sherzod Temirov	**Kitchee**	Kowloon City	6–1	25 September 2024	
3	(Hong Kong) Stefan Pereira	Southern	**HKFC**	4–3	10 November 2024	
4	(Brazil) Lucas Silva	Tai Po	**Rangers**	5–2	21 December 2024	
5	(Brazil) Lucas Silva	Tai Po	**Kowloon City**	5–2	9 March 2025	
6	(Brazil) Michel Renner	Tai Po	**Lee Man**	7–3	30 March 2025	
7	(Brazil) Kayron	**Kowloon City**	HKFC	5–3	25 May 2025	

=== Clean sheets ===
Rank	Player	Club	Matches
1	(Hong Kong) Chan Ka Ho	Lee Man	6
1	(England) Fynn Talley	Kitchee	6
1	(Hong Kong) Tse Ka Wing	Tai Po	6
1	(Hong Kong) Yapp Hung Fai	Eastern	6
5	(Hong Kong) Ng Wai Him	Southern	3
5	(England) Freddie Toomer	HKFC	3
5	(Hong Kong) Yuen Ho Chun	Kowloon City	3
8	(Hong Kong) Oleksii Shliakotin	Rangers	2
9	(Hong Kong) Chan Kun Sun	Rangers	1
9	(Hong Kong) Li Hon Ho	Kowloon City	1
9	(Hong Kong) Li Yat Chun	HKFC	1
9	(Hong Kong) Liu Fu Yuen	Eastern	1

== Attendances ==
Pos	Team	Total	High	Low	Average	Change
1	Tai Po	14,736	1,886	473	1,228	+84.1%
2	Eastern	12,374	2,455	454	1,031	+33.0%
3	Kitchee	11,353	1,808	511	946	−17.5%
4	HKFC	7,427	953	313	619	+34.0%
5	Lee Man	6,886	1,225	274	574	−19.8%
6	Kowloon City	6,432	776	244	536	n/a^{1}
7	Rangers	5,148	1,496	172	429	−13.9%
8	Southern	5,088	785	237	424	+27.7%
9	North District	4,567	770	175	381	−32.0%
	League total	74,011	2,455	172	685	+18.7%

Source: HKFA
Notes:
1: Team did not play in the Premier League last season
