= 2025–26 Hong Kong FA Cup =

Tournament details
- Country: Hong Kong
- Dates: 20 December 2025 – 30 May 2026
- Teams: 10

Final positions
- Champions: Tai Po
- Runners-up: Eastern District
- Champions League Two: Tai Po

Tournament statistics
- Matches played: 9
- Goals scored: 28 (3.11 per match)
- Attendance: 10,826 (1,203 per match)
- Top goal scorer: Samuel Granada (5 goals)

Awards
- Best player: Chan Siu Kwan

The 2025–26 Hong Kong FA Cup (officially the 2025–26 Kwoon Chung Bus 60th Anniversary FA Cup for sponsorship reasons) was the 51st edition of the Hong Kong FA Cup. 10 teams entered this edition. The competition was only open to clubs who participate in the 2025–26 Hong Kong Premier League, with lower division sides entering the Junior Division, a separate competition. The winners of this year's FA Cup qualified for the 2026–27 AFC Champions League Two group stage.

The champions would also receive a prize of HK$350,000, while the runners-up will be awarded HK$150,000.

Eastern were the defending champions, but were eliminated in the quarter-finals.

Tai Po became the champions for the second time after beating Eastern District in the final.

== Calendar ==
Phase	Round	Draw Date	Date	Matches	Clubs
Knockout phase	First round	28 August 2025	20 – 21 December 2025	2	10 → 8
Knockout phase	Quarter-finals	28 August 2025	7 – 8 March 2026	4	8 → 4
Knockout phase	Semi-finals	28 August 2025	23 – 24 May 2026	2	4 → 2
Knockout phase	Final	28 August 2025	30 May 2026	1	2 → 1

== Bracket ==
First round
20 December 2025
Lee Man	3
Kowloon City	0
21 December 2025
Southern	1
North District	3

Quarter-finals
7 March 2026
Tai Po (p)	1 (6)
Kitchee	1 (5)
8 March 2026
Rangers (p)	3 (3)
Lee Man	3 (1)
7 March 2026
Eastern	0 (3)
Eastern District (p)	0 (4)
8 March 2026
HKFC	1
North District	3

Semi-finals
23 May 2026
Tai Po	2
Rangers	0
24 May 2026
Eastern District (p)	2 (3)
North District	2 (1)

Final
30 May 2026
Tai Po	2
Eastern District	1

== Fixtures and results ==
=== First round ===
20 December 2025	Lee Man	3–0	Kowloon City	Tsing Yi Sports Ground
15:00	Mikael 31' (pen.); Tursunov 42'; Everton 70'	Report		Attendance: 582; Referee: Poon Chun Kit

21 December 2025	Southern	1–3	North District	Tsing Yi Sports Ground
15:00	Vinicius 4'	Report	Granada 72', 80' (pen.); Gudula 88'	Attendance: 515; Referee: Tam Ping Wun

=== Quarter-finals ===
7 March 2026	Eastern	0–0 (3–4 p)	Eastern District	Tsing Yi Sports Ground
15:00		Report		Attendance: 442; Referee: Poon Chun Kit
	Penalties
	Okubo (penalty scored); Bleda (penalty missed); Lorenz (penalty scored); Hall (penalty scored); Yiu Ho Ming (penalty missed)		Gu Bin (penalty scored); Bruno Luiz (penalty scored); Takatori (penalty scored); Li Ngai Hoi (penalty missed); Chang Hei Yin (penalty scored)

7 March 2026	Tai Po	1–1 (6–5 p)	Kitchee	Mong Kok Stadium
18:30	Fernando 10'	Report	Revilla 33'	Attendance: 1,948; Referee: Luk Kin Sun
	Penalties
	Paulinho (penalty scored); Lee Ka Ho (penalty scored); Renner (penalty missed); Chung Wai Keung (penalty scored); Marcão (penalty scored); Law Chun Ting (penalty scored); Mikael (penalty scored)		Kendy (penalty scored); Dantas (penalty scored); Revilla (penalty scored); Beattie (penalty scored); Haddow (penalty missed); Mingazow (penalty scored); Wong Ho Chun (penalty missed)

8 March 2026	Rangers	3–3 (3–1 p)	Lee Man	Sham Shui Po Sports Ground
15:00	Cortés 40'; Lau Chi Lok 88' (pen.); Cheng Tsz Sum 90+6'	Report	Gigauri 25'; Lau Yin Hong 28' (o.g.); Mikael 72'	Attendance: 619; Referee: Ho Wai Sing
	Penalties
	Lau Chi Lok (penalty scored); Cortés (penalty scored); Panigazzi (penalty scored)		Willian (penalty scored); Dudu (penalty missed); Mikael (penalty missed); Lau Ka Kiu (penalty missed)

8 March 2026	HKFC	1–3	North District	Tsing Yi Sports Ground
18:30	Kranick 62'	Report	Granada 13', 42'; Lo Kong Wai 47'	Attendance: 188; Referee: Tang Hing Fu

=== Semi-finals ===
23 May 2026	Tai Po	2–0	Rangers	Mong Kok Stadium
15:00	Valverde 51'; Sartori 69' (pen.)	Report		Attendance: 1,583; Referee: Liu Kwok Man

24 May 2026	Eastern District	2–2 (a.e.t.) (3–1 p)	North District	Mong Kok Stadium
15:00	Léo 32'; Luiz 45+2'	Report	Gudula 43'; Granada 70' (pen.)	Attendance: 1,443; Referee: Luk Kin Sun
	Penalties
	Na Yun-ho (penalty missed); Takatori (penalty scored); Bianconi (penalty scored); Yuel (penalty scored)		Granada (penalty scored); Gudula (penalty missed); Vinicius (penalty missed); Arboleda (penalty missed)

=== Final ===
30 May 2026	Tai Po	2–1	Eastern District	Mong Kok Stadium
15:00	Chan Siu Kwan 14', 45+2'	Report	Yuel 88' (pen.)	Attendance: 3,506; Referee: Tam Ping Wun

== Top scorers ==
Rank	Player	Club	Goals
1	(Brazil) Samuel Granada	North District	5
2	(Brazil) Weverton Gudula	North District	2
2	(Brazil) Mikael	Lee Man	2
2	(Hong Kong) Chan Siu Kwan	Tai Po	2
5	16 players		1
