= 2025–26 Hong Kong Senior Shield =

Tournament details
- Country: Hong Kong
- Dates: 3 September 2025 – 18 February 2026
- Teams: 10

Final positions
- Champions: Tai Po
- Runners-up: Rangers

Tournament statistics
- Matches played: 9
- Goals scored: 37 (4.11 per match)
- Attendance: 11,053 (1,228 per match)
- Top goal scorer: Yu Okubo (4 goals)

Awards
- Best player: Yip Ka Yu

2025–26 Hong Kong Senior Shield was the 122nd season of the Hong Kong Senior Shield. 10 teams entered this edition, with 2 games being played in the First round before the quarter-finals stage. The competition was only open to teams that played in the 2025–26 Hong Kong Premier League.

The champions received HK$150,000 in prize money while the runners up received HK$50,000. The best player of the final received a HK$10,000 bonus. In addition, the two losing teams in semi-finals received HK$20,000 while the remaining teams received HK$5,000.

Eastern were the defending champions. Tai Po became the champions for the 2nd time after beating Rangers in the final.

== Calendar ==
Stage	Round	Draw Date	Date	Matches	Clubs
Knockout	First round	28 August 2025	3 – 10 September 2025	2	10 → 8
Knockout	Quarter-finals	28 August 2025	27 – 28 September 2025	4	8 → 4
Knockout	Semi-finals	28 August 2025	7 – 8 February 2026	2	4 → 2
Knockout	Final	28 August 2025	18 February 2026	1	2 → 1

== Bracket ==
First round
10 September 2025
Tai Po	3
Southern	1
3 September 2025
Kowloon City (a.e.t.)	2*
Eastern District	1

Quarter-finals
28 September 2025
Kitchee	2
North District	3
27 September 2025
Lee Man	2 (1)
Tai Po (p)	2 (3)
27 September 2025
Eastern	3
HKFC	0
28 September 2025
Rangers	4
Kowloon City	0

Semi-finals
7 February 2026
North District	2
Tai Po	3
8 February 2026
Eastern	1
Rangers	3

Final
18 February 2026
Tai Po (a.e.t.)	4*
Rangers	1

== Fixtures and results ==
=== First round ===
3 September 2025	Kowloon City	2–1 (a.e.t.)	Eastern District	Mong Kok Stadium
20:00	Park Min-gyu 11'; Jadson 102'	Report	Hélio 39'	Attendance: 510; Referee: Wong Po Sing

10 September 2025	Tai Po	3–1	Southern	Mong Kok Stadium
20:00	Valverde 37', 73' (pen.); Temelkovski 88'	Report	Acosta 84'	Attendance: 633; Referee: Wong Wai Lun

=== Quarter-finals ===
27 September 2025	Eastern	3–0	HKFC	Tai Po Sports Ground
15:00	Okubo 81' (pen.), 84', 87'	Report		Attendance: 226; Referee: Luk Kin Sun

27 September 2025	Lee Man	2–2 (1–3 p)	Tai Po	Mong Kok Stadium
18:30	Everton 61'; Baffoe 65'	Report	Temelkovski 13'; Sartori 45'	Attendance: 1,626; Referee: Poon Chun Kit
	Penalties
	Mikael (penalty missed); Braunshtain (penalty scored); Tachibana (penalty missed); Baffoe (penalty missed)		Fernando (penalty scored); Renner (penalty scored); Chan Siu Kwan (penalty missed); Dujardin (penalty missed); Cividini (penalty scored)

28 September 2025	Rangers	4–0	Kowloon City	North District Sports Ground
15:00	Panigazzi 6', 65'; Lau Chi Lok 45+3', 87'	Report		Attendance: 284; Referee: Yu Kin Fung

28 September 2025	Kitchee	2–3	North District	Tsing Yi Sports Ground
18:30	Revilla 45', 45+4' (pen.)	Report	Vinicius 40'; Gudula 80' (pen.); Granada 82'	Attendance: 451; Referee: Wong Wai Lun

=== Semi-finals ===
7 February 2026	North District	2–3	Tai Po	Mong Kok Stadium
15:00	Arboleda 6'; Páez 32'	Report	Páez 35' (o.g.); Paulinho 74', 80'	Attendance: 1,603; Referee: Yu Kin Fung

8 February 2026	Eastern	1–3	Rangers	Mong Kok Stadium
15:00	Okubo 37' (pen.)	Report	Ibrahim 26'; Cortés 30'; Lau Chi Lok 78'	Attendance: 982; Referee: Wong Wai Lun

=== Final ===
18 February 2026	Tai Po	4–1 (a.e.t.)	Rangers	Mong Kok Stadium
15:00	R. Dujardin 13'; Paulinho 103'; Renner 113', 119'	Report	Ibrahim 64'	Attendance: 4,738; Referee: Ho Wai Sing

== Top scorers ==
Rank	Player	Club	Goals
1	(Japan) Yu Okubo	Eastern	4
2	(Hong Kong) Lau Chi Lok	Rangers	3
2	(Brazil) Paulinho Simionato	Tai Po	3
4	(Ghana) Nassam Ibrahim	Rangers	2
4	(Argentina) Matias Panigazzi	Rangers	2
4	(Brazil) Michel Renner	Tai Po	2
4	(Spain) Adrián Revilla	Kitchee	2
4	(Australia) James Temelkovski	Tai Po	2
4	(Brazil) Patrick Valverde	Tai Po	2
10	14 players		1
