= 2025–26 Hong Kong League Cup =

14th edition of the Hong Kong League Cup

Tournament details
- Country: Hong Kong
- Dates: 6 September 2025 – 7 April 2026
- Teams: 10

Final positions
- Champions: Lee Man (1st title)
- Runners-up: Kitchee

Tournament statistics
- Matches played: 9
- Goals scored: 26 (2.89 per match)
- Attendance: 9,114 (1,013 per match)
- Top goal scorer: James Temelkovski (2 goals)

Awards
- Best player: Dostonbek Tursunov

The 2025–26 Hong Kong League Cup is the 14th edition of the Hong Kong League Cup. 10 teams entered this edition, with 2 games being played in the First Round before the quarter-finals stage. The competition was only open to teams that played in the 2025–26 Hong Kong Premier League.

Lee Man became the champions for the first time after beating Kitchee in the final.

== Calendar ==
Stage	Round	Draw Date	Date	Matches	Clubs
Knockout	First Round	28 August 2025	6 September – 4 October 2025	2	10 → 8
Knockout	Quarter-finals	28 August 2025	11 October – 16 November 2025	4	8 → 4
Knockout	Semi-finals	28 August 2025	11 – 18 March 2026	2	4 → 2
Knockout	Final	28 August 2025	7 April 2026	1	2 → 1

== Bracket ==
First Round
4 October 2025
Southern	1
Eastern District	4
6 September 2025
Tai Po	3
Eastern	1

Quarter-finals
11 October 2025
Kitchee	3
Rangers	0
12 October 2025
Kowloon City	2
Eastern District	1
16 November 2025
North District	1
Lee Man (a.e.t.)	2*
15 November 2025
HKFC	0
Tai Po	3

Semi-finals
18 March 2026
Kitchee	1
Kowloon City	0
11 March 2026
Lee Man	1
Tai Po	0

Final
7 April 2026
Kitchee	1
Lee Man	2

== Fixtures and results ==
=== First Round ===
6 September 2025	Tai Po	3–1	Eastern	Tsing Yi Sports Ground
16:00	Temelkovski 50', 90+2'; Sartori 54' (pen.)	Report	Okubo 38' (pen.)	Attendance: 705; Referee: Poon Chun Kit

4 October 2025	Southern	1–4	Eastern District	Tai Po Sports Ground
15:00	Acosta 29'	Report	Andrić 46'; Manzoki 70'; Takatori 79'; Razeek 90+5'	Attendance: 272; Referee: Wong Wai Lun

=== Quarter-finals ===
11 October 2025	Kitchee	3–0	Rangers	Mong Kok Stadium
15:00	Kanda 47'; Kendy 76'; Kim Shin-wook 90+2'	Report		Attendance: 1,035; Referee: Poon Chun Kit

12 October 2025	Kowloon City	2–1	Eastern District	Hammer Hill Road Sports Ground
15:00	Kessi 29'; Kayron 64'	Report	Léo 90+5'	Attendance: 406; Referee: Tang Hing Fu

15 November 2025	HKFC	0–3	Tai Po	Mong Kok Stadium
15:00		Report	Valverde 15'; Paulinho 42'; Pérez-Doyle 67' (o.g.)	Attendance: 404; Referee: Poon Chun Kit

16 November 2026	North District	1–2 (a.e.t.)	Lee Man	Hammer Hill Road Sports Ground
15:00	Abadía 36'	Report	Tursunov 52'; Poon Pui Hin 103'	Attendance: 482; Referee: Liu Kwok Man

=== Semi-finals ===
11 March 2026	Lee Man	1–0	Tai Po	Mong Kok Stadium
20:00	Gigauri 62'	Report		Attendance: 1,261; Referee: Tang Hing Fu

18 March 2026	Kitchee	1–0	Kowloon City	Mong Kok Stadium
20:00	Martínez 34' (pen.)	Report		Attendance: 779; Referee: Poon Chun Kit

=== Final ===
7 April 2026	Kitchee	1–2	Lee Man	Mong Kok Stadium
15:00	Illarramendi 63'	Report	Everton 49'; Baffoe 58'	Attendance: 3,770; Referee: Tam Ping Wun

== Top scorers ==
Rank	Player	Club	Goals
1	(Australia) James Temelkovski	Tai Po	2
2	23 players		1
