= 2024–25 Hong Kong FA Cup =

Tournament details
- Country: Hong Kong
- Dates: 2 February – 31 May 2025
- Teams: 9

Final positions
- Champions: Eastern
- Runners-up: Rangers
- Champions League Two: Eastern

Tournament statistics
- Matches played: 8
- Goals scored: 29 (3.63 per match)
- Attendance: 9,607 (1,201 per match)
- Top goal scorer: Noah Baffoe (7 goals)

Awards
- Best player: Noah Baffoe

The 2024–25 Hong Kong FA Cup (officially the 2024–25 Kwoon Chung Bus 60th Anniversary FA Cup for sponsorship reasons) was the 50th edition of the Hong Kong FA Cup. 9 teams entered this edition. The competition was only open to clubs who participate in the 2024–25 Hong Kong Premier League, with lower division sides entering the Junior Division, a separate competition. The winners of this year's FA Cup qualified for the 2025–26 AFC Champions League Two group stage.

The champions would also receive a prize of HK$350,000, while the runners-up will be awarded HK$150,000.

Eastern successfully defended the title of the competition and became the champions for the seventh time after beating Rangers in the final.

== Calendar ==
Phase	Round	Draw Date	Date	Matches	Clubs
Knockout phase	First round	15 January 2025	2 February 2025	1	9 → 8
Knockout phase	Quarter-finals	15 January 2025	1 – 2 March 2025	4	8 → 4
Knockout phase	Semi-finals	15 January 2025	19 – 20 April 2025	2	4 → 2
Knockout phase	Final	15 January 2025	31 May 2025	1	2 → 1

== Bracket ==
First round
2 February 2025
**Rangers (a.e.t.)**	**2***
North District	1

Quarter-finals
2 March 2025
**HKFC**	**2**
Southern	0
1 March 2025
Lee Man	1
**Rangers**	**2**
1 March 2025
Kitchee	2
**Tai Po (a.e.t.)**	**3***
2 March 2025
**Eastern**	**3**
Kowloon City	1

Semi-finals
19 April 2025
HKFC	1
**Rangers**	**4**
20 April 2025
Tai Po	1
**Eastern (a.e.t.)**	**2***

Final
31 May 2025
Rangers	1
**Eastern**	**3**

Bold = winner
* = after extra time, ( ) = penalty shootout score

== Fixtures and results ==
Times are in Hong Kong Time (UTC+08:00).

=== First round ===
2 February 2025	**Rangers**	**2–1** (a.e.t.)	North District	Tai Po
15:00	Ibrahim 45+3'; Lau Chi Lok 103'	Report	Chulapa 21'	Stadium: Tai Po Sports Ground; Attendance: 268; Referee: Wong Wai Lun

=== Quarter-finals ===
1 March 2025	Kitchee	**2–3** (a.e.t.)	**Tai Po**	Mong Kok
15:00	Fernando 14'; Temirov 26'	Report	Chan Siu Kwan 39', 83', 115'	Stadium: Mong Kok Stadium; Attendance: 1,648; Referee: Lau Fong Hei

1 March 2025	Lee Man	**1–2**	**Rangers**	Tsing Yi
18:30	Anier 58'	Report	Luizinho 32'; Hayashi 85'	Stadium: Tsing Yi Sports Ground; Attendance: 394; Referee: Luk Kin Sun

2 March 2025	**Eastern**	**3–1**	Kowloon City	Sham Shui Po
15:00	Baffoe 21', 25'; Sá 48'	Report	Kayron 66'	Stadium: Sham Shui Po Sports Ground; Attendance: 621; Referee: Poon Chun Kit

2 March 2025	**HKFC**	**2–0**	Southern	Tsing Yi
18:30	Léo 29' (pen.); Bennie 88'	Report		Stadium: Tsing Yi Sports Ground; Attendance: 209; Referee: Tam Ping Wun

=== Semi-finals ===
19 April 2025	HKFC	**1–4**	**Rangers**	Mong Kok
15:00 UTC+8	Léo 54'	Report	Lau Chi Lok 16'; Li Wing Ho 31'; Ansah 45+2'; Biteco 62'	Stadium: Mong Kok Stadium; Attendance: 882; Referee: Poon Chun Kit

20 April 2025	Tai Po	**1–2** (a.e.t.)	**Eastern**	Mong Kok
15:00 UTC+8	Renner 45+2'	Report	Baffoe 30', 112' (pen.)	Stadium: Mong Kok Stadium; Attendance: 2,193; Referee: Yu Kin Fung

=== Final ===
31 May 2025	Rangers	**1–3**	**Eastern**	Mong Kok
15:00 UTC+8	Lau Chi Lok 9'	Report	Baffoe 80', 81', 84'	Stadium: Mong Kok Stadium; Attendance: 3,392; Referee: Tam Ping Wun

== Top scorers ==
Rank	Player	Club	Goals
1	(Spain) Noah Baffoe	Eastern	7
2	(Hong Kong) Chan Siu Kwan	Tai Po	3
2	(Hong Kong) Lau Chi Lok	Rangers	3
4	(Brazil) Léo	HKFC	2
5	14 players		1
