= Marcos Gondra =

Spanish footballer (born 1987)

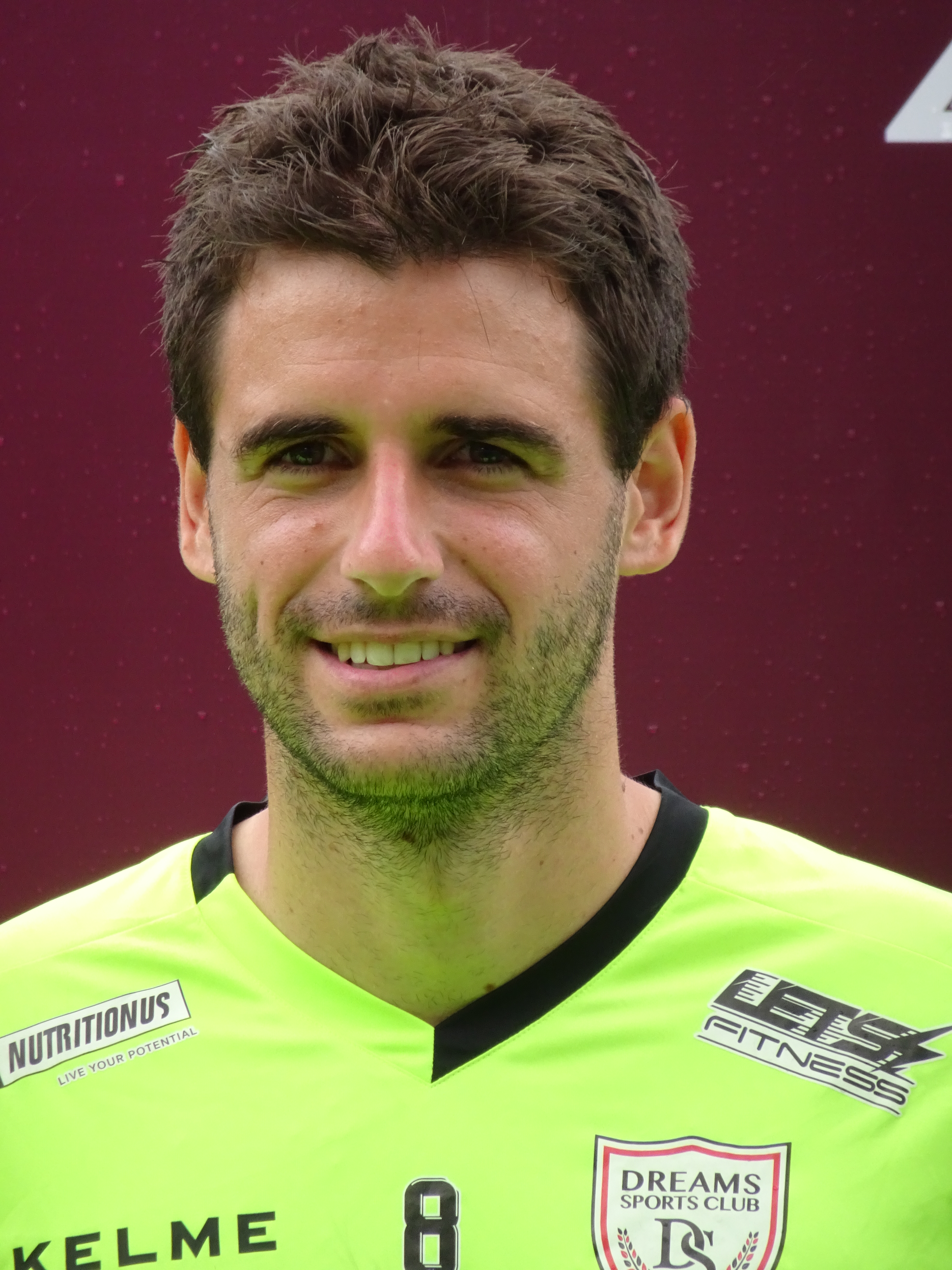

Personal information
- Full name: Marcos Gondra Krug
- Date of birth: 1 January 1987 (age 39)
- Place of birth: Mundaka, Spain
- Height: 1.87 m (6 ft 2 in)
- Positions: Central midfielder; centre back

Team information
- Current team: Eastern
- Number: 27

Youth career
- 1998–1999: Athletic Bilbao
- 1999–2006: Alavés

Senior career*
Years	Team	Apps	(Gls)
2006–2009	Alavés B		
2008–2009	→ Atlético Ciudad (loan)	22	(0)
2009–2010	Amurrio	38	(9)
2010–2011	Portugalete	38	(4)
2011–2012	Santurtzi		
2012	Syrianska	5	(0)
2012	Balmaseda		
2013–2014	Moss	36	(8)
2014–2015	Balmaseda	?	(2)
2015–2017	Raufoss	54	(7)
2017	Isola Capo Rizzuto	12	(2)
2018	Gjøvik-Lyn	12	(2)
2018–2019	Dreams	18	(8)
2019	Pegasus	6	(1)
2020	Gernika	5	(3)
2020–2021	Lorca Deportiva	18	(2)
2021–	Eastern	90	(30)
- * Club domestic league appearances and goals as of 22 November 2026

Marcos Gondra Krug (born 1 January 1987) is a Spanish footballer who plays for Hong Kong Premier League club Eastern.

== Club career ==
In August 2013, Gondra signed for 2. divisjon side Moss FK alongside fellow Spaniard Jorge Rodriguez. In January 2014, Gondra extended his stay at Moss for the 2014 season. For the 2015 season, Gondra joined fellow 2. Divisjon side Raufoss IL.

After spells at FC Isola Capo Rizzuto in the Italian Serie D and FK Gjøvik-Lyn in Norway, Gondra joined Hong Kong Premier League club Dreams on 13 July 2018. He left the club on 31 May 2019 after one season.

On 1 June 2019, it was reported that Gondra would join fellow Hong Kong club Pegasus. The relationship between player and club quickly deteriorated, culminating in mutual termination of his contract on 6 January 2020. Pegasus claimed that Gondra would often ask to withdraw from the starting lineup due to injury at the last minute, however, the club would be forced to play him in spite of this due to lack of advance notice.

Gondra then returned to Spain and signed with Gernika Club. He played for the club for one year, before he signed with Lorca Deportiva at the end of December 2020.

On 14 September 2021, Gondra returned to Hong Kong and joined Eastern.

== Career statistics ==
=== Club ===
As of match played 30 October 2016

Appearances and goals by club, season and competition
Club	Season	League			National Cup		Other Cup		Continental		Total	
Club	Season	Division	Apps	Goals	Apps	Goals	Apps	Goals	Apps	Goals	Apps	Goals
Syrianska	2012	Allsvenskan	5	0	0	0	–		–		5	0
Moss	2013	2. divisjon	10	1	0	0	–		–		10	1
Moss	2014	2. divisjon	26	7	2	0	–		–		28	7
Moss	Total		36	8	2	0	-	-	-	-	38	8
Raufoss	2015	2. divisjon	25	3	2	1	–		–		27	4
Raufoss	2016	OBOS-ligaen	29	4	1	0	–		–		30	4
Raufoss	Total		54	7	3	1	-	-	-	-	57	7
Dreams Metro	2018–19	Hong Kong Premier League	18	8	3	1	5	2	0	0	26	11
Pegasus	2019–20	Hong Kong Premier League	6	1	0	0	1	0	0	0	7	1
Lorca Deportiva	2020–21	Segunda División B	18	2	0	0	0	0	0	0	18	2
Eastern Sports Club	2021–22	Hong Kong Premier League	4	1	2	0	7	1	3	0	16	2
Eastern Sports Club	2022–23	Hong Kong Premier League	16	2	2	0	11	2	0	0	29	4
Eastern Sports Club	2023–24	Hong Kong Premier League	18	6	2	0	13	3	0	0	33	9
Eastern Sports Club	2024–25	Hong Kong Premier League	22	10	2	0	6	0	5	2	35	12
Eastern Sports Club	Total		60	19	8	0	37	6	8	2	113	27
Career total			222	48	16	2	43	8	8	2	289	66

== Honour ==
Eastern

- Hong Kong FA Cup: 2023–24, 2024–25
- Hong Kong Senior Shield: 2024–25
