= Gabriel Cividini =

Brazilian footballer (born 1994)

Personal information
- Full name: Gabriel Roberto Cividini Moreira
- Date of birth: 4 November 1994 (age 32)
- Place of birth: São Paulo, Brazil
- Height: 1.89 m (6 ft 2 in)
- Position: Centre back

Team information
- Current team: Tai Po
- Number: 33

Senior career*
| Years | Team | Apps | (Gls) |
| 2015 | Bragantino | 1 | (0) |
| 2016 | Paulista | 0 | (0) |
| 2017–2019 | Atibaia | 25 | (1) |
| 2020 | Nacional | 17 | (2) |
| 2021 | Bangu | 7 | (1) |
| 2021 | Treze | 6 | (0) |
| 2022 | Juventus | 12 | (0) |
| 2022– | Tai Po | 80 | (9) |
- * Club domestic league appearances and goals as of 21 November 2026

Gabriel Roberto Cividini Moreira (born 4 November 1994) is a Brazilian professional footballer who currently plays as a centre back for Hong Kong Premier League club Tai Po.

== Club career ==
=== Tai Po ===
On 8 August 2022, it was announced that Cividini had joined Hong Kong Premier League club Tai Po.

On 27 August 2022, Cividini made his debut for the club in a HKPL match against Eastern.

In the 2022–23 season, Cividini has made 17 league appearances and scored a goal for the club. His excellent performance on the field have earned him a spot in the Hong Kong Top Footballer Awards.

== Honours ==
Tai Po

- Hong Kong FA Cup: 2025–26
- Hong Kong Premier League: 2024–25
- Hong Kong Senior Shield: 2025–26
