= Law Chun Ting =

Association football player

Law Chun Ting 羅振庭
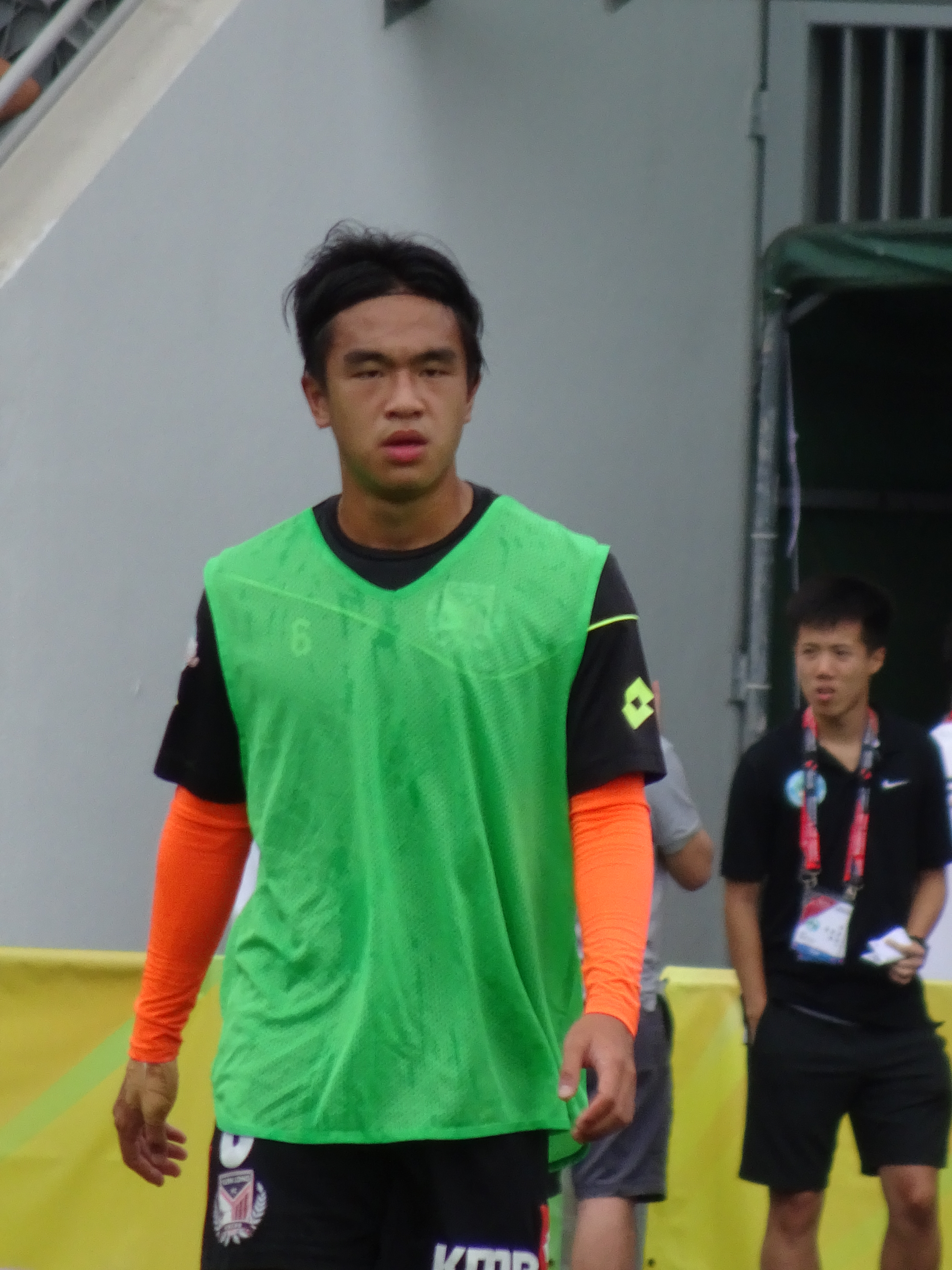

Personal information
- Full name: Law Chun Ting
- Date of birth: 11 January 1996 (age 30)
- Place of birth: Hong Kong
- Height: 1.61 m (5 ft 3 in)
- Position: Right back

Team information
- Current team: Eastern
- Number: 6

Youth career
- 2008–2010: Eastern
- 2011–2015: BSix Sixth Form College

Senior career*
Years	Team	Apps	(Gls)
2015–2020	Yuen Long	54	(2)
2020–2021	Pegasus	15	(0)
2021–2022	Yuen Long	13	(0)
2022–2026	Tai Po	63	(2)
2026–	Eastern	4	(0)

International career^{‡}
2016	Hong Kong U-20	2	(0)
2017	Hong Kong U-23	2	(0)
- * Club domestic league appearances and goals as of 8 November 2026 ‡ National team caps and goals as of 18 October 2018

Law Chun Ting (Chinese: 羅振庭; born 11 January 1996) is a Hong Kong professional footballer who currently plays as a right back for Hong Kong Premier League club Eastern.

== Club career ==
In 2011, Law won a scholarship to study at BSix Sixth Form College, following in the footsteps of Tan Chun Lok and Leung Nok Hang.

In October 2015, Law returned to Hong Kong to sign his first professional contract with Hong Kong Premier League club Yuen Long.

On 17 October 2020, Law was confirmed as a Pegasus player.

On 8 August 2022, Law joined Tai Po.

On 21 July 2026, Law joined Eastern.

== International career ==
On 15 July 2016, Law was named to the Hong Kong U-21 preliminary squad for a tournament in Singapore.

In July 2017, he was selected for the Hong Kong U-23 for the 2018 AFC U-23 Championship qualification tournament in North Korea. He made his debut for the Hong Kong B squad in October 2017 for the Interport Cup against Macau, earning praise from his future Yuen Long manager Kowk Kar Lok.

In October 2018, Law was called up to the senior Hong Kong squad by Gary White for a friendly against Indonesia but was an unused substitute.

== Honours ==
Yuen Long

- Hong Kong Senior Shield: 2017–18

Tai Po

- Hong Kong Premier League: 2024–25
- Hong Kong FA Cup: 2025–26
- Hong Kong Senior Shield: 2025–26
