= Daisuke Fukagawa =

Japanese footballer (born 1999)

Personal information
- Date of birth: 2 June 1999 (age 27)
- Place of birth: Chiba, Japan
- Height: 1.81 m (5 ft 11 in)
- Position: Defender

Team information
- Current team: Kochi United
- Number: 37

Youth career
- –2017: JEF United Chiba

College career
Years	Team	Apps	(Gls)
2018–2021	Nippon Sport Science University		

Senior career*
Years	Team	Apps	(Gls)
2022–2025	Iwate Grulla Morioka	51	(2)
2025	Hong Kong Rangers	2	(0)
2025–	Kochi United SC	24	(1)
- * Club domestic league appearances and goals as of 1 January 2026

Daisuke Fukagawa (深川 大輔, Fukagawa Daisuke; born 2 June 1999) is a Japanese professional footballer who plays as a defender for J3 League club Kochi United.

== Club career ==
On 4 January 2025, Fukagawa joined Hong Kong Premier League club Rangers. After a very brief stint with Rangers, he left to join Kochi United SC.

== Career statistics ==
=== Club ===
As of match played 19 January 2025.

Appearances and goals by club, season and competition
Club	Season	League			Emperor's Cup		J.League Cup		Other		Total	
Club	Season	Division	Apps	Goals	Apps	Goals	Apps	Goals	Apps	Goals	Apps	Goals
Iwate Grulla Morioka	2022	J2 League	16	2	1	0	0	0	0	0	17	2
Iwate Grulla Morioka	2023	J3 League	7	0	2	0	0	0	0	0	9	0
Iwate Grulla Morioka	2024	J3 League	28	0	2	1	2	0	0	0	32	1
Iwate Grulla Morioka	Total		51	2	5	1	2	0	0	0	58	3
Rangers	2024–25	Hong Kong Premier League	2	0	0	0	0	0	0	0	2	0
Career total			53	2	5	1	2	0	0	0	60	3
