= Patrick Valverde =

Brazilian footballer (born 1998)

Personal information
- Full name: Patrick Valverde Peral Lopez
- Date of birth: 9 March 1998 (age 28)
- Place of birth: Rio de Janeiro, Brazil
- Height: 1.74 m (5 ft 9 in)
- Position: Attacking midfielder

Youth career
- –2018: Flamengo
- 2018–2020: Santos

Senior career*
Years	Team	Apps	(Gls)
2020	Red Bull Brasil	0	(0)
2021	→ Portuguesa-RJ (loan)	0	(0)
2021	→ Caldense (loan)	11	(3)
2022	Portuguesa-RJ	12	(0)
2022–2023	POX	13	(2)
2023–2024	Olympiakos Nicosia	11	(1)
2024–2025	Omonia Aradippou	6	(0)
2025–2026	Tai Po	23	(11)

International career^{‡}
2013	Brazil U16	1	(0)
- * Club domestic league appearances and goals as of 17 May 2026 ‡ National team caps and goals as of 11 December 2013

Patrick Valverde Peral Lopez is a Brazilian professional footballer who plays as an attacking midfielder.

== Club career ==
Valverde was a youth product of Flamengo, with whom he won the Copa São Paulo de Futebol Júnior twice, in 2016 and 2018 respectively. In 2018, he joined Santos' academy.

In February 2020, Santos agreed to terminate Valverde's contract two months before its expiration, allowing him to join Red Bull Brasil on a two-years contract.

In June 2021, he joined Série D club Caldense on loan for the rest of the 2021 season.

He then signed for Portuguesa-RJ on a permanent deal, before moving to Cyprus, joining Second Division side PO Xylotymbou.

On 7 July 2023, Valverde moved to Olympiakos Nicosia, he signed a one-year contract with the club, with an option to extend his contract for an extra year.

On 24 June 2024, Valverde signed for Cypriot First Division club Omonia Aradippou.

On 2 January 2025, Valverde left Omonia Aradippou after a mutual termination of his contract, and signed for Hong Kong Premier League club Tai Po.

== Career statistics ==
=== Club ===
As of 2 January 2025

Club	Season	League			State league		National Cup		League Cup		Other		Total	
Club	Season	Division	Apps	Goals	Apps	Goals	Apps	Goals	Apps	Goals	Apps	Goals	Apps	Goals
Red Bull Brasil	2020	—			10 (Note: Appearances in Campeonato Paulista Série A2)	3	0	0	—		—		10	3
Portuguesa-RJ (loan)	2021	—			—		0	0	—		1 (Note: Appearance in Campeonato Carioca play-off)	0	1	0
Caldense (loan)	2021	Campeonato Brasileiro Série D	11	3	—		0	0	—		0	0	11	3
Portuguesa-RJ	2022	Campeonato Brasileiro Série D	12	0	10 (Note: Appearance in Campeonato Carioca)	1	4	1	—		2 (Note: Appearance in Campeonato Carioca play-off)	0	28	2
POX	2022–23	Cypriot Second Division	13	2	—		0	0	—		6 (Note: Appearances in Second Division relegation rounds)	2	19	4
Olympiakos Nicosia	2023–24	Cypriot Second Division	11	1	—		2	1	—		10 (Note: Appearances in Second Division promotion rounds)	1	23	3
Omonia Aradippou	2024–25	Cypriot First Division	6	0	—		1	0	—		0	0	7	0
Tai Po	2024–25	Hong Kong Premier League	0	0	—		0	0	0	0	0	0	0	0
Career total			53	6	20	4	7	2	0	0	19	3	99	15

== Honours ==
Tai Po

- Hong Kong FA Cup: 2025–26
- Hong Kong Premier League: 2024–25
- Hong Kong Senior Shield: 2025–26
