= James Temelkovski =

Australian soccer player (born 1998)

Personal information
- Date of birth: 26 April 1998 (age 28)
- Place of birth: Australia
- Height: 1.94 m (6 ft 4 in)
- Position: Forward

Team information
- Current team: Rockdale Ilinden

Youth career
- 2015–2016: Sydney United 58
- 2018: SD Huesca

Senior career*
Years	Team	Apps	(Gls)
2017	Rockdale Ilinden	2	(0)
2018–2019	Sutherland Sharks	0	(0)
2020–2021	Adelaide croatia soccer club raiders	11	(7)
2022	St Albans Dinamo	7	(1)
2023	North Eastern MetroStars	25	(32)
2024	Marconi Stallions	27	(22)
2024–2025	Western Sydney Wanderers	8	(1)
2025–2026	Tai Po	26	(12)
2026–	Rockdale Ilinden	2	(2)
- * Club domestic league appearances and goals as of 17 May 2026

James Temelkovski (born 26 April 1998) is an Australian professional soccer player who plays as a forward for Rockdale Ilinden in the NPL NSW.

== Club career ==
Temelkovski started his career with Australian side Rockdale Ilinden in 2017, where he made three league appearances and scored zero goals. Following his stint there, he joined the youth academy of Spanish side SD Huesca in 2018. The same year, he signed for Australian side Sutherland Sharks, before returning to Australian side Rockdale Ilinden one year later. During the summer of 2022, he signed for Australian side St Albans Dinamo. Subsequently, he signed for Australian side North Eastern MetroStars in 2023, where he scored twenty-six league goals.

Afterwards, Temelkovski signed for Australian side Marconi Stallions, where he scored eighteen league goals. Australian newspaper The Daily Telegraph wrote in 2024 that he "quickly established himself as a player to watch, regularly scoring bangers for the Stallions and leading the club’s premiership charge" while playing for them. Six months later, he signed for Australian side Western Sydney Wanderers, where he made eight league appearances and scored one goal.

Ahead of the 2025–26 season, Temelkovski signed for Hong Kong Premier League club Tai Po, where he scored four goals in his first four appearances.

== Honours ==
Tai Po

- Hong Kong Senior Shield: 2025–26
