= Dostonbek Tursunov =

Uzbekistan footballer

Personal information
- Full name: Dostonbek Tursunov
- Date of birth: 13 June 1995 (age 31)
- Place of birth: Oltiariq, Uzbekistan
- Height: 1.87 m (6 ft 2 in)
- Position: Centre back

Team information
- Current team: Lee Man
- Number: 44

Senior career*
Years	Team	Apps	(Gls)
2013–2015	Neftchi Fergana	2	(0)
2016	Kokand 1912	24	(2)
2017	Metallurg Bekabad	7	(1)
2017–2018	Neftchi Fergana	33	(1)
2019	Renofa Yamaguchi	17	(0)
2020	Busan IPark	16	(1)
2021–2022	Chongqing Liangjiang Athletic	9	(2)
2022–2023	Pakhtakor	19	(2)
2024	Esteghlal Khuzestan	12	(0)
2025	Khorazm	14	(0)
2025–	Lee Man	24	(4)

International career^{‡}
2014	Uzbekistan U19	5	(0)
2015	Uzbekistan U20	5	(0)
2017–2018	Uzbekistan U23	24	(4)
2018–2021	Uzbekistan	8	(1)
Medal record
Representing Uzbekistan
Men's football
AFC U-23 Championship
Gold medal – first place	2018 China	Team
- * Club domestic league appearances and goals as of 20 November 2026 ‡ National team caps and goals as of 12 October 2021 (UTC)

Dostonbek Tursunov (Russian: Достонбек Турсунов; born 13 June 1995) is an Uzbek professional footballer who currently plays as a centre back for Hong Kong Premier League club Lee Man and the Uzbekistan national team.

== Club career ==
On 9 August 2025, Tursunov joined Hong Kong Premier League club Lee Man.

== International career ==
Tursunov was included in Uzbekistan's squad for the 2019 AFC Asian Cup in the United Arab Emirates.

== Career statistics ==
=== Club ===
As of 1 December 2023

Appearances and goals by club, season and competition
Club	Season	League			National Cup		Continental		Other		Total	
Club	Season	Division	Apps	Goals	Apps	Goals	Apps	Goals	Apps	Goals	Apps	Goals
Neftchi Fergana	2014	Uzbek League	0	0	0	0	—		—		0	0
Neftchi Fergana	2015	Uzbek League	2	0	0	0	—		—		2	0
Neftchi Fergana	Total		2	0	0	0	—		—		2	0
Kokand 1912	2016	Uzbek League	24	2	4	0	—		—		28	2
Metallurg Bekabad	2017	Uzbek League	7	1	2	2	—		—		9	3
Neftchi Fergana	2017	Uzbek League	7	0	1	0	—		—		8	0
Neftchi Fergana	2018	Uzbekistan Super League	26	1	1	0	—		—		27	1
Neftchi Fergana	Total		33	1	2	0	—		—		35	1
Renofa Yamaguchi	2019	J2 League	17	0	2	0	—		—		19	0
Busan IPark	2020	K League 1	16	1	2	0	—		—		18	1
Chongqing Liangjiang Athletic	2021	Chinese Super League	9	2	0	0	—		—		9	2
Pakhtakor	2022	Uzbekistan Super League	7	0	1	0	—		—		8	0
Pakhtakor	2023	Uzbekistan Super League	12	2	0	0	2	0	—		14	2
Pakhtakor	Total		19	2	1	0	2	0	—		22	2
Career total			127	9	13	2	2	0	—		142	11

=== International ===
As of 12 October 2021

Uzbekistan
Year	Apps	Goals
2018	3	0
2019	2	1
2020	0	0
2021	3	0
Total	8	1

=== International goals ===
Scores and results list Uzbekistan's goal tally first.

No.	Date	Venue	Opponent	Score	Result	Competition
1.	7 June 2019	Milliy Stadium, Tashkent, Uzbekistan	North Korea	4–0	4–0	Friendly

== Honours ==
=== Club ===
Pakhtakor

- Uzbekistan Super League (2): 2022, 2023

Lee Man

- Hong Kong League Cup: 2025–26

=== International ===
Uzbekistan U23

- AFC U-23 Championship: 2018
