= Noah Baffoe =

Ghanaian footballer (born 1993)

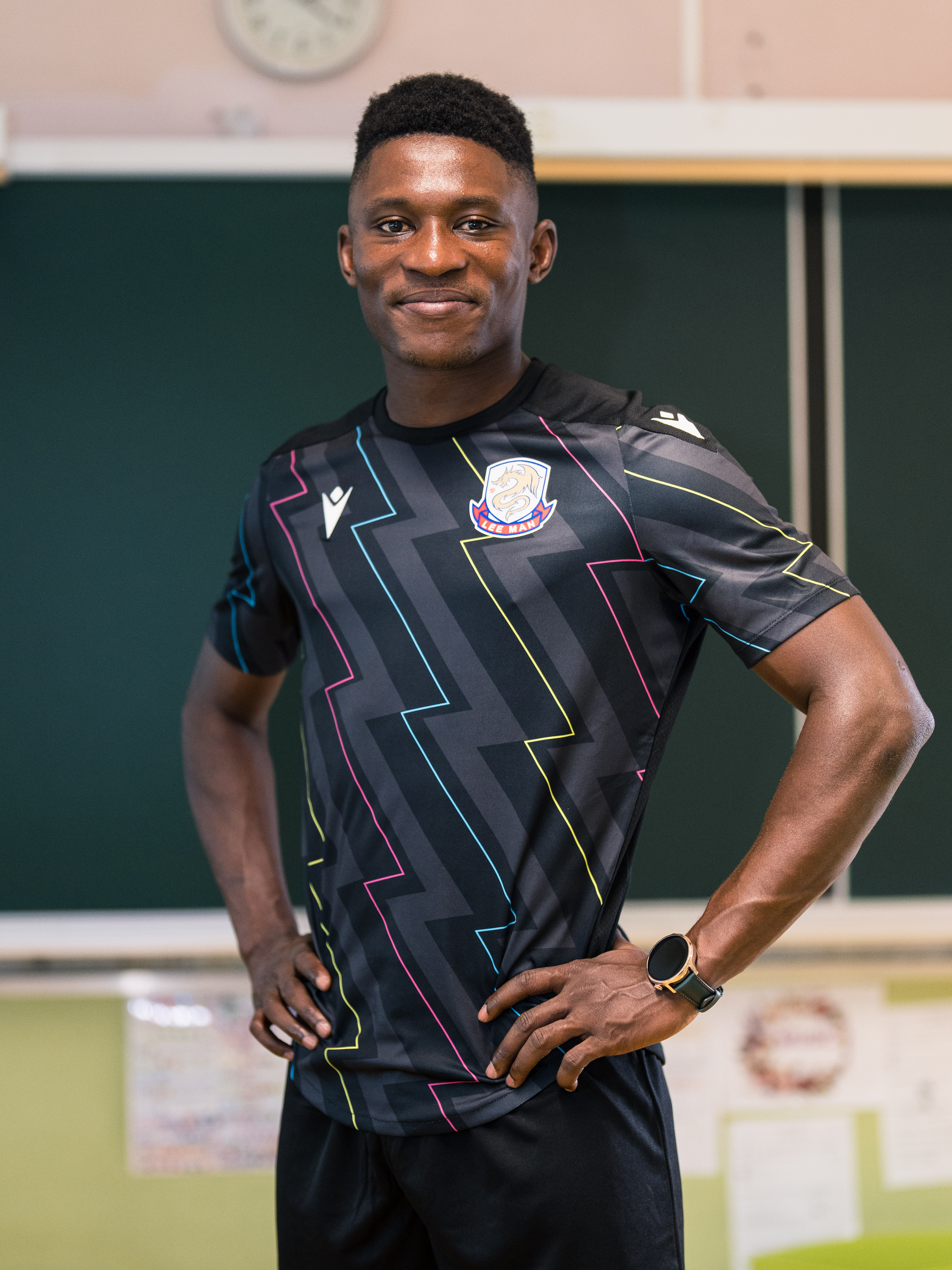

Personal information
- Full name: Noah Koffi Baffoe Donkor
- Date of birth: 21 May 1993 (age 33)
- Place of birth: Accra, Ghana
- Height: 1.78 m (5 ft 10 in)
- Position: Striker

Team information
- Current team: Lee Man
- Number: 7

Youth career
- Font dels Capellans
- Manresa

Senior career*
Years	Team	Apps	(Gls)
2012–2016	Manresa		(62)
2016–2018	Sant Julià	36	(16)
2018–2019	Manresa	49	(22)
2019–2020	Girona B	15	(9)
2020–2023	Manresa	58	(18)
2023–2025	Eastern	41	(38)
2025–	Lee Man	29	(15)
- * Club domestic league appearances and goals as of 20 November 2026

Noah Koffi Baffoe Donkor (born 21 May 1993) is a Spanish professional footballer who currently plays as a striker for Hong Kong Premier League club Lee Man.

== Club career ==
=== Eastern ===
On 28 August 2023, Baffoe signed for Hong Kong Premier League club Eastern. After joining Eastern, Baffoe scored in his first seven matches for Eastern. In November 2023, Baffoe was elected as the Hong Kong Premier League Player of the Month. In the same season, Baffoe became the first ever HKPL player to be named Player of the Month three months in a row (March to May 2024) and set a new record for most Player of the Month awards won in a single HKPL season (4). On 1 June 2024, Baffoe scored two goals in extra time for Eastern to win the 2023–24 Hong Kong FA Cup over Sham Shui Po, winning his first trophy with the club and confirmed Eastern's qualification for the 2024–25 AFC Champions League Two (ACL Two) group stage.

In the 2024–25 season, despite Eastern's elimination in the group stage of the competition, Baffoe scored three goals in six ACL Two games, including the game winning goal in Eastern's 2–1 triumph over Kaya–Iloilo on 25 October 2024, marking the first victory (and points) for any Hong Kong outfit in the ACL Two era.

=== Lee Man ===
On 12 July 2025, Baffoe joined Lee Man.

== Career statistics ==
=== Club ===
As of match on 31 May 2025

Appearances and goals by club, season and competition
Club	Season	League			National Cup		Other Cups		UEFA / AFC Competition		Total	
Club	Season	Division	Apps	Goals	Apps	Goals	Apps	Goals	Apps	Goals	Apps	Goals
Manresa	2020–21	Tercera División	25	9	0	0	0	0	0	0	25	9
Manresa	2021–22	Tercera Federación	32	11	0	0	0	0	0	0	32	11
Manresa	2022–23	Segunda Federación	35	9	1	0	0	0	0	0	36	9
Manresa	Total		92	29	1	0	0	0	0	0	93	29
Eastern Sports Club	2023–24	Hong Kong Premier League	17	17	3	4	12	9	0	0	32	30
Eastern Sports Club	2024–25	Hong Kong Premier League	24	21	3	7	8	4	6	3	41	35
Eastern Sports Club	Total		41	38	6	10	20	13	6	3	73	65
Career total			133	67	7	11	20	13	6	3	166	94

== Honour ==
=== Club ===
Eastern

- Hong Kong FA Cup: 2023–24, 2024–25
- Hong Kong Senior Shield: 2024–25

Lee Man

- Hong Kong League Cup: 2025–26

=== Individual ===
- Hong Kong Footballer of the Year: 2024–25
- Hong Kong Premier League Team of the Year: 2023–24, 2024–25
- Hong Kong Premier League Top goalscorer: 2023–24, 2024–25
