= Dudu (footballer, born 17 April 1990) =

Brazilian-born Hong Kong footballer (born 1990)

Dudu 杜度
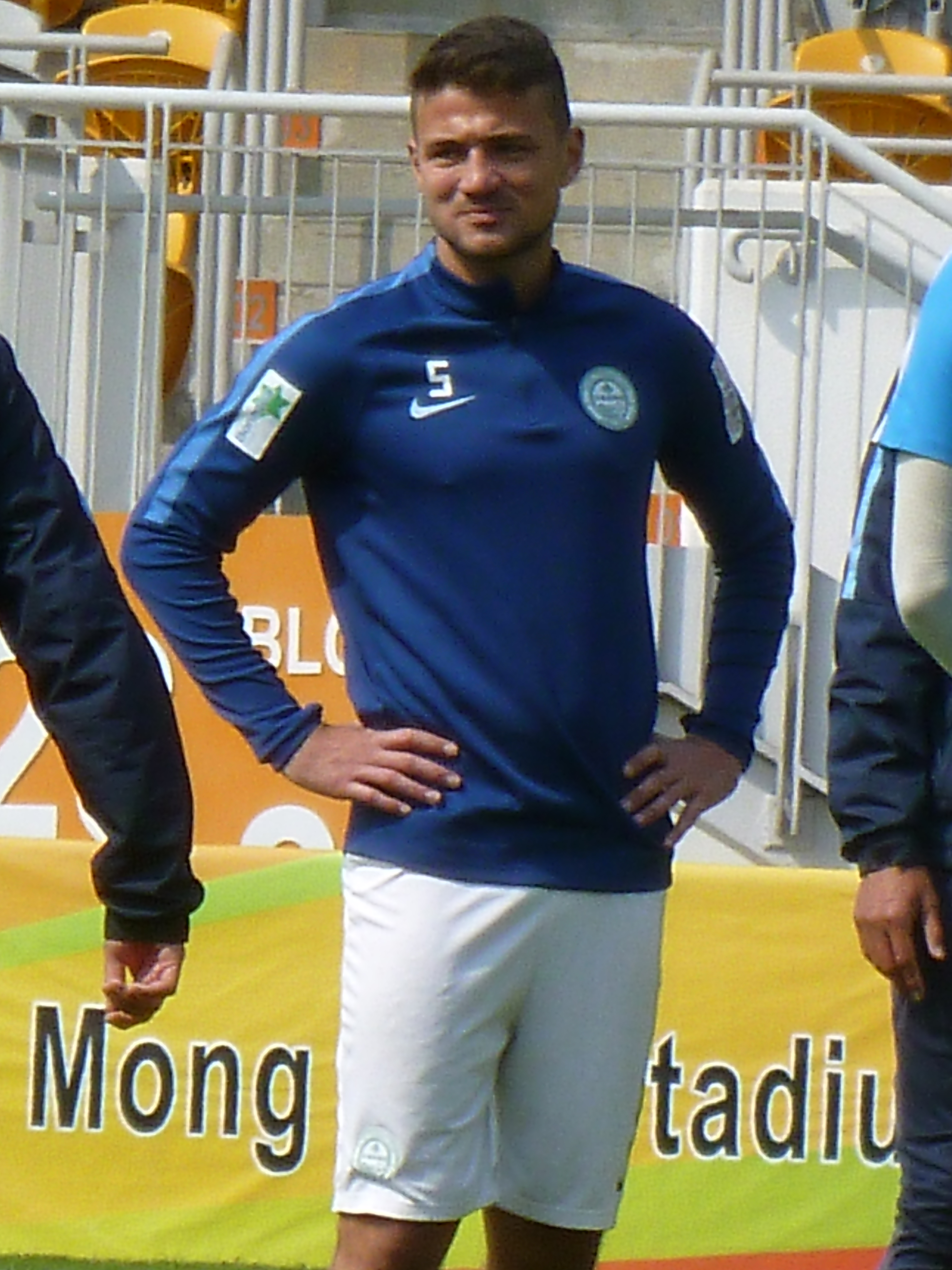

Personal information
- Full name: Luis Eduardo Chebel Klein Nunes
- Date of birth: 17 April 1990 (age 36)
- Place of birth: Ribeirão Preto, Brazil
- Height: 1.80 m (5 ft 11 in)
- Positions: Centre-back; defensive midfielder

Team information
- Current team: Kitchee
- Number: 20

Youth career
- 2007–2010: Santos

Senior career*
Years	Team	Apps	(Gls)
2010–2011	Santos	0	(0)
2011	→ Marcílio Dias (loan)	15	(1)
2012	Marcílio Dias	3	(0)
2013–2015	Resende	36	(4)
2015	Red Bull Brasil	2	(0)
2016	Penapolense	9	(0)
2016–2020	Tai Po	50	(13)
2020	R&F	5	(1)
2021	Eastern	10	(1)
2021–2023	Southern	12	(1)
2023–2026	Lee Man	37	(8)
2026–	Kitchee	5	(0)

International career^{‡}
2024–	Hong Kong	9	(2)
Medal record
Men's football
Representing Hong Kong
FIFA ASEAN Challenge Cup
Winner	2026 Hong Kong
- * Club domestic league appearances and goals as of 21 November 2026 ‡ National team caps and goals as of 3 October 2026

Luis Eduardo Chebel Klein Nunes (born 17 April 1990), commonly known as Dudu (Chinese: 杜度), is a professional footballer who currently plays as centre-back or defensive midfielder for Hong Kong Premier League club Kitchee. Born in Brazil, he plays for the Hong Kong national team.

== Club career ==
Dudu came through the youth system of Brazilian Série A giants Santos, where he once captained Neymar.

In 2013, he transferred to Resende. Dudu scored the winning header for Resende, in their 3–2 away win at national giants Flamengo.

In the summer of 2016, Dudu joined Hong Kong Premier League club Tai Po. In the 2018–19 season, he was part of the squad that won Tai Po's historical first-ever league title. In the 2019–20 season, he captained the club, becoming the first foreign captain in Tai Po's history.

On 1 June 2020, it was revealed that Dudu had agreed to sign with R&F. On 14 October 2020, Dudu left the club after the club withdrew from the HKPL at the start of the new season.

On 3 February 2021, it was revealed that Dudu had agreed to sign with Eastern.

On 4 July 2021, Dudu joined Southern.

On 20 June 2023, Dudu joined Lee Man.

On 11 July 2026, Dudu joined Kitchee.

== International career ==
On 14 February 2024, it was announced that Dudu had received his HKSAR passport after giving up his Brazilian passport, making him eligible to represent Hong Kong internationally.

On 29 February 2024, Dudu was named in the 30-man preliminary squad to play against Uzbekistan for the 2026 FIFA World Cup Qualifiers.

On 8 December 2024, Dudu made his international debut for Hong Kong in a 2025 EAFF E-1 Football Championship Preliminary Round match against Mongolia.

On 17 December 2024, Dudu scored his first international goal against Guam.

== Career statistics ==
=== International ===
As of 3 October 2026

National team	Year	Apps	Goals
Hong Kong	2024	2	1
Hong Kong	2025	4	0
Hong Kong	2026	3	1
Total		9	2

=== International goals ===
No.	Date	Venue	Opponent	Score	Result	Competition
1.	17 December 2024	Hong Kong Stadium, So Kon Po, Hong Kong	Guam	5–0	5–0	2025 EAFF E-1 Football Championship qualifying
2.	27 September 2026	Kai Tak Stadium, Kowloon, Hong Kong	Laos	3–0	4–0	2026 FIFA ASEAN Challenge Cup

== Honours ==
=== Club ===
Tai Po

- Hong Kong Premier League: 2018–19

Southern

- Hong Kong Sapling Cup: 2022–23

Lee Man

- Hong Kong Premier League: 2023–24
- Hong Kong League Cup: 2025–26

Hong Kong

- FIFA ASEAN Challenge Cup: 2026
