= Poon Pui Hin =

Hong Kong footballer (born 2000)

Poon Pui Hin 潘沛軒
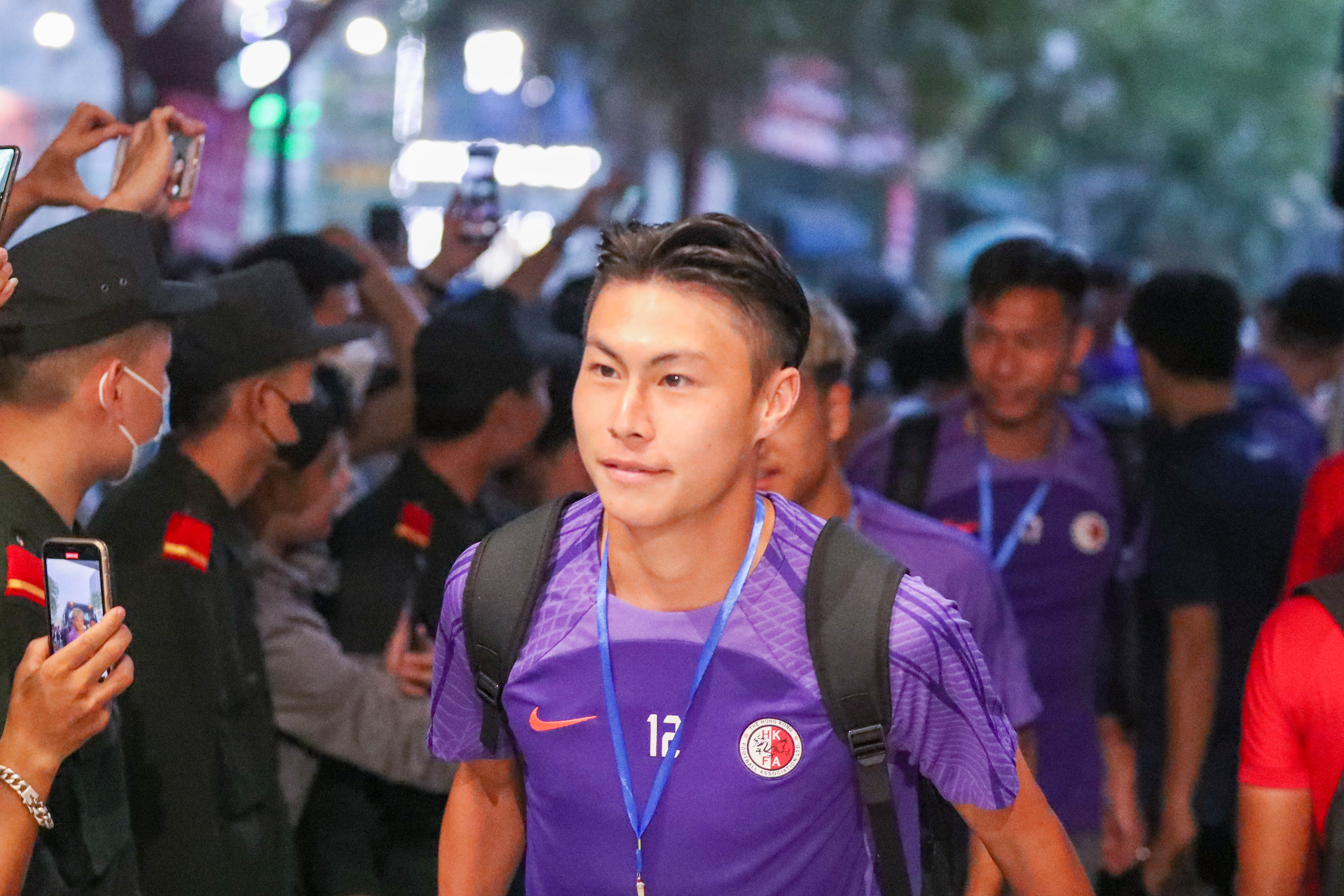
- Poon before the friendly match for Hong Kong vs Vietnam

Personal information
- Full name: Max Poon Pui Hin
- Date of birth: 3 October 2000 (age 26)
- Place of birth: Hong Kong
- Height: 1.80 m (5 ft 11 in)
- Position: Right winger

Team information
- Current team: Southern
- Number: 9

Youth career
- Rangers (HKG)

Senior career*
Years	Team	Apps	(Gls)
2016–2017	Biu Chun Glory Sky	1	(0)
2017–2018	South China	13	(4)
2018–2021	Happy Valley	33	(2)
2021–2025	Kitchee	45	(9)
2025–2026	Lee Man	18	(2)
2026–	Southern	7	(3)

International career^{‡}
2021	Hong Kong U23	1	(0)
2023–2024	Hong Kong	17	(3)
Medal record
Men's football
Representing Hong Kong
FIFA ASEAN Challenge Cup
Winner	2026 Hong Kong
- * Club domestic league appearances and goals as of 21 November 2026 ‡ National team caps and goals as of 27 September 2026

Max Poon Pui Hin (Chinese: 潘沛軒; born 3 October 2000) is a Hong Kong professional footballer who currently plays as a right winger for Hong Kong Premier League club Southern.

== Club career ==
On 6 May 2017, Poon made his HKPL debut for Biu Chun Glory Sky in the match against Tai Po at the age of 16.

On 11 August 2021, Poon signed for Kitchee. He was a core member in the Sapling Cup during the 2021–22 season, while he only made 1 league appearance during his first season at the club. He established himself as a first-team regular in the 2022–23 season, scoring 5 goals in 14 HKPL appearances.

On 7 July 2025, Poon joined Lee Man.

On 21 June 2026, Poon joined Southern.

== International career ==
On 23 March 2023, Poon made his international debut for Hong Kong in a friendly match against Singapore.

Poon scored his first two international goals in the friendly match against Brunei on 11 September 2023, helping Hong Kong to a 10–0 victory.

Poon was selected to represent Hong Kong in the 2022 Asian Games. On 1 October 2023, he scored the only goal in the quarter-final match against Iran, helping Hong Kong to advance to their first semi-final appearance in the competition.

On 26 December 2023, Poon was named in Hong Kong's squad for the 2023 AFC Asian Cup. On 1 January, the team played a friendly match behind closed doors against China, beating that team for the first time in 29 years. Poon came off the bench and was initially credited with two goals in a 2–1 comeback win, though his first was later recorded as an own goal by an opponent. Manager Jørn Andersen praised him as the "joker card" of the team.

== Personal life ==
Poon's father, Poon Man Chun, is a former professional footballer.

== Career statistics ==
=== Club ===
As of 23 December 2023

Club	Season	League			National Cup		League Cup		Continental		Other		Total	
Club	Season	Division	Apps	Goals	Apps	Goals	Apps	Goals	Apps	Goals	Apps	Goals	Apps	Goals
Biu Chun Glory Sky	2016–17	Hong Kong Premier League	1	0	0	0	0	0	0	0	0	0	1	0
South China	2017–18	Hong Kong First Division	13	4	0	0	–		–		0	0	13	4
Happy Valley	2018–19	Hong Kong First Division	9	2	0	0	–		–		0	0	9	2
Happy Valley	2019–20	Hong Kong Premier League	8	0	1 (Note: Appearances in the FA Cup)	0	7 (Note: Appearances in the Sapling Cup)	0	–		1 (Note: Appearances in the Senior Shield)	0	17	0
Happy Valley	2020–21	Hong Kong Premier League	16	0	0	0	7	0	–		0	0	23	0
Kitchee	2021–22	Hong Kong Premier League	1	0	1	0	8	0	0	0	0	0	10	0
Kitchee	2022–23	Hong Kong Premier League	14	5	3	2	4	0	1 (Note: Appearances in the AFC Champions League)	0	4	0	26	7
Kitchee	2023–24	Hong Kong Premier League	7	1	0	0	0	0	2	0	2	1	11	2
Career total			69	12	5	2	26	0	3	0	7	1	110	15

=== International ===
As of 27 September 2026

National team	Year	Apps	Goals
Hong Kong	2023	6	2
Hong Kong	2024	10	1
Hong Kong	2025	0	0
Hong Kong	2026	1	0
Total		17	3

==== International goals ====
No.	Date	Venue	Opponent	Score	Result	Competition
1.	11 September 2023	Hong Kong Stadium, So Kon Po, Hong Kong	Brunei	9–0	10–0	Friendly
2.	11 September 2023	Hong Kong Stadium, So Kon Po, Hong Kong	Brunei	10–0	10–0	Friendly
3.	1 January 2024	Baniyas Stadium, Abu Dhabi, United Arab Emirates	China	2–1	2–1	Friendly

Scores and results list Hong Kong's goal tally first, score column indicates score after each Poon goal.

== Honours ==
Kitchee

- Hong Kong Premier League: 2022–23
- Hong Kong Senior Shield: 2022–23, 2023–24
- Hong Kong FA Cup: 2022–23

Lee Man

- Hong Kong League Cup: 2025–26

Hong Kong

- FIFA ASEAN Challenge Cup: 2026
