= Gabriel Pierini =

Brazilian footballer (born 2000)

Personal information
- Full name: Gabriel Henrique Pierini
- Date of birth: 4 May 2000 (age 26)
- Place of birth: Fernandópolis, Brazil
- Height: 1.75 m (5 ft 9 in)
- Position: Midfielder

Youth career
- 2014–2015: Cruzeiro
- 2015–2016: Atlético Mineiro
- 2016–2017: América Mineiro
- 2017–2018: Luverdense
- 2018–2019: Cuiabá
- 2019: → Flamengo (loan)

Senior career*
Years	Team	Apps	(Gls)
2017–2018	Luverdense	0	(0)
2018–2023	Cuiabá	24	(0)
2021	→ Brasil de Pelotas (loan)	9	(0)
2022	→ Volta Redonda (loan)	6	(0)
2022	→ Confiança (loan)	4	(0)
2023	→ Iporá (loan)	13	(0)
2023	Cáceres	2	(1)
2023	Jataiense	14	(0)
2024	Goianésia	5	(0)
2024	Centro Oeste	12	(0)
2024–2025	Tai Po	9	(0)
- * Club domestic league appearances and goals as of 28 March 2025

Gabriel Henrique Pierini (born 4 May 2000) is a Brazilian professional footballer.

== Club career ==
Born in Fernandópolis, São Paulo, but raised in Várzea Grande, Mato Grosso, Pierini played for Cruzeiro, Atlético Mineiro, América Mineiro, Luverdense, Cuiabá and Flamengo as a youth. He made his senior debut in the 2017 Copa FMF with Luverdense, and first started to appear with Cuiabá in the same competition the following year, as the latter used an under-20 squad in the entire tournament.

Pierini was promoted to Cuiabá's first team squad for the 2020 campaign, and played his first match on 29 January 2020, in a 1–0 Campeonato Mato-Grossense away win against former club Luverdense. After being only a backup option, he made his Série B debut on 24 November, coming on as a first-half substitute for injured Lucas Hernández in a 0–2 away loss against Confiança, but also left the match due to an injury late on.

On 11 December 2020, Pierini renewed his contract until 2023.

On 15 August 2024, Pierini joined Hong Kong Premier League club Tai Po.

== Career statistics ==
=== Club ===
As of 4 May 2023

Club	Season	League			State League		Cup		Continental		Other		Total	
Club	Season	Division	Apps	Goals	Apps	Goals	Apps	Goals	Apps	Goals	Apps	Goals	Apps	Goals
Luverdense	2017	Série B	0	0	0	0	0	0	—		3 (Note: Appearance(s) in Copa FMF)	0	3	0
Cuiabá	2018	Série C	0	0	0	0	0	0	—		6	0	6	0
Cuiabá	2019	Série B	0	0	0	0	0	0	—		7	0	7	0
Cuiabá	2020	Série B	13	0	1	0	3	0	—		2 (Note: Appearance(s) in Copa Verde)	0	19	0
Cuiabá	2021	Série A	0	0	10	0	0	0	—		4 (Note: Three appearances in Copa FMF, one appearance in Copa Verde)	0	14	0
Cuiabá	Total		13	0	11	0	3	0	0	0	19	0	46	0
Brasil de Pelotas (loan)	2021	Série B	9	0	—		—		—		—		9	0
Volta Redonda (loan)	2022	Série C	0	0	6	0	0	0	—		—		6	0
Confiança (loan)	2022	Série C	4	0	—		—		—		—		4	0
Iporá (loan)	2023	Série D	0	0	13	0	—		—		—		13	0
Career total			26	0	28	0	3	0	0	0	22	0	79	0
