= Callum Beattie (footballer) =

Hong Kong footballer (born 2001)

Callum Beattie 比堤
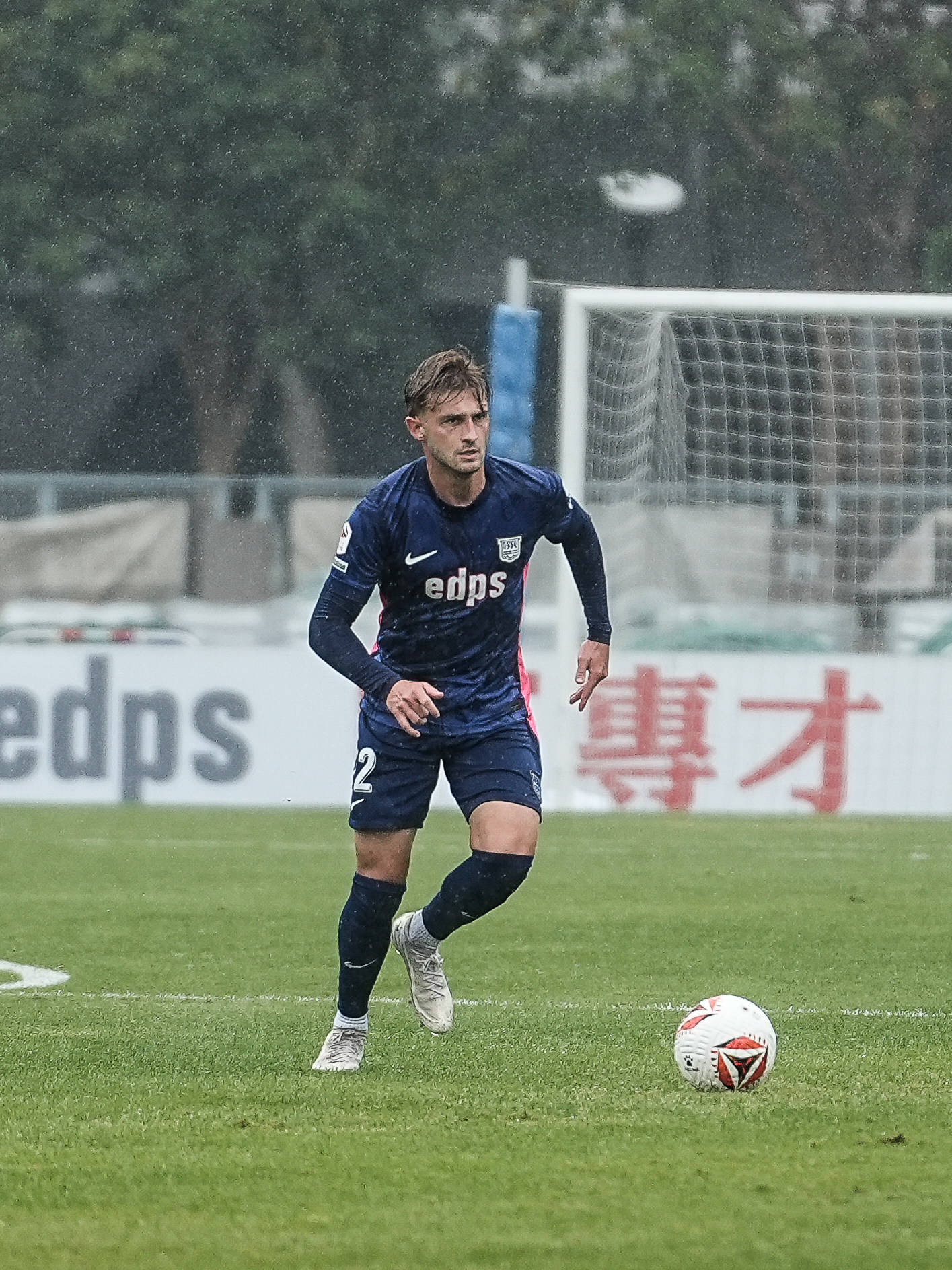

Personal information
- Full name: Callum Thomas Beattie
- Date of birth: 28 August 2001 (age 25)
- Place of birth: UK
- Height: 1.78 m (5 ft 10 in)
- Position: Left back

Team information
- Current team: Kitchee
- Number: 22

Youth career
- –2021: HKFC

College career
Years	Team	Apps	(Gls)
2019–2021	St. Bonaventure Bonnies	38	(0)
2022–2023	Simon Fraser Red Leafs	30	(0)

Senior career*
Years	Team	Apps	(Gls)
2018–2021	HKFC	39	(2)
2024–2025	HKFC	21	(3)
2025–	Kitchee	24	(0)

International career^{‡}
2026–	Hong Kong	3	(0)
Medal record
Men's football
Representing Hong Kong
FIFA ASEAN Challenge Cup
Winner	2026 Hong Kong
- * Club domestic league appearances and goals as of 19 October 2026 ‡ National team caps and goals as of 3 October 2026

Callum Thomas Beattie (born 28 August 2001) is a Hong Kong professional footballer who currently plays as a left back for Hong Kong Premier League club Kitchee and the Hong Kong national team.

== Early career ==
Born in United Kingdom, Beattie joined the academy of HKFC at the age of eight. He attended South Island School, and was the captain of the school football team. In 2019, Beattie won the All Hong Kong Schools Jing Ying Football Tournament with South Island School, and he was chosen as the Best Defender of the tournament after a 2–1 win in the final against Island School in the Mong Kok Stadium.

Beattie spent three years playing college soccer for St. Bonaventure Bonnies at the St. Bonaventure University between 2019 and 2021, while majoring in sports studies. He moved on to Simon Fraser University in 2022, playing two seasons for the Simon Fraser Red Leafs.

== Club career ==
Beattie first played for the HKFC first team in 2018, appearing in the semi-professional Hong Kong First Division. He made a couple of league appearances for HKFC during his time studying abroad.

Beattie returned to HKFC ahead of the 2024–25 season. On 22 September 2024, Beattie made his professional debut in a Hong Kong Premier League match against Lee Man, where he came off the bench in a 3–1 defeat. On 5 January 2025, he scored his first professional goal in a 2–0 win against Tai Po.

On 7 July 2025, Beattie was revealed as one of the four new Kitchee signings for the 2025–26 season.

== Personal life ==
Beattle's father was a semi-professional footballer in England.

Beattie is eligible for a HKSAR passport, which allows him to represent the Hong Kong national football team. As of February 2025, the application for a Hong Kong passport was in progress.

== International career ==
On 26 August 2025, it was announced that Beattie had received his HKSAR passport, making him eligible to represent Hong Kong internationally.

On 31 October 2025, Beattie was named in the 34-man preliminary squad for the November fixtures in a friendly against Cambodia and the AFC Asian Cup qualifiers against Singapore.

On 27 September 2026, Beattie made his international debut for Hong Kong in the 2026 FIFA ASEAN Cup match against Laos.

== Career statistics ==
=== College ===
School	Season	Division	Apps	Goals
St. Bonaventure Bonnies	2019	Div. I	14	0
St. Bonaventure Bonnies	2020–21	Div. I	9	0
St. Bonaventure Bonnies	2021	Div. I	15	0
St. Bonaventure Bonnies	Total		38	0
Simon Fraser Red Leafs	2022	Div. II	13	0
Simon Fraser Red Leafs	2023	Div. II	17	0
Simon Fraser Red Leafs	Total		30	0
Career total			68	0

=== Club ===
As of 19 March 2025

Club	Season	League			National Cup		League Cup		Other		Total	
Club	Season	Division	Apps	Goals	Apps	Goals	Apps	Goals	Apps	Goals	Apps	Goals
HKFC	2017–18	Hong Kong First Division	13	1	0	0	0	0	0	0	13	1
HKFC	2018–19	Hong Kong First Division	24	1	0	0	0	0	0	0	24	1
HKFC	2019–20	Hong Kong First Division	1	0	0	0	0	0	0	0	1	0
HKFC	2020–21	Hong Kong First Division	1	0	0	0	0	0	0	0	1	0
HKFC	2024–25	Hong Kong Premier League	15	2	1	0	3 (Note: Appearances in the Hong Kong Sapling Cup)	0	1 (Note: Appearances in the Hong Kong Senior Challenge Shield)	0	20	2
Career total			54	4	1	0	3	0	1	0	59	4

=== International ===
As of 3 October 2026

National team	Year	Apps	Goals
Hong Kong	2026	3	0
Total		3	0

== Honours ==
Kitchee

- Hong Kong Premier League: 2025–26

Hong Kong

- FIFA ASEAN Challenge Cup: 2026
