= North District Sports Ground =

Stadium in Sheung Shui, Hong Kong

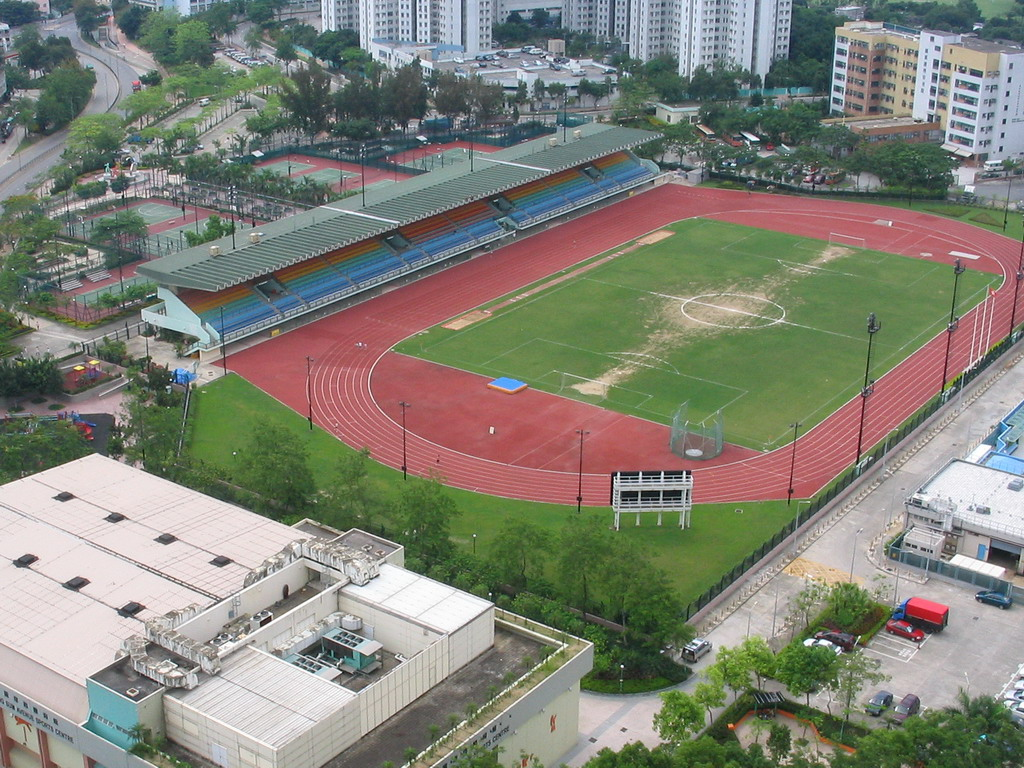
- Interactive map of North District Sports Ground
- Location: 26 Tin Ping Road, Sheung Shui, Hong Kong
- Coordinates: 22.5063813°N 114.130655°E
- Owner: Leisure and Cultural Services Department
- Operator: Leisure and Cultural Services Department
- Capacity: 2,500
- Surface: Grass
- Pitch size: 100 x 62 meters (110 x 68 yards)
- Public transit: Sheung Shui station

Construction
- Opened: 8 January 1994; 32 years ago

Tenant
- North District

North District Sports Ground (Chinese: 北區運動場) is a multi-purpose sports ground located at 26 Tin Ping Road, Sheung Shui, New Territories, Hong Kong. It is managed by the Leisure and Cultural Services Department of Hong Kong Government.

== Facilities ==
- Fully covered grandstand
- Natural grass football field
- 400 meters running track (Only 336 meters for jogging)
