= Maurício Cortés =

Colombian footballer (born 1997)

Personal information
- Full name: Maurício Cortés Armero
- Date of birth: 9 February 1997 (age 29)
- Place of birth: Medellín, Colombia
- Height: 1.73 m (5 ft 8 in)
- Position: Striker

Team information
- Current team: PT Satun

Youth career
- Deportivo Cali
- Alianza Deportiva
- La Mazzia
- Selección Valle

Senior career*
Years	Team	Apps	(Gls)
2016–2021	Independiente Medellín	30	(6)
2017	→ La Equidad (loan)	10	(0)
2018	→ Karpaty Lviv (loan)	3	(0)
2018–2019	→ Jaguares de Córdoba (loan)	22	(4)
2021	Deportes Quindío	18	(0)
2022	Always Ready	0	(0)
2022	Cúcuta Deportivo	5	(0)
2023	Comerciantes	22	(2)
2024	Tainan City	18	(13)
2025	Al Hamriyah	1	(0)
2025	Comerciantes	1	(0)
2026	Rangers (HKG)	14	(2)
2026–	PT Satun	0	(0)
- * Club domestic league appearances and goals as of 16 May 2026

Maurício Cortés Armero (born 9 February 1997) is a Colombian professional footballer who plays as a striker for Thai League 2 club PT Satun.

== Club career ==
Born in Medellín, Cortés is a product of the football clubs Deportivo Cali, Alianza Deportiva, Club La Mazzia and Selección Valle. After that, he had a trial with a Spanish Córdoba CF, but returned to his native Colombia and signed a contract with Independiente Medellín.

In January 2018, Cortés moved to Ukraine, signing a deal with Ukrainian Premier League side FC Karpaty Lviv.

On 12 January 2026, Cortés joined Hong Kong Premier League club Rangers.

== Honours ==
Independiente Medellín

- Categoría Primera A: 2016–I
- Copa Colombia: 2019
