= Kayron =

Brazilian footballer

Personal information
- Full name: Kayron Batista Ramos
- Date of birth: 3 April 1995 (age 31)
- Place of birth: Kaloré, Brazil
- Height: 1.85 m (6 ft 1 in)
- Position: Forward

Team information
- Current team: Southern
- Number: 27

Youth career
- 2013–2014: Pelotas
- 2014–2015: Juventude

Senior career*
Years	Team	Apps	(Gls)
2014	Pelotas	0	(0)
2014–2017	Juventude	2	(0)
2016	→ Concórdia (loan)	0	(0)
2017	→ Veranópolis (loan)	0	(0)
2017	→ Mirassol (loan)	0	(0)
2018	Cruzeiro-RJ	0	(0)
2018	Barra	0	(0)
2018	Ararat-Armenia	14	(1)
2019	Hercílio Luz	8	(1)
2019–2020	Avenida		
2020	Novo Hamburgo		
2020	Barra		
2021	Novo Hamburgo		
2021	Internacional		
2022	CRAC		
2022	Portuguesa	6	(0)
2022	Boa Esporte		
2022	Anapolina		
2023	CRAC	13	(3)
2023–2024	Tai Po	2	(1)
2024–2026	Kowloon City	44	(22)
2026–	Southern	5	(3)
- * Club domestic league appearances and goals as of 7 November 2026

Kayron Batista Ramos (born 3 April 1995), commonly known as Kayron, is a Brazilian professional footballer who currently plays as a forward for Hong Kong Premier League club Southern.

== Club career ==
On 1 September 2023, Kayron joined Tai Po.

On 18 July 2024, Kayron joined Kowloon City.

On 10 July 2026, Kayron joined Southern.

== Career statistics ==
=== Club ===
As of 5 July 2019

Club	Season	League			State League		Cup		Continental		Other		Total	
Club	Season	Division	Apps	Goals	Apps	Goals	Apps	Goals	Apps	Goals	Apps	Goals	Apps	Goals
Pelotas	2014	—			1 (Note: Appearances in the Campeonato Gaúcho)	0	0	0	–		0	0	1	0
Juventude	2014	Série C	2	0	0	0	0	0	–		0	0	2	0
Juventude	2015	Série C	0	0	0	0	0	0	–		0	0	0	0
Juventude	2016	Série C	0	0	7	0	2 (Note: Appearances in the Copa do Brasil)	0	–		0	0	9	0
Juventude	Total		2	0	7	0	2	0	0	0	0	0	11	0
Concórdia (loan)	2016	—			12 (Note: Appearances in the Campeonato Catarinense II)	5	0	0	–		0	0	12	5
Veranópolis (loan)	2017	—			10	2	0	0	–		0	0	10	2
Mirassol (loan)	2017	—			0	0	0	0	–		10 (Note: Appearances in the Copa Paulista)	0	10	0
Cruzeiro-RS	2018	—			8	3	0	0	–		0	0	8	3
Barra-SC	2018	—			3	1	0	0	–		0	0	3	1
Ararat-Armenia	2018–19	Armenian Premier League	14	1	–		4 (Note: Appearances in the Armenian Cup)	2	–		0	0	18	3
Hercílio Luz	2019	Série D	8	1	10 (Note: Appearances in the Campeonato Catarinense)	2	0	0	–		0	0	18	3
Career total			24	2	51	13	6	2	0	0	10	0	91	17
