= Yu Okubo =

Japanese footballer

Personal information
- Full name: Yu Okubo
- Date of birth: 17 May 1997 (age 29)
- Place of birth: Kyoto, Japan
- Height: 1.76 m (5 ft 9 in)
- Position: Forward

Team information
- Current team: Eastern
- Number: 9

Youth career
- –2019: Kansai University

Senior career*
Years	Team	Apps	(Gls)
2020–2023	Gainare Tottori	71	(13)
2024	Hills United	29	(13)
2025	NWS Spirit	27	(18)
2025–	Eastern	29	(25)
- * Club domestic league appearances and goals as of 22 November 2026

Yu Okubo (大久保 優, Okubo Yu; born 17 May 1997) is a Japanese professional footballer currently plays as a forward for Hong Kong Premier League club Eastern.

== Club career ==
On 1 September 2025, Okubo joined Hong Kong Premier League club Eastern.

== Career statistics ==
=== Club ===
As of 1 September 2025

Club	Season	League			National Cup		Total	
Club	Season	Division	Apps	Goals	Apps	Goals	Apps	Goals
Gainare Tottori	2020	J3 League	26	6	0	0	26	6
Gainare Tottori	2021	J3 League	18	0	2	2	20	2
Gainare Tottori	2022	J3 League	11	5	1	0	12	5
Gainare Tottori	2023	J3 League	16	2	1	0	17	2
Hills United	2024	NPL NSW	29	13	1	2	30	15
NWS Spirit	2025	NPL NSW	27	18	2	3	29	21
Career total			127	44	7	7	134	51

Notes

Hills United and NWS Spirit FC stats are sourced from Dribl

== Honour ==
=== Individual ===
- Hong Kong Premier League Top goalscorer: 2025–26
