= Lau Chi Lok =

Hong Kong footballer (born 1993)

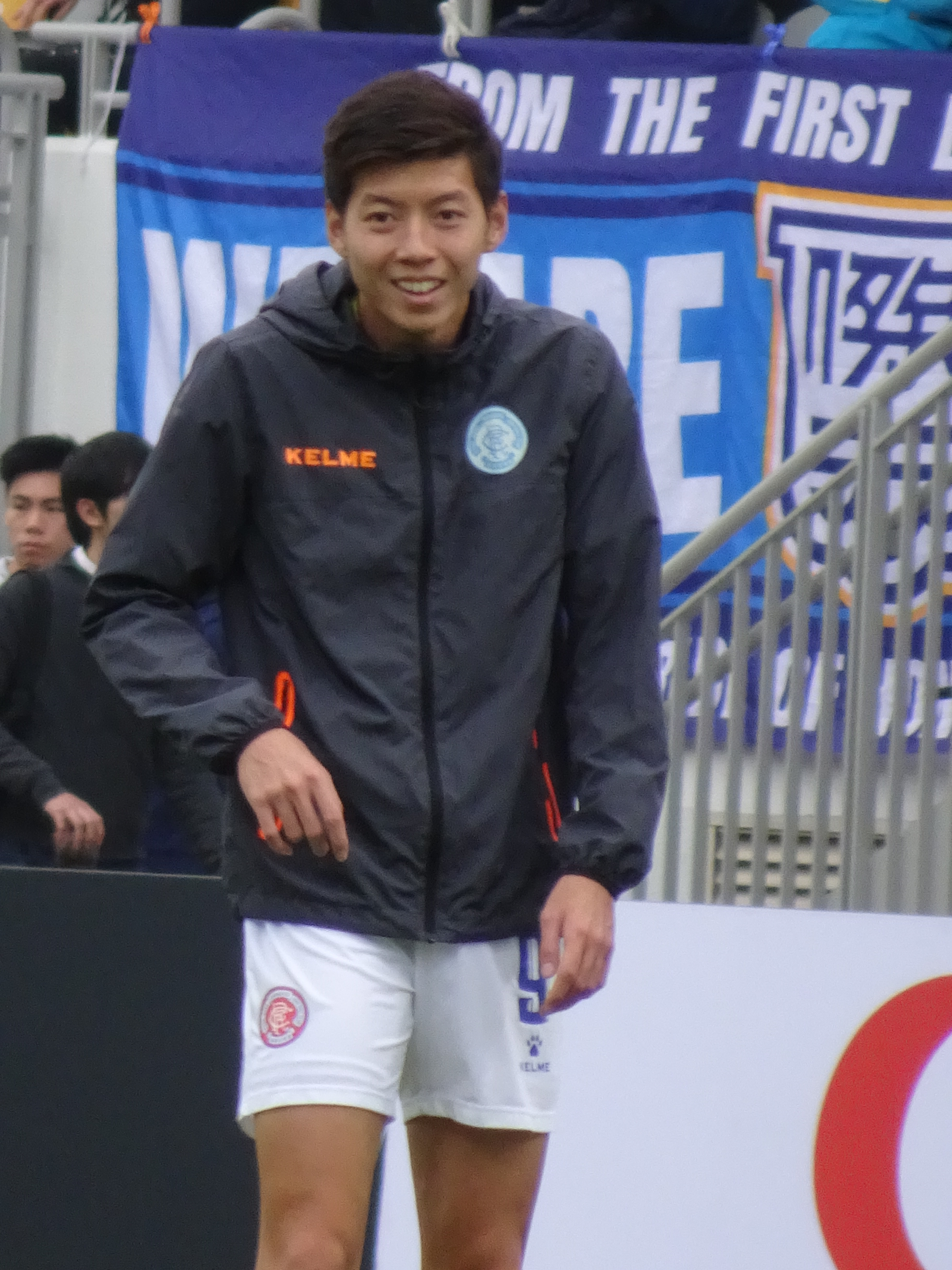
- Lau with Rangers in 2018

Personal information
- Full name: Lau Chi Lok
- Date of birth: 15 October 1993 (age 33)
- Place of birth: British Hong Kong
- Height: 1.80 m (5 ft 11 in)
- Position: Forward

Team information
- Current team: Rangers (HKG)
- Number: 7

Youth career
- 2009–2010: Pegasus

Senior career*
Years	Team	Apps	(Gls)
2010–2012	Pegasus	0	(0)
2010–2012	→ Yuen Long (loan)	19	(1)
2012–2013	Southern	0	(0)
2013–2014	Kwai Tsing	18	(5)
2014–2015	Wing Yee	20	(17)
2015–2016	Wong Tai Sin	2	(0)
2016–2017	Biu Chun Glory Sky	16	(0)
2017–2018	Rangers (HKG)	12	(0)
2018–2020	Pegasus	5	(0)
2019–2020	→ Rangers (HKG) (loan)	8	(0)
2020–	Rangers (HKG)	115	(23)
- * Club domestic league appearances and goals as of 21 November 2026

Lau Chi Lok (Chinese: 劉智樂; born 15 October 1993) is a Hong Kong professional footballer who currently plays as a forward for Hong Kong Premier League club Rangers.

== Club career ==
On 9 August 2017, Lau joined Rangers.

On 23 July 2018, Lau joined Pegasus.

On 1 August 2019, Lau was loaned to Rangers for the 2019–20 season. He officially joined the club at the end of the season.

== Honours ==
=== Club ===
Rangers

- Hong Kong Sapling Cup: 2023–24
