= Léo (footballer, born 1992) =

Brazilian-born Hong Kong footballer

Personal information
- Full name: Leonardo José Peres
- Date of birth: 7 April 1992 (age 34)
- Place of birth: Passo Fundo, Brazil
- Height: 1.87 m (6 ft 2 in)
- Position: Forward

Team information
- Current team: Eastern District
- Number: 17

Senior career*
Years	Team	Apps	(Gls)
2011	Pedrabranca		
2012–2015	Gaúcho		
2017	Esportivo	6	(0)
2018	South China	2	(1)
2018–2021	Eastern District	43	(29)
2020	→ Wong Tai Sin (loan)	0	(0)
2021–2025	HKFC	44	(11)
2025–	Eastern District	19	(2)
- * Club domestic league appearances and goals as of 11 October 2026

Leonardo José Peres (born 7 April 1992), commonly known as Léo, is a professional footballer who currently plays as a forward for Hong Kong Premier League club Eastern District. Born in Brazil, he acquired his HKSAR passport in December 2025.

== Club career ==
In September 2021, Léo joined Hong Kong Premier League club HKFC.

On 23 July 2025, Léo joined Eastern District.

== International career ==
On 6 December 2025, Léo officially announced that he had received a HKSAR passport after giving up his Brazilian passport, making him eligible to represent Hong Kong internationally.
