= 2025–26 Kitchee SC season =

Kitchee
- President: Ken Ng
- Head Coach: Inigo Calderon
- Stadium: Mong Kok Stadium; Tseung Kwan O Sports Ground
- Premier League: 1st
- FA Cup: Quarter-finals
- League Cup: Semi-finals
- Senior Shield: Quarter-finals
- Top goalscorer: League: Adrián Revilla (5); All: Adrián Revilla (7)
Home colours	Away colours

The 2025–26 season is Kitchee's 44th season in the top-tier division in Hong Kong football. Kitchee has competed in the Premier League, Senior Challenge Shield, FA Cup, Sapling Cup this season.

== Squad ==
=== First team ===
As of 10 June 2025

Squad No.	Name	Nationality	Date of birth (age)	Previous club	Contract since	Contract end
Goalkeepers
1	Wang Zhenpeng	(Hong Kong) (China)	5 May 1984 (age 42)	(China) Dalian Shide (C1)	2005	2025
13	Ainikaer Maihemuti ^{FP}	(China)	3 January 2002 (age 24)	(China) Xinjiang Tianshan Leopard (C2)	2023	2025
Defenders
2	Law Tsz Chun	(Hong Kong)	2 March 1997 (age 29)	Youth Team	2008	2025
3	Roger Riera ^{FP}	(Spain)	17 February 1995 (age 31)	(Spain) Atlético Sanluqueño (S3)	2025	2026
4	Matheus Dantas ^{FP}	(Brazil)	5 September 1998 (age 27)	(Czech Republic) 1. SC Znojmo FK (C2)	2024	2025
6	Jay Haddow	(Hong Kong) (Japan) (England) (Scotland)	2 April 2004 (age 22)	(England) Blackburn Rovers (E2)	2024	2027
22	Callum Beattie	(Hong Kong) (England)	28 August 2001 (age 24)	(Hong Kong) HKFC	2025	2026
27	Jordan Lam	(Hong Kong)	2 February 1999 (age 27)	(Hong Kong) North District	2024	2025
Midfielders
5	Asier Illarramendi	(Spain)	8 March 1990 (age 36)	(United States) FC Dallas	2025	2026
8	Cheng Chin Lung	(Hong Kong)	7 January 1998 (age 28)	Youth Team	2008	2025
10	Kendy Ikegami ^{FP}	(Brazil)	6 January 1999 (age 27)	(Hong Kong) North District FC	2025	2026
11	Yumemi Kanda ^{FP}	(Japan)	14 September 1994 (age 31)	(North Macedonia) KF Besa Dobërdoll	2025	2026
16	Tan Chun Lok	(Hong Kong)	15 January 1996 (age 30)	(China) R&F (Hong Kong)	2023	2025
33	Thurain Tun	(Myanmar)	22 August 2005 (age 20)	(Portugal) Louletano U19	2026	2026
Strikers
7	Ruslan Mingazow ^{FP}	(Turkmenistan)	23 November 1991 (age 34)	(Kazakhstan) FC Caspiy (K1)	2022	2025
9	Adrián Revilla ^{FP}	(Spain)	30 September 1997 (age 28)	(Spain) Barakaldo CF (S3)	2025	2026
12	Wong Ho Chun	(Hong Kong)	2 April 2002 (age 24)	(China) Qingdao Hainiu	2026	2026
15	Martín Merquelanz	(Spain)	12 June 1995 (age 31)	FC Andorra	2026	2026
20	Leandro Martínez ^{FP}	(Spain)	7 July 1994 (age 32)	(Spain) Sestao River Club	2025	2026
21	Seb Buddle	(Hong Kong) (England)	27 July 1999 (age 27)	(Hong Kong) Southern	2016	2025
30	Juninho	(Hong Kong) (Brazil)	11 December 1990 (age 35)	Hong Kong Rangers	2023	2025
Players who left during mid-season
29	Kim Shin-wook ^{FP}	(South Korea)	14 April 1988 (age 38)	(Singapore) Lion City Sailors (S1)	2023	2025
Players who left on loan
18	Chen Ngo Hin	(Hong Kong)	27 February 2003 (age 23)	(Hong Kong) Southern	2023	2025

Remarks:
^{FP} These players are registered as foreign players.

=== U22 team ===
As of 28 August 2024

Squad No.	Name	Nationality	Date of birth (age)	Previous club	Contract since	Contract end
Goalkeepers
17	Pong Cheuk Hei	(Hong Kong)	31 January 2004 (age 22)	(Hong Kong) North District	2025	2026
23	Tuscany Shek	(Hong Kong)	25 December 2007 (age 18)	Youth Team	2023	2025
Defenders
34	Jason Kam Chi Kin	(Hong Kong)	6 March 2004 (age 22)	Youth Team	2022	2025
41	Lam Pak Yin	(Hong Kong)	4 October 2008 (age 17)	Youth Team	2024	2026
54	Chan Yin Hei	(Hong Kong)	4 May 2007 (age 19)	Youth Team	2023	2024
63	Lai Wing Ki	(Hong Kong)	29 January 2007 (age 19)	(Hong Kong) Shatin Shapei Youth	2024	2024
	Chan Pak Yin	(Hong Kong)	30 April 2007 (age 19)	Youth Team	2024	2024
	Sin Wai Kiu	(Hong Kong)	18 March 2008 (age 18)	(Hong Kong) Wan Chai Youth	2024	2024
Midfielders
32	Yuen Chun Him	(Hong Kong)	7 January 2006 (age 20)	Youth Team	2022	2026
35	Marco Pirie	(Hong Kong) (England)	12 January 2005 (age 21)	Youth Team	2024	2024
37	Chan Shing Chun	(Hong Kong)	5 February 2007 (age 19)	(Hong Kong) Rangers Youth	2023	2026
39	Chen Tao ^{FP}	(China)	1 November 2007 (age 18)	Youth Team	2024	2025
40	Li Siu Hin	(Hong Kong)	4 January 2008 (age 18)	Youth Team	2023	2026
47	Yu Ching Wai	(Hong Kong)	25 September 2007 (age 18)	Youth Team	2023	2026
50	Pang Hin Lun	(Hong Kong) (Australia)	25 May 2009 (age 17)	Youth Team	2023	2026
53	Chan Ming Yiu	(Hong Kong)	31 January 2007 (age 19)	Youth Team	2024	2024
57	Ng Tsz Long Jan	(Hong Kong)	10 February 2007 (age 19)	(Hong Kong) Rangers Youth	2023	2024
68	Lo Chun Hei	(Hong Kong)	13 May 2008 (age 18)	Youth Team	2023	2024
Strikers
31	Matthew Slattery	(Hong Kong) (England)	5 April 2005 (age 21)	Youth Team	2021	2026
33	Yeung Cheuk Kwan	(Hong Kong)	1 December 2006 (age 19)	Youth Team	2023	2025
42	Cheung Yin Hin	(Hong Kong)	18 June 2008 (age 18)	Youth Team	2024	2026
56	Cheung Ka Man	(Hong Kong)	6 September 2007 (age 18)	(Hong Kong) Kowloon City Youth	2024	2024
60	Yiu Tsz Leong	(Hong Kong)	26 September 2008 (age 17)	(Hong Kong) Lee Man Youth	2024	2026
66	Ernest Tse Yin Tao	(Hong Kong)	6 June 2007 (age 19)	(Hong Kong) Rangers Youth	2023	2024
69	Enzo Levaire	(Japan)	6 March 2009 (age 17)	(Hong Kong) Rangers Youth	2025	2026
72	Lam Tsun Wing	(Hong Kong)	31 March 2009 (age 17)	Youth Team	2025	2026
Players who left mid-season

=== Women team ===
As of 28 August 2024

Squad No.	Name	Nationality	Date of birth (age)	Previous club	Contract since	Contract end
Goalkeepers
1	Leung Wai Nga	(Hong Kong)	24 August 1988 (age 37)		2023	
55	Wong Hiu Yau Hazel	(Hong Kong)	31 August 2010 (age 15)		2025	
72	Chan Tsz Yiu	(Hong Kong)	6 June 2010 (age 16)		2025	
Defenders
4	Claire Chu Shing Yin	(Hong Kong)	1 November 1988 (age 37)	(England) Wigan Athletic	2024	
9	Chung Pui Ki	(Hong Kong)	2 February 1988 (age 38)	(England) Wigan Athletic	2023	
13	Chu So Kwan	(Hong Kong)	3 March 2004 (age 22)		2023	
14	Danielle Vos	(Netherlands) (Norway)	23 January 2001 (age 25)	(United States) Kennesaw State University	2023	
30	Chan Ka Wun	(Hong Kong)	1 January 1990 (age 36)		2023	
65	Lee Hong To	(Hong Kong)			2025	
Midfielders
3	Chan Hoi Ching	(Hong Kong)	13 June 2006 (age 20)	(England) Wigan Athletic	2023	
8	Fu Chiu Man	(Hong Kong)	2 June 1998 (age 28)	(Hong Kong) HKFC	2023	
10	Cham Ching Man	(Hong Kong)	1 May 1996 (age 30)	(Japan) FC Zebra Ladies (J2)	2024	
16	Lau Yui Ching	(Hong Kong)	15 August 1994 (age 32)	(Hong Kong) Lung Moon	2023	
20	Ho Yuet Ning	(Hong Kong)	24 November 1999 (age 26)		2025	
21	Li Sun Wai Rachel	(Hong Kong)	21 December 2009 (age 16)		2025	
23	Ho Mui Mei	(Hong Kong)	15 March 1993 (age 33)	(Hong Kong) Citizen AA	2023	
25	Choi Wing Kei	(Hong Kong)	13 January 1998 (age 28)		2023	
27	So Hoi Lam	(Hong Kong)	2 November 1999 (age 26)	(Japan) FC Zebra Ladies (J2)	2024	
60	Fung Ting Yin	(Hong Kong)	16 September 2010 (age 15)		2025	
68	Tang Tsz Wan	(Hong Kong)	2 March 2010 (age 16)		2025	
Forwards
5	Chu Po Yan	(Hong Kong)	1 August 2005 (age 21)	(Hong Kong) Citizen AA	2024	
6	Wong Ka Sze	(Hong Kong)	30 October 2003 (age 22)	(Hong Kong) Tai Po	2023	
7	Kwong Wing Yan	(Hong Kong)	25 July 1984 (age 42)		2023	
17	Cheung Wai Ki	(Hong Kong)	22 November 1990 (age 35)	(Australia) Brisbane Roar Women	2021	
18	Au Tsz Cheuk Annabelle	(Hong Kong)	24 July 2006 (age 20)	(Hong Kong) Grace Citizen	2025	

== Transfers ==
=== Transfers in ===
Pre-Season

Position	Player	Transferred from	Ref
GK	(Hong Kong) Pong Cheuk Hei	(Hong Kong) North District FC	Free
DF	(Spain) Roger Riera	(Spain) Atlético Sanluqueño (S3)	Free
DF	(England) Callum Beattie	(Hong Kong) HKFC	Free
MF	(Japan) Yumemi Kanda	(North Macedonia) KF Besa Dobërdoll	Free
MF	(Brazil) Kendy Ikegami	(Hong Kong) North District FC	Free
MF	(Spain) Asier Illarramendi	Free Agent	N.A.
FW	(Spain) Adrián Revilla	(Spain) Barakaldo CF (S3)	Free
FW	(Spain) Leandro Martínez	(Spain) Sestao River Club	Free

Mid-season

Position	Player	Transferred To	Fee
FW	(Hong Kong) Wong Ho Chun	(China) Qingdao Hainiu	Free
FW	(Spain) Martín Merquelanz	FC Andorra	Free
MF	(Myanmar) Thurain Tun	(Portugal) Louletano U19	Free

=== Transfers out ===
Preseason

Position	Player	Transferred To	Fee
GK	(England) Fynn Talley	(England)	Free
DF	(Hong Kong) (Brazil) Fernando	(Hong Kong) Tai Po	Free
DF	(Hong Kong) (Brazil) Hélio	(Hong Kong) Eastern District SA	Free
DF	(Philippines) (Spain) Diego Bardanca	(Thailand) Kanchanaburi Power	Free
DF	(Hong Kong) (Scotland) Leon Jones	(Hong Kong) Eastern District SA	Free
DF	(South Korea) Bae Jae-woo	(South Korea)	Free
MF	(Hong Kong) Chen Ngo Hin	(Hong Kong) Southern	Season loan
MF	(Spain) Aarón Rey	(Switzerland) AC Bellinzona	Free
MF	(Hong Kong) Yim Kai Cheuk	(Hong Kong) Kowloon City District SA	Free
MF	(Hong Kong) Ngan Cheuk Pan	(Hong Kong) Tai Po	Free
MF	(Hong Kong) (Japan) Sohgo Ichikawa	(Hong Kong) Southern	Free
FW	(Hong Kong) Yeung Cheuk-kwan	(Hong Kong) Eastern District SA	Free
FW	(Hong Kong) Poon Pui Hin	(Hong Kong) Lee Man FC	Free
FW	(Portugal) Luís Machado	(Cyprus) Ethnikos	Free
FW	(Brazil) Welthon	(Portugal)	Free
FW	(Uzbekistan) Sherzod Temirov	(Iraq) Erbil SC	Free

Mid-season

Position	Player	Transferred To	Fee
FW	(South Korea) Kim Shin-wook	(South Korea)	Termination

== Club officials ==
=== Club senior staff ===
Position	Name
President	(Hong Kong) Ken Ng
General Manager	(Australia) (Hong Kong) Wilson Ng
Technical Director	(Hong Kong) (Spain) Jordi Tarrés
Licensing and Public Relations Manager	(Canada) (Hong Kong) Ng Yee Yun
Director of Marketing	(Hong Kong) Lo Shuk Ting
Director of Football	(Hong Kong) Chu Chi Kwong
Director of Youth Training Development	(Hong Kong) Chu Chi Kwong
Technical Director of Football Academy	
Competition Manager	(Hong Kong) Chiu Yun Shing
Customer Service Manager	(Hong Kong) Cheng Ching Yu

=== Coaching staff ===
Position	Name
Head coach	(Spain) Iñigo Calderón
Assistant head coach	(Hong Kong) Poon Man Chun (Hong Kong) (Spain) Fernando Recio
First-Team assistant coach	(Hong Kong) (China) Huang Yang (Hong Kong) (Brazil) Roberto
Goalkeeping coach	(Hong Kong) Guo Jianqiao
Head Physical Coach & Head of Data Analysis	
Strength & Conditioning Coach	(Hong Kong) Kobe Kou
Tactical Analyst	(Hong Kong) Dani Cancela
Team Assistant	(Hong Kong)
Men U22 Team coach	
Men U18 Youth Team coach	
Men U16 Youth Team coach	(Hong Kong) Gao Wen
Men U14 Youth Team coach	
Women Team Head coach	(Hong Kong) Cheung Po Chun
Women U18 Youth Team coach	(Hong Kong) Cheung Po Chun
Women U15 Youth Team coach	(Hong Kong) Cheung Wai Ki
Kitchee Academy Director	(Hong Kong) Chu Chi Kwong
Kitchee Academy coach	(Hong Kong) Gao Wen
Kitchee Director of Elite Youth	(Portugal) Edgar Cardoso
Professional Footballer Preparatory Programme coach	(Hong Kong) Chu Chi Kwong
Club Consultant Doctor	(Hong Kong) Dr. Yung Shu Hang
Club Consultant Dietitian	(Hong Kong) Sylvia Lam

== Friendlies ==
Win Draw Loss

=== Pre-season friendly ===
Tour of Thailand (27 July - 3 Aug)

28 July 2025 1	Chiangrai United F.C. (Thailand)	1–1	(Hong Kong) Kitchee SC	Chiangrai
	Itsuki Enomoto 11' (pen.)		Juninho 52'	Stadium: Singha Chiangrai Stadium

31 July 2025 2	Lion City Sailors (Singapore)	–	(Hong Kong) Kitchee SC	Bangkok

2 Aug 2025 3	Kesetsart F.C. (Thailand)	2–1	(Hong Kong) Kitchee SC	Bangkok
			Juninho 49'	Stadium: Insee Chantarasatit Stadium

7 February 2026 1	Kitchee (Hong Kong)	1–3	(China) Shandong Taishan	Tseung Kwan O, New Territories
			Zeca; Raphaël Merkies	Stadium: Tseung Kwan O Sports Ground

== Team statistics ==
=== Appearances and goals ===
As of 15 Feb 2026

No.	Pos.	Player	Premier League		FA Cup		League Cup		Challenge Shield		Total	
No.	Pos.	Player	Apps	Goals	Apps	Goals	Apps	Goals	Apps	Goals	Apps	Goals
1	GK	(Hong Kong) (China) Wang Zhenpeng	7	0	0	0	0	0	1	0	8	0
2	DF	(Hong Kong) Law Tsz Chun	3+4	0	0	0	1	0	0+1	0	9	0
3	DF	(Spain) Roger Riera	12	0	0	0	1	0	1	0	14	0
4	DF	(Brazil) Matheus Dantas	11	1	0	0	0	0	1	0	12	1
5	MF	(Spain) Asier Illarramendi	8+1	1	0	0	0	0	0	0	9	1
6	DF	(Hong Kong) (Japan) (England) (Scotland) Jay Haddow	5+5	0	0	0	0	0	1	0	10	0
7	FW	(Turkmenistan) Ruslan Mingazow	6+5	2	0	0	0	0	0	0	11	2
8	MF	(Hong Kong) Cheng Chin Lung	5+7	1	0	0	1	0	0+1	0	14	1
9	FW	(Spain) Adrián Revilla	13+1	7	0	0	1	0	1	2	16	9
10	MF	(Brazil) (Japan) Kendy Ikegami	10+2	3	0	0	1	1	1	0	14	4
11	MF	(Japan) Yumemi Kanda	10+2	7	0	0	1	1	1	0	14	8
12	FW	(Hong Kong) Wong Ho Chun	0+3	1	0	0	0	0	0	0	3	1
13	GK	(China) Ainikaer Maihemuti	0	0	0	0	1	0	0	0	1	0
15	FW	(Spain) Martín Merquelanz	0	0	0	0	0	0	0	0	0	0
16	MF	(Hong Kong) Tan Chun Lok	12+1	0	0	0	0	0	1	0	14	0
17	GK	(Hong Kong) Pong Cheuk Hei	7	0	0	0	0	0	0	0	7	0
20	FW	(Spain) Leandro Martínez	9+4	3	0	0	1	0	1	0	15	3
21	FW	(Hong Kong) (England) Seb Buddle	0+1	0	0	0	0	0	0	0	1	0
22	DF	(Hong Kong) (England) Callum Beattie	12+1	0	0	0	0+1	0	1	0	15	0
27	DF	(Hong Kong) Jordan Lam	4+9	2	0	0	1	0	0+1	0	15	2
29	FW	(South Korea) Kim Shin-wook	0+1	0	0	0	0+1	1	0	0	2	1
30	FW	(Hong Kong) (Brazil) Juninho	9+5	4	0	0	0	0	1	0	15	4
31	FW	(Hong Kong) Matthew Slattery	0+1	0	0	0	0+1	0	0	0	2	0
34	MF	(Hong Kong) Jason Kam Chin Kin	7+4	1	0	0	1	0	0	0	12	1
37	MF	(Hong Kong) Chan Shing Chun	0+3	0	0	0	0	0	0	0	3	0
40	FW	(Hong Kong) Li Siu Hin	0+2	0	0	0	0+1	0	0	0	3	0
41	FW	(Hong Kong) Lam Pak Yin	3+1	0	0	0	1	0	0	0	5	0
42	FW	(Hong Kong) Cheung Yiu Hin	0+1	0	0	0	0	0	0	0	1	0

== Competitions ==
=== Hong Kong Premier League ===
Win Draw Loss

29 August 2025 1	Eastern	0–1	Kitchee	Mong Kok, Kowloon
18:00		Report	Cheng Chin Lung 35'; Matheus Dantas (yellow card) 61'; Juninho (yellow card) 90+1'	Stadium: Mong Kok Stadium; Attendance: 2,706; Referee: Liu Kwok Man

14 September 2025 2	Eastern District	0–1	Kitchee	Siu Sai Wan, Chai Wan
18:00	Yiu-Cho Joe Chan (yellow card) 39'; Yoong Ka Hei (yellow card) 73'; Paulo César (yellow card) 87'	Report	Leandro Martínez 87' (pen.); Tan Chun Lok (red card) 25'; Roger Riera Canadell (yellow card) 75'; Matheus Dantas (yellow card) 81'	Stadium: Siu Sai Wan Sports Ground; Referee: Wong Wai-lun

20 September 2025 3	Lee Man	2–3	Kitchee	Mong Kok, Kowloon
18:00	Willian Gaúcho 83'; Law Tsz Chun 86' (o.g.); Merab Gigauri (yellow card) 54'; Lau Ka Kiu (yellow card) 90+4'	Report	Kendy 41'; Yumemi Kanda 44'; Adrián Revilla 74'; Roger Riera (yellow card) 37'; Jay Haddow (yellow card) 48'; Law Tsz Chun (yellow card) 90'	Stadium: Mong Kok Stadium; Attendance: 1,626

18 October 2025 4	Tai Po	1–1	Kitchee	Tsing Yi, New Territories
18:00	Michel Renner 63'; Law Chun Ting (red card) 73'	Report	Adrián Revilla 67'; Leandro Martínez (yellow card) 31'; Callum Thomas Beattie (yellow card) 61'; Kendy Renato Ikegami Leira (yellow card) 72'	Stadium: Tsing Yi Sports Ground; Attendance: 1,270; Referee: Yu Kin-fung

26 October 2025 5	Kitchee	3–3	North District	Mong Kok, Kowloon
18:00	Wong Chun Hong 20' (o.g.); Jordan Lam 69' (yellow card) 90+4'; Ruslan Mingazov 69'; Matheus Dantas (yellow card) 86'	Report	Samuel Salustiano 23'; Elian David Villalobos 66'; Jahangir Khan 88' (yellow card) 19'; Chung Hoi Man (yellow card) 76'	Stadium: Mong Kok Stadium

2 November 2025 6	Kowloon City	0–5	Kitchee	Siu Sai Wan, Chai Wan
18:00	Lam Chin Yi (yellow card) 31'; Diego Eli (yellow card) 62'; Kang Jun-hyeon (yellow card) 68'	Report	Adrián Revilla 25'; Juninho 45+1', 52', 56'; Yumemi Kanda 47'; Roger Riera (yellow card) 41'; Tan Chun Lok (yellow card) 58'	Stadium: Siu Sai Wan Sports Ground; Attendance: 685; Referee: Tang Hing-fu

26 November 2025 7 (Rescheduled)	Southern	2–4	Kitchee	Aberdeen, Hong Kong Island
18:00	Stefan Pereira 14' (pen.); Song Ju-ho 60'; Kota Kowase (yellow card) 37'; Shin Ilsoo (yellow card) 45'	Report	Kendy Renato Ikegami Leira 29', 35'; Ruslan Mingazov 43'; Leandro Martínez 45+1' (pen.); Juninho (yellow card) 24'; Law Tsz Chun (yellow card) 90+4'	Stadium: Aberdeen Sports Ground; Referee: Tam Ping-wun

2 December 2025 8 (Rescheduled)	Kitchee	1–0	Eastern District	Mong Kok, Kowloon
18:00	Yumemi Kanda 45+3' (yellow card) 22'; Cheng Chin Lung (yellow card) 35'; Matheus Dantas (yellow card) 68'	Report	Leon Jones (yellow card) 28'; Helio (yellow card) 56'; Ahmed Waseem Razeek (yellow card) 62'	Stadium: Mong Kok Stadium; Attendance: 2,374; Referee: Yu Kin-fung

13 December 2025 9	North District	1–2	Kitchee	Sheung Shui, New Territories
18:00	Samuel Granada 80'; Wong Chun-Ho (yellow card) 85'	Report	Leandro Martínez 59'; Adrián Revilla 65'; Tan Chun Lok (yellow card) 38'	Stadium: North District Sports Ground; Attendance: 950; Referee: Luk Kin-sun

11 January 2026 10	HKFC	1–2	Kitchee	Happy Valley, Hong Kong Island
18:00	Enzo Dietrich 45+3'; Hugo Filipe (yellow card) 77'	Report	Adrián Revilla 5'; Yumemi Kanda 45+1'; Jay Haddow (yellow card) 2'	Stadium: Hong Kong Football Club Stadium; Attendance: 1,160; Referee: Ho Wai-sing

25 January 2026 11	Kitchee	4–2	Tai Po	Tsing Yi, New Territories
18:00	Yumemi Kanda 11', 42'; Juninho 27'; Adrián Revilla 45'; Roger Riera (yellow card) 66'	Report	Paulinho 67' (yellow card) 45+6'; Michel Renner 87'; Weverton Rangel (yellow card) 24'; Gerson Vieira (yellow card) 70'	Stadium: Tsing Yi Sports Ground; Attendance: 1,424; Referee: Tam Ping Wun

17 January 2026 12	Eastern District	0–3	Kitchee	Mong Kok, Kowloon
18:00	Ansah Maxwell (yellow card) 52'; Yakubu (yellow card) 90+3'	Report	Asier Illarramendi 33'; Adrián Revilla 84'; Anson Wong 87'	Stadium: Mong Kok Stadium; Attendance: 529; Referee: CHEUNG Wai-lung, Mario

31 January 2026 13	Kitchee	3–0	KC Southern	Tseung Kwan O, New Territories
18:00	Jordan Kam 24'; Matheus Dantas 73'; Jordan Lam 75'		Shin Il-soo (yellow card) 58'	Stadium: Tseung Kwan O Sports Ground; Attendance: 639; Referee: Lau Fong-hei

15 February 2026 14	Kitchee	1–0	Lee Man	Tseung Kwan O, New Territories
18:00	Yumemi Kanda 55'; Pong Cheuk Hei (yellow card) 89'	Report	Mikael Severo (yellow card) 88'	Stadium: Tseung Kwan O Sports Ground; Attendance: 2,159; Referee: Tam Ping-wun

1 March 2026 15	Kitchee	5–2	HKFC	Tseung Kwan O, New Territories
18:00				Stadium: Tseung Kwan O Sports Ground

14 March 2026 16	Kitchee	–	Kowloon City	Tseung Kwan O, New Territories
18:00				Stadium: Tseung Kwan O Sports Ground

21 March 2026 17	Kitchee	–	Eastern	Tseung Kwan O, New Territories
18:00				Stadium: Tseung Kwan O Sports Ground

12 April 2026 18	Kitchee	–	BC Rangers	Tseung Kwan O, New Territories
18:00				Stadium: Tseung Kwan O Sports Ground

Pos	Team	Pld	W	D	L	GF	GA	GD	Pts	Qualification or relegation (Note: Teams play each other twice (18 matches), before the league is split into two groups (the top five and the bottom five).)
1	Kitchee (C)	22	16	4	2	54	28	+26	52	Qualification for AFC Champions League Two group stage
2	Tai Po	22	13	4	5	49	32	+17	43	Qualification for AFC Champions League Two group stage (Note: Tai Po qualified for the AFC Champions League Two group stage as the 2025–26 Hong Kong FA Cup winners.)
3	Lee Man	22	12	6	4	57	26	+31	42	
4	Eastern	22	9	5	8	39	37	+2	32 (Note: Head-to-head points: Eastern 6, North District 3)	
5	North District	22	8	8	6	43	39	+4	32	
6	Kowloon City	22	8	4	10	28	39	−11	28	
7	Southern	22	7	4	11	28	35	−7	25	
8	Eastern District	22	5	6	11	20	22	−2	21 (Note: Head-to-head points: Eastern District 7, Rangers 1)	
9	Rangers	22	6	3	13	26	44	−18	21	
10	HKFC	22	3	2	17	18	60	−42	11	

Source: Hong Kong Football Association
Rules for classification: 1) Points; 2) Head-to-head points; 3) Head-to-head goal difference; 4) Head-to-head goals scored; 5) Goal difference; 6) Goals scored; 7) Fair-play points; 8) Drawing lots (Play-off if the winner has to be decided).
(C) Champions

=== Hong Kong FA Cup ===
7 March 2026 Quarter-final	Tai Po	1–1 (6–5 p)	Kitchee	Mong Kok Stadium
18:30	Fernando 10'	Report	Revilla 33'	Attendance: 1,948; Referee: Luk Kin Sun
	Penalties
	Paulinho (penalty scored); Lee Ka Ho (penalty scored); Renner (penalty missed); Chung Wai Keung (penalty scored); Marcão (penalty scored); Law Chun Ting (penalty scored); Mikael (penalty scored)		Kendy (penalty scored); Dantas (penalty scored); Revilla (penalty scored); Beattie (penalty scored); Haddow (penalty missed); Mingazow (penalty scored); Wong Ho Chun (penalty missed)

=== Hong Kong League Cup ===
11 October 2025 Quarter-final	Kitchee	3–0	BC Rangers	Tai Po, New Territories
15:00	Yumemi Kanda 47'; Kendy Ikegami 76'; Kim Shin-wook 90+2'; Jason Kam (yellow card) 58'; Lam Pak Yin (yellow card) 68'	Report	Ching-Wan George Cheung (yellow card) 62'; Chen Tao (yellow card) 90+4'	Stadium: Tai Po Sports Ground; Attendance: 1,035; Referee: Poon Chun-kit

11 March 2026 Semi-final	Kitchee	–	Kowloon City	Mong Kok Stadium
		Report

=== Hong Kong Senior Challenge Shield ===
28 September 2025 Quarter-final	Kitchee	2–3	North District	Tsing Yi, New Territories
18:30	Adrián Revilla 45', 45+4' (pen.); Tan Chun Lok (yellow card) 52'; Roger Riera (yellow card) 85'	Report	Vinicius Soares 40'; Weverton 80' (pen.) (yellow card) 89'; Samuel Granada 82'; Carlos Andrés Páez (yellow card) 11'; Kayke David (yellow card) 12'; Wong Ho Yin (yellow card) 47'; Elian Villalobos (yellow card) 71'; Law Hiu Chung (yellow card) 90'; Wong Wai Kwok (yellow card) 90+5'	Stadium: Tsing Yi Sports Ground; Attendance: 451
