= 2024–25 Kitchee SC season =

Kitchee
- President: Ken Ng
- Head Coach: Edgar Cardoso
- Stadium: Mong Kok Stadium
- Premier League: 4th
- Senior Shield: Semi-final
- FA Cup: Quarter-final
- Sapling Cup: Group stage
- Top goalscorer: League: Sherzod Temirov (12); All: Sherzod Temirov (15)
Home colours	Away colours

The 2024–25 season is Kitchee's 43rd season in the top-tier division in Hong Kong football. Kitchee has competed in the Premier League, Senior Challenge Shield, FA Cup, Sapling Cup this season.

== Squad ==
=== First team ===
As of 10 June 2024

Squad No.	Name	Nationality	Date of birth (age)	Previous club	Contract since	Contract end
Goalkeepers
1	Wang Zhenpeng	(Hong Kong) (China)	5 May 1984 (age 42)	(China) Dalian Shide (C1)	2005	2025
13	Ainikaer Maihemuti ^{FP}	(China)	3 January 2002 (age 24)	(China) Xinjiang Tianshan Leopard (C2)	2023	2025
25	Fynn Talley ^{FP}	(England)	14 September 2002 (age 23)	(England) Peterborough United (E3)	2024	2025
Defenders
2	Law Tsz Chun	(Hong Kong)	2 March 1997 (age 29)	Youth Team	2008	2025
3	Leon Jones	(Hong Kong) (Scotland)	28 February 1998 (age 28)	(Hong Kong) Eastern	2024	2025
4	Matheus Dantas ^{FP}	(Brazil)	5 September 1998 (age 27)	(Czech Republic) 1. SC Znojmo FK (C2)	2024	2025
5	Hélio	(Hong Kong) (Brazil)	31 January 1986 (age 40)	(Hong Kong) Citizen	2014	2025
6	Jay Haddow ^{FP}	(Hong Kong) (Japan) (England) (Scotland)	2 April 2004 (age 22)	(England) Blackburn Rovers (E2)	2024	2025
11	Jordan Lam	(Hong Kong)	2 February 1999 (age 27)	(Hong Kong) North District	2024	2025
12	Bae Jae-woo ^{FP}	(South Korea)	17 May 1993 (age 33)	(South Korea) Gimpo FC (K2)	2024	2025
17	Fernando	(Hong Kong) (Brazil)	14 November 1986 (age 39)	(Hong Kong) Eastern	2022	2025
22	Diego Bardanca ^{FP}	(Philippines) (Spain)	20 March 1993 (age 33)	(Indonesia) Persis Solo (I1)	2024	2025
Midfielders
8	Cheng Chin Lung	(Hong Kong)	7 January 1998 (age 28)	Youth Team	2008	2025
16	Tan Chun Lok	(Hong Kong)	15 January 1996 (age 30)	(China) R&F (Hong Kong)	2023	2025
18	Chen Ngo Hin	(Hong Kong)	27 February 2003 (age 23)	(Hong Kong) Southern	2023	2025
20	Aarón Rey ^{FP}	(Spain)	19 May 1998 (age 28)	(Spain) Cultural Leonesa (S3)	2024	2025
24	Ngan Cheuk Pan	(Hong Kong)	22 January 1998 (age 28)	(Hong Kong) Sham Shui Po	2023	2025
Strikers
7	Ruslan Mingazow ^{FP}	(Turkmenistan)	23 November 1991 (age 34)	(Kazakhstan) FC Caspiy (K1)	2022	2025
9	Welthon ^{FP}	(Brazil)	21 June 1992 (age 34)	(Portugal) S.C.U. Torreense (P2)	2024	2025
10	Luís Machado ^{FP}	(Portugal)	4 November 1992 (age 33)	(Poland) Radomiak Radom (P1)	2024	2025
14	Poon Pui Hin	(Hong Kong)	3 October 2000 (age 25)	(Hong Kong) Happy Valley	2021	2025
21	Seb Buddle	(Hong Kong) (England)	27 July 1999 (age 26)	(Hong Kong) Southern	2016	2025
27	Sherzod Temirov ^{FP}	(Uzbekistan)	27 October 1998 (age 27)	(Iran) Paykan (I2)	2023	2025
29	Kim Shin-wook ^{FP}	(South Korea)	14 April 1988 (age 38)	(Singapore) Lion City Sailors (S1)	2023	2025
30	Juninho	(Hong Kong) (Brazil)	11 December 1990 (age 35)	Hong Kong Rangers	2023	2025
39	Chen Tao ^{FP}	(China)	1 November 2007 (age 18)	Youth Team	2024	2025
Players who left during mid-season
Players who left on loan

Remarks:
^{FP} These players are registered as foreign players.

=== U22 team ===
As of 28 August 2024

Squad No.	Name	Nationality	Date of birth (age)	Previous club	Contract since	Contract end
Goalkeepers
23	Tuscany Shek	(Hong Kong)	25 December 2007 (age 18)	Youth Team	2023	2025
Defenders
34	Jason Kam Chi Kin	(Hong Kong)	6 March 2004 (age 22)	Youth Team	2022	2025
54	Chan Yin-Hei	(Hong Kong)	4 May 2007 (age 19)	Youth Team	2023	2024
63	Lai Wing-Ki	(Hong Kong)	29 January 2007 (age 19)	(Hong Kong) Shatin Shapei Youth	2024	2024
	Chan Pak-Yin	(Hong Kong)	30 April 2007 (age 19)	Youth Team	2024	2024
	Sin Wai-Kiu	(Hong Kong)	18 March 2008 (age 18)	(Hong Kong) Wan Chai Youth	2024	2024
Midfielders
26	Sohgo Ichikawa	(Hong Kong) (Japan)	30 July 2004 (age 21)	(Hong Kong) Southern	2023	2025
32	Yuen Chun Him	(Hong Kong)	7 January 2006 (age 20)	Youth Team	2022	2024
35	Marco Pirie	(Hong Kong) (England)	12 January 2005 (age 21)	Youth Team	2024	2024
39	Chen Tao	(China)	1 November 2007 (age 18)	Youth Team	2023	2024
50	Pang Hing Lun	(Hong Kong) (Australia)	25 May 2009 (age 17)	Youth Team	2023	2024
53	Chan Ming-Yiu	(Hong Kong)	31 January 2007 (age 19)	Youth Team	2024	2024
55	Yu Ching-Wai	(Hong Kong)	25 September 2007 (age 18)	Youth Team	2023	2024
57	Ng Tsz-Long Jan	(Hong Kong)	10 February 2007 (age 19)	(Hong Kong) Rangers Youth	2023	2024
67	Li Siu Hin	(Hong Kong)	4 January 2008 (age 18)	Youth Team	2023	2024
68	Lo Chun-Hei	(Hong Kong)	13 May 2008 (age 18)	Youth Team	2023	2024
69	Chan Shing-Chun	(Hong Kong)	5 February 2007 (age 19)	(Hong Kong) Rangers Youth	2023	2024
Strikers
31	Matthew Slattery	(Hong Kong) (England)	5 April 2005 (age 21)	Youth Team	2023	2025
33	Yeung Cheuk Kwan	(Hong Kong)	1 December 2006 (age 19)	Youth Team	2023	2025
51	Cheung Yiu Hin	(Hong Kong)	18 June 2008 (age 18)	Youth Team	2023	2024
56	Cheung Ka-Man	(Hong Kong)	6 September 2007 (age 18)	(Hong Kong) Kowloon City Youth	2024	2024
60	Yiu Tsz Leong	(Hong Kong)	26 September 2008 (age 17)	(Hong Kong) Lee Man Youth	2024	2024
66	Ernest Tse Yin-Tao	(Hong Kong)	6 June 2007 (age 19)	(Hong Kong) Rangers Youth	2023	2024
70	Lam Pak-yin	(Hong Kong)	4 October 2008 (age 17)	Youth Team	2024	2024
72	Pang Hing-Hei	(Hong Kong) (Australia)	6 March 2007 (age 19)	Youth Team	2023	2024
Players who left mid-season
38	Wesley Chan Yuen-Ho	(Hong Kong) (Australia)	20 June 2006 (age 20)	Youth Team	2023	2024

=== Women team ===
As of 28 August 2024

Squad No.	Name	Nationality	Date of birth (age)	Previous club	Contract since	Contract end
Goalkeepers
1	Leung Wai Nga	(Hong Kong)	24 August 1988 (age 37)		2023	
50	Li Sze Ying	(Hong Kong)	29 March 2007 (age 19)		2023	
Defenders
4	Claire Chu Shing Yin	(Hong Kong)	1 November 1988 (age 37)		2024	
9	Chung Pui Ki	(Hong Kong)	2 February 1988 (age 38)		2023	
13	Chu So Kwan	(Hong Kong)	3 March 2004 (age 22)		2023	
14	Danielle Vos	(Netherlands)	23 January 2001 (age 25)		2023	
30	Chan Ka Wun	(Hong Kong)	1 January 1990 (age 36)		2023	
Midfielders
3	Chan Hoi Ching	(Hong Kong)	13 June 2006 (age 20)		2023	
8	Fu Chiu Man	(Hong Kong)	2 June 1998 (age 28)		2023	
16	Lau Yui Ching	(Hong Kong)	15 August 1994 (age 31)		2023	
20	Wong Tsz Ying	(Hong Kong)	1 July 2003 (age 22)		2024	
21	Cheung Mei Ping	(Hong Kong)	8 July 1997 (age 28)		2023	
23	Ho Mui Mei	(Hong Kong)	15 March 1993 (age 33)		2023	
25	Choi Wing Kei	(Hong Kong)	13 January 1998 (age 28)		2023	
27	Ho Yuet Ning	(Hong Kong)	24 November 1999 (age 26)		2023	
Forwards
2	Lee Wing Yan	(Hong Kong)	28 April 1997 (age 29)		2023	
5	Chu Po Yan	(Hong Kong)	1 August 2005 (age 20)		2024	
6	Wong Ka Sze	(Hong Kong)	30 October 2003 (age 22)		2023	
7	Kwong Wing Yan	(Hong Kong)	25 July 1984 (age 41)		2023	
12	Mika Simons	(United States)	18 November 2000 (age 25)		2024	
17	Cheung Wai Ki	(Hong Kong)	22 November 1990 (age 35)		2023	
19	So Po Yu	(Hong Kong)	17 August 1996 (age 29)		2024	

== Transfers ==
=== Transfers in ===
Pre-Season

Position	Player	Transferred from	Ref
GK	(England) Fynn Talley	(England) Peterborough United	Free
DF	(Philippines) (Spain) Diego Bardanca	(Indonesia) Persis Solo	Free
DF	(Japan) (England) (Scotland) (Hong Kong) Jay Haddow	(England) Blackburn Rovers	Free
DF	(Hong Kong) (Scotland) Leon Jones	(Hong Kong) Eastern Sports Club	Free
DF	(Hong Kong) Jordan Lam	(Hong Kong) North District FC	Free
DF	(South Korea) Bae Jae-woo	(South Korea) Gimpo FC	Free
DF	(Brazil) Matheus Dantas	(Czech Republic) 1. SC Znojmo FK	Free
DF	(Hong Kong) Ngan Cheuk Pan	(Hong Kong) Sham Shui Po	Loan Return
DF	(Hong Kong) Chang Kwong Yin	(Hong Kong) Sham Shui Po	Loan Return
DF	(Hong Kong) Yim Kai Cheuk	(Hong Kong) HK U23	Loan Return
DF	(Hong Kong) (England) Jordon Brown	(Hong Kong) HKFC	Loan Return
MF	(Hong Kong) Chen Ngo Hin	(Hong Kong) Southern	Loan Return
MF	(Spain) Aarón Rey	(Spain) Cultural Leonesa	Free
FW	(Portugal) Luís Machado	(Poland) Radomiak Radom	Free
FW	(Brazil) Welthon	(Portugal) S.C.U. Torreense	Free

Post-Season

Position	Player	Transferred from	Ref
GK	(Hong Kong) Pong Cheuk Hei	(Hong Kong) North District FC	Free
DF	(Spain) Roger Riera	(Spain) Atlético Sanluqueño (S3)	Free
DF	(England) Callum Beattie	(Hong Kong) HKFC	Free
MF	(Japan) Yumemi Kanda	(North Macedonia) KF Besa Dobërdoll	Free
MF	(Brazil) Kendy Ikegami	(Hong Kong) North District FC	Free
FW	(Estonia) Henri Anier	(Hong Kong) Lee Man FC	Free
FW	(Spain) Adrián Revilla	(Spain) Barakaldo CF (S3)	Free

=== Transfers out ===
Preseason

Position	Player	Transferred To	Fee
GK	(Hong Kong) (Brazil) Paulo César	(Hong Kong) Central & Western	Free
DF	(England) Charlie Scott	(Indonesia) Semen Padang	Free
DF	(Hong Kong) (England) Andy Russell	Hong Kong FC	Free
DF	(Hong Kong) (England) Jordon Brown	(Hong Kong) Eastern District	Free
DF	(Hong Kong) (Brazil) Roberto	Retired	N.A.
DF	(Hong Kong) Chang Kwong Yin	Hong Kong Rangers FC	Free
MF	(Bosnia and Herzegovina) Sedin Ramic	(Bosnia and Herzegovina) FK Radnik Hadžići	Free
MF	(Hong Kong) (Brazil) Mikael	(United Arab Emirates) Emirates Club	Free
MF	(Hong Kong) (Brazil) Cleiton	Retired	Free
MF	(Hong Kong) (China) Huang Yang	Retired	N.A.
FW	(Austria) Jakob Jantscher	(Austria) ASK Voitsberg	Free
FW	(Hong Kong) (Japan) Shinichi Chan	(China) Shanghai Shenhua	Free
FW	(Brazil) Igor Sartori	(Hong Kong) Tai Po FC	Free

Mid-season

Position	Player	Transferred To	Ref
MF	(Hong Kong) (Australia) Wesley Chan Yuen-Ho	(Hong Kong)	Free

Postseason

Position	Player	Transferred To	Ref
GK	(England) Fynn Talley	(England)	Free
DF	(Hong Kong) (Brazil) Fernando	(Hong Kong) Tai Po	Free
DF	(Hong Kong) (Brazil) Hélio	(Hong Kong) Eastern District SA	Free
DF	(Philippines) (Spain) Diego Bardanca	(Indonesia)	Free
DF	(Hong Kong) (Scotland) Leon Jones	(China)	Free
DF	(South Korea) Bae Jae-woo	(South Korea)	Free
MF	(Spain) Aarón Rey	(Spain)	Free
MF	(Hong Kong) Yim Kai Cheuk	(Hong Kong) Kowloon City District SA	Free
MF	(Hong Kong) Ngan Cheuk Pan	(Hong Kong) Tai Po	Free
MF	(Hong Kong) (Japan) Sohgo Ichikawa	(Hong Kong) Southern	Free
FW	(Hong Kong) Yeung Cheuk-kwan	(Hong Kong)	Free
FW	(Hong Kong) Poon Pui Hin	(Hong Kong) Lee Man FC	Free
FW	(Portugal) Luís Machado	(Poland)	Free
FW	(Brazil) Welthon	(Portugal)	Free
FW	(Uzbekistan) Sherzod Temirov	(Uzbekistan)	Free

=== Loans out ===
Position	Player	Transferred To	Ref
DF	(Hong Kong) Yim Kai Cheuk	(Hong Kong) Kowloon City District SA	Season loan
MF	(Hong Kong) (Japan) Sohgo Ichikawa	(Hong Kong) Southern	Season loan

== Club officials ==
=== Club senior staff ===
Position	Name
President	(Hong Kong) Ken Ng
General Manager	(Australia) (Hong Kong) Wilson Ng
Technical Director	(Hong Kong) (Spain) Jordi Tarrés
Licensing and Public Relations Manager	(Canada) (Hong Kong) Ng Yee Yun
Director of Marketing	(Hong Kong) Lo Shuk Ting
Director of Football	(Hong Kong) Chu Chi Kwong
Director of Youth Training Development	(Hong Kong) Chu Chi Kwong
Technical Director of Football Academy	
Competition Manager	(Hong Kong) Chiu Yun Shing
Customer Service Manager	(Hong Kong) Cheng Ching Yu

=== Coaching staff ===
Position	Name
Head coach	(Portugal) Edgar Cardoso
Assistant head coach	(Portugal) Stefano Sousa (Hong Kong) (Spain) Fernando Recio
First-Team assistant coach	(Hong Kong) (China) Huang Yang (Hong Kong) (Brazil) Roberto
Goalkeeping coach	(Hong Kong) Guo Jianqiao
Head Physical Coach & Head of Data Analysis	
Strength & Conditioning Coach	(Hong Kong) Wesley Wong
Tactical Analyst	(Hong Kong) Aaron Sek
Team Assistant	(Hong Kong)
Men U22 Team coach	
Men U18 Youth Team coach	(Hong Kong) Poon Man Chun
Men U16 Youth Team coach	(Hong Kong) Gao Wen
Men U14 Youth Team coach	
Women Team Head coach	(Hong Kong) Cheung Po Chun
Women U18 Youth Team coach	(Hong Kong) Cheung Po Chun
Women U15 Youth Team coach	(Hong Kong) Cheung Wai Ki
Kitchee Academy Director	(Hong Kong) Chu Chi Kwong
Kitchee Academy coach	(Hong Kong) Gao Wen
Kitchee Director of Elite Youth	(Portugal) Edgar Cardoso
Professional Footballer Preparatory Programme coach	(Hong Kong) Chu Chi Kwong
Club Consultant Doctor	(Hong Kong) Dr. Yung Shu Hang
Club Consultant Dietitian	(Hong Kong) Sylvia Lam

== Friendlies ==
Win Draw Loss

=== Pre-season friendly ===
Tour of Thailand (19-27 July)

19 July 2024 1	Police Tero F.C. (Thailand)	0–1	(Hong Kong) Kitchee SC	Racha Thewa
			Chen Ngo Hin 48'	Stadium: Windmill Football Club

23 July 2024 2	Port F.C. (Thailand)	1–1	(Hong Kong) Kitchee SC	Racha Thewa
	Bordin Phala 90'		Bae Jae-woo 20'	Stadium: Windmill Football Club

27 July 2024 3	BG Pathum United (Thailand)	3–1	(Hong Kong) Kitchee SC	Pathum Thani
			Temirov	Stadium: BG Stadium

7 August 2024 BOC Life Cup	Kitchee (Hong Kong)	1–6	(Spain) Atlético Madrid	Hong Kong
20:00 HKT (UTC+8)	Temirov 67'	Report	Sørloth 7', 8'; Martín 53'; Mouriño 63'; Niño 71'; Lemar 87'	Stadium: Hong Kong Stadium; Referee: Fong-Hei Lau (Hong Kong)

=== Mid-season friendly ===
9 November 2024	Guangxi Pingguo Haliao (China)	1–4	(Hong Kong) Kitchee	Guangxi
20:00 UTC+8			Poon Pui Hin 4'; Ngan Cheuk Pan 38'; Sherzod Temirov 45'	Stadium: Pingguo Stadium

Tour of Singapore (4 Jan 2025)

4 Jan 2025 1	Lion City Sailors (Singapore)	–	(Hong Kong) Kitchee SC	Jalan Besar
				Stadium: Jalan Besar Stadium

== Team statistics ==
=== Appearances and goals ===
As of 25 May 2025

No.	Pos.	Player	Premier League		FA Cup		Sapling Cup		Challenge Shield		Total	
No.	Pos.	Player	Apps	Goals	Apps	Goals	Apps	Goals	Apps	Goals	Apps	Goals
1	GK	(Hong Kong) (China) Wang Zhenpeng	3	0	0	0	0	0	1	0	4	0
2	DF	(Hong Kong) Law Tsz Chun	12+6	1	0+1	0	3+1	1	0	0	23	2
3	DF	(Hong Kong) (Scotland) Leon Jones	16+2	0	1	0	0	0	2	0	21	0
4	DF	(Brazil) Matheus Dantas	18	1	1	0	3	0	2	0	24	1
5	DF	(Hong Kong) (Brazil) Hélio	7+4	0	0+1	0	4	0	0	0	16	0
6	DF	(Hong Kong) (Japan) (England) (Scotland) Jay Haddow	6+3	0	0	0	1	1	0+1	0	11	1
7	FW	(Turkmenistan) Ruslan Mingazow	9+3	2	0	0	1+1	1	1	1	15	4
8	MF	(Hong Kong) Cheng Chin Lung	3+15	0	0	0	3	0	0	0	21	0
9	FW	(Brazil) Welthon	11+5	8	0	0	2+1	1	1	0	20	8
10	FW	(Portugal) Luís Machado	21+1	6	1	0	1+2	0	1	0	27	6
11	MF	(Hong Kong) Jordan Lam	15+4	0	1	0	4	0	2	0	26	0
12	DF	(South Korea) Bae Jae-woo	14+3	0	1	0	3+1	0	2	1	24	1
13	GK	(China) Ainikaer Maihemuti	0	0	0	0	0	0	0	0	0	0
14	FW	(Hong Kong) Poon Pui Hin	1+12	3	0	0	0	0	1+1	0	15	3
16	MF	(Hong Kong) Tan Chun Lok	8+1	0	0	0	0	0	1	0	10	0
17	DF	(Hong Kong) (Brazil) Fernando	17+7	4	1	1	0	0	0+2	0	27	5
18	FW	(Hong Kong) Chen Ngo Hin	3+10	1	0	0	3	0	0	0	16	1
20	MF	(Spain) Aarón Rey	21	6	1	1	4	1	2	0	28	8
21	FW	(Hong Kong) (England) Seb Buddle	0+1	0	0	0	0+1	0	0	0	2	0
22	DF	(Philippines) (Spain) Diego Bardanca	2+1	0	0	0	1+1	0	0	0	4	0
23	GK	(Hong Kong) Tuscany Shek	0	0	0	0	4	0	0	0	4	0
24	DF	(Hong Kong) Ngan Cheuk Pan	18+5	1	1	0	0	0	1+1	0	26	1
25	GK	(England) Fynn Talley	21	0	0	0	0	0	0	0	21	0
26	DF	(Hong Kong) (Japan) Sohgo Ichikawa	0+1	0	0	0	0	0	0	0	1	0
27	FW	(Uzbekistan) Sherzod Temirov	17+6	12	1	1	2+2	0	2	2	30	15
29	FW	(South Korea) Kim Shin-wook	0	0	0	0	0	0	0	0	0	0
30	FW	(Hong Kong) (Brazil) Juninho	20+2	9	1	0	0	0	2	0	25	9
31	FW	(Hong Kong) (England) Matthew Slattery	0+5	0	0	0	2	0	0	0	7	0
33	FW	(Hong Kong) Yeung Cheuk Kwan	0+2	0	0	0	0+2	0	0	0	4	0
34	DF	(Hong Kong) Jason Kam Chi Kin	1	0	0	0	1	0	0	0	2	0
38	MF	(Hong Kong) Wesley Yuen Ho Chan	0	0	0	0	0+3	0	0	0	3	0
51	MF	(Hong Kong) Cheung Yiu Hin	0	0	0	0	1	0	0	0	1	0
67	DF	(Hong Kong) Li Siu Hin	0	0	0	0	1	0	0	0	1	0
70	FW	(Hong Kong) Lam Pak Yin	0	0	0	0	0+1	0	0	0	1	0
Players who have played this season but had left the club or on loan to other club

== Competitions ==
=== Hong Kong Premier League ===
31 August 2024 1	North District	2–2	Kitchee	Sheung Shui, New Territories
16:00	Kendy Renato 85'; Matheus Chulapa 90'; Jahangir Khan (yellow card) 10'; Pedro Costa (yellow card) 45'	Report	Sherzod Temirov 22' (pen.); Juninho 70'; Tan Chun Lok (yellow card) 45'	Stadium: North District Sports Ground; Attendance: 685; Referee: Wong Wai Lun

14 September 2024 2	Kitchee	1–1	Southern	Mong Kok, Kowloon
18:30	Juninho 90'; Ruslan Mingazow (yellow card) 45'; Ngan Cheuk Pan (yellow card) 90+1'	Report	Gregory Rocha 40'; Chan Yun Tung (yellow card) 21'; Song Joo-ho (yellow card) 35'; Kessi (yellow card) 72'; Jonatan Leonel Acosta (yellow card) 88'	Stadium: Mong Kok Stadium; Attendance: 792; Referee: Tam Ping-wun

21 September 2024 3	Kitchee	8–0	Rangers	Mong Kok, Kowloon
18:30	Juninho 13'; Machado 21', 37'; Welthon 40', 56'; Mingazow 54'; Temirov 79'; Poon Pui Hin 88'; Jay Haddow (yellow card) 51'	Report	Chang Kwong Yin (yellow card) 50'; Kim Do-Hyun (yellow card) 51'	Stadium: Mong Kok Stadium; Attendance: 724; Referee: Wong Wai Lun

25 September 2024 4	Kitchee	6–1	Kowloon City	Mong Kok, Kowloon
20:00	Welthon 45'; Machado 51'; Temirov 55', 60', 85'; Chen Ngo Hin 90+1'; Tan Chun Lok (yellow card) 88'	Report	Kayron 65'; Ho Lung Ho (yellow card) 31'; Cheng Chun Wang (yellow card) 70'	Stadium: Mong Kok Stadium; Attendance: 649; Referee: Luk Kin Sun

5 October 2024 4	Kitchee	4–0	HKFC	Mong Kok, Kowloon
18:00	Rey 6'; Ngan Cheuk Pan 65'; Welthon 90+1', 90+6'; Luís Machado (yellow card) 28'; Jay Haddow (yellow card) 45'	Report	Habib Bah (yellow card) 45+2'; Lee Chun Yin (yellow card) 52'; Lai Hoi-To (yellow card) 90'	Stadium: Mong Kok Stadium; Attendance: 644; Referee: Poon Chun Kit

19 October 2024 6	Tai Po	1–0	Kitchee	Tai Po, New Territories
15:00	Lucas Silva 73'; Gabriel Pierini (yellow card) 45+1'; Igor Sartori (yellow card) 90+1'	Report	Law Tsz Chun (yellow card) 26'; Luís Machado (yellow card) 49'; Ruslan Mingazow (yellow card) 90+7'	Stadium: Tai Po Sports Ground; Attendance: 1,315; Referee: Wong Wai-lun

2 November 2024 7	Kitchee	1–1	Lee Man	Mong Kok, Kowloon
18:00	Poon Pui Hin 45+1'; Ruslan Mingazow (yellow card) 14'; Jordan Lam (yellow card) 20'; Matheus Dantas (yellow card) 70'; Luís Machado (yellow card) 81'; Aarón Rey (yellow card) 90+1'	Report	Henri Anier 35' (yellow card) 10'; Mitchel Paulissen (yellow card) 38'; Dudu (yellow card) 78'; Ryoya Tachibana (yellow card) 83'; Everton Camargo (yellow card) 90+3'	Stadium: Mong Kok Stadium; Attendance: 1,682; Referee: Liu Kwok Man

24 November 2024 8	Kowloon City	0–5	Kitchee	Sham Shui Po, Kowloon
15:00	Chiu Wan Chun (yellow card) 26'; Diego Eli (yellow card) 45+5'; Tsang Ka-Chun (yellow card) 79'; Yim Kai Cheuk (yellow card) 87'	Report	Welthon 13'; Aarón Rey 19' (yellow card) 45+5'; Poon Pui Hin 28'; Ruslan Mingazow 30' (red card) 45+6'; Juninho 35' (yellow card) 45+5'; Bae Jae-Woo (yellow card) 45+7'; Fynn Talley (yellow card) 77'	Stadium: Sham Shui Po Sports Ground; Attendance: 621; Referee: Liu Kwok-man

11 January 2025 9	Southern	1–1	Kitchee	Aberdeen, Hong Kong Island
15:00	Jackson Franklim de Sousa 19'; Chak Ting Fung (yellow card) 50'; Shu Sasaki (yellow card) 57'; Mahama Awal (yellow card) 61'; Raphaël Merkies (yellow card) 64'	Report	Luís Machado 55' (yellow card) 79'; Ngan Cheuk Pan (yellow card) 31'	Stadium: Aberdeen Sports Ground; Attendance: 465; Referee: Lau Fong-hei

18 January 2025 10	Eastern	1–1	Kitchee	Mong Kok, Kowloon
18:00	Baffoe 32' (pen.); Nii Noye Narh (yellow card) 45+4'; Leung Kwun Chung (yellow card) 57'; Ma Hei Wai (yellow card) 66'; JoJo Alexander (yellow card) 81'	Report	Machado 16'; Talley Flynn (yellow card) 30'; Law Tsz Chun (yellow card) 49'; Dantes Matheus (yellow card) 78'	Stadium: Mong Kok Stadium; Attendance: 1,748; Referee: Tam Ping Wun

26 January 2025 11	Tai Po	1–2	Kitchee	Tai Po, New Territories
15:00	Renner 11'; Marcão (yellow card) 90'	Report	Temirov 29' (yellow card) 72'; Fernando 45+6' (pen.); Leon James (yellow card) 45+10'; Aaron Rey (yellow card) 60'	Stadium: Tai Po Sports Ground; Attendance: 1,502; Referee: Wong Wai Lun

2 February 2025 12	Kitchee	3–0	Eastern	Mong Kok, Kowloon
18:00	Temirov 8'; Fernando 31'; Rey 45+4'; Dantes Matheus (yellow card) 12'; Luís Machado (yellow card) 75'; Welthon (yellow card) 90'	Report	Callum Hall (yellow card) 14'; Alexander Jojo (yellow card) 46'	Stadium: Mong Kok Stadium; Attendance: 1,589; Referee: Liu Kwok Man

9 February 2025 13	Rangers	1–2	Kitchee	Tsing Yi, New Territories
15:00	Lau Chi Lok 28'; Yiu Ho Ming (yellow card) 90'	Report	Welthon 54', 70'; Leon Jones (yellow card) 22'; Aaron Rey (yellow card) 45'; Fernando (yellow card) 63'; Juninho (yellow card) 76'; Bae Jae-Woo (yellow card) 90'	Stadium: Tsing Yi Sports Ground; Attendance: 400; Referee: Luk Kin Sun

16 February 2025 14	HKFC	1–3	Kitchee	Happy Valley, Hong Kong Island
16:30	Callum Beattie 32'; Daniel Scally (yellow card) 51'; Chun-Hin Tsang (yellow card) 63'; Andrew Russell (yellow card) 90+3'	Report	Fernando 45+4'; Callum Beattie 48' (o.g.); Temirov 90+7'; Matheus Dantas (yellow card) 75'; Poon Pui Hin (yellow card) 90+3'	Stadium: Hong Kong Football Club Stadium; Attendance: 801; Referee: Liu Kwok Man

26 February 2025 15	Kitchee	2–3	Kowloon City	Mong Kok, Kowloon
20:00	Rey 38'; Juninho 45+7'; Heilo (yellow card) 23'; Cheng Chin Lung (yellow card) 57'; Jay Haddow (yellow card) 90+10'	Report	Yang Chao-jing 71'; Willian 72'; Kayron 76'; Yoshihiro Tanaka (yellow card) 20'; Kang Jun-hyeon (yellow card) 63'; Willian Leonardo Machado (yellow card) 73'	Stadium: Mong Kok Stadium; Attendance: 667; Referee: Liu Kwok Man

8 March 2025 16	Kitchee	5–0	North District	Mong Kok, Kowloon
15:00	Luís Machado 17'; Aarón Rey 34'; Juninho 35', 78' (yellow card) 80'; Sherzod Temirov 79'; Jordan Lam (yellow card) 49' (yellow-red card) 58'; Ngan Cheuk Pan (yellow card) 60'	Report	Law Hiu Chung (yellow card) 68'	Stadium: Mong Kok Stadium; Attendance: 614; Referee: Tang Hing-fu

15 March 2025 17	Kitchee	0–1	Lee Man	Mong Kok, Kowloon
18:00	Juninho (yellow card) 28'; Sherzod Temirov (yellow card) 33'; Law Tsz Chun (yellow card) 58'	Report	Everton 67'; Ryoya Tachibana (yellow card) 62'; Samuel Rosa (yellow card) 77'; Mitchel Paulissen (yellow card) 78'; Li Ngai Hoi (yellow card) 81'; Wu Chun Ming (yellow card) 87'	Stadium: Mong Kok Stadium; Referee: Wong Wai-lun

29 March 2025 18	Southern	0–3	Kitchee	Aberdeen, Hong Kong Island
15:00	Chak Ting Fung (yellow card) 4'; Song Ju-ho (yellow card) 40'; Kessi (yellow card) 69'; Chan Yun Tung (yellow card) 89'	Report	Juninho 50'; Sherzod Temirov 60' (yellow card) 42'; Law Tsz Chun 62'; Leon Jones (yellow card) 89'	Stadium: Aberdeen Sports Ground; Referee: Liu Kwok-man

5 April 2025 19	Kitchee	1–2	North District	Mong Kok, Kowloon
18:00	Ngan Cheuk Pan (yellow card) 13'; Jordan Lam (yellow card) 36'; Matheus Dantes (yellow card) 79'	Report	Kendy 52', 90+8' (yellow card) 90+9'; Guilherme Kayron (yellow card) 69'; Wong Wai Kwok (yellow card) 79'	Stadium: Mong Kok Stadium; Attendance: 526; Referee: Wong Wai-lun

12 April 2025 20	Lee Man	4–0	Kitchee	Tseung Kwan O, New Territories
18:00	Everton Camargo 3'; Dudu 31' (yellow card) 21'; Henri Anier 58'; Mitchel Paulissen 60'	Report	Aaron Rey (yellow card) 30'; Juninho (yellow card) 45'	Stadium: Tseung Kwan O Sports Ground; Attendance: 634; Referee: Lau Fong-hei

26 April 2025 21	Kitchee	3–1	HKFC	Mong Kok, Kowloon
15:00	Matheus Dantes 20'; Fernando 75' (yellow card) 90+1'; Juninho 88'; Jordan Lam (yellow card) 85'	Report	Leo 2' (pen.); Auston Kranick (yellow card) 24'; Toby Down (yellow card) 43'	Stadium: Mong Kok Stadium; Attendance: 511; Referee: Wong Po Sing

4 May 2025 22	Rangers	0–1	Kitchee	Tsing Yi, New Territories
15:00		Report	Sherzod Temirov 64'; Ngan Cheuk Pan (yellow card) 21'; Fernando (yellow card) 80'; Leon James (red card) 86'	Stadium: Tsing Yi Sports Ground; Referee: Ho Wai Sing

17 May 2025 23	Kitchee	0–1	Tai Po	Mong Kok, Kowloon
18:00	Hélio (yellow card) 48' (yellow-red card) 70'	Report	Law Chun Ting 41' (yellow card) 38'; Fung Kwun Ming (yellow card) 68'	Stadium: Mong Kok Stadium; Referee: Tam Ping-wun

25 May 2025 24	Eastern	1–1	Kitchee	Mong Kok, Kowloon
15:00	Baffoe 84' (pen.); Víctor Bertomeu (yellow card) 69'; Siu Ching (yellow card) 90'	Report	Sherzod Temirov 70' (pen.); Matheus Dantes (yellow card) 52'; Leon Jones (yellow card) 82'	Stadium: Mong Kok Stadium; Attendance: 787; Referee: Yu Kin-fung

Pos	Team	Pld	W	D	L	GF	GA	GD	Pts	Qualification or relegation
2	Lee Man	24	17	2	5	54	33	+21	53	
3	Eastern	24	15	6	3	54	25	+29	51	Qualification for AFC Champions League Two group stage (Note: Eastern qualified for the AFC Champions League Two group stage as the 2024–25 Hong Kong FA Cup winners.)
4	Kitchee	24	12	6	6	55	25	+30	42	
5	Southern	24	7	7	10	34	35	−1	28	
6	Kowloon City	24	7	3	14	36	65	−29	24	

Source: Hong Kong Football Association
Rules for classification: 1) Points; 2) Head-to-head points; 3) Head-to-head goal difference; 4) Head-to-head goals scored; 5) Goal difference; 6) Goals scored; 7) Fair-play points; 8) Drawing lots (Play-off if the winner has to be decided).

=== Hong Kong Sapling Cup ===
16 November 2024 Group Match 1	North District	1–1	Kitchee	Sheung Shui, New Territories
15:00	Chulapa 22'; Guilherme (yellow card) 75'; Yip Cheuk Man (yellow card) 90+5'	Report	Welthon 15'; Jason Kam (yellow card) 43'; Helio (yellow card) 80'	Stadium: North District Sports Ground; Attendance: 288; Referee: Wong Po Sing

8 December 2024 Group Match 2	Kitchee	3–1	HKFC	Diamond Hill, Kowloon
15:00	Law Tsz Chun 11'; Rey 27'; Mingazow 30'; Bae Jae-Woo (yellow card) 2'	Report	Scally 36'; Andy Russell (yellow card) 68'	Stadium: Hammer Hill Road Sports Ground; Attendance: 232; Referee: Luk Kin Sun

15 December 2024 Group Match 3	Kitchee	0–3	Tai Po	Tsing Yi, New Territories
18:00	Welthon (yellow card) 45'; Bae Jae-Woo (yellow card) 58'	Report	Marcão 60'; Renner 67'; Sartori 90'; Wang-Ngai Kohki Sung (yellow card) 81'; Weverton Rangel Ribeiro (yellow card) 83'	Stadium: Tsing Yi Sports Ground; Attendance: 290; Referee: Wong Po Sing

22 March 2025 Group Match 4	Eastern	1–1	Kitchee	Siu Sai Wan, Hong Kong Island
18:00	Gao Ming Ho 86'; Yeung Tung Ki (yellow card) 34'	Report	Jay Haddow 50' (yellow card) 72'; Matheus Dantas (yellow card) 87'	Stadium: Siu Sai Wan Sports Ground; Referee: Luk Kin-sun

=== Hong Kong FA Cup ===
1 March 2025 Quarter-finals	Kitchee	2–3 (a.e.t.)	Tai Po	Mong Kok
	Fernando 14'; Temirov 26'; Matheus Dantas (yellow card) 69'; Aaron Rey (yellow card) 80'	Report	Chan Siu Kwan 39', 83', 115' (yellow card) 116'; Habib (yellow card) 45'; Weverton Rangel (yellow card) 45+12'; Igor Sartori (yellow card) 90+1'	Stadium: Mong Kok Stadium; Attendance: 1,648; Referee: Lau Fong Hei

=== Hong Kong Senior Challenge Shield ===
26 October 2024 Quarter Final	Kitchee	3–1	Tai Po	Mong Kok, Kowloon
15:00	Bae Jae-woo 30'; Sherzod Temirov 38'; Ruslan Mingazow 64' (yellow card) 38'; Aarón Rey (yellow card) 45'; Wang Zhenpeng (yellow card) 62'; Matheus Dantas (yellow card) 90'	Report	Gabriel Cividini 52'; Nicholas Benavides (yellow card) 27'; Weverton (yellow card) 67'; Chan Siu Kwan (yellow card) 69'	Stadium: Mong Kok Stadium; Referee: Luk Kin-sun

1 December 2024 Semi Final	Lee Man	2–1	Kitchee	Mong Kok, Kowloon
15:00	Anier 16'; Everton 47'; Ngan Lok Fung (yellow card) 26'; Paulinho Simionato (yellow card) 90+1'; Wu Chun-Ming (yellow card) 90+3'	Report	Temirov 45+4'; Bae Jae-woo (yellow card) 34'; Juninho (yellow card) 85'	Stadium: Mong Kok Stadium; Attendance: 1,573; Referee: Lau Fong Hei

=== Hong Kong U22 League ===
2 October 2024 1	Kitchee	1–2	Tai Po	Tseung Kwan O, New Territories
18:30	Wesley Chan Yuen-Ho 36'	Report	Lee Lok-Him 89', 90+1'	Stadium: Jockey Club HKFA Football Training Centre

15 October 2024 2	Lee Man	0–0	Kitchee	Siu Sai Wan, Eastern District
19:30		Report		Stadium: Siu Sai Wan Sports Ground

6 November 2024 3	North District	3–2	Kitchee	Tseung Kwan O, New Territories
20:30	Chu Wai Kwan 45' (pen.), 70' (yellow card) 46'; Ng Pak Hei 49'	Report	Chen Tao 13'; Jay Haddow 40'	Stadium: Jockey Club HKFA Football Training Centre

19 February 2025 4 (Rescheduled)	Kitchee	2–0	Eastern	Tin Shui Wai, Hong Kong
18:30	Li Siu Kin 25'; Matthew Slattery 31'	Report		Stadium: Tin Yip Road Park

20 November 2024 5	Kitchee	1–2	Southern	Tin Shui Wai, Hong Kong
20:30	Matthew Slattery 3'; Seb Buddle (yellow card) 25'; Cheung Ka Man (yellow card) 74'; Yiu Tsz-Leong (yellow card) 75'	Report	Cheung Kwok Fung 5'; Raphaël Merkies 54'; Ho Yung (yellow card) 48'	Stadium: Tin Yip Road Park

4 December 2024 6	Tai Po	0–1	Kitchee	Tseung Kwan O, New Territories
20:30	Sung Wang Ngai Kohki Takizawa (yellow card) 66'	Report	Li Siu Hin 60'; Chen Tao (yellow card) 62'; Seb Buddle (yellow card) 88'	Stadium: Jockey Club HKFA Football Training Centre

18 December 2024 7	Rangers	2–1	Kitchee	Tseung Kwan O, New Territories
20:30	Luizinho 44'; Vito Wong 90+2'	Report	Cheng Chin Lung 54'	Stadium: Jockey Club HKFA Football Training Centre

8 January 2025 8	HKFC	1–3	Kitchee	Tseung Kwan O, New Territories
20:30	Jack John Bennie 88'	Report	Chen Ngo Hin 8' (pen.); Matthew Slattery 40', 85'	Stadium: Jockey Club HKFA Football Training Centre

22 January 2025 9	Lee Man	1–2	Kitchee	Tseung Kwan O, New Territories
20:30	Hon Shing Wing 55'	Report	Li Siu Hin 15'; Jason Kam 83'	Stadium: Jockey Club HKFA Football Training Centre

2 February 2025 10	Kitchee	4–1	North District	Kai Tak, Kowloon
20:30	Li Siu Hin 1'; Matthew Slattery 34'; Chen Ngo Hin 45'; Yeung Cheuk-Kwan 59'	Report	Guilherme Kayron 70'	Stadium: Kai Tak Sports Park

11 February 2025 11	Eastern	0–5	Kitchee	Siu Sai Wan, Eastern District
19:30		Report	Matthew Slattery 5', 17', 40'; Lam Pak Yin 62'; Chen Tao 90+2'	Stadium: Siu Sai Wan Sports Ground

16 April 2025 12 (Rescheduled)	Southern	0–3	Kitchee	Tseung Kwan O, New Territories
20:30		Report		Stadium: Jockey Club HKFA Football Training Centre

12 March 2025 13	Kitchee	5–0	HKFC	Tseung Kwan O, New Territories
20:30	Matthew Slattery 61', 88'; Yiu Tsz Leong 68'; Chen Ngoh Hin 71'; Chen Tao 72'	Report		Stadium: Jockey Club HKFA Football Training Centre

22 April 2025 14 (Rescheduled)	Kitchee	0–4	Rangers	Tseung Kwan O, New Territories
20:30		Report		Stadium: Jockey Club HKFA Football Training Centre

League table

Pos	Team	Pld	W	D	L	GF	GA	GD	Pts	Qualification or relegation
1	Rangers	14	12	0	2	46	15	+31	36	Winner
2	Southern	14	10	1	3	23	11	+12	31	
3	Tai Po	14	9	1	4	33	21	+12	28	
4	Kitchee	14	8	1	5	30	16	+14	25	
5	HKFC	14	6	1	7	30	23	+7	19	
6	North District	14	4	1	9	22	40	−18	13	
7	Eastern	14	3	0	11	13	38	−25	9	
8	Lee Man	14	1	1	12	9	42	−33	4	

Updated to match(es) played on 31 May 2025. Source: Hong Kong Football Association
Rules for classification: 1) Points; 2) Head-to-head points; 3) Head-to-head goal difference; 4) Head-to-head goals scored; 5) Goal difference; 6) Goals scored; 7) Fair-play points; 8) Drawing lots (Play-off if the winner has to be decided).

=== Hong Kong U22 FA Cup ===
7 May 2025 Quarter Final	Rangers	0–5	Kitchee	Tseung Kwan O, New Territories
		Report	Chan Shing Chun 55'; Chen Ngo Hin 74'; Matthew Slattery 87'; Sherzod Terimov 90+2'; Poon Pui Hin 90+4'	Stadium: Jockey Club HKFA Football Training Centre

14 May 2025 Semi Final	Kitchee	3–1	Eastern	Kowloon, Hong Kong
	Chen Ngo Hin 42'; Yeung Cheuk Kwan 57'; Juninho 71'	Report	Ma Hei Wai 54'	Stadium: Kowloon Bay Park

21 May 2025 Final	Kitchee	3–1	Southern	Kowloon, Hong Kong
	Matthew Slattery 10'; Chan Shing Chun 48'; Sherzod Terimov 90+5'	Report	Aidan Chong 29'	Stadium: Kowloon Bay Park; Referee: Woo Chun-sing
