= Asier Illarramendi =

Spanish footballer

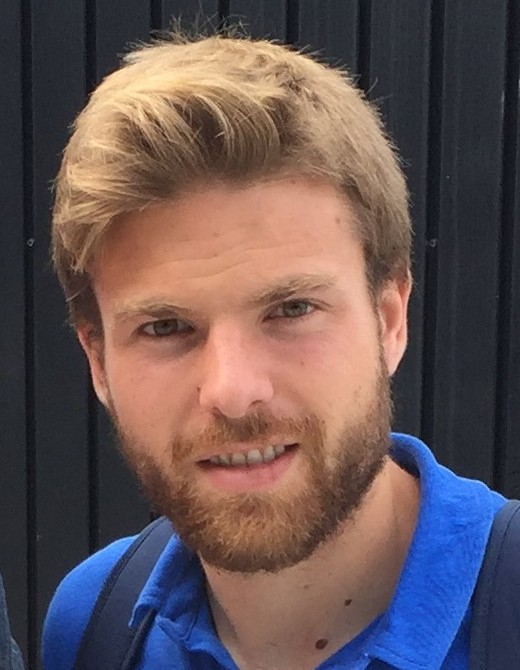
- Illarramendi in 2016

Personal information
- Full name: Asier Illarramendi Andonegi
- Date of birth: 8 March 1990 (age 36)
- Place of birth: Mutriku, Spain
- Height: 1.79 m (5 ft 10 in)
- Position: Defensive midfielder

Team information
- Current team: Kitchee
- Number: 5

Youth career
- Real Sociedad

Senior career*
Years	Team	Apps	(Gls)
2008–2011	Real Sociedad B	93	(7)
2010–2013	Real Sociedad	54	(0)
2013–2015	Real Madrid	59	(2)
2015–2023	Real Sociedad	167	(11)
2023–2024	FC Dallas	36	(2)
2025–	Kitchee	20	(1)

International career
2006–2007	Spain U17	12	(0)
2009	Spain U19	1	(0)
2011–2013	Spain U21	16	(0)
2012	Spain U23	2	(0)
2017	Spain	3	(1)
2013–2018	Basque Country	4	(1)
- * Club domestic league appearances and goals as of 23:06, 21 November 2026 (UTC)

Asier Illarramendi "Illarra" Andonegi (Spanish pronunciation: [aˈsjeɾ iʎaraˈmendi iˈʎara andoˈneɣi]; born 8 March 1990) is a Spanish professional footballer who plays as a defensive midfielder for Hong Kong Premier League club Kitchee.

He developed at Real Sociedad, helping them to qualify for the Champions League in 2013. He then transferred to Real Madrid for €32.2 million, the most they had ever paid for a Spanish player, returning to his first club for half of that fee two years later.

Illarramendi earned 31 caps for Spain from under-17 to under-23 level, winning the 2013 European Championship with the under-21 side. He made his senior debut in 2017.

== Club career ==
=== Real Sociedad ===
A product of local Real Sociedad's youth system, Illarramendi was born in Mutriku, Gipuzkoa, and he spent the vast majority of his first four senior seasons with the B team, contributing 27 games and two goals in 2009–10 as the Basques returned to Segunda División B after one year out. On 19 June 2010, in the last day of the Segunda División campaign, as the first team had already sealed promotion to La Liga as champions, he made his first official appearance, in a 4–1 away loss against Elche CF.

On 23 January 2011, Illarramendi made his top-division debut, in a 2–1 defeat at Villarreal CF. The following month, he first appeared as a starter and played the full 90 minutes in another away loss (4–1 to RCD Espanyol); the bulk of the season was spent, however, with the reserves in the third tier.

Illarramendi started in all of his 32 league appearances in 2012–13, as Real Sociedad finished fourth and qualified for the UEFA Champions League for the first time in ten years. At the LFP Awards, he was named Breakthrough Player and Best Midfielder.

=== Real Madrid ===
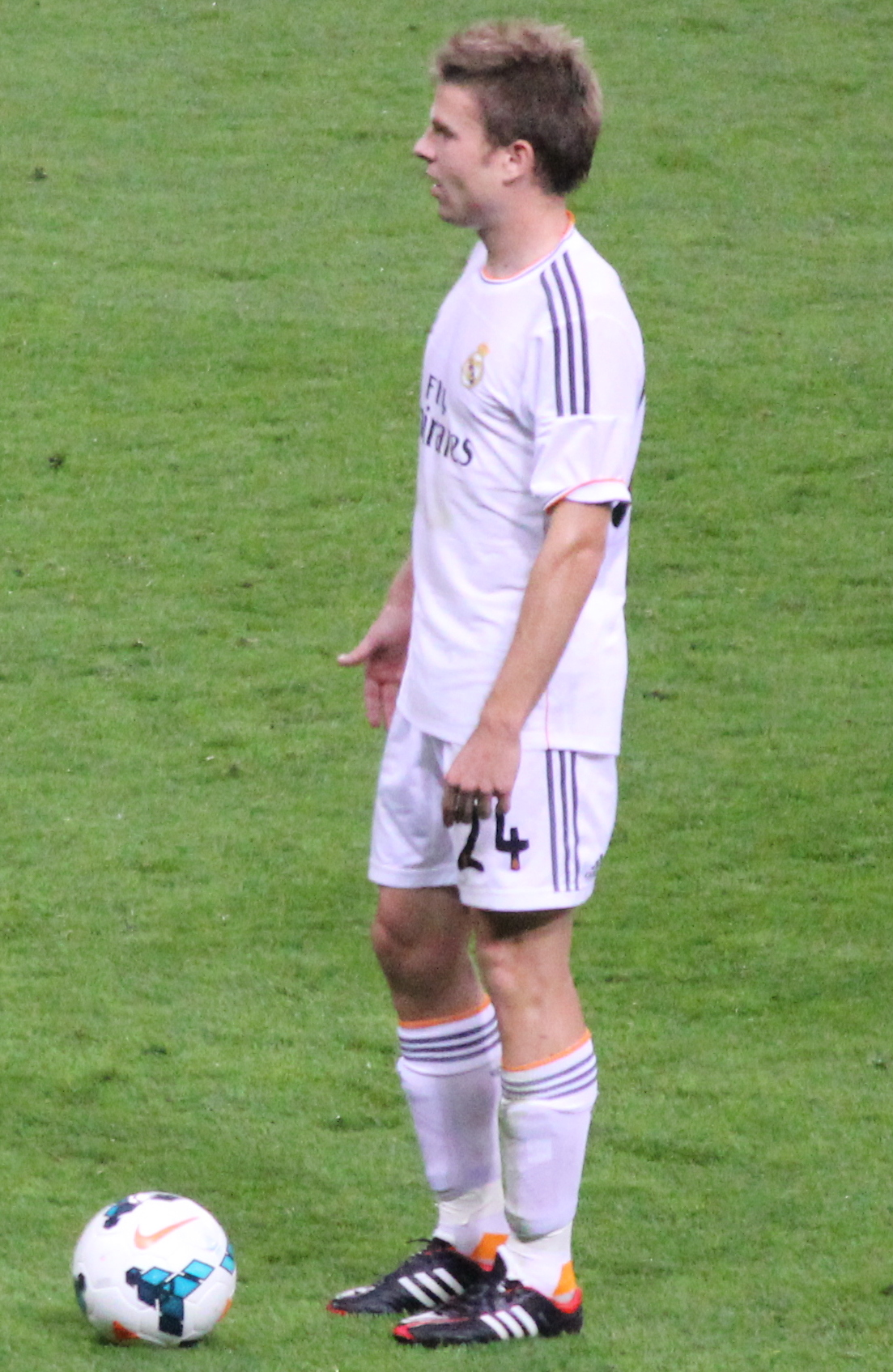
Illarramendi in 2013

On 12 July 2013, Illarramendi signed a six-year contract with Real Madrid for a fee of €32.2 million, the highest amount paid by the club for a Spanish player. He made his official debut on 14 September by starting in a 2–2 away draw against Villarreal, and scored his first goal on 18 December in a 2–0 home win over CD Olímpic de Xàtiva in the round of 32 of the Copa del Rey (also the aggregate score).

Illarramendi scored his first league goal for the Merengues on 22 February 2014, after his long-range effort against Elche was deflected and the hosts won 3–0. His second came on 5 April, when he opened an eventual 4–0 victory at his former team Real Sociedad in the 44th minute. He was a regular in the domestic cup campaign, coming on as a late substitute for Ángel Di María in the 2–1 final defeat of FC Barcelona, adding 11 matches – five starts – in the team's Champions League run but remaining on the bench as they clinched the trophy against Atlético Madrid in the final at the Estádio da Luz.

Illarramendi began his second year with a brief substitute appearance in the 2014 UEFA Super Cup triumph against compatriots Sevilla FC at the Cardiff City Stadium, and was also part of Real Madrid's squad which won the FIFA Club World Cup in Morocco, playing the entirety of the 4–0 semi-final win over Cruz Azul.

=== Return to Real Sociedad ===
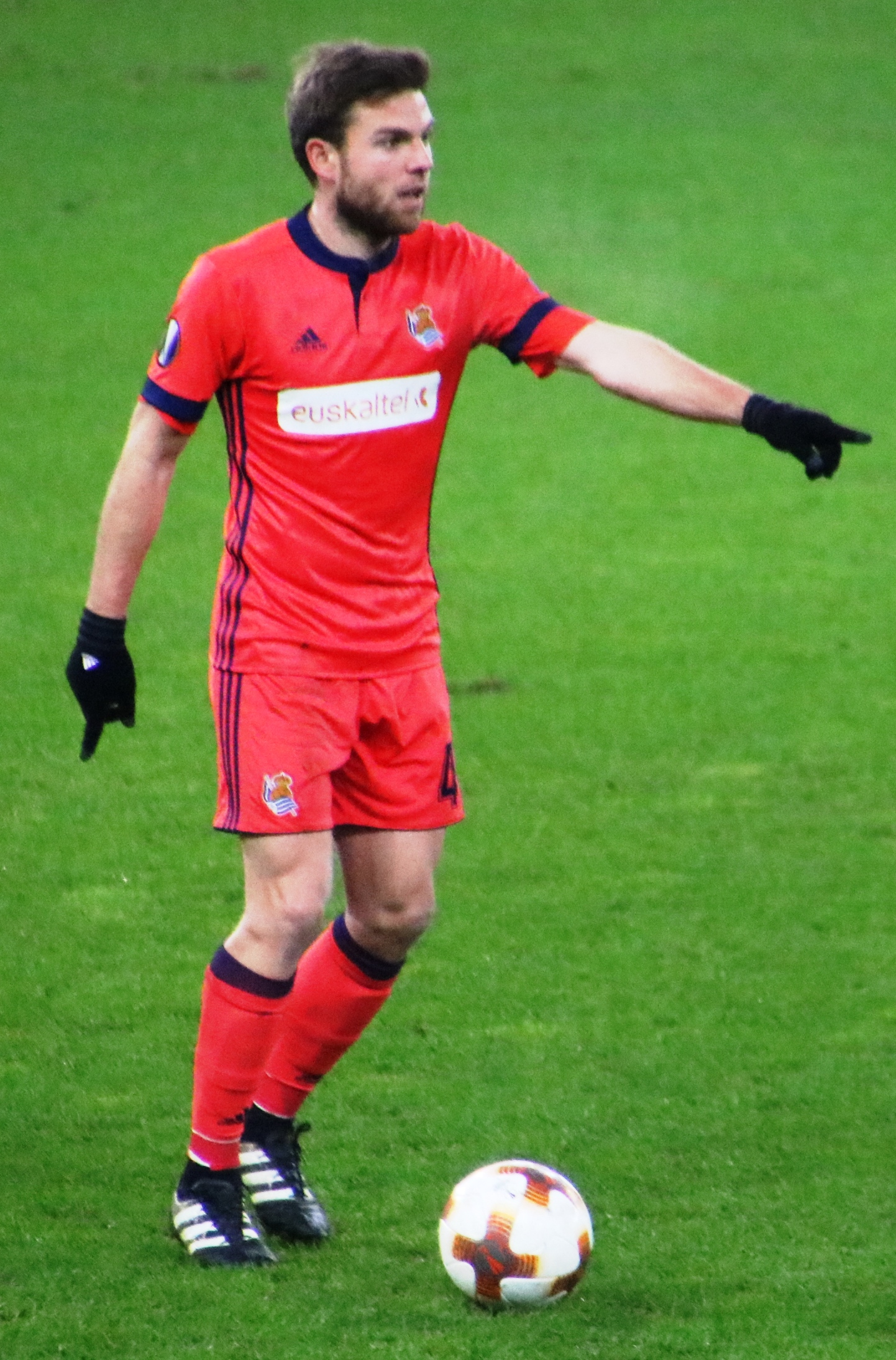
Illarramendi in 2018

On 26 August 2015, Illarramendi returned to Real Sociedad, signing a six-year deal– the transfer fee was not officially disclosed by the clubs, but was stated in the media as being between €15–17 million, around half of the figure paid in the opposite direction two years previously. He made his league debut in his second spell three days later, starting and being booked in a 0–0 home draw against Sporting de Gijón. He recorded his first goal for the team in his second spell on 25 October, in a 4–0 win at Levante UD.

In the 2016–17 campaign, Illarramendi had the second-highest number of interceptions across Europe's five major leagues behind only Chelsea's N'Golo Kante. However, he was also noted for his poor disciplinary record, having racked up ten yellow cards by March 2017 including one in each of his four previous games.

Illarramendi scored a career-best seven goals in 2017–18, including braces in home and away victories over Deportivo de La Coruña. He had already exceeded his professional output for his whole career by February with his fifth goal.

On 30 August 2019, Illarramendi suffered a broken fibula in a Basque derby match against Athletic Bilbao; it was presumed the injury would keep him out for a few months, but it was found he required surgery to his shin and ankle ligaments, and he did not feature again prior to the season being halted in March 2020 due to the COVID-19 pandemic in Spain. The delay seemed to have given him time to return before its conclusion, but in June 2020 he suffered a further muscle injury on the training ground, and made no further appearances.

On 24 May 2023, it was announced that captain Illarramendi would leave the Anoeta Stadium on 30 June.

=== FC Dallas ===
On 3 August 2023, Illarramendi signed with Major League Soccer club FC Dallas on a deal until the end of the season. He finished his first full campaign with 25 games (22 starts) and two goals; additionally, he had a 90% passing rate and recovered the ball 157 times.

Illarramendi was not retained for the 2025 season.

=== Kitchee ===
Illarramendi moved countries again on 10 September 2025, with the 35-year-old joining Hong Kong Premier League's Kitchee SC.

== International career ==
Illarramendi helped Spain to reach the final of the 2007 FIFA U-17 World Cup, featuring in all games but one. He missed one of the penalties in the final shootout, which allowed Nigeria to lift the trophy.

Illarramendi played 16 times for the under-21s in two years. He represented them at the 2013 UEFA European Championship in Israel, being first choice as the nation won the competition and being selected in the team of the tournament.

Manager Julen Lopetegui first called up Illarramendi for the senior side in March 2017, ahead of a 2018 FIFA World Cup qualifier against Israel and a friendly with France. Additionally, he played for the Basque XI from 2013 onwards, opening a 3–1 win over FIFA member Tunisia at the San Mamés Stadium on 30 December 2016.

Illarramendi made his debut for Spain on 7 June 2017, playing the full 90 minutes in a 2–2 friendly draw with Colombia in Murcia. He scored his first goal on 9 October that year, netting the game's only in Israel for the World Cup qualifying campaign.

== Career statistics ==
=== Club ===
As of match played 26 September 2026

Appearances and goals by club, season and competition
Club	Season	League			National cup (Note: Includes Copa del Rey, U.S. Open Cup, Hong Kong FA Cup)		League cup (Note: Includes Hong Kong League Cup)		Continental		Other		Total	
Club	Season	Division	Apps	Goals	Apps	Goals	Apps	Goals	Apps	Goals	Apps	Goals	Apps	Goals
Real Sociedad B	2007–08	Segunda División B	7	0	—		—		—		—		7	0
Real Sociedad B	2008–09	Segunda División B	31	2	—		—		—		—		31	0
Real Sociedad B	2009–10	Tercera División	27	2	—		—		—		—		27	2
Real Sociedad B	2010–11	Segunda División B	28	3	—		—		—		—		28	3
Real Sociedad B	Total		93	7	—		—		—		—		93	7
Real Sociedad	2009–10	Segunda División	1	0	0	0	—		—		—		1	0
Real Sociedad	2010–11	La Liga	3	0	0	0	—		—		—		3	0
Real Sociedad	2011–12	La Liga	18	0	0	0	—		—		—		18	0
Real Sociedad	2012–13	La Liga	32	0	2	0	—		—		—		34	0
Real Sociedad	Total		54	0	2	0	—		—		—		56	0
Real Madrid	2013–14	La Liga	29	2	9	1	—		11 (Note: Appearances in UEFA Champions League)	0	—		49	3
Real Madrid	2014–15	La Liga	30	0	2	0	—		7	0	2 (Note: One appearance in UEFA Super Cup, one appearance in FIFA Club World Cup)	0	41	0
Real Madrid	Total		59	2	11	1	—		18	0	2	0	90	3
Real Sociedad	2015–16	La Liga	33	1	2	0	—		—		—		35	1
Real Sociedad	2016–17	La Liga	34	1	5	0	—		—		—		39	1
Real Sociedad	2017–18	La Liga	36	7	0	0	—		8 (Note: Appearances in UEFA Europa League)	0	—		44	7
Real Sociedad	2018–19	La Liga	23	1	3	0	—		—		—		26	1
Real Sociedad	2019–20	La Liga	3	0	0	0	—		—		—		3	0
Real Sociedad	2020–21	La Liga	6	0	2	0	—		1	0	0	0	9	0
Real Sociedad	2021–22	La Liga	8	0	1	0	—		1	0	—		10	0
Real Sociedad	2022–23	La Liga	24	1	3	0	—		4	0	—		31	1
Real Sociedad	Total		167	11	16	0	—		14	0	0	0	197	11
Real Sociedad	Real Sociedad total		221	11	18	0	—		14	0	0	0	253	11
FC Dallas	2023	Major League Soccer	11	0	—		—		—		3 (Note: Appearances in MLS Cup playoffs)	0	14	0
FC Dallas	2024	Major League Soccer	25	2	3	0	—		—		0	0	28	2
FC Dallas	Total		36	2	3	0	—		—		3	0	42	2
Kitchee	2025–26	Hong Kong Premier League	14	1	1	0	1	1	—		0	0	16	2
Kitchee	2026–27	Hong Kong Premier League	3	0	0	0	1	0	1 (Note: Appearance in AFC Champions League Two)	0	0	0	5	0
Kitchee	Total		17	1	1	0	2	1	1	0	0	0	21	2
Career total			421	23	33	1	2	1	33	0	5	0	499	25

=== International ===
Appearances and goals by national team and year
National team	Year	Apps	Goals
Spain	2017	3	1
Total		3	1

Scores and results list Spain's goal tally first, score column indicates score after each Illarramendi goal.

List of international goals scored by Asier Illarramendi
No.	Date	Venue	Opponent	Score	Result	Competition	Ref.
1	9 October 2017	Teddy Stadium, Jerusalem, Israel	Israel	1–0	1–0	2018 FIFA World Cup qualification	

== Honours ==
Real Sociedad

- Copa del Rey: 2019–20
- Segunda División: 2009–10

Real Madrid

- Copa del Rey: 2013–14
- UEFA Champions League: 2013–14
- UEFA Super Cup: 2014
- FIFA Club World Cup: 2014

Kitchee

- Hong Kong Premier League: 2025–26

Spain U21

- UEFA European Under-21 Championship: 2013

Individual

- La Liga Awards: Breakthrough Player/Best Midfielder 2012–13
- Hong Kong Footballer of the Year: 2025–26
