= Jay Haddow =

Hong Kong footballer (born 2004)

Jay Haddow 慈英
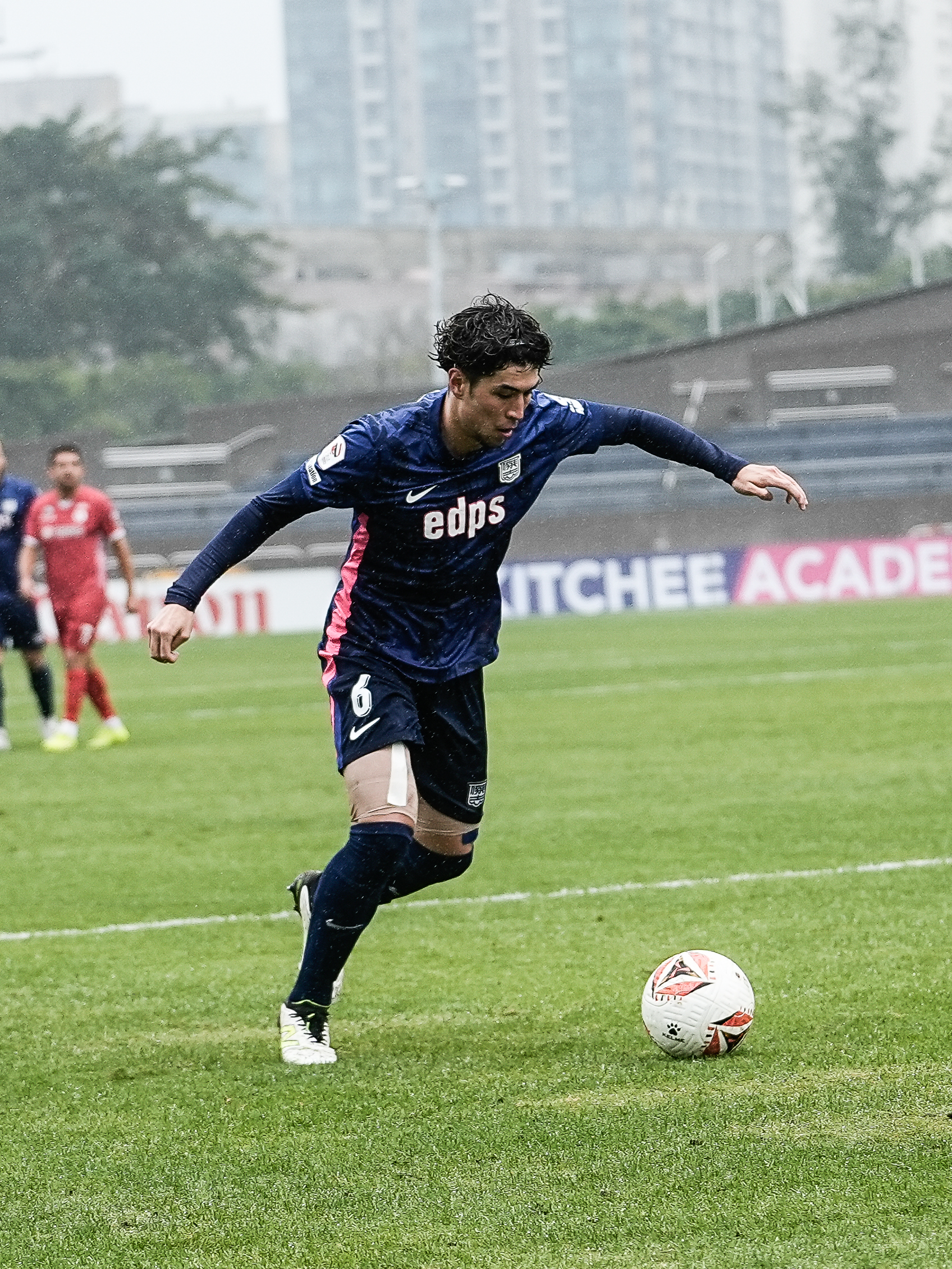

Personal information
- Full name: Jay Maeda Haddow
- Date of birth: 2 April 2004 (age 22)
- Place of birth: Hong Kong
- Height: 1.77 m (5 ft 10 in)
- Position: Defender

Team information
- Current team: Kitchee
- Number: 6

Youth career
- 2012–2016: Kitchee
- 2016–2024: Blackburn Rovers

Senior career*
Years	Team	Apps	(Gls)
2024–	Kitchee	41	(1)

International career^{‡}
2022	Japan U-19	2	(0)
2025–	Hong Kong U-22	3	(0)
2026–	Hong Kong	1	(0)
- * Club domestic league appearances and goals as of 20:04, 21 November 2026 (UTC) ‡ National team caps and goals as of 9 June 2026

Jay Maeda Haddow (Chinese: 慈英; Japanese: 前田 ハドー 慈英 Maeda Hadō Jiei; born 2 April 2004) is a professional footballer who currently plays as a defender for Hong Kong Premier League club Kitchee and the Hong Kong national team.

== Club career ==
=== Early career ===
Haddow started his career with Kitchee in Hong Kong, where he played from the age of eight until twelve. He moved to England and signed for Blackburn Rovers in 2016. Haddow signed a two-year scholarship term with Blackburn Rovers in July 2020. During his scholarship Haddow made 40 appearances for the U18s and 12 appearances for the U23s in all competitions.

On 14 July 2022, it was announced that Haddow had signed a professional contract with Blackburn Rovers. Despite interest from other Premier League and Championship clubs, Haddow signed for Blackburn on a two-year contract up until the summer of 2024.

On 18 May 2024, it was confirmed Haddow would be leaving the club at the end of his contract.

=== Kitchee ===
On 1 July 2024, Haddow signed for Hong Kong Premier League club Kitchee.

On 7 August 2024, Haddow made his official club debut in the BOC Life Cup held at Hong Kong Stadium in a match against Atlético Madrid.

On 22 March 2025, Haddow scored his first professional goal against Eastern in the Hong Kong Sapling Cup.

== International career ==
Born in Hong Kong to a Scottish father and Japanese mother, Haddow is eligible to represent Japan, Hong Kong, England and Scotland at international level.

In May 2022, Haddow was called up to the Japan national under-19 team for the first time ahead of the 2022 Maurice Revello Tournament. Haddow made his Japan U19 debut against Comoros U21 coming on as a substitute in the 55th minute.

In September 2024, Haddow applied for a HKSAR passport. On 25 July 2025, it was announced that Haddow had acquired his HKSAR passport, making him eligible to represent Hong Kong internationally.

In September 2025, Haddow was named in the Hong Kong U-22 squad for the 2026 AFC U-23 Asian Cup qualifiers.

In May 2026, Haddow was called up to the Hong Kong senior squad for the international friendly matches in June against Mongolia and Cambodia.

On 9 June 2026, Haddow made his international debut for Hong Kong in a friendly match against Cambodia.

== Personal life ==
Haddow grew up in Discovery Bay, Hong Kong and was educated at Discovery College as a primary school student. He then spent a year at Island School before moving to the United Kingdom.

== Career Statistics ==
=== International ===
As of 9 June 2026

National team	Year	Apps	Goals
Hong Kong	2026	1	0
Total		1	0

== Honours ==
Kitchee

- Hong Kong Premier League: 2025–26
