= Roger Riera =

Spanish footballer (born 1995)

Personal information
- Full name: Roger Riera Canadell
- Date of birth: 17 February 1995 (age 31)
- Place of birth: El Masnou, Spain
- Height: 1.86 m (6 ft 1 in)
- Position: Centre back

Team information
- Current team: Kitchee
- Number: 3

Youth career
- 2005–2014: Barcelona
- 2014–2016: Nottingham Forest

Senior career*
Years	Team	Apps	(Gls)
2016–2017	Celta B	51	(0)
2017–2019	Villarreal B	63	(0)
2019–2021	NAC Breda	43	(4)
2021	Barcelona B	13	(0)
2021–2022	Andorra	19	(0)
2022–2023	Hércules	30	(5)
2023–2024	Real Unión	7	(0)
2024–2025	Atlético Sanluqueño	31	(0)
2025–	Kitchee	20	(1)
- * Club domestic league appearances and goals as of 19 October 2026

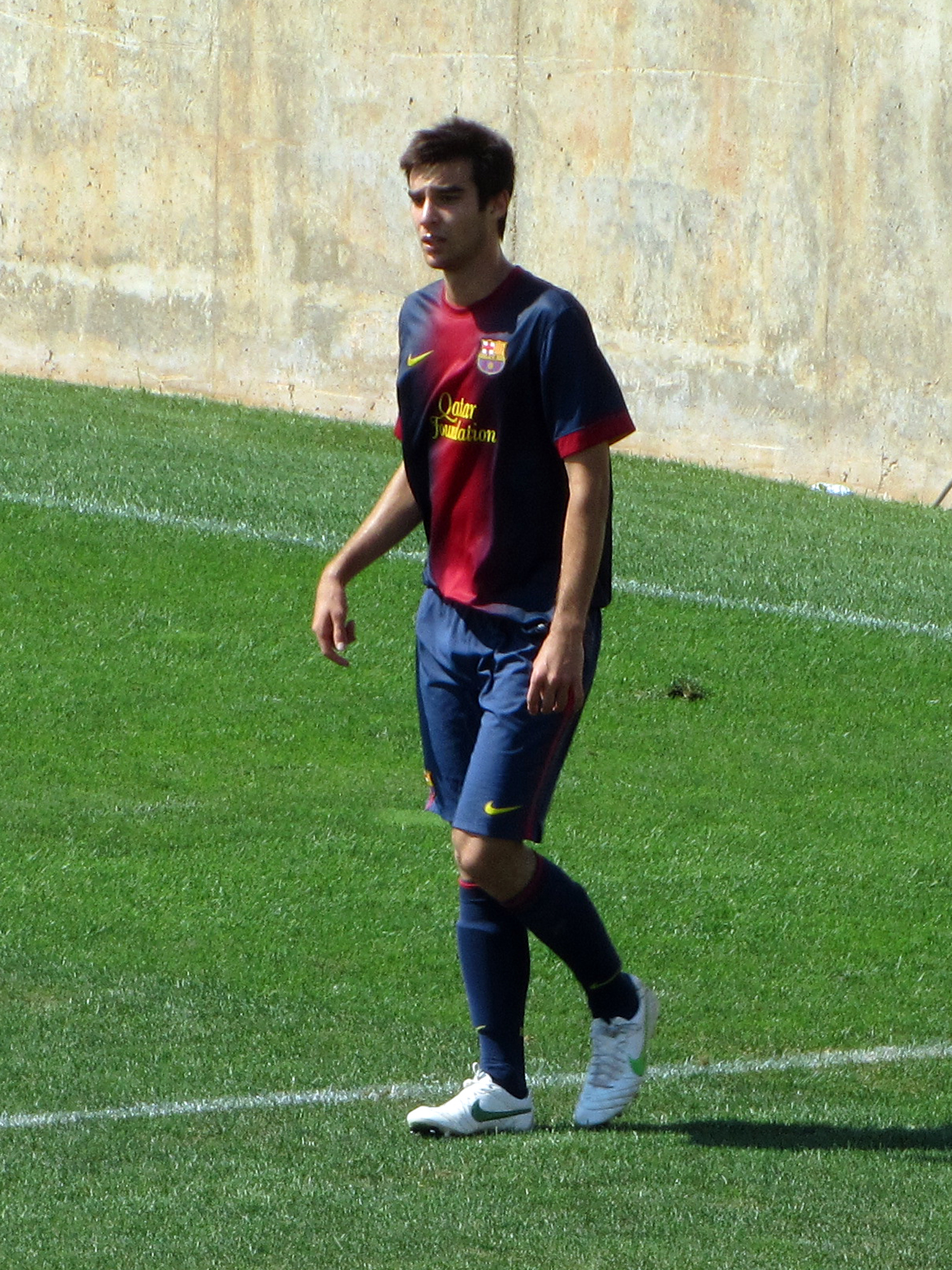
Roger Riera in a 2012–13 FC Barcelona kit

Roger Riera Canadell (born 17 February 1995) is a Spanish professional footballer who currently plays as a centre back for Hong Kong Premier League club Kitchee.

== Club career ==
Born in El Masnou, Barcelona, Catalonia, Riera joined FC Barcelona's La Masia youth system in 2005. He was named captain all every youth level at the club. He was the captain of the under-19 side that won the first UEFA Youth League competition in 2014. On 15 July 2014, he signed with English club Nottingham Forest on a two-year contract and was subsequently assigned to the youth team. After failing to break into the first team, his contract was terminated in January 2016.

On 21 January 2016, Riera joined the reserve team of Celta de Vigo on a four-and-a-half-year deal. After one season, he moved to Villarreal B on 30 June 2017.

On 27 June 2019, Riera moved abroad and joined Dutch Eerste Divisie side NAC Breda on a two-year contract. On 28 January 2021, he returned to Barça and was assigned to the reserves in Segunda División B.

On 20 July 2021, Riera signed with FC Andorra after the expiration of his contract with Barcelona. He was a backup option during the season, as the side achieved a first-ever promotion to Segunda División, but terminated his contract on 1 September 2022.

On 6 September 2022, Riera joined Segunda Federación club Hércules on a one-year deal with an option for another year.

On 30 August 2024, Riera signed with Atlético Sanluqueño in the third tier.

On 16 July 2025, Riera joined Hong Kong Premier League club Kitchee.

== Honours ==
Barcelona Youth

- UEFA Youth League: 2013–14

Kitchee

- Hong Kong Premier League: 2025–26
