= Matheus Dantas =

Brazilian footballer

Personal information
- Full name: Matheus de Jesus Dantas
- Date of birth: 5 September 1998 (age 28)
- Place of birth: Campo Grande, Brazil
- Height: 1.85 m (6 ft 1 in)
- Position: Centre back

Team information
- Current team: Sha Tin
- Number: 20

Youth career
- 2013–2014: São Paulo
- 2014–2018: Flamengo

Senior career*
Years	Team	Apps	(Gls)
2018–2020	Flamengo	1	(0)
2020–2021	Oeste	7	(0)
2021	Casa Pia	13	(0)
2021	Estrela da Amadora	9	(0)
2022–2023	PO Xylotymbou	24	(4)
2024	1. SC Znojmo	7	(1)
2024–2026	Kitchee	36	(2)
2026–	Sha Tin	4	(0)
- * Club domestic league appearances and goals as of 22 November 2026

Matheus de Jesus Dantas (born 5 September 1998) is a Brazilian professional footballer who currently plays as a centre back for Hong Kong Premier League club Sha Tin.

== Club career ==
=== Early career ===
Born in Mato Grosso do Sul, Dantas grew up supporting São Paulo and joined the club's youth team in 2013. In the following year, he switched to Flamengo. He broke his cruciate ligament in July 2016 and was ruled out of play for seven months. In 2017, he suffered a knee injury which also put him in the sidelines. Progressing through the youth teams, he went on to captain the under-20 team.

=== Flamengo ===
==== 2018 season ====
On 17 January 2018 Dantas made his first team debut coming on as a late substitute in a 2–0 win against Volta Redonda, in Campeonato Carioca. On 2 May, his contract was extended until 31 December 2019.

==== 2019 season ====
On 5 May 2019 Dantas played his first Campeonato Brasileiro Série A match at Estádio do Morumbi against São Paulo, he started the match as head coach Abel Braga fielded the whole team with reserves, the match ended 1–1.

=== Farense ===
On 21 July 2020 Farense signed Dantas from Flamengo on a free transfer. Although the transfer didn't happen as he failed in the medical exams.

=== Oeste ===
On 20 August 2020, Dantas signed on a free transfer with Oeste until December 2023.

=== Estrela ===
On 26 June 2021, Dantas signed a two-year contract with Liga Portugal 2 club Estrela da Amadora.

=== Kitchee ===
On 15 October 2024, Dantas joined Hong Kong Premier League club Kitchee.

=== Sha Tin ===
On 30 September 2026, Dantas joined another HKPL club Sha Tin.

== Career statistics ==
=== Club ===
As of 26 October 2020

Club	Season	League			Cup		Continental		Other		Total	
Club	Season	Division	Apps	Goals	Apps	Goals	Apps	Goals	Apps	Goals	Apps	Goals
Flamengo	2018	Série A	0	0	0	0	0	0	1 (Note: Appearance(s) in Campeonato Carioca.)	0	1	0
Flamengo	2019	Série A	1	0	0	0	0	0	1	0	2	0
Flamengo	2020	Série A	0	0	0	0	0	0	3	0	3	0
Flamengo	Total		1	0	0	0	0	0	5	0	6	0
Oeste	2020	Série B	7	0	–		–		–		7	0
Career total			8	0	0	0	0	0	5	0	13	0

== Honours ==
Flamengo

- Copa Libertadores: 2019
- Recopa Sudamericana: 2020
- Campeonato Brasileiro Série A: 2019
- Supercopa do Brasil: 2020
- Campeonato Carioca: 2019, 2020

Kitchee

- Hong Kong Premier League: 2025–26
