= Aarón Rey =

Spanish footballer (born 1998)

Personal information
- Full name: Aarón Rey Sánchez
- Date of birth: 19 May 1998 (age 28)
- Place of birth: Ferrol, Spain
- Height: 1.73 m (5 ft 8 in)
- Positions: Attacking midfielder; winger

Team information
- Current team: Kitchee
- Number: 24

Youth career
- –2015: Galicia Caranza
- 2015–2016: Racing Ferrol
- 2016–2017: Celta

Senior career*
Years	Team	Apps	(Gls)
2016	Racing Ferrol	1	(0)
2017–2019	Celta B	32	(0)
2019–2022	Sabadell	85	(2)
2022–2023	Gimnàstic	34	(2)
2023–2024	Cultural Leonesa	33	(0)
2024–2025	Kitchee	21	(6)
2025–2026	Bellinzona	30	(4)
2026–	Kitchee	1	(0)
- * Club domestic league appearances and goals as of 21 November 2026

Aarón Rey Sánchez (born 19 May 1998) is a Spanish professional footballer who currently plays as an attacking midfielder for Hong Kong Premier League club Kitchee.

== Club career ==
Born in Ferrol, A Coruña, Galicia, Rey joined Racing de Ferrol's youth setup in 2015, from SCDR Galicia de Caranza. On 3 April 2016, aged just 17, he made his first team debut by playing the last 15 minutes of a 0–0 Segunda División B home draw against CD Tudelano.

On 10 July 2016, Rey joined RC Celta de Vigo and returned to the youth setup. Promoted to the reserves for the 2017–18 season, he was sparingly used before signing for CE Sabadell FC on 25 July 2019; with the latter side, he achieved promotion to Segunda División in 2020.

Rey made his professional debut on 27 September 2020, starting in a 0–1 away loss against RCD Mallorca. He was mainly used as a substitute during the campaign, as his side suffered relegation.

On 20 July 2022, Rey signed a two-year contract with Primera Federación side Gimnàstic de Tarragona. Despite featuring regularly, he terminated his link with the club on 26 June 2023.

On 3 August 2024, Rey joined Hong Kong Premier League club Kitchee.

On 2 November 2026, Rey rejoined Kitchee.

== Career statistics ==
=== Club ===
As of 11 January 2025

Club	Season	League			National Cup		League Cup		Other		Total	
Club	Season	Division	Apps	Goals	Apps	Goals	Apps	Goals	Apps	Goals	Apps	Goals
Racing Ferrol	2015–16	Segunda División B	1	0	0	0	—		—		1	0
Celta B	2017–18	Segunda División B	20	0	0	0	—		2 (Note: Appearances in the Segunda División B play-offs)	0	22	0
Celta B	2018–19	Segunda División B	12	0	0	0	—		—		12	0
Celta B	Total		32	0	0	0	—		2	0	34	0
Sabadell	2019–20	Segunda División B	24	0	0	0	—		3	0	27	0
Sabadell	2020–21	Segunda División	25	0	2	0	—		—		27	0
Sabadell	2021–22	Primera División RFEF	36	2	1	0	—		—		37	2
Sabadell	Total		85	2	3	0	—		3	0	91	2
Gimnàstic	2022–23	Primera Federación	34	2	1	0	—		—		35	2
Cultural Leonesa	2023–24	Primera Federación	33	0	0	0	—		—		33	0
Kitchee	2024–25	Hong Kong Premier League	8	2	0	0	3 (Note: Appearances in the Hong Kong Sapling Cup)	1	2 (Note: Appearances in the Hong Kong Senior Challenge Shield)	0	13	3
Career total			193	6	4	0	3	1	7	0	207	7
