= Fynn Talley =

English footballer (born 2002)

Personal information
- Full name: Fynn Michael Cordell Talley
- Date of birth: 14 September 2002 (age 24)
- Height: 1.91 m (6 ft 3 in)
- Position: Goalkeeper

Team information
- Current team: Drogheda United
- Number: 44

Youth career
- Arsenal
- 2017–2020: Brighton & Hove Albion

Senior career*
Years	Team	Apps	(Gls)
2020–2023	Brighton & Hove Albion	0	(0)
2020	→ Burgess Hill Town (loan)	5	(0)
2022	→ Gosport Borough (loan)	15	(0)
2022	→ Cliftonville (loan)	1	(0)
2023–2024	Peterborough United	2	(0)
2024–2025	Kitchee	21	(0)
2026–	Drogheda United	15	(0)
- * Club domestic league appearances and goals as of 18:43, 10 November 2026 (UTC)

Fynn Michael Cordell Talley (born 14 September 2002) is an English professional footballer who plays as a goalkeeper for League of Ireland First Division club Drogheda United.

== Career ==
=== Early career ===
After playing youth football for Arsenal, Talley joined Brighton & Hove Albion in 2017. Talley moved on loan to Burgess Hill Town in January 2020, and turned professional with Brighton in July 2020.

He had further loans at Gosport Borough in February 2022, and Cliftonville in June 2022. He made his debut for Cliftonville in the Europa Conference League first qualifying round first leg fixture against DAC 1904. He returned to Brighton in January 2023, and was released by Brighton following the 2022–23 season.

=== Peterborough United ===
He signed for Peterborough United in July 2023. He appeared in the FA Cup for the club, saving crucial penalties in the shoot-out, before making his first Football League start on 1 January 2024 following an injury in the previous game to first-choice keeper Nicholas Bilokapic. He was released by Peterborough at the end of the 2023–24 season.

=== Kitchee ===
On 5 July 2024, Talley signed for Hong Kong Premier League club Kitchee.

=== Drogheda United ===
On 20 January 2026, Talley signed for League of Ireland Premier Division club Drogheda United. He made his debut on 17 April 2026 in a 3–1 defeat at home to St Patrick's Athletic. He made 17 appearances in all competitions in 2026, as the club was relegated following a 2–1 defeat to UCD in the Promotion/Relegation Playoff.

== Career statistics ==
As of match played 7 November 2026

Appearances and goals by club, season and competition
Club	Season	League			National Cup (Note: FA Cup]], Irish Cup, Hong Kong FA Cup & FAI Cup)		League Cup (Note: Includes EFL Cup, Alan Turvey Trophy & Hong Kong Senior Shield)		Continental		Other		Total	
Club	Season	Division	Apps	Goals	Apps	Goals	Apps	Goals	Apps	Goals	Apps	Goals	Apps	Goals
Brighton & Hove Albion U23	2019–20	—			–		—		—		0 (Note: Appearance(s) in the EFL Trophy)	0	0	0
Burgess Hill Town (loan)	2019–20	Isthmian League South East Division	5	0	—		2	0	—		—		7	0
Gosport Borough (loan)	2021–22	Isthmian League South East Division	15	0	—		—		—		2 (Note: Appearances in the Portsmouth Senior Cup)	0	17	0
Cliftonville (loan)	2022–23	NIFL Premiership	1	0	—		1	0	2 (Note: Appearances in the UEFA Europa Conference League)	0	1 (Note: Appearance in the Scottish Challenge Cup)	0	5	0
Peterborough United	2023–24	EFL League One	2	0	2	0	1	0	–		4	0	9	0
Kitchee	2024–25	EFL Championship	21	0	1	0	1	0	—		—		23	0
Drogheda United	2026	League of Ireland Premier Division	15	0	1	0	—		—		1 (Note: Appearance in the 2026 League of Ireland play-offs)	0	17	0
Career total			59	0	4	0	5	0	2	0	6	0	76	0
