= Bae Jae-woo =

South Korean footballer

Bae Jae-woo 배재우
Personal information
- Full name: Bae Jae-woo
- Date of birth: 17 May 1993 (age 33)
- Place of birth: South Korea
- Height: 1.74 m (5 ft 9 in)
- Position: Defender

Senior career*
Years	Team	Apps	(Gls)
2015–2018	Jeju United	37	(0)
2018–2021	Ulsan Hyundai	2	(0)
2019–2020	→ Sangju Sangmu (army)	17	(0)
2022	Seoul E-Land FC	10	(0)
2022	→ Bucheon FC 1995 (loan)	14	(0)
2023	Gimpo FC	10	(0)
2024–2025	Kitchee	17	(0)
- * Club domestic league appearances and goals as of 1 June 2025

Bae Jae-woo (Korean: 배재우; born 17 May 1993) is a South Korean professional footballer who plays as a defender.

== Club career ==
On 27 July 2024, Bae joined Hong Kong Premier League club Kitchee.
