= Matthew Slattery (footballer) =

Hong Kong professional footballer

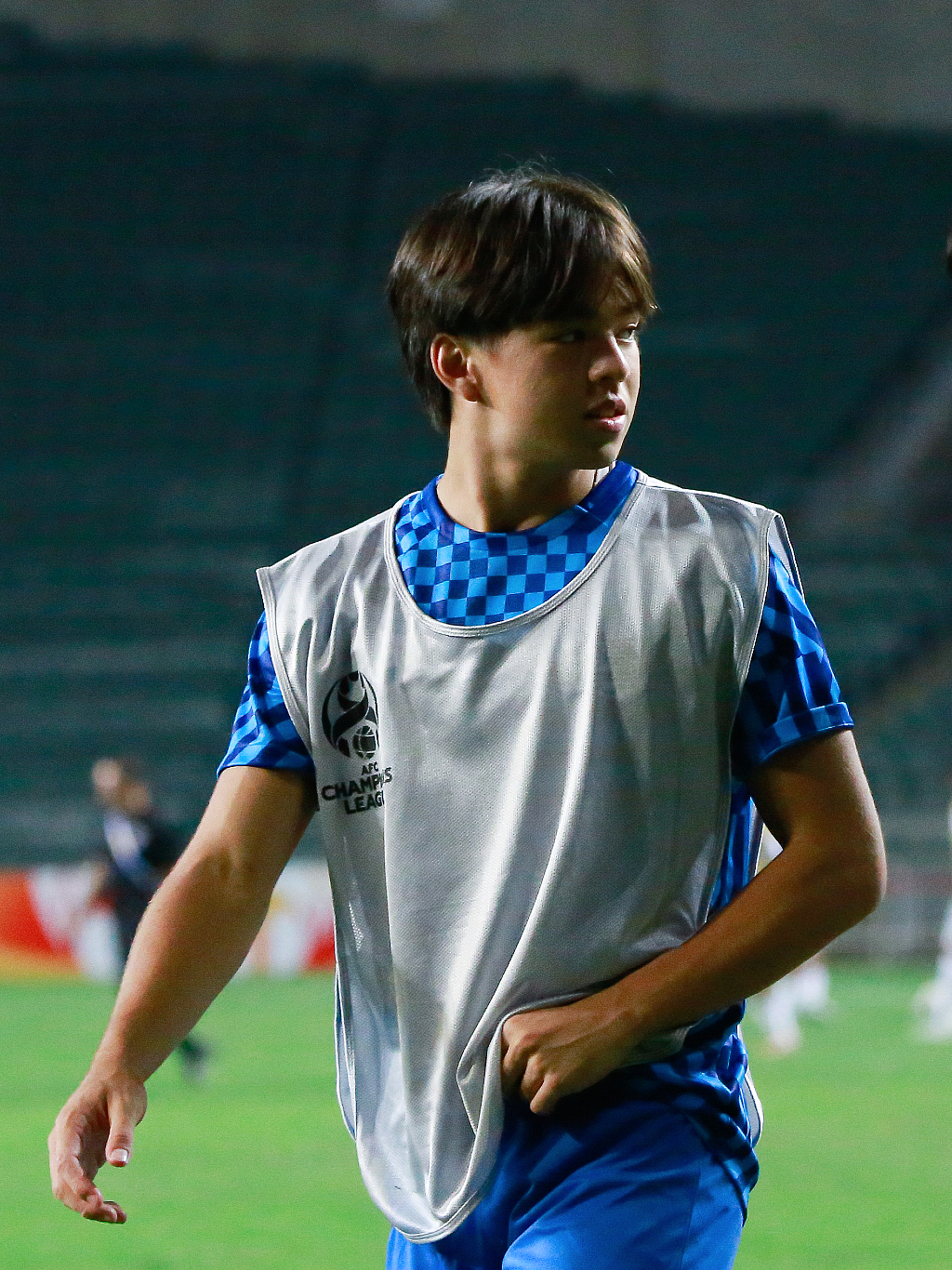
- Slattery in pre-match training for Kitchee vs LCS

Personal information
- Full name: Matthew Luke Slattery
- Date of birth: 5 April 2005 (age 21)
- Place of birth: Chai Wan, Hong Kong
- Height: 1.75 m (5 ft 9 in)
- Position: Forward

Team information
- Current team: Kowloon City
- Number: 18

Youth career
- –2023: Kitchee

Senior career*
Years	Team	Apps	(Gls)
2023–2026	Kitchee	7	(0)
2026–	Kowloon City	3	(0)

International career^{‡}
2019	Hong Kong U16	1	(1)
2022–2024	Hong Kong U20	6	(0)
2023–	Hong Kong U23	3	(1)
- * Club domestic league appearances and goals as of 8 November 2026 ‡ National team caps and goals as of 4 October 2023

Matthew Luke Slattery (Chinese: 馬斐; pinyin: Mǎ Fěi; born 5 April 2005) is a Hong Kong professional footballer who currently plays as a striker for Hong Kong Premier League club Kowloon City.

== Club career ==
=== Kitchee ===
Slattery was promoted to the senior squad of Kitchee ahead of the 2023–24 season following good performances in the Under-18's Youth Premier League. He was also rewarded with his first professional contract with the club and would don the number 96 in his debut season. On 1 August 2023, he made his first unofficial senior appearance as a substitute during the pre-season friendly against Chainat Hornbill with him expressing his will to continue to go on the grind and continue to improve following his lacklustre performance.

On 17 September 2023, Slattery was included in the travelling squad for the 2023–24 AFC Champions League campaign, marking his first professional away outing. On 30 September 2023, Slattery made his senior debut in the 6–2 thrashing of RCFC in the Sapling Cup as a substitute. On 30 January 2024, Slattery was selected for the 2024 Guangdong–Hong Kong Cup final squad following a good showing in the preliminary training.

On 30 June 2026, Slattery departed Kitchee after spending his whole football career from the youth ranks to the senior team.

On 14 August 2026, Slattery joined Kowloon City.

== International career ==
In June 2023, Slattery made his Hong Kong U-20 debut against Thailand in a friendly where he impressed for a good 90 minutes playing as a striker. He was then called up for the Hong Kong U-23 where he scored a goal against Tajikistan U-23 and stole a draw from the opponents late in the game.

In August 2023, Slattery participated in the 2023 East Asian Youth Games in Ulaanbaatar, where he managed to fend off Mongolia as he scored another late goal to secure the win for Hong Kong. However, the team fell to a 8–0 thrashing from Chinese Taipei and returned home with a silver medal.

In November 2024, Slattery earned his first senior team call up for the international friendlies against Philippines and Mauritius.

== Personal life ==
Slattery is an alumnus of La Salle College and was part of the school's athletics and football team. Slattery's girlfriend is current Kitchee player Letti Tsang.

== Career statistics ==
=== Club ===
As of 4 October 2023

Club	Season	League			FA Cup		League Cup		Others		Total	
Club	Season	Division	Apps	Goals	Apps	Goals	Apps	Goals	Apps	Goals	Apps	Goals
Kitchee	2023–24	Hong Kong Premier League	0	0	0 (Note: Appearances in the Hong Kong FA Cup)	0	1 (Note: Appearances in the Sapling Cup)	0	0 (Note: Appearances in the Senior Shield)	0	0	0
Career total			0	0	0	0	1	0	0	0	0	0

== Honour ==
Kitchee

- Hong Kong Senior Challenge Shield: 2023–24
- HKPLC Cup: 2023–24
