= Pong Cheuk Hei =

Hong Kong footballer (born 2004)

Personal information
- Full name: Pong Cheuk Hei
- Date of birth: 31 January 2004 (age 22)
- Place of birth: Pok Fu Lam, Hong Kong
- Height: 1.91 m (6 ft 3 in)
- Position: Goalkeeper

Team information
- Current team: Kitchee
- Number: 17

Youth career
- –2020: Eastern

Senior career*
Years	Team	Apps	(Gls)
2020–2024	Resources Capital	16	(0)
2021–2023	→ HK U23 (loan)	14	(0)
2024–2025	North District	23	(0)
2025–	Kitchee	21	(0)

International career^{‡}
2019	Hong Kong U-16	1	(0)
2022	Hong Kong U-19	3	(0)
2023–	Hong Kong U-22	2	(0)
2026–	Hong Kong	5	(0)
Medal record
Men's football
Representing Hong Kong
FIFA ASEAN Challenge Cup
Winner	2026 Hong Kong
- * Club domestic league appearances and goals as of 21 November 2026 ‡ National team caps and goals as of 3 October 2026

Pong Cheuk Hei (Chinese: 龐焯熙; born 31 January 2004) is a Hong Kong professional footballer who currently plays as a goalkeeper for Hong Kong Premier League club Kitchee and the Hong Kong national team.

== Club career ==
On 27 November 2020, Pong joined Resources Capital.

On 4 October 2021, Pong was loaned to HK U23.

On 8 August 2024, Pong joined North District.

On 7 July 2025, Pong joined Kitchee.

== International career ==
On 31 March 2026, Pong made his international debut for Hong Kong in the 2027 AFC Asian Cup qualification match against India.

== Career statistics ==
=== Club ===
As of 6 November 2021

Club	Season	League			National Cup		League Cup		Other		Total	
Club	Season	Division	Apps	Goals	Apps	Goals	Apps	Goals	Apps	Goals	Apps	Goals
Resources Capital	2020–21	Hong Kong Premier League	0	0	0	0	1 (Note: Appearances in the Sapling Cup)	0	0	0	1	0
Resources Capital	2021–22	Hong Kong Premier League	0	0	0	0	0	0	0	0	0	0
Resources Capital	Total		0	0	0	0	1	0	0	0	1	0
HK U23 (loan)	2021–22	Hong Kong Premier League	2	0	0	0	0	0	0	0	2	0
Career total			2	0	0	0	1	0	0	0	3	0

=== International ===
As of 3 October 2026

National team	Year	Apps	Goals
Hong Kong	2026	5	0
Total		5	0

== Honours ==
Kitchee

- Hong Kong Premier League: 2025–26

Hong Kong

- FIFA ASEAN Challenge Cup: 2026
