= Ken Ng =

Hong Kong football referee

- Chinese: 伍健
Transcriptions
Standard Mandarin
- Hanyu Pinyin: Wǔ Jiàn
- IPA: [ù tɕjɛ̂n]
Yue: Cantonese
- Jyutping: Ng5 Gin6
- IPA: [ŋ̬̍ kìːn]

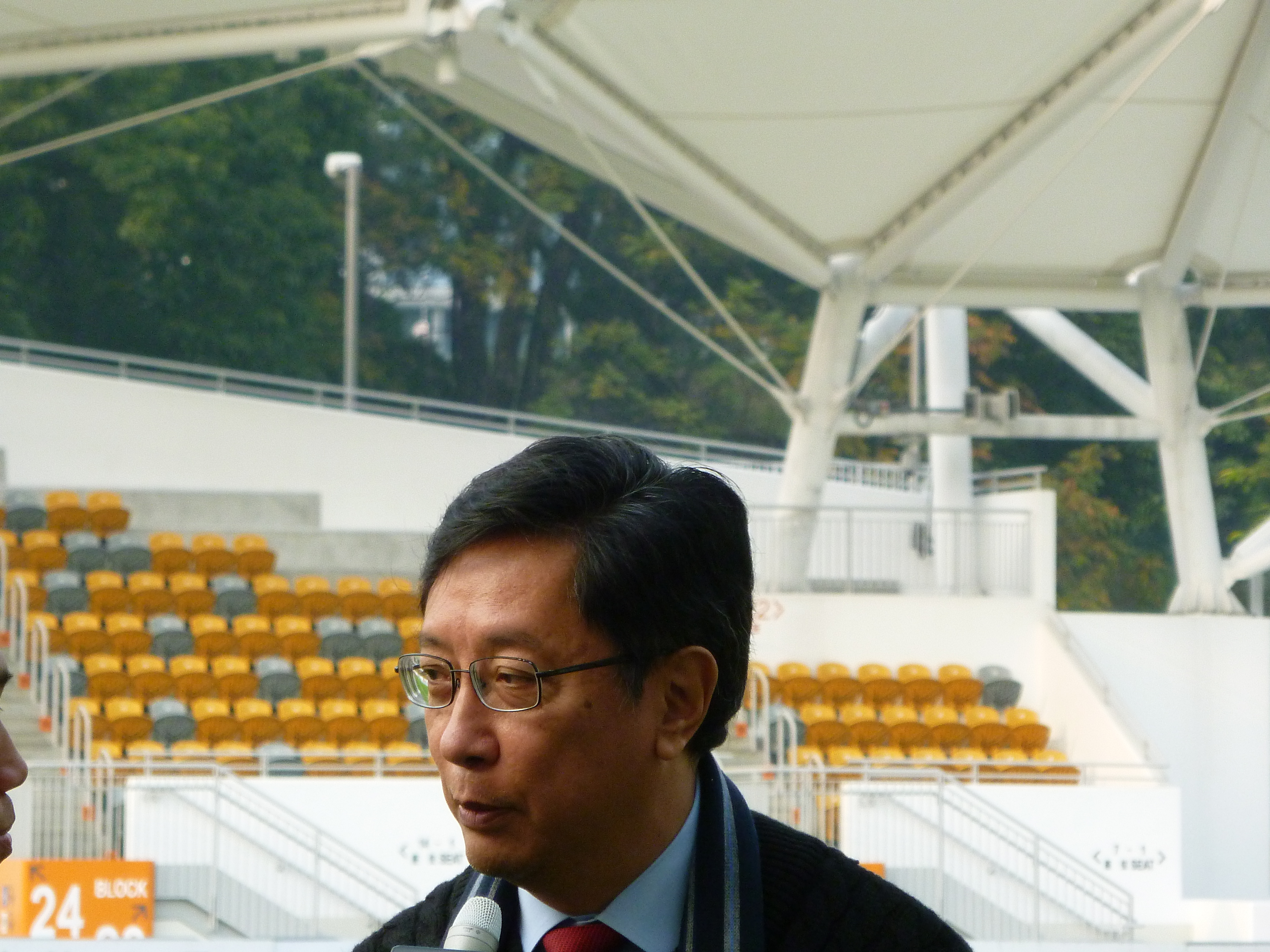

Ken Ng (Chinese: 伍健; Jyutping: Ng5 Gin6; Cantonese pronunciation: [ŋ̬̍ kìːn]; born 1 March 1951) is the president of Hong Kong Premier League club Kitchee. He is a former referee and a former member of the Hong Kong First Division board. Ng, along with Steven Lo, Chan Man Chun, and Chan Tin Yau, formed the preparation committee for the establishment of the Premier League.

Ng became the general manager of Kitchee in 2000, and under his stewardship the club was promoted to First Division in 2003.
