= 2025–26 Hong Kong Premier League =

12th season of the Hong Kong Premier League

Hong Kong Premier League
- Season: 2025–26
- Dates: 29 August 2025 – 17 May 2026
- Champions: Kitchee (7th title)
- AFC Champions League Two: Kitchee; Tai Po
- Matches: 110
- Goals: 362 (3.29 per match)
- Top goalscorer: Yu Okubo (18 goals)
- Biggest home win: Lee Man 8–1 Eastern (24 January 2026)
- Biggest away win: Kowloon City 0–5 Kitchee (2 November 2025)
- Highest scoring: Lee Man 8–1 Eastern (24 January 2026)
- Longest winning run: 13 matches Kitchee
- Longest unbeaten run: 18 matches Kitchee
- Longest winless run: 12 matches HKFC
- Longest losing run: 9 matches HKFC
- Highest attendance: 2,706; Eastern 0–1 Kitchee (29 August 2025)
- Lowest attendance: 178; Rangers 5–2 HKFC (25 January 2026)
- Total attendance: 81,774
- Average attendance: 743

The 2025–26 Hong Kong Premier League (also known as the BOC Life Hong Kong Premier League for sponsorship reasons) was the 12th season of the Hong Kong Premier League, the top division of Hong Kong football.

== Teams ==
A total of 10 teams compete in the league, including the top 9 teams from the previous season and 1 team promoted from the First Division League.

Eastern District will play in the Premier League for the first time in their history this season.

Club	Founded	Position 2024–25
Tai Po	2002	1st
Lee Man	2017	2nd
Eastern	1932	3rd
Kitchee	1931	4th
Southern	2002	5th
Kowloon City	2002	6th
Rangers	1958	7th
North District	2002	8th
HKFC	1886	9th
Eastern District	2002	8th in First Division

- Yellow denotes a newly promoted club entering the league this year.

=== Stadia and locations ===
Locations of the 2025–26 Hong Kong Premier League clubs

Primary venues used in the Hong Kong Premier League:

Eastern Kitchee Lee Man	Eastern District	HKFC	Kitchee	Kowloon City
Mong Kok Stadium	Siu Sai Wan Sports Ground	HKFC Stadium	Tseung Kwan O Sports Ground	Sham Shui Po Sports Ground
Capacity: 6,664	Capacity: 11,981	Capacity: 2,750	Capacity: 3,500	Capacity: 2,194
North District	Rangers	Southern	Tai Po	
North District Sports Ground	Tsing Yi Sports Ground	Aberdeen Sports Ground	Tai Po Sports Ground	
Capacity: 2,500	Capacity: 1,500	Capacity: 9,000	Capacity: 3,200	

=== Personnel and kits ===
Team	Chairman	Head Coach	Captain	Kit Manufacturer	Chest Sponsor					
Team	Chairman	Head Coach	Captain	Kit Manufacturer	Eastern	(Hong Kong) Cheng Kai Ming	(Spain) Manuel Torres	(Hong Kong) Leung Chun Pong	Adidas	Synagistics
Eastern District	(Hong Kong) Goldbert Chi Chiu	(Hong Kong) Ng Wai Chiu	(Hong Kong) Hélio	Kelme						
HKFC	(Hong Kong) Mark Grainger	(South Africa) Chancy Cooke	(Hong Kong) Cheng Chun Wang	Puma	The Executive Centre					
Kitchee	(Hong Kong) Ken Ng	(Spain) Iñigo Calderón	(Hong Kong) Tan Chun Lok	Nike	EDPS					
Kowloon City	(Hong Kong) Wong Siu Kei	(Hong Kong) Fung Hoi Man	(Hong Kong) Tsang Kam To	MC Sportswear	Resources Capital					
Lee Man	(Hong Kong) Norman Lee	(England) Darren Read (interim)	(Hong Kong) Ngan Lok Fung	Macron	Lee & Man Chemical					
North District	(Hong Kong) Chu Ho Yin	(Hong Kong) Chan Chi Hong	(Hong Kong) Lo Kong Wai (Colombia) Elian Villalobos (Note: "Chinese captain is Lo Kong Wai and vice-captain is Law Hiu Chung; Foreign captain is Elian Villalobos and vice-captain is Danilo Santos.")	Kelme	Golik					
Rangers	(Hong Kong) Peter Mok	(Hong Kong) Poon Man Tik	(Hong Kong) Lau Chi Lok	Kelme	EGL Tours					
Southern	(Hong Kong) Matthew Wong	(Hong Kong) Pui Ho Wang	(Japan) Shu Sasaki	Kelme	CRRC					
Tai Po	(Hong Kong) Lam Yick Kuen	(Hong Kong) Lee Chi Kin	(Brazil) Gabriel Cividini	Kelme	Tai Po Sports Association					

=== Managerial changes ===
Team	Outgoing manager	Manner of departure	Date of vacancy	Position in table	Incoming manager	Date of appointment
Lee Man	(Hong Kong) Chu Siu Kei (interim)	Appointed to permanent role				31 May 2025
Kitchee	(Portugal) Edgar Cardoso	End of contract	1 June 2025	Pre-season	(Spain) Iñigo Calderón	4 July 2025
Eastern District	(Spain) Raúl Coloma	Change of role	10 July 2025	Pre-season	(Hong Kong) Ng Wai Chiu	10 July 2025
Kowloon City	(Hong Kong) Chan Ming Kong	Change of role	4 August 2025	Pre-season	(Hong Kong) Yau Tsz Yeung	4 August 2025
Rangers	(Hong Kong) Wong Chin Hung	Change of role	22 August 2025	Pre-season	(Hong Kong) Poon Man Tik	22 August 2025
Kowloon City	(Hong Kong) Yau Tsz Yeung	Change of role	21 September 2025	6th	(Hong Kong) Chan Ming Kong	21 September 2025
Kowloon City	(Hong Kong) Chan Ming Kong	Mutual consent	7 November 2025	6th	(Hong Kong) Fung Hoi Man	17 November 2025
Eastern	(Hong Kong) Roberto Losada	Mutual consent	18 December 2025	8th	(Hong Kong) Cristiano Cordeiro (interim)	18 December 2025
Eastern	(Hong Kong) Cristiano Cordeiro (interim)	End of interim role	8 January 2026	8th	(Spain) Manuel Torres	8 January 2026
Lee Man	(Hong Kong) Chu Siu Kei	Sacked	8 March 2026	2nd	(England) Darren Read (interim)	8 March 2026

== League table ==
Pos	Team	Pld	W	D	L	GF	GA	GD	Pts	Qualification or relegation (Note: Teams play each other twice (18 matches), before the league is split into two groups (the top five and the bottom five).)
1	Kitchee (C)	22	16	4	2	54	28	+26	52	Qualification for AFC Champions League Two group stage
2	Tai Po	22	13	4	5	49	32	+17	43	Qualification for AFC Champions League Two group stage (Note: Tai Po qualified for the AFC Champions League Two group stage as the 2025–26 Hong Kong FA Cup winners.)
3	Lee Man	22	12	6	4	57	26	+31	42	
4	Eastern	22	9	5	8	39	37	+2	32 (Note: Head-to-head points: Eastern 6, North District 3)	
5	North District	22	8	8	6	43	39	+4	32	
6	Kowloon City	22	8	4	10	28	39	−11	28	
7	Southern	22	7	4	11	28	35	−7	25	
8	Eastern District	22	5	6	11	20	22	−2	21 (Note: Head-to-head points: Eastern District 7, Rangers 1)	
9	Rangers	22	6	3	13	26	44	−18	21	
10	HKFC	22	3	2	17	18	60	−42	11	

Source: Hong Kong Football Association
Rules for classification: 1) Points; 2) Head-to-head points; 3) Head-to-head goal difference; 4) Head-to-head goals scored; 5) Goal difference; 6) Goals scored; 7) Fair-play points; 8) Drawing lots (Play-off if the winner has to be decided).
(C) Champions

== Results ==
=== Home and away ===
Home \ Away	EAS	EDS	HKF	KIT	KLC	LEE	NOR	RAN	SOU	TPF
Eastern	—	1–0	5–0	0–1	2–1	1–1	1–4	1–1	3–1	1–2
Eastern District	1–0	—	3–0	0–1	0–1	0–0	0–2	4–0	0–1	1–3
HKFC	0–4	0–2	—	1–2	0–1	0–4	0–3	0–2	0–1	2–2
Kitchee	2–1	1–0	5–2	—	4–0	1–0	3–3	2–0	3–0	4–2
Kowloon City	2–1	0–0	1–2	0–5	—	1–4	2–2	5–1	2–1	0–2
Lee Man	8–1	1–0	7–1	2–3	0–0	—	2–2	2–0	1–0	2–2
North District	0–3	2–2	2–1	1–2	2–1	3–3	—	2–1	2–1	1–1
Rangers	1–1	0–1	5–2	0–3	2–3	1–2	2–1	—	1–0	0–2
Southern	1–1	1–1	2–1	2–4	2–0	0–3	2–2	1–2	—	2–1
Tai Po	3–1	1–0	2–0	1–1	3–2	3–5	0–2	6–1	1–0	—

Source: HKFA
Legend: Blue = home team win; Yellow = draw; Red = away team win.

=== Split ===
After 18 matches, the league splits into two groups of five teams. The top five are grouped into the Championship Group and the bottom five into the Challenging Group, with the teams playing every other team in their group once (either at home or away). The exact matches are determined by the position of the teams in the league table at the time of the split. All matches are played at neutral venues.

==== Championship Group ====
Home \ Away	KIT	LEE	NOR	TPF	EAS
Kitchee	—	1–4	—	—	4–4
Lee Man	—	—	—	2–3	0–1
North District	2–2	2–4	—	—	—
Tai Po	3–0	—	3–2	—	—
Eastern	—	—	3–1	2–4	—

Source: HKFA
Legend: Blue = home team win; Yellow = draw; Red = away team win.

==== Challenging Group ====
Home \ Away	KLC	EDS	SOU	RAN	HKF
Kowloon City	—	2–1	—	—	1–1
Eastern District	—	—	—	1–1	1–2
Southern	3–1	2–2	—	—	—
Rangers	1–2	—	3–1	—	—
HKFC	—	—	1–4	2–1	—

Source: HKFA
Legend: Blue = home team win; Yellow = draw; Red = away team win.

== Results by match played ==
Win
Draw
Lose

Team ╲ Match	1	2	3	4	5	6	7	8	9	10	11	12	13	14	15	16	17	18	19	20	21	22
Eastern	L	W	D	D	L	L	W	L	W	W	L	L	W	D	W	L	D	W	W	W	L	D
Eastern District	D	L	W	L	D	L	W	W	L	L	L	W	L	W	D	L	D	L	L	L	D	D
HKFC	L	L	L	L	L	W	L	L	D	L	L	L	L	L	L	L	L	L	W	L	W	D
Kitchee	W	W	W	D	D	W	W	W	W	W	W	W	W	W	W	W	W	W	L	D	L	D
Kowloon City	D	L	L	W	D	L	W	L	L	W	W	L	L	L	W	L	D	W	W	L	W	D
Lee Man	D	W	L	W	W	D	W	W	W	W	W	L	D	W	W	D	D	D	W	L	W	L
North District	W	W	L	W	D	D	W	D	D	L	W	W	W	L	D	W	D	D	L	D	L	L
Rangers	W	W	W	L	D	L	L	L	L	W	L	W	L	L	L	L	D	L	W	L	L	D
Southern	L	L	D	W	D	L	W	L	L	W	L	L	L	W	W	L	D	L	L	W	W	D
Tai Po	D	L	W	D	W	W	W	D	D	L	W	L	L	W	L	W	W	W	W	W	W	W

Source: Hong Kong Football Association website

== Season statistics ==
=== Top scorers ===
Rank	Player	Club	Goals
1	(Japan) Yu Okubo	Eastern	18
2	(Brazil) Samuel Granada	North District	16
3	(Hong Kong) Everton Camargo	Lee Man	15
4	(Brazil) Luizinho	Kowloon City	12
4	(Hong Kong) Stefan Pereira	Southern	12
6	(Spain) Marcos Gondra	Eastern	11
7	(Spain) Noah Baffoe	Lee Man	10
7	(Spain) Leandro Martínez	Kitchee	10
7	(Spain) Adrián Revilla	Kitchee	10
7	(Ghana) Nassam Ibrahim	Rangers	10

=== Hat-tricks ===
Note: The results column shows the scorer's team score first. Teams in bold are home teams.

#	Player	For	Against	Result	Date	Ref
1	(Hong Kong) Everton Camargo	**Lee Man**	HKFC	7–1	1 November 2025	
2	(Hong Kong) Juninho	Kitchee	**Kowloon City**	5–0	2 November 2025	
3	(Spain) Noah Baffoe	Lee Man	**Tai Po**	5–3	17 January 2026	
4	(Hong Kong) Everton Camargo	**Lee Man**	Eastern	8–1	24 January 2026	
5	(Ghana) Nassam Ibrahim	**Rangers**	HKFC	5–2	25 January 2026	
6	(Brazil) Luizinho	**Kowloon City**	Rangers	5–1	1 March 2026	
7	(Hong Kong) Stefan Pereira	Southern	HKFC	4–1	3 May 2026	
8	(Japan) Yu Okubo	Eastern	Kitchee	4–4	17 May 2026	

=== Clean sheets ===
Rank	Player	Club	Matches
1	(Hong Kong) Chan Ka Ho	Lee Man	7
1	(Hong Kong) Paulo César	Eastern District	7
3	(Hong Kong) Pong Cheuk Hei	Kitchee	6
4	(Hong Kong) Lo Siu Kei	Tai Po	4
4	(Hong Kong) Yuen Ho Chun	Kowloon City	4
6	(Hong Kong) Ng Wai Him	Southern	3
6	(Hong Kong) Wang Zhenpeng	Kitchee	3
8	(Spain) Gianni Cassaro	Eastern	2
8	(Hong Kong) Ko Chun	Eastern	2
8	(Hong Kong) Li Hon Ho	North District	2
8	(Hong Kong) Tse Ka Wing	Tai Po	2

== Attendances ==
Pos	Team	Total	High	Low	Average	Change
1	Lee Man	10,410	2,559	493	1,157	+101.6%
2	Kitchee	10,324	2,374	500	1,147	+21.2%
3	Eastern District	9,359	2,623	348	1,040	n/a^{1}
4	Eastern	8,749	2,706	454	972	−5.7%
5	Tai Po	7,546	1,270	445	838	−31.8%
6	HKFC	6,052	1,160	375	672	+8.6%
7	Kowloon City	4,667	1,142	220	519	−3.2%
8	North District	4,656	950	298	517	+35.7%
9	Rangers	3,673	568	178	408	−4.9%
10	Southern	3,580	556	292	398	−6.1%
N/A	Neutral venue	12,758	1,198	233	638	n/a
	League total	81,774	2,706	178	743	+8.5%

Source: HKFA
Notes:
1: Team did not play in the Premier League last season
