= 2023–24 Kitchee SC season =

Kitchee 2023–24 season
- President: Ken Ng
- Head Coach: Chu Chi Kwong
- Stadium: Mong Kok Stadium
Home colours	Away colours

The 2023–24 season is Kitchee's 42nd season in the top-tier division in Hong Kong football. Kitchee has competed in the Premier League, Senior Challenge Shield, FA Cup, Sapling Cup and AFC Champions League this season.

== Squad ==
=== First team ===
As of 9 January 2024

Squad No.	Name	Nationality	Date of birth (age)	Previous club	Contract since	Contract end
Goalkeepers
1	Wang Zhenpeng	(Hong Kong) (China)	5 May 1984 (age 42)	(China) Dalian Shide	2005	2024
13	Ainikaer Maihemuti ^{FP}	(China)	3 January 2002 (age 24)	(China) Xinjiang Tianshan Leopard	2023	2024
86	Paulo César	(Hong Kong) (Brazil)	27 March 1986 (age 40)	(Hong Kong) Tai Po	2018	2024
Defenders
2	Law Tsz Chun	(Hong Kong)	2 March 1997 (age 29)	Youth Team	2008	2024
5	Hélio	(Hong Kong) (Brazil)	31 January 1986 (age 40)	(Hong Kong) Citizen	2014	2024
11	Ibrahim Kurban ^{FP}	(China)	28 February 2001 (age 25)	(China) Xinjiang Tianshan Leopard	2023	2024
15	Roberto	(Hong Kong) (Brazil)	28 May 1983 (age 43)	(China) R&F (Hong Kong)	2021	2024
26	Andy Russell	(Hong Kong) (England)	21 November 1987 (age 38)	(China) Sichuan Jiuniu	2023	2024
33	Sedin Ramić ^{FP}	(Bosnia and Herzegovina)	28 November 2000 (age 25)	(Bosnia and Herzegovina) Radnik Hadžići	2024	2024
77	Fernando	(Hong Kong) (Brazil)	14 November 1986 (age 39)	(Hong Kong) Eastern	2022	2024
Midfielders
4	Charlie Scott ^{FP}	(England)	2 September 1997 (age 29)	(Hong Kong) Happy Valley	2021	2024
10	Cleiton ^{FP}	(Brazil)	9 December 1986 (age 39)	(Hong Kong) Yuen Long	2019	2024
16	Tan Chun Lok	(Hong Kong)	15 January 1996 (age 30)	(China) R&F (Hong Kong)	2023	2024
17	Mikael ^{FP}	(Brazil)	6 April 1993 (age 33)	(Hong Kong) Eastern	2022	2024
19	Huang Yang	(Hong Kong) (China)	19 October 1983 (age 42)	(China) Shanghai Shenhua	2011	2024
28	Cheng Chin Lung	(Hong Kong)	7 January 1998 (age 28)	Youth Team	2008	2024
Strikers
7	Ruslan Mingazow ^{FP}	(Turkmenistan)	23 November 1991 (age 34)	(Kazakhstan) FC Caspiy	2022	2024
8	Igor Sartori ^{FP}	(Brazil)	8 January 1993 (age 33)	(Japan) Ventforet Kofu	2023	2024
9	Kim Shin-wook ^{FP}	(South Korea)	14 April 1988 (age 38)	(Singapore) Lion City Sailors	2023	2025
27	Sherzod Temirov ^{FP}	(Uzbekistan)	27 October 1998 (age 27)	(Iran) Paykan	2023	2024
67	Seb Buddle	(Hong Kong) (England)	27 July 1999 (age 27)	(Hong Kong) Southern	2016	2024
89	Jakob Jantscher ^{FP}	(Austria)	8 January 1989 (age 37)	(Austria) SK Sturm Graz	2022	2024
90	Juninho	(Hong Kong) (Brazil)	11 December 1990 (age 35)	(Hong Kong) Rangers	2023	2024
99	Poon Pui Hin	(Hong Kong)	3 October 2000 (age 25)	(Hong Kong) Happy Valley	2021	2024
Players who left during mid-season
3	Aleksandar Damchevski ^{FP}	(North Macedonia)	21 November 1992 (age 33)	(Albania) KF Bylis	2023	2023
12	Ogenyi Onazi ^{FP}	(Nigeria)	25 December 1992 (age 33)	(Bahrain) East Riffa	2023	2023
18	Oliver Gerbig	(Hong Kong) (Germany)	12 December 1998 (age 27)	(United States) Virginia Cavaliers	2022	2024
Players who left on loan
	Ngan Cheuk Pan	(Hong Kong)	22 January 1998 (age 28)	(Hong Kong) Sham Shui Po	2023	2023
	Chang Kwong Yin	(Hong Kong)	24 February 2002 (age 24)	(Hong Kong) Sham Shui Po	2023	2023
	Yim Kai Cheuk	(Hong Kong)	4 December 2004 (age 21)	(Hong Kong) HK U23	2023	2023
	Jordon Brown	(Hong Kong) (England)	10 February 1994 (age 32)	(Hong Kong) HK U23	2023	2023
	Chen Ngo Hin	(Hong Kong)	27 February 2003 (age 23)	(Hong Kong) Southern	2023	2023
	Sohgo Ichikawa	(Hong Kong) (Japan)	30 July 2004 (age 22)	(Hong Kong) Southern	2023	2023

Remarks:
^{FP} These players are registered as foreign players.

=== U22 Team ===
As of 28 August 2023

Squad No.	Name	Nationality	Date of birth (age)	Previous club	Contract since	Contract end
Goalkeepers
91	Tuscany Shek	(Hong Kong)	25 December 2007 (age 18)	Youth Team	2023	2024
Defenders
74	Jason Kam Chi Kin	(Hong Kong)	6 March 2004 (age 22)	Youth Team	2022	2024
	Wong Yat Long	(Hong Kong)	31 July 2008 (age 18)	Youth Team	2023	2024
Midfielders
32	Yuen Chun Him	(Hong Kong)	7 January 2006 (age 20)	Youth Team	2022	2024
87	Yu Ching-Wai	(Hong Kong)	25 September 2007 (age 18)	Youth Team	2023	2024
95	Shinichi Chan	(Hong Kong) (Japan)	5 September 2002 (age 24)	(Hong Kong) Resources Capital	2018	2024
Strikers
70	Yeung Cheuk Kwan	(Hong Kong)	1 December 2006 (age 19)	Youth Team	2023	2024
78	Pang Hing Hei	(Hong Kong)	6 March 2007 (age 19)	Youth Team	2023	2024
79	Lau Yu Ho	(Hong Kong)	12 January 2006 (age 20)	Youth Team	2023	2024
96	Matthew Slattery	(Hong Kong) (England)	5 April 2005 (age 21)	Youth Team	2023	2024

== Transfers ==
=== Transfers in ===
Pre-Season

Position	Player	Transferred from	Ref
DF	(North Macedonia) Aleksandar Damchevski	(Albania) KF Bylis	Free
DF	(China) Ibrahim Kurban	(China) Xinjiang Tianshan Leopard	Free
DF	(Hong Kong) (Japan) Shinichi Chan	(Spain) Real Unión	Loan Return
MF	(Nigeria) Ogenyi Onazi	(Bahrain) East Riffa	Free
MF	(Hong Kong) Juninho	(Hong Kong) Rangers	Free
FW	(Hong Kong) Tan Chun Lok	(China) Guangzhou City	Free
FW	(Austria) Jakob Jantscher	(Austria) SK Sturm Graz	Free

Mid-Season

Position	Player	Transferred from	Ref
FW	(Uzbekistan) Sherzod Temirov	(Iran) Paykan	Free
DF	(Bosnia and Herzegovina) Sedin Ramic	(Bosnia and Herzegovina) Radnik Hadžići	Free
DF	(Hong Kong) (England) Seb Buddle	(Hong Kong) Southern	Loan Return

=== Transfers out ===
Preseason

Position	Player	Transferred To	Ref
FW	(Hong Kong) (Nigeria) Alex Akande	(China) Shanghai Jiading Huilong	Free
DF	(Hong Kong) (Brazil) Tomas Maronesi	(Hong Kong) Southern	Free
DF	(Kyrgyzstan) Bekzhan Sagynbayev	(Kyrgyzstan) Dordoi Bishkek	Free
DF	(Hong Kong) (France) Clement Benhaddouche	(China) Heilongjiang Ice City	Free
DF	(Hong Kong) Ellison Tsang Yi Hang	(Hong Kong) HK U23	Free
MF	(Hong Kong) Marcus Dai Tsz-Hin	(Hong Kong) North District	Free
MF	(Hong Kong) Ho Chun Ting	(Hong Kong) North District	Free
MF	(Hong Kong) Tsang Chun Hin	(Hong Kong) Resources Capital	Free
MF	(Hong Kong) Yung Ho	(Hong Kong) Southern	Free
MF	(Hong Kong) (Togo) Kong Maddox	Hong Kong FC	Free
FW	(Montenegro) Dejan Damjanović	Retired	N.A.

Mid-season

Position	Player	Transferred To	Team	Ref
MF	(Nigeria) Ogenyi Onazi	(Italy) Avezzano (I4)	Free	
DF	(North Macedonia) Aleksandar Damchevski	(Italy) Avezzano (I4)	Free	
DF	(Hong Kong) (Germany) Oliver Gerbig	(China) Henan F.C.	Free	

=== Loans Out ===
Position	Player	Transferred To	Ref
DF	(Hong Kong) Ngan Cheuk Pan	(Hong Kong) Sham Shui Po	Season loan
DF	(Hong Kong) Chang Kwong Yin	(Hong Kong) Sham Shui Po	Season loan
DF	(Hong Kong) Yim Kai Cheuk	(Hong Kong) HK U23	Season loan
DF	(Hong Kong) (England) Jordon Brown	(Hong Kong) HKFC	Season loan
MF	(Hong Kong) Chen Ngo Hin	(Hong Kong) Southern	Season loan
MF	(Hong Kong) (Japan) Sohgo Ichikawa	(Hong Kong) Southern	Season loan
FW	(Hong Kong) (England) Seb Buddle	(Hong Kong) Southern	Season loan

== Club officials ==
=== Club Senior staff ===
Position	Name
President	(Hong Kong) Ken Ng
General Manager	(Australia) (Hong Kong) Wilson Ng
Licensing and Public Relations Manager	(Canada) (Hong Kong) Ng Yee Yun
Director of Marketing	(Hong Kong) Lo Shuk Ting
Director of Football	(Hong Kong) Chu Chi Kwong
Director of Youth Training Development	(Hong Kong) Chu Chi Kwong
Technical Director of Football Academy	(South Korea) Kim Dong-jin
Competition Manager	(Hong Kong) Chiu Yun Shing
Customer Service Manager	(Hong Kong) Cheng Ching Yu

=== Coaching staff ===
Position	Name
Head coach	(South Korea) Kim Dong-jin (Interim)
Assistant head coach	(Portugal) Edgar Cardoso (Hong Kong) Poon Man Chun
First-Team assistant coach	(Hong Kong) (China) Huang Yang
First-Team assistant coach	(Hong Kong) (Brazil) Roberto
Goalkeeping coach	(Hong Kong) Guo Jianqiao
Head Physical Coach & Head of Data Analysis	(South Korea) Yoon Dong-hun
Tactical Analyst	(Hong Kong) Ng Wing Chung
Tactical Analyst	(Spain) Manuel Crespo Carabaña
Team Assistant	(Hong Kong)
Men U18 Youth Team coach	(South Korea) Yoon Dong-hun, (Hong Kong) Gao Wen
Men U16 Youth Team coach	
Men U14 Youth Team coach	(South Korea) Kim Dong-jin
Women Team Head coach	(Hong Kong) Cheung Po Chun
Women U18 Youth Team coach	(Hong Kong) Cheung Po Chun
Women U15 Youth Team coach	(Hong Kong) Cheung Wai Ki
Kitchee Academy Director	(Hong Kong) Chu Chi Kwong
Kitchee Academy coach	(Hong Kong) Gao Wen
Kitchee Director of Elite Youth	(Portugal) Edgar Cardoso
Professional Footballer Preparatory Programme coach	(Hong Kong) Chu Chi Kwong
Club Consultant Doctor	(Hong Kong) Dr. Yung Shu Hang
Club Consultant Dietitian	(Hong Kong) Sylvia Lam

== Team statistics ==
=== Appearances and goals ===
As of 26 May 2024

No.	Pos.	Player	HKPL		FA Cup		Sapling Cup		Challenge Shield		AFC Champions League		Total	
No.	Pos.	Player	Apps.	Goals	Apps.	Goals	Apps.	Goals	Apps.	Goals	Apps.	Goals	Apps.	Goals
1	GK	(Hong Kong) (China) Wang Zhenpeng	9+1	0	1+1	0	2	0	1	0	2	0	17	0
2	DF	(Hong Kong) Law Tsz Chun	13+2	0	2	0	1	0	1+1	0	5+1	0	26	0
4	MF	(Hong Kong) (England) Charlie Scott	13+1	3	1+1	0	7+1	0	3	1	4	0	31	4
5	DF	(Hong Kong) (Brazil) Hélio	13+1	0	2	0	2+3	0	3	0	5+1	0	30	0
7	FW	(Turkmenistan) Ruslan Mingazow	8+2	4	1	0	1+1	0	3	2	4	0	20	6
8	FW	(Brazil) Igor Sartori	11+4	3	0+1	0	4	1	1	0	2+1	0	24	4
9	FW	(South Korea) Kim Shin-wook	1	3	0	0	1+2	0	0+1	2	0+2	0	7	5
10	MF	(Brazil) Cleiton	12+2	4	2	0	6	2	3	0	6	0	31	6
11	DF	(China) Ibrahim Kurban	3	0	0	0	5+1	0	0	0	0+1	0	10	0
15	DF	(Hong Kong) (Brazil) Roberto	8+3	0	1+1	1	4+4	0	2	0	3+1	0	27	1
16	MF	(Hong Kong) Tan Chun Lok	7+11	2	2	0	4	2	0+3	0	2+2	0	31	4
17	MF	(Brazil) Mikael	14+2	16	1+1	1	6+1	7	3	0	5	1	33	25
18	DF	(Hong Kong) (Germany) Oliver Gerbig	7	1	0	0	1	0	1+1	0	3+2	0	15	1
19	MF	(Hong Kong) (China) Huang Yang	2+8	0	0+1	0	4+1	0	0	0	0+2	0	18	0
26	DF	(Hong Kong) (England) Andy Russell	12+2	1	1	0	7+1	3	2+1	1	4+1	0	32	5
27	FW	(Uzbekistan) Sherzod Temirov	9+4	5	1+1	1	3+4	2	0	0	0	0	22	8
28	MF	(Hong Kong) Cheng Chin Lung	2+12	0	1	0	5+1	2	0+1	0	0+3	0	25	2
32	MF	(Hong Kong) Yuen Chun Him	0	0	0	0	8+1	2	0	0	0	0	9	2
33	DF	(Serbia) Sedin Ramić	5+2	0	0+1	0	3+1	0	0	0	0	0	12	0
67	FW	(Hong Kong) (England) Seb Buddle	0+2	1	0	0	0	0	0	0	0	0	2	0
70	FW	(Hong Kong) Yeung Cheuk Kwan	0	0	0	0	0+7	1	0	0	0	0	7	1
74	DF	(Hong Kong) Jason Kam Chi Kin	0	0	0	0	4+2	0	0	0	0	0	6	0
77	DF	(Hong Kong) (Brazil) Fernando	5+4	3	0+1	0	5	0	1+2	0	4+2	1	24	4
78	FW	(Hong Kong) Pang Hing Hei	0	0	0	0	0+2	0	0	0	0	0	2	0
79	FW	(Hong Kong) Lau Yu Ho	0	0	0	0	0+2	0	0	0	0	0	2	0
86	GK	(Hong Kong) (Brazil) Paulo César	7	0	1	0	0	0	2	0	4	0	14	0
87	FW	(Hong Kong) Yu Ching-Wai	0	0	0	0	0+1	0	0	0	0	0	1	0
89	FW	(Austria) Jakob Jantscher	9+2	2	1	0	4+4	4	3	1	5+1	4	29	11
90	FW	(Hong Kong) (Brazil) Juninho	12+4	8	2	0	4+1	3	1+1	2	1+1	0	27	13
91	GK	(Hong Kong) Tuscany Shek	1	0	0	0	8	0	0	0	0	0	9	0
95	MF	(Hong Kong) (Japan) Shinichi Chan	13+4	1	1+1	0	3	0	2	0	4+2	0	30	1
96	FW	(Hong Kong) (England) Matthew Slattery	0+1	0	0	0	8+1	0	0	0	0	0	10	0
99	FW	(Hong Kong) Poon Pui Hin	6+11	1	1	0	1	0	1+2	1	1+1	0	24	2
Players who have played this season but had left the club or on loan to other club
3	DF	(North Macedonia) Aleksandar Damchevski	2	0	0	0	0	0	0	0	0	0	2	0
12	MF	(Nigeria) Ogenyi Onazi	3	0	0	0	0	0	0	0	2	0	5	0

== Friendlies ==
Win Draw Loss

Thailand Pre-season Tour

28 July 2023 1	Buriram United (Thailand)	3–2	(Hong Kong) Kitchee SC	Buriram
	Lonsana Doumbouya 83'; Supachai Chaided	Report	Juninho 13'; Mikael 47'	Stadium: Chang Arena

30 July 2023 2	Bangkok United (Thailand)	3–2	(Hong Kong) Kitchee SC	Pathum Thani, Thailand
		Report	Kim Shin-wook; Mikael	Stadium: Thammasat Stadium

1 August 2023 3	Chainat Hornbill (Thailand)	2–3	(Hong Kong) Kitchee SC	Chai Nat, Thailand
	45'; 62'	Report	Oliver Gerbig 35', 65'; Juninho 70'	Stadium: Khao Plong Stadium

2 August 2023 4	Uthai Thani F.C. (Thailand)	3–2	(Hong Kong) Kitchee SC	Uthai Thani, Thailand
	54'; 64'; 72'	Report	Mikael 28' (pen.); Juninho 56'	Stadium: Uthai Thani Province Stadium

6 August 2023 5	Trat F.C. (Thailand)	1–1	(Hong Kong) Kitchee SC	Trat, Thailand
	54'; 64'; 72'	Report	Mikael 28' (pen.); Juninho 56'	Stadium: Trat Province Stadium

== Competitions ==
=== Overview ===
==== League Results summary ====
Overall								Home						Away					
Pld	W	D	L	GF	GA	GD	Pts	W	D	L	GF	GA	GD	W	D	L	GF	GA	GD
4	3	0	1	14	4	+10	9	3	0	0	13	0	+13	0	0	1	1	4	−3

Last updated: 25 August 2023.
Source: Competitive Matches

=== Hong Kong Premier League ===
==== League Matches ====
19 August 2023 1	Kitchee	3–0	Tai Po	Mong Kok, Kowloon
16:00 (UTC+8)	Juninho 32', 74'; Mikael 71' (pen.)	Report		Stadium: Mong Kok Stadium; Attendance: 1,434; Referee: Tam Ping Wun

27 August 2023 2	Kitchee	8–0	HKFC	Mong Kok, Kowloon
16:00 (UTC+8)	Kim Shin-wook 14' 21' 24' (pen.); Tan Chun Lok 16'; Ruslan Mingazow 27'; Mikael 30'; Igor Sartori 55'; Jordon Brown 72' (o.g.)	Report		Stadium: Mong Kok Stadium; Attendance: 975; Referee: Luk Kin Sun

1 May 2024 3 (Rescheduled)	Eastern	2–1	Kitchee	Mong Kok, Kowloon
16:00 (UTC+8)	Tamirlan Kozubaev 24'; Noah Baffoe 86'	Report	Sherzod Temirov 45+3'	Stadium: Mong Kok Stadium; Referee: Liu Kwok-man

16 September 2023 4	Lee Man	4–1	Kitchee	Tseung Kwan, New Territories
15:00 (UTC+8)	Henri Anier 27' 51' (pen.); Everton Camargo 44'; Paulinho Simionato 90+8'	Report	Juninho 42'	Stadium: Tseung Kwan O Sports Ground; Attendance: 2,108; Referee: Liu Fong-hei

24 September 2023 5	Kitchee	2–0	Rangers	Mong Kok, Kowloon
16:00 (UTC+8)	Charlie Scott 7'; Jakob Jantscher 62'	Report		Stadium: Mong Kok Stadium; Attendance: 1,308; Referee: Tam Ping-wun

28 April 2024 6 (Rescheduled)	HK U23	0–6	Kitchee	Diamond Hill, Kowloon
16:00 (UTC+8)		Report	Mikael 18', 22', 45+2'; Juninho 31'; Temirov 75'; Shinichi Chan 75'	Stadium: Hammer Hill Road Sports Ground; Attendance: 235; Referee: Luk Kin Sun

29 October 2023 7	Kitchee	5–1	Sham Shui Po	Mong Kok, Kowloon
16:00 (UTC+8)	Mikael 57', 60', 80'; Scott 64'; Poon Pui Hin 82'	Report	Dunga 90'	Stadium: Mong Kok Stadium; Attendance: 603; Referee: Luk Kin Sun

24 November 2023 8	Kitchee	0–0	Southern	Mong Kok, Kowloon
16:00 (UTC+8)		Report		Stadium: Mong Kok Stadium; Attendance: 1,109; Referee: Wong Wai Lun

3 December 2023 9	North District	2–3	Kitchee	Sheung Shui, New Territories
16:00 (UTC+8)	Jordan Lam 83'; Kendy 86'	Report	Fernando 12'; Temirov 16'; Mikael 44'	Stadium: North District Sports Ground; Attendance: 1,377; Referee: Luk Kin San

8 December 2023 10	Kitchee	5–1	Resources Capital	Mong Kok, Kowloon
16:00 (UTC+8)	Fernando 14'; Mikael 17', 88'; Sherzod Temirov 30'; Oliver Gerbig 71'	Report	Ho Sze Chit 76'	Stadium: Mong Kok Stadium; Referee: Law Bik Chi

17 February 2024 11	Rangers	0–1	Kitchee	Mong Kok, Kowloon
16:00 (UTC+8)		Report	Tan Chun Lok 34'	Stadium: Mong Kok Stadium; Attendance: 1,128; Referee: Wong Wai Lun

3 March 2024 12	Hong Kong Football Club	1–3	Kitchee	Happy Valley, Hong Kong Island
16:00 (UTC+8)	Leo 31'	Report	Mikael 29' (pen.); Ruslan Mingazow 45+6'; Juninho 66'	Stadium: Hong Kong Football Club Stadium; Attendance: 700; Referee: Wong Wai-lun

17 March 2024 13	Sham Shui Po	0–3	Kitchee	Cheung Sha Wan, New Kowloon
16:00 (UTC+8)		Report	Mingazov 28', 48'; Mikael 59' (pen.)	Stadium: Sham Shui Po Sports Ground; Attendance: 739; Referee: Ho Wai Sing

31 March 2024 14	Resources Capital	1–4	Kitchee	Tsing Yi, Hong Kong Island
16:00 (UTC+8)	Lee Yoon-kwon 28'	Report	Sherzod Temirov 5'; Cleiton 17'; Andy Russell 21'; Chan Ka Ho 84' (o.g.)	Stadium: Tsing Yi Sports Ground; Attendance: 377; Referee: Poon Chun Kit

6 April 2024 15	Kitchee	0–0	Eastern	Mong Kok, Kowloon
16:00 (UTC+8)		Report		Stadium: Mong Kok Stadium; Attendance: 1,807; Referee: Ho Wai-sing

14 April 2024 16	Kitchee	4–0	North District	Mong Kok, Kowloon
16:00 (UTC+8)	Jakob Jantscher 18'; Juninho 45+2', 84'; Mikael 70'	Report		Stadium: Mong Kok Stadium; Attendance: 758; Referee: Tam Ping-wun

20 April 2024 17	Tai Po	0–0	Kitchee	Tai Po, New Territories
16:00 (UTC+8)		Report		Stadium: Tai Po Sports Ground; Attendance: 1,481; Referee: Yu Kin-fung

25 February 2024 18 (Rescheduled)	Kitchee	6–0	HK U23	Mong Kok, Kowloon
16:00 (UTC+8)	Cleiton 25', 39' (pen.); Juninho 44'; Sartori 60', 63'; Buddle 90'	Report		Stadium: Mong Kok Stadium; Attendance: 474; Referee: Law Bik Chi

18 May 2024 19	Southern	0–3	Kitchee	Aberdeen, Hong Kong Island
16:00 (UTC+8)			Fernando 3'; Charlie Scott 69'; Cleiton 70'	Stadium: Aberdeen Sports Ground; Referee: Yu Kin-fung

26 May 2024 20	Kitchee	2–3	Lee Man	Mong Kok, Kowloon
16:00 (UTC+8)	Mikael 68', 70'	Report	Henri Anier 32', 42'; Ryoya Tachibana 40'	Stadium: Mong Kok Stadium; Attendance: 2,310; Referee: Lau Fong-hei

==== Table ====
Pos	Team	Pld	W	D	L	GF	GA	GD	Pts	Qualification or relegation
2	Tai Po	20	14	4	2	41	12	+29	46 (Note: Tai Po are ahead of Eastern on head-to-head points: Tai Po 6, Eastern 0)	
3	Eastern	20	14	4	2	47	11	+36	46	Qualification for AFC Champions League Two group stage (Note: Eastern qualified for the AFC Champions League Two group stage as the 2023–24 Hong Kong FA Cup winners)
4	Kitchee	20	14	3	3	60	15	+45	45	
5	Southern	20	10	4	6	38	18	+20	34	
6	Rangers	20	8	0	12	41	34	+7	24	

Updated to match(es) played on unknown. Source: Hong Kong Football Association
Rules for classification: 1) Points; 2) Head-to-head points; 3) Head-to-head goal difference; 4) Head-to-head goals scored; 5) Goal difference; 6) Goals scored; 7) Fair-play points; 8) Drawing lots (Play-off if the winner has to be decided).

=== AFC Champions League ===
Win Draw Loss

==== Group stage ====
Pos	Team	Pld	W	D	L	GF	GA	GD	Pts	Qualification	UTD	JBH	LCS	KIT
1	(Thailand) Bangkok United	6	4	1	1	11	8	+3	13	Advance to round of 16	—	3–2	1–0	1–1
2	(South Korea) Jeonbuk Hyundai Motors	6	4	0	2	12	9	+3	12	Advance to round of 16	3–2	—	3–0	2–1
3	(Singapore) Lion City Sailors	6	2	0	4	5	9	−4	6		1–2	2–0	—	0–2
4	(Hong Kong) Kitchee	6	1	1	4	7	9	−2	4		1–2	1–2	1–2	—

Source: AFC
Rules for classification: Tiebreakers

20 September 2023 1	Jeonbuk Hyundai Motors (South Korea)	2–1	(Hong Kong) Kitchee	Jeonju, South Korea
19:00 KST	Hong Jeong-ho 6', (yellow card) 69'; Han Kyo-won 61'	Report	Cleiton (yellow card) 36'; Mikael 56'; Gerbig (yellow card) 58'	Stadium: Jeonju World Cup Stadium; Attendance: 2,931; Referee: Mooud Bonyadifar (Iran)

4 October 2023 2	Kitchee (Hong Kong)	1–2	(Singapore) Lion City Sailors	Hong Kong
	Jakob Jantscher 87'; Tan Chun Lok (yellow card) 76'	Report	Richairo Zivkovic 14' (yellow card) 16'; Maxime Lestienne 36' (pen.); Hariss Harun (yellow card) 41'; Anumanthan Kumar (yellow card) 63'; Manuel Herrera López (yellow card) 90+5'	Stadium: Hong Kong Stadium; Referee: Yoshimi Yamashita (Japan)

25 October 2023 3	Kitchee (Hong Kong)	1–2	(Thailand) Bangkok United	Hong Kong
	Jakob Jantscher 7'; Tan Chun Lok (yellow card) 45+1'; Law Tsz Chun (yellow card) 90+4'		Rungrath Poomchantuek 45+4'; Willen 52' (pen.); Thitiphan Puangchan (yellow card) 18'; Suphan Thongsong (yellow card) 36'; Bassel Jradi (red card) 84'; Mahmoud Eid (yellow card) 90+4'; Chayawat Srinawong (yellow card) 90+9'	Stadium: Hong Kong Stadium; Attendance: 2,259; Referee: Majed Alshamrani (Saudi Arabia)

8 November 2023 4	Bangkok United (Thailand)	1–1	(Hong Kong) Kitchee	Rangsit, Thailand
	Willen 27'; Everton (yellow card) 60'; Mahmoud (penalty missed) 65; Nitipong Selanon (yellow card) 90+4'		Jakob Jantscher 70'; Mikael (yellow card) 62'; Poon Pui Hin (red card) 72'; Andy Russell (yellow card) 81'	Stadium: Thammasat Stadium; Referee: Ahmed Issa (United Arab Emirates)

29 November 2023 5	Kitchee (Hong Kong)	1–2	(South Korea) Jeonbuk Hyundai Motors	Hong Kong
	Jakob Jantscher 69'; Shinichi Chan (yellow card) 11'; Law Tsz Chun (yellow card) 17'; Mikael (yellow card) 90+5'	Report	Moon Seon-Min 2'; Song Min-kyu 38'; Lee Dong-jun (yellow card) 15'; Jeong Tae-wook (red card) 45'; Kim Jeong-hoon (yellow card) 83'	Stadium: Hong Kong Stadium; Referee: Akhrol Risqullaev (Uzbekistan)

13 December 2023 6	Lion City Sailors (Singapore)	0–2	(Hong Kong) Kitchee	Kallang, Singapore
		Report	Christopher van Huizen 11' (o.g.); Fernando 74'; Tan Chun Lok (yellow card) 69'	Stadium: Jalan Besar Stadium; Referee: Ahmed Issa (United Arab Emirates)

=== Hong Kong Sapling Cup ===
==== Group stage ====
Pos	Team	Pld	W	D	L	GF	GA	GD	Pts	Qualification
1	Kitchee	8	5	1	2	26	14	+12	16	Advance to Semi-finals
2	Rangers	8	4	3	1	22	18	+4	15	Advance to Semi-finals
3	North District	8	4	2	2	15	12	+3	14	
4	Resources Capital	8	1	2	5	10	24	−14	5 (Note: Head-to-head points: Resources Capital 4, Lee Man 1.)	
5	Lee Man	8	1	2	5	12	17	−5	5	

Updated to match(es) played on 24 March 2024. Source: HKFA
Rules for classification: 1) Points; 2) Head-to-head points; 3) Head-to-head goal difference; 4) Goal difference; 5) Goals scored.
Notes:

30 September 2023 SP01	Kitchee	6–2	Resources Capital	Mong Kok Stadium
15:00	Juninho 8'; Mikael 31', 40' (pen.), 41' (yellow card) 13'; Tan Chun Lok 45+3'; Jakob Jantscher 87'; Law Tsz Chun (yellow card) 58'	Report	Lui Cheuk Kan 62'; Ki Sze Ho 64'; Lui Cheuk Kan (yellow card) 38'	Attendance: 602; Referee: Liu Kwok Man

14 October 2023 SP02	Kitchee	2–3	Rangers	Siu Sai Wan Sports Ground
18:00	Mikael 44', 74'	Report	Lau Chi Lok 12'; Kim Min-kyu 57' (pen.); Kanda 79'	Attendance: 486; Referee: Wong Wai Lun

18 November 2023 SP03	Lee Man	2–3	Kitchee	Tseung Kwan O Sports Ground
15:00	Mikael 44', 74'	Report	Lau Chi Lok 12'; Kim Min-kyu 57' (pen.); Kanda 79'	Attendance: 486; Referee: Wong Wai Lun

23 December 2023 SP04	Rangers	4–4	Kitchee	Mong Kok Stadium
15:00	Leung Hoi Chun 13'; Ibrahim 26' (pen.); Chiu Ching Yu 90+2'; Kanda 90+3'	Report	Yuen Chun Him 10', 70'; Cheng Chin Lung 49'; Yueng Cheuk Kwan 83'	Attendance: 638; Referee: Liu Kwok Man

13 January 2024 SP05	Resources Capital	0–5	Kitchee	Kowloon Bay Park
15:00		Report	Russell 23'; Jantscher 35', 43'; Temirov 88'; Mikael 90+3'	Attendance: 268; Referee: Luk Kin Sun

20 January 2024 SP06	Kitchee	1–3	North District	Kowloon Bay Park
15:00	Russell 42'	Report	Matheus 8'; Kendy 81', 90+3'	Attendance: 293; Referee: Tam Ping Wun

21 February 2024 SP07 (Rescheduled)	North District	0–1	Kitchee	Hammer Hill Road Sports Ground
15:00		Report	Juninho 63'	Attendance: 423; Referee: Luk Kin Sun

24 March 2024 SP08	Kitchee	3–1	Lee Man	Mong Kok Stadium
15:00	Temirov 3'; Cleiton 45+1'; Sartori 49'	Report	Cheng Siu Kwan 90'	Attendance: 1,015; Referee: Yu Kin Fung

10 April 2024 Semi final	Kitchee	4–3	Tai Po	Mong Kok Stadium
20:00	Cheng Chin Lung 33'; Mikael 45+3' (pen.); Juninho 61'; Tan Chun Lok 90+8'	Report	Lucas Silva 11', 90'; Michel Renner 45+4'	Attendance: 1,153; Referee: Wong Wai Lun

15 May 2024 Final	Kitchee	0–1	Rangers	Mong Kok Stadium
18:00		Report	Nassam Ibrahim 40'	Attendance: 3,769; Referee: Liu Kwok-man

=== Hong Kong FA Cup ===
9 March 2024 Quarter Final	Kitchee	2–0	HKFC	Mong Kok
15:00	Roberto Júnior 5'; Sherzod Temirov 82'	Report		Stadium: Mong Kok Stadium; Attendance: 463; Referee: Poon Chun-kit

12 May 2024 Semi Final	Eastern	2–1	Kitchee	Mong Kok
15:00	Baffoe 18', 78'	Report	Mikael 76'	Stadium: Mong Kok Stadium; Attendance: 1,395; Referee: Tam Ping Wun

=== Hong Kong Senior Challenge Shield ===
4 November 2023 Quarter Final	Kitchee	7–0	Resources Capital	Tai Po Sports Ground
15:00	Mingazov 1'; Jantscher 5'; Poon Pui Hin 8'; Hui Chak Wai 23' (o.g.); Russell 44'; Kim Shin-wook 55', 87'	Report	Hui Chak Wai (yellow card) 54'; Tsang Chun Hin (yellow card) 90'	Attendance: 387; Referee: Poon Chun Kit

12 November 2023 Semi Final	Kitchee	1–0	Lee Man	Mong Kok Stadium
15:00	Juninho 18'; Cleiton (yellow card) 13'; Ruslan Mingazov (yellow card) 19'; Paulo César (yellow card) 35' Hélio (yellow card) 71' Roberto Júnior (yellow card) 85'	Report	Wong Chun Ho (yellow card) 27'; José Ángel (yellow card) 45'; Henri Anier (yellow card) 75'; Mitchel Paulissen (yellow card) 82'; Wu Chun Ming (yellow card) 86'; Gil (yellow card) 90'	Attendance: 2,360; Referee: Liu Kwok Man

10 February 2024 Final	Kitchee	2–1 (a.e.t.)	Eastern	Mong Kok Stadium
15:00	Scott 90+6' (pen.); Mingazow 118' (yellow card) 118'; Igor Sartori (yellow card) 34'; Hélio (yellow card) 54' (yellow-red card) 76'; Mikael (yellow card) 76'; Roberto (yellow card) 79'; Juninho (yellow card) 80'; Oliver Gerbig (yellow card) 116'	Report	Leung Kwun Chung 85' (pen.); Marcos Gondra (yellow card) 33'; Daniel Almazan (yellow card) 45+1'; Leon Jones (yellow card) 77'; Tamirlan Kozubayev (yellow card) 35' (yellow-red card) 90+3'; Wong Ho Chun (yellow card) 105'; Noah Baffoe (yellow card) 45+3' (red card) 108'	Attendance: 4,570; Referee: Tam Ping Wun
