= 2025–26 Eastern SC season =

2025–26 season
- Chairman: Cheng Kai Ming
- Head Coach: Roberto Losada
- Stadium: Mong Kok Stadium
Home colours	Away colours

The 2025–26 season is Eastern's 70th season in the top-tier division in Hong Kong football. Eastern will compete in the 2025–26 Hong Kong Premier League, Senior Challenge Shield, FA Cup, Sapling Cup and AFC Champions League Two this season.

== Squad ==
=== First team ===
As of 9 January 2024

Squad No.	Name	Nationality	Date of birth (age)	Previous club	Contract since	Contract end
Goalkeepers
1	Yapp Hung Fai	(Hong Kong)	21 March 1990 (age 36)	(Hong Kong) South China AA	2014	2026
25	Wilson Ko Chun	(Hong Kong)	17 February 1998 (age 28)	(Hong Kong) Lee Man	2025	2026
26	Liu Fu Yuen	(Hong Kong)	21 August 1990 (age 36)	(Hong Kong) Wong Tai Sin DRSC	2018	2026
	Gianni Cassaro	(Spain) (Italy)	10 April 1992 (age 34)	(Spain) Sabadell (S4)	2026	2026
Defenders
2	Calum Hall ^{FP}	(Scotland)	3 August 2000 (age 26)	(Scotland) Gala Fairydean Rovers (S5)	2023	2026
5	Marco Lorenz ^{FP}	(New Zealand) (England)	17 October 2005 (age 20)	(New Zealand) Auckland United (N1)	2025	2026
19	Yiu Ho Ming	(Hong Kong)	1 May 1995 (age 31)	Hong Kong Rangers	2025	2026
20	Ku Ja-ryong	(South Korea)	6 April 1992 (age 34)	(South Korea) Bucheon FC 1995 (K2)	2025	2026
21	Daniel Almazan ^{FP}	(Spain)	27 May 1999 (age 27)	(Puerto Rico) Bayamón Fútbol Club (P1)	2023	2026
22	Leung Kwun Chung	(Hong Kong)	1 April 1992 (age 34)	(Hong Kong) Tai Po	2019	2026
30	Wong Tsz Ho	(Hong Kong)	7 March 1994 (age 32)	Hong Kong Rangers	2014	2026
Midfielders
8	Jorge Carreón Negrete ^{FP}	(Bolivia)	17 October 1997 (age 28)	(Spain) UE Cornellà (S5)	2025	2026
14	Yu Joy Yin	(Hong Kong)	8 October 2001 (age 24)	(China) Shijiazhuang Gongfu	2026	2026
15	Lau Kwan-Ching	(Hong Kong)	15 May 2002 (age 24)	(Hong Kong) North District FC	2025	2026
16	Leung Chun Pong	(Hong Kong)	1 October 1986 (age 40)	(Hong Kong) South China AA	2016	2026
27	Marcos Gondra ^{FP}	(Spain)	1 January 1987 (age 39)	(Spain) CF Lorca Deportiva (S5)	2021	2026
32	Lam Hin Ting	(Hong Kong)	9 December 1999 (age 26)	Hong Kong Rangers	2024	2026
Strikers
7	Taiga Kawano	(Japan)	22 March 1999 (age 27)	(Australia) Northern Tigers (A3)	2025	2026
9	Yu Okubo	(Japan)	17 May 1997 (age 29)	(Australia) NWS Spirit (A2)	2025	2026
10	Manolo Bleda	(Hong Kong) (Spain)	31 July 1990 (age 36)	(Hong Kong) Lee Man	2025	2026
11	Felipe Sá ^{FP}	(Brazil)	29 May 1995 (age 31)	(United Arab Emirates) Fujairah FC (U2)	2024	2026
37	Chang Kwong Yin	(Hong Kong)	24 February 2002 (age 24)	Hong Kong Rangers	2025	2026
91	Gil	(Brazil)	13 April 1991 (age 35)	(Thailand) Chanthaburi (T2)	2025	2026
Players out on loan
Players left during mid-season

Remarks:
^{FP} These players are registered as foreign players.

=== U22 ===
As of 10 June 2024

Squad No.	Name	Nationality	Date of birth (age)	Previous club	Contract since	Contract end
Goalkeepers
40	Chung Hoi Man	(Hong Kong)	2 January 2003 (age 23)	Youth Team	2021	2025
77	Hung Hei Yin Ansley	(Hong Kong)	6 January 2010 (age 16)	Youth Team	2024	2025
80	Mak Ka-Lun	(Hong Kong)	19 January 2006 (age 20)	Youth Team	2023	2025
	Tam Chi-To	(Hong Kong)	7 January 2007 (age 19)	(Hong Kong) Yuen Long Youth	2023	2025
Defenders
43	Uriel Contiero	(Hong Kong) (Italy)	7 November 2009 (age 16)	Youth Team	2023	2025
88	Cheung Man Ho	(Hong Kong)	15 April 2006 (age 20)	Youth Team	2023	2025
	Tsang Cheuk-Yin	(Hong Kong)	26 April 2006 (age 20)	Youth Team	2023	2025
	Takumi Ng	(Hong Kong)	20 November 2007 (age 18)	Youth Team	2023	2025
	Tsang Tak-Hin	(Hong Kong)	31 August 2007 (age 19)	Youth Team	2023	2025
	Cheung Cheuk-Nam	(Hong Kong)	29 June 2007 (age 19)	Hong Kong Rangers Youth	2024	2025
Midfielders
18	Che Hope Cheung	(Hong Kong)	26 April 2010 (age 16)	Youth Team	2025	2026
28	Siu Ching	(Hong Kong)	28 April 2008 (age 18)	Youth Team	2023	2025
42	Yeung Tung Ki	(Hong Kong)	18 September 2006 (age 20)	Youth Team	2022	2025
44	Prabhat Gurung	(Hong Kong) (Nepal)	14 July 2004 (age 22)	Youth Team	2022	2025
59	Ihsan Yasinjan	(China)	18 October 2004 (age 21)	(China) Shandong Taishan U19	2025	2026
65	Wong Fred Yang	(Hong Kong)	6 March 2009 (age 17)	Youth Team	2025	2026
	Leung Tsz-Yin	(Hong Kong)	21 January 2009 (age 17)	Youth Team	2024	2025
	Lin Long-Tik	(Hong Kong)	21 January 2008 (age 18)	Youth Team	2024	2025
	Kan Hau-Yin	(Hong Kong)	15 October 2008 (age 17)	Hong Kong Rangers Youth	2024	2025
Forwards
33	Gao Ming Ho	(Hong Kong)	7 April 2008 (age 18)	Youth Team	2024	2025
66	Gao Ming Ngai	(Hong Kong)	7 April 2008 (age 18)	Youth Team	2024	2025
	Chui Wai-Lok	(Hong Kong)	28 March 2006 (age 20)	Youth Team	2024	2025
	Jeremy Lui Tsz-Kiu	(Hong Kong)	8 May 2007 (age 19)	Youth Team	2024	2025
	Kwan Cheuk-Yin	(Hong Kong)	6 January 2009 (age 17)	Youth Team	2024	2025
	Josh Yiu Ho-Chit	(Hong Kong)	14 February 2007 (age 19)	Hong Kong Rangers Youth	2024	2025
Players who have played but left the team mid-season

== Transfers ==
=== Transfers in ===
Pre-Season

Position	Player	Transferred from	Ref
GK	(Hong Kong) Ko Chun	(Hong Kong) Lee Man	Free
DF	(New Zealand) (England) Marco Lorenz	(New Zealand) Auckland United (N1)	Free
DF	(Hong Kong) Lau Kwan-Ching	(Hong Kong) North District FC	Free
DF	(Hong Kong) Yiu Ho Ming	Hong Kong Rangers	Free
DF	(South Korea) Koo Ja-ryong	(South Korea) Bucheon FC 1995 (K2)	Free
DF	(China) Ihsan Yasinjan	(China) Shandong Taishan U19	Free
MF	(Bolivia) Jorge Carreón Negrete	(Spain) UE Cornellà (S5)	Free
MF	(Hong Kong) Wong Fred Yang	Youth Team	Free
FW	(Brazil) Gil	(Thailand) Chanthaburi (T2)	Free
FW	(Hong Kong) Chang Kwong Yin	Hong Kong Rangers	Free
FW	(Japan) Yu Okubo	(Australia) NWS Spirit (A2)	Free
FW	(Japan) Taiga Kawano	(Australia) Northern Tigers (A3)	Free

Mid-Season

Position	Player	Transferred from	Ref
GK	(Spain) (Italy) Gianni Cassaro	(Spain) Sabadell	Free
MF	(Hong Kong) Yu Joy Yin	(China) Shijiazhuang Gongfu	Free

=== Loans In ===
Pre-Season

Position	Player	Transferred from	Ref

=== Transfers out ===
Preseason

Position	Player	Transferred To	Ref
DF	(Norway) Nii Noye Narh	(Spain)	Free
DF	(Colombia) Carlos Pérez	(Peru) Binacional	Free
DF	(Serbia) Aleksander Mitrovic	(Thailand) Nongbua Pitchaya	Free
DF	(Hong Kong) (France) Clement Benhaddouche	(China) Shenzhen Juniors	Free
DF	(Hong Kong) Siu Chung Nam	(Hong Kong)	Free
DF	(Hong Kong) Lam Chin Yu	(Hong Kong) Kowloon City	Free
MF	(Hong Kong) Lee Chun Ting	(Hong Kong) Kowloon City	Free
MF	(Hong Kong) Ma Hei Wai	(China) Shaanxi Union	Undisclosed
MF	(China) Gu Bin	(Hong Kong) Eastern District	Free
FW	(Ghana) (Spain) Noah Baffoe	(Hong Kong) Lee Man	Undisclosed
FW	(Spain) Víctor Bertomeu	(Italy) SSD Ischia Calcio	Free
FW	(Hong Kong) Liu Hing Yau	(Hong Kong)	Free

=== Loans Return (Out) ===
Pre-Season

Position	Player	Transferred To	Ref
DF	(Hong Kong) (England) (Sweden) Alexander Jojo	(Norway) IK Oddevold	Season loan (Note: Loan extended for another season)

== Team statistics ==
=== Appearances and goals ===
As of 28 Feb 26

No.	Pos.	Player	HKPL		FA Cup		League Cup		Challenge Shield		AFC Champions League 2		Total	
No.	Pos.	Player	Apps.	Goals	Apps.	Goals	Apps.	Goals	Apps.	Goals	Apps.	Goals	Apps.	Goals
1	GK	(Hong Kong) Yapp Hung Fai	3	0	0	0	0	0	1	0	3	0	7	0
2	DF	(Scotland) Calum Hall	12	1	0	0	1	0	1	0	4	0	18	1
5	DF	(New Zealand) (England) Marco Lorenz	10+1	0	0	0	1	0	1	0	5+1	0	19	0
7	FW	(Japan) Taiga Kawano	2+1	0	0	0	0	0	0	0	1+3	0	7	0
8	MF	(Bolivia) Jorge Carreón Negrete	1+4	1	0	0	1	0	0	0	0	0	6	1
9	FW	(Japan) Yu Okubo	13	8	0	0	1	1	1	3	4+1	1	20	13
10	FW	(Hong Kong) (Spain) Manolo Bleda	7+6	2	0	0	0	0	1	0	1+4	0	19	2
11	FW	(Brazil) Felipe Sá	4+2	0	0	0	0	0	0	0	0	0	6	0
14	MF	align="left" (Hong Kong) Yu Joy Yin	3	0	0	0	0	0	0	0	0	0	3	0
15	MF	(Hong Kong) Lau Kwan-Ching	7+6	0	0	0	1	0	1	0	3+3	0	21	0
16	MF	(Hong Kong) Leung Chun Pong	7+6	0	0	0	0	0	0+1	0	4+2	0	20	0
19	DF	(Hong Kong) Yiu Ho Ming	4+3	0	0	0	1	0	1	0	1+1	0	11	0
20	DF	(South Korea) Ku Ja-ryong	6	1	0	0	0	0	0+1	0	5	0	12	1
21	DF	(Spain) Daniel Almazan	9+2	0	0	0	0	0	1	0	4+1	0	17	0
22	DF	(Hong Kong) Leung Kwun Chung	10+4	0	0	0	1	0	0+1	0	4+2	0	22	0
24	GK	(Spain) Gianni Cassaro	4	0	0	0	0	0	0	0	0	0	4	0
25	GK	(Hong Kong) Wilson Ko Chun	3	0	0	0	0	0	0	0	0	0	3	0
26	GK	(Hong Kong) Liu Fu Yuen	3	0	0	0	1	0	0	0	4	0	8	0
27	MF	(Spain) Marcos Gondra	14	7	0	0	1	0	1	0	5	0	21	7
28	MF	(Hong Kong) Siu Ching	0+1	0	0	0	0+1	0	0	0	0	0	2	0
30	DF	(Hong Kong) Wong Tsz Ho	5+1	0	0	0	0+1	0	0+1	0	4+1	0	13	0
32	MF	(Hong Kong) Lam Hin Ting	12	1	0	0	0+1	0	0+1	0	5+1	0	20	1
33	MF	(Hong Kong) Gao Ming Ho	2+1	0	0	0	0+1	0	0	0	2+4	0	10	0
37	MF	(Hong Kong) Chang Kwong Yin	5+5	0	0	0	1	0	1	0	1+1	0	14	0
40	GK	(Hong Kong) Chung Hoi Man	0	0	0	0	0	0	0	0	0	0	0	0
42	MF	(Hong Kong) Yeung Tung Ki	0+4	0	0	0	0	0	0	0	0	0	4	0
43	DF	(Hong Kong) (Italy) Uriel Contiero	0+4	0	0	0	0	0	0	0	0+1	0	5	0
44	MF	(Hong Kong) (Nepal) Prabhat Gurung	0	0	0	0	0	0	0	0	0	0	0	0
59	MF	(China) Ihsan Yasinjan	0+1	0	0	0	0	0	0	0	0+1	0	2	0
65	MF	(Hong Kong) Wong Fred Yang	4+5	0	0	0	0+1	0	0	0	2+1	0	13	0
88	DF	(Hong Kong) Cheung Man Ho	0+1	0	0	0	0	0	0	0	0	0	1	0
91	FW	(Brazil) Gil	3+5	0	0	0	1	0	1	0	4+1	1	15	1
Players who left during season

== Friendlies ==
Win Draw Loss

=== Per-Season ===
2025 TCRFC International Cup (24 July - 1 Aug)

27 July 2025 1	Rot-Weiss Essen (Germany)	3–0	(Hong Kong) Eastern	Taichung, Chinese Taipei
				Stadium: Taichung Football Field

29 July 2025 2	Taichung Futuro (Chinese Taipei)	1–1	(Hong Kong) Eastern	Taichung, Chinese Taipei
				Stadium: Taichung Football Field

31 July 2025 3	Taichung Recereational FC (Chinese Taipei)	cancelled	(Hong Kong) Eastern	Taichung, Chinese Taipei
				Stadium: Taichung Football Field

== Competition ==
=== Hong Kong Premier League ===
Win Draw Loss

29 August 2025 1	Eastern	0–1	Kitchee	Mong Kok, Kowloon
18:00		Report	Cheng Chin Lung 35'; Matheus Dantas (yellow card) 61'; Juninho (yellow card) 90+1'	Stadium: Mong Kok Stadium; Referee: Liu Kwok Man

13 September 2025 2	Eastern	2–1	Kowloon City	Mong Kok, Kowloon
18:00	Yu Okubu 45+2'; Manolo Bleda 52'; Leung Chun Pong (yellow card) 51'; Marcos Gondra Krug (yellow card) 89'; Wong Tsz Ho (yellow card) 90+5'	Report	Park Ming-yu 13'; Kang Jun-hyeon (yellow card) 15'; Tsang Kam To (yellow card) 60'; Bah Mamadou Habib (yellow card) 64'; Lee Chun Ting (yellow card) 79'; Azevedo Junior Valdenilson (yellow card) 85'	Stadium: Mong Kok Stadium; Referee: Poon Chun-kit

21 September 2025 3	Southern	1–1	Eastern	Aberdeen, Hong Kong Island
18:00	Stefan Pereira 11' (pen.); Lee Kar Yiu (yellow card) 67'	Report	Marcos Gondra 24'; Daniel Almazan (yellow card) 29'	Stadium: Aberdeen Sports Ground; Referee: Tang Hing-fu

19 October 2025 4	BC Rangers	1–1	Eastern	Tsing Yi, New Territories
18:00	Marcos Gondra 54' (yellow card) 85'; Lau Chi Lok (yellow card) 20'; Lee Wing Ho (yellow card) 23'	Report	Marcos Gondra 54' (yellow card) 85'; Yiu Ho Ming (yellow card) 43'; Ku Jar-yong (yellow card) 89'	Stadium: Tsing Yi Sports Ground; Attendance: 457; Referee: Tam Ping-wun

26 October 2025 5	Tai Po	3–1	Eastern	Tsing Yi, New Territories
18:00	Paulo Sérgio 45'; Michel Renner 47'; James Temelkovski 90+1'; Daciel (yellow card) 45+2'; Fernando (yellow card) 59'; Mikael (yellow card) 81'	Report	Calum Hall 45+3'; Marcos Gondra (yellow card) 27'; Lam Hin Ting (yellow card) 54'	Stadium: Tsing Yi Sports Ground; Attendance: 921; Referee: Liu Kwok-man

1 November 2025 6	Eastern District	1–0	Eastern	Siu Sai Wan, Chai Wan
18:00	Gu Bin 62' (yellow card) 56'; Valentino Yuel (yellow card) 10'; Leon Jones (yellow card) 21'; Ahmed Waseem Razeek (yellow card) 76'; Marcus McMillan (yellow card) 80'; Cheuk-Kwan Yeung (yellow card) 90'	Report	Lam Hin Ting (yellow card) 68'	Stadium: Siu Sai Wan Sports Ground; Attendance: 706; Referee: Wong o-sing

9 November 2025 7	HKFC	0–4	Eastern	Happy Valley, Hong Kong Island
18:00	Leo Montesinos (yellow card) 45' (yellow-red card) 68'; Enzo Dietrich (yellow card) 52'; Wong Tsz Chung (yellow card) 90'	Report	Yu Okubu 16', 64'; Ku Jar-yong 70' (yellow card) 35'; Marcos Gondra Krug 84'	Stadium: Hong Kong Football Club Stadium; Attendance: 608; Referee: Wong Wai Lun

7 December 2025 8 (Rescheduled)	Kowloon City	2–1	Eastern	Siu Sai Wan, Chai Wan
18:00	Kessi 50'; Kayron 55' (yellow card) 30'; Diego Eli (yellow card) 36'	Report	Yu Okubo 20'; Calum Hall (yellow card) 22'; Lam Hin Tin (yellow card) 51' (yellow-red card); Ku Jar-yong (yellow card) 60'; Daniel Almazan (yellow card) 75'	Stadium: Siu Sai Wan Sports Ground; Attendance: 414

14 December 2025 9	Eastern	2–1	Tai Po	Mong Kok, Kowloon
18:00	Yu Okubo 59'; Marcos Gondra 67' (yellow card) 26'; Calum Hall (yellow card) 36'; Leung Kwun Chung (yellow card) 38'; Daniel Almazan (yellow card) 63'	Report	Lucas Silva 42' (yellow card) 47'; Sung Wang Ngai Kohki Takizawa (yellow card) 16'; Patrick Valverde (yellow card) 32'; Law Chun Ting (yellow card) 45+3'; Michel Renner (yellow card) 47'	Stadium: Mong Kok Stadium; Attendance: 1,108; Referee: Woo Chun Sing

18 January 2026 10	Eastern	3–1	KC Southern	Mong Kok, Kowloon
18:00	Lam Hin Tin 60'; Marcos Gondra Krug 69', 75'; Wong Fred Yang (yellow card) 14'; Calum Hall (yellow card) 84'; Lau Kwan Ching (yellow card) 90+4'		Stefan Pereira 29' (yellow card) 87'; Murillo (yellow card) 48'; Kota Kawase (yellow card) 64'; Chak Ting Fong (yellow card) 71'; Shu Sasaki (yellow card) 74'	Stadium: Mong Kok Stadium; Attendance: 837; Referee: Tam Ping-wun

24 January 2026 11	Lee Man	8–1	Eastern	Mong Kok, Kowloon
18:00	Lau Ka Kiu 30'; Ryoya Tachibana 36'; Everton Camargo 66', 89', 90+5'; Noah Baffoe	Report	Jorge Carreón 88'; Leung Kwun Chung (yellow card) 26'; Lam Hin Ting (yellow card) 53'; Manuel Bleda (yellow card) 90+4'; Yiu Ho Ming (yellow card) 90+4'	Stadium: Mong Kok Stadium; Attendance: 1,487; Referee: Yu Kin Fung

28 January 2026 12	Eastern	1–4	North District	Mong Kok, Kowloon
18:00	Yu Okubo 40' (yellow card) 83'; Marco Lorenz (yellow card) 2'; Lam Hin Ting (yellow card) 49'	Report	Samuel Granada 44', 52' (pen.); David Villalobos 73'; Weverton Gudula 76'	Stadium: Mong Kok Stadium; Attendance: 817; Referee: Cheung Wai Lung

14 February 2026 13	North District	0–3	Eastern	Sheung Shui, New Territories
18:00	Elian David Villalobos (yellow card) 24'	Report	Macros Gondra 2'; Yu Okubo 17', 54'; Felipe Sa (yellow card) 52'; Yeung Tung Ki (red card) 88'	Stadium: North District Sports Ground; Attendance: 476; Referee: Luk Kin-sun

4 April 2026 14 (Rescheduled)	Eastern	–	BC Rangers	Mong Kok, Kowloon
18:00				Stadium: Mong Kok Stadium

28 February 2026 15	Eastern	1–1	Lee Man	Mong Kok, Kowloon
18:00	Manuel Bleda 5'; Marcos Gondra (yellow card) 52'; Lam Hin Ting (yellow card) 76'; Daniel Almazan (yellow card) 90+4'	Report	Mikael 45'	Stadium: Mong Kok Stadium; Attendance: 953; Referee: LAU Fong-hei

14 March 2026 16	Eastern	–	Eastern District	Mong Kok, Kowloon
18:00				Stadium: Mong Kok Stadium

21 March 2026 17	Kitchee	–	Eastern	Tseung Kwan O, New Territories
18:00				Stadium: Tseung Kwan O Sports Ground

11 April 2026 18	Eastern	–	HKFC	Mong Kok, Kowloon
18:00				Stadium: Mong Kok Stadium

Pos	Team	Pld	W	D	L	GF	GA	GD	Pts	Qualification or relegation (Note: Teams play each other twice (18 matches), before the league is split into two groups (the top five and the bottom five).)
1	Kitchee (C)	22	16	4	2	54	28	+26	52	Qualification for AFC Champions League Two group stage
2	Tai Po	22	13	4	5	49	32	+17	43	Qualification for AFC Champions League Two group stage (Note: Tai Po qualified for the AFC Champions League Two group stage as the 2025–26 Hong Kong FA Cup winners.)
3	Lee Man	22	12	6	4	57	26	+31	42	
4	Eastern	22	9	5	8	39	37	+2	32 (Note: Head-to-head points: Eastern 6, North District 3)	
5	North District	22	8	8	6	43	39	+4	32	
6	Kowloon City	22	8	4	10	28	39	−11	28	
7	Southern	22	7	4	11	28	35	−7	25	
8	Eastern District	22	5	6	11	20	22	−2	21 (Note: Head-to-head points: Eastern District 7, Rangers 1)	
9	Rangers	22	6	3	13	26	44	−18	21	
10	HKFC	22	3	2	17	18	60	−42	11	

Source: Hong Kong Football Association
Rules for classification: 1) Points; 2) Head-to-head points; 3) Head-to-head goal difference; 4) Head-to-head goals scored; 5) Goal difference; 6) Goals scored; 7) Fair-play points; 8) Drawing lots (Play-off if the winner has to be decided).
(C) Champions

=== Hong Kong League Cup ===
6 September 2025 Round 1	Tai Po	3–1	Eastern	Tsing Yi, New Territories
16:00	James Temelkovski 50', 90+2'; Igor Sartori 54' (pen.); Weverton (yellow card) 57'; Mikael Guterres (yellow card) 68'; Law Chun Ting (yellow card) 89'	Report	Yu Okubo 38' (pen.); Calum Hall (yellow card) 53'; Wong Fred Yang (yellow card) 69'; Lam Hin Ting (yellow card) 80'	Stadium: Tsing Yi Sports Ground; Referee: Poon Chun-kit

=== Hong Kong FA Cup ===
7 March 2026 Quarter Final	Eastern	0–0 (3–4 p)	Eastern District	Tsing Yi Sports Ground
15:00		Report		Attendance: 442; Referee: Poon Chun Kit
	Penalties
	Okubo (penalty scored); Bleda (penalty missed); Lorenz (penalty scored); Hall (penalty scored); Yiu Ho Ming (penalty missed)		Gu Bin (penalty scored); Bruno Luiz (penalty scored); Takatori (penalty scored); Li Ngai Hoi (penalty missed); Chang Hei Yin (penalty scored)

=== Hong Kong Senior Challenge Shield ===
27 September 2025 Quarter Final	Eastern	3–0	HKFC	Tai Po, New Territories
15:00	Yu Okubo 81' (pen.), 84', 87'	Report	Ho Tung Lam (yellow card) 45+1'; Leonardo Manuel Montesinos (yellow card) 45+2'; Félix Alejandro Pérez-Doyle (yellow card) 68'; Wong Tsz Chung (yellow card) 72'	Stadium: Tai Po Sports Ground; Attendance: 226; Referee: Luk Kin Sun

8 February 2026 Semi Final	Eastern	1–3	BC Rangers	Mong Kok, Kowloon
15:00	Yu Okubo 37' (pen.); Jesse Yu (yellow card) 36'; Felipe Sa (yellow card) 74'	Report	Nassam Ibrahim 27'; Mauricio Cortés 30' (yellow card) 30'; Lau Chi Lok 77'; Ansah Maxwell (yellow card) 64'; Matias Panigazzi (yellow card) 90+2'	Stadium: Mong Kok Stadium; Attendance: 982; Referee: Wong Wai-lun

=== AFC Champions League Two ===
==== Group stage ====
Pos	Team	Pld	W	D	L	GF	GA	GD	Pts	Qualification	GOS	RPM	TND	EAS
1	(Japan) Gamba Osaka	6	6	0	0	16	2	+14	18	Advance to round of 16	—	2–0	3–1	3–1
2	(Thailand) Ratchaburi	6	3	0	3	15	8	+7	9	Advance to round of 16	0–2	—	2–0	5–1
3	(Vietnam) Nam Định	6	3	0	3	14	7	+7	9		0–1	3–1	—	9–0
4	(Hong Kong) Eastern	6	0	0	6	2	30	−28	0		0–5	0–7	0–1	—

Source: ACL2
Rules for classification: Tiebreakers

17 October 2025 1	Gamba Osaka (Japan)	3–1	(Hong Kong) Eastern	Osaka, Japan
	Welton Felipe 28'; Takashi Usami 70'; Deniz Hümmet 75'; Ryoya Yamashita (yellow card) 90+1'	Report	Gil 29' (yellow card) 90+1'; Yu Okubo (yellow card) 14'; Calum Hall (red card) 72'	Stadium: Suita City Football Stadium; Attendance: 6,640; Referee: Meder Taichiev (Kyrgyzstan)

2 October 2025 2	Eastern (Hong Kong)	0–1	(Vietnam) Nam Dinh	Mong Kok, Hong Kong
	Taiga Kawano (yellow card) 16'	Report	Kristoffer Hansen 54'; Kevin Pham Ba (yellow card) 17'; Brenner (yellow card) 24'; Caíque Santos (yellow card) 90+4'	Stadium: Mong Kok Stadium; Referee: Hassan Akrami (Iran)

22 October 2025 3	Ratchaburi (Thailand)	5–1	(Hong Kong) Eastern	Ratchaburi, Thailand
	Tana 2'; Denílson 39', 49', 56'; Ikhsan Fandi 89'; Thossawat Limwannasathian (yellow card) 79'; Suporn Peenagatapho (yellow card) 87'	Report	Yu Okubo 74' (yellow card) 59'; Daniel Almazan (yellow card) 21'; Lau Kwan Ching (yellow card) 81'; Ming-Ho Gao (yellow card) 90+1'	Stadium: Dragon Solar Park; Referee: Baraa Aisha (Palestine)

5 November 2025 4	Eastern (Hong Kong)	0–7	(Thailand) Ratchaburi	Mong Kok, Hong Kong
	Lam Hin Ting (yellow card) 32'; Marcos Gondra (yellow card) 49'; Koo Ja-Ryoung (yellow card) 90+2'	Report	Scott Allardice 52'; Tana 56', 72'; Denílson 65', 83'; Ikhsan Fandi 89', 90+5'; Negueba (yellow card) 29'; Sidcley (yellow card) 37'; Daniel Almazan (yellow card) 79'	Stadium: Mong Kok Stadium; Referee: Venkatesh Ramachandran (India)

27 November 2025 5	Eastern (Hong Kong)	0–5	(Japan) Gamba Osaka	Mong Kok, Hong Kong
	Daniel Almazan (yellow card) 27'; Gao Ming Ho (yellow card) 63'; Marcos Gondra (yellow card) 65'; Leung Kwun Chung (yellow card) 90+2'	Report	Shota Fukuoka 3'; Ryoya Yamashita 19'; Shuto Abe 33' (yellow card) 37'; Deniz Hümmet 59'; Gaku Nawata 75'; Kanji Okunuki (yellow card) 85'	Stadium: Mong Kok Stadium; Referee: Ahmad A'Qashah (Singapore)

11 December 2025 6	Nam Dinh (Vietnam)	9–0	(Hong Kong) Eastern	Ninh Bình, Vietnam
	Caio César 2'; Kevin Pham Ba 4'; Ly Công Hoàng Anh 10' (yellow card) 25'; Rômulo 17', 19'; Brenner 42', 59' (pen.), 64'; Leung Chun Pong 90+2' (o.g.)	Report	Lau Kwan Ching (yellow card) 25'	Stadium: Thiên Trường Stadium; Referee: Kim Dae-yong (South Korea)
