= 2023–24 Hong Kong Sapling Cup =

Football tournament season

2023–24 JC Sapling Cup
Tournament details
- Country: Hong Kong
- Dates: 30 September 2023 – 15 May 2024
- Teams: 11

Final positions
- Champions: Rangers
- Runners-up: Kitchee

Tournament statistics
- Matches played: 53
- Goals scored: 209 (3.94 per match)
- Attendance: 21,288 (402 per match)
- Top goal scorer(s): Noah Baffoe; Ismael Dunga; Nassam Ibrahim; Mikael (7 goals each)

Awards
- Best player: Nassam Ibrahim

The 2023–24 Hong Kong Sapling Cup (named as JC Sapling Cup for sponsorship reasons) was the 9th edition of the Hong Kong Sapling Cup. The competition was contested by the 11 teams in the 2023–24 Hong Kong Premier League. Each team was required to field a minimum of three players born on or after 1 January 2002 (U-22) and a maximum of six foreign players during every whole match.

Southern were the defending champions, but were eliminated in the semi-finals. Rangers became the champions for the first time after beating Kitchee in the final.

The champions of the JC Sapling Cup received HKD$120,000 in prize money, and HKD$100,000 donation to the champions' specified organization. Meanwhile, the runner-up received HKD$60,000, and HKD$50,000 donation to the runner-up's specified organization. In addition, the two losing teams in the semi-finals received HK$30,000 while the remaining teams received HK$15,000.

In addition, the best U-22 player in each team received a prize of HKD$3,000. The most outstanding U-22 player among the selected best U-22 players from each team received an additional HKD$5,000 for being the best of all the U-22 players.

== Format ==
The participating teams were divided into two groups for a double round-robin tournament. Top two teams in each group advance to the semi-finals.

== Calendar ==
Phase	Draw Date	Date	Matches	Clubs
Group stage	20 September 2023	30 September 2023 – 24 March 2024	50	11 → 4
Semi-finals	20 September 2023	3, 10 April 2024	2	4 → 2
Final	20 September 2023	15 May 2024	1	2 → 1

== Fixtures and results ==
=== Group stage ===
==== Group A ====
Pos	Team	Pld	W	D	L	GF	GA	GD	Pts	Qualification
1	Southern	10	6	4	0	25	10	+15	22	Advance to Semi-finals
2	Tai Po	10	6	1	3	19	13	+6	19	Advance to Semi-finals
3	Eastern	10	4	5	1	25	14	+11	17	
4	HKFC	10	3	3	4	19	23	−4	12	
5	Sham Shui Po	10	2	1	7	15	33	−18	7	
6	HK U23	10	1	2	7	11	21	−10	5	

Updated to match(es) played on 23 March 2024. Source: HKFA
Rules for classification: 1) Points; 2) Head-to-head points; 3) Head-to-head goal difference; 4) Goal difference; 5) Goals scored.

15 October 2023 SP04	Tai Po	2–1	HKFC	Siu Sai Wan Sports Ground
15:00	Kayron 38'; Chung Wai Keung 52'	Report	Johns 36'	Attendance: 388; Referee: Yu Kin Fung

15 October 2023 SP05	Southern	2–2	Eastern	Siu Sai Wan Sports Ground
18:00	Sasaki 5'; Kawase 59'	Report	Baffoe 26'; Ma Hei Wai 29'	Attendance: 388; Referee: Ho Wai Sing

15 November 2023 SP06	HKFC	2–0	Tai Po	Kowloon Bay Park
20:30	Maciel 34'; Johns 90+1'	Report		Attendance: 166; Referee: Yu Kin Fung

19 November 2023 SP08	Sham Shui Po	0–4	Southern	Kowloon Bay Park
15:00		Report	Pereira 11' (pen.), 49', 77' (pen.); Kawase 21'	Attendance: 273; Referee: Yu Kin Fung

19 November 2023 SP10	HK U23	0–1	Tai Po	Siu Sai Wan Sports Ground
18:00		Report	Luizinho 12'	Attendance: 275; Referee: Wong Po Sing

26 November 2023 SP11	Eastern	4–1	HKFC	Sham Shui Po Sports Ground
15:00	Ma Hei Wai 37', 66'; Marcos 68'; Baffoe 76'	Report	Léo 5'	Attendance: 254; Referee: Luk Kin Sun

3 December 2023 SP12	Sham Shui Po	0–3	Tai Po	Kowloon Bay Park
15:00		Report	Chan Siu Kwan 14'; Renner 65'; Marcão 71'	Attendance: 161; Referee: Ho Wai Sing

3 December 2023 SP13	Eastern	2–2	HK U23	Mong Kok Stadium
18:00	Ng Yu Hei 41'; Wong Ho Chun 59'	Report	Lee Lok Him 79'; Ho Ka Chi 83'	Attendance: 272; Referee: Poon Chun Kit

6 December 2023 SP14	Tai Po	2–1	Eastern	Kowloon Bay Park
20:30	Marcão 17'; Luizinho 24'	Report	Wong Ho Yin 71'	Attendance: 261; Referee: Wong Po Sing

24 December 2023 SP18	Sham Shui Po	4–4	HKFC	Hong Kong Football Club Stadium
15:00	Chang Kwong Yin 25'; Dunga 33', 50'; Song Ju-ho 37'	Report	Thiago 19' (pen.), 72'; Paulinho 52'; Ngue 88' (pen.)	Attendance: 192; Referee: Tang Hing Fu

25 December 2023 SP19	Eastern	2–2	Tai Po	Kowloon Bay Park
15:00	Almazan 62'; Wong Ho Yin 86'	Report	Kayron 63'; Renner 90+2'	Attendance: 442; Referee: Law Bik Chi

30 December 2023 SP20	Sham Shui Po	0–5	HK U23	Kowloon Bay Park
15:00		Report	Tang In Chim 25', 61'; Lo Kam Wang 47'; Lam Chi Fung 64'; Lam Hok Hei 90+2'	Attendance: 203; Referee: Wong Po Sing

31 December 2023 SP21	Southern	2–2	HKFC	Hong Kong Football Club Stadium
15:00	Kessi 20' (pen.); Merkies 71'	Report	Henrique 57'; Lau Hok Ming 65'	Attendance: 358; Referee: Cheung Wai Lung

6 January 2024 SP22	Southern	3–1	Tai Po	Aberdeen Sports Ground
15:00	Jackson 11'; Sasaki 56'; Chan Yun Tung 73'	Report	Cividini 63'	Attendance: 351; Referee: Luk Kin Sun

6 January 2024 SP23	Eastern	3–0	Sham Shui Po	Kowloon Bay Park
15:00	Baffoe 6'; Jones 37'; Narh 79' (o.g.)	Report		Attendance: 190; Referee: Tang Hing Fu

7 January 2024 SP26	HKFC	2–1	HK U23	Hong Kong Football Club Stadium
16:30	Paulinho 34'; Thiago 72' (pen.)	Report	Lau Ka Kiu 8'	Attendance: 256; Referee: Woo Chun Sing

13 January 2024 SP27	Southern	3–1	Sham Shui Po	Aberdeen Sports Ground
15:00	Jackson 6'; Chen Ngo Hin 30'; Awal 53'	Report	Dunga 74'	Attendance: 217; Referee: Wong Po Sing

14 January 2024 SP30	Tai Po	4–0	HK U23	Tai Po Sports Ground
15:00	Biteco 22'; Lucas 41', 61'; Marcão 58'	Report		Attendance: 333; Referee: Tam Ping Wun

14 January 2024 SP31	HKFC	3–3	Eastern	Hong Kong Football Club Stadium
16:30	Thiago 56'; Léo 80'; Fray 90+5'	Report	Baffoe 11', 90+2'; Ma Hei Wai 24'	Attendance: 353; Referee: Law Bik Chi

17 January 2024 SP32	HK U23	1–1	Southern	Kowloon Bay Park
20:30	Lam Chi Fung 84'	Report	Sasaki 15'	Attendance: 191; Referee: Wong Wai Lun

21 January 2024 SP35	Tai Po	4–2	Sham Shui Po	Tai Po Sports Ground
15:00	Lau Ka Shing 1' (o.g.); Lucas 18', 72'; Biteco 30'	Report	Chang Kwong Yin 51'; Dunga 53'	Attendance: 330; Referee: Luk Kin Sun

21 January 2024 SP36	HK U23	1–2	Eastern	Kowloon Bay Park
15:00	Ho Ka Chi 36'	Report	Gondra 26'; Baffoe 86'	Attendance: 176; Referee: Chow Hon Fai

21 January 2024 SP37	HKFC	2–4	Southern	Hong Kong Football Club Stadium
16:30	Léo 27', 44'	Report	Awal 58', 90+6'; Chan Hoi Pak 88'; Merkies 89'	Attendance: 333; Referee: Poon Chun Kit

28 January 2024 SP39	Eastern	1–1	Southern	Sham Shui Po Sports Ground
15:00	Almazan 81'	Report	Awal 45+1'	Attendance: 448; Referee: Yu Kin Fung

28 January 2024 SP42	HKFC	1–3	Sham Shui Po	Hong Kong Football Club Stadium
16:30	Léo 52'	Report	I. Marković 25' (pen.); Dunga 45', 83'	Attendance: 160; Referee: Cheung Wai Lung

31 January 2024 SP43	Southern	3–0	HK U23	Kowloon Bay Park
20:00	Awal 20'; Chan Yun Tung 81'; Jackson 89'	Report		Attendance: 126; Referee: Tam Ping Wun

7 February 2024 SP45	HK U23	0–1	HKFC	Kowloon Bay Park
20:00		Report	Johns 71'	Attendance: 83; Referee: Liu Kwok Man

28 February 2024 SP46	Tai Po	0–2	Southern	Mong Kok Stadium
20:00		Report	Pereira 75' (pen.); Ichikawa 81'	Attendance: 423; Referee: Poon Chun Kit

9 March 2024 SP48	HK U23	1–5	Sham Shui Po	Hammer Hill Road Sports Ground
15:00	Ng Man Hei 43'	Report	Wellingsson 12', 45', 58', 68'; Dunga 76'	Attendance: 79; Referee: Tang Hing Fu

23 March 2024 SP49	Sham Shui Po	0–5	Eastern	Aberdeen Sports Ground
15:00		Report	Leung Kwun Chung 30'; Braunshtain 32'; Baffoe 45'; Bosley Yu 68', 86'	Attendance: 245; Referee: Cheung Wai Lung

==== Group B ====
Pos	Team	Pld	W	D	L	GF	GA	GD	Pts	Qualification
1	Kitchee	8	5	1	2	26	14	+12	16	Advance to Semi-finals
2	Rangers	8	4	3	1	22	18	+4	15	Advance to Semi-finals
3	North District	8	4	2	2	15	12	+3	14	
4	Resources Capital	8	1	2	5	10	24	−14	5 (Note: Head-to-head points: Resources Capital 4, Lee Man 1.)	
5	Lee Man	8	1	2	5	12	17	−5	5	

Updated to match(es) played on 24 March 2024. Source: HKFA
Rules for classification: 1) Points; 2) Head-to-head points; 3) Head-to-head goal difference; 4) Goal difference; 5) Goals scored.
Notes:

30 September 2023 SP01	Kitchee	6–2	Resources Capital	Mong Kok Stadium
15:00	Juninho 8'; Mikael 31', 40' (pen.), 41'; Tan Chun Lok 45+3'; Jantscher 87'	Report	Lui Cheuk Kan 62'; Ki Sze Ho 64'	Attendance: 602; Referee: Liu Kwok Man

14 October 2023 SP02	Lee Man	1–1	North District	Siu Sai Wan Sports Ground
15:00	Paulinho 22'	Report	Lo Kong Wai 70'	Attendance: 486; Referee: Tang Hing Fu

14 October 2023 SP03	Kitchee	2–3	Rangers	Siu Sai Wan Sports Ground
18:00	Mikael 44', 74'	Report	Lau Chi Lok 12'; Kim Min-kyu 57' (pen.); Kanda 79'	Attendance: 486; Referee: Wong Wai Lun

18 November 2023 SP07	Lee Man	1–4	Kitchee	Tseung Kwan O Sports Ground
15:00	Gil 47'	Report	Juninho 12'; Cleiton 56'; Russell 60'; Jantscher 79'	Attendance: 638; Referee: Wong Wai Lun

19 November 2023 SP09	Resources Capital	1–5	North District	Siu Sai Wan Sports Ground
15:00	Ho Sze Chit 3'	Report	Neném 15'; Matheus 22' (pen.); Chan Ho Ka 24'; Wong Wai Kwok 61'; Lo Kong Wai 90'	Attendance: 275; Referee: Cheung Wai Lung

16 December 2023 SP15	Lee Man	3–4	Rangers	Kowloon Bay Park
15:00	Paulinho 38' (pen.), 85' (pen.); Gil 54'	Report	Kanda 36'; Loong Tsz Hin 39'; Ibrahim 57'; Fernando 63'	Attendance: 317; Referee: Woo Chun Sing

23 December 2023 SP16	Resources Capital	2–1	Lee Man	Kowloon Bay Park
15:00	Ho Sze Chit 28'; Yuen Sai Kit 90+1'	Report	Acosta 83'	Attendance: 207; Referee: Luk Kin Sun

23 December 2023 SP17	Rangers	4–4	Kitchee	Mong Kok Stadium
15:00	Leung Hoi Chun 13'; Ibrahim 26' (pen.); Chiu Ching Yu 90+2'; Kanda 90+3'	Report	Yuen Chun Him 10', 70'; Cheng Chin Lung 49'; Yueng Cheuk Kwan 83'	Attendance: 638; Referee: Liu Kwok Man

7 January 2024 SP24	Rangers	3–2	Resources Capital	Kowloon Bay Park
15:00	Lau Chi Lok 45'; Ibrahim 72', 79'	Report	Lee Ching 5'; Chiu Wan Chun 29'	Attendance: 222; Referee: Cheung Wai Lung

7 January 2024 SP25	North District	3–1	Lee Man	North District Sports Ground
15:00	Kendy 65'; Jordan Lam 78', 90+4'	Report	Paulinho 24'	Attendance: 469; Referee: Tam Ping Wun

13 January 2024 SP28	North District	1–1	Rangers	Hammer Hill Road Sports Ground
15:00	Wong Wai Kwok 54'	Report	Au Yeung Yiu Chung 80'	Attendance: 369; Referee: Yu Kin Fung

13 January 2024 SP29	Resources Capital	0–5	Kitchee	Kowloon Bay Park
15:00		Report	Russell 23'; Jantscher 35', 43'; Temirov 88'; Mikael 90+3'	Attendance: 268; Referee: Luk Kin Sun

20 January 2024 SP33	Rangers	0–4	Lee Man	Aberdeen Sports Ground
15:00		Report	Diego 1', 63'; Gil 30'; Paulissen 68'	Attendance: 189; Referee: Liu Kwok Man

20 January 2024 SP34	Kitchee	1–3	North District	Kowloon Bay Park
15:00	Russell 42'	Report	Matheus 8'; Kendy 81', 90+3'	Attendance: 293; Referee: Tam Ping Wun

24 January 2024 SP38	North District	2–1	Resources Capital	Kowloon Bay Park
20:00	Matheus 55', 75'	Report	Lee Yoon-kwon 65'	Attendance: 191; Referee: Wong Po Sing

28 January 2024 SP40	Rangers	5–0	North District	Kowloon Bay Park
15:00	Chiu Ching Yu 32', 77'; Ibrahim 36'; Kanda 61'; Lau Chi Lok 84'	Report		Attendance: 229; Referee: Tam Ping Wun

28 January 2024 SP41	Lee Man	0–0	Resources Capital	Hammer Hill Road Sports Ground
15:00		Report		Attendance: 227; Referee: Law Bik Chi

21 February 2024 SP44	North District	0–1	Kitchee	Mong Kok Stadium
20:00		Report	Juninho 63'	Attendance: 423; Referee: Luk Kin Sun

9 March 2024 SP47	Resources Capital	2–2	Rangers	Aberdeen Sports Ground
15:00	Tsui King Yau 2'; Lam Lok Yin 47'	Report	Kamigata 82'; Ibrahim 86'	Attendance: 109; Referee: Cheung Wai Lung

24 March 2024 SP50	Kitchee	3–1	Lee Man	Mong Kok Stadium
15:00	Temirov 3'; Cleiton 45+1'; Sartori 49'	Report	Cheng Siu Kwan 90'	Attendance: 1,015; Referee: Yu Kin Fung

=== Semi-finals ===
3 April 2024 SP51	Kitchee	4–3	Tai Po	Mong Kok Stadium
20:00	Cheng Chin Lung 33'; Mikael 45+2' (pen.); Juninho 61'; Tan Chun Lok 90+8'	Report	Lucas 6', 84'; Renner 45+7'	Attendance: 1,153; Referee: Wong Wai Lun

10 April 2024 SP52	Southern	0–2	Rangers	Mong Kok Stadium
20:00		Report	Kamigata 42'; Chan Yiu Cho 90+7'	Attendance: 1,006; Referee: Luk Kin Sun

=== Final ===
15 May 2024 SP53	Rangers	1–0	Kitchee	Mong Kok Stadium
15:00	Ibrahim 40'	Report		Attendance: 3,769; Referee: Liu Kwok Man

== Top scorers ==
Rank	Player	Club	Goals
1	(Spain) Noah Baffoe	Eastern	7
1	(Kenya) Ismael Dunga	Sham Shui Po	7
1	(Ghana) Nassam Ibrahim	Rangers	7
1	(Brazil) Mikael	Kitchee	7
5	(Brazil) Lucas Silva	Tai Po	6
6	(Hong Kong) Mahama Awal	Southern	5
6	(Brazil) Léo	HKFC	5
8	9 players		4

== Awards ==
=== Best U-22 Player ===
Prize	Team	Winner
Best U-22 Player in Each Team	Eastern	(Hong Kong) Ma Hei Wai
Best U-22 Player in Each Team	HKFC	(Hong Kong) Lee Chun Yin
Best U-22 Player in Each Team	HK U23	(Hong Kong) Lee Lok Him
Best U-22 Player in Each Team	Kitchee	(Hong Kong) Chan Shinichi
Best U-22 Player in Each Team	Lee Man	(Hong Kong) Poon Sheung Hei
Best U-22 Player in Each Team	North District	(Hong Kong) Lau Kwan Ching
Best U-22 Player in Each Team	Rangers	(Hong Kong) Chiu Ching Yu
Best U-22 Player in Each Team	Resources Capital	(Hong Kong) Pong Cheuk Hei
Best U-22 Player in Each Team	Southern	(Hong Kong) Ng Wai Him
Best U-22 Player in Each Team	Tai Po	(Hong Kong) Wong Hin Sum
Best U-22 Player in Each Team	Sham Shui Po	(Hong Kong) Chang Kwong Yin
Best of all U-22 Players	Rangers	(Hong Kong) Chiu Ching Yu
