= Yosuke Kamigata =

Japanese footballer (born 1992)

Yosuke Kamigata 上形 洋介
Personal information
- Full name: Yosuke Kamigata
- Date of birth: 25 September 1992 (age 34)
- Place of birth: Shinjuku, Tokyo, Japan
- Height: 1.80 m (5 ft 11 in)
- Position: Forward

Team information
- Current team: Vanraure Hachinohe
- Number: 38

Youth career
- –2004: SK FC
- 2005–2007: FC Tokyo Fukagawa
- 2008–2010: Waseda Jitsugyo School

College career
Years	Team	Apps	(Gls)
2011–2014	Waseda University		

Senior career*
Years	Team	Apps	(Gls)
2015–2016	V-Varen Nagasaki	9	(2)
2016	→ Tochigi SC (loan)	21	(2)
2017–2018	Tochigi SC	27	(4)
2019–2021	Vanraure Hachinohe	92	(27)
2022–2023	Giravanz Kitakyushu	38	(4)
2024	Hong Kong Rangers	7	(2)
2024–	Vanraure Hachinohe	4	(0)
- * Club domestic league appearances and goals as of 23:46, 28 August 2024 (UTC)

Yosuke Kamigata (上形 洋介, Kamigata Yosuke; born 25 September 1992) is a Japanese professional footballer who plays as a forward for Vanraure Hachinohe.

== College career ==
Kamigata won his second MVP award on 2 July 2014 against Keio University.

== Club career ==
=== V-Varen Nagasaki ===
Kamigata made his league debut against Zweigen Kanazawa on 31 May 2015. He scored his first league goal against Thespa Gunma on 22 July 2015, scoring in the 62nd minute.

=== First spell at Vanraure Hachinohe ===
On 9 January 2019, Kamigata was announced at Vanraure Hachinohe. He scored on his league debut against Gamba Osaka U-23 on 10 March 2019, scoring in the 69th minute.

On 6 August 2021, Kamigata was disciplined by the club for breaking the code of conduct.

=== Giravanz Kitakyushu ===
Kamigata made his league debut against Nagano Parceiro on 13 March 2022. He scored his first league goal against FC Imabari on 4 September 2022, scoring in the 55th minute.

=== Rangers ===
On 12 February 2024, Kamigata joined Hong Kong Premier League club Rangers. He made his league debut against Kitchee on 17 February 2024. Kamigata scored his first league goal against North District on 24 February 2024, scoring in the 35th minute.

=== Second spell at Vanraure Hachinohe ===
On 12 July 2024, Kamigata was announced at Vanraure Hachinohe. He made his league debut against Zweigen Kanazawa on 20 July 2024.

== Personal life ==
On 15 April 2020, Kamigata announced the birth of his first child.

== Career statistics ==
=== Club ===
Updated to 23 February 2020.

Club performance			League		Cup		Other		Total	
Season	Club	League	Apps	Goals	Apps	Goals	Apps	Goals	Apps	Goals
Japan			League		Emperor's Cup		Other^{1}		Total	
2015	V-Varen Nagasaki	J2 League	9	2	1	0	–		10	2
2016	Tochigi SC	J3 League	20	2	–		1	0	21	2
2017	Tochigi SC	J3 League	18	4	–		–		18	4
2018	Tochigi SC	J2 League	9	0	1	0	–		10	0
2019	Vanraure Hachinohe	J3 League	33	11	3	0	–		36	11
Career total			99	19	5	0	1	0	105	19

^{1}Includes J2/J3 Play-offs.

== Honours ==
=== Club ===
Rangers

- Hong Kong Sapling Cup: 2023–24
