= Marco Lorenz =

New Zealand footballer

Personal information
- Full name: Marco Moni Lorenz
- Date of birth: 17 October 2003 (age 23)
- Height: 1.82 m (6 ft 0 in)
- Position: Defender

Team information
- Current team: Gainare Tottori

Youth career
- Wellington Olympic
- North Wellington
- Tasman United
- Wellington United

Senior career*
Years	Team	Apps	(Gls)
2019–2020	Tasman United	3	(0)
2021	Wellington Olympic	9	(0)
2021	Lower Hutt City	8	(0)
2021–2023	Wellington Phoenix Reserves	28	(0)
2022–2023	Wellington Phoenix	0	(0)
2024	Schwarz-Weiß Rehden	0	(0)
2024	Western Springs	13	(1)
2024	Auckland City	12	(0)
2025	Auckland United	16	(0)
2025–2026	Eastern	18	(0)
2026–	Gainare Tottori	0	(0)

International career^{‡}
2022–2023	New Zealand U20	6	(0)
- * Club domestic league appearances and goals as of 17 May 2026 ‡ National team caps and goals as of 21 February 2023

Marco Moni Lorenz (born 17 October 2003) is a New Zealand professional footballer who plays as a defender for Gainare Tottori.

== Club career ==
=== Youth career ===
Lorenz played for Wellington Olympic, North Wellington, Tasman United and Wellington United at youth level.

=== Wellington Phoenix ===
On 3 August 2022, Lorenz made his debut for the Wellington Phoenix in an Australia Cup match against Devonport City.

=== Schwarz-Weiß Rehden ===
After leaving Wellington Phoenix, Lorenz signed for Schwarz-Weiß Rehden on 2 February 2024.

=== Western Springs ===
After not making any appearances for Schwarz-Weiß Rehden, Lorenz returned to New Zealand and signed for Western Springs.

=== Auckland City ===
Lorenz signed for Auckland City on 30 June 2024. He went on to make 12 appearances and was part of the squad for the 2024 FIFA Intercontinental Cup.

=== Auckland United ===
On 18 March 2024, Lorenz signed for rivals Auckland United.

=== Eastern ===
On 23 August 2025, Lorenz signed for Hong Kong Premier League club Eastern.

=== Gainare Tottori ===
On 29 June 2026, Gainare Tottori announced Lorenz had signed for the 2026–27 season.

== International career ==
Lorenz was first called up for the New Zealand U20's for the 2022 OFC U-19 Championship. He made his debut in the second group game against American Samoa on 10 September 2022.

== Personal life ==
Lorenz's grandparents were born in Hong Kong. He attended St Patrick's College

== Career statistics ==
=== Club ===
As of match played on 17 May 2026.

Appearances and goals by club, season and competition
Club	Season	League			National cup		Continental		Others		Total	
Club	Season	Division	Apps	Goals	Apps	Goals	Apps	Goals	Apps	Goals	Apps	Goals
Tasman United	2019–20	Championship	3	0	—		—		—		3	0
Wellington Olympic	2021	National League	9	0	0	0	—		—		9	0
Lower Hutt City	2021	National League	8	0	1	0	—		—		9	0
Wellington Phoenix Reserves	2021	National League	2	0	—		—		—		2	0
Wellington Phoenix Reserves	2022	National League	15	0	—		—		—		15	0
Wellington Phoenix Reserves	2023	National League	11	0	—		—		—		11	0
Wellington Phoenix Reserves	Total		28	0	0	0	—		—		28	0
Wellington Phoenix	2022–23	A-League Men	0	0	1	0	—		—		1	0
Schwarz-Weiß Rehden	2023–24	Oberliga Niedersachsen	0	0	0	0	—		—		0	0
Western Springs	2024	National League	13	1	2	0	—		—		15	1
Auckland City	2024	National League	12	0	0	0	—		—		12	0
Auckland United	2025	National League	11	0	0	0	—		—		11	0
Eastern	2025–26	Premier League	18	0	1	0	6 (Note: Appearances in AFC Champions League Two)	0	3 (Note: Two Appearances in Hong Kong Senior Shield, one appearance in Hong Kong League Cup)	0	28	0
Gainare Tottori	2026–27	J3 League	0	0	0	0	—		0	0	0	0
Career total			102	1	5	0	6	0	3	0	116	1

== Honours ==
Auckland City

- New Zealand National League: 2024

New Zealand U20

- OFC U-19 Championship: 2022
