= Ibrahim Kurban =

Chinese footballer (born 2001)

Personal information
- Full name: Ibrahim Kurban
- Date of birth: 28 February 2001 (age 25)
- Place of birth: Shule County, Xinjiang, China
- Height: 1.73 m (5 ft 8 in)
- Position: Left back

Team information
- Current team: Shijiazhuang Gongfu
- Number: 25

Senior career*
Years	Team	Apps	(Gls)
2020–2023	Xinjiang Tianshan Leopard	42	(1)
2023–2024	Kitchee	3	(0)
2025	Wenzhou FC	19	(0)
2025–	Shijiazhuang Gongfu	11	(1)
- * Club domestic league appearances and goals as of 10 March 2026

Ibrahim Kurban (Chinese: 伊卜拉伊木·库尔班; born 28 February 2001) is a Chinese professional footballer who plays as a left back and currently plays for Shijiazhuang Gongfu.

== Club career ==
On 12 July 2023, Ibrahim joined Hong Kong Premier League club Kitchee.

On 23 July 2025, Ibrahim joined China League One club Shijiazhuang Gongfu.

== Career statistics ==
=== Club ===
As of 17 August 2021.

Club	Season	League			Cup		Other		Total	
Club	Season	Division	Apps	Goals	Apps	Goals	Apps	Goals	Apps	Goals
Xinjiang Tianshan Leopard	2020	China League One	13	0	0	0	0	0	13	0
Xinjiang Tianshan Leopard	2021	China League One	6	0	0	0	0	0	6	0
Kitchee	2023–24	Hong Kong Premier League	3	0	7	0	0	0	10	0
Career total			22	0	7	0	0	0	29	0

== Honour ==
Kitchee

- Hong Kong Senior Challenge Shield: 2023–24
- HKPLC Cup: 2023–24
