= Sedin Ramić =

Bosnian footballer

Personal information
- Full name: Sedin Ramić
- Date of birth: 28 November 2000 (age 25)
- Place of birth: Sarajevo, Bosnia and Herzegovina
- Height: 1.90 m (6 ft 3 in)
- Position: Centre back

Team information
- Current team: Radnik Hadžići

Youth career
- –2019: Olimpik

Senior career*
| Years | Team | Apps | (Gls) |
| 2019–2021 | Olimpik | 11 | (0) |
| 2021–2023 | Radnik Hadžići | 87 | (1) |
| 2024 | Kitchee | 7 | (0) |
| 2024– | Radnik Hadžići | 0 | (0) |
- * Club domestic league appearances and goals as of 26 May 2024

Sedin Ramić (born 28 November 2000) is a Bosnian professional footballer who plays as a centre back and is currently playing for Radnik Hadžići.

== Club career ==
=== Olimpik Sarajevo ===
In January 2019, Ramić signed a contract with Bosnian club Olimpik.

=== Radnik Hadžići ===
On 19 February 2021, Ramić left Olimpik by mutual consent. He joined First League side Radnik Hadžići on 3 March, signing a contract until the end of season.

Ramić signed a new one-year contract with the club in July 2023. On 3 January 2024, his contract was terminated on a mutual consent, allowing him to leave the club on a free transfer.

=== Kitchee ===
On 16 January 2024, Ramić signed a contract with Hong Kong Premier League club Kitchee. Four days later, he played his first game for Kitchee in a 1–3 Sapling Cup group stage defeat against Crownity North District.

On 17 February 2024, he played his first league match for Kitchee in a 1–0 win against Biu Chun Rangers, when he was awarded the man of the match award.

== Career statistics ==
=== Club ===
As of match played 26 May 2024

Appearances and goals by club, season and competition
| Club | Season | League | | | National cup (Note: Appearance(s) in Bosnia and Herzegovina Football Cup) | | Other | | Total | |
| Club | Season | League | Apps | Goals | Apps | Goals | Apps | Goals | Apps | Goals |
|---|---|---|---|---|---|---|---|---|---|---|
| Olimpik | 2018–19 | First League of FBiH | 2 | 0 | 0 | 0 | — | | 2 | 0 |
| Olimpik | 2019–20 | First League of FBiH | 4 | 0 | 2 | 0 | — | | 6 | 0 |
| Olimpik | 2020–21 | Bosnian Premier League | 2 | 0 | 1 | 0 | — | | 13 | 5 |
| Olimpik | Total | | 8 | 0 | 3 | 0 | — | | 11 | 0 |
| Radnik Hadžići | 2020–21 | First League of FBiH | 14 | 0 | 0 | 0 | — | | 14 | 0 |
| Radnik Hadžići | 2021–22 | First League of FBiH | 29 | 0 | 0 | 0 | — | | 29 | 0 |
| Radnik Hadžići | 2022–23 | First League of FBiH | 28 | 0 | 0 | 0 | — | | 28 | 0 |
| Radnik Hadžići | 2023–24 | First League of FBiH | 15 | 1 | 1 | 0 | — | | 16 | 1 |
| Radnik Hadžići | Total | | 86 | 1 | 1 | 0 | — | | 87 | 1 |
| Kitchee | 2023–24 | Hong Kong Premier League | 7 | 0 | 1 | 0 | 4 (Note: Appearances in Hong Kong Sapling Cup) | 0 | 12 | 0 |
| Career total | | | 101 | 1 | 5 | 0 | 4 | 0 | 110 | 1 |

== Honours ==
Olimpik Sarajevo

- First League of FBiH: 2019–20
