= Gianni Cassaro =

Spanish footballer (born 1992)

Personal information
- Full name: Ian Cassaro Usart
- Date of birth: 10 April 1992 (age 34)
- Place of birth: Lloret de Mar, Spain
- Height: 1.92 m (6 ft 4 in)
- Position: Goalkeeper

Youth career
- 2008–2011: Lloret

Senior career*
Years	Team	Apps	(Gls)
2011–2014	Lloret	65	(0)
2014–2016	Olot	1	(0)
2015–2016	→ Europa (loan)	36	(0)
2016–2018	Peralada	49	(0)
2018–2019	Talavera	33	(0)
2019–2020	UCAM Murcia	5	(0)
2020–2021	Yeclano	25	(0)
2021–2023	Villarreal B	15	(0)
2023–2024	Murcia	8	(0)
2024–2025	Sabadell	32	(0)
2026	Eastern	7	(0)
- * Club domestic league appearances and goals as of 17 May 2026

Ian "Gianni" Cassaro Usart (born 10 April 1992) is a Spanish professional footballer who plays as a goalkeeper.

== Club career ==
Cassaro was born in Lloret de Mar, Girona, Catalonia, to an Italian father, and made his senior debut with hometown side CF Lloret in Primera Catalana in 2011. On 5 August 2014, he moved straight to Segunda División B after signing for UE Olot, but spent the campaign as a backup option.

On 19 June 2015, Cassaro was loaned to Tercera División side CE Europa, for one year. On 22 July 2016, he moved to Girona FC, being a third-choice of the main squad while playing for farm team CF Peralada in the third division.

On 1 June 2018, Cassaro agreed to a deal with CF Talavera de la Reina, still in the third division. On 26 June of the following year, after being a regular starter, he moved to fellow league team UCAM Murcia CF, but was only a second-choice behind Julio Iricibar.

On 20 August 2020, Cassaro signed for Yeclano Deportivo also in the division three, being an undisputed starter as his side suffered relegation. On 25 August 2021, he joined Villarreal CF's reserves in Primera Federación; an initial third-choice option to Iker Álvarez and Filip Jörgensen, he contributed with seven appearances during the campaign as his side achieved promotion to Segunda División.

On 22 June 2022, Cassaro renewed his contract with the Yellow Submarine for a further year. He made his professional debut at the age of 30 on 17 September, starting in a 3–1 home win over CD Lugo.

In July 2024, Cassaro joined Segunda Federación club CE Sabadell FC.

On 16 January 2026, Cassaro joined Hong Kong Premier League club Eastern.
