= Ho Ka Chi =

Hong Kong footballer

Personal information
- Full name: Ho Ka Chi
- Date of birth: 16 July 2002 (age 24)
- Place of birth: Hong Kong
- Height: 1.78 m (5 ft 10 in)
- Position: Midfielder

Youth career
- –2016: Wanchai
- 2016–2017: Kitchee
- 2017–2018: CFCSSHK
- 2018–2020: Pegasus

Senior career*
Years	Team	Apps	(Gls)
2020–2021	Pegasus	0	(0)
2021–2024	HK U23	26	(0)
2024–2025	HKFC	4	(0)
2025–2026	Eastern District	17	(0)

International career^{‡}
2019	Hong Kong U-19	4	(0)
- * Club domestic league appearances and goals as of 16 May 2026 ‡ National team caps and goals as of 22:44, 6 November 2021 (UTC)

Ho Ka Chi (Chinese: 何家智; born 16 July 2002) is a former Hong Kong professional footballer who played as a midfielder.

== Club career ==
On 20 October 2020, Ho joined Pegasus.

On 2 September 2021, Ho joined HK U23.

On 31 July 2024, Ho joined HKFC.

On 20 August 2025, Ho joined Eastern District.

== Career statistics ==
=== Club ===
As of 26 May 2024

Club	Season	League			National Cup		League Cup		Senior Shield		Total	
Club	Season	Division	Apps	Goals	Apps	Goals	Apps	Goals	Apps	Goals	Apps	Goals
Hong Kong Pegasus	2020–21	Hong Kong Premier League	0	0	0	0	5 (Note: Appearances in the Sapling Cup)	0	0	0	5	0
HK U23	2021–22	Hong Kong Premier League	4	0	0	0	4	0	0	0	8	0
HK U23	2022–23	Hong Kong Premier League	6	0	0	0	2	1	0	0	8	1
HK U23	2023–24	Hong Kong Premier League	16	0	1	0	7	2	1	0	25	2
Career total			26	0	1	0	18	3	1	0	46	3
