= Kim Jeong-hoon (footballer) =

South Korean footballer

Personal information
- Full name: Kim Jeong-hoon
- Date of birth: 23 December 1991 (age 34)
- Place of birth: South Korea
- Height: 1.75 m (5 ft 9 in)
- Position: Midfielder

Team information
- Current team: Chungju Hummel
- Number: 14

Youth career
- 2010–2013: Kwandong University

Senior career*
Years	Team	Apps	(Gls)
2014–2016	Chungju Hummel	80	(4)
2017	Pyeongtaek Citizen		
2018–2019	Icheon Citizen		
2020	Pyeongtaek Citizen		
2021	Cheongju FC		
2022	Gimhae 2008		
2023–	Gwelup Croatia		
- * Club domestic league appearances and goals as of 1 December 2016

Kim Jeong-hoon (Korean: 김정훈; born 23 December 1991) is a South Korean footballer who played as midfielder for Chungju Hummel in K League Challenge.

== Career ==
He was selected by Chungju Hummel in 2014 K League draft. He made his professional debut in the league match against Suwon FC on 29 March 2014.
