= Chang Kwong Yin =

Hong Kong footballer

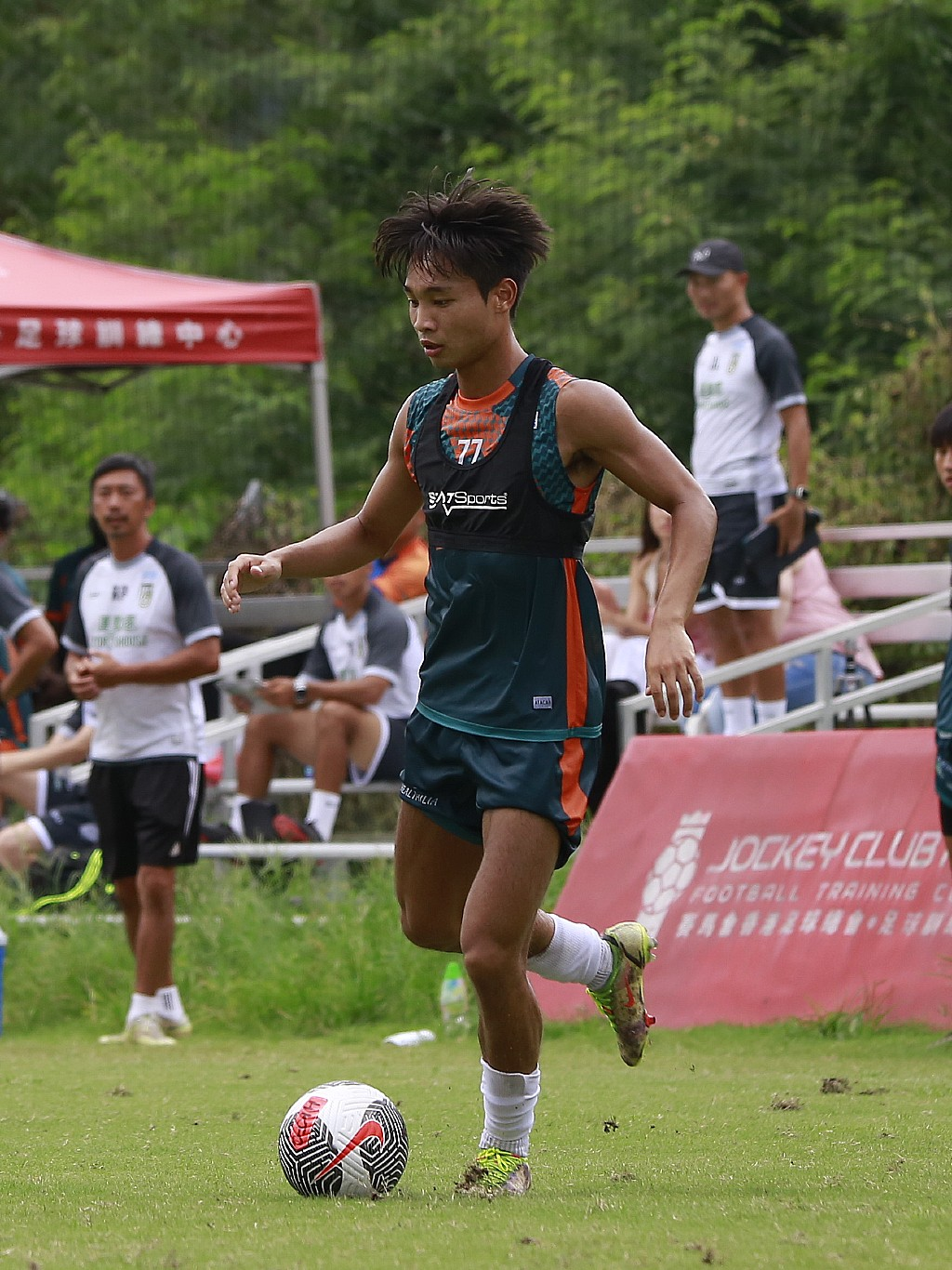

Personal information
- Full name: Chang Kwong Yin
- Date of birth: 24 February 2002 (age 24)
- Place of birth: Hong Kong
- Height: 1.75 m (5 ft 9 in)
- Position: Right winger

Youth career
- –2019: Kitchee

Senior career*
| Years | Team | Apps | (Gls) |
| 2019–2024 | Kitchee | 1 | (0) |
| 2023–2024 | → Sham Shui Po (loan) | 20 | (0) |
| 2024–2025 | Rangers (HKG) | 18 | (1) |
| 2025–2026 | Eastern | 15 | (0) |
| 2026– | Sham Shui Po | 0 | (0) |

International career^{‡}
| 2019 | Hong Kong U-19 | 9 | (1) |
- * Club domestic league appearances and goals as of 17 May 2026 ‡ National team caps and goals as of 22:44, 19 December 2021 (UTC)

Chang Kwong Yin (Chinese: 張廣然; born 24 February 2002) is a Hong Kong footballer who plays as a right winger for Hong Kong First Division League club Sham Shui Po.

== Club career ==
On 4 July 2023, Chang was loaned to Sham Shui Po for a season.

On 22 July 2024, Chang joined Rangers.

On 19 July 2025, Chang joined Eastern.

== Career statistics ==
=== Club ===
As of 30 October 2021

| Club | Season | League | | | National Cup | | League Cup | | Other | | Total | |
| Club | Season | Division | Apps | Goals | Apps | Goals | Apps | Goals | Apps | Goals | Apps | Goals |
|---|---|---|---|---|---|---|---|---|---|---|---|---|
| Kitchee | 2021–22 | Hong Kong Premier League | 1 | 0 | 0 | 0 | 7 (Note: Appearances in the Hong Kong Sapling Cup) | 1 | 0 | 0 | 8 | 1 |
| Career total | | | 1 | 0 | 0 | 0 | 7 | 1 | 0 | 0 | 8 | 1 |
