= 2018–19 Hong Kong Premier League =

Hong Kong Premier League
- Season: 2018–19
- Dates: 31 August 2018 – 18 May 2019
- Champions: Tai Po
- Relegated: Dreams FC; Hoi King
- AFC Champions League: Tai Po
- AFC Cup: Kitchee
- Matches: 90
- Goals: 330 (3.67 per match)
- Top goalscorer: (Brazil) Lucas Silva (Kitchee) (12 goals) (Spain) Manuel Bleda (Eastern) (12 goals)
- Best goalkeeper: Tse Tak Him (Southern)
- Biggest home win: Kitchee 8–1 Hoi King (4 November 2018)
- Biggest away win: Dreams FC 0–6 Kitchee (9 March 2019); Southern 1–7 Yuen Long (19 May 2019)
- Highest scoring: Kitchee 8–1 Hoi King (4 November 2018)
- Longest winning run: 8 matches Tai Po
- Longest unbeaten run: 14 matches Tai Po
- Longest winless run: 12 matches Lee Man
- Longest losing run: 6 matches Hoi King
- Highest attendance: 3,489; Kitchee 1–1 Eastern (25 September 2018)
- Lowest attendance: 99 (China) R&F 3–0 Hoi King (28 April 2019)
- Total attendance: 84,265
- Average attendance: 936

The 2018–19 Hong Kong Premier League (also known as the BOC Life Hong Kong Premier League for sponsorship reasons) was the 5th season of the Hong Kong Premier League, the top division of Hong Kong football.

Tai Po won their first top flight title in club history. They are the third different team to win the Hong Kong Premier League and the first district team to win a top flight title since Yuen Long during the 1962–63 season.

== Teams ==
A total of 10 teams contest the league, including nine sides from the 2017–18 Hong Kong Premier League and one promoted from the 2017–18 Hong Kong First Division.

=== Stadia and locations ===
Location of R&F.
Locations of the Hong Kong Premier League 2018–19 teams

Primary venues used in the Hong Kong Premier League:

Kitchee Pegasus	Tai Po	Eastern
Mong Kok Stadium	Tai Po Sports Ground	Hong Kong Stadium
Capacity: 6,769	Capacity: 3,200	Capacity: 40,000
Southern	Yuen Long	(China) R&F
Aberdeen Sports Ground	Yuen Long Stadium	Yanzigang Stadium
Capacity: 4,000^{1}	Capacity: 5,000	Capacity: 1,000^{2}
Lee Man	Dreams FC	Hoi King
Tseung Kwan O Sports Ground	Tsing Yi Sports Ground	Sham Shui Po Sports Ground
Capacity: 3,500	Capacity: 1,500	Capacity: 2,194

Remarks:
^{1}The capacity of Aberdeen Sports Ground is artificially reduced from 9,000 to 4,000 as only the main stand is opened for football matches.
^{2}The capacity of Yanzigang Stadium is artificially reduced from 2,000 to 1,000.

=== Personnel and kits ===
Team	Chairman	Head coach	Captain	Kit manufacturer	Kit sponsor
Dreams FC	Leung Chi Kui	Leung Chi Wing	Chan Wai Ho	Kelme	SDRE
Eastern	Peter Leung	(Latvia) Andrejs Štolcers	Leung Chun Pong	Adidas	Topeast
Hoi King	Lo King Yau	Fung Hoi Man	Chan Man Chun	Kelme	
Kitchee	Ken Ng	Chu Chi Kwong	Huang Yang	Nike	edps
Pegasus	Canny Leung	Chan Ho Yin	Chan Siu Ki	Adidas	
Lee Man	Norman Lee	Chan Hiu Ming	(Spain) Fran González	Adidas	Lee & Man Chemical
Southern	Chan Man Chun	Cheng Siu Chung	Leung Tsz Chun	Macron	Isuzu
Tai Po	Gary Choy	Lee Chi Kin	Wong Wai	Nike	Sun Mobile
Yuen Long	Wong Wai Shun	Kwok Kar Lok	Fábio Lopes	Kelme	
(China) R&F	(China) Huang Shenghua	Yeung Ching Kwong	Roberto	Ucan	R&F Properties

=== Managerial changes ===
Team	Outgoing manager	Manner of departure	Date of vacancy	Position in table	Incoming manager	Date of appointment
Eastern	Lee Kin Wo	Return as Coach	14 May 2018	Pre-season	Chan Yuen Ting	19 July 2018
Lee Man	Fung Hoi Man	Signed by Hoi King	21 May 2018	Pre-season	Chan Hiu Ming	21 May 2018
Yuen Long	Tsang Chiu Tat	Signed by Lee Man	21 May 2018	Pre-season	Kwok Kar Lok	4 June 2018
(China) R&F	(United States) Bito Wu	Return to Guangzhou R&F	3 June 2018	Pre-season	Yeung Ching Kwong	14 June 2018
Pegasus	Yeung Ching Kwong	Signed by R&F	14 June 2018	Pre-season	(Spain) Pedro García	2 July 2018
Pegasus	(Spain) Pedro García	Sacked	30 September 2018	8th	Chan Ho Yin	30 September 2018
Eastern	Chan Yuen Ting	Resigned	4 February 2019	2nd	Wong Chun Yue	4 February 2019
Eastern	Wong Chun Yue	Role of caretaker ended	14 February 2019	2nd	(Latvia) Andrejs Štolcers	14 February 2019

=== Foreign players ===
The number of foreign players is restricted to six (including one Asian player) per team, with no more than four on pitch during matches. R&F are allowed to register a maximum of 3 foreigners at any one time.

Club	Player 1	Player 2	Player 3	Player 4	Player 5	Asian Player	Former Players
Dreams FC	(Argentina) Jonathan Acosta	(Brazil) Diego Higino	(Spain) Pablo Gallardo	(Spain) Gondra	(Spain) Nacho Martínez	(Japan) Kota Kawase	(South Korea) Yoon Dong-hun (Spain) Joaquín
Eastern	(Brazil) Everton	(Brazil) Diego Eli	(Brazil) Robson	(Portugal) Lima Pereira	(Spain) Manuel Bleda		(Japan) Yusuke Igawa (Spain) José Ángel
Hoi King	(Brazil) Paulo César	(Brazil) Robert	(Brazil) Zé Victor	(South Korea) Bae Chan-soo	(South Korea) Kim Jin-seo	(South Korea) Kim Min-ki	(South Korea) Kim Dong-jin (South Korea) Seo Sang-min
Pegasus	(Brazil) Juninho	(Brazil) David Lazari	(Bulgaria) Rosen Kolev	(Cameroon) Mahama Awal	(Japan) Shu Sasaki		(Brazil) João Emir (Australia) Travis Major
Kitchee	(Brazil) Fernando	(Brazil) Lucas Silva	(Croatia) Josip Tadić	(Hungary) Krisztián Vadócz	(United States) Jonathan Hernandez	(Australia) Matt Smith	(Brazil) Robert (Mali) Mohamed Sissoko (South Korea) Kim Bong-jin (South Korea) Seo Sang-min
Lee Man	(Brazil) Stefan	(Chinese Taipei) Chen Ting-yang	(France) Michaël N'dri	(South Korea) Baek Ji-hoon	(Spain) Fran González	(Ukraine) Serhiy Shapoval	(Brazil) Alexandre Talento (Brazil) Zé Victor (Netherlands) Crescendo van Berkel
Southern	(Brazil) Dhiego Martins	(Brazil) Ticão	(Brazil) Wellingsson	(Serbia) Nikola Komazec	(Serbia) Marko Krasić	(Pakistan) Zesh Rehman	
Tai Po	(Brazil) Dudu	(Brazil) João Emir	(Brazil) Michel Lugo	(Brazil) Eduardo Praes	(Brazil) Igor Sartori	(Australia) Harry Sawyer	(Brazil) David Lazari
Yuen Long	(Brazil) Cleiton	(Brazil) Kessi	(Brazil) Jean Moser	(Brazil) Tomas		(Chinese Taipei) Wang Ruei	
(China) R&F	(Brazil) Leonço	(Ivory Coast) Serges Déblé	(Croatia) Saša Novaković	—N/a	—N/a	—N/a	

== League table ==
Pos	Team	Pld	W	D	L	GF	GA	GD	Pts	Qualification or relegation
1	Tai Po (C)	18	12	5	1	43	22	+21	41	Qualification for AFC Champions League preliminary round 2 (Note: If the league champions cannot qualify for the AFC Champions League group stage, they will enter the AFC Cup group stage.)
2	(China) R&F (Note: R&F are not a full member of the Hong Kong Football Association and are not eligible to represent Hong Kong in the AFC club competitions.)	18	11	3	4	51	26	+25	36	
3	Southern	18	9	5	4	30	24	+6	32 (Note: Head-to head results for teams with 32 points: Southern 4 points; Kitchee 1 point.)	
4	Kitchee	18	9	5	4	44	20	+24	32	Qualification for AFC Cup play-off round (Note: Kitchee qualified for the AFC Cup play-off round as Hong Kong FA Cup winners.)
5	Eastern	18	8	7	3	38	21	+17	31	
6	Pegasus	18	6	4	8	34	33	+1	22	
7	Yuen Long	18	4	6	8	36	37	−1	18	
8	Dreams FC (R)	18	4	4	10	29	53	−24	16	Relegation to Hong Kong First Division League (Note: Dreams FC announced on 11 July 2019 that they would self-relegate due to lack of funds.)
9	Lee Man	18	2	5	11	12	36	−24	11	
10	Hoi King (R)	18	2	2	14	13	58	−45	8	Relegation to Hong Kong First Division League

Source: Hong Kong Football Association
Rules for classification: 1) Points; 2) Head-to-head points; 3) Head-to-head goal difference; 4) Head-to-head goals scored; 5) Goal difference; 6) Goals scored; 7) Fair-play points; 8) Drawing lots (Play-off if the winner has to be decided).
(C) Champions; (R) Relegated

== Positions by round ==
To preserve chronological evolvements, any postponed matches are not included to the round at which they were originally scheduled, but added to the full round they were played immediately afterwards. For example, if a match is scheduled for round 7, but then played between rounds 8 and 9, it will be added to the standings for round 8.

Team ╲ Round	1	2	3	4	5	6	7	8	9	10	11	12	13	14	15	16	17	18
Tai Po	5	3	2	6	7	6	5	5	4	5	3	3	2	1	1	1	1	1
R&F	7	7	6	3	3	3	1	2	1	1	1	1	1	3	3	2	2	2
Southern	2	1	1	1	1	2	3	4	3	3	2	2	3	2	4	4	3	3
Kitchee	3	5	3	7	6	5	4	3	5	4	5	4	4	4	2	3	4	4
Eastern	4	6	4	2	2	1	2	1	2	2	4	5	5	5	5	5	5	5
Pegasus	1	4	8	4	4	4	6	6	6	6	6	6	6	6	6	6	6	6
Yuen Long	5	2	5	5	5	7	7	7	7	7	7	8	7	7	7	7	8	7
Dreams FC	10	10	9	9	9	9	9	9	9	9	8	7	8	8	8	8	7	8
Lee Man	9	9	7	8	8	8	8	8	8	8	9	9	9	9	9	9	9	9
Hoi King	8	8	10	10	10	10	10	10	10	10	10	10	10	10	10	10	10	10

Leader - 2020 AFC Champions League
Relegation to 2019–20 Hong Kong First Division

Source: Hong Kong Football Association website

== Fixtures and results ==
=== Round 1 ===
31 August 2018	Lee Man	0–2	Kitchee	Tseung Kwan O, New Territories
20:00 (UTC+8)		Report	Fernando 8'; Nakamura 90+5'	Stadium: Tseung Kwan O Sports Ground; Attendance: 1,952; Referee: Tam Ping Wun

1 September 2018	Dreams FC	1–4	Pegasus	Tsing Yi, New Territories
17:30 (UTC+8)	Higino 33'	Report	Joao Emir 28' (pen.) Major 44', 76' Sasaki 90'	Stadium: Tsing Yi Sports Ground; Attendance: 702; Referee: Ho Wai Sing

2 September 2018	Yuen Long	4–4	Tai Po	Yuen Long, New Territories
14:30 (UTC+8)	Moser 8'; Chan Kwong Ho 13'; Tomas 51'; Ekwegwo 80'	Report	Chan Siu Kwan 10'; Dudu 49'; Sartori 71'; Lugo 82'	Stadium: Yuen Long Stadium; Attendance: 1,174; Referee: Ng Chiu-kok

2 September 2018	Eastern	3–2	(China) R&F	So Kon Po, Hong Kong Island
17:30 (UTC+8)	Everton 48'; Bleda 90'; José Ángel 90+4'	Report	Leung Nok Hang 33'; Leonço 56'	Stadium: Hong Kong Stadium; Attendance: 1,734; Referee: Liu Kwok Man

8 September 2018	Southern	3–1	Hoi King	Aberdeen, Hong Kong Island
14:30 (UTC+8)	Wellingsson 41'; Sham Kwok Fai 58'; Komazec 65'	Report	Annan 56'	Stadium: Aberdeen Sports Ground; Attendance: 630; Referee: Tang Hing-fu

=== Round 2 ===
14 September 2018	Dreams FC	0–2	Southern	Tsing Yi, New Territories
20:00 (UTC+8)		Report	Ha 74'; Dhiego Martins 87'	Stadium: Tsing Yi Sports Ground; Attendance: 645; Referee: Liu Kwok Man

15 September 2018	Tai Po	4–3	Pegasus	Tai Po, New Territories
14:30 (UTC+8)	Lee Ka Yiu 6'; Eduardo 8'; Sartori 53'; Chung Wai Keung 71'	Report	Sasaki 62'; Eduardo 66' (og.); Awal 72'	Stadium: Tai Po Sports Ground; Attendance: 1,007; Referee: Lau Fong-hei

15 September 2018	Lee Man	0–2	Yuen Long	Tseung Kwan O, New Territories
17:30 (UTC+8)		Report	Moser 20'; Chan Kwong Ho 50'	Stadium: Tseung Kwan O Sports Ground; Attendance: 530; Referee: Luk Kin-sun

21 November 2018	Kitchee	1–3	(China) R&F	Mong Kok, Kowloon
20:00 (UTC+8)	Fernando 8'	Report	Leung Nok Hang 23' 76'; Itaparica 58'	Stadium: Mong Kok Stadium; Attendance: 1,557; Referee: Yu Kin Fung

2 January 2019	Eastern	6–0	Hoi King	So Kon Po, Hong Kong Island
20:00 (UTC+8)	Bleda 27', 57'; Diego Eli 40'; Everton 61'; Lau Ho Lam 65'; Clayton 83'	Report		Stadium: Hong Kong Stadium; Attendance: 626; Referee: Lau Fong Hei

=== Round 3 ===
25 September 2018	Dreams FC	2–2	Tai Po	Tsing Yi, New Territories
14:30 (UTC+8)	Martínez 48'; Peng Lin Lin 88'	Report	Sartori 40'; Wong Wai 74'	Stadium: Tsing Yi Sports Ground; Attendance: 773; Referee: Luk Kin Sun

25 September 2018	Kitchee	1–1	Eastern	Mong Kok, Kowloon
17:30 (UTC+8)	Tadić 87'	Report	Bleda 63'	Stadium: Mong Kok Stadium; Attendance: 3,489; Referee: Ng Chiu Kok

29 September 2018	(China) R&F	4–2	Pegasus	Guangzhou, China
14:30 (UTC+8)	Giovane 33'; Leonço 46'; Itaparica 67'; Itaparica 71'		João Emir 53'; Liu Pui Fung 60'	Stadium: Yanzigang Stadium; Attendance: 730; Referee: Tong Kui Sum

30 September 2018	Hoi King	0–1	Lee Man	Sham Shui Po, Kowloon
14:30 (UTC+8)		Report	Stefan 29'	Stadium: Sham Shui Po Sports Ground; Attendance: 804; Referee: Lau Fong Hei

30 September 2018	Yuen Long	1–2	Southern	Yuen Long, New Territories
17:30 (UTC+8)	Tomas 50'	Report	Dhiego Martins 43' 65'	Stadium: Yuen Long Stadium; Attendance: 1,100; Referee: Tam Ping Wun

=== Round 4 ===
5 October 2018	Pegasus	4–0	Lee Man	Mong Kok, Kowloon
20:00 (UTC+8)	Major 9' Juninho 47'; Liu Pui Fung 49' van Berkel 82' (o.g.)	Report		Stadium: Mong Kok Stadium; Attendance: 851; Referee: Luk Kin Sun

6 October 2018	Southern	1–0	Tai Po	Mong Kok, Kowloon
14:30 (UTC+8)	Ha 90+6'	Report		Stadium: Mong Kok Stadium; Attendance: 1,246; Referee: Liu Kwok Man

6 October 2018	Eastern	4–0	Dreams FC	So Kon Po, Hong Kong Island
17:30 (UTC+8)	Bleda 8' 32' 45'; Tse Long Hin 89'	Report		Stadium: Hong Kong Stadium; Attendance: 1,028; Referee: Ng Chiu Kok

7 October 2018	Hoi King	0–5	(China) R&F	Sham Shui Po, Kowloon
14:30 (UTC+8)		Report	Lam 30' 60' Itaparica 58'; Giovane 82' Tan Chun Lok 90+3'	Stadium: Sham Shui Po Sports Ground; Attendance: 511; Referee: Tang Hing Fu

7 October 2018	Yuen Long	2–2	Kitchee	Yuen Long, New Territories
17:30 (UTC+8)	Chan Hiu Fung 60'; Fernando 32'	Report	Lucas Silva 11'; Kessi 90+2'	Stadium: Yuen Long Stadium; Attendance: 1,401; Referee: Lau Fong Hei

=== Round 5 ===
20 October 2018	(China) R&F	2–1	Lee Man	Guangzhou, China
14:30 (UTC+8)	Novaković 40'; Bai He 49'	Report	Leong Ka Hang 54'	Stadium: Yanzigang Stadium; Attendance: 740; Referee: Ho Wai Sing

20 October 2018	Southern	0–2	Eastern	Mong Kok, Kowloon
14:30 (UTC+8)		Report	Bleda 52'; José Ángel 87'	Stadium: Mong Kok Stadium; Attendance: 1,786; Referee: Tam Ping Wun

20 October 2018	Yuen Long	5–1	Dreams FC	Yuen Long, New Territories
17:30 (UTC+8)	Moser 20' 69'; Yip Tsz Chun 59'; Chan Kwong Ho 75'; Cleiton 90+2'	Report	Martínez 71' (pen.)	Stadium: Yuen Long Stadium; Attendance: 939; Referee: Tong Kui Sum

21 October 2018	Hoi King	2–6	Pegasus	Sham Shui Po, Kowloon
14:30 (UTC+8)	Annan 1' 8'	Report	Juninho 6'; Liu Pui Fung 28'; Sasaki 40' 85'; Major 48' 68'	Stadium: Sham Shui Po Sports Ground; Attendance: 444; Referee: Liu Kwok Man

21 October 2018	Kitchee	2–2	Tai Po	Mong Kok, Kowloon
17:30 (UTC+8)	Kim Bong-jin 13'; Tadić 28'	Report	Sawyer 72'; Dudu 75'	Stadium: Mong Kok Stadium; Attendance: 2,053; Referee: Yu Kin Fung

=== Round 6 ===
31 October 2018	Eastern	3–2	Yuen Long	So Kon Po, Hong Kong Island
20:00 (UTC+8)	Everton 8' 66'; Bleda 71'	Report	Chan Hiu Fung 26'; Chan Kwong Ho 76'	Stadium: Hong Kong Stadium; Attendance: 898; Referee: Luk Kin Sun

3 November 2018	Lee Man	2–2	Dreams FC	Tseung Kwan O, New Territories
14:30 (UTC+8)	Leong Ka Hang 37' 58'	Report	Gondra 56'; Yoon Dong-hun 85'	Stadium: Tseung Kwan O Sports Ground; Attendance: 525; Referee: Lau Fong Hei

3 November 2018	Pegasus	1–1	Southern	Mong Kok, Kowloon
17:30 (UTC+8)	Chan Siu Ki 86'	Report	Krasić 11'	Stadium: Mong Kok Stadium; Attendance: 1,295; Referee: Yu Kin Fung

4 November 2018	Tai Po	3–1	(China) R&F	Tai Po, New Territories
14:30 (UTC+8)	Dudu 25'; Sawyer 60'; Lugo 68'	Report	Novaković 87'	Stadium: Tai Po Sports Ground; Attendance: 1,105; Referee: Tong Kui Sum

4 November 2018	Kitchee	8–1	Hoi King	Mong Kok, Kowloon
17:30 (UTC+8)	Lucas Silva 51' 70'; Cheng Chin Lung 57'; Robert 73' 76' 90+2'; Jordi 84'; Lum 87'	Report	Bae Chan-soo 68'	Stadium: Mong Kok Stadium; Attendance: 1,038; Referee: Tam Ping Wun

=== Round 7 ===
30 November 2018	Kitchee	3–0	Pegasus	Mong Kok, Kowloon
20:00 (UTC+8)	Tadić 39'; Lucas Silva 51'; Vadócz 90+6'	Report		Stadium: Mong Kok Stadium; Attendance: 1,641; Referee: Liu Kwok Man

1 December 2018	(China) R&F	5–2	Yuen Long	Guangzhou, China
14:30 (UTC+8)	Leonço 41' (pen.); Giovane 45+1'; Itaparica 63'; Lam 77' 86'	Report	Cleiton 7' (pen.); Law Chun Ting 84'	Stadium: Yanzigang Stadium; Attendance: 729; Referee: Yu Kin Fung

1 December 2018	Lee Man	1–1	Southern	Tseung Kwan O, New Territories
14:30 (UTC+8)	Fran González 8'	Report	Ha 54'	Stadium: Tseung Kwan O Sports Ground; Attendance: 595; Referee: Lau Fong Hei

2 December 2018	Dreams FC	4–3	Hoi King	Tsing Yi, New Territories
14:30 (UTC+8)	To 18' (o.g.); Martínez 38'; Higino 67' 89'	Report	Tsang Tsz Hin 29'; Annan 33'; Seo Sang-min 90+1'	Stadium: Tsing Yi Sports Ground; Attendance: 691; Referee: Tong Kui Sum

2 December 2018	Eastern	0–0	Tai Po	So Kon Po, Hong Kong Island
17:30 (UTC+8)		Report		Stadium: Hong Kong Stadium; Attendance: 1,237; Referee: Luk Kin Sun

=== Round 8 ===
8 December 2018	(China) R&F	1–1	Southern	Guangzhou, China
14:30 (UTC+8)	Lau Hok Ming 18' (o.g.)	Report	Dhiego Martins 28'	Stadium: Yanzigang Stadium; Attendance: 781; Referee: Tang Hing Fu

8 December 2018	Tai Po	2–1	Lee Man	Tai Po, New Territories
14:30 (UTC+8)	Chan Siu Kwan 6' 34'	Report	Baek Ji-hoon 50'	Stadium: Tai Po Sports Ground; Attendance: 653; Referee: Tam Ping Wun

8 December 2018	Eastern	1–2	Pegasus	So Kon Po, Hong Kong Island
17:30 (UTC+8)	Everton 71'	Report	Major 12'; Sasaki 90'	Stadium: Hong Kong Stadium; Attendance: 1,084; Referee: Ng Chiu Kok

9 December 2018	Hoi King	0–0	Yuen Long	Sham Shui Po, Kowloon
14:30 (UTC+8)		Report		Stadium: Sham Shui Po Sports Ground; Attendance: 483; Referee: Liu Kwok Man

29 December 2018	Kitchee	5–0	Dreams FC	Mong Kok, Kowloon
14:30 (UTC+8)	Tadić 36'; Ju Yingzhi 45', 58'; Lucas Silva 49', 77'	Report		Stadium: Mong Kok Stadium; Attendance: 1,457; Referee: Ho Wai Sing

=== Round 9 ===
12 January 2019	(China) R&F	6–0	Dreams FC	Guangzhou, China
14:30 (UTC+8)	Lam 12'; Leonço 18', 59'; Tse 68'; Giovane 74', 90'	Report		Stadium: Yanzigang Stadium; Attendance: 754; Referee: Luk Kin Sun

12 January 2019	Southern	2–0	Kitchee	Aberdeen, Hong Kong Island
14:30 (UTC+8)	Dhiego Martins 19'; Ha 37'	Report		Stadium: Aberdeen Sports Ground; Attendance: 1,184; Referee: Tam Ping Wun

13 January 2019	Tai Po	3–0	Hoi King	Tai Po, New Territories
14:30 (UTC+8)	Lugo 15'; Chan Siu Kwan 38'; Sawyer 82'	Report		Stadium: Tai Po Sports Ground; Attendance: 798; Referee: Yu Kin Fung

13 January 2019	Pegasus	1–1	Yuen Long	Mong Kok, Kowloon
17:30 (UTC+8)	Major 90+6'	Report	Chan Kwong Ho 89'	Stadium: Mong Kok Stadium; Attendance: 1,123; Referee: Ng Chiu Kok

15 January 2019	Eastern	0–0	Lee Man	So Kon Po, Hong Kong Island
20:00 (UTC+8)		Report		Stadium: Hong Kong Stadium; Attendance: 811; Referee: Lau Fong Hei

=== Round 10 ===
19 January 2019	(China) R&F	1–1	Eastern	Guangzhou, China
14:30 (UTC+8)	Leonço 51'	Report	Lam Ka Wai 72'	Stadium: Yanzigang Stadium; Attendance: 788; Referee: Tam Ping Wun

19 January 2019	Tai Po	2–2	Yuen Long	Tai Po, New Territories
14:30 (UTC+8)	Wong Wai 30'; Sawyer 36'	Report	Wang Ruei 47'; Ekwegwo 84'	Stadium: Tai Po Sports Ground; Attendance: 910; Referee: Ho Wai Sing

19 January 2019	Pegasus	1–1	Dreams FC	Mong Kok, Kowloon
17:30 (UTC+8)	Major 37'	Report	Gondra 50'	Stadium: Mong Kok Stadium; Attendance: 742; Referee: Ng Chiu Kok

20 January 2019	Hoi King	1–0	Southern	Sham Shui Po, Kowloon
14:30 (UTC+8)	Robert 75'	Report		Stadium: Sham Shui Po Sports Ground; Attendance: 605; Referee: Luk Kin Sun

20 January 2019	Kitchee	3–0	Lee Man	Mong Kok, Kowloon
17:30 (UTC+8)	Lum 42'; Lucas Silva 79'; Fernando 87'	Report		Stadium: Mong Kok Stadium; Attendance: 1,591; Referee: Yu Kin Fung

=== Round 11 ===
15 February 2019	Pegasus	2–0	Hoi King	Mong Kok, Kowloon
20:00 (UTC+8)	Major 28'; Lazari 66'	Report		Stadium: Mong Kok Stadium; Attendance: 537; Referee: Ho Wai Sing

16 February 2019	Tai Po	3–0	Kitchee	Tai Po, New Territories
14:30 (UTC+8)	Sandro 2', 62'; Satori 90' (pen.)	Report		Stadium: Tai Po Sports Ground; Attendance: 1,753; Referee: Liu Kwok Man

16 February 2019	Lee Man	1–3	(China) R&F	Tseung Kwan O, New Territories
17:30 (UTC+8)	Cheng Siu Kwan 88'	Report	Novaković 6'; Leonço 45+2'; Déblé 81'	Stadium: Tseung Kwan O Sports Ground; Attendance: 462; Referee: Luk Kin Sun

17 February 2019	Dreams FC	4–1	Yuen Long	Tsing Yi, New Territories
14:30 (UTC+8)	Gondra 26', 49' (pen.), 65'; Acosta 82'	Report	Chan Kwong Ho 36'	Stadium: Tsing Yi Sports Ground; Attendance: 602; Referee: Tam Ping Wun

17 February 2019	Eastern	1–4	Southern	So Kon Po, Hong Kong Island
17:30 (UTC+8)	Everton 14'	Report	Ha 22', 54', 68'; Wellingsson 40'	Stadium: Hong Kong Stadium; Attendance: 979; Referee: Ng Chiu Kok

=== Round 12 ===
23 February 2019	Tai Po	2–1	Eastern	Tai Po, New Territories
14:30 (UTC+8)	Lugo 55'; Eduardo 8'	Report	Clayton 2'	Stadium: Tai Po Sports Ground; Attendance: 1,213; Referee: Ho Wai Sing

23 February 2019	Southern	3–1	Lee Man	Aberdeen, Hong Kong Island
14:30 (UTC+8)	Krasić 10'; Lau Hok Ming 44'; Wellingsson 72'	Report	Fong Pak Lun 90+5'	Stadium: Aberdeen Sports Ground; Attendance: 358; Referee: Tam Ping Wun

23 February 2019	Pegasus	0–3	Kitchee	Mong Kok, Kowloon
17:30 (UTC+8)		Report	Lucas Silva 31'; Ju Yingzhi 45'; Benhaddouche 46'	Stadium: Mong Kok Stadium; Attendance: 1,278; Referee: Yu Kin Fung

24 February 2019	Hoi King	1–4	Dreams FC	Sham Shui Po, Kowloon
14:30 (UTC+8)	Annan 2' (pen.) 90+6'	Report	Chan Wai Ho 3'; Martínez 86'; Pang Chiu Yin 90+1'; Acosta	Stadium: Sham Shui Po Sports Ground; Attendance: 650; Referee: Liu Kwok Man

24 February 2019	Yuen Long	0–1	(China) R&F	Yuen Long, New Territories
17:30 (UTC+8)		Report	Lo Kwan Yee 68'	Stadium: Yuen Long Stadium; Attendance: 970; Referee: Luk Kin Sun

=== Round 13 ===
2 March 2019	Pegasus	2–2	Eastern	Mong Kok, Kowloon
20:00 (UTC+8)	Juninho 63'; Yuen Chun Sing 89'	Report	McKee 26'; Lam Ka Wai 77'	Stadium: Mong Kok Stadium; Attendance: 1,022; Referee: Tam Ping Wun

9 March 2019	Southern	3–3	(China) R&F	Aberdeen, Hong Kong Island
14:30 (UTC+8)	Komazec 30', 55' (pen.); Lau Hok Ming 90+2'	Report	Leonço 5'; Giovane 8'; Roberto 67'	Stadium: Aberdeen Sports Ground; Attendance: 985; Referee: Lau Fong Hei

9 March 2019	Dreams FC	0–6	Kitchee	Tsing Yi, New Territories
17:30 (UTC+8)		Report	Vadócz 28', 89'; Fernando 34'; Lucas Silva 63'; Nakamura 83'; Tadić 86'	Stadium: Tsing Yi Sports Ground; Attendance: 856; Referee: Tam Ping Wun

9 March 2019	Lee Man	0–2	Tai Po	Tseung Kwan O, New Territories
20:00 (UTC+8)	(yellow card) 40' (yellow-red card) 45+1' Hoon	Report	Chan Siu Kwan 33'; Sartori 66'	Stadium: Tseung Kwan O Sports Ground; Attendance: 317; Referee: Luk Kin Sun

10 March 2019	Yuen Long	2–1	Hoi King	Yuen Long, New Territories
14:30 (UTC+8)	Moser 32'; Fabio 89'	Report	Sun Ming Him 48'	Stadium: Yuen Long Stadium; Attendance: 656; Referee: Ho Wai Sing

=== Round 14 ===
16 March 2019	(China) R&F	2–3	Kitchee	Guangzhou, China
14:30 (UTC+8)	Giovane 65', 68'	Report	Fernando 22'; Ju Yingzhi 57'; Lucas Silva 73'	Stadium: Yanzigang Stadium; Attendance: 805; Referee: Luk Kin Sun

16 March 2019	Southern	1–0	Dreams FC	Aberdeen, Hong Kong Island
14:30 (UTC+8)	Wellingsson 85'	Report		Stadium: Aberdeen Sports Ground; Attendance: 500; Referee: Tam Ping Wun

16 March 2019	Pegasus	1–2	Tai Po	Mong Kok, Kowloon
17:30 (UTC+8)	Rosen 25'	Report	Sartori 65'; Lee Ka Ho 73'	Stadium: Mong Kok Stadium; Attendance: 1,283; Referee: Liu Kwok Man

17 March 2019	Hoi King	0–5	Eastern	Sham Shui Po, Kowloon
14:30 (UTC+8)		Report	Everton 6'; Bleda 38', 66', 70'; Lima 63'	Stadium: Sham Shui Po Sports Ground; Attendance: 539; Referee: Ng Chiu Kok

17 March 2019	Yuen Long	2–2	Lee Man	Yuen Long, New Territories
17:30 (UTC+8)	Moser 20'; Ekwegwo 80'	Report	N'dri 3'; Stefan 89'	Stadium: Yuen Long Stadium; Attendance: 713; Referee: Ho Wai Sang

=== Round 15 ===
5 April 2019	Lee Man	0–0	Eastern	Tseung Kwan O, New Territories
17:30 (UTC+8)		Report		Stadium: Tseung Kwan O Sports Ground; Attendance: 630; Referee: Yu Kin Fung

6 April 2019	Dreams FC	1–5	(China) R&F	Tsing Yi, New Territories
14:30 (UTC+8)	Gallardo 35'	Report	Nuñez 21'; Leonço 29', 79', 88'; Giovane 36'	Stadium: Tsing Yi Sports Ground; Attendance: 579; Referee: Liu Kwok Man

7 April 2019	Hoi King	1–5	Tai Po	Sham Shui Po, Kowloon
14:30 (UTC+8)	Kim Min-ki 11' (pen.)	Report	Lugo 5', 26'; Sartori 7'; Chan Siu Kwan 69'; Sandro 77'	Stadium: Sham Shui Po Sports Ground; Attendance: 635; Referee: Tam Ping Wun

7 April 2019	Yuen Long	0–1	Pegasus	Yuen Long, New Territories
17:30 (UTC+8)		Report	Sasaki 84' (pen.)	Stadium: Yuen Long Stadium; Attendance: 728; Referee: Ho Wai Sing

8 April 2019	Kitchee	1–1	Southern	Mong Kok, Kowloon
20:00 (UTC+8)	Tong Kin Man 10'	Report	Beto 45+1'	Stadium: Mong Kok Stadium; Attendance: 1,896; Referee: Ng Wai Hong

=== Round 16 ===
23 March 2019	Kitchee	3–0	Yuen Long	Mong Kok, Kowloon
17:30 (UTC+8)	Lucas Silva 21'; Fernando 43', 74'	Report		Stadium: Mong Kok Stadium; Attendance: 1,155; Referee: Hing Fu Tang

20 April 2019	Lee Man	2–1	Pegasus	Tseung Kwan O, New Territories
14:30 (UTC+8)	Shapoval 36'; Yuen Chun Sing 56' (o.g.)	Report	Yuen Chun Sing 9'	Stadium: Tseung Kwan O Sports Ground; Attendance: 368; Referee: Ho Wai Sing

21 April 2019	Tai Po	2–1	Southern	Tai Po, New Territories
14:30 (UTC+8)	Lugo 38'; Sartori 90'	Report	Komazec 52' (pen.)	Stadium: Tai Po Sports Ground; Attendance: 1965; Referee: Tam Ping Wun

21 April 2019	Dreams FC	2–2	Eastern	Tsing Yi, New Territories
17:30 (UTC+8)	Kawase 57', 63'	Report	Lam Ka Wai 24'; Everton 76'	Stadium: Tsing Yi Sports Ground; Attendance: 514; Referee: Law Bik Chi

28 April 2019	(China) R&F	3–0	Hoi King	Guangzhou, China
14:30 (UTC+8)	Déblé 65'; Tan Chun Lok 71'; Giovane 80'	Report		Stadium: Yanzigang Stadium; Attendance: 99; Referee: Tam Ping Wun

=== Round 17 ===
4 May 2019	(China) R&F	1–2	Tai Po	Guangzhou, China
14:30 (UTC+8)	Déblé 38'	Report	Sandro 78', 86'	Stadium: Yanzigang Stadium; Attendance: 939; Referee: Luk Kin Sun

4 May 2019	Southern	3–1	Pegasus	Aberdeen, Hong Kong Island
14:30 (UTC+8)	Wellingsson 10'; Spitz 37'; Komazec 90+1'	Report	Lazari 30'	Stadium: Aberdeen Sports Ground; Attendance: 432; Referee: Yu Kin Fung

4 May 2019	Hoi King	1–1	Kitchee	Sham Shui Po, Kowloon
17:30 (UTC+8)	Kim Min-ki 7'	Report	Jordi 86'	Stadium: Sham Shui Po Sports Ground; Attendance: 579; Referee: Ho Wai Sing

5 May 2019	Yuen Long	3–4	Eastern	Yuen Long, New Territories
14:30 (UTC+8)	Tomas 49'; Chan Kwong Ho 51'; Moser 71'	Report	Everton 33', 56'; Xu Deshuai 40'; Robson 45+1'	Stadium: Yuen Long Stadium; Attendance: 732; Referee: Tam Ping Wun

5 May 2019	Dreams FC	6–0	Lee Man	Tsing Yi, New Territories
17:30 (UTC+8)	Gondra 24', 81'; Jordan Lam 35'; Chen Ting-yang 62' (o.g.); Martínez 81'; Higino 83'	Report		Stadium: Tsing Yi Sports Ground; Attendance: 364; Referee: Wong Wai Lun

=== Round 18 ===
19 May 2019	Southern	1–7	Yuen Long	Aberdeen, Hong Kong Island
14:30 (UTC+8)	Kessi 39' (o.g.)	Report	Moser 3', 90+2'; Cheung Kin Fung 18'; Tomas 27'; Ekwegwo 34'; Yim Kai Wa 41'; Law Chun Ting 89'	Stadium: Aberdeen Sports Ground; Attendance: 321; Referee: Wong Wai Lun

19 May 2019	Pegasus	2–3	(China) R&F	Mong Kok, Kowloon
14:30 (UTC+8)	Sasaki 11' (pen.); Cheung Chi Yung 39'	Report	Déblé 17'; Tse 36'; Giovane 70'	Stadium: Mong Kok Stadium; Attendance: 564; Referee: Tam Ping Wun

19 May 2019	Eastern	2–0	Kitchee	So Kon Po, Hong Kong Island
14:30 (UTC+8)	Lee Hong Lim 45'; Robson 69'	Report		Stadium: Hong Kong Stadium; Attendance: 965; Referee: Ng Chiu Kok

19 May 2019	Tai Po	3–1	Dreams FC	Tai Po, New Territories
14:30 (UTC+8)	Fung Hing Wa 9'; Eduardo 77'; Sandro 90+2'	Report	Gondra 44'	Stadium: Tai Po Sports Ground; Attendance: 2,088; Referee: Law Bik Chi

19 May 2019	Lee Man	0–1	Hoi King	Tseung Kwan O, New Territories
14:30 (UTC+8)		Report	Lew Wai Yip 54'	Stadium: Tseung Kwan O Sports Ground; Attendance: 264; Referee: Wong Kei Hoi

== Season Statistics ==
=== Top scorers ===
Rank	Player	Club	Goals
1	(Brazil) Lucas Silva	Kitchee	12
1	(Spain) Manolo Bleda	Eastern	12
3	(Brazil) Tiago Leonço	R&F	11
3	Giovane	R&F	11
5	(Brazil) Everton Camargo	Eastern	10
6	(Australia) Travis Major	Pegasus	9
6	(Brazil) Jean Moser	Yuen Long	9
8	(Brazil) Igor Sartori	Tai Po	8
8	(Spain) Marcos Gondra Krug	Dreams FC	8
10	James Ha	Southern	7
10	(Brazil) Fernando	Kitchee	7
10	(Brazil) Michel Lugo	Tai Po	7
10	Chan Kwong Ho	Yuen Long	7
10	(Japan) Shu Sasaki	Pegasus	7

As of matches played 19 May 2019

==== Hat-tricks ====
Note: The results column shows the scorer's team score first. Teams in bold are home teams.

#	Player	Nationality	For	Against	Result	Date	Ref
1	Manolo Bleda	Spain	**Eastern**	Dreams FC	4–0	6 October 2018	
2	Robert	Brazil	**Kitchee**	Hoi King	8–1	4 November 2018	
3	Krug	Spain	**Dreams FC**	Yuen Long	4–1	17 February 2019	
4	James Ha	Hong Kong	Southern	**Eastern**	4–1	17 February 2019	
5	Manolo Bleda	Spain	Eastern	**Hoi King**	5–0	17 March 2019	
6	Leonço	Brazil	(China) R&F	**Dreams FC**	5–1	6 April 2019	

== Attendances ==
Pos	Team	Total	High	Low	Average	Change
1	Kitchee	15,877	3,489	1,038	1,764	−17.4%
2	Tai Po	11,492	2,088	653	1,277	+34.3%
3	Eastern	9,362	1,734	626	1,040	−31.2%
4	Pegasus	8,695	1,295	537	966	+16.4%
5	Yuen Long	8,413	1,401	656	935	−17.2%
6	Southern	7,442	1,786	321	827	+67.7%
7	R&F	6,365	939	99	707	−11.3%
8	Dreams FC	5,726	856	364	636	−14.6%
9	Lee Man	5,643	1,952	264	627	+23.2%
10	Hoi King	5,250	804	444	583	n/a^{1}
	League total	84,265	3,489	99	936	−2.1%

Source: HKFA
Notes:
1: Team did not play in the Premier League last season

== Hong Kong Top Footballer Awards ==
Awards	Prize Winner	Club	Votes
Footballer of the Year	(Brazil) Igor Sartori	Tai Po	85.82%
Women's Footballer of the Year	(Hong Kong) Wong Shuk Fan	Happy Valley (Women)	8
Coach of the Year	(Hong Kong) Lee Chi Kin	Tai Po	67.17%
Young Players of the Year	(Hong Kong) Wu Chun Ming	Pegasus	29.01%
Young Players of the Year	(Hong Kong) Cheng Siu Kwan	Lee Man	28.27%
Players' Player	(Brazil) Igor Sartori	Tai Po	64
Most Favorite Player	(Brazil) Igor Sartori	Tai Po	3,709
Hong Kong Top Footballers
Goalkeeper	(Hong Kong) Tse Tak Him	Southern	55.81%
Defenders	(Brazil) Eduardo Praes	Tai Po	51.91%
Defenders	(Hong Kong) Leung Nok Hang	(China) R&F	51.17%
Defenders	(Hong Kong) Fung Hing Wa	Tai Po	48.87%
Defenders	(Brazil) Fábio	Yuen Long	38.97%
Midfielders	(Hong Kong) Chan Siu Kwan	Tai Po	53.16%
Midfielders	(Hong Kong) Wong Wai	Tai Po	43.49%
Midfielders	(Hong Kong) James Ha	Southern	40.96%
Midfielders	(Brazil) Fernando	Kitchee	35.90%
Forwards	(Brazil) Igor Sartori	Tai Po	85.82%
Forwards	(Brazil) Lucas Silva	Kitchee	43.59%
