= 2019–20 Eastern SC season =

Eastern 2019–20 season
- President: Lam Kin Ming
- Head Coach: Lee Chi Kin
- Stadium: Tseung Kwan O Sports Ground
- Premier League: 2nd
- Senior Shield: Champion
- FA Cup: Champion
- Sapling Cup: Group Stage
- Highest home attendance: 893 (vs Tai Po, 29 September 2019)
- Lowest home attendance: 731 (vs Southern, 20 October 2019)
Home colours	Away colours

The 2019–20 season is Eastern's 65th season in the top-tier division in Hong Kong football. Eastern will compete in the Premier League, Senior Challenge Shield, FA Cup and Sapling Cup this season.

== Squad ==
=== First Team ===
As of 1 June 2020

Note: Flags indicate national team as defined under FIFA eligibility rules; some limited exceptions apply. Players may hold more than one non-FIFA nationality.

No.	Pos.	Nation	Player
1	GK	HKG	Yapp Hung Fai
3	MF	HKG	Diego Eli
5	DF	HKG	Clayton
6	DF	HKG	Chak Ting Fung
8	MF	HKG	Lee Ka Yiu
9	FW	BRA	Lucas Silva ^{FP}
10	FW	HKG	Sandro
11	FW	BRA	Everton ^{FP}
13	DF	HKG	Lee Ka Ho
15	DF	HKG	Fung Hing Wa
16	MF	HKG	Leung Chun Pong (captain)
17	MF	HKG	Leung Kwun Chung
19	FW	HKG	Hirokane Harima

No.	Pos.	Nation	Player
22	MF	HKG	Wu Chun Ming
23	MF	HKG	Wong Wai
26	GK	HKG	Liu Fu Yuen
27	FW	TPE	Chen Hao-wei ^{FP}
29	MF	HKG	Oliver Laxton
30	DF	HKG	Wong Tsz Ho
33	DF	BRA	Eduardo Praes ^{FP}
34	DF	HKG	Chan Ching Him
42	MF	HKG	Yue Tze Nam
77	MF	HKG	Naveed Khan
80	FW	HKG	Chung Wai Keung
88	MF	BRA	João Emir ^{FP}
99	GK	HKG	Tsang Man Fai

Remarks:
^{FP} These players are registered as foreign players.
^{LP} These players are registered as local players in Hong Kong domestic football competitions.

== Transfers ==
=== Transfers in ===
Date from	Position	Nationality	Name	From	Fee	Ref.
1 July 2019	DF	(Hong Kong)	Tsang Chi Hau	Pegasus	End of loan	
17 July 2019	GK	(Hong Kong)	Tsang Man Fai	Tai Po	Free	
17 July 2019	DF	(Hong Kong)	Chak Ting Fung	Tai Po	Free	
17 July 2019	DF	(Hong Kong)	Lee Ka Ho	Tai Po	Free	
17 July 2019	DF	(Hong Kong)	Fung Hing Wa	Tai Po	Free	
17 July 2019	DF	(Brazil)	Eduardo Praes	Tai Po	Free	
17 July 2019	DF	(Hong Kong)	Lau Hok Ming	Southern	Free	
17 July 2019	MF	(Hong Kong)	Lee Ka Yiu	Tai Po	Free	
17 July 2019	MF	(Hong Kong)	Leung Kwun Chung	Tai Po	Free	
17 July 2019	MF	(Brazil)	João Emir	Tai Po	Free	
17 July 2019	MF	(Hong Kong)	Wu Chun Ming	Pegasus	Free	
17 July 2019	MF	(Hong Kong)	Oliver Laxton	HKFC	Free	
17 July 2019	MF	(Hong Kong)	Yue Tze Nam	(Portugal) Cova da Piedade	Free	
17 July 2019	FW	(Hong Kong)	Chung Wai Keung	Tai Po	Free	
17 July 2019	FW	(Hong Kong)	Harima Hirokane	Kitchee	Free	
17 July 2019	FW	(Chinese Taipei)	Chen Hao-wei	(Chinese Taipei) Hang Yuan	Free	
17 July 2019	FW	(Brazil)	Jean Moser	Yuen Long	Free	
28 September 2019	MF	(Hong Kong)	Wong Wai	Tai Po	Free	
1 January 2020	FW	(Hong Kong)	Sandro	Tai Po	Free	
1 January 2020	FW	(Brazil)	Lucas Silva	Kitchee	Free	
1 July 2020	FW	(Brazil)	Fernando	Kitchee	Free	
1 July 2020	DF	(England) (Sweden) (Hong Kong)	Alex Jojo	Happy Valley	Free	
1 July 2020	MF	(Hong Kong)	Cheng Tsz Sum	Tai Po	Free	
6 July 2020	MF	(Hong Kong)	Toby Down	Tai Po	Free	

=== Transfers out ===
Date from	Position	Nationality	Name	To	Fee	Ref.
1 July 2019	GK	(Hong Kong)	Liang Yuhao		Released	
1 July 2019	GK	(Hong Kong)	Ho Kwok Chuen	Resources Capital	Released	
1 July 2019	DF	(Hong Kong)	Cheung Kin Fung	Retired	–	
1 July 2019	DF	(Portugal)	Lima Pereira	(Portugal) Cova da Piedade	End of loan	
1 July 2019	MF	(Brazil)	Robson Shimabuku	(Portugal) Cova da Piedade	End of loan	
1 July 2019	MF	(Hong Kong)	Lee Hong Lim	Lee Man	Released	
1 July 2019	MF	(Philippines) (Hong Kong)	Jordan Jarvis	Resources Capital	Released	
1 July 2019	FW	(Spain)	Manolo Bleda	Kitchee	Released	
1 July 2019	FW	(Hong Kong)	Jaimes Mckee	Retired	–	
13 January 2020	MF	(Hong Kong)	Lam Ka Wai	R&F	Released	
1 June 2020	MF	(Hong Kong)	Xu Deshuai		Released	
1 June 2020	DF	(Hong Kong)	Tsang Kam To	Lee Man	Released	
1 June 2020	FW	(Hong Kong)	Lam Hok Hei		Released	
1 June 2020	DF	(Hong Kong)	Tsang Chi Hau	Happy Valley	Released	
1 June 2020	MF	(Hong Kong)	Lau Ho Lam	Southern	Released	
1 July 2020	DF	(Hong Kong)	Fung Hing Wa	R&F	Released	
1 July 2020	DF	(Hong Kong)	Chan Ching Him	Resources Capital	Released	
1 July 2020	DF	(Hong Kong)	Lee Ka Ho		Released	
1 July 2020	DF	(Hong Kong)	Tse Long Hin		Released	
1 July 2020	MF	(Hong Kong)	Yiu Ho Ming	Rangers	Released	
1 July 2020	FW	(Brazil)	Jean Moser		Released	

=== Loans out ===
Start Date	End Date	Position	Nationality	Name	To Club	Fee	Ref.
2 July 2019	31 May 2020	MF	(Hong Kong)	Lau Ho Lam	Southern	Undisclosed	
19 July 2019	31 May 2020	DF	(Hong Kong)	Tse Long Hin	Lee Man	Undisclosed	
26 July 2019	13 January 2020	MF	(Hong Kong)	Yiu Ho Ming	Pegasus	Undisclosed	
August 2019	31 May 2020	DF	(Hong Kong)	Tsang Chi Hau	Yuen Long	Undisclosed	
1 September 2019	31 May 2020	DF	(Hong Kong)	Lau Hok Ming	Lee Man	Undisclosed	
5 September 2019	31 May 2020	DF	(Hong Kong)	Cheng King Ho	Yuen Long	Undisclosed	
23 September 2019	31 May 2020	FW	(Hong Kong)	Lam Hok Hei	Rangers	Undisclosed	
2 January 2020	31 May 2020	FW	(Brazil)	Jean Moser	Pegasus	Undisclosed	
15 January 2020	31 May 2020	MF	(Hong Kong)	Yiu Ho Ming	Yuen Long	Undisclosed	

== Club officials ==
Position	Staff
Head coach	(Hong Kong) Lee Chi Kin
Technical Director	(Latvia) Andrejs Štolcers
Assistant coach	(Hong Kong) Li Hang Wui
Assistant coach	(Hong Kong) Lo Chi Kwan
Goalkeeping coach	(Brazil) Ricardo Navarro
Technical Analyst	(Brazil) Bruno Pereira

== Competitions ==
=== Hong Kong Premier League ===
==== Table ====
Pos	Team	Pld	W	D	L	GF	GA	GD	Pts	Qualification or relegation
1	Kitchee (C)	10	6	2	2	25	10	+15	20	Qualification for AFC Champions League group stage
2	Eastern	10	6	1	3	16	8	+8	19	Qualification for AFC Cup group stage
3	(China) R&F (D)	10	5	3	2	21	15	+6	18	Withdrew from league system, club folded (Note: R&F withdrew from the league system after the end of the season and folded.)
4	Lee Man	10	5	1	4	16	14	+2	16	Qualification for AFC Cup group stage
5	Southern	10	2	4	4	15	21	−6	10	

Source: Hong Kong Football Association
Rules for classification: 1) Points; 2) Head-to-head points; 3) Head-to-head goal difference; 4) Head-to-head goals scored; 5) Goal difference; 6) Goals scored; 7) Fair-play points; 8) Drawing lots (Play-off if the winner has to be decided).
(C) Champions; (D) Disqualified
Notes:

Win Draw Loss

=== Hong Kong Sapling Cup ===
==== Group stage ====
Pos	Team	Pld	W	D	L	GF	GA	GD	Pts	Qualification
1	Kitchee (A)	8	6	1	1	20	6	+14	19	Advance to Final
2	Eastern	8	5	1	2	14	5	+9	16	
3	Pegasus	8	4	0	4	19	20	−1	12	
4	Lee Man	8	2	1	5	17	22	−5	7	
5	Rangers	8	1	1	6	10	27	−17	4	

Source: Hong Kong Football Association
Rules for classification: 1) Points; 2) Head-to-head points; 3) Head-to-head goal difference; 4) Goal difference; 5) Goals scored.
(A) Advance to a further round
