= Lee Chi Kin =

Hong Kong football manager

Personal information
- Full name: Lee Chi Kin
- Date of birth: 27 December 1967 (age 58)
- Place of birth: Hong Kong
- Height: 1.72 m (5 ft 8 in)

Team information
- Current team: Tai Po (head coach)

Managerial career
- Years: Team
- 2008–2012: Sham Shui Po
- 2012–2015: Yokohama FC Hong Kong
- 2015–2016: Pegasus
- 2016–2019: Tai Po
- 2019–2021: Eastern
- 2021–2022: Eastern (football director)
- 2023–: Tai Po

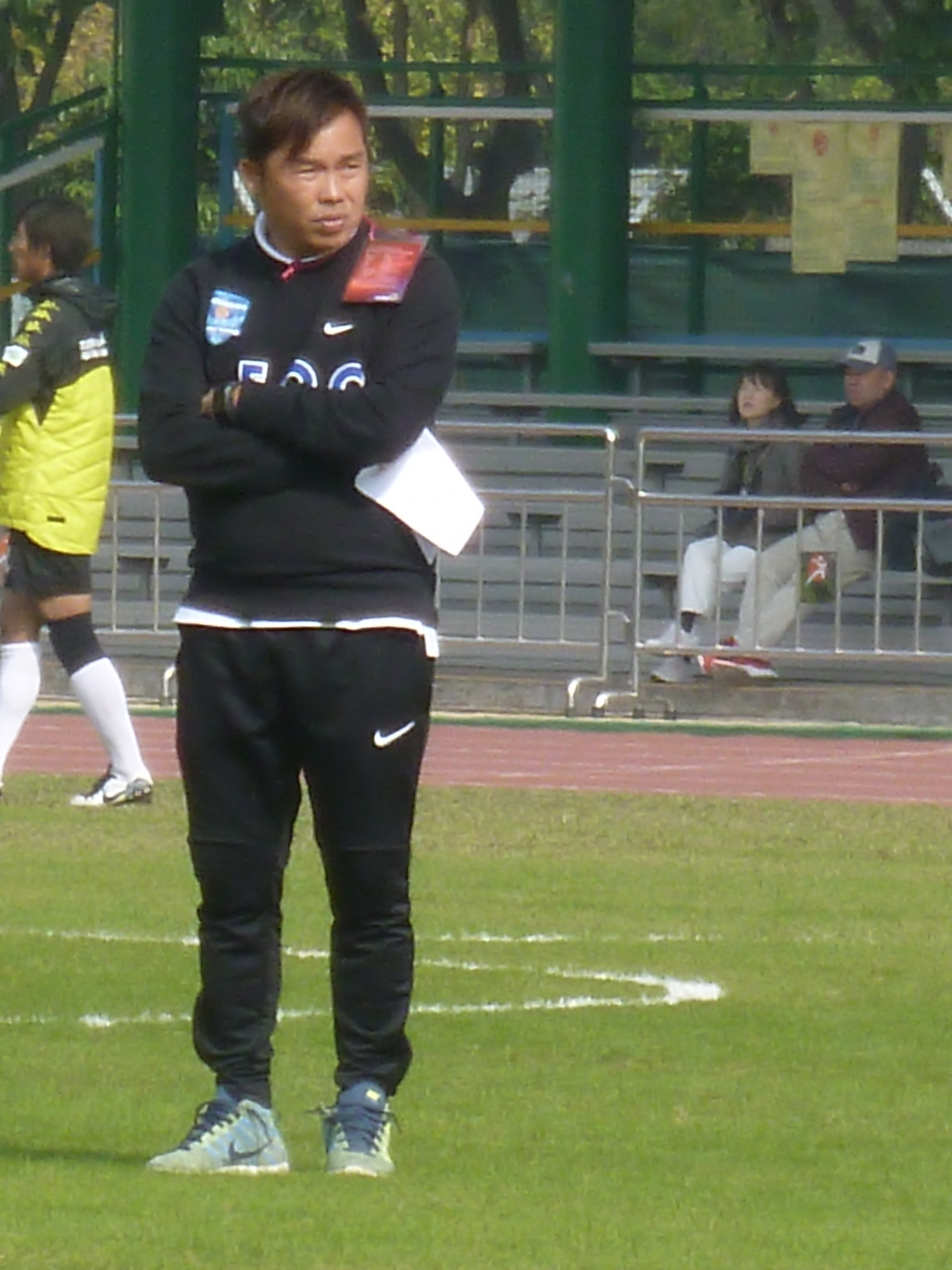
Lee Chi Kin at a Tuen Min vs Yokohama FC game in 2013

Lee Chi Kin (Chinese: 李志堅, born 27 December 1967) is a Hong Kong football manager. He is the current head coach of Hong Kong Premier League club Tai Po.

== Managerial career ==
=== Yokohama FC Hong Kong and Pegasus ===
He won the Hong Kong Coach of the Year award in 2015 as manager of Yokohama FC Hong Kong.

He moved to Pegasus during the subsequent offseason where he was manager for 20 months before being terminated in April 2016.

=== Tai Po ===
Lee Chi Kin joined Tai Po in June 2016. He worked quickly to bring on board players whom he had worked with during previous coaching stints including Yuen Chun Sing, Wong Wai, Lee Ka Yiu, Tan Chun Lok, and Fung Hing Wa.

During his first season, he led Tai Po to 6th place in the Premier League, their best finish at that point in club history. The following season, he led the club to a runners-up finishing, better the result from the previous season.

In 2018–19, Lee led Tai Po to their first Hong Kong Premier League title in club history, becoming the first district club to win a top flight title since 1963. For this achievement, he was named the 2019 Hong Kong Coach of the Year.

At the end of the season, Lee announced that he would mutually part ways with Tai Po as the club faced budget clubs due to reduced sponsorship.

=== Eastern ===
On 3 July 2019, Lee left Tai Po to join Eastern.

In his first season, the club won the 2019–20 Senior Shield and the 2019–20 Hong Kong FA Cup.

=== Tai Po ===
On 21 June 2023, Lee returned to Tai Po after 4 years.

== Managerial statistics ==
As of match played 1 February 2026

Managerial record by team and tenure
Team	Nat.	From	To	Record								Ref.
Team	Nat.	From	To	G	W	D	L	GF	GA	GD	Win %	Ref.
Sham Shui Po	(Hong Kong)	1 July 2008	30 June 2012	47	19	8	20	76	67	+9	40.43	
Yokohama FC Hong Kong	(Hong Kong)	1 July 2012	30 June 2015	66	17	18	31	86	125	−39	25.76	
Pegasus	(Hong Kong)	1 July 2015	10 April 2016	23	9	7	7	30	25	+5	39.13	
Tai Po	(Hong Kong)	4 July 2016	30 June 2019	91	50	18	23	178	117	+61	54.95	
Eastern	(Hong Kong)	17 July 2019	28 May 2021	53	36	8	9	119	45	+74	67.92	
Tai Po	(Hong Kong)	21 June 2023	Present	90	52	18	20	191	116	+75	57.78	
Career Total				370	183	77	110	680	495	+185	49.46	

== Honours ==
=== Head coach ===
Pegasus

- Hong Kong FA Cup: 2015–16
- Hong Kong Sapling Cup: 2015–16

Eastern

- Hong Kong FA Cup: 2019–20
- Hong Kong Senior Shield: 2019–20
- Hong Kong Sapling Cup: 2020–21

Tai Po

- Hong Kong Premier League: 2018–19, 2024–25
- Hong Kong FA Cup: 2025–26
- Hong Kong Senior Shield: 2025–26
- Hong Kong Sapling Cup: 2016–17

=== Individual ===
- Hong Kong Coach of the Year: 2015, 2019
