= The Cross Straits, Hong Kong & Macau Football Competition for the Youth =

The Cross Straits, Hong Kong & Macau Football Competition for the Youth (Chinese: 兩岸暨港澳青少年足球賽) is an annual football competition co-organised by the Chinese Football Association, the Hong Kong Football Association, the Macau Football Association and the Chinese Taipei Football Association. It was first organized in 2011 in Wuhan, Hubei. Each year the four football associations will compete with each other in a chosen host city. The tournament is organised for under-16 group.

== Past Results ==
Year	Host city	Champion	First Runner-up	Second Runner-up
2011	(China) Wuhan	China PR	(China) Hubei	Chinese Taipei
2012	Hong Kong	Hong Kong	China PR	Chinese Taipei
