= 2016–17 Hong Kong Sapling Cup =

Tournament details
- Country: Hong Kong; China
- Dates: 23 November 2016 – 3 May 2017
- Teams: 11

Final positions
- Champions: Tai Po (1st title)
- Runners-up: Pegasus

Tournament statistics
- Matches played: 10
- Goals scored: 36 (3.6 per match)
- Attendance: 8,472 (847 per match)
- All statistics correct as of 3 May 2017.

2016–17 Hong Kong Sapling Cup (officially the 2016–17 R&F Properties Sapling Cup for sponsorship reasons) was the 2nd edition of the Sapling Cup. The Cup is contested by the 9 teams in the 2016–17 Hong Kong Premier League.

The objective of the Cup was to create more potential playing opportunities for youth players. In this Cup competition, each team must play a minimum of two players born on or after 1 January 1995 (U22) and six foreign players at most during every whole match, or send at most four foreign players during every whole match.

Tai Po won the title on 3 May 2017.

== Calendar ==
Stage	Date	Matches	Clubs
First Round	23 November 2016 – 18 January 2017	3	11 → 8
Quarter-finals	11 – 12 February 2017	4	8 → 4
Semi-finals	10 – 11 March 2017	2	4 → 2
Final	3 May 2017 at Mong Kok Stadium	1	2 → 1

== Results ==
=== First round ===
18 January 2017 M01	Tai Po	1–0	Kitchee	Tsing Yi, Hong Kong
20:00 UTC+8	Lucas 51'	Report		Stadium: Tsing Yi Sports Ground; Attendance: 344; Referee: Luk Kin Sun

23 November 2016 M02	HKFC	0–2	Southern	Siu Sai Wan, Hong Kong
14:30 UTC+8		Report	Ha 23'; Dhiego 52'	Stadium: Siu Sai Wan Sports Ground; Attendance: 80; Referee: Ho Wai Sing

30 November 2016 M03	Yuen Long	1–3	Biu Chun Glory Sky	Siu Sai Wan, Hong Kong
20:00 UTC+8	Pang Chiu Yin 45+3'	Report	Yeung Chi Lun 19'; Everton 71', 72'	Stadium: Siu Sai Wan Sports Ground; Attendance: 85; Referee: Luk Kin Sun

=== Quarter-finals ===
11 February 2017 M04	South China	1–4	Tai Po	Mong Kok, Hong Kong
14:30 UTC+8	Tse 18'	Report	Lucas 10'; Dudu 25'; Itaparica 66'; Tan Chun Lok 85'	Stadium: Mong Kok Stadium; Attendance: 1,192; Referee: Tong Kui Sum

11 February 2017 M05	Rangers	2–4	Southern	Tsing Yi, Hong Kong
17:30 UTC+8	Clayton 28'; Hui Ka Lok 119'	Report	Lau Hok Ming 82'; Wellingsson 97'; Dieguito 103'; Ha 118'	Stadium: Tsing Yi Sports Ground; Attendance: 322; Referee: Liu Kwok Man

12 February 2017 M06	Eastern	7–1	(China) R&F	Mong Kok, Hong Kong
14:30 UTC+8	Lugo 23', 56', 84'; Giovane 38', 61'; Cheng Siu Wai 72'; Li Ka Chun 75'	Report	Zhong Ke 51'	Stadium: Mong Kok Stadium; Attendance: 955; Referee: Luk Kin Sun

12 February 2017 M07	Pegasus	0–0 (a.e.t.) (4–3 p)	Biu Chun Glory Sky	Tsing Yi, Hong Kong
17:30 UTC+8		Report		Stadium: Tsing Yi Sports Ground; Attendance: 372; Referee: Tong Kui Sum
	Penalties
	Emir (penalty scored); Eduardo (penalty scored); Dhiego (penalty missed); Siu Chun Ming (penalty scored); Major (penalty scored)		(penalty missed) Everton; (penalty missed) Teodorović; (penalty scored) Liu Pui Fung; (penalty scored) Yoon Dong-hun; (penalty scored) Miović

=== Semi-finals ===
10 March 2017 M08	Pegasus	2–1	Eastern	Mong Kok, Hong Kong
20:00 UTC+8	Major 72', 120'	Report	Giovane 65'	Stadium: Mong Kok Stadium; Attendance: 930; Referee: Tong Kui Sum

11 March 2017 M09	Southern	0–3	Tai Po	Mong Kok, Hong Kong
15:00 UTC+8		Report	Tan Chun Lok 45+3'; Lucas 67', 84'	Stadium: Mong Kok Stadium; Attendance: 1,236; Referee: Luk Kin Sun

=== Final ===
3 May 2017 M10	Tai Po	2–1 (a.e.t.)	Pegasus	Mong Kok, Hong Kong
15:00 UTC+8	Lucas 75'; Lima 105'	Report	Chan Siu Ki 45+2'	Stadium: Mong Kok Stadium; Attendance: 2,956; Referee: Luk Kin Sun
