= Fung Hing Wa =

Hong Kong footballer

Fung Hing Wa 馮慶燁
Personal information
- Full name: Fung Hing Wa
- Date of birth: 12 December 1992 (age 33)
- Place of birth: Hong Kong
- Height: 1.86 m (6 ft 1 in)
- Position: Centre back

Senior career*
Years	Team	Apps	(Gls)
2008–2012	Sham Shui Po	33	(3)
2012–2015	YFCMD	6	(0)
2015–2016	Pegasus	6	(0)
2016–2019	Tai Po	34	(3)
2019–2020	Eastern	7	(1)
2020	R&F	0	(0)
2020–2022	Eastern	23	(2)
2022–2024	Lee Man	11	(0)

International career^{‡}
2012–2014	Hong Kong U23		
2019–2022	Hong Kong	9	(0)
- * Club domestic league appearances and goals as of 26 May 2024 ‡ National team caps and goals as of 24 September 2022

Fung Hing Wa (Chinese: 馮慶燁, born 12 December 1992) is a former Hong Kong professional footballer who played as a centre back.

== Club career ==
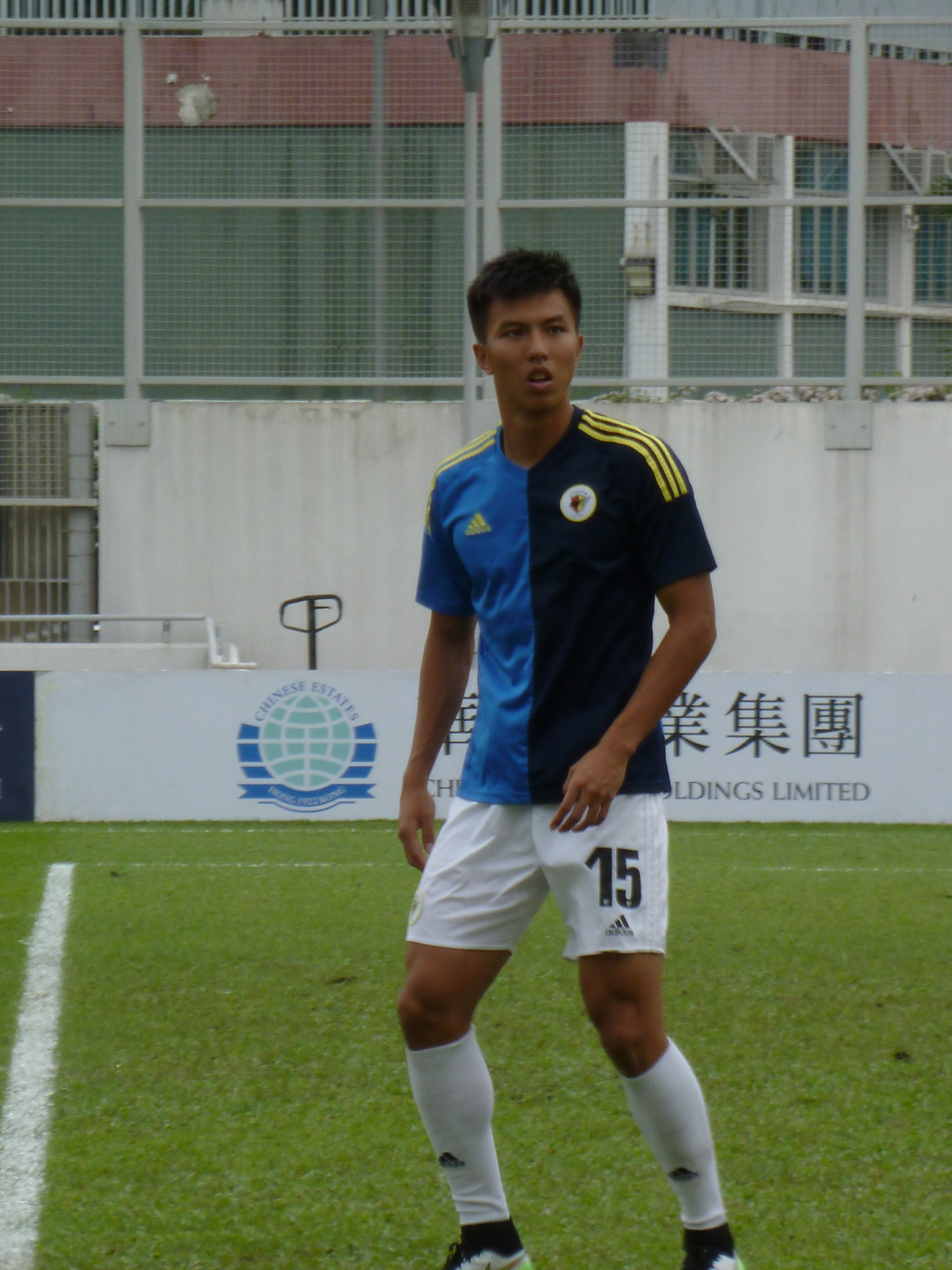
Fung playing for Pegasus in 2016.

In 2005, Fung through a project to go to Newcastle United to have training.

In 2008, Fung signed for Hong Kong Third Division club Sham Shui Po.

In 2012, Fung signed for Hong Kong First Division club Yokohama FC Hong Kong.

In 2015, Fung signed for Hong Kong Premier League club Pegasus.

On 17 July 2019, Eastern announced the signing of Fung at their season opening media event.

On 30 June 2020, it was confirmed that Fung had left the club in order to sign with R&F.

On 19 November 2020, Fung announced that he reached a mutual termination with R&F and had returned to Eastern.

On 19 June 2022, Fung left Eastern again.

On 15 July 2022, Fung joined Lee Man.

On 20 June 2024, Fung announced his retirement from professional football.

== International career ==
On 11 December 2019, Fung made his international debut for Hong Kong in a 2019 EAFF E-1 Football Championship match against South Korea.

== Career statistics ==
=== Club ===
As of 20 May 2021

Club	Season	League		Senior Shield		League Cup		FA Cup		AFC Cup		Total	
Club	Season	Apps	Goals	Apps	Goals	Apps	Goals	Apps	Goals	Apps	Goals	Apps	Goals
Sham Shui Po	2011–12	12	0	-		1	0	-		-		13	0
Dreams Metro Gallery	2014–15	6	0	0	0	2	0	-		-		8	0
Pegasus	2015–16	6	0	0	0	1	0	1	0	-		8	0
Tai Po	2016–17	15	2	2	0	-		0	0	-		17	2
Tai Po	2017–18	3	0	0	0	-		1	0	-		4	0
Tai Po	2018–19	16	1	3	0	-		0	0	8	0	27	1
Eastern	2019–20	7	1	1	0	-		1	0	-		9	1
Eastern	2020–21	11	0	-		-		0	0	-		11	0
	Total	76	4	6	0	4	0	3	0	8	0	97	4

=== International ===
As of matches played 24 September 2022

National team	Year	Apps	Goals
Hong Kong	2019	1	0
Hong Kong	2020	0	0
Hong Kong	2021	3	0
Hong Kong	2022	5	0
Total		9	0

#	Date	Venue	Opponent	Result	Competition
1	11 December 2019	Busan Asiad Main Stadium, Busan, South Korea	South Korea	0–2	
2	3 June 2021	Al Muharraq Stadium, Arad, Bahrain	Iran	1–3	2022 FIFA World Cup qualification
3	11 June 2021	Al Muharraq Stadium, Arad, Bahrain	Iraq	0–1	2022 FIFA World Cup qualification
4	15 June 2021	Al Muharraq Stadium, Arad, Bahrain	Bahrain	0–4	2022 FIFA World Cup qualification
5	1 June 2022	Bukit Jalil National Stadium, Kuala Lumpur, Malaysia	Malaysia	0–2	Friendly
6	8 June 2022	Salt Lake Stadium, Kolkata, India	Afghanistan	2–1	2023 AFC Asian Cup qualification
7	14 June 2022	Salt Lake Stadium, Kolkata, India	India	0–4	2023 AFC Asian Cup qualification
8	21 September 2022	Mong Kok Stadium, Mong Kok, Hong Kong	Myanmar	2–0	Friendly
9	24 September 2022	Hong Kong Stadium, So Kon Po, Hong Kong	Myanmar	0–0	Friendly

== Honours ==
=== Club ===
Sham Shui Po

- Hong Kong Second Division: 2010–11
- Hong Kong Third Division: 2009–10

Pegasus

- Hong Kong FA Cup: 2015–16
- Hong Kong Sapling Cup: 2015–16

Tai Po

- Hong Kong Premier League: 2018–19
- Hong Kong Sapling Cup: 2016–17

Eastern

- Hong Kong Sapling Cup: 2020–21
