= 2012 The Cross Straits, Hong Kong & Macau Football Competition for the Youth =

2012 The Cross Straits, Hong Kong & Macau Football Competition for the Youth is the 2nd edition of the football tournament held in Hong Kong. It was held from 28 September to 2 October 2012. The competition was organised for U-16 players.

== Participating teams ==
- Hong Kong (host)
- China PR
- Macau
- Chinese Taipei

== Squads ==
=== Hong Kong ===
- Hon. Team Manager: Mok Yiu Keung
- Coaches: Yeung Ching Kwong, Poon Yiu Cheuk, Cheung King Wah

No.	Pos.	Player	Date of birth (age)	Caps	Club
	GK	Man Wai Sum			(Hong Kong) Rangers
	GK	Law Ka Long			Yokohama FC Hong Kong
	DF	Axel Rydberg			Hong Kong FC
	DF	Cheung Ka Hay Michael			(Hong Kong) Kitchee
	DF	Lau Chun Ho			(Hong Kong) Rangers
	DF	Law Tai Yan			(Hong Kong) Rangers
	DF	Lam Chun Kiu Calvin			Yokohama FC Hong Kong
	DF	Tsang Hiroki			Yokohama FC Hong Kong
	MF	Cheng Ngo Chun			(Hong Kong) Kitchee
	MF	Ho Cheuk Hang			(Hong Kong) Kitchee
	MF	Law Tsz Chun			(Hong Kong) Kitchee
	MF	Matt Orr			(Hong Kong) Kitchee
	MF	Remi Dujardin			(Hong Kong) Kitchee
	MF	Au Cheuk Lun			(Hong Kong) Rangers
	MF	Clinton Ng			(Hong Kong) Rangers
	MF	Sham Tze Hang Henry			(Hong Kong) Rangers
	MF	Wong Chung Ki			(Hong Kong) Rangers
	MF	Chan Pak Hei			(Hong Kong) Tuen Mun
	MF	Wu Chun Ming			Yokohama FC Hong Kong
	FW	Cheng Siu Kwan			(Hong Kong) Rangers
	FW	Cheung Yan Ming			Yokohama FC Hong Kong
	FW	Hui Ka Lok			Yokohama FC Hong Kong

== Results ==
Team	Pts	Pld	W	D	L	GF	GA	GD
Hong Kong	7	3	2	1	0	16	1	+15
China PR	7	3	0	0	0	12	2	+10
Chinese Taipei	3	3	1	0	2	2	7	–5
Macau	0	3	0	0	3	1	21	–20

28 September 2012
10:00

Hong Kong	12 - 0	Macau
Cheng Siu Kwan 16', 17', 70', 76'; Matt Orr 19', 26', 34'; Clinton Ng 58'; 75' (o.g.); Cheng Ngo Chun 81'; Wu Chun Ming 86', 90'	Report

Po Kong Village Road Park

28 September 2012
10:00

China PR	4 - 0	Chinese Taipei
Feng Boxuan 37'; Wang Ganyu 52'; He Fei 66', 70'	Report

Po Kong Village Road Park

30 September 2012
10:00

Hong Kong	3 - 0	Chinese Taipei
Cheng Siu Kwan 1'; Wu Chun Ming 33'; Matt Orr 47'	Report

Po Kong Village Road Park

30 September 2012
10:00

Macau	1 - 7	China PR
63'	Report	4', 32', 41' Hu Zhuang; 25' Feng Boxuan; 72' Deng Di; 87' Guo Jing; 90' Sun Weiwen

Po Kong Village Road Park

2 October 2012
10:00

Hong Kong	1 - 1	China PR
Wu Chun Ming 88'	Report	24' Hu Zhuang

Po Kong Village Road Park

2 October 2012
10:00

Chinese Taipei	2 - 0	Macau
Xu Fu 21'; Wang qiangxian 23'	Report

Po Kong Village Road Park
