= David Lazari =

Brazilian footballer (born 1989)

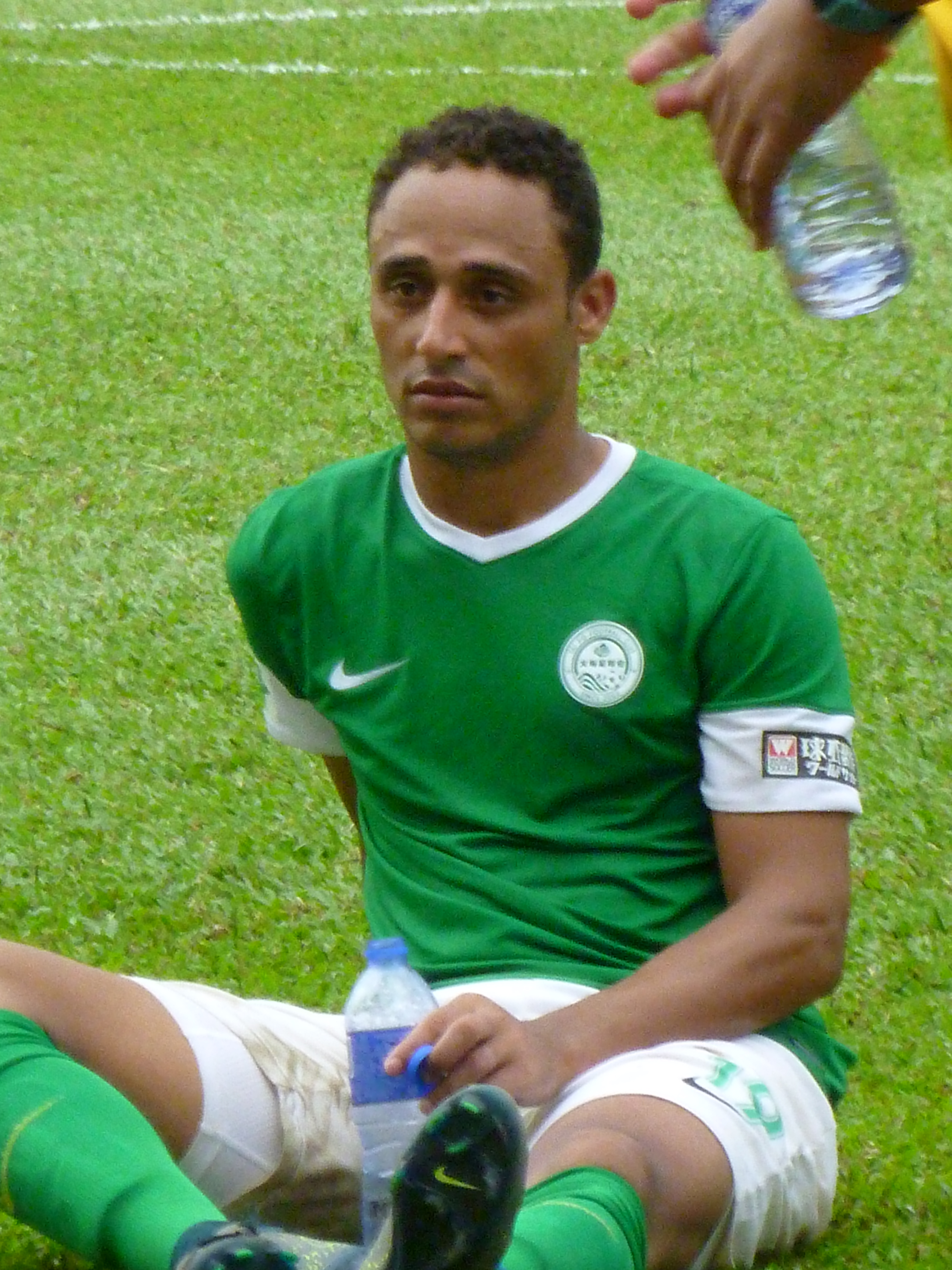

Personal information
- Full name: David Rafael Lazari
- Date of birth: April 30, 1989 (age 37)
- Place of birth: Novo Horizonte, Brazil
- Height: 1.80 m (5 ft 11 in)
- Position: Attacking midfielder

Team information
- Current team: Rio Branco SP
- Number: 8

Senior career*
| Years | Team | Apps | (Gls) |
| 2007–2008 | Joinville EC | 26 | (1) |
| 2009–2010 | Santa Cruz | 12 | (6) |
| 2010 | Sliven 2000 | 12 | (1) |
| 2011–2012 | Dinamo Brest | 31 | (8) |
| 2012 | Al-Qadsia | 7 | (2) |
| 2013 | Trindade–GO | 0 | (0) |
| 2013–2014 | Al-Mesaimeer | 34 | (21) |
| 2014–2015 | Novorizontino | 16 | (4) |
| 2016 | Real Estelí | 12 | (4) |
| 2016–2018 | Tai Po | 40 | (2) |
| 2019–2020 | Pegasus | 18 | (2) |
| 2021 | Caldense | 11 | (1) |
| 2021 | Ferroviária | 6 | (0) |
| 2022 | Uberlândia | 9 | (0) |
| 2022 | Caldense | 14 | (2) |
| 2023 | Matonense | 14 | (0) |
| 2024 | Goiatuba | 9 | (0) |
| 2024– | Rio Branco SP | | |
- * Club domestic league appearances and goals as of 1 June 2024

David Rafael Lazari (born 30 April 1989) is a Brazilian professional footballer who plays for Rio Branco SP.

== Career ==
In August 2010 Lazari signed for Sliven 2000 in the A PFG, where he played until the end of the year. In October 2011, he joined Dinamo Brest in the Belarusian Premier League. On 31 December 2018, it was announced that Tai Po had reached an agreement with Pegasus to swap Lazari in exchange for João Emir. After spending over a year at Pegasus, his stay was cut short due to the 2020 coronavirus pandemic which caused the 2019–20 season to be suspended. On 8 April 2020, Lazari agreed to a mutual termination with Pegasus.

== Honours ==
=== Club ===
Tai Po

- Hong Kong Sapling Cup: 2016–17
