= Tiago Leonço =

Brazilian footballer (born 1992)

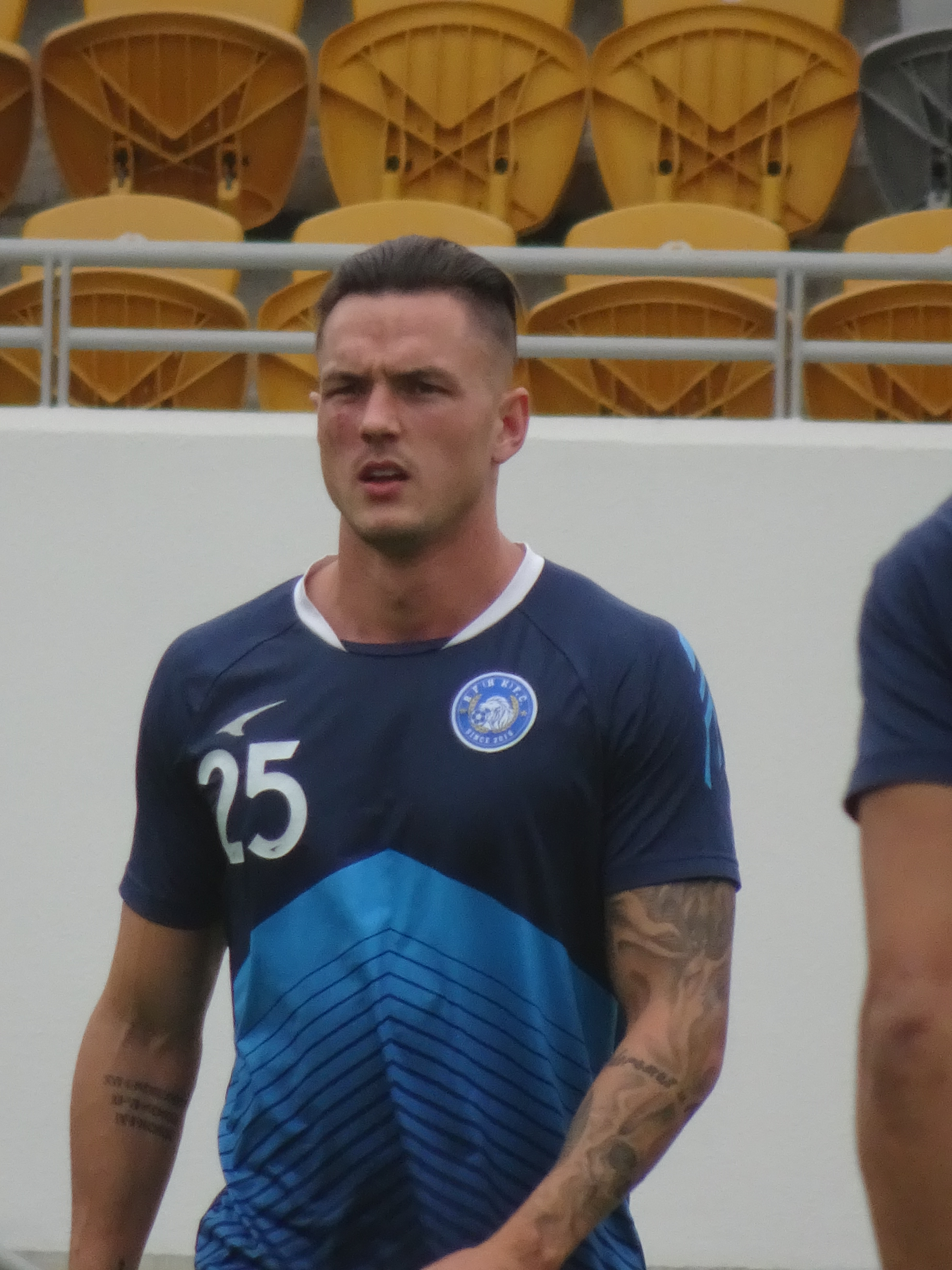
- Leonço with R&F in 2018

Personal information
- Full name: Tiago de Leonço
- Date of birth: 11 November 1992 (age 34)
- Place of birth: Novo Hamburgo, Brazil
- Height: 1.86 m (6 ft 1 in)
- Position: Centre forward

Team information
- Current team: Al-Karma SC
- Number: 70

Senior career*
Years	Team	Apps	(Gls)
2012	Lajeadense	0	(0)
2013	Novo Hamburgo	2	(0)
2013–2014	Santa Clara	34	(5)
2015	Leixões	17	(4)
2015–2016	Farense	21	(3)
2016–2017	Vendsyssel	45	(14)
2017–2018	AEL Limassol	11	(4)
2018–2020	R&F	35	(20)
2020	→ Beijing Renhe (loan)	17	(8)
2021	Guangzhou City	19	(7)
2022–2023	JEF United Chiba	27	(4)
2023	Al Dhafra	14	(5)
2023	Khor Fakkan	11	(4)
2024	Muaither	10	(7)
2024–2025	Shenzhen Peng City	37	(3)
2026–	Al-Karma SC	0	(0)
- * Club domestic league appearances and goals as of 31 October 2025

Tiago de Leonço (born 11 November 1992) is a Brazilian professional footballer who plays for Iraq Stars League club Al-Karma SC.

== Club career ==
Born in Novo Hamburgo, Leonço represented lower league clubs in his country. He moved abroad on 20 August 2013, and signed for Portuguese second tier club Santa Clara. On 2 February 2015, he switched to Leixões after being a free agent since the end of the previous season. In the following season, he moved to Farense. However, his contract was soon terminated on 19 January 2016.

On 31 July 2017, Leonço signed with Cypriot First Division club AEL Limassol after a stint with Danish second tier club Vendsyssel.

On 21 January 2018, Leonço signed with Hong Kong Premier League club R&F.

In September 2020, Leonço joined China League One club Beijing Renhe on loan. Despite scoring 8 goals in 17 league appearances, his performance was not enough to prevent Renhe's relegation from the second division.

On 8 March 2021, Leonço joined China Super League club Guangzhou City on a two-year deal.

== Career statistics ==
As of match played 31 October 2025

Appearances and goals by club, season and competition
Club	Season	League			State League		National Cup		League Cup		Continental		Other		Total	
Club	Season	Division	Apps	Goals	Apps	Goals	Apps	Goals	Apps	Goals	Apps	Goals	Apps	Goals	Apps	Goals
Lajeadense	2012	Gaúcho	—		0	0	—		—		—		—		0	0
Novo Hamburgo	2013	Gaúcho	—		2	0	—		—		—		—		2	0
Santa Clara	2013–14	Segunda Liga	34	5	—		2	1	2	0	—		—		38	6
Leixões	2014–15	Segunda Liga	17	4	—		—		—		—		—		17	4
Farense	2015–16	LigaPro	21	3	—		1	0	0	0	—		—		22	3
Vendsyssel	2015–16	1. Division	13	1	—		—		—		—		—		13	1
Vendsyssel	2016–17	1. Division	32	13	—		6	6	—		—		2	1	40	20
Vendsyssel	Total		45	14	—		6	6	—		—		2	1	43	21
AEL Limassol	2017–18	Cypriot First Division	11	4	—		—		—		0	0	—		11	4
R&F	2017–18	Hong Kong Premier League	11	6	—		—		—		—		2	3	13	9
R&F	2018–19	Hong Kong Premier League	16	11	—		1	0	—		—		2	0	19	11
R&F	2019–20	Hong Kong Premier League	8	3	—		1	1	—		—		8	2	17	6
R&F	Total		35	20	—		2	1	—		—		12	5	49	26
Beijing Renhe (loan)	2020	China League One	15	8	—		—		—		—		2	0	17	8
Guangzhou City	2021	Chinese Super League	19	7	—		1	1	—		—		—		20	8
JEF United Chiba	2022	J2 League	27	4	—		0	0	—		—		—		27	4
Al Dhafra	2022–23	UAE Pro League	14	5	—		1	1	—		—		—		15	6
Khor Fakkan	2023–24	UAE Pro League	11	4	—		—		2	1	—		—		13	5
Muaither	2023–24	Qatar Stars League	10	7	—		1	1	—		—		—		11	8
Shenzhen Peng City	2024	Chinese Super League	9	0	—		0	0	—		—		—		9	0
Shenzhen Peng City	2025	Chinese Super League	28	3	—		0	0	—		—		—		28	3
Shenzhen Peng City	Total		37	3	—		0	0	—		—		—		37	3
Career total			296	88	2	0	14	11	4	1	0	0	16	6	332	106
