= Bae Chan-soo =

Korean association football player

Personal information
- Full name: Bae Chan-soo
- Date of birth: 14 March 1998 (age 28)
- Place of birth: South Korea
- Height: 1.73 m (5 ft 8 in)
- Position: Midfielder

Senior career*
| Years | Team | Apps | (Gls) |
| 2017 | Uijeongbu | 2 | (0) |
| 2018–2019 | Hoi King | 7 | (1) |
- * Club domestic league appearances and goals as of 17 March 2019

- Bae Chan-soo
- Hangul: 배찬수
- RR: Bae Chansu
- MR: Pae Ch'ansu

Bae Chan-soo (Korean: 배찬수; born 14 March 1998) is a South Korean footballer plays as a midfielder and is currently a free agent.

== Career statistics ==
=== Club ===
As of 17 March 2019.

| Club | Season | League | | | National Cup | | League Cup | | Continental | | Other | | Total | |
| Club | Season | Division | Apps | Goals | Apps | Goals | Apps | Goals | Apps | Goals | Apps | Goals | Apps | Goals |
|---|---|---|---|---|---|---|---|---|---|---|---|---|---|---|
| Uijeongbu | 2017 | K3 League | 2 | 0 | 0 | 0 | 0 | 0 | – | | 0 | 0 | 2 | 0 |
| Hoi King | 2018–19 | Hong Kong Premier League | 7 | 1 | 0 | 0 | 1 (Note: Appearances in the Sapling Cup) | 0 | – | | 0 | 0 | 8 | 1 |
| Career total | | | 9 | 1 | 0 | 0 | 1 | 0 | 0 | 0 | 0 | 0 | 10 | 1 |
