= Diego Higino =

Brazilian footballer (born 1986)

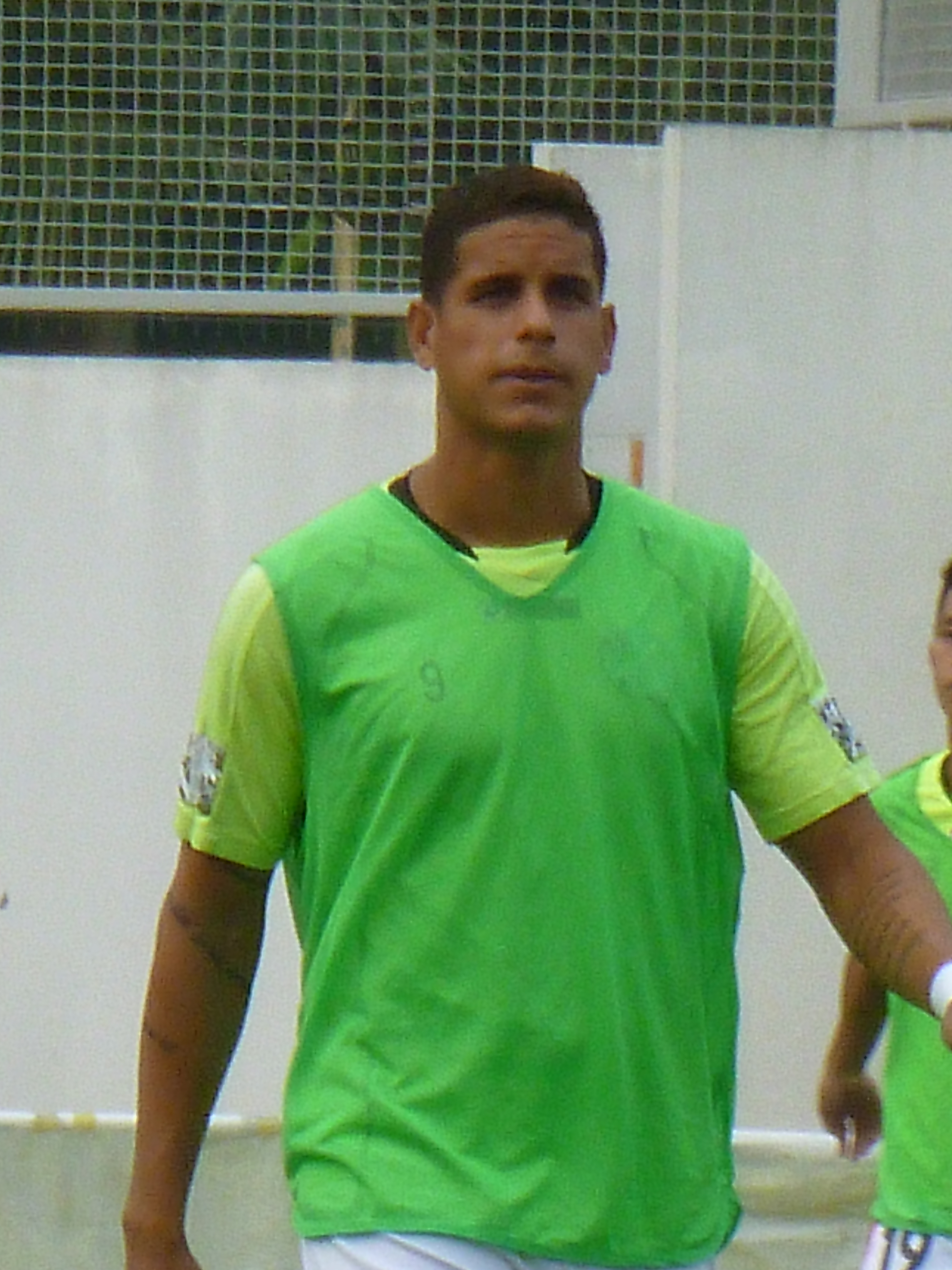
- Higino in 2016

Personal information
- Full name: Diego Higino Nascimento
- Date of birth: September 14, 1986 (age 40)
- Place of birth: Salvador, Brazil
- Height: 1.82 m (6 ft 0 in)
- Position: Forward

Youth career
- 2006: Galícia

Senior career*
Years	Team	Apps	(Gls)
2006–2007	Galícia	21	(15)
2008	América–RN	6	(5)
2008–2009	Vasco da Gama	5	(4)
2009	Atlético de Alagoinhas	5	(1)
2010	ASSU	1	(0)
2010–2011	Galícia		
2011–2012	Juazeiro	2	(0)
2012	→ São Mateus (Loan)	2	(0)
2012	Botafogo–BA	13	(2)
2012	Atlético de Alagoinhas		
2013	Galícia		
2013	Botafogo–BA		
2014	Jacuipense	16	(2)
2014	Flamengo de Guanambi		
2015	Velo Clube	15	(3)
2015	Ypiranga		
2016	Anapolina	6	(0)
2016	Vitória da Conquista	1	(0)
2016–2017	Yuen Long	19	(7)
2017	Atlético Tubarão		
2018–2019	Dreams	15	(4)
- * Club domestic league appearances and goals

Diego Higino Nascimento (born September 14, 1986), is a Brazilian former professional footballer who played as a forward.
