= Michel Lugo =

Brazilian footballer

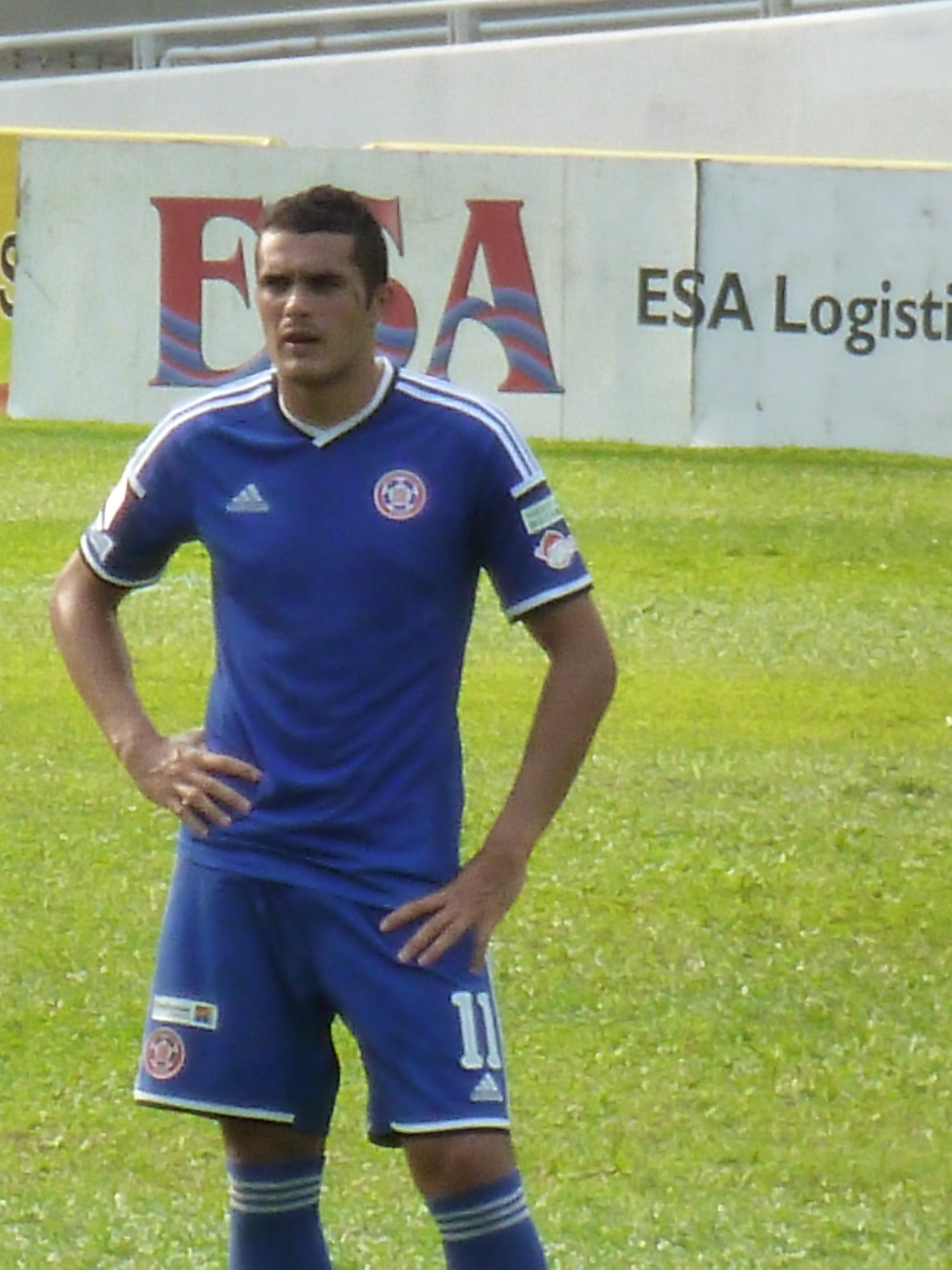

Personal information
- Full name: Michel Antunes Lugo
- Date of birth: 9 June 1987 (age 39)
- Place of birth: Rio Grande do Sul, Brazil
- Height: 1.85 m (6 ft 1 in)
- Positions: Winger; attacking midfielder

Senior career*
Years	Team	Apps	(Gls)
2007–2010	Inter-SM		
2010–2011	Guarany		
2011–2012	Paços de Ferreira	5	(1)
2012	GE Bagé		
2013	União Frederiquense		
2013–2014	Sun Hei	17	(7)
2014–2018	Eastern	55	(17)
2018–2020	Tai Po	25	(8)
- * Club domestic league appearances and goals as of 18 January 2020

Michel Antunes Lugo (Chinese: 勞高; born 9 June 1987) is a former Brazilian professional footballer who played as a winger.

== Club career ==
After playing for a number of clubs in Brazil, Lugo signed for Paços de Ferreira of Primeira Liga in 2011. In the following two seasons, he went back home and played for GE Bagé and União Frederiquense, before signing for Sun Hei in Hong Kong on a free transfer. He made his debut for the club in a 6–2 away defeat against Kitchee, where he also scored a goal in the 44th minute.

On 31 July 2018, Tai Po announced the signing of Lugo. On 27 April 2020, it was announced that Lugo had terminated his contract with the club over salary arrears.

== Honours ==
=== Club ===
Tai Po

- Hong Kong Premier League: 2018–19
