= 2015–16 Hong Kong Sapling Cup =

Tournament details
- Country: Hong Kong
- Dates: 10 October 2015 – 18 May 2016
- Teams: 9

Final positions
- Champions: Pegasus (1st title)
- Runners-up: South China

Tournament statistics
- Matches played: 19
- Goals scored: 46 (2.42 per match)
- Attendance: 14,795 (779 per match)
- All statistics correct as of 18 May 2016.

2015–16 Hong Kong Sapling Cup (officially the 2015–16 Henderson Sapling Cup for sponsorship reasons) was the inaugural edition of the Sapling Cup. The Cup is contested by the 9 football teams in the 2015–16 Hong Kong Premier League.

The objective of the Cup was to create more potential playing opportunities for youth players. In this Cup competition, each team must play a minimum of two players born on or after 1 January 1994 (U22) and six foreign players at most during every whole match, or send at most four foreign players during every whole match.

Pegasus won the title on 18 May 2016.

== Calendar ==
Stage	Draw Date	Date	Matches	Clubs
Group Stage	2 October 2015	10 October 2015 – 24 February 2016	16	9 → 4
Semi-finals	2 October 2015	28 – 29 March 2016	2	4 → 2
Final	2 October 2015	18 May 2016 at Mong Kok Stadium	1	2 → 1

== Results ==
=== Group stage ===
==== Group A ====
Pos	Team	Pld	W	D	L	GF	GA	GD	Pts	Qualification
1	Eastern	4	3	1	0	10	5	+5	10	Advance to semi-finals
2	Rangers	4	2	1	1	6	4	+2	7	Advance to semi-finals
3	Kitchee	4	1	2	1	5	4	+1	5	
4	Southern	4	1	1	2	4	6	−2	4	
5	Yuen Long	4	0	1	3	4	10	−6	1	

Source: Hong Kong Football Association
Rules for classification: 1) Points; 2) Head-to-head points; 3) Head-to-head goal difference; 4) Head-to-head goals scored; 5) Goal difference; 6) Goals scored; 7) Fair-play points; 8) Drawing lots

10 October 2015 M01	Southern	2–1	Yuen Long	Mong Kok, Hong Kong
14:30 UTC+8	Garrido 70'; Spitz 90+3'	Report	Cruz 90+4'	Stadium: Mong Kok Stadium; Attendance: 465; Referee: Tong Kui Sum

21 October 2015 M02	Eastern	1–1	Kitchee	Mong Kok, Hong Kong
14:30 UTC+8	Lee Hong Lim 40'	Report	Sham Kwok Keung 38'	Stadium: Mong Kok Stadium; Attendance: 2,196; Referee: Ng Chiu Kok

28 October 2015 M03	Kitchee	4–1	Yuen Long	Kowloon Bay, Hong Kong
20:00 UTC+8	Sandro 10', 34' (pen.), 86'; Alex 47'	Report	Yuan Yang 39'	Stadium: Kowloon Bay Park; Attendance: 293; Referee: Liu Kwok Man

20 November 2015 M04	Rangers	1–3	Eastern	Kowloon Bay, Hong Kong
20:00 UTC+8	Ling 90'	Report	Giovane 45', 80'; Lee Hong Lim 67'	Stadium: Kowloon Bay Park; Attendance: 679; Referee: Tang Hing Fook

9 December 2015 M06	Southern	0–0	Kitchee	Kowloon Bay, Hong Kong
20:00 UTC+8		Report		Stadium: Kowloon Bay Park; Attendance: 251; Referee: Tong Kui Sum

20 December 2015 M07	Yuen Long	1–3	Eastern	Mong Kok, Hong Kong
14:30 UTC+8	Yuan Yang 69'	Report	Cheng King Ho 8'; Giovane 47'; Cruz 88' (o.g.)	Stadium: Mong Kok Stadium; Attendance: 1,324; Referee: Ching Oi Cho

25 December 2015 M09	Yuen Long	1–1	Rangers	Yuen Long, Hong Kong
14:30 UTC+8	Luciano 8'	Report	Cheng Siu Kwan 43'	Stadium: Yuen Long Stadium; Attendance: 426; Referee: Liu Kwok Man

13 January 2016 M12	Kitchee	0–2	Rangers	Mong Kok, Hong Kong
20:00 UTC+8		Report	Chuck Yiu Kwok 50'; Hui Wang Fung 51'	Stadium: Mong Kok Stadium; Attendance: 418; Referee: Tang Hing Fu

17 February 2016 M16	Eastern	3–2	Southern	Mong Kok, Hong Kong
20:00 UTC+8	Nägelein 14'; Giovane 26', 53'	Report	Luk 45+1'; Spitz 52'	Stadium: Mong Kok Stadium; Attendance: 750; Referee: Ng Kai Lam

24 February 2016 M15	Rangers	2–0	Southern	Tseung Kwan O, Hong Kong
20:00 UTC+8	Beto 41' (pen.); Ernesto 83'	Report		Stadium: Tseung Kwan O Sports Ground; Attendance: 127; Referee: Tong Kui Sum

==== Group B ====
Pos	Team	Pld	W	D	L	GF	GA	GD	Pts	Qualification
1	Pegasus	3	2	1	0	3	0	+3	7	Advance to semi-finals
2	South China	3	2	0	1	5	4	+1	6	Advance to semi-finals
3	Wong Tai Sin	3	1	0	2	2	3	−1	3	
4	Dreams Metro Gallery	3	0	1	2	1	4	−3	1	

Source: Hong Kong Football Association
Rules for classification: 1) Points; 2) Head-to-head points; 3) Head-to-head goal difference; 4) Head-to-head goals scored; 5) Goal difference; 6) Goals scored; 7) Fair-play points; 8) Drawing lots

21 November 2015 M05	Pegasus	2–0	South China	Tseung Kwan O, Hong Kong
17:30 UTC+8	Adrović 48'; Emir 53'	Report		Stadium: Tseung Kwan O Sports Ground; Attendance: 728; Referee: Liu Kwok Man

20 December 2015 M08	Pegasus	0–0	Dreams Metro Gallery	Kowloon Bay, Hong Kong
17:30 UTC+8		Report		Stadium: Kowloon Bay Park; Attendance: 226; Referee: Tang Hing Fu

25 December 2015 M10	Dreams Metro Gallery	0–1	Wong Tai Sin	Mong Kok, Hong Kong
17:30 UTC+8		Report	Nakamura 68'	Stadium: Mong Kok Stadium; Attendance: 484; Referee: Lau Fong Hei

6 January 2016 M11	Wong Tai Sin	1–2	South China	Kowloon Bay, Hong Kong
20:00 UTC+8	Yoon Dong-hun 53'	Report	Lam Hok Hei 47', 67'	Stadium: Kowloon Bay Park; Attendance: 353; Referee: Liu Kwok Man

22 January 2016 M13	South China	3–1	Dreams Metro Gallery	Mong Kok, Hong Kong
20:00 UTC+8	Carlos 13'; Awal 20'; Griffiths 65'	Report	Li Ka Chun 37'	Stadium: Mong Kok Stadium; Attendance: 444; Referee: Ng Kai Lam

23 January 2016 M14	Wong Tai Sin	0–1	Pegasus	Mong Kok, Hong Kong
14:30 UTC+8		Report	Dhiego 17'	Stadium: Mong Kok Stadium; Attendance: 385; Referee: Tang Hing Fu

=== Semi-finals ===
28 March 2016 M17	Eastern	0–3	South China	Mong Kok, Hong Kong
15:00 UTC+8		Report	Liang Zicheng 19'; Borja 29'; Griffiths 59'	Stadium: Mong Kok Stadium; Attendance: 2,671; Referee: Chan Ming Siu

29 March 2016 M18	Pegasus	1–0	Rangers	Mong Kok, Hong Kong
20:00 UTC+8	Mauricio 26' (o.g.)	Report		Stadium: Mong Kok Stadium; Attendance: 425; Referee: Liu Kwok Man

=== Final ===
18 May 2016 M19	South China	1–1 (a.e.t.) (1–3 p)	Pegasus	Mong Kok, Hong Kong
20:00 UTC+8	Sean Tse 90+4'	Report	Adrović 90+3'	Stadium: Mong Kok Stadium; Attendance: 2,150; Referee: Liu Kwok Man
	Penalties
	Griffiths (penalty scored); Awal (penalty missed); Law Hiu Chung (penalty missed); Mora (penalty missed)		(penalty scored) Adrović; (penalty scored) Dhiego; (penalty scored) Eduardo; (penalty missed) Cheng Lai Hin
