= Chan Kwong Ho =

Hong Kong footballer

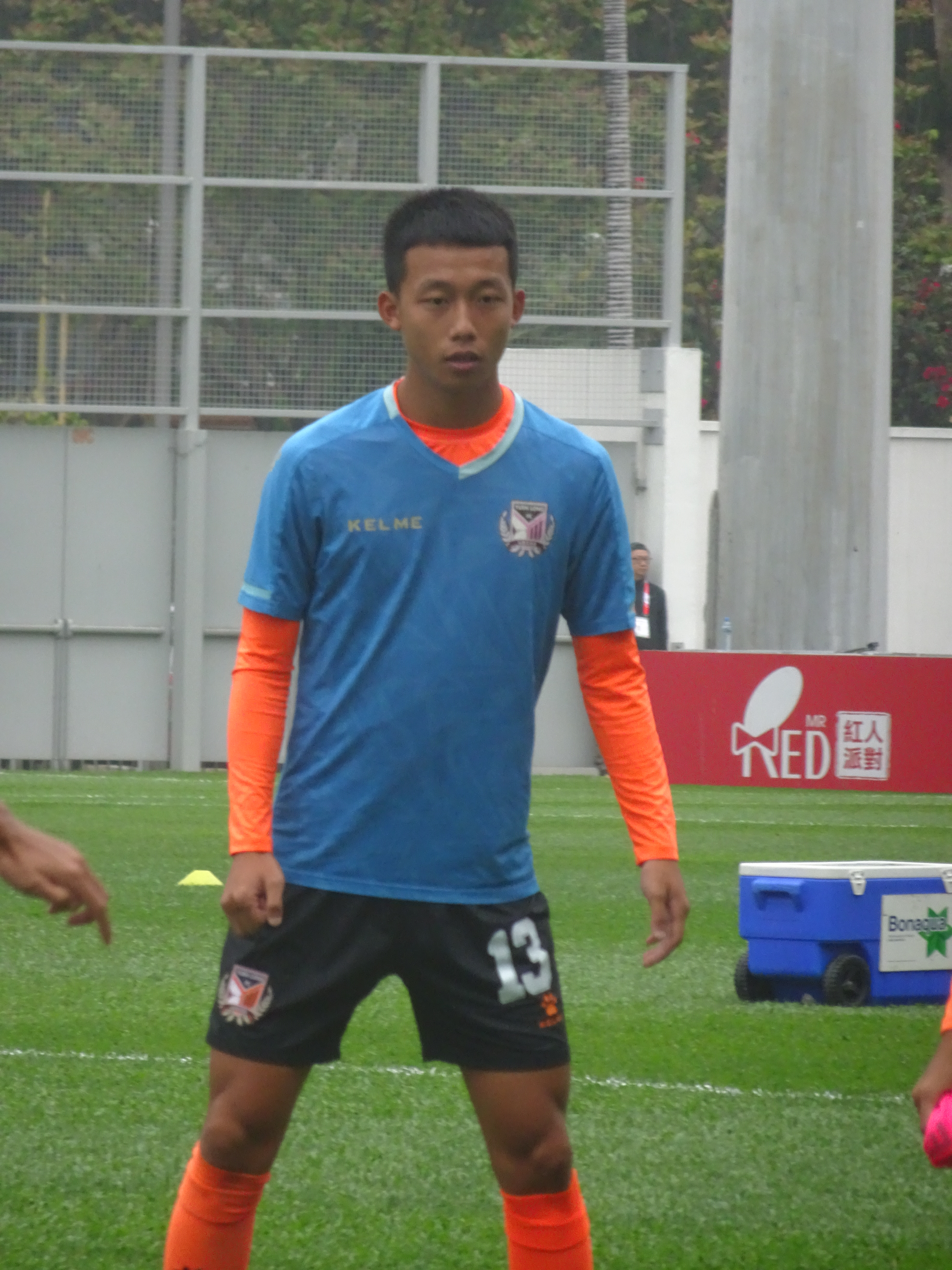

Personal information
- Full name: Chan Kwong Ho
- Date of birth: 31 December 1996 (age 29)
- Place of birth: Hong Kong
- Height: 1.80 m (5 ft 11 in)
- Position: Striker

Youth career
- 2010–2015: Wong Tai Sin

Senior career*
Years	Team	Apps	(Gls)
2015–2016	Wong Tai Sin	0	(0)
2016–2017	Resources Capital	22	(4)
2017–2018	Dreams FC	0	(0)
2017–2018	→ Wing Yee (loan)	25	(1)
2018–2019	Yuen Long	17	(7)
2019–2021	Southern	24	(1)
2021–2024	Wing Yee	59	(20)
2024–2025	Eastern District	23	(2)
2025–	Sun Hei		

International career^{‡}
2019	Hong Kong	1	(0)
- * Club domestic league appearances and goals as of 16 May 2026 ‡ National team caps and goals as of 1 May 2021

Chan Kwong Ho (Chinese: 陳廣豪; born 31 December 1996) is a Hong Kong former professional footballer who played as a striker.

== Club career ==
Chan joined Wong Tai Sin's academy as a U13 player, eventually earning his a professional contract with the club on 7 December 2015. He did not make any appearances for the club and was released after the club was relegated at the end of the season.

On 25 August 2018, Chan was officially announced as a Yuen Long player. In the preseason, he was asked by head coach Kenneth Kwok to switch from defensive midfield to striker. Chan rewarded his manager by scoring on his debut in a 4–4 draw against Tai Po on 2 September 2018.

On 31 May 2019, Southern announced that Chan had signed with the club.

== International career ==
Chan made his international debut for the Hong Kong national team on 11 June 2019, in a friendly match against Chinese Taipei.

== Personal life ==
Chan grew up in the Wong Tai Sin area of Hong Kong. He graduated from the district's Ng Wah Catholic Secondary School in 2016.
