= Eduardo Praes =

Brazilian footballer (born 1988)

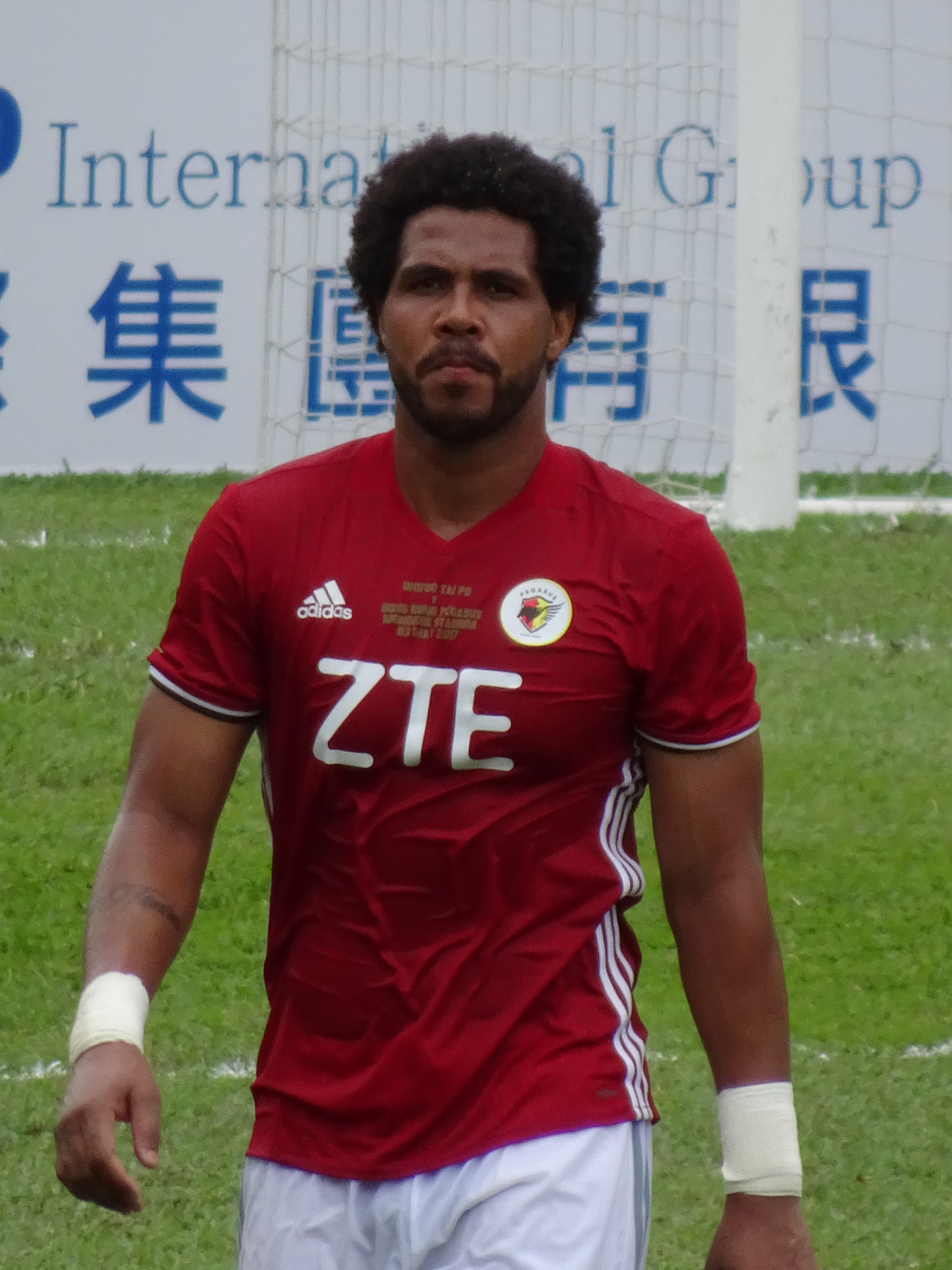

Personal information
- Full name: Eduardo Praes
- Date of birth: 3 November 1988 (age 38)
- Place of birth: Ituverava, Brazil
- Height: 1.88 m (6 ft 2 in)
- Position: Centre back

Youth career
- 2007: Mogi Mirim

Senior career*
Years	Team	Apps	(Gls)
2008	Mogi Mirim		
2009–2010	Coruripe		
2010–2011	Red Bull Brasil	5	(0)
2012–2013	Paulista	6	(1)
2013	Nacional–AM		
2014	Taubaté	14	(0)
2014	Pelotas		
2014–2015	Real Estelí	20	(3)
2015–2017	Pegasus	31	(1)
2017–2019	Tai Po	32	(7)
2019–2022	Eastern	20	(2)
2022	Kitchee	0	(0)
- * Club domestic league appearances and goals as of 12 July 2022

Eduardo Praes (born 3 November 1988) is a former Brazilian professional footballer who played as a centre back.

== Club career ==
In June 2017, Praes was released by Pegasus and later signed with Tai Po. On 13 May 2018, Tai Po manager, Lee Chi Kin confirmed that Eduardo would remain with the club next season.

On 17 July 2019, Praes was signed by Eastern, with a contract until 30 June 2021.

On 31 May 2022, Praes left Eastern after finishing his contract.

On 12 July 2022, Praes joined Kitchee. He left the club 13 days later due to family reasons.

On 2 August 2022, Praes announced his retirement from professional football.

== Honours ==
=== Club ===
Eastern

- Hong Kong Senior Shield: 2019–20
- Hong Kong FA Cup: 2019–20
- Hong Kong Sapling Cup: 2020–21

Tai Po

- Hong Kong Premier League: 2018–19

Pegasus

- Hong Kong FA Cup: 2015–16
- Hong Kong Sapling Cup: 2015–16

== Career statistics ==
=== Club ===
As of 20 May 2021

Club	Season	Division	League		Senior Shield		League Cup		FA Cup		AFC Cup		Total	
Club	Season	Division	Apps	Goals	Apps	Goals	Apps	Goals	Apps	Goals	Apps	Goals	Apps	Goals
Pegasus	2015–16	First Division	14	1	1	0	3	2	4	0	-		22	3
Pegasus	2016–17	First Division	17	1	2	0	-		1	0	-		20	1
Wofoo Tai Po	2017–18	First Division	17	4	1	1	-		3	0	-		21	5
Wofoo Tai Po	2018–19	First Division	15	3	4	1	-		1	0	8	0	28	4
Eastern	2019–20	First Division	9	0	3	0	-		4	0	-		16	0
Eastern	2020–21	First Division	11	2	-		-		-		-		11	2
	Total		82	11	11	2	3	2	13	0	8	0	118	15
