= Kim Jin-seo (footballer) =

South Korean footballer

Personal information
- Full name: Kim Jin-seo
- Date of birth: 19 December 1994 (age 31)
- Place of birth: Korea Republic
- Height: 1.88 m (6 ft 2 in)
- Position: Centre back

Senior career*
Years	Team	Apps	(Gls)
2018	Hoàng Anh Gia Lai	11	(0)
2018–2019	Hoi King	16	(0)
- * Club domestic league appearances and goals as of 19 May 2019

Kim Jin-seo (Chinese: 金珍曙; born 19 December 1994) is a South Korean footballer who plays as a centre back and is currently a free agent.
