= Robert Gonçalves =

Brazilian footballer

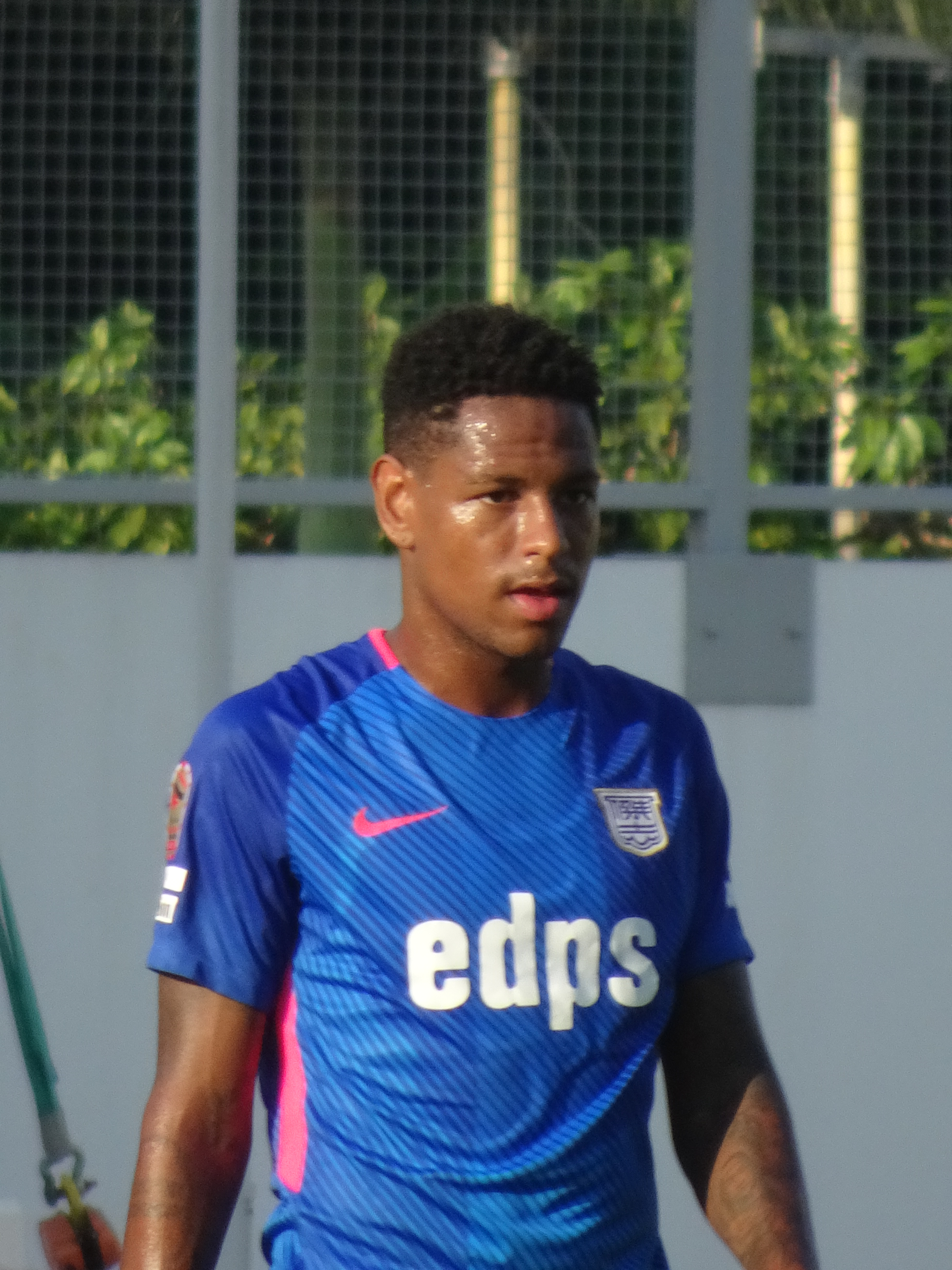

Personal information
- Full name: Robert Gonçalves Santos
- Date of birth: 28 September 1996 (age 30)
- Place of birth: São Gonçalo, Brazil
- Height: 1.75 m (5 ft 9 in)
- Position: Attacking midfielder

Youth career
- 2005–2014: Fluminense

Senior career*
| Years | Team | Apps | (Gls) |
| 2013–2018 | Fluminense | 13 | (2) |
| 2016 | → Paysandu (loan) | 4 | (0) |
| 2016 | → Barcelona B (loan) | 0 | (0) |
| 2017 | → Boavista (loan) | 4 | (0) |
| 2018–2019 | Kitchee | 4 | (3) |
| 2019 | → Hoi King (loan) | 7 | (1) |
| 2020 | Boavista | 0 | (0) |
| 2021 | Portuguesa-RJ | 6 | (1) |
| 2021 | São Gonçalo | 2 | (0) |
| 2024 | Náutico RR | 4 | (0) |

International career
| 2013 | Brazil U17 | 8 | (0) |
- * Club domestic league appearances and goals as of 18:51, 13 February 2022 (UTC)

Robert Gonçalves Santos (born 28 September 1996), commonly known as Robert, is a Brazilian former footballer who played as an attacking midfielder.

== Football career ==
Born in São Gonçalo, Rio de Janeiro, Robert Gonçalves began his career at Fluminense. He was first included in their matchday squad on 3 November 2013, remaining an unused substitute in their Campeonato Brasileiro Série A 1–0 loss at Fla-Flu rivals Clube de Regatas do Flamengo. He was called up for six more games that season, and made his debut in the final fixture on 8 December, replacing Kenedy for the final 24 minutes of a 2–1 win at Esporte Clube Bahia.

After only making three appearances on the bench in the following year's national championship, Robert Gonçalves returned for the 2015 Campeonato Carioca, making five appearances including his first two professional starts. On 8 February, he scored his first goal for the Flu; on as a half-time substitute for Lucas Gomes, he decided a 2–1 win over Bangu Atlético Clube with five minutes remaining at the Maracanã Stadium. He scored in the penalty shootout on 18 April in which his team lost 9–8 to Botafogo de Futebol e Regatas in the semi-finals. Robert went on to make four substitute appearances in the subsequent national league, scoring his first goal in the tournament on 4 October, an added-time consolation in a 3–1 loss at Santos.

On 30 December 2015, Spanish treble champions Barcelona announced the signing of Robert, assigning him to Barcelona B in the Segunda División B for the remainder of the campaign.

On 17 October 2018, Hong Kong club Kitchee confirmed that they would sign Robert following a successful trial in the summer. On 16 January 2019, he was loaned to Hoi King in order to gain more playing time.

On 4 December 2019, Robert Gonçalves returned to Brazilian football, signing a deal with Boavista.

In 2025, aged 28, the player announced the end of his career and began to dedicate himself to music as a samba singer.
