= Robson (footballer, born 1988) =

Brazilian footballer

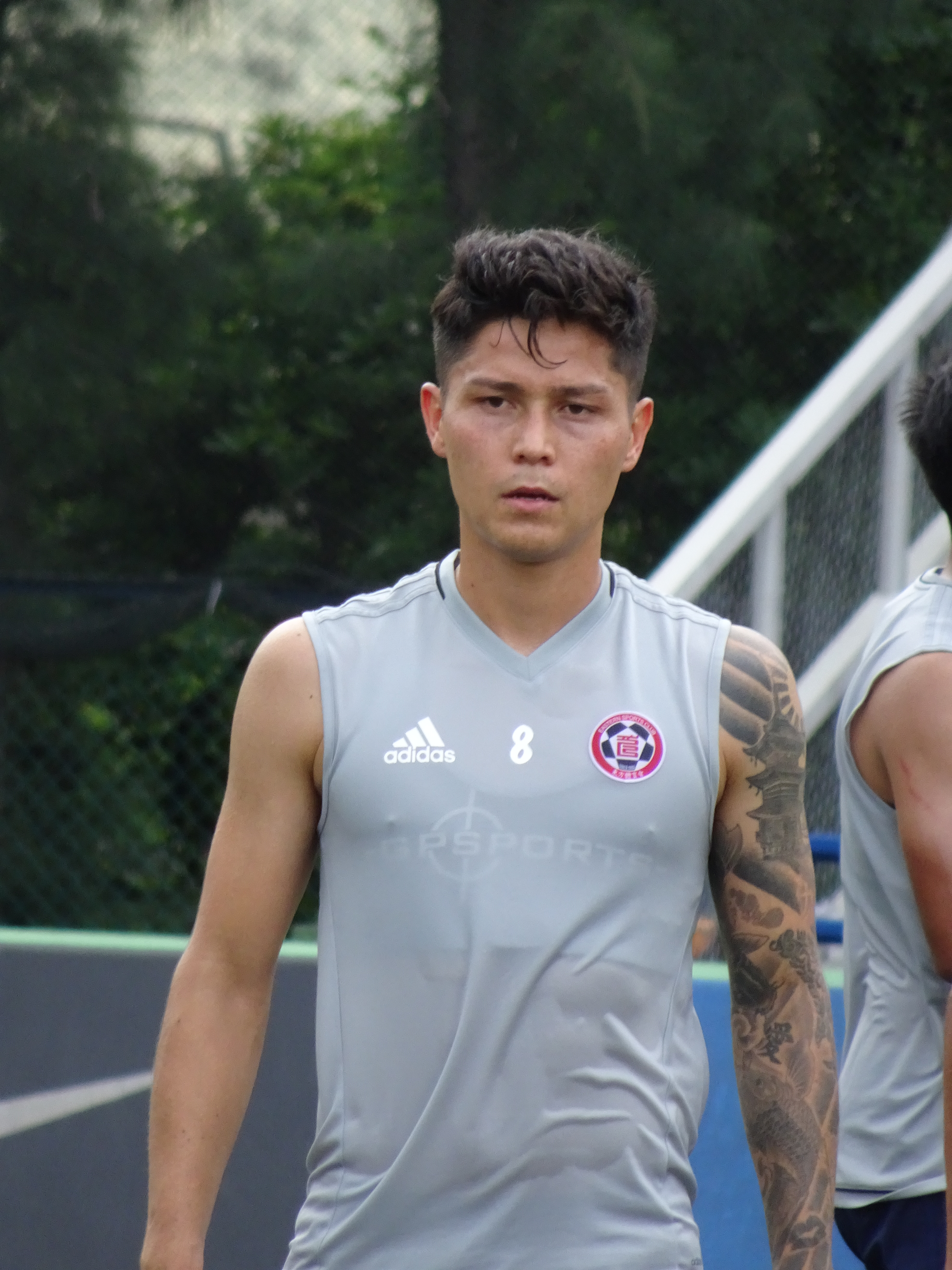
- Robson with Eastern in 2018

Personal information
- Full name: Robson Vaz Shimabuku
- Date of birth: 26 April 1988 (age 38)
- Place of birth: Marília, Brazil
- Height: 1.75 m (5 ft 9 in)
- Position: Midfielder

Team information
- Current team: Cova da Piedade
- Number: 8

Youth career
- –2007: Santos

Senior career*
Years	Team	Apps	(Gls)
2007–2008	Santos	0	(0)
2009–2010	Oliveirense	24	(1)
2011–2012	Moreirense	18	(3)
2012	→ Portimonense (loan)	10	(1)
2012–2013	Penafiel	33	(3)
2013–2014	Tondela	26	(0)
2014–2016	Freamunde	86	(8)
2016–	Cova da Piedade	82	(8)
2018	→ Eastern (loan)	15	(2)
- * Club domestic league appearances and goals as of 01:41, 12 November 2019 (UTC)

Robson Vaz Shimabuku, known as Robson (born 26 April 1988) is a Brazilian professional footballer who plays for LigaPro club Cova da Piedade.

== Career ==
Robson made his professional debut in the Segunda Liga for Oliveirense on 20 September 2009 in a game against Freamunde.

On 14 July 2018, Robson moved to Asia, signing on loan with Hong Kong Premier League club Eastern. On 30 June 2019, it was announced that Robson's loan would not be extended.
