= Wu Chun Ming =

Hong Kong professional footballer

Wu Chun Ming 胡晉銘
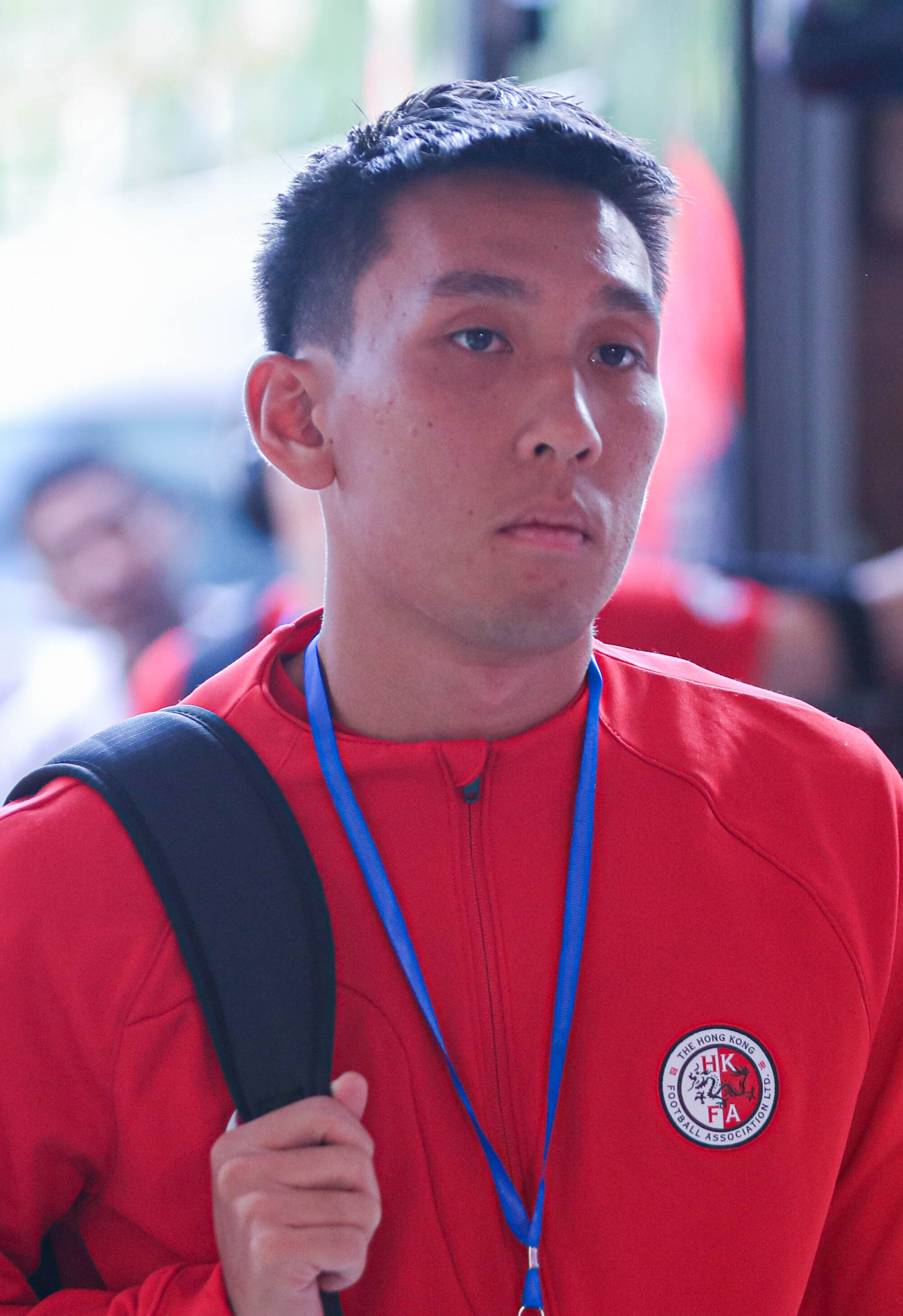
- Wu with Hong Kong in 2023

Personal information
- Full name: Robbie Wu Chun Ming
- Date of birth: 21 November 1997 (age 28)
- Place of birth: Hong Kong
- Height: 1.83 m (6 ft 0 in)
- Positions: Defensive midfielder; centre back

Team information
- Current team: Lee Man
- Number: 6

Youth career
- 2009–2012: Wanchai
- 2013–2015: Pegasus

Senior career*
Years	Team	Apps	(Gls)
2015–2019	Pegasus	48	(1)
2019–2023	Eastern	20	(2)
2020–2021	→ Pegasus (loan)	12	(0)
2023–	Lee Man	64	(1)

International career^{‡}
2015	Hong Kong U-19	4	(0)
2017–	Hong Kong U-23	21	(2)
2017–	Hong Kong	28	(0)
Medal record
Men's football
Representing Hong Kong
FIFA ASEAN Challenge Cup
Winner	2026 Hong Kong
- * Club domestic league appearances and goals as of 20 November 2026 ‡ National team caps and goals as of 3 October 2026

Robbie Wu Chun Ming (Chinese: 胡晉銘; born 21 November 1997) is a Hong Kong professional footballer who currently plays as a defensive midfielder for Hong Kong Premier League club Lee Man and the Hong Kong national team.

== Youth career ==
During his high school years at YMCA of Hong Kong Christian College, Wu joined the Wanchai academy after taking an interest in football due to his father, who was a football fan. He later joined the Pegasus academy where he helped his side to win the 2014-15 Hong Kong FA Youth Cup.

On 12 March 2016, Wu scored the only goal in a 1–0 victory for the City University of Hong Kong in The University Sports Federation of Hong Kong's football championship game.

== Club career ==
On 7 July 2015, Wu signed his first professional contract with Pegasus.

On 3 February 2016, Wu made his first team debut in a 2015–16 Hong Kong FA Cup match against his former youth club Wan Chai. He made his league debut later that year on 7 May, coming on as a substitute against Rangers.

On 12 June 2019, Wu announced that he would be leaving Pegasus after six years in order to challenge himself at a new club.

On 30 June 2019, it was reported that Wu had signed with Eastern.

On 1 September 2020, it was announced that Wu would return to Pegasus on loan for the following season.

On 7 July 2023, Wu joined Lee Man.

== International career ==
Despite having yet reached the age of 16, Wu was selected for the Hong Kong U-18 squad that competed in the 2014 AFC U-19 Championship qualification tournament. He made two appearances for the team during the tournament.

Wu was selected again for the 2016 AFC U-19 Championship qualification tournament where he appeared in all four games.

In July 2017, Wu was selected for the Hong Kong U-22 squad ahead of the 2018 AFC U-23 Championship qualification tournament where he appeared in all three games. He scored the opener against North Korea in a 1–1 draw.

On 5 October 2017, Wu made his senior national team debut in a 4–0 win over Laos.

On 26 December 2023, Wu was named in Hong Kong's squad for the 2023 AFC Asian Cup.

== Career statistics ==
=== International ===
As of 3 October 2026

National team	Year	Apps	Goals
Hong Kong	2017	1	0
Hong Kong	2018	0	0
Hong Kong	2019	0	0
Hong Kong	2020	0	0
Hong Kong	2021	0	0
Hong Kong	2022	7	0
Hong Kong	2023	8	0
Hong Kong	2024	10	0
Hong Kong	2025	0	0
Hong Kong	2026	2	0
Total		28	0

#	Date	Venue	Opponent	Result	Competition
2017
1	5 October 2017	Mong Kok Stadium, Mong Kok, Hong Kong	Laos	4–0	Friendly
2022
2	11 June 2022	Salt Lake Stadium, Kolkata, India	Cambodia	3–0	2023 AFC Asian Cup qualification – third round
3	14 June 2022	Salt Lake Stadium, Kolkata, India	India	0–4	2023 AFC Asian Cup qualification – third round
4	19 July 2022	Kashima Stadium, Kashima, Japan	Japan	0–6	2022 EAFF E-1 Football Championship
5	24 July 2022	Toyota Stadium, Toyota, Japan	South Korea	0–3	2022 EAFF E-1 Football Championship
6	27 July 2022	Toyota Stadium, Toyota, Japan	China	0–1	2022 EAFF E-1 Football Championship
7	21 September 2022	Mong Kok Stadium, Mong Kok, Hong Kong	Myanmar	2–0	Friendly
8	24 September 2022	Hong Kong Stadium, Hong Kong	Myanmar	0–0	Friendly
2023
9	28 March 2023	Sultan Ibrahim Stadium, Johor, Malaysia	Malaysia	0–2	Friendly
10	15 June 2023	Lạch Tray Stadium, Hai Phong, Hong Kong	Vietnam	0–1	Friendly
11	19 June 2023	Hong Kong Stadium, So Kon Po, Hong Kong	Thailand	0–1	Friendly
12	7 September 2023	Phnom Penh Olympic Stadium, Phnom Penh, Hong Kong	Cambodia	1–1	Friendly
13	11 September 2023	Hong Kong Stadium, So Kon Po, Hong Kong	Brunei	10–0	Friendly
14	12 October 2023	Hong Kong Stadium, So Kon Po, Hong Kong	Bhutan	4–0	2026 FIFA World Cup qualification – AFC first round
15	17 October 2023	Changlimithang Stadium, Thimphu, Bhutan	Bhutan	0–2	2026 FIFA World Cup qualification – AFC first round
16	16 November 2023	Azadi Stadium, Tehran, Iran	Iran	0–4	2026 FIFA World Cup qualification – AFC second round
2024
17	1 January 2024	Baniyas Stadium, Abu Dhabi, United Arab Emirates	China	2–1	Friendly
18	14 January 2024	Khalifa International Stadium, Al Rayyan, Qatar	United Arab Emirates	1–3	2023 AFC Asian Cup
19	19 January 2024	Khalifa International Stadium, Al Rayyan, Qatar	Iran	0–1	2023 AFC Asian Cup
20	23 January 2024	Abdullah bin Khalifa Stadium, Doha, Qatar	Palestine	0–3	2023 AFC Asian Cup
21	21 March 2024	Mong Kok Stadium, Mong Kok, Hong Kong	Uzbekistan	0–2	2026 FIFA World Cup qualification – AFC second round
22	26 March 2024	Milliy Stadium, Tashkent, Uzbekistan	Uzbekistan	0–3	2026 FIFA World Cup qualification – AFC second round
23	6 June 2024	Hong Kong Stadium, So Kon Po, Hong Kong	Iran	2–4	2026 FIFA World Cup qualification – AFC second round
24	11 June 2024	Ashgabat Stadium, Ashgabat, Turkmenistan	Turkmenistan	0–0	2026 FIFA World Cup qualification – AFC second round
25	5 September 2024	HFC Bank Stadium, Suva, Fiji	Solomon Islands	3–0	Friendly

== Honours ==
=== Club ===
Pegasus

- Hong Kong FA Cup: 2015–16

Lee Man

- Hong Kong Premier League: 2023–24
- Hong Kong League Cup: 2025–26

=== International ===
Hong Kong

- FIFA ASEAN Challenge Cup: 2026

=== Individual ===
- Best Young Player: 2019
