= Dhiego Martins =

Brazilian footballer (born 1988)

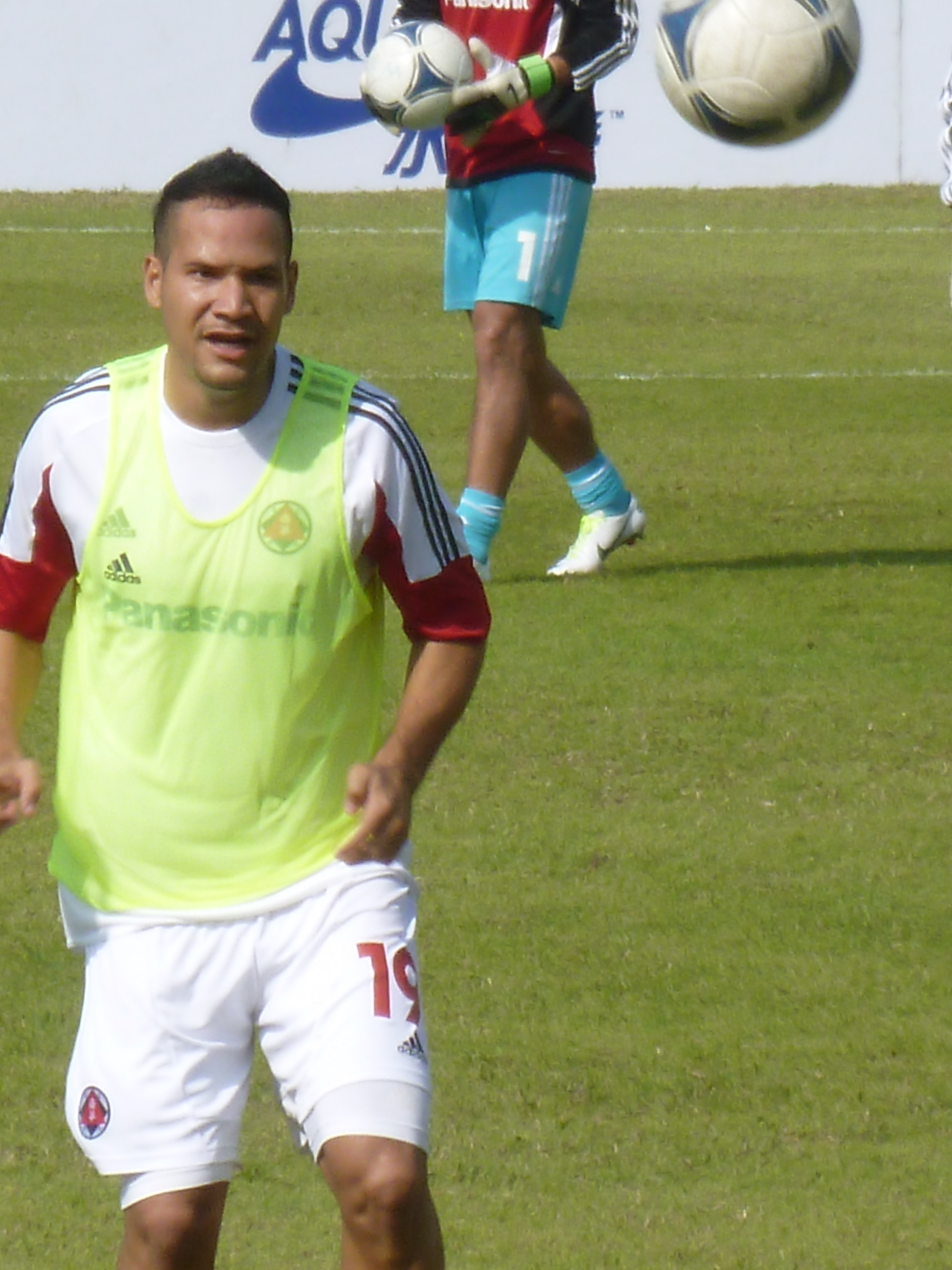

Personal information
- Full name: Dhiego de Souza Martins
- Date of birth: 27 August 1988 (age 38)
- Place of birth: Campo Mourão, Brazil
- Height: 1.78 m (5 ft 10 in)
- Positions: Striker; second striker

Senior career*
Years	Team	Apps	(Gls)
2009	Campo Mourão		
2010	Grêmio Maringá		
2010	Taquaritinga	9	(0)
2011	Operário PR	13	(3)
2011–2014	South China	52	(20)
2014–2015	Skënderbeu Korçë	29	(7)
2015	Inter Baku	15	(5)
2016–2017	Pegasus	19	(4)
2017–2018	Tai Po	15	(4)
2018–2020	Southern	20	(6)
- * Club domestic league appearances and goals as of 10 March 2020

Dhiego de Souza Martins (Chinese: 迪亞高 born 27 August 1988 in Brazil), simply known as Dhiego, is a former Brazilian professional footballer who played as a striker.

== Club career ==
=== South China ===
On 29 December 2011, South China announced that Dhiego Martins, alongside João Emir and Yeo Jee-hoon, had joined the club. He made his debut for South China on 4 February 2012 at Mong Kok Stadium, scoring two goals to help the team secure a 4–2 win over Sunray Cave JC Sun Hei.

=== Skënderbeu Korçë ===
In August 2014, Martins accepted a transfer move to the reigning Albanian champions, Skënderbeu Korçë.

=== Tai Po ===
In June 2017, Dhiego Martins was released by Pegasus and later signed with Tai Po.

=== Southern ===
On 26 May 2018, Dhiego Martin moved to fellow HKPL club Southern. On 1 June 2019, Southern announced that his contract would be renewed for a further season.

On 19 April 2020, due to circumstances brought on by the 2020 coronavirus pandemic, Southern bought out the remainder of Dhiego Martins' contract.

== Career statistics ==
As of 21 December 2015

Club	Season	League			National Cup		League Cup		Continental		Other		Total	
Club	Season	Division	Apps	Goals	Apps	Goals	Apps	Goals	Apps	Goals	Apps	Goals	Apps	Goals
South China	2011–12	Hong Kong First Division League	7	5	1	0	0	0	—		1	0	9	5
South China	2012–13	Hong Kong First Division League	13	6	4	1	—		—		1	0	18	7
South China	2013–14	Hong Kong First Division League	17	6	2	0	—		—		5	2	24	8
South China	Total		37	17	7	1	0	0	0	0	7	2	51	20
Skënderbeu Korçë	2014–15	Albanian Superliga	29	7	5	4	—		—		—		34	11
Inter Baku	2015–16	Azerbaijan Premier League	15	5	0	0	—		3	1	—		18	6
Career total			81	29	12	5	0	0	3	1	7	2	103	37
