= 2016–17 R&F (Hong Kong) season =

R&F (Hong Kong) 2016–17
- Chairman: Huang Shenghua (黄盛华)
- Manager: Li Zhihai (李志海)
- Stadium: Siu Sai Wan Sports Ground, Hong Kong
- Premier League: 10th
- Senior Shield: First Round
- FA Cup: First Round
- Sapling Cup: Quarter-finals
- Top goalscorer: League: Chuck Yiu Kwok (7 goals); All: Chuck Yiu Kwok (7 goals)
- Highest home attendance: 361
- Lowest home attendance: 100
- Average home league attendance: 207
Home colours	Away colours

The 2016–17 season was R&F's first season in the top-tier division in Hong Kong football. R&F competed in the Premier League, Senior Challenge Shield, FA Cup and Sapling Cup in this season.

On 1 August 2016, R&F (Hong Kong) was accepted to play in the Hong Kong Premier League with following conditions: (1) Signing at least eight Hong Kong players. (2) Using at least three Hong Kong players in a match. (3) Non-Chinese/Hong Kong player could not be registered in the club. (4) Sponsoring a cup competition with a fee of $1 million. The club finished their inaugural season in 10th place with 3 wins, 1 draw and 16 defeats in the 2016–17 Hong Kong Premier League, which secured to stay in the top flight for the next season.

== Coaching staff ==
Position	Staff
Head coach	(China) Li Zhihai
Team leader	(Hong Kong) Leung Chi Wing
Assistant coach	(Hong Kong) Leung Chi Wing
Team physician	(China) Chen Liang
Physiotherapist	(China) Liu Zhixing

== Squad ==
=== Summer ===
As of 4 September 2016

Note: Flags indicate national team as defined under FIFA eligibility rules; some limited exceptions apply. Players may hold more than one non-FIFA nationality.

No.	Pos.	Nation	Player
1	GK	(China) CHN	Long Wenhao
3	MF	(China) CHN	Xiang Wenjun
4	DF	(China) CHN	Yang Ting
5	DF	(China) CHN	Ye Ruiwen
6	MF	(China) CHN	Hou Junjie
7	FW	(Hong Kong) HKG	Chuck Yiu Kwok
8	MF	(China) CHN	Yang Ziyi
9	FW	(Hong Kong) HKG	Tsang Kin Fong
10	MF	(China) CHN	Min Junlin (captain)
11	DF	(China) CHN	Ni Bo
12	DF	(China) CHN	Li Lei
14	MF	(Hong Kong) HKG	Cheung Kwok Ming
15	MF	(Hong Kong) HKG	Lam Hin Ting
17	FW	(China) CHN	Chen Jiaqi

No.	Pos.	Nation	Player
18	DF	(China) CHN	Xiang Jiachi
19	DF	(China) CHN	Ma Weichao
21	FW	(Hong Kong) HKG	Lau Tak Yan
22	DF	(Hong Kong) HKG	Leung Ka Hai
23	MF	(China) CHN	He Zilin
24	DF	(China) CHN	Wei Zongren
25	DF	(Hong Kong) HKG	Lam Wan Kit
26	MF	(Hong Kong) HKG	Jing Teng
27	DF	(China) CHN	Bi Guanghuan
32	DF	(China) CHN	Zhong Ke
33	GK	(China) CHN	Xing Yu
37	MF	(China) CHN	Li Yuyang
44	DF	(China) CHN	Kuang Haokun
45	DF	(China) CHN	Liang Zhanhao

=== Winter ===
As of 1 April 2017

Note: Flags indicate national team as defined under FIFA eligibility rules; some limited exceptions apply. Players may hold more than one non-FIFA nationality.

No.	Pos.	Nation	Player
1	GK	(China) CHN	Long Wenhao
3	MF	(China) CHN	Xiang Wenjun
6	MF	(China) CHN	Hou Junjie
7	FW	(Hong Kong) HKG	Chuck Yiu Kwok
8	MF	(China) CHN	Yang Ziyi
9	FW	(Hong Kong) HKG	Tsang Kin Fong
11	MF	(China) CHN	Ning An
13	FW	(Hong Kong) HKG	Liang Zicheng
15	MF	(Hong Kong) HKG	Lam Hin Ting
16	DF	(China) CHN	Zhu Di
17	FW	(China) CHN	Chen Jiaqi
18	DF	(China) CHN	Xiang Jiachi
19	DF	(China) CHN	Ma Weichao
21	FW	(Hong Kong) HKG	Lau Tak Yan

No.	Pos.	Nation	Player
23	MF	(China) CHN	He Zilin
24	DF	(China) CHN	Wei Zongren
25	DF	(Hong Kong) HKG	Lam Wan Kit
26	MF	(Hong Kong) HKG	Jing Teng
29	FW	(Hong Kong) HKG	Chen Liming
30	DF	(China) CHN	Fu Yunlong
32	DF	(China) CHN	Zhong Ke
33	GK	(China) CHN	Xing Yu
35	FW	(China) CHN	Mai Jiajian
44	DF	(China) CHN	Kuang Haokun
55	DF	(China) CHN	Tu Dongxu (captain)
66	MF	(China) CHN	Huang Haoxuan
99	DF	(China) CHN	Wang Erduo

== Transfers ==
=== In ===
==== Summer ====
Squad number	Position	Player	Moving from	Type
7	FW	(Hong Kong) Chuck Yiu Kwok	(Hong Kong) Biu Chun Rangers	Free Transfer
8	MF	(China) Yang Ziyi	Free agent	
9	FW	(Hong Kong) Tsang Kin Fong	(Hong Kong) Yau Tsim Mong	Free Transfer
11	DF	(China) Ni Bo	Free agent	
14	MF	(Hong Kong) Cheung Kwok Ming	(Hong Kong) Kitchee	Free Transfer
15	MF	(Hong Kong) Lam Hin Ting	(Hong Kong) Chelsea FC Soccer School	Free Transfer
21	FW	(Hong Kong) Lau Tak Yan	(Hong Kong) Central & Western District	Free Transfer
22	DF	(Hong Kong) Leung Ka Hai	(Hong Kong) Kitchee	Loan
25	DF	(Hong Kong) Lam Wan Kit	(Hong Kong) Eastern District	Free Transfer
26	MF	(Hong Kong) Jing Teng	(Hong Kong) Yau Tsim Mong	Free Transfer
32	DF	(China) Zhong Ke	Free agent	

==== Winter ====
Squad number	Position	Player	Moving from	Type
11	MF	(China) Ning An	(China) Guangzhou R&F	
13	FW	(Hong Kong) Liang Zicheng	(Hong Kong) Southern District	
16	DF	(China) Zhu Di	(China) Guangzhou R&F Reserve team	
29	FW	(Hong Kong) Chen Liming	(Hong Kong) Wofoo Tai Po	
30	DF	(China) Fu Yunlong	(China) Guangzhou R&F Reserve team	
35	MF	(China) Mai Jiajian	(China) Guangzhou R&F Reserve team	
55	DF	(China) Tu Dongxu	(China) Guangzhou R&F Reserve team	
66	MF	(China) Huang Haoxuan	(China) Guangzhou R&F Reserve team	
99	DF	(China) Wang Erduo	(China) Guangzhou R&F Reserve team	

=== Out ===
==== Winter ====
Squad number	Position	Player	Moving to	Type
4	DF	(China) Yang Ting	(China) Guizhou Hengfeng Zhicheng	
5	DF	(China) Ye Ruiwen	(China) Guangzhou R&F Reserve team	
10	FW	(China) Min Junlin	(China) Guizhou Hengfeng Zhicheng	
11	DF	(China) Ni Bo	(China) Wuhan Zall Reserve team	Transfer
12	DF	(China) Li Lei	(China) Guangzhou R&F Reserve team	
14	MF	(Hong Kong) Cheung Kwok Ming	(Hong Kong) Biu Chun Glory Sky	
22	DF	(Hong Kong) Leung Ka Hai		Released
27	MF	(China) Bi Guanghuan	(China) Guangzhou R&F Reserve team	
37	MF	(China) Li Yuyang	(China) Guangzhou R&F	
45	DF	(China) Liang Zhanhao	(China) Guangzhou R&F	

== Pre-season and friendlies ==
=== Training matches ===
4 September 2016	(China) Guangzhou R&F	4 - 0	(Hong Kong) R&F	Guangzhou, Guangdong
	Zhang Chenlong ?'; Zeng Chao ?'; Lu Lin ?', ?'			Stadium: Yuexiushan Stadium

20 September 2016	(Hong Kong) R&F	1 - 1	(China) Hefei Guiguan	Foshan, Guangdong
	Chuck Yiu Kwok 55'		Li Longhu 70'	Stadium: Sanshui Baining Training Ground

27 December 2016	(China) Guangdong	2 - 0	(Hong Kong) R&F	Guangzhou, Guangdong
19:30 (UTC+8)	Lu Lin ?', ?'			Stadium: Guangdong Provincial People's Stadium

31 December 2016	(Hong Kong) R&F	0 - 9	(China) Meixian Techand	Foshan, Guangdong
				Stadium: Sanshui Baining Training Ground

21 January 2017	(Hong Kong) R&F	0 - 3	(China) Shijiazhuang Ever Bright	Foshan, Guangdong
				Stadium: Sanshui Baining Training Ground

== Competitions ==
Win Draw Loss

=== BOC Life Hong Kong Premier League ===
==== Table ====
Pos	Team	Pld	W	D	L	GF	GA	GD	Pts	Qualification or relegation
9	Biu Chun Glory Sky	20	2	4	14	24	55	−31	10	
10	(China) R&F	20	3	1	16	13	53	−40	10	
11	HKFC (R)	20	2	0	18	13	77	−64	6	Relegation to First Division

Updated to match(es) played on 6 May 2017. Source: Hong Kong Football Association
Rules for classification: 1) Points; 2) Head-to-head points; 3) Head-to-head goal difference; 4) Head-to-head goals scored; 5) Goal difference; 6) Goals scored; 7) Fair-play points; 8) Drawing lots (Play-off if the winner has to be decided)
(R) Relegated

==== Results by round ====
Round	1	2	3	4	5	6	7	8	9	10	11	12	13	14	15	16	17	18	19	20	21	22
Ground	-	A	A	A	H	H	H	H	A	A	H	A	-	A	A	A	H	H	H	H	A	H
Result	-	L	L	W	L	L	L	L	L	L	W	L	-	L	W	L	L	L	L	D	L	L
Position	7	8	10	9	8	10	10	10	10	10	9	9	9	9	9	9	9	9	9	9	9	10

Updated to match(es) played on 6 May 2017. Source: Competitive Matches
A = Away; H = Home; W = Win; D = Draw; L = Loss

==== Results summary ====
Overall								Home						Away					
Pld	W	D	L	GF	GA	GD	Pts	W	D	L	GF	GA	GD	W	D	L	GF	GA	GD
20	3	1	16	13	53	−40	10	1	1	8	3	25	−22	2	0	8	10	28	−18

Last updated: 6 May 2017.
Source: Competitive Matches

==== League Matches ====
24 September 2016 3	BC Glory Sky	2–0	R&F	Wong Tai Sin, Kowloon
14:30 (UTC+8)	Wellington (yellow card) 45+1'; Fabiani 61' (pen.); Yeung Chi Lun 71'; Liu Pui Fung (yellow card) 90'	Report	Xing Yu (yellow card) 60'	Stadium: Hammer Hill Road Sports Ground; Attendance: 405; Referee: Tong Kui Sum; Assistant referees: Amarjit Singh Sarao, Ng Wai Hong; Fourth official: Leung Chung Yin

30 September 2016 4	Hong Kong Pegasus	1–2	R&F	Wan Chai, Hong Kong
20:00 (UTC+8)	Wong Chun Ho (yellow card) 8'; Martins 19'; Kwok Kin Pong (yellow card) 32'; Naumovski (yellow card) 41'; Chan Pak Hang (yellow card) 60'; Martins (yellow card) 61'	Report	Ni Bo (yellow card) 4'; Yang Ting 31' (pen.); Xiang Jiachi 52'	Stadium: Hong Kong Stadium; Attendance: 649; Referee: Lau Fong Hei; Assistant referees: Cheng Oi Cho, Law Ming Leong; Fourth official: Tam Ping Wun

16 October 2016 5	R&F	1–4	KMB Yuen Long	Siu Sai Wan, Hong Kong
17:30 (UTC+8)	Li Lei (yellow card) 4'; Tsang Kin Fong (yellow card) 14'; Min Junlin (yellow card) 20'; Xiang Jiachi 33' (pen.); Yang Ting (yellow card) 45+1'	Report	Stefan 35' (pen.); Law Chun Ting (yellow card) 39'; Ticão (yellow card) 43'; Lau Ho Lam (yellow card) 45'; Fábio Lopes (yellow card) 45+1'; Yip Tsz Chun 57'; Diego Higino 65'; Ranđelović 69'	Stadium: Siu Sai Wan Sports Ground; Attendance: 204; Referee: Ng Chiu Kok; Assistant referees: Yu Kin Fung, Nelson Lee Chung Yin; Fourth official: Leung Chung Yin

23 October 2016 6	R&F	0–2	Wofoo Tai Po	Siu Sai Wan, Hong Kong
17:30 (UTC+8)	Xing Yu (yellow card) 32'; Chen Jiaqi (yellow card) 35'; Lam Hin Ting (yellow card) 65'; Ni Bo (red card) 90'; Yang Ting (yellow card) 90+2'	Report	Lucas Silva 32' (pen.); Lucas Silva (yellow card) 53'; Chan Cham Hei (yellow card) 62'; Lucas Silva 88'; Lee Ka Yiu (yellow card) 90+2'	Stadium: Siu Sai Wan Sports Ground; Attendance: 210; Referee: Tong Kui Sum; Assistant referees: Cheng Oi Cho, Wong Kei Hoi; Fourth official: Ng Wai Hong

1 November 2016 7	R&F	0–2	South China	Siu Sai Wan, Hong Kong
20:00 (UTC+8)	Yang Ziyi (yellow card) 26'; Min Junlin (yellow card) 35'; Hou Junjie (yellow card) 58'	Report	Chan Siu Ki 32'; Sean Tse 37'; Awal (yellow card) 81'	Stadium: Siu Sai Wan Sports Ground; Attendance: 339; Referee: Tang Hing Fu; Assistant referees: Sam Lam Nai Kei, Law Ming Leong; Fourth official: Law Bik Chi

20 November 2016 8	R&F	0–2	Kitchee	Siu Sai Wan, Hong Kong
14:30 (UTC+8)	Chuck Yiu Kwok (yellow card) 48'; Jing Teng (yellow card) 54'	Report	Zhi-Gin Lam 34'; Rufino 72'	Stadium: Siu Sai Wan Sports Ground; Attendance: 361; Referee: Ng Chiu Kok

26 November 2016 9	Kwoon Chung Southern	3–2	R&F	Aberdeen, Hong Kong
14:30 (UTC+8)	Lau Hok Ming (yellow card) 11'; Beto 42'; Wellingsson (yellow card) 60'; Yang Ting 64' (o.g.); Sham Kwok Fai 76'	Report	Min Junlin (yellow card) 57'; Chuck Yiu Kwok 80'; Ni Bo (yellow card) 82'; Chuck Yiu Kwok 90+2'; Chen Jiaqi (yellow card) 90+4'; Xing Yu (red card) After match	Stadium: Aberdeen Sports Ground; Attendance: 255; Referee: Ng Kai Lam

2 December 2016 10	Lee Man Rangers	1–0	R&F	Tsing Yi, New Territories
20:00 (UTC+8)	Clayton (yellow card) 19'; Clayton 60'	Report	Chuck Yiu Kwok (yellow card) 40'	Stadium: Tsing Yi Sports Ground; Attendance: 215; Referee: Ng Chiu Kok

8 December 2016 11	R&F	1–0	HKFC	Siu Sai Wan, Hong Kong
14:30 (UTC+8)	Chuck Yiu Kwok 7'; Yang Ziyi (yellow card) 62'	Report	Wylde (yellow card) 41'; McGurgan (yellow card) 60'; Gheczy (yellow card) 66'; Smith (yellow card) 79'	Stadium: Siu Sai Wan Sports Ground; Attendance: 155; Referee: Luk Kin Sun

8 January 2017 12	Kitchee	5–0	R&F	Mongkok, Kowloon
17:30 (UTC+8)	Sandro 5', 88'; Matt Lam 36'; Fernando 41' (yellow card) 75'; Alex Akande 76'; Matt Lam (yellow card) 79'	Report	Xiang Jiachi (yellow card) 55'	Stadium: Mong Kok Stadium; Attendance: 1,021; Referee: Ho Wai Sing

5 February 2017 14	Wofoo Tai Po	2–1	R&F	Tai Po, New Territories
14:30 (UTC+8)	Lucas Silva 7'; Lima (yellow card) 27'; Tan Chun Lok (yellow card) 34'; Wong Yiu Fu (yellow card) 50'; Dudu 82'	Report	Chuck Yiu Kwok 21'; Xiang Jiachi (yellow card) 34'; Jing Teng (yellow card) 64'; Zhong Ke (yellow card) 69'	Stadium: Tai Po Sports Ground; Attendance: 490; Referee: Tang Hing Fu

9 February 2017 2	Eastern Long Lions	6–1	R&F	Mongkok, Kowloon
20:00 (UTC+8)	Bleda 16'; Wong Tsz Ho (yellow card) 22'; Mitchell 24'; Bai He 29'; Bai He (yellow card) 29'; Mitchell (yellow card) 61'; Bleda 65'; Lee Hong Lim 71'; Mitchell 89'	Report	Chuck Yiu Kwok 34'; Hou Junjie (yellow card) 60'; Chen Liming (yellow card) 61'; Chuck Yiu Kwok (yellow card) 64'	Stadium: Mong Kok Stadium; Attendance: 682; Referee: Chan Ming Siu

17 February 2017 15	HKFC	3–4	R&F	Happy Valley, Hong Kong
14:30 (UTC+8)	Gheczy 70'; Man 78'; McGurgan (yellow card) 91'; Gheczy 90+8'	Report	Yang Ting 33'; Chuck Yiu Kwok 35'; Chen Liming 40'; Chuck Yiu Kwok 58'; Yang Ting (yellow card) 77'; Ning An (yellow card) 89'; Min Junlin (yellow card) 90+7'	Stadium: Hong Kong Football Club Stadium; Attendance: 304; Referee: Ho Wai Sing

24 February 2017 16	South China	1–0	R&F	Mongkok, Kowloon
20:00 (UTC+8)	Awal 33'; Chak Ting Fung (yellow card) 38'; Chu Siu Kei (yellow card) 80'; Leung Kwun Chung (yellow card) 81'; Perović (yellow card) 84'	Report	Huang Haoxuan (yellow card) 90+4'	Stadium: Mong Kok Stadium; Attendance: 432; Referee: Tang Hing Fu

5 March 2017 17	R&F	0–4	Eastern Long Lions	Siu Sai Wan, Hong Kong
17:30 (UTC+8)	Hou Junjie (yellow card) 84'	Report	Tsang Chi Hau (yellow card) 18'; Bleda 42'; Cheng Siu Wai 52'; Giovane 61'; Diego Eli (yellow card) 86'; Li Ka Chun 89'	Stadium: Siu Sai Wan Sports Ground; Attendance: 294; Referee: Tam Ping Wun

19 March 2017 18	R&F	1–3	Hong Kong Pegasus	Siu Sai Wan, Hong Kong
17:30 (UTC+8)	Tu Dongxu (yellow card) 37'; Fu Yunlong (yellow card) 54'; Chen Liming 77'; Xing Yu (yellow card) 82'; Yang Ziyi (yellow card) 90+2'	Report	Chan Siu Ki 13'; Martins (yellow card) 37'; João Emir (yellow card) 37'; Martins (red card) 40'; Leong Ka Hang 71'; Major 84' (pen.); Mbome (yellow card) 90'	Stadium: Siu Sai Wan Sports Ground; Attendance: 122; Referee: Ng Chiu Kok

1 April 2017 19	R&F	0–5	Kwoon Chung Southern	Siu Sai Wan, Hong Kong
14:30 (UTC+8)	Jing Teng (yellow card) 76'	Report	Marcos 7'; Uchida (yellow card) 45+1'; Marcos 67'; Marcos 75'; James Ha 85'; Ngue 90'	Stadium: Siu Sai Wan Sports Ground; Attendance: 147; Referee: Tang Hing Fu

8 April 2017 20	R&F	0–0	BC Glory Sky	Siu Sai Wan, Hong Kong
14:30 (UTC+8)	Chen Liming (yellow card) 44'	Report	Miović (yellow card) 48'; Teodorović (yellow card) 90'; Chan Cham Hei (yellow card) 90'	Stadium: Siu Sai Wan Sports Ground; Attendance: 134; Referee: Luk Kin Sun

22 April 2017 21	KMB Yuen Long	4–0	R&F	Yuen Long, New Territories
14:30 (UTC+8)	Ngan Lok Fung (yellow card) 8'; Yiu Ho Ming (yellow card) 29'; Ranđelović 44'; Diego Higino 79'; Lau Ka Ming 88'; Diego Higino 90+2'	Report	Hou Junjie (yellow card) 35'; Yang Ziyi (yellow card) 53'	Stadium: Yuen Long Stadium; Attendance: 592; Referee: Tam Ping Wun

6 May 2017 22	R&F	0–3	Lee Man Rangers	Siu Sai Wan, Hong Kong
14:30 (UTC+8)	Mai Jiajian (yellow card) 73'; Xiang Jiachi (yellow card) 76'; Zhong Ke (yellow card) 85'; Chen Jiaqi (yellow card) 87'	Report	Denis 40'; Wong Chun Hin 45+4'; Law Chun Yan (yellow card) 76'; Jordi Tarrés 81'	Stadium: Siu Sai Wan Sports Ground; Attendance: 100; Referee: So Kai Man

=== HKFA Canbo Senior Shield ===
18 September 2016 First round	R&F	0–1	BC Glory Sky	Yuen Long, New Territories
17:30 UTC+8	Li Lei (yellow card) 24'; Ni Bo (yellow card) 41'	Report	José María 25'; Raúl Fabiani (yellow card) 41'; Zhang Jun (yellow card) 59'; Lau Kwun Pong (yellow card) 81'; Yeung Chi Lun (yellow card) 90'	Stadium: Yuen Long Stadium; Attendance: 307; Referee: Chan Ming Siu

=== CODEX FA Cup ===
18 December 2016 First round	BC Glory Sky	1–0	R&F	Cheung Sha Wan, Kowloon
14:30 UTC+8	Rafael Wellington (yellow card) 75'; Tsui Wang Kit (yellow card) 80'; Everton Camargo 90'	Report	Min Junlin (yellow card) 32'; Yang Ting (yellow card) 41'; Min Junlin (yellow card) 59' (yellow-red card); Jing Teng (yellow card) 88'	Stadium: Sham Shui Po Sports Ground; Attendance: 358; Referee: Ho Wai Sing

=== R&F Properties Sapling Cup ===
12 February 2017 Quarter-finals	Eastern Long Lions	7–1	R&F	Mongkok, Kowloon
14:30 UTC+8	Lugo 23'; Xu Deshuai (yellow card) 28'; Giovane 38'; Lugo 56'; Lugo (yellow card) 59'; Giovane 61'; Cheng Siu Wai 72'; Li Ka Chun 75'; Lugo 84'	Report	Yang Ziyi (yellow card) 41'; Zhong Ke 51'	Stadium: Mong Kok Stadium; Attendance: 955; Referee: Luk Kin Sun

== Statistics ==
As of 6 May 2017

=== Appearances and goals ===
No.	Pos.	Player	Premier League			Senior Shield			FA Cup			Sapling Cup			Total		
No.	Pos.	Player	Apps.	Starts	Goals	Apps.	Starts	Goals	Apps.	Starts	Goals	Apps.	Starts	Goals	Apps.	Starts	Goals
1	GK	(China) Long Wenhao	10	10	0	1	1	0	0	0	0	0	0	0	11	11	0
3	MF	(China) Xiang Wenjun	2	1	0	0	0	0	1	0	0	0	0	0	3	1	0
6	MF	(China) Hou Junjie	16	16	0	1	1	0	0	0	0	1	1	0	18	18	0
7	FW	(Hong Kong) Chuck Yiu Kwok	17	14	7	0	0	0	1	1	0	0	0	0	18	15	7
8	MF	(China) Yang Ziyi	14	13	0	0	0	0	1	1	0	1	1	0	16	15	0
9	FW	(Hong Kong) Tsang Kin Fong	18	16	0	1	1	0	1	0	0	0	0	0	20	17	0
15	MF	(Hong Kong) Lam Hin Ting	8	6	0	1	0	0	1	0	0	1	1	0	11	7	0
17	FW	(China) Chen Jiaqi	16	15	0	1	1	0	1	1	0	1	1	0	19	18	0
18	DF	(China) Xiang Jiachi	16	11	2	0	0	0	1	1	0	1	0	0	18	12	2
19	DF	(China) Ma Weichao	6	5	0	0	0	0	1	1	0	1	0	0	8	6	0
21	FW	(Hong Kong) Lau Tak Yan	0	0	0	1	1	0	0	0	0	1	1	0	2	2	0
23	MF	(China) He Zilin	4	4	0	0	0	0	0	0	0	1	1	0	5	5	0
24	DF	(China) Wei Zongren	6	2	0	1	0	0	1	1	0	1	1	0	9	4	0
25	DF	(Hong Kong) Lam Wan Kit	10	4	0	1	0	0	0	0	0	1	1	0	12	5	0
26	MF	(Hong Kong) Jing Teng	10	7	0	0	0	0	1	1	0	0	0	0	11	8	0
32	MF	(China) Zhong Ke	7	3	0	0	0	0	0	0	0	1	1	1	8	4	1
33	GK	(China) Xing Yu	10	10	0	0	0	0	1	1	0	1	1	0	12	12	0
44	DF	(China) Kuang Haokun	1	0	0	0	0	0	0	0	0	1	0	0	2	0	0
Players who are left R&F that have appeared this season:
4	DF	(China) Yang Ting	10	10	2	1	1	0	1	1	0	0	0	0	12	12	2
10	MF	(China) Min Junlin	12	11	0	1	1	0	1	1	0	1	1	0	15	14	0
11	DF	(China) Ni Bo	7	7	0	1	1	0	0	0	0	0	0	0	8	8	0
12	DF	(China) Li Lei	3	3	0	1	1	0	0	0	0	0	0	0	4	4	0
14	MF	(Hong Kong) Cheung Kwok Ming	7	3	0	1	1	0	1	1	0	0	0	0	9	5	0
22	DF	(Hong Kong) Leung Ka Hai	1	1	0	1	1	0	0	0	0	0	0	0	2	2	0
27	MF	(China) Bi Guanghuan	2	0	0	0	0	0	0	0	0	0	0	0	2	0	0
37	MF	(China) Li Yuyang	6	3	0	0	0	0	0	0	0	0	0	0	6	3	0
45	DF	(China) Liang Zhanhao	2	2	0	0	0	0	0	0	0	0	0	0	2	2	0
Players who join R&F that have appeared this season:
11	MF	(China) Ning An	7	4	0	0	0	0	0	0	0	0	0	0	7	4	0
13	FW	(Hong Kong) Liang Zicheng	10	10	0	0	0	0	0	0	0	0	0	0	10	10	0
16	DF	(China) Zhu Di	3	0	0	0	0	0	0	0	0	0	0	0	3	0	0
29	FW	(Hong Kong) Chen Liming	10	8	2	0	0	0	0	0	0	0	0	0	10	8	2
30	DF	(China) Fu Yunlong	4	4	0	0	0	0	0	0	0	0	0	0	4	4	0
35	FW	(China) Mai Jiajian	4	4	0	0	0	0	0	0	0	0	0	0	4	4	0
55	DF	(China) Tu Dongxu	7	6	0	0	0	0	0	0	0	0	0	0	7	6	0
66	MF	(China) Huang Haoxuan	8	7	0	0	0	0	0	0	0	0	0	0	8	7	0
TOTALS					13			0			0			1			14

=== Goalscorers ===
Rank	Player	No.	Pos.	Premier League	Senior Shield	FA Cup	Sapling Cup	Total
1	(Hong Kong) Chuck Yiu Kwok	7	FW	7	0	0	0	7
2	(China) Xiang Jiachi	18	DF	2	0	0	0	2
2	(China) Yang Ting	4	DF	2	0	0	0	2
2	(Hong Kong) Chen Liming	29	FW	2	0	0	0	2
5	(China) Zhong Ke	32	DF	0	0	0	1	1
TOTALS				13	0	0	1	14
