= 2018–19 R&F (Hong Kong) season =

R&F (Hong Kong) 2018–19
- Chairman: Huang Shenghua (黄盛华)
- Manager: Yeung Ching Kwong (楊正光)
- Stadium: Yanzigang Stadium, Guangzhou
- Premier League: 2nd
- Senior Shield: Semi-finals
- FA Cup: Quarter-finals
- Sapling Cup: Group stage
Home colours	Away colours

The 2018–19 season is R&F's 3rd season in the top-tier division in Hong Kong football. R&F will compete in the Premier League, Senior Challenge Shield, FA Cup and Sapling Cup in this season.

== Coaching staff ==
Position	Staff
Head coach	(Hong Kong) Yeung Ching Kwong
Team leader	(China) Wu Weian
Assistant coach	(China) Wu Weian
Assistant coach	(Croatia) Mirko Renic
Goalkeeping coach	(Scotland) Andy McNeil
Team physician	(China) Liu Yihao
Physiotherapist	(China) Liu Zhixing

== Squad ==
=== Summer ===
As of 5 October 2018

Note: Flags indicate national team as defined under FIFA eligibility rules; some limited exceptions apply. Players may hold more than one non-FIFA nationality.

No.	Pos.	Nation	Player
1	GK	(China) CHN	Ji Xiangzheng
3	DF	(Hong Kong) HKG	Lin Junsheng
4	MF	(Hong Kong) HKG	Bai He
5	DF	(Hong Kong) HKG	Vas Núñez
6	MF	(China) CHN	Hou Junjie
7	MF	(Germany) GER	Zhi-Gin Lam ^{LP}
8	MF	(China) CHN	Wu Weian
10	MF	(Hong Kong) HKG	Itaparica
11	MF	(Hong Kong) HKG	Lo Kong Wai
12	MF	(Hong Kong) HKG	Lo Kwan Yee
13	GK	(China) CHN	Zhou Yuchen
14	MF	(China) CHN	Ning An
15	DF	(Hong Kong) HKG	Roberto (Captain)
16	MF	(Hong Kong) HKG	Tan Chun Lok
17	FW	(Hong Kong) HKG	Paulinho

No.	Pos.	Nation	Player
21	DF	(China) CHN	Liang Yongfeng
22	FW	(Hong Kong) HKG	Giovane
24	DF	(Hong Kong) HKG	Leung Nok Hang
25	FW	(Brazil) BRA	Tiago Leonço ^{FP}
30	MF	(Republic of Ireland) IRL	Sean Tse ^{LP}
32	FW	(Hong Kong) HKG	Yuen Chun Sing
33	MF	(China) CHN	Wang Xinhui
35	FW	(Hong Kong) HKG	Godfred Karikari
60	DF	(Croatia) CRO	Saša Novaković ^{FP}
77	MF	(Hong Kong) HKG	Mak Fu Shing
88	DF	(Hong Kong) HKG	Li Cheuk Hon
97	MF	(China) CHN	Chen Fuhai
98	GK	(China) CHN	Chen Zirong
99	MF	(Hong Kong) HKG	Tsang Tung Ming

Remarks:
^{LP} These players are considered as local players in Hong Kong domestic football competitions.
^{FP} These players are registered as foreign players.

=== Winter ===
As of 16 February 2019

Note: Flags indicate national team as defined under FIFA eligibility rules; some limited exceptions apply. Players may hold more than one non-FIFA nationality.

No.	Pos.	Nation	Player
1	GK	(China) CHN	Ji Xiangzheng
3	DF	(Hong Kong) HKG	Lin Junsheng
4	MF	(Hong Kong) HKG	Bai He
5	DF	(Hong Kong) HKG	Vas Núñez
6	MF	(China) CHN	Hou Junjie
7	MF	(Germany) GER	Zhi-Gin Lam ^{LP}
8	MF	(China) CHN	Wu Weian
10	MF	(Hong Kong) HKG	Itaparica
11	FW	(Hong Kong) HKG	Lo Kong Wai
12	DF	(Hong Kong) HKG	Lo Kwan Yee
13	GK	(China) CHN	Zhou Yuchen
14	MF	(China) CHN	Ning An
15	DF	(Hong Kong) HKG	Roberto (Captain)
16	MF	(Hong Kong) HKG	Tan Chun Lok
17	FW	(Hong Kong) HKG	Paulinho

No.	Pos.	Nation	Player
18	MF	(Ivory Coast) CIV	Serges Déblé ^{FP}
21	DF	(China) CHN	Liang Yongfeng
22	FW	(Hong Kong) HKG	Giovane
24	DF	(Hong Kong) HKG	Leung Nok Hang
25	FW	(Brazil) BRA	Tiago Leonço ^{FP}
30	MF	(Republic of Ireland) IRL	Sean Tse ^{LP}
35	FW	(Hong Kong) HKG	Godfred Karikari
60	DF	(Croatia) CRO	Saša Novaković ^{FP}
66	MF	(China) CHN	Yu Zeping
77	MF	(Hong Kong) HKG	Mak Fu Shing
88	DF	(Hong Kong) HKG	Li Cheuk Hon
97	MF	(China) CHN	Chen Fuhai
98	GK	(China) CHN	Chen Zirong
99	MF	(Hong Kong) HKG	Tsang Tung Ming

Remarks:
^{LP} These players are considered as local players in Hong Kong domestic football competitions.
^{FP} These players are registered as foreign players.

== Transfers ==
=== In ===
==== Summer ====
Squad number	Position	Player	Moving from	Type

==== Winter ====
Squad number	Position	Player	Moving from	Type

=== Out ===
==== Summer ====
Squad number	Position	Player	Moving to	Type
7	MF	(China) Deng Yanlin	(China) Guangzhou R&F Reserve team	Loan return
12	GK	(China) Zhou Yuchen	(China) Shandong Luneng Taishan Reserve team	Loan return
13	MF	(China) Chen Fuhai	(China) Guangzhou R&F Reserve team	Loan return
14	MF	(China) Zhang Jiajie	(China) Guangzhou R&F	Loan return
17	MF	(China) Yang Ziyi		Release
18	DF	(China) Liang Yongfeng	(China) Guangzhou R&F Reserve team	Loan return
19	FW	(Hong Kong) Tsang Kin Fong	(Sweden) Råslätts SK	Release
27	DF	(China) Zhong Ke	(China) Meixian Techand Reserve team	Transfer
28	MF	(Hong Kong) Chow Cheuk Fung	(Hong Kong) Rangers	Release
77	FW	(China) Li Rui	(China) Guangzhou R&F	Transfer

==== Winter ====
Squad number	Position	Player	Moving to	Type

== Competitions ==
Win Draw Loss

=== Hong Kong Premier League ===
==== Table ====
Pos	Team	Pld	W	D	L	GF	GA	GD	Pts	Qualification or relegation
1	Tai Po (C)	18	12	5	1	43	22	+21	41	Qualification for AFC Champions League preliminary round 2 (Note: If the league champions cannot qualify for the AFC Champions League group stage, they will enter the AFC Cup group stage.)
2	(China) R&F (Note: R&F are not a full member of the Hong Kong Football Association and are not eligible to represent Hong Kong in the AFC club competitions.)	18	11	3	4	51	26	+25	36	
3	Southern	18	9	5	4	30	24	+6	32 (Note: Head-to head results for teams with 32 points: Southern 4 points; Kitchee 1 point.)	
4	Kitchee	18	9	5	4	44	20	+24	32	Qualification for AFC Cup play-off round (Note: Kitchee qualified for the AFC Cup play-off round as Hong Kong FA Cup winners.)
5	Eastern	18	8	7	3	38	21	+17	31	

Source: Hong Kong Football Association
Rules for classification: 1) Points; 2) Head-to-head points; 3) Head-to-head goal difference; 4) Head-to-head goals scored; 5) Goal difference; 6) Goals scored; 7) Fair-play points; 8) Drawing lots (Play-off if the winner has to be decided).
(C) Champions

==== Results by round ====
Round	1	2	3	4	5	6	7	8	9	10	11	12	13	14	15	16	17	18
Ground																		
Result																		
Position																		

Updated to match(es) played on 13 May 2018. Source: Competitive Matches
A = Away; H = Home; W = Win; D = Draw; L = Loss

==== Results summary ====
Overall								Home						Away					
Pld	W	D	L	GF	GA	GD	Pts	W	D	L	GF	GA	GD	W	D	L	GF	GA	GD
0	0	0	0	0	0	0	0	0	0	0	0	0	0	0	0	0	0	0	0

Last updated: 13 May 2018.
Source: Competitive Matches
