= Li Yuyang =

Chinese footballer

Li Yuyang 黎宇扬
Personal information
- Full name: Li Yuyang
- Date of birth: 24 September 1997 (age 29)
- Place of birth: Guangzhou, Guangdong, China
- Height: 1.74 m (5 ft 9 in)
- Position: Forward

Team information
- Current team: Guangzhou R&F
- Number: 37

Youth career
- Guangzhou R&F

Senior career*
Years	Team	Apps	(Gls)
2016–	Guangzhou R&F	13	(0)
2016	→ R&F (Hong Kong) (loan)	6	(0)
- * Club domestic league appearances and goals as of 31 December 2020

Li Yuyang (simplified Chinese: 黎宇扬; traditional Chinese: 黎宇揚; pinyin: Lí Yǔyáng; Mandarin pronunciation: [lǐ ỳ jǎŋ]; born 24 September 1997) is a Chinese footballer who plays for Chinese Super League side Guangzhou R&F.

== Club career ==
Li Yuyang was promoted to Chinese Super League side Guangzhou R&F first team squad by manager Dragan Stojković in 2016. In August 2016, he was loaned to Hong Kong Premier League side R&F, which was the satellite team of Guangzhou R&F. He made his senior debut on 23 October 2016 in a 2–0 home defeat against Wofoo Tai Po, coming on as a substitute for Min Junlin in the 46th minute. Li returned to Guangzhou R&F in January 2017. On 10 March 2018, he made his debut for the club in a 2–0 home win over Dalian Yifang, coming on as a substitute for Xiao Zhi in the 89th minute.

== Career statistics ==
Statistics accurate as of match played 31 December 2020.

Appearances and goals by club, season and competition
Club	Season	League			National Cup		League Cup		Continental		Total	
Club	Season	Division	Apps	Goals	Apps	Goals	Apps	Goals	Apps	Goals	Apps	Goals
Guangzhou R&F	2016	Chinese Super League	0	0	0	0	-		-		0	0
Guangzhou R&F	2017	Chinese Super League	0	0	0	0	-		-		0	0
Guangzhou R&F	2018	Chinese Super League	3	0	0	0	-		-		3	0
Guangzhou R&F	2019	Chinese Super League	10	0	0	0	-		-		10	0
Guangzhou R&F	Total		13	0	0	0	0	0	0	0	13	0
R&F (Hong Kong)	2016–17	Hong Kong Premier League	6	0	0	0	0	0	-		6	0
Career total			19	0	0	0	0	0	0	0	19	0
