= Yang Ting =

Chinese footballer

Yang Ting 杨挺
Personal information
- Full name: Yang Ting
- Date of birth: 4 June 1993 (age 33)
- Place of birth: Leshan, Sichuan, China
- Height: 1.83 m (6 ft 0 in)
- Position: Defender

Youth career
- Chengdu Blades

Senior career*
Years	Team	Apps	(Gls)
2012–2014	Chengdu Blades	56	(1)
2015	Tubize	1	(0)
2016–2017	Guangzhou R&F	0	(0)
2016–2017	→ R&F (loan)	10	(2)
2017	→ Guizhou Hengfeng (loan)	15	(0)
2018–2020	Guizhou Hengfeng	46	(3)
2021–2023	Chengdu Rongcheng	1	(0)
2023	→ Chongqing Tonglianglong (loan)	10	(0)
- * Club domestic league appearances and goals as of 8 January 2023

Yang Ting (Chinese: 杨挺; pinyin: Yáng Tǐng; Mandarin pronunciation: [jǎŋ tʰìŋ]; born 4 June 1993) is a Chinese former footballer who played as defender.

== Club career ==
Yang Ting started his professional football career in 2012 when he was promoted to China League One side Chengdu Blades's first team squad. He made his senior debut on 27 June 2012 in the third round of 2012 Chinese FA Cup against Jiangsu Sainty. He made his league debut on 1 July 2012 in a league match against Chongqing FC and scored his first senior goal in the match, which ensured Chengdu's 2–1 win. Yang became a regular starter of the club after his debut, playing 56 league matches for Chengdu between 2012 and 2014 season.

Yang transferred to Belgian Second Division side Tubize in February 2015 after Chengdu's dissolution. On 15 August 2015, he made his debut for Tubize in the fourth round of 2015–16 Belgian Cup against Charleroi-Marchienne. His league debut came on 17 October 2015, in a 6–1 away win against Heist, coming on for Andrei Camargo in the 81st minute.

Yang joined Chinese Super League side Guangzhou R&F in December 2015. On 10 May 2016, he made his debut for Guangzhou in the third round of 2016 Chinese FA Cup against Hainan Boying & Seamen. In August 2016, he was loaned to Hong Kong Premier League side R&F, which was the satellite team of Guangzhou R&F. He made his debut on 18 September 2016 in the 2016–17 Hong Kong Senior Challenge Shield against BC Glory Sky. He scored his first goal for the club on 30 September 2016, in a 2–1 away win against Hong Kong Pegasus. He scored another goal on 17 February 2017, in a 4–3 away win against Hong Kong FC.

On 24 February 2017, Yang was loaned to Super League newcomer Guizhou Hengfeng for one season. He made his debut for Guizhou on 22 April 2017 in a 2–0 home defeat against Shanghai Shenhua. On 3 May 2017, he scored his first goal for the club in a 5–3 away defeat against Shanghai Shenxin in the 2017 Chinese FA Cup. At the end of the 2017 season, Yang went on to make 16 appearances for the club in all competitions. He made a permanent transfer to Guizhou Hengfeng on 9 February 2018, signing a three-year contract. With his contract ending he was free to join Chengdu Rongcheng on 3 August 2021. He would have to wait until the following season to make his debut, which was in the 2022 Chinese FA Cup against Hebei on 16 November 2022 in a 3-0 victory.

== Career statistics ==
As of 8 January 2023.

Appearances and goals by club, season and competition
Club	Season	League			National Cup		League Cup		Continental		Total	
Club	Season	Division	Apps	Goals	Apps	Goals	Apps	Goals	Apps	Goals	Apps	Goals
Chengdu Blades	2012	China League One	14	1	2	0	-		-		16	1
Chengdu Blades	2013	China League One	19	0	1	0	-		-		20	0
Chengdu Blades	2014	China League One	23	0	0	0	-		-		23	0
Chengdu Blades	Total		56	1	3	0	0	0	0	0	59	1
Tubize	2014–15	Belgian Second Division	0	0	0	0	-		-		0	0
Tubize	2015–16	Belgian Second Division	1	0	1	0	-		-		2	0
Tubize	Total		1	0	1	0	0	0	0	0	2	0
Guangzhou R&F	2016	Chinese Super League	0	0	1	0	-		-		1	0
R&F (loan)	2016–17	Hong Kong Premier League	10	2	1	0	1 (Note: Appearances in Hong Kong Senior Challenge Shield)	0	-		12	2
Guizhou Hengfeng (loan)	2017	Chinese Super League	15	0	1	1	-		-		16	1
Guizhou Hengfeng	2018	Chinese Super League	16	0	1	0	-		-		17	0
Guizhou Hengfeng	2019	China League One	25	3	0	0	-		-		25	3
Guizhou Hengfeng	2020	China League One	5	0	0	0	-		-		5	0
Guizhou Hengfeng	Total		46	3	1	0	0	0	0	0	47	3
Chengdu Rongcheng	2021	China League One	0	0	0	0	-		0 (Note: Appearance(s) in CSL Relegation play-offs)	0	0	0
Chengdu Rongcheng	2022	Chinese Super League	1	0	4	0	-		-		5	0
Chengdu Rongcheng	Total		1	0	4	0	0	0	0	0	5	0
Career total			129	6	12	1	1	0	0	0	142	7
