= Chen Jiaqi =

Chinese footballer

Chen Jiaqi 陈佳奇
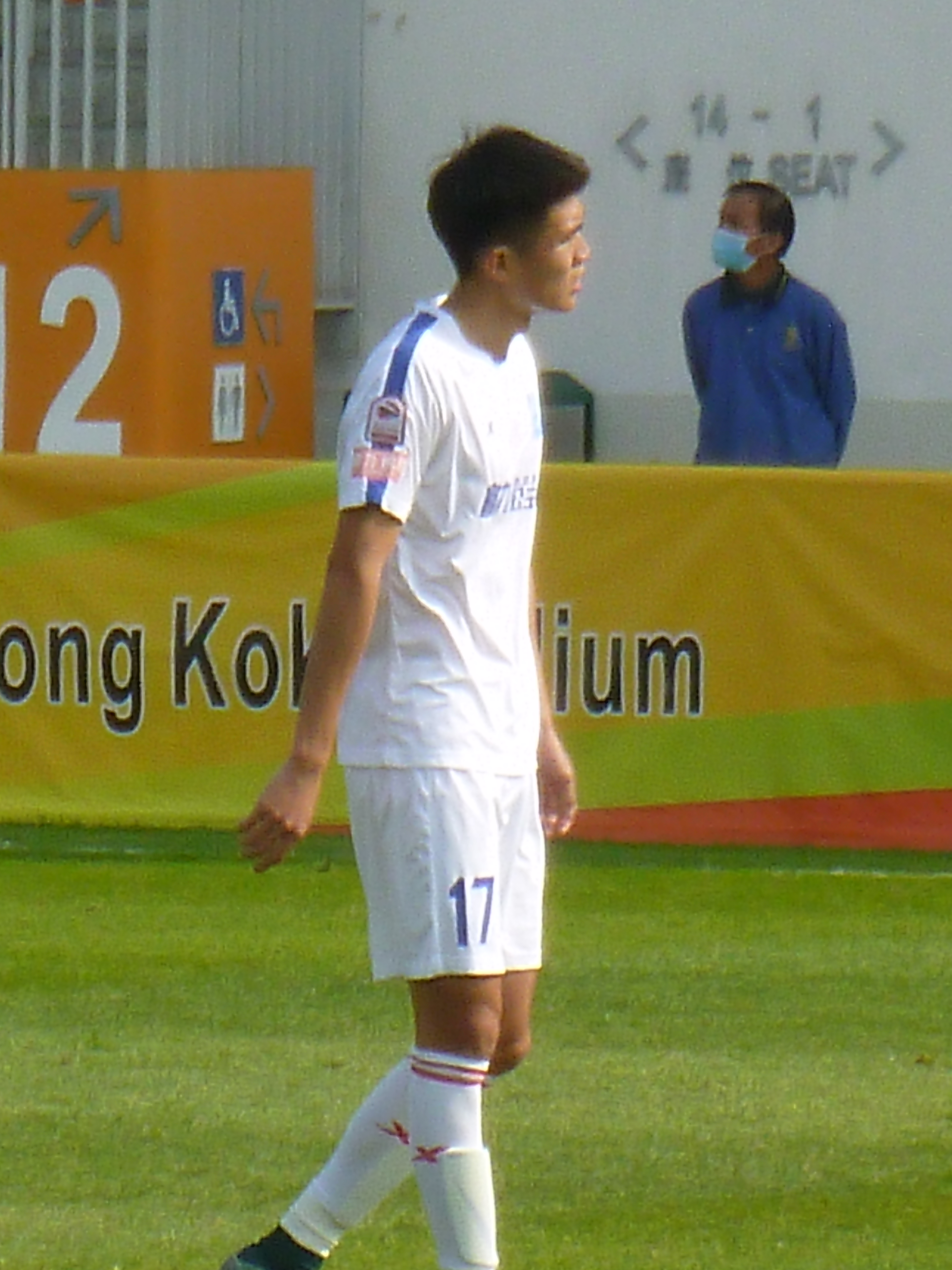

Personal information
- Full name: Chen Jiaqi
- Birth name: Chen Qi
- Date of birth: 4 September 1992 (age 34)
- Place of birth: Shanghai, China
- Height: 1.93 m (6 ft 4 in)
- Position: Forward

Team information
- Current team: Hubei Istar
- Number: 17

Youth career
- Guangdong Youth
- 2013: Guangzhou R&F

Senior career*
Years	Team	Apps	(Gls)
2011–2012	Guangdong Youth	41	(10)
2014–2017	Guangzhou R&F	0	(0)
2016–2017	→ R&F (loan)	16	(0)
2017	→ Lhasa UCI (loan)	-	(-)
2018–2025	Qingdao Hainiu	98	(29)
2023	→ Chongqing Tonglianglong (loan)	21	(8)
2024	→ Qingdao Red Lions (loan)	11	(3)
2024	→ Dalian K'un City (loan)	13	(2)
2025	→ Dalian K'un City (loan)	14	(0)
2026–	Hubei Istar	0	(0)
- * Club domestic league appearances and goals as of 8 March 2026

Chen Jiaqi (simplified Chinese: 陈佳奇; traditional Chinese: 陳佳奇; pinyin: Chén Jiāqí; born 2 September 1992), former name Chen Qi (Chinese: 陈琦; pinyin: Chén Qí), is a Chinese footballer who plays as a forward for China League Two club Hubei Istar.

== Club career ==
=== Guangzhou R&F ===
Chen Jiaqi started his professional football career in 2011 when he was promoted to Guangdong Youth's squad for the 2011 China League Two campaign. He joined Chinese Super League side Guangzhou R&F in 2013 and was promoted to the first team by Sven-Göran Eriksson in 2014. Failing to establish himself with the team, he was loaned to Hong Kong Premier League side R&F, which was the satellite team of Guangzhou R&F, in August 2016. He made his debut on 18 September 2016 in the 2016–17 Hong Kong Senior Challenge Shield against BC Glory Sky. His league debut came on 24 September 2016 in a 2–0 away defeat against BC Glory Sky.

=== Qingdao Hainiu ===
On 8 February 2018, Chen transferred to China League Two side Qingdao Jonoon. He would be part of the squad as the club re-branded themselves as Qingdao Hainiu. He would go on to play a vital part as the club won the third tier title and promotion at the end of the 2021 China League Two season. He would go on to achieve successive promotions as he helped guide the club to second in the 2022 China League One season and promotion back into the top tier.

== Career statistics ==
As of 25 December 2022.

Appearances and goals by club, season and competition
Club	Season	League			National Cup		League Cup		Continental		Other		Total	
Club	Season	Division	Apps	Goals	Apps	Goals	Apps	Goals	Apps	Goals	Apps	Goals	Apps	Goals
Guangdong Youth	2011	China League Two	19	7	-		-		-		-		19	7
Guangdong Youth	2012	China League Two	22	3	2	2	-		-		-		24	5
Guangdong Youth	Total		41	10	2	2	0	0	0	0	0	0	43	12
Guangzhou R&F	2014	Chinese Super League	0	0	0	0	-		-		-		0	0
R&F (loan)	2016–17	Hong Kong Premier League	16	0	1	0	1 (Note: Appearance(s) in Hong Kong Senior Challenge Shield)	0	-		1 (Note: Appearance(s) in Hong Kong Sapling Cup)	0	19	0
Lhasa UCI (loan)	2017	China Amateur League	-		-		-		-		-		-	-
Qingdao Jonoon/ Qingdao Hainiu	2018	China League Two	26	6	1	0	-		-		-		27	6
Qingdao Jonoon/ Qingdao Hainiu	2019	China League Two	26	9	1	0	-		-		-		27	9
Qingdao Jonoon/ Qingdao Hainiu	2020	China League Two	7	3	-		-		-		-		7	3
Qingdao Jonoon/ Qingdao Hainiu	2021	China League Two	24	8	0	0	-		-		-		24	8
Qingdao Jonoon/ Qingdao Hainiu	2022	China League One	15	3	2	1	-		-		-		17	4
Qingdao Jonoon/ Qingdao Hainiu	Total		98	29	4	1	0	0	0	0	0	0	61	18
Career total			155	39	7	3	1	0	0	0	1	0	164	42

== Honours ==
=== Club ===
Qingdao Hainiu

- China League Two: 2021
