= Tu Dongxu =

Chinese footballer

Tu Dongxu 涂东旭
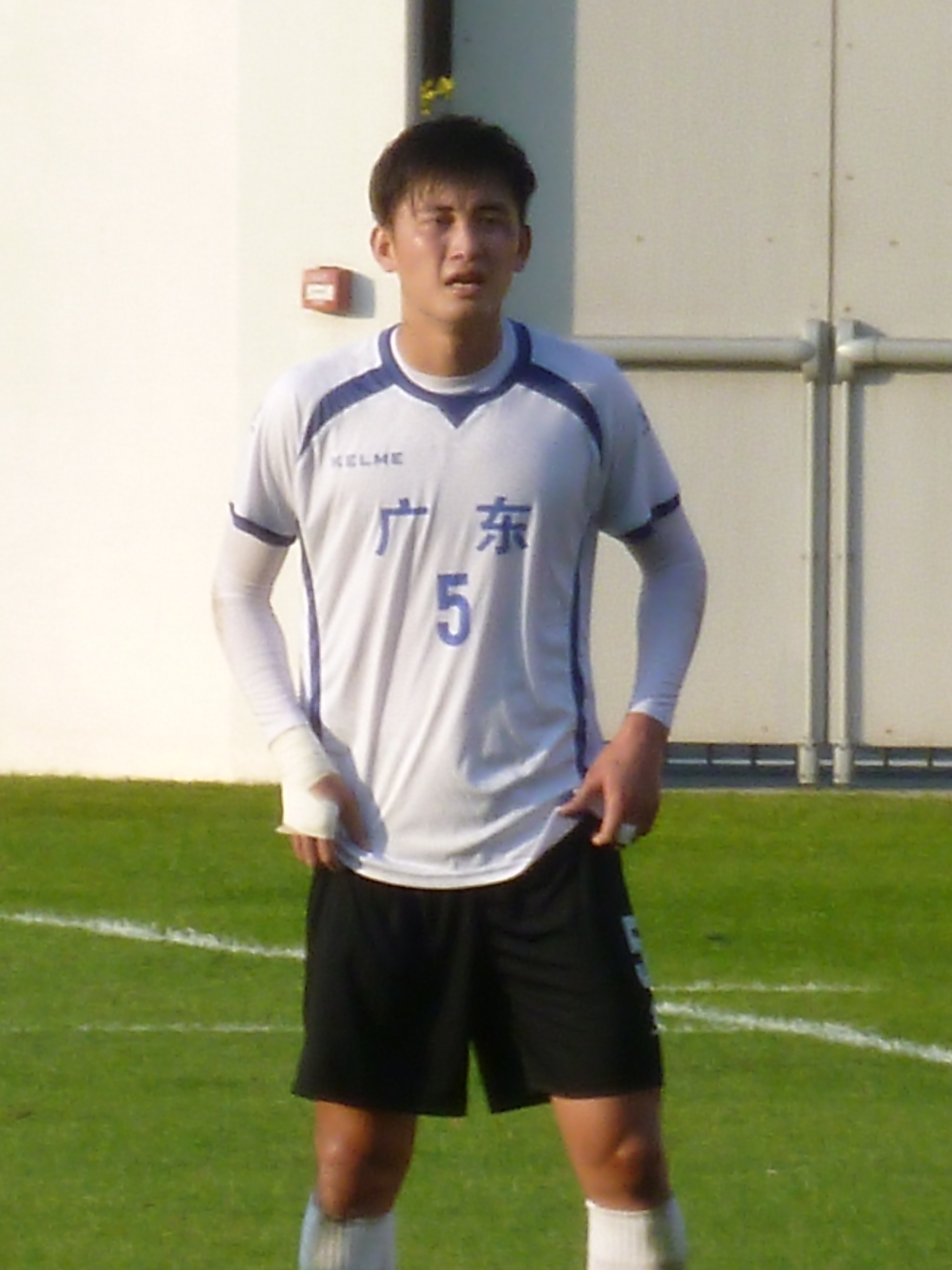

Personal information
- Full name: Tu Dongxu
- Date of birth: 13 November 1991 (age 34)
- Place of birth: Guangzhou, Guangdong, China
- Height: 1.85 m (6 ft 1 in)
- Position: Defender

Youth career
- Guangzhou Youth
- 2016–2017: Guangzhou R&F

Senior career*
Years	Team	Apps	(Gls)
2010–2014	Guangzhou Evergrande	0	(0)
2013	→ Meizhou Hakka (loan)	7	(0)
2014	→ Guangdong Sunray Cave (loan)	6	(0)
2015	Meizhou Hakka	7	(1)
2017	R&F	7	(0)
2017–2019	Meixian Techand	39	(3)
2019–2021	Kunshan FC	23	(1)
2022	Heilongjiang Ice City	14	(2)
2023	Shanghai Jiading Huilong	27	(2)
2024–2025	Guangdong GZ-Power	27	(4)
- * Club domestic league appearances and goals as of 14 March 2026

Tu Dongxu (Chinese: 涂东旭; pinyin: Tú Dōngxù; born 13 November 1991) is a Chinese retired footballer who played as defender.

== Club career ==
Tu Dongxu started his professional football career in 2010 when he was promoted to Guangzhou Evergrande's squad for the 2010 China League One campaign. On 18 July 2012, he made his senior debut in the fourth round of 2012 Chinese FA Cup against Henan Jianye. Failing to establish himself within the first team, Tu was loaned to China League Two side Meizhou Hakka in 2013 and China League One side Guangdong Sunray Cave in 2014. Tu moved to Meizhou Hakka on free transfer in January 2015.

Tu joined Chinese Super League side Guangzhou R&F in February 2016. He played for Guangzhou R&F reserve team in the 2016 season. Tu was loaned to Hong Kong Premier League side R&F, which was the satellite team of Guangzhou R&F, in February 2017. He made his debut on 18 February 2017 in a 4–3 away win against Hong Kong FC. He was appointed as team captain in late February after Min Junlin left the club. Tu terminated his contract with the club in the summer of 2017.

Tu signed for China League Two side Meixian Techand in July 2017. On 29 July 2017, he scored his first goal for the club in a 3–1 win over Chengdu Qbao. He made 11 appearances and scored once in the 2017 season as Meixian Techand won promotion to the China League One.

== Career statistics ==
As of 31 December 2020.

Appearances and goals by club, season and competition
Club	Season	League			National Cup		League Cup		Continental		Other		Total	
Club	Season	Division	Apps	Goals	Apps	Goals	Apps	Goals	Apps	Goals	Apps	Goals	Apps	Goals
Guangzhou Evergrande	2010	China League One	0	0	-		-		-		-		0	0
Guangzhou Evergrande	2011	Chinese Super League	0	0	0	0	-		-		0	0	0	0
Guangzhou Evergrande	2012	Chinese Super League	0	0	1	0	-		0	0	0	0	1	0
Guangzhou Evergrande	Total		0	0	1	0	0	0	0	0	0	0	1	0
Meizhou Hakka (loan)	2013	China League Two	7	0	-		-		-		-		7	0
Guangdong Sunray Cave (loan)	2014	China League One	6	0	1	0	-		-		-		7	0
Meizhou Hakka	2015	China League Two	12	1	2	0	-		-		-		14	1
R&F	2016–17	Hong Kong Premier League	7	0	0	0	0 (Note: Appearances in Hong Kong Senior Challenge Shield)	0	-		0 (Note: Appearances in Hong Kong Sapling Cup)	0	7	0
Meixian Techand	2017	China League Two	11	1	0	0	-		-		-		11	1
Meixian Techand	2018	China League One	24	2	1	0	-		-		2 (Note: Appearances in China League One play-offs)	0	27	2
Meixian Techand	2019	China League One	2	0	1	0	-		-		-		3	0
Meixian Techand	Total		37	3	2	0	0	0	0	0	0	0	39	3
Kunshan FC	2019	China League Two	17	1	0	0	-		-		-		17	1
Kunshan FC	2020	China League One	5	0	1	0	-		-		-		6	0
Kunshan FC	Total		22	1	1	0	0	0	0	0	0	0	23	0
Career total			91	5	7	0	0	0	0	0	2	0	100	5

== Honours ==
=== Club ===
Guangzhou Evergrande

- Chinese Super League: 2011, 2012
- China League One: 2010
- Chinese FA Cup: 2012
