= Lam Wan Kit =

Hong Kong footballer

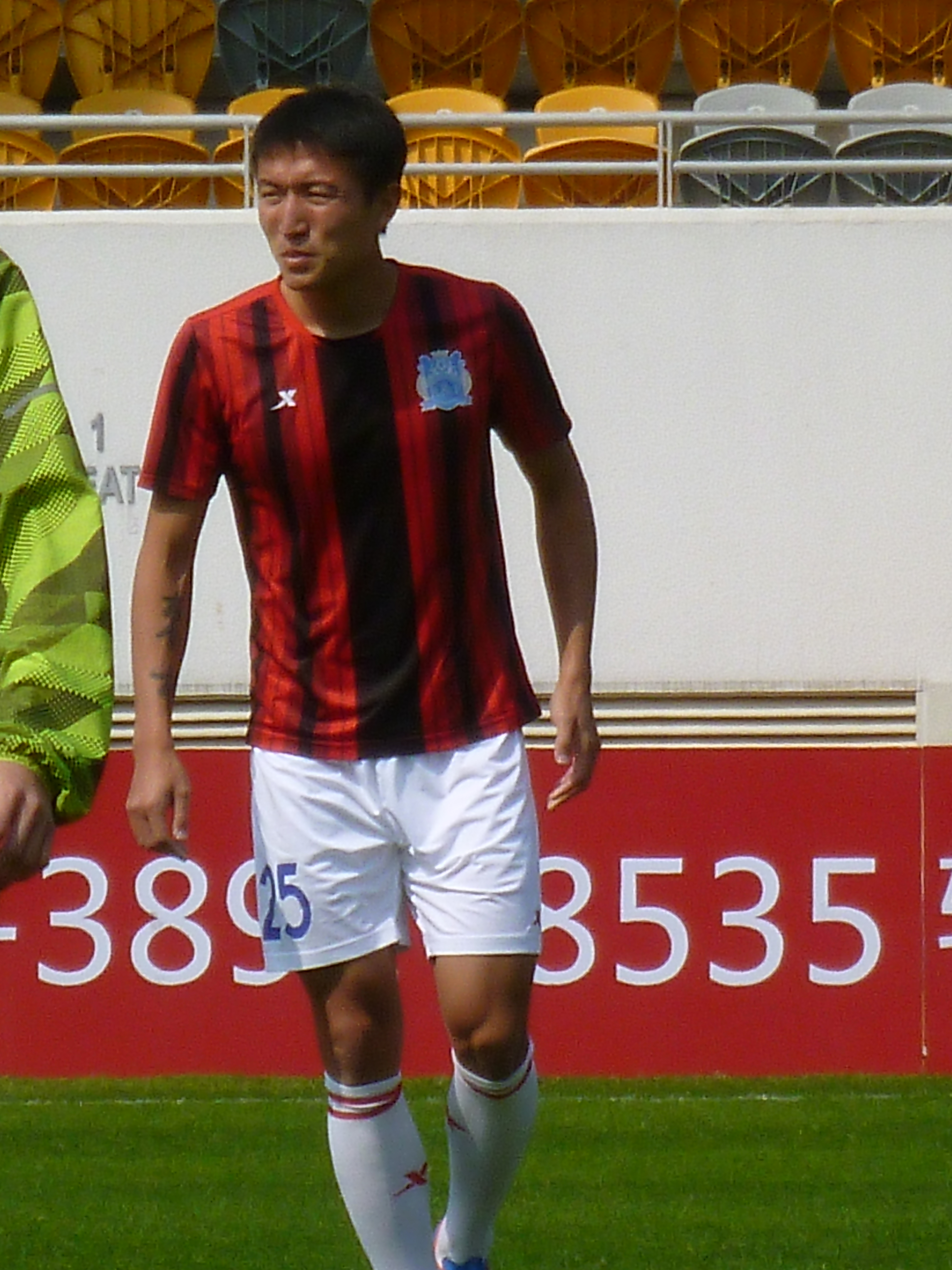

Personal information
- Date of birth: 25 November 1987 (age 38)
- Place of birth: Hong Kong
- Height: 1.81 m (5 ft 11 1/2 in)
- Position: Midfielder

Team information
- Current team: Central & Western
- Number: 25

Senior career*
Years	Team	Apps	(Gls)
2006–2007	Sun Hei	0	(0)
2012–2014	Sun Hei	10	(0)
2014	Sun Source	1	(0)
2014	Double Flower	22	(1)
2015–2016	Eastern District	16	(2)
2016–2017	R&F	10	(0)
2017–2018	Dreams	17	(0)
2018–2024	Central & Western	110	(4)
2024–2025	Kui Tan		
2025–	Central & Western	23	(0)
- * Club domestic league appearances and goals as of 16 May 2026

Lam Wan Kit (Chinese: 林雲傑; born 25 November 1987 in Hong Kong) is a Hong Kong former professional footballer.

== Career ==
Lam signed his first professional contract at age 19 with Sun Hei in 2006. Due to his need to balance his part-time work and football life, he did train enough to show improvement as a player and was not retained the following season.

In 2012, Lam returned to Sun Hei, making 10 appearances for the club. However, at the conclusion of the 2013-14 season, Sun Hei declined to join the new fully professional Hong Kong Premier League leaving Lam without a contract for the following season.

After a brief stint with Sun Source at the start of the 2014-15 season, Lam spent the remainder of the campaign with Double Flower where he made 22 league appearances for the club.

The following season, Lam signed with Eastern District where he helped the club to reach promotion after a runners-up finish in the 2015-16 Second Division table.

In a bid to return to the top flight, Lam went on trial with several new HKPL clubs during the summer of 2016. He eventually signed with R&F and made his debut on 18 September in a Senior Shield match against Biu Chun Glory Sky.

Ahead of the 2017-18 season, Lam moved to fellow HKPL club Dreams. He made his debut on 31 December 2017 in a 2017–18 Hong Kong FA Cup first round loss to Lee Man.
