= Xing Yu (footballer) =

Chinese footballer

Xing Yu 邢瑜
Personal information
- Full name: Xing Yu
- Date of birth: 8 January 1996 (age 30)
- Place of birth: Chongqing, Sichuan, China
- Height: 1.94 m (6 ft 4 in)
- Position: Goalkeeper

Youth career
- Chengdu Blades
- 2015–2017: Guangzhou R&F

Senior career*
Years	Team	Apps	(Gls)
2014	Chengdu Blades	0	(0)
2016–2017	R&F (Hong Kong)	10	(0)
2018–2020	Qingdao Huanghai	15	(0)
2021–2023	Chengdu Rongcheng	0	(0)
2023	→ Nanjing City (loan)	0	(0)
- * Club domestic league appearances and goals as of 8 January 2023

Xing Yu (Chinese: 邢瑜; pinyin: Xíng Yú; Mandarin pronunciation: [ɕǐŋ.y̌]; born 8 January 1996) is a Chinese footballer.

== Club career ==
Xing Yu started his professional football career in July 2014 when he was promoted to China League One side Chengdu Blades's first team squad. He moved to Chinese Super League side Guangzhou R&F in 2015 after Chengdu's dissolution. In August 2016, he was loaned to Hong Kong Premier League side R&F, which was the satellite team of Guangzhou R&F. He made his senior debut on 24 September 2016 in a 2–0 away defeat against BC Glory Sky. He shared the starting position with Long Wenhao, playing 12 matches for R&F in the 2016–17 season.

Xing Yu would return to the Chinese leagues where he joined second tier club Qingdao Huanghai and spent the 2018 league season in the team's reserves, however the following campaign he was included in the first team where he would make his debut for the club in a league game on 29 June 2019 in a 1-1 draw against Nantong Zhiyun. Throughout the season he would fight for the first-choice goalkeeping spot against Zhao Shi, eventually being the first-choice goalkeeper that lead the team to win the 2019 China League One and promotion to the top tier. The following season the club would bring in Liu Zhenli as the first-choice goalkeeper and Xing would join second tier football club Chengdu Rongcheng as their reserve choice goalkeeper as the club gained promotion to the top tier at the end of the 2021 league campaign.

== Career statistics ==
As of 8 January 2023.

Appearances and goals by club, season and competition
Club	Season	League			National Cup		League Cup		Continental		Other		Total	
Club	Season	Division	Apps	Goals	Apps	Goals	Apps	Goals	Apps	Goals	Apps	Goals	Apps	Goals
Chengdu Blades	2014	China League One	0	0	0	0	-		-		-		0	0
R&F	2016–17	Hong Kong Premier League	10	0	1	0	0 (Note: Appearances in Hong Kong Senior Challenge Shield)	0	-		1 (Note: Appearances in Hong Kong Sapling Cup)	0	12	0
Qingdao Huanghai	2019	China League One	15	0	0	0	-		-		-		15	0
Qingdao Huanghai	2020	Chinese Super League	0	0	0	0	-		-		-		0	0
Qingdao Huanghai	Total		15	0	0	0	0	0	0	0	0	0	15	0
Chengdu Rongcheng	2021	China League One	0	0	0	0	-		-		0 (Note: Appearance(s) in CSL Relegation play-offs)	0	0	0
Chengdu Rongcheng	2022	Chinese Super League	0	0	2	0	-		-		-		2	0
Chengdu Rongcheng	Total		0	0	2	0	0	0	0	0	0	0	2	0
Career total			25	0	3	0	0	0	0	0	1	0	29	0

== Honours ==
=== Club ===
Qingdao Huanghai

- China League One: 2019
