= Huang Haoxuan =

Chinese footballer

Huang Haoxuan 黄浩轩
Personal information
- Full name: Huang Haoxuan
- Date of birth: 15 January 1994 (age 32)
- Place of birth: Beihai, Guangxi, China
- Height: 1.78 m (5 ft 10 in)
- Position: Midfielder

Team information
- Current team: Guangxi Pingguo Haliao
- Number: 22

Youth career
- Guangdong Youth
- 2015–: Guangzhou R&F

Senior career*
Years	Team	Apps	(Gls)
2011–2012	Guangdong Youth	35	(3)
2014	Guangdong Sunray Cave	5	(0)
2017	R&F	8	(0)
2017–2020	Lhasa UCI	26	(1)
2020–	Guangxi Pingguo Haliao	3	(0)
- * Club domestic league appearances and goals as of 31 December 2020

Huang Haoxuan (simplified Chinese: 黄浩轩; traditional Chinese: 黃浩軒; pinyin: Huáng Hàoxuān; born 15 January 1994) is a Chinese footballer who plays for China League Two side Guangxi Pingguo Haliao.

== Club career ==
Huang Haoxuan started his professional football career in 2011 when he was promoted to Guangdong Youth's squad for the 2011 China League Two campaign. He joined China League One side Guangdong Sunray Cave in December 2013. On 15 March 2014, he made his debut for the club in a 2–2 home draw against Hebei Zhongji. He became an unattached player after Guangdong failed to register for the 2015 league season due to wage arrears.

Huang joined Guangzhou R&F's reserve team in July 2015. He was loaned to Hong Kong Premier League side R&F, which was the satellite team of Guangzhou R&F, in February 2017. He made his debut on 18 February 2017 in a 4–3 away win against Hong Kong FC.

== Career statistics ==
As of 31 December 2020

Appearances and goals by club, season and competition
Club	Season	League			National Cup		League Cup		Continental		Total	
Club	Season	Division	Apps	Goals	Apps	Goals	Apps	Goals	Apps	Goals	Apps	Goals
Guangdong Youth	2011	China League Two	15	1	-		-		-		15	1
Guangdong Youth	2012	China League Two	20	2	2	0	-		-		22	2
Guangdong Youth	Total		35	3	2	0	0	0	0	0	37	3
Guangdong Sunray Cave	2014	China League One	5	0	0	0	-		-		5	0
R&F	2016–17	Hong Kong Premier League	8	0	0	0	0 (Note: Appearances in Hong Kong Senior Challenge Shield)	0	-		8	0
Lhasa UCI	2017	Amateur League	-		-		-		-		-	-
Lhasa UCI	2018	Champions League	-		-		-		-		-	-
Lhasa UCI	2019	China League Two	26	1	2	0	-		-		28	1
Lhasa UCI	Total		26	1	2	0	0	0	0	0	28	1
Guangxi Pingguo Haliao	2020	China League Two	3	0	-		-		-		3	0
Career total			77	4	4	0	0	0	0	0	81	4
