= Xiang Jiachi =

Chinese footballer

Xiang Jiachi 向嘉驰
Personal information
- Full name: Xiang Jiachi
- Date of birth: 10 January 1993 (age 33)
- Place of birth: Wuhan, Hubei, China
- Height: 1.84 m (6 ft 1/2 in)
- Position: Midfielder

Youth career
- Dongguan Nancheng
- 2013–2015: Guangzhou R&F

Senior career*
Years	Team	Apps	(Gls)
2011–2012	Dongguan Nancheng	19	(1)
2016–2017	Guangzhou R&F	0	(0)
2016–2017	→ R&F (loan)	16	(2)
2017	→ Lhasa Urban Construction Investment (loan)		
2018–2021	Xinjiang Tianshan Leopard	34	(0)
- * Club domestic league appearances and goals as of 31 December 2020

Xiang Jiachi (simplified Chinese: 向嘉驰; traditional Chinese: 向嘉馳; pinyin: Xiàng Jiāchí; born 10 January 1993) is a Chinese footballer.

== Club career ==
Xiang Jiachi started his professional football career in 2011 when he was promoted to Dongguan Nancheng's squad for the 2011 China League Two campaign. He scored his first senior goal on 9 July 2011, in a 1–0 victory against Hubei CTGU Kangtian. Xiang transferred to Chinese Super League side Guangzhou R&F in 2013. After playing in the reserve league for three years, he was promoted to Guangzhou R&F's first team squad by Dragan Stojković in 2016. In August 2016, he was loaned to Hong Kong Premier League side R&F, which was the satellite team of Guangzhou R&F. On 24 September 2016, he made his debut for R&F in a 2–0 away defeat against BC Glory Sky, coming on as a substitute for Wei Zongren in the 61st minute. He scored his first goal for the club on 30 September 2016, in a 2–1 away win against Hong Kong Pegasus.

== Career statistics ==
As of 31 December 2020.

Appearances and goals by club, season and competition
Club	Season	League			National Cup		League Cup		Continental		Other		Total	
Club	Season	Division	Apps	Goals	Apps	Goals	Apps	Goals	Apps	Goals	Apps	Goals	Apps	Goals
Dongguan Nancheng	2011	China League Two	9	1	-		-		-		-		9	1
Dongguan Nancheng	2012	China League Two	10	0	2	0	-		-		-		12	0
Dongguan Nancheng	Total		19	1	2	0	0	0	0	0	0	0	21	1
Guangzhou R&F	2016	Chinese Super League	0	0	0	0	-		-		-		0	0
R&F (loan)	2016–17	Hong Kong Premier League	16	2	1	0	0 (Note: Appearances in Hong Kong Senior Challenge Shield)	0	-		1 (Note: Appearances in Hong Kong Sapling Cup)	0	18	2
Lhasa Urban Construction Investment (loan)	2017	CAL	-		-		-		-		-		-	-
Xinjiang Tianshan Leopard	2018	China League One	5	0	0	0	-		-		-		5	0
Xinjiang Tianshan Leopard	2019	China League One	23	0	0	0	-		-		-		23	0
Xinjiang Tianshan Leopard	2020	China League One	6	0	-		-		-		2 (Note: Appearances in China League One Relegation play-offs)	0	8	0
Xinjiang Tianshan Leopard	Total		34	0	0	0	0	0	0	0	2	0	36	0
Career Total			69	3	3	0	0	0	0	0	3	0	75	3
