= Ning An (footballer) =

Chinese footballer

Ning An 宁安
Personal information
- Date of birth: 8 October 1995 (age 31)
- Place of birth: Guangzhou, Guangdong, China
- Height: 1.73 m (5 ft 8 in)
- Position: Midfielder

Team information
- Current team: Guangdong Wuchuan Youth

Youth career
- Guangzhou R&F

Senior career*
| Years | Team | Apps | (Gls) |
| 2016–2023 | Guangzhou City | 11 | (0) |
| 2017 | → R&F (loan) | 7 | (0) |
| 2018–2019 | → R&F (loan) | 4 | (0) |
| 2020 | → Guangxi Pingguo Haliao (loan) | 9 | (0) |
| 2021 | → Sichuan Minzu (loan) | 8 | (1) |
| 2023–2024 | Foshan Nanshi | 1 | (0) |
| 2024–2025 | Guangdong GZ-Power | 4 | (0) |
| 2025–2026 | Guangxi Pingguo | 4 | (0) |
| 2026– | Guangdong Wuchuan Youth | 0 | (0) |
- * Club domestic league appearances and goals as of 31 December 2022

Ning An (Chinese: 宁安; pinyin: Nìng Ān or Níng Ān; Mandarin pronunciation: [nîŋ án] or [nǐŋ án]; born 8 October 1995 in Guangzhou) is a Chinese football player who currently plays for Guangdong Wuchuan Youth.

== Club career ==
Ning An was promoted to Chinese Super League side Guangzhou R&F's (now known as Guangzhou City) first team squad by manager Dragan Stojković in 2016. He made his senior debut on 12 March 2016 in a 1–0 away victory against Tianjin Teda, coming on as a substitute for Chang Feiya in the 87th minute. Ning was loaned to Hong Kong Premier League side R&F, which was the satellite team of Guangzhou R&F, in February 2017. He made his debut on 18 February 2017 in a 4–3 away win against Hong Kong FC, coming on as a substitute for Chen Liming in the 69th minute.

== Career statistics ==
Statistics accurate as of match played 31 December 2022.

Appearances and goals by club, season and competition
| Club | Season | League | | | National Cup | | League Cup | | Continental | | Other | | Total | |
| Club | Season | Division | Apps | Goals | Apps | Goals | Apps | Goals | Apps | Goals | Apps | Goals | Apps | Goals |
|---|---|---|---|---|---|---|---|---|---|---|---|---|---|---|
| Guangzhou R&F/ Guangzhou City | 2016 | Chinese Super League | 5 | 0 | 1 | 0 | - | | - | | - | | 6 | 0 |
| Guangzhou R&F/ Guangzhou City | 2017 | Chinese Super League | 0 | 0 | 0 | 0 | - | | - | | - | | 0 | 0 |
| Guangzhou R&F/ Guangzhou City | 2022 | Chinese Super League | 6 | 0 | 0 | 0 | - | | - | | - | | 6 | 0 |
| Guangzhou R&F/ Guangzhou City | Total | | 11 | 0 | 1 | 0 | 0 | 0 | 0 | 0 | 0 | 0 | 12 | 0 |
| R&F (loan) | 2016–17 | Hong Kong Premier League | 7 | 0 | 0 | 0 | 0 (Note: Appearances in Hong Kong Senior Challenge Shield) | 0 | - | | 0 (Note: Appearances in Sapling Cup) | 0 | 7 | 0 |
| R&F (loan) | 2018–19 | Hong Kong Premier League | 4 | 0 | 0 | 0 | 1 | 0 | - | | 2 | 0 | 7 | 0 |
| Guangxi Pingguo Haliao (loan) | 2020 | China League Two | 9 | 0 | - | | - | | - | | - | | 9 | 0 |
| Sichuan Minzu (loan) | 2021 | China League Two | 8 | 1 | 1 | 0 | - | | - | | - | | 9 | 1 |
| Career total | | | 39 | 1 | 2 | 0 | 1 | 0 | 0 | 0 | 2 | 0 | 44 | 1 |
