= Chen Liming =

Chinese-born Hong Kong footballer

Chen Liming 陳立明
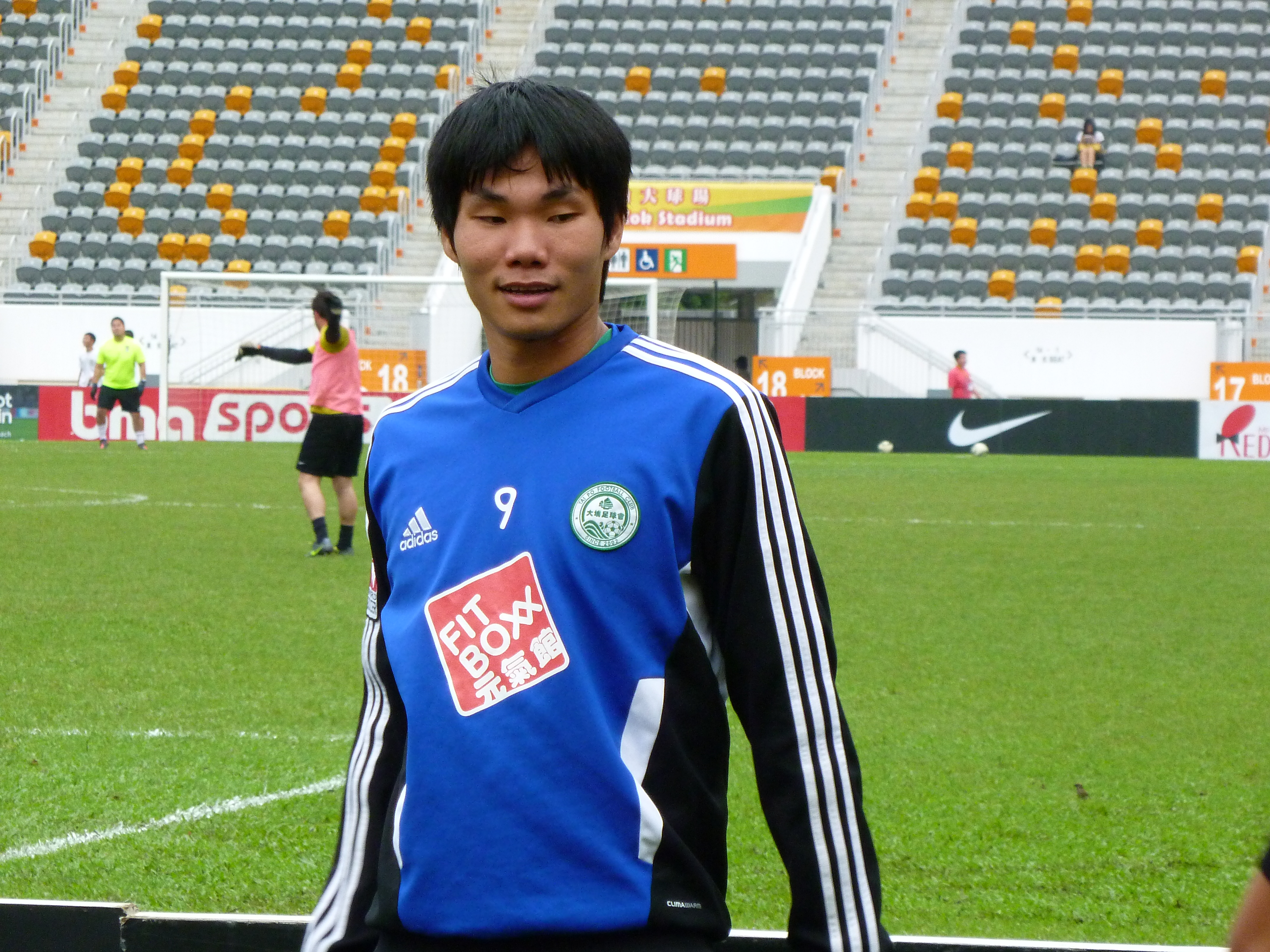

Personal information
- Full name: Chen Liming
- Date of birth: 20 April 1987 (age 39)
- Place of birth: Guangzhou, China
- Height: 1.85 m (6 ft 1 in)
- Position: Forward

Youth career
- Guangzhou FC

Senior career*
Years	Team	Apps	(Gls)
2004–2007	Guangzhou GPC	0	(0)
2004–2005	→ Xiangxue Pharmaceutical (loan)	3	(0)
2009–2016	Tai Po	105	(28)
2017	R&F	10	(2)
2017–2018	Wong Tai Sin	20	(11)
2018–2019	Happy Valley	25	(11)
- * Club domestic league appearances and goals as of 2 December 2019

Chen Liming (Chinese: 陳立明; born 20 April 1987) is a Chinese former professional footballer who played as a forward.
