= Zhi-Gin Lam =

German footballer

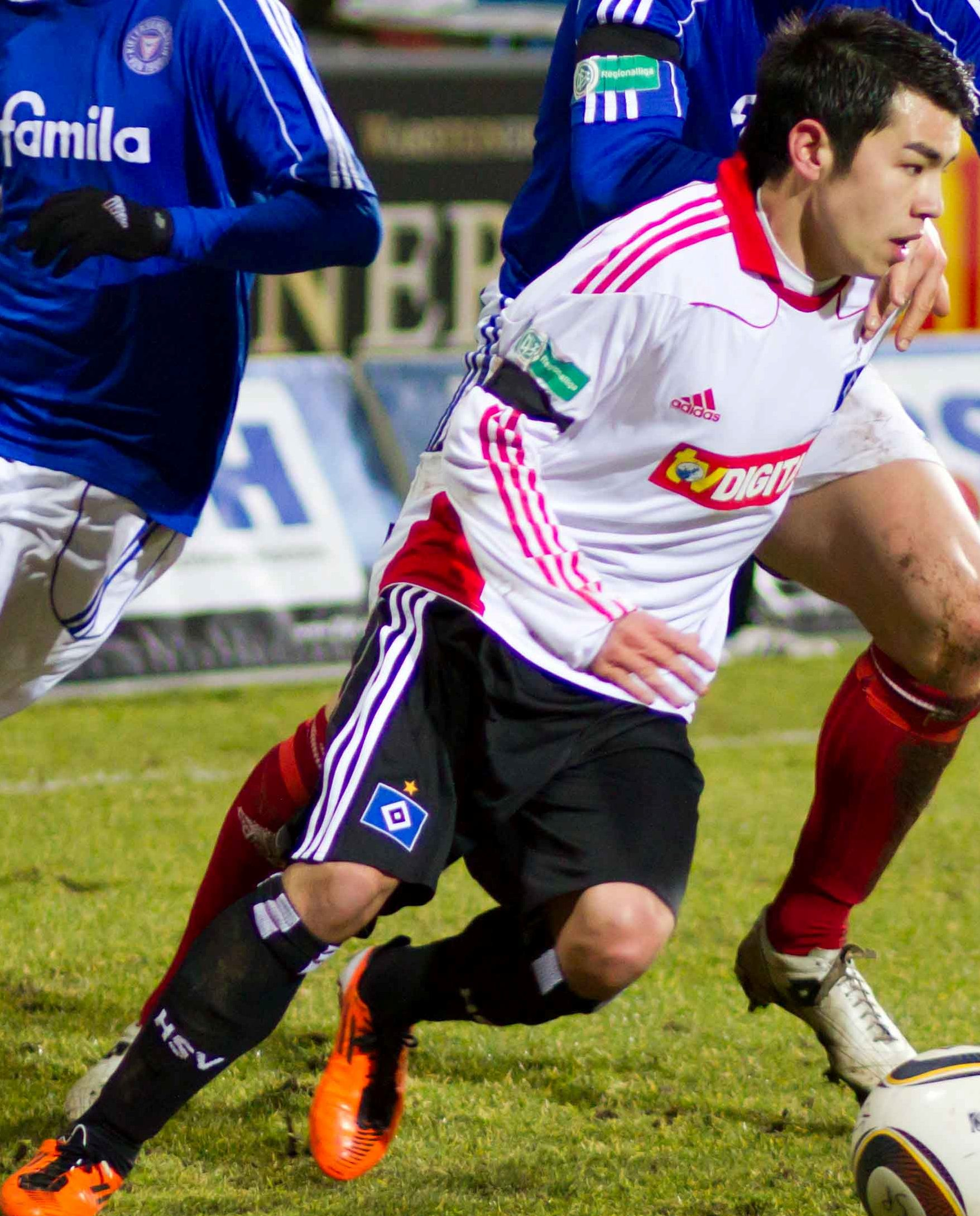
- Lam playing for Hamburger SV II in 2011

Personal information
- Full name: German: Zhi-Gin Andreas Lam; Chinese: 林志堅
- Date of birth: 4 June 1991 (age 35)
- Place of birth: Hamburg, Germany
- Height: 1.75 m (5 ft 9 in)
- Positions: Full-back; midfielder

Team information
- Current team: TuS Dassendorf
- Number: 19

Youth career
- 1999–2003: VfL Lohbrügge
- 2003–2005: SV Nettelnburg-Allermöhe
- 2005–2010: Hamburger SV

Senior career*
Years	Team	Apps	(Gls)
2010–2013	Hamburger SV II	67	(4)
2011–2014	Hamburger SV	20	(1)
2014–2016	Greuther Fürth II	10	(2)
2014–2016	Greuther Fürth	14	(0)
2016–2018	Kitchee	29	(2)
2018–2020	R&F	29	(7)
2021–	TuS Dassendorf	78	(7)
- * Club domestic league appearances and goals as of 07:46, 12 Aug 2025 (UTC)

Zhi-Gin Andreas Lam (Chinese: 林志堅, pronounced [tɕiː˧ kiːn˥˧ lɐm˨˩]; born 4 June 1991) is a German professional footballer who plays as a full-back or midfielder for Oberliga Hamburg club TuS Dassendorf.

== Early life ==
Lam was born in Hamburg, Germany to a Chinese father from Hong Kong and a German mother. His father emigrated to Hamburg in the 1980s. Lam has three elder sisters. When he was young, he often went back to Hong Kong with his family for summer holidays and played football in Sheung Shui.

== Club career ==
=== Hamburger SV ===
Lam began his career with the youth club for Hamburger SV in 2005 and in 2010 became an active player in the reserve team, Hamburger SV II, where he developed under manager Rodolfo Cardoso. In the 2011–12 season, after the dismissal of first-team coach Michael Oenning on 19 September 2011, Rodolfo was appointed the interim coach of the first team and started Lam (in Rodolfo's first game at the helm of HSV) against VfB Stuttgart on 23 September 2011. Cardoso's decision to start Lam proved to be a good one, as Lam was widely praised in his debut, with HSV sporting director Frank Arnesen saying, "He has done fantastically, [he] was totally relaxed. That was a real dream debut."

On 15 September 2013, he scored his first professional goal in the away league match against Borussia Dortmund. However, his goal could not save his team from losing 6–2.

=== Greuther Fürth ===
On 5 June 2014, he signed a three-year contract with 2. Bundesliga side Greuther Fürth until 2017. The transfer fee is believed be about €200,000.

=== Kitchee ===
On 2 July 2016, Hong Kong Premier League club Kitchee announced that Lam would join the club. At the conclusion of the 2017–18 season, he declined to sign a new contract in order to pursue opportunities in Germany.

=== R&F ===
On 9 August 2018, Lam signed with another Hong Kong team R&F, a feeder team of Guangzhou R&F. He scored seven goals in 29 league matches during his spell at the club. On 14 October 2020, Lam left the club after his club's withdrawal from the HKPL in the new season.

=== TuS Dassendorf ===
In January 2021, Oberliga Hamburg club TuS Dassendorf announced that Lam would join the club. He signed a contract until 2024.

== Style of play ==
Hamburger SV coach Rodolfo Cardoso described Lam as a courageous player, unafraid to claim the ball and "a very intelligent player...[who] can play anywhere."

== Career statistics ==
As of 11 October 2020

Appearances and goals by club, season and competition
Club	Season	League			Cups		Total	
Club	Season	Division	Apps	Goals	Apps	Goals	Apps	Goals
Hamburger SV II	2009–10	Regionalliga Nord	2	0	0	0	2	0
Hamburger SV II	2010–11	Regionalliga Nord	31	3	0	0	31	3
Hamburger SV II	2011–12	Regionalliga Nord	19	1	0	0	19	1
Hamburger SV II	2012–13	Regionalliga Nord	13	0	0	0	13	0
Hamburger SV II	2013–14	Regionalliga Nord	2	0	0	0	2	0
Hamburger SV II	Total		67	4	0	0	67	4
Hamburg SV	2011–12	Bundesliga	7	0	1	0	8	0
Hamburg SV	2012–13	Bundesliga	4	0	1	0	5	0
Hamburg SV	2013–14	Bundesliga	9	1	2	0	11	1
Hamburg SV	Total		20	1	4	0	24	1
Greuther Fürth II	2014–15	Regionalliga Bayern	4	0	0	0	4	0
Greuther Fürth II	2015–16	Regionalliga Bayern	6	2	0	0	6	2
Greuther Fürth II	Total		10	2	0	0	10	2
Greuther Fürth	2014–15	2. Bundesliga	13	0	1	0	14	0
Greuther Fürth	2015–16	2. Bundesliga	1	0	0	0	1	0
Greuther Fürth	Total		14	0	1	0	15	0
Kitchee	2016–17	Hong Kong Premier League	16	1	6	2	22	3
Kitchee	2017–18	Hong Kong Premier League	13	1	7	0	20	1
Kitchee	Total		29	2	13	2	42	4
R&F	2018–19	Hong Kong Premier League	16	5	3	0	19	5
R&F	2019–20	Hong Kong Premier League	13	2	6	0	19	2
R&F	Total		29	7	9	0	38	7
Career total			169	16	27	2	196	18

== Honours ==
Kitchee

- Hong Kong Premier League: 2016–17, 2017–18
- Hong Kong Senior Shield: 2016–17
- Hong Kong FA Cup: 2016–17, 2017–18
- Hong Kong Sapling Cup: 2017–18
