= Gergely Ghéczy =

Hungarian footballer

Gergley Ghéczy
Personal information
- Full name: Gergely Zoltan Ghéczy
- Date of birth: 3 November 1980 (age 45)
- Place of birth: Budapest, Hungary
- Height: 1.86 m (6 ft 1 in)
- Position: Centre-back

Senior career*
Years	Team	Apps	(Gls)
–2001	FC Tatabánya	4	(0)
2006	Home United	2	(0)
2006–2007	Dunaújváros FC	8	(0)
2006–2007	1. FC Pforzheim	8	(1)
2007–2008	Stal Stalowa Wola	13	(0)
2008–2009	Vác FC	6	(1)
2009–2010	Shatin	1	(0)
2010–2017	HKFC	112	(21)
2017–2018	Rangers (HKG)	3	(0)
2019–2020	Taksony SE	7	(0)
- * Club domestic league appearances and goals

Gergely Ghéczy (Chinese: 芝利·卡士; born 3 November 1980) is a Hungarian former professional footballer who played as a centre-back.
