= Tsang Chi Hau =

Hong Kong footballer (born 1990)

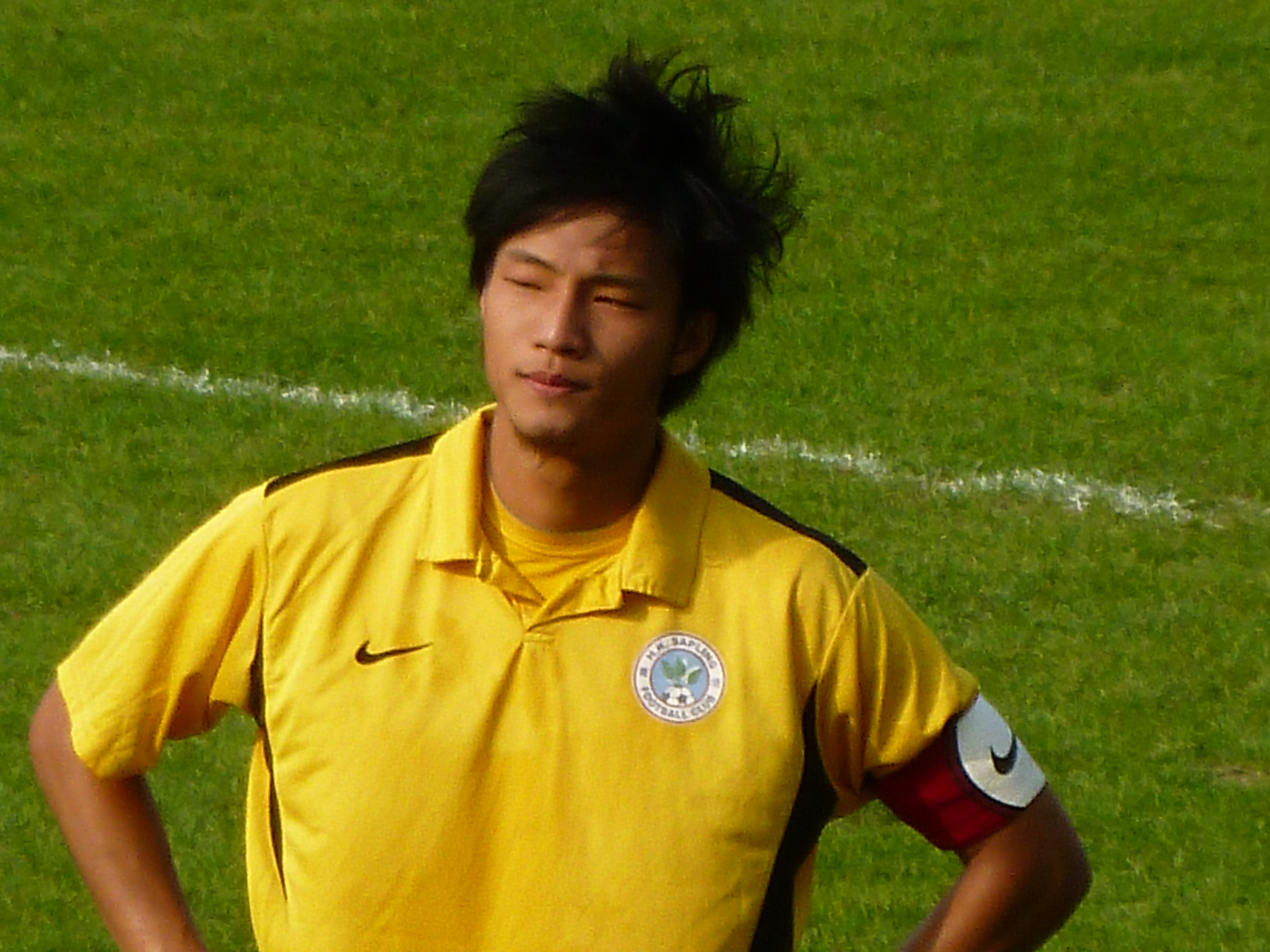

Personal information
- Full name: Tsang Chi Hau
- Date of birth: 12 January 1990 (age 36)
- Place of birth: Tsz Wan Shan, Hong Kong
- Height: 1.84 m (6 ft 0 in)
- Positions: Centre back; defensive midfielder

Youth career
- 2005–2007: Hong Kong 09

Senior career*
Years	Team	Apps	(Gls)
2007–2008	Workable	0	(0)
2008–2009	Eastern	5	(0)
2009–2010	Happy Valley	13	(1)
2010–2015	Kitchee	4	(0)
2010–2011	→ Tai Chung (loan)	14	(1)
2011–2012	→ HK Sapling (loan)	13	(0)
2015–2019	Eastern	20	(0)
2019	→ Pegasus (loan)	6	(0)
2019–2020	Yuen Long	9	(0)
2020–2021	Happy Valley	5	(0)
2021–2024	Tsuen Wan		
2024	Wing Yee	11	(0)
2024–2025	Ravia		
2025	Bright Cerulean	1	(0)

International career
2010	Hong Kong	3	(0)
- * Club domestic league appearances and goals

Tsang Chi Hau (Chinese: 曾至孝; Jyutping: zang^{1} zi^{3} haau^{3} ; born 12 January 1990 in Hong Kong) is a Hong Kong former professional footballer.

His younger brother, Tsang Kin Fong, is also a former professional footballer.

== Club career ==
=== Hong Kong 09 ===
Tsang Chi Hau joined Hong Kong 09 in 2005, but then the team is dissolved because of the formation of Hong Kong C Team in 2007.

=== Workable ===
In 2007, Tsang Chi Hau joined the newly promoted team Workable after leaving Hong Kong 09. He was selected into match squad for 4 league games, although he did not feature any matches. Workable was relegated after competing in Hong Kong First Division League for one season. The team was dissolved after the relegation on 8 May 2008.

=== Eastern ===
Tsang Chi Hau followed Workable manager Chan Hiu Ming's and coach Lee Kin Wo's footstep and joined Eastern. He made his Hong Kong First Division League debut against Sun Hei as an 82nd-minute substitute for Rodrigo Andreis Galvão. He made 5 league appearances, which were all as substitute, and one league cup match.

Although Eastern avoided relegation as they were placed at 9th out of 13 teams, the team decided not to compete in Hong Kong First Division League and chose to compete in Hong Kong Third Division League in the next season. Therefore, Tsang Chi Hau chose to leave the club.

=== Happy Valley ===
Tsang Chi Hau joined Happy Valley after spending a season in Eastern. He made his debut for Happy Valley against Kitchee on 11 September 2009. He scored his first Hong Kong First Division League goal against Tai Chung on 16 January 2010. He played 13 league matches for Happy Valley in total. However, Happy Valley were relegated after placed at the bottom of the table. Thus, Tsang decided to leave the team.

=== Kitchee ===
Tsang Chi Hau decided to join Kitchee, playing with his younger brother again since they were playing at their father's club. However, Tsang was loaned to Tai Chung right after he joined the club.

=== On loan to Tai Chung ===
Tsang Chi Hau was loaned to Tai Chung after he joined Kitchee. He made 14 league appearances and scored 1 goal. He also featured one matches in Hong Kong Senior Challenge Shield, Hong Kong FA Cup and Hong Kong League Cup respectively.

=== On loan to Hong Kong Sapling ===
In the summer of 2011, Tsang, with his younger brother, were loaned to Hong Kong Sapling. His performance was impressive and thus became the captain of the team.

=== Return to Kitchee ===
After a successful loan spell in Sapling, Tsang Chi Hau returned Kitchee and became a first team player of Kitchee.

=== On loan to Pegasus ===
On 8 January 2019, Tsang was sent on loan to Pegasus. He had struggled with injuries during the first half of the season and was sent on loan by Eastern in order to regain his match fitness.

=== On loan to Yuen Long ===
On 9 August 2019, it was revealed that Tsang has joined Yuen Long.

=== Happy Valley ===
On 1 June 2020, Happy Valley confirmed that Tsang would return to the club for the second half of the season. Not long after signing with the club, Tsang tore his anterior cruciate ligament, requiring two operations. He resumed training on 4 January 2021.

== Personal life ==
In 2019, Tsang obtained his AFC C coaching license.

== Career statistics ==
=== Club ===
As of 7 October 2012

Club	Season	League		Senior Shield		League Cup		FA Cup		AFC Cup		Total	
Club	Season	Apps	Goals	Apps	Goals	Apps	Goals	Apps	Goals	Apps	Goals	Apps	Goals
Workable	2007–08	0	0	0	0	0	0	0	0	N/A	N/A	0	0
Eastern Total		0	0	0	0	0	0	0	0	0	0	0	0
Eastern	2008–09	5	0	0	0	1	0	0	0	2	0	8	0
Eastern Total		5	0	0	0	1	0	0	0	2	0	8	0
Happy Valley	2009–10	13	1	0	0	—	—	0	0	N/A	N/A	13	1
Happy Valley Total		13	1	0	0	0	0	0	0	0	0	13	1
Tai Chung (loan)	2010–11	14	1	1	0	1	0	1	0	N/A	N/A	17	1
Tai Chung Total		14	1	1	0	1	0	1	0	0	0	17	1
Hong Kong Sapling (loan)	2011–12	13	0	2	0	0	0	1	0	N/A	N/A	16	0
Hong Kong Sapling Total		13	0	2	0	0	0	1	0	0	0	16	0
Kitchee	2012–13	4	0	0	0	0	0	1	0	3	0	8	0
Kitchee Total		4	0	0	0	0	0	1	0	3	0	8	0
Total		49	2	3	0	2	0	3	0	5	0	62	2

== Honours ==
=== Club ===
Eastern

- Hong Kong Premier League: 2015–16
- Hong Kong Senior Shield: 2015–16

Kitchee

- Hong Kong Premier League: 2014–15
- Hong Kong First Division: 2013–14
- Hong Kong FA Cup: 2012–13, 2014–15
- Hong Kong League Cup: 2014–15
