= Tsang Kin Fong =

Hong Kong footballer

Tsang Kin Fong 曾健晃
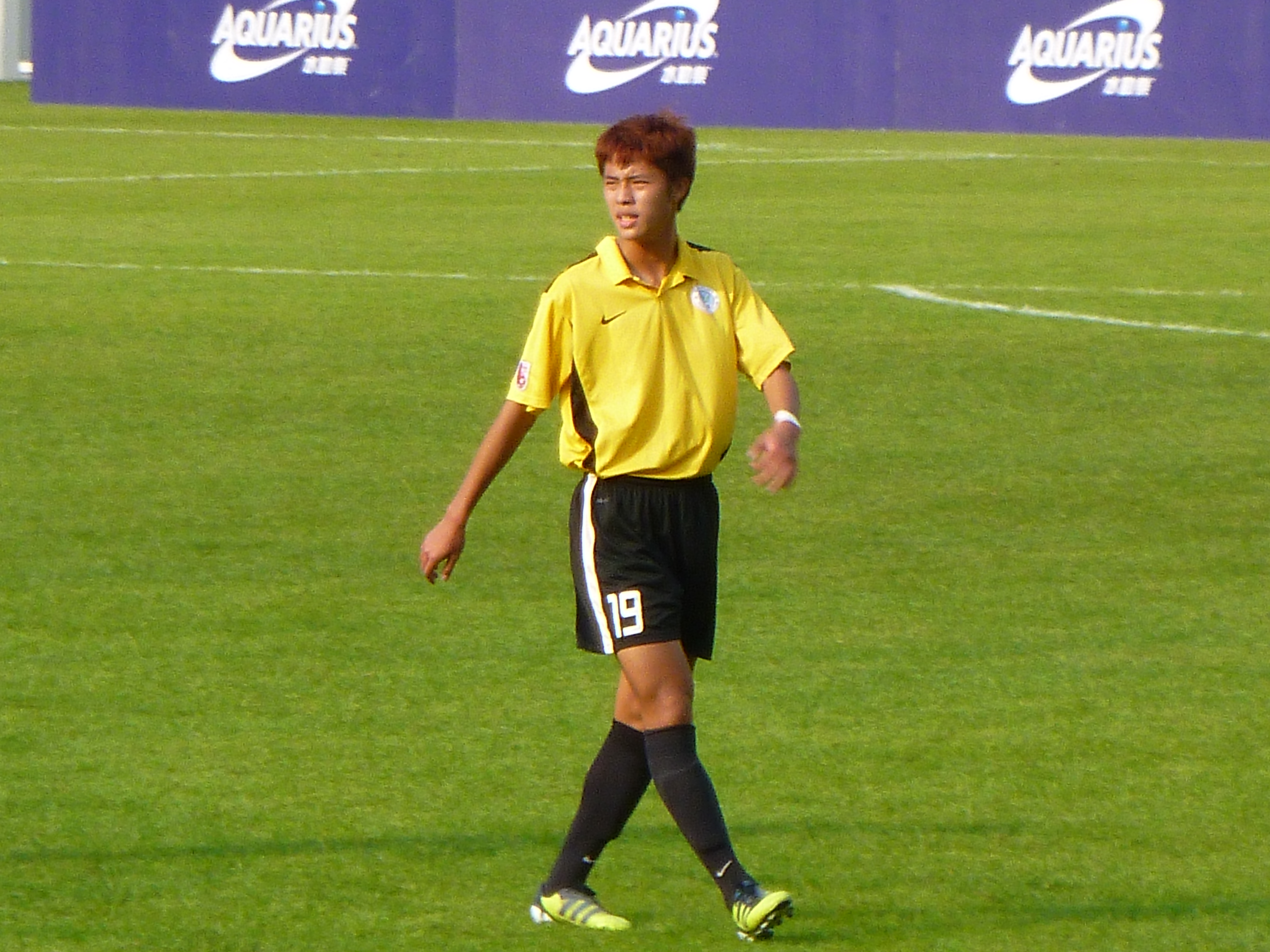

Personal information
- Full name: Tsang Kin Fong
- Date of birth: 2 January 1993 (age 33)
- Place of birth: Tsz Wan Shan, Hong Kong
- Height: 1.86 m (6 ft 1 in)
- Positions: Winger; centre back

Youth career
- 2005–2008: Kitchee

Senior career*
Years	Team	Apps	(Gls)
2008–2010	Shatin	1	(0)
2010–2013	Kitchee	2	(0)
2011–2012	→ Hong Kong Sapling (loan)	15	(1)
2012–2013	→ Sun Hei (loan)	4	(0)
2014–2016	Yau Tsim Mong	15	(13)
2016–2018	R&F	31	(0)
2018–2019	Råslätts	5	(0)
2019–2020	Pegasus	0	(0)
2020–2022	Shatin	16	(0)
2022–2025	Central & Western	61	(3)
2025–	Kui Tan	22	(5)

International career
2011	Hong Kong U23	1	(0)
- * Club domestic league appearances and goals as of 31 May 2026

Tsang Kin Fong (Chinese: 曾健晃; Jyutping: zang^{1} gin^{6} fong^{2}; born 2 January 1993) is a Hong Kong former professional footballer who played as a winger or a centre back.

His elder brother, Tsang Chi Hau, is also a former professional footballer.

== Club career ==
Tsang was one of Kitchee's youth team players who won the champions of the U-15 group. He had his secondary school life at Lam Tai Fai College. He represented the college in the HKSSF football section. He also transferred to Shatin, which was led by Lam Tai Fai, helping Shatin to win the 2008–09 Hong Kong Second Division League. He finally got his first chance to play in the Hong Kong First Division. He played his first Hong Kong First Division League match during match against South China.

Shatin placed ninth out of ten teams and was relegated to the Hong Kong Second Division League. As a result, Tsang joined Kitchee, playing with his elder brother again at their father's club. In the summer of 2011, Tsang, with his elder brother, were loaned to Hong Kong Sapling.

On 8 July 2019, Tsang returned to Hong Kong, signing a contract with Pegasus.

== Career statistics ==
=== Club ===
As of 12 September 2011

Club	Season	League		Junior Shield		League Cup		FA Cup		AFC Cup		Total	
Club	Season	Apps	Goals	Apps	Goals	Apps	Goals	Apps	Goals	Apps	Goals	Apps	Goals
Shatin	2008–09	8(4)	2	4 (2)	0	N/A	N/A	0 (0)	0	N/A	N/A	12	6
Club	Season	League		Senior Shield		League Cup		FA Cup		AFC Cup		Total	
Club	Season	Apps	Goals	Apps	Goals	Apps	Goals	Apps	Goals	Apps	Goals	Apps	Goals
Shatin	2009–10	10 (2)	0	0 (0)	0	0 (0)	0	2(1)	0	N/A	N/A	12	3
Kitchee	2010–11	0 (0)	0	0 (0)	0	0 (0)	0	0 (0)	0	N/A	N/A	0 (0)	0
Sapling	2011–12	16 (2)	0	2 (0)	0	1 (0)	0	2 (1)	0	N/A	N/A	21	3
Sunray Cave JC Sun Hei	2012–13	17 (0)	0	0 (0)	0	0 (0)	0	2 (0)	0	N/A	N/A	19(0)	0
