= Hou Junjie =

Chinese footballer

Hou Junjie 侯俊杰
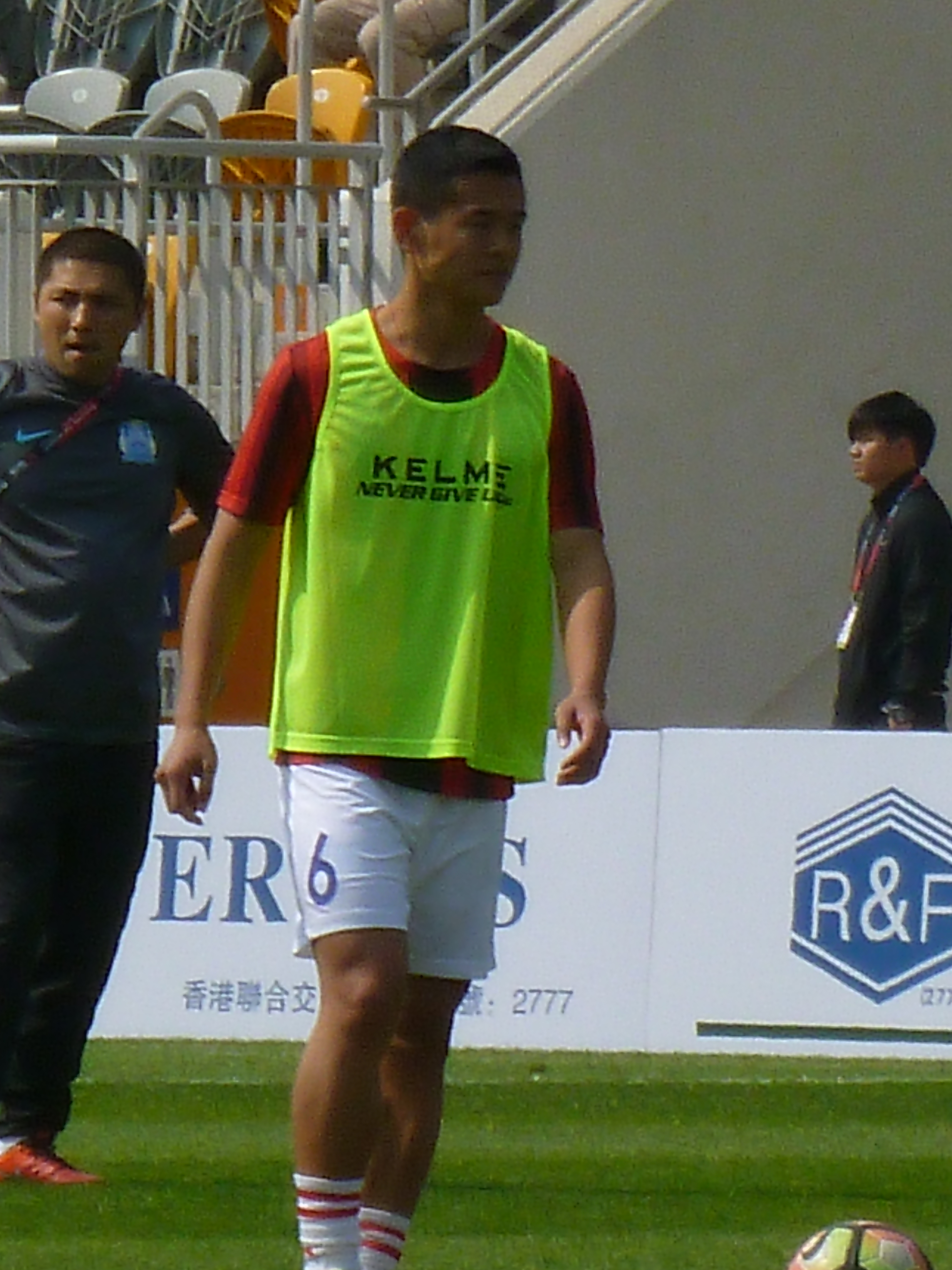

Personal information
- Full name: Hou Junjie
- Date of birth: 8 July 1993 (age 33)
- Place of birth: Jingjiang, Jiangsu, China
- Height: 1.72 m (5 ft 8 in)
- Position: Midfielder

Team information
- Current team: Guangzhou R&F

Youth career
- Shanghai Shenhua

Senior career*
Years	Team	Apps	(Gls)
2011–2012	Shanghai Zobon	?	(?)
2014–2015	Shanghai Shenxin	12	(1)
2016–	Guangzhou R&F	0	(0)
2016–2019	→ R&F (loan)	36	(1)
- * Club domestic league appearances and goals as of 31 December 2020

Hou Junjie (Chinese: 侯俊杰; born 8 July 1993 in Jingjiang) is a Chinese professional football player who currently plays for Chinese Super League side Guangzhou R&F as a midfielder.

== Club career ==
Hou Junjie started his professional football career in 2011 when he joined Shanghai Zobon for the 2011 China League Two campaign. He transferred to Chinese Super League side Shanghai Shenxin in 2014. He made his league debut for Shanghai Shenxin on 22 March 2014 in a 3–1 home defeat against Guangzhou R&F. He scored his Super League goal on 24 August 2014, which ensured Shanghai Shenxin beat Jiangsu Sainty 3–0.

On 25 February 2016, Hou transferred to fellow Super League side Guangzhou R&F. In August 2016, he was loaned to Hong Kong Premier League side R&F, which was the satellite team of Guangzhou R&F.

== Career statistics ==
Statistics accurate as of match played 31 December 2020.

Appearances and goals by club, season and competition
Club	Season	League			National Cup		League Cup		Continental		Other		Total	
Club	Season	Division	Apps	Goals	Apps	Goals	Apps	Goals	Apps	Goals	Apps	Goals	Apps	Goals
Shanghai Zobon	2011	China League Two			-		-		-		-			
Shanghai Zobon	2012	China League Two			0	0	-		-		-			
Shanghai Zobon	Total		0	0	0	0	0	0	0	0	0	0	!0	0
Shanghai Shenxin	2014	Chinese Super League	12	1	3	0	-		-		-		15	1
Shanghai Shenxin	2015	Chinese Super League	0	0	1	0	-		-		-		1	0
Shanghai Shenxin	Total		0	0	0	0	0	0	0	0	0	0	0	0
Guangzhou R&F	2016	Chinese Super League	0	0	0	0	-		-		-		0	0
R&F (loan)	2016–17	Hong Kong Premier League	16	0	0	0	1 (Note: Appearances in Hong Kong Senior Challenge Shield)	0	-		1 (Note: Appearances in Hong Kong Sapling Cup)	0	18	0
R&F (loan)	2017–18	Hong Kong Premier League	14	1	1	0	0	0	-		4	0	19	1
R&F (loan)	2018–19	Hong Kong Premier League	6	0	0	0	0	0	-		4	0	6	0
R&F (loan)	Total		36	1	1	0	1	0	0	0	9	0	47	1
Career total			48	2	5	0	1	0	0	0	9	0	63	2
