= Min Junlin =

Chinese footballer

Min Junlin 闵俊麟
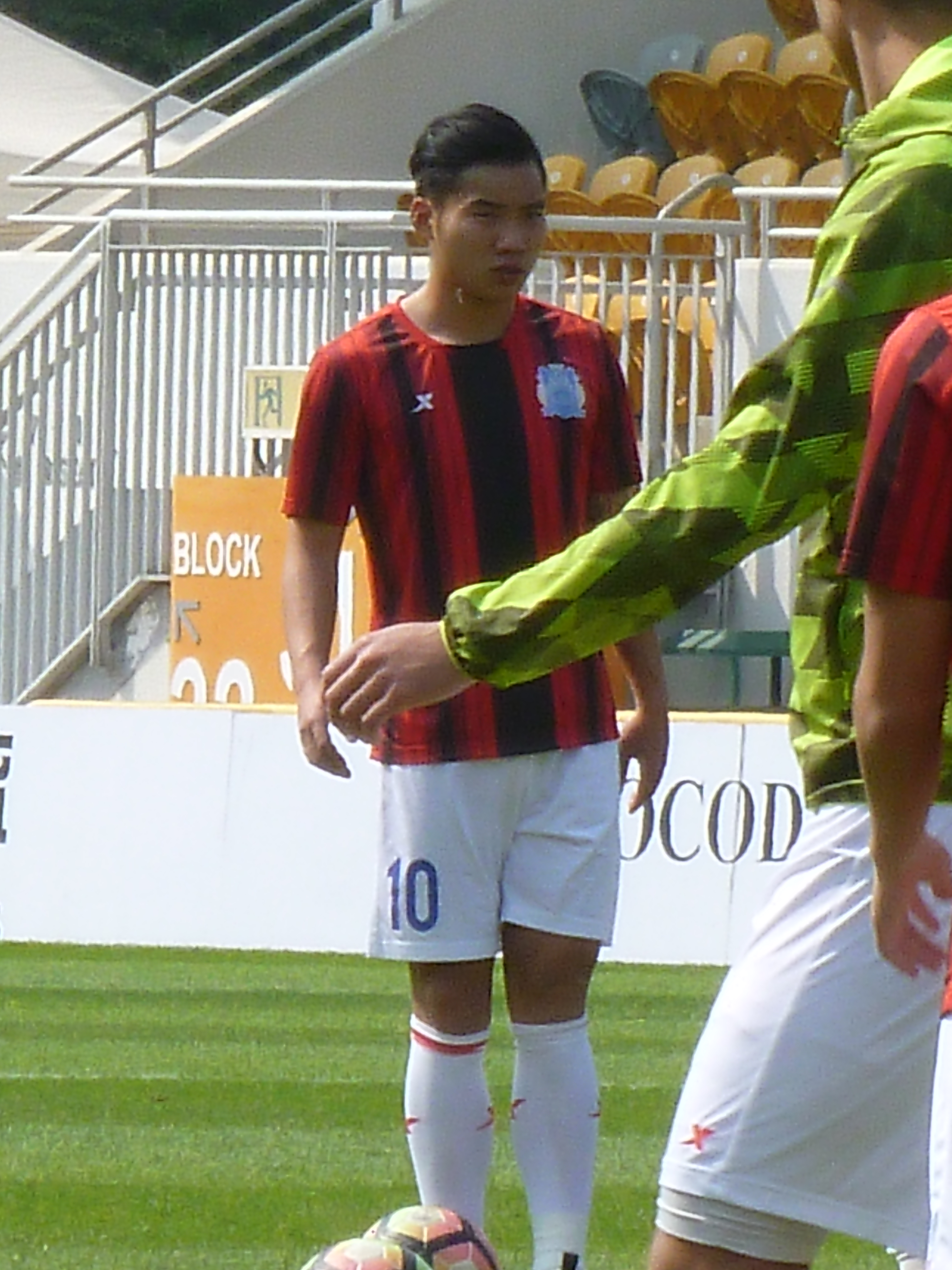

Personal information
- Date of birth: 19 January 1994 (age 32)
- Place of birth: Leshan, Sichuan, China
- Height: 1.78 m (5 ft 10 in)
- Position: Midfielder

Youth career
- Chengdu Blades

Senior career*
Years	Team	Apps	(Gls)
2014–2017	Guangzhou R&F	3	(0)
2016–2017	→ R&F (loan)	12	(0)
2017	→ Guizhou Hengfeng (loan)	29	(3)
2018–2021	Guizhou Hengfeng	69	(2)
2021–2023	Chengdu Rongcheng	17	(0)
2023	→ Suzhou Dongwu (loan)	0	(0)
2024	Guizhou Guiyang Athletic	0	(0)

International career
2013	China U20		
- * Club domestic league appearances and goals as of 8 January 2023

Min Junlin (Chinese: 闵俊麟; pinyin: Mǐn Jùnlín; Mandarin pronunciation: [mìn tɕŷn lǐn]; born 19 January 1994 in Leshan), former name Min Quanxin (Chinese: 闵泉鑫; pinyin: Mǐn Quánxīn; Mandarin pronunciation: [mìn.tɕʰɥɛ̌n.ɕín]), is a Chinese football player.

== Club career ==
Min joined Chinese Super League side Guangzhou R&F in the summer of 2014 season. He made his senior debut on 10 February 2015, in the preliminary round 2 of 2015 AFC Champions League qualifying play-off against Warriors FC, coming on as a substitute for Jiang Ning. In August 2016, he was loaned to Hong Kong Premier League side R&F, which was the satellite team of Guangzhou R&F. He made his debut on 18 September 2016 in the 2016–17 Hong Kong Senior Challenge Shield against BC Glory Sky.

On 24 February 2017, Min was loaned to Super League newcomer Guizhou Zhicheng for one season. He made his debut for Guizhou on 3 March 2017 in a 1–1 home draw against Liaoning FC. On 27 May 2017, he scored his first senior goal in a 2–2 home draw against Jiangsu Suning. He scored his second goal of the season on 22 July 2017, in a 4–3 home win against Hebei China Fortune. His third goal came on 13 August 2017 against parent club Guangzhou R&F in a 2–0 win for Guizhou. In the 2017 season, Min played the third highest number of minutes of any under 23 player in the CSL. He made a permanent transfer to Guizhou Hengfeng on 26 February 2018.

On 8 July 2021, Min transferred to another second tier club in Chengdu Rongcheng. He would go on to make his debut on 17 July 2021 in a league game against Liaoning Shenyang Urban that ended in a 6-0 victory. He would be a regular part of the team as the club gained promotion to the top tier at the end of the 2021 league campaign.

== Career statistics ==
Statistics accurate as of match played 8 January 2023.

Appearances and goals by club, season and competition
Club	Season	League			National Cup		League Cup		Continental		Other		Total	
Club	Season	Division	Apps	Goals	Apps	Goals	Apps	Goals	Apps	Goals	Apps	Goals	Apps	Goals
Guangzhou R&F	2014	Chinese Super League	0	0	0	0	-		-		-		0	0
Guangzhou R&F	2015	Chinese Super League	3	0	1	0	-		2	0	-		6	0
Guangzhou R&F	2016	Chinese Super League	0	0	0	0	-		-		-		0	0
Guangzhou R&F	Total		3	0	1	0	0	0	2	0	0	0	6	0
R&F (loan)	2016–17	Hong Kong Premier League	12	0	1	0	1 (Note: Appearances in Hong Kong Senior Challenge Shield)	0	-		1 (Note: Appearances in Hong Kong Sapling Cup)	0	15	0
Guizhou Hengfeng (loan)	2017	Chinese Super League	29	3	0	0	-		-		-		29	3
Guizhou Hengfeng	2018	Chinese Super League	26	0	3	0	-		-		-		29	0
Guizhou Hengfeng	2019	China League One	22	2	0	0	-		-		-		22	2
Guizhou Hengfeng	2020	China League One	13	0	1	0	-		-		-		14	0
Guizhou Hengfeng	2021	China League One	8	0	0	0	-		-		-		8	0
Guizhou Hengfeng	Total		69	2	4	0	0	0	0	0	0	0	73	2
Chengdu Rongcheng	2021	China League One	12	0	3	0	-		-		1 (Note: Appearance(s) in CSL Relegation play-offs)	0	16	0
Chengdu Rongcheng	2022	Chinese Super League	5	0	4	0	-		-		-		9	0
Chengdu Rongcheng	Total		17	0	7	0	0	0	0	0	1	0	25	0
Career total			130	5	13	0	1	0	2	0	2	0	148	5
