= Yang Ziyi =

Chinese footballer

Yang Ziyi 杨子艺
Personal information
- Full name: Yang Ziyi
- Date of birth: 14 December 1995 (age 30)
- Place of birth: Guangzhou, Guangdong, China
- Height: 1.80 m (5 ft 11 in)
- Position: Midfielder

Senior career*
Years	Team	Apps	(Gls)
2016–2018	R&F	28	(1)
- * Club domestic league appearances and goals as of 31 March 2018

Yang Ziyi (simplified Chinese: 杨子艺; traditional Chinese: 楊子藝; pinyin: Yáng Zǐyì; born 14 December 1995) is a Chinese footballer.

== Club career ==
Yang Ziyi started his professional football career in August 2016 when he joined Hong Kong Premier League side R&F (Hong Kong), which was the satellite team of Chinese Super League side Guangzhou R&F. He made his senior league debut on 23 October 2016 in a 2–0 home defeat against Wofoo Tai Po. Yang played 14 league matches for R&F in the 2016–17 season and stayed at the club for another season. On 19 September 2017, he scored his first senior goal in a 3–2 away loss against Hong Kong Pegasus.

== Career statistics ==
As of 31 March 2018

Club performance			League		Cup		League Cup		Continental		Total	
Season	Club	League	Apps	Goals	Apps	Goals	Apps	Goals	Apps	Goals	Apps	Goals
Hong Kong			League		FA Cup		League Cups^{1}		Asia		Total	
2016–17	R&F	Hong Kong Premier League	14	0	1	0	1	0	-		16	0
2017–18	R&F	Hong Kong Premier League	14	1	1	0	5	0	-		20	1
Total	Hong Kong		28	1	2	0	6	0	0	0	36	1
Career total			28	1	2	0	6	0	0	0	36	1

^{1}League Cups include Hong Kong Senior Challenge Shield and Hong Kong Sapling Cup.
