= Tan Chun Lok =

Hong Kong footballer

Tan Chun Lok 陳俊樂
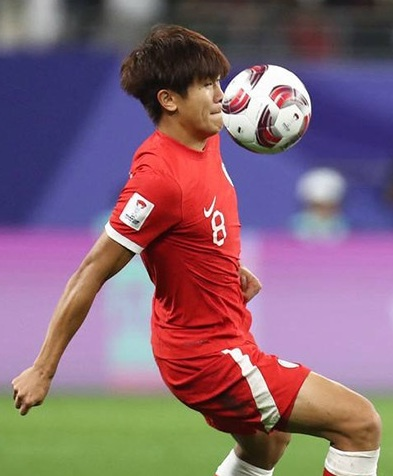
- Tan playing for Hong Kong at the 2023 AFC Asian Cup

Personal information
- Full name: Mark Tan Chun Lok
- Date of birth: 15 January 1996 (age 30)
- Place of birth: Tuen Mun, British Hong Kong
- Height: 1.75 m (5 ft 9 in)
- Position: Midfielder

Team information
- Current team: Kitchee
- Number: 16

Youth career
- 2007–2009: Eastern
- 2009: Brooke House College
- 2009–2011: Peterborough United
- 2011–2013: Northampton Town

Senior career*
Years	Team	Apps	(Gls)
2013–2015	Yokohama FC Hong Kong	23	(2)
2015–2016	Pegasus	13	(0)
2016–2018	Tai Po	32	(1)
2018–2022	Guangzhou City	36	(1)
2018–2019	→ R&F (loan)	17	(2)
2023–	Kitchee	53	(2)

International career^{‡}
2013–2015	Hong Kong U19		
2016	Hong Kong U21	2	(0)
2014–2019	Hong Kong U23	4	(0)
2015–	Hong Kong	64	(3)
Medal record
Men's football
Representing Hong Kong
FIFA ASEAN Challenge Cup
Winner	2026 Hong Kong
- * Club domestic league appearances and goals as of 21 November 2026 ‡ National team caps and goals as of 3 October 2026

Mark Tan Chun Lok (Chinese: 陳俊樂; born 15 January 1996) is a Hong Kong professional footballer who currently plays as a midfielder for Hong Kong Premier League club Kitchee and the Hong Kong national team.

== Early career ==
Tan graduated from Diocesan Boys' School and Hong Kong Baptist University.

In 2009, he won a Dreams Come True scholarship which allowed him to complete his high school studies in Britain at the Brooke House College Football Academy with all costs covered. Tan signed a professional contract with Peterborough United in January 2010 after a six-week trial.

== Club career ==
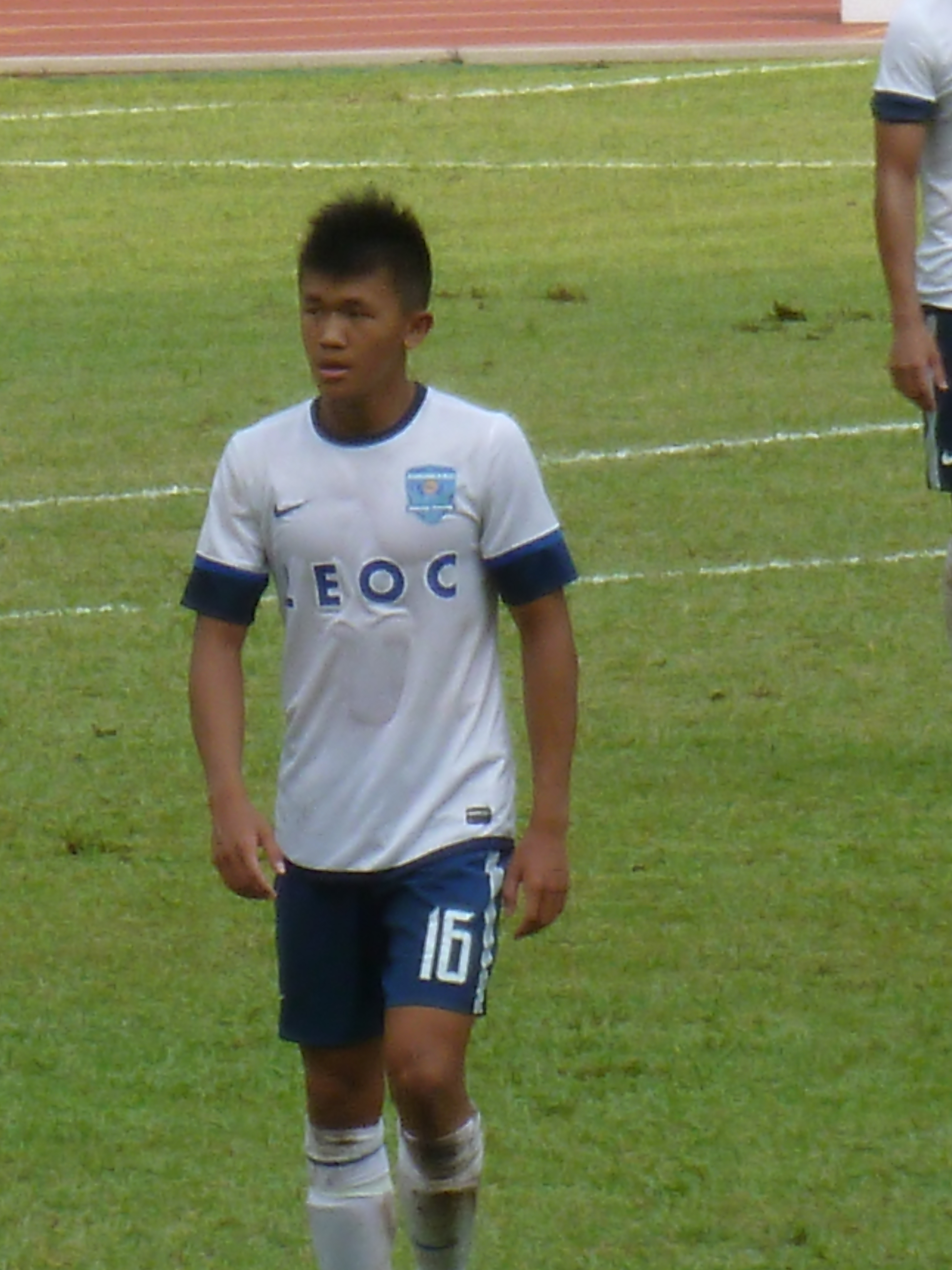
Tan playing for Yokohama FC Hong Kong in 2013

In 2013, Tan returned to Hong Kong and signed with Yokohama FC Hong Kong.

In 2015, Tan joined Pegasus.

Stating Tan was not ready to move to a big club yet, he joined Tai Po in 2016. He earned the Best Young Player award for the second consecutive year during the 2016-17 season.

Following two years at Tai Po, Tan signed a three-and-a-half-year contract with Chinese Super League side Guangzhou R&F on 13 July 2018.

On 26 October 2019, Tan made his debut for Guangzhou R&F in Chinese Super League after substituting Zou Zheng in the 87th minute during the game against Hebei China Fortune. He became a regular first team member in the 2021 season in which he was deployed as an attacking midfielder in several occasions.

On 21 April 2023, Tan returned to Hong Kong and joined Kitchee. He signed a two-year contract until 2025.

== International career ==
Tan is a member of the Hong Kong national under-23 football team that plays in the 2014 Asian Games. He broke his leg in the match against Bangladesh and has to return to Hong Kong for treatment, missing the last 16 clash against hosts South Korea.

He made his full international debut in a friendly against Thailand on 9 October 2015.

Tan scored his first international goal on 13 June 2017 against North Korea.

On 13 July 2018, Tan's club Guangzhou R&F confirmed that they would release him to participate in the 2018 Asian Games.

On 26 December 2023, Tan was named in Hong Kong's squad for the 2023 AFC Asian Cup.

== Personal life ==
Tan's elder brother Tan Ka Lok was also a professional footballer. He played for First Division clubs Eastern District and Sun Hei.

== Career statistics ==
=== Club ===
Statistics accurate as of match played 31 January 2023.

Appearances and goals by club, season and competition
Club	Season	League			National Cup		League Cup		Continental		Others		Total	
Club	Season	Division	Apps	Goals	Apps	Goals	Apps	Goals	Apps	Goals	Apps	Goals	Apps	Goals
YFCMD	2013–14	Hong Kong First Division	15	0	1	0	–		–		0	0	16	0
YFCMD	2014–15	Hong Kong Premier League	8	2	3	0	0	0	–		2 (Note: Appearances in the 2014–15 Hong Kong season play-off)	0	13	2
YFCMD	Total		23	2	4	0	0	0	0	0	2	0	29	2
Pegasus	2015–16	Hong Kong Premier League	13	0	3	0	2	0	–		7 (Note: One appearance in the Hong Kong Senior Challenge Shield, Five appearances in the Hong Kong Sapling Cup & One appearance in the 2015–16 Hong Kong season play-off)	0	25	0
Tai Po	2016–17	Hong Kong Premier League	15	0	1	0	–		–		7 (Note: Three appearances in the Hong Kong Senior Challenge Shield & Four appearances and two goals in the Hong Kong Sapling Cup)	2	23	2
Tai Po	2017–18	Hong Kong Premier League	17	1	3	0	–		–		7 (Note: One appearance in the Hong Kong Senior Challenge Shield & Six appearances and one goal in the Hong Kong Sapling Cup)	1	27	2
Tai Po	Total		32	1	4	0	0	0	0	0	14	3	50	4
Guangzhou City	2018	Chinese Super League	0	0	0	0	–		–		–		0	0
Guangzhou City	2019	Chinese Super League	3	0	0	0	–		–		–		3	0
Guangzhou City	2020	Chinese Super League	5	0	0	0	–		–		–		5	0
Guangzhou City	2021	Chinese Super League	15	0	1	0	–		–		–		16	0
Guangzhou City	2022	Chinese Super League	13	1	0	0	–		–		–		13	1
Guangzhou City	Total		36	1	1	0	0	0	0	0	0	0	37	1
R&F (loan)	2018–19	Hong Kong Premier League	17	2	1	0	–		–		4 (Note: Two appearances in the Hong Kong Senior Challenge Shield & Two appearances in the Hong Kong Sapling Cup)	0	22	2
Career total			121	6	12	0	2	0	0	0	27	3	163	9

=== International ===
As of 3 October 2026

National team	Year	Apps	Goals
Hong Kong	2015	3	0
Hong Kong	2016	3	0
Hong Kong	2017	10	1
Hong Kong	2018	5	0
Hong Kong	2019	9	1
Hong Kong	2020	0	0
Hong Kong	2021	0	0
Hong Kong	2022	3	0
Hong Kong	2023	8	1
Hong Kong	2024	9	0
Hong Kong	2025	9	0
Hong Kong	2026	5	0
Total		64	3

Scores and results list Hong Kong's goal tally first.

No	Date	Cap	Venue	Opponent	Score	Result	Competition
1.	13 June 2017	10	Hong Kong Stadium, So Kon Po, Hong Kong	North Korea	1–0	1–1	2019 AFC Asian Cup qualification
2.	5 September 2019	23	Phnom Penh Olympic Stadium, Phnom Penh, Cambodia	Cambodia	1–0	1–1	2022 FIFA World Cup qualification
3.	11 September 2023	37	Hong Kong Stadium, So Kon Po, Hong Kong	Brunei	2–0	10–0	Friendly

== Honours ==
Pegasus

- Hong Kong Sapling Cup: 2015–16

Tai Po

- Hong Kong Sapling Cup: 2016–17

Kitchee

- Hong Kong Premier League: 2025–26
- Hong Kong Senior Shield: 2023–24

Hong Kong

- FIFA ASEAN Challenge Cup: 2026

Individual

- Best Young Player: 2015–16, 2016–17
