= 2016–17 Hong Kong Senior Shield =

Tournament details
- Country: Hong Kong
- Teams: 11

Final positions
- Champions: Kitchee (6th title)
- Runners-up: Eastern

Tournament statistics
- Matches played: 10
- Goals scored: 24 (2.4 per match)
- Attendance: 15,653 (1,565 per match)

2016–17 Hong Kong Senior Shield (officially known as 2016–17 HKFA Canbo Senior Shield due to sponsorship reasons) was the 115th season of one of the Asian oldest football knockout competitions, Hong Kong Senior Shield. Eleven teams entered this edition, with three games being played in the first round before the quarter-final stage. The competition was only open to teams that played in the 2016–17 Hong Kong Premier League.

Kitchee won the final over Eastern.

== Calendar ==
Stage	Round	Date
Knockout	First round	17 – 18 September 2016
Knockout	Quarter-final	28 – 30 October 2016
Knockout	Semi-final	25 – 26 December 2016
Knockout	Final	15 January 2017

== Bracket ==
First round
Rangers	0 (3)
**Pegasus (p)**	**0 (4)**
Yuen Long	0
**Tai Po**	**1**
(China) R&F	0
**Biu Chun Glory Sky**	**1**

Quarter-finals
**Kitchee**	**3**
Pegasus	0
South China	0
**Tai Po**	1
**Eastern**	**4**
Biu Chun Glory Sky	1
**Southern**	**5**
HKFC	1

Semi-finals
**Kitchee**	**2**
Tai Po	1
**Eastern**	**1**
Southern	0

Final
**Kitchee**	**2**
Eastern	1

Bold = winner
* = after extra time, ( ) = penalty shootout score

== Fixtures and results ==
=== First round ===
17 September 2016	Rangers	**0–0** (a.e.t.) (**3–4** p)	**Pegasus**	Tsing Yi Sports Ground
14:30 UTC+8		Report		Attendance: 585; Referee: Ng Chiu Kok
	**Penalties**
	Hui Ka Lok (penalty scored); Clayton (penalty scored); Tse Long Hin (penalty scored)		Emir (penalty scored); Dhiego (penalty scored); Lai Lok Yin (penalty scored); Kwok Kin Pong (penalty scored)

18 September 2016	Yuen Long	**0–1**	**Tai Po**	Tsing Yi Sports Ground
14:30 UTC+8		Report	Wong Wai 62'	Attendance: 539; Referee: Ho Wai Sing

18 September 2016	R&F	**0–1**	**Biu Chun Glory Sky**	Yuen Long Stadium
17:30 UTC+8		Report	María 25'	Attendance: 307; Referee: Chan Ming Siu

=== Quarter-finals ===
28 October 2016	**Kitchee**	**3–0**	Pegasus	Mong Kok Stadium
20:00 UTC+8	Lam 38', 47' (pen.); Sandro 56'	Report		Attendance: 1,004; Referee: Luk Kin Sun

29 October 2016	South China	**0–1**	**Tai Po**	Mongkok Stadium
14:30 UTC+8		Report	Wong Wai 70'	Attendance: 1,345; Referee: Lau Fong Hei

29 October 2016	**Eastern**	**4–1**	Biu Chun Glory Sky	Tsing Yi Sports Ground
17:30 UTC+8	Lee Hong Lim 47', 50'; Giovane 86'; McKee 90+3'	Report	Everton 10'	Attendance: 446; Referee: Ng Chiu Kok

30 October 2016	**Southern**	**5–1**	HKFC	Tsing Yi Sports Ground
14:30 UTC+8	Wellingsson 4'; Liang Zicheng 37'; Ha 55', 58'; Walter 80'	Report	Bacon 11'	Attendance: 316; Referee: Ho Wai Sing

=== Semi-finals ===
25 December 2016	**Kitchee**	**2–1**	Tai Po	Mong Kok Stadium
15:00 UTC+8	Dudu 51' (o.g.); Sandro 83'	Report	Nakamura 60'	Attendance: 2,235; Referee: Ng Chiu Kok

26 December 2016	**Eastern**	**1–0**	Southern	Mong Kok Stadium
15:00 UTC+8	Giovane 67'	Report		Attendance: 2,660; Referee: Tong Kui Sum

=== Final ===
15 January 2017	**Kitchee**	**2–1**	Eastern	Hong Kong Stadium
15:00 UTC+8	Lam 16'; Lum 78'	Report	Šarić 54'	Attendance: 6,216; Referee: Liu Kwok Man
