= R&F (Hong Kong) =

- Full name: R&F (Hong Kong) Soccer Limited 富力（香港）足球有限公司
- Founded: 2016
- Dissolved: 2020
- Ground: Yanzigang Stadium, Guangzhou
- Capacity: 2,000
- Website: www.gzrffc.com.cn
Home colours	Away colours

R&F
- Chinese: 富力R&F
Transcriptions
Standard Mandarin
- Hanyu Pinyin: FùlìR&F
Yue: Cantonese
- Jyutping: fu3 lik6 R&F

R&F (Hong Kong) Soccer Limited (Chinese: 富力（香港）足球有限公司), commonly known as R&F (Chinese: 富力R&F), was an association football team based in Guangzhou, China which competed in the Hong Kong Premier League between 2016 and 2020. It was owned by Chinese property developers R&F Properties as a satellite team of Chinese Super League side Guangzhou City.

The club's name "R&F" is short for "Rich" (富) and "Force" (力) in Mandarin Chinese.

== History ==
R&F were founded and registered at the Hong Kong Football Association in the summer of 2016. As a satellite team of Chinese Super League side Guangzhou City, most of its players were loanees from the Guangzhou City reserves. On 1 August 2016, they were accepted into the Hong Kong Premier League with following conditions: (1) Signing at least eight Hong Kong players. (2) Using at least three Hong Kong players in a match. (3) Sponsoring a cup competition with a fee of $1 million. The club finished their inaugural season in 10th place with 3 wins, 1 draw and 16 defeats in the 2016–17 Hong Kong Premier League, which secured their position in the top flight for the next season.

In June 2017, R&F was allowed to move their home matches to Yanzigang Stadium in Guangzhou after previously using Siu Sai Wan Sports Ground as their stadium. They were permitted to register three foreigners for the 2017–18 Hong Kong Premier League season. R&F signed Brazilian Giovane from Eastern as well as four naturalized Hong Kong players Vas Núñez, Roberto, Itaparica and Godfred Karikari in their squad, hoping to be a more competitive team.

After another disappointing season, R&F abandoned their mission of training Guangzhou City's reserve players. Starting with the 2018–19 season, the club's budget was increased to HK$50 million and the squad was composed mainly of Hong Kong players. Chairman Huang Shenghua claimed that the club's goal was to win at least one trophy in the season and applied for full membership within the HKFA in order to represent Hong Kong in Asian Football Confederation club competitions. The club finished as runners-up, five points behind Tai Po.

On 28 June 2019, it was confirmed that the HKFA had accepted R&F's proposal to follow the same registration rules as other HKPL clubs. This moved meant that R&F could now register up to seven foreigners, while Chinese passport holders would no longer qualify as local players.

After 4 years in the HKPL, R&F officially announced that they would withdraw from the league on 14 October 2020.

== Honours ==
=== League ===
- Hong Kong Premier League

Runners-up (1): 2018–19

== Results ==
=== All-time league rankings ===
As of 11 October 2020

Year	Div	Pld	W	D	L	GF	GA	GD	Pts	Pos.	FA Cup	Senior Challenge Shield	Sapling Cup	Att./G	Stadium
2016–17	1	20	3	1	16	13	53	-40	10	10	R1	R1	R2	207	Siu Sai Wan Sports Ground
2017–18	1	18	7	1	10	27	35	-8	22	7	R1	R1	Group stage	797	Yanzigang Stadium
2018–19	1	18	11	3	4	51	26	25	36	2	QF	SF	Group stage	707	Yanzigang Stadium
2019–20	1	10	5	3	2	21	15	6	18	3	Runner-up	SF	Group stage	388	Yanzigang Stadium

=== Managerial history ===
As of 11 October 2020

#	Name	Period	Pld	W	D	L	GF	GA	GD	Win%	Honours
1	(China) Li Zhihai	July 2016 – May 2017	23	3	1	19	14	62	−48	13.04	
2	(Poland) Marek Zając	June 2017 – 12 March 2018	18	6	1	11	22	36	−14	33.33	
3	(China) Bito Wu	12 March 2018 – 3 June 2018	6	2	0	4	11	13	−2	33.33	
4	(Hong Kong) Yeung Ching Kwong	14 June 2018 – 14 October 2020	52	29	9	14	134	74	+60	55.77	

== Past and present internationals ==
Names in bold indicate players who had international appearances for their countries while playing for R&F.

Burkina Faso

- Adama Guira (2019–2020)

China

- Wu Weian (2018–2019)

Hong Kong

- Chuck Yiu Kwok (2016–2017)
- **Roberto** (2017–2020)
- **Giovane** (2017–2020)
- **Itaparica** (2017–2019)
- Godfred Karikari (2018–2019)
- Bai He (2018–2020)
- **Leung Nok Hang** (2018–2020)
- Lo Kong Wai (2018–2020)
- Lo Kwan Yee (2018–2020)
- Paulinho (2018–2019)
- **Tan Chun Lok** (2018–2019)
- Fong Pak Lun (2019–2020)
- Lam Ka Wai (2020)
- Tsui Wang Kit (2020)
- Fung Hing Wa (2020)

Congo

- Emmerson (2019)

Ecuador

- Daniel Angulo (2020)
