= 2017–18 R&F (Hong Kong) season =

R&F (Hong Kong) 2017–18
- Chairman: Huang Shenghua (黄盛华)
- Manager: Marek Zając (to March 12, 2018); Bito Wu (interim)
- Stadium: Yanzigang Stadium, Guangzhou
- Premier League: 7th
- Senior Shield: First Round
- FA Cup: First Round
- Sapling Cup: Group stage
Home colours	Away colours

The 2017–18 season is R&F's 2nd season in the top-tier division in Hong Kong football. R&F will compete in the Premier League, Senior Challenge Shield, FA Cup and Sapling Cup in this season. In June 2017, R&F was allowed to move their home stadium to Yanzigang Stadium, Guangzhou and register 3 foreigners for the 2017–18 Hong Kong Premier League.

== Coaching staff ==
Position	Staff
Head coach	(Poland) Marek Zając (to 12 March 2018)
Head coach	(United States) Bito Wu (from 12 March 2018)
Team leader	(China) Wu Weian
Assistant coach	(China) Wu Weian
Assistant coach	(Scotland) Andy McNeil
Goalkeeping coach	(China) Sun Ce
Team physician	(China) Liu Yihao
Physiotherapist	(China) Liu Zhixing

== Squad ==
=== Summer ===
As of 18 August 2017

Note: Flags indicate national team as defined under FIFA eligibility rules; some limited exceptions apply. Players may hold more than one non-FIFA nationality.

No.	Pos.	Nation	Player
1	GK	(China) CHN	Pei Chensong
4	DF	(China) CHN	Zhao Ming
5	DF	(Mexico) MEX	Vas Núñez ^{LP}
6	MF	(China) CHN	Hou Junjie
7	MF	(China) CHN	Deng Yanlin
8	MF	(China) CHN	Wu Weian
9	FW	(Brazil) BRA	Bruninho ^{FP}
10	MF	(Hong Kong) HKG	Itaparica
11	FW	(Serbia) SRB	Marko Perović ^{FP} (Captain)
12	GK	(China) CHN	Zhou Yuchen
13	MF	(China) CHN	Chen Fuhai
14	MF	(China) CHN	Zhang Jiajie
15	DF	(Hong Kong) HKG	Roberto (Vice-captain)
17	MF	(China) CHN	Yang Ziyi
18	DF	(China) CHN	Liang Yongfeng

No.	Pos.	Nation	Player
19	FW	(Hong Kong) HKG	Tsang Kin Fong
21	DF	(China) CHN	Liang Zhanhao
22	FW	(Brazil) BRA	Giovane Alves da Silva ^{FP}
23	MF	(China) CHN	He Zilin
27	DF	(China) CHN	Zhong Ke
28	MF	(Hong Kong) HKG	Chow Cheuk Fung
33	MF	(China) CHN	Wang Xinhui
41	FW	(Hong Kong) HKG	Wong Kai Yiu
42	MF	(Hong Kong) HKG	Ng Man Hin
44	DF	(Hong Kong) HKG	Hung Lau
45	GK	(Hong Kong) HKG	Law King Hei
77	FW	(China) CHN	Li Rui
98	GK	(China) CHN	Chen Zirong
99	DF	(China) CHN	Wang Erduo

=== Winter ===
As of 2 February 2018

Note: Flags indicate national team as defined under FIFA eligibility rules; some limited exceptions apply. Players may hold more than one non-FIFA nationality.

No.	Pos.	Nation	Player
1	GK	(China) CHN	Ji Xiangzheng
4	DF	(China) CHN	Zhao Ming
5	DF	(Mexico) MEX	Vas Núñez ^{LP}
6	MF	(China) CHN	Hou Junjie
7	MF	(China) CHN	Deng Yanlin
8	MF	(China) CHN	Wu Weian
9	FW	(Brazil) BRA	Bruninho ^{FP}
10	MF	(Hong Kong) HKG	Itaparica
11	FW	(Hong Kong) HKG	Godfred Karikari
12	GK	(China) CHN	Zhou Yuchen
13	MF	(China) CHN	Chen Fuhai
14	MF	(China) CHN	Zhang Jiajie
15	DF	(Hong Kong) HKG	Roberto (Captain)
17	MF	(China) CHN	Yang Ziyi
18	DF	(China) CHN	Liang Yongfeng

No.	Pos.	Nation	Player
19	FW	(Hong Kong) HKG	Tsang Kin Fong
22	FW	(Brazil) BRA	Giovane Alves da Silva ^{FP}
23	MF	(China) CHN	He Zilin
25	FW	(Brazil) BRA	Tiago Leonço ^{FP}
27	DF	(China) CHN	Zhong Ke
28	MF	(Hong Kong) HKG	Chow Cheuk Fung
29	FW	(China) CHN	Liang Zheyu
33	MF	(China) CHN	Wang Xinhui
41	FW	(Hong Kong) HKG	Wong Kai Yiu
42	MF	(Hong Kong) HKG	Ng Man Hin
44	DF	(Hong Kong) HKG	Hung Lau
45	GK	(Hong Kong) HKG	Law King Hei
77	FW	(China) CHN	Li Rui
98	GK	(China) CHN	Chen Zirong
99	DF	(China) CHN	Wang Erduo

== Transfers ==
=== In ===
==== Summer ====
Squad number	Position	Player	Moving from	Type
1	GK	(China) Pei Chensong	(China) Guangzhou R&F	Loan
4	DF	(China) Zhao Ming	(China) Guangzhou R&F	Loan
5	DF	(Mexico) Vas Núñez	(Hong Kong) Eastern	
7	MF	(China) Deng Yanlin	(China) Guangzhou R&F	Loan
8	MF	(China) Wu Weian		Free agent
9	FW	(Brazil) Bruninho	(China) Guangzhou R&F	Loan
10	MF	(Hong Kong) Itaparica	(Hong Kong) Tai Po	
11	FW	(Serbia) Marko Perović	(Hong Kong) South China	Free agent
12	GK	(China) Zhou Yuchen	(China) Shandong Luneng Taishan	Loan
13	MF	(China) Chen Fuhai	(China) Guangzhou R&F	Loan
14	MF	(China) Zhang Jiajie	(China) Guangzhou R&F	Loan
15	DF	(Hong Kong) Roberto	(Hong Kong) Eastern	
18	DF	(China) Liang Yongfeng	(China) Guangzhou R&F	Loan
21	DF	(China) Liang Zhanhao	(China) Guangzhou R&F	Loan
22	FW	(Brazil) Giovane	(Hong Kong) Eastern	
28	MF	(Hong Kong) Chow Cheuk Fung	(Hong Kong) Rangers	
33	MF	(China) Wang Xinhui	(China) Guangzhou R&F	Loan
77	FW	(China) Li Rui	(Portugal) Braga	
98	GK	(China) Chen Zirong	(China) Guangzhou R&F	Loan
99	DF	(China) Wang Erduo	(China) Guangzhou R&F	Loan

==== Winter ====
Squad number	Position	Player	Moving from	Type
1	GK	(China) Ji Xiangzheng	(China) Guangzhou R&F	Loan
11	FW	(Hong Kong) Godfred Karikari	(China) Qingdao Huanghai	Free agent
25	FW	(Brazil) Tiago Leonço	(Cyprus) AEL Limassol	
29	FW	(China) Liang Zheyu		Free agent

=== Out ===
==== Summer ====
Squad number	Position	Player	Moving to	Type
1	GK	(China) Long Wenhao	(China) Guangzhou R&F	Loan return
3	MF	(China) Xiang Wenjun		
7	FW	(Hong Kong) Chuck Yiu Kwok	(Hong Kong) Biu Chun Rangers	End of contract
11	MF	(China) Ning An	(China) Guangzhou R&F	Loan return
13	FW	(Hong Kong) Liang Zicheng		
15	MF	(Hong Kong) Lam Hin Ting	(Hong Kong) Dreams FC	
16	DF	(China) Zhu Di	(China) Guangzhou R&F	Loan return
18	DF	(China) Xiang Jiachi		
19	DF	(China) Ma Weichao	(China) Guangzhou R&F Reserve team	Loan return
21	FW	(Hong Kong) Lau Tak Yan	(Hong Kong) Dreams FC	
24	DF	(China) Wei Zongren	(China) Guangzhou R&F Reserve team	Loan return
25	DF	(Hong Kong) Lam Wan Kit	(Hong Kong) Dreams FC	
26	MF	(Hong Kong) Jing Teng	(Hong Kong) Wong Tai Sin	
29	FW	(Hong Kong) Chen Liming	(Hong Kong) Wong Tai Sin	
30	DF	(China) Fu Yunlong	(China) Guangzhou R&F	Loan return
33	GK	(China) Xing Yu	(China) Guangzhou R&F Reserve team	Loan return
35	FW	(China) Mai Jiajian	(China) Guangzhou R&F	Loan return
44	DF	(China) Kuang Haokun		
55	DF	(China) Tu Dongxu	(China) Meizhou Techand	
66	DF	(China) Huang Haoxuan		

==== Winter ====
Squad number	Position	Player	Moving to	Type
1	GK	(China) Pei Chensong	(China) Guangzhou R&F	Loan return
11	FW	(Serbia) Marko Perović	(China) Guangzhou R&F	
21	DF	(China) Liang Zhanhao	(China) Guangzhou R&F	Loan return

== Pre-season and friendlies ==
=== Training matches ===
24 July 2017	(Thailand)	2 - 2	(Hong Kong) R&F	Thailand

27 July 2017	(Thailand) Samutsongkhram	2 - 0	(Hong Kong) R&F	Thailand

31 July 2017	(Thailand) Air Force Central	3 - 2	(Hong Kong) R&F	Thailand
17:00 (UTC+7)

3 August 2017	(Thailand) Super Power Samut Prakan	1 - 1	(Hong Kong) R&F	Thailand
	Perović

19 August 2017	R&F (Hong Kong)	0 - 1	Biu Chun Rangers	Guangzhou, Guangdong
			Krasić	Stadium: Guangzhou Higher Education Mega Center Central Stadium Training Ground

3 September 2017	(China) Guangzhou R&F	4 - 2	R&F (Hong Kong)	Guangzhou, Guangdong
	Ye Chugui ?'; Mai Jiajian ?'; Tang Miao ?'; Ottesen ?'		Bruninho ?', ?'	Stadium: Yuexiushan Stadium; Referee: Katsuhito Kinoshi; Assistant referees: Li Zhihai, Piao Jun

== Competitions ==
Win Draw Loss

=== Hong Kong Premier League ===
==== Table ====
Pos	Team	Pld	W	D	L	GF	GA	GD	Pts
6	Yuen Long	18	6	5	7	21	30	−9	23
7	(China) R&F	18	7	1	10	27	35	−8	22
8	Lee Man	18	4	3	11	22	36	−14	15

Updated to match(es) played on 13 May 2018. Source: Hong Kong Football Association
Rules for classification: 1) Points; 2) Head-to-head points; 3) Head-to-head goal difference; 4) Head-to-head goals scored; 5) Goal difference; 6) Goals scored; 7) Fair-play points; 8) Drawing lots (Play-off if the winner has to be decided)

==== Results by round ====
Round	1	2	3	4	5	6	7	8	9	10	11	12	13	14	15	16	17	18
Ground	A	A	A	H														
Result		L	L															
Position	6	7	8															

Updated to match(es) played on 16 September 2017. Source: Competitive Matches
A = Away; H = Home; W = Win; D = Draw; L = Loss

==== Results summary ====
Overall								Home						Away					
Pld	W	D	L	GF	GA	GD	Pts	W	D	L	GF	GA	GD	W	D	L	GF	GA	GD
4	2	0	2	7	8	−1	6	1	0	0	2	1	+1	1	0	2	5	7	−2

Last updated: 5 November 2017.
Source: Competitive Matches

==== League Matches ====
9 September 2017 2	Hong Kong Pegasus	3 - 2	R&F (Hong Kong)	So Kon Po, Hong Kong Island
17:30 (UTC+8)	Awal 43'; Leong Ka Hang 63', 73'; Wong Chun Ho (yellow card) 90+4'	Report	Marko Perović 22'; Yang Ziyi 88'	Stadium: Hong Kong Stadium; Attendance: 545; Referee: Tam Ping Wun; Assistant referees: Lam Nai Kei, So Kai Man; Fourth official: Luk Kin Sun

16 September 2017 3	Kwoon Chung Southern	3 - 1	R&F (Hong Kong)	Aberdeen, Hong Kong Island
14:30 (UTC+8)	Wellingsson 20', 32'; Marcos (yellow card) 36'; Marcos 90+4'	Report	Hou Junjie (red card) 38'; Núñez (yellow card) 50'; Li Rui 90+3'	Stadium: Aberdeen Sports Ground; Attendance: 379; Referee: Ng Chiu Kok; Assistant referees: Fok Pong Shing, Ng Wai Hong; Fourth official: Tong Kui Sum

15 October 2017 5	Biu Chun Rangers	Postponed	R&F (Hong Kong)	Sham Shui Po, Kowloon
14:30 (UTC+8)		Report		Stadium: Sham Shui Po Sports Ground

28 October 2017 1	Sun Bus Yuen Long	1 - 2	R&F (Hong Kong)	Yuen Long, New Territories
20:00 (UTC+8)	Lau Ka Ming 14'; Juninho (yellow card) 25' (red card) 76'; Tomas (yellow card) 30'; Law Chun Ting (yellow card) 81'; Lau Ka Ming (yellow card) 90+3'	Report	Roberto Júnior (yellow card) 20'; Li Rui 28', 63'; Yang Ziyi (yellow card) 87'	Stadium: Yuen Long Stadium; Attendance: 631; Referee: Chan Ming Siu; Assistant referees: Wong Ping Chung, Wong Kei Hoi; Fourth official: Ip Chi Wing

5 November 2017 6	R&F (Hong Kong)	2 - 1	Dreams FC	Guangzhou, Guangdong
14:30 (UTC+8)	Chen Fuhai 26'; Itaparica (yellow card) 30'; Chen Fuhai (yellow card) 30'; Roberto (yellow card) 57'; Giovane 60'; Tsang Kin Fong (yellow card) 66'; Liang Yongfeng (yellow card) 84'; Bruninho (yellow card) 90+4'	Report	Nacho Martínez (yellow card) 30'; Lui Man Tik 55'	Stadium: Yanzigang Stadium; Attendance: 868; Referee: Luk Kin Sun; Assistant referees: Fok Pong Shing, So Kai Man; Fourth official: Law Bik Chi

18 November 2017 7	R&F (Hong Kong)	1 - 0	Lee Man Warriors	Guangzhou, Guangdong
14:30 (UTC+8)	Hou Junjie (yellow card) 50'; Li Rui 77'; Bruninho (yellow card) 90+3'	Report	Zé Victor (yellow card) 18'; Yu Pui Hong (yellow card) 50'	Stadium: Yanzigang Stadium; Attendance: 821

25 November 2017 4	R&F (Hong Kong)	v	Kitchee	Guangzhou, Guangdong
14:30 (UTC+8)		Report		Stadium: Yanzigang Stadium

=== Hong Kong FA Cup ===
30 December 2017 First round	R&F (Hong Kong)	0 - 4	Sun Bus Yuen Long	Yuen Long, New Territories
14:30 (UTC+8)		Report	Juninho 42'; Everton Camargo 45'; Ticão 55'; Yiu Ho Ming 63'	Stadium: Yuen Long Stadium; Attendance: 668

=== Hong Kong Senior Challenge Shield ===
24 September 2017 First round	R&F (Hong Kong)	1 - 2	Lee Man Warriors	Tsing Yi, New Territories
17:30 (UTC+8)	Tsang Kin Fong (yellow card) 38'; Deng Yanlin (yellow card) 64'; Roberto Júnior 68'; Núñez (yellow card) 74'	Report	Victor 15'; Luciano 53'; Wong Chun Hin (yellow card) 86'	Stadium: Tsing Yi Sports Ground; Attendance: 346; Referee: Chan Ming Siu; Assistant referees: Lam Nai Kei, Leung Chung Yin; Fourth official: Ho Wai Sing

== Statistics ==
=== Appearances and goals ===
No.	Pos.	Player	Premier League			Senior Shield			FA Cup			Sapling Cup			Total		
No.	Pos.	Player	Apps.	Starts	Goals	Apps.	Starts	Goals	Apps.	Starts	Goals	Apps.	Starts	Goals	Apps.	Starts	Goals
1	GK	(China) Pei Chensong	2	2	0	0	0	0	0	0	0	0	0	0	2	2	0
4	DF	(China) Zhao Ming	3	2	0	1	1	0	0	0	0	0	0	0	4	3	0
5	DF	(Hong Kong) Vas Núñez	3	3	0	1	1	0	0	0	0	0	0	0	4	4	0
6	MF	(China) Hou Junjie	2	2	0	0	0	0	0	0	0	0	0	0	2	2	0
7	MF	(China) Deng Yanlin	2	1	0	1	1	0	0	0	0	0	0	0	3	2	0
9	FW	(Brazil) Bruninho	3	2	0	1	1	0	0	0	0	0	0	0	4	3	0
10	MF	(Hong Kong) Itaparica	3	3	0	1	1	0	0	0	0	0	0	0	4	4	0
11	FW	(Serbia) Marko Perović	2	2	1	0	0	0	0	0	0	0	0	0	2	2	1
12	GK	(China) Zhou Yuchen	2	2	0	1	1	0	0	0	0	0	0	0	3	3	0
13	MF	(China) Chen Fuhai	4	4	1	1	1	0	0	0	0	0	0	0	5	5	1
14	MF	(China) Zhang Jiajie	3	3	0	1	1	0	0	0	0	0	0	0	4	4	0
15	DF	(Hong Kong) Roberto	4	4	0	1	1	1	0	0	0	0	0	0	5	5	1
17	MF	(China) Yang Ziyi	4	2	1	1	1	0	0	0	0	0	0	0	5	3	1
18	DF	(China) Liang Yongfeng	4	4	0	1	1	0	0	0	0	0	0	0	5	5	0
19	FW	(China) Tsang Kin Fong	2	1	0	1	1	0	0	0	0	0	0	0	3	2	0
21	DF	(China) Liang Zhanhao	1	1	0	0	0	0	0	0	0	0	0	0	1	1	0
22	FW	(Brazil) Giovane	4	2	1	1	1	0	0	0	0	0	0	0	5	3	1
27	DF	(China) Zhong Ke	2	1	0	0	0	0	0	0	0	0	0	0	2	1	0
28	MF	(Hong Kong) Chow Cheuk Fung	1	1	0	0	0	0	0	0	0	0	0	0	1	1	0
77	FW	(China) Li Rui	3	2	3	1	1	0	0	0	0	0	0	0	4	3	3
TOTALS					7			1			0			0			8

=== Goalscorers ===
Rank	Player	No.	Pos.	Premier League	Senior Shield	FA Cup	Sapling Cup	Total
1	(China) Li Rui	77	FW	3	0	0	0	3
2	(Serbia) Marko Perović	11	FW	1	0	0	0	1
2	(China) Chen Fuhai	13	MF	1	0	0	0	1
2	(Hong Kong) Roberto	15	DF	0	1	0	0	1
2	(China) Yang Ziyi	17	MF	1	0	0	0	1
2	(Brazil) Giovane	22	FW	1	0	0	0	1
TOTALS				7	1	0	0	8
