= List of Hong Kong football transfers summer 2018 =

This is a list of Hong Kong football transfers for the 2018 summer transfer window. Only moves featuring at least one Premier League club are listed.

The summer transfer window was open from 11 July 2018 to 2 October 2018.

== Dreams ==
In:

No.	Pos.	Nation	Player
6	MF	HKG	Shu Kitamura (from Eastern)
7	MF	HKG	Leung Tsz Chun (from Southern)
8	MF	ESP	Gondra (from (Norway) FK Gjøvik-Lyn)
11	FW	BRA	Diego Higino (free agent)
12	FW	HKG	Chow Chi Yan (from Rangers)
13	MF	HKG	Tse Man Wing (from Eastern)
23	MF	HKG	Wong Chun Hin (from Yuen Long)
24	MF	HKG	Peng Lin Lin (from Leaper St. Joseph's)
26	MF	HKG	Man Wai Fung (from Leaper St. Joseph's)
27	MF	HKG	Jordan Lam (from Hong Kong Pegasus)
29	FW	HKG	Tang Tsz Kwan (from Leaper St. Joseph's)
30	GK	HKG	Leung Man Lai (from Mutual)
84	MF	HKG	Pang Chiu Yin (from Yuen Long)
93	MF	HKG	Chan Ho Chun (from Resources Capital)

Out:

No.	Pos.	Nation	Player
8	MF	ESP	José Galán (to (Qatar) Al-Shamal)
11	FW	HKG	Harima Hirokane (loan return to Kitchee)
12	MF	HKG	Li Ka Chun (to Eastern District)
14	FW	ESP	Arkaitz Ruiz (Free agent)
19	MF	HKG	Liu Pui Fung (to Pegasus)
20	DF	HKG	Wong Yiu Fu (to Hoi King)
21	MF	HKG	Lau Tak Yan (to Hoi King)
22	DF	HKG	Leung Ka Hai (to Eastern District)
25	MF	HKG	Lam Wan Kit (to Central & Western District)
31	DF	HKG	Law Tsz Chun (loan return to Kitchee)
89	MF	HKG	Au Yeung Yiu Chung (to Tai Po)

== Eastern ==
In:

No.	Pos.	Nation	Player
4	DF	ESP	José Ángel (from (Spain) Mallorca)
6	MF	HKG	Lau Ho Lam (from Yuen Long)
8	MF	BRA	Robson (loan from (Portugal) Cova da Piedade)
10	MF	HKG	Lam Ka Wai (from Kitchee)
11	FW	BRA	Everton Camargo (from Yuen Long)
19	MF	HKG	Yiu Ho Ming (loan return from Yuen Long)
22	DF	HKG	Tse Long Hin (loan return from Lee Man)
26	GK	HKG	Liu Fu Yuen (from Wong Tai Sin)
34	MF	HKG	Chan Ching Him (from Southern)
—	MF	HKG	Wong Chun Hin (loan return from Lee Man)
—	MF	HKG	Chan Siu Kwan (loan return from Southern)

Out:

No.	Pos.	Nation	Player
4	MF	HKG	Bai He (to R&F (Hong Kong))
11	FW	BRA	Michel Lugo (to Tai Po)
13	DF	HKG	Tse Man Wing (to Dreams)
19	MF	HKG	Lo Kong Wai (to R&F (Hong Kong))
20	MF	BRA	Vítor Saba (loan return to (Netherlands) Fortuna Sittard)
24	MF	HKG	Ju Yingzhi (to Kitchee)
28	FW	BRA	Bruno (Free agent)
35	DF	HKG	Ng Wai Chiu (Retired)
80	FW	HKG	Yim Tsz Wai (loan to Sun Source)
88	MF	HKG	Kitamura Shu (to Dreams)
96	DF	HKG	Lee Ka Wah (loan to Hongda)
98	DF	HKG	Chu Chun Kiu (loan to Sun Source)
—	MF	HKG	Wong Chun Hin (loan to Lee Man)
—	MF	HKG	Chan Siu Kwan (to Tai Po)

== Hoi King ==
In:

No.	Pos.	Nation	Player
1	GK	BRA	Paulo César (loan from Kitchee)
2	DF	HKG	Wong Lok (from Rangers)
3	DF	HKG	Lo Tsz Hin (from Happy Valley)
6	MF	HKG	Au Man Lok
7	FW	HKG	Chan Wai Lok
8	MF	HKG	Ko Chun (from South China)
10	FW	HKG	Christian Annan (loan from Kitchee)
11	FW	HKG	Hirokane Harima (loan from Kitchee)
12	DF	HKG	Lew Wai Yip
15	MF	HKG	Lee Kai Chi (from Lee Man)
19	GK	HKG	Felix Luk (from Lee Man)
20	FW	HKG	Liu Kin Po
21	MF	HKG	Lau Tak Yan (from Dreams)
22	MF	HKG	Wong Tsz Chun
25	GK	HKG	Tung Ho Yin
35	MF	PHI	Mark Swainston (loan from Kitchee)
44	MF	HKG	Ho Chun Ting
67	FW	HKG	Seb Buddle (loan from Kitchee)
81	FW	HKG	Chan Man Chun
99	DF	HKG	Wong Yiu Fu (from Dreams)

Out:

No.	Pos.	Nation	Player

== Hong Kong Pegasus ==
In:

No.	Pos.	Nation	Player
9	FW	HKG	Lau Chi Lok (from Rangers)
11	MF	JPN	Shu Sasaki (from Rangers)
14	DF	HKG	Jack Sealy (from Tai Po)
17	DF	HKG	Cheung Kwok Ming (from Rangers)
20	FW	BRA	Juninho (from Yuen Long)
29	MF	HKG	Liu Pui Fung (from Dreams)
66	GK	HKG	Zhang Chunhui (from Eastern District)
—	DF	HKG	Yeung Chi Lun (loan return from Rangers)

Out:

No.	Pos.	Nation	Player
5	DF	HKG	Jean-Jacques Kilama (to Tai Po)
9	FW	MAC	Leong Ka Hang (to Lee Man)
14	FW	HKG	Fong Pak Lun (to Lee Man)
15	DF	HKG	Leung Nok Hang (to R&F (Hong Kong))
20	FW	HKG	Chung Wai Keung (to Tai Po)
27	MF	HKG	Jordan Lam (to Dreams)
44	GK	HKG	Ko Chun (to Lee Man)
88	GK	HKG	Yuen Ho Chun (to Lee Man)
—	DF	HKG	Yeung Chi Lun (to Tai Po)

== Kitchee ==
In:

No.	Pos.	Nation	Player
10	MF	BRA	Robert (from (Brazil) Fluminense)
11	FW	CRO	Josip Tadić (from (Lithuania) Sūduva Marijampolė)
17	GK	HKG	Wong Tsz Chung
20	MF	CAN	Matt Lam (loan return from Lee Man)
22	MF	MLI	Mohamed Sissoko (from (Mexico) Atlético San Luis)
24	MF	HKG	Ju Yingzhi (from Eastern)
27	FW	HKG	Yu Yang Bosley (from Southern)
31	DF	HKG	Law Tsz Chun (loan return from Dreams)
44	FW	JPN	Yuto Nakamura (from Tai Po)
—	GK	HKG	Chan Ka Ho (loan return from Yuen Long)
—	GK	BRA	Paulo César (from Wing Yee)
—	MF	HKG	Ngan Lok Fung (loan return from Lee Man)
—	MF	HKG	Emmet Wan (loan return from Lee Man)
—	FW	HKG	Hirokane Harima (loan return from Dreams)

Out:

No.	Pos.	Nation	Player
6	MF	GER	Zhi-Gin Lam (to R&F (Hong Kong))
8	FW	HKG	Alex Akande (to (China) Yanbian Funde)
10	MF	HKG	Lam Ka Wai (to Eastern)
12	DF	HKG	Lo Kwan Yee (to R&F (Hong Kong))
17	FW	HKG	Paulinho (to R&F (Hong Kong))
18	FW	URU	Diego Forlán (Free agent)
32	MF	HUN	Krisztián Vadócz (to (Hungary) Budapest Honvéd)
35	MF	PHI	Mark Swainston (loan to Hoi King)
67	FW	HKG	Seb Buddle (loan to Hoi King)
—	GK	HKG	Chan Ka Ho (loan to Yuen Long)
—	GK	BRA	Paulo César (loan to Hoi King)
—	MF	HKG	Ngan Lok Fung (to Lee Man)
—	MF	HKG	Emmet Wan (to Southern)
—	FW	HKG	Hirokane Harima (loan to Hoi King)

== Lee Man ==
In:

No.	Pos.	Nation	Player
5	DF	ESP	Fran González (from (Poland) Bytovia Bytów)
6	FW	HKG	Yu Wai Lim (from Yuen Long)
8	MF	HKG	Tam Lok Hin (from Yuen Long)
9	MF	NED	Crescendo van Berkel (from (Norway) Sandefjord)
10	MF	BRA	Alexandre Talento (from (Greece) Kallithea)
11	MF	HKG	Cheng Siu Kwan (from Rangers)
12	MF	HKG	Lai Yiu Cheong (loan return from Yuen Long)
20	MF	KOR	Baek Ji-hoon (Free agent)
27	DF	HKG	Chan Hin Kwong (from Yuen Long)

Out:

No.	Pos.	Nation	Player
5	DF	PRK	Son Min-chol (Retired)
6	MF	HKG	Emmet Wan (loan return to Kitchee)
14	FW	BRA	Denis (Free agent)
15	MF	HKG	Wong Chun Hin (loan return to Eastern)
19	GK	HKG	Felix Luk (to Hoi King)
22	MF	HKG	Tse Long Hin (loan return to Eastern)
24	DF	HKG	Lee Kai Chi (to Hoi King)
29	MF	CAN	Matt Lam (loan return to Kitchee)
35	DF	HKG	Marco Wegener (to Hoi King)
38	DF	HKG	Chiu Chun Kit (Free agent)
87	DF	BRA	Luciano Silva (Free agent)

== Southern ==
In:

No.	Pos.	Nation	Player
5	MF	SRB	Marko Krasić (from Rangers)
7	MF	BRA	Ticão (from Yuen Long)
9	FW	SRB	Nikola Komazec (from (Indonesia) Bhayangkara)
16	MF	HKG	Emmet Wan (to Southern)
19	FW	BRA	Dhiego Martins (from Tai Po)
23	DF	HKG	Lau Ka Ming (from Yuen Long)

Out:

No.	Pos.	Nation	Player
5	DF	ESP	Diego Garrido (to (Spain) Racing de Ferrol)
7	MF	HKG	Leung Tsz Chun (to Dreams)
9	FW	BRA	Elias (Free agent)
13	DF	HKG	Lam Ho Kwan (Retired)
15	MF	ESP	Carles Martínez (to (Spain) Barakaldo)
16	MF	HKG	Chan Siu Kwan (loan return to Eastern)
21	FW	ESP	Marcos (to (Spain) Atlético Baleares)
22	MF	HKG	Chan Ching Him (to Eastern)
25	FW	HKG	Paul Ngue (to (China) Xinjiang Tianshan Leopard)
27	FW	HKG	Yu Yang Bosley (to Kitchee)

== R&F (Hong Kong) ==
In:

No.	Pos.	Nation	Player
3	DF	HKG	Lin Junsheng
4	MF	HKG	Bai He (from Eastern)
6	MF	GER	Zhi-Gin Lam (from Kitchee)
11	MF	HKG	Lo Kong Wai (from Eastern)
12	DF	HKG	Lo Kwan Yee (from Kitchee)
13	GK	CHN	Zhou Yuchen (loan from (China) Shandong Luneng)
14	MF	CHN	Ning An (loan from (China) Guangzhou R&F)
16	MF	HKG	Tan Chun Lok (loan from (China) Guangzhou R&F)
17	FW	HKG	Paulinho (from Kitchee)
24	DF	HKG	Leung Nok Hang (from Hong Kong Pegasus)
30	MF	IRL	Sean Tse (from Tai Po)
32	FW	HKG	Yuen Chun Sing (from Tai Po)
97	MF	CHN	Chen Fuhai (loan from (China) Guangzhou R&F)
98	GK	CHN	Chen Zirong (loan from (China) Guangzhou R&F)
—	DF	CRO	Saša Novaković (from (Bosnia and Herzegovina) FK Sarajevo)

Out:

No.	Pos.	Nation	Player
4	DF	CHN	Zhao Ming (Free agent)
7	MF	CHN	Deng Yanlin (loan return to (China) Guangzhou R&F)
9	FW	BRA	Bruninho (loan return to (China) Guangzhou R&F)
12	GK	CHN	Zhou Yuchen (loan return to (China) Shandong Luneng)
13	MF	CHN	Chen Fuhai (loan return to (China) Guangzhou R&F)
14	MF	CHN	Zhang Jiajie (loan return to (China) Guangzhou R&F)
17	MF	CHN	Yang Ziyi (Free agent)
18	DF	CHN	Liang Yongfeng (loan return to (China) Guangzhou R&F)
19	FW	HKG	Tsang Kin Fong (to (Sweden) Råslätts SK)
23	MF	CHN	He Zilin (loan return to (China) Guangzhou R&F)
27	DF	CHN	Zhong Ke (to (China) Meixian Techand)
28	MF	HKG	Chow Cheuk Fung (to Rangers)
29	FW	CHN	Liang Zheyu (Free agent)
42	MF	HKG	Ng Man Hin (Free agent)
44	DF	HKG	Hung Lau (Free agent)
77	FW	CHN	Li Rui (loan return to (China) Guangzhou R&F)
98	GK	CHN	Chen Zirong (loan return to (China) Guangzhou R&F)
99	DF	CHN	Wang Erduo (loan return to (China) Guangzhou R&F)

== Tai Po ==
In:

No.	Pos.	Nation	Player
16	MF	HKG	Chan Siu Kwan (from Eastern)
89	MF	HKG	Au Yeung Yiu Chung (from Dreams)

Out:

No.	Pos.	Nation	Player
9	FW	HKG	Yuen Chun Sing (to R&F (Hong Kong))
10	MF	HKG	Lui Chi Hing (Retired)
11	FW	BRA	Dhiego Martins (to Southern)
14	DF	HKG	Jack Sealy (to Hong Kong Pegasus)
16	MF	HKG	Tan Chun Lok (to (China) Guangzhou R&F)
22	MF	IRL	Sean Tse (to R&F (Hong Kong))
44	FW	JPN	Yuto Nakamura (to Kitchee)

== Yuen Long ==
In:

No.	Pos.	Nation	Player

Out:

No.	Pos.	Nation	Player
5	FW	HKG	Yu Wai Lim (to Lee Man)
7	MF	BRA	Ticão (to Southern)
8	MF	HKG	Lau Ho Lam (to Eastern)
10	FW	BRA	Everton Camargo (to Eastern)
12	MF	HKG	Lai Yiu Cheong (loan return to Lee Man)
19	MF	HKG	Yiu Ho Ming (loan return to Eastern)
26	GK	HKG	Chan Ka Ho (loan return to Kitchee)
27	DF	HKG	Chan Hin Kwong (to Lee Man)
29	DF	HKG	Lau Ka Ming (to Southern)
33	MF	HKG	Tam Lok Hin (to Lee Man)
84	DF	HKG	Pang Chiu Yin (to Dreams)
89	MF	HKG	Ip Chung Long (Retired)
