= 2019–20 R&F (Hong Kong) season =

R&F 2019–20 season
- President: Huang Shenghua
- Head coach: Yeung Ching Kwong
- Stadium: Yanzigang Stadium
- Premier League: 3rd
- Senior Shield: Semi-finals
- FA Cup: Runner-up
- Sapling Cup: Group Stage
- Highest home attendance: 1,026 (vs Kitchee, 19 October 2019)
- Lowest home attendance: 537 (vs Rangers, 24 November 2019)
Home colours	Away colours

The 2019–20 season is R&F's 4th season in the top-tier division in Hong Kong football. R&F will compete in the Premier League, Senior Challenge Shield, FA Cup and Sapling Cup this season.

== Squad ==
=== First Team ===
As of 12 September 2020

Note: Flags indicate national team as defined under FIFA eligibility rules; some limited exceptions apply. Players may hold more than one non-FIFA nationality.

No.	Pos.	Nation	Player
1	GK	CHN	Zhou Yuchen ^{FP} (on loan from Shandong Luneng)
2	DF	HKG	Tsui Wang Kit
5	DF	HKG	Vas Nuñez
7	MF	GER	Zhi-Gin Lam ^{LP}
8	MF	CIV	Serges Déblé ^{FP}
11	DF	HKG	Lo Kong Wai
12	DF	HKG	Lo Kwan Yee
14	DF	HKG	Fong Pak Lun
15	DF	HKG	Roberto (Captain)
16	DF	HKG	Lam Hin Ting
17	MF	BFA	Adama Guira ^{FP}
18	FW	BRA	Igor Sartori ^{FP}
20	MF	CAN	Matt Lam ^{LP}

No.	Pos.	Nation	Player
22	FW	HKG	Giovane
23	MF	AUS	Jared Lum ^{LP}
27	MF	HKG	Jordan Lam
30	MF	HKG	Sean Tse
32	FW	HKG	Yuen Chun Sing
33	DF	BRA	Dudu ^{FP}
44	DF	HKG	Fung Hing Wa
77	FW	HKG	Mak Fu Shing
94	GK	HKG	Tse Ka Wing
97	GK	HKG	Wong Tsz Hong
99	FW	HKG	Adriel Chan
–	GK	HKG	Yip Ka Yu

Remarks:
^{LP} These players are considered as local players in Hong Kong domestic football competitions.
^{FP} These players are registered as foreign players.

== Transfers ==
=== Transfers in ===
Date from	Position	Nationality	Name	From	Fee	Ref.
21 May 2019	FW	(Hong Kong)	Adriel Demian Chan	Central & Western	Free	
10 June 2019	FW	(Brazil)	Igor Sartori	Tai Po	Free	
2 July 2019	MF	(Burkina Faso)	Adama Guira	(Denmark) AGF Aarhus	Free	
4 July 2019	DF	(Republic of the Congo)	Emmersón	(Denmark) Vejle Boldklub	Free	
9 July 2019	GK	(Hong Kong)	Tse Ka Wing	Dreams FC	Free	
9 July 2019	MF	(Hong Kong)	Jordan Lam	Dreams FC	Free	
11 July 2019	DF	(Hong Kong)	Fong Pak Lun	Lee Man	Free	
25 July 2019	DF	(Hong Kong)	Lam Hin Ting	Dreams FC	Free	
25 July 2019	MF	(Canada) (Hong Kong)	Matt Lam	Kitchee	Free	
16 August 2019	DF	(Hong Kong)	Tse Wai Chun	Yuen Long	Free	
October 2019	GK	(Hong Kong)	Au Ching Lok	(United States) Naples United	Free	
October 2019	GK	(Hong Kong)	Wong Tsz Hong	North District	Free	
13 January 2020	MF	(Hong Kong)	Lam Ka Wai	Eastern	Free	
20 February 2020	FW	(Ecuador)	Daniel Angulo	(Ecuador) C.S. Emelec	Free	
June 2020	DF	(Hong Kong)	Tsui Wang Kit	(China) Meizhou Hakka	Swap with Leung Nok Hang	
1 July 2020	DF	(Brazil)	Dudu	Tai Po	Free	
1 July 2020	MF	(Australia) (Hong Kong)	Jared Lum	Kitchee	Free	
2 July 2020	GK	(Hong Kong)	Yip Ka Yu	Yuen Long	Free	
11 July 2020	DF	(Hong Kong)	Fung Hing Wa	Eastern	Free	
12 September 2020	MF	(Hong Kong)	Lo Kong Wai		Free	
12 September 2020	MF	(Hong Kong)	Mak Fu Shing		Free	

=== Transfers out ===
Date from	Position	Nationality	Name	To	Fee	Ref.
1 July 2019	DF	(Hong Kong)	Lin Junsheng		Released	
1 July 2019	DF	(Croatia)	Saša Novaković		Released	
1 July 2019	DF	(Hong Kong)	Li Cheuk Hon	(United States) Campbellsville University	Released	
1 July 2019	MF	(Hong Kong)	Itaparica	Retired	Released	
1 July 2019	MF	(Hong Kong)	Paulinho		Released	
1 July 2019	MF	(Hong Kong)	Tsang Tung Ming		Released	
1 July 2019	MF	(Hong Kong)	Tan Chun Lok	(China) Guangzhou R&F	End of loan	
1 July 2019	FW	(Hong Kong)	Godfred Karikari		Released	
1 July 2019	DF	(China)	Hou Junjie	(China) Guangzhou R&F	End of loan	
1 July 2019	DF	(China)	Liang Yongfeng	(China) Guangzhou R&F	End of loan	
1 July 2019	MF	(China)	Wu Weian	Team manager	Released	
1 July 2019	MF	(China)	Ning An	(China) Guangzhou R&F	End of loan	
1 July 2019	MF	(China)	Wang Xinhui	Assistant coach	Released	
1 July 2019	MF	(China)	Chen Fuhai	(China) Guangzhou R&F	End of loan	
January 2020	GK	(China)	Chen Zirong	(China) Guangzhou R&F	End of loan	
1 June 2020	GK	(Hong Kong)	Au Ching Lok		Released	
1 June 2020	MF	(Hong Kong)	Lam Ka Wai	Rangers	Released	
1 June 2020	MF	(Hong Kong)	Lo Kong Wai		Released	
1 June 2020	MF	(Hong Kong)	Mak Fu Shing		Released	
1 June 2020	MF	(Hong Kong)	Bai He	Retired	Released	
1 June 2020	FW	(Ecuador)	Daniel Angulo	(Ecuador) Orense	Released	
31 August 2020	DF	(Hong Kong)	Leung Nok Hang	(China) Meizhou Hakka	Swap with Tsui Wang Kit	
September 2020	FW	(Brazil)	Tiago Leonço	(China) Beijing Renhe	Released	

=== Loans in ===
Start Date	End Date	Position	Nationality	Name	From Club	Fee	Ref.
1 July 2019	End of season	GK	(China)	Zhou Yuchen	(China) Shandong Luneng	Undisclosed	
February 2020	31 May 2020	DF	(China)	Fu Yunlong	(China) Guangzhou R&F	Undisclosed	

=== Loans out ===
Start Date	End Date	Position	Nationality	Name	To Club	Fee	Ref.
16 August 2019	31 May 2020	DF	(Hong Kong)	Tse Wai Chun	Rangers	Undisclosed	
August 2019	31 May 2020	MF	(China)	Yu Zeping	North District	Undisclosed	
September 2019	February 2020	GK	(China)	Ji Xiangzheng	Rangers	Undisclosed	

== Team staff ==
Position	Staff
Head coach	(Hong Kong) Yeung Ching Kwong
Team manager	(China) Wu Weian
Fitness coach	(Croatia) Mirko Renic
Goalkeeping coach	(China) Li Wei
Assistant coach	(China) Wang Xinhui
Physiotherapist	(China) Liu Yihao
Team assistant	(China) Liu Zhixing
Team translator	(China) Luo Xi

== Competitions ==
=== Hong Kong Premier League ===
==== Table ====
Pos	Team	Pld	W	D	L	GF	GA	GD	Pts	Qualification or relegation
1	Kitchee (C)	10	6	2	2	25	10	+15	20	Qualification for AFC Champions League group stage
2	Eastern	10	6	1	3	16	8	+8	19	Qualification for AFC Cup group stage
3	(China) R&F (D)	10	5	3	2	21	15	+6	18	Withdrew from league system, club folded (Note: R&F withdrew from the league system after the end of the season and folded.)
4	Lee Man	10	5	1	4	16	14	+2	16	Qualification for AFC Cup group stage
5	Southern	10	2	4	4	15	21	−6	10	

Source: Hong Kong Football Association
Rules for classification: 1) Points; 2) Head-to-head points; 3) Head-to-head goal difference; 4) Head-to-head goals scored; 5) Goal difference; 6) Goals scored; 7) Fair-play points; 8) Drawing lots (Play-off if the winner has to be decided).
(C) Champions; (D) Disqualified
Notes:

Win Draw Loss

=== Hong Kong Sapling Cup ===
==== Group stage ====
Pos	Team	Pld	W	D	L	GF	GA	GD	Pts	Qualification
1	Southern (A)	8	4	3	1	8	5	+3	15	Advance to Final
2	(China) R&F	8	4	1	3	18	12	+6	13	
3	Yuen Long	8	3	3	2	19	17	+2	12	
4	Happy Valley	8	2	2	4	13	17	−4	8	
5	Tai Po	8	1	3	4	18	25	−7	6	

Source: Hong Kong Football Association
Rules for classification: 1) Points; 2) Head-to-head points; 3) Head-to-head goal difference; 4) Goal difference; 5) Goals scored.
(A) Advance to a further round
