= 2024 Shaanxi Union F.C. season =

Chinese football club season

Shaanxi Union
2024 season
- Owner: Qin Ying Sports
- Chairman: Huang Shenghua
- Manager: Óscar Céspedes
- Stadium: Shaanxi Province Stadium; Weinan Sports Center Stadium
- China League Two: 1st
Home colours	Away colours	Third colours

The 2024 season was the second season in the existence of Shaanxi Union Football Club, and their first ever season in China League Two, the Chinese third-tier, following promotion in the previous season. In addition to the domestic league, the club also participated in the Chinese FA Cup. On 26 January 2024, the club changed its name from Shaanxi Chang'an Union Football Club to Shaanxi Union Football Club. Shaanxi Union drew an average home attendance of 17,600 in 2024.

== First-team squad ==
As of 27 April 2024

Note: Flags indicate national team as has been defined under FIFA eligibility rules. Players may hold more than one non-FIFA nationality.

No.	Name	Position	Nationality	Place of birth	Date of birth (age)	Club apps	Club goals	Signed from	Date signed	Transfer fee	Contract end
Goalkeepers
25	Li Chen	GK	(China)	Huai'an	25 November 1996 (aged 27)	14	0	Shaanxi Chang'an Athletic	20 April 2023	Free	31 December 2025
28	Zhou Yuchen	GK	(China)	Weifang	12 January 1995 (aged 28)	3	0	Guangdong GZ-Power	4 January 2024	Free	31 December 2025
57	Bai Mingyu	GK	(China)	Xi'an	16 May 2003 (aged 20)	0	0	Wuhan Three Towns U19	22 August 2023	Free	31 December 2025
60	Li Tianle	GK	(China)	Yan'an	11 August 2004 (aged 19)	0	0	Nantong Zhiyun U19	23 February 2024	Free	31 December 2025
Defenders
4	Wang Weipu	CB	(China)	Shenyang	26 November 1993 (aged 30)	15	1	Wuxi Wugo	12 July 2023	Free	31 December 2025
5	Yao Diran	CB	(China)	Xi'an	23 April 1996 (aged 27)	6	0	Dandong Tengyue	1 January 2024	Free	31 December 2025
6	Ding Jie	CB	(China)	Dalian	29 April 1987 (aged 36)	20	5	Chongqing Liangjiang Athletic	20 April 2023	Free	31 December 2025
16	Ma Yangyang	RB	(China)	Taihe	20 February 1998 (aged 25)	11	3	Zibo Qisheng	20 April 2023	Free	31 December 2025
21	Zhao Shuhao	LB	(China)	Dancheng	18 January 1998 (aged 25)	18	0	Nantong Zhiyun	20 April 2023	Free	31 December 2025
26	Sun Xiaobin	CB	(China)	Lixin	16 February 1999 (aged 24)	15	1	Zibo Cuju	20 April 2023	Free	31 December 2025
29	Mi Haolun	LB	(China)	Xi'an	10 January 1993 (aged 30)	14	5	Shenzhen	3 August 2023	Free	31 December 2025
44	Yang Ruiqi	CB	(China)	Xi'an	8 February 2004 (aged 19)	3	0	Shandong Taishan U21	23 February 2024	Loan	31 December 2024
47	Nureli Tursunali	LB	(China)	Ürümqi	17 March 2005 (aged 18)	3	0	Free agent	17 August 2023	Free	31 December 2025
49	Elkut Eysajan	RB	(China)	Yining	29 July 2004 (aged 19)	6	1	Dalian Pro U21	23 February 2024	Free	31 December 2024
Midfielders
8	Xie Zhiwei	DM	(China)	Jiangyin	7 January 1998 (aged 25)	6	2	Nanjing City	2 January 2024	Free	31 December 2025
11	Wen Shuo	LM	(China)	Xi'an	5 January 1991 (aged 32)	9	3	Shaanxi Chang'an Athletic	20 April 2023	Free	31 December 2025
15	Wen Wubin	CM	(China)	Xiangyang	7 January 1997 (aged 26)	14	1	Nanjing City	12 July 2023	Free	31 December 2025
17	Wu Chengru	CM	(China)	Beijing	15 September 2000 (aged 23)	3	1	Guangdong GZ-Power	23 February 2024	Free	31 December 2025
19	Zhang Yuxuan	CM	(China)	Zhengzhou	24 January 1995 (aged 28)	19	4	Shaanxi Chang'an Athletic	20 April 2023	Free	31 December 2025
22	Chen Xing	DM	(China)	Guangzhou	29 March 2000 (aged 23)	11	0	Meizhou Hakka	20 April 2023	Free	31 December 2025
32	Xu Wu	LM	(China)	Tiantai	14 February 1991 (aged 32)	16	3	Shaanxi Chang'an Athletic	20 April 2023	Free	31 December 2025
38	Hu Mingtian	LM	(China)	Xuzhou	7 August 1994 (aged 29)	5	0	Chengdu Rongcheng	3 January 2024	Free	31 December 2025
45	Zhong Weihong	AM	(China)	Meizhou	14 November 2004 (aged 19)	5	0	Jinan Xingzhou	5 January 2024	Undisclosed	31 December 2025
Forwards
7	Ma Xiaolei	RW	(China)	Beijing	19 January 1987 (aged 36)	13	7	Chengdu Rongcheng	21 April 2023	Free	31 December 2025
9	Li Rui	ST	(China)	Huizhou	2 May 1994 (aged 29)	4	2	Guangxi Pingguo Haliao	23 February 2024	Free	31 December 2025
34	Pang Zhiquan	ST	(China)	Qingdao	16 August 1990 (aged 33)	17	13	Shaanxi Chang'an Athletic	20 April 2023	Free	31 December 2025

== Transfers ==
=== Transfers in ===
Date	Pos	Player	Transferred from	Fee	Ref
1 January 2024	CB	(China) Yao Diran	(China) Dandong Tengyue	Free transfer	
2 January 2024	DM	(China) Xie Zhiwei	(China) Nanjing City	Free transfer	
3 January 2024	LM	(China) Hu Mingtian	(China) Chengdu Rongcheng	Free transfer	
4 January 2024	GK	(China) Zhou Yuchen	(China) Guangdong GZ-Power	Free transfer	
5 January 2024	AM	(China) Zhong Weihong	(China) Jinan Xingzhou	Undisclosed	
23 February 2024	RB	(China) Elkut Eysajan	(China) Dalian Pro U21	Free transfer	
23 February 2024	ST	(China) Li Rui	(China) Guangxi Pingguo Haliao	Free transfer	
23 February 2024	GK	(China) Li Tianle	(China) Nantong Zhiyun U19	Free transfer	
23 February 2024	CM	(China) Wu Chengru	(China) Guangdong GZ-Power	Free transfer	

=== Transfers out ===
Date	Pos	Player	Transferred to	Fee	Ref
31 December 2023	RM	(China) Fu Jie	(China) Xi'an Chongde Ronghai	End of contract	
31 December 2023	ST	(China) He Shaolin	Free agent	End of contract	
31 December 2023	RM	(China) Huang Pu	Free agent	End of contract	
31 December 2023	CM	(China) Huang Zhaoyi	(China) Guangxi Bushan	End of contract	
31 December 2023	GK	(China) Jia Xinyao	(China) Xi'an Chongde Ronghai	End of contract	
31 December 2023	CM	(China) Liu Hao	Free agent	End of contract	
31 December 2023	RM	(China) Liu Tianyang	(China) Quanzhou Yassin	End of contract	
31 December 2023	LB	(China) Yalqunjan Mamut	Free agent	End of contract	
31 December 2023	RW	(China) Nan Yunqi	(China) Shijiazhuang Gongfu	End of contract	
31 December 2023	DM	(China) Su Shun	(China) Xi'an Chongde Ronghai	End of contract	
31 December 2023	CB	(China) Wang Zihao	Free agent	End of contract	
31 December 2023	ST	(China) Xi Zhenyun	(China) Guangxi Lanhang	End of contract	
31 December 2023	CB	(China) Xu Chen	Free agent	End of contract	
31 December 2023	DM	(China) Xu Zhaoji	(China) Hunan Billows	End of contract	
31 December 2023	RB	(China) Yang Peng	(China) Xi'an Chongde Ronghai	End of contract	
31 December 2023	CB	(China) Zhou Jiahao	Free agent	End of contract	

=== Loans in ===
Date	Pos	Player	Loaned from	Until	Ref
23 February 2024	CB	(China) Yang Ruiqi	(China) Shandong Taishan U21	End of season	

== Pre-season and friendlies ==
Between 22 November 2023 and 22 December 2023, the club announced two-year contract extensions for fourteen of their first-team players, including club captain Ding Jie, as well as a new two-year deal with an option to extend a further year for manager Óscar Céspedes.

Between 1 January and 5 January 2024, the club announced five signings, in Dandong Tengyue defender Yao Diran, Nanjing City midfielder Xie Zhiwei, Chengdu Rongcheng midfielder Hu Mingtian, and Guangzhou E-Power goalkeeper Zhou Yuchen on free contracts, and Jinan Xingzhou midfielder Zhong Weihong for an undisclosed fee.

On 8 January 2024, the first-team headed out to Guangzhou for a month in winter pre-season. On 27 January 2024, Shaanxi Union faced off in a friendly against Chinese Super League opposition Cangzhou Mighty Lions, in a match where Shaanxi Union were victorious. On 16 February, the club announced a friendly against China League One opposition Shanghai Jiading Huilong to be played on 25 February.

Win Draw Loss Fixtures

20 January 2024 Friendly	Shaanxi Chang'an Union	1–3	Shenzhen Juniors	Foshan
10:30 UTC+8				Stadium: Foshan Sanshui Westin Football Base

27 January 2024 Friendly	Shaanxi Union	2–0	Cangzhou Mighty Lions	Guangzhou
10:30 UTC+8	Xie Zhiwei 53'; Zhong Weihong 67'	Report

31 January 2024 Friendly	Shaanxi Union	2–0	Shenzhen U-19	Shenzhen
	Zhong Weihong; Pang Zhiquan 65'	Report

3 February 2024 Friendly	Shaanxi Union	1–1	Guizhou Zhucheng Athletic
	Ma Yangyang

6 February 2024 Friendly	Yunnan Yukun	2–0	Shaanxi Union

25 February 2024 Friendly	Shaanxi Union	0–1	Shanghai Jiading Huilong	Weinan
14:00 UTC+8			38' Shi Jian	Stadium: Weinan Sports Center Stadium

2 March 2024 Friendly	Chongqing Tonglianglong	2–0	Shaanxi Union	Chongqing
15:00 UTC+8	Sun Xipeng 44'; Gong Yunyang 59'			Stadium: Tongliang Long Stadium

9 March 2024 Friendly	Shaanxi Union	3–0	Shaanxi National Power	Xi'an
19:30 UTC+8	Xie Zhiwei 18'; Yang Ruiqi 40'; Zhang Yuxuan 84'			Stadium: Shaanxi Province Stadium

16 March 2024 Friendly	Henan	3–1	Shaanxi Union	Zhengzhou
15:00 UTC+8	Huang Zichang 13'; Zhang Zhihao 16'; Čović (pen.)		18' (pen.) Li Rui	Stadium: Hanghai Stadium

== Competitions ==
=== Overall record ===
Competition	First match	Last match	Starting round	Record							
Competition	First match	Last match	Starting round	Pld	W	D	L	GF	GA	GD	Win %
China League Two	23 March 2024	TBD	Matchday 1	6	4	2	0	16	3	+13	66.67
Chinese FA Cup	20 April 2024	TBD	Second round	1	1	0	0	5	0	+5	100.00
Total				7	5	2	0	21	3	+18	71.43

Last updated: 27 April 2024
Source: Soccerway

=== China League Two ===
==== League table ====
North Group

Pos	Team	Pld	W	D	L	GF	GA	GD	Pts	Qualification
1	Shaanxi Union	18	11	3	4	36	17	+19	36	Qualification for Promotion stage
2	Nantong Haimen Codion	18	10	5	3	27	18	+9	35	Qualification for Promotion stage
3	Dalian K'un City	18	9	4	5	25	15	+10	31	Qualification for Promotion stage
4	Langfang Glory City	18	9	3	6	24	17	+7	30	Qualification for Promotion stage
5	Shandong Taishan B	18	8	5	5	20	14	+6	29	Qualification for Promotion stage

Source: Soccerway
Rules for classification:
- During season: 1) Points; 2) Head-to-head points; 3) Head-to-head goal difference; 4) Head-to-head goals scored; 5) Goal difference; 6) Goals scored; 7) Rankings in the previous season. (Rules 2 to 4 are only applied when teams concerned have finished both/all the matches against others.)
- After season: 1) Points; 2) Head-to-head points; 3) Head-to-head goal difference; 4) Head-to-head goals scored; 5) Goal difference; 6) Goals scored; 7) Disciplinary points (yellow card = 1 point, red card = 3 points); 8) Drawing of lots.

==== Results summary ====
Overall								Home						Away					
Pld	W	D	L	GF	GA	GD	Pts	W	D	L	GF	GA	GD	W	D	L	GF	GA	GD
6	4	2	0	16	3	+13	14	1	2	0	7	3	+4	3	0	0	9	0	+9

Last updated: 27 April 2024.
Source: Soccerway

==== Results by matchday ====
North Group

Matchday	1	2	3	4	5	6	7	8	9	10	11	12	13	14	15	16	17	18
Ground	A	A	H	H	A	H	A	A	H	H	H	A	A	H	A	H	H	A
Result	W	W	D	D	W	W	L											
Position	2	1	1	2	1	1	1											

A = Away; H = Home; N = Neutral; W = Win; D = Draw; L = Loss; P = Postponed

Promotion/relegation stage

Matchday	19	20	21	22	23	24	25	26	27	28
Ground										
Result										
Position										

A = Away; H = Home; N = Neutral; W = Win; D = Draw; L = Loss; P = Postponed

==== Matches ====
The fixtures for the first stage of China League Two were announced on 16 March 2024, with Shaanxi Union's home matches being played at Shaanxi Province Stadium in Xi'an, except for one match on 2 June, to be played at the Weinan Sports Center Stadium in Weinan, Shaanxi. On 24 April, Shaanxi Union's remaining home matches were moved to be played at Weinan Sports Center Stadium.

Win Draw Loss Fixtures

23 March 2024 1	Hubei Istar	0–2	Shaanxi Union	Wuhan
15:30 UTC+8	Huang Kaijun (yellow card) 52'; Li Dongnan (yellow card) 88'	Report	(yellow card) 10' Xie Zhiwei; (yellow card) 24' Wu Chengru; 41', (yellow card) 68' Mi Haolun; 44' Elkut; (yellow card) 68' Wang Weipu	Stadium: Xinhua Road Sports Center; Attendance: 1,218; Referee: Li Wei

30 March 2024 2	Xi'an Chongde Ronghai	0–5	Shaanxi Union	Xi'an
15:30 UTC+8	Li Tongrui (yellow card) 27'; Yang Peng (yellow card) 58'; Ye Qian (yellow card) 90+6'	Report	27' Xie Zhiwei; 30' Wu Chengru; 41' Zhang Yuxuan; 70' Li Rui; 88' Xu Wu	Stadium: Shaanxi Province Stadium; Attendance: 13,865; Referee: Wang Minjie

6 April 2024 3	Shaanxi Union	2–2	Beijing IT	Xi'an
15:30 UTC+8	Xie Zhiwei 5', (yellow card) 44'; Hu Mingtian (yellow card) 72'; Yang Ruiqi (yellow card) 81'; Li Rui 90+7'	Report	10' Chen Jidong; 22' Wang Chenyang; (yellow card) 65' Fu Jingyu; (yellow card) 88' Bai Jiong	Stadium: Shaanxi Province Stadium; Attendance: 22,726; Referee: Xie Lizhi

11 April 2024 4	Shaanxi Union	1–1	Nantong Haimen Codion	Xi'an
15:30 UTC+8	Mi Haolun 19'; Xie Zhiwei (yellow card) 52'; Elkut (yellow card) 61'	Report	(yellow card) 66', (goal) 71' Dai Yuanji	Stadium: Shaanxi Province Stadium; Attendance: 13,323; Referee: Liu Shuang

16 April 2024 5	Shandong Taishan B	0–2	Shaanxi Union	Zoucheng
15:30 UTC+8		Report	32', 45+3' Pang Zhiquan; (yellow card) 83' Ding Jie	Stadium: Zoucheng Sports Centre Stadium; Attendance: 1,839; Referee: Wang Yang

27 April 2024 6	Shaanxi Union	4–0	Tai'an Tiankuang	Weinan
17:00 UTC+8	Pang Zhiquan 24', 64'; Wen Wubin (yellow card) 36'; Wang Weipu (yellow card) 42'; Mi Haolun 67'; Ma Xiaolei 77'	Report	(yellow card) 38' Xie Wenxi; (yellow card) 45+4' Yang Zhaohui	Stadium: Weinan Sports Center Stadium; Attendance: 22,898; Referee: Yuan Shiwei

5 May 2024 7	Langfang Glory City	1–0	Shaanxi Union	Langfang
15:00 UTC+8	Yang Xudong 4'; Chen Nancun (yellow card) 14'; An Shuo (yellow card) 70'	Report	(yellow card) 50' Yao Diran	Stadium: Langfang Stadium; Attendance: 1,521; Referee: He Xiaochun

11 May 2024 8	Rizhao Yuqi	–	Shaanxi Union	Rizhao
19:30 UTC+8				Stadium: Rizhao International Football Center

25 May 2024 9	Shaanxi Union	–	Dalian K'un City	Weinan
17:00 UTC+8				Stadium: Weinan Sports Center Stadium

2 June 2024 10	Shaanxi Union	–	Hubei Istar	Weinan
17:00 UTC+8				Stadium: Weinan Sports Center Stadium

9 June 2024 11	Shaanxi Union	–	Xi'an Chongde Ronghai	Weinan
17:00 UTC+8				Stadium: Weinan Sports Center Stadium

16 June 2024 12	Beijing IT	–	Shaanxi Union	Beijing
17:00 UTC+8				Stadium: BIT Eastern Athletic Field

22 June 2024 13	Nantong Haimen Codion	–	Shaanxi Union	Nantong
19:30 UTC+8				Stadium: Haimen Sports Centre

29 June 2024 14	Shaanxi Union	–	Shandong Taishan B	Weinan
17:00 UTC+8				Stadium: Weinan Sports Center Stadium

7 July 2024 15	Tai'an Tiankuang	–	Shaanxi Union	Tai'an
16:00 UTC+8				Stadium: Taishan Stadium

13 July 2024 16	Shaanxi Union	–	Langfang Glory City	Weinan
17:00 UTC+8				Stadium: Weinan Sports Center Stadium

21 July 2024 17	Shaanxi Union	–	Rizhao Yuqi	Weinan
16:00 UTC+8				Stadium: Weinan Sports Center Stadium

28 July 2024 18	Dalian K'un City	–	Shaanxi Union	Dalian
16:00 UTC+8				Stadium: Jinzhou Stadium

=== Chinese FA Cup ===
Win Draw Loss Fixtures

20 April 2024 Second round	Changchun Xidu	0–5	Shaanxi Union	Changchun
15:00 UTC+8	Wang Hanbing (red card) 39'		3', 76' Wen Shuo; 45+3', 83', 90+2' Ma Xiaolei	Stadium: Changchun Yatai Jingyue Training Ground Main Field; Referee: Wang Yang

17–19 May 2024 Second round	Shaanxi Union	–	Guangzhou	Weinan
15:00 UTC+8				Stadium: Weinan Sports Center Stadium

== Statistics ==
Players with names in italics and marked * were on loan from another club for the whole of their season with Shaanxi Union.
Key to positions: GK – Goalkeeper; DF – Defender; MF – Midfielder; FW – Forward
As of 27 April 2024

No.	Pos	Nat	Player	Total		League Two		CFA Cup	
No.	Pos	Nat	Player	Apps	Goals	Apps	Goals	Apps	Goals
4	DF	(China) CHN	Wang Weipu	6	0	6	0	0	0
5	DF	(China) CHN	Yao Diran	6	0	3+2	0	0+1	0
6	DF	(China) CHN	Ding Jie	7	0	4+2	0	1	0
7	FW	(China) CHN	Ma Xiaolei	4	4	0+3	1	1	3
8	MF	(China) CHN	Xie Zhiwei	6	2	5	2	1	0
9	FW	(China) CHN	Li Rui	4	2	4	2	0	0
11	MF	(China) CHN	Wen Shuo	4	2	0+3	0	1	2
15	MF	(China) CHN	Wen Wubin	6	0	6	0	0	0
16	DF	(China) CHN	Ma Yangyang	3	0	1+1	0	1	0
17	MF	(China) CHN	Wu Chengru	3	1	2	1	0+1	0
19	MF	(China) CHN	Zhang Yuxuan	7	1	5+1	1	0+1	0
21	DF	(China) CHN	Zhao Shuhao	6	0	1+4	0	1	0
22	MF	(China) CHN	Chen Xing	3	0	1+1	0	1	0
25	GK	(China) CHN	Li Chen	4	0	3	0	1	0
26	DF	(China) CHN	Sun Xiaobin	3	0	2	0	1	0
27	GK	(China) CHN	Bai Mingyu	0	0	0	0	0	0
28	GK	(China) CHN	Zhou Yuchen	3	0	3	0	0	0
29	DF	(China) CHN	Mi Haolun	6	3	5+1	3	0	0
32	MF	(China) CHN	Xu Wu	4	1	0+3	1	1	0
34	FW	(China) CHN	Pang Zhiquan	5	4	3+2	4	0	0
38	MF	(China) CHN	Hu Mingtian	5	0	3+1	0	0+1	0
44	DF	(China) CHN	Yang Ruiqi *	3	0	3	0	0	0
45	MF	(China) CHN	Zhong Weihong	5	0	2+2	0	0+1	0
47	DF	(China) CHN	Nureli Tursunali	3	0	0+2	0	1	0
49	DF	(China) CHN	Elkut Eysajan	6	1	4+2	1	0	0
60	GK	(China) CHN	Li Tianle	0	0	0	0	0	0

=== Goals record ===
As of 27 April 2024

Rank	Number	Nationality	Position	Name	League Two	CFA Cup	Total
1	34	(China)	ST	Pang Zhiquan	4	0	4
1	7	(China)	RW	Ma Xiaolei	1	3	4
3	29	(China)	LB	Mi Haolun	3	0	3
4	8	(China)	DM	Xie Zhiwei	2	0	2
4	9	(China)	ST	Li Rui	2	0	2
4	11	(China)	LM	Wen Shuo	0	2	2
7	49	(China)	RB	Elkut Eysajan	1	0	1
7	17	(China)	CM	Wu Chengru	1	0	1
7	19	(China)	CM	Zhang Yuxuan	1	0	1
7	32	(China)	LM	Xu Wu	1	0	1
Total					16	5	21

=== Disciplinary record ===
As of 27 April 2024

Rank	Number	Nationality	Position	Name	League Two			CFA Cup			Total		
Rank	Number	Nationality	Position	Name	Yellow card	(yellow card) (yellow-red card)	Red card	Yellow card	(yellow card) (yellow-red card)	Red card	Yellow card	(yellow card) (yellow-red card)	Red card
1	8	(China)	DM	Xie Zhiwei	3	0	0	0	0	0	0	0	0
2	4	(China)	CB	Wang Weipu	1	0	0	0	0	0	0	0	0
3	17	(China)	CM	Wu Chengru	1	0	0	0	0	0	0	0	0
3	29	(China)	LB	Mi Haolun	1	0	0	0	0	0	0	0	0
3	38	(China)	LM	Hu Mingtian	1	0	0	0	0	0	0	0	0
3	38	(China)	CB	Yang Ruiqi	1	0	0	0	0	0	0	0	0
3	49	(China)	RB	Elkut Eysajan	1	0	0	0	0	0	0	0	0
3	6	(China)	CB	Ding Jie	1	0	0	0	0	0	0	0	0
3	6	(China)	CM	Wen Wubin	1	0	0	0	0	0	0	0	0
Total					12	0	0	0	0	0	10	0	0
