= Xie Zhiwei (disambiguation) =

Xie Zhiwei (born 1998) is a Chinese professional footballer.

Xie Zhiwei may also refer to following other individuals of which name in Chinese character can be transliterated to Hanyu Pinyin:

- Daniel Tse (born 1934), the chair of the University Council of the University of Macau
- Shieh Jhy-wey (born 1955), Taiwanese politician and diplomat
