= Yao Diran =

Chinese footballer (born 1996)

Personal information
- Full name: Yao Diran
- Date of birth: 23 April 1996 (age 30)
- Place of birth: Xi'an, Shaanxi, China
- Height: 1.89 m (6 ft 2 in)
- Position: Centre-back

Team information
- Current team: Ningbo FC
- Number: 5

Senior career*
Years	Team	Apps	(Gls)
2016	Shaanxi Chang'an Athletic		
2017–2018	Dalian Transcendence	0	(0)
2019	Inner Mongolia Zhongyou	0	(0)
2020	Qinghai Oulu International		
2021–2022	Shanxi Longjin	25	(1)
2022–2023	Guangxi Pingguo Haliao	12	(0)
2023	Dandong Tengyue	25	(0)
2024	Shaanxi Union	21	(1)
2025	Guangxi Pingguo	23	(1)
2026–	Ningbo FC	0	(0)
- * Club domestic league appearances and goals as of 13 November 2025

Yao Diran (Chinese: 姚棣然; pinyin: Yáo Dìrán; born 23 April 1996) is a Chinese professional footballer who plays as a centre-back for China League One club Ningbo FC.

== Career ==
=== Early career ===
Born in Xi'an, his senior career began at Shaanxi Chang'an Athletic, where he was a member of a 2016 China Amateur Football League squad that won promotion to the 2017 China League Two.

Yao spent 2017 and 2018 in the reserve team of China League One club Dalian Transcendence, before a move to the reserve team of fellow China League One side Inner Mongolia Zhongyou the following year. In 2020, Yao played for Qinghai Oulu International in the 2020 CMCL season.

=== Shanxi Longjin ===
In 2021, Yao signed for China League Two club Shanxi Longjin after a trial at the club, and made his debut against Hebei Kungfu in the first game of the season on 16 May 2021. Yao quickly became a starter for the club, as they went unbeaten in the first stage of the season. Yao scored his first senior goal on 17 July 2021 in a game against Dandong Tengyue.

=== Guangxi Pingguo Haliao ===
Following Shanxi Longjin's dissolution in April 2022, Yao joined China League One club Guangxi Pingguo Haliao. In his 12 league games, Yao provided 1 assist for the club.

=== Dandong Tengyue ===
In 2023, Yao made a move to newly promoted China League One side Dandong Tengyue. Yao made 27 appearances in the league, where he provided a vital assist against Guangzhou to secure survival for Dandong. On 23 June 2023, Yao scored a 90th-minute equaliser to put a Chinese FA Cup tie against Qingdao Hainiu to penalties, but it would end in a loss for Yao's Dandong Tengyue in the shoot-out.

=== Shaanxi Union ===
On 1 January 2024, China League Two side Shaanxi Union announced that Yao had signed for the club on a two-year contract.

=== Return to Guangxi Pingguo ===
On 24 January 2025, Yao made a return to China League One side Guangxi Pingguo.

=== Ningbo FC ===
After Guangxi Pingguo was dissolved at the end of 2025 season, Yao joined China League One club Ningbo FC.

== Style of play ==
Yao has been described by Shaanxi Union as being aggressive in one-on-one situations and being able to use his height advantage on the pitch.

== Career statistics ==
=== Club ===
As of 8 November 2025

Appearances and goals by club, season, and competition
Club	Season	League			Cup		Continental		Other		Total	
Club	Season	Division	Apps	Goals	Apps	Goals	Apps	Goals	Apps	Goals	Apps	Goals
Shaanxi Chang'an Athletic	2016	CAFL	–		–		–		–		–	
Dalian Transcendence	2017	China League One	0	0	0	0	–		–		0	0
Dalian Transcendence	2018	China League One	0	0	0	0	–		–		0	0
Dalian Transcendence	Total		0	0	0	0	0	0	0	0	0	0
Inner Mongolia Zhongyou	2019	China League One	0	0	0	0	–		–		0	0
Qinghai Oulu International	2020	CMCL	–		–		–		–		–	
Shanxi Longjin	2021	China League Two	25	1	0	0	–		–		25	1
Guangxi Pingguo Haliao	2022	China League One	12	0	0	0	–		–		12	0
Dandong Tengyue	2023	China League One	25	0	2	3	–		–		27	3
Shaanxi Union	2024	China League Two	21	1	2	0	–		–		23	1
Guangxi Pingguo	2025	China League One	23	1	2	0	–		–		25	1
Career total			106	3	6	3	0	0	0	0	112	6
