= Yang Ruiqi =

Chinese footballer (born 2004)

Personal information
- Full name: Yang Ruiqi
- Date of birth: 8 February 2004 (age 22)
- Place of birth: Xi'an, Shaanxi, China
- Height: 1.88 m (6 ft 2 in)
- Position: Centre-back

Team information
- Current team: Shandong Taishan
- Number: 2

Youth career
- 2012–2023: Shandong Taishan

Senior career*
Years	Team	Apps	(Gls)
2022–	Shandong Taishan	8	(0)
2024	→ Shaanxi Union (loan)	19	(1)
2025	→ Shandong Taishan B (res.)	14	(1)
2025	→ Meizhou Hakka (loan)	8	(1)
- * Club domestic league appearances and goals as of 19 November 2026

Yang Ruiqi (simplified Chinese: 杨瑞琦; traditional Chinese: 楊瑞琦; pinyin: Yáng Ruìqí; born 8 February 2004) is a Chinese professional footballer who plays as a centre-back for Chinese Super League club Shandong Taishan.

== Club career ==
Yang Ruiqi was born on 8 February 2004 in Xi'an, Shaanxi, and started playing football at a young age. In 2012, when Yang was eight years old, he was sent to the youth academy in the Luneng Taishan Football School of Chinese Super League outfit Shandong Luneng Taishan. In 2022, he was promoted to the Shandong Taishan first-team to participate in the 2022 AFC Champions League, to avoid quarantining their first-team players upon their return to China due to the COVID-19 pandemic. On 15 April, he made his senior debut in a 7–0 loss to South Korean club Daegu, starting in and playing the full match. A week later on 21 April, he held a clean sheet against Singaporean side Lion City Sailors in a 0–0 stalemate, in what the Asian Football Confederation described as a defensive masterclass from Shandong Taishan. In 2023, he returned to the Shandong Taishan U21 team. In November 2023, Yang helped Shandong Taishan U21 reach the 2023 CFA U-21 League title, gaining promotion to the 2024 China League Two.

On 23 February 2024, Yang Ruiqi joined China League Two club Shaanxi Union on a one-year loan. He chose to wear the number 44 shirt. He made his debut for Shaanxi Union on 23 March in a 2–0 away win against Hubei Istar, helping the club clinch its first ever professional league victory. He scored his only goal for the club in a 2–1 victory away at Guangxi Hengchen on 7 September, grasping a 97th-minute winner. In the 2024 season, Yang totalled 21 appearances and scored only the one goal.

In the 2025 season, he followed Shandong Taishan B to play in China League Two. On 9 April, he provided the team's opener in their 1–1 home draw with Wuxi Wugo. On 24 June 2025, Yang signed on a half-year loan at Chinese Super League club Meizhou Hakka, being given the number 23 shirt. He made his Meizhou Hakka and Chinese Super League debut the following day on 25 June in a 4–0 home loss to Beijing Guoan, coming on as a 59th-minute substitute for Zhong Haoran. On 24 October 2025, Yang scored his first Chinese Super League goal in a 4–1 home defeat to Yunnan Yukun.

== International career ==
In June 2019, Yang was called up to the China U15 to take part in a training camp led by head coach Antonio Puche.

== Career statistics ==
=== Club ===
As of 22 November 2025

Appearances and goals by club, season, and competition
Club	Season	League			Cup		Continental		Other		Total	
Club	Season	Division	Apps	Goals	Apps	Goals	Apps	Goals	Apps	Goals	Apps	Goals
Shandong Taishan	2022	Chinese Super League	0	0	0	0	5 (Note: Appearances in AFC Champions League)	0	–		5	0
Shandong Taishan	2023	Chinese Super League	0	0	0	0	0	0	0 (Note: Appearances in Chinese FA Super Cup)	0	0	0
Shandong Taishan	Total		0	0	0	0	5	0	0	0	5	0
Shaanxi Union (loan)	2024	China League Two	19	1	2	0	–		–		21	1
Shandong Taishan B (res.)	2025	China League Two	14	1	–		–		–		14	1
Meizhou Hakka (loan)	2025	Chinese Super League	8	1	0	0	–		–		8	1
Career total			41	3	2	0	5	0	0	0	48	3
