= Pei Chensong =

Chinese footballer

Pei Chensong 裴晨淞
Personal information
- Date of birth: 30 July 1993 (age 33)
- Place of birth: Dalian, Liaoning, China
- Height: 1.88 m (6 ft 2 in)
- Position: Goalkeeper

Youth career
- Liaoning Whowin
- 2013: Guangzhou R&F

Senior career*
Years	Team	Apps	(Gls)
2014–2019	Guangzhou R&F	3	(0)
2017–2018	→ R&F (Hong Kong) (loan)	2	(0)
2018	→ Hainan Boying (loan)	23	(0)
- * Club domestic league appearances and goals as of 13 October 2018

Pei Chensong (Chinese: 裴晨淞; pinyin: Péi Chénsōng; born 30 July 1993) is a Chinese football player.

== Club career ==
Pei joined Chinese Super League side Guangzhou R&F from Liaoning Whowin in February 2013. He was promoted to the first team squad by Sven-Göran Eriksson in the 2014 season. On 22 October 2016, he made his senior debut in a 3–1 away defeat against Beijing Guoan, coming on for injury Cheng Yuelei at the beginning of second half. He started for Guangzhou R&F in the last two matches of the season against Liaoning and Shijiazhuang Ever Bright, respectively.

In July 2017, Pei was loaned to Guangzhou R&F's satellite team R&F in the Hong Kong Premier League. On 19 September 2017, he made his debut in a 3–2 away loss to Hong Kong Pegasus. After playing two league match for R&F, he lost his position to Zhou Yuchen and returned to Guangzhou R&F in January 2018.

On 7 March 2018, Pei was loaned to China League Two side Hainan Boying until 31 December 2018.

== Career statistics ==
As of 13 October 2018

Club performance			League		Cup		League Cup		Continental		Total	
Season	Club	League	Apps	Goals	Apps	Goals	Apps	Goals	Apps	Goals	Apps	Goals
China PR			League		FA Cup		CSL Cup		Asia		Total	
2014	Guangzhou R&F	Chinese Super League	0	0	0	0	-		-		0	0
2015	Guangzhou R&F	Chinese Super League	0	0	0	0	-		0	0	0	0
2016	Guangzhou R&F	Chinese Super League	3	0	0	0	-		-		3	0
2017	Guangzhou R&F	Chinese Super League	0	0	0	0	-		-		0	0
Hong Kong			League		FA Cup		League Cups^{1}		Asia		Total	
2017–18	R&F	Hong Kong Premier League	2	0	0	0	0	0	-		2	0
China PR			League		FA Cup		CSL Cup		Asia		Total	
2018	Hainan Boying	China League Two	23	0	1	0	-		-		24	0
Total	China PR		26	0	1	0	0	0	0	0	27	0
Total	Hong Kong		2	0	0	0	0	0	0	0	2	0
Career total			28	0	1	0	0	0	0	0	29	0

^{1}League Cups include Hong Kong Senior Challenge Shield, Hong Kong League Cup and Hong Kong Sapling Cup.
