= Hu Mingtian =

Chinese association football player

Personal information
- Date of birth: 7 August 1994 (age 32)
- Place of birth: Xuzhou, Jiangsu, China
- Height: 1.81 m (5 ft 11 in)
- Position: Left midfielder

Team information
- Current team: Guizhou Guiyang Athletic
- Number: 21

Senior career*
Years	Team	Apps	(Gls)
2015–2016	Tianjin Huochetou	28	(6)
2017	Chengdu Qbao	24	(6)
2018–2023	Chengdu Rongcheng	65	(12)
2022	→ Shaanxi Chang'an Athletic (loan)	17	(3)
2023	→ Guangxi Pingguo Haliao (loan)	7	(0)
2023	→ Dandong Tengyue (loan)	11	(0)
2024–2025	Shaanxi Union	35	(7)
2026–	Guizhou Guiyang Athletic	0	(0)
- * Club domestic league appearances and goals as of 00:02, 4 January 2024 (UTC)

Hu Mingtian (Chinese: 胡明天; born 7 August 1994) is a Chinese professional footballer who plays as a left midfielder for China League Two club Guizhou Guiyang Athletic.

== Club career ==
Hu Mingtian would start his senior career with third tier football club Jingtie Locomotive in the 2015 China League Two campaign. The following season he would establish himself as a regular, however at the end of the campaign the club dissolved from the professional league. He would join another third tier club in Chengdu Qbao where he quickly established himself as a regular within their team, however at the end of the season the club withdrew from League Two in 2018 when Qbao Group was under investigation for an illegal fund raising scandal. He would join Chengdu Rongcheng, the phoenix club of Chengdu Qbao in the fourth tier. In his first season he would gain promotion with them and establish himself as a regular within the team as he aided them to a meteoric rise through the divisions as the club gained promotion to the top tier at the end of the 2021 league campaign.

== Career statistics ==
As of 5 November 2023

Club	Season	League			Cup		Other		Total	
Club	Season	Division	Apps	Goals	Apps	Goals	Apps	Goals	Apps	Goals
Tianjin Huochetou	2015	China League Two	8	1	0	0	0	0	8	1
Tianjin Huochetou	2016	China League Two	20	5	1	0	0	0	21	5
Tianjin Huochetou	Total		28	6	1	0	0	0	29	6
Chengdu Qbao	2017	China League Two	24	6	0	0	0	0	24	6
Chengdu Rongcheng	2018	CMCL	–		0	0	0	0	0	0
Chengdu Rongcheng	2019	China League Two	27	7	1	0	0	0	28	7
Chengdu Rongcheng	2020	China League One	11	2	1	0	0	0	12	2
Chengdu Rongcheng	2021	China League One	27	3	2	0	2 (Note: Appearance(s) in CSL Relegation play-offs)	0	31	3
Chengdu Rongcheng	2022	Chinese Super League	2	0	0	0	0	0	0	0
Chengdu Rongcheng	Total		67	12	4	0	2	0	73	12
Shaanxi Chang'an Athletic (loan)	2022	China League One	17	3	0	0	0	0	17	3
Guangxi Pingguo Haliao (loan)	2023	China League One	7	0	0	0	0	0	7	0
Dandong Tengyue (loan)	2023	China League One	11	0	0	0	0	0	11	0
Shaanxi Union	2024	China League Two	0	0	0	0	0	0	0	0
Career total			154	27	5	0	2	0	161	20
