= Wu Chengru =

Chinese association football player

Personal information
- Date of birth: 15 September 2000 (age 26)
- Place of birth: Beijing, China
- Height: 1.78 m (5 ft 10 in)
- Position: Midfielder

Team information
- Current team: Guangzhou R&F
- Number: 28

Youth career
- –2020: Guangzhou R&F

Senior career*
Years	Team	Apps	(Gls)
2020–	Guangzhou City	13	(1)
2021	→ Xinjiang Tianshan Leopard (loan)	12	(1)
- * Club domestic league appearances and goals as of 14:01, 31 December 2022 (UTC)

Wu Chengru (Chinese: 伍承儒; born 15 September 2000) is a Chinese professional footballer who plays as a midfielder for China League Two club Shaanxi Union.

== Club career ==
Wu Chengru would play for the Guangzhou R&F (now known as Guangzhou City) youth team and was promoted to the senior team at the beginning of the 2020 league season where he made his debut on 29 August 2020 against Shenzhen F.C. in a 2-0 defeat. In the following season he was loaned out to second tier club Xinjiang Tianshan Leopard on 5 July 2021 to gain more experience.

== Career statistics ==
As of 31 December 2022.

Club	Season	League			Cup		Continental		Other		Total	
Club	Season	Division	Apps	Goals	Apps	Goals	Apps	Goals	Apps	Goals	Apps	Goals
Guangzhou R&F/ Guangzhou City	2020	Chinese Super League	7	0	2	0	-		-		9	0
Guangzhou R&F/ Guangzhou City	2021	Chinese Super League	0	0	0	0	-		-		0	0
Guangzhou R&F/ Guangzhou City	2022	Chinese Super League	6	1	1	1	-		-		7	2
Guangzhou R&F/ Guangzhou City	Total		13	1	3	1	0	0	0	0	16	2
Xinjiang Tianshan Leopard (loan)	2021	China League One	12	1	0	0	-		-		12	1
Career total			25	2	3	1	0	0	0	0	28	3
