= Xie Zhiwei =

Chinese association football player

Personal information
- Date of birth: 7 January 1998 (age 28)
- Place of birth: Jiangyin, Jiangsu, China
- Height: 1.78 m (5 ft 10 in)
- Position: Defensive midfielder

Senior career*
Years	Team	Apps	(Gls)
2019–2021	Jiangsu Suning	3	(0)
2021–2023	Nanjing City	40	(3)
2021	→ Beijing Sport University (loan)	16	(0)
2023	→ Shanghai Jiading Huilong (loan)	13	(0)
2024–2025	Shaanxi Union	49	(6)

International career
2014	China U-16	3	(0)
- * Club domestic league appearances and goals as of 14:32, 2 January 2024 (UTC)

Xie Zhiwei (simplified Chinese: 谢志伟; traditional Chinese: 謝志偉; pinyin: Xiè Zhìwěi; born 7 January 1998) is a Chinese professional footballer who plays as a defensive midfielder.

== Club career ==
Xie Zhiwei would make his debut for Jiangsu Suning on 23 November 2019 in a league game against Beijing Renhe F.C. that ended in a 3–2 victory. The following season he would be a squad player that won the 2020 Chinese Super League title with them.

== Career statistics ==
As of 18 October 2023

Appearances and goals by club, season and competition
Club	Season	League			National Cup		Continental		Other		Total	
Club	Season	Division	Apps	Goals	Apps	Goals	Apps	Goals	Apps	Goals	Apps	Goals
Jiangsu Suning	2019	Chinese Super League	2	0	0	0	–		–		2	0
Jiangsu Suning	2020	Chinese Super League	1	0	2	0	–		–		3	0
Jiangsu Suning	Total		3	0	2	0	0	0	0	0	5	0
Nanjing City	2021	China League One	0	0	0	0	–		–		0	0
Nanjing City	2022	China League One	32	3	2	0	–		–		34	3
Nanjing City	2023	China League One	8	0	1	0	–		–		9	0
Nanjing City	Total		40	3	3	0	0	0	0	0	43	3
Beijing Sport University (loan)	2021	China League One	16	0	0	0	–		–		16	0
Shanghai Jiading Huilong (loan)	2023	China League One	13	0	0	0	–		–		13	0
Shaanxi Union	2024	China League Two	0	0	0	0	–		–		0	0
Career total			72	3	5	0	0	0	0	0	77	3

== Honours ==
=== Club ===
Jiangsu Suning

- Chinese Super League: 2020
