= Zhao Ming (footballer, born 1987) =

Chinese footballer

Zhao Ming 赵铭
Personal information
- Date of birth: October 3, 1987 (age 39)
- Place of birth: Zhaozhou, Heilongjiang, China
- Height: 1.89 m (6 ft 2 1/2 in)
- Position: Defender

Youth career
- Yanbian FC

Senior career*
Years	Team	Apps	(Gls)
2003–2006	Yanbian FC	30	(1)
2007–2014	Guangzhou R&F	38	(0)
2015–2016	Yanbian FC	21	(0)
2017–2018	R&F Hong Kong	6	(0)
2021	Xi'an Wolves		

International career
2005–2006	China U19		
2007–2008	China U22		

Managerial career
- 2022–2023: Guangxi Pingguo Haliao (assistant)
- 2024–2025: Wenzhou FC (assistant)
Medal record
Men's football
Representing China
East Asian Games
Gold medal – first place	2001 Macau	Football
- * Club domestic league appearances and goals as of 13 May 2018

Zhao Ming (simplified Chinese: 赵铭; traditional Chinese: 趙銘; pinyin: Zhào Míng; born 3 October 1987) is a Chinese former football player.

== Club career ==
Zhao was born in Zhaozhou County, Heilongjiang and moved to Yanbian Korean Autonomous Prefecture's capital city Yanji with his family when he was still a boy. He began to play organized football in 1998 and was promoted to Yanbian FC first team squad in 2003. He was one of the few Han Chinese in the club and promoted to China League One with the club in the 2004 league season.

In December 2006, Zhao transferred to Chinese Super League side Shenyang Ginde with a fee of ¥3 million. Then he followed the club to move to Changsha in early 2007. On 4 March 2007, he made his Super League debut in the first round of the 2007 league season which Changsha Ginde lost to Dalian Shide 1–0. He remained as club's regular starter after this match and eventually made 13 league appearances in the first half of the year. However, on 1 July, he suffered a torn medial collateral ligament in his left knee when he played with China U-23 against Cameroon U-23 in South Africa, ruling him out for the rest of the season. He returned to the field in December and still acted as the regular starter in the 2008 league season. In July 2008, he suffered a recurrence of the knee injury in the U-23s' training, meaning he would be dropped from the team for the 2008 Summer Olympics.

Zhao was excluded from the first team squad in the 2010 league season as Changsha Ginde finished bottom and were relegated to China League One. In February 2011, the club moved to Shenzhen as the club's name changed to Shenzhen Phoenix. The club offered a new contract to Zhao whom was still recovering from injury. On 5 May 2011, after three years out, Zhao started and played the full ninety minutes against Shenyang Dongjin in the first round of the 2011 Chinese FA Cup. The club were then bought by Chinese property developers Guangzhou R&F and moved to Guangzhou in June and won promotion back to the Super League at the first attempt. Zhao made 6 league appearances in the 2011 season. Zhao played as a bench player after Guangzhou R&F returned to the Super League.

Zhao returned to Yanbian FC in February 2015. He played 21 matches in the 2015 season as Yanbian won the champions of the league and promoted to the first tier. Zhao terminated his contract with Yanbian in September 2016 after his daughter was born.

In late June 2017, Zhao was transferred to R&F's Hong Kong based satellite club.

== International career ==
Zhao was called up for China U-20 in the 2005 FIFA World Youth Championship held by Netherlands and acted as starter in center back position with Feng Xiaoting. He was expected to play for Chinese Olympic team in the 2008 Summer Olympics; however, he was dropped from the team due to knee injury.

== Career statistics ==
Statistics accurate as of match played 13 May 2018

Club performance			League		Cup		League Cup		Continental		Total	
Season	Club	League	Apps	Goals	Apps	Goals	Apps	Goals	Apps	Goals	Apps	Goals
China PR			League		FA Cup		CSL Cup		Asia		Total	
2003	Yanbian FC	China League Two			-		-		-			
2004	Yanbian FC	China League Two			-		-		-			
2005	Yanbian FC	China League One	14	0	1	0	-		-		15	0
2006	Yanbian FC	China League One	16	1	0	0	-		-		16	1
2007	Guangzhou R&F	Chinese Super League	13	0	-		-		-		13	0
2008	Guangzhou R&F	Chinese Super League	8	0	-		-		-		8	0
2009	Guangzhou R&F	Chinese Super League	0	0	-		-		-		0	0
2011	Guangzhou R&F	China League One	6	0	2	0	-		-		8	0
2012	Guangzhou R&F	Chinese Super League	10	0	2	0	-		-		12	0
2013	Guangzhou R&F	Chinese Super League	0	0	0	0	-		-		0	0
2014	Guangzhou R&F	Chinese Super League	1	0	1	0	-		-		2	0
2015	Yanbian FC	China League One	21	0	1	0	-		-		22	0
2016	Yanbian FC	Chinese Super League	0	0	-		-		-		0	0
Hong Kong			League		HKFA Cup		League Cups^{1}		Asia		Total	
2017-18	R&F FC	Hong Kong Premier League	6	0	0	0	1	0	-		7	0
Total	China PR		89	1	7	0	0	0	0	0	96	1
Total	Hong Kong		6	0	0	0	1	0	0	0	7	0
Career total			95	1	7	0	1	0	0	0	103	1

^{1}League Cups include Hong Kong Senior Challenge Shield and Hong Kong Sapling Cup.

== Honours ==
Yanbian FC

- China League One: 2015
