= Zhang Jiajie =

Chinese footballer

Zhang Jiajie 张嘉杰
Personal information
- Date of birth: 27 February 1997 (age 29)
- Place of birth: Guangzhou, Guangdong, China
- Height: 1.75 m (5 ft 9 in)
- Position: Midfielder

Team information
- Current team: Guangzhou R&F
- Number: 63

Youth career
- 2012–2016: Guangzhou R&F

Senior career*
Years	Team	Apps	(Gls)
2016–	Guangzhou R&F	6	(0)
2017–2018	→ R&F (loan)	11	(0)
2019	→ Sichuan Longfor (loan)	4	(0)
- * Club domestic league appearances and goals as of 31 December 2020

Zhang Jiajie (simplified Chinese: 张嘉杰; traditional Chinese: 張嘉傑; pinyin: Zhāng Jiājié; born 27 February 1997) is a Chinese professional footballer who currently plays for Chinese Super League side Guangzhou R&F.

== Club career ==
Zhang Jiajie was promoted to Chinese Super League side Guangzhou R&F's first team squad by manager Dragan Stojković in July 2016. In August 2017, he was loaned to Guangzhou R&F's satellite team R&F (Hong Kong) in the Hong Kong Premier League. On 9 September 2017, he made his senior debut in a 3–2 away loss to Hong Kong Pegasus. Zhang returned to Guangzhou R&F in the summer of 2018. On 18 August 2018, he made his debut for the club in a 5–2 home win over Changchun Yatai, coming on as a substitute for Xiao Zhi in the half time.

On 1 March 2019, Zhang was loaned to League One newcomer Sichuan Longfor for the 2019 season.

== Career statistics ==
As of 31 December 2020.

Appearances and goals by club, season and competition
Club	Season	League			National Cup		League Cup		Continental		Total	
Club	Season	Division	Apps	Goals	Apps	Goals	Apps	Goals	Apps	Goals	Apps	Goals
Guangzhou R&F	2016	Chinese Super League	0	0	0	0	-		-		0	0
Guangzhou R&F	2017	Chinese Super League	0	0	0	0	-		-		0	0
Guangzhou R&F	2018	Chinese Super League	6	0	1	0	-		-		7	0
Guangzhou R&F	Total		6	0	1	0	0	0	0	0	7	0
R&F (loan)	2017–18	Hong Kong Premier League	11	0	1	0	1 (Note: Appearances in Hong Kong Senior Challenge Shield)	0	-		13	0
Sichuan Longfor (loan)	2019	China League One	4	0	0	0	-		-		4	0
Career total			21	0	2	0	1	0	0	0	24	0
