= Li Rui (footballer) =

Chinese footballer

Li Rui 李锐
Personal information
- Date of birth: 2 May 1994 (age 32)
- Place of birth: Huizhou, Guangdong, China
- Height: 1.90 m (6 ft 3 in)
- Position: Forward

Youth career
- 2000–2004: Bayi
- 2005: Qinhuangdao China Football School
- 2005–2010: Shenzhen Yantian Football School
- 2011–2012: Mafra
- 2012: Sporting CP
- 2013–2014: Shenzhen Ruby

Senior career*
Years	Team	Apps	(Gls)
2014–2015	1º de Dezembro	17	(3)
2015–2016	Aves	2	(0)
2015–2016	→ Oliveirense (loan)	10	(1)
2016–2017	Braga	0	(0)
2016–2017	→ Académica de Coimbra (loan)	1	(0)
2017	→ Trofense (loan)	4	(0)
2017–2018	R&F	14	(6)
2018–2019	Guangzhou R&F	3	(0)
2020	Guangxi Baoyun	9	(1)
2021–2022	Nanjing City	47	(9)
2023	Guangxi Pingguo Haliao	10	(0)
2024	Shaanxi Union	19	(5)
- * Club domestic league appearances and goals as of 25 February 2024

Li Rui (simplified Chinese: 李锐; traditional Chinese: 李銳; pinyin: Lǐ Ruì; born 2 May 1994) is a Chinese former professional footballer who played as a forward.

On 10 September 2024, Chinese Football Association announced that Li was banned from football-related activities for lifetime for involving in match-fixing.

== Career ==
Li Rui started his professional football career in 2014 when he was signed by Campeonato de Portugal side 1º de Dezembro. He scored first senior goal on 30 November 2014, in a 2–0 away win against Sintrense. Li scored three goals in 17 appearances in the 2014–2015 season. Li transferred to LigaPro side Aves in the summer of 2015. He made his debut for Aves on 8 August 2015, in a 1–0 home defeat against Covilhã, coming on for Ernest Nyarko in the 67th minute. He was loaned to Campeonato de Portugal club Oliveirense in September 2015.

Li transferred to Primeira Liga side Braga on 8 January 2016. He was loaned to LigaPro side Académica de Coimbra on 8 August 2016. He made his debut for Académica on 25 September 2016, in the second round of 2016–17 Taça de Portugal against Gouveia, coming on as a substitute for Rui Miguel in the 61st minute. On 30 October 2016, he made his league debut for the club in a 0–0 home draw against Gil Vicente, coming on for Pedro Nuno in the 75th minute. Failing to establish at Académica, Li was loaned to Campeonato de Portugal side Trofense in February 2017.

Li joined Hong Kong Premier League side R&F in August 2017. On 16 September 2017, he made his debut and scored his first goal for the club in a 3–1 away loss against Southern District. He scored twice on 28 October 2017 against Yuen Long, which ensured R&F's first victory of the season. On 18 January 2018, R&F (Hong Kong)'s parent club Guangzhou R&F signed Li to their squad. He was then loaned to R&F (Hong Kong) again for the rest of 2017–18 season. Li returned to Guangzhou R&F in the summer of 2018. On 21 October 2018, he made his debut for Guangzhou R&F in a 2–0 away defeat against Henan Jianye.

== Career statistics ==
As of match played 5 November 2023

Appearances and goals by club, season and competition
Club	Season	League			National cup		League cup		Continental		Other		Total	
Club	Season	Division	Apps	Goals	Apps	Goals	Apps	Goals	Apps	Goals	Apps	Goals	Apps	Goals
1º de Dezembro	2014–15	Campeonato de Portugal	17	3	0	0	–		–		–		17	3
Aves	2015–16	LigaPro	2	0	0	0	0	0	–		–		2	0
Oliveirense (loan)	2015–16	Campeonato de Portugal	10	1	0	0	–		–		–		10	1
Académica de Coimbra (loan)	2016–17	LigaPro	1	0	1	0	0	0	–		–		2	0
Trofense (loan)	2016–17	Campeonato de Portugal	4	0	0	0	–		–		–		4	0
R&F	2017–18	Hong Kong Premier League	14	6	1	0	1 (Note: Appearances in Hong Kong Senior Challenge Shield)	0	–		4 (Note: Appearances in Hong Kong Sapling Cup)	0	20	6
Guangzhou R&F	2018	Chinese Super League	3	0	0	0	–		–		–		3	0
Guangzhou R&F	2019	Chinese Super League	0	0	0	0	–		–		–		0	0
Guangzhou R&F	Total		3	0	0	0	0	0	0	0	0	0	3	0
Guangxi Baoyun	2020	China League Two	9	1	–		–		–		–		9	1
Nanjing City	2021	China League One	23	5	1	0	–		–		–		26	5
Nanjing City	2022	China League One	24	4	1	0	–		–		–		25	4
Nanjing City	Total		47	9	2	0	0	0	0	0	0	0	49	9
Guangxi Pingguo Haliao	2023	China League One	10	0	1	0	–		–		–		11	0
Shaanxi Union	2024	China League Two	0	0	0	0	–		–		–		0	0
Career total			117	20	5	0	1	0	0	0	4	0	127	20
