= Chow Cheuk Fung =

Hong Kong footballer

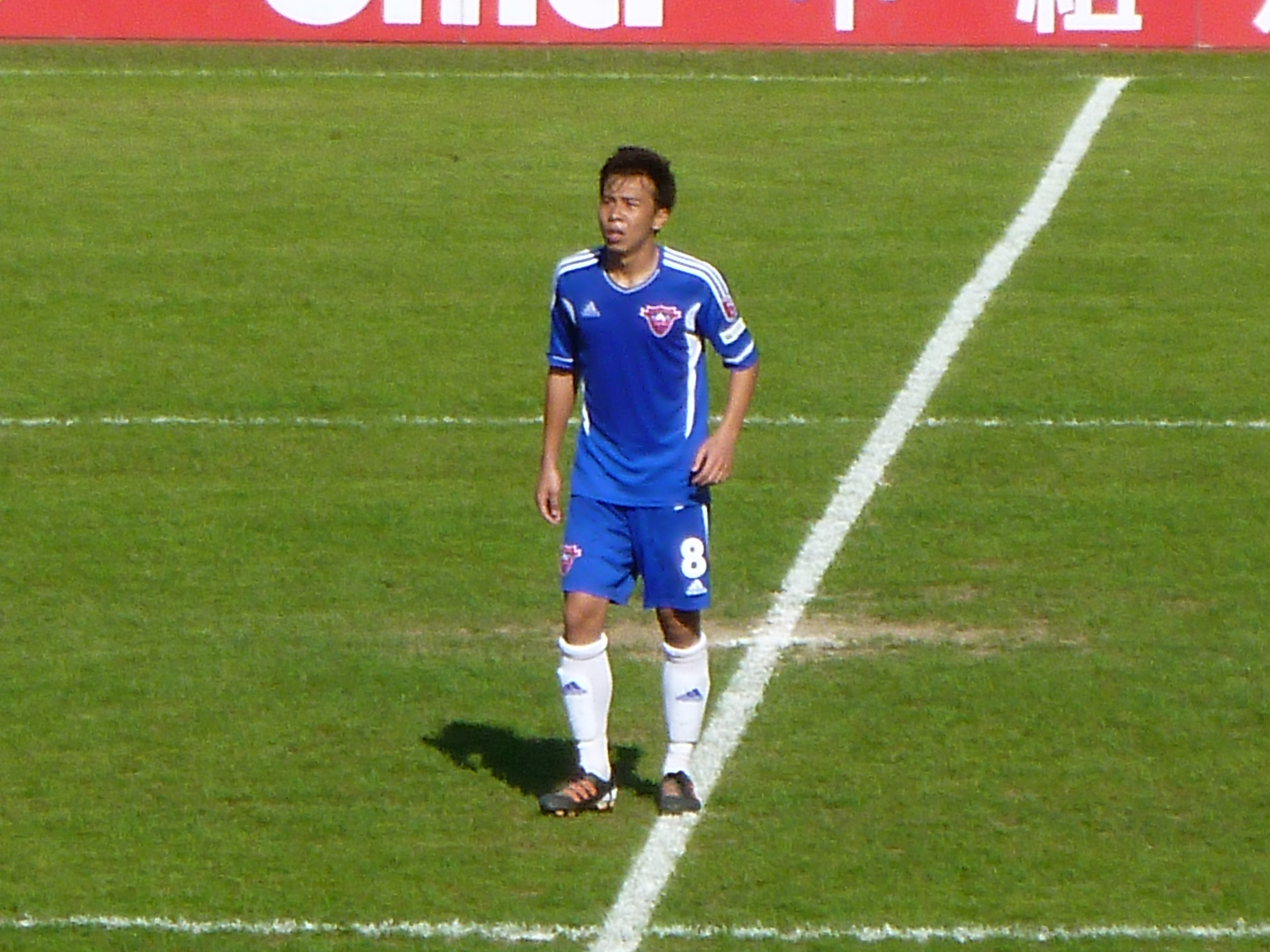

Personal information
- Full name: Chow Cheuk Fung
- Date of birth: 1 August 1989 (age 37)
- Place of birth: Hong Kong
- Height: 1.74 m (5 ft 9 in)
- Position: Central midfielder

Team information
- Current team: Icanfield

Youth career
- 200x–2006: Hong Kong Rangers

Senior career*
Years	Team	Apps	(Gls)
2006–2013	Tuen Mun	37	(1)
2013–2017	Hong Kong Rangers	62	(0)
2017–2018	R&F	7	(0)
2018	Hong Kong Rangers	9	(0)
2019–2022	Icanfield	27	(0)
2022–2023	Tung Sing	24	(0)
2023–2025	Tuen Mun	18	(0)

International career
2011	Hong Kong U-23	4	(0)
- * Club domestic league appearances and goals

Chow Cheuk Fung (Chinese: 周綽豐; Cantonese Yale: Jāu Cheukfūng, born 1 August 1989 in Hong Kong) is a former Hong Kong professional footballer.

== Club career ==
During his youth, Chow trained with Hong Kong Rangers academy. In 2006, Chow moved to Tuen Mun where his father was also the Director of Football, in order to assist with his family's transportation business.

During the 2008–09 season, Chow led Tuen Mun to the Hong Kong Third District Division League title and first place in the Final Round. The following season, he led Tuen Mun to their second successive promotion, finishing runners up in the 2009-10 Second Division season. As a result of reaching the top flight, Chow was rewarded with a full-time contract.

On 11 January 2011, Chow scored the first goal of his professional career in a Hong Kong League Cup match against South China.

Chow returned to Rangers in the summer of 2012 after six years with Tuen Mun. On 5 February 2016, Chow scored his first goal in four years in a 2015–16 Hong Kong FA Cup Round 1 victory over Sun Hei.

In June 2017, Chow signed a contract with R&F worth a monthly salary of HKD 50,000.

== International career ==
In 2011, Chow was named to the Hong Kong national under-23 football team for the 2012 Olympic qualifiers. On 23 March 2015, Chow was selected but did not appear with the Hong Kong national football team for a friendly against Guam.
