= Yiu Ho Ming =

Hong Kong footballer

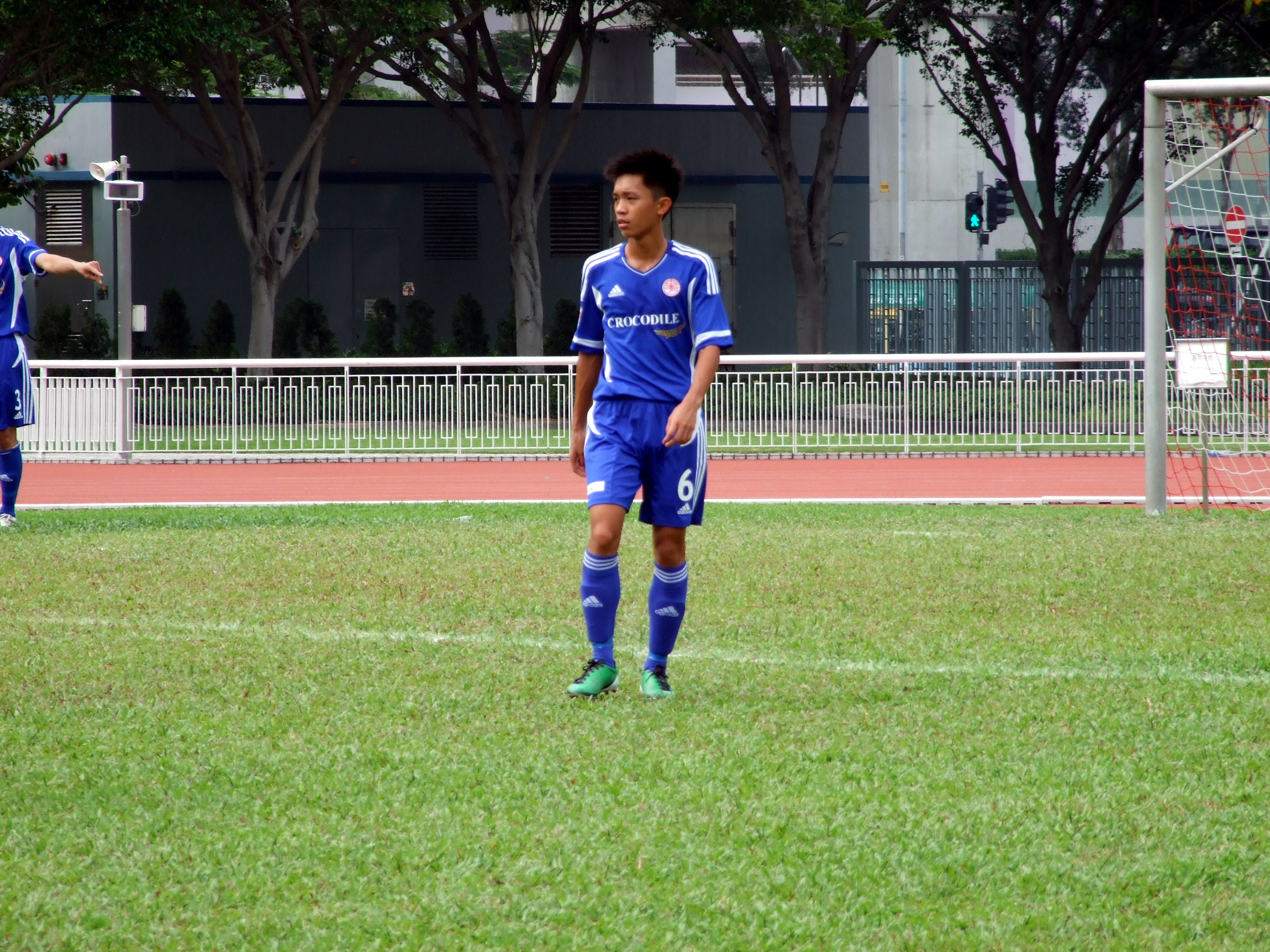

Personal information
- Full name: Yiu Ho Ming
- Date of birth: 1 May 1995 (age 31)
- Place of birth: Hong Kong
- Height: 1.76 m (5 ft 9 in)
- Positions: Left back; midfielder

Team information
- Current team: HKFC
- Number: 19

Youth career
- 2008–2010: Eastern

Senior career*
Years	Team	Apps	(Gls)
2010–2020	Eastern	45	(14)
2014–2015	→ Tai Po (loan)	9	(0)
2015–2016	→ Dreams Metro Gallery (loan)	12	(2)
2016–2018	→ Yuen Long (loan)	28	(3)
2019	→ Pegasus (loan)	2	(0)
2020	→ Yuen Long (loan)	1	(0)
2020–2025	Rangers (HKG)	63	(4)
2025–2026	Eastern	12	(1)
2026–	HKFC	6	(0)

International career^{‡}
2013	Hong Kong U-19	2	(0)
2017–2018	Hong Kong U-22	4	(0)
- * Club domestic league appearances and goals as of 8 November 2026 ‡ National team caps and goals as of 27 March 2018

Yiu Ho Ming (Chinese: 姚浩明; born 1 May 1995) is a Hong Kong professional footballer who currently plays as a left back for Hong Kong Premier League club HKFC.

== Club career ==
In 2008, Yiu joined Eastern.

On 24 March 2013, Yiu scored a goal for Eastern against Happy Valley, which the match wins 1–0.

In July 2014, Yiu was loaned to Tai Po.

In July 2015, Yiu was loaned to Dreams Metro Gallery.

On 24 April 2016, Yiu scored his first goal for Metro Gallery against Southern, which the match draws 1–1.

In August 2016, Yiu was loaned to Yuen Long for 2 seasons.

In the 2018–19 season, Yiu finally got the chance to play for Eastern, appearing in 9 league matches.

However, in July 2019, Yiu was loaned out again and he joined Pegasus for the first half of the season. On 13 January 2020, he left the club after terminating his loan contract.

On 15 January 2020, Yiu was loaned to Yuen Long again for the rest of the season.

In July 2020, Yiu was released by Eastern after his contract expired.

On 10 September 2020, Rangers' Director of Football Philip Lee declared that Yiu would join the club.

On 20 July 2025, Yiu returned to Eastern after 5 years.

On 21 August 2026, Yiu joined HKFC.

== International career ==
In July 2022, Yiu was selected into the final squad of the Hong Kong national team for the first time for the Final Round of the 2022 EAFF E-1 Football Championship. However, he was an unused substitute throughout the competition.

== Honours ==
=== Club ===
Yuen Long

- Hong Kong Senior Shield: 2017–18

Rangers

- Hong Kong Sapling Cup: 2023–24
