= Vas Nuñez =

Hong Kong footballer (born 1995)

Vas Nuñez 勞烈斯
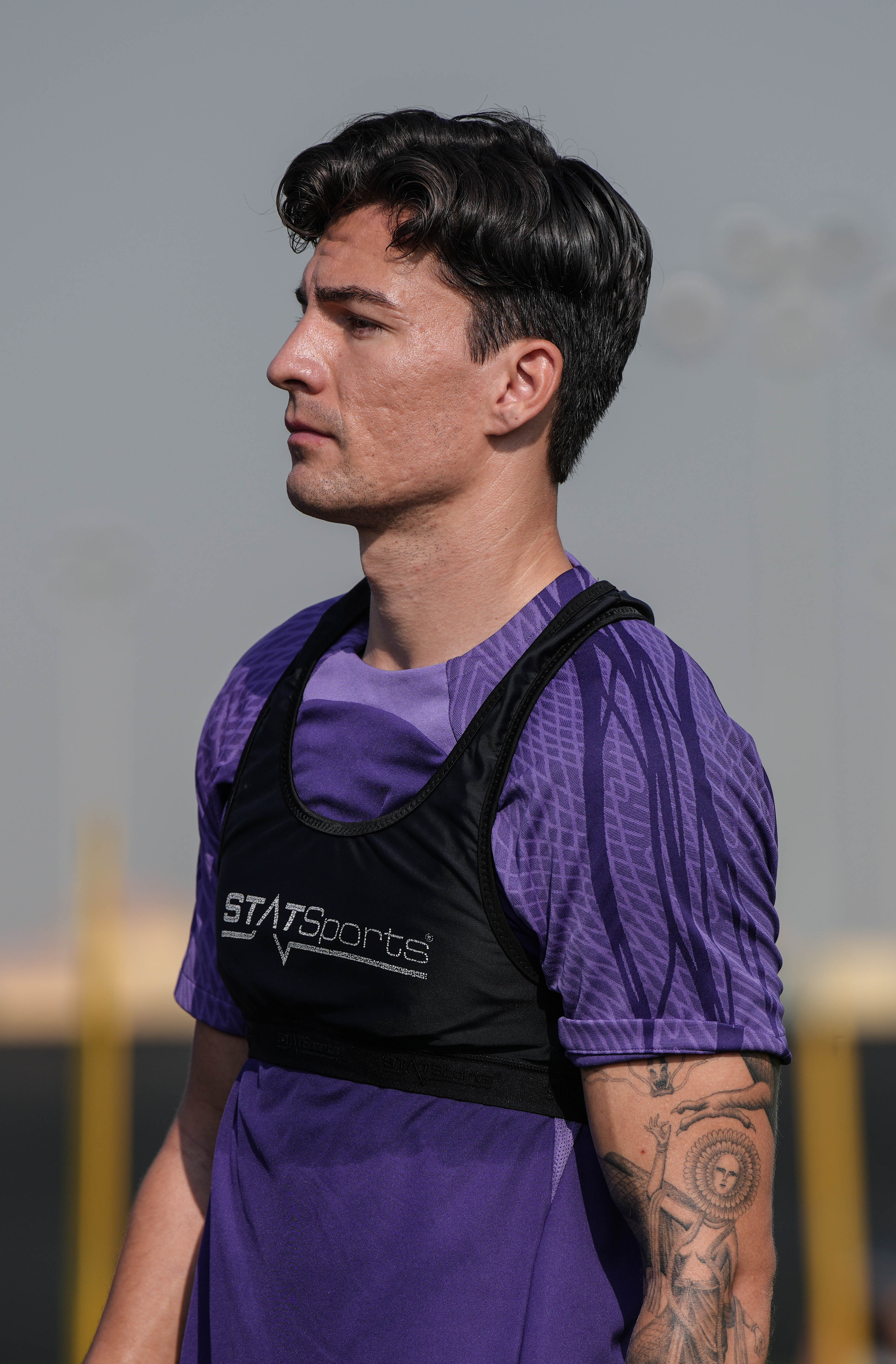
- Nuñez training with Hong Kong in 2023

Personal information
- Full name: Vasudeva Das Lilley Nuñez
- Date of birth: 22 November 1995 (age 30)
- Place of birth: British Hong Kong
- Height: 1.93 m (6 ft 4 in)
- Position: Centre back

Team information
- Current team: Yanbian Longding
- Number: 4

Youth career
- 2009–2010: HKFC
- 2010–2011: Brasil Top Skills Soccer School
- 2012–2014: United Services RC
- 2014–2015: Eastern

Senior career*
Years	Team	Apps	(Gls)
2015–2017	Eastern	0	(0)
2015–2016	→ Dreams Metro Gallery (loan)	4	(1)
2016–2017	→ Biu Chun Glory Sky (loan)	11	(2)
2017–2020	R&F	24	(1)
2021–2022	Meizhou Hakka	36	(0)
2022–2023	Dalian Pro	27	(0)
2024	Guangxi Pingguo Haliao	10	(1)
2025–	Yanbian Longding	34	(0)

International career^{‡}
2018	Hong Kong U23	4	(0)
2022–	Hong Kong	19	(0)
Medal record
Men's football
Representing Hong Kong
FIFA ASEAN Challenge Cup
Winner	2026 Hong Kong
- * Club domestic league appearances and goals as of 7 November 2026 ‡ National team caps and goals as of 30 September 2026

Vasudeva Das Lilley Nuñez (Chinese: 勞烈斯; born 22 November 1995), commonly known as Vas Nuñez, is a Hong Kong professional footballer who currently plays as a centre back for China League One club Yanbian Longding and the Hong Kong national team.

== Club career ==
Núñez joined Eastern in 2015 and was loaned to Metro Gallery for the 2015–16 season.

Núñez scored his first professional goal for Metro Gallery on 6 March 2016, in a 2–3 away loss to Wong Tai Sin.

On 4 July 2017, R&F announced that they had acquired Núñez from Eastern. On 14 October 2020, Núñez left the club after his club's withdrawal from the HKPL in the new season.

In February 2021, it was reported that Núñez would join China League One club Meizhou Hakka.

On 21 August 2022, Núñez joined Dalian Pro. He contributed an assist in his second start for the club, helping his club to secure a 2–2 draw against Beijing Guoan on 24 September 2022.

On 8 January 2024, Núñez joined Guangxi Pingguo Haliao.

On 17 June 2025, Núñez joined Yanbian Longding.

== International career ==
On 4 May 2018, Núñez was granted the Hong Kong SAR Passport. He was then called up to the U-23 squad for the 2018 Asian Games.

On 11 July 2022, Núñez was named to the preliminary squad in preparation for the 2022 EAFF E-1 Football Championship.

On 19 July 2022, Núñez made his international debut for Hong Kong in a 2022 EAFF E-1 Football Championship match against Japan.

On 26 December 2023, Núñez was named in Hong Kong's squad for the 2023 AFC Asian Cup.

== Personal life ==
The fifth of six children, Núñez was born in Hong Kong to a British father and a Mexican mother. His parents divorced when he was young, and he and his five siblings grew up on Lamma Island where they lived in poverty. Due to the family's financial situation, they were nearly homeless on three to four occasions, and Nuñez was forced to drop out of school after Secondary 3 as his family could no longer afford it.

== Career statistics ==
=== Club ===
As of 29 October 2023

Club	Season	League			National cup		League cup		Continental		Other		Total	
Club	Season	Division	Apps	Goals	Apps	Goals	Apps	Goals	Apps	Goals	Apps	Goals	Apps	Goals
Eastern	2015–16	Hong Kong Premier League	0	0	0	0	0	0	–		0	0	0	0
Eastern	2016–17	Hong Kong Premier League	0	0	0	0	0	0	0	0	0	0	0	0
Eastern	Total		0	0	0	0	0	0	0	0	0	0	0	0
Dreams Metro Gallery (loan)	2015–16	Hong Kong Premier League	4	1	1 (Note: Appearances in the Hong Kong FA Cup)	0	3 (Note: Appearances in the Hong Kong League Cup)	0	–		1 (Note: Appearances in the Hong Kong Sapling Cup)	0	9	1
Biu Chun Glory Sky (loan)	2016–17	Hong Kong Premier League	11	2	2	1	0	0	–		2 (Note: Appearances in the Hong Kong Senior Shield)	0	15	3
R&F	2017–18	Hong Kong Premier League	13	0	1	0	2	0	–		1	0	17	0
R&F	2018–19	Hong Kong Premier League	8	1	0	0	3	0	–		0	0	11	1
R&F	2019–20	Hong Kong Premier League	3	0	1	0	3	0	–		0	0	7	0
R&F	Total		39	4	5	1	11	0	0	0	4	0	59	5
Meizhou Hakka	2021	China League One	33	0	0	0	0	0	–		0	0	33	0
Meizhou Hakka	2022	Chinese Super League	3	0	0	0	0	0	–		0	0	3	0
Meizhou Hakka	Total		36	0	0	0	8	0	0	0	0	0	36	0
Dalian Pro	2022	Chinese Super League	6	0	0	0	0	0	–		0	0	6	0
Dalian Pro	2023	Chinese Super League	21	0	1	0	0	0	–		0	0	22	0
Dalian Pro	Total		27	0	1	0	0	0	0	0	0	0	28	0
Career total			102	4	6	1	11	0	0	0	4	0	123	5

=== International ===
As of 30 September 2026

National team	Year	Apps	Goals
Hong Kong	2022	3	0
Hong Kong	2023	5	0
Hong Kong	2024	5	0
Hong Kong	2025	2	0
Hong Kong	2025	1	0
Hong Kong	2026	3	0
Total		19	0

#	Date	Venue	Opponent	Result	Competition
1	19 July 2022	Kashima Stadium, Kashima, Japan	Japan	0–6	2022 EAFF E-1 Football Championship
2	24 July 2022	Toyota Stadium, Toyota, Japan	South Korea	0–3	2022 EAFF E-1 Football Championship
3	27 July 2022	Toyota Stadium, Toyota, Japan	China	0–1	2022 EAFF E-1 Football Championship
4	28 March 2023	Sultan Ibrahim Stadium, Johor, Malaysia	Malaysia	0–2	Friendly
5	19 June 2023	Hong Kong Stadium, So Kon Po, Hong Kong	Thailand	0–1	Friendly
6	19 June 2023	Hong Kong Stadium, So Kon Po, Hong Kong	Bhutan	4–0	2026 FIFA World Cup qualification – AFC first round
7	16 November 2023	Azadi Stadium, Tehran, Iran	Iran	0–4	2026 FIFA World Cup qualification – AFC second round
8	21 November 2023	Hong Kong Stadium, So Kon Po, Hong Kong	Turkmenistan	2–2	2026 FIFA World Cup qualification – AFC second round
9	14 January 2024	Khalifa International Stadium, Al Rayyan, Qatar	United Arab Emirates	1–3	2023 AFC Asian Cup
10	19 January 2024	Khalifa International Stadium, Al Rayyan, Qatar	Iran	0–1	2023 AFC Asian Cup
11	23 January 2024	Abdullah bin Khalifa Stadium, Doha, Qatar	Palestine	0–3	2023 AFC Asian Cup

== Honours ==
Hong Kong

- FIFA ASEAN Challenge Cup: 2026
