= Chen Fuhai =

Chinese footballer

Chen Fuhai 陈富海
Personal information
- Full name: Chen Fuhai
- Date of birth: 9 February 1997 (age 29)
- Place of birth: Guangzhou, Guangdong, China
- Position: Midfielder

Youth career
- Guangzhou R&F

Senior career*
Years	Team	Apps	(Gls)
2016–2023	Guangzhou R&F	0	(0)
2017–2019	→ R&F (loan)	19	(3)
2021	→ Sichuan Minzu (loan)		
2021	→ Qingdao Youth Island (loan)		
2022-2023	Qingdao Youth Island		
2023	→ Qingdao Red Lions (loan)		
2024	Guangzhou Alpha		
- * Club domestic league appearances and goals as of 31 December 2020

Chen Fuhai (simplified Chinese: 陈富海; traditional Chinese: 陳富海; born 9 February 1997) is a Chinese footballer who plays as Midfielder.

== Club career ==
Chen Fuhai was promoted to Chinese Super League side Guangzhou R&F first team squad by manager Dragan Stojković in July 2016. In August 2017, he was loaned to Hong Kong Premier League side R&F (Hong Kong), which was the satellite team of Guangzhou R&F. On 9 September 2017, he made his professional senior debut in a 3–2 away loss to Hong Kong Pegasus. He scored his first senior goal on 5 November 2017 in a 2–1 home win over Dreams FC.

== Career statistics ==
As of 31 December 2020.

Appearances and goals by club, season and competition
Club	Season	League			National Cup		League Cup		Continental		Other		Total	
Club	Season	Division	Apps	Goals	Apps	Goals	Apps	Goals	Apps	Goals	Apps	Goals	Apps	Goals
Guangzhou R&F	2016	Chinese Super League	0	0	0	0	-		-		-		0	0
Guangzhou R&F	2017	Chinese Super League	0	0	0	0	-		-		-		0	0
Guangzhou R&F	Total		0	0	0	0	0	0	0	0	0	0	0	0
R&F	2017–18	Hong Kong Premier League	17	3	1	0	1 (Note: Appearances in Hong Kong Senior Challenge Shield)	0	-		3 (Note: Appearances in Hong Kong Sapling Cup)	0	22	3
R&F	2018–19	Hong Kong Premier League	2	0	0	0	0	0	-		0	0	2	0
R&F	Total		19	3	0	0	0	0	0	0	0	0	4	0
Career total			19	3	1	0	1	0	0	0	3	0	24	3
