= Zhou Yuchen =

Chinese footballer

Zhou Yuchen 周煜辰
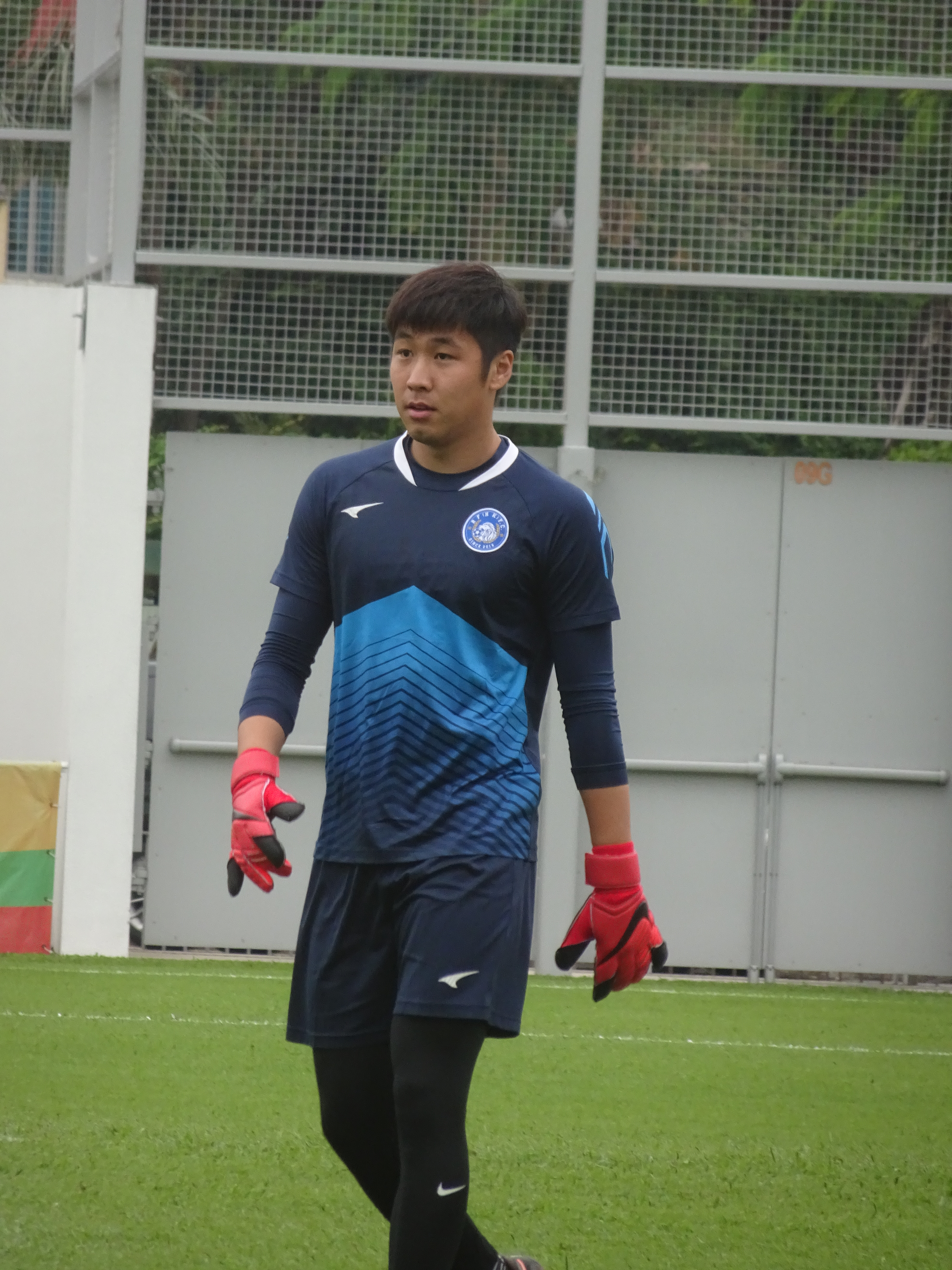

Personal information
- Full name: Zhou Yuchen
- Date of birth: 12 January 1995 (age 31)
- Place of birth: Weifang, Shandong, China
- Height: 1.84 m (6 ft 0 in)
- Position: Goalkeeper

Team information
- Current team: Xiamen Feilu (on loan from Shaanxi Union)
- Number: 28

Youth career
- 2005–2014: Shandong Luneng

Senior career*
| Years | Team | Apps | (Gls) |
| 2014 | → Sacavenense (loan) | 0 | (0) |
| 2015–2020 | Shandong Luneng | 0 | (0) |
| 2016 | → Hebei China Fortune (loan) | 0 | (0) |
| 2017–2020 | → R&F (loan) | 44 | (0) |
| 2021–2022 | Guangzhou City | 1 | (0) |
| 2023 | Guangzhou E-Power | 7 | (0) |
| 2024– | Shaanxi Union | 42 | (0) |
| 2026– | → Xiamen Feilu (loan) | 0 | (0) |

International career^{‡}
| 2013–2014 | China U19 | 9 | (0) |
| 2015–2018 | China U23 | 20 | (0) |
- * Club domestic league appearances and goals as of 31 December 2025 ‡ National team caps and goals as of 5 June 2018

Zhou Yuchen (Chinese: 周煜辰; pinyin: Zhōu Yùchén; born 12 January 1995) is a Chinese professional footballer who plays as a goalkeeper for China League Two club Xiamen Feilu on loan from Shaanxi Union.

== Club career ==
In 2005, Zhou Yuchen joined Chinese Super League side Shandong Luneng Taishan's football school, where he was converted from a defender into a goalkeeper. He was sent to Portugal for further training by the club in January 2014. He joined Campeonato de Portugal side Sacavenense in the summer of 2014. Zhou returned to Shandong Luneng and was promoted to the first team squad in 2015, acting as the fourth goalkeeper of the team.

Zhou was loaned to Super League newcomer Hebei China Fortune for one season in February 2016. He didn't appear for China Fortune throughout the entirety of his loan spell.

In July 2017, Zhou was loaned to Hong Kong Premier League side R&F. On 24 September 2017, he made his senior debut in a 2–1 loss against Lee Man in the first round of 2017–18 Senior Shield. He made his league debut on 28 October 2017 in a 2–1 away win against Yuen Long. Zhou was loaned to R&F again in September 2018. On 14 October 2020, Zhou left the club after his club's withdrawal from the HKPL in the new season.

He would join R&F's parent owned club Guangzhou City on 16 March 2021. He would be used as a reserve choice goalkeeper throughout the whole of the 2021 Chinese Super League season and did not make any appearances for them. The following season he would go on to make his debut in a Chinese FA Cup game on 16 November 2022 against Xi'an Ronghai in a 1-0 victory.

== Career statistics ==
As of 31 December 2025.

Appearances and goals by club, season and competition
| Club | Season | League | | | National Cup | | League Cup | | Continental | | Other | | Total | |
| Club | Season | Division | Apps | Goals | Apps | Goals | Apps | Goals | Apps | Goals | Apps | Goals | Apps | Goals |
|---|---|---|---|---|---|---|---|---|---|---|---|---|---|---|
| Sacavenense (loan) | 2014–15 | Campeonato de Portugal | 0 | 0 | 0 | 0 | - | | - | | - | | 0 | 0 |
| Shandong Luneng | 2015 | Chinese Super League | 0 | 0 | 0 | 0 | - | | 0 | 0 | 0 (Note: Appearances in Chinese FA Super Cup) | 0 | 0 | 0 |
| Shandong Luneng | 2017 | Chinese Super League | 0 | 0 | 0 | 0 | - | | - | | - | | 0 | 0 |
| Shandong Luneng | Total | | 0 | 0 | 0 | 0 | 0 | 0 | 0 | 0 | 0 | 0 | 0 | 0 |
| Hebei China Fortune (loan) | 2016 | Chinese Super League | 0 | 0 | 0 | 0 | - | | - | | - | | 0 | 0 |
| R&F (loan) | 2017–18 | Hong Kong Premier League | 14 | 0 | 0 | 0 | 1 (Note: Appearances in Hong Kong Senior Challenge Shield) | 0 | - | | 2 (Note: Appearances in Hong Kong Sapling Cup) | 0 | 17 | 0 |
| R&F (loan) | 2018–19 | Hong Kong Premier League | 17 | 0 | 1 | 0 | 2 | 0 | - | | 0 | 0 | 20 | 0 |
| R&F (loan) | 2019–20 | Hong Kong Premier League | 13 | 0 | 3 | 0 | 2 | 0 | - | | 1 | 0 | 11 | 0 |
| R&F (loan) | Total | | 44 | 0 | 4 | 0 | 5 | 0 | 0 | 0 | 3 | 0 | 56 | 0 |
| Guangzhou City | 2021 | Chinese Super League | 0 | 0 | 0 | 0 | - | | - | | - | | 0 | 0 |
| Guangzhou City | 2022 | Chinese Super League | 1 | 0 | 2 | 0 | - | | - | | - | | 3 | 0 |
| Guangzhou City | Total | | 1 | 0 | 2 | 0 | 0 | 0 | 0 | 0 | 0 | 0 | 3 | 0 |
| Guangzhou E-Power | 2023 | CMCL | 7 | 0 | - | | - | | - | | - | | 7 | 0 |
| Shaanxi Union | 2024 | China League Two | 24 | 0 | 1 | 0 | - | | - | | - | | 25 | 0 |
| Shaanxi Union | 2025 | China League One | 18 | 0 | 0 | 0 | - | | - | | - | | 18 | 0 |
| Shaanxi Union | Total | | 42 | 0 | 1 | 0 | 0 | 0 | 0 | 0 | 0 | 0 | 43 | 0 |
| Career total | | | 94 | 0 | 7 | 0 | 5 | 0 | 0 | 0 | 3 | 0 | 109 | 0 |
