= Berg =

Berg may refer to:

== People ==
- Berg (surname), a surname (including a list of people with the name)
- General Berg (disambiguation)
- Berg Ng (born 1960), Hong Kong actor
- Berg (footballer, born 1963), Ninimbergue dos Santos Guerra, Brazilian footballer
- Berg (footballer, born 1964), Rosemberg Barbosa, Brazilian footballer
- Berg (footballer, born 1978), Lindberg Mota da Silva, Brazilian footballer
- Berg (footballer, born 1989), Waldenberg Messias Coelho, Brazilian footballer

== Former states ==
- Berg (state), county and duchy of the Holy Roman Empire
- Grand Duchy of Berg, state of the Napoleonic period

== Places ==
=== Antarctica ===
- Berg Peak, Victoria Land
- Berg Bay, Victoria Land
- Berg Ice Stream

=== Austria ===
- Berg, Lower Austria
- Berg im Drautal, in Carinthia
- Berg bei Rohrbach, in Upper Austria
- Berg im Attergau, in Upper Austria

=== France ===
- Berg, Bas-Rhin, a municipality in the Arrondissement of Saverne
- Berg-sur-Moselle, a commune in the Moselle department

=== Germany ===
- Berg (state), a medieval territory in today's North Rhine-Westphalia
- Grand Duchy of Berg (1806–1813), created by Emperor Napoleon
- Berg, Baden-Württemberg, municipality, district of Ravensburg, Baden-Württemberg
- Berg, Upper Franconia, municipality, district of Hof, Bavaria
- Berg, Upper Palatinate, municipality, district of Neumarkt, Bavaria
- Berg, Upper Bavaria, municipality, district of Starnberg in Bavaria
  - Berg Castle (Bavaria)
- Berg im Gau, municipality, district of Neuburg-Schrobenhausen, Bavaria
  - Berg im Donaugau Abbey, a historical house of the Benedictine Order in the area of Berg im Gau
- Berg, Ahrweiler, municipality, district of Ahrweiler, Rhineland-Palatinate
- Berg, Rhein-Lahn, municipality, district of Rhein-Lahn, Rhineland-Palatinate
- Berg, Germersheim, municipality, district of Germersheim, Rhineland-Palatinate

=== Italy ===
- Berg, a frazione of the comune Lüsen in the Regione of Alto Adige

=== Luxemburg ===
- Berg, Luxembourg, a village
- Colmar-Berg, formerly "Berg"
  - Berg Castle in Colmar-Berg

=== Netherlands ===
- Berg (Valkenburg), part of Berg en Terblijt, municipality of Valkenburg, Limburg
- Berg aan de Maas, municipality of Stein, Limburg
- Berg en Dal, a village in the province of Gelderland
- Berg en Terblijt, a former village in the province of Limburg
- Berg (North Brabant)
- Berg (Margraten), a hamlet
- Berg (Meijel)

=== Norway ===
- Berg Municipality (Troms), a former municipality in Troms county
- Berg Municipality (Østfold), a former municipality in Østfold county
- Berg, Nordland, a village in Sømna Municipality in Nordland county
- Berg concentration camp, located near Tønsberg in Vestfold county
- Berg, Oslo, a borough of Oslo
- Berg (station), a metro station in Oslo
- Berg Upper Secondary School, in Oslo
- Berg skole (Trondheim), a primary school in Trondheim

=== Sweden ===
- Berg Municipality, a municipality in Jämtland County
- Berg, Åtvidaberg, a locality in Åtvidaberg Municipality in Östergötland County,
- Berg, Gävle, a locality in Gävle Municipality in Gävleborg County

=== Switzerland ===
- Berg, Thurgau
- Berg, St. Gallen
- Berg (Eggerberg)
- Berg am Irchel, Zurich

=== Elsewhere ===
- Berg, Alexandria, Virginia, United States
- Berg Lake, in British Columbia, Canada
- Berg River, Western Cape Province, South Africa
- Cape Berg, Severnaya Zemlya, Russia

== Businesses ==
- Berg Automobile Company, a former manufacturer of automobiles in Cleveland, Ohio
- Berg Propulsion, a Swedish company that makes maritime propellers
- Berg Publishers, an academic publishing company based in Oxford, England

== Other uses ==
- Berg wind, local wind in South Africa
- 4528 Berg, an asteroid
- Berg (novel), a 1964 book by Ann Quin
- Berg Fighter or Berg D.I, an Austrian single-engine, single-seater fighter biplane used in World War I
- Berg connector, a brand of electrical connector used in computer hardware
- Berg Party, a local political party in Berg, Sweden
- Berg Balance Scale, a clinical test of a person's static and dynamic balance abilities
- The Berg, a proposed artificial mountain in Berlin, Germany

== See also ==
- Berg report, published by the World Bank in 1981
- Barg (disambiguation)
- Birg (disambiguation)
- Borg (disambiguation)
- Burg (disambiguation)
- Bergen
- Bergh
