= Leung Nok Hang =

Hong Kong footballer

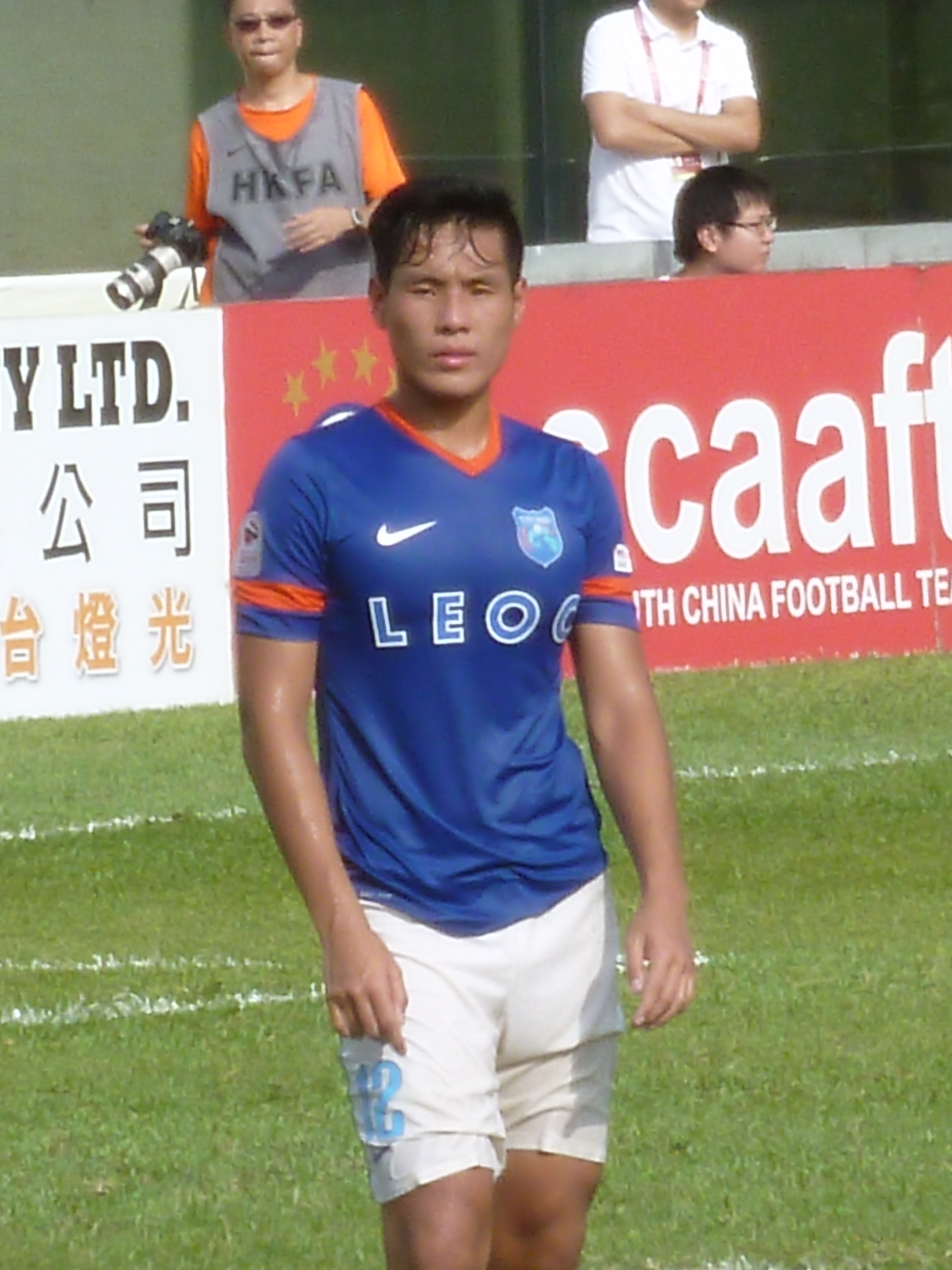

Personal information
- Full name: Jacky Leung Nok Hang
- Date of birth: 14 November 1994 (age 32)
- Place of birth: British Hong Kong
- Height: 1.87 m (6 ft 2 in)
- Position: Centre back

Team information
- Current team: Shenzhen Juniors
- Number: 24

Youth career
- 2006–2009: Eastern
- 2009–2013: Brooke House College

Senior career*
Years	Team	Apps	(Gls)
2013–2015	YFCMD	30	(2)
2015–2016	Pegasus	12	(0)
2016–2017	South China	16	(3)
2017–2018	Pegasus	11	(2)
2018–2020	R&F	24	(5)
2020	Meizhou Hakka	15	(3)
2021–2025	Zhejiang FC	121	(8)
2026–	Shenzhen Juniors	23	(0)

International career^{‡}
2014–2016	Hong Kong U-23	5	(0)
2018–	Hong Kong	14	(0)
- * Club domestic league appearances and goals as of 7 November 2026 ‡ National team caps and goals as of 31 March 2026

Jacky Leung Nok Hang (Chinese: 梁諾恆; born 14 November 1994) is a Hong Kong professional footballer who currently plays as a centre back for China League One club Shenzhen Juniors and the Hong Kong national team. He is the younger brother of current Eastern player Leung Kwun Chung.

== Club career ==
In 2010, Leung won a Dreams Come True scholarship, allowing him to complete his high school studies in Britain at the Brooke House College Football Academy with all costs covered. Leung would return to Hong Kong and joined YFCMD in 2013. He made his professional debut on 1 September 2013, in a league game against Citizen in a 1–1 draw.

Leung joined Pegasus in 2015 and would go on to establish himself as a vital member of the team that won the 2015–16 Hong Kong FA Cup and 2015–16 Hong Kong Sapling Cup. With these achievements he would join the most historically successful football club in Hong Kong, South China in 2016. Once again Leung immediately established himself as a vital member of the team, but the club finished in a disappointing fourth and the owners decided to reduce funding of the club, which saw on 5 June 2017, South China made the shocking announcement that they would voluntarily self-relegate into the First Division.

On 11 June 2017, Pegasus chairperson Canny Leung revealed that Leung and three other South China players would be jumping ship to Pegasus. After one season he would go out on trial training before officially signing with R&F on 13 August 2018.

On 1 May 2020, R&F agreed to swap Leung for Meizhou Hakka's Tsui Wang Kit. Making his debut in a league game on 13 September 2020 against Liaoning Shenyang Urban in 2–0 victory. He would go on to establish himself as a vital member of the team that finished at the time a club record high of fifth within the second tier.

On 7 January 2021, Leung was sold to Zhejiang Greentown for a fee of up to RMB $20 million (US$3 million), which is a record for a Hong Kong player. In his first season he quickly established himself as a vital member of the team as the club gained promotion to the top tier at the end of the 2021 campaign.

On 28 January 2026, Leung joined Shenzhen Juniors.

== International career ==
On 16 October 2018, Leung made his international debut for Hong Kong, coming on as an 82nd-minute substitute in a friendly match against Indonesia.

== Career statistics ==
=== Club ===
As of 26 December 2024.

Club	Season	League			National Cup		League Cup		Continental		Other		Total	
Club	Season	Division	Apps	Goals	Apps	Goals	Apps	Goals	Apps	Goals	Apps	Goals	Apps	Goals
YFCMD	2013–14	Hong Kong First Division	18	2	1	0	1 (Note: Appearances in Hong Kong Senior Challenge Shield)	0	–		0 (Note: Appearances in HKFA League Cup)	0	20	2
YFCMD	2014–15	Hong Kong Premier League	14 (Note: Includes two appearances in 2014–15 Hong Kong season play-off)	0	3	0	1	0	–		1	0	19	0
YFCMD	Total		32	2	4	0	2	0	0	0	1	0	39	2
Pegasus	2015–16	Hong Kong Premier League	13 (Note: Includes one appearances in 2015–16 Hong Kong season play-off)	0	4	0	1	0	–		2	0	20	0
South China	2016–17	Hong Kong Premier League	17 (Note: Includes one appearances in 2016–17 Hong Kong season play-off)	3	3	1	0	0	2 (Note: Appearances in AFC Cup)	0	0 (Note: Appearances in Hong Kong Sapling Cup)	0	22	4
Pegasus	2017–18	Hong Kong Premier League	11	2	1	0	0	0	–		5	0	17	2
R&F	2018–19	Hong Kong Premier League	15	3	1	0	2	1	–		0	0	18	4
R&F	2019–20	Hong Kong Premier League	9	2	2	0	2	0	–		3	1	16	3
R&F	Total		24	5	3	0	4	1	0	0	3	1	34	7
Meizhou Hakka	2020	China League One	15	3	1	0	–		–		–		16	3
Zhejiang	2021	China League One	31	1	0	0	–		–		2 (Note: Appearances in Promotion/Relegation Play-offs)	0	33	1
Zhejiang	2022	Chinese Super League	30	4	4	0	–		–		–		34	4
Zhejiang	2023	Chinese Super League	22	1	1	0	–		5 (Note: Appearances in AFC Champions League)	0	–		28	1
Zhejiang	2024	Chinese Super League	22	2	0	0	–		2 (Note: Appearances in AFC Champions League Two)	0	–		24	2
Zhejiang	Total		105	8	5	0	0	0	7	0	2	0	119	8
Career total			217	23	21	1	7	1	9	0	13	1	266	26

=== International ===
As of 31 March 2026

National team	Year	Apps	Goals
Hong Kong	2018	1	0
Hong Kong	2019	4	0
Hong Kong	2020	0	0
Hong Kong	2021	0	0
Hong Kong	2022	0	0
Hong Kong	2023	8	0
Hong Kong	2024	0	0
Hong Kong	2025	0	0
Hong Kong	2026	1	0
Total		14	0

== Honours ==
=== Club ===
Pegasus

- Hong Kong FA Cup: 2015–16
- Hong Kong Sapling Cup: 2015–16
