= Barg =

Barg may refer to:

== People ==
- Thorsten Barg (born 1986), German football player
- Benjamin Barg (born 1984), German football player

== Places ==
- Barg, Iran, a village
- Barg, South Khorasan, Iran, a village

== Other uses ==
- Kabab barg, Persian-style barbecued lamb, chicken or beef kebab
- bar(g), barg or BarG, a variation of the bar unit for gauge pressure

== See also ==
- Barag (disambiguation)
- Berg (disambiguation)
- Birg (disambiguation)
- Borg (disambiguation)
- Burg (disambiguation)
