= Lagos Plan of Action =

The Lagos Plan of Action (officially the Lagos Plan of Action for the Economic Development of Africa, 1980–2000) was an Organisation of African Unity-backed plan to increase Africa's self-sufficiency. The plan aimed to minimize Africa's links with Western countries by maximizing Africa's own resources.

== History ==
It was drafted in Lagos, Nigeria in April 1980, during a conference which included a variety of African leaders. The plan blamed Africa's economic crisis on the Structural Adjustment Programs of the World Bank and International Monetary Fund and the vulnerability of African economies to worldwide economic shocks, such as the 1973 oil crisis. It has been characterized as the collective response of African states to the growing reliance of Western economies on the ideology of neoliberalism, which was summed up in the World Bank's 1981 Berg report, which replaced the LPA as the guiding economic document for Africa in the 1980s.

The report claimed that development in Africa could be achieved by a decreased reliance on raw material extraction, industrialization, global equality in trade relations and an increase in development aid from the international community. Africanist scholars noted the absence in the report of any blame on, or calls for reform of, domestic governments of Africa. This contrasts significantly with the Berg Report, which apportioned blame solely on the Africa leaders themselves, with the international community taking no responsibility for their part in Africa's demise.

== Structure ==
=== Food and agriculture ===
The Lagos Plan of Action acknowledged the dismal state of Africa's food production and consumption. The plan also highlighted a main cause of the problem with Africa's food production to be the lack of proper attention and resources to rural life. The plan stressed that "the development of agriculture should not be considered in isolation but integrated within the economic and social development process". The plan felt the need to integrate the youth into agriculture and shift the urbanization trend by introducing policy changes to make rural life more lucrative was an important part of agricultural development in Africa. The plan proposed that, from 1980 to 1985, Africa focus on establishing the "foundation of self-sufficiency" and the "immediate improvement in the food situation." The plan also highlighted high priority issues such as reducing food waste, increasing food security, and increasing and diversifying the food supply while proposing urgent measures for all.

The Lagos Plan of Action called for "significant progress" to be made towards achieving a "50% reduction in post-harvest food losses." Some of the recommended actions to achieve this included educating the public of food waste reduction through mass media campaigns, building appropriate facilities for food storage and transport, and creation of national policies for food loss reduction. To increase food security, the LPA aimed to set up national food reserves at 10% of the total population for all member states. The LPA also called for a "coherent national food security policy" with "concrete actions" for each member state. The LPA recommended for the proper research to be done to improve food transportation and distribution throughout Africa. The main objective the plan called for was for measurable "improvements in food-crop production with a view to replacing a size-able proportion of the presently imported products".

=== Industry ===
The LPA acknowledged that Africa was heading into the 1980-90 decade as the "least developed region in the world" as the effect of colonization and proclaimed the years 1980–1990 as the "Industrial Development Decade in Africa." Due to resource limitations faced by African states, the LPA encouraged "industrial co-operation" between Member States in order to strengthen industrialization in Africa. Member states felt they were owed a "massive and appropriate contribution" from developed countries for African development. The plan also called for an industrial base in each Member state for African social and economic development.

By the year 2000, the Lagos Plan aimed for Africa to have "2% of the world industrial production" and recognized the need for the creation of a national industrial structure to achieve that goal. The plan also emphasized the importance for cooperation between industry sectors for success in the long term. From 1980 to 1990, the plan aimed for Africa to have "1.4% of the world industrial production" while achieving self-sufficiency in food, building materials, clothing, and energy". In the short term, the plan aimed to have "at least 1% of the world industrial production" and start the foundational process for achieving self-reliance in the long run. The plan called for research to be conducted to determine which industry sectors could be developed in the short term and to learn which industries required regional and national support for development.

=== Natural resources ===
The Lagos Plan of Action stated that the main problems confronting Africa in natural resource development included lack of information, lack of adequate capital, and excessive foreign dependence. The plan states the strategies for natural resource development in the 1980s should assess natural resource endowment, integrate natural resource development, strengthen existing natural resources, and work in close integration with the international community.

The plan recommended that a member states gain a thorough understanding of their existing natural resources, conduct research, and store collected data in a national data bank. The rational development and utilization of member state's natural resources as well as conservation of natural resources was recommended. The main objectives for mineral resource development concerned gaining a better understanding of Africa's mineral resources. The plan called for the establishment of a National Water Committee by 1980, strengthening of existing sub-regional organizations, properly identify water supply and irrigation projects, and increased cooperation in the development of water resources. With regards to mapping and cartography, Member states should "provide means to establish and strengthen national surveying and mapping institutions" and place an important emphasis on the development of national surveying and mapping institutions".

=== Human resource development and utilization ===
The Lagos Plan of Action identified Africa's human resources as one of its greatest asset. It also repeatedly acknowledged the lack of adequately trained human resources and called for the full utilization of its labor force as necessary for the continent's development. The plan called for scientific and technical skills to be emphasized in order to reduce Africa's reliance on imported scientific and technical manpower. At the National Level, increasing national training and manpower development as well as maintaining a "centrally administered Training Fund" was deemed essential. The creation and maintenance of Training Programs throughout Member States was to be funded by this Training Fund. Adoption of policies and measures to ensure the reduction of foreign dependence on was important. At the Regional and Sub-regional levels, the plan called for "manpower studies"/research to be carried out to "provide guidelines for formulation and initiation of training programs at the national levels". Also the plan stressed the value of supporting the "free movement of labor within sub-regions" to "facilitate employment of surplus trained manpower" to other Member countries in need. The minimum budget for the human resource initiatives detailed in the Plan required $1.5 million per year. The Plan advised Member States that international aid for human resource development is "welcome and supplementary to the African self-reliant effort".

=== Science and technology ===
In regards to science and technology, the Lagos Plan of Action called for increased training, funding and research to be conducted in preparing trained human capital and raising the standard of living. The Lagos Plan of Action recognized that despite past efforts, Africa was in need of science and technology development. The plan called for member states to hold science and technology fairs on a regular basis to encourage the exchange of knowledge between African scientists. The plan also called for a centralized "Centre for Science and Technology for Development" in each member state to serve as the operational structure for development. The development of human resources trained in science and technology and the creation of a competitive research environment was deemed vital. The plan identified priority areas for technological innovation in food and agriculture such as improving seeds, storage/processing techniques, irrigation technology and more. For the industrial sectors, the plan identified priority areas for scientific and technological innovation such as the food and agro-industries, the building and construction industries, the metal, engineering, chemical and forest-based industries.

=== Transport and communication ===
The Lagos Plan of Action recognized that transport and communication play an important role for Africa. The Economic Commission for Africa Conference of Ministers called for a "Decade for Transport and Communications in 1979". The plan calls for the "promotion of transport and communication with a focus on increasing intra-African trade". It was decided that the decade would be implemented in two phases and with "regional, sub-regional and national projects with a sub-regional impact." Both phases involved the continuation of ongoing projects, implementation of already financed projects and gather financing for future projects. There were 450 transport projects and 100 communications projects ready for the first phase with a total cost of US$8.85 billion.

=== Trade and finance ===
The Lagos Plan of Action called for the creation of an African Common Market and the improvement of domestic trade at both national and regional levels throughout Africa. Intra-African trade expansion was encouraged through the means of reduction of trade barriers, mechanisms for the development of trade, and the establishment of African multinational production corporations and joint ventures. Internationally, the plan called for Africa's world industrial production to reach 2% by the year 2000. The plan also called for new financial policies at the national level and regional levels to encourage trade and financial cooperation among member states.

=== Measures to build up and strengthen economic and technical co-operation ===
Africa's need for institutions that help develop capabilities and infrastructures essential for economic and social development was recognized by the Lagos Plan. Existing institutions have faced stifled growth due to the lack of governmental support. The plan aimed to set guidelines around the creation of future multinational institutions to ensure that future institutions would be supported and their need has been required.

=== Environment and development ===
The Lagos Plan of Action identified environmental development as a "priority areas of environmental concern requiring immediate action" with action required regarding: (a.) Maintaining safe drinking-water supplies and environmental sanitation; (b.) Desertification and drought; (c.) Reforestation and soil degradation; (d.) Marine Pollution and conservation of marine resources; (e.) Human settlements; (f.) Mining; (g.) Air Pollution Control; (g.) Environmental education and training, legislation, and information. The Lagos Plan stressed the need for the creation of an environmental matters intergovernmental committee as well as the cooperation of member states for the progression of Africa's environmental development.

=== The least developed African countries ===
The Lagos Plan accepts the conclusions of the Conference of African Least Developed Countries in 1980 on the issues facing the least developed countries. It was recognized that these countries were facing similar problems that required collective and similar solutions. The plan also aimed to develop these countries in an effort to achieve sustainability through increased Official development assistance. The creation of a Conference of Minister of African Least Developed Countries was called for as well as increased projection models for the least developed countries.

=== Energy ===
The Lagos Plan of Action declared the African energy situation to be disturbing and rising at a rate that should cause serious concern. With consumption of Energy increasing at a rate that causes concern for the continent's energy supplies, the lack of an African national energy policy in most African countries was a major problem. The plan identified the need to diversify energy sources, the lack of funding, limited manpower, and the lack of standardization in the energy sector. In the long term, the plan recommended exploring fossil fuels, hydropower, nuclear power, and new and renewable energy sources.

=== Women and development ===
The Lagos Plan of Action called for the full integration of women into development planning. The plan stated that any actions made for the development of women's status in Africa so far have failed to be adequate. The plan stressed the importance of integrating women into all sectors of development within Africa and not treating the process as separate from Africa's development as a whole. The plan aimed to give women the "right to higher education, technical education, and management skills" allowing women to "participate more fully in economic and political life". The plan called for the "reduction of domestic burden of rural women" and for "steps to be taken to include women in higher administrative and policy-making levels". For the years 1980–1985, the plan chose specific sectors to focus on. These included organizational machineries, education and training, employment, communications and mass media, health, nutrition, and family life, research, data collection and analysis, and lastly legislative and administrative matters.

=== Development planning, statistics and population ===
The Lagos Plan recognized the lack of a necessary and proper implementation plan to carry out many national objections. To achieve its goals of self-sufficiency and reduced foreign reliance, African Member States had to improve its capabilities to execute the implementation plan. The creation of statistical programs to aid with national development as well as improved population and demographic data collection techniques were called for by the plan.

== Results of the Lagos Plan of Action ==
The Lagos Plan aimed to fix a large number of problems and faced an uphill battle of achieving its goals. At the Eleventh meeting of the Conference of African Ministers of Trade in April 1991, the Economic Commission for Africa gave their review of the impact of the Lagos Plan. This meeting looked at the developments of trade domestically and the effects of that development on African member states. The lack of an "effective monitoring mechanism" may explain why there is lack of enforcement by some member states. The lack of collected data also impacted attempts at analysis of aspects of the Lagos Plan of Action. Trade was impacted by natural disasters, such as drought in 34 African countries in the 1980s, and, in 1990, trade in Africa was behind most other regions. Trade barriers were also found to still exist between African states where they should not have by 1990. An area of progress was institution-building despite lack of proper funding.

== See also ==
- Economy of Africa
- Structural adjustment
- Economic Development
