= Jakob Tigges =

German architect and academic

Jakob Tigges is a German architect and academic "who became known through a series of artistic and provocative urban design proposals". In 2009, Tigges proposed construction of the world's largest artificial mountain, The Berg, at the site of Berlin's former Berlin Tempelhof Airport. In 2010, Tigges designed a Chicago project, ChicagoSkyScrapesBack. In 2011, his office Mila won a competition for the new exhibition of architecture at the Ethnological Museum of Berlin and Museum of Asian Art. for a proposal that displays exhibited objects hovering through the city castle’s rooms in subtle opposition to the static nature of the reconstructed architecture all around. Tigges' work overcomes the disciplinary boundaries between art, architecture and communication and have been awarded with prestigious prizes within different disciplines.
