= Berg, Margraten =

Berg
- Hamlet
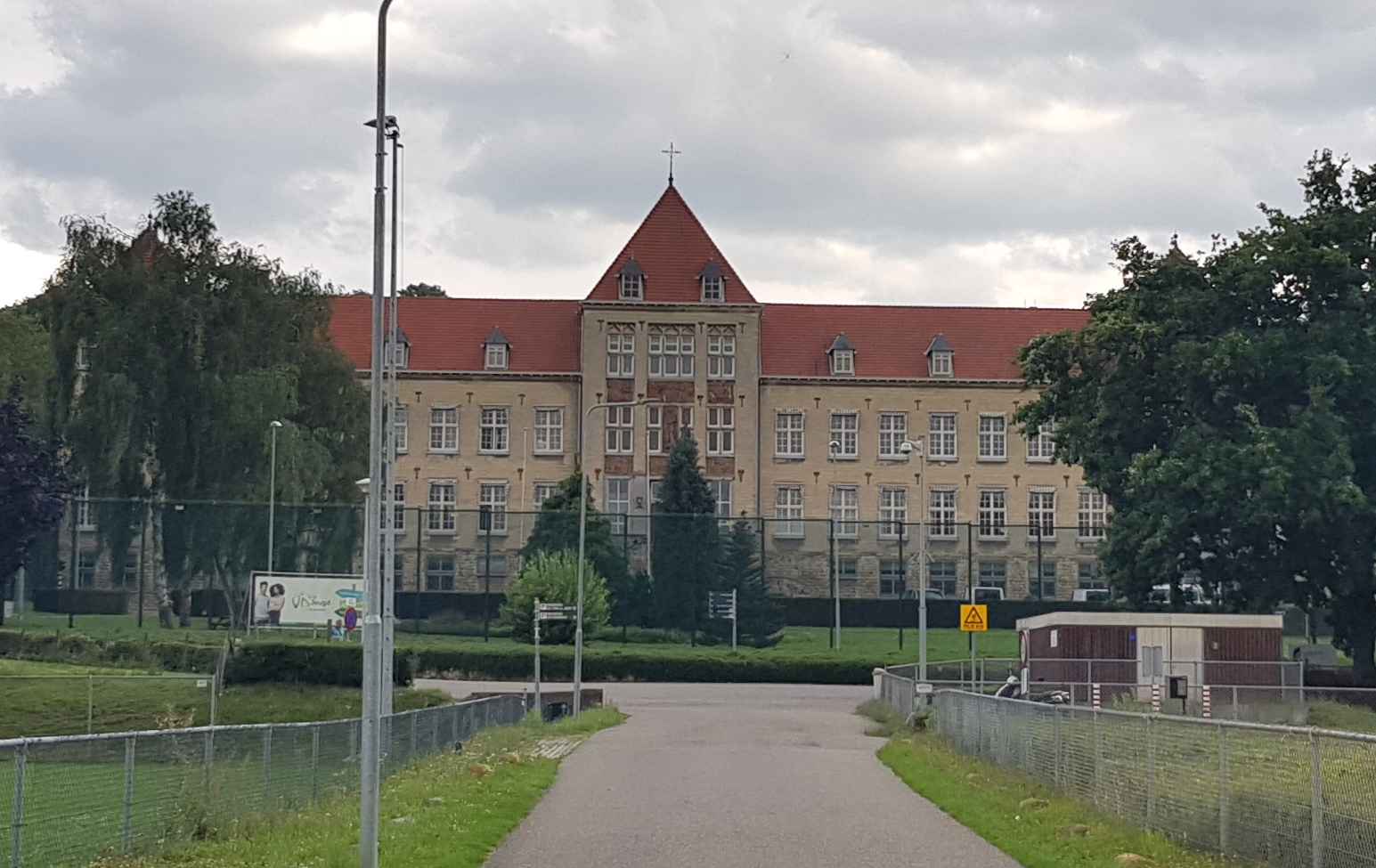
- Sint-Jozef detention center

- Location in the Netherlands Location in the province of Limburg in the Netherlands
- Coordinates: 50°50′23″N 5°44′53″E
- Country: Netherlands
- Province: Limburg
- Municipality: Eijsden-Margraten

Area
  - Total: 0.61 km^{2} (0.24 sq mi)
- Elevation: 127 m (417 ft)

Population (135)
  - Total: 1,015
  - Density: 1,700/km^{2} (4,300/sq mi)
- Time zone: UTC+1 (CET)
  - Summer (DST): UTC+2 (CEST)
- Postal code: 6267
- Dialing code: 043

Berg (Dutch pronunciation: [ˈbɛr(ə)x]; Limburgish: [ˈbæʀ(ə)x]) is a hamlet in the Dutch province of Limburg. It is located in the municipality of Eijsden-Margraten, on the road between Maastricht and Margraten.

Berg has a population of about 150, more than 90% of which are males, and 63% of which are between 15 and 25 years old. Most of these are adolescents in a youth detention center in Huize St. Joseph. The building was originally an orphanage.

Berg should not be confused with the village of the same name 3 km to the northeast.

Berg has no place name signs. There is a war memorial for eleven members of the Belgian resistance and an unidentified Russian. They were held captive in Sint Joseph. On 12 September 1944, the American army neared the village and the 12 men were executed.

== Gallery ==
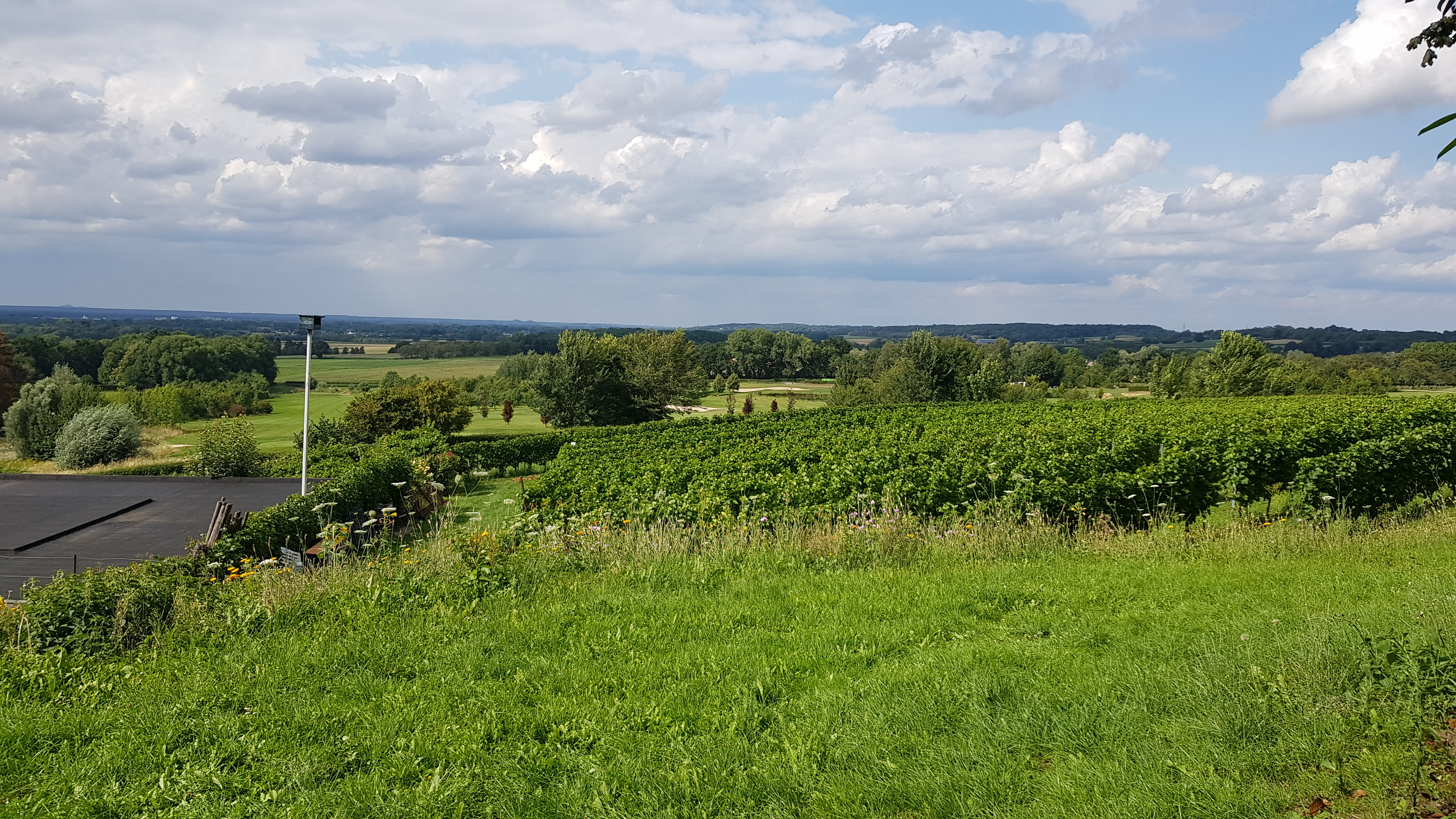
Landscape near Berg

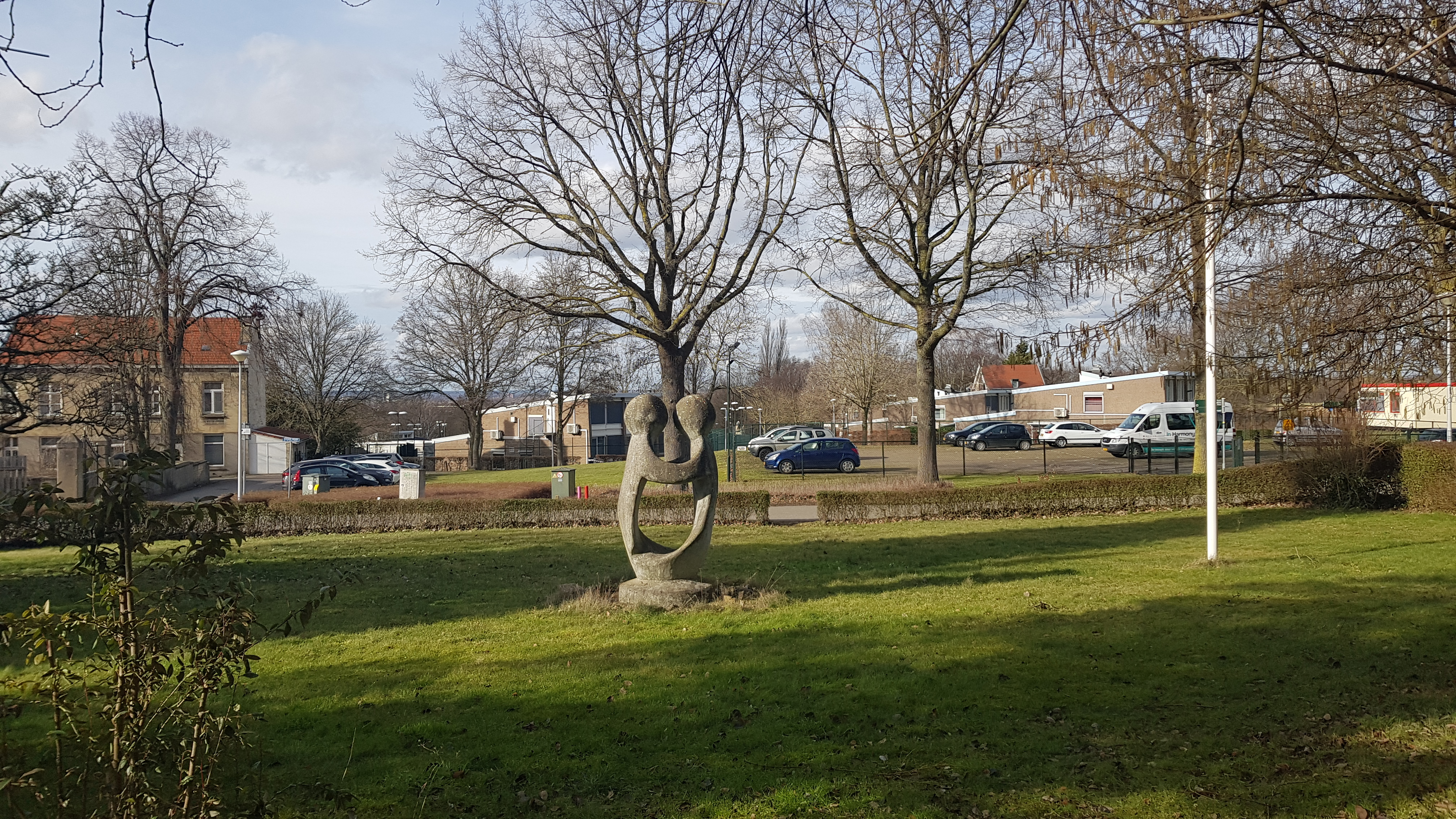
Statue

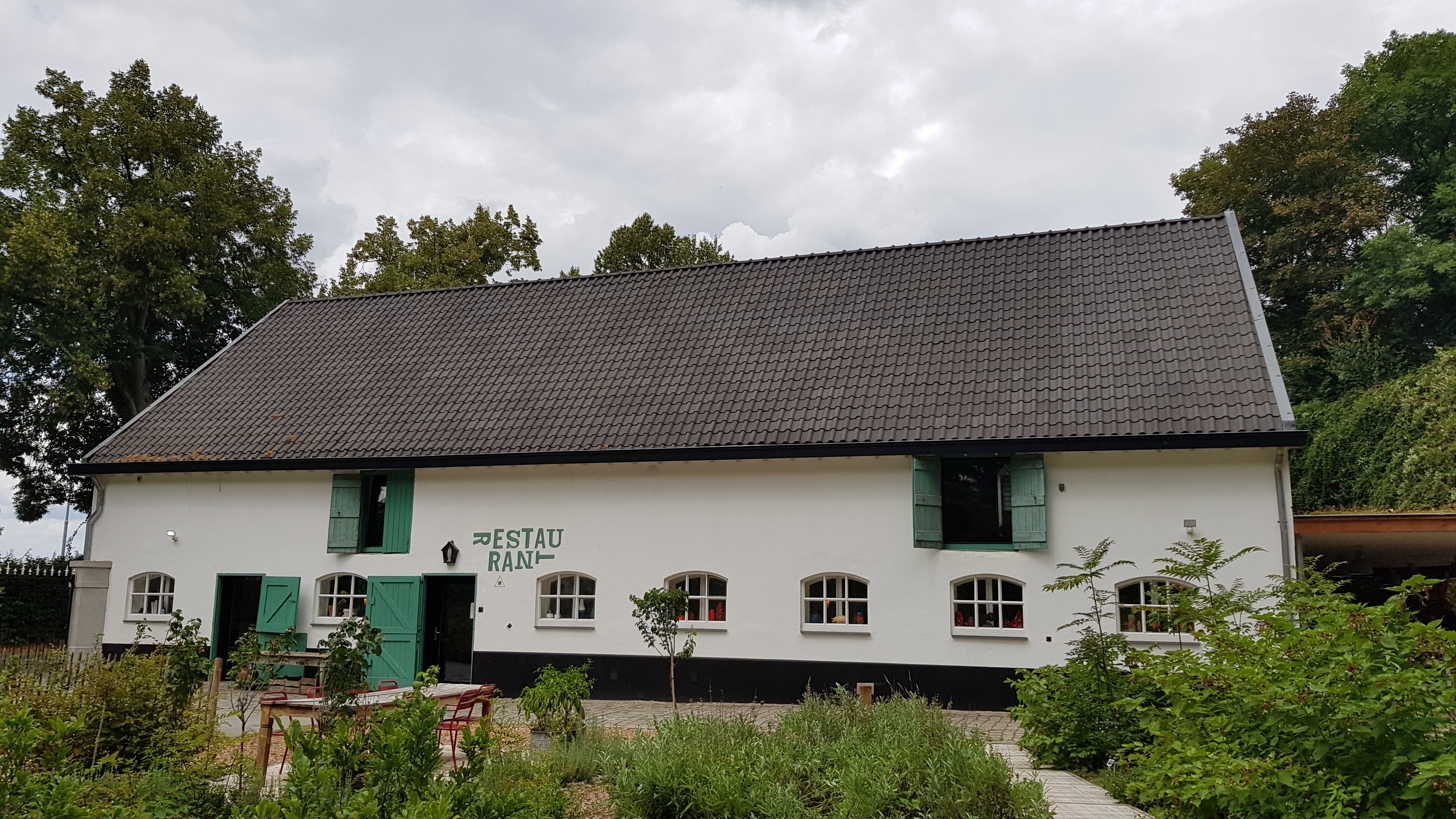
Restaurant
