= Kim Bong-jin =

South Korean footballer

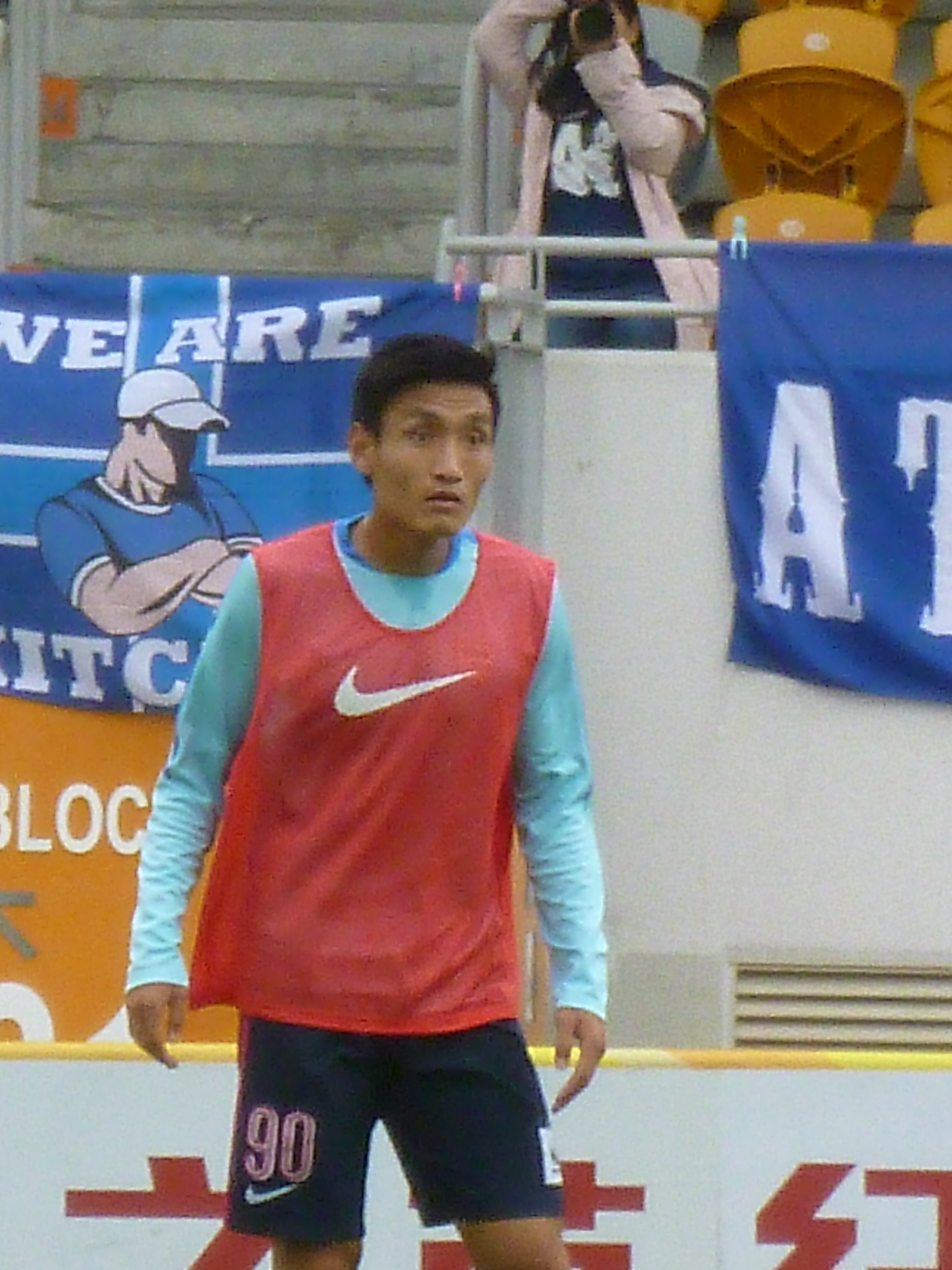

Personal information
- Full name: Kim Bong-Jin
- Date of birth: 18 July 1990 (age 36)
- Place of birth: Seoul, South Korea
- Height: 1.83 m (6 ft 0 in)
- Positions: Defensive midfielder; central midfielder

Youth career
- 2006–2008: Kwangwoon Electronics Technical High School
- 2008–2012: Dong-eui University

Senior career*
Years	Team	Apps	(Gls)
2013–2014	Gangwon	12	(2)
2014	Incheon United	18	(0)
2015–2016	Gyeongnam	24	(5)
2016–2019	Kitchee	38	(1)
2019	→ Hoàng Anh Gia Lai (loan)	19	(1)
2020	Petaling Jaya City	9	(0)
2021	Gwangju	17	(0)
2022	Nakhon Si United	3	(0)
2023–2024	PSIM Yogyakarta	9	(0)
2025	North Bangkok University	6	(0)
- * Club domestic league appearances and goals as of 6 February 2026

- Kim Bong-jin
- Hangul: 김봉진
- Hanja: 金奉珍
- RR: Gim Bongjin
- MR: Kim Pongjin

Kim Bong-jin (Korean: 김봉진; born 18 July 1990 in Seoul) is a South Korean professional footballer who plays as a defensive midfielder or central midfielder.

== Style of play ==
He is a versatile midfielder and can play as defensive midfielder or central midfielder.

== Club career ==
=== Kitchee ===
On 7 February 2017, Kim Bong-jin scored the equalizer for Kitchee against Ulsan Hyundai in the 2017 AFC Champions League qualifying play-off.

==== Hoang Anh Gia Lai (loan) ====
In December 2018, Kitchee announced that they will be loaning Bong-Jin to Hoang Anh Gia Lai.

At the end of the 2019 V.League 1, Hoang Anh Gia Lai terminated its contract with Bong-jin.

=== Petaling Jaya City ===
Kim Bong-jin joined Petaling Jaya City of the Malaysian Super League for the 2020 season, after visiting Malaysia on vacation.

== Career statistics ==
As of 3 February 2024

Appearances and goals by club, season and competition
Club	Season	League			Cup		Continental		Other		Total	
Club	Season	Division	Apps	Goals	Apps	Goals	Apps	Goals	Apps	Goals	Apps	Goals
Gangwon	2013	K League 1	12	2	1	0	—		1	0	14	2
Incheon United	2014	K League 1	0	0	1	0	—		—		1	0
Gyeongnam FC	2015	K League 2	7	0	0	0	—		—		7	0
Kitchee	2016–17	Hong Kong Premier League	19	0	3	0	2	1	4	0	28	1
Kitchee	2017–18	Hong Kong Premier League	13	0	3	0	6	0	6	0	28	0
Kitchee	2018–19	Hong Kong Premier League	6	1	—		—		2	0	8	0
Kitchee	Total		38	1	6	0	8	1	12	0	64	1
Hoàng Anh Gia Lai (loan)	2019	V.League 1	20	1	0	0	—		—		20	1
Petaling Jaya City	2020	Malaysia Super League	9	0	—		—		—		9	0
Gwangju FC	2021	K League 1	17	0	1	0	—		—		18	0
Nakhon Si United	2022–23	Thai League 2	3	0	1	0	—		—		4	0
PSIM Yogyakarta	2023–24	Liga 2	9	0	0	0	—		—		9	0
Career total			115	4	10	0	8	1	13	0	146	4

== Honours ==
Kitchee

- Hong Kong Premier League: 2016–17, 2017–18
- Hong Kong Senior Shield: 2016–17
- Hong Kong FA Cup: 2016–17, 2017–18
- Hong Kong Sapling Cup: 2017–18
- Hong Kong Community Cup: 2016–17, 2017–18
