= 2016–17 Hong Kong Premier League =

Hong Kong Premier League
- Season: 2016–17
- Champions: Kitchee
- Relegated: South China; HKFC
- AFC Champions League: Kitchee; Eastern
- Matches: 110
- Goals: 377 (3.43 per match)
- Top goalscorer: (Hong Kong) Sandro (Kitchee) (21 goals)
- Best goalkeeper: Yapp Hung Fai (Eastern)
- Biggest home win: Kitchee 10–0 HKFC (7 April 2017)
- Biggest away win: HKFC 0–6 Southern (3 February 2017)
- Highest scoring: Kitchee 10–0 HKFC (7 April 2017)
- Longest winning run: 8 matches: Kitchee
- Longest unbeaten run: 19 matches: Eastern
- Longest winless run: 12 matches: Biu Chun Glory Sky
- Longest losing run: 10 matches: HKFC
- Highest attendance: 6,413; Eastern 1–4 Kitchee (6 May 2017)
- Lowest attendance: 100; R&F 0–3 Rangers (6 May 2017)
- Total attendance: 101,222
- Average attendance: 920

2016–17 Hong Kong Premier League (also known as BOC Life Hong Kong Premier League for sponsorship reasons) was the 3rd season of Hong Kong Premier League, the top division of Hong Kong football. The season was won by Kitchee. Kitchee forward Sandro was the top goalscorer with 21 goals. South China and HKFC were relegated to the Hong Kong First Division.

== Teams ==
A total of 11 teams will contest the league, including seven sides from the 2015–16 Hong Kong Premier League, two promoted from the 2015–16 Hong Kong First Division League and two new teams.

=== Stadia and locations ===
Locations of the 2016-17 Hong Kong Premier League clubs

Primary venues used in the Hong Kong Premier League:

Eastern Kitchee	South China	Southern	Pegasus
Mong Kok Stadium	Tseung Kwan O Sports Ground	Aberdeen Sports Ground	Hong Kong Stadium
Capacity: 6,664	Capacity: 3,500	Capacity: 4,000	Capacity: 40,000
Yuen Long	Rangers	Tai Po	HKFC
Yuen Long Stadium	Tsing Yi Sports Ground	Tai Po Sports Ground	HKFC Stadium
Capacity: 5,000	Capacity: 1,500	Capacity: 3,200	Capacity: 2,750
Biu Chun Glory Sky	(China) R&F		
Hammer Hill Road Sports Ground	Siu Sai Wan Sports Ground		
Capacity: 2,200	Capacity: 11,981		

Remarks:
^{1}The capacity of Aberdeen Sports Ground reduces from 9,000 to 4,000 as only the main stand is opened for football matches.

=== Personnel and Kits ===
Team	Chairman	Head coach	Captain	Kitmaker	Shirt sponsor
Biu Chun Glory Sky	Brian Leung	(South Korea) Yoon Dong-hun	Mirko Teodorović	Kelme	Glory Sky Finance
Eastern	Peter Leung	Chan Yuen-ting	Yapp Hung Fai	Adidas	SMI Corporation
HKFC	(England) Tony Sealy	(England) Richard Ewart	(Hungary) Gergely Ghéczy	Adidas	The Executive Center (Front)
Pegasus	Canny Leung	(England) Kevin Bond	(North Macedonia) Kristijan Naumovski	Adidas	ZTE
Kitchee	Ken Ng	Chu Chi Kwong	Lo Kwan Yee	Nike	Jockey Club Kitchee Centre (Front); WWF (Shorts)
Rangers	Fung Ka Ki	Lam Hing Lun	(Spain) Jordi Tarrés	Xtep	Lee & Man Chemical
Southern	Chan Man Chun	Cheng Siu Chung	Leung Tsz Chun	Nike	Isuzu (Front); Kwoon Chung Motors (Back)
South China	Wallace Cheung	(Serbia) Dejan Antonić	Chan Wai Ho	Adidas	AET (Front)
Tai Po	Cheung Hok-ming	Lee Chi Kin	Chan Yuk Chi	Nike	Lee Kee Group (Back)
Yuen Long	Wong Wai Shun	Tsang Chiu Tat	(Brazil) Fábio Lopes	Lotto	KMB (Front)
(China) R&F	(China) Huang Shenghua	(China) Li Zhihai	(China) Tu Dongxu	Xtep	R&F Princess Cove (Front)

=== Managerial Changes ===
Team	Outgoing manager	Manner of departure	Date of vacancy	Position in table	Incoming manager	Date of appointment
Biu Chun Glory Sky	Chiu Chung Man	Promoted as General Manager	4 October 2016	7th	(South Korea) Yoon Dong-hun	4 October 2016
South China	(Brazil) Ricardo	Return as Coach	25 October 2016	4th	(Serbia) Dejan Antonić	31 October 2016
Pegasus	(Republic of Ireland) Steve Gallen	Mutual consent	3 November 2016	4th	(England) Kevin Bond	7 November 2016

=== Foreign Players ===
The number of foreign players is restricted to six (including an Asian player) per team, with no more than four on pitch during matches. Non-Chinese/Hong Kong player could not be registered in R&F as one of the participating conditions of the China-based club. Moreover, R&F need to have at least eight Hong Kong players in the squad.

Club	Player 1	Player 2	Player 3	Player 4	Player 5	Asian Player
Biu Chun Glory Sky	(Brazil) Everton Camargo	(Serbia) Igor Miović	(Serbia) Mirko Teodorović	(South Korea) Lee Kil-hoon	(Ukraine) Oleksiy Shlyakotin	(South Korea) Yoon Dong-hun
Eastern	(Brazil) Diego Eli	(Brazil) Giovane	(Brazil) Michel Lugo	(Croatia) Miroslav Saric	(Spain) Manuel Bleda	(Australia) Josh Mitchell
HKFC	(England) Andrew Wylde	(England) Thomas Smith	(France) Jerome De Clarens	(Hungary) Gergely Ghéczy	(Japan) Issey Maholo	(Japan) Shunsuke Nakamura
Pegasus	(Brazil) João Emir	(Brazil) Dhiego Martins	(Brazil) Eduardo Praes	(North Macedonia) Kristijan Naumovski	(Spain) Salva Chamorro	(Australia) Travis Major
Kitchee	(Brazil) Fernando	(Hungary) Krisztián Vadócz	(South Korea) Kim Dong-jin	(Spain) Dani	(Spain) Rufino	(South Korea) Kim Bong-jin
Rangers	(Brazil) Berg	(Brazil) Clayton	(Brazil) Denis	(Spain) Fernando Recio	(Spain) Jordi Tarrés	(South Korea) Gee Kyung-hun
Southern	(Brazil) Tomas	(Brazil) Wellingsson	(Spain) Dieguito	(Spain) Marcos Jiménez	(Spain) Diego Garrido	(Japan) Tomoya Uchida
South China	(Brazil) Luiz Carlos	(Cameroon) Mahama Awal	(Serbia) Nikola Komazec	(Serbia) Bojan Mališić	(Serbia) Marko Perović	(Japan) Yusuke Kato
Tai Po	(Brazil) Paulo César	(Brazil) Dudu	(Brazil) David Lazari	(Brazil) Lima	(Brazil) Lucas Silva	(Japan) Yuto Nakamura
Yuen Long	(Brazil) Diego Higino	(Brazil) Stefan	(Brazil) Luciano Silva	(Brazil) Ticão	(Serbia) Aleksandar Ranđelović	

Club	HK Player 1	HK Player 2	HK Player 3	HK Player 4	HK Player 5	HK Player 6	HK Player 7	HK Player 8
(China) R&F	Chen Liming	Chuck Yiu Kwok	Jing Teng	Lam Hin Ting	Lam Wan Kit	Lau Tak Yan	Liang Zicheng	Tsang Kin Fong

== League table ==
Pos	Team	Pld	W	D	L	GF	GA	GD	Pts	Qualification or relegation
1	Kitchee (C)	20	16	3	1	54	8	+46	51	Qualification to Champions League group stage
2	Eastern	20	15	4	1	60	25	+35	49	Qualification to Champions League preliminary round 2 and season play-off
3	Southern	20	10	6	4	48	21	+27	36	Qualification to season play-off
4	South China (R)	20	11	2	7	34	26	+8	35	Qualification to season play-off and relegation to First Division (Note: South China did not apply for the next season's Hong Kong Premier League Licence.)
5	Yuen Long	20	9	4	7	36	23	+13	31	Qualification to season play-off
6	Tai Po	20	9	4	7	29	21	+8	31	
7	Rangers	20	7	5	8	31	33	−2	26	
8	Pegasus	20	7	5	8	35	35	0	26	
9	Biu Chun Glory Sky	20	2	4	14	24	55	−31	10	
10	(China) R&F	20	3	1	16	13	53	−40	10	
11	HKFC (R)	20	2	0	18	13	77	−64	6	Relegation to First Division

Updated to match(es) played on 6 May 2017. Source: Hong Kong Football Association
Rules for classification: 1) Points; 2) Head-to-head points; 3) Head-to-head goal difference; 4) Head-to-head goals scored; 5) Goal difference; 6) Goals scored; 7) Fair-play points; 8) Drawing lots (Play-off if the winner has to be decided)
(C) Champions; (R) Relegated

== Positions by Round ==
To preserve the chronological order of events, any postponed matches are not included to the round at which they were originally scheduled, but added to the full round they were played immediately afterwards. For example, if a match is scheduled for round 7, but then played between rounds 8 and 9, it will be added to the standings for round 8.

Team ╲ Round	1	2	3	4	5	6	7	8	9	10	11	12	13	14	15	16	17	18	19	20	21	22
Kitchee	2	1	1	1	1	1	2	2	2	2	1	1	2	2	2	2	2	2	2	2	2	1
Eastern	3	3	2	2	2	2	1	1	1	1	2	2	1	1	1	1	1	1	1	1	1	2
Southern	10	9	9	11	11	8	8	8	7	8	7	6	5	5	4	5	5	3	3	3	3	3
South China	3	5	2	2	4	4	3	3	4	3	3	4	4	3	5	4	3	4	4	4	4	4
Yuen Long	1	4	5	5	5	5	5	4	3	4	4	3	3	4	3	3	4	5	5	5	5	5
Tai Po	9	6	7	6	6	6	7	5	5	5	5	5	6	6	6	6	6	6	6	6	6	6
Rangers	5	7	8	10	10	7	6	7	8	6	8	8	7	7	8	7	8	8	8	8	8	7
Pegasus	5	2	4	4	3	3	4	6	6	7	6	7	8	8	7	8	7	7	7	7	7	8
Biu Chun Glory Sky	8	10	6	7	7	9	9	9	9	9	10	10	10	10	10	10	11	10	10	10	10	9
R&F	7	8	10	9	8	10	10	10	10	10	9	9	9	9	9	9	9	9	9	9	9	10
HKFC	11	11	11	8	9	11	11	11	11	11	11	11	11	11	11	11	10	11	11	11	11	11

Leader - 2018 AFC Champions League group stage
Relegation to 2017–18 Hong Kong First Division League

Source: Hong Kong Football Association website

== Results ==
Home \ Away	BGS	EAS	CLU	PEG	KCS	KIT	LMR	SCA	TPO	YLF	R&F
Biu Chun Glory Sky		1–2	2–3	2–4	0–4	1–5	2–2	0–3	3–3	2–3	2–0
Eastern	6–2		7–0	2–1	3–1	1–4	2–1	4–3	1–0	2–0	6–1
HKFC	1–4	0–4		0–1	0–6	0–2	0–1	1–6	1–2	0–3	3–4
Pegasus	2–1	3–5	5–0		0–0	1–3	2–3	2–1	1–1	2–2	1–2
Southern	6–0	1–3	7–0	4–3		1–0	3–3	1–0	2–0	1–1	3–2
Kitchee	0–0	0–0	10–0	2–0	3–1		5–1	1–1	1–0	2–0	5–0
Rangers	5–2	3–3	1–0	1–1	1–1	0–1		0–1	0–1	1–2	1–0
South China	1–0	2–2	4–0	0–2	2–1	0–3	2–4		1–4	1–0	1–0
Tai Po	1–0	1–1	1–2	5–1	0–0	0–1	3–0	1–2		0–3	2–1
Yuen Long	4–0	1–2	6–2	0–0	0–0	1–4	2–0	0–1	0–2		4–0
R&F	0–0	0–4	1–0	1–3	0–5	0–2	0–3	0–2	0–2	1–4	

Updated to match(es) played on 10 June 2017. Source: Hong Kong Football Association
Legend: Blue = home team win; Yellow = draw; Red = away team win.

== Season statistics ==
=== Scoring ===
==== Top Scorer ====
As of match played 6 May 2017

Rank	Player	Club	Goals
1	Sandro	Kitchee	21
2	(Spain) Manuel Bleda	Eastern	16
3	(Serbia) Nikola Komazec	South China	13
3	(Spain) Jordi Tarrés	Rangers	13
5	(Brazil) Lucas Silva	Tai Po	11
6	(Brazil) Giovane	Eastern	10
6	(Brazil) Everton	Biu Chun Glory Sky	10
8	(Spain) Rufino	Kitchee	9
8	(Spain) Marcos	Southern	9
10	Lee Hong Lim	Eastern	8

=== Hat-tricks ===
Player	For	Against	Result	Date	Ref
(Brazil) Wellingsson	Southern	HKFC	7-0	22 October 2016	
(Spain) Manuel Bleda^{4}	Eastern	Biu Chun Glory Sky	6-2	2 November 2016	
(Brazil) Stefan Pereira	Yuen Long	Biu Chun Glory Sky	4–0	19 November 2016	
(Brazil) Everton Camargo	Biu Chun Glory Sky	HKFA	4–1	17 March 2017	
Sandro	Kitchee	Rangers	5–1	19 March 2017	
(Spain) Marcos	Southern	R&F	5–0	1 April 2017	
(Brazil) Giovane	Eastern	Pegasus	5–3	1 April 2017	
(Spain) Rufino	Kitchee	Biu Chun Glory Sky	5–1	2 April 2017	
(Spain) Rufino^{^{4}}	Kitchee	HKFC	10–0	7 April 2017	
Sandro^{^{4}}	Kitchee	HKFC	10–0	7 April 2017	
(Spain) Jordi	Rangers	Eastern	3–3	8 April 2017	
Sandro	Kitchee	Eastern	4–1	6 May 2017	
(Brazil) Lucas	Tai Po	Biu Chun Glory Sky	3–3	6 May 2017	

- ^{4} Player scored 4 goals

== Attendances ==
Pos	Team	Total	High	Low	Average	Change
1	Eastern	19,227	6,413	682	1,923	+0.8%
2	Kitchee	18,498	3,863	744	1,850	+16.1%
3	Yuen Long	13,951	2,019	592	1,395	+29.6%
4	South China	13,529	3,283	346	1,353	+18.9%
5	Tai Po	7,642	1,474	421	764	n/a^{1}
6	Pegasus	7,235	1,507	249	724	−26.2%
7	Southern	5,322	1,167	236	532	+8.8%
8	Rangers	5,190	1,171	215	519	+8.8%
9	Biu Chun Glory Sky	4,595	746	230	460	n/a^{1}
10	HKFC	3,867	669	292	387	n/a^{1}
11	R&F	2,066	361	100	207	n/a^{1}
	League total	101,122	6,413	100	919	−9.8%

Source: Soccerway
Notes:
1: Team did not play last season in the Premier League

== Hong Kong Top Footballer Awards ==
Awards	Prize Winner	Club	Votes
Footballer of the Year	(Brazil) Fernando	Kitchee	75.95%
Coach of the Year	(Hong Kong) Chu Chi Kwong	Kitchee	53.68%
Young Players of the Year	(Hong Kong) Tan Chun Lok	Tai Po	67.18%
Young Players of the Year	(Hong Kong) Wong Tsz Ho	Eastern	47.50%
Players' Player	(Brazil) Fernando	Kitchee	25
Most Favorite Player	(Brazil) Fernando	Kitchee	2,429
Hong Kong Top Footballers
Goalkeeper	(Hong Kong) Yapp Hung Fai	Eastern	41.13%
Defenders	(South Korea) Kim Bong-jin	Kitchee	67.18%
Defenders	(Hong Kong) Hélio	Kitchee	52.33%
Defenders	(Hong Kong) Beto Júnior	Eastern	37.86%
Defenders	(Hong Kong) Wong Tsz Ho	Eastern	36.13%
Midfielders	(Brazil) Fernando	Kitchee	75.95%
Midfielders	(Hong Kong) Huang Yang	Kitchee	49.79%
Midfielders	(Brazil) Diego Eli	Eastern	37.05%
Midfielders	(Hong Kong) Itaparica	Tai Po	30.76%
Forwards	(Hong Kong) Sandro	Kitchee	57.69%
Forwards	(Spain) Manuel Bleda	Eastern	40.58%
