= Barag =

Barag may refer to:

- Barag tribe, a tribe of Mongols
- Dan Barag (1935–2009), Israeli educator
- New Barag Left Banner, subdivision of Inner Mongolia, China
- New Barag Right Banner, subdivision of Inner Mongolia, China
- Old Barag Banner, subdivision of Inner Mongolia, China
- Barag, Iran (disambiguation), villages in South Khorasan Province, Iran

== See also ==
- Barg (disambiguation)
- Barak (disambiguation)
