= Birg =

Birg refers to:

- Birg (Bernese Alps), a mountain in Switzerland
- the Austrian EDV-Handler BIRG
- Basking in reflected glory, frequently abbreviated to BIRG or BIRGing
- Birg (Hillfort), hillfort in Baierbrunn

== See also ==
- Barg (disambiguation)
- Berg (disambiguation)
- Borg (disambiguation)
- Burg (disambiguation)
