= The Berg =

Proposed artificial mountain in Berlin

The Berg was a proposed landscaping project by German architect Jakob Tigges to build the world's largest artificial mountain at the location of the present Tempelhof airport in Berlin, Germany. Plans to construct a 1,000-metre-high (3,300 ft) mountain that could serve as a recreation area and wildlife refuge were not pursued due to budget and logistic considerations.
