= General Berg =

General Berg may refer to:

- Ingvar Berg (1905–1993), Swedish Air Force major general
- Johan Berg (1917–1981), Norwegian Army major general
- Martin Berg (1905–1969), German Wehrmacht major general
- Ole Berg (1890–1968), Norwegian Army lieutenant general
- Russell A. Berg (1917–2002), U.S. Air Force brigadier general

== See also ==
- Georges Bergé (1909–1997), French Army brigadier general
