= Berg report =

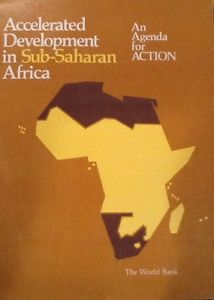
Cover of Accelerated Development in Sub-Saharan Africa, World Bank report published in 1981

The Berg report is the name most commonly used for the World Bank-published report "Accelerated Development in Sub-Saharan Africa: A Plan for Action," written by Elliot Berg in 1981. The report was written in response to a 1979 request from the African Governors of the World Bank for a paper analyzing the development problems facing African countries. It also responds to a set of policies determined by African Chiefs of State in 1980, called the Lagos Plan of Action. While the Lagos Plan endorsed inward-looking policies of African self-reliance, the Berg report advocated for outward-looking policies of increased international trade.

== Synopsis ==
The report is historically important for having marked a shift in African countries’ economic policies towards economic liberalization. It details several policy recommendations in its plan for action, including “(1) more suitable trade and exchange-rate policies; (2) increased efficiency of resource use in the public sector; and (3) improvement in agriculture policies.” In terms of trade and exchange-rate policies, the report recommends liberalizations including “correction of overvalued exchange rates […]; improved price incentives for exports and for agriculture; lower and more uniform protection for industry; and reduced use of direct controls.” For efficient resource usage, the Berg report identifies government and parastatal agencies as being overextended, and suggests streamlining public services, in part by allowing a greater share of these to be provided by the private sector. In the area of agriculture, they propose promoting export of cash crops by reducing taxes and other unfavorable terms of trade, as well as making domestic food markets more efficient by loosening regulation and increasing the role of the private sector in inputs (such as fertilizer) and in marketing foodstuffs (e.g. deregulating food prices). The report concludes with a strong appeal to international aid organizations to support African governments as they shift towards the policies of economic liberalization recommended by the World Bank.

== Reception ==
The recommendations contained in the World Bank's report held real significance for African political leaders, as the Bank is a major development lending agency with the power to affect the identification and design of development projects. Structural adjustment programs (SAPs) instituted by the World Bank made loans conditional on specific conditions, a strong inducement for countries to follow free-market policies. The report makes specific recommendations to donors, stating, “The level and pattern of donor assistance to a country must be determined in the framework of programs of action prepared by individual governments, which address the critical development policy issues outlined in this Report.” Explicitly advocating for “policy action and foreign assistance that are mutually reinforcing,” the report reinforces its own recommendations by leveraging loan and aid money. The Berg report generated criticism from some scholars of international development and African studies, particularly for the way it represents “the balance of responsibility for development failure.” The report prioritizes “domestic policy inadequacies” as a major cause for under-performing economies, and some have argued that the report downplays “the importance of external factors in shaping policy and performance in Sub-Saharan Africa.” In 1981, when the report was published, an important external factor was the instability of the global economy, particularly the stagflation of the 1970s, and the 1979 energy crisis.

== See also ==
- Lagos plan of action
- Washington consensus
- Trade liberalization
- Globalization
