= Berg (footballer, born 1964) =

Brazilian footballer

Personal information
- Full name: Rosemberg Barbosa
- Date of birth: 29 May 1964 (age 62)
- Place of birth: Londrina, Brazil
- Position: Centre-back

Senior career*
Years	Team	Apps	(Gls)
1986	Umuarama		
1987	União Bandeirante		
1988–1990	Coritiba		
1991	Taquaritinga		
1992	Apucarana		
1993	Inter de Lages		
1995	Toledo		
1996	Nacional-PR		
- * Club domestic league appearances and goals as of 31 October 2023

Rosemberg Barbosa (born 29 May 1964), better known as Berg, is a Brazilian former professional footballer who played as a centre-back.

== Career ==
A defender, Berg was part of the state champion squad in 1989. In 1990, on the other hand, he ended up scoring an own goal that gave Athletico Paranaense the state title that season.

== Honours ==
Coritiba

- Campeonato Paranaense: 1989
