= 2016–17 Hong Kong season play-off =

2016–17 Hong Kong Season play-off
Tournament details
- Country: Hong Kong
- Teams: 4

Final positions
- Champions: Eastern
- Runners-up: Southern

Tournament statistics
- Matches played: 3
- Goals scored: 14 (4.67 per match)
- Attendance: 5,525 (1,842 per match)

The 2016–17 season play-off for the 2016–17 Hong Kong football season was the 5th season of the tournament.

The play-off semi-finals are played were single elimination ties, contested by the teams who finished in 2nd and 3rd place in the Premier League table, the winners of the Senior Challenge Shield and the champions of the FA Cup. The winners of the semi-finals went through to the final, with the winner of the final gaining participation for the 2018 AFC Champions League qualifying play-off.

Eastern defeated Southern in the final to win the play-offs. This is the last edition of the play-offs, and in future seasons the AFC Champions League and/or AFC Cup play-off place will be decided by the FA Cup.

== Qualified ==
=== Premier League ===
Pos	Team	Pld	W	D	L	GF	GA	GD	Pts	Qualification or relegation
1	Kitchee (C)	20	16	3	1	54	8	+46	51	Qualification to Champions League group stage
2	Eastern	20	15	4	1	60	25	+35	49	Qualification to Champions League preliminary round 2 and season play-off
3	Southern	20	10	6	4	48	21	+27	36	Qualification to season play-off
4	South China (R)	20	11	2	7	34	26	+8	35	Qualification to season play-off and relegation to First Division (Note: South China did not apply for the next season's Hong Kong Premier League Licence.)
5	Yuen Long	20	9	4	7	36	23	+13	31	Qualification to season play-off
6	Tai Po	20	9	4	7	29	21	+8	31	
7	Rangers	20	7	5	8	31	33	−2	26	
8	Pegasus	20	7	5	8	35	35	0	26	
9	Biu Chun Glory Sky	20	2	4	14	24	55	−31	10	
10	(China) R&F	20	3	1	16	13	53	−40	10	
11	HKFC (R)	20	2	0	18	13	77	−64	6	Relegation to First Division

Updated to match(es) played on 6 May 2017. Source: Hong Kong Football Association
Rules for classification: 1) Points; 2) Head-to-head points; 3) Head-to-head goal difference; 4) Head-to-head goals scored; 5) Goal difference; 6) Goals scored; 7) Fair-play points; 8) Drawing lots (Play-off if the winner has to be decided)
(C) Champions; (R) Relegated

=== Senior Challenge Shield ===
The winners of the Senior Challenge Shield will guarantee a place in the play-off.

Winners:

- Kitchee

=== FA Cup ===
The winners of the FA Cup will guarantee a place in the play-off.

Winners:

- Kitchee

== Bracket ==
Semi-finals
South China	1
Eastern	6
Yuen Long	1
Southern	3

Final
Eastern	3
Southern	0

== Fixtures and results ==
=== Semi-finals ===
20 May 2017	South China	1–6	Eastern	Mong Kok Stadium, Kowloon
15:00 UTC+8	Kato 70'	Report	Lugo 6'; Diego 30', 54'; McKee 38'; Mitchell 45+3'; Cheng Siu Wai 89'	Attendance: 2,106; Referee: Tong Kui Sum

21 May 2017	Yuen Long	1–3	Southern	Mong Kok Stadium, Kowloon
15:00 UTC+8	Pereira 56' (pen.)	Report	Ngue 37'; Jiménez 65' (pen.); Wellingsson 75'	Attendance: 1,226; Referee: Liu Kwok Man

=== Final ===
27 May 2017	Eastern	3–0	Southern	Mong Kok Stadium, Kowloon
15:00 UTC+8	Giovane 52'; Lugo 64'; McKee 79'	Report		Attendance: 2,193; Referee: Tong Kui Sum
