= Berg (footballer, born 1978) =

Brazilian footballer

Personal information
- Full name: Lindberg Mota da Silva
- Date of birth: 13 October 1978 (age 48)
- Place of birth: São Paulo, Brazil
- Position: Forward

Senior career*
Years	Team	Apps	(Gls)
2000–2001	Bangu		
2001	Ferroviária		
2002	Matonense		
2002	Ferroviária		
2003–2005	Matonense		
2006	Sertãozinho		
2006	XV de Piracicaba		
2006	Matonense		
2007–2008	Taquaritinga		
2008	Comercial-SP		
2009	Sertãozinho		
2009	Nacional-SP		
2010	Red Bull Brasil		
2010	São José-SP		
2011	Brasil de Farroupilha		
2011	Atlético Tubarão		
2012	Brasil de Pelotas		
2013	Farroupilha		
- * Club domestic league appearances and goals as of 31 October 2023

Lindberg Mota da Silva (born 13 October 1978), better known as Berg, is a Brazilian former professional footballer who played as a forward.

== Career ==
A speed striker, Berg became famous after a match against EC Noroeste, where he tried to imitate the "pedals" that Robinho had done in the 2002 Campeonato Brasileiro Série A final.

== Honours ==
Red Bull Brasil

- Campeonato Paulista Série A3: 2010
