= Barg, Iran =

Barg برگ
- Village
- Location within Iran
- Coordinates: 36°33′10″N 59°29′30″E
- Country: Iran
- Province: Razavi Khorasan
- County: Mashhad
- Bakhsh: Central
- Rural District: Darzab

Population (2006)
  - Total: 194
- Time zone: UTC+3:30 (IRST)
  - Summer (DST): UTC+4:30 (IRDT)

Barg (Persian: برگ) is a village in Darzab Rural District, in the Central District of Mashhad County, Razavi Khorasan Province, Iran. At the 2006 census, its population was 194, in 44 families.

== See also ==
- List of cities, towns and villages in Razavi Khorasan Province
