= Berg im Donaugau Abbey =

Coordinates: 48.635°N 11.23983°E

Berg im Donaugau Abbey (German: Kloster Berg im Donaugau) was a Benedictine monastery located somewhere in the area of Berg im Gau in Bavaria, Germany.

== History ==
Berg im Donaugau Abbey was founded by Wolchanhard, son of the nobleman Isanhart (who gave him, possibly as a child oblate, to St Peter's Abbey, Salzburg, around 768, as a private monastery for his family. He was also the first abbot. It was dedicated to the Holy Saviour (Sankt Salvator). He attended the synod of Dingolfing in 770.

After the fall of Duke Tassilo III of Bavaria and the end of the Agilolfinger dynasty in 788, Wolchanhardt put the monastery under the protection of Charlemagne. This made it subject to the crown rather than the diocesan bishop. In 815 Louis the Pious confirmed this immunity to Abbot Sigihard.

A deed of 18 May 875 records the gift of the monastery by King Louis the German to the Alte Kapelle ("Old Chapel") in Regensburg, which he himself had built. After the invasion of the Hungarians in the 10th century there is no further record of its existence, and even its exact site is now unknown.
