= Berg en Terblijt =

Coordinates: 50.86112°N 5.78447°E

- Former municipality
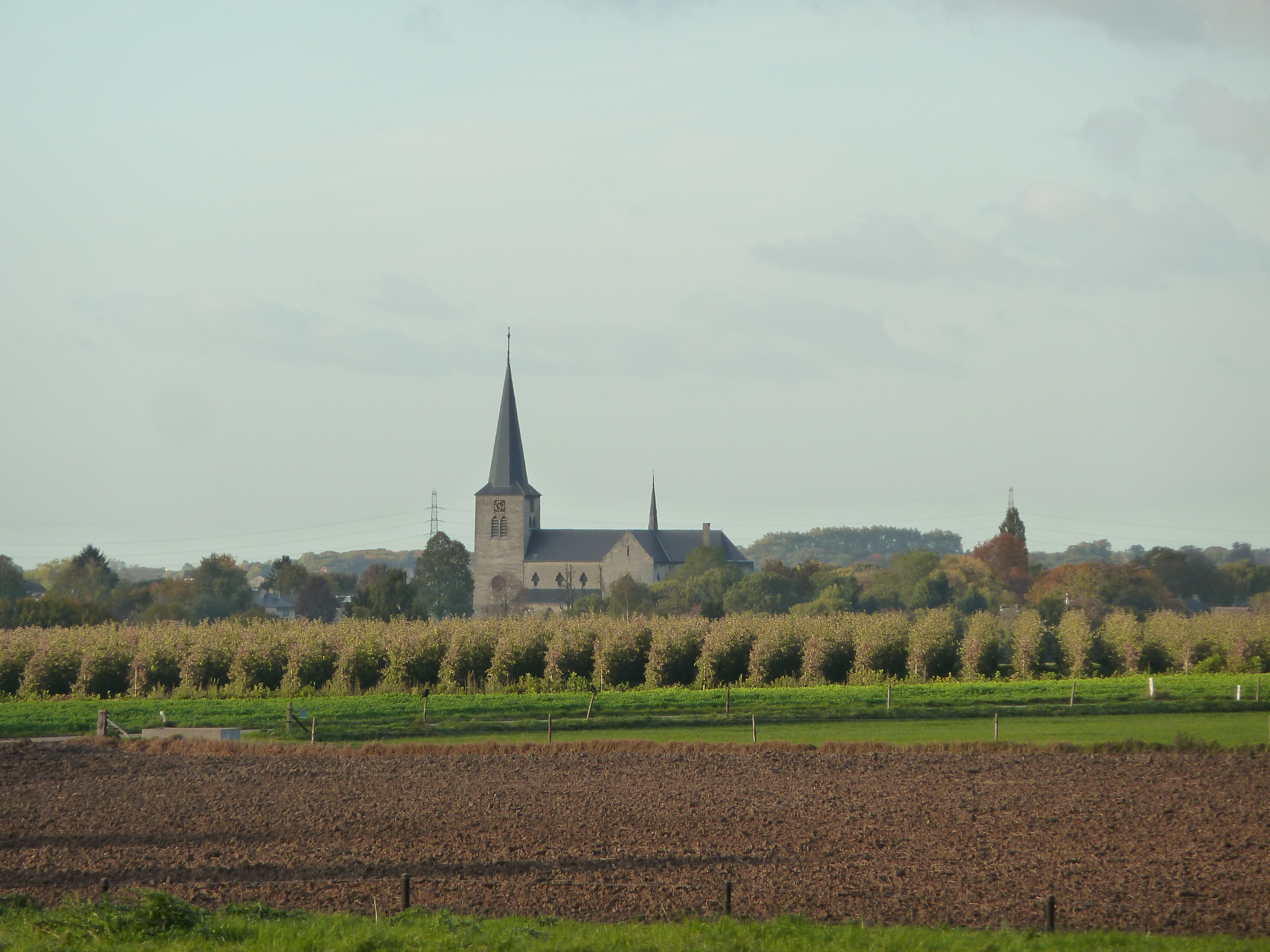
- View on Berg with the Saint-Monulphus and Gondulphuschurch (Berg)

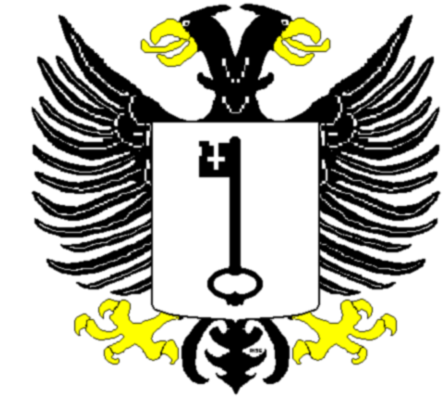
- Coat of arms

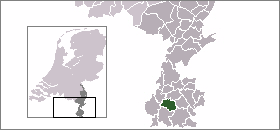
- Country: Netherlands
- Province: Limburg
- Municipality: Valkenburg aan de Geul
- Merged into Valkenburg aan de Geul: 1982
- Hoofdplaats: Berg
- Postal code: 6325

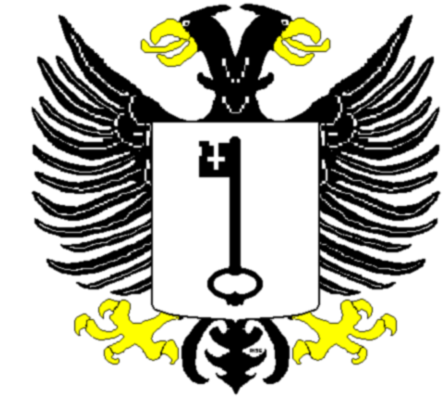
The coat of arms of Berg en Terblijt, showing a shield with a black key and a two-headed eagle in black and gold.

Berg en Terblijt (Dutch pronunciation: [ˈbɛr(ə)x ɛn tɛrˈblɛit]; Limburgish: Berg [ˈbæʀ(ə)x] or Berg en Terbliet [ˈbæʀ(ə)ɣ æn tæʀˈbliːt]) is the official Dutch name of a village in the municipality of Valkenburg aan de Geul in the province of Limburg in the Southern part of the Netherlands.

== History ==
The area now known as Berg en Terblijt has been inhabited since the Early Middle Ages. Between the 500 and 800 A.D., a couple of farming communities have been established at the Langen Akker, on the eastern side of the village, and around the Schone Poel, which is on the western side of the village. The Schone Poel has been argued to be a traditional small Frankish, being designed in a triangular form with farms around a central drinking pool. Until the late 1500s there had been a tradition of winemaking in the area of Berg en Terblijt. Even during the Eighty Years' War a couple of vineyards were producing wines from local varieties of vines, a tradition that has returned with the recent climate change that have made it possible once more to produce quality wines so far north.

Berg en Terblijt was a combination of Berg (4000 inhabitants) and Terblijt (100 inhabitants). Berg derived its name from its location, on top of a hill, overlooking Maastricht. The area of Berg en Terblijt is wooded and crossed by the Geul river.

In 1982 the area was merged with Valkenburg-Houthem, forming the new municipality of Valkenburg aan de Geul.

== People: economy, leisure ==
As Berg is situated along the edge of the Plateau of Margraten, a very fertile loess plain about 160 meters above NAP it has been an agricultural community for most of its history. Only in the last decades has the production of foodstuffs like grains and fruits lost most of its former importance. Nowadays, most villagers commute to work in nearby towns like Valkenburg and Maastricht. Being close to tourist hotspots Valkenburg and Maastricht, the village offers some bed and breakfast and hotel accommodation, as well as a camping site.

Since the early 1990s the village has had an own radio-station, Falcon Radio. In recent years the local television-station of TV Valkenburg has been broadcasting on cable in the municipality of Valkenburg aan de Geul, including Berg en Terblijt

Berg en Terblijt has a very active community life with various sports clubs (football, handball, tennis, badminton, judo billiards), a concert band, a mixed choir, a young adults club (Jonkheid), and a carnival club.
