= Berg, Åtvidaberg =

Berg
- Location within Östergötland Location within Sweden
- Coordinates: 58°13′N 16°02′E
- Country: Sweden
- Province: Östergötland
- County: Östergötland County
- Municipality: Åtvidaberg Municipality

Area
  - Total: 0.54 km^{2} (0.21 sq mi)

Population (31 December 2010)
  - Total: 311
  - Density: 581/km^{2} (1,500/sq mi)
- Time zone: UTC+1 (CET)
  - Summer (DST): UTC+2 (CEST)

Berg is a locality situated in Åtvidaberg Municipality, Östergötland County, Sweden with 311 inhabitants in 2010.
