= Berg (footballer, born 1989) =

Brazilian footballer (born 1989)

Personal information
- Full name: Waldenberg Messias Coelho
- Date of birth: 27 January 1989 (age 37)
- Place of birth: Maceió, Alagoas, Brazil
- Height: 1.78 m (5 ft 10 in)
- Position: Attacking midfielder

Youth career
- 2005: Vitória
- 2006–2007: São José–PA

Senior career*
Years	Team	Apps	(Gls)
2007–2008	São José–PA		
2009	Grêmio		
2010	Central		
2010	Juventus–SP		
2010	Atlético–PB		
2011	Águia de Marabá	2	(1)
2011	Joaçaba		
2012	União São João	9	(0)
2013	Cerâmica	0	(0)
2014	União Barbarense	8	(1)
2015	Murici	5	(0)
2016	Rio Branco–ES		
2017	Hong Kong Rangers	1	(0)
- * Club domestic league appearances and goals as of 9 August 2017

Waldenberg Messias Coelho (born 27 January 1989), commonly known as Berg, is a Brazilian professional footballer who is currently a free agent and lives in the US.

He is a versatile attacker and can play as an attacking midfielder.
