= Berg, Valkenburg =

Berg
- Village
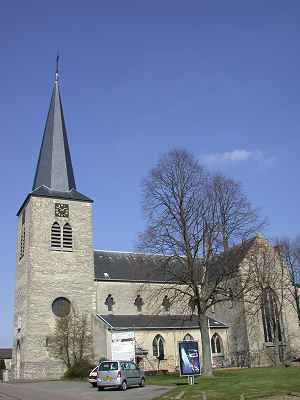
- The St. Monulphus Church in Berg

- Location in the Netherlands Location in the province of Limburg in the Netherlands
- Coordinates: 50°51′42″N 5°47′0″E
- Country: Netherlands
- Province: Limburg
- Municipality: Valkenburg aan de Geul

Area
  - Total: 1.43 km^{2} (0.55 sq mi)
- Elevation: 123 m (404 ft)

Population (2021)
  - Total: 3,095
  - Density: 2,160/km^{2} (5,610/sq mi)
- Time zone: UTC+1 (CET)
  - Summer (DST): UTC+2 (CEST)
- Postal code: 6325
- Dialing code: 043

Berg (Dutch pronunciation: [ˈbɛr(ə)x]; Limburgish: [ˈbæʀ(ə)x]) is a village in the Dutch province of Limburg. It is a part of the municipality of Valkenburg aan de Geul, and lies about 7 km east of Maastricht.

The village was first mentioned in 1139 as Berga, and means hill. Berg is located on the plateau of Margraten and used to be long to the Chapter of Saint Servatius.

The St Monulphus and Gondulphus Church is a three-aisled church made out of chalk stone. It was built between 1931 and 1933.

Berg was home to 314 people in 1840. Until 1982, Berg and the neighbouring hamlet of Terblijt constituted the municipality of Berg en Terblijt, which also covered the small hamlets of Geulhem and Vilt.

== Gallery ==
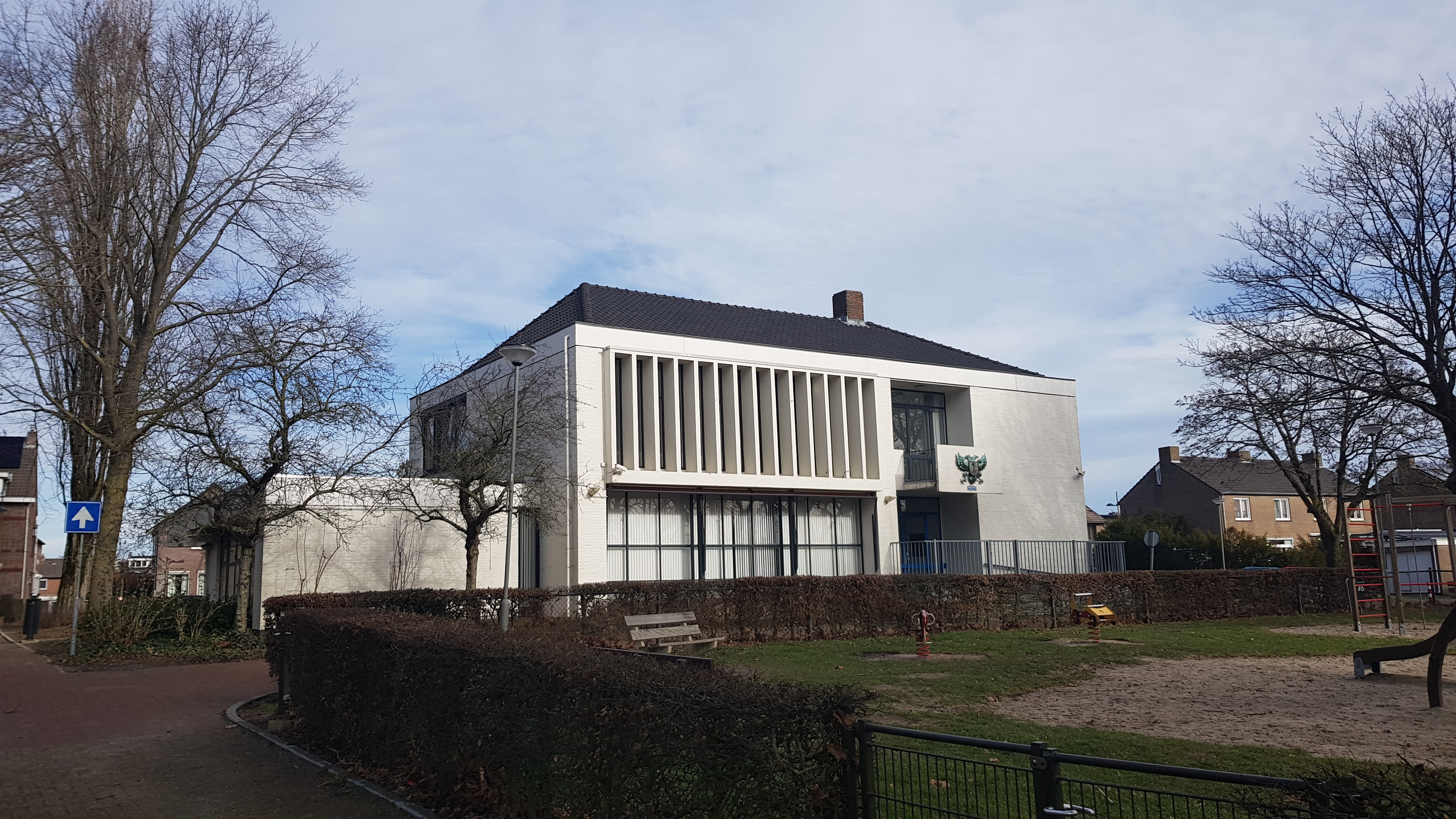
Building in Berg

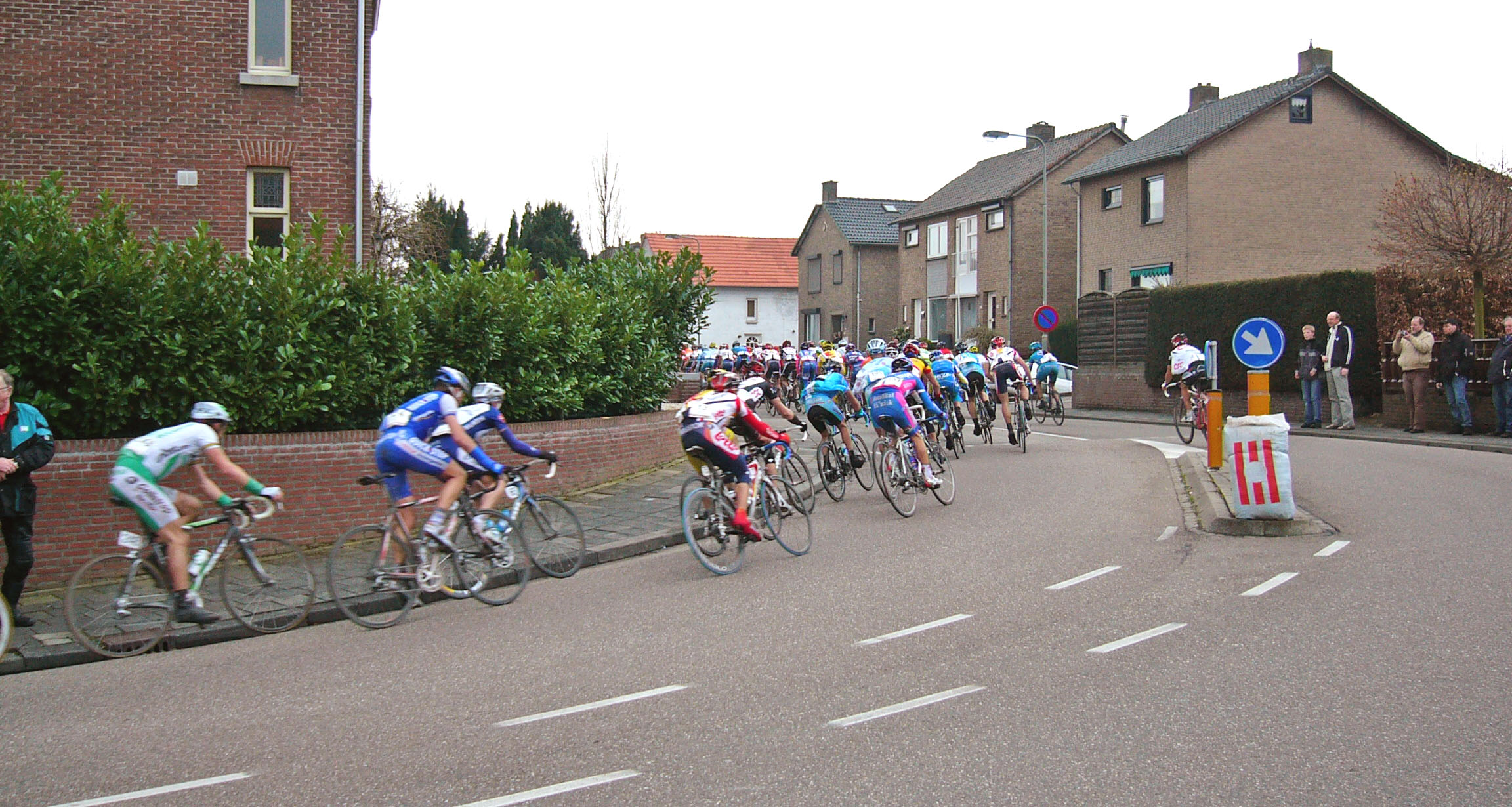
Amstel Gold Race in Berg

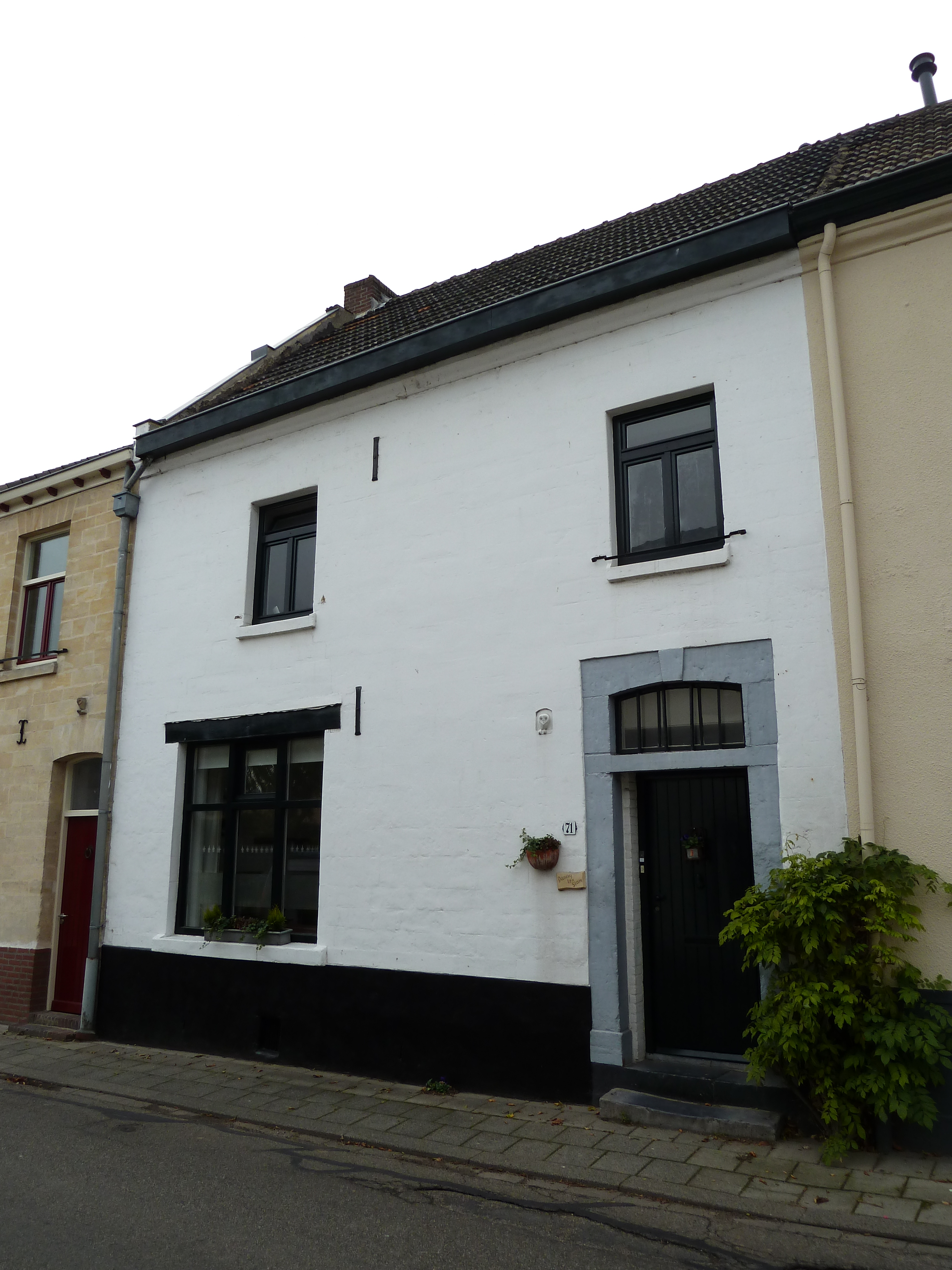
House in Berg

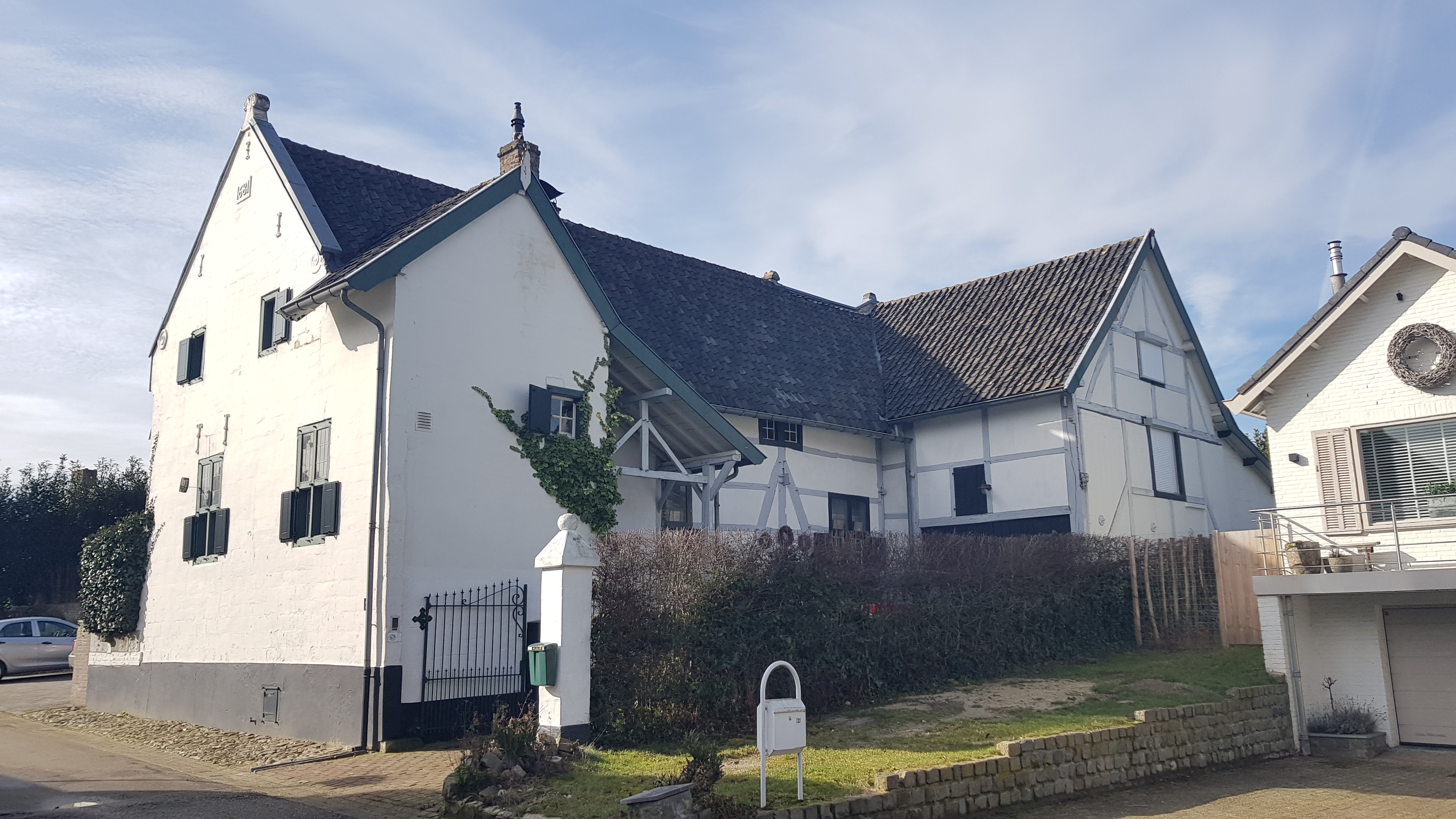
Farm in Berg
